= 2009–10 C.F. Monterrey season =

Monterrey
2009–10 season
- Manager: Víctor Manuel Vucetich
- Stadium: Estadio Tecnológico
- Apertura: 5th Playoffs: Winners
- Bicentenario: 1st Playoffs: Quarterfinals
- Copa Libertadores: Group stage
- Top goalscorer: Aldo de Nigris (14 goals)
- Biggest win: Monterrey 4–0 Ciudad Juárez (16 January 2010)
- Biggest defeat: Atlas 3–0 Monterrey (23 January 2010)
| Home colours | Away colours |
- All statistics correct as of 28 July 2019.

The 2009–10 C.F. Monterrey season was the 75th season in the football club's history and the 60th consecutive season in the top flight of Mexican football. The club participated in the Apertura and Bicentenario tournaments of the Mexican Primera División as well as in the Copa Libertadores.

Monterrey won the Apertura 2010 tournament.

== Coaching staff ==
| Position | Name |
|---|---|
| Head coach | (Mexico) Víctor Manuel Vucetich |
| Assistant coach | (Mexico) Carlos Barra |
| Fitness coach | (Mexico) Miguel Ramírez |
| Kinesiologist | (Mexico) Francisco García |
| Masseur | (Mexico) José Obregón |
| Doctor | (Mexico) Raúl Luna |

== Players ==
=== Squad information ===
| No. | Pos. | Nat. | Name | Date of birth (age) | Signed in | Previous club |
Goalkeepers
| 1 | GK | (Mexico) | Jonathan Orozco | 12 May 1986 (aged 23) | 2005 | (Mexico) Youth system |
| 30 | GK | (Mexico) | Daniel Aguirre | 28 December 1987 (aged 22) | 2008 | (Mexico) Querétaro |
Defenders
| 2 | DF | (Mexico) | Severo Meza | 9 July 1986 (aged 23) | 2005 | (Mexico) Youth system |
| 3 | DF | (Mexico) | Eduardo Guevara | 17 September 1989 (aged 20) | 2010 (Winter) | (Mexico) Youth system |
| 4 | DF | (Mexico) | Diego Cervantes | 30 August 1984 (aged 25) | 2005 | (Mexico) Atlante |
| 5 | DF | (Mexico) | Duilio Davino | 21 March 1976 (aged 33) | 2009 | (Mexico) Puebla |
| 15 | DF | (Argentina) | José María Basanta (VC) | 3 April 1984 (aged 25) | 2008 | (Argentina) Estudiantes |
| 16 | DF | (Mexico) | Luis Rodríguez | 21 January 1991 (aged 18) | 2010 (Winter) | (Mexico) Youth system |
| 19 | DF | (Mexico) | Héctor Morales | 3 May 1985 (aged 24) | 2004 | (Mexico) Youth system |
| 21 | DF | (Mexico) | Sergio Pérez | 13 October 1986 (aged 23) | 2010 (Winter) | (Mexico) Puebla |
| 22 | DF | (Mexico) | William Paredes | 9 September 1985 (aged 24) | 2006 | (Mexico) Youth system |
| 24 | DF | (Mexico) | Óscar Recio | 23 June 1989 (aged 20) | 2008 | (Mexico) Youth system |
Midfielders
| 6 | MF | (Mexico) | Gerardo Galindo | 23 May 1978 (aged 31) | 2008 | (Mexico) Necaxa |
| 7 | MF | (Mexico) | Juan Carlos Medina | 22 August 1983 (aged 26) | 2009 | (Mexico) América |
| 8 | MF | (Mexico) | Luis Pérez (Captain) | 21 January 1981 (aged 28) | 2003 | (Mexico) Necaxa |
| 10 | MF | (Paraguay) | Osvaldo Martínez | 8 April 1986 (aged 23) | 2008 | (Paraguay) Libertad |
| 18 | MF | (Argentina) | Neri Cardozo | 8 August 1986 (aged 23) | 2010 (Winter) | (Mexico) Chiapas |
| 20 | MF | (Ecuador) | Walter Ayoví | 11 August 1978 (aged 31) | 2009 (Winter) | (Ecuador) El Nacional |
| 28 | MF | (Mexico) | Jesús Arellano | 8 May 1973 (aged 36) | 2000 | (Mexico) Guadalajara |
Forwards
| 9 | FW | (Mexico) | Sergio Santana | 10 August 1979 (aged 30) | 2009 | (Mexico) Toluca |
| 11 | FW | (Mexico) | Aldo de Nigris | 22 July 1983 (aged 26) | 2009 | (Mexico) Necaxa |
| 13 | FW | (Mexico) | Darío Carreño | 13 January 1988 (aged 22) | 2008 | (Mexico) Youth system |
| 14 | FW | (Mexico) | Brayan Martínez | 22 January 1990 (aged 19) | 2010 (Winter) | (Mexico) Youth system |
| 17 | FW | (Mexico) | Jesús Zavala | 21 July 1987 (aged 22) | 2006 | (Mexico) Youth system |
| 23 | FW | (Brazil) | Val Baiano | 7 April 1981 (aged 28) | 2010 (Winter) | (Brazil) Grêmio Barueri |

== Transfers ==
=== In ===
| N | Pos. | Nat. | Name | Age | Moving from | Type | Transfer window | Source |
|---|---|---|---|---|---|---|---|---|
| 23 | FW | (Brazil) | Val Baiano | 7 April 1981 (aged 28) | (Brazil) Grêmio Barueri | Transfer | Winter | |

=== Out ===
| N | Pos. | Nat. | Name | Age | Moving to | Type | Transfer window | Source |
|---|---|---|---|---|---|---|---|---|
| 14 | DF | (Mexico) | Elliott Huitrón | 7 April 1983 (aged 26) | Ciudad Juárez | Loan | Winter | |
| 21 | DF | (Mexico) | Diego Ordaz | 7 May 1984 (aged 25) | Chiapas | Loan | Winter | |
| 23 | DF | (Panama) | Felipe Baloy | 24 February 1981 (aged 28) | Santos Laguna | Transfer | Winter | |
| 26 | FW | (Chile) | Humberto Suazo | 10 May 1981 (aged 28) | (Spain) Real Zaragoza | Loan | Winter | |

== Competitions ==
=== Overview ===
| Competition | First match | Last match | Starting round | Final position | Record | | | | | | | |
| Competition | First match | Last match | Starting round | Final position | Pld | W | D | L | GF | GA | GD | Win % |
|---|---|---|---|---|---|---|---|---|---|---|---|---|
| Torneo Apertura | 26 July 2009 | 6 December 2009 | Matchday 1 | Winners | 23 | 13 | 5 | 5 | 38 | 22 | +16 | 56.52 |
| Torneo Bicentenario | 16 January 2010 | 23 May 2010 | Matchday 1 | 1st (Semifinals) | 19 | 10 | 6 | 3 | 31 | 18 | +13 | 52.63 |
| Copa Libertadores | 10 February 2010 | 21 April 2010 | Group stage | Group stage | 6 | 1 | 3 | 2 | 5 | 8 | −3 | 16.67 |
| Total | | | | | 48 | 24 | 14 | 10 | 74 | 48 | +26 | 50.00 |

Source: Mediotiempo.com

=== Torneo Apertura ===
==== League table ====
| Pos | Team | Pld | W | D | L | GF | GA | GD | Pts | Qualification or relegation |
|---|---|---|---|---|---|---|---|---|---|---|
| 3 | Morelia | 17 | 10 | 3 | 4 | 31 | 15 | +16 | 33 | Advance to Liguilla |
| 4 | América | 17 | 8 | 6 | 3 | 29 | 16 | +13 | 30 | Advance to Liguilla |
| 5 | Monterrey (C) | 17 | 9 | 3 | 5 | 27 | 16 | +11 | 30 | Advance to Liguilla |
| 6 | Santos Laguna | 17 | 7 | 6 | 4 | 29 | 24 | +5 | 27 | Advance to Liguilla |
| 7 | Puebla | 17 | 6 | 8 | 3 | 19 | 19 | 0 | 26 | Advance to Liguilla |

Source: Liga MX
Rules for classification: 1) Points; 2) Goal difference; 3) Number of goals scored; 4) Head-to-head results between tied teams; 5) Number of goals scored away; 6) Highest relegation coefficient; 7) Fair Play points
(C) Champions

==== Results summary ====
| Overall | | | | | | | | Home | | | | | | Away | | | | | |
| Pld | W | D | L | GF | GA | GD | Pts | W | D | L | GF | GA | GD | W | D | L | GF | GA | GD |
|---|---|---|---|---|---|---|---|---|---|---|---|---|---|---|---|---|---|---|---|
| 17 | 9 | 3 | 5 | 27 | 16 | +11 | 30 | 5 | 2 | 1 | 15 | 7 | +8 | 4 | 1 | 4 | 12 | 9 | +3 |

Source: LigaMX

==== Result round by round ====
| Round | 1 | 2 | 3 | 4 | 5 | 6 | 7 | 8 | 9 | 10 | 11 | 12 | 13 | 14 | 15 | 16 | 17 |
|---|---|---|---|---|---|---|---|---|---|---|---|---|---|---|---|---|---|
| Ground | A | H | A | H | A | H | A | H | A | H | A | H | A | A | H | A | H |
| Result | D | W | L | W | W | D | W | W | W | W | L | L | L | W | W | L | D |
| Position | | | | | | | | | | | | | | | | | 5 |

Source: LigaMX
A = Away; H = Home; W = Win; D = Draw; L = Loss

==== Matches ====
| 25 July 2009 1 | Ciudad Juárez | 0–0 | Monterrey | Ciudad Juárez |
| 19:00 | | Report | | Stadium: Estadio Olímpico Benito Juárez; Referee: Miguel Ángel Flores |

| 1 August 2009 2 | Monterrey | 3–0 | Atlas | Monterrey |
| 17:00 | Carreño 28'; Santana 38'; Suazo 85' | Report | | Stadium: Estadio Tecnológico; Referee: Rafael Medina |

| 8 August 2009 3 | Cruz Azul | 2–0 | Monterrey | Mexico City |
| 17:00 | Villa 34', 62' | Report | | Stadium: Estadio Azul; Referee: Mauricio Morales |

| 15 August 2009 4 | Monterrey | 1–0 | Toluca | Monterrey |
| 17:00 | Suazo 69' | Report | | Stadium: Estadio Tecnológico; Referee: Miguel Ángel Ayala |

| 22 August 2009 5 | UANL | 1–2 | Monterrey | San Nicolás de los Garza |
| 19:00 | Fernández 26' | Report | Meza 40'; de Nigris 66' | Stadium: Estadio Universitario; Referee: José Alfredo Peñaloza |

| 29 August 2009 6 | Monterrey | 2–2 | Estudiantes Tecos | Monterrey |
| 17:00 | Martínez 11'; de Nigris 82' | Report | Alcántar 45'; Zamogilny 58' | Stadium: Estadio Tecnológico; Referee: Jaime Herrera |

| 5 September 2009 7 | Querétaro | 1–3 | Monterrey | Querétaro City |
| 17:00 | Cháves 31' | Report | Pérez 25'; Carreño 70'; de Nigris 77' | Stadium: Estadio Corregidora; Referee: Julio David Escobar |

| 12 September 2009 8 | Monterrey | 3–0 | Atlante | Monterrey |
| 17:00 | Martínez 48'; Carreño 82'; de Nigris 86' | Report | | Stadium: Estadio Tecnológico; Referee: Paul Enrique Delgadillo |

| 19 September 2009 9 | Pachuca | 1–3 | Monterrey | Pachuca |
| 19:00 | Cacho 50' | Report | Suazo 55', 63'; Martínez 85' | Stadium: Estadio Hidalgo; Referee: Juan Genaro Medrano |

| 26 September 2009 10 | Monterrey | 2–1 | Puebla | Monterrey |
| 17:00 | Pérez 27'; Juárez 58' (o.g.) | Report | Olivera 74' | Stadium: Estadio Tecnológico; Referee: Ricardo Arellano |

| 3 October 2009 11 | Guadalajara | 1–0 | Monterrey | Guadalajara |
| 19:00 | Hernández 70' | Report | | Stadium: Estadio Jalisco; Referee: Erim Ramírez |

| 17 October 2009 12 | Monterrey | 1–2 | Chiapas | Monterrey |
| 17:00 | Pérez 8' | Report | Argüello 37'; Ordaz 59' (o.g.) | Stadium: Estadio Tecnológico; Referee: Jorge Eduardo Gasso |

| 25 October 2009 13 | UNAM | 2–1 | Monterrey | Mexico City |
| 12:00 | Barrera 82'; Íñiguez 85' | Report | Suazo 71' | Stadium: Estadio Olímpico Universitario; Referee: Jaime Herrera |

| 31 October 2009 14 | San Luis | 0–3 | Monterrey | San Luis Potosí City |
| 17:00 | | Report | de Nigris 49'; Suazo 52', 90+2' | Stadium: Estadio Alfonso Lastras; Referee: Rafael Medina |

| 4 November 2009 15 | Monterrey | 2–1 | Santos Laguna | Monterrey |
| 20:30 | Martínez 46'; de Nigris 49' | Report | Baloy 29' (o.g.) | Stadium: Estadio Tecnológico; Referee: Juan Genaro Medrano |

| 8 November 2009 16 | América | 1–0 | Monterrey | Mexico City |
| 16:30 | Montenegro 16' | Report | | Stadium: Estadio Azteca; Referee: Germán Arredondo |

| 14 November 2009 17 | Monterrey | 1–1 | Morelia | Monterrey |
| 17:00 | de Nigris 9' | Report | Hernández 34' | Stadium: Estadio Tecnológico; Referee: Mauricio Morales |

===== Liguilla =====
====== Quarterfinals ======
| 21 November 2009 First leg | Monterrey | 1–0 | América | Monterrey |
| 17:00 | de Nigris 47' | Report | | Stadium: Estadio Tecnológico; Referee: Ricardo Arellano |

| 28 November 2009 Second leg | América | 1–1 (1–2 agg.) | Monterrey | Mexico City |
| 21:00 | Cabañas 42' | Report | Suazo 79' | Stadium: Estadio Azteca; Referee: Marco Antonio Rodríguez |

====== Semifinals ======
| 3 December 2009 First leg | Monterrey | 2–0 | Toluca | Monterrey |
| 21:00 | de Nigris 45', 66' | Report | | Stadium: Estadio Tecnológico; Referee: José Alfredo Peñaloza |

| 6 December 2009 Second leg | Toluca | 1–1 (1–3 agg.) | Monterrey | Toluca |
| 12:00 | Brizuela 79' | Report | Carreño 71' | Stadium: Estadio Nemesio Díez; Referee: Jorge Eduardo Gasso |

====== Final ======
| 10 December 2009 First leg | Monterrey | 4–3 | Cruz Azul | Monterrey |
| 21:00 | Villa 3' (o.g.); Suazo 47', 88'; Santana 70' | Report | Riveros 6', 17'; Villa 34' | Stadium: Estadio Tecnológico; Referee: Jorge Eduardo Gasso |

| 13 December 2009 Second leg | Cruz Azul | 1–2 (4–6 agg.) | Monterrey | Mexico City |
| 18:00 | Castro 77' | Report | de Nigris 54'; Suazo 90' | Stadium: Estadio Azul; Referee: Marco Antonio Rodríguez |

=== Torneo Bicentenario ===
==== League table ====
| Pos | Team | Pld | W | D | L | GF | GA | GD | Pts | Qualification or relegation |
|---|---|---|---|---|---|---|---|---|---|---|
| 1 | Monterrey | 17 | 10 | 6 | 1 | 30 | 15 | +15 | 36 | Advance to Liguilla |
| 2 | Guadalajara | 17 | 10 | 2 | 5 | 28 | 21 | +7 | 32 | Advance to Liguilla |
| 3 | Toluca (C) | 17 | 8 | 6 | 3 | 27 | 15 | +12 | 30 | Advance to Liguilla |
| 4 | Pumas | 17 | 7 | 7 | 3 | 20 | 10 | +10 | 28 | Advance to Liguilla |
| 5 | Santos Laguna | 17 | 8 | 4 | 5 | 27 | 25 | +2 | 28 | Advance to Liguilla |

Source: Liga MX
Rules for classification: 1) Points; 2) Goal difference; 3) Number of goals scored; 4) Head-to-head results between tied teams; 5) Number of goals scored away; 6) Highest relegation coefficient; 7) Fair Play points
(C) Champions

==== Results summary ====
| Overall | | | | | | | | Home | | | | | | Away | | | | | |
| Pld | W | D | L | GF | GA | GD | Pts | W | D | L | GF | GA | GD | W | D | L | GF | GA | GD |
|---|---|---|---|---|---|---|---|---|---|---|---|---|---|---|---|---|---|---|---|
| 17 | 10 | 6 | 1 | 30 | 15 | +15 | 36 | 8 | 1 | 0 | 20 | 4 | +16 | 2 | 5 | 1 | 10 | 11 | −1 |

Source: LigaMX

==== Result round by round ====
| Round | 1 | 2 | 3 | 4 | 5 | 6 | 7 | 8 | 9 | 10 | 11 | 12 | 13 | 14 | 15 | 16 | 17 |
|---|---|---|---|---|---|---|---|---|---|---|---|---|---|---|---|---|---|
| Ground | H | A | H | A | H | A | H | A | H | A | H | A | H | H | A | H | A |
| Result | W | L | W | D | W | W | W | W | W | D | W | D | W | D | D | W | D |
| Position | | | | | | | | | | | | | | | | | 1 |

Source: LigaMX
A = Away; H = Home; W = Win; D = Draw; L = Loss

==== Matches ====
| 16 January 2010 1 | Monterrey | 4–0 | Ciudad Juárez | Monterrey |
| 17:00 | Morales 19'; de Nigris 37'; Carreño 76'; Medina 86' | Report | | Stadium: Estadio Tecnológico; Referee: Ricardo Arellano |

| 23 January 2010 2 | Atlas | 3–0 | Monterrey | Guadalajara |
| 21:00 | Zepeda 18', 47', 63' | Report | | Stadium: Estadio Jalisco; Referee: Miguel Ángel Chacón |

| 30 January 2010 3 | Monterrey | 2–0 | Cruz Azul | Monterrey |
| 17:00 | Cardozo 60'; Carreño 72' | Report | | Stadium: Estadio Tecnológico; Referee: Armando Archundia |

| 7 February 2010 4 | Toluca | 1–1 | Monterrey | Toluca |
| 12:00 | Sinha 27' | Report | Pérez 67' | Stadium: Estadio Nemesio Díez; Referee: José Alfredo Peñaloza |

| 14 February 2010 5 | Monterrey | 2–1 | UANL | Monterrey |
| 18:30 | de Nigris 23'; Cardozo 39' | Report | Molina 46' | Stadium: Estadio Tecnológico; Referee: Roberto García Orozco |

| 17 February 2010 6 | Estudiantes Tecos | 3–4 | Monterrey | Zapopan |
| 20:00 | Cejas 33'; Ruiz 51'; Gutiérrez 80' | Report | Jiménez 25' (o.g.); Carreño 56', 63'; de Nigris 69' | Stadium: Estadio Tres de Marzo; Referee: Hugo León Guajardo |

| 20 February 2010 7 | Monterrey | 3–0 | Querétaro | Monterrey |
| 17:00 | Cardozo 81'; Carreño 90+2'; Arellano 90+4' | Report | | Stadium: Estadio Tecnológico; Referee: Mauricio Morales |

| 27 February 2010 8 | Atlante | 0–1 | Monterrey | Cancún |
| 19:00 | | Report | Martínez 52' | Stadium: Estadio Andrés Quintana Roo; Referee: Miguel Ángel Flores |

| 6 March 2010 9 | Monterrey | 3–0 | Pachuca | Monterrey |
| 17:00 | Morales 18'; Ayoví 85'; Val Baiano 90+3' | Report | | Stadium: Estadio Tecnológico; Referee: Roberto García Orozco |

| 14 March 2010 10 | Puebla | 1–1 | Monterrey | Puebla |
| 16:00 | Gómez 65' | Report | Rincón 47' (o.g.) | Stadium: Estadio Cuauhtémoc; Referee: Jaime Herrera |

| 20 March 2010 11 | Monterrey | 2–1 | Guadalajara | Monterrey |
| 17:00 | Martínez 48'; Zavala 63' | Report | Hernández 65' | Stadium: Estadio Tecnológico; Referee: José Alfredo Peñaloza |

| 27 March 2010 12 | Chiapas | 1–1 | Monterrey | Tuxtla Gutiérrez |
| 17:00 | J. Martínez 49' | Report | O. Martínez 68' | Stadium: Estadio Víctor Manuel Reyna; Referee: Juan Genaro Medrano |

| 3 April 2010 13 | Monterrey | 1–0 | UNAM | Monterrey |
| 17:00 | Ayoví 63' | Report | | Stadium: Estadio Tecnológico; Referee: Armando Archundia |

| 10 April 2010 14 | Monterrey | 1–1 | San Luis | Monterrey |
| 17:00 | Carreño 66' | Report | Pérez 79' | Stadium: Estadio Tecnológico; Referee: Germán Arredondo |

| 14 April 2010 15 | Santos Laguna | 1–1 | Monterrey | Torreón |
| 21:00 | Peralta 53' | Report | Arellano 84' | Stadium: Estadio Corona; Referee: Mauricio Morales |

| 17 April 2010 16 | Monterrey | 2–1 | América | Monterrey |
| 17:00 | Santana 54'; Carreño 70' | Report | Reyna 26' | Stadium: Estadio Tecnológico; Referee: Miguel Ángel Ortega |

| 24 April 2010 17 | Morelia | 1–1 | Monterrey | Morelia |
| 19:00 | Borgetti 45' | Report | Cardozo 23' | Stadium: Estadio Morelos; Referee: Marco Antonio Rodríguez |

===== Liguilla =====
====== Quarterfinals ======
| 1 May 2010 First leg | Pachuca | 1–0 | Monterrey | Pachuca |
| 17:00 | Álvarez 29' | Report | | Stadium: Estadio Hidalgo; Referee: Jaime Herrera |

| 8 May 2010 Second leg | Monterrey | 1–2 (1–3 agg.) | Pachuca | Monterrey |
| 18:00 | Martínez 33' | Report | Brambila 46'; Montes 87' | Stadium: Estadio Tecnológico; Referee: Paul Enrique Delgadillo |

=== Copa Libertadores ===
==== Group stage ====
| Team | Pld | W | D | L | GF | GA | GD | Pts |
|---|---|---|---|---|---|---|---|---|
| (Brazil) São Paulo | 6 | 4 | 1 | 1 | 9 | 2 | +7 | 13 |
| (Colombia) Once Caldas | 6 | 3 | 2 | 1 | 8 | 5 | +3 | 11 |
| (Mexico) Monterrey | 6 | 1 | 3 | 2 | 5 | 8 | −3 | 6 |
| (Paraguay) Nacional | 6 | 1 | 0 | 5 | 3 | 10 | −7 | 3 |

| 10 February 2010 1 | São Paulo (Brazil) | 2–0 | (Mexico) Monterrey | São Paulo, Brazil |
| 21:50 UTC−02:00 | Washington 12', 76' | Report | | Stadium: Estádio Cícero Pompeu de Toledo; Attendance: 34,501; Referee: Sergio Pezzotta (Argentina) |

| 24 February 2010 2 | Monterrey (Mexico) | 2–1 | (Paraguay) Nacional | Monterrey, Mexico |
| 21:10 UTC−06:00 | Santana 60'; Martínez 68' | Report | Miranda 67' (pen.) | Stadium: Estadio Tecnológico; Attendance: 20,366; Referee: Víctor Rivera (Peru) |

| 10 March 2010 3 | Once Caldas (Colombia) | 1–1 | (Mexico) Monterrey | Manizales, Colombia |
| 17:30 UTC−05:00 | Valencia 58' | Report | Morales 33' | Stadium: Estadio Palogrande; Attendance: 20,127; Referee: Joaquín Antequera (Bolivia) |

| 17 March 2010 4 | Monterrey (Mexico) | 2–2 | (Colombia) Once Caldas | Monterrey, Mexico |
| 21:15 UTC−06:00 | Martínez 18' (pen.); Cardozo 46' | Report | Moreno 1'; Castrillón 66' | Stadium: Estadio Tecnológico; Attendance: 26,725; Referee: Georges Buckley (Peru) |

| 31 March 2010 5 | Monterrey (Mexico) | 0–0 | (Brazil) São Paulo | Monterrey, Mexico |
| 18:50 UTC−06:00 | | Report | | Stadium: Estadio Tecnológico; Attendance: 28,472; Referee: Saúl Laverni (Argentina) |

| 21 April 2010 6 | Nacional (Paraguay) | 2–0 | (Mexico) Monterrey | Asunción, Paraguay |
| 20:50 UTC−04:00 | Paniagua 4'; Beltrán 67' | Report | | Stadium: Estadio Defensores del Chaco; Attendance: 341; Referee: Raúl Orosco (Bolivia) |

== Statistics ==
=== Goals ===
| Rank | Player | Position | Apertura | Bicentenario | Libertadores | Total |
|---|---|---|---|---|---|---|
| 1 | (Mexico) Aldo de Nigris | FW | 11 | 3 | 0 | 14 |
| 2 | (Mexico) Darío Carreño | FW | 4 | 7 | 0 | 11 |
| 2 | (Chile) Humberto Suazo | FW | 11 | 0 | 0 | 11 |
| 4 | (Paraguay) Osvaldo Martínez | MF | 4 | 4 | 2 | 10 |
| 5 | (Argentina) Neri Cardozo | MF | 0 | 4 | 1 | 5 |
| 6 | (Mexico) Luis Pérez | MF | 3 | 1 | 0 | 4 |
| 6 | (Mexico) Sergio Santana | FW | 2 | 1 | 1 | 4 |
| 8 | (Mexico) Héctor Morales | DF | 0 | 2 | 1 | 3 |
| 9 | (Mexico) Jesús Arellano | MF | 0 | 2 | 0 | 2 |
| 9 | (Ecuador) Walter Ayoví | MF | 0 | 2 | 0 | 2 |
| 11 | (Mexico) Juan Carlos Medina | MF | 0 | 1 | 0 | 1 |
| 11 | (Mexico) Severo Meza | DF | 1 | 0 | 0 | 1 |
| 11 | (Brazil) Val Baiano | FW | 0 | 1 | 0 | 1 |
| 11 | (Mexico) Jesús Zavala | MF | 0 | 1 | 0 | 1 |
| Total | | | 36 | 29 | 5 | 70 |

=== Clean sheets ===
| Rank | Name | Apertura | Bicentenario | Libertadores | Total |
|---|---|---|---|---|---|
| 1 | (Mexico) Jonathan Orozco | 7 | 6 | 1 | 14 |

=== Own goals ===
| Player | Against | Result | Date | Competition |
|---|---|---|---|---|
| (Mexico) Diego Ordaz | Chiapas | 1–2 (H) | 17 October 2009 | Primera División |
| (Panama) Felipe Baloy | Santos Laguna | 2–1 (H) | 4 November 2009 | Primera División |
