= 2010–11 C.F. Monterrey season =

The 2010–11 Monterrey season was the 64th professional season of Mexico's top-flight football league. The season is split into two tournaments—the Torneo Apertura and the Torneo Clausura—each with identical formats and each contested by the same eighteen teams. Monterrey began their season on July 24, 2010, against San Luis, Monterrey played their homes games on Saturdays at 5:00pm. Monterrey won their fourth title by defeating Santos Laguna 6–2 in aggregate score on December 5, 2010.

== Torneo Apertura ==
=== Squad ===
Note: Flags indicate national team as defined under FIFA eligibility rules; some limited exceptions apply. Players may hold more than one non-FIFA nationality.

| No. | Pos. | Nation | Player |
|---|---|---|---|
| 1 | GK | MEX | Jonathan Orozco |
| 2 | DF | MEX | Severo Meza |
| 3 | DF | MEX | Pierre Ibarra |
| 4 | DF | MEX | Ricardo Osorio |
| 5 | DF | MEX | Duilio Davino |
| 8 | MF | MEX | Luis Pérez (Captain) |
| 9 | FW | MEX | Aldo de Nigris |
| 10 | MF | PAR | Osvaldo Martínez |
| 11 | FW | MEX | Sergio Santana |
| 13 | FW | MEX | Darío Carreño |
| 15 | DF | ARG | José María Basanta (Vice-Captain) |

| No. | Pos. | Nation | Player |
|---|---|---|---|
| 17 | MF | MEX | Jesús Zavala |
| 18 | MF | ARG | Neri Cardozo |
| 19 | DF | MEX | Héctor Morales |
| 20 | MF | ECU | Walter Ayoví |
| 21 | MF | MEX | Sergio Pérez |
| 22 | DF | MEX | William Paredes |
| 23 | GK | MEX | Juan de Dios Ibarra |
| 26 | FW | CHI | Humberto Suazo |
| 28 | MF | MEX | Jesús Arellano |
| 30 | GK | MEX | Mauricio Aguirre |

=== Apertura 2010 results ===
==== Regular season ====
| July 24, 2010 Round 1 | San Luis | 1 – 1 | Monterrey | Estadio Alfonso Lastras, San Luis Potosí |
| 8:45pm | Aguirre 68' | Report | Suazo 63' | Referee: Paul Delgadillo |

| July 31, 2010 Round 2 | Monterrey | 3 – 2 | Estudiantes Tecos | Estadio Tecnológico, Monterrey |
| 7:00pm | Suazo 47'; Ayoví 59'; Santana 66' | | Bareiro 36'; Zamogilny 90' | Referee: Erim Ramírez |

| August 7, 2010 Round 3 | Atlante | 1 – 2 | Monterrey | Estadio Andrés Quintana Roo, Cancún |
| 9:00pm | Fano 3' | Report | Basanta 13'; Cardozo 52' | Referee: Román Rafael Medina |

| August 14, 2010 Round 4 | Monterrey | 5 – 2 | UNAM | Estadio Tecnológico, Monterrey |
| 7:00pm | Suazo 8', 50' (pen.); Santana 45'; Martínez 76' de Nigris 90' | Report | Leandro 17'; López 23' | Referee: Fernando Guerrero |

| August 21, 2010 Round 5 | Pachuca | 2 – 2 | Monterrey | Estadio Hidalgo, Pachuca |
| 7:00pm | Cvitanich 7'; Arreola 90+1' | Report | Suazo 68' de Nigris 78' | Referee: Ricardo Arellano |

| August 28, 2010 Round 6 | Monterrey | 1 – 1 | Chiapas | Estadio Tecnológico, Monterrey |
| 7:00pm | Suazo 28' | | Danilinho 23' | Referee: Roberto García |

| September 11, 2010 Round 7 | UANL | 0 – 1 | Monterrey | Estadio Universitario, San Nicolás |
| 7:00pm | | Report | Suazo 46' | Referee: Armando Archundia |

| September 18, 2010 Round 8 | Monterrey | 2 – 0 | Atlas | Estadio Tecnológico, Monterrey |
| 7:00pm | de Nigris 52'; Suazo 58' | Report | | Referee: Francisco Chacón |

| September 25, 2010 Round 9 | Querétaro | 0 – 0 | Monterrey | Estadio La Corregidora, Querétaro |
| 5:00pm | | Report | | Referee: Marco Antonio Rodríguez |

| October 2, 2010 Round 10 | Monterrey | 2 – 1 | Necaxa | Estadio Tecnológico, Monterrey |
| 7:00pm | Suazo 12' de Nigris 26' | Report | Quatrocchi 12' | Referee: Mauricio Morales |

| October 10, 2010 Round 11 | América | 0 – 0 | Monterrey | Estadio Azteca, Mexico City |
| 4:30pm | | Report | | Referee: Roberto García Orozco |

| October 16, 2010 Round 12 | Monterrey | 2 – 0 | Toluca | Estadio Tecnológico, Monterrey |
| 9:00pm | Zavala 16'; Gamboa 81' (o.g.) | Report | | Referee: Paul Delgadillo |

| October 23, 2010 Round 13 | Santos Laguna | 1 – 2 | Monterrey | Estadio Corona, Torreón |
| 7:00pm | Benítez 33' | Report | Suazo 4'; Martínez 48' | Referee: Jorge Gasso |

| October 27, 2010 Round 14 | Monterrey | 2 – 4 | Cruz Azul | Estadio Tecnológico, Monterrey |
| 9:00pm | Castro 31'; Villaluz 33', 56'; Villa 44' | Report | de Nigris 40'; Pineda 53' (o.g.) | Referee: Miguel Ángel Ayala |

| October 31, 2010 Round 15 | Morelia | 0 – 2 | Monterrey | Estadio Morelos, Morelia |
| 12:00pm | | Report | Carreño 32'; Cardozo 89' | Referee: Ricardo Arellano |

| November 6, 2010 Round 16 | Puebla | 2 – 0 | Monterrey | Estadio Cuauhtémoc, Puebla |
| 12:00pm | Ayala 28'; Corona 90+1' | Report | | Referee: Roberto García |

| November 13, 2010 Round 17 | Monterrey | 2 – 3 | Guadalajara | Estadio Tecnológico, Monterrey |
| 5:00pm | de Nigris 11'; Ayoví 33' | Reporty | Arellano 55'; Fabián 66', 90+1' | Referee: Miguel Ángel Flores |

=== Final phase ===
| November 18, 2010 Quarterfinals | Pachuca | 1 – 1 | Monterrey | Estadio Hidalgo, Pachuca |
| 6:00pm | Azrizala 77' | Report | Basanta 56' | Referee: Paul Delgadillo |

| November 21, 2010 Quarterfinals | Monterrey | 3 – 3 | Pachuca | Estadio Tecnológico, Monterrey |
| 4:00pm | Suazo 19' de Nigris 36'; Cardozo 56' | Report | Azrizala 25', 84', 89' | Referee: Armando Archundia |

Monterrey advanced due to being the higher seed in the classification phase

| November 25, 2010 Semifinals | UNAM | 0 – 0 | Monterrey | Estadio Olímpico Universitario, Mexico City |
| 9:00pm | | Report | | Referee: Roberto García |

| November 28, 2010 Semifinals | Monterrey | 2 – 0 | UNAM | Estadio Tecnológico, Monterrey |
| 8:00pm | Suazo 88'; Cardozo 90' | Report | | Referee: Marco Antonio Rodríguez |

Monterrey won 2–0 on aggregate

| December 2, 2010 Finals | Santos Laguna | 3 – 2 | Monterrey | Estadio Corona, Torreón |
| 8:00pm | Estrada 23'; Quintero 41'; Davino 85' (o.g.) | Report | Suazo 32'; Cardozo 54' | Referee: Marco Antonio Rodríguez |

| December 5, 2010 Finals | Monterrey | 3 – 0 | Santos Laguna | Estadio Tecnológico, Monterrey |
| 8:00pm | Suazo 28', 85'; Basanta 72' | Report | | Referee: Marco Antonio Rodríguez |

Monterrey won 5–3 on aggregate

=== Goalscorers ===
| Position | Nation | Name | Goals scored |
|---|---|---|---|
| 1. | (Chile) | Humberto Suazo | 15 |
| 2. | (Mexico) | Aldo de Nigris | 6 |
| 3. | (Argentina) | Neri Cardozo | 5 |
| 4. | (Argentina) | José María Basanta | 3 |
| 5. | (Ecuador) | Walter Ayoví | 2 |
| 5. | (Paraguay) | Osvaldo Martínez | 2 |
| 5. | (Mexico) | Sergio Santana | 2 |
| 5. | | Own Goal | 2 |
| 9. | (Mexico) | Darío Carreño | 1 |
| 9. | (Argentina) | Jesús Zavala | 1 |
| TOTAL | | | 35 |

=== Regular season statistics ===
==== Results summary ====
| Overall | | | | | | | | Home | | | | | | Away | | | | | |
| Pld | W | D | L | GF | GA | GD | Pts | W | D | L | GF | GA | GD | W | D | L | GF | GA | GD |
|---|---|---|---|---|---|---|---|---|---|---|---|---|---|---|---|---|---|---|---|
| 17 | 9 | 5 | 3 | 29 | 20 | +9 | 32 | 5 | 1 | 2 | 19 | 13 | +6 | 4 | 4 | 1 | 10 | 7 | +3 |

Last updated: 15 January 2011.
Source: Apertura 2010 results

==== Results by round ====
| Round | 1 | 2 | 3 | 4 | 5 | 6 | 7 | 8 | 9 | 10 | 11 | 12 | 13 | 14 | 15 | 16 | 17 |
|---|---|---|---|---|---|---|---|---|---|---|---|---|---|---|---|---|---|
| Ground | A | H | A | H | A | H | A | H | A | H | A | H | A | H | A | A | H |
| Result | D | W | W | W | D | D | W | W | D | W | D | W | W | L | W | L | L |
| Position | 10 | 5 | 3 | 2 | 3 | 3 | 3 | 3 | 2 | 2 | 2 | 2 | 2 | 2 | 2 | 2 | 2 |

Updated to match(es) played on 15 January 2011. Source: Apertura 2010 results and mediotiempo.com
A = Away; H = Home; W = Win; D = Draw; L = Loss

== Torneo Clausura ==
=== Squad ===
For recent transfers, see List of Mexican Football Transfers Summer 2010. Note: Flags indicate national team as defined under FIFA eligibility rules; some limited exceptions apply. Players may hold more than one non-FIFA nationality.

| No. | Pos. | Nation | Player |
|---|---|---|---|
| 1 | GK | MEX | Jonathan Orozco |
| 2 | DF | MEX | Severo Meza |
| 4 | DF | MEX | Ricardo Osorio |
| 5 | DF | MEX | Duilio Davino |
| 6 | DF | MEX | Héctor Morales |
| 8 | MF | MEX | Luis Ernesto Pérez (Team captain) |
| 9 | FW | MEX | Aldo de Nigris |
| 10 | MF | PAR | Osvaldo Martínez |
| 11 | FW | MEX | Sergio Santana |
| 13 | FW | MEX | Abraham Darío Carreño |
| 14 | DF | MEX | Eduardo Guevara |
| 15 | DF | ARG | José María Basanta (Team Vice-Captain) |
| 16 | MF | MEX | Luis Alfonso Rodríguez |

| No. | Pos. | Nation | Player |
|---|---|---|---|
| 17 | MF | MEX | Jesús Eduardo Zavala |
| 18 | MF | ARG | Neri Cardozo |
| 20 | MF | ECU | Walter Ayoví |
| 21 | DF | MEX | Hiram Mier |
| 22 | DF | MEX | William Paredes |
| 23 | GK | MEX | Juan de Dios Ibarra |
| 24 | DF | MEX | Sergio Pérez |
| 25 | DF | MEX | César Martínez |
| 26 | FW | CHI | Humberto Suazo |
| 28 | MF | MEX | Jesús Arellano (Club captain) |
| 30 | GK | MEX | Mauricio Aguirre |
| 33 | MF | MEX | Marvin Leonardo Piñón |
| 68 | MF | MEX | Jesús Manuel Corona |

=== Clausura 2011 results ===
==== Regular season ====
| January 8, 2011 Round 1 | Monterrey | 0 – 2 | San Luis | Estadio Tecnológico, Monterrey |
| 5:00pm | | Report | Mares 73'; Medina 90+3' | Referee: Jorge Isaac Rojas |

| January 14, 2011 Round 2 | Estudiantes Tecos | 3 – 2 | Monterrey | Estadio Tres de Marzo, Zapopan |
| 8:10pm | Cejas 24', 45' (pen.); Cabral 28' | Report | Santana 22', 58' | Referee: Miguel Ángel Chacón |

| January 22, 2011 Round 3 | Monterrey | 1 – 0 | Atlante | Estadio Tecnológico, Monterrey |
| 5:00pm | Suazo 2' | Report | | Referee: Miguel Ángel Flores |

| January 30, 2011 Round 4 | UNAM | 3 – 2 | Monterrey | Estadio Olímpico Universitario, Mexico City |
| 5:00pm | Cacho 26'; Bravo 40'; Cortés 54' | Report | Suazo 28' (pen.); Martínez 87' | Referee: Mauricio Morales |

| February 5, 2011 Round 5 | Monterrey | 2 – 0 | Pachuca | Estadio Tecnológico, Monterrey |
| 5:00pm | de Nigris 26'; Cardozo 49' | Report | | Referee: Erim Ramírez |

| February 12, 2011 Round 6 | Chiapas | 1 – 4 | Monterrey | Estadio Victor Manuel Reyna, Tuxtla Gutierrez |
| 7:00pm | Valdés 36' | Report | Suazo 9', 31' (pen.), 78' de Nigris 81' | Referee: Roberto García |

| February 19, 2011 Round 7 | Monterrey | 0 – 0 | UANL | Estadio Tecnológico, Monterrey |
| 5:00pm | | Report | | Referee: Miguel Ángel Ortega |

| February 26, 2011 Round 8 | Atlas | 1 – 0 | Monterrey | Estadio Jalisco, Guadalajara |
| 8:45pm | Espinoza 45+2' | Report | | Referee: Paul Delgadillo |

| March 5, 2011 Round 9 | Monterrey | 2 – 0 | Querétaro | Estadio Tecnológico, Monterrey |
| 5:00pm | Carreño 48'; Pérez 74' | Report | | Referee: Mauricio Morales |

| March 11, 2011 Round 10 | Necaxa | 0 – 1 | Monterrey | Estadio Victoria, Aguascalientes |
| 8:10pm | | Report | de Nigris 46' | Referee: Marco Antonio Rodríguez |

| March 19, 2011 Round 11 | Monterrey | 2 – 1 | América | Estadio Tecnológico, Monterrey |
| 5:00pm | Ayoví 47'; Carreño 69' | Report | Reyna 89' (pen.) | Referee: Francisco Chacón |

| April 3, 2011 Round 12 | Toluca | 1 − 1 | Monterrey | Estadio Nemesio Díez, Toluca |
| 12:00pm | Ayoví 73' | Report | de Nigris 4' | Referee: Miguel Ángel Chacón |

| April 9, 2011 Round 13 | Monterrey | 1 − 1 | Santos Laguna | Estadio Tecnológico, Monterrey |
| 5:00pm | Arellano 23' | Report | Peralta 9' | Referee: Mauricio Rafael Morales |

| April 13, 2011 Round 14 | Cruz Azul | 3 − 0 | Monterrey | Estadio Azul, Mexico City |
| 8:30pm | Giménez 27', 68'; Villa 71' | | | Referee: Jorge Eduardo Gasso |

| April 16, 2011 Round 15 | Monterrey | 1 − 1 | Morelia | Estadio Tecnológico, Monterrey |
| 7:00pm | Cardozo 28' | Report | Rey 90+3' (pen.) | Referee: Marco Antonio Rodríguez |

| April 23, 2011 Round 16 | Monterrey | 1 − 1 | Puebla | Estadio Tecnológico, Monterrey |
| 7:00pm | Zavala 23' | Report | Borja 7' | Referee: Erim Ramírez |

| April 30, 2011 Round 17 | Guadalajara | 2 – 3 | Monterrey | Estadio Omnilife, Zapopan |
| 7:00pm | Fabián 3', 82' | Report | Osorio 45'; Zavala 72'; Ayoví 89' | Referee: Miguel Ángel Ortega |

==== Final phase ====
| May 5, 2011 Quarterfinals | Monterrey | 3 − 1 | UNAM | Estadio Tecnológico, Monterrey |
| 7:00pm | Martínez 11'; Ayoví 21'; Suazo 47' | Report | Bravo 69' | Referee: Juan Genaro Medrano |

| May 8, 2011 Quarterfinals | UNAM | 2 – 0 | Monterrey | Estadio Olímpico Universitario, Mexico City |
| 12:00pm | Velarde 6'; Fuentes 73' | Report | | Referee: Francisco Chacón |

UNAM advanced due to being the higher seed in the classification phase

== CONCACAF Champions League ==
=== Group stage ===
| August 17, 2010 1 | Monterrey (Mexico) | 1 – 0 | (Costa Rica) Saprissa | Estadio Tecnológico, Monterrey |
| 22:00 | de Nigris 25' | Report | | Attendance: 12,042; Referee: Ricardo Salazar (United States) |

| August 25, 2010 2 | Seattle Sounders FC (United States) | 0 – 2 | (Mexico) Monterrey | Qwest Field, Seattle |
| 22:00 | | Report | Cardozo 41' de Nigris 58' | Attendance: 22,513; Referee: Joel Aguilar (El Salvador) |

| September 14, 2010 3 | Monterrey (Mexico) | 2 – 0 | (Honduras) Marathón | Estadio Tecnológico, Monterrey |
| 20:00 | de Nigris 23'; Paredes 55' | Report | | Attendance: 9,628; Referee: Raymond Bogle (Jamaica) |

| September 22, 2010 4 | Monterrey (Mexico) | 3 – 2 | (United States) Seattle Sounders FC | Estadio Tecnológico, Monterrey |
| 20:00 | de Nigris 74'; Suazo 75'; Pérez 78' (pen.) | Report | Pérez 28' (o.g.); Fucito 44' | Attendance: 19,697; Referee: Marlon Mejia (Honduras) |

| September 28, 2010 5 | Saprissa (Costa Rica) | 2 – 2 | (Mexico) Monterrey | Estadio Ricardo Saprissa Aymá, San José |
| 22:00 | Meza 16' (o.g.); Mena 65' | Report | Rodríguez 5'; Carreño 31' | Attendance: 1,635; Referee: Terry Vaughn (United States) |

| October 20, 2010 6 | Marathón (Honduras) | 0 – 1 | (Mexico) Monterrey | Estadio Olímpico Metropolitano, San Pedro Sula |
| 22:00 | | Report | Santana 69' | Attendance: 500; Referee: Walter Lopez (Guatemala) |

==== Table ====
| Team | Pld | W | D | L | GF | GA | GD | Pts |
|---|---|---|---|---|---|---|---|---|
| (Mexico) Monterrey | 6 | 5 | 1 | 0 | 11 | 4 | +7 | 16 |
| (Costa Rica) Saprissa | 6 | 3 | 1 | 2 | 11 | 7 | +4 | 10 |
| (Honduras) Marathón | 6 | 2 | 0 | 4 | 5 | 11 | −6 | 6 |
| (United States) Seattle Sounders FC | 6 | 1 | 0 | 5 | 6 | 11 | −5 | 3 |

==== Results by round ====
| Round | 1 | 2 | 3 | 4 | 5 | 6 |
|---|---|---|---|---|---|---|
| Ground | H | A | H | H | A | A |
| Result | W | W | W | W | D | W |
| Position | 2 | 1 | 1 | 1 | 1 | 1 |

Updated to match(es) played on 2 March 2011. Source: 2010–11 CONCACAF Champions League results
A = Away; H = Home; W = Win; D = Draw; L = Loss

=== Knockout stage ===
| February 23, 2011 QF | Toluca (Mexico) | 0 – 1 | (Mexico) Monterrey | Estadio Nemesio Díez, Toluca |
| 20:00 | | Report | Martínez 82' | Attendance: 11,236; Referee: Francisco Chacón |

| March 2, 2011 QF | Monterrey (Mexico) | 1 – 0 (2 – 0 agg.) | (Mexico) Toluca | Estadio Tecnológico, Monterrey |
| 20:00 | Cardozo 88' | Report | | Referee: Marco Antonio Rodríguez |

| March 16, 2011 SF | Monterrey (Mexico) | 2 − 1 | (Mexico) Cruz Azul | Estadio Tecnológico, Monterrey |
| 22:00 | Cardozo 9'; Santana 55' | Report | Cortés 48' | Referee: Paul Delgadillo |

| April 6, 2011 SF | Cruz Azul (Mexico) | 1 − 1 (3 – 2 agg.) | (Mexico) Monterrey | Estadio Azul, Mexico City |
| 20:00 | Villaluz 23' | Report | Suazo 81' (pen.) | Referee: Francisco Chacón |

| April 20, 2011 F | Monterrey (Mexico) | 2 – 2 | (United States) Real Salt Lake | Estadio Tecnológico, Monterrey |
| 21:00 | de Negris 18'; Suazo 63' (pen.) | Report | Borchers 35'; Morales 89' | Attendance: 30,327; Referee: (El Salvador) Joel Aguilar |

| April 27, 2011 F | Real Salt Lake (United States) | 0 – 1 (2 – 3 agg.) | (Mexico) Monterrey | Rio Tinto Stadium, Sandy |
| 20:00 | | Report | Suazo 44' | Attendance: 20,378; Referee: (Panama) Roberto Moreno |

=== Goalscorers ===
Clausura 2011 and Champions League Knockout Stage

| Position | Nation | Name | Goals scored |
|---|---|---|---|
| 1. | (Chile) | Humberto Suazo | 8 |
| 2. | (Mexico) | Aldo de Nigris | 5 |
| 3. | (Argentina) | Neri Cardozo | 4 |
| 4. | (Mexico) | Sergio Santana | 3 |
| 4. | (Ecuador) | Walter Ayoví | 3 |
| 4. | (Paraguay) | Osvaldo Martínez | 3 |
| 7. | (Mexico) | Darío Carreño | 2 |
| 7. | (Mexico) | Jesús Zavala | 2 |
| 9. | (Mexico) | Jesús Arellano | 1 |
| 9. | (Mexico) | Ricardo Osorio | 1 |
| 9. | (Mexico) | Luis Ernesto Pérez | 1 |
| TOTAL | | | 33 |

=== Regular season statistics ===
==== Results summary ====
| Overall | | | | | | | | Home | | | | | | Away | | | | | |
| Pld | W | D | L | GF | GA | GD | Pts | W | D | L | GF | GA | GD | W | D | L | GF | GA | GD |
|---|---|---|---|---|---|---|---|---|---|---|---|---|---|---|---|---|---|---|---|
| 17 | 7 | 5 | 5 | 23 | 20 | +3 | 26 | 4 | 4 | 1 | 10 | 5 | +5 | 3 | 1 | 4 | 13 | 15 | −2 |

Last updated: 6 May 2011.
Source: Clausura 2011 results

==== Results by round ====
| Round | 1 | 2 | 3 | 4 | 5 | 6 | 7 | 8 | 9 | 10 | 11 | 12 | 13 | 14 | 15 | 16 | 17 |
|---|---|---|---|---|---|---|---|---|---|---|---|---|---|---|---|---|---|
| Ground | H | A | H | A | H | A | H | A | H | A | H | A | H | A | H | H | A |
| Result | L | L | W | L | W | W | D | L | W | W | W | D | D | L | D | D | W |
| Position | 15 | 18 | 14 | 17 | 11 | 9 | 10 | 10 | 7 | 5 | 5 | 5 | 4 | 7 | 7 | 8 | 7 |

Updated to match(es) played on 6 May 2011. Source: Clausura 2011 results and mediotiempo.com
A = Away; H = Home; W = Win; D = Draw; L = Loss
