= Carreño (disambiguation) =

Carreño can refer to:

== People ==
- Amalio Carreño (b. 1964), Venezuelan baseball player
- Ángel Carreño (b. 1980), Chilean footballer
- Angelina Carreño (b. 1981), Mexican politician
- Ariel Carreño (b. 1979), Argentine footballer
- Carlos Carreño (b. 1973), Spanish volleyball player
- Darío Carreño (b. 1988), Mexican footballer
- Enrique Carreño (b. 1986), Spanish footballer
- Fernando Carreño (b. 1979), Italian-Uruguayan footballer
- Inocente Carreño (1919–2016), Venezuelan composer
- Jaime Carreño (b. 1997), Chilean footballer
- Joel Carreño (b. 1987), Dominican baseball player
- José Carreño (painter) (b. 1947), Ecuadorian painter
- José Daniel Carreño (b. 1963), Uruguayan football manager
- José Luis Carreño (1905-1986), Spanish Catholic missionary
- José Manuel Carreño (b. 1968), Cuban-American ballet dancer
- José María Carreño (1792-1840), Venezuelan politician and military
- José Suárez Carreño (1915-2002), Spanish-Mexican writer
- Juan Carreño Lara (1909-1940), Mexican footballer
- Juan Carreño López (b. 1968), Chilean footballer
- Juan Carreño de Miranda (1614–1685), Spanish painter
- Luis Carreño, Spanish-language voice actor
- Manuel Antonio Carreño (1812–1864), Venezuelan musician and diplomat
- Mario Carreño y Morales (1913-1999), Cuban painter
- Pablo Carreño Busta (b. 1991), Spanish tennis player
- Rafael Ramírez Carreño (b. 1963), Venezuelan engineer and politician
- Teresa Carreño (1853-1917), Venezuelan pianist, singer, composer, and conductor
- Víctor A. Carreño (b. 1956), Dominican NASA Aerospace Engineer and Aerospace Technologist

== Places ==
- Carreño, a city in Spain
- Puerto Carreño, capital of Vichada, Colombia
