= Sergio Santana =

Mexican footballer and manager (born 1979)

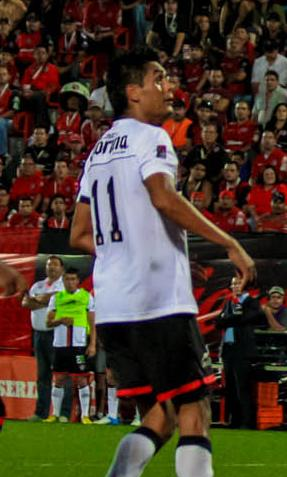
- Santana playing for Atlas in 2012

Personal information
- Full name: Sergio Alejandro Santana Piedra
- Date of birth: 10 August 1979 (age 47)
- Place of birth: Rio Grande, Zacatecas, Mexico
- Height: 1.80 m (5 ft 11 in)
- Position: Forward

Senior career*
Years	Team	Apps	(Gls)
1999–2005	Pachuca	150	(38)
2006–2008	Guadalajara	115	(24)
2009	Toluca	15	(4)
2009–2011	Monterrey	70	(8)
2012	Atlas	29	(13)
2013–2014	Morelia	15	(9)
2013–2014	→ Chiapas (loan)	13	(6)
2014	→ Querétaro (loan)	22	(12)
2015–2016	Zacatecas	31	(20)
Total		460	(134)

International career
2004–2009	Mexico	10	(5)

Managerial career
- 2018–2019: Mineros de Zacatecas Premier (Assistant)
- 2019–2020: Mineros de Zacatecas (Assistant)
- 2020–2021: Oaxaca (Assistant)
- 2024–2026: Pachuca (women) (Assistant)
- * Club domestic league appearances and goals

Sergio Alejandro Santana Piedra (born 10 August 1979) is a Mexican former professional footballer and assistant manager of Liga de Expansión MX club Oaxaca. He formerly played as a forward.

== Club career ==
Santana first match in the Primera División de México was with C.F. Pachuca on 7 May 2000, against Toluca. He played with C.F. Pachuca for almost five years, from 2000 to 2005. He was transferred to Chivas de Guadalajara for the Clausura 2006 Tournament at the end of 2005. Sergio was a versatile player for Chivas, playing as a forward, striker, center attacking midfielder, and even as a defensive midfielder on occasions.

Santana stated his desire to leave Chivas following the arrival of Carlos Ochoa, and several months later, it was announced that he would go to Deportivo Toluca F.C. In Santana's first match for Toluca, he scored a goal against Monarcas Morelia. The match ended in a draw at a goal each.

On June 17, 2009, during the Mexican Football draft in Cancun, the Monterrey announced that Santana was to join their squad. With Monterrey, he won a couple of championships and a Concacaf Champions League in 2010.

Santana's last Mexican club was Club Atlas. He had a poor performance, as did the entire squad, in the Clausura 2012.

On 24 August 2016, Santana played his last game against Club América in a group stage match of the 2016 Copa MX Apertura. He was the captain and was replaced at the 44th minute. He finished up his career with a total of 451 matches and having played with nine clubs.

== International career ==
Santana represented the Mexico national team in a game against China on 16 April 2008, making his seventh appearance since Ricardo LaVolpe called him for El Tri.

== Career statistics ==
=== International ===
Appearances and goals by national team and year
National team	Year	Apps	Goals
Mexico	2004	6	4
Mexico	2005	–	
Mexico	2006	–	
Mexico	2007	–	
Mexico	2008	3	0
Mexico	2009	1	1
Total		10	5

Scores and results list Mexico's goal tally first, score column indicates score after each Santana goal.

List of international goals scored by Sergio Santana
No.	Date	Venue	Opponent	Score	Result	Competition
1	6 October 2004	Estadio Hidalgo, Pachuca, Mexico	Saint Vincent and the Grenadines	6–0	7–0	2006 FIFA World Cup qualification
2	13 November 2004	Miami Orange Bowl, Miami, United States	Saint Kitts and Nevis	3–0	5–0	2006 FIFA World Cup qualification
3	13 November 2004	Miami Orange Bowl, Miami, United States	Saint Kitts and Nevis	5–0	5–0	2006 FIFA World Cup qualification
4	17 November 2004	Estadio Tecnológico, Monterey, Mexico	Saint Kitts and Nevis	7–0	8–0	2006 FIFA World Cup qualification
5	11 March 2009	Dick's Sporting Goods Park, Commerce City, United States	Bolivia	4–1	5–1	Friendly

== Honours ==
Pachuca

- Mexican Primera División: Apertura 2003
- CONCACAF Champions' Cup: 2002

Guadalajara

- Mexican Primera División: Apertura 2006

Toluca

- Mexican Primera División: Apertura 2008

Monterrey

- Mexican Primera División: Apertura 2009, Apertura 2010
- CONCACAF Champions League: 2010–11
- InterLiga: 2010
