= Jesús Zavala (footballer) =

Mexican footballer (born 1987)

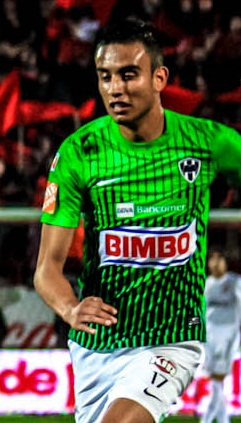
- Zavala playing for Monterrey in 2012

Personal information
- Full name: Jesús Eduardo Zavala Castañeda
- Date of birth: 21 July 1987 (age 39)
- Place of birth: Monterrey, Nuevo León, Mexico
- Height: 1.91 m (6 ft 3 in)
- Position: Defensive midfielder

Youth career
- Monterrey
- Cobras Cd. Juárez

Senior career*
Years	Team	Apps	(Gls)
2005	Cobras Cd. Juárez	7	(3)
2006–2018	Monterrey	250	(17)
2018	→ Zacatecas (loan)	3	(0)
2019–2020	Puebla	40	(0)
2020–2021	Juárez	16	(0)
2021–2022	Mazatlán	14	(0)
Total		330	(20)

International career^{‡}
2011	Mexico U23	5	(1)
2011–2016	Mexico	31	(2)
Medal record
Representing Mexico
Pan American Games
Gold medal – first place	2011 Guadalajara	Team competition
CONCACAF Gold Cup
Winner	CONCACAF Gold Cup	2011
- * Club domestic league appearances and goals as of 29 April 2022 ‡ National team caps and goals as of 21 May 2016

Jesús Eduardo Zavala Castañeda (Note: In this Spanish name, the first or paternal surname is Zavala and the second or maternal family name is Castañeda.) (born 21 July 1987) is a Mexican former professional footballer who played as a defensive midfielder.

== Club career ==
=== Monterrey ===
Zavala made his debut with Monterrey in the Clausura 2006 against Toluca. He began playing as a forward, subsequently being moved to the midfield by Víctor Manuel Vucetich.

=== Club Puebla ===
Club Puebla announced in the beginning of January 2019, that they had signed Zavala.

== International career ==
After having an exceptional tournament with Monterrey where he helped the team win the Apertura 2010, Zavala appeared in the first list of Mexico coach, José Manuel de la Torre. He eventually played in the 2011 Gold Cup, including the final against the United States where Mexico won 4–2. He scored his first goal on June 12, 2012, against El Salvador.

== Career statistics ==
=== International ===
As of match played 11 February 2016

National team	Year	Apps	Goals
Mexico	2011	6	0
Mexico	2012	10	2
Mexico	2013	12	0
Mexico	2014	2	0
Mexico	2016	1	0
Total		31	2

=== International goals ===
Scores and results list Mexico's goal tally first.

Goal	Date	Venue	Opponent	Score	Result	Competition
1.	12 June 2012	Estadio Cuscatlán, San Salvador, El Salvador	El Salvador	1–0	2–1	2014 FIFA World Cup qualification
2.	7 September 2012	Estadio Nacional de Costa Rica, San José, Costa Rica	Costa Rica	2–0	2–0	2014 FIFA World Cup qualification

== Honours ==
Monterrey

- Mexican Primera División: Apertura 2009, Apertura 2010
- Copa MX: Apertura 2017
- InterLiga: 2010
- CONCACAF Champions League: 2010–11, 2011–12, 2012–13

Mexico U23

- Pan American Games: 2011

Mexico

- CONCACAF Gold Cup: 2011
