= Condemned (1953 film) =

- Directed by: Manuel Mur Oti
- Written by: Manuel Mur Oti
- Based on: Condemned by José Suárez Carreño
- Starring: Aurora Bautista; Carlos Lemos
- Cinematography: Manuel Berenguer
- Edited by: Antonio Gimeno
- Production company: Cervantes Films
- Distributed by: CIFESA
- Release date: 16 November 1953
- Running time: 95 minutes
- Country: Spain
- Language: Spanish

Condemned (Spanish: Condenados) is a Spanish 1953 rural melodrama film directed by Manuel Mur Oti and written by José Suárez Carreño and Mur Oti from a Suarez Carreño's play of the same title. The picture stars Carlos Lemos, Aurora Bautista and José Suárez.

== Plot ==
An aging and wealthy farmer (Lemos) sees how his young wife (Bautista) falls increasingly attracted to a newly hired and handsome laborer (Suarez). The conflict ends up unavoidably in a murder of passion.

== Cast ==
- Aurora Bautista as Aurelia
- Carlos Lemos as José
- José Suárez as Juan
- Félix Fernández as Tabernero
- Aníbal Vela

Carlos Lemos was a very prominent stage actor, and this was one of his few film appearances. Aurora Bautista was by then the Spanish Queen of melodrama, while José Suárez was one of the main heartthrobs of the Spanish screens.

== Bibliography ==
- Bentley, Bernard. A Companion to Spanish Cinema. Boydell & Brewer 2008.
