= Luis Ernesto Pérez =

Mexican footballer and manager (born 1981)

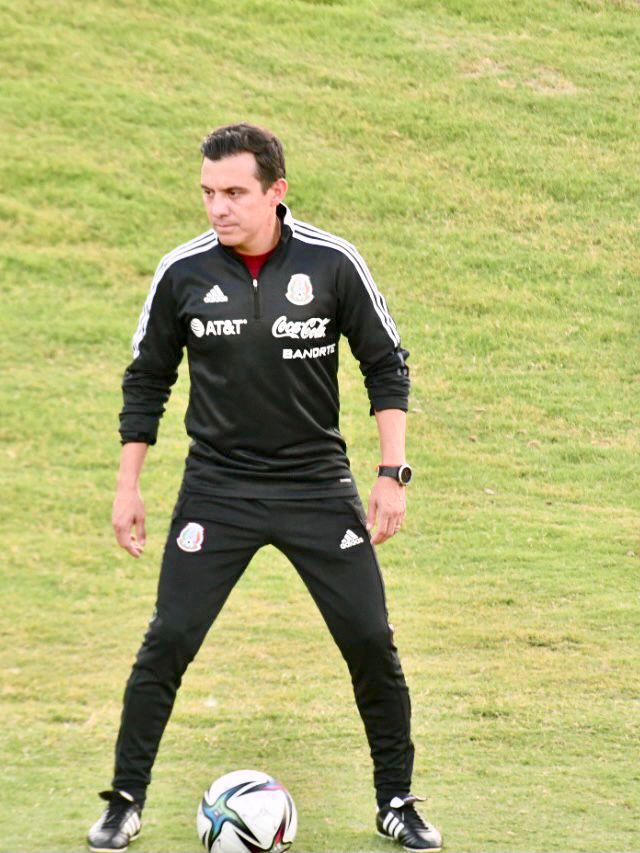
- Pérez in 2021

Personal information
- Full name: Luis Ernesto Pérez Gómez
- Date of birth: 12 January 1981 (age 45)
- Place of birth: Mexico City, Mexico
- Height: 1.71 m (5 ft 7 in)
- Position: Midfielder

Senior career*
Years	Team	Apps	(Gls)
1999–2003	Necaxa	114	(13)
2003–2012	Monterrey	323	(51)
2012–2013	Guadalajara	25	(0)
2013	→ Querétaro (loan)	17	(0)
2014	→ Chiapas (loan)	18	(0)
2015–2016	Monterrey	12	(0)
Total		509	(64)

International career
1997	Mexico U17	3	(1)
2004	Mexico U23	3	(0)
1998–2011	Mexico	69	(8)

Managerial career
- 2020–2021: Mexico U17
- 2021–2022: Mexico U20
- 2023: Toluca (Assistant)
- 2024: Santos Laguna (Assistant)
- 2024–2025: Atlético Nacional (Assistant)
- 2025–2026: UNAM (Assistant)
- * Club domestic league appearances and goals

Luis Ernesto Pérez Gómez (born 12 January 1981) is a Mexican former professional footballer and current manager.

== Club career ==
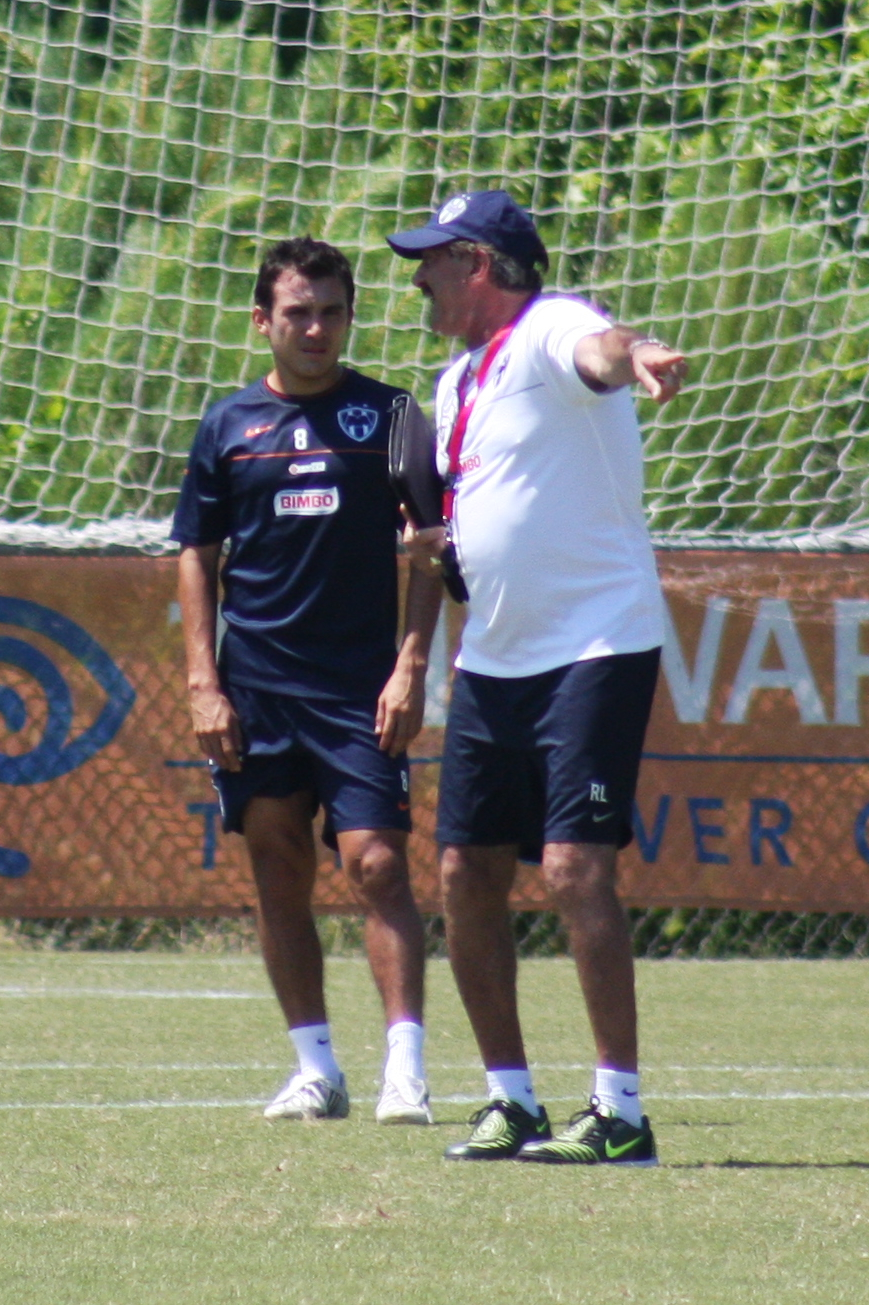
Pérez alongside Monterrey manager Ricardo La Volpe in 2008

Pérez debuted in the Primera División with Necaxa in the 1999 Invierno season, playing his first game 21 September in a 3–1 victory against Santos Laguna. Pérez finished the season having played in 11 games, and by the beginning of the next year had a firm grip of the starting position. Pérez was named rookie of the tournament at the end of the season. Pérez played the next four years with Necaxa, until, to the surprise of many, was sold to Monterrey for the Clausura 2003, where he led Monterrey to win the championship by defeating Morelia at Estadio Morelos in Morelia. In the championship season, Pérez appeared in 23 matches, scored two goals and registered an assist. As with Necaxa, Pérez has been in the Monterrey lineup since his arrival.

In 2009, he wore the captain armband as he and his team won the Apertura 2009 tournament by beating Cruz Azul at Estadio Azul in Mexico City. In the championship season, Pérez appeared in 18 matches, scored three goals and registered two assists. He also won the 2010 InterLiga with Monterrey, beating América in penalty kicks, that qualified Monterrey into the 2010 Copa Libertadores. On June he became property of Guadalajara, by an agreement between the manager of Monterrey and the sporting director of Chivas, Michel Leaño. On 7 July he scored his first goal with Guadalajara.

On 13 December 2016, Pérez announced his retirement from professional soccer.

== International career ==
Perez made his debut with the senior national team on 17 November 1998 in a friendly against El Salvador in Los Angeles. Uncapped through the next two years, he reemerged in 2000. His first official tournament was the 2001 FIFA Confederations Cup, where Mexico did not win any matches. Pérez made appearances for the team in the Gold Cup in 2003, and playing for the U-23 team in the 2004 Summer Olympics. Pérez appeared in the 2005 FIFA Confederations Cup where he played in all five matches, including assisting Jared Borgetti in a losing effort against Germany in the third place match. Pérez was included by then coach Ricardo Lavolpe in the 2006 FIFA World Cup squad. He came on in the 45th minute for Gerardo Torrado in the first match against Iran. Pérez did not appear in the second match against Angola, which Mexico and Angola drew 0–0, however he started the third match against Portugal, but he was sent-off in the 61st minute. Mexico lost the match 2–1. He was banned for the round of 16 match against Argentina because of his red card against Portugal. He was called up for the friendly against Bosnia and Herzegovina on 9 February 2011, and was subbed on for Javier "Chicharito" Hernández in the 80th minute. He played the rest of the match which Mexico won 2–0. He was called up for the 2011 CONCACAF Gold Cup but had to withdraw due to an injury.

== Managerial career ==
After retiring from playing, Pérez became assistant coach of CD Toledo in Spain's Tercera División.

In August 2020, Pérez became head coach of the under-17 national team, following the departure of Marco Antonio Ruiz.

== Career statistics ==
=== International ===
As of match played 27 May 2012

National team	Year	Apps	Goals
Mexico	1998	2	0
Mexico	2000	3	1
Mexico	2001	1	0
Mexico	2003	11	0
Mexico	2004	8	3
Mexico	2005	20	3
Mexico	2006	9	1
Mexico	2008	10	0
Mexico	2009	2	0
Mexico	2011	2	0
Mexico	2012	1	0
Total		69	8

=== International goals ===
Scores and results list Mexico's goal tally first.

Goal	Date	Venue	Opponent	Score	Result	Competition
1.	June 7, 2000	Cotton Bowl, Dallas, United States	South Africa	2–0	4–0	2000 Nike U.S. Cup
2.	November 17, 2004	Estadio Tecnológico, Monterrey, Mexico	Saint Kitts and Nevis	2–0	8–0	2006 FIFA World Cup qualification
3.	November 17, 2004	Estadio Tecnológico, Monterrey, Mexico	Saint Kitts and Nevis	4–0	8–0	2006 FIFA World Cup qualification
4.	November 17, 2004	Estadio Tecnológico, Monterrey, Mexico	Saint Kitts and Nevis	8–0	8–0	2006 FIFA World Cup qualification
5.	June 8, 2005	Estadio Universitario, San Nicolás, Mexico	Trinidad and Tobago	2–0	2–0	2006 FIFA World Cup qualification
6.	September 7, 2005	Estadio Azteca, Mexico City, Mexico	Panama	1–0	5–0	2006 FIFA World Cup qualification
7.	October 26, 2005	Estadio Jalisco, Guadalajara, Mexico	Uruguay	3–1	3–1	Friendly
8.	January 26, 2006	Monster Park, San Francisco, United States	Norway	2–1	2–1	Friendly

== Honours ==
=== Player ===
Monterrey

- Mexican Primera División: Clausura 2003, Apertura 2009, Apertura 2010
- CONCACAF Champions League: 2010–11, 2011–12

Mexico U23

- CONCACAF Olympic Qualifying Championship: 2004

Mexico

- CONCACAF Gold Cup: 2003

Individual

- Mexican Primera División Best Rookie: Invierno 1999
- Mexican Primera División Best Attacking Midfieleder: Clausura 2003, Apertura 2005
- Mexican Primera División Best Defensive Midfieleder: Apertura 2010
- CONCACAF Gold Cup Best XI: 2005
- CONCACAF Men's Olympic Qualifying Championship Best XI: 2004

=== Manager ===
Mexico U20

- Revelations Cup: 2021
