= José Suárez Carreño =

Spanish writer (1915–2002)

José Suárez Carreño (Note: In this Spanish name, the first or paternal surname is Suárez and the second or maternal family name is Carreño.) (1915–2002) was a Spanish writer associated with the Generation of '36 movement. He was born in Guadalupe, Nuevo León, Mexico, but lived in Madrid from an early age.

== Awards ==
He was awarded the

- Adonais Prize in 1943 for his book Edad del hombre (age of man)
- Nadal Prize in 1949 for his book Las últimas horas (the last hours)
- Premio Lope de Vega in 1950 for his drama Condenados (the condemned).

== Filmography (as screenwriter) ==
- Proceso à la conciencia (1964)
- A las diez y media (1962) (was based on his novel Las últimas horas)
- Llovidos del cielo (1962)
- Juicio final (1960)
- Fulano y Mengano (1959)
- Juanillo, papá y mamá (1957)
- Condenados (1953)
- Cabaret (1953)

(All films listed here were based on his novels, with the exception of Condenados, which was a play)

== See also ==
- Café Gijón (Madrid)
