= Carlos Lemos (actor) =

Spanish actor

- Born: 11 June 1909; Ciudad Real, Spain
- Died: 22 February 1988 (aged 78); Madrid, Spain
- Occupation: Actor
- Years active: 1953-1987

Carlos Lemos (11 June 1909 - 22 February 1988) was a Spanish theatre and film actor. He appeared in more than thirty films from 1953 to 1987.

== Selected filmography ==
Year	Title	Role	Notes
1953	Condemned	Jose	
1965	The Sweet Sound of Death		
1974	The Ghost Galleon		
1986	Voyage to Nowhere	Daniel Otero	
