= Osvaldo Martínez =

Paraguayan footballer (born 1986)

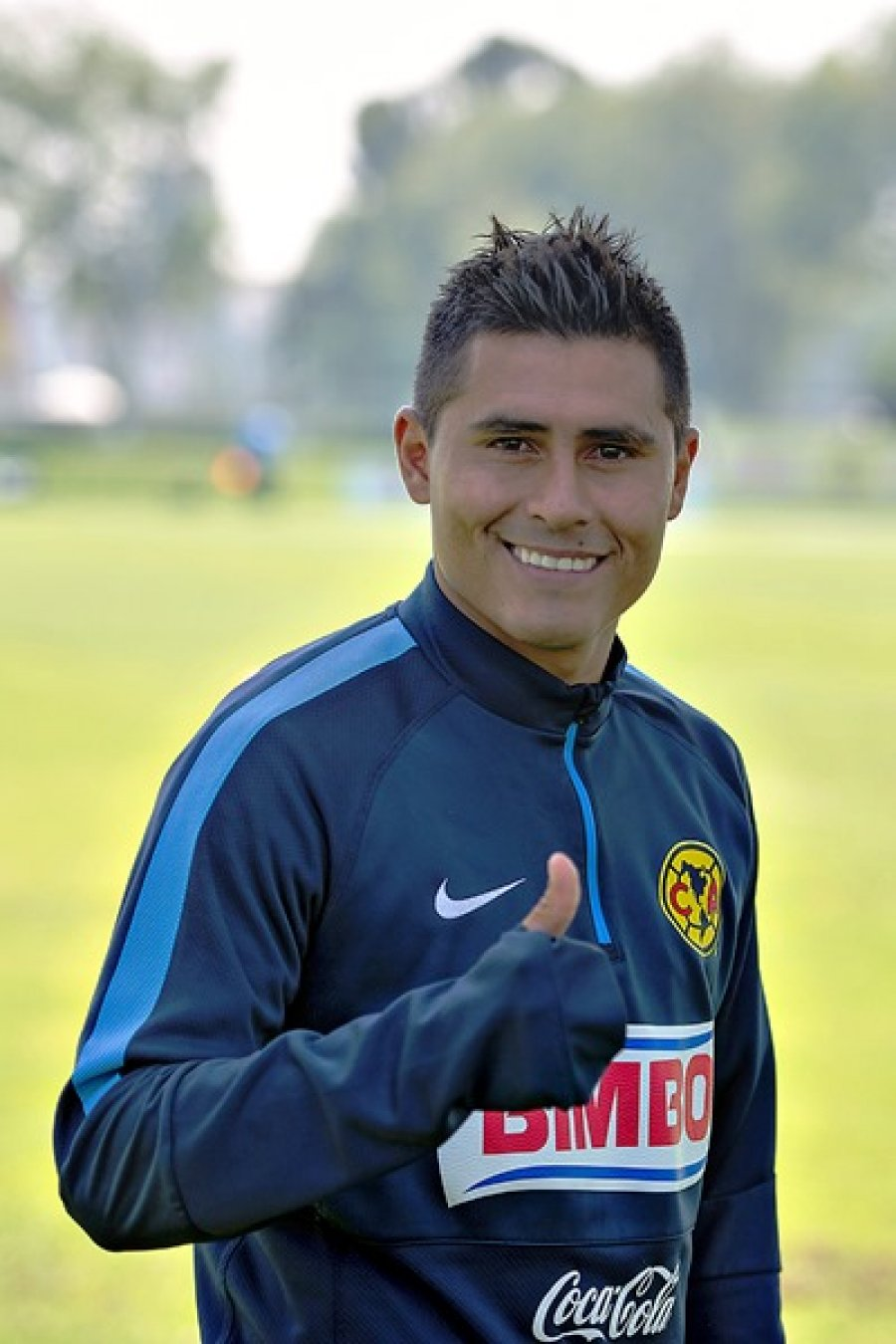
- Martínez training with América in 2016

Personal information
- Full name: Osvaldo David Martínez Arce
- Date of birth: 8 April 1986 (age 40)
- Place of birth: Luque, Paraguay
- Height: 1.66 m (5 ft 5 in)
- Position: Midfielder

Senior career*
Years	Team	Apps	(Gls)
2003–2008	Libertad	155	(35)
2008–2011	Monterrey	94	(13)
2011–2012	Atlante	49	(15)
2013–2016	América	153	(15)
2017–2018	Santos Laguna	73	(8)
2018–2019	Atlas	35	(6)
2020	Puebla	25	(4)
2021	Sol de América	9	(2)
2021	Querétaro	7	(0)
2022	General Caballero JLM	9	(0)

International career
2008–2016	Paraguay	32	(1)
Medal record
Representing Paraguay
Copa América
Runner-up	2011 Argentina	Team
- * Club domestic league appearances and goals as of 12 September 2021

Osvaldo David Martínez Arce (born 8 April 1986) is a former Paraguayan professional footballer who played as a midfielder. He is a naturalized Mexican citizen.

== Career ==
=== Club Libertad ===
Osvaldo Martínez began his career with Club Libertad in 2003, playing in over 150 matches and winning four league titles before transferring to Mexican club Monterrey.

=== Monterrey C.F. ===
Osvaldo made the move to Monterrey in 2008 for a fee of about £2 million. He made an immediate impact with his new club, scoring in the first minute of his first match in the league, a 4–0 victory over Puebla. While at Monterrey, Martínez would play in over 100 matches, winning two league titles, an Interliga in 2010, and a CONCACAF Champions League trophy in 2011.

=== Atlante ===
Osvaldo transferred again, this time to Atlante in July 2011. He made his league debut for the club on 30 July 2011 in a 3–0 loss to Santos Laguna, coming on for Diego Ordaz in the 59th minute. He scored his first league goal for the club on 27 August 2011 in a 2–1 win against Tecos F.C. The goal, scored in the 52nd minute, came from the penalty spot. His first season with Atlante was the most prolific of his career, scoring 12 goals over 33 league matches.

=== Club America ===
In January 2013, it was announced that Martínez was sold to Club América. In his first tournament América won the league title, defeating Cruz Azul on penalties, with Martínez scoring the third goal for América. He would win another league title the following year, as well as another CONCACAF Champions League in 2015.

=== Santos Laguna ===
In January 2017, Martinez was included in part of a swap deal between America and Santos Laguna. He made his league debut for Santos Laguna on 7 January 2017 in a 0–0 draw with Tigres UANL, coming on for Djaniny in the 71st minute. His first league goal for the club came on 26 February 2017 in a 2–2 draw with Necaxa. The goal, assisted by Djaniny, came in the 26th minute and was the first of the game.

== International career ==
Martínez has been capped 32 times for the Paraguay national team, scoring one goal. He made his debut on 15 October 2008, in a FIFA World Cup 2010 qualifying match in Asunción against Peru. In 2015 Martínez announced his retirement from the national team, yet he came out of international retirement and played with Paraguay in the 2018 World Cup Qualifiers in March 2016.

== Personal life ==
Osvaldo is married to Giselle Martínez, with whom he has one child.

== Career statistics ==
=== International goals ===
No.	Date	Venue	Opponent	Score	Result	Competition	Ref.
1.	12 October 2010	Westpac Stadium, Wellington, New Zealand	New Zealand	0–2	0–2	Friendly	

== Honours ==
Libertad

- Primera División: Apertura 2006, Clausura 2007, Apertura 2008, Clausura 2008

Monterrey

- Mexican Primera División: Apertura 2009, Apertura 2010
- CONCACAF Champions League: 2010–11
- InterLiga: 2010

América

- Liga MX: Clausura 2013, Apertura 2014
- CONCACAF Champions League: 2014–15, 2015–16

Santos Laguna

- Liga MX: Clausura 2018
