= La llamada (1965 film) =

La Llamada
- Directed by: Xavier Seto
- Produced by: Sidney W. Pink
- Starring: Emilio Gutiérrez Caba; Carlos Lemos; Paco Morán
- Release date: 1965
- Running time: 88 minute
- Countries: USA; Spain
- Language: English

La Llamada (The Sweet Sound of Death in English) is a 1965 Spanish film.

== Cast ==
- Emilio Gutiérrez Caba as Pablo
- Carlos Lemos as Professor Urrutia
- Paco Morán as Jacques Monceau
- Tota Alba as Sra. Monceau
- Sun De Sanders as Claudia Legrand
- Dyanik Zurakowska as Dominique
- Daniel Blum
- Víctor Israel as Vigilante
- George Alsin
- Ana Godoy
- Joseph Shelly
- Joe Gordon as Niño
- Angie Gordon as Niña

== Reception ==
On reviewer said the film "is devoid of overt shocks, but is long on atmosphere and tension that slowly builds to a fittingly eerie climax."
