= Severo Meza =

Mexican footballer (born 1986)

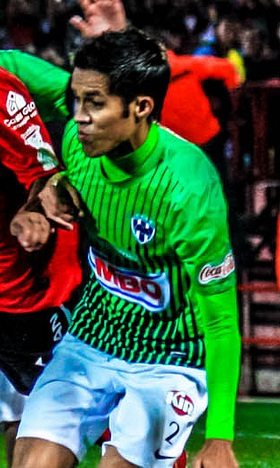
- Meza playing for Monterrey in 2012

Personal information
- Full name: Severo Efraín Meza Mayorga
- Date of birth: 9 July 1986 (age 40)
- Place of birth: Cd. Naranjos, Veracruz, Mexico
- Height: 1.73 m (5 ft 8 in)
- Position: Defender

Youth career
- Monterrey

Senior career*
Years	Team	Apps	(Gls)
2005–2017	Monterrey	296	(2)
2005–2009	Monterrey 1a. A	17	(0)
2016	→ Sinaloa (loan)	11	(0)
2016–2017	→ Necaxa (loan)	15	(0)
2017	→ Tapachula (loan)	2	(0)
Total		341	(2)

International career
2012–2013	Mexico	16	(0)

Managerial career
- 2020–2021: FCD Santiago Nuevo León
- 2022–2023: Raya2 (Assistant)
- 2024: Raniza FC (AKL)
- 2025: Mexico (KWCN)
- 2025: Persas FC (AKL)
- 2026: Monterrey (assistant)
- * Club domestic league appearances and goals

Severo Efraín Meza Mayorga (Note: In this Spanish name, the first or paternal surname is Meza and the second or maternal family name is Mayorga.) (born 9 July 1986) is a Mexican former professional footballer who played as a defender.

He gave an assist for the winning goal to Guillermo Franco and thus winning the semi-final and Clásico Regiomontano against Tigres UANL during the Apertura 2005 tournament.

Meza was assaulted during a robbery at his home in February 2012.

== Honours ==
Monterrey

- Mexican Primera División: Apertura 2009, Apertura 2010
- CONCACAF Champions League: 2010-11, 2011–12, 2012–13
- InterLiga: 2010
