= Jonathan Orozco =

Mexican footballer (born 1986)

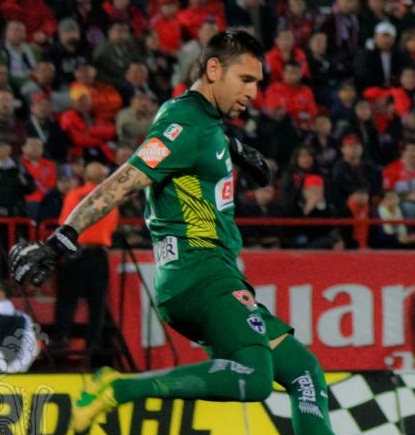
- Orozco with Monterrey in 2012

Personal information
- Full name: Jonathan Emmanuel Orozco Domínguez
- Date of birth: 12 May 1986 (age 40)
- Place of birth: Monterrey, Nuevo León, Mexico
- Height: 1.84 m (6 ft 0 in)
- Position: Goalkeeper

Youth career
- 1996–2004: Monterrey

Senior career*
| Years | Team | Apps | (Gls) |
| 2004–2016 | Monterrey | 319 | (0) |
| 2005 | → Cobras (loan) | 11 | (0) |
| 2005–2009 | Monterrey 1a. A | 12 | (0) |
| 2017–2020 | Santos Laguna | 114 | (0) |
| 2020–2023 | Tijuana | 76 | (0) |

International career
| 2008 | Mexico U23 | 2 | (0) |
| 2010–2021 | Mexico | 9 | (0) |
Medal record
Men's football
Representing Mexico
CONCACAF Gold Cup
| Winner | 2011 United States |
| Winner | 2015 United States |
| Winner | 2019 United States |
| Runner-up | 2021 United States |
- * Club domestic league appearances and goals

Jonathan Emmanuel Orozco Domínguez (born 12 May 1986) is a Mexican former professional footballer who played as a goalkeeper.

Orozco began his career with Monterrey making his debut in the Apertura 2005 tournament and became the starting goalkeeper in 2008, winning two league titles and three CONCACAF Champions League tournaments before transferring to Santos Laguna in 2016, helping them win the Clausura 2018 league title. In 2020 he was transferred to Tijuana.

Orozco made his international debut for Mexico on February 24, 2010, in a friendly against Bolivia. He was the starting goalkeeper in the 2013 CONCACAF Gold Cup and as a backup he won the 2011, 2015 and 2019 editions of the tournament.

== Club career ==
Born in Monterrey, Nuevo León, Orozco began his career in 2005 with Cobras de Ciudad Juárez who at the time were the filial team for Monterrey. After playing part of the Apertura 2005 tournament with C.F. Monterrey 1a A, he was called up to the first team. He made his professional debut on August 13, 2005, a 1–0 win over Atlas, earning a clean sheet in his first career start. Jonathan Orozco was also part of the squad that won the Apertura 2009 with Monterrey.

Orozco won his second championship with Monterrey in the Apertura 2010. He played the finale with Santos Laguna, winning 3-0 (5-3 aggregate) and giving Monterrey their fourth FMF championship.

In January 2017, he moved to Santos Laguna on a free transfer, where he won the Clausura 2018.

On 21 May 2020, Orozco tested positive for COVID-19 during the pandemic, but later recovered and transferred to Club Tijuana the next month.

== International career ==
Orozco was first called up to the senior national team on February 18, 2010. He played all 90 minutes against Bolivia and earned a clean sheet. He was on the Mexico roster for the 2011 Gold Cup, the 2013 Gold Cup, the 2015 Gold Cup, the 2015 CONCACAF Cup, and the 2019 Gold Cup.

== Career statistics ==
=== International ===
As of match played 28 October 2021

| National team | Year | Apps | Goals |
|---|---|---|---|
| Mexico | 2010 | 1 | 0 |
| Mexico | 2012 | 1 | 0 |
| Mexico | 2013 | 4 | 0 |
| Mexico | 2019 | 2 (Note: Jonathan Orozco additionally played a match against Martinique in 2019, which is not recognized by FIFA.) | 0 |
| Mexico | 2021 | 1 | 0 |
| Total | | 9 | 0 |

== Honours ==
Monterrey

- Mexican Primera División: Apertura 2009, Apertura 2010
- InterLiga: 2010
- CONCACAF Champions League: 2010–11, 2011–12, 2012–13

Santos Laguna

- Liga MX: Clausura 2018

Mexico

- CONCACAF Gold Cup: 2011, 2015, 2019
- CONCACAF Cup: 2015

Individual

- Mexican Primera División Balón de Oro Goalkeeper of the tournament: Apertura 2009, Clausura 2011
