= Óscar Recio =

Mexican footballer (born 1989)

Personal information
- Full name: José Óscar Recio Arreola
- Date of birth: June 23, 1989 (age 37)
- Place of birth: Monterrey, Mexico
- Height: 5 ft 9 in (1.75 m)
- Position: Defender

Youth career
- 2007–2008: Monterrey

Senior career*
Years	Team	Apps	(Gls)
2008–2013	Monterrey	6	(0)
2010–2011	→ Atlante (loan)	3	(0)
2011	→ Mérida (loan)	10	(0)
2011–2012	→ Indios (loan)	3	(0)
2012	→ Houston Dynamo (loan)	0	(0)

International career
	Mexico U-23	4	(0)
- * Club domestic league appearances and goals as of April 19, 2012

José Óscar Recio Arreola (born June 23, 1989) is a Mexican footballer.

== Club career ==
On April 13, 2012, Recio signed a loan deal with the Houston Dynamo of Major League Soccer.
