= Aldo de Nigris =

Mexican footballer (born 1983)

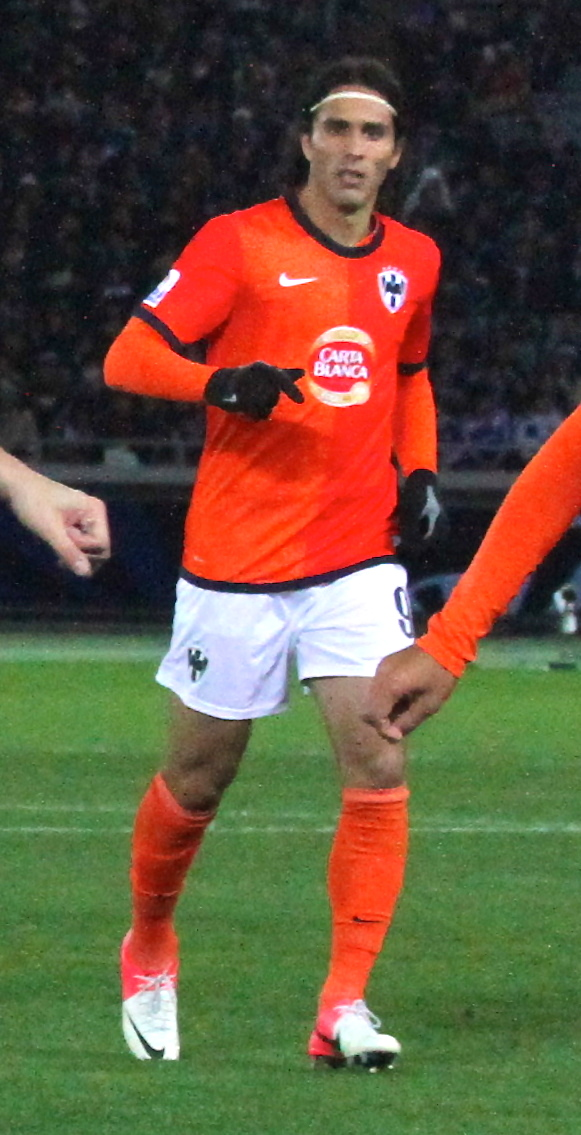
- De Nigris playing for Monterrey

Personal information
- Full name: Jesús Aldo de Nigris Guajardo
- Date of birth: 22 July 1983 (age 43)
- Place of birth: Monterrey, Nuevo León
- Height: 1.84 m (6 ft 0 in)
- Position: Forward

Youth career
- 2000: Monterrey
- 2000: Gavilanes
- 2001–2002: Tigres UANL

Senior career*
Years	Team	Apps	(Gls)
2002–2007	Tigres UANL	86	(9)
2007–2008	Veracruz	28	(7)
2008–2010	Necaxa	8	(0)
2009	→ Monterrey (loan)	38	(16)
2010–2013	Monterrey	103	(37)
2013–2015	Guadalajara	51	(7)
2015–2017	Monterrey	38	(6)
Total		353	(82)

International career
2003	Mexico U20	3	(1)
2010–2014	Mexico	28	(9)

Managerial career
- 2019–2021: Monterrey (assistant)
- 2021–2022: Raya2
- 2022–2023: Monterrey (assistant)
Medal record
Representing Mexico
CONCACAF Gold Cup
Winner	CONCACAF Gold Cup	2011
- * Club domestic league appearances and goals

Jesus Aldo de Nigris Guajardo (born 22 July 1983) is a Mexican former professional footballer who played as a forward.

== Club career ==
De Nigris started his career at the youth divisions of Tigres UANL, the biggest rival of CF Monterrey. Tigres debuted him in Liga MX. He played some irregular seasons with Tigres, Veracruz and Necaxa until he arrived at Monterrey. In the first game after his brother's death, he dedicated his only goal to him in an Apertura 2009 playoff game against América on 21 November 2009 in the second minute of the second half. He then scored two goals against Toluca in the semi-final. He also scored in the final against Cruz Azul, giving Monterrey the lead, and eventually dedicating the winning championship to his late brother.

A year later, de Nigris won his second league title with Monterrey, this time against Santos Laguna. On 27 April 2011, Monterrey won the CONCACAF Champions League, where they defeated MLS club Real Salt Lake in the final. De Nigris was their top goal scorer, with four, tied with teammate Humberto Suazo

=== C.D. Guadalajara ===
On 1 July 2013, de Nigris signed with C.D. Guadalajara for 5 million dollars until 30 June 2016. He made his debut with the club on 18 August 2013 in a home match against Puebla F.C.

=== Return to C.F. Monterrey 2015 ===
On 10 June 2015, de Nigris returned to Rayados. Yet the exact amount of the transaction is not known. He retired in 2017.

== International career ==
De Nigris was called up to the Mexico national football team for the friendly matches against Bolivia on 24 February 2010 and New Zealand on 3 March 2010. Mexico defeated Bolivia 5–0, in which de Nigris entered the game as a substitute. He started in his first game for Mexico against New Zealand, in which he played the first forty-five minutes, until being taken off at half-time. Mexico would win 2–0. He was left out of Javier Aguirre's 23-man squad for the 2010 FIFA World Cup due to an ankle injury, in which he took 12 weeks to recover.

On 29 March 2011, he scored his first international goal in a friendly match against Venezuela.

=== 2011 CONCACAF Gold Cup ===
De Nigris was named in the 23-man squad to participate in the CONCACAF Gold Cup. On 5 June he scored the second goal in the 5–0 over El Salvador after coming on as a substitute in the second-half. On 9 June de Nigris again scored after coming off the bench in a 5–0 win over Cuba. Three days later, he would score again coming on in the second half in the quarter-final match against Guatemala. After Mexico and Honduras held each other to a 0–0 draw in the semi-final match, de Nigris opened the score in the first half of extra-time, heading in a corner kick. Mexico would win the match 2–0, thus advancing to the final.

== Personal life ==
Aldo is the youngest of three brothers. They grew up on the south side of Monterrey. His oldest brother, "Poncho" de Nigris, is a TV host and influencer. His other brother, the late Antonio "Toño" de Nigris, was also a footballer who played for CF Monterrey and the Mexico national team as well. On 15 November 2009, Antonio died from a heart attack at the age of 31 in Greece while playing for AEL. His family is Italian on his father's side.

== Career statistics ==
=== International ===
Appearances and goals by national team and year
National team	Year	Apps	Goals
Mexico	2010	2	0
Mexico	2011	12	6
Mexico	2012	6	2
Mexico	2013	7	1
Mexico	2014	1	0
Total		28	9

Scores and results list Mexico's goal tally first, score column indicates score after each de Nigris goal.

List of international goals scored by Aldo de Nigris
No.	Date	Venue	Opponent	Score	Result	Competition
1	29 March 2011	Qualcomm Stadium, San Diego, United States	Venezuela	1–0	1–1	Friendly
2	1 June 2011	Invesco Field at Mile High, Denver, United States	New Zealand	3–0	3–0	Friendly
3	5 June 2011	Cowboys Stadium, Arlington, United States	El Salvador	2–0	5–0	2011 CONCACAF Gold Cup
4	9 June 2011	Bank of America Stadium, Charlotte, United States	Cuba	3–0	5–0	2011 CONCACAF Gold Cup
5	18 June 2011	New Meadowlands Stadium, East Rutherford, United States	Guatemala	1–1	2–1	2011 CONCACAF Gold Cup
6	22 June 2011	Reliant Stadium, Houston, United States	Honduras	1–0	2–0	2011 CONCACAF Gold Cup
7	27 May 2012	MetLife Stadium, East Rutherford, United States	Wales	1–0	2–0	Friendly
8	27 May 2012	MetLife Stadium, East Rutherford, United States	Wales	2–0	2–0	Friendly
9	4 June 2013	Independence Park, Kingston, Jamaica	Jamaica	1–0	1–0	2014 FIFA World Cup qualification

== Honours ==
Tigres UANL

- InterLiga: 2005, 2006.

Monterrey

- Primera División de México: Apertura 2009, Apertura 2010
- InterLiga: 2010
- CONCACAF Champions League: 2010–11, 2011–12, 2012–13

Mexico

- CONCACAF Gold Cup: 2011

Individual

- CONCACAF Champions League Golden Ball: 2012–13
- Copa MX Golden Boot: Clausura 2015
