= Víctor Manuel Vucetich =

Mexican footballer and manager (born 1955)

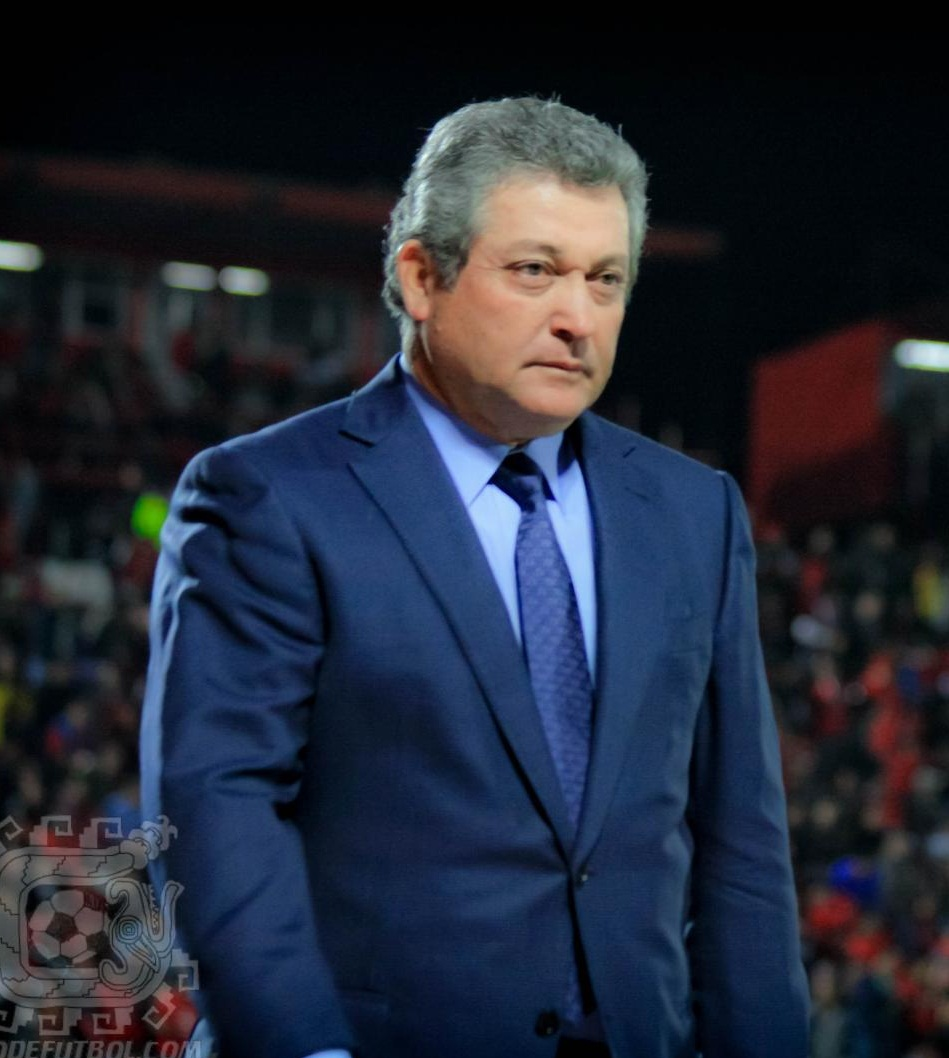
- Vucetich as Monterrey manager in 2012

Personal information
- Full name: Víctor Manuel Vucetich Rojas
- Date of birth: 25 June 1955 (age 71)
- Place of birth: Tampico, Tamaulipas, Mexico
- Height: 1.78 m (5 ft 10 in)
- Position: Defensive midfielder

Team information
- Current team: Tigres UANL (interim head coach)

Youth career
- Universidad Nacional

Senior career*
Years	Team	Apps	(Gls)
1978–1981	Atlante	76	(0)
1981–1983	Oaxtepec	32	(1)
Total		108	(1)

Managerial career
- 1988–1989: Potros Neza
- 1990–1993: León
- 1993–1995: Tecos
- 1995–1996: Tigres UANL
- 1996–1997: Cruz Azul
- 1997–1998: Tecos
- 1999: León
- 1999–2000: Tigres UANL
- 2001–2002: La Piedad
- 2002–2003: Puebla
- 2003–2004: Pachuca
- 2005–2006: Veracruz
- 2007: Chiapas
- 2009–2013: Monterrey
- 2013: Mexico
- 2015–2017: Querétaro
- 2019–2020: Querétaro
- 2020–2021: Guadalajara
- 2022–2023: Monterrey
- 2024–2025: Mazatlán
- 2026–: Tigres UANL (interim)
- * Club domestic league appearances and goals

Víctor Manuel Vucetich Rojas (born 25 June 1955) is a Mexican professional football manager and player. He is the sporting director and interim head coach of Tigres UANL.

With a managerial career that stretches over three decades, Vucetich stands among the most accomplished figures in Mexican football. Over the years, he led fourteen different Mexican clubs, capturing five Primera División championships with four of them. In total, he oversaw over 900 matches in the top division, ranking third all-time for the most games managed in the league's history.

Born in Tampico, Tamaulipas, he is the son of José Antonio Vucetich Adler, an Argentine of Hungarian and Croatian descent who was born in Buenos Aires. Because of his many achievements with multiple clubs, he is popularly nicknamed by the Mexican press, players and fans as El Rey Midas (King Midas) because "everything he touches turns to gold".

== Career ==
=== Early Managerial Success and Rise to Prominence (1988–1994) ===
Vucetich began his managerial career in Mexico's Segunda División with Potros Neza, where he achieved promotion to the Primera División during the 1988–89 season. Following this success, the club was sold and relocated, leaving Vucetich without a managerial position.

He subsequently returned to the Segunda División to take charge of León, which had recently been relegated. In the 1989–90 season, he led León back to the Primera División. In his first top-flight campaign, Vucetich produced encouraging results, and in the following tournament, he secured his first league championship as a manager when León triumphed over Puebla in the final.

During the 1993–94 season, Vucetich was appointed head coach of Tecos UAG. Remarkably, in his first season with the club, he guided them to the league championship title.

=== Challenges and Continued Achievements (1995–2008) ===
Vucetich arrived at Tigres UANL for the 1995–96 season with a clear mandate: keep the club in Mexico's top flight. His tenure produced a Copa México triumph, yet the achievement was overshadowed by relegation at the season's end. He moved on to Cruz Azul the following campaign, where he once again delivered Copa México glory.

The next six years saw Vucetich rotate through second stints at Tecos, León, and Tigres, while also taking the reins at La Piedad and Puebla. Results across this stretch were inconsistent.

His fortunes shifted sharply when he took charge of Pachuca during the Apertura 2003, winning the league title in his very first tournament with the club. After leaving Pachuca, he stepped away from management briefly before returning with Veracruz and then Chiapas — though neither spell recaptured his earlier success.

=== Monterrey Glory, National Team, and Final Years (2009–present) ===
In the Clausura 2009, Vucetich was appointed head coach of Monterrey. His tenure began strongly, with the team reaching the quarterfinals, and in the subsequent Apertura 2009, Monterrey captured the league title by defeating Cruz Azul in the final.

In the Apertura 2010, Vucetich guided Monterrey to another league championship, overcoming Santos Laguna in the final—his fifth and final domestic league title. In the following tournament, he achieved his first international success, winning the CONCACAF Champions League, a feat he repeated in the two subsequent editions.

In September 2013, Vucetich was appointed manager of the Mexico national team. However, after recording one victory and one defeat, he was relieved of his duties the following month.

In the final stage of his career, Vucetich took charge of Querétaro, guiding the team to a Copa México title. He later managed Guadalajara, returned to Monterrey for a second spell, and oversaw Mazatlán, though he was unable to reproduce the remarkable achievements that had once established him as one of the most successful coaches in Mexican football history. In July 2025, he officially announced his retirement. Just a year later, on August 20, 2026, Tigres UANL appointed him sporting director, and he stepped in as interim head coach to guide the squad.

== Managerial statistics ==
As of match played 21 November 2026

Managerial record by team and tenure
Team	Nat	From	To	Record							
Team	Nat	From	To	G	W	D	L	GF	GA	GD	Win %
Neza	(Mexico)	1988	1989	47	22	14	11	66	45	+21	46.81
León	(Mexico)	25 September 1990	30 June 1993	185	80	58	47	270	184	+86	43.24
Tecos	(Mexico)	1 July 1993	30 June 1995	88	39	32	17	121	86	+35	44.32
Tigres UANL	(Mexico)	1 July 1995	30 June 1996	45	17	16	12	57	51	+6	37.78
Cruz Azul	(Mexico)	1 July 1996	9 March 1997	37	15	9	13	60	49	+11	40.54
Tecos	(Mexico)	1 July 1997	17 August 1998	41	14	11	16	53	62	−9	34.15
León	(Mexico)	1 January 1999	30 June 1999	17	5	1	11	19	33	−14	29.41
Tigres UANL	(Mexico)	17 September 1999	30 June 2000	29	9	12	8	46	36	+10	31.03
La Piedad	(Mexico)	5 October 2001	30 June 2002	29	15	3	11	48	37	+11	51.72
Puebla	(Mexico)	16 September 2002	3 March 2003	19	6	2	11	21	33	−12	31.58
Pachuca	(Mexico)	1 July 2003	30 June 2004	46	20	15	11	71	60	+11	43.48
Veracruz	(Mexico)	4 March 2005	30 June 2005	10	2	4	4	11	17	−6	20.00
Veracruz	(Mexico)	3 March 2006	3 September 2006	16	6	5	5	17	20	−3	37.50
Chiapas	(Mexico)	15 February 2007	7 September 2007	19	5	6	8	18	31	−13	26.32
Monterrey	(Mexico)	9 January 2009	26 August 2013	244	114	71	59	394	273	+121	46.72
Mexico	(Mexico)	12 September 2013	18 October 2013	2	1	0	1	3	3	+0	50.00
Querétaro	(Mexico)	24 February 2015	31 January 2017	91	35	24	32	130	116	+14	38.46
Querétaro	(Mexico)	18 February 2019	2 June 2020	47	19	9	19	64	65	−1	40.43
Guadalajara	(Mexico)	13 August 2020	19 September 2021	45	17	17	11	54	50	+4	37.78
Monterrey	(Mexico)	2 March 2022	28 May 2023	54	31	12	11	89	49	+40	57.41
Mazatlán	(Mexico)	7 May 2024	13 May 2025	39	8	15	16	33	50	−17	20.51
Tigres UANL	(Mexico)	20 August 2026	present	13	4	5	4	12	15	−3	30.77
Total				1,163	484	341	338	1,654	1,362	+292	41.62

== Honours ==
=== Manager ===
Potros Neza

- Segunda División: 1988–89

León

- Primera División: 1991–92
- Segunda División: 1989–90

Tecos

- Primera División: 1993–94

Tigres UANL

- Copa México: 1995–96

Cruz Azul

- Copa México: 1996–97

Pachuca

- Primera División: Apertura 2003

Monterrey

- Primera División: Apertura 2009, Apertura 2010
- InterLiga: 2010
- CONCACAF Champions League: 2010–11, 2011–12, 2012–13
- FIFA Club World Cup: Third place 2012

Querétaro

- Copa MX: Apertura 2016

Individual

- Mexican Primera División Manager of the tournament: 1991–92, 1993–94, Apertura 2009, Apertura 2010

== See also ==
- List of football managers with the most matches
