= Víctor A. Carreño =

Dominican Republic scientist (born 1956)

- Born: 1956 (age 69–70); Santo Domingo, Dominican Republic
- Occupations: Aerospace Engineer and Aerospace Technologist

Notes
- Carreño holds the patent for the Single Frequency Multitransmitter Telemetry System

Víctor A. Carreño (born 1956) is a NASA aerospace engineer and aerospace technologist. He holds the patent for the Single Frequency Multitransmitter Telemetry System.

== Early years ==
Carreño was born in Santo Domingo, Dominican Republic. His family moved to Puerto Rico when he was only a child and he was raised in the City of Guaynabo. Carreño became interested in electronics and the solution of mathematical problems as a child. After finishing his primary and secondary education, he attended the Margarita Janer Palacios High School and here he was a top mathematics and science student and graduated with honors in 1974.

In 1974, Carreño enrolled at the University of Puerto Rico and earned his Bachelor of Science degree in electrical engineering in 1979. Upon graduation, he applied to and was hired by the NASA Langley Research Center and assigned to the Aircraft Electronics System Branch, Flight Electronics Division. In 1983, he was reassigned to the digital system upset assessment team, in the Fault Tolerant Systems Branch. His work involved the development of techniques for analytically assessing digital system upset due to lightning-induced transients.

== Career in NASA ==
Carreño is credited with inventing and developing the Single Frequency Multitransmitter Telemetry System in 1983. He also designed and conducted experiments for the real-time evaluation of the Viper single board computer while working in the instrumentation of the F-106 lightning research aircraft. Carreño continued his higher education by enrolling at the Old Dominian University, where in 1985 he obtained his master's degree in electrical engineering. In 1986 he was granted the patent for the SFMTS, U.S. Patent # 4,631,538.

In 1990, Carreño was assigned to the formal methods team, Assessment Technology Branch. This team worked on the development of mathematical techniques for the verification of critical systems. In 1994, he enrolled in the University of Cambridge in England and graduated with a PhD in computer science in 1997. Carreño worked in the verification of air traffic management concepts and the development of mathematical infrastructure to support such verifications. On March 30, 2007, Carreño retired from NASA.

== Awards ==
Among his many awards and recognitions are:

- 1986-Certificate of Appreciation (La RC),
- 1983-Certificate of Recognition (NASA Invention Disclosures) and Certificate of Recognition (NASA Tech Brief Publication),
- 1986,89-Certificate of Appreciation (The Governor's Magnet School),
- 1995-Superior Accomplishment Award and 1996-Group Achievement Award.
