= Darío Carreño =

Mexican footballer (born 1988)

Personal information
- Full name: Abraham Darío Carreño Rohan
- Date of birth: 13 January 1988 (age 38)
- Place of birth: Monterrey, Nuevo León, Mexico
- Height: 1.83 m (6 ft 0 in)
- Position: Forward

Youth career
- Dorados Fuerza
- 1998–2005: Monterrey

Senior career*
Years	Team	Apps	(Gls)
2008–2012	Monterrey	112	(24)
2013–2014	Pachuca	37	(9)
2015	Tigres UANL	7	(0)
2015	→ Chiapas (loan)	4	(1)
2016	→ Cafetaleros (loan)	26	(6)
2017	→ Cimarrones (loan)	11	(1)
2018	Puebla	1	(0)
2018–2019	Comunicaciones	44	(16)
2019–2020	Venados	16	(1)
2021	Municipal Grecia	8	(1)
2022	Nueva Concepción	7	(1)
- * Club domestic league appearances and goals as of 10 April 2022

Abraham Darío Carreño Rohan (born 13 January 1988) is a former Mexican professional footballer who last played as a forward for Liga Nacional club Nueva Concepción.

== Club career ==
=== CF Monterrey ===
Carreño started playing professionally in C.F. Monterrey, and made his league debut in August 2008 at 20 years old, in a tie with Atlas in Guadalajara, Jalisco. He eventually became a very important player for Monterrey. He earned his nickname of "El Amuleto" (The Amulet) due to a long streak of subbing into the match and scoring important goals. He is bound to gain minutes with Monterrey and is a national team strong prospect.

In the Clausura 2009 tournament, Carreño became a regular substitute for Monterrey. He scored his first professional goal against Indios de Ciudad Juárez and finished the season with five goals.

In Apertura 2009, he scored four goals as Monterrey won its third league title. In the semifinals against Toluca, his goal made the match 1–1; Monterrey advanced 3–1 on aggregate and went on to defeat Cruz Azul in the final.

In Bicentenario 2010, Carreño was Monterrey's top scorer with seven goals and became a regular starter, replacing Chilean striker Humberto Suazo. Monterrey finished first in the regular season with 10 wins, six draws, and one loss, but was eliminated by Pachuca in the quarterfinals.

== Honours ==
Monterrey

- Mexican Primera División: Apertura 2009, Apertura 2010
- CONCACAF Champions League: 2010-11, 2011–12
- InterLiga: 2010
