= Diego Ordaz =

Mexican footballer (born 1984)

Personal information
- Full name: Diego Alejandro Ordaz Álvarez
- Date of birth: 7 May 1984 (age 42)
- Place of birth: Guadalajara, Mexico
- Height: 1.79 m (5 ft 10 in)
- Position: Defender

Team information
- Current team: Santos Laguna U-23 (Assistant)

Senior career*
Years	Team	Apps	(Gls)
2003–2012	Monterrey	185	(3)
2010	→ Jaguares (loan)	22	(0)
2011	→ Atlante (loan)	28	(0)
2012	→ San Luis (loan)	6	(0)
2013	Atlante	10	(1)
2013–2014	Lobos BUAP	12	(1)

Managerial career
- 2023–: Santos Laguna Reserves and Academy
- * Club domestic league appearances and goals as of 3 November 2013

Diego Alejandro Ordaz Álvarez (Note: In this Spanish name, the first or paternal surname is Ordaz and the second or maternal family name is Álvarez.) (born 7 May 1984) is a Mexican former footballer who played as a defender. He last played for Chiapas F.C. in the Liga MX, and before that he was with Atlante, Chiapas and San Luis.

Before his time at Jaguares, Ordaz made over 180 appearances for C.F. Monterrey, having made his debut on 16 March 2003 against Club América.
