= 2009–10 Mexican Primera División season =

Primera División de México
- Season: 2009–10
- Champions: Apertura: Monterrey (3rd title); Bicentenario: Toluca (10th title)
- Relegated: Ciudad Juárez
- Champions League: Monterrey; Toluca; Cruz Azul; Santos Laguna
- Copa Libertadores: Morelia; Monterrey; Tecos; Guadalajara; San Luis
- InterLiga: América; Monterrey; Santos Laguna; Puebla; Atlante; UANL; Estudiantes Tecos; Chiapas
- SuperLiga: Pachuca; Morelia; Puebla; UNAM
- Matches: 176
- Goals: 472 (2.68 per match)
- Top goalscorer: Apertura: Emanuel Villa (17 goals); Bicentenario: Javier Hernández; Johan Fano; Hérculez Gómez (10 goals)
- Biggest home win: América 7–2 Toluca (August 30, 2009); Morelia 5–0 Ciudad Juárez (August 16, 2009); América 5–0 Estudiantes Tecos (September 13, 2009); Morelia 5–0 Querétaro (September 27, 2009); Toluca 5–0 Estudiantes Tecos (April 4, 2010)
- Biggest away win: Atlas 1–4 Guadalajara(November 7, 2009)

The 2009–10 Primera División de México was the 63rd professional season of Mexico's top-flight football league, and 13th season in which the Apertura and Clausura system is used. The season is split into two tournaments—the Torneo Apertura and the Torneo Bicentenario—each with identical formats and each contested by the same eighteen teams.

== Clubs ==
Locations of the 2009–10 Primera División teams

Seventeen teams returned for this season. Necaxa was relegated the previous season after accumulating the lowest coefficient over the past three seasons. They were replaced by Querétaro, who was promoted from the Liga de Ascenso.

Club	Home City	Stadium	Capacity
América	Mexico City	Azteca	105,000
Atlante	Cancún	Andrés Quintana Roo	20,000
Atlas	Guadalajara	Jalisco	56,700
Chiapas	Tuxtla Gutiérrez	Víctor Manuel Reyna	31,100
Ciudad Juárez	Ciudad Juárez	Olímpico Benito Juárez	22,300
Cruz Azul	Mexico City	Estadio Azul	35,000
Estudiantes Tecos	Guadalajara	3 de Marzo	30,000
Guadalajara	Guadalajara	Jalisco	56,700
Monterrey	Monterrey	Tecnológico	38,000
Morelia	Morelia	Morelos	41,500
Pachuca	Pachuca	Hidalgo	30,000
Puebla	Puebla	Cuauhtémoc	42,650
Querétaro	Querétaro	La Corregidora	40,785
San Luis	San Luis Potosí	Alfonso Lastras Ramírez	24,000
Santos Laguna	Torreón	Nuevo Corona	30,000
Toluca	Toluca	Nemesio Díez	27,000
UANL	Monterrey	Universitario	45,000
UNAM	Mexico City	Olímpico Universitario	63,000

=== Managerial changes ===
Team	Outgoing manager	Manner of departure	Date of vacancy	Replaced by	Date of appointment	Position in table
Querétaro	(Mexico) Héctor Medrano	Resigned	Aug. 23, 2009	(Chile) Carlos Reinoso	Aug. 26, 2009	16th
Guadalajara	(Mexico) Francisco Ramírez	Sacked	Sep. 12, 2009	(Mexico) Raúl Arias	Sep. 15, 2009	15th
Ciudad Juárez	(Uruguay) Héctor Hugo Eugui	Sacked	Sep. 28, 2009	(Mexico) José Treviño	Oct. 11, 2009	17th
San Luis	(Mexico) Juan Antonio Luna	Resigned	Oct. 12, 2009	(Argentina) Miguel Ángel López		10th
Guadalajara	(Mexico) Raúl Arias	Sacked	Nov. 3, 2009	(Mexico) José Luis Real	Nov. 3, 2009	14th
Changes during the Bicentenario
Ciudad Juárez	(Mexico) José Treviño	Sacked	March 1, 2010	TBA	TBA	18th

== Torneo Apertura ==
The 2009 Torneo Apertura was the first tournament of the season. The tournament began on July 24 and ended on December 13. Defending champion UNAM failed to defend their title after missing the playoffs. On December 13, 2009, Monterrey defeated Cruz Azul 6–4 in aggregate score to win their third title. Cruz Azul forward Emanuel Villa won his first golden boot after scoring 17 goals, five more than Héctor Mancilla who won it the two previous tournaments.

=== Regular phase ===
==== League table ====
Pos	Team	Pld	W	D	L	GF	GA	GD	Pts	Qualification
1	Toluca	17	11	2	4	32	19	+13	35	
2	Cruz Azul	17	11	0	6	35	19	+16	33	
3	Morelia	17	10	3	4	31	15	+16	33	2010 Copa Libertadores Second Stage (Note: The berth to the 2010 Copa Libertadores goes to the highest placed team currently not participating in the 2009–10 CONCACAF Champions League. This excludes Toluca, Pachuca, Cruz Azul, or UNAM from qualifying to the Copa Libertadores.)
4	América	17	8	6	3	29	16	+13	30	2010 InterLiga
5	Monterrey	17	9	3	5	27	16	+11	30	2010 InterLiga
6	Santos Laguna	17	7	6	4	29	24	+5	27	2010 InterLiga
7	Puebla	17	6	8	3	19	19	0	26	2010 InterLiga
8	Pachuca	17	7	3	7	24	29	−5	24	
9	Atlante	17	7	2	8	18	23	−5	23	2010 InterLiga
10	UANL	17	5	7	5	23	18	+5	22	2010 InterLiga
11	San Luis	17	5	6	6	21	24	−3	21	
12	Estudiantes Tecos	17	5	5	7	23	29	−6	20	2010 InterLiga
13	Chiapas	17	5	4	8	17	22	−5	19	2010 InterLiga
14	Guadalajara	17	5	4	8	23	29	−6	19	
15	Atlas	17	5	3	9	14	25	−11	18	
16	Querétaro	17	5	3	9	17	29	−12	18	
17	UNAM	17	4	5	8	16	23	−7	17	
18	Ciudad Juárez	17	0	6	11	7	26	−19	6	

Updated to match(es) played on November 14, 2009. Source: FeMexFut
Rules for classification: 1st points; 2nd goal difference; 3rd goals scored; 4th head-to-head score; 5th away goals; 6th draw

==== Group standings ====
Group 1
Pos	Team	Pld	W	D	L	GF	GA	GD	Pts	Qualification
1	Toluca	17	11	2	4	32	19	+13	35	Advances to the Final Phase
2	San Luis	17	5	6	6	21	24	−3	21	Advances to the Final Phase
3	Guadalajara	17	5	4	8	23	29	−6	19	
4	Atlas	17	5	3	9	14	25	−11	18	
5	Querétaro	17	5	3	9	17	29	−12	18	
6	Ciudad Juárez	17	0	6	11	7	26	−19	6	

Group 2
Pos	Team	Pld	W	D	L	GF	GA	GD	Pts	Qualification
1	Morelia	17	10	3	4	31	15	+16	33	Advances to the Final Phase
2	América	17	8	6	3	29	16	+13	30	Advances to the Final Phase
3	Monterrey	17	9	3	5	26	16	+10	30	Advances to the Final Phase (Note: Advanced as the two best teams in general table that are not either a group winner or runner-up.)
4	Puebla	17	6	8	3	19	19	0	26	Advances to the Final Phase
5	Pachuca	17	7	3	7	24	29	−5	24	
6	Chiapas	17	5	4	8	17	22	−5	19	

Notes:

Group 3
Pos	Team	Pld	W	D	L	GF	GA	GD	Pts	Qualification
1	Cruz Azul	17	11	0	6	35	19	+16	33	Advances to the Final Phase
2	Santos Laguna	17	7	6	4	29	24	+5	27	Advances to the Final Phase
3	Atlante	17	7	2	8	18	23	−5	23	
4	UANL	17	5	7	5	23	18	+5	22	
5	Estudiantes Tecos	17	5	5	7	23	29	−6	20	
6	UNAM	17	4	5	8	16	23	−7	17	

Updated to match(es) played on November 15, 2009. Source: FeMexFut (in Spanish)
Rules for classification: 1) points; 2) goal difference; 3) number of goals scored.

=== Results ===
Home \ Away	AMÉ	ATE	ATL	CHI	CIU	CRU	EST	GUA	MON	MOR	PAC	PUE	QUE	SLU	SLA	TOL	UNL	UNM
América		1–0	2–1	1–1			5–0	1–0	1–0	1–2		0–0				7–2		
Atlante			2–0				0–0	3–1		2–1	0–2				0–1	3–2		1–0
Atlas						0–1		1–4		0–2	1–1		0–1	0–0	2–1		2–1	1–0
Chiapas		1–1	2–3				0–1			1–2		0–1			1–1	0–2		0–2
Ciudad Juárez	0–1	0–2	1–1	0–1			1–2		0–0			0–2		1–1		0–1		
Cruz Azul	2–3	3–1		0–2	2–0		3–1		2–0			4–0		4–2		1–2		
Estudiantes Tecos			1–2					1–2		0–2	2–3		2–0	1–1	2–4	2–1		3–0
Guadalajara				1–0	2–2	0–1			1–0		2–2		2–0				1–3	
Monterrey		3–0	3–0	1–2			2–2			1–1		2–1			2–1	1–0		
Morelia					5–0	0–3		3–1			2–0		5–0	2–1	1–1		2–1	0–0
Pachuca	2–1			4–0	1–0	1–3			1–3			1–2	3–1				1–1	
Puebla		1–0	1–0				1–1	2–2		2–1					3–3	0–2		1–1
Querétaro	0–0	1–2		2–2	3–1	2–1			1–3			1–1		4–0			1–0	
San Luis	1–1	2–1		0–3				4–0	0–3		3–0	0–0			4–2			1–0
Santos Laguna	1–1				1–0	3–2		1–0			4–0		2–0				2–2	1–1
Toluca			2–0					4–3		1–0	3–0		2–0	1–1	3–0		1–1	3–0
UANL	1–1	4–0		0–1	0–0	2–0	2–2		1–2			1–1		1–0				
UNAM	3–2				1–1	0–3		1–1	2–1		1–2		3–0				1–2	

Updated to match(es) played on November 9, 2009. Source: FeMexFut
Legend: Blue = home team win; Yellow = draw; Red = away team win.

=== Final phase (Liguilla) ===
Quarterfinals
1	Toluca	0	1	1
8	San Luis	1	0	1
4	América	0	1	1
5	Monterrey	1	1	2
2	Cruz Azul	4	3	7
7	Puebla	4	2	6
3	Morelia	1	3	4
6	Santos Laguna	2	0	2

Semifinals
1	Toluca	0	1	1
5	Monterrey	2	1	3
2	Cruz Azul	0	2	2
3	Morelia	0	1	1

Finals
5	Monterrey	4	2	6
2	Cruz Azul	3	1	4

- If the two teams are tied after both legs, the higher seeded team advances.
- Both finalist qualify to the 2010–11 CONCACAF Champions League. The champion qualifies directly to the Group Stage, while the runner-up qualifies to the Preliminary Round.

Champions

3rd title

=== Top goalscorers ===
Pos	Player	Club	Goals
1	(Argentina) Emanuel Villa	Cruz Azul	17
2	(Chile) Héctor Mancilla	Toluca	12
3	(Paraguay) Salvador Cabañas	América	11
3	(Mexico) Javier Hernández	Guadalajara	11
5	(Mexico) Rafael Márquez	Atlante	9
5	(Argentina) Alfredo Moreno	San Luis	9
7	(Mexico) Juan Carlos Cacho	Pachuca	7
7	(Mexico) Aldo de Nigris	Monterrey	7
7	(Colombia) Luis Gabriel Rey	Morelia	7
7	(Chile) Humberto Suazo	Monterrey	7

Updated to November 22, 2009
Source: FeMexFut

=== Awards ===
The awards for this tournament were given out in Mexico City on January 17, 2010.

Non-voting awards

- Super-leader: Toluca
- Champion: Monterrey
- Top-scorer: Emanuel Villa (Cruz Azul)
- Best physical trainer: Miguel Ángel Ramírez (Monterrey)
- Fair play: UNAM

Balón de Oro

- Best manager: Víctor Manuel Vucetich (Monterrey)
- Best goalkeeper: Jonathan Orozco (Monterrey)
- Best wingback: Rogelio Chávez (Cruz Azul)
- Best centre-back: Duilio Davino (Monterrey)
- Best defensive midfielder: Gerardo Torrado (Cruz Azul)
- Best offensive midfielder: Jaime Lozano (Cruz Azul)
- Best striker: Emanuel Villa (Cruz Azul)
- Best rookie: Raúl Nava (Toluca)
- Best player: Humberto Suazo (Monterrey)
- Best referee: Armando Archundia
- Best assistant referee: José Luis Camargo

== Torneo Bicentenario ==
The 2010 Torneo Bicentenario is the second tournament of the season. The tournament began on January 16 and ended on May 15. The tournament got its name (the Bicentennial tournament) to commemorate the bicentennial anniversary of the Mexican independence.

=== Regular phase ===
==== League table ====
Pos	Team	Pld	W	D	L	GF	GA	GD	Pts
1	Monterrey	17	10	6	1	30	15	+15	36
2	Guadalajara	17	10	2	5	28	21	+7	32
3	Toluca	17	8	6	3	27	15	+12	30
4	UNAM	17	7	7	3	20	10	+10	28
5	Santos Laguna	17	8	4	5	27	25	+2	28
6	América	17	7	4	6	29	20	+9	25
7	Morelia	17	7	4	6	22	13	+9	25
8	Pachuca	17	7	4	6	27	26	+1	25
9	Cruz Azul	17	7	4	6	20	20	0	25
10	Atlas	17	7	3	7	26	23	+3	24
11	Querétaro	17	6	3	8	13	25	−12	21
12	Chiapas	17	4	7	6	22	24	−2	19
13	Puebla	17	5	4	8	28	31	−3	19
14	Estudiantes Tecos	17	5	4	8	26	32	−6	19
15	UANL	17	5	4	8	19	26	−7	19
16	Atlante	17	4	4	9	21	29	−8	16
17	Ciudad Juárez	17	4	3	10	10	29	−19	15
18	San Luis	17	3	5	9	18	29	−11	14

Updated to match(es) played on 19 April 2010. Source: FeMexFut (in Spanish)
Rules for classification: 1st points; 2nd goal difference; 3rd goals scored; 4th head-to-head score; 5th away goals; 6th draw

==== Group standings ====
Group 1
Pos	Team	Pld	W	D	L	GF	GA	GD	Pts	Qualification
1	Guadalajara	17	10	2	5	28	21	+7	32	Advances to the Final Phase
2	Toluca	17	8	6	3	27	15	+12	30	Advances to the Final Phase
3	Atlas	17	7	3	7	26	23	+3	24	
4	Querétaro	17	6	3	8	13	25	−12	21	
5	Ciudad Juárez	17	4	3	10	10	29	−19	15	
6	San Luis	17	3	5	9	18	28	−10	14	

Group 2
Pos	Team	Pld	W	D	L	GF	GA	GD	Pts	Qualification
1	Monterrey	17	10	6	1	30	15	+15	36	Advances to the Final Phase
2	América	17	7	4	6	29	20	+9	25	Advances to the Final Phase
2	Morelia	17	7	4	6	22	13	+9	25	Advances to the Final Phase (Note: Advanced as the two best teams in general table that are not either a group winner or runner-up.)
3	Pachuca	17	7	4	6	27	26	+1	25	Advances to the Final Phase
5	Chiapas	17	4	7	6	22	24	−2	19	
6	Puebla	17	5	4	8	28	31	−3	19	

Notes:

Group 3
Pos	Team	Pld	W	D	L	GF	GA	GD	Pts	Qualification
1	UNAM	17	7	7	3	20	10	+10	28	Advances to the Final Phase
2	Santos Laguna	17	8	4	5	27	25	+2	28	Advances to the Final Phase
3	Cruz Azul	17	7	4	6	20	20	0	25	
4	Estudiantes Tecos	17	5	4	8	26	32	−6	19	
5	UANL	17	5	4	8	19	26	−7	19	
6	Atlante	17	4	4	9	21	29	−8	16	

Updated to match(es) played on April 25, 2010. Source: FeMexFut (in Spanish)
Rules for classification: 1) points; 2) goal difference; 3) number of goals scored.

=== Results ===
Home \ Away	AMÉ	ATE	ATL	CHI	CIU	CRU	EST	GUA	MON	MOR	PAC	PUE	QUE	SLU	SLA	TOL	UNL	UNM
América					1–0	2–0					2–2		6–0	5–1	1–0		2–2	0–0
Atlante	2–2			2–0	3–0	1–0			0–1			1–1	0–0	2–3			1–2	
Atlas	1–0	3–3		1–1	7–1		0–1		3–0			0–2				1–1		
Chiapas	1–3				1–0	0–1		4–0	1–1		2–2		0–1	1–1			2–2	
Ciudad Juárez						0–0		1–0		0–1	1–2		1–0		0–0		0–1	2–0
Cruz Azul			3–1					1–1		1–0	2–2		1–0		0–2		4–0	0–0
Estudiantes Tecos	1–2	3–2		3–0	4–1	2–1			3–4			2–3					0–0	
Guadalajara	1–0	2–0	0–2				3–2			0–3		3–2		2–0	6–2	3–1		0–0
Monterrey	2–1				4–0	2–0		2–1			3–0		3–0	1–1			2–1	1–0
Morelia	2–0	0–1	3–0	1–2			2–0		1–1			1–1				0–0		
Pachuca		5–1	0–2				3–0	0–1		1–0				2–0	0–3	1–1		0–3
Puebla	2–1			3–3	1–2	4–1			1–1		3–5		1–2	1–0			0–1	
Querétaro			2–1				1–0	0–2		1–1	1–0				1–1	0–1		3–2
San Luis		3–2	3–1		1–1	1–2	1–1			0–2			3–0			2–3	0–3	
Santos Laguna		4–2	1–2	0–3			3–3		1–1	3–2		2–1		2–1		1–0		
Toluca	3–1	2–0		1–1	3–0	2–3	5–0		1–1			2–1						
UANL			0–1					1–3		0–3	1–2		2–1		1–2	0–1		2–2
UNAM		1–0	2–0	2–0			1–1			2–0		4–1		0–0	1–0	0–0		

Updated to match(es) played on April 25, 2010. Source: FeMexFut (in Spanish)
Legend: Blue = home team win; Yellow = draw; Red = away team win.

=== Final phase (Liguilla) ===
Quarterfinals
1	Monterrey	0	1	1
8	Pachuca	1	2	3
3	Toluca	2	2	4
6	América	2	0	2
4	UNAM	0	1	1
5	Santos Laguna	2	0	2
2	Guadalajara	2	0	2
7	Morelia	4	1	5

Semifinals
3	Toluca	2	1	3
8	Pachuca	2	0	2
5	Santos Laguna	3	7	10
7	Morelia	3	1	4

Final
3	Toluca	2	0	2 (4)
5	Santos Laguna	2	0	2 (3)

Champions

10th title

Notes

- If the two teams are tied after both legs, the higher seeded team advances.
- Both finalist qualify to the 2010–11 CONCACAF Champions League. The champion qualifies directly to the Group Stage, while the runner-up qualifies to the Preliminary Round.

=== Top goalscorers ===
Pos	Player	Club	Goals
1	(Mexico) Javier Hernández	Guadalajara	10
1	(Peru) Johan Fano	Atlante	10
1	(United States) Herculez Gomez	Puebla	10
4	(Colombia) Jackson Martínez	Jaguares	9
5	(Chile) Héctor Mancilla	Toluca	8
6	(Mexico) Miguel Sabah	Morelia	7
6	(Mexico) Ángel Reyna	America	7
6	(Mexico) Abraham Darío Carreño	Monterrey	7
6	(Mexico) Miguel Zepeda	Atlas	7
6	(Paraguay) Fredy Bareiro	Estudiantes Tecos	7

Updated to April 25, 2010
Source: FeMexFut

== Relegation ==
Pos	Team	'07 A Pts	'08 C Pts	'08 A Pts	'09 C Pts	'09 A Pts	'10 C Pts	Total Pts	Total Pld	Avg
1	Toluca	34	27	27	36	35	30	189	102	1.8529
2	Santos Laguna	38	31	22	22	27	28	168	102	1.6471
3	Guadalajara	31	33	25	21	19	32	161	102	1.5842
4	Cruz Azul	25	31	26	13	33	25	153	102	1.5
5	Pachuca	24	22	21	36	24	25	152	102	1.4902
6	Monterrey	14	24	19	26	30	36	149	102	1.4608
7	Morelia	22	18	24	22	33	25	144	102	1.4118
8	UNAM	24	20	26	28	17	28	143	102	1.402
9	San Luis	29	30	29	17	21	14	140	102	1.3725
10	América	26	11	21	23	30	25	136	102	1.3333
11	Atlante	33	17	27	17	23	16	133	102	1.3039
12	Puebla	17	21	15	26	26	19	124	102	1.2157
13	Estudiantes Tecos	17	17	25	25	20	19	123	102	1.2059
14	Chiapas	18	26	18	21	19	19	121	102	1.1863
15	Atlas	12	23	22	21	18	24	120	102	1.1765
16	Querétaro	0	0	0	0	18	21	39	34	1.1471
17	UANL	16	19	26	14	22	19	116	102	1.1373
18	Ciudad Juárez (R)	0	0	19	23	6	15	63	68	0.9265

Updated as of games played on April 25, 2010.
Source: FeMexFut (in Spanish)

Relegated to the Liga de Ascenso
