= Estadio Tecnológico =

Former stadium in Monterrey, Nuevo León, Mexico

- El Tec
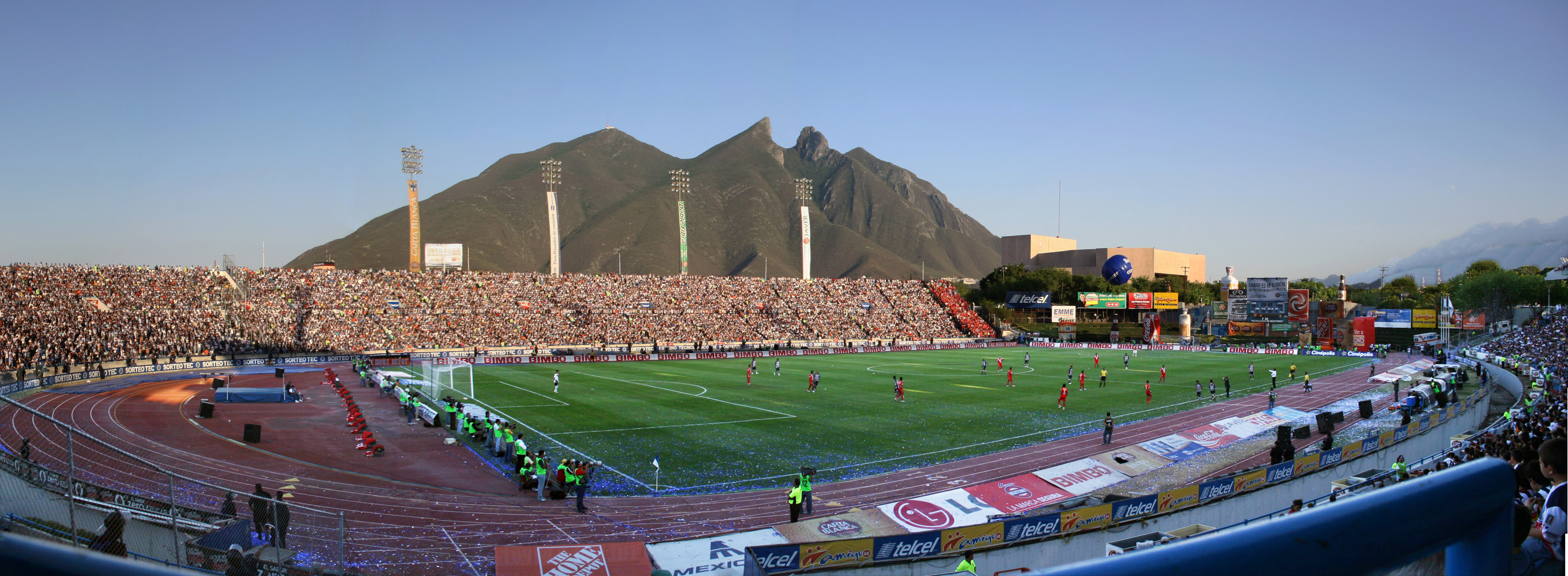
- The stadium during a Monterrey match in 2008. The Cerro de la Silla mountain range is seen in the background.
- Interactive map of Estadio Tecnológico
- Location: Junco de la Vega, Tecnológico, Monterrey, Mexico
- Coordinates: 25.6522°N 100.2864°W
- Elevation: 544 m (1,785 ft) AMSL
- Owner: Monterrey Institute of Technology and Higher Education
- Capacity: 36,485
- Surface: Grass
- Field size: 105 m × 68 m (115 yd × 74 yd)

Construction
- Opened: 17 July 1950; 76 years ago
- Demolished: 3 July 2017 partially.
- Architect: Federico Velasco

Tenants
- Borregos Salvajes (ONEFA) (1950–2016); C.F. Monterrey (1952–73, 1980–2015); Fundidores de Monterrey (LFA) (2017)

Estadio Tecnológico was a multi-purpose stadium in Monterrey, Nuevo León, Mexico. It was located on the campus of the Monterrey Institute of Technology and Higher Education (ITESM). It hosted football and American football games from 1950 to 2017.

Starting in 2017, the stadium was demolished and was replaced by the Estadio Borregos, completed in April 2019. The new stadium seats 10,000 and was designed for football and American football.

== History ==
Construction of a new stadium to house the Borregos Salvajes American football team began in August 1949. A society raised half a million pesos in 17 days in order to break ground, with Constructora Maiz Mier as the general contractor.

The stadium was formally opened on July 17, 1950 by Mexican President Miguel Alemán Valdés. Originally, it seated 20,000 spectators. In 1965, a new upper deck was added on the west side to bring the stadium's capacity to 33,600; this expansion was celebrated with a match between C.F. Monterrey and FK Vojvodina, champions of Yugoslavia, which the locals won 2–1.

The north end zone's "horseshoe" was added in 1986 to bring the stadium's capacity to 38,000 seats for its use in the 1986 Mexico FIFA World Cup. In the early 1990s, luxury boxes were added which reduced the capacity to its current figure.

In 1991, the first tartan athletics track in Mexico was installed in the Estadio Tecnológico. The original blue track was replaced with a more traditional red color in 2002.

By the mid-2000s, with the Estadio Tecnológico being the second-oldest venue in Liga MX at the time behind Estadio Azul in Mexico City and manager Miguel Herrera declaring it "obsolete", C.F. Monterrey began exploring plans for a new stadium. Administration at FEMSA, which owned the club, said that although they had presented plans to Monterrey Institute of Technology and Higher Education (ITESM) administration to add 8,000 seats by lowering the field and eliminating the athletics track, these had not been approved, and so they began planning for a new stadium at a site known as La Pastora. Additionally, the proposed expansion would have aggravated the already troublesome parking situation in the neighborhood and could have affected the view from the stadium's suites.

In February 2014, it was announced that the stadium would be demolished after its largest tenant, C.F. Monterrey, moved to Estadio BBVA Bancomer in 2015. The stadium made way for a urban redevelopment project known as Distrito Tec, which includes new academic buildings for the ITESM, a new sporting complex known as Wellness Center, and a new American football stadium for the Borregos Salvajes. Demolishion started on July 2017, preceded by an event in March, where the Borregos flag that had flown over the stadium was lowered to be raised again at the dedication of the new Estadio Tecnológico, planned for September 6, 2018 to coincide with the 75th anniversary of the ITESM. As part of the project, an artificial turf field will be laid down for a temporary venue in which the Borregos Salvajes played until the opening of the new venue in 2019.

On April 29, 2017, the Estadio Tecnológico opened to the public once more for a farewell ceremony attended by more than 12,000. Two women's soccer matches on June 10, one between the national teams of Mexico and Venezuela and a friendly between the women's teams of Tigres and Monterrey, were the final events held in the stadium before demolition began on the 29th.

== Tenants ==
=== C.F. Monterrey ===
From 1952 to 1973 and again from 1980 to 2015, the Estadio Tecnológico was home to one of Monterrey's most important soccer clubs, Club de Fútbol Monterrey (known as the Rayados). The club began playing its home matches at the Estadio Tecnólogico upon its revival as a Second Division squad in 1952—the first Rayados match saw them lose 3–1 to Veracruz—and remained there until 2015, except for a period between January 1973 and September 1980 when they played at the Estadio Universitario, home to rival club Tigres UANL.

In 1977–78, with preparations for the 1977 CONCACAF Championship underway at the Estadio Universitario, both Tigres and Rayados played at the Estadio Tecnológico, including the first Clásico Regio derby held in the stadium; it would be the first of 42 meetings between the two clubs venue, with the final fixture being a 2–2 draw in October 2014.

Monterrey won league titles in 1986 (Mexico 1986) and Apertura 2010 in the venue, as well as the Copa MX in 1991 and the CONCACAF Champions League in 2012–13.

The final Monterrey soccer fixture in the Estadio Tecnológico was played on May 9, 2015, a 2–2 tie against Pumas. The club began playing at the Estadio BBVA Bancomer in time for the Apertura 2015 tournament.

=== International soccer ===
International soccer came to the Estadio Tecnológico on several occasions.

The 1983 FIFA World Youth Championship marked the first FIFA event at the Estadio Tecnológico. The venue hosted five games, including three group stage fixtures, a quarterfinal and a semifinal.

Three matches of the 1986 FIFA World Cup were played at the Estadio Tecnológico, pitting the England national team against Portugal, Morocco and Poland.

=== Borregos Salvajes ===
The Estadio Tecnológico was initially built to house the university's American football team, which played in the Estadio Tecnológico through the 2016 season. During that time, the Borregos Salvajes won 22 national titles. On several occasions, they won the title in the Estadio Tecnológico, with the first such championship coming in 1993. The final Borregos Salvajes game in the stadium took place on November 4, 2016, when the Borregos beat the team representing the ITESM Campus México 28–0.

== 1986 FIFA World Cup ==
Date	Time	Team #1	Res.	Team #2	Round	Attendance
3 June 1986	16:00	Portugal	1–0	England	Group F	23,000
6 June 1986	16:00	England	0–0	Morocco	Group F	20,200
12 June 1986	16:00	Algeria	0–3	Spain	Group D	23,980

== Other events ==
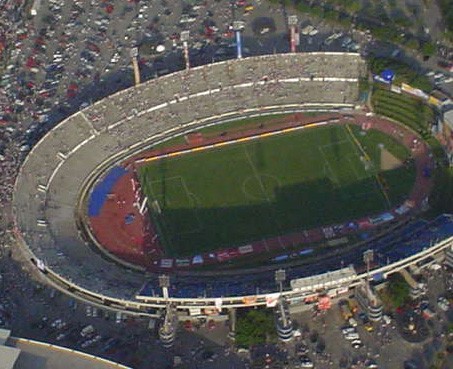
The Estadio Tecnólogico before a Rayados game in 2005

Estadio Tecnológico hosted the 2016 World University American Football Championship. The stadium also hosted the Fundidores de Monterrey professional American football team of the Liga de Fútbol Americano Profesional in its 2017 season. The club's final game of the regular season, played on April 9, 2017, was the final American football match at the venue. Additionally, track and field events were held in the stadium, such as the Galatlética 2005, which featured Ana Gabriela Guevara and Tonique Williams.

Several concerts also stopped by the Estadio Tecnológico, beginning with a visit by Bon Jovi in February 1990 for two shows on the New Jersey Syndicate Tour. On February 12, 2006, the Irish rock band U2 opened the 4th leg of its Vertigo Tour at the Estadio Tecnológico, to a crowd of 42,000. In 2010, the Black Eyed Peas played the Estadio Tecnológico in what turned out to be the final concert in the stadium.

== See also ==
- List of football stadiums in Mexico
