= 2010 InterLiga =

Tournament details
- Host country: United States
- Dates: January 2–12
- Teams: 8 (from 1 confederation)
- Venue: 3 (in 3 host cities)

Tournament statistics
- Matches played: 14
- Goals scored: 41 (2.93 per match)
- Top scorer: Salvador Cabañas (4)

The 2010 InterLiga was the seventh and last edition of the tournament. It determined the last two Mexican berths in the 2010 Copa Libertadores.

== Venues ==
Stadium	City	Capacity
Home Depot Center	Carson, CA	27,000
Pizza Hut Park	Frisco, TX	20,500
Robertson Stadium	Houston, TX	32,000

== Qualification ==
Qualification to this year's InterLiga remains the same. The qualified teams were the eight best-positioned teams in the 2009 Apertura general table who did not qualify for the 2010 Copa Libertadores directly (Morelia, San Luis, and Guadalajara) and did not qualify for the 2009–10 CONCACAF Champions League from the previous season (Toluca, Cruz Azul, Pachuca, and UNAM).

Pos	Team	Pld	W	D	L	GF	GA	GD	Pts	Qualification
1	Toluca	17	11	2	4	32	19	+13	35	Not eligible
2	Cruz Azul	17	11	0	6	35	19	+16	33	Not eligible
3	Morelia	17	10	3	4	31	15	+16	33	2010 Copa Libertadores Second Stage (Note: The berth to the 2010 Copa Libertadores goes to the highest placed team currently not participating in the 2009–10 CONCACAF Champions League, or that already have a berth in the 2010 Copa Libertadores. This excludes Toluca, Pachuca, Cruz Azul, UNAM, San Luis, and Guadalajara.)
4	América	17	8	6	3	29	16	+13	30	2010 InterLiga
5	Monterrey	17	9	3	5	27	16	+11	30	2010 InterLiga
6	Santos Laguna	17	7	6	4	29	24	+5	27	2010 InterLiga
7	Puebla	17	6	8	3	19	19	0	26	2010 InterLiga
8	Pachuca	17	7	3	7	24	29	−5	24	Not eligible
9	Atlante	17	7	2	8	18	23	−5	23	2010 InterLiga
10	UANL	17	5	7	5	23	18	+5	22	2010 InterLiga
11	San Luis	17	5	6	6	21	24	−3	21	Automatically qualified for Round of 16
12	Estudiantes Tecos	17	5	5	7	23	29	−6	20	2010 InterLiga
13	Chiapas	17	5	4	8	17	22	−5	19	2010 InterLiga
14	Guadalajara	17	5	4	8	23	29	−6	19	Automatically qualified for Round of 16
15	Atlas	17	5	3	9	14	25	−11	18	
16	Querétaro	17	5	3	9	17	29	−12	18	
17	UNAM	17	4	5	8	16	23	−7	17	Not eligible
18	Ciudad Juárez	17	0	6	11	7	26	−19	6	

Updated to match(es) played on November 14, 2009. Source: FeMexFut
Rules for classification: 1st points; 2nd goal difference; 3rd goals scored; 4th head-to-head score; 5th away goals; 6th draw

== Group stage ==
=== Group A ===
Team	Pld	W	D	L	GF	GA	GD	Pts
América	3	2	1	0	9	4	+5	7
Estudiantes Tecos	3	1	1	1	6	5	+1	4
Santos Laguna	3	1	0	2	4	5	−1	3
Atlante	3	1	0	2	2	7	−5	3

=== Group B ===
Team	Pld	W	D	L	GF	GA	GD	Pts
Puebla	3	2	0	1	6	3	+3	6
Monterrey	3	1	2	0	3	2	+1	5
Chiapas	3	0	2	1	2	3	−1	2
UANL	3	0	2	1	4	7	−3	2

== Finals ==
Kickoffs are given in UTC-6.

January 13, 2010
20:00

Puebla	2 – 3	Estudiantes Tecos
Acosta 4'; Olivera 47'	Report	Ruíz 51', 80'; Sambueza 89'

Home Depot Center, Carson, California
Attendance: 27,000
Referee: Baldomero Toledo (United States)

January 13, 2010
22:30

América	0 – 0 (a.e.t.)	Monterrey
	(Report)
Penalties
	1 – 3

Home Depot Center, Carson, California
Referee: Ricardo Salazar (United States)

== Goalscorers ==
4 goals

- (Paraguay) Salvador Cabañas (América)
- (Chile) Rodrigo Ruiz (Estudiantes Tecos)

2 goals

- (Brazil) Itamar (UANL)
- (Paraguay) Fredy Bareiro (Estudiantes Tecos)
- (Uruguay) Álvaro González (Puebla)
- (Argentina) Daniel Ludueña (Santos Laguna)
- (Uruguay) Nicolás Olivera (Puebla)
- (Guatemala) Carlos Ruiz (Puebla)

1 goal

- (Brazil) Rosinei (América)
- (Uruguay) Alejandro Acosta (Puebla)
- (Mexico) Edgar Andrade (Chiapas)
- (Mexico) Daniel Arreola (Atlante)
- (Argentina) José Basanta (Monterrey)
- (Argentina) Mauro Cejas (Estudiantes Tecos)
- (Mexico) Enrique Esqueda (América)
- (Mexico) Juan Carlos García (Puebla)
- (Mexico) Alfredo González Tahuilán (UANL)
- (Argentina) Lucas Lobos (UANL)

1 goal (continued)

- (Paraguay) Osvaldo Martínez (Monterrey)
- (Argentina) Daniel Montenegro (América)
- (Mexico) Ezequiel Orozco (Chiapas)
- (Mexico) Luis Ernesto Pérez (Monterrey)
- (Mexico) Ángel Reyna (América)
- (Mexico) Juan Pablo Rodríguez (Santos Laguna)
- (Mexico) Guillermo Rojas (Atlante)
- (Argentina) Rubens Sambueza (Estudiantes Tecos)
- (Mexico) Luis Alonso Sandoval (América)

== See also ==
- 2010 Copa Libertadores
- Primera División de México
