= 2011–12 Jaguares de Chiapas season =

Chiapas
2011–12 season
- Chairman: Ramón Morató Pereda
- Manager: José Guadalupe Cruz
- Stadium: Estadio Víctor Manuel Reyna
- Apertura 2011: 5th Final Phase Quarter-finals
- Clausura 2012: 8th Final Phase Quarter-finals
- Copa Mesoamericana 2011: Champion (1st title)
- Top goalscorer: League: Apertura: Jackson Martínez (10); Clausura: Jackson Martínez (10); All: Jackson Martínez (25)
Home colours	Away colours	Third colours

The 2011–12 Chiapas season was the 65th professional season of Mexico's top-flight football league. The season is split into two tournaments—the Torneo Apertura and the Torneo Clausura—each with identical formats and each contested by the same eighteen teams. Chiapas began their season on July 24, 2011 against Monterrey, Chiapas play their homes games on Saturdays at 5:00pm local time.

== Torneo Apertura ==
=== Squad ===
Note: Flags indicate national team as defined under FIFA eligibility rules; some limited exceptions apply. Players may hold more than one non-FIFA nationality.

No.	Pos.	Nation	Player
1	GK	MEX	Fabián Israel Villaseñor
2	DF	ARG	Miguel Ángel Martínez
3	DF	MEX	Jesús Roberto Chávez
4	DF	CHI	Ismael Fuentes (Captain)
5	DF	MEX	Omar Flores Serrano
6	MF	MEX	Gerardo Espinoza
7	DF	MEX	Oscar Francisco Razo
8	DF	MEX	Orlando Javier Rincón
9	FW	COL	Jackson Martínez
11	FW	COL	Luis Gabriel Rey *
13	MF	URU	Jorge Rodríguez
15	MF	MEX	Jorge Daniel Hernández
18	MF	MEX	Ricardo Esqueda

No.	Pos.	Nation	Player
19	MF	MEX	Edgar Andrade
20	FW	COL	Franco Faustino Arizala
21	GK	MEX	Gerardo Daniel Ruiz
23	GK	MEX	Edgar Hernández
26	MF	MEX	Christian Valdez
27	MF	MEX	Gerardo Martín Gómez
30	FW	USA	Gustavo Ruelas
35	MF	MEX	Jesús Castillo Ugarte
58	MF	MEX	David Andrade
90	DF	MEX	Leonardo Bedolla
93	FW	MEX	Diego Castellanos
99	MF	MEX	Armando Zamorano

=== Regular season ===
Win Draw Loss

==== Apertura 2011 results ====
July 24, 2011 Round 1	Chiapas	1 – 4	Monterrey	Estadio Victor Manuel Reyna, Tuxtla Gutierrez
18:00	Rey 25' (pen.); Espinoza (yellow card) 26'; E. Hernández (yellow card) 47'; Flores (yellow card) 59'; Valdéz (yellow card) 60'	report	L. Pérez 15' (pen.), 45' (pen.); Paredes (yellow card) 24'; Zavala (yellow card) 44'; Cardozo 90'; S. Pérez 90+2'	Referee: Miguel Ángel Ortega

July 31, 2011 Round 2	Guadalajara	2 – 1	Chiapas	Estadio Omnilife, Zapopan
17:00	Báez (yellow card) 32'; Arellano 67'; Fabián 71', (yellow card) 72'	Report	J. Hernández (yellow card) 26'; J. Martínez 47'; Razo (yellow card) 83'	Referee: Jorge Antonio Pérez

September 2, 2011 Round 3	Chiapas	3 – 2	Santos Laguna	Estadio Victor Manuel Reyna, Tuxtla Gutiérrez
20:00	Rodríguez (yellow card) 8'; Arizala (yellow card) 40', (goal) 53'; Rey 57', 74'; Razo (yellow card) 66'; Zamorano (yellow card) 66'	Report	Cárdenas 13'; Enríquez 82', (yellow card) 90'	Referee: Mauricio Morales

August 7, 2011 Round 4	Puebla	1 – 2	Chiapas	Estadio Cuauhtémoc, Puebla
12:00	Durán (yellow card) 13'; Luis García 5' (pen.); Cervantes (yellow card) 36'; Salinas (red card) 44'	Report	Arizala 31'; M. Martínez (red card) 62'; J. Martínez 73'	Referee: Erim Ramírez

August 13, 2011 Round 5	Chiapas	1 – 1	Cruz Azul	Estadio Victor Manuel Reyna, Tuxtla Gutiérrez
17:30	Rodríguez (yellow card) 33'; Razo (yellow card) 40'; Fuentes 58', (yellow card) 66'; J. Hernández (yellow card) 62'	Report	Chávez 6' (o.g.); Villa (yellow card) 53'; Castro (yellow card) 57'; Castro (yellow card) 73'	Referee: Miguel Ángel Ayala

August 20, 2011 Round 6	Querétaro	1 – 2	Chiapas	Estadio Corregidora, Querétaro
17:00	Vázquez (yellow card) 17'; Bueno (yellow card) 21', (goal) 73'	Report	E. Hernández (yellow card) 21'; Pérez 53' (o.g.); Rey 56'	Referee: Fernando Guerrero

August 26, 2011 Round 7	Chiapas	1 – 1	Toluca	Estadio Victor Manuel Reyna, Tuxtla Gutiérrez
20:10	Fuentes (yellow card) 6'; Arizala 67'	Report	Novaretti (yellow card) 65'; Alonso 71', (yellow card) 86'	Referee: Miguel Ángel Flores

September 9, 2011 Round 8	Estudiantes Tecos	0 – 2	Chiapas	Estadio Tres de Marzo, Zapopan
20:10	Sambueza (yellow card) 27'	Report	Fuentes (yellow card) 23'; Rey 59', 61'; J. Hernández (yellow card) 68'; J. Martínez (yellow card) 73'; Razo (yellow card) 90+2'	Referee: Roberto García Orozco

September 17, 2011 Round 9	Chiapas	5 – 3	América	Estadio Victor Manuel Reyna, Tuxtla Gutierrez
17:00	Andrade 8', 57'; Valdéz 29'; Arizala 42'; M. Martínez (yellow card) 45'; Fuentes (yellow card) 84'; J. Martínez 87'	Report	Benítez 25'; Montenegro 46', 67'; Rojas (yellow card) 54'; R. González (yellow card) 86'	Referee: José Alfredo Peñaloza

September 24, 2011 Round 10	UANL	1 – 1	Chiapas	Estadio Universitario, San Nicolás
19:00	Álvarez (yellow card) 49'; Lobos 79', (yellow card) 80'	Report	Valdéz (yellow card) 23'; M. Martínez (yellow card) 44'; Rodríguez (yellow card) 49', (goal) 89'; Andrade (yellow card) 76'; Razo (yellow card) 81'	Referee: Ricardo Arellano

September 30, 2011 Round 11	Chiapas	1 – 1	Atlas	Estadio Victor Manuel Reyna, Tuxtla Gutierrez
19:45	Rey 34', (yellow card) 90'; Espinoza (yellow card) 46'; J. Martínez (yellow card) 78'	Report	Torres (yellow card) 2'; Lacerda (yellow card) 43'; Arreola 47', (yellow card) 80'; Jiménez (yellow card) 89'	Referee: César Arturo Ramos

October 8, 2011 Round 12	Pachuca	1 – 0	Chiapas	Estadio Hidalgo, Pachuca
19:00	Hernández 7'; Esqueda (yellow card) 41'; Cejas (yellow card) 86'; Velázquez (yellow card) 89'	Report	Fuentes (yellow card) 21'; Razo (yellow card) 52' (yellow-red card) 71'; Rey (yellow card) 58'; Arizala (yellow card) 73'	Referee: Miguel Ángel Chacón

October 15, 2011 Round 13	Chiapas	1 – 1	Atlante	Estadio Victor Manuel Reyna, Tuxtla Gutiérrez
17:00	Zamorano (yellow card) 42'; J. Martínez 57'; Arizala (yellow card) 62'	Report	Martínez 75' (pen.)	Referee: Francisco Chacón

October 22, 2011 Round 14	Chiapas	3 – 1	San Luis	Estadio Victor Manuel Reyna, Tuxtla Gutiérrez
17:00	J. Martínez 31', 43'; M. Martínez 66'	Report	de la Barrera (yellow card) 2'; Moreno (yellow card) 65', (goal) 77'; Torres (yellow card) 84'	Referee: Roberto García Orozco

October 26, 2011 Round 15	Tijuana	2 – 0	Chiapas	Estadio Caliente, Tijuana
20:00	Sand 58'; Abrego (yellow card) 70'; Ruiz 77'	Report	Rodríguez (yellow card) 12'; Esqueda (yellow card) 45' (yellow-red card) 56'; J. Hernández (yellow card) 63'	Referee: Jorge Isaac Rojas

October 29, 2011 Round 16	Chiapas	4 – 0	UNAM	Estadio Victor Manuel Reyna, Tuxtla Gutiérrez
17:00	J. Martínez 10', 28' (pen.); Andrade 20', 89'; E. Hernández (yellow card) 72'	Report	Castro (yellow card) 15'; M. Palacios (yellow card) 78'	Referee: Mauricio Morales

November 4, 2011 Round 17	Morelia	1 – 0	Chiapas	Estadio Morelos, Morelia
20:10	Huiqui (yellow card) 29' (yellow-red card) 90+1'; Márquez (yellow card) 60'; Sabah 65'	Report	M. Martínez (yellow card) 24' (yellow-red card) 53'; Arizala (yellow card) 28'; Razo (yellow card) 34'	Referee: Paul Delgadillo

=== Final phase ===
November 20, 2011 Quarter-finals	Chiapas	2 – 2	Santos Laguna	Estadio Victor Manuel Reyna, Tuxtla Gutierrez
16:00	Razo (yellow card) 31'; J. Martínez 84'; Arizala 90+2'	Report	Baloy 4'; Rodríguez (yellow card) 18'; Peralta 32'; Suárez (yellow card) 61'; Cárdenas (red card) 71'; Mares (yellow card) 84'	Referee: Ricardo Arellano

November 27, 2011 Quarter-finals	Santos Laguna	2 – 1	Chiapas	Estadio Corona, Torreón
17:00	Peralta (yellow card) 21'; Quintero 41'; Ludueña 73'; Sánchez (yellow card) 90'	Report	J. Martínez 66'; Rodríguez (yellow card) 86'	Referee: Roberto García Orozco

Santos advanced 4–3 on aggregate

=== Goalscorers ===
Position	Nation	Name	Goals scored
1.	(Colombia)	Jackson Martínez	10
2.	(Colombia)	Luis Gabriel Rey	7
3.	(Colombia)	Franco Arizala	5
4.	(Mexico)	Edgar Andrade	4
5.	(Chile)	Ismael Fuentes	1
5.	(Argentina)	Miguel Ángel Martínez	1
5.	(Uruguay)	Jorge Rodríguez	1
5.	(Mexico)	Christian Valdéz	1
5.		Own Goals	1
TOTAL			31

=== Results ===
==== Results summary ====
Overall								Home						Away					
Pld	W	D	L	GF	GA	GD	Pts	W	D	L	GF	GA	GD	W	D	L	GF	GA	GD
17	7	5	5	28	23	+5	26	4	4	1	20	14	+6	3	1	4	8	9	−1

Last updated: 5 November 2011.
Source: Apertura 2011 results

==== Results by round ====
Round	1	2	3	4	5	6	7	8	9	10	11	12	13	14	15	16	17
Ground	H	A	H	A	H	A	H	A	H	A	H	A	H	H	A	H	A
Result	L	L	W	W	D	W	D	W	W	D	D	L	D	W	L	W	L
Position	18	17	18	18	16	13	13	4	1	1	2	6	5	3	5	2	5

Updated to match(es) played on 6 November 2011. Source: Apertura 2011 results and mediotiempo.com
A = Away; H = Home; W = Win; D = Draw; L = Loss

== Transfers ==
=== In ===
#	Pos	Nat	Player	Age	From	Date	Notes
	MF	(Mexico)	Luis Miguel Noriega	26	Morelia	December 12, 2011	
	DF	(Mexico)	Yasser Corona	24	Morelia	December 12, 2011	
	MF	(Mexico)	Hibert Ruíz	24	Querétaro	December 20, 2011	

=== Out ===
#	Pos	Nat	Player	Age	To	Date	Notes
26	MF	(Mexico)	Christian Valdéz	27	Morelia	December 12, 2011	
7	DF	(Mexico)	Óscar Razo	27	Morelia	December 12, 2011	

== Torneo Clausura ==
=== Squad ===
Note: Flags indicate national team as defined under FIFA eligibility rules; some limited exceptions apply. Players may hold more than one non-FIFA nationality.

No.	Pos.	Nation	Player
1	GK	MEX	Fabián Villaseñor
2	DF	ARG	Miguel Ángel Martínez
4	DF	CHI	Ismael Fuentes
5	DF	MEX	Omar Flores
6	MF	MEX	Gerardo Espinoza
7	MF	MEX	Yasser Corona
8	DF	MEX	George Corral
9	FW	COL	Jackson Martinez
11	FW	COL	Luis Gabriel Rey
13	MF	URU	Jorge Rodríguez

No.	Pos.	Nation	Player
14	MF	MEX	Luis Miguel Noriega
15	MF	MEX	Jorge Daniel Hernández
17	MF	MEX	Hibert Ruíz
18	MF	MEX	Ricardo Esqueda
19	MF	MEX	Édgar Andrade
20	FW	COL	Franco Arizala
21	GK	MEX	Gerardo Ruiz
23	GK	MEX	Édgar Hernández
35	FW	MEX	Jesús Castillo

=== Regular season ===
Win Draw Loss

==== Clausura 2012 results ====
January 7, 2012 Round 1	Monterrey	2 – 1	Chiapas	Estadio Tecnológico, Monterrey
19:00	Mier (yellow card) 34'; Ayoví 53', 55'; Chávez (yellow card) 63'	Report	Zamorano (yellow card) 69'; Fuentes (yellow card) 70'; J. Martínez 80'	Referee: Jorge Eduardo Gasso

January 14, 2012 Round 2	Chiapas	3 – 1	Guadalajara	Estadio Victor Manuel Reyna, Tuxtla Gutiérrez
17:00	Esqueda (yellow card) 13'; Zamorano (yellow card) 18'; Corona 25'; Flores (yellow card) 52'; Fuentes (yellow card) 57'; M. Martínez (yellow card) 62' (yellow-red card) 79'; Rodríguez 63'; J. Martínez 72', (yellow card) 90+3'; E. Hernández (yellow card) 90+4'	Report	Báez (yellow card) 32'; Reynoso 53', (red card) 88'; Fabián (yellow card) 62'; Sánchez (yellow card) 68'; Enríquez (yellow card) 74' (red card) 83'	Referee: Miguel Ángel Flores

January 21, 2012 Round 3	Santos Laguna	1 – 0	Chiapas	Estadio TSM Corona, Torreón
19:00	Quintero (yellow card) 19'; Ramírez (yellow card) 79'; Galindo 86'	Report	Rey (yellow card) 52'; J. Hernández (yellow card) 65'	Referee: Óscar Macias

January 28, 2012 Round 4	Chiapas	0 – 1	Puebla	Estadio Victor Manuel Reyna, Tuxtla Gutiérrez
17:00	Zamorano (yellow card) 38'; J. Hernández (yellow card) 42'; Corral (yellow card) 57'	Report	Beasley 3'; Lacerda (yellow card) 7'; Álvarez (yellow card) 28'; Juárez (yellow card) 55'; Salinas (yellow card) 88'	Referee: Mauricio Morales

February 4, 2012 Round 5	Cruz Azul	2 – 0	Chiapas	Estadio Azul, Mexico City
17:00	Maranhão (yellow card) 45+'; Pereira 55', (yellow card) 86'; Araujo (yellow card) 61'; Orozco 61'	Report	Esqueda (yellow card) 22'; Espinoza (yellow card) 68'	Referee: Miguel Ángel Ayala

February 11, 2012 Round 6	Chiapas	3 – 0	Querétaro	Estadio Victor Manuel Reyna, Tuxtla Gutiérrez
17:00	Martínez 8', 88'; Andrade (yellow card) 76'; Arizala 83', (yellow card) 90+3'	Report	Alemanno (red card) 58'; Jiménez (yellow card) 62'; Mondragón (yellow card) 71'; García Arias (yellow card) 90+1'	Referee: Francisco Chacón

February 19, 2012 Round 7	Toluca	3 – 1	Chiapas	Estadio Nemesio Díez, Toluca
12:00	Esquivel 12', 74'; Alonso 25'; Sinha (yellow card) 39'; Novaretti (yellow card) 66'; Ríos (yellow card) 77'	Report	Flores (yellow card) 38'; M. Martínez (yellow card) 39'; Andrade (yellow card) 48'; J. Martínez 79'; Arizala (yellow card) 90+2'	Referee: Marco Antonio Rodríguez

February 25, 2012 Round 8	Chiapas	1 – 0	Estudiantes Tecos	Estadio Victor Manuel Reyna, Tuxtla Gutiérrez
17:00	Noriega (yellow card) 19'; Rey 29'; Zamorano (yellow card) 55'	Report	Guttiérez (yellow card) 39'; Pérez (yellow card) 44'	Referee: Jorge Antonio Pérez

March 4, 2012 Round 9	América	2 – 0	Chiapas	Estadio Azteca, Mexico City
16:00	Montenegro 27'; Herrera (red card) 88' (manager); Gallardo 90+3'	Report	E. Hernández (yellow card) 83'	Referee: Ricardo Arellano

March 10, 2012 Round 10	Chiapas	2 – 2	UANL	Estadio Victor Manuel Reyna, Tuxtla Gutiérrez
17:00	Noriega (yellow card) 15'; Rey 48', 57'; J. Martínez (yellow card) 64'; Corral (yellow card) 70'; Fuentes (yellow card) 87'	Report	Ayala (yellow card) 10'; Álvarez (yellow card) 26'; Lobos 39'; Edno 71' (pen.); Salcido (yellow card) 75'	Referee: Maurico Morales

March 17, 2012 Round 11	Atlas	0 – 3	Chiapas	Estadio Jalisco, Guadalajara
20:45	Ayala (yellow card) 33'; Cufré (yellow card) 37'; Erpen (red card) 63'; Santos (red card) 89'	Report	Andrade (yellow card) 21'; J. Martínez (yellow card) 22', (goal) 73', 84'; Rey 41'; Noriega (yellow card) 45+'	Referee: Antony Zanjuampa

March 22, 2012 Round 12	Chiapas	3 – 2	Pachuca	Estadio Victor Manuel Reyna, Tuxtla Gutiérrez
20:30	Noriega (red card) 2'; M. Martínez (yellow card) 10'; Rey 14', 23'; J. Martínez (yellow card) 68'; Esqueda 80'	Report	Castillo (yellow card) 19', (goal) 37'; Arreola (yellow card) 32'; Franco (yellow card) 57'; Borja 72', (yellow card) 74' (yellow-red card) 90+2'; Brambila (yellow card) 86'	Referee: Jorge Antonio Pérez

March 31, 2012 Round 13	Atlante	2 – 2	Chiapas	Estadio Andrés Quintana Roo, Cancún
21:00	Jiménez (yellow card) 5'; Cuevas (yellow card) 22'; Hernández (yellow card) 44'; Muñoz (red card) 47'; Arroyo 60'; Fonseca 82'	Report	J. Martínez (yellow card) 5'; Ruiz (yellow card) 19'; Rey 28', (yellow card) 52'; Andrade 63'; M. Martínez (yellow card) 83'	Referee: Miguel Ángel Ortega

April 7, 2012 Round 14	San Luis	2 – 3	Chiapas	Estadio Alfonso Lastras, San Luis Potosí
19:00	Moreno 30' (pen.), 77' (pen.); Torres (yellow card) 38'	Report	Alcántar 4' (o.g.); M. Martínez (yellow card) 30' (yellow-red card) 76'; J. Martínez (yellow card) 55'; Andrade 57'; Rey 83'	Referee: Ricardo Arellano

April 13, 2012 Round 15	Chiapas	0 – 0	Tijuana	Estadio Victor Manuel Reyna, Tuxtla Gutiérrez
20:10	Andrade (yellow card) 10'; Rodríguez (yellow card) 43'	Report	Almazán (yellow card) 39'; Abrego (yellow card) 88'	Referee: Miguel Ángel Chacón

April 22, 2012 Round 16	UNAM	0 – 3	Chiapas	Estadio Olímpico Universitario, Mexico City
12:00			Esqueda (yellow card) 32'; Arizala 46', 85'; J. Martínez 85'	Referee: Roberto García Orozco

April 28, 2012 Round 17	Chiapas	1 – 0	Morelia	Estadio Victor Manuel Reyna, Tuxtla Gutiérrez
17:00	Esqueda 68'	Report	Gastélum (yellow card) 14'; Rojas (yellow card) 54'	Referee: Erim Ramírez

=== Final phase ===
May 3, 2012 Quarter-finals	Chiapas	3 – 4	Santos Laguna	Estadio Victor Manuel Reyna, Tuxtla Gutiérrez
19:00	Rey 29'; J. Martínez 31', 74', (yellow card) 79'; J. Hernández (yellow card) 50'; Rodríguez (yellow card) 58'; Cipriano (yellow card) 69'	Report	Ludueña 24', 59'; Baloy (yellow card) 26'; Peralta 39'; Estrada (yellow card) 50'; Quintero 90+5'	Referee: José Alfredo Peñaloza

May 6, 2012 Quarter-finals	Santos Laguna	2 – 1	Chiapas	Estadio TSM Corona, Torreón
18:00	Quintero 14'; Peralta 37'	Report	Zamorano 7'; Arizala (yellow card) 48'; Fuentes (yellow card) 70'; J. Hernández (yellow card) 79'	Referee: Roberto García Orozco

Santos Laguna advanced 6–4 on aggregate

=== Goalscorers ===
==== Regular season ====
Position	Nation	Name	Goals scored
1.	(Colombia)	Jackson Martínez	8
1.	(Colombia)	Luis Gabriel Rey	8
3.	(Colombia)	Franco Arizala	3
4.	(Mexico)	Edgar Andrade	2
5.	(Mexico)	Ricardo Esqueda	2
6.	(Mexico)	Yasser Corona	1
6.	(Uruguay)	Jorge Rodríguez	1
6.		Own Goals	1
TOTAL			26

==== Final phase ====
Position	Nation	Name	Goals scored
1.	(Colombia)	Jackson Martínez	2
2.	(Colombia)	Luis Gabriel Rey	1
2.	(Mexico)	Armando Zamorano	1
TOTAL			4

=== Results ===
==== Results summary ====
Overall								Home						Away					
Pld	W	D	L	GF	GA	GD	Pts	W	D	L	GF	GA	GD	W	D	L	GF	GA	GD
17	8	3	6	26	19	+7	27	5	2	1	13	6	+7	3	1	5	13	13	0

Last updated: 28 April 2012.
Source: Clausura 2012 results

==== Results by round ====
Round	1	2	3	4	5	6	7	8	9	10	11	12	13	14	15	16	17
Ground	A	H	A	H	A	H	A	H	A	H	A	H	A	A	H	A	H
Result	L	W	L	L	L	W	L	W	L	D	W	W	D	W	D	W	W
Position	14	10	13	16	16	12	15	12	13	14	10	9	10	8	9	9	8

Updated to match(es) played on 29 April 2012. Source: Clausura 2012 results and mediotiempo.com
A = Away; H = Home; W = Win; D = Draw; L = Loss

== Copa Mesoamericana ==
Jaguares participated in the Copa Mesoamericana 2011 in Tapachula, Chiapas from 28 to 30 December 2011.

=== Semifinal ===
December 28, 2011 Semifinals	Chiapas (Mexico)	3 – 1	(Guatemala) Comunicaciones	Estadio Olímpico de Tapachula, Tapachula
	M. Martínez 43'; J. Martínez 56', 89'	Report	27' Medina

=== Final ===
December 30, 2011 Final	Chiapas (Mexico)	4 – 1	(El Salvador) Isidro Metapán	Estadio Olímpico de Tapachula, Tapachula
	J. Martínez 7', 11', 65'; Corona 44'	Report	76' Pacheco
