= 2010–11 Jaguares de Chiapas season =

The 2010–11 Chiapas season was the 64th professional season of Mexico's top-flight football league. The season is split into two tournaments—the Torneo Apertura and the Torneo Clausura—each with identical formats and each contested by the same eighteen teams. Chiapas began their season on July 24, 2010, against Necaxa, Chiapas played their homes games on Saturdays at 5:00pm.

== Torneo Apertura ==
=== Squad ===
Note: Flags indicate national team as defined under FIFA eligibility rules; some limited exceptions apply. Players may hold more than one non-FIFA nationality.

No.	Pos.	Nation	Player
1	GK	MEX	Jorge Villalpando
2	DF	MEX	Christian Armas
3	DF	MEX	Jaime Durán
4	DF	CHI	Ismael Fuentes
5	DF	MEX	Omar Flores
6	DF	MEX	Diego Ordaz
7	DF	MEX	Óscar Razo
8	MF	MEX	Alan Zamora
9	FW	COL	Jackson Martínez
10	MF	BRA	Danilinho
11	FW	MEX	Carlos Ochoa
12	DF	MEX	Salvador Medina
13	MF	URU	Jorge Rodríguez
14	DF	MEX	Marvin Cabrera
15	DF	MEX	Gerardo Flores

No.	Pos.	Nation	Player
16	FW	COL	Luis Fernando Mosquera
17	MF	MEX	Luis Ricardo Esqueda
18	FW	MEX	Francisco Javier Serrano
19	MF	MEX	Edgar Andrade
22	DF	MEX	Hugo Sánchez Guerrero
25	GK	MEX	Cristian Flores
26	MF	MEX	Christian Valdéz
28	DF	MEX	Jorge Coste
29	DF	MEX	Eduardo Chávez
30	MF	USA	Frankie López
33	FW	ENG	Antonio Pedroza
45	MF	MEX	Efraín Dimayuga
48	FW	MEX	Jorge Daniel Hernández
54	FW	MEX	Hilario Tristán
100	MF	MEX	Luis Raúl Torres

=== Regular season ===
July 24, 2010 Round 1	Chiapas	1 – 1	Necaxa	Estadio Victor Manuel Reyna, Tuxtla Gutierrez
5:00pm	Danilinho 90+2'	Report	Gandín 70'	Referee: Miguel Ángel Flores

August 1, 2010 Round 2	América	3 – 0	Chiapas	Estadio Azteca, Mexico City
4:30pm	Vuoso 7'; Sánchez 68'; Esqueda 90+1'	Report		Referee: Jorge Gasso

August 7, 2010 Round 3	Chiapas	1 – 1	Toluca	Estadio Victor Manuel Reyna, Tuxtla Gutierrez
5:00pm	Danilinho 7'	Report	Brizuela 68'	Referee: José Alfredo Peñaloza

August 14, 2010 Round 4	Santos Laguna	1 – 0	Chiapas	Estadio Corona, Torreón
5:00pm	Benítez 46'	Report		Referee: Miguel Ángel Ayala

August 21, 2010 Round 5	Chiapas	2 – 3	Cruz Azul	Estadio Victor Manuel Reyna, Tuxtla Gutierrez
5:00pm	Rodríguez 29'; Andrade 49'	Report	Giménez 15', 62', 77'	Referee: Julio Escobar

August 28, 2010 Round 6	Monterrey	1 – 1	Chiapas	Estadio Tecnológico, Monterrey
7:00pm	Suazo 28'		Danilinho 23'	Referee: Roberto García

September 11, 2010 Round 7	Chiapas	4 – 0	Puebla	Estadio Victor Manuel Reyna, Tuxtla Gutierrez
5:00pm	Ochoa 42', 55'; Valdéz 52'; Rodríguez 59'	Report		Referee: Paul Delgadillo

September 18, 2010 Round 8	Guadalajara	0 – 3	Chiapas	Estadio Omnilife, Zapopan
7:00pm		Report	Ochoa 14', 90+1', 90+4'	Referee: Mauricio Morales

September 25, 2010 Round 9	Chiapas	2 – 1	San Luis	Estadio Victor Manuel Reyna, Tuxtla Gutierrez
5:00pm	Rodríguez 11'; Ochoa 68'	Report	Moreno 13'	Referee: Francisco Chacón

October 1, 2010 Round 10	Estudiantes Tecos	0 – 0	Chiapas	Estadio Tres de Marzo, Zapopan
8:00pm		Report		Referee: Ricardo Arellano

October 9, 2010 Round 11	Chiapas	2 – 0	Atlante	Estadio Victor Manuel Reyna, Tuxtla Gutierrez
5:00pm	Rodríguez 36'; Danilinho 76'	Report		Referee: Miguel Ángel Ortega

October 17, 2010 Round 12	UNAM	1 – 0	Chiapas	Estadio Olímpico Universitario, Mexico City
12:00pm	Bravo 32'	Report		Referee: Marco Antonio Rodríguez

October 23, 2010 Round 13	Chiapas	2 – 0	Pachuca	Estadio Victor Manuel Reyna, Tuxtla Gutierrez
5:00pm	Rodríguez 34'; Martínez 74'	Report		Referee: Fernando Guerrero

October 27, 2010 Round 14	Chiapas	0 – 0	Morelia	Estadio Victor Manuel Reyna, Tuxtla Gutierrez
8:00pm		Report		Referee: Fabricio Morales

October 30, 2010 Round 15	UANL	0 – 0	Chiapas	Estadio Universitario, San Nicolás
7:00pm		Report		Referee: Mauricio Morales

November 6, 2010 Round 16	Chiapas	2 – 1	Atlas	Estadio Victor Manuel Reyna, Tuxtla Gutierrez
5:00pm	Razo 13'; Martínez 74'	Report	Fuentes 59'	Referee: Jaime Herrera

November 13, 2010 Round 17	Querétaro	1 – 1	Chiapas	Estadio Victor Manuel Reyna, Tuxtla Gutierrez
5:00pm	Órteman 79'	Report	Rodríguez 79'	Referee: Ricardo Arellano

=== Final phase ===
November 18, 2010 Quarterfinals	Chiapas	1 – 1	Santos Laguna	Estadio Victor Manuel Reyna, Tuxtla Gutierrez
8:00pm	Arce 22'	Report	Ochoa 33'	Referee: Jorge Eduardo Gasso

November 21, 2010 Quarterfinals	Santos Laguna	1 – 0	Chiapas	Estadio Corona, Torreón
6:00pm	Órteman 79'	Report	Rodríguez 90+5'	Referee: Roberto García

=== Goalscorers ===
Position	Nation	Name	Goals scored
1	(Mexico)	Carlos Ochoa	7
2	(Uruguay)	[[Jorge Rodríguez (footballer, born 1985)}|Jorge Rodríguez]]	6
3	(Brazil)	Danilinho	4
4	(Colombia)	Jackson Martínez	2
5	(Mexico)	Edgar Andrade	1
5	(Mexico)	Óscar Razo	1
5	(Mexico)	Christian Valdéz	1
TOTAL			22

== Results ==
=== Results summary ===
Overall								Home						Away					
Pld	W	D	L	GF	GA	GD	Pts	W	D	L	GF	GA	GD	W	D	L	GF	GA	GD
17	6	7	4	21	14	+7	25	5	3	1	16	7	+9	1	4	3	5	7	−2

Last updated: 15 January 2011.
Source: Apertura 2010 results

=== Results by round ===
Round	1	2	3	4	5	6	7	8	9	10	11	12	13	14	15	16	17
Ground	H	A	H	A	H	A	H	A	H	A	H	A	H	H	A	H	A
Result	D	L	D	L	L	D	W	W	W	D	W	L	W	D	D	W	D
Position	7	15	14	15	17	17	15	12	8	9	5	9	7	8	7	6	6

Updated to match(es) played on 15 January 2011. Source: Apertura 2010 results and mediotiempo.com
A = Away; H = Home; W = Win; D = Draw; L = Loss

== Torneo Clausura ==
=== Squad ===
Note: Flags indicate national team as defined under FIFA eligibility rules; some limited exceptions apply. Players may hold more than one non-FIFA nationality.

No.	Pos.	Nation	Player
1	GK	MEX	Jorge Villalpando
2	DF	ARG	Miguel Ángel Martínez
3	DF	MEX	Jesús Chávez
4	DF	CHI	Ismael Fuentes (Captain)
5	DF	MEX	Omar Flores
7	DF	MEX	Óscar Razo
8	MF	MEX	Alan Zamora
9	FW	COL	Jackson Martínez
10	MF	ARG	Damián Manso
11	MF	MEX	Guillermo Rojas
12	GK	MEX	Fabián Villaseñor
13	MF	URU	Jorge Rodríguez
14	MF	MEX	Francisco Torres
17	MF	MEX	Hiber Ruíz

No.	Pos.	Nation	Player
18	MF	MEX	Ricardo Esqueda
19	MF	MEX	Édgar Andrade
21	GK	MEX	Gerardo Daniel Ruiz
22	DF	MEX	Hugo Sánchez Guerrero
23	FW	MEX	Antonio Salazar
26	MF	MEX	Christian Valdéz
27	DF	MEX	Jaime Durán
28	DF	MEX	Marvin Cabrera
29	FW	MEX	Julio Daniel Frías
30	MF	USA	Frankie López
33	FW	ENG	Antonio Pedroza
45	MF	MEX	Efraín Dimayuga
48	FW	MEX	Jorge Daniel Hernández

=== Regular season ===
January 7, 2011 Round 1	Necaxa	0 – 1	Chiapas	Estadio Victoria, Aguascalientes
8:10pm		Report	Manso 48'	Referee: Fernando Guerrero

January 15, 2011 Round 2	Chiapas	2 – 2	América	Estadio Víctor Manuel Reyna, Tuxtla Gutierrez
5:00pm	Valdez 29'; Razo 64'	Report	Vuoso 57' (pen.); Olivera 90+3'	Referee: Julio David Escobar

January 23, 2011 Round 3	Toluca	2 – 0	Chiapas	Estadio Nemesio Díez, Toluca
12:00pm	Calderón 60'; Ayoví 62'	Report		Referee: Juan Genaro Medrano

January 29, 2011 Round 4	Chiapas	1 – 2	Santos Laguna	Estadio Victor Manuel Reyna, Tuxtla Gutierrez
5:00pm	Flores 71'	Report	Benítez 37'; Quintero 48'	Referee: Jorge Macías Romo

February 5, 2011 Round 5	Cruz Azul	2 – 0	Chiapas	Estadio Azul, Mexico City
5:00pm	Giménez 37'; Villa 57'	Report		Referee: Jaime Herrera

February 12, 2011 Round 6	Chiapas	1 – 4	Monterrey	Estadio Tecnológico, Monterrey
7:00pm	Valdez 36'	Report	Suazo 9', 31' (pen.), 78' de Nigris 81'	Referee: Roberto García

February 20, 2011 Round 7	Puebla	1 – 0	Chiapas	Estadio Cuauhtémoc, Puebla
12:00pm	Borja 41'	Report		Referee: Mauricio Morales

February 26, 2011 Round 8	Chiapas	1 – 0	Guadalajara	Estadio Victor Manuel Reyna, Tuxtla Gutierrez
5:00pm	Frías 8'	Report		Referee: Francisco Chacón

March 5, 2011 Round 9	San Luis	0 – 0	Chiapas	Estadio Alfonso Lastras, San Luis Potosí
8:45pm		Report		Referee: Ricardo Arellano

March 12, 2011 Round 10	Chiapas	0 – 2	Estudiantes Tecos	Estadio Victor Manuel Reyna, Tuxtla Gutierrez
5:00pm		Report	García 7'; López 66'	Referee: Jorge Eduardo Gasso

March 19, 2011 Round 11	Atlante	5 – 1	Chiapas	Estadio Quintana Roo, Cancún
9:00pm	Bermúdez 18', 49'; Ortiz 30'; Fonseca 34', 77'	Report	Valdez 90'	Referee: Miguel Ángel Ortega

April 2, 2011 Round 12	Chiapas	3 – 1	UNAM	Estadio Victor Manuel Reyna, Tuxtla Gutierrez
5:00pm	Salazar 18', 25'; Andrade 33'	Report	Espinosa 77'	Referee: Erim Ramirez

April 9, 2011 Round 13	Pachuca	3 – 0	Chiapas	Estadio Hidalgo, Pachuca
7:00pm	Gómez 71', 78'; Arizala 80'	Report		Referee: Marco Antonio Rodríguez

April 12, 2011 Round 14	Morelia	2 – 1	Chiapas	Estadio Morelos, Morelia
8:30pm	Márquez 84'; Sepúlveda 87'	Report	Sánchez 66'	Referee: Mauricio Morales

April 16, 2011 Round 15	Chiapas	0 – 1	UANL	Estadio Victor Manuel Reyna, Tuxtla Gutierrez
5:00pm		Report	Álvarez 78'	Referee: Juan Genaro Medrano

April 23, 2011 Round 16	Atlas	2 – 0	Chiapas	Estadio Jalisco, Guadalajara
8:45pm	Jiménez 21'; Barraza 74'	Report		Referee: Ricardo Arellano

April 30, 2011 Round 17	Chiapas	4 – 1	Querétaro	Estadio Victor Manuel Reyna, Tuxtla Gutierrez
5:00pm	Fuentes 47'; Rodríguez 55'; Martínez 78' (pen.), 90+2'	Report	Bueno 16'	Referee: Miguel Ángel Chacón

=== Goalscorers ===
Position	Nation	Name	Goals scored
1	(Mexico)	Christian Valdéz	3
2	(Colombia)	Jackson Martínez	2
2	(Mexico)	Antonio Salazar	2
4	(Mexico)	Edgar Andrade	1
4	(Mexico)	Julio Daniel Frías	1
4	(Mexico)	Óscar Razo	1
4	(Chile)	Ismael Fuentes	1
4	(Argentina)	Damián Manso	1
4	(Mexico)	Omar Flores	1
4	(Uruguay)	Jorge Rodríguez	1
4	(Mexico)	Hugo Sánchez Guerrero	1
TOTAL			15

=== Results ===
==== Results summary ====
Overall								Home						Away					
Pld	W	D	L	GF	GA	GD	Pts	W	D	L	GF	GA	GD	W	D	L	GF	GA	GD
17	4	2	11	15	30	−15	14	3	1	3	12	11	+1	1	1	8	3	19	−16

Last updated: 6 May 2011.
Source: Clausura 2011 results

==== Results by round ====
Round	1	2	3	4	5	6	7	8	9	10	11	12	13	14	15	16	17
Ground	A	H	A	H	A	H	A	H	A	H	A	H	A	A	H	A	H
Result	W	D	L	L	L	L	L	W	D	L	L	W	L	L	L	L	W
Position	6	5	8	13	15	17	18	16	16	18	18	18	18	18	18	18	18

Updated to match(es) played on 6 May 2011. Source: Clausura 2011 results and mediotiempo.com
A = Away; H = Home; W = Win; D = Draw; L = Loss
