= 2012–13 Jaguares de Chiapas season =

Chiapas
2012–13 season
- Chairman: Ramón Morató Pereda
- Manager: José Guadalupe Cruz
- Stadium: Estadio Víctor Manuel Reyna
- Apertura 2012: 11th
- Clausura 2013: 14th
- Copa MX (Apertura): Group stage
- Copa MX (Clausura): Semi-finals
- Top goalscorer: League: Apertura: Luis Gabriel Rey {8} Clausura: Luis Gabriel Rey (9); All: Luis Gabriel Rey (17)
- Highest home attendance: Apertura: 23,547 vs UNAM (November 2, 2012) (Note: Based on the highest attendance in the Apertura 2012 results section); Clausura: 24,500 vs América (January 11, 2013) (Note: Based on the highest attendance in the Clausura 2013 Results section)
- Lowest home attendance: Apertura: 7,244 vs Querétaro (August 24, 2012) (Note: Based on the lowest attendance in the Apertura 2012 results section); Clausura: 7,752 vs Morelia (March 15, 2013) (Note: Based on the lowest attendance in the Clausura 2013 results section)
Home colours	Away colours

The 2012–13 Chiapas season was the 66th professional season of Mexico's top-flight football league and Jaguares de Chiapas final season in the Liga MX. The season is split into two tournaments—the Torneo Apertura and the Torneo Clausura—each with identical formats and each contested by the same eighteen teams. Chiapas began their season on July 20, 2012, against UANL, Chiapas played their homes games on Fridays at 7:30pm local time. Chiapas did not qualify to the final phase in either the Apertura or Clausura tournament.

== Torneo Apertura ==
=== Squad ===
Note: Flags indicate national team as defined under FIFA eligibility rules; some limited exceptions apply. Players may hold more than one non-FIFA nationality.

No.	Pos.	Nation	Player
1	GK	MEX	Fabián Villaseñor
2	DF	ARG	Miguel Ángel Martínez
3	FW	MEX	Maleno Frías
4	DF	MEX	George Corral
5	DF	MEX	Omar Flores
6	MF	MEX	Gerardo Espinoza
7	DF	MEX	Yasser Corona
8	MF	MEX	Alan Zamora
9	FW	COL	Jhon Córdoba
10	MF	URU	Jorge Rodríguez
11	FW	COL	Luis Gabriel Rey
13	MF	MEX	Elgabry Rangel
14	MF	MEX	Luis Miguel Noriega
18	MF	MEX	Ricardo Esqueda
19	MF	MEX	Édgar Andrade

No.	Pos.	Nation	Player
20	FW	COL	Franco Arizala
21	MF	MEX	Gerardo Gómez
22	FW	USA	Gustavo Ruelas
23	GK	MEX	Édgar Hernández
24	DF	MEX	Diego Castellanos
25	FW	MEX	Armando Zamorano
26	MF	MEX	Jorge Zárate
28	MF	GUA	José Carlos Castillo
29	DF	MEX	Edwin Gerardo Villed
30	MF	MEX	Ricardo Antonio Zendejas
31	FW	MEX	David Beccera Cordova
35	FW	MEX	Jesús Castillo
-	DF	COL	Leiton Jiménez
-	DF	ARG	Cristian Trombetta

=== Regular season ===
Win Draw Loss

==== Apertura 2012 results ====
July 20, 2012 Round 1	Chiapas	0–4	UANL	Tuxtla Gutiérrez, Chiapas
19:30	M. Martínez (yellow card) 83'	Report	Pulido 6'; Juninho 14'; Lobos 35'; Viniegra 40'; Torres Nilo (yellow card) 77'	Stadium: Estadio Victor Manuel Reyna; Referee: Erim Ramírez

July 28, 2012 Round 2	América	4–2	Chiapas	Mexico City
17:00	Sambueza (yellow card) 26'; Benítez 43', 90'; Medina 49'; Molina (yellow card) 63'; A. López 79'	Report	Esqueda (yellow card) 1'; Rey 31'; Bedolla 51'	Stadium: Estadio Azteca; Referee: Jorge Antonio Pérez

August 4, 2012 Round 3	Monterrey	2–1	Chiapas	Monterrey, Nuevo León
19:00	Morales 4'; Cardozo 31', (yellow card) 61'; Meza (yellow card) 74'; Zavala (yellow card) 89'	Report	Esqueda (yellow card) 2', (goal) 21'; Rangel (yellow card) 24'; Rodríguez (yellow card) 63'	Stadium: Estadio Tecnológico; Referee: Miguel Ángel Ayala

August 10, 2012 Round 4	Chiapas	1–2	Atlante	Tuxtla Gutiérrez, Chiapas
19:30	Espinoza (yellow card) 43'; Bedolla (yellow card) 65'; Rey 76'	Report	I. Martínez (yellow card) 33'; O. Martínez (yellow card) 38'; Guerrero (yellow card) 50'; Paredes 56', 85'	Stadium: Estadio Victor Manuel Reyna; Referee: Víctor Bisguerra Mendiola

August 18, 2012 Round 5	Atlas	1–1	Chiapas	Guadalajara, Jalisco
21:00	Santana 39'; Ayala (yellow card) 77'	Report	Arizala 65'; Trujillo (yellow card) 77' (yellow-red card) 90+1'; Esqueda (yellow card) 90+3'	Stadium: Estadio Jalisco; Attendance: 13,750; Referee: César Arturo Ramos

August 24, 2012 Round 6	Chiapas	2–1	Querétaro	Tuxtla Gutiérrez, Chiapas
19:30	Esqueda (yellow card) 26'; Corral (yellow card) 50'; Rey 67'; Córdoba (yellow card) 70'; Arizala 88', (yellow card) 88'	Report	Enríquez (yellow card) 36'; García Arías (yellow card) 57'; Oviedo 62'; Cortés (red card) 90'	Stadium: Estadio Victor Manuel Reyna; Attendance: 7,244; Referee: Fernando Guerrero

August 31, 2012 Round 7	Tijuana	2–0	Chiapas	Tijuana, Baja California
17:30	Moreno 41' (pen.); Riascos 82', (yellow card) 83'	Report	Martínez (yellow card) 27'; Andrade (yellow card) 48'	Stadium: Estadio Caliente; Referee: Roberto García Orozco

September 14, 2012 Round 8	Chiapas	2–0	Toluca	Tuxtla Gutiérrez, Chiapas
19:30	Rodríguez 55', 78'	Report		Stadium: Estadio Victor Manuel Reyna; Referee: Marco Antonio Rodríguez

September 22, 2012 Round 9	Santos Laguna	0–0	Chiapas	Torreón, Coahuila
19:00	Escoboza (yellow card) 69'	Report		Stadium: Estadio Caliente; Attendance: 20,075; Referee: Francisco Chacón

September 28, 2012 Round 10	Chiapas	1–0	Cruz Azul	Tuxtla Gutiérrez, Chiapas
19:30	Rodríguez (yellow card) 26'; Rey (yellow card) 38'; Corral (yellow card) 54'; Perea 64' (o.g.); Córdoba (yellow card) 81'	Report	Maranhão (yellow card) 15'; Castro (yellow card) 45+'	Stadium: Estadio Victor Manuel Reyna; Attendance: 18,173; Referee: Jorge Antonio Pérez

October 4, 2012 Round 11	Morelia	1–1	Chiapas	Morelia, Michoacán
20:00	Montero 35'; Ramírez (yellow card) 37'; Álvarez (yellow card) 45+1'; Romero (yellow card) 49'; Olvera (yellow card) 69'	Report	Andrade 34'; Martínez (yellow card) 53'; Esqueda (yellow card) 75'	Stadium: Estadio Morelos; Attendance: 10,589; Referee: Óscar Macías

October 7, 2012 Round 12	Chiapas	4–0	San Luis	Tuxtla Gutiérrez, Chiapas
15:00	Rey 9', 26'; Córdoba 46', (yellow card) 68'; Arizala 94'	Report	Tréllez (yellow card) 65'; Paredes (yellow card) 69'; Velasco (yellow card) 75'	Stadium: Estadio Victor Manuel Reyna; Referee: Ricardo Arellano

October 14, 2012 Round 13	Guadalajara	1–1	Chiapas	Zapopan, Jalisco
17:00	Araujo (yellow card) 20'; Reynoso (yellow card) 24' (yellow-red card) 87'; Fabián (yellow card) 24'; Gallardo 41'	Report	Jiménez (yellow card) 45+1'; Rey (yellow card) 55', (goal) 66'; Corral (yellow card) 68'; Rodríguez (yellow card) 84'	Stadium: Estadio Omnilife; Attendance: 19,455; Referee: Miguel Ángel Flores

October 19, 2012 Round 14	Chiapas	2–0	Puebla	Tuxtla Gutiérrez, Chiapas
19:30	Arizala (yellow card) 35'; Jiménez 46'; Corral (yellow card) 56'; Rodríguez 90'	Report	Miranda (yellow card) 48'	Stadium: Estadio Victor Manuel Reyna; Attendance: 9,591; Referee: Miguel Ángel Ayala

October 26, 2012 Round 15	León	4–1	Chiapas	León, Guanajuato
21:15	Britos 5'; Vázquez (red card) 13'; Montes 28'; Burbano 51'; Pineda (yellow card) 52'; Peña 79'; González (yellow card) 82'	Report	Corral (yellow card) 17'; Martínez (red card) 20'; Rey 26' (pen.); Arizala (yellow card) 33' (yellow-red card) 84'; Andrade (yellow card) 78'	Stadium: Estadio León; Attendance: 20,710; Referee: Jorge Antonio Pérez

November 2, 2012 Round 16	Chiapas	3–0	UNAM	Tuxtla Gutiérrez, Chiapas
19:30	Andrade 14', 19'; Rey 42'	Report	M. Palacios (yellow card) 87'	Stadium: Estadio Victor Manuel Reyna; Attendance: 23,547; Referee: Óscar Macias

November 10, 2012 Round 17	Pachuca	2–1	Chiapas	Pachuca, Hidalgo
19:00	Castillo 44'; Hernández (yellow card) 82'; García 87'	Report	Martínez (yellow card) 10'; Corras (yellow card) 54'; Loroña 63'; Jiménez (yellow card) 79'	Stadium: Estadio Hidalgo; Attendance: 17,913; Referee: Luis Enrique Santander

=== Goalscorers ===
Position	Nation	Name	Goals scored
1.	(Colombia)	Luis Gabriel Rey	8
2.	(Mexico)	Edgar Andrade	3
2.	(Colombia)	Franco Arizala	3
2.	(Uruguay)	Jorge Rodríguez	3
5.	(Mexico)	Leonardo Bedolla	1
5.	(Colombia)	Jhon Córdoba	1
5.	(Mexico)	Ricardo Esqueda	1
5.	(Colombia)	Leiton Jiménez	1
5.	(Mexico)	Luis Guadalupe Loroña	1
5.		Own Goals	1
TOTAL			23

=== Results ===
==== Results summary ====
Overall								Home						Away					
Pld	W	D	L	GF	GA	GD	Pts	W	D	L	GF	GA	GD	W	D	L	GF	GA	GD
17	6	4	7	23	24	−1	22	6	0	2	15	7	+8	0	4	5	8	17	−9

Last updated: 10 November 2012.
Source: Apertura 2012 results

==== Results by round ====
Round	1	2	3	4	5	6	7	8	9	10	11	12	13	14	15	16	17
Ground	H	A	A	H	A	H	A	H	A	H	A	H	A	H	A	H	A
Result	L	L	L	L	D	W	L	W	D	W	D	W	D	W	L	W	L
Position	18	18	18	18	16	15	16	15	16	13	13	11	11	9	12	9	11

Updated to match(es) played on 11 November 2012. Source: Apertura 2012 results and mediotiempo.com
A = Away; H = Home; W = Win; D = Draw; L = Loss

== Apertura 2012 Copa MX ==
=== Group stage ===
Win Draw Loss

==== Apertura results ====
July 24, 2012 1	Chiapas	1–0	Necaxa	Tuxtla Gutiérrez, Chiapas
19:00	Bedolla (yellow card) 56'; Salazar 77'	Report	Cervantes (red card) 90+2'	Stadium: Estadio Victor Manuel Reyna; Referee: Fernando Guerrero

July 31, 2012 2	Necaxa	3–0	Chiapas	Aguascalientes, Aguascalientes
19:00	Gallardo (yellow card) 35'; Santoya 34', 38', 63'; Hernández (yellow card) 55'	Report	Córdoba (yellow card) 30'; Esqueda (yellow card) 76'	Stadium: Estadio Victoria; Referee: Jorge Luis Delgado

August 7, 2012 3	Pumas Morelos	2–0	Chiapas	Cuernavaca, Morelos
16:00	García (yellow card) 15'; Campos 37'; Rosales 50'	Report	Hernández (yellow card) 49'; Trujillo (yellow card) 70'	Stadium: Estadio Centenario; Attendance: 2,378; Referee: Carlos Manuel Martínez

August 21, 2012 4	Chiapas	1–1	Pumas Morelos	Tuxtla Gutiérrez, Chiapas
19:00	Noriega (yellow card) 21'; Trujillo (yellow card) 31', (goal) 44' (pen.)	Report	Peña (yellow card) 43'; Garay 45+2'; Barrón (yellow card) 63'; Gámez (yellow card) 83'	Stadium: Estadio Victor Manuel Reyna; Referee: Miguel Ángel Flores

August 28, 2012 5	San Luis	2–1	Chiapas	San Luis Potosí, San Luis Potosí
21:00	Paredes (yellow card) 12'; Cerda 14'; Ordaz 33'; Salazar (yellow card) 85'	Report	Zamora (yellow card) 3'; Zárate 34', (yellow card) 54'	Stadium: Estadio Alfonso Lastras; Attendance: 3,919; Referee: Antony Zanjuampa

September 19, 2012 6	Chiapas	1–1	San Luis	Tuxtla Gutiérrez, Chiapas
19:00	Corona 55'; Noriega (yellow card) 74'	Report	Villaluz 90+4'	Stadium: Estadio Victor Manuel Reyna; Referee: César Arturo Ramos

=== Goalscorers ===
Position	Nation	Name	Goals scored
1.	(Mexico)	Yasser Corona	1
1.	(Mexico)	Antonio Salazar	1
1.	(Mexico)	Mariano Trujillo	1
1.	(Mexico)	Jorge Zárate	1
TOTAL			4

=== Results ===
==== Results by round ====
Round	1	2	3	4	5	6
Ground	H	A	A	H	A	H
Result	W	L	L	D	L	D
Position	2	3	4	4	4	4

Updated to match(es) played on 19 September 2012. Source: Apertura results and mediotiempo.com
A = Away; H = Home; W = Win; D = Draw; L = Loss

== Torneo Clausura ==
=== Squad ===
Note: Flags indicate national team as defined under FIFA eligibility rules; some limited exceptions apply. Players may hold more than one non-FIFA nationality.

No.	Pos.	Nation	Player
1	GK	MEX	Fabián Villaseñor
2	DF	ARG	Miguel Ángel Martínez
3	DF	COL	Leiton Jiménez
4	DF	MEX	George Corral
5	DF	MEX	Omar Flores
6	MF	MEX	Gerardo Espinoza
7	MF	MEX	David Toledo
8	MF	MEX	Jorge Gastélum
9	FW	COL	Jhon Córdoba
10	MF	URU	Jorge Rodríguez
11	FW	MEX	Luis Gabriel Rey
13	MF	MEX	Elgabry Rangel
15	DF	MEX	Leonardo Bedolla
16	DF	MEX	Mariano Trujillo
17	MF	MEX	Armando Zamorano
18	DF	MEX	Ricardo Esqueda
19	MF	MEX	Édgar Andrade

No.	Pos.	Nation	Player
20	FW	COL	Franco Arizala
22	GK	MEX	Luis Manuel García
23	GK	MEX	Édgar Hernández
24	MF	MEX	David Andrade
25	DF	MEX	Cristian Ocaña
26	MF	MEX	Jorge Zárate
27	MF	MEX	Carlos Reyes
30	MF	MEX	Kevin Gutiérrez
31	DF	MEX	Eduardo Chávez
38	DF	MEX	Osiris Enríquez
41	FW	MEX	Luis Loroña
42	MF	MEX	Erick Rivera
44	MF	MEX	Eleazar Silva
48	MF	MEX	Pedro Hernández
50	FW	MEX	Diego Castellanos
62	FW	MEX	Óscar Hernández
68	MF	MEX	Daniel Galindo

=== Regular season ===
Win Draw Loss

==== Clausura 2013 results ====
January 5, 2013 Round 1	UANL	3–0	Chiapas	San Nicolás de los Garza, Nuevo León
19:00	Villa 50', 68', 86'; Juninho (yellow card) 79'	Report	Martínez (yellow card) 30'; Jiménez (yellow card) 32'; Zamorano (yellow card) 88'	Stadium: Estadio Universitario; Attendance: 41,380; Referee: Víctor Bisguerra Mendiola

January 11, 2013 Round 2	Chiapas	0–2	América	Tuxtla Gutiérrez, Chiapas
19:30	Martínez (yellow card) 63'; Esqueda (yellow card) 78'; Arizala (yellow card) 89'	Report	Sambueza 58'; Mosquera (yellow card) 72'; Benítez 67'; Mina (yellow card) 80'	Stadium: Estadio Victor Manuel Reyna; Attendance: 24,500; Referee: Jorge Antonio Pérez

January 18, 2013 Round 3	Chiapas	1–1	Monterrey	Tuxtla Gutiérrez, Chiapas
19:30	Arizala 77'; Rodríguez (red card) 90+1'	Report	de Nigris 14'	Stadium: Estadio Victor Manuel Reyna; Attendance: 10,214; Referee: Marco Antonio Rodríguez

January 27, 2013 Round 4	Atlante	4–3	Chiapas	Cancún, Quintana Roo
18:00	Larrivey 10', 14'; Maidana (yellow card) 39'; Amione (yellow card) 41'; Jiménez (yellow card) 52'; Ordaz 89'; Venegas 90+1'	Report	Hernández (yellow card) 16'; Gastélum (yellow card) 26' (yellow-red card) 63'; Martínez (yellow card) 36' (red card) 66'; Jiménez 56'; Loroña 65', 74'	Stadium: Estadio Andrés Quintana Roo; Attendance: 3,813; Referee: José Alfredo Peñaloza

February 1, 2013 Round 5	Chiapas	1–2	Atlas	Tuxtla Gutiérrez, Chiapas
19:30	Esqueda (yellow card) 23'; Rey 88' (pen.)	Report	Brizuela 10', (yellow card) 54'; Martín (yellow card) 66'; Cufré (yellow card) 73'; Barraza 82'; Razo (yellow card) 87'	Stadium: Estadio Victor Manuel Reyna; Attendance: 8,600; Referee: Miguel Ángel Flores

February 9, 2013 Round 6	Querétaro	1–1	Chiapas	Querétaro, Querétaro
17:00	Landín (yellow card) 23'; Escalante (yellow card) 62'; Escoto 83'	Report	P. Hernández (yellow card) 31'; Rodríguez 41'; É. Hernández (yellow card) 68'	Stadium: Estadio Corregidora; Attendance: 10,683; Referee: Erim Ramírez

February 15, 2013 Round 7	Chiapas	2–0	Tijuana	Tuxtla Gutiérrez, Chiapas
19:30	Rey 50' (pen.), 62'; Bedolla (yellow card) 67'; Jiménez (yellow card) 73'; Gastélum (yellow card) 77'; Córdoba (yellow card) 88'	Report	Castillo (yellow card) 6' (yellow-red card) 48'; Núñez (yellow card) 63'; Riascos (yellow card) 79'; Gandolfi (yellow card) 82'; Pellerano (yellow card) 90+2'	Stadium: Estadio Victor Manuel Reyna; Attendance: 10,551; Referee: Roberto García Orozco

February 24, 2013 Round 8	Toluca	2–1	Chiapas	Toluca, Estado de México
12:00	Lucas Silva (yellow card) 34', (goal) 47'; Sinha (yellow card) 67'; Santos 77'	Report	Rey 19'; Gastélum (yellow card) 58'; Andrade (yellow card) 88'	Stadium: Estadio Nemesio Díez; Attendance: 8,863; Referee: César Arturo Ramos

March 1, 2013 Round 9	Chiapas	1–3	Santos Laguna	Tuxtla Gutiérrez, Chiapas
19:30	Rey 16'; Arizala (yellow card) 39'	Report	Gómez 13', 20'; Peralta 17', (yellow card) 80'; Baloy (yellow card) 55'	Stadium: Estadio Victor Manuel Reyna; Attendance: 9,953; Referee: Jorge Isaac Rojas

March 9, 2013 Round 10	Cruz Azul	1–1	Chiapas	Benito Juárez, Mexico City
17:00	Bertolo 20'; A. Castro (yellow card) 48' (yellow-red card) 77'; Torrado (yellow card) 80'	Report	Corral (yellow card) 53'; Rodríguez (yellow card) 72'; Arizala 90'	Stadium: Estadio Azul; Attendance: 8,136; Referee: Fabricio Morales

March 15, 2013 Round 11	Chiapas	1–1	Morelia	Tuxtla Gutiérrez, Chiapas
19:30	Gastélum (yellow card) 39'; Rey 44' (pen.); Toledo (red card) 80'	Report	Rojas 10'; Rodríguez (yellow card) 41'	Stadium: Estadio Victor Manuel Reyna; Attendance: 7,752; Referee: José Alfredo Peñaloza

March 30, 2013 Round 12	San Luis	3–0	Chiapas	San Luis Potosí, San Luis Potosí
21:00	Cuevas 23' (pen.); Muñoz (yellow card) 32', (goal) 61'; Rodríguez (yellow card) 32'; Velasco (yellow card) 61'; Pérez 66'	Report	Jiménez (yellow card) 34' (yellow-red card) 90+2'; Andrade (yellow card) 37'; Gastélum (yellow card) 63'; Esqueda (yellow card) 85'	Stadium: Estadio Alfonso Lastras; Attendance: 21,387; Referee: Jorge Antonio Pérez

April 5, 2013 Round 13	Chiapas	3–2	Guadalajara	Tuxtla Gutiérrez, Chiapas
19:30	Rey 8'; Esqueda (yellow card) 18'; Loroña 39'; Andrade (yellow card) 69'; Arizala 80'	Report	Márquez 45+1', 64'; Sabah (yellow card) 66'; Sánchez (yellow card) 72'	Stadium: Estadio Victor Manuel Reyna; Attendance: 17,538; Referee: Fernando Guerrero

April 13, 2013 Round 14	Puebla	1–2	Chiapas	Puebla, Puebla
12:00	Orozco (yellow card) 44'; Beasley 69'; Lacerda (yellow card) 90+3'	Report	Loroña 13', (yellow card) 48'; Jiménez (yellow card) 39'; Bedolla (yellow card) 52'; Zamorano (yellow card) 76'; Rodríguez 85'	Stadium: Estadio Cuauhtémoc; Attendance: 17,149; Referee: Jorge Isaac Rojas

April 10, 2013 Round 15	Chiapas	2–2	León	Tuxtla Gutiérrez, Chiapas
19:30	Esqueda (yellow card) 13'; Bedolla (yellow card) 37'; Jiménez 50'; Rey 58'; Andrade (yellow card) 89'	Report	Márquez (yellow card) 13'; González (yellow card) 27'; Peña 61'; Hernández 90+3'	Stadium: Estadio Victor Manuel Reyna; Attendance: 9,552; Referee: José Alfredo Peñaloza

April 28, 2013 Round 16	UNAM	3–0	Chiapas	Coyoacán, Mexico City
12:00	Cortés 8', 88'; Ramírez 44'; Fuentes (yellow card) 74'	Report	Bedolla (yellow card) 87'	Stadium: Estadio Olímpico Universitario; Attendance: 19,034; Referee: Roberto García Orozco

May 3, 2013 Round 17	Chiapas	2–1	Pachuca	Tuxtla Gutiérrez, Chiapas
19:30	Esqueda 24'; Andrade (yellow card) 58'; Rey 90+1'	Report	Bueno 80'	Stadium: Estadio Victor Manuel Reyna; Referee: Miguel Ángel Ayala

Chiapas did not qualify to the Final Phase

=== Goalscorers ===
Position	Nation	Name	Goals scored
1.	(Colombia)	Luis Gabriel Rey	9
2.	(Mexico)	Luis Guadalupe Loroña	4
3.	(Colombia)	Franco Arizala	3
4.	(Colombia)	Leiton Jiménez	2
4.	(Uruguay)	Jorge Rodríguez	2
6.	(Mexico)	Ricardo Esqueda	1
TOTAL			21

=== Results ===
==== Results summary ====
Overall								Home						Away					
Pld	W	D	L	GF	GA	GD	Pts	W	D	L	GF	GA	GD	W	D	L	GF	GA	GD
17	4	5	8	21	32	−11	17	3	3	3	13	14	−1	1	2	5	8	18	−10

Last updated: 4 May 2013.
Source: Clausura 2013 results

==== Results by round ====
Round	1	2	3	4	5	6	7	8	9	10	11	12	13	14	15	16	17
Ground	A	H	H	A	H	A	H	A	H	A	H	A	H	A	H	A	H
Result	L	L	D	L	L	D	W	L	L	D	D	L	W	W	D	L	W
Position	18	18	17	18	18	18	17	17	17	16	15	16	15	15	14	15	14

Updated to match(es) played on 5 May 2013. Source: Clausura 2013 results and mediotiempo.com
A = Away; H = Home; W = Win; D = Draw; L = Loss

== Clausura 2013 Copa MX ==
=== Group stage ===
Win Draw Loss

==== Clausura results ====
January 15, 2013 1	Chiapas	3–2	Cruz Azul Hidalgo	Tuxtla Gutiérrez, Chiapas
19:00	Loroña 64'; Gastélum (yellow card) 72'; Castellanos 74'; Trujillo 82'	Report	Wbias 25'; Galván 88'	Stadium: Estadio Victor Manuel Reyna; Attendance: 2,469; Referee: Miguel Ángel Chacón

January 23, 2013 2	Cruz Azul Hidalgo	0–0	Chiapas	Ciudad Cooperativa Cruz Azul, Hidalgo
15:00	Hütt (yellow card) 9'; Hernández (yellow card) 59'	Report	Loroña (yellow card) 34'; Chávez (yellow card) 59'; Rangel (yellow card) 62'; Castellanos (yellow card) 86'	Stadium: Estadio 10 de Diciembre; Attendance: 2,375; Referee: Mauricio Martínez Figueroa

February 12, 2013 3	La Piedad	0–1	Chiapas	La Piedad, Michoacán
15:00	Tafolla (yellow card) 40'	Report	Rivera (yellow card) 38'; Trujillo (yellow card) 66'; Hernández (yellow card) 76'; Zárate 85'; Rangel (yellow card) 90+2'	Stadium: Estadio Juan N. López; Referee: Emerson Gustavo Zamora

February 21, 2013 4	Chiapas	0–0	La Piedad	Tuxtla Gutiérrez, Chiapas
19:00	Rivera (yellow card) 72'	Report	Rincon (yellow card) 57'	Stadium: Estadio Victor Manuel Reyna; Attendance: 7,847; Referee: Fabricio Morales.

February 26, 2013 5	San Luis	1–1	Chiapas	San Luis Potosí, San Luis Potosí
21:00	Valdez (yellow card) 35'; García 53'	Report	Castellanos (yellow card) 44'; D. Andrade 81'	Stadium: Estadio Alfonso Lastras; Referee: Oscar Macías Romo

March 6, 2013 6	Chiapas	1–0	San Luis	Tuxtla Gutiérrez, Chiapas
21:00	Córdoba 66'; Trujillo (yellow card) 71'; P. Hernández (yellow card) 84'	Report	Valdez (red card) 59'	Stadium: Estadio Victor Manuel Reyna; Attendance: 7,977; Referee: Antony Zanjuampa

=== Knockout stage ===
March 12, 2013 Quarter-finals	Cruz Azul	1–0	Chiapas	Benito Juárez, Mexico City
19:00	Barrera (yellow card) 71'; Gutiérrez 72' (pen.); Vela (yellow card) 77'	Report	Corral (yellow card) 44'; Zamorano (yellow card) 81'	Stadium: Estadio Azul; Referee: Jorge Antonio Pérez

=== Goalscorers ===
Position	Nation	Name	Goals scored
1.	(Mexico)	Diego Castellanos	2
2.	(Colombia)	Jhon Córdoba	1
2.	(Mexico)	Luis Loroña	1
2.	(Mexico)	Mariano Trujillo	1
TOTAL			5

=== Results by round ===
Round	1	2	3	4	5	6
Ground	H	A	A	H	A	H
Result	W	D	W	D	D	W
Position	2	2	2	1	1	1

Updated to match(es) played on 6 March 2013. Source: Clausura results and mediotiempo.com
A = Away; H = Home; W = Win; D = Draw; L = Loss
