= Copa Mesoamericana 2011 =

2011 Copa Mesoamericana
Tournament details
- Host country: Mexico
- Dates: 28–30 December 2011
- Teams: 4 (from 1 confederation)
- Venue: 1 (in 1 host city)

Final positions
- Champions: (Mexico) Chiapas (1st title)
- Runners-up: (El Salvador) Isidro Metapán
- Third place: (Guatemala) Comunicaciones
- Fourth place: (Guatemala) Xelajú

Tournament statistics
- Matches played: 4
- Goals scored: 15 (3.75 per match)
- Top scorer(s): (Colombia) Jackson Martínez (5 goals)

The Copa Mesoamericana 2011 was a football tournament that was played from 28 to 30 December 2011. It was the first edition of the Copa Mesoamericana. played between teams of the south of Mexico and of Central America. It was hosted in Tapachula, Chiapas.

The tournament was won by Mexican club Chiapas, who defeated Salvadoran club Isidro Metapán 4–1 in the final.

== Matches ==
Semifinals
1	(Guatemala) Xelajú	0
4	(El Salvador) Isidro Metapán	3
3	(Mexico) Chiapas	3
2	(Guatemala) Comunicaciones	1

Final
(El Salvador) Isidro Metapán	1
(Mexico) Chiapas	4

=== Semifinals ===
December 28, 2011
Semifinals

Xelajú (Guatemala)	0–3	(El Salvador) Isidro Metapán
	Report	Blanco 4', 15'; Pacheco 61'

December 28, 2011
Semifinals

Chiapas (Mexico)	3–1	(Guatemala) Comunicaciones
M. Martínez 43'; J. Martínez 56', 89'	Report	Medina 27'

=== Third Place ===
December 30, 2011
Third Place

Xelajú (Guatemala)	1–2	(Guatemala) Comunicaciones
J. Ruiz 30'	Report	Ciani 6', 77'

=== Final ===
December 30, 2011
Final

Chiapas (Mexico)	4–1	(El Salvador) Isidro Metapán
J. Martínez 7', 11', 65'; Corona 44'	Report	Pacheco 76'

Copa Mesoamericana 2011 Winners
(Mexico) Chiapas
1st Title
