= Hilario Tristán =

Mexican footballer (born 1989)

Personal information
- Full name: Hilario Tristán Martínez
- Date of birth: 22 September 1989 (age 37)
- Place of birth: Monterrey, Nuevo León, Mexico
- Height: 1.75 m (5 ft 9 in)
- Positions: Midfielder; winger

Senior career*
Years	Team	Apps	(Gls)
2007–2018	UANL (youth)	4	(0)
2009–2010	→ Chiapas under-20 (loan)	1	(0)
2010	→ Correcaminos UAT (loan)	7	(0)
2011–2012	→ Loros UdeC (loan)	8	(3)
2012–2013	→ Reynosa (loan)	19	(9)
2013–2017	→ Murciélagos (loan)	71	(19)
2017–2018	→ Cimarrones de Sonora (loan)	2	(0)
2018	Sonsonate	17	(0)
- * Club domestic league appearances and goals

Hilario Tristán Martínez (born 22 September 1989) is a former Mexican professional footballer.

== Club career ==
=== Sonsonate ===
Tristán signed with Sonsonate of the Salvadoran Primera División for the Apertura 2018 tournament. He left the club in December 2018.
