= Christian Armas =

Mexican footballer (born 1986)

Personal information
- Full name: Christian Michel Armas Curiel
- Date of birth: January 13, 1986 (age 40)
- Place of birth: Tepic, Nayarit, Mexico
- Height: 1.79 m (5 ft 10 1/2 in)
- Position: Defender

Senior career*
Years	Team	Apps	(Gls)
2005–2006	Chivas de Guadalajara	9	(0)
2006–2010	Jaguares	41	(0)
2010	Peñarol La Mesilla		
- * Club domestic league appearances and goals as of June 1, 2008

Christian Michel Armas Curiel (born January 13, 1986) is a Mexican former professional footballer who played as a defender.
