= Diego Jiménez (footballer, born 1986) =

Mexican footballer

Personal information
- Full name: Diego Octavio Jiménez Villa
- Date of birth: 7 April 1986 (age 40)
- Place of birth: Tepatitlán, Jalisco, Mexico
- Height: 6 ft 0 in (1.83 m)
- Position: Defender

Youth career
- 2002–2004: Tecos UAG

Senior career*
| Years | Team | Apps | (Gls) |
| 2004–2005 | Tecomán | 19 | (0) |
| 2005–2017 | Tecos | 109 | (3) |
| 2008 | → New York Red Bulls (loan) | 6 | (0) |
| 2011–2012 | → Morelia (loan) | 2 | (0) |
| 2013 | → Merida (loan) | 7 | (0) |
- * Club domestic league appearances and goals as of 5 May 2013

Diego Octavio Jiménez Villa (Note: In this Spanish name, the first or paternal surname is Jiménez and the second or maternal family name is Villa.) (born 7 April 1986 in Tepatitlán, Jalisco) is a Mexican former footballer who played as defender for Estudiantes Tecos of Ascenso MX. He is known as "Tepa".

== Club career ==
His career started with the Estudiantes reserve side, appearing in 29 matches and scoring one goal. He then went to Tecos 2A side, where he anchored the back line during the 2004 Clausura appearing in all 17 matches. His play in 2005 with Tecomán drew the attention of the Tecos UAG first team and Jiménez was quickly called up by Tecos. He debuted with Tecos in the Mexican First Division during the 2005 Apertura and made 11 appearances including seven starts.

After a lengthy pursuit for his signature, Jiménez was loaned to New York Red Bulls of Major League Soccer during the July 2008 transfer window by UAG Tecos. After signing it took a while for Jiménez to establish himself at the club. Suspensions and ineffective play by the team's starting central defenders, opened up an opportunity for Diego. Jiménez started both legs of the club's improbable 4-1 aggregate victory over defending champion Houston Dynamo in the 2008 MLS Playoffs, leading the backline in negating one of the league's most potent attacks. He then helped New York reach the 2008 MLS Cup by defeating Real Salt Lake 1–0 in Utah.

== National team ==
Jiménez was a starter on Mexico's Under-21 and Under-20 National Team, including playing in the Touloun Youth Tournament in France in 2006.

== Statistics ==
| League | Appearances | Goals |
|---|---|---|
| Liga MX | 99 | 3 |
| Major League Soccer | 10 | 0 |
| Ascenso MX | 10 | 2 |

== Honours ==
New York Red Bulls

- Major League Soccer Western Conference Championship: 2008
