= Marvin Cabrera =

Mexican footballer and manager (born 1980)

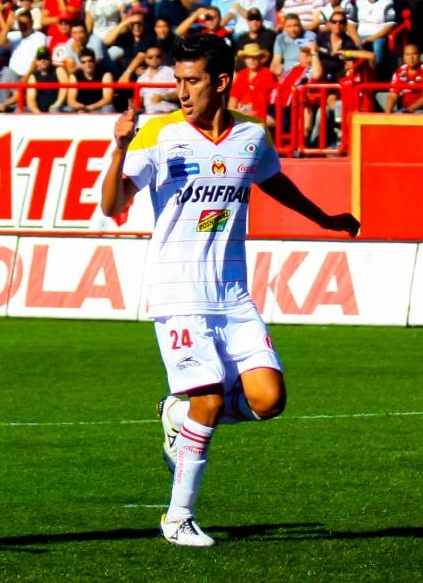
- Cabrera playing for Morelia

Personal information
- Full name: Marvin Gabriel Cabrera Ibarra
- Date of birth: May 1, 1980 (age 46)
- Place of birth: Mexico City, Mexico
- Height: 1.75 m (5 ft 9 in)
- Position: Right-back

Team information
- Current team: Mexico U15 (Manager)

Senior career*
Years	Team	Apps	(Gls)
2000–2005	Cruz Azul	76	(6)
2005–2008	Pachuca	93	(1)
2008–2013	Morelia	90	(1)
2010–2011	→ Chiapas (loan)	22	(0)
2012–2013	→ Toluca (loan)	23	(0)
2014	UAT	2	(0)
Total		306	(8)

Managerial career
- 2014–15: Toluca U17 (Assistant coach)
- 2015–16: Toluca U17
- 2016–17: Toluca U20
- 2018: Toluca Premier
- 2018–2019: Atlante (Assistant)
- 2020–2023: Guatemala U17
- 2023–2025: Guatemala U20
- 2026–: Mexico U15
- * Club domestic league appearances and goals

Marvin Gabriel Cabrera Ibarra (born 1 May 1980) is a Mexican former professional footballer who played as a right-back. He is the current head coach for the Guatemala under-17 national team.

== Honours ==
Pachuca

- Mexican Primera División: Clausura 2006, Clausura 2007
- CONCACAF Champions' Cup: 2007, 2008
- Copa Sudamericana: 2006
- North American SuperLiga: 2007
