= Jorge Gastélum =

Mexican footballer (born 1988)

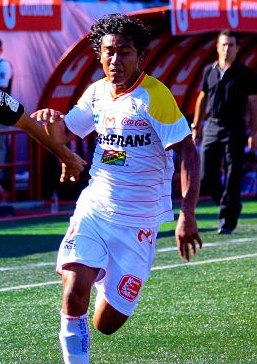
- Gastélum playing for Morelia

Personal information
- Full name: Jorge Kalú Gastélum Ocampo
- Date of birth: February 28, 1988 (age 38)
- Place of birth: Ciudad Obregón, Mexico
- Height: 1.73 m (5 ft 8 in)
- Position: Midfielder

Youth career
- 2007–2009: Morelia

Senior career*
Years	Team	Apps	(Gls)
2009–2012	Morelia	101	(3)
2012	→ Puebla (loan)	16	(0)
2013	Chiapas	13	(0)
2013	Pachuca	0	(0)
2014	Atlas	6	(0)
2014–2015	Querétaro	1	(0)
2015–2016	Coras de Tepic	25	(1)
2016–2017	Cimarrones de Sonora	34	(0)
- * Club domestic league appearances and goals

Jorge Kalú Gastélum Ocampo (born February 28, 1988) is a Mexican former footballer. He last played for Cimarrones of the Ascenso MX.

== Club career ==
A native of the Plano Oriente colonia in Ciudad Obregón, Gastélum began his career with the Pioneros de Ciudad Obregón.

Gastélum subsequently joined Monarcas Morelia, initially playing with their affiliate team in Primera División A. Gastélum made his professional debut with the Monarcas senior team on 14 March 2008 against Club Necaxa. He quickly became a regular starter and was named the Clausura 2009 best rookie of the tournament.

== Honours ==
=== Individual ===
- Best Rookie of the tournament: Primera División de México Clausura 2009
