= Gerardo Ruiz =

Mexican footballer (born 1985)

Gerardo Ruíz
Personal information
- Full name: Gerardo Daniel Ruíz Barragán
- Date of birth: 5 September 1985 (age 41)
- Place of birth: Mexico City, Mexico
- Height: 1.89 m (6 ft 2 in)
- Position: Goalkeeper

Team information
- Current team: Jaiba Brava
- Number: 13

Senior career*
Years	Team	Apps	(Gls)
2006–2019	Atlante	168	(9)
2010–2012	→ Jaguares (loan)	3	(0)
2019–2021	Querétaro	6	(0)
2022–2024	Tlaxcala	76	(2)
2024–	Jaiba Brava	82	(0)
- * Club domestic league appearances and goals as of 16 September 2026

Gerardo Daniel Ruíz Barragán (Note: In this Spanish name, the first or paternal surname is Ruíz and the second or maternal family name is Barragán.) (born 5 September 1985) is a Mexican professional footballer who plays as a goalkeeper for Liga de Expansión MX club Jaiba Brava.

== Honours ==
- Liga MX Best Liga de Expansión MX Player: 2025–26
