= Jesús Castillo (Mexican footballer) =

Mexican footballer (born 1988)

Personal information
- Full name: Jesús Castillo Ugarte
- Date of birth: 16 May 1988 (age 38)
- Place of birth: Huetamo, Michoacán, Mexico
- Height: 1.70 m (5 ft 7 in)
- Position: Defender

Senior career*
Years	Team	Apps	(Gls)
2007–2015	Monarcas Morelia	2	(0)
2009–2010	→ Mérida (loan)		
2010–2011	→ Toros Neza (loan)		
2011–2012	→ Chiapas (loan)	12	(0)
2013	→ Pumas Morelos (loan)	5	(0)
2014	→ Atlético San Luis (loan)	1	(0)
2014	→ Veracruz (loan)	0	(0)
2015	→ Celaya (loan)	4	(0)
- * Club domestic league appearances and goals as of 25 August 2012

Jesús Castillo Ugarte (born 16 May 1988) is a former defender who last played for the Celaya on loan from Monarcas Morelia, in the Ascenso MX.
