= Omar Flores =

Mexican footballer (born 1979)

Personal information
- Full name: Omar Alejandro Flores Serrano
- Date of birth: 6 May 1979 (age 47)
- Place of birth: Acapulco, Guerrero, Mexico
- Height: 1.85 m (6 ft 1 in)
- Position: Defender

Team information
- Current team: Atlas (Assistant)

Senior career*
Years	Team	Apps	(Gls)
2000–2002	Atlas	23	(1)
2002	León	14	(0)
2003	Querétaro	8	(0)
2003–2008	Atlas	37	(2)
2009–2013	Chiapas	87	(1)
2013	Lobos BUAP	7	(0)
2014	Ballenas Galeana	4	(0)

Managerial career
- 2018–2022: Atlas Reserves and Academy
- 2020: Atlas (Interim)
- 2023–: Atlas (Assistant)
- 2023: Atlas (Interim)
- 2026: Atlas (Interim)
- * Club domestic league appearances and goals as of 5 February 2014

Omar Alejandro Flores Serrano (born 6 May 1979) is a Mexican former professional footballer who played as a defender and last played for Ballenas Galeana in the Ascenso MX.

Flores made his Mexican league debut for Atlas, on 11 March 2000 against Toluca.
