= Christian Valdez =

Mexican footballer (born 1984)

Personal information
- Full name: Christian de Jesús Valdez Loaiza
- Date of birth: 5 May 1984 (age 42)
- Place of birth: Mazatlán, Sinaloa, Mexico
- Height: 1.72 m (5 ft 8 in)
- Position: Midfielder

Senior career*
Years	Team	Apps	(Gls)
2004–2008	Atlas	177	(8)
2009–2011	Chiapas	116	(3)
2012	→ Morelia (loan)	34	(1)
2013–2015	Morelia	78	(2)
2016	→ Puebla (loan)	15	(3)
2016–2017	→ León (loan)	21	(0)
2017	→ Veracruz (loan)	13	(1)
2018–2019	Leones Negros UdeG	37	(4)
2020	Jaguares de Jalisco	0	(0)
- * Club domestic league appearances and goals as of 6 February 2020

Christian de Jesús Valdez Loaiza (born 5 May 1984) is a former Mexican professional footballer who last played as a midfielder for Jaguares de Jalisco.

== Career ==
=== Puebla ===
In December 2015, Puebla announced that Valdez would be joining the team on loan from Morelia.

== Honours ==
Morelia

- Copa MX: Apertura 2013
- Supercopa MX: 2014
