= Yasser Corona =

Mexican footballer (born 1987)

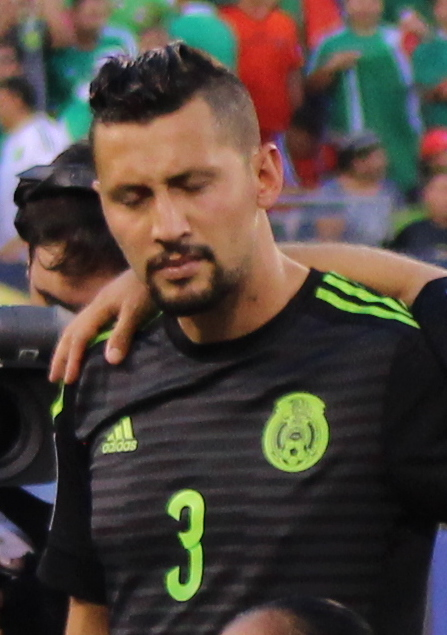
- Corona with Mexico in 2015

Personal information
- Full name: Yasser Anwar Corona Delgado
- Date of birth: 28 July 1987 (age 39)
- Place of birth: Tepic, Nayarit, Mexico
- Height: 1.84 m (6 ft 1/2 in)
- Position: Defender

Team information
- Current team: Mexico U16 (Manager); Mexico U23 (Assistant)

Youth career
- Morelia

Senior career*
Years	Team	Apps	(Gls)
2006–2007	Morelia Primera A	9	(1)
2006–2012	Morelia	25	(1)
2007–2009	→ Mérida FC (loan)	16	(0)
2009–2010	→ Chiapas (loan)	27	(1)
2010–2011	→ Puebla (loan)	34	(2)
2012–2013	Chiapas	10	(1)
2013	→ San Luis (loan)	15	(1)
2013–2016	Querétaro	84	(7)
2016–2018	Tijuana	17	(1)
Total		246	(15)

International career
2015–2016	Mexico	7	(0)

Managerial career
- 2018–2019: Tijuana Reserves and Academy
- 2022–2023: Mexico U18
- 2022: Mexico U20 (Assistant)
- 2022: Mexico U17 (women) (Interim)
- 2023–2024: Mexico U17 (Assistant)
- 2024–2025: Mexico U15
- 2025: Mexico U20 (Assistant)
- 2025–: Mexico U16
- 2025–2026: Mexico U21 (Assistant)
- 2026–: Mexico U23 (Assistant)
Medal record
Men's football
Representing Mexico
CONCACAF Gold Cup
Winner	2015 United States–Canada	Team
- * Club domestic league appearances and goals

Yasser Anwar Corona Delgado (born 28 July 1987) is a Mexican former professional footballer and current manager of the Mexico national under-18 team.

== Career ==
Corona was born in Tepic. He started his Primera career with Morelia, and was signed by Chiapas on 16 May 2010, having made 24 Primera appearances for Chiapas.

He announced his retirement on April 30, 2018, because of an injury that occurred in 2017.

== Career statistics ==
=== International ===
As of match played 7 September 2016

National team	Year	Apps	Goals
Mexico	2015	2	0
Mexico	2016	5	0
Total		7	0

== Honours ==
Mexico

- CONCACAF Gold Cup: 2015
