= Jackson Martínez =

Colombian footballer (born 1986)

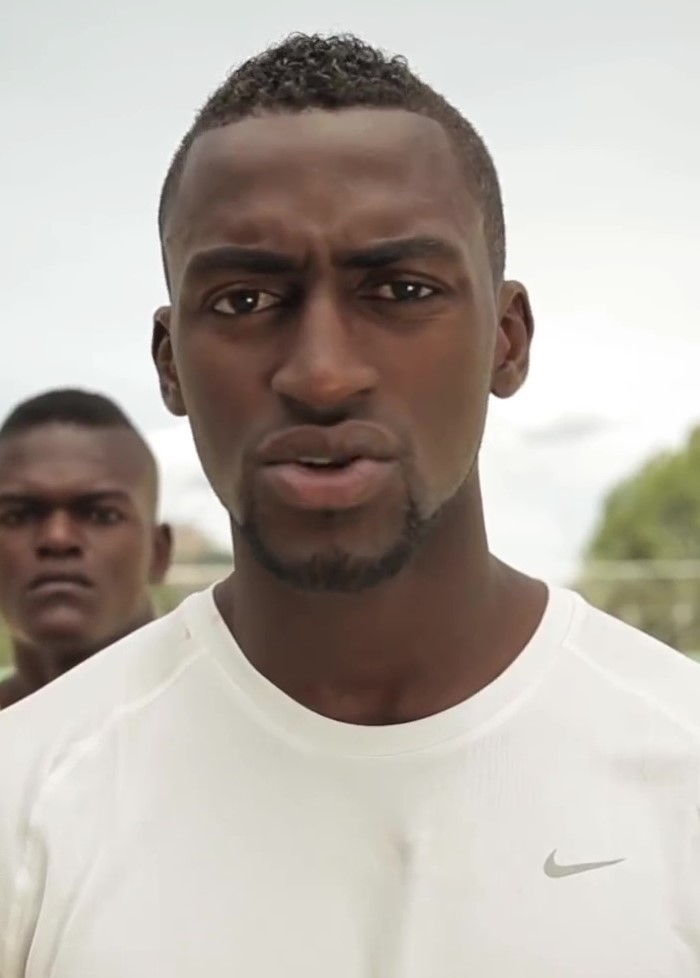
- Martínez in 2014

Personal information
- Full name: Jackson Arley Martínez Valencia
- Date of birth: 3 October 1986 (age 40)
- Place of birth: Quibdó, Colombia
- Height: 1.85 m (6 ft 1 in)
- Position: Forward

Team information
- Current team: Independiente Medellín
- Number: 15

Youth career
- 2001–2004: Independiente Medellín

Senior career*
Years	Team	Apps	(Gls)
2004–2009	Independiente Medellín	106	(41)
2009–2012	Chiapas	64	(33)
2012–2015	Porto	90	(67)
2015–2016	Atlético Madrid	15	(2)
2016–2019	Guangzhou Evergrande	10	(4)
2018–2019	→ Portimonense (loan)	27	(9)
2019–2020	Portimonense	24	(1)
2026–	Independiente Medellín	1	(1)
Total		371	(168)

International career
2009–2015	Colombia	40	(9)
- * Club domestic league appearances and goals

Jackson Arley Martínez Valencia (locally [ˈɟʝaksom maɾˈtines]; (Note: In isolation, Jackson is pronounced [ˈɟʝakson].) born 3 October 1986) is a Colombian professional footballer who plays as a striker for Colombian Primera A team Independiente Medellín.

Martínez began his professional career with Independiente Medellín, where he emerged as one of Colombia's leading forwards. He transferred to Mexican club Jaguares de Chiapas in January 2010, where he spent three seasons before moving to Portuguese side Porto. During his tenure at Porto, he established himself as one of the most prolific strikers in European football, finishing as the Primeira Liga's leading goalscorer in each of his three seasons with the club. Following a brief spell with Atlético Madrid, Martínez joined Chinese club Guangzhou Evergrande. A serious ankle injury sustained in late 2016 sidelined him for nearly two years and significantly affected the remainder of his career. He played one final season with Portimonense in Portugal before concluding his professional playing career in 2020. Martínez made an unexpected return to football in 2026 with his boyhood club, Independiente Medellín.

Martínez represented Colombia 40 times between 2009 and 2015, scoring nine goals. He played for the national team at the Copa América in 2011 and 2015, as well as the 2014 FIFA World Cup, where he scored two goals against Japan.

== Club career ==
=== Independiente Medellín ===
Born in Quibdó in the Chocó Department, Martínez joined Independiente Medellín's youth academy in 2001 until being called up to the first team for the 2004 Finalización. He made his debut on 3 October 2004, his 18th birthday, in a 2–2 draw against Junior. His first professional goal came roughly a month later in a 1–1 draw against Deportivo Pereira on 11 November. This was the last matchday of the regular season and his goal sealed Medellin's qualification into the playoffs.

With three goals in the Finalizacion playoffs, Martinez looked like he had a bright future ahead, but the following seasons were very slow-paced. From 2005 to 2007, he scored 12 goals, only 2 per tournament. But the 2008 season was his breakthrough season under manager Santiago Escobar, where he scored 11 goals as Medellin finished runner-up in December 2008 to América de Cali.

In January 2009, Martinez scored his first career hat-trick in a 4–0 victory against Peñarol in the 2009 Copa Libertadores first stage. Martinez began the 2009 Apertura campaign in great form, scoring 4 goals in 4 matches. However, he suffered an injury in March 2009 before a Copa Libertadores match against America de Cali, which saw him miss the rest of the 2009 Apertura campaign, as Medellin had a rough campaign and finished in last place. Despite this setback, he bounced back and was the top goalscorer of the 2009 Torneo Finalizacion with 18 goals, including braces against Real Cartagena, América de Cali, Atlético Huila, and Envigado, while leading El Poderoso to its fifth league title with a goal in each leg of the finals against Huila.

=== Chiapas ===
Martínez attracted interest from South Korean club Ulsan Hyundai as well as Argentine clubs San Lorenzo de Almagro and Racing Avellaneda. He initially signed a pre-contract with Ulsan Hyundai, but the transfer eventually fell through. As a result, Martínez was eventually signed by Chiapas from the Liga MX on a three-year contract for an undisclosed fee in January 2010.

He scored his first two goals with the club on 30 January in a 2–2 draw against Tigres UANL. Two weeks later, he scored against Pachuca, and then scored three in the next three games. He ended his first season with the club, the 2010 Torneo Bicentenario, with nine goals, placing him fourth in the top scorer's table. In August 2010, he had an ankle operation and was ruled out for a month. In the following season, the 2010 Apertura, he didn't perform well, only scoring two in fourteen appearances, but scored a match winner against Atlas in the penultimate matchday to give Chiapas a spot in the playoffs, where they were eliminated by eventual champions Santos Laguna.

In the 2011 Clausura, Martinez missed most of the season due to an injury he suffered in the Copa Libertadores match against Alianza Lima on 27 January, which ruled him out for almost three months. In his return on 30 April, he scored a brace in a 4–1 victory against Querétaro, but his team finished bottom of the table. However, in the Copa Libertadores, Chiapas had much better form and Martínez was a key player for them, scoring in both legs of the round of 16 encounter against Colombian club Junior to help his team go through on away goals. In the first leg at Estadio Víctor Manuel Reyna, he scored in a 1–1 draw, and then scored a double in the second leg, despite being shown a red card during the 3–3 draw in Barranquilla. Chiapas were eventually eliminated by Paraguayan side Cerro Porteño in the quarter finals, with the Colombian playing in the second leg.

In the Apertura 2012 season, he scored eight goals, including braces against San Luis and Pumas UNAM, and added to his tally by scoring once in each leg of the playoffs against Santos, but Chiapas were eliminated. Martínez was named captain of the squad at the beginning of the Clausura 2012 season, where he scored eight goals, with two braces again, this time in victories against Atlas and Querétaro. In the playoffs, Chiapas were paired up with Santos again, and Martinez scored a brace in the first leg, but his team were not able to get revenge and were eliminated by Santos again for the third time in eighteen months. At the end of the season, many European clubs were interested in the player, like Liverpool.

=== Porto ===
==== 2012–13 season ====
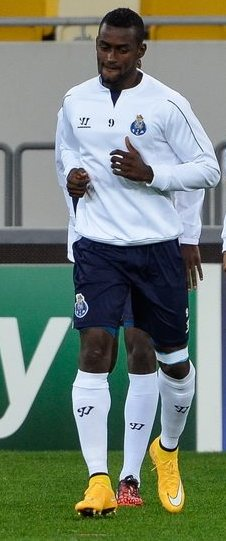
Martínez training before a match with Porto.

On 7 July 2012, Porto announced that they had signed Martínez on a four-year contract worth €8.8 million, in addition to setting a €40 million release clause. On 11 August, he played his first competitive match in the 2012 Supertaça against Académica de Coimbra, where he scored his first goal for the club, a match winning goal in the 90th minute. He was subsequently named as the man of the match for his performance in which he won his first title in Portugal.

Martínez scored his first league goal on 25 August with a Panenka penalty against Vitória de Guimarães, with Porto winning the game 4–0. On 22 September against Beira-Mar, he scored a bicycle kick from a chipped pass by fellow countryman James Rodríguez. Against rivals Sporting, he scored a back-heel volley in a 2–0 win. In the Champions League group stage on 24 October, Martínez scored his first two goals in European competitions, during a match which ended in a 3–2 victory for Porto against Dynamo Kyiv. Martínez continued his goal scoring streak in a 2–1 victory over Estoril on 28 October, assisting Silvestre Varela and scoring the game winner five minutes later. On 2 November, he scored two more goals in a 5–0 victory against Marítimo. He was named the SJPF Player of the Month for October and November. In December, Spanish sports newspaper Marca ranked him number 8 in a list of the Top 10 South American players of 2012.

Martínez scored five goals in January 2013: the only goal against Nacional on 5 January, in O Clássico against rivals Benfica on 13 January, a double ten days later in a 3–0 away victory against Vitoria Setubal, and against Gil Vicente on 28 January. By the halfway point of the league season, he had scored 14 goals in the first 15 league games, surpassing Falcao's numbers of 10 goals in 14 games. On 2 February, he scored a hat-trick against Vitória de Guimarães, which included two headers, making it his first hat-trick for Porto. He scored a brace on 23 February, including a penalty and a volley, to help Porto turn around a 0–1 deficit into a 2–1 victory against Rio Ave at Estádio do Dragão. He was named the February SJPF Player of the Month. In the final match of the league season against Paços de Ferreira, Martínez sealed the 2–0 victory after scoring the second goal and assuring Porto's third consecutive league title, undefeated and one point ahead of rivals Benfica. The goal also marked his 26th goal in the league, securing him the Bola da Prata. Following his debut season in Europe, ESPN noted Martínez as one of the best signings for the 2012–13 season.

==== 2013–14 season ====
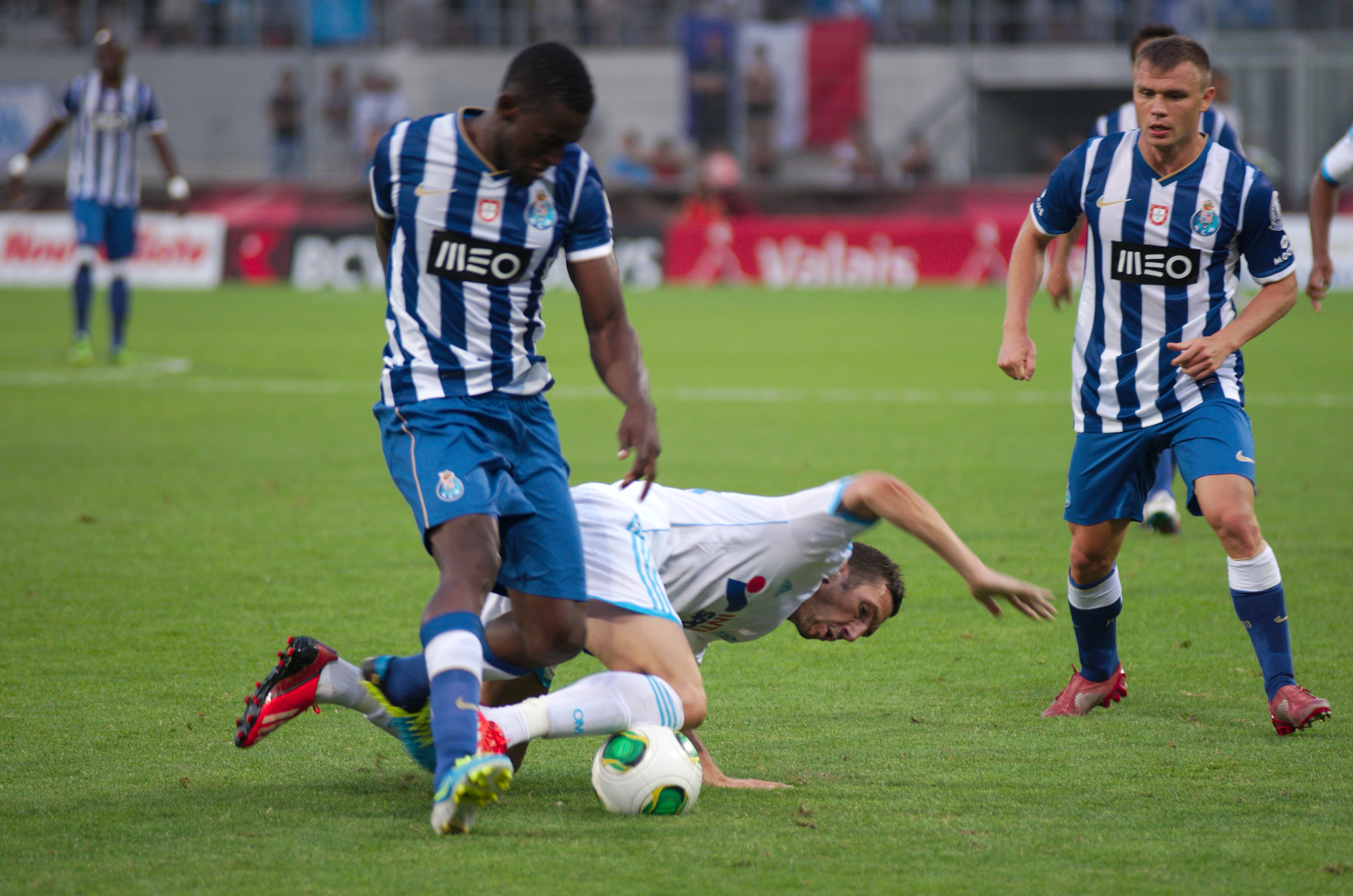
Martínez battling for possession in July 2013.

In the 2013 Supertaça Cândido de Oliveira, Martínez scored the second goal in a 3–0 victory against Vitória de Guimarães at the Estádio Municipal de Aveiro, claiming his second Portuguese Supercup in a row.

In the opening league match against Vitória de Setúbal on 18 August, Martínez scored the third goal in a 3–1 win. He continued the season in excellent form, adding four more goals in the next four matchdays. On 6 October, he scored a double against recently promoted Arouca in a win by the same score. He scored the only goal of the game in the Europa League round of 16 first leg against Napoli on 13 March, and Porto eventually qualified to the next round by winning 3–2 on aggregate. On 19 January 2014, Martínez scored his 50th goal in all competitions for Porto in a 3–0 win over Vitória. On 6 April, he scored a double, including a penalty and an assist, in a 3–1 victory against Académica. He ended up being the league's top scorer for the second consecutive season with 20 goals, becoming the first player to be top scorer for two consecutive seasons since Mario Jardel from 1997 to 2000 in the process.

==== 2014–15 season ====
After the 2014 World Cup, Martinez was linked with several Premier League clubs, Valencia, and Napoli. However, in August 2014, he extended his contract with Porto until 2017. On 30 September, he came on as a substitute in a Champions League group stage match away to Shakhtar Donetsk, and his team was trailing 2–0 to the Ukrainian hosts at the 85th minute. He scored two goals in four minutes; in the 89th minute, he scored a penalty and then equalised in added time to level the scoreline at 2–2, which completed a comeback that was dubbed as "stunning" and "remarkable" by UEFA. On 5 November, he opened the scoring in a 2–0 away victory against Athletic Bilbao, which qualified Porto to the round of sixteen. Martinez was voted Player of the Month for December 2014 and January 2015.

On 6 March 2015, he suffered a calf muscle tear in a league match against Braga, which caused him to be ruled out for a month and miss six matches. His return from injury came in the Champions League quarter-final first leg on 15 April 2015 against Bayern Munich, where he scored the last goal in a 3–1 victory and won the penalty that Ricardo Quaresma scored for the opening goal after being fouled by goalkeeper Manuel Neuer. Martínez netted again in the second leg six days later, heading a consolation from Héctor Herrera's cross as Porto lost 1–6 at the Allianz Arena, thus being eliminated from the competition. On 10 May, Martinez scored a double, the second being a spectacular bicycle kick, in a 2–0 victory against Gil Vicente. He ended the 2014–15 campaign with 21 goals and won the golden boot award for the third consecutive time.

=== Atlético Madrid ===
Martínez was linked heavily with Arsenal, Milan, and other European clubs again following his departure from Porto, but on 27 June 2015, he confirmed that he was moving to Spanish side Atlético Madrid. Four days later, it was announced on Porto's official website that Atlético were willing to pay the full €35 million release fee for the Colombian player. On 15 July, Atlético officially announced the transfer, and he signed a four-year contract running until 2019. He was officially presented at the Vicente Calderón Stadium on 26 July in front of around 10,000 people.

Martínez made his La Liga debut on 22 August, being substituted after an hour for Fernando Torres in a 1–0 home win over Las Palmas. A week later, Martínez came off the bench and scored his first goal for Atlético in a 3–0 victory over Sevilla. However, after only scoring once in seven games, he began to receive criticism from the press, failing to score more than five goals in seven games for the first time since moving to Europe in 2011. On 21 October, he scored his first UEFA Champions League goal for the club against Astana in a 4–0 win, and four days later, he opened the scoring in a 2–1 victory against Valencia. On 12 November, while playing for the Colombia national team against Chile, he suffered an ankle injury and had to be taken off the field on a stretcher, which ruled him out for a month. He made his return on 30 December in a 0–2 away win against Rayo Vallecano, entering the pitch in the 70th minute and assisting Antoine Griezmann's goal in the last minute.

He struggled to adapt to Diego Simeone's playing style, as he was more accustomed to playing as a lone striker with Porto. The press labelled him "a flop" and some of his teammates said he was not confident, with club president Enrique Cerezo adding that the player "wasn't at the level of the club".

=== Guangzhou Evergrande ===
On 3 February 2016, Martínez was transferred to Chinese Super League side Guangzhou Evergrande Taobao with a fee of €42 million, a record for an Asian team. The record was broken two days later, when Alex Teixeira signed for Jiangsu Suning for £38.4 million (roughly €50 million). On 24 February, he made his debut against South Korean club Pohang Steelers. On 6 March, he scored on his Chinese Super League debut in an eventual 2–1 loss away at Chongqing Lifan. A week later, he scored and gave an assist in a 3–0 win against Changchun Yatai. On 15 April, during a match against Henan Jianye, he suffered an ankle injury and had to be substituted, which ruled him out for two months. He had ankle surgery a few days later, which ruled him out for a further five weeks. He returned to action on 9 August in a goalless draw against Beijing Guoan, playing the last 20 minutes of the match.

On 26 October 2016, after playing 16 games, Martínez suffered an ankle injury that ruled him out for almost two years, causing him to miss the entire 2017 season and part of the 2018 season. He had another ankle surgery in July 2017. In March 2018, Guangzhou Evergrande terminated his contract and released him because of his chronic injuries, believing that there was no point of paying his salary if he could not play.

=== Portimonense ===
On 31 August 2018, Martínez returned to Portugal's top flight, joining Portimonense on a season-long loan. The deal was subsequently made permanent, but only until the end of 2019.

He made his debut in a 3–2 victory against Vitória de Guimarães on 23 September, playing the last 17 minutes of the match. On 3 November, he scored his first goal for the club, a penalty, in a 1–1 draw against Belenenses. On 2 December, he scored in a 3–2 victory against Tondela, but was substituted with an injury in the second half. On 7 December, he returned to the Estádio do Dragão for the first time since leaving Porto, playing 75 minutes and receiving a standing ovation by the fans and players as he was substituted. A week later, he scored a brace in a 3–1 win against Vitória de Setúbal. On 11 May 2019, he scored an 88th-minute winner against Maritimo in a 3–2 victory.

In January 2020, he signed a new contract with the Portuguese club, keeping him until 2022. His last match for the club was on 26 July 2020, where he wore the captain's armband in a 2–0 victory against Desportivo Aves. He made 24 appearances and scored once for the 2019–20 season, where Portimonense finished 17th in the table and were set to be relegated, but avoided the drop due to 16th-placed Vitoria Setubal failing to provide documentation for the following season. Still troubled by his chronic ankle injuries, Martínez left Portimonense in August 2020, stating that he wanted to return to Independiente Medellín.

On 7 December 2020, after spending six months as a free agent, Martínez officially announced his retirement.

=== Independiente Medellín ===
In September 2026, Martínez made an unexpected return to football, signing with Independiente Medellín after a six-year absence from the pitch.

== International career ==
A Colombian international at the age of 22, he made his debut and scored his first international goal on 5 September 2009 in a 2–0 victory against Ecuador as part of the 2010 FIFA World Cup qualifiers. Four days later, he came on as a substitute and scored his second international goal against Uruguay, although Colombia lost 3–1. On 7 June 2011, he was selected by Hernán Darío Gómez to the 23-man-squad for the 2011 Copa América.

On 2 June 2014, Martínez was named by coach José Pékerman in Colombia's 23-man squad for the 2014 FIFA World Cup. After a substitute appearance in the team's opening match win over Greece, Martínez was selected to start in the final group game against Japan, where he scored twice in a 4–1 win and was named man of the match.

Martínez was also chosen for the 2015 Copa América in Chile. The last time he was called up to the national team was for a 2018 World Cup qualification match against Chile on 12 November 2015, where he suffered an injury.

== Personal life ==
His nickname "Cha Cha Cha" came from his father, Orlando Martinez, who was a second division footballer in Colombia. Orlando would celebrate his goals by doing the "Cha Cha Cha" dance, so his teammates began to call him that. The nickname was passed on to Jackson and he often does the celebration as well. He moved with his family to Villa Hermosa, Medellín at age 15, and spent a year hopping around local clubs before joining Independiente Medellin's academy aged 16.

Martínez married Tatiana Caicedo in March 2013, and the couple have two children; a son named Josue, born in 2012, and a daughter named Samantha, born in January 2015. He is a Christian. In September 2018, he released a seven-track Christian hip hop album titled No Temeré ("I Will Not Fear").

In his youth, Martínez played baseball, basketball, and volleyball. He said these sports helped improve his agility and jumping ability, which he used to score acrobatic goals.

Martínez also runs a foundation named after him, called "Fundacion Jackson Martinez", which aims to help kids living in poverty buy adequate football gear, play competitive matches, and get scouted.

== Style of play ==
Martínez was known as a prolific goalscorer, being able to use both feet effectively, and having excellent volleying technique. He combined his volleying technique with his agility, which allowed him to score multiple acrobatic goals throughout his career. His height made him an aerial threat, and he combined this with his strength to win aerial battles, as well as to make it difficult for opponents to knock him off the ball.

Former Porto player Paulo Futre compared his traits to those of George Weah. Noted BBC journalist Tim Vickery described him as "an out-and-out goalscorer, a front-to-goal centre-forward who can finish off both feet, and with an excellent jump that makes him an aerial threat." In 2015, Arsène Wenger said that Martinez "could play in the Premier League because he has the body to make the difference," and that he was "a good finisher".

== Career statistics ==
=== Club ===
Appearances and goals by club, season and competition
Club	Season	League			National cup (Note: Includes Copa Colombia, Taça de Portugal, Copa del Rey, Chinese FA Cup)		League cup (Note: Includes Taça da Liga)		Continental		Other		Total	
Club	Season	Division	Apps	Goals	Apps	Goals	Apps	Goals	Apps	Goals	Apps	Goals	Apps	Goals
Independiente Medellín	2004	Categoría Primera A	9	4	–		—		0	0	–		9	4
Independiente Medellín	2005	Categoría Primera A	24	4	–		–		1	0	–		25	4
Independiente Medellín	2006	Categoría Primera A	22	4	–		–		1	0	–		23	4
Independiente Medellín	2007	Categoría Primera A	22	4	–		–		–		–		22	4
Independiente Medellín	2008	Categoría Primera A	37	11	3	0	–		–		–		40	11
Independiente Medellín	2009	Categoría Primera A	27	22	0	0	–		5 (Note: Appearances in Copa Libertadores)	3	–		32	25
Independiente Medellín	Total		141	49	3	0	–		7	3	–		151	52
Chiapas	2009–10	Primera División	13	9	–		–		–		–		13	9
Chiapas	2010–11	Primera División	16	4	–		–		4	3	–		20	7
Chiapas	2011–12	Primera División	35	20	–		–		–		–		35	20
Chiapas	Total		64	33	–		–		4	3	–		68	36
Porto	2012–13	Primeira Liga	30	26	0	0	4	1	8 (Note: Appearances in UEFA Champions League)	3	1 (Note: Appearance in Supertaça Cândido de Oliveira)	1	43	31
Porto	2013–14	Primeira Liga	30	20	5	2	4	3	11 (Note: Six appearances and two goals in UEFA Champions League, five appearances and one goal in UEFA Europa League)	3	1	1	51	29
Porto	2014–15	Primeira Liga	30	21	1	1	1	2	10	8	–		42	32
Porto	Total		90	67	6	3	9	6	29	14	2	2	136	92
Atlético Madrid	2015–16	La Liga	15	2	3	0	–		4	1	–		22	3
Guangzhou Evergrande	2016	Chinese Super League	10	4	1	0	–		4 (Note: Appearances in AFC Champions League)	0	1 (Note: Appearance in Chinese FA Super Cup)	0	16	4
Guangzhou Evergrande	2017	Chinese Super League	0	0	0	0	–		0	0	–		0	0
Guangzhou Evergrande	2018	Chinese Super League	0	0	0	0	–		0	0	–		0	0
Guangzhou Evergrande	Total		10	4	1	0	–		4	0	1	0	16	4
Portimonense (loan)	2018–19	Primeira Liga	27	9	1	0	0	0	–		–		28	9
Portimonense	2019–20	Primeira Liga	24	1	1	1	1	1	–		–		26	3
Career total			371	165	15	4	10	7	48	21	3	2	447	199

=== International ===
Appearances and goals by national team and year
National team	Year	Apps	Goals
Colombia	2009	5	3
Colombia	2010	3	0
Colombia	2011	5	1
Colombia	2012	4	1
Colombia	2013	8	2
Colombia	2014	9	2
Colombia	2015	6	0
Total		40	9

Scores and results list Colombia's goal tally first, score column indicates score after each Martínez goal.

List of international goals scored by Jackson Martínez
No.	Date	Venue	Opponent	Score	Result	Competition
1	5 September 2009	Estadio Atanasio Girardot, Medellín, Colombia	Ecuador	1–0	2–0	2010 FIFA World Cup qualification
2	9 September 2009	Estadio Centenario, Montevideo, Uruguay	Uruguay	1–1	1–3	2010 FIFA World Cup qualification
3	10 October 2009	Estadio Atanasio Girardot, Medellín, Colombia	Chile	1–0	2–4	2010 FIFA World Cup qualification
4	6 September 2011	Lockhart Stadium, Fort Lauderdale, United States	Jamaica	1–0	2–0	Friendly
5	16 October 2012	Estadio Metropolitano Roberto Meléndez, Barranquilla, Colombia	Cameroon	1–0	3–0	Friendly
6	6 February 2013	Sun Life Stadium, Miami Gardens, United States	Guatemala	1–0	4–1	Friendly
7	6 February 2013	Sun Life Stadium, Miami Gardens, United States	Guatemala	2–0	4–1	Friendly
8	24 June 2014	Arena Pantanal, Cuiabá, Brazil	Japan	2–1	4–1	2014 FIFA World Cup
9	24 June 2014	Arena Pantanal, Cuiabá, Brazil	Japan	3–1	4–1	2014 FIFA World Cup

== Honours ==
Independiente Medellín

- Categoría Primera A: 2009-II

Porto

- Primeira Liga: 2012–13
- Supertaça Cândido de Oliveira: 2012, 2013

Guangzhou Evergrande

- Chinese Super League: 2016
- Chinese FA Cup: 2016
- Chinese FA Super Cup: 2016

Individual

- Categoría Primera A Top goal scorer: 2009 Finalizacion
- Categoria Primera A Best Player: 2009 Finalizacion
- Categoria Primera A Dream Team: 2009 Finalizacion
- Supertaça Cândido de Oliveira Man of the match: 2012
- SJPF Player of the Month: October 2012, November 2012, February 2013, December 2014, January 2015
- O Jogo Team of the Year: 2012, 2013
- Primeira Liga Top goal scorer: 2012–13, 2013–14, 2014–15
- FC Porto Athlete of the Year: 2014, 2015
