= Ismael Fuentes =

Chilean footballer (born 1981)

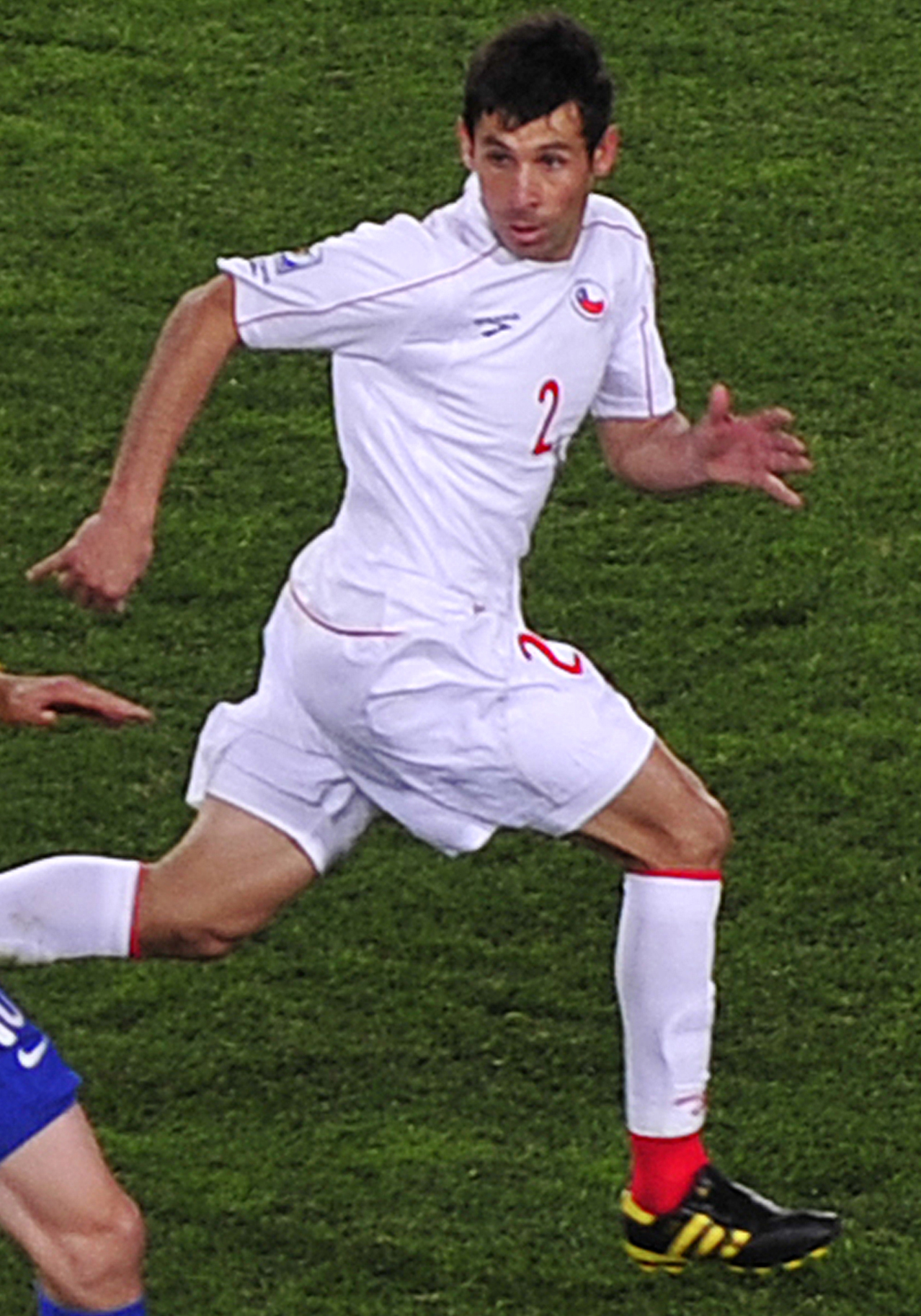
- Fuentes at the 2010 World Cup

Personal information
- Full name: Ismael Ignacio Fuentes Castro
- Date of birth: 4 August 1981 (age 45)
- Place of birth: Villa Alegre, Chile
- Height: 1.82 m (5 ft 11 1/2 in)
- Position: Defender

Youth career
- Deportes Linares

Senior career*
| Years | Team | Apps | (Gls) |
| 1999–2001 | Deportes Linares | | (1) |
| 2001–2004 | Rangers | 63 | (2) |
| 2004 | Colo-Colo | 18 | (0) |
| 2005–2012 | Chiapas | 175 | (5) |
| 2009 | → Atlas (loan) | 28 | (2) |
| 2010 | → Universidad Católica (loan) | 11 | (0) |
| 2013 | Correcaminos UAT | 4 | (0) |
| 2013–2014 | Deportes Antofagasta | 15 | (0) |
| 2014–2015 | Santos de Guápiles | 19 | (3) |
| 2015–2016 | Coquimbo Unido | 21 | (0) |
| 2017 | Rangers | 11 | (0) |
| Total | | | (13) |

International career
| 2001 | Chile U20 | | |
| 2004–2010 | Chile | 30 | (1) |
- * Club domestic league appearances and goals

Ismael Ignacio Fuentes Castro (born 4 August 1981) is a Chilean former footballer who played as centre back.

== Club career ==
Fuentes made his debut with Deportes Linares in the Primera B de Chile and then he moved to Rangers in 2001.

== International career ==
Fuentes represented Chile at under-20 level in the 2001 South American Championship. At senior level, he made 30 appearances and scored one goal between 2004 and 2010.

=== International goals ===
| Goal | Date | Venue | Opponent | Score | Result | Competition |
|---|---|---|---|---|---|---|
| 1 | 10 September 2008 | Estadio Nacional, Santiago, Chile | Colombia | 3–0 | 4–0 | 2010 FIFA World Cup qualifier |

== Post-retirement ==
Fuentes was elected a member of the Regional Council of Maule for the Linares Province in the 2024 Chilean regional elections supported by Independent Democratic Union.

In June 2025, Fuentes joined the Rodeo club Talca Norte to compete in the Asociación Talca Oriente.

== Honours ==
Universidad Católica

- Primera División de Chile (1): 2010
