= Luis Esqueda =

Mexican footballer (born 1981)

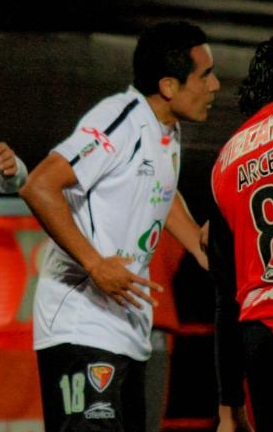

Personal information
- Full name: Luis Ricardo Esqueda Ornelas
- Date of birth: February 25, 1981 (age 45)
- Place of birth: Aguascalientes, Mexico
- Height: 1.73 m (5 ft 8 in)
- Position: Midfielder

Senior career*
Years	Team	Apps	(Gls)
2001–2007	Pachuca	17	(0)
2008–2011	Indios	49	(5)
2010–2011	→ Chiapas (loan)	8	(0)
2011–2013	Chiapas	76	(4)
2013–2015	Querétaro	0	(0)
2014–2015	→ Puebla (loan)		
2016–2017	Querétaro	2	(1)
- * Club domestic league appearances and goals as of 3 May 2013

Luis Ricardo Esqueda Ornelas (born 25 February 1981) in Aguascalientes, Mexico, is a Mexican retired professional footballer, who played as midfielder or full-back for Querétaro in the Liga MX.

== Career ==
=== Return to Querétaro ===
On 29 December 2015, Club Querétaro announced the return of Esqueda.

== Honours ==
=== Club ===
Querétaro

- Copa MX: Apertura 2016
- Supercopa MX: 2017
