= Édgar Andrade =

Mexican footballer (born 1988)

Edgar Andrade
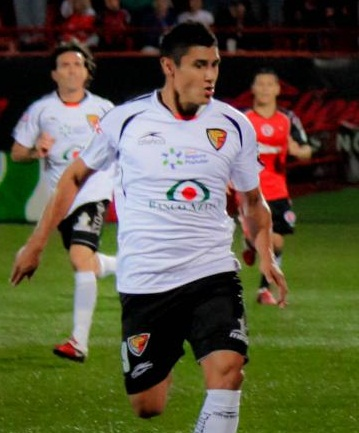
- Andrade playing for Chiapas

Personal information
- Full name: Edgar Andrade
- Date of birth: March 2, 1988 (age 38)
- Place of birth: Veracruz, Mexico
- Height: 1.76 m (5 ft 9 in)
- Position: Midfielder

Senior career*
Years	Team	Apps	(Gls)
2006–2010	Cruz Azul	40	(3)
2010–2013	Chiapas	103	(13)
2013	Morelia	18	(3)
2014	Pachuca	10	(1)
2014–2018	Veracruz	79	(6)
2018–2019	Cafetaleros	1	(0)

International career
2005	Mexico U17	8	(1)
2006	Mexico U23	11	(2)
2011–2012	Mexico	8	(0)
Medal record
Representing Mexico
Men's football
FIFA U-17 World Cup
Winner	2005 Peru
- * Club domestic league appearances and goals

Edgar Bismarck Andrade Rentería (born 2 March 1988) is a Mexican former professional footballer who played as a midfielder. He made his debut in Cruz Azul on January 28, 2006, in a game against Atlas which resulted in a draw. He was on the Mexico national football under-17 team that won the 2005 FIFA U-17 World Championship. While playing for Cruz Azul he broke his ankle while attempting to recover a ball for his team, in a 2007 match against Estudiantes Tecos UAG. After many months of recovery, he returned to the field in 2007.

== International Caps ==
As of 12 June 2012

International appearances
#	Date	Venue	Opponent	Result	Competition
1.	11 October 2011	Estadio Corona, Torreón, Mexico	Brazil	1–2	Friendly
2.	11 November 2011	Estadio Corregidora, Querétaro, Mexico	Serbia	2–0	Friendly
3.	25 January 2012	Reliant Stadium, Houston, United States	Venezuela	3–1	Friendly
4.	27 May 2012	MetLife Stadium, East Rutherford, United States	Wales	2–0	Friendly
5.	31 May 2012	Soldier Field, Chicago, United States	Bosnia and Herzegovina	2–1	Friendly
6.	3 June 2012	Cowboys Stadium, Arlington, United States	Brazil	2–0	Friendly
7.	8 June 2012	Estadio Azteca, Mexico City, Mexico	Guyana	3–1	2014 FIFA World Cup Qualification
8.	12 June 2012	Estadio Cuscatlán, San Salvador, El Salvador	El Salvador	1–2	2014 FIFA World Cup Qualification

== Honours ==
Morelia

- Copa MX: Apertura 2013

Veracruz

- Copa MX: Clausura 2016

Mexico U17

- FIFA U-17 World Championship: 2005
