= Jorge Rodríguez (footballer, born 1985) =

Uruguayan footballer

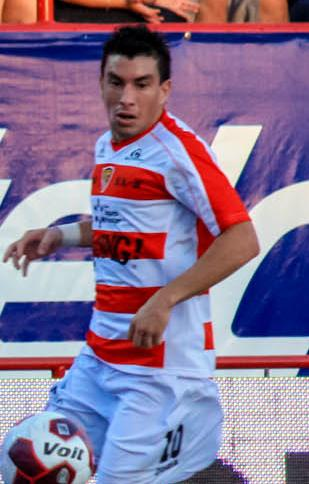
- Rodríguez with Chiapas in 2012

Personal information
- Full name: Jorge Marcelo Rodríguez Núñez
- Date of birth: 13 January 1985 (age 41)
- Place of birth: Montevideo, Uruguay
- Height: 1.73 m (5 ft 8 in)
- Position: Midfielder

Team information
- Current team: Bella Italia

Youth career
- Racing Montevideo

Senior career*
Years	Team	Apps	(Gls)
2003–2004	Racing Montevideo	15	(1)
2005	Fénix	4	(0)
2006	Racing Montevideo	10	(3)
2006	Atenas	7	(0)
2006–2007	Nacional	2	(0)
2007–2010	River Plate Montevideo	74	(9)
2010–2013	Chiapas	103	(14)
2013–2015	Peñarol	55	(9)
2015–2016	Tigre	23	(3)
2017	Cerro	36	(3)
2018	Palestino	16	(1)
2019	Progreso	18	(0)
2020	Villa Teresa	11	(1)
2022	Parque del Plata	10	(2)
2023–	Bella Italia	32	(5)

International career
2008–2010	Uruguay	5	(0)
- * Club domestic league appearances and goals as of 6 December 2024

Jorge Marcelo Rodríguez Núñez (born January 13, 1985) is a Uruguayan footballer who plays as a midfielder for Bella Italia.

== Club career ==
Rodríguez started his career in Uruguay where he played for Racing and Fénix.

In July 2010, he signed a new contract with the Mexican club Chiapas.

In 2022, Rodríguez played for CD Parque del Plata. In 2023 and 2024, Rodríguez played for Bella Italia.

== International career ==
Rodríguez received first cap at the friendly match against Japan on August 20, 2008.

On July 27, 2010, he was reserved to play a friendly match against Angola in Lisbon.
