= Miguel Ángel Martínez (Argentine footballer) =

Argentine-Mexican footballer

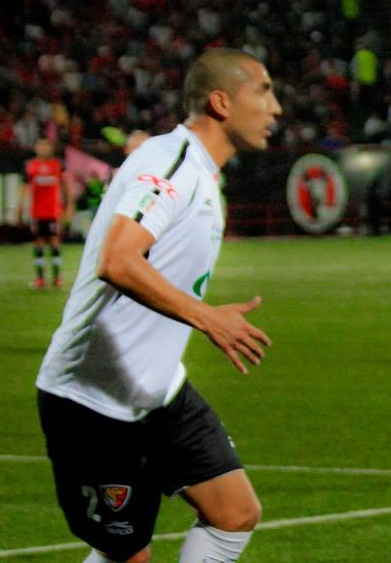
- Martínez with Querétaro in 2016

Personal information
- Full name: Miguel Ángel Martínez
- Date of birth: 19 January 1984 (age 42)
- Place of birth: Azul, Argentina
- Height: 1.87 m (6 ft 2 in)
- Position: Centre back

Team information
- Current team: Jaiba Brava (manager)

Youth career
- 2005–2006: Racing

Senior career*
| Years | Team | Apps | (Gls) |
| 2006–2008 | Belgrano | 49 | (1) |
| 2008 | León | 14 | (0) |
| 2009–2011 | Atlante | 47 | (1) |
| 2011–2013 | Jaguares | 84 | (1) |
| 2014–2018 | Querétaro | 102 | (2) |
| 2018–2019 | Belgrano | 5 | (0) |

Managerial career
- 2020–2022: Sonora (Assistant)
- 2022: Atlético Morelia (Assistant)
- 2023: Toluca (Assistant)
- 2024: Santos Laguna (Assistant)
- 2026–: Jaiba Brava
- * Club domestic league appearances and goals

Miguel Ángel Martínez (born January 19, 1984) is a retired Argentine football defender and currently manager of Liga de Expansión MX team Club Jaiba Brava. Martínez also holds Mexican citizenship.

== Background ==
Martínez spent some time in the youth squads of Racing Club of his native Argentina and Atletico de Madrid in Spain, before moving to Mexico in 2008 to play for Club León for the Apertura 2008.

For the Clausura 2009 tournament, he was traded to Atlante F.C. He was given the #2 shirt, vacated by his compatriot Javier Muñoz, who left to CF Pachuca.

On 9 May 2019 it was confirmed, that Martínez had retired from football.

== Honours ==
=== Club ===
Querétaro

- Copa MX: Apertura 2016
- Supercopa MX: 2017
