= Franco Arizala =

Colombian football striker (born 1986)

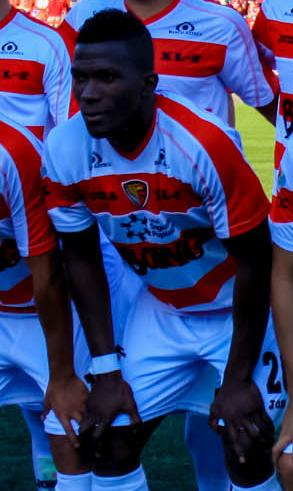
- Arizala with Jaguares in 2012

Personal information
- Full name: Franco Faustino Arizala Hurtado
- Date of birth: 4 June 1986 (age 40)
- Place of birth: Nariño, Colombia
- Height: 1.80 m (5 ft 11 in)
- Positions: Forward; second striker

Youth career
- Deportes Tolima

Senior career*
| Years | Team | Apps | (Gls) |
| 2004–2005 | Cortuluá | 19 | (7) |
| 2006–2007 | Boyacá Chicó | 19 | (3) |
| 2008–2010 | Deportes Tolima | 93 | (33) |
| 2010–2012 | Pachuca | 27 | (8) |
| 2011–2015 | Chiapas | 93 | (16) |
| 2012–2013 | → León (loan) | 34 | (3) |
| 2015–2016 | Atlas | 27 | (5) |
| 2016–2017 | Puebla | 2 | (0) |
| 2017 | Chiapas | 10 | (0) |
| 2017–2018 | Atlético Bucaramanga | 25 | (8) |
| 2018 | Al-Arabi | 9 | (2) |
| 2019 | Cafetaleros de Tapachula | 25 | (7) |
| 2020 | Alebrijes de Oaxaca | 17 | (5) |
| 2021 | Deportivo Pereira | | |
| 2022 | Alianza | | |
- * Club domestic league appearances and goals as of 11:33, 25 May 2020 (UTC)

Franco Faustino Arizala Hurtado (born June 4, 1986) is a Colombian former professional footballer who played as a striker. He also holds Mexican citizenship.

== Honours ==
León

- Liga MX (2): Apertura 2013, Clausura 2014
