= Óscar Razo =

Mexican footballer (born 1984)

Oscar Razo
Personal information
- Full name: Oscar Francisco Razo Ventura
- Date of birth: 9 April 1984 (age 42)
- Place of birth: Irapuato, Guanajuato, Mexico
- Height: 1.77 m (5 ft 9 1/2 in)
- Position: Left back

Youth career
- 2002: Irapuato

Senior career*
Years	Team	Apps	(Gls)
2003–2006	Irapuato	34	(8)
2004–2005	→ Pachuca Juniors (loan)	18	(0)
2006–2007	Veracruz	21	(0)
2007–2013	Chiapas	140	(4)
2012	→ Morelia (loan)	5	(0)
2013–2014	Atlas	31	(0)
- * Club domestic league appearances and goals as of 12 May 2013

Oscar Francisco Razo Ventura (born 9 April 1984) is a Mexican former professional footballer who played as a defender. He previously played for CD Veracruz, and made 16 appearances for them in 2006–07. He retired on 1 January 2015.
