= Estadio Víctor Manuel Reyna =

Football stadium in Tuxtla Gutierrez, Mexico

Coordinates: 16°45′46.02″N 93°5′46.93″W

Estadio Zoque Víctor Manuel Reyna
- Estadio Jaguar "Jaguar Stadium"; La Selva Jaguar "The Jungle of The Jaguar"; La Selva Chiapaneca "The Jungle of Chiapas"
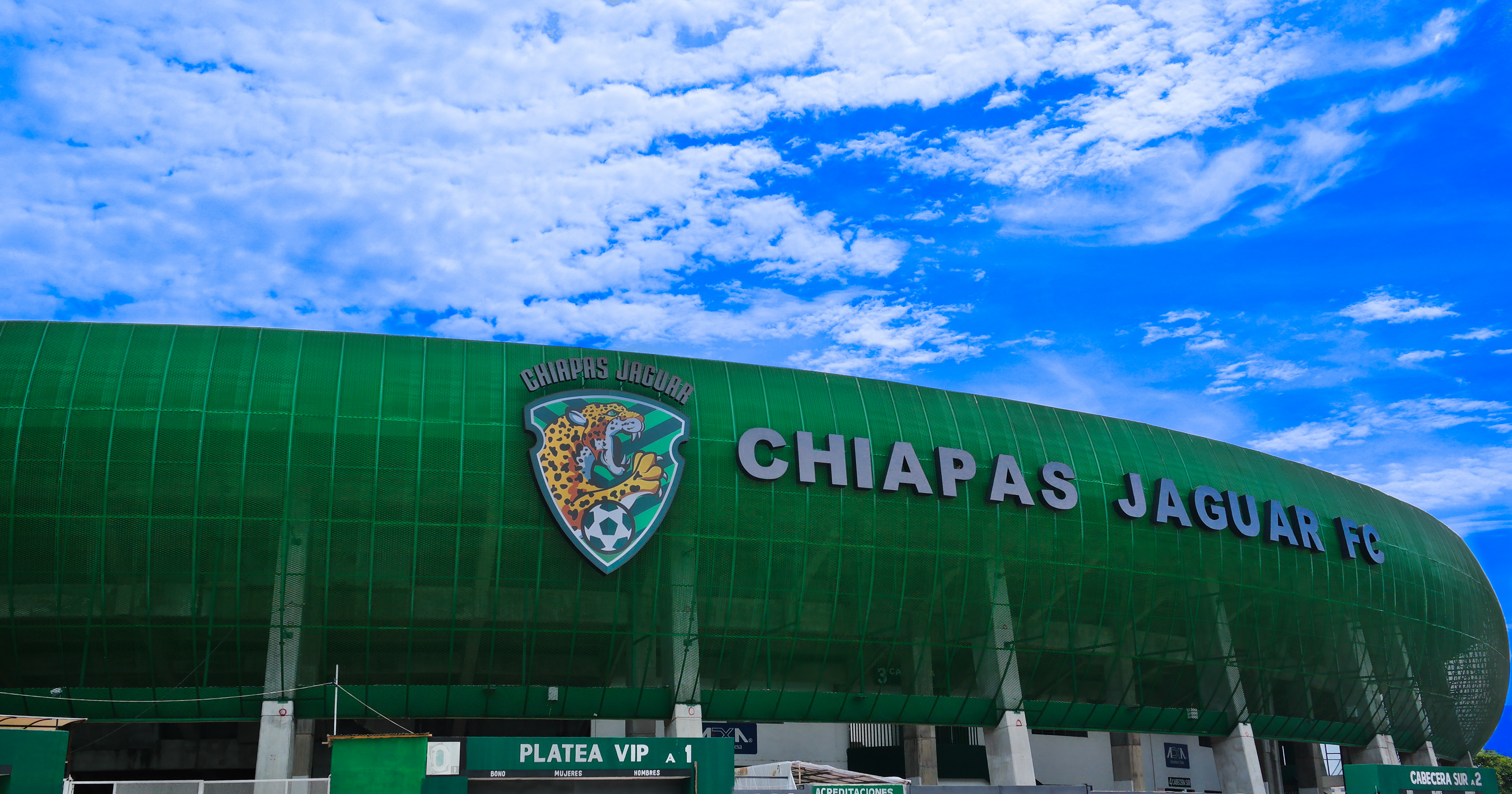
- Interactive map of Estadio Zoque Víctor Manuel Reyna
- Location: Tuxtla Gutiérrez, Chiapas, Mexico
- Owner: Chiapas F.C /State of Chiapas Government
- Capacity: 29,001 (official capacity after most recent renovation)
- Surface: Lawn

Construction
- Opened: 1982

Tenants
- Chiapas/Jaguares (Liga MX/Liga Premier) (2002–2017, 2024–); Tuxtla F.C. (Liga Premier) (2017–2019); Cafetaleros (Ascenso MX/Liga Premier) (2019–2024)

The Estadio Víctor Manuel Reyna is a football stadium located in Tuxtla Gutierrez, Chiapas, Mexico. This facility has a capacity of 29,001 seats and was built in 2003. This sport facility is used mostly for football matches and is currently the home stadium for Cafetaleros de Chiapas. It also hosted shows as the final of La Academia Última Generación.

== History ==
The capital city stadium was built in 1982 to accommodate 6000 spectators, however after 20 years officially became the venue for matches in the first division tournaments FMF . Later, the stadium was remodeled and expanded to have a capacity of 27,500 fans. The stadium was inaugurated in 1984 with the official match between Club America and the extinct Student team Chiapas. The current name stadium stood to honor Victor Manuel Reyna (1910-1973), professor of physical education in Tuxtla Gutierrez, where he created the first state leagues and municipal, that in the 50s. It is distinguished not only by investing much of their salary to equip street children to practice the sport, but also to convey to young broader social values. He is considered the father of football in Chiapas. Throughout its history, the stadium has hosted Zoque liguillas five First Division and tournaments at all levels of Mexican soccer. It has also presented friendly matches Mexico national football team against Ecuador over the selections and Canada. In 2011, the Zoque witnessed official games for ranking and tournament Copa Libertadores .

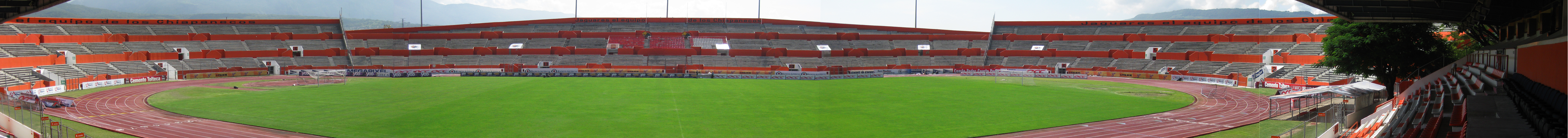
A panoramic view from the Grandstand Shadow of Victor Manuel Reyna Stadium

== Facilities ==
=== Courts ===
It has a system of computerized irrigation and drainage system that prevents puddles made even under heavy rainfall, characteristic of the city in the summer and fall. The grass varies by climate, therefore has three common varieties like grass, Sahara and 328, which are tolerant to heat and rain.

=== Gym ===
To improve conditions in professional players Jaguares de Chiapas, the gym is equipped with modern appliances like goo bike, glidex 600, adductor, abdominal crunch, vertical traction, extension arm, calf rotary, pulley, lat machine, glute, leg press, lower back, leg curl, leg extension and technogim Ce

=== Media Room ===
For presentations, lectures and interviews, the stadium has a room with 40 seats, tables, local sound, projectors, screens, phones, and other devices to the media.

=== Parking ===
The stadium has three parking to accommodate 1,240 vehicles. Preferential parking has 150 drawers located between Causeway Boulevard and the Ethnic Fidel Velazquez. The South has 190 parking located between Causeway drawers Ethnic and Sport Unit. And the North has 900 parking drawers located in the Northern Bypass in circulation from west to east. In addition, the stadium has an exclusive parking inside for players and officials. The entrance is on the north parking lot 4 and access.

=== Tribune ===
Currently the stadium has the capacity to accommodate 24,000 fans that can be placed in different areas. The zones are North Head (6.702 points), South Head (6.734 points), Preferred (7.733 points), Allocated Preferred (538 numbered seats) VIP Platea (1724 numbered seats), VIP Area (40 numbered seats) and Super Palco ( 37 numbered seats).

=== Health Care Center ===
It is an area of 42 square meters, located under Plateas VIP area. Inside is a clinic, a rehabilitation ward physiotherapy, hydrotherapy baths and a full team of specialists who care for the health of the team's players representative.

=== Dressing ===
It has all the requirements needed for the comfort of the players as custom lockers, hot tub, TVs and a pool area. It also has one dresses himself to the coaching staff, visiting team, referees, assistants and equipment basic forces.

== Infrastructure ==
The sports complex is linked to the areas of ISSTECH (Institute social security for workers in the state of Chiapas) and features: basketball courts, tennis courts, racquetball, Olympic swimming pool, baseball stadium, the stadium also has track and one of the country's best irrigation systems.

== See also ==
- List of football stadiums in Mexico
