= Jaguares F.C. =

Association football club in Mexico

Jaguares
- Full name: Jaguares Fútbol Club
- Nickname: Jaguares (Jaguars)
- Short name: JAG, JFC
- Founded: 27 June 2002; 24 years ago (as Jaguares de Chiapas Fútbol Club); 28 June 2024; 2 years ago (refounded as Jaguares Fútbol Club)
- Ground: Estadio Víctor Manuel Reyna
- Capacity: 29,001
- Owner: Lenny de Régules
- Chairman: Lenny de Régules
- Manager: Jorge Espejo
- League: Liga Premier (Primera Premier)
- 2025–26: Regular phase: 8th of 13 (Group III); Final phase: Not qualified
Home colours	Away colours	Third colours

Jaguares Fútbol Club is a professional football club based in Tuxtla Gutiérrez, Chiapas. The club competes in Liga Premier (Primera Premier), the third level of Mexican football, and plays its home matches at Estadio Víctor Manuel Reyna. Founded in 2002 as Jaguares de Chiapas Fútbol Club, the club was renamed as Chiapas Fútbol Club in 2013, and the current franchise was refounded in 2024.

In 2013, the franchise of San Luis FC was relocated to Tuxtla Gutiérrez, after the original franchise of Jaguares was relocated to Querétaro. From 2002 to 2017, the club competed in Liga MX.

== History ==
=== Jaguares de Chiapas FC (2002–2013) ===
The original franchise was founded on June 27, 2002 after the relocation of the Tiburones Rojos de Veracruz franchise to Tuxtla Gutiérrez, Chiapas. They played their first game on August 3, against Tigres UANL, losing 1–3 at home, with Lucio Filomeno scoring the club's first ever goal. The club's first win came on August 25, beating San Luis 1–0. They finished the Apertura 2002, with a record of three wins, seven draws, and nine defeats. In the Clausura 2005 they finished with six wins, four draws, and seven defeats, and the head coach José Luis Trejo was sacked in the middle of the season. The club then named Antonio Mohamed as manager, but poor results meant another change with Fernando Quirarte taking over for the remainder of the season, bringing stability to the team and results improved. They won the Chiapas Cup in 2004 and on July 16, 2005, they won the Chiapas Cup for a second time, by defeating Necaxa at the Estadio Víctor Manuel Reyna. In February 2008, Sergio Almaguer was named manager of Chiapas.

In the Clausura 2006, under new coach Eduardo de la Torre, the club finished with the second best record over the regular season, and with it a place in the Play-offs, where they lost in the Quarter-finals to Guadalajara.

On May 20, 2013, the club was sold to Grupo Delfines whose majority stake holder Amado Yañez is also owner of Querétaro. Stating low attendance and lack of sponsorship, the new owner announced he would be relocating the team to the city Querétaro, Querétaro to replace Querétaro recently relegated to the Segunda División de México. The owner added the fans of Querétaro deserved a top division club in their city.

Club logo, 2002-2012

=== Chiapas FC (2013–2017) ===
On May 20, 2013, it was announced that the Jaguares de Chiapas franchise was sold and moved to the city of Querétaro, Querétaro and merged with the Querétaro franchise. On May 28, 2013, it was announced San Luis was relocated to the city of Tuxtla Gutiérrez, Chiapas and renamed as Chiapas Fútbol Club, thus bringing back a Primera División de México team back to Chiapas. The new Chiapas franchise took over the San Luis television contract with Televisa. At the conclusion of the Clausura 2017 tournament, Chiapas F.C. was relegated to the Liga de Ascenso de México after finishing in last place in the relegation table.

On June 8, 2017, the team was dissolved after the owner of Chiapas, Carlos López Chargoy met with their coaching staff and players. However, a week later, the president of the Liga MX announced that the team was disaffiliated and made bail to pay what was due. The next day, a soccer team would return to Chiapas, but it would have to play in the Liga Premier. Jiquipilas Valle Verde F.C. announced on June 23 that it would relocate its franchise from Jiquipilas to Tuxtla Gutiérrez, naming the team Chiapas Jaguar and playing their home games at Estadio Víctor Manuel Reyna, but four days later, this did not happen because the Federación Mexicana de Fútbol (FMF) prohibited it to use the name, which the López Chargoy family owns.

=== Jaguares FC (2024–present) ===
At the end of Clausura 2024, a rumor arose that the management of the Cimarrones de Sonora team was seeking to negotiate the transfer of the franchise to Tuxtla Gutiérrez, Chiapas to revive Jaguares F.C. Finally, on 30 May 2024, Juan Pablo Rojo –president of Cimarrones– announced through a statement that the institution was in the process of selling the membership certificate corresponding to the Liga de Expansión MX. However, the sale was not completed, and it was announced that the team would continue playing in Hermosillo, Sonora.

On July 12, 2024 the project was rejected by the Liga de Expansión owners assembly, so finally Jaguares F.C. began competing in the Liga Premier - Serie A, using the place that Cafetaleros de Chiapas had in the league and that was originally going to be used for a reserve squad of Jaguares F.C.

== Honours ==
=== Friendly ===
- Copa Corona: 2002
- Copa Chiapas: 2003, 2005, 2007, 2015
- Copa Soconusco: 2009
- Copa Mesoamericana: 2011
- Torneo Internacional Tacaná: 2014

== International record ==
Season	Competition	Round	Club	Home	Away	Aggregate
2011	Copa Libertadores	First Stage	(Peru) Alianza Lima	2–0	2–0	4–0
2011	Copa Libertadores	Group 6	(Bolivia) Jorge Wilstermann	2–0	1–2	2nd
2011	Copa Libertadores	Group 6	(Brazil) Internacional	1–0	0–4	2nd
2011	Copa Libertadores	Group 6	(Ecuador) Emelec	2–1	0–1	2nd
2011	Copa Libertadores	Round of 16	(Colombia) Junior	1–1	3–3	4–4 (a)
2011	Copa Libertadores	Quarter-finals	(Paraguay) Cerro Porteño	1–1	0–1	1–2

== Players ==
=== First-team squad ===
As of 8 October 2026

Note: Flags indicate national team as defined under FIFA eligibility rules; some limited exceptions apply. Players may hold more than one non-FIFA nationality.

No.	Pos.	Nation	Player
1	GK	MEX	Carlos Higuera
2	DF	MEX	Aldo Navarro
3	DF	MEX	Luis Esponda
4	DF	MEX	Luis Silias
5	DF	MEX	Ismael Angulo
6	MF	MEX	Héctor Carranza
9	FW	MEX	Daniel Vázquez
10	MF	MEX	Diego Piñón
11	FW	BRA	Adson Dos Santos
12	DF	MEX	Alejandro Martínez
14	DF	MEX	Diego Esqueda
15	DF	MEX	Brian Navarrete

No.	Pos.	Nation	Player
17	MF	MEX	Diego Martínez
20	FW	MEX	Carlos Toledo
21	MF	MEX	Kevin Esquivel
22	MF	USA	Bryan Macías
23	MF	MEX	José Pablo Saldívar
25	DF	MEX	Alfredo Gutiérrez
28	FW	MEX	Pablo Palma
31	DF	MEX	Marcos Rosales
33	GK	MEX	Emmanuel Flores
42	DF	MEX	Fernando Gordillo
43	DF	MEX	Fabián Uscanga
44	GK	MEX	Héctor Méndez

== Reserves ==
=== Jaguares TDP ===
Reserve team that plays in the Liga TDP, the fourth level of Mexican football.

== Record players ==
Top 10 scorers
Pos	Player	Goals
1	(Paraguay) Salvador Cabañas	59
2	(Mexico) Carlos Ochoa	40
3	(Colombia) Jackson Martínez	36
4	(Colombia) Luis Gabriel Rey	27
5	(Mexico) Adolfo Bautista	22
6	(Argentina) Silvio Romero	21
7	(Brazil) Itamar Batista	21
8	(Colombia) Avilés Hurtado	20
9	(Brazil) Danilinho	18
10	(Colombia) Franco Arizala	17

Top 10 appearances
Pos	Player	Appearances
1	(Chile) Ismael Fuentes (retired)	184
2	(Mexico) José de Jesús Gutiérrez (retired)	163
3	(Mexico) Óscar Razo (retired)	154
4	(Mexico) Omar Ortiz (retired)	146
5	(Mexico) Felipe Ayala (retired)	146
6	(Mexico) Edgar Hernández	122
7	(Mexico) Gilberto Mora (retired)	120
8	(Mexico) Christian Valdez	119
9	(Uruguay) Jorge Rodríguez	114
10	(Mexico) Edgar Andrade	114

== Managers ==
=== Jaguares de Chiapas FC ===
- (Argentina) Salvador Capitano Valenti (July 1, 2002–Oct 13, 2002)
- (Chile) Jorge Garcés (Oct 14, 2002 - March 7, 2003)
- (Mexico) Sergio Bueno (March 13, 2003 – June 30, 2003)
- (Mexico) José Luis Trejo (July 1, 2003–Feb 14, 2005)
- (Mexico) Antonio Ascencio Meza (Feb 14, 2004–June 30, 2004)
- (Argentina) Antonio Mohamed (Feb 16, 2005–April 3, 2005)
- (Mexico) Fernando Quirarte (April 7, 2005–Sept 13, 2005)
- (Mexico) Luis Tena (Sept 15, 2005–June 30, 2006)
- (Mexico) Eduardo de la Torre (July 1, 2006–Feb 15, 2007)
- (Mexico) Víctor Manuel Vucetich (Feb 15, 2007–Sept 7, 2007)
- (Mexico) Isidoro García (Sept 8, 2007–Feb 17, 2008)
- (Mexico) Sergio Almaguer (Feb 20, 2008–Sept 21, 2008)
- (Mexico) Francisco Avilán Cruz (Sept 30, 2008–Dec 31, 2008)
- (Argentina) Miguel Brindisi (Jan 1, 2009–May 4, 2009)
- (Mexico) Luis Tena (May 5, 2009–Feb 8, 2010)
- (Mexico) Juan Manuel Álvarez (interim) (Feb 11, 2010–Feb 18, 2010)
- (Argentina) Pablo Marini (Feb 16, 2010–June 30, 2010)
- (Mexico) José Guadalupe Cruz (July 1, 2010 – June 30, 2013)

=== Chiapas FC ===
- (Mexico) Sergio Bueno (July 1, 2013 – May 18, 2015)
- (Argentina) Ricardo Lavolpe (May 25, 2015 – 2016)
- (Paraguay) José Cardozo (June 6, 2016 – September 18, 2016)
- (Mexico) Sergio Bueno (September 19, 2016 – June 8, 2017)

=== Jaguares FC ===
- (Mexico) Alfredo Durán (July 25, 2024 – January 11, 2025)
- (Mexico) José Luis Trejo (January 11, 2025 – May 30, 2025)
- (Mexico) Paco Ramírez (June 4, 2025 – 30 September 2025)
- (Mexico) Carlos Trejo (September 30, 2025 – June 30, 2026)
- (Peru) Jorge Espejo (August 2026 – present)

=== Shirt sponsors and manufacturers ===
Period	Kit manufacturer	Shirt partner
2002–03	Garcis	Soriana/Coca-Cola/Serfin/Superior/Farmacias del Ahorro
2003–04	Atletica	Farmacias del Ahorro
2005–07	Atletica	Farmacias del Ahorro
2007–08	Atletica	Farmacias del Ahorro/Chiapas
2008–09	Atletica	Farmacias del Ahorro
2009–10	Atletica	Farmacias del Ahorro/Banco Azteca/Chiapas
2010–11	Atletica	Banco Azteca/Coca-Cola/Sol
2011–12	Atletica	Banco Azteca/Pepsi/Seguro Popular/Sol
2012–13	Joma	Boing!/Sol/Banco Azteca/Seguro Popular
Apertura 2013	Pirma	Soriana/Corona Extra/Chiapas/Motorola
Clausura 2014	Kappa	Soriana/OCC/Corona Extra/Chiapas/City Club
Apertura 2014	Pirma	Chiapas/Corona Extra/Autobuses Aexa

== See also ==
- Cultural significance of the jaguar in North America
- Football in Mexico
- Tuxtla F.C.
