= List of C.F. Monterrey records and statistics =

C.F. Monterrey is a Mexican professional association football team based in Guadalupe, Nuevo León, that competes in Liga MX. This is a list of records for the team, which dates from their inaugural season in 1945 to present.

This list covers C.F. Monterrey's major accolades, the records set by the club, its managers, and its players. The player records section includes details of the club's top scorers and those with the most appearances in first-team competitions. It also records the notable achievements of Monterrey players at international level.

Monterrey has won five league titles, three domestic cups, and five CONCACAF Champions League titles (notably, three consecutive tournaments in 2011, 2012 and 2013). In 2020, Monterrey became the second Mexican club to complete the continental treble.

== Honours ==
The club has won a total of 14 titles.

Continental
Competitions	Titles	Seasons	Runner-up
CONCACAF Champions League	5	2010–11; 2011–12; 2012–13; 2019; 2021	—
CONCACAF Cup Winners Cup	1	1993	—
National
Competitions	Titles	Seasons	Runner-up
Liga MX	5	México 1986; Clausura 2003; Apertura 2009; Apertura 2010; Apertura 2019	1992–93; Apertura 2004; Apertura 2005; Clausura 2012; Clausura 2016; Apertura 2017; Apertura 2024
Copa MX	3	1991–92; Apertura 2017; 2019–20	1963–64; 1968–69; Apertura 2018
Supercopa MX	0	—	2018
Campeón de Campeones	0	—	2003

== Club records ==
=== Wins ===
- 8–3 vs. Necaxa (Liga MX)

=== Losses ===
- 0–14 vs. C.D. Veracruz (Liga MX)

== Individual records ==
=== Top scorers ===
Place	Name	Period	Liga MX	Copa MX	Continental (Note: Includes CONCACAF Champions Cup, CONCACAF Cup Winners Cup, and Copa Libertadores.)	World	Other (Note: Includes Leagues Cup, Supercopa MX, Supercopa de la Liga, Campeón de Campeones, Pre-Libertadores, and Interliga.)	Total
1	(Argentina) Rogelio Funes Mori	2015–2024	133	19	5	3	0	160
2	(Chile) Humberto Suazo	2007–2015	102	0	16	2	1	121
3	(Brazil) Mario de Souza	1984–1992	90	5	1	0	0	96
4	(Colombia) Dorlan Pabón	2013–2021	73	12	3	0	0	88
5	(Mexico) Aldo de Nigris	2009–2013, 2015–2017	66	0	15	2	0	83
6	(Brazil) Milton Carlos	1973–1978	73	0	0	0	0	73
7	(Uruguay) Rubén Romeo Corbo	1974–1980	69	0	1	0	0	70
8	(Argentina) Guillermo Franco	2002–2006	63	0	2	0	0	65
9	(Mexico) Alfredo Jiménez	1970–1975	58	0	1	0	0	59
10	(Mexico) Francisco Javier Cruz	1984–1988, 1999	54	0	3	0	0	57

=== Most appearances ===
Place	Name	Period	Apps
1	(Mexico) Magdaleno Cano	1967–1982	437
2	(Mexico) Jesús Arellano	1994–1997, 2000–2011	407
3	(Argentina) José María Basanta	2008–2014, 2016–2020	390
4	(Mexico) Luis Ernesto Pérez	2003–2012, 2015–2016	388
5	(Mexico) Jonathan Orozco	2005–2016	371
6	(Colombia) Stefan Medina	2014, 2016–	350
7	(Argentina) Rogelio Funes Mori	2015–2023	328
8	(Mexico) Jesús Zavala	2006–2018	285

== International competition statistics ==
Competition	Played	Won	Draw	Loss	GF	GA	GD	Win%
CONCACAF Champions Cup/League	85	53	20	12	165	70	+95	62.35
CONCACAF Cup Winners Cup*	7	5	1	1	20	7	+13	71.43
Copa Pre Libertadores*	6	3	1	2	13	9	+4	50.00
Copa Libertadores	12	3	4	5	15	17	−2	25.00
FIFA Club World Cup	12	6	2	4	25	18	+7	50.00
Leagues Cup	9	5	1	3	13	12	+1	55.56
Total	131	75	30	26	251	133	+118	57.25

(*) This competition is inactive.

== Awards ==
=== Players ===
- Balón de Oro Liga MX
  - (Argentina) Guillermo Franco (2003-C)
  - (Chile) Humberto Suazo (2009-A, 2010-A)
- CONCACAF Champions Cup Golden Ball
  - (Mexico) Aldo de Nigris (2012–13)
  - (Argentina) Nicolás Sánchez (2019)
  - (Mexico) Rogelio Funes Mori (2021)

=== Managements ===
- Best Management Liga MX
  - (Argentina) Daniel Passarella (2003-C)
  - (Mexico) Víctor Manuel Vucetich (2009-A, 2010-A)
  - (Argentina) Antonio Mohamed (2015–16)
