= Clásico Regiomontano =

Mexican football derby

- Location: Monterrey, Nuevo León, Mexico
- Teams: C.F. Monterrey and Tigres UANL
- First meeting: 13 March 1960; Mexican Segunda División; Monterrey 2–0 Nuevo León
- Latest meeting: 12 September 2026; Liga MX; Monterrey 0–0 Tigres UANL
- Stadiums: Estadio BBVA (Monterrey); Estadio Universitario (Tigres UANL)

Statistics
- Total meetings: 129 (official matches)
- Most wins: Tigres UANL (45)
- Most player appearances: André-Pierre Gignac; Nahuel Guzmán (32)
- Top scorer: André-Pierre Gignac (15)
- Largest victory: Tigres UANL 6–2 Monterrey; Apertura (21 August 2004)
- Longest win streak: 8 matches Monterrey (1992–1996)

Monterrey	UANL

The Clásico Regiomontano, Clásico Regio, Clásico del Norte or Clásico Norteño is a football derby in Nuevo León, Mexico, between crosstown rival teams C.F. Monterrey and Tigres UANL. Since the first Clásico in 1974, the two teams have competed over 100 times for bragging rights and city honour. It is known for being one of the most intensely competed derbies in Mexican football, even being regarded by people in the state of Nuevo León and Northern Mexico as the most important Mexican derby. The match is the biggest game of the season in Nuevo León, and every year, fans wait in line for days outside the stadium just to get tickets, which are often priced at two or three times their regular value.

Historically, and thanks to its founders, Monterrey has been associated with the Monterrey-born society of the city; however, today its fans bring together people of all walks of life. Tigres, nicknamed locally as "the people's team," was associated with the working classes; however, today, its supporters include prominent businessmen and politicians from Nuevo León. Paradoxically, in the state's poorest neighborhoods, Monterrey has a large following, just as in the more affluent neighborhoods, there is a significant presence of Tigres fans.

In August 2018, Monterrey and Tigres had the most expensive squads in Liga MX.

== History ==
=== 1960s-1970s: Beginnings in Second Division and first matches ===
The first Clásico Regio was actually played in the Second Division of Mexican professional football. In the 1959-1960 season, the Jabatos de Nuevo León team changed its name for the second round, becoming the Tigres del Universitario de Nuevo León. On the penultimate matchday of the championship, March 13, 1960, the two teams met for the first time. The match has been dubbed by some sports media as the "Clásico 0". Rayados won that first encounter 2-0. The next meeting between these rivals would not be until 1974, when both clubs were already in the First Division, where they tied 3-3.

In 1978, the Mexican Football Federation (FMF) organized the Nuevos Valores tournament, in which participating clubs were required to field at least five youth-team players or debutants, although neither complied with the rule. Monterrey and Tigres shared a group and faced each other twice in July of that year, with the Rayados winning both matches but not the tournament itself, as Leones Negros UdeG was the tournament champion.

The twelfth Clásico was also the first time the two teams faced each other in the knockout phase; the 1978-79 season's playoffs were played using a group elimination system, with the top eight teams in the league divided into two groups of four, with the leader of each group contesting the final. Tigres were placed in Group 2, along with Pumas UNAM and Zacatepec. In the first leg played on June 6, 1979, at the Estadio Universitario, Tigres claimed a narrow victory. In the next Clásico on June 16, 1979, the two teams tied with goals from Raúl Isiordia for Monterrey and Gerónimo Barbadillo for Tigres. Although Tigres shared first place in the group with Pumas UNAM, the latter advanced to the final on goal difference.

=== 1980s-2000s:Growth of rivalry and the "Clásico del Descenso" ===
On September 17, 1983, in a match corresponding to the 22nd round of the 1982-83 season, Monterrey would win with a score of 2-0 over Tigres, ending an unbeaten streak of thirteen consecutive classics without winning that began in 1978. It was the longest unbeaten streak in the history of the rivalry until 1997, when Rayados reached that mark with the same number of editions of the classic without losing.

On March 24, 1996, during the 1995-96 season, one of the most memorable matches of this rivalry took place, in which Monterrey defeated Tigres with a score of 2-1, leaving them with no chance of staying in the First Division, so the match was popularly known as the Clásico del Descenso. Outside of the sporting arena, the match also gained notoriety when the song "Non c'è" by Italian singer Laura Pausini was sung in the stadium while sports commentator Roberto Hernández Jr. regretting the defeat of Tigres.

"Monterrey ganó. Tigres de la Autónoma de Nuevo León está en segunda división. Que Dios bendiga a todos lo que le hicieron daño a este equipo" (Spanish)
"Monterrey won. Tigres de la Autónoma de Nuevo León is in the second division. May God bless all those who harmed this team." (English traduction)
-Roberto Hernández Jr., Mexican sport commentator

In mid-1997, Tigres, who had regained their place in the First Division, faced Monterrey on Matchday 10 of the Invierno tournament on July 19 of that year. They won the match 3-2, not only avenging their defeat from the previous year but also breaking a streak of thirteen consecutive Clásicos without a win.

On February 26, 2000, Tigres won 3-6 at Rayados' Estadio Tecnológico in a match corresponding to the seventh round of the Verano tournament. However, the off-field controversy arose when the score was annulled due to the visiting team fielding Brazilian player Donizete Pantera, whose contract had been compromised. The match was replayed on April 5, ending in a goalless draw.

=== 2000s-2010s: Matchups in Liguilla ===
In 2003, after winning their respective matches in the Clausura playoffs quarterfinals, the two clubs met in the semifinals, their first meeting in this phase since the introduction of short tournaments in Mexican football. In the first leg on June 4, Rayados achieved a historic victory as the visiting team, winning 4-1; three days later in the second leg, Tigres returned the favor by defeating their bitter rivals 2-1 at the Tecnológico. This proved to be insufficient, as the aggregate score ended 5-3 in favor of Monterrey, who later went on to claim their second league title by defeating Monarcas Morelia.

A year after the playoffs, on August 26, 2004, the most lopsided result to date in the Clásicos would occur, with Tigres making the most of their home advantage by winning 6-2 in the second round of the Apertura tournament. Initially, Monterrey was affected by the result, although they would later finish second in the league in that same tournament against Pumas UNAM.

The 2005 Apertura tournament would see a series of classics in the playoff phase for the second time, again in the semifinal round. On December 7, 2005, in the first leg, Tigres won 1-0; and three days later, Monterrey won 2-1 thanks to a famous header from striker Guillermo Franco. Despite the aggregate draw, Rayados advanced to the final thanks to their superior position in the standings, although, as in December, they finished runner-up after losing to Deportivo Toluca 6-3 on aggregate.

In 2013, the two clubs met for the third time in playoff matches, but the first time in the quarterfinals in Clausura tournament. This time, Tigres came in as the overall leader with 30 points and the team with the best defense (they had conceded only 14 goals in 17 matches), while Monterrey barely made it in despite finishing ninth with the same number of goals scored and conceded (22). Technically, they were out of the playoff, but following the relegation of Querétaro (eighth place), it was decided to award that team's spot to Rayados. On May 8, in the first leg, Monterrey won 1-0 at home, and after a 1-1 draw in the second leg following an infamous own goal by Tigres player Israel Jiménez, they reached the semifinals, where they were eliminated by Club América.

In October 2013, Monterrey and Tigres faced each other in a knockout match in the Copa MX held at the Tecnológico. In the first half, the felines led 2-0 with goals from Emanuel Villa and Juninho, but Monterrey was able to react in the second half with a pair of goals from César Delgado and Luis Madrigal. With the score tied 2-2, the match went to a penalty shootout, where Monterrey ended up winning, converting all of their shots while Tigres missed two of theirs, eliminating them from another tournament in less than six months.

On March 5, 2016, in the Clausura tournament, Monterrey defeated Tigres 1-0 in what was the first Clásico Regio played at the new Estadio BBVA Bancomer on March 5. Later in the same tournament, the two teams met in the quarterfinals, and both triumphed as visitors (Monterrey winning 3-1 at the Volcan and Tigres winning 2-1 at the BBVA); the score was 4-3 in favor of Monterrey, who advanced to the final, where they finished runner-up after losing to Club Pachuca.

=== 2010s-2020s: Head-to-head matches in League and CONCACAF finals ===
Throughout 2017, both Tigres and Monterrey demonstrated their enormous progress in both their structural and footballing aspects, with signings and results they hadn't been used to in previous years, such as facing each other in the playoffs of the two annual short tournaments. In the Clausura, Tigres easily defeated Monterrey in the quarterfinals after defeating them 4-1 in the first leg and 2-0 in the second leg. French forward André-Pierre Gignac's performance stood out, scoring four of his six goals, resulting in Tigres exacting revenge for their previous eliminations at the hands of their direct rival. However, they finished runners-up after failing to defeat Club Deportivo Guadalajara in the final. In the Apertura, the two teams met for the first time in a Liga MX final. After a 1-1 draw in the first leg on December 7, Tigres defeated Monterrey in the second leg on December 10 with goals from Eduardo Vargas and Francisco Meza. The latter result gave Tigres their sixth title in their history.

2019 would be a historic year for Nuevo León football, as it was not only the first time that Tigres (winning the final against Club León in the Clausura tournament) and Monterrey (winning the final against Club América in the Apertura tournament) were the champions of the annual tournaments, but they would also face each other in another final, this time in the CONCACAF Champions League. In the first leg held on April 24, 2019, at the Volcán, Monterrey achieved a solid 1-0 victory with a goal by Argentine midfielder Nicolás Sánchez. The return match took place on May 1, 2019, at the BBVA Bancomer. Although it ended in a 1-1 draw, the aggregate score favored the Rayados, earning their fourth international tile and avenging their previous final loss.

In the 2023 Clausura tournament, both clubs faced each other in the semifinals between May 17 and 20 of that year, which ended with a 1-1 draw in the first leg and a 1-1 victory for Tigres in the second leg, resulting in a 2-1 aggregate score. In the final, Tigres faced Guadalajara in a rematch of the 2017 final, although this time they managed to win with an incredible remontada.

In the Leagues Cup tournament, which brings together clubs from Liga MX and Major League Soccer, the two teams met in the round of 16. The match was also the first Clásico Regio to be played in the United States since 2007. With a last-minute penalty kick converted by Spanish forward Sergio Canales, Monterrey won 1-0.

== Team summaries ==
Competition	Matches	Wins		Draws	Goals	
Competition	Matches	MTY	UANL	Draws	MTY	UANL
Liga MX	117	39	43	35	138	151
Liga Premier (Second Division)	1	1	0	0	2	0
Copa MX	2	0	0	2	4	4
CONCACAF Champions Cup	2	1	0	1	2	1
Leagues Cup	1	1	0	0	1	0
Interliga	3	0	2	1	3	5
Torneo Nuevos Valores	2	2	0	0	5	1
All competitions	128	44	45	39	155	162
Exhibition games	14	6	4	4	28	20
All matches	142	50	49	43	183	182

== List of matches ==
– Matches in which Monterrey took the victory.
– Matches in which Tigres UANL took the victory.

#	Home Team	Result	Away Team	Stadium	Date	Tournament
1	Monterrey	2–0	UANL	Unknown	March 13, 1960	1959–1960 Season (2nd Division)
2	UANL	3–3	Monterrey	Estadio Universitario	July 13, 1974	1974–1975 Season
3	Monterrey	2–1	UANL	Estadio Universitario	January 4, 1975	1974–1975 Season
4	UANL	0–4	Monterrey	Estadio Universitario	August 23, 1975	Friendly
5	Monterrey	0–0	UANL	Estadio Universitario	January 31, 1976	1975–1976 Season
6	UANL	0–1	Monterrey	Estadio Universitario	June 12, 1976	1975–1976 Season
7	UANL	1–2	Monterrey	Estadio Universitario	September 25, 1976	1976–1977 Season
8	Monterrey	3–2	UANL	Estadio Universitario	February 5, 1977	1976–1977 Season
9	Monterrey	0–1	UANL	Estadio Tecnológico	August 13, 1977	1977–1978 Season
10	UANL	4–2	Monterrey	Estadio Universitario	January 14, 1978	1977–1978 Season
11	Monterrey	0–0	UANL	Estadio Universitario	September 23, 1978	1978–1979 Season
12	UANL	1–1	Monterrey	Estadio Universitario	February 3, 1979	1978–1979 Season
13	Monterrey	0–1	UANL	Estadio Universitario	June 6, 1979	1978–1979 Season (Playoffs)
14	UANL	1–1	Monterrey	Estadio Universitario	June 16, 1979	1978–1979 Season (Playoffs)
15	Monterrey	1–1	UANL	Estadio Universitario	October 6, 1979	1979–1980 Season
16	UANL	2–1	Monterrey	Estadio Universitario	February 16, 1980	1979–1980 Season
17	Monterrey	2–2	UANL	Estadio Tecnológico	October 4, 1980	1980–1981 Season
18	UANL	3–2	Monterrey	Estadio Universitario	November 6, 1980	Friendly
19	UANL	2–0	Monterrey	Estadio Universitario	March 21, 1981	1980–1981 Season
20	UANL	3–0	Monterrey	Estadio Universitario	October 3, 1981	1981–1982 Season
21	Monterrey	1–1	UANL	Estadio Tecnológico	February 6, 1982	1981–1982 Season
22	Monterrey	1–1	UANL	Estadio Tecnológico	September 18, 1982	1982–1983 Season
23	UANL	2–0	Monterrey	Estadio Universitario	January 22, 1983	1982–1983 Season
24	UANL	0–2	Monterrey	Estadio Universitario	September 17, 1983	1983–1984 Season
25	Monterrey	0–1	UANL	Estadio Tecnológico	January 28, 1984	1983–1984 Season
26	UANL	1–2	Monterrey	Estadio Universitario	August 11, 1984	Friendly
27	Monterrey	2–2	UANL	Estadio Universitario	November 17, 1984	1984–1985 Season
28	Monterrey	2–0	UANL	Estadio Tecnológico	March 30, 1985	1984–1985 Season
29	UANL	0–0	Monterrey	Estadio Universitario	May 1, 1985	Friendly
30	UANL	1–2	Monterrey	Estadio Universitario	September 28, 1985	Friendly
31	UANL	1–1	Monterrey	Estadio Universitario	October 25, 1986	1986–1987 Season
32	Monterrey	0–2	UANL	Estadio Tecnológico	March 21, 1987	1986–1987 Season
33	UANL	2–1	Monterrey	Estadio Universitario	December 12, 1987	1987–1988 Season
34	Monterrey	2–1	UANL	Estadio Tecnológico	May 7, 1988	1987–1988 Season
35	UANL	1–3	Monterrey	Estadio Universitario	January 14, 1989	1988–1989 Season
36	Monterrey	1–0	UANL	Estadio Tecnológico	May 13, 1989	1988–1989 Season
37	UANL	0–2	Monterrey	Estadio Universitario	December 2, 1989	1989–1990 Season
38	Monterrey	0–1	UANL	Estadio Tecnológico	March 31, 1990	1989–1990 Season
39	Monterrey	4–1	UANL	Estadio Tecnológico	December 22, 1990	1990–1991 Season
40	UANL	2–1	Monterrey	Estadio Universitario	April 27, 1991	1990–1991 Season
41	Monterrey	0–1	UANL	Estadio Tecnológico	December 7, 1991	1991–1992 Season
42	UANL	1–1	Monterrey	Estadio Universitario	April 4, 1992	1991–1992 Season
43	UANL	1–1 (4–5 on p.k.)	Monterrey	Estadio Universitario	August 1, 1992	Friendly
44	UANL	1–2	Monterrey	Estadio Universitario	November 7, 1992	1992–1993 Season
45	Monterrey	1–0	UANL	Estadio Tecnológico	March 20, 1993	1992–1993 Season
46	Monterrey	3–3	UANL	Estadio Tecnológico	August 7, 1993	Friendly
47	Monterrey	1–0	UANL	Estadio Tecnológico	November 6, 1993	1993–1994 Season
48	UANL	2–4	Monterrey	Estadio Universitario	March 5, 1994	1993–1994 Season
49	Monterrey	1–0	UANL	Estadio Tecnológico	November 30, 1994	1994–1995 Season
50	UANL	1–2	Monterrey	Estadio Universitario	April 5, 1995	1994–1995 Season
51	Monterrey	2–1	UANL	Estadio Tecnológico	December 2, 1995	1995–1996 Season
52	UANL	1–2	Monterrey	Estadio Universitario	March 24, 1996	1995–1996 Season
53	UANL	2–2 (5–4 on p.k.)	Monterrey	Estadio Universitario	July 27, 1996	1996–1997 Cup
54	UANL	0–4	Monterrey	Estadio Universitario	July 19, 1997	Friendly
55	Monterrey	2–3	UANL	Estadio Tecnológico	September 13, 1997	Invierno 1997
56	UANL	1–0	Monterrey	Estadio Universitario	February 27, 1998	Verano 1998
57	Monterrey	1–1	UANL	Estadio Tecnológico	September 12, 1998	Invierno 1998
58	UANL	3–2	Monterrey	Estadio Universitario	December 19, 1998	Friendly
59	UANL	2–0	Monterrey	Estadio Universitario	February 27, 1999	Verano 1999
60	UANL	2–0	Monterrey	Estadio Universitario	September 22, 1999	Invierno 1999
61	Monterrey	2–3	UANL	Estadio Tecnológico	December 18, 1999	Friendly
–	Monterrey	3–6	UANL	Estadio Tecnológico	February 26, 2000	Verano 2000
62	Monterrey	0–0	UANL	Estadio Tecnológico	April 5, 2000	Verano 2000
63	Monterrey	1–0	UANL	Estadio Tecnológico	September 2, 2000	Invierno 2000
64	UANL	2–2	Monterrey	Estadio Universitario	December 29, 2000	Friendly
65	UANL	2–0	Monterrey	Estadio Universitario	February 10, 2001	Verano 2001
66	Monterrey	0–0	UANL	Estadio Tecnológico	October 20, 2001	Invierno 2001
67	UANL	0–0	Monterrey	Estadio Universitario	March 30, 2002	Verano 2002
68	UANL	0–1	Monterrey	Estadio Universitario	July 20, 2002	Friendly
69	Monterrey	1–1	UANL	Estadio Tecnológico	October 19, 2002	Apertura 2002
70	UANL	2–1	Monterrey	Estadio Universitario	April 12, 2003	Clausura 2003
71	UANL	1–4	Monterrey	Estadio Universitario	June 4, 2003	Clausura 2003 (Playoffs)
72	Monterrey	1–2	UANL	Estadio Tecnológico	June 7, 2003	Clausura 2003 (Playoffs)
73	UANL	3–2	Monterrey	Estadio Universitario	October 22, 2003	Apertura 2003
74	Monterrey	3–3	UANL	Estadio Tecnológico	April 10, 2004	Clausura 2004
75	UANL	6–2	Monterrey	Estadio Universitario	August 21, 2004	Apertura 2004
76	Monterrey	1–1	UANL	Estadio Tecnológico	January 22, 2005	Clausura 2005
77	Monterrey	2–1	UANL	Estadio Tecnológico	September 24, 2005	Apertura 2005
78	UANL	1–0	Monterrey	Estadio Universitario	December 7, 2005	Apertura 2005 (Playoffs)
79	Monterrey	2–1	UANL	Estadio Tecnológico	December 10, 2005	Apertura 2005 (Playoffs)
80	UANL	2–1 (a.e.t.)	Monterrey	Home Depot Center	January 15, 2006	Interliga 2006
81	UANL	2–1	Monterrey	Estadio Universitario	March 12, 2006	Clausura 2006
82	Monterrey	2–1	UANL	Estadio Tecnológico	October 14, 2006	Apertura 2006
83	Monterrey	0–2	UANL	Robertson Stadium	January 3, 2007	Interliga 2007
84	UANL	3–3	Monterrey	Estadio Universitario	March 31, 2007	Clausura 2007
85	UANL	1–0	Monterrey	Estadio Universitario	September 22, 2007	Apertura 2007
86	Monterrey	2–3	UANL	Estadio Tecnológico	March 8, 2008	Clausura 2008
87	Monterrey	1–4	UANL	Estadio Tecnológico	October 18, 2008	Apertura 2008
88	UANL	0–0	Monterrey	Estadio Universitario	April 11, 2009	Clausura 2009
89	UANL	1–2	Monterrey	Estadio Universitario	August 22, 2009	Apertura 2009
90	UANL	1–1	Monterrey	Robertson Stadium	January 6, 2010	Interliga 2010
91	Monterrey	2–1	UANL	Estadio Tecnológico	February 14, 2010	Torneo Bicentenario 2010
92	UANL	0–1	Monterrey	Estadio Universitario	September 11, 2010	Apertura 2010
93	Monterrey	0–0	UANL	Estadio Tecnológico	February 19, 2011	Clausura 2011
94	UANL	0–0	Monterrey	Estadio Universitario	October 22, 2011	Apertura 2011
95	Monterrey	2–0	UANL	Estadio Tecnológico	April 7, 2012	Clausura 2012
96	Monterrey	0–1	UANL	Estadio Tecnológico	November 3, 2012	Apertura 2012
97	UANL	0–1	Monterrey	Estadio Universitario	Abril 27, 2013	Clausura 2013
98	Monterrey	1–0	UANL	Estadio Tecnológico	May 8, 2013	Clausura 2013 (Playoffs)
99	UANL	1–1	Monterrey	Estadio Universitario	May 11, 2013	Clausura 2013 (Playoffs)
100	UANL	3–1	Monterrey	Estadio Universitario	August 10, 2013	Apertura 2013
101	Monterrey	2–2 (4–2 on p.k.)	UANL	Estadio Tecnológico	October 2, 2013	Copa MX Apertura 2013
102	Monterrey	0–0	UANL	Estadio Tecnológico	February 1, 2014	Clausura 2014
103	Monterrey	2–2	UANL	Estadio Tecnológico	October 25, 2014	Apertura 2014
104	UANL	3–0	Monterrey	Estadio Universitario	April 18, 2015	Clausura 2015
105	UANL	3–1	Monterrey	Estadio Universitario	September 19, 2015	Apertura 2015
106	Monterrey	1–0	UANL	Estadio BBVA Bancomer	March 5, 2016	Clausura 2016
107	UANL	1–3	Monterrey	Estadio Universitario	May 11, 2016	Clausura 2016 (Playoffs)
108	Monterrey	1–2	UANL	Estadio BBVA Bancomer	May 14, 2016	Clausura 2016 (Playoffs)
109	UANL	1–1	Monterrey	Estadio Universitario	October 29, 2016	Apertura 2016
110	Monterrey	1–0	UANL	Estadio BBVA Bancomer	April 22, 2017	Clausura 2017
111	UANL	4–1	Monterrey	Estadio Universitario	May 10, 2017	Clausura 2017 (Playoffs)
112	Monterrey	0–2	UANL	Estadio BBVA Bancomer	May 13, 2017	Clausura 2017 (Playoffs)
113	Monterrey	2–0	UANL	Estadio BBVA Bancomer	November 19, 2017	Apertura 2017
114	UANL	1–1	Monterrey	Estadio Universitario	December 7, 2017	Apertura 2017 (Finals)
115	Monterrey	1–2	UANL	Estadio BBVA Bancomer	December 10, 2017	Apertura 2017 (Finals)
116	UANL	2–2	Monterrey	Estadio Universitario	April 28, 2018	Clausura 2018
117	UANL	0–0	Monterrey	Estadio Universitario	September 23, 2018	Apertura 2018
118	Monterrey	1–1	UANL	Estadio BBVA Bancomer	March 9, 2019	Clausura 2019
119	UANL	0–1	Monterrey	Estadio Universitario	April 23, 2019	CONCACAF Champions League (Finals)
120	Monterrey	1–1	UANL	Estadio BBVA Bancomer	May 1, 2019	CONCACAF Champions League (Finals)
121	Monterrey	1–0	UANL	Estadio BBVA Bancomer	May 15, 2019	Clausura 2019 (Playoffs)
122	UANL	1–0	Monterrey	Estadio Universitario	May 18, 2019	Clausura 2019 (Playoffs)
123	Monterrey	0–2	UANL	Estadio BBVA	September 28, 2019	Apertura 2019
124	Monterrey	0–2	UANL	Estadio BBVA	September 26, 2020	Guardianes 2020
125	UANL	2–1	Monterrey	Estadio Universitario	April 24, 2021	Guardianes 2021
126	Monterrey	2–0	UANL	Estadio BBVA	September 19, 2021	Apertura Grita México
127	UANL	2–1	Monterrey	Estadio Universitario	March 19, 2022	Clausura Grita México
128	Monterrey	0–0	UANL	Estadio BBVA	August 20, 2022	Apertura 2022
129	UANL	0–1	Monterrey	Estadio Universitario	March 18, 2023	Clausura 2023
130	UANL	1–1	Monterrey	Estadio Universitario	May 17, 2023	Clausura 2023 (Semi-final)
131	Monterrey	0–1	UANL	Estadio BBVA	May 20, 2023	Clausura 2023 (Semi-final)
132	UANL	0–1	Monterrey	Shell Energy Stadium	August 8, 2023	Leagues Cup (Round of 16)
133	UANL	3–0	Monterrey	Estadio Universitario	September 23, 2023	Apertura 2023
134	Monterrey	1–2	UANL	Shell Energy Stadium	October 14, 2023	Friendly
135	Monterrey	3–3	UANL	Estadio BBVA	April 14, 2024	Clausura 2024
136	UANL	1–2	Monterrey	Estadio Universitario	May 9, 2024	Clausura 2024 (Quarter-final)
137	Monterrey	1–1	UANL	Estadio BBVA	May 12, 2024	Clausura 2024 (Quarter-final)
138	Monterrey	2–1	UANL	Alamodome	October 12, 2024	Friendly
139	Monterrey	4–2	UANL	Estadio BBVA	October 19, 2024	Apertura 2024
140	UANL	2–1	Monterrey	Estadio Universitario	April 12, 2025	Clausura 2025
141	Monterrey	1–1	UANL	Estadio BBVA	November 1, 2025	Apertura 2025
142	UANL	1–0	Monterrey	Estadio Universitario	March 7, 2026	Clausura 2026
143	Monterrey	0–0	UANL	Estadio BBVA	September 12, 2026	Apertura 2026

Note: Originally, Tigres UANL defeated Monterrey in matchday 7 (February 26) of the Verano 2000 Tournament with a score of 6-3; however, this score was annulled by Liga MX due to the lineup of Brazilian striker Donizete Pantera, a footballer who was found to have irregularities in his contract with the UANL team. The match had to be replayed on April 5, and ended in a goalless draw.

== Records ==
=== All-time goalscorers ===
Rank	Player	Club	Goals
1	(France) André-Pierre Gignac	UANL	15
2	(Brazil) Mario de Souza "Bahia"	Monterrey	11
3	(Chile) Claudio Nuñez	UANL	8
4	(Argentina) Walter Gaitán	UANL	8
5	(Mexico) Tomás Boy	UANL	6
6	(Argentina) Guillermo Franco	Monterrey	5
7	(Mexico) Aldo de Nigris	Monterrey	5
8	(Argentina) Nicolás Sánchez	Monterrey	5
9	(Peru) Gerónimo Barbadillo	UANL	4
10	(Chile) Humberto Suazo	Monterrey	4

=== All-time most appearances ===
Rank	Player	Club	Appearances
1	(Argentina) Nahuel Guzmán	UANL	32
2	(France) André-Pierre Gignac	UANL	32
3	(Mexico) Jesús Arellano	Monterrey	31
4	(Argentina) Guido Pizarro	UANL	28
5	(Mexico) Luis Ernesto Pérez	Monterrey	27
6	(Mexico) Hugo Ayala	UANL	26
7	(Mexico) Jesús Dueñas	UANL	26
8	(Mexico) Tomás Boy	UANL	26
9	(Mexico) Carlos Muñoz Remolina	UANL	25
10	(Argentina) José María Basanta	Monterrey	25

== Incidents ==
The rivalry has not been without incidents, whether fights between fans and members of the teams' hooligan groups (known in Mexico as barras bravas) or the players themselves; inside the field, in the stands of the stadiums or outside of them, or even on public roads.

- August 23, 1975: The first major incident occurred during a friendly match held to celebrate 30 years since professional soccer had been established in both Nuevo León and the country. The match ended with a 4-0 victory for Monterrey. However, the game had been suspended after Rayados scored their third goal, and upon resumption, Tigres forward Washington Olivera insulted Monterrey midfielder Luis Montoya, who responded with blows. The rest of the players from both teams also joined the brawl. Enrique Mendoza Guillén, the referee for that match, ejected Montoya and Olivera, as well as Tigres' coach, Claudio Lostanau, and his assistant, Dagoberto Fontes. He had previously ejected Gerónimo Barbadillo for a serious foul on Pepe Sánchez.
- September 23, 2018: Prior to a league match corresponding to matchday 10 of the 2018 Apertura Tournament, a bus carrying members of La Adicción (Monterrey fans) heading to Estadio Universitario encountered another bus carrying members of Libres y Lokos (Tigres fans) on Aztlán Avenue in Monterrey. The Tigres supporters got off the bus and threw rocks at the opposing group, sparking an altercation involving more than 30 people from both sides. A person in a car rammed into the Tigres fans, who then scattered, but one was tackled by members of La Adicción, brutally beaten, and left seriously injured and partially undressed.. The injured fan was taken to the Hospital Universitario and placed in intensive care.

== See also ==
- Clásico Regiomontano Femenil
- List of sports rivalries
