= Primera División de México Apertura 2009 Liguilla Final =

- Event: Apertura 2009 Liguilla
Monterrey	Cruz Azul
(Mexico)	(Mexico)
6	4
- On aggregate

First leg
Monterrey	Cruz Azul
4	3
- Date: December 10, 2009 21:00 (UTC-6)
- Venue: Estadio Tecnológico, Monterrey, Nuevo León
- Referee: Jorge Gasso (Mexico)
- Weather: Rainy

Second leg
Cruz Azul	Monterrey
1	2
- Date: December 13, 2009 18:00 (UTC-6)
- Venue: Estadio Azul, Benito Juárez, Mexico City
- Referee: Marco Antonio Rodríguez (Mexico)

The Apertura 2009 Liguilla Final is a two-legged football match-up to determine the Apertura 2009 champion.

After 17 matches on regular season, and 2 two-legged rounds of Liguilla, Cruz Azul and Monterrey have reached the final.

== Final rules ==
Like other match-ups in the knockout round, the teams will play two games, one at each team's home stadium. As the highest seeded team determined at the beginning of the Liguilla, Cruz Azul was to have home-field advantage for the second leg.

However, the tiebreaking criteria used in previous rounds will not be the same in the final. If the teams remained tied after 90 minutes of play during the 2nd leg, extra time will be used, followed by a penalty shootout if necessary.

== Final summary ==
=== First leg ===
December 10, 2009
21:00

Monterrey	4–3	Cruz Azul
Villa 3' (o.g.); Suazo 47', 88'; Santana 70'	(Report)	Riveros 6', 17'; Villa 34'

Estadio Tecnológico
Monterrey, Nuevo León
Referee: Jorge Eduardo Gasso (Mexico)

Monterrey	Cruz Azul

Monterrey
GK	1	(Mexico) Jonathan Orozco
RB	23	(Panama) Felipe Baloy (yellow card) 33' (substituted off) 46'
CB	5	(Mexico) Duilio Davino
CB	15	(Argentina) José María Basanta
LB	22	(Mexico) William Paredes
DM	4	(Mexico) Diego Martínez (substituted off) 46'
DM	8	(Mexico) Luis Ernesto Pérez (c)
RW	28	(Mexico) Jesús Arellano (substituted off) 60'
LW	20	(Ecuador) Walter Ayoví
RF	11	(Mexico) Aldo de Nigris
LF	26	(Chile) Humberto Suazo
Substitutes
GK	25	(Mexico) Omar Ortíz
DF	2	(Mexico) Severo Meza (substituted on) 46'
DF	21	(Mexico) Diego Ordaz
MF	6	(Mexico) Gerardo Galindo
MF	10	(Paraguay) Osvaldo Martínez (substituted on) 60'
FW	9	(Mexico) Sergio Santana (substituted on) 46' (yellow card) 87'
FW	13	(Mexico) Abraham Carreño
Manager
(Mexico) Víctor Manuel Vucetich

Cruz Azul
GK	1	(Mexico) José de Jesús Corona
RB	16	(Mexico) Rogelio Chávez (substituted off) 76'
CB	4	(Mexico) Julio César Domínguez
CB	13	(Mexico) Melvin Brown
LB	2	(Mexico) Fausto Pinto
DM	6	(Mexico) Gerardo Torrado (c)
DM	7	(Paraguay) Cristian Riveros
RW	21	(Mexico) Jaime Lozano
LW	18	(Mexico) César Villaluz (substituted off) 65'
SS	11	(Mexico) Mario Ortiz (substituted off) 60'
CF	30	(Argentina) Emanuel Villa
Substitutes
GK	25	(Mexico) Yosgart Gutiérrez
DF	20	(Mexico) Alejandro Castro (substituted on) 65' (yellow card) 78'
MF	22	(Mexico) Adrián Cortés
MF	23	(Mexico) Edgar Gerardo Lugo (substituted on) 76'
MF	28	(Mexico) Héctor Gutiérrez
FW	9	(Paraguay) Pablo Zeballos
FW	27	(Mexico) Javier Orozco (substituted on) 60'
Manager
(Mexico) Enrique Meza

Assistant referees
(Mexico) Héctor Manuel Delgadillo
(Mexico) Marcos Quintero Huitrón
Fourth official
(Mexico) Mauricio Rafael Morales Ovalle

=== Second leg ===
December 13, 2009
18:00

Cruz Azul	1–2	Monterrey
Castro 77'	(Report)	de Nigris 54'; Suazo 90'

Estadio Azul
Benito Juárez, Mexico City
Referee: Marco Antonio Rodríguez (Mexico)

Cruz Azul	Monterrey

Cruz Azul
GK	1	(Mexico) José de Jesús Corona
RB	16	(Mexico) Rogelio Chávez
CB	4	(Mexico) Julio César Domínguez (substituted off) 58'
CB	13	(Mexico) Melvin Brown
LB	2	(Mexico) Fausto Pinto
DM	6	(Mexico) Gerardo Torrado (c)
DM	7	(Paraguay) Cristian Riveros
RW	21	(Mexico) Jaime Lozano
LW	18	(Mexico) César Villaluz (yellow card) 33' (substituted off) 65'
SS	11	(Mexico) Mario Ortiz (substituted off) 56'
CF	30	(Argentina) Emanuel Villa
Substitutes
GK	25	(Mexico) Yosgart Gutiérrez
DF	20	(Mexico) Alejandro Castro (substituted on) 65'
MF	5	(Mexico) Gabino Velasco
MF	14	(Chile) Emilio Hernández (substituted on) 58'
MF	23	(Mexico) Edgar Gerardo Lugo
FW	9	(Paraguay) Pablo Zeballos
FW	27	(Mexico) Javier Orozco (substituted on) 56'
Manager
(Mexico) Enrique Meza

Monterrey
GK	1	(Mexico) Jonathan Orozco
RB	2	(Mexico) Severo Meza (yellow card) 57'
CB	5	(Mexico) Duilio Davino
CB	15	(Argentina) José María Basanta
LB	22	(Mexico) William Paredes
DM	6	(Mexico) Gerardo Galindo (substituted off) 83'
DM	8	(Mexico) Luis Ernesto Pérez (c)
RW	9	(Mexico) Sergio Santana (substituted off) 59'
LW	20	(Ecuador) Walter Ayoví
RF	11	(Mexico) Aldo de Nigris (yellow card) 54' (substituted off) 87'
LF	26	(Chile) Humberto Suazo (yellow card) 90'
Substitutes
GK	25	(Mexico) Omar Ortíz
DF	4	(Mexico) Diego Martínez
DF	23	(Panama) Felipe Baloy (substituted on) 83'
MF	10	(Paraguay) Osvaldo Martínez (substituted on) 59'
MF	28	(Mexico) Jesús Arellano
FW	13	(Mexico) Abraham Carreño
FW	17	(Mexico) Jesús Zavala (substituted on) 87'
Manager
(Mexico) Víctor Manuel Vucetich

Assistant referees
(Mexico) José Luis Camargo Callado
(Mexico) Alberto Morín Méndez
Fourth official
(Mexico) José Alfredo Peñaloza Soto
