= 2009 Primera División de México Apertura Liguilla =

Primera División de México Apertura 2009 Liguilla
Tournament details
- Country: Mexico
- Teams: 8

Final positions
- Champions: Monterrey
- Runners-up: Cruz Azul

Tournament statistics
- Matches played: 14
- Goals scored: 41 (2.93 per match)
- Top goal scorer(s): (Mexico) Aldo de Nigris (Monterrey) (Chile) Humberto Suazo (Monterrey); 4 goals

The Liguilla (English: Mini League) of the Primera División de México Apertura 2009 was a final mini-tournament involving eight teams of the Mexican Primera División, in an elimination two-legs playoff.

The final of the Liguilla was on Sunday December 13, between Cruz Azulagainst Monterrey. As the winner, Monterrey became the Apertura 2009 Champion. Also, both finalist got a berth for the 2010–11 CONCACAF Champions League (Monterreyqualified directly to the group stage, while Cruz Azulqualified to the preliminary round).

Defending champions UNAM, were not able to defend their past championship, as they did not qualify to the Liguilla.

== Teams ==
As the 18 teams of the Apertura 2009 were divided in three groups of six teams, it was determined that the two top of each group advanced to the Liguilla, even though having had a low performance at the general table. Alongside those six teams, the two best teams at the general table of the remaining 12, regardless of their group, advanced to the Liguilla.

After having finished last at their group and 17th at the general table, the defending champions, UNAM, did not qualify to this Liguilla

S	Team	Manager	Captain	Performance at the Apertura 2009									
S	Team	Manager	Captain	Pld	W	D	L	GF	GA	GD	Pts	P	Qualified as
1	Toluca	(Mexico) José de la Torre	(Mexico) Zinha	17	11	2	4	32	19	+13	35	1st	First place Group 1
2	Cruz Azul	(Mexico) Enrique Meza Enríquez	(Mexico) Gerardo Torrado	17	11	0	6	35	19	+16	33	2nd	First place Group 3
3	Morelia	(Mexico) Tomás Boy	(Argentina) Mauricio Romero	17	10	3	4	31	15	+16	33	3rd	First place Group 2
4	América	(Mexico) Jesús Ramírez	(Mexico) Pável Pardo	17	8	6	3	29	16	+13	30	4th	Runner-up Group 2
5	Monterrey	(Mexico) Víctor Vucetich	(Mexico) Luis Ernesto Pérez	17	9	3	5	27	16	+11	30	5th	Third place Group 2^{1}
6	Santos Laguna	(Mexico) Sergio Bueno	(Mexico) Oswaldo Sánchez	17	7	6	4	29	24	+5	27	6th	Runner-up Group 3
7	Puebla	(Mexico) José Luis Sánchez Solá	(Mexico) Luis Miguel Noriega	17	6	8	3	19	19	0	26	7th	Fourth place Group 2^{1}
8	San Luis	(Argentina) Miguel Ángel López	(Mexico) Braulio Luna	17	5	6	6	21	24	−3	21	11th^{2}	Runner-up Group 1

1. Best ranked out of the two top of each group.
2. Although having been 11th, as having been runner-up of Group 1, San Luisadvanced.

Locations of the Apertura 2009 Liguilla teams

== Tie-breaking criteria ==
The Liguilla has a particular tie-breaking criteria: In case of a tie in the aggregate score, the higher seeded team will advance.

The exception for this tie-breaking criteria is the final, where the higher seeded team rule is not used. In this case, if the teams remained tied after 90 minutes of play during the second leg of the finals, extra time will be used, followed by a penalty shootout if necessary.

== Bracket ==
The Liguilla had those teams play two games against each other on a home-and-away basis. The winner of each match up was determined by aggregate score.

The teams were seeded one to eight in quarterfinals, and re-seeded one to four in semifinals, depending on their position at the general table of the season. Higher seeded teams play on their home field during the second leg.

Also, the highest seeded can choose when, if Saturday or Sunday, they want to play the second leg. As the rules mention that one half of the matches must be on Wednesday/Saturday, and the other in Thursday/Sunday, the rest of the teams must suit on that choice. The only exception is the final, as it was set to be played at Thursday December 10 the first leg, and Sunday December 13 the second.

Quarterfinals
2	Cruz Azul	4	3	7
7	Puebla	4	2	6
3	Morelia	1	3	4
6	Santos Laguna	2	0	2
1	Toluca^{1}	0	1	1
8	San Luis	1	0	1
4	América	0	1	1
5	Monterrey	1	1	2

Semifinals
2	Cruz Azul	0	2	2
3	Morelia	0	1	1
1	Toluca	0	1	1
4	Monterrey	2	1	3

Final
1	Cruz Azul	3	1	4
2	Monterrey	4	2	6

1. Advanced by best position on the general table.

== Quarter-finals ==
The quarterfinals are scheduled to be played on November 21 or 22 (first leg) and November 28 or 29 (second leg).

Team 1	Agg.	Team 2	1st leg	2nd leg
Toluca^{1} (1) (Mexico)	1–1	(Mexico) (8) San Luis	0–1	1–0
Cruz Azul (2) (Mexico)	7–6	(Mexico) (7) Puebla	4–4	3–2
Morelia (3) (Mexico)	4–2	(Mexico) (6) Santos Laguna	1–2	3–0
América (4) (Mexico)	1–2	(Mexico) (5) Monterrey	0–1	1–1

1. Advanced by best position on the general table.

Kickoffs are given in local time (UTC-6).

=== First leg ===
November 21, 2009
17:00

Monterrey	1 – 0	América
de Nigris 48'	(Report)

Estadio Tecnológico
Monterrey, Nuevo León
Attendance: 36,000
Referee: Ricardo Arellano Nieves (Mexico)
- Before the kickoff, a posthumous homage to Antonio de Nigris, who died on November 16, 2009, took place. He began his youth and senior career in Monterrey.

November 21, 2009
19:00

Puebla	4 – 4	Cruz Azul
Olivera 1'; Acosta 29'; Vigneri 33'; Borgetti 45'	(Report)	Brown 12'; Torrado 22'; Lozano 51' (pen.), 82'

Estadio Cuauhtémoc
Puebla, Puebla
Attendance: 38,000
Referee: Erim Ramírez Ulloa (Mexico)

November 22, 2009
12:00

San Luis	1 – 0	Toluca
Aguilar 77'	(Report)

Estadio Alfonso Lastras
San Luis Potosí, San Luis Potosí
Attendance: 25,000
Referee: Roberto García Orozco (Mexico)

November 22, 2009
17:00

Santos Laguna	2 – 1	Morelia
Ochoa 26', 62'	(Report)	Droguett 50'

Estadio Corona
Torreón, Coahuila
Attendance: 28,000
Referee: Germán Valentín Arredondo Ramírez (Mexico)

=== Second leg ===
November 28, 2009
17:00

Cruz Azul	3 – 2	Puebla
Villaluz 19'; Domínguez 34'; Pinto 52'	(Report)	Olivera 30', 90+1'

Estadio Azul
Benito Juárez, Mexico City
Attendance: 33,000
Referee: José Alfredo Peñaloza (Mexico)

November 28, 2009
21:00

América	1 – 1	Monterrey
Cabañas 42' (pen.)	(Report)	Suazo 79'

Estadio Azteca
Coyoacán, Mexico City
Attendance: 55,000
Referee: Marco Antonio Rodríguez (Mexico)

November 29, 2009
12:00

Toluca	1 – 0	San Luis
Mancilla 78'	(Report)

Estadio Nemesio Díez
Toluca, State of Mexico
Attendance: 26,000
Referee: Benito Armando Archundia (Mexico)

November 29, 2009
17:00

Morelia	3 – 0	Santos Laguna
Tiago 7'; Sabah 39'; Romero 84'	(Report)

Estadio Morelos
Morelia, Michoacán
Attendance: 42,000
Referee: Mauricio Morales (Mexico)

== Semi-finals ==
The semifinals are scheduled to be played on December 2 or 3 (first leg) and December 5 or 6 (second leg).

Team 1	Agg.	Team 2	1st leg	2nd leg
Toluca (1) (Mexico)	1–3	(Mexico) (4) Monterrey	0–2	1–1
Cruz Azul (2) (Mexico)	2–1	(Mexico) (3) Morelia	0–0	2–1

Kickoffs are given in local time (UTC-6).

=== First leg ===
December 2, 2009
21:00

Morelia	0 – 0	Cruz Azul
	(Report)

Estadio Morelos
Morelia, Michoacán
Referee: Roberto García Orozco (Mexico)

December 3, 2009
21:00

Monterrey	2 – 0	Toluca
de Nigris 45', 66'	(Report)

Estadio Tecnológico
Monterrey, Nuevo León
Referee: José Alfredo Peñaloza (Mexico)

=== Second leg ===
December 5, 2009
17:00

Cruz Azul	2 – 1	Morelia
Orozco 58'; Villa 65'	(Report)	Sabah 49'

Estadio Azul
Benito Juárez, Mexico City
Referee: Paul Delgadillo Haro (Mexico)

December 6, 2009
12:00

Toluca	1 – 1	Monterrey
Brizuela 80'	(Report)	Carreño 72'

Estadio Nemesio Díez
Toluca, State of Mexico
Referee: Jorge Eduardo Gasso (Mexico)

== Final ==
The first and second legs of the final are scheduled to be played on December 10 (first leg) and December 13 (second leg).

Team 1	Agg.	Team 2	1st leg	2nd leg
Cruz Azul(1) (Mexico)	4–6	(Mexico) (2) Monterrey	3–4	1–2

Kickoffs are given in local time (UTC-6).

=== First leg ===
December 10, 2009
21:00

Monterrey	4 – 3	Cruz Azul
Villa 3' (o.g.); Suazo 47', 88'; Santana 70'	(Report)	Riveros 6', 17'; Villa 34'

Estadio Tecnológico
Monterrey, Nuevo León
Referee: Jorge Eduardo Gasso (Mexico)

=== Second leg ===
December 13, 2009
18:00

Cruz Azul	1 – 2	Monterrey
Castro 77'	(Report)	de Nigris 54'; Suazo 90'

Estadio Azul
Benito Juárez, Mexico City
Referee: Marco Antonio Rodríguez (Mexico)

== Goalscorers ==
4 goals

- (Mexico) Aldo de Nigris (Monterrey)
- (Chile) Humberto Suazo (Monterrey)

3 goals

- (Uruguay) Nicolás Olivera (Puebla)

2 goals

- (Mexico) Jaime Lozano (Cruz Azul)
- (Mexico) Carlos Ochoa (Santos Laguna)
- (Paraguay) Cristian Riveros (Cruz Azul)
- (Mexico) Miguel Sabah (Morelia)
- (Argentina) Emanuel Villa (Cruz Azul)

1 goal

- (Uruguay) Alejandro Acosta (Puebla)
- (Paraguay) Pablo Aguilar (San Luis)
- (Mexico) Jared Borgetti (Puebla)
- (Mexico) Isaác Brizuela (Toluca)
- (Argentina) Melvin Brown (Cruz Azul)
- (Paraguay) Salvador Cabañas (América)
- (Mexico) Abraham Carreño (Monterrey)
- (Mexico) Alejandro Castro (Cruz Azul)
- (Chile) Hugo Droguett (Morelia)
- (Mexico) Julio Domínguez (Cruz Azul)
- (Chile) Héctor Mancilla (Toluca)
- (Mexico) Fausto Pinto (Cruz Azul)
- (Mexico) Javier Orozco (Cruz Azul)
- (Argentina) Mauricio Romero (Morelia)
- (Mexico) Sergio Santana (Monterrey)
- (Brazil) Wilson Tiago (Morelia)
- (Mexico) Gerardo Torrado (Cruz Azul)
- (Uruguay) Nicolás Vigneri (Puebla)
- (Mexico) César Villaluz (Cruz Azul)

Own goal

- (Argentina) Emanuel Villa (Cruz Azul; for Monterrey)
