= Francisco Javier Cruz =

Mexican footballer (born 1966)

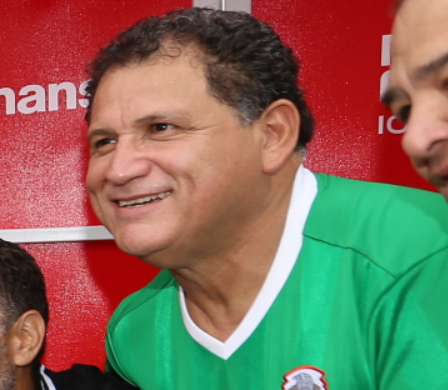
- Cruz in 2017

Personal information
- Full name: Francisco Javier Cruz Jiménez
- Date of birth: 24 May 1966 (age 60)
- Place of birth: Cedral, San Luis Potosí, Mexico
- Height: 1.71 m (5 ft 7 in)
- Position: Forward

Senior career*
Years	Team	Apps	(Gls)
1983–1988	Monterrey	117	(37)
1988–1989	Logroñés	23	(1)
1989–1992	Monterrey	67	(13)
1992–1995	Tigres UANL	48	(9)
1995–1996	Atlante	23	(1)
1996–1997	Tigres UANL	10	(0)
1997–1998	PFC CSKA Sofia	0	(0)
1998–1999	San Antonio Pumas		(2)
1999–2000	Monterrey	5	(1)

International career
1986–1993	Mexico	18	(2)
- * Club domestic league appearances and goals

Francisco Javier Cruz Jiménez (born 24 May 1966) is a Mexican former professional footballer who played for Monterrey and Tigres UANL, becoming one of the few players to be successful in both professional teams from Monterrey. He is nicknamed El Abuelo, which means "The Grandfather".

He also played for a short time in Spain, for CD Logroñés. He scored goals for both Rayados and Tigres, including in the Clásico Regiomontano.

== Early life ==
Born in Cedral, Cruz moved to Monterrey at the age of 5. Cruz is the 8th youngest of 10 children. Although Cruz demonstrated a passion and skill for the sport, his dad discouraged him from pursuing a career in football.

== Club career ==
=== C.F. Monterrey ===
He was instrumental in the conquest of the first championship for Rayados. Topscorer for that Mexico 1986 tournament (tied with Sergio Lira from Tampico with 14 goals). He also served the assist to Sergio "Alvin" Perez's goal that kept the team from being relegated in May 1999.

=== Tigres UANL ===
He played with Tigres UANL for a while, where he scored many goals. He was instrumental in returning the team to the First Division after its privatization.

In April 1998, he signed with the San Antonio Pumas of the USISL.

== International career ==
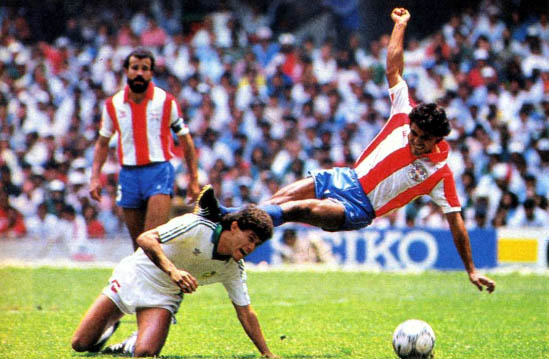
Cruz (in white) and Cabañas during Mexico's 1986 FIFA World Cup match against Paraguay

"El Abuelo" Cruz also played several games with Mexico, including the 1986 FIFA World Cup quarterfinal against West Germany in the Estadio Universitario of Monterrey. In extra time, he scored a goal that the referee annulled due to an offside ruling involving another player. The game ended on penalty kicks with Mexico eliminated.

He missed the 1994 FIFA World Cup due to an injury which he suffered by scoring the goal that qualified Mexico into the competition.

No.	Date	Venue	Opponent	Score	Result	Competition	Ref.
1.	May 13, 1987	Toluca, Mexico	Bermuda	6–0	Win	Olympic Games Qualification	
2.	February 10, 1993	Monterrey, Mexico	Romania	2–0	Win	Friendly	
3.	May 9, 1993	Toronto, Canada	Canada	2–1	Win	1994 FIFA World Cup qualification	

== Retirement ==
He retired as a player on May 9, 1999.

As of April 16, 2006. He tried to get a Team as a coach, but he never got to be one, He also started working with Tigres UANL, as a recruiter but he let that down also, According to an interview, he aspires to coach a team in the Liga de Ascenso.

== Personal life ==
Cruz gave himself the nickname El Abuelo in his teenage years in honor of his late grandfather.

In an interview, Cruz claimed to have fell into a depression following his retirement. His mental state worsened following the death of his mother due to a heart attack in 2004 and his father's death the year later. Shortly after the death of his parents, Cruz developed an eating disorder and reached a weight of 313 pounds. Cruz underwent gastric bypass surgery after being diagnosed with high blood pressure and diabetes.

Cruz has three daughters from a previous marriage.
