= Cristian Reyes (footballer) =

Mexican footballer (born 2006)

Personal information
- Full name: Cristian Isaac Reyes Bermúdez
- Date of birth: 10 April 2006 (age 20)
- Place of birth: Tepic, Nayarit, Mexico
- Height: 1.64 m (5 ft 5 in)
- Position: Attacking midfielder

Team information
- Current team: Monterrey
- Number: 194

Youth career
- 2019: Guadalajara
- 2021–: Monterrey

Senior career*
Years	Team	Apps	(Gls)
2024–	Monterrey	10	(0)
- * Club domestic league appearances and goals as of 10 October 2026

Cristian Isaac Reyes Bermúdez (born 10 April 2006) is a Mexican professional footballer who plays as an attacking midfielder for Liga MX club Monterrey.

== Club career ==
=== Monterrey ===
Reyes began his career at the academy of Guadalajara before moving to Monterrey, where he progressed through all categories, until he made his professional debut on 8 July 2024, playing the full match in a 1–0 win against Pachuca.

== Career statistics ==
=== Club ===
As of match played on 10 October 2026

Appearances and goals by club, season and competition
Club	Season	League			Cup		Continental		Intercontinental		Other		Total	
Club	Season	Division	Apps	Goals	Apps	Goals	Apps	Goals	Apps	Goals	Apps	Goals	Apps	Goals
Monterrey	2024–25	Liga MX	2	0	—		—		—		—		2	0
Monterrey	2025–26	Liga MX	7	0	—		2 (Note: Appearances in CONCACAF Champions Cup)	0	—		—		9	0
Monterrey	2026–27	Liga MX	1	0	—		—		—		—		1	0
Career total			10	0	0	0	2	0	0	0	0	0	12	0
