= Libres y Lokos =

Libres Y Lokos
| Origins | Mexico |
| Club | Tigres UANL |
| Stadium | Estadio Universitario |
| Name | Libres y lokos |
| Nicknames | "Incomparables" (The Incomparable) |
| Type | Group of Animation |
| Slogan | Piu Avanti |
| Ideology | Mentality, Attitude, Codes, Pride, Respect, Value. |
| Foundation | October 31, 1998 |
| Time | 1998 – Present |
| No. of Members | 3,000 approx |
| Rivalries | La Adiccion (CF Monterrey); La Rebel (Pumas UNAM); La 51 (Club Atlas) |
| Website | http://www.libresylokos.net |

Libres y Lokos is the official animation group of Liga MX side Tigres UANL.

== Origins and history ==
Libres y Lokos is one of the most numerous fan groups in Mexican football.

This fan group was born before the start of Invierno 1998. This was right after the "Tigremania" movement, that was caused by the team's promotion to Liga MX after a brief stint in Ascenso MX, started. This group was started by young fans, influenced by South American Barras Bravas, who wanted to show the passion for their club and support it in a different way than a typical fan. Chants and flags were early characteristics of the group.

The Libres y Lokos started in the "Sol General" part of the Estadio Universitario, which is located in the northern upper part of the stadium. The upper part of the stadium was not protected by any kind of fence or barrier which allowed the group members to move freely throughout the top ring of the stadium. This created some security problems since it meant the Libres y Lokos could confront visiting groups that are usually located in the upper part, opposite of the Libres y Lokos zone. The Universidad Autónoma de Nuevo León, which owns the stadium, decided to put barriers in the "Sol General" part of the stadium. Members of the Libres y Lokos group then started to climb and throw down fences. As a consequence, the club moved the group to the bottom corner of the stadium, or 6A Zona Gol Norte, arguing that the aging stadium would not support the constant jumping of the fans. The Libres y Lokos agreed, in exchange of a secure and guaranteed zone for the group. The 6A gate is now reserved for the Libres y Lokos and the tickets provided by Tigres to the group are sold through Libres y Lokos.

The Libres y Lokos have called the attention of local and international media numerous times because of its amazing show of support and fidelity. The group is characterized for always showing up to Tigres away games and selling out the Estadio Universitario in every home game, regardless of the team's result. They are considered the reason why the Estadio Universitario is such a difficult stadium to play in for away teams. The Libres y Lokos are also known for their famous "Invasiones", or invasions, to numerous away stadiums. Most notably the Tigres v. San Luis game of the Clausura 2013 season, where Tigres filled the Alfonso Lastras with 23,000 away fans. Libres y Lokos also took 1,000 fans from Monterrey to Buenos Aires for the match against River Plate in the Copa Libertadores 2015. Numerous clubs have attempted to stop the "invasions". Club America blocked ticket systems in Monterrey and raised prices, Pumas UNAM club board directed local police to turn away buses from Monterrey that were coming into Estado de Mexico, and Atletico San Luis decided to prevent ticket sales to people who originated from Monterrey by asking for identification.

== Rivalries ==
The Libres y Lokos were growing rapidly with the passing of the years, with this problems also arose. The rivalry with La Adiccion, supporter group of local rivals CF Monterrey, was getting incontrollable. These two groups would always fight every time both clubs met. Local media started to criticize these movements, especially the Libres y Lokos. Sinergia Deportiva's, Club Tigres owners, response was to close out the 6A gate area from the rest of the stands by putting up fences around the zone where the group was located. This was also caused by a pitch invasion in the Invierno 2001 final. The group has been banned from the stadium on three occasions due to separate incidents.

Libres y Lokos members participated in a 2007 documentary called "La Horda", or the horde, which explained the meaning behind numerous supporter groups in Mexico and their stories. The group starred in the documentary, where they showed a couple of Libres y Lokos members fighting with Club Pachuca players in a Bolivian airport while both groups were traveling through South America. Both parties exchanged words and punches until airport security intervened.

Libres y Lokos used to have a very strong friendship with Pumas UNAM supporter group La Rebel in which they exchanged shirts and organized events together. This bond ended when members of both groups started to disapprove of the friendship. The rivalry between both groups started when members of La Rebel arrived at the Estadio Universitario chanting against the Libres y Lokos before a match in 2008. This sparked a fight outside the stadium where some members of La Rebel were injured. This was also the last incident recorded in the Estadio Universitario to date.

The group's popularity has also proved to be counterproductive. Many supporter groups around the country have started to envy the group, causing incidents whenever Libres y Lokos visits an away stadium. Events in Veracruz, Torreon, San Luis, and Monterrey have damaged the group's reputation, leading national media to find the Libres y Lokos, and Tigres fans in general, violent and dangerous. Although, many Tigres fans have alleged that these fights have been caused by home fans. Pumas La Rebel and Atlas La 51 have threatened the Libres y Lokos on several occasions.

== Symbols ==
The fans and players do the characteristic signal of the group, which is done by forming two L's with both hands. André-Pierre Gignac, French Tigres striker, made the hand signal while celebrating a goal in a friendly match against Germany in the Stade de France. Many other players have also done the signal in recognition of the group.

== Mark ==
Libres y Lokos is a registered mark that commercializes products. It has an official shop called La Cueva Store.
