= Fernando Guajardo =

Chilean footballer and manager

Personal information
- Full name: Fernando Hernán Guajardo Leiva
- Date of birth: 19 April 1968 (age 58)
- Place of birth: San Miguel, Santiago, Chile
- Position: Forward

Team information
- Current team: San Luis (youth) (manager)

Youth career
- Palestino

Senior career*
Years	Team	Apps	(Gls)
1987–1991	Palestino	0	(0)
1989	→ Deportes Valdivia (loan)	17	(3)
1990	→ Curicó Unido (loan)		(5)
1991–1992	Unión La Calera		(9)
1993–1994	Everton	25	(1)
1995	Santiago Wanderers	18	(1)
1996	Unión La Calera	–	(–)
1997–1998	Magallanes		(6)
1999	Unión San Felipe		(2)
2000–2001	Persija Jakarta		(1)
2001–2002	Gelora Putra Delta		(7)
2002	Persik Kediri		
2003–2005	PSDS Deli Serdang		(2)

Managerial career
- 2008–2011: Unión La Calera (youth)
- 2012–2015: San Luis (youth)
- 2015: Unión San Felipe (caretaker)
- 2015–2016: Unión San Felipe (youth)
- 2017–2018: San Luis U19
- 2019: San Luis (women)
- 2020–2021: Deportes Vallenar
- 2022–2024: San Luis (youth)
- 2024: San Luis (caretaker)
- 2025: Provincial Osorno
- 2025–: San Luis (caretaker)
- * Club domestic league appearances and goals

Fernando Hernán Guajardo Leiva (born 19 April 1968), is a Chilean football manager and former professional player who played as a forward for clubs in Chile and Indonesia. He works in the San Luis de Quillota youth system.

== Playing career ==
Born in San Miguel, Santiago, Guajardo is a product of Palestino youth system, making appearances for the first team in Copa Chile. As a member of Palestino, he had stints on loan at Deportes Valdivia and Curicó Unido.

In Chile, he also played for Unión La Calera, Everton, Santiago Wanderers, Magallanes and Unión San Felipe.

As a member of Santiago Wanderers, he won the 1995 Segunda División, alongside players such as Claudio Núñez, Luis Guarda and Jorge Almirón.

In 2000, he moved to Indonesia and played for Persija Jakarta, Gelora Putra Delta, Persik Kediri and PSDS Deli Serdang.

== Coaching career ==
Guajardo has an extensive career as coach at the youth ranks of Unión La Calera, San Luis and Unión San Felipe, with an experience as caretaker in the last. From 2020 to 2021 he had an experience as head coach in Deportes Vallenar in both the Segunda División Profesional and the Tercera A.

Since September 2022, he works as head coach of the San Luis youth ranks. In March 2024, he assumed as interim coach after Juan Manuel López was released.

== Honours ==
Santiago Wanderers

- Primera B de Chile: 1995
