= Humberto Suazo =

Chilean footballer (born 1981)

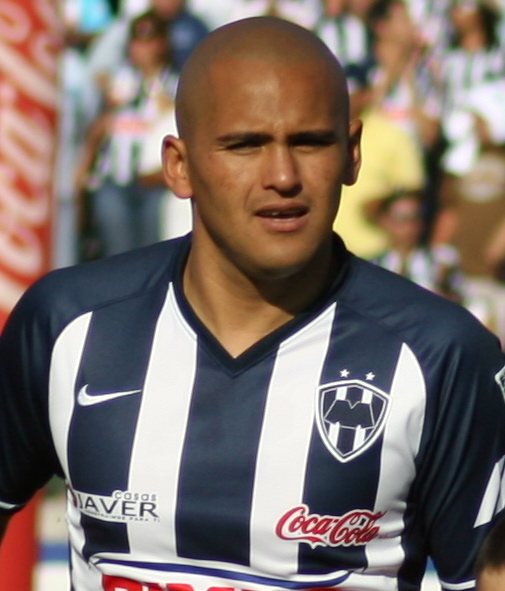
- Suazo with Monterrey in 2008

Personal information
- Full name: Humberto Andrés Suazo Pontivo
- Date of birth: 10 May 1981 (age 45)
- Place of birth: San Antonio, Chile
- Height: 1.71 m (5 ft 7 in)
- Position: Striker

Team information
- Current team: San Luis de Quillota (manager)

Youth career
- 1987–1995: Club Torino
- 1996–2001: Universidad Católica

Senior career*
Years	Team	Apps	(Gls)
2000–2001	Universidad Católica	0	(0)
2000	→ Ñublense (loan)	4	(1)
2001	→ Magallanes (loan)	6	(0)
2002	San Antonio Unido	30	(23)
2003	San Luis de Quillota	40	(39)
2004–2005	Audax Italiano	62	(40)
2006–2007	Colo-Colo	54	(52)
2007–2015	Monterrey	219	(102)
2010	→ Real Zaragoza (loan)	17	(6)
2015	Colo-Colo	17	(3)
2017–2019	San Antonio Unido	22	(10)
2020	Deportes Santa Cruz	3	(0)
2020–2021	Deportes La Serena	41	(11)
2021	Raya2	10	(1)
2022	Deportes La Serena	27	(2)
2023–2025	San Luis de Quillota	60	(23)
Total		612	(313)

International career
2005–2013	Chile	60	(21)

Managerial career
- 2025: San Luis de Quillota (assistant)
- 2026–: San Luis de Quillota
- * Club domestic league appearances and goals

Humberto Andrés Suazo Pontivo (Spanish pronunciation: [umˈbeɾto ˈswaso]; born 10 May 1981), nicknamed Chupete (Lollipop) or El hombre venido del planeta gol (The man who came from "Planet Goal"), is a Chilean football manager and former footballer who played as a striker. He is the head coach San Luis de Quillota.

Widely regarded as one of the finest Chilean footballers of his generation, Suazo established himself as a prolific goalscorer, noted for his intelligent movement, and clinical finishing ability with both feet. He achieved considerable success at club level, most notably with Colo-Colo in Chile and Monterrey in Mexico. Across two spells with Colo-Colo, he won four league titles and finished as the top scorer of the 2006 Copa Sudamericana, a performance that earned him the IFFHS World's Best International Goal Scorer award that same year.

At Monterrey, Suazo established himself as one of Mexican football's leading forwards and became the club's all-time leading scorer. He won two league championships and three CONCACAF Champions League titles, cementing his status as one of the most influential players in the club's history.

At the international level, Suazo earned 60 caps and scored 21 goals. He represented Chile at the Copa América in 2007 and 2011, as well as at the 2010 FIFA World Cup.

== Early life ==
At six years old, Suazo's father took him to play with Club Torino in his hometown of San Antonio. His father had made a name for himself playing with the same team.

In December 1995, Suazo tried out for Universidad Católica. In March of the following year, he was part of the club's youth system. However, Suazo's time spent there was troubled. He did not like to practice and at any given chance he would leave the facilities and return to San Antonio. Suazo later admitted he wasted the opportunity the club gave him.

== Club career ==
=== Early career ===
In 2000, Universidad Católica loaned Suazo out to Chilean second division, Ñublense. His professional debut came against Magallanes, the club he would later play for, and he scored his first goal. At the end of the year, he fractured his fibula and was sidelined for seven months. The injury also kept him out of the 2001 FIFA World Youth Championship. In 2000, he won the Milk Cup, an international youth football tournament held annually in Northern Ireland.

At the end of 2001, no longer part of Universidad Católica, Suazo played for Magallanes. He would go on to join his hometown club San Antonio Unido in 2002. In 2003, Suazo turned heads with his new club San Luis Quillota of the Chilean third division, when he scored 40 goals in one season.

The next two seasons Suazo would spend with Audax Italiano. In early 2004, Suazo suffered another major injury which kept him out for a significant amount of time. With Audax, Suazo scored 40 goals before being transferred to Colo-Colo.

=== Colo-Colo ===
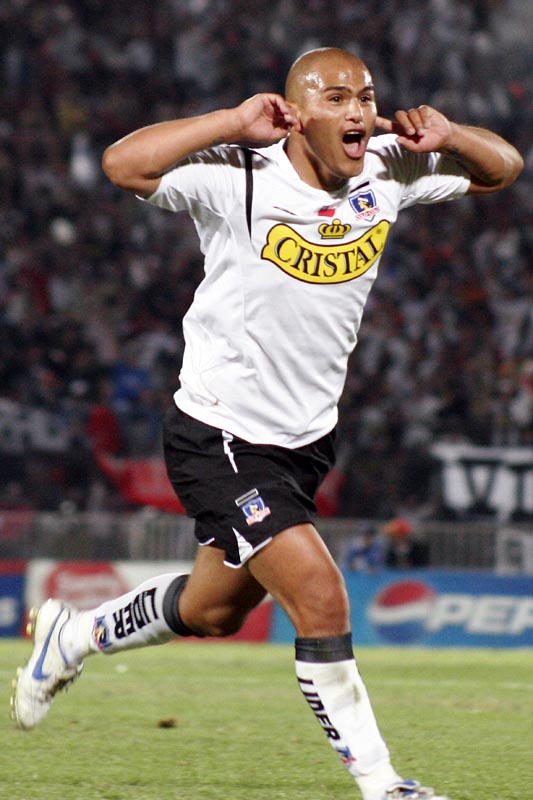
Suazo's trademark celebration.

Suazo began his career with Colo-Colo just in time for the Copa Libertadores 2006. Even though Colo-Colo exited the tournament early, Suazo showed his ability by scoring a hat-trick against Chivas.

In the 2006 Apertura tournament in Chile, Suazo led all scorers with 14 goals in 33 games on the way to capturing Colo-Colo's 24th national championship.

Colo-Colo, with the help of Suazo's tournament-leading 10 goals in 12 games, reached the finals of Copa Sudamericana 2006. On the way to the finals, he netted a hat-trick against Gimnasia LP. Suazo dazzled fans and scouts alike throughout the tournament, which raised questions about him staying with the team in 2007. Teams such as Santos Laguna of Mexico and Catania of Italy were both rumored to be interested in the player. However, Colo-Colo put those rumors to rest when they bought the rest of Suazo's ownership from his former club, Audax, on 15 December 2006, for one million US dollars. Ten percent of that fee ($100,000) went to Suazo's pocket. The move also assured his services to the club until June 2007.

In the 2006 Clausura tournament final, Colo-Colo played again against Suazo's former team, Audax. Colo-Colo won the first leg 3–0, with Suazo scoring his thirteenth goal of the season, and the second leg 3–2, with Suazo scoring the first two goals .

In the 2007 Apertura tournament, Suazo finished as the leading goal scorer, also scoring in the final match against Palestino. His lone goal, coming in the 79th minute, gave Colo-Colo their 26th tournament win, cementing his place in Colo-Colo history.

=== Monterrey ===
After months of speculation over where Suazo would end up after his contract expired in June, Suazo was finally sold for $5 million to Mexican club, Monterrey. The fee paid by the Mexican team is one of the highest for a Chilean player coming out of Chile.

Suazo's performance during his first tournament wasn't what was expected (only three goals in twelve games) and combined with conflicts with teammates and coaches. It led to speculations that Suazo had been sold to Argentine club Independiente. However, the deal fell through once the Argentine club refused to pay $8 million for the transfer. On 4 January, Humberto called for a press conference, and in front of television cameras and news media, he acknowledged the fact that his performance and attitude wasn't positive during his first 6 months with the club, but that from now on, he was determined to change things. He was going to take responsibility for his actions and commit himself to work hard to achieve better results.

On 6 April, Suazo scored four goals against Veracruz, in his team's 7–2 victory. This feat is the most a player from Monterrey has achieved in one game (tied with Milton Carlos). In his second season at Monterrey, he ended up as top goalscorer of the Mexican tournament with a total of 13 goals in 17 games. Suazo then scored three more goals in the playoffs, one in the quarter-final first leg against Chivas, and two more against Santos Laguna in the semi-finals, though Monterrey were unable to advance to the final. The next tournament was a pretty poor one for both Suazo and Monterrey, failing to advance to the playoffs. During the following tournament, Clausura 2009, Suazo helped Monterrey achieve the quarter-finals where they lost against Puebla. Suazo scored a goal in the 1st leg which Monterrey lost 3–1.

In the Apertura 2009 final, Suazo became a key player in the title. In the final's first leg, he gave an extraordinary game and helped Monterrey get back from a 3–1 loss at halftime in their home stadium to win 4–3, with Suazo scoring two of the goals. In the second leg, he made a pass for his colleague, Aldo de Nigris, and then scored a goal himself in injury time to secure the title. Rayados won by an aggregate score of 6–4 against Cruz Azul, taking the championship.

=== Real Zaragoza ===
On 8 January 2010, he left Monterrey and signed for the Spanish club Real Zaragoza on a loan deal with an option for Zaragoza to buy Suazo for 10 million euros. He made his debut for Zaragoza in a 0–0 draw against Xerez at the La Romareda stadium.

As of 20 May 2010, Suazo's card still belongs to Monterrey and its worth has been raised to $25 million, provided that Real Zaragoza does not make valid their option to buy his card at $14 million.

=== Return to Monterrey ===
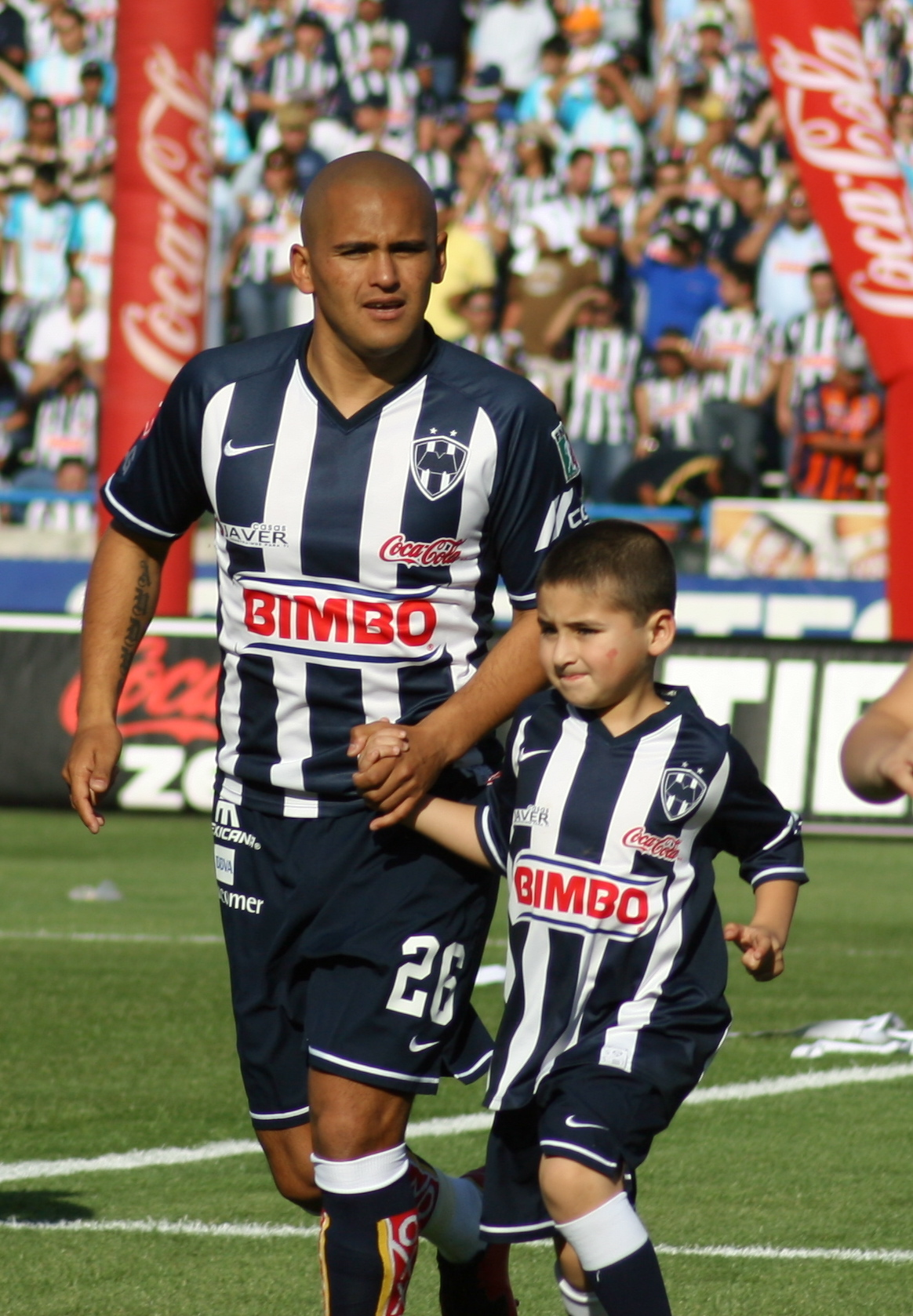
Humberto Suazo he is the top historical scorer of Monterrey with 121 goals in 255 appearances

Suazo made a surprise return to Monterrey for the Apertura 2010, after Zaragoza decided not to pay for Suazo's card. In this tournament he exceeded all the expectations from fans and the media, scoring 10 goals in the tournament and giving Monterrey their fourth league title in December 2010, plus obtaining the 2010-11 CONCACAF Champions League against Real Salt Lake the following May, making Monterrey the CONCACAF representative in the 2011 FIFA Club World Cup, He followed this success by winning the 2011–12 CONCACAF Champions League for the second time in a row, defeating Santos Laguna. Monterrey had a respectable participation in the 2012 FIFA Club World Cup, where they finished in third place. Suazo along with Aldo de Nigris, Jose Basanta and rising star Jesus Manuel Corona would lead Rayados to a third straight CONCACAF title when they won the 2012–13 CONCACAF Champions League. He scored the 4th goal in the final against Santos Laguna in what was a rematch of last season's final. Rayados reached the semi-finals of the Clausura 2013 tournament but lost to Club America. Rayados finished in a disappointing 5th place at the 2013 FIFA Club World Cup, with the highlight being a 5–1 win against Al-Ahly which remains the biggest scoring margin in the history of the FIFA Club World Cup. The following year Monterrey had a forgettable Clausura 2014 season. They reached the semi-finals of the Apertura 2014 but lost 3–0 on aggregate against America in what would prove to be Suazo's final game for Rayados, finishing with a total of 121 goals in 252 appearances and six official titles

=== Later career ===
In 2015, Suazo returned to Colo-Colo and announced his retirement from football on 14 January 2016. In 2017, however, he joined his former club San Antonio Unido, who were playing in the Segunda División. He left the club in early 2018 and returned in July 2019.

In 2020, Suazo played for Deportes Santa Cruz. In the second half of the same year, he switched to Deportes La Serena.

On 30 August 2021, Suazo returned to México and joined Raya2, the official reserve team of Monterrey. After participating in ten games and scoring one goal, he left the team as announced in December 2021.

Back to Chile, Suazo rejoined Deportes La Serena in December 2021.

In November 2022, Suazo returned to San Luis de Quillota after his stint in 2003. On 14 October 2025, he announced his retirement after the match against Deportes Copiapó on 24 October of the same year.

== International career ==
Suazo had also become a fixture with his international side. In 2006, he scored 17 goals in national and international matches, surpassing Peter Crouch by one goal for the "World's Top Goal Scorer Award". His four international goals all came in friendlies. He scored goals against New Zealand and Sweden. His other two goals came in the form of penalties versus Ivory Coast and Colombia. In January 2007, he was awarded world's top goal scorer of 2006 by the International Federation of Football History & Statistics in Salzburg, Austria. He was also awarded the Silver Football as the world's second first league top scorer with 34 goals, behind Klaas-Jan Huntelaar of Ajax with 35 goals.

Suazo played for Chile in the Copa América 2007, scoring three goals, two in his first match against Ecuador, and one in the quarter-final match against Brazil. He finished as CONMEBOL's top scorer of the 2010 FIFA World Cup qualification with 10 goals, one ahead of Brazilian striker Luís Fabiano.

== Coaching career ==
Still a player of San Luis de Quillota, Suazo graduated as a football manager at INAF (National Institute of Football, Sports and Physical Activity of Chile) in December 2024.

After suffering a serious knee injury in June 2025, Suazo briefly joined the technical staff of Fernando Guajardo, serving as a player-coach for San Luis de Quillota.

On 20 November 2025, Suazo was appointed as the manager of San Luis de Quillota since the 2026 season.

== Personal life ==
His daughters, Grettel and Arantza, are professional footballers who have represented Chile at youth level.

His youngest son, Jesús, known as Chuy, was born in Mexico and is a player from the San Luis de Quillota youth ranks.

== Career statistics ==
=== Club ===
As of 8 December 2014

Appearances and goals by club, season and competition
Club	Season	League		National Cup		Continental		Other		Total	
Club	Season	Apps	Goals	Apps	Goals	Apps	Goals	Apps	Goals	Apps	Goals
Colo-Colo	Apertura 2006	21	19			2 (Note: Appearances in Copa Libertadores)	3	–		23	22
Colo-Colo	Clausura 2006	16	15			12 (Note: Appearances in Copa Sudamericana)	10	–		28	25
Colo-Colo	Apertura 2007	17	18			7	5	–		24	23
Colo-Colo	Total	54	52			21	18	0	0	75	70
Monterrey	2007–08	31	19			–		2 (Note: Appearances in InterLiga)	1	33	20
Monterrey	2008–09	32	14			–		–		32	14
Monterrey	2009–10	22	11			–		–		22	11
Monterrey	Total	85	44			0	0	2	1	87	45
Real Zaragoza	2009–10	17	6	0	0	–		–		17	6
Monterrey	2010–11	35	21			8 (Note: Appearances in CONCACAF Champions League)	4	-	-	43	25
Monterrey	2011–12	31	13			9	7	1 (Note: Appearances in FIFA Club World Cup)	1	41	21
Monterrey	2012–13	32	10			9	5	0	0	41	15
Monterrey	2013–14	19	12			–		2	1	21	13
Monterrey	2014–15	17	2			–		–		17	2
Monterrey	Total	134	58			26	16	3	2	163	76
Career total		290	160			47	34	5	3	342	197

=== International ===
Appearances and goals by national team and year
National team	Year	Apps	Goals
Chile	2005	3	0
Chile	2006	5	4
Chile	2007	14	4
Chile	2008	10	3
Chile	2009	9	6
Chile	2010	4	1
Chile	2011	9	3
Chile	2012	5	0
Chile	2013	1	0
Total		60	21

Scores and results list Chile's goal tally first, score column indicates score after each Suazo goal.

List of international goals scored by Humberto Suazo
No.	Date	Venue	Opponent	Score	Result	Competition
1	24 March 2006	Estadio El Teniente, Rancagua, Chile	New Zealand	1–1	4–1	Friendly
2	30 May 2006	Stade Jean-Bouloumie, Vittel, France	Ivory Coast	1–1	1–1	Friendly
3	2 June 2006	Rasunda Stadion, Stockholm, Sweden	Sweden	1–1	1–1	Friendly
4	16 August 2006	Estadio Nacional de Chile, Santiago, Chile	Colombia	1–0	1–2	Friendly
5	27 June 2007	Polideportivo Cachamay, Puerto Ordaz, Venezuela	Ecuador	1–1	3–2	2007 Copa América
6	27 June 2007	Polideportivo Cachamay, Puerto Ordaz, Venezuela	Ecuador	2–2	3–2	2007 Copa América
7	7 July 2007	Estadio Olímpico Luis Ramos, Puerto la Cruz, Venezuela	Brazil	1–5	1–6	2007 Copa América
8	17 October 2007	Estadio Nacional de Chile, Santiago, Chile	Peru	1–0	2–0	2010 FIFA World Cup qualification
9	18 June 2008	Estadio Olímpico Luis Ramos, Puerto la Cruz, Venezuela	Venezuela	1–1	3–2	2010 FIFA World Cup qualification
10	18 June 2008	Estadio Olímpico Luis Ramos, Puerto la Cruz, Venezuela	Venezuela	3–2	3–2	2010 FIFA World Cup qualification
11	10 September 2008	Estadio Nacional de Chile, Santiago, Chile	Colombia	2–0	4–0	2010 FIFA World Cup qualification
12	29 March 2009	Estadio Monumental "U", Lima, Peru	Peru	2–0	3–1	2010 FIFA World Cup qualification
13	6 June 2009	Estadio Defensores del Chaco, Asunción, Paraguay	Paraguay	2–0	2–0	2010 FIFA World Cup qualification
14	9 September 2009	Estádio de Pituaçu, Salvador, Brazil	Brazil	1–2	2–4	2010 FIFA World Cup qualification
15	9 September 2009	Estádio de Pituaçu, Salvador, Brazil	Brazil	2–2	2–4	2010 FIFA World Cup qualification
16	10 October 2009	Estadio Atanasio Girardot, Medellín, Colombia	Colombia	2–1	4–2	2010 FIFA World Cup qualification
17	14 October 2009	Estadio Monumental David Arellano, Santiago, Chile	Ecuador	1–0	1–0	2010 FIFA World Cup qualification
18	30 May 2010	Estadio Municipal de Concepción, Concepción, Chile	Israel	1–0	3–0	Friendly
19	19 June 2011	Estadio Monumental David Arellano, Santiago, Chile	Estonia	3– 0	4–0	Friendly
20	17 July 2011	Estadio del Bicentenario, San Juan, Argentina	Venezuela	1–1	1–2	2011 Copa América
21	11 October 2011	Estadio Monumental David Arellano, Santiago, Chile	Peru	4–2	4–2	2014 FIFA World Cup qualification

== Honours ==
=== Club ===
San Luis de Quillota

- Tercera División A de Chile: 2003

Colo-Colo

- Primera División de Chile: 2006-A, 2006-C, 2007-A, 2015-A
- Copa Sudamericana runner-up: 2006

Monterrey

- Mexican Primera División: Apertura 2009, Apertura 2010
- CONCACAF Champions League: 2010–11, 2011–12, 2012–13

=== Individual ===
- Tercera División A de Chile top scorer: 2003
- Torneo Apertura de Chile Golden Boot: 2006, 2007
- IFFHS World's Top Goal Scorer: 2006
- Mexican Primera División Torneo Clausura top scorer: 2008
- Copa Sudamericana top scorer: 2006
- 2010 FIFA World Cup qualification (CONMEBOL) top scorer
- Primera División de México Apertura 2009 Liguilla: top scorer, tied with teammate Aldo de Nigris (4 Goals)
- Primera División de México Apertura 2009: Balon de Oro for Best Player of the Tournament.
- Apertura 2010: Balon de Oro for Best Player of the Tournament.
- Apertura 2010: Best Striker of the Tournament
- 2011–12 CONCACAF Champions League top scorer
- TNT Sports Chile's Gala Crack - Legend Award: 2025
- Soccer Hall of Fame: 2026
