= C.F. Monterrey =

Association football club in Mexico

Monterrey
- Full name: Club de Fútbol Monterrey Rayados, A.C.
- Nicknames: Rayados (Striped-Ones); La Pandilla (The Gang); Los Albiazules (The White-and-Blues)
- Short name: MTY, CFM
- Founded: 28 June 1945; 81 years ago
- Stadium: Estadio BBVA
- Capacity: 53,500
- Owner: FEMSA
- President: Dennis te Kloese
- Manager: Matías Almeyda
- League: Liga MX
- Apertura 2026: Regular phase: 6th of 18; Final phase: TBD
- Website: rayados.com
Home colours	Away colours

Club de Fútbol Monterrey Rayados, A.C., also known as Rayados de Monterrey, is a professional football club based in the Monterrey metropolitan area, Nuevo León. The club competes in Liga MX, the highest level of Mexican football, and plays its home matches at Estadio BBVA. Founded in 1945, it is the oldest active professional club from the Northern Mexico, since 1999 the club has been owned by FEMSA. Nicknamed Rayados stems from the club's traditional navy blue striped uniform, which is reflected in the club's crest.

In domestic competitions, CF Monterrey has won five Liga MX titles and three Copa MX titles. In international competitions, the club has won five CONCACAF Champions League titles and one CONCACAF Cup Winners Cup. The club finished as third place twice in the FIFA Club World Cup (2012 and 2019). In 2020, the club became the second Mexican club to complete the treble after winning the Liga MX, Copa MX and CONCACAF Champions League titles.

The club's oldest and biggest rival is Tigres UANL, the rivalry is known as the Clásico Regiomontano, and is considered to be one of the most heated and intensely competed rivalries in Mexican football; both clubs consistently rank among the highest in attendance and regularly feature among the most expensively assembled squads in the country.

== History ==
=== 1940s–50s ===
Team lineup in 1945.

Club de Football Monterrey was founded on 28 June 1945, near the end of World War II by a group of industrial businessmen headed by Ramón Cárdenas Coronado, Enrique Ayala Medina, Paul C. Probert, Rogelio Cantú Gómez and Miguel Margáín Zozaya.

The team's nickname was popularly accepted, after the team's uniform, which is traditionally white with navy blue vertical stripes. Although the original uniform was white with a diagonal blue upper shoulder, the stripes were inspired in 1965, when the Tampico Madero (nicknamed "Jaibas Bravas", or Brave crabs) football team wore them, and the Monterrey team adopted them. Since then, the home uniform consists of vertical blue and white striped jerseys with blue shorts.

In its first professional game, played on 19 August 1945 against San Sebastián de León, Monterrey won 1–0, with José "Che" Gómez scoring the winner. That joy quickly came to an end, first by losing 6–0 to Montezuma, and then having the club's travelling bus involved in a tragic accident in the San Juan de los Lagos roads that would take the lives of many of the club's players and had a big impact on the surviving players. The other Mexican clubs in solidarity loaned players to Monterrey to continue playing the tournament, but the club struggled nevertheless; they lost 21 games in a row and conceded 121 goals that year, finishing last in the league. Due to these events, the club decided to stop playing in the league in 1946 in honor of the players who died.

It was not until 1952 when the club resumed action thanks to Dr. Carlos Canseco, president of the Asociación de Fútbol de Nuevo León. The club enrolled in the second division and just 4 years later the club earned promotion to the top division. Once again the joy was short-lived, when the club finished last in their first year back and was relegated once again to the second division after finishing with a record of 4 wins, 7 draws and 13 losses for a total of 15 points, just 1 short of Zacatepec who earned their permanence in the category. The club would once again earn the promotion in the 1959–60 season, and haven't been relegated since then.

=== 1960s ===
The club started off the 1960s in bad shape, barely avoiding relegation with only 2 more points than Club Celaya, who had 19 points, in the 1960–61 season.

In 1960, C.F. Monterrey got into the first division. 20 March 1960, with a score of 2–0, Monterrey beat the Tigers. The lineup that had won that title was: Agustin "Chiras" Prieto, Humberto Gama, Pablo Thompson, Héctor Uzal, and Jesús "La Chuta" Medina; Eugenio Almirón and Angel Lama; Julián Briseño, Gustavo "Gato" Cuenca, José Antonio Juárez, and Nicolás "Pipo" Téllez. Once, while still in the second division, they also won a championship on 12 June 1960, after defeating Ovideo de Texcoco 1–0, the goal being scored by Agustin "Chiras" Prieto, who was one of the club's top 3 goal scorers during that year.

In the 1963–64 season the club improved their performance and would finish 3rd in the league just 5 points behind champions Guadalajara who had 37 points. In the following two seasons the club would finish third and fourth respectively, narrowly missing out on clinching titles by only a few points. The 1966–67 season was mediocre, as the club finished tied for 8th in the league with Irapuato on 30 points each. This season is also remembered for Jabatos de Nuevo Leon's promotion to the first division, which meant 2 clubs from Monterrey would be participating in the first division However, the following season was even worse, with the club finishing 14th, only four points from relegation.

=== 1970s ===
In 1970 the tournament was split into 2 short tournaments, due to the 1970 World Cup that was taking part in Mexico. In the first stage, the club was placed in group 1 where they managed to finish 2nd with 17 points, one less than group leader Toluca. In the second stage the club finished 7th of eight teams. The following year Monterrey finished runner up to Club América who went on to win the league title that year against Toluca.

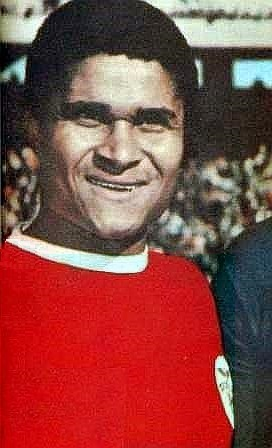
Portuguese football legend Eusébio briefly played for the club in 1975

In the 1971–72 tournament the club qualified for the play-offs which had been introduced a few years back. The club would lose in quarterfinals to Club América 2–1 on aggregate. The following year the club missed out on the playoffs, finishing tied for 5th with Veracruz and Guadalajara each with 32 points. The following season the club managed to qualify for the quarterfinals where they once again were eliminated, this time by Atlético Español 5–6 on aggregate.

Monterrey played its first match in international tournaments on 5 July 1975 in the 1975 CONCACAF Champions' Cup when they defeated Canadian club Serbian White Eagles FC by a score of 2–0.

In the 1975–76 tournament the club finished in first place with a total of 44 points by means of 16 wins, 12 draws and 10 losses. In quarterfinals the club played Cruz Azul and won 7–2 on aggregate. In the semi-finals the club played against Guadalajara who eliminated them, 2–3 on aggregate. During 1975, the Portuguese superstar Eusébio played for the club.

In the 1976–77 and 1977–78 seasons, the club failed to qualify for the playoffs, finishing 4th both times. In the 1978–79 tournament the club once again qualified to the playoffs finishing 1st in group one with a total of 40 points by means of 14 wins 12 draws and 12 losses. This time a short tournament was played by the best 8 teams in the league who were then split into 2 groups. Monterrey was placed in group 2 along with Pumas, Tigres and Zacatepec. After 6 rounds of play the club finished in 3rd place with 6 points, just 2 points behind Pumas who went on to lose against Cruz Azul, the winners of the other group.

In the following season the club finished 3rd in group 1 with 34 points but failed to qualify for the playoffs again. The decade came to an end with "Rayados" having shown great effort, as they qualified a couple times for the playoffs, but failed to win their first league title.

=== 1980s ===
1986 was the first time that Monterrey won the Liga MX title. Due to the 1986 FIFA World Cup, the Mexican league was split in two short tournaments (as they are today): PRODE 86 and México 86. In México 86, the team was commanded by the coach Francisco Avilán and ended at the top spot of the Group 2 and qualified to the Liguilla with Tampico Madero, Cruz Azul and Chivas Guadalajara. In the Liguilla, thrashed 6–0 in aggregate against Atlante in the quarter-finals and eliminated Guadalajara by 2–0 aggregated at semi-finals. In the final, the Rayados won the title defeating Tampico Madero by 3–2 on agregate.

In the year 1989, the anthem of Rayados was created by composer Luis Aguilé. It is considered by Monterrey's fans as one of the symbols of identity of the team.

=== 1990s ===
At the beginning of the decade, Monterrey signed two notable players, Carlos Hermosillo and Manuel Negrete, for the 1990–91 season. The next season, they won their first Copa MX after defeating Juarez 4–2 in the Estadio Tecnológico and then went on to reach the league final of the 1992–93 season, losing to Atlante.

While the early years of the decade seemed promising for Monterrey, the latter half of the decade would prove to be a disappointing one, as financial problems started to become a problem for the club. During this period, the club sold many players who would go on to have successful careers with other teams like Ramón Morales and Sinha. Young talent Jesus Arellano was sold to Guadalajara in 1997, though he returned to the club in 2000 and spent the next eleven years as captain before retiring in 2011.

One of the most memorable moments of this decade was the so-called "Clasico del Descenso" in the 1995–96 season. On 24 March 1996, Monterrey defeated their arch-rivals Tigres 2–1 at Estadio Universitario. Tigres were facing a relegation battle after years of poor results, and needed a victory to avoid being relegated; the defeat meant that Tigres would be relegated for the first and so far only time in their history to the Segunda División.

In 1999, Monterrey was facing a fierce relegation battle of its own against Puebla, culminating on 9 May 1999, when the teams faced each other at the Estadio Tecnológico to decide which team would get relegated. Monterrey only needed a draw to stay in the Primera División, and with a memorable performance from Francisco Javier "El Abuelo" Cruz who had played a vital role in Monterrey's first title win thirteen years before, Monterrey managed to draw 1–1 and stay in Mexico's top flight. Also in 1999, Rayados made his first CONMEBOL Libertadores participation and had a decent campaign despite falling in the group stage.

=== 21st century ===
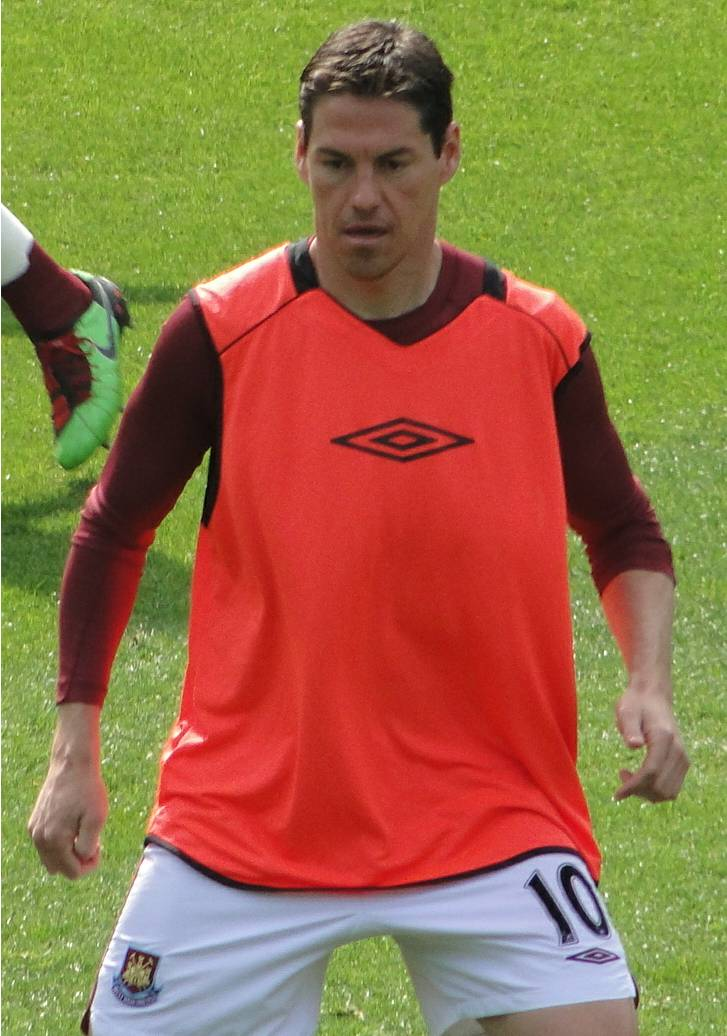
Guillermo Franco (pictured in 2010) played a vital role in the club's Clausura 2003 title win.

Clausura 2003 Championship starting line-up

In 2002, Monterrey hired Argentinian coach Daniel Passarella and started to form a strong and competitive side featuring the likes of Guillermo Franco, Walter Erviti, Jesus Arellano and Luis Perez. In the Clausura 2003 tournament, they won their second official title. In the semi-finals, they faced their arch-rivals Tigres for the first time ever in a Liguilla. In the first leg, they won 4–1 at the Estadio Universitario, and despite losing 2–1 at their home ground in the second leg, they managed to advance to the finals with an aggregate victory of 5–3. On 14 June 2003, they defeated Monarcas Morelia 3–1 on aggregate to claim their second league title after 17 years.

Pasarella left in 2004, and afterwards, Monterrey hired Miguel Herrera to be their head coach. He led them to the finals of the Apertura 2004, but the club lost against Pumas. He would lead them to the finals again in the Apertura 2005 tournament, this time losing to Toluca by an aggregate of 6–3. After the loss, Guillermo Franco left the club to play for Spanish club Villarreal. Herrera would remain their head coach until 2007, when he was fired after a poor string of results in the Apertura 2007. For the Clausura 2008, Monterrey hired Ricardo La Volpe to be their head coach, and they managed to reach the semi-finals. This team featured new players such as Humberto Suazo and newly acquired league veteran striker Jared Borgetti. However, the next tournament was a poor one for Rayados, as they finished in 14th place.

==== The Vucetich Era (2009–13) ====
In 2009, Monterrey hired coach Víctor Manuel Vucetich and formed a team that would become one of the strongest in the league, with an attack led by Humberto Suazo and new acquisition Aldo de Nigris, a midfield featuring veteran players Luis Ernesto Perez and Jesus Arellano along with Walter Ayovi and a defence led by Jose Maria Basanta, Duilio Davino and goalkeeper Jonathan Orozco. They won their third league title, the Apertura 2009 tournament, with an aggregate 6–4 victory against Cruz Azul in the finals. The first leg was played at the Estadio Tecnológico, where Monterrey overcame a 3–1 deficit to win the game 4–3. The second leg was played at the Estadio Azul, with Monterrey winning 2–1. Thus, after a six-year wait Monterrey lifted their third league title.

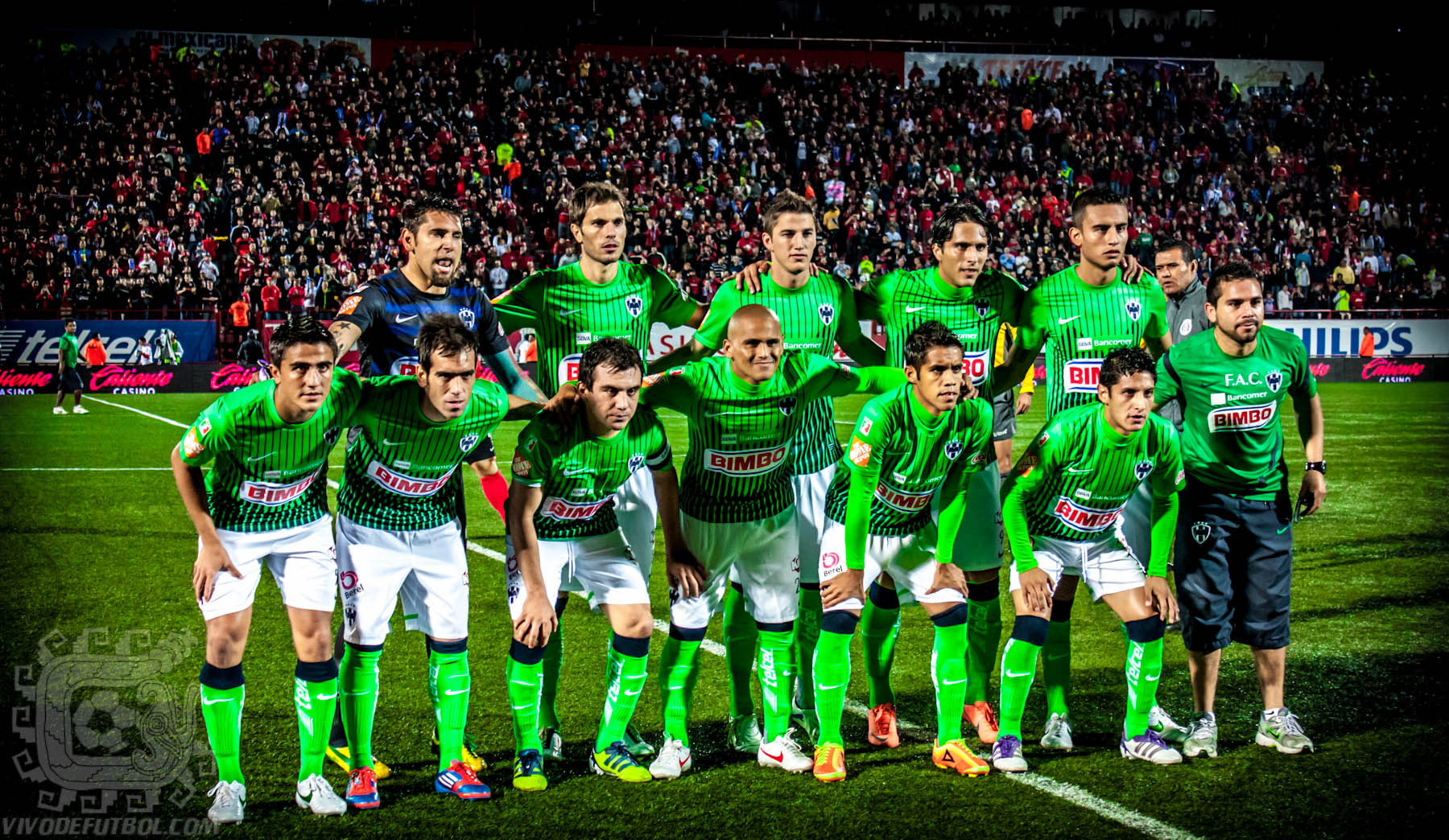
Monterrey in Clausura 2012

Apertura 2009 Championship starting line-up

In the next tournament, Humberto Suazo left to play for Spanish club Real Zaragoza, but nonetheless, Monterrey managed to finish on top of the table for the first time in their history. However, they would be eliminated in the quarter-finals by Pachuca. Suazo returned to Rayados for the Apertura 2010 tournament, and they managed to win their fourth league title when they defeated Santos Laguna in the finals. Although they lost 3–2 in the first leg, they were able to make a comeback and win 3–0 in the second leg at the Estadio Tecnológico, with Humberto Suazo and Jose Basanta scoring two and one goals, respectively. With an aggregate score of 5–3, Monterrey claimed their fourth title.

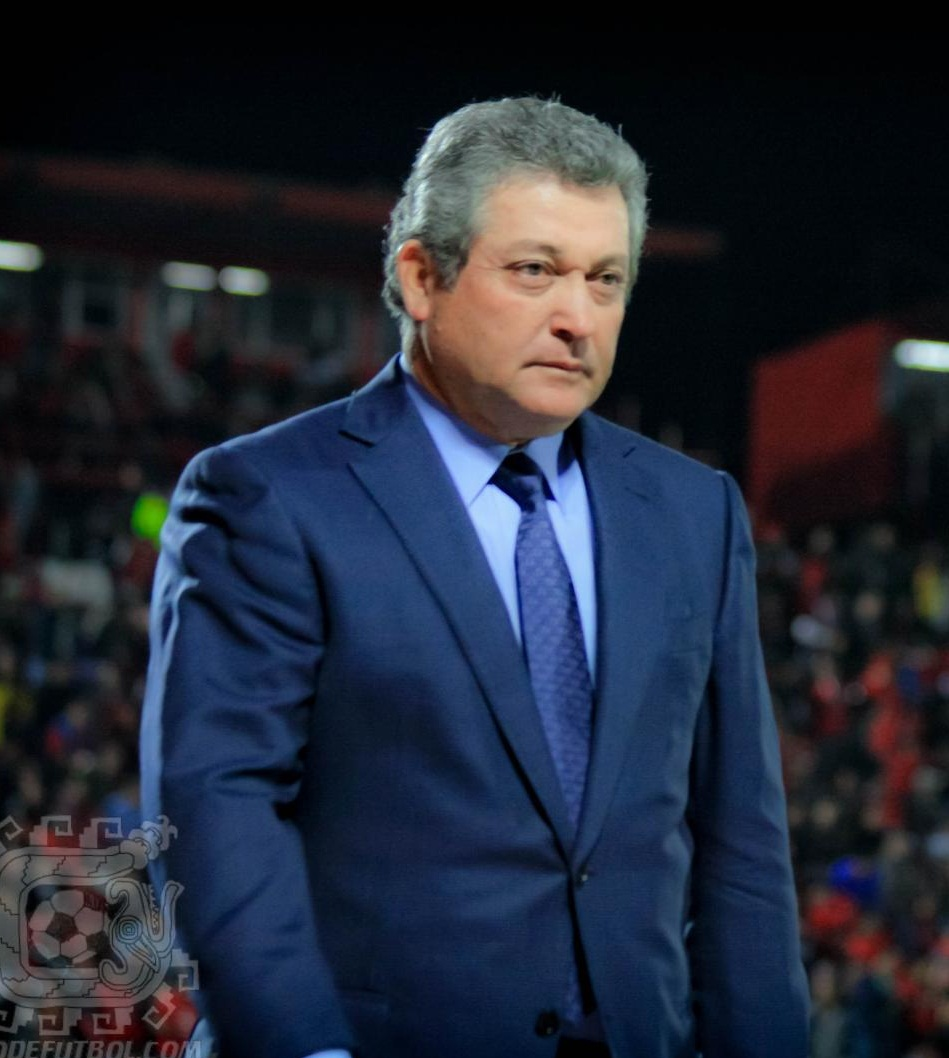
Vucetich in 2012

Monterrey secured a place in the 2010–11 CONCACAF Champions League and won the tournament for the first time in their history. They faced Real Salt Lake in the Finals and won 3–2 on aggregate to claim their first CONCACAF Champions League title and the third title in the Vucetich Era.

Apertura 2010 Championship starting line-up

The following year, they reached the finals of the Clausura 2012 league tournament and the 2011–12 CONCACAF Champions League. Both finals were against the same opponent, Santos Laguna. Rayados were seeking to win their fifth league title and their second Champions League title. They lost the Clausura 2012 finals against Santos, but won the finals of the Champions League against them to claim their second consecutive CONCACAF title.

Monterrey reached the finals of the 2012–13 CONCACAF Champions League for the third consecutive time, and faced Santos Laguna in a repeat of the previous year's final. The first leg finished in a 0–0 draw. In the second leg, Santos built a 2–0 lead with goals from Darwin Quintero and former Rayados player Felipe Baloy. However, Monterrey managed to make a dramatic comeback and scored four goals within 30 minutes, starting with a brace from Aldo de Nigris and a goal each from Humberto Suazo and Neri Cardozo, which gave Monterrey their third consecutive CONCACAF Champions League title and the fifth overall title in the Vucetich Era. This solidified them as the best Mexican football team of all time. Although they enjoyed tremendous success in the CONCACAF Champions League, they did not return to the following tournament as they could not reach any league finals during the 2012–13 Liga MX season and thus could not get a chance to try to become the first team to win the tournament four times in a row.

Monterrey started the 2013–14 season with a lot of changes. Aldo de Nigris left the club to join Chivas, and Walter Ayovi joined Pachuca. By now, players like Jesus Arellano and Duilio Davino had retired, and long-time club players like Luis Ernesto Perez had left the club. With the arrival of new players like Dorlan Pabon and Leobardo Lopez, Monterrey was ready for the Apertura 2013 tournament. However, a string of poor results and the shock early departure of Pabon would prove to be a threat as Monterrey started the tournament poorly. On 25 August 2013, Rayados announced that Vucetich had stepped down as coach, and thus the Vucetich Era, which earned the club a total of five titles in four years, came to an end.

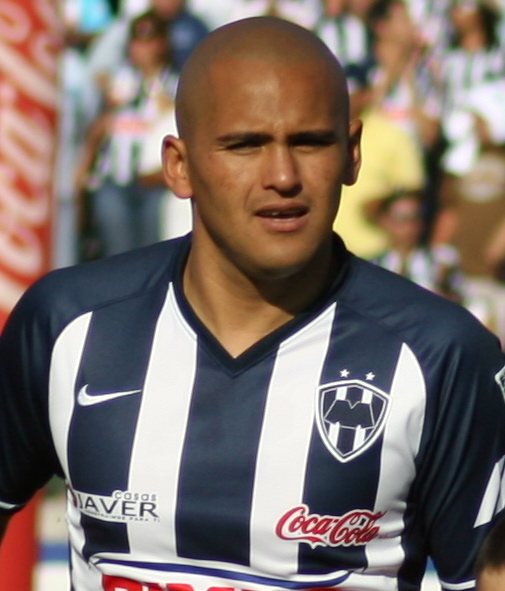
Humberto Suazo is the club's second all-time top scorer with 121 goals across all competitions.

==== Post-Vucetich period (2013–15) ====
Rayados hired José Guadalupe Cruz to become the new manager of the team, and although they managed to reach the semi-finals of the domestic cup, the Copa MX, they failed to qualify to the playoffs of the Apertura 2013 tournament. After a bad start to the Clausura 2014, they fired Cruz on 18 February 2014, after only 17 league games coached.

Monterrey replaced Cruz with Carlos Barra, who had worked as an assistant coach for Vucetich. Although they failed to reach the playoffs for the second consecutive tournament, the team kept Barra for the 2014–15 season. Colombian striker Dorlan Pabon re-joined the team, and with new signings such as Stefan Medina and Pablo Barrera, Monterrey started the Apertura 2014 tournament with high expectations. They managed to secure 6th place and returned to the playoffs for the first time since Vucetich had managed the club. The club had a strike partnership of Dorlan Pabon and Humberto Suazo, with Pabon scoring 11 goals. The club reached the semi-finals but lost 3–0 on aggregate against the eventual champions Club América in what would prove to be Suazo's last games with the club before returning to Colo-Colo. Suazo had scored over 102 league goals in a seven-year span and became the all-time top scorer for the club at the time.

The team started the Clausura 2015 tournament in poor form, losing four of their first six games, and on 15 February, the team fired Barra and replaced him with two-time Liga MX champion Antonio Mohamed, who had led Club América to the league championship the previous tournament. Mohamed had played for Rayados during his years as a player. He was part of the squad that managed to avoid relegation in 1999. Monterrey did not qualify to the playoffs under Mohamed, but the club were keen on keeping him for the 2015–16 season. That season would prove to be a special one as the team were moving to a new home ground, the Estadio BBVA Bancomer. In the summer, Rayados made new signings, including midfielder Walter Gargano, striker Rogelio Funes Mori and re-signed Jose Maria Basanta, who had left for Italian side Florentina after the 2014 FIFA World Cup. Former club veterans Aldo de Nigris and Luis Ernesto Pérez also returned to the club, along with the promotion to the first team of promising young center back Cesar Montes. Rayados had a formidable attacking trio of Dorlan Pabon, Rogelio Funes Mori and Edwin Cardona, who had signed with Monterrey during the winter of 2015. They narrowly missed the playoffs of the Apertura 2015 tournament, but their offense was lauded by many as one of the best in the league.

==== Tenure of Antonio Mohamed (2015–2018) ====
After failing to qualify for the playoffs in 2015, the club loaned several players to other clubs in the league. Players such as Stefan Medina and Severo Meza were loaned to Pachuca and Sinaloa, respectively. In the winter of 2016, the team acquired club veteran Walter Ayovi who had left the club in 2013 and River Plate midfielder Carlos Sánchez who had won the Copa Libertadores a few months prior. The team began the Clausura 2016 tournament in great form by winning their first three games. They went on to have their best regular season in years by finishing on top of the league with 37 points, seven points ahead of second place Pachuca. The team's success was primarily due to their attacking trio composed of Pabon, Funes Mori and Cardona, with midfielder Carlos Sanchez providing several goals and assists.

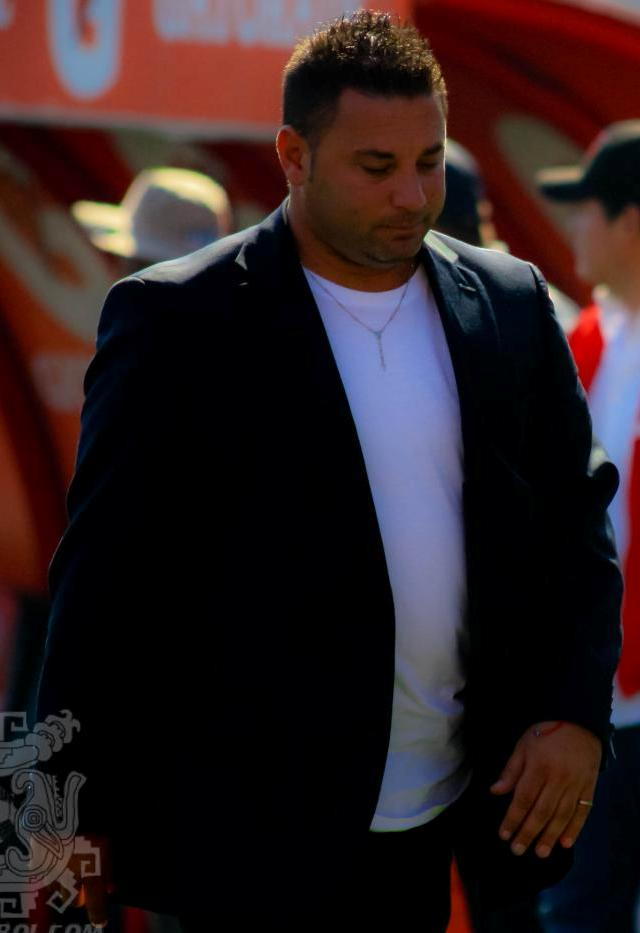
Antonio Mohamed was the club's manager from February 2015 to May 2018

The team entered the playoffs as favourites to win the title. In the quarterfinals, they faced their arch-rivals and defending league champions Tigres UANL, the first leg was played at the Estadio Universitario where Monterrey won 3–1. The away leg was played at the BBVA Bancomer, where Tigres won 2–1 despite several penalties that were controversially awarded to Monterrey. Monterrey advanced to the semi-finals with a 4–3 aggregate victory and extended their record of never being eliminated by Tigres in the playoffs. In the semi-finals, they faced América, losing the first leg at the Estadio Azteca 1–0. In the second leg, they faced them at home and pulled off a dramatic 4–2 victory, in what was described by some pundits as one of the best games in the history of the playoffs. They advanced to the league finals where they would face Pachuca. Controversy arose when it was confirmed that Carlos Sanchez would not be able to play the finals as the Uruguay national team had called him up for the upcoming Copa América Centenario. In the league finals against Pachuca, Monterrey lost the first leg 1–0 at the Estadio Hidalgo, with the sole goal coming from striker Franco Jara. The second leg took place at the Estadio BBVA Bancomer in what was its first ever final since it was inaugurated the year before. On 29 May, in front of 53,000 spectators, the final was played. Monterrey opened the scoring in the 39th minute with a shot from Dorlan Pabon to level the aggregate 1–1. Veteran goalkeeper Óscar Pérez had several key saves for Pachuca, and in the closing minutes of the game, a header from Victor Guzman in the 93rd minute gave the title to Pachuca in what was described by the Mexican media as a heart-breaking defeat for Monterrey.

The following tournament ended in disappointment as the team narrowly failed to qualify to the playoffs of the Apertura 2016. However, it also saw the return of Rayados to the CONCACAF Champions League after a three-year absence, having won the tournament three times in a row under Vucetich. The team had high hopes to redeem itself after their league title loss; however, the team was shockingly eliminated in the group stage after finishing second in their group behind Panamanian club Arabe Unido.

In the Apertura 2017 season, Monterrey finished the regular season in first place with 37 points and advanced to playoffs. In quarterfinals, Monterrey beat Atlas 2–1 in the first leg and 4–1 in the second, a 6–2 aggregate. Monterrey faced Morelia in semi-finals, winning 1–0 in the away leg and 4–0 in the home leg, a 5–0 aggregate. Monterrey advanced to the final against arch rival Tigres, In the first leg, the teams tied 1–1 at the Estadio Universitario. In the second leg at the Estadio BBVA Bancomer, Tigres beat Monterrey 2–1 with goals from Eduardo Vargas and Francisco Meza. In May 2018, Mohamed resigned from his position shortly after being eliminated from the Clausura 2018 playoffs by Club Tijuana. He left the club having won two titles and breaking the club record amount of points for short seasons, but was criticized for various playoff failures.

==== Appointment of Diego Alonso (2018–2019) ====

Apertura 2019 Championship starting line-up

After announcing the appointment of Diego Alonso in July 2018, the club would have a great run in the Copa MX. Despite beating Querétaro 1–0 in the quarter-finals and Pachuca on penalties in the semi-finals, the club would fall short, losing 2–0 to Cruz Azul in Copa MX Apertura final. Monterrey would finish third in the Liga MX Clausura and fifth in the Liga MX Apertura, giving them a playoff spot in both competitions. They would advance to the semi-finals in the Clausura playoffs, beating Necaxa but losing to Tigres on a league position decider after a 1–1 draw. In the Apertura playoffs they would have to face the same faith, going on to the semi-finals of the competition, beating Santos Laguna 3–0 on aggregate in the quarter-finals until facing Cruz Azul and falling short on a league position decider after a 1–1 draw. In the CONCACAF Champions League, they would go on to win the continental tournament after convincingly beating Sporting Kansas City 10–2 on aggregate in the semi-final and finally beating rivals Tigres in the CONCACAF Champions League final. This fourth CONCACAF championship was significant to the city and seen as a kind of revenge for the domestic final lost to Tigres, and is known in the city as "the star that shines the most".

In the Apertura 2019 season, Diego Alonso would be dismissed from his post having more defeats than victories in the Apertura.

==== Reappointment of Antonio Mohamed (2019–2020) ====
On 14 October, Antonio Mohamed was reappointed as the manager of Monterrey. The club would find themselves in a good run in the Club World Cup, advancing to the semi-finals after beating Al Sadd 3–2, but were eventually eliminated by losing to Liverpool after a stoppage time winner from Roberto Firmino. The club would beat Al Hilal on penalties, earning a third place medal in the 2019 FIFA Club World Cup. That same month, despite the club finishing 8th on the Apertura general table, they would go on to reach the championship finals against América and defeat them in penalties, winning 4–2 and securing their 5th championship league trophy.

==== A new decade (2020–present) ====
Monterrey entered a new decade under mounting pressure from the success of their local rivals. In the Clausura 2020, the club endured a ten-match winless streak before the tournament was abandoned due to the COVID-19 pandemic. The following campaign saw Monterrey miss the playoffs, prompting Antonio Mohamed to step down from his role. Javier Aguirre took the reins ahead of the Clausura 2021, guiding the team to its fifth CONCACAF Champions Cup title, Monterrey defeated Club América 1–0 in the final on 29 October 2021, with the decisive goal scored by Rogelio Funes Mori in the 8th minute. For a while, Monterrey was the "triplete" holder, having won Liga MX, CONCACHAMPIONS and Copa MX. In the modern apertura and clausura era, no other team had done this before or after. However, a string of poor results cost "el Vasco" his job midway through the Clausura 2022. Víctor Manuel Vucetich stepped in as his replacement, marking his return for a second stint at the helm.

In October 2022, José Antonio Noriega was appointed sporting director and oversaw an ambitious recruitment strategy focused on marquee signings. High-profile arrivals included Sergio Canales, Jesús Corona, Sergio Ramos, Óliver Torres, and Anthony Martial. Despite assembling a star-studded squad, Monterrey struggled to meet expectations, reaching just one final—the Apertura 2024—where, under Martín Demichelis, they finished as runners-up after a narrow defeat to Club América. At the 2025 FIFA Club World Cup, Monterrey, now managed by Domènec Torrent, faced Inter Milan, River Plate, and Urawa Red Diamonds. They advanced to the round of 16 after finishing second in their group, where they were eliminated by Borussia Dortmund. Noriega left his post at the end of the Clausura 2026, after Rayados failed to reach the playoffs.

== Culture ==
=== Colours ===
Since the club's founding in 1945, the colours used by the club have been white and blue, with varied use from the usual stripes. The shade of the blue itself has been in constant change, ranging from navy and cobalt to slightly lighter tones. The third colour has also been inconsistent, sometimes presented as being red, orange and cyan, and recently, violet, purple or green.

=== Youth development ===
The club has constantly emphasized home-grown (cantera) players and has produced international players such as Francisco Javier Cruz, Héctor Becerra, Missael Espinoza, Jesús Arellano, Antonio de Nigris, Severo Meza, Jonathan Orozco, Jesús Zavala, Hiram Mier, Jesús Manuel Corona, César Montes, Jonathan González, and Carlos Rodríguez among others.

=== Rivalry ===
Rayados' biggest rival is Tigres UANL. This rivalry is called the Clásico Regiomontano. Monterrey and Tigres are both known to sell out all of their home games regardless of weather conditions and the teams' status. For Clásico matches, the stadium is sold out as soon as tickets go on sale. The rivalry has been labeled as the most intensely competed rivalry in Mexican football.

As of August 2022, there have been a total of 128 official Clásico games, Tigres has been victorious in 47 of them, while Monterrey has won 42, and a total of 39 games have been draws. Monterrey and Tigres played their first Clásico on 13 July 1974 in the Estadio Universitario, with the match ending in a 1–1 draw. Monterrey would be the first team to win the Clásico in their second confrontation, 2–1. Almost all their first encounters were played in the Estadio Universitario, with averages of 70,000 fans attending these games, which were before the stadium renovation. In addition, there were also another six "non-official" games before the first official Clásico, in five of which Rayados were victorious.

Monterrey has recently held somewhat of a regional rivalry with state neighbors Santos Laguna, whom they have played a total of four finals, with Monterrey winning three of them and Santos one. It is known by many as La Nortena.

=== Fan base ===
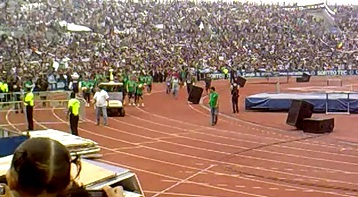
25,000 in attendance at a Monterrey training session.

Los Rayados supporters constantly fill the Estadio BBVA Bancomer. They had the highest average Liga MX attendance (50,000 per game) in 2016. The city of Monterrey claims and does have Mexico's most loyal supporting crowds for their teams, due to the city having the only venues that regularly sell-out in the Primera División. There is a rivalry between the La Adicción, a C.F. Monterrey support crowd, and the Libres y Lokos, a Tigres UANL support crowd, each time a Clásico takes place.

=== Children's web series ===
In 2017, the club launched its YouTube and YouTube Kids original series, Rayados Kids, dedicated to creating content for children who love the team, in interview style format with the team players and original stories revolving around the teams actual positioning on football leagues. The web garnered around six thousand subscriptions and one million views in its first year.

=== Rayados Christmas Campaign ===
Since 2010 Rayados teammates have joined to wish a Merry Christmas to its fans, by filming their annual holiday campaign. It has become a tradition to include a new rendition of their famous crowd chant song "El Corrido de Monterrey" each year on their holiday video, showing their fans how their passion lives "En la Vida y en la Cancha" (In Life and on the Field).

== Grounds ==
Monterrey played their home matches at the Estadio Tecnológico from 1950 to 2015, though for a period of time from 1973 to 1980 they played at the Estadio Universitario, the stadium was opened on 17 July 1950, by Mexican president Miguel Alemán Valdés, it was the second oldest football stadium in Mexico, after Estadio Azul. The stadium was a part of the 1986 Mexico FIFA World Cup which could hold 38,000 people, and served 4 matches within the tournament but, in July 2017 the stadium began to be demolished.

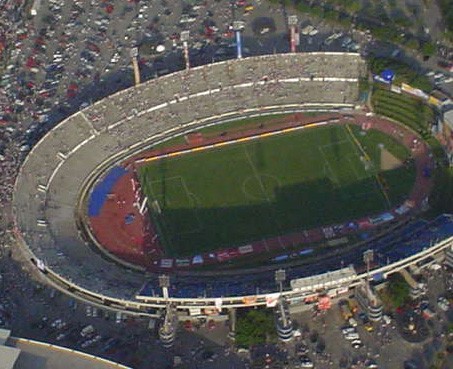
Monterrey played at the Estadio Tecnológico from 1950 to 2015

In 1977–78, with preparations for the 1977 CONCACAF Championship underway at the Estadio Universitario, both Tigres and Rayados played at the Estadio Tecnológico, including the first Clásico Regio derby held in the stadium; it would be the first of 42 meetings between the two clubs venue, with the final fixture being a 2–2 draw in October 2014.

Monterrey won league titles in 1986 (Mexico 1986) and Apertura 2010 in the venue, as well as the Copa MX in 1991 and the CONCACAF Champions League in 2012–13.

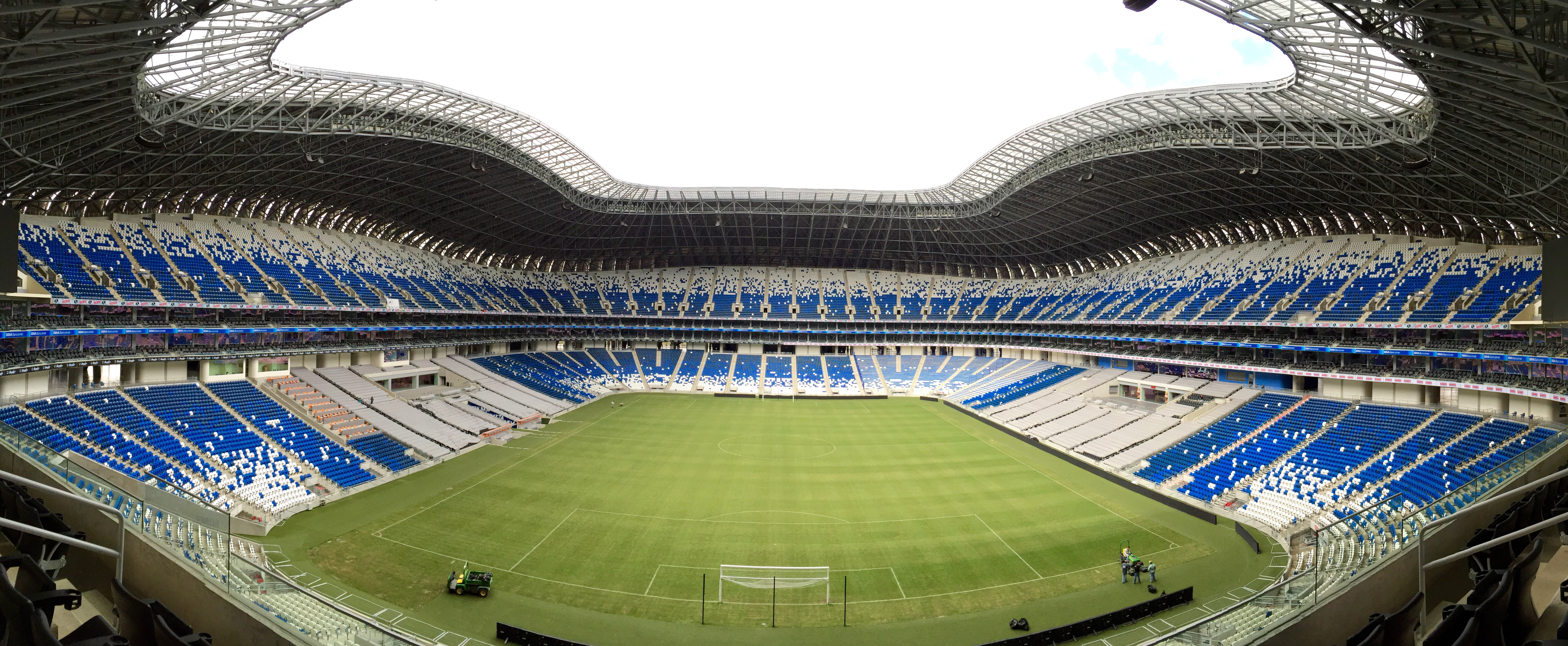
The interior of Estadio BBVA

In July 2015, Monterrey moved to a new stadium called Estadio BBVA, located in Guadalupe, Nuevo León, in Greater Monterrey. The new stadium currently has a capacity of 53,500 people. The stadium has similar features of those incorporated within the design of England's Wembley Stadium and the Aviva Stadium in Ireland. The stadium was inaugurated on 2 August 2015 in a friendly match for the eighth edition of the Eusébio Cup, where Monterrey defeated Benfica 3–0 hosting in front of a sold-out crowd.

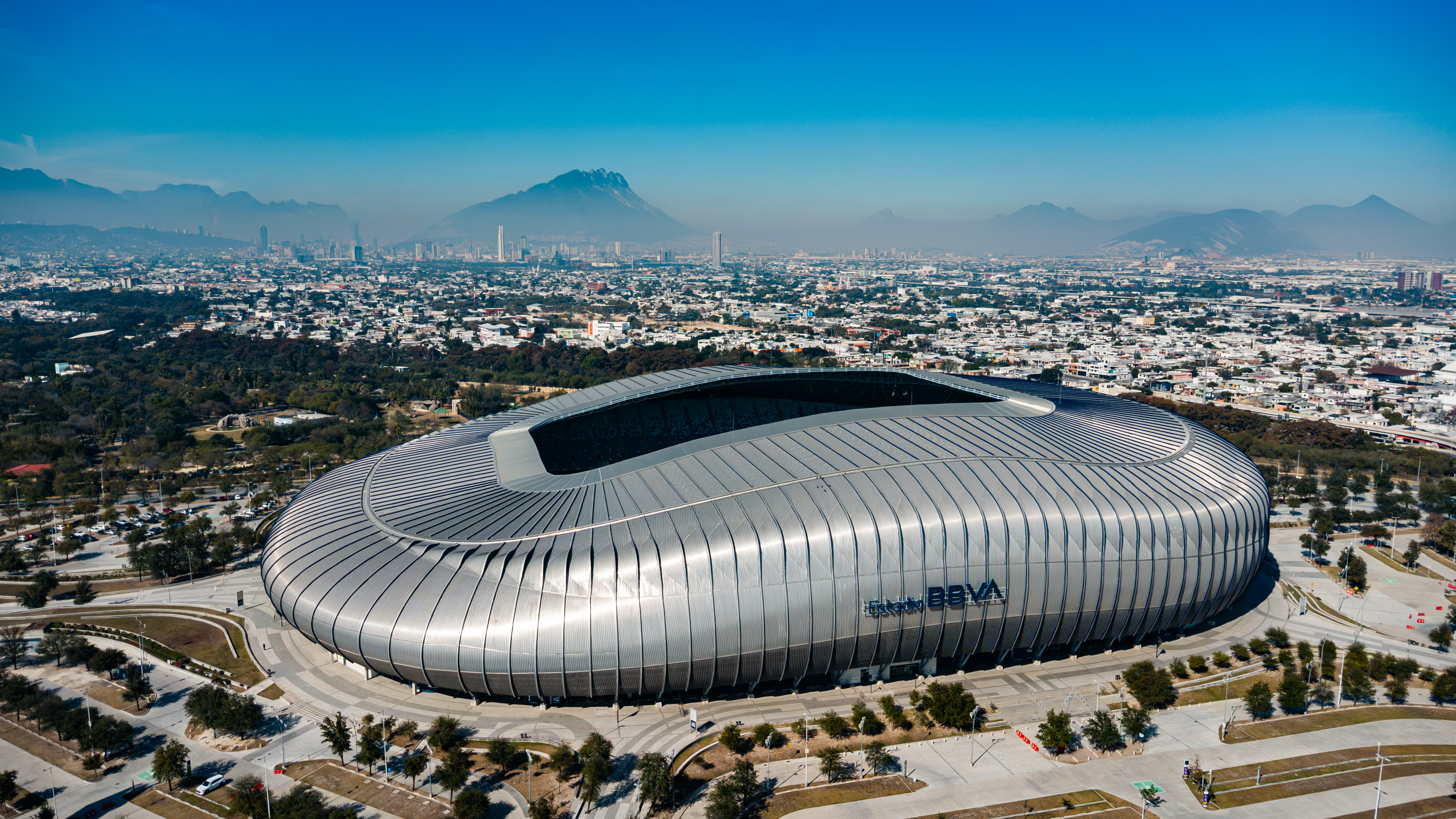
Estadio BBVA has been Monterrey's current home since Apertura 2015

Estadio BBVA, designed by Christopher Lee of Populous, started its development in October 2011, and included plans for reforestation and environmental healing for the decaying area that surrounds the construction site. The stadium was developed by FEMSA which costed around US$200 million. It is seen as one of the most beautiful stadiums in Mexico, it has the fourth largest capacity crowd in Mexico. It has an authentic grass surface, suites, a club-themed Restaurant, a club lounge, and high-end interior and exterior design. The inclination of the grandstand is 34 degrees and with the minimum distance allowed by FIFA to provide unsurpassed closeness to the action.

On 29 May 2016, Monterrey played their first final in their new stadium in front of 50,000 fans against Pachuca for the Clausura 2016 championship, which they tied 1–1, but lost 2–1 on aggregate.

== Kits and sponsorship ==
=== Kit evolution ===
The original uniform was a shirt that was split diagonally across the chest with blue and white at each side, with white shorts and navy blue socks. In 1955 after winning the second division the club used a white shirt with two horizontal blue lines across the chest. In the 1960s the club wore a different kit inspired by the one used by Jaibos Tampico Madero with vertical baby blue lines with white shorts and socks. It was in 1962 when D. José Ramón Ballina introduced the kit that the club still uses to date, inspired by Asturias FC, a club he had played in Mexico City.

In the 1970s, many models emerged, some with broad, thicker stripes, and blue and black combinations, but the most significant change occurred in the mid-1980s when the color of the T-shirt changed from royal blue to navy blue, a colour that is still in use today.

Atletica was the kit manufacturer from 1999 to 2007, followed by American company Nike which manufactured the kits from 2007 to 2014. Afterwards, Monterrey signed a contract with German sportswear manufacturer Puma which has been making the team's kit ever since.

== Honours ==
Domestic
Type	Competition	Titles	Seasons	Runners-up
Top level FMF	Liga MX	5	Mex–1986, Cla–2003, Ape–2009, Ape–2010, Ape–2019	1992–93, Ape–2004, Ape–2005, Cla–2012, Cla–2016, Ape–2017, Ape–2024
Top level FMF	Copa MX	3	1991–92, Ape–2017, 2019–20	1963–64, 1968–69, Ape–2018
Top level FMF	Campeón de Campeones	0	—	2003
Top level FMF	Supercopa MX	0	—	2018
Lower levels FMF	Segunda División	2	1955–56, 1959–60	1957–58, 1958–59
Lower levels FMF	Copa México Segunda División	0	—	1957–58
Lower levels FMF	Campeón de Campeones Segunda División	1	1960	1956
International
Type	Competition	Titles	Seasons	Runners-up
Continental CONCACAF	CONCACAF Champions Cup	5	2010–11, 2011–12, 2012–13, 2019, 2021	—
Continental CONCACAF	CONCACAF Cup Winners Cup	1^{s}	1993	—
Regional North America CONCACAF USSF–FMF	Leagues Cup	0	—	2026

Notes

- record
- ^{s} shared record

== Personnel ==
=== Management ===
Position	Staff
Sporting chairman	(Netherlands) Dennis te Kloese
Corporate chairman	(Mexico) Manuel Filizola
Director of football	(Argentina) Walter Erviti
Director of academy	(Argentina) Nicolás Martellotto

Source: Liga MX

=== Coaching staff ===
Position	Staff
Manager	(Argentina) Matías Almeyda
Assistant manager	(Argentina) Daniel Vega
Assistant manager	(Argentina) Agustín Zalazar
Goalkeeper coach	(Argentina) Fabián Donelli
Fitness coach	(Argentina) Guido Bonini
Physiotherapist	(Spain) Emilio Ricart
Team doctors	(Mexico) Francisco García
Team doctors	(Mexico) Felipe Peña
Assistant doctors	(Argentina) Sebastián Giavino
Assistant doctors	(Argentina) Gustavo Zingaretti

Source: Liga MX

== Players ==
=== First-team squad ===
As of 23 July 2026

Note: Flags indicate national team as defined under FIFA eligibility rules; some limited exceptions apply. Players may hold more than one non-FIFA nationality.

No.	Pos.	Nation	Player
1	GK	ARG	Esteban Andrada
2	DF	MEX	Ricardo Chávez
3	DF	MEX	Gerardo Arteaga
4	DF	MEX	Víctor Guzmán
5	MF	MEX	Fidel Ambríz
7	MF	ARG	Lucas Ocampos
8	MF	ESP	Óliver Torres
9	FW	URU	Diego Rossi
10	MF	ARG	Luca Orellano
11	MF	MEX	Iker Fimbres
13	DF	MEX	Carlos Salcedo
14	DF	MEX	Érick Aguirre
17	MF	MEX	Jesús Manuel Corona
18	MF	MEX	César Garza

No.	Pos.	Nation	Player
19	DF	MEX	Alonso Aceves
21	DF	MEX	Luis Reyes
22	GK	MEX	Luis Cárdenas
25	MF	MEX	Orbelín Pineda
27	FW	MEX	Roberto de la Rosa
30	MF	ARG	Jorge Rodríguez
31	GK	MEX	César Ramos
32	FW	MNE	Uroš Đurđević
33	DF	COL	Stefan Medina
34	DF	MEX	César Bustos
35	MF	MEX	Sebastián Rodríguez (on loan from Houston Dynamo)
36	MF	MEX	Javier Casillas
99	FW	BEL	Hugo Cuypers

=== Youth squad ===
Note: Flags indicate national team as defined under FIFA eligibility rules; some limited exceptions apply. Players may hold more than one non-FIFA nationality.

No.	Pos.	Nation	Player
185	MF	MEX	Allen Rojas
194	MF	MEX	Cristian Reyes
200	MF	MEX	Omar Gálvez

No.	Pos.	Nation	Player
203	FW	MEX	Aldo de Nigris
206	FW	MEX	Aldahir Valenzuela
244	MF	USA	Paxon Ruffin

=== Out on loan ===
Note: Flags indicate national team as defined under FIFA eligibility rules; some limited exceptions apply. Players may hold more than one non-FIFA nationality.

No.	Pos.	Nation	Player
—	GK	URU	Santiago Mele (at Independiente)
—	DF	MEX	Tony Leone (at UNAM)
—	DF	MEX	Mauricio Morales (at Santiago)
—	DF	CHI	Sebastián Vegas (at León)
—	MF	MEX	Jesús Rodríguez (at Santiago)

No.	Pos.	Nation	Player
—	MF	COL	Johan Rojas (at Vasco da Gama)
—	MF	MEX	Pablo Sánchez (at Santiago)
—	FW	MEX	Eduardo Escalante (at Jaiba Brava)
—	FW	MEX	Josué Morales (at Santiago)
—	FW	MEX	Joaquín Moxica (at Atlante)

=== Top scorers ===
**Club de Fútbol Monterrey**
Rank	Player	FMF	CUP	CON	REC	CWC	INL	TOTAL
1	(Mexico) Rogelio Funes Mori	133	19	5	0	3	0	160
2	(Chile) Humberto Suazo	102	0	16	0	2	1	121
3	(Brazil) Mario de Souza	90	5	1	0	0	0	96
4	(Colombia) Dorlan Pabón	73	12	3	0	0	0	88
5	(Mexico) Aldo de Nigris	66	0	15	0	2	0	83
6	(Brazil) Milton Carlos	73	0	0	0	0	0	73
7	(Uruguay) Rubén Romeo Corbo	68	0	1	0	0	0	69
8	(Mexico) Guillermo Franco	63	0	2	0	0	0	65
9	(Mexico) Alfredo Jiménez	58	0	1	0	0	0	59
10	(Mexico) Francisco Javier Cruz	54	0	3	0	0	0	57
11	(Mexico) Lucho Pérez	49	0	3	0	0	3	55
–	(Brazil) Bira	55	0	0	0	0	0	55
13	(Argentina) Sergio Verdirame	46	0	0	4	0	0	50
14	(Mexico) Jesús Arellano	48	0	0	0	0	1	49
15	(Argentina) Nicolás Sánchez	31	6	5	0	0	0	42

Legend:
FMF: Liga MX
CUP: Copa MX
CON: CONCACAF Champions League
REC: Recopa de la Concacaf
CWC: FIFA Club World Cup
INL: InterLiga

=== Most appearances ===
**Club de Fútbol Monterrey**
Rank	Player	Period	Apps
1	(Mexico) Magdaleno Cano	1967–1982	437
2	(Mexico) Jesús Arellano	1994–1997; 2000–2011	407
3	(Argentina) José María Basanta	2008–2014; 2016–2020	390
4	(Mexico) Lucho Pérez	2003–2012; 2015–2016	388
5	(Mexico) Jonathan Orozco	2005–2016	371
6	(Colombia) **Stefan Medina**	2014; 2016–present	350
7	(Mexico) Rogelio Funes Mori	2015–2023	328
8	(Mexico) Jesús Eduardo Zavala	2006–2018	285

- Players in **bold** are currently active with Club de Fútbol Monterrey.
- Does not count appearances in international competitions.

== Managers ==
- (Uruguay) Roberto Scarone (1962–65)
- (Mexico) Mario Perez (1966–69)
- (Mexico) Ignacio "El Gallo" Jáuregui (1969–74)
- (Chile) Fernando Riera (1975–76)
- (Brazil) Bira (1976)
- (Brazil) Luis Firpo (1976–77)
- (Chile) Fernando Riera (1977–78)
- (Brazil) Otto Glória (1978–79)
- (Mexico) Gustavo Peña (1979)
- (Brazil) Bira (1979–80)
- (Argentina) Pedro Dellacha (1980–81)
- (Uruguay) Héctor Hugo Eugui (1981–82)
- (Mexico) Vicente Pereda (1982–83)
- (Uruguay) Roberto Matosas (1983–84)
- (Mexico) Francisco Avilán (1984–87)
- (Mexico) José Ledezma (1987–89)
- (Chile) Fernando Riera (1989)
- (Chile) Pedro García (1989–91)
- (Brazil) Carlos Alberto Torres (1991–92)
- (Mexico) Miguel Mejía Barón (1 July 1991 – 30 June 93)
- (Mexico) Hugo Hernández (1993–94)
- (Mexico) Magdaleno Cano (1994), (1997), (1999)
- (Chile) Arturo Salah (1 July 1994 – 30 June 97)
- (Peru) Claudio Lostanau (1997)
- (Mexico) Tomás Boy (1 July 1997 – 30 June 98)
- (Mexico) José Treviño (22 Jan 1999 – 1 March 99)
- (Paraguay) Carlos Jara Saguier (4 March 1999 – 30 June 99)
- (Argentina) Eduardo Solari (1999)
- (Spain) Benito Floro (12 Nov 1999 – 30 June 2001)
- (Argentina) Daniel Passarella (1 July 2002 – 31 December 2003)
- (Uruguay) Hugo de León (2004)
- (Mexico) Sergio Orduña (20 April 2004 – 30 June 2004)
- (Mexico) Miguel Herrera (1 July 2004–16 Sep 2007)
- (Mexico) Isaac Mizrahi Smeke (1 Oct 2007 – 10 January 2008)
- (Argentina) Ricardo La Volpe (12 Jan 2008 – 8 January 2009)
- (Mexico) Víctor Manuel Vucetich (9 Jan 2009 – 26 August 2013)
- (Mexico) José Guadalupe Cruz (27 Aug 2013 – 18 February 2014)
- (Mexico) C. Barra & J. Treviño (interim) (19 Feb 2014 – 16 May 2014)
- (Mexico) Carlos Barra (16 May 2014 – 15 February 2015)
- (Argentina) Antonio Mohamed (16 February 2015 – 7 May 2018)
- (Uruguay) Diego Alonso (18 May 2018 – 30 September 2019)
- (Argentina) Antonio Mohamed (9 October 2019 – 25 November 2020)
- (Mexico) Javier Aguirre (7 December 2020 – 26 February 2022)
- (Mexico) Víctor Manuel Vucetich (2 March 2022 – 28 May 2023)
- (Argentina) Fernando Ortíz (29 May 2023 – 6 August 2024)
- (Argentina) Martín Demichelis (12 August 2024 – 11 May 2025)
- (Spain) Domènec Torrent (21 May 2025 – 1 March 2026)
- (Argentina) Matías Almeyda (21 May 2026 - Present)

== Reserves ==
- Monterrey FAAC: The team participated in the Segunda División and Tercera División, between 1990 and 1995.
- Monterrey A: The team participated in the Primera División A, from 2004 to 2009.
- Monterrey TDP/Monterrey B: The team participated in the Reserves tournament (Tercera División), from 2009 to 2019.
- C.F. Monterrey Premier: The team participated in the Reserves tournament (Liga Premier), from 2015 to 2018.
- Raya2 Expansión: The team participated in the Liga de Expansión MX, from 2021 to 2023.
