= Bahía (footballer, born 1958) =

Brazilian footballer

Personal information
- Full name: Mario de Souza Mota
- Date of birth: August 8, 1958 (age 68)
- Place of birth: São Paulo, Brazil
- Position: Striker

Senior career*
Years	Team	Apps	(Gls)
1984 – 1992	Monterrey	213	(90)
- * Club domestic league appearances and goals as of 28 October 2012 ‡ National team caps and goals as of 28 October 2012

Mario de Souza Mota (born August 8, 1958 in São Paulo, Brazil), known as Bahía, is a Brazilian former footballer who played as a striker with Monterrey in Mexico from 1984 to 1992. He was part of the team that won the 1986 championship. Until 2012 he was the club's all-time top scorer with 96 goals in all competitions.
