= 2010 InterLiga Final =

After both finals have been played, both winners qualify to the Copa Libertadores. Of the two winners, the team with the highest points during the group stages will be dubbed "Mexico 2"

== Final 1 ==
Kickoffs are given in (UTC-6).

2010-01-13
20:00

Puebla (Mexico)	2 – 3	(Mexico) Estudiantes Tecos
Acosta 4'; Olivera 47'	(Report)	Ruíz 51', 80'; Sambueza 89'

Home Depot Center, Carson, California
Attendance: 27,000
Referee: Baldomero Toledo (United States)

Puebla	Estudiantes Tecos

PUEBLA:
GK	1	(Mexico) Jorge Villalpando
RB	2	(Mexico) Orlando Rincón (yellow card) 57'
CB	5	(Mexico) Álvaro Ortiz
SW	23	(Mexico) Joaquín Velázquez
CB	3	(Uruguay) Alejandro Acosta
LB	11	(Mexico) Gilberto Mora (yellow card) 76' (substituted off) 88'
DM	14	(Mexico) Luis Miguel Noriega (c)
DM	6	(Uruguay) Marcelo Palau
LW	10	(Uruguay) Nicolás Olivera
RW	20	(Guatemala) Carlos Ruíz
FW	13	(Uruguay) Álvaro González (substituted off) 65'
Substitutes:
GK	33	(Mexico) Alexandro Álvarez
DF	26	(Mexico) Roberto Juárez
MF	7	(Mexico) Sergio Rosas
MF	29	(Mexico) Rodrigo Salinas (substituted on) 88'
MF	30	(Mexico) Felipe Ayala
MF	22	(Mexico) Pablo Aja
FW	9	(United States) Hérculez Gómez (substituted on) 65'
Manager:
(Mexico) José Luis Sánchez Solá

ESTUDIANTES TECOS:
GK	23	(Mexico) Mario Rodríguez
RB	6	(Mexico) Rafael Medina (substituted off) 53'
CB	2	(Mexico) Oswaldo Alanís
SW	27	(Mexico) Juan Carlos Leaño (c) (yellow card) 72'
CB	21	(Mexico) Diego Jiménez
LB	7	(Mexico) Daniel Alcántar
DM	18	(Argentina) Jorge Zamogilny (yellow card) 32'
DM	20	(Mexico) Elgabry Rangel
RW	11	(Chile) Rodrigo Ruíz (substituted off) 89'
LW	14	(Argentina) Rubens Sambueza (yellow card) 55'
FW	16	(Paraguay) Fredy Bareiro (yellow card) 68' (substituted off) 77'
Substitutes:
GK	1	(Mexico) Fabián Villaseñor
DF	8	(Mexico) Joel Sánchez (substituted on) 89'
DF	25	(Mexico) José Ramón Partida
DF	58	(Mexico) Emerson Lomelí
MF	5	(Mexico) Alberto Ramírez (substituted on) 77'
MF	10	(Argentina) Mauro Cejas (substituted on) 53'
FW	9	(Chile) Roberto Gutiérrez
Manager:
(Mexico) Miguel Herrera

Assistant referees:
(United States) Fabio Tovar
(Canada) Héctor Vergara
Fourth official:
(United States) Kevin Stott

== Final 2 ==
Kickoffs are given in (UTC-6).

2010-01-13
22:30

América (Mexico)	0 – 0 (a.e.t.)	(Mexico) Monterrey
	(Report)
Penalties
Cabañas (penalty missed); Rojas (penalty scored); Mosquera (penalty missed); Pardo (penalty missed)	1 – 3	(penalty scored) Pérez; (penalty scored) Ayoví; (penalty scored) Martínez

Home Depot Center, Carson, California
Referee: Ricardo Salazar (United States)

América	Monterrey

AMÉRICA:
GK	1	(Mexico) Guillermo Ochoa
RB	4	(Mexico) Óscar Rojas
CB	6	(Mexico) Juan Carlos Valenzuela
CB	3	(Colombia) Aquivaldo Mosquera
LB	15	(Mexico) Guillermo Cerda (substituted off) 88'
RW	21	(Mexico) Enrique Esqueda (substituted off) 66'
DM	5	(Brazil) Rosinei (yellow card) 87'
DM	13	(Mexico) Pável Pardo (c)
LW	29	(Chile) Jean Beausejour
SS	11	(Argentina) Daniel Montenegro
CF	10	(Paraguay) Salvador Cabañas
Substitutes:
GK	36	(Mexico) Alfonso Blanco
DM	14	(Mexico) Jesús Sánchez
MF	18	(Mexico) Ángel Reyna (yellow card) 72' (substituted on) 66'
MF	23	(Mexico) Joaquín Martínez
MF	26	(Mexico) Juan Carlos Silva
MF	7	(Mexico) Alonso Sandoval (substituted on) 88'
FW	24	(Mexico) Daniel Márquez
Manager:
(Mexico) Jesús Ramírez

MONTERREY:
GK	1	(Mexico) Jonathan Orozco
RB	2	(Mexico) Severo Meza (substituted off) 70'
CB	19	(Mexico) Héctor Morales
CB	15	(Argentina) José Basanta
LB	22	(Mexico) William Paredes
DM	6	(Mexico) Gerardo Galindo (substituted off) 79'
CM	8	(Mexico) Luis Ernesto Pérez (c)
LW	20	(Ecuador) Walter Ayoví
RW	18	(Argentina) Neri Cardozo (yellow card) 2'
SS	10	(Paraguay) Osvaldo Martínez
CF	13	(Mexico) Abraham Carreño (substituted off) 54'
Substitutes:
GK	25	(Mexico) Omar Ortíz
DF	5	(Mexico) Duilio Davino
MF	21	(Mexico) Sergio Pérez (substituted on) 70'
MF	7	(Mexico) Juan Carlos Medina
MF	28	(Mexico) Jesús Arellano
FW	9	(Mexico) Sergio Santana (substituted on) 79'
FW	11	(Mexico) Aldo de Nigris (substituted on) 54'
Manager:
(Mexico) Víctor Manuel Vucetich

Assistant referees:
(United States) Corey Rockwell
(Belgium) Frank de Bleeckere
Fourth official:
(United States) Ramón Hernández
