= 2011–12 Estudiantes Tecos season =

Estudiantes Tecos
2011–12 season
- Chairman: José Antonio Leaño
- Manager: José Luis Sánchez Solá (Nov. 2010–Aug. 2011); Raul Arias (Aug. 2011–Nov. 2011); José Luis Salgado (Nov. 2011–Jan. 2012); Héctor Hugo Eugui (from Jan. 2012)
- Stadium: Estadio Tres de Marzo
- Apertura 2011: 16th
- Clausura 2012: 18th (relegated)
- Top goalscorer: League: Apertura: Hérculez Gómez (8); Clausura: Fredy Bareiro (4); All: Hérculez Gómez (8)
Home colours	Away colours	Third colours

The 2011–12 Estudiantes Tecos season was the 65th professional season of Mexico's top-flight football league. The season is split into two tournaments—the Torneo Apertura and the Torneo Clausura—each with identical formats and each contested by the same eighteen teams. Estudiantes Tecos began their season on July 22, 2011, against Toluca, Estudiantes tecos play their homes games on Fridays at 8:10pm local time.

On April 14, 2012, Estudiantes Tecos was relegated to the Liga de Ascenso after being last in the relegation percentage table.

== Torneo Apertura ==
=== Squad ===
Note: Flags indicate national team as defined under FIFA eligibility rules; some limited exceptions apply. Players may hold more than one non-FIFA nationality.

No.	Pos.	Nation	Player
1	GK	MEX	Juan Carlos García Rulfo
2	DF	MEX	Oswaldo Alanís
3	DF	MEX	Marcelo Alatorre
4	MF	ARG	Hugo Colace
5	DF	MEX	Duilio Davino
6	MF	MEX	Rafael Medina (Vice-Captain)
7	MF	MEX	José Rodolfo Reyes
8	GK	MEX	Christian Martínez
9	FW	MEX	Eduardo Lillingston
10	FW	CHI	Rodrigo Ruiz *
11	MF	MEX	Braulio Luna
13	DF	MEX	Melvin Brown
14	MF	ARG	Rubens Sambueza
15	FW	MEX	César Moreno

No.	Pos.	Nation	Player
16	FW	USA	Hérculez Gómez
17	DF	MEX	Juan Carlos García Álvarez
18	MF	ARG	Jorge Zamogilny *
19	FW	MEX	Taufic Guarch
20	MF	MEX	Elgabry Rangel (Vice-Captain)
21	DF	MEX	Mario Pérez
22	DF	MEX	Daniel Quintero
23	FW	MEX	Juan Ramón Zazueta
24	MF	MEX	José Ramón Partida
25	DF	MEX	Juan Carlos Leaño (Captain)
26	GK	MEX	José Guadalupe Martínez
27	MF	CHI	Nelson Pinto
28	MF	MEX	Arnhold Rivas

=== Regular season ===
==== Apertura 2011 results ====
July 22, 2011 Round 1	Estudiantes Tecos	1 – 2	Toluca	Estadio Tres de Marzo, Zapopan
20:10	Medina (yellow card) 52'; Sambueza (yellow card) 55'; Colace (yellow card) 64'; Lillingston 65'; Davino (yellow card) 74'	Report	Alonso 6'; Calderón 10'; Ríos (yellow card) 55'; Novaretti (yellow card) 65'	Referee: Óscar Macias

July 30, 2011 Round 2	San Luis	2 – 1	Estudiantes Tecos	Estadio Alfonso Lastras, San Luis Potosí
20:45	González 12'; (yellow card) 13'; Alcántar (yellow card) 45'; Arroyo (yellow card) 83'; Aguirre 90+2' (pen.); Orozco (red card) 90+3'	Report	Gomez 50'; Pérez (yellow card) 64'; Colace (yellow card) 83'; Leaño (yellow card) 90' (red card) 90+3'	Referee: Marco Antonio Rodríguez

August 3, 2011 Round 3	América	1 – 2	Estudiantes Tecos	Estadio Azteca, Mexico City
17:00	Peréz 34' (o.g.); Vusoso (yellow card) 40'; Pimentel (yellow card) 68' (red card) 85'; Valenzuela (yellow card) 77'; Aguilar (red card) 89'	Report	Pinto (yellow card) 11'; Bovaglio (yellow card) 13'; Zamogilny 60'; Sambueza 70'	Referee: Miguel Ángel Flores

August 5, 2011 Round 4	Estudiantes Tecos	0 – 1	UANL	Estadio Tres de Marzo, Zapopan
20:10		Report	Jiménez 62'	Referee: José Alfredo Peñaloza

August 13, 2011 Round 5	Atlas	0 – 2	Estudiantes Tecos	Estadio Jalisco, Guadalajara
20:45	Welcome (yellow card) 57'; Lacerda (yellow card) 67'; Rodríguez (yellow card) 81'	Report	Leaño (yellow card) 6'; Davino 42'; Rangel (yellow card) 45'; Lillingston 86'	Referee: Fabricio Morales

August 19, 2011 Round 6	Estudiantes Tecos	2 – 1	Pachuca	Estadio Tres de Marzo, Zapopan
20:10	Zamogliny (yellow card) 14', (goal) 49'; Lillingston (yellow card) 33'; Alatorre (yellow card) 86'; Gómez 90'	Report	Ayoví 22', (yellow card) 68' (red card) 83'; Rodríguez (yellow card) 29'	Referee: Mauricio Morales

August 27, 2011 Round 7	Atlante	2 – 1	Estudiantes Tecos	Estadio Quintana Roo, Cancún
21:00	Cuevas (yellow card) 15'; Ortiz 26'; Martínez 52' (pen.); Guerrero (yellow card) 58'; Fonseca (yellow card) 62'	Report	Alatorre (red card) 61'; Sambueza (yellow card) 58', (goal) 90+3'; Lillingston (yellow card) 62'	Referee: Ricardo Arellano

September 9, 2011 Round 8	Estudiantes Tecos	0 – 2	Chiapas	Estadio Tres de Marzo, Zapopan
20:10	Sambueza (yellow card) 27'	Report	Fuentes (yellow card) 23'; Rey 59', 61'; J. Hernández (yellow card) 68'; J. Martínez (yellow card) 73'; Razo (yellow card) 90+2'	Referee: Roberto García Orozco

September 18, 2011 Round 9	Tijuana	0 – 2	Estudiantes Tecos	Estadio Caliente, Tijuana
12:00	Arévalo Ríos (yellow card) 12'; Gandolfi (yellow card) 81'	Report	Lillingston (yellow card) 14'; Colace 54'; Bovaglio (yellow card) 73'; Pérez (yellow card) 84'; Sambueza (yellow card) 88'; Gómez 90+2'	Referee: Fernando Guerrero

September 24, 2011 Round 10	Estudiantes Tecos	1 – 2	UNAM	Estadio Tres de Marzo, Zapopan
19:00	Lillingston (yellow card) 7'; Gómez 28'; Colace (yellow card) 83'; Leaño (yellow card) 90+3'	Report	Cortés 12'; Palencia (yellow card) 15', (goal) 62'; Verón (yellow card) 33'; Ramírez (yellow card) 62'	Referee: Jorge Eduardo Gassso

October 1, 2011 Round 11	Morelia	0 – 2	Estudiantes Tecos	Estadio Morelos, Morelia
17:00	Huiqui (yellow card) 52'	Report	Leaño (yellow card) 36', (goal) 58'; Lillinston 64'; Sambueza (yellow card) 56'; Zamogliny (yellow card) 82'; Medina (yellow card) 87'	Referee: Paul Delgadillo

October 7, 2011 Round 12	Estudiantes Tecos	2 – 3	Monterrey	Estadio Tres de Marzo, Zapopan
20:10	Luna (yellow card) 28'; Bovaglio (yellow card) 33'; Pinto (yellow card) 41' (yellow-red card) 54'; Rangel 68'; Zamongliny (red card) 73'; Gómez 90+5'	Report	Cardozo 10', (yellow card) 50'; Carreñno 22'; Corona 80'; Bastanta (yellow card) 88'	Referee: Marco Antonio Rodríguez

October 15, 2011 Round 13	Guadalajara	5 – 2	Estudiantes Tecos	Estadio Omnilife, Zapopan
19:00	Torres 7', 56'; Fabián 32', 37', 55', (yellow card) 32'; Álvarez (yellow card) 62' (yellow-red card) 68'; Quirate (manager) (red card) 63'; Araujo (yellow card) 73'; Magallón (yellow card) 84'	Report	Colace (yellow card) 26'; Lillingston 53', (yellow card) 76'; Gómez 74'	Referee: Miguel Ángel Flores

October 22, 2011 Round 14	Estudiantes Tecos	5 – 2	Santos Laguna	Estadio Tres de Marzo, Zapopan
17:00	Gómez 3', 15'; Luna 83'; Lillingston 85'; Sambueza 87'	Report	Salinas (red card) 33'; Mares (yellow card) 46'; Quintero 47'; Estrada 70'; Hoyos (yellow card) 73'	Referee: Mauricio Morales

October 26, 2011 Round 15	Puebla	2 – 1	Estudiantes Tecos	Estadio Cuauhtémoc, Puebla
20:00	Riascos 8'; Ortiz (yellow card) 40'; Silva 59'; Polo (yellow card) 66'	Report	Pérez (yellow card) 21'; Davino (yellow card) 69'; Ruiz 90+1'	Referee: Jorge Antonio Pérez

October 30, 2011 Round 16	Estudiantes Tecos	0 – 2	Cruz Azul	Estadio Tres de Marzo, Zapopan
12:00	Bovaglio (yellow card) 47'; Davino (yellow card) 81'	Report	Giménez 49' (pen.); Villa 61'	Referee: Fernando Guerrero

November 5, 2011 Round 17	Querétaro	3 – 0	Estudiantes Tecos	Estadio Corregidora, Querétaro
17:00	Rico (yellow card) 11'; Martínez (yellow card) 59', (goal) 68'; Bautista 62'; Bueno (yellow card) 70'; Ponce 82'	Report	Bovaglio (yellow card) 24'; Leaño (yellow card) 31'; Zamongilny (yellow card) 69'; Alatorre (yellow card) 79'	Referee: Erim Ramírez

Estudiantes Tecos did not qualify to the Final Phase

=== Goalscorers ===
Position	Nation	Name	Goals scored
1	(United States)	Herculez Gómez	8
2	(Mexico)	Eduardo Lillingston	5
3	(Argentina)	Rubens Sambueza	3
4	(Argentina)	Damián Zamogilny	2
5	(Argentina)	Hugo Colace	1
5	(Mexico)	Duilio Davino	1
5	(Mexico)	Juan Carlos Leaño	1
5	(Mexico)	Braulio Luna	1
5	(Mexico)	Elgabry Rangel	1
5	(Chile)	Rodrigo Ruiz	1
TOTAL			24

=== Results ===
==== Results summary ====
Overall								Home						Away					
Pld	W	D	L	GF	GA	GD	Pts	W	D	L	GF	GA	GD	W	D	L	GF	GA	GD
17	6	0	11	24	30	−6	18	2	0	6	11	15	−4	4	0	5	13	15	−2

Last updated: 5 November 2011.
Source: Apertura 2011 results

==== Results by round ====
Round	1	2	3	4	5	6	7	8	9	10	11	12	13	14	15	16	17
Ground	H	A	A	H	A	H	A	H	A	H	A	H	A	H	A	H	A
Result	L	L	W	L	W	W	L	L	W	L	W	L	L	W	L	L	L
Position	11	14	14	16	9	6	9	13	10	14	9	13	15	11	14	15	16

Updated to match(es) played on 6 November 2011. Source: Apertura 2011 results and mediotiempo.com
A = Away; H = Home; W = Win; D = Draw; L = Loss

== Transfers ==
=== In ===
#	Pos	Nat	Player	Age	From	Date	Notes
	DF	(Mexico)	José Antonio Castro	31	Necaxa	December 5, 2011	
	DF	(Mexico)	Alejandro Castro	24	Cruz Azul	December 9, 2011	
	FW	(Paraguay)	Fredy Bareiro	29	(Paraguay) Cerro Porteño	December 16, 2011	

=== Out ===
#	Pos	Nat	Player	Age	To	Date	Notes
6	DF	(Mexico)	Rafael Medina	32	TBD	December 7, 2011	
16	FW	(United States)	Herculez Gomez	29	Santos Laguna	December 12, 2011	
18	MF	(Argentina)	Jorge Zamogilny	31	Atlas	December 20, 2011	

== Torneo Clausura ==
=== Squad ===
Note: Flags indicate national team as defined under FIFA eligibility rules; some limited exceptions apply. Players may hold more than one non-FIFA nationality.

No.	Pos.	Nation	Player
1	GK	MEX	Juan Carlos García Rulfo
2	DF	MEX	Oswaldo Alanís
3	DF	MEX	Marcelo Alatorre
4	MF	ARG	Hugo Colace
5	DF	MEX	Duilio Davino
6	DF	MEX	Alejandro Castro (on loan from Cruz Azul)
7	MF	MEX	José Rodolfo Reyes
8	FW	MEX	Jorge Alberto Urías
9	FW	MEX	Eduardo Lillingston
10	FW	MEX	Rodrigo Ruiz
11	MF	MEX	Braulio Luna
12	GK	MEX	Rafael Ramírez
14	MF	ARG	Rubens Sambueza
15	FW	MEX	César Moreno
16	MF	MEX	Gerardo Galindo (on loan from Necaxa)

No.	Pos.	Nation	Player
17	MF	MEX	Édgar Solís
18	DF	MEX	José Antonio Castro
19	MF	ARG	Gabriel Pereyra
20	MF	MEX	Elgabry Rangel (Vice-Captain)
21	DF	MEX	Mario Pérez
22	DF	MEX	Daniel Quintero
24	FW	PAR	Fredy Bareiro
25	FW	MEX	Michel Vázquez (on loan from Guadalajara)
26	MF	MEX	Daniel Cisneros
27	DF	MEX	Juan Carlos Leaño (Captain)
28	GK	MEX	José Guadalupe Martínez
29	FW	MEX	Isaac Díaz
30	MF	ARG	Fernando Gutiérrez
31	GK	MEX	Marco Antonio de León
32	MF	MEX	Arnhold Rivas

=== Regular season ===
==== Apertura 2011 results ====
January 8, 2012 Round 1	Toluca	3 – 1	Estudiantes Tecos	Estadio Nemesio Díez, Toluca
12:00	Alonso 57', 81'; Gamboa (yellow card) 63'; Dueñas 64'	Report	Alanis (yellow card) 40'; Pereyra (yellow card) 45+'; Castro (yellow card) 49'; Bareiro 83'	Referee: Francisco Chacón

January 13, 2012 Round 2	Estudiantes Tecos	0 – 2	San Luis	Estadio Tres de Marzo, Zapopan
20:10	Colace (yellow card) 84'	Report	Moreno 19'; Velasco (yellow card) 34'; Aguirre 77', (red card) 92'	Referee: Miguel Ángel Chacón

January 20, 2012 Round 3	Estudiantes Tecos	1 – 1	América	Estadio Tres de Marzo, Zapopan
20:10	Sambueza (yellow card) 15'; Bareiro 39'; Luna (yellow card) 60'; Castro (yellow card) 75'; Colace (yellow card) 89'	Report	Benítez 47'; Adolfo (yellow card) 49'; Mosquera (yellow card) 71'; Vizcarrondo (yellow card) 72'	Referee: Mauricio Morales

January 28, 2012 Round 4	UANL	2 – 1	Estudiantes Tecos	Estadio Universitario, San Nicolás
19:00	Pulido 5'; Rivas 21'; Salcido (yellow card) 69'; Torres Nilo (yellow card) 73'	Report	Castro (yellow card) 26'; Sambueza 55' (pen.); Davino (yellow card) 90'	Referee: Miguel Ángel Ayala

February 3, 2012 Round 5	Estudiantes Tecos	0 – 0	Atlas	Estadio Tres de Marzo, Zapopan
20:10	Leaño (yellow card) 3'; Sambueza (yellow card) 54'; J.A. Castro (yellow card) 15'	Report	Santos (yellow card) 35'; Erpen (yellow card) 41'	Referee: Ricardo Arellano

February 11, 2012 Round 6	Pachuca	2 – 0	Estudiantes Tecos	Estadio Hidalgo, Pachuca
19:00	Arreola 29', (yellow card) 76'; Ledesma (yellow card) 33'; Cejas 42'; Torres (yellow card) 61'; Rojas (yellow card) 77'; Borja (yellow card) 87'	Report	Lillingston (yellow card) 4'; Castro (yellow card) 63'; Sambueza (yellow card) 90+1'	Referee: José Alfredo Peñaloza

February 17, 2012 Round 7	Estudiantes Tecos	2 – 1	Atlante	Estadio Tres de Marzo, Zapopan
20:10	Lillingston 14', (yellow card) 83'; Leaño 31'; Pérez (yellow card) 35'; Alatorre (yellow card) 75'; Martínez (yellow card) 90+2'	Report	Solis (yellow card) 11'; Amione (yellow card) 14'; Arroyo 24'; Jiménez (yellow card) 55'; Guerrero (red card) 90+3'; Martínez (yellow card) 90+3'	Referee: Roberto García Orozco

February 25, 2012 Round 8	Chiapas	1 – 0	Estudiantes Tecos	Estadio Victor Manuel Reyna, Tuxtla Gutiérrez
17:00	Noriega (yellow card) 19'; Rey 29'; Zamorano (yellow card) 55'	Report	Guttiérez (yellow card) 39'; Pérez (yellow card) 44'	Referee: Jorge Antonio Pérez

March 2, 2012 Round 9	Estudiantes Tecos	0 – 2	Tijuana	Estadio Tres de Marzo, Zapopan
20:10	Gutiérrez (yellow card) 54'; Luna (yellow card) 85'; Castro (yellow card) 89'; Davino (red card) 90+3'	Report	Gandolfi (yellow card) 22'; Maya (yellow card) 24'; Riascos (yellow card) 61'; Sand (yellow card) 64', (goal) 68'; Arévalo Ríos 80'	Referee: Fernando Guerrero

March 11, 2012 Round 10	UNAM	0 – 0	Estudiantes Tecos	Estadio Olímpico Universitario, Mexico City
12:00	Espinoza (yellow card) 76' (yellow-red card) 90+1'	Report	Leaño (yellow card) 39'	Referee: Miguel Ángel Chacón

March 16, 2012 Round 11	Estudiantes Tecos	1 – 2	Morelia	Estadio Tres de Marzo, Zapopan
20:10	Bareiro 51'	Report	Lugo 15', 21'; Aldrete (yellow card) 45' (yellow-red card) 60'	Referee: Francisco Chacón

March 24, 2012 Round 12	Monterrey	4 – 0	Estudiantes Tecos	Estadio Tecnológico, Monterrey
17:00	Suazo 1'; Delgado 14'; Reyna 65' (pen.) de Nigris 68'	Report	Leaño (yellow card) 22'; Bareiro (yellow card) 29'	Referee: Ricardo Arellano

April 1, 2012 Round 13	Estudiantes Tecos	1 – 0	Guadalajara	Estadio Tres de Marzo, Zapopan
18:00	Colace (yellow card) 19'; Pérez (yellow card) 21'; Sambueza (yellow card) 45+'; Mejía 85' (o.g.)	Report	Casillas (yellow card) 35'	Referee: Jorge Isaac Rojas

April 7, 2012 Round 14	Santos Laguna	1 – 1	Estudiantes Tecos	Estadio TSM Corona, Torreón
19:00	Sánchez (yellow card) 6'; Quintero 17'; Baloy (yellow card) 53'; Peralta (red card) 54'; Hoyos (yellow card) 90+1'	Report	Leaño (yellow card) 17'; Bareiro 86'	Referee: Antony Zanjuampa

April 13, 2012 Round 15	Estudiantes Tecos	1 – 1	Puebla	Estadio Tres de Marzo, Zapopan
20:10	Sambueza (yellow card) 10', (goal) 87'; Luna (yellow card) 69'	Report	Silva 7'; Zamora (yellow card) 16'; Landín (yellow card) 47'; Álvarez (yellow card) 59'; Pineda (yellow card) 63'; Salinas (yellow card) 88'	Referee: Erim Ramírez

April 21, 2012 Round 16	Cruz Azul	5 – 2	Estudiantes Tecos	Estadio Azul, Mexico City
17:00	Vela (yellow card) 27'; G. Flores 33'; Leaño 43' (o.g.); Perea 62', 73'; Castro 84'	Report	Reyes (yellow card) 29'; Galindo (yellow card) 60'; Pereira 78' (o.g.); Pérez (yellow card) 88'; Lillingston 90+1'	Referee: José Alfredo Peñaloza

April 27, 2012 Round 17	Estudiantes Tecos	1 – 1	Querétaro	Estadio Tres de Marzo, Zapopan
20:10	Sambueza (yellow card) 26'; Luna 63'	Report	Pérez (yellow card) 33', (goal) 80'; García Arías (yellow card) 35'; Romo (yellow card) 90'	Referee: Jorge Antonio Pérez

Estudiantes Tecos did not qualify to the Final Phase

=== Goalscorers ===
Position	Nation	Name	Goals scored
1	(Paraguay)	Fredy Bareiro	4
2	(Argentina)	Rubens Sambueza	2
2.	(Mexico)	Eduardo Lillingston	2
2.		Own Goals	2
5.	(Mexico)	Juan Carlos Leaño	1
5.	(Mexico)	Braulio Luna	1
TOTAL			12

=== Results ===
==== Results summary ====
Overall								Home						Away					
Pld	W	D	L	GF	GA	GD	Pts	W	D	L	GF	GA	GD	W	D	L	GF	GA	GD
17	2	6	9	12	28	−16	12	2	4	3	7	10	−3	0	2	6	5	18	−13

Last updated: 28 April 2012.
Source: Clausura 2012 results

==== Results by round ====
Round	1	2	3	4	5	6	7	8	9	10	11	12	13	14	15	16	17
Ground	A	H	H	A	H	A	H	A	H	A	H	A	H	A	H	A	H
Result	L	L	D	L	D	L	W	L	L	D	L	L	W	D	D	L	W
Position	17	18	17	17	17	17	16	16	17	17	17	17	17	17	17	18	18

Updated to match(es) played on 29 April 2012. Source: Clausura 2012 results and mediotiempo.com
A = Away; H = Home; W = Win; D = Draw; L = Loss
