= 2010–11 Puebla F.C. season =

Puebla
2011–12 season
- Chairman: Ricardo Henaine
- Manager: José Luis Sánchez Solá; José Luis Trejo
- Stadium: Estadio Cuauhtémoc
- Apertura 2010: 12th
- Clausura 2011: 5th Group C

The 2010–11 Puebla season was the 64th professional season of Mexico's top-flight football league. The season is split into two tournaments—the Torneo Apertura and the Torneo Clausura—each with identical formats and each contested by the same eighteen teams. Cruz Azul will begin their season on July 24, 2010, against Guadalajara

== Torneo Apertura ==
=== Squad ===
Note: Flags indicate national team as defined under FIFA eligibility rules; some limited exceptions apply. Players may hold more than one non-FIFA nationality.

No.	Pos.	Nation	Player
1	GK	MEX	Édgar Adolfo Hernández
2	DF	MEX	Orlando Rincón
3	DF	URU	Alejandro Acosta
4	DF	MEX	Juan Carlos De La Barrera
5	DF	MEX	Álvaro Ortiz
7	MF	MEX	José Joel González
8	FW	ARG	Gabriel Pereyra
9	FW	MEX	Mario Ortiz
10	MF	URU	Nicolás Olivera
11	MF	MEX	Edgar Gerardo Lugo
12	GK	MEX	Juan Carlos García Rulfo
13	FW	URU	Álvaro González
14	MF	MEX	Yasser Anwar Corona
15	MF	MEX	Carlos Rivera
16	DF	MEX	Félix Ísael González

No.	Pos.	Nation	Player
17	FW	MEX	Joaquín Peralta
18	DF	MEX	Juan Carlos García Álvarez
19	FW	CAN	Isidro Sánchez
21	FW	MEX	Ariel Alarcón
22	MF	MEX	Pablo Aja
23	DF	MEX	Joaquín Velázquez
25	DF	MEX	José Gustavo Garmendia
26	DF	MEX	Roberto Carlos Juárez
28	FW	MEX	Jorge Zárate
29	MF	MEX	Rodrigo Salinas
30	MF	MEX	Felipe Ayala
31	DF	MEX	Melvin Brown
33	GK	MEX	Alexandro Álvarez
69	FW	MEX	Antonio Baltazar

==== On loan ====
Note: Flags indicate national team as defined under FIFA eligibility rules; some limited exceptions apply. Players may hold more than one non-FIFA nationality.

No.	Pos.	Nation	Player
—	MF	MEX	Sergio Rosas (at Club Tijuana until 2011)
—	GK	MEX	Jorge Villalpando (at Jaguares 2011)

No.	Pos.	Nation	Player
—	FW	MEX	Íñigo Rey (at Durango 2011)
—	FW	MEX	Jair García (at Cruz Azul Hidalgo2011)

=== Regular season ===
July 24, 2010 Round 1	Guadalajara	0 – 0	Puebla	Estadio Jalisco, Guadalajara
7:00pm		Report		Referee: Fernando Guerrero

August 1, 2010 Round 2	Puebla	2 – 1	San Luis	Estadio Cuauhtémoc, Puebla
12:00pm	Olivera 1'; Pereyra 45'	Report	Castillo 65'	Referee: Jesús Fabricio Morales

August 8, 2010 Round 3	Estudiantes Tecos	1 – 3	Puebla	Estadio Tres de Marzo, Zapopan
5:00pm	Cejas 27' (pen.)	Report	González 11'; Pereyra 19'; Lugo 87'	Referee: Miguel Ángel Ayala

August 15, 2010 Round 4	Puebla	1 – 1	Atlante	Estadio Cuauhtémoc, Puebla
12:00pm	Amione 51'	Report	Lugo 85'	Referee: Jaime Herrera Garduño

August 22, 2010 Round 5	UNAM	4 – 1	Puebla	Estadio Olímpico Universitario, Mexico City
12:00pm	López 26', 89'; Cacho 70', 78'	Report	Rincón 64'	Referee: Miguel Ángel Ortega

August 29, 2010 Round 6	Puebla	3 – 1	Pachuca	Estadio Cuauhtémoc, Puebla
12:00pm	Pereyra 65'; Juárez 85'; Acosta 89'	Report	Manso 64'	Referee: José Alfredo Peñaloza

September 11, 2010 Round 7	Chiapas	4 – 0	Puebla	Estadio Victor Manuel Reyna, Tuxtla Gutierrez
5:00pm	Ochoa 42', 55'; Valdéz 52'; Rodríguez 59'	Report		Referee: Paul Delgadillo

September 19, 2010 Round 8	Puebla	1 – 3	UANL	Estadio Cuauhtémoc, Puebla
12:00pm	Pereyra 64'	Report	Itamar 22', 28', 36'	Referee: Roberto García

September 25, 2010 Round 9	Atlas	1 – 0	Puebla	Estadio Jalisco, Guadalajara
8:45pm	Moreno 13'	Report		Referee: Jorge Macías Romo

October 3, 2010 Round 10	Puebla	2 – 0	Querétaro	Estadio Cuauhtémoc, Puebla
12:00pm	Olivera 65'; Salinas 70'	Report		Referee: Jorge Gasso

October 8, 2010 Round 11	Necaxa	1 – 0	Puebla	Estadio Victoria, Aguascalientes
8:00pm	Pavlovich 28'	Report		Referee: Miguel Ángel Ayala

October 17, 2010 Round 12	Puebla	2 – 2	América	Estadio Cuauhtémoc, Puebla
12:00pm	Márquez 9', 40'	Report	Pereyra 25', 82'	Referee: Fernando Guerrero

October 24, 2010 Round 13	Toluca	2 – 1	Puebla	Estadio Nemesio Díez, Toluca
12:00pm	Sinha 44'; Mancilla 70'	Report	Pereyra 18'	Referee: Miguel Ángel Flores

October 27, 2010 Round 14	Puebla	0 – 1	Santos Laguna	Estadio Cuauhtémoc, Puebla
8:00pm		Report	Estrada 67'	Referee: Rafael Medina

October 30, 2010 Round 15	Cruz Azul	1 – 0	Puebla	Estadio Azul, Mexico City
5:00pm	Giménez 80'	Report		Referee: Marco Antonio Rodríguez

November 6, 2010 Round 16	Puebla	2 – 0	Monterrey	Estadio Cuauhtémoc, Puebla
12:00pm	Ayala 28'; Corona 90+1'	Report		Referee: Roberto García

November 14, 2010 Round 17	Morelia	3 – 3	Puebla	Estadio Morelos, Morelia
12:00pm	Droguett 2'; Sabah 48', 79'	Report	Pereyra 8'; Ortiz 31'; Olivera 86'	Referee: Mauricio Morales

=== Goalscorers ===
Position	Nation	Name	Goals scored
1.	(Argentina)	Gabriel Pereyra	8
2.	(Uruguay)	Nicolás Olivera	3
3.	(Mexico)	Edgar Lugo	2
4.	(Uruguay)	Alejandro Acosta	1
4.	(Mexico)	Felipe Ayala	1
4.	(Mexico)	Yasser Corona	1
4.	(Uruguay)	Álvaro González	1
4.	(Mexico)	Roberto Juárez	1
4.	(Mexico)	Álvaro Ortiz	1
4.	(Mexico)	Orlando Rincón	1
4.	(Mexico)	Rodrigo Salinas	1
TOTAL			21

=== Results ===
==== Results summary ====
Overall								Home						Away					
Pld	W	D	L	GF	GA	GD	Pts	W	D	L	GF	GA	GD	W	D	L	GF	GA	GD
17	5	4	8	21	26	−5	19	4	2	2	13	9	+4	1	2	6	8	17	−9

Last updated: 15 January 2011.
Source: Apertura 2010 results

==== Results by round ====
Round	1	2	3	4	5	6	7	8	9	10	11	12	13	14	15	16	17
Ground	A	H	A	H	A	H	A	H	A	H	A	H	A	H	A	H	A
Result	D	W	W	D	L	W	L	L	L	W	L	D	L	L	L	W	D
Position	12	6	2	4	8	4	5	10	11	8	12	13	13	14	15	13	13

Updated to match(es) played on 15 January 2011. Source: Apertura 2010 results and mediotiempo.com
A = Away; H = Home; W = Win; D = Draw; L = Loss

== Torneo Clausura ==
=== Squad ===
Note: Flags indicate national team as defined under FIFA eligibility rules; some limited exceptions apply. Players may hold more than one non-FIFA nationality.

No.	Pos.	Nation	Player
1	GK	MEX	Edgar Hernández
2	DF	MEX	Orlando Rincón
3	DF	URU	Alejandro Acosta
4	DF	BRA	Flavio Rogerio
5	DF	MEX	Álvaro Ortiz
6	MF	MEX	León Fernando Vázquez
7	MF	MEX	José Joel González
8	MF	ARG	Gabriel Pereyra
9	FW	ECU	Félix Borja
10	MF	ARG	Walter Jiménez
11	MF	MEX	Édgar Lugo
12	DF	MEX	César Cercado
14	DF	MEX	Yasser Corona
15	DF	USA	Edgar Castillo

No.	Pos.	Nation	Player
16	DF	MEX	Guillermo Cerda
18	FW	MEX	Brayan Martinez
19	FW	MEX	Aarón Padilla
20	MF	MEX	Alejandro Argüello
22	MF	MEX	Pablo Aja
23	FW	PAR	Nelson Cuevas
25	DF	MEX	José Gustavo Garmendia
26	DF	MEX	Roberto Juárez
28	MF	MEX	Jorge Zárate
29	MF	MEX	Rodrigo Salinas
30	MF	MEX	Felipe de Jesús Ayala
31	DF	MEX	Melvin Brown
33	GK	MEX	Alexandro Álvarez
156	FW	MEX	Isidro Sánchez

=== Regular season ===
January 9, 2011 Round 1	Puebla	1 – 1	Guadalajara	Estadio Cuauhtémoc, Puebla
12:00pm	Borja 54'	Report	Lugo 8' (o.g.)	Referee: Ricardo Arellano

January 15, 2011 Round 2	San Luis	3 – 0	Puebla	Estadio Alfonso Lastras, San Luis Potosí
5:00pm	Arce 19'; Wilmer Aguirre 60', 67' (pen.)	Report		Referee: Miguel Ángel Ayala

January 23, 2011 Round 3	Puebla	2 – 0	Estudiantes Tecos	Estadio Cuauhtémoc, Puebla
12:00pm	Lugo 57'; Borja 90'	Report		Referee: Jorge Eduardo Gasso

January 29, 2011 Round 4	Atlante	2 – 0	Puebla	Estadio Quintana Roo, Cancún
9:00pm	Corona 39' (o.g.); Bermúdez 88'	Report		Referee: Marco Antonio Rodríguez

February 6, 2011 Round 5	Puebla	0 – 1	UNAM	Estadio Cuauhtémoc, Puebla
12:00pm		Report	Orrantia 89'	Referee: José Alfredo Peñaloza

February 12, 2011 Round 6	Pachuca	1 – 0	Puebla	Estadio Hidalgo, Pachuca
7:00pm	Aguilar 69'	Report		Referee: Jaime Herrera

February 20, 2011 Round 7	Puebla	1 – 0	Chiapas	Estadio Cuauhtémoc, Puebla
12:00pm	Borja 41'	Report		Referee: Mauricio Morales

February 26, 2011 Round 8	UANL	3 – 0	Puebla	Estadio Universitario, San Nicolás
7:00pm	Mancilla 24'; Álvarez 42'; Ochoa 87'	Report		Referee: Miguel Ángel Chacón

March 6, 2011 Round 9	Puebla	2 – 0	Atlas	Estadio Cuauhtémoc, Puebla
12:00pm	Lugo 2', 65'	Report		Referee: Roberto García Orozco

March 12, 2011 Round 10	Querétaro	2 – 1	Puebla	Estadio Corregidora, Querétaro
5:00pm	Borelli 27'; Acuña 37'	Report	González 52'	Referee: Miguel Ángel Ortega

March 20, 2011 Round 11	Puebla	1 – 0	Necaxa	Estadio Cuauhtémoc, Puebla
12:00pm	Corona 80'	Report		Referee: Erim Ramírez

April 3, 2011 Round 12	América	5 – 4	Puebla	Estadio Azteca, Mexico City
4:00pm	Reyna 13', 19', 33'; Sánchez 22', 71'	Report	Borja 42'; Juárez 57'; Acosta 67'; Pereyra 74'	Referee: Paul Delgadillo

April 10, 2011 Round 13	Puebla	1 – 1	Toluca	Estadio Cuauhtémoc, Puebla
12:00pm	Castillo 90'	Report	Cerda 84'	Referee: Jose Eduardo Gasso

April 13, 2011 Round 14	Santos Laguna	4 – 0	Puebla	Estadio Corona, Torreón
7:00pm	Ludueña 16', 35'; Benítez 59'; Toledo 66'	Report		Referee: Miguel Ángel Ortega

April 16, 2011 Round 15	Puebla	2 – 0	Cruz Azul	Estadio Cuauhtémoc, Puebla
7:00pm	Borja 27'; Jiménez 45'	Report		Referee: Mauricio Morales

April 23, 2011 Round 16	Monterrey	1 − 1	Puebla	Estadio Tecnológico, Monterrey
7:00pm	Zavala 23'	Report	Borja 7'	Referee: Erim Ramírez

May 1, 2011 Round 17	Puebla	0 – 2	Morelia	Estadio Cuauhtémoc, Puebla
12:00pm		Report	Hernández 73', 84'	Referee: Juan Genaro Medrano

=== Goalscorers ===
Position	Nation	Name	Goals scored
1.	(Ecuador)	Félix Borja	6
2.	(Mexico)	Edgar Lugo	3
3.	(Uruguay)	Alejandro Acosta	1
3.	(United States)	Edgar Castillo	1
3.	(Mexico)	Yasser Corona	1
3.	(Mexico)	José Joel González	1
3.	(Argentina)	Walter Jiménez	1
3.	(Mexico)	Roberto Juárez	1
3.	(Argentina)	Gabriel Pereyra	1
TOTAL			16

=== Results ===
==== Results summary ====
Overall								Home						Away					
Pld	W	D	L	GF	GA	GD	Pts	W	D	L	GF	GA	GD	W	D	L	GF	GA	GD
17	6	2	9	16	26	−10	20	6	1	2	10	5	+5	0	1	7	6	21	−15

Last updated: 6 May 2011.
Source: Clausura 2011 results

==== Results by round ====
Round	1	2	3	4	5	6	7	8	9	10	11	12	13	14	15	16	17
Ground	H	A	H	A	H	A	H	A	H	A	H	A	H	A	H	A	H
Result	D	L	W	L	L	L	W	L	W	L	W	L	D	L	W	D	L
Position	9	15	10	15	16	16	15	17	14	15	12	15	16	16	13	13	14

Updated to match(es) played on 6 May 2011. Source: Clausura 2011 results and mediotiempo.com
A = Away; H = Home; W = Win; D = Draw; L = Loss
