= 2010–11 Estudiantes Tecos season =

The 2010–11 Estudiantes Tecos season was the 64th professional season of Mexico's top-flight football league. The season is split into two tournaments—the Torneo Apertura and the Torneo Clausura—each with identical formats and each contested by the same eighteen teams. Estudiantes Tecos began their season on July 24, 2010 against Cruz Azul, Estudiantes Tecos played their homes games on Fridays at 8 p.m. local time.

== Torneo Apertura ==
=== Squad ===
Current squad as of November 16, 2009 Note: Flags indicate national team as defined under FIFA eligibility rules; some limited exceptions apply. Players may hold more than one non-FIFA nationality.

No.	Pos.	Nation	Player
1	GK	MEX	Rafael Ramírez
2	DF	MEX	Oswaldo Alanis
3	DF	MEX	Marcelo Alatorre
4	DF	ARG	Gustavo Cabral
5	MF	MEX	Alberto Ramírez
6	MF	MEX	Rafael Medina
7	DF	MEX	Joel Morales
8	GK	MEX	Christian Martinez
10	MF	ARG	Mauro Cejas
11	FW	MEX	Ramón Morales
13	MF	MEX	Ángel Gustavo Partida
14	MF	ARG	Rubens Sambueza

No.	Pos.	Nation	Player
15	FW	MEX	Miguel Ángel Vallejo
16	FW	PAR	Fredy Bareiro
19	FW	MEX	Taufic Guarch
18	MF	ARG	Jorge Zamogilny
20	MF	MEX	Elgabry Rangel
21	DF	MEX	Diego Jiménez
22	DF	MEX	Daniel Quintero
23	GK	MEX	Mario Rodríguez
25	DF	MEX	José Ramón Partida
26	FW	USA	Samuel Ochoa
27	DF	MEX	Juan Carlos Leaño (Captain)

=== Out on loan ===
Note: Flags indicate national team as defined under FIFA eligibility rules; some limited exceptions apply. Players may hold more than one non-FIFA nationality.

No.	Pos.	Nation	Player
—	FW	MEX	Arnhold Rivas (loan to América)

=== Apertura 2010 results ===
==== Regular season ====
July 23, 2010 Round 1	Estudiantes Tecos	0–3	Cruz Azul	Estadio Tres de Marzo, Zapopan
8:00 p.m.		Report	Orozco 2', 34'; Partida 45' (o.g.)	Referee: Genaro Medrano

July 31, 2010 Round 2	Monterrey	3–2	Estudiantes Tecos	Estadio Tecnológico, Monterrey
5:00 p.m.	Suazo 47'; Ayoví 59'; Santana 66'		Bareiro 36'; Zamogilny 90'	Referee: Erim Ramírez

August 8, 2010 Round 3	Estudiantes Tecos	1–3	Puebla	Estadio Tres de Marzo, Zapopan
5:00 p.m.	Cejas 27' (pen.)	Report	González 11'; Pereyra 19'; Lugo 87'	Referee: Miguel Ángel Ayala

September 5, 2010 Round 4	Guadalajara	3–0	Estudiantes Tecos	Estadio Omnilife, Zapopan
7:00 p.m.	Bravo 37'; Vázquez 74'; Fabián 90'	Report

August 20, 2010 Round 5	Estudiantes Tecos	3–2	San Luis	Estadio Tres de Marzo, Zapopan
12:00 p.m.	Ochoa 23'; Jiménez 73'; Morales 82'	Report	Arroyo 44'; Matellán 78'	Referee: José Alfredo Peñaloza

August 27, 2010 Round 6	Estudiantes Tecos	1–1	Morelia	Estadio Tres de Marzo, Zapopan
8:00 p.m.	Rangel 49'	Report	Lozano 89'	Referee: Marco Antonio Rodríguez

September 11, 2010 Round 7	Atlante	0–1	Estudiantes Tecos	Estadio Andrés Quintana Roo, Cancún
9:00 p.m.		Report	Ramírez 86'	Referee: Fabricio Morales

September 17, 2010 Round 8	Estudiantes Tecos	2–2	UNAM	Estadio Tres de Marzo, Zapopan
8:00 p.m.	Zamogilny 20'; Cejas 85'	Report	Chiapas 38'; Bravo 47'	Referee: Paul Delgadillo

September 25, 2010 Round 9	Pachuca	3–1	Estudiantes Tecos	Estadio Hidalgo, Pachuca
7:00 p.m.	Benítez 44' (pen.); Cvitanich 60'; Gomez 83'	Report	Cejas 85'	Referee: Jaime Herrera

October 1, 2010 Round 10	Estudiantes Tecos	0–0	Chiapas	Estadio Tres de Marzo, Zapopan
8:00 p.m.		Report		Referee: Ricardo Arellano

October 9, 2010 Round 11	UANL	5–0	Estudiantes Tecos	Estadio Universitario, San Nicolás
7:00 p.m.	Juninho 15'; Itamar 18', 66'; Lobos 26'; Álvarez 82'	Report		Referee: Miguel Ángel Flores

October 15, 2010 Round 12	Estudiantes Tecos	2–1	Atlas	Estadio Tres de Marzo, Zapopan
8:00 p.m.	Medina 18'; Ochoa 80'	Report	Santos 24'	Referee: Armando Archundia

October 23, 2010 Round 13	Querétaro	1–0	Estudiantes Tecos	Estadio La Corregidora, Querétaro
5:00 p.m.	Blanco 67'	Report		Referee: Rafael Medina

October 26, 2010 Round 14	Estudiantes Tecos	0–2	Necaxa	Estadio Tres de Marzo, Zapopan
9:00 p.m.		Report	Barbosa 22'; Orozco 77'	Referee: Paul Delgadillo

October 31, 2010 Round 15	América	4–1	Estudiantes Tecos	Estadio Azteca, Mexico City
4:30 p.m.	Márquez 43', 84'; Sánchez 45'; Montenegro 47'	Report	Cejas 54'	Referee: Jorge Gasso

November 5, 2010 Round 16	Estudiantes Tecos	4–2	Toluca	Estadio Tres de Marzo, Zapopan
8:10 p.m.	Cejas 51', 63', 86'; Cisneros 81'	Report	Calderón 48'; Cabral 55' (o.g.)	Referee: Mauricio Morales

November 13, 2010 Round 17	Santos Laguna	1–0	Estudiantes Tecos	Estadio Corona, Torreón
7:00 p.m.	Ludueña 10'	Report		Referee: Armando Archundia

=== Transfers ===
==== In ====
#	Pos	Player	From	Fee	Date	Notes

==== Out ====
Pos	Player	To	Fee	Date	Notes

=== Goalscorers ===
Position	Nation	Name	Goals scored
1.	(Argentina)	Mauro Cejas	7
3.	(United States)	Samuel Ochoa	2
2.	(Argentina)	Damián Zamogilny	2
3.	(Paraguay)	Fredy Bareiro	1
3.	(Mexico)	Daniel Cisneros	1
3.	(Mexico)	Diego Jiménez	1
3.	(Mexico)	Rafael Medina	1
3.	(Mexico)	Ramón Morales	1
3.	(Mexico)	Alberto Ramírez	1
3.	(Mexico)	Elgabry Rangel	1
TOTAL			18

=== Results ===
==== Results summary ====
Overall								Home						Away					
Pld	W	D	L	GF	GA	GD	Pts	W	D	L	GF	GA	GD	W	D	L	GF	GA	GD
17	4	3	10	18	36	−18	15	3	3	3	13	16	−3	1	0	7	5	20	−15

Last updated: 12 January 2011.
Source: Apertura 2010 results

==== Results by round ====
Round	1	2	3	4	5	6	7	8	9	10	11	12	13	14	15	16	17
Ground	H	A	H	A	H	H	A	H	A	H	A	H	A	H	A	H	A
Result	L	L	L	L	W	D	W	D	L	D	L	W	L	L	L	W	L
Position	17	17	17	18	16	16	17	14	17	16	16	16	16	15	18	17	17

Updated to match(es) played on 12 January 2011. Source: Apertura 2010 results and mediotiempo.com
A = Away; H = Home; W = Win; D = Draw; L = Loss

== Torneo Clausura ==
=== Squad ===
Current squad as of January 7, 2011

Note: Flags indicate national team as defined under FIFA eligibility rules; some limited exceptions apply. Players may hold more than one non-FIFA nationality.

No.	Pos.	Nation	Player
1	GK	MEX	Juan Carlos García Rulfo
2	DF	MEX	Oswaldo Alanis
3	DF	MEX	Marcelo Alatorre
4	DF	ARG	Gustavo Cabral
5	MF	MEX	Alberto Ramírez
6	MF	MEX	Rafael Medina (Vice-Captain)
7	MF	MEX	Israel López
8	GK	MEX	Christian Martínez
9	FW	MEX	Eduardo Lillingston
10	MF	ARG	Mauro Cejas
11	MF	MEX	Ramón Morales (Vice-Captain)
13	FW	MEX	Ángel Gustavo Partida
14	MF	ARG	Rubens Sambueza
15	MF	MEX	Miguel Ángel Vallejo
16	FW	BOL	José Alfredo Castillo

No.	Pos.	Nation	Player
17	MF	MEX	Juan Carlos García
18	MF	ARG	Damián Zamogilny
19	FW	MEX	Taufic Eduardo Guarch
20	MF	MEX	Elgabry Rangel (Vice-Captain)
21	DF	MEX	Diego Jiménez
22	DF	MEX	Daniel Quintero
23	GK	MEX	Mario Rodríguez
24	MF	USA	Daniel Antúnez
25	DF	MEX	José Ramón Partida
26	FW	USA	Samuel Ochoa
27	DF	MEX	Juan Carlos Leaño (Captain)
32	GK	MEX	Rafael de Jesús Ramírez
40	MF	MEX	César Moreno
48	MF	MEX	Manuel Morán
100	MF	MEX	Daniel Cisneros

=== Out on loan ===
Note: Flags indicate national team as defined under FIFA eligibility rules; some limited exceptions apply. Players may hold more than one non-FIFA nationality.

No.	Pos.	Nation	Player
—	FW	MEX	Arnhold Rivas (loan to América)

=== Regular season ===
January 8, 2011 Round 1	Cruz Azul	4–1	Estudiantes Tecos	Estadio Azul, Mexico City
5:00 p.m.	Villa 6'; Giménez 15'; Palau 37'; Pineda 86' (pen.)	Report	Cejas 18' (pen.)	Referee: Jorge Macías Romo

January 14, 2011 Round 2	Estudiantes Tecos	3–2	Monterrey	Estadio Tres de Marzo, Zapopan
8:10 p.m.	Cejas 24', 45' (pen.); Cabral 28'	Report	Santana 22', 58'	Referee: Miguel Ángel Chacón

January 23, 2011 Round 3	Puebla	2–0	Estudiantes Tecos	Estadio Cuauhtémoc, Puebla
12:00 p.m.	Lugo 57'; Borja 90'	Report		Referee: Jorge Eduardo Gasso

January 28, 2011 Round 4	Estudiantes Tecos	1–0	Guadalajara	Estadio Tres de Marzo, Zapopan
8:10 p.m.	Lillingston 90+3'	Report		Referee: Roberto García

February 5, 2011 Round 5	San Luis	3–2	Estudiantes Tecos	Estadio Alfonso Lastras, San Luis Potosí
9:00 p.m.	Hernández 62'; Cavallo 78'; Aguirre 88' (pen.)	Report	Rangel 20'; Sambueza 14'	Referee: Julio Escobar

February 13, 2011 Round 6	Morelia	4–1	Estudiantes Tecos	Estadio Morelos, Morelia
12:00 p.m.	Sabah 6'; Romero 15', 60'; Rey 84'	Report	Cejas 56'	Referee: Marco Antonio Rodríguez

February 18, 2011 Round 7	Estudiantes Tecos	0–1	Atlante	Estadio Tres de Marzo, Zapopan
8:10 p.m.		Report	Bermudez 56'	Referee: Juan Genaro Medrano

February 27, 2011 Round 8	UNAM	5–1	Estudiantes Tecos	Estadio Olímpico Universitario, Mexico City
12:00 p.m.	Castro 7'; Verón 16'; Cortés 74'; López 83'; Orrantia 90+2'	Report	López 69'	Referee: Miguel Ángel Ortega

March 4, 2011 Round 9	Estudiantes Tecos	1–0	Pachuca	Estadio Tres de Marzo, Zapopan
8:10 p.m.	Cejas 69' (pen.)	Report		Referee: José Alfredo Peñaloza

March 12, 2011 Round 10	Chiapas	0–2	Estudiantes Tecos	Estadio Victor Manuel Reyna, Tuxtla Gutierrez
5:00 p.m.		Report	García 7'; López	Referee: Jorge Eduardo Gasso

March 18, 2011 Round 11	Estudiantes Tecos	0–0	UANL	Estadio Tres de Marzo, Zapopan
8:10 p.m.		Report		Referee: Mauricio Morales

April 2, 2011 Round 12	Atlas	1–1	Estudiantes Tecos	Estadio Jalisco, Guadalajara
8:45 p.m.	Costly 39'	Report	Cejas 27'	Referee: Miguel Ángel Ortega

April 8, 2011 Round 13	Estudiantes Tecos	0–0	Querétaro	Estadio Tres de Marzo, Zapopan
8:10 p.m.		Report		Referee: Ricardo Arellano

April 13, 2011 Round 14	Necaxa	2–2	Estudiantes Tecos	Estadio Victoria, Aguascalientes
7:00 p.m.	Quatrocchi 26'; Suárez 66' (pen.)	Report	López 76'; Lillingston 89'	Referee: Paul Delgadillo

April 17, 2011 Round 15	Estudiantes Tecos	1–3	América	Estadio Tres de Marzo, Zapopan
5:00 p.m.	Alanis 40'		Reyes 49'; Reyna 59', 85'	Referee: Francisco Chacón

April 24, 2011 Round 16	Toluca	4–4	Estudiantes Tecos	Estadio Nemesio Díez, Toluca
12:00 p.m.	Calderón 10'; Sinha 17'; Cerda 32', 39'	Report	Dueñas 47' (o.g.); Lillingston 54', 80'; Leaño 84'	Referee: Miguel Ángel Ortega

April 29, 2011 Round 17	Estudiantes Tecos	1–3	Santos Laguna	Estadio Tres de Marzo, Zapopan
8:10 p.m.	Cejas 10'	Report	Ludueña 21'; Figueroa 75'; Benítez 90'	Referee: Mauricio Morales

=== Goalscorers ===
Position	Nation	Name	Goals scored
1.	(Argentina)	Mauro Cejas	7
2.	(Mexico)	Eduardo Lillingston	4
3.	(Mexico)	Israel López	3
4.	(Mexico)	Juan Carlos García	1
4.	(Argentina)	Rubens Sambueza	1
4.	(Mexico)	Elgabry Rangel	1
4.	(Mexico)	Oswaldo Alanis	1
4.	(Argentina)	Gustavo Cabral	1
4.	(Mexico)	Juan Carlos Leaño	1
4.		Own Goal	1
TOTAL			21

=== Results ===
==== Results summary ====
Overall								Home						Away					
Pld	W	D	L	GF	GA	GD	Pts	W	D	L	GF	GA	GD	W	D	L	GF	GA	GD
17	4	5	8	21	34	−13	17	3	2	3	7	9	−2	1	3	5	14	25	−11

Last updated: 28 April 2011.
Source: Clausura 2011 results

==== Results by round ====
Round	1	2	3	4	5	6	7	8	9	10	11	12	13	14	15	16	17
Ground	A	H	A	H	A	A	H	A	H	A	H	A	H	A	H	A	H
Result	L	W	L	W	L	L	L	L	W	W	D	D	D	D	L	D	L
Position	17	10	15	9	13	14	17	18	16	12	13	12	13	14	15	15	15

Updated to match(es) played on 29 April 2011. Source: Clausura 2011 results and mediotiempo.com
A = Away; H = Home; W = Win; D = Draw; L = Loss
