= 2011–12 C.F. Monterrey season =

Monterrey
2011–12 season
- Chairman: Jorge Urdiales
- Manager: Víctor Manuel Vucetich
- Stadium: Estadio Tecnologico
- Apertura 2011: 11th
- Clausura 2012: 2nd Runners-up
- Champions League: Winners
- FIFA Club World Cup: 5th
- Top goalscorer: League: Apertura: César Delgado (6); Clausura: Aldo de Nigris (11); All: Humberto Suazo (19)
Home colours	Away colours

The 2011–12 Monterrey season was the 65th professional season of Mexico's top-flight football league. The season is split into two tournaments—the Torneo Apertura and the Torneo Clausura—each with identical formats and each contested by the same eighteen teams. Monterrey began their season on July 23, 2011, against Chiapas, Monterrey play their homes games on Saturdays at 5:00pm local time.

In addition to the Primera División, Monterrey will play in the 2011–12 edition of the CONCACAF Champions League, in which they are the defending champions. Monterrey earned a direct berth into group stage by winning the 2010 Apertura. They opened their Champions League campaign on August 17, 2011, against Herediano of Costa Rica.

Monterrey won the CONCACAF Champions League for the second year and qualified to the 2012 FIFA Club World Cup when they defeated Santos Laguna in the final.

== Torneo Apertura ==
=== Squad ===
Note: Flags indicate national team as defined under FIFA eligibility rules; some limited exceptions apply. Players may hold more than one non-FIFA nationality.

No.	Pos.	Nation	Player
1	GK	MEX	Jonathan Orozco
2	DF	MEX	Severo Meza
4	DF	MEX	Ricardo Osorio
5	DF	MEX	Dárvin Chávez
6	DF	MEX	Héctor Morales
8	MF	MEX	Luis Ernesto Pérez (Captain)
9	FW	MEX	Aldo de Nigris
11	FW	MEX	Sergio Santana
13	FW	MEX	Abraham Darío Carreño
15	DF	ARG	José María Basanta (Vice-Captain)
16	MF	MEX	Luis Alfonso Rodríguez
17	MF	MEX	Jesús Zavala
18	MF	ARG	Neri Cardozo
19	FW	ARG	César Delgado
20	MF	ECU	Walter Ayoví

No.	Pos.	Nation	Player
21	DF	MEX	Hiram Mier
22	DF	MEX	William Paredes
23	GK	MEX	Juan de Dios Ibarra
24	DF	MEX	Sergio Pérez
25	MF	MEX	Jesús Manuel Corona
26	FW	CHI	Humberto Suazo
27	DF	MEX	Oscar Sebastián Garcia
29	DF	MEX	Eduardo Guevara
31	DF	MEX	César Martínez
32	GK	MEX	Jesús Dautt
33	MF	MEX	Marvin Piñón
39	MF	MEX	César de la Peña
44	FW	MEX	Roger Llergo
65	FW	MEX	Marcelo Cazaubón
69	FW	MEX	Luis Madrigal

=== Regular season ===
Win Draw Loss

==== Apertura 2011 results ====
July 24, 2011 Round 1	Chiapas	1 – 4	Monterrey	Estadio Victor Manuel Reyna, Tuxtla Gutierrez
18:00	Rey 25' (pen.); Espinoza (yellow card) 26'; Hernández (yellow card) 47'; Flores (yellow card) 59'; Valdéz (yellow card) 60'	report	L. Pérez 15' (pen.), 45' (pen.); Paredes (yellow card) 24'; Zavala (yellow card) 44'; Cardozo 90'; S. Pérez 90+2'	Referee: Miguel Ángel Ortega

July 30, 2011 Round 2	Monterrey	4 – 2	Tijuana	Estadio Tecnológico, Monterrey
19:00	Santana 40'; L. Pérez 49' (pen.); Ayoví 71'; Delgado 72'		Moreno 25'; Corona 29'; Arce (yellow card) 39'; Leandro (yellow card) 67'	Referee: César Arturo Ramos

August 3, 2011 Round 3	UNAM	2 – 1	Monterrey	Estadio Olímpico Universitario, Mexico City
21:00	Fuentes (yellow card) 20'; Velarde 25'; Herrera 90+1'	Report	Cardozo 32'; Morales (yellow card) 79'	Referee: Erim Ramírez

August 6, 2011 Round 4	Monterrey	2 – 0	Morelia	Estadio Tecnológico, Monterrey
21:00	S. Pérez (yellow card) 52'; Suazo 85'; Carreño 90'	Report	Huiqui (yellow card) 17'; Ramírez (yellow card) 32'	Referee: Fernando Guerrero

August 13, 2011 Round 5	San Luis	1 – 0	Monterrey	Estadio Alfonso Lastras, San Luis Potosí
17:00	Sánchez 11'; Matellán (yellow card) 62'; González (yellow card) 71'; Correa (yellow card) 82'; Alcántar (yellow card) 90+3'	Report	Paredes (yellow card) 65'; Delgado (yellow card) 75'	Referee: Mauricio Morales

August 20, 2011 Round 6	Guadalajara	2 – 1	Monterrey	Estadio Omnilife, Zapopan
19:00	Fabián 28' (pen.), (yellow card) 39'; Ponce (yellow card) 43'; Medina 78'	Report	S. Perez (yellow card) 13'; Delgado 24'; Cardozo (yellow card) 29'; Mier (yellow card) 45'; Chávez (red card) 59'	Referee: Marco Antonio Rodríguez

August 27, 2011 Round 7	Monterrey	2 – 0	Santos Laguna	Estadio Tecnológico, Monterrey
19:00	L. Pérez 28'; Bastana (red card); Suazo (yellow card) 44', (goal) 66'	Report	Baloy (yellow card) 31'; Hoyos (yellow card) 63'	Referee: Juan Genaro Medrano

September 11, 2011 Round 8	Puebla	3 – 3	Monterrey	Estadio Cuauhtémoc, Puebla
12:00	Luis García (yellow card) 8'; Álvarez (yellow card) 9'; Romo 67', 79'; Riascos (yellow card) 69'; Juárez 72'	Report	L. Pérez (yellow card) 8', (goal) 90+4'; Suazo 11'; Zavala (yellow card) 21'; Delgado 58', (yellow card) 71' de Nigris (yellow card) 60'; Meza (yellow card) 81'; Vucetich (red card) 81' (manager)	Referee: Óscar Macias

September 17, 2011 Round 9	Monterrey	1 – 2	Cruz Azul	Estadio Tecnológico, Monterrey
17:00	Delgado 10'; S. Pérez (yellow card) 22'; L. Pérez (yellow card) 25'; Basanta (yellow card) 61' de Nigris (yellow card) 68' (red card) 80'	Report	Villaluz 4'; Araujo (yellow card) 34'; Perea 50'; Pinto (yellow card) 77'; Giménez (yellow card) 83'	Referee: Jorge Isaac Rojas

September 24, 2011 Round 10	Querétaro	2 – 1	Monterrey	Estadio Corregidora, Querétaro
17:00	Mena 34'; Jiménez (yellow card) 35'; Bueno 59'; Mondragón (red card) 86'	Report	Bastanta (yellow card) 22'; Chávez (yellow card) 49'; S. Pérez (yellow card) 62' (yellow-red card) 64'; Suazo 74' (pen.); Osorio (yellow card) 83'; Mier (red card) 86'	Referee: Miguel Ángel Ayala

October 1, 2011 Round 11	Monterrey	0 – 0	Toluca	Estadio Tecnológico, Monterrey
19:00		Report	Sinha (yellow card) 45'; Gamboa (yellow card) 47'; Novaretti (yellow card) 65'	Referee: Francisco Chacón

October 7, 2011 Round 12	Estudiantes Tecos	2 – 3	Monterrey	Estadio Tres de Marzo, Zapopan
20:10	Luna (yellow card) 28'; Bovaglio (yellow card) 33'; Pinto (yellow card) 41' (yellow-red card) 54'; Rangel 68'; Zamongliny (red card) 73'; Gómez 90+5'	Report	Cardozo 10', (yellow card) 50'; Carreñno 22'; Corona 80'; Bastanta (yellow card) 88'	Referee: Marco Antonio Rodríguez

October 15, 2011 Round 13	Monterrey	0 – 3	América	Estadio Tecnológico, Monterrey
17:00	Mier (yellow card) 38'; Osorio (yellow card) 62'; Santana (yellow card) 90+5'	Report	Martínez (yellow card) 8', (goal) 41'; Treviño (yellow card) 55'; Montenegro (yellow card) 60'; Rojas 68'; Mosquera 75'	Referee: Fabricio Morales

October 22, 2011 Round 14	UANL	0 – 0	Monterrey	Estadio Universitario, San Nicolás
19:00	Torres Nilo (yellow card) 4'; Salcido (yellow card) 90'	Report	L. Pérez (yellow card) 59'; S. Pérez (yellow card) 74'	Referee: Paul Delgadillo

October 26, 2011 Round 15	Monterrey	2 – 0	Atlas	Estadio Tecnológico, Monterrey
20:00	Suazo 60'; Osorio (yellow card) 69'; Santana (yellow card) 82'; Delgado (yellow card) 87'; S. Pérez 90+2'	Report	Santos (yellow card) 40'; Jiménez (yellow card) 65'; Barraza (yellow card) 82'; Lacerda (yellow card) 84'; Télles (yellow card) 89'	Referee: Fernando Guerrero

October 29, 2011 Round 16	Pachuca	4 – 0	Monterrey	Estadio Hidalgo, Pachuca
19:00	Esqueda 14', 48'; Borja 33'; Cejas 75', (yellow card) 76'	Report		Referee: Francisco Chacón

November 5, 2011 Round 17	Monterrey	3 – 2	Atlante	Estadio Tecnológico, Monterrey
17:00	Delgado 26', 62', (yellow card) 78'; Zavala 75'; Mier (yellow card) 77'; Cardozo (red card) 81'	Report	Guadarrama 70'; Cuevas (yellow card) 73'; Maldonado 78'; Diego (yellow card) 90+1'	Referee: Mauricio Morales

Monterrey did not qualify to the Final Phase

=== Goalscorers ===
Position	Nation	Name	Goals scored
1.	(Argentina)	César Delgado	6
2.	(Mexico)	Luis Ernesto Pérez	5
2.	(Chile)	Humberto Suazo	5
4.	(Argentina)	Neri Cardozo	3
5.	(Mexico)	Darío Carreño	2
5.	(Mexico)	Sergio Pérez	2
7.	(Ecuador)	Walter Ayoví	1
7.	(Mexico)	Darío Carreño	1
7.	(Mexico)	Jesús Manuel Corona	1
7.	(Mexico)	Sergio Santana	1
7.	(Mexico)	Jesús Zavala	1
TOTAL			27

=== Results ===
==== Results summary ====
Overall								Home						Away					
Pld	W	D	L	GF	GA	GD	Pts	W	D	L	GF	GA	GD	W	D	L	GF	GA	GD
17	7	3	7	27	26	+1	24	5	1	2	14	9	+5	2	2	5	13	17	−4

Last updated: 5 November 2011.
Source: Apertura 2011 results

==== Results by round ====
Round	1	2	3	4	5	6	7	8	9	10	11	12	13	14	15	16	17
Ground	A	H	A	H	A	A	H	A	H	A	H	A	H	A	H	A	H
Result	W	W	L	W	L	L	W	D	L	L	D	W	L	D	W	L	W
Position	2	2	3	2	3	5	4	5	6	11	13	8	8	10	8	10	11

Updated to match(es) played on 6 November 2011. Source: Apertura 2011 results and mediotiempo.com
A = Away; H = Home; W = Win; D = Draw; L = Loss

== Transfers ==
=== In ===
#	Pos	Nat	Player	Age	From	Date	Notes
	FW	(Mexico)	Othoniel Arce	22	San Luis	November 25, 2011	
	MF	(Mexico)	Ángel Reyna	27	América	December 21, 2011	

=== Out ===
#	Pos	Nat	Player	Age	To	Date	Notes
22	DF	(Mexico)	William Paredes	26	San Luis	November 25, 2011	
33	MF	(Mexico)	Marvin Piñón	20	Correcaminos	December 17, 2011	

== Torneo Clausura ==
=== Squad ===
Note: Flags indicate national team as defined under FIFA eligibility rules; some limited exceptions apply. Players may hold more than one non-FIFA nationality.

No.	Pos.	Nation	Player
1	GK	MEX	Jonathan Orozco
2	DF	MEX	Severo Meza
4	DF	MEX	Ricardo Osorio
5	DF	MEX	Dárvin Chávez
6	DF	MEX	Héctor Morales
7	FW	MEX	Othoniel Arce
8	MF	MEX	Luis Ernesto Perez
9	FW	MEX	Aldo de Nigris
10	MF	MEX	Ángel Reyna
13	FW	MEX	Abraham Darío Carreño
15	DF	ARG	José María Basanta (Vice-Captain)
17	MF	MEX	Jesús Zavala
18	MF	ARG	Neri Cardozo

No.	Pos.	Nation	Player
19	FW	ARG	César Delgado
20	MF	ECU	Walter Ayoví
21	DF	MEX	Hiram Mier
23	GK	MEX	Juan de Dios Ibarra
24	DF	MEX	Sergio Pérez
25	MF	MEX	Jesús Manuel Corona
26	FW	CHI	Humberto Suazo
27	DF	MEX	Óscar Sebastián García
32	GK	MEX	Alejandro Dautt
39	MF	MEX	César de la Peña
65	FW	MEX	Marcelo Cazaubón
69	FW	MEX	Luis Madrigal
73	FW	MEX	Marcelo Gracia

=== Regular season ===
Win Draw Loss

==== Clausura 2012 results ====
January 7, 2012 Round 1	Monterrey	2 – 1	Chiapas	Estadio Tecnológico, Monterrey
19:00	Mier (yellow card) 34'; Ayoví 53', 55'; Chávez (yellow card) 63'	Report	Zamorano (yellow card) 69'; Fuentes (yellow card) 70'; J. Martínez 80'	Referee: Jorge Eduardo Gasso

January 14, 2012 Round 2	Tijuana	1 – 0	Monterrey	Estadio Caliente, Tijuana
18:00	Leandro (yellow card) 38'; Arce (yellow card) 62'; Gandolfi 90+2'	Report	Zavala 52'; Mier 90+1'	Referee: Miguel Ángel Ortega

January 21, 2012 Round 3	Monterrey	1 – 1	UNAM	Estadio Tecnológico, Monterrey
17:00	L. Pérez (yellow card) 50'; Arce 61'; Reyna (yellow card) 74'; Corona (yellow card) 90+2'	Report	Cacho 26'	Referee: Miguel Ángel Chacón

January 27, 2012 Round 4	Morelia	0 – 0	Monterrey	Estadio Morelos, Morelia
20:10	Sabha (yellow card) 14'; Lozano (yellow card) 41' (yellow-red card) 58'; Ramírez (yellow card) 90+2'	Report	Basanta (yellow card) 24'; Arce (yellow card) 85'; Zavala (yellow card) 90+1'	Referee: Erim Ramírez

February 4, 2012 Round 5	Monterrey	3 – 0	San Luis	Estadio Tecnológico, Monterrey
17:00	de Nigris 30'; Delgado 34'; Zavala 55'	Report	Matellán (yellow card) 23'; Chiapas (yellow card) 27' (yellow-red card) 59'	Referee: Francisco Chacón

February 11, 2012 Round 6	Monterrey	2 – 0	Guadalajara	Estadio Tecnológico, Monterrey
17:00	de Nigris 70'; Reyna 77'; Zavala (yellow card) 90'	Report	Medina (yellow card) 17'	Referee: Mauricio Morales

February 19, 2012 Round 7	Santos Laguna	1 – 1	Monterrey	Estadio TSM Corona, Torreón
19:00	Sánchez (yellow card) 51'; Galindo 81'	Report	Mier (yellow card) 36'; Pérez 53'	Referee: César Arturo Ramos

February 25, 2012 Round 8	Monterrey	2 – 1	Puebla	Estadio Tecnológico, Monterrey
17:00	Suazo 5' de Nigris 51'; Carreño (yellow card) 90'	Report	Silva 37'; Zamora (yellow card) 63'; Pineda (yellow card) 70'; Wila (yellow card) 90+1'; Martínez (yellow card) 90+3'	Referee: Óscar Macias

March 3, 2012 Round 9	Cruz Azul	4 – 3	Monterrey	Estadio Azul, Mexico City
17:00	Giménez 24' (pen.), 53', (yellow card) 46'; Bravo 57'; Villa 82', (yellow card) 83'; Corona (yellow card) 90+3'	Report	de Nigris 19'; Basanta (yellow card) 48', (goal) 90+4'; Suazo (yellow card) 68', (goal) 69'; L. Pérez (yellow card) 73'	Referee: Antony Zanjuampa

March 10, 2012 Round 10	Monterrey	4 – 1	Querétaro	Estadio Tecnológico, Monterrey
17:00	Chávez 50', (yellow card) 73' de Nigris 56', 89'; Delgado 61'; Reyna (yellow card) 62'; Meza (yellow card) 85'	Report	Rico (yellow card) 56'; Jiménez (yellow card) 63'; Romo 83'	Referee: Marco Antonio Rodríguez

March 18, 2012 Round 11	Toluca	1 – 1	Monterrey	Estadio Nemesio Díez, Toluca
12:00	Alonso 31' (pen.); Torres (yellow card) 60'; Dueñas (yellow card) 74'	Report	Reyna (yellow card) 25'; Morales (yellow card) 30'; Delgado (yellow card) 36'; Basanta (yellow card) 62'; Cardozo 78'	Referee: José Alfredo Peñaloza

March 24, 2012 Round 12	Monterrey	4 – 0	Estudiantes Tecos	Estadio Tecnológico, Monterrey
17:00	Suazo 1'; Delgado 14'; Reyna 65' (pen.) de Nigris 68'	Report	Leaño (yellow card) 22'; Bareiro (yellow card) 29'	Referee: Ricardo Arellano

April 1, 2012 Round 13	América	2 – 3	Monterrey	Estadio Azteca, Mexico City
16:00	Montenegro (yellow card) 7'; Molina (yellow card) 11'; Benítez 20', 59'; Cárdenas (yellow card) 41'; García (yellow card) 90+7'	Report	Zavala (yellow card) 18'; L. Pérez (yellow card) 30'; Suazo 47'; Carreño 85'; Reyna 90+5'	Referee: Francisco Chacón

April 7, 2012 Round 14	Monterrey	2 – 0	UANL	Estadio Tecnológico, Monterrey
19:00	Zavala (yellow card) 30' de Nigris 42', 54', (yellow card) 43'; L. Pérez (yellow card) 67'	Report	Lobos (yellow card) 14'; Torres Nilo (yellow card) 39'; Toledo (yellow card) 40'; Jiménez (yellow card) 52'; Salcido (yellow card) 55'; Acosta (yellow card) 75'	Referee: Mauricio Morales

April 14, 2012 Round 15	Atlas	1 – 0	Monterrey	Estadio Jalisco, Guadalajara
20:45	Rodríguez 37'; Santos (yellow card) 41'	Report	Arce (yellow card) 8'; Meza (yellow card) 31'	Referee: Roberto García Orozco

April 21, 2012 Round 16	Monterrey	1 – 1	Pachuca	Estadio Tecnológico, Monterrey
21:00	Basanta (yellow card) 58'; Suazo 90+4'	Report	Arreola 15', (yellow card) 73'; Cejas (yellow card) 39'; Rojas (yellow card) 70'; Franco (yellow card) 84'	Referee: Jorge Isaac Rojas

April 28, 2012 Round 17	Atlante	0 – 3	Monterrey	Estadio Andrés Quintana Roo, Cancún
21:00	Venegas (yellow card) 53'; Luna (yellow card) 60'; Guerrero (yellow card) 84'; Martínez (yellow card) 84'	Report	Carreño 1'; Suazo 56', 76'; Ayoví (yellow card) 71'	Referee: Miguel Ángel Chacón

=== Final phase ===
May 2, 2012 Quarter-finals	Tijuana	1 – 2	Monterrey	Estadio Caliente, Tijuana
20:30	Gandolfi (yellow card) 4'; Fernández (yellow card) 57'; Arce (yellow card) 65'; Ruiz (yellow card) 72' (yellow-red card) 79'; Enriquez 88'	Report	Meza (yellow card) 25'; Zavala 30', (yellow card) 38'; Reyna 49' de Nigris (yellow card) 64'	Referee: Jorge Antonio Pérez

May 5, 2012 Quarter-finals	Monterrey	2 – 2	Tijuana	Estadio Tecnológico, Monterrey
20:00	Reyna (yellow card) 27' (yellow-red card) 32'; Delgado 45+'; Basanta (yellow card) 60', (goal) 65'; Zavala (yellow card) 71'; Meza (yellow card) 81'	Report	Arévalo Ríos 9', 61' (pen.); Maya (yellow card) 19'; Corona (yellow card) 35'; Castillo (yellow card) 43'; Almazán (red card) 50'; Gandolfi (yellow card) 50'; Arce (yellow card) 52'; Pulido (red card) 72'	Referee: Ricardo Arellano

Monterrey advanced 4–3 on aggregate

May 9, 2012 Semi-finals	América	0 – 0	Monterrey	Estadio Azteca, Mexico City
21:00	Vuoso (yellow card) 33'; Aguilar (yellow card) 42' (yellow-red card) 83'; Molina (yellow card) 71'; Mosquera (yellow card) 77'	Report	Chávez (yellow card) 36'; Basanta (yellow card) 45+'; Mier (yellow card) 86'	Referee: Mauricio Morales

May 12, 2012 Semi-finals	Monterrey	2 – 0	América	Estadio Tecnológico, Monterrey
21:00	Basanta 9', (yellow card) 55' de Nigris 52'	Report	Molina (yellow card) 29'; Vuoso (yellow card) 67'; Mosquera (yellow card) 75'	Referee: Roberto García Orozco

Monterrey advanced 2–0 on aggregate

May 17, 2012 Final	Monterrey	1 – 1	Santos Laguna	Estadio Tecnológico, Monterrey
21:00	Suazo 90+3'	Report	Quintero (yellow card) 19'; Ludueña (yellow card) 52'; Baloy (yellow card) 59'; Crosas (yellow card) 60'; Peralta 69'; Estrada (yellow card) 75'; Sánchez (yellow card) 86'	Referee: Mauricio Morales

May 20, 2012 Final	Santos Laguna	2 – 1	Monterrey	Estadio TSM Corona, Torreón
20:00	Ludueña 6'; Peralta 64'; Quintero (yellow card) 88'	Report	de Nigris (yellow card) 20', (goal) 78'; Suazo (yellow card) 35'	Referee: Roberto García Orozco

Santos Laguna won 3–2 on aggregate

=== Goalscorers ===
==== Regular season ====
Position	Nation	Name	Goals scored
1.	(Mexico)	Aldo de Nigris	9
2.	(Chile)	Humberto Suazo	7
3.	(Argentina)	César Delgado	3
3.	(Mexico)	Ángel Reyna	3
5.	(Ecuador)	Walter Ayoví	2
5.	(Mexico)	Darío Carreño	2
7.	(Mexico)	Othoniel Arce	1
7.	(Argentina)	José María Basanta	1
7.	(Argentina)	Neri Cardozo	1
7.	(Mexico)	Dárvin Chávez	1
7.	(Mexico)	Luis Ernesto Pérez	1
7.	(Mexico)	Jesús Zavala	1
TOTAL			32

==== Final phase ====
Position	Nation	Name	Goals scored
1.	(Argentina)	José María Basanta	2
1.	(Mexico)	Aldo de Nigris	2
3.	(Argentina)	César Delgado	1
3.	(Mexico)	Ángel Reyna	1
3.	(Chile)	Humberto Suazo	1
3.	(Mexico)	Jesús Zavala	1
TOTAL			8

=== Results ===
==== Results summary ====
Overall								Home						Away					
Pld	W	D	L	GF	GA	GD	Pts	W	D	L	GF	GA	GD	W	D	L	GF	GA	GD
17	9	5	3	32	15	+17	32	7	2	0	21	5	+16	2	3	3	11	10	+1

Last updated: 28 April 2012.
Source: Clausura 2012 results

==== Results by round ====
Round	1	2	3	4	5	6	7	8	9	10	11	12	13	14	15	16	17
Ground	H	A	H	A	H	H	A	H	A	H	A	H	A	H	A	H	A
Result	W	L	D	D	W	W	D	W	L	W	D	W	W	W	L	D	W
Position	3	11	10	11	7	4	5	3	6	5	5	4	4	2	4	5	2

Updated to match(es) played on 29 April 2012. Source: Clausura 2012 results and mediotiempo.com
A = Away; H = Home; W = Win; D = Draw; L = Loss

== CONCACAF Champions League ==
=== Group standings ===
Team	Pld	W	D	L	GF	GA	GD	Pts
(Mexico) Monterrey	6	4	0	2	11	4	+7	12
(United States) Seattle Sounders FC	6	3	1	2	10	7	+3	10
(Guatemala) Comunicaciones	6	2	1	3	8	13	−5	7
(Costa Rica) Herediano	6	2	0	4	6	11	−5	6

=== Group stage ===
August 17, 2011 Group 1	Herediano (Costa Rica)	0 – 5	(Mexico) Monterrey	Estadio Nacional de Costa Rica, San José
20:00		Report	Carreño 21', 22', 35'; Corona 36' de Nigris 56'	Attendance: 8,959; Referee: Marlon Mejía (El Salvador)

August 23, 2011 Group 2	Monterrey (Mexico)	0 – 1	(United States) Seattle Sounders FC	Estadio Tecnológico, Monterrey
20:00		Report	Fernández 38'	Referee: Elmar Rodas (Guatemala)

September 14, 2011 Group 3	Comunicaciones (Guatemala)	1 – 0	(Mexico) Monterrey	Estadio Cementos Progreso, Guatemala City
22:00	Ramírez 45'	Report		Attendance: 3,552; Referee: Joel Aguilar (El Salvador)

September 20, 2011 Group 4	Monterrey (Mexico)	3 – 1	(Guatemala) Comunicaciones	Estadio Tecnológico, Monterrey
20:00	Santana 32'; Pérez 68' (pen.); Suazo 86'	Report	Mejía 83'	Attendance: 10,578; Referee: Jair Marrufo (United States)

September 27, 2011 Group 5	Monterrey (Mexico)	1 – 0	(Costa Rica) Herediano	Estadio Tecnológico, Monterrey
22:00	de Nigris 30'	Report		Attendance: 12,445; Referee: Elmer Bonilla (El Salvador)

October 18, 2011 Group 6	Seattle Sounders FC (United States)	1 – 2	(Mexico) Monterrey	CenturyLink Field, Seattle
22:00	Montero 42'	Report	Carreño 3'; Delgado 60'	Attendance: 15,866; Referee: Enrico Wijngaarde (Suriname)

=== Quarter-finals ===
March 6, 2012 Quarter-final	Morelia (Mexico)	1 – 3	(Mexico) Monterrey	Estadio Morelos, Morelia
22:00	Huiqui 60'	Report	Suazo 28', 44'; Carreño 90+1'	Attendance: 14,951; Referee: Francisco Chacón (Mexico)

March 13, 2012 Quarter-final	Monterrey (Mexico)	4 – 1	(Mexico) Morelia	Estadio Tecnológico, Monterrey
22:00	Suazo 44' (pen.), 71'; Pérez 61' (pen.); Ayoví 83'	Report	Sepúlveda 78' (pen.)	Attendance: 33,000; Referee: Roberto García (Mexico)

Monterrey won 7–2 on aggregate.

=== Semifinals ===
March 28, 2012 Semifinal	Monterrey (Mexico)	3 – 0	(Mexico) UNAM	Estadio Tecnológico, Monterrey
22:00	Morales 7' de Nigris 60', 72'	Report		Attendance: 26,716; Referee: José Alfredo Peñaloza (Mexico)

April 4, 2012 Semifinal	UNAM (Mexico)	1 – 1	(Mexico) Monterrey	Estadio Olímpico Universitario, Mexico City
22:00	García 71'	Report	Reyna 35'	Attendance: 7,300; Referee: Mauricio Morales (Mexico)

Monterrey won 4–1 on aggregate.

=== Final ===
April 25, 2012 Final	Monterrey (Mexico)	2 – 0	(Mexico) Santos Laguna	Estadio Tecnológico, Monterrey
22:00	Suazo 60', 86'	Report		Attendance: 29,300; Referee: Francisco Chacón (Mexico)

April 18, 2012 Final	Santos Laguna (Mexico)	2 – 1	(Mexico) Monterrey	Estadio Corona, Torreón
22:00	Ludueña 45+3'; Peralta 51'	Report	Cardozo 82'	Attendance: 28,000; Referee: Roberto García (Mexico)

Monterrey won 3–2 on aggregate

Monterrey won second title in history

=== Goalscorers ===
Position	Nation	Name	Goals scored
1.	(Mexico)	Darío Carreño	5
1.	(Chile)	Humberto Suazo	5
3.	(Mexico)	Aldo de Nigris	4
4.	(Mexico)	Luis Ernesto Pérez	2
5.	(Ecuador)	Walter Ayoví	1
5.	(Mexico)	Jesús Manuel Corona	1
5.	(Argentina)	César Delgado	1
5.	(Mexico)	Héctor Morales	1
5.	(Mexico)	Ángel Reyna	1
5.	(Mexico)	Sergio Santana	1
TOTAL			22

== FIFA Club World Cup ==
Monterrey participated in the 2011 FIFA Club World Cup in Japan as the winner of the 2010–11 CONCACAF Champions League from 8 to 18 December 2011. Monterrey began their participation on December 11, 2011, against Kashiwa Reysol, team that defeated Auckland City in the preliminary round.

=== Squad ===
Note: Flags indicate national team as defined under FIFA eligibility rules; some limited exceptions apply. Players may hold more than one non-FIFA nationality.

No.	Pos.	Nation	Player
1	GK	MEX	Jonathan Orozco
2	DF	MEX	Severo Meza
4	DF	MEX	Ricardo Osorio
5	DF	MEX	Dárvin Chávez
6	DF	MEX	Héctor Morales
7	MF	MEX	Jesús Manuel Corona
8	MF	MEX	Luis Ernesto Pérez (Captain)
9	FW	MEX	Aldo de Nigris
11	FW	MEX	Sergio Santana
12	GK	MEX	Jesús Dautt
13	FW	MEX	Abraham Darío Carreño
14	MF	MEX	César de la Peña

No.	Pos.	Nation	Player
15	DF	ARG	José María Basanta
16	MF	MEX	Luis Madrigal
17	MF	MEX	Jesús Zavala
18	MF	ARG	Neri Cardozo
19	FW	ARG	César Delgado
20	MF	ECU	Walter Ayoví
21	DF	MEX	Hiram Mier
22	FW	MEX	Marcelo Cazaubón
23	GK	MEX	Juan de Dios Ibarra
24	DF	MEX	Sergio Pérez
26	FW	CHI	Humberto Suazo

=== Quarter-finals ===
December 11, 2011 Quarter-finals	Kashiwa Reysol (Japan)	1 – 1 (a.e.t.) (4 – 3 p)	(Mexico) Monterrey	Toyota Stadium, Toyota
19:30	Leandro Domingues 53'	Report	Suazo 58'	Attendance: 27,525; Referee: Peter O'Leary (New Zealand)
	Penalties
	Leandro Domingues (penalty scored); Jorge Wagner (penalty scored); Kurisawa (penalty scored); Tanaka (penalty missed); Hayashi (penalty scored)		(penalty missed) L. Pérez; (penalty scored) Suazo; (penalty scored) Ayoví; (penalty missed) Orozco; (penalty scored) Delgado

=== Match for fifth place ===
December 14, 2011 Match for 5th place	Monterrey (Mexico)	3 – 2	(Tunisia) Espérance	Toyota Stadium, Toyota
16:30	Mier 39' de Nigris 44'; Zavala 47'	Report	N'Djeng 31'; Mouelhi 76' (pen.)	Attendance: 13,639; Referee: Ravshan Irmatov (Uzbekistan)
