= 2010 InterLiga group stage =

The 2010 InterLiga group stage was played on January 2–10, 2010. The top two teams in each group progressed to the 2010 InterLiga Final.

== Group A ==
Team	Pld	W	D	L	GF	GA	GD	Pts
América	3	2	1	0	9	4	+5	7
Estudiantes Tecos	3	1	1	1	6	5	+1	4
Santos Laguna	3	1	0	2	4	5	–1	3
Atlante	3	1	0	2	2	7	–5	3

Kickoffs are given in (UTC-6).

2010-01-02
17:30

Atlante	2 – 1	Estudiantes Tecos
Arreola 10'; Rojas 47'	(Report)	Cejas 29'

Robertson Stadium, Houston, Texas
Referee: Baldomero Toledo (United States)

2010-01-02
20:00

América	3 – 1	Santos Laguna
Esqueda 26'; Montenegro 62'; Cabañas 83' (pen.)	(Report)	Rodríguez 30' (pen.)

Robertson Stadium, Houston, Texas
Referee: Jorge González (United States)

2010-01-05
18:30

Estudiantes Tecos	2 – 0	Santos Laguna
Bareiro 14'; Ruíz 59'	(Report)

Pizza Hut Park, Frisco, Texas
Referee: Paul Ward (Canada)

2010-01-05
21:00

Atlante	0 – 3	América
	(Report)	Cabañas 62', 78'; Sandoval 73'

Pizza Hut Park, Frisco, Texas
Referee: Ricardo Salazar (United States)

2010-01-09
19:30

Santos Laguna	3 – 0	Atlante
Vuoso 51'; Ludueña 55', 62'	(Report)

Home Depot Center, Carson, California
Attendance: 24,000
Referee: Jair Marrufo (United States)

2010-01-09
22:00

América	3 – 3	Estudiantes Tecos
Reyna 7'; Cabañas 11'; Rosinei 17'	(Report)	Alanís 3'; Ruíz 52'; Bareiro 65'

Home Depot Center, Carson, California
Attendance: 24,000
Referee: Terry Vaughn (United States)

== Group B ==
Team	Pld	W	D	L	GF	GA	GD	Pts
Puebla	3	2	0	1	6	3	+3	6
Monterrey	3	1	2	0	3	2	+1	5
Chiapas	3	0	2	1	2	3	-1	2
UANL	3	0	2	1	4	7	-3	2

Kickoffs are given in (UTC-6).

2010-01-03
14:00

Puebla	4 – 1	UANL
González 19', 31'; C. Ruíz 70', 90'	(Report)	Itamar 10'

Pizza Hut Park, Frisco, Texas
Referee: Mark Geiger (United States)

2010-01-03
16:30

Monterrey	0 – 0	Chiapas
	(Report)

Pizza Hut Park, Frisco, Texas
Referee: Alex Prus (United States)

2010-01-06
18:30

Chiapas	0 – 1	Puebla
	(Report)	Olivera 67'

Robertson Stadium, Houston, Texas
Referee: Silviu Petrescu (Canada)

2010-01-06
21:00

UANL	1 – 1	Monterrey
Tahuilán 52'	(Report)	Basanta 90'

Robertson Stadium, Houston, Texas
Referee: Terry Vaughn (United States)

2010-01-10
17:00

UANL	2 – 2	Chiapas
Lobos 6'; Itamar 28'	(Report)	Orozco 33'; Andrade 45'

Home Depot Center, Carson, California
Attendance: 5,500
Referee: Paul Ward (Canada)

2010-01-10
19:00

Monterrey	2 – 1	Puebla
Pérez 32' (pen.); Martínez 90+1'	(Report)	García 5'

Home Depot Center, Carson, California
Attendance: 5,500
Referee: Kevin Stott (United States)
