= Clausura 2009 Primera División de México final phase =

Tournament details
- Dates: 13–31 May 2009
- Teams: 8

Tournament statistics
- Matches played: 14

The Clausura 2009 Primera División de México final phase was played between 13 and 31 May 2009. A total of eight teams competed in the final phase to decide the champions of the Clausura 2009 Primera División de México season.

Both finalists qualified for the 2009–10 CONCACAF Champions League.

== Bracket ==
Quarter-finals
1	Pachuca	3	2	5
12	Jaguares	1	0	1
2	Toluca	0	0	0
7	Ciudad Juárez	1	0	1
3	UNAM	0	3	3
6	UAG	2	0	2
4	Monterrey	1	2	3
5	Puebla	3	2	5

Semi-finals
1	Pachuca	2	2	4
7	Ciudad Juárez	0	3	3
3	UNAM	2	1	3
5	Puebla	1	2	3

Final
1	Pachuca	0	2	2
3	UNAM	1	2	3

== Quarter-finals ==
The quarterfinals are scheduled to be played on May 13, 14, 16, and 17.

Team 1	Agg.	Team 2	1st leg	2nd leg
Pachuca (Mexico)	5–1	(Mexico) Chiapas	3–1	2–0
Toluca (Mexico)	0–1	(Mexico) Ciudad Juárez	0–1	0–0
UNAM (Mexico)	3–2	(Mexico) UAG	0–2	3–0
Monterrey (Mexico)	3–5	(Mexico) Puebla	1–3	2–2

=== First leg ===
2009-05-14
17:00

Chiapas	1 – 3	Pachuca
Cardozo 39'	(Report)	Aguilar 3'; Torres 21'; Mora 87' (o.g.)

Estadio Víctor Manuel Reyna, Tuxtla Gutiérrez, Chiapas
Referee: Erim Ramírez Ulloa (Mexico)

2009-05-14
21:00

Ciudad Juárez	1 – 0	Toluca
Pérez 56' (pen.)	(Report)

Estadio Olímpico Benito Juárez, Ciudad Juárez, Chihuahua
Referee: Ricardo Arellano Nieves (Mexico)

2009-05-13
19:00

UAG	2 – 0	UNAM
Morales 50'; Ruiz 86' (pen.)	(Report)

Estadio Tres de Marzo, Zapopan, Jalisco
Referee: José Alfredo Peñaloza Soto (Mexico)

2009-05-13
21:00

Puebla	3 – 1	Monterrey
Galindo 4' (o.g.); Acosta 6'; Pérez 56'	(Report)	Suazo 48'

Estadio Cuauhtémoc, Puebla, Puebla
Referee: Jaime Herrera Garduño (Mexico)

=== Second leg ===
2009-05-17
18:00

Pachuca	2 – 0	Chiapas
Caballero 45'; Giménez 50'	{Report}

Estadio Hidalgo, Pachuca, Hidalgo
Referee: Armando Archundia Téllez (Mexico)

2009-05-17
12:00

Toluca	0 – 0	Ciudad Juárez
	{Report}

Estadio Nemesio Díez, Toluca, State of Mexico
Referee: Marco Antonio Rodríguez Moreno (Mexico)

2009-05-16
17:00

UNAM	3 – 0	UAG
López 46'; Palencia 85'; Toledo 90'	{Report}

Estadio Olímpico Universitario, Coyoacán, Mexico City
Referee: Mauricio Rafael Morales Ovalle (Mexico)

2009-05-16
19:00

Monterrey	2 – 2	Puebla
Paredes 58'; Carreño 77'	{Report}	Acosta 14'; Rincón 56'

Estadio Tecnológico, Monterrey, Nuevo León
Referee: Roberto García Orozco (Mexico)

== Semi-finals ==
The semifinals are scheduled to be played on May 20, 21, 23, and 24.

Team 1	Agg.	Team 2	1st leg	2nd leg
Pachuca (Mexico)	4–3	(Mexico) Ciudad Juárez	2–0	2–3
UNAM (Mexico)	3–3	(Mexico) Puebla	2–1	1–2

=== First leg ===
2009-05-21
19:00

Ciudad Juárez	0 – 2	Pachuca
	(Report)	Giménez 18'; Montes 85'

Estadio Olímpico Benito Juárez, Ciudad Juárez, Chihuahua
Referee: Paul Enrique Delgadillo Haro (Mexico)

2009-05-20
20:00

Puebla	1 – 2	UNAM
Acosta 12'	(Report)	Bravo 75'; Palacios 90+2'

Estadio Cuauhtémoc, Puebla, Puebla
Referee: Francisco Chacón Gutiérrez (Mexico)

=== Second leg ===
2009-05-24
18:05

Pachuca	2 – 3	Ciudad Juárez
Cárdenas 13'; Pérez 90+1'	{Report}	Santibáñez 42'; Conde 61'; Maggiolo 81'

Estadio Hidalgo, Pachuca, Hidalgo
Referee: Armando Archundia Téllez (Mexico)

2009-05-23
17:00

UNAM	1 – 2	Puebla
Verón 89'	(Report)	Pérez 3' (pen.); Osorno 29'

Estadio Olímpico Universitario, Coyoacán, Mexico City
Referee: Marco Antonio Rodríguez Moreno (Mexico)

UNAM tied 3–3 on aggregate and advance as the higher seeded team.

== Final ==
=== Summary ===
The first leg was played on 28 May, and the second leg was played on 31 May 2023.

Team 1	Agg.	Team 2	1st leg	2nd leg
UNAM	3–2	Pachuca	1–0	2–2

28 May 2009
21:05

UNAM	1–0	Pachuca
López 21'

Estadio Olímpico Universitario, Mexico City
Attendance: 62,000
Referee: Francisco Chacón (Guanajuato)
31 May 2009
19:05

Pachuca	2–2 (a.e.t.)	UNAM
Giménez 32' (pen.), 78'		López 62'; Barrera 108'

Estadio Hidalgo, Pachuca
Attendance: 30,000
Referee: Paul Delgadillo (Jalisco)
