= Jesús Manuel Corona =

Mexican footballer (born 1993)

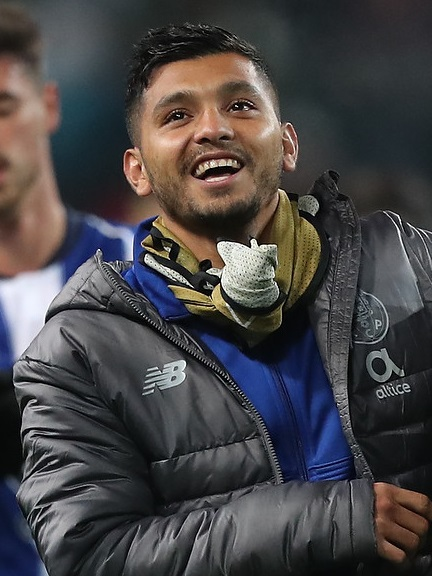
- Corona with Porto in 2018

Personal information
- Full name: Jesús Manuel Corona Ruíz
- Date of birth: 6 January 1993 (age 33)
- Place of birth: Hermosillo, Sonora, Mexico
- Height: 1.74 m (5 ft 9 in)
- Position: Winger

Team information
- Current team: Monterrey
- Number: 17

Youth career
- 2008–2010: Monterrey

Senior career*
Years	Team	Apps	(Gls)
2010–2013	Monterrey	37	(2)
2013–2015	Twente	46	(11)
2013–2014	Jong Twente	5	(2)
2015–2022	Porto	192	(23)
2022–2023	Sevilla	24	(3)
2023–	Monterrey	104	(8)

International career^{‡}
2011–2013	Mexico U20	15	(5)
2014–	Mexico	73	(11)
Medal record
Men's football
Representing Mexico
CONCACAF Gold Cup
Winner	2015 United States
Runner-up	2021 United States
CONCACAF Nations League
Runner-up	2021 United States
CONCACAF U-20 Championship
Winner	2013 Mexico	Team
- * Club domestic league appearances and goals as of 21 November 2026 ‡ National team caps and goals as of 17 November 2026

Jesús Manuel "Tecatito" Corona Ruíz (Latin American Spanish: [xesusmaˈnwel koˈɾona ˈrwis]; born 6 January 1993) is a Mexican professional footballer who plays as a winger for Liga MX club Monterrey and the Mexico national team.

Tecatito began his professional career with Monterrey before moving abroad to play for Twente. He later joined Porto, where he made 287 appearances and won three Primeira Liga titles over seven seasons. After a short spell with Sevilla, he returned to his boyhood club, Monterrey.

A full international since 2014, Tecatito was part of the national squad that won the 2015 CONCACAF Gold Cup. He has also represented his country at the 2018 FIFA World Cup, the 2021 Gold Cup, and at two Copa América tournaments.

== Club career ==
=== Monterrey ===
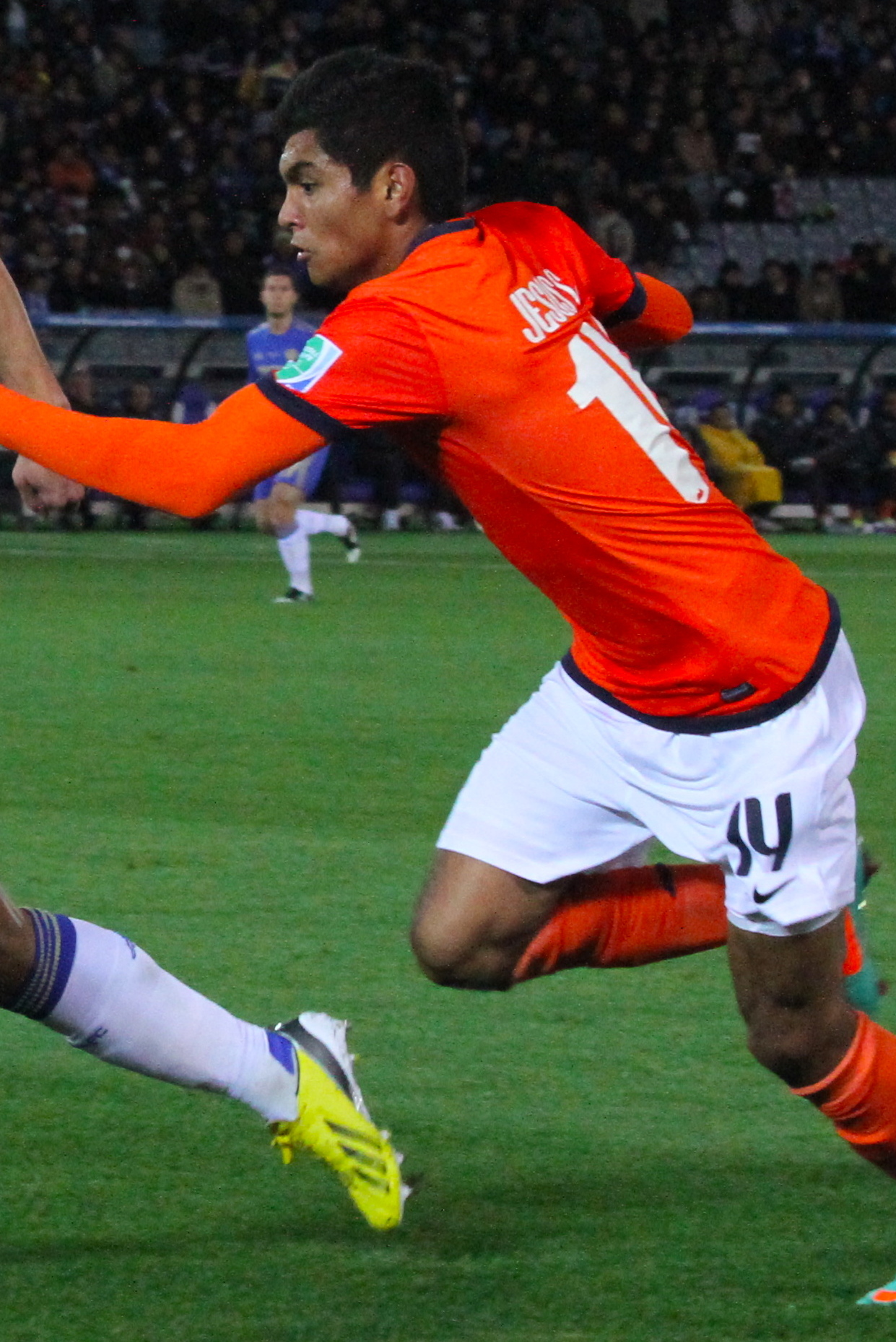
Corona playing for Monterrey at the 2012 FIFA Club World Cup

Born to a lower-middle-class family in Hermosillo, Sonora, Corona began playing football at the age of 6 for various local youth teams. At the age of 15, he was scouted by a number of clubs, including Brazilian side Santos FC. However, due to his family's reluctance to see him move abroad at such a young age, Corona eventually began his professional career by joining C.F. Monterrey.

Corona made his senior team debut at 17 years old, under coach Víctor Manuel Vucetich, on 7 August 2010 as a starter in an away league match against Atlante in a 2–1 victory for Monterrey. He scored his first goal for Monterrey on 7 October 2011 in an away match against Tecos, with the game ending in a 3–2 victory for Monterrey. Corona also scored his first goal for Monterrey in their presentation at the 2012 FIFA Club World Cup against Ulsan Hyundai of South Korea on 9 December, with an assist from Aldo de Nigris in the 3–1 victory. In the match for third place against Al Ahly on 16 December, Corona scored in the third minute of the match, which ended in a 2–0 victory.

=== Twente ===
On 22 August 2013, Corona's transfer to Dutch side F.C. Twente was announced, for whom he signed a four-year contract. He started the 2014 season with Twente's reserve team, which plays in the Second Division, scoring 2 goals on 18 August. On 13 September 2014, Corona returned from injury and a stint with the reserve team to start his first game with Twente in the 2014–15 season and went on to record an assist and a goal against Go Ahead Eagles in a 2–1 victory for Twente, the club's first victory of the 2014–15 season. He finished his second season with the senior team with a career-best season haul of 9 goals.

=== Porto ===
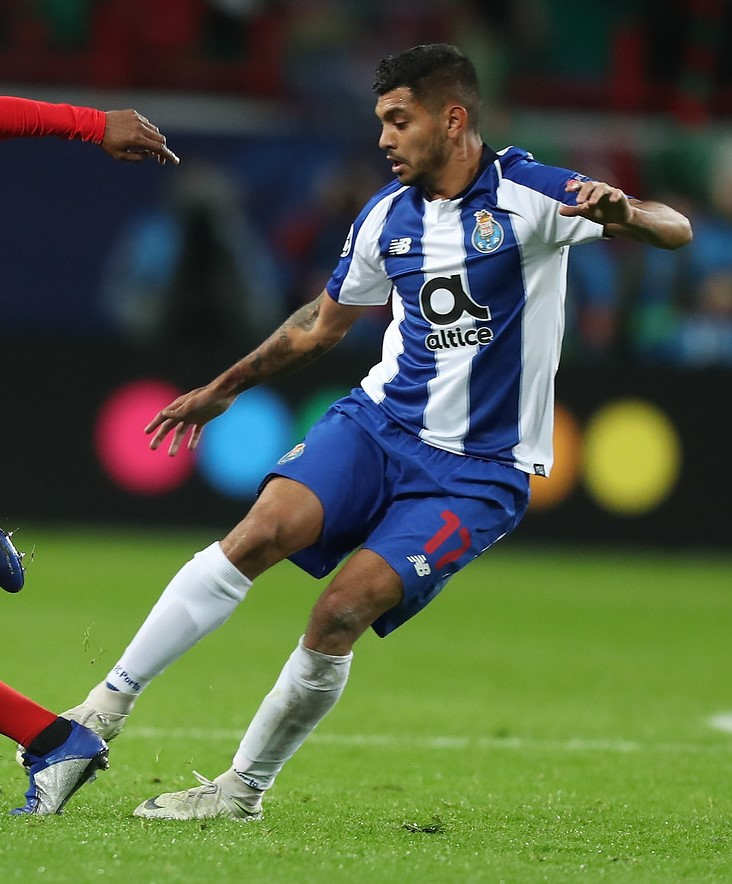
Corona playing with Porto in 2018

On 31 August 2015, Twente announced the transfer of Corona to Portuguese club Porto on a four-year deal for €10.5 million, with a €50 million buy-out clause.

On 12 September, Corona scored two goals on his Primeira Liga debut in the 3–1 victory over FC Arouca. On 25 September, Corona scored his third goal playing against Moreirense giving Porto the 2–1 lead, the match resulted in 2–2 draw. On 4 October, Corona scored Porto's first goal against Belenenses in a match that ended in a 4–0 win over the Lisbon team.

On 24 October 2018, Corona scored a goal and assisted another in Porto's 3–1 win over Lokomotiv Moscow in their Champions League group stage match. On 28 November 2018, in a Champions League group stage match against German club Schalke 04, Corona scored in a 3–1 victory, becoming the first Mexican to score in three consecutive Champions League matches. In March 2019, Corona signed a contract extension with Porto, keeping him at the club until 2022.

On 10 January 2020, in a league match against Moreirense, he scored from a volley in Porto's 4–2 victory. The goal was subsequently named Goal of the Month. At the end of the 2019–20 season, after a first-place finish and contributing a career-best 11 assists (2nd place for most of the season), Corona was named the best player of the Primeira Liga, and was included in the Best XI. He also won the club's Dragão de Ouro Award, which is awarded to the best player of the season.

Following a 1–1 draw against archrivals Benfica on 15 January 2021, Corona, in his 246th overall display, moved up to fourth in Porto's all-time list of foreign players with the most appearances, as well as becoming the Mexican with the most appearances in Portugal, surpassing former teammate Héctor Herrera.

=== Sevilla ===
On 13 January 2022, Corona joined La Liga side Sevilla on a three-and-a-half-year deal. On 21 April, Corona scored his first goals with Sevilla, scoring twice in a 3–2 victory against Levante UD. On 18 August 2022, he suffered a major injury in training. Corona underwent surgery and was out of action for the rest of the year.

Corona returned to the playing field on 14 May 2023, coming on as a substitute against Real Valladolid in a 3–0 victory.

=== Return to Monterrey ===
On 1 September 2023, Corona returned to his boyhood club, Monterrey.

== International career ==
=== Youth ===
Corona began his national team career with the under-20 side, participating in the 2011 and 2012 editions of the Milk Cup. Mexico won the 2012 final against Denmark, with Corona being named as the competition's best player.

Corona was called up by coach Sergio Almaguer to participate in the 2013 CONCACAF U-20 Championship hosted in Mexico. He played four out of five matches and scored three goals. In the final against the United States, Corona scored in the fourth minute of the match, and helped Mexico win the championship. He was a squad member at the 2013 FIFA U-20 World Cup hosted in Turkey. Corona was again selected by Almaguer, this time to participate in the 2013 Toulon Tournament.

=== Senior ===
In 2014, Corona was called up by Miguel Herrera to play with the senior national team in their November friendlies against the Netherlands and Belarus. On 12 November, he made his debut against the Dutch, coming on in the 61st minute and providing the assist for Carlos Vela's second goal in the 3–2 victory for El Tri at the Amsterdam Arena.

Corona was a member of Mexico's 2015 CONCACAF Gold Cup winning squad, scoring his first competitive international goal in the 3–1 win over Jamaica in the Final. He also received the Bright Future award. He was also included in the 2015 Copa América roster. In Mexico's first group stage match against Bolivia, which ended in a scoreless draw, Corona's performance earned him the Man of the Match award.

The following year, now under coach Juan Carlos Osorio, Corona earned a call-up to the Copa América Centenario. In the final group stage match against Venezuela, he replaced the injured Javier Aquino in the 18th minute and scored in the 80th minute in an eventual 1–1 draw. The result earned Mexico a first-place finish in Group C, and Corona's goal was subsequently named CONCACAF Goal of the Year.

In May 2018, Corona was named in Mexico's preliminary 28-man squad for the World Cup, and in June, was subsequently named in the final 23-man roster. He appeared as a substitute in the group stage matches against South Korea and Sweden.

In October 2022, Corona was named in Mexico's preliminary 31-man squad by manager Gerardo Martino for the World Cup, but did not make the final 26 due to an ankle injury.

In November 2026, Corona was called up by manager Rafael Marquez for the CONCACAF Nations League. He played in both legs against Jamaica, scoring in the latter match.

== Style of play ==
Corona is considered a quick winger, capable of playing either flank and dribbling past defenders. He is comfortable playing with either foot, managing to develop the ability from a young age.

Under Porto manager Sérgio Conceição, Corona has been utilized at times as a full-back.

Corona has cited Cuauhtémoc Blanco as someone he idolized while growing up.

== Personal life ==
Corona was given the nickname Tecatito during his early years at Monterrey. The name is a reference to the beer brand Tecate, which was owned by club sponsor Cuauhtémoc Moctezuma Brewery, a competitor to the Corona beer brand that matches his surname. As a sponsor, the logo of another of its subsidiaries, Carta Blanca, was on the kits. During Monterrey's participation at the 2012 FIFA Club World Cup, with Carta Blanca as the sole kit sponsor, the name 'Corona' was not displayed, but instead 'Jesús C.' was printed on the kit.

Corona was naturalised as a Portuguese citizen in August 2021, allowing him to play freely for any team in the European Union.

== Career statistics ==
=== Club ===
As of match played on 21 November 2026

Appearances and goals by club, season and competition
Club	Season	League			National cup (Note: Includes KNVB Cup, Taça de Portugal, Copa del Rey)		League cup (Note: Includes Taça da Liga)		Continental		Other		Total	
Club	Season	Division	Apps	Goals	Apps	Goals	Apps	Goals	Apps	Goals	Apps	Goals	Apps	Goals
Monterrey	2010–11	Mexican Primera División	1	0	—		—		2 (Note: Appearance(s) in CONCACAF Champions League/Cup)	0	—		3	0
Monterrey	2011–12	Mexican Primera División	10	1	—		—		3	1	—		13	2
Monterrey	2012–13	Liga MX	26	1	—		—		9	2	3 (Note: Appearances in FIFA Club World Cup)	2	38	5
Monterrey	Total		37	2	—		—		14	3	3	2	54	7
Twente	2013–14	Eredivisie	15	2	1	0	—		—		—		16	2
Twente	2014–15	Eredivisie	27	9	4	2	—		—		—		31	11
Twente	2015–16	Eredivisie	4	0	—		—		—		—		4	0
Twente	Total		46	11	5	2	—		—		—		51	13
Porto	2015–16	Primeira Liga	28	8	1	0	2	0	4 (Note: Appearances in UEFA Champions League)	0	—		35	8
Porto	2016–17	Primeira Liga	29	3	1	1	2	0	9	2	—		41	6
Porto	2017–18	Primeira Liga	27	3	3	0	3	0	8	0	—		41	3
Porto	2018–19	Primeira Liga	34	3	5	0	4	0	8	3	1 (Note: Appearance in Supertaça Cândido de Oliveira)	1	52	7
Porto	2019–20	Primeira Liga	33	4	5	0	4	0	9 (Note: Two appearances in UEFA Champions League, seven appearances in UEFA Europa League)	0	—		51	4
Porto	2020–21	Primeira Liga	30	2	4	1	2	0	10	0	1	0	47	3
Porto	2021–22	Primeira Liga	11	0	1	0	2	0	4	0	—		18	0
Porto	Total		192	23	20	2	19	0	52	5	2	1	285	31
Sevilla	2021–22	La Liga	18	2	1	0	—		3 (Note: Appearances in UEFA Europa League)	0	—		22	2
Sevilla	2022–23	La Liga	4	1	—		—		—		—		4	1
Sevilla	2023–24	La Liga	2	0	—		—		—		—		2	0
Sevilla	Total		24	3	1	0	—		3	0	—		28	3
Monterrey	2023–24	Liga MX	24	0	—		—		3	1	—		27	1
Monterrey	2024–25	Liga MX	35	2	—		—		1	0	2 (Note: Appearances in Leagues Cup)	1	38	3
Monterrey	2025–26	Liga MX	31	4	—		—		4	1	5 (Note: Two appearances in Leagues Cup, three appearances and one goal in FIFA Club World Cup)	1	40	6
Monterrey	2026–27	Liga MX	14	2	—		—		—		6	0	20	2
Monterrey	Total		104	8	—		—		8	2	13	2	125	12
Career total			403	47	26	4	19	0	77	10	18	5	543	66

=== International ===
As of match played on 17 November 2026

Appearances and goals by national team and year
National team	Year	Apps	Goals
Mexico	2014	2	0
Mexico	2015	16	3
Mexico	2016	8	3
Mexico	2017	6	1
Mexico	2018	8	0
Mexico	2019	2	0
Mexico	2020	3	1
Mexico	2021	18	2
Mexico	2022	8	0
Mexico	2023	0	0
Mexico	2024	0	0
Mexico	2025	0	0
Mexico	2026	2	1
Total		73	11

Scores and results list Mexico's goal tally first, score column indicates score after each Corona goal.

List of international goals scored by Jesús Manuel Corona
No.	Date	Venue	Opponent	Score	Result	Competition
1	30 May 2015	Estadio Víctor Manuel Reyna, Tuxtla Gutiérrez, Mexico	Guatemala	3–0	3–0	Friendly
2	26 July 2015	Lincoln Financial Field, Philadelphia, United States	Jamaica	2–0	3–1	2015 CONCACAF Gold Cup Final
3	17 November 2015	Estadio Olímpico Metropolitano, San Pedro Sula, Honduras	Honduras	1–0	2–0	2018 FIFA World Cup qualification
4	25 March 2016	BC Place, Vancouver, Canada	Canada	3–0	3–0	2018 FIFA World Cup qualification
5	29 March 2016	Estadio Azteca, Mexico City, Mexico	Canada	2–0	2–0	2018 FIFA World Cup qualification
6	13 June 2016	NRG Stadium, Houston, United States	Venezuela	1–1	1–1	Copa América Centenario
7	1 June 2017	MetLife Stadium, East Rutherford, United States	Republic of Ireland	1–0	3–1	Friendly
8	13 October 2020	Cars Jeans Stadion, The Hague, Netherlands	Algeria	1–0	2–2	Friendly
9	6 June 2021	Empower Field at Mile High, Denver, United States	United States	1–0	2–3 (a.e.t.)	2021 CONCACAF Nations League Final
10	8 September 2021	Estadio Rommel Fernández, Panama City, Panama	Panama	1–1	1–1	2022 FIFA World Cup qualification
11	17 November 2026	Estadio BBVA, Guadalupe, Mexico	Jamaica	1–0	1–0	2026–27 CONCACAF Nations League A

== Honours ==
Monterrey

- Mexican Primera División: Apertura 2010
- CONCACAF Champions League: 2010–11, 2011–12, 2012–13

Porto

- Primeira Liga: 2017–18, 2019–20, 2021–22
- Taça de Portugal: 2019–20, 2021–22
- Supertaça Cândido de Oliveira: 2018, 2020

Sevilla

- UEFA Europa League: 2022–23

Mexico U20

- CONCACAF U-20 Championship: 2013
- Milk Cup: 2012

Mexico

- CONCACAF Gold Cup: 2015
- CONCACAF Cup: 2015

Individual

- Milk Cup Best Player: 2012
- CONCACAF Gold Cup Best Young Player: 2015
- CONCACAF Best XI: 2015, 2021
- CONCACAF Goal of the Year: 2016
- Primeira Liga Goal of the Month: January 2020
- LPFP Primeira Liga Player of the Year: 2019–20
- Primeira Liga Team of the Year: 2019–20
- FC Porto Player of the Year: 2019–20
