= Marcelo Cazaubón =

Mexican footballer (born 1992)

Personal information
- Full name: Marcelo Cazaubón Rincón
- Date of birth: 15 April 1992 (age 34)
- Place of birth: Tampico, Tamaulipas, Mexico
- Height: 1.82 m (6 ft 0 in)
- Position: Forward

Team information
- Current team: Merida Fc
- Number: 14

Senior career*
Years	Team	Apps	(Gls)
2009–2011	Monterrey	4	(0)
2012–2013	→ Correcaminos (loan)	21	(4)
2013–2014	→ Venados (loan)	16	(3)
- * Club domestic league appearances and goals

Marcelo Cazaubón Rincón (born 15 April 1992) is a Mexican former footballer.

== Club career ==
=== CF Monterrey ===
He has played only in first division with the Monterrey first team. He was part of the team in 2011 Club World Cup at Japan. He made his senior team debut on August 13, 2011, as a substitute in a match against San Luis in a 1 - 0 loss of Monterrey He was sent in loan to Correcaminos from Cd. Victoria in 2012–2013, where he fought the Copa Mx final vs Dorados. He played 21 games in Correcaminos. In 2013, he was sent to Venados at Merida, he played 16 games.
