= Pablo Aja =

Mexican footballer (born 1986)

Personal information
- Full name: Pablo Aja Fresnedo
- Date of birth: 28 January 1986 (age 40)
- Place of birth: Puebla, Mexico
- Height: 1.76 m (5 ft 9 in)
- Position: Midfielder

Senior career*
Years	Team	Apps	(Gls)
2007–2011	Puebla	38	(0)
2011	León	0	(0)
2012	Mérida	16	(0)
2012–2014	UAT	29	(0)
2015–2016	Venados	0	(0)
2017	Venados	8	(0)
- * Club domestic league appearances and goals

Pablo Aja Fresnedo (born 28 January 1986) is a Mexican former footballer. He is a product of Puebla's youth system.

== Career ==
Born in Puebla, Mexico, Aja began his career 2006 in his hometown team and made his debut on 4 November 2007 in a 3–0 loss against Chivas. He helped the team return to Primera División (first division) in 2008.
