= Alberto Ramírez (Mexican footballer) =

Mexican footballer (born 1986)

Personal information
- Full name: Alberto Ramírez Torres
- Date of birth: February 1, 1986 (age 40)
- Place of birth: Puerto Vallarta, Mexico
- Height: 1.75 m (5 ft 9 in)
- Position: Midfielder

Senior career*
Years	Team	Apps	(Gls)
2004–2011	Tecos UAG	26	(1)
2009	→ FC Inter (loan)	23	(1)
2011	Indios	2	(0)
2012–2013	OPS	50	(14)
2014	Ballenas Galeana	13	(2)
2014–2015	Atlético Zacatepec	21	(2)
2015–2016	Alebrijes de Oaxaca	6	(0)
2016–2018	AC Kajaani	70	(38)

International career
2003–2005	Mexico Youth	20	(?)
- * Club domestic league appearances and goals as of 31 January 2019

Alberto Ramírez Torres (born February 2, 1986) is a former Mexican footballer, as a midfielder for AC Kajaani. He has also played for the Mexico national team at the youth level.

== Career ==
=== Tecos UAG ===
Ramírez made his competitive debut for Tecos UAG on 8 February 2004, in the club's Primera División; 1–1 draw against Club América. He played six years for Tecos.

=== FC Inter Turku ===
Ramírez joined Inter Turku in April 2009, just a few weeks before the start of the season. He signed for one season with the current Finnish champion after a try-out.

== International career ==
Ramírez was named captain of Mexico U-17 in the 2003 FIFA U-17 World Championship held in Finland. There, he played as a playmaker and took the team to the quarter-finals, where they lost to Argentina. Mexico's coach Humberto Grondona, thought Ramírez was his best player in the competition.

In 2005, he was selected for the under-21 national squad for a tournament in Toulon.
