= Felipe Ayala =

Mexican footballer (born 1977)

Personal information
- Full name: Felipe de Jesús Ayala Armendáriz
- Date of birth: 16 December 1977 (age 48)
- Place of birth: Monterrey, Mexico
- Height: 1.78 m (5 ft 10 in)
- Position: Midfielder

Senior career*
Years	Team	Apps	(Gls)
1995–2002	Tigres UANL	108	(3)
2002–2012	Jaguares de Chiapas	146	(10)
2004–2005	→ Puebla (loan)	28	(0)
2008–2011	→ Puebla (loan)	81	(2)
2011–2012	→ Morelia (loan)	4	(0)
2012–2013	Correcaminos	18	(0)
- * Club domestic league appearances and goals

Felipe de Jesús Ayala Armendáriz (born 16 December 1977) is a Mexican former professional footballer who played as a midfielder. Ayala played for five clubs. The clubs were Tigres de la UANL, Jaguares de Chiapas, Puebla F.C., Monarcas Morelia, and Correcaminos UAT (his retirement club).

== Career ==
=== Tigres de la UANL ===
Felipe de Jesús Ayala Armendárizmade his debut during the 1995-96 in April on Tigres de la UANL against CD Veracruz, in which he won 2–0.

=== Jaguares de Chiapas ===
After retire from Tigres de la UANL in 2002, he went to Jaguares de Chiapas before his retirement in 2012.

=== Puebla F.C. ===
From 2004 to 2005, Felipe played in Puebla F.C. He retired until 2008, where he returned for the club. In March 2010, Felipe made an olympic goal against Team Cruz azul, having a victory for Puebla 4-1 before his retirement in 2011.

=== Monarcas Morelia ===
After his retirement from Puebla in 2011, He went to Monarcas Morelia before another retirement.

=== Correcaminos UAT ===
Correcaminos was the last club where he went after his 2012 retirements from Jaguares de Chiapas and Monarcas Morelia, and before his 2013 retirements.
