= Braulio Luna =

Mexican footballer (born 1974)

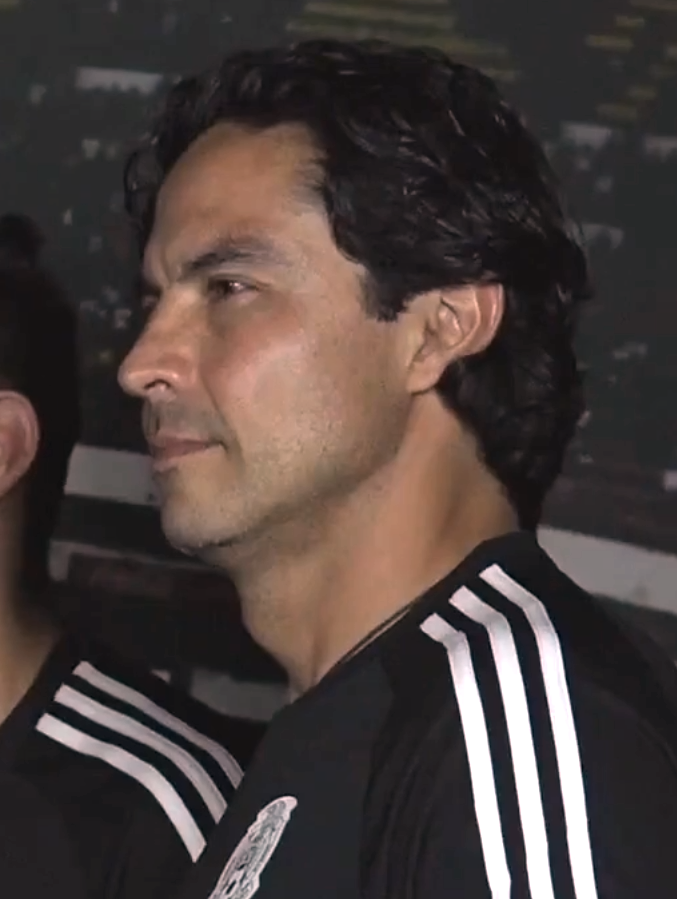
- Luna in 2017

Personal information
- Full name: Braulio Mauricio Luna Guzmán
- Date of birth: 8 September 1974 (age 52)
- Place of birth: Mexico City, Mexico
- Height: 1.80 m (5 ft 11 in)
- Position: Midfielder

Senior career*
Years	Team	Apps	(Gls)
1994–1998	UNAM	108	(10)
1998–2002	América	116	(22)
2002–2004	Necaxa	85	(12)
2004–2006	Veracruz	64	(3)
2007–2010	San Luis	124	(18)
2010–2011	Pachuca	27	(1)
2011–2012	Tecos	30	(2)
2012–2013	Veracruz	29	(5)
2013–2014	Cruz Azul Hidalgo	11	(0)
2014	Atlético San Luis	3	(0)
Total		597	(73)

International career
1997–2010	Mexico	32	(2)
Medal record
Representing Mexico
Winner	CONCACAF Gold Cup	1998
- * Club domestic league appearances and goals

Braulio Mauricio Luna Guzmán (Spanish pronunciation: [ˈbɾawljo ˈluna]; born 8 September 1974) is a Mexican former professional footballer who played as a midfielder.

Luna made his professional debut in the Mexican League Division in 1994, playing for UNAM Pumas in a 3–3 draw against León. He made his international debut for the Mexico national team on 8 December 1997, playing in a match against Australia during the 1997 FIFA Confederations Cup. Luna also played in 1998 and 2002 FIFA World Cups.

== Career statistics ==
=== International goals ===
No.	Date	Venue	Opponent	Score	Result	Competition
1.	14 December 1997	King Fahd II Stadium, Riyadh, Saudi Arabia	Saudi Arabia	4–0	5–0	1997 FIFA Confederations Cup
2.	24 February 2010	Candlestick Park, San Francisco, United States	Bolivia	3–0	5–0	Friendly

== Honours ==
Mexico

- CONCACAF Gold Cup: 1998
- Pan American Games Silver Medal: 1995
- CONCACAF Pre-Olympic Tournament: 1996
