= Alejandro Acosta =

Uruguayan footballer (born 1980)

Personal information
- Full name: Alejandro Javier Acosta Torres
- Date of birth: July 3, 1980 (age 46)
- Place of birth: Montevideo, Uruguay
- Height: 1.90 m (6 ft 3 in)
- Position: Defender

Senior career*
| Years | Team | Apps | (Gls) |
| 1998–2004 | Progreso | ? | (0) |
| 2005 | Cobresal | 3 | (0) |
| 2006 | O'Higgins | 1 | (0) |
| 2007 | Unión Española | 18 | (0) |
| 2008 | Defensor Sporting | 19 | (1) |
| 2008–2011 | Puebla | 68 | (11) |
| 2011 | Veracruz | 14 | (1) |
| 2012 | Dorados | 12 | (1) |
| 2012–2013 | Cerro Largo | 12 | (0) |
| 2013 | Deportivo Petapa | 13 | (0) |
| 2013–2014 | Cerro Largo | 22 | (0) |
| 2014–2015 | Deportivo Carchá | | |
| 2015–2016 | Miramar Misiones | 17 | (1) |
| 2016–2017 | Boston River | 8 | (0) |
| 2017 | Venados | 8 | (0) |
- * Club domestic league appearances and goals

Alejandro Javier Acosta Torres (born July 3, 1980) is a former Uruguayan football player, who last played as a defender for Venados in the Mexican Ascenso MX.

== Career ==
Acosta Started his football career in Chilean side Cobresal in 2005. Later on he was transferred to Chilean club O'Higgins in 2006 where he played 18 games before being transferred to club Unión Española in 2007. He played 17 games before been transferred to Uruguayan club Defensor in 2008 where he scored his first professional goal. That same year he was transferred to Mexican club Puebla FC where he has established himself as an important player in the club, scoring 2 goals in the 2009 playoffs, getting the club in to the semifinals before being knocked out by Pumas.

He joined Veracruz during the 2011 Liga de Ascenso draft that took place on June 9, 2011, in Playa del Carmen.

In August 2012 Acosta signed a new deal with Cerro Largo FC of the Uruguayan Primera División.
