= Roberto Carlos Juárez =

Mexican footballer (born 1984)

Roberto Carlos Juarez
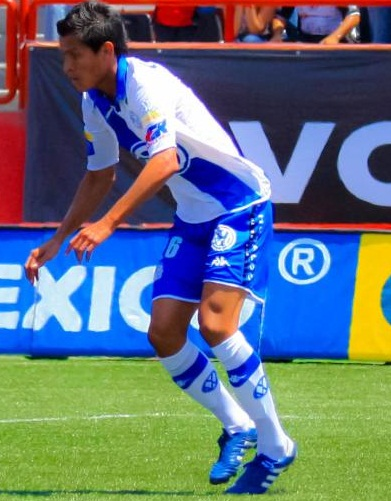

Personal information
- Full name: Roberto Carlos Juárez Gutiérrez
- Date of birth: 4 July 1984 (age 42)
- Place of birth: Guadalajara, Mexico
- Height: 1.83 m (6 ft 0 in)
- Position: Defender

Senior career*
Years	Team	Apps	(Gls)
2007–2009	Cruz Azul	2	(0)
2009–2013	Puebla	109	(4)
2013–2016	Chiapas	3	(0)
2014	→ Querétaro (loan)	3	(0)
2014–2015	→ Lobos BUAP (loan)	15	(0)
2015–2016	→ Puebla (loan)	6	(0)
2016–2017	Puebla	0	(0)
2017	Alianza	12	(0)
2017–2019	Leones Negros UdeG	37	(0)
- * Club domestic league appearances and goals

Roberto Carlos Juárez Gutiérrez (born 4 July 1984) is a Mexican former footballer. He surged out of Cruz Azul's youth squad.

== Career ==
Juárez began his career in 2007 with Cruz Azul. He made his debut on 17 November 2007 in a match against Pachuca.
