= Rafael Medina =

Mexican footballer (born 1979)

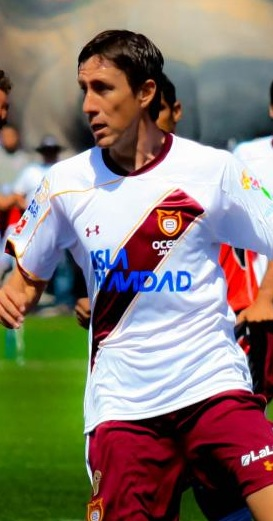
- Medina playing for Tecos

Personal information
- Full name: Rafael Medina Rodríguez
- Date of birth: 8 October 1979 (age 47)
- Place of birth: Guadalajara, Jalisco, Mexico
- Height: 1.76 m (5 ft 9 in)
- Positions: Winger; right-back

Senior career*
| Years | Team | Apps | (Gls) |
| 2001–2002 | La Piedad | 28 | (8) |
| 2002–2005 | Guadalajara | 120 | (10) |
| 2006 | Santos Laguna | 17 | (1) |
| 2006–2011 | Tecos | 147 | (7) |
| 2012–2013 | Veracruz | 31 | (2) |

International career
| 2005 | Mexico | 1 | (0) |
- * Club domestic league appearances and goals

Rafael Medina Rodríguez (born 8 October 1979) is a Mexican former professional footballer.
