= Orlando Rincón =

Mexican footballer (born 1985)

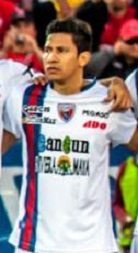

Personal information
- Full name: Orlando Javier Rincón Reyes
- Date of birth: 19 September 1985 (age 41)
- Place of birth: Cuautla, Morelos, Mexico
- Height: 1.73 m (5 ft 8 in)
- Position: Right back

Team information
- Current team: Puebla U-18 (Assistant)

Senior career*
Years	Team	Apps	(Gls)
2007–2012	Puebla	65	(2)
2011	→ Chiapas (loan)	4	(0)
2012	→ Atlante (loan)	4	(0)
2013	→ San Luis (loan)	5	(0)
2013–2014	→ Chiapas (loan)	5	(0)
2015–2018	Lobos BUAP	61	(4)
2018–2019	Potros UAEM	11	(0)

Managerial career
- 2020–2021: Puebla (women) (Assistant)
- 2021–: Puebla Reserves and Academy
- * Club domestic league appearances and goals as of 14:08, 22 July 2019 (UTC)

Orlando Javier Rincón Reyes (Note: In this Spanish name, the first or paternal surname is Rincón and the second or maternal family name is Reyes.) (born 19 September 1985) is a retired Mexican footballer who most recently played for Potros UAEM.
