= Nicolás Olivera (footballer, born 1978) =

Uruguayan footballer (born 1978)

Nico Olivera
Personal information
- Full name: Andrés Nicolás Olivera Olivera
- Date of birth: 30 May 1978 (age 48)
- Place of birth: Montevideo, Uruguay
- Height: 1.66 m (5 ft 5 in)
- Position: Forward

Senior career*
Years	Team	Apps	(Gls)
1996–1997	Defensor	44	(16)
1998	Valencia	2	(0)
1998–2002	Sevilla	100	(31)
2002–2003	Valladolid	20	(4)
2003–2004	Córdoba	38	(9)
2004	Defensor	4	(0)
2005	Albacete	4	(0)
2005–2006	Defensor	23	(10)
2006	Necaxa	16	(3)
2007	Atlas	28	(6)
2008–2010	Puebla	63	(10)
2008–2009	→ Veracruz (loan)	29	(14)
2011	América	11	(1)
2011–2016	Defensor	104	(32)
2012	→ Correcaminos (loan)	14	(3)
Total		500	(139)

International career
1997	Uruguay U20	7	(2)
1997–2006	Uruguay	28	(8)
- * Club domestic league appearances and goals

Andrés Nicolás "Nico" Olivera Olivera (born 30 May 1978) is a Uruguayan former professional footballer who played as a forward.

He started and finished his 20-year professional career with Defensor, going on to collect 500 league appearances mainly in the top divisions in Uruguay, Spain and Mexico. This included a spell with Sevilla, for whom he signed in 1998.

Olivera won 28 caps for the Uruguay national team, being part of the squads at the 2002 World Cup as well as the 1997 Confederations Cup.

== Club career ==
After excelling as a youngster at his first professional club, Defensor Sporting Club, Montevideo-born Olivera moved to Spain and signed for Valencia CF, in January 1998. He was rarely used by the Che during his five-month spell, but went on to spend the vast majority of the following seven years in the country, starting off with Sevilla FC with which he achieved two La Liga promotions, in 1999 and 2001, scoring 21 goals in 56 games in those seasons combined; on 19 November 2000, during a Seville derby where his team was reduced to ten men with the score at 1–1 and 15 minutes remaining, he netted twice for the eventual 3–1 win.

In 2002, Olivera left Andalusia and joined fellow league side Real Valladolid. After one single season he returned to Segunda División and signed with Córdoba CF, returning to Defensor afterwards.

Olivera then played five months with another Spanish team Albacete Balompié (only four games, top division relegation), returning subsequently to his previous club. In 2006 the 28-year-old moved to Mexico, going on to represent five sides in the country, including Puebla F.C. twice.

On 1 August 2010, in a Primera División match against Club San Luis, Olivera opened the scoring within a few seconds, after knocking in a rebound from Mario Ortiz's speculative shot in an eventual 2–1 home win.

== International career ==
Olivera played all the games for Uruguay at the 1997 FIFA World Youth Championship held in Malaysia, scoring two goals in an eventual second-place finish and being named the competition's best player. Also that year, on 13 December, he made his full side debut, during the FIFA Confederations Cup, against United Arab Emirates, and scored in a 2–0 group stage win.

Olivera was selected for the squad that appeared at the 2002 FIFA World Cup in Japan and South Korea, being an unused squad member.

== Personal life ==
In December 1999, Olivera and compatriot Sevilla teammates Marcelo Zalayeta and Marcelo Otero were charged for assaulting a man. Having struck a plea bargain, they paid €3,600 fines in March 2002 instead of facing a maximum eight-year sentence.

== Career statistics ==
=== International ===
Appearances and goals by national team and year
National team	Year	Apps	Goals
Uruguay	1997	4	2
Uruguay	1998	1	1
Uruguay	1999	2	0
Uruguay	2000	9	3
Uruguay	2001	5	2
Uruguay	2002	4	0
Uruguay	2006	3	0
Total		28	8

Scores and results list Uruguay's goal tally first, score column indicates score after each Olivera goal.

List of international goals scored by Nicolás Olivera
No.	Date	Venue	Opponent	Score	Result	Competition	Ref.
1	13 December 1997	King Fahd International Stadium, Riyadh, Saudi Arabia	United Arab Emirates	1–0	2–0	1997 FIFA Confederations Cup	
2	15 December 1997	King Fahd International Stadium, Riyadh, Saudi Arabia	Czech Republic	1–0	2–1	1997 FIFA Confederations Cup	
3	24 May 1998	Estadio Nacional, Santiago, Chile	Chile	1–2	2–2	Friendly	
4	18 July 2000	Estadio Centenario, Montevideo, Uruguay	Venezuela	1–1	3–1	2002 FIFA World Cup qualification	
5	18 July 2000	Estadio Centenario, Montevideo, Uruguay	Venezuela	3–1	3–1	2002 FIFA World Cup qualification	
6	3 September 2000	Estadio Centenario, Montevideo, Uruguay	Ecuador	3–0	4–0	2002 FIFA World Cup qualification	
7	28 February 2001	Bonifika Stadium, Koper, Slovenia	Slovenia	1–0	2–0	Friendly	
8	7 November 2001	Estadio Olímpico Atahualpa, Quito, Ecuador	Ecuador	1–0	1–1	2002 FIFA World Cup qualification	
