= Juan Carlos García Rulfo =

Mexican footballer (born 1981)

Personal information
- Full name: Juan Carlos García Rulfo Solana
- Date of birth: 17 July 1981 (age 45)
- Place of birth: Guadalajara, Jalisco, Mexico
- Height: 1.77 m (5 ft 9 1/2 in)
- Position: Goalkeeper

Senior career*
Years	Team	Apps	(Gls)
2009–2010	Puebla	2	(0)
2011–2012	Estudiantes Tecos	7	(0)
2012–2013	Correcaminos UAT	0	(0)
- * Club domestic league appearances and goals as of 30 July 2012

Juan Carlos García Rulfo Solana (born July 17, 1981, in Guadalajara, Jalisco) is a Mexican retired footballer who last played for Correcaminos UAT in the Ascenso MX.

== Club career ==
In 2009, he began his career with Puebla FC. He debuted against C.F. Pachuca with a 1–2 victory. He only appeared in two official matches for Puebla in the first division, after spending most of his career in the lower divisions.

Garcia joined Primera División side Estudiantes in January 2011. He made his Primera División debut for Estudiantes, entering as a substitute against Atlante, in February 2011.
