= Elgabry Rangel =

Mexican footballer (born 1982)

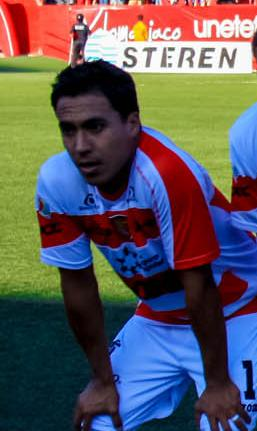

Personal information
- Full name: Elgabry Ricardo Rangel Especiano
- Date of birth: 3 April 1982 (age 44)
- Place of birth: Tuxpan, Nayarit, Mexico
- Height: 1.62 m (5 ft 4 in)
- Position: Midfielder

Senior career*
Years	Team	Apps	(Gls)
2002–2007	Santos Laguna	133	(10)
2007–2012	Estudiantes Tecos	140	(7)
2012–2013	Chiapas	9	(0)
2013–2014	Estudiantes Tecos	32	(2)
2014–2015	Zacatecas	19	(0)
2016–2017	Tepic	3	(0)
Total		336	(19)
- * Club domestic league appearances and goals

Elgabry Ricardo Rangel Especiano (Note: In this Spanish name, the first or paternal surname is Rangel and the second or maternal family name is Especiano.) (born 3 April 1982) is a former Mexican footballer who last played as a midfielder for Coras de Tepic in the Ascenso MX.

== Santos Laguna ==
Rangel began his career with Santos Laguna, and made his debut for them on 25 August 2002 in the Primera División de México Apertura 2002 tournament. In total he made 130 appearances in the Primera Division with Santos, before moving to Estudiantes Tecos for the Primera División de México Apertura 2007 tournament.

== Tecos UAG ==
As of the end of the 2009–10 Primera División de México season Rangel had made 80 Primera appearances for Tecos, scoring on 3 occasions. Rangel scored his first goal for Tecos against Necaxa in the 63rd minute of their match on 14 February 2009.
