= Juan Carlos Leaño =

Mexican footballer (born 1977)

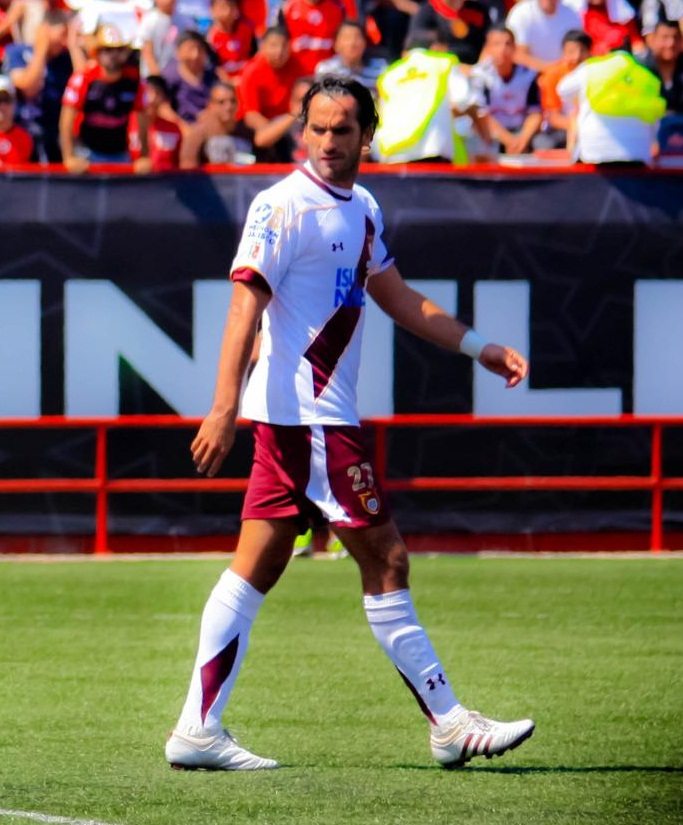
- Leaño playing for Tecos

Personal information
- Full name: Juan Carlos Leaño Del Castillo
- Date of birth: 22 November 1977 (age 48)
- Place of birth: Guadalajara, Jalisco, México
- Height: 1.86 m (6 ft 1 in)
- Position: Defender

Senior career*
Years	Team	Apps	(Gls)
1999–2012	Tecos	303	(8)
- * Club domestic league appearances and goals

Juan Carlos Leaño Del Castillo (born 22 November 1977) is a Mexican former professional footballer who played as a defender. He played his whole career with Tecos. Leaño made his professional debut with Estudiantes in 1998. He is also the son of José Antonio Leaño, chairman of the club. On 27 April 2012, after his team lost the permanence in the Mexican Primera División Leaño announced his retirement from football.

In 2026, he became Rector of the Universidad Autónoma de Guadalajara (where he played professional football, and which has been owned by his family since its foundation).

== See also ==
- List of one-club men
