= Damián Zamogilny =

Argentine-Mexican footballer (born 1980)

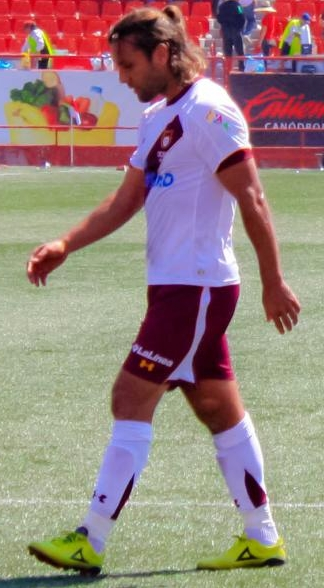
- Zamogilny playing for Tecos

Personal information
- Full name: Jorge Damián Zamogilny
- Date of birth: 5 January 1980 (age 46)
- Place of birth: Buenos Aires, Argentina
- Height: 1.72 m (5 ft 8 in)
- Position: Midfielder

Youth career
- 1999–2000: Independiente

Senior career*
| Years | Team | Apps | (Gls) |
| 2000–2001 | Independiente | | |
| 2001–2002 | Querétaro | | |
| 2002–2003 | Real de La Plata | | |
| 2006–2008 | Puebla | 75 | (5) |
| 2008–2011 | Tecos | 100 | (12) |
| 2012 | Atlas | 5 | (0) |
| 2013–2014 | Irapuato | 9 | (0) |

Managerial career
- 2019: Puebla (assistant)
- * Club domestic league appearances and goals

Jorge Damián Zamogilny (also known as "El Ruso", born 5 January 1980) is an Argentine former professional footballer. He is a Mexican naturalized citizen.

Zamogilny started his football career in the youth team of Club Atlético Independiente in Argentina. He moved to Mexican football before he ever played for the Independiente first team. After several years in the lower leagues of Mexican football, he won promotion to the Mexican Primera División with Puebla. He used to play as a midfielder and has played in Puebla's starting lineup in many games. In 2008, he joined Mexican side Tecos UAG.

== Honours ==
Puebla

- Primera A: Clausura 2007
- Ascenso a Primera: 2007
