= 2011–12 Tigres UANL season =

Tigres
2011–12 season
- Manager: Ricardo Ferretti
- Stadium: Estadio Universitario
- Apertura 2011: 3rd Champions
- Clausura 2012: 5th Fina Phase Semi-finals
- Copa Libertadores: First Stage
- Top goalscorer: League: Apertura: Héctor Mancilla (9); Clausura: Lucas Lobos (8); All: Lucas Lobos (16)
Home colours	Away colours	Third colours

The 2011–12 Tigres season was the 65th professional season of Mexico's top-flight football league. The season is split into two tournaments—the Torneo Apertura and the Torneo Clausura—each with identical formats and each contested by the same eighteen teams. Tigres began their season on July 23, 2011, against Cruz Azul, Tigres play their home games on Saturdays at 7:00pm local time.

== Torneo Apertura ==
=== Squad ===
Note: Flags indicate national team as defined under FIFA eligibility rules; some limited exceptions apply. Players may hold more than one non-FIFA nationality.

No.	Pos.	Nation	Player
1	GK	MEX	Enrique Palos
2	DF	MEX	Israel Jiménez
3	DF	BRA	Juninho (Team Vice-Captain)
4	DF	MEX	Hugo Ayala
5	DF	MEX	Éder Borelli
6	DF	MEX	Jorge Torres Nilo
8	MF	USA	Jonathan Bornstein
9	FW	CHI	Héctor Mancilla
10	MF	BRA	Danilinho
11	MF	ARG	Damián Álvarez
13	GK	MEX	Jorge Díaz de León
14	MF	MEX	Fernando Navarro Morán
15	MF	MEX	Manuel Viniegra

No.	Pos.	Nation	Player
16	MF	ARG	Lucas Lobos (Team captain)
17	MF	MEX	David Toledo
18	MF	MEX	Francisco Acuña
19	FW	MEX	Alan Pulido
20	FW	MEX	Emmanuel Cerda
21	GK	MEX	Aarón Fernández
22	MF	MEX	Édgar Pacheco
23	MF	GRE	Lampros Kontogiannis
24	DF	MEX	José Arturo Rivas
25	MF	MEX	Abraham Stringel
27	GK	MEX	Austin Guerrero
28	MF	MEX	Alberto Acosta
29	MF	MEX	Jesús Dueñas
30	DF	MEX	Carlos Salcido

=== Regular season ===
==== Apertura 2011 results ====
July 23, 2011 Round 1	Tigres	1–1	Cruz Azul	Estadio Universitario, San Nicolás
19:00	Mancilla 38', (yellow card) 70'; Torres Nilo (yellow card) 43'	Report	Pinto (yellow card) 17'; Aquino 19'; Flores (yellow card) 22'; Ponce (yellow card) 49'	Referee: Paul Delgadillo

July 30, 2011 Round 2	Querétaro	0–0	Tigres	Estadio Corregidora, Querétaro
17:00	Ruiz (yellow card) 46'; Neill (yellow card) 90+3'		Ayala (yellow card) 24'; Toledo (yellow card) 89'	Referee: Juan Genaro Medrano

August 3, 2011 Round 3	Tigres	2–2	Toluca	Estadio Universitario, San Nicolás
20:45	Mancilla 16', (yellow card) 87'; Ayala (yellow card) 47'; Lobos 61'; Viniegra (yellow card) 90'	Report	Gamboa (yellow card) 30'; Calderón 71'; Sinha 79', (yellow card) 90'; Araújo (yellow card) 87'	Referee: Jorge Antonio Pérez

August 5, 2011 Round 4	Estudiantes Tecos	0–1	Tigres	Estadio Tres de Marzo, Zapopan
20:10		Report	Jiménez 62'	Referee: José Alfredo Peñaloza

August 13, 2011 Round 5	Tigres	2–2	América	Estadio Universitario, San Nicolás
18:00	Molina (yellow card) 56'; Treviño 66' (o.g.); Navarrete (yellow card) 81'; Mancilla 84'; Morán (yellow card) 90+2'	Report	Benítez 17', (yellow card) 90+2'; González 89'	Referee: César Arturo Ramos

August 20, 2011 Round 6	Tigres	1–0	San Luis	Estadio Universitario, San Nicolás
19:00	Torres Nilo (yellow card) 30'; Álvarez (yellow card) 41'; Jiménez 86'; Acuña	Report	Arroyo (yellow card) 25'; Sánchez (yellow card) 25'; Matellán (red card) 60'; Moreno (yellow card) 60' (yellow-red card) 64'; Aguirre (yellow card) 73'	Referee: Miguel Ángel Flores

August 27, 2011 Round 7	Atlas	0–1	Tigres	Estadio Jalisco, Guadalajara
20:45	Vidrio (yellow card) 55' (red card) 86'; Mendoza (red card) 90'	Report	Álvarez (yellow card) 19', (goal) 22'; Rivas (yellow card) 37'	Referee: Francisco Chacón

September 10, 2011 Round 8	Tigres	5–0	Pachuca	Estadio Universitario, San Nicolás
19:00	Mancilla 19', 36', 79'; Lobos 24'; Castillo 69' (o.g.); Torres Nilo (yellow card) 84'; Pacheco (yellow card) 87'	Report	Chávez (yellow card) 68'; Muñoz Mustafá (yellow card) 73'	Referee: Miguel Ángel Ayala

September 17, 2011 Round 9	Atlante	1–0	Tigres	Estadio Quintana Roo, Cancún
21:00	Amione 18', (yellow card) 89' (yellow-red card) 89'; Luna (yellow card) 29'; Rojas (yellow card) 43'; Cuevas (yellow card) 48'	Report	Danilinho (yellow card) 48'; Toledo 60'; Torres Milo (yellow card) 62'	Referee: Mauricio Morales

September 24, 2011 Round 10	Tigres	1–1	Chiapas	Estadio Universitario, San Nicolás
19:00	Álvarez (yellow card) 49'; Lobos 79', (yellow card) 80'	Report	Valdéz (yellow card) 23'; M. Martínez (yellow card) 44'; Rodríguez (yellow card) 49', (goal) 89'; Andrade (yellow card) 76'; Razo (yellow card) 81'	Referee: Ricardo Arellano

October 2, 2011 Round 11	Tijuana	1–1	Tigres	Estadio Caliente, Tijuana
12:00	Arévalo Ríos (yellow card) 22'; Enríquez (yellow card) 27'; Gandolfi (yellow card) 73', (goal) 88'	Report	Torres Nilo (yellow card) 21'; Toledo (yellow card) 34'; Lobos 40'; Jiménez (yellow card) 74'	Referee: Erim Ramírez

October 8, 2011 Round 12	Tigres	4–1	UNAM	Estadio Universitario, San Nicolás
19:00	Lobos 18'; Juninho 28'; Mancilla 36'; Viniegra 39'; Álvarez (yellow card) 49'; Ayala (yellow card) 69'	Report	Fuentes (yellow card) 17' (yellow-red card) 52'; Ramírez (yellow card) 34'; Velarde (yellow card) 53'; Herrera 82'	Referee: Miguel Ángel Flores

October 14, 2011 Round 13	Morelia	2–0	Tigres	Estadio Morelos, Morelia
18:00	Vilar (yellow card) 44'; Sabah 79'; M. Pérez (yellow card) 84'; Lozano 88' (pen.)	Report	Juninho (yellow card) 54'; Viniegra (yellow card) 71'; Torres Nilo (yellow card) 74'; Salcido (yellow card) 75'	Referee: Miguel Ángel Ortega

October 22, 2011 Round 14	Tigres	0–0	Monterrey	Estadio Universitario, San Nicolás
19:00	Torres Nilo (yellow card) 4'; Salcido (yellow card) 90'	Report	L. Pérez (yellow card) 59'; S. Pérez (yellow card) 74'	Referee: Paul Delgadillo

October 26, 2011 Round 15	Guadalajara	1–0	Tigres	Estadio Jalisco, Guadalajara
20:00	Sánchez (yellow card) 34'; Gallardo (yellow card) 45'; Medina 51'; Reynoso (yellow card) 68'	Report	Juninho (yellow card) 20'; Lobos (yellow card) 24'; Viniegra (red card) 25'; Jiménez (yellow card) 28'; Dueñas (yellow card) 41'	Referee: José Alfredo Peñaloza

October 29, 2011 Round 16	Tigres	2–1	Santos Laguna	Estadio Universitario, San Nicolás
19:00	Danilinho 41'; Acosta 65'	Report	Suárez 45'; Baloy (yellow card) 77'	Referee: Jorge Antonio Pérez

November 6, 2011 Round 17	Puebla	0–1	Tigres	Estadio Cuauhtémoc, Puebla
12:00	Durán (yellow card) 21'; Ortiz (yellow card) 25'; Polo (yellow card) 37'; Luis García (yellow card) 62'; Beasley (yellow card) 69'	Report	Dueñas (yellow card) 11', (goal) 27'; Juninho (yellow card) 65'	Referee: Fabricio Morales

=== Final phase ===
November 20, 2011 Quarter-finals	Pachuca	0–1	Tigres	Estadio Hidalgo, Pachuca
18:00	Cervantes (yellow card) 28'; Castillo (yellow card) 56'; López (yellow card) 70'; Chitiva (yellow card) 90'	Report	Mancilla 26'; Salcido (red card) 62'	Referee: Paul Delgadillo

November 27, 2011 Quarter-finals	Tigres	3–0	Pachuca	Estadio Universitario, San Nicolás
19:00	Viniegra 11'; Lobos 26'; Álvarez 36'	Report	Herrera (yellow card) 28' (yellow-red card) 61'; Muñoz Mustafa (yellow card) 69'	Referee: Francisco Chacón

Tigres advanced 4–0 on aggregate

December 1, 2011 Semi-finals	Querétaro	0–0	Tigres	Estadio Corregidora, Querétaro
17:00	M. Jiménez (yellow card) 22'; Bueno (yellow card) 34'; López Mondragón (yellow card) 70'	Report	I. Jiménez (yellow card) 45'; Torres Nilo (yellow card) 49'; Mancilla (yellow card) 53'	Referee: Roberto García

December 4, 2011 Semi-finals	Tigres	1–0	Querétaro	Estadio Universitario, San Nicolás
19:00	Mancilla (yellow card) 36'; Lobos (yellow card) 41'; López Mondragón 44' (o.g.)	Report	Ruíz (yellow card) 11'; M. Jiménez (yellow card) 42'; García Arías (yellow card) 77'; Rico (yellow card) 83'; Vázquez (red card) 90+3'	Referee: Francisco Chacón

Tigres advanced 1–0 on aggregate

December 8, 2011 Final	Santos Laguna	0–1	Tigres	Estadio Corona, Torreón
20:30	Sánchez (yellow card) 23'; Rodríguez (red card) 23'; Estrada (yellow card) 29'; Morales (yellow card) 59'; Baloy (yellow card) 81'	Report	7' Álvarez	Attendance: 30,000; Referee: Paul Delgadillo

December 11, 2011 Final	Tigres	3–1	Santos Laguna	Estadio Universitario, San Nicolás
18:00	Torres Nilo (yellow card) 36'; Lobos (yellow card) 38'; Mancilla 52'; Mancilla (yellow card) 56'; Danilinho 63'; Jiménez (red card) 69'; Pulido 87'	Report	Sánchez (red card) 12'; Salinas (yellow card) 19'; Peralta 30'; Morales (yellow card) 56'; Baloy (red card) 69'; Quintero (yellow card) 70'	Referee: Marco Antonio Rodríguez

Tigres won 4–1 on aggregate

Tigres won their third league title in history

=== Goalscorers ===
Position	Nation	Name	Goals scored
1.	(Chile)	Héctor Mancilla	9
2.	(Argentina)	Lucas Lobos	6
3.	(Argentina)	Damián Álvarez	3
3.		Own Goals	3
5.	(Mexico)	Alberto Acosta	2
5.	(Mexico)	Israel Jiménez	2
5.	(Brazil)	Danilinho	2
5.	(Mexico)	Manuel Viniegra	2
9.	(Mexico)	Jesús Dueñas	1
9.	(Mexico)	Alan Pulido	1
9.	(Brazil)	Juninho	1
TOTAL			31

=== Results ===
==== Results summary ====
Overall								Home						Away					
Pld	W	D	L	GF	GA	GD	Pts	W	D	L	GF	GA	GD	W	D	L	GF	GA	GD
17	7	7	3	22	13	+9	28	4	5	0	18	8	+10	3	2	3	4	5	−1

Last updated: 6 November 2011.
Source: Apertura 2011 results

==== Results by round ====
Round	1	2	3	4	5	6	7	8	9	10	11	12	13	14	15	16	17
Ground	H	A	H	A	H	H	A	H	A	H	A	H	A	H	A	H	A
Result	D	D	D	W	D	W	W	W	L	D	D	W	L	D	L	W	W
Position	9	11	11	7	6	4	2	2	4	4	3	1	4	4	6	4	3

Updated to match(es) played on 6 November 2011. Source: Apertura 2011 results and mediotiempo.com
A = Away; H = Home; W = Win; D = Draw; L = Loss

== Transfers ==
=== In ===
#	Pos	Nat	Player	Age	From	Date	Notes
	MF	(Mexico)	José Tostado	17	Guadalajara	September 22, 2011	
	MF	(Mexico)	Elías Hernández	23	Pachuca	December 21, 2011	

=== Out ===
#	Pos	Nat	Player	Age	To	Date	Notes
10	MF	(Brazil)	Danilinho	24	Atletico Mineiro		

== Torneo Clausura ==
=== Squad ===
Note: Flags indicate national team as defined under FIFA eligibility rules; some limited exceptions apply. Players may hold more than one non-FIFA nationality.

No.	Pos.	Nation	Player
1	GK	MEX	Enrique Palos
2	DF	MEX	Israel Jiménez
3	DF	BRA	Juninho (Team Vice-Captain)
4	DF	MEX	Hugo Ayala
5	DF	MEX	Éder Borelli
6	DF	MEX	Jorge Torres Nilo
8	MF	USA	Jonathan Bornstein
9	FW	CHI	Héctor Mancilla
10	FW	MEX	Elías Hernández
11	FW	MEX	Damián Álvarez
13	GK	MEX	Jorge Díaz de León
14	MF	MEX	Fernando Navarro
15	MF	MEX	Manuel Viniegra
16	FW	ARG	Lucas Lobos (Team captain)

No.	Pos.	Nation	Player
17	MF	MEX	David Toledo
18	MF	MEX	Francisco Acuña
19	FW	MEX	Alan Pulido
20	FW	MEX	Emmanuel Cerda
21	GK	MEX	Aarón Fernández
22	MF	MEX	Édgar Pacheco
23	MF	MEX	Lampros Kontogiannis
24	DF	MEX	José Arturo Rivas
25	MF	MEX	Abraham Stringel
26	FW	BRA	Edno Roberto Cunha
28	MF	MEX	Alberto Acosta
29	MF	MEX	Jesús Dueñas
30	DF	MEX	Carlos Salcido

=== Regular season ===
==== Clausura 2012 results ====
January 7, 2012 Round 1	Cruz Azul	1–1	Tigres	Estadio Azul, Mexico City
17:00	Giménez 6'; Castro (yellow card) 69'	Report	Lobos 71'	Referee: Óscar Macias

January 14, 2012 Round 2	Tigres	1–0	Querétaro	Estadio Universitario, San Nicolás
19:00	Salcido (yellow card) 35'; Juninho 40'; Mancilla (yellow card) 45+'; Acuña (yellow card) 45+'	Report	Jiménez (yellow card) 45+'; García (yellow card) 60'; Garcia Arias (yellow card) 61'	Referee: Fernando Guerrero

August 3, 2011 Round 3	Toluca	2–1	Tigres	Estadio Nemesio Díez, Toluca
12:00	Novaretti (yellow card) 36'; Calderón 45+'; Alonso 48'	Report	Mancilla 24' (pen.); Pacheco (yellow card) 28'	Referee: Jorge Isaac Rojas

January 28, 2012 Round 4	Tigres	2–1	Estudiantes Tecos	Estadio Universitario, San Nicolás
19:00	Pulido 5'; Rivas 21'; Salcido (yellow card) 69'; Torres Nilo (yellow card) 73'	Report	Castro (yellow card) 26'; Sambueza 55' (pen.); Davino (yellow card) 90'	Referee: Miguel Ángel Ayala

February 5, 2012 Round 5	América	0–1	Tigres	Estadio Azteca, Mexico City
16:00	Vuoso (yellow card) 90'; Rosinei (yellow card) 90+3'	Report	Jiménez (yellow card) 30'; Mancilla 34'; Juninho (yellow card) 63'; Dueñas (yellow card) 86'	Referee: Roberto García Orozco

February 11, 2012 Round 6	San Luis	0–2	Tigres	Estadio Alfonso Lastras, San Luis Potosí
20:45	Velasco (yellow card) 13'; Moreno (yellow card) 24'; Torres (yellow card) 83'	Report	Jiménez 33'; Ayala (yellow card) 44'; Lobos 56'; Edno (yellow card) 60'; Álvarez (yellow card) 83'	Referee: Miguel Ángel Ortega

February 18, 2012 Round 7	Tigres	0–0	Atlas	Estadio Universitario, San Nicolás
19:00	Álvarez (red card) 26'	Report	Gutiérrez (yellow card) 7'; Santos (yellow card) 90'	Referee: Francisco Chacón

February 25, 2012 Round 8	Pachuca	1–1	Tigres	Estadio Hidalgo, Pachuca
19:00	López 22', (yellow card) 39'; Brambila (yellow card) 37'; Muñoz Mustafá (yellow card) 39'; Vidrio (yellow card) 39'; Cejas (yellow card) 59'; Herrera (yellow card) 65'	Report	Jiménez (yellow card) 24'; Hernández 90+2'; Torres Nilo (yellow card) 90+3'	Referee: Fabricio Morales

March 3, 2012 Round 9	Tigres	1–0	Atlante	Estadio Universitario, San Nicolás
19:00	Lobos 13'; Juninho (yellow card) 22'; Pulido (yellow card) 71'	Report	Venegas (yellow card) 24'; Guagua (yellow card) 62'; Hernández (yellow card) 79'; Fonseca (yellow card) 89'	Referee: Miguel Ángel Chacón

March 10, 2012 Round 10	Chiapas	2–2	Tigres	Estadio Victor Manuel Reyna, Tuxtla Gutiérrez
17:00	Noriega (yellow card) 15'; Rey 48', 57'; J. Martínez (yellow card) 64'; Corral (yellow card) 70'; Fuentes (yellow card) 87'	Report	Ayala (yellow card) 10'; Álvarez (yellow card) 26'; Lobos 39'; Edno 71' (pen.); Salcido (yellow card) 75'	Referee: Maurico Morales

March 17, 2012 Round 11	Tigres	1–0	Tijuana	Estadio Universitario, San Nicolás
19:00	Lobos 9' (pen.); Ayala (yellow card) 75'; Salcido (yellow card) 89'	Report	Riascos (yellow card) 45+'; Fernández (yellow card) 75'; Pulido (yellow card) 83'	Referee: Roberto García Orozco

March 25, 2012 Round 12	UNAM	0–2	Tigres	Estadio Olímpico Universitario, Mexico City
12:00	Velarde (yellow card) 49'; Bravo (yellow card) 53'	Report	Cerda 35'; Rivas (yellow card) 71'; Lobos 77'	Referee: Jorge Isaac Rojas

March 31, 2012 Round 13	Tigres	4–1	Morelia	Estadio Universitario, San Nicolás
19:00	Hernández 14'; Salcido (yellow card) 26'; Edno 57'; Torres Nilo (yellow card) 63'; Lobos 68'; Álvarez 75'	Report	Sabah 21'; Huiqui (yellow card) 51'; Ramírez (yellow card) 56'; Pérez (yellow card) 87'	Referee: Miguel Ángel Ayala

April 7, 2012 Round 14	Monterrey	2–0	Tigres	Estadio Tecnológico, Monterrey
19:00	Zavala (yellow card) 30' de Nigris 42', 54', (yellow card) 43'; L. Pérez (yellow card) 67'	Report	Lobos (yellow card) 14'; Torres Nilo (yellow card) 39'; Toledo (yellow card) 40'; Jiménez (yellow card) 52'; Salcido (yellow card) 55'; Acosta (yellow card) 75'	Referee: Mauricio Morales

April 14, 2012 Round 15	Tigres	2–1	Guadalajara	Estadio Universitario, San Nicolás
19:00	Jiménez (yellow card) 23'; Ayala (yellow card) 27'; Lobos (yellow card) 54'; Salcido 72'; Álvarez (yellow card) 79'; Juninho 90+2'	Report	Arellano 21'; Torres (yellow card) 33' (yellow-red card) 38'; Fabián (yellow card) 38' (yellow-red card) 73'; Sánchez (red card) 90+2'	Referee: José Alfredo Peñaloza

April 21, 2012 Round 16	Santos Laguna	3–0	Tigres	Estadio TSM Corona, Torreón
19:00	Salinas 20'; Quintero 24'; Rodríguez 66' (pen.)	Report	Palos (yellow card) 64'; Ayala (yellow card) 90+2'	Referee: Jorge Antonio Pérez

April 28, 2012 Round 17	Tigres	1–2	Puebla	Estadio Universitario, San Nicolás
19:00	Lobos 33'	Report	Polo (yellow card) 35'; Luis García 83'; Padilla 88'	Referee: Marco Antonio Rodríguez

=== Final phase ===
May 3, 2012 Quarter-finals	Tigres	1–0	Morelia	Estadio Universitario, San Nicolás
21:00	Mancilla 23'; Torres Nilo (yellow card) 59'; Álvarez (yellow card) 90'	Report	Huiqui (yellow card) 19'; Valdez (yellow card) 82'; Romero (yellow card) 88'; Ramírez (yellow card) 90'	Referee: Jorge Isaac Rojas

May 6, 2012 Quarter-finals	Morelia	1–4	Tigres	Estadio Morelos, Morelia
20:00	Pérez (yellow card) 30'; Sabah (yellow card) 50', (goal) 86'; Romero (yellow card) 73'	Report	Jiménez (yellow card) 32'; Ayala (yellow card) 48', (goal) 64'; Lobos 74'; Edno 76'; Hernández 90+1' (pen.)	Referee: Mauricio Morales

Tigres advanced 5–1 on aggregate

May 10, 2012 Semi-finals	Tigres	1–1	Santos Laguna	Estadio Universitario, San Nicolás
20:00	Lobos 69'	Report	Rodríguez (yellow card) 5'; Estrada 62'; Salinas (yellow card) 75'	Referee: Francisco Chacón

May 13, 2012 Semi-finals	Santos Laguna	2–2	Tigres	Estadio TSM Corona, Torreón
20:00	Baloy (yellow card) 51'; Quintero (yellow card) 65'; Peralta 86', 89'	Report	Mancilla 6', 26'; Juninho (yellow card) 46'; Dueñas (yellow card) 83'	Referee: Marco Antonio Rodríguez

Santos Laguna advanced 3–3 on aggregate due to being the higher seed in the classification phase

=== Goalscorers ===
==== Regular season ====
Position	Nation	Name	Goals scored
1.	(Argentina)	Lucas Lobos	8
2.	(Brazil)	Edno	2
2.	(Mexico)	Elías Hernández	2
2.	(Chile)	Héctor Mancilla	2
2.	(Brazil)	Juninho	2
6.	(Mexico)	Damián Álvarez	1
6.	(Mexico)	Emmanuel Cerda	1
6.	(Mexico)	Israel Jiménez	1
6.	(Mexico)	Alan Pulido	1
6.	(Mexico)	José Arturo Rivas	1
6.	(Mexico)	Carlos Salcido	1
TOTAL			22

==== Final phase ====
Position	Nation	Name	Goals scored
1.	(Chile)	Héctor Mancilla	3
2.	(Argentina)	Lucas Lobos	2
3.	(Mexico)	Hugo Ayala	1
3.	(Brazil)	Edno	1
3.	(Mexico)	Elías Hernández	1
TOTAL			8

=== Results ===
==== Results summary ====
Overall								Home						Away					
Pld	W	D	L	GF	GA	GD	Pts	W	D	L	GF	GA	GD	W	D	L	GF	GA	GD
17	9	4	4	22	16	+6	31	6	1	1	12	5	+7	3	3	3	10	11	−1

Last updated: 28 April 2012.
Source: Clausura 2012 results

==== Results by round ====
Round	1	2	3	4	5	6	7	8	9	10	11	12	13	14	15	16	17
Ground	A	H	A	H	A	A	H	A	H	A	H	A	H	A	H	A	H
Result	D	W	L	W	W	W	D	D	W	D	W	W	W	L	W	L	L
Position	9	7	11	6	3	1	1	4	3	4	4	3	2	3	1	4	5

Updated to match(es) played on 29 April 2012. Source: Clausura 2012 results and mediotiempo.com
A = Away; H = Home; W = Win; D = Draw; L = Loss

== Copa Libertadores ==
=== Preliminary Round ===
January 25, 2012 1	Unión Española (Chile)	1–0	(Mexico) Tigres	Estadio Santa Laura-Universidad SEK, Santiago
18:50 UTC−03:00	Barriga 58'	Report		Referee: Alfredo Intriago (Ecuador)

February 2, 2012 2	Tigres (Mexico)	2–2	(Chile) Unión Española	Estadio Universitario, San Nicolás de los Garza
20:00 UTC−06:00	Pulido 14', 22'	Report	Herrera 38' (pen.); Jaime 68'	Referee: Saúl Laverni (Argentina)

Unión Española won on points 4–1.

=== Goalscorers ===
Position	Nation	Name	Goals scored
1.	(Mexico)	Alan Pulido	2
TOTAL			2
