= 2012–13 Tigres UANL season =

Tigres
2012–13 season
- Chairman: Alejandro Rodríguez
- Manager: Ricardo Ferretti
- Stadium: Estadio Universitario
- Apertura 2012: 12th
- Clausura 2013: 1st
- Champions League: Quarterfinals
- Top goalscorer: League: Apertura: Lucas Lobos (6); Clausura: Emanuel Villa (8); All: Lucas Lobos (12)
Home colours	Away colours	Third colours

The 2012–13 Tigres season is the 66th professional season of Mexico's top-flight football league. The season is split into two tournaments—the Torneo Apertura and the Torneo Clausura—each with identical formats and each contested by the same eighteen teams. Tigres began their season on July 20, 2012, against Chiapas, Tigres play their home games on Saturdays at 7:00 pm local time.

== Torneo Apertura ==
=== Squad ===
Note: Flags indicate national team as defined under FIFA eligibility rules; some limited exceptions apply. Players may hold more than one non-FIFA nationality.

No.	Pos.	Nation	Player
1	GK	MEX	Enrique Palos
2	DF	MEX	Israel Jiménez
3	DF	BRA	Juninho (vice-captain)
4	DF	MEX	Hugo Ayala
5	DF	MEX	Éder Borelli
6	DF	MEX	Jorge Torres Nilo
8	DF	USA	Jonathan Bornstein
9	FW	ESP	Luis García Fernández
10	MF	MEX	Elías Hernández
11	MF	MEX	Damián Álvarez
13	GK	MEX	Jorge Díaz de León
14	DF	MEX	Fernando Navarro
15	MF	MEX	Manuel Viniegra

No.	Pos.	Nation	Player
16	MF	ARG	Lucas Lobos (captain)
17	MF	MEX	David Toledo
18	MF	MEX	Francisco Acuña
19	FW	MEX	Alan Pulido
21	GK	MEX	Aarón Fernández
22	FW	MEX	Taufic Guarch
23	DF	MEX	Alonso Zamora
24	DF	MEX	José Arturo Rivas
25	DF	MEX	Abraham Stringel
28	MF	MEX	Alberto Acosta
29	MF	MEX	Jesús Dueñas
30	MF	MEX	Carlos Salcido
31	DF	BRA	Edno

=== Regular season ===
Win Draw Loss

==== Apertura 2012 results ====
July 20, 2012 Round 1	Chiapas	0 – 4	Tigres	Tuxtla Gutiérrez, Chiapas
19:30	M. Martínez (yellow card) 83'	Report	Pulido 6'; Juninho 14'; Lobos 35'; Viniegra 40'; Torres Nilo (yellow card) 77'	Stadium: Estadio Victor Manuel Reyna; Referee: Erim Ramírez

July 28, 2012 Round 2	Tigres	2 – 1	Atlante	San Nicolás de los Garza, Nuevo León
19:00	Torres Nilo (yellow card) 41'; Lobos 75' (pen.); Ayala 85'	Report	Martínez (yellow card) 36'; Paredes 50'; Guerrero (yellow card) 61'; Fonseca (yellow card) 71'	Stadium: Estadio Universitario; Referee: Miguel Ángel Ortega

August 4, 2012 Round 3	Atlas	0 – 0	Tigres	Guadalajara, Jalisco
21:00	Cufré (yellow card) 28'	Report		Stadium: Estadio Jalisco; Attendance: 24,119; Referee: Óscar Macias

August 11, 2012 Round 4	Tigres	2 – 2	Querétaro	San Nicolás de los Garza, Nuevo León
19:00	Ayala (yellow card) 21'; Lobos 48'; Juninho 79'	Report	Alcántar (yellow card) 29'; Cortés (yellow card) 34'; Ayala 64' (o.g.); Tapía 70'	Stadium: Estadio Universitario; Attendance: 37,050; Referee: Luis Enrique Santander

August 17, 2012 Round 5	Tijuana	2 – 1	Tigres	Tijuana, Baja California
17:30	Moreno 15'; Arce 33'; Olsina (yellow card) 83'	Report	Hernández 63'	Stadium: Estadio Caliente; Attendance: 21,733; Referee: José Alfredo Peñaloza

August 25, 2012 Round 6	Tigres	1 – 1	Toluca	San Nicolás de los Garza, Nuevo León
19:00	Lobos 11', (yellow card) 59'; Juninho (yellow card) 57'; Álvarez (yellow card) 90+4'	Report	Lucas Silva 6'; Novaretti (yellow card) 52'	Stadium: Estadio Universitario; Attendance: 39,321; Referee: Roberto García Orozco

September 1, 2012 Round 7	Santos Laguna	3 – 1	Tigres	Torreón, Coahuila
19:00	Quintero 12', 74'; Peralta 15'; Adschi (yellow card) 21'; Rodríguez (yellow card) 36'; Ramírez (yellow card) 82'	Report	Juninho (yellow card) 10'; Lobos 37' (pen.)	Stadium: Estadio TSM Corona; Attendance: 23,800; Referee: Ricardo Arellano

September 15, 2012 Round 8	Tigres	2 – 0	Cruz Azul	San Nicolás de los Garza, Nuevo León
19:00	Álvarez (yellow card) 33'; Luis García 44', 61'	Report	Bravo (yellow card) 23'; Torrado (yellow card) 69'	Stadium: Estadio Universitario; Attendance: 39,120; Referee: Fabricio Morales

September 21, 2012 Round 9	Morelia	1 – 1	Tigres	Morelia, Michoacán
21:30	Huiqui (yellow card) 42'; Ramírez (yellow card) 64'; Rojas (yellow card) 69'; Ochoa 72'	Report	Luis García (yellow card) 39'; Hernández (yellow card) 45+'; Lobos 65' (pen.)	Stadium: Estadio Morelos; Attendance: 13,601; Referee: Fernando Guerrero

September 29, 2012 Round 10	Tigres	0 – 0	San Luis	San Nicolás de los Garza, Nuevo León
19:00	Salcido (yellow card) 75'; Ayala (yellow card) 88'; Álvarez (yellow card) 90'	Report	Arredondo (yellow card) 77'	Stadium: Estadio Universitario; Attendance: 38,900; Referee: Miguel Ángel Chacón

October 2, 2012 Round 11	Guadalajara	2 – 1	Tigres	Zapopan, Jalisco
19:00	Márquez 22'; Morales 62'	Report	Pulido 78'	Stadium: Estadio Omnilife; Attendance: 15,528; Referee: Marco Antonio Rodríguez

October 6, 2012 Round 12	Tigres	1 – 2	Puebla	San Nicolás de los Garza, Nuevo León
19:00	Álvarez 13', (yellow card) 85'; Zamora (yellow card) 48'	Report	Durán (yellow card) 12'; Dimayuga (yellow card) 16' (yellow-red card) 89'; Chávez 62'; Gastélum (yellow card) 57'; Toloza 78'; Alustiza (yellow card) 90+3'	Stadium: Estadio Universitario; Referee: Jorge Isaac Rojas

October 13, 2012 Round 13	León	2 – 0	Tigres	León, Guanajuato
19:00	Britos 1', (yellow card) 31'; Maz 35' (pen.); Burbano (yellow card) 44'	Report	Salcido (yellow card) 31'; Viniegra (yellow card) 33'; Álvarez (yellow card) 66'	Stadium: Estadio León; Attendance: 22,983; Referee: Erim Ramírez

October 20, 2012 Round 14	Tigres	5 – 0	Pumas	San Nicolás de los Garza, Nuevo León
19:00	Palacios 20' (o.g.); Acosta 21', 27', 60', (yellow card) 45+1'; Dueñas (yellow card) 34'; Torres Nilo (yellow card) 36'; Hernández 82'	Report	Verón (yellow card) 9'; Fuentes (yellow card) 37'	Stadium: Estadio Universitario; Attendance: 40,214; Referee: Miguel Ángel Flores

October 27, 2012 Round 15	Pachuca	1 – 0	Tigres	Pachuca, Hidalgo
19:00	Meráz 50'; Torres (yellow card) 90+1'	Report	Juninho (yellow card) 88'	Stadium: Estadio Hidalgo; Attendance: 22,951; Referee: José Alfredo Peñaloza

November 3, 2012 Round 16	Monterrey	0 – 1	Tigres	Monterrey, Nuevo León
21:00	Pérez (yellow card) 35'	Report	Torres Nilo (yellow card) 24'; Lobos (yellow card) 54'; Pulido 62'; Jiménez (yellow card) 90+1'	Stadium: Estadio Tecnológico; Attendance: 32,233; Referee: Marco Antonio Rodríguez

November 10, 2012 Round 17	Tigres	1 – 1	América	San Nicolás de los Garza, Nuevo León
19:00	Juninho 40'; Rivas (yellow card) 90+1'	Report	Reyes (yellow card) 55'; Aguilar 67'; Bermúdez (yellow card) 90'	Stadium: Estadio Universitario; Attendance: 40,150; Referee: Fabricio Morales

=== Results ===
==== Results summary ====
Overall								Home						Away					
Pld	W	D	L	GF	GA	GD	Pts	W	D	L	GF	GA	GD	W	D	L	GF	GA	GD
17	5	6	6	23	18	+5	21	3	4	1	14	7	+7	2	2	5	9	11	−2

Last updated: 10 November 2012.
Source: Apertura 2012 results

==== Results by round ====
Round	1	2	3	4	5	6	7	8	9	10	11	12	13	14	15	16	17
Ground	A	H	A	H	A	H	A	H	A	H	A	H	A	H	A	A	H
Result	W	W	D	D	L	D	L	W	D	D	L	L	L	W	L	W	D
Position	1	2	2	3	7	7	11	7	7	8	8	12	12	11	14	11	12

Updated to match(es) played on 11 November 2012. Source: Apertura 2012 results and mediotiempo.com
A = Away; H = Home; W = Win; D = Draw; L = Loss

== Torneo Clausura ==
Note: Flags indicate national team as defined under FIFA eligibility rules; some limited exceptions apply. Players may hold more than one non-FIFA nationality.

No.	Pos.	Nation	Player
1	GK	MEX	Enrique Palos
2	DF	MEX	Israel Jiménez
3	DF	BRA	Juninho (vice-captain)
4	DF	MEX	Hugo Ayala
6	DF	MEX	Jorge Torres Nilo
8	MF	USA	Jonathan Bornstein
9	FW	ESP	Luis García Fernández
10	MF	MEX	Elías Hernández
11	MF	MEX	Damián Álvarez
13	GK	MEX	Jorge Díaz de León
15	MF	MEX	Manuel Viniegra
16	MF	ARG	Lucas Lobos (Captain)
18	MF	USA	José Francisco Torres
19	FW	MEX	Alan Pulido
20	MF	BRA	Danilinho
21	GK	MEX	Aarón Fernández

No.	Pos.	Nation	Player
22	FW	MEX	Taufic Guarch
23	DF	MEX	Alonso Zamora
24	DF	MEX	José Arturo Rivas
25	DF	MEX	Abraham Stringel
27	DF	MEX	Hugo Isaác Rodríguez
28	MF	MEX	Alberto Acosta
29	MF	MEX	Jesús Dueñas
30	MF	MEX	Carlos Salcido
33	FW	ARG	Emanuel Villa
40	DF	MEX	Martín Reyes
44	MF	MEX	Josué Aguilar
45	MF	MEX	Dieter Vargas
48	MF	USA	Victor Garza
50	MF	MEX	Jonathan Espericueta
--	DF	MEX	Abel Fuentes
--	MF	MEX	Uvaldo Luna

=== Regular season ===
Win Draw Loss

==== Clausura 2013 results ====
January 5, 2013 Round 1	Tigres	3 – 0	Chiapas	San Nicolás, Nuevo León
19:00	Villa 50', 68', 86'; Juninho (yellow card) 79'	Report	Martínez (yellow card) 30'; Jiménez (yellow card) 32'; Zamorano (yellow card) 88'	Stadium: Estadio Universitario; Attendance: 41,380; Referee: Víctor Bisguerra Mendiola

January 13, 2013 Round 2	Atlante	1 – 3	Tigres	Cancún, Quintana Roo
18:00	Calvo (yellow card) 37'; Paredes 39'; Ordaz (yellow card) 52' (yellow-red card) 61'; Rojas (yellow card) 88'	Report	Álvarez 10', (yellow card) 65'; Dueñas (yellow card) 38'; Lobos 53'; Ayala (yellow card) 67'; Venegas 74' (o.g.)	Stadium: Estadio Andrés Quintana Roo; Attendance: 10,554; Referee: Miguel Ángel Ayala

January 19, 2013 Round 3	Tigres	1 - 0	Atlas	San Nicolás, Nuevo León
19:00	Villa 38'		Cufré (yellow card) 24'; Torres (yellow card) 60'; Erpen (yellow card) 66'; Millar (yellow card) 90'	Stadium: Estadio Universitario

January 26, 2013 Round 4	Querétaro	0 - 2	Tigres	Querétaro, Querétaro
17:00	Landín (yellow card) 17'		Torres (yellow card) 18'; Villa 40'; Nilo (yellow card) 77'; Danilinho 90'	Stadium: Estadio Corregidora

February 2, 2013 Round 5	Tigres	2 - 2	Tijuana	San Nicolás, Nuevo León
19:00	Lobos 53', 65'; Torres (yellow card) 70'	Report	Moreno 14'; Gandolfi (yellow card) 57'; Pellerano (yellow card) 61'; Riascos 74'	Stadium: Estadio Universitario; Referee: Francisco Chacon Gutierrez

February 10, 2013 Round 6	Toluca	1 - 4	Tigres	Toluca, Estado de México
12:00	Dueñas 78'		Juninho 34'; Lobos; García 90+1'; Villa 90+4'	Stadium: Estadio Nemesio Díez

February 16, 2013 Round 7	Tigres	1 - 1	Santos Laguna	San Nicolás, Nuevo León
19:00	Jiménez (yellow card) 27'; Juninho 37'; Nilo (yellow card) 55'; Salcido (yellow card) 86'		Quintero 2' (yellow card) 84'; Salinas (yellow card) 39'	Stadium: Estadio Universitario

February 23, 2013 Round 8	Cruz Azul	1 - 2	Tigres	Benito Juárez, Mexico City
17:00	Perea (yellow card) 45'; Bertolo (yellow card) 55'; Giménez 59'; Pavone (yellow card) 77'; Torrado (yellow card) 78'		Villa 7', 26'; Salcido (yellow card) 66'; Palos (yellow card) 89'	Stadium: Estadio Azul

March 2, 2013 Round 9	Tigres	1 - 1	Morelia	San Nicolás, Nuevo León
19:00	Lobos 27'		Huiqui (yellow card) 10'; Morales (yellow card) 66'; Ochoa 90+4'	Stadium: Estadio Universitario

March 9, 2013 Round 10	San Luis	1 - 2	Tigres	San Luis Potosí, San Luis Potosí
21:00	Corona 25'; Matos (yellow card) 54'; Córdoba (yellow card) 56'; Zamora (red card) 73'; Cuevas (yellow card) 85'	Report	Lobos 12'; Salcido (yellow card) 54'; García 58'; Ayala (yellow card) 63'	Stadium: Estadio Alfonso Lastras; Attendance: 25,418; Referee: Jose Penaloza Soto

March 16, 2013 Round 11	Tigres	1 - 1	Guadalajara	San Nicolás, Nuevo León
19:00	Álvarez 49'; Lobos (yellow card) 71'; Nilo (yellow card) 76'; García (yellow card) 78'	Report	Pérez (yellow card) 8'; Sabah 35' (yellow card) 90'; Araujo (red card) 70'	Stadium: Estadio Universitario; Attendance: 42,000; Referee: Jorge Perez Duran

March 31, 2013 Round 12	Puebla	1 - 2	Tigres	Puebla, Puebla
12:00	Medina (yellow card) 20'; Beasley 58'; Paredes (yellow card) 84'	Report	García 33'; Nilo (yellow card) 78'; Pulido 87'	Stadium: Estadio Cuauhtémoc; Attendance: 12,000; Referee: Miguel Angel Chacon Viveros

April 6, 2013 Round 13	Tigres	0 - 0	León	San Nicolás, Nuevo León
19:00				Stadium: Estadio Universitario

April 14, 2013 Round 14	Pumas	2 - 1	Tigres	Coyoacán, Mexico City
12:00				Stadium: Estadio Olímpico Universitario

April 20, 2013 Round 15	Tigres	3 - 1	Pachuca	San Nicolás, Nuevo León
19:00				Stadium: Estadio Universitario

April 27, 2013 Round 16	Tigres	0 - 1	Monterrey	San Nicolás, Nuevo León
19:00				Stadium: Estadio Universitario

May 4, 2013 Round 17	América	0 - 2	Tigres	Coyoacán, Mexico City
17:00				Stadium: Estadio Azteca

=== Final phase ===
May 8, 2013 Quarter-finals	Monterrey	1 – 0	Tigres	Monterrey, Nuevo Leon
				Stadium: Estadio Tecnologico

May 11, 2013 Quarter-finals	Tigres	1 – 1	Monterrey	San Nicolás, Nuevo Leon
				Stadium: Estadio Universitario

=== Results ===
==== Results summary ====
Overall								Home						Away					
Pld	W	D	L	GF	GA	GD	Pts	W	D	L	GF	GA	GD	W	D	L	GF	GA	GD
17	10	5	2	24	10	+14	35	3	5	1	9	5	+4	7	0	1	15	5	+10

Source: Clausura 2013 results

==== Results by round ====
Round	1	2	3	4	5	6	7	8	9	10	11	12	13	14	15	16	17
Ground	H	A	H	A	H	A	H	A	H	A	H	A	H	A	H	H	A
Result	W	W	W	W	D	W	D	W	D	W	D	W	D	L	W	L	W
Position	1	1	2	1	1	1	1	1	1	1	1	1	1	1	1	2	1

Updated to match(es) played on 6 January 2013. Source: Clausura 2013 results and mediotiempo.com
A = Away; H = Home; W = Win; D = Draw; L = Loss

== CONCACAF Champions League ==
=== Group 6 ===
Team	Pld	W	D	L	GF	GA	GD	Pts
(Mexico) Tigres	4	2	2	0	12	3	+9	8
(Costa Rica) Alajuelense	4	2	1	1	4	7	-3	7
(Nicaragua) Real Estelí	4	0	1	3	1	7	−6	1

	ALA	EST	Tigres
Alajuelense	—	1–0	2–2
Real Estelí	0–1	—	1–1
Tigres	5–0	4–0	—

August 1, 2012 1	Tigres (Mexico)	4–0	(Nicaragua) Real Estelí	San Nicolás de los Garza, Mexico
21:00	Edno 35'; Navarro 42'; Guarch 80'; Rivas 90'	Report	Ronald Quintero (yellow card) 13'; Wilson (yellow card) 14'	Stadium: Estadio Universitario; Attendance: 31,650; Referee: (Canada) Paul Ward

August 22, 2012 2	Alajuelense (Costa Rica)	2–2	(Mexico) Tigres	Alajuela, Costa Rica
	Calvo 22'; Valle 90+1'		Zamora 40'; Viniegra 58'; Toledo (yellow card) 83'	Stadium: Estadio Alejandro Morera Soto

September 18, 2012 3	Real Estelí (Nicaragua)	1–1	(Mexico) Tigres	Estelí, Nicaragua
	Quintero (yellow card) 20'; Barrera 53' (yellow card) 76'; Rodríguez (yellow card) 55'; Lopez (yellow card) 80'		Dueñas (yellow card) 36'; Espericueta 89'; Acuña (yellow card) 90'	Stadium: Estadio Independencia

October 24, 2012 4	Tigres (Mexico)	5–0	(Costa Rica) Alajuelense	San Nicolás de los Garza, Mexico
	Hernández 6'; Juninho 25'; Pulido 34' 46' 59'; Ayala (yellow card) 69'			Stadium: Estadio Universitario

==== Quarterfinals ====
March 6, 2013 First leg	Tigres (Mexico)	1–0	(United States) Seattle Sounders FC	San Nicolás de los Garza, Mexico
21:00	Pulido 75'	Report		Stadium: Estadio Universitario; Referee: Jeffrey Solís

March 12, 2013 Second leg	Seattle Sounders FC (United States)	3–1 (3–2 agg.)	(Mexico) Tigres	Seattle, United States
21:00	Johnson (yellow card) 13', (goal) 75'; Alonso (yellow card) 47'; Yedlin 53'; Traoré 60'; Zakuani (yellow card) 81'; Gspurning (yellow card) 86'	Report	Hernández 23', (yellow card) 81'; Díaz de León (yellow card) 35'; Viniegra (yellow card) 37' (yellow-red card) 45'	Stadium: CenturyLink Field; Attendance: 20,520; Referee: Elmer Bonilla

=== Goals ===
R	Player	Position	Apertura	Clausura	Champions League	Total
1	(Argentina) Lucas Lobos	MF	6	6	0	12
2	(Argentina) Emanuel Villa	FW	0	8	0	8
2	(Mexico) Alan Pulido	FW	3	1	4	8
4	(Brazil) Juninho	DF	3	2	1	6
5	(Spain) Luis García	FW	2	3	0	5
6	(Mexico) Elías Hernández	FW	2	0	2	4
7	(Mexico) Alberto Acosta	MF	3	0	0	3
7	(Mexico) Manuel Viniegra	MF	2	0	1	3
7	(Mexico) Damián Álvarez	MF	1	2	0	3
10	(Mexico) Hugo Ayala	DF	1	0	0	1
10	(Brazil) Danilinho	MF	0	1	0	1
10	(Mexico) Fernando Navarro	DF	0	0	1	1
10	(Mexico) Taufic Guarch	FW	0	0	1	1
10	(Mexico) José Rivas	DF	0	0	1	1
10	(Mexico) Alonso Zamora	DF	0	0	1	1
10	(Mexico) Jorge Espericueta	MF	0	0	1	1
10	(Brazil) Edno	FW	0	0	1	1
Own goals			1	1	0	2
Total			24	24	14	62

Last updated: 02 Mar 2013
