= 2012 Primera División de México Clausura Liguilla =

2012 Mexican Primera División
Tournament details
- Country: Mexico
- Teams: 8

Final positions
- Champions: Santos
- Runners-up: Monterrey

Tournament statistics
- Matches played: 14
- Goals scored: 41 (2.93 per match)
- Top goal scorer(s): Oribe Peralta (6 goals)

The Liguilla (English: Little League) of the 2012 Mexican Primera División Clausura season is a final knockout tournament involving eight teams of the Mexican Primera División. The tournament began on May 2, 2012 with the first matches of the quarterfinals and ended on May 20, 2012 with the second leg of the final. The winners and runners-up of the competition will qualify for the 2012–13 CONCACAF Champions League.

Santos won the title.

== Teams ==
In a change from previous seasons, the 18 teams in the 2012 Clausura were not divided into three groups of six teams each. Instead, the eight best teams in the general table qualified for the competition.

S	Team	Manager	Captain	Performance at the 2012 Clausura							
S	Team	Manager	Captain	Pld	W	D	L	GF	GA	GD	Pts
1	Santos Laguna	(Mexico) Benjamín Galindo	(Mexico) Oswaldo Sánchez	17	11	3	3	33	18	+15	36
2	Monterrey	(Mexico) Víctor Manuel Vucetich	(Mexico) Luis Ernesto Pérez	17	9	5	3	32	15	+17	32
3	América	(Mexico) Miguel Herrera	(Argentina) Daniel Montenegro	17	9	5	3	30	26	+4	32
4	Morelia	(Mexico) Tomás Boy	(Argentina) Federico Vilar	17	9	4	4	25	18	+7	31
5	UANL	(Brazil) Ricardo Ferretti	(Argentina) Lucas Lobos	17	9	4	4	22	16	+6	31
6	Pachuca	(Mexico) Efraín Flores	(Mexico) Leobardo López	17	7	7	3	24	17	+7	28
7	Tijuana	(Argentina) Antonio Mohamed	(Argentina) Javier Gandolfi	17	7	7	3	18	11	+7	28
8	Chiapas	(Mexico) José Guadalupe Cruz	(Colombia) Jackson Martínez	17	8	3	6	26	20	+6	27

== Bracket ==
The eight qualified teams play two games against each other on a home-and-away basis. The winner of each match up is determined by aggregate score.

The teams were seeded one to eight in quarterfinals, and will be re-seeded one to four in semifinals, depending on their position in the general table. The higher seeded teams play on their home field during the second leg.

Quarterfinals
1	Santos Laguna	4	2	6
8	Chiapas	3	1	4
4	Morelia	0	1	1
5	UANL	1	4	5
2	Monterrey	2	2	4
7	Tijuana	1	2	3
3	América	3	0	3
6	Pachuca	1	1	2

Semifinals
1	Santos Laguna	1	2	3
5	UANL	1	2	3
2	Monterrey	0	2	2
3	América	0	0	0

Finals
1	Santos Laguna	1	2	3
2	Monterrey	1	1	2

- If the two teams are tied after both legs, the higher seeded team advances.
- Both finalists qualify to the 2012–13 CONCACAF Champions League Group Stage. Note that Santos are already qualified to 2012-13 Champions League as the runners-up of the Apertura, and as they win the Clausura final, they earn the spot given to the Clausura Champion and relinquish the spot for the Apertura Runner-up to Guadalajara, the best record of the 2011 Apertura not already qualified.

== Quarterfinals ==
The first legs of the quarterfinals were played on May 2 and 3. The second legs were played on May 5 and 6.

Team 1	Agg.	Team 2	1st leg	2nd leg
Chiapas (8)	4 – 6	(1) Santos Laguna	3 – 4	1 – 2
Tijuana (7)	3 – 4	(2) Monterrey	1 – 2	2 – 2
Pachuca (6)	2 – 3	(3) América	1 – 3	1 – 0
UANL (5)	5 – 1	(4) Morelia	1 – 0	4 – 1

Kickoffs are given in local time (UTC-5 unless stated otherwise).

=== First leg ===
May 2, 2012	Pachuca	1 – 3	América	Pachuca, Hidalgo
20:30	López 77' (pen.)	Report	Molina 38'; Bermúdez 42', 59'	Stadium: Estadio Hidalgo; Referee: Erim Ramírez

May 2, 2012	Tijuana	1 – 2	Monterrey	Tijuana, Baja California
20:30 PDT	Enríquez 88'	Report	Zavala 31'; Reyna 49'	Stadium: Estadio Caliente; Referee: Jorge Pérez

May 3, 2012	Chiapas	3 – 4	Santos Laguna	Tuxtla Gutiérrez, Chiapas
19:00	Rey 29'; Martínez 32', 74'	Report	Ludueña 25', 60'; Peralta 39'; Quintero 90+6'	Stadium: Estadio Víctor Manuel Reyna; Referee: José Peñaloza

May 3, 2012	UANL	1 – 0	Morelia	San Nicolás de los Garza, Nuevo León
21:00	Mancilla 23'	Report		Stadium: Estadio Universitario; Referee: Jorge Rojas

=== Second leg ===
May 5, 2012	América	0 – 1	Pachuca	Santa Ursula, Mexico City
18:00		Report	Herrera 36'	Stadium: Estadio Azteca; Referee: Marco Rodríguez

May 5, 2012	Monterrey	2 – 2	Tijuana	Monterrey, Nuevo León
20:00	Delgado 44'; Basanta 65'; Reyna (yellow card) 27' (yellow-red card) 31'	Report	Arévalo 9', 61' (pen.); Almazán (red card) 51'; Pulido (red card) 73'	Stadium: Estadio Tecnológico; Referee: Ricardo Arellano

May 6, 2012	Santos Laguna	2 – 1	Chiapas	Torreón, Coahuila
18:00	Quintero 15'; Peralta 37'	Report	Zamorano 7'	Stadium: Estadio TSM Corona; Referee: Roberto García

May 6, 2012	Morelia	1 – 4	UANL	Morelia, Michoacán
20:00	Sabah 86'	Report	Ayala 64'; Lobos 74'; Edno 76'; Hernández 90+1'	Stadium: Estadio Morelos; Referee: Mauricio Morales

== Semi-finals ==
The first legs of the semifinals were played on May 9 and 10. The second legs were played on May 12 and 13.

Team 1	Agg.	Team 2	1st leg	2nd leg
UANL (5)	3 – 3	(1) Santos Laguna	1 – 1	2 – 2
América (3)	0 – 2	(2) Monterrey	0 – 0	0 – 2

Kickoffs are given in local time (UTC-5 unless stated otherwise).

=== First leg ===
May 9, 2012	América	0 – 0	Monterrey	Santa Ursula, Mexico City
21:00	Aguilar (yellow card) 42' (yellow-red card) 83'	Report		Stadium: Estadio Azteca; Referee: Mauricio Morales

May 10, 2012	UANL	1 – 1	Santos Laguna	San Nicolás de los Garza, Nuevo León
20:00	Lobos 69'	Report	Estrada 62'	Stadium: Estadio Universitario; Referee: Francisco Chacón

=== Second leg ===
May 12, 2012	Monterrey	2 – 0	América	Monterrey, Nuevo León
21:00	Basanta 9' de Nigris 52'	Report		Stadium: Estadio Tecnológico; Referee: Roberto García

May 13, 2012	Santos Laguna	2 – 2	UANL	Torreón, Coahuila
20:00	Peralta 87', 90'	Report	Mancilla 6', 27'	Stadium: Estadio TSM Corona; Referee: Marco Rodríguez

== Final ==
The first leg of the final was played on May 17. The second leg was played on May 20.

Team 1	Agg.	Team 2	1st leg	2nd leg
(2) Monterrey	2 - 3	(1) Santos Laguna	1 - 1	1 - 2

Kickoffs are given in local time (UTC-5 unless stated otherwise).

=== First leg ===
May 17, 2012	Monterrey	1 – 1	Santos Laguna	Monterrey, Nuevo León
21:00	Suazo 90+4' (pen.)	Report	Peralta 70'	Stadium: Estadio Tecnológico; Referee: Mauricio Morales

=== Second leg ===
May 20, 2012	Santos Laguna	2 – 1	Monterrey	Torreón, Coahuila
20:00	Ludueña 6'; Peralta 65'	Report	de Nigris 79'	Stadium: Estadio TSM Corona; Referee: Roberto García

2012 Clausura winners:

Santos Laguna
4th Title
