= Jorge Padilla =

Jorge Padilla may refer to:

- Jorge Padilla (baseball) (born 1979), Puerto Rican baseball player
- Jorge Padilla (footballer, born 1993), Mexican football defender
- Jorge Padilla (footballer, born 2001), Spanish football forward
