= Ismael Sosa =

Argentine footballer (born 1987)

Victor Ismael Sosa
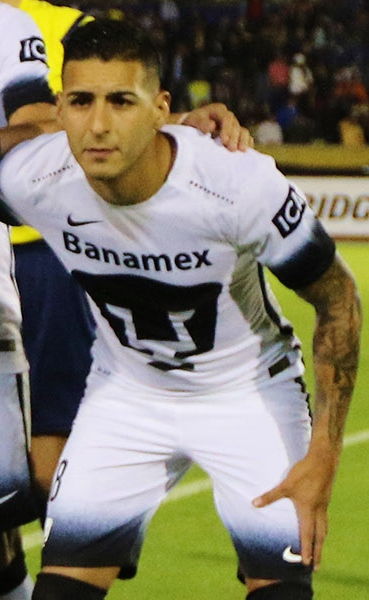
- Sosa with UNAM

Personal information
- Full name: Victor Ismael Sosa
- Date of birth: January 18, 1987 (age 39)
- Place of birth: San Martín, Buenos Aires, Argentina
- Height: 1.77 m (5 ft 10 in)
- Position: Forward

Youth career
- 1998–2004: Independiente

Senior career*
Years	Team	Apps	(Gls)
2005–2010	Independiente	80	(13)
2006	→ San Martín SJ (loan)	8	(1)
2009–2010	Argentinos Juniors	34	(12)
2010–2012	Gaziantepspor	74	(8)
2013–2014	Universidad Católica	33	(17)
2014–2016	UNAM	92	(29)
2016–2019	UANL	80	(15)
2019–2021	Pachuca	65	(7)
2019–2020	→ León (loan)	26	(10)
2022–2023	Everton	26	(2)
2023–2025	Ñublense	43	(4)
2025	Argentinos Juniors	25	(1)

International career
2007	Argentina U20	17	(3)
- * Club domestic league appearances and goals as of 17:11, 22 December 2025 (UTC)

Víctor Ismael Sosa (born 18 January 1987) is an Argentine professional footballer.

Nicknamed Chuco, Sosa is a dynamic forward who can play as either a striker, second striker or winger, due to his ability to score and assist goals. He holds a Mexican passport.

== Club career ==
=== Independiente ===
Sosa began his playing career in 2005 with Independiente. He made his league debut on 20 March 2005 in a 2–1 away defeat to Boca Juniors. In 2006, he had a loan spell with San Martín de San Juan but returned to the Independiente where he played until 2009 making 80 league appearances and scoring 13 goals.

During the 2009 winter transfer window he joined Argentinos Juniors under new manager Claudio Borghi where he started well with 3 goals in his first 6 games for the club. His good form in the Apertura 2009 helped the club to a creditable 6th-place finish and in the Clausura 2010 he was the top scorer for the club with 9 goals in 17 appearances helping the club to win the Primera División for the first time since 1985.

=== Gaziantepspor ===
Sosa was given the number 18 shirt at Kamil Ocak Stadium. He made his first Süper Lig appearance on 13 July 2010, in Gaziantepspor's fourth game of the season, in the match away to Kasımpaşa. Sosa scored his first league goal for Gaziantepspor against Bucaspor.

=== Universidad Católica ===
On 7 January 2013, Sosa joined Universidad Católica, where he witnessed one of the magical nights of South American football, when Rogério Ceni became a "myth" in Chile

=== Pumas UNAM ===
On December 26, 2013, Sosa was transferred to Mexican club Club Universidad Nacional. He had limited game time in his first tournament, scoring just 2 goals, but the return of Memo Vazquez saw an increase in opportunities resulting in an increased goal tally year on year. Sosa scored 5 goals in his second tournament with the club and found the net 7 times in his third tournament, the Clausera 2015. The Apertura 2015 saw Sosa become the star man for Pumas and became only the 5th pumas player to score 10 or more goals in the short tournament format, scoring 10 goals. He also added 7 assists during the regular season. On December 9, 2015 Club Universidad Nacional tied Sosa down for another three years to the club.

For the Clausura 2016 tournament Sosa scored a brace in the first home game of the season in a 3–2 win over Deportivo Toluca. He also scored in the first game of the 2016 Copa Libertadores, opening the scoring in the first minute against Emelec. A fine run of form in the Copa Libertadores saw Sosa scoring again in a 0–2 victory at Olimpia followed by a brace against Deportivo Tachira in Ciudad Universitaria.

=== Tigres UANL ===
On 18 June 2016, Sosa arrived to Monterrey to join Tigres UANL. On 10 July, he made his debut as a starter playing against Pachuca FC in the 2016 Campeón de Campeones Cup. He scored the winning goal at 25' after a cross from Javier Aquino giving Tigres their first Campeón de Campeones championship. He scored his first goal with Tigres in Liga MX on July 30, 2016, the final goal of the 3–0 victory over América at the Estadio Azteca.

== International career ==
Sosa was picked to join the Argentina Under-20 squad for the 2007 South American Youth Championship in Paraguay.

== Honours ==
=== Club ===
Argentinos Juniors

- Primera División Argentina: 2010 Clausura

UANL

- Liga MX: 2016 Apertura, 2017 Apertura
- Campeón de Campeones: 2016, 2017, 2018
- Campeones Cup: 2018
