= Francisco Acuña =

Mexican footballer (born 1988)

Personal information
- Full name: Francisco Javier Acuña Víctor
- Date of birth: 19 January 1988 (age 38)
- Place of birth: Hermosillo, Sonora, Mexico
- Height: 1.67 m (5 ft 6 in)
- Position: Midfielder

Youth career
- 2007–2008: Tigres UANL

Senior career*
Years	Team	Apps	(Gls)
2008–2012	Tigres UANL	55	(7)
2008–2009	→ UANL Premier	8	(0)
2013	→ San Luis (loan)	10	(0)
2013	→ Atlante (loan)	0	(0)
2014	→ Morelia (loan)	2	(0)
2014–2019	Puebla	71	(6)
2015–2016	→ BUAP (loan)	10	(1)
2020	Atlético Ottawa	7	(2)
2021	Necaxa	1	(0)
2021–2024	Sonora	95	(12)
- * Club domestic league appearances and goals as of 17 April 2024

Francisco Javier Acuña Víctor (born 19 January 1988) is a former Mexican professional footballer who played as a midfielder.

== Club career ==
=== UANL ===
Acuña developed with the youth squads of Tigres UANL. In 2008, he made his debut with the reserves in the Primera División A, making eight appearances that season. He later made his Mexican Primera División debut for UANL on 19 October 2008 as a substitute in a 4–1 win over Monterrey, and scored his first professional goal in the 90th minute of the same match. He also made two appearances for UANL in the 2009 InterLiga.

In the 2009–10 season, Acuña made ten league appearances, scoring two goals. The following year, he played his first full season of professional football, making 27 league appearances and scoring four goals. He also appeared in the second leg of UANL's Clausura Liguilla series against Guadalajara.

In the 2011–12 season, Acuña saw a sharp reduction in playing time, making only seven league appearances and two in the Copa Libertadores, as well as one appearance in the Apertura Liguilla against Pachuca. In the first half of the 2012–13 season, he made two league appearances and two appearances in CONCACAF Champions League before being loaned out until the end of the season.

==== Loan to San Luis ====
On 6 December 2012, Acuña was loaned to San Luis until the end of the season. He made ten league appearances and three in the Copa Mexico for San Luis that year.

==== Loan to Morelia ====
In 2014, he went on loan to Monarcas Morelia, where he made two league appearances and one in the Copa Libertadores that season.

=== Atlético Ottawa ===
On 30 March 2020, Acuña signed with Canadian Premier League side Atlético Ottawa. He made his debut in Ottawa's inaugural match on August 15 against York9.

=== Necaxa ===
On 5 January 2021, Acuña returned to Mexico, signing with Liga MX side Necaxa.

== Personal life ==
Acuña was nicknamed "El Messi" throughout his career, a nickname he would later say generated unrealistic high expectations.

== Career statistics ==
As of 5 January 2021

Club statistics
Club	Season	League			National cup (Note: Includes Interliga and Copa MX)		Continental (Note: Includes North American Superliga, Copa Libertadores and CONCACAF Champions League)		Other (Note: Includes Liga MX Liguilla)		Total	
Club	Season	Division	Apps	Goals	Apps	Goals	Apps	Goals	Apps	Goals	Apps	Goals
UANL Premier	2008–09	Primera División A	8	0	—		—		—		8	0
Tigres UANL	2008–09	Mexican Primera División	9	1	—		—		—		9	1
Tigres UANL	2009–10	Mexican Primera División	10	2	2	0	2	0	—		14	2
Tigres UANL	2010–11	Mexican Primera División	27	4	—		—		1	0	28	4
Tigres UANL	2011–12	Mexican Primera División	7	0	—		2	0	1	0	10	0
Tigres UANL	2012–13	Liga MX	2	0	—		2	0	—		4	0
Tigres UANL	Total		55	7	2	0	6	0	2	0	65	7
San Luis (loan)	2012–13	Liga MX	10	0	3	0	—		—		13	0
Morelia (loan)	2013–14	Liga MX	2	0	—		1	0	—		3	0
Puebla	2014–15	Liga MX	2	1	7	0	—		—		9	1
Puebla	2016–17	Liga MX	15	1	2	0	—		—		17	1
Puebla	2017–18	Liga MX	30	3	4	0	—		—		34	3
Puebla	2018–19	Liga MX	21	1	9	1	—		—		30	2
Puebla	2019–20	Liga MX	3	0	4	0	—		—		7	0
Puebla	Total		71	6	26	1	0	0	0	0	97	7
BUAP (loan)	2015–16	Ascenso MX	15	2	10	4	—		—		25	6
BUAP (loan)	2016–17	Ascenso MX	10	1	5	0	—		—		15	1
BUAP (loan)	Total		25	3	15	4	0	0	0	0	40	7
Atlético Ottawa	2020	Canadian Premier League	7	2	—		—		—		7	2
Career total			178	18	46	5	7	0	2	0	233	23

== Honours ==
Tigres UANL

- Mexican Primera División: Apertura 2011
