= 2017 Campeón de Campeones =

- Match programme cover
- Event: 2017 Campeón de Campeones
UANL	Guadalajara
1	0
- Date: 16 July 2017
- Venue: StubHub Center, Carson, California, United States
- Referee: Oscar Macías Romo (Aguascalientes)
- Attendance: 25,667

The 2017 Campeón de Campeones was the 45th edition of the Campeón de Campeones, an annual football super cup match. (Note: The edition number was calculated based on figures provided by Goal.com, with the first Campeón de Campeones having been held in 1941–42.) It was played on 16 July 2017 between Apertura 2016 winners Tigres UANL and Clausura 2017 winners Guadalajara. Like the previous editions, the 2017 Campeón de Campeones was contested in a single-leg format at a neutral venue in the United States. This year's match took place at the StubHub Center in Carson, California for the second straight year.

The 2017 Campeón de Campeones was part of a doubleheader, which also includes the 2017 Supercopa MX, organized by Univision Deportes, Soccer United Marketing (SUM), Liga MX and LA Galaxy.

Tigres UANL won the match 1–0 to secure their second consecutive Campeón de Campeones title, defending the title they had won the previous year.

== Match details ==
16 July 2017
19:45 (UTC−08:00)

UANL	1–0	Guadalajara
Vargas 62'	Report

StubHub Center, Carson
Attendance: 25,667
Referee: Oscar Macías Romo (Aguascalientes)

UANL	Guadalajara

GK	1	(Argentina) Nahuel Guzmán
DF	6	(Mexico) Jorge Torres Nilo	(yellow card) 77'
DF	3	(Brazil) Juninho (c)	(yellow card) 80'
DF	14	(Mexico) Jorge Iván Estrada		(substituted off) 89'
DF	2	(Mexico) Israel Jiménez		(substituted off) 82'
MF	25	(Mexico) Jürgen Damm	(yellow card) 26'
MF	20	(Mexico) Javier Aquino
MF	8	(Argentina) Lucas Zelarayán
MF	18	(Argentina) Ismael Sosa	(yellow card) 39'	(substituted off) 53'
FW	9	(Chile) Eduardo Vargas
FW	10	(France) André-Pierre Gignac
Substitutions:
GK	22	(Mexico) Enrique Palos
DF	23	(Mexico) Jair Díaz		(substituted on) 89'
MF	11	(Mexico) Damián Álvarez	(yellow card) 83'	(substituted on) 53'
MF	16	(Mexico) Raúl Torres
MF	17	(United States) Jose Francisco Torres		(substituted on) 82'
MF	27	(Mexico) Alberto Acosta
FW	35	(Mexico) Rafael Durán
Manager:
(Brazil) Ricardo Ferretti

GK	30	(Mexico) Rodolfo Cota
DF	6	(Mexico) Edwin Hernández
DF	3	(Mexico) Carlos Salcido (c)
DF	2	(Mexico) Oswaldo Alanís		(substituted off) 27'
DF	17	(Mexico) Jesús Sánchez
MF	23	(Mexico) José Juan Vázquez		(substituted off) 27'
MF	25	(Mexico) Michael Pérez
MF	18	(Mexico) Ángel López
MF	21	(Mexico) Carlos Fierro
FW	99	(Mexico) Kevin Magaña		(substituted off) 60'
FW	14	(Mexico) Ángel Zaldívar	(yellow card) 51'
Substitutions:
GK	34	(Mexico) Miguel Jiménez
DF	28	(Mexico) Miguel Basulto		(substituted on) 27'
MF	10	(Mexico) Javier Eduardo López
MF	288	(Mexico) Fernando Beltrán		(substituted on) 27'
MF	302	(Mexico) Edson Torres
FW	15	(Mexico) Michelle Benítez
FW	292	(Mexico) José Juan Macías		(substituted on) 60'
Manager:
(Argentina) Matías Almeyda

Assistant referees:
Salvador Rodríguez Gorrocino (Jalisco)
Andres Hernández Delgado (Mexico City)
Fourth official:
Marco Antonio Ortiz (Durango)
