= Juninho (footballer, born September 1982) =

Brazilian footballer

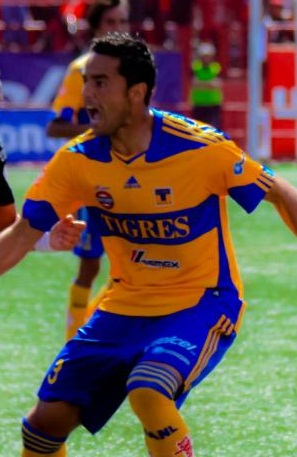
- Juninho with UANL in 2011

Personal information
- Full name: Anselmo Vendrechovski Júnior
- Date of birth: September 16, 1982 (age 44)
- Place of birth: Wenceslau Braz, Paraná, Brazil
- Height: 1.81 m (5 ft 11 in)
- Position: Centre back

Youth career
- 2000–2001: Coritiba

Senior career*
Years	Team	Apps	(Gls)
2002–2004	Coritiba	13	(0)
2005–2007	Botafogo	64	(14)
2008	São Paulo	8	(0)
2009–2010	Botafogo	34	(7)
2010	→ Suwon Bluewings (loan)	11	(3)
2010–2018	UANL	288	(31)
Total		418	(55)

Managerial career
- 2020: UANL Reserves and Academy
- 2020–2021: UANL (assistant)
- 2023: UANL (assistant)
- * Club domestic league appearances and goals

Anselmo Vendrechovski Júnior (September 16, 1982), known as Juninho, is a Brazilian former professional footballer. He is a Mexican naturalized citizen.

A centre back, Juninho was known for his quality and leadership. The former captain of Tigres UANL, was a set-piece specialist with a powerful right shot and ability to score goals.

After his retirement, he stayed attached to Tigres and worked with the youth teams and with the first team's head coach Ricardo Ferretti between 2020 and 2021. In February 9, 2023, he joined as an assistant for at the time head coach Marco Antonio Ruiz.

== Career ==
His great-grandparents were from Poland. He spent his early career with Coritiba. On 2005, he was signed by Botafogo. He was transferred in 2008 to São Paulo after accepting a three-year offer on December 7, 2007. In January 2009, he was released to sign back with his former club Botafogo, but Tigres UANL from Mexico offered him a better contract, and since 2010 he has played in Mexico. In early 2010 he played for Suwon Bluewings on loan. His first goal with Tigres was against Santos Laguna on a free kick in the 8th minute. This was the only goal of the game as it ended 1 - 0 for a Tigres' win. He became a key in the defense for the Apertura 2011, Apertura 2015, Apertura 2016 and Apertura 2017 championships of Tigres. After the departure of Lucas Lobos, he became the team's captain. Juninho retired at the end of the Apertura 2018 season and began a coaching role at Tigres' youth teams. Juninho joined the Monterrey Flash of the Major Arena Soccer League in June 2022. Nowadays, he works with Tigres' head coach Marco Antonio Ruiz.

== Honours ==
=== Club ===
Coritiba

- Paraná State League (2): 2003, 2004

Botafogo

- Rio de Janeiro State League (1): 2006
- Taça Rio (1): 2007
- Taça Guanabara (1): 2009

São Paulo

- Brazilian Série A (1): 2008

Tigres UANL

- Liga MX (4): Apertura 2011, Apertura 2015, Apertura 2016, Apertura 2017
- Copa MX (1): Clausura 2014
- Campeón de Campeones (3): 2016, 2017, 2018
- Campeones Cup (1): 2018
