= 2016 Campeón de Campeones =

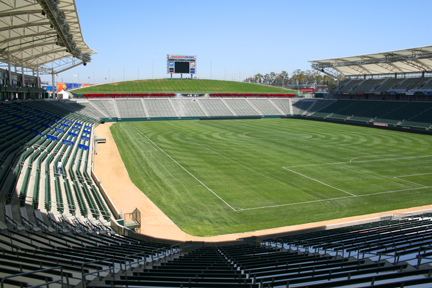
- StubHub Center, host of the match
- Event: 2016 Supercopa MX
UANL	Pachuca
1	0
- Date: 10 July 2016
- Venue: StubHub Center, Carson, California, United States
- Referee: Ricardo Salazar (United States)
- Attendance: 27,132

The 2016 Campeón de Campeones was the 44th edition of the Campeón de Campeones, an annual football super cup match. (Note: The edition number was calculated based on figures provided by Goal.com, with the first Campeón de Campeones having been held in 1941–42.) It was played on 10 July 2016 between Apertura 2015 winners Tigres UANL and Clausura 2016 winners Pachuca. Like the 2015 edition, the 2016 Campeón de Campeones consisted of one match at a neutral venue in the United States. The match took place at the StubHub Center in Carson, California.

The 2016 Campeón de Campeones was part of a doubleheader, which also included the 2016 Supercopa MX, organized by Univision Deportes, Soccer United Marketing (SUM), and Liga MX.

Tigres UANL won the match 1–0 to secure their first Campeón de Campeones title.

== Match details ==
10 July 2016
18:06

UANL	1–0	Pachuca
Sosa 25'	Report

StubHub Center, Carson
Attendance: 27,132
Referee: Ricardo Salazar (United States)

UANL	Pachuca

GK	1	(Argentina) Nahuel Guzmán	(yellow card) 56'
DF	6	(Mexico) Jorge Torres Nilo
DF	3	(Brazil) Juninho (c)
DF	4	(Mexico) Hugo Ayala		(substituted off) 89'
DF	2	(Mexico) Israel Jiménez		(substituted off) 68'
MF	19	(Argentina) Guido Pizarro	(red card) 56'
MF	29	(Mexico) Jesús Dueñas	(yellow card) 50'
MF	11	(Mexico) Damián Álvarez
MF	20	(Mexico) Javier Aquino	(yellow card) 45'
MF	8	(Argentina) Lucas Zelarrayán		(substituted off) 60'
FW	18	(Argentina) Ismael Sosa
Substitutions:
GK	22	(Mexico) Enrique Palos
DF	24	(Mexico) José Arturo Rivas
MF	15	(Mexico) Manuel Viniegra		(substituted on) 60'
MF	17	(United States) José Francisco Torres		(substituted on) 68'
MF	23	(Colombia) Luis Quiñones	(yellow card) 90+4'	(substituted on) 89'
MF	28	(Mexico) Luis Alfonso Rodríguez
FW	5	(Paraguay) Fernando Fernández
Manager:
(Brazil) Ricardo Ferretti

GK	21	(Mexico) Óscar Pérez
DF	4	(United States) Omar Gonzalez	(yellow card) 72'
DF	33	(Colombia) Stefan Medina	(yellow card) 26'
DF	6	(Mexico) Raúl López		(substituted off) 77'
DF	12	(Mexico) Emmanuel García
MF	7	(Mexico) Rodolfo Pizarro
MF	16	(Mexico) Jorge Hernández	(yellow card) 87'
MF	15	(Mexico) Erick Gutiérrez (c)		(substituted off) 70'
MF	10	(Uruguay) Jonathan Urretaviscaya		(substituted off) 82'
FW	8	(Mexico) Hirving Lozano
FW	29	(Argentina) Franco Jara
Substitutions:
GK	13	(Mexico) Alfonso Blanco
DF	3	(Mexico) José Esquivel
MF	5	(Mexico) Víctor Guzmán
MF	11	(Argentina) Rubén Botta	(red card) 81'	(substituted on) 77'
MF	26	(Mexico) Erick Aguirre
FW	9	(Brazil) Mateus Gonçalves		(substituted on) 82'
FW	19	(Colombia) Wilson Morelo		(substituted on) 70'
Manager:
(Uruguay) Diego Alonso

Assistant referees:
Joshua Haimes (United States)
Brandon Major (United States)
Fourth official:
Denis Vargas (United States)
