= Alberto Acosta (Mexican footballer) =

Mexican footballer (born 1988)

Personal information
- Full name: Alberto Joshimar Acosta Alvarado
- Date of birth: 26 February 1988 (age 38)
- Place of birth: Mante, Tamaulipas, Mexico
- Height: 1.70 m (5 ft 7 in)
- Position: Left-back

Youth career
- 2007–2008: Manzanillo
- 2008–2010: Tigres UANL

Senior career*
| Years | Team | Apps | (Gls) |
| 2010–2019 | Tigres UANL | 94 | (5) |
| 2014 | → Pachuca (loan) | 1 | (0) |
| 2014–2016 | → Puebla (loan) | 38 | (1) |
| 2019 | → Morelia (loan) | 9 | (1) |
| 2019–2023 | Juárez | 67 | (0) |
- * Club domestic league appearances and goals as of 23 April 2023

Alberto Joshimar Acosta Alvarado (Note: In this Spanish name, the first or paternal surname is Acosta and the second or maternal family name is Alvarado.) (born 26 February 1988) is a Mexican professional footballer who plays as a left-back.

== Club career ==
Acosta was discovered while playing with Fútbol Soccer Manzanillo in the Segunda División de México and debuted with the first team in the Apertura 2010 Tournament. On October 20, 2012, Acosta scored his first hat-trick in the victory of 5–0 over Pumas UNAM. Acosta returned with Tigres for the Apertura 2016.

== Honours ==
Tigres UANL

- Liga MX: Apertura 2011, Apertura 2016, Apertura 2017
- Campeón de Campeones: 2016, 2017, 2018
