= Enrique Palos =

Mexican footballer (born 1986)

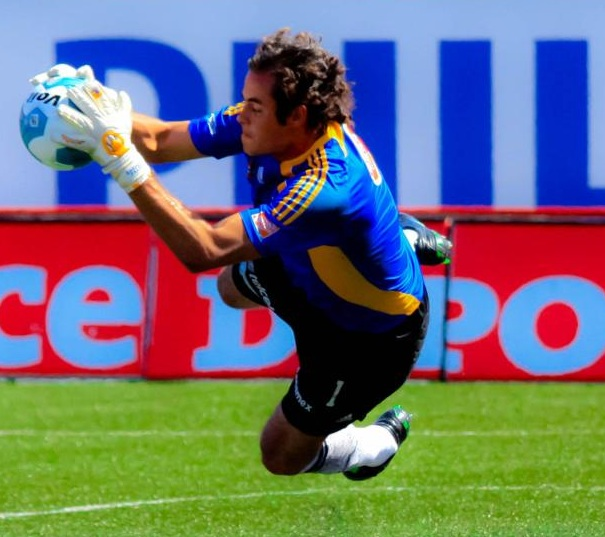
- Palos playing for Tigres

Personal information
- Full name: Enrique Eduardo Palos Reyes
- Date of birth: 31 May 1986 (age 40)
- Place of birth: Aguascalientes City, Mexico
- Height: 1.90 m (6 ft 3 in)
- Position: Goalkeeper

Team information
- Current team: Tigres U-23 (goalkeeping coach)

Youth career
- Tigres

Senior career*
Years	Team	Apps	(Gls)
2005–2017	Tigres	131	(0)
2018–2021	Juárez	63	(0)

Managerial career
- 2022: Necaxa Reserves and Academy
- 2023–: Tigres Reserves and Academy
- * Club domestic league appearances and goals

Enrique Eduardo Palos Reyes (Note: In this Spanish name, the first or paternal surname is Palos and the second or maternal family name is Reyes.) (born 31 May 1986) is a Mexican former professional footballer who played as a goalkeeper.

== Club career ==
=== Tigres ===
Palos has spent most of his career as 2nd/3rd goalkeeper until he was given a starting opportunity by Ricardo Ferretti and benching Cirilo Saucedo in 2011. Since then he has become a regular starter on the team for most of the following games. Beginning in Apertura 2014, Palos was demoted to Tigres' backup goalkeeper after Tigres signed Argentina National Football Team player Nahuel Guzman.

== Honours ==
Tigres UANL

- Liga MX: Apertura 2011, Apertura 2015, Apertura 2016, Apertura 2017
- Copa MX: Clausura 2014
- Campeón de Campeones: 2016, 2017
- SuperLiga: 2009

Individual

- Liga MX Best Goalkeeper of the tournament: Apertura 2011
