= Paolo Medina =

Mexican footballer (born 1999)

Personal information
- Full name: Paolo Medina Etienne
- Date of birth: 28 May 1999 (age 27)
- Place of birth: Orizaba, Veracruz, Mexico
- Height: 1.75 m (5 ft 9 in)
- Position: Right-back

Youth career
- 2007–2009: Alcobendas
- 2009–2017: Real Madrid
- 2017–2018: Benfica
- 2018–2019: Monterrey

Senior career*
Years	Team	Apps	(Gls)
2019–2020	Morelia	2	(0)
2020–2021	Panetolikos	16	(0)
2021–2022	Logroñés	23	(0)
2022–2024	Hermannstadt	25	(0)
2024–2025	Unirea Slobozia	24	(0)
2025–2026	León	0	(0)

International career
2015	Mexico U16	1	(1)
2017	Mexico U18	1	(0)
- * Club domestic league appearances and goals as of 18 July 2025

Paolo Medina Etienne (born 28 May 1999) is a Mexican professional footballer who plays as a right-back.

== Club career ==
=== Early career ===
Born in Orizaba in the Mexican state of Veracruz, Medina moved to Spain at the age of two, and joined the academy of Alcobendas in 2007. After a couple of seasons he joined Real Madrid, where he initially started as a winger, before moving to full-back. During his time with Los Blancos he struggled with injury, suffering a five-month lay off at the end of 2016.

Despite this, he was seen as a very highly rated prospect in the Real Madrid academy, and in October 2016 he was named by English newspaper The Guardian as one of the best players born in 1999 worldwide. He was also nominated for the 2017 Golden Boy - a prestigious award given by Italian sports newspaper Tuttosport to the best young footballer playing in Europe.

At the conclusion of the 2016–17 season, Medina announced his departure from Real Madrid, before joining Portuguese side Benfica shortly after. This move was seen as somewhat of a shock in media, given Medina's potential, but the defender was quoted as saying "Many will think that it is a step backwards, but I really see the opposite... I think it has been the best decision I could have made in my career" upon signing.

=== Return to Mexico ===
His spell with Benfica did not last long, and after just one season, he had returned to Mexico, going on trial with Monterrey. He signed a contract with Monterrey in July 2018, but joined fellow-Liga MX side Morelia a year later. Having not started in the first half of the season, Medina was handed his league debut by manager Pablo Guede in early 2020, starting in a 1–0 loss to Deportivo Toluca. However, by March he had fallen out of favour again, before the season was curtailed due to the COVID-19 pandemic in Mexico.

=== Later career ===
In August 2020, Greek Super League side Panetolikos announced the signing of Medina on a three-year contract. However, after just a year, he had fallen out of favour with manager Giannis Anastasiou, and was linked with a move to Xanthi. Instead he returned to Spain, where he joined Primera División RFEF side Logroñés on a one-year deal.

Having not renewed his contract with Logroñés, Medina moved to Romania, signing with Hermannstadt. After two seasons with Hermannstadt, he mutually agreed to terminate his contract with the club. He joined newly promoted Unirea Slobozia in May 2024.

After a year at Unirea Slobozia, Medina left the club at the end of his contract. In July 2025, he signed with Club León, a Liga MX team.

== International career ==
Medina represented Mexico on at least one occasion at under-16 level, scoring in a 3–1 win against Turkey in the 2015 edition of the Montaigu Tournament. He played in at least one game with the under-18 team two years later, in 2017.

== Career statistics ==
=== Club ===
As of 9 May 2025

Appearances and goals by club, season and competition
Club	Season	League			Cup (Note: Includes Copa MX, Greek Cup and Cupa României)		Other		Total	
Club	Season	Division	Apps	Goals	Apps	Goals	Apps	Goals	Apps	Goals
Morelia	2019–20	Liga MX	2	0	5	0	—		7	0
Panetolikos	2020–21	Super League Greece	16	0	1	0	—		17	0
Logroñés	2021–22	Primera División RFEF	23	0	—		—		23	0
Hermannstadt	2022–23	Liga I	11	0	4	0	—		15	0
Hermannstadt	2023–24	Liga I	14	0	3	0	—		17	0
Hermannstadt	Total		25	0	7	0	0	0	32	0
Unirea Slobozia	2024–25	Liga I	24	0	0	0	0	0	24	0
Career total			90	0	13	0	0	0	103	0
