= David Toledo =

Mexican footballer (born 1982)

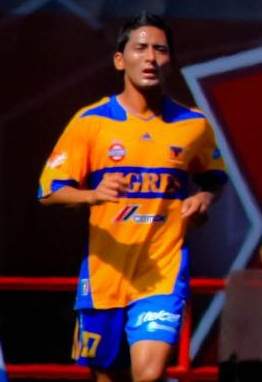
- Toledo playing for Tigres UANL

Personal information
- Full name: José David Toledo Bosquez
- Date of birth: 18 April 1982 (age 44)
- Place of birth: Juchitán, Oaxaca, Mexico
- Height: 1.67 m (5 ft 5 1/2 in)
- Position: Midfielder

Senior career*
Years	Team	Apps	(Gls)
2001–2009	UNAM	86	(6)
2005	→ Altamira (loan)	2	(0)
2007–2008	→ Atlante (loan)	33	(3)
2009–2013	Tigres UANL	85	(2)
2013–2014	Chiapas	57	(2)
2014–2015	Guadalajara	18	(0)
2015–2017	Puebla	66	(1)
2018	Oaxaca	16	(1)
- * Club domestic league appearances and goals as of 17 February 2018

José David Toledo Bosquez (Note: In this Spanish name, the first or paternal surname is Toledo and the second or maternal family name is Bosquez.) (born 18 April 1982) is a Mexican former professional footballer who played as a midfielder. He has played in clubs such as Pumas UNAM, Altamira, Atlante, Tigres, Chiapas, Querétaro, Guadalajara, Puebla, and Oaxaca.

== Club career ==
=== Pumas UNAM ===
Toledo started his professional career with Pumas UNAM in 2001. He made over 80 Primera Division appearances for Pumas.

=== Altamira ===
In 2005, Toledo was sent out on loan to Altamira. He only made two league appearances during his loan spell.

=== Atlante ===
In the 2007–08 Toledo played on loan at Atlante F.C. His first goal in the league for the club came on 1 September 2007 in a 2–2 draw with Santos Laguna. He scored the equalizing goal in the 79th minute, 12 minutes after teammate Giancarlo Maldonado had pulled one back for Atlante.

=== Tigres ===
In July 2009, Toledo was sold to Tigres UANL for an undisclosed fee. In 85 league appearances, spanning over four years, Toledo scored twice. His first goal came in a 2–2 draw on 30 January 2010 against Chiapas. He scored in the 51st minute, grabbing one back for Tigres.

=== Chiapas ===
Toledo left Tigres for Chiapas at the beginning of 2013. He was loaned back to the club after his transfer to Querétaro.

=== Queretaro ===
Querétaro purchased Toledo from Chiapas in 2013, but immediately loaned him back to his former club. He never appeared in the league during his tenure at Querétaro.

=== Guadalajara ===
Toledo plays for Guadalajara in the Primera Division de Mexico, following his transfer from Querétaro on 4 June 2014. Toledo made his league debut for his new club on 20 July 2014 in a 1–1 draw with Chiapas. He was subbed off after 60 minutes.

=== Puebla ===
In the summer of 2015, Toledo went out on loan to Puebla. In his two-year loan, he made 51 league appearances, scoring once. That lone goal came in a 3–0 win on 19 February 2017 against his former club Chiapas. It came from the penalty spot in the 62nd minute.

=== Oaxaca ===
In January 2018, Toledo moved to Alebrijes de Oaxaca in the Ascenso MX. He scored his first goal in the league in a 3–0 victory on 13 January 2018 against Correcaminos UAT. It came from the penalty spot in the 16th minute.

== Honours ==
Atlante

- Primera División de México: Apertura 2007

UNAM

- Primera División de México: Clausura 2004, Apertura 2004, Clausura 2009

Tigres UANL

- Primera División de México: Apertura 2011
