= Abraham Stringel =

Mexican footballer (born 1988)

Personal information
- Full name: Abraham Stringel Vallejo
- Date of birth: 3 May 1988 (age 38)
- Place of birth: Mexico City, Mexico
- Height: 1.73 m (5 ft 8 in)
- Position: Defender

Senior career*
Years	Team	Apps	(Gls)
2008–2017	Tigres UANL	0	(0)
2008–2009	→ Indios (loan)	10	(1)
2009–2011	→ Correcaminos UAT (loan)	31	(0)
2013	→ Estudiantes Tecos (loan)	7	(1)
2014	→ Atlético San Luis (loan)	8	(0)
2014	→ Venados (loan)	8	(0)
2015	→ Celaya (loan)	6	(0)
2015–2016	→ Cimarrones de Sonora (loan)	15	(0)
2017	Alianza Petrolera	28	(0)
- * Club domestic league appearances and goals as of 7 January 2017

Abraham Stringel Vallejo (born May 3, 1988) is a Mexican former professional footballer who most recently played for Alianza Petrolera.
