= Aarón Fernández =

Mexican footballer (born 1987)

Personal information
- Full name: Aarón Fernández García
- Date of birth: 30 July 1987 (age 39)
- Place of birth: Mexico City, Mexico
- Height: 1.81 m (5 ft 11 in)
- Position: Goalkeeper

Team information
- Current team: UANL (goalkeeping coach)

Youth career
- UANL

Senior career*
Years	Team	Apps	(Gls)
2009–2019	UANL	4	(0)
2017–2018	→ Necaxa (loan)	0	(0)
2019	→ Celaya (loan)	16	(0)

Managerial career
- 2023–: UANL (goalkeeping coach)
- * Club domestic league appearances and goals

Aarón "El Shocker" Fernández (born 7 July 1987) is a Mexican football coach and a former player.

== Career ==
He was formed in the basic forces of Tigres de la UANL where he began his career playing in the Tigres Los Mochis subsidiary team, where he made his debut in 2006. He played 7 games in two tournaments and then moved to the first team where he was registered as a third and fourth option. His debut was in the SuperLiga on 20 June 2009, against Chivas USA. Fernandez began the Clausura 2017 as the 3rd string goalkeeper but due to injuries he made his senior Liga MX debut on 4 February 2017.

He was loaned out to Necaxa for the Apertura 2017 season, making his Copa MX debut against Zacatecas.

== Honours ==
Necaxa

- Copa MX: Clausura 2018
