= Javier Aquino =

Mexican footballer (born 1990)

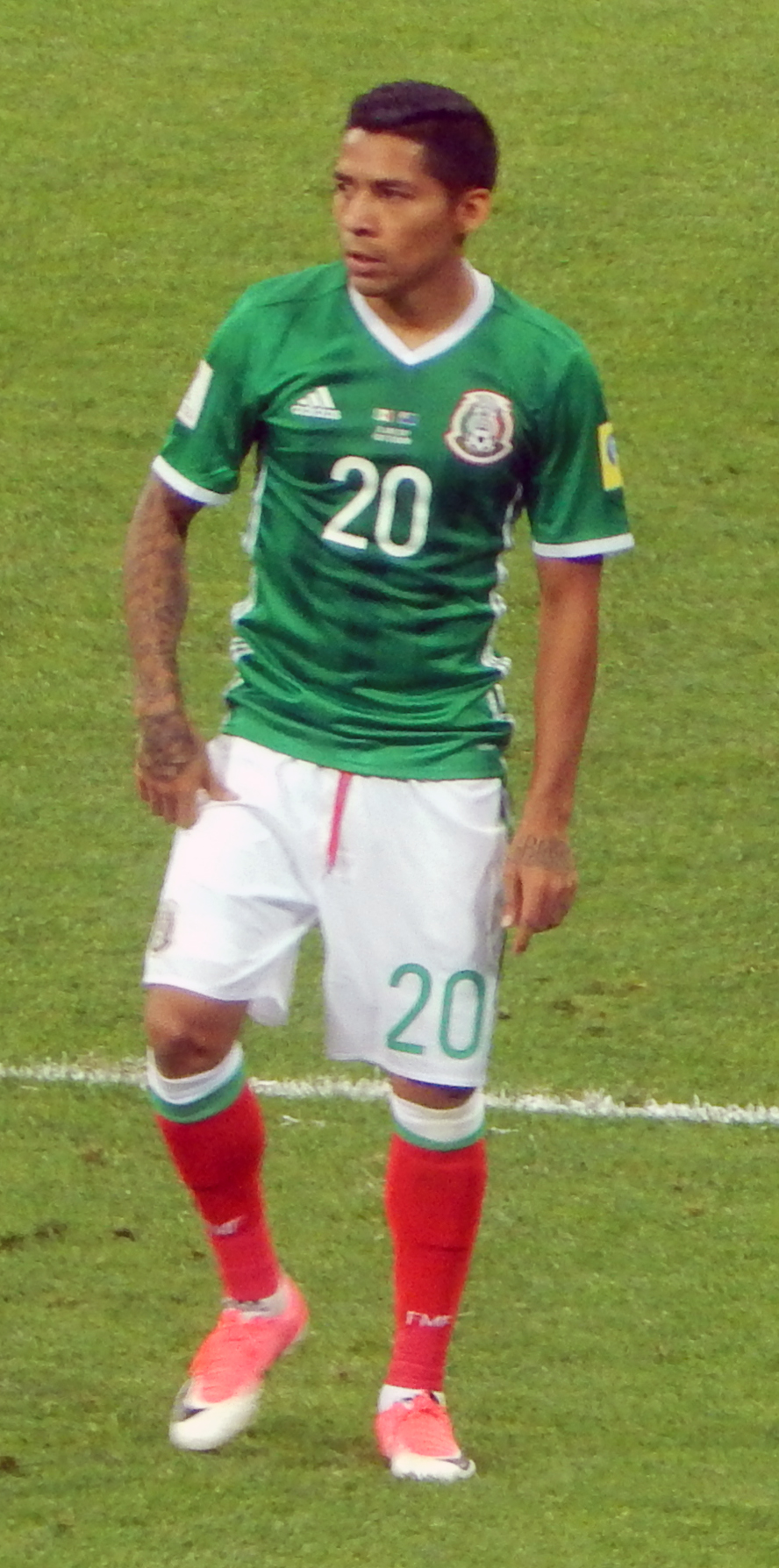
- Aquino with Mexico at the 2017 FIFA Confederations Cup

Personal information
- Full name: Javier Ignacio Aquino Carmona
- Date of birth: 11 February 1990 (age 36)
- Place of birth: San Francisco Ixhuatán, Oaxaca, Mexico
- Height: 1.65 m (5 ft 5 in)
- Positions: Winger; full-back

Team information
- Current team: Juárez
- Number: 20

Youth career
- 2005–2010: Cruz Azul

Senior career*
Years	Team	Apps	(Gls)
2008–2010	Cruz Azul Hidalgo	49	(5)
2010–2013	Cruz Azul	78	(7)
2013–2015	Villarreal	44	(1)
2014–2015	→ Rayo Vallecano (loan)	24	(0)
2015–2025	UANL	361	(26)
2026–	Juárez	22	(0)

International career
2011–2012	Mexico U23	31	(2)
2011–2018	Mexico	54	(0)
Medal record
Men's football
Representing Mexico
Olympic Games
Gold medal – first place	2012 London	Team
Olympic Qualifying Championship
Winner	2012 United States
Toulon Tournament
Winner	2012 France	Team
Pan American Games
Gold medal – first place	2011 Guadalajara	Team
- * Club domestic league appearances and goals as of 27 September 2026

Javier Ignacio Aquino Carmona (Spanish pronunciation: [xaˈβjeɾ aˈkino], born 11 February 1990) is a Mexican professional footballer who plays as a full-back for Juárez in Liga MX. He is an Olympic gold medalist.

Recognized for his pace, technical ability, and creative passing, Aquino began his professional career with Cruz Azul, progressing through the youth system before making his first-team debut in July 2010. He went on to represent Villarreal and Rayo Vallecano in Spain before returning to Mexico with Tigres UANL. Over the following decade, he established himself as a pivotal figure in the squad, helping the club secure five league championships.

Aquino has been called up to the Mexico U-23 national team, where he was a part of the squads playing at the 2011 Copa América, the 2011 Pan American Games, and the 2012 Summer Olympics, where Mexico won the gold medal. He made his debut with the senior national team in 2011, and participated in the 2013 and 2017 FIFA Confederations Cup, as well as the 2014 and 2018 FIFA World Cup.

== Club career ==
=== Cruz Azul ===
Born in San Francisco Ixhuatán in the Mexican state of Oaxaca, Aquino began playing in Cruz Azul's lower division youth squads. Aquino played for Cruz Azul Lagunas of the third division, where he then traveled to Mexico City to join the club's reserves. It would not be until the Apertura 2010 season that Aquino, together with other youth players, joined the first team. Aquino was one of the revelations of the tournament, his main virtues being dribbling, speed and passing accuracy.

On 23 July 2010 during the Apertura 2010, Aquino debuted for Cruz Azul under coach Enrique Meza in a 0–3 win over Estudiantes Tecos, coming in as a 57th-minute substitute for Alejandro Vela. He scored his first goal in the Primera División on 24 October 2010 during match-day 13 of the Apertura 2010 against Morelia in a 1–1 draw at Estadio Morelos. He gradually cemented his place into the team's starting eleven as the main right-winger, going on to play for two more years at Cruz Azul, amassing over 90 appearances for the club, scoring seven goals.

=== Villarreal ===
On 28 January 2013 it was announced that Aquino was transferred to Villarreal CF of Spain. He made his league debut coming on as a 67th-minute substitute for Moi Gómez in a 1–1 draw against Hércules CF.

On 19 August 2013, Javier Aquino made his debut in La Liga, entering as a substitute in the second half of the match against Almería. He collaborated towards the final 3–2 victory for Villarreal, with an assist to fellow Mexican teammate Giovani dos Santos.

==== Loan to Rayo Vallecano ====
On 25 August 2014, Villarreal announced that Aquino would be loaned out for the 2014–15 season to Rayo Vallecano. He made his league debut against Atlético Madrid on 25 August, and played all 90 minutes of the match which ended in a 0–0 draw.

=== UANL ===
In June 2015, Aquino made his return to Mexico, signing with UANL. Over the following decade, he established himself as a pivotal figure in the squad, helping secure ten official titles, including five league championships. After a distinguished tenure, Aquino bid farewell to the club when his contract concluded in December 2025.

=== Juárez ===
In January 2026, Aquino signed with Juárez.

== International career ==
=== Youth ===
Aquino was called up by Luis Fernando Tena to play in the 2011 Pan American Games, in which he played in all six games and won the Gold Medal match against Argentina. He scored his first unofficial international goal in a friendly against Club León on 5 July 2012 in a 1–1 draw.

Aquino took a hiatus from the senior squad to train with the under-23 team in preparations for the 2012 Summer Olympics, in which they won a gold medal in the final against Brazil.

=== Senior ===
Aquino made his official debut with the senior national team on 4 July 2011 against Chile in the 2011 Copa América. He played in all three group matches.

The national team that played the 2011 Copa América was an under-22 squad composed of 5 "over-age" players. FIFA has classified the team as the official "senior squad" but it could be said that his debut with the senior squad was on 11 November 2011 against Serbia in a 2–0 friendly, he coming into play at the 86th minute for Andrés Guardado. He made his next appearance on 25 January 2012 in another friendly against Venezuela where he was attributed as adding creativity to Mexico's offense. He entered the game on the 56th minute while the game was tied 1–1, and was involved in the last two goals that Mexico scored to win the match 3–1.

Aquino was initially omitted from the final 23 man roster that would participate in the 2014 FIFA World Cup, however after Luis Montes suffered a severe leg injury, Aquino would be called up to round out the 23 player at the 2014 World Cup.

Aquino's most brilliant moment came at the 2017 FIFA Confederations Cup against New Zealand. Aquino would go on to be named man of the match.

In May 2018, Aquino was named in Mexico's preliminary 28-man squad for the World Cup, and in June, was ultimately included in the final 23-man roster.

On 29 May 2019, Aquino announced his retirement from international duty.

== Career statistics ==
As of 20 November 2018

Appearances and goals by national team and year
National team	Year	Apps	Goals
Mexico	2011	4	0
Mexico	2012	4	0
Mexico	2013	12	0
Mexico	2014	6	0
Mexico	2015	8	0
Mexico	2016	7	0
Mexico	2017	9	0
Mexico	2018	4	0
Total		54	0

== Honours ==
UANL

- Liga MX: Apertura 2015, Apertura 2016, Apertura 2017, Clausura 2019, Clausura 2023
- Campeón de Campeones: 2016, 2017, 2018, 2023
- CONCACAF Champions League: 2020
- Campeones Cup: 2023

Mexico U23

- Pan American Games: 2011
- CONCACAF Olympic Qualifying Championship: 2012
- Olympic Gold Medal: 2012

Mexico

- CONCACAF Cup: 2015

Individual

- Liga MX Best XI: Apertura 2015
