= José Arturo Rivas =

Mexican footballer (born 1984)

José Rivas
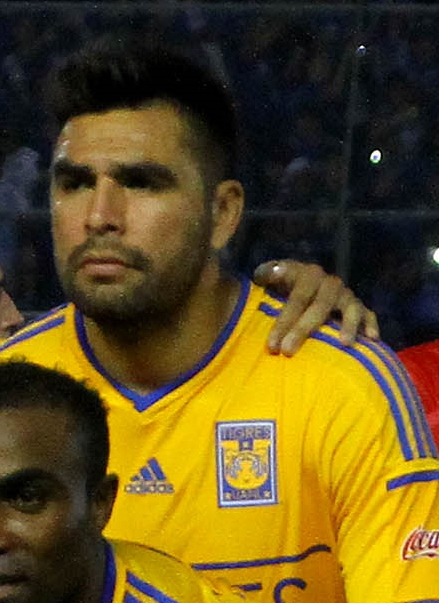
- Rivas with Tigres UANL in 2015

Personal information
- Full name: José Arturo Rivas Mortera
- Date of birth: 18 October 1984 (age 42)
- Place of birth: Coatzacoalcos, Veracruz, Mexico
- Height: 1.88 m (6 ft 2 in)
- Position: Centre-back

Team information
- Current team: UANL U-18 (assistant)

Senior career*
Years	Team	Apps	(Gls)
2001–2003	Delfines de Coatzacoalcos	?	(?)
2003–2004	Zacatepec	?	(?)
2004–2018	Tigres UANL	190	(8)
2017–2018	→ Veracruz (loan)	39	(0)
Total		229	(8)

International career
2015	Mexico	2	(0)

Managerial career
- 2019–: Tigres UANL Reserves and Academy (assistant)
- * Club domestic league appearances and goals

José Arturo Rivas Mortera (born 18 October 1984) is a Mexican former professional footballer who played as a centre-back.

Rivas has spent the most of his career in Tigres, winning three Liga MX, one Copa MX and one Campeón de Campeones championships.

== Career ==
=== Delfines de Coatzacoalcos ===
Born in Coatzacoalcos, Rivas began his football development in his hometown with the youth academy of Delfines de Coatzacoalcos. He played with the club's Tercera División team, establishing himself as a physical left-sided defender. His performances in the lower divisions earned him a move up to the second division with CD Zacatepec ahead of the 2003–04 season, which ultimately served as his final stepping stone before his long-term move to the top flight with Tigres UANL.

=== Zacatepec ===
After starting his development in the youth system of Delfines de Coatzacoalcos, Rivas moved to CD Zacatepec for the 2003–04 season in the Primera División A. Under manager Antonio Mohamed, he established himself in the defense and made 10 appearances for the Morelos-based side. He was a starter during Zacatepec's run to the Invierno 2003 tournament semifinals, where the team was eliminated by Correcaminos UAT. His performances with the club drew the attention of top-flight scouts, leading to his permanent transfer to Tigres UANL in the summer of 2004.

=== Tigres UANL ===
Rivas played most of his career with Tigres playing since 2004 to 2018 ending his career at Veracruz in 2018.

Rivas was born on October 18, 1984, in Coatzacoalcos, Veracruz and at the age of 18 he enrolled with Tigres and from that day on he has never left the institution. La Palma Rivas received the opportunity to be registered in the UANL Tigres first team for the 2004 Apertura. He has been gaining the trust of the various coaches who have directed him. In the 2006 Clausura tournament, he suffered an injury that sidelined him for about a year and a half. In the 2011 Apertura he won the first championship of his career in the Mexican First Division with the UANL Tigres. Three years later, he won his second title in his career in the 2014 Copa MX Clausura.

Rivas had his best year in 2015. He won the starting role in the Clausura 2015 filling the vacancy left by the injured Juninho. since he took the place his absence was not noticed and he even managed to do better. From there he gained the trust of Ricardo Ferretti. That same year Rivas decided to study the career of Technical Trainer with the aim of being linked to football for a long time.

On 25 December 2016, during the second leg of the Apertura 2016 final against Club América, Rivas was involved in a massive on-field brawl at the end of the first half of extra time. The altercation ignited near the technical benches after América manager Ricardo La Volpe and Tigres forward André-Pierre Gignac exchanged words, drawing in both squads. Rivas was among the most heavily active participants in the physical altercation, which included pushing and shouting. Once the fight was broken up, referee Jorge Isaac Rojas showed Rivas a direct red card for violent conduct, alongside América's Paolo Goltz and Ventura Alvarado. Despite his ejection, Tigres went on to equalize late and won the championship 3–0 in a penalty shootout.

=== Veracruz ===
In June 2017, Rivas was loaned to Veracruz for the Apertura 2017 tournament after spending thirteen years with Tigres UANL. He made his official debut for the club on 23 July 2017, playing the full 90 minutes in a 2–0 home defeat against Necaxa. Throughout his loan spell, Rivas served as a regular starting center-back, making 24 league appearances and helping the team navigate its relegation battle. He remained with Veracruz until the conclusion of his loan agreement in 2018, later returning to Tigres where he transitioned into retirement in June 2019.

== Honours ==
Tigres UANL

- Liga MX: Apertura 2011, Apertura 2015, Apertura 2016
- Copa MX: Clausura 2014
- Campeón de Campeones: 2016
