= Jorge Díaz de León =

Mexican footballer (born 1984)

Personal information
- Full name: Jorge Alberto Díaz de León Luque
- Date of birth: 28 March 1984 (age 42)
- Place of birth: San Luis Potosí, Mexico
- Height: 1.85 m (6 ft 1 in)
- Position: Goalkeeper

Senior career*
Years	Team	Apps	(Gls)
2004–2013	UANL	2	(0)
2007–2008	→ Durango (loan)	26	(0)
2009–2011	→ Querétaro (loan)	17	(0)
2013–2014	→ Correcaminos (loan)		
- * Club domestic league appearances and goals

Jorge Alberto Díaz de León Luque(born 28 March 1984) is a Mexican former professional footballer who played as a goalkeeper.

== Career ==
=== Querétaro ===
Jorge Díaz de León started his career in Tigres UANL but after being relegated to the bench in all the games he was loaned to Querétaro FC on 2009, even though his first years he was bench there too, he started playing in 2011 where he played all the Apertura 2011.

=== Return to Tigres UANL ===
After showing his skills at Querétaro he returned to Tigres for the 2011–12 season.

== Honors ==
Tigres UANL

- Mexican Primera División: Apertura 2011
