= Israel Jiménez =

Mexican footballer (born 1989)

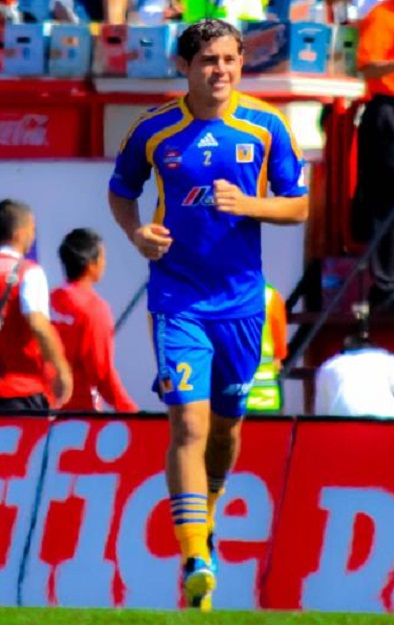
- Jiménez playing for Tigres UANL

Personal information
- Full name: Israel Sabdi Jiménez Nañez
- Date of birth: 13 August 1989 (age 37)
- Place of birth: Monterrey, Nuevo León, Mexico
- Height: 1.76 m (5 ft 9 in)
- Position: Right-back

Youth career
- 2006–2008: Tigres UANL

Senior career*
Years	Team	Apps	(Gls)
2008–2019	Tigres UANL	191	(3)
2014	→ Tijuana (loan)	15	(0)
2019–2020	→ Juárez (loan)	27	(0)
2020–2021	Mazatlán	22	(0)
2022	Monterrey Flash (indoor)	0	(0)

International career^{‡}
2012	Mexico U23	14	(1)
2012–2016	Mexico	10	(0)
Medal record
Men's football
Representing Mexico
Olympic Games
Gold medal – first place	2012 London	Team
Olympic Qualifying Championship
Winner	2012 United States
- * Club domestic league appearances and goals as of 17 June 2022 ‡ National team caps and goals as of 11 February 2016

Israel Sabdi Jiménez Nañez (Note: In this Spanish name, the first or paternal surname is Jiménez and the second or maternal family name is Nañez.) (born 13 August 1989) is a former Mexican professional footballer who last played as a defender for the Monterrey Flash of the Major Arena Soccer League. In traditional outdoor soccer, Jiménez primarily operated as a right-back. He is an Olympic gold medalist.

== Club career ==
=== Tigres UANL ===
On 26 July 2008, Israel Jiménez debuted in the Primera Division in the first game of the Apertura 2008, in a draw 0–0 against Pachuca under the manager, Manuel Lapuente.

His first international game with Tigres UANL was in the 2009 North American SuperLiga in a game against Chivas USA, he played for the entire game.

Since Ricardo Ferretti became the team's coach, Jiménez is a regular starter. He was part of the Apertura 2011 and Apertura 2015 championship-winning team's starting line-up.

=== Monterrey Flash ===
In June 2022, Jiménez signed with the Monterrey Flash of the Major Arena Soccer League.

== International career ==
=== Mexico U-23 ===
In 2012 Jimenez was chosen by coach Luis Fernando Tena to be in the Mexico national team at the 2012 Olympic Qualifying Tournament held in the United States. Jimenez scored in his debut in the tournament from a long range free kick against Trinidad and Tobago. Mexico went on to win the tournament and qualify to the London 2012 Summer Olympics. Jimenez made the final cut for those participating in the Olympics. Jimenez won gold team medal for Mexico after defeating Brazil in the final.

=== Mexico national team ===
On 23 May 2011, Jiménez received an opportunity to play the 2011 Copa America and was called up to the Mexico U-22 national football team preliminary squad. however he did not make the final cut for those participating in the tournament. Jimenez made his full senior debut with Mexico 25 January 2012 in a friendly game against Venezuela, the game resulted in a 3–1 win for Mexico. Jimenez was a squad member at the 2013 CONCACAF Gold Cup.

== Career statistics ==
=== International ===
As of match played 11 February 2016

National team	Year	Apps	Goals
Mexico	2012	5	0
Mexico	2013	1	0
Mexico	2015	3	0
Mexico	2016	1	0
Total		10	0

== Honours ==
Tigres UANL

- Liga MX: Apertura 2011, Apertura 2015, Apertura 2016, Apertura 2017, Clausura 2019
- Copa MX: Clausura 2014
- Campeón de Campeones: 2016, 2017, 2018
- SuperLiga: 2009
- Campeones Cup: 2018

Mexico U23

- CONCACAF Olympic Qualifying Championship: 2012
- Olympic Gold Medal: 2012

Mexico

- CONCACAF Cup: 2015
