= Jorge Torres Nilo =

Mexican footballer (born 1988)

- Torres Nilo with Mexico in 2015

Personal information
- Full name: Jorge Emmanuel Torres Nilo
- Date of birth: 16 January 1988 (age 38)
- Place of birth: Tijuana, Baja California, Mexico
- Height: 1.82 m (6 ft 0 in)
- Position: Left-back

Youth career
- 2002–2006: Atlas

Senior career*
Years	Team	Apps	(Gls)
2006–2010	Atlas	90	(5)
2006–2008	Académicos	4	(0)
2010–2020	Tigres	319	(1)
2021–2023	Toluca	44	(2)

International career
2005	Mexico U17	2	(0)
2007–2011	Mexico U23	3	(0)
2016	Mexico Olympic (O.P.)	3	(0)
2008–2016	Mexico	49	(1)
Medal record
Representing Mexico
Men's Football
Pan American Games
Bronze medal – third place	2007 Rio de Janeiro	Team competition
CONCACAF Gold Cup
Winner	CONCACAF Gold Cup	2011
Winner	CONCACAF Gold Cup	2015
- * Club domestic league appearances and goals

Jorge Emmanuel Torres Nilo (born 16 January 1988), also known as Pechu, is a Mexican former professional footballer who played as a left-back.

== Club career ==
=== Atlas ===
Torres Nilo started his football career at Atlas, where he was used in the club's youth team Academicos in the second division. Shortly after he made his professional debut under coach Daniel Guzmán on 25 February 2006 against Tecos UAG, coming in as a substitute for Rafael García Torres in the 85th minute of the match, which ended in a 4–0 victory for Atlas. Torres Nilo participated in the 2008 Copa Libertadores tournament with Atlas, where he played in their six group matches and scored one goal, against Boca Juniors in the first leg of the quarter-finals.

In 2010 it was announced Jorge Torres Nilo would be sold to Tigres for the Apertura 2010 tournament.

=== Tigres ===
On 27 May 2010, Torres Nilo was sold to Tigres. He made his debut with Tigres on 21 August 2010 in a home game against Santos Laguna the match ended in a 1–0 victory. He did not debut until the 5th week of the Apertura 2010 season. Torres Nilo was named best defender of the Apertura 2011 season alongside teammate Hugo Ayala and has captured the eyes of many European teams, among them CSKA Moscow, and the Olympique de Marseille.

== International career ==
=== Youth ===
In 2005 Coach Jesús Ramírez selected Torres Nilo to participate in the 2005 CONCACAF U17 Tournament held in Culiacán. in that tournament he played 2 matches against Canada, and Haiti. Torres Nilo did not make the final roster for those participating in the 2005 FIFA U-17 World Cup in which Mexico would win its first youth world cup.

In 2007 Coach René Isidoro García selected Jorge Torres Nilo to participate in the 2007 Pan American Games held in Rio de Janeiro. Mexico won Bronze after defeating Bolivia in the 3rd place match. Jorge Torres Nilo also participated in the 2007 Digicel Shield with Mexico U-23, he only played in the final against Trinidad and Tobago in which Mexico would receive second place after losing 2–1 in the final.

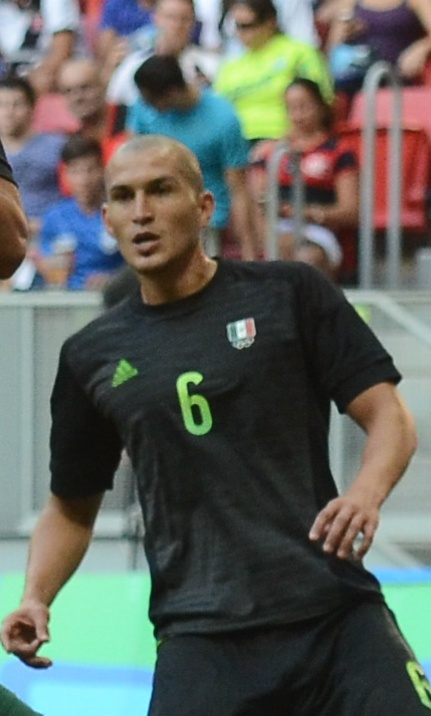
Torres Nilo with Mexico at the 2016 Summer Olympics

Torres-Nilo was called up as one of the 3 (overage players to represent Mexico U23 at the 2016 Summer Olympics held in Rio de Janeiro, Brazil.

=== Senior ===
Torres Nilo made his senior national team debut 24 September 2008 under coach Sven-Göran Eriksson in a friendly game against Chile in the Los Angeles Memorial Coliseum, the game ended in a 0–1 defeat for Mexico. after an own goal from Juan Carlos Valenzuela. After a year of inactivity with Mexico Torres Nilo was called by coach Javier Aguirre in 2010 to play in friendly games in preparation for the World Cup, Torres Nilo would make the final cut for those participating in the 2010 FIFA World Cup. Jorge Torres Nilo did not appear in any world cup matches. He scored his first goal for Mexico on 28 May 2011 in a friendly game against Ecuador in Seattle, he gave Mexico a 1–0 lead. The match ended in a 1–1 draw. Torres Nilo participated in the 2011 CONCACAF Gold Cup in which Mexico won the title after defeating United States in the final. Torres Nilo participated in the 2013 FIFA Confederations Cup held in Brazil and played 2 matches.

== Career statistics ==
=== International ===
As of match played 3 September 2016

National team	Year	Apps	Goals
Mexico	2008	1	0
Mexico	2010	8	0
Mexico	2011	7	1
Mexico	2012	11	0
Mexico	2013	10	0
Mexico	2014	1	0
Mexico	2015	6	0
Mexico	2016	5	0
Total		49	1

=== International goals ===
Scores and results list Mexico's goal tally first.

Goal	Date	Venue	Opponent	Score	Result	Competition
1.	28 May 2011	CenturyLink Field, Seattle, United States	Ecuador	1–0	1–1	Friendly

== Honours ==
Tigres

- Liga MX: Apertura 2011, Apertura 2015, Apertura 2016, Apertura 2017, Clausura 2019
- Copa MX: Clausura 2014
- Campeón de Campeones: 2016, 2017, 2018
- CONCACAF Champions League: 2020
- Campeones Cup: 2018

Mexico U23

- Pan American Bronze Medal: 2007

Mexico

- CONCACAF Gold Cup: 2011, 2015
- CONCACAF Cup: 2015

Individual

- Mexican Primera División Best Full-back: Apertura 2011
