= Jorge Padilla (footballer, born 1993) =

Mexican footballer

Personal information
- Full name: Jorge Antonio Padilla Leal
- Date of birth: 6 September 1993 (age 33)
- Place of birth: Guadalajara, Jalisco, Mexico
- Height: 1.80 m (5 ft 11 in)
- Position: Right-back

Team information
- Current team: FC Santa Coloma
- Number: 5

Youth career
- 2010–2012: Guadalajara
- 2012–2015: UdeG

Senior career*
Years	Team	Apps	(Gls)
2015–2020	UdeG	88	(1)
2020–2023	Mazatlán	75	(0)
2024	UdeG	19	(0)
2024–2026	FC Rànger's	36	(1)
2026–	FC Santa Coloma	0	(0)
- * Club domestic league appearances and goals as of 15 June 2026

Jorge Antonio Padilla Leal (Note: In this Spanish name, the first or paternal surname is Padilla and the second or maternal family name is Leal.) (born 6 September 1993) is a Mexican professional footballer who plays as a right-back for Primera Divisió club FC Santa Coloma.
