= Lucas Lobos =

Argentine-born Mexican footballer (born 1981)

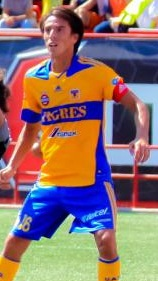
- Lobos playing for Tigres UANL

Personal information
- Full name: Lucas Armando Lobos Mack
- Date of birth: August 3, 1981 (age 45)
- Height: 1.76 m (5 ft 9 1/2 in)
- Position: Attacking midfielder

Senior career*
Years	Team	Apps	(Gls)
2001–2006	Gimnasia y Esgrima La Plata	105	(11)
2006–2008	Cádiz	47	(15)
2008–2014	Tigres UANL	219	(68)
2014–2016	Toluca	48	(2)
2016–2017	Gimnasia y Esgrima La Plata	14	(0)
Total		433	(96)
- * Club domestic league appearances and goals

Lucas Armando Lobos Mack (born August 3, 1981) is an Argentine former professional footballer who played as an attacking midfielder. He is a Mexican naturalized citizen.

Lobos is a two-time winner of the Liga MX Balón de Oro for Best Player and for several years he was widely considered one of the top footballers of the Mexican League, mostly for his remarkable seasons with Tigres UANL, where he became an idol.

== Career ==
=== Club de Gimnasia y Esgrima La Plata ===
Lobos was born in La Plata, Argentina. Encouraged by his father, he did tryouts with several teams of Argentina, such as the Newell's Old Boys, Boca Juniors, Club de Gimnasia y Esgrima La Plata and River Plate. At the age of nineteen Lobos was signed by the team Club de Gimnasia y Esgrima La Plata to play in the junior divisions of Argentina. In three months he had become part of the first team, debuting in the Argentine Primera División in the second half of a game against Club Atlético Banfield. Lobos remained in the team from 2001 to 2005, ending runner-up twice.

=== Cádiz CF ===
At the age of twenty-four, Lobos signed up with the Spanish team Cádiz CF, playing in La Liga, the first division of Spain. His performance did not prevent the relegation of the team to Segunda División, the second division. Lobos spent two seasons in Cádiz.

=== Tigres UANL ===
In December 2007 by the hand of Enrique Borja, Lobos signed for four years with Tigres UANL on a $3.5 million deal. Almost finishing the Clausura 2008, Lobos underwent an operation on one of his knees. On August 11, 2010, Lobos re-signed for three more years with UANL. In 2011, the post of captain was given to him for being the most committed player. On December 11, 2011, Lucas led Tigres to their third championship, and was awarded for the second time in a row as both, the MVP and best attacking midfielder of the Mexican League. In March, 2012, Alejandro Sabella, the head coach of the Argentina national team, stated that he was considering the chance to include Lobos in the team. In November, 2012, Lobos re-signed for three more years with UANL. On June 4, 2014, it was announced that Lobos was transferred to Mexican side Toluca on a $5 million deal. After the news of the transfer of Lobos to Toluca, over a hundred fans of Tigres UANL received him at the Monterrey International Airport chanting his name in an emotional farewell. Lobos left Tigres UANL as the last idol of the team and one of the greatest players in the club's history.

=== Deportivo Toluca F.C. ===
After his arrival to Toluca, Lucas Lobos became a regular starter under the command of José Saturnino Cardozo. Due his discrete performance in two seasons and an operation on a knee, Lobos was not registered to play the Apertura 2015 tournament. Hernan Cristante, Toluca's new head coach, stated that Lobos was not part of the plans of the team.

=== Return to Club de Gimnasia y Esgrima La Plata ===
In August, 2016, it was announced that Lobos would return to the team where he made his professional debut: Club de Gimnasia y Esgrima La Plata as a youth coach .

=== Amateur ===
After a discreet stage in Gimnasia y Esgrima La Plata, on July 29, 2017, it is confirmed that Lobos would not retire and decided to continue playing, now with amateur Club Unidos de Olmos of the Liga Amateur Platense.

== International career ==
On September 19, 2013 coach Víctor Manuel Vucetich called up Lobos for the Mexico national football team after Lucas became a naturalized Mexican citizen, but did not play any of the two games.

== Style of play ==
A creative attacking midfielder, Lobos used to command the attack in the last third of the field. Under coach Ricardo Ferretti, he played as a central attacking midfielder in Tigres' 4–2–3–1 formation and as second striker in 4–4–1–1. Occasionally, Lobos also played as either left or right winger. He had a remarkable technical ability as did both, assisted and scored goals. A right-footed set-piece specialist, he was also known for his ability to score goals from free kicks. Former captain of Tigres, Lobos was praised by the media and the audience for his quality, professionalism and leadership. According to Goal.com, he "possesses vision, technique on the ball and a work ethic to go with his talent."

== Personal life ==
Lobos and his wife Florencia are married since 2005. In 2006, his daughter Lola was born in Cádiz. On January 9, 2013, his twins, Lucia and Mateo were born in Monterrey. Lobos is fan of his former team Club de Gimnasia y Esgrima La Plata. In July 2013, Lobos became a naturalized Mexican citizen after settling in Mexico in 2008.

== Honours ==
Tigres UANL

- Mexican Primera División: Apertura 2011
- Copa MX: Clausura 2014

Individual

- Mexican Primera División Golden Ball: Clausura 2011, Apertura 2011
- Mexican Primera División Best Attacking Midfielder: Apertura 2011, Clausura 2012
