= Edno =

Brazilian footballer (born 1983)

Personal information
- Full name: Edno Roberto Cunha
- Date of birth: 31 May 1983 (age 43)
- Place of birth: Lages, Brazil
- Height: 1.83 m (6 ft 0 in)
- Positions: Attacking midfielder; second striker

Team information
- Current team: Bela Vista-TO (head coach)

Youth career
- –1999: Lages EC
- 1999–2001: Avaí

Senior career*
Years	Team	Apps	(Gls)
2002	Avaí		
2002–2003	PSV	0	(0)
2003	Viktoria Plzeň	8	(1)
2004	Wisła Kraków	4	(0)
2005	Figueirense	2	(0)
2006	Novo Hamburgo	0	(0)
2006–2007	Noroeste		(0)
2007–2008	Atlético Paranaense	21	(2)
2008	→ Noroeste (loan)	0	(0)
2008–2009	Portuguesa	49	(9)
2009–2012	Corinthians	9	(0)
2010	→ Botafogo (loan)	36	(6)
2011–2012	→ Portuguesa (loan)	35	(13)
2012–2013	Tigres de la UANL	20	(3)
2013	→ Cerezo Osaka (loan)	28	(5)
2014	Ponte Preta	13	(6)
2014	Vitória	15	(5)
2015	Portuguesa	0	(0)
2015	ABC	20	(7)
2016	São Bento	0	(0)
2016–2017	Remo	16	(7)
2017	São Bernardo	0	(0)
2017	Botafogo SP	16	(5)
2017	América	9	(2)
2018	Moreirense	8	(0)
2018	Tubarão	0	(0)
2019	Remo	0	(0)
2019–2020	Brasiliense	5	(0)

International career
2002	Brazil U20		

Managerial career
- 2024–: Bela Vista-TO
- * Club domestic league appearances and goals

Edno Roberto Cunha (born 31 May 1983), simply known as Edno, is a Brazilian football coach and former player who played as either an attacking midfielder or a second striker. He is the current head coach of Bela Vista-TO.

== Biography ==
Edno was signed by Corinthians on 15 September 2009 for R$3,558,000 for 50% economic rights., which Portuguesa received R$3 million and retained 40% economic rights. In 2012, he was sold from Corinthians and Portuguesa for US$1.5 million and $1.2 million respectively

== Honours ==
=== Club ===
Wisła Kraków

- Ekstraklasa: 2003–04

Botafogo

- Campeonato Carioca: 2010

Corinthians

- Campeonato Brasileiro Série A: 2011

Portuguesa

- Campeonato Brasileiro Série B: 2011

América Mineiro

- Campeonato Brasileiro Série B: 2017
