= Manuel Viniegra =

Mexican footballer (born 1988)

Personal information
- Full name: Manuel Viniegra García
- Date of birth: 26 April 1988 (age 38)
- Place of birth: Monterrey, Nuevo León, Mexico
- Height: 1.80 m (5 ft 11 in)
- Position: Midfielder

Youth career
- Tigres UANL

Senior career*
Years	Team	Apps	(Gls)
2006–2020	Tigres UANL	125	(4)
2014	→ Atlante (loan)	14	(1)
2017–2018	→ Veracruz (loan)	5	(0)
2018–2020	→ Juárez (loan)	2	(0)
2021	Querétaro	1	(0)
2022	Tlaxcala	17	(0)

International career
2012	Mexico	1	(0)
- * Club domestic league appearances and goals as of 5 October 2022

Manuel Viniegra García (born 26 April 1988) is a Mexican former professional footballer who played as a midfielder.

== Club career ==
Viniegra started his career with Liga MX club Tigres UANL. He made his professional debut during the 2007 Clausura tournament under head coach Mario Carrillo, and has played for the Mexico national football team.

== International ==
Viniegra got called up by José Manuel de la Torre to play for Mexico against United States on August 15, 2012, and wore the number 6.

=== International Caps ===
As of 15 August 2012

International appearances
#	Date	Venue	Opponent	Result	Competition
1.	15 August 2012	Estadio Azteca, Mexico City, Mexico	United States	0–1	Friendly

== Honours ==
Tigres UANL

- Liga MX: Apertura 2011, Apertura 2015, Apertura 2016
