= Ricardo Ferretti =

Brazilian-Mexican football player and manager

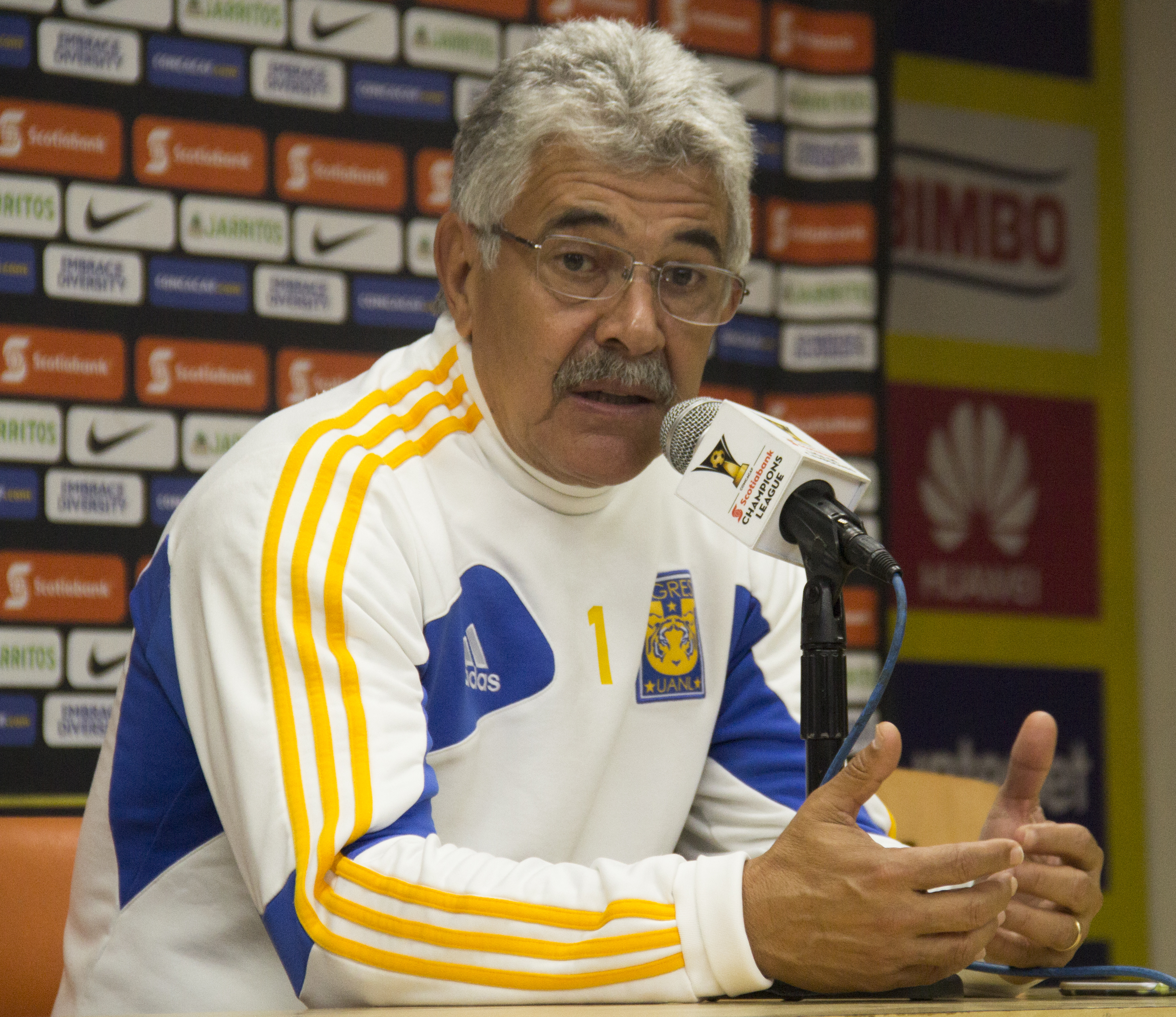
- Ferretti as Tigres UANL manager in 2016

Personal information
- Full name: Ricardo Ferretti de Oliveira
- Date of birth: 22 February 1954 (age 72)
- Place of birth: Rio de Janeiro, Brazil
- Position: Attacking midfielder

Senior career*
Years	Team	Apps	(Gls)
1971–1975	Botafogo		
1975–1976	Vasco da Gama		
1976–1977	Bonsucesso		
1977–1978	Atlas	26	(8)
1978–1985	UNAM	240	(108)
1985–1986	Neza		
1986–1987	Monterrey	31	(9)
1988–1990	Toluca	104	(44)
1990–1991	UNAM	43	(7)

Managerial career
- 1991–1996: UNAM
- 1993: Mexico (interim)
- 1996–2000: Guadalajara
- 2000–2003: UANL
- 2003–2004: Toluca
- 2005: Morelia
- 2006: UANL
- 2006–2010: UNAM
- 2010–2021: UANL
- 2015: Mexico (interim)
- 2018: Mexico (interim)
- 2021–2022: Juárez
- 2023: Cruz Azul
- * Club domestic league appearances and goals

Ricardo Ferretti de Oliveira (born 22 February 1954), also known as Tuca, is a Brazilian-Mexican professional football manager and former player who currently works for ESPN Deportes and ESPN Mexico as an analyst.

As a player, Ferretti was an attacking midfielder renowned for his free-kick expertise, mobility, powerful right foot, and natural leadership. He spent the bulk of his career with Universidad Nacional, where he stands as the club's second all-time leading scorer. Before making Mexico his home, he turned out for Botafogo, Vasco da Gama, and Bonsucesso in Brazil, and went on to represent Atlas, Neza, Monterrey, and Toluca on the Mexican side of his career.

As a manager, Ferretti led several prominent Mexican clubs, including Universidad Nacional, Guadalajara, Toluca and Cruz Azul. His most enduring and influential spell came with Tigres UANL, where he served for eleven years and guided them to five league championships. In addition to his club career, he was appointed interim head coach of the Mexico national team on three occasions, overseeing a total of eleven matches.

Ferretti holds the national record for the most league matches managed, and alongside Ignacio Trelles, shares the distinction of being the most decorated manager in Mexican football history by league titles.

== Club career ==
Ferretti launched his career in Brazil, entering the Botafogo youth academy, where his brother, Fernando Ferretti, was already playing professionally. He later moved to Vasco da Gama and Bonsucesso, though he found limited playtime at both clubs. In 1977, his agent arranged a move to Mexico to explore new opportunities.

Ferretti arrived in Mexico to strengthen Atlas during the 1977–1978 season. His time with Los Zorros was modest: he joined midway through the campaign with the mission of avoiding relegation. Despite scoring nine goals, his efforts weren’t enough, and Atlas ultimately went down. He left the club at the end of the season and signed with UNAM.

With Pumas, he reached the final of the 1978–1979 season, though Cruz Azul claimed the title. Ferretti, however, remained with the squad and quickly became a key figure. Under the guidance of Bora Milutinović, Pumas reached the final of the 1980–1981 tournament, defeating Cruz Azul 4–2 on aggregate.

Ferretti’s stay with UNAM lasted until 1985. That year, they reached another final, this time falling to Club América, which marked his departure from the institution.

After stints with Neza, Monterrey, and Toluca, Ferretti retired at the conclusion of the 1989-90 season to join the technical staff of Miguel Mejía Barón at Pumas. However, Mejía Barón persuaded him to play one final season for the club, and Ferretti agreed. It was during that campaign that he reached the pinnacle of his playing career: in the final against Club América, he scored a stunning free-kick that secured another league title for the auriazules. With 128 goals across all competitions, he cemented his place as the club’s second all-time top scorer.

Following that championship, Ferretti retired as a footballer once again and succeeded Mejía Barón as head coach of Pumas, beginning his long and successful career as a manager in Mexican football.

== Coaching career ==
=== Early Career and Initial Success ===
Ferretti began his managerial career in 1991 with Universidad Nacional, marking the start of his long association with Mexican football. In the 1996–97 season, he moved to Guadalajara, where he achieved his first significant success as a manager. Ferretti led the team to victory in the Verano 1997 tournament, securing his first title in Mexican football. The following season, he guided Chivas to a runner-up finish, further solidifying his reputation. Over his eight seasons at the helm, Ferretti consistently led the team to the playoffs, missing out only once.

In the Invierno 2000, Ferretti took charge of Tigres UANL, a club with a talented roster but struggling to meet expectations. In his first season, he led the team to the playoffs, and in the following season, they finished as runners-up. However, after Tigres were eliminated by Monterrey in the Clausura 2003 semi-finals, the club opted not to renew Ferretti’s contract.

=== Expanding Influence and Club Transitions ===
Ferretti moved to Toluca in the Apertura 2003. There, he helped the team maintain a strong record of playoff appearances, and under his leadership, the club won the CONCACAF Champions Cup. Despite these achievements, Ferretti’s tenure ended due to differences with the club’s star player, José Cardozo.

Ferretti's next role was at Morelia, where he guided the team through a challenging period and helped them avoid relegation. He returned to Tigres for a second stint during the Clausura 2006. However, after failing to qualify for the playoffs that season, Ferretti was let go.

Once again, Ferretti took charge of Universidad Nacional in the Apertura 2006, a club struggling with poor results and relegation concerns. Under his guidance, Pumas reached the final of the Apertura 2007, though they were defeated by Atlante. The following Clausura 2009 saw Ferretti lead Pumas to another final, where they triumphed over Pachuca to claim the title.

=== Success at Tigres and Later Years ===
Ferretti’s third tenure at Tigres began in the Apertura 2010, during a time when the club was facing relegation concerns. His arrival marked the start of a turnaround for Tigres, culminating in a league title in the Apertura 2011, where they defeated Santos Laguna to end a 29-year championship drought.

Ferretti continued to guide Tigres to success in subsequent years, including a runner-up finish in the Clausura 2014 to Club América and a Copa Libertadores final appearance in 2015, where they were defeated by River Plate. In the same year, Tigres won the Apertura 2015 title by defeating UNAM. The team claimed another league championship in the Apertura 2016, but were defeated in the Clausura 2017 final by Guadalajara.

A significant moment in Ferretti's career came in the Apertura 2017, when Tigres won their first Clásico Regiomontano league final, defeating Monterrey. On November 25, 2018, Ferretti surpassed Ignacio Trelles as the manager with the most league matches in Mexican football history, managing his 1,082nd match. In the Clausura 2019, Ferretti led Tigres to another league title, defeating León and securing his seventh overall championship, matching the record set by Trelles.

In December 2020, Ferretti guided Tigres to their first CONCACAF Champions League title, defeating Los Angeles FC. His managerial career at the club came to an end on May 8, 2021, capping off an 11-year reign in which he cemented his legacy as the club's most successful coach, winning ten official titles.

In the later stages of his career, Ferretti took managerial roles at Juárez and Cruz Azul. However, despite his earlier successes, he was unable to replicate the same level of achievement with these clubs.

=== Mexico national team ===
Ferretti served as interim manager of the Mexico national team on three occasions, overseeing eleven matches. Despite repeated efforts by the Mexican Football Federation to appoint him as the permanent head coach, Ferretti consistently declined the offer.

His first interim appointment occurred in June 1993, when he stepped in as head coach for a friendly match against Costa Rica, temporarily replacing Miguel Mejía Barón.

The second instance was in August 2015, following the unexpected departure of Miguel Herrera. He faced Trinidad & Tobago, Argentina, and Panama in friendly matches, and triumphed over the United States in the 2015 CONCACAF Cup to qualify for the 2017 FIFA Confederations Cup.

Ferretti’s third interim role took place in August 2018, when he managed the national team for a series of friendly matches, including contests against Uruguay, the United States, Costa Rica, Chile, and Argentina.

== Managerial statistics ==
As of 3 August 2023. (Note: Includes matches from Liga MX, Copa MX, Campeon de Campeones, Supercopa MX, CONCACAF Champions League, Copa Libertadores, Superliga, Interliga)

Team	Nat	From	To	Record							
Team	Nat	From	To	G	W	D	L	GF	GA	GD	Win %
UNAM	(Mexico)	September 15, 1991	June 30, 1996	217	81	63	73	327	266	+61	37.33
Guadalajara	(Mexico)	July 1, 1996	June 30, 2000	196	88	55	53	307	227	+80	44.90
UANL	(Mexico)	July 1, 2000	June 30, 2003	121	51	36	34	163	137	+26	42.15
Toluca	(Mexico)	September 30, 2003	December 31, 2004	80	40	14	26	137	102	+35	50.00
Morelia	(Mexico)	January 1, 2005	December 31, 2005	40	17	9	14	59	51	+8	42.50
UANL	(Mexico)	January 1, 2006	June 30, 2006	27	10	10	7	39	33	+6	37.04
UNAM	(Mexico)	May 23, 2006	May 16, 2010	179	64	58	57	237	188	+49	35.75
UANL	(Mexico)	May 20, 2010	May 8, 2021	530	246	159	125	814	517	+297	46.42
Juárez	(Mexico)	June 3, 2021	May 5, 2022	34	7	6	21	24	53	−29	20.59
Cruz Azul	(Mexico)	February 22, 2023	August 7, 2023	17	5	4	8	16	22	−6	29.41
Mexico (Interim)	(Mexico)	June 28, 1993	June 30, 1993	1	1	0	0	2	0	+2	100.00
Mexico (Interim)	(Mexico)	August 20, 2015	October 15, 2015	4	2	2	0	9	7	+2	50.00
Mexico (Interim)	(Mexico)	July 29, 2018	November 17, 2018	6	1	0	5	4	12	−8	16.67
Total				1,452	613	415	424	2,138	1,615	+523	42.22

== Honours ==
=== Player ===
UNAM

- Mexican Primera División: 1980–81, 1990–91
- CONCACAF Champions' Cup: 1980, 1982
- Copa Interamericana: 1981

Toluca

- Copa México: 1988–89

Individual

- Mexican Primera División Best Winger: 1980–81

=== Manager ===
Guadalajara

- Mexican Primera División: Verano 1997

Toluca

- CONCACAF Champions' Cup: 2003
- Campeón de Campeones: 2003

UNAM

- Mexican Primera División: Clausura 2009

UANL

- Liga MX: Apertura 2011, Apertura 2015, Apertura 2016, Apertura 2017, Clausura 2019
- Copa MX: Clausura 2014
- Campeón de Campeones: 2016, 2017, 2018
- Interliga: 2006
- CONCACAF Champions League: 2020
- Campeones Cup: 2018

Mexico

- CONCACAF Cup: 2015

Individual

- Mexican Primera División Best Manager: 1996–97, Clausura 2009, Clausura 2011, Apertura 2011
- Liga MX Best XI Manager: Apertura 2017
- CONCACAF Men's Football Coach of the Year: 2016 (2nd place)

== See also ==
- List of football managers with the most matches
