= Apertura 2013 Liga MX final phase =

Tournament details
- Dates: 24 November–15 December 2013
- Teams: 8

Tournament statistics
- Matches played: 14
- Goals scored: 49 (3.5 per match)
- Attendance: 480,338 (34,310 per match)

The Apertura 2013 Liga MX final phase commonly known as Liguilla (mini league) was played from 24 November 2015 to 15 December 2015. A total of eight teams competed in the final phase to decide the champions of the Apertura 2013 Liga MX season. Both finalists qualified to the 2014–15 CONCACAF Champions League.

== Qualified teams ==
Pos	Team	Pld	Pts
1	América	17	37
2	Santos Laguna	17	33
3	León	17	30
4	Cruz Azul	17	29
5	Toluca	17	27
6	Morelia	17	27
7	Querétaro	17	26
8	UANL	17	25

Updated to match(es) played on unknown. Source:

== Bracket ==
Quarterfinals
1	América (a)	2	1	3
8	UANL	2	1	3
4	Cruz Azul	0	1	1
5	Toluca	3	1	4
2	Santos Laguna	3	3	6
7	Querétaro	2	1	3
3	León	3	4	7
6	Morelia	3	0	3

Semifinals
1	América	1	2	3
5	Toluca	2	0	2
2	Santos Laguna	1	2	3
3	León	3	2	5

Finals
1	América	0	1	1
3	León	2	3	5

== Quarter-finals ==
Team 1	Agg.	Team 2	1st leg	2nd leg
UANL	3–3 (a)	América	2–2	1–1
Querétaro	3–6	Santos Laguna	2–3	1–3
Morelia	3–7	León	3–3	0–4
Toluca	4–1	Cruz Azul	3–0	1–1

=== Matches ===
24 November 2013
17:00 CST (UTC−6)

UANL	2–2	América
Pulido 31'; Pizarro 36'	Report	Valenzuela 14'; Mosquera 89'

Estadio Universitario, San Nicolás de los Garza
Attendance: 41,079
Referee: Jorge Isaac Rojas (Mexico City)
1 December 2013
17:00 CST (UTC−6)

América	1–1	UANL
Jiménez 52'	Report	Pulido 57'

Estadio Azteca, Mexico City
Attendance: 49,570
Referee: Marco Antonio Rodríguez (Mexico City)

3–3 on aggregate. América advanced on away goals.

24 November 2013
20:00 CST (UTC−6)

Querétaro	2–3	Santos Laguna
Romo 78', 79'	Report	Quintero 15', 51'; Escoboza 70'

Estadio Corregidora, Querétaro
Attendance: 19,857
Referee: Ricardo Arellano (Aguascalientes)
1 December 2013
20:00 CST (UTC−6)

Santos Laguna	3–1	Querétaro
Peralta 47'; Quintero 67', 78'	Report	Romo 56'

Estadio Corona, Torreón
Attendance: 22,061
Referee: Paul Delgadillo (Jalisco)

Santos Laguna won 6–3 on aggregate.

23 November 2013
19:00 CST (UTC−6)

Morelia	3–3	León
Montero 28'; Guzmán 73', 83'	Report	Montes 15'; Boselli 21'; El. Hernández 38'

Estadio Morelos, Morelia
Attendance: 23,808
Referee: Jorge Antonio Pérez (Veracruz)
30 November 2013
19:00 CST (UTC−6)

León	4–0	Morelia
Burbano 28'; Boselli 57'; Britos 68'; Vázquez 69'	Report

Estadio León, León
Attendance: 22,555
Referee: Roberto García Orozco (Mexico City)

León won 7–3 on aggregate.

23 November 2013
17:00 CST (UTC−6)

Toluca	3–0	Cruz Azul
Rojas 31'; Pereira 37' (o.g.); Gamboa 79'	Report

Estadio Nemesio Díez, Toluca
Attendance: 17,401
Referee: Fernando Guerrero (Mexico City)
30 November 2013
17:00 CST (UTC−6)

Cruz Azul	1–1	Toluca
Giménez 33' (pen.)	Report	Velázquez 78'

Estadio Azul, Mexico City
Attendance: 10,016
Referee: César Arturo Ramos (Sinaloa)

Toluca won 4–1 on aggregate.

== Semi-finals ==
Team 1	Agg.	Team 2	1st leg	2nd leg
Toluca	2–3	América	2–1	0–2
León	5–3	Santos Laguna	3–1	2–2

=== Matches ===
5 December 2013
19:00 CST (UTC−6)

Toluca	2–1	América
Brizuela 50'; Benítez 55'	Report	Rey 34'

Estadio Nemesio Díez, Toluca
Attendance: 20,553
Referee: Fernando Guerrero (Mexico City)
8 December 2013
17:00 CST (UTC−6)

América	2–0	Toluca
Mosquera 12'; Molina 84'	Report

Estadio Azteca, Mexico City
Attendance: 77,030
Referee: Roberto García Orozco (Mexico City)

América won 3–2 on aggregate.

5 December 2013
21:06 CST (UTC−6)

León	3–1	Santos Laguna
Vázquez 35'; Peña 43'; Arizala 70'	Report	Orozco 90+2'

Estadio León, León
Attendance: 26,508
Referee: César Arturo Ramos (Sinaloa)
8 December 2013
20:00 CST (UTC−6)

Santos Laguna	2–2	León
Peralta 51'; Rodríguez 90+4' (pen.)	Report	Boselli 56'; Peña 89'

Estadio Corona, Torreón
Attendance: 23,787
Referee: Paul Delgadillo (Jalisco)

León won 5–3 on aggregate.

== Finals ==
Team 1	Agg.	Team 2	1st leg	2nd leg
León	5–1	América	2–0	3–1

=== First leg ===
12 December 2013
20:06 CST (UTC−6)

León	2–0	América
Peña 11'; Boselli 76'	Report

Estadio León, León
Attendance: 29,457
Referee: César Arturo Ramos (Sinaloa)

León	América

GK	25	(United States) William Yarbrough
DF	7	(Mexico) Edwin Hernández
DF	35	(Mexico) Ignacio González
DF	19	(Mexico) Jonny Magallón
DF	4	(Mexico) Rafael Márquez (c)
MF	18	(Colombia) Hernán Burbano	(substituted off) 58'
MF	23	(Mexico) José Juan Vázquez
MF	27	(Mexico) Carlos Peña	(substituted off) 87'
MF	10	(Mexico) Luis Montes	(substituted off) 75'
FW	17	(Argentina) Mauro Boselli
FW	9	(Uruguay) Matías Britos
Substitutions:
GK	16	(Mexico) Christian Martínez
DF	5	(Mexico) Fernando Navarro	(substituted on) 87'
DF	21	(Mexico) Luis Delgado
MF	8	(Mexico) Elías Hernández
MF	11	(Colombia) Franco Arizala	(substituted on) 75'
FW	20	(Colombia) Eisner Loboa	(substituted on) 58'
FW	13	(Mexico) Mauricio Castañeda
Manager:
(Uruguay) Gustavo Matosas

GK	23	(Mexico) Moisés Muñoz
DF	19	(Mexico) Miguel Layún
DF	6	(Mexico) Juan Carlos Valenzuela		(substituted off) 86'
DF	2	(Mexico) Francisco Javier Rodríguez	(yellow card) 79'
DF	3	(Colombia) Aquivaldo Mosquera (c)	(yellow card) 90+2'
DF	22	(Mexico) Paul Aguilar
MF	14	(Argentina) Rubens Sambueza	(yellow card) 40'
MF	26	(Mexico) Juan Carlos Medina
MF	10	(Paraguay) Osvaldo Martínez		(substituted off) 76'
FW	9	(Mexico) Raúl Jiménez
FW	11	(Colombia) Luis Gabriel Rey		(substituted off) 80'
Substitutions:
GK	1	(Mexico) Hugo González
DF	16	(Mexico) Adrián Aldrete
MF	5	(Mexico) Jesús Molina
MF	8	(Colombia) Andrés Andrade
MF	15	(Mexico) Luis Ángel Mendoza		(substituted on) 76'
MF	18	(Mexico) Christian Bermúdez		(substituted on) 86'
FW	7	(Ecuador) Narciso Mina		(substituted on) 80'
Manager:
(Mexico) Miguel Herrera

Assistant referees:
Héctor Manuel Delgadillo (Coahuila)
Miguel Ángel Hernández (Puebla)
Fourth official:
Paul Delgadillo (Jalisco)

=== Second leg ===
15 December 2013
18:00 CST (UTC−6)

América	1–3	León
González 42' (o.g.)	Report	Boselli 13'; González 52'; Ed. Hernández 73'

Estadio Azteca, Mexico City
Attendance: 96,656
Referee: Roberto García Orozco (Mexico City)

León won 5–1 on aggregate.

América	León

GK	23	(Mexico) Moisés Muñoz
DF	19	(Mexico) Miguel Layún
DF	6	(Mexico) Juan Carlos Valenzuela		(substituted off) 28'
DF	2	(Mexico) Francisco Javier Rodríguez	(red card) 54'
DF	3	(Colombia) Aquivaldo Mosquera (c)	(yellow card) 24'
DF	22	(Mexico) Paul Aguilar
MF	14	(Argentina) Rubens Sambueza	(yellow card) 24'
MF	26	(Mexico) Juan Carlos Medina		(substituted off) 55'
MF	10	(Paraguay) Osvaldo Martínez
FW	9	(Mexico) Raúl Jiménez
FW	7	(Ecuador) Narciso Mina		(substituted off) 68'
Substitutions:
GK	1	(Mexico) Hugo González
DF	16	(Mexico) Adrián Aldrete		(substituted on) 28'
MF	5	(Mexico) Jesús Molina
MF	8	(Colombia) Andrés Andrade		(substituted on) 55'
MF	15	(Mexico) Luis Ángel Mendoza
MF	18	(Mexico) Christian Bermúdez
FW	11	(Colombia) Luis Gabriel Rey		(substituted on) 68'
Manager:
(Mexico) Miguel Herrera

GK	25	(United States) William Yarbrough	(yellow card) 51'
DF	7	(Mexico) Edwin Hernández
DF	35	(Mexico) Ignacio González
DF	19	(Mexico) Jonny Magallón
DF	4	(Mexico) Rafael Márquez (c)
MF	20	(Colombia) Eisner Loboa		(substituted off) 74'
MF	23	(Mexico) José Juan Vázquez
MF	27	(Mexico) Carlos Peña
MF	10	(Mexico) Luis Montes
FW	17	(Argentina) Mauro Boselli		(substituted off) 83'
FW	9	(Uruguay) Matías Britos		(substituted off) 61'
Substitutions:
GK	16	(Mexico) Christian Martínez
DF	2	(Mexico) Iván Pineda
DF	5	(Mexico) Fernando Navarro
MF	8	(Mexico) Elías Hernández		(substituted on) 83'
MF	11	(Colombia) Franco Arizala	(yellow card) 68'	(substituted on) 61'
MF	18	(Colombia) Hernán Burbano		(substituted on) 74'
FW	13	(Mexico) Mauricio Castañeda
Manager:
(Uruguay) Gustavo Matosas

Assistant referees:
José Luis Camargo (State of Mexico)
Alberto Morín Méndez (Chihuahua)
Fourth official:
Jorge Isaac Rojas (Mexico City)

== Statistics ==
=== Goalscorers ===
There were 49 goals scored in 14 matches, for an average of 3.5 goals per match.

5 goals

- (Argentina) Mauro Boselli (León)

4 goals

- (Colombia) Darwin Quintero (Santos Laguna)

3 goals

- (Mexico) Carlos Peña (León)
- (Mexico) Isaac Romo (Querétaro)

2 goals

- (Mexico) Éver Guzmán (Morelia)
- (Colombia) Aquivaldo Mosquera (América)
- (Mexico) Oribe Peralta (Santos Laguna)
- (Mexico) Alan Pulido (UANL)
- (Mexico) José Juan Vázquez (León)

1 goal

- (Colombia) Franco Arizala (León)
- (Paraguay) Édgar Benítez (Toluca)
- (Uruguay) Matías Britos (León)
- (Mexico) Isaác Brizuela (Toluca)
- (Colombia) Hernán Burbano (León)
- (Mexico) Alonso Escoboza (Santos Laguna)
- (Mexico) Francisco Gamboa (Toluca)
- (Argentina) Christian Giménez (Cruz Azul)
- (Mexico) Ignacio González (León)
- (Mexico) Edwin Hernández (León)
- (Mexico) Elías Hernández (León)
- (Mexico) Raúl Jiménez (América)
- (Mexico) Jesús Molina (América)
- (Ecuador) Jefferson Montero (Morelia)
- (Mexico) Luis Montes (León)
- (Mexico) Javier Orozco (Santos Laguna)
- (Argentina) Guido Pizarro (UANL)
- (Colombia) Luis Gabriel Rey (América)
- (Mexico) Juan Pablo Rodríguez (Santos Laguna)
- (Mexico) Óscar Rojas (Toluca)
- (Mexico) Juan Carlos Valenzuela (América)
- (Paraguay) Pablo Velázquez (Toluca)

1 own goal

- (Mexico) Ignacio González (for América)
- (Mexico) Jair Pereira (for Toluca)

=== Assists ===
3 assists

- (Colombia) Hernán Burbano (León)
- (Mexico) Oribe Peralta (Santos Laguna)

2 assists

- (Mexico) Isaác Brizuela (Toluca)
- (Mexico) Alonso Escoboza (Santos Laguna)
- (Argentina) Leandro Gracián (Querétaro)
- (Mexico) Luis Montes (León)
- (Mexico) Antonio Ríos (Toluca)
- (Argentina) Rubens Sambueza (América)

1 assist

- (Mexico) Paul Aguilar (América)
- (Colombia) Franco Arizala (León)
- (Mexico) Hugo Ayala (UANL)
- (Uruguay) Matías Britos (León)
- (Argentina) Mauro Cejas (Santos Laguna)
- (Spain) Marc Crosas (Santos Laguna)
- (Mexico) Miguel Layún (América)
- (Mexico) Rafael Márquez (León)
- (Paraguay) Osvaldo Martínez (América)
- (Mexico) Carlos Adrián Morales (Morelia)
- (Mexico) Sinha (Toluca)
- (Mexico) Antonio Olvera (Morelia)
- (Mexico) Enrique Palos (UANL)
- (Mexico) Carlos Peña (León)
- (Colombia) Darwin Quintero (Santos Laguna)
- (Mexico) Francisco Javier Rodríguez (América)
- (Mexico) Jorge Torres Nilo (UANL)
- (Mexico) Christian Valdez (Morelia)
- (Mexico) José Juan Vázquez (León)
