= Clausura 2014 Liga MX final phase =

Tournament details
- Dates: 30 April–18 May 2014
- Teams: 8

Tournament statistics
- Matches played: 14
- Goals scored: 47 (3.36 per match)
- Attendance: 365,323 (26,095 per match)

The Clausura 2014 Liga MX final phase commonly known as Liguilla (mini league) was played from 30 April 2014 to 18 May 2014. A total of eight teams competed in the final phase to decide the champions of the Clausura 2014 Liga MX season. Both finalists qualified to the 2014–15 CONCACAF Champions League.

== Qualified teams ==
Pos	Team	Pld	Pts
1	Cruz Azul	17	36
2	Toluca	17	32
3	UNAM	17	25
4	Santos Laguna	17	25
5	América	17	25
6	Pachuca	17	24
7	Tijuana	17	24
8	León	17	23

== Bracket ==
Quarterfinals
1	Cruz Azul	1	2	3
8	León (a)	1	2	3
2	Toluca	0	3	3
7	Tijuana	0	1	1
4	Santos Laguna (a)	3	3	6
5	América	5	1	6
3	UNAM	1	2	3
6	Pachuca	1	4	5

Semifinals
2	Toluca	0	0	0
8	León	1	1	2
4	Santos Laguna	0	4	4
6	Pachuca (a)	2	2	4

Finals
8	León (a.e.t.)	2	2	4
6	Pachuca	3	0	3

Notes

- If the two teams are tied after both legs, the higher seeded team advances.
- "Away goals" rule was applied in the play-off round, but not in the final.
- Both finalists qualified to the 2014–15 CONCACAF Champions League (champion in Pot A, runner-up in Pot B).

== Quarter-finals ==
Team 1	Agg.	Team 2	1st leg	2nd leg
León	3–3 (a)	Cruz Azul	1–1	2–2
Tijuana	1–3	Toluca	0–0	1–3
Pachuca	5–3	UNAM	1–1	4–2
América	6–6 (a)	Santos Laguna	5–3	1–3

=== Matches ===
30 April 2014
22:00 CDT (UTC−6)

León	1–1	Cruz Azul
Cardenas 20'	Report	Pavone 4'

Estadio León, León
Attendance: 27,523
Referee: César Arturo Ramos (Sinaloa)
3 May 2014
19:00 CDT (UTC−6)

Cruz Azul	2–2	León
Pavone 12'; Formica 21'	Report	Boselli 40'; Montes 59'

Estadio Azul, Mexico City
Attendance: 17,807
Referee: Fernando Guerrero (Mexico City)

3–3 on aggregate. León advanced on away goals.

1 May 2014
20:05 PDT (UTC−8)

Tijuana	0–0	Toluca
	Report

Estadio Caliente, Tijuana
Attendance: 20,133
Referee: Luis Enrique Santander (Guanajuato)
4 May 2014
12:00 CDT (UTC−6)

Toluca	3–1	Tijuana
Ríos 31'; Ponce 60'; Benítez 89'	Report	Benedetto 49'

Estadio Nemesio Díez, Toluca
Attendance: 13,549
Referee: Francisco Chacón (Mexico City)

Toluca won 3–1 on aggregate.

1 May 2014
20:00 CDT (UTC−6)

Pachuca	1–1	UNAM
Carreño 71'	Report	Cortés 90+4'

Estadio Hidalgo, Pachuca
Attendance: 25,920
Referee: Jesús Fabricio Morales (Sinaloa)
4 May 2014
17:00 CDT (UTC−6)

UNAM	2–4	Pachuca
Velarde 16'; Van Rankin 33'	Report	Valencia 12', 25', 47'; Rodríguez 55'

Estadio Olímpico Universitario, Mexico City
Attendance: 33,638
Referee: Marco Antonio Rodríguez (Mexico City)

Pachuca won 5–3 on aggregate.

30 April 2014
20:00 CDT (UTC−6)

América	5–3	Santos Laguna
Martínez 12'; Jiménez 59', 81', 87'; Sambueza 90+2'	Report	Salinas 26'; Quintero 48'; R. Rodríguez 54'

Estadio Azteca, Mexico City
Attendance: 42,925
Referee: Jorge Isaac Rojas (Mexico City)
3 May 2014
21:00 CDT (UTC−6)

Santos Laguna	3–1	América
Valenzuela 24' (o.g.); R. Rodríguez 83'; Rentería 87'		Sambueza 90'

Estadio Corona, Torreón
Attendance: 28,026
Referee: Roberto García Orozco (Mexico City)

6–6 on aggregate. Santos Laguna advanced on away goals.

== Semi-finals ==
Team 1	Agg.	Team 2	1st leg	2nd leg
León	2–0	Toluca	1–0	1–0
Pachuca	4–4 (a)	Santos Laguna	2–0	2–4

=== Matches ===
8 May 2014
20:06 CDT (UTC−6)

León	1–0	Toluca
Montes 24'	Report

Estadio León, León
Attendance: 24,818
Referee: César Arturo Ramos (Sinaloa)
11 May 2014
12:00 CDT (UTC−6)

Toluca	0–1	León
	Report	Peña 51'

Estadio Nemesio Díez, Toluca
Attendance: 20,184
Referee: Roberto García Orozco (Mexico City)

León won 2–0 on aggregate.

7 May 2014
20:30 CDT (UTC−6)

Pachuca	2–0	Santos Laguna
De Buen 44'; Rodríguez 64'	Report

Estadio Hidalgo, Pachuca
Attendance: 27,681
Referee: Francisco Chacón (Guanajuato)
10 May 2014
20:00 CDT (UTC−6)

Santos Laguna	4–2	Pachuca
Figueroa 11', 90+3'; J. P. Rodríguez 68' (pen.); Orozco 77'	Report	Valencia 27'; Villalpando 45+3'

Estadio Corona, Torreón
Attendance: 24,543
Referee: Marco Antonio Rodríguez (Mexico City)

4–4 on aggregate. Pachuca advanced on away goals.

== Finals ==
Team 1	Agg.	Team 2	1st leg	2nd leg
León	4–3	Pachuca	2–3	2–0 (a.e.t.)

=== First leg ===
15 May 2014
20:06 CDT (UTC−6)

León	2–3	Pachuca
Peña 34'; Herrera 77' (o.g.)	Report	Valencia 42', 61'; Lozano 69'

Estadio León, León
Attendance: 29,171
Referee: César Arturo Ramos (Sinaloa)

León	Pachuca

GK	25	(United States) William Yarbrough
DF	7	(Mexico) Edwin Hernández
DF	4	(Mexico) Rafael Márquez (c)	(yellow card) 89'
DF	35	(Mexico) Ignacio González	(yellow card) 50'
DF	19	(Mexico) Jonny Magallón		(substituted off) 67'
MF	23	(Mexico) José Juan Vázquez
MF	27	(Mexico) Carlos Peña	(yellow card) 73'	(substituted off) 83'
MF	6	(Mexico) José María Cárdenas	(yellow card) 74'
MF	10	(Mexico) Luis Montes		(substituted off) 66'
MF	20	(Colombia) Eisner Loboa
FW	17	(Argentina) Mauro Boselli
Substitutions:
GK	16	(Mexico) Christian Martínez
DF	5	(Mexico) Fernando Navarro
DF	21	(Mexico) Luis Delgado
MF	8	(Mexico) Elías Hernández		(substituted on) 66'
MF	29	(Mexico) Aldo Rocha
FW	1	(Mexico) Miguel Sabah		(substituted on) 67'
FW	13	(Mexico) Mauricio Castañeda		(substituted on) 83'
Manager:
(Uruguay) Gustavo Matosas

GK	21	(Mexico) Óscar Pérez (c)
DF	5	(Mexico) Daniel Arreola
DF	24	(Mexico) Miguel Herrera	(yellow card) 17'
DF	27	(Mexico) Hugo Rodríguez
DF	16	(Mexico) Jorge Hernández
MF	25	(Mexico) Jürgen Damm
MF	23	(Mexico) Dieter Villalpando
MF	22	(Mexico) Rodolfo Pizarro
MF	70	(Mexico) Hirving Lozano		(substituted off) 72'
FW	14	(Ecuador) Enner Valencia	(yellow card) 50'	(substituted off) 67'
FW	19	(Mexico) Darío Carreño		(substituted off) 35'
Substitutions:
GK	30	(Mexico) Rodolfo Cota
DF	2	(Colombia) Efraín Cortés		(substituted on) 72'
DF	6	(Mexico) Diego de Buen
MF	13	(Mexico) Édgar Andrade
MF	18	(Mexico) Érick Gutiérrez		(substituted on) 35'
FW	9	(Mexico) Enrique Esqueda	(yellow card) 90+6'	(substituted on) 67'
FW	26	(Colombia) Jhon Pajoy
Manager:
(Mexico) Enrique Meza

Assistant referees:
Alberto Morín Méndez (Chihuahua)
Jesús Sevilla Palafox (Jalisco)
Fourth official:
Luis Enrique Santander (Guanajuato)

=== Second leg ===
18 May 2014
20:00 CDT (UTC−6)

Pachuca	0–2 (a.e.t.)	León
	Report	Boselli 66'; González 112'

Estadio Hidalgo, Pachuca
Attendance: 29,405
Referee: Francisco Chacón (Guanajuato)

León won 4–3 on aggregate.

Pachuca	León

GK	21	(Mexico) Óscar Pérez (c)
DF	11	(Ecuador) Walter Ayoví
DF	24	(Mexico) Miguel Herrera
DF	27	(Mexico) Hugo Rodríguez
DF	22	(Mexico) Rodolfo Pizarro
MF	16	(Mexico) Jorge Hernández	(substituted off) 83'
MF	18	(Mexico) Érick Gutiérrez	(substituted off) 65'
MF	26	(Colombia) Jhon Pajoy	(substituted off) 46'
MF	23	(Mexico) Dieter Villalpando
MF	70	(Mexico) Hirving Lozano
FW	14	(Ecuador) Enner Valencia
Substitutions:
GK	30	(Mexico) Rodolfo Cota
DF	2	(Colombia) Efraín Cortés
DF	6	(Mexico) Diego de Buen	(substituted on) 65'
MF	5	(Mexico) Daniel Arreola	(substituted on) 83'
MF	25	(Mexico) Jürgen Damm	(substituted on) 46'
FW	9	(Mexico) Enrique Esqueda
FW	19	(Mexico) Darío Carreño
Manager:
(Mexico) Enrique Meza

GK	25	(United States) William Yarbrough
DF	7	(Mexico) Edwin Hernández
DF	4	(Mexico) Rafael Márquez (c)	(yellow card) 41'
DF	35	(Mexico) Ignacio González
DF	19	(Mexico) Jonny Magallón		(substituted off) 6'
MF	23	(Mexico) José Juan Vázquez
MF	27	(Mexico) Carlos Peña
MF	8	(Mexico) Elías Hernández
MF	10	(Mexico) Luis Montes
MF	11	(Colombia) Franco Arizala		(substituted off) 8'
FW	17	(Argentina) Mauro Boselli		(substituted off) 110'
Substitutions:
GK	16	(Mexico) Christian Martínez
DF	5	(Mexico) Fernando Navarro
MF	6	(Mexico) José María Cárdenas		(substituted on) 8'
MF	20	(Colombia) Eisner Loboa	(yellow card) 118'	(substituted on) 6'
MF	29	(Mexico) Aldo Rocha
FW	1	(Mexico) Miguel Sabah	(yellow card) 118'	(substituted on) 110'
FW	13	(Mexico) Mauricio Castañeda
Manager:
(Uruguay) Gustavo Matosas

Assistant referees:
Marvin Cesar Torrentera (Mexico City)
Juan Joel Rangel (Mexico City)
Fourth official:
Fernando Guerrero (Mexico City)

== Statistics ==
=== Goalscorers ===
There were 47 goals scored in 14 matches, for an average of 3.36 goals per match.

6 goals

- (Ecuador) Enner Valencia (Pachuca)

3 goals

- (Mexico) Raúl Jiménez (América)

2 goals

- (Argentina) Mauro Boselli (León)
- (Mexico) Rafael Figueroa (Santos Laguna)
- (Mexico) Luis Montes (León)
- (Argentina) Mariano Pavone (Cruz Azul)
- (Mexico) Carlos Peña (León)
- (Mexico) Hugo Rodríguez (Pachuca)
- (Uruguay) Ribair Rodríguez (Santos Laguna)
- (Argentina) Rubens Sambueza (América)

1 goal

- (Argentina) Darío Benedetto (Tijuana)
- (Paraguay) Edgar Benítez (Toluca)
- (Mexico) Darío Carreño (Pachuca)
- (Mexico) Javier Cortés (UNAM)
- (Mexico) José María Cárdenas (León)
- (Mexico) Diego de Buen (Pachuca)
- (Argentina) Mauro Formica (Cruz Azul)
- (Mexico) Ignacio González (León)
- (Mexico) Hirving Lozano (Pachuca)
- (Paraguay) Osvaldo Martínez (América)
- (Mexico) Javier Orozco (Santos Laguna)
- (Mexico) Miguel Ángel Ponce (Toluca)
- (Colombia) Darwin Quintero (Santos Laguna)
- (Colombia) Andrés Rentería (Santos Laguna)
- (Mexico) Juan Pablo Rodríguez (Santos Laguna)
- (Mexico) Antonio Ríos (Toluca)
- (Mexico) Rodolfo Salinas (Santos Laguna)
- (Mexico) Josecarlos Van Rankin (UNAM)
- (Mexico) Efraín Velarde (UNAM)
- (Mexico) Dieter Villalpando (Pachuca)

1 own goal

- (Mexico) Miguel Herrera (against León)
- (Mexico) Juan Carlos Valenzuela (against Santos Laguna)

=== Assists ===
3 assists

- (Mexico) Alonso Escoboza (Santos Laguna)
- (Mexico) Dieter Villalpando (Pachuca)

2 assists

- (Mexico) José María Cárdenas (León)
- (Mexico) Edwin Hernández (León)
- (Mexico) Luis Ángel Mendoza (América)
- (Mexico) Luis Montes (León)

1 assist

- (Colombia) Andrés Andrade (América)
- (Argentina) Mauro Boselli (León)
- (Mexico) Rogelio Chávez (Cruz Azul)
- (Mexico) Miguel Herrera (Pachuca)
- (Argentina) Daniel Ludueña (UNAM)
- (Mexico) Juan Carlos Medina (América)
- (Colombia) Jhon Pajoy (Pachuca)
- (Mexico) Carlos Peña (León)
- (Mexico) Oribe Peralta (Santos Laguna)
- (Colombia) Darwin Quintero (Santos Laguna)
- (Colombia) Andrés Rentería (Santos Laguna)
- (Argentina) Andrés Ríos (América)
- (Mexico) Juan Pablo Rodríguez (Santos Laguna)
- (Ecuador) Joao Rojas (Cruz Azul)
