= 2010–11 Tigres UANL season =

The 2010–11 UANL season was the 64th professional season of Mexico's top-flight football league. The season is split into two tournaments—the Torneo Apertura and the Torneo Clausura—each with identical formats and each contested by the same eighteen teams. UANL will begin their season on July 24, 2010 against Querétaro, UANL played their homes games on Saturdays at 7:00pm.

== Torneo Apertura ==
=== Squad ===
Note: Flags indicate national team as defined under FIFA eligibility rules; some limited exceptions apply. Players may hold more than one non-FIFA nationality.

No.	Pos.	Nation	Player
1	GK	MEX	Cirilo Saucedo
2	DF	MEX	José Antonio Castro
3	DF	BRA	Juninho
4	DF	MEX	Hugo Ayala
5	DF	MEX	Jesús Molina
6	MF	MEX	Jorge Torres Nilo
8	MF	MEX	Lucas Ayala
9	FW	BRA	Itamar Batista (captain)
10	MF	BRA	Éverton Cardoso
11	MF	ARG	Damián Álvarez
13	MF	MEX	Antonio Sancho
14	DF	MEX	Alfredo González Tahuilán
15	MF	MEX	Manuel Viniegra
16	MF	ARG	Lucas Lobos

No.	Pos.	Nation	Player
17	MF	MEX	David Toledo
18	MF	MEX	Francisco Acuña
19	FW	MEX	Armando Pulido
20	MF	MEX	Alejandro Argüello
21	DF	MEX	Jonathan de León
23	DF	MEX	Israel Sabdi Jiménez
24	DF	MEX	José Arturo Rivas
25	GK	MEX	Enrique Palos
26	FW	MEX	Francisco Fonseca
27	DF	MEX	Omar Trujillo
28	MF	MEX	Alberto Acosta
29	MF	MEX	Jesús Dueñas
30	GK	MEX	Aarón Fernández
34	FW	MEX	Alan Pulido

=== Regular season ===
July 24, 2010 Round 1	UANL	0 – 1	Querétaro	Estadio Universitario, San Nicolás
7:00pm		Report	Blanco 45'	Referee: Ricardo Arellano

July 30, 2010 Round 2	Necaxa	0 – 2	UANL	Estadio Victoria, Aguascalientes
8:00pm		Report	Lobos 37'; Acuña 41'	Referee: Jaime Herrera Garduño

August 7, 2010 Round 3	UANL	1 – 1	América	Estadio Universitario, San Nicolás
7:00pm	Álvarez 41'	Report	Montenegro 76'	Referee: Mauricio Morales

August 15, 2010 Round 4	Toluca	1 – 1	UANL	Estadio Nemesio Díez, Toluca
12:00pm	Ríos 61'	Report	Itamar 90' (pen.)	Referee: Fabricio Morales

August 21, 2010 Round 5	UANL	1 – 0	Santos Laguna	Estadio Universitario, San Nicolás
7:00pm	Juninho 8'	Report		Referee: Marco Antonio Rodríguez

August 28, 2010 Round 6	Cruz Azul	3 – 2	UANL	Estadio Azul, Mexico City
5:00pm	Villa 10'; Orozco 42'; Vela 53'	Report	Itamar 12', 56'	Referee: Francisco Chacón

September 11, 2010 Round 7	UANL	0 – 1	Monterrey	Estadio Universitario, San Nicolás
7:00pm		Report	Suazo 46'	Referee: Armando Archundia

September 19, 2010 Round 8	Puebla	1 – 3	UANL	Estadio Cuauhtémoc, Puebla
12:00pm	Pereyra 64'	Report	Itamar 22', 28', 36'	Referee: Roberto García

September 26, 2010 Round 9	UANL	1 – 1	Guadalajara	Estadio Universitario, San Nicolás
12:00pm	Acuña 46'	Report	Ponce 71'	Referee: Jorge Isaac Rojas

October 2, 2010 Round 10	San Luis	1 – 0	UANL	Estadio Alfonso Lastras, San Luis Potosí
8:45pm	Arce 47'	Report		Referee: Paul Delgadillo

October 9, 2010 Round 11	UANL	5 – 0	Estudiantes Tecos	Estadio Universitario, San Nicolás
7:00pm	Juninho 15'; Itamar 18', 66'; Lobos 26'; Álvarez 82'	Report		Referee: Miguel Ángel Flores

October 16, 2010 Round 12	Atlante	1 – 1	UANL	Estadio Andrés Quintana Roo, Cancún
9:00pm	Fano 10'	Report	Carevic 47' (o.g.)	Referee: Jorge Gasso

October 23, 2010 Round 13	UANL	2 – 0	UNAM	Estadio Universitario, San Nicolás
7:00pm	Juninho 22'; Álvarez 77'	Report		Referee: Roberto García

October 26, 2010 Round 14	Pachuca	2 – 3	UANL	Estadio Hidalgo, Pachuca
8:00pm	Cvitanich 45', 57'	Report	Acuña 62'; Lobos 76' (pen.); Álvarez 79'	Referee: Marco Antonio Rodríguez

October 30, 2010 Round 15	UANL	0 – 0	Chiapas	Estadio Universitario, San Nicolás
7:00pm		Report		Referee: Mauricio Rafael Morales

November 6, 2010 Round 16	UANL	0 – 1	Morelia	Estadio Universitario, San Nicolás
7:00pm		Report	Dorame 72'	Referee: Armando Archundia

November 13, 2010 Round 17	Atlas	2 – 2	UANL	Estadio Jalisco, Guadalajara
8:45pm	Moreno 39' (pen.), 63' (pen.)	Report	Lobos 15'; Batista 30'	Referee: Francisco Chacón

=== Goalscorers ===
Position	Nation	Name	Goals scored
1	(Brazil)	Itamar	9
2	(Argentina)	Damián Álvarez	4
3	(Argentina)	Lucas Lobos	4
2	(Mexico)	Francisco Acuña	3
3	(Brazil)	Juninho	3
3		Own Goal	1
TOTAL			24

=== Transfers ===
==== In ====
#	Pos	Player	From	Fee	Date	Notes

==== Out ====
Pos	Player	To	Fee	Date	Notes

=== Results ===
==== Results summary ====
Overall								Home						Away					
Pld	W	D	L	GF	GA	GD	Pts	W	D	L	GF	GA	GD	W	D	L	GF	GA	GD
17	6	6	5	24	16	+8	24	3	3	3	10	5	+5	3	3	2	14	11	+3

Last updated: 29 January 2011.
Source: Apertura 2010 results

==== Results by round ====
Round	1	2	3	4	5	6	7	8	9	10	11	12	13	14	15	16	17
Ground	H	A	H	A	H	A	H	A	H	A	H	A	H	A	H	H	A
Result	L	W	D	D	W	L	L	W	D	L	W	D	W	W	D	L	D
Position	14	7	8	8	6	9	12	8	9	11	8	8	6	4	6	7	9

Updated to match(es) played on 29 January 2011. Source: Apertura 2010 results and mediotiempo.com
A = Away; H = Home; W = Win; D = Draw; L = Loss

== Torneo Clausura ==
=== Squad ===
Note: Flags indicate national team as defined under FIFA eligibility rules; some limited exceptions apply. Players may hold more than one non-FIFA nationality.

No.	Pos.	Nation	Player
1	GK	MEX	Cirilo Saucedo
3	DF	BRA	Juninho (Team Vice-Captain)
4	DF	MEX	Hugo Ayala
5	DF	MEX	Jesús Molina
6	DF	MEX	Jorge Torres Nilo
8	DF	USA	Jonathan Bornstein
9	FW	CHI	Héctor Mancilla
10	FW	BRA	Danilinho
11	MF	ARG	Damián Álvarez
13	MF	MEX	Antonio Sancho (Club captain)
15	MF	MEX	Manuel Viniegra
16	MF	ARG	Lucas Lobos (Team captain)
17	MF	MEX	David Toledo

No.	Pos.	Nation	Player
18	MF	MEX	Francisco Acuña
20	FW	MEX	Carlos Ochoa
21	DF	MEX	Antonio Zacarías
23	DF	MEX	Israel Jiménez
24	DF	MEX	José Arturo Rivas
25	GK	MEX	Enrique Palos
27	DF	MEX	Omar Trujillo
28	MF	MEX	Alberto Acosta
29	MF	MEX	Jesús Dueñas
30	GK	MEX	Aarón Fernández
34	FW	MEX	Alan Pulido
42	FW	MEX	Luis Ángel Mendoza
45	FW	MEX	Leopoldo Moráles

=== Regular season ===
January 8, 2011 Round 1	Querétaro	2 – 2	UANL	Estadio Corregidora, Querétaro
5:00pm	Bueno 19', 56'	Report	Danilinho 71'; Lobos 77'	Referee: Francisco Chacón

January 15, 2011 Round 2	UANL	1 – 0	Necaxa	Estadio Universitario, San Nicolás
7:00pm	Mancilla 65' (pen.)	Report		Referee: Marco Antonio Rodríguez

January 23, 2011 Round 3	América	1 – 2	UANL	Estadio Azteca, Mexico City
4:00pm	Montenegro 51'	Report	Lobos 35'; Mancilla 90+2'	Referee: Ricardo Arellano

January 29, 2011 Round 4	UANL	0 – 1	Toluca	Estadio Universitario, San Nicolás
7:00pm		Report	Esquivel 53'	Referee: Jaime Herrera

February 5, 2011 Round 5	Santos Laguna	0 – 2	UANL	Estadio Corona, Torreón
7:00pm		Report	Mancilla 8'; Juninho 44'	Referee: Isaac Rojas

February 12, 2011 Round 6	UANL	2 – 0	Cruz Azul	Estadio Universitario, San Nicolás
7:00pm	Mancilla 68'; Danilinho 90+2'	Report		Referee: Juan Genaro Medrano

February 19, 2011 Round 7	Monterrey	0 – 0	UANL	Estadio Tecnológico, Monterrey
5:00pm		Report		Referee: Miguel Ángel Ortega

February 26, 2011 Round 8	UANL	3 – 0	Puebla	Estadio Universitario, San Nicolás
7:00pm	Mancilla 24'; Álvarez 42'; Ochoa 87'	Report		Referee: Miguel Ángel Chacón

March 5, 2011 Round 9	Guadalajara	0 – 0	UANL	Estadio Omnilife, Zapopan
7:00pm		Report		Referee: Marco Antonio Rodríguez

March 12, 2011 Round 10	UANL	1 – 1	San Luis	Estadio Universitario, San Nicolás
7:00pm	Mancilla 45' (pen.)	Report	Aguirre 59'	Referee: Paul Enrique Delgadillo

March 18, 2011 Round 11	Estudiantes Tecos	0 – 0	UANL	Estadio Tres de Marzo, Zapopan
8:10pm		Report		Referee: Mauricio Morales

April 2, 2011 Round 12	UANL	2 – 0	Atlante	Estadio Universitario, San Nicolás
7:00pm	Molina 54'; Acuña 85'	Report		Referee: Miguel Ángel Flores

April 10, 2011 Round 13	UNAM	2 – 0	UANL	Estadio Olímpico Universitario, Mexico City
12:00pm	Castro 89'; Cacho 90+4'	Report		Referee: Miguel Ángel Ortega

April 13, 2011 Round 14	UANL	4 – 2	Pachuca	Estadio Universitario, San Nicolás
8:45pm	Mancilla 43', 58'; Lobos 70'; Pulido 89'	Report	Arizala 8'; Gómez 90'	Referee: Ricardo Arellano

April 16, 2011 Round 15	Chiapas	0 – 1	UANL	Estadio Victor Manuel Reyna, Tuxtla Gutierrez
5:00pm		Report	Álvarez 78'	Referee: Juan Genaro Medrano

April 24, 2011 Round 16	Morelia	0 – 3	UANL	Estadio Morelos, Morelia
12:00pm		Report	Lobos 14'; Pulido 84'; Acosta 87'	Referee: Paul Delgadillo

April 30, 2011 Round 17	UANL	3 – 0	Atlas	Estadio Universitario, San Nicolás
7:00pm	Mancilla 5'; Lobos 46'; Pulido 89'	Report		Referee: Francisco Chacón

==== Final phase ====
May 4, 2011 Quarterfinals	Guadalajara	3 – 1	UANL	Estadio Omnilife, Zapopan
7:00pm	Arellano 40' de Luna 58'; Fabián 66' (pen.)	Report	Molina 48'	Referee: Ricardo Arellano

May 7, 2011 Quarterfinals	UANL	1 – 1	Guadalajara	Estadio Universitario, San Nicolás
7:00pm	Mancilla 64'	Report	Reynoso 79'	Referee: Mauricio Morales

Guadalajara won 4–2 on aggregate

=== Goalscorers ===
Position	Nation	Name	Goals scored
1	(Chile)	Héctor Mancilla	10
2	(Argentina)	Lucas Lobos	5
3	(Mexico)	Alán Pulido	3
4	(Argentina)	Damián Álvarez	2
4	(Mexico)	Jesús Molina	2
4	(Brazil)	Danilinho	2
7	(Mexico)	Carlos Ochoa	1
7	(Mexico)	Alberto Acosta	1
7	(Mexico)	Francisco Acuña	1
7	(Brazil)	Juninho	1
TOTAL			28

=== Results ===
==== Results summary ====
Overall								Home						Away					
Pld	W	D	L	GF	GA	GD	Pts	W	D	L	GF	GA	GD	W	D	L	GF	GA	GD
17	10	5	2	26	9	+17	35	6	1	1	16	4	+12	4	4	1	10	5	+5

Last updated: 6 May 2011.
Source: Clausura 2011 results

==== Results by round ====
Round	1	2	3	4	5	6	7	8	9	10	11	12	13	14	15	16	17
Ground	A	H	A	H	A	H	A	H	A	H	A	H	A	H	A	A	H
Result	D	W	W	L	W	W	D	W	D	D	D	W	L	W	W	W	W
Position	8	6	3	6	6	1	2	2	3	2	4	2	3	3	3	2	1

Updated to match(es) played on 24 April 2011. Source: Clausura 2011 results and mediotiempo.com
A = Away; H = Home; W = Win; D = Draw; L = Loss
