= 2010–11 Mexican Primera División =

Primera División de México
- Season: 2010–11
- Champions: Apertura: Monterrey (4th title); Clausura: UNAM (7th title)
- Relegated: Necaxa
- Champions League: Monterrey; UNAM; Santos Laguna; Morelia
- Copa Libertadores: América; San Luis; Jaguares
- SuperLiga: Pachuca; Morelia; Puebla; UNAM
- Matches: 320
- Goals: 823 (2.57 per match)
- Top goalscorer: Apertura: Christian Benítez (16 goals); Clausura: Ángel Reyna (13 goals)
- Biggest home win: Apertura: Morelia 6–0 Querétaro (August 8, 2010); Clausura: Atlas 5-0 Morelia (January 8, 2011)
- Biggest away win: Apertura: Atlante 1–4 Santos Laguna (July 24, 2010); Clausura: Querétaro 0-5 Toluca (February 12, 2011) and Toluca 1-6 Morelia (March 6, 2011)
- Highest scoring: Apertura: Monterrey 5–2 UNAM (August 14, 2010); Querétaro 5–2 Santos Laguna (September 11, 2010); Clausura: América 5-4 Puebla (April 3, 2011)
- Longest winning run: Apertura: 5 games: Cruz Azul (August 14–September 24, 2010); Clausura: 4 games UNAM (Feb 18-Mar 20, 2011); UANL (Apr 13-Apr 30, 2011); Morelia (Feb 13-Mar 13, 2011)
- Longest unbeaten run: Apertura: 13 games: Monterrey (July 24–October 27, 2010); Clausura: 11 games UNAM (Jan 9-Apr 2, 2011)
- Longest winless run: Apertura: 8 games: Atlas (July 25–September 25, 2010); Clausura: 10 games San Luis (Feb 2-Apr 23, 2011)
- Longest losing run: Apertura: 4 games: Atlas (August 21–September 25, 2010); Clausura: Jaguares (Jan 23-Feb 26, 2011)

The 2010–11 Primera División Profesional is the 64th professional season top-flight football league. The season is split into two parts Apertura and Clausura each of which includes a tournament —the Torneo Apertura and the Torneo Clausura. Each part has an identical format and each is contested by the same eighteen teams.

== Clubs ==
Locations of the 2010–11 Primera División teams

Eighteen teams return for this season. Indios de Ciudad Juárez was relegated the previous season after accumulated the lowest coefficient over the past three seasons. Necaxa won promotion into the first division, returning after one year in the Liga de Ascenso.

Club	Home City	Stadium	Capacity
América	Mexico City	Azteca	105,000
Atlante	Cancún	Andrés Quintana Roo	20,000
Atlas	Guadalajara	Jalisco	56,700
Cruz Azul	Mexico City	Estadio Azul	35,000
Estudiantes Tecos	Zapopan	3 de Marzo	30,000
Guadalajara	Guadalajara	Omnilife	45,500
Jaguares	Tuxtla Gutiérrez	Víctor Manuel Reyna	25,000
Monterrey	Monterrey	Tecnológico	38,000
Morelia	Morelia	Morelos	41,500
Necaxa	Aguascalientes	Victoria	28,000
Pachuca	Pachuca	Hidalgo	30,000
Puebla	Puebla	Cuauhtémoc	42,650
Querétaro	Querétaro	La Corregidora	40,785
San Luis	San Luis Potosí	Alfonso Lastras Ramírez	24,000
Santos Laguna	Torreón	Corona	30,000
Toluca	Toluca	Nemesio Díez	27,000
UANL	San Nicolás	Universitario	45,000
UNAM	Mexico City	Olímpico Universitario	63,000

=== Managerial changes ===
Team	Outgoing manager	Manner of departure	Date of vacancy	Replaced by	Date of appointment	Position in table
Pre-season changes
América	Jesús Ramírez	Sacked	June 30, 2010	Manuel Lapuente	July 1, 2010	6th
Atlante	José Guadalupe Cruz	End of contract	June 30, 2010	René Isidoro García	July 1, 2010	16th
Querétaro	Carlos Reinoso	End of contract	June 30, 2010	Ángel David Comizzo	July 1, 2010	11th
Jaguares	Pablo Marini	Sacked	June 30, 2010	José Guadalupe Cruz	July 1, 2010	12th
UNAM	Ricardo Ferretti	End of contract	June 30, 2010	Guillermo Vázquez	July 1, 2010	4th
UANL	Daniel Guzmán	Sacked	June 30, 2010	Ricardo Ferretti	July 1, 2010	15th
Apertura changes
Pachuca	Guillermo Rivarola	Resigned	August 16, 2010	Pablo Marini	August 18, 2010	13th
Atlas	Carlos Ischia	Sacked	August 23, 2010	José Luis Mata	August 24, 2010	18th
Puebla	José Luis Sánchez Solá	Resigned	August 23, 2010	Eduardo Fentanes	August 24, 2010	8th
Necaxa	Omar Arellano Nuño	Sacked	August 31, 2010	Daniel Brailovsky	September 1, 2010	13th
Estudiantes Tecos	Miguel Herrera	Sacked	September 6, 2010	Eduardo Acevedo	September 8, 2010	16th
Atlante	René Isidoro García	Sacked	September 13, 2010	Eduardo Bacas	September 13, 2010	17th
Puebla	Eduardo Fentanes	Resigned	September 13, 2010	José Luis Trejo	September 14, 2010	6th
Atlas	José Luis Mata	Sacked	October 15, 2010	Benjamín Galindo	October 15, 2010	18th
Inter-tournament changes
Querétaro	Ángel David Comizzo	End of contract	December 31, 2010	Gustavo Matosas	January 1, 2011	14th
Estudiantes Tecos	Eduardo Acevedo	Sacked	December 31, 2010	José Luis Sánchez Solá	January 1, 2011	17th
Atlante	Eduardo Bacas	Sacked	December 31, 2010	Miguel Herrera	January 1, 2011	16th
Toluca	José Manuel de la Torre	End of contract	December 31, 2010	Sergio Lugo	January 1, 2011	11th
Clausura changes
América	Manuel Lapuente	Sacked	January 25, 2011	Carlos Reinoso	January 25, 2011	16th
Necaxa	Daniel Brailovsky	Sacked	January 30, 2011	Sergio Bueno	January 31, 2011	18th
Puebla	José Luis Trejo	Sacked	February 15, 2011	Héctor Hugo Eugui	February 15, 2011	16th
Santos	Rubén Omar Romano	Sacked	February 20, 2011	Diego Cocca	February 21, 2011	12th
Pachuca	Pablo Marini	Resigned	March 4, 2011	Efraín Flores	March 8, 2011	15th

== Torneo Apertura ==
The 2010 Torneo Apertura began on July 23, 2010, and ended on December 5, 2010.

=== Regular phase ===
==== League table ====
Pos	Team	Pld	W	D	L	GF	GA	GD	Pts	Qualification
1	Cruz Azul	17	12	3	2	33	13	+20	39	2010-11 CONCACAF Champions League
2	Monterrey	17	9	5	3	29	20	+9	32	2010-11 CONCACAF Champions League
3	Santos Laguna	17	9	3	5	28	19	+9	30	2010-11 CONCACAF Champions League
4	América	17	7	6	4	22	16	+6	27	2011 Copa Libertadores Second Stage
5	San Luis	17	8	2	7	21	19	+2	26	2011 Copa Libertadores Second Stage
6	Chiapas	17	6	7	4	21	14	+7	25	2011 Copa Libertadores First Stage
7	Pachuca	17	7	4	6	27	28	−1	25	
8	UNAM	17	7	4	6	23	24	−1	25	
9	UANL	17	6	6	5	24	16	+8	24	
10	Guadalajara	17	4	10	3	16	15	+1	22	
11	Toluca	17	5	7	5	18	20	−2	22	2010-11 CONCACAF Champions League
12	Morelia	17	5	6	6	17	16	+1	21	
13	Puebla	17	5	4	8	21	26	−5	19	
14	Querétaro	17	5	4	8	18	28	−10	19	
15	Necaxa	17	4	4	9	14	21	−7	16	
16	Atlante	17	4	4	9	17	27	−10	16	
17	Estudiantes Tecos	17	4	3	10	18	36	−18	15	
18	Atlas	17	3	4	10	18	27	−9	13	

==== Group standings ====
Group 1
Pos	Team	Pld	W	D	L	GF	GA	GD	Pts	Qualification
1	Monterrey	17	9	5	3	29	20	+9	32	Advanced to the Final Phase
2	Santos Laguna	17	9	3	5	29	19	+10	30	Advanced to the Final Phase
3	UANL	17	6	6	5	24	16	+8	24	
4	Guadalajara	17	4	10	3	16	15	+1	22	
5	Necaxa	17	4	4	9	14	21	−7	16	
6	Estudiantes Tecos	17	4	3	10	18	36	−18	15	

Group 2
Pos	Team	Pld	W	D	L	GF	GA	GD	Pts	Qualification
1	América	17	7	6	4	22	16	+6	27	Advanced to the Final Phase
2	San Luis	17	8	2	7	21	19	+2	26	Advanced to the Final Phase
3	Pachuca	17	7	4	6	27	28	−1	25	Advanced to the Final Phase
4	Toluca	17	5	7	5	18	20	−2	22	
5	Atlante	17	4	4	9	17	27	−10	16	
6	Atlas	17	3	4	10	18	27	−9	13	

Group 3
Pos	Team	Pld	W	D	L	GF	GA	GD	Pts	Qualification
1	Cruz Azul	17	12	3	2	33	13	+20	39	Advanced to the Final Phase
2	Chiapas	17	6	7	4	21	14	+7	25	Advanced to the Final Phase
3	UNAM	17	7	4	6	23	24	−1	25	Advanced to the Final Phase
4	Morelia	17	5	6	6	17	16	+1	21	
5	Puebla	17	5	4	8	21	26	−5	19	
6	Querétaro	17	5	4	8	18	28	−10	19	

=== Results ===
Home \ Away	AMÉ	ATE	ATL	CRU	EST	GUA	CHI	MON	MOR	NEC	PAC	PUE	QUE	SLU	SLA	TOL	UNL	UNM
América			1–1		4–1	0–0	3–0	0–0		1–1					3–2			0–1
Atlante	0–1				0–1	2–1		1–2	2–0		1–3		1–0		1–4		1–1	
Atlas		3–1		1–3						0–1	1–2	1–0		2–1		0–1	2–2	
Cruz Azul	1–0	2–0									4–1	1–0	3–0	1–0	3–0		3–2	
Estudiantes Tecos			2–1	0–3			0–0		1–1	0–2		1–3		3–2		4–2		2–2
Guadalajara			2–2	0–0	3–0		0–3		0–1	1–0		0–0				0–0		0–0
Chiapas		2–0	2–1	2–3					0–0	1–1	2–0	4–0		2–1		1–1		
Monterrey			2–0	2–4	3–2	2–3	1–1			2–1						2–0		5–2
Morelia	0–2		1–0	1–1				0–2		1–0		3–3	6–0		0–0	1–2		
Necaxa		1–2		2–1							1–2	1–0	1–1	0–2		1–1	0–2	
Pachuca	3–0				3–1	1–1		2–2	1–1				2–1		0–3		2–3	3–2
Puebla	2–2	1–1						2–0			3–1		2–0	2–1	0–1		1–3	
Querétaro	0–1		2–1		1–0	2–2	1–1	0–0							5–2			2–1
San Luis	1–2	2–1				0–1		1–1	1–0		1–0		3–2		1–1		1–0	
Santos Laguna			3–1		1–0	1–1	1–0	1–2		2–1						2–0		4–0
Toluca	2–1	1–1		0–0							1–1	2–1	2–0	1–2			1–1	
UANL	1–1				5–0	1–1	0–0	0–1	0–1				0–1		1–0			2–0
UNAM		2–2	1–1	2–0			1–0		1–0	2–0		4–1		0–1		2–1		

Updated to match(es) played on October 30, 2010. Source: FeMexFut (in Spanish)
Legend: Blue = home team win; Yellow = draw; Red = away team win.

=== Final phase (Liguilla) ===
Quarterfinals
1	Cruz Azul	2	0	2
8	UNAM	1	2	3
2	Monterrey	1	3	4
7	Pachuca	1	3	4
3	Santos Laguna	1	1	2
6	Jaguares	1	0	1
4	América	0	4	4
5	San Luis	0	1	1

Semifinals
2	Monterrey	0	2	2
8	UNAM	0	0	0
3	Santos Laguna	2	3	5
4	América	1	3	4

Finals
2	Monterrey	2	3	5
3	Santos Laguna	3	0	3

Champions

4th title

Notes

- If the two teams are tied after both legs, the higher seeded team advances.
- Both finalist qualify to the 2011–12 CONCACAF Champions League. The champion qualifies directly to the Group Stage, while the runner-up qualifies to the Preliminary Round.

=== Top goalscorers ===
Pos	Player	Club	Goals
1	(Ecuador) Christian Benítez	Santos Laguna	16
2	(Chile) Humberto Suazo	Monterrey	15
3	(Peru) Johan Fano	Atlante	9
3	(Brazil) Itamar	UANL	9
5	(Uruguay) Sergio Blanco	Querétaro	8
5	(Argentina) Darío Cvitanich	Pachuca	8
5	(Argentina) Christian Giménez	Cruz Azul	8
5	(Argentina) Gabriel Pereyra	Puebla	8
5	(Mexico) Matías Vuoso	América	8
10	(Argentina) Mauro Cejas	Estudiantes Tecos	7
10	(Argentina) Alfredo Moreno	Atlas	7
10	(Mexico) Carlos Ochoa	Jaguares	7
10	(Mexico) Miguel Sabah	Morelia	7

== Torneo Clausura ==
The 2011 Torneo Clausura began on January 7, 2011, and ended on May 22, 2011.

=== Regular phase ===
==== League table ====
Pos	Team	Pld	W	D	L	GF	GA	GD	Pts
1	UANL	17	10	5	2	26	9	+17	35
2	UNAM	17	10	5	2	27	13	+14	35
3	Morelia	17	9	4	4	31	24	+7	31
4	Atlante	17	8	3	6	28	17	+11	27
5	Cruz Azul	17	7	5	5	25	20	+5	26
6	América	17	8	2	7	31	28	+3	26
7	Monterrey	17	7	5	5	23	20	+3	26
8	Guadalajara	17	6	7	4	23	15	+8	25
9	Santos Laguna	17	7	2	8	23	23	0	23
10	Atlas	17	6	5	6	19	19	0	23
11	San Luis	17	4	9	4	20	18	+2	21
12	Toluca	17	5	6	6	28	27	+1	21
13	Pachuca	17	4	6	7	16	25	−9	18
14	Puebla	17	5	3	9	16	26	−10	18
15	Estudiantes Tecos	17	4	5	8	21	34	−13	17
16	Querétaro	17	4	4	9	16	35	−19	16
17	Necaxa	17	3	6	8	10	15	−5	15
18	Chiapas	17	4	2	11	15	30	−15	14

Source: FeMexFut
Rules for classification: 1) points; 2) goal difference; 3) number of goals scored.

==== Group standings ====
Group 1
Pos	Team	Pld	W	D	L	GF	GA	GD	Pts	Qualification
1	UANL	17	10	5	2	26	9	+17	35	Advanced to the Final Phase
2	Monterrey	17	7	5	5	23	20	+3	26	Advanced to the Final Phase
3	Guadalajara	17	6	7	4	23	15	+8	25	Advanced to the Final Phase
4	Santos Laguna	17	7	2	8	23	23	0	23	
5	Estudiantes Tecos	17	4	5	8	21	34	−13	17	
6	Necaxa	17	3	6	8	10	15	−5	15	

Group 2
Pos	Team	Pld	W	D	L	GF	GA	GD	Pts	Qualification
1	Atlante	17	8	3	6	28	17	+11	27	Advanced to the Final Phase
2	América	17	8	2	7	31	28	+3	26	Advanced to the Final Phase
3	Atlas	17	6	5	6	19	19	0	23	
4	San Luis	17	4	9	4	20	18	+2	21	
5	Toluca	17	5	6	6	28	27	+1	21	
6	Pachuca	17	4	6	7	16	25	−9	18	

Group 3
Pos	Team	Pld	W	D	L	GF	GA	GD	Pts	Qualification
1	UNAM	17	10	5	2	27	13	+14	35	Advanced to the Final Phase
2	Morelia	17	9	4	4	31	24	+7	31	Advanced to the Final Phase
3	Cruz Azul	17	7	5	5	25	20	+5	26	Advanced to the Final Phase
4	Puebla	17	5	3	9	16	26	−10	18	
5	Querétaro	17	4	4	9	16	35	−19	16	
6	Chiapas	17	4	2	11	15	30	−15	14	

=== Results ===
Home \ Away	AMÉ	ATE	ATL	CRU	EST	GUA	CHI	MON	MOR	NEC	PAC	PUE	QUE	SLU	SLA	TOL	UNL	UNM
América		1–1		0–2					1–2		0–2	5–4	3–1	3–0		4–3	1–2	
Atlante			3–1	3–0			5–1			1–1		2–0		0–0	1–4	2–1		0–2
Atlas	0–2				1–1	1–1	2–0	1–0	5–0				2–1		1–2			0–0
Cruz Azul			2–1		4–1	1–1	2–0	3–0	2–3	0–0						1–0		3–3
Estudiantes Tecos	1–3	0–1				1–0		3–2			1–0		0–0		1–3		0–0	
Guadalajara	3–0	2–0						2–3			4–1	0–0	2–0	1–1	0–1		0–0	
Chiapas	2–2				0–2	1–0		1–4		1–1			4–1		1–2		0–1	3–1
Monterrey	2–1	1–0							1–1		2–0	1–1	2–0		1–1		0–0	
Morelia	2–1	2–1	0–5		4–1	1–1	2–1			0–0	1–3			3–3		6–1	0–3	0–1
Necaxa	1–0		0–1		2–2	1–2		0–1	0–0						1–0			0–1
Pachuca		0–4	1–2	0–4			3–0			1–1		1–0		0–0		0–0		
Puebla			2–0	2–0	2–0		1–0		0–2	1–0						1–1		0–1
Querétaro		1–4		1–1					0–3	1–0	1–1	2–1		3–2		0–5		
San Luis			1–1	0–0	3–2		0–0	1–1		0–0		3–0				1–2		0–1
Santos Laguna	2–3			3–0					0–1		1–1	4–0	0–2	1–3			0–2	
Toluca			0–0		4–4	1–2	2–0	1–1	1–6	2–3					3–1			1–1
UANL		2–0	3–0	2–0						1–0	4–2	3–0	2–2	1–1		0–1		
Pumas UNAM	0–2				5–1	1–1		3–2			0–0		3–0		2–0		2–0	

Source: FeMexFut (in Spanish)
Legend: Blue = home team win; Yellow = draw; Red = away team win.

=== Final phase (Liguilla) ===
Quarterfinals
1	UANL	1	1	2
8	Guadalajara	3	1	4
2	UNAM	1	2	3
7	Monterrey	3	0	3
3	Morelia	2	3	5
6	América	1	2	3
4	Atlante	1	0	1
5	Cruz Azul	2	0	2

Semifinals
2	UNAM	1	2	3
8	Guadalajara	1	0	1
3	Morelia	0	3	3
5	Cruz Azul	2	0	2

Finals
2	UNAM	1	2	3
3	Morelia	1	1	2

Champions

7th title

Notes

- If the two teams are tied after both legs, the higher seeded team advances.
- Both finalist qualify to the 2011–12 CONCACAF Champions League. The champion qualifies directly to the Group Stage, while the runner-up qualifies to the Preliminary Round.

=== Top goalscorers ===
Pos	Player	Club	Goals
1	(Mexico) Ángel Reyna	América	13
2	(Peru) Wilmer Aguirre	San Luis	10
3	(Mexico) Christian Bermúdez	Atlante	9
3	(Uruguay) Carlos Bueno	Querétaro	9
3	(Chile) Héctor Mancilla	UANL	9
3	(Mexico) Rafael Márquez	Morelia	9
3	(Argentina) Emanuel Villa	Cruz Azul	9
8	(Mexico) Marco Fabián	Guadalajara	8
9	(Mexico) Juan Carlos Cacho	UNAM	7
9	(Argentina) Mauro Cejas	Estudiantes Tecos	7

== Relegation ==
Pos	Team	'08 A Pts	'09 C Pts	'09 A Pts	'10 C Pts	'10 A Pts	'11 C Pts	Total Pts	Total Pld	Avg	Relegation
1	Toluca	27	36	35	30	22	21	171	102	1.6765	
2	Monterrey	19	26	30	36	32	26	169	102	1.6569	
3	Cruz Azul	26	13	33	25	39	26	162	102	1.5882	
4	UNAM	26	28	17	28	25	35	159	102	1.5588	
5	Morelia	24	22	33	25	21	31	156	102	1.5294	
6	América	21	23	30	25	27	26	152	102	1.4902	
7	Santos Laguna	22	22	27	28	30	23	152	102	1.4902	
8	Pachuca	21	36	24	25	25	18	149	102	1.4608	
9	Guadalajara	25	21	19	32	22	25	144	102	1.4118	
10	UANL	26	14	22	19	24	35	140	102	1.3725	
11	San Luis	29	17	21	14	26	21	128	102	1.2549	
12	Atlante	27	17	23	16	16	27	126	102	1.2353	
13	Puebla	15	26	26	19	19	18	123	102	1.2059	
14	Atlas	22	21	18	24	13	23	121	102	1.1863	
15	Estudiantes Tecos	25	25	20	19	15	17	121	102	1.1863	
16	Jaguares	18	21	19	19	25	14	116	102	1.1373	
17	Querétaro	0	0	18	21	19	16	74	68	1.0882	
18	Necaxa	0	0	0	0	16	15	31	34	0.9118	Relegation to the Liga de Ascenso

Source: FeMexFut (in Spanish)
