= 2009 North American SuperLiga =

SuperLiga 2009

Tournament details
- Host country: United States
- Dates: June 20 – August 5
- Teams: 8 (from 1 confederation)
- Venues: 5 (in 5 host cities)

Final positions
- Champions: (Mexico) Tigres UANL
- Runners-up: (United States) Chicago Fire

Tournament statistics
- Matches played: 15
- Goals scored: 37 (2.47 per match)
- Attendance: 106,832 (7,122 per match)
- Top scorer: (Mexico) Armando Pulido (3 goals)

The 2009 SuperLiga was the third edition of the SuperLiga competition. The top four overall Major League Soccer teams from the 2008 season not already qualified for the CONCACAF Champions League earned qualification, as well as four clubs from the Primera División de México. All games of the tournament were broadcast live on Fox Sports World in Canada, Telefutura in the United States, and Televisa and TV Azteca in Mexico and an internet stream on the SuperLiga website. Tigres UANL won their first title after beating Chicago Fire 4–3 on penalties in the final.

== Qualification ==
The teams involved were selected based on qualification rules set by their respective leagues.

On November 21, 2008, Major League Soccer announced that for the 2009 edition, the top four teams in the 2008 MLS regular season standings not competing in the CONCACAF Champions League in 2009–10 would qualify for SuperLiga 2009. That ruling means that the top two teams from the 2008 MLS season, the Columbus Crew and the Houston Dynamo, who had already qualified for the 2009–10 CONCACAF Champions League, were not eligible to participate in the SuperLiga 2009.

On May 14, 2009, the Primera División de México announced that for the 2009 tournament the top four eligible teams from the Clausura 2008 and Apertura 2008 overall season standings not competing in the CONCACAF Champions League would qualify for SuperLiga 2009. That ruling meant that the Apertura-08 Champion Toluca and the runner-up Cruz Azul (2008 3rd and 4th overall respectively), who had already qualified for the 2009–10 CONCACAF Champions League, were not eligible to participate in the tournament. Pumas UNAM (6th overall) were also ineligible, while Guadalajara (2nd overall) declined to participate.

The SuperLiga 2009 participants were:

From (United States) Major League Soccer:

- Chicago Fire (2008 3rd overall)
- New England Revolution (2008 4th overall)
- Chivas USA (2008 5th overall)
- Kansas City Wizards (2008 6th overall)

From (Mexico) Primera División de México:

- San Luis (2008 1st overall)
- Santos Laguna (2008 5th overall)
- Tigres UANL (2008 7th overall)
- Atlas (2008 8th overall)

== Group stage ==
There were two groups of four teams. Each group contained two clubs from each league with the top two teams from each groups advancing to the semifinals.

=== Group A ===
Team	Pld	W	D	L	GF	GA	GD	Pts
(Mexico) Tigres UANL	3	2	0	1	5	5	0	6
(United States) Chicago Fire	3	2	0	1	3	2	+1	6
(Mexico) San Luis	3	1	1	1	4	3	+1	4
(United States) Chivas USA	3	0	1	2	2	4	−2	1

June 20, 2009
20:00 EDT

Chicago Fire (United States)	1–0	(Mexico) San Luis
McBride 57'	Report

Toyota Park, Bridgeview, Illinois
Attendance: 8,421
Referee: Silviu Petrescu (Canada)

June 20, 2009
22:00 EDT

Chivas USA (United States)	1–2	(Mexico) Tigres UANL
Lahoud 55'	Report	Pulido 11'; Dueñas 82'

The Home Depot Center, Carson, California
Attendance: 11,197
Referee: Wálter Quesada (Costa Rica)

June 23, 2009
20:00 EDT

Chicago Fire (United States)	1–0	(United States) Chivas USA
Mapp 35'	Report

Toyota Park, Bridgeview, Illinois
Attendance: 9,126
Referee: Mark Geiger (United States)

June 23, 2009
22:00 EDT

San Luis (Mexico)	3–1	(Mexico) Tigres UANL
Luna 55'; Reyes 56', 76'	Report	García 74'

Toyota Park, Bridgeview, Illinois
Attendance: 9,126
Referee: Ricardo Areliano (Mexico)

June 27, 2009
20:00 EDT

Chicago Fire (United States)	1–2	(Mexico) Tigres UANL
Blanco 85' (pen.)	Report	Pulido 37', 61'

Toyota Park, Bridgeview, Illinois
Attendance: 9,157
Referee: Kevin Thomas (Jamaica)

June 27, 2009
22:00 EDT

Chivas USA (United States)	1–1	(Mexico) San Luis
Harris 89'	Report	Moreno 54' (pen.)

The Home Depot Center, Carson, California
Attendance: 7,411
Referee: Luis de la Rosa (Panama)

=== Group B ===
Team	Pld	W	D	L	GF	GA	GD	Pts
(United States) New England Revolution	3	2	1	0	6	3	+3	7
(Mexico) Santos Laguna	3	1	1	1	5	5	0	4
(Mexico) Atlas	3	0	2	1	0	1	−1	2
(United States) Kansas City Wizards	3	0	2	1	2	4	−2	2

June 21, 2009
16:30 EDT

Kansas City Wizards (United States)	0–0	(Mexico) Atlas
	Report

Hermann Stadium, St. Louis, Missouri
Attendance: 5,278
Referee: Joel Aguilar (El Salvador)

June 21, 2009
18:30 EDT

New England Revolution (United States)	4–2	(Mexico) Santos Laguna
Larentowicz 38'; Mansally 60'; Heaps 63'; Dube 82'	Report	Vuoso 51'; Rodríguez 55'

Gillette Stadium, Foxborough, Massachusetts
Attendance: 9,512
Referee: Courtney Campbell (Jamaica)

June 24, 2009
19:00 EDT

New England Revolution (United States)	1–1	(United States) Kansas City Wizards
Dube 45+1'	Report	Barnes 85' (o.g.)

Gillette Stadium, Foxborough, Massachusetts
Attendance: 5,378
Referee: Jorge Gonzalez (USA)

June 24, 2009
21:00 EDT

Santos Laguna (Mexico)	0–0	(Mexico) Atlas
Torres (red card) 74'	Report

Gillette Stadium, Foxborough, Massachusetts
Attendance: 5,378
Referee: Erim Ramírez Ulloa (Mexico)

June 28, 2009
16:30 EDT

New England Revolution (United States)	1–0	(Mexico) Atlas
Mansally 32'	Report

Gillette Stadium, Foxborough, Massachusetts
Attendance: 7,411
Referee: Ricardo Cerdas (Costa Rica)

June 28, 2009
18:30 EDT

Kansas City Wizards (United States)	1–3	(Mexico) Santos Laguna
López 80'	Report	Herrera 61'; Vuoso 74'; Rodríguez 90+'

CommunityAmerica Ballpark, Kansas City, Kansas
Attendance: 10,385
Referee: José Molina (Honduras)

== Knockout stage ==
=== Bracket ===
Semi-finals
July 15 – Foxborough, MA
(United States) New England Revolution	1
(United States) Chicago Fire	2
July 15 – Foxborough, MA
(Mexico) Tigres UANL	3
(Mexico) Santos Laguna	2

Final
August 5 – Bridgeview, IL
(United States) Chicago Fire	1 (3)
(Mexico) Tigres UANL (p)	1 (4)

=== Semifinals ===
July 15, 2009
19:00 EDT

New England Revolution (United States)	1–2	(United States) Chicago Fire
Jankauskas 44'	Report	McBride 34'; Blanco 63'

Gillette Stadium, Foxborough, Massachusetts
Attendance: 7,215
Referee: Paul Ward (Canada)

July 15, 2009
21:00 EDT

Tigres UANL (Mexico)	3–2	(Mexico) Santos Laguna
Molina 3'; Fonseca 19'; Batista 83'	Report	Quintero 27'; Torres 91+'

Gillette Stadium, Foxborough, Massachusetts
Attendance: 7,215
Referee: Jamie Gardano (Mexico)

=== Final ===
August 5, 2009
20:00 EDT

Chicago Fire (United States)	1–1	(Mexico) Tigres UANL
Nyarko 10'	Report	Itamar 43'
Penalties
Blanco (penalty scored); Banner (penalty missed); Rolfe (penalty scored); Mapp (penalty missed); Woolard (penalty scored)	3–4	(penalty scored) Fernández; (penalty missed) Viniegra; (penalty scored) Ayala; (penalty scored) Pulido; (penalty scored) Itamar

Toyota Park, Bridgeview, Illinois
Attendance: 20,000
Referee: Joel Aguilar (El Salvador)

2009 SuperLiga champions
(Mexico)
Tigres UANL
1st title

== Goalscorers ==
3 goals

- (Mexico) Armando Pulido ( (Mexico) Tigres UANL)

2 goals

- (Mexico) Cuauhtémoc Blanco ( (United States) Chicago Fire)
- (Zimbabwe) Kheli Dube ( (United States) New England Revolution)
- (Brazil) Itamar ( (Mexico) Tigres UANL)
- (The Gambia) Kenny Mansally ( (United States) New England Revolution)
- (United States) Brian McBride ( (United States) Chicago Fire)
- (Mexico) José Rodolfo Reyes ( (Mexico) San Luis)
- (Mexico) Juan Pablo Rodríguez ( (Mexico) Santos Laguna)
- (Mexico) Matías Vuoso ( (Mexico) Santos Laguna)

1 goal

- (Mexico) Jesús Dueñas ( (Mexico) Tigres UANL)
- (Mexico) Juan Pablo García ( (Mexico) Tigres UANL)
- (Saint Kitts and Nevis) Atiba Harris ( (United States) Chivas USA)
- (United States) Jay Heaps ( (United States) New England Revolution))
- (Mexico) Agustín Herrera ( (Mexico) Santos Laguna)
- (Mexico) Francisco Fonseca ( (Mexico) Tigres UANL)
- (Lithuania) Edgaras Jankauskas ( (United States) New England Revolution)
- (United States) Michael Lahoud ( (United States) Chivas USA)
- (United States) Jeff Larentowicz ( (United States) New England Revolution)
- (Argentina) Claudio López ( (United States) Kansas City Wizards)
- (Mexico) Braulio Luna ( (Mexico) San Luis)
- (United States) Justin Mapp ( (United States) Chicago Fire)
- (Mexico) Jesús Molina ( (Mexico) Tigres UANL)
- (Argentina) Alfredo Moreno ( (Mexico) San Luis)
- (Ghana) Patrick Nyarko ( (United States) Chicago Fire)
- (Colombia) Carlos Quintero ( (Mexico) Santos Laguna)
- (Mexico) Francisco Javier Torres ( (Mexico) Santos Laguna)
