= Francisco Avilán =

Mexican footballer (1947–2021)

Personal information
- Full name: Francisco Avilán Cruz
- Date of birth: 27 August 1947
- Place of birth: Monterrey, Mexico
- Date of death: 5 February 2021 (aged 73)
- Place of death: Monterrey, Mexico
- Position: Forward

Youth career
- 1958–1964: Monterrey

Senior career*
Years	Team	Apps	(Gls)
1964–1970	Monterrey		
1970–1971	Atlas		
1971–1972	Monterrey		
1972–1974	Guadalajara		

International career
1971–1972	Mexico	2	(0)

Managerial career
- 1984–1987: Monterrey
- 1988: Mexico U20
- 1992–1994: Tigres
- 1997–1998: Vida
- Saltillo Soccer
- Irapuato
- 2008: Jaguares de Chiapas (interim)
- * Club domestic league appearances and goals

Francisco Avilán Cruz (27 August 1947 – 5 February 2021) was a Mexican footballer and football manager.

== Early life ==
Born in Monterrey, Mexico, Avilán's father was an amateur footballer and his brother, Arnulfo, played for Monterrey. His other brother, Pedro, played in the Mexican second division.

He followed in the footsteps of his brother Arnulfo when he joined Monterrey in 1958.

== Club career ==
Avilán was handed his first team debut by Uruguayan manager Roberto Scarone in 1964 against Club Deportivo Nacional, helping Monterrey to a 2–0 win. He remained with Monterrey until 1970, when he had a short stint with Atlas, before returning to Monterrey. He signed with Guadalajara before retiring in 1974.

== International career ==
He was called up to the Mexico national football team on several occasions, making two appearances between 1971 and 1972. In doing so, he became the first Monterrey player to represent Mexico.

== Managerial career ==
Avilán returned to Monterrey at the end of the 1970s, initially managing the youth sector, which included future Mexican internationals Francisco Javier Cruz, Héctor Becerra and Missael Espinoza.

After studying football management in Yugoslavia, Avilán was named manager of Monterrey in 1984. With signings such as Guillermo Muñoz, he led Monterrey to the México 86 title, the first in the club's history.

While serving as manager of the Mexico national under-20 football team, it was found Mexico had knowingly fielded four overage players at the 1988 CONCACAF U-20 Tournament. The scandal, known as Cachirules, saw several Mexican officials banned from football for life; however, Avilán himself received no sanction, and said that if he had known these players were overaged, he would not have selected them.

Avilán returned to management in 2008, when he was named manager of Jaguares de Chiapas on an interim basis.

== Death ==
Avilán died in February 2021, following a bout of COVID-19.

== Career statistics ==
=== International ===
National team	Year	Apps	Goals
Mexico	1971	1	0
Mexico	1972	1	0
Total		2	0

== Managerial statistics ==
Managerial record by team and tenure
Team	From	To	Record				
Team	From	To	P	W	D	L	Win %
Jaguares de Chiapas	2008	2008	8	3	1	4	37.5
Total			8	3	1	4	37.5
