= Cachirules =

1988 association football scandal

The Cachirules scandal was a 1988 association football scandal in which the Mexican Football Federation (FEMEXFUT) was found to have knowingly used at least four overage players (Gerardo Jiménez, José de la Fuente, José Luis Mata, and Aurelio Rivera) on the Mexico under-20 team which played at the 1988 CONCACAF U-20 Tournament, a qualification tournament for the 1989 FIFA World Youth Championship. FIFA, the world governing body, imposed a severe sanction on FEMEXFUT, banning all Mexican teams from international competition for two years from 25 April 1988 to 1 July 1990. As a result, the Mexico national football team were ineligible for the 1990 FIFA World Cup. The scandal has been considered a turning point in the history of football in Mexico and North America in general.

== CONCACAF U-20 Tournament ==
Mexico and other national youth teams of the CONCACAF region were required to finish in first or second place in the 1988 CONCACAF U-20 Tournament hosted in Guatemala during April 1988 in order to qualify for the 1989 FIFA World Youth Championship in Saudi Arabia.

Earlier in the same year, FIFA issued a statement warning all national associations not to attempt to deceive the footballing authorities regarding the age of players participating in youth tournaments (in response to what was common practice by youth teams across the world of including players of ages over the regulatory limit). The maximum age established by FIFA for the participation of footballers in the Youth World Championship was 20 years.

Mexico played their first two matches against Guyana, winning by scores of 9–0 and 2–0, and then against the host team, again winning both matches, 2–1 and 3–0. This last victory occurred on 20 April 1988, with forward Gerardo Jiménez scoring a goal, securing first place in their group and qualification to the World Youth Championship.

== Investigation ==
Journalist Antonio Moreno from the Mexican public TV network Imevisión (now TV Azteca) and author of a football-dedicated column for Mexican newspaper Ovaciones, discovered in an April 1988 yearbook (1986–87 edition) published by FEMEXFUT itself, a discrepancy between the players' ages shown in the publication and the ones submitted by the federation to CONCACAF for the qualification tournament in Guatemala. On 20 April 1988 Moreno published an article emphasizing the risks of "trying to create an advantage over the opponents by including players over the permitted age". In response, the then FEMEXFUT president Rafael del Castillo played down the matter and verbally attacked the reporter.

Antonio Moreno, however, was backed up by fellow Imevisión journalist José Ramón Fernández, from the show La Misma Hora, who broadcast the news on television. The initial reaction of the FEMEXFUT was to deny and ignore the accusations, but once the public realized the magnitude of the scandal, many Mexican journalists began to interview the players and to insistently look for the team members' birth certificates; eventually, the real birth dates of players Gerardo Jiménez and José de la Fuente, both two years older than the established limit by the FEMEXFUT, were found. Forward José Luis Mata was also over the age limit, by three years, and defender Aurelio Rivera was four years over. Rivera, team captain at the time, has declared in later interviews that every member of the squad was over age, although such affirmation has not been verified.

The information was widely spread on televised and written media in Mexico and inevitably reached the United States Soccer Federation, who submitted an official complaint to CONCACAF, demanding the case be investigated, after its youth team failed to qualify for the U-20 World Cup in Saudi Arabia. The Guatemalan Football Federation joined the protest. The discovery was conducted by Salvadorean José Ramón Flores, who promptly verified the falsity of the ages submitted by the FEMEXFUT for the tournament's squad members.

== Aftermath ==
On 19 June 1988, CONCACAF determined that the ages of the four players (Jiménez, de la Fuente, Mata, and Rivera) were in fact false, and Mexico was disqualified from participation in the Saudi Arabia Youth World Championship.

Further, several officials were banned for life (but not the team coach Francisco Avilán), among them José de Jesús Alvarez Guzmán, Rafael Castellanos, Rafael del Castillo, Víctor Manuel González, Ramón Martínez, Manuel Acevez Montenegro, Gerardo Gallegos, Gilberto Morfín Salazar, and Héctor Antonio Pérez. With the disqualification of Mexico, the United States replaced Mexico in qualifying for the World Youth Championship and, along with Costa Rica, were the two CONCACAF representatives.

Rafael del Castillo traveled to Zurich on 22 June 1988 and attempted to appeal before FIFA, hoping to overturn his life ban issued by CONCACAF; no regard was given to the situation of Mexico's football suspension. The Mexico executives arrived at the FIFA headquarters confident of the influence that Guillermo Cañedo might have within world football's governing body, but they did not achieve the expected results.

On 30 June 1988, FIFA not only upheld CONCACAF's decision to eject the Mexican U-20 team from the World Youth Championship, but also barred all Mexican national teams, including the senior team, from all FIFA-sanctioned international competition for two years, retrospective to 25 April. This penalty not only disqualified Mexico from the 1988 Olympic tournament in Seoul, but also meant they were banned from entering the qualifying for the 1990 World Cup in Italy. Guatemala replaced Mexico at the 1988 Summer Olympics, and along with the United States were the two CONCACAF representatives.

Previous violators of age limits had only received bans from underage competitions. FIFA believed these past sanctions had had little effect, and said the harsher punishment was intended "to serve as a strong warning".

The following week, FIFA selected the United States as hosts for the 1994 World Cup; a conspiracy theory holds that Mexico's disqualification from the 1990 tournament was intended to make it easier for the U.S. team to qualify, and so drum up interest in the sport there.

After the disqualification, Mexico has never been able to surpass the round of 16 since their return to the tournament in 1994, thus making the 1986 the last time the national football team ever reached the quarter-finals. Some believe that the 4th match is cursed by the Cachirules scandal.

== See also ==
- Age fraud in association football
