= Miguel Ángel Herrera =

Mexican footballer (born 1989)

Personal information
- Full name: Miguel Ángel Herrera Equihua
- Date of birth: 3 April 1989 (age 37)
- Place of birth: Uruapan, Michoacán, Mexico
- Height: 1.83 m (6 ft 0 in)
- Position: Centre-back

Youth career
- 2007: Monarcas Zacapu
- 2008: San Mateo Atenco
- 2008–2013: Pachuca
- 2010: Tampico Madero
- 2011: Titanes Tulancingo

Senior career*
Years	Team	Apps	(Gls)
2012–2023	Pachuca	134	(2)
2016	→ Monterrey (loan)	4	(0)
2016	→ Tigres UANL (loan)	0	(0)
2017	→ Veracruz (loan)	5	(0)
2017–2020	→ León (loan)	48	(0)
2023	Toros Neza	0	(0)

International career
2014–2015	Mexico	4	(0)
Medal record
Men's football
Representing Mexico
CONCACAF Gold Cup
Winner	2015 United States–Canada	Team
- * Club domestic league appearances and goals

Miguel Ángel Herrera Equihua (Note: In this Spanish name, the first or paternal surname is Herrera and the second or maternal family name is Equihua.) (born 3 April 1989) is a Mexican former professional footballer who played as a centre-back.

== Club career ==
=== Pachuca ===
Herrera began his football career at Pachuca in 2008. He progressed through the ranks having successful seasons with the youth teams until he was called up to the first team in 2012. He made his first appearance with the first team during a Cup match against Leones Negros on 25 July 2012 that resulted in a 0–1 loss.

He made his league debut with Pachuca during the Apertura 2012 season on 4 August 2012 under coach Hugo Sánchez against Querétaro coming in as a substitute for Miguel Gerardo Velázquez in the 78th minute of the game, the match ended in a 1–0 win, with Herrera participating 12th minutes of the game. Throughout his debut season the Apertura 2012 season he played two more games (which he started). During his second season with Pachuca he became a regular starter as first choice center back after week 5 of the Clausura 2013 season. He made it to the League final against León, losing 4–3 in extra time, during that season. He demonstrated great ability to defend, and great flair which led to a call-up to the Mexico national team.

Herrera scored his first goal for Pachuca during a Cup match against La Piedad on 21 August 2012 which resulted in a 1–1 tie for Pachuca, and scored his first league goal against Tigres UANL on 27 July 2013 winning the match 2–1.

=== Monterrey ===
On 28 November 2015, Rayados de Monterrey announced that Herrera had been transferred to Monterrey on a season-long deal, in exchange for Stefan Medina. At the end of the season Herrera returned to Pachuca where he was later loaned to UANL.

== International career ==
Miguel Ángel received his first call-up by coach Miguel Herrera to the national team in October 2013 for a friendly against Finland and for the Intercontinental play-offs against New Zealand but failed to make an appearance.

Herrera received his second call-up to the national team for two friendlies against Chile on 6 September and Bolivia on 9 September 2014.

Herrera made his debut with the national team 6 September 2014, starting the match and playing the entire 90 minutes against Chile which ended in a score-less tie. In this match Herrera recovered six balls and only failed to complete 1 out of 21 passes reaching a 95% success rate (20 completed passes).

== Career statistics ==
=== Club ===
As of 7 September 2014

Club performance			League		Cup		Continental		Total	
Season	Club	League	Apps	Goals	Apps	Goals	Apps	Goals	Apps	Goals
Mexico			Liga MX		Copa MX		North America		Total	
Apertura 2012	Pachuca	Liga MX	3	0	5	1	—		8	1
Clausura 2013	Pachuca	Liga MX	14	0	4	1	—		18	1
Apertura 2013	Pachuca	Liga MX	15	1	2	0	—		17	1
Clausura 2014	Pachuca	Liga MX	23	0	2	0	—		25	0
Apertura 2014	Pachuca	Liga MX	7	0	—		2	0	9	0
Total	Pachuca		62	1	13	2	2	0	77	3
Total	Career total		62	1	13	2	2	0	77	3

=== International ===
As of 14 October 2015

Mexico
Year	Apps	Goals
2014	3	0
2015	1	0
Total	4	0

== Honours ==
Tigres UANL

- Liga MX: Apertura 2016

Mexico

- CONCACAF Gold Cup: 2015
