= Armando Pulido =

Mexican footballer (born 1989)

Personal information
- Full name: Armando Pulido Izaguirre
- Date of birth: 25 March 1989 (age 37)
- Place of birth: Ciudad Victoria, Tamaulipas, Mexico
- Height: 1.66 m (5 ft 5 in)
- Position: Midfielder

Youth career
- 2007–2009: UANL

Senior career*
Years	Team	Apps	(Gls)
2009–2010	UANL	11	(0)
2010–2012	→ Tijuana (loan)	13	(2)
2012	→ Querétaro (loan)	11	(0)
2012–2014	UAT	12	(2)
2014–2016	Kissamikos	0	(0)
2016–2019	UAT	33	(2)
- * Club domestic league appearances and goals

Armando Pulido Izaguirre (born March 25, 1989) is a former professional Mexican footballer who last played for Correcaminos UAT.

== Personal life ==
His younger brother, Alan, is a professional footballer who currently plays for Liga MX club Guadalajara.

== Honours ==
UANL

- North American SuperLiga: 2009

Individual

- North American SuperLiga top scorer: 2009
