= Eisner Loboa =

Colombian-born Mexican footballer (born 1987)

Eisner Iván Loboa
Personal information
- Full name: Eisner Iván Loboa Balanta
- Date of birth: 17 May 1987 (age 39)
- Place of birth: Caloto, Colombia
- Height: 1.75 m (5 ft 9 in)
- Positions: Midfielder; right back

Team information
- Current team: Municipal Limeño

Senior career*
Years	Team	Apps	(Gls)
2006–2009	Deportivo Cali	17	(0)
2010	Deportivo Pasto	34	(9)
2011	→ Shanghai Shenhua (loan)	14	(1)
2012–2016	León	84	(6)
2014–2015	→ Puebla (loan)	15	(0)
2015	→ Atlas (loan)	14	(1)
2016	→ Morelia (loan)	14	(0)
2016	América Mineiro	3	(0)
2017–2018	América de Cali	9	(0)
2020	Olmedo	3	(1)
2020–2021	Achuapa	3	(0)

International career
2007	Colombia U-20		
- * Club domestic league appearances and goals as of 19:00, 22 November 2020 (UTC)

Eisner Iván Loboa Balanta (Spanish pronunciation: [ˈejsneɾ loˈβoa]; born 17 May 1987) is a Colombian-born Mexican footballer who plays as a midfielder. He also holds Mexican citizenship.

== Career ==
Loboa began his career in 2006 for top tier Categoría Primera A side Deportivo Cali as a defensive midfielder. He was considered a good enough talent to be included in the Colombian U-20 squad that played in the 2007 South American Youth Championship that finished sixth within the tournament and failed to qualify for the 2007 FIFA U-20 World Cup. When he returned he was unable to establish himself as first team regular and in 2010 he would join second tier Categoría Primera B side Deportivo Pasto.

On 9 July 2011, he joined Chinese top-tier side Shanghai Shenhua on loan for six months to see him play out the rest of the Chinese league season. He would immediately be included in the club's first team and within five days make his debut as a substitute in a 1−1 draw with Liaoning Whowin. After the game Loboa would struggle to establish himself within the team and would often be used as a substitute, he would however score his debut goal against Jiangsu Sainty in a 3–2 defeat before leaving.

After his loan period ended he would permanently join top tier Mexican side Club León halfway through the 2011–12 Mexican league season.

== Career statistics ==
As of match played 22 November 2020

Appearances and goals by club, season and competition
Club	Season	League			National cup		Continental		Total	
Club	Season	Division	Apps	Goals	Apps	Goals	Apps	Goals	Apps	Goals
Deportivo Cali	2009	Categoría Primera A	13	0	0	0	0	0	13	0
Deportivo Pasto	2010	Categoría Primera B	34	9	0	0	—		34	9
Shanghai Shenhua (loan)	2011	Chinese Super League	14	1	2	0	—		16	1
León	2011–12	Ascenso MX	16	3	—		—		16	3
León	2012–13	Liga MX	32	3	0	0	2	0	34	3
León	2013–14	Liga MX	36	0	2	0	6	0	44	0
León	Total		84	6	2	0	8	0	94	6
Puebla (loan)	2014–15	Liga MX	15	0	7	1	—		22	1
Atlas (loan)	2015–16	Liga MX	15	1	2	0	—		17	1
Morelia (loan)	2015–16	Liga MX	14	0	0	0	—		14	0
América Mineiro	2016	Série A	3	0	—		—		3	0
América de Cali	2017	Categoría Primera A	9	0	2	0	—		11	0
Olmedo	2020	Liga Pro Ecuador Serie A	3	1	—		—		3	1
Achuapa	2020–21	Liga Nacional de Guatemala	3	0	—		—		3	0
Career total			207	18	15	1	8	0	230	19

== Honours ==
León

- Liga de Ascenso:Clausura 2012
- Liga MX (2): Apertura 2013, Clausura 2014

Puebla F.C

- Copa Mx (1):
