= Edwin Hernández =

Mexican footballer (born 1986)

Personal information
- Full name: Edwin William Hernández Herrera
- Date of birth: 10 July 1986 (age 40)
- Place of birth: Pachuca, Hidalgo, Mexico
- Height: 1.66 m (5 ft 5 in)
- Position: Left-back

Youth career
- Pachuca

Senior career*
Years	Team	Apps	(Gls)
2005–2011	Indios	97	(0)
2010	→ San Luís (loan)	10	(0)
2011–2015	León	126	(7)
2015–2016	→ Guadalajara (loan)	26	(0)
2016–2018	Guadalajara	82	(2)
2019	→ Pachuca (loan)	4	(0)
2020	Salamanca UDS	1	(0)
2020	Chapulineros de Oaxaca	0	(0)

International career^{‡}
2013	Mexico	2	(0)
- * Club domestic league appearances and goals as of 30 August 2020 ‡ National team caps and goals as of 7 May 2020

Edwin William Hernández Herrera (born 10 July 1986) is a former Mexican professional footballer who last played as left-back for Liga de Balompié Mexicano club Chapulineros de Oaxaca.

He signed with the Chapulineros de Oaxaca of the Liga de Balompié Mexicano ahead of the league's inaugural season, leading them to a title with a victory over Atlético Veracruz in the finals.

== Honours ==
=== Club ===
León

- Liga de Ascenso: Clausura 2012
- Liga MX: Apertura 2013, Clausura 2014

Guadalajara

- Liga MX: Clausura 2017
- Copa MX: Apertura 2015, Clausura 2017
- Supercopa MX: 2016
- CONCACAF Champions League: 2018

Chapulineros de Oaxaca

- Liga de Balompié Mexicano: 2020–21, 2021

=== Individual ===
- CONCACAF Champions League Best XI: 2018
