= Pablo Velázquez =

Paraguayan footballer (born 1987)

Personal information
- Full name: Pablo César Leonardo Velázquez Centurión
- Date of birth: 12 March 1987 (age 39)
- Place of birth: Asunción, Paraguay
- Height: 1.92 m (6 ft 4 in)
- Position: Forward

Youth career
- Atlántida

Senior career*
Years	Team	Apps	(Gls)
2005–2013	Libertad	127	(39)
2009	→ Rubio Ñu (loan)	38	(26)
2011	→ San Lorenzo (loan)	17	(2)
2013–2015	Toluca	59	(29)
2015	→ Atlético Nacional (loan)	13	(3)
2015–2016	Morelia	33	(10)
2016–2017	Cerro Porteño	24	(5)
2017	Necaxa	12	(3)
2018	Guarani	27	(6)
2019	Nacional	12	(0)
2019–2020	Gimnasia LP	9	(1)
2020	Banfield	3	(0)
2020	General Díaz	0	(0)
2021	12 de Octubre	0	(0)
2022	River Plate (PAR)	0	(0)

International career^{‡}
2007	Paraguay U-20		
2009–	Paraguay	4	(0)
- * Club domestic league appearances and goals as of 01:54, 9 November 2019 (UTC) ‡ National team caps and goals as of 31 December 2010

Pablo César Leonardo Velázquez Centurión (born 12 March 1987) is a Paraguayan footballer who plays as a striker. He last played for River Plate (Asunción).

== Career ==
Velázquez began his career in the youth divisions of Atlántida Sport Club. After scoring 45 goals in an under-15 tournament with the team, he joined Libertad in 2003. He scored his first professional goal with the team in his debut on 10 December 2005, against 12 de Octubre.

In 2009, Velázquez was loaned to Rubio Ñu. There, he got the chance to play regularly and seized the opportunity by becoming the top scorer in the Paraguayan Primera División Apertura championship, with 16 goals in 20 games. After this, the Argentine club River Plate tried to sign him in July. However, the transfer did not materialize because the club wanted him on loan at a price well below that set by the owner of Velázquez's transfer rights, Libertad (US$3 million). A few weeks later, the player rejected an offer from CSKA Sofia of Bulgaria. In August, River attempted to sign him again. A deal was close, and the press even confirmed the transfer, but eventually the clubs could not agree on the form of payment. Almost immediately came an offer from another Argentine team, San Lorenzo; this time, River reported that the transfer deadline was due and San Lorenzo had not registered Velázquez.

Velázquez continued his career with Rubio Ñu. In the Torneo Clausura, he scored 10 goals in 19 games, totalling 26 in 39 during the 2009 season. This made him the season's top scorer in the Paraguayan Primera División. After the season, his loan ended and he returned to Libertad.

On 30 December 2010, Velázquez was announced as the new signing of San Lorenzo, of the Argentine Primera División.

After good performances at Libertad, Velázquez was linked to a move to the Mexican side Deportivo Toluca, where the Paraguayan international Edgar Benítez played. Toluca's coach, the former Paraguayan international and Toluca striker José Saturnino Cardozo, requested Velázquez along with Olimpia's Paraguayan international Richard Ortiz. Other teams that have looked to sign Velázquez are the Brazilian teams Palmeiras and Atletico Paranaense and teams in France and Italy.

== International career ==
Velázquez played the South American Youth Championship with Paraguay U-20 in 2007.

== Honours ==
Individual

- Paraguayan Primera División top scorer: 2009
- Liga MX Golden Boot (Shared): Apertura 2013
