= Ignacio González (footballer, born 1984) =

Mexican footballer

Personal information
- Full name: Juan Ignacio González Ibarra
- Date of birth: 8 July 1984 (age 42)
- Place of birth: Guadalajara, Jalisco, Mexico
- Height: 1.90 m (6 ft 3 in)
- Position: Defender

Senior career*
Years	Team	Apps	(Gls)
2005–2006	Coyotes de Sonora	32	(1)
2006	Académicos	10	(0)
2007	Celaya	18	(0)
2007–2008	UAG Tecos	8	(0)
2008–2009	Querétaro	35	(1)
2010–2020	León	268	(12)
Total		371	(14)
- * Club domestic league appearances and goals

Juan Ignacio González Ibarra (born 8 July 1984) is a Mexican former professional footballer who played as a defender.

== Honours ==
León

- Ascenso MX: Clausura 2012
- Liga MX: Apertura 2013, Clausura 2014, Guardianes 2020
