= 1988 CONCACAF U-20 Tournament =

Tournament details
- Host country: Guatemala
- Dates: 9–24 April
- Teams: 10
- Venue(s): Estadio Carlos Salazar Hijo; Estadio del Ejército

Final positions
- Champions: Costa Rica (1st title)
- Runners-up: Mexico
- Third place: United States
- Fourth place: Cuba

The 1988 CONCACAF Under-20 Championship was held in Guatemala, although it has also been reported that the tournament was held in Trinidad and Tobago. It also served as qualification for the 1989 FIFA World Youth Championship. This edition of the tournament would see Mexico's youth squad become disqualified due to the Cachirules scandal banning all Mexico national team squads from total participation in FIFA organized events.

== Qualification ==
Team 1	Agg.	Team 2	1st leg	2nd leg
Honduras	2–5	Costa Rica	1–2	1–3

Other qualification matches may have been played.

== Teams ==
The following teams entered the tournament:

Region	Team(s)
Caribbean (CFU)	Bermuda; Cuba; Jamaica; Netherlands Antilles; Trinidad and Tobago
Central America (UNCAF)	Costa Rica; Guatemala (host)
North America (NAFU)	Canada; Mexico; United States

== Round 1 ==
=== Group 1 ===
Estadio Carlos Salazar Hijo, Mazatenango

Teams	Pld	W	D	L	GF	GA	GD	Pts
Costa Rica	4	3	1	0	9	2	+7	7
United States	4	3	0	1	7	3	+4	6
Trinidad and Tobago	4	2	1	1	10	6	+4	5
Guatemala	4	1	0	3	3	9	–6	2
Jamaica	4	0	0	4	1	10	–9	0

9 April	Costa Rica	3–0	Jamaica
	United States	4–1	Trinidad and Tobago
11 April	Costa Rica	1–1	Trinidad and Tobago
	Jamaica	0–1	Guatemala
13 April	Costa Rica	1–0	United States
	Trinidad and Tobago	4–1	Guatemala
15 April	Jamaica	1–2	United States
	Guatemala	1–4	Costa Rica
17 April	Jamaica	0–4	Trinidad and Tobago
	Guatemala	0–1	United States

=== Group 2 ===
Estadio del Ejército, Guatemala City

Teams	Pld	W	D	L	GF	GA	GD	Pts
Mexico	4	4	0	0	15	1	+14	8
Cuba	4	3	0	1	4	3	+1	6
Canada	4	1	1	2	4	4	0	3
Bermuda	4	1	1	2	5	8	–3	3
Netherlands Antilles	4	0	0	4	1	13	–12	0

10 April	Netherlands Antilles	1–2	Bermuda
	Canada	0–1	Cuba
12 April	Canada	3–0	Netherlands Antilles
	Bermuda	1–4	Mexico
14 April	Canada	1–1	Bermuda
	Cuba	0–2	Mexico
16 April	Netherlands Antilles	0–7	Mexico
	Cuba	2–1	Bermuda
18 April	Cuba	1–0	Netherlands Antilles
	Canada	0–2	Mexico

== Final round ==
Estadio Carlos Salazar Hijo, Mazatenango

Teams	Pld	W	D	L	GF	GA	GD	Pts
Costa Rica	3	3	0	0	10	2	+8	6
Mexico (D)	3	2	0	1	4	5	–1	4
United States	3	1	0	2	4	6	–2	2
Cuba	3	0	0	3	3	8	–5	0

20 April	Costa Rica	3–1	United States
	Mexico	2–1	Cuba
22 April	United States	2–1	Cuba
	Costa Rica	3–0	Mexico
24 April	Costa Rica	4–1	Cuba
	Mexico	2–1	United States

1988 CONCACAF U-20 Championship

Costa Rica
First title

== Qualification to World Youth Championship ==
The two best performing teams qualified for the 1989 FIFA World Youth Championship.

- Costa Rica
- United States (replacing Mexico, who were disqualified)
