= Christian Martínez (footballer, born 1979) =

Mexican footballer

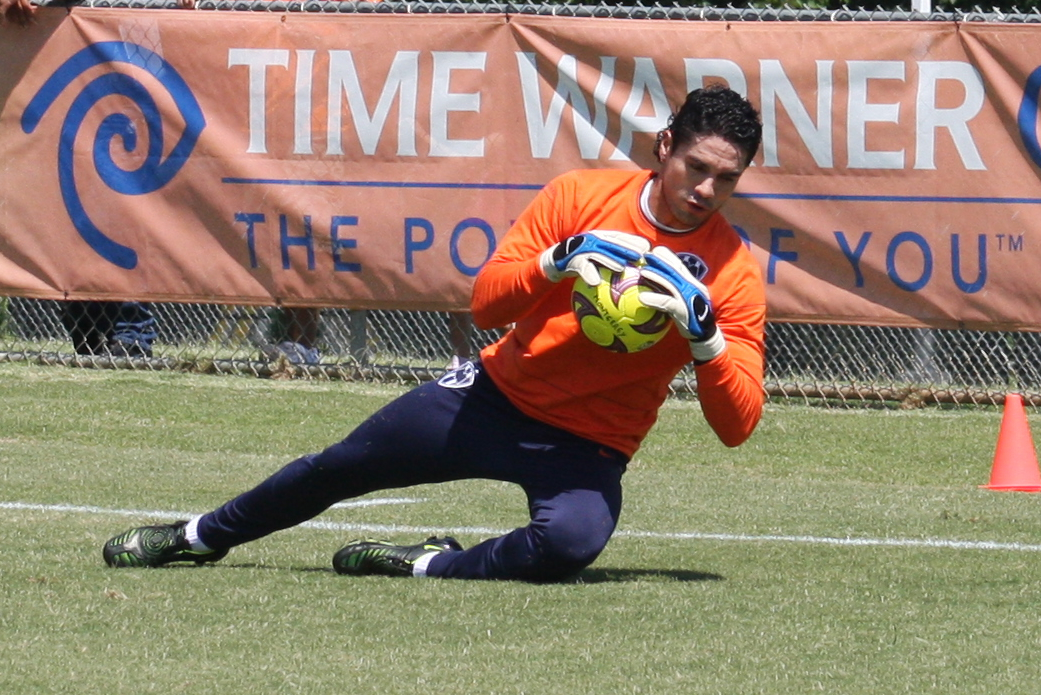
- Martínez training with Monterrey

Personal information
- Full name: Christian Martínez Cedillo
- Date of birth: 16 October 1979 (age 47)
- Place of birth: Mexico City, Mexico
- Height: 1.80 m (5 ft 11 in)
- Position: Goalkeeper

Senior career*
Years	Team	Apps	(Gls)
1999–2000	América	8	(0)
2000–2002	Puebla	26	(0)
2003–2004	San Luis	19	(0)
2005–2011	Monterrey	130	(0)
2010	→ Indios (loan)	14	(0)
2010–2012	Estudiantes Tecos	52	(1)
2012–2017	León	52	(0)
Total		301	(1)

International career
1999	Mexico U20	5	(0)
2000	Mexico	2	(0)

Managerial career
- 2018–2021: León Reserves and Academy
- 2021–2022: León (Goalkeeping coach)
- 2022: León (Interim)
- 2022–2024: León Reserves and Academy
- * Club domestic league appearances and goals

Christian Martínez Cedillo (born 16 October 1979) is a Mexican former professional footballer who played as a goalkeeper. He made a name for himself at the 1999 FIFA World Youth Championship in Nigeria, when he was the starting goalkeeper for Mexico. He made his México Primera División debut for América in a derby against Guadalajara.

== Honours ==
León

- Liga MX: Apertura 2013, Clausura 2014
