= Mauricio Castañeda =

Mexican footballer (born 1992)

Personal information
- Full name: Mauricio Castaneda Mendoza
- Date of birth: 24 March 1992 (age 34)
- Place of birth: León, Guanajuato, Mexico
- Height: 1.74 m (5 ft 9 in)
- Position: Forward

Senior career*
Years	Team	Apps	(Gls)
2010-2014	León	7	(3)
2014-2016	Mineros de Zacatecas	1	(0)
2016-2017	Leones Negros UdeG		
2017-2018	Real Madriz	18	(12)
2018	Murciélagos	3	(0)
- * Club domestic league appearances and goals

Mauricio Castaneda Mendoza (born 24 March 1992) is a professional Mexican footballer who currently plays for Murciélagos.
