= Jesús Molina =

Mexican footballer (born 1988)

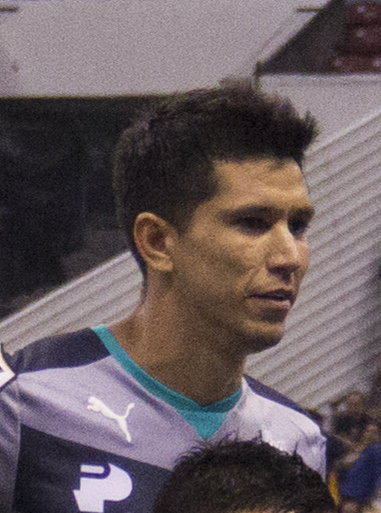
- Molina with Santos Laguna in 2016

Personal information
- Full name: Jesús Antonio Molina Granados
- Date of birth: 29 March 1988 (age 38)
- Place of birth: Hermosillo, Sonora, Mexico
- Height: 1.86 m (6 ft 1 in)
- Position: Defensive midfielder

Senior career*
Years	Team	Apps	(Gls)
2007–2011	Tigres UANL	97	(10)
2011–2014	América	126	(6)
2015–2016	Santos Laguna	72	(4)
2017–2018	Monterrey	62	(4)
2019–2022	Guadalajara	95	(8)
2023–2024	UNAM	27	(0)

International career
2010–2018	Mexico	32	(0)
- * Club domestic league appearances and goals as of 10 December 2023

Jesús Antonio Molina Granados (born 29 March 1988) is a Mexican former professional footballer who played as a defensive midfielder.

== Club career ==
=== UANL ===
Jesús Molina debuted with Tigres UANL on 24 August 2007 in a 1–2 defeat against Veracruz. During the Apertura 2007 tournament he made eight appearances under then-manager Américo Gallego. The following Clausura 2008 tournament, Molina only made one appearance against Pachuca in a 1–6 defeat on 14 February.

Molina scored his first goal for UANL on 10 May 2009 in a 1–1 draw against Monarcas Morelia. During the Clausura 2010 tournament, Molina scored six goals in thirteen appearances.

For the Clausura 2011, his final tournament with UANL, Molina made sixteen appearances and scored one goal.

=== América ===
On 8 June 2011 Molina was officially transferred to Club América for the Apertura 2011 tournament. He made his official debut on 24 July 2011 in a 2–1 victory against Querétaro. He then went on to become a champion with América in the Clausura 2013 tournament and in the Apertura 2014 tournament.

Molina scored his first goal for América on 25 February 2012 in a 4–0 victory against Atlante.

=== Santos Laguna ===
On 1 January 2015 Molina was officially transferred to Santos Laguna for the Clausura 2015 tournament. He made his official debut on 18 January 2015 in a 0–1 loss against Cruz Azul. He then went to become a champion with Santos Laguna in the Clausura 2015 tournament.

Molina scored his first goal for Santos Laguna on 24 January 2015 in a 4–1 victory against Monterrey.

=== Monterrey ===
In December 2016, Molina joined C.F. Monterrey.

=== Guadalajara ===
In December 2018, Molina joined C.D. Guadalajara. On 6 January 2019, he made his debut with Guadalajara, as a starter, in a 2–0 victory over Club Tijuana. On 27 October, he scored his first goal with Guadalajara in a 2–1 victory over Juárez.

Shortly after the arrival of Tomás Boy as new manager of the club, in June 2019, Molina was named captain of the team for the upcoming season.

== International career ==
Molina made his debut for Mexico on 17 March 2010 in a friendly match against North Korea, which Mexico won 2–1.

In May 2018, Molina was named in the preliminary 28-man squad for the World Cup, but did not make the final 23.

== Career statistics ==
=== International ===
As of match played 29 May 2018

National team	Year	Apps	Goals
Mexico	2010	1	0
Mexico	2011	2	0
Mexico	2012	2	0
Mexico	2013	3	0
Mexico	2016	10	0
Mexico	2017	10	0
Mexico	2018	4	0
Total		32	0

== Honours ==
Tigres UANL

- SuperLiga: 2009

América

- Liga MX: Clausura 2013, Apertura 2014

Santos Laguna

- Liga MX: Clausura 2015
- Campeon de Campeones: 2015

Monterrey

- Copa MX: Apertura 2017

Individual

- Liga MX Best XI: Clausura 2015
