= Gustavo Matosas =

Argentine-born Uruguayan footballer and manager

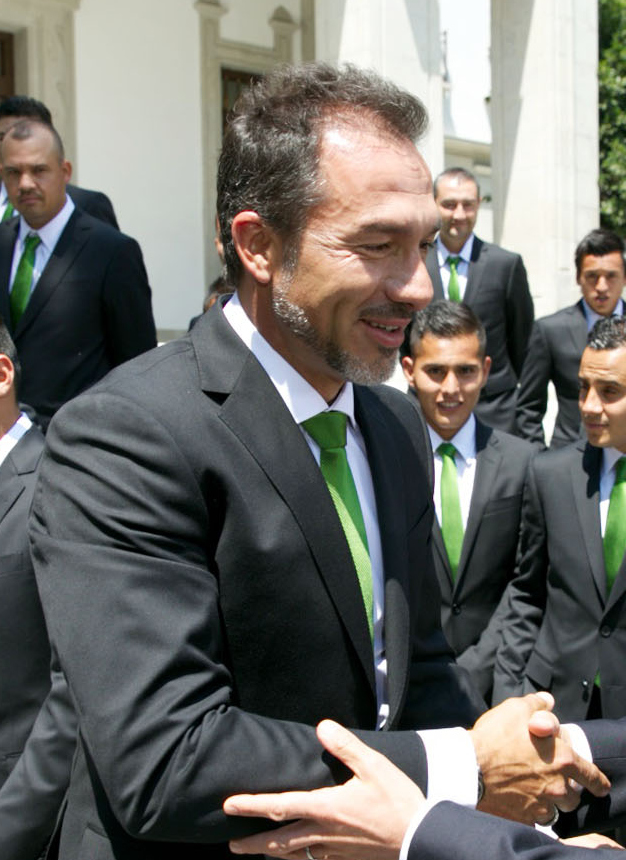
- Matosas in 2014

Personal information
- Full name: Gustavo Cristian Matosas Paidón
- Date of birth: 27 May 1967 (age 59)
- Place of birth: Buenos Aires, Argentina
- Height: 1.80 m (5 ft 11 in)
- Position: Midfielder

Senior career*
Years	Team	Apps	(Gls)
1985–1988	Peñarol	105	(8)
1989–1990	Málaga	45	(4)
1991–1992	San Lorenzo	45	(3)
1992	Racing Club	12	(1)
1993–1994	São Paulo	5	(2)
1993–1994	Lleida	17	(2)
1994–1995	Valladolid	15	(1)
1996	Atlético Paranaense		
1997	Goiás	14	(0)
1999–2000	Tianjin Teda	49	(2)
2001	El Tanque Sisley		
2001	Querétaro	6	(0)

International career
1987–1992	Uruguay	7	(1)

Managerial career
- 2002–2003: Villa Española
- 2004: Plaza Colonia
- 2005: Rampla Juniors
- 2006–2007: Danubio
- 2007–2008: Peñarol
- 2008–2009: Bella Vista
- 2009–2010: U. de San Martín
- 2010–2011: Danubio
- 2011: Queretaro
- 2012–2014: León
- 2014–2015: América
- 2015: Atlas
- 2016: Al-Hilal
- 2017: Cerro Porteño
- 2017: Estudiantes LP
- 2018–2019: Costa Rica
- 2019: Atlético San Luis
- 2025: Danubio (interim)
- 2026: Danubio (interim)
- 2026: Danubio
Medal record
Representing Uruguay
Copa América
Winner	1987 Argentina
- * Club domestic league appearances and goals

Gustavo Cristian Matosas Paidón (born 25 May 1967) is a Uruguayan football manager and former footballer.

As a player, Matosas was a central midfielder known for his technical ability and leadership, notably winning the 1987 Copa Libertadores with Peñarol and the 1987 Copa América with the Uruguay national football team. His club career spanned over 15 years across Uruguay, Argentina, Spain, Brazil, China, and Mexico.

After retiring, Matosas transitioned into management and gained widespread recognition for guiding Club León to back-to-back Liga MX titles during the 2013–14 season. He also managed prominent clubs including Club América, with whom he won the 2014–15 CONCACAF Champions League, as well as Atlas F.C., Estudiantes de La Plata, Al Hilal SFC, and the Costa Rica national football team. His coaching career has been marked by both domestic and international tenures, alongside periods of both success and controversy.

== Playing career ==
=== Club ===
Born in Buenos Aires, Argentina on 25 May 1967, Gustavo Matosas is the son of former Uruguayan international footballer Roberto Matosas. At the time of his birth, his father played for River Plate.

Despite being born in Argentina, Matosas was eligible to represent Uruguay through his father and chose to play internationally for that country.

He began his professional career in 1985 with Peñarol in the Uruguayan Primera División. While at Peñarol, he won two league titles and was part of the squad that captured the 1987 Copa Libertadores, defeating América de Cali in the final.

Following his success in Uruguay, Matosas had an extensive international club career. He played for Málaga in Spain, San Lorenzo in Argentina, and São Paulo in Brazil. He later joined Tianjin Teda in China, and also had spells with various other clubs across Argentina, Brazil, and Spain during the 1990s.

He concluded his playing career in Mexico, where he appeared for Querétaro in the Primera División de México before retiring in 2001.

=== International ===
Matosas made his debut with the Uruguay national football team in 1987. That same year, he was part of the squad that won the 1987 Copa América, defeating Chile 1–0 in the final in Buenos Aires. Over the course of his international career, he earned seven caps for Uruguay.

== Managerial career ==
In 2012, Matosas became manager of Club León, where he led the team to promotion to Liga MX from Ascenso MX. Under his guidance, León won back-to-back league titles in the Apertura 2013 and Clausura 2014 tournaments, a rare achievement in Mexican football.

In December 2014, Matosas was announced as the new manager of Club América. During his tenure, the club won the 2014–15 CONCACAF Champions League, securing a place in the 2015 FIFA Club World Cup. He left América in May 2015, citing disagreements with the club’s board over player transfers.

Later in 2015, Matosas took over as manager of Atlas FC, but his time with the club was short-lived, and he departed after one season.

On 12 June 2016, he signed a one-year contract with Al Hilal FC of Saudi Arabia. During his tenure, Al Hilal reached the final of the Saudi Crown Prince Cup, where they were defeated by Al-Ittihad.

Matosas returned to South America in June 2017 to manage Estudiantes de La Plata in Argentina. He resigned on 19 September 2017, citing personal reasons.

On 10 October 2018, he was appointed head coach of the Costa Rica national football team. His tenure saw underwhelming results, including draws against Haiti and Curaçao in the 2019–20 CONCACAF Nations League. He resigned on 5 September 2019, later stating the role was "boring" due to limited day-to-day activity compared to club management.

On 9 September 2019, Matosas was appointed manager of newly promoted Atlético San Luis in Liga MX. He made a winning debut on 13 September 2019, leading the team to a 3–1 victory over Puebla.

However, his stint was cut short by mid-season. On 26 October 2019, leaked audio surfaced from a 2012 conversation between Matosas and agent Fernando Pavón, allegedly detailing a commission arrangement regarding striker Matías Britos’ transfer at Club León. The revelation sparked ethical questions under FIFA rules and intensified scrutiny.

Following a string of five losses in seven matches and heightening off-field pressure, Atlético San Luis and Matosas mutually terminated his contract on 27 October 2019. No formal sanctions were recorded, but the incident drew significant attention from media and Liga MX officials.

== Honours ==
=== As a player ===
Peñarol

- Primera División: 1985, 1986
- Copa Libertadores: 1987

Uruguay

- Copa América: 1987

=== As a manager ===
Danubio

- Uruguayan Primera División: 2006–07

León

- Liga MX: Apertura 2013, Clausura 2014
- Liga de Ascenso: Clausura 2012

America

- CONCACAF Champions League: 2014–15
