= José Luis Mata =

Mexican footballer and manager (born 1966)

Personal information
- Full name: José Luis Mata Santacruz
- Date of birth: 12 February 1966 (age 60)
- Place of birth: Guadalajara, Jalisco, Mexico
- Height: 1.75 m (5 ft 9 in)
- Position: Forward

Senior career*
Years	Team	Apps	(Gls)
1987–1993	Atlas		

Managerial career
- 2006–2007: Académicos (assistant)
- 2007: Querétaro (assistant)
- 2008: Querétaro
- 2008: Zapotlanejo
- 2009: Atlas Reserves and Academy
- 2010: Atlas (assistant)
- 2010: Atlas (Interim)
- 2011–2012: Querétaro Reserves and Academy
- 2012: Querétaro (assistant)
- 2013: Atlas (assistant)
- 2013: Atlas (Interim)
- 2015: Necaxa (assistant)
- 2016: BUAP (assistant)
- 2018: Zacatepec (assistant)
- 2020: Morelia Reserves and Academy
- 2020–2021: Catedráticos Elite (assistant)
- * Club domestic league appearances and goals

José Luis Mata Santacruz (born 19 March 1966) is a Mexican football manager and former player.
