= Itamar (footballer, born 1980) =

Brazilian footballer (born 1980)

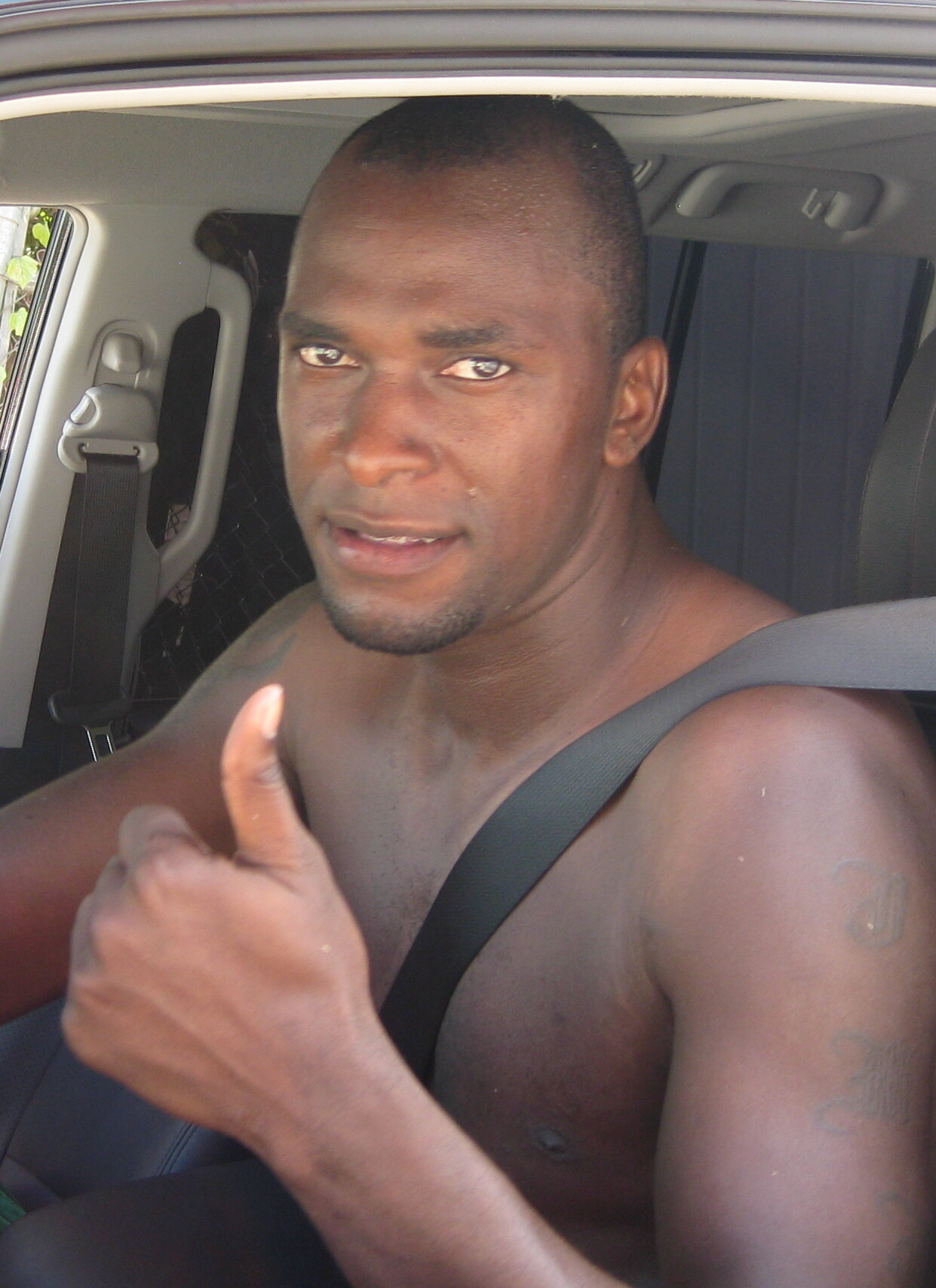

Personal information
- Full name: Itamar Batista Da Silva
- Date of birth: April 12, 1980 (age 46)
- Place of birth: Santa Maria, Minas Gerais, Brazil
- Height: 1.85 m (6 ft 1 in)
- Position: Forward

Senior career*
| Years | Team | Apps | (Gls) |
| 1997 | Cruzeiro | | |
| 1998 | Valerio | | |
| 1999 | Atlético Paranaense | 1 | (0) |
| 2000 | Iraty | | |
| 2001 | Goiás | 15 | (4) |
| 2002 | Palmeiras | 17 | (4) |
| 2003 | São Paulo | | |
| 2003–2004 | Chunnam Dragons | 56 | (29) |
| 2005 | Pohang Steelers | 8 | (2) |
| 2005–2006 | Suwon Samsung Bluewings | 21 | (8) |
| 2007 | Seongnam Ilhwa Chunma | 34 | (8) |
| 2008–2009 | Chiapas | 46 | (21) |
| 2009–2011 | Tigres UANL | 43 | (18) |
| 2011 | → Al-Rayyan (loan) | 14 | (6) |
| 2012 | Flamengo | 0 | (0) |
| 2012 | Ceará | 26 | (7) |
| 2013 | América-RN | | |
- * Club domestic league appearances and goals as of March 11, 2013

Itamar Batista da Silva (born April 12, 1980), known as just Itamar, is a Brazilian former professional footballer who played as a forward. During his career, he made over 300 appearances across Brazil, South Korea, Mexico, Qatar and scored more than 100 goals. He is known for his prolific scoring spell with Chunnam Dragons in South Korea's K-League. He began his career at Cruzeiro and later moved to multiple clubs in Brazil before joining clubs in Asia and Mexico. His previous clubs include Chiapas, Seongnam Ilhwa Chunma, Suwon Samsung Bluewings, Pohang Steelers, Chunnam Dragons, Tigres UANL, Flamengo and Ceará Sporting Club. Itamar spent a total of five years in South Korea, playing for four clubs before it was announced in January 2008 that Chiapas of Mexico acquired the player. In his first season, he scored 12 goals in 18 games. In January 2011 Itamar moved to Al Rayyan Sports Club in Qatar on loan from Tigres UANL. He then signed with Brazilian club América-RN.

== Club career ==
=== Club career statistics ===
| Club performance | | | League | | Cup | | League Cup | | Continental | | Total | |
| Season | Club | League | Apps | Goals | Apps | Goals | Apps | Goals | Apps | Goals | Apps | Goals |
| Korea Republic | | | League | | FA Cup | | K-League Cup | | Asia | | Total | |
|---|---|---|---|---|---|---|---|---|---|---|---|---|
| 2003 | Chunnam Dragons | K-League | 34 | 23 | 5 | 2 | - | | - | | 39 | 25 |
| 2004 | Chunnam Dragons | K-League | 22 | 6 | 2 | 0 | 9 | 5 | - | | 33 | 11 |
| 2005 | Pohang Steelers | K-League | 8 | 2 | 0 | 0 | 8 | 2 | - | | 16 | 4 |
| 2005 | Suwon Samsung Bluewings | K-League | 10 | 4 | 3 | 3 | 0 | 0 | - | | 13 | 7 |
| 2006 | Suwon Samsung Bluewings | K-League | 11 | 4 | 1 | 1 | 6 | 0 | - | | 18 | 5 |
| 2006 | Seongnam Ilhwa Chunma | K-League | 14 | 3 | 0 | 0 | 0 | 0 | - | | 14 | 3 |
| 2007 | Seongnam Ilhwa Chunma | K-League | 20 | 5 | 1 | 0 | 0 | 0 | 8 | 0 | 29 | 5 |
| Country | Korea Republic | | 119 | 47 | 12 | 6 | 23 | 7 | 8 | 0 | 162 | 60 |
| Total | | | 119 | 47 | 12 | 6 | 23 | 7 | 8 | 0 | 162 | 60 |
