= 2013–14 Liga MX season =

67th professional season of the top-flight football league in Mexico

Liga MX
- Season: 2013–14
- Champions: Apertura: León (6th title); Clausura: León (7th title)
- Relegated: Atlante
- Champions League: América; León; Cruz Azul; Pachuca
- Copa Libertadores: Santos Laguna; León; Morelia
- Matches: 153
- Goals: 387 (2.53 per match)
- Top goalscorer: Apertura: Pablo Velázquez (12 goals); Clausura: Enner Valencia (12 goals)
- Biggest home win: Apertura: Toluca 7–1 Atlante (September 29, 2013); Clausura:<
- Biggest away win: Apertura: Chiapas 0–4 Toluca (August 17, 2013); Clausura:
- Highest scoring: Apertura: Toluca 7–1 Atlante (September 29, 2013); Clausura:
- Longest winning run: Cruz Azul: 8 Games (January 11-March 8)
- Longest unbeaten run: Cruz Azul: 10 Games (January 4-March 8)
- Longest winless run: Atlas: 14 Games (July 19–October 20)
- Longest losing run: Atlas: 14 Games (July 19–October 20)

The 2013–14 Liga MX season (known as the Liga BBVA Bancomer MX for sponsorship reasons) was the 67th professional top-flight football league season in Mexico. The season was split into two competitions: the Torneo Apertura and the Torneo Clausura; each of identical format and contested by the same eighteen teams.

== Clubs ==
Eighteen teams competed in the season. Querétaro was relegated to the Ascenso MX after accumulating the lowest coefficient over the past three seasons. The 2012 Apertura Ascenso MX champion La Piedad would promote after defeating the Clausura 2013 winner Neza in a promotional play-off. But on May 28, 2013, Querétaro's ownership announced that it bought out Jaguares de Chiapas, relocated the team to Querétaro, dissolved the old Querétaro team and ensured that Querétaro would still have a team in the first division. It was also announced that San Luis would move to Tuxtla Gutiérrez and be rebranded Chiapas F.C., replacing the old Querétaro. La Piedad confirmed that they would relocate to Veracruz and be rebranded as Tiburones Rojos de Veracruz. These changes sparked controversy in the Mexican press as Querétaro effectively bought its place back in the first division and newly promoted La Piedad completely lost its team.

Location of the 2013–14 Liga MX teams

=== Stadiums and locations ===
Club	City	State	Stadium	Capacity
América	Mexico City	Distrito Federal	Azteca	105,000
Atlante	Cancún	Quintana Roo	Andrés Quintana Roo	20,000
Atlas	Guadalajara	Jalisco	Jalisco	63,200
Chiapas	Tuxtla Gutiérrez	Chiapas	Víctor Manuel Reyna	31,500
Cruz Azul	Mexico City	Distrito Federal	Estadio Azul	35,000
Guadalajara	Guadalajara	Jalisco	Omnilife	49,850
León	León	Guanajuato	León	33,943
Monterrey	Monterrey	Nuevo León	Tecnológico	38,000
Morelia	Morelia	Michoacán	Morelos	39,000
Pachuca	Pachuca	Hidalgo	Hidalgo	30,000
Puebla	Puebla	Puebla	Cuauhtémoc	48,650
Querétaro	Querétaro	Querétaro	La Corregidora	36,500
Santos Laguna	Torreón	Coahuila	Corona	30,000
Tijuana	Tijuana	Baja California	Caliente	21,000
Toluca	Toluca	Estado de México	Nemesio Díez	27,000
UANL	San Nicolás de los Garza	Nuevo León	Universitario	42,000
UNAM	Mexico City	Distrito Federal	Olímpico Universitario	63,000
Veracruz	Veracruz	Veracruz	Estadio Luis de la Fuente	30,000

=== Personnel and kits ===
Team	Manager	Captain	Kit manufacturer	Shirt sponsor
América	(Argentina) Antonio Mohamed	(Colombia) Aquivaldo Mosquera	Nike	Bimbo, Coca-Cola
Atlante	(Argentina) Pablo Marini	(Mexico) Mauricio Romero	Kappa	Cancún, Riviera Maya, ADO, Grupo Pegaso
Atlas	(Mexico) Tomás Boy	(Argentina) Leandro Cufré	Nike	Casas Javer, Coca-Cola
Chiapas	(Mexico) Sergio Bueno	(Argentina) Javier Muñoz	Pirma/Kappa	Chiapas, Soriana
Cruz Azul	(Mexico) Luis Fernando Tena	(Mexico) Gerardo Torrado	Umbro	Cemento Cruz Azul, Coca-Cola
Guadalajara	(Argentina) Ricardo La Volpe	(Mexico) Omar Bravo	adidas	Bimbo
León	(Uruguay) Gustavo Matosas	(Mexico) Rafael Márquez	Pirma	Caja Popular Mexicana, Telcel, Coca-Cola, Office Depot
Monterrey	(Mexico) Carlos Barra & (Mexico) José Treviño (interim)	(Argentina) José María Basanta	Nike	Bimbo/Carta Blanca (in FIFA Club World Cup), BBVA Bancomer
Morelia	(Argentina) Ángel David Comizzo	(Colombia) Aldo Ramírez	Joma	Bridgestone, Dportenis
Pachuca	(Mexico) Enrique Meza	(Mexico) Óscar Pérez	Nike	Cementos Fortaleza, Mobil Super, Samsung, Telcel
Puebla	(Argentina) Rubén Omar Romano	(Mexico) Luis Miguel Noriega	Pirma/Kappa	Volkswagen/www.puebla.travel
Querétaro	(Mexico) Ignacio Ambríz	(Mexico) Marco Jiménez	Pirma	Libertad Servicios Financieros, Gasolineras Orsan
Santos Laguna	(Portugal) Pedro Caixinha	(Mexico) Oswaldo Sánchez	Puma	Soriana, Peñoles, Pepsi, Lala
Tijuana	(Venezuela) César Farías	(Argentina) Javier Gandolfi	Nike	Caliente, Boing!
Toluca	(Paraguay) José Cardozo	(Paraguay) Paulo Da Silva	Under Armour	Banamex
UANL	(Brazil) Ricardo Ferretti	(Mexico) Lucas Lobos	adidas	Cemex, Cemento Monterrey
UNAM	(Mexico) José Luis Trejo	(Paraguay) Darío Verón	Puma	Banamex
Veracruz	(Mexico) José Luis Sánchez Solá	(Mexico) Jehu Chiapas	Kappa	Winpot, Boing!

=== Managerial changes ===
Team	Outgoing manager	Manner of departure	Date of vacancy	Replaced by	Date of appointment	Position in table
Pre-Apertura changes
Tijuana	(Argentina) Antonio Mohamed	Contract Expired	May 3, 2013	(Argentina) Jorge Almirón	May 31, 2013	Pre-season
Atlante	(Mexico) Daniel Guzmán	Resigned	May 5, 2013	(Uruguay) Wilson Graniolatti	June 4, 2013	Pre-season
Toluca	(Mexico) Enrique Meza	Sacked	May 5, 2013	(Paraguay) José Cardozo	May 7, 2013	Pre-season
Atlas	(Mexico) Tomás Boy	Resigned	May 13, 2013	(Argentina) Omar Asad	June 2, 2013	Pre-season
Chiapas	(Mexico) José Guadalupe Cruz	Job Lost; Due to Relocation (to Querétaro)	May 20, 2013	(Mexico) Sergio Bueno	June 5, 2013	Pre-season
Apertura changes
Puebla	(Mexico) Manuel Lapuente	Sacked	August 13, 2013	(Argentina) Rubén Omar Romano	August 14, 2013	13th
Guadalajara	(Mexico) Benjamín Galindo	Sacked	August 18, 2013	(Mexico) Juan Carlos Ortega	August 19, 2013	15th
Monterrey	(Mexico) Víctor Manuel Vucetich	Sacked	August 25, 2013	(Mexico) José Guadalupe Cruz	August 26, 2013	14th
Pachuca	(Mexico) Gabriel Caballero	Resigned	September 2, 2013	(Mexico) Enrique Meza	September 4, 2013	11th
Atlante	(Uruguay) Wilson Graniolatti	Mutual consent	September 2, 2013	(Uruguay) Rubén Israel	September 3, 2013	18th
UNAM	(Mexico) Juan Antonio Torres	Sacked	September 2, 2013	(Mexico) José Luis Trejo	September 3, 2013	17th
Atlas	(Argentina) Omar Asad	Sacked	October 5, 2013	(Mexico) José Luis Mata	October 8, 2013	16th
America	(Mexico) Miguel Herrera	Interim for Mexico National Team (came back for the post-season)	October 21, 2013	(Mexico) Álvaro Galindo (Interim)	October 22, 2013	1st
America	(Mexico) Álvaro Galindo (Interim)	End of tenure as caretaker	November 21, 2013	(Mexico) Miguel Herrera	November 22, 2013	1st
Pre-Clausura changes
Guadalajara	(Mexico) Juan Carlos Ortega	Sacked	November 10, 2013	(Mexico) José Luis Real	November 25, 2013	Pre-season
Atlas	(Mexico) José Luis Mata	Sacked	November 10, 2013	(Mexico) Tomás Boy	December 6, 2013	Pre-season
Tijuana	(Argentina) Jorge Almirón	Sacked	November 11, 2013	(Venezuela) César Farías	December 3, 2013	Pre-season
Cruz Azul	(Mexico) Guillermo Vázquez	Contract Expired	December 3, 2013	(Mexico) Luis Fernando Tena	December 11, 2013	Pre-season
America	(Mexico) Miguel Herrera	Leaving to Mexico National Team	December 15, 2013	(Argentina) Antonio Mohamed	December 17, 2013	Pre-season
Clausura changes
Atlante	(Uruguay) Rubén Israel	Sacked	January 11, 2014	(Argentina) Pablo Marini	January 11, 2014	14th
Morelia	(Argentina) Carlos Bustos	Sacked	January 26, 2014	(Mexico) Eduardo de la Torre	January 27, 2014	11th
Veracruz	(Mexico) Juan Antonio Luna	Sacked	February 9, 2014	(Mexico) José Luis Sánchez Solá	February 11, 2014	17th
Monterrey	(Mexico) José Guadalupe Cruz	Sacked	February 18, 2014	(Mexico) Carlos Barra & (Mexico) José Treviño (interim)	February 19, 2014	15th
Morelia	(Mexico) Eduardo de la Torre	Sacked	March 1, 2014	(Mexico) Roberto Hernández (interim)	March 9, 2014	15th
Morelia	(Mexico) Roberto Hernández	End of tenure as caretaker	March 9, 2014	(Argentina) Ángel Comizzo	March 9, 2014	11th
Guadalajara	(Mexico) José Luis Real	Sacked	April 1, 2014	(Argentina) Ricardo La Volpe	April 2, 2014	10th

== Torneo Apertura ==
The Apertura 2013 is the first competition of the season. The regular season began on July 19, 2013 and ended on November 10, 2013. América successfully defended their title for the 11th time.

=== Regular season ===
==== Standings ====
Pos	Team	Pld	W	D	L	GF	GA	GD	Pts	Qualification
1	América	17	11	4	2	31	12	+19	37	Advance to the Final phase and cannot qualify for South American competitions (Note: América, Cruz Azul, Tijuana and Toluca cannot qualify for the 2014 Copa Libertadores due to their participation in the 2013-14 CONCACAF Champions League competition.) (Note: The first 8 places in the table qualify for the Final phase.)
2	Santos Laguna	17	9	6	2	32	20	+12	33	2014 Copa Libertadores Second Stage (Note: All 3 teams who qualify for Copa Libertadores participated in the Final phase of this competition.)
3	León (C)	17	8	6	3	25	14	+11	30	2014 Copa Libertadores Second Stage
4	Cruz Azul	17	8	5	4	21	17	+4	29	Advance to the Final phase and cannot qualify for South American competitions
5	Toluca	17	6	9	2	33	17	+16	27	Advance to the Final phase and cannot qualify for South American competitions
6	Morelia	17	8	3	6	26	23	+3	27	2014 Copa Libertadores First Stage
7	Querétaro	17	7	5	5	20	19	+1	26	Advance to the Final phase
8	UANL	17	6	7	4	23	20	+3	25	Advance to the Final phase
9	Chiapas	17	6	7	4	26	25	+1	25	
10	Tijuana	17	5	6	6	20	23	−3	21	Cannot qualify for South American competitions
11	Monterrey	17	5	5	7	22	23	−1	20	
12	Veracruz	17	4	8	5	20	24	−4	20	
13	Puebla	17	4	7	6	19	21	−2	19	
14	Pachuca	17	3	8	6	14	18	−4	17	
15	Atlas	17	1	9	7	18	29	−11	12	
16	Guadalajara	17	2	6	9	16	30	−14	12	
17	Atlante	17	3	3	11	17	35	−18	12	
18	UNAM	17	1	8	8	8	21	−13	11	

Source: MedioTiempo
Rules for classification: 1) points; 2) goal difference; 3) number of goals scored.
(C) Champions

=== Results ===
Home \ Away	AMÉ	ATE	ATL	CHI	CAZ	GUA	LEÓ	MON	MOR	PAC	PUE	QUE	SLA	TIJ	TOL	UNL	UNM	VER
América			3–0	3–1		2–0		1–0	3–1		3–1			2–0	1–1			
Atlante	2–4		1–1	2–0				2–1	2–2	1–1			1–3				1–0	2–4
Atlas					1–2		1–2			1–1		3–1	2–2			0–1	1–1	3–3
Chiapas			3–0			1–1				2–1	4–2		2–1	3–1	0–4		1–1	
Cruz Azul	1–1	1–0		1–1		3–1	1–0	1–0	1–0			0–2				0–1		
Guadalajara		1–0	1–1							1–3	2–4		0–2	2–2	0–0		1–0	0–2
León	1–1	1–0		0–1		2–1		3–1	0–0		3–1			5–0	2–2			
Monterrey			0–0	1–1		2–1				1–0	1–1			2–1	1–1		0–1	
Morelia			2–0	2–1		1–1		1–3		4–1	1–0			2–1	3–4			
Pachuca	0–1				0–0		1–1					0–1	1–1			2–1	0–0	1–1
Puebla		1–0	2–0		1–2					1–1			1–1	2–0	1–1		1–1	0–0
Querétaro	0–0	1–0		1–1		2–0	2–0	3–3	1–3		1–0					2–2		
Santos Laguna	2–1				3–2		0–2	3–2	3–1			2–0				3–0		2–2
Tijuana		4–1	3–3		0–0					1–0		1–0	1–1			0–0	2–0	3–0
Toluca		7–1	1–1		1–2					0–1		4–0	2–2	0–0			0–0	3–1
UANL	1–0	3–1		2–2		3–3	1–1	3–1	1–2		0–0				1–2			
UNAM	1–4				2–2		1–1		0–1			0–3	0–1			0–2		0–0
Veracruz	0–1			2–2	3–2		0–1	0–3	1–0			0–0				1–1		

Updated to match(es) played on 10 November 2013. Source: soccerway
Legend: Blue = home team win; Yellow = draw; Red = away team win.

=== Top goalscorers ===
Players ranked by goals scored, then alphabetically by last name.

Rank	Player	Club	Goals
1	(Paraguay) Pablo Velázquez	Toluca	12
2	(Argentina) Mauro Boselli	León	11
3	(Chile) Humberto Suazo	Monterrey	10
4	(Mexico) Oribe Peralta	Santos Laguna	9
5	(Mexico) Ángel Reyna	Veracruz	8
5	(Chile) Hector Mancilla	Morelia	8
7	(Mexico) Alan Pulido	UANL	7
7	(Mexico) Carlos Ochoa	Chiapas	7
7	(Ecuador) Fidel Martínez	Tijuana	7
7	(Argentina) Matías Alustiza	Puebla	7
7	(Mexico) Raúl Jiménez	América	7
7	(Mexico) Rafael Márquez Lugo	Guadalajara	7

Source: Televisa Deportes

=== Hat-tricks ===
Player	For	Against	Result	Date
(Argentina) Darío Benedetto	Tijuana	Atlas	3–3	July 19, 2013
(Ecuador) Jefferson Montero	Morelia	Toluca	3–4	July 26, 2013
(Mexico) Ángel Reyna	Veracruz	Atlante	2–4	July 27, 2013
(Paraguay) Pablo Velázquez	Toluca	Chiapas	0–4	August 17, 2013
(Argentina) Mauro Boselli*	León	Tijuana	5–0	November 9, 2013

* Scored four goals

=== Final phase ===
==== Bracket ====
Quarterfinals
1	América (a)	2	1	3
8	UANL	2	1	3
4	Cruz Azul	0	1	1
5	Toluca	3	1	4
2	Santos Laguna	3	3	6
7	Querétaro	2	1	3
3	León	3	4	7
6	Morelia	3	0	3

Semifinals
1	América	1	2	3
5	Toluca	2	0	2
2	Santos Laguna	1	2	3
3	León	3	2	5

Finals
1	América	0	1	1
3	León	2	3	5

Notes

- Teams were re-seeded each round.
- Team with more goals on aggregate after two matches advances.
- Away goals rule was applied in the quarterfinals and semifinals, but not in the final.
- In the quarterfinals and semifinals, if the two teams were tied on aggregate and away goals, the higher seeded team advances.
- In the final, if the two teams were tied after both legs, the match went to extra-time and, if necessary, a shootout.
- Both finalists qualified to the 2014–15 CONCACAF Champions League (in Pot 3).

==== Quarter-finals ====
Team 1	Agg.	Team 2	1st leg	2nd leg
UANL	3–3 (a)	América	2–2	1–1
Querétaro	3–6	Santos Laguna	2–3	1–3
Morelia	3–7	León	3–3	0–4
Toluca	4–1	Cruz Azul	3–0	1–1

==== Semi-finals ====
Team 1	Agg.	Team 2	1st leg	2nd leg
Toluca	2–3	América	2–1	0–2
León	5–3	Santos Laguna	3–1	2–2

==== Finals ====
Team 1	Agg.	Team 2	1st leg	2nd leg
León	5–1	América	2–0	3–1

Notes

- If the two teams are tied after both legs, the higher seeded team advances.
- "Away goals" rule was applied in the play-off round, but not in the final.
- Both finalists qualified to the 2014–15 CONCACAF Champions League (champion in Pot A, runner-up in Pot B).

== Torneo Clausura ==
The Clausura 2014 is the second competition of the season. The regular season began on January 3, 2014 and ended on May 18, 2014. León successfully defended their sixth title.

=== Regular phase ===
==== League table ====
Pos	Team	Pld	W	D	L	GF	GA	GD	Pts	Qualification or relegation
1	Cruz Azul	17	11	3	3	28	19	+9	36	Advance to the Final phase
2	Toluca	17	10	2	5	25	14	+11	32	Advance to the Final phase
3	UNAM	17	7	4	6	26	20	+6	25	Advance to the Final phase
4	Santos Laguna	17	6	7	4	33	29	+4	25	Advance to the Final phase
5	América	17	7	4	6	21	17	+4	25	Advance to the Final phase
6	Pachuca	17	7	3	7	23	21	+2	24	Advance to the Final phase
7	Tijuana	17	7	3	7	22	23	−1	24	Advance to the Final phase
8	León (C)	17	6	5	6	23	17	+6	23	Advance to the Final phase
9	Chiapas	17	6	5	6	23	23	0	23	
10	Monterrey	17	6	5	6	20	20	0	23	
11	Morelia	17	5	6	6	21	20	+1	21	
12	Atlas	17	5	6	6	17	18	−1	21	
13	Querétaro	17	6	3	8	18	22	−4	21	
14	UANL	17	5	6	6	13	17	−4	21	
15	Guadalajara	17	5	6	6	13	18	−5	21	
16	Puebla	17	4	6	7	14	19	−5	18	
17	Atlante (R)	17	5	3	9	22	34	−12	18	Relegated to Ascenso MX
18	Veracruz	17	3	7	7	14	25	−11	16	

(C) Champions; (R) Relegated

=== Results ===
Home \ Away	AMÉ	ATE	ATL	CHI	CAZ	GUA	LEÓ	MON	MOR	PAC	PUE	QUE	SLA	TIJ	TOL	UNL	UNM	VER
América		1–0			1–2		1–0			0–1		0–0	2–4			3–0	1–3	0–0
Atlante					1–4	1–1	1–1				0–0	4–2		1–2	2–1	0–2		
Atlas	1–2	0–1		2–2		1–1		0–1	1–1		0–0			0–0	1–0			
Chiapas	2–2	5–2			0–1		0–3	1–1	1–0			1–0				0–0		1–1
Cruz Azul			1–3							2–2	1–0		2–1	2–1	1–0		2–1	4–0
Guadalajara	0–4			1–0	0–2		1–0	0–1	1–1			2–1				0–0		
León			3–1		0–0					1–3		1–1	4–2			3–0	1–2	0–1
Monterrey	1–2	3–2			0–0		0–2		0–1			3–1	2–2			0–0		4–1
Morelia	1–0	1–2			5–1		0–0					0–1	2–2			2–0	3–1	1–1
Pachuca		0–1	0–1	2–0		1–3		2–0	3–0		1–2			2–1	0–1			
Puebla	0–1			2–3		0–1	1–1	1–1	3–1			1–0				0–1		
Querétaro			1–0		1–3					3–4			0–0	2–1	0–2		1–0	2–0
Santos Laguna		4–3	2–3	2–3		1–1				3–1	0–0			3–2	2–0		2–1	
Tijuana	1–0			0–3		2–0	1–2	2–1	1–0		3–1				3–1			
Toluca	1–1			2–0		1–0	2–1	2–0	2–2		3–0					2–1		
UANL			2–1		3–0					0–0		0–2	1–1	1–1			1–2	1–0
UNAM		5–0	1–1	2–1		1–0		1–2		0–0	2–2			3–0	0–2			
Veracruz		2–1	0–1			1–1				3–1	0–1		2–2	1–1	0–3		1–1	

Updated to match(es) played on 27 April 2014. Source: soccerway
Legend: Blue = home team win; Yellow = draw; Red = away team win.

=== Top goalscorers ===
Players ranked by goals scored, then alphabetically by last name.

Rank	Player	Club	Goals
1	(Ecuador) Enner Valencia	Pachuca	12
2	(Argentina) Martín Bravo	UNAM	9
3	(Ecuador) Michael Arroyo	Atlante	8
3	(Mexico) Oribe Peralta	Santos Laguna	8
3	(Mexico) Raúl Jiménez	América	8
6	(Paraguay) Pablo Velázquez	Toluca	7
6	(Mexico) Marco Fabián	Cruz Azul	7
6	(Argentina) Cristian Pellerano	Tijuana	7
6	(Colombia) Carlos Quintero	Santos Laguna	7

Source: MedioTiempo.com

=== Hat-tricks ===
Player	For	Against	Result	Date
(Ecuador) Michael Arroyo*	Atlante	Querétaro	4–2	March 9, 2014
(Colombia) Carlos Quintero	Santos Laguna	Atlante	4–3	April 13, 2014

* Scored four goals

=== Final phase ===
==== Bracket ====
Quarterfinals
1	Cruz Azul	1	2	3
8	León (a)	1	2	3
2	Toluca	0	3	3
7	Tijuana	0	1	1
4	Santos Laguna (a)	3	3	6
5	América	5	1	6
3	UNAM	1	2	3
6	Pachuca	1	4	5

Semifinals
2	Toluca	0	0	0
8	León	1	1	2
4	Santos Laguna	0	4	4
6	Pachuca (a)	2	2	4

Finals
8	León (a.e.t.)	2	2	4
6	Pachuca	3	0	3

Notes

- Teams were re-seeded each round.
- Team with more goals on aggregate after two matches advances.
- Away goals rule was applied in the quarterfinals and semifinals, but not in the final.
- In the quarterfinals and semifinals, if the two teams were tied on aggregate and away goals, the higher seeded team advances.
- In the final, if the two teams were tied after both legs, the match went to extra-time and, if necessary, a shootout.
- Both finalists qualified to the 2015–16 CONCACAF Champions League (in Pot 3).

==== Quarter-finals ====
Team 1	Agg.	Team 2	1st leg	2nd leg
León	3–3 (a)	Cruz Azul	1–1	2–2
Tijuana	1–3	Toluca	0–0	1–3
Pachuca	5–3	UNAM	1–1	4–2
América	6–6 (a)	Santos Laguna	5–3	1–3

==== Semi-finals ====
Team 1	Agg.	Team 2	1st leg	2nd leg
León	2–0	Toluca	1–0	1–0
Pachuca	4–4 (a)	Santos Laguna	2–0	2–4

==== Finals ====
Team 1	Agg.	Team 2	1st leg	2nd leg
León	4–3	Pachuca	2–3	2–0 (a.e.t.)

Notes

- If the two teams are tied after both legs, the higher seeded team advances.
- "Away goals" rule was applied in the play-off round, but not in the final.
- Both finalists qualified to the 2014–15 CONCACAF Champions League (champion in Pot A, runner-up in Pot B).

== Relegation ==
Pos	Team	'11 A Pts	'12 C Pts	'12 A Pts	'13 C Pts	'13 A Pts	'14 C Pts	Total Pts	Total Pld	Avg	Relegation
1	Cruz Azul	29	25	26	29	29	36	174	102	1.7059	
2	Santos Laguna	27	36	23	29	33	25	173	102	1.6961	
3	América	15	32	31	32	37	25	172	102	1.6863	
4	Morelia	26	31	27	30	27	21	162	102	1.5882	
5	UANL	28	31	21	35	25	21	161	102	1.5784	
6	Toluca	20	22	34	18	27	32	153	102	1.5000	
7	León	0	0	33	16	30	23	102	68	1.5000	
8	Tijuana	18	28	34	21	21	24	146	102	1.4314	
9	Monterrey	24	32	23	23	20	23	145	102	1.4216	
10	Querétaro	26	27	22	17	26	21	139	102	1.3627	
11	Pachuca	26	28	21	20	17	24	136	102	1.3333	
12	UNAM	25	16	23	29	11	25	129	102	1.2647	
13	Guadalajara	30	15	23	16	12	21	117	102	1.1471	
14	Chiapas	24	12	15	16	25	23	115	102	1.1275	
15	Puebla	22	19	13	19	19	18	110	102	1.0784	
16	Atlas	12	20	12	32	12	21	109	102	1.0686	
17	Veracruz	0	0	0	0	20	16	36	34	1.0588	
18	Atlante	19	16	20	13	12	18	98	102	0.9608	Relegated

Last update: May 8, 2014
