= 2024 Américas Kings League season =

Américas Kings League
- Season: 2024
- Dates: 16 January 2024 (Draft); 25 February - 4 May 2024 (First Split)
- Champions: Raniza FC (First Split)

The 2024 Américas Kings League season is the inaugural season of the Américas Kings League. League stage games will be played at Quarry Studios in Mexico City, Mexico.

== Teams ==
Team	Manager	Chairperson(s)
(Colombia) Atlético Parceros	(Spain) Manuel Lanzarote	(Colombia) James Rodríguez and Pelicanger
(Mexico) Club de Cuervos	(Mexico) Jacques Passy	(Mexico) Mercedes Roa
(Dominican Republic) Galácticos del Caribe	(Mexico) Lucas Ayala	(Dominican Republic) Vincent 'Will' Pérez and Angelo Valdés (Los Futbolitos) and Santiago Matías (Alofoke)
(United States) Los Aliens 1021	(Mexico) Efraín Velarde	(United States) Edwin Castro (Castro)
(Venezuela) Los Chamos FC	(Venezuela) Gabriel Cichero	(Venezuela) Donato Muñoz (TheDonato) and Flavio Broianigo (YOLO)
(Argentina) Muchachos FC	(Mexico) Rafael Puente Jr.	(Argentina) Jero Freixas
(Mexico) Olimpo United	(Mexico) Alejandro Castro	(Mexico) Javier Hernández (Chicharito)
(Mexico) Peluche Caligari	(Mexico) Ángel Reyna	(Mexico) Álex (Escorpión Dorado) and Gabriel Montiel (Werevertumorro)
(Peru) Persas FC	(Mexico) Víctor Chaires	(Peru) Andy Merino (ElZeein)
(Uruguay) Raniza FC	(Mexico) Severo Meza	(Uruguay) Diego Balsa (BarcaGamer) and (Mexico) Alana Flores (AlanaLaRana)
(Chile) Real Titán	(Spain) Pol Font	(Chile) Germán Garmendia
(Colombia) West Santos FC	(Canada) Isidro Sánchez	(Colombia) Luis Villa (Westcol) and (Puerto Rico) Austin Santos (Arcángel)

== Draft ==
A draft for the teams to select their ten regular players, which will be joined in games by guest 11th and 12th Players, was held on 16 January 2024. Teams would have the option to "steal" a player picked between the fourth and eighth rounds, with the team on the receiving end of the steal being given the next pick to select a new player.

Selected players in the 2024 Américas Kings League Draft (Note: Rounds 4, 5 and 6 were combined into a single "triple pick" round, wherein each team selected its three players in one go.)
Rd.	No.	Pos.	Player	Team
1	1	FW	(Mexico) Baruc Ochoa	(Uruguay) Raniza FC
1	2	MF	(Mexico) Alain Villanueva	(Venezuela) Los Chamos FC
1	3	FW	(Mexico) Juan Celada	(Colombia) West Santos FC
1	4	MF	(Mexico) Gustavo Guillén	(Mexico) Peluche Caligari
1	5	MF	(Mexico) Martín Rodríguez	(Chile) Real Titán
1	6	FW	(Mexico) Juan Hernández (Note: Muchachos' original first pick, Jesús Paganoni, had withdrawn from the Draft pool, unbeknownst to the team staff, which led to them being allowed to pick Hernández in his place.)	(Argentina) Muchachos FC
1	7	MF	(Colombia) Brihan Gutiérrez	(Peru) Persas FC
1	8	DF	(Mexico) César Bernal	(Dominican Republic) Galácticos del Caribe
1	9	DF	(Mexico) Patricio Arias	(Colombia) Atlético Parceros
1	10	MF	(Mexico) Santiago Lagarde	(Mexico) Club de Cuervos
1	11	MF	(Mexico) César Villaluz	(United States) Los Aliens 1021
1	12	GK	(Mexico) Juan Jiménez	(Mexico) Olimpo United
2	13	FW	(Brazil) Flavio Nogueira	(Mexico) Olimpo United
2	14	DF	(Mexico) Anferny Rebollar	(United States) Los Aliens 1021
2	15	FW	(Argentina) Martín Bravo	(Mexico) Club de Cuervos
2	16	MF	(Mexico) Didier Uribe	(Colombia) Atlético Parceros
2	17	DF	(Mexico) Carlos Salazar	(Dominican Republic) Galácticos del Caribe
2	18	DF	(Argentina) Nicolás Jalil	(Peru) Persas FC
2	19	DF	(Mexico) Erik Vera	(Argentina) Muchachos FC
2	20	MF	(Mexico) Christopher Pedraza	(Chile) Real Titán
2	21	MF	(Mexico) Emiliano López	(Mexico) Peluche Caligari
2	22	DF	(Mexico) Osmar Mares	(Colombia) West Santos FC
2	23	MF	(Colombia) Jairo Tapia	(Venezuela) Los Chamos FC
2	24	FW	(Mexico) José Rochín	(Uruguay) Raniza FC
3	25	MF	(Colombia) Yair Arias	(Uruguay) Raniza FC
3	26	MF	(Mexico) Diego Franco	(Venezuela) Los Chamos FC
3	27	GK	(Mexico) Silverio Rocchi	(Colombia) West Santos FC
3	28	FW	(Mexico) Ismael Valadez	(Mexico) Peluche Caligari
3	29	FW	(Mexico) Erik Guzmán	(Chile) Real Titán
3	30	GK	(Argentina) Franco Colagrossi	(Argentina) Muchachos FC
3	31	DF	(Mexico) Rafael Martínez	(Peru) Persas FC
3	32	MF	(Mexico) Adrián Monroy	(Dominican Republic) Galácticos del Caribe
3	33	DF	(Mexico) Jorge Ruiz	(Colombia) Atlético Parceros
3	34	MF	(Mexico) Eder López	(Mexico) Club de Cuervos
3	35	FW	(Mexico) José Nieto	(United States) Los Aliens 1021
3	36	FW	(Mexico) Jacob Morales	(Mexico) Olimpo United
4	37	FW	(Mexico) Diego Vivian	(Mexico) Olimpo United
5	38	MF	(Mexico) Jesús Pérez	(Mexico) Olimpo United
6	39	MF	(Mexico) Brayan Hernández	(Dominican Republic) Galácticos del Caribe (stolen from Olimpo United)
4	40	GK	(Mexico) Carlos López	(United States) Los Aliens 1021
5	41	MF	(Mexico) Juan Pablo Marín	(United States) Los Aliens 1021
6	42	MF	(Mexico) Kevin Quiñones	(United States) Los Aliens 1021
4	43	MF	(Mexico) Donovan Martínez	(Mexico) Club de Cuervos
5	44	MF	(Mexico) Rafael Aja	(Mexico) Club de Cuervos
6	45	MF	(Mexico) Manuel Viniegra	(Mexico) Club de Cuervos
4	46	MF	(Mexico) Alejandro Aválos	(Colombia) Atlético Parceros
5	47	GK	(Mexico) Edgar Álvarez	(Colombia) Atlético Parceros
6	48	GK	(Mexico) Patricio Navarro	(Colombia) Atlético Parceros
4	49	GK	(Mexico) Julio Torres	(Dominican Republic) Galácticos del Caribe
5	50	MF	(Mexico) Jhonatan García	(Dominican Republic) Galácticos del Caribe
6	51	MF	(Mexico) Pablo Sámano	(Dominican Republic) Galácticos del Caribe
4	52	FW	(Mexico) Alejandro García	(Peru) Persas FC
5	53	MF	(Mexico) José Islas	(Peru) Persas FC
6	54	MF	(Mexico) Alejandro Díaz	(Peru) Persas FC
4	55	MF	(Mexico) Gerardo Lugo	(Argentina) Muchachos FC
5	56	FW	(Mexico) Abner Rebollar	(Argentina) Muchachos FC
6	57	DF	(Mexico) Gustavo Lua	(Argentina) Muchachos FC
4	58	FW	(Mexico) Andrés Guzmán	(Chile) Real Titán
5	59	MF	(Mexico) Edson Trejo	(Chile) Real Titán
6	60	GK	(Mexico) Paul Cruz	(Chile) Real Titán
4	61	GK	(Mexico) James Hernández	(Mexico) Peluche Caligari
5	62	DF	(Mexico) Diego Flores	(Mexico) Peluche Caligari
6	63	FW	(Mexico) Alejandro Vázquez	(Mexico) Peluche Caligari
4	64	MF	(Colombia) William Rojas	(Colombia) West Santos FC
5	65	FW	(Mexico) Luis Robles	(Colombia) Atlético Parceros (stolen from West Santos FC)
6	66	GK	(Mexico) Moisés Dabbah	(Colombia) West Santos FC
4	67	GK	(Mexico) Diego Arriaga	(Venezuela) Los Chamos FC
5	68	DF	(Mexico) Martín Pureco	(Venezuela) Los Chamos FC
6	69	MF	(Mexico) Asdrúbal Arcos	(Venezuela) Los Chamos FC (Note: Arcos was stolen by Club de Cuervos, but Los Chamos immediately used their own steal option to take him back.)
4	70	GK	(Mexico) Yosgart Gutiérrez	(Uruguay) Raniza FC
5	71	MF	(Mexico) Ricardo Villavicencio	(Uruguay) Raniza FC
6	72	MF	(Mexico) Israel Jiménez	(Argentina) Muchachos FC (stolen from Raniza FC)
7	73	MF	(Mexico) Axel Martínez	(Uruguay) Raniza FC
7	74	MF	(Mexico) Christopher Ayala	(Venezuela) Los Chamos FC
7	75	DF	(Mexico) Juan Martínez	(Colombia) West Santos FC
7	76	DF	(Mexico) Francisco García	(Mexico) Peluche Caligari
7	77	MF	(Mexico) Javier Meraz	(Chile) Real Titán
7	78	MF	(Mexico) Irving Melgar	(Peru) Persas FC
7	79	FW	(Mexico) Erick Cerda	(Dominican Republic) Galácticos del Caribe
7	80	MF	(Mexico) Juan Suárez	(Colombia) Atlético Parceros
7	81	DF	(Mexico) David Tamayo	(Mexico) Club de Cuervos
7	82	FW	(Mexico) Damián Scarinci	(United States) Los Aliens 1021
7	83	MF	(Mexico) Iñaki Domínguez	(Mexico) Olimpo United
7	84	MF	(Mexico) Julio García	(Argentina) Muchachos FC (Note: Muchachos' seventh-round pick was moved to the end of the round after they failed to select a player within the 20-second time limit in their original turn.)
8	85	FW	(United States) Juan Olvera	(Mexico) Olimpo United
8	86	MF	(United States) Querubín Romero	(United States) Los Aliens 1021
8	87	MF	(Mexico) Alfonso Rosales	(Mexico) Club de Cuervos
8	88	FW	(Mexico) Diego Gutiérrez	(Colombia) Atlético Parceros
8	89	MF	(Mexico) Abner Monreal	(Dominican Republic) Galácticos del Caribe
8	90	MF	(Mexico) Rafael Monroy	(Peru) Persas FC
8	91	FW	(Mexico) Jerónimo Amione	(United States) Los Aliens 1021 (stolen from Muchachos FC)
8	92	FW	(Mexico) Santiago Martínez	(Chile) Real Titán
8	93	FW	(Mexico) Gabriel Morales	(Mexico) Peluche Caligari
8	94	MF	(Colombia) Samuel Rojas	(Colombia) West Santos FC
8	95	FW	(Mexico) Kevin Olivares	(Venezuela) Los Chamos FC
8	96	FW	(Mexico) Sergio Vázquez	(Uruguay) Raniza FC
9	97	FW	(Mexico) Adolfo Valdez	(Uruguay) Raniza FC
9	98	DF	(Venezuela) Carlos Guedez	(Venezuela) Los Chamos FC
9	99	MF	(Colombia) Felipe Jiménez	(Colombia) West Santos FC
9	100	FW	(Mexico) Dustin Salazar	(Mexico) Peluche Caligari
9	101	MF	(Mexico) Cristian Chaparro	(Chile) Real Titán
9	102	MF	(Mexico) Edwin Cárdenas	(Argentina) Muchachos FC
9	103	FW	(Mexico) Fernando Olmedo	(Peru) Persas FC
9	104	DF	(Mexico) Carlos Valencia	(Mexico) Olimpo United
9	105	MF	(Mexico) Alfredo Fierro	(Colombia) West Santos FC
9	106	DF	(Mexico) Diego Sanjuan	(Mexico) Club de Cuervos
9	107	GK	(Mexico) Hugo Murga	(Uruguay) Raniza FC
9	108	GK	(Mexico) Jonathan Mateos	(Mexico) Olimpo United
10	109	MF	(Mexico) José Rodríguez	(Mexico) Olimpo United
10	110	GK	(Mexico) Óscar Medina	(United States) Los Aliens 1021
10	111	GK	(Mexico) Eli Saadia	(Mexico) Club de Cuervos
10	112	DF	(Mexico) César Marín	(Colombia) Atlético Parceros
10	113	GK	(Mexico) Ricardo Ferriño	(Dominican Republic) Galácticos del Caribe
10	114	GK	(Argentina) Ariel Pérez	(Peru) Persas FC
10	115	FW	(Spain) Josep Alonso	(Argentina) Muchachos FC
10	116	GK	(Mexico) Omar Láscari	(Chile) Real Titán
10	117	DF	(Mexico) Alejandro Corona	(Mexico) Peluche Caligari
10	118	MF	(Mexico) José Miramontes	(Colombia) West Santos FC
10	119	GK	(Mexico) Luis Nava	(Venezuela) Los Chamos FC
10	120	MF	(Mexico) César Romo	(Uruguay) Raniza FC

== First Split (February–May 2024) ==
The first split began on 25 February 2024 and is set to conclude with its Final Four on 4 May.

=== League phase standings ===
Pos	Team	Pld	W	WSO	LSO	L	GF	GA	GD	Pts	Qualification
1	(Chile) Real Titán	11	8	0	0	3	41	33	+8	24	Playoff semifinals and 2024 Kings World Cup
2	(Mexico) Peluche Caligari	11	6	1	0	4	52	45	+7	20	Playoff second round and 2024 Kings World Cup
3	(Uruguay) Raniza FC	11	5	2	0	4	35	28	+7	19	Playoff second round and 2024 Kings World Cup
4	(Colombia) West Santos FC	11	5	0	3	3	45	35	+10	18	Playoff second round and 2024 Kings World Cup
5	(Peru) Persas FC	11	4	2	1	4	28	29	−1	17	Playoff first round and 2024 Kings World Cup
6	(Mexico) Olimpo United	11	4	1	3	3	34	37	−3	17	Playoff first round and 2024 Kings World Cup
7	(Dominican Republic) Galácticos del Caribe	11	3	3	1	4	39	44	−5	16	Playoff first round and 2024 Kings World Cup
8	(Argentina) Muchachos FC	11	4	1	1	5	41	41	0	15	Playoff first round and 2024 Kings World Cup
9	(Colombia) Atlético Parceros	11	4	1	1	5	35	36	−1	15	Playoff first round and 2024 Kings World Cup Redemption Game
10	(Mexico) Club de Cuervos	11	4	1	1	5	45	48	−3	15	Playoff first round and 2024 Kings World Cup Redemption Game
11	(United States) Los Aliens 1021	11	4	0	1	6	33	37	−4	13	2024 Kings World Cup Redemption Game
12	(Venezuela) Los Chamos FC	11	3	0	0	8	35	50	−15	9	2024 Kings World Cup Redemption Game

Source: Américas Kings League
Rules for classification: 1) Points; 2) Goal difference; 3) Goals scored

=== Playoffs ===
First round 27 April ― Quarry Studios
5	(Peru) Persas FC (p)	0 (3)
10	(Mexico) Club de Cuervos	0 (1)
7	(Dominican Republic) Galácticos del Caribe	8
8	(Argentina) Muchachos FC	6
6	(Mexico) Olimpo United	5
9	(Colombia) Atlético Parceros	4

Second round 28 April ― Quarry Studios
4	(Colombia) West Santos FC	4
5	(Peru) Persas FC	5
2	(Mexico) Peluche Caligari	3
7	(Dominican Republic) Galácticos del Caribe	7
3	(Uruguay) Raniza FC	7
6	(Mexico) Olimpo United	3

Semifinals; 4 May ― Estadio Azteca
1	(Chile) Real Titán	4
5	(Peru) Persas FC	1
7	(Dominican Republic) Galácticos del Caribe	1
3	(Uruguay) Raniza FC	8

Final; 4 May ― Estadio Azteca
1	(Chile) Real Titán	2
3	(Uruguay) Raniza FC	4

Champion
Raniza FC
1st title
