= Clausura 2017 Liga MX final phase =

Clausura 2017 Final phase
Tournament details
- Country: Mexico
- Dates: 10 May–28 May 2017
- Teams: 8

Final positions
- Champions: Guadalajara (12th title)
- Runners-up: UANL

Tournament statistics
- Matches played: 14
- Goals scored: 36 (2.57 per match)
- Attendance: 506,589 (36,185 per match)

The Clausura 2017 Liga MX championship stage commonly known as liguilla (mini league) was played from 10 May to 28 May 2017. A total of eight teams were competing in the championship stage to decide the champions of the Clausura 2017 Liga MX season. C.D Guadalajara won the final after defeating UANL 4–3 on aggregate. Both finalists qualified to the 2018 CONCACAF Champions League. However, since UANL had already qualified for that tournament by winning the Apertura 2016 Liga MX final, their berth earned through the Clausura passed to the non-finalist with the best aggregate regular season record, Tijuana.

== Qualified teams ==
Pos	Team	Pld	W	D	L	GF	GA	GD	Pts	Qualification or relegation
1	Tijuana	17	9	4	4	30	22	+8	31	Advance to Liguilla
2	Monterrey	17	7	6	4	26	18	+8	27	Advance to Liguilla
3	Guadalajara	17	7	6	4	21	18	+3	27	Advance to Liguilla
4	Toluca	17	8	3	6	21	20	+1	27	Advance to Liguilla
5	Santos Laguna	17	5	11	1	25	20	+5	26	Advance to Liguilla
6	Atlas	17	7	5	5	24	21	+3	26	Advance to Liguilla
7	UANL	17	7	4	6	26	12	+14	25	Advance to Liguilla
8	Morelia	17	6	6	5	19	16	+3	24	Advance to Liguilla

Updated to match(es) played on 7 May 2017. Source: Liga MX
Rules for classification: 1) Points; 2) Goal difference; 3) Number of goals scored; 4) Head-to-head results between tied teams; 5) Number of goals scored away; 6) Highest relegation coefficient; 7) Fair Play points

== Format ==
- Teams are re-seeded each round.
- Team with more goals on aggregate after two matches advances.
- Away goals rule is applied in the quarterfinals and semifinals, but not the final.
- In the quarterfinals and semifinals, if the two teams are tied on aggregate and away goals, the higher seeded team advances.
- In the final, if the two teams are tied after both legs, the match goes to extra time and, if necessary, a shoot-out.
- Both finalists qualify to the 2018 CONCACAF Champions League (in Pot 3).

=== Bracket ===
Quarterfinals
3	Guadalajara (s)	0	1	1
6	Atlas	1	0	1
4	Toluca	4	1	5
5	Santos Laguna	1	3	4
1	Tijuana	0	2	2
8	Morelia	1	0	1
2	Monterrey	1	0	1
7	UANL	4	2	6

Semifinals
3	Guadalajara (s)	1	1	2
4	Toluca	1	1	2
1	Tijuana	0	0	0
7	UANL	2	2	4

Finals
3	Guadalajara	2	2	4
7	UANL	2	1	3

== Quarterfinals ==
Team 1	Agg.	Team 2	1st leg	2nd leg
Morelia	1–2	Tijuana	1–0	0–2
UANL	6–1	Monterrey	4–1	2–0
Atlas	1–1 (s)	Guadalajara	1–0	0–1
Santos Laguna	4–5	Toluca	1–4	3–1

All times are UTC−6 except for match in Tijuana

=== First leg ===
10 May 2017
19:30

UANL	4–1	Monterrey
Gignac 20', 69'; Dueñas 45', 90+2'	Report	Basanta 90+1'

Estadio Universitario, San Nicolás de los Garza
Attendance: 41,612
Referee: César Arturo Ramos (Sinaloa)

10 May 2017
21:30

Santos Laguna	1–4	Toluca
Rodríguez 53'	Report	Hauche 14'; Triverio 55'; Uribe 79'; Esquivel 88'

Estadio Corona, Torreón
Attendance: 22,073
Referee: Paul Delgadillo (Jalisco)

11 May 2017
19:30

Morelia	1–0	Tijuana
Sansores 10'	Report

Estadio Morelos, Morelia
Attendance: 26,679
Referee: Erick Yair Miranda (Guanajuato)

11 May 2017
21:30

Atlas	1–0	Guadalajara
Alustiza 30'	Report

Estadio Jalisco, Guadalajara
Attendance: 46,605
Referee: Jorge Antonio Pérez (Veracruz)

=== Second leg ===
13 May 2017
19:00

Monterrey	0–2	UANL
	Report	Gignac 45+4', 68'

Estadio BBVA Bancomer, Guadalupe
Attendance: 52,969
Referee: Fernando Hernández (Mexico City)

UANL won 6–1 on aggregate.

13 May 2017
21:00

Toluca	1–3	Santos Laguna
Ríos 42'	Report	Triverio 21' (o.g.); Rivas 45'; Furch 60'

Estadio Nemesio Díez, Toluca
Attendance: 25,544
Referee: Marco Antonio Ortiz (Durango)

Toluca won 5–4 on aggregate.

14 May 2017
18:00

Guadalajara	1–0	Atlas
Pineda 45'	Report

Estadio Chivas, Zapopan
Attendance: 42,173
Referee: Luis Enrique Santander (Guanajuato)

1–1 on aggregate and tied on away goals. Guadalajara advanced for being the higher seed in the classification table.

14 May 2017
18:00 (UTC−8)

Tijuana	2–0	Morelia
Martín 42'; Lucero 80'	Report

Estadio Caliente, Tijuana
Attendance: 27,333
Referee: Oscar Macías Romo (Aguascalientes)

Tijuana won 2–1 on aggregate.

== Semifinals ==
Team 1	Agg.	Team 2	1st leg	2nd leg
UANL	4–0	Tijuana	2–0	2–0
Toluca	2–2 (s)	Guadalajara	1–1	1–1

All times are UTC−6 except for match in Tijuana

=== First leg ===
18 May 2017
19:30

Toluca	1–1	Guadalajara
Uribe 85'	Report	Pizarro 83'

Estadio Nemesio Díez, Toluca
Attendance: 25,671
Referee: Oscar Macías Romo (Aguascalientes)

18 May 2017
21:30

UANL	2–0	Tijuana
Zelarayán 42'; Aquino 45'	Report

Estadio Universitario, San Nicolás de los Garza
Attendance: 41,426
Referee: Marco Antonio Ortiz (Durango)

=== Second leg ===
21 May 2017
18:06

Guadalajara	1–1	Toluca
Calderón 30'	Report	Uribe 48'

Estadio Chivas, Zapopan
Attendance: 40,182
Referee: Luis Enrique Santander (Guanajuato)

2–2 on aggregate and tied on away goals. Guadalajara advanced for being the higher seed in the classification table.

21 May 2017
18:00 (UTC−8)

Tijuana	0–2	UANL
	Report	Aquino 64'; Damm 90+2'

Estadio Caliente, Tijuana
Attendance: 27,333
Referee: Jorge Antonio Pérez (Veracruz)

UANL won 4–0 on aggregate.

== Finals ==
Team 1	Agg.	Team 2	1st leg	2nd leg
UANL	3–4	Guadalajara	2–2	1–2

All times are UTC−6

=== First leg ===
25 May 2017
21:00

UANL	2–2	Guadalajara
Gignac 85', 88'	Report	Pulido 23'; Pizarro 42'

Estadio Universitario, San Nicolás de los Garza
Attendance: 41,625
Referee: Óscar Macías Romo (Aguascalientes)

UANL	Guadalajara

GK	1	(Argentina) Nahuel Guzmán
DF	16	(Peru) Luis Advíncula		(substituted off) 72'
DF	3	(Brazil) Juninho (c)
DF	4	(Mexico) Hugo Ayala		(substituted off) 46'
DF	28	(Mexico) Luis Rodríguez
MF	19	(Argentina) Guido Pizarro
MF	29	(Mexico) Jesús Dueñas	(yellow card) 90+4'
MF	20	(Mexico) Javier Aquino
MF	8	(Argentina) Lucas Zelarayán		(substituted off) 62'
MF	18	(Argentina) Ismael Sosa
FW	10	(France) André-Pierre Gignac
Substitutions:
GK	22	(Mexico) Enrique Palos
DF	21	(Colombia) Francisco Meza		(substituted on) 46'
DF	24	(Mexico) José Rivas
MF	11	(Mexico) Damián Álvarez		(substituted on) 72'
MF	17	(United States) Jose Francisco Torres
MF	25	(Mexico) Jürgen Damm		(substituted on) 62'
FW	26	(Chile) Eduardo Vargas
Manager:
(Brazil) Ricardo Ferretti

GK	30	(Mexico) Rodolfo Cota	(yellow card) 79'
DF	6	(Mexico) Edwin Hernández		(substituted off) 77'
DF	3	(Mexico) Carlos Salcido (c)
DF	2	(Mexico) Oswaldo Alanís
DF	17	(Mexico) Jesús Sánchez
MF	23	(Mexico) José Juan Vázquez
MF	25	(Mexico) Michael Pérez
MF	18	(Mexico) Néstor Calderón		(substituted off) 61'
MF	7	(Mexico) Orbelín Pineda		(substituted off) 72'
MF	20	(Mexico) Rodolfo Pizarro
FW	9	(Mexico) Alan Pulido
Substitutions:
GK	34	(Mexico) Miguel Jiménez
DF	4	(Mexico) Jair Pereira
DF	16	(Mexico) Miguel Ángel Ponce	(yellow card) 84'	(substituted on) 72'
MF	19	(Mexico) Guillermo Martínez		(substituted on) 77'
MF	21	(Mexico) Carlos Fierro		(substituted on) 61'
FW	10	(Mexico) Eduardo López
FW	97	(Mexico) Michelle Benítez
Manager:
(Argentina) Matías Almeyda

Assistant referees:
Marcos Quintero Huitron (Jalisco)
Jimmy Acosta Montesinos (Chiapas)
Fourth official:
Marco Antonio Ortiz (Durango)

=== Second leg ===
28 May 2017
18:06

Guadalajara	2–1	UANL
Pulido 17'; Vázquez 70'	Report	Sosa 88'

Estadio Chivas, Zapopan
Attendance: 45,354
Referee: Luis Enrique Santander (Guanajuato)

Guadalajara won 4–3 on aggregate

Guadalajara	UANL

GK	30	(Mexico) Rodolfo Cota
DF	6	(Mexico) Edwin Hernández
DF	2	(Mexico) Oswaldo Alanís
DF	3	(Mexico) Carlos Salcido (c)
DF	4	(Mexico) Jair Pereira
DF	17	(Mexico) Jesús Sánchez
MF	23	(Mexico) José Juan Vázquez	(yellow card) 90'
MF	20	(Mexico) Rodolfo Pizarro
MF	18	(Mexico) Néstor Calderón		(substituted off) 59'
MF	7	(Mexico) Orbelín Pineda		(substituted off) 90+3'
FW	9	(Mexico) Alan Pulido	(yellow card) 86'
Substitutions:
GK	34	(Mexico) Miguel Jiménez
DF	5	(Mexico) Hedgardo Marín
DF	16	(Mexico) Miguel Ángel Ponce
MF	21	(Mexico) Carlos Fierro		(substituted on) 59'
MF	25	(Mexico) Michael Pérez
FW	10	(Mexico) Eduardo López
FW	14	(Mexico) Ángel Zaldívar		(substituted on) 90+3'
Manager:
(Argentina) Matías Almeyda

GK	1	(Argentina) Nahuel Guzmán	(yellow card) 86'
DF	27	(Mexico) Alberto Acosta		(substituted off) 59'
DF	3	(Brazil) Juninho (c)
DF	4	(Mexico) Hugo Ayala		(substituted off) 66'
DF	28	(Mexico) Luis Rodríguez		(substituted off) 73'
MF	20	(Mexico) Javier Aquino	(yellow card) 14'
MF	19	(Argentina) Guido Pizarro
MF	29	(Mexico) Jesús Dueñas
MF	25	(Mexico) Jürgen Damm
FW	18	(Argentina) Ismael Sosa	(yellow card) 90+1'
FW	10	(France) André-Pierre Gignac	(yellow card) 73'
Substitutions:
GK	22	(Mexico) Enrique Palos
DF	16	(Peru) Luis Advíncula
DF	21	(Colombia) Francisco Meza		(substituted on) 66'
DF	24	(Mexico) José Rivas
MF	11	(Mexico) Damián Álvarez	(yellow card) 83'	(substituted on) 73'
FW	8	(Argentina) Lucas Zelarayán		(substituted on) 59'
FW	26	(Chile) Eduardo Vargas
Manager:
(Brazil) Ricardo Ferretti

Assistant referees:
Alberto Morin Méndez (Chihuahua)
Salvador Rodríguez Gorrocino (Jalisco)
Fourth official:
Jorge Antonio Pérez Durán (Veracruz)

Clausura 2017 winners:
Guadalajara
12th Title

== Goalscorers ==
6 goals

- (France) André-Pierre Gignac (UANL)

3 goals

- (Colombia) Fernando Uribe (Toluca)

2 goals

- (Mexico) Javier Aquino (UANL)
- (Mexico) Jesús Dueñas (UANL)
- (Mexico) Alan Pulido (Guadalajara)
- (Mexico) Rodolfo Pizarro (Guadalajara)

1 goal

- (Argentina) Matías Alustiza (Atlas)
- (Argentina) José María Basanta (Monterrey)
- (Mexico) Néstor Calderón (Guadalajara)
- (Mexico) Jürgen Damm (UANL)
- (Mexico) Carlos Esquivel (Toluca)
- (Argentina) Julio Furch (Santos Laguna)
- (Argentina) Gabriel Hauche (Toluca)
- (Argentina) Juan Martín Lucero (Tijuana)
- (Mexico) Henry Martín (Tijuana)
- (Mexico) Orbelín Pineda (Guadalajara)
- (Mexico) Antonio Ríos (Toluca)
- (Mexico) Ulises Rivas (Santos Laguna)
- (Uruguay) Jonathan Rodríguez (Santos Laguna)
- (Mexico) Miguel Sansores (Morelia)
- (Argentina) Ismael Sosa (UANL)
- (Argentina) Enrique Triverio (Toluca)
- (Mexico) José Juan Vázquez (Guadalajara)
- (Argentina) Lucas Zelarayán (UANL)

Own goals

- (Argentina) Enrique Triverio (for Santos Laguna)
