= Carlos Salcido =

Mexican footballer (born 1980)

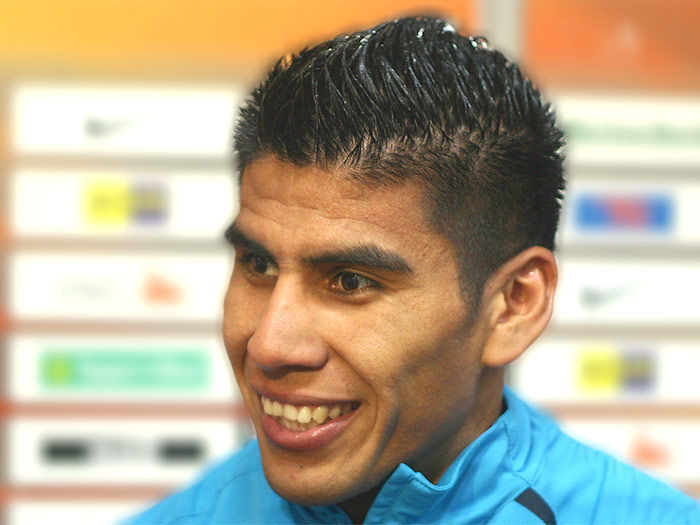
- Salcido in 2008

Personal information
- Full name: Carlos Arnoldo Salcido Flores
- Date of birth: 2 April 1980 (age 46)
- Place of birth: Ocotlán, Jalisco, Mexico
- Height: 1.75 m (5 ft 9 in)
- Positions: Left-back; defensive midfielder; centre-back

Youth career
- 1999–2001: Deportivo Oro

Senior career*
Years	Team	Apps	(Gls)
2001–2006	Guadalajara	96	(2)
2006–2010	PSV	121	(3)
2010–2012	Fulham	23	(0)
2011–2012	→ Tigres UANL (loan)	37	(1)
2012–2014	Tigres UANL	86	(5)
2014–2019	Guadalajara	117	(2)
2019	→ Veracruz (loan)	29	(0)
Total		509	(13)

International career
2012	Mexico Olympic (O.P.)	10	(0)
2004–2014	Mexico	123	(10)

Managerial career
- 2024: Halcones
Medal record
Men's football
Representing Mexico
Olympic Games
Gold medal – first place	2012 London	Team
CONCACAF Gold Cup
Winner	2011 United States
Runner-up	2007 United States
- * Club domestic league appearances and goals

Carlos Arnoldo Salcido Flores (Latin American Spanish: [ˈkaɾlos aɾˈnoldo salˈsiðo ˈfloɾes]; born 2 April 1980) is a Mexican former professional footballer. He started his career as a centre-back and played most of it as left-back, then converted to defensive midfielder and ended it as centre-back. He won the 2012 Olympic gold medal.

Salcido made his professional debut with Guadalajara before establishing himself as a key figure at PSV Eindhoven, where he served as vice-captain and became the first Mexican player to win the Eredivisie title. He later joined Fulham in the Premier League, spending one season in England before returning to Mexico to play for Tigres UANL. In 2014, Salcido rejoined Guadalajara, helping the club secure a league title, and ultimately concluded his career with Veracruz.

Internationally, Salcido represented the national team in three World Cups: 2006, 2010, 2014 and three Gold Cups: 2005, 2007, 2011, He was a member of Mexico's team that won the gold medal at the 2012 Summer Olympics. He made his first national team appearance at the age of 24 in 2004. In 2014, after the World Cup in Brazil, Salcido officially retired from the national team.

Salcido served as the first president of the Liga de Balompié Mexicano. In 2024 he began his career as a manager, his first position was at the head of Halcones FC, a team that participates in the Liga Premier de México - Serie A.

== Club career ==
=== Guadalajara ===
Carlos Salcido began his football career at his nearby home town team Chivas. He progressed through the ranks having successful seasons with the youth teams until he was called up to the national team in 2001, making his official debut in the Primera División de México on 22 July 2001 in a 1–1 draw against La Piedad in 2001. Salcido disappeared from Chivas' first squad until 2003, when he regained trust as a good defender. He would go on to play five half-seasons registering two goals in 105 matches. Salcido was a 2005 and 2006 Copa Libertadores Semifinalist with Guadalajara and a Runner-Up in Primera División (First Division), losing against Pumas in penalty shoot-outs in 2004. Salcido made his final league appearance for Guadalajara on 1 April 2006 against Pachuca in a 3–2 win.

=== PSV Eindhoven ===
In June and July following the 2006 FIFA World Cup, press speculation linked Salcido to several clubs in Europe, with one report claiming that he had agreed to sign for FA Premier League club Arsenal. However, these speculations proved false as he signed a four-year contract with Dutch champions PSV Eindhoven on 10 July 2006.

Salcido was a first team regular in the Eredivisie under Coach Ronald Koeman, starting 33 of 34 league games in his first season at the club, which saw PSV crowned Dutch champions. On 18 November 2006, he scored his first goal in Europe, a spectacular long-distance goal in a match against Excelsior Rotterdam that ended 4–0. Salcido also appeared in the 2006–07 UEFA Champions League. In total Salcido played 48 Eredivisie and Champions League games that season, finishing 46 of them. For the 2007–08 season, Salcido was awarded the number 3 shirt, previously worn by Michael Reiziger. He was also named the team Vice-Captain after Timmy Simons was promoted to team Captain following the departure of former captain Phillip Cocu. In his second season at PSV Salcido played 33 games in the Dutch League, and 6 games in the Champions League, Salcido was crowned champion for the second straight year with PSV. In his third season with the club he played 28 games in the Dutch League scoring two goals. In 2009–10 Salcido played 27 Eredivisie matches and 9 UEFA Europa League matches. Salcido was a substitute for the beginning of the 2010–11 Eredivisie and the Europa League, where he did not appear in any matches but was soon transferred to Fulham of England.

=== Fulham ===
After a good performance with Mexico at the 2010 FIFA World Cup, it was reported that Liverpool wanted to sign Salcido.

On 26 August 2010 it was announced that Fulham had agreed a £3.6 million deal with PSV to sign the player but the deal was still subject to the player agreeing terms. The deal was then finalised the next day. He made his debut against Blackburn Rovers on 18 September 2010. He contributed an assist in the 56th minute, when his cross pass fell to American player Clint Dempsey, who headed it into the net from 8 yards to level the game at 1–1. He played all 90 minutes. He left the club in August 2011 on loan to club Tigres UANL.

=== Tigres UANL ===
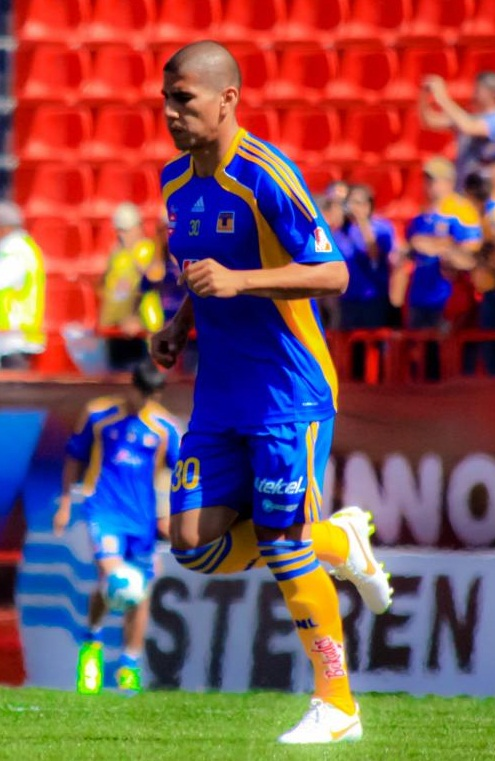
Salcido with Tigres UANL in 2011

On 17 August 2011, it was announced that Salcido was transferred to Mexican side Tigres UANL on a season-long loan. After a robbery at his home in Claygate, London, Salcido requested to be transferred back to Mexico due to his family feeling unsettled. In his first season back in Mexico, Salcido helped Tigres win their third league title, and their first title in over thirty years.

On 7 March 2012, Fulham confirmed that Salcido had joined Tigres on a permanent basis.

=== Return to Guadalajara ===
On 20 May 2014, Guadalajara officially announced the signing of Salcido. After his participation at the World Cup, Salcido made his debut for Guadalajara in a pre-season friendly match 9 July 2014 at the StubHub Center in Carson, California. Against Cruz Azul, the match ended in a 2–1 win for Guadalajara, with Salcido playing the entire match. Salcido made his first league appearance for Guadalajara 20 July 2014 in a match against Chiapas and played for the entire match.

Following the departure of captain Omar Bravo, Salcedo was named main captain of the club for the 2016–17 season. On 24 November 2016, he scored his first goal for his second stint with Guadalajara from a penalty against rivals América.

In April 2017, Guadalajara won the Clausura Copa MX final against Monarcas Morelia. The following month, they disputed Clausura championship against Tigres UANL, as Guadalajara would go on to win the title, finishing an eleven-year-long drought of league titles. As a result, Guadalajara won their first Double since the 1969–70 season.

=== Veracruz ===
In January 2019, he officially joined Veracruz. On 4 February he made his debut against his former club Guadalajara in a 0–0 draw. He played his final match in the Liga MX on 23 November against his former club Guadalajara in a 3–1 loss.

== International career ==
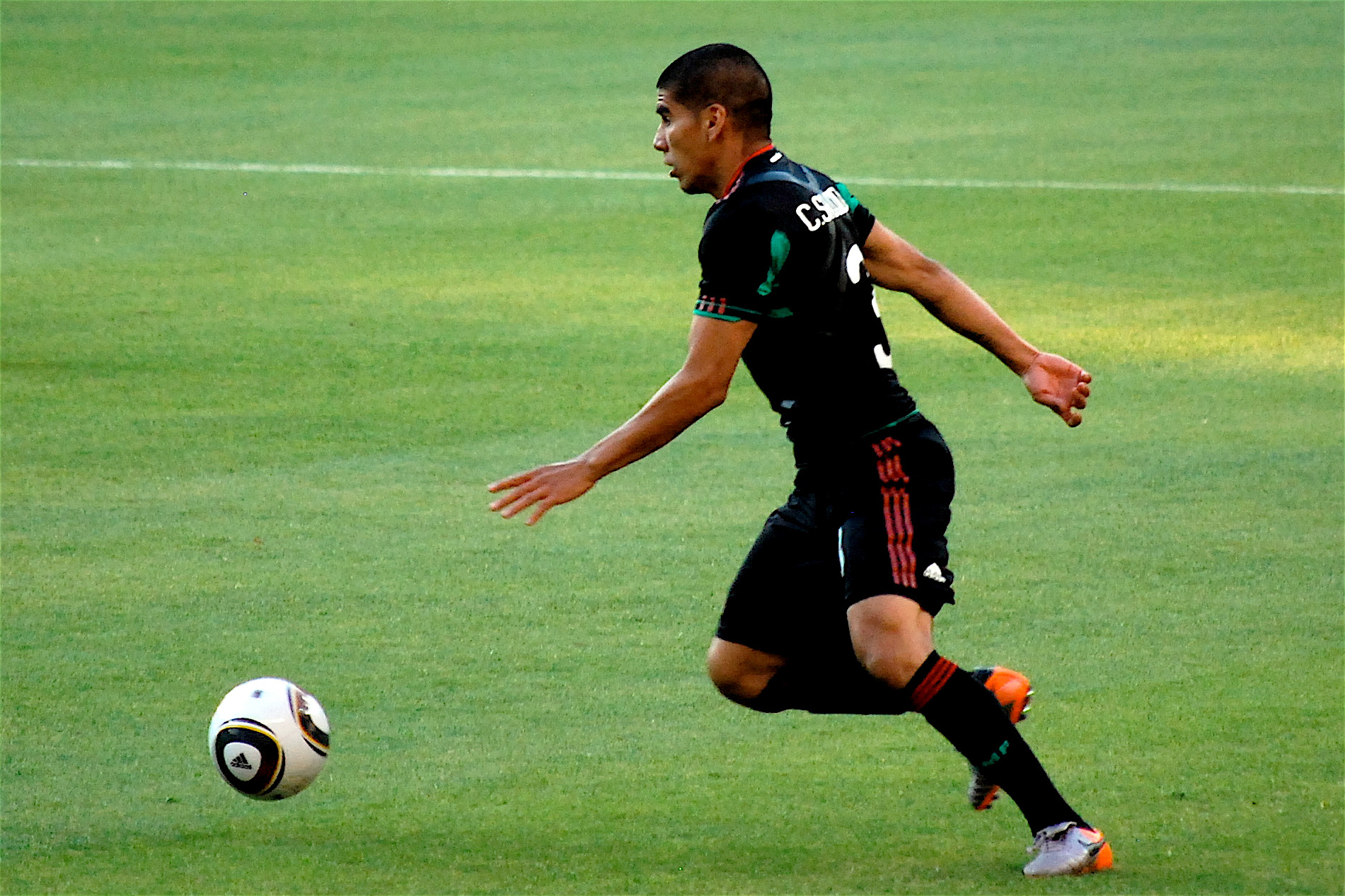
Salcido playing for Mexico at the 2010 FIFA World Cup.

Salcido debuted with Mexico 8 September 2004 in a 2006 world cup qualifying match against Trinidad and Tobago, he soon established himself with the number 3 shirt as the national sides first choice left back. He has gone on to appear in several international competitions with Mexico. In 2005, he played in the Confederations Cup in Germany, helping the national team to a fourth-place finish, where he appeared as a starter in all five matches. During a semi-final match against Argentina, Salcido scored a goal in extra time. He recovered the ball in the Mexican area, dribbled it past three defenders while going the entire length of the pitch, then scored after the shot fooled keeper Germán Lux when it bounced off Fabricio Coloccini.

Salcido was included in the 24-man squad selected on 2 April 2006, by head coach Ricardo Lavolpe, to play for the national team in the 2006 FIFA World Cup. Salcido played all four matches during the 2006 FIFA World Cup in Germany.

Salcido was called up by former Mexico national footballer now manager Hugo Sánchez for the 2007 Gold Cup. He announced that he would not participate in the 2007 Copa America with the team because he needed rest. He played in the final of the Gold Cup, where Mexico finished runner-up against rivals the United States. He was included in the tournament's All-Tournament Team.

Salcido played all four games at the 2010 World Cup in South Africa.

Salcido was one of the three over age players selected for the 2012 Summer Olympics. He won the gold medal with the Olympic team.

Salcido's inclusion into Mexico's 2014 FIFA World Cup roster was a surprise to the player and to analysts alike. He made his only start during the knockout stage against the Netherlands replacing the suspended José Juan Vázquez.

Salcido announced his retirement from international football on 29 August 2014.

== Post-playing career ==
In October 2017, the creation of the Asociación Mexicana de Futbolistas (Mexican Footballers Association) was announced, with Salcido serving as co-president alongside Oribe Peralta.

In May 2020, he was named as the first president of the Liga de Balompié Mexicano. Following various issues that plagued the first season, he resigned in January 2021. A month following his departure, he presented a project for a new football league, named Liga Top.

In July 2024, he began his career as a manager when he was named the new coach of Halcones F.C., a team that plays in the third tier of Mexican football. Salcido parted ways with Halcones in November.

== Career statistics ==
=== Club ===
As of 29 August 2014

Appearances and goals by club, season and competition
Club	Season	League			National cup (Note: Includes KNVB Cup, FA Cup, Copa MX.)		League cup (Note: Includes League Cup.)		Continental		Total	
Club	Season	Division	Apps	Goals	Apps	Goals	Apps	Goals	Apps	Goals	Apps	Goals
Guadalajara	2001–02	Mexican Primera División	1	0	–		–		–		1	0
Guadalajara	2002–03	Mexican Primera División	–		–		–		–		0	0
Guadalajara	2003–04	Mexican Primera División	42	1	–		–		–		42	1
Guadalajara	2004–05	Mexican Primera División	33	1	–		–		–		33	1
Guadalajara	2005–06	Mexican Primera División	29	0	–		–		4 (Note: Includes 2006 Copa Libertadores)	0	33	0
Guadalajara	Total		105	2	0	0	0	0	4	0	109	2
PSV Eindhoven	2006–07	Eredivisie	33	1	4	0	–		9	0	46	1
PSV Eindhoven	2007–08	Eredivisie	33	0	1	0	–		12	0	46	0
PSV Eindhoven	2008–09	Eredivisie	28	2	2	0	–		6	0	36	2
PSV Eindhoven	2009–10	Eredivisie	27	0	2	0	–		9	0	38	0
PSV Eindhoven	2010–11 (Note: Salcido was an unused substitute in four Eredivisie and two 2010–11 UEFA Europa League matches.)	Eredivisie	–		–		–		–		0	0
PSV Eindhoven	Total		121	3	9	0	0	0	36	0	166	3
Fulham	2010–11	Premier League	23	0	2	0	1	0	–	–	26	0
Tigres UANL	2011–12	Liga MX	37	1	–		–		–		37	1
Tigres UANL	2012–13	Liga MX	30	2	–		–		–		30	2
Tigres UANL	2013–14	Liga MX	32	2	6	1	–		–		38	3
Tigres UANL	Total		99	5	6	1	0	0	0	0	105	6
Guadalajara	2014–15	Liga MX	31	0	–		–		–		31	0
Career total			369	10	17	1	1	0	40	0	427	11

=== International ===
As of match played 29 June 2014

Appearances and goals by national team and year
National team	Year	Apps	Goals
Mexico	2004	5	0
Mexico	2005	22	2
Mexico	2006	9	0
Mexico	2007	13	1
Mexico	2008	11	2
Mexico	2009	8	1
Mexico	2010	13	0
Mexico	2011	15	1
Mexico	2012	9	3
Mexico	2013	14	0
Mexico	2014	4	0
Total		123	10

Scores and results list Mexico's goal tally first, score column indicates score after each Salcido goal.

List of international goals scored by Carlos Salcido
No.	Date	Venue	Opponent	Score	Result	Competition
1	26 June 2005	AWD-Arena, Hanover, Germany	Argentina	1–0	1–1 (p.s.o.)	2005 FIFA Confederations Cup
2	26 October 2005	Estadio Jalisco, Guadalajara, Mexico	Uruguay	1–0	3–1	Friendly
3	13 June 2007	Reliant Stadium, Houston, United States	Panama	1–0	1–0	2007 CONCACAF Gold Cup
4	26 March 2008	Craven Cottage, London, England	Ghana	1–1	2–1	Friendly
5	15 October 2008	Commonwealth Stadium, Edmonton, Canada	Canada	1–1	2–2	2010 FIFA World Cup qualification
6	14 October 2009	Hasely Crawford Stadium, Port of Spain, Trinidad & Tobago	Trinidad & Tobago	2–2	2–2	2010 FIFA World Cup qualification
7	11 November 2011	Estadio Corregidora, Querétaro, Mexico	Serbia	1–0	2–0	Friendly
8	25 January 2012	Reliant Stadium, Houston, United States	Venezuela	1–1	3–1	Friendly
9	8 June 2012	Estadio Azteca, Mexico City, Mexico	Guyana	1–0	3–1	2014 FIFA World Cup qualification
10	7 September 2012	Estadio Nacional de Costa Rica, San José, Costa Rica	Costa Rica	1–0	2–0	2014 FIFA World Cup qualification

== Honours ==
PSV

- Eredivisie: 2006–07, 2007–08
- Johan Cruyff Shield: 2008

Tigres UANL

- Mexican Primera División: Apertura 2011
- Copa MX: Clausura 2014

Guadalajara

- Liga MX: Clausura 2017
- Copa MX: Apertura 2015, Clausura 2017
- Supercopa MX: 2016
- CONCACAF Champions League: 2018

Mexico Olympic

- Olympic Gold Medal: 2012

Mexico

- CONCACAF Gold Cup: 2011

Individual

- Mexican Primera División Best Full-back: 2004–05
- CONCACAF Gold Cup All-Tournament Team: 2007

== See also ==
- List of men's footballers with 100 or more international caps
