= Alofoke FM =

Radio station in Santo Domingo, Dominican Republic

- Santo Domingo; Dominican Republic
- Frequency: 99.3 MHz (HD Radio)

Programming
- Language: Spanish
- Format: urban contemporary

Ownership
- Owner: Santiago Matías, Ozuna; (Odani Entertainment, S.R.L.)

History
- First air date: 1987
- Former names: Sonido Suave (1987–2021)

Technical information
- Class: B
- ERP: 10,000 watts

Links
- Website: www.alofoke.fm

Alofoke FM is a Dominican radio station located in Santo Domingo. It transmits on 99.3 MHz from the Alofoke Music Group building. It airs an urban contemporary and tropical rhythms and is owned by Santiago Matías and Ozuna and operated by Santiago's media company Alofoke Music Group. Its studios and offices are located at the Alofoke Music building at Calle Virgilio Díaz Ordóñez #52 in Santo Domingo.

== History ==
=== Early years ===
The station first signed on as HIPJ on October 24, 1987, and started with an effective radiated power of 10,000 watts, the studios were located at Av. 27 de Febrero and was founded by the Dominican radio host and producer José Lluberes and branded as Sonido Suave. It began as a Spanish-language bolero and ballad station serving what is now Distrito Nacional, later adding more soft adult contemporary, English-language music for younger listeners and a news segment, as well as expanding its reach to the Greater Santo Domingo area.

On October 4, 2021, Sonido Suave was rebranded as Alofoke FM after it was bought by Santiago Matías and Ozuna during the same year, changing its format to urban contemporary.
