= José Juan Vázquez =

Mexican footballer (born 1988)

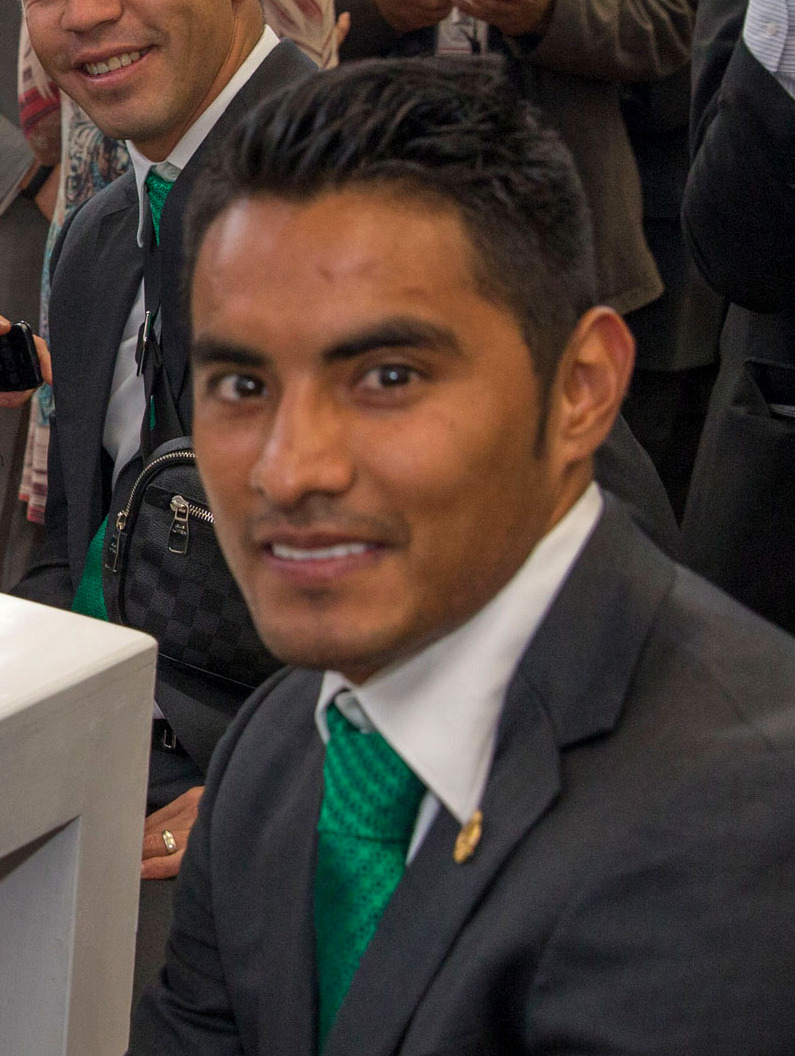
- Vázquez in 2014

Personal information
- Full name: José Juan Vázquez Gómez
- Date of birth: 14 March 1988 (age 38)
- Place of birth: Celaya, Guanajuato, Mexico
- Height: 1.66 m (5 ft 5 in)
- Position: Defensive midfielder

Senior career*
Years	Team	Apps	(Gls)
2007–2008	Atlético Comonfort		
2008	Atlético San Francisco		
2008–2009	Cuervos Negros de Zapotlanejo		
2009–2012	Celaya	53	(4)
2012–2016	León	164	(9)
2016–2017	Guadalajara	44	(1)
2018–2019	Santos Laguna	69	(1)
2020–2021	Guadalajara	14	(0)
2021	Toluca	38	(0)
2022–2023	Tijuana	42	(0)
2023–2024	Cancún	36	(1)
2024	Celaya	20	(0)
2025	Aucas	6	(0)
2025	Gullit Academy	1	(0)
2025	La Bombonera		
Total		486	(16)

International career
2014–2019	Mexico	19	(0)
Medal record
Representing Mexico
Winner	2015 CONCACAF Gold Cup	2015
- * Club domestic league appearances and goals as of 28 March 2025

José Juan Vázquez Gómez (Spanish pronunciation: [xoˈse ˈxwam ˈbaskes]; born 14 March 1988), also known as Gallito, is a former Mexican professional footballer who played as a defensive midfielder.

== Club career ==
=== Celaya ===
José Juan Vázquez began playing football professionally at the age of 19 in the fourth and third divisions of Mexico with teams such as Atlético San Francisco and Atlético Comonfort in the fourth division, and for Cuervos Negros de Zapotlanejo, América Manzanillo, and finally his home town team Celaya in the third division.

During his stay with Celaya, he was a part of the squad that achieved promotion to the Liga de Ascenso (Second Division) for the Clausura 2011 tournament. Vázquez made his second division debut with Celaya on 29 July 2011 against Leones Negros in which he played the entire 90 minutes of the game and subsequently became an undisputed starter for the rest of the season. Vázquez eventually was loaned to Club León for the Clausura 2012 tournament, one season after accomplishing promotion with Celaya.

=== León ===
Vázquez arrived at León on 12 December 2011 on loan while the team was still playing the Liga de Ascenso. In his first season, he started in every match, being substituted only once. During the Clausura tournament, León won the league final, giving them the right to play the Promotional final against Correcaminos, which they won by an aggregate score of 6–2, and earning promotion to the first division. Vázquez was eventually bought by León in May 2012.

On 15 December 2013, León defeated América in the Apertura final at the Estadio Azteca to win their first title since their promotion and the sixth overall in the club's history. In the following tournament, Vázquez played a vital role in Leon's back-to-back championship win after defeating Pachuca in the final on 14 May 2014, playing all 90' minutes of the final at the Estadio Hidalgo.

=== Guadalajara ===
In the Clausura 2017 championship finals, he scored Guadalajara's second goal in the second leg, contributing to an aggregate score of 4–3 and helping Chivas win their twelfth league title.

=== Santos ===
On 18 November 2017, it was confirmed that Vázquez was to join Santos Laguna.

=== Return to Guadalajara ===
On 9 December 2019, Váquez returned to Guadalajara.

On 5 November 2020, Vazquez was separated from the first team.

== International career ==
Vázquez received his first international call up to the senior national team on 23 January 2014, under coach Miguel Herrera for a friendly match against South Korea held in the United States in preparation for the 2014 FIFA World Cup. He started the match and played 55' minutes, being substituted out for Jesús Zavala. Mexico went on to win the match 4–0.

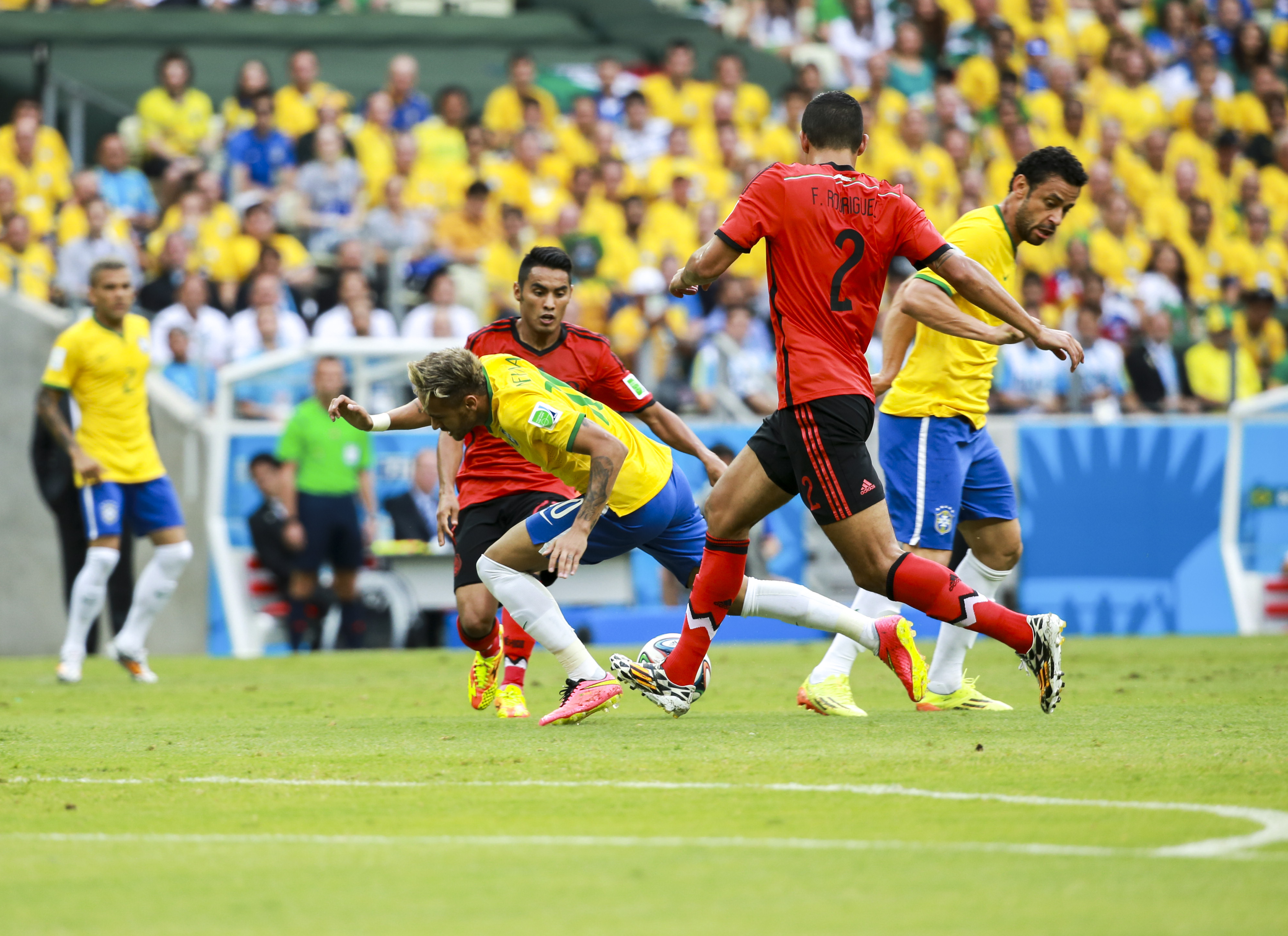
Vázquez (first Mexican player on the left) playing against Brazil at the 2014 FIFA World Cup.

After few participations with the national team Vázquez was included in Miguel Herrera's final 23-man list participating in the 2014 FIFA World Cup held in Brazil on 8 May. He made his World Cup debut on 13 June against Cameroon in the Arena das Dunas. Vázquez in total completed 61 passes and recovered three balls in his first match. He was a starter in Mexico's second match against host nation Brazil in which the match ultimately ended in a 0–0 draw. In total, Vázquez has a 95.2% completed pass rate in the World Cup tournament so far. Vázquez was a starter in Mexico's final group stage match against Croatia, in which he received a yellow card and missed the match against The Netherlands.

== Career statistics ==
=== International ===
As of 26 March 2019

Mexico
Year	Apps	Goals
2014	10	0
2015	8	0
2019	1	0
Total	19	0

== Honours ==
Celaya

- Liga Premier: 2010
- Campeón de Campeones: 2011

León

- Liga MX: Apertura 2013, Clausura 2014
- Ascenso MX: Clausura 2012
- Campeón de Ascenso: 2012
- Copa MX runner-up: Apertura 2015
- Copa Pachuca: 2012

Guadalajara

- Liga MX: Clausura 2017
- Copa MX: Clausura 2017
- Campeón de Campeones runner-up: 2017
- Supercopa MX: 2016

Santos Laguna

- Liga MX: Clausura 2018
- Campeón de Campeones runner-up: 2018

Cancún

- Liga de Expansión MX: Apertura 2023
- Campeón de Campeones: 2024

Gullit Academy

- UPSL Division 1: 2025

Mexico

- CONCACAF Gold Cup: 2015
- CONCACAF Cup: 2015

Individual

- Liga MX Best Defensive Midfielder: 2016–17
- Liga MX Best XI: Clausura 2018
