= 2016–17 Liga MX season =

70th professional season of the top-flight football league in Mexico

Liga MX
- Season: 2016–17
- Champions: Apertura: Tigres UANL (5th title); Clausura: Guadalajara (12th title)
- Relegated: Chiapas
- Champions League: Tigres UANL; Guadalajara; América; Tijuana
- Matches: 306
- Goals: 806 (2.63 per match); Apertura: 431 (2.82 per match); Clausura: 375 (2.45 per match)
- Top goalscorer: Apertura: Dayro Moreno; Raúl Ruidíaz (11 goals); Clausura: Raúl Ruidíaz (9 goals)
- Biggest home win: Apertura: Pachuca 5–1 León (July 16, 2016); Tijuana 4–0 Guadalajara (July 29, 2016); Clausura: Tijuana 6–2 Puebla (January 13, 2017); León 4–0 Veracruz (April 8, 2017); Tigres UANL 4–0 UNAM (April 15, 2017); Morelia 4–0 UNAM (April 29, 2017)
- Biggest away win: Apertura: Morelia 1–5 Pachuca (September 20, 2016); Clausura: Querétaro 1–5 Tigres UANL (May 6, 2017)
- Highest scoring: Apertura: UNAM 5–3 Monterrey (August 21, 2016); Cruz Azul 5–3 Veracruz (October 1, 2016); Clausura: Tijuana 6–2 Puebla (January 13, 2017)
- Longest winning run: Apertura: 3 Guadalajara; León; Necaxa; Pachuca; Tijuana; Toluca; Tigres UANL; Clausura: 4 Tijuana
- Longest unbeaten run: Apertura: 11; Tigres UANL; Clausura: 8 Santos Laguna (twice)
- Longest winless run: Apertura: 13; Chiapas; Clausura: 8 Chiapas; León
- Longest losing run: Apertura: 8 Veracruz; Clausura: 5 Veracruz
- Highest attendance: Apertura: 61,561; América 0–3 Guadalajara (August 27, 2016); Clausura: 53,219; Atlas 1–2 Guadalajara (February 11, 2017)
- Lowest attendance: Apertura: 8,672; Chiapas 1–2 Querétaro (October 29, 2016); Clausura: 0 Veracruz 3–1 Cruz Azul (March 31, 2017)
- Total attendance: Apertura: 4,069,808; Clausura: 4,249,473
- Average attendance: Apertura: 26,600; Clausura: 27,774
- Stats are from the regular season only Source: ESPN FC

The 2016–17 Liga MX season (known as the Liga BBVA Bancomer MX for sponsorship reasons) was the 70th professional season of the top-flight football league in Mexico. The season is split into two championships—the Torneo Apertura and the Torneo Clausura—each in an identical format and each contested by the same eighteen teams. The fixtures were announced on 9 June 2016.

== Clubs ==
The following eighteen teams are competing this season. Sinaloa was relegated to the Ascenso MX after accumulating the lowest coefficient last season. Sinaloa will be replaced by the 2016 Clausura Ascenso MX champion Necaxa, who won promotion after defeating the Apertura 2015 winner Juárez in a promotion play-off.

=== Stadiums and locations ===
América	Atlas	Chiapas	Cruz Azul	Guadalajara	León
Estadio Azteca	Estadio Jalisco	Estadio Víctor Manuel Reyna	Estadio Azul	Estadio Chivas	Estadio León
Capacity: 87,000	Capacity: 53,985	Capacity: 29,001	Capacity: 33,000	Capacity: 45,364	Capacity: 31,297
	Barra 51				
Monterrey	Morelia	Necaxa	Pachuca	Puebla	Querétaro
Estadio BBVA Bancomer	Estadio Morelos	Estadio Victoria	Estadio Hidalgo	Estadio Cuauhtémoc	Estadio Corregidora
Capacity: 52,237	Capacity: 34,984	Capacity: 23,898	Capacity: 27,512	Capacity: 51,726	Capacity: 33,162
Santos Laguna	Tijuana	Toluca	Tigres UANL	UNAM	Veracruz
Estadio Corona	Estadio Caliente	Estadio Nemesio Díez	Estadio Universitario	Estadio Olímpico Universitario	Estadio Luis "Pirata" Fuente
Capacity: 29,237	Capacity: 27,333	Capacity: 25,257	Capacity: 41,615	Capacity: 48,297	Capacity: 28,703

=== Stadium changes ===
Toluca (Apertura 2016 and Week 1 of Clausura 2017)
Estadio Universitario Alberto "Chivo" Córdoba
Capacity: 32,603

Locations of clubs for the 2016–17 Liga MX season

=== Personnel and kits ===
Team	Chairman	Head coach	Captain	Kit manufacturer	Shirt sponsor(s)
América	Ricardo Peláez	(Argentina) Ricardo La Volpe	(Mexico) Oribe Peralta	Nike	Huawei
Atlas	Gustavo Guzmán	(Mexico) José Guadalupe Cruz	(Mexico) Rafael Márquez	Puma	Wibe
Chiapas	Carlos López Chargoy	(Mexico) Sergio Bueno	(Mexico) Félix Araujo	Charly	Compartamos Banco
Cruz Azul	Guillermo Álvarez Cuevas	(Spain) Paco Jémez	(Mexico) José de Jesús Corona	Under Armour	Cemento Cruz Azul
Guadalajara	Jorge Vergara	(Argentina) Matías Almeyda	(Mexico) Carlos Salcido	Puma	None
León	Jesús Martínez Murguia	(Argentina) Javier Torrente	(Argentina) Mauro Boselli	Pirma	B Hermanos
Monterrey	Duilio Davino	(Argentina) Antonio Mohamed	(Argentina) José María Basanta	Puma	Hagámoslo Bien
Morelia	Álvaro Dávila	(Mexico) Roberto Hernández (Interim)	(Mexico) Juan Pablo Rodríguez	Pirma	Caliente
Necaxa	Ernesto Tinajero	(Mexico) Alfonso Sosa	(Chile) Marcos González	Umbro	Cavall 7
Pachuca	Jesús Martínez Patiño	(Uruguay) Diego Alonso	(Mexico) Erick Gutiérrez	Nike	Cementos Fortaleza
Puebla	Carlos López Domínguez	(Paraguay) José Cardozo	(Mexico) Óscar Rojas	Charly	Caliente
Querétaro	Joaquín Beltrán	(Mexico) Jaime Lozano	(Argentina) Miguel Martínez	Puma	Banco Multiva
Santos Laguna	Alejandro Irarragorri	(Mexico) José Manuel de la Torre	(Argentina) Carlos Izquierdoz	Puma	Soriana
Tijuana	Jorge Hank Inzunsa	(Mexico) Miguel Herrera	(Mexico) Juan Carlos Núñez	Adidas	Caliente
Toluca	Valentín Díez Morodo	(Argentina) Hernán Cristante	(Paraguay) Paulo da Silva	Under Armour	Banamex
UANL	Alejandro Rodríguez Michelsen	(Brazil) Ricardo Ferretti	(Brazil) Juninho	Adidas	Cemex
UNAM	Rodrigo Ares de Parga	(Mexico) Francisco Palencia	(Paraguay) Darío Verón	Nike	DHL
Veracruz	Fidel Kuri Mustieles	(Mexico) Juan Antonio Luna	(Mexico) Leobardo López	Charly	Electrolit

=== Managerial changes ===
Team	Outgoing manager	Manner of departure	Date of vacancy	Replaced by	Date of appointment	Position in table
Pre-Apertura changes
UNAM	(Mexico) Guillermo Vázquez	Sacked	May 26, 2016	(Mexico) Juan Francisco Palencia	May 30, 2015	Preseason
Apertura changes
Santos Laguna	(Argentina) Luis Zubeldía	Sacked	August 15, 2016	(Mexico) José Manuel de la Torre	August 15, 2016	17th
León	(Mexico) Luis Fernando Tena	Sacked	August 29, 2016	(Argentina) Javier Torrente	August 30, 2016	18th
América	(Mexico) Ignacio Ambriz	Sacked	September 18, 2016	(Mexico) Israel Hernández and (Mexico) Raúl Lara (Interim)	September 18, 2016	7th
Chiapas	(Paraguay) José Cardozo	Sacked	September 12, 2016	(Mexico) Sergio Bueno	September 18, 2016	18th
América	(Mexico) Israel Hernández and (Mexico) Raúl Lara (Interim)	End of tenure as caretakers	September 22, 2016	(Argentina) Ricardo La Volpe	September 22, 2016	6th
Veracruz	(Argentina) Pablo Marini	Resigned	September 23, 2016	(Mexico) Juan Antonio Luna (Interim)	September 24, 2016	16th
Veracruz	(Mexico) Juan Antonio Luna (Interim)	End of tenure as caretaker	October 5, 2016	(Chile) Carlos Reinoso	October 5, 2016	16th
Cruz Azul	(Mexico) Tomás Boy	Mutual agreement	October 22, 2016	(Mexico) Joaquín Moreno (Interim)	October 22, 2016	13th
Morelia	(Mexico) Enrique Meza	Sacked	October 23, 2016	(Mexico) Roberto Hernández (Interim)	October 23, 2016	14th
Pre-Clausura changes
Morelia	(Mexico) Roberto Hernández (Interim)	End of tenure as caretaker	November 30, 2016	(Argentina) Pablo Marini	November 30, 2016	Preseason
Cruz Azul	(Mexico) Joaquín Moreno (Interim)	End of tenure as caretaker	November 28, 2016	(Spain) Paco Jémez	November 28, 2016	Preseason
Clausura changes
Puebla	(Argentina) Ricardo Valiño	Sacked	January 30, 2017	(Paraguay) José Cardozo	January 30, 2017	18th
Querétaro	(Mexico) Víctor Manuel Vucetich	Sacked	January 31, 2017	(Mexico) Jaime Lozano	February 1, 2017	17th
Morelia	(Argentina) Pablo Marini	Mutual agreement	February 6, 2017	(Mexico) Roberto Hernández (Interim)	February 6, 2017	13th
Veracruz	(Chile) Carlos Reinoso	Resigned	March 23, 2017	(Mexico) Juan Antonio Luna	March 23, 2017	17th

== Torneo Apertura ==
The Apertura 2016 is the first championship of the season. The regular season began on July 15, 2016 and ended on December 25, 2016. Pachuca are the defending champions, having won their 6th title.

=== Regular phase ===
==== League table ====
Pos	Team	Pld	W	D	L	GF	GA	GD	Pts	Qualification
1	Tijuana	17	10	3	4	25	13	+12	33	Advanced to Liguilla (Note: The first 8 places in the table qualify for the Playoffs.)
2	Pachuca	17	9	4	4	36	21	+15	31	Advanced to Liguilla
3	Tigres UANL	0	0	0	0	0	0	0	0	Advanced to Liguilla
4	Guadalajara	17	8	4	5	21	17	+4	28	Advanced to Liguilla
5	América	17	7	7	3	29	26	+3	28	Advanced to Liguilla
6	UNAM	17	8	3	6	28	22	+6	27	Advanced to Liguilla
7	Necaxa	17	6	8	3	24	18	+6	26	Advanced to Liguilla
8	León	17	7	5	5	25	25	0	26	Advanced to Liguilla
9	Monterrey	17	6	7	4	30	21	+9	25	
10	Toluca	17	6	6	5	22	21	+1	24	
11	Querétaro	17	5	5	7	20	24	−4	20	
12	Puebla	17	5	5	7	25	30	−5	20	
13	Morelia	17	5	5	7	28	34	−6	20	
14	Cruz Azul	17	4	7	6	25	23	+2	19	
15	Atlas	17	4	7	6	21	25	−4	19	
16	Santos Laguna	17	4	4	9	19	30	−11	16	
17	Veracruz	17	3	3	11	22	38	−16	12	
18	Chiapas	17	2	3	12	9	30	−21	9	Team last in relegation table at end of Apertura season

Updated to match(es) played on 20 November 2016. Source: LigaMX.net
Rules for classification: 1) Points; 2) Goal difference; 3) Number of goals scored; 4) Head-to-head results between tied teams; 5) Number of goals scored away; 6) Highest relegation coefficient; 7) Fair Play points

==== Positions by round ====
The table lists the positions of teams after each week of matches. In order to preserve chronological evolvements, any postponed matches are not included in the round at which they were originally scheduled, but added to the full round they were played immediately afterwards. For example, if a match is scheduled for matchday 13, but then postponed and played between days 16 and 17, it will be added to the standings for day 16.

Team ╲ Round	1	2	3	4	5	6	7	8	9	10	11	12	13	14	15	16	17
Tijuana	4	6	4	1	1	1	1	1	2	2	1	1	1	1	1	1	1
Pachuca	1	1	1	2	2	2	2	6	4	3	3	3	2	2	2	2	2
Tigres UANL	11	11	6	4	4	3	3	2	1	1	2	2	3	3	3	3	3
Guadalajara	14	8	13	12	10	10	7	4	6	8	7	5	4	4	4	4	4
América	2	2	5	3	3	4	5	5	7	6	4	6	5	5	5	5	5
UNAM	5	5	3	6	9	6	6	3	5	4	6	4	6	9	6	7	6
Necaxa	13	12	15	14	16	15	14	10	11	11	12	8	8	6	7	6	7
León	18	17	18	18	18	17	18	16	14	15	15	12	9	8	8	9	8
Monterrey	8	13	14	8	6	9	10	8	13	9	11	13	10	11	11	10	9
Toluca	7	14	16	11	12	13	13	9	8	5	5	7	7	7	9	8	10
Querétaro	3	3	2	5	5	7	11	13	9	12	14	15	15	15	14	15	11
Puebla	6	4	9	9	11	12	9	12	15	10	8	9	13	10	10	11	12
Morelia	17	15	8	7	7	5	4	7	3	7	9	11	14	14	12	12	13
Cruz Azul	10	10	10	13	13	11	12	15	10	13	13	10	12	13	15	13	14
Atlas	9	9	7	10	8	8	8	11	12	14	10	14	11	12	13	14	15
Santos Laguna	12	16	17	17	17	18	16	17	17	17	17	17	17	16	16	16	16
Veracruz	16	7	11	15	14	14	15	14	16	16	16	16	16	17	17	17	17
Chiapas	15	18	12	16	15	16	17	18	18	18	18	18	18	18	18	18	18

Leader and qualification to playoffs
Qualification to playoffs
Last place in table

Source: Liga MX

=== Results ===
Home \ Away	AMÉ	ATL	CHI	CAZ	GUA	LEÓ	MON	MOR	NEC	PAC	PUE	QUE	SLA	TIJ	TOL	UNL	UNM	VER
América			2–0		0–3	0–2		1–1					3–1	1–0	3–1	0–3	2–1	
Atlas	1–1			1–1			3–1		0–0		3–2	2–1			1–1			1–0
Chiapas		1–0		0–3			1–4		2–2	0–2	0–3	1–2			1–0			1–1
Cruz Azul	3–4					2–3				2–1	1–2		3–1	1–2	0–1		0–0	4–2
Guadalajara		2–2	2–0	3–2			1–0	2–1		1–2		0–0				0–1		
León		4–1	0–0		1–1		0–3	3–1	0–0			2–1				3–2		
Monterrey	1–1			1–1					2–1		1–1		5–2	0–0	1–1			4–0
Morelia		3–2	3–2	1–1			1–2		2–1	1–5	2–3	2–2				0–2		
Necaxa	1–1			0–0							3–1		2–1	1–1	3–1		2–2	3–2
Pachuca	3–3	3–2				5–1	1–1		1–0			2–0	3–0	2–2			3–0	
Puebla	2–2				0–2	2–2				1–1			0–0	3–2	0–2		0–3	3–2
Querétaro	1–1			0–0			1–0		1–2		2–1		1–1		2–3			2–0
Santos Laguna		2–2	2–0		0–1			2–4						1–2		0–0	3–1	
Tijuana		1–0	2–0		4–0	2–0		2–0				2–1				0–1	1–0	
Toluca					2–1	1–1		2–2		2–0			1–2	0–1		0–0	2–1	
Tigres UANL		0–0	1–0	0–0			1–1		0–2	4–2	2–1	1–2						1–1
UNAM		2–0	1–0		1–0	1–0	5–3	1–1				4–1				1–3		
Veracruz	2–4				0–1	2–3		1–3		1–0			2–0	2–1	2–2		1–4	

Updated to match(es) played on 19 November 2016. Source: Liga MX
Legend: Blue = home team win; Yellow = draw; Red = away team win.

=== Top goalscorers ===
Players sorted first by goals scored, then by last name.

Rank	Player	Club	Goals
1	(Colombia) Dayro Moreno	Tijuana	11
1	(Peru) Raúl Ruidíaz	Morelia	11
3	(Argentina) Mauro Boselli	León	10
3	(Argentina) Rogelio Funes Mori	Monterrey	10
3	(Argentina) Silvio Romero	América	10
6	(Chile) Edson Puch	Necaxa	9
6	(Argentina) Franco Jara	Pachuca	9
8	(Argentina) Matías Alustiza	Puebla	8
9	(Mexico) Hirving Lozano	Pachuca	7
9	(Brazil) Camilo Sanvezzo	Querétaro	7
9	(Argentina) Ismael Sosa	Tigres UANL	7
9	(Colombia) Fernando Uribe	Toluca	7

Source: ESPN FC

==== Hat-tricks ====
Player	For	Against	Result	Date
(Mexico) Oribe Peralta	América	Toluca	3–1	23 July 2016
(Peru) Raúl Ruidíaz	Morelia	Santos Laguna	4–2	31 July 2016
(Argentina) Rogelio Funes Mori	Monterrey	León	3–0	6 August 2016
(Uruguay) Matías Britos	UNAM	Monterrey	5–3	21 August 2016
(Uruguay) Álvaro Navarro	Puebla	Morelia	3–2	24 September 2016

==== Clean sheets ====
Rank	Player	Club	Clean sheets	Avg.
1	(Argentina) Nahuel Guzmán	Tigres UANL	9	0.77
2	(Argentina) Federico Vilar	Tijuana	8	0.77
3	(Mexico) Rodolfo Cota	Guadalajara	7	1.00
4	(Mexico) Alejandro Palacios	UNAM	6	1.29
5	(Mexico) Óscar Pérez	Pachuca	5	1.25
5	(Mexico) José de Jesús Corona	Cruz Azul	5	1.35
7	(Argentina) Marcelo Barovero	Necaxa	4	1.00
7	(Brazil) Tiago Volpi	Querétaro	4	1.41
9	(Argentina) Óscar Ustari	Atlas	3	1.33
9	(United States) William Yarbrough	León	3	1.47
9	(Argentina) Agustín Marchesín	Santos Laguna	3	1.73

Source: Fox Soccer

==== Saves ====
Rank	Player	Club	Saves
1	(Mexico) Carlos Felipe Rodríguez	Morelia	69
2	(Argentina) Cristian Campestrini	Puebla	68
3	(Peru) Pedro Gallese	Veracruz	65
4	(Argentina) Marcelo Barovero	Necaxa	62
5	(Mexico) José de Jesús Corona	Cruz Azul	56
5	(Mexico) Alejandro Palacios	UNAM	56
5	(United States) William Yarbrough	León	56
8	(Argentina) Federico Vilar	Tijuana	55
9	(Argentina) Óscar Ustari	Atlas	52
10	(Brazil) Tiago Volpi	Querétaro	50

Source: Fox Soccer

=== Attendance ===
==== Per team ====
Pos	Team	Total	High	Low	Average	Change
1	Monterrey	387,139	51,468	40,966	48,392	−3.0%
2	Tigres UANL	372,850	41,563	41,203	41,428	+0.1%
3	América	352,734	61,561	23,656	39,193	−3.9%
4	Atlas	273,047	42,686	24,127	34,131	−1.7%
5	Guadalajara	300,701	38,810	27,004	33,411	−13.2%
6	Tijuana	215,864	27,333	26,333	26,983	−0.2%
7	UNAM	207,168	44,505	15,000	25,896	+7.6%
8	Pachuca	220,730	25,922	21,371	24,526	−0.6%
9	León	184,948	27,308	16,978	23,119	+21.7%
10	Puebla	207,330	35,285	11,089	23,037	−35.1%
11	Querétaro	183,403	31,162	18,176	22,925	−11.9%
12	Morelia	205,766	27,812	19,707	22,863	+2.2%
13	Chiapas	183,034	27,858	8,672	20,337	+20.2%
14	Santos Laguna	162,071	25,297	19,472	20,259	−13.7%
15	Toluca	152,726	25,582	13,070	19,091	+14.7%
16	Veracruz	169,760	27,532	15,199	18,862	−11.1%
17	Necaxa	138,185	22,511	12,433	17,273	+162.1%
18	Cruz Azul	152,352	28,036	9,767	16,928	−22.7%
	League total	4,069,808	61,561	8,672	26,600	−4.2%

Updated to games played on 20 November 2016
Source: Wk1 WK2 WK3 WK4 WK5 WK6 WK7 WK8 WK9 WK10 WK12 WK13 WK14 WK15 WK16 WK17
Notes:
Only regular season listed

==== Highest and lowest ====
Highest attendance					Lowest attendance			
Week	Home	Score	Away	Attendance	Home	Score	Away	Attendance
1	Monterrey	1–1	Puebla	48,071	Necaxa	0–0	Cruz Azul	21,525
2	UANL	0–0	Atlas	41,203	Puebla	3–2	Tijuana	14,137
3	Monterrey	1–1	Cruz Azul	50,093	Querétaro	2–1	Puebla	20,349
4	UANL	1–0	Chiapas	41,397	Toluca	2–0	Pachuca	10,000
5	Monterrey	2–1	Necaxa	49,892	Toluca	0–0	UANL	10,000
6	UANL	4–2	Pachuca	41,469	Cruz Azul	3–1	Santos Laguna	11,890
7	América	0–3	Guadalajara	61,561	Toluca	2–2	Morelia	17,140
8	Monterrey	0–0	Tijuana	50,045	Puebla	0–2	Toluca	12,782
9	América	0–2	León	42,981	Veracruz	1–3	Morelia	16,321
10	Monterrey	5–2	Santos Laguna	48,430	UNAM	2–0	Atlas	15,000
11	América	2–1	UNAM	49,156	Chiapas	2–2	Necaxa	17,252
12	Monterrey	1–1	América	50,302	Cruz Azul	5–3	Veracruz	11,788
13	América	1–0	Tijuana	49,640	Veracruz	2–3	León	14,547
14	Monterrey	1–1	Toluca	40,966	Cruz Azul	1–2	Puebla	9,767
15	UANL	1–1	Monterrey	41,537	Chiapas	1–2	Querétaro	8,672
16	Monterrey	4–0	Veracruz	48,114	Necaxa	3–1	Puebla	12,980
17	UANL	1–2	Querétaro	41,315	Cruz Azul	2–3	León	10,573

Source: Liga MX website

=== Final phase ===
==== Bracket ====
Quarterfinals
3	UANL	2	5	7
6	UNAM	2	0	2
1	Tijuana	0	3	3
8	León	3	2	5
4	Guadalajara	1	0	1
5	América	1	1	2
2	Pachuca	1	0	1
7	Necaxa	2	0	2

Semifinals
3	UANL	1	2	3
8	León	0	1	1
5	América	1	2	3
7	Necaxa	1	0	1

Finals
3	UANL (p)	1	1	2 (3)
5	América	1	1	2 (0)

- Teams are re-seeded each round.
- Team with more goals on aggregate after two matches advances.
- Away goals rule is applied in the quarterfinals and semifinals, but not the final.
- In the quarterfinals and semifinals, if the two teams are tied on aggregate and away goals, the higher seeded team advances.
- In the final, if the two teams are tied after both legs, the match goes to extra-time and, if necessary, a shootout.
- Both finalists qualify to the 2018 CONCACAF Champions League (in Pot 3).

==== Quarterfinals ====
Team 1	Agg.	Team 2	1st leg	2nd leg
León	5–3	Tijuana	3–0	2–3
UNAM	2–7	UANL	2–2	0–5
Necaxa	2–1	Pachuca	2–1	0–0
América	2–1	Guadalajara	1–1	1–0

==== Semifinals ====
Team 1	Agg.	Team 2	1st leg	2nd leg
León	1–3	UANL	0–1	1–2
Necaxa	1–3	América	1–1	0–2

==== Finals ====
Team 1	Agg.	Team 2	1st leg	2nd leg
América	2–2 (0–3 p)	UANL	1–1	1–1 (a.e.t.)

Champions

5th title

== Torneo Clausura ==
The Clausura 2017 is the second championship of the season. The regular phase of the tournament began on January 6, 2017.

Games scheduled for Round 10 were suspended due to a strike called by the Asociación Mexicana de Árbitros (Mexican Referee's Association).

=== Regular phase ===
==== League table ====
Pos	Team	Pld	W	D	L	GF	GA	GD	Pts	Qualification or relegation
1	Tijuana	17	9	4	4	30	22	+8	31	Advance to Liguilla (Note: The first 8 places in the table qualify for the Liguilla.)
2	Monterrey	17	7	6	4	26	18	+8	27	Advance to Liguilla
3	Guadalajara (C)	17	7	6	4	21	18	+3	27	Advance to Liguilla
4	Toluca	17	8	3	6	21	20	+1	27	Advance to Liguilla
5	Santos Laguna	17	5	11	1	25	20	+5	26	Advance to Liguilla
6	Atlas	17	7	5	5	24	21	+3	26	Advance to Liguilla
7	Tigres UANL	17	7	4	6	26	12	+14	25	Advance to Liguilla
8	Morelia	17	6	6	5	19	16	+3	24	Advance to Liguilla
9	América	17	7	3	7	19	19	0	24	
10	Pachuca	17	6	6	5	16	16	0	24	
11	Cruz Azul	17	5	6	6	19	20	−1	21	
12	Necaxa	17	5	6	6	16	21	−5	21	
13	Veracruz	17	7	0	10	14	21	−7	21	
14	León	17	5	5	7	21	23	−2	20	
15	Querétaro	17	5	4	8	21	27	−6	19	
16	Chiapas (R)	17	5	4	8	18	28	−10	19	Relegated to Ascenso MX
17	UNAM	17	5	3	9	21	30	−9	18	
18	Puebla	17	4	4	9	18	25	−7	16	

Updated to match(es) played on 28 May 2017. Source: Liga MX
Rules for classification: 1) Points; 2) Goal difference; 3) Number of goals scored; 4) Head-to-head results between tied teams; 5) Number of goals scored away; 6) Highest relegation coefficient; 7) Fair Play points
(C) Champions; (R) Relegated

==== Positions by round ====
The table lists the positions of teams after each week of matches. In order to preserve chronological evolvements, any postponed matches are not included in the round at which they were originally scheduled, but added to the full round they were played immediately afterwards. For example, if a match is scheduled for matchday 13, but then postponed and played between days 16 and 17, it will be added to the standings for day 16.

Matches scheduled for Round 10 were postponed due to a strike called by the Asociación Mexicana de Árbitros (Mexican Referee's Association). Round 10 matches which were scheduled to take place between March 10 and March 12 were rescheduled to take place between April 11 and April 13. (between Rounds 13 and 14)

Team ╲ Round	1	2	3	4	5	6	7	8	9	10	11	12	13	14	15	16	17
Tijuana	17	7	1	1	1	2	3	1	3	4	4	4	4	2	1	1	1
Monterrey	4	4	7	7	9	5	4	5	4	2	3	3	3	4	2	2	2
Guadalajara	5	5	9	6	8	4	2	4	1	1	2	2	2	3	4	4	3
Toluca	2	1	2	4	2	1	1	2	5	3	1	1	1	1	3	5	4
Santos Laguna	8	6	8	3	4	6	5	7	8	11	8	5	6	6	5	6	5
Atlas	18	12	15	9	10	11	8	6	6	10	11	6	7	7	7	3	6
Tigres UANL	9	14	10	12	14	16	13	15	12	13	13	12	11	9	9	8	7
Morelia	3	3	6	11	13	10	12	13	10	7	9	10	10	10	11	9	8
América	10	15	18	15	11	12	14	11	13	9	7	7	5	6	6	7	9
Pachuca	1	2	3	5	7	3	6	3	2	5	5	8	8	8	8	10	10
Cruz Azul	6	10	11	13	12	14	16	17	14	14	15	16	14	15	14	15	11
Necaxa	14	17	13	16	15	13	15	16	17	15	17	17	17	16	15	13	12
Veracruz	7	9	5	10	5	8	10	14	16	17	14	15	13	14	13	11	13
León	16	11	14	14	16	17	18	18	18	18	18	14	16	12	10	12	14
Querétaro	15	13	16	17	17	15	9	8	9	6	10	11	12	13	16	14	15
Chiapas	11	16	12	8	6	9	11	9	11	12	12	13	15	17	17	17	16
UNAM	13	8	4	2	3	7	7	10	7	8	6	9	9	11	12	16	17
Puebla	12	18	17	18	18	18	17	12	15	16	16	18	18	18	18	18	18

Leader and qualification to playoffs
Qualification to playoffs
Last place in table

=== Results ===
Home \ Away	AMÉ	ATL	CHI	CAZ	GUA	LEÓ	MON	MOR	NEC	PAC	PUE	QUE	SLA	TIJ	TOL	UNL	UNM	VER
América		1–2		2–0			1–0		1–0	2–3	0–0	1–0						1–0
Atlas			0–1		1–2	2–0		3–1		1–0			1–1	3–3		2–0	0–0	
Chiapas	2–0				4–3	0–0		1–2					2–2	1–2		1–0	0–3	
Cruz Azul		0–1	2–0		2–1		2–2	1–1	1–0			1–1				0–0		
Guadalajara	1–0					1–1					3–2		1–1	0–1	2–0		2–1	2–0
León	1–1			1–2						2–4	1–0		2–2	2–4	2–3		0–1	4–0
Monterrey		2–0	4–1		2–2	0–0		1–2		1–0		4–1				1–0	2–0	
Morelia	0–2				0–0	1–2							1–1	2–0	1–2		4–0	1–0
Necaxa		1–1	2–2		0–0	0–1	1–1	2–1		1–0		1–4				1–1		
Pachuca			1–0	2–2	0–0			0–0			0–0				0–0	1–0		1–0
Puebla		1–1	3–0	2–1			2–3	0–1	0–1			0–0				0–2		
Querétaro		1–4	2–2		0–1	2–1		0–0		3–0				0–1		1–5	4–3	
Santos Laguna	2–1			2–2			2–2		2–2	1–0	2–0	1–0			2–2			2–1
Tijuana	0–0			1–0			2–0		1–2	2–3	6–2		1–1		2–0			0–1
Toluca	2–1	4–1	0–1	0–2			1–1		2–0		1–3	1–2						1–0
Tigres UANL	4–2				3–0	0–1		1–1					0–0	3–0	0–1		4–0	
UNAM	2–3			1–0					3–1	1–1	0–1		2–1	3–3	0–1			0–2
Veracruz		1–0	2–0	3–1			1–0		0–1		3–2	1–0						

Updated to match(es) played on 7 May 2017. Source:
Legend: Blue = home team win; Yellow = draw; Red = away team win.

=== Top goalscorers ===
Players sorted first by goals scored, then by last name.

Rank	Player	Club	Goals
1	(Peru) Raúl Ruidíaz	Morelia	9
2	(Argentina) Matías Alustiza	Atlas	8
2	(Chile) Nicolás Castillo	UNAM	8
2	(France) André-Pierre Gignac	Tigres UANL	8
2	(Colombia) Avilés Hurtado	Tijuana	8
2	(Mexico) Oribe Peralta	América	8
7	(Argentina) Mauro Boselli	León	7
8	(Colombia) Edwin Cardona	Monterrey	6
8	(Colombia) Dorlan Pabón	Monterrey	6
8	(Chile) Edson Puch	Necaxa	6
8	(Uruguay) Jonathan Rodríguez	Santos Laguna	6
8	(Brazil) Camilo Sanvezzo	Querétaro	6

Source: ESPN FC

==== Hat-tricks ====
Player	For	Against	Result	Date
(Mexico) Hirving Lozano	Pachuca	León	4–2	7 January 2017
(Peru) Raúl Ruidíaz	Morelia	UNAM	4–0	29 April 2017
(France) André-Pierre Gignac	UANL	Querétaro	5–1	6 May 2017

==== Clean sheets ====
Rank	Player	Club	Clean sheets	GA
1	(Argentina) Agustín Marchesín	América	8	1.12
2	(Mexico) Óscar Pérez	Pachuca	7	0.94
2	(Mexico) Rodolfo Cota	Guadalajara	7	1.06
2	(Mexico) Gibrán Lajud	Tijuana	7	1.29
5	(Mexico) Carlos Felipe Rodríguez	Morelia	6	1.00
5	(United States) William Yarbrough	León	6	1.35
7	(Argentina) Nahuel Guzmán	Tigres UANL	5	0.60
7	(Mexico) Hugo González	Monterrey	5	0.94
7	(Mexico) Alfredo Talavera	Toluca	5	1.18

Source: Fox Soccer

==== Saves ====
Rank	Player	Club	Saves
1	(Argentina) Marcelo Barovero	Necaxa	80
2	(Mexico) Moisés Muñoz	Chiapas	76
3	(United States) William Yarbrough	León	71
4	(Mexico) Rodolfo Cota	Guadalajara	68
5	(Brazil) Tiago Volpi	Querétaro	67
6	(Argentina) Agustín Marchesín	América	62
7	(Mexico) Alfredo Talavera	Toluca	57
8	(Argentina) Cristian Campestrini	Puebla	53
9	(Mexico) Carlos Felipe Rodríguez	Morelia	51
10	(Mexico) Hugo González	Monterrey	50

Source: Fox Soccer

=== Attendances ===
Pos	Team	Total	High	Low	Average	Change
1	Monterrey	440,644	52,237	44,341	48,960	+1.2%
2	Tigres UANL	330,620	41,539	41,116	41,328	−0.2%
3	Atlas	335,309	53,219	25,867	37,257	+38.1%
4	Guadalajara	286,404	44,183	29,931	35,801	+4.9%
5	América	250,950	48,289	20,645	31,369	−20.0%
6	UNAM	272,784	43,635	22,400	30,309	+31.6%
7	Morelia	238,535	33,520	26,234	29,817	+30.4%
8	Tijuana	235,697	27,333	20,133	26,189	+1.1%
9	Pachuca	203,337	27,512	20,539	25,417	+9.9%
10	Santos Laguna	228,247	29,564	20,620	25,361	+25.2%
11	Puebla	194,690	41,625	10,007	24,336	−27.2%
12	Querétaro	207,213	30,578	18,207	23,024	−6.1%
13	Toluca	205,972	27,194	17,217	22,886	+35.2%
14	Chiapas	170,064	26,732	11,335	21,258	+4.5%
15	Cruz Azul	167,398	27,492	12,282	20,925	+2.9%
16	León	186,815	28,281	15,799	20,757	+8.7%
17	Veracruz	142,554	27,001	0	17,819	−12.0%
18	Necaxa	152,240	22,231	12,200	16,916	−2.1%
	League total	4,249,473	53,219	0	27,774	+4.4%

Updated to games played on 7 May 2017
Source: Liga MX
Notes:
Only regular season listed

=== Final phase ===
==== Bracket ====
Quarterfinals
3	Guadalajara (s)	0	1	1
6	Atlas	1	0	1
4	Toluca	4	1	5
5	Santos Laguna	1	3	4
1	Tijuana	0	2	2
8	Morelia	1	0	1
2	Monterrey	1	0	1
7	UANL	4	2	6

Semifinals
3	Guadalajara (s)	1	1	2
4	Toluca	1	1	2
1	Tijuana	0	0	0
7	UANL	2	2	4

Finals
3	Guadalajara	2	2	4
7	UANL	2	1	3

- Teams are re-seeded each round.
- Team with more goals on aggregate after two matches advances.
- Away goals rule is applied in the quarterfinals and semifinals, but not the final.
- In the quarterfinals and semifinals, if the two teams are tied on aggregate and away goals, the higher seeded team advances.
- In the final, if the two teams are tied after both legs, the match goes to extra-time and, if necessary, a shootout.
- Both finalists qualify to the 2018 CONCACAF Champions League (in Pot 3).

==== Quarterfinals ====
Team 1	Agg.	Team 2	1st leg	2nd leg
Morelia	1–2	Tijuana	1–0	0–2
UANL	6–1	Monterrey	4–1	2–0
Atlas	1–1 (s)	Guadalajara	1–0	0–1
Santos Laguna	4–5	Toluca	1–4	3–1

==== Semifinals ====
Team 1	Agg.	Team 2	1st leg	2nd leg
UANL	4–0	Tijuana	2–0	2–0
Toluca	2–2 (s)	Guadalajara	1–1	1–1

==== Finals ====
Team 1	Agg.	Team 2	1st leg	2nd leg
UANL	3–4	Guadalajara	2–2	1–2

Champions

12th title

== Relegation table ==
Pos	Team	'14 A Pts	'15 C Pts	'15 A Pts	'16 C Pts	'16 A Pts	'17 C Pts	Total Pts	Total Pld	GD	Avg	Relegation
1	América	31	29	28	29	28	24	169	102	+32	1.6569	Safe for 2017–18 Season
2	Tigres UANL	31	29	28	24	30	25	167	102	+59	1.6373	Safe for 2017–18 Season
3	Monterrey	27	24	23	37	25	27	163	102	+35	1.5980	Safe for 2017–18 Season
4	Toluca	29	24	32	22	24	27	158	102	+18	1.5490	Safe for 2017–18 Season
5	Pachuca	25	25	21	30	31	21	153	102	+33	1.5000	Safe for 2017–18 Season
6	UNAM	24	22	35	22	27	18	148	102	+12	1.4510	Safe for 2017–18 Season
7	Guadalajara	16	26	21	28	28	27	146	102	+11	1.4314	Safe for 2017–18 Season
8	León	22	16	30	30	26	20	144	102	+6	1.4118	Safe for 2017–18 Season
9	Tijuana	21	24	16	18	33	31	143	102	+4	1.4020	Safe for 2017–18 Season
10	Necaxa	Ascenso MX				26	20	47	34	+1	1.3824	Safe for 2017–18 Season
11	Atlas	31	28	17	14	19	26	135	102	−18	1.3235	Safe for 2017–18 Season
12	Santos Laguna	23	25	17	27	16	26	134	102	−5	1.3137	Safe for 2017–18 Season
13	Cruz Azul	21	25	20	22	19	21	128	102	−3	1.2549	Safe for 2017–18 Season
14	Querétaro	21	26	22	19	20	19	127	102	−12	1.2451	Safe for 2017–18 Season
15	Puebla	16	20	27	22	20	16	121	102	−20	1.1863	Safe for 2017–18 Season
16	Morelia	10	13	23	28	20	24	118	102	−28	1.1569	Safe for 2017–18 Season
17	Veracruz	15	28	27	14	12	21	117	102	−39	1.1471	Safe for 2017–18 Season
18	Chiapas (R)	28	20	29	12	9	19	117	102	−49	1.1471	Relegated to Ascenso MX

Last update: 7 May 2017

Rules for relegation: 1) Relegation coefficient; 2) Goal difference; 3) Number of goals scored; 4) Head-to-head results between tied teams; 5) Number of goals scored away; 6) Fair Play points
R = Relegated. Chiapas were relegated based on having a worse goal difference over the last three years than Veracruz.
Source: LigaMX

== Aggregate table ==
The aggregate table (the sum of points of both the Apertura and Clausura tournaments) will be used to determine the participants of the Apertura 2017 Copa MX. This table also displays teams that have qualified for the 2018 CONCACAF Champions League.

Pos	Team	Pld	W	D	L	GF	GA	GD	Pts	Qualification or relegation
1	Tijuana	34	19	7	8	55	35	+20	64	Copa MX Pot 1 CONCACAF Champions League
2	Tigres UANL	34	15	10	9	48	25	+23	55	Copa MX Pot 1 CONCACAF Champions League
3	Pachuca	34	15	10	9	52	37	+15	55	Copa MX Pot 1
4	Guadalajara	34	15	10	9	42	35	+7	55	Copa MX Pot 1 CONCACAF Champions League
5	Monterrey	34	13	13	8	56	39	+17	52	Copa MX Pot 1
6	América	34	14	10	10	48	45	+3	52	Copa MX Pot 2 CONCACAF Champions League
7	Toluca	34	14	9	11	43	41	+2	51	Copa MX Pot 2
8	Necaxa	34	11	14	9	40	39	+1	47	Copa MX Pot 2
9	León	34	12	10	12	45	47	−2	46	Copa MX Pot 2
10	Atlas	34	11	12	11	45	45	0	45	Copa MX Pot 3
11	UNAM	34	13	6	15	49	52	−3	45	Copa MX Pot 3
12	Morelia	34	11	11	12	47	50	−3	44	Copa MX Pot 3
13	Santos Laguna	34	9	15	10	44	50	−6	42	Copa MX Pot 3
14	Cruz Azul	34	9	13	12	43	42	+1	40	Copa MX Pot 3
15	Querétaro	34	10	9	15	41	51	−10	39	Copa MX Pot 3
16	Puebla	34	9	9	16	43	55	−12	36	Copa MX Pot 3
17	Veracruz	34	10	3	21	36	58	−22	33	Copa MX Pot 3
18	Chiapas (R)	34	7	7	20	27	58	−31	28	Relegated to Ascenso MX

Updated to match(es) played on 7 May 2017. Source: Liga MX
Rules for classification: 1) Points; 2) Goal difference; 3) Number of goals scored; 4) Head-to-head results between tied teams; 5) Number of goals scored away; 6) Highest relegation coefficient; 7) Fair Play points
(R) Relegated
