= Ángel Reyna =

Mexican footballer (born 1984)

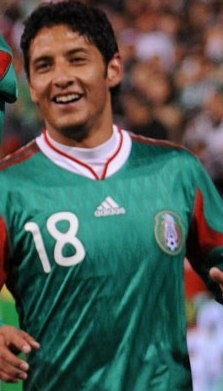
- Reyna with Mexico in 2010

Personal information
- Full name: Ángel Eduardo Reyna Martínez
- Date of birth: 19 September 1984 (age 42)
- Place of birth: Mexico City, Mexico
- Height: 1.71 m (5 ft 7 1/2 in)
- Position: Attacking midfielder

Team information
- Current team: Raniza FC (AKL) (Manager)

Youth career
- América

Senior career*
Years	Team	Apps	(Gls)
2005–2007	San Luis	56	(10)
2007–2008	Necaxa	32	(3)
2008–2009	San Luis	8	(1)
2009–2011	América	89	(27)
2012	Monterrey	39	(7)
2013	→ Pachuca (loan)	16	(5)
2013–2014	Veracruz	25	(8)
2014–2015	Guadalajara	28	(1)
2016–2018	Celaya	45	(15)
2017	→ Veracruz (loan)	15	(1)
2018	→ Toluca (loan)	14	(1)
2019	Veracruz	12	(0)
Total		380	(79)

International career
2010–2013	Mexico	25	(2)

Managerial career
- 2024: Peluche Caligari (AKL)
- 2024–: Raniza FC (AKL)
Medal record
Representing Mexico
CONCACAF Gold Cup
Winner	CONCACAF Gold Cup	2011
- * Club domestic league appearances and goals

Ángel Eduardo Reyna Martínez (born 19 September 1984) is a Mexican former professional footballer who played as an attacking midfielder.

== Club career ==
=== San Luis ===
Reyna came out of América's reserves but was given his professional debut at San Luis on 31 July 2005. He scored his first goal in the Primera División against Pumas UNAM on 5 February 2006.

=== Necaxa ===
After his stint at San Luis, Reyna was signed by Necaxa.

=== América ===
On 18 December 2008, Reyna signed with Mexico City giants América, where he was "born" as a footballer, to be the new reinforcement for the Clausura 2009 season. His debut was against rivals Chivas Guadalajara in the InterLiga tournament where the match ended in a 1–1 draw.

For the Bicentenario 2010 season, after the shooting of Salvador Cabañas, Reyna became a reference player for the team and one of their top scorers, going on to score 7 goals in 16 appearances, including the 9000th goal in the history of the Estadio Azteca in a 2–2 draw with Pachuca.

On 3 April 2011, Reyna scored his first hat-trick for América in a 5–4 win against Puebla in the Clausura 2011 tournament. On 1 May 2011 after scoring the second goal in the 91st minute in the 2–0 win over home-side Pumas, he scored his 13th league goal, thus becoming goalscoring champion of the Clausura 2011. He made team history by scoring 13 goals making him the second Mexican-born goalscoring champion, the last one being Cuauhtemoc Blanco in 1998, who scored 16 goals.

On 24 October 2011, Reyna was separated from the first team after saying that the team's captain, Aquivaldo Mosquera, was made of "water" and that América had a defense of "plastic". América was in the 16th position of the league and had one of the worst defenses in the tournament. After that declarations Reyna was separated of the team.

=== Monterrey ===
==== 2011–12: Debut season and CONCACAF Champions League title ====
On 21 December 2011, Reyna joined C.F. Monterrey. He scored 4 goals and 3 assist in his first tournament with Monterrey. His team won the 2011-12 CONCACAF Champions League and was the runner-up for the Mexican Clausura 2012.

==== 2012–13: Loan to Pachuca ====
He showed off on the CONCACAF following tournament by scoring a hat-trick in the 5–0 victory over Chorrillo F.C. in the opening match.

In 2013, Reyna was sent on loan to Pachuca where he scored five goals in 16 matches played.

=== Veracruz ===
On 17 June 2013, Veracruz reached an agreement with Monterrey to purchase Reyna. He had an outstanding start with the club by scoring 7 goals in only the first 3 league matches.

=== Guadalajara ===
On 29 May 2014, Reyna made a controversial move to Guadalajara for a fee of US$3.56 million. In August 2015, he was sent to train with the reserve squad after the club's president said he was not showing commitment with the team. On 10 March 2016, the club announced that they had reached an agreement to terminate his contract by mutual consent.

== International career ==
In 2010, Reyna was called up by Javier Aguirre to play a series of friendlies with the Mexico national team against Bolivia national team, North Korea national team, and Iceland national team, where he appeared as a substitute in all three matches.

After being the Clausura 2011 top-goalscorer, he was called up by new national team coach José Manuel de la Torre for a series of friendlies against Ecuador and New Zealand national football team, and for the 2011 CONCACAF Gold Cup.

== Career statistics ==
=== Club ===
As of match played on 15 April 2018

Appearances and goals by club, season and competition
Club	Season	League			Cup		League cup		Other		Total	
Club	Season	Division	Apps	Goals	Apps	Goals	Apps	Goals	Apps	Goals	Apps	Goals
Necaxa	2008	Primera División de México	?	3	—		—		—		?	3
San Luis	2008	Primera División de México	8	1	—		—		2	0	10	1
América	2009	Primera División de México	14	2	—		—		2	0	16	2
América	2009–10	Mexican Primera División	37	10	—		—		4	1	41	11
América	2010–11	Mexican Primera División	30	14	—		—		8	0	38	14
América	2011–12	Mexican Primera División	8	1	—		—		—		8	1
América	Total		89	27	0	0	0	0	14	1	103	28
Monterrey	2011–12	Mexican Primera División	22	4	—		—		6	1	28	5
Monterrey	2012–13	Liga MX	17	3	—		—		3	3	20	6
Monterrey	Total		39	7	0	0	0	0	9	4	48	11
Pachuca (loan)	2012–13	Liga MX	16	5	1	0	—		—		17	5
Veracruz	2013–14	Liga MX	25	8	4	2	—		—		29	10
Guadalajara	2014–15	Liga MX	27	1	6	1	—		—		33	2
Guadalajara	2015–16	Liga MX	2	0	2	0	—		—		4	0
Guadalajara	Total		29	1	8	1	0	0	0	0	37	2
Celaya	2016–17	Ascenso MX	17	7	4	2	—		—		21	9
Celaya	2017–18	Ascenso MX	15	4	4	0	—		—		19	4
Celaya	2018–19	Ascenso MX	0	0	—		—		—		0	0
Celaya	Total		32	11	8	2	0	0	0	0	40	13
Veracruz (loan)	2016–17	Liga MX	15	1	—		—		—		15	1
Toluca (loan)	2017–18	Liga MX	8	1	7	1	—		—		15	2
Career totals			261	65	28	6	0	0	23	5	312	76

=== International ===
As of match played 10 September 2013

National team	Year	Apps	Goals
Mexico	2010	3	0
Mexico	2011	5	0
Mexico	2012	8	1
Mexico	2013	9	1
Total		25	2

=== International goals ===
#	Date	Venue	Opponent	Score	Result	Competition
1.	12 October 2012	BBVA Compass Stadium, Houston, United States	Guyana	5–0	5–0	2014 FIFA World Cup qualification
2.	14 August 2013	MetLife Stadium, East Rutherford, United States	Ivory Coast	4–1	4–1	Friendly

== Honours ==
Monterrey

- CONCACAF Champions League: 2011–12

Guadalajara

- Copa MX: Apertura 2015

Mexico

- CONCACAF Gold Cup: 2011

Individual

- Mexican Primera División Best Attacking Midfielder: Clausura 2011
- Mexican Primera División Golden Boot: Clausura 2011
