= Apertura 2016 Liga MX final phase =

Apertura 2016 Final phase
Tournament details
- Country: Mexico
- Dates: 23 November–25 December 2016
- Teams: 8

Final positions
- Champions: UANL (5th title)
- Runners-up: América

Tournament statistics
- Matches played: 14
- Goals scored: 35 (2.5 per match)
- Attendance: 531,675 (37,977 per match)

The Apertura 2016 Liga MX championship stage commonly known as liguilla (mini league) was being played from November 23 to December 25. A total of eight teams were competing in the championship stage to decide the champions of the Apertura 2016 Liga MX season. Both finalists qualified to the 2018 CONCACAF Champions League.

== Qualified teams ==
Pos	Team	Pld	W	D	L	GF	GA	GD	Pts
1	Tijuana	17	10	3	4	25	13	+12	33
2	Pachuca	17	9	4	4	36	21	+15	31
3	UANL	17	8	6	3	22	13	+9	30
4	Guadalajara	17	8	4	5	21	17	+4	28
5	América	17	7	7	3	29	26	+3	28
6	UNAM	17	8	3	6	28	22	+6	27
7	Necaxa	17	6	8	3	24	18	+6	26
8	León	17	7	5	5	25	25	0	26

Source: LigaMX.net
Rules for classification: 1) Points; 2) Goal difference; 3) Number of goals scored; 4) Head-to-head results between tied teams; 5) Number of goals scored away; 6) Highest relegation coefficient; 7) Fair Play points

== Format ==
- Teams are re-seeded each round.
- Team with more goals on aggregate after two matches advancef.
- Away goals rule is applied in the quarterfinals and semifinals, but not the final.
- In the quarterfinals and semifinals, if the two teams were tied on aggregate and away goals, the higher seeded team advanced.
- In the final, if the two teams were tied after both legs, the match went to extra time and, if necessary, a shoot-out.
- Both finalists qualified to the 2018 CONCACAF Champions League (in Pot 3).

=== Bracket ===
Quarterfinals
3	UANL	2	5	7
6	UNAM	2	0	2
1	Tijuana	0	3	3
8	León	3	2	5
4	Guadalajara	1	0	1
5	América	1	1	2
2	Pachuca	1	0	1
7	Necaxa	2	0	2

Semifinals
3	UANL	1	2	3
8	León	0	1	1
5	América	1	2	3
7	Necaxa	1	0	1

Finals
3	UANL (p)	1	1	2 (3)
5	América	1	1	2 (0)

== Quarterfinals ==
Team 1	Agg.	Team 2	1st leg	2nd leg
León	5–3	Tijuana	3–0	2–3
UNAM	2–7	UANL	2–2	0–5
Necaxa	2–1	Pachuca	2–1	0–0
América	2–1	Guadalajara	1–1	1–0

All times are UTC−6 except for match in Tijuana

=== First leg ===
23 November 2016
19:30

León	3–0	Tijuana
Boselli 12'; Navarro 17'; Cano 62'	Report

Estadio León, León
Attendance: 18,004
Referee: Oscar Macías Romo (Aguascalientes)

23 November 2016
21:30

UNAM	2–2	UANL
Barrera 36' (pen.); Martínez 66'	Report	Sosa 8'; Damm 48'

Estadio Olímpico Universitario, Mexico City
Attendance: 34,835
Referee: Jorge Isaac Rojas (Mexico City)

24 November 2016
19:30

Necaxa	2–1	Pachuca
Gallegos 33'; Riano 85'	Report	Guzmán 66'

Estadio Victoria, Aguascalientes
Attendance: 15,270
Referee: Erick Yair Miranda (Guanajuato)

24 November 2016
21:30

América	1–1	Guadalajara
William 24'	Report	Salcido 45+7' (pen.)

Estadio Azteca, Mexico City
Attendance: 55,662
Referee: Paul Delgadillo (Jalisco)

=== Second leg ===
26 November 2016
19:00

UANL	5–0	UNAM
Gignac 4', 75', 79'; Verón 26' (o.g.); Delort 89'	Report

Estadio Universitario, San Nicolás de los Garza
Attendance: 41,469
Referee: Fernando Guerrero (Mexico City)

UANL won 7–2 on aggregate.

26 November 2016
19:00 (UTC–8)

Tijuana	3–2	León
D. Moreno 13'; Corona 41'; Rodríguez 43'	Report	Boselli 81'; Montes 84'

Estadio Caliente, Tijuana
Attendance: 26,733
Referee: Luis Enrique Santander (Guanajuato)

León won 5–3 on aggregate.

27 November 2016
18:06

Guadalajara	0–1	América
	Report	Peralta 55'

Estadio Chivas, Zapopan
Attendance: 41,566
Referee: Roberto García Orozco (Mexico City)

América won 2–1 on aggregate.

27 November 2016
20:06

Pachuca	0–0	Necaxa
	Report

Estadio Hidalgo, Pachuca
Attendance: 25,385
Referee: César Arturo Ramos (Sinaloa)

Necaxa won 2–1 on aggregate.

== Semifinals ==
Team 1	Agg.	Team 2	1st leg	2nd leg
León	1–3	UANL	0–1	1–2
Necaxa	1–3	América	1–1	0–2

All times are UTC−6

=== First leg ===
30 November 2016
20:36

León	0–1	UANL
	Report	Gignac 56'

Estadio León, León
Attendance: 26,553
Referee: Paul Delgadillo (Jalisco)

1 December 2016
21:00

Necaxa	1–1	América
Gallegos 63'	Report	William 68'

Estadio Victoria, Aguascalientes
Attendance: 22,746
Referee: Jorge Isaac Rojas (Mexico City)

=== Second leg ===
3 December 2016
19:00

UANL	2–1	León
Gignac 45+2'; Zelarrayán 78'	Report	Montes 17'

Estadio Universitario, San Nicolás de los Garza
Attendance: 41,523
Referee: César Arturo Ramos (Sinaloa)

UANL won 3–1 on aggregate.

4 December 2016
20:00

América	2–0	Necaxa
William 75'; Peralta 84'	Report

Estadio Azteca, Mexico City
Attendance: 68,534
Referee: Fernando Guerrero (Mexico City)

América won 3–1 on aggregate.

== Finals ==
Team 1	Agg.	Team 2	1st leg	2nd leg
América	2–2 (0–3 p)	UANL	1–1	1–1 (a.e.t.)

All times are UTC−6

=== First leg ===
22 December 2016
21:00

América	1–1	UANL
Valdez 68'	Report	Gignac 45'

Estadio Azteca, Mexico City
Attendance: 71,780
Referee: Paul Delgadillo (Jalisco)

América
UANL

GK	23	(Mexico) Moisés Muñoz
DF	6	(Paraguay) Miguel Samudio
DF	2	(Argentina) Paolo Goltz
DF	12	(Paraguay) Pablo Aguilar
DF	18	(Paraguay) Bruno Valdez
MF	21	(Mexico) José Guerrero	(yellow card) 12'	(substituted off) 46'
MF	7	(Brazil) William
MF	14	(Argentina) Rubens Sambueza (c)	(yellow card) 38'
MF	30	(Ecuador) Renato Ibarra
MF	11	(Ecuador) Michael Arroyo		(substituted off) 73'
FW	24	(Mexico) Oribe Peralta	(yellow card) 83'
Substitutions:
GK	1	(Mexico) Hugo González
DF	15	(Mexico) Osmar Mares
DF	17	(United States) Ventura Alvarado
DF	282	(Mexico) Edson Álvarez		(substituted on) 46'
MF	5	(Mexico) Javier Güémez
FW	9	(Argentina) Silvio Romero
FW	31	(Colombia) Darwin Quintero		(substituted on) 73'
Manager:
(Argentina) Ricardo La Volpe

GK	1	(Argentina) Nahuel Guzmán
DF	6	(Mexico) Jorge Torres Nilo
DF	3	(Brazil) Juninho (c)
DF	4	(Mexico) Hugo Ayala		(yellow card) 9'
DF	29	(Mexico) Jesús Dueñas
MF	8	(Argentina) Lucas Zelarrayán		(substituted off) 65'
MF	19	(Argentina) Guido Pizarro
MF	20	(Mexico) Javier Aquino
MF	18	(Argentina) Ismael Sosa		(substituted off) 90+2'
MF	25	(Mexico) Jürgen Damm
FW	10	(France) André-Pierre Gignac		(substituted off) 76'
Substitutions:
GK	22	(Mexico) Enrique Palos
DF	14	(Mexico) Jorge Iván Estrada	(yellow card) 82'	(substituted on) 65'
DF	24	(Mexico) José Rivas		(substituted on) 90+2'
MF	11	(Mexico) Damián Álvarez
MF	17	(United States) José Francisco Torres
MF	27	(Mexico) Alberto Acosta
FW	9	(France) Andy Delort		(substituted on) 76'
Manager:
(Brazil) Ricardo Ferretti

Assistant referees:
Marvin Torrentera (Mexico City)
Andres Hernández Delgado (Mexico City)
Fourth official:
Erick Yair Miranda (Guanajuato)

=== Second leg ===
25 December 2016
18:30

UANL	1–1 (a.e.t.)	América
Dueñas 119'	Report	Álvarez 95'
Penalties
Gignac (penalty scored); Juninho (penalty scored); Pizarro (penalty scored)	3–0	(penalty missed) William; (penalty missed) Romero; (penalty missed) Güémez

Estadio Universitario, San Nicolás de los Garza
Attendance: 41,615
Referee: Jorge Isaac Rojas (Mexico City)

2–2 on aggregate. UANL won 3–0 on penalty kicks.

UANL
América

GK	1	(Argentina) Nahuel Guzmán
DF	6	(Mexico) Jorge Torres Nilo	(yellow card) 69' (yellow-red card) 90'
DF	3	(Brazil) Juninho (c)
DF	4	(Mexico) Hugo Ayala	(yellow card) 101'
DF	14	(Mexico) Jorge Iván Estrada		(substituted off) 90+3'
MF	19	(Argentina) Guido Pizarro	(yellow card) 22'
MF	29	(Mexico) Jesús Dueñas
MF	20	(Mexico) Javier Aquino		(substituted off) 55'
MF	18	(Argentina) Ismael Sosa		(substituted off) 90+3'
MF	25	(Mexico) Jürgen Damm
FW	10	(France) André-Pierre Gignac	(yellow card) 105+1'
Substitutions:
GK	22	(Mexico) Enrique Palos
DF	24	(Mexico) José Rivas	(red card) 105+4'	(substituted on) 90+3'
MF	8	(Argentina) Lucas Zelarrayán
MF	11	(Mexico) Damián Álvarez		(substituted on) 55'
MF	27	(Mexico) Alberto Acosta		(substituted on) 90+3'
FW	9	(France) Andy Delort
FW	33	(Colombia) Julián Quiñones
Manager:
(Brazil) Ricardo Ferretti

GK	23	(Mexico) Moisés Muñoz
DF	6	(Paraguay) Miguel Samudio	(yellow card) 118'
DF	2	(Argentina) Paolo Goltz	(red card) 105+4'
DF	12	(Paraguay) Pablo Aguilar	(yellow card) 92'
DF	18	(Paraguay) Bruno Valdez	(yellow card) 35'
MF	21	(Mexico) José Guerrero		(substituted off) 85'
MF	7	(Brazil) William
MF	14	(Argentina) Rubens Sambueza (c)	(yellow card) 52' (yellow-red card) 102'
MF	30	(Ecuador) Renato Ibarra
MF	11	(Ecuador) Michael Arroyo	(yellow card) 60'	(substituted off) 108'
FW	24	(Mexico) Oribe Peralta		(substituted off) 79'
Substitutions:
GK	1	(Mexico) Hugo González
DF	15	(Mexico) Osmar Mares
DF	17	(United States) Ventura Alvarado	(red card) 105+4'
DF	282	(Mexico) Edson Álvarez		(substituted on) 85'
MF	5	(Mexico) Javier Güémez		(substituted on) 108'
FW	9	(Argentina) Silvio Romero	(yellow card) 101'	(substituted on) 79'
FW	31	(Colombia) Darwin Quintero	(yellow card) 105'
Manager:
(Argentina) Ricardo La Volpe

Assistant referees:
Juan Joel Rangel (Mexico City)
Mario Jesús López (Durango)
Fourth official:
Fernando Guerrero (Mexico City)

Apertura 2016 winners

5th title

== Goalscorers ==
6 goals

- (France) André-Pierre Gignac (UANL)

3 goals

- (Brazil) William (América)

2 goals

- (Argentina) Mauro Boselli (León)
- (Chile) Felipe Gallegos (Necaxa)
- (Mexico) Luis Montes (León)
- (Mexico) Oribe Peralta (América)

1 goal

- (Mexico) Edson Álvarez (América)
- (Mexico) Pablo Barrera (UNAM)
- (Argentina) Germán Cano (León)
- (Mexico) Yasser Corona (Tijuana)
- (Mexico) Jürgen Damm (UANL)
- (France) Andy Delort (UANL)
- (Mexico) Jesús Dueñas (UANL)
- (Mexico) Víctor Guzmán (Pachuca)
- (Ecuador) Fidel Martínez (UNAM)
- (Colombia) Dayro Moreno (Tijuana)
- (Mexico) Fernando Navarro (León)
- (Argentina) Claudio Riaño (Necaxa)
- (Argentina) Guido Rodríguez (Tijuana)
- (Mexico) Carlos Salcido (Guadalajara)
- (Argentina) Ismael Sosa (UANL)
- (Paraguay) Bruno Valdez (América)
- (Argentina) Lucas Zelarrayán (UANL)

Own goals

- (Paraguay) Darío Verón (for UANL)
