= Kings League Mexico =

Seven-a-side football league set in Mexico City

- Founded: 24 October 2023; 2 years ago
- First season: 2024
- Country: Hispanic America
- Number of clubs: 12
- Current champions: (Venezuela) Los Chamos (1st title) (3rd Split, 2025)
- Broadcaster(s): Twitch; YouTube; Facebook; Vix (formerly); Fox Sports (Mexico) (formerly); ESPN; Disney+
- Website: kingsleague.pro/americas

The Kings League Mexico previously known as Kings League Américas (also known as Kings League Openbank for sponsorship reasons) is a seven-a-side football league made up of twelve teams presided by footballers and internet streamers from across Hispanic America. It is based on Spain's Kings League, launched by Gerard Piqué in late 2022.

== Background ==
After the Kings League began play in early 2023, league CEO Oriol Querol stated that they had a goal to bring the format to multiple countries, with talks for a version in Brazil and another one across Hispanic America ongoing at the time. The Hispanic American league was formally announced on 14 July 2023, with a statement saying that it would begin play in 2024 in Mexico City. Two weeks later, during the Kings and Queens Finals event held at the Metropolitano Stadium in Madrid, Mexican footballer Javier Hernández was the first team chairman to be announced.

A launch event for the league was held on 24 October 2023, with the reveal of all the competing teams and chairpersons, where it was also announced that former Mexico national team player Miguel Layún would be serving as chairman of the league, with Marc Crosas appointed as the league's sporting director.

The league includes a team styled after the eponymous football club from the Mexican comedy-drama Netflix series Club de Cuervos. Luis Gerardo Méndez and Mariana Treviño reprised their roles from the show as Chava and Isabel Iglesias respectively for a club announcement trailer featuring Piqué that was aired during the league's launch.

== Team organisation ==
The initial teams and their chairpersons were announced during the league's launch event on 24 October 2023. The only change so far is Kunisports (renamed to KRÜ FC) and Aniquiladores FC entering from Kings League Spain, replacing Muchachos FC and Real Titán after the 2024-25 season.

| Team | Manager | Chairperson(s) |
|---|---|---|
| (Colombia) Aniquiladores FC | (Argentina) Sergio Verdirame | (Colombia) Juan Guarnizo |
| (Colombia) Atlético Parceros | (Mexico) Víctor Chaires | (Colombia) James Rodríguez and Angerson García (Pelicanger) |
| (Mexico) Club de Cuervos | (Mexico) Rafael Puente Jr. | (Mexico) Natalia García (NataliaMX) and Iván Navarrete (Pipepunk) |
| (Dominican Republic) Galácticos del Caribe | (Mexico) Fernando Espinosa | (Dominican Republic) Angelo "Will" Valdés and Vincent Pérez (Los Futbolitos) and Santiago Matías (Alofoke) |
| (Argentina) KRÜ FC | (Argentina) Martín Posse | (Argentina) Sergio Aguero |
| (United States) Los Aliens 1021 | (Mexico) David Cabrera | (United States) Edwin Castro (Castro) |
| (Venezuela) Los Chamos FC | (Mexico) Jos Gartland | (Venezuela) Donato Muñoz (TheDonato), Flavio Broianigo (YOLO) and (Dominican Republic) Steven Santos (RDjavi) |
| (Mexico) Peluche Caligari | (Mexico) Juan Carlos Cacho | (Mexico) Álex (Escorpión Dorado) and Gabriel Montiel (Werevertumorro) |
| (Peru) Persas FC | (Mexico) Gaby Batocletti | (Peru) Andy Merino (ElZeein) and Nicola Porcella |
| (Mexico) Raniza FC | (Mexico) Ángel Reyna | (Mexico) Iván Quiroga (Oqueioquei) and (Mexico) Alana Flores (AlanaLaRana) |
| (Mexico) Simios FC | | (Mexico) Abraham Flores (Elabrahaham) |
| (Colombia) Guerrilla FC | | (Colombia) MrstivenTc |

=== Past Clubs ===
| Team | Manager | Chairperson(s) |
|---|---|---|
| (Chile) Real Titán | (Mexico) Lucas Ayala | (Chile) Germán Garmendia (HolaSoyGérman) and (Mexico) Conterstine |
| (Argentina) Muchachos FC | (Mexico) Omar Flores Desachy | (Argentina) Jero Freixas |
| (Mexico) Olimpo United | (Mexico) Alejandro Castro | (Mexico) Javier Hernández (Chicharito) |
| (Colombia) West Santos FC | (Mexico) Rafael Puente Jr. | (Colombia) Luis Villa (Westcol) and (Puerto Rico) Austin Santos (Arcángel) |

== Performance by team ==
| Team | Titles | Runners-up | Semi-final | Splits won | Splits runner-up | Splits semi-final |
|---|---|---|---|---|---|---|
| (Mexico) Raniza FC | 1 | 0 | 2 | May 2024 | | May 2025, 2025 Kings Cup |
| (Mexico) Olimpo United | 1 | 0 | 0 | December 2024 | | |
| (Mexico) Peluche Caligari | 1 | 0 | 0 | 2025 Kings Cup | | |
| (Venezuela) Los Chamos FC | 1 | 1 | 0 | May 2025 | 2025 Kings Cup | |
| (Colombia) Aniquiladores FC | 1 | 0 | 0 | May 2026 | | |
| (Chile) Real Titán | 0 | 1 | 1 | | May 2024 | December 2024 |
| (Peru) Persas FC | 0 | 1 | 1 | | December 2024 | May 2024 |
| (Dominican Republic) Galácticos del Caribe | 0 | 1 | 2 | | May 2025 | May 2024, May 2026 |
| (Mexico) Club de Cuervos | 0 | 1 | 0 | | May 2026 | |
| (Colombia) West Santos FC | 0 | 0 | 1 | | | December 2024 |
| (United States) Los Aliens 1021 | 0 | 0 | 1 | | | May 2025 |
| (Colombia) Atlético Parceros | 0 | 0 | 2 | | | 2025 Kings Cup, May 2026 |

== See also ==
- Media football
- Kings League
