= Juan Antonio Luna =

Mexican footballer and manager (born 1959)

Personal information
- Full name: Juan Antonio Luna Castro
- Date of birth: 17 May 1959 (age 67)
- Place of birth: Mexico City, Mexico
- Position: Midfielder

Senior career*
Years	Team	Apps	(Gls)
1979-1988	América		
1988–1992	Necaxa		
1992–1993	Puebla		

International career
1980–1987	Mexico	18	(2)

Managerial career
- 2002–2003: San Luis F.C.
- 2008: Club América
- 2009: San Luis F.C.
- 2009–2010: Club Tijuana
- 2013–2014: Veracruz
- 2015–2017: Veracruz Under 20
- 2017: Veracruz
- * Club domestic league appearances and goals

Juan Antonio Luna Castro (born 17 May 1959) is a Mexican former football manager.

== Career ==
In 2002, he signed with San Luis F.C.

After taking a break from managing for 5 years he later became manager of Club América.
