= Alofoke =

Dominican YouTuber and producer (born 1981)

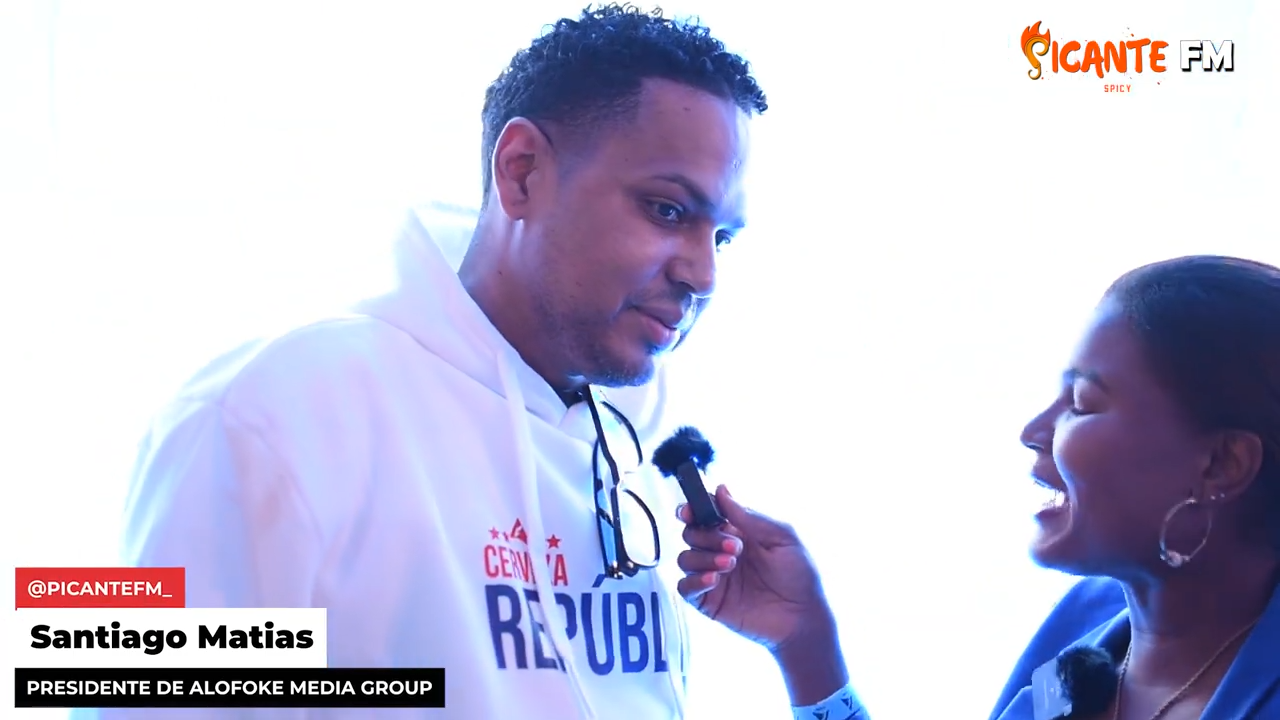
- Alofoke in 2022
- Born: Esmelin Santiago Matías García; December 6, 1981 (age 44); Ensanche Capotillo, Dominican Republic
- Other name: Santiago Matías
- Occupations: host and producer, record producer, celebrity interviewer, businessman
- Years active: 2000-present

YouTube information
- Channel: Alofokeradioshow
- Subscribers: 9.09 million

Esmelin Santiago Matías García (born December 6, 1981), known as Santiago Matías or Alofoke is a Dominican radio host and producer, record producer, celebrity interviewer, businessman and media mogul.

== Career ==
=== Early life ===
Santiago Matías was born on December 6, 1981, in El Capotillo, Distrito Nacional, Dominican Republic to his mother when she was only fifteen. His grandmother and aunt helped her raise him. Santiago started college studying computer engineering, but dropped out in his junior year to devote himself to music. However, his mother made him learn English and other computer courses. He started recording rap songs at a young age in Capotillo and began his professional career in 2000, touring as the backing vocals for Vakero, a famous Dominican rapper.

=== AlofokeMusic media group ===
While touring in many of the provinces of the country, Matías saw the lack of coverage of urbano music in the Dominican media and the enthusiasm of the people wherever they performed, which motivated him in 2006 to start AlofokeMusic, a media group explicitly dedicated to cover urbano music artists in the Dominican Republic.

The company started with the AlofokeMusic website, where he uploaded exclusive content about the underground rap movement and rap battles between artists. Within months of its launch, the website had thousands of daily visitors, which made Matías stop his rapping career and dedicate his time to interviewing and writing about Urban artists. In 2013, he started Alofoke Radio Show, a radio talk show that interviews urbano music celebrities broadcast on Power 103.7 FM and then on KQ 94.5 FM. The same year he started the record label Fuse Music and signed the Dominican-American rapper Mark B and positioned him internationally through collaborations with artists like Bad Bunny and Maluma.

In 2021, Matías, along with Puerto Rican singer and rapper Ozuna, bought Sonido Suave, a Spanish-language bolero and ballad radio station serving Santo Domingo. That same year, it was rebranded as Alofoke FM, and its format changed to urban contemporary. Alofoke Music Group now operates it.

=== Alofoke Sin Censura ===
Alofoke Sin Censura is a segment of the Alofoke Radio Show broadcast on KQ-94.5 FM produced and hosted by Matías, in which he asks the artists to interview personal questions and their opinions on social issues. He has interviewed the majority of the most recent influential Urbano music performers from Dominican Republic and Internationally such as Anuel AA, Bad Bunny, J Balvin, El Alfa, Arcángel, Natti Natasha and more, as well as politicians like the Dominican vice-president Margarita Cedeño de Fernández, former Dominican president Hipólito Mejía and the Dominican presidential candidate Gonzalo Castillo.

In 2021, he denounced receiving threats from Venezuelans after interviewing Dominican musician and culture Vice Minister Bonny Cepeda, where he declared that he received $60 000 to sing at a birthday party of the Venezuelan leader Nicolás Maduro, showing a WhatsApp screenshot where he received racial slurs.

=== Kings League Mexico ===
Since early 2024, he has been part of the project Kings League Mexico (at the time called Kings League Américas), led by Miguel Layún. He is president of one of the participating teams, Galácticos del Caribe (Caribbean Galactics). In this league, he competes against other content creators and celebrities such as Arcángel, Westcol, Germán Garmendia, Chicharito, and James Rodríguez, with the aim of becoming the competition's champions.

=== Political career ===
Matías has announced his intention to run for president in the 2028 Dominican Republic general election, and establish a new political party named Dominicanos Primero (Dominicans First).
