= El Clásico Del Sur =

- Other names: El Clásico Regional
- Location: Puebla and Veracruz
- Teams: Puebla FC and Veracruz
- First meeting: 1943

Statistics
- Most wins: Puebla FC (30)

Puebla	Veracruz

El Clásico Del Sur was a derby played in the Liga MX. The clubs Puebla FC and Veracruz were involved. This rivalry dated back to the amateur era from the early 1930s, before both clubs had been admitted into the professional division in 1944. The name suggests that it is the main football derby in South Mexico.

The rivalry was so big back then that the first match both clubs had in the professional era was against each other in the Copa Mexico tournament in 1943. That game ended in a tie. Both clubs had an early success in the México Primera División in the 1940s and 1950s which made the matches held by these two clubs even more intense. With Puebla's 2 Copa Mexico titles and Veracruz' 2 league titles, the clásico was not contested in 1953, mainly due to economic problems Veracruz had in the mid-1950s. Puebla folded in 1957 due to economic problems and in addition, its home stadium had burned down. The derby would not be played again until 1970 when once again after almost 20 years, the clubs met each other in the 1970 league tournament. Since then, Veracruz made the Estadio Luis de la Fuente their home, and Puebla began the 1970s in their new Estadio Cuauhtémoc. The first match they played since 1953 was held in Puebla in the week 15 of the league tournament which ended in a 1–1 draw.

In the 1980s, the Puebla team would dominate the rivalry games and would also obtain two league titles. In the 1990s, they would face each other 16 times in the league tournaments throughout the decade. Puebla would win 6, lose 7, and draw 3. In the Summer 1999 tournament, Veracruz would beat Puebla, and Puebla would be relegated to the second division, but would remain in the first division for Winter 1999 after buying the franchise of the recently promoted club. In 2004, Puebla would once again be relegated. This time, Veracruz would beat them in week 14 and would send them to the second division. After Puebla's promotion in 2007, it was Veracruz's turn to play in the second division this time, after Puebla defeated Veracruz 2–1 in their home stadium in week 14. Veracruz would have to win their final two matches to remain in the Primera División, a task that they would not achieve, which condemned them to some second division action.

It wasn't until Veracruz bought the newly-promoted La Piedad franchise in 2013 that fans of both sides would see another rivalry game. La Piedad effectively lost its team, giving Veracruz a spot in Liga MX, and since then, the two would have rivalry games again.

In all, Puebla and Veracruz played 68 official matches including league and cup. Puebla has the best record with 30 wins 15 draws and 23 losses with 108 goals scored and 97 conceded. Jorge Comas has the most goals scored in this derby with Veracruz, totalling 8, followed by Puebla's Silvio Fogeul with 7.

With the disaffiliation and dissolution of Veracruz in December 2019, the rivalry is now dormant, barring any resurrection of the club.

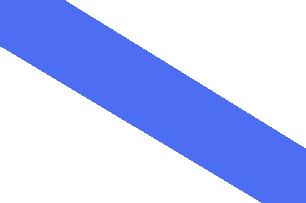
Puebla FC flag

Tiburones Rojos de Veracruz flag

== League Matches ==
=== 1944–1952 ===
These are only the league matches.

Game	Date	jornada	Home team	Away team	Score	Goals (home)	Goals (away)
1	October 15, 1944	15	Veracruz	Puebla F.C	0–0		
2	May 10, 1945	20	Puebla F.C	Veracruz	0–1		(1)Zendejas
3	December 11, 1946	11	Puebla F.C	Veracruz	3–1		
4	May 3, 1946	19	Veracruz	Puebla F.C	3–1		
5	September 12, 1947	9	Puebla F.C	Veracruz	2–1	Baldomero 27 Vaschetto 63'	Leblanc 88'
6	1947	18	Veracruz	Puebla F.C	2–2	Luis De la Fuente 27', Proal 53'	Lupe" 13', Roberto "Changa" Álvarez 68'
7	1948	?	Puebla F.C	Veracruz	2–1	Roberto "Changa" Álvarez 13', 68'	Quiroga 46
8	1948	?	Veracruz	Puebla F.C	1–2	Paratore 16'	Roberto "Changa" Álvarez 44' 70'
9	1949	?	Veracruz	Puebla F.C	0–0		
10	1949	?	Puebla F.C	Veracruz	1–0	Lupe" 65'	
11	1950	?	Puebla F.C	Veracruz	3–5		
13	1950	?	'Veracruz	Puebla F.C	4–1		
14	1951	?	'Veracruz	Puebla F.C	3–1		
15	1951	?	'Puebla F.C	Veracruz	4–3		
17	1952	?	'Puebla F.C	Veracruz	2–3		
18	1952	?	'Veracruz	Puebla F.C	1–2		

From 1952 to 1970, no matches took place due to economic problems with both clubs in the 1950s, Puebla FC folded in 1957 and would not be reformed until 1964 in the second division. The classico would reform after puebla's promotion in 1970.

=== 1970 – 1996 ===
Game	Date	Round	Home team	Away team	Score	Goals (home)	Goals (away)
19	1970	15	Puebla F.C	Veracruz	1–1		
20	1971	32	Veracruz	Puebla F.C	3–0		
21	1971	6	Puebla F.C	Veracruz	4–2		
22	1972	23	Veracruz	Puebla F.C	1–1		
23	1972	11	Veracruz	Puebla F.C	0–0		
24	1973	28	Puebla F.C	Veracruz	3–0		
25	1973	2	Puebla F.C	Veracruz	2–0		
26	1974	19	Veracruz	Puebla F.C	0–1		
27	1974	17	Puebla F.C	Veracruz	2–0		
28	November 29, 1975	5	Puebla F.C	Veracruz	4–0	Carlos Zibecchi 15' 37' 49' Leonardo Peralta 24'	
29	April 11, 1976	24	Veracruz	Puebla F.C	2–0	Guillermo Hernández 13' juan Manuel Herrero 90'	
30	November 28, 1976	5	Veracruz	Puebla F.C	2–1	Juan Carlos Leyva 12' Ricardo Brandón 64'	Silvio Foguel 60'
31	April 10, 1977	31	Puebla F.C	Veracruz	4–1	Silvio Foguel 2' Ernesto Sánchez 45'Juan Alvarado 70' Carlos Zibecchi 90'	Amado Canales 28'
32	August 7, 1977	31	Puebla F.C	Veracruz	0–0		
33	January 8, 1978	21	Veracruz	Puebla F.C	0–2		Silvio Foguel 2'Silvio Foguel 63'
34	November 26, 1978	12	Veracruz	Puebla F.C	0–2		Hugo Fernández 78' Juan Manuel Borbolla 88'
35	April 8, 1979	31	Puebla F.C	Veracruz	5–1	Silvio Foguel 13' 14' Juan Manuel Borbolla 51' Luis Enrique Fernández 56' Juan Alvarado 70'	Juan Manuel Luna 79'
36	September 9, 1989	31	Puebla F.C	Veracruz	3–1	Jorge Aravena (footballer) 19' 40' 54'	Jorge Alberto Comas 15'
37	January 6, 1990	20	'Veracruz	Puebla F.C	1–0	Miguel Gambier 13'	
38	December 19, 1990	14	Puebla F.C	Veracruz	0–0		
39	April 27, 1991	33	Veracruz	Puebla F.C	4–1	Jorge Luis Gabrich 1' Jorge Alberto Comas 67' 89' Omar Óscar Palma 80'	Martín Arturo Vázquez 23'
40	December 11, 1991	15	Puebla F.C	Veracruz	1–0	Carlos Alberto Poblete 58'	
41	April 11, 1992	34	Veracruz	Puebla F.C	3–1	José Luis Malibrán 21' José Ángel Galván 22' Jorge Alberto Comas 77'	Elías Ledezma 77'
42	November 13, 1992	15	Veracruz	Puebla F.C	4–0	Jorge Alberto Comas 8' 41' 63' Silvio Gabriel 86'	
43	March 28, 1993	34	Puebla F.C	Veracruz	2–0	Bruno Mendoza 46' Sergio Lira Gallardo 61'	
44	November 13, 1993	15	Veracruz	Puebla F.C	1–1	Alberto Durán 43'	Roberto Ruiz Esparza 18'
45	March 13, 1994	34	Puebla F.C	Veracruz	0–1		Elías Ledezma 89'
46	November 19, 1994	12	Veracruz	Puebla F.C	0–0		
47	March 25, 1995	31	Puebla F.C	Veracruz	1–0	Teodoro Antonio Dos Santos 48'	
48	May 10, 1995	knockout 1st	'Veracruz	Puebla F.C	1–1	Alberto Durán 55'	Narciso Cuevas 24'
49	May 13, 1995	knockout 2nd	'Puebla F.C'	Veracruz	0–0		
50	October 21, 1995	9	Puebla F.C	Veracruz	2–0	Rodrigo Ruiz 64' 80'	
51	February 17, 1996	12	Veracruz	Puebla F.C	1–0	Carlos Alberto Bianchezi 85'	

=== Split season 1996-2019 ===
In 1996 the long tournaments ended and instead two separate short tournaments would be played with one in the winter and one in the summer. By this means the Copa Mexico tormentor would cease to exist.

Game	Date	Round	Home team	Away team	Score	Goals (home)	Goals (away)
52	November 13, 1996	15	Veracruz	Puebla F.C	0–3		Daniel Guzmán
53	April 23, 1997	20	Puebla F.C	Veracruz	0–0	'	
54	September 6, 1997	6	Veracruz	Puebla F.C	3–2	Armando González 19' Francisco Uribe 52'Juarez 63' '	Carlos Muñoz 83' 85
55	February 22, 1998	9	Puebla F.C	Veracruz	1–0	Felipe del Ángel Malibrán 90'	
56	9 February 2002	6	Puebla F.C	Veracruz	1–2	Alberto García Aspe 47'	Martín Rodríguez 66' Isaac Terrazas 87'
57	September 14, 2002	6	Veracruz	Puebla F.C	2–2	Ángel Morales 5' Isaac Terrazas 26'	Pablo Caballero 8' 16 '
58	March 2, 2003	8	Puebla F.C	Veracruz	0–1		Ángel Morales 76'
59	November 2, 2003	16	Puebla F.C	Veracruz	3–4	Juan Arango 9' Luis Ignacio Quinteros 15' Sigifredo Mercado 64 '	David Mendoza 7' Ángel Morales 12' Emilio Mora 56' Walter Jiménez 74'
60	April 24, 2004	16	Veracruz	Puebla F.C	2–1	David Mendoza 18' Walter Jiménez 64'	Jair García 82'
61	November 13, 2004	16	Puebla F.C	Veracruz	0–0		
62	April 24, 2005	16	Veracruz	Puebla F.C	2–1	Walter Jiménez 60' Lucas Emanuel Ayala 90'	Oscar Mascorro65'
63	October 28, 2007	14	Puebla F.C	Veracruz	0–0		
64	April 11, 2008	14	Veracruz	Puebla F.C	0–2		Álvaro González 14' José Hiber Ruiz 87'
65	August 11, 2013	5	Puebla	Veracruz	0–0		
66	February 1, 2014	5	Veracruz	Puebla	0–1		Alberto Medina 81'
67	July 26, 2014	2	Puebla	Veracruz	0–0		
68	January 16, 2015	2	Veracruz	Puebla	3–1	Jesús Paganoni Julio Furch (x2)	Hérculez Gómez
69	September 18, 2015	2	Veracruz	Puebla	2–1	Aníbal Zurdo Julio Furch	
70	March 6, 2016	2	Puebla	Veracruz	1–1	Christian Bermudez	Julio Furch

After 5 years in Ascenso MX, Veracruz is returned to Liga MX since June 4, 2013 when La Piedad was sold the team and moved to Veracruz

== Notables Clásicos ==
- On April 30, 2005, After having 3 years of poor play Puebla had fallen to the bottom of the regulation table

and in the 16 round of the 2005 Clausrua tournament Puebla loss 2–1 with a goal score by Lucas Ayala in the 90' and so condemning Puebla to the second division.

- On April 11, 2008'Almost 3 years to the date when Veracruz defeated Puebla and send them to the second division, Puebla now defeated Veracruz in the round 14 and practically relegated Veracruz to the second division, where they remain since 2008.
- On August 11, 2013'More than 5 years to June 4, 2013 when Veracruz returned to the Liga MX since 2008 when La Piedad was sold the team to Veracruz and will face in Puebla again in Clasico 65 (Clasico del Sur).
- 29 October 2019, on week 16 of the 2019 Liga MX autumn tournament, Veracruz snapped a 41-game winless streak dating back to August 2018 by beating Puebla 1-0 with a goal by Englishman Colin Kazim-Richards.

=== Top-scoring individuals ===
Tiburones Rojos de Veracruz

- Jorge Comas

Puebla FC

- Silvio Fogel
