= 2018–19 Club Puebla season =

Puebla
2018–19 season
- Chairman: Carlos López Domínguez
- Manager: Enrique Meza (until 3 February); Ignacio Sánchez (from 3 February)
- Stadium: Estadio Cuauhtémoc
- Apertura: 12th
- Clausura: 14th
- Apertura Copa MX: Round of 16
- Top goalscorer: League: Lucas Cavallini (7 goals); All: Lucas Cavallini (7 goals)
- Biggest win: León 0–4 Puebla (28 October 2018)
- Biggest defeat: UANL 6–1 Puebla (10 November 2018)
Home colours	Away colours
- All statistics correct as of 13 January 2019.

The 2018–19 Club Puebla season is the club's 72nd professional season in Mexico's top-flight football league. The season is split into two tournaments—the Torneo Apertura and the Torneo Clausura—each with identical formats and each contested by the same eighteen teams. The club will also play Copa MX.

== Coaching staff ==
Position	Name
Head coach	(Mexico) Enrique Meza
Assistant coaches	(Mexico) Juan Reynoso
Assistant coaches	(Mexico) Marco Trejo
Assistant coaches	(Mexico) Octavio Becerril
Fitness coach	(Uruguay) Mario Mendaña
Doctor	(Mexico) Gerardo Toledo
Medical assistant	(Mexico) Hugo García

== Players ==
=== Squad information ===
No.	Pos.	Nat.	Name	Date of birth (age)	Signed in	Previous club
Goalkeepers
1	GK	(Mexico)	Jesús Rodríguez	21 May 1993 (age 32)	2018	(Mexico) Youth System
13	GK	(Mexico)	Tirso Trueba	11 June 1996 (age 29)	2018	(Mexico) Youth System
28	GK	(Mexico)	Santiago Ramírez	16 February 1997 (age 29)	2018	(Mexico) Youth System
34	GK	(Uruguay)	Nicolás Vikonis	6 April 1984 (age 42)	2017	(Colombia) Millonarios
Defenders
2	DF	(Colombia)	Brayan Angulo	2 November 1989 (age 36)	2017	(Mexico) Chiapas
5	DF	(Mexico)	Daniel Arreola	8 October 1985 (age 40)	2018	(Mexico) Atlas
14	DF	(Mexico)	Erik Pimentel	15 May 1990 (age 35)	2017	(Mexico) Atlante
16	DF	(Mexico)	Gerardo Rodríguez	16 April 1986 (age 40)	2019 (Winter)	(Mexico) Toluca
17	DF	(Mexico)	Alonso Zamora	7 November 1991 (age 34)	2017 (Winter)	(Mexico) Juárez
26	DF	(Uruguay)	José Pallas	5 January 1983 (age 43)	2018	(Paraguay) Cerro Porteño
300	DF	(Mexico)	Vladimir Loroña	16 November 1998 (age 27)	2018	(Mexico) Youth System
Midfielders
3	MF	(Bolivia)	Alejandro Chumacero	22 April 1991 (age 35)	2018	(Bolivia) The Strongest
7	MF	(Mexico)	Pablo González	7 July 1992 (age 33)	2018	(Mexico) Tapachula
8	MF	(Mexico)	Francisco Acuña	19 January 1988 (age 38)	2017	(Mexico) BUAP
10	MF	(Mexico)	Jonathan Espericueta	9 August 1994 (age 31)	2018	(Mexico) Atlético San Luis
18	MF	(Mexico)	Luis Robles	22 September 1986 (age 39)	2018	(Mexico) Atlas
21	MF	(Mexico)	José Guerrero (Captain)	18 November 1987 (age 38)	2017	(Mexico) América
23	MF	(United States)	José Francisco Torres	29 October 1987 (age 38)	2018	(Mexico) UANL
24	MF	(Mexico)	José María Rodríguez	20 November 1997 (age 28)	2018	(Mexico) Youth System
27	MF	(Mexico)	Alan Acosta	19 December 1996 (age 29)	2019 (Winter)	(Mexico) UNAM
29	MF	(Mexico)	David Aymerich	20 May 1995 (age 30)	2018	(Mexico) Youth System
30	MF	(Mexico)	Jesús Zavala	21 July 1987 (age 38)	2019 (Winter)	(Mexico) Zacatecas
Forwards
9	FW	(Canada)	Lucas Cavallini	28 December 1992 (age 33)	2017	(Uruguay) Peñarol
11	FW	(Uruguay)	Christian Tabó	23 November 1993 (age 32)	2017	(Uruguay) Nacional
12	FW	(Colombia)	Félix Micolta	30 November 1989 (age 36)	2018	(Colombia) América de Cali
19	FW	(Mexico)	Pedro Goulart	29 August 1997 (age 28)	2018	(Mexico) Youth System
20	FW	(Argentina)	Pablo Gómez	16 July 1997 (age 28)	2018	(Mexico) Youth System
22	FW	(Colombia)	Omar Fernández	11 February 1993 (age 33)	2017	(Peru) Melgar
25	FW	(Mexico)	Santiago Ormeño	4 February 1994 (age 32)	2018	(Mexico) BUAP
31	FW	(Uruguay)	Cristian Palacios	2 September 1990 (age 35)	2018	(Uruguay) Peñarol
32	FW	(Argentina)	Matías Alustiza	31 May 1984 (age 41)	2019 (Winter)	(Mexico) UNAM

Players and squad numbers last updated on 6 January 2019.
Note: Flags indicate national team as has been defined under FIFA eligibility rules. Players may hold more than one non-FIFA nationality.

== Competitions ==
=== Overview ===
Competition	First match	Last match	Starting round	Final position	Record							
Competition	First match	Last match	Starting round	Final position	Pld	W	D	L	GF	GA	GD	Win %
Torneo Apertura	21 July 2018	23 November 2018	Matchday 1	12th	17	5	5	7	23	30	−7	29.41
Apertura Copa MX	25 July 2018	5 September 2018	Group stage	Round of 16	5	2	1	2	4	7	−3	40.00
Torneo Clausura	4 January 2019	4 May 2019	Matchday 1	10th	17	6	6	5	18	21	−3	35.29
Clausura Copa MX	9 January 2019	26 February 2019	Group stage	Round of 16	5	1	2	2	8	9	−1	20.00
Total					44	14	14	16	53	67	−14	31.82

Last updated: 26 May 2019
Source: Mediotiempo.com

=== Torneo Apertura ===
==== League table ====
Pos	Team	Pld	W	D	L	GF	GA	GD	Pts
10	Pachuca	17	6	6	5	26	18	+8	24
11	Guadalajara	17	5	5	7	21	22	−1	20
12	Puebla	17	5	5	7	23	30	−7	20
13	BUAP	17	5	4	8	21	25	−4	19
14	León	17	5	3	9	18	23	−5	18

Source: Liga MX
Rules for classification: 1) Points; 2) Goal difference; 3) Number of goals scored; 4) Head-to-head results between tied teams; 5) Number of goals scored away; 6) Highest relegation coefficient; 7) Fair Play points

==== Matches ====
20 July 2018 1	Cruz Azul	3–0	Puebla	Mexico City
17:00	Rentería 81'; Caraglio 90+2'; Hernández 90+3'	Report		Stadium: Estadio Azteca; Referee: Roberto Ríos Jácome

27 July 2018 2	Puebla	2–1	Toluca	Puebla City
21:00	Arreola 12'; Torres 32'	Report	Sambueza 38'	Stadium: Cuauhtémoc; Attendance: 14,326; Referee: Jorge Antonio Pérez Durán

6 August 2018 3	Santos Laguna	2–0	Puebla	Torreón
18:30	Furch 33'; Orrantia 50'	Report		Stadium: Estadio Corona; Referee: Francisco Chacón

10 August 2018 4	Puebla	1–2	Veracruz	Puebla City
21:00	Rivas 52' (o.g.)	Report	Menéndez 82', 84'	Stadium: Estadio Cuauhtémoc; Attendance: 10,998; Referee: Erick Yair Miranda

18 August 2018 5	Necaxa	2–2	Puebla	Aguascalientes City
21:00	Dávila 57'; Villalpando 68'	Report	Cavallini 5'; Chumacero 46'	Stadium: Estadio Victoria; Referee: Fernando Hernández Gómez

21 August 2018 6	Puebla	2–0	Atlas	Puebla City
21:00	Chumacero 20'; Arreola 70'	Report		Stadium: Estadio Cuauhtémoc; Attendance: 10,580; Referee: Eduardo Galván Basulto

25 August 2018 7	Pachuca	2–0	Puebla	Pachuca
17:00	Guzmán 46'; Gutiérrez 76'	Report		Stadium: Estadio Hidalgo; Referee: Roberto García Orozco

31 August 2018 8	Puebla	2–1	Monterrey	Puebla City
21:00	Tabó 68'; Cavallini 90+3'	Report	Madrigal 41'	Stadium: Estadio Cuauhtémoc; Attendance: 9,550; Referee: Fernando Guerrero

15 September 2018 9	Querétaro	0–1	Puebla	Querétaro City
17:00		Report	Loroña 49'	Stadium: Estadio Corregidora; Referee: Diego Montaño

21 September 2018 10	Puebla	2–3	América	Puebla City
21:00	Cavallini 42'; Arreola 59'	Report	Domínguez 8'; Peralta 44'; Valdez 90+4'	Stadium: Estadio Cuauhtémoc; Attendance: 22,234; Referee: Luis Enrique Santander

30 September 2018 11	UNAM	2–2	Puebla	Mexico City
12:00	Mendoza 5'; Mora 13'	Report	Cavallini 58'; Mendoza 80' (o.g.)	Stadium: Estadio Olímpico Universitario; Attendance: 18,630; Referee: Eduardo Galván Basulto

7 October 2018 12	Puebla	2–2	BUAP	Puebla City
21:00	Espericueta 48'; Cavallini 51'	Report	Ramos 38'; Chirinos 81'	Stadium: Estadio Cuauhtémoc; Attendance: 22,109; Referee: César Arturo Ramos

21 October 2018 13	Morelia	2–0	Puebla	Morelia
18:00	Vegas 56'; Sansores 60'	Report		Stadium: Estadio Morelos; Referee: Oscar Macías

28 October 2018 14	León	0–4	Puebla	León
19:00		Report	Tabó 8', 32'; Micolta 66'; Acuña 90'	Stadium: Estadio León; Referee: Jorge Isaac Rojas

2 November 2018 15	Puebla	2–2	Guadalajara	Puebla City
21:00	Robles 49'; Arreola 59'	Report	Pulido 5'; Pereira 10'	Stadium: Estadio Cuauhtémoc; Attendance: 14,276; Referee: Diego Montaño

10 November 2018 16	UANL	6–1	Puebla	San Nicolás de los Garza
19:00	Gignac 20', 44', 48', 64'; Vargas 37', 45'	Report	Cavallini 17'	Stadium: Universitario; Attendance: 38,141; Referee: Oscar Mejía

23 November 2018 17	Puebla	0–0	Tijuana	Puebla City
21:00		Report		Stadium: Estadio Cuauhtémoc; Attendance: 6,628; Referee: Oscar Macías

=== Apertura Copa MX ===
==== Group stage ====
Pos	Team	Pld	W	D	L	GF	GA	GD	Pts	Qualification
1	Monterrey	4	3	1	0	9	4	+5	10	Advance to knockout stage
2	Puebla	4	2	1	1	4	3	+1	7	Advance to knockout stage
3	Venados	4	0	0	4	2	8	−6	0	

Source: Copa MX
Rules for classification: Tiebreakers

25 July 2018 1	Puebla	1–0	Venados	Puebla City
19:00	Acuña 44'	Report		Stadium: Estadio Cuauhtémoc; Attendance: 3,451; Referee: Jonathan Hernández

1 August 2018 2	Monterrey	2–1	Puebla	Guadalupe
21:00	Madrigal 19'; Lajud 20'	Report	Pedro 84'	Stadium: Estadio BBVA Bancomer; Attendance: 26,040; Referee: Alejandro Funk

14 August 2018 3	Puebla	1–1	Monterrey	Puebla City
21:00	Palacios 84'	Report	Lajud 22'	Stadium: Estadio Cuauhtémoc; Attendance: 4,538; Referee: Jorge Isaac Rojas

4 September 2018 4	Venados	0–1	Puebla	Mérida
21:00		Report	Palacios 60'	Stadium: Estadio Carlos Iturralde; Attendance: 3,006; Referee: Luis Daniel Chávez

==== Knockout phase ====
===== Round of 16 =====
26 September 2018	UANL	4–0	Puebla	San Nicolás de los Garza
19:00	Damm 16'; Valencia 21'; Vargas 35'; Quiñones 58'	Report		Stadium: Universitario; Attendance: 24,648; Referee: Edgar Ulises Rangel

=== Torneo Clausura ===
==== League table ====
Pos	Team	Pld	W	D	L	GF	GA	GD	Pts	Qualification or relegation
8	Tijuana	17	9	1	7	25	20	+5	28	Advance to Liguilla (Note: The first 8 places in the table qualified for the Liguilla.)
9	Toluca	17	7	4	6	28	23	+5	25	
10	Puebla	17	6	6	5	18	21	−3	24	
11	Santos Laguna	17	6	4	7	21	23	−2	22	
12	BUAP	17	6	2	9	17	34	−17	20	

Source: Liga MX
Rules for classification: 1) Points; 2) Goal difference; 3) Number of goals scored; 4) Head-to-head results between tied teams; 5) Number of goals scored away; 6) Highest relegation coefficient; 7) Fair Play points

==== Results summary ====
Overall								Home						Away					
Pld	W	D	L	GF	GA	GD	Pts	W	D	L	GF	GA	GD	W	D	L	GF	GA	GD
2	0	1	1	1	3	−2	1	0	1	0	1	1	0	0	0	1	0	2	−2

Last updated: 13 January 2019.
Source: LigaMX

==== Result round by round ====
Round	1	2	3	4	5	6	7	8	9	10	11	12	13	14	15	16	17
Ground	H	A	H	A	H	A	H	A	H	A	H	A	H	H	A	H	A
Result	D	L															
Position	8	14															

Updated to match(es) played on 13 January 2019. Source: LigaMX
A = Away; H = Home; W = Win; D = Draw; L = Loss

==== Matches ====
4 January 2018 1	Puebla	1–1	Cruz Azul	Puebla City
21:05	Cavallini 28'	Report	Hernández 24'	Stadium: Estadio Cuauhtémoc; Attendance: 22,777; Referee: Édgar Ulises Rangel

13 January 2019 2	Toluca	2–0	Puebla	Toluca
12:00	García 42'; Canelo 80'	Report		Stadium: Estadio Nemesio Díez; Attendance: 12,242; Referee: Diego Montaño

18 January 2019 3	Puebla	1–1	Santos Laguna	Puebla City
21:05	González 20'; Cavallini (yellow card) 45+6'; González (yellow card) 90+5'	Report	Correa 26'; Furch (penalty missed) 45+7'	Stadium: Estadio Cuauhtémoc; Attendance: 14,050; Referee: Fernando Hernández Gómez

25 January 2019 4	Veracruz	0–1	Puebla	Veracruz
19:00 CST	López (red card); Paganoni (yellow card) 78'	Report	Loroña (yellow card) 27'; Cavallini 37'; Tabó (yellow card) 44'	Stadium: Estadio Luis "Pirata" Fuente; Referee: Oscar Macías Romo

1 February 2019 5	Puebla	1–4	Necaxa	Puebla City
21:00	Loroña 7'; Arreola (yellow card) 50'; Cavallini (yellow card) 66' (yellow-red card) 90'; Tabó (yellow card) 90'	Report	Sepúlveda 12'; Fernández 37', 48'; Guzmán (yellow card) 42'; Contreras (yellow card) 58'; Alvarado (yellow card) 85'; Castro 90+6'	Stadium: Estadio Cuauhtémoc; Referee: Roberto Rios Jácome

8 February 2019 6	Atlas	1–2	Puebla	Guadalajara
21:00	Isijara 15'; Barceló (yellow card) 30'; Burbano (yellow card) 64'	Report	Zavala (yellow card) 2'; Tabó 37'; Vikonis (yellow card) 66'; Alustiza 88', (yellow card) 89'; Arreola (yellow card) 90'	Stadium: Estadio Jalisco; Referee: Erick Yair Miranda Galindo

15 February 2019 7	Puebla	1–1	Pachuca	Puebla City
21:00	Arreola (yellow card) 37'; Alustiza (yellow card) 49', (goal) 90+2'	Report	Barreiro (yellow card) 9'; Jara 31'	Stadium: Estadio Cuauhtémoc; Referee: Oscar Mejia Garcia

23 February 2019 8	Monterrey	0–0	Puebla	Guadalupe
19:00	Gallardo (yellow card) 82'; Meza (yellow card) 90'	Report	Arreola (yellow card) 27'; Acuña (yellow card) 90'	Stadium: Estadio BBVA Bancomer; Attendance: 43,219; Referee: Jorge Antonio Pérez Durán

4 March 2019 9	Puebla	1–0	Querétaro	Puebla City
20:00	Orozco 14'; Cavallini (yellow card) 26'; Angulo (yellow card) 28'; Arreola (yellow card) 75'; Tabó (yellow card) 90'	Report	Da Silva (yellow card) 90'	Stadium: Estadio Cuauhtémoc; Referee: Eduardo Galvan Basulto

9 March 2019 10	América	1–0	Puebla	Mexico City
19:00	Castillo (yellow card) 31'; Córdova 86'	Report	Chumacero (yellow card) 12'; Acosta (yellow card) 44' (yellow-red card) 47'; Loroña (yellow card) 69'; Guerrero (yellow card) 90'	Stadium: Estadio Azteca; Referee: Adonai Escobedo Gonzalez

15 March 2019 11	Puebla	1–0	UNAM	Puebla City
21:00	Cavallini 49'; Vidrio (yellow card) 52'; González (yellow card) 72'; Zavala (yellow card) 82'	Report	Iturbe (yellow card) 32'	Stadium: Estadio Cuauhtémoc; Referee: Marco Antonio Ortiz Nava

31 March 2019 12	BUAP	0–4	Puebla	Puebla City
16:00		Report	Orozco 6' (o.g.); Cavallini 17', 72'; Arreola (yellow card) 25'; Esquivel 36' (o.g.)	Stadium: Estadio Universitario BUAP; Referee: César Arturo Ramos Palazuelos

5 April 2019 13	Puebla	1–1	Morelia	Puebla City
21:00	Goulart (yellow card) 14'; Orozco (yellow card) 21'; Arreola 51'	Report	Osuna 45', (yellow card) 90'	Stadium: Estadio Cuauhtémoc; Referee: Fernando Guerrero Ramírez

12 April 2019 14	Puebla	0–3	León	Puebla City
21:00	Arreola (red card) 44'	Report	Mena 4', (yellow card) 44'; Meneses 24'; Campbell 52'	Stadium: Estadio Cuauhtémoc; Referee: Diego Montaño Robles

20 April 2019 15	Guadalajara	1–3	Puebla	Zapopan
21:00	Angulo 19' (o.g.) van Rankin (yellow card) 54'	Report	Angulo 33', 38'; Alustiza 49'; Zavala (yellow card) 54'	Stadium: Estadio Akron; Referee: Adonai Escobedo Gonzalez

=== Clausura Copa MX ===
==== Group stage ====
Pos	Team	Pld	W	D	L	GF	GA	GD	Pts	Qualification
1	Tampico Madero	1	1	0	0	3	2	+1	3	Advance to knockout stage
2	Juárez	0	0	0	0	0	0	0	0	Possible knockout stage
3	Puebla	1	0	0	1	2	3	−1	0	

Updated to match(es) played on 9 January 2019. Source: Copa MX
Rules for classification: Tiebreakers

9 January 2019 1	Tampico Madero	3–2	Puebla	Tampico/Ciudad Madero
19:00	Márquez 20'; Olvera 50'; João Gabriel 81'	Report	Tabó 61'; Zavala 76'	Stadium: Estadio Tamaulipas; Attendance: 5,667; Referee: Antonio de Jesús Olalde

== Statistics ==
=== Goals ===
As of 13 January 2019

Rank	Player	Position	Apertura	Ap. Copa MX	Clausura	Cl. Copa MX	Total
1	(Canada) Lucas Cavallini	FW	6	0	1	0	7
2	(Mexico) Daniel Arreola	DF	4	0	0	0	4
2	(Uruguay) Christian Tabó	FW	3	0	0	1	4
4	(Mexico) Francisco Acuña	MF	1	1	0	0	2
4	(Bolivia) Alejandro Chumacero	MF	2	0	0	0	2
4	(Uruguay) Cristian Palacios	FW	0	2	0	0	2
7	(Mexico) Jonathan Espericueta	MF	1	0	0	0	1
7	(Mexico) Pedro Goulart	FW	0	1	0	0	1
7	(Mexico) Vladimir Loroña	DF	0	1	0	0	1
7	(Colombia) Félix Micolta	FW	1	0	0	0	1
7	(Mexico) Luis Robles	MF	1	0	0	0	1
7	(United States) José Francisco Torres	MF	1	0	0	0	1
7	(Mexico) Jesús Zavala	MF	0	0	0	1	1
Total			19	5	1	2	27

=== Clean sheets ===
As of 13 January 2019

Rank	Name	Apertura	Ap. Copa MX	Clausura	Cl.Copa MX	Total
1	(Uruguay) Nicolás Vikonis	4	1	0	0	5
2	(Mexico) Jesús Rodríguez	0	1	0	0	1
Total		4	2	0	0	6

=== Attendance ===
Puebla's Home Attendance by round, Estadio Cuauhtémoc has a capacity of 51,726.

round	Rival	Attendance	Percentage
2	Toluca FC	14,326	
4	Veracruz	10,998	
6	Atlas	10,580	
8	C.F. Monterrey	9,550	
10	Club America	22,234	
12	Lobos BUAP	22,109	
15	C.D. Guadalajara	14,276	
17	Club Tijuana	6,628	
