= 2019–20 Club Puebla season =

Puebla
2019–20 season
- Manager: José Luis Sánchez Solá (until 17 August); Juan Reynoso (from 26 August)
- Stadium: Estadio Cuauhtémoc
- Apertura: 17th
- Top goalscorer: League: Christian Tabó (1 goal); All: Christian Tabó (1 goal)
- Highest home attendance: 27,611 (vs Guadalajara, 2 August 2019)
- Lowest home attendance: 12,544 (vs Juárez, 29 August 2019)
- Average home league attendance: 14,988
- Biggest win: Puebla 2–1 Juárez (29 August 2019)
- Biggest defeat: Puebla 0–4 Pachuca (16 August 2019)
Home colours	Away colours
- All statistics correct as of 17 September 2019.

The 2019–20 Club Puebla season is the 73rd season in the football club's history and the 12th consecutive season in the top flight of Mexican football. The club this season will compete in the Apertura and Clausura tournaments as well as in the Copa MX.

== Coaching staff ==
Position	Name
Head coach	(Mexico) José Luis Sánchez Solá
Assistant coaches	(Mexico) Octavio Becerril
Assistant coaches	(Mexico) Oscar Velázquez
Fitness coach	(Argentina) Gustavo Leombruno
Doctor	(Mexico) Gerardo Toledo
Medical assistant	(Mexico) Hugo García

== Players ==
=== Squad information ===
No.	Pos.	Nat.	Name	Date of birth (age)	Signed in	Previous club
Goalkeepers
1	GK	(Mexico)	Jesús Rodríguez	21 May 1993 (aged 26)	2018	(Mexico) Youth System
34	GK	(Uruguay)	Nicolás Vikonis	6 April 1984 (aged 35)	2017	(Colombia) Millonarios
Defenders
2	DF	(Colombia)	Brayan Angulo	2 November 1989 (aged 29)	2017	(Mexico) Chiapas
4	DF	(Bolivia)	Luis Haquin	15 November 1997 (aged 21)	2019 (Winter)	(Bolivia) Oriente Petrolero
5	DF	(Mexico)	Daniel Arreola	8 October 1985 (aged 33)	2018	(Mexico) Atlas
16	DF	(Mexico)	Gerardo Rodríguez	16 April 1986 (aged 33)	2019 (Winter)	(Mexico) Toluca
23	DF	(Mexico)	Alonso Zamora	7 November 1991 (aged 27)	2017 (Winter)	(Mexico) Juárez
26	DF	(Uruguay)	José Pallas	5 January 1983 (aged 36)	2018	(Paraguay) Cerro Porteño
33	DF	(Mexico)	Néstor Vidrio	22 March 1989 (aged 30)	2019 (Winter)	(Mexico) UdeG
Midfielders
3	MF	(Bolivia)	Alejandro Chumacero	22 April 1991 (aged 28)	2018	(Bolivia) The Strongest
7	MF	(Mexico)	Pablo González	7 July 1992 (aged 27)	2018	(Mexico) Tapachula
15	MF	(Mexico)	Jonathan Espericueta	9 August 1994 (aged 24)	2018	(Mexico) Atlético San Luis
17	MF	(Mexico)	Jesús Zavala	22 March 1989 (aged 30)	2019 (Winter)	(Mexico) Zacatecas
24	MF	(Mexico)	Francisco Acuña	19 January 1988 (aged 31)	2017	(Mexico) BUAP
27	MF	(Mexico)	Alan Acosta	19 December 1996 (aged 22)	2019 (Winter)	(Mexico) UNAM
Forwards
9	FW	(Canada)	Lucas Cavallini	28 December 1992 (aged 26)	2017	(Uruguay) Peñarol
10	FW	(Uruguay)	Christian Tabó	23 November 1993 (aged 25)	2017	(Uruguay) Nacional
11	FW	(Argentina)	Matías Alustiza	31 May 1984 (aged 35)	2019 (Winter)	(Mexico) UNAM
22	FW	(Colombia)	Omar Fernández	11 February 1993 (aged 26)	2017	(Peru) Melgar

Players and squad numbers last updated on 19 July 2019.
Note: Flags indicate national team as has been defined under FIFA eligibility rules. Players may hold more than one non-FIFA nationality.

== Transfers ==
=== Out ===
N	Pos.	Nat.	Name	Age	Moving to	Type	Transfer window	Source
300	DF	(Mexico)	Vladimir Loroña	16 November 1998 (aged 20)	Tijuana	Transfer	Summer	

== Competitions ==
=== Overview ===
Competition	First match	Last match	Starting round	Record							
Competition	First match	Last match	Starting round	Pld	W	D	L	GF	GA	GD	Win %
Torneo Apertura	19 July 2019		Matchday 1	8	1	3	4	8	18	−10	12.50
Copa MX			Group stage	0	0	0	0	0	0	+0	—
Torneo Clausura			Matchday 1	0	0	0	0	0	0	+0	—
Total				8	1	3	4	8	18	−10	12.50

Last updated: 17 September 2019
Source: Mediotiempo.com

=== Torneo Apertura ===
==== League table ====
Pos	Team	Pld	W	D	L	GF	GA	GD	Pts	Qualification or relegation
15	Atlético San Luis	18	6	2	10	22	31	−9	20	
16	Juárez	18	5	3	10	17	27	−10	18	
17	Toluca	18	4	5	9	16	26	−10	17	
18	Puebla	18	4	5	9	20	31	−11	17	
19	Veracruz (Note: Veracuz were disaffiliated by the Mexican Football Federation following various financial problems and incidents off the field. As a result, no club was relegated after the Clausura 2020. Relegation was originally intended to resume at the end of the 2020–21 season, however it was suspended for at least five years after the Ascenso MX was folded.) (D)	18	1	5	12	11	45	−34	8	Team disaffiliated by the FMF

Source: Liga MX
Rules for classification: 1) Points; 2) Goal difference; 3) Number of goals scored; 4) Head-to-head results between tied teams; 5) Number of goals scored away; 6) Highest relegation coefficient; 7) Fair Play points
(D) Disaffiliated

==== Results summary ====
Overall								Home						Away					
Pld	W	D	L	GF	GA	GD	Pts	W	D	L	GF	GA	GD	W	D	L	GF	GA	GD
8	1	3	4	8	18	−10	6	1	1	3	5	12	−7	0	2	1	3	6	−3

Last updated: 17 September 2019.
Source: LigaMX

==== Result round by round ====
Round	1	2	3	4	5	6	7	8	9	10	11	12	13	14	15	16	17
Ground	H	†	H	A	H	A	H	A	H	H	A	H	A	H	A	H	A
Result	L	†	D	L	L	D	W	D	L								
Position	16	16	16	17	18	18	17	17	17								

Updated to match(es) played on 17 September 2019. Source: Mediotiempo.com
A = Away; H = Home; W = Win; D = Draw; L = Loss
Notes: † indicates team rested that round

==== Matches ====
19 July 2019 1	Puebla	1–3	Tijuana	Puebla
19:00	Tabó 14'	Report	Camacho 24'; Nahuelpan 77'; Sepúlveda 90+3'	Stadium: Estadio Cuauhtémoc; Attendance: 15,080; Referee: Luis Enrique Santander

2 August 2019 3	Puebla	1–1	Guadalajara	Puebla
19:00	Cavallini 43'	Report	Alanís 8'	Stadium: Estadio Cuauhtémoc; Attendance: 27,611; Referee: Marco Antonio Ortiz Nava

11 August 2019 4	Santos Laguna	4–1	Puebla	Torreón
18:45	Rivas 14'; Furch 28', 47'; Rivas 88'	Report	Alustiza 44'	Stadium: Estadio Corona; Attendance: 22,432; Referee: Diego Montaño

16 August 2019 5	Puebla	0–4	Pachuca	Puebla
19:00		Report	Guzmán 6'; Hernández 45+5'; Ibarra 54'; Chávez 75'	Stadium: Estadio Cuauhtémoc; Attendance: 14,524; Referee: Oscar Macías

24 August 2019 6	Cruz Azul	1–1	Puebla	Mexico City
19:00	Hernández 60'	Report	Fernández 74'	Stadium: Estadio Azteca; Attendance: 11,867; Referee: Erick Yair Miranda

29 August 2019 7	Puebla	2–1	Juárez	Puebla
19:00	Alustiza 71'; Cavallini 90+1'	Report	Lezcano 44'	Stadium: Estadio Cuauhtémoc; Attendance: 12,544; Referee: Oscar Mejía

1 September 2019 8	Querétaro	1–1	Puebla	Querétaro City
17:00	Castillo 30'	Report	González 89'	Stadium: Estadio Corregidora; Attendance: 19,364; Referee: Marco Antonio Ortiz Nava

13 September 2019 9	Puebla	1–3	Atlético San Luis	Puebla
19:00	Arreola 42'	Report	Ibáñez 1'; Benítez 20'; Berterame 90+2'	Stadium: Estadio Cuauhtémoc; Attendance: 12,544; Referee: José Alfredo Peñaloza

== Copa MX ==
=== Group stage ===
Pos	Team	Pld	W	D	L	GF	GA	GD	Pts	Qualification
1	Morelia	4	4	0	0	5	0	+5	12	Advance to knockout stage
2	Puebla	2	0	0	2	0	2	−2	0	Possible knockout stage
3	Sonora	2	0	0	2	0	3	−3	0	

Source: Copa MX
Rules for classification: Tiebreakers

6 August 2019 1	Morelia	1–0	Puebla	Morelia
21:00	Mendoza 31'	Report		Stadium: Estadio Morelos; Attendance: 10,656; Referee: Jorge Isaac Rojas

== Statistics ==
=== Squad statistics ===
No.	Pos	Nat	Player	Total		Apertura		Copa MX		Clausura	
No.	Pos	Nat	Player	Apps	Goals	Apps	Goals	Apps	Goals	Apps	Goals
1	GK	(Mexico)	Jesús Rodríguez	1	0	0	0	1	0	0	0
2	DF	(Colombia)	Brayan Angulo	8	0	8	0	0	0	0	0
3	MF	(Bolivia)	Alejandro Chumacero	5	0	5	0	0	0	0	0
5	DF	(Mexico)	Daniel Arreola	6	1	6	1	0	0	0	0
6	MF	(Mexico)	Daniel Lajud	1	0	0	0	1	0	0	0
7	MF	(Mexico)	Pablo González	7	1	7	1	0	0	0	0
8	MF	(Mexico)	Rodolfo Salinas	5	0	4	0	1	0	0	0
9	FW	(Canada)	Lucas Cavallini	7	2	7	2	0	0	0	0
10	FW	(Uruguay)	Christian Tabó	9	1	8	1	1	0	0	0
11	FW	(Argentina)	Matías Alustiza	8	2	7	2	1	0	0	0
16	DF	(Mexico)	Carlos Gerardo Rodríguez	3	0	2	0	1	0	0	0
17	MF	(Mexico)	Jesús Zavala	7	0	7	0	0	0	0	0
18	MF	(Colombia)	Christian Marrugo	9	0	8	0	1	0	0	0
20	FW	(Mexico)	Diego Abella	4	0	4	0	0	0	0	0
21	MF	(Mexico)	Jorge Zárate	3	0	2	0	1	0	0	0
22	FW	(Colombia)	Omar Fernández	8	1	8	1	0	0	0	0
23	DF	(Mexico)	Alonso Zamora	3	0	2	0	1	0	0	0
24	MF	(Mexico)	Francisco Acuña	2	0	1	0	1	0	0	0
25	DF	(Uruguay)	Maximiliano Perg	5	0	4	0	1	0	0	0
27	MF	(Mexico)	Alan Acosta	6	0	5	0	1	0	0	0
33	DF	(Mexico)	Néstor Vidrio	8	0	8	0	0	0	0	0
34	GK	(Uruguay)	Nicolás Vikonis	8	0	8	0	0	0	0	0
187	DF	(Mexico)	Ivo Vázquez	1	0	0	0	1	0	0	0
191	MF	(Mexico)	Antonio Soto	1	0	0	0	1	0	0	0

Last updated: 17 September 2019
Source: Mediotiempo.com

=== Goals ===
As of 17 September 2019

Rank	Player	Position	Apertura	Copa MX	Clausura	Total
1	(Argentina) Matías Alustiza	FW	2	0	0	2
1	(Canada) Lucas Cavallini	FW	2	0	0	2
3	(Mexico) Daniel Arreola	DF	1	0	0	1
3	(Colombia) Omar Fernández	FW	1	0	0	1
3	(Mexico) Pablo González	MF	1	0	0	1
3	(Uruguay) Christian Tabó	FW	1	0	0	1

=== Disciplinary record ===
N	P	Nat.	Name	Apertura			Copa MX			Total			Notes
N	P	Nat.	Name	Yellow card	Second yellow card	Red card	Yellow card	Second yellow card	Red card	Yellow card	Second yellow card	Red card	Notes
9	FW	(Canada)	Lucas Cavallini	4		1				4		1	
24	MF	(Mexico)	Francisco Acuña			1						1	
33	DF	(Mexico)	Néstor Vidrio	3						3			
18	MF	(Colombia)	Christian Marrugo	2						2			
8	MF	(Mexico)	Rodolfo Salinas	1			1			2			
10	FW	(Uruguay)	Christian Tabó	2						2			
3	MF	(Bolivia)	Alejandro Chumacero	1						1			
11	FW	(Argentina)	Matías Alustiza	1						1			
2	DF	(Colombia)	Brayan Angulo	1						1			
17	MF	(Mexico)	Jesús Zavala	1						1			
16	MF	(Mexico)	Carlos Gerardo Rodríguez				1			1			
5	DF	(Mexico)	Daniel Arreola	1						1			

Last updated: 17 September 2019
Source: LigaMX
Only competitive matches
(yellow card) = Number of bookings; (second yellow card) = Number of sending offs after a second yellow card; (red card) = Number of sending offs by a direct red card.
