= 2017–18 Club Puebla season =

Puebla
2017–18 season
- Chairman: Carlos López Domínguez
- Manager: Enrique Meza
- Stadium: Estadio Cuauhtémoc
- Apertura 2017: 15th
- Clausura 2018: 10th
- Apertura 2017 Copa MX: Group Stage
- Top goalscorer: League: Lucas Cavallini (13); All: Lucas Cavallini (13)
- Highest home attendance: 37,499 vs Club America (20 April 2018)
- Lowest home attendance: 13,020 vs Toluca (14 February 2018)
- Average home league attendance: 19,687
Home colours	Away colours

The 2017–18 Puebla F.C. season was the club's 71st professional season in Mexico's top-flight football league. The season is split into two tournaments—the Torneo Apertura and the Torneo Clausura—each with identical formats and each contested by the same eighteen teams. The club also played Copa MX. Rafael García Torres was named the club head coach on June 5, 2017, taking over for sacked coach José Cardozo.

== Players ==
=== First-team squad ===
As of 7 January 2017

Note: Flags indicate national team as defined under FIFA eligibility rules; some limited exceptions apply. Players may hold more than one non-FIFA nationality.

No.	Pos.	Nation	Player
1	GK	MEX	Israel Villaseñor (on loan from Morelia)
2	DF	COL	Brayan Angulo
3	DF	MEX	Carlos Gutiérrez
4	DF	MEX	Luis Venegas
5	DF	MEX	Patricio Araujo
6	MF	URU	Pablo Míguez
7	MF	MEX	Alonso Escoboza (on loan from Tijuana)
8	MF	MEX	Francisco Acuña
9	FW	MEX	Jerónimo Amione
10	FW	COL	Félix Micolta
12	DF	MEX	Óscar Rojas
13	MF	COL	Christian Marrugo
14	DF	MEX	Erik Pimentel (on loan from América)
16	MF	MEX	David Toledo (on loan from Guadalajara)

No.	Pos.	Nation	Player
17	DF	MEX	Alonso Zamora (on loan from UANL)
19	FW	PLE	Carlos Salom
21	MF	MEX	José Guerrero (on loan from América)
22	FW	CAN	Lucas Cavallini (on loan from Peñarol)
23	GK	MEX	Moisés Muñoz (on loan from América)
24	MF	ARG	Jonás Aguirre (on loan from Rosario Central)
27	DF	MEX	Hugo Rodríguez (on loan from Pachuca)
28	MF	MEX	Francisco Torres (on loan from Santos Laguna)
30	GK	MEX	Jesús Rodríguez
31	DF	COL	Jhon Mondragón
32	GK	MEX	Tirso Trueba
33	DF	URU	Pablo Cáceres
34	MF	ARG	Gabriel Esparza (on loan from San Lorenzo)

For recent transfers, see List of Mexican football transfers summer 2017

== Statistics ==
=== Goalscorers ===
No.	Pos.	Nation	Name	Apertura Liga	Clausura Liga	Apertura Copa	Clausura Copa	Total
22	FW	(Canada)	Lucas Cavallini	4	9	0	0	13
13	MF	(Colombia)	Christian Marrugo	2	1	0	0	2
10	MF	(Colombia)	Félix Micolta	2	0	0	0	2
28	MF	(Mexico)	Francisco Javier Torres	2	0	0	2	4
8	MF	(Mexico)	Francisco Acuña	1	2	0	0	3
2	DF	(Colombia)	Brayan Angulo	1	1	0	0	2
7	MF	(Mexico)	Alonso Escoboza	1	0	0	0	1
17	DF	(Mexico)	Alonso Zamora	1	0	0	0	1
6	MF	(Uruguay)	Pablo Míguez	0	0	1	0	1
19	FW	(Argentina)	Carlos Salom	0	0	1	0	1
33	FW	(Bolivia)	Alejandro Chumacero	0	2	0	1	3
27	FW	(Mexico)	Hugo Isaác Rodríguez	0	1	0	0	1
20	FW	(Colombia)	Omar Fernández	0	3	0	0	3
11	MF	(Uruguay)	Christian Tabó	0	1	0	0	1
11	MF	(Mexico)	Luis Gerardo Venegas	0	1	0	0	1
11	MF	(Mexico)	José Daniel Guerrero	0	1	0	0	1
12	MF	(Mexico)	Pablo González Díaz	0	1	0	0	1

=== Attendance ===
Puebla's Home Attendance by round, Estadio Cuahutemoc has a capacity of 51,726.

round	Rival	Attendance	Percentage
2	Morelia	12,067	25.71%
4	Tijuana	8,124	17.32%
6	Club Leon	6,233	13.28%
8	Cruz Azul		
10	Monterrey		
11	Atlas		
13	Querétaro		
15	UNAM		
17	Lobos BUAP		

== Competitions ==
Win Draw Loss

=== Liga MX ===
==== Apertura 2017 ====
===== Results summary =====
Overall								Home						Away					
Pld	W	D	L	GF	GA	GD	Pts	W	D	L	GF	GA	GD	W	D	L	GF	GA	GD
18	4	7	7	14	20	−6	19	2	4	3	10	8	+2	2	3	4	4	12	−8

Last updated: 19 November 2017.
Source: Liga MX

===== Results by round =====
Round	1	2	3	4	5	6	7	8	9	10	11	12	13	14	15	16	17
Ground	A	H	A	H	A	H	A	H	A	H	A	H	H	A	H	A	H
Result	L	D	L	D	W	L	L	D	D	L	D	D	W	L	W	D	L
Position	18	14	16	17	13	16	18	18	18	18	17	17	15	16	15	14	15

Updated to match(es) played on 19 November 2017. Source: Liga MX
A = Away; H = Home; W = Win; D = Draw; L = Loss

===== Matchday =====
July 22, 2017 1	Tigres UANL	5–0	Puebla	San Nicolas, Nuevo León
19:00		Report		Stadium: Estadio Universitario; Attendance: 41,269; Referee: Jorge Antonio Pérez Durán

July 28, 2017 2	Puebla	1–1	Morelia	Puebla City, Puebla
19:00		Report		Stadium: Estadio Cuauhtémoc; Attendance: 12,067; Referee: Oscar Macías Romo

August 6, 2017 3	Veracruz	2–0	Puebla	Veracruz City, Veracruz
18:30		Report		Stadium: Estadio Luis "Pirata" Fuente; Attendance: 14,364; Referee: José Alfredo Peñaloza Soto

August 11, 2017 4	Puebla	1–1	Tijuana	Puebla City, Puebla
19:00		Report		Stadium: Estadio Cuauhtémoc

August 19, 2017 5	Guadalajara	0–1	Puebla	Guadalajara, Jalisco
21:00		Report		Stadium: Estadio Chivas

23 August 2017 6	Puebla	0–1	León	Puebla City, Puebla
19:00		Report		Stadium: Estadio Cuauhtémoc

August 27, 2017 7	Toluca	2–1	Puebla	Toluca, Mexico
12:00		Report		Stadium: Estadio Nemesio Díez; Attendance: 12,584; Referee: Oscar Macías Romo

September 8, 2017 8	Puebla	0–0	Cruz Azul	Puebla City, Puebla
19:00		Report		Stadium: Estadio Cuauhtémoc

September 16, 2017 9	Necaxa	1–1	Puebla	Aguascalientes City, Aguascalientes
21:00		Report		Stadium: Estadio Victoria

September 26, 2017 11	Puebla	1–2	Atlas	Puebla City, Puebla
19:00		Report		Stadium: Estadio Cuauhtémoc

October 1, 2017 12	Santos Laguna	0–0	Puebla	Torreón, Coahuila
18:30		Report		Stadium: Estadio Corona

October 13, 2017 13	Puebla	1–1	Querétaro	Puebla City, Puebla
19:00		Report		Stadium: Estadio Cuauhtémoc

September 22, 2017 10	Puebla	2–0	Monterrey	Puebla City, Puebla
19:00		Report		Stadium: Estadio Cuauhtémoc
Note: Postponed due by the FMF and Liga MX following the 2017 Central Mexico earthquake.

October 21, 2017 14	Pachuca	1–0	Puebla	Pachuca, Hidalgo
19:06		Report		Stadium: Estadio Hidalgo

October 27, 2017 15	Puebla	3–0	UNAM	Puebla City, Puebla
19:00		Report		Stadium: Estadio Cuauhtémoc

November 4, 2017 16	América	1–1	Puebla	Mexico City Mexico
21:00		Report		Stadium: Estadio Azteca

November 17, 2017 17	Puebla	0–1	Lobos BUAP	Puebla City, Puebla
19:00		Report		Stadium: Estadio Cuauhtémoc

=== Copa MX ===
==== Apertura 2017 ====
===== Matches =====
25 July 2017	Puebla	1–0	Atlante	Puebla, Puebla
19:00	Salom 43'	Report		Stadium: Estadio Cuauhtémoc; Attendance: 5,156; Referee: Eduardo Galvan Basulto

1 August 2017	Tijuana	1-0	Puebla	Tijuana, Baja California
19:00	Arriola 7'	Report		Stadium: Estadio Caliente; Attendance: 27,333; Referee: Alejandro Funk Villafañe

August 15, 2016	Puebla	1–1	Tijuana	Puebla, Puebla
21:00	Míguez 43'	Report	Núñez 44'	Stadium: Estadio Cuauhtémoc; Attendance: 2,616; Referee: León Vicente Barajas

September 13, 2017	Atlante	2–0	Puebla	Cancún
19:30	F. Uscanga 35' (pen.); Cardozo 37'	Report		Stadium: Estadio Andrés Quintana Roo; Attendance: 1,409; Referee: Jesús Bisguerra Mendiola

=== Group 4 ===
Pos	Team	Pld	W	D	L	GF	GA	GD	Pts	Qualification
1	Tijuana	4	1	3	0	3	2	+1	6	Advance to knockout stage
2	Atlante	4	1	2	1	3	2	+1	5	Advance to knockout stage
3	Puebla	4	1	1	2	2	4	−2	4	

Source: Copa MX
Rules for classification: Tiebreakers

== Clausura 2018 ==
=== Results summary ===
Overall								Home						Away					
Pld	W	D	L	GF	GA	GD	Pts	W	D	L	GF	GA	GD	W	D	L	GF	GA	GD
18	7	2	9	13	10	+3	23	5	1	3	8	2	+6	2	1	6	5	8	−3

Last updated: 27 December 2017.
Source: Liga MX

=== Matchday ===
January 05, 2018 1	Puebla	2–1	Tigres UANL	Puebla City, Puebla
19:00				Stadium: Estadio Cuauhtémoc

January 12, 2018 2	Morelia	1–0	Puebla	Morelia, Michoacán
19:00				Stadium: Estadio Morelos

August 19, 2018 3	Puebla	2–0	Veracruz	Puebla City, Puebla
19:00				Stadium: Estadio Cuauhtémoc

August 26, 2018 4	Tijuana	2–0	Puebla	Tijuana, Baja California
19:00				Stadium: Estadio Caliente

February 2, 2018 5	Puebla	2–0	Guadalajara	Puebla City, Puebla
19:00				Stadium: Estadio Cuauhtémoc

10 February 2018 6	León	2–1	Puebla	León, Guanajuato
19:00				Stadium: Estadio León

February 14, 2018 7	Puebla	2–0	Toluca	Puebla City, Puebla
19:00				Stadium: Estadio Cuauhtémoc

February 17, 2018 8	Cruz Azul	1–1	Puebla	Benito Juárez, Mexico City
19:00				Stadium: Estadio Azul

February 22, 2018 9	Puebla	1–1	Necaxa	Puebla City, Puebla
21:00				Stadium: Estadio Cuauhtémoc

March 3, 2018 10	Monterrey	1–3	Puebla	Monterrey, Nuevo León
19:00				Stadium: Estadio BBVA Bancomer

March 9, 2018 11	Atlas	1–0	Puebla	Guadalajara, Jalisco
21:00				Stadium: Estadio Jalisco

March 16, 2018 12	Puebla	0–1	Santos Laguna	Puebla City, Puebla
19:00				Stadium: Estadio Cuauhtémoc

March 31, 2018 13	Querétaro	2–1	Puebla	Querétaro City, Queretaro
17:00				Stadium: Estadio Corregidora

April 6, 2018 14	Puebla	2–6	Pachuca	Puebla City, Puebla
19:06				Stadium: Estadio Cuauhtémoc

April 15, 2018 15	UNAM	4–2	Puebla	Coyoacán, Mexico City
19:00				Stadium: Estadio Olímpico Universitario

April 20, 2018 16	Puebla	3–1	América	Puebla City, Puebla
19:00				Stadium: Estadio Cuauhtémoc

April 28, 2018 17	Lobos BUAP	0–1	Puebla	Puebla City, Puebla
17:00				Stadium: Estadio Universitario BUAP

=== Copa MX ===
==== Clausura 2018 ====
===== Matches =====
January 16, 2018	Cruz Azul	1–3	Puebla	Benito Juárez
19:00				Stadium: Estadio Azul

January 23, 2018	Puebla	0-0	Alebrijes de Oaxaca	Puebla, Puebla
21:00				Stadium: Estadio Cuauhtémoc

February 02, 2018	Puebla	0–2	Cruz Azul	Puebla, Puebla
21:00				Stadium: Estadio Cuauhtémoc

February 28, 2018	Alebrijes de Oaxaca	0–0	Puebla	Oaxaca, Oaxaca
19:00				Stadium: Estadio Tecnológico de Oaxaca

=== Group 2 ===
Pos	Team	Pld	W	D	L	GF	GA	GD	Pts	Qualification
1	Oaxaca	2	1	1	0	1	0	+1	4	Advance to knockout stage
2	Puebla	3	1	1	1	3	3	0	4	Possible knockout stage
3	Cruz Azul	3	1	0	2	3	4	−1	3	

Updated to match(es) played on 7 February 2018. Source: Copa MX
Rules for classification: Tiebreakers
