= 2015–16 Tigres UANL season =

Tigres UANL
2015–16 season
- Chairman: Alejandro Rodríguez Michelsen
- Manager: Ricardo Ferretti
- Stadium: Estadio Universitario
- Apertura 2015: 1st (champions)
- Copa MX: Did not enter
- CONCACAF Champions League: Quarter-final
- Top goalscorer: League: André-Pierre Gignac (15); All: André-Pierre Gignac (16)
Home colours	Away colours	Third colours

== Squad ==
As of 2 December 2015

Note: Flags indicate national team as defined under FIFA eligibility rules; some limited exceptions apply. Players may hold more than one non-FIFA nationality.

No.	Pos.	Nation	Player
1	GK	ARG	Nahuel Guzmán
2	DF	MEX	Israel Jiménez
3	DF	BRA	Juninho (Captain)
4	DF	MEX	Hugo Ayala (Vice-captain)
5	FW	PAR	Fernando Fernández
6	DF	MEX	Jorge Torres Nilo
8	MF	ARG	Lucas Zelarayán
9	FW	BRA	Rafael Sóbis
10	FW	FRA	André-Pierre Gignac
11	MF	MEX	Damián Álvarez (3rd captain)
13	DF	MEX	Antonio Briseño
14	DF	MEX	Iván Estrada
15	MF	MEX	Manuel Viniegra
17	FW	CHI	Héctor Mancilla (on loan from Morelia)

No.	Pos.	Nation	Player
18	MF	USA	José Francisco Torres
19	MF	ARG	Guido Pizarro (4th captain)
20	MF	MEX	Javier Aquino
21	GK	MEX	Aarón Fernández
22	GK	MEX	Enrique Palos
23	MF	USA	Luis Silva
24	DF	MEX	José Rivas
25	MF	MEX	Jürgen Damm
29	MF	MEX	Jesús Dueñas
30	GK	MEX	Richard Sánchez
31	MF	MEX	Uvaldo Luna
32	MF	MEX	Genaro Castillo
34	MF	MEX	Jonathan Espericueta

=== Out on loan ===
Note: Flags indicate national team as defined under FIFA eligibility rules; some limited exceptions apply. Players may hold more than one non-FIFA nationality.

No.	Pos.	Nation	Player
—	GK	MEX	Sergio García (loan to Veracruz)
—	GK	MEX	Jesús Urbina (loan to Juárez)
—	GK	MEX	Daniel Vogel (loan to UAT)
—	DF	MEX	Alonso Zamora (loan to Chiapas)
—	DF	MEX	Hugo Rodríguez (loan to Pachuca)
—	DF	COL	Francisco Meza (loan to UNAM)
—	DF	MEX	Nicolás Ruvalcaba (loan to BUAP)
—	DF	MEX	Éder Borelli (loan to Juárez)
—	DF	MEX	Abel Fuentes (loan to Oaxaca)
—	DF	USA	Juan Pablo Ocegueda (loan to Oaxaca)
—	DF	MEX	Abraham Stringel (loan to Sonora)
—	MF	URU	Egidio Arévalo Ríos (loan to Atlas)

No.	Pos.	Nation	Player
—	MF	MEX	Alberto Acosta (loan to Puebla)
—	MF	PER	Christian Cueva (on loan to Toluca)
—	MF	MEX	Gerardo Lugo (loan to Veracruz)
—	MF	MEX	Édgar Pacheco (loan to Juárez)
—	MF	ESA	Alexander Larín (loan to Juárez)
—	MF	MEX	Luis Martínez (loan to Juárez)
—	MF	MEX	Alfonso Tamay (loan to Tapachula)
—	FW	COL	Carlos Ibargüen (loan to Independiente Santa Fe)
—	FW	MEX	Emmanuel Cerda (loan to Murciélagos)
—	FW	COL	Julián Quiñones (loan to Venados)
—	FW	USA	Omar Salgado (loan to Tampa Bay Rowdies)
—	FW	NGR	Ikechukwu Uche (loan to Málaga)

== Transfers ==
=== Summer ===
In: Note: Flags indicate national team as defined under FIFA eligibility rules; some limited exceptions apply. Players may hold more than one non-FIFA nationality.

No.	Pos.	Nation	Player
10	FW	FRA	André-Pierre Gignac (from (France) Marseille)
16	FW	MEX	Enrique Esqueda (on loan from Pachuca, previously on loan)
20	MF	MEX	Javier Aquino (from (Spain) Villarreal)
25	FW	MEX	Jürgen Damm (from Pachuca)
26	DF	MEX	Jairo González (on loan from UdeG)
28	FW	NGR	Ikechukwu Uche (from (Spain) Villarreal)

Out: Note: Flags indicate national team as defined under FIFA eligibility rules; some limited exceptions apply. Players may hold more than one non-FIFA nationality.

No.	Pos.	Nation	Player
10	FW	COL	Darío Burbano (to León)
13	FW	MEX	Darío Carreño (to Chiapas)
18	FW	MEX	Dieter Villalpando (loan return to Pachuca)
27	DF	MEX	Hugo Rodríguez (to Pachuca)
––	GK	MEX	Sergio García (on loan to Veracruz, previously on loan at Chiapas)
––	DF	USA	Jonathan Bornstein (to Querétaro, previously on loan)
––	MF	BRA	Danilinho (to Querétaro, previously on loan)
––	MF	MEX	Alfonso Tamay (on loan to Puebla, previously on loan)
––	MF	MEX	Alberto Acosta (on loan to Puebla, previously on loan)
––	MF	MEX	Edgar Pacheco (on loan to Juárez previously on loan at Querétaro)

=== Winter ===
In: Note: Flags indicate national team as defined under FIFA eligibility rules; some limited exceptions apply. Players may hold more than one non-FIFA nationality.

No.	Pos.	Nation	Player
5	FW	PAR	Fernando Fernández (from (Paraguay) Guaraní)
8	MF	ARG	Lucas Zelarayán (from (Argentina) Belgrano)
17	FW	CHI	Héctor Mancilla (on loan from Morelia)
23	MF	USA	Luis Silva (from (United States) Real Salt Lake)

Out: Note: Flags indicate national team as defined under FIFA eligibility rules; some limited exceptions apply. Players may hold more than one non-FIFA nationality.

No.	Pos.	Nation	Player
5	MF	URU	Egidio Arévalo Ríos (on loan to Atlas)
8	FW	ECU	Joffre Guerrón (to Cruz Azul)
16	FW	MEX	Enrique Esqueda (on loan to Veracruz)
23	MF	MEX	Gerardo Lugo (on loan to Veracruz)
28	FW	NGR	Ikechukwu Uche (on loan to (Spain) Málaga)
30	FW	MEX	Amaury Escoto (on loan to Tapachula)
35	MF	MEX	Alonso Zamora (on loan to Chiapas)
—	DF	COL	Francisco Meza (on loan to UNAM, previously on loan at (Colombia) Santa Fe)
—	FW	ARG	Emanuel Villa (to Querétaro, previously on loan)
—	FW	MEX	Emmanuel Cerda (on loan to Murciélagos)

== Competitions ==
=== Copa Libertadores ===
==== Final stage ====
19 May 2015 Quarterfinal 1st leg	Emelec (Ecuador)	1 – 0	(Mexico) Tigres UANL	Manta, Ecuador
20:00 CDT (UTC−5)	Bolaños 63'	Report	Pizarro (yellow card) 27'; Nilo (yellow card) 69'	Stadium: Estadio Jocay; Attendance: 18,000; Referee: Fernando Rapallini (Argentina)

26 May 2015 Quarterfinal 2nd leg	Tigres UANL (Mexico)	2 – 0 (2 – 1 agg.)	(Ecuador) Emelec	San Nicolás de los Garza, Mexico
20:00 CDT (UTC−5)	Sóbis 5'; Esqueda (yellow card) 70'; Rivas 79'	Report	Bolaños (yellow card) 63'; Guagua (yellow card) 77'	Stadium: Estadio Universitario; Attendance: 42,000; Referee: Enrique Cáceres (Paraguay)

15 July 2015 Semifinal 1st leg	Internacional (Brazil)	2 – 1	(Mexico) Tigres UANL	Porto Alegre, Brazil
20:00 CDT (UTC−5)	D'Alessandro 4'; Valdívia 9'; Geferson (yellow card) 38'; Rodrigo (yellow card) 80'	Report	Jiménez (yellow card) 21'; Ayala 23' (yellow card) 41' (yellow-red card) 58'; Pizarro (yellow card) 45+1'; Juninho (yellow card) 90+1'	Stadium: Estádio Beira-Rio; Referee: José Argote (Venezuela)

22 July 2015 Semifinal 2nd leg	Tigres UANL (Mexico)	3 – 1 (4 – 3 agg.)	(Brazil) Internacional	San Nicolás de los Garza, Mexico
20:00 CDT (UTC−5)	Gignac 17'; Torres (yellow card) 37'; Geferson 40' (o.g.); Arévalo 55'	Report	Rodrigo (yellow card) 54'; Lisandro 88'	Stadium: Estadio Universitario; Referee: Carlos Vera (Ecuador)

===== Final =====
29 July 2015 1st leg	Tigres UANL (Mexico)	0 – 0	(Argentina) River Plate	San Nicolás de los Garza, Mexico
20:00 CDT (UTC−5)	Sóbis (yellow card) 32'; Damm (yellow card) 54'	Report	Vangioni (yellow card) 3'; Mercado (yellow card) 42'; Ponzio (yellow card) 64'	Stadium: Estadio Universitario; Referee: Antonio Arias (Paraguay)

5 August 2015 2nd leg	River Plate (Argentina)	3 – 0 (3 – 0 agg.)	(Mexico) Tigres UANL	Buenos Aires, Argentina
20:00 CDT (UTC−5)	Alario (yellow card) 9' (goal) 45'; Funes Mori (yellow card) 47' (goal) 79'; Cavenaghi (yellow card) 56'; Sánchez 75' (pen.) (yellow card) 75'	Report	Jiménez (yellow card) 17'; Juninho (yellow card) 19'; Gignac (yellow card) 22'; Rivas (yellow card) 25'; Nilo (yellow card) 72'	Stadium: Estadio Antonio Vespucio Liberti; Referee: Darío Ubriaco (Uruguay)

=== Liga MX ===
==== Torneo Apertura ====
===== Results summary =====
Overall								Home						Away					
Pld	W	D	L	GF	GA	GD	Pts	W	D	L	GF	GA	GD	W	D	L	GF	GA	GD
17	8	4	5	26	16	+10	28	4	3	2	18	10	+8	4	1	3	8	6	+2

Last updated: 20 December 2015.
Source: Soccerway

===== Results =====
26 July 2015 1	Tigres UANL	0 – 1	Toluca	San Nicolás de los Garza
19:00 CDT (UTC−5)	González (yellow card) 38'; Zamora (yellow card) 49'; Torres (yellow card) 68'	Report	Triverio 7'; Rodríguez (yellow card) 39'	Stadium: Estadio Universitario; Referee: Erick Yair Miranda Galindo

2 August 2015 2	Morelia	1 – 0	Tigres UANL	Morelia
20:30 CDT (UTC−5)	Velázquez (yellow card) 28'; Pellerano (yellow card) 37'; Zamorano 73'; Villalpando (yellow card) 90+3'	Report	Zamora (yellow card) 76'	Stadium: Estadio Morelos; Referee: Adonai Escobedo González

10 August 2015 3	Tigres UANL	2 – 2	Guadalajara	San Nicolás de los Garza
19:00 CDT (UTC−5)	Briseño 31'; Damm (yellow card) 37'; Gignac 45+2'; Dueñas (red card) 55'; Nilo (yellow card) 90+4'; Guzmán (red card) 90+5'	Report	Castro (yellow card) 17'; Bravo (yellow card) 42'; López (yellow card) 45' (goal) 58'; Vázquez 81'	Stadium: Estadio Universitario; Referee: Francisco Chacón Gutiérrez

13 August 2015 4	León	2 – 1	Tigres UANL	León
20:06 CDT (UTC−5)	Burdisso 23'; Peña 30'; González (yellow card) 90+4'; Martínez (yellow card) 90+4'	Report	Aquino 51'	Stadium: Estadio León; Referee: César Arturo Ramos Palazuelos

16 August 2015 5	Tigres UANL	4 – 1	Chiapas	San Nicolás de los Garza
19:00 CDT (UTC−5)	Gignac 28', 37', 70'; Rivas (yellow card) 36'; Sóbis 54'	Report	Silva (yellow card) 13'; Venegas (yellow card) 22'; Muñoz (yellow card) 49' de la Torre 55'; Romero (yellow card) 61'; Insaurralde (yellow card) 67'	Stadium: Estadio Universitario; Referee: Jorge Isaac Rojas Castillo

22 August 2015 6	Tijuana	1 – 2	Tigres UANL	Tijuana
21:30 CDT (UTC−5)	Moreno (yellow card) 27' (goal) 59'; Salinas (yellow card) 30'; Gandolfi (yellow card) 69'; Núñez (yellow card) 84'	Report	Briseño (yellow card) 33'; Jiménez (yellow card) 42'; Gignac (yellow card) 69'; Rivas 70'; Sóbis (yellow card) 82'; Guerrón 84'	Stadium: Estadio Caliente; Referee: Miguel Ángel Flores Rodríguez

30 August 2015 7	Tigres UANL	5 – 1	Querétaro	San Nicolás de los Garza
19:00 CDT (UTC−5)	Dueñas 18'; Pizarro 24'; Gignac 27'; Sóbis 30'; Juninho (yellow card) 55'; Guerrón 88'	Report	Villa 21' (yellow card) 29'; William (yellow card) 46'; Osuna (yellow card) 76'; Benítez (yellow card) 76'	Stadium: Estadio Universitario; Referee: Roberto Ríos Jácome

12 September 2015 8	América	0 – 1	Tigres UANL	Mexico City
CDT (UTC−5)	Martínez (yellow card) 17'; Sambueza (yellow card) 32' (red card) 42'; Benedetto (red card) 44'; Arroyo (yellow card) 63'; Aguilar (yellow card) 75'; Peralta (yellow card) 80'	Report	Dueñas (yellow card) 17'; Gignac 28' (pen.); Rivas (yellow card) 56'; Damm (red card) 63'	Stadium: Estadio Azteca; Referee: César Arturo Ramos Palazuelos

20 September 2015 9	Tigres UANL	3 – 1	Monterrey	San Nicolás de los Garza
19:00 CDT (UTC−5)	Aquino 54' (yellow card) 57'; Gignac 63'; Sóbis (yellow card) 64'; Rivas 80'	Report	Cardona (yellow card) 15'; Mori 35'; Juárez (red card) 44'; Montes (yellow card) 64'; Gargano (yellow card) 88'	Stadium: Estadio Universitario; Referee: Roberto García Orozco

27 September 2015 10	PUMAS	1 – 0	Tigres UANL	Mexico City
12:00 CDT (UTC−5)	Castro (yellow card) 3'; Sosa 53' (yellow card) 70' van Rankin (yellow card) 62'; Ludueña (yellow card) 87'	Report	Nilo (yellow card) 2'; Gignac (yellow card) 49'; Sóbis (red card) 77'; Guerrón (yellow card) 72' (red card) 78'	Stadium: Estadio Olímpico Universitario; Referee: Jorge Isaac Rojas Castillo

1 October 2015 11	Tigres UANL	0 – 1	Puebla	San Nicolás de los Garza
20:45 CDT (UTC−5)	Pizarro (yellow card) 66'	Report	Rey 25'; Díaz (yellow card) 85'; Bermúdez (yellow card) 90'	Stadium: Estadio Universitario; Referee: Adonai Escobedo González

4 October 2015 12	Atlas	0 – 1	Tigres UANL	Guadalajara
20:30 CDT (UTC−5)	Bergessio (yellow card) 71'; Baloy (yellow card) 76'; Tabó (yellow card) 90'	Report	Nilo (yellow card) 6'; Dueñas (yellow card) 29'; Damm 55'; Rivas (red card) 82'	Stadium: Estadio Jalisco; Referee: Óscar Macías Romo

18 October 2015 13	Tigres UANL	2 – 1	Pachuca	San Nicolás de los Garza
19:00 CDT (UTC−5)	Gignac 10', 49' (yellow card) 63'; Nilo (yellow card) 44'; Damm (yellow card) 56'; Briseño (yellow card) 80'	Report	Jara (yellow card) 29' (goal) 75'; Hernández (yellow card) 37'; Penilla (yellow card) 40'; Pizarro (yellow card) 53'; Botta (yellow card) 73'	Stadium: Estadio Universitario; Referee: Fernando Guerrero Ramírez

25 October 2015 14	Dorados	0 – 0	Tigres UANL	Culiacán
20:00 CST (UTC−6)	Chávez (yellow card) 45'; Lacerda (yellow card) 72'	Report	Pizarro (yellow card) 62'; Guzmán (yellow card) 86'	Stadium: Estadio Banorte; Referee: Jorge Antonio Pérez Durán

1 November 2015 15	Tigres UANL	2 – 2	Santos Laguna	San Nicolás de los Garza
19:00 CST (UTC−6)	Gignac 8'; Arévalo 58'; Pizarro (yellow card) 68'	Report	Abella (yellow card) 13'; Molina (yellow card) 34'; González (yellow card) 41'; Djaniny 70'; Izquierdoz (yellow card) 86'; Calderón (yellow card) 90'; Orozco 90+2'	Stadium: Estadio Universitario; Referee: Erick Yair Miranda Galindo

7 November 2015 16	Veracruz	1 – 3	Tigres UANL	Veracruz
19:30 CST (UTC−6)	Villalva (yellow card) 41'; Noya 51'	Report	Gignac 13'; Aquino 23'; Pizarro (yellow card) 29'; Damm (yellow card) 50'; Sóbis 64'	Stadium: Estadio Luis "Pirata" Fuente; Referee: Francisco Chacón Gutiérrez

22 November 2015 17	Tigres UANL	0 – 0	Cruz Azul	San Nicolás de los Garza
19:00 CST (UTC−6)	Rivas (yellow card) 86'; Gignac (yellow card) 90+2'	Report	Torrado (yellow card) 24'	Stadium: Estadio Universitario; Referee: Eduardo Galván Basulto

===== League table =====
Pos	Team	Pld	W	D	L	GF	GA	GD	Pts	Qualification
3	León (A)	17	10	0	7	32	31	+1	30	Advance to Liguilla (Note: The first 8 places in the table qualify for the Playoffs.)
4	Chiapas (A)	17	8	5	4	31	27	+4	29	Advance to Liguilla
5	UANL (A)	17	8	4	5	26	16	+10	28	Advance to Liguilla and cannot qualify for South American competitions (Note: Clubs cannot qualify to the 2016 Copa Libertadores due to their participation in the 2015–16 CONCACAF Champions League.)
6	América (A)	17	9	1	7	30	21	+9	28	Advance to Liguilla and cannot qualify for South American competitions
7	Puebla (Q, A)	17	8	3	6	22	20	+2	27	2016 Copa Libertadores First Stage, Advances to Liguilla (Note: Winner or Runner-Up of the 2015 Supercopa MX qualifies to the 2016 Copa Libertadores as Mexico 3.)

Updated to match(es) played on 22 November 2015. Source: Medio Tiempo
Rules for classification: 1) Points; 2) Goal difference; 3) Number of goals scored; 4) Head-to-head results between tied teams; 5) Number of goals scored away; 6) Highest relegation coefficient; 7) Fair Play points
(A) Advance to a further round; (Q) Qualified for the phase indicated

===== Liguilla – Apertura =====
25 November 2015 Quarterfinal 1st leg	Tigres UANL	2 – 1	Chiapas	San Nicolás de los Garza
22:00 CDT (UTC−5)	Gignac 21'; Pizarro (yellow card) 53'; Álvarez 84'; Sóbis (yellow card) 88'	Report	de la Torre (yellow card) 18'; Muñoz (yellow card) 37'; Insaurralde 65'; Hurtado (yellow card) 87'; Rodríguez (yellow card) 90+3'	Stadium: Estadio Universitario; Referee: Erick Yair Miranda

28 November 2015 Quarterfinal 2nd leg	Chiapas	0 – 1 (1 – 3 agg.)	Tigres UANL	Tuxtla Gutiérrez
18:00 CST (UTC−6)	Hurtado (yellow card) 31'; Araujo (yellow card) 45+1'; Silva (yellow card) 76'	Report	Gignac 21'; Rivas (yellow card) 37'; Jiménez (yellow card) 45'	Stadium: Estadio Víctor Manuel Reyna; Attendance: Jorge Issac Rojas Castillo

4 December 2015 Semifinal 1st leg	Tigres UANL	0 – 0	Deportivo Toluca	San Nicolás de los Garza
21:00 CST (UTC−6)	Ayala (yellow card) 7'; Rivas (yellow card) 24'; Jiménez (yellow card) 75'; Guzmán (yellow card) 90+3'	Report	Rojas (yellow card) 23'; Ríos (yellow card) 74'; Triverio (yellow card) 90+3'	Stadium: Estadio Universitario; Referee: Luis Enrique Santander Aguirre

7 December 2015 Semifinal 2nd leg	Deportivo Toluca	0 – 2 (0 – 2 agg.)	Tigres UANL	Toluca
18:00 CST (UTC−6)	Rojas (yellow card) 78'; Uribe (yellow card) 80'	Report	Pizarro (yellow card) 67'; Aquino 69'; Álvarez 83'	Stadium: Estadio Nemesio Díez; Referee: Jose Alfredo Peñaloza Soto

11 December 2015 Final 1st leg	Tigres UANL	3 – 0	Pumas	San Nicolás de los Garza
21:00 CST (UTC−6)	Gignac 15' (pen.); Aquino 29'; Sóbis 60'	Report	Britos (yellow card) 49'; Martínez (yellow card) 50'; Sosa (yellow card) 65'; Castro (yellow card) 75'	Stadium: Estadio Universitario; Referee: Jose Alfredo Peñaloza Soto

14 December 2015 Final 2nd leg	Pumas	4 – 1 (a.e.t.) (4 – 4 agg.) (2 – 4 p)	Tigres UANL	Mexico City
20:30 CST (UTC−6)	Castro (yellow card) 15'; Herrera 45' (yellow card) 90' (yellow-red card) 90+1'; Britos 55' (yellow card) 79'; Sosa (yellow card) 60'; Torales 87'; Alcoba 119' (yellow card) 120'	Report	Pizarro (yellow card) 60'; Guzmán (yellow card) 71'; Gignac (yellow card) 71' (goal) 103'; Ayala (yellow card) 90' (yellow-red card) 116'; Jiménez (yellow card) 111'	Stadium: Estadio Olímpico Universitario; Referee: Fernando Guerrero Ramírez
	Penalties
	Martínez (penalty missed); Sosa (penalty scored); Fuentes (penalty scored); Cortés (penalty missed)		Gignac (penalty scored); Juninho (penalty scored); Rivas (penalty scored); Jiménez (penalty scored)

==== Torneo Clausura ====
===== Results summary =====
Overall								Home						Away					
Pld	W	D	L	GF	GA	GD	Pts	W	D	L	GF	GA	GD	W	D	L	GF	GA	GD
17	6	6	5	29	19	+10	24	4	3	1	17	8	+9	2	3	4	12	11	+1

Last updated: 9 May 2016.
Source: Soccerway

===== Results =====
10 January 2016 1	Toluca	1 – 0	Tigres UANL	Toluca
13:00 CDT (UTC−5)	Talavera (yellow card) 28'; Uribe 90+1'	Report	Aquino (yellow card) 52'	Stadium: Estadio Nemesio Díez; Referee: Eduardo Galván Basulto

16 January 2016 2	Tigres UANL	2 – 0	Morelia	San Nicolás de los Garza
20:00 CDT (UTC−5)	Dueñas (yellow card) 69'; Aquino 73'; Gignac 75' (yellow card) 78'; Damm (yellow card) 80'	Report	Pérez (yellow card) 67'; Morales (yellow card) 70'	Stadium: Estadio Universitario; Referee: Fernando Guerrero Ramírez

24 January 2016 3	Guadalajara	2 – 2	Tigres UANL	Zapopan
18:00 CDT (UTC−5)	Pineda 27'; Cisneros 73'; Ponce (yellow card) 81'; Castro (yellow card) 83'	Report	Damm (yellow card) 35'; Aquino (yellow card) 48'; Fernández 56'; Sóbis 58'; Juninho (yellow card) 73'; Torres (yellow card) 79'	Stadium: Estadio Omnilife; Referee: Erick Yair Miranda Galindo

30 January 2016 4	Tigres UANL	3 – 1	León	San Nicolás de los Garza
20:00 CDT (UTC−5)	Gignac 11', 29', 45+1'; Pizarro (yellow card) 16'	Report	Novaretti 19'; Moralez (yellow card) 37'; Cuevas (yellow card) 74'; Navarro (yellow card) 83'; Montes (yellow card) 90+2'	Stadium: Estadio Universitario; Referee: Paul Enrique Delgadillo Haro

5 February 2016 5	Chiapas	1 – 3	Tigres UANL	Tuxtla Gutiérrez
22:00 CDT (UTC−5)	Romero 10'; Paredes (yellow card) 17'; Silva (yellow card) 59' (yellow-red card) 65'; Danilinho (yellow card) 62'; Venegas (red card) 67'	Report	Damm (yellow card) 17'; Pizarro (yellow card) 27'; Dueñas 39'; Gignac 57'; Sóbis (yellow card) 63'; Zelarrayán 84'	Stadium: Estadio Víctor Manuel Reyna; Referee: César Arturo Ramos Palazuelos

13 February 2016 6	Tigres UANL	1 – 2	Tijuana	San Nicolás de los Garza
20:00 CDT (UTC−5)	Sóbis (red card) 45'; Guzmán (yellow card) 45+1'; Gignac (yellow card) 69' (goal) 71'; Jiménez (yellow card) 72'; Pizarro (yellow card) 90+1'	Report	Moreno 43', 61'; Guzmán (yellow card) 68'	Stadium: Estadio Universitario; Referee: José Alfredo Peñaloza Soto

19 February 2016 7	Querétaro	2 – 2	Tigres UANL	Santiago de Querétaro
20:30 CDT (UTC−5)	Forlín 45'; Jiménez 48'; Corona (yellow card) 54'; Candelo (yellow card) 69' (yellow-red card) 80'	Report	Gignac 12'; Damm (yellow card) 24'; Pizarro (yellow card) 44'; Aquino 50' (yellow card) 74'; Guzmán (yellow card) 76'	Stadium: Estadio Corregidora; Referee: Diego Montaño Robles

27 February 2016 8	Tigres UANL	4 – 1	América	San Nicolás de los Garza
20:00 CDT (UTC−5)	Aquino (yellow card) 18'; Jiménez (yellow card) 29'; Álvarez 72'; Juninho 75' (pen.); Gignac 83'; Sóbis 84'	Report	Mares (yellow card) 15'; Aguilar (yellow card) 60' (yellow-red card) 73'; Moreno 69'; William (yellow card) 88' (yellow-red card) 90'	Stadium: Estadio Universitario; Referee: Jorge Isaac Rojas Castillo

6 March 2016 9	Monterrey	1 – 0	Tigres UANL	Guadalupe
20:00 CDT (UTC−5)	Ayoví (yellow card) 24' (yellow-red card) 72'; Juárez 49'; Pabón (yellow card) 68'; Mori (yellow card) 90'	Report	Pizarro (yellow card) 24' (yellow-red card) 90+2'; Jiménez (yellow card) 62'; Torres (yellow card) 90'	Stadium: Estadio BBVA Bancomer; Referee: Fernando Guerrero Ramirez

12 March 2016 10	Tigres UANL	0 – 0	PUMAS	San Nicolás de los Garza
20:00 CDT (UTC−5)		Report	Herrera (yellow card) 44'; Castro (yellow card) 78'; Alcoba (yellow card) 90+4'	Stadium: Estadio Universitario; Referee: Luis Enrique Santander Aguirre

19 March 2016 11	Puebla	0 – 0	Tigres UANL	Puebla
CDT (UTC−5)	Acosta (yellow card) 10'; Robles (yellow card) 15'; Alustiza (yellow card) 68'; Bermúdez (red card) 69'; Toledo (yellow card) 90+3'	Report	Juninho (yellow card) 21'; Sóbis (yellow card) 34'; Rivas (yellow card) 64'; Guzmán (yellow card) 71'	Stadium: Estadio Multiva; Referee: Jose Alfredo Peñaloza Soto

2 April 2016 12	Tigres UANL	2 – 2	Atlas	San Nicolás de los Garza
21:00 CDT (UTC−5)	Gignac 16' (yellow card) 86'; Juninho 23' (pen.); Dueñas (yellow card) 62'	Report	Rodr.Salinas (yellow card) 12'; Rodo.Salinas 51'; Medina 69'; Bergessio (yellow card) 81'; Madueña (yellow card) 83'	Stadium: Estadio Universitario; Referee: César Arturo Ramos Palazuelos

9 April 2016 13	Pachuca	2 – 1	Tigres UANL	Pachuca
20:06 CDT (UTC−5)	Lozano (yellow card) 22'; Guzmán (yellow card) 34'; Jara (yellow card) 55' (goal) 74'; Pizarro (yellow card) 58'; Medina (yellow card) 79'; Ramírez 86'	Report	Sóbis 7'; Gignac (yellow card) 11'; Jiménez (yellow card) 21'; Dueñas (yellow card) 41'; Juninho (yellow card) 46'; Nilo (yellow card) 90'	Stadium: Estadio Hidalgo; Referee: Jorge Isaac Rojas Castillo

17 April 2016 14	Tigres UANL	5 – 2	Dorados	San Nicolás de los Garza
20:00 CDT (UTC−5)	Sóbis 2'; Gignac 9', 48'; Damm 44', 53'; Rivas (yellow card) 87'; Juninho (yellow card) 90'	Report	Morelo 3'; Vidrio (yellow card) 19'; Meza (red card) 31'; González 66' (yellow card) 82'; Salas (yellow card) 86'	Stadium: Estadio Universitario; Referee: Fernando Hernández Gómez

23 April 2016 15	Santos Laguna	2 – 1	Tigres UANL	Torreón
20:00 CDT (UTC−5)	Rabello 29'; Marchesín (yellow card) 45' de Buen (yellow card) 52'; Calderón (yellow card) 74' (goal) 77' (pen.)	Report	Juninho 54' (yellow card) 63'	Stadium: Estadio Corona; Referee: Marco Antonio Ortíz Nava

1 May 2016 16	Tigres UANL	0 – 0	Veracruz	San Nicolás de los Garza
20:00 CDT (UTC−5)	Dueñas (yellow card) 32'; Pizarro (yellow card) 89'	Report	Lugo (yellow card) 39'; Nario (yellow card) 64'; Cervantes (yellow card) 69'; Meneses (yellow card) 90+2'	Stadium: Estadio Universitario; Referee: Luis Enrique Santander Aguirre

7 May 2016 17	Cruz Azul	0 – 3	Tigres UANL	Mexico City
18:00 CDT (UTC−5)	Rojas (yellow card) 17'; Giménez (yellow card) 37'; Rojas (red card) 61'; Benítez (yellow card) 66'	Report	Aquino (yellow card) 13'; Sóbis 15'; Gignac 24', 75'; Dueñas (yellow card) 44'; Guzmán (yellow card) 61'; Jiménez (yellow card) 71'	Stadium: Estadio Azul; Referee: César Arturo Ramos Palazuelos

===== League table =====
Pos	Team	Pld	W	D	L	GF	GA	GD	Pts	Qualification or relegation
6	Morelia (Q)	17	8	4	5	25	24	+1	28	Advance to Liguilla (Note: The first 8 places in the table (excluding the last place team in the relegation table) qualify for the Liguilla.)
7	Santos Laguna (Q)	17	8	3	6	22	20	+2	27	Advance to Liguilla
8	UANL (Q)	17	6	6	5	29	19	+10	24	Advance to Liguilla
9	Cruz Azul	17	5	7	5	25	24	+1	22	
10	UNAM	17	5	7	5	23	24	−1	22	

Updated to match(es) played on 7 May 2016. Source: Medio Tiempo
Rules for classification: 1) Points; 2) Goal difference; 3) Number of goals scored; 4) Head-to-head results between tied teams; 5) Number of goals scored away; 6) Highest relegation coefficient; 7) Fair Play points
(Q) Qualified for the phase indicated

===== Liguilla – Clausura =====
11 May 2016 Quarterfinal 1st leg	Tigres UANL	1 – 3	Monterrey	San Nicolás de los Garza
20:00 CDT (UTC−5)	Sóbis 19'; Torres (yellow card) 31'; Pizarro (yellow card) 61'; Ayala (yellow card) 86'	Report	Sánchez 16'; Ayoví (yellow card) 24'; Pabón 38'; Cardona (yellow card) 49'; Funes Mori (yellow card) 64' (goal) 84'	Stadium: Estadio Universitario; Referee: Luis Enrique Santander Aguirre

14 May 2016 Quarterfinal 2nd leg	Monterrey	1 – 2 (4 – 3 agg.)	Tigres UANL	Guadalupe
20:00 CDT (UTC−5)	Cardona (yellow card) 58'; Montes 70'	Report	Pizarro (yellow card) 9'; Dueñas 11'; Juninho (yellow card) 23' (yellow-red card) 68'; Sóbis 27'; Guzmán (yellow card) 52'; Ayala (yellow card) 54'; Jiménez (yellow card) 69'	Stadium: Estadio BBVA Bancomer; Referee: Francisco Chacón

=== Copa MX ===
Due to participating in the 2015–16 CONCACAF Champions League, Tigres UANL did not take part in the Copa MX

=== CONCACAF Champions League ===
==== Group stage ====
Pos	Team	Pld	W	D	L	GF	GA	GD	Pts	Qualification
1	(Mexico) UANL	4	2	2	0	5	3	+2	8	Knockout stage
2	(Costa Rica) Herediano	4	1	2	1	4	3	+1	5	
3	(El Salvador) Isidro Metapán	4	1	0	3	4	7	−3	3	

Source: CONCACAF
Rules for classification: Group stage tiebreakers

18 August 2015 1	Tigres UANL (Mexico)	2 – 1	(El Salvador) Isidro Metapán	San Nicolás de los Garza, Mexico
20:00 CDT (UTC−5)	Zamora 84', 86'	Report	Rugamas 5'; Orellana (yellow card) 60'	Stadium: Estadio Universitario; Referee: Armando Villarreal (United States)

26 August 2015 2	Herediano (Costa Rica)	1 – 1	(Mexico) Tigres UANL	Heredia, Costa Rica
22:00 CDT (UTC−5)	Hansen 33' (pen.) (yellow card) 35'; Granados (yellow card) 86'	Report	Briseño 14' (yellow card) 33'; Nilo (yellow card) 35'; Álvarez (red card) 49'; Zamora (yellow card) 74'; Guerrón (yellow card) 82'	Stadium: Estadio Eladio Rosabal Cordero; Referee: Jonathan Polanco (Guatemala)

24 September 2015 3	Isidro Metapán (El Salvador)	1 – 2	(Mexico) Tigres UANL	Metapán, El Salvador
22:00 CDT (UTC−5)	Orellana (yellow card) 27'; Flores 35' (pen.); Suárez (yellow card) 67'	Report	Torres 23'; Uche 64'; Guerrón (yellow card) 82'	Stadium: Estadio Jorge Calero Suárez; Referee: Christopher Reid (Belize)

21 October 2015 4	Tigres UANL (Mexico)	0 – 0	(Costa Rica) Herediano	San Nicolás de los Garza, Mexico
20:00 CDT (UTC−5)	Álvarez (yellow card) 44'; Sóbis (yellow card) 62'	Report	Gómez (yellow card) 62'	Stadium: Estadio Universitario; Referee: Ricardo Salazar (United States)

==== Knockout stage ====
24 February 2016 Quarterfinal 1st leg	Tigres UANL (Mexico)	2 – 0	(United States) Real Salt Lake	San Nicolás de los Garza, Mexico
19:00 CST (UTC−6)	Torres (yellow card) 37'; Rivas 67'; Damm 86'; Sóbis (yellow card) 88'; Dueñas (yellow card) 90+4'	Report	Olave (yellow card) 13'	Stadium: Estadio Universitario; Attendance: 34,450; Referee: Yadel Martínez (Cuba)

2 March 2016 Quarterfinal 2nd leg	Real Salt Lake (United States)	1 – 1 (1 – 3 agg.)	(Mexico) Tigres UANL	Sandy, United States
21:00 CDT (UTC−5)	Plata 22'; Beltran (yellow card) 25'; Morales (yellow card) 74'	Report	Gignac (yellow card) 10' (goal) 90+1'; Jiménez (yellow card) 43'	Stadium: Rio Tinto Stadium; Attendance: 20,921; Referee: Jeffrey Solís (Costa Rica)

15 March 2016 Semifinal 1st leg	Querétaro (Mexico)	0 – 0	(Mexico) Tigres UANL	Santiago de Querétaro, Mexico
20:00 CST (UTC−6)	N.Domínguez (yellow card) 46'	Report	Pizarro (yellow card) 63'	Stadium: Estadio Corregidora; Referee: César Arturo Ramos (Mexico)

5 April 2016 Semifinal 2nd leg	Tigres UANL (Mexico)	2 – 0 (2 – 0 agg.)	(Mexico) Querétaro	San Nicolás de los Garza, Mexico
20:00 CDT (UTC−5)	Dueñas (yellow card) 34' (yellow-red card) 71'; Gignac 84', 88'; Sóbis (yellow card) 87'; Viniegra (yellow card) 90+3'	Report	Jiménez (yellow card) 56'	Stadium: Estadio Universitario; Referee: Roberto García (Mexico)

==== Final ====
20 April 2016 1st leg	Tigres UANL (Mexico)	0 – 2	(Mexico) Club América	San Nicolás de los Garza, Mexico
21:45 CDT (UTC−5)	Guzmán (yellow card) 57'	Report	Aguilar (yellow card) 23'; Benedetto 49'; Guerrero (yellow card) 56'; Durán (yellow card) 84'; Martínez 90+3'	Stadium: Estadio Universitario; Referee: Roberto García (Mexico)

27 April 2016 2nd leg	Club América (Mexico)	2 – 1 (4 – 1 agg.)	(Mexico) Tigres UANL	Mexico City, Mexico
21:45 CDT (UTC−5)	Aguilar (yellow card) 43'; Sambueza (yellow card) 43'; Arroyo 68' (yellow card) 69'; Martínez 87' (pen.)	Report	Gignac 39' (yellow card) 43'; Álvarez (yellow card) 45'; Dueñas (yellow card) 77'	Stadium: Estadio Azteca; Referee: Fernando Guerrero (Mexico)

== Squad statistics ==
As of Match played 14 May 2016

=== Appearances and goals ===
No.	Pos	Nat	Player	Total		Liga MX		Clausura Copa MX		Copa Libertadores		Champions League	
No.	Pos	Nat	Player	Apps	Goals	Apps	Goals	Apps	Goals	Apps	Goals	Apps	Goals
1	GK	(Argentina) ARG	Nahuel Guzmán	52	0	39	0	0	0	6	0	7	0
2	DF	(Mexico) MEX	Israel Jiménez	48	0	38	0	0	0	5	0	5	0
3	DF	(Brazil) BRA	Juninho	47	3	37	3	0	0	4	0	6	0
4	DF	(Mexico) MEX	Hugo Ayala	33	1	23	0	0	0	4	1	5+1	0
5	FW	(Paraguay) PAR	Fernando Fernández	12	1	1+9	1	0	0	0	0	0+2	0
6	DF	(Mexico) MEX	Jorge Torres Nilo	40	0	31	0	0	0	4	0	5	0
8	MF	(Argentina) ARG	Lucas Zelarrayán	20	1	4+12	1	0	0	0	0	1+3	0
9	FW	(Brazil) BRA	Rafael Sóbis	49	12	37	11	0	0	6	1	6	0
10	FW	(France) FRA	André-Pierre Gignac	50	33	39	28	0	0	4	1	7	4
11	MF	(Mexico) MEX	Damián Álvarez	43	3	3+29	3	0	0	1+2	0	5+3	0
13	DF	(Mexico) MEX	Antonio Briseño	16	2	5+6	1	0	0	1+1	0	3	1
14	DF	(Mexico) MEX	Iván Estrada	11	0	3+2	0	0	0	1	0	5	0
15	MF	(Mexico) MEX	Manuel Viniegra	13	0	3+4	0	0	0	0+1	0	3+2	0
17	FW	(Chile) CHI	Héctor Mancilla	8	0	0+7	0	0	0	0	0	0+1	0
18	MF	(United States) USA	José Francisco Torres	23	1	5+9	0	0	0	2	0	4+3	1
19	MF	(Argentina) ARG	Guido Pizarro	51	1	39	1	0	0	6	0	6	0
20	MF	(Mexico) MEX	Javier Aquino	49	7	40	7	0	0	3	0	6	0
22	GK	(Mexico) MEX	Enrique Palos	6	0	3	0	0	0	0	0	3	0
24	DF	(Mexico) MEX	José Rivas	39	4	28+1	2	0	0	4+1	1	5	1
25	MF	(Mexico) MEX	Jürgen Damm	48	4	35+1	3	0	0	3	0	6+3	1
26	DF	(Mexico) MEX	Jairo González	3	0	0+1	0	0	0	0	0	2	0
29	MF	(Mexico) MEX	Jesús Dueñas	46	3	32+3	3	0	0	3+2	0	6	0
30	MF	(Mexico) MEX	Amaury Escoto	5	0	1+2	0	0	0	0	0	1+1	0
31	MF	(Mexico) MEX	Uvaldo Luna	3	0	0+1	0	0	0	0	0	0+2	0
32	MF	(Mexico) MEX	Genaro Castillo	3	0	0+1	0	0	0	0	0	1+1	0
34	MF	(Mexico) MEX	Jonathan Espericueta	4	0	1+1	0	0	0	0	0	0+2	0
35	DF	(Mexico) MEX	Alonso Zamora	5	2	2	0	0	0	0	0	3	2
297	MF	(Mexico) MEX	Ramon García	2	0	0+2	0	0	0	0	0	0	0
Players away from Tigres UANL on loan:
5	MF	(Uruguay) URU	Egidio Arévalo	21	2	12	1	0	0	5+1	1	3	0
16	FW	(Mexico) MEX	Enrique Esqueda	5	0	2	0	0	0	1+1	0	1	0
23	MF	(Mexico) MEX	Édgar Lugo	12	0	3+4	0	0	0	1+2	0	2	0
28	FW	(Nigeria) NGR	Ikechukwu Uche	1	1	0	0	0	0	0	0	0+1	1
Players who appeared for Tigres UANL no longer at the club:
8	FW	(Ecuador) ECU	Joffre Guerrón	19	2	13	2	0	0	2+1	0	3	0

=== Goal scorers ===
Place	Position	Nation	Number	Name	Liga MX	Clausura Copa MX	Copa Libertadores	Champions League	Total
1	FW	(France)	10	André-Pierre Gignac	28	0	1	4	33
2	FW	(Brazil)	9	Rafael Sóbis	11	0	1	0	12
3	MF	(Mexico)	20	Javier Aquino	7	0	0	0	7
4	MF	(Mexico)	25	Jürgen Damm	3	0	0	1	4
4	DF	(Mexico)	24	José Rivas	2	0	1	1	4
6	MF	(Mexico)	11	Damián Álvarez	3	0	0	0	3
6	DF	(Brazil)	3	Juninho	3	0	0	0	3
6	MF	(Mexico)	29	Jesús Dueñas	3	0	0	0	3
9	FW	(Ecuador)	8	Joffre Guerrón	2	0	0	0	2
9	MF	(Uruguay)	5	Egidio Arévalo	1	0	1	0	2
9	DF	(Mexico)	13	Antonio Briseño	1	0	0	1	2
9	DF	(Mexico)	35	Alonso Zamora	0	0	0	2	2
13	MF	(Mexico)	19	Guido Pizarro	1	0	0	0	1
13	FW	(Paraguay)	5	Fernando Fernández	1	0	0	0	1
13	MF	(Argentina)	8	Lucas Zelarrayán	1	0	0	0	1
13	DF	(Mexico)	4	Hugo Ayala	0	0	1	0	1
13				Own goal	0	0	1	0	1
13	MF	(United States)	18	José Francisco Torres	0	0	0	1	1
13	FW	(Nigeria)	28	Ikechukwu Uche	0	0	0	1	1
				TOTALS	67	0	6	11	84

=== Disciplinary record ===
Number	Nation	Position	Name	Liga MX		Clausura Copa MX		Copa Libertadores		Champions League		Total	
Number	Nation	Position	Name	Yellow card	Red card	Yellow card	Red card	Yellow card	Red card	Yellow card	Red card	Yellow card	Red card
1	(Argentina)	GK	Nahuel Guzmán	8	1	0	0	0	0	1	0	9	1
2	(Mexico)	DF	Israel Jiménez	10	0	0	0	2	0	1	0	13	0
3	(Mexico)	DF	Juninho	7	1	0	0	2	0	1	0	10	1
4	(Mexico)	DF	Hugo Ayala	5	1	0	0	2	1	0	0	7	2
6	(Mexico)	DF	Jorge Torres Nilo	8	0	0	0	3	0	2	0	12	0
8	(Ecuador)	FW	Joffre Guerrón	0	0	0	0	0	0	2	0	2	0
9	(Brazil)	FW	Rafael Sóbis	5	2	0	0	1	0	3	0	9	2
10	(France)	FW	André-Pierre Gignac	9	0	0	0	1	0	2	0	12	0
11	(Mexico)	MF	Damián Álvarez	0	0	0	0	0	0	2	1	2	1
13	(Mexico)	DF	Antonio Briseño	2	0	0	0	0	0	1	0	3	0
15	(Mexico)	MF	Manuel Viniegra	1	0	0	0	0	0	1	0	2	0
16	(Mexico)	FW	Enrique Esqueda	0	0	0	0	1	0	0	0	1	0
18	(United States)	MF	José Francisco Torres	1	0	0	0	1	0	0	0	2	0
19	(Argentina)	MF	Guido Pizarro	16	1	0	0	2	0	1	0	19	1
20	(Mexico)	MF	Javier Aquino	6	0	0	0	0	0	0	0	6	0
24	(Mexico)	DF	José Rivas	7	1	0	0	1	0	0	0	8	1
25	(Mexico)	MF	Jürgen Damm	3	0	0	0	0	0	0	0	3	0
26	(Mexico)	DF	Jairo González	1	0	0	0	0	0	0	0	1	0
27	(Mexico)	MF	Jürgen Damm	4	1	0	0	1	0	0	0	5	1
29	(Mexico)	MF	Jesús Dueñas	7	1	0	0	0	0	4	1	11	2
35	(Mexico)	DF	Alonso Zamora	2	0	0	0	0	0	1	0	3	0
			TOTALS	102	9	0	0	16	1	22	2	143	12
