= Lucas Cavallini =

Canadian soccer player (born 1992)

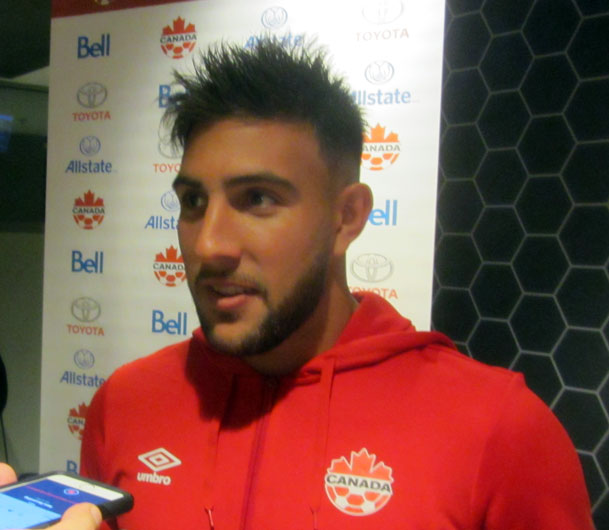
- Cavallini in 2018

Personal information
- Full name: Lucas Daniel Cavallini
- Date of birth: December 28, 1992 (age 33)
- Place of birth: Toronto, Ontario, Canada
- Height: 1.80 m (5 ft 11 in)
- Position: Forward

Team information
- Current team: Forge FC
- Number: 90

Youth career
- Club Uruguay Toronto
- Weston Wolves SC
- NY Hearts SC
- Clarkson Sheridan SC
- 2010–2012: Nacional

Senior career*
Years	Team	Apps	(Gls)
2012–2015	Nacional	4	(0)
2012–2013	→ Juventud (loan)	25	(10)
2013–2015	→ Fénix (loan)	40	(16)
2015–2016	Fénix	36	(12)
2017–2018	Peñarol	16	(6)
2017–2018	→ Puebla (loan)	25	(13)
2018–2019	Puebla	50	(16)
2020–2022	Vancouver Whitecaps FC	63	(18)
2022	→ Whitecaps FC 2 (loan)	1	(0)
2023	Tijuana	24	(3)
2024–2026	Puebla	21	(7)
2026	Forge FC	6	(2)

International career^{‡}
2011	Canada U20	3	(1)
2012	Canada U23	3	(1)
2012–2023	Canada	40	(19)
Medal record
Representing Canada
Men's soccer
CONCACAF Nations League
Runner-up	2023
- * Club domestic league appearances and goals as of October 18, 2026 ‡ National team caps and goals as of July 9, 2023

Lucas Daniel Cavallini (born December 28, 1992) is a Canadian professional soccer player who plays as a forward for Canadian Premier League side Forge FC.

== Early life ==
Cavallini was born in Canada to an Argentine father and an Italian mother. He played youth soccer in Canada with Club Uruguay, Weston Wolves SC, NY Hearts, and Clarkson Sheridan SC. He left Canada at age 16 and went to South America to develop his soccer talents. He began playing for Nacional's youth development squads in 2010 in Montevideo, Uruguay.

== Club career ==
=== Nacional ===
In June 2011, he participated in the 2011 U-20 Copa Libertadores. In the first game, Nacional beat Libertad 1–0 with a goal by Romero. In the second match, they beat Jorge Wilstermann 3–1 with goals from Bueno, Marchelli and again Romero. In the third and final game, Nacional drew 0–0 with Universitario, and qualified for the quarterfinals. On June 20, they were defeated by Mexican side América 1–0, which led to their elimination.

His development in the youth squad lead him to sign a senior contract with the club in early 2012.

==== Loan to Juventud ====
In mid-July 2012, he was loaned to Juventud de Las Piedras to make his professional debut and have more chances in the first team. In his second match with the club, he scored his first official goal in the 1–0 home victory against Central Español. On October 7, he was the man of the match against Bella Vista, assisting and scoring a goal in his team's 2–0 victory. His third goal came six days later, in a 1–1 away draw against Fénix.

=== CA Fénix ===
After a slow start during his first season on loan with C.A. Fénix, Cavallini emerged as the club's most prolific goal scorer in the Apertura of the 2014–15 Uruguayan Primera División season. He joined them permanently before the start of the 2015 Apertura.

=== Peñarol ===
Cavallini joined Peñarol on January 10, 2017. He scored his first goal against Montevideo Wanderers on February 26. He was loaned to Liga MX side Puebla on August 31, 2017.

=== Puebla ===
Cavallini was loaned to Liga MX side Puebla on August 31, 2017, becoming the first Canadian to play in Mexico's top tier since Isidro Sánchez Macip in 2010. He debuted for the club against Cruz Azul on September 9, coming on in the 64th minute for Félix Micolta in a 0–0 draw. He scored his first goal for Puebla against Necaxa on September 16. After scoring 13 goals in 25 matches for Puebla in the 2017–18 season, the club would sign him to a four-year contract in June 2018.

=== Vancouver Whitecaps FC ===
In December 2019, Puebla and Major League Soccer side Vancouver Whitecaps FC agreed to a transfer, with Cavallini signing a three-year deal with the club ahead of the 2020 MLS season. He made his debut in Vancouver's season-opening 3–1 loss to Sporting Kansas City on March 1, 2020. Cavallini scored his first regular-season goal for Vancouver on September 6, netting the opener in a 3–2 victory over Toronto FC In August 2022, he joined Whitecaps FC 2 on loan for a match in MLS Next Pro.

=== Tijuana ===
In February 2023, Cavallini returned to Mexico and signed with Tijuana. On February 10 he made his debut for Xolos against Atlético San Luis, coming on as a substitute in an eventual 1-0 victory. Cavallini scored his first goal for Xolos on March 3 against Atlas.

=== Return to Puebla ===
On January 5, 2024, Cavallini left Tijuana and returned to Puebla as a free agent. He began the Apertura 2024 tournament in strong form, scoring four goals in his first four league matches to sit among the joint leaders of the Liga MX scoring chart, alongside Raúl Zúñiga, Paulinho and Henry Martín. In August 2024, however, he suffered a ruptured anterior cruciate ligament in his right knee during training, ruling him out for the remainder of the Apertura 2024 tournament, and he subsequently missed the entire Clausura 2025 tournament.

After nearly a year of rehabilitation, Cavallini returned to action in July 2025, appearing as a substitute against Mazatlán on July 19, 2025. Days later, he was diagnosed with a second rupture of the anterior cruciate ligament in the same knee, requiring further surgery. In February 2026, Puebla left Cavallini off its Liga MX registration list for the Clausura 2026 tournament, ruling him out for the remainder of the season while he continued his recovery.

== International career ==
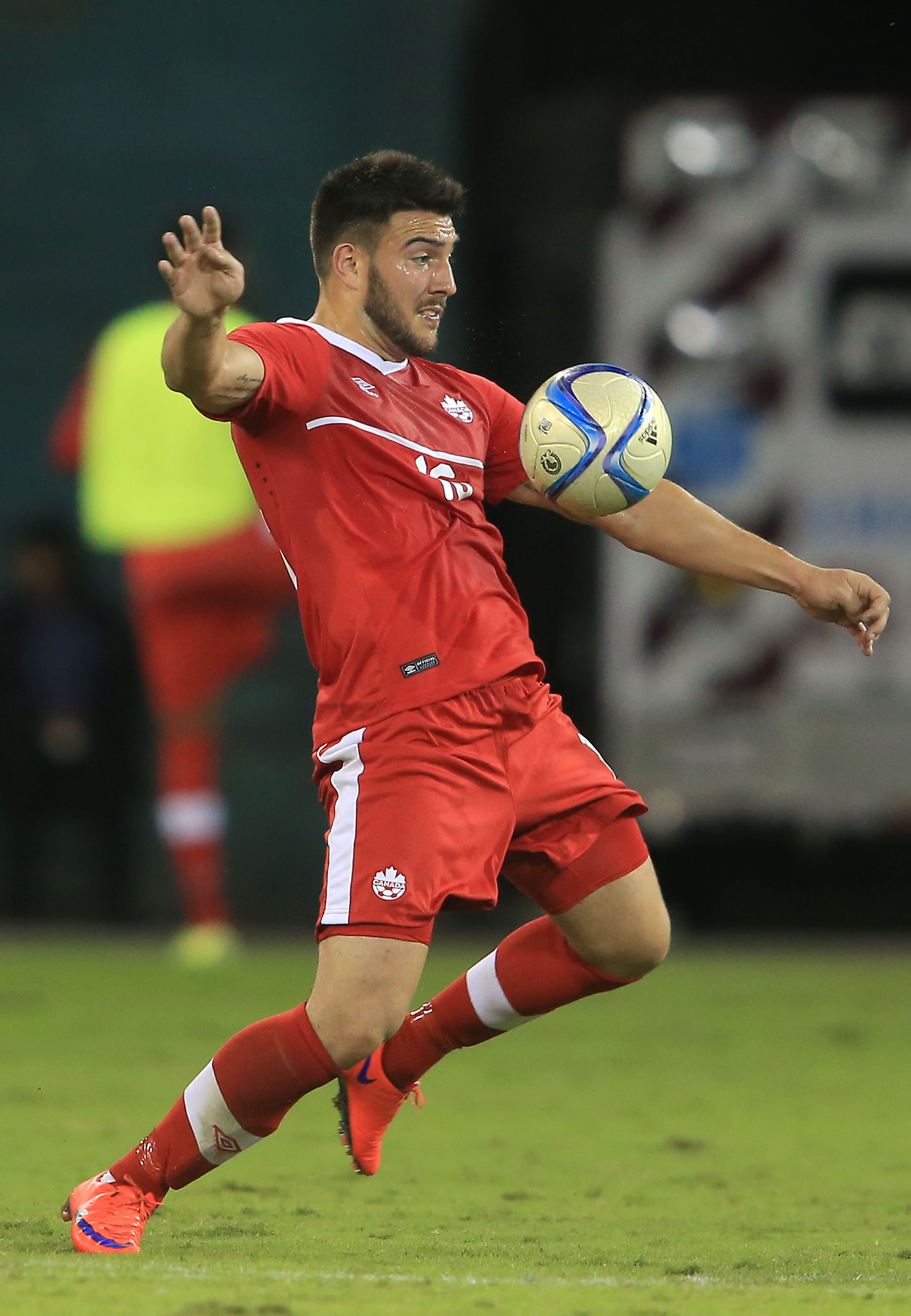
Cavallini with Canada in 2015

Cavallini launched his international career for Canada at 18 years old, debuting for the U-20 team in 2011 during the CONCACAF U-20 Championship in Guatemala. Cavallini earned three call-ups to Canada's U-23 National team.

Cavallini's performance, along with the fact that he "plays in a different type of league (down in Uruguay)", according to head coach Stephen Hart, earned him his first call up to the senior roster to face Trinidad & Tobago in a friendly match on August 13, 2012. Cavallini debuted for Canada as a second-half substitute for Terry Dunfield against Trinidad, a 2–0 victory.

Cavallini made his World Cup qualifying debut in Canada's 8–1 loss to Honduras. Following that match, he declined a call-up from interim coach Colin Miller for the 2013 Gold Cup, citing personal reasons. Then coach Benito Floro gave an interview in October 2014 where he elaborated on Cavallini, saying that he had reached out to the player and had not heard back from him. Floro however pointed out that there is a place in the team for him in the future. In May 2015, Cavallini stated in an interview with Tenfield that he regretted becoming cap-tied to Canada.

Despite his comments, Cavallini was called up to face Ghana in an October 2015 friendly. In an interview regarding his return to the national team, Cavallini stated that he did not say he would never play for Les Rouges again, and that his comments were wrongly translated. He mentioned that his lack of appearances were related to personal matters and timing including the birth of his daughter.

Cavallini was named to the Canadian 40-man provisional team for the 2017 CONCACAF Gold Cup by Canada coach Octavio Zambrano on June 6, 2017. He was confirmed as part of the final 23-man squad on June 27.

Cavallini scored his first goals for Canada on September 9, 2018, netting a brace in an 8–0 victory over the U.S. Virgin Islands in a CONCACAF Nations League qualifier. On May 30, 2019, Cavallini was named to the final squad for the 2019 CONCACAF Gold Cup. He scored a hat-trick in a 7–0 win over Cuba during the group stage on June 23, and had a chance to score his fourth goal from a penalty spot, but his panenka went over the crossbar. On March 29, 2021, Cavallini scored his second hat-trick with Canada, as a substitute, in an 11–0 win over Cayman Islands in the team's second 2022 World Cup qualifying match.

In July 2021 Cavallini was named to the Canadian squad for the 2021 CONCACAF Gold Cup. In November 2022, Cavallini was called up to Canada's 26-man squad for the 2022 FIFA World Cup. He made one appearance for Canada in Qatar, in Canada's second match on November 27 against Croatia.

In June 2023, Cavallini was named to the final 23-man squad for Canada ahead of the 2023 CONCACAF Nations League Finals. On June 19, he was named to the squad for the 2023 CONCACAF Gold Cup.

== Style of play ==
Cavallini plays as a forward. He is known for his aerial ability.

== Personal life ==
Cavallini has been married and has three children. He has been nicknamed "El Tanque".

== Honours ==
Peñarol

- Uruguayan Primera División: 2017

Vancouver Whitecaps FC

- Canadian Championship: 2022

Forge FC

- Canadian Championship: 2026

== Career statistics ==
=== Club ===
As of match played July 19, 2025

Appearances and goals by club, season and competition
Club	Season	League			Cup (Note: Includes Copa MX)		Continental (Note: Includes Copa Libertadores and Copa Sudamericana)		Other		Total	
Club	Season	Division	Apps	Goals	Apps	Goals	Apps	Goals	Apps	Goals	Apps	Goals
Nacional	2013–14	Uruguayan Primera División	4	0	0	0	0	0	0	0	4	0
Juventud (loan)	2012–13	Uruguayan Primera División	25	10	0	0	0	0	0	0	25	10
Fénix (loan)	2013–14	Uruguayan Primera División	13	2	0	0	0	0	0	0	13	2
Fénix (loan)	2014–15	Uruguayan Primera División	27	14	0	0	0	0	0	0	27	14
Fénix (loan)	Total		40	16	0	0	0	0	0	0	40	16
Fénix	2015–16	Uruguayan Primera División	25	7	0	0	0	0	0	0	25	7
Fénix	2016	Uruguayan Primera División	11	5	0	0	2	0	0	0	13	5
Fénix	Total		36	12	0	0	2	0	0	0	38	12
Peñarol	2017	Uruguayan Primera División	16	6	0	0	1	0	0	0	17	6
Puebla (loan)	2017–18	Liga MX	25	13	1	0	0	0	0	0	26	13
Puebla	2018–19	Liga MX	33	11	4	1	0	0	0	0	37	12
Puebla	2019–20	Liga MX	17	5	1	0	0	0	0	0	18	5
Puebla	Total		75	29	6	1	0	0	0	0	81	30
Vancouver Whitecaps FC	2020	MLS	18	6	0	0	0	0	0	0	18	6
Vancouver Whitecaps FC	2021	MLS	21	3	0	0	0	0	1 (Note: Appearance in MLS Cup Playoffs)	0	22	3
Vancouver Whitecaps FC	2022	MLS	24	9	4	0	0	0	0	0	28	9
Vancouver Whitecaps FC	Total		63	18	4	0	0	0	1	0	68	18
Whitecaps FC 2 (loan)	2022	MLS Next Pro	1	0	—		—		—		1	0
Tijuana	2022–23	Liga MX	12	2	—		—		—		12	2
Tijuana	2023–24	Liga MX	12	1	—		—		1 (Note: Appearance in Leagues Cup)	0	13	1
Tijuana	Total		24	3	0	0	0	0	1	0	25	3
Puebla	2023–24	Liga MX	16	3	—		—		—		16	3
Puebla	2024–25	Liga MX	4	4	—		—		2 (Note: Appearances in Leagues Cup)	0	6	4
Puebla	2025–26	Liga MX	1	0	—		—		—		1	0
Puebla	Total		21	7	0	0	0	0	2	0	23	7
Career total			305	101	10	1	3	0	4	0	322	102

=== International ===
As of match played July 9, 2023

Appearances and goals by national team and year
National team	Year	Apps	Goals
Canada	2012	2	0
Canada	2013	0	0
Canada	2014	0	0
Canada	2015	1	0
Canada	2016	0	0
Canada	2017	4	0
Canada	2018	3	3
Canada	2019	7	8
Canada	2020	0	0
Canada	2021	11	5
Canada	2022	7	2
Canada	2023	5	1
Total		40	19

As of June 27, 2023
Scores and results list Canada's goal tally first, score column indicates score after each Cavallini goal.

List of international goals scored by Lucas Cavallini
No.	Date	Venue	Cap	Opponent	Score	Result	Competition
1	September 9, 2018	IMG Academy, Bradenton, United States	8	U.S. Virgin Islands	2–0	8–0	2019–20 CONCACAF Nations League qualification
2	September 9, 2018	IMG Academy, Bradenton, United States	8	U.S. Virgin Islands	5–0	8–0	2019–20 CONCACAF Nations League qualification
3	October 16, 2018	BMO Field, Toronto, Canada	9	Dominica	3–0	5–0	2019–20 CONCACAF Nations League qualification
4	March 24, 2019	BC Place, Vancouver, Canada	11	French Guiana	2–1	4–1	2019–20 CONCACAF Nations League qualification
5 (Note: This is credited in certain sources as an own goal; however, the header by Cavallini was on target and parried by Jean-Beaunel Petit-Homme, the Guianan keeper, into his net, therefore should stand as a second goal for Cavallini.)	March 24, 2019	BC Place, Vancouver, Canada	11	French Guiana	4–1	4–1	2019–20 CONCACAF Nations League qualification
6	June 20, 2019	Broncos Stadium at Mile High, Denver, United States	13	Mexico	1–2	1–3	2019 CONCACAF Gold Cup
7	June 23, 2019	Bank of America Stadium, Charlotte, United States	14	Cuba	2–0	7–0	2019 CONCACAF Gold Cup
8	June 23, 2019	Bank of America Stadium, Charlotte, United States	14	Cuba	3–0	7–0	2019 CONCACAF Gold Cup
9	June 23, 2019	Bank of America Stadium, Charlotte, United States	14	Cuba	4–0	7–0	2019 CONCACAF Gold Cup
10	June 29, 2019	NRG Stadium, Houston, United States	15	Haiti	2–0	2–3	2019 CONCACAF Gold Cup
11	October 15, 2019	BMO Field, Toronto, Canada	16	United States	2–0	2–0	2019–20 CONCACAF Nations League A
12	March 29, 2021	IMG Academy, Bradenton, United States	19	Cayman Islands	8–0	11–0	2022 FIFA World Cup qualification
13	March 29, 2021	IMG Academy, Bradenton, United States	19	Cayman Islands	10–0	11–0	2022 FIFA World Cup qualification
14	March 29, 2021	IMG Academy, Bradenton, United States	19	Cayman Islands	11–0	11–0	2022 FIFA World Cup qualification
15	June 5, 2021	IMG Academy, Bradenton, United States	20	Aruba	1–0	7–0	2022 FIFA World Cup qualification
16	June 5, 2021	IMG Academy, Bradenton, United States	20	Aruba	3–0	7–0	2022 FIFA World Cup qualification
17	June 9, 2022	BC Place, Vancouver, Canada	32	Curaçao	4–0	4–0	2022–23 CONCACAF Nations League A
18	November 17, 2022	Al Maktoum Stadium, Dubai, United Arab Emirates	34	Japan	2–1	2–1	Friendly
19	June 27, 2023	BMO Field, Toronto, Canada	37	Guadeloupe	1–1	2–2	2023 CONCACAF Gold Cup
