= Pedro Goulart =

Mexican footballer (born 1997)

Personal information
- Full name: Pedro Augusto Goulart Da Rosa
- Date of birth: 29 August 1997 (age 29)
- Place of birth: Santa Catarina, Brazil
- Height: 1.81 m (5 ft 11 in)
- Position: Forward

Youth career
- 2013–2016: Puebla
- 2016–2017: → León (loan)

Senior career*
| Years | Team | Apps | (Gls) |
| 2017–2020 | Puebla | 6 | (0) |
| 2019 | → Cimarrones (loan) | 0 | (0) |
| 2020 | → Cimarrones Premier (loan) | 4 | (2) |
| 2021–2022 | Inter Playa | 27 | (8) |
| 2022 | Saltillo | 0 | (0) |
- * Club domestic league appearances and goals as of 22:19, 12 September 2019 (UTC)

Pedro Augusto Goulart Da Rosa (born 29 August 1997) is a Mexican footballer who plays as a forward for Cimarrones de Sonora.

== Career ==
Born in Brazil, Goulart moved to Mexico at the age of five. He has played for the Mexican under-18 and under-20 national teams.
