= Jairo González =

Mexican footballer (born 1992)

Personal information
- Full name: Jairo Daniel González Fajardo
- Date of birth: 27 February 1992 (age 34)
- Place of birth: Guadalajara, Jalisco, Mexico
- Height: 1.69 m (5 ft 6 1/2 in)
- Position: Full-back

Team information
- Current team: UdeG Premier (Manager)

Youth career
- 2011–2012: Guadalajara

Senior career*
Years	Team	Apps	(Gls)
2012–2015	UdeG	57	(2)
2015	→ Tigres UANL (loan)	1	(0)
2016	Dorados	13	(2)
2016–2021	Necaxa	58	(1)
2018–2019	→ Lobos BUAP (loan)	0	(0)
2021–2024	UdeG	51	(4)

International career
2008–2009	Mexico U17	2	(0)

Managerial career
- 2025–: UdeG Premier
- * Club domestic league appearances and goals as of 22 October 2022

Jairo Daniel González Fajardo (born 27 February 1992) is a Mexican former professional footballer who played as a full-back.

== Club career ==
=== Youth ===
Jairo was formed in his hometown with C.D. Guadalajara. He joined Chivas San Rafael in 2008 and played his whole youth career with the club.

=== U. de G. ===
Jairo was loaned out to U. de G. after playing with Guadalajara's under 20s. After the team managed promotion to Liga MX, they bought Jairo's rights along with Hector Reynoso.

=== UANL ===
After the relegation of Leones Negros, González signed a 6-month loan with Tigres UANL.

=== Sinaloa ===
On 17 December 2015, Dorados de Sinaloa agreed to sign González on loan from Club Universidad de Guadalajara. In May 2016, Dorados were relegated to the Ascenso MX, been the second time in two years that González lost the category with two different teams, he then returned to Leones Negros after his loan expired with Dorados de Sinaloa.

=== Necaxa ===
In June 2016, Necaxa signed González on loan from Club Universidad de Guadalajara.

== Honours ==
Necaxa

- Copa MX: Clausura 2018
