= Christian Marrugo =

Colombian footballer (born 1985)

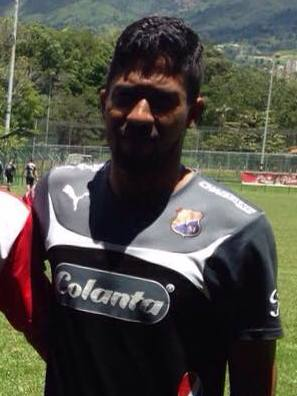
- Christian Marrugo in 2016

Personal information
- Full name: Christian Camilo Marrugo Rodríguez
- Date of birth: July 18, 1985 (age 41)
- Place of birth: Cartagena, Colombia
- Height: 1.78 m (5 ft 10 in)
- Position: Attacking midfielder

Team information
- Current team: Real Cartagena
- Number: 17

Youth career
- 2000–2002: Deportivo Cali

Senior career*
Years	Team	Apps	(Gls)
2002–2006	Atlético Nacional	94	(14)
2006–2007	Santa Fe	51	(13)
2008–2012	Deportes Tolima	212	(30)
2013–2017	Pachuca	15	(0)
2013–2014	→ Veracruz (loan)	17	(5)
2014	→ Deportivo Cali (loan)	21	(1)
2014–2017	→ Independiente Medellín (loan)	93	(15)
2017–2020	Club Puebla	54	(5)
2018–2019	→ Millonarios (loan)	37	(3)
2020–2022	Rionegro Águilas	68	(15)
2022	Independiente Medellín	22	(1)
2023	Santa Fe	35	(2)
2024–	Real Cartagena	43	(8)

International career
2008–2012	Colombia	11	(0)
- * Club domestic league appearances and goals as of 21 April 2025

Christian Camilo Marrugo Rodríguez (born 18 July 1985), is a professional footballer who plays as an attacking midfielder for Real Cartagena.

== Club career ==
When he was 15 years old, he traveled from Cartagena and joined Deportivo Cali's youth ranks, before making his debut with Atlético Nacional in the 2002 Finalizacion. In the 2005 Apertura he won his first title as a professional after Nacional beat Independiente Santa Fe in the finals. In 2006, he joined Santa Fe.

Marrugo joined Deportes Tolima in 2008. He was part of the squad that finished runner-up to Once Caldas in 2010 Finalizacion. On 27 February 2011, he provided two assists in a 3–2 away victory to Cucuta. On 3 April 2011, he scored once and had three assists in a 7–4 victory away to Atlético Huila. On 7 May 2011, he scored in a historic 5–0 home victory against his former club Atletico Nacional. On 26 May 2011, he scored in a 3–1 victory against Cúcuta Deportivo in the playoffs quarter-finals. On 28 October 2012, Marrugo scored twice in five minutes to give Tolima the three points in a victory against Deportes Quindío.

In November 2012, after more than 200 games for Tolima, he has his first experience outside Colombia and joined Mexico's Pachuca. The following year, he was loaned out to Veracruz. In the beginning of 2014, Deportivo Cali acquired Marrugo to enforce the midfield for the Copa Libertadores and 2014 Apertura.

For the second semester of 2014, he was signed by Independiente Medellín. In the first matchday, he scored the only goal of the match in El Clasico Paisa. In his first season, he scored 3 goals and provided 11 assists in 22 appearances, helping the club finish runner-up to Santa Fe; the same occurred in the 2015 Apertura, this time against Deportivo Cali. In 2016, he helped Independiente Medellín win their sixth league championship, scoring a brace in the final against Junior.

In the 2016 Clausura, he scored 7 goals. 2 of those came against Boyaca Chico on 6 November 2016; with Medellin losing 2–1 at the 80th minute, Marrugo scored twice to give El Poderoso the 3–2 lead. On 28 May 2017, he scored in a 4-3 clásico paisa victory.

On 21 July 2017, Marrugo joined Mexico's Puebla.

In June 2018 he joined Millonarios. On 14 April 2019, Marrugo scored twice and provided an assist in a 3–1 away victory against Patriotas Boyaca.

In 2020 he joined Rionegro Aguilas. In the 2021 Finalizacion he scored 4 goals and provided 9 assists.

In 2024 he joined Real Cartagena of the Categoría Primera B.

== International career ==
He played with the Colombia national u-20 team at the 2005 South American Youth Championship, which Colombia hosted and won. He then competed at the 2005 FIFA World Youth Championship in the Netherlands, helping Colombia to the Round of 16 before losing to eventual champion Argentina.

In 2008 he made his debut with the Colombia national team.

== Personal life ==
Marrugo and his family have strong sports habits, his brother Camilo Marrugo has also played a couple of professional games in the Colombian league with Real Cartagena and Cúcuta Deportivo.

== Honours ==
Atlético Nacional

- Categoría Primera A: 2005–I

Deportivo Cali

- Superliga Colombiana: 2014

Independiente Medellín

- Categoría Primera A: 2016–I
