= Nicolás Vikonis =

Uruguayan footballer (born 1984)

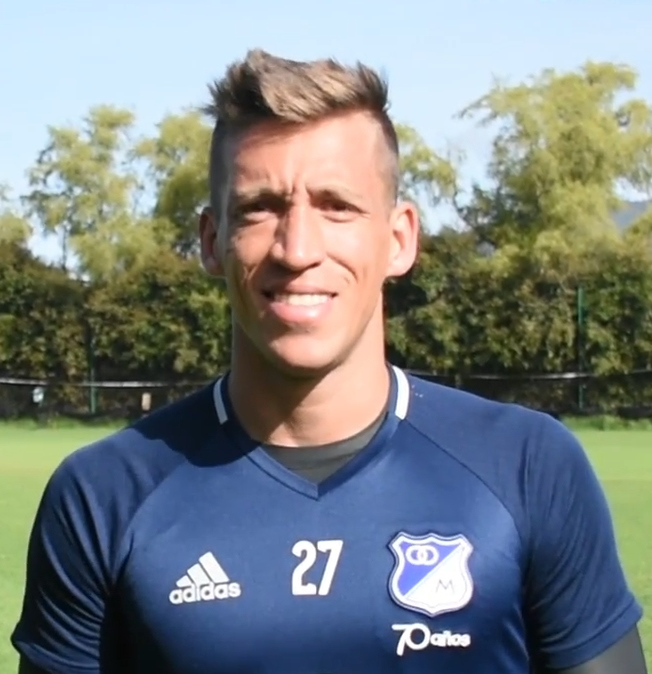
- Vikonis in 2016

Personal information
- Full name: Nicolás Vikonis Moreau
- Date of birth: April 6, 1984 (age 42)
- Place of birth: Montevideo, Uruguay
- Height: 1.84 m (6 ft 0 in)
- Position: Goalkeeper

Team information
- Current team: Liverpool Montevideo

Senior career*
Years	Team	Apps	(Gls)
2001–2005	Huracán Buceo	24	(0)
2005	Fénix	0	(0)
2006–2008	Liverpool Montevideo	21	(0)
2008–2009	Rampla Juniors	20	(0)
2009–2011	Cerrito	32	(0)
2011–2012	Atlético Bucaramanga	33	(0)
2013–2014	Patriotas	57	(0)
2015–2017	Millonarios	120	(0)
2018–2020	Real Madrid	79	(0)
2021–2023	Mazatlán	71	(0)
2023–2024	Celaya	30	(0)
2024–	Liverpool Montevideo	0	(0)

International career
2001	Uruguay U17		
- * Club domestic league appearances and goals as of 01:58, 9 May 2023 (UTC)

Nicolás Vikonis Moreau (born 6 April 1984) is a Uruguayan professional footballer who plays as a goalkeeper for Primera División club Liverpool Montevideo.

== Personal life ==
On 31 March 2020, Vikonis and his girlfriend at the time Paola Salcedo, a Mexican model and sister of professional footballer Carlos Salcedo announced on Instagram the birth of their son, Luka Mateo.
