= Jesús Rodríguez (Mexican footballer) =

Mexican footballer (born 1993)

Personal information
- Full name: Jesús Iván Rodríguez Trujillo
- Date of birth: 21 May 1993 (age 33)
- Place of birth: Tuxtla Gutiérrez, Chiapas, Mexico
- Height: 1.85 m (6 ft 1 in)
- Position: Goalkeeper

Team information
- Current team: Puebla
- Number: 33

Youth career
- 2009: Jaguares de Ocozocuautla
- 2010–2014: Puebla

Senior career*
Years	Team	Apps	(Gls)
2014–	Puebla	63	(0)
2015	→ Cafetaleros (loan)	0	(0)
2016	→ Chiapas (loan)	0	(0)
- * Club domestic league appearances and goals as of 10 October 2026

Jesús Iván Rodríguez Trujillo (Note: In this Spanish name, the first or paternal surname is Rodríguez and the second or maternal family name is Trujillo.) (born 21 May 1993), also known as La Araña, is a Mexican professional footballer who plays as a goalkeeper for Liga MX club Puebla.
