= Alan Acosta =

Mexican footballer (born 1996)

Personal information
- Full name: Alan Jesús Acosta Montañez
- Date of birth: 19 December 1996 (age 29)
- Place of birth: Ecatepec de Morelos, Mexico
- Height: 1.75 m (5 ft 9 in)
- Position: Midfielder

Team information
- Current team: Deportiva Venados
- Number: 17

Youth career
- 2011–2015: UNAM

Senior career*
Years	Team	Apps	(Gls)
2015–2020	UNAM	22	(1)
2019–2020	→ Puebla (loan)	31	(2)
2021–2023	Chiapas	49	(8)
2023–	Deportiva Venados	12	(2)
- * Club domestic league appearances and goals as of 3 November 2023, 17:13 (UTC)

Alan Jesús Acosta Montañez (born December 19, 1996) is a Mexican professional footballer who plays for Deportiva Venados.
