= Daniel Arreola =

Mexican footballer (born 1990)

Personal information
- Full name: Daniel Arreola meneses
- Date of birth: 8 October 1985 (age 41)
- Place of birth: Cancún, Quintana Roo, Mexico
- Height: 1.81 m (5 ft 11 in)
- Position: Defender

Senior career*
Years	Team	Apps	(Gls)
2008	Potros Chetumal	5	(4)
2008–2010	Atlante	58	(2)
2010–2015	Pachuca	83	(5)
2011	→ Atlas (loan)	20	(2)
2015	Morelia	12	(1)
2015–2016	→ Sinaloa (loan)	20	(1)
2016–2018	Atlas	47	(3)
2018–2020	Puebla	58	(7)
2020–2021	Alajuelense	33	(2)
Total		336	(27)

International career
2010	Mexico	1	(0)
- * Club domestic league appearances and goals

Daniel Arreola Argüello (born 8 October 1985) is a Mexican former professional footballer who played as a defender.

== Club career ==
=== Atlante ===
Arreola debuted in the Apertura 2008 season opener, coming in as a sub in the 54th minute, as Atlante beat Deportivo Toluca, 2–1. He scored his first goal on November 12 of that same year against Tecos UAG in a 3–1 win.

=== Atlas ===
On 8 June 2016, Atlas made the signing of Arreola official for the Apertura 2016.

== International career ==
=== Mexico national team ===
His first international appearance came on March 17, 2010, for the Mexico national team in a 2–1 win over North Korea in Torreón.

International appearances
#	Date	Venue	Opponent	Result	Competition
1.	17 March 2010	Estadio Corona, Torreón, Mexico	North Korea	2–1	Friendly

== Honours ==
Atlante

- CONCACAF Champions League: 2008–09

Alajuelense

- CONCACAF League: 2020
