= Félix Micolta =

Colombian footballer (born 1989)

Personal information
- Full name: Félix Andrés Micolta
- Date of birth: November 30, 1989 (age 36)
- Place of birth: El Charco, Colombia
- Height: 1.87 m (6 ft 2 in)
- Position: Winger

Senior career*
| Years | Team | Apps | (Gls) |
| 2008 | Atlético Bucaramanga | 17 | (1) |
| 2009–2011 | Once Caldas | 49 | (8) |
| 2011 | Deportes Tolima | 6 | (0) |
| 2012 | Deportivo Cali | 17 | (4) |
| 2012–2015 | Atlético Nacional | 24 | (2) |
| 2013 | → Santa Fe (loan) | 11 | (0) |
| 2014 | → Uniautónoma (loan) | 11 | (0) |
| 2014–2015 | → Marítimo (loan) | 6 | (0) |
| 2014–2015 | → Marítimo B (loan) | 8 | (1) |
| 2015 | Independiente Medellín | 11 | (0) |
| 2016 | Juárez | 35 | (6) |
| 2017 | Chiapas | 19 | (7) |
| 2017–2018 | Puebla | 23 | (3) |
| 2018 | America de Cali | 10 | (1) |
| 2019 | Avispa Fukuoka | 12 | (1) |
| 2020 | Figueirense | 3 | (0) |
| 2021 | Once Caldas | 9 | (1) |
| 2022 | Venados | 11 | (1) |
- * Club domestic league appearances and goals as of 14 February 2019

Félix Andrés Micolta (born 30 November 1989) is a Colombian professional footballer who plays as a winger, most recently for Mexican club Venados.
