= Alejandro Chumacero =

Bolivian footballer (born 1991)

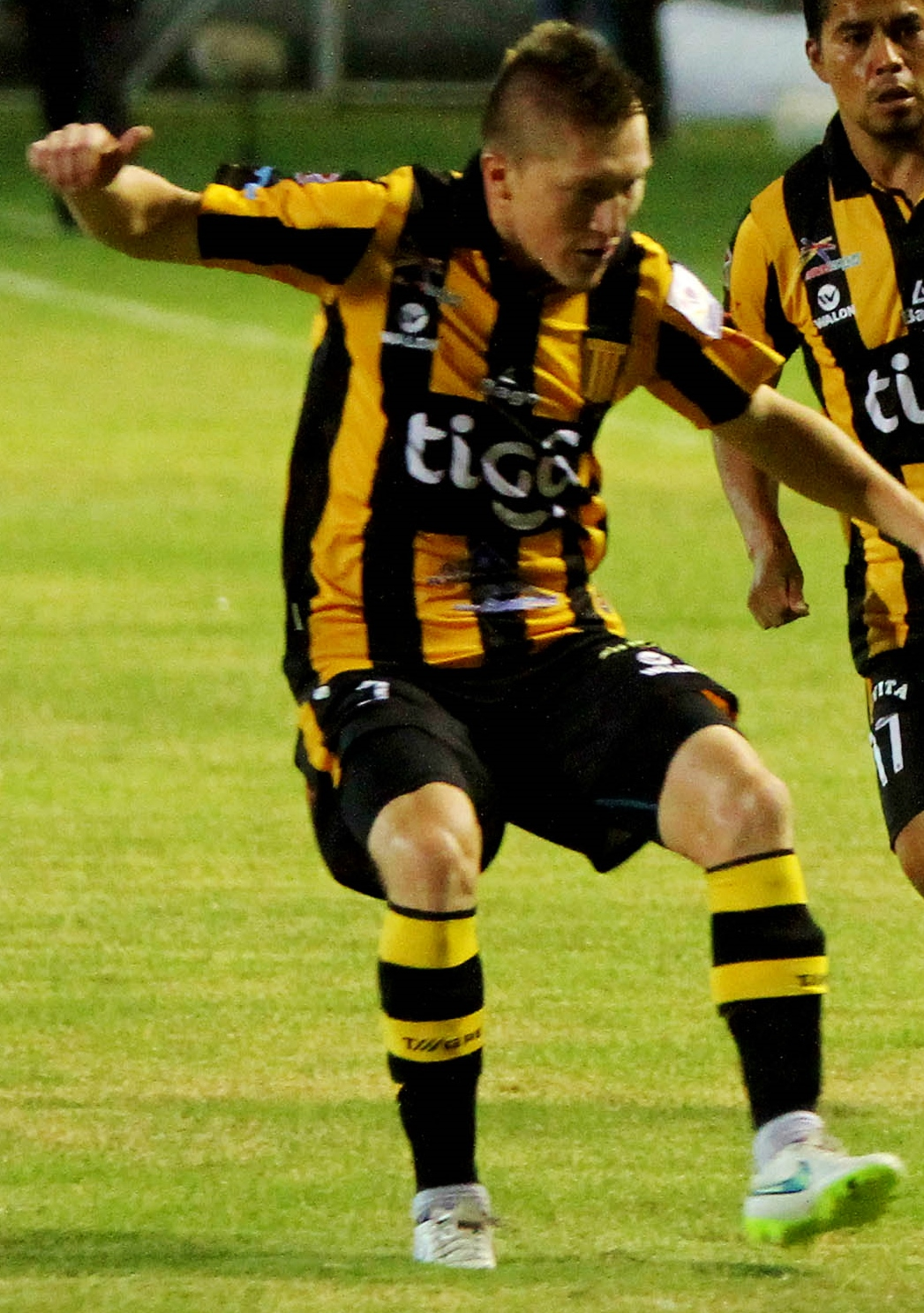
- Chumacero with The Strongest in 2015

Personal information
- Full name: Alejandro Saúl Chumacero Bracamonte
- Date of birth: 22 April 1991 (age 35)
- Place of birth: La Paz, Bolivia
- Height: 1.64 m (5 ft 4 1/2 in)
- Position: Midfielder

Team information
- Current team: Wilstermann
- Number: 3

Youth career
- The Strongest

Senior career*
Years	Team	Apps	(Gls)
2007–2013	The Strongest	175	(27)
2013	Sport Recife	5	(0)
2013–2017	The Strongest	130	(31)
2018–2020	Puebla	72	(4)
2021	Unión Española	9	(2)
2022	Always Ready	31	(1)
2023–	Jorge Wilstermann	66	(1)

International career^{‡}
2011	Bolivia U20	3	(0)
2011–	Bolivia	49	(2)
- * Club domestic league appearances and goals as of 30 December 2025 ‡ National team caps and goals as of 18:29, 31 January 2022 (UTC)

Alejandro Saúl Chumacero Bracamonte (born 22 April 1991) is a Bolivian professional footballer who plays as a midfielder for Bolivian Primera División club Wilstermann and the Bolivia national team.

== Club career ==
Born in La Paz, Chumacero has played for The Strongest and Sport Recife.

He signed a five-year contract with Brazilian club Sport Recife in July 2013. In December 2013 he said he wished to leave the club and return to former club The Strongest due to lack of first-team games.

In December 2017 it was announced he would sign for Liga MX with club Puebla.

== International career ==
He made his international debut for Bolivia in 2011, and has appeared in FIFA World Cup qualifying matches for them.

He represented Bolivia at the 2015 Copa América and was critical of the Bolivian press coverage of the team's performance in the tournament, believing them to be unfairly negative.

=== International goals ===
Scores and results list Bolivia's goal tally first.

No	Date	Venue	Opponent	Score	Result	Competition
1.	12 October 2012	Estadio Hernando Siles, La Paz, Bolivia	Peru	1–1	1–1	2014 FIFA World Cup qualification
2.	24 March 2016	Estadio Hernando Siles, La Paz, Bolivia	Colombia	2–2	2–3	2018 FIFA World Cup qualification
