= Pablo González (Mexican footballer) =

Mexican footballer (born 1992)

Personal information
- Full name: Pablo González Díaz
- Date of birth: 7 July 1992 (age 34)
- Place of birth: Puebla, Mexico
- Height: 1.78 m (5 ft 10 in)
- Position: Defensive midfielder

Team information
- Current team: Tlaxcala
- Number: 23

Youth career
- 2010–2012: Puebla

Senior career*
| Years | Team | Apps | (Gls) |
| 2012–2020 | Puebla | 76 | (5) |
| 2015–2016 | → Tapachula (loan) | 11 | (0) |
| 2021 | Atlas | 9 | (0) |
| 2021–2022 | Toluca | 3 | (0) |
| 2022–2025 | Puebla | 61 | (2) |
| 2025– | Tlaxcala | 10 | (1) |
- * Club domestic league appearances and goals as of 3 December 2024

Pablo González Díaz (born 7 July 1992) is a Mexican professional footballer who plays as a midfielder for Liga de Expansión MX club Tlaxcala.

== Career ==
González began his career in the Puebla under-17 youth squad in 2010. He worked up the ranks in the club's under-20 squad and made his professional first team debut in the 2012 Copa MX tournament against C.D. Irapuato González made his Liga debut on August 17 against Monarcas Morelia that same year.
