= Omar Fernández =

Colombian footballer (born 1993)

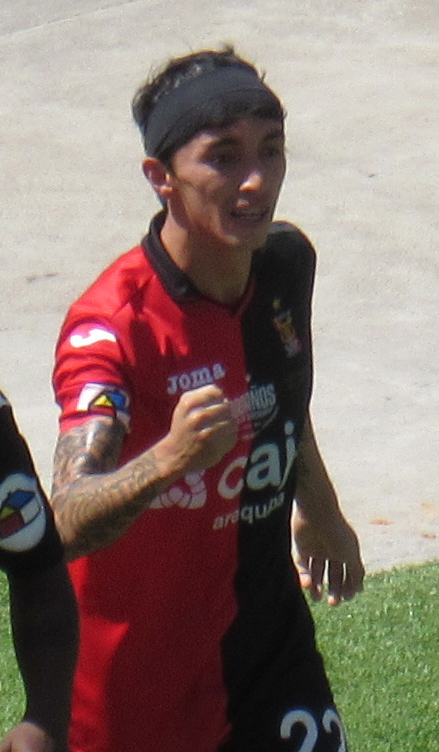

Personal information
- Full name: Omar Andrés Fernández Frasica
- Date of birth: 11 February 1993 (age 33)
- Place of birth: Zipaquirá, Colombia
- Height: 1.66 m (5 ft 5 in)
- Position: Winger

Team information
- Current team: Independiente Santa Fe
- Number: 8

Youth career
- 2009–2010: Academia

Senior career*
Years	Team	Apps	(Gls)
2011–2012	Academia	47	(17)
2012–2014	Llaneros	32	(3)
2013–2014	→ Cruz Azul Hidalgo (loan)	22	(5)
2014–2017	Melgar	126	(38)
2018–2021	Puebla	105	(6)
2021–2024	León	50	(1)
2022–2023	→ Puebla (loan)	29	(4)
2024	→ Everton (loan)	18	(1)
2025–	Independiente Santa Fe	43	(4)
- * Club domestic league appearances and goals as of 11 December 2025

Omar Andrés Fernández Frasica (born 11 February 1993) is a Colombian professional footballer who plays as a winger for Categoría Primera A club Independiente Santa Fe.

== Career ==
In 2024, he moved to Chile and joined Everton de Viña del Mar.

== Personal life ==
He has been married since January 2018 (or Winter 2017) to his long-time girlfriend Andrea. Before their marriage, they had two sons, Dylan Andrés and Thiago Andrés. On 12.02.2022, he announced that the couple was expecting another child. In May, he announced the gender and name of his third child, Isabella

== Honours ==
León

- Leagues Cup: 2021

Independiente Santa Fe

- Categoría Primera A: 2025-I
