= Christian Tabó =

Uruguayan footballer (born 1993)

Personal information
- Full name: Christian Alejandro Tabó Hornos
- Date of birth: 23 November 1993 (age 32)
- Place of birth: Montevideo, Uruguay
- Height: 1.74 m (5 ft 9 in)
- Position: Winger

Team information
- Current team: Liverpool Montevideo
- Number: 10

Youth career
- Racing de Montevideo

Senior career*
Years	Team	Apps	(Gls)
2011–2015	Racing de Montevideo	65	(4)
2015	→ Nacional (loan)	8	(0)
2015–2017	Atlas	32	(1)
2016	→ Nacional (loan)	12	(1)
2018–2021	Puebla	110	(20)
2022–2024	Cruz Azul	43	(3)
2023–2024	→ UNAM (loan)	14	(0)
2024–	Liverpool Montevideo	8	(0)
- * Club domestic league appearances and goals as of 27 November 2024

Christian Alejandro Tabó Hornos (born 23 November 1993) is a Uruguayan professional footballer who plays as a winger for Liverpool Montevideo.

== Career ==
Tabó started his professional career with Racing de Montevideo.

On 29 January 2015, he was loaned to Nacional, where he obtain the league title.

On 25 June 2015, Atlas officially announced the permanent transfer of the Uruguayan player. On 24 November 2015, Tabo scored his first goal with Atlas in the first leg of the Apertura 2018 quarter finals against Monterrey.

On 2 September 2024, Tabó signed with Liverpool Montevideo until the end of the year.

== Honours ==
Cruz Azul

- Supercopa de la Liga MX: 2022
