= Alonso Zamora =

Mexican footballer (born 1991)

Personal information
- Full name: Alonso René Zamora Barrera
- Date of birth: 7 November 1991 (age 35)
- Place of birth: Guadalajara, Jalisco, Mexico
- Height: 1.81 m (5 ft 11 1/2 in)
- Position: Defender

Youth career
- 2007–2008: Atlas

Senior career*
Years	Team	Apps	(Gls)
2008–2012	Atlas	18	(0)
2012–2017	Tigres UANL	7	(0)
2014	→ Atlante (loan)	10	(1)
2016	→ Chiapas (loan)	11	(0)
2017	→ Juárez (loan)	21	(2)
2017–2020	Puebla	43	(1)
2021	Dorados	35	(2)
2022–2023	Tepatitlán	27	(1)
- * Club domestic league appearances and goals as of 12 December 2021

Alonso René Zamora Barrera (Note: In this Spanish name, the first or paternal surname is Zamora and the second or maternal family name is Barrera.) (born 7 November 1991) is a Mexican professional footballer who plays as a defender.

Zamora worked his way up the ranks of the Atlas youth system, before making his professional debut with Académicos in 2008, which at the time played in professional Primera Division A, on 16 August 2008.

Zamora made his first-team debut on 21 June 2009, for Atlas in the Superliga 2009 against the Kansas City Wizards. He came on as a sub in the 46th minute.

== Honours ==
Tigres UANL

- Liga MX: Apertura 2015
