= 2011 in American soccer =

Soccer in the United States
- Season: 2011

Men's soccer
- Supporters' Shield: Los Angeles Galaxy
- NASL: NSC Minnesota Stars
- USL Pro: Orlando City
- PDL: Kitsap Pumas
- NPSL: Jacksonville United
- US Open Cup: Seattle Sounders FC
- MLS Cup: Los Angeles Galaxy

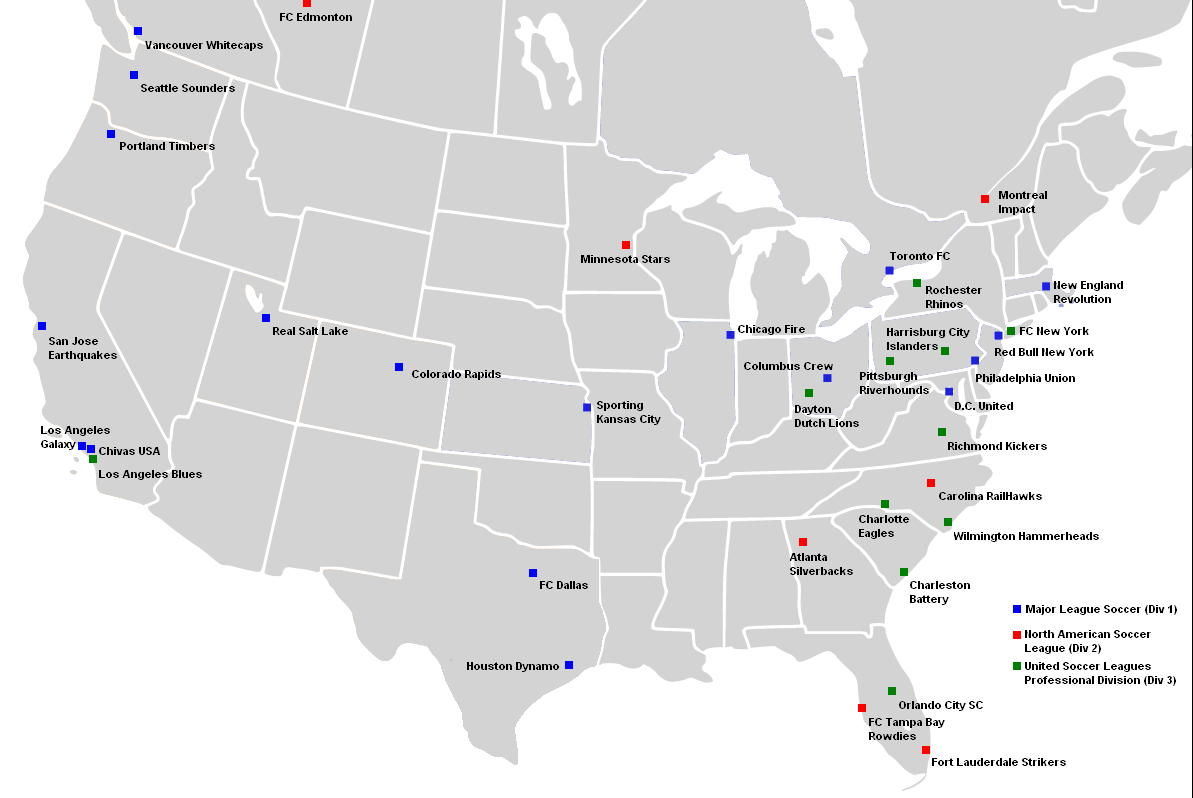
The professional soccer clubs of the United States and Canada, year 2011. Not pictured: NASL or USL Pro clubs based off the mainland.

The 2011 Season is the 99th season of competitive soccer in the United States.

== National teams ==
The home team or the team that is designated as the home team is listed in the left column; the away team is in the right column.

Win Draw Loss

=== Men ===
==== Senior ====
Wins	Losses	Draws
6	8	3

January 22 International Friendly	United States	1–1	Chile	Carson, California
19:00 UTC−08	Loyd (yellow card) 23'; Bunbury 75' (pen.)	Report	Silva (yellow card) 17'; Paredes 53'; Toro (yellow card) 82'	Stadium: Home Depot Center; Attendance: 18,580; Referee: Francisco Chacon Gutierrez (MEX)

March 26 International Friendly	United States	1–1	Argentina	East Rutherford, New Jersey
19:00 UTC−04	Edu (yellow card) 35'; Chandler (yellow card) 48'; Agudelo 59'; Donovan (yellow card) 79'; Bocanegra (yellow card) 90+1'	Report	Cambiasso 42'	Stadium: New Meadowlands Stadium; Attendance: 78,936; Referee: Roberto Garcia (MEX)

March 29 International Friendly	United States	0–1	Paraguay	Nashville, Tennessee
19:00 UTC−05		Report	Cardozo 18'; Vera (yellow card) 29'	Stadium: LP Field; Attendance: 29,059; Referee: Jose Benigno (HON)

June 4 International Friendly	United States	0–4	Spain	Foxborough, Massachusetts
16:30 UTC-4		Report	Cazorla 28', 41'; Negredo 32'; Fernando Torres 73'	Stadium: Gillette Stadium; Attendance: 64,121; Referee: Roberto Silvera (URU)

June 7 Gold Cup Group C	United States	2–0	Canada	Detroit, Michigan
20:00 UTC−04	Altidore 15'; Dempsey 62'; Bradley (yellow card) 51'	Report	Johnson (yellow card) 52'	Stadium: Ford Field; Attendance: 28,209; Referee: Walter López (GUA)

June 11 Gold Cup Group C	United States	1–2	Panama	Tampa, Florida
20:00 UTC−04	Jones (yellow card) 18'; Altidore (yellow card) 25'; Goodson 68' (yellow card) 56'; Bedoya (yellow card) 64'; Bocanegra (yellow card) 90+3'	Report	Goodson 19' (o.g.); Cooper (yellow card) 25'; Gómez 35' (pen.); Penedo (yellow card) 90+2'	Stadium: Raymond James Stadium; Attendance: 27,731; Referee: Marco Antonio Rodríguez Moreno (MEX)

June 14 Gold Cup Group C	Guadeloupe	0–1	United States	Kansas City, Kansas
20:00 UTC−05	Viator (yellow card) 66'; Zubar (yellow card) 77'; Auvray (yellow card) 89'	Report	Altidore 9'	Stadium: Livestrong Sporting Park; Attendance: 20,109; Referee: Marlon Mejia (SLV)

June 19 Gold Cup Quarterfinals	Jamaica	0–2	United States	Washington, D.C.
15:00 UTC−04	Austin (yellow card) 16'; Taylor (red card) 67'	Report	Jones (yellow card) 26' (goal) 49'; Dempsey 80'	Stadium: RFK Stadium; Attendance: 45,423; Referee: Marco Rodriguez (MEX)

June 22 Gold Cup Semifinals	United States	1–0	Panama	Houston, Texas
18:00 UTC−05	Bocanegra (yellow card) 68'; Dempsey 76'	Report	Cooper (yellow card) 18'; Henríquez (yellow card) 36'; Gómez (yellow card) 72'	Stadium: Reliant Stadium; Attendance: 70,267; Referee: Enrico Winjgaarde (SUR)

June 25 Gold Cup Final	United States	2–4	Mexico	Pasadena, California
18:00 UTC−07	Bradley 8'; Donovan 23' (yellow card) 33'; Dempsey (yellow card) 87'; Jones (yellow card) 90+1'	Report	Barrera 29', 50'; Guardado 36'; Dos Santos 76'; Torres (yellow card) 81'	Stadium: Rose Bowl; Attendance: 93,420; Referee: Joel Aguilar (SLV)

August 10 International Friendly	United States	1–1	Mexico	Philadelphia, Pennsylvania
21:00 UTC−05	Rogers 73'	Report	Peralta 17'; Juárez (yellow card) 42'; Márquez (yellow card) 67'; Torrado (yellow card) 86'	Stadium: Lincoln Financial Field; Attendance: 30,138; Referee: Raymond Bogle (JAM)

September 2 International Friendly	United States	0–1	Costa Rica	Carson, California
20:00 UTC−08	Donovan (yellow card) 58'; Shea (yellow card) 78'; Kljestan (yellow card) 79'	Report	Josué Martínez (yellow card) 29'; Wallace 65'; Miller (yellow card) 73'; Acosta (yellow card) 90+1'	Stadium: Home Depot Center; Attendance: 15,798; Referee: Jose Molina (HON)

September 6 International Friendly	Belgium	1–0	United States	Brussels, Belgium
20:30 UTC±0	Lombaerts 55'	Report		Stadium: King Baudouin Stadium; Attendance: 21,946; Referee: William Collum (SCO)

October 8 International Friendly	United States	1–0	Honduras	Miami Gardens, Florida
18:00 UTC−05	Cherundolo (yellow card) 32'; Dempsey 36'; Altidore (yellow card) 42'; Bocanegra (yellow card) 45+1'; Edu (yellow card) 58'; Shea (yellow card) 63'	Report	García (yellow card) 41'; Chávez (yellow card) 78'; Mejía (yellow card) 82'	Stadium: Sun Life Stadium; Attendance: 21,900; Referee: Courtney Campbell (JAM)

October 11 International Friendly	United States	0–1	Ecuador	Harrison, New Jersey
	Bocanegra (yellow card) 62'	Report	Ayovi 79' (yellow card) 88'; Saritama (yellow card) 87'	Stadium: Red Bull Arena; Attendance: 20,707; Referee: Joel Aguilar (ELS)

November 11 International Friendly	France	1–0	United States	Saint-Denis, France
21:00 UTC±0	Rémy 72'; Koscielny (yellow card) 78'; Debuchy (yellow card) 80'	Report		Stadium: Stade de France; Attendance: 70,018; Referee: Michael Koukoulakis (GRE)

November 15 International Friendly	Slovenia	2–3	United States	Ljubljana, Slovenia
	Matavž 26', 62'; Pečnik (yellow card) 90'	Report	Buddle 9'; Dempsey 41'; Altidore 43' (pen.) (yellow card) 90+5'	Stadium: Stožice Stadium; Attendance: 8,140; Referee: Robert Schörgenhofer (AUT)

==== Under-20 ====
March 29 CONCACAF U-20 Champ. Group B	Suriname U-20	0–4	United States U-20	Guatemala City, Guatemala
20:00 UTC−05		Report	Wood 20'; Gyau 29'; Doyle 41'; Rowe 81'	Stadium: Estadio Mateo Flores; Attendance: 3,736; Referee: David Gantar (CAN)

April 2 CONCACAF U-20 Champ. Group B	United States U-20	2–0	Panama U-20	Guatemala City, Guatemala
18:00 UTC−05	Rowe 14', 18'	Report		Stadium: Estadio Mateo Flores; Attendance: 8,500; Referee: Marco Brea (CUB)

April 6 CONCACAF U-20 Champ. QF	United States U-20	1–2	Guatemala U-20	Guatemala City, Guatemala
22:00 UTC−05	Doyle 66'	Report	Lima 33'; Lopez 69'	Stadium: Estadio Mateo Flores; Attendance: 13,805; Referee: Roberto Garcia (MEX)

May 17 Friendly	France U-20	3–3	United States U-20	Carquefou, France
	Tafer 13'; Knockaera 59', 89'	Report	Doyle 8'; Gatt 42'; Gil 54'	Stadium: Stade Moulins

May 20 Friendly	France U-20	2–1	United States U-20	Vichy, France
	Gilles 19'; Tafer 56'	Report	Doyle 22'	Stadium: Stade Vichy

==== Under-18 ====
May 25 Lisbon International Tournament	United States U-18	1–1	Netherlands U-18	Lisbon, Portugal
15:45 UTC+00	Pineda 34'	Report	Peters 58'	Stadium: Estadio Pina Manique; Attendance: 300; Referee: Joao Capela (POR)

May 26 Lisbon International Tournament	Portugal U-18	1–0	United States U-18	Lisbon, Portugal
18:15 UTC+00	Alves 83'	Report		Stadium: Estadio Pina Manique; Attendance: 350; Referee: Jochem Kamphuis (NED)

May 28 Lisbon International Tournament	United States U-18	0–0	Finland U-18	Lisbon, Portugal
		Report

July 25 Milk Cup GS	Israel U-19	0–2	United States U-18	Ballymena, Northern Ireland
18:00 UTC+00		Report	Salgado 53'; Kiesewetter 90+2'	Stadium: Ballymena Showgrounds; Attendance: 1,200

July 27 Milk Cup GS	United States U-18	1–1	Mexico U-19	Coleraine, Northern Ireland
20:00 UTC+00	Robinson 45+1'	Report	Ruiz 12'	Stadium: The Showgrounds; Attendance: 700

July 29 Milk Cup 3PG	United States U-18	2–1	Georgia U-19	Ballymena, Northern Ireland
13:00 UTC+00	McCrary 39'; Kiesewetter 58'	Report	Rukhadze 60'	Stadium: Riada Stadium; Attendance: 300

==== Under-17 ====
January 27 Friendly	Jamaica U-17	0–0	United States U-17	Montego Bay, Jamaica
15:00 UTC−05		Report

January 31 Friendly	Jamaica U-17	1–2	United States U-17	Montego Bay, Jamaica
18:00 UTC−05	Holnes 67'	Report	E. Rodriguez 45' (pen.); Koroma 52'

February 5 Friendly	United States U-17	6–0	Honduras U-17	Bradenton, Florida
	Fehr 20'; Koroma 23', 24', 64'; Guido 32'; Serna 46'	Report

February 14 CONCACAF U-17 Champ. Group B	Cuba U-17	1–3	United States U-17	Montego Bay, Jamaica
15:00 UTC−05	Lopez 68'	Report	Koroma 27'; Oliver 46'; E. Rodriguez 50'	Stadium: Catherine Hall Stadium; Attendance: 548; Referee: Enrico Winjgaarde (SUR)

February 18 CONCACAF U-17 Champ. Group B	United States U-17	1–0	Panama U-17	Montego Bay, Jamaica
16:30 UTC−05	Oliver 50'	Report		Stadium: Jarrett Park; Attendance: 290; Referee: Enrico Winjgaarde (SUR)

February 22 CONCACAF U-17 Champ. QF	United States U-17	3–2 (a.e.t.)	El Salvador U-17	Montego Bay, Jamaica
15:00 UTC−05	Guido 5'; M. Rodriguez 96'; Pelosi 112'	Report	Peña 9'; Iraheta 120' (pen.)	Stadium: Catherine Hall Stadium; Referee: Valdin Legister (JAM)

February 25 CONCACAF U-17 Champ. SF	United States U-17	2–0	Jamaica U-17	Montego Bay, Jamaica
19:00 UTC−05	Pelosi 11'; Oliver 90+2'	Report		Stadium: Catherine Hall Stadium; Attendance: 8,361; Referee: Ricardo Arellano (MEX)

February 27 CONCACAF U-17 Champ. F	Canada U-17	0–3 (a.e.t.)	United States U-17	Montego Bay, Jamaica
19:00 UTC−05		Report	Smith 92'; Oliver 100'; Koroma 120'	Stadium: Catherine Hall Stadium; Attendance: 2,000; Referee: Enrico Winjgaarde (SUR)

April 27 Friendly	Mexico U-17	2–0	United States U-17	Querétaro, Mexico
	Fierra 29'; Bueno 48'	Report		Stadium: Estadio Corregidora

May 1 Friendly	Mexico U-17	1–0	United States U-17	Querétaro, Mexico
	Gonzalez 56'	Report		Stadium: Estadio Corregidora

June 19 FIFA U-17 WC Group D	United States U-17	3–0	Czech Republic U-17	Torreón, Mexico
18:00 UTC−05	Guido 5'; E. Rodriguez 52'; Koroma 89'	Report		Stadium: Estadio Corona; Attendance: 15,083; Referee: Diego Arbal (ARG)

June 22 FIFA U-17 WC Group D	United States U-17	1–2	Uzbekistan U-17	Torreón, Mexico
15:00 UTC−05	Koroma 47'	Report	Davlatov 13'; Makhstaliev 54' (pen.)	Stadium: Estadio Corona; Attendance: 4,133; Referee: Alexey Nikolaev (RUS)

June 25 FIFA U-17 WC Group D	United States U-17	0–0	New Zealand U-17	Pachuca, Mexico
18:00 UTC−05		Report		Stadium: Estadio Hidalgo; Attendance: 8,556; Referee: Bas Nijhuis (NED)

June 30 FIFA U-17 WC R16	Germany U-17	4–0	United States U-17	Querétaro, Mexico
15:00 UTC−05	Guenter 20'; Weiser 40'; Yesil 43'; Ducksch 49'	Report		Stadium: Estadio Corregidora; Attendance: 16,191; Referee: Omar PONCE (ECU)

October 15 Albir Garden Sports Cup	United States U-17	1–1	Mexico U-17	L'Alfàs del Pi, Spain
	Lema 78' (pen.)	Report	Navarro 64'

October 17 Albir Garden Sports Cup	United States U-17	1–1	United Arab Emirates U-17	L'Alfàs del Pi, Spain
		Report

October 19 Albir Garden Sports Cup	United States U-17	2–0	Russia U-17	L'Alfàs del Pi, Spain
		Report

October 20 Albir Garden Sports Cup	Spain U-17	0–5	United States U-17	L'Alfàs del Pi, Spain
		Report

October 25 Val-de-Marne Tournament	France U-17	3–0	United States U-17	Paris, France
14:00 UTC+01		Report

October 27 Val-de-Marne Tournament	United States U-17	1–2	Peru U-17	Paris, France
14:00 UTC+01		Report

October 29 Val-de-Marne Tournament	United States U-17	3–1	Netherlands U-17	Paris, France
14:00 UTC+01		Report

November 30 Nike International Friendlies	United States U-17	2–2	France U-17	Sarasota, Florida
17:00 UTC-05	Robinson 25'; Wade 90+3'	Report	Araai 43'; Turner 75' (o.g.)	Stadium: Premier Sports Campus; Attendance: 300; Referee: Mark Declouet (USA)

December 2 Nike International Friendlies	United States U-17	2–1	Turkey U-17	Sarasota, Florida
17:00 UTC-05	Turner 19'; Flores 88'	Report	Altintas 47'	Stadium: Premier Sports Campus; Attendance: 1,859; Referee: Allen Chapman (USA)

December 4 Nike International Friendlies	United States U-17	3–1	Brazil U-17	Sarasota, Florida
17:00 UTC-05	Rubin 2'; Turner 31'; Wade 43'		Matheus 17'	Stadium: Premier Sports Campus

=== Women ===
==== Senior ====
Wins	Losses	Draws
13	3	4

===== Friendlies =====
April 2	England	2–1	United States	London, England
18:00 UTC+01	Clarke 8'; Yankey 27'	Report	Rapinoe 39'	Stadium: Matchroom Stadium; Attendance: 5,801; Referee: Sian Massey (ENG); Assistant referees: Sarah Hollins (ENG); Rebecca Scott-Mullen (ENG); Fourth official: Lucy May (ENG)

May 14	United States	2–0	Japan	Columbus, Ohio
18:30 UTC-04	Wambach 29'; Rodriguez 37'	Report		Stadium: Columbus Crew Stadium; Attendance: 5,234; Referee: Kari Seitz (USA); Assistant referees: Veronica Perez (USA); Marlene Duffy (USA); Fourth official: Margaret Domka (USA)

May 18	United States	2–0	Japan	Cary, North Carolina
19:00 UTC-04	Rodriguez 28'; O'Reilly 69'	Report		Stadium: WakeMed Soccer Park; Referee: Moo Hackett (USA); Assistant referees: Mark Buda (USA); Daniel Fitzgerald (USA); Fourth official: Larry Stroud Jr. (USA)

June 5	United States	1–0	Mexico	Harrison, New Jersey
14:00 UTC-04	Cheney 90+2'	Report		Stadium: Red Bull Arena; Attendance: 5,852; Referee: Kari Seitz (USA); Assistant referees: Marlene Duffy (USA); Veronica Perez (USA); Fourth official: Christina Ibanez (USA)

September 17	United States	1–1	Canada	Kansas City, Kansas
18:00 UTC-05	Wambach 10' (pen.)	Report	Tancredi 42'	Stadium: Livestrong Sporting Park; Attendance: 16,191; Referee: Margaret Domka (USA); Assistant referees: Marlene Duffy (USA); Melanie Johnson (USA); Fourth official: Jon Freemon (USA)

September 22	United States	3–0	Canada	Portland, Oregon
20:00 UTC-07	Wambach 63', 70'; Morgan 90+2'	Report		Stadium: Jeld-Wen Field; Attendance: 18,570; Referee: Christina Ibanez (USA); Assistant referees: Veronica Perez (USA); Jeremy Hanson (USA); Fourth official: Josh Wilkens (USA)

November 19	United States	1–1	Sweden	Glendale, Arizona
19:00 UTC-06	Heath 81'	Report	Jakobsson 28'	Stadium: University of Phoenix Stadium; Attendance: 18,482; Referee: Kari Seitz (USA); Assistant referees: Veronica Perez (USA); Marlene Duffy (USA); Fourth official: Paul Nothman (USA)

===== 2011 Four Nations Tournament =====
January 21	United States	1–2	Sweden	Chongqing, China
15:35 UTC+08	Lloyd 11'	Report	Segerström 16'; Asllani 61'	Stadium: Yongchuan Sports Centre; Attendance: 16,000; Referee: Qin Liang (CHN); Assistant referees: Zhang Lingling (CHN); Wu Chun (CHN); Fourth official: He Jin (CHN)

January 23	United States	2–1	Canada	Chongqing, China
19:05 UTC+08	Cheney 54'; Tarpley 70'	Report	Tancredi 56'	Stadium: Yongchuan Sports Centre; Attendance: 7,000; Referee: He Jin (CHN); Assistant referees: Fang Yang (CHN); Wu Chun (CHN); Fourth official: Qin Liang (CHN)

January 25	China	0–2	United States	Chongqing, China
19:05 UTC+08		Report	Lloyd 31'; Rodriguez 67'	Stadium: Yongchuan Sports Centre; Referee: Wang Jia (CHN); Assistant referees: Fang Yang (CHN); Cui Yongmei (CHN); Fourth official: Margaret Domka (USA)

===== 2011 Algarve Cup =====
March 2 Group A	United States	2–1	Japan	Vila Real de Santo António, Portugal
15:00 UTC+00	Rodriguez 7'; Rapinoe 18'	Report	Miyama 29'	Stadium: Estádio Municipal; Attendance: 350; Referee: Dagmar Damkova (CZE); Assistant referees: Yolanda Parga Rodriguez (ESP); Maria Luisa Villa Gutierrez (ESP); Fourth official: Alexandra Ihringova (ENG)

March 4 Group A	United States	2–0	Norway	Vila Real de Santo António, Portugal
15:00 UTC+00	Tarpley 33'; Lloyd 63'	Report		Stadium: Estádio Municipal; Attendance: 400; Referee: Hong Eun Ah (KOR); Assistant referees: Sung Mi Cha (KOR); Kyoung Min Kim (KOR); Fourth official: Msui Mei Liu (TPE)

March 7 Group A	United States	4–0	Finland	Quarteira, Portugal
15:00 UTC+00	Boxx 8'; Lloyd 13'; Morgan 45', 54'	Report		Stadium: Estádio Municipal; Attendance: 250; Referee: Jacqui Melksham (AUS); Assistant referees: Allyson Flynn (AUS); Sarah Ho (AUS); Fourth official: Etsuko Fukano (JPN)

March 9 Final	United States	4–2	Iceland	Faro, Portugal
17:00 UTC+00	Lloyd 8'; Cheney 43'; O'Reilly 57'; Morgan 87'	Report	Ómarsdóttir 24'; Gísladóttir 26'	Stadium: Estádio Algarve; Attendance: 1,500; Referee: Bibiana Steinhaus (GER); Assistant referees: Katrin Rafalski (GER); Marina Wozniak (GER); Fourth official: Carol Anne Chenard (CAN)

===== 2011 FIFA Women's World Cup =====
June 28 Group C	United States	2–0	North Korea	Dresden, Germany
18:15 UTC+02	Cheney 54'; Buehler 76'	Report		Stadium: Rudolf-Harbig-Stadion; Attendance: 21,859; Referee: Bibiana Steinhaus (GER); Assistant referees: Marina Wozniak (GER); Katrin Rafalski (GER); Fourth official: Gyoengyi Gaal (HUN)

July 2 Group C	United States	3–0	Colombia	Sinsheim, Germany
18:00 UTC+02	O'Reilly 12'; Rapinoe 50'; Lloyd 57'	Report		Stadium: Rhein-Neckar-Arena; Attendance: 25,475; Referee: Dagmar Damkova (CZE); Assistant referees: Maria Luisa Villa Gutierrez (ESP); Yolanda Parga Rodriguez (ESP); Fourth official: Jacqui Melksham (AUS)

July 6 Group C	Sweden	2–1	United States	Wolfsburg, Germany
20:45 UTC+02	Dahlkvist 16' (pen.); LePeilbet 35' (o.g.)	Report	Wambach 67'	Stadium: Volkswagen-Arena; Attendance: 23,468; Referee: Etsuko Fukano (JPN); Assistant referees: Saori Takahashi (JPN); Zhang Lingling (CHN); Fourth official: Therese Neguel (CMR)

July 10 Quarterfinals	Brazil	2–2 (a.e.t.) (3–5 p)	United States	Dresden, Germany
17:30 UTC+02	Marta 68' (pen.), 92'	Report	Daiane 2' (o.g.); Wambach 120+2'	Stadium: Rudolf-Harbig-Stadion; Attendance: 25,598; Referee: Jacqui Melksham (AUS); Assistant referees: Allyson Flynn (AUS); Sarah Ho (AUS); Fourth official: Etsuko Fukano (JPN)
	Penalties
	Cristiane (penalty scored); Marta (penalty scored); Daiane (penalty missed); Francielle (penalty scored)		(penalty scored) Boxx; (penalty scored) Lloyd; (penalty scored) Wambach; (penalty scored) Rapinoe; (penalty scored) Krieger

July 13 Semifinals	France	1–3	United States	Mönchengladbach, Germany
18:00 UTC+02	Bompastor 55'	Report	Cheney 9'; Wambach 79'; Morgan 82'	Stadium: Borussia-Park; Attendance: 25,676; Referee: Kirsi Heikkinen (FIN); Assistant referees: Tonja Paavola (FIN); Anu Jokela (FIN); Fourth official: Yolanda Parga Rodriguez (ESP)

July 17 Final	Japan	2–2 (a.e.t.) (3–1 p)	United States	Frankfurt, Germany
20:45 UTC+02	Miyama 81'; Sawa 117'	Report	Morgan 69'; Wambach 104'	Stadium: Commerzbank-Arena; Attendance: 48,817; Referee: Bibiana Steinhaus (GER); Assistant referees: Marina Wozniak (GER); Katrin Rafalski (GER); Fourth official: Jenny Palmqvist (SWE)
	Penalties
	Miyama (penalty scored); Nagasato (penalty missed); Sakaguchi (penalty scored); Kumagai (penalty scored)		(penalty missed) Boxx; (penalty missed) Lloyd; (penalty missed) Heath; (penalty scored) Wambach

==== Under-23 ====
February 25 Four Nations Tournament	United States U-23	4–2	Sweden U-23	La Manga, Spain
	Henderson 21', 47'; Nogueira 27' (pen.); Hagen 34'	Report	Berglund 35'; Jakobsson 50'

February 27 Four Nations Tournament	United States U-23	1–1	England U-23	La Manga, Spain
	Hagen 44'	Report	Stokes 62'	Stadium: La Manga Stadium

March 1 Four Nations Tournament	United States U-23	3–2	Norway U-23	La Manga, Spain
	Henderson 71'; Hagen 79'; Nogueira 83'	Report	Lund 17'; Algrey 48'	Stadium: La Manga Field

June 17 3-Nations Tournament	Norway U-23	3–2	United States U-23	Borlänge, Sweden
	Algrey 3'; Adsero 41'; Liane 90'	Report	Brooks 52'; Hagen 76'	Stadium: Kvarnsvedens IP

June 19 3-Nations Tournament	Sweden U-23	0–4	United States U-23	Borlänge, Sweden
		Report	Huster 6'; Hagen 14', 41'; Short 76'	Stadium: Kvarnsvedens IP

June 21 3-Nations Tournament	Sweden U-23	1–1	United States U-23	Falun, Sweden
	Fors 79'	Report	Hagen 60'	Stadium: Kopparvallen

==== Under-20 ====
March 4 Ten Nations Tournament	United States U-20	0 – 0 abandoned	Sweden U-20	La Manga, Spain
		Report

March 6 Ten Nations Tournament	United States U-20	0–0	England U-20	La Manga, Spain
		Report

March 8 Ten Nations Tournament	United States U-20	2–0	Norway U-20	La Manga, Spain
	Cobb 9'; Smith 80'	Report		Stadium: La Manga Club Field A

June 8 Friendly	United States U-20	2–1	Japan U-20	Chula Vista, California
	Cobb 4'; Brian 22'	Report	Saito 13'	Stadium: Olympic Training Center Field 4

==== Under-18 ====
February 1 Friendly	United States U-18	2–1	Germany U-18	Sunrise, Florida
16:00 UTC−05	Spivey 54'; Price 62'	Report	DaBritz 88'

==== Under-17 ====
January 31 Friendly	United States U-17	3–1	Germany U-17	Sunrise, Florida
16:00 UTC−05	Munerlyn 29', 60'; Green 50'	Report	Dongus 82'

February 3 Friendly	United States U-17	2–2	Germany U-17	Sunrise, Florida
	Sullivan 42'; Kaskie 57'	Report	Dongus 30'; Romert 77'

August 25 Friendly	United States U-17	2–2	Japan U-17	Carson, California
18:00 UTC−08	Bruder 51'; Reid 61'	Report	Hirata 43', 45+1'	Stadium: The Home Depot Center; Referee: Shahram Danbeli (USA)

August 28 Friendly	United States U-17	1–2	Japan U-17	Carson, California
16:00 UTC−08	Green 70' (pen.)	Report	Sasaki 24'; Masuya 56'	Stadium: The Home Depot Center; Referee: Robert Sarfarez (USA)

== Managerial changes ==
Team	Outgoing	Manner	Date	Table	Incoming	Date	Table
C.D. Chivas USA	Martín Vásquez	Fired	October 27, 2010	8th (Western Conference); 15th (Overall)	Robin Fraser	January 4, 2011	Pre-season
Chicago Fire	Carlos de los Cobos	Fired	May 30, 2011	8th (Eastern Conference); 16th (Overall)	Frank Klopas	May 30, 2011	8th (Eastern Conference); 16th (Overall)
United States	Bob Bradley	Fired	July 28, 2011	Not Available	Jürgen Klinsmann	July 29, 2011	Not Available
New England Revolution	Steve Nicol	Mutual Consent	October 24, 2011	9th (Eastern Conference); 17th (Overall)	Jay Heaps	November 15, 2011	Postseason
Colorado Rapids	Gary Smith	Fired	November 7, 2011	5th (Western Conference); 6th (Overall)			

== League tables ==
=== Men ===
==== Major League Soccer ====
Pos	Team	Pld	W	L	T	GF	GA	GD	Pts	
1	LA Galaxy (S, C)	34	19	5	10	48	28	+20	67	Qualification for the 2012–13 CONCACAF Champions League group stage
2	Seattle Sounders FC (U)	34	18	7	9	56	37	+19	63	Qualification for the 2012–13 CONCACAF Champions League group stage
3	Real Salt Lake	34	15	11	8	44	36	+8	53	Qualification for the 2012–13 CONCACAF Champions League group stage
4	FC Dallas	34	15	12	7	42	39	+3	52	
5	Sporting Kansas City	34	13	9	12	50	40	+10	51	
6	Houston Dynamo	34	12	9	13	45	41	+4	49	Qualification for the 2012–13 CONCACAF Champions League group stage
7	Colorado Rapids	34	12	9	13	44	41	+3	49	
8	Philadelphia Union	34	11	8	15	44	36	+8	48	
9	Columbus Crew	34	13	13	8	43	44	−1	47	
10	New York Red Bulls	34	10	8	16	50	44	+6	46	
11	Chicago Fire	34	9	9	16	46	45	+1	43	
12	Portland Timbers	34	11	14	9	40	48	−8	42	
13	D.C. United	34	9	13	12	49	52	−3	39	
14	San Jose Earthquakes	34	8	12	14	40	45	−5	38	
15	Chivas USA	34	8	14	12	41	43	−2	36	
16	Toronto FC (V)	34	6	13	15	36	59	−23	33	Qualification for the 2011–12 CONCACAF Champions League preliminary round
17	New England Revolution	34	5	16	13	38	58	−20	28	
18	Vancouver Whitecaps FC	34	6	18	10	35	55	−20	28	

Source: MLS
Rules for classification: 1) points; 2) head-to-head record; 3) goal difference; 4) number of goals scored
(C) MLS Cup champions; (S) Supporters' Shield winners; (U) U.S. Open Cup winners; (V) Canadian Championship winners

===== Playoffs =====
Play-in round
8	Colorado Rapids	1
9	Columbus Crew	0
7	FC Dallas	0
10	New York Red Bulls	2

Conference semifinals
E1	Sporting Kansas City	2	2
WC	Colorado Rapids	0	0
Eastern Conference
E2	Houston Dynamo	2	1
E3	Philadelphia Union	1	0
W1	LA Galaxy	1	2
WC	New York Red Bulls	0	1
Western Conference
W2	Seattle Sounders FC	0	2
W3	Real Salt Lake	3	0

Conference finals
E1	Sporting Kansas City	0
E2	Houston Dynamo	2
W3	Real Salt Lake	1
W1	LA Galaxy	3

MLS Cup
E2	Houston Dynamo	0
W1	LA Galaxy	1

===== MLS Cup =====
November 20
18:00 UTC−06

Los Angeles Galaxy	1–0	Houston Dynamo
Donovan 72'	(Report)

The Home Depot Center, Carson, California
Attendance: 30,281
Referee: Ricardo Salazar

==== North American Soccer League ====
Pos	Team	Pld	W	D	L	GF	GA	GD	Pts	Qualification
1	Carolina RailHawks (X)	28	17	3	8	50	26	+24	54	Playoff semifinals
2	Puerto Rico Islanders	28	15	7	6	41	32	+9	52	Playoff semifinals
3	Tampa Bay Rowdies	28	11	8	9	41	36	+5	41	Playoff quarterfinals
4	Fort Lauderdale Strikers	28	9	11	8	35	36	−1	38	Playoff quarterfinals
5	FC Edmonton	28	10	6	12	35	40	−5	36 (Note: EDM: 8 pts; MIN: 2 pts)	Playoff quarterfinals
6	NSC Minnesota Stars (C)	28	9	9	10	30	32	−2	36	Playoff quarterfinals
7	Montreal Impact	28	9	8	11	35	27	+8	35	
8	Atlanta Silverbacks	28	4	4	20	25	63	−38	16	

Source: NASL Standings
Rules for classification: 1) points; 2) head-to-head record; 3) goal difference; 4) number of goals scored.
(C) Champions; (X) Regular season champion

===== Playoffs =====
Quarterfinals
3	FC Tampa Bay	0
6	NSC Minnesota Stars	1
4	Fort Lauderdale Strikers	5
5	FC Edmonton	0

Semifinals
1	Carolina RailHawks FC	0	4	4 (3)
6	NSC Minnesota Stars	1	3	4 (5)
2	Puerto Rico Islanders	1	1	2
4	Fort Lauderdale Strikers	3	2	5

Soccer Bowl 2011
6	NSC Minnesota Stars	3	0	3
4	Fort Lauderdale Strikers	1	0	1

===== Finals =====
October 22
19:30 UTC−05

NSC Minnesota Stars	3–1	Fort Lauderdale Strikers
Hlavaty 4'; Mulholland 52'; Rodriguez 77'	(Report)	Davis 52' (o.g.)

National Sports Center, Blaine, Minnesota
Attendance: 4,511
October 29
19:30 UTC−04

Fort Lauderdale Strikers	0–0	NSC Minnesota Stars
	(Report)

Lockhart Stadium, Fort Lauderdale, Florida

==== USL Pro ====
===== American Division =====
Pos	Team	Pld	W	T	L	GF	GA	GD	Pts	Qualification
1	Orlando City SC (C)	24	15	6	3	36	16	+20	51	2011 USL Pro Commissioner's Cup, 2011 USL Pro Playoffs
2	Wilmington Hammerheads (A)	24	14	3	7	42	30	+12	45	2011 USL Pro Playoffs (Note: The top four clubs in each division are guaranteed spots in the 2011 USL Pro Playoffs.)
3	Richmond Kickers (A)	24	12	5	7	35	21	+14	41	2011 USL Pro Playoffs
4	Charleston Battery (A)	24	10	5	9	24	25	−1	35	2011 USL Pro Playoffs
5	Charlotte Eagles	24	9	6	9	32	29	+3	33	
6	Antigua Barracuda	24	9	2	13	32	32	0	29	

Source: USL Pro official standings
Rules for classification: Points, then tiebreak: 1) Head-to-head record based on total points in League games, 2) Total wins in League games, 3) Goal difference in League games, 4) Goals scored in League games, etc.
(A) Advances to USL Pro Playoffs; (C) Commissioner's Cup (best regular season record)

===== National Division =====
Pos	Team	Pld	W	T	L	GF	GA	GD	Pts	Qualification
1	Rochester Rhinos (A)	24	12	4	8	31	23	+8	40	2011 USL Pro Playoffs (Note: The top four clubs in each division are guaranteed spots in the 2011 USL PRO Playoffs.)
2	Harrisburg City Islanders (A)	24	10	7	7	37	30	+7	37	2011 USL Pro Playoffs
3	Los Angeles Blues (A)	24	8	9	7	34	29	+5	33	2011 USL Pro Playoffs
4	Pittsburgh Riverhounds (A)	24	7	6	11	23	32	−9	27	2011 USL Pro Playoffs
5	F.C. New York	24	6	7	11	27	37	−10	25	
6	Dayton Dutch Lions	24	2	6	16	21	54	−33	12	

Source: USL Pro official standings
Rules for classification: Points, then tiebreak: 1) Head-to-head record based on total points in League games, 2) Total wins in League games, 3) Goal difference in League games, 4) Goals scored in League games, etc.
(A) Advances to USL Pro Playoffs

====== Playoffs ======
Divisional Semifinals
A1	Orlando City (a.e.t.)	3
A4	Charleston Battery	1
American Division
A2	Wilmington Hammerheads	0 (4)
A3	Richmond Kickers (pen.)	0 (5)
N1	Rochester Rhinos	4
N4	Pittsburgh Riverhounds	0
National Division
N2	Harrisburg City Islanders	3
N3	Los Angeles Blues	2

Divisional Finals
A1	Orlando City	3
A3	Richmond Kickers	0
N1	Rochester Rhinos	1
N2	Harrisburg City Islanders	2

USL PRO Championship
A1	Orlando City (pen.)	2 (3)
N2	Harrisburg City Islanders	2 (2)

====== Final ======
September 3
19:00 UTC−04

Orlando City	2–2 (a.e.t.)	Harrisburg City Islanders
Olum 89'; Neal 116' (pen.)	(Report)	Noone 90+5'; Touray 95'
Penalties
Neal (penalty scored); Álvarez (penalty scored); Campbell (penalty missed); Boden (penalty missed); Jorsling (penalty scored)	3–2	Becerra (penalty missed); Angulo (penalty missed); Noone (penalty scored); Basso (penalty scored); Touray (penalty missed)

Citrus Bowl, Orlando, Florida
Attendance: 11,220
Referee: Matt Bazakos

=== Women ===
==== Women's Professional Soccer ====
Pos	Team	Pld	W	D	L	GF	GA	GD	Pts	Promotion or relegation
1	Western New York Flash	18	13	3	2	40	18	+22	42	Advance to Championship
2	Philadelphia Independence	18	11	3	4	31	18	+13	36	Advance to Super Semifinal
3	magicJack	18	9	2	7	29	29	0	28 (Note: magicJack were deducted a point for various league violations.)	Advance to First round
4	Boston Breakers	18	5	4	9	19	24	−5	19 (Note: BOS: 7 pts; SKY: 4 pt)	Advance to First round
5	Sky Blue FC	18	5	4	9	24	29	−5	19	
6	Atlanta Beat	18	1	4	13	7	32	−25	7	

Updated to match(es) played on unknown. Source: soccerway
Rules for classification: 1) points, 2) goal difference, 3) head-to-head result.

== Lamar Hunt U.S. Open Cup ==
Third round
New York Red Bulls	2
F.C. New York	1
Rochester Rhinos	0
Chicago Fire	1
Columbus Crew	1
Richmond Kickers	2
Sporting Kansas City	3
Chicago Fire Premier	0
FC Dallas	3
Orlando City	2
Real Salt Lake	2
Wilmington Hammerheads	0
Seattle Sounders FC	2
Kitsap Pumas	1
Los Angeles Galaxy	2
Los Angeles Blues	1

Quarterfinals
Chicago Fire	4
New York Red Bulls	0
Sporting Kansas City	0
Richmond Kickers	2
FC Dallas	2
Real Salt Lake	0
Seattle Sounders FC	3
Los Angeles Galaxy	1

Semifinals
Chicago Fire	2
Richmond Kickers	1
Seattle Sounders FC	1
FC Dallas	0

Final
Seattle Sounders FC	2
Chicago Fire	0

Home teams listed on top of bracket. (AET): At Extra Time

=== Final ===
October 4
19:00 UTC−07

Seattle Sounders FC	2–0	Chicago Fire
Montero 77'; Alonso 90+6'	(Report)

CenturyLink Field, Seattle, Washington
Attendance: 35,615
Referee: Alex Prus

== Honors ==
=== Professional ===
Men
Competition		Winner
U.S. Open Cup		Seattle Sounders FC
Major League Soccer	MLS Supporters' Shield	Los Angeles Galaxy
Major League Soccer	MLS Cup	Los Angeles Galaxy
NASL	Regular season	Carolina RailHawks
NASL	Playoffs	NSC Minnesota Stars
USL Pro	Regular season	Orlando City
USL Pro	Playoffs	Orlando City

Women
Competition	Winner
Women's Professional Soccer	Western New York Flash
W-League	Atlanta Silverbacks Women
Women's Premier Soccer League	Orange County Waves

=== Amateur ===
Men
Competition	Team
USL Premier Development League	Kitsap Pumas
National Premier Soccer League	Jacksonville United
NCAA Division I Soccer Championship	North Carolina
NCAA Division II Soccer Championship	Fort Lewis College
NCAA Division III Soccer Championship	Ohio Wesleyan University
NAIA Soccer Championship	Lindsey Wilson (KY)

Women
Competition	Team
NCAA Division I Soccer Championship	Stanford
NCAA Division II Soccer Championship	Saint Rose
NCAA Division III Soccer Championship	Messiah College
NAIA Soccer Championship	Lee University (TN)

== American clubs in international competitions ==
Club	Competition	Final round
Columbus Crew	2010–11 CONCACAF Champions League	Quarterfinals
Real Salt Lake	2010–11 CONCACAF Champions League	Finals
Colorado Rapids	2011–12 CONCACAF Champions League	Group stage
FC Dallas	2011–12 CONCACAF Champions League	Group stage
Los Angeles Galaxy	2011–12 CONCACAF Champions League	Quarterfinals
Seattle Sounders FC	2011–12 CONCACAF Champions League	Quarterfinals

=== Columbus Crew ===
February 22 Champions League; Quarterfinals	Columbus Crew (United States)	0–0	(United States) Real Salt Lake	Columbus, Ohio
20:00 UTC-05		(Report)		Stadium: Columbus Crew Stadium; Attendance: 4,665; Referee: Jair Marrufo (United States)

March 1 Champions League; Quarterfinals	Real Salt Lake (United States)	4–1	(United States) Columbus Crew	Sandy, Utah
19:00 UTC-06	Saborío 23'; Morales 36', 77'; Williams 90+5'	(Report)	Mendoza 49'	Stadium: Rio Tinto Stadium; Attendance: 15,405; Referee: Mark Geiger (United States)

=== Real Salt Lake ===
February 22 Champions League; Quarterfinals	Columbus Crew (United States)	0–0	(United States) Real Salt Lake	Columbus, Ohio
20:00 UTC-05		(Report)		Stadium: Columbus Crew Stadium; Attendance: 4,665; Referee: Jair Marrufo (United States)

March 1 Champions League; Quarterfinals	Real Salt Lake (United States)	4–1	(United States) Columbus Crew	Sandy, Utah
19:00 UTC-06	Saborío 23'; Morales 36', 77'; Williams 90+5'	(Report)	Mendoza 49'	Stadium: Rio Tinto Stadium; Attendance: 15,405; Referee: Mark Geiger (United States)

March 15 Champions League; Semifinals	Real Salt Lake (United States)	2–0	(Costa Rica) Saprissa	Sandy, Utah
19:00 UTC-05	Saborío 9'; Espíndola 57'	(Report)		Stadium: Rio Tinto Stadium; Attendance: 16,668; Referee: Enrico Wijngaarde (Suriname)

April 5 Champions League; Semifinals	Saprissa (Costa Rica)	2–1	(United States) Real Salt Lake	San José, Costa Rica
20:00 UTC-06	Cordero 46'; Solís 87' (pen.)	(Report)	Olave 61'	Stadium: Estadio Ricardo Saprissa Aymá; Attendance: 21,065; Referee: Marco Antonio Rodríguez (Mexico)

April 20 Champions League; Final	Monterrey (Mexico)	2–2	(United States) Real Salt Lake	Monterrey, Mexico
21:00 UTC-05	de Nigris 18'; Suazo 62' (pen.)	(Report)	Borchers 35'; Morales 89'	Stadium: Estadio Tecnológico; Attendance: 30,247; Referee: Joel Aguilar (El Salvador)

April 27 Champions League; Final	Real Salt Lake (United States)	0–1	(Mexico) Monterrey	Sandy, Utah
20:00 UTC-06		(Report)	Suazo 45'	Stadium: Rio Tinto Stadium; Attendance: 20,738; Referee: Roberto Moreno (Panama)

=== Colorado Rapids ===
August 17 Champions League; Group B	Colorado Rapids (United States)	3–2	(El Salvador) Isidro Metapán	Commerce City, Colorado
20:00 UTC-06	Kandji 16', 45'; Akpan 50'	Report	Kardeck 2' (pen.); Suárez 25'	Stadium: Dick's Sporting Goods Park; Attendance: 4,165; Referee: Trevor Taylor (BAR)

August 23 Champions League; Group B	Real España (Honduras)	1–1	(United States) Colorado Rapids	San Pedro Sula, Honduras
20:00 UTC-06	Rodríguez 87'	Report	Larentowicz 45+1'	Stadium: Estadio Francisco Morazán; Attendance: 5,841; Referee: Roberto García (MEX)

September 13 Champions League; Group B	Colorado Rapids (United States)	1–4	(Mexico) Santos Laguna	Commerce City, Colorado
20:00 UTC-06	Mullan 77'	Report	Ludueña 14'; Peralta 27'; Quintero 64'; Suárez 71'	Stadium: Dick's Sporting Goods Park; Attendance: 9,760; Referee: Roberto Moreno (PAN)

September 21 Champions League; Group B	Colorado Rapids (United States)	1–2	(Honduras) Real España	Commerce City, Colorado
20:00 UTC-06	Akpan 18'	Report	Pavón 12', 33'	Stadium: Dick's Sporting Goods Park; Attendance: 4,512; Referee: Enrico Wijngaarde (SUR)

September 28 Champions League; Group B	Isidro Metapán (El Salvador)	1–3	(United States) Colorado Rapids	Metapán, El Salvador
20:00 UTC-06	Pacheco 36'	Report	Ababio 31'; Amarikwa 49'; Cummings 77'	Stadium: Estadio Jorge Calero Suárez; Attendance: 1,920; Referee: Raúl Castro (HON)

October 19 Champions League; Group B	Santos Laguna (Mexico)	2–0	(United States) Colorado Rapids	Torreón, Mexico
19:00 UTC-05	Galindo 55'; Escoboza 67'	Report		Stadium: Estadio Corona; Attendance: 6,000; Referee: Courtney Campbell (JAM)

=== FC Dallas ===
July 28 Champions League; Preliminary round	Alianza (El Salvador)	0–1	(United States) FC Dallas	San Salvador, El Salvador
20:00 UTC-06		(Report)	Gonçalvez 70'	Stadium: Estadio Cuscatlán; Attendance: 3,500; Referee: David Gantar (Canada)

August 3 Champions League; Preliminary round	FC Dallas (United States)	1–0	(El Salvador) Alianza	Frisco, Texas
19:00 UTC-05	Ihemelu 37'	(Report)		Stadium: Pizza Hut Park; Attendance: 3,400; Referee: Enrico Wijngaarde (Suriname)

August 17 Champions League; Group C	UNAM (Mexico)	0–1	(United States) FC Dallas	Mexico City, Mexico
21:00 UTC-05		Report	Chávez 66'	Stadium: Estadio Olímpico Universitario; Attendance: 4,000; Referee: José Molina (Honduras)

August 25 Champions League; Group C	Toronto FC (Canada)	0–1	(United States) FC Dallas	Toronto, Ontario, Canada
10:15 UTC-04		Report	Stewart 45+1'	Stadium: BMO Field; Attendance: 500; Referee: Javier Santos (Puerto Rico)

September 14 Champions League; Group C	FC Dallas (United States)	1–1	(Panama) Tauro	Frisco, Texas
19:00 UTC-05	Cruz 1'	Report	Moreno 41' (pen)	Stadium: Pizza Hut Park; Attendance: 3,001; Referee: Wálter Quesada (Costa Rica)

September 21 Champions League; Group C	FC Dallas (United States)	0–2	(Mexico) UNAM	Frisco, Texas
19:00 UTC-05		Report	Herrera 84'; Izazola 90+1'	Stadium: Pizza Hut Park; Attendance: 4,985; Referee: Walter López (GUA)

September 28 Champions League; Group C	Tauro (Panama)	5–3	(United States) FC Dallas	Panama City, Panama
19:00 UTC-05	Moreno 12'; Gallardo 33'; Pérez 77', 86'; Sánchez 81'	Report	Benítez 23' (pen.); Luna 84', 90+3' (pen.)	Stadium: Estadio Rommel Fernández; Attendance: 316; Referee: Marco Rodríguez (MEX)

October 18 Champions League; Group C	FC Dallas (United States)	0–3	(Canada) Toronto FC	Frisco, Texas
19:00 UTC-05		Report	Koevermans 29'; Plata 69', 81'	Stadium: Pizza Hut Park; Referee: Roberto Garcia (MEX)

=== Los Angeles Galaxy ===
August 16 Champions League; Group A	Los Angeles Galaxy (United States)	2–0	(Honduras) Motagua	Carson, California
19:00 UTC-07	Cristman 13'; Donovan 60'	Report		Stadium: The Home Depot Center; Attendance: 8,196; Referee: Enrico Wijngaarde (SUR)

August 25 Champions League; Group A	Los Angeles Galaxy (United States)	2–0	(Costa Rica) Alajuelense	Carson, California
19:00 UTC-07	Gonzalez 38'; Barrett 77'	Report		Stadium: The Home Depot Center; Referee: Marco Antonio Rodríguez (MEX)

September 13 Champions League; Group A	Morelia (Mexico)	2–1	(United States) Los Angeles Galaxy	Morelia, Mexico
18:00 UTC-06	Aldrete 83'; Sabah 90+2'	Report	Keane 52'	Stadium: Estadio Morelos; Attendance: 16,000; Referee: José Pineda (HON)

September 21 Champions League; Group A	Alajuelense (Costa Rica)	1–0	(United States) Los Angeles Galaxy	Alajuela, Costa Rica
20:00 UTC-06	Gabas 28'	Report		Stadium: Estadio Alejandro Morera Soto; Attendance: 13,377; Referee: Courtney Campbell (JAM)

September 28 Champions League; Group A	Los Angeles Galaxy (United States)	2–1	(Mexico) Morelia	Carson, California
19:00 UTC-07	Magee 21'; Juninho 90+1'	Report	Márquez Lugo 59'	Stadium: The Home Depot Center; Attendance: 7,500; Referee: Joel Aguilar (SLV)

October 20 Champions League; Group A	Motagua (Honduras)	0–1	(United States) Los Angeles Galaxy	Tegucigalpa, Honduras
20:00 UTC-06		Report	Juninho 29'	Stadium: Estadio Tiburcio Carías Andino; Attendance: 14,000; Referee: Walter López (GUA)

=== Seattle Sounders ===
July 26 Champions League; Preliminary round	San Francisco (Panama)	1–0	(United States) Seattle Sounders FC	Panama City, Panama
19:00 UTC-05	Brown 28'	(Report)		Stadium: Estadio Rommel Fernández; Attendance: 700; Referee: David España (Guatemala)

August 3 Champions League; Preliminary round	Seattle Sounders FC (United States)	2–0 (a.e.t.)	(Panama) San Francisco	Seattle, Washington
19:00 UTC-07	Fernández 41'; Jaqua 98'	(Report)		Stadium: CenturyLink Field; Attendance: 21,233; Referee: Jeffrey Solis (Costa Rica)

August 16 Champions League; Group D	Seattle Sounders FC (United States)	4–1	(Guatemala) Comunicaciones	Seattle, Washington
19:00 UTC-07	Evans 35'; Fucito 61', 67'; Gómez 87' (o.g.)	Report	Arreola 2'	Stadium: CenturyLink Field; Attendance: 10,017; Referee: Paul Delgadillo (Mexico)

August 23 Champions League; Group D	Monterrey (Mexico)	0–1	(United States) Seattle Sounders FC	Monterrey, Mexico
19:00 UTC-05		Report	Fernández 38'	Stadium: Estadio Tecnológico; Attendance: 10,234; Referee: Elmar Rodas (Guatemala)

September 14 Champions League; Group D	Herediano (Costa Rica)	1–2	(United States) Seattle Sounders FC	San José, Costa Rica
20:00 UTC-06	Cancela 45+1' (pen)	Report	Montero 3', 54'	Stadium: Estadio Nacional de Costa Rica; Attendance: 514; Referee: Jafeth Perea (Panama)

September 20 Champions League; Group D	Seattle Sounders FC (United States)	0–1	(Costa Rica) Herediano	Seattle, Washington
19:00 UTC-07		Report	Arias 25'	Stadium: CenturyLink Field; Attendance: 10,163; Referee: Neal Brizan (TRI)

September 27 Champions League; Group D	Comunicaciones (Guatemala)	2–2	(United States) Seattle Sounders FC	Guatemala City, Guatemala
20:00 UTC-06	Montepeque 7'; R. Morales 64'	Report	Alonso 44', 89'	Stadium: Estadio Cementos Progreso; Attendance: 4,500; Referee: Roberto Garcia (MEX)

October 18 Champions League; Group D	Seattle Sounders FC (United States)	1–2	(Mexico) Monterrey	Seattle, Washington
19:00 UTC-07	Montero 42'	Report	Carreño 3'; Delgado 60'	Stadium: CenturyLink Field; Attendance: 15,866; Referee: Enrico Wijngaarde (SUR)
