= 2012 CONCACAF Champions League final =

- Event: 2011–12 CONCACAF Champions League
Monterrey	Santos Laguna
(Mexico)	(Mexico)
3	2
- on aggregate

First leg
Monterrey	Santos Laguna
2	0
- Date: 18 April 2012
- Venue: Estadio Tecnológico, Monterrey
- Referee: Francisco Chacón (Mexico)
- Attendance: 29,300

Second leg
Santos Laguna	Monterrey
2	1
- Date: 25 April 2012
- Venue: Estadio Corona, Torreón
- Referee: Roberto García (Mexico)
- Attendance: 28,000

The 2012 CONCACAF Champions League final was the final of the 2011–12 CONCACAF Champions League, the 4th edition of the CONCACAF Champions League under its current format, and overall the 47th edition of the premium football club competition organized by CONCACAF, the regional governing body of North America, Central America, and the Caribbean.

The final was contested in a two-leg aggregate format on 18 and 25 April 2012, between two Mexican teams, Monterrey and Santos Laguna. After winning the first leg 2–0, a 2–1 loss in the second leg gave Monterrey the title 3–2 on aggregate. As a result, Monterrey earned the right to represent CONCACAF at the 2012 FIFA Club World Cup, entering at the quarterfinal stage.

== Background ==
For the third time in four seasons of the CONCACAF Champions League, the final was played between two Mexican sides. This guaranteed a Mexican champion for the seventh straight year and 28th time since the confederation began staging the tournament in 1962 (including the tournament's predecessor, the CONCACAF Champions' Cup).

Monterrey were the defending champions, winning the title in 2010–11 after beating Real Salt Lake in the final. They defeated two Mexican sides in the knockout round.

Santos Laguna's previous best record was in 2008–09 when they reached the semifinals. Santos Laguna defeated two teams from Major League Soccer in the knockout round, scoring 6 goals in each of the two home victories.

Both teams qualified for the CONCACAF Champions League tournament by reaching the final of the Torneo Apertura 2010 in which Monterrey won with a score of 5–3.

== Road to the final ==
(Mexico) Monterrey				Round	(Mexico) Santos Laguna			
Opponent	Agg.	1st leg	2nd leg	Preliminary round	Opponent	Agg.	1st leg	2nd leg
Bye				Preliminary round	(Honduras) Olimpia	4–3	3–1 (H)	1–2 (A)
Opponent	Result			Group stage	Opponent	Result		
(Costa Rica) Herediano	5–0 (A)			Matchday 1	(Honduras) Real España	3–2 (H)		
(United States) Seattle Sounders FC	0–1 (H)			Matchday 2	(El Salvador) Isidro Metapán	0–2 (A)		
(Guatemala) Comunicaciones	0–1 (A)			Matchday 3	(United States) Colorado Rapids	4–1 (A)		
(Guatemala) Comunicaciones	3–1 (H)			Matchday 4	(El Salvador) Isidro Metapán	6–0 (H)		
(Costa Rica) Herediano	1–0 (H)			Matchday 5	(Honduras) Real España	1–1 (A)		
(United States) Seattle Sounders FC	2–1 (A)			Matchday 6	(United States) Colorado Rapids	2–0 (H)		
Group D winner: Team / Pld / W / D / L / GF / GA / GD / Pts; (Mexico) Monterrey / 6 / 4 / 0 / 2 / 11 / 4 / +7 / 12; (United States) Seattle Sounders FC / 6 / 3 / 1 / 2 / 10 / 7 / +3 / 10; (Guatemala) Comunicaciones / 6 / 2 / 1 / 3 / 8 / 13 / −5 / 7; (Costa Rica) Herediano / 6 / 2 / 0 / 4 / 6 / 11 / −5 / 6				Final standings	Group B winner: Team / Pld / W / D / L / GF / GA / GD / Pts; (Mexico) Santos Laguna / 6 / 4 / 1 / 1 / 16 / 6 / +10 / 13; (El Salvador) Isidro Metapán / 6 / 3 / 0 / 3 / 10 / 15 / −5 / 9; (United States) Colorado Rapids / 6 / 2 / 1 / 3 / 9 / 12 / −3 / 7; (Honduras) Real España / 6 / 1 / 2 / 3 / 9 / 11 / −2 / 5			
Opponent	Agg.	1st leg	2nd leg	Championship round	Opponent	Agg.	1st leg	2nd leg
(Mexico) Morelia	7–2	3–1 (A)	4–1 (H)	Quarterfinals	(United States) Seattle Sounders FC	7–3	1–2 (A)	6–1 (H)
(Mexico) UNAM	4–1	3–0 (H)	1–1 (A)	Semifinals	(Canada) Toronto FC	7–3	1–1 (A)	6–2 (H)

== Rules ==
Like other match-ups in the knockout round, the teams played two games, one at each team's home stadium. If the teams remained tied after 90 minutes of play during the 2nd leg, the away goals rule would be used, but not after a tie enters extra time, and so a tie would be decided by penalty shootout if the aggregate score is level after extra time.

== Final summary ==
=== First leg ===
18 April 2012
21:00 UTC−05:00

Monterrey (Mexico)	2–0	(Mexico) Santos Laguna
Suazo 60', 86'	Report

Estadio Tecnológico, Monterrey
Attendance: 29,300
Referee: Francisco Chacón (Mexico)

Monterrey	Santos Laguna

MONTERREY:
GK	1	(Mexico) Jonathan Orozco
RB	2	(Mexico) Severo Meza
CB	15	(Argentina) José María Basanta
CB	21	(Mexico) Hiram Mier
LB	5	(Mexico) Dárvin Chávez
CM	8	(Mexico) Luis Ernesto Pérez (c)
CM	17	(Mexico) Jesús Zavala		(substituted off) 58'
CM	10	(Mexico) Ángel Reyna
RF	7	(Chile) Humberto Suazo	(yellow card) 4'
CF	9	(Mexico) Aldo de Nigris		(substituted off) 88'
LF	18	(Argentina) Neri Cardozo	(yellow card) 10'	(substituted off) 71'
Substitutes:
FW	13	(Mexico) Darío Carreño		(substituted on) 58'
MF	20	(Ecuador) Walter Ayoví		(substituted on) 71'
DF	6	(Mexico) Héctor Morales		(substituted on) 88'
Manager:
(Mexico) Víctor Manuel Vucetich

SANTOS LAGUNA:
GK	1	(Mexico) Oswaldo Sánchez (c)
RB	23	(Panama) Felipe Baloy	(yellow card) 40'
CB	5	(Mexico) Aarón Galindo
CB	4	(Mexico) Jorge Iván Estrada
LB	20	(Mexico) Osmar Mares	(yellow card) 73'
DM	8	(Mexico) Juan Pablo Rodríguez
CM	6	(Spain) Marc Crosas		(substituted off) 86'
CM	37	(Mexico) Cándido Ramírez		(substituted off) 63'
FW	16	(United States) Herculez Gomez
FW	3	(Colombia) Carlos Quintero		(substituted off) 83'
FW	13	(Ecuador) Christian Suárez
Substitutes:
DF	28	(Mexico) Carlos Adrián Morales		(substituted on) 63'
MF	10	(Argentina) Daniel Ludueña		(substituted on) 83'
MF	17	(Mexico) Rodolfo Salinas	(yellow card) 88'	(substituted on) 86'
Manager:
(Mexico) Benjamín Galindo

Assistant referees:
Marvin Torrentera (Mexico)
Marcos Quintero (Mexico)
Fourth official:
Ricardo Arellano (Mexico)

=== Second leg ===
25 April 2012
19:00 UTC−05:00

Santos Laguna (Mexico)	2−1	(Mexico) Monterrey
Ludueña 45+3'; Peralta 51'	Report	Cardozo 82'

Estadio Corona, Torreón
Attendance: 28,000
Referee: Roberto García (Mexico)

Santos Laguna	Monterrey

SANTOS LAGUNA:
GK	1	(Mexico) Oswaldo Sánchez (c)
RB	19	(Mexico) Rafael Figueroa
CB	5	(Mexico) Aarón Galindo
CB	4	(Mexico) Jorge Iván Estrada
LB	14	(Mexico) César Ibáñez
DM	8	(Mexico) Juan Pablo Rodríguez
CM	10	(Argentina) Daniel Ludueña	(yellow card) 45+2'	(substituted off) 57'
CM	17	(Mexico) Rodolfo Salinas		(substituted off) 84'
FW	24	(Mexico) Oribe Peralta
FW	3	(Colombia) Carlos Quintero
FW	13	(Ecuador) Christian Suárez		(substituted off) 73'
Substitutes:
MF	16	(United States) Herculez Gómez		(substituted on) 57'
DF	28	(Mexico) Carlos Adrián Morales		(substituted on) 73'
MF	10	(Mexico) Cándido Ramírez		(substituted on) 84'
Manager:
(Mexico) Benjamín Galindo

MONTERREY:
GK	1	(Mexico) Jonathan Orozco	(yellow card) 7'
RB	2	(Mexico) Severo Meza
CB	15	(Argentina) José María Basanta
CB	21	(Mexico) Hiram Mier
LB	5	(Mexico) Dárvin Chávez
CM	8	(Mexico) Luis Ernesto Pérez (c)	(yellow card) 90+1'
CM	17	(Mexico) Jesús Zavala	(yellow card) 33'
CM	10	(Mexico) Ángel Reyna		(substituted off) 65'
RF	19	(Argentina) César Delgado		(substituted off) 84'
CF	9	(Mexico) Aldo de Nigris	(yellow card) 5'	(substituted off) 87'
LF	18	(Argentina) Neri Cardozo
Substitutes:
MF	20	(Ecuador) Walter Ayoví		(substituted on) 65'
FW	13	(Mexico) Darío Carreño		(substituted on) 84'
DF	6	(Mexico) Héctor Morales		(substituted on) 87'
Manager:
(Mexico) Víctor Manuel Vucetich

Assistant referees:
José Luis Camargo (Mexico)
Alberto Morín (Mexico)
Fourth official:
Mauricio Morales (Mexico)
