= 2011–12 CONCACAF Champions League group stage =

The 2011–12 CONCACAF Champions League group stage were played from August to October 2011. The matchdays were August 16–18, August 23–25, September 13–15, September 20–22, September 27–29, and October 18–20, 2011.

The draw for the preliminary round and the group stage was held on May 18, 2011, at the CONCACAF headquarters in New York City. Teams from the same association (excluding "wildcard" teams which replace a team from another association) may not be drawn with each other.

A total of 16 teams competed, which include 8 automatic qualifiers and 8 winners of the preliminary round. The teams were divided into four groups of four, where each team played each other home-and-away in a round-robin format. The top two teams of each group advanced to the championship round.

== Tiebreakers ==
If two teams are tied on points, the following tie-breaking criteria shall be applied, in order, to determine the ranking of teams:

1. Greater number of points earned in matches between the teams concerned
2. Greater goal difference in matches between the teams concerned
3. Greater number of goals scored away from home in matches between the teams concerned
4. Reapply first three criteria if two or more teams are still tied
5. Greater goal difference in all group matches
6. Greater number of goals scored in group matches
7. Greater number of goals scored away in all group matches
8. Drawing of lots

== Groups ==
The schedule of the first two rounds was released on July 28, 2011, by CONCACAF. The remainder of the schedule was announced on August 9, 2011, following the conclusion of the preliminary round.

All Times U.S. Eastern Daylight Time (UTC−04:00)

=== Group A ===
Team	Pld	W	D	L	GF	GA	GD	Pts	Qualification	LA	MOR	ALA	MOT
(United States) Los Angeles Galaxy	6	4	0	2	8	4	+4	12 (Note: Tiebreakers: Los Angeles Galaxy, Morelia and Alajuelense are ranked by their head-to-head records.)	Advance to championship round		2–1	2–0	2–0
(Mexico) Morelia	6	4	0	2	11	5	+6	12	Advance to championship round	2–1		2–1	4–0
(Costa Rica) Alajuelense	6	4	0	2	8	6	+2	12		1–0	1–0		1–0
(Honduras) Motagua	6	0	0	6	2	14	−12	0		0–1	0–2	2–4	

Notes:

Tiebreaker
Team	Pld	W	D	L	GF	GA	GD	Pts
(United States) Los Angeles Galaxy	4	2	0	2	5	4	+1	6 (Note: All three teams have 6 head-to-head points, and so are ranked by head-to-head goal difference: Los Angeles Galaxy (+1), Morelia (0), Alajuelense (−1).)
(Mexico) Morelia	4	2	0	2	5	5	0	6
(Costa Rica) Alajuelense	4	2	0	2	3	4	−1	6

Notes:
August 16, 2011
22:00

Los Angeles Galaxy (United States)	2–0	(Honduras) Motagua
Cristman 13'; Donovan 60'	Report

The Home Depot Center, Carson
Attendance: 8,196
Referee: Enrico Wijngaarde (Suriname)
August 16, 2011
22:00

Alajuelense (Costa Rica)	1–0	(Mexico) Morelia
McDonald 77'	Report

Estadio Alejandro Morera Soto, Alajuela
Attendance: 7,000
Referee: Roberto Moreno (Panama)

August 25, 2011
22:00

Los Angeles Galaxy (United States)	2–0	(Costa Rica) Alajuelense
Gonzalez 38'; Barrett 77'	Report

The Home Depot Center, Carson
Attendance: 9,855
Referee: Marco Rodríguez (Mexico)
August 25, 2011
22:00

Morelia (Mexico)	4–0	(Honduras) Motagua
Márquez Lugo 2'; Rojas 50'; Jiménez 70'; Lugo 72'	Report

Estadio Morelos, Morelia
Attendance: 5,463
Referee: Elmer Bonilla (El Salvador)

September 13, 2011
20:00

Morelia (Mexico)	2–1	(United States) Los Angeles Galaxy
Aldrete 83'; Sabah 90+2'	Report	Keane 52'

Estadio Morelos, Morelia
Attendance: 16,000
Referee: Benigno Pineda (Honduras)
September 15, 2011
22:00

Motagua (Honduras)	2–4	(Costa Rica) Alajuelense
Bengtson 5'; Guevara 68'	Report	Valle 41'; McDonald 51'; Guevara 84', 86'

Estadio Tiburcio Carías Andino, Tegucigalpa
Attendance: 1,928
Referee: Paul Delgadillo (Mexico)

September 21, 2011
22:00

Alajuelense (Costa Rica)	1–0	(United States) Los Angeles Galaxy
Gabas 28'	Report

Estadio Alejandro Morera Soto, Alajuela
Attendance: 13,377
Referee: Courtney Campbell (Jamaica)
September 22, 2011
22:00

Motagua (Honduras)	0–2	(Mexico) Morelia
	Report	Corona 55'; Manso 58'

Estadio Tiburcio Carías Andino, Tegucigalpa
Attendance: 1,752
Referee: Javier Santos (Puerto Rico)

September 28, 2011
22:00

Los Angeles Galaxy (United States)	2–1	(Mexico) Morelia
Magee 21'; Juninho 90+1'	Report	Márquez Lugo 59'

The Home Depot Center, Carson
Attendance: 7,500
Referee: Joel Aguilar (El Salvador)
September 29, 2011
22:00

Alajuelense (Costa Rica)	1–0	(Honduras) Motagua
McDonald 27'	Report

Estadio Alejandro Morera Soto, Alajuela
Attendance: 9,099
Referee: Valdin Legister (Jamaica)

October 18, 2011
20:00

Morelia (Mexico)	2–1	(Costa Rica) Alajuelense
Rojas 56'; Sabah 59'	Report	Gabas 36'

Estadio Morelos, Morelia
Attendance: 15,000
Referee: Roberto Moreno (Panama)
October 20, 2011
22:00

Motagua (Honduras)	0–1	(United States) Los Angeles Galaxy
	Report	Juninho 29'

Estadio Tiburcio Carías Andino, Tegucigalpa
Attendance: 14,000
Referee: Walter López (Guatemala)

=== Group B ===
Team	Pld	W	D	L	GF	GA	GD	Pts	Qualification	SAN	MET	COL	REA
(Mexico) Santos Laguna	6	4	1	1	16	6	+10	13	Advance to championship round		6–0	2–0	3–2
(El Salvador) Isidro Metapán	6	3	0	3	10	15	−5	9	Advance to championship round	2–0		1–3	3–2
(United States) Colorado Rapids	6	2	1	3	9	12	−3	7		1–4	3–2		1–2
(Honduras) Real España	6	1	2	3	9	11	−2	5		1–1	1–2	1–1	

August 16, 2011
20:00

Santos Laguna (Mexico)	3–2	(Honduras) Real España
Enríquez 28'; Bica 51' (o.g.); Suárez 74'	Report	Delgado 42'; Lalín 68'

Estadio Corona, Torreón
Attendance: 5,500
Referee: Wálter Quesada (Costa Rica)
August 17, 2011
22:00

Colorado Rapids (United States)	3–2	(El Salvador) Isidro Metapán
Kandji 16', 45'; Akpan 50'	Report	Kardeck 2' (pen.); Suárez 25'

Dick's Sporting Goods Park, Commerce City
Attendance: 4,165
Referee: Trevor Taylor (Barbados)

August 23, 2011
22:00

Real España (Honduras)	1–1	(United States) Colorado Rapids
Rodríguez 87'	Report	Larentowicz 45+1'

Estadio Francisco Morazán, San Pedro Sula
Attendance: 5,841
Referee: Roberto García (Mexico)
August 24, 2011
22:00

Isidro Metapán (El Salvador)	2–0	(Mexico) Santos Laguna
Suárez 45'; Bautista 52'	Report

Estadio Jorge Calero Suárez, Metapán
Attendance: 3,260
Referee: Raymond Bogle (Jamaica)

September 13, 2011
22:00

Real España (Honduras)	1–2	(El Salvador) Isidro Metapán
Pavón 80' (pen.)	Report	Aquino 8'; Kardeck 57'

Estadio Francisco Morazán, San Pedro Sula
Attendance: 3,358
Referee: Walter López (Guatemala)
September 13, 2011
22:00

Colorado Rapids (United States)	1–4	(Mexico) Santos Laguna
Mullan 77'	Report	Ludueña 14'; Peralta 27'; Quintero 64'; Suárez 71'

Dick's Sporting Goods Park, Commerce City
Attendance: 9,760
Referee: Roberto Moreno (Panama)

September 21, 2011
22:00

Colorado Rapids (United States)	1–2	(Honduras) Real España
Akpan 18'	Report	Pavón 12', 33'

Dick's Sporting Goods Park, Commerce City
Attendance: 4,512
Referee: Enrico Wijngaarde (Suriname)
September 22, 2011
20:00

Santos Laguna (Mexico)	6–0	(El Salvador) Isidro Metapán
Cárdenas 21'; Quintero 28', 55'; Peralta 38', 86'; Ochoa 79'	Report

Estadio Corona, Torreón
Attendance: 5,500
Referee: David Gantar (Canada)

September 28, 2011
20:00

Real España (Honduras)	1–1	(Mexico) Santos Laguna
Mario Martínez 61'	Report	Ochoa 51'

Estadio Francisco Morazán, San Pedro Sula
Attendance: 6,296
Referee: Elmar Rodas (Guatemala)
September 28, 2011
22:00

Isidro Metapán (El Salvador)	1–3	(United States) Colorado Rapids
Pacheco 36'	Report	Ababio 31'; Amarikwa 49'; Cummings 77'

Estadio Jorge Calero Suárez, Metapán
Attendance: 1,920
Referee: Raúl Castro (Honduras)

October 19, 2011
20:00

Santos Laguna (Mexico)	2–0	(United States) Colorado Rapids
Galindo 55'; Escoboza 67'	Report

Estadio Corona, Torreón
Attendance: 6,000
Referee: Courtney Campbell (Jamaica)
October 20, 2011
20:00

Isidro Metapán (El Salvador)	3–2	(Honduras) Real España
Suárez 50', 82'; Sánchez 68'	Report	Delgado 56'; Maynor Martínez 90+2'

Estadio Jorge Calero Suárez, Metapán
Attendance: 2,020
Referee: Wálter Quesada (Costa Rica)

=== Group C ===
Team	Pld	W	D	L	GF	GA	GD	Pts	Qualification	UNAM	TOR	DAL	TAU
(Mexico) UNAM	6	3	2	1	8	2	+6	11	Advance to championship round		4–0	0–1	1–0
(Canada) Toronto FC	6	3	1	2	7	7	0	10	Advance to championship round	1–1		0–1	1–0
(United States) FC Dallas	6	2	1	3	6	11	−5	7		0–2	0–3		1–1
(Panama) Tauro	6	1	2	3	7	8	−1	5		0–0	1–2	5–3	

August 17, 2011
22:00

UNAM (Mexico)	0–1	(United States) FC Dallas
	Report	Chávez 66'

Estadio Olímpico Universitario, Mexico City
Attendance: 4,000
Referee: José Molina (Honduras)
August 18, 2011
20:00

Tauro (Panama)	1–2	(Canada) Toronto FC
Moreno 76' (pen.)	Report	Johnson 21'; De Guzman 24'

Estadio Rommel Fernández, Panama City
Attendance: 1,905
Referee: Marcos Brea (Cuba)

August 25, 2011^{1}
10:15

Toronto FC (Canada)	0–1	(United States) FC Dallas
	Report	Stewart 45+1'

BMO Field, Toronto
Attendance: 500
Referee: Javier Santos (Puerto Rico)
August 25, 2011
20:00

Tauro (Panama)	0–0	(Mexico) UNAM
	Report

Estadio Rommel Fernández, Panama City
Attendance: 1,621
Referee: Mauricio Navarro (Canada)

September 14, 2011
20:00

FC Dallas (United States)	1–1	(Panama) Tauro
Cruz 1'	Report	Moreno 41' (pen.)

Pizza Hut Park, Frisco
Attendance: 3,001
Referee: Wálter Quesada (Costa Rica)
September 14, 2011
20:00

UNAM (Mexico)	4–0	(Canada) Toronto FC
Bravo 17', 33', 42'; Velarde 21'	Report

Estadio Olímpico Universitario, Mexico City
Attendance: 3,382
Referee: Raymond Bogle (Jamaica)

September 20, 2011
20:00

Toronto FC (Canada)	1–0	(Panama) Tauro
Koevermans 40'	Report

BMO Field, Toronto
Attendance: 10,132
Referee: Terry Vaughn (United States)
September 21, 2011
20:00

FC Dallas (United States)	0–2	(Mexico) UNAM
	Report	Herrera 84'; Izazola 90+1'

Pizza Hut Park, Frisco
Attendance: 4,985
Referee: Walter López (Guatemala)

September 27, 2011
20:00

Toronto FC (Canada)	1–1	(Mexico) UNAM
Marošević 35'	Report	Palacios 51'

BMO Field, Toronto
Attendance: 9,115
Referee: Neal Brizan (Trinidad and Tobago)
September 28, 2011
20:00

Tauro (Panama)	5–3	(United States) FC Dallas
Moreno 12'; Gallardo 33'; T. Pérez 77', 86'; Sánchez 81'	Report	Benítez 23' (pen.); Luna 84', 90+3' (pen.)

Estadio Rommel Fernández, Panama City
Attendance: 316
Referee: Marco Rodríguez (Mexico)

October 18, 2011
20:00

FC Dallas (United States)	0–3	(Canada) Toronto FC
	Report	Koevermans 29'; Plata 69', 81'

Pizza Hut Park, Frisco
Attendance: 2,578
Referee: Roberto García (Mexico)
October 19, 2011
22:00

UNAM (Mexico)	1–0	(Panama) Tauro
Cacho 45'	Report

Estadio Olímpico Universitario, Mexico City
Attendance: 5,522
Referee: Joel Aguilar (El Salvador)

Notes

- Note 1: Match originally played on August 24, 2011 (kickoff 20:00), but abandoned at halftime due to lightning, heavy rain, and a tornado warning (FC Dallas was leading 1–0 on a goal by Jackson Gonçalves in the 18th minute). Replayed the next day restarting at 0–0 as tournament regulations required unfinished games be replayed completely.

=== Group D ===
Team	Pld	W	D	L	GF	GA	GD	Pts	Qualification	MON	SEA	COM	HER
(Mexico) Monterrey	6	4	0	2	11	4	+7	12	Advance to championship round		0–1	3–1	1–0
(United States) Seattle Sounders FC	6	3	1	2	10	7	+3	10	Advance to championship round	1–2		4–1	0–1
(Guatemala) Comunicaciones	6	2	1	3	8	13	−5	7		1–0	2–2		2–0
(Costa Rica) Herediano	6	2	0	4	6	11	−5	6		0–5	1–2	4–1	

August 16, 2011
22:00

Seattle Sounders FC (United States)	4–1	(Guatemala) Comunicaciones
Evans 35'; Fucito 61', 67'; Gómez 87' (o.g.)	Report	Arreola 2'

CenturyLink Field, Seattle
Attendance: 10,017
Referee: Paul Delgadillo (Mexico)
August 17, 2011
20:00

Herediano (Costa Rica)	0–5	(Mexico) Monterrey
	Report	Carreño 21', 22', 35'; Corona 36'; De Nigris 56'

Estadio Nacional de Costa Rica, San José
Attendance: 8,959
Referee: Marlon Mejía (El Salvador)

August 23, 2011
20:00

Monterrey (Mexico)	0–1	(United States) Seattle Sounders FC
	Report	Fernández 38'

Estadio Tecnológico, Monterrey
Attendance: 10,234
Referee: Elmar Rodas (Guatemala)
August 24, 2011^{2}
17:00

Comunicaciones (Guatemala)	2–0	(Costa Rica) Herediano
Ceballos 73'; Ordóñez 90+4'	Report

Estadio Cementos Progreso, Guatemala City
Attendance: 726
Referee: Mark Geiger (United States)

September 14, 2011
22:00

Herediano (Costa Rica)	1–2	(United States) Seattle Sounders FC
Cancela 45+1' (pen.)	Report	Montero 3', 54'

Estadio Alejandro Morera Soto, Alajuela
Attendance: 514
Referee: Jafeth Perea (Panama)
September 14, 2011
22:00

Comunicaciones (Guatemala)	1–0	(Mexico) Monterrey
Ramírez 45'	Report

Estadio Cementos Progreso, Guatemala City
Attendance: 3,552
Referee: Joel Aguilar (El Salvador)

September 20, 2011
20:00

Monterrey (Mexico)	3–1	(Guatemala) Comunicaciones
Santana 32'; Pérez 68'; Suazo 86'	Report	Mejía 83'

Estadio Tecnológico, Monterrey
Attendance: 10,578
Referee: Jair Marrufo (United States)
September 20, 2011
22:00

Seattle Sounders FC (United States)	0–1	(Costa Rica) Herediano
	Report	Arias 25'

CenturyLink Field, Seattle
Attendance: 10,163
Referee: Neal Brizan (Trinidad and Tobago)

September 27, 2011
22:00

Comunicaciones (Guatemala)	2–2	(United States) Seattle Sounders FC
Montepeque 7'; R. Morales 64'	Report	Alonso 44', 89'

Estadio Cementos Progreso, Guatemala City
Attendance: 4,500
Referee: Roberto García (Mexico)
September 27, 2011
22:00

Monterrey (Mexico)	1–0	(Costa Rica) Herediano
De Nigris 30'	Report

Estadio Tecnológico, Monterrey
Attendance: 12,445
Referee: Elmer Bonilla (El Salvador)

October 18, 2011
22:00

Seattle Sounders FC (United States)	1–2	(Mexico) Monterrey
Montero 42'	Report	Carreño 3'; Delgado 60'

CenturyLink Field, Seattle
Attendance: 15,866
Referee: Enrico Wijngaarde (Suriname)
October 19, 2011
22:00

Herediano (Costa Rica)	4–1	(Guatemala) Comunicaciones
Barbosa 13', 41'; Montero 49'; Cordero 61'	Report	Mejía 8'

Estadio Alejandro Morera Soto, Alajuela
Attendance: 200
Referee: Mauricio Navarro (Canada)

Notes

- Note 2: Match originally to be played on August 23, 2011 (kickoff 22:00), but postponed to the next day due to heavy rain.
