= 2011–12 CONCACAF Champions League =

47th edition of premier club football tournament organized by CONCACAF

Tournament details
- Dates: July 26, 2011 – April 25, 2012
- Teams: 24 (from 12 associations)

Final positions
- Champions: (Mexico) Monterrey (2nd title)
- Runners-up: (Mexico) Santos Laguna

Tournament statistics
- Matches played: 78
- Goals scored: 242 (3.1 per match)
- Attendance: 674,305 (8,645 per match)
- Top scorer(s): (Mexico) Oribe Peralta (Chile) Humberto Suazo (7 goals each)
- Best player: (Mexico) Oribe Peralta

The 2011–12 CONCACAF Champions League was the 4th edition of the CONCACAF Champions League under its current format, and overall the 47th edition of the premier football club competition organized by CONCACAF, the regional governing body of North America, Central America and the Caribbean. The tournament began on July 26, 2011 and finished with the second leg of the final April 25, 2012.

Defending champions Monterrey won the title, and qualified as the CONCACAF representative at the 2012 FIFA Club World Cup.

== Qualification ==
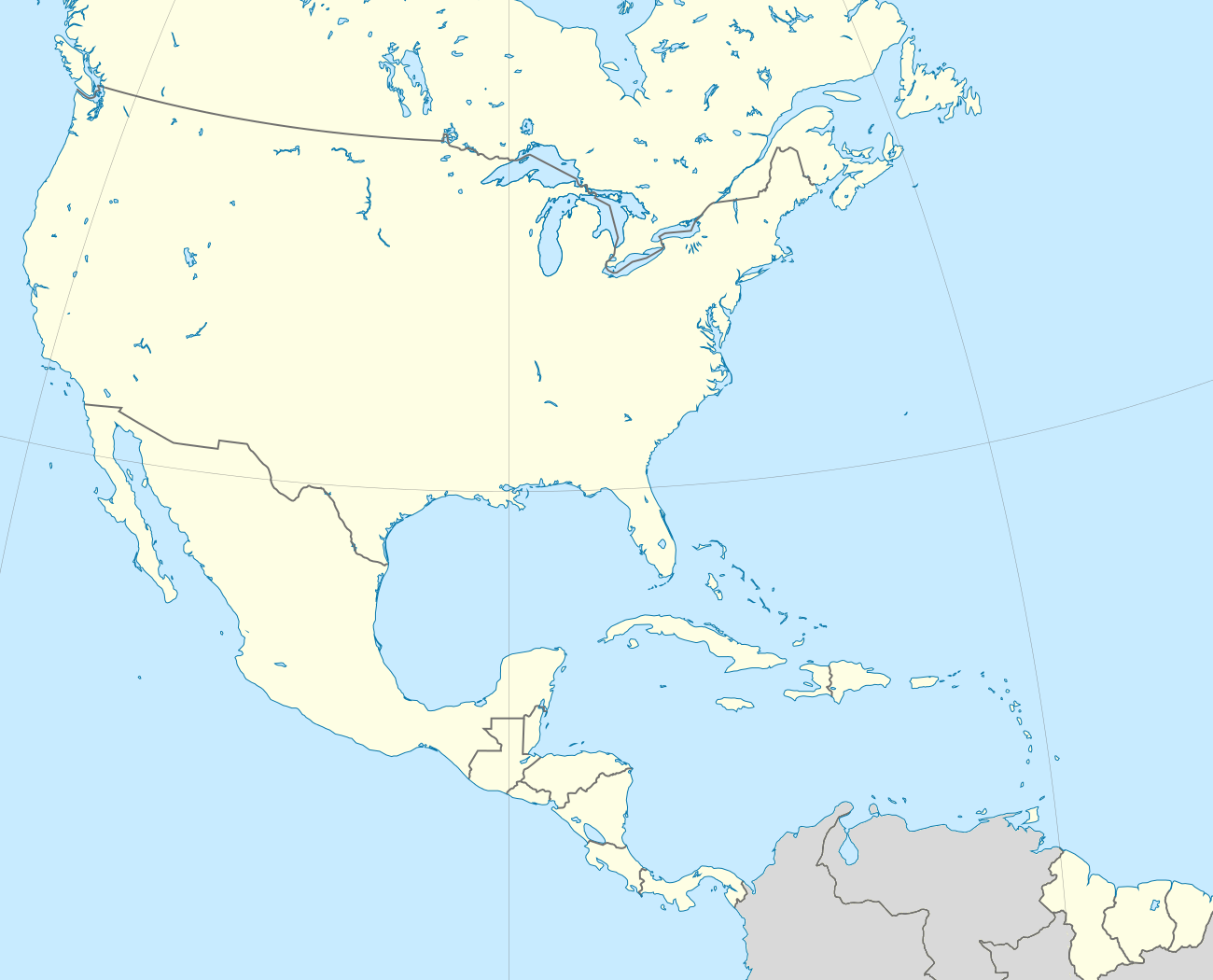
Location of teams of the 2011–12 CONCACAF Champions League
Brown: Group A; Red: Group B; Orange: Group C; Yellow: Group D.

Twenty-four teams participated in the 2011–12 CONCACAF Champions League from the North American, Central American, and Caribbean zones. Nine of the teams came from North America, twelve from Central America, and three from the Caribbean.

Teams could be disqualified and replaced by a team from a different country if the club didn't have an available stadium that met CONCACAF regulations for safety. If a club's own stadium failed to meet the set standards then it could find a suitable replacement stadium within its own country. However, if it was still determined that the club could not provide the adequate facilities then it ran the risk of being replaced.

=== North America ===
A total of nine clubs from the North American Football Union participated in the Champions League. Mexico and the United States were allocated four spots, the most of any CONCACAF nation, while Canada was granted one spot in the tournament.

In Mexico, the winners of the Mexican Primera División Apertura and Clausura tournaments earned direct berths into the group stage of the Champions League, while the tournament runners-up earned berths into the preliminary round.

For the United States, three of its four spots were allocated through the Major League Soccer regular season and playoffs, while the fourth spot was allocated to the winner of the domestic cup competition, the U.S. Open Cup. The U.S. Open Cup winner, along with the MLS Cup runner-up, earned berths into the preliminary round of the tournament. The winner of the Supporters' Shield and MLS Cup were given byes into the group stage.

The winners of Canada's domestic cup competition, the Canadian Championship, earned the lone Canadian berth into the tournament, entering in the preliminary round.

=== Central America ===
Twelve clubs from the Central American Football Union qualified to the Champions League. If one or more clubs was precluded, it was supplanted by a club from another Central American federation. The reallocation would be based on results from previous Champions League tournaments.

For the Central American representatives that qualified via split seasons, in nations that played a playoff to determine a national champion, the winners gained the nation's top spot. In nations that didn't utilize such methods, total points over both seasons, followed by other tiebreakers, determined which team gained the nation's top spot. The top teams from the leagues of Costa Rica, Honduras, Guatemala and Panama entered the group stage, while their second teams entered the preliminary round. The two teams from the league of El Salvador and the sole representatives from the leagues of Nicaragua and Belize entered the preliminary round.

=== Caribbean ===
Three berths in the Champions League's Preliminary Round were allocated to the top three finishers of the CFU Club Championship, a subcontinental tournament for clubs from nations of the Caribbean Football Union. In order for a Caribbean club to qualify for the CFU Club Championship, they needed to finish as the champions (or in some cases, runners-up) in their respective nation's top league in the previous season.

If any Caribbean club was precluded, it was supplanted by the fourth-place finisher from the CFU Club Championship.

=== Teams ===
Teams in bold qualified directly for the group stage.

| Association | Club | Qualifying method | App | Last App |
North America (9 teams)
| (Mexico) Mexico; 4 berths | **Monterrey** | 2010 Apertura champion | 2nd | 2010–11 |
| (Mexico) Mexico; 4 berths | **Pumas UNAM** | 2011 Clausura champion | 3rd | 2009–10 |
| (Mexico) Mexico; 4 berths | Santos Laguna | 2010 Apertura runner-up | 3rd | 2010–11 |
| (Mexico) Mexico; 4 berths | Morelia | 2011 Clausura runner-up | 1st | None |
| (United States) United States; 4 berths | **Colorado Rapids** | MLS Cup 2010 champions | 1st | None |
| (United States) United States; 4 berths | **Los Angeles Galaxy** | 2010 MLS Supporters' Shield champion | 2nd | 2010–11 |
| (United States) United States; 4 berths | FC Dallas | MLS Cup 2010 runners-up | 1st | None |
| (United States) United States; 4 berths | Seattle Sounders FC | 2010 U.S. Open Cup champions | 2nd | 2010–11 |
| (Canada) Canada; 1 berth | Toronto FC | 2011 Canadian Championship champions | 3rd | 2010–11 |
Central America (12 teams)
| (Honduras) Honduras; 3 berths | **Real España** | 2010 Apertura champions | 2nd | 2009–10 |
| (Honduras) Honduras; 3 berths | Motagua | 2011 Clausura champions | 2nd | 2010–11 |
| (Honduras) Honduras; 3 berths | Olimpia | 2010 Apertura runner-up and 2011 Clausura runners-up^{1} | 4th | 2010–11 |
| (Costa Rica) Costa Rica; 2 berths | **Alajuelense** | 2010 Invierno champions and 2011 Verano champions | 2nd | 2008–09 |
| (Costa Rica) Costa Rica; 2 berths | Herediano | 2010 Invierno runners-up (runners-up with better aggregate record) | 2nd | 2009–10 |
| (Guatemala) Guatemala; 2 berths | **Comunicaciones** | 2010 Apertura champions and 2011 Clausura champions | 2nd | 2009–10 |
| (Guatemala) Guatemala; 2 berths | Municipal | 2010 Apertura runners-up and 2011 Clausura runners-up | 3rd | 2010–11 |
| (Panama) Panama; 2 berths | **Tauro** | 2010 Apertura champions | 3rd | 2010–11 |
| (Panama) Panama; 2 berths | San Francisco | 2011 Clausura champions | 4th | 2010–11 |
| (El Salvador) El Salvador; 2 berths | Isidro Metapán | 2010 Apertura champions | 4th | 2010–11 |
| (El Salvador) El Salvador; 2 berths | Alianza | 2011 Clausura champions | 1st | None |
| (Nicaragua) Nicaragua; 1 berth | Real Estelí | Champions with better aggregate record in 2010–11 season | 2nd | 2008–09 |
Caribbean (3 teams)
| Puerto Rico | Puerto Rico Islanders | 2011 CFU Club Championship champions | 4th | 2010–11 |
| Haiti | Tempête | 2011 CFU Club Championship runners-up | 1st | None |
| Guyana | Alpha United | 2011 CFU Club Championship third place | 1st | None |

- Number of appearances and last appearance count only those in the Champions League era starting from 2008–09 (not counting those in the era of the Champions' Cup from 1962 to 2008).

^{1} Berth originally awarded to Belize (Belize Defence Force) but Belize failed CONCACAF stadium requirements, so the spot vacated was awarded to Honduras (Olimpia) based on performance from last season.

== Format ==
Like the previous editions, the tournament was divided into three phases:

- In the preliminary round, 16 teams were drawn into eight two-legged home-and-away ties, with each tie containing one team from Pot A and one team from Pot B. The eight winners qualified for the group stage to join the eight teams which directly entered the group stage.
- In the group stage, 16 teams were drawn into four groups of four playing in a round-robin home-and-away format, with each group containing two direct entries (one team from Pot A and one team from Pot B) and two preliminary round winners. The top two teams from each group advanced to the quarter-finals of the championship round.
- In the championship round, the eight teams played in a knockout tournament, with each tie played in two-legged home-and-away format.

Teams from the same association (excluding "wildcard" teams which replaced a team from another association) could not be drawn with each other in the preliminary round and group stage, but could be drawn with each other in the championship round, where the only restriction was that in the quarter-finals, a group winner had to be drawn with the runner-up of another group and also host the second leg.

For the two-legged ties of the preliminary round and championship round, the away goals rule was used, but not after a tie entered extra time, and so the tie was decided by a penalty shoot-out if the aggregate score was level after extra time.

Group stage
| Pot A | (Mexico) Monterrey | (Mexico) Pumas UNAM | (United States) Colorado Rapids | (United States) Los Angeles Galaxy |
| Pot B | (Costa Rica) Alajuelense | (Honduras) Real España | (Guatemala) Comunicaciones | (Panama) Tauro |
Preliminary round
| Pot A | (Mexico) Santos Laguna | (Mexico) Morelia | (United States) FC Dallas | (United States) Seattle Sounders FC |
| Pot A | (Costa Rica) Herediano | (Honduras) Motagua | (El Salvador) Isidro Metapán | (Canada) Toronto FC |
| Pot B | (Guatemala) Municipal | (Panama) San Francisco | (El Salvador) Alianza | (Nicaragua) Real Estelí |
| Pot B | (Honduras) Olimpia | Puerto Rico Islanders | (Haiti) Tempête | (Guyana) Alpha United |

== Schedule ==
| Round | | Draw date | First leg | Second leg |
|---|---|---|---|---|
| Preliminary round | | May 18, 2011 (New York City, United States) | July 26–28, 2011 | August 2–4, 2011 |
| Group stage | Matchday 1 | May 18, 2011 (New York City, United States) | August 16–18, 2011 | |
| Group stage | Matchday 2 | May 18, 2011 (New York City, United States) | August 23–25, 2011 | |
| Group stage | Matchday 3 | May 18, 2011 (New York City, United States) | September 13–15, 2011 | |
| Group stage | Matchday 4 | May 18, 2011 (New York City, United States) | September 20–22, 2011 | |
| Group stage | Matchday 5 | May 18, 2011 (New York City, United States) | September 27–29, 2011 | |
| Group stage | Matchday 6 | May 18, 2011 (New York City, United States) | October 18–20, 2011 | |
| Championship round | Quarter-finals | November 8, 2011 (New York City, United States) | March 6–8, 2012 | March 13–15, 2012 |
| Championship round | Semi-finals | November 8, 2011 (New York City, United States) | March 28, 2012 | April 4, 2012 |
| Championship round | Final | November 8, 2011 (New York City, United States) | April 18, 2012 | April 25, 2012 |

== Preliminary round ==
The draw for the preliminary round and the group stage was held on May 18, 2011. The first legs of the preliminary round were played July 26–28, 2011, while the second legs were played August 2–4, 2011.

| Team 1 | Agg. | Team 2 | 1st leg | 2nd leg |
|---|---|---|---|---|
| Motagua (Honduras) | 4–2 | (Guatemala) Municipal | 4–0 | 0–2 |
| Morelia (Mexico) | 7–0 | (Haiti) Tempête | 5–0 | 2–0 |
| Isidro Metapán (El Salvador) | 3–3 (a) | Puerto Rico Islanders | 2–0 | 1–3 |
| Santos Laguna (Mexico) | 4–3 | (Honduras) Olimpia | 3–1 | 1–2 |
| Alianza (El Salvador) | 0–2 | (United States) FC Dallas | 0–1 | 0–1 |
| Toronto FC (Canada) | 4–2 | (Nicaragua) Real Estelí | 2–1 | 2–1 |
| San Francisco (Panama) | 1–2 | (United States) Seattle Sounders FC | 1–0 | 0–2 (a.e.t.) |
| Herediano (Costa Rica) | 10–2 | (Guyana) Alpha United | 8–0 | 2–2 |

== Group stage ==
The Group Stage were played in 6 matchdays during August–October 2011: August 16–18, August 23–25, September 13–15, September 20–22, September 27–29, and October 18–20. The top two teams of each group advanced to the championship round.

=== Group A ===
| Team | Pld | W | D | L | GF | GA | GD | Pts | Qualification | LA | MOR | ALA | MOT |
|---|---|---|---|---|---|---|---|---|---|---|---|---|---|
| (United States) Los Angeles Galaxy | 6 | 4 | 0 | 2 | 8 | 4 | +4 | 12 (Note: Tiebreakers: Los Angeles Galaxy, Morelia and Alajuelense are ranked by their head-to-head records.) | Advance to championship round | | 2–1 | 2–0 | 2–0 |
| (Mexico) Morelia | 6 | 4 | 0 | 2 | 11 | 5 | +6 | 12 | Advance to championship round | 2–1 | | 2–1 | 4–0 |
| (Costa Rica) Alajuelense | 6 | 4 | 0 | 2 | 8 | 6 | +2 | 12 | | 1–0 | 1–0 | | 1–0 |
| (Honduras) Motagua | 6 | 0 | 0 | 6 | 2 | 14 | −12 | 0 | | 0–1 | 0–2 | 2–4 | |

Legend: Blue = home team win; Yellow = draw; Red = away team win.

=== Group B ===
| Team | Pld | W | D | L | GF | GA | GD | Pts | Qualification | SAN | MET | COL | REA |
|---|---|---|---|---|---|---|---|---|---|---|---|---|---|
| (Mexico) Santos Laguna | 6 | 4 | 1 | 1 | 16 | 6 | +10 | 13 | Advance to championship round | | 6–0 | 2–0 | 3–2 |
| (El Salvador) Isidro Metapán | 6 | 3 | 0 | 3 | 10 | 15 | −5 | 9 | Advance to championship round | 2–0 | | 1–3 | 3–2 |
| (United States) Colorado Rapids | 6 | 2 | 1 | 3 | 9 | 12 | −3 | 7 | | 1–4 | 3–2 | | 1–2 |
| (Honduras) Real España | 6 | 1 | 2 | 3 | 9 | 11 | −2 | 5 | | 1–1 | 1–2 | 1–1 | |

Legend: Blue = home team win; Yellow = draw; Red = away team win.

=== Group C ===
| Team | Pld | W | D | L | GF | GA | GD | Pts | Qualification | UNAM | TOR | DAL | TAU |
|---|---|---|---|---|---|---|---|---|---|---|---|---|---|
| (Mexico) UNAM | 6 | 3 | 2 | 1 | 8 | 2 | +6 | 11 | Advance to championship round | | 4–0 | 0–1 | 1–0 |
| (Canada) Toronto FC | 6 | 3 | 1 | 2 | 7 | 7 | 0 | 10 | Advance to championship round | 1–1 | | 0–1 | 1–0 |
| (United States) FC Dallas | 6 | 2 | 1 | 3 | 6 | 11 | −5 | 7 | | 0–2 | 0–3 | | 1–1 |
| (Panama) Tauro | 6 | 1 | 2 | 3 | 7 | 8 | −1 | 5 | | 0–0 | 1–2 | 5–3 | |

Legend: Blue = home team win; Yellow = draw; Red = away team win.

=== Group D ===
| Team | Pld | W | D | L | GF | GA | GD | Pts | Qualification | MON | SEA | COM | HER |
|---|---|---|---|---|---|---|---|---|---|---|---|---|---|
| (Mexico) Monterrey | 6 | 4 | 0 | 2 | 11 | 4 | +7 | 12 | Advance to championship round | | 0–1 | 3–1 | 1–0 |
| (United States) Seattle Sounders FC | 6 | 3 | 1 | 2 | 10 | 7 | +3 | 10 | Advance to championship round | 1–2 | | 4–1 | 0–1 |
| (Guatemala) Comunicaciones | 6 | 2 | 1 | 3 | 8 | 13 | −5 | 7 | | 1–0 | 2–2 | | 2–0 |
| (Costa Rica) Herediano | 6 | 2 | 0 | 4 | 6 | 11 | −5 | 6 | | 0–5 | 1–2 | 4–1 | |

Legend: Blue = home team win; Yellow = draw; Red = away team win.

== Championship round ==
=== Bracket ===
The draw for the championship round was held on November 8, 2011. In the quarterfinals, the group winners were assured of playing the second leg at home, and were drawn against the group runners-up, with the only restriction being that they could not face the same team that they played in the group stage (and thus they could face a team from the same association).

Quarter-finals
(Mexico) Morelia | 1 | 1 | 2
(Mexico) Monterrey | 3 | 4 | 7
(El Salvador) Isidro Metapán | 2 | 0 | 2
(Mexico) Pumas UNAM | 1 | 8 | 9
(Canada) Toronto FC | 2 | 2 | 4
(United States) Los Angeles Galaxy | 2 | 1 | 3
(United States) Seattle Sounders FC | 2 | 1 | 3
(Mexico) Santos Laguna | 1 | 6 | 7

Semi-finals
(Mexico) Monterrey | 3 | 1 | 4
(Mexico) Pumas UNAM | 0 | 1 | 1
(Canada) Toronto FC | 1 | 2 | 3
(Mexico) Santos Laguna | 1 | 6 | 7

Final
(Mexico) Monterrey | 2 | 1 | 3
(Mexico) Santos Laguna | 0 | 2 | 2

=== Quarter-finals ===
The first legs of the quarter-finals were played March 6–8, 2012, and the second legs were played March 13–15, 2012.

| Team 1 | Agg. | Team 2 | 1st leg | 2nd leg |
|---|---|---|---|---|
| Seattle Sounders FC (United States) | 3–7 | (Mexico) Santos Laguna | 2–1 | 1–6 |
| Isidro Metapán (El Salvador) | 2–9 | (Mexico) Pumas UNAM | 2–1 | 0–8 |
| Toronto FC (Canada) | 4–3 | (United States) Los Angeles Galaxy | 2–2 | 2–1 |
| Morelia (Mexico) | 2–7 | (Mexico) Monterrey | 1–3 | 1–4 |

=== Semi-finals ===
The first legs of the semi-finals were played March 28, 2012, and the second legs were played April 4, 2012.

| Team 1 | Agg. | Team 2 | 1st leg | 2nd leg |
|---|---|---|---|---|
| Toronto FC (Canada) | 3–7 | (Mexico) Santos Laguna | 1–1 | 2–6 |
| Monterrey (Mexico) | 4–1 | (Mexico) Pumas UNAM | 3–0 | 1–1 |

=== Final ===
The first leg of the final was played April 18, 2012, and the second leg was played April 25, 2012.

| Team 1 | Agg. | Team 2 | 1st leg | 2nd leg |
|---|---|---|---|---|
| Monterrey (Mexico) | 3–2 | (Mexico) Santos Laguna | 2–0 | 1–2 |

CONCACAF Champions League
2011–12 champion

Monterrey
Second title

== Top goalscorers ==
| Rank | Player | Club | Goals |
|---|---|---|---|
| 1 | (Chile) Humberto Suazo | (Mexico) Monterrey | 7 |
| 1 | (Mexico) Oribe Peralta | (Mexico) Santos Laguna | 7 |
| 3 | (Brazil) Jorge Barbosa | (Costa Rica) Herediano | 6 |
| 3 | (United States) Herculez Gomez | (Mexico) Santos Laguna | 6 |
| 3 | (Ecuador) Joao Plata | (Canada) Toronto FC | 6 |
| 6 | (Mexico) Darío Carreño | (Mexico) Monterrey | 5 |
| 6 | (Jamaica) Ryan Johnson | (Canada) Toronto FC | 5 |
| 6 | (Ecuador) Cristian Suárez | (Mexico) Santos Laguna | 5 |
| 9 | (Argentina) Martín Bravo | (Mexico) Pumas UNAM | 4 |
| 9 | (Mexico) Aldo de Nigris | (Mexico) Monterrey | 4 |
| 9 | (Mexico) Eduardo Herrera | (Mexico) Pumas UNAM | 4 |
| 9 | (Colombia) Darwin Quintero | (Mexico) Santos Laguna | 4 |
| 9 | (Uruguay) Paolo Suárez | (El Salvador) Isidro Metapán | 4 |

== Awards ==
For the first time, CONCACAF awarded a Golden Boot trophy to the top scorer and a Golden Ball trophy to the player of the tournament. Humberto Suazo won the Golden Boot over Oribe Peralta by the tie-breaker of scoring more goals over the two-leg final. Oribe Peralta won the Golden Ball, determined by a combination of fan and media votes.
