= Jorge Barbosa =

Jorge Barbosa may refer to:

- Jorge Barbosa (writer) (1901–1971), Cape Verdean writer and poet
- Jorge Barbosa (footballer) (born 1979), Brazilian football forward
