= 2011–12 CONCACAF Champions League preliminary round =

The 2011–12 CONCACAF Champions League preliminary round was played from July to August 2011. The first legs were played July 26–28, 2011, and the second legs were played August 2–4, 2011.

The draw for the preliminary round and the group stage was held on May 18, 2011, at the CONCACAF headquarters in New York City. Teams from the same association (excluding "wildcard" teams which replace a team from another association) may not be drawn with each other.

A total of 16 teams competed, divided into eight ties. Each tie was played over two legs, and the away goals rule would be used, but not after a tie enters extra time, and so a tie would be decided by penalty shootout if the aggregate score is level after extra time. The winners of each tie advanced to the group stage to join the eight automatic qualifiers.

== Matches ==
| Team 1 | Agg. | Team 2 | 1st leg | 2nd leg |
|---|---|---|---|---|
| Motagua (Honduras) | 4–2 | (Guatemala) Municipal | 4–0 | 0–2 |
| Morelia (Mexico) | 7–0 | (Haiti) Tempête | 5–0 | 2–0 |
| Isidro Metapán (El Salvador) | 3–3 (a) | Puerto Rico Islanders | 2–0 | 1–3 |
| Santos Laguna (Mexico) | 4–3 | (Honduras) Olimpia | 3–1 | 1–2 |
| Alianza (El Salvador) | 0–2 | (United States) FC Dallas | 0–1 | 0–1 |
| Toronto FC (Canada) | 4–2 | (Nicaragua) Real Estelí | 2–1 | 2–1 |
| San Francisco (Panama) | 1–2 | (United States) Seattle Sounders FC | 1–0 | 0–2 (a.e.t.) |
| Herediano (Costa Rica) | 10–2 | (Guyana) Alpha United | 8–0 | 2–2 |

All Times U.S. Eastern Daylight Time (UTC−04:00)

=== First leg ===
July 26, 2011
20:00

| San Francisco (Panama) | 1–0 | (United States) Seattle Sounders FC |
|---|---|---|
| Brown 28' (pen.) | Report |

Estadio Rommel Fernández, Panama City
Attendance: 700
Referee: David España (Guatemala)

July 26, 2011
22:00

| Herediano (Costa Rica) | 8–0 | (Guyana) Alpha United |
|---|---|---|
| Cubero 10'; Cancela 30'; Arias 38'; Salazar 59'; Barbosa 70', 77', 89'; Cordero 90+4' | Report |

Estadio Nacional de Costa Rica, San José
Attendance: 7,335
Referee: Óscar Dávila (Nicaragua)

July 27, 2011
20:00

| Toronto FC (Canada) | 2–1 | (Nicaragua) Real Estelí |
|---|---|---|
| Plata 56', 72' | Report | Calero 80' |

BMO Field, Toronto
Attendance: 9,241
Referee: Ricardo Salazar (United States)

July 27, 2011
20:00

| Isidro Metapán (El Salvador) | 2–0 | Puerto Rico Islanders |
|---|---|---|
| E. Sánchez 65'; Allan Kardeck 87' | Report |

Estadio Jorge Calero Suárez, Metapán
Attendance: 1,658
Referee: Jafeth Perea (Panama)

July 27, 2011
22:00

| Santos Laguna (Mexico) | 3–1 | (Honduras) Olimpia |
|---|---|---|
| Peralta 29'; Rodríguez 61' (pen.); Quintero 63' | Report | Bekeles 66' |

Estadio Corona, Torreón
Attendance: 7,500
Referee: Joel Aguilar (El Salvador)

July 28, 2011
20:00

| Morelia (Mexico) | 5–0 | (Haiti) Tempête |
|---|---|---|
| Huiqui 15'; Sabah 63' (pen.); Rojas 67'; Sepúlveda 70'; Lozano 76' | Report |

Estadio Morelos, Morelia
Attendance: 6,954
Referee: Héctor Rodríguez (Honduras)

July 28, 2011
22:00

| Alianza (El Salvador) | 0–1 | (United States) FC Dallas |
|---|---|---|
| | Report | Jackson 70' |

Estadio Cuscatlán, San Salvador
Attendance: 7,301
Referee: David Gantar (Canada)

July 28, 2011
22:00

| Motagua (Honduras) | 4–0 | (Guatemala) Municipal |
|---|---|---|
| Bengtson 42'; Borjas 56'; Guevara 69'; G. Ramírez 76' | Report |

Estadio Tiburcio Carías Andino, Tegucigalpa
Attendance: 6,000
Referee: Roberto Moreno (Panama)

=== Second leg ===
August 2, 2011
22:00

| Real Estelí (Nicaragua) | 1–2 | (Canada) Toronto FC |
|---|---|---|
| Rosas 45+1' (pen.) | Report | Johnson 37', 47' |

Estadio Independencia, Estelí
Attendance: 4,500
Referee: Raúl Castro (Honduras)

Toronto FC won 4–2 on aggregate.

August 3, 2011
20:00

| FC Dallas (United States) | 1–0 | (El Salvador) Alianza |
|---|---|---|
| Ihemelu 37' | Report |

Pizza Hut Park, Frisco
Attendance: 3,400
Referee: Enrico Wijngaarde (Suriname)

FC Dallas won 2–0 on aggregate.

August 3, 2011
20:00

| Tempête (Haiti) | 0–2 | (Mexico) Morelia |
|---|---|---|
| | Report | Sepúlveda 31'; Sansores 78' |

Estadio Morelos, Morelia (Mexico)^{1}
Attendance: 6,919
Referee: Javier Santos (Puerto Rico)

Morelia won 7–0 on aggregate.

August 3, 2011
20:00

| Puerto Rico Islanders | 3–1 | (El Salvador) Isidro Metapán |
|---|---|---|
| Foley 60' (pen.), 68' (pen.); Richardson 90+5' | Report | Blanco 56' |

Juan Ramón Loubriel Stadium, Bayamón
Attendance: 1,125
Referee: Valdin Legister (Jamaica)

3–3 on aggregate. Isidro Metapán won on away goals.

August 3, 2011
22:00

| Seattle Sounders FC (United States) | 2–0 (a.e.t.) | (Panama) San Francisco |
|---|---|---|
| Fernández 41'; Jaqua 98' | Report |

CenturyLink Field, Seattle
Attendance: 21,233
Referee: Jeffrey Solís (Costa Rica)

Seattle Sounders FC won 2–1 on aggregate.

August 3, 2011
22:00

| Olimpia (Honduras) | 2–1 | (Mexico) Santos Laguna |
|---|---|---|
| Rojas 16'; Beckeles 86' | Report | Suárez 14' |

Estadio Tiburcio Carías Andino, Tegucigalpa
Attendance: 10,644
Referee: Jair Marrufo (United States)

Santos Laguna won 4–3 on aggregate.

August 4, 2011
20:00

| Alpha United (Guyana) | 2–2 | (Costa Rica) Herediano |
|---|---|---|
| Abrams 34'; Grant 75' | Report | Hernández 78'; Barbosa 84' |

Providence Stadium, Providence
Attendance: 600
Referee: Adrian Skeete (Barbados)

Herediano won 10–2 on aggregate.

August 4, 2011
22:00

| Municipal (Guatemala) | 2–0 | (Honduras) Motagua |
|---|---|---|
| Romero 32', 43' (pen.) | Report |

Estadio Mateo Flores, Guatemala City
Attendance: 1,500
Referee: Ricardo Arellano (Mexico)

Motagua won 4–2 on aggregate.

Notes

- Note 1: Tempête of Haiti played both of its preliminary-round matches in the CONCACAF Champions League against Morelia in Mexico due to incomplete renovations to Stade Sylvio Cator in Port-au-Prince.
