= 2011 Northern Ireland Youth Soccer Tournament =

Tournament details
- Host country: Northern Ireland
- Dates: 25–29 July
- Teams: 50

The 2011 Northern Ireland Milk Cup is the twenty-ninth edition of the international football tournament which takes place annually in the north coast of Northern Ireland, and attracts competitors from across the globe. There are three sections to the tournament, the Elite Section (U19), the Premier Section (U17) and the Junior Section (U15). The defending champions are the USA, Etoile Lusitana and Chelsea respectively.

The Elite section has six teams in 2011, with each team playing two group matches on the Monday and Wednesday. The top two teams in the table after the group stage compete in the final on Friday evening, with the remaining teams playing off for final standings earlier that day.

The Junior and Premier sections are to be contested by 24 and 20 teams respectively this year. Each team plays once on Monday, Tuesday and Wednesday as part of a single league, from which the top 4 teams qualify for the Milk Cup semi-finals. The remainder of the teams qualify for lower-level cups (namely the Milk Globe, Vase, Bowl and Plate) that run alongside the Milk Cup based on their final league position, with semi-finals on Thursday, and the finals and play-off matches on Friday. In 2011 for the second time the finals night will be held at the Ballymena Showgrounds, rather than the traditional venue of the Coleraine Showgrounds.

- Elite – Under 19s – national sides
- Premier – Under 17s – club sides and national sides
- Junior – Under 15s – club sides and national sides

Clubs and national teams from anywhere in the world may compete on invitation, and five continents will be represented - Europe, North America, South America, Africa and Asia. The tournament is also continuing its tradition of allowing the host nation's youth to play against top opposition through six select teams from each county of Northern Ireland

== Venues ==
Coleraine	Ballymena	Ballymoney	Broughshane	Castlerock
Anderson Park, (Coleraine)	Ballymena Showgrounds	Ballymoney Showgrounds	Broughshane	Castlerock
55.135993°N 6.668408°W	54.870288°N 6.266637°W	55.069324°N 6.501884°W	54.893352°N 6.210983°W	55.164029°N 6.789929°W
Coleraine	2011 Northern Ireland Youth Soccer Tournament is located in Northern Ireland			Ballymoney
Coleraine Showgrounds	2011 Northern Ireland Youth Soccer Tournament is located in Northern Ireland			Riada Stadium
55.1341166°N 6.661164°W	2011 Northern Ireland Youth Soccer Tournament is located in Northern Ireland			55.0654684°N 6.4980832°W
Limavady	2011 Northern Ireland Youth Soccer Tournament is located in Northern Ireland			Coleraine
Roe Mill	2011 Northern Ireland Youth Soccer Tournament is located in Northern Ireland			Rugby Avenue
55.0452723°N 6.9514446°W	2011 Northern Ireland Youth Soccer Tournament is located in Northern Ireland			55.1214725°N 6.6590948°W
Limavady	Mullaghacall	Portrush	Portstewart	Coleraine
Limavady Showgrounds	Mullaghacall	Parker Avenue	The Warren	University Coleraine
55.134°N 6.67°W	55.1770556°N 6.713689°W	55.186906°N 6.7150201°W	55.1499713°N 6.6684915°W	55.1970574°N 6.64941°W

== Elite Section ==
Team	Pld	W	D	L	GF	GA	GD	Pts
Northern Ireland	2	1	1	0	4	2	+2	4
Denmark	2	1	1	0	4	2	+2	4
United States	2	1	1	0	3	1	+2	4
Georgia	2	1	0	1	3	4	–1	3
Mexico	2	0	1	1	1	2	–1	1
Israel	2	0	0	2	0	2	–4	0

=== Group stage ===
25 July 2011
18:00

Israel	0–2	United States

Ballymena Showgrounds

25 July 2011
20:00

Northern Ireland	1–1	Denmark

Coleraine Showgrounds

25 July 2011
20:00

Mexico	1–2	Georgia

Riada Stadium, Ballymoney

27 July 2011
20:00

Denmark	3–1	Israel

Riada Stadium, Ballymoney

27 July 2011
20:00

United States	1–1	Mexico

Coleraine Showgrounds

27 July 2011
20:00

Northern Ireland	3–1	Georgia

Ballymena Showgrounds

==== 5th Place Playoff ====
29 July 2011
11:00

Mexico	0–0	Israel
Penalties
	4–3

Riada Stadium, Ballymoney

==== 3rd Place Playoff ====
29 July 2011
13:00

United States	2–1	Georgia

Riada Stadium, Ballymoney

==== Final ====
29 July 2011
18:00

Denmark	1–0	Northern Ireland

Ballymena Showgrounds

== Premier Section ==
Team	Pld	W	D	L	GF	GA	GD	Pts
(England) Manchester United	3	3	0	0	15	1	+14	9
(Qatar) Aspire Academy	3	3	0	0	13	0	+13	9
(Senegal) Etoile Lusitana	3	3	0	0	5	0	+5	9
(Brazil) Desportivo Brasil	3	2	1	0	10	0	+10	7
(United States) South Coast Strikers	3	2	1	0	6	1	+5	7
(England) Bolton Wanderers	3	2	0	1	9	1	+8	6
(Republic of Ireland) Cherry Orchard	3	2	0	1	12	7	+5	6
(England) Tottenham Hotspur	3	2	0	1	7	3	+4	6
(Northern Ireland) County Tyrone	3	2	0	1	10	8	+2	6
(Northern Ireland) County Antrim	3	2	0	1	5	6	–1	6
(Northern Ireland) County Down	3	1	0	2	4	3	+1	3
(England) Hartlepool	3	1	0	2	5	8	–3	3
(Spain) Athletico del Pinto	3	1	0	2	2	5	–3	3
(Republic of Ireland) Bohemians	3	1	0	2	5	9	–4	3
(Northern Ireland) County Londonderry	3	1	0	2	2	6	–4	3
(Northern Ireland) County Armagh	3	1	0	2	3	8	–5	3
(Northern Ireland) County Fermanagh	3	0	0	3	2	6	–4	0
(New Zealand) Otago	3	0	0	3	0	12	–12	0
(Venezuela) Zamora FC	3	0	0	3	0	14	–14	0
(Netherlands) RSKV Leonidas	3	0	0	3	0	17	–17	0

Teams ranked 1–4 qualify for Milk Cup Semi-Finals
Teams ranked 5–8 qualify for NIMC Globe Semi-Finals
Teams ranked 9–12 qualify for NIMC Vase Semi-Finals
Teams ranked 13–16 qualify for NIMC Bowl Semi-Finals
Teams ranked 17–20 qualify for NIMC Plate Semi-Finals

=== Group stage ===
==== Monday 25 July ====
25 July 2011
15:30

South Coast Strikers	0–0	Desportivo Brasil

Broughshane

25 July 2011
15:30

Cherry Orchard	9–0	RSKV Leonidas

Roe Mill, Limavady

25 July 2011
15:30

Co. Tyrone	3–1	Co. Fermanagh

Riada Stadium, Ballymoney

25 July 2011
17:00

Athletico del Pinto	1–2	Hartlepool United

Castlerock

25 July 2011
17:00

Aspire	6–0	Bohemians

University, Coleraine

25 July 2011
17:00

Co. Armagh	0–4	Co. Down

Parker Avenue, Portrush

25 July 2011
18:00

Bolton Wanderers	0–1	Etoile Lusitana

Riada Stadium, Ballymoney

25 July 2011
19:00

Tottenham Hotspur	4–0	Otago

Showgrounds, Limavady

25 July 2011
19:00

Co. Antrim	2–1	Co. Londonderry

Mullaghacall, Portstewart

25 July 2011
20:00

Zamora FC	0–4	Manchester United

Showgrounds, Ballymena

==== Tuesday 26 July ====
26 July 2011
15:30

Hartlepool United	2–3	Co. Antrim

Broughshane

26 July 2011
17:00

Otago	0–3	Cherry Orchard

Rugby Avenue Stadium, Coleraine

26 July 2011
17:00

Bohemians	3–0	Zamora FC

Castlerock

26 July 2011
17:00

RSKV Leonidas	0–7	Desportivo Brasil

University, Coleraine

26 July 2011
18:00

Etoile Lusitana	3–0	Athletico del Pinto

Showgrounds, Ballymena

26 July 2011
19:00

Co. Londonderry	0–4	South Coast Strikers

Showgrounds, Limavady

26 July 2011
19:00

Co. Down	0–2	Aspire

Mullaghacall, Portstewart

26 July 2011
20:00

Co. Fermanagh	1–2	Tottenham Hotspur

Riada Stadium, Ballymoney

26 July 2011
20:00

Co. Armagh	0–2	Bolton Wanderers

Showgrounds, Ballymena

26 July 2011
20:00

Manchester United	7–0	Co. Tyrone

Showgrounds, Coleraine

==== Wednesday 27 July ====
27 July 2011
15:30

Co.Down	0–1	Etoile Lusitana

Broughshane

27 July 2011
15:30

Bohemians	2–3	Co. Armagh

Riada Stadium, Ballymoney

27 July 2011
15:30

Aspire	5–0	Otago

The Warren, Portstewart

27 July 2011
17:00

Co. Londonderry	1–0	RSKV Leonidas

Rugby Avenue Stadium, Coleraine

27 July 2011
17:00

Bolton Wanderers	7–0	Cherry Orchard

Castlerock

27 July 2011
17:00

Zamora FC	0–7	Co. Tyrone

Parker Avenue, Portrush

27 July 2011
18:00

Desportivo Brasil	3–0	Co. Antrim

Riada Stadium, Ballymoney

27 July 2011
18:00

South Coast Strikers	2–1	Tottenham Hotspur

Ballymena Showgrounds

27 July 2011
19:00

Manchester United	4–1	Hartlepool United

Showgrounds, Limavady

27 July 2011
19:00

Athletico del Pinto	1–0	Co. Fermanagh

Mullaghacall, Portstewart

==== Thursday 28 July ====
28 July 2011
20:00

Aspire Academy	6–1	Desportivo Brazil

Riada Stadium, Ballymoney

28 July 2011
20:00

Etoile Lusitana	0–1	Manchester United

Showgrounds, Coleraine
