= Bryan Ordóñez =

Guatemalan footballer

Personal information
- Full name: Bryan Alexander Ordóñez
- Date of birth: 5 November 1990 (age 35)
- Place of birth: Villa Nueva, Guatemala
- Height: 1.58 m (5 ft 2 in)
- Position: Midfielder

Team information
- Current team: Xinabajul
- Number: 19

Senior career*
Years	Team	Apps	(Gls)
2007–	Comunicaciones		

International career
2011–	Guatemala	1	(0)
- * Club domestic league appearances and goals

Bryan Alexander Ordóñez (born November 5, 1990) is a Guatemalan professional midfielder who currently plays for Liga Nacional club Xinabajul.
