= Luis Miguel Valle =

Costa Rican footballer (born 1989)

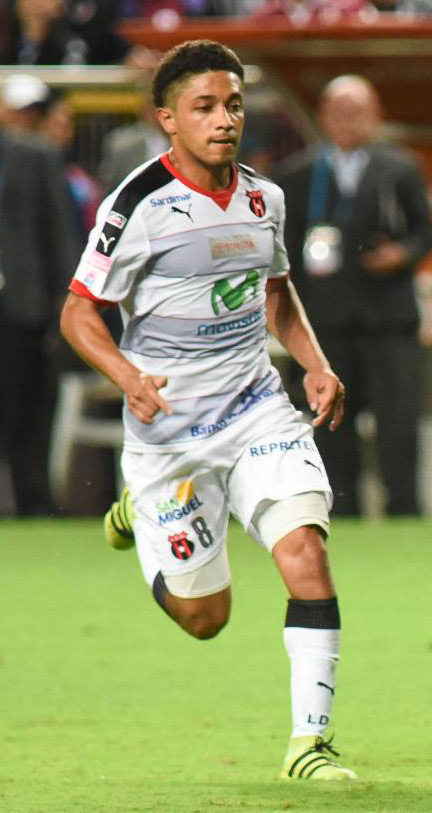

Personal information
- Full name: Luis Miguel Valle Juárez
- Date of birth: 11 April 1989 (age 37)
- Place of birth: San José, Costa Rica
- Height: 1.69 m (5 ft 7 in)
- Position: Defensive midfielder

Youth career
- Alajuelense

Senior career*
Years	Team	Apps	(Gls)
2009–2018	Alajuelense	289	(1)
2018	Pérez Zeledón	12	(1)
2018–2019	Sporting		
2019–2020	La U Universitarios	22	(1)
2020–2021	Santa Rosa		
2021–2022	Barrio México		

International career
2011–2016	Costa Rica	4	(0)
- * Club domestic league appearances and goals

Luis Miguel Valle Juárez (born 11 April 1989) is a Costa Rican former professional midfielder.

== Club career ==
Valle came through the youth ranks at Liga and has played for the senior team since making his debut against Pérez Zeledón on 22 March 2009.

== International career ==
Valle made his debut for Costa Rica in a July 2011 Copa América match against Argentina and has, as of December 2014, earned a total of 3 caps, scoring no goals.
