= 2011–12 CONCACAF Champions League championship round =

The 2011–12 CONCACAF Champions League championship round was played from March to April 2012. A total of eight teams qualified for the championship round: the four group winners and the four group runners-up from the group stage.

The draw for the championship round was held on November 8, 2011, at the CONCACAF headquarters in New York City. In the quarter-finals, the group winners were assured of playing the second leg at home, and were drawn against the group runners-up, with the only restriction being that they could not face the same team that they played in the group stage (and thus they could face a team from the same association).

The championship round was played in knockout format. Each tie was played over two legs, and the away goals rule was used, but not after a tie entered extra time; a penalty shoot-out was thus used if the aggregate score was level after extra time.

== Qualified teams ==
Group	Winners	Runners-up
A	(United States) Los Angeles Galaxy	(Mexico) Morelia
B	(Mexico) Santos Laguna	(El Salvador) Isidro Metapán
C	(Mexico) UNAM	(Canada) Toronto FC
D	(Mexico) Monterrey	(United States) Seattle Sounders FC

== Bracket ==
Quarter-finals
(Mexico) Morelia	1	1	2
(Mexico) Monterrey	3	4	7
(El Salvador) Isidro Metapán	2	0	2
(Mexico) UNAM	1	8	9
(Canada) Toronto FC	2	2	4
(United States) Los Angeles Galaxy	2	1	3
(United States) Seattle Sounders FC	2	1	3
(Mexico) Santos Laguna	1	6	7

Semi-finals
(Mexico) Monterrey	3	1	4
(Mexico) UNAM	0	1	1
(Canada) Toronto FC	1	2	3
(Mexico) Santos Laguna	1	6	7

Final
(Mexico) Monterrey	2	1	3
(Mexico) Santos Laguna	0	2	2

== Quarter-finals ==
The first legs of the quarter-finals were played March 6–8, 2012, and the second legs were played March 13–15, 2012.

Team 1	Agg.	Team 2	1st leg	2nd leg
Seattle Sounders FC (United States)	3–7	(Mexico) Santos Laguna	2–1	1–6
Isidro Metapán (El Salvador)	2–9	(Mexico) UNAM	2–1	0–8
Toronto FC (Canada)	4–3	(United States) Los Angeles Galaxy	2–2	2–1
Morelia (Mexico)	2–7	(Mexico) Monterrey	1–3	1–4

First leg: all times U.S. Eastern Standard Time (UTC−05:00); Second leg: all times U.S. Eastern Daylight Time (UTC−04:00)

=== First leg ===
March 6, 2012
22:00

Morelia (Mexico)	1–3	(Mexico) Monterrey
Huiqui 60'	Report	Suazo 28', 44'; Carreño 90+1'

Estadio Morelos, Morelia
Attendance: 14,951
Referee: Francisco Chacón (Mexico)

March 7, 2012
20:00

Toronto FC (Canada)	2–2	(United States) Los Angeles Galaxy
Johnson 12'; Silva 17'	Report	Magee 29'; Donovan 89'

Rogers Centre, Toronto^{1}
Attendance: 47,658
Referee: Courtney Campbell (Jamaica)

March 7, 2012
22:00

Seattle Sounders FC (United States)	2–1	(Mexico) Santos Laguna
Estrada 12'; Evans 63'	Report	Gomez 61'

CenturyLink Field, Seattle
Attendance: 23,433
Referee: Wálter Quesada (Costa Rica)

March 8, 2012
20:00

Isidro Metapán (El Salvador)	2–1	(Mexico) UNAM
Blanco 27', 49'	Report	Herrera 67'

Estadio Jorge Calero Suárez, Metapán
Attendance: 4,131
Referee: Walter López (Guatemala)

Notes

- Note 1: Match was played at Rogers Centre instead of BMO Field, the home stadium of Toronto FC, due to the unpredictability of March's weather conditions, and the stadium was not "winterized".

=== Second leg ===
March 13, 2012
22:00

Monterrey (Mexico)	4–1	(Mexico) Morelia
Suazo 44' (pen.), 71'; Pérez 61' (pen.); Ayoví 83'	Report	Sepúlveda 78' (pen.)

Estadio Tecnológico, Monterrey
Attendance: 33,000
Referee: Roberto García (Mexico)

Monterrey won 7–2 on aggregate.

March 14, 2012
20:00

Santos Laguna (Mexico)	6–1	(United States) Seattle Sounders FC
Suárez 8', 76'; Peralta 10'; Gomez 49', 68'; Ochoa 81'	Report	Fernández 37'

Estadio Corona, Torreón
Attendance: 14,278
Referee: Joel Aguilar (El Salvador)

Santos Laguna won 7–3 on aggregate.

March 14, 2012
22:00

Los Angeles Galaxy (United States)	1–2	(Canada) Toronto FC
Harden 55' (o.g.)	Report	Johnson 34'; Soolsma 67'

The Home Depot Center, Carson
Attendance: 7,500
Referee: Roberto Moreno (Panama)

Toronto FC won 4–3 on aggregate.

March 15, 2012
22:00

UNAM (Mexico)	8–0	(El Salvador) Isidro Metapán
A. Escobar 25' (o.g.); Herrera 26', 63'; Velarde 39'; Bravo 54'; García 69'; Espinoza 73'; Cacho 88'	Report

Estadio Olímpico Universitario, Mexico City
Attendance: 7,800
Referee: Mark Geiger (United States)

UNAM won 9–2 on aggregate.

== Semi-finals ==
The first legs of the semi-finals were played March 28, 2012, and the second legs were played April 4, 2012.

Team 1	Agg.	Team 2	1st leg	2nd leg
Toronto FC (Canada)	3–7	(Mexico) Santos Laguna	1–1	2–6
Monterrey (Mexico)	4–1	(Mexico) UNAM	3–0	1–1

All times U.S. Eastern Daylight Time (UTC−04:00)

=== First leg ===
March 28, 2012
20:00

Toronto FC (Canada)	1–1	(Mexico) Santos Laguna
Aceval 37'	Report	Gomez 30'

BMO Field, Toronto
Attendance: 18,950
Referee: Ricardo Salazar (United States)

March 28, 2012
22:00

Monterrey (Mexico)	3–0	(Mexico) UNAM
Morales 7'; De Nigris 60', 72'	Report

Estadio Tecnológico, Monterrey
Attendance: 26,716
Referee: José Alfredo Peñaloza (Mexico)

=== Second leg ===
April 4, 2012
20:00

Santos Laguna (Mexico)	6–2	(Canada) Toronto FC
Gomez 31', 45+2'; Rodríguez 56' (pen.), 64' (pen.); Peralta 66'; Ludueña 90+2'	Report	Plata 15', 43'

Estadio Corona, Torreón
Attendance: 26,843
Referee: Benigno Pineda (Honduras)

Santos Laguna won 7–3 on aggregate.

April 4, 2012
22:00

UNAM (Mexico)	1–1	(Mexico) Monterrey
García 71'	Report	Reyna 35'

Estadio Olímpico Universitario, Mexico City
Attendance: 7,300
Referee: Mauricio Morales (Mexico)

Monterrey won 4–1 on aggregate.

== Final ==
The first leg of the final was played April 18, 2012, and the second leg was played April 25, 2012.

Team 1	Agg.	Team 2	1st leg	2nd leg
Monterrey (Mexico)	3–2	(Mexico) Santos Laguna	2–0	1–2

All times U.S. Eastern Daylight Time (UTC−04:00)

=== First leg ===
April 18, 2012
22:00

Monterrey (Mexico)	2–0	(Mexico) Santos Laguna
Suazo 60', 86'	Report

Estadio Tecnológico, Monterrey
Attendance: 29,300
Referee: Francisco Chacón (Mexico)

=== Second leg ===
April 25, 2012
20:00

Santos Laguna (Mexico)	2–1	(Mexico) Monterrey
Ludueña 45+3'; Peralta 51'	Report	Cardozo 82'

Estadio Corona, Torreón
Attendance: 28,000
Referee: Roberto García (Mexico)

Monterrey won 3–2 on aggregate.
