= Luis Moreno (footballer) =

Panamanian footballer (born 1981)

Personal information
- Date of birth: 19 March 1981 (age 45)
- Place of birth: Panama City, Panama
- Height: 1.84 m (6 ft 1/2 in)
- Positions: Right back; centre back

Team information
- Current team: Tauro
- Number: 3

Senior career*
Years	Team	Apps	(Gls)
2000–2001	Deportivo Italia	0	(0)
2001–2004	Tauro		
2005–2006	Envigado	43	(2)
2006–2007	Tauro		
2007	Independiente SF	15	(0)
2007	Tiburones Rojos		
2008–2010	Tauro	51	(5)
2011	Deportivo Pereira	8	(0)
2011–2012	Tauro		

International career^{‡}
2001–2011	Panama	76	(0)
- * Club domestic league appearances and goals as of 29 March 2011 ‡ National team caps and goals as of 24 March 2011

Luis Moreno (born 19 March 1981) is a Panamanian football defender who last played for Tauro.

He gained notoriety after violently kicking an injured barn owl that had landed on the pitch during a league match between Junior de Barranquilla and Deportivo Pereira. The barn owl died due to the kick.

== Club career ==
Born in Panama City, "Lucho" Moreno began playing football with Venezuelan side Deportivo Italia. He was signed by first division club Tauro in 2001. He had a brief spell with Colombian side Envigado during 2005 and 2006, before returning to Tauro. Peruvian side Universitario de Deportes attempted to sign him in 2006, but he stayed with Tauro.

In January 2007, Moreno returned to the Colombian league, joining Independiente Santa Fe. The club terminated his contract in May 2007, after a disciplinary incident. He returned to Tauro, but shortly after joined Mexican Primera División A side Tiburones Rojos.

Moreno was loaned to Deportivo Pereira in January 2011, but returned to Tauro later that year, where he would help the club win its tenth league title in 2013.

== International career ==
Moreno made his debut for Panama in a June 2000 friendly match against Venezuela and has earned a total of 76 caps, scoring no goals. He represented his country in 17 FIFA World Cup qualification matches and has been a key member of the side, participating in the 2005, 2007 and 2009 CONCACAF Gold Cup finals.

His final international was a September 2011 friendly match against Paraguay.

== Honours ==
Panama

- CONCACAF Gold Cup runner-up: 2005

Individual

- CONCACAF Gold Cup All-Tournament Team: 2009

== Owl kicking incident ==
During a February 2011 league match between Junior de Barranquilla and Deportivo Pereira, Junior's unofficial mascot owl landed on the field during play and was struck by a pass. As the owl lay stunned on the field, Moreno, from the opposing team, kicked it approximately 3 meters (~10 feet) to the touchline. Shortly after, he claimed he was prompting it to fly away but in a later interview he admitted "The kick was a product of tension on the field at the time." The owl was treated for its injuries at a local veterinary clinic, but later died of stress related to the incident. Moreno received a two-match ban, a $560 fine from Colombian football's governing body in addition to veterinary costs for the owl's treatment and was ordered to do community service at a zoo.
