= Yosimar Arias =

Costa Rican footballer (born 1986)

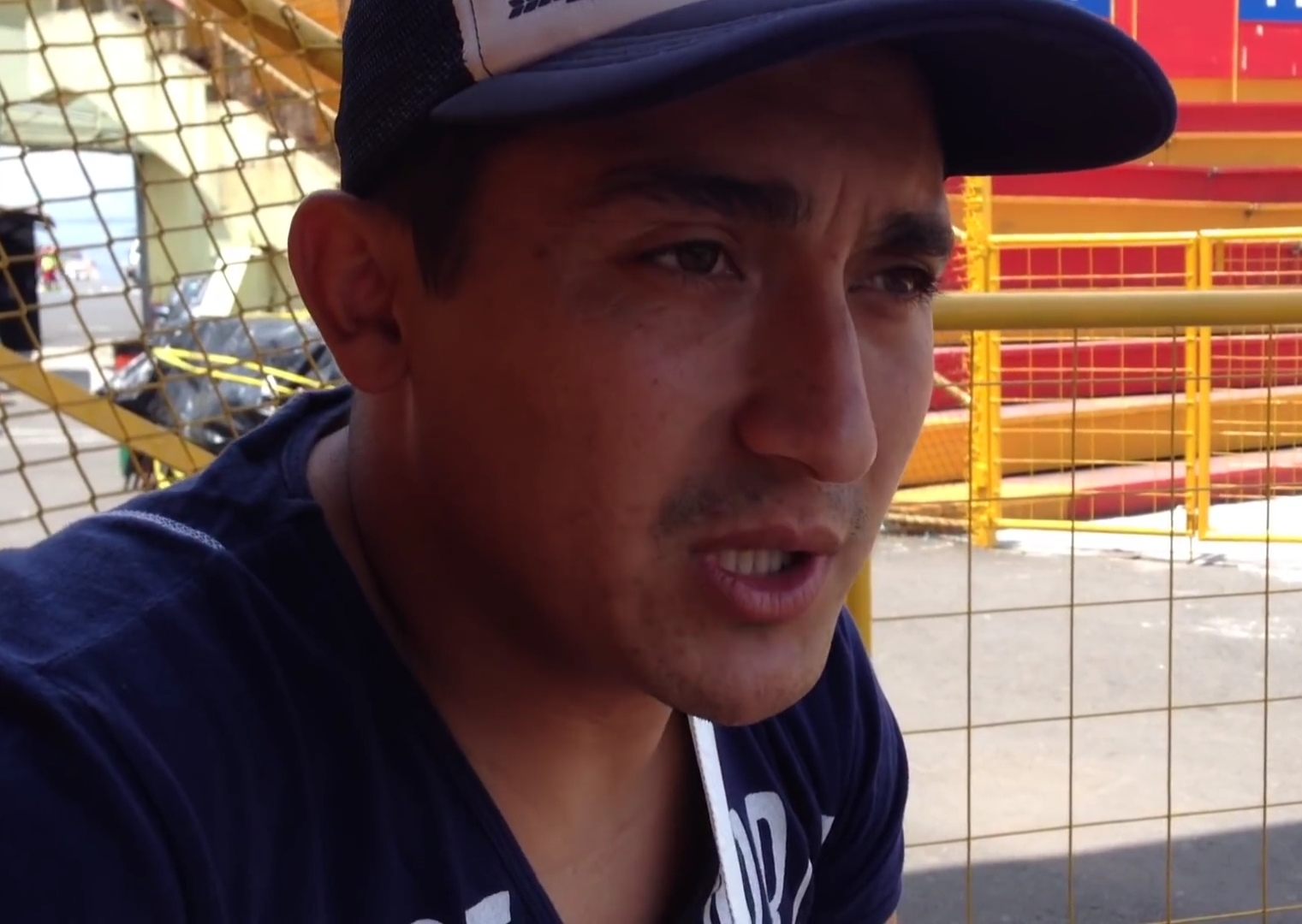
- Arias in 2015

Personal information
- Full name: Yosimar Arias Céspedes
- Date of birth: 24 September 1986 (age 40)
- Place of birth: San José, Costa Rica
- Height: 1.64 m (5 ft 5 in)
- Position: Midfielder

Youth career
- Alajuelense

Senior career*
Years	Team	Apps	(Gls)
2003–2007	Alajuelense	54	(3)
2007–2008	Puntarenas	19	(0)
2008–2011	Brujas	62	(21)
2011	Dorados de Sinaloa	12	(1)
2011–2012	Herediano	16	(0)
2012	Municipal	17	(2)
2013–2016	Herediano	99	(20)
2017	Sonsonate		
2017	Municipal Grecia	4	(1)
2018–2019	AD Guanacasteca		

International career
2009–2010	Costa Rica	5	(0)
- * Club domestic league appearances and goals

Yosimar Arias Céspedes (born 24 September 1986) is a Costa Rican former professional footballer who played as a midfielder.

== Club career ==
Arias started his career at Alajuelense and played for Puntarenas and Brujas before moving abroad for a spell in Mexico with Dorados de Sinaloa but was released in May 2011. He returned to Costa Rica when he signed by Herediano but then had another stint abroad with Guatemalan side Municipal whom he left in December 2012.

== International career ==
In 2003, Arias played at the FIFA U-17 World Championship. He made his senior debut for Costa Rica in a January 2009 UNCAF Nations Cup match against Panama and has earned a total of 5 caps, scoring no goal. He has represented his country at the 2009 UNCAF Nations Cup and the 2009 CONCACAF Gold Cup.

His final international was an October 2010 friendly match against El Salvador.
