= Jorge Barbosa (footballer) =

Brazilian footballer (born 1979)

Personal information
- Full name: Jorge Barbosa de Lima
- Date of birth: 6 August 1979 (age 47)
- Place of birth: Brasília, Brazil
- Height: 1.65 m (5 ft 5 in)
- Position: Forward

Senior career*
Years	Team	Apps	(Gls)
1999–2002	Ceres		
2002	Pérez Zeledón		
2002–2003	Osa		
2003–2004	Santa Bárbara		
2004–2006	Santos de Guápiles		
2006–2008	Puntarenas		
2008–2009	Brujas	24	(4)
2009–2010	Cartaginés	31	(11)
2010	Barrio México	10	(3)
2011–2012	Herediano	59	(11)
2012	Antigua		
2013	Herediano	12	(2)
2013–2015	UCR	52	(16)
2015–2016	Carmelita	20	(1)
2016	Puntarenas		
2016–2017	Barrio México		
2017–2018	Juventud Escazuceña		
2018–2019	Barrio México		
- * Club domestic league appearances and goals

Jorge Barbosa de Lima (born 6 August 1979) is a Brazilian former footballer who played as a forward.

== Club career ==
Barbos became the foreigner to play for most different clubs in Costa Rica when he joined Cartaginés in 2009. In April 2010, he joined Águilas Guanacastecas from Cartaginés but ended up playing for Barrio México.

=== Herediano ===
La Flecha Barbosa was the third highest goal scorer in the 2011-12 CONCACAF Champions League. He rejoined them from the Guatemalan side Antigua in January 2013, but was released by the club in June 2013.
