= Christian Suárez =

Ecuadorian footballer (born 1985)

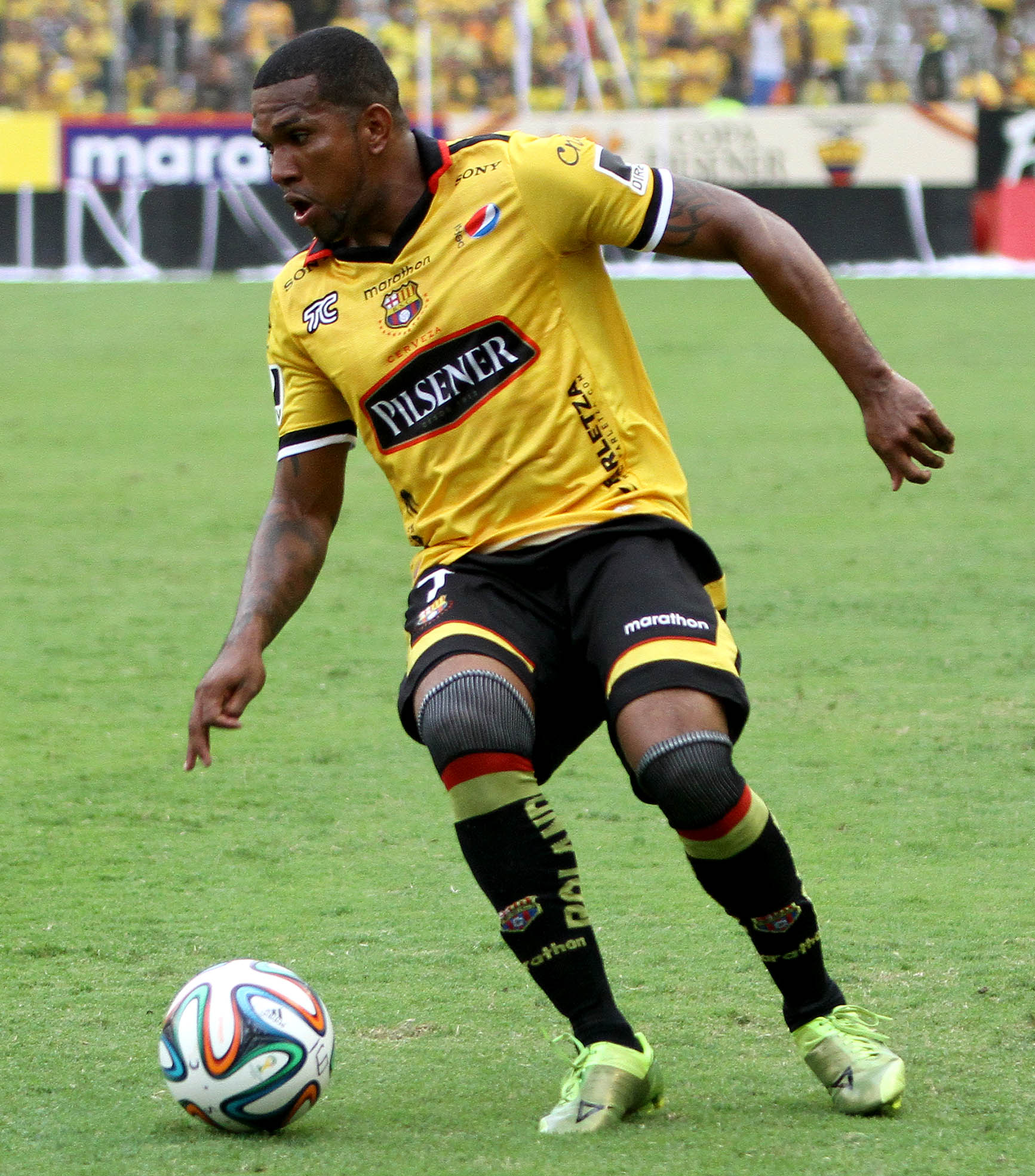
- Suárez while playing for Barcelona SC in 2014

Personal information
- Full name: Christian Andrés Suárez Valencia
- Date of birth: November 2, 1985 (age 40)
- Place of birth: Guayaquil, Ecuador
- Height: 1.75 m (5 ft 9 in)
- Positions: Attacking midfielder; winger

Senior career*
Years	Team	Apps	(Gls)
2007	Deportivo Azogues	29	(1)
2008	LDU Quito	18	(1)
2009	Olmedo	30	(10)
2010	→ El Nacional (loan)	38	(12)
2010–2011	Necaxa	16	(3)
2011–2012	Santos Laguna	53	(9)
2013	Pachuca	16	(2)
2014	Barcelona SC	25	(8)
2015–2016	Atlas	11	(1)
2015	→ Sinaloa (loan)	13	(2)
2016	Barcelona	16	(3)
2017	Guayaquil City	6	(0)

International career
2010–2013	Ecuador	10	(3)
- * Club domestic league appearances and goals as of 26 November 2017

Christian Andrés Suárez Valencia (born November 2, 1985, in Guayaquil) is an Ecuadorian footballer who last played for Guayaquil City.

== Club career ==
Suárez began his career with Deportivo Azogues in the Serie A of Ecuador. After his performances with the team, he soon got the attention of many clubs especially LDU Quito.

In 2008, Suárez transferred to LDU Quito as part of the squad who won the Copa Libertadores. Unfortunately, Suárez had little playing time and was only used as a substitute.

In 2009, Suárez joined Olmedo. He played regularly for the team as an attacking midfielder and set his teammates up to score goals. He finished the season with 10 impressive goals which made Olmedo take their option to buy him permanently.

In 2010, Suárez was loaned to El Nacional. He started the season as first choice striker where he didn't disappoint and became one of the league's top scorers. He ended the season with 12 goals.

In 2015, Suárez joined Atlas.

=== Club Necaxa ===
On December 14, 2010, Christian Suárez completed his transfer to Necaxa of Mexico, same club where legendary Ecuadorian midfielder, Alex Aguinaga, played. He scored his first goals coming in a game against Toluca in which he scored twice to give Necaxa a 2–3 victory. Santos Laguna

=== Santos Laguna ===
In May 2011, Suárez joined Santos Laguna of the Primera División Mexicana after Necaxa was relegated. Suárez occupied the extracomunitary player placer left by his compatriot Christian Benítez, who joined Club América. Suarez reached the Apertura 2011 League Final but came in second place to Tigres. After scoring 5 goals in the 2011–12 CONCACAF Champions League, Suarez again lost the final, this time to Club de Futbol Monterrey. After reaching his third final in Mexican football, Suarez won his first title with Santos Laguna, winning the Apertura 2012, against Monterrey.

== International career ==
Suárez was called up on October 12, 2010, to play against Poland. He scored his first international goal in a 2–0 friendly win versus Costa Rica on August 10, 2011.

=== International goals ===
#	Date	Venue	Opponent	Score	Final	Competition
1.	August 10, 2011	San José, Costa Rica	Costa Rica	0–1	0–2	Friendly
2.	September 2, 2011	Estadio Olímpico Atahualpa, Quito,	Jamaica	2–0	5–2	Friendly
3.	September 6, 2011	Estadio Olímpico Atahualpa, Quito,	Costa Rica	1–0	4–0	Friendly

== Honours ==
=== Club ===
LDU Quito

- Copa Libertadores (1): 2008

Santos Laguna

- Mexican Primera División (1): Clausura 2012
