= 2012–13 C.F. Monterrey season =

Monterrey
2012–13 season
- Chairman: Jorge Urdiales
- Manager: Víctor Manuel Vucetich
- Stadium: Estadio Tecnológico
- Apertura 2012: 7th Final Phase quarter-finals
- Clausura 2013: 11th Final Phase semi-finals
- Champions League: Winners
- FIFA Club World Cup: Third place
- Top goalscorer: League: Apertura: Humberto Suazo (6); Clausura: Aldo de Nigris (8); All: Aldo de Nigris (18)
- Highest home attendance: Apertura: 33,263 vs Atlante (August 18, 2012); Clausura: 33,420 vs América (May 15, 2013)
- Lowest home attendance: Apertura: 26,239 vs Tijuana (November 15, 2012); Clausura: 33,026 vs UANL (May 8, 2013)
Home colours	Away colours

The 2012–13 Monterrey season was the 66th professional season of Mexico's top-flight football league. The season is split into two tournaments—the Torneo Apertura and the Torneo Clausura—each with identical formats and each contested by the same eighteen teams. Monterrey began their season on July 21, 2012, against América, Monterrey play their homes games on Saturdays at 7:00pm local time. Monterrey reached the quarter-finals of the Final phase in the Apertura tournament and reached the semi-finals in the Clausura tournament. Monterrey won their third straight CONCACAF Champions League after defeating Santos Laguna 4–2 on aggregate and qualified to the 2013 FIFA Club World Cup. Monterrey ended up in third place at the 2012 FIFA Club World Cup after defeating Al Ahly of Egypt in the third place match.

== Torneo Apertura ==
=== Squad ===
Note: Flags indicate national team as defined under FIFA eligibility rules; some limited exceptions apply. Players may hold more than one non-FIFA nationality.

No.	Pos.	Nation	Player
1	GK	MEX	Jonathan Orozco
2	DF	MEX	Severo Meza
4	DF	MEX	Ricardo Osorio
5	DF	MEX	Darvin Chávez
6	DF	MEX	Héctor Morales
7	MF	MEX	Édgar Solís
9	FW	MEX	Aldo de Nigris (Vice-captain)
10	FW	MEX	Ángel Reyna
11	MF	ECU	Walter Ayoví
13	FW	MEX	Abraham Darío Carreño
14	MF	MEX	Jesús Manuel Corona
15	DF	ARG	José María Basanta (Captain)
16	MF	MEX	César de la Peña
17	MF	MEX	Jesús Zavala

No.	Pos.	Nation	Player
18	MF	ARG	Neri Cardozo
19	FW	ARG	César Delgado
21	DF	MEX	Hiram Mier
23	GK	MEX	Juan de Dios Ibarra
24	DF	MEX	Sergio Pérez
26	FW	CHI	Humberto Suazo
27	DF	MEX	Óscar Sebastián García
32	GK	MEX	Alejandro Dautt
65	FW	MEX	Marcelo Cazaubón
69	FW	MEX	Luis Madrigal
73	FW	MEX	Marcelo Gracia

=== Regular season ===
==== League table ====
Pos	Team	Pld	W	D	L	GF	GA	GD	Pts	Qualification
5	Morelia	17	6	9	2	25	16	+9	27	Advance to the Liguilla (Note: The first 8 places in the table qualify for the Playoffs.)
6	Cruz Azul	17	6	8	3	22	15	+7	26	Advance to the Liguilla
7	Monterrey	17	5	8	4	23	23	0	23	Advance to the Liguilla and cannot qualify for South American competitions (Note: Guadalajara, Monterrey, Santos Laguna and UANL cannot qualify for the 2013 Copa Libertadores because they are participating in the 2012–13 CONCACAF Champions League competition.)
8	Guadalajara	17	6	5	6	17	17	0	23	Advance to the Liguilla and cannot qualify for South American competitions
9	Santos Laguna	17	6	5	6	22	26	−4	23	Cannot qualify for South American competitions

Updated to match(es) played on 7 November 2012. Source: MedioTiempo
Rules for classification: 1) points; 2) goal difference; 3) number of goals scored.

==== Results ====
Win Draw Loss

July 21, 2012 Round 1	Monterrey	0–0	América	Monterrey, Nuevo León
19:00		Report	Juárez (yellow card) 63'	Stadium: Estadio Tecnológico; Referee: Jorge Isaac Rojas

July 27, 2012 Round 2	Morelia	1–0	Monterrey	Morelia, Michoacán
19:30	Romero (yellow card) 17'; Sabah 24', (yellow card) 89'; Salinas (yellow card) 54'; Morales (yellow card) 90'	Report	Morales (yellow card) 16'; Ayoví (yellow card) 72'; Meza (yellow card) 90'	Stadium: Estadio Morelos; Referee: Miguel Ángel Chacón

August 4, 2012 Round 3	Monterrey	2–1	Chiapas	Monterrey, Nuevo León
19:00	Morales 4'; Cardozo 31', (yellow card) 61'; Meza (yellow card) 74'; Zavala (yellow card) 89'	Report	Esqueda (yellow card) 2', (goal) 21'; Rangel (yellow card) 24'; Rodríguez (yellow card) 63'	Stadium: Estadio Tecnológico; Referee: Miguel Ángel Ayala

August 11, 2012 Round 4	San Luis	1–1	Monterrey	San Luis Potosí, San Luis Potosí
21:00	Paredes (yellow card) 5'; Rodríguez 48'; Fernández (yellow card) 49'; Velasco (yellow card) 70'; Cadavid (yellow card) 89'	Report	Suazo 9', (yellow card) 65'; Delgado (red card) 65'	Stadium: Estadio Alfonso Lastras; Attendance: 10,013; Referee: Fernando Guerrero

August 18, 2012 Round 5	Monterrey	1–1	Atlante	Monterrey, Nuevo León
19:00	Guagua 22' (o.g.); Corona (yellow card) 81'	Report	Venegas (red card) 73'; Martínez 84' (pen.)	Stadium: Estadio Tecnológico; Attendance: 33,268; Referee: Francisco Chacón

August 26, 2012 Round 6	Guadalajara	1–2	Monterrey	Zapopan, Jalisco
17:00	Márquez 16'; Fabián (yellow card) 38'	Report	Suazo 56', 61'	Stadium: Estadio Omnilife; Attendance: 27,467; Referee: Ricardo Arellano

September 1, 2012 Round 7	Monterrey	1–1	Atlas	Monterrey, Nuevo León
19:00	Cardozo 5'; Chávez (yellow card) 21'; Mier (yellow card) 60'	Report	Bocanegra (yellow card) 41'; Barraza 70'; Sandoval (yellow card) 75'; Robles (yellow card) 78'; Rodríguez (yellow card) 82'	Stadium: Estadio Tecnológico; Attendance: 33,251; Referee: Jorge Isaac Rojas

September 16, 2012 Round 8	Puebla	2–3	Monterrey	Puebla, Puebla
12:00	Gastélum (yellow card) 55'; De Buen 51'; Miranda (yellow card) 63'; Romo 71'; Pizano (yellow card) 72'	Report	Delgado 27'; Solís (yellow card) 44' de Nigris 45+3'; Basanta (yellow card) 58'; Reyna 75'	Stadium: Estadio Cuauhtémoc; Attendance: 10,132; Referee: Mauricio Morales

September 22, 2012 Round 9	Monterrey	3–2	Querétaro	Monterrey, Nuevo León
19:00	Morales (yellow card) 45+3'; Suazo (yellow card) 45+4'; Cardozo 49'; Orozco (yellow card) 58'; Carreño 69'; Mier (yellow card) 72'; Reyna 81'	Report	Bueno 14', (yellow card) 66'; Jiménez (yellow card) 52'; Guastavino 71'; Pineda (yellow card) 73'	Stadium: Estadio Tecnológico; Attendance: 33,105; Referee: Jorge Antonio Pérez

September 28, 2012 Round 10	León	2–0	Monterrey	León, Guanajuato
21:30	Montes (yellow card) 43', (goal) 57'; Peña (yellow card) 44'; Burbano 61'	Report	Pérez (yellow card) 4'; Cardozo (yellow card) 42'; Basanta (yellow card) 54'; Reyna (yellow card) 58'; Meza (yellow card) 69'	Stadium: Estadio León; Attendance: 23,042; Referee: Miguel Ángel Flores

October 4, 2012 Round 11	Monterrey	1–1	Tijuana	Monterrey, Nuevo León
21:00	Riascos 47' (o.g.); Reyna (yellow card) 72'	Report	Abrego 28'; Castillo (yellow card) 38'; Arce (yellow card) 45+3'; Moreno (yellow card) 70'; Gandolfi (yellow card) 74'	Stadium: Estadio Tecnológico; Attendance: 33,060; Referee: Fabricio Morales

October 7, 2012 Round 12	UNAM	3–2	Monterrey	Mexico City
12:00	Herrera (yellow card) 13'; Velarde 16'; Nieto (yellow card) 42'; Chiapas (yellow card) 47'; Basanta 54' (o.g.)	Report	Meza (yellow card) 1'; Basanta (yellow card) 15'; Morales (yellow card) 21', (goal) 62'; Delgado 32'; Mier (yellow card) 58'	Stadium: Estadio Olímpico Universitario; Attendance: 16,328; Referee: Marco Antonio Rodríguez

November 7, 2012 Round 13	Monterrey	2–2	Toluca	Monterrey, Nuevo León
20:30	Suazo 1', 75' (pen.); Basanta (yellow card) 29' (yellow-red card) 62'	Report	Rodríguez 20' (pen.), (yellow card) 36'; Benítez 23'; Dueñas (yellow card) 90'	Stadium: Estadio Tecnológico; Attendance: 28,060; Referee: Francisco Chacón

October 20, 2012 Round 14	Pachuca	1–1	Monterrey	Pachuca, Hidalgo
19:00	N. Castillo (yellow card) 36' da Silva (yellow card) 39'; Borja 48'	Report	Reyna 1' de Nigris (yellow card) 28'	Stadium: Estadio Hidalgo; Attendance: 21,194; Referee: Roberto García Orozco

October 27, 2012 Round 15	Monterrey	3–2	Santos Laguna	Monterrey, Nuevo León
19:00	Suazo 12'; Corona (yellow card) 34'; Cardozo (yellow card) 49'; Delgado 54'; Ayoví (yellow card) 62' de Nigris 58'	Report	Baloy (yellow card) 25'; Peralta 41'; Rodríguez (yellow card) 70'; Quintero (yellow card) 73'; Salinas (yellow card) 84'; Gómez 85'	Stadium: Estadio Tecnológico; Attendance: 26,935; Referee: Erim Ramírez

November 3, 2012 Round 16	Monterrey	0–1	UANL	Monterrey, Nuevo León
21:00	Pérez (yellow card) 35'	Report	Torres Nilo (yellow card) 24'; Lobos (yellow card) 54'; Pulido 62'; Jiménez (yellow card) 90+1'	Stadium: Estadio Tecnológico; Attendance: 32,233; Referee: Marco Antonio Rodríguez

November 10, 2012 Round 17	Cruz Azul	1–1	Monterrey	Mexico City
17:00	Pavone (yellow card) 14'; Giménez 23'; Flores (yellow card) 37'; Bravo (yellow card) 72'	Report	de Nigris 44'; Chávez (yellow card) 54'	Stadium: Estadio Azul; Attendance: 27,612; Referee: Fernando Guerrero

==== Final phase ====
November 15, 2012 Quarter-finals	Monterrey	0–1	Tijuana	Monterrey, Nuevo León
19:00	Ayoví (yellow card) 45'; Orozco (yellow card) 90+5'	Report	Gandolfi (yellow card) 44'; Leandro (yellow card) 72'; Garza 86'	Stadium: Estadio Tecnológico; Attendance: 26,239; Referee: Erim Ramírez

November 18, 2012 Quarter-finals	Tijuana	1–1	Monterrey	Tijuana, Baja California
16:30	Riascos (yellow card) 26'; Leandro (yellow card) 27'; Moreno (yellow card) 36'; Aguilar 51'	Report	Reyna (yellow card) 34'; Solís (yellow card) 89' de Nigris 90+3'	Stadium: Estadio Caliente; Attendance: 22,333; Referee: Roberto García Orozco

Tijuana advanced 2–1 on aggregate

=== Goalscorers ===
==== Regular season ====
Position	Nation	Name	Goals scored
1.	(Chile)	Humberto Suazo	6
2.	(Argentina)	Neri Cardozo	3
2.	(Mexico)	Aldo de Nigris	3
2.	(Argentina)	César Delgado	3
2.	(Mexico)	Ángel Reyna	3
6.	(Mexico)	Héctor Morales	2
6.		Own Goals	2
8.	(Mexico)	Darío Carreño	1
TOTAL			23

==== Final phase ====
Position	Nation	Name	Goals scored
1.	(Mexico)	Aldo de Nigris	1
TOTAL			1

=== Results ===
==== Results summary ====
Overall								Home						Away					
Pld	W	D	L	GF	GA	GD	Pts	W	D	L	GF	GA	GD	W	D	L	GF	GA	GD
17	5	8	4	23	23	0	23	3	5	0	13	10	+3	2	3	4	10	13	−3

Last updated: 10 November 2012.
Source: Apertura 2012 results

==== Results by round ====
Round	1	2	3	4	5	6	7	8	9	10	11	12	13	14	15	16	17
Ground	H	A	H	A	H	A	H	A	H	A	H	A	H	A	H	H	A
Result	D	L	W	D	D	W	D	W	W	L	D	L	D	D	W	L	D
Position	10	12	11	11	12	9	10	5	3	4	7	8	9	10	7	10	7

Updated to match(es) played on 11 November 2012. Source: Apertura 2012 results and mediotiempo.com
A = Away; H = Home; W = Win; D = Draw; L = Loss

== Torneo Clausura ==
=== Squad ===
Note: Flags indicate national team as defined under FIFA eligibility rules; some limited exceptions apply. Players may hold more than one non-FIFA nationality.

No.	Pos.	Nation	Player
1	GK	MEX	Jonathan Orozco
2	DF	MEX	Severo Meza
3	DF	MEX	Leobardo López
4	DF	MEX	Ricardo Osorio
5	DF	MEX	Darvin Chávez
6	DF	MEX	Héctor Morales
7	MF	MEX	Édgar Solís
8	MF	MEX	Gerardo Moreno
9	FW	MEX	Aldo de Nigris (vice-captain)
28	FW	MEX	Luis Madrigal
11	MF	ECU	Walter Ayoví
14	MF	MEX	Jesús Manuel Corona
15	DF	ARG	José María Basanta (captain)
16	MF	MEX	César de la Peña
17	MF	MEX	Jesús Zavala

No.	Pos.	Nation	Player
18	MF	ARG	Neri Cardozo
19	MF	ARG	César Delgado
20	DF	MEX	Óscar García
21	DF	MEX	Hiram Mier
23	GK	MEX	Juan de Dios Ibarra
26	FW	CHI	Humberto Suazo
27	FW	MEX	Omar Arellano
32	GK	MEX	Alejandro Dautt
41	DF	MEX	Luis López
47	MF	MEX	Félix Rodríguez
49	MF	MEX	Gael Acosta
51	FW	MEX	Marcelo Gracia
58	FW	MEX	Santiago Rivera
59	FW	MEX	Salvador Jasso
82	DF	MEX	Jorge Caballero

=== Regular season ===
==== League table ====
Pos	Team	Pld	W	D	L	GF	GA	GD	Pts	Qualification
7	UNAM	17	8	5	4	19	14	+5	29	Advance to the Final phase
8	Querétaro^{1}	17	6	6	5	18	20	−2	24	Disqualified from postseason competition (Note: Querétaro relegated to Ascenso MX for the 2013–14 season. Monterrey, at 9th place, promoted to the liguilla.)
9	Monterrey	17	7	2	8	22	22	0	23	Advance to the Final phase
10	Tijuana	17	6	3	8	19	21	−2	21	
11	Pachuca	17	6	2	9	18	25	−7	20	

Updated to match(es) played on May 4, 2013. Source: www.ligamx.net
Rules for classification: 1) points; 2) goal difference; 3) number of goals scored.

==== Results ====
Win Draw Loss

January 5, 2013 Round 1	América	2–1	Monterrey	Coyoacán, Mexico City
17:00	Herrera (red card) 28' (manager); Molina 39'; Sambueza 90+4' (pen.)	Report	Ayoví 15' (pen.); Basanta (yellow card) 29'; Cardozo (yellow card) 30'; Meza (yellow card) 71'	Stadium: Estadio Azteca; Attendance: 26,835; Referee: Ricardo Arellano

January 12, 2013 Round 2	Monterrey	1–0	Morelia	Monterrey, Nuevo León
19:00	Cardozo 7'; Basanta (yellow card) 45'	Report	Mancilla (red card) 44'; Álvarez (yellow card) 87'	Stadium: Estadio Tecnológico; Referee: Francisco Chacón

January 18, 2013 Round 3	Chiapas	1–1	Monterrey	Tuxtla Gutiérrez, Chiapas
19:30	Arizala 77'; Rodríguez (red card) 90+1'	Report	de Nigris 14'	Stadium: Estadio Victor Manuel Reyna; Attendance: 10,214; Referee: Marco Antonio Rodríguez

January 26, 2013 Round 4	Monterrey	3–2	San Luis	Monterrey, Nuevo León
19:00	López 13' de Nigris 18'; Meza (yellow card) 58'; Suzao (yellow card) 64'; Zavala 76'	Report	Córdoba (yellow card) 11'; Tréllez (yellow card) 40', (goal) 52'; Acuña (yellow card) 58'; Matos 67'; Muñoz Mustafá (yellow card) 79'; Esparza (yellow card) 90+2'	Stadium: Estadio Tecnológico; Attendance: 33,410; Referee: Fernando Guerrero

February 3, 2013 Round 5	Atlante	3–1	Monterrey	Cancún, Quintana Roo
18:00	Fonseca 47'; Maidana 71'; Paredes 76'; Muñoz (yellow card) 89'	Report	Basanta (yellow card) 39'; López (yellow card) 62' de Nigris 82'; Morales (yellow card) 90+1'	Stadium: Estadio Andrés Quintana Roo; Attendance: 6,779; Referee: Erim Ramírez

February 9, 2013 Round 6	Monterrey	0–1	Guadalajara	Monterrey, Nuevo León
19:00	Ayoví (yellow card) 17'; Zavala (yellow card) 40'; Delgado (yellow card) 84'	Report	Márquez 67', (yellow card) 84'; Enríquez (yellow card) 87'	Stadium: Estadio Tecnológico; Attendance: 33,377; Referee: José Alfredo Peñaloza

February 16, 2013 Round 7	Atlas	2–1	Monterrey	Guadalajara, Jalisco
21:00	Chávez 36'; Bravo 54'	Report	Arellano 7'; Ayoví (yellow card) 14'; Suazo (yellow card) 21'	Stadium: Estadio Jalisco; Referee: Jorge Antonio Pérez

February 23, 2012 Round 8	Monterrey	3–0	Puebla	Monterrey, Nuevo León
19:00	de Nigris 23', 70', (yellow card) 85'; Suazo 55' (pen.)	Report	González (yellow card) 43'; Orozco (red card) 53'; Noriega (yellow card) 71'	Stadium: Estadio Tecnológico; Referee: Jorge Isaac Rojas

March 2, 2013 Round 9	Querétaro	1–0	Monterrey	Querétaro, Querétaro
17:00	Cosme 3'; Nava (yellow card) 52'; Apodi (yellow card) 73'; Osuna (yellow card) 90'	Report	Chávez (yellow card) 44'; Zavala (yellow card) 90'; Basanta (yellow card) 90+2'	Stadium: Estadio Corregidora; Attendance: 8,494; Referee: Paul Enrique Delgadillo

March 9, 2013 Round 10	Monterrey	2–1	León	Monterrey, Nuevo León
19:00	Zavala 21', 80', (yellow card) 76'; Suazo (yellow card) 84'; Meza (yellow card) 89'	Report	González (yellow card) 35'; Britos 35'; Márquez (yellow card) 50'; Montes (yellow card) 68'	Stadium: Estadio Tecnológico; Attendance: 33,355; Referee: Fernando Guerrero

March 16, 2013 Round 11	Tijuana	2–2	Monterrey	Tijuana, Baja California
21:00	Martínez 27', (yellow card) 80'; Núñez (yellow card) 33'; Gandolfi (yellow card) 46'; Riascos (yellow card) 35', (goal) 87'; Moreno (yellow card) 80'	Report	de Nigris 31'; Riascos 34' (o.g.); Zavala (yellow card) 56'; Cardozo (yellow card) 58'; Ayoví (yellow card) 65'	Stadium: Estadio Caliente; Attendance: 23,133; Referee: Miguel Ángel Ayala

March 30, 2013 Round 12	Monterrey	3–0	UNAM	Monterrey, Nuevo León
19:00	Ayoví (yellow card) 11'; Arellano (yellow card) 34' de Nigris (yellow card) 68'; Madrigal 79'; Suazo (yellow card) 85', (goal) 86'; A. Palacios (yellow card) 88'; Delgado 90+2'	Report	Bravo (yellow card) 21'; Cortés (yellow card) 32'; Verón (yellow card) 68'	Stadium: Estadio Tecnológico; Attendance: 33,410; Referee: Miguel Ángel Ortega

April 7, 2013 Round 13	Toluca	1–0	Monterrey	Toluca, Estado de México
17:00	Sinha (yellow card) 28'; Cacho 71'	Report	Meza (yellow card) 15'; Solís (yellow card) 90+2'	Stadium: Estadio Nemesio Díez; Referee: Miguel Ángel Chacón

April 13, 2013 Round 14	Monterrey	2–0	Pachuca	Monterrey, Nuevo León
19:00	Zavala (yellow card) 7'; Corona 26'; Ayoví (yellow card) 36'; Delgado (yellow card) 50'; Meza (yellow card) 50'; Cardozo 72'	Report	Marrugo (yellow card) 83'	Stadium: Estadio Tecnológico; Attendance: 33,292; Referee: José Alfredo Peñaloza

April 19, 2013 Round 15	Santos Laguna	1–0	Monterrey	Torreón, Coahuila
21:30	Baloy 17'; Figueroa (yellow card) 46'; Peralta (yellow card) 83'; Crosas (yellow card) 84'	Report	Orozco (yellow card) 17'; Cardozo (yellow card) 42'; Basanta (yellow card) 67'; Hernández (yellow card) 84'	Stadium: Estadio Corona; Attendance: 24,716; Referee: Jorge Isaac Rojas

April 27, 2013 Round 16	UANL	0–1	Monterrey	San Nicolás de los Garzas, Nuevo León
19:00	Torres Nilo (yellow card) 42'; Villa (yellow card) 63'	Report	Suazo (yellow card) 34'; Delgado (yellow card) 36'; López 46'	Stadium: Estadio Universitario; Attendance: 40,680; Referee: Jorge Antonio Pérez

May 4, 2013 Round 17	Monterrey	1–5	Cruz Azul	Monterrey, Nuevo León
19:00	Delgado 61'	Report	T. Gutiérrez 21'; Perea 34'; Pavone 57', 71', 80'	Stadium: Estadio Tecnológico; Attendance: 33,330; Referee: César Arturo Ramos

=== Final phase ===
May 8, 2013 Quarter-finals	Monterrey	1–0	UANL	Monterrey, Nuevo León
19:00	Suazo 19'; Basanta (yellow card) 76'; Meza (yellow card) 90+1'	Report	Rivas (yellow card) 8'; Juninho (yellow card) 62'	Stadium: Estadio Tecnológico; Attendance: 33,026; Referee: José Alfredo Peñaloza

May 11, 2013 Quarter-finals	UANL	1–1	Monterrey	San Nicolás de los Garza, Nuevo León
19:00	Danilinho 12', (yellow card) 45+1' (yellow-red card) 79'; Rivas (yellow card) 80'	Report	Arellano (yellow card) 26'; Jiménez 33' (o.g.); Zavala (yellow card) 53'; Ibarra (yellow card) 83'; Suazo (yellow card) 88'	Stadium: Estadio Universitario; Attendance: 40,435; Referee: Roberto García Orozco

Monterrey advanced 2–1 on aggregate

May 15, 2013 Semi-finals	Monterrey	2–2	América	Monterrey, Nuevo León
21:00	Suazo 28' de Nigris (yellow card) 39', (goal) 73'	Report	Molina (yellow card) 27'; Benítez 50', 70'; Sambueza (yellow card) 68'	Stadium: Estadio Tecnológico; Attendance: 33,420; Referee: Jorge Antonio Pérez

May 18, 2013 Semi-finals	América	2–1	Monterrey	Coyoacán, Mexico City
17:00	Jiménez 63', (yellow card) 86'; Benítez 82'; Molina (yellow card) 86'	Report	Meza (yellow card) 36'; López (yellow card) 62' de Nigris (yellow card) 87', (goal) 90+2'	Stadium: Estadio Azteca; Attendance: 71,236; Referee: Paul Delgadillo

América advanced 4–3 on aggregate

=== Goalscorers ===
==== Regular season ====
Position	Nation	Name	Goals scored
1.	(Mexico)	Aldo de Nigris	6
2.	(Mexico)	Jesús Zavala	3
3.	(Argentina)	Neri Cardozo	2
3.	(Argentina)	César Delgado	2
3.	(Mexico)	Leobardo López	2
3.	(Chile)	Humberto Suazo	2
7.	(Mexico)	Omar Arellano	1
7.	(Ecuador)	Walter Ayoví	1
7.	(Mexico)	Jesús Manuel Corona	1
7.	(Mexico)	Guillermo Madrigal	1
7.		Own Goals	1
TOTAL			22

==== Final phase ====
Position	Nation	Name	Goals scored
1.	(Mexico)	Aldo de Nigris	2
1.	(Chile)	Humberto Suazo	2
1.		Own Goals	1
TOTAL			5

=== Results ===
==== Results summary ====
Overall								Home						Away					
Pld	W	D	L	GF	GA	GD	Pts	W	D	L	GF	GA	GD	W	D	L	GF	GA	GD
17	7	2	8	23	21	+2	23	6	0	2	15	9	+6	1	2	6	8	12	−4

Last updated: 4 May 2013.
Source: Clausura 2013 results

==== Results by round ====
Round	1	2	3	4	5	6	7	8	9	10	11	12	13	14	15	16	17
Ground	A	H	A	H	A	H	A	H	A	H	A	H	A	H	A	A	H
Result	L	W	D	W	L	L	L	W	L	W	D	W	L	W	L	W	L
Position	15	8	11	7	7	11	12	12	14	11	11	8	12	8	9	9	9

Updated to match(es) played on 5 May 2013. Source: Clausura 2013 results and mediotiempo.com
A = Away; H = Home; W = Win; D = Draw; L = Loss

== CONCACAF Champions League ==
=== Group stage ===
Team	Pld	W	D	L	GF	GA	GD	Pts	Qualification	MON	MUN	CHO
(Mexico) Monterrey	4	4	0	0	15	0	+15	12	Advance to championship round		3–0	5–0
(Guatemala) Municipal	4	2	0	2	4	6	−2	6		0–1		2–1
(Panama) Chorrillo	4	0	0	4	2	15	−13	0		0–6	1–2	

Legend: Blue = home team win; Yellow = draw; Red = away team win.
July 31, 2012
20:00

Monterrey (Mexico)	5–0	(Panama) Chorrillo
Basanta 7'; Reyna 45', 78', 88'; Carreño 83'	Report

Estadio Tecnológico, Monterrey
Attendance: 15,260
Referee: Hugo Cruz (Costa Rica)

August 29, 2012
22:00

Municipal (Guatemala)	0–1	(Mexico) Monterrey
	Report	Suazo 79'

Estadio Mateo Flores, Guatemala City
Attendance: 7,859
Referee: Joel Aguilar (El Salvador)

September 25, 2012
22:00

Monterrey (Mexico)	3–0	(Guatemala) Municipal
Carreño 13'; Solórzano 53' (o.g.); Cardozo 81'	Report

Estadio Tecnológico, Monterrey
Attendance: 24,721
Referee: José Pineda (Honduras)

October 23, 2012
22:00

Chorrillo (Panama)	0–6	(Mexico) Monterrey
	Report	Carreño 11'; Suazo 25', 50'; Corona 28'; Cardozo 58'; Madrigal 90+3'

Estadio Rommel Fernández, Panama City
Attendance: 130
Referee: William Anderson (Puerto Rico)

=== Championship round ===
==== Quarterfinals ====
March 6, 2013 First leg	Xelajú (Guatemala)	1–3	(Mexico) Monterrey	Quetzaltenango, Guatemala
20:00	Estacuy 58'	Report	Mier 9' de Nigris 43'; Corona 76'	Stadium: Estadio Mario Camposeco; Attendance: 4,553; Referee: Silviu Petrescu (Canada)

March 12, 2013 Second leg	Monterrey (Mexico)	1–1 (4–2 agg.)	(Guatemala) Xelajú	Monterrey, Mexico
20:00	Ayoví 64'	Report	Santiago 44'	Stadium: Estadio Tecnológico; Attendance: 30,440; Referee: Marcos Brea (Cuba)

==== Semifinals ====
April 3, 2013 First leg	Los Angeles Galaxy (United States)	1–2	(Mexico) Monterrey	Carson, United States
19:00 PDT	DeLaGarza 28'; DeLaGarza (yellow card) 86'	Report	Mier (yellow card) 37'; Suazo 82'; Osorio (yellow card) 89' de Nigris 90' de Nigris (yellow card) 91+'	Stadium: The Home Depot Center; Attendance: 21,745; Referee: Hugo Cruz (Costa Rica)

April 10, 2013 Second leg	Monterrey (Mexico)	1–0 (3–1 agg.)	(United States) Los Angeles Galaxy	Monterrey, Mexico
19:00PDT	de Nigris 81'	Report	McBean (yellow card) 86'	Stadium: Estadio Tecnológico; Attendance: 32,234; Referee: Roberto Moreno (Panama)

=== Final ===
April 24, 2013 First leg	Santos Laguna (Mexico)	0–0	(Mexico) Monterrey	Torreón, Mexico
21:00 UTC−5	Qunitero (yellow card) 8'; Lugo (yellow card) 23'; Estrada (yellow card) 25'	Report	Zavala (yellow card) 17'; Suazo (yellow card) 19'; Delgado (red card) 65'	Stadium: Estadio Corona; Attendance: 21,401; Referee: Roberto García (Mexico)

May 1, 2013 Second leg	Monterrey (Mexico)	4–2 (4–2 agg.)	(Mexico) Santos Laguna	Monterrey, Mexico
21:00 UTC−5	Basanta (yellow card) 31'; Solís (yellow card) 43'; Madrigal (yellow card) 47' de Nigris 60', 87', (yellow card) 87'; Cardozo 84'; Suazo (yellow card) 86', (goal) 90+1'	Report	Baloy (yellow card) 35', (goal) 50'; Quintero 38'; Gómez (yellow card) 63'; Peralta (yellow card) 85'	Stadium: Estadio Tecnológico; Attendance: 33,667; Referee: Marco Rodríguez (Mexico)
