= 2013 CONCACAF Champions League final =

- Event: 2012–13 CONCACAF Champions League
Santos Laguna	Monterrey
(Mexico)	(Mexico)
2	4
- on aggregate

First leg
Santos Laguna	Monterrey
0	0
- Date: 24 April 2013
- Venue: Estadio Corona, Torreón
- Referee: Roberto García (Mexico)
- Attendance: 21,401

Second leg
Monterrey	Santos Laguna
4	2
- Date: 1 May 2013
- Venue: Estadio Tecnológico, Monterrey
- Referee: Marco Rodríguez (Mexico)
- Attendance: 33,667

The 2013 CONCACAF Champions League final was the final of the 2012–13 CONCACAF Champions League, the 5th edition of the CONCACAF Champions League under its current format, and overall the 48th edition of the premium football club competition organized by CONCACAF, the regional governing body of North America, Central America, and the Caribbean.

The final was contested in two-legged home-and-away format between two Mexican teams, Santos Laguna and Monterrey. The first leg was hosted by Santos Laguna at Estadio Corona in Torreón on 24 April 2013, while the second leg was hosted by Monterrey at Estadio Tecnológico in Monterrey on 1 May 2013. The winner earned the right to represent CONCACAF at the 2013 FIFA Club World Cup, entering at the quarterfinal stage.

The first leg ended in a 0–0 draw. Monterrey won the second leg 4–2 after overcoming a two-goal deficit, winning the final 4–2 on aggregate.

== Background ==
For the fourth time in five seasons of the CONCACAF Champions League, the final was played between two Mexican sides. This guaranteed a Mexican champion for the eighth straight year and 29th time since the confederation began staging the tournament in 1962 (including the tournament's predecessor, the CONCACAF Champions' Cup). The final was also a repeat of previous year's final, won by Monterrey over Santos Laguna 3–2 on aggregate. Monterrey were the two-time defending champions, having also won the final in 2011.

Santos Laguna finished top of Group 1 ahead of Toronto FC and Águila in the group stage, and were seeded second for the championship stage, where they eliminated Houston Dynamo in the quarterfinals and Seattle Sounders FC in the semifinals.

Monterrey finished top of Group 7 ahead of Municipal and Chorrillo in the group stage, and were seeded first for the championship stage, where they eliminated Xelajú in the quarterfinals and Los Angeles Galaxy in the semifinals.

== Road to the final ==
Note: In all results below, the score of the finalist is given first.

(Mexico) Santos Laguna				Round	(Mexico) Monterrey			
Opponent	Result			Group stage	Opponent	Result		
Bye				Matchday 1	(Panama) Chorrillo	5–0 (H)		
(El Salvador) Águila	5–0 (H)			Matchday 2	Bye			
(Canada) Toronto FC	3–1 (A)			Matchday 3	(Guatemala) Municipal	1–0 (A)		
(El Salvador) Águila	4–0 (A)			Matchday 4	Bye			
Bye				Matchday 5	(Guatemala) Municipal	3–0 (H)		
(Canada) Toronto FC	1–0 (H)			Matchday 6	(Panama) Chorrillo	6–0 (A)		
Group 1 winner: Team / Pld / W / D / L / GF / GA / GD / Pts / Qualification; (Mexico) Santos Laguna / 4 / 4 / 0 / 0 / 13 / 1 / +12 / 12 / Advance to championship round; (Canada) Toronto FC / 4 / 2 / 0 / 2 / 9 / 5 / +4 / 6; (El Salvador) Águila / 4 / 0 / 0 / 4 / 1 / 17 / −16 / 0; Source:				Final standings	Group 7 winner: Team / Pld / W / D / L / GF / GA / GD / Pts / Qualification; (Mexico) Monterrey / 4 / 4 / 0 / 0 / 15 / 0 / +15 / 12 / Advance to championship round; (Guatemala) Municipal / 4 / 2 / 0 / 2 / 4 / 6 / −2 / 6; (Panama) Chorrillo / 4 / 0 / 0 / 4 / 2 / 15 / −13 / 0; Source:			
Opponent	Agg.	1st leg	2nd leg	Championship stage	Opponent	Agg.	1st leg	2nd leg
(United States) Houston Dynamo	3–1	0–1 (A)	3–0 (H)	Quarterfinals	(Guatemala) Xelajú	4–2	3–1 (A)	1–1 (H)
(United States) Seattle Sounders FC	2–1	1–0 (A)	1–1 (H)	Semifinals	(United States) Los Angeles Galaxy	3–1	2–1 (A)	1–0 (H)

== Rules ==
The final was played on a home-and-away two-legged basis. The away goals rule was used if the aggregate score was level after normal time of the second leg, but not after extra time, and so the final was decided by penalty shoot-out if the aggregate score was level after extra time of the second leg.

== Matches ==
=== First leg ===
24 April 2013
21:00 UTC−5

Santos Laguna (Mexico)	0–0	(Mexico) Monterrey
	Report

Estadio Corona, Torreón
Attendance: 21,401
Referee: Roberto García (Mexico)

Santos Laguna	Monterrey

GK	1	(Mexico) Oswaldo Sánchez (c)
DF	23	(Panama) Felipe Baloy
DF	4	(Mexico) Jorge Iván Estrada	(yellow card) 25'
DF	20	(Mexico) Osmar Mares
DF	19	(Mexico) Rafael Figueroa
MF	17	(Mexico) Rodolfo Salinas		(substituted off) 85'
MF	8	(Mexico) Juan Pablo Rodríguez
MF	7	(Mexico) Édgar Lugo	(yellow card) 23'	(substituted off) 77'
FW	24	(Mexico) Oribe Peralta		(substituted off) 53'
FW	3	(Colombia) Carlos Quintero	(yellow card) 8'
FW	64	(Mexico) Mario Cárdenas
Substitutions:
FW	16	(United States) Herculez Gomez		(substituted on) 53'
MF	10	(Argentina) Mauro Cejas		(substituted on) 77'
MF	11	(Mexico) Néstor Calderón		(substituted on) 85'
Manager:
(Portugal) Pedro Caixinha

GK	1	(Mexico) Jonathan Orozco
DF	15	(Argentina) José María Basanta (c)
DF	3	(Mexico) Leobardo López
DF	21	(Mexico) Hiram Mier
MF	7	(Mexico) Edgar Solís
MF	17	(Mexico) Jesús Zavala	(yellow card) 17'
MF	11	(Ecuador) Walter Ayoví
MF	14	(Mexico) Jesús Manuel Corona		(substituted off) 65'
MF	19	(Argentina) César Delgado	(red card) 65'
FW	26	(Chile) Humberto Suazo	(yellow card) 19'	(substituted off) 87'
FW	9	(Mexico) Aldo de Nigris		(substituted off) 79'
Substitutions:
MF	45	(Mexico) Gerardo Moreno		(substituted on) 65'
DF	5	(Mexico) Dárvin Chávez		(substituted on) 79'
FW	56	(Mexico) Guillermo Madrigal		(substituted on) 87'
Manager:
(Mexico) Víctor Manuel Vucetich

Assistant referees:
Alberto Morín (Mexico)
José Luis Camargo (Mexico)
Fourth official:
José Alfredo Peñaloza (Mexico)

=== Second leg ===
1 May 2013
21:00 UTC−5

Monterrey (Mexico)	4–2	(Mexico) Santos Laguna
De Nigris 60', 87'; Cardozo 84'; Suazo 90+1'	Report	Quintero 38'; Baloy 50'

Estadio Tecnológico, Monterrey
Attendance: 33,667
Referee: Marco Rodríguez (Mexico)

Monterrey	Santos Laguna

GK	1	(Mexico) Jonathan Orozco
DF	15	(Argentina) José María Basanta (c)	(yellow card) 31'	(substituted off) 55'
DF	3	(Mexico) Leobardo López
DF	21	(Mexico) Hiram Mier
DF	5	(Mexico) Dárvin Chávez		(substituted off) 69'
MF	7	(Mexico) Edgar Solís	(yellow card) 43'	(substituted off) 46'
MF	17	(Mexico) Jesús Zavala
MF	11	(Ecuador) Walter Ayoví
MF	14	(Mexico) Jesús Manuel Corona
FW	26	(Chile) Humberto Suazo	(yellow card) 86'
FW	9	(Mexico) Aldo de Nigris	(yellow card) 87'
Substitutions:
FW	56	(Mexico) Guillermo Madrigal	(yellow card) 47'	(substituted on) 46'
DF	2	(Mexico) Severo Meza		(substituted on) 55'
FW	18	(Argentina) Neri Cardozo		(substituted on) 69'
Manager:
(Mexico) Víctor Manuel Vucetich

GK	1	(Mexico) Oswaldo Sánchez (c)
DF	23	(Panama) Felipe Baloy	(yellow card) 35'
DF	4	(Mexico) Jorge Iván Estrada
DF	20	(Mexico) Osmar Mares
DF	19	(Mexico) Rafael Figueroa
MF	17	(Mexico) Rodolfo Salinas
MF	8	(Mexico) Juan Pablo Rodríguez
MF	7	(Mexico) Édgar Lugo		(substituted off) 66'
FW	24	(Mexico) Oribe Peralta	(yellow card) 85'
FW	3	(Colombia) Carlos Quintero		(substituted off) 82'
FW	64	(Mexico) Mario Cárdenas		(substituted off) 63'
Substitutions:
FW	16	(United States) Herculez Gomez	(yellow card) 72'	(substituted on) 63'
MF	6	(Spain) Marc Crosas		(substituted on) 66'
MF	10	(Argentina) Mauro Cejas		(substituted on) 82'
Manager:
(Portugal) Pedro Caixinha

Assistant referees:
Marvin Torrentera (Mexico)
Marcos Quintero (Mexico)
Fourth official:
Erim Ramírez (Mexico)
