= 2012–13 CONCACAF Champions League group stage =

The group stage of the 2012–13 CONCACAF Champions League was played from July 31 to October 25, 2012. A total of 24 teams competed in the group stage.

== Draw ==
The draw for the group stage was held on June 5, 2012, beginning at 11:00 EDT (UTC−4), at the CONCACAF headquarters in New York City.

The 24 teams were drawn into eight groups of three, with each group containing one team from each of the three pots. The allocation of teams into pots was based on their national association and qualifying berth. Teams from the same association (excluding "wildcard" teams which replace a team from another association) could not be drawn with each other in the group stage, and each group was guaranteed to contain a team from either the United States or Mexico, meaning U.S. and Mexican teams could not play each other in the group stage.

== Seeding ==
The following were the group stage seeding of the 24 teams which qualified for the Champions League:

Pot A
(Mexico) UANL	(Mexico) Santos Laguna	(United States) Los Angeles Galaxy	(United States) Seattle Sounders FC
(Costa Rica) Herediano	(Honduras) Olimpia	(Guatemala) Xelajú	(Panama) Chorrillo
Pot B
(Mexico) Guadalajara	(Mexico) Monterrey	(United States) Houston Dynamo	(United States) Real Salt Lake
(Costa Rica) Alajuelense	(Honduras) Marathón	(El Salvador) Isidro Metapán	(Canada) Toronto FC
Pot C
(Guatemala) Municipal	(Panama) Tauro	(El Salvador) Águila	(Nicaragua) Real Estelí
(El Salvador) FAS	(Trinidad and Tobago) Caledonia AIA	(Trinidad and Tobago) W Connection	Puerto Rico Islanders

== Format ==
In the group stage, each group was played on a home-and-away round-robin basis. The winners of each group advanced to the championship stage.

=== Tiebreakers ===
In each group, teams are ranked according to points (3 points for a win, 1 point for a tie, 0 points for a loss). If tied on points, tiebreakers are applied in the following order:

1. Greater number of points earned in matches between the teams concerned
2. Greater goal difference in matches between the teams concerned
3. Greater number of goals scored away from home in matches between the teams concerned
4. Reapply first three criteria if two or more teams are still tied
5. Greater goal difference in all group matches
6. Greater number of goals scored in group matches
7. Greater number of goals scored away in all group matches
8. Drawing of lots

== Groups ==
The matchdays were July 31–August 2, August 21–23, August 28–30, September 18–20, September 25–27, and October 23–25, 2012.

All times U.S. Eastern Daylight Time (UTC−4)

=== Group 1 ===
Team	Pld	W	D	L	GF	GA	GD	Pts	Qualification	SAN	TOR	ÁGU
(Mexico) Santos Laguna	4	4	0	0	13	1	+12	12	Advance to championship round		1–0	5–0
(Canada) Toronto FC	4	2	0	2	9	5	+4	6		1–3		5–1
(El Salvador) Águila	4	0	0	4	1	17	−16	0		0–4	0–3	

August 1, 2012
20:00

Toronto FC (Canada)	5–1	(El Salvador) Águila
Silva 9'; Lambe 17', 48'; Dunfield 40'; Johnson 58'	Report	Pérez 37'

BMO Field, Toronto
Attendance: 5,324
Referee: Javier Santos (Puerto Rico)

August 21, 2012
20:00

Santos Laguna (Mexico)	5–0	(El Salvador) Águila
Quintero 6', 26', 47'; Lugo 30'; Ludueña 41'	Report

Estadio Corona, Torreón
Attendance: 4,662
Referee: Edvin Jurisevic (United States)

August 28, 2012
20:00

Toronto FC (Canada)	1–3	(Mexico) Santos Laguna
Amarikwa 68'	Report	Quintero 49'; Ludueña 90'; Ramírez 90+2'

BMO Field, Toronto
Attendance: 10,951
Referee: Walter López (Guatemala)

September 19, 2012
22:00

Águila (El Salvador)	0–4	(Mexico) Santos Laguna
	Report	Escoboza 49', 62'; Galindo 56'; Crosas 77' (pen.)

Estadio Cuscatlán, San Salvador
Attendance: 799
Referee: Henry Bejarano (Costa Rica)

September 25, 2012
22:00

Águila (El Salvador)	0–3	(Canada) Toronto FC
	Report	Amarikwa 16'; Dunfield 40', 86'

Estadio Cuscatlán, San Salvador
Attendance: 319
Referee: José Luis Rodríguez (Panama)

October 24, 2012
20:00

Santos Laguna (Mexico)	1–0	(Canada) Toronto FC
Gomez 73'	Report

Estadio Corona, Torreon
Attendance: 7,478
Referee: Héctor Rodríguez (Honduras)

=== Group 2 ===
Team	Pld	W	D	L	GF	GA	GD	Pts	Qualification	HER	RSL	TAU
(Costa Rica) Herediano	4	3	1	0	4	1	+3	10	Advance to championship round		1–0	2–1
(United States) Real Salt Lake	4	2	1	1	3	1	+2	7		0–0		2–0
(Panama) Tauro	4	0	0	4	1	6	−5	0		0–1	0–1	

July 31, 2012
22:00

Herediano (Costa Rica)	1–0	(United States) Real Salt Lake
Aguilar 14'	Report

Estadio Nacional de Costa Rica, San José
Attendance: 2,677
Referee: Francisco Chacón (Mexico)

August 21, 2012
22:00

Real Salt Lake (United States)	2–0	(Panama) Tauro
Saborío 48'; Beckerman 58'	Report

Rio Tinto Stadium, Sandy
Attendance: 20,430
Referee: Oscar Reyna (Guatemala)

August 30, 2012
20:00

Tauro (Panama)	0–1	(Costa Rica) Herediano
	Report	Francis 48'

Estadio Rommel Fernández, Panama City
Attendance: 2,398
Referee: Marcos Brea (Cuba)

September 18, 2012
20:00

Tauro (Panama)	0–1	(United States) Real Salt Lake
	Report	Saborío 90+4' (pen.)

Estadio Rommel Fernández, Panama City
Attendance: 674
Referee: Mauricio Morales (Mexico)

September 25, 2012
22:00

Herediano (Costa Rica)	2–1	(Panama) Tauro
Salazar 8' (pen.); Pérez 36'	Report	Aguilar 18'

Estadio Eladio Rosabal Cordero, Heredia
Attendance: 3,000
Referee: Javier Santos (Puerto Rico)

October 23, 2012
22:00

Real Salt Lake (United States)	0–0	(Costa Rica) Herediano
	Report

Rio Tinto Stadium, Sandy
Attendance: 20,436
Referee: Elmer Bonilla (El Salvador)

=== Group 3 ===
Team	Pld	W	D	L	GF	GA	GD	Pts	Qualification	HOU	OLI	FAS
(United States) Houston Dynamo	4	2	2	0	9	3	+6	8	Advance to championship round		1–1	4–0
(Honduras) Olimpia	4	1	2	1	6	4	+2	5		1–1		3–0
(El Salvador) FAS	4	1	0	3	3	11	−8	3		1–3	2–1	

August 2, 2012
22:00

Olimpia (Honduras)	3–0	(El Salvador) FAS
Luciano Emílio 2'; García 17'; Rojas 75'	Report

Estadio Francisco Morazán, San Pedro Sula
Attendance: 4,898
Referee: Jafeth Perea (Panama)

August 22, 2012
22:00

FAS (El Salvador)	1–3	(United States) Houston Dynamo
Águila 64'	Report	Ching 12'; Weaver 19'; Sarkodie 60'

Estadio Cuscatlán, San Salvador
Attendance: 2,510
Referee: Marcos Brea (Cuba)

August 30, 2012
22:00

Olimpia (Honduras)	1–1	(United States) Houston Dynamo
Caetano 6'	Report	Moffat 57'

Estadio Tiburcio Carías Andino, Tegucigalpa
Attendance: 3,645
Referee: Marco Rodríguez (Mexico)

September 20, 2012
20:00

Houston Dynamo (United States)	4–0	(El Salvador) FAS
Barnes 21'; Boswell 44'; Weaver 49'; Carr 78'	Report

BBVA Compass Stadium, Houston
Attendance: 16,117
Referee: Francisco Chacón (Mexico)

September 27, 2012
22:00

FAS (El Salvador)	2–1	(Honduras) Olimpia
Bentos 78'; Moscoso 90'	Report	Portillo 65'

Estadio Cuscatlán, San Salvador
Attendance: 1,640
Referee: Wálter Quesada (Costa Rica)

October 23, 2012
20:00

Houston Dynamo (United States)	1–1	(Honduras) Olimpia
Hainault 65'	Report	Caetano 21'

BBVA Compass Stadium, Houston
Attendance: 19,462
Referee: Juan Guerra (Guatemala)

=== Group 4 ===
Team	Pld	W	D	L	GF	GA	GD	Pts	Qualification	SEA	MAR	CAL
(United States) Seattle Sounders FC	4	4	0	0	12	5	+7	12	Advance to championship round		3–1	3–1
(Honduras) Marathón	4	1	1	2	5	7	−2	4		2–3		2–1
(Trinidad and Tobago) Caledonia AIA	4	0	1	3	3	8	−5	1		1–3	0–0	

August 2, 2012
22:00

Seattle Sounders FC (United States)	3–1	(Trinidad and Tobago) Caledonia AIA
Ochoa 19'; Montero 30'; Rose 43'	Report	Joseph 50' (pen.)

CenturyLink Field, Seattle
Attendance: 7,767
Referee: Stanley Lancaster (Guyana)

August 22, 2012
20:00

Caledonia AIA (Trinidad and Tobago)	0–0	(Honduras) Marathón
	Report

Ato Boldon Stadium, Couva
Attendance: 491
Referee: Stanley Lancaster (Guyana)

August 30, 2012
20:00

Caledonia AIA (Trinidad and Tobago)	1–3	(United States) Seattle Sounders FC
Joseph 66' (pen.)	Report	Caskey 45'; Ochoa 60'; Montero 68'

Ato Boldon Stadium, Couva
Attendance: 556
Referee: Javier Santos (Puerto Rico)

September 19, 2012
22:00

Marathón (Honduras)	2–3	(United States) Seattle Sounders FC
Berríos 35' (pen.), 68' (pen.)	Report	Ochoa 11'; Johnson 62'; Evans 78'

Estadio Olímpico Metropolitano, San Pedro Sula
Attendance: 968
Referee: Marlon Mejía (El Salvador)

September 26, 2012
22:00

Marathón (Honduras)	2–1	(Trinidad and Tobago) Caledonia AIA
Róchez 53'; Reyes 81'	Report	Gay 72'

Estadio Olímpico Metropolitano, San Pedro Sula
Attendance: 67
Referee: Cristophel Stewart (Cayman Islands)

October 24, 2012
22:00

Seattle Sounders FC (United States)	3–1	(Honduras) Marathón
Ochoa 23'; Zakuani 27'; Estrada 76'	Report	Brown 37'

CenturyLink Field, Seattle
Attendance: 7,874
Referee: Ricardo Arellano (Mexico)

=== Group 5 ===
Team	Pld	W	D	L	GF	GA	GD	Pts	Qualification	LA	PRI	MET
(United States) Los Angeles Galaxy	4	3	1	0	12	4	+8	10	Advance to championship round		4–0	5–2
Puerto Rico Islanders	4	1	1	2	4	7	−3	4		0–0		3–0
(El Salvador) Isidro Metapán	4	1	0	3	7	12	−5	3		2–3	3–1	

August 1, 2012
22:00

Isidro Metapán (El Salvador)	3–1	Puerto Rico Islanders
Muñoz 51', 59', 88'	Report	Addlery 25'

Estadio Jorge Calero Suárez, Metapán
Attendance: 1,480
Referee: Raúl Castro (Honduras)

August 23, 2012
22:00

Los Angeles Galaxy (United States)	5–2	(El Salvador) Isidro Metapán
Alvarado 20' (o.g.); Keane 22'; Beckham 45+1'; Juninho 82', 90+3'	Report	Muñoz 17', 87' (pen.)

The Home Depot Center, Carson
Attendance: 10,574
Referee: José Alfredo Peñaloza (Mexico)

August 29, 2012
22:00

Los Angeles Galaxy (United States)	4–0	Puerto Rico Islanders
Meyer 7'; Villarreal 46'; McBean 80'; Stephens 82'	Report

The Home Depot Center, Carson
Attendance: 7,500
Referee: Jafeth Perea (Panama)

September 19, 2012
20:00

Puerto Rico Islanders	0–0	(United States) Los Angeles Galaxy
	Report

Juan Ramón Loubriel Stadium, Bayamón
Attendance: 2,905
Referee: Raymond Bogle (Jamaica)

September 27, 2012
20:00

Puerto Rico Islanders	3–0	(El Salvador) Isidro Metapán
Ramos 40', 79'; Richardson 90+5'	Report

Juan Ramón Loubriel Stadium, Bayamón
Attendance: 550
Referee: Courtney Campbell (Jamaica)

October 25, 2012
22:00

Isidro Metapán (El Salvador)	2–3	(United States) Los Angeles Galaxy
Suárez 55'; Muñoz 67'	Report	McBean 38', 62'; Stephens 79'

Estadio Jorge Calero Suárez, Metapán
Attendance: 1,318
Referee: Hugo Cruz (Costa Rica)

=== Group 6 ===
Team	Pld	W	D	L	GF	GA	GD	Pts	Qualification	UANL	ALA	EST
(Mexico) UANL	4	2	2	0	12	3	+9	8	Advance to championship round		5–0	4–0
(Costa Rica) Alajuelense	4	2	1	1	4	7	−3	7		2–2		1–0
(Nicaragua) Real Estelí	4	0	1	3	1	7	−6	1		1–1	0–1	

August 1, 2012
22:00

UANL (Mexico)	4–0	(Nicaragua) Real Estelí
Edno 35'; Navarro 42'; Guarch 80'; Rivas 90'	Report

Estadio Universitario, San Nicolás de los Garza
Attendance: 31,650
Referee: Paul Ward (Canada)

August 22, 2012
22:00

Alajuelense (Costa Rica)	2–2	(Mexico) UANL
Calvo 22'; Valle 90+1'	Report	Zamora 41'; Viniegra 58'

Estadio Alejandro Morera Soto, Alajuela
Attendance: 8,875
Referee: Elmer Bonilla (El Salvador)

August 28, 2012
22:00

Real Estelí (Nicaragua)	0–1	(Costa Rica) Alajuelense
	Report	Guevara 42'

Estadio Independencia, Estelí
Attendance: 2,200
Referee: Armando Castro (Honduras)

September 18, 2012
22:00

Real Estelí (Nicaragua)	1–1	(Mexico) UANL
Barrera 53'	Report	Espericueta 89'

Estadio Independencia, Estelí
Attendance: 875
Referee: Juan Guerra (Guatemala)

September 26, 2012
22:00

Alajuelense (Costa Rica)	1–0	(Nicaragua) Real Estelí
Sánchez 49' (pen.)	Report

Estadio Alejandro Morera Soto, Alajuela
Attendance: 6,162
Referee: Héctor Rodríguez (Honduras)

October 24, 2012
22:00

UANL (Mexico)	5–0	(Costa Rica) Alajuelense
Hernández 6'; Juninho 25'; Pulido 34', 46', 59'	Report

Estadio Universitario, San Nicolás de los Garza
Attendance: 30,872
Referee: Jafeth Perea (Panama)

=== Group 7 ===
Team	Pld	W	D	L	GF	GA	GD	Pts	Qualification	MON	MUN	CHO
(Mexico) Monterrey	4	4	0	0	15	0	+15	12	Advance to championship round		3–0	5–0
(Guatemala) Municipal	4	2	0	2	4	6	−2	6		0–1		2–1
(Panama) Chorrillo	4	0	0	4	2	15	−13	0		0–6	1–2	

July 31, 2012
20:00

Monterrey (Mexico)	5–0	(Panama) Chorrillo
Basanta 7'; Reyna 45', 78', 88'; Carreño 83'	Report

Estadio Tecnológico, Monterrey
Attendance: 15,260
Referee: Hugo Cruz (Costa Rica)

August 23, 2012
20:00

Chorrillo (Panama)	1–2	(Guatemala) Municipal
Ruiz 75'	Report	L. Rodríguez 70'; Arias 87'

Estadio Rommel Fernández, Panama City
Attendance: 575
Referee: Baldomero Toledo (United States)

August 29, 2012
22:00

Municipal (Guatemala)	0–1	(Mexico) Monterrey
	Report	Suazo 79'

Estadio Mateo Flores, Guatemala City
Attendance: 7,859
Referee: Joel Aguilar (El Salvador)

September 20, 2012
22:00

Municipal (Guatemala)	2–1	(Panama) Chorrillo
M. Rodríguez 23'; Leandrinho 81'	Report	Addles 2'

Estadio Mateo Flores, Guatemala City
Attendance: 2,000
Referee: Silviu Petrescu (Canada)

September 25, 2012
22:00

Monterrey (Mexico)	3–0	(Guatemala) Municipal
Carreño 13'; Solórzano 53' (o.g.); Cardozo 81'	Report

Estadio Tecnológico, Monterrey
Attendance: 24,721
Referee: José Pineda (Honduras)

October 23, 2012
22:00

Chorrillo (Panama)	0–6	(Mexico) Monterrey
	Report	Carreño 11'; Suazo 25', 50'; Corona 28'; Cardozo 58'; Madrigal 90+3'

Estadio Rommel Fernández, Panama City
Attendance: 130
Referee: William Anderson (Puerto Rico)

=== Group 8 ===
Team	Pld	W	D	L	GF	GA	GD	Pts	Qualification	XEL	GUA	WCO
(Guatemala) Xelajú	4	2	1	1	7	6	+1	7 (Note: Tiebreakers: Xelajú are ranked ahead of Guadalajara on head-to-head away goals.)	Advance to championship round		1–0	3–2
(Mexico) Guadalajara	4	2	1	1	7	3	+4	7		2–1		4–0
(Trinidad and Tobago) W Connection	4	0	2	2	5	10	−5	2		2–2	1–1	

Notes:

Tiebreaker
Team	Pld	W	D	L	GF	GA	GD	AG	Pts
(Guatemala) Xelajú	2	1	0	1	2	2	0	1	3
(Mexico) Guadalajara	2	1	0	1	2	2	0	0	3

August 2, 2012
20:00

W Connection (Trinidad and Tobago)	2–2	(Guatemala) Xelajú
Arcia 23'; Britto 33'	Report	Chinchilla 73', 88'

Manny Ramjohn Stadium, San Fernando
Attendance: 1,450
Referee: Marlon Mejía (El Salvador)

August 21, 2012
22:00

Xelajú (Guatemala)	1–0	(Mexico) Guadalajara
Chinchilla 67'	Report

Estadio Mario Camposeco, Quetzaltenango
Attendance: 4,733
Referee: Jeffrey Solís (Costa Rica)

August 29, 2012
20:00

Guadalajara (Mexico)	4–0	(Trinidad and Tobago) W Connection
Fabián 53', 68', 90+3'; Fierro 64'	Report

Estadio Omnilife, Zapopan
Attendance: 5,310
Referee: David Gantar (Canada)

September 18, 2012
22:00

Xelajú (Guatemala)	3–2	(Trinidad and Tobago) W Connection
Cupid 4' (o.g.); Silva 38'; Santiago 76'	Report	Britto 9'; Jones 50'

Estadio Mario Camposeco, Quetzaltenango
Attendance: 2,669
Referee: Rolando Vidal (Panama)

September 26, 2012
20:00

W Connection (Trinidad and Tobago)	1–1	(Mexico) Guadalajara
Leon 66'	Report	Torres 39'

Ato Boldon Stadium, Couva
Attendance: 233
Referee: David Rubalcaba (Cuba)

October 25, 2012
22:00

Guadalajara (Mexico)	2–1	(Guatemala) Xelajú
Sánchez 43'; Morales 65'	Report	Alemán 79'

Estadio Omnilife, Zapopan
Attendance: 7,736
Referee: Edvin Jurisevic (United States)
