= C.F. Monterrey in international football =

Mexican professional football club

- Club: C.F. Monterrey
- Most appearances: Humberto Suazo (42)
- Top scorer: Humberto Suazo (18)
- First entry: 1975 CONCACAF Champions' Cup
- Latest entry: 2025 Leagues Cup

Titles
- Cup Winners' Cup: 1: 1993
- Champions League: 5: 2010–11; 2011–12; 2012–13; 2019; 2021

Club de Fútbol Monterrey (popularly known as Rayados) is a Mexican professional football club based in Guadalupe, Nuevo León. The club has participated in a total of 26 international tournaments across CONCACAF, CONMEBOL, and FIFA.

At the international level, Monterrey has won a total of six international titles: the CONCACAF Champions Cup/League five times and the CONCACAF Cup Winners Cup once; It is notable for its three-time championship in the 2011, 2012, and 2013 editions of the top tournament organized by the confederation. Other clubs that have won three confederation titles are Real Madrid, Ajax, Bayern Munich, CA Independiente, Estudiantes de La Plata, Auckland City, and Cruz Azul.

Monterrey's history in international tournaments began in the 1975 CONCACAF Champions' Cup, where they qualified based on their league performance. They defeated the Canadian Serbian White Eagles FC in the first round via penalty shootout, before being eliminated by their own country's Atlético Español in the second round of the tournament. Since then, they have participated thirteen times in CONCACAF's top competition.

Is also the only Mexican or North American club to remain undefeated in international finals of its affiliated confederation's top tournament; and is one of only three clubs in the world to have won four or more consecutive finals, along with Auckland City (13) and Independiente (7).

At the FIFA Club World Cup, their best result was third place in the 2012 and 2019 editions.

== Overall record ==
Competition	Played	Won	Draw	Loss	GF	GA	GD	Win%
CONCACAF Champions Cup/League	85	53	20	12	165	70	+95	62.35
CONCACAF Cup Winners Cup*	7	5	1	1	20	7	+13	71.43
Copa Pre Libertadores*	6	3	1	2	13	9	+4	50.00
Copa Libertadores	12	3	4	5	15	17	−2	25.00
FIFA Club World Cup	16	7	4	5	31	21	+10	43.75
Leagues Cup	12	5	2	5	16	18	−2	41.67
Total	138	76	33	29	260	142	+118	55.07

(*) This competition is inactive.

== Head-to-head record ==
The following table shows C.F. Monterrey all-time North American and international record.

Positive record Neutral record Negative record

Country	Club	Pld	W	D	L	W %
(Argentina)	Club Atlético River Plate	1	0	1	0	0.00
(Brazil)	São Paulo FC	2	0	1	1	0.00
(Canada)	Forge FC	2	2	0	0	100.00
(Canada)	Serbian White Eagles FC	2	1	1	0	50.00
(Canada)	Vancouver Whitecaps FC	2	0	2	0	0.00
(Colombia)	Once Caldas	2	0	2	0	0.00
(Costa Rica)	Liga Deportiva Alajuelense	2	0	1	1	0.00
(Costa Rica)	C.S. Herediano	2	2	0	0	100.00
(Costa Rica)	Deportivo Saprissa	4	1	3	0	25.00
(Dominican Republic)	Atlético Pantoja	2	2	0	0	100.00
(Egypt)	Al Ahly SC	3	2	0	1	66.67
(El Salvador)	C.D. FAS	2	1	1	0	50.00
(El Salvador)	C.D. Luis Ángel Firpo	1	1	0	0	100.00
(Guatemala)	Comunicaciones FC	4	3	0	1	75.00
(Guatemala)	C.S.D. Municipal	4	3	1	0	75.00
(Guatemala)	C.S.D. Suchitepéquez	1	1	0	0	100.00
(Guatemala)	C.S.D. Xelajú MC	2	1	1	0	50.00
(Germany)	Borussia Dortmund	1	0	0	1	0.00
(Haiti)	Don Bosco FC	2	2	0	0	100.00
(Honduras)	C.D. Marathón	2	2	0	0	100.00
(Honduras)	C.D. Olimpia	2	1	1	0	50.00
(Honduras)	C.D. Petrotela	2	1	0	1	50.00
(Honduras)	Real C.D. España	1	0	1	0	0.00
(Italy)	Inter Milan	1	0	1	0	0.00
(Japan)	Kashiwa Reysol	1	0	1	0	0.00
(Japan)	Urawa Red Diamonds	1	1	0	0	100.00
(Morocco)	Raja CA	1	0	0	1	0.00
(Martinique)	US Robert	2	1	0	1	50.00
(Mexico)	Club América	3	1	1	1	33.33
(Mexico)	Atlético Español F.C.	2	0	1	1	0.00
(Mexico)	Cruz Azul	4	3	1	0	75.00
(Mexico)	Atlético Morelia	2	2	0	0	100.00
(Mexico)	Club Necaxa	2	1	1	0	50.00
(Mexico)	Pumas UNAM	2	1	1	0	50.00
(Mexico)	Santos Laguna	4	2	1	1	50.00
(Mexico)	Tigres UANL	3	2	1	0	66.67
(Mexico)	Deportivo Toluca F.C.	2	2	0	0	100.00
(Panama)	C.D. Árabe Unido	2	0	0	2	0.00
(Panama)	Chorrillo F.C.	2	2	0	0	100.00
(Paraguay)	Club Nacional	2	1	0	1	50.00
(Qatar)	Al Sadd SC	1	1	0	0	100.00
(Saudi Arabia)	Al Hilal SFC	1	0	1	0	0.00
(South Korea)	Ulsan HD FC	1	1	0	0	100.00
(Tunisia)	Espérance Sportive de Tunis	1	1	0	0	100.00
(United Arab Emirates)	Al Jazira Club	1	1	0	0	100.00
(United Kingdom) ( (England) )	Chelsea F.C.	1	0	0	1	0.00
(United Kingdom) ( (England) )	Liverpool F.C.	1	0	0	1	0.00
(United States)	Atlanta United FC	2	1	0	1	50.00
(United States)	Austin FC	1	0	0	1	0.00
(United States)	Columbus Crew	4	2	1	1	50.00
(United States)	FC Cincinnati	3	2	0	1	66.67
(United States)	Charlotte FC	1	0	0	1	0.00
(United States)	Inter Miami CF	2	2	0	0	100.00
(United States)	Los Angeles FC	1	1	0	0	100.00
(United States)	LA Galaxy	2	2	0	0	100.00
(United States)	Nashville SC	1	0	0	1	0.00
(United States)	New York Red Bulls	1	0	1	0	0.00
(United States)	Philadelphia Union	1	0	0	1	0.00
(United States)	Portland Timbers	1	1	0	0	100.00
(United States)	Real Salt Lake	3	2	1	0	66.67
(United States)	San Jose Oaks	2	2	0	0	100.00
(United States)	Seattle Sounders FC	5	4	0	1	80.00
(United States)	Sporting Kansas City	2	2	0	0	100.00
(United States)	St. Louis Kutis S.C.	2	2	0	0	100.00
(Uruguay)	C.A. Bella Vista	2	0	1	1	0.00
(Uruguay)	Club Nacional de Football	2	1	0	1	50.00
(Venezuela)	Estudiantes de Mérida F.C.	3	1	0	2	33.33
(Venezuela)	Unión Local Andina F.C.	2	1	0	1	50.00
