= Diego Valdés =

Diego Valdés or Valdez may refer to:

- Diego Valdés (athlete) (born 1983), Chilean Olympic sprinter
- Diego Valdés (Colombian footballer) (born 1981), Colombian football midfielder
- Diego Valdés (Chilean footballer) (born 1994), Chilean football midfielder
- Diego Valdez (Paraguayan footballer) (born 1993), or Mudo Valdez, Paraguayan football midfielder
