= Héctor Morales (footballer, born 1985) =

Mexican footballer

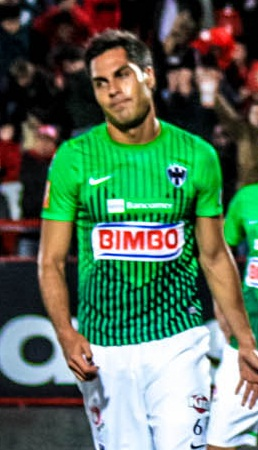
- Morales playing for Monterrey in 2012

Personal information
- Full name: Héctor Miguel Morales Llanas
- Date of birth: 3 May 1985 (age 41)
- Place of birth: San Nicolás de los Garza, Nuevo León, Mexico
- Height: 1.88 m (6 ft 2 in)
- Position: Defender

Youth career
- Monterrey

Senior career*
Years	Team	Apps	(Gls)
2004–2013	Monterrey	86	(4)
2004–2005	→ Cobras (loan)	33	(2)
2007–2008	→ Real Colima (loan)	25	(3)
2013–2014	→ Atlante (loan)	7	(1)
2014–2015	→ Lobos (loan)	21	(2)
2015–2016	→ Juárez (loan)	38	(0)
2016–2017	Cafetaleros	31	(0)
2017	UAT	8	(0)
- * Club domestic league appearances and goals as of 4 January 2017

Héctor Miguel Morales Llanas (Note: In this Spanish name, the first or paternal surname is Morales and the second or maternal family name is Llanas.) (born 3 May 1985) is a Mexican former professional footballer who played as a defender.

== Career ==
His first soccer club was the Club de Futbol Monterrey Reserves and had the fortune of becoming a champion in his first tournament as a player of the first team of "The Gang". He started his career on the Mexican circuit with Mexican second division team Cobras de Ciudad Juárez during the tournaments Apertura 2004–2005 and Clausura 2004–2005. He then returned to Club de Futbol Monterrey to play with the first team. His debut in the Mexican 1st Divicion was in a Monterrey against Atlante FC match on 26 August 2006. A year later, due to an injury, he was forced to leave the team and be part of Club de Futbol Real de Colima of the Mexican Second Division. After recovery and good performance, he was recalled by his team CF Monterrey in which a basis of commitment and good football, has been considered to be one of the most frequent players in Victor Manuel Vucetich team.

== Honours ==
Monterrey

- Mexican Primera División: Apertura 2009, Apertura 2010
- CONCACAF Champions League: 2010–11, 2011–12, 2012–13
