= 2007 Copa Panamericana =

Tournament details
- Host country: United States
- Dates: July 16 – July 22
- Teams: 6 (from 2 confederations)
- Venue: 1 (in 1 host city)

Final positions
- Champions: (Mexico) Cruz Azul (1st title)
- Runners-up: (Argentina) Boca Juniors

Tournament statistics
- Matches played: 7
- Goals scored: 15 (2.14 per match)
- Top scorer: (Mexico) Israel López (3 goals)

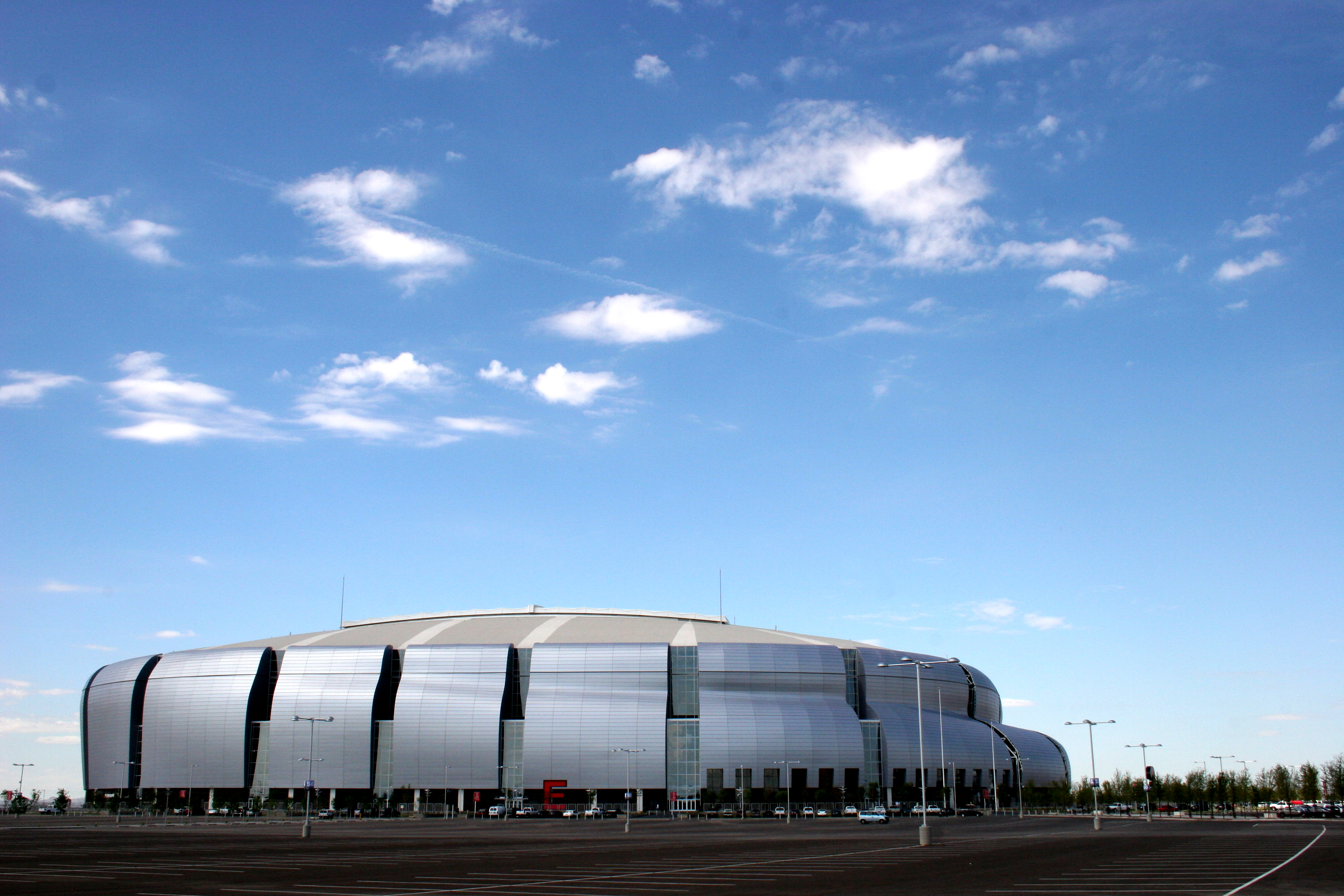
The University of Phoenix Stadium in Glendale, Arizona

The Copa Panamericana 2007 was a minor football club tournament organized by DIRECTV between July 16 and July 22 in the University of Phoenix Stadium in Glendale, Arizona, United States. The tournament was divided in two groups of three, who played each other once, with the top club in each group progressing to the final match. The champion, Cruz Azul, received $250,000.

== Competing clubs ==
- (Peru) Alianza Lima
- (Argentina) Boca Juniors
- (Venezuela) Caracas FC
- (Mexico) Club América
- (Mexico) Cruz Azul
- (Colombia) Deportivo Cali

== Venue ==
All seven matches were held at the University of Phoenix Stadium, with a total capacity of some 70,000 people.

== Groups ==
=== Group 1 ===
Team	Pts	Pld	W	D	L	GF	GA	GD
(Argentina) Boca Juniors	6	2	2	0	0	3	0	+3
(Mexico) América	3	2	1	0	1	2	1	+1
(Peru) Alianza Lima	0	2	0	0	2	0	4	-4

July 16, 2007

Boca Juniors	2-0	Alianza Lima
Boselli 39'; Dátolo 43'

University of Phoenix Stadium
July 18, 2007

América	2-0	Alianza Lima
Insúa 49' 51'

University of Phoenix Stadium
July 20, 2007

Boca Juniors	1-0	América
Palermo 07'

University of Phoenix Stadium

=== Group 2 ===
Team	Pts	Pld	W	D	L	GF	GA	GD
(Mexico) Cruz Azul	4	2	1	1	0	3	2	+1
(Colombia) Deportivo Cali	4	2	1	1	0	1	0	+1
(Venezuela) Caracas FC	0	2	0	0	2	2	4	-2

July 16, 2007

Cruz Azul	0-0	Deportivo Cali

University of Phoenix Stadium
July 18, 2007

Caracas FC	2-3	Cruz Azul
Vielma 76'; Ever Espinoza 82'		López 25'; Miguel Sabah 68' 79'

University of Phoenix Stadium
July 20, 2007

Caracas FC	0-1	Deportivo Cali
		Valdés 01'

University of Phoenix Stadium

=== Final ===
July 22, 2007

Boca Juniors	1-3	Cruz Azul
Boselli 24'		López 45' 84'; Delgado 73'

University of Phoenix Stadium

=== Champion ===
Copa Panamericana 2007 Winners
(Mexico)
Cruz Azul
First title

== Goalscorers ==
3 Goals

- (Mexico) Israel López ( (Mexico) Cruz Azul)

2 Goals

- (Argentina) Federico Insúa ( (Mexico) América)
- (Mexico) Miguel Sabah ( (Mexico) Cruz Azul)
- (Argentina) Mauro Boselli ( (Argentina) Boca Juniors)

1 Goal

- (Venezuela) Ever Espinoza ( (Venezuela) Caracas)
- (Venezuela) Leonel Vielma ( (Venezuela) Caracas)
- (Argentina) Martín Palermo ( (Argentina) Boca Juniors)
- (Argentina) Jesús Dátolo ( (Argentina) Boca Juniors)
- (Colombia) Diego Valdéz ( (Colombia) Deportivo Cali)
- (Argentina) César Delgado ( (Mexico) Cruz Azul)

== Statistics ==
Team	Pts	Pld	W	D	L	GF	GA	GD	Eff
(Mexico) Cruz Azul	7	3	2	1	0	6	3	+3	77.7%
(Argentina) Boca Juniors	6	3	2	0	1	4	3	+1	66.6%
(Colombia) Deportivo Cali	4	2	1	1	0	1	0	+1	66.6%
(Mexico) Club América	3	2	1	0	1	2	1	+1	50.0%
(Venezuela) Caracas FC	0	2	0	0	2	2	4	-2	0.0%
(Peru) Alianza Lima	0	2	0	0	2	0	4	-4	0.0%
