= 2012–13 CONCACAF Champions League championship stage =

The championship stage of the 2012–13 CONCACAF Champions League was played from March 5 to May 1, 2013. A total of eight teams competed in the championship stage.

== Qualified teams ==
The winners of each of the eight groups in the group stage qualified for the championship stage.

Group	Winners
1	(Mexico) Santos Laguna
2	(Costa Rica) Herediano
3	(United States) Houston Dynamo
4	(United States) Seattle Sounders FC
5	(United States) Los Angeles Galaxy
6	(Mexico) UANL
7	(Mexico) Monterrey
8	(Guatemala) Xelajú

== Seeding ==
The qualified teams were seeded 1–8 in the championship stage according to their results in the group stage.

Seed	Team	Pld	W	D	L	GF	GA	GD	Pts
1	(Mexico) Monterrey	4	4	0	0	15	0	+15	12
2	(Mexico) Santos Laguna	4	4	0	0	13	1	+12	12
3	(United States) Seattle Sounders FC	4	4	0	0	12	5	+7	12
4	(United States) Los Angeles Galaxy	4	3	1	0	12	4	+8	10
5	(Costa Rica) Herediano	4	3	1	0	4	1	+3	10
6	(Mexico) UANL	4	2	2	0	12	3	+9	8
7	(United States) Houston Dynamo	4	2	2	0	9	3	+6	8
8	(Guatemala) Xelajú	4	2	1	1	7	6	+1	7

Rules for classification: 1. Points; 2. Goal difference; 3. Goals scored; 4. Away goals scored; 5. Wins; 6. Away wins; 7. Drawing of lots.

== Format ==
In the championship stage, the eight teams played a single-elimination tournament. Each tie was played on a home-and-away two-legged basis. The away goals rule was used if the aggregate score was level after normal time of the second leg, but not after extra time, and so a tie was decided by penalty shoot-out if the aggregate score was level after extra time of the second leg.

== Bracket ==
The bracket of the championship stage was determined by the seeding as follows:

- Quarterfinals: Seed 1 vs. Seed 8 (QF1), Seed 2 vs. Seed 7 (QF2), Seed 3 vs. Seed 6 (QF3), Seed 4 vs. Seed 5 (QF4), with seeds 1–4 hosting the second leg
- Semifinals: Winner QF1 vs. Winner QF4 (SF1), Winner QF2 vs. Winner QF3 (SF2), with winners QF1 and QF2 hosting the second leg
- Finals: Winner SF1 vs. Winner SF2, with winner SF1 hosting the second leg

Quarterfinals
6	(Mexico) UANL	1	1	2
3	(United States) Seattle Sounders FC	0	3	3
7	(United States) Houston Dynamo	1	0	1
2	(Mexico) Santos Laguna	0	3	3
5	(Costa Rica) Herediano	0	1	1
4	(United States) Los Angeles Galaxy	0	4	4
8	(Guatemala) Xelajú	1	1	2
1	(Mexico) Monterrey	3	1	4

Semifinals
3	(United States) Seattle Sounders FC	0	1	1
2	(Mexico) Santos Laguna	1	1	2
4	(United States) Los Angeles Galaxy	1	0	1
1	(Mexico) Monterrey	2	1	3

Finals
2	(Mexico) Santos Laguna	0	2	2
1	(Mexico) Monterrey	0	4	4

== Quarterfinals ==
The first legs were played on March 5–7, 2013, and the second legs were played on March 12–13, 2013.

First legs: All times U.S. Eastern Standard Time (UTC−5); Second legs: All times U.S. Eastern Daylight Time (UTC−4)

Team 1	Agg.	Team 2	1st leg	2nd leg
Xelajú (Guatemala)	2–4	(Mexico) Monterrey	1–3	1–1
Houston Dynamo (United States)	1–3	(Mexico) Santos Laguna	1–0	0–3
UANL (Mexico)	2–3	(United States) Seattle Sounders FC	1–0	1–3
Herediano (Costa Rica)	1–4	(United States) Los Angeles Galaxy	0–0	1–4

=== First leg ===
March 5, 2013
20:00

Houston Dynamo (United States)	1–0	(Mexico) Santos Laguna
Davis 89'	Report

BBVA Compass Stadium, Houston
Attendance: 17,454
Referee: Roberto Moreno (Panama)

March 6, 2013
20:00

Xelajú (Guatemala)	1–3	(Mexico) Monterrey
Estacuy 58'	Report	Mier 9'; De Nigris 43'; Corona 76'

Estadio Mario Camposeco, Quetzaltenango
Attendance: 4,553
Referee: Silviu Petrescu (Canada)

March 6, 2013
22:00

UANL (Mexico)	1–0	(United States) Seattle Sounders FC
Pulido 74'	Report

Estadio Universitario, San Nicolás de los Garza
Attendance: 32,810
Referee: Jeffrey Solís (Costa Rica)

March 7, 2013
20:00

Herediano (Costa Rica)	0–0	(United States) Los Angeles Galaxy
	Report

Estadio Eladio Rosabal Cordero, Heredia
Attendance: 4,314
Referee: Courtney Campbell (Jamaica)

=== Second leg ===
March 12, 2013
20:00

Monterrey (Mexico)	1–1	(Guatemala) Xelajú
Ayoví 64'	Report	Santiago 44'

Estadio Tecnológico, Monterrey
Attendance: 30,440
Referee: Marcos Brea (Cuba)

Monterrey won 4–2 on aggregate.

March 12, 2013
22:00

Seattle Sounders FC (United States)	3–1	(Mexico) UANL
Yedlin 53'; Traoré 60'; Johnson 75'	Report	Hernández 23'

CenturyLink Field, Seattle
Attendance: 20,520
Referee: Elmer Bonilla (El Salvador)

Seattle Sounders FC won 3–2 on aggregate.

March 13, 2013
20:00

Santos Laguna (Mexico)	3–0	(United States) Houston Dynamo
Rodríguez 23'; Gomez 28'; Crosas 76'	Report

Estadio Corona, Torreón
Attendance: 27,563
Referee: Enrico Wijngaarde (Suriname)

Santos Laguna won 3–1 on aggregate.

March 13, 2013
22:00

Los Angeles Galaxy (United States)	4–1	(Costa Rica) Herediano
Gonzalez 18'; Villarreal 69'; Keane 83'; McBean 90+3'	Report	Aguilar 85'

The Home Depot Center, Carson
Attendance: 8,284
Referee: Walter López (Guatemala)

Los Angeles Galaxy won 4–1 on aggregate.

== Semifinals ==
The first legs were played on April 2–3, 2013, and the second legs were played on April 9–10, 2013.

All times U.S. Eastern Daylight Time (UTC−4)

Team 1	Agg.	Team 2	1st leg	2nd leg
Los Angeles Galaxy (United States)	1–3	(Mexico) Monterrey	1–2	0–1
Seattle Sounders FC (United States)	1–2	(Mexico) Santos Laguna	0–1	1–1

=== First leg ===
April 2, 2013
22:00

Seattle Sounders FC (United States)	0–1	(Mexico) Santos Laguna
	Report	Gomez 54'

CenturyLink Field, Seattle
Attendance: 21,057
Referee: Héctor Rodríguez (Honduras)

April 3, 2013
22:00

Los Angeles Galaxy (United States)	1–2	(Mexico) Monterrey
DeLaGarza 28'	Report	Suazo 82'; De Nigris 90'

The Home Depot Center, Carson
Attendance: 21,745
Referee: Hugo Cruz (Costa Rica)

=== Second leg ===
April 9, 2013
20:00

Santos Laguna (Mexico)	1–1	(United States) Seattle Sounders FC
Quintero 21'	Report	Neagle 73'

Estadio Corona, Torreón
Attendance: 19,595
Referee: Joel Aguilar (El Salvador)

Santos Laguna won 2–1 on aggregate.

April 10, 2013
22:00

Monterrey (Mexico)	1–0	(United States) Los Angeles Galaxy
De Nigris 81'	Report

Estadio Tecnológico, Monterrey
Attendance: 32,234
Referee: Roberto Moreno (Panama)

Monterrey won 3–1 on aggregate.

== Finals ==
The first leg was played on April 24, 2013, and the second leg was played on May 1, 2013.

All times U.S. Eastern Daylight Time (UTC−4)

Team 1	Agg.	Team 2	1st leg	2nd leg
Santos Laguna (Mexico)	2–4	(Mexico) Monterrey	0–0	2–4

=== First leg ===
April 24, 2013
22:00

Santos Laguna (Mexico)	0–0	(Mexico) Monterrey
	Report

Estadio Corona, Torreón
Attendance: 21,401
Referee: Roberto García (Mexico)

=== Second leg ===
May 1, 2013
22:00

Monterrey (Mexico)	4–2	(Mexico) Santos Laguna
De Nigris 60', 87'; Cardozo 84'; Suazo 90+1'	Report	Quintero 38'; Baloy 50'

Estadio Tecnológico, Monterrey
Attendance: 33,667
Referee: Marco Rodríguez (Mexico)

Monterrey won 4–2 on aggregate.
