= Dárvin Chávez =

Mexican footballer (born 1989)

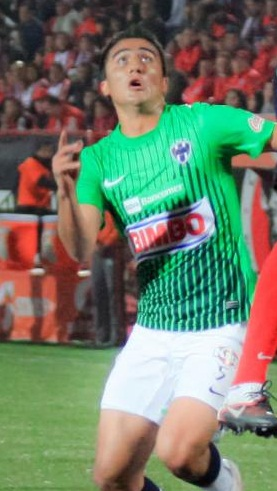
- Chávez with Monterrey in 2012

Personal information
- Full name: Dárvin Francisco Chávez Ramírez
- Date of birth: 21 November 1989 (age 36)
- Place of birth: Zapopan, Jalisco, Mexico
- Height: 1.77 m (5 ft 10 in)
- Position: Left-back

Youth career
- 2007–2008: Atlas

Senior career*
Years	Team	Apps	(Gls)
2007–2009	Académicos	24	(0)
2008–2011	Atlas	61	(0)
2011–2015	Monterrey	79	(1)
2015–2016	→ Veracruz (loan)	7	(0)
2016–2017	Veracruz	0	(0)
2018–2019	FF Jaro	46	(6)
2020	SJK	4	(0)
2020	SJK Akatemia	3	(0)
Total		209	(1)

International career
2011–2012	Mexico U23	31	(0)
2011	Mexico	3	(0)
Medal record
Men's football
Representing Mexico
Olympic Games
Gold medal – first place	2012 London	Team
Olympic Qualifying Championship
Winner	2012 United States
Toulon Tournament
Winner	2012 France	Team
- * Club domestic league appearances and goals

Dárvin Francisco Chávez Ramírez (born 21 November 1989) is a Mexican former professional footballer who played as a left-back. He is an Olympic gold medalist.

== Club career ==
He started his career at Atlas, starting out playing for their second team, Académicos de Atlas, in the Ascenso MX before making his debut for the first team on 11 October 2008 against Monterrey, in a game that ended 0–0. In total he made 61 Primera appearances for Atlas. On 4 April 2018, Chávez joined Finnish second tier side FF Jaro on a deal until the end of the 2018 season. On 13 January 2020, Chávez joined Veikkausliiga club SJK Seinäjoki on a one-year deal. He left the club on 13 November 2020.

== Honours ==
Monterrey

- CONCACAF Champions League: 2010–11, 2011–12, 2012–13

Veracruz

- Copa MX: Clausura 2016

Mexico Youth

- Pan American Games: 2011
- CONCACAF Olympic Qualifying Championship: 2012
- Olympic Gold Medal: 2012

== Career statistics ==
Statistics up to date as of 2012-13

Club	Season	Tournament	League		Playoffs		Continental^{[A]}		Other^{[B]}		Total	
Club	Season	Tournament	Apps	Goals	Apps	Goals	Apps	Goals	Apps	Goals	Apps	Goals
Atlas	2008–09 Primera División de México	Apertura 2008	6	0	–		–		–	–	6	0
Atlas	2008–09 Primera División de México	Clausura 2009	14	0	–		–		7^{[C]}	0^{[C]}	21	0
Atlas	2009–10 Primera División de México	Apertura 2009	14	0	–		–		–	–	14	0
Atlas	2009–10 Primera División de México	Bicentenario 2010	6	0	–		–		–		6	0
Atlas	2010–11 Primera División de México	Apertura 2010	6	0	–		–		–		6	0
Atlas	2010–11 Primera División de México	Clausura 2011	15	0	–		–		–		15	0
Atlas	Total		61	0	–	–	–	–	7	0	68	0
Monterrey	2011–12 Primera División de México	Apertura 2011	10	0	–		8	0	2	0	17	0
Monterrey	2011–12 Primera División de México	Clausura 2012	13	1	6	0	8	0	0	0	22	1
Monterrey	2012–13 Liga MX	Apertura 2012	11	0	2	0	7	0	?	0	?	?
Monterrey	2012–13 Liga MX	Clausura 2013	15	0	3	0	7	0	3	0	?	?
Monterrey	Total		23	1	6	0	8	0	2	0	39	1
Career totals			84	1	6	0	8	0	9	0	107	1

=== International ===
As of match played 12 July 2011

National team	Year	Apps	Goals
Mexico	2011	3	0
Total		3	0

== Notes ==
^A Continental statistics are for CONCACAF Champions League
^B Other statistics in 2008–09 include games played in 2009 InterLiga and 2009 North American SuperLiga; in 2011–12 they relate to 2011 FIFA Club World Cup
^C Interliga stats (4/0) have been sourced from the match line-ups at Soccerway: group games and final stage game v Pachuca;North American SuperLiga stats (3/0) are sourced from match line-ups at ESPN
