= Édgar Solís =

Mexican footballer (born 1987)

Personal information
- Full name: Édgar Iván Solís Castillón
- Date of birth: 5 March 1987 (age 39)
- Place of birth: Tepatitlán, Mexico
- Height: 1.73 m (5 ft 8 in)
- Position: Left-back

Youth career
- Guadalajara

Senior career*
Years	Team	Apps	(Gls)
2005–2014	Guadalajara	93	(4)
2007	→ Querétaro (loan)	6	(0)
2010–2011	→ Atlante (loan)	21	(0)
2012	→ Estudiantes Tecos (loan)	15	(0)
2012–2013	→ Monterrey (loan)	22	(0)
2015	→ Tigres UANL (loan)	4	(0)
2015	Herediano	6	(0)
2016	Celaya	0	(0)
2017	Real Burgos	5	(2)
2018–2019	Potros UAEM	24	(2)
2019–2020	Real Estelí		
2020	Once Deportivo	7	(0)
2020	Lobos Zacatepec	0	(0)
2021	Once Deportivo	14	(2)
2021	Halcones de Querétaro	5	(0)
2025	Tlaxcala	10	(0)
- * Club domestic league appearances and goals as of 16 March 2021

Édgar Iván Solís Castillón (Note: In this Spanish name, the first or paternal surname is Solís and the second or maternal family name is Castillón.) (born 5 March 1987) is a Mexican professional footballer who plays as a left-back.

== Club career ==
He made his debut on August 28, 2005, against Santos Laguna. A game which resulted in a 3–0 victory for Santos over Chivas. He has scored 3 goals in his whole career with Chivas. He has scored one international goal against San Jose from Bolivia in the Copa Santander Libertadores which ended in a 2–0 victory. For the 2010–11 season, Solís was sent out on loan at Atlante F.C. He was used for most of the season, but didn't really make an impact with the team. In July 2011, he returned from his loan. He did not make his return debut for the team because of an injury. In June 2012, he was loaned to Monterrey for the season. He returned to Chivas on May 28, 2013.

== Honours ==
Guadalajara

- Primera División de México: Apertura 2006

Monterrey

- CONCACAF Champions League: 2012–13
