= Mario Cárdenas =

Mexican footballer (born 1993)

Personal information
- Full name: Mario Alberto Cárdenas Virrey
- Date of birth: 23 August 1993 (age 33)
- Place of birth: Guaymas, Sonora, Mexico
- Height: 1.75 m (5 ft 9 in)
- Position: Forward

Youth career
- Santos Laguna

Senior career*
Years	Team	Apps	(Gls)
2012–2014	Santos Laguna	13	(0)
2014	→ Calor de Gómez Palacio	10	(3)
2014	Pioneros de Cancún	3	(0)
2015	Cimarrones de Sonora	9	(3)
2016	Albinegros de Orizaba	13	(4)
2016–2018	Reboceros de La Piedad	52	(11)
- * Club domestic league appearances and goals

Mario Alberto Cárdenas Virrey (born 23 August 1993) is a Mexican professional football player who last played for Reboceros de La Piedad.

== Career ==
Cárdenas grew up playing baseball as a child, as was common in his hometown of Guaymas, but he began playing football at the age of 12. He was discovered by Santos Laguna scouts while playing in a national tournament, and immediately joined their youth ranks. In a span of two years, Cárdenas progressed from the under-17 squad to the senior team. He made his professional debut for Santos on 19 August 2012, coming on for Darwin Quintero in a 2–1 league defeat to Pumas UNAM.

Cárdenas was loaned out to Calor de Gómez Palacio in January 2014. After parting ways with Santos Laguna, he joined Pioneros de Cancún for six months.

Cárdenas returned to his home state when he joined Cimarrones de Sonora in 2015. In his first game as a starter, he scored a hat-trick to secure a 3–1 win against Estudiantes Tecos.

He played with Acaxees de Durango of the Liga de Balompié Mexicano during the league's inaugural season in 2020–21.
