= Luis Rodríguez (Guatemalan footballer) =

Guatemalan footballer

Personal information
- Full name: Luis Ricardo Rodríguez Jérez
- Date of birth: 27 September 1982 (age 44)
- Place of birth: San Bernardino, Guatemala
- Height: 1.85 m (6 ft 1 in)
- Position: Defender

Team information
- Current team: Deportivo Mictlán
- Number: 30

Senior career*
Years	Team	Apps	(Gls)
2005–2007	Comunicaciones		
2006–2007	→ Club Xelajú MC (loan)		
2008–2009	Club Xelajú MC		
2009	CD Suchitepéquez		
2010	Club Xelajú MC		
- Deportivo Mictlán

International career^{‡}
2008–	Guatemala	11	(0)
- * Club domestic league appearances and goals as of 13 March 2010 ‡ National team caps and goals as of 13 March 2010

Luis Ricardo Rodríguez Jérez (born 27 September 1982) is a Guatemalan professional football defender who currently plays for Deportivo Mictlán in the Liga Nacional de Guatemala.

== Club career ==
Rodríguez was loaned to Club Xelajú MC by local giants Comunicaciones but did not want to leave Xelaju in 2007 while still being under contract at the Cremas since he felt he was not being valued highly by them. In January 2010, he rejoined Xelaju from CD Suchitepéquez.

== International career ==
Rodríguez made his debut for Guatemala in a May 2008 friendly match against El Salvador after being called up for the first time for the April 2008 game against Haiti. He had earned 11 caps at the start of February 2010, including 6 qualifying matches for the 2010 FIFA World Cup.
