= José María Basanta =

Argentine footballer

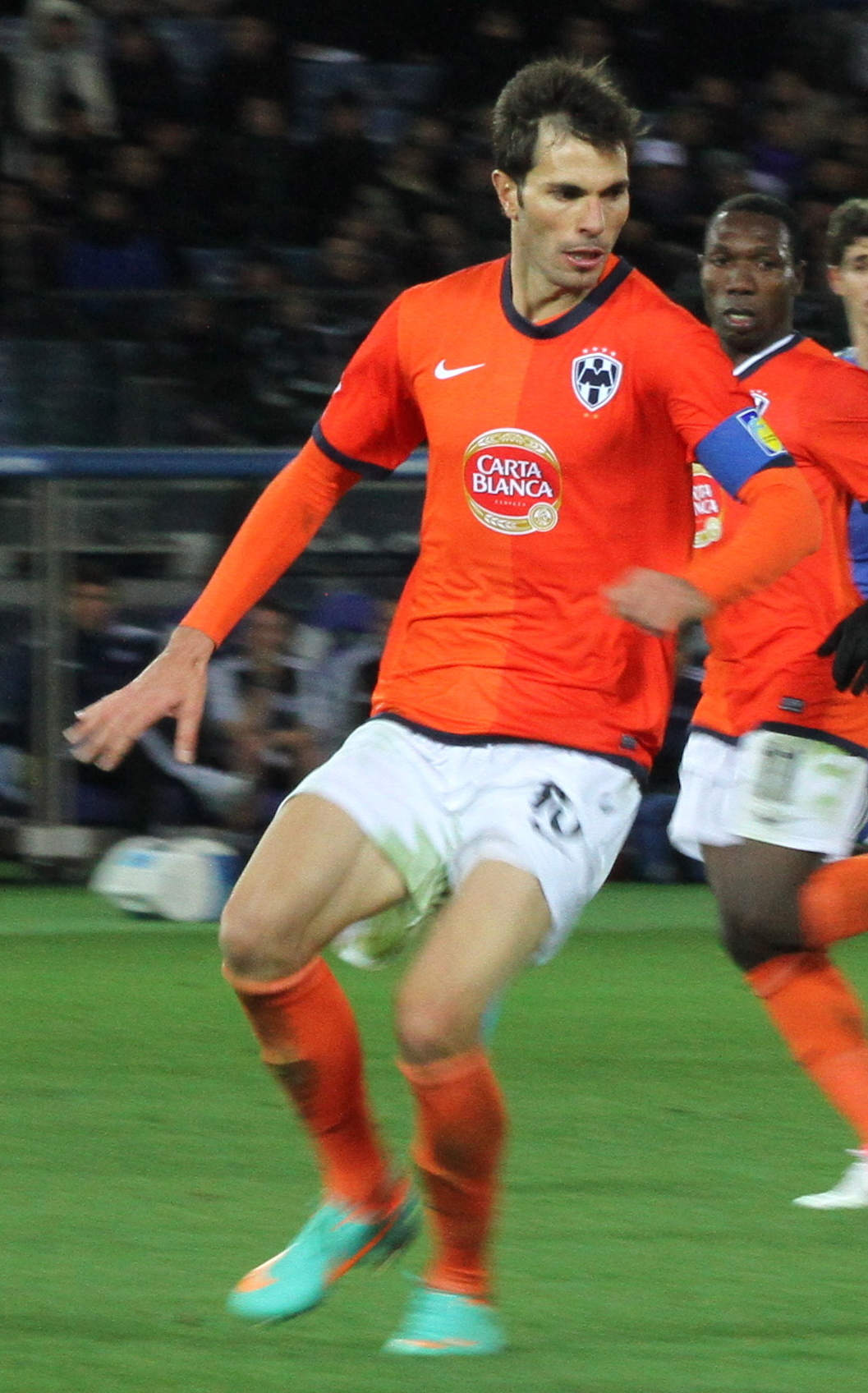
- Basanta playing for Monterrey in 2012

Personal information
- Full name: José María Basanta
- Date of birth: 3 April 1984 (age 42)
- Place of birth: Tres Sargentos, Argentina
- Height: 1.88 m (6 ft 2 in)
- Position: Centre-back

Senior career*
Years	Team	Apps	(Gls)
2003–2006	Estudiantes	11	(1)
2006–2007	Olimpo	32	(1)
2007–2008	Estudiantes	25	(1)
2008–2014	Monterrey	208	(7)
2014–2016	Fiorentina	24	(2)
2015–2016	→ Monterrey (loan)	34	(2)
2016–2020	Monterrey	87	(3)

International career^{‡}
2013–2014	Argentina	12	(0)
Medal record
Argentina
FIFA World Cup
Runner-up	2014 Brazil	Team
- * Club domestic league appearances and goals as of 14:03, 24 March 2020 (UTC) ‡ National team caps and goals as of 5 July 2014

José María Basanta (born 3 April 1984) is an Argentine former professional footballer who played as a centre-back. He also holds Mexican citizenship.

Basanta began his career with Estudiantes in his native Argentina. After a breakout performance in the 2008 Copa Libertadores, he signed for Monterrey, becoming an important part in their Liga MX and CONCACAF Champions League successes under coach Víctor Manuel Vucetich. After the 2014 FIFA World Cup, where Argentina finished runners-up, he joined Italian side ACF Fiorentina, but returned to Monterrey in the summer of 2015 and retired five years later.

== Career ==
Basanta started his career with Estudiantes in 2003 before joining Olimpo de Bahía Blanca of the Argentine 2nd Division in 2006. Basanta helped Olimpo to win both the Apertura and Clausura to secure automatic promotion to the Primera Division.

He rejoined Estudiantes in 2007 and stayed a year with them.

In June 2008, he was sold to Monterrey, by a request of the team's manager, Ricardo La Volpe. Since then, Basanta has been a regular in the first team, winning the 2009 Apertura championship and the 2010 Apertura championship.

On 31 August 2015, it was announced that Basanta would be returning to Rayados de Monterrey in a season-long loan deal.

On 5 September 2020, Basanta announced on his official Instagram that he will be retiring from professional football.

== Honours ==
=== Club ===
Olimpo

- Primera B Nacional (2): Apertura 2006, Clausura 2007

Monterrey

- Liga MX (3): Apertura 2009, Apertura 2010, Apertura 2019
- Copa MX (2): Apertura 2017, 2019–20
- CONCACAF Champions League (4): 2010–11, 2011–12, 2012–13, 2019

=== International ===
Argentina

- FIFA World Cup runner-up: 2014

=== Individual ===
- Best Center back of the tournament: Apertura 2010
- Best Center back of the tournament: Clausura 2012
