= Diego Valdés (Colombian footballer) =

Colombian footballer (born 1981)

Personal information
- Full name: Diego Fernando Valdés Parra
- Date of birth: 13 August 1981 (age 45)
- Place of birth: Cali, Colombia
- Height: 1.79 m (5 ft 10 in)
- Position: Midfielder

Youth career
- Deportivo Cali

Senior career*
Years	Team	Apps	(Gls)
2000–2002	Estudiantes de Mérida		
2002	Deportivo Cali		
2003–2005	Deportivo Pasto		
2005–2010	Deportivo Cali	97	(7)
2009	→ Medellín (loan)	5	(0)
2011–2012	Blooming	64	(6)
2013–2014	Atlético Venezuela	32	(3)
2014	Cúcuta Deportivo	13	(0)
2015	Atlético Venezuela	33	(0)
2015	Atlético	12	(0)

International career
2001	Colombia U-20	2	(0)
- * Club domestic league appearances and goals

Diego Fernando Valdés Parra (born August 13, 1981) is a retired Colombian footballer who played as a defender and central midfielder from 2000 until 2015. He has represented Colombia at under-21 and under-23 level. He currently plays for Depor F.C.

His former clubs at professional level include Deportivo Cali, Deportivo Pasto and Independiente Medellín in his native Colombia, Atlético Venezuela and Estudiantes de Mérida from Venezuela and Blooming of the Liga de Fútbol Profesional Boliviano. His younger brother is football defender Carlos Valdés, who plays for the Philadelphia Union in the MLS.
