= Gerardo Lugo (footballer, born 1984) =

Mexican footballer (born 1984)

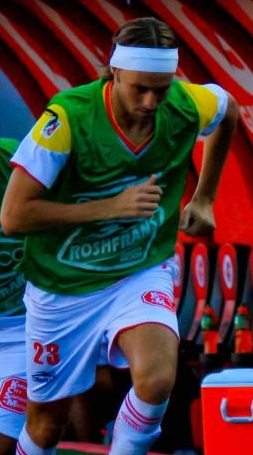
- Lugo playing for Morelia in 2011

Personal information
- Full name: Edgar Gerardo Lugo Aranda
- Date of birth: 31 December 1984 (age 41)
- Place of birth: Mexico City, Mexico
- Height: 1.82 m (6 ft 0 in)
- Position: Midfielder

Senior career*
Years	Team	Apps	(Gls)
2006–2012	Cruz Azul	85	(13)
2010–2011	→ Puebla (loan)	33	(5)
2011–2012	→ Morelia (loan)	39	(9)
2012–2013	→ Santos Laguna (loan)	25	(0)
2013–2018	Tigres UANL	63	(7)
2016	→ Veracruz (loan)	9	(0)
2017–2018	→ Querétaro (loan)	13	(1)
2018	Las Vegas	0	(0)
2018–2019	Herediano	37	(1)
Total		304	(36)

International career
2012	Mexico	4	(0)
- * Club domestic league appearances and goals

Edgar Gerardo Lugo Aranda (Note: In this Spanish name, the first or paternal surname is Lugo and the second or maternal family name is Aranda.) (born 31 December 1984) is a Mexican former professional footballer.

A creative midfielder, Lugo is usually deployed as an attacking midfielder but can also play as a winger or second striker. His key attributes are his ball control, vision and passing ability. Lugo is known for his ability to assist and score goals. Before joining Tigres, he played for Cruz Azul, Puebla, Morelia and Santos Laguna.

== Career ==
=== Clubs ===
He started his career with Cruz Azul Hidalgo and in 2006 he joined the first team Cruz Azul. On January 27, 2007, he made his official debut in the maximum circuit, the Primera División (First Division), now Liga MX, against Atlante F.C. in a 1–0 loss. He scored his first goal on October 14, 2007, at the Estadio Cuauhtémoc against Puebla FC.

In the Clausura 2008, under command of Sergio Markarián, Lugo had more opportunities to play. Cruz Azul was the runner-up of the Clausura 2008 tournament and Lugo scored four goals in that season. On 2010, he went on loan to Puebla. He scored for Puebla in their match against Atlante in the Apertura 2010. He also played for Puebla in their 2010 North American SuperLiga semi-final defeat to New England Revolution. He scored five goals with Puebla.

On 2011, he was transferred to Monarcas Morelia, on loan again from Cruz Azul. In Morelia, under the command of Tomás Boy, Lugo became a regular starter. In the 2012 draft held in Cancun, Quintana Roo, Lugo was sold to Santos Laguna. On 2013, Lugo was transferred to Tigres UANL, where under the command of the experienced coach Ricardo Ferretti, he has regained the good level he showed in Morelia.

In January 2018 Lugo trained with new United Soccer League side Las Vegas Lights FC.

=== National team ===
After gaining momentum in Morelia, Lugo was called to play with Mexico by head coach José Manuel de la Torre. Gerardo's debut with the national team came on February 29, 2012, in a friendly match against Colombia held in Miami.

== Personal ==
Lugo is married and has two children. His father Gerardo Lugo Gómez, was also a professional footballer who played as a midfielder.

== Honours ==
Cruz Azul

- Copa Panamericana: 2007

Tigres UANL

- Liga MX: Apertura 2015
- Copa MX: Clausura 2014

Veracruz

- Copa MX: Clausura 2016

Querétaro

- Copa MX: Apertura 2016
- Supercopa MX: 2017

Herediano

- Liga FPD: Apertura 2018
- CONCACAF League: 2018
