= Walter Ayoví =

Ecuadorian footballer (born 1979)

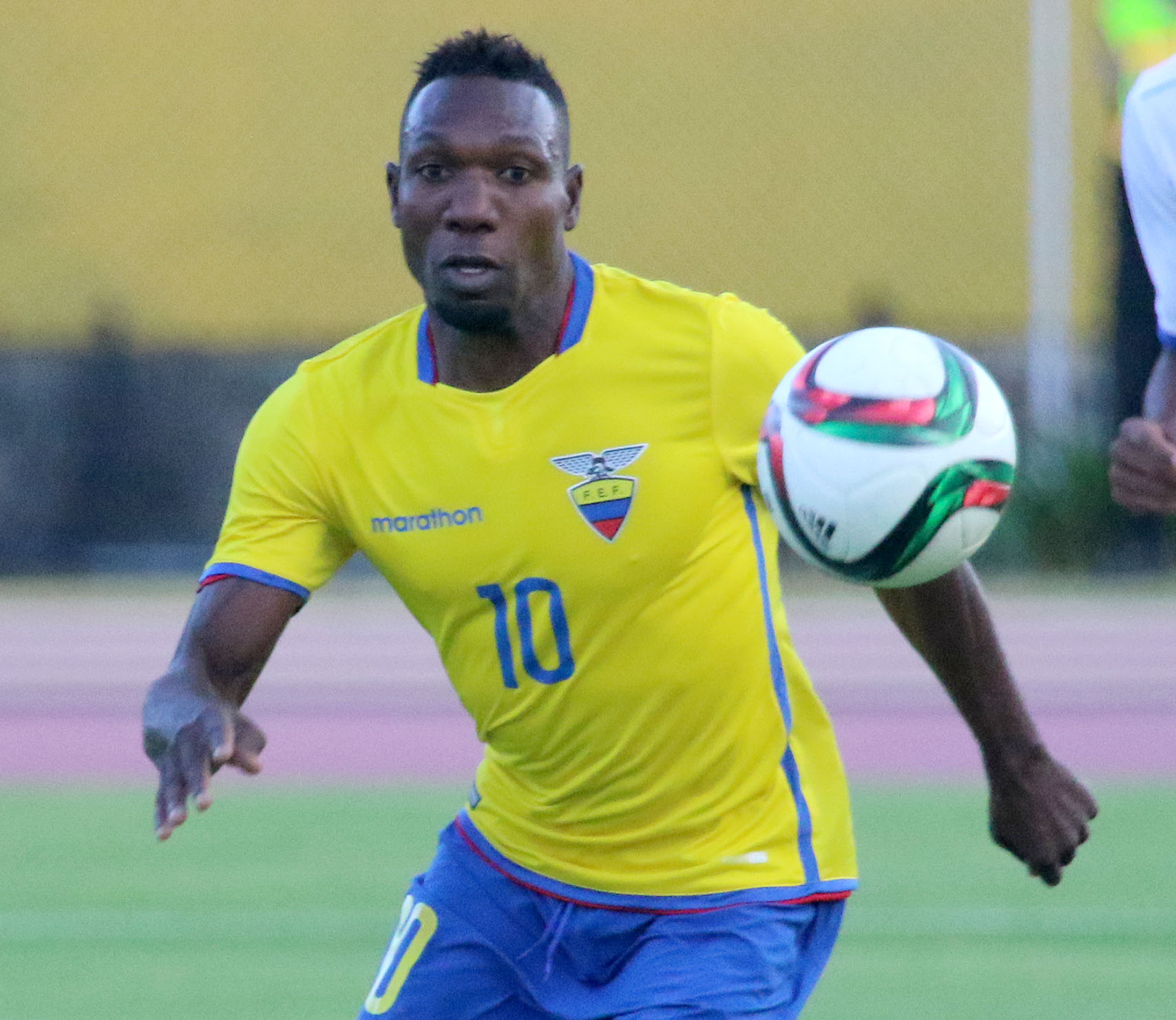
- Ayoví playing for Ecuador in 2015

Personal information
- Full name: Walter Orlando Ayoví Corozo
- Date of birth: 11 August 1979 (age 47)
- Place of birth: Esmeraldas, Ecuador
- Height: 1.71 m (5 ft 7 in)
- Positions: Left-back; left midfielder

Youth career
- 2000–2001: Rocafuerte
- Emelec

Senior career*
Years	Team	Apps	(Gls)
2000–2002	Emelec	87	(8)
2003–2005	Barcelona SC	102	(17)
2004–2005	→ Al Wasl (loan)	14	(7)
2006–2008	El Nacional	94	(12)
2009–2013	Monterrey	174	(13)
2013–2015	Pachuca	73	(4)
2015	Sinaloa	14	(1)
2016–2017	Monterrey	39	(1)
2017–2018	Guayaquil City	36	(2)
2022	Monterrey Flash (indoor)		
Total		633	(65)

International career
2001–2017	Ecuador	121	(8)
- * Club domestic league appearances and goals

Walter Orlando Ayoví Corozo (Spanish pronunciation: [ˈwalteɾ aˈʝoβi]; born 11 August 1979) is an Ecuadorian former professional footballer who played as a left-back or left midfielder. He made 121 appearances for the Ecuador national team, scoring 8 goals. He is the cousin of fellow footballer Jaime Ayoví, who also plays in the Ecuador national team. He also holds Mexican citizenship.

== Club career ==
=== Emelec ===
Ayoví was born in Camarones, Esmeraldas. He was transferred to Barcelona Sporting Club from Emelec on 23 January 2002, for an undisclosed amount. Despite links to several European club sides, including Mainz 05, for whom he played two friendly matches, and Arminia Bielefeld, both of the Bundesliga, Ayoví remained on Barcelona's squad until 2006.

=== El Nacional ===
When he was transferred to El Nacional. In between contracts he has also played for the Al Wasl Club in Dubai, the UAE.

=== Monterrey ===
On 7 January 2009 rumors said that Club de Futbol Monterrey were interested in signing him. He was loaned to CF Monterrey shortly after, then made his debut on 6 February 2009 scoring his first goal on the 4th Week match against Estudiantes Tecos.

On 29 March 2009 CF Monterrey took their option to purchase Ayoví after a spectacular game between Ecuador and Brazil. He renewed his Monterrey contract December 2011, with his future firmly set on the club.

=== Pachuca ===
On 15 July 2015, after two seasons with Pachuca, his former team came to terms and agreed to release Ayoví.

=== Dorados de Sinaloa ===
On 26 July 2015, it was confirmed that Ayoví had signed for newly ascended team, Dorados de Sinaloa, to join his compatriots Marcos Caicedo, Segundo Castillo, and Christian Suárez.

=== Return to Monterrey ===
On 9 December 2015, it was confirmed that Ayoví would be returning to the Rayados de Monterrey.

=== Monterrey Flash ===
In June 2022, Ayoví returned to professional football by signing with the Major Arena Soccer League's Monterrey Flash.

== International career ==
Ayoví was called up to the final squad for the 2002 FIFA World Cup held in Japan and South Korea. Being one of the youngest members in that Ecuador team, he did not make an appearance in that tournament. He was a regular in the Ecuador national team that qualified for the 2006 FIFA World Cup in Germany but this time, surprisingly, he was not included in the final World Cup squad.

He was, however, called up to participate in the 2007 Copa América and scored a free kick against Colombia in a pre-tournament friendly. His two appearances Copa América came as a substitute against Mexico and as a starter against Brazil.

Ayoví became an important fixture in the Ecuador side that is competing in the CONMEBOL 2010 World Cup qualifiers. He solidified his starting position with a double against neighbors Peru in a 5–1 victory. On 11 June 2009, he scored against Argentina, leading Ecuador to a 2–0 win.

During the CONMEBOL 2014 World Cup qualifiers, Ayoví played in all 16 of the qualifying games for Ecuador, helping the team to qualify for the tournament finals in Brazil. Ayoví went on to play in every minute of Ecuador's World Cup campaign, starting at left back in the team's three Group E matches.

On 31 March 2015, Ayoví was capped for the 100th time by Ecuador in a 2–1 friendly loss to Argentina in New Jersey. Later that year, he was included in Ecuador's squad for the 2015 Copa América and captained La Tri in the opening match of the tournament, a 2–0 loss to hosts Chile in Santiago.

== Career statistics ==
Scores and results list Ecuador's goal tally first, score column indicates score after each Ayoví goal.

List of international goals scored by Walter Ayoví
No.	Date	Venue	Opponent	Score	Result	Competition
1	6 June 2007	Estadio de La Condomina, Cartagena, Spain	Colombia	1–0	1–3	Friendly
2	21 November 2007	Estadio Olímpico Atahualpa, Quito, Ecuador	Peru	1–0	5–1	2010 FIFA World Cup qualification
3	21 November 2007	Estadio Olímpico Atahualpa, Quito, Ecuador	Peru	4–0	5–1	2010 FIFA World Cup qualification
4	26 March 2008	Estadio La Cocha, Latacunga, Ecuador	Haiti	2–1	3–1	Friendly
5	10 June 2009	Estadio Olímpico Atahualpa, Quito, Ecuador	Argentina	1–0	2–0	2010 FIFA World Cup qualification
6	17 November 2010	Estadio Olímpico Atahualpa, Quito, Ecuador	Venezuela	3–0	4–1	Friendly
7	17 November 2010	Estadio Olímpico Atahualpa, Quito, Ecuador	Venezuela	4–0	4–1	Friendly
8	29 May 2013	FAU Stadium, Boca Raton, United States	Germany	2–4	2–4	Friendly

== Honors ==
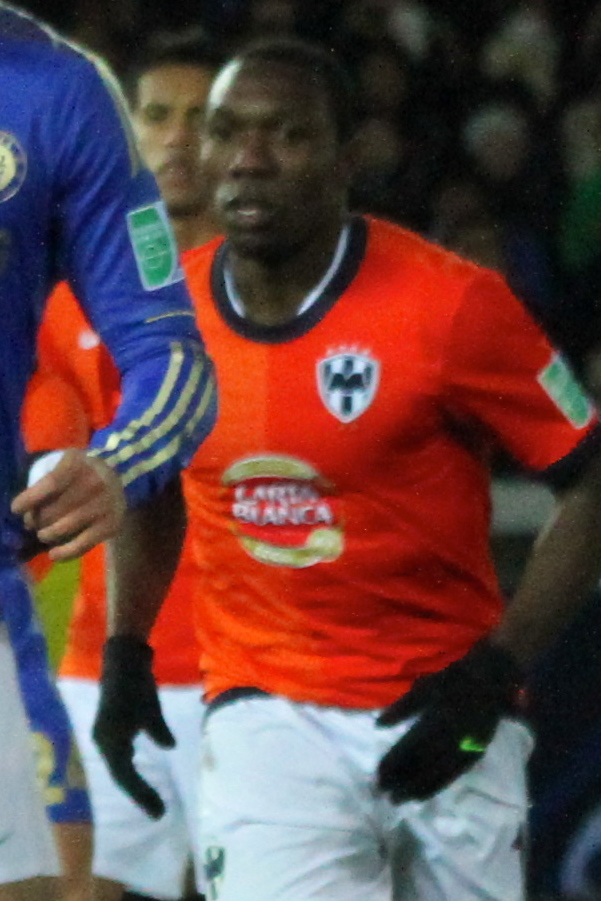
Ayoví at the 2012 FIFA Club World Cup for CF Monterrey

Emelec

- Ecuadorian Serie A: 2001, 2002

El Nacional

- Ecuadorian Serie A: 2006

Monterrey

- Mexican Primera Division: Apertura 2009, Apertura 2010
- CONCACAF Champions League: 2010–11, 2011–12, 2012–13

== See also ==
- List of men's footballers with 100 or more international caps
