= Neri Cardozo =

Argentine footballer (born 1986)

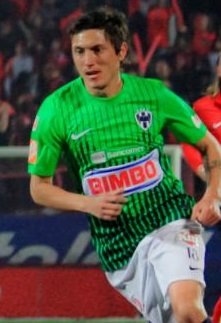
- Cardozo playing for Monterrey in 2012

Personal information
- Full name: Neri Raúl Cardozo
- Date of birth: 8 August 1986 (age 40)
- Place of birth: Mendoza, Argentina
- Height: 1.72 m (5 ft 8 in)
- Position: Midfielder

Youth career
- Godoy Cruz
- CSIR
- Newell's Old Boys
- Boca Juniors

Senior career*
Years	Team	Apps	(Gls)
2004–2009	Boca Juniors	135	(20)
2009	Chiapas	25	(1)
2010–2017	Monterrey	239	(30)
2016–2017	→ Querétaro (loan)	31	(4)
2018–2019	Racing Club	27	(0)
2019–2020	Defensa y Justicia	21	(1)
2020–2023	Venados	48	(2)

International career
2003	Argentina U17	5	(1)
2003–2005	Argentina U20	9	(1)
2007	Argentina	1	(0)
- * Club domestic league appearances and goals

Neri Raúl Cardozo (born 8 August 1986) is an Argentine former professional footballer who played as a midfielder. He was able to play on both sides of the field and was known for his ball control. He holds Mexican citizenship.

Cardozo made his debut for Boca Juniors in 2004 under coach Carlos Bianchi, he was a regular starter for the team for the next seasons, winning two Copa Sudamericana and the 2007 Copa Libertadores among other titles, in 2009 he moved to Mexico to play for Chiapas and in 2010 he moved was purchased by league champions Monterrey, he went on to win the Apertura 2010 tournament and three straight CONCACAF Champions League titles in 2011, 2012 and 2013 as well as a Copa MX title in his last game for the club.

Cardozo is one of the few players to win every continental title in America: the Copa Libertadores, Copa Sudamericana, Recopa Sudamericana and the CONCACAF Champions League.

== Club career ==
Cardozo was born in Mendoza, Argentina. He was signed to the Boca Juniors senior squad from the Youth Divisions of Boca Juniors at 17 years of age. His debut for Boca was in a 0–0 draw on 16 February 2004 against Gimnasia y Esgrima de La Plata.

Cardozo has contributed to the many achievements that Boca Juniors have accomplished since he signed for them, including a Copa Libertadores title, two Copa Sudamericana and Recopa Sudamericana titles, the Argentine Torneo de Apertura title of 2005 and the Torneo de Clausura title of 2006. He too was a part of the Boca squad which played in the 2007 FIFA Club World Cup in Japan; Cardozo scored in the semi-final 1–0 victory against Tunisian side Étoile Sportive du Sahel before losing 4–2 in the final against AC Milan.

On 27 March 2008, in a Copa Libertadores 4–3 win against Colo-Colo, Cardozo assisted Rodrigo Palacio in scoring Boca's third goal and then scored the fourth goal himself.

On 3 January 2009, he was announced as an official player for Chiapas, but got into legal problems when his former team Boca Juniors claimed that Cardozo left the team without consent.

On 28 December 2009, Cardozo was sent on loan (and later purchased by) CF Monterrey. On 16 February 2010, Cardozo made his debut with Monterrey and became a quick starter in their lineup; he led Monterrey to the quarter-finals in first place, going as far as the quarter-finals, losing to Pachuca. Cardozo has already been seen by many European teams because of his great speed, good shot power, and great passing skills.

== International career ==
Cardozo was a part of the Argentine squad that reached the semi-finals in the 2003 U-17 World Cup in Finland. Later that year, he was called up to play for the Argentina Under-20 squad. Neri Cardozo started his youth international career in 2003. Neri also played in the Argentina Under-20 in the 2003 FIFA World Youth Championship that reached the semi-finals. Two years later, Neri helped Argentina claim their fifth FIFA World Youth Championship; however, he missed the final due to suspension. Alfio Basile called up Cardozo for a friendly against Chile at senior level on 18 April 2007. Cardozo played 70 minutes of the match, and Alfio Basile also said that Neri Cardozo has big talent and could also be a star player for the Argentina national football team.

== Honours ==
Boca Juniors

- Argentine Primera División (3): 2005 Apertura, 2006 Clausura, 2008 Apertura
- Copa Libertadores (1): 2007
- Copa Sudamericana (2): 2004, 2005
- Recopa Sudamericana (2): 2006, 2008

Monterrey

- Liga MX (1): Apertura 2010
- Copa MX (1): Apertura 2017
- CONCACAF Champions League (3): 2010-11, 2011-12, 2012-13

Querétaro

- Copa MX (1): Apertura 2016

Racing Club

- Argentine Primera División (1): 2018–19

Argentina U20

- FIFA U-20 World Cup (1): 2005
