= 2012–13 CONCACAF Champions League =

48th edition of premier club football tournament organized by CONCACAF

Tournament details
- Dates: July 31, 2012 – May 1, 2013
- Teams: 24 (from 11 associations)

Final positions
- Champions: (Mexico) Monterrey (3rd title)
- Runners-up: (Mexico) Santos Laguna

Tournament statistics
- Matches played: 62
- Goals scored: 182 (2.94 per match)
- Attendance: 618,417 (9,974 per match)
- Top scorer(s): (Panama) Nicolás Muñoz (Colombia) Darwin Quintero (6 goals each)
- Best player: (Mexico) Aldo de Nigris
- Best goalkeeper: (Mexico) Oswaldo Sánchez

The 2012–13 CONCACAF Champions League was the 5th edition of the CONCACAF Champions League under its current name, and overall the 48th edition of the premier football club competition organized by CONCACAF, the regional governing body of North America, Central America and the Caribbean. It remained a 24-team tournament, but the format changed for this edition. CCL play began on July 31, 2012, and finished on May 1, 2013. The winner qualified as the CONCACAF representative for the 2013 FIFA Club World Cup.

Monterrey won their third consecutive title after defeating Santos Laguna in an all-Mexican final, and equaled Cruz Azul's feat of winning three consecutive CONCACAF club titles (1969–71), when the competition was known as the CONCACAF Champions' Cup.

== Qualification ==
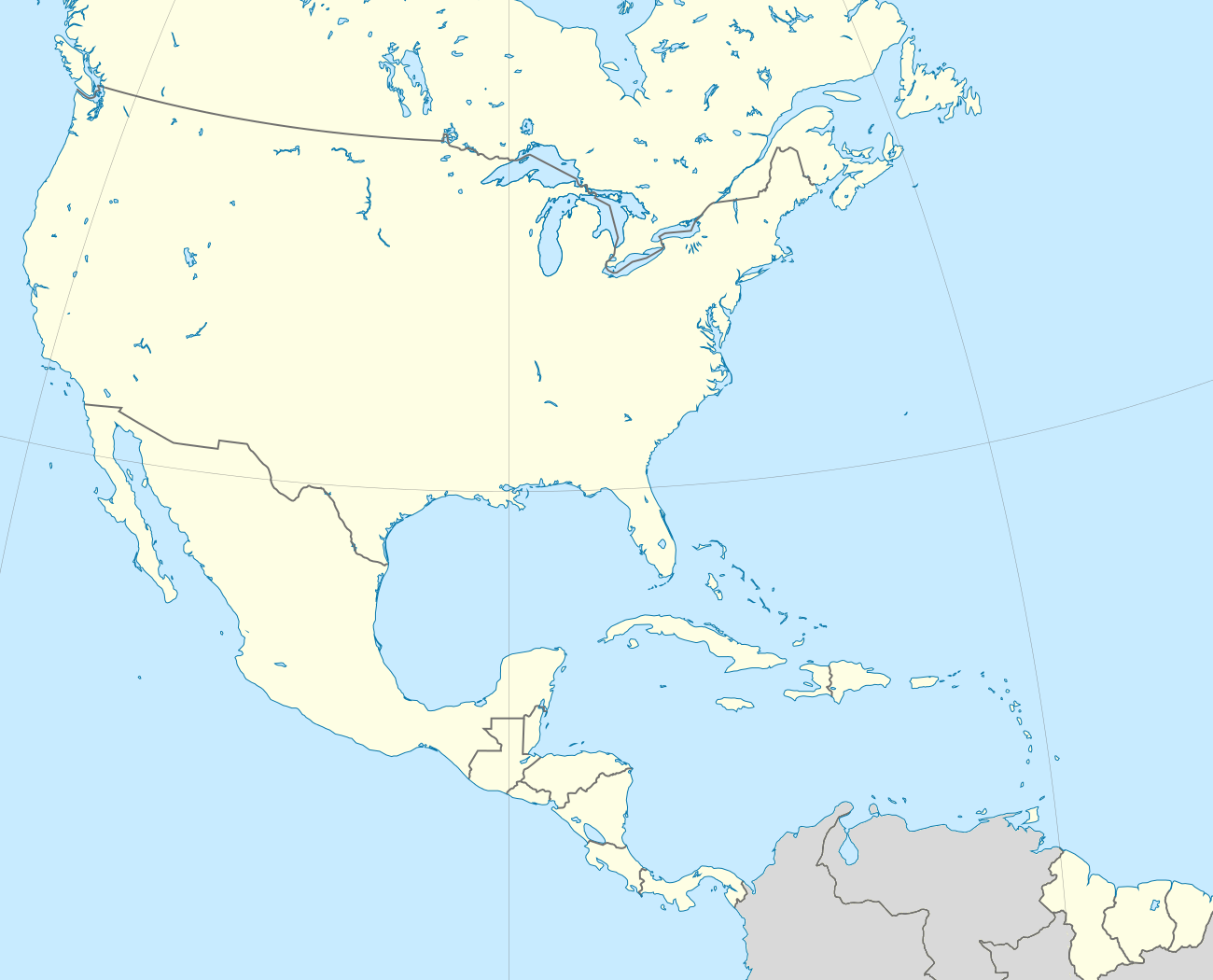
Location of teams of the 2013–14 CONCACAF Champions League
Brown: Group 1; Red: Group 2; Orange: Group 3; Yellow: Group 4;
Green: Group 5; Blue: Group 6; Purple: Group 7; Pink: Group 8.

Twenty-four teams participate in the 2012–13 CONCACAF Champions League from the North American, Central American, and Caribbean zones. Nine of the teams come from North America, twelve from Central America, and three from the Caribbean.

Teams may be disqualified and replaced by a team from a different country if the club does not have an available stadium that meets CONCACAF regulations for safety. If a club's own stadium fails to meet the set standards then it may find a suitable replacement stadium within its own country. However, if it is still determined that the club cannot provide the adequate facilities then it runs the risk of being replaced.

=== North America ===
A total of nine clubs from the North American Football Union participate in the Champions League. Mexico and the United States are allocated four spots, the most of any CONCACAF nation, while Canada is granted one spot in the tournament.

In Mexico, the winners of the Mexican Primera División Apertura and Clausura tournaments earn berths in Pot A of the tournament's group stage, while the Apertura and Clausura runners-up earn berths in Pot B.

For the United States, three of its four spots are allocated through the Major League Soccer (MLS) regular season and playoffs, while the fourth spot is allocated to whoever wins the domestic cup competition, the Lamar Hunt U.S. Open Cup. The winner of the Supporters' Shield and MLS Cup (if US-based) are placed in Pot A; the MLS Cup runner-up (if US-based) and the U.S. Open Cup winner are placed in Pot B.

The winner of Canada's domestic cup competition, the Canadian Championship, earns the lone Canadian berth into the tournament, in Pot B. Despite the inclusion of Canadian teams in MLS, they cannot qualify for the CONCACAF Champions League through MLS, and if a Canadian-based MLS team win the Supporters' Shield or play in the MLS Cup final, the Champions League place is allocated to the US-based team with the best MLS regular season record who has failed to otherwise qualify.

=== Central America ===
Twelve clubs from the Central American Football Union qualify to the Champions League. If one or more clubs is precluded, it is supplanted by a club from another Central American federation. The reallocation would be based on results from previous Champions League tournaments.

For the Central American representatives that qualify via split seasons, in nations that play a playoff to determine a national champion, the winner gains the nation's top spot. In nations that don't utilize such methods, total points over both seasons, followed by other tiebreakers, determine which team gains the nation's top spot. The pots of the teams are as follows:

- The top teams from the leagues of Costa Rica, Honduras, Guatemala and Panama are placed in Pot A.
- The top team from the league of El Salvador, and the second teams from the leagues of Costa Rica and Honduras are placed in Pot B.
- The second teams from the leagues of Guatemala, Panama and El Salvador, and the sole representatives from the leagues of Nicaragua and Belize are placed in Pot C.

=== Caribbean ===
Three berths in Pot C are allocated to the top three finishers of the CFU Club Championship, a subcontinental tournament for clubs from nations of the Caribbean Football Union. In order for a Caribbean club to qualify for the CFU Club Championship, they would need to finish as the champion (or in some cases, runner-up) in their respective nation's top league in the previous season.

If any Caribbean club is precluded, it is supplanted by the fourth-place finisher from the CFU Club Championship.

== Teams ==
The following teams qualified for the tournament.

Association	Team	Pot	Qualifying method	App^{*}	Last App^{*}	Previous Best^{*}
North America (9 teams)
(Mexico) Mexico; 4 berths	Tigres UANL	A	2011 Apertura champions	1st	N/A	N/A
(Mexico) Mexico; 4 berths	Santos Laguna	A	2012 Clausura champions and 2011 Apertura runners-up ^{Note MEX}	4th	2011–12	Runners-up
(Mexico) Mexico; 4 berths	Guadalajara	B	Non-finalist with best regular season record in 2011 Apertura ^{Note MEX}	1st	N/A	N/A
(Mexico) Mexico; 4 berths	Monterrey	B	2012 Clausura runners-up	3rd	2011–12	Champions (2)
(United States) United States; 4 berths	Los Angeles Galaxy	A	2011 MLS Cup and 2011 MLS Supporters' Shield champions ^{Note USA}	3rd	2011–12	Quarterfinals
(United States) United States; 4 berths	Seattle Sounders FC	A	2011 MLS Supporters' Shield runners-up ^{Note USA} 2011 U.S. Open Cup champions	3rd	2011–12	Quarterfinals
(United States) United States; 4 berths	Houston Dynamo	B	2011 MLS Cup runners-up	3rd	2009–10	Quarterfinals
(United States) United States; 4 berths	Real Salt Lake	B	2011 MLS Supporters' Shield third place ^{Note USA}	2nd	2010–11	Runners-up
(Canada) Canada; 1 berth	Toronto FC	B	2012 Canadian Championship champions	4th	2011–12	Semifinals
Central America (12 teams)
(El Salvador) El Salvador; 3 berths^{†}	Isidro Metapán	B	2011 Apertura champions	5th	2011–12	Quarterfinals
(El Salvador) El Salvador; 3 berths^{†}	Águila	C	2012 Clausura champions	1st	N/A	N/A
(El Salvador) El Salvador; 3 berths^{†}	FAS	C	Non-champions with best aggregate record in 2011–12 season	2nd	2010–11	Group stage
(Costa Rica) Costa Rica; 2 berths	Alajuelense	B	2011 Invierno champions	3rd	2011–12	Group stage
(Costa Rica) Costa Rica; 2 berths	Herediano	A	2012 Verano champions	3rd	2011–12	Group stage
(Honduras) Honduras; 2 berths	Olimpia	A	2011 Apertura and 2012 Clausura champions	5th	2011–12	Quarterfinals
(Honduras) Honduras; 2 berths	Marathón	B	Non-champions with best aggregate record in 2011–12 season	4th	2010–11	Quarterfinals
(Guatemala) Guatemala; 2 berths	Municipal	C	2011 Apertura champions	4th	2011–12	Group stage
(Guatemala) Guatemala; 2 berths	Xelajú	A	2012 Clausura champions	2nd	2010–11	Preliminary round
(Panama) Panama; 2 berths	Chorrillo	A	2011 Apertura champions	1st	N/A	N/A
(Panama) Panama; 2 berths	Tauro	C	2012 Clausura champions	4th	2011–12	Group stage
(Nicaragua) Nicaragua; 1 berth	Real Estelí	C	2011 Apertura and 2012 Clausura champions	3rd	2011–12	Preliminary round
Caribbean (3 teams)
Trinidad and Tobago	Caledonia AIA	C	2012 CFU Club Championship champions	1st	N/A	N/A
Trinidad and Tobago	W Connection	C	2012 CFU Club Championship runners-up	2nd	2009–10	Group stage
Puerto Rico	Puerto Rico Islanders	C	2012 CFU Club Championship third place	5th	2011–12	Semifinals

Notes

- ^{*} Number of appearances, last appearance, and previous best result count only those in the CONCACAF Champions League era starting from 2008–09 (not counting those in the era of the Champions' Cup from 1962 to 2008).
- ^{†} Because Belize does not have a stadium which meets CONCACAF'S minimum standards for the Champions League, the spot normally reserved for the champions of Belize was reallocated to El Salvador, since it was the only Central American nation to send a team to the 2011–12 CONCACAF Champions League quarterfinals.
- Mexico (MEX): Because Santos Laguna, the 2011 Apertura runners-up, also won the 2012 Clausura, they relinquished the spot allocated to the Apertura runners-up to Guadalajara, the team with the best regular season record in the Apertura, based on the formula outlined by the Mexican Football Federation.
- United States (USA): Because the Los Angeles Galaxy won both the 2011 MLS Supporters' Shield and the 2011 MLS Cup, Seattle Sounders FC, the 2011 MLS Supporters' Shield runners-up, was also placed in Pot A, and as they also won the 2011 U.S. Open Cup, a CCL berth became available and went to Real Salt Lake, the 2011 MLS Supporters' Shield third place.

== Format ==
On January 12, 2012, CONCACAF announced that the 2012–13 tournament would be played under a different format than previous editions, where the preliminary round is eliminated and all qualified teams enter the group stage. In the group stage, the 24 teams are drawn into eight groups of three, with each group containing one team from each of the three pots. The allocation of teams into pots are based on their national association and qualifying berth. Teams from the same association (excluding "wildcard" teams which replace a team from another association) cannot be drawn with each other in the group stage, and each group is guaranteed to contain a team from either the United States or Mexico, meaning U.S. and Mexican teams cannot play each other in the group stage. Each group is played on a home-and-away round-robin basis. The winners of each group advance to the championship stage.

In the championship stage, the eight teams play a single-elimination tournament. Each tie is played on a home-and-away two-legged basis. The away goals rule is used if the aggregate score is level after normal time of the second leg, but not after extra time, and so a tie is decided by penalty shoot-out if the aggregate score is level after extra time of the second leg. Unlike previous years where a second draw was conducted to set the pairings for the championship stage, the bracket is determined by the teams' record in the group stage. The quarterfinals match the team with the best record against the team with the worst record, while the second-best team faces the seventh-best, third against sixth and fourth against fifth. The top four teams play the second leg at home. In the semifinals, the winner of 1-vs-8 faces the winner of 4-vs-5, with the 1-vs-8 winner hosting the second leg, and likewise 2-vs-7 plays 3-vs-6, with the 2-vs-7 winner hosting the second leg. In the finals, the team that prevails out of the upper bracket of 1-8-4-5 hosts the second leg. This means that the higher-seeded team does not necessarily host the second leg in the semifinals and finals.

Pot A
(Mexico) Tigres UANL	(Mexico) Santos Laguna	(United States) Los Angeles Galaxy	(United States) Seattle Sounders FC
(Costa Rica) Herediano	(Honduras) Olimpia	(Guatemala) Xelajú	(Panama) Chorrillo
Pot B
(Mexico) Guadalajara	(Mexico) Monterrey	(United States) Houston Dynamo	(United States) Real Salt Lake
(Costa Rica) Alajuelense	(Honduras) Marathón	(El Salvador) Isidro Metapán	(Canada) Toronto FC
Pot C
(Guatemala) Municipal	(Panama) Tauro	(El Salvador) Águila	(Nicaragua) Real Estelí
(El Salvador) FAS	(Trinidad and Tobago) Caledonia AIA	(Trinidad and Tobago) W Connection	Puerto Rico Islanders

== Schedule ==
The schedule of the competition was as follows.

Round		Draw date	First leg	Second leg
Group stage	Matchday 1	June 5, 2012 (New York, United States)	July 31–August 2, 2012	
Group stage	Matchday 2	June 5, 2012 (New York, United States)	August 21–23, 2012	
Group stage	Matchday 3	June 5, 2012 (New York, United States)	August 28–30, 2012	
Group stage	Matchday 4	June 5, 2012 (New York, United States)	September 18–20, 2012	
Group stage	Matchday 5	June 5, 2012 (New York, United States)	September 25–27, 2012	
Group stage	Matchday 6	June 5, 2012 (New York, United States)	October 23–25, 2012	
Championship stage	Quarterfinals	June 5, 2012 (New York, United States)	March 5–7, 2013	March 12–13, 2013
Championship stage	Semifinals	June 5, 2012 (New York, United States)	April 2–3, 2013	April 9–10, 2013
Championship stage	Final	June 5, 2012 (New York, United States)	April 24, 2013	May 1, 2013

== Group stage ==
The draw for the group stage was held on June 5, 2012. The winners of each group advanced to the championship stage.

Tiebreakers

The teams are ranked according to points (3 points for a win, 1 point for a tie, 0 points for a loss). If tied on points, tiebreakers are applied in the following order:

1. Greater number of points earned in matches between the teams concerned
2. Greater goal difference in matches between the teams concerned
3. Greater number of goals scored away from home in matches between the teams concerned
4. Reapply first three criteria if two or more teams are still tied
5. Greater goal difference in all group matches
6. Greater number of goals scored in group matches
7. Greater number of goals scored away in all group matches
8. Drawing of lots

=== Group 1 ===
Team	Pld	W	D	L	GF	GA	GD	Pts	Qualification	SAN	TOR	ÁGU
(Mexico) Santos Laguna	4	4	0	0	13	1	+12	12	Advance to championship round		1–0	5–0
(Canada) Toronto FC	4	2	0	2	9	5	+4	6		1–3		5–1
(El Salvador) Águila	4	0	0	4	1	17	−16	0		0–4	0–3	

Legend: Blue = home team win; Yellow = draw; Red = away team win.

=== Group 2 ===
Team	Pld	W	D	L	GF	GA	GD	Pts	Qualification	HER	RSL	TAU
(Costa Rica) Herediano	4	3	1	0	4	1	+3	10	Advance to championship round		1–0	2–1
(United States) Real Salt Lake	4	2	1	1	3	1	+2	7		0–0		2–0
(Panama) Tauro	4	0	0	4	1	6	−5	0		0–1	0–1	

Legend: Blue = home team win; Yellow = draw; Red = away team win.

=== Group 3 ===
Team	Pld	W	D	L	GF	GA	GD	Pts	Qualification	HOU	OLI	FAS
(United States) Houston Dynamo	4	2	2	0	9	3	+6	8	Advance to championship round		1–1	4–0
(Honduras) Olimpia	4	1	2	1	6	4	+2	5		1–1		3–0
(El Salvador) FAS	4	1	0	3	3	11	−8	3		1–3	2–1	

Legend: Blue = home team win; Yellow = draw; Red = away team win.

=== Group 4 ===
Team	Pld	W	D	L	GF	GA	GD	Pts	Qualification	SEA	MAR	CAL
(United States) Seattle Sounders FC	4	4	0	0	12	5	+7	12	Advance to championship round		3–1	3–1
(Honduras) Marathón	4	1	1	2	5	7	−2	4		2–3		2–1
(Trinidad and Tobago) Caledonia AIA	4	0	1	3	3	8	−5	1		1–3	0–0	

Legend: Blue = home team win; Yellow = draw; Red = away team win.

=== Group 5 ===
Team	Pld	W	D	L	GF	GA	GD	Pts	Qualification	LA	PRI	MET
(United States) Los Angeles Galaxy	4	3	1	0	12	4	+8	10	Advance to championship round		4–0	5–2
Puerto Rico Islanders	4	1	1	2	4	7	−3	4		0–0		3–0
(El Salvador) Isidro Metapán	4	1	0	3	7	12	−5	3		2–3	3–1	

Legend: Blue = home team win; Yellow = draw; Red = away team win.

=== Group 6 ===
Team	Pld	W	D	L	GF	GA	GD	Pts	Qualification	UANL	ALA	EST
(Mexico) UANL	4	2	2	0	12	3	+9	8	Advance to championship round		5–0	4–0
(Costa Rica) Alajuelense	4	2	1	1	4	7	−3	7		2–2		1–0
(Nicaragua) Real Estelí	4	0	1	3	1	7	−6	1		1–1	0–1	

Legend: Blue = home team win; Yellow = draw; Red = away team win.

=== Group 7 ===
Team	Pld	W	D	L	GF	GA	GD	Pts	Qualification	MON	MUN	CHO
(Mexico) Monterrey	4	4	0	0	15	0	+15	12	Advance to championship round		3–0	5–0
(Guatemala) Municipal	4	2	0	2	4	6	−2	6		0–1		2–1
(Panama) Chorrillo	4	0	0	4	2	15	−13	0		0–6	1–2	

Legend: Blue = home team win; Yellow = draw; Red = away team win.

=== Group 8 ===
Team	Pld	W	D	L	GF	GA	GD	Pts	Qualification	XEL	GUA	WCO
(Guatemala) Xelajú	4	2	1	1	7	6	+1	7 (Note: Tiebreakers: Xelajú are ranked ahead of Guadalajara on head-to-head away goals.)	Advance to championship round		1–0	3–2
(Mexico) Guadalajara	4	2	1	1	7	3	+4	7		2–1		4–0
(Trinidad and Tobago) W Connection	4	0	2	2	5	10	−5	2		2–2	1–1	

Legend: Blue = home team win; Yellow = draw; Red = away team win.

== Championship stage ==
=== Seeding ===
The qualified teams were seeded 1–8 in the championship stage according to their results in the group stage.

Seed	Team	Pld	W	D	L	GF	GA	GD	Pts
1	(Mexico) Monterrey	4	4	0	0	15	0	+15	12
2	(Mexico) Santos Laguna	4	4	0	0	13	1	+12	12
3	(United States) Seattle Sounders FC	4	4	0	0	12	5	+7	12
4	(United States) Los Angeles Galaxy	4	3	1	0	12	4	+8	10
5	(Costa Rica) Herediano	4	3	1	0	4	1	+3	10
6	(Mexico) UANL	4	2	2	0	12	3	+9	8
7	(United States) Houston Dynamo	4	2	2	0	9	3	+6	8
8	(Guatemala) Xelajú	4	2	1	1	7	6	+1	7

Rules for classification: 1. Points; 2. Goal difference; 3. Goals scored; 4. Away goals scored; 5. Wins; 6. Away wins; 7. Drawing of lots.

=== Bracket ===
The bracket of the championship stage was determined by the seeding as follows:

- Quarterfinals: Seed 1 vs. Seed 8 (QF1), Seed 2 vs. Seed 7 (QF2), Seed 3 vs. Seed 6 (QF3), Seed 4 vs. Seed 5 (QF4), with seeds 1–4 hosting the second leg
- Semifinals: Winner QF1 vs. Winner QF4 (SF1), Winner QF2 vs. Winner QF3 (SF2), with winners QF1 and QF2 hosting the second leg
- Finals: Winner SF1 vs. Winner SF2, with winner SF1 hosting the second leg

Quarterfinals
6	(Mexico) Tigres UANL	1	1	2
3	(United States) Seattle Sounders FC	0	3	3
7	(United States) Houston Dynamo	1	0	1
2	(Mexico) Santos Laguna	0	3	3
5	(Costa Rica) Herediano	0	1	1
4	(United States) Los Angeles Galaxy	0	4	4
8	(Guatemala) Xelajú	1	1	2
1	(Mexico) Monterrey	3	1	4

Semifinals
3	(United States) Seattle Sounders FC	0	1	1
2	(Mexico) Santos Laguna	1	1	2
4	(United States) Los Angeles Galaxy	1	0	1
1	(Mexico) Monterrey	2	1	3

Finals
2	(Mexico) Santos Laguna	0	2	2
1	(Mexico) Monterrey	0	4	4

=== Quarterfinals ===
Team 1	Agg.	Team 2	1st leg	2nd leg
Xelajú (Guatemala)	2–4	(Mexico) Monterrey	1–3	1–1
Houston Dynamo (United States)	1–3	(Mexico) Santos Laguna	1–0	0–3
Tigres UANL (Mexico)	2–3	(United States) Seattle Sounders FC	1–0	1–3
Herediano (Costa Rica)	1–4	(United States) Los Angeles Galaxy	0–0	1–4

=== Semifinals ===
Team 1	Agg.	Team 2	1st leg	2nd leg
Los Angeles Galaxy (United States)	1–3	(Mexico) Monterrey	1–2	0–1
Seattle Sounders FC (United States)	1–2	(Mexico) Santos Laguna	0–1	1–1

=== Final ===
Team 1	Agg.	Team 2	1st leg	2nd leg
Santos Laguna (Mexico)	2–4	(Mexico) Monterrey	0–0	2–4

CONCACAF Champions League
2012–13 champion

Third title

== Awards ==
Award	Player	Team
Golden Ball	(Mexico) Aldo de Nigris	(Mexico) Monterrey
Golden Boot	(Panama) Nicolás Muñoz	(El Salvador) Isidro Metapán
Golden Boot	(Colombia) Darwin Quintero	(Mexico) Santos Laguna
Best Goalkeeper	(Mexico) Oswaldo Sánchez	(Mexico) Santos Laguna

== Top goalscorers ==
Rank	Player	Club	Goals
1	(Panama) Nicolás Muñoz	(El Salvador) Isidro Metapán	6
1	(Colombia) Darwin Quintero	(Mexico) Santos Laguna	6
3	(Mexico) Aldo de Nigris	(Mexico) Monterrey	5
3	(Chile) Humberto Suazo	(Mexico) Monterrey	5
5	(United States) Jack McBean	(United States) Los Angeles Galaxy	4
5	(United States) Sammy Ochoa	(United States) Seattle Sounders FC	4
5	(Mexico) Alan Pulido	(Mexico) Tigres UANL	4
8	(Argentina) Neri Cardozo	(Mexico) Monterrey	3
8	(Mexico) Darío Carreño	(Mexico) Monterrey	3
8	(Guatemala) Edgar Chinchilla	(Guatemala) Xelajú	3
8	(Canada) Terry Dunfield	(Canada) Toronto FC	3
8	(Mexico) Marco Fabián	(Mexico) Guadalajara	3
8	(United States) Herculez Gomez	(Mexico) Santos Laguna	3
8	(Mexico) Ángel Reyna	(Mexico) Monterrey	3

== See also ==
- 2013 FIFA Club World Cup
