= 2010–11 Santos Laguna season =

Santos Laguna
2010–11 season
- President: Alejandro Irarragorri
- Manager: Rubén Omar Romano; Diego Cocca
- Stadium: Estadio Corona
- Torneo Apertura Torneo Clausura: 3rd 9th
- Apertura Liguilla: Runner-up
- Clausura Liguilla: Did not qualify
- Top goalscorer: League: Apertura: Christian Benítez (16); Clausura: Christian Benítez (4); Daniel Ludueña (4); Oribe Peralta (4); All: Christian Benítez (20)

The 2010–11 Santos Laguna season was the 64th professional season of Mexico's top-flight football league. The season is split into two tournaments—the Torneo Apertura and the Torneo Clausura—each with identical formats and each contested by the same eighteen teams. Santos Laguna will begin their season on July 24, 2010, against Atlante, Santos Laguna played their homes games on Saturdays at 7pm local time.

== Torneo Apertura ==
=== Squad ===
Note: Flags indicate national team as defined under FIFA eligibility rules; some limited exceptions apply. Players may hold more than one non-FIFA nationality.

| No. | Pos. | Nation | Player |
|---|---|---|---|
| 1 | GK | MEX | Oswaldo Sánchez |
| 3 | DF | URU | Jonathan Lacerda |
| 4 | DF | MEX | Jorge Iván Estrada |
| 5 | MF | MEX | Fernando Arce |
| 7 | FW | MEX | José María Cárdenas |
| 8 | MF | MEX | Carlos Adrián Morales |
| 9 | MF | CHI | Rodrigo Ruiz |
| 10 | MF | ARG | Daniel Ludueña |
| 11 | FW | ECU | Christian Benítez |
| 12 | DF | MEX | José León Hoyo |
| 13 | FW | MEX | José Rodolfo Reyes |
| 15 | MF | MEX | Jaime Toledo |
| 17 | MF | MEX | Rodolfo Salinas |
| 18 | DF | MEX | Eder Castro |

| No. | Pos. | Nation | Player |
|---|---|---|---|
| 19 | DF | MEX | Rafael Figueroa |
| 21 | DF | MEX | Juan Pablo Santiago |
| 23 | DF | PAN | Felipe Baloy |
| 24 | FW | MEX | Oribe Peralta |
| 25 | GK | MEX | Miguel Becerra |
| 26 | MF | MEX | Francisco Javier Torres |
| 27 | DF | MEX | José Antonio Olvera |
| 28 | FW | COL | Carlos Darwin Quintero |
| 32 | GK | MEX | Julio González |
| 35 | MF | MEX | Alberto Soto |
| 46 | MF | MEX | Arnulfo González |
| 47 | DF | MEX | Uriel Álvarez |
| 58 | MF | MEX | Juan Pablo Rodriguez |

=== Out on loan ===
Note: Flags indicate national team as defined under FIFA eligibility rules; some limited exceptions apply. Players may hold more than one non-FIFA nationality.

| No. | Pos. | Nation | Player |
|---|---|---|---|
| -- | GK | MEX | Milton Aguilar (to Alacranes de Durango) |
| -- | DF | MEX | Osmar Mares (to San Luis F.C.) |
| -- | DF | MEX | Jorge Alberto Campos (to Albinegros de Orizaba) |
| -- | DF | MEX | Jorge Barrera (to C.F. La Piedad) |
| -- | DF | MEX | Juan Carlos Arellano (to Club Universidad de Guadalajara) |
| -- | MF | ARG | Walter Jiménez (to Club de Gimnasia y Esgrima La Plata) |

| No. | Pos. | Nation | Player |
|---|---|---|---|
| -- | MF | MEX | Pedro Javier Jiménez (to Irapuato FC) |
| -- | MF | MEX | Miguel Zepeda (to Club Universidad de Guadalajara) |
| -- | MF | MEX | Diego Armando Esqueda (to Club Universidad de Guadalajara) |
| -- | FW | MEX | Agustín Enrique Herrera (to Mérida F.C.) |
| -- | FW | MEX | Carlos Ochoa (to Chiapas) |
| -- | FW | MEX | Joaquín Reyes (to Tiburones Rojos de Veracruz) |

=== Regular season ===
| July 24, 2010 Round 1 | Atlante | 1 – 4 | Santos Laguna | Estadio Andrés Quintana Roo, Cancún |
| 9:00pm | Solari 52' (pen.) | Report | Benítez 28', 89'; Ludueña 40'; Morales 87' | Referee: Francisco Chacón |

| July 31, 2010 Round 2 | Santos Laguna | 4 – 0 | UNAM | Estadio Corona, Torreón |
| 5:00pm | Palacios 26' (o.g.); Rodríguez 53' (pen.); Benítez 56'; Peralta 84' | Report | | Referee: José Alfredo Peñaloza |

| August 7, 2010 Round 3 | Pachuca | 0 – 3 | Santos Laguna | Estadio Hidalgo, Pachuca |
| 7:00pm | | Report | Quintero 23'; Benítez 57', 82' | Referee: Roberto García |

| August 14, 2010 Round 4 | Santos Laguna | 1 – 0 | Chiapas | Estadio Corona, Torreón |
| 5:00pm | Benítez 46' | Report | | Referee: Miguel Ángel Ayala |

| August 21, 2010 Round 5 | UANL | 1 – 0 | Santos Laguna | Estadio Universitario, San Nicolás |
| 7:00pm | Juninho 8' | Report | | Referee: Marco Antonio Rodríguez |

| August 27, 2010 Round 6 | Santos Laguna | 3 – 1 | Atlas | Estadio Corona, Torreón |
| 7:00pm | Morales 57'; Benítez 62'; Ludueña 83' | Report | Fuentes 85' | Referee: Armando Archundia |

| September 11, 2010 Round 7 | Querétaro | 5 – 2 | Santos Laguna | Estadio La Corregidora, Querétaro |
| 5:00pm | Beltrán 27'; Blanco 45', 69', 87'; Altamirano 90' | Report | Benítez 4'; Borelli 71' (o.g.) | Referee: Miguel Ángel Flores |

| September 18, 2010 Round 8 | Santos Laguna | 2 – 1 | Necaxa | Estadio Corona, Torreón |
| 7:00pm | Baloy 45'; Benítez 90+3' | Report | Mosqueda 39' | Referee: José Alfredo Peñaloza |

| September 26, 2010 Round 9 | América | 3 – 2 | Santos Laguna | Estadio Azteca, Mexico City |
| 4:30pm | Sánchez 23'; Vuoso 30' 37' | Report | Benítez 4'; Arce 41' | Referee: Jorge Eduardo Gasso |

| October 2, 2010 Round 10 | Santos Laguna | 2 – 0 | Toluca | Estadio Corona, Torreón |
| 7:00pm | Cárdenas 38'; Benítez 43' | Report | | Referee: Francisco Chacón |

| October 10, 2010 Round 11 | Morelia | 0 – 0 | Santos Laguna | Estadio Morelos, Morelia |
| 12:00pm | | Report | | Referee: Paul Delgadillo |

| October 16, 2010 Round 12 | Cruz Azul | 3 – 0 | Santos Laguna | Estadio Azul, Mexico City |
| 5:00pm | Vela 6'; Cervantes 46'; Giménez 89' | Report | | Referee: Mauricio Morales |

| October 23, 2010 Round 13 | Santos Laguna | 1 – 2 | Monterrey | Estadio Corona, Torreón |
| 7:00pm | Benítez 33' | Report | Suazo 4'; O. Martínez 48' | Referee: Jorge Gasso |

| October 27, 2010 Round 14 | Puebla | 0 – 1 | Santos Laguna | Estadio Cuauhtémoc, Puebla |
| 8:00pm | | Report | Estrada 67' | Referee: Román Rafael Medina |

| October 30, 2010 Round 15 | Santos Laguna | 1 – 1 | Guadalajara | Estadio Corona, Torreón |
| 7:00pm | Benítez 87' | Report | Arellano 89' | Referee: Miguel Ángel Ayala |

| November 6, 2010 Round 16 | San Luis | 1 – 1 | Santos Laguna | Estadio Alfonso Lastras, San Luis Potosí |
| 5:00pm | de la Torre 58' | Report | Benítez 54' | Referee: Fernando Guerrero |

| November 13, 2010 Round 17 | Santos Laguna | 1 – 0 | Estudiantes Tecos | Estadio Corona, Torreón |
| 7:00pm | Ludueña 10' | Report | | Referee: Armando Archundia |

==== Final Phase ====
| November 18, 2010 Quarterfinals | Chiapas | 1 – 1 | Santos Laguna | Estadio Victor Manuel Reyna, Tuxtla Gutierrez |
| 8:00pm | Ochoa 33' | Report | Arce 22' | Referee: Jorge Gasso |

| November 21, 2010 Quarterfinals | Santos Laguna | 1 – 0 | Chiapas | Estadio Corona, Torreón |
| 6:00pm | Rodríguez 90+5' (pen.) | Report | | Referee: Roberto García Orozco |

Santos Laguna won 2-1 on aggregate

| November 25, 2010 Semifinals | América | 1 – 2 | Santos Laguna | Estadio Azteca, Mexico City |
| 7:00pm | Reyna 19' | Report | Quintero 9'; Benítez 89' | Referee: Jaime Herrera |

| November 28, 2010 Semifinals | Santos Laguna | 3 – 3 | América | Estadio Corona, Torreón |
| 6:00pm | Quintero 2', 61'; Benítez 75' | Report | Sánchez 60'; Vuoso 66'; Esqueda 85' | Referee: Francisco Chacón |

Santos Laguna won 5-4 on aggregate

| December 2, 2010 Final | Santos Laguna | 3 – 2 | Monterrey | Estadio Corona, Torreón |
| 8:00pm | Estrada 23'; Quintero 41'; Davino 85' (o.g.) | Report | Suazo 37'; Cardozo 54' | Referee: Marco Antonio Rodríguez |

| December 5, 2010 Final | Monterrey | 3 – 0 | Santos Laguna | Estadio Tecnológico, Monterrey |
| 6:00pm | Suazo 28', 85'; Basanta 72' | Report | | Referee: Armando Archundia |

Monterrey won 5-3 on aggregate

==== CONCACAF Champions League ====
| July 27, 2010 Preliminary Round | (Trinidad and Tobago) San Juan Jabloteh | 0 – 1 | Santos Laguna | Marvin Lee Stadium, Tunapuna |
| 8:00pm | | Report | Ruiz 83' | Attendance: 763; Referee: Stanley Lancaster (Guyana) |

| August 4, 2010 Preliminary Round | Santos Laguna | 5 – 0 | (Trinidad and Tobago) San Juan Jabloteh | Estadio Corona, Torreón |
| 10:00pm | Reyes 3', 80'; Salinas 46'; Quintero 73'; González 83' | Report | | Attendance: 10,000; Referee: Paul Ward (Canada) |

| August 18, 2010 Group stage | (Trinidad and Tobago) Joe Public | 2 – 5 | Santos Laguna | Marvin Lee Stadium, Tunapuna |
| 8:00pm (Eastern time) | Hislop 11'; Hoshide 44' | Report | Cárdenas 9', 24', 66', 76'; Enriquez 90' | Attendance: 900; Referee: Roberto Moreno (Panama) |

| August 24, 2010 Group stage | Santos Laguna | 1 – 0 | (United States) Columbus Crew | Estadio Corona, Torreón |
| 10:00pm (Eastern time) | Santiago (yellow card) 20'; Morales (yellow card) 76'; Estrada 90+3' | | Griffit (yellow card) 17'; Renteria (yellow card) 22'; Iro (yellow card) 60'; Garey (yellow card) 77'; Gruenebaum (yellow card) 84' | Attendance: 4,700; Referee: Luis Rodriguez (Panama) |

| September 14, 2010 Group stage | (Guatemala) Municipal | 2 – 2 | Santos Laguna | Estadio Mateo Flores, Guatemala City |
| 10:00pm (Eastern time) | Rodríguez 28'; Castillo 87' (pen.) | Report | Ruiz 8' (pen.); Peralta 13' | Attendance: 10,414; Referee: Walter Quesada (Costa Rica) |

| September 21, 2010 Group stage | (United States) Columbus Crew | 1 – 0 | Santos Laguna | Columbus Crew Stadium, Columbus |
| 8:00pm (Eastern time) | Mendoza 87' | | | Attendance: 6,298; Referee: Courtney Campbell (Jamaica) |

| September 29, 2010 Group stage | Santos Laguna | 5 – 1 | (Trinidad and Tobago) Joe Public | Estadio Corona, Torreón |
| 10:00pm (Eastern time) | Reyes 4'; Torres 14'; Quintero 60'; Cárdenas 67'; Figueroa 79' | Report | Baptiste 32' | Attendance: 7,000; Referee: Mark Geiger (United States) |

| October 19, 2010 Group stage | Santos Laguna | 6 – 1 | (Guatemala) Municipal | Estadio Corona, Torreón |
| 10:00pm (Eastern time) | Peralta 20', 51'; Ludueña 27', 87'; Ruiz 40'; Quintero 81' | Report | Castillo 39' | Attendance: 3,600; Referee: Roberto Moreno (Panama) |

=== Goalscorers ===
| Position | Nation | Name | League | Champions League | Total |
|---|---|---|---|---|---|
| 1. | (Ecuador) | Christian Benítez | 16 | | 16 |
| 2. | (Colombia) | Carlos Quintero | 5 | 3 | 8 |
| 3. | (Mexico) | José María Cárdenas | 1 | 5 | 6 |
| 4. | (Argentina) | Daniel Ludueña | 3 | 2 | 5 |
| 5. | (Mexico) | Oribe Peralta | 1 | 3 | 4 |
| 6. | (Mexico) | Jorge Iván Estrada | 2 | 1 | 3 |
| 6. | (Mexico) | José Rodolfo Reyes | | 3 | 3 |
| 6. | (Chile) | Rodrigo Ruiz | | 3 | 3 |
| 6. | | Own Goals | 3 | | 3 |
| 10. | (Mexico) | Fernando Arce | 2 | | 2 |
| 10. | (Mexico) | Carlos Adrián Morales | 2 | | 2 |
| 10. | (Mexico) | Juan Pablo Rodríguez | 2 | | 2 |
| 13. | (Panama) | Felipe Baloy | 1 | | 1 |
| 13. | (Mexico) | Juan Carlos Enriquez | | 1 | 1 |
| 13. | (Mexico) | Rafael Figueroa | | 1 | 1 |
| 13. | (Mexico) | Arnulfo González | | 1 | 1 |
| 13. | (Mexico) | Rodolfo Salinas | | 1 | 1 |
| 13. | (Mexico) | Francisco Javier Torres | | 1 | 1 |
| TOTAL | | | 38 | 25 | 63 |

=== Results ===
==== Results summary ====
| Overall | | | | | | | | Home | | | | | | Away | | | | | |
| Pld | W | D | L | GF | GA | GD | Pts | W | D | L | GF | GA | GD | W | D | L | GF | GA | GD |
|---|---|---|---|---|---|---|---|---|---|---|---|---|---|---|---|---|---|---|---|
| 17 | 9 | 3 | 5 | 28 | 19 | +9 | 30 | 6 | 1 | 1 | 15 | 5 | +10 | 3 | 2 | 4 | 13 | 14 | −1 |

Last updated: 29 January 2011.
Source: Regular season

==== Results by round ====
| Round | 1 | 2 | 3 | 4 | 5 | 6 | 7 | 8 | 9 | 10 | 11 | 12 | 13 | 14 | 15 | 16 | 17 |
|---|---|---|---|---|---|---|---|---|---|---|---|---|---|---|---|---|---|
| Ground | A | H | A | H | A | H | A | H | A | H | A | A | H | A | H | A | H |
| Result | W | W | W | W | L | W | L | W | L | W | D | L | L | W | D | D | W |
| Position | 1 | 1 | 1 | 1 | 1 | 1 | 2 | 2 | 3 | 3 | 3 | 3 | 3 | 3 | 3 | 3 | 3 |

Updated to match(es) played on 29 January 2011. Source: Regular season and mediotiempo.com
A = Away; H = Home; W = Win; D = Draw; L = Loss

== Torneo Clausura ==
=== Squad ===
As of July 2, 2010 Note: Flags indicate national team as defined under FIFA eligibility rules; some limited exceptions apply. Players may hold more than one non-FIFA nationality.

| No. | Pos. | Nation | Player |
|---|---|---|---|
| 1 | GK | MEX | Oswaldo Sánchez (Captain) |
| 4 | DF | MEX | Jorge Iván Estrada |
| 5 | MF | MEX | Fernando Arce |
| 7 | FW | MEX | José María Cárdenas |
| 8 | MF | MEX | Carlos Adrián Morales |
| 9 | MF | CHI | Rodrigo Ruiz |
| 10 | MF | ARG | Daniel Ludueña * |
| 11 | FW | ECU | Christian Benítez |
| 12 | DF | MEX | José León Hoyo |
| 13 | FW | MEX | José Rodolfo Reyes |
| 14 | DF | MEX | Uriel Álvarez |
| 15 | MF | MEX | Jaime Toledo |
| 17 | MF | MEX | Rodolfo Salinas |

| No. | Pos. | Nation | Player |
|---|---|---|---|
| 19 | DF | MEX | Rafael Figueroa |
| 21 | DF | MEX | Juan Pablo Santiago |
| 23 | DF | PAN | Felipe Baloy |
| 24 | FW | MEX | Oribe Peralta |
| 25 | GK | MEX | Miguel Becerra |
| 27 | DF | MEX | José Antonio Olvera |
| 28 | FW | COL | Carlos Darwin Quintero |
| 32 | GK | MEX | Julio González |
| 44 | FW | USA | Gustavo Ruelas |
| 46 | MF | MEX | Arnulfo González |
| 58 | MF | MEX | Juan Pablo Rodriguez (Vice-Captain) |
| 80 | DF | URU | Jonathan Lacerda |

=== Out on loan ===
Note: Flags indicate national team as defined under FIFA eligibility rules; some limited exceptions apply. Players may hold more than one non-FIFA nationality.

| No. | Pos. | Nation | Player |
|---|---|---|---|
| — | MF | ECU | Pedro Quiñones (to Universidad de Quito) |
| — | GK | MEX | Milton Aguilar (to Alacranes de Durango) |
| — | DF | MEX | Jorge Alberto Campos (to Albinegros de Orizaba) |
| — | DF | MEX | Juan Carlos Arellano (to Club Universidad de Guadalajara) |
| — | DF | MEX | Jorge Barrera (to C.F. La Piedad) |
| — | DF | MEX | Osmar Mares (to San Luis) |
| — | MF | ARG | Walter Jiménez (to Puebla) |

| No. | Pos. | Nation | Player |
|---|---|---|---|
| — | MF | MEX | Diego Armando Esqueda (to Club Universidad de Guadalajara) |
| — | MF | MEX | Miguel Zepeda (to Club Universidad de Guadalajara) |
| — | MF | MEX | Pedro Javier Jiménez (to Irapuato FC) |
| — | MF | MEX | Francisco Javier Torres (to Chiapas) |
| — | FW | MEX | Agustín Enrique Herrera (to Merida) |
| — | FW | MEX | Joaquín Reyes (to Tiburones Rojos de Veracruz) |

=== Regular season ===
| January 8, 2011 Round 1 | Santos Laguna | 2 – 1 | Atlante | Estadio Corona, Torreón |
| 7:00pm | Quintero 54'; Benítez 72' | Report | Navarro 81' | Referee: Miguel Ángel Ortega |

| January 16, 2011 Round 2 | UNAM | 2 – 0 | Santos Laguna | Estadio Olímpico Universitario, Mexico City |
| 12:00pm | Cacho 62'; López 82' | Report | | Referee: Miguel Ángel Flores |

| January 22, 2011 Round 3 | Santos Laguna | 1 – 1 | Pachuca | Estadio Corona, Torreón |
| 7:00pm | Ludueña 43' | Report | Benítez 44' | Referee: Marco Antonio Rodríguez |

| January 29, 2011 Round 4 | Chiapas | 1 – 2 | Santos Laguna | Estadio Victor Manuel Reyna, Tuxtla Gutierrez |
| 5:00pm | Flores 71' | Report | Benítez 37'; Quintero 48' | Referee: Jorge Macías Romo |

| February 5, 2011 Round 5 | Santos Laguna | 0 – 2 | UANL | Estadio Corona, Torreón |
| 7:00pm | Mancilla 8'; Juninho 44' | Report | | Referee: Jorge Isaac Rojas |

| February 12, 2011 Round 6 | Atlas | 1 – 2 | Santos Laguna | Estadio Jalisco, Guadalajara |
| 8:45pm | Conde 56' | report | Arce 36'; Rodríguez 38' (pen.) | Referee: Francisco Chacón |

| February 19, 2011 Round 7 | Santos Laguna | 0 – 2 | Querétaro | Estadio Corona, Torreón |
| 7:00pm | | Report | Acuña 2'; Bueno 42' | Referee: Marco Antonio Rodríguez |

| February 25, 2011 Round 8 | Necaxa | 1 – 0 | Santos Laguna | Estadio Victoria, Aguascalientes |
| 8:10pm | Íñiguez 74' | Report | | Referee: Jorge Eduardo Gasso |

| March 5, 2011 Round 9 | Santos Laguna | 2 – 3 | América | Estadio Corona, Torreón |
| 7:00PM | Peralta 30', 65' | Report | Reyna 52', 89'; Sánchez 62' | Referee: Miguel Ángel Ortega |

| March 13, 2011 Round 10 | Toluca | 3 – 1 | Santos Laguna | Estadio Nemesio Díez, Toluca |
| 12:00pm | Ayoví 1'; Novaretti 5'; Cerda 89' | Report | Peralta 36' | Referee: Roberto García Orozco |

| March 19, 2011 Round 11 | Santos Laguna | 0 – 1 | Morelia | Estadio Corona, Torreón |
| 7:00pm | | Report | Márquez 86' | Referee: Miguel Ángel Ayala |

| April 2, 2011 Round 12 | Santos Laguna | 3 – 0 | Cruz Azul | Estadio Corona, Torreón |
| 5:00pm | Quintero 1'; Estrada 30'; Rodríguez 73' | Report | | Referee: Juan Genaro Medrano |

| April 9, 2011 Round 13 | Monterrey | 1 − 1 | Santos Laguna | Estadio Tecnológico, Monterrey |
| 5:00pm | Arellano 23' | Report | Peralta 9' | Referee: Mauricio Rafael Morales |

| April 13, 2011 Round 14 | Santos Laguna | 4 – 0 | Puebla | Estadio Corona, Torreón |
| 7:00pm | Ludueña 16', 35'; Benítez 59'; Toledo 66' | Report | | Referee: Miguel Ángel Ortega |

| April 16, 2011 Round 15 | Guadalajara | 0 – 1 | Santos Laguna | Estadio Omnilife, Zapopan |
| 7:00pm | | Report | Baloy 90+2' | Referee: Paul Enrique Delgadillo |

| April 23, 2011 Round 16 | Santos Laguna | 1 – 3 | San Luis | Estadio Corona, Torreón |
| 7:00pm | Rodríguez 80' | Report | Aguirre 30', 32', 60' | Referee: Jorge Eduardo Gasso |

| April 29, 2011 Round 17 | Estudiantes Tecos | 1 – 3 | Santos Laguna | Estadio Tres de Marzo, Zapopan |
| 8:10pm | Cejas 10' | Report | Ludueña 21'; Figueroa 75'; Benítez 90' | Referee: Mauricio Morales |

==== CONCACAF Champions League ====
| February 22, 2011 Quarterfinals - First Leg | Cruz Azul (Mexico) | 2 – 0 | (Mexico) Santos Laguna | Estadio Azul, Mexico City |
| 9:00pm | Orozco 58'; Giménez 68' | Report | | Attendance: 14,062; Referee: Paul Delgadillo (Mexico) |

| March 1, 2011 Quarterfinals - Second Leg | Santos Laguna (Mexico) | v | (Mexico) Cruz Azul | Estadio Corona, Torreón |
| 7:00pm |

=== Goalscorers ===
| Position | Nation | Name | Total |
|---|---|---|---|
| 1. | (Ecuador) | Christian Benítez | 4 |
| 1. | (Argentina) | Daniel Ludueña | 4 |
| 1. | (Mexico) | Oribe Peralta | 4 |
| 4. | (Colombia) | Carlos Darwin Quintero | 3 |
| 4. | (Mexico) | Juan Pablo Rodríguez | 3 |
| 6. | (Mexico) | Jorge Iván Estrada | 1 |
| 6. | (Mexico) | Fernando Arce | 1 |
| 6. | (Panama) | Felipe Baloy | 1 |
| 6. | (Mexico) | Rafael Figueroa | 1 |
| 6. | (Mexico) | Jaime Toledo | 1 |
| TOTAL | | | 23 |

=== Results ===
==== Results summary ====
| Overall | | | | | | | | Home | | | | | | Away | | | | | |
| Pld | W | D | L | GF | GA | GD | Pts | W | D | L | GF | GA | GD | W | D | L | GF | GA | GD |
|---|---|---|---|---|---|---|---|---|---|---|---|---|---|---|---|---|---|---|---|
| 17 | 7 | 2 | 8 | 23 | 23 | 0 | 23 | 3 | 1 | 5 | 13 | 13 | 0 | 4 | 1 | 3 | 10 | 10 | 0 |

Last updated: 29 April 2011.
Source: Clausura 2011 results

==== Results by round ====
| Round | 1 | 2 | 3 | 4 | 5 | 6 | 7 | 8 | 9 | 10 | 11 | 12 | 13 | 14 | 15 | 16 | 17 |
|---|---|---|---|---|---|---|---|---|---|---|---|---|---|---|---|---|---|
| Ground | H | A | H | A | H | A | H | A | H | A | H | H | A | H | A | H | A |
| Result | L | W | D | W | L | W | L | L | L | W | L | W | D | W | W | L | W |
| Position | 5 | 9 | 9 | 7 | 8 | 7 | 11 | 13 | 13 | 16 | 16 | 14 | 15 | 12 | 11 | 12 | 9 |

Updated to match(es) played on 6 May 2011. Source: Clausura 2011 results and mediotiempo.com
A = Away; H = Home; W = Win; D = Draw; L = Loss
