= 2012–13 Club Santos Laguna season =

Santos Laguna
2012–13 season
- Chairman: Alejandro Irarragorri
- Manager: Benjamín Galindo (until November 15, 2012); Pedro Caixinha (from November 20, 2012)
- Stadium: Estadio Corona
- Apertura 2012: 9th
- Clausura 2013: 6th Final phase semi-finals
- Champions League: Runners-up
- Top goalscorer: League: Apertura: Carlos Quintero (7); Clausura: Oribe Peralta (8); All: Carlos Quintero (19)
- Highest home attendance: Apertura: 25,990 vs Cruz Azul (November 2, 2012); Clausura: 28,957 vs Cruz Azul (May 16, 2013)
- Lowest home attendance: Apertura: 20,075 vs Chiapas (September 22, 2012); Clausura: 19,856 vs Atlas (May 9, 2013)
Home colours	Away colours

The 2012–13 Santos Laguna season was the 66th professional season of Mexico's top-flight football league. The season is split into two tournaments—the Torneo Apertura and the Torneo Clausura—each with identical formats and each contested by the same eighteen teams. Santos Laguna began their season on July 21, 2012 against San Luis, Santos Laguna played most their homes games on Saturdays at 7:00pm local time. Santos Laguna did not qualify to the final phase in the Apertura tournament and was eliminated in the semi-finals of the final phase by Cruz Azul in the Clausura tournament. Santos Laguna lost the 2012–13 CONCACAF Champions League final to Monterrey 4–2 on aggregate.

== Torneo Apertura ==
=== Squad ===
Note: Flags indicate national team as defined under FIFA eligibility rules; some limited exceptions apply. Players may hold more than one non-FIFA nationality.

No.	Pos.	Nation	Player
1	GK	(Mexico) MEX	Oswaldo Sánchez (captain)
2	DF	(Mexico) MEX	Oswaldo Alanís
3	FW	(Colombia) COL	Carlos Darwin Quintero
4	DF	(Mexico) MEX	Jorge Iván Estrada
5	DF	(Mexico) MEX	Aarón Galindo
6	MF	(Spain) ESP	Marc Crosas
7	MF	(Mexico) MEX	Édgar Lugo
8	MF	(Mexico) MEX	Juan Pablo Rodríguez (vice-captain)
10	MF	(Argentina) ARG	Daniel Ludueña
13	FW	(Ecuador) ECU	Christian Suárez

No.	Pos.	Nation	Player
14	DF	(Mexico) MEX	César Ibáñez
16	FW	(United States) USA	Herculez Gomez
17	MF	(Mexico) MEX	Rodolfo Salinas
18	DF	(Argentina) ARG	Santiago Hoyos
19	DF	(Mexico) MEX	Rafael Figueroa
20	DF	(Mexico) MEX	Osmar Mares
23	DF	(Panama) PAN	Felipe Baloy
24	FW	(Mexico) MEX	Oribe Peralta
25	GK	(Mexico) MEX	Miguel Becerra
37	MF	(Mexico) MEX	Cándido Ramírez

=== Out on loan ===
Note: Flags indicate national team as defined under FIFA eligibility rules; some limited exceptions apply. Players may hold more than one non-FIFA nationality.

No.	Pos.	Nation	Player
—	GK	(Mexico) MEX	Milton Aguilar (to Alacranes)
—	DF	(Uruguay) URU	Jonathan Lacerda (to Puebla)
—	DF	(Mexico) MEX	Jorge Barrera (to Correcaminos)
—	DF	(Mexico) MEX	Juan Pablo Santiago (to Tijuana)
—	DF	(Mexico) MEX	Uriel Álvarez (to Morelia)
—	DF	(Mexico) MEX	José Antonio Olvera (to Morelia)
—	MF	(Mexico) MEX	Francisco Javier Torres (to Morelia)

No.	Pos.	Nation	Player
—	MF	(Mexico) MEX	Miguel Zepeda (to U de G)
—	FW	(Mexico) MEX	Agustín Enrique Herrera (to Veracruz)
—	FW	(United States) USA	Gustavo Ruelas (to Chiapas)
—	FW	(Mexico) MEX	Joaquín Reyes (to Celaya)
—	FW	(Mexico) MEX	José Rodolfo Reyes (to Estudiantes Tecos)
—	FW	(Mexico) MEX	Carlos Ochoa (to Morelia)

=== Regular season ===
Win Draw Loss

==== Apertura 2012 results ====
July 21, 2012 Round 1	Santos Laguna	2 – 1	San Luis	Torreón, Coahuila
19:00	Quintero 3'; Suárez (yellow card) 20'; Mares (yellow card) 51'; Gómez 72'	Report	López 1'; Velasco (yellow card) 27'; Paredes (yellow card) 89'	Stadium: Estadio Corona; Referee: Miguel Ángel Ayala

July 29, 2012 Round 2	Guadalajara	0 – 1	Santos Laguna	Zapopan, Jalisco
17:00	de Luna (yellow card) 42'	Report	Gómez (yellow card) 45+'; Mares (yellow card) 64'; Crosas (yellow card) 81'; Sánchez (yellow card) 87'; Quintero 89'	Stadium: Estadio Omnilife; Referee: Marco Antonio Rodríguez

August 3, 2012 Round 3	Santos Laguna	2 – 2	Puebla	Torreón, Coahuila
19:00	Qunitero 5'; Gómez 14'	Report	Alustiza (yellow card) 64', (goal) 65', 80'; Chávez (yellow card) 67'	Stadium: Estadio Corona; Attendance: 20,364; Referee: Francisco Chacón

August 10, 2012 Round 4	León	3 – 0	Santos Laguna	León, Guanajuato
20:30	González 35'; Burbano (yellow card) 67'; Maz 75'; Peña 85'	Report	Gómez (yellow card) 13'; Sánchez (yellow card) 51'; Crosas (yellow card) 79'; Baloy (yellow card) 84'	Stadium: Estadio León; Attendance: 23,777; Referee: Óscar Macias

August 18, 2012 Round 5	Santos Laguna	1 – 2	UNAM	Torreón, Coahuila
19:00	Ibañez (yellow card) 23'; Ludueña 61'	Report	Chiapas (yellow card) 2'; Villa 30', 48'; Palacios (yellow card) 49'; Velarde (yellow card) 63'	Stadium: Estadio Corona; Referee: Jorge Isaac Rojas

August 25, 2012 Round 6	Pachuca	0 – 0	Santos Laguna	Pachuca, Hidalgo
19:00	Cejas (yellow card) 33'; Hernández (yellow card) 65'; Rojas (yellow card) 90+1'	Report	Ramírez (yellow card) 64'; Salinas (yellow card) 79'	Stadium: Estadio Hidalgo; Attendance: 17,921; Referee: Fabricio Morales

September 1, 2012 Round 7	Santos Laguna	3 – 1	UANL	Torreón, Coahuila
19:00	Quintero 12', 74'; Peralta 15'; Adschi (yellow card) 21'; Rodríguez (yellow card) 36'; Ramírez (yellow card) 82'	Report	Juninho (yellow card) 10'; Lobos 37' (pen.)	Stadium: Estadio Corona; Attendance: 23,800; Referee: Ricardo Arellano

September 15, 2012 Round 8	América	2 – 0	Santos Laguna	Mexico City
17:00	Jiménez 48'; Benítez 74'; Urias (yellow card) 90+4'	Report	Ramírez (yellow card) 60'; Salinas (yellow card) 83'	Stadium: Estadio Azteca; Attendance: 18,844; Referee: Luis Enrique Santander

September 22, 2012 Round 9	Santos Laguna	0 – 0	Chiapas	Torreón, Coahuila
19:00	Escoboza (yellow card) 69'	Report		Stadium: Estadio Corona; Attendance: 20,075; Referee: Francisco Chacón

September 30, 2012 Round 10	Atlante	1 – 3	Santos Laguna	Cancún, Quintana Roo
18:00	Guagua (yellow card) 43'; Nápoles 82'	Report	Ludueña 14'; Quintero 58'; Salinas (yellow card) 60'; Peralta 84'	Stadium: Estadio Andrés Quintana Roo; Attendance: 6,000; Referee: Fernando Guerrero

October 3, 2012 Round 11	Santos Laguna	2 – 1	Atlas	Torreón, Coahuila
20:00	Alanis (yellow card) 3'; Peralta 10', (yellow card) 83'; Ramírez 39'; Crosas (yellow card) 77'	Report	Mancilla 3' (pen.); Bocanegra (yellow card) 44' (yellow-red card) 66'; Vigón (yellow card) 48'	Stadium: Estadio Corona; Attendance: 20,699; Referee: Roberto García Orozco

October 6, 2012 Round 12	Querétaro	1 – 1	Santos Laguna	Querétaro, Querétaro
17:00	Escalante (yellow card) 30'; Landín 51'; Bueno (yellow card) 81'	Report	Gómez 36'; Mares (yellow card) 49'	Stadium: Estadio Corregidora; Referee: Miguel Ángel Ayala Ramírez

October 12, 2012 Round 13	Santos Laguna	2 – 2	Tijuana	Torreón, Coahuila
19:00	Ludueña 8', 73'; Salinas (yellow card) 26'	Report	Garza 28'; Leandro (yellow card) 39'; Hernández (yellow card) 48'; Riascos 68'; Tahuilán (yellow card) 90+3'	Stadium: Estadio Corona; Attendance: 20,092; Referee: Jorge Antonio Pérez

October 21, 2012 Round 14	Toluca	4 – 1	Santos Laguna	Toluca, Estado de Mexico
12:00	Wilson Mathías 10'; Ríos 28'; Benítez (red card) 30'; Tejada 64'; Talavera (yellow card) 71'; Cacho (yellow card) 73'; Lucas Silva 76'; Esquivel (yellow card) 81'	Report	Ludueña (yellow card) 35'; Alanis (yellow card) 49'; Peralta 69'	Stadium: Estadio Nemesio Díez; Referee: Óscar Macias

October 27, 2012 Round 15	Monterrey	3 – 2	Santos Laguna	Monterrey, Nuevo León
19:00	Suazo 12'; Corona (yellow card) 34'; Cardozo (yellow card) 49'; Delgado 54'; Ayoví (yellow card) 62' de Nigris 58'	Report	Baloy (yellow card) 25'; Peralta 41'; Rodríguez (yellow card) 70'; Quintero (yellow card) 73'; Salinas (yellow card) 84'; Gómez 85'	Stadium: Estadio Tecnológico; Attendance: 26,935; Referee: Erim Ramírez

November 2, 2012 Round 16	Santos Laguna	2 – 1	Cruz Azul	Torreón, Coahuila
21:30	Sánchez (yellow card) 37'; Baloy (yellow card) 39'; Quintero 48'; Salinas 77'; Rodríguez (yellow card) 80'; Crosas (yellow card) 90+1'	Report	Giménez 38'; Flores (yellow card) 41'; Torrado (yellow card) 58'; A. Castro (yellow card) 90+4'	Stadium: Estadio Corona; Attendance: 25,990; Referee: Fabricio Morales

November 9, 2012 Round 17	Morelia	2 – 0	Santos Laguna	Morelia, Michoacán
21:30	Huiqui (yellow card) 14'; Sabah 18', 66', (yellow card) 21'; Rojas (yellow card) 51'; Salinas (yellow card) 62'	Report	Baloy (yellow card) 3'; Peralta (yellow card) 8'; Sánchez (yellow card) 51'; Rodríguez (yellow card) 72'	Stadium: Estadio Morelos; Attendance: 18,879; Referee: Marco Antonio Rodríguez

=== Goalscorers ===
Position	Nation	Name	Goals scored
1.	(Colombia)	Carlos Quintero	7
2.	(Mexico)	Oribe Peralta	5
3.	(United States)	Herculez Gómez	4
3.	(Argentina)	Daniel Ludueña	4
5.	(Mexico)	Cándido Ramírez	1
5.	(Mexico)	Rodolfo Salinas	1
TOTAL			22

=== Results ===
==== Results summary ====
Overall								Home						Away					
Pld	W	D	L	GF	GA	GD	Pts	W	D	L	GF	GA	GD	W	D	L	GF	GA	GD
17	6	5	6	22	26	−4	23	4	3	1	14	10	+4	2	2	5	8	16	−8

Last updated: 10 November 2012.
Source: Apertura 2012 results

==== Results by round ====
Round	1	2	3	4	5	6	7	8	9	10	11	12	13	14	15	16	17
Ground	H	A	H	A	H	A	H	A	H	A	H	A	H	A	A	H	A
Result	W	W	D	L	L	D	W	L	D	W	W	D	D	L	L	W	L
Position	4	4	3	6	10	10	7	10	10	6	5	4	6	6	9	8	9

Updated to match(es) played on 11 November 2012. Source: Apertura 2012 results and mediotiempo.com
A = Away; H = Home; W = Win; D = Draw; L = Loss

== Torneo Clausura ==
=== Squad ===
Note: Flags indicate national team as defined under FIFA eligibility rules; some limited exceptions apply. Players may hold more than one non-FIFA nationality.

No.	Pos.	Nation	Player
1	GK	(Mexico) MEX	Oswaldo Sánchez (captain)
2	DF	(Mexico) MEX	Oswaldo Alanís
3	FW	(Colombia) COL	Carlos Darwin Quintero
4	DF	(Mexico) MEX	Jorge Iván Estrada
5	DF	(Mexico) MEX	Aarón Galindo
6	MF	(Spain) ESP	Marc Crosas
7	MF	(Mexico) MEX	Édgar Lugo
8	MF	(Mexico) MEX	Juan Pablo Rodríguez (vice-captain)
9	FW	(Colombia) COL	Andrés Rentería
10	MF	(Argentina) ARG	Mauro Cejas
11	MF	(Mexico) MEX	Néstor Calderón
16	FW	(United States) USA	Hérculez Gómez
17	MF	(Mexico) MEX	Rodolfo Salinas
19	DF	(Mexico) MEX	Rafael Figueroa
20	DF	(Mexico) MEX	Osmar Mares
23	DF	(Panama) PAN	Felipe Baloy
24	FW	(Mexico) MEX	Oribe Peralta

No.	Pos.	Nation	Player
32	GK	(Mexico) MEX	Julio González
36	FW	(Mexico) MEX	Alejandro González
37	MF	(Mexico) MEX	Cándido Ramírez
38	DF	(Mexico) MEX	César Ibáñez
40	GK	(Mexico) MEX	Luis Rubio
43	FW	(Ecuador) ECU	Ely Esterilla
44	FW	(Mexico) MEX	Edgar Martínez
49	FW	(Mexico) MEX	Carlos Parra
53	MF	(Mexico) MEX	Eduardo Palacios
54	MF	(United States) USA	Benji Joya
55	FW	(United States) USA	Daniel Cuevas
57	DF	(Mexico) MEX	Kenyi Adachi
64	FW	(Mexico) MEX	Mario Cárdenas
66	DF	(Mexico) MEX	José Abella
67	DF	(Mexico) MEX	Carlos Torres
69	DF	(Mexico) MEX	Luis Alberto García

=== Out on loan ===
Note: Flags indicate national team as defined under FIFA eligibility rules; some limited exceptions apply. Players may hold more than one non-FIFA nationality.

No.	Pos.	Nation	Player
—	DF	(Uruguay) URU	Jonathan Lacerda (to Puebla)
—	DF	(Mexico) MEX	Juan Pablo Santiago (to Tijuana)
—	DF	(Mexico) MEX	Uriel Álvarez (to Morelia)
—	MF	(Mexico) MEX	Francisco Javier Torres (to Morelia)

No.	Pos.	Nation	Player
—	FW	(Mexico) MEX	Agustín Enrique Herrera (to Estudiantes de Altamira)
—	FW	(Mexico) MEX	José Rodolfo Reyes (to Toros Neza)
—	FW	(Mexico) MEX	Carlos Ochoa (to Morelia)

=== Regular season ===
Win Draw Loss

==== Clausura 2013 results ====
January 5, 2013 Round 1	San Luis	1 – 1	Santos Laguna	San Luis Potosí, San Luis Potosí
21:00	Tréllez (yellow card) 29'; Rojas 66'; Jiménez (yellow card) 67'; Muñoz Mustafá (yellow card) 68' (yellow-red card) 79'; Velasco (yellow card) 75'	Report	Gómez 26'; Mares (yellow card) 29'; Baloy (yellow card) 89'; Figueroa (red card) 90+2'	Stadium: Estadio Alfonso Lastras; Attendance: 8,960; Referee: Miguel Ángel Ortega

January 11, 2013 Round 2	Santos Laguna	2 – 0	Guadalajara	Torreón, Coahuila
21:30	Peralta (yellow card) 33', (goal) 35', 73'; Crosas (yellow card) 44'; Mares (yellow card) 46'; Estrada (yellow card) 55'	Report	Fabián (yellow card) 45+1'; Ponce (yellow card) 74'; S. Pérez (yellow card) 90+1'	Stadium: Estadio Corona; Referee: Roberto García Orozco

January 20, 2013 Round 3	Puebla	2 – 1	Santos Laguna	Puebla, Puebla
12:00	Borjas 33'; Paredes (yellow card) 71'; Durán (yellow card) 89'; Noriega 90+2'	Report	Peralta 56'; Rodríguez (yellow card) 68'; Baloy (yellow card) 90+1'	Stadium: Estadio Cuauhtémoc; Attendance: 18,845; Referee: Antony Zanjuampa

January 25, 2013 Round 4	Santos Laguna	2 – 0	León	Torreón, Coahuila
21:30	Mares (yellow card) 4'; Salinas 17'; Peralta (yellow card) 42', (goal) 56'; Rodríguez (yellow card) 85'	Report	Mascorro (yellow card) 12'; Zataraín (yellow card) 26'; González (yellow card) 75'	Stadium: Estadio Corona; Attendance: 23,141; Referee: Miguel Ángel Flores

February 3, 2013 Round 5	UNAM	0 – 0	Santos Laguna	Coyoacán, Mexico City
12:00	Fuentes (yellow card) 27'; García (yellow card) 30'; Verón (yellow card) 53'; Chiapas (yellow card) 81'	Report	Gómez (yellow card) 31'	Stadium: Estadio Olímpico Universitario; Attendance: 19,583; Referee: José Alfredo Peñaloza

February 8, 2013 Round 6	Santos Laguna	0 – 1	Pachuca	Torreón, Coahuila
16:00	Quintero (yellow card) 4'; Baloy (yellow card) 43'; Estrada (yellow card) 60'; Suárez (yellow card) 90+4'	Report	H. Herrera 10'; Rojas (yellow card) 29'	Stadium: Estadio Corona; Attendance: 23,569; Referee: Marco Antonio Rodríguez

February 16, 2013 Round 7	UANL	1 – 1	Santos Laguna	San Nicolás de los Garza, Nuevo León
19:00	Jiménez (yellow card) 26'; Juninho 36'; Torres Nilo (yellow card) 54'; Salcido (yellow card) 86'	Report	Quintero 1', (yellow card) 83'; Salinas (yellow card) 38'	Stadium: Estadio Universitario; Referee: Erim Ramírez Ulloa

February 22, 2013 Round 8	Santos Laguna	1 – 0	América	Torreón, Coahuila
21:30	Quintero 18', (yellow card) 31'; Mares (yellow card) 45'; Peralta (yellow card) 90+4'	Report	Molina (yellow card) 31'; Medina (yellow card) 44'; Jiménez (yellow card) 48'; Aldrete (yellow card) 52'	Stadium: Estadio Corona; Attendance: 28,232; Referee: Fernando Guerrero

March 1, 2013 Round 9	Chiapas	1 – 3	Santos Laguna	Tuxtla Gutiérrez, Chiapas
19:30	Rey 16'; Arizala (yellow card) 39'	Report	Gómez 13', 20'; Peralta 17', (yellow card) 80'; Baloy (yellow card) 55'	Stadium: Estadio Victor Manuel Reyna; Attendance: 9,953; Referee: Jorge Isaac Rojas

March 9, 2013 Round 10	Santos Laguna	2 – 1	Atlante	Torreón, Coahuila
19:00	Gómez 43', (yellow card) 72'; Galindo (yellow card) 51'; Peralta 58'; Crosas (yellow card) 88'	Report	Bizera (yellow card) 41'; Venegas (yellow card) 77'; Paredes 87'; Guzmán (red card) 87' (manager)	Stadium: Estadio Corona; Referee: Luis Enrique Santander

March 16, 2013 Round 11	Atlas	1 – 2	Santos Laguna	Guadalajara, Jalisco
21:00	Vuoso (yellow card) 27'; Ayala (yellow card) 39'; Erpen (yellow card) 41'; Bravo 63' (pen.); Cufré (yellow card) 72'	Report	Gómez (yellow card) 22'; Quintero (yellow card) 41', (goal) 88'; Baloy (yellow card) 62'; Ramírez (yellow card) 74'; Salinas 79'	Stadium: Estadio Jalisco; Attendance: 37,510; Referee: Fabricio Morales

March 30, 2013 Round 12	Santos Laguna	1 – 1	Querétaro	Torreón, Coahuila
19:00	Peralta 37' (pen.), (yellow card) 56'; Mares (yellow card) 90+3'	Report	García (yellow card) 37'; Escoto (yellow card) 46'; Escalante (yellow card) 68'; Osuna (yellow card) 73' (yellow-red card) 76'; Oviedo (yellow card) 90'; Baloy 90+3'	Stadium: Estadio Corona; Attendance: 25,412; Referee: César Arturo Ramos

April 6, 2013 Round 13	Tijuana	0 – 0	Santos Laguna	Tijuana, Baja California
21:00		Report		Stadium: Estadio Caliente; Attendance: 23,133; Referee: José Alfredo Peñaloza

April 12, 2013 Round 14	Santos Laguna	2 – 1	Toluca	Torreón, Coahuila
19:30	Calderón (yellow card) 62'; Ibáñez 65'; Peralta 69'	Report	Lucas Silva 28'; Wilson Mathías (yellow card) 90'	Stadium: Estadio Corona; Referee: Erim Ramírez

April 19, 2013 Round 15	Santos Laguna	1 – 0	Monterrey	Torreón, Coahuila
21:30	Baloy 17'; Figueroa (yellow card) 46'; Peralta (yellow card) 83'; Crosas (yellow card) 84'	Report	Orozco (yellow card) 17'; Cardozo (yellow card) 42'; Basanta (yellow card) 67'; Hernández (yellow card) 84'	Stadium: Estadio Corona; Attendance: 24,716; Referee: Jorge Isaac Rojas

April 27, 2013 Round 16	Cruz Azul	1 – 0	Santos Laguna	Benito Juárez, Mexico City
17:00	Giménez 35'; Torrado (yellow card) 49'	Report	Salinas (yellow card) 39'; Gómez (yellow card) 41'; Ibáñez (yellow card) 44'	Stadium: Estadio Azul; Attendance: 30,144; Referee: Miguel Ángel Chacón

May 4, 2013 Round 17	Santos Laguna	1 – 2	Morelia	Torreón, Coahuila
19:00	Baloy (yellow card) 24'; Figueroa (yellow card) 45'; Quintero 61'; Sánchez (yellow card) 78'	Report	Mancilla 36'; Rojas 42'; Torres (yellow card) 75'	Stadium: Estadio Corona; Attendance: 24,639; Referee: José Alfredo Peñaloza

=== Final phase ===
May 9, 2013 Quarter-finals	Santos Laguna	0 – 0	Atlas	Torreón, Coahuila
19:00	Baloy (yellow card) 90'	Report	Erpen (yellow card) 58'; Ayala (yellow card) 69'	Stadium: Estadio Corona; Attendance: 19,856; Referee: César Arturo Ramos

May 12, 2013 Quarter-finals	Atlas	1 – 3	Santos Laguna	Guadalajara, Jalisco
20:00	Bravo 5'; Erpen (yellow card) 23'; Pinto (red card) 24'; Cufré (yellow card) 88'	Report	Rentería (yellow card) 6', (goal) 15'; Sánchez (yellow card) 7'; Cejas (yellow card) 21'; Gómez (yellow card) 43'; Quintero 62', 89'	Stadium: Estadio Jalisco; Attendance: 43,250; Referee: Jorge Antonio Pérez

Santos Laguna advanced 3–1 on aggregate

May 16, 2013 Semi-finals	Santos Laguna	0 – 3	Cruz Azul	Torreón, Coahuila
21:00	Baloy (yellow card) 86'; Quintero (yellow card) 90+2'	Report	Flores 2'; Barrera 24', (yellow card) 24'; Corona (yellow card) 79'; Giménez (yellow card) 88'; Figueroa 88' (o.g.); Domínguez (yellow card) 90+2'	Stadium: Estadio Corona; Attendance: 28,957; Referee: César Arturo Ramos

May 19, 2013 Semi-finals	Cruz Azul	2 – 1	Santos Laguna	Benito Juárez, Mexico City
20:00	Orozco 7', 24'; Torrado (yellow card) 31'; Vela (yellow card) 81' (yellow-red card) 90+1'	Report	Sánchez (yellow card) 25'; Baloy (yellow card) 37' (yellow-red card) 57'; Quintero (yellow card) 40' (yellow-red card) 51'; Rentería 36'; Rodríguez (yellow card) 41'; Figueroa (yellow card) 41'; Salinas (yellow card) 56'	Stadium: Estadio Azul; Attendance: 31,875; Referee: Marco Antonio Rodríguez

Cruz Azul advanced 5–1 on aggregate

=== Goalscorers ===
==== Regular season ====
Position	Nation	Name	Goals scored
1.	(Mexico)	Oribe Peralta	8
2.	(United States)	Herculez Gomez	4
2.	(Colombia)	Carlos Quintero	4
4.	(Mexico)	Rodolfo Salinas	2
5.	(Panama)	Felipe Baloy	1
5.	(Mexico)	César Ibáñez	1
TOTAL			20

==== Final phase ====
Position	Nation	Name	Goals scored
1.	(Colombia)	Carlos Quintero	2
2.	(Colombia)	Andrés Rentería	2
TOTAL			4

=== Results ===
==== Results summary ====
Overall								Home						Away					
Pld	W	D	L	GF	GA	GD	Pts	W	D	L	GF	GA	GD	W	D	L	GF	GA	GD
17	8	4	5	20	13	+7	28	6	1	2	12	6	+6	2	3	3	8	7	+1

Last updated: 4 May 2013.
Source: Clausura 2013 results

==== Results by round ====
Round	1	2	3	4	5	6	7	8	9	10	11	12	13	14	15	16	17
Ground	A	H	A	H	A	H	A	H	A	H	A	H	A	H	H	A	H
Result	D	W	L	W	D	L	D	W	W	W	W	D	D	W	W	L	L
Position	9	4	7	5	6	6	8	6	6	4	4	4	4	4	4	4	6

Updated to match(es) played on 5 May 2013. Source: Clausura 2013 results and mediotiempo.com
A = Away; H = Home; W = Win; D = Draw; L = Loss

== CONCACAF Champions League ==
=== Group stage ===
==== Group 1 ====
Team	Pld	W	D	L	GF	GA	GD	Pts	Qualification	SAN	TOR	ÁGU
(Mexico) Santos Laguna	4	4	0	0	13	1	+12	12	Advance to championship round		1–0	5–0
(Canada) Toronto FC	4	2	0	2	9	5	+4	6		1–3		5–1
(El Salvador) Águila	4	0	0	4	1	17	−16	0		0–4	0–3	

August 21, 2012	Santos Laguna (Mexico)	5–0	(El Salvador) Águila	Estadio Corona, Torreón
20:00	Quintero 6', 26', 47'; Lugo 30'; Ludueña 41'	Report		Attendance: 4,662; Referee: Edvin Jurisevic (United States)

August 28, 2012	Toronto FC (Canada)	1–3	(Mexico) Santos Laguna	BMO Field, Toronto
20:00	Amarikwa 68'	Report	Quintero 49'; Ludueña 90'; Ramírez 90+2'	Attendance: 10,951; Referee: Walter López (Guatemala)

September 19, 2012	Águila (El Salvador)	0–4	(Mexico) Santos Laguna	Estadio Cuscatlán, San Salvador
22:00		Report	Escoboza 49', 62'; Galindo 56'; Crosas 77' (pen.)	Attendance: 799; Referee: Henry Bejarano (Costa Rica)

October 24, 2012	Santos Laguna (Mexico)	1–0	(Canada) Toronto FC	Estadio Corona, Torreon
20:00	Gomez 73'	Report		Attendance: 7,478; Referee: Héctor Rodríguez (Honduras)

=== Championship round ===
Seeding was performed after the Group Stage. Santos was seed number two and faced Houston Dynamo the seventh seed in the quarterfinals. Santos won 3–1 on aggregate and advanced to the semis to face Seattle Sounders FC. Santos then advanced to the Finals defeating the Sounders 2–1 on aggregate. In the finals they will face their league rival Monterrey.

==== Quarterfinals ====
March 5, 2013
19:00 CDT
First leg

Houston Dynamo (United States)	1 – 0	(Mexico) Santos Laguna
Garcia (yellow card) 84'; Daivs 89'	Report	Baloy (yellow card) 78'

BBVA Compass Stadium, Houston, Texas
Attendance: 17,454
Referee: Roberto Moreno (Panama)

March 13, 2013
19:00 CDT
Second leg

Santos Laguna (Mexico)	3 - 0	(United States) Houston Dynamo
Rodríguez 23'; Gómez 28'; Salinas (yellow card) 30'; Crosas 76'	Report	Creavalle (yellow card) 21'

Estadio Corona, Torreon, Mexico
Attendance: 27,563
Referee: Enrico Wijngaarde

==== Semifinals ====
April 2, 2013
19:00 PDT
First leg

Seattle Sounders FC (United States)	0–1	(Mexico) Santos Laguna
	Report	Rodríguez (yellow card) 18'; Gómez 54'

CenturyLink Field, Seattle, Washington, United States
Attendance: 21,057
Referee: Héctor Rodríguez (Honduras)

April 9, 2013
17:00 PDT
Second leg

Santos Laguna (Mexico)	1–1	(United States) Seattle Sounders FC
Quintero 20'	Report	Scott (yellow card) 19'; Rosales (yellow card) 66'; Neagle 73'

Estadio TSM Corona, Torreón, Mexico
Referee: Joel Aguilar (El Salvador)

=== Finals ===
Team 1	Agg.	Team 2	1st leg	2nd leg
Santos Laguna (Mexico)	2–4	(Mexico) Monterrey	0–0	2–4

April 24, 2013
21:00 UTC−5
First leg

Santos Laguna (Mexico)	0 – 0	(Mexico) Monterrey
Qunitero (yellow card) 8'; Lugo (yellow card) 23'; Estrada (yellow card) 25'	Report	Zavala (yellow card) 17'; Suazo (yellow card) 19'; Delgado (red card) 65'

Estadio Corona, Torreón, Mexico
Attendance: 21,401
Referee: Roberto García (Mexico)

May 1, 2013
21:00 UTC−5
Second leg

Monterrey (Mexico)	4 – 2	(Mexico) Santos Laguna
Basanta (yellow card) 31'; Solís (yellow card) 43'; Madrigal (yellow card) 47' de Nigris 60', 87', (yellow card) 87'; Cardozo 84'; Suazo (yellow card) 86', (goal) 90+1'	Report	Baloy (yellow card) 35', (goal) 50'; Quintero 38'; Gómez (yellow card) 63'; Peralta (yellow card) 85'

Estadio Tecnológico, Monterrey, Mexico
Attendance: 33,667
Referee: Marco Rodríguez (Mexico)
