= Alberto Soto =

Alberto Soto may refer to:

- Alberto Soto (footballer, born 1990), Mexican football defender
- Alberto Soto (footballer, born 2001), Spanish football midfielder
