= 2010 Primera División de México Apertura Liguilla =

2010 Primera División de México
Tournament details
- Country: Mexico
- Teams: 8

Final positions
- Champions: Monterrey
- Runner-up: Santos Laguna

Tournament statistics
- Matches played: 14
- Goals scored: 40 (2.86 per match)
- Top goal scorer(s): Humberto Suazo (5 goals)

The Liguilla (English: Mini League) of the 2010 Primera División de México Apertura was a final knockout tournament involving eight teams of the Primera División de México. The tournament began on November 17, 2010, and concluded on December 5, 2010, with Monterrey beating Santos Laguna 5 – 3 on aggregate over two legs.

== Teams ==
The 18 teams that participated in the 2010 Apertura were divided into three groups of six teams. The top two in each group qualify automatically. The two best teams in the general table not already qualified, regardless of group, qualify as well.

S	Team	Manager	Captain	Performance at the Apertura 2010									
S	Team	Manager	Captain	Pld	W	D	L	GF	GA	GD	Pts	P	Qualified as
1	Cruz Azul	(Mexico) Enrique Meza	(Mexico) Gerardo Torrado	17	12	3	2	33	13	+20	39	1st	First place Group 3
2	Monterrey	(Mexico) Víctor Vucetich	(Mexico) Luis Ernesto Pérez	17	9	5	3	29	20	+9	32	2nd	First place Group 1
3	Santos Laguna	(Argentina) Rubén Omar Romano	(Mexico) Oswaldo Sánchez	17	9	3	5	29	19	+11	30	3rd	Runner-up Group 1
4	América	(Mexico) Manuel Lapuente	(Mexico) Pável Pardo	17	7	6	4	22	16	+6	27	4th	First place Group 2
5	San Luis	(Mexico) Ignacio Ambríz	(Mexico) Ignacio Torres	17	8	2	7	21	19	+2	26	5th	Runner-up Group 2
6	Chiapas	(Mexico) Jose Guadalupe Cruz	(Mexico) Christian Valdéz	17	6	7	4	21	14	+7	25	6th	Runner-up Group 3
7	Pachuca	(Argentina) Pablo Marini	(Colombia) Miguel Calero	17	7	4	6	27	28	−1	25	7th	Third place Group 2
8	UNAM	(Mexico) Guillermo Vázquez	(Mexico) Sergio Bernal	17	7	4	6	23	24	−1	25	8th	Third place Group 3

== Bracket ==
The eight qualified teams play two games against each other on a home-and-away basis. The winner of each match up is determined by aggregate score.

The teams were seeded one to eight in quarterfinals, and will be re-seeded one to four in semifinals, depending on their position in the general table. The higher seeded teams play on their home field during the second leg.

Quarterfinals
1	Cruz Azul	2	0	2
8	UNAM	1	2	3
2	Monterrey	1	3	4
7	Pachuca	1	3	4
3	Santos Laguna	1	1	2
6	Chiapas	1	0	1
4	América	0	4	4
5	San Luis	0	1	1

Semifinals
2	Monterrey	0	2	2
8	UNAM	0	0	0
3	Santos Laguna	2	3	5
4	América	1	3	4

Finals
2	Monterrey	2	3	5
3	Santos Laguna	3	0	3

- If the two teams are tied after both legs, the higher seeded team advances.
- Both finalist qualify to the 2011–12 CONCACAF Champions League. The champion qualifies directly to the group stage, while the runner-up qualifies to the preliminary round.

== Quarter-finals ==
The first legs of the quarterfinals were played on November 17 and 18. The second legs were played on November 20 and 21.

Team 1	Agg.	Team 2	1st leg	2nd leg
Cruz Azul (1)	2–3	(8) UNAM	2–1	0–2
Monterrey (2)	4–4	(7) Pachuca	1–1	3–3
Santos Laguna (3)	2–1	(6) Chiapas	1–1	1–0
América (4)	4–1	(5) San Luis	0–0	4–1

Kickoffs are given in local time (UTC-6).

=== First leg ===
November 17, 2010
19:00

San Luis	0 – 0	América
	Report

Estadio Alfonso Lastras
San Luis Potosí
Referee: Jaime Herrera Garduño (Mexico)

November 17, 2010
21:00

UNAM	1 – 2	Cruz Azul
López 19'	Report	Cervantes 32'; Giménez 73'

Estadio Olímpico Universitario
Mexico City
Referee: Mauricio Morales Ovalle (Mexico)

November 18, 2010
18:00

Pachuca	1 – 1	Monterrey
Arizala 67'	Report	Basanta 56'

Estadio Hidalgo
Pachuca
Referee: Paul Enrique Delgadillo Haro (Mexico)

November 18, 2010
20:00

Chiapas	1 – 1	Santos Laguna
Ochoa 33'	Report	Arce 22'

Estadio Víctor Manuel Reyna
Tuxtla Gutiérrez
Referee: Jorge Eduardo Gasso Flores (Mexico)

=== Second leg ===
November 20, 2010
17:00

Cruz Azul	0 – 2	UNAM
	Report	Bravo 1'; Cacho 73' (pen.)

Estadio Azul
Mexico City
Referee: Marco Antonio Rodríguez (Mexico)

November 20, 2010
19:00

América	4 – 1	San Luis
Sánchez 15'; Matellán 24' (o.g.); Esqueda 45'; Vuoso 81'	Report	de la Torre 53'

Estadio Azteca
Mexico City
Referee: Francisco Chacón Gutiérrez (Mexico)

November 21, 2010
16:00

Monterrey	3 – 3	Pachuca
Suazo 19' de Nigris 36'; Cardozo 56'	Report	Arizala 15', 84', 89'

Estadio Tecnológico
Monterrey
Referee: Benito Archundia (Mexico)

November 21, 2010
18:00

Santos Laguna	1 – 0	Chiapas
Rodriguez 90+5' (pen.)	Report

Estadio Corona
Torreón
Referee: Roberto García Orozco (Mexico)

== Semi-finals ==
The first legs of the semifinals were played on November 25. The second legs were played on November 28.

Team 1	Agg.	Team 2	1st leg	2nd leg
Monterrey (2)	2–0	(8) UNAM	0–0	2–0
Santos Laguna (3)	5–4	(4) América	2–1	3–3

Kickoffs are given in local time (UTC-6).

=== First leg ===
November 25, 2010
19:00

América	1 – 2	Santos Laguna
Reyna 19'	Report	Quintero 9'; Benítez 89'

Estadio Azteca
Mexico City
Referee: Jaime Herrera Garduño (Mexico)

November 25, 2010
21:00

UNAM	0 – 0	Monterrey
	Report

Estadio Olímpico Universitario
Mexico City
Referee: Roberto García Orozco (Mexico)

=== Second leg ===
November 28, 2010
18:00

Santos Laguna	3 – 3	América
Quintero 2', 61'; Benítez 75'	Report	Sánchez 60'; Vuoso 66'; Esqueda 86'

Estadio Corona
Torreón
Referee: Francisco Chacón Gutiérrez (Mexico)

November 28, 2010
20:00

Monterrey	2 – 0	UNAM
Suazo 88'; Cardozo 89'	Report

Estadio Tecnológico
Monterrey
Referee: Marco Antonio Rodríguez (Mexico)

== Final ==
The first leg of the final was played on December 2. The second leg was played on December 5.

Team 1	Agg.	Team 2	1st leg	2nd leg
Monterrey (2)	5–3	(3) Santos Laguna	2–3	3–0

Kickoffs are given in local time (UTC-6).

=== First leg ===
December 2, 2010
20:00

Santos Laguna	3 – 2	Monterrey
Estrada 23'; Quintero 41'; Davino 85' (o.g.)	Report	Suazo 37'; Cardozo 54'

Estadio Corona
Torreón
Referee: Marco Antonio Rodríguez (Mexico)

=== Second leg ===
December 5, 2010
18:00

Monterrey	3 – 0	Santos Laguna
Suazo 28', 85'; Basanta 72'	Report

Estadio Tecnológico
Monterrey
Referee: Benito Archundia (Mexico)
