= Agustín Herrera =

Mexican footballer (born 1985)

Personal information
- Full name: Agustín Enrique Herrera Osuna
- Date of birth: 22 March 1985 (age 41)
- Place of birth: Los Mochis, Sinaloa, Mexico
- Height: 1.75 m (5 ft 9 in)
- Position: Forward

Team information
- Current team: Santos Laguna U-19 (Assistant)

Senior career*
| Years | Team | Apps | (Gls) |
| 2005–2010 | Santos Laguna | 45 | (10) |
| 2010 | Mérida | 15 | (4) |
| 2011 | Atlante UTN | 9 | (0) |
| 2011 | Veracruz | 10 | (0) |
| 2012 | Sinaloa | 8 | (2) |
| 2013 | Altamira | 16 | (2) |
| 2013–2014 | Coatepeque | 41 | (20) |
| 2014–2016 | Comunicaciones | 140 | (54) |
| 2016–2019 | Antigua | 164 | (89) |
| 2019–2021 | Comunicaciones | 66 | (32) |
| 2021 | Cobán Imperial | 16 | (2) |
| 2022 | Mixco | 17 | (4) |

Managerial career
- 2024–: Santos Laguna Reserves and Academy
- * Club domestic league appearances and goals as of 8 December 2022

Agustín Enrique Herrera Osuna (born 22 March 1985) is a former Mexican professional footballer who played as a forward.

== Club career ==
=== Santos Laguna ===
Herrera made his professional debut on January 22, 2006, in a 1–0 loss to Pumas UNAM. He scored his first professional goal on March 4, 2007. He came off the bench to score in the 84th minute, as Santos defeated Monarcas Morelia, 2–1.

Agustin has seen minimal playing time for Santos, often overshadowed by the talent of Vicente Matías Vuoso and Carlos Darwin Quintero. However, he has become a key player for Santos in the CONCACAF Champions League, playing in four games and scoring five goals, including a hat-trick against C.S.D. Municipal.

== Honours ==
Santos Laguna

- Mexican Primera División: Clausura 2008

Comunicaciones

- Liga Nacional de Guatemala: Apertura 2014, Clausura 2015

Antigua

- Liga Nacional de Guatemala: Apertura 2017, Apertura 2018, Clausura 2019

Mixco

- Primera División de Ascenso: Clausura 2022

Individual

- Liga Nacional de Guatemala Top scorer: Clausura 2017, Clausura 2018, Apertura 2018, Clausura 2019
