= Darwin Quintero =

Colombian footballer (born 1987)

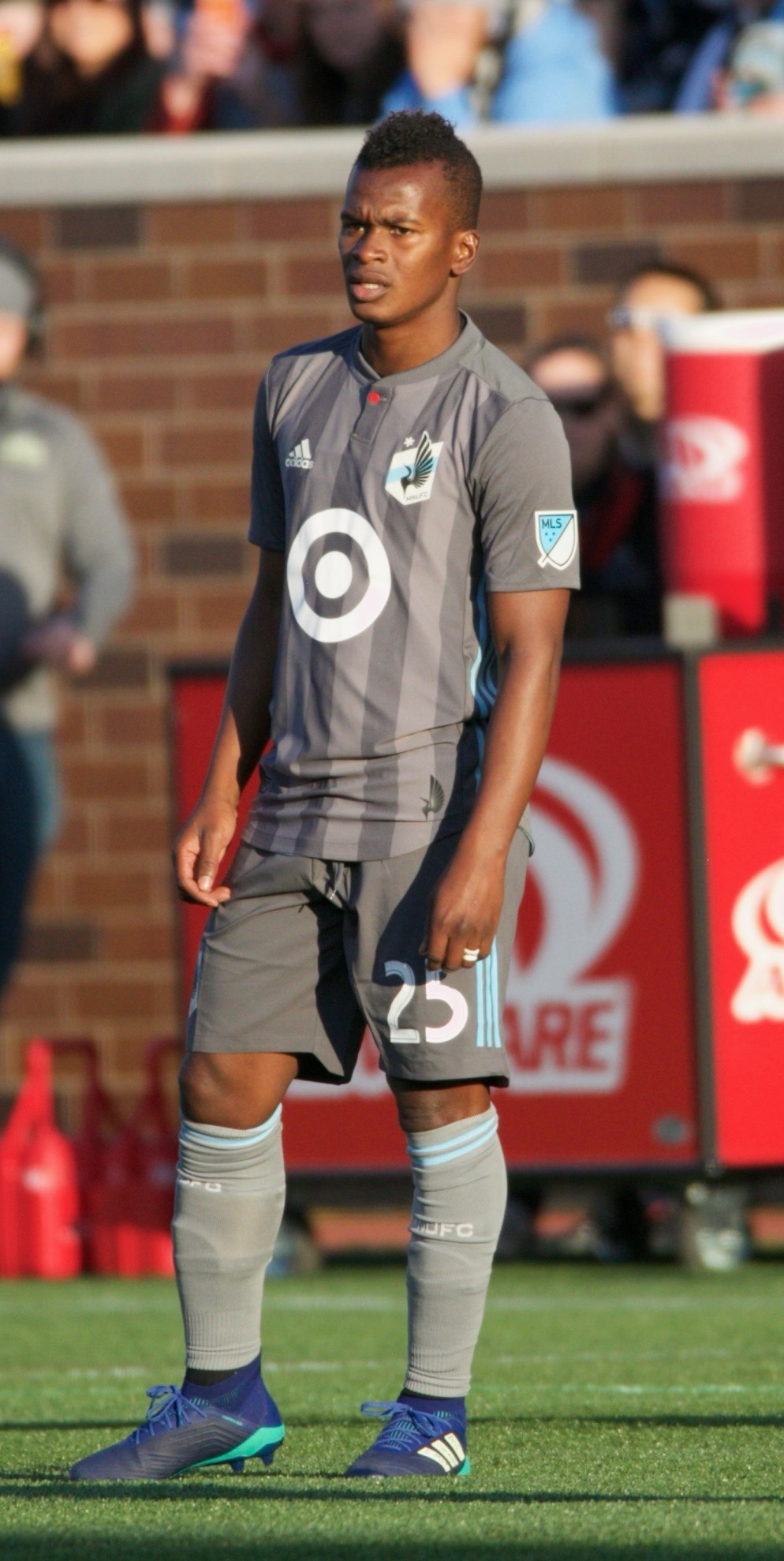
- Quintero playing for Minnesota United FC in 2018

Personal information
- Full name: Carlos Darwin Quintero Villalba
- Date of birth: 19 September 1987 (age 39)
- Place of birth: Tumaco, Colombia
- Height: 1.65 m (5 ft 5 in)
- Position: Attacking midfielder

Team information
- Current team: Millonarios
- Number: 25

Youth career
- 2004–2005: Deportes Tolima

Senior career*
Years	Team	Apps	(Gls)
2006–2007	Deportes Tolima	55	(24)
2007–2008	Krylia Sovetov	11	(1)
2008	→ Deportivo Pereira (loan)	12	(4)
2008	Deportivo Pereira	22	(13)
2009–2014	Santos Laguna	225	(66)
2014–2018	América	107	(17)
2018–2019	Minnesota United	57	(21)
2020–2022	Houston Dynamo	73	(18)
2023	América de Cali	42	(5)
2024–2025	Deportivo Pereira	68	(20)
2026–	Millonarios	12	(0)

International career^{‡}
2008–2012	Colombia	14	(1)
- * Club domestic league appearances and goals as of 16 April 2026 ‡ National team caps and goals as of 15 October 2013

Carlos Darwin Quintero Villalba (born 19 September 1987) is a Colombian professional footballer who plays as an attacking midfielder for Categoría Primera A club Millonarios. Quintero is also known by his nickname of El Científico del Gol (The Goal Scientist). He can play in various roles like striker, winger, second striker and attacking midfielder. His main attributes throughout his career have been his pace, creativity, and dribbling ability.

== Club career ==
=== Early career and Deportes Tolima ===
Quintero began his career with Panadería Kuty training school and Barsa Fútbol Club. His mentor Élkin Congote tried to find a better situation for Quintero to develop and set up trials with more prestigious youth teams in Cali, Carlos Sarmiento Lora School and Selección Valle, as well as Boca Juniors, but they all rejected him. Quintero did catch the attention of Humberto Ortiz, a former top flight coach and now a scout for Categoría Primera A club Deportes Tolima. Tolima and Ortiz negotiated with Barsa and Quintero joined the youth ranks of Tolima in 2004. Quintero was part of Jorge Luis Bernal's Tolima youth side that won gold for men's football at the 2004 National Games of Colombia.

Quintero made his first team debut at the age of 18 on 18 September 2005 in a 1–0 defeat to Atlético Junior. That would be his only first team appearance of the year. In 2006, after being placed on a special vitamin supplement and workout routine to help Quintero bulk up, he was called up to the Tolima first team, which was now managed by Quintero's former youth coach Jorge Luis Bernal. He scored his first goal on 19 February 2006 in a 3–1 win over Boyacá Chicó. Quintero scored his first career hat-trick on 26 February in a 7–3 victory against Envigado. He went on to score 19 times in 42 appearances in his first full season. Quintero and Tolima finished the Campeonato Finalización top of the table, but they lost in the final 2–1 on aggregate to Cúcuta Deportivo. Quintero also made his debut in continental football in 2006, first appearing and scoring in the Copa Sudamericana on 22 August in a 3–1 win over Independiente Medellín in the first leg of the first stage, with Tolima eventually qualifying to the next stage 4–2 on aggregate. He would score again on 21 September to give Tolima a 2–2 draw with Mineros de Guayana, with Tolima advancing on away goals. Tolima would advance to the Round of 16 before falling to eventual champions Pachuca.

2007 saw Quintero make his Copa Libertadores debut on 7 March, with Quintero scoring once to give Tolima an important 1–0 win over Cerro Porteño. In the final match of the group against Cúcuta Deportivo, Quintero scored once, but it was not enough as Tolima lost 4–3 in Ibagué, and with this result Tolima were eliminated by finishing third in the group. Quintero and Tolima did not enjoy a successful 2007 Campeonato Apertura, finishing 12th and failing to qualify for the playoffs.

=== Krylia Sovetov ===
In July 2007, Quintero joined Russian Premier League side FC Krylia Sovetov Samara along with fellow Colombian and Tolima teammate Juan Carlos Escobar. He made his debut for Krylia Sovetov on 11 August, coming on as a substitute in a 2–0 defeat to Spartak Moscow. He scored his first goal for the club on 28 October in a 3–0 win over Rubin Kazan. It was a rough season for Quintero, who only scored one goal and only played 434 minutes. The season was rough for Krylia Sovetov as well, finishing in 13th place and tied on points with relegated side Kuban Krasnodar.

=== Deportivo Pereira ===
In 2008, Leonid Slutsky took over as the head coach for Krylia Sovetov and sent Quintero to Colombia on loan with an option to buy to Primera A club Deportivo Pereira for the first half of the Russian Premier League season. Quintero scored his first goal for Pereira on 6 April in a 4–1 defeat to América de Cali. A week later, he scored twice in a 5–2 win over Deportivo Pasto. Quintero ended the Torneo Apertura with 4 goals from 12 appearances and was voted as the best player in the team by a fan poll on the club website.

Quintero returned to Samara at the end of May. He trained with Krylia Sovetov for two weeks, but Slutsky did not see a place for him in the team, and he officially left the club on 23 June. Atlético Nacional came close to signing him, with an agreement in place between Krylia Sovetov, Nacional, and Quintero. However Quintero would end up returning to Deportivo Pereira after they decided to exercise their option to buy that was part of the loan agreement.

After Pereira had finished bottom of the Apertura table, Luis Fernando Suárez came in as the new manager. On 24 August, Quintero scored his first goal of the Torneo Finalización to give Pereira a 3–2 win over Millonarios. He would find the back of the net twice on 14 September to give Pereira a 2–0 win over Cúcuta Deportivo. 10 days later, Quintero would score in the 90th minute to give Deportive Pereira a 2–1 win over Junior. Suárez and Quintero helped Deportivo Pereira finish the Torneo Finalización in the top eight of the table and finish one spot above the relegation playoffs in the relegation table, which takes into account performance over the past three seasons. Now in the Torneo Finalización playoffs, Quintero scored a brace against Junior to give Pereira a 3–2 win over Junior. In the 4th match, he scored a hat trick to help Pereira defeat Deportivo Cali 3–1. However, Pereira finished second in the group, failing to advance to the finals. Quintero ended the season with 13 goals in 22 games and was rated as the best player of the season. Quintero's 13 goals gave him the second highest goal tally for the finalización, trailing only Fredy Montero's 16.

=== Santos Laguna ===
In December 2008, Quintero joined Santos Laguna of the Mexican Primera División for a transfer fee over $4 million.

==== 2008–09 season ====
He made his debut for Santos on 18 January 2009 in the first match of the Clausura, playing all 90 minutes in a 2–1 defeat against Club América. Quintero started the first two matches of the season due to an injury to star Ecuadorian striker Christian Benítez. After he failed to score in his first 4 matches, there was some media criticism of his lack of goals, but he was praised for his work rate. On 15 February Quintero scored his first goal for Los Guerreros in a 2–1 victory over Chivas. He made his first appearance in the CONCACAF Champions League on 25 February, coming on as a substitute in a 2–0 defeat to the Montreal Impact in the first leg of the quarterfinals. In the return leg of the CCL quarterfinals, Santos found themselves trailing the Impact 4–3 on aggregate as they entered stoppage time. In the 90+1st minute, Quintero scored a goal to level the aggregate score at 4, however Santos still trailed on away goals; but Quintero scored again in the 90+3rd minute to put Los Guerreros up 5–4 on aggregate and into the semifinals. Two weeks later, he scored twice to give Santos a 2–1 victory over Atlante in the first leg of the CCL semifinals. In the second leg with Atlante on 8 April, Quintero assisted Vicente Matías Vuoso's goal to put Santos up 3–2 on aggregate in the 70th minute, however two late goals saw Atlante come back and advance to the final. Santos and Quintero failed to qualify for Liguilla, but he enjoyed a solid debut season, scoring 8 and assisting 2 in 20 appearances across all competitions.

==== 2009–10 season ====
Quintero made his first appearance of the 2009–10 season in a North American SuperLiga match on 28 June 2009. Quintero came on as a substitute in the second half and helped Santos secure a 3–1 win over the Kansas City Wizards in the final match of the group stage. He would play the full 90 minutes and score once in the semifinal with Tigres, however Los Guerreros would fall by the score of 3–2. He made his first Primera División appearance of the season in the first match of the Apertura on 26 July, a 1–1 draw with Monarcas Morelia. He picked up his first goal of the Apertura campaign on 16 August in a 3–2 win over Cruz Azul. Quintero ended the Apertura with 3 goals and 5 assists and helped Santos qualify for the Liguilla. Santos were defeated by Morelia in the first round, losing 4–2 over the two legs.

In the opening match of the 2010 Clausura, Quintero came off the bench and scored to help Santos record a 3–2 victory over Morelia. He scored in three consecutive games from matchweek 9 to 11, with Santos winning all three games. On 19 April, he scored and assisted another as Los Verdiblancos defeated San Luis 2–1. Quintero scored 6 times and assisted for 4 goals as Santos qualified for Liguilla. He picked up an assist in the first leg of the quarterfinals as Santos went on to defeat Pumas 2–1 over two legs. Quintero had another assist in the first leg of the semifinals and scored for himself in leg two as Los Guerreros defeated Morelia 10–4 on aggregate. He scored again in the first leg of the final, but Santos would lose on penalties after the second leg, with Toluca winning their 10th league title in club history.

==== 2010–11 season ====
Quintero opened the 2010–11 season in strong form, scoring once and assisting three times in the first three games of the Apertura. He then entered a patch of bad form, failing to score and only picking up one assist the rest of the season. Despite Quintero's struggles, Santos still managed to qualify for Liguilla, where Quintero came alive. After a quiet quarterfinals against Chiapas, Quintero scored 3 times over two legs to help Santos advance past Club América by an aggregate score of 5–4. He would score again against Monterrey to give Santos a 3–2 win in the first leg of the final, but Rayados would win the return leg 3–0 to take the championship.

Quintero started the Clausura strong, scoring and assisting in the opening match, a 2–1 win over Atlante on 8 January. On 2 April, Quintero scored once and recorded an assist in a 3–0 win against Cruz Azul. Quintero was sent off in the 71st minute after headbutting Christian Giménez. Quintero alleged that Giménez pushed him after another Cruz Azul player, Rogelio Chávez, had called Quintero an "ape", sparking his reaction. While Chávez admitted to a verbal altercation with Quintero, he denied using any racist insults. Quintero received a 6 match suspension after the incident, three matches for violent conduct and then another three matches for further aggression towards an opponent after being sent off. Three days later, the suspension was reduced to four matches. He returned from his suspension on 29 April against Estudiantes Tecos, picking up an assist in the 3–1 victory. Quintero had 3 goals and 3 assists in the Clausura, however Santos failed to qualify for Liguilla. In the 2010–11 CONCACAF Champions League Quintero scored 3 goals in 7 appearances, helping Santos advance to the quarterfinals, where they lost to Cruz Azul by an aggregate score of 5–1.

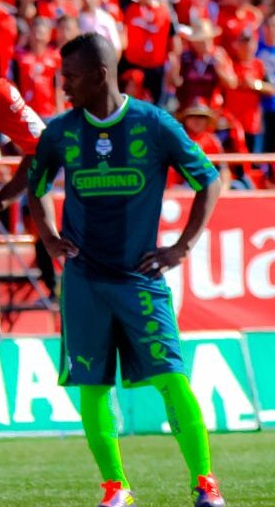
Quintero during the 2012 Clausura

==== 2011–12 season ====
Before the start of the 2011 Apertura, Quintero changed his jersey number from 28 to 3 due to his son being born on 3 March. He made his first appearance of the Apertura in matchweek 1, coming off the bench and picking up an assist in a 4–1 win over Pachuca on 23 July. In matchweek 2, he scored his first goal of the campaign and picked up another assist as Los Guerreros defeated Atlante 3–0. On 26 October, he scored in a 1–1 draw with Club América, bringing his goal involvement to 6 in his last 6 games. Quintero ended the Apertura with 5 goals from 17 games as he helped Santos qualify for Liguilla. He had one assist in the first leg and a goal in the second to help see Santos past Chiapas and into the semifinals, where they advanced past Morelia. In the first leg of the final with Tigres, Los Guerreros were unable to have much success and lost 1–0, with Quintero being substituted at half time. In the second leg, Quintero was replaced after 15 minutes due to goalkeeper Oswaldo Sánchez receiving a red card. Santos would go on to lose the game 3–1, falling short in the final once again.

Quintero scored his first goal of the 2012 Clausura in matchweek 4, a 3–1 win over Club Tijuana. Quintero ended the season in good form, scoring 5 and adding 2 assists in his last 6 games of the regular season, bringing his Clausura total up to 6 goals and 4 assists in 14 appearances. His strong performances throughout the tournament helped Santos qualify for Liguilla as the first seed. In their quarterfinal matchup with Chiapas, Quintero scored a goal in each leg, including a 96th-minute winner in the first leg at Estadio Víctor Manuel Reyna, as Los Guerreros advanced with an aggregate score of 6–4. The club matched up with Tigres in the semifinal, a rematch of the 2011 Apertura final. In the first leg of the semifinals, Quintero had one assist as Santos could only manage a draw. In the second leg, Tigres jumped out to an early 2 goal lead, putting them up 3–1 on aggregate. However, in the 87th minute Quintero assisted Oribe Peralta to put the game at 2–1, and two minutes later he assisted Peralta again to level the score on aggregate and dramatically send Santos to the final. Although the scores were level on aggregate, Santos advanced because they were the higher seed. In the first leg of the final, Santos and Monterrey played to a 1 all draw. In the second leg, Quintero assisted Daniel Ludueña for the opening goals of the game; Santos was able to hold on and win the match 2–1 to win their fourth league title in club history.

Santos also enjoyed a deep run in the 2011–12 CONCACAF Champions League, reaching the final where they lost 3–2 to Monterrey on aggregate, with Quintero picking up assists on 2 of the goals for Santos. He scored 4 goals and had 4 assists in 8 appearances during the tournament. One of those assists came on 8 March 2012, with Quintero helping Santos to a 1–1 draw at Toronto FC. The night was best remembered for what occurred after the match, when Quintero got a red card by getting in an altercation with Toronto defender Ashtone Morgan, prompting both benches to run onto the pitch.

==== 2012–13 season ====
Quintero made his first appearance of the 2012 Apertura on 21 July, scoring once in a 2–1 win over San Luis. On 29 July, Quintero scored in the 89th minute to give Los Guerreros a 1–0 victory over Guadalajara. On 1 September Quintero scored twice to help Santos defeat Tigres 3–1. He ended the Apertura with 7 goals, the most on the team, however Santos failed to qualify for Liguilla, finishing level on points with Guadalajara, but missing out due to a worse goal differential. On 16 March 2013, now in the Torneo Clausura, Quintero recorded a late assist and scored in the 89th minute to give Santos a dramatic victory over Atlas. He finished the tournament with 4 goals and helped Santos return to Liguilla. In the quarterfinals, after a scoreless first leg, Quintero scored twice in the second leg with Atlas to give Santos a 3–1 victory. However they were eliminated by Cruz Azul in the semifinals, with Quintero being sent off in the second leg.

Quintero made his first appearance of the 2012–13 CONCACAF Champions League on 21 August 2012, scoring a hat-trick in a 5–0 victory over Club Águila in the first match of the group stage. In their next match, he would find the back of the net again to help Santos to a 3–1 victory over Toronto. After losing the first leg of the quarterfinals away to the Houston Dynamo 1–0, Santos responded with a 3–0 win in leg two to advance to the semifinals, where they were drawn with Seattle Sounders. Santos won the first leg 1–0 at CenturyLink Field, with Quintero assisting Herculez Gomez's goal and being named man of the match. In the return leg Santos managed a 1–1 draw with Quintero scoring to help send Los Guerreros to their second consecutive CCL final, facing Monterrey once again. After a scoreless first leg, Quintero opened the scoring in leg two with a goal in the 38th minute. With Santos up 2–1, Quintero was subbed off in the 82nd minute. Soon after Monterrey would level the score at 2 in the 83rd minute, before taking the lead in the 86th. Rayados would add on another goal in stoppage time to defeat Santos 4–2, defeating Santos in consecutive CCL finals and taking their third consecutive Champions league title. Quintero's 6 goals in the tournament saw him tie for the golden boot with Nicolas Muñoz.

==== 2013–14 season ====
Ahead of the 2013–14 season, Quintero signed a new contract with Santos Laguna that lasted until 2016. He made his first appearance of the season on 23 July in a Copa MX match against Club Atlético Zacatepec, scoring once in a 3–0 win. The Apertura 2013 Copa MX was Quintero's first time competing in the Copa MX as the tournament had not been played from 1996 to 2012 and teams who were competing in a continental competition did not participate. In Santos's next Copa MX match, Quintero scored twice to help Los Guerreros record a 3–3 draw with Zacatepec. He scored a brace in the final match of the group stage, a 3–2 win over Tigres, but it was not enough as Santos failed to advance out of the group. Quintero's 5 goals saw him finish as the second highest scorer of the tournament.

He made his first appearance of the 2013 Apertura on 31 July in a 1–1 draw with Puebla. Quintero had a slow start to the campaign, not scoring in his first 9 appearances and not recording an assist in his first 6, but he had a strong finish to the season, ending the Apertura with 3 goals and 9 assists in 16 appearances to help Santos qualify for Liguilla. His 9 assists were the most for the Apertura. In the first leg of the quarterfinals with Querétaro, Quintero scored two and assisted for a third as Santos defeated Los Gallos Blancos 3–2. In the second leg he scored two more to give Santos a 3–1 victory and an aggregate score of 6–3. In the semifinals, Quintero was unable to keep up his prolific scoring as Santos lost to Club León, the eventual champions. Quintero scored his first goal of the 2014 Clausura and picked up an assist on 14 February to give Santos a 3–2 win against Club Tijuana. On 13 April Quintero scored a hat trick to help Santos defeat Atlante 4–3. He ended the Clausura with 6 goals and 8 assists, playing in all 17 games. He once again topped the Liga MX assist charts. During the Liguilla quarterfinals, Quintero scored once in the first leg as Santos lost to América 5–3 . However, they would win the return leg 3–1, advancing on away goals. Santos would lose to Pachuca in the first leg of the semifinals 2–0. Quintero had one assist in the return leg to help Santos respond with a 4–2 win, but it was not enough as Pachuca advanced on away goals.

Santos Laguna and Quintero also qualified for the 2014 Copa Libertadores as the best team from the 2013 Apertura that failed to qualify for the CONCACAF Champions League. Quintero made his first appearance in the tournament on 11 February 2014, the first match of the group stage, where he assisted Peralta's goal as Santos defeated Arsenal de Sarandí 1–0. On 25 March Quintero scored twice, assisted for two more, and scored as Los Guerreros defeated Peñarol 4–1, securing Santos's place in the round of 16. Santos were upset by Lanús in the round of 16 by an aggregate score of 4–1, with the 1 goal being scored by Quintero.

==== 2014–15 season ====
On 17 August Quintero scored his first goal of the 2014 Apertura, finding the back of the net in the 88th minute to give Santos a 1–0 away win against Guadalajara. He scored again in their next league match, a 3–0 win over Toluca. Quintero ended the Apertura with 2 goals and 9 assists in 17 appearances. However that wasn't enough as Santos finished in 9th place, finishing one point behind Tigres in the last Liguilla spot.

During the Apertura 2014 Copa MX final, Quintero assisted Néstor Calderón to put Santos up 2–1. Quintero was subbed off in the 87th minute, but soon after Puebla responded to level the score at two. Santos managed to prevail in penalties, winning their first Copa MX in club history.

On 26 November 2014, it was reported that Quintero had requested to leave Santos, citing the need for new challenges and experiences. On 28 November Santos Laguna vice-president Alberto Canedo Macouzet confirmed that Quintero had requested to leave. At the time of his transfer, Quintero's 277 appearances across all competitions for Santos was the seventh most all time, his 92 goals in all competitions were the fourth most in club history, his 21 goals scored in continental competitions were the most in club history, and his 82 assists in all competitions were the second most in club history.

=== Club América ===
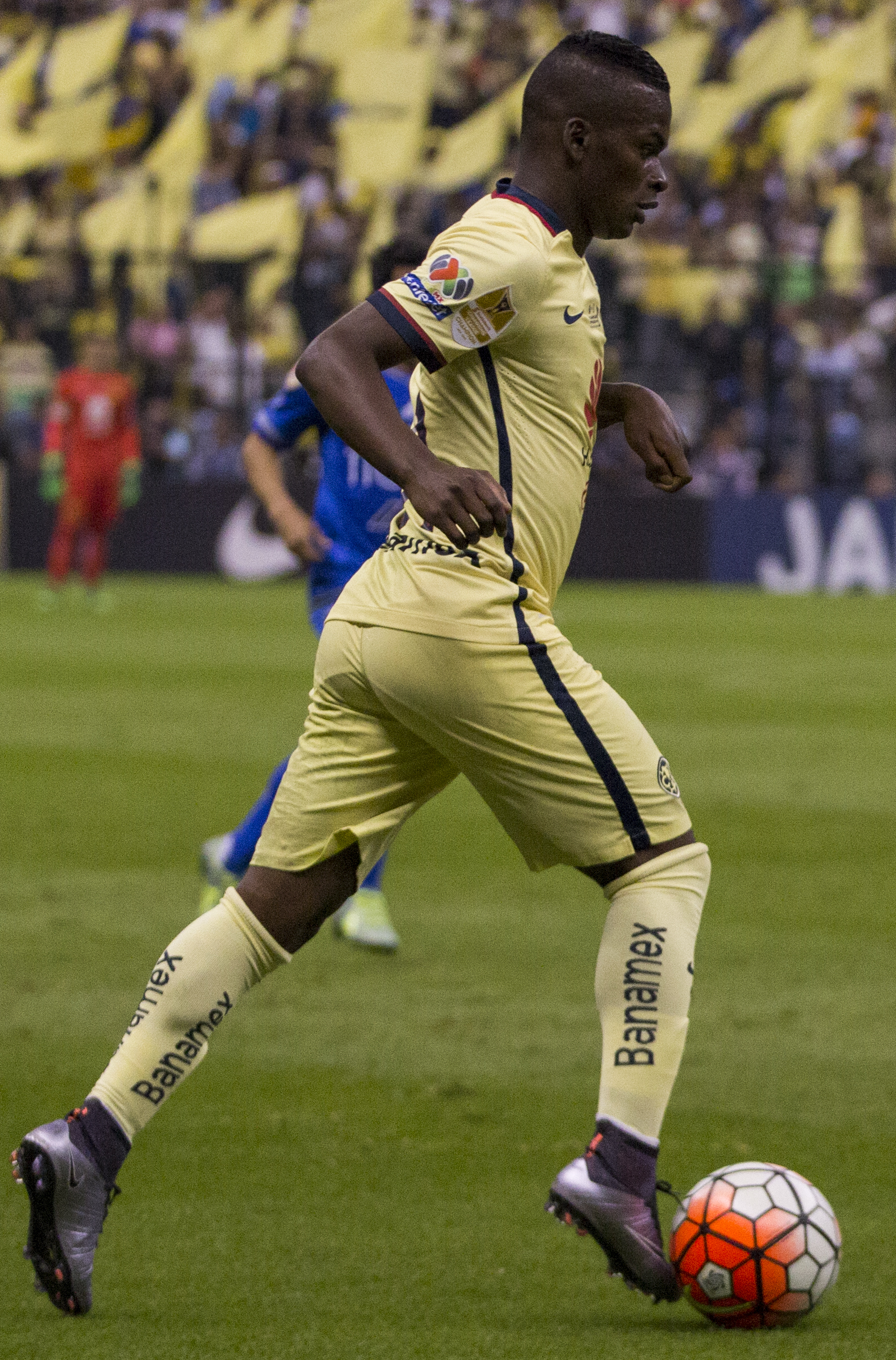
Quintero playing for Club América in the 2015–16 CONCACAF Champions League Final

On 16 December 2014 Quintero signed with Club América. The transfer fee was reportedly $10.3 million, breaking the Liga MX transfer record. He was unveiled to the press on 19 December along with fellow new signings Cristian Pellerano, Miguel Samudio, and Darío Benedetto.

==== 2014–15 season ====
On 10 January, Quintero made his debut for Las Águilas in the opening match of the 2015 Clausura, scoring once in a 3–2 win against León. He recorded his first assist for América on 31 January, setting up Benedetto for the only score of the game in a win over Tigres UANL. Quintero finished with only 1 goal and 2 assists in the Clausura, but helped América finish second and qualify for Liguilla. However, América and Quintero had a disappointing playoffs, losing in the first round to Pachuca.

América had a successful run during the 2014–15 CONCACAF Champions League. He made his first appearance of the tournament on 25 February 2015, in the first leg of the quarterfinals with Deportivo Saprissa, picking up an assist in a 3–0 win. América would win the return leg comfortably 2–0. They would run into trouble in the semifinals, losing 3–0 in the first leg with C.S. Herediano. In the second leg, Quintero got things started early, tapping in a spilled ball by the Herediano goalkeeper in the 4th minute. Four minutes later, Quintero set up Darío Benedetto, who turned and fired the ball off the post and in. In the 19th minute, Quintero assisted Benedetto again to level the aggregate score at 3. América would go on to win 6–0 and advance. In the first leg of the final América and the Montreal Impact played to a one all draw. After falling behind early in the second leg, Quintero picked up 2 assists as Las Águilas scored four goals. The Impact would score once late, but it was too little too late as América won their sixth CONCACAF championship.

His final appearance of his debut season with América came on 20 July 2015, a 1–0 loss to Santos Laguna in the Campeón de Campeones.

==== 2015–16 season ====
Quintero made his first appearance of the 2015–16 season on 26 July, scoring once in a 4–2 defeat to Puebla in the opening game of the 2015 Apertura. Quintero ended the Apertura with 4 goals and 3 assists. In the quarterfinals of Liguilla, América advanced past Club León 5–3 on aggregate. After losing the first leg of the semifinals 3–0 to Pumas UNAM, Quintero scored two early goals in the second leg to bring América back into the fixture. Although they would win the second leg 3–1, Pumas advanced on aggregate 4–3.

On 13 December 2015, Quintero made his first career appearance in the FIFA Club World Cup, getting the start in a 2–1 defeat to Guangzhou Evergrande. He did not feature in the fifth place game, a 2–1 win over TP Mazembe.

Quintero got off to a slow start in the 2016 Clausura, only having one assist and zero goals in his first 7 appearances. After he served his suspension for a red card he received in matchweek 7, Quintero scored twice and added an assist as América defeated Morelia 4–1. Quintero ended the Apertura with 6 goals and 2 assists, with all 6 of the goals and 1 of the assists coming in the 5 games immediately following his suspension. In the quarterfinals of Liguilla, Quintero had the go ahead assist in the second leg to help América advance past Guadalajara. After getting a 1–0 win in the first leg of the semifinal, Monterrey won the return leg 4–2, eliminating América.

Quintero made his first appearance in the 2015–16 CONCACAF Champions League on 5 August 2015 in a 4–0 victory over C.D. Motagua in the opening match of the group stage. He picked up his first and second goal of the tournament on September 16, scoring twice in a 3–1 win against C.D. Walter Ferretti. In the first leg of the quarterfinal matchup with Seattle Sounders FC, Quintero scored once to help América secure a 2 all draw. In the second leg Quintero found the back of the net in the 42nd minute to level the aggregate score at 3. América would score two more goals to advance past the Sounders. América would advance past Santos Laguna 1–0 in extra time to set up a final against Tigres UANL. Although he did not feature in the first leg, Quintero returned to the starting lineup for leg two, as Las Águilas won their second consecutive CCL title.

==== 2016–17 season ====
Quintero made his first appearance of the season on 16 July, scoring once in a 2–0 win against Chiapas in the opening game of the 2016 Apertura. On 6 August, he scored once and recorded two assists to help América to a 4–1 win over Veracruz. On 3 September, it was announced that Quintero was suffering from thrombophlebitis in his right leg. The initial estimate was that he would be out for three to six months and miss the rest of the season. Quintero managed to return in time for the final match of the Apertura, recording two assists in a 3–3 draw with Pachuca on 19 November. During the Liguilla quarterfinals, Quintero had an assist in leg two to give América a 2–1 aggregate win over Guadalajara. After defeating Necaxa in the semifinals, América faced off with Tigres UANL in the final. Quintero came off the bench in the first leg, but did not feature in the second as Tigres won on penalties. At the 2016 FIFA Club World Cup, Quintero played in all 3 of América's games. They lost to Atlético Nacional on penalties in the third place game.

He made his first appearance of the 2017 Clausura in matchweek one, coming on as a substitute in a 2–1 defeat to Toluca on 15 January. On 18 March, Quintero was playing in a match with the under–20 team when he suffered a leg injury. He returned to the first team lineup for matchweek 15. He made three substitute appearances for the final three matches. The Clausura season was a disappointment for Quintero and América. Quintero scored zero goals and had two assists in his league 13 appearances, with only three of those being starts, as América failed to qualify for Liguilla.

==== 2017–18 season ====
Quintero made his first appearance of the 2017–18 season on 16 July, coming on as a substitute in a 2–0 loss to Querétaro in the Supercopa MX. On 22 July, he made his first appearance of the 2017 Apertura in a 1–0 loss to Querétaro. He recorded his first assist of the season on 5 August in a 2–1 victory over Pumas. His first goal of the Apertura came on 19 August, scoring once and assisting for another as Las Águilas defeated Lobos BUAP 3–2. The Apertura season saw improvement from the 2017 Clausura for Quintero and América. Quintero finished with 2 goals and 4 assists to help América qualify for Liguilla, where they reached the semifinals.

Quintero made his first appearance of the 2018 Clausura on 7 January, recording an assist in a 1–0 over Querétaro. During a training session on 23 January, Quintero tried to shoot a ball at a reporter who was on live TV. Although Quintero denied that his intention was to hit the reporter, América announced they would sanction him internally. After missing three matches, Quintero came off the bench in a 4–1 win against Morelia on 13 February. On 14 March, Quintero had an assist in a 3–1 win over Tauro in the second leg of the CCL quarterfinals, with América advancing 7–1 aggregate score. The match would end up being his final appearance for the club. His time with América was mixed with success and disappointment. He helped the club win trophies, but was also seen as not living up to his price tag, as fans were critical of his inconsistency. He was even booed off the pitch at times by América fans.

=== Minnesota United ===
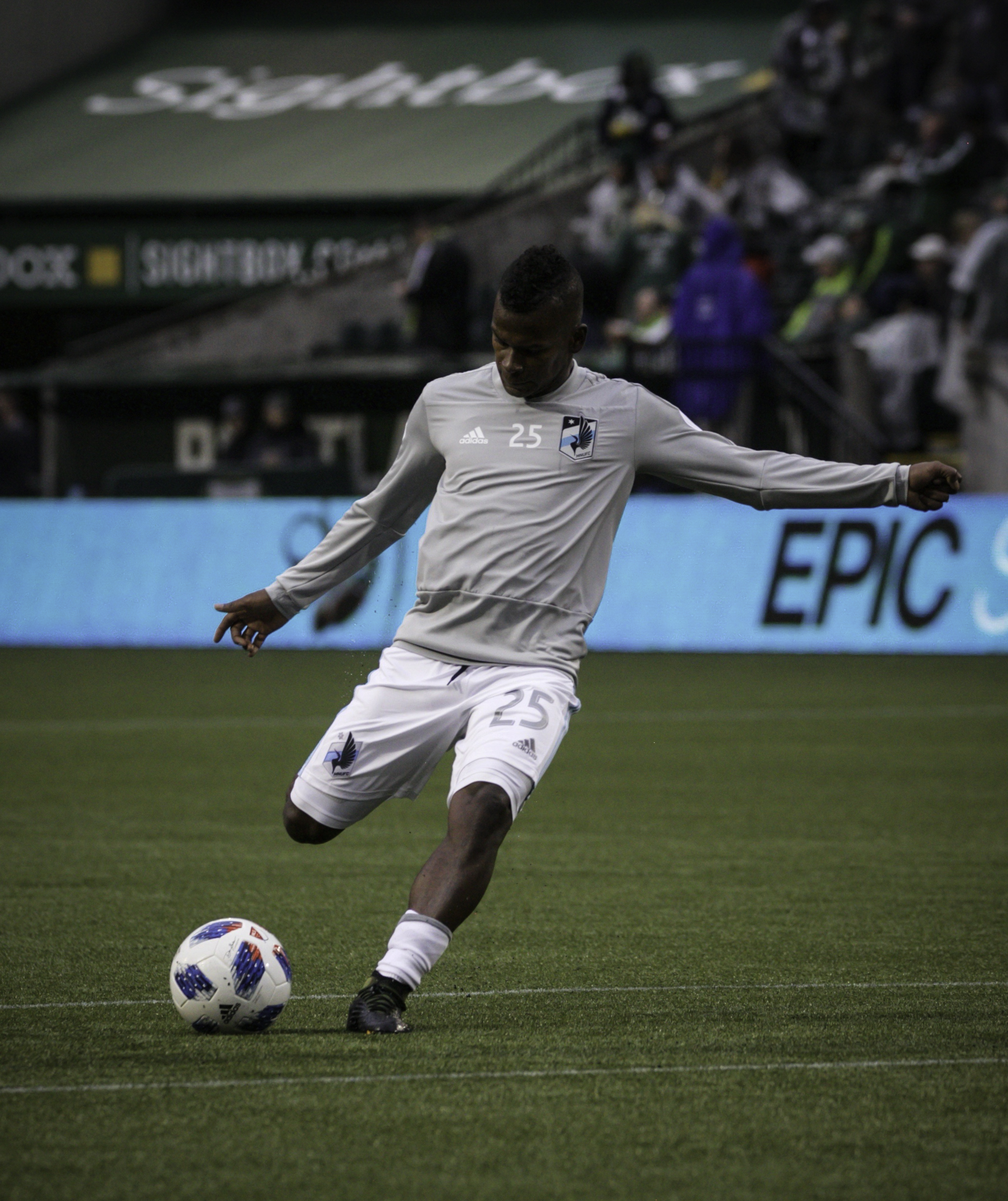
Quintero warming up prior to his Minnesota United debut on 14 April 2018

On March 31, 2018, Quintero joined Major League Soccer side Minnesota United FC as a Designated Player, the first in the club's history. The transfer fee paid was reported to be $200,000. Quintero explained his decision to join Minnesota United by saying he and his family needed a change and new experiences, as well as being intrigued by the club's plans for the future. Quintero made his Minnesota debut on 14 April, scoring once in a 3–2 loss to the Portland Timbers. He recorded his first assist for Minnesota on 22 April in a 3–1 loss to Seattle Sounders FC. On 28 April, Quintero made his home debut for the Loons, marking the occasion by scoring once to help Minnesota get a 2–1 victory over the Houston Dynamo. On 4 July Quintero scored three chipped goals to give the Loons a 4–3 win over Toronto FC, recording the first hat-trick in Minnesota United's history. In his next 7 games, Quintero continued to stay hot, scoring 4 goals and assisting on 7 more. During that stretch he was named to the 2018 MLS All-Star game. He missed the next two games due to a calf injury. Quintero managed to record 6 assists in the final 8 games after returning from injury, but only scored once during that stretch. He had a successful debut season with the Loons, leading the team with 11 goals and 15 assists. Quintero was named to the MLS Team of the Week five times, being named MLS Player of the Week for Week 19. His 15 assists were also tied for the fourth most in the league. Despite Quintero's performances, Minnesota finished 10th place in the Western Conference, missing out on the playoffs by 13 points.

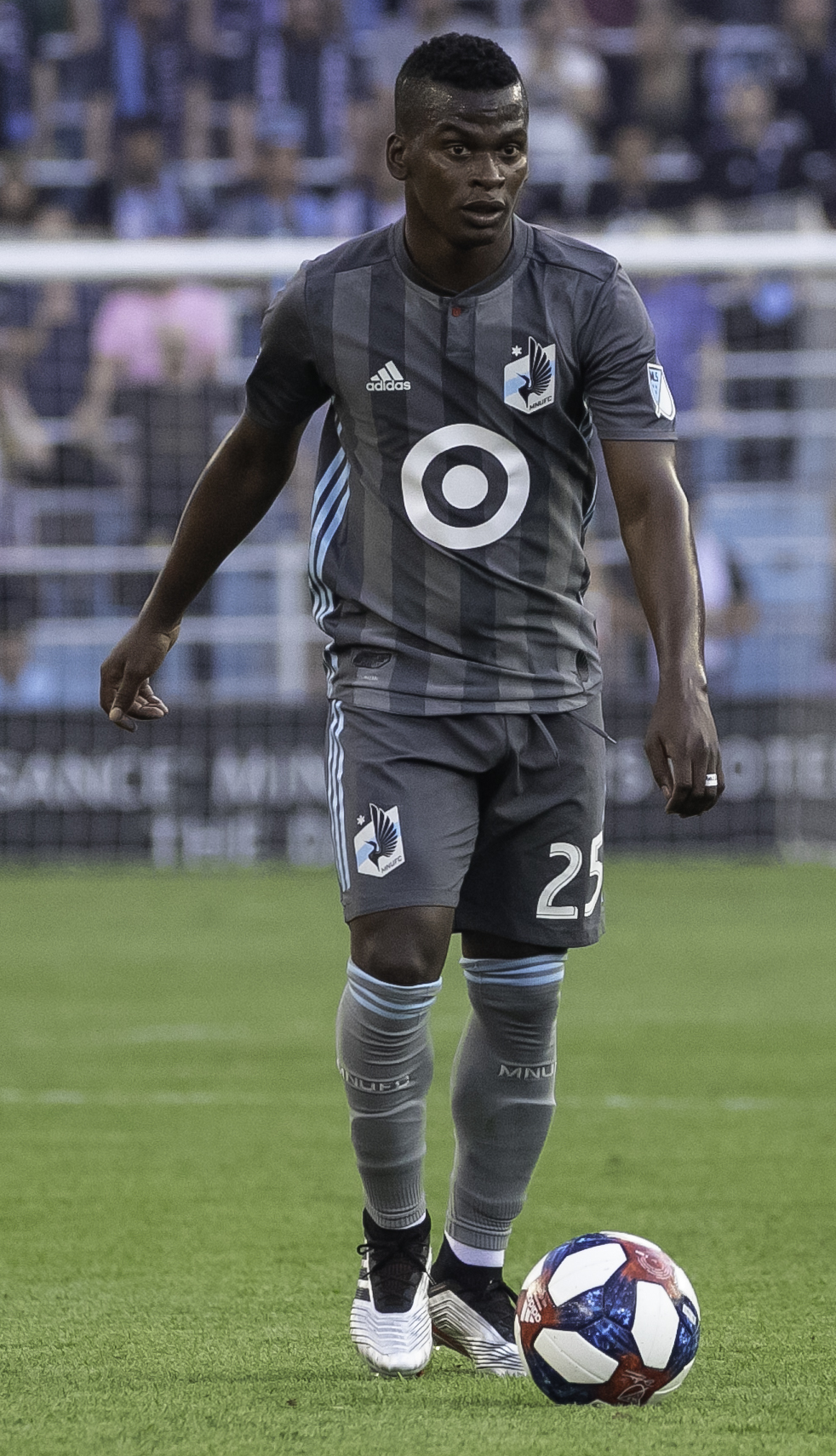
Quintero playing with Minnesota United against New Mexico United in the 2019 US Open Cup

Quintero started the 2019 season off well, scoring once and assisting two more to give Minnesota a 3–1 win over Vancouver Whitecaps FC in the opening game of the season. In their next game, Quintero scored once and picked up another assist to help the Loons to a 3–0 win against the San Jose Earthquakes. On 3 April, Quintero suffered a groin injury, but it only forced him to miss one game. On 19 April, Quintero found the back of the net twice in a 4–3 loss to Toronto FC. He had 2 assists on 29 June as the Loons defeated FC Cincinnati 7–1. Quintero scored two goals on 15 September to help Minnesota defeat Real Salt Lake 3–1. Although he didn't have as good as a season as 2018, Quintero still managed to score 10 league goals, which led the team. His 5 league assists were the third most on the team. He featured in the MLS team of the Weak four times throughout the season. Quintero also helped the Loons qualify for the MLS Cup Playoffs for the first time in club history. He came off the bench and provided an assist in their first round matchup, a 2–1 defeat to the LA Galaxy.

Quintero and the Loons also enjoyed a successful run in the 2019 U.S. Open Cup. Quintero made his first appearance of the tournament on 12 June, scoring twice and adding an assist as Minnesota defeated Sporting Kansas City 4–1. In the Round of 16, Quintero scored twice to help the Loons recover from a two-goal deficit and defeat the Houston Dynamo 3–2. He scored again in the quarterfinals, helping Minnesota advance past New Mexico United by a score of 6–1. Quintero would score his sixth goal in his fourth Open Cup game of the season to help the Loons defeat the Portland Timbers 2–1 and advance to the first US Open Cup final in club history. He would begin the final on the bench, coming on in the second half. However Quintero was unable to rescue the Loons as they fell to Atlanta United FC 2–1. Quintero's six goals saw him win the Open Cup Golden boot. He was also named as the Player of the Tournament, the first time the award had gone to a player who failed to win the cup in over a decade.

On 11 November, Quintero took to social media to announce that Minnesota United had declined his contract option. Club spokespeople announced that his option had not been declined. Minnesota was looking to trade Quintero to another MLS team. As of the end of the 2019 season, Quintero had scored the most goals and also had the most assists in the club's brief 3-year history.

=== Houston Dynamo ===
On 13 November 2019, Quintero was traded to the Houston Dynamo for Marlon Hairston and $600,000 in allocation money. He suffered a thigh injury in preseason that caused him to miss the season opener. Quintero made his Dynamo debut in Houston's second game, coming off the bench on 7 March in a 4–0 loss to Sporting Kansas City. Soon after, the MLS season was paused due to the COVID-19 pandemic. MLS returned to play in July with the MLS is Back Tournament. On 13 July Quintero recorded 2 assists to help Houston to a 3–3 draw with LAFC in their opening match of the tournament. He scored his first goal for the Dynamo on 23 July in a 1–1 draw with the LA Galaxy. On 25 August Quintero scored 2 goals and added 2 assists to help Houston to a 5–2 win over Sporting Kansas City. He was rewarded for his dominant performance by making the MLS Team of the Week. Quintero scored against his former club Minnesota United in a comprehensive 3–0 victory on 2 September. He was named to his second consecutive Team of the Week for the performance. Quintero scored against his former club again on 19 September on a chip from the top of the box, helping Houston to a 2–2 draw against Minnesota. Quintero enjoyed a strong debut season for the Dynamo, scoring 7 goals and recording 10 assists while appearing in 22 of a possible 23 games in a shortened season due to COVID-19. His 10 assists tied for the most in the league. Despite Quintero's great form, it was a poor season for Houston as a team, finishing last in the Western Conference and missing out on the playoffs.

For the first part of the 2021 season, Quintero found himself on the bench. A combination of fitness issues and head coach Tab Ramos wanting to play with a high-press led to Quintero playing sparingly over the first 4 months of the season. He also missed games in August after catching COVID-19. Quintero started his first game of the season on 11 September, Houston's 24th game of the season. He helped the Dynamo end a 16-match winless streak by beating Austin FC 3–0. On 15 September he picked up his first assist of the season as Houston drew 1–1 against the Galaxy. Quintero scored his first goal of the season on 18 September in a 3–2 win over Texas Derby rivals FC Dallas. On 16 October, Quintero had a goal and an assist to give the Dynamo a 2–1 win against Seattle Sounders FC. The goal was named MLS Goal of the Week and he was named to the MLS Team of the Week. Quintero ended the season with 3 goals and 2 assists in 20 appearances, 9 of them starts, as the Dynamo once again finished last in the West. Following the 2021 season, Quintero's contract option was declined by Houston. On 21 December he re-signed with the Dynamo, agreeing to a non-Designated Player contract to remain in Houston for 2022, with a team option for 2023.

After coming off the bench in the first 2 games of the season, Quintero got his first start of the season on 12 March and scored twice to give Houston a 2–1 win over Vancouver. He ended the season with 32 regular season appearances, 22 of thems starts, and picked up 8 goals and 5 assists. It was another disappointing season for the Dynamo, finishing 13th in the conference and missing the playoffs again. Following the season the Dynamo declined Quintero's contract option.

=== América de Cali ===
On 23 December 2022, Quintero returned to Colombia, signing with Categoría Primera A side América de Cali. He made his debut for los Diablos Rojos on 26 January, getting the start in a 2–1 loss to his former club Deportes Tolima. On 31 January he recorded his first 2 assists for América, helping them defeat Unión Magdalena 4–0. On 4 February, Quintero scored his first goal for América and picked up an assist in a 4–2 win over Deportivo Pasto.

== International career ==
Quintero was part of the Colombia U-20 national team in 2007, making 8 appearances and scoring one goal, the winner against Argentina, at the 2007 South American U-20 Championship. He made his senior Colombia debut against Paraguay on 11 October 2008 in a 2010 FIFA World Cup qualification match. He scored his first goal against Mexico in a 2–1 friendly win on 30 September 2009. Although he has not been called up since 2012, Quintero says he still hopes to rejoin the national team and represent his country again.

== Career statistics ==
=== Club ===
As of 12 May 2024

Club Performance			League		National cup		Continental		Other		Total	
Club	Season	League	Apps	Goals	Apps	Goals	Apps	Goals	Apps	Goals	Apps	Goals
Deportes Tolima	2005	Categoría Primera A	1	0	—		—		—		1	0
Deportes Tolima	2006	Categoría Primera A	42	19	—		6 (Note: Appearances in Copa Sudamericana)	2	—		48	21
Deportes Tolima	2007	Categoría Primera A	12	5	—		5 (Note: Appearances in Copa Libertadores)	2	—		17	7
Deportes Tolima	Total		55	24	0	0	11	4	0	0	66	28
Krylia Sovetov	2007	Russian Premier League	11	1	0	0	—		—		11	1
Deportivo Pereira (loan)	2008	Categoría Primera A	12	4	0	0	—		—		12	4
Deportivo Pereira	2008	Categoría Primera A	22	13	0	0	—		—		22	13
Deportivo Pereira	Total		34	17	0	0	0	0	0	0	34	17
Santos Laguna	2008–09	Primera División	16	4	—		4 (Note: Appearances in CONCACAF Champions League)	4	—		20	8
Santos Laguna	2009–10	Primera División	41	11	3 (Note: Appearances in InterLiga)	0	2 (Note: Appearances in North American SuperLiga)	1	—		46	12
Santos Laguna	2010–11	Primera División	33	8	—		7	3	—		40	11
Santos Laguna	2011–12	Primera División	43	14	—		8	4	—		51	18
Santos Laguna	2012–13	Liga MX	34	13	—		9	6	—		43	19
Santos Laguna	2013–14	Liga MX	41	14	4	5	7	3	—		52	22
Santos Laguna	2014–15	Liga MX	17	2	8	0	—		—		25	2
Santos Laguna	Total		225	66	15	5	37	21	0	0	277	92
Club América	2014–15	Liga MX	17	1	—		6	1	1 (Note: Appearance in Campeón de Campeones)	0	24	2
Club América	2015–16	Liga MX	39	12	—		9	4	1 (Note: Appearance(s) in FIFA Club World Cup)	0	49	16
Club América	2016–17	Liga MX	26	2	9	2	—		3	0	38	4
Club América	2017–18	Liga MX	25	2	6	1	3	1	1 (Note: Appearance in Supercopa MX)	0	35	4
Club América	Total		107	17	15	3	18	6	6	0	146	26
Minnesota United FC	2018	Major League Soccer	27	11	1	0	—		—		28	11
Minnesota United FC	2019	Major League Soccer	30	10	5	6	—		1 (Note: Appearances in MLS Cup Playoffs)	0	37	16
Minnesota United FC	Total		57	21	6	6	0	0	1	0	64	27
Houston Dynamo	2020	Major League Soccer	22	7	—		—		—		22	7
Houston Dynamo	2021	Major League Soccer	20	3	—		—		—		20	3
Houston Dynamo	2022	Major League Soccer	31	8	1	0	—		—		32	8
Houston Dynamo	Total		73	18	1	0	0	0	0	0	74	18
América de Cali	2023	Categoría Primera A	42	5	2	0	—		—		44	5
Pereira	2024	Categoría Primera A	18	9	0	0	0	0	0	0	18	9
Career total			622	178	39	14	66	31	7	0	734	223

=== International ===
As of match played 27 November 2019

Appearances and goals by national team and year
National team	Year	Apps	Goals
Colombia	2008	3	0
Colombia	2009	6	1
Colombia	2010	2	0
Colombia	2011	2	0
Colombia	2012	1	0
Total		14	1

Scores and results list Colombia's goal tally first.

#	Date	Venue	Opponent	Score	Final	Competition
1.	30 September 2009	Cotton Bowl, Dallas, United States	Mexico	2–0	2–1	Friendly

== Personal ==
Quintero was born in Tumaco, Colombia, but moved to Cali when he was five, living in the Puerta del Sol district with his dad and sister. He is not named after scientist Charles Darwin, but rather the character in a book his father liked. Quintero says he wanted to be a professional footballer for as long as he can remember, claiming to have letters from when he was seven stating his career goal. Quintero and his wife Valentina Sierra have two kids together.

Quintero became a naturalized citizen of Mexico in 2013. In March 2019, Quintero earned a U.S. green card, which qualifies him as a domestic player for MLS roster purposes.

== Honours ==
Santos Laguna

- Primera División: Clausura 2012
- Copa MX: Apertura 2014

América

- CONCACAF Champions League: 2014–15, 2015–16

Individual

- Primera A Player of the Tournament, Torneo Finalización: 2008
- CONCACAF Champions League Top scorer: 2012–13 (6 goals)
- MLS All-Star: 2018
- U.S. Open Cup Top scorer: 2019 (6 goals)
- U.S. Open Cup Player of the Tournament: 2019
- MLS top assist provider: 2020
