= Arnulfo González =

Mexican footballer (born 1991)

Arnulfo González Navarro (born 9 August 1991 in San Buenaventura, Coahuila) is a Mexican professional footballer who plays for Loros de la Universidad de Colima. He also played for Santos Laguna.
