= José Rodolfo Reyes =

Mexican footballer (born 1988)

José Rodolfo Reyes Machado (Note: In this Spanish name, the first or paternal surname is Reyes and the second or maternal family name is Machado.) (born February 25, 1988, in Gómez Palacio, Durango) is a former professional Mexican footballer who last played for Correcaminos UAT.
