= Adrián Ruelas =

American soccer player (born 1991)

Personal information
- Full name: Gustavo Adrián Ruelas Aguilar
- Date of birth: March 18, 1991 (age 35)
- Place of birth: Fontana, California, United States
- Height: 1.86 m (6 ft 1 in)
- Position: Forward

Youth career
- 2008–2010: Santos Laguna

Senior career*
Years	Team	Apps	(Gls)
2010–	Santos Laguna II	3	(0)
2010–2013	Santos Laguna	2	(0)
2010	→ Celtic (loan)	0	(0)
2011–2012	→ Jaguares (loan)	1	(0)
2012–2013	→ Veracruz (loan)	0	(0)
Total		6	(0)

International career
2010	United States U20	7	(3)
- * Club domestic league appearances and goals

Gustavo Adrián Ruelas Aguilar (born March 18, 1991) is an American former professional soccer player who played as a forward.

== Club career ==
Ruelas signed for Club Santos Laguna, and captained the Santos under-20 team. Celtic agreed to a deal with Santos Laguna, for a one-year loan with an option to buy him, but the move was not made permanent. Ruelas made his debut for the Santos first team on March 5, 2011, in a 3–2 loss to Club América.

== International career ==
Ruelas was called up to the Mexico U17 national team. He was also called to the United States U20.
