= Milton Aguilar =

Mexican footballer (born 1984)

Milton Michel Aguilar
Personal information
- Full name: Milton Michell Aguilar Limas
- Date of birth: March 2, 1984 (age 42)
- Place of birth: Mexico City, Mexico
- Height: 1.83 m (6 ft 0 in)
- Position: Goalkeeper

Senior career*
Years	Team	Apps	(Gls)
2007–2009	Club América	0	(0)
2009–2011	Santos Laguna	0	(0)
2010–2011	→Alacranes de Durango (loan)	1	(0)
- * Club domestic league appearances and goals

Milton Aguilar (born 2 March 1984, in Mexico City) is a Mexican former goalkeeper for Alacranes de Durango.

== Club career ==
He used to be the third goalkeeper at Club América, after Guillermo Ochoa and Armando Navarrete. Milton used to play for the Primera A (2nd Division) team of Club América, Socio Aguila
