= Jorge Barrera =

Mexican footballer (born 1982)

Personal information
- Full name: Jorge Armando Barrera Toscano
- Date of birth: 17 February 1982 (age 44)
- Place of birth: Guadalajara, Jalisco, Mexico
- Height: 1.76 m (5 ft 9 in)
- Positions: Defender; midfielder

Senior career*
Years	Team	Apps	(Gls)
2001–2006	Guadalajara	45	(1)
2006	→ Querétaro (loan)	8	(0)
2007–2012	Santos Laguna	21	(0)
2007	→ Chivas USA (loan)	0	(0)
2010–2011	→ La Piedad (loan)	19	(2)
2011–2012	→ Correcaminos UAT (loan)	9	(0)
2012	Veracruz	7	(0)
2012–2013	Tecos UAG	6	(0)
- * Club domestic league appearances and goals as of 27 April 2013

Jorge Armando Barrera Toscano (born February 17, 1982) is a Mexican former footballer. He last played for Estudiantes Tecos.
