= Estadio Corona =

Stadium in Torreón, Mexico

- El Templo del Desierto "The Desert Temple"; La Casa del Dolor Ajeno "The House of Others' Pain"
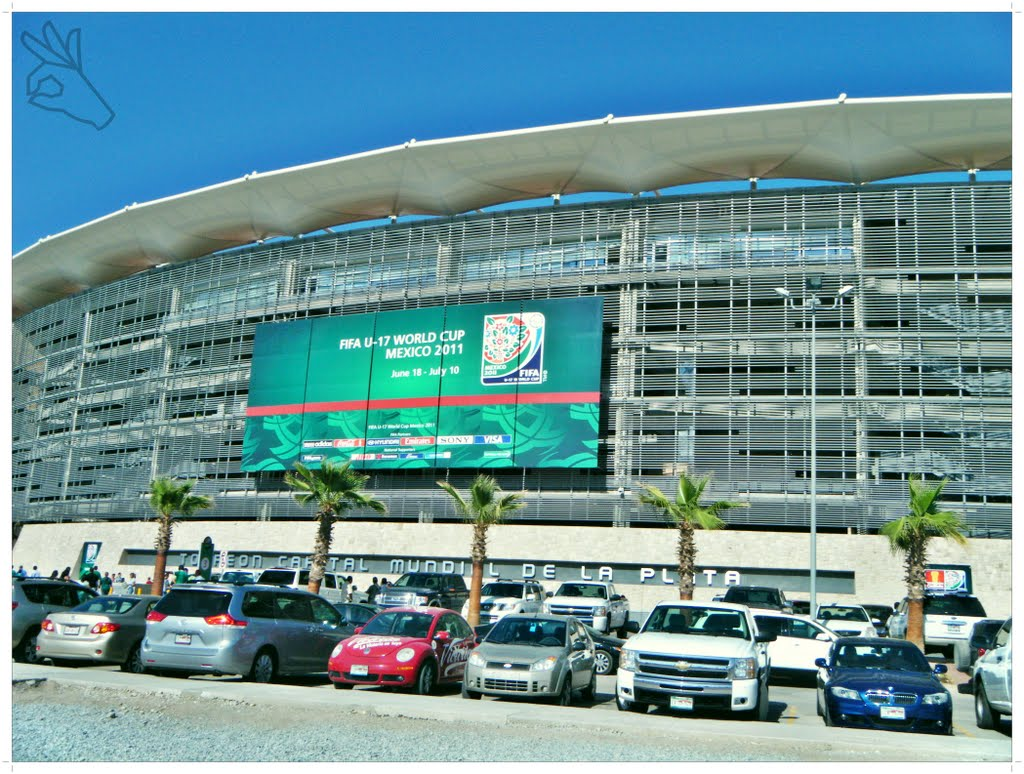
- Interactive map of Estadio Corona
- Location: Torreón, Coahuila, Mexico
- Coordinates: 25.629°N 103.379°W
- Owner: Orlegi Sports
- Capacity: 29,101

Construction
- Groundbreaking: 14 November 2007
- Opened: 11 November 2009
- Cost: $ 100 million
- Architect: HKS

Tenants
- Santos Laguna (2009–present); Mexico national football team (selected matches)

The Estadio Corona is a stadium in Torreón, Coahuila, Mexico, and the home stadium of Santos Laguna of Liga MX.

== History ==
It was completed in 2009, it has a standard capacity of 30,000, with 20,000 for special events. The stadium's total cost was US$100 million. The stadium replaced the older Estadio Corona, built in 1970 with a capacity of just 18,000. The stadium is part of the Territorio Santos Modelo.

=== Inauguration ===
The inauguration of the stadium took place on 11 November 2009, with a football match between Santos Laguna and Santos FC. Before the game, New Orleans Saints cheerleaders, and a concert by singer Ricky Martin preceded the event. The party included some of the club's great players, including Jorge Campos, René Higuita, Franco Baresi, Gabriel Omar Batistuta, George Weah, Enzo Francescoli, and Bebeto, as well as Pelé, who was responsible for giving the opening kickoff. The FIFA president at the time, Joseph Blatter, was also present. The opening statement was given by the President of Mexico Felipe Calderón, accompanied by Coahuila Governor Humberto Moreira. The first goal was scored by Vicente Matias Vuoso in the 6th minute of the game.

=== 2011 shooting ===
On Saturday, 20 August 2011, a first division football match between Monarcas Morelia and Santos Laguna was suspended due to gunfire outside the stadium. During the 40th minute gunshots were heard and players, coaches, staff from both teams and referees ran for cover. Thousands of spectators ran onto the field or went under the seats to protect themselves. The shootout happened outside the stadium when three vehicles refused to stop at a checkpoint and started shooting. Nobody inside the stadium was injured but one policeman outside the stadium was injured.

== Facilities ==
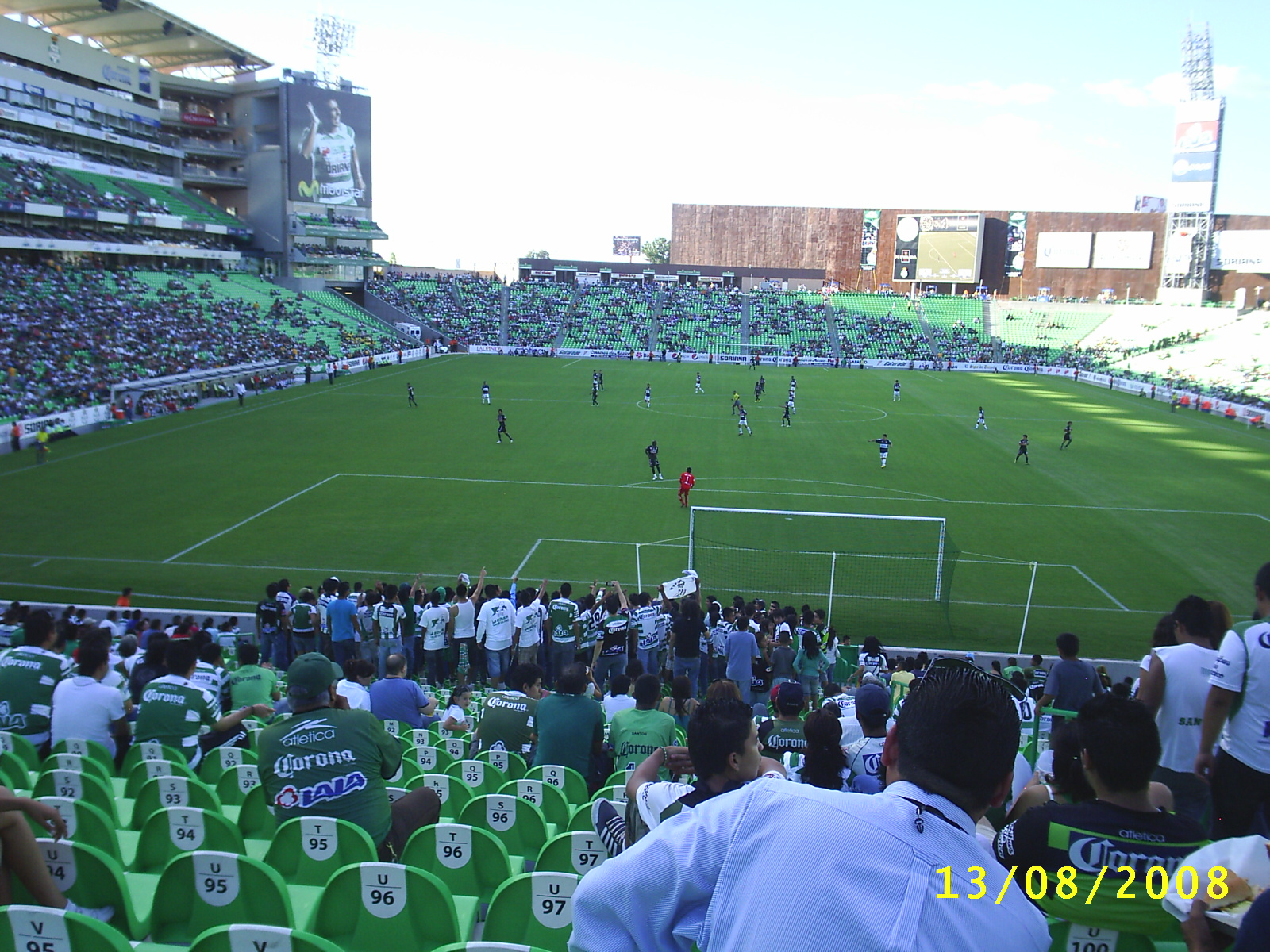
Friendly game vs. Gimnasia y Esgrima de La Plata

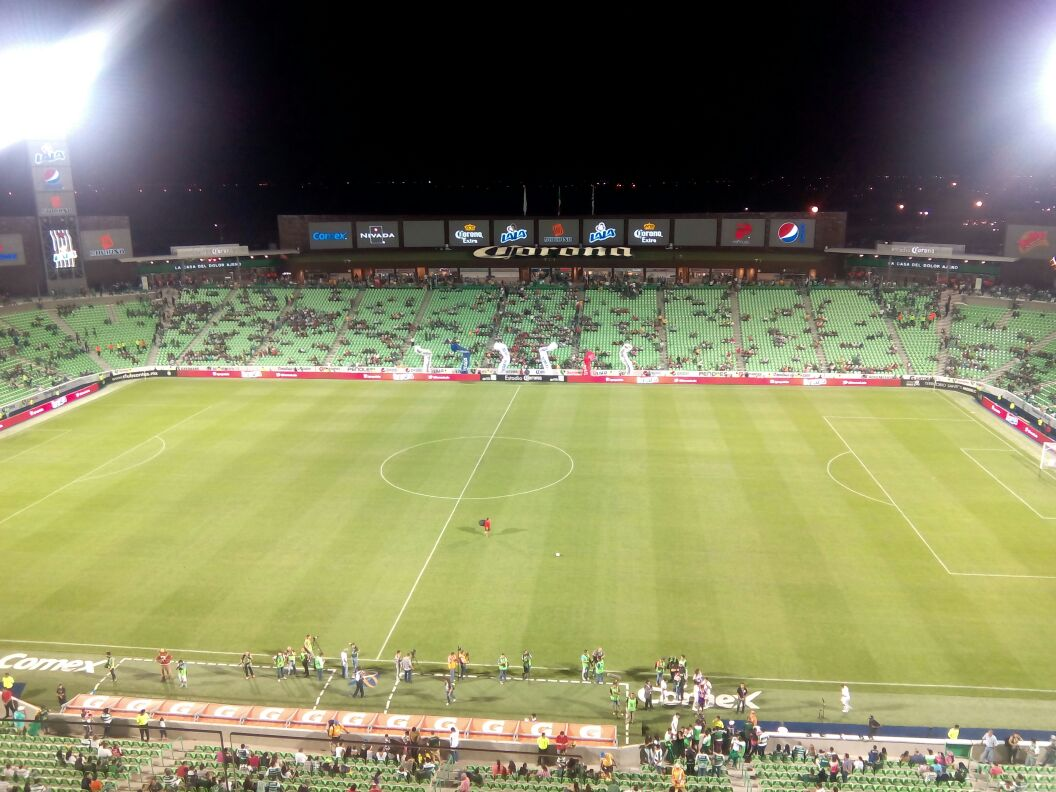
Estadio Corona and facilities in Torreón, Coahuila, Mexico

The Estadio Corona is the most important part of the complex of the Territorio Santos Modelo (TSM), which has the following facilities:

- Capacity for 30,000 spectators, divided into 5 levels;
- It consists of 112 suites and 2 superpalcos;
- Press Room for 50 people, press box for 170 journalists;
- Area for people with disabilities;
- Ballroom and events for 500 people at Star Lounge;
- RockSport gym, overlooking the pitch;
- Offices and Laguna Azteca TV studios;
- Restaurant La Chopería, Corona Corona Club Bar and Lounge;
- Auditorium;
- Trophy Room;
- Shop Santos, by Innova Sport;
- 2 Main and 2 Preliminaries dressing room;
- Dressing room for three referees;
- Commissioners office;
- Antidoping room;
- Cabin;
- Administrative offices of Club Santos Laguna;
- Parish of All Saints;
- Santos Soccer School Lala;
- Youth divisions;
- Clubhouse;
- High Performance Centre (2 synthetic grass tennis courts and 3 ½ natural grass);
- 2,504 parking spaces.

== See also ==
- List of football stadiums in Mexico
