= Juan Pablo Santiago =

Mexican footballer (born 1980)

Personal information
- Full name: Juan Pablo Santiago Santiago
- Date of birth: 25 August 1980 (age 46)
- Place of birth: Zapotiltic, Mexico
- Height: 1.83 m (6 ft 0 in)
- Position: Defender

Senior career*
Years	Team	Apps	(Gls)
1999–2003	Atlas	27	(1)
2003–2005	Veracruz	67	(1)
2005–2007	Atlas	64	(3)
2007–2011	Santos Laguna	88	(1)
2011–2013	Tijuana	15	(3)
- * Club domestic league appearances and goals

Juan Pablo Santiago Santiago (born 25 August 1980) is a Mexican retired footballer.

== Career ==
Born in Zapotiltic, Santiago began playing football with the youth side of Atlas before making his senior debut in 1999. In a more than 10-year career, Santiago played for Atlas, Veracruz, Santos Laguna and Tijuana. The central defender won the Primera División with Santos in 2008.

On 9 March 2013, he announced his retirement from professional football.

== Honors ==
=== Tijuana ===
- Liga MX (1): Apertura 2012
