= Joaquín Reyes (footballer) =

Mexican footballer (born 1978)

Joaquin Reyes
Personal information
- Full name: Joaquin Reyes Chávez
- Date of birth: 20 February 1978 (age 48)
- Place of birth: Torreón, Mexico
- Height: 1.81 m (5 ft 11 in)
- Position: Defender

Senior career*
Years	Team	Apps	(Gls)
1999–2000	Real Sociedad de Zacatecas		
2000–2004	Santos Laguna	135	(10)
2004–2006	Veracruz	34	(0)
2006–2012	Santos Laguna	7	(0)
2007–2008	→ Alacranes de Durango (loan)	?	(?)
2009	→ Puebla F.C. (loan)	1	(0)
2010	→ Lobos de la BUAP (loan)	16	(1)
2011	→ Club León (loan)	10	(0)
2011	→ Club Celaya (loan)	2	(0)

International career
2001–2002	Mexico	6	(0)
Medal record
Representing Mexico
Runner-up	Copa America	2001
- * Club domestic league appearances and goals as of 3 July 2011

Joaquin Reyes Chávez (born 20 February 1978 in Torreón; birthdate alternatively shown as 13 August 1979) is a Mexican former footballer who last played for Celaya.

He made his debut on 20 July 2000 for Santos Laguna in a game against Puebla FC. He has played for Santos and Tiburones Rojos de Veracruz in the Primera Division de Mexico.

Reyes earned 6 caps for Mexico, playing in the 2001 FIFA Confederations Cup and the 2002 CONCACAF Gold Cup.

== Honours ==
Mexico

- Copa América runner-up: 2001
