= Alberto Soto (footballer, born 1990) =

Mexican footballer (born 1990)

Personal information
- Full name: Alberto Soto Pacheco
- Date of birth: January 18, 1990 (age 36)
- Place of birth: Torreón, Coahuila, Mexico
- Height: 1.73 m (5 ft 8 in)
- Position: Defender

Team information
- Current team: Santos Laguna
- Number: 35

Senior career*
Years	Team	Apps	(Gls)
2008–	Santos Laguna	5	(0)

International career^{‡}
2007	Mexico U-17	1	(0)
- * Club domestic league appearances and goals as of March 3, 2009 ‡ National team caps and goals as of March 3, 2009

Alberto Soto Pacheco (born January 18, 1990) is a football defender currently playing for Santos Laguna, in the Primera División de México.

Soto began his career in the Santos Laguna youth teams, until he finally managed to break into the first team at the age of 18. His debut came against Chiapas, as Santos lost 3–1.

Alberto has also been capped once for the Mexico U-17 squad, playing in the Pre-mundial sub-17 held in Honduras, against Haiti.
