= Rafael Figueroa =

Mexican footballer (born 1983)

Personal information
- Full name: Rafael Alejandro Figueroa Gómez
- Date of birth: March 14, 1983 (age 43)
- Place of birth: Torreón, Coahuila, Mexico
- Height: 1.72 m (5 ft 8 in)
- Position: Defender

Team information
- Current team: Santos Laguna U-21 (assistant)

Senior career*
Years	Team	Apps	(Gls)
2005–2016	Santos Laguna	235	(7)
2015–2016	→ Universidad Guadalajara	32	(2)

Managerial career
- 2017: Santos Laguna (Assistant)
- 2017: Santos Laguna Reserves and Academy
- 2018–2019: Santos Laguna (Assistant)
- 2019–2022: Santos Laguna Reserves and Academy
- 2022–2023: Santos Laguna (Assistant)
- 2023: Mexico U23 (Assistant)
- 2024: Santos Laguna Reserves and Academy
- 2025: Santos Laguna (assistant)
- 2025–: Santos Laguna Reserves and Academy
- * Club domestic league appearances and goals as of 7 September 2013

Rafael Alejandro Figueroa Gómez (born 14 March 1983) is a Mexican former professional footballer who played as a defender.

== Club career ==
With more than 100 caps in the First Division, he has become widely regarded as a good player. He was an effective part of Santos Laguna remaining in the Primera División de México, as well as their success in the Apertura 2007 and Clausura 2008 tournaments. Rafa Figueroa passed a long process in the inferior divisions and the First Division, with Estudiantes de Santander in 2003 - 2004 and With Leon in 2004–2005 to make debut finally the 20 of August 2005 in Culiacán, game that Santos won 3–0. He began playing like a lateral, at a time at which Santos were perforated with little budget and many players from the institution. Nevertheless, he is the only one that remained after the reorganization of the club.

== Honours ==
Santos Laguna

- Primera Division de Mexico: Clausura 2008, Clausura 2012, Clausura 2015
- Copa MX: Apertura 2014
