= Matías Vuoso =

Mexican footballer (born 1981)

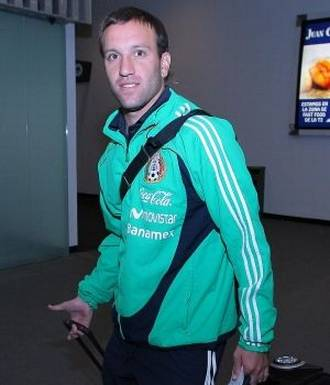
- Vuoso with Mexico

Personal information
- Full name: Vicente José Matías Vuoso
- Date of birth: 3 November 1981 (age 44)
- Place of birth: Mar Del Plata, Argentina
- Height: 1.79 m (5 ft 10 in)
- Position: Striker

Youth career
- Independiente

Senior career*
Years	Team	Apps	(Gls)
2000–2002	Independiente	65	(14)
2002–2003	Manchester City	0	(0)
2003–2006	Santos Laguna	102	(57)
2006	América	20	(5)
2007–2010	Santos Laguna	124	(37)
2010–2012	América	63	(22)
2012–2013	Atlas	57	(10)
2014–2015	→ Chiapas (loan)	33	(9)
2015–2016	Cruz Azul	27	(5)
2016–2017	Talleres de Córdoba	1	(0)
2017	Correcaminos UAT	12	(2)
Total		504	(161)

International career
2008–2015	Mexico	15	(6)
- * Club domestic league appearances and goals

Vicente José Matías Vuoso (born 3 November 1981) is a former professional footballer who played as a striker. Born in Argentina, he played for the Mexico national team.

Born in Mar del Plata, Vuoso began his career at Independiente in 2000, then transferring to English club Manchester City in 2002, where he did not play in a single league match. Since 2003 he has played in Mexico, having two stints with Santos Laguna and Club América, as well as playing for Atlas and Chiapas.

Vuoso chose to represent Mexico at international level, making his debut in 2008 and featured for them at the 2015 Copa América.

== Club career ==
=== Early career ===
Matías Vuoso began his career in the Argentine Primera División with Independiente. Playing alongside Diego Forlán, Vicente scored seven goals in 29 games for Independiente in 2000–01 and another seven in 35 games in 2001–02. He left the Argentinian club in June 2002 to sign with English club Manchester City, joining for £3.5 million. However, Vuoso did not appear in a single game for Manchester City, and was subsequently loaned out to Santos Laguna for the 2003–04 season.

=== Santos Laguna ===
Despite moving from the Premier League to the Primera Division Mexicana, in the beginning of his stay in Mexico, Vuoso experienced the same problems at Santos Laguna that he faced at Manchester City. Coming to a club that already boasted an attack that featured Chilean playmaker Rodrigo Ruiz and Mexican striker Jared Borgetti, Vuoso was exclusively played as a substitute during the first part of the Apertura 2003 season. As fate would have it however, Vuoso was thrown into the starting mix when Borgetti suffered a minor injury that required a two-week absence from the pitch. Vuoso scored in both of the games he started in place of Borgetti and subsequently convinced Santos manager Luis Fernando Tena, who awarded Vuoso a starting spot.

After Jared Borgetti's exit from Santos Laguna following the Clausura 2004 season, Vuoso became Santos Laguna's main goalscoring threat and teammate Rodrigo Ruiz's primary target for his passes. Vuoso exploded with 11 goals in 17 games for Santos in the Apertura 2004 campaign and then followed that up with 16 goals in 19 games the following season.

=== América ===
Newly appointed América manager Luis Fernando Tena brought Vuoso to the club as a reinforcement for the Apertura 2006 campaign. Following the club's semi-final defeat, Vuoso was sold back to Santos. He only managed to score 5 goals in 20 league matches for América.

=== Return to Santos Laguna ===
Vuoso was bought by Santos Laguna again after Clausura 2007 for an undisclosed amount of money. Upon his return, a loss of form kept Vuoso on the bench. However, Vuoso would later become a key player in Santos Laguna's 2008 Clausura championship campaign.

However, during the finals of the Clausura 2010, he failed to score twice in two important plays during the second game against Toluca and made that Santos were meant to play extra-time and penalty shots. In the penalty shots he was the fourth player and failed to score his penalty shot allowing Toluca to get the championship.

After this game, Vuoso was transferred to Club America.

=== Return to América ===
For the Apertura 2010 season, he signed with América, which would be his second stint with the club. In his first season with América, he scored 8 goals, helping América reach the semi-finals, being defeated by his ex-club Santos.

=== Atlas ===
América sold Vuoso to Atlas de Guadalajara for the Apertura 2012 tournament. He scored ten goals in over 50 matches played with Atlas.

==== Loan to Chiapas ====
Atlas loaned Vuoso to Chiapas for the Apertura 2014.

=== Cruz Azul ===
On 25 July 2015, Cruz Azul announced the signing of Vuoso for the Apertura 2015. During this time, Vuoso was a free agent.

== International career ==
Upon receiving his Mexican citizenship, Vuoso said that if Hugo Sánchez, former coach of the Mexico national team, ever needed a striker, he would be honored to wear the green jersey while helping the country of his new home win. On 3 August 2008 Mexico coach and former Manchester City manager Sven-Göran Eriksson had Matias Vuoso, the second naturalized striker on the Mexico squad, replace Omar Arellano who injured himself days before. His debut came when he came on as a substitute in a 3–0 win over Jamaica at the Azteca stadium.

On 15 October 2008, Vuoso scored his first goal with the team against Canada with a header. The game was a World Cup Qualifier Match. On 12 November 2008, Vuoso scored a last minute goal for Mexico to win over Ecuador 2–1. On 11 March 2009, he scored again twice against Bolivia, in a game that ended 5–1.

On 11 May 2015, Vuoso was called up to participate in the 2015 Copa América. He would make world football headlines by scoring a memorable brace in what was a surprising tie against Chile whom were the eventual Copa America winners.

=== International goals ===
Scores and results list Mexico's goal tally first, score column indicates score after each Vuoso goal.

List of international goals scored by Vicente Matías Vuoso
No.	Date	Venue	Opponent	Score	Result	Competition
1	15 October 2008	Commonwealth Stadium, Edmonton, Canada	Canada	2–2	2–2	2010 FIFA World Cup qualification
2	12 November 2008	Chase Field, Phoenix, United States	Ecuador	2–1	2–1	Friendly
3	11 March 2009	Dick's Sporting Goods Park, Commerce City, United States	Bolivia	2–0	5–1	Friendly
4	11 March 2009	Dick's Sporting Goods Park, Commerce City, United States	Bolivia	4–0	5–1	Friendly
5	15 June 2015	Estadio Nacional, Santiago, Chile	Chile	1–0	3–3	2015 Copa América
6	15 June 2015	Estadio Nacional, Santiago, Chile	Chile	3–3	3–3	2015 Copa América

== Personal life ==
During his time with Manchester City, he, along with players Daniel Van Buyten and Djamel Belmadi, were the victim of a theft by two bankers. In total, workers at the Co-operative Bank stole more than £350,000 from the accounts of the three players. In January 2006, the bank workers, Paul Sherwood, a cashier, and Paul Hanley, his supervisor, were jailed for 32 months and 12 months respectively.

== Honours ==
Santos Laguna

- Primera División de México: Clausura 2008
- InterLiga: 2004

Individual

- Primera División de México Golden Boot: Clausura 2005, Apertura 2005 (Shared)
