= 2011 Primera División de México Apertura Liguilla Final =

Primera División de México Apertura 2011 Liguilla Final
- Event: 2011 Apertura Liguilla
Santos Laguna	Tigres UANL
(Mexico)	(Mexico)
1	4
- On aggregate

First leg
Santos Laguna	Tigres UANL
0	1
- Date: December 8, 2011 20:30 (UTC-6)
- Venue: Estadio Corona, Torreón, Coahuila
- Man of the Match: (Argentina) Damián Álvarez
- Referee: Paul Delgadillo
- Attendance: 30,000

Second leg
Tigres UANL	Santos Laguna
3	1
- Date: December 11, 2011 18:00 (UTC-6)
- Venue: Estadio Universitario, San Nicolás, Nuevo León
- Man of the Match: (Brazil) Danilinho
- Referee: Marco Antonio Rodríguez
- Attendance: 45,531

The 2011 Apertura Liguilla Final is a two-legged football match-up to determine the 2011 Apertura champion.

After 17 matches on the regular season, and 2 two-legged rounds of Liguilla, Tigres UANL and Santos Laguna have reached the final.

This final was the third of Santos Laguna in 4 tournaments, the other two where in the Bicentenario 2010 losing against Toluca on a penalty shoot-out and the Apertura 2010 losing against Monterrey with the score of 5 - 3.

This final was the first of Tigres UANL since 2003, when they lost 3 - 2 on aggregate against Pachuca. Also Tigres UANL hadn't won the league since the 1981–82 season when they became winners against Atlante on a penalty shoot-out.

== Final rules ==
Like other match-ups in the knockout round, the teams will play two games, one at each team's home stadium. As the highest seeded team determined at the beginning of the Liguilla, will have home-field advantage for the second leg.

However, the tiebreaking criteria used in previous rounds will not be the same in the final. If the teams remained tied after 90 minutes of play during the 2nd leg, extra time will be used, followed by a penalty shootout if necessary.

== Route to the final ==
Tigres UANL		Round	Santos Laguna
Opponent	Result	Regular Season	Opponent	Result
Cruz Azul	1 - 1	Match 1	Pachuca	4 - 1
Querétaro	0 - 0	Match 2	Atlante	3 - 0
Toluca	2 - 2	Match 3	Chiapas	2 - 3
Estudiantes Tecos	1 - 0	Match 4	Tijuana	1 - 3
América	2 - 2	Match 5	Pumas UNAM	1 - 1
San Luis	1 - 0	Match 6	Morelia	0 - 2
Atlas	1 - 0	Match 7	Monterrey	0 - 2
Pachuca	5 - 0	Match 8	Guadalajara	1 - 1
Atlante	0 - 1	Match 9	San Luis	1 - 0
Chiapas	1 - 1	Match 10	Puebla	2 - 1
Tijuana	1 - 1	Match 11	Cruz Azul	1 - 0
Pumas UNAM	4 - 1	Match 12	Querétaro	3 - 1
Morelia	0 - 2	Match 13	Toluca	3 - 2
Monterrey	0 - 0	Match 14	Estudiantes Tecos	2 - 5
Guadalajara	0 - 1	Match 15	América	1 - 1
Santos Laguna	2 - 1	Match 16	Tigres UANL	1 - 2
Puebla	1 - 0	Match 17	Atlas	3 - 0
Opponent	Result	Liguilla	Opponent	Result
Pachuca	1 - 0	Quarterfinals	Chiapas	2 - 2
Pachuca	3 - 0	Quarterfinals	Chiapas	2 - 1
Querétaro	0 - 0	Semifinals	Morelia	1 - 2
Querétaro	1 - 0	Semifinals	Morelia	3 - 2

== Final ==
=== First leg ===
December 8, 2011
20:30

Santos Laguna	0 – 1	Tigres UANL
	Report	7' Álvarez

Estadio Corona
Torreón, Coahuila
Attendance: 30,000
Referee: Paul Delgadillo

Santos Laguna	Tigres UANL

Santos Laguna
GK	1	(Mexico) Oswaldo Sánchez (c) (yellow card) 23'
DF	4	(Mexico) Jorge Iván Estrada (yellow card) 28' (substituted off) 45'
DF	18	(Argentina) Santiago Hoyos
DF	23	(Panama) Felipe Baloy (yellow card) 81'
DF	14	(Mexico) César Ibáñez
MF	13	(Ecuador) Christian Suárez (substituted off) 61'
MF	17	(Mexico) Rodolfo Salinas
MF	8	(Mexico) Juan Pablo Rodríguez (red card) 23'
MF	7	(Mexico) José María Cárdenas
FW	3	(Colombia) Carlos Darwin Quintero (substituted off) 45'
FW	24	(Mexico) Oribe Peralta
Substitutes
DF	5	(Mexico) Aarón Galindo
FW	9	(Mexico) Carlos Ochoa
MF	15	(Mexico) Jaime Toledo (substituted in) 61'
DF	20	(Mexico) Osmar Mares (substituted in) 45'
GK	25	(Mexico) Miguel Becerra
DF	28	(Mexico) Carlos Adrián Morales (substituted in) 45' (yellow card) 58'
FW	65	(Mexico) Alonso Escoboza
Manager
(Mexico) Benjamín Galindo

Tigres UANL
GK	1	(Mexico) Enrique Palos
DF	2	(Mexico) Israel Jiménez
DF	3	(Brazil) Juninho
DF	4	(Mexico) Hugo Ayala
DF	6	(Mexico) Jorge Torres Nilo
MF	15	(Mexico) Manuel Viniegra (substituted off) 88'
MF	30	(Mexico) Carlos Salcido
MF	10	(Brazil) Danilinho
MF	16	(Argentina) Lucas Lobos (c)
MF	11	(Argentina) Damián Álvarez
FW	9	(Chile) Héctor Mancilla (substituted off) 72'
Substitutes
MF	18	(Mexico) Francisco Acuña
FW	19	(Mexico) Alan Pulido (substituted in) 72'
GK	21	(Mexico) Aarón Fernández
MF	22	(Mexico) Edgar Pacheco
DF	24	(Mexico) José Arturo Rivas
MF	28	(Mexico) Alberto Acosta
MF	29	(Mexico) Jesús Dueñas (substituted in) 88'
Manager
(Brazil) Ricardo Ferretti

Paul Delgadillo Man of the Match
(Argentina) Damián Álvarez
Assistant referees
(Mexico) Salvador Rodríguez
(Mexico) Carlos González
Fourth official
(Mexico) Ricardo Arellano

=== Second leg ===
December 11, 2011
18:00

Tigres UANL	3 – 1	Santos Laguna
Mancilla 52'; Danilinho 63'; Pulido 87'	Report	30' Peralta

Estadio Universitario
San Nicolás, Nuevo León
Attendance: 45,531
Referee: Marco Antonio Rodríguez

Tigres UANL	Santos Laguna

Tigres UANL
GK	1	(Mexico) Enrique Palos
DF	2	(Mexico) Israel Jiménez (red card) 69'
DF	3	(Brazil) Juninho
DF	4	(Mexico) Hugo Ayala
DF	6	(Mexico) Jorge Torres Nilo (yellow card) 36' (substituted off) 88'
MF	15	(Mexico) Manuel Viniegra (substituted off) 88'
MF	30	(Mexico) Carlos Salcido
MF	10	(Brazil) Danilinho (yellow card) 63'
MF	16	(Argentina) Lucas Lobos (c) (yellow card) 38'
MF	11	(Argentina) Damián Álvarez
FW	9	(Chile) Héctor Mancilla (yellow card) 56' (substituted off) 80'
Substitutes
MF	17	(Mexico) David Toledo (substituted in) 88'
FW	19	(Mexico) Alan Pulido (substituted in) 80'
GK	21	(Mexico) Aarón Fernández
MF	22	(Mexico) Edgar Pacheco
DF	24	(Mexico) José Arturo Rivas (substituted in) 88'
MF	28	(Mexico) Alberto Acosta
MF	29	(Mexico) Jesús Dueñas
Manager
(Brazil) Ricardo Ferretti

Santos Laguna
GK	1	(Mexico) Oswaldo Sánchez (c) (red card) 12'
DF	18	(Argentina) Santiago Hoyos
DF	20	(Mexico) Osmar Mares
DF	23	(Panama) Felipe Baloy (red card) 69'
DF	28	(Mexico) Carlos Adrián Morales (yellow card) 66' (substituted off) 66'
DF	14	(Mexico) César Ibáñez
MF	13	(Ecuador) Christian Suárez
MF	17	(Mexico) Rodolfo Salinas (yellow card) 19'
MF	7	(Mexico) José María Cárdenas (substituted off) 66'
FW	3	(Colombia) Carlos Darwin Quintero (substituted off) 16' (yellow card) 70'
FW	24	(Mexico) Oribe Peralta
Substitutes
DF	5	(Mexico) Aarón Galindo
FW	9	(Mexico) Carlos Ochoa
MF	10	(Argentina) Daniel Ludueña (substituted in) 66'
MF	15	(Mexico) Jaime Toledo
GK	25	(Mexico) Miguel Becerra (substituted in) 16'
DF	27	(Mexico) José Antonio Olvera
FW	37	(Mexico) Saúl Ramírez (substituted in) 66'
Manager
(Mexico) Benjamín Galindo

Marco Antonio Rodríguez Man of the Match
(Brazil) Danilinho
Assistant referees
(Mexico) Alberto Morín
(Mexico) Juan Joel Rangel
Fourth official
(Mexico) Mauricio Morales

Apertura 2011 winners:
Tigres UANL
3rd Title
