= 2011–12 Santos Laguna season =

Santos Laguna
2011–12 season
- Chairman: Alejandro Irarragorri
- Manager: Diego Cocca (Feb., 2011–Sep., 2011); Benjamín Galindo (from Sep., 2011)
- Stadium: Estadio Corona
- Apertura 2011: 4th Runners-up
- Clausura 2012: 1st Winners
- Champions League: Runners-up
- Top goalscorer: League: Apertura: Oribe Peralta (13); Clausura: Oribe Peralta (15); All: Oribe Peralta (35)
Home colours	Away colours

The 2011–12 Santos Laguna season was the 65th professional season of Mexico's top-flight football league. The season is split into two tournaments—the Torneo Apertura and the Torneo Clausura—each with identical formats and each contested by the same eighteen teams. Santos Laguna began their season on July 23, 2011, against Pachuca, Santos Laguna play their homes games on Saturdays at 7:00pm local time.

== Torneo Apertura ==
=== Squad ===
Note: Flags indicate national team as defined under FIFA eligibility rules; some limited exceptions apply. Players may hold more than one non-FIFA nationality.

No.	Pos.	Nation	Player
1	GK	MEX	Oswaldo Sánchez (Captain)
3	FW	COL	Carlos Darwin Quintero
4	DF	MEX	Jorge Iván Estrada
5	DF	MEX	Aarón Galindo
7	MF	MEX	José María Cárdenas
8	MF	MEX	Juan Pablo Rodríguez (Vice-Captain)
9	FW	MEX	Carlos Ochoa
10	MF	ARG	Daniel Ludueña
12	DF	MEX	José León Hoyo
13	FW	ECU	Christian Suárez
15	MF	MEX	Jaime Toledo
17	MF	MEX	Rodolfo Salinas

No.	Pos.	Nation	Player
18	DF	ARG	Santiago Hoyos
19	DF	MEX	Rafael Figueroa
20	DF	MEX	Osmar Mares
23	DF	PAN	Felipe Baloy
24	FW	MEX	Oribe Peralta
25	GK	MEX	Miguel Becerra
27	DF	MEX	José Antonio Olvera
28	DF	MEX	Carlos Adrián Morales
29	FW	MEX	Juan Carlos Enríquez
32	GK	MEX	Julio González
46	MF	MEX	Arnulfo González
65	FW	MEX	Alonso Escoboza

=== Out on loan ===
Note: Flags indicate national team as defined under FIFA eligibility rules; some limited exceptions apply. Players may hold more than one non-FIFA nationality.

No.	Pos.	Nation	Player
—	FW	MEX	Agustín Enrique Herrera (to Veracruz)
—	DF	MEX	Alejandro Martínez (to Lobos BUAP)
—	FW	MEX	Daniel Guzmán Jr (to Veracruz)
—	MF	MEX	Diego Armando Esqueda (to Leones Negros)
—	MF	MEX	Francisco Javier Torres (to Atlas)
—	FW	MEX	Gustavo Ruelas (to Chiapas)
—	FW	MEX	Joaquín Reyes (to Celaya)
—	DF	URU	Jonathan Lacerda (to Atlas)
—	DF	MEX	Jorge Barrera (to Correcaminos)
—	FW	MEX	José Rodolfo Reyes (to Estudiantes Tecos)

No.	Pos.	Nation	Player
—	DF	MEX	Juan Pablo Santiago (to Tijuana)
—	MF	MEX	Miguel Zepeda (to Leones Negros)
—	DF	MEX	Uriel Álvarez (to Puebla)
—	DF	MEX	Jorge Alberto Campos (to Albinegros de Orizaba)
—	DF	MEX	Juan Carlos Arellano (to Leones Negros)
—	GK	MEX	Milton Aguilar (to Alacranes de Durango)
—	MF	MEX	Pedro Javier Jiménez (to Irapuato FC)
—	MF	ECU	Pedro Quiñónez (to Emelec)

=== Regular season ===
==== Apertura 2011 results ====
July 23, 2011 Round 1	Pachuca	1 – 4	Santos Laguna	Estadio Hidalgo, Pachuca
17:00	Chávez (yellow card) 36'; López (yellow card) 43'; Muñoz Mustafá (yellow card) 76'; López 80' (pen.); Escalante (yellow card) 84'; Cota (yellow card) 90'	Report	Peralta 11', 37', 72'; Rodríguez (yellow card) 28'; Estrada 44', (yellow card) 67'; Salinas (yellow card) 52'	Referee: Miguel Ángel Flores

July 30, 2011 Round 2	Santos Laguna	3 – 0	Atlante	Estadio Corona, Torreón
19:00	Suárez 17'; Quintero 48'; Rodríguez (yellow card) 57'; Ochoa 84'	Report	Diego (yellow card) 49'	Referee: Miguel Ángel Ayala

September 2, 2011 (Note: Moved from August 3, 2011 due to a 2011–12 CONCACAF Champions League preliminary match by Santos Laguna) Round 3	Chiapas	3 – 2	Santos Laguna	Estadio Victor Manuel Reyna, Tuxtla Gutiérrez
20:00	Rodríguez (yellow card) 8'; Arizala (yellow card) 40', (goal) 53'; Rey 57', 74'; Razo (yellow card) 66'; Zamorano (yellow card) 66'	Report	Cárdenas 13'; Enríquez 82', (yellow card) 90'	Referee: Mauricio Morales

August 6, 2011 Round 4	Santos Laguna	1 – 3	Tijuana	Estadio Corona, Torreón
19:00	Rodríguez (yellow card) 24', (goal) 32' (pen.); Sánchez (yellow card) 55'; Baloy (yellow card) 64'; Qunitero (yellow card) 79'	Report	Arce 43'; Sand 54'; Moreno 64', (yellow card) 64'	Referee: Paul Delgadillo

August 14, 2011 Round 5	UNAM	1 – 1	Santos Laguna	Estadio Olímpico Universitario, Mexico City
12:00	M. Palacios (yellow card) 48' (yellow-red card) 83'; Verón (yellow card) 69'; Herrera 80'	Report	Cárdenas (yellow card) 43'; Peralta 58'; Salinas (yellow card) 71'; Quintero (yellow card) 83'; Hoyos (red card) 90+2'	Referee: Miguel Ángel Chacón

November 1, 2011 (Note: Teams played the last 50 minutes of the match that was abandoned due to a shooting outside the stadium on August 20, 2011) Round 6	Santos Laguna	0 – 2 (Note: Match was abandoned with the score 0–0)	Morelia	Estadio Corona, Torreón
20:30 (Note: Match was originally played at 19:00 local time)		Report	Corona 59'; Márquez 89'	Referee: Francisco Chacón

August 27, 2011 Round 7	Monterrey	2 – 0	Santos Laguna	Estadio Tecnológico, Monterrey
19:00	L. Pérez 28'; Bastana (red card); Suazo (yellow card) 44', (goal) 66'	Report	Baloy (yellow card) 31'; Hoyos (yellow card) 63'	Referee: Juan Genaro Medrano

September 10, 2011 Round 8	Santos Laguna	1 – 1	Guadalajara	Estadio Corona, Torreón
19:00	Peralta (yellow card) 17'; Figueroa 51'; Ludueña (yellow card) 57'; Rodríguez (yellow card) 80'	Report	Medina (yellow card) 21', (goal) 73'; Torres (yellow card) 84'; Michel (yellow card) 87'	Referee: Fabricio Morales

September 17, 2011 Round 9	San Luis	0 – 1	Santos Laguna	Estadio Alfonso Lastras, San Luis Potosí
20:45	Orozco (yellow card) 40'; Moreno (yellow card) 70'	Report	Ludueña 11'; Hoyos (yellow card) 29'; Estrada (yellow card) 34'	Referee: Jorge Antonio Pèrez

September 25, 2011 Round 10	Puebla	1 – 2	Santos Laguna	Estadio Cuauhtémoc, Puebla
12:00	Pineda (yellow card) 15'; Silva (yellow card) 28'; Beasley (yellow card) 30'; Riascos 58' (pen.); Durán (yellow card) 86'	Report	Ludueña (yellow card) 15'; Estrada (yellow card) 33'; Quintero 45'; Peralta 48', (yellow card) 56'; Baloy (yellow card) 50'; Sánchez (yellow card) 56'	Referee: Miguel Ángel Flores

October 1, 2011 Round 11	Santos Laguna	1 – 0	Cruz Azul	Estadio Corona, Torreón
19:00	Peralta 21', (yellow card) 90+3'	Report		Referee: Marco Antonio Rodríguez

October 8, 2011 Round 12	Querétaro	1 – 3	Santos Laguna	Estadio Corregidora, Querétaro
17:00	Martínez (yellow card) 19'; Vázquez 25' (pen.)		Quintero 7'; Peralta 8'; Morales 63'; Hoyos (yellow card) 65'; Mares (yellow card) 75'	Referee: Roberto García Orozco

October 15, 2011 Round 13	Santos Laguna	3 – 2	Toluca	Estadio Corona, Torreón
19:00	Baloy (red card) 24'; Peralta 29', 43'; Rodríguez (yellow card) 57'; Suárez (yellow card) 90', (goal) 90+2'	Report	Sinha 6'; Gamboa (red card) 9'; Brizuela 50'; Novaretti (red card) 72'	Referee: Jorge Isaac Rojas

October 22, 2011 Round 14	Estudiantes Tecos	5 – 2	Santos Laguna	Estadio Tres de Marzo, Zapopan
17:00	Gómez 3', 15'; Luna 83'; Lillingston 85'; Sambueza 87'	Report	Salinas (red card) 33'; Mares (yellow card) 46'; Quintero 47'; Estrada 70'; Hoyos (yellow card) 73'	Referee: Mauricio Morales

October 26, 2011 Round 15	Santos Laguna	1 – 1	América	Estadio Corona, Torreón
21:00	Quintero 3'; Hoyos (yellow card) 38'; Estrada (red card) 52'	Report	Montenegro 7'; Jiménez (yellow card) 25'; Rodróguez (yellow card) 36'; Molina (yellow card) 48'; Mosquera (yellow card) 65'; Sánchez (red card) 85'; Rojas (yellow card) 90'; Valenzuela (yellow card) 90+4'	Referee: Miguel Ángel Ayala

October 29, 2011 Round 16	UANL	2 – 1	Santos Laguna	Estadio Universitario, San Nicolás
19:00	Danilinho 41'; Acosta 65'	Report	Suárez 45'; Baloy (yellow card) 77'	Referee: Jorge Antonio Pérez

November 5, 2011 Round 17	Santos Laguna	3 – 0	Atlas	Estadio Corona, Torreón
19:00	Baloy (yellow card) 24'; Hoyos 27', (red card) 64'; Ludueña (yellow card) 28'; Morales 88'; Peralta 90+3'	Report	Rodríguez (yellow card) 18'; Arreola (yellow card) 27'; Rojas (yellow card) 68'; Pinto (red card) 86'	Referee: Marco Antonio Rodríguez

=== Final phase ===
November 20, 2011 Quarter-finals	Chiapas	2 – 2	Santos Laguna	Estadio Victor Manuel Reyna, Tuxtla Gutierrez
16:00	Razo (yellow card) 31'; J. Martínez 84'; Arizala 90+2'	Report	Baloy 4'; Rodríguez (yellow card) 18'; Peralta 32'; Suárez (yellow card) 61'; Cárdenas (red card) 71'; Mares (yellow card) 84'	Referee: Ricardo Arellano

November 27, 2011 Quarter-finals	Santos Laguna	2 – 1	Chiapas	Estadio Corona, Torreón
17:00	Peralta (yellow card) 21'; Quintero 41'; Ludueña 73'; Sánchez (yellow card) 90'	Report	J. Martínez 66'; Rodríguez (yellow card) 86'	Referee: Roberto García Orozco

Santos Laguna advanced 4–3 on aggregate

November 30, 2011 Semi-finals	Morelia	2 – 1	Santos Laguna	Estadio Morelos, Morelia
20:30	Lozano 13'; Lugo 25'; Gastélum (yellow card) 50'	Report	Rodríguez (yellow card) 60'; Peralta 83'; Mares (yellow card) 57' (yellow-red card) 87'	Referee: Paul Delgadillo

December 3, 2011 Semi-finals	Santos Laguna	3 – 2	Morelia	Estadio Corona, Torreón
19:00	Rodríguez 34' (pen.); Baloy (yellow card) 41'; Suárez 52', 64'; Hoyos (yellow card) 57'; Salinas (yellow card) 67'; Figueroa (yellow card) 76'	Report	Gastélum (yellow card) 14'; Huiqui (red card) 33'; Vilar (yellow card) 37'; Sandoval (yellow card) 65'; Sepúlveda 74', 87'; Ramírez (red card) 90+1'	Referee: Marco Antonio Rodríguez

4–4 on aggregate, Santos Laguna advanced due to being the higher seed in the classification phase

December 8, 2011 Final	Santos Laguna	0 – 1	UANL	Estadio Corona, Torreón
20:30	Sánchez (yellow card) 23'; Rodríguez (red card) 23'; Estrada (yellow card) 29'; Morales (yellow card) 59'; Baloy (yellow card) 81'	Report	7' Álvarez	Referee: Paul Delgadillo

December 11, 2011 Final	UANL	3 – 1	Santos Laguna	Estadio Universitario, San Nicolás
18:00	Torres Nilo (yellow card) 36'; Lobos (yellow card) 38'; Mancilla 52'; Mancilla (yellow card) 56'; Danilinho 63'; Jiménez (red card) 69'; Pulido 87'	Report	Sánchez (red card) 12'; Salinas (yellow card) 19'; Peralta 30'; Morales (yellow card) 56'; Baloy (red card) 69'; Quintero (yellow card) 70'	Referee: Marco Antonio Rodríguez

UANL won 4–1 on aggregate

=== Goalscorers ===
Position	Nation	Name	Goals scored
1.	(Mexico)	Oribe Peralta	13
2.	(Colombia)	Carlos Quintero	6
3.	(Ecuador)	Cristian Suárez	5
4.	(Mexico)	Jorge Iván Estrada	2
4.	(Argentina)	Daniel Ludueña	2
4.	(Mexico)	Carlos Adrián Morales	2
4.	(Mexico)	Juan Pablo Rodríguez	2
8.	(Panama)	Felipe Baloy	1
8.	(Mexico)	José María Cárdenas	1
8.	(Mexico)	Juan Carlos Enríquez	1
8.	(Mexico)	Rafael Figueroa	1
8.	(Argentina)	Santiago Hoyos	1
8.	(Mexico)	Carlos Ochoa	1
TOTAL			38

=== Results ===
==== Results summary ====
Overall								Home						Away					
Pld	W	D	L	GF	GA	GD	Pts	W	D	L	GF	GA	GD	W	D	L	GF	GA	GD
17	8	3	6	29	25	+4	27	4	2	2	13	9	+4	4	1	4	16	16	0

Last updated: 5 November 2011.
Source: Apertura 2010 results

==== Results by round ====
Round	1	2	3	4	5	6	7	8	9	10	11	12	13	14	15	16	17
Ground	A	H	A	H	A	H	A	H	A	A	H	A	H	A	H	A	H
Result	W	W	L	L	D	L	L	D	W	W	W	W	W	L	D	L	W
Position	1	1	2	5	5	10	14	15	12	7	6	3	1	2	2	6	4

Updated to match(es) played on 5 November 2011. Source: Apertura 2011 results and mediotiempo.com
A = Away; H = Home; W = Win; D = Draw; L = Loss

== Transfers ==
=== In ===
#	Pos	Nat	Player	Age	From	Date	Notes
	FW	(United States)	Herculez Gomez	29	Estudiantes Tecos	December 12, 2011	

=== Out ===
#	Pos	Nat	Player	Age	To	Date	Notes
7	MF	(Mexico)	José María Cárdenas	26	América	December 16, 2011	

== Torneo Clausura ==
=== Squad ===
Note: Flags indicate national team as defined under FIFA eligibility rules; some limited exceptions apply. Players may hold more than one non-FIFA nationality.

No.	Pos.	Nation	Player
1	GK	MEX	Oswaldo Sánchez (Captain)
3	FW	COL	Carlos Darwin Quintero
4	DF	MEX	Jorge Iván Estrada
5	DF	MEX	Aarón Galindo
6	MF	ESP	Marc Crosas
8	MF	MEX	Juan Pablo Rodríguez (Vice-Captain)
9	FW	MEX	Carlos Ochoa
10	MF	MEX	Daniel Ludueña
12	DF	MEX	José León Hoyo
13	FW	ECU	Christian Suárez
14	DF	MEX	César Ibáñez
15	MF	MEX	Jaime Toledo
16	FW	USA	Herculez Gomez

No.	Pos.	Nation	Player
17	MF	MEX	Rodolfo Salinas
18	DF	ARG	Santiago Hoyos
19	DF	MEX	Rafael Figueroa
20	DF	MEX	Osmar Mares
23	DF	PAN	Felipe Baloy
24	FW	MEX	Oribe Peralta
25	GK	MEX	Miguel Becerra
27	DF	MEX	José Antonio Olvera
28	DF	MEX	Carlos Adrián Morales
29	FW	MEX	Juan Carlos Enríquez
32	GK	MEX	Julio González
46	MF	MEX	Arnulfo González
65	FW	MEX	Alonso Escoboza

=== Out on loan ===
Note: Flags indicate national team as defined under FIFA eligibility rules; some limited exceptions apply. Players may hold more than one non-FIFA nationality.

No.	Pos.	Nation	Player
—	GK	MEX	Milton Aguilar (to Alacranes de Durango)
—	DF	MEX	Alejandro Martínez (to Lobos BUAP)
—	DF	URU	Jonathan Lacerda (to Puebla)
—	DF	MEX	Jorge Barrera (to Correcaminos)
—	DF	MEX	Juan Pablo Santiago (to Tijuana)
—	DF	MEX	Uriel Álvarez (to Veracruz)
—	DF	MEX	Jorge Alberto Campos (to Albinegros de Orizaba)
—	DF	MEX	Juan Carlos Arellano (to Leones Negros)
—	MF	MEX	Diego Armando Esqueda (to Leones Negros)

No.	Pos.	Nation	Player
—	MF	MEX	Francisco Javier Torres (to Atlas)
—	MF	MEX	Miguel Zepeda (to Leones Negros)
—	MF	MEX	Pedro Javier Jiménez (to Irapuato FC)
—	FW	MEX	Agustín Enrique Herrera (to Veracruz)
—	FW	MEX	Daniel Guzmán Jr (to Veracruz)
—	FW	USA	Gustavo Ruelas (to Chiapas)
—	FW	MEX	Joaquín Reyes (to Celaya)
—	FW	MEX	José Rodolfo Reyes (to Estudiantes Tecos)

=== Regular season ===
Win Draw Loss

==== Clausura 2012 results ====
January 7, 2012 Round 1	Santos Laguna	0 – 0	Pachuca	Estadio TSM Corona, Torreón
19:00	Rodríguez (yellow card) 68'; Ibáñez (yellow card) 81' (yellow-red card) 88'	Report	Cejas (yellow card) 12'; Ayoví (yellow card) 37'; Rodríguez (yellow card) 82'; Vidrio (yellow card) 87'	Referee: Miguel Ángel Flores

January 14, 2012 Round 2	Atlante	1 – 2	Santos Laguna	Estadio Andrés Quintana Roo, Cancún
21:00	Ricón (yellow card) 43'; Mendoza 52'; Arroyo (yellow card) 75'	Report	Suarez 13'; Quintero (yellow card) 41'; Peralta 56'; Salinas (yellow card) 59'; Sánchez (yellow card) 88'	Referee: Mauricio Morales

January 21, 2012 Round 3	Santos Laguna	1 – 0	Chiapas	Estadio TSM Corona, Torreón
19:00	Quintero (yellow card) 19'; Ramírez (yellow card) 79'; Galindo 86'	Report	Rey (yellow card) 52'; J. Hernández (yellow card) 65'	Referee: Óscar Macias

January 29, 2012 Round 4	Tijuana	1 – 3	Santos Laguna	Estadio Caliente, Tijuana
12:00	Arce (yellow card) 33'; Almazán (yellow card) 44'; Sand 56' (pen.); Gandolfi (yellow card) 64'; Riascos (yellow card) 67'; Corona (yellow card) 72'	Report	Quintero 36'; Estrada (yellow card) 50'; Peralta (yellow card) 53'; Suárez 65'; Rodríguez 70'	Referee: Jorge Isaac Rojas

February 4, 2012 Round 5	Santos Laguna	2 – 1	UNAM	Estadio TSM Corona, Torreón
19:00	Suárez 11'; Mares (yellow card) 40'; Peralta (yellow card) 49'; Salinas 65'; Quintero (yellow card) 88'	Report	Palacios (yellow card) 22'; Bravo (yellow card) 32'; Salinas 75' (o.g.); Velarde (yellow card) 79'; Verón (yellow card) 87'	Referee: Miguel Ángel Ortega

February 10, 2012 Round 6	Morelia	3 – 1	Santos Laguna	Estadio Morelos, Morelia
20:10	Sabah 22', 24', (yellow card) 49'; Ramírez (yellow card) 31'; Lugo 90+1'	Report	Rodríguez (yellow card) 21'; Aldrete 28' (o.g.); Ibañez (yellow card) 47'	Referee: Roberto García Orozco

February 19, 2012 Round 7	Santos Laguna	1 – 1	Monterrey	Estadio TSM Corona, Torreón
19:00	Sánchez (yellow card) 51'; Galindo 81'	Report	Mier (yellow card) 36'; Pérez 53'	Referee: César Arturo Ramos

February 26, 2012 Round 8	Guadalajara	2 – 1	Santos Laguna	Estadio Omnilife, Zapopan
16:00	Fabián (yellow card) 34', (goal) 37'; Reynoso (yellow card) 36'; Araujo (yellow card) 48'; Torres 57', (yellow card) 68'	Report	Baloy (yellow card) 45+'; Galindo (yellow card) 46'; Salinas (yellow card) 69'; Gómez 77'	Referee: Marco Antonio Rodríguez

March 3, 2012 Round 9	Santos Laguna	5 – 2	San Luis	Estadio TSM Corona, Torreón
19:00	Peralta 4', 17', 72', 79'; Ibañez (yellow card) 26'; Rodríguez (yellow card) 31'; Gómez (yellow card) 49', (goal) 54'	Report	Moreno (red card) 22'; Pereyra 22' (pen.); Aguirre 41'; Torres (yellow card) 70'; Matellán (yellow card) 77'	Referee: Jorge Antonio Pérez

March 10, 2012 Round 10	Santos Laguna	3 – 1	Puebla	Estadio TSM Corona, Torreón
19:00	Gómez 48', 90+2'; Suárez (yellow card) 37'; Peralta 71'	Report	Luis García (yellow card) 40'; Beasley 43'; Cervantes (yellow card) 53'; Durán (yellow card) 69'	Referee: Ricardo Arellano

March 16, 2012 Round 11	Cruz Azul	0 – 1	Santos Laguna	Estadio Azul, Mexico City
19:00	Pinto (yellow card) 7'	Report	Galindo (yellow card) 34' (yellow-red card) 90+3'; Quintero 42'; Ramírez (yellow card) 51'; Ibañez (yellow card) 55'; Ochoa (yellow card) 71'; Armedáriz (red card) 73'	Referee: Miguel Ángel Ortega

March 24, 2012 Round 12	Santos Laguna	2 – 0	Querétaro	Estadio TSM Corona, Torreón
19:00	Rodríguez 28' (pen.); Baloy (yellow card) 34'; Gómez 75'	Report	Martínez (yellow card) 7' (yellow-red card) 48'; García Arias (yellow card) 26' (red card) 29'	Referee: Erim Ramírez

April 1, 2012 Round 13	Toluca	1 – 3	Santos Laguna	Estadio Nemesio Díez, Toluca
12:00	Sinha (yellow card) 41'; Ríos (yellow card) 42'; Torres (yellow card) 42'; D. de la Torre 66'; Novaretti (yellow card) 72' (yellow-red card) 75'	Report	Peralta 20'; Suárez 32'; Quintero 47'; Olivera (yellow card) 71'	Referee: Jorge Eduardo Gasso

April 7, 2012 Round 14	Santos Laguna	1 – 1	Estudiantes Tecos	Estadio TSM Corona, Torreón
19:00	Sánchez (yellow card) 6'; Quintero 17'; Baloy (yellow card) 53'; Peralta (red card) 54'; Hoyos (yellow card) 90+1'	Report	Leaño (yellow card) 17'; Bareiro 86'	Referee: Antony Zanjuampa

April 14, 2012 Round 15	América	3 – 1	Santos Laguna	Estadio Azteca, Mexico City
17:00	Medina (yellow card) 9'; Bermúdez 38'; Benítez 70'; Vuoso 77'	Report	Hoyos (yellow card) 12'; Ochoa 44'; Crosas (yellow card) 83'	Referee: Jorge Isaac Rojas

April 21, 2012 Round 16	Santos Laguna	3 – 0	UANL	Estadio TSM Corona, Torreón
19:00	Salinas 20'; Quintero 24'; Rodríguez 66' (pen.)	Report	Palos (yellow card) 64'; Ayala (yellow card) 90+2'	Referee: Jorge Antonio Pérez

April 28, 2012 Round 17	Atlas	1 – 3	Santos Laguna	Estadio Jalisco, Guadalajara
20:45	Cufré (yellow card) 15', (goal) 20' (pen.); Chávez (yellow card) 47'	Report	Peralta 2', 49'; Quintero 5'; Hoyos (yellow card) 12'	Referee: Francisco Chacón

=== Final phase ===
May 3, 2012 Quarter-finals	Chiapas	3 – 4	Santos Laguna	Estadio Victor Manuel Reyna, Tuxtla Gutiérrez
19:00	Rey 29'; J. Martínez 31', 74', (yellow card) 79'; J. Hernández (yellow card) 50'; Rodríguez (yellow card) 58'; Cipriano (yellow card) 69'	Report	Ludueña 24', 59'; Baloy (yellow card) 26'; Peralta 39'; Estrada (yellow card) 50'; Quintero 90+5'	Referee: José Alfredo Peñaloza

May 6, 2012 Quarter-finals	Santos Laguna	2 – 1	Chiapas	Estadio TSM Corona, Torreón
18:00	Quintero 14'; Peralta 37'	Report	Zamorano 7'; Arizala (yellow card) 48'; Fuentes (yellow card) 70'; J. Hernández (yellow card) 79'	Referee: Roberto García Orozco

Santos Laguna advanced 6–4 on aggregate

May 10, 2012 Semi-finals	UANL	1 – 1	Santos Laguna	Estadio Universitario, San Nicolás
20:00	Lobos 69'	Report	Rodríguez (yellow card) 5'; Estrada 62'; Salinas (yellow card) 75'	Referee: Francisco Chacón

May 13, 2012 Semi-finals	Santos Laguna	2 – 2	UANL	Estadio TSM Corona, Torreón
20:00	Baloy (yellow card) 51'; Quintero (yellow card) 65'; Peralta 86', 89'	Report	Mancilla 6', 26'; Juninho (yellow card) 46'; Dueñas (yellow card) 83'	Referee: Marco Antonio Rodríguez

Santos Laguna advanced 3–3 on aggregate due to being the higher seed in the classification phase

May 17, 2012 Final	Monterrey	1 – 1	Santos Laguna	Estadio Tecnológico, Monterrey
21:00	Suazo 90+3'	Report	Quintero (yellow card) 19'; Ludueña (yellow card) 52'; Baloy (yellow card) 59'; Crosas (yellow card) 60'; Peralta 69'; Estrada (yellow card) 75'; Sánchez (yellow card) 86'	Referee: Mauricio Morales

May 20, 2012 Final	Santos Laguna	2 – 1	Monterrey	Estadio TSM Corona, Torreón
20:00	Ludueña 6'; Peralta 64'; Quintero (yellow card) 88'	Report	de Nigris (yellow card) 20', (goal) 78'; Suazo (yellow card) 35'	Referee: Roberto García Orozco

Santos Laguna won 3–2 on aggregate

Santos Laguna won their fourth league title in history

=== Goalscorers ===
==== Regular season ====
Position	Nation	Name	Goals scored
1.	(Mexico)	Oribe Peralta	9
2.	(Colombia)	Carlos Quintero	6
3.	(United States)	Herculez Gómez	5
4.	(Ecuador)	Cristian Suárez	4
5.	(Mexico)	Juan Pablo Rodríguez	3
6.	(Mexico)	Aarón Galindo	2
6.	(Mexico)	Rodolfo Salinas	2
8.	(Mexico)	Carlos Ochoa	1
8.		Own Goals	1
TOTAL			33

==== Final phase ====
Position	Nation	Name	Goals scored
1.	(Mexico)	Oribe Peralta	6
2.	(Mexico)	Daniel Ludueña	3
3.	(Colombia)	Carlos Quintero	2
4.	(Mexico)	Jorge Iván Estrada	1
TOTAL			12

=== Results ===
==== Results summary ====
Overall								Home						Away					
Pld	W	D	L	GF	GA	GD	Pts	W	D	L	GF	GA	GD	W	D	L	GF	GA	GD
17	11	3	3	33	18	+15	36	6	3	0	18	6	+12	5	0	3	15	12	+3

Last updated: 28 April 2012.
Source: Clausura 2012 results

==== Results by round ====
Round	1	2	3	4	5	6	7	8	9	10	11	12	13	14	15	16	17
Ground	H	A	H	A	H	A	H	A	H	H	A	H	A	H	A	H	A
Result	D	W	W	W	W	L	D	L	W	W	W	W	W	D	L	W	W
Position	10	8	3	1	1	2	3	6	4	1	1	1	1	1	2	1	1

Updated to match(es) played on 28 April 2012. Source: Clausura 2012 results and mediotiempo.com
A = Away; H = Home; W = Win; D = Draw; L = Loss

== CONCACAF Champions League ==
=== Preliminary round ===
July 27, 2011 1	Santos Laguna (Mexico)	3 – 1	(Honduras) Olimpia	Estadio Corona, Torreón
22:00	Peralta 29'; Rodríguez 61' (pen.); Quintero 63'	Report	Bekeles 66'	Attendance: 7,500; Referee: Joel Aguilar (El Salvador)

August 3, 2011 2	Olimpia (Honduras)	2 – 1	(Mexico) Santos Laguna	Estadio Tiburcio Carías Andino, Tegucigalpa
22:00	Rojas 15'; Bekeles 86'	Report	Suárez 13'	Referee: Jair Marrufo (United States)

Santos Laguna won 4–3 on aggregate.

=== Group standings ===
Team	Pld	W	D	L	GF	GA	GD	Pts
(Mexico) Santos Laguna	6	4	1	1	16	6	+10	13
(El Salvador) Isidro Metapán	6	3	0	3	10	15	−5	9
(United States) Colorado Rapids	6	2	1	3	9	12	−3	7
(Honduras) Real España	6	1	2	3	9	11	−2	5

=== Group Stage results ===
August 16, 2011 Group 1	Santos Laguna (Mexico)	3 – 2	(Honduras) Real España	Estadio Corona, Torreón
20:00	Enríquez 28'; Bica 51' (o.g.); Suárez 74'	Report	Delgado 42'; Lalín 68'	Attendance: 5,500; Referee: Wálter Quesada (Costa Rica)

August 24, 2011 Group 2	Isidro Metapán (El Salvador)	2 – 0	(Mexico) Santos Laguna	Estadio Jorge Calero Suárez, Metapán
22:00	Suárez 45'; Bautista 52'	Report		Attendance: 3,260; Referee: Raymond Bogle (Jamaica)

September 13, 2011 Group 3	Colorado Rapids (United States)	1 – 4	(Mexico) Santos Laguna	Dick's Sporting Goods Park, Commerce City
22:00	Mullan 77'	Report	Ludueña 14'; Peralta 27'; Quintero 64'; Suárez 71'	Attendance: 9,760; Referee: Roberto Moreno (Panama)

September 22, 2011 Group 4	Santos Laguna (Mexico)	6 – 0	(El Salvador) Isidro Metapán	Estadio Corona, Torreón
20:00	Cárdenas 21'; Quintero 28', 55'; Peralta 38', 86'; Ochoa 79'	Report		Attendance: 5,500; Referee: David Gantar (Canada)

September 28, 2011 Group 5	Real España (Honduras)	1 – 1	(Mexico) Santos Laguna	Estadio Francisco Morazán, San Pedro Sula
20:00	Mario Martínez 61'	Report	Ochoa 51'	Attendance: 6,296; Referee: Elmar Rodas (Guatemala)

October 19, 2011 Group 6	Santos Laguna (Mexico)	2 – 0	(United States) Colorado Rapids	Estadio Corona, Torreón
20:00	Galindo 55'; Escoboza 67'	Report		Referee: Courtney Campbell (Jamaica)

=== Quarter-finals ===
March 7, 2012 Quarter-final	Seattle Sounders FC (United States)	2 – 1	(Mexico) Santos Laguna	CenturyLink Field, Seattle
22:00	Estrada 12'; Hurtado (yellow card) 33'; González (yellow card) 58'; Evans 63'	Report	Rodríguez (yellow card) 28'; Mares (yellow card) 29'; Gomez 61'; Sánchez (yellow card) 65'; Hoyos (yellow card) 80'	Attendance: 23,433

March 14, 2012 Quarter-final	Santos Laguna (Mexico)	6 – 1	(United States) Seattle Sounders FC	Estadio Corona, Torreón
20:00	Suárez 8', 76'; Peralta 10'; Gomez 49', 68'; Ochoa 81'	Report	Fernández 37'	Attendance: 14,278; Referee: Joel Aguilar (El Salvador)

Santos Laguna won 7–3 on aggregate.

=== Semifinals ===
March 28, 2012 Semifinal	Toronto FC (Canada)	1 – 1	(Mexico) Santos Laguna	BMO Field, Toronto
20:00		Report

April 4, 2012 Semifinal	Santos Laguna (Mexico)	6 – 2	(Canada) Toronto FC	Estadio Corona, Torreón
20:00		Report

=== Final ===
April 25, 2012 Final	Monterrey (Mexico)	2 – 0	(Mexico) Santos Laguna	Estadio Tecnológico, Monterrey
22:00	Suazo 60', 86'	Report		Attendance: 29,300; Referee: Francisco Chacón (Mexico)

April 18, 2012 Final	Santos Laguna (Mexico)	2 – 1	(Mexico) Monterrey	Estadio Corona, Torreón
22:00	Ludueña 45+3'; Peralta 51'	Report	Cardozo 82'	Attendance: 28,000; Referee: Roberto García (Mexico)

Monterrey won 3–2 on aggregate

=== Goalscorers ===
Position	Nation	Name	Goals scored
1.	(Mexico)	Oribe Peralta	7
2.	(United States)	Herculez Gomez	6
3.	(Ecuador)	Cristian Suárez	5
4.	(Colombia)	Carlos Quintero	4
5.	(Argentina)	Daniel Ludueña	3
5.	(Mexico)	Carlos Ochoa	3
5.	(Mexico)	Juan Pablo Rodríguez	3
8.	(Mexico)	José María Cárdenas	1
8.	(Mexico)	Juan Carlos Enríquez	1
8.	(Mexico)	Alonso Escoboza	1
8.	(Mexico)	Aarón Galindo	1
8.		Own Goals	1
TOTAL			33
