= 2011 Mexican Primera División Championship Round (Apertura) =

2011 Primera División de México
Tournament details
- Country: Mexico
- Teams: 8

Final positions
- Champions: UANL
- Runner-up: Santos Laguna

Tournament statistics
- Matches played: 14
- Goals scored: 34 (2.43 per match)
- Top goal scorer(s): (Mexico) Oribe Peralta (3)

The Liguilla (English: Little League) of the 2011 Primera División de México Apertura is a final knockout tournament involving eight teams of the Primera División de México. The tournament will begin on November 19, 2011, and will end on December 11, 2011. The winners and runners-up of the competition will qualify for the 2012–13 CONCACAF Champions League.

== Teams ==
In a change from previous seasons, the 18 teams in the 2011 Apertura were not divided into three groups of six teams each. Instead, the eight best teams in the general table qualified for the competition.

S	Team	Manager	Captain	Performance at the 2011 Apertura							
S	Team	Manager	Captain	Pld	W	D	L	GF	GA	GD	Pts
1	Guadalajara	(Mexico) Fernando Quirarte	(Mexico) Héctor Reynoso	17	8	6	3	24	18	+6	30
2	Cruz Azul	(Mexico) Enrique Meza	(Mexico) Gerardo Torrado	17	8	5	4	21	14	+7	29
3	UANL	(Brazil) Ricardo Ferretti	(Argentina) Lucas Lobos	17	7	7	3	22	13	+9	28
4	Santos Laguna	(Mexico) Benjamín Galindo	(Mexico) Oswaldo Sánchez	17	8	3	6	29	25	+4	27
5	Chiapas	(Mexico) José Guadalupe Cruz	(Chile) Ismael Fuentes	17	7	5	5	28	23	+5	26
6	Pachuca	(Mexico) Efraín Flores	(Mexico) Leobardo López	17	7	5	5	28	25	+3	26
7	Morelia	(Mexico) Tomás Boy	(Argentina) Federico Vilar	17	7	5	5	25	22	+3	26
8	Querétaro	(Paraguay) José Cardozo	(Uruguay) Carlos Bueno	17	8	2	7	23	21	+2	26

== Bracket ==
The eight qualified teams play two games against each other on a home-and-away basis. The winner of each match up is determined by aggregate score.

The teams were seeded one to eight in quarterfinals, and will be re-seeded one to four in semifinals, depending on their position in the general table. The higher seeded teams play on their home field during the second leg.

Quarterfinals
1	Guadalajara	1	0	1
8	Querétaro	2	0	2
3	UANL	1	3	4
6	Pachuca	0	0	0
2	Cruz Azul	1	1	2
7	Morelia	2	2	4
4	Santos Laguna	2	2	4
5	Chiapas	2	1	3

Semifinals
8	Querétaro	0	0	0
3	UANL	0	1	1
7	Morelia	2	2	4
4	Santos Laguna	1	3	4

Finals
3	UANL	1	3	4
4	Santos Laguna	0	1	1

- If the two teams are tied after both legs, the higher seeded team advances.
- Both finalist qualify to the 2012–13 CONCACAF Champions League Group Stage.

== Quarter-finals ==
The first legs of the quarterfinals were played on November 19 and 20. The second legs were played on November 26 and 27.

Team 1	Agg.	Team 2	1st leg	2nd leg
Querétaro (8)	2 – 1	(1) Guadalajara	2 – 1	0 – 0
Morelia (7)	4 – 2	(2) Cruz Azul	2 – 1	2 – 1
Pachuca (6)	0 – 4	(3) UANL	0 – 1	0 – 3
Chiapas (5)	3 – 4	(4) Santos Laguna	2 – 2	1 – 2

Kickoffs are given in local time (UTC-6 unless stated otherwise).

=== First leg ===
November 19, 2011	Morelia	2 – 1	Cruz Azul	Estadio Morelos, Morelia
19:00	Márquez 78', 85'	Report	32' Orozco; (red card) 70' Pinto	Referee: Erim Ramírez

November 19, 2011	Querétaro	2 – 1	Guadalajara	Estadio Corregidora, Querétaro
17:00	Bueno 9', 70'	Report	90+2' Enríquez	Referee: Fernando Guerrero

November 20, 2011	Chiapas	2 – 2	Santos Laguna	Estadio Víctor Manuel Reyna, Tuxtla Gutiérrez
16:00	J. Martínez 84'; Arizala 92'	Report	4' Baloy; 32' Peralta; (red card) 71' Cárdenas	Referee: Ricardo Arellano

November 20, 2011	Pachuca	0 – 1	UANL	Estadio Hidalgo, Pachuca
18:00		Report	26' Mancilla; (red card) 62' Salcido	Referee: Paul Delgadillo

=== Second leg ===
November 26, 2011	Cruz Azul	1 – 2	Morelia	Estadio Azul, Mexico City
17:00	Vela 37'; Torrado (yellow card) 71' (yellow-red card)	Report	17' Sabah; 22' Lugo	Referee: Marco Antonio Rodriguez

November 26, 2011	Guadalajara	0 – 0	Querétaro	Estadio Omnilife, Zapopan
19:00		Report		Referee: Mauricio Morales

November 27, 2011	Santos Laguna	2 – 1	Chiapas	Estadio Corona, Torreón
17:00	Quintero 41'; Ludueña 73'	Report	66' J. Martínez	Referee: Roberto García Orozco

November 27, 2011	UANL	3 – 0	Pachuca	Estadio Universitario, San Nicolás
19:00	Viniegra 11'; Lobos 26'; Álvarez 36'	Report	(yellow card) 28' (yellow-red card) 61' Herrera	Referee: Francisco Chacón

== Semi-finals ==
The first legs of the semifinals were played on November 30 and December 1. The second legs were played on December 3 and 4.

Team 1	Agg.	Team 2	1st leg	2nd leg
Querétaro (8)	0 – 1	(3) UANL	0 – 0	0 – 1
Morelia (7)	4 – 4	(4) Santos Laguna	2 – 1	2 – 3

Kickoffs are given in local time (UTC-6 unless stated otherwise).

=== First leg ===
November 30, 2011	Morelia	2 – 1	Santos Laguna	Estadio Morelos, Morelia
20:30	Lozano 13'; Lugo 25'	Report	83' Peralta; (yellow card) 57' (yellow-red card) 87' Mares	Referee: Paul Delgadillo

December 1, 2011	Querétaro	0 – 0	UANL	Estadio Corregidora, Querétaro
19:00		Report		Referee: Roberto García Orozco

=== Second leg ===
December 3, 2011	Santos Laguna	3 – 2	Morelia	Estadio Corona, Torreón
19:00	Rodríguez 34' (pen.); Suárez 52', 64'	Report	(red card) 33' Huiqui; 74', 87' Sepúlveda; (red card) 90+1' Leão	Referee: Marco Antonio Rodríguez Moreno

December 4, 2011	UANL	1 – 0	Querétaro	Estadio Universitario, San Nicolás
18:00	López Mondragón 44' (o.g.)	Report	(red card) 90+3' Vázquez	Referee: Francisco Chacón

== Final ==
The first leg of the final will be played on December 8, the second leg on December 11.

Team 1	Agg.	Team 2	1st leg	2nd leg
UANL (3)	4 – 1	(4) Santos Laguna	1 – 0	3 – 1

Kickoffs are given in local time (UTC-6 unless stated otherwise).

=== First leg ===
December 8, 2011	Santos Laguna	0 – 1	UANL	Estadio Corona, Torreón
20:30	Sánchez (yellow card) 23'; Rodríguez (red card) 23'; Estrada (yellow card) 29'; Morales (yellow card) 59'; Baloy (yellow card) 81'	Report	7' Álvarez	Attendance: 30,000; Referee: Paul Delgadillo

=== Second leg ===
December 11, 2011	UANL	3 – 1	Santos Laguna	Estadio Universitario, San Nicolás
18:00	Torres (yellow card) 36'; Lobos (yellow card) 38'; Mancilla 52'; Mancilla (yellow card) 56'; Danilinho 63'; Jiménez (red card) 69'; Pulido 87'	Report	(red card) 12' Sánchez; (yellow card) 19' Salinas; 30' Peralta; (yellow card) 66' Morales; (red card) 69' Baloy; (yellow card) 70' Quintero	Attendance: 43,000; Referee: Marco Antonio Rodríguez

Apertura 2011 winners:
Tigres UANL
3rd Title
