= Droguett =

Droguett is a surname. Notable people with the surname include:

- Arturo Droguett, Chilean physician and politician
- Carlos Droguett, Chilean writer
- Héctor Droguett (1925–2004), Chilean cyclist
- Hugo Droguett (born 1982), Chilean football midfielder
- Jaime Droguett (born 1988), Chilean football forward
- Miguel Droguett (born 1961), Chilean cyclist
- Olga Bianchi Droguett, Argentine-Chilean activist

== See also ==
- Droguet, a surname
