= Primera División de México Clausura 2008 =

Primera División de México
- Season: 2007−08
- Champions: Santos Laguna (3rd title)
- Relegated: Veracruz
- Champions League: Santos Laguna; Cruz Azul
- Interliga: Cruz Azul; América; UNAM; Toluca; Monterrey; Morelia; San Luis; Atlas
- Copa Sudamericana: Guadalajara; San Luis
- SuperLiga: Guadalajara; Atlante; Santos; Pachuca
- Top goalscorer: Humberto Suazo (13 goals)

Primera División de México (Mexican First Division) Clausura 2008 was a Mexican football tournament - the second of two tournaments held in the 2007-08 season. It began January 18, 2008 and ran until June 1, 2008. Veracruz and Morelia inaugurated the season, with Morelia winning 1–0. Reigning champions Atlante F.C. were eliminated from making the Liguilla with a 3-2 loss to Monterrey and thus could not defend their title, and Veracruz was relegated to the Primera División A after finishing last on the percentage table. Six teams qualified directly to the Liguilla (playoffs) by finishing in the top two of their respective groups, and these are the teams of Toluca, Jaguares, Santos Laguna, Monterrey, Guadalajara, and Cruz Azul. Four teams advanced to what is known as the Repechaje (playoff qualifiers), and these are being San Luis, Pachuca, Necaxa, and Atlas.

On June 1, 2008 Santos Laguna beat Cruz Azul on 3-2 aggregate to win the Clausura 2008 trophy. This was the club's third championship victory.

== Clubs ==
Location of the Primera División Clausura 2006 teams

Team	City	Stadium
América	Mexico City	Azteca
Atlante	Cancún, Quintana Roo	Andrés Quintana Roo
Atlas	Guadalajara, Jalisco	Jalisco
Chiapas	Tuxtla Gutiérrez, Chiapas	Víctor Manuel Reyna
Cruz Azul	Mexico City	Azul
Guadalajara	Guadalajara, Jalisco	Jalisco
Morelia	Morelia, Michoacán	Morelos
Monterrey	Monterrey, Nuevo León	Tecnológico
Necaxa	Aguascalientes, Aguascalientes	Victoria
Pachuca	Pachuca, Hidalgo	Hidalgo
Pachuca	Puebla, Puebla	Cuauhtémoc
San Luis	San Luis Potosí, S.L.P.	Alfonso Lastras
Santos Laguna	Torreón, Coahuila	Corona
Toluca	Toluca, State of Mexico	Nemesio Díez
UAG	Zapopan, Jalisco	Tres de Marzo
UANL	San Nicolás de los Garza, Nuevo León	Universitario
UNAM	Mexico City	Olímpico Universitario
Veracruz	Veracruz, Veracruz	Luis "Pirata" Fuente

== Regular phase ==
Group 1
Pos	Team	Pld	W	D	L	GF	GA	GD	Pts	Qualification
1	Toluca	17	7	6	4	23	19	+4	27	Directly qualified for Liguilla (Playoffs)
2	Chiapas	17	7	5	5	23	19	+4	26	Directly qualified for Liguilla (Playoffs)
3	Pachuca	17	6	4	7	27	25	+2	22	Qualified for
4	Puebla	17	5	6	6	28	25	+3	21	
5	UNAM	17	5	5	7	21	26	−5	20	
6	UAG	17	4	5	8	17	29	−12	17	

Source: MedioTiempo

Group 2
Pos	Team	Pld	W	D	L	GF	GA	GD	Pts	Qualification or relegation
1	Santos Laguna	17	8	7	2	36	19	+17	31	Directly qualified for Liguilla (Playoffs)
2	Monterrey	17	6	6	5	27	22	+5	24	Directly qualified for Liguilla (Playoffs)
3	Atlas	17	6	5	6	21	24	−3	23	Qualified for Repechage
4	Atlante	17	3	8	6	24	30	−6	17	
5	Veracruz	17	4	5	8	22	29	−7	17	Relegation to Primera División A
6	América	17	3	2	12	12	27	−15	11	

Source: MedioTiempo

Group 3
Pos	Team	Pld	W	D	L	GF	GA	GD	Pts	Qualification
1	Guadalajara	17	9	6	2	32	14	+18	33	Directly qualified for Liguilla (Playoffs)
2	Cruz Azul	17	9	4	4	27	17	+10	31	Directly qualified for Liguilla (Playoffs)
3	San Luis	17	8	6	3	25	23	+2	30	Qualified for Repechage
4	Necaxa	17	5	9	3	18	12	+6	24	Qualified for Repechage
5	UANL	17	5	4	8	19	28	−9	19	
6	Morelia	17	5	3	9	11	25	−14	18	

Source: MedioTiempo

Last updated May 4, 2008

== League table ==
Pos	Team	Pld	W	D	L	GF	GA	GD	Pts	Qualification or relegation
1	Guadalajara (Q)	17	9	6	2	32	14	+18	33	Directly qualified for Liguilla (Playoffs)
2	Santos Laguna	17	8	7	2	36	19	+17	31	Directly qualified for Liguilla (Playoffs)
3	Cruz Azul	17	9	4	4	27	17	+10	31	Directly qualified for Liguilla (Playoffs)
4	San Luis (Q)	17	8	6	3	25	23	+2	30	Qualified for Repechage
5	Toluca	17	7	6	4	23	19	+4	27	Directly qualified for Liguilla (Playoffs)
6	Chiapas	17	7	5	5	23	19	+4	26	Directly qualified for Liguilla (Playoffs)
7	Necaxa	17	5	9	3	18	12	+6	24	Qualified for Repechage
8	Monterrey	17	6	6	5	27	22	+5	24	Directly qualified for Liguilla (Playoffs)
9	Atlas	17	6	5	6	21	24	−3	23	Qualified for Repechage
10	Pachuca	17	6	4	7	27	25	+2	22	Qualified for Repechage
11	Puebla	17	5	6	6	28	25	+3	21	
12	UNAM	17	5	5	7	21	26	−5	20	
13	UANL	17	5	4	8	19	28	−9	19	
14	Morelia	17	5	3	9	11	25	−14	18	
15	Atlante	17	3	8	6	24	30	−6	17	
16	Veracruz	17	4	5	8	22	29	−7	17	Relegation to Primera División A
17	UAG	17	4	5	8	17	29	−12	17	
18	América	17	3	2	12	12	27	−15	11	

Source: MedioTiempo
(Q) Qualified for 2008 Copa Sudamericana

== Top goalscorers ==
Players sorted first by goals scored, then by last name. Only regular season goals listed.

Rank	Player	Club	Goals
1	(Chile) Humberto Suazo	Monterrey	13
2	(Brazil) Itamar	Chiapas	10
2	(Argentina) Esteban Solari	UNAM	10
2	(Argentina) Vicente Matías Vuoso	Santos Laguna	10
5	(Mexico) Omar Bravo	Guadalajara	9
5	(Argentina) Claudio Graf	Veracruz	9
5	(Mexico) Sergio Santana	Guadalajara	9
8	(Ecuador) Christian Benítez	Santos Laguna	8
8	(Uruguay) Álvaro González	Puebla	8
10	(Venezuela) Giancarlo Maldonado	Atlante	7

Source: MedioTiempo

== Results ==
Home \ Away	AME	ATE	ATL	CHP	CAZ	GDL	MTY	MOR	NEC	PAC	PUE	SLP	SAN	TOL	TEC	UAN	UNA	VER
América		0–1	0–1	1–2	2–2	2–3	1–0	0–1	0–2	1–3	0–0	1–2	0–1	0–1	2–1	0–3	2–0	0–4
Atlante	1–0		3–3	2–2	2–3	1–1	2–3	2–0	1–1	0–2	2–2	0–2	0–3	2–2	1–2	1–1	2–1	2–2
Atlas	1–0	3–3		0–2	2–0	0–2	1–1	1–0	0–1	0–1	2–1	0–0	1–6	1–2	3–3	1–0	2–2	3–0
Chiapas	2–1	2–2	2–0		1–2	2–2	0–0	0–1	0–0	1–0	0–1	2–0	3–1	1–1	2–0	3–2	1–4	1–2
Cruz Azul	2–2	3–2	0–2	2–1		0–0	2–3	1–0	0–2	4–1	2–0	4–0	1–1	1–1	2–0	0–1	2–1	1–0
Guadalajara	3–2	1–1	2–0	2–2	0–0		0–1	6–0	0–1	2–1	4–0	2–2	3–2	1–0	1–1	0–0	3–0	2–1
Monterrey	0–1	3–2	1–1	0–0	3–2	1–0		1–0	1–1	1–1	1–1	1–3	0–2	1–1	3–0	2–3	1–2	7–2
Morelia	1–0	0–2	0–1	1–0	0–1	0–6	0–1		0–0	3–2	0–4	1–2	0–0	2–1	0–2	2–2	0–1	1–0
Necaxa	2–0	1–1	1–0	0–0	2–0	1–0	1–1	0–0		2–2	1–1	1–1	1–1	1–2	1–1	0–1	3–0	0–1
Pachuca	3–1	2–0	1–0	0–1	1–4	1–2	1–1	2–3	2–2		2–5	1–2	1–2	2–0	1–0	6–1	0–0	1–1
Puebla	0–0	2–2	1–2	1–0	0–2	0–4	1–1	4–0	1–1	5–2		1–2	3–3	1–2	2–3	3–0	1–1	2–0
San Luis	2–1	2–0	0–0	0–2	0–4	2–2	3–1	2–1	1–1	2–1	2–1		1–4	2–0	1–1	1–1	3–2	1–1
Santos	1–0	3–0	6–1	1–3	1–1	2–3	2–0	0–0	1–1	2–1	3–3	4–1		2–2	4–0	2–1	1–1	1–1
Toluca	1–0	2–2	2–1	1–1	1–1	0–1	1–1	1–2	2–1	0–2	2–1	0–2	2–2		3–0	2–0	0–0	3–2
Tecos	1–2	2–1	3–3	0–2	0–2	1–1	0–3	2–0	1–1	0–1	3–2	1–1	0–4	0–3		2–1	1–2	0–0
UANL	3–0	1–1	0–1	2–3	1–0	0–0	3–2	2–2	1–0	1–6	0–3	1–1	1–2	0–2	1–2		2–0	0–3
UNAM	0–2	1–2	2–2	4–1	1–2	0–3	2–1	1–0	0–3	0–0	1–1	2–3	1–1	0–0	2–1	0–2		4–2
Veracruz	4–0	2–2	0–3	2–1	0–1	1–2	2–7	0–1	1–0	1–1	0–2	1–1	1–1	2–3	0–0	3–0	2–4	

Legend: Blue = home team win; Yellow = draw; Red = away team win.

== Final phase (Liguilla) ==
=== Repechage ===
7 May 2008
19:30

Pachuca	0–1	San Luis
	Report	Coudet 90+2' (pen.)

Estadio Hidalgo, Pachuca
Referee: Fabricio Morales (Sinaloa)
10 May 2008
19:00

San Luis	1–2	Pachuca
Píriz 17'	Report	Caballero 65'; Giménez 90+2'

Estadio Alfonso Lastras, San Luis Potosí
Referee: Hugo León Guajardo (Mexico City)

2–2 on aggregate. San Luis advanced for being the higher seeded team.

8 May 2008
20:45

Atlas	1–1	Necaxa
Medina 71'	Report	Reyna 45'

Estadio Jalisco, Guadalajara
Referee: Mauricio Morales (Mexico City)
11 May 2008
16:00

Necaxa	0–0	Atlas
	Report

Estadio Victoria, Aguascalientes
Referee: José Gabriel Gómez (Morelos)

1–1 on aggregate. Necaxa advanced for being the higher seeded team.

=== Bracket ===
Quarterfinals
2	Santos Laguna	2	1	3
7	Necaxa	1	1	2
1	Guadalajara	1	4	5
8	Monterrey	4	4	8
3	Cruz Azul (s)	0	2	2
6	Chiapas	1	1	2
4	San Luis (s)	1	0	1
5	Toluca	1	0	1

Semifinals
2	Santos Laguna (s)	1	2	3
8	Monterrey	1	2	3
3	Cruz Azul	1	1	2
4	San Luis	0	1	1

Finals
2	Santos Laguna	2	1	3
3	Cruz Azul	1	1	2

=== Quarterfinals ===
14 May 2008
19:00

Chiapas	1–0	Cruz Azul
Itamar Batista 85'	Report

Estadio Víctor Manuel Reyna, Tuxtla Gutiérrez
Referee: Paul Delgadillo (Jalisco)
17 May 2007
17:00

Cruz Azul	2–1	Chiapas
Zeballos 71'; Sabah 73'	Report	Itamar Batista 48'

Estadio Azul, Mexico City
Referee: Hugo León Guajardo (Mexico City)

2–2 on aggregate. Cruz Azul advanced for being the higher seeded team.

14 May 2008
21:00

Monterrey	4–1	Guadalajara
Borgetti 44', 68', 74'; Suazo 45+3'	Report	Morales 7'

Estadio Tecnológico, Monterrey
Referee: Francisco Chacón (Michoacán)
17 May 2007
20:00

Guadalajara	4–4	Monterrey
Bravo 14'; Medina 27'; Ávila 63'; Magallón 88'	Report	Ochoa 21', 90+2'; Arellano 24'; Erviti 80'

Estadio Jalisco, Guadalajara
Referee: Armando Archundia (Estado de México)

Monterrey won 8–5 on aggregate.

15 May 2008
19:00

Toluca	1–1	San Luis
Fernández 90+2'	Report	Moreno 34'

Estadio Nemesio Díez, Toluca
Referee: José Gabriel Gómez (Morelos)
18 May 2008
12:00

San Luis	0–0	Toluca
	Report

Estadio Alfonso Lastras, San Luis Potosí
Referee: Roberto García Orozco (Mexico City)

2–2 on aggregate. San Luis advanced for being the higher seeded team.

15 May 2008
21:00

Necaxa	1–2	Santos Laguna
Rodallega 35'	Report	Ludueña 6'; Jiménez 85'

Estadio Victoria, Aguascalientes
Referee: Marco Antonio Rodríguez (Mexico City)
18 May 2018
17:00

Santos Laguna	1–1	Necaxa
Rodríguez 80' (pen.)	Report	Quatrocchi 57'

Estadio Corona, Torreón
Referee: Mauricio Morales (Mexico City)

Santos Laguna won 3–2 on aggregate.

=== Semifinals ===
21 May 2008
20:00

San Luis	0–1	Cruz Azul
	Report	Sabah 25'

Estadio Alfonso Lastras, San Luis Potosí
Referee: Francisco Chacón (Michoacán)
24 May 2008
17:00

Cruz Azul	1–1	San Luis
Zeballos 78'	Report	Coudet 31'

Estadio Azul, Mexico City
Referee: Marco Antonio Rodríguez (Mexico City)

Cruz Azul won 2–1 on aggregate.

22 May 2008
21:00

Monterrey	1–1	Santos Laguna
Suazo 10'	Report	Benítez 63'

Estadio Tecnológico, Monterrey
Referee: Armando Archundia (Estado de México)
25 May 2008
17:00

Santos Laguna	2–2	Monterrey
Vuoso 77'; Arce 90+3'	Report	Borgetti 53'; Suazo 63'

Estadio Corona, Torreón
Referee: Mauricio Morales (Mexico City)

3–3 on aggregate. Santos Laguna advanced for being the higher seeded team.

=== Finals ===
29 May 2008
20:00

Cruz Azul	1–2	Santos Laguna
Vigneri 15'	Report	Arce 60'; Benítez 85'

Estadio Azul, Mexico City
Referee: Marco Antonio Rodríguez (Mexico City)
1 June 2008
17:00

Santos Laguna	1–1	Cruz Azul
Ludueña 16'	Report	Lozano 82'

Estadio Corona, Torreón
Referee: Armando Archundia (Estado de México)

Santos Laguna won 3–2 on aggregate.

Champions

3rd title

Notes

By winning Clausura 2008, Santos earned a berth in the 2008–09 CONCACAF Champions League Group Stage.

By being the Clausura 2008 runner-up, Cruz Azul earned a berth in the 2008–09 CONCACAF Champions League Preliminary Round.

== Relegation ==
Pos	Team	Total Pts	Games	P/G
1	Cruz Azul	174	102	1.7059
2	Pachuca	170	102	1.6667
3	Guadalajara	163	102	1.5980
4	Toluca	161	102	1.5784
5	América	155	102	1.5196
6	San Luis	144	102	1.4118
7	Santos Laguna	140	102	1.3725
8	Chiapas	139	102	1.3627
9	Monterrey	137	102	1.3431
10	Atlante	136	102	1.3333
11	UNAM	131	102	1.2843
12	Necaxa	128	102	1.2549
13	Atlas	128	102	1.2549
14	Morelia	128	102	1.2549
15	UAG	118	102	1.1569
16	UANL	115	102	1.1275
17	Puebla	38	34	1.1176
18	Veracruz	108	102	1.0588
