= Droguet =

Droguet is a surname. Notable people with the surname include:

- Aubane Droguet (born 2002), French tennis player
- Titouan Droguet (born 2001), French tennis player

== See also ==
- Droguett, a surname
