= Primera División de México Apertura 2007 =

Primera División de México
- Season: 2007−08
- Champions: Atlante (3rd title)
- Champions' Cup: Atlante
- Champions League: Atlante; UNAM
- Copa Libertadores: Guadalajara; America; Atlas (First Stage)
- SuperLiga: Morelia; Pachuca; America; Guadalajara
- Top goalscorer: Alfredo Moreno (18 goals)

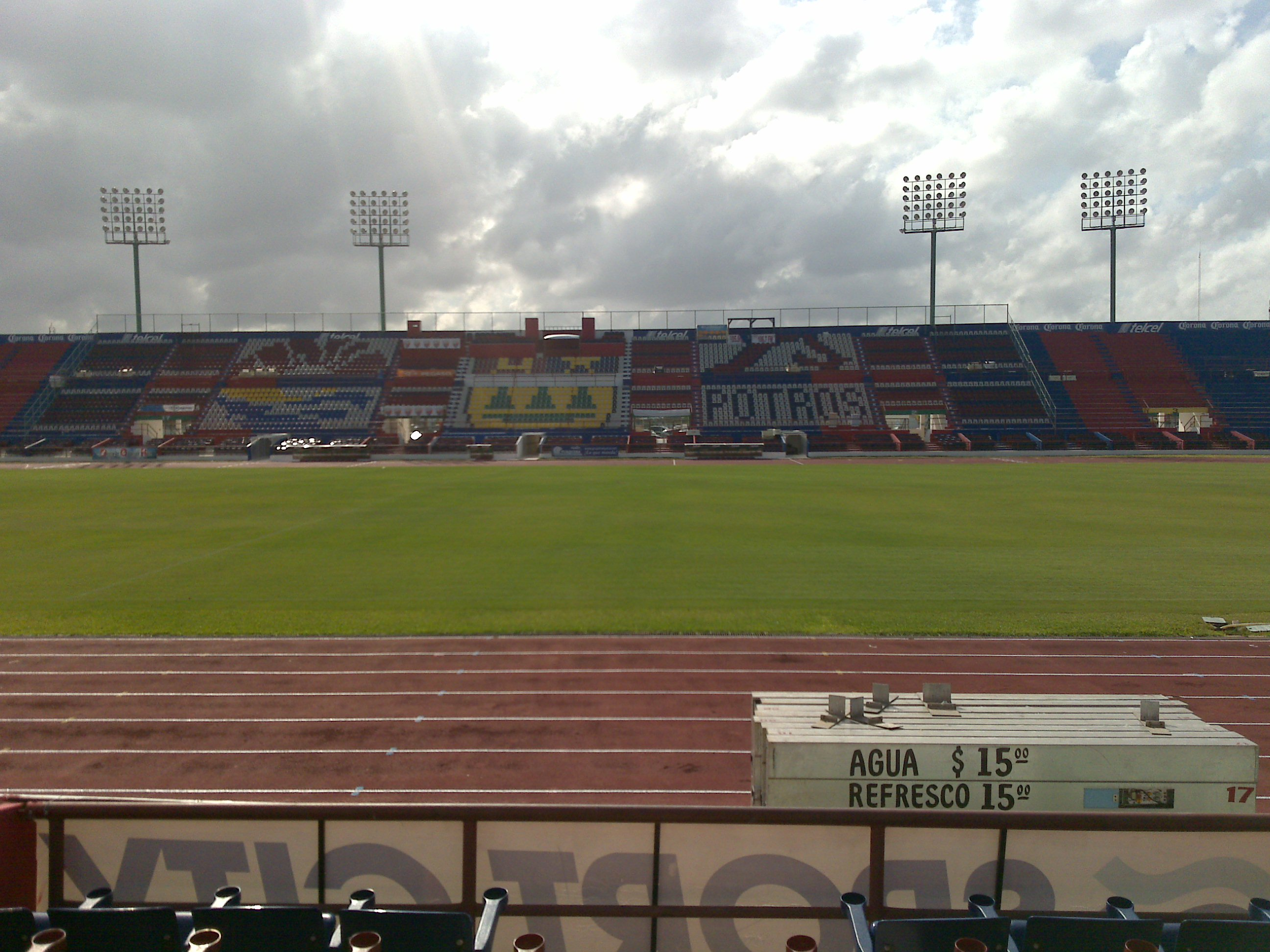

Primera División de México (Mexican First Division) Apertura 2007 is a Mexican football tournament - one of two shorter tournaments that together make up the Mexican football season - to determine the champion(s) of Mexican football. It began on Friday, August 3, 2007. On June 10, 2007, FMF General Secretary Decio de Maria revealed the groups for the upcoming tournament. Reigning champions Pachuca were eliminated in Repechaje by Cruz Azul by a double leg aggregate score of 6-0 (0–2 in the first leg, 4–0 in the second leg) and thus could not retain their title. Puebla was promoted to the Primera División de México after they beat Sinaloa in the ascension final thus, Querétaro was relegated to the Primera División A. This is the first time they are taking part in a Primera División tournament since they were relegated after Clausura 2005. Atlante made the move to Cancún, Quintana Roo, and played in the Estadio Andrés Quintana Roo after having played in Estádio Azteca for over a decade. At their new home, on December 9, 2007, Atlante won the Apertura 2007 by defeating UNAM 2–1 on aggregate. It was Atlante's third title.

== Clubs ==
Location of the Primera División Clausura 2006 teams

| Team | City | Stadium |
|---|---|---|
| América | Mexico City | Azteca |
| Atlante | Cancún, Quintana Roo | Andrés Quintana Roo |
| Atlas | Guadalajara, Jalisco | Jalisco |
| Chiapas | Tuxtla Gutiérrez, Chiapas | Víctor Manuel Reyna |
| Cruz Azul | Mexico City | Azul |
| Guadalajara | Guadalajara, Jalisco | Jalisco |
| Morelia | Morelia, Michoacán | Morelos |
| Monterrey | Monterrey, Nuevo León | Tecnológico |
| Necaxa | Aguascalientes, Aguascalientes | Victoria |
| Pachuca | Pachuca, Hidalgo | Hidalgo |
| Pachuca | Puebla, Puebla | Cuauhtémoc |
| San Luis | San Luis Potosí, S.L.P. | Alfonso Lastras |
| Santos Laguna | Torreón, Coahuila | Corona |
| Toluca | Toluca, State of Mexico | Nemesio Díez |
| UAG | Zapopan, Jalisco | Tres de Marzo |
| UANL | San Nicolás de los Garza, Nuevo León | Universitario |
| UNAM | Mexico City | Olímpico Universitario |
| Veracruz | Veracruz, Veracruz | Luis "Pirata" Fuente |

== Regular phase ==
Group 1
| Pos | Team | Pld | W | D | L | GF | GA | GD | Pts | Qualification |
|---|---|---|---|---|---|---|---|---|---|---|
| 1 | Toluca | 17 | 10 | 4 | 3 | 27 | 16 | +11 | 34 | Directly qualified to the Liguilla (Playoffs) |
| 2 | UNAM | 17 | 6 | 6 | 5 | 32 | 19 | +13 | 24 | Directly qualified to the Liguilla (Playoffs) |
| 3 | Pachuca | 17 | 7 | 3 | 7 | 26 | 23 | +3 | 24 | Qualified for the Repechage |
| 4 | Chiapas | 17 | 3 | 9 | 5 | 22 | 28 | −6 | 18 | |
| 5 | Puebla | 17 | 4 | 5 | 8 | 16 | 24 | −8 | 17 | |
| 6 | UAG | 17 | 5 | 2 | 10 | 24 | 38 | −14 | 17 | |

Source: MedioTiempo

Group 2
| Pos | Team | Pld | W | D | L | GF | GA | GD | Pts | Qualification |
|---|---|---|---|---|---|---|---|---|---|---|
| 1 | Santos Laguna | 17 | 11 | 5 | 1 | 40 | 22 | +18 | 38 | Directly qualified to the Liguilla (Playoffs) |
| 2 | Atlante | 17 | 9 | 6 | 2 | 32 | 19 | +13 | 33 | Directly qualified to the Liguilla (Playoffs) |
| 3 | América | 17 | 7 | 5 | 5 | 26 | 22 | +4 | 26 | Qualified for the Repechage |
| 4 | Veracruz | 17 | 5 | 3 | 9 | 20 | 35 | −15 | 18 | |
| 5 | Monterrey | 17 | 3 | 5 | 9 | 18 | 25 | −7 | 14 | |
| 6 | Atlas | 17 | 3 | 3 | 11 | 23 | 33 | −10 | 12 | |

Source: MedioTiempo

Group 3
| Pos | Team | Pld | W | D | L | GF | GA | GD | Pts | Qualification |
|---|---|---|---|---|---|---|---|---|---|---|
| 1 | Guadalajara | 17 | 9 | 4 | 4 | 28 | 16 | +12 | 31 | Directly qualified to the Liguilla (Playoffs) |
| 2 | San Luis | 17 | 8 | 5 | 4 | 31 | 30 | +1 | 29 | Directly qualified to the Liguilla (Playoffs) |
| 3 | Cruz Azul | 17 | 7 | 4 | 6 | 27 | 22 | +5 | 25 | Qualified for the Repechage |
| 4 | Morelia | 17 | 6 | 4 | 7 | 20 | 25 | −5 | 22 | Qualified for the Repechage |
| 5 | Necaxa | 17 | 5 | 5 | 7 | 23 | 32 | −9 | 20 | |
| 6 | UANL | 17 | 4 | 4 | 9 | 16 | 22 | −6 | 16 | |

Source: MedioTiempo

== League table ==
| Pos | Team | Pld | W | D | L | GF | GA | GD | Pts | Qualification |
|---|---|---|---|---|---|---|---|---|---|---|
| 1 | Santos Laguna | 17 | 11 | 5 | 1 | 40 | 22 | +18 | 38 | Directly qualified to the Liguilla (Playoffs) |
| 2 | Toluca | 17 | 10 | 4 | 3 | 27 | 16 | +11 | 34 | Directly qualified to the Liguilla (Playoffs) |
| 3 | Atlante | 17 | 9 | 6 | 2 | 32 | 19 | +13 | 33 | Directly qualified to the Liguilla (Playoffs) |
| 4 | Guadalajara | 17 | 9 | 4 | 4 | 28 | 16 | +12 | 31 | Directly qualified to the Liguilla (Playoffs) |
| 5 | San Luis | 17 | 8 | 5 | 4 | 31 | 30 | +1 | 29 | Directly qualified to the Liguilla (Playoffs) |
| 6 | América | 17 | 7 | 5 | 5 | 26 | 22 | +4 | 26 | Qualified for the Repechage |
| 7 | Cruz Azul | 17 | 7 | 4 | 6 | 27 | 22 | +5 | 25 | Qualified for the Repechage |
| 8 | UNAM | 17 | 6 | 6 | 5 | 32 | 19 | +13 | 24 | Directly qualified to the Liguilla (Playoffs) |
| 9 | Pachuca | 17 | 7 | 3 | 7 | 26 | 23 | +3 | 24 | Qualified for the Repechage |
| 10 | Morelia | 17 | 6 | 4 | 7 | 20 | 25 | −5 | 22 | Qualified for the Repechage |
| 11 | Necaxa | 17 | 5 | 5 | 7 | 23 | 32 | −9 | 20 | |
| 12 | Chiapas | 17 | 3 | 9 | 5 | 22 | 28 | −6 | 18 | |
| 13 | Veracruz | 17 | 5 | 3 | 9 | 20 | 35 | −15 | 18 | |
| 14 | Puebla | 17 | 4 | 5 | 8 | 16 | 24 | −8 | 17 | |
| 15 | UAG | 17 | 5 | 2 | 10 | 24 | 38 | −14 | 17 | |
| 16 | UANL | 17 | 4 | 4 | 9 | 16 | 22 | −6 | 16 | |
| 17 | Monterrey | 17 | 3 | 5 | 9 | 18 | 25 | −7 | 14 | |
| 18 | Atlas | 17 | 3 | 3 | 11 | 23 | 33 | −10 | 12 | |

Source: MedioTiempo

== Top goalscorers ==
Players sorted first by goals scored, then by last name. Only regular season goals listed.

| Rank | Player | Club | Goals |
|---|---|---|---|
| 1 | (Argentina) Alfredo Moreno | San Luis | 18 |
| 2 | (Venezuela) Giancarlo Maldonado | Atlante | 15 |
| 3 | (Argentina) Esteban Solari | UNAM | 14 |
| 4 | (Argentina) Daniel Ludueña | Santos Laguna | 13 |
| 5 | (Mexico) Miguel Sabah | Cruz Azul | 11 |
| 6 | (Argentina) Bruno Marioni | Atlas | 10 |
| 7 | (Paraguay) Salvador Cabañas | América | 9 |
| 7 | (Chile) Hugo Droguett | UAG | 9 |
| 7 | (Colombia) Hugo Rodallega | Necaxa | 9 |
| 7 | (Uruguay) Vicente Sánchez | Toluca | 9 |

Source: MedioTiempo

== Results ==
| Home \ Away | AMÉ | ATE | ATL | CAZ | CHI | GUA | MOR | MTY | NEX | PAC | PUE | SAN | SLU | TOL | UAG | UNL | UNM | VER |
|---|---|---|---|---|---|---|---|---|---|---|---|---|---|---|---|---|---|---|
| América | | | 2–1 | 2–2 | 6–1 | 2–1 | | | 1–0 | | | | | | 4–1 | 1–1 | | 0–0 |
| Atlante | 2–1 | | | | | | | | 0–2 | 1–2 | 4–0 | 2–2 | 4–3 | 2–0 | | | 1–0 | |
| Atlas | | 1–2 | | | 0–1 | | | 2–2 | | 0–1 | | 2–5 | 1–1 | 1–1 | 3–2 | | | |
| Cruz Azul | | 2–2 | 2–0 | | 1–1 | | | 2–1 | 3–0 | 1–2 | | | | 3–1 | 1–2 | 1–0 | | |
| Chiapas | | 1–1 | | | | | 1–1 | 0–0 | | 0–2 | | 2–2 | 2–2 | 0–0 | | | 1–2 | |
| Guadalajara | | 1–1 | 3–1 | 1–0 | 5–4 | | | 1–0 | 5–1 | | | | | | 0–0 | 1–0 | | 3–1 |
| Morelia | 2–1 | 1–1 | 0–2 | 2–1 | | 1–0 | | | | | 2–0 | | | | | 1–0 | 0–3 | 1–1 |
| Monterrey | 0–1 | 1–1 | | | | | 1–2 | | | 3–1 | 2–0 | 1–1 | 2–3 | 1–1 | | | 1–0 | |
| Necaxa | | | 2–4 | | 1–1 | | 1–1 | 3–2 | | | 2–1 | 2–3 | | | 1–1 | 1–0 | 1–1 | |
| Pachuca | 1–2 | | | | | 1–2 | 3–1 | | 1–1 | | 0–0 | 0–1 | 4–1 | 1–2 | | | 1–1 | |
| Puebla | 0–0 | | 1–0 | 1–1 | 1–2 | 0–3 | | | | | | | | | 3–0 | 3–0 | | 0–0 |
| Santos | 4–0 | | | 2–0 | | 2–1 | 3–2 | | | | 4–1 | | | | | 0–0 | 3–2 | 2–0 |
| San Luis | 2–1 | | | 3–1 | | 0–0 | 2–1 | | 3–2 | | 0–3 | 2–2 | | | | | 3–2 | 2–1 |
| Toluca | 3–1 | | | | | 1–0 | 2–0 | | 4–0 | | 2–0 | 2–3 | 2–1 | | | | 0–0 | 2–1 |
| UAG | | 0–3 | | | 2–1 | | 3–2 | 3–0 | | 1–4 | | 3–1 | 2–3 | 2–3 | | | | |
| UANL | | 2–3 | 3–2 | | 1–1 | | | 1–0 | | 3–2 | | | 0–0 | 0–1 | 4–0 | | | |
| UNAM | 1–1 | | 3–2 | 1–2 | | 1–1 | | | | | 2–2 | | | | 2–0 | 3–0 | | 8–0 |
| Veracuz | | 0–2 | 2–1 | 1–4 | 1–3 | | | 3–1 | 1–3 | 3–0 | | | | | 3–2 | 2–1 | | |

Updated to match(es) played on January 23, 2007. Source:
Legend: Blue = home team win; Yellow = draw; Red = away team win.

== Final phase (Liguilla) ==
=== Repechage ===
14 November 2007
19:10

| Pachuca | 0–2 | Cruz Azul |
|---|---|---|
| | Report | Domínguez 5', 60' |

Estadio Hidalgo, Pachuca
Referee: Fabricio Morales (Sinaloa)
17 November 2007
17:00

| Cruz Azul | 4–0 | Pachuca |
|---|---|---|
| Delgado 13'; Borgetti 31'; Núñez 64', 67' | Report |

Estadio Azul, Mexico City
Referee: Marco Antonio Rodríguez (Mexico City)

Cruz Azul won 6–0 on aggregate.

15 November 2007
20:00

| Morelia | 3–0 | América |
|---|---|---|
| Cervantes 27'; Romero 41'; Landín 72' | Report |

Estadio Morelos, Morelia
Referee: José Gabriel Gómez (Morelos)
18 November 2007
17:00

| América | 1–0 | Morelia |
|---|---|---|
| Esqueda 41' | Report |

Estadio Azteca, Mexico City
Referee: José Abramo Lira (Nuevo León)

Morelia won 3–1 on aggregate.

=== Bracket ===
Quarterfinals
3 | Atlante | 1 | 2 | 3
6 | Cruz Azul | 0 | 1 | 1
4 | Guadalajara | 1 | 1 | 2
5 | San Luis | 1 | 0 | 1
1 | Santos Laguna | 2 | 3 | 5
8 | Morelia | 0 | 2 | 2
2 | Toluca | 0 | 1 | 1
7 | UNAM | 2 | 1 | 3

Semifinals
3 | Atlante (s) | 0 | 1 | 1
4 | Guadalajara | 1 | 0 | 1
1 | Santos Laguna | 0 | 4 | 4
7 | UNAM | 3 | 2 | 5

Finals
3 | Atlante | 0 | 2 | 2
7 | UNAM | 0 | 1 | 1

=== Quarterfinals ===
21 November 2007
19:00

| Cruz Azul | 0–1 | Atlante |
|---|---|---|
| | Report | Pereyra 2' |

Estadio Azul, Mexico City
Referee: Fabián Delgado Horcasitas (Morelos)
24 November 2007
21:00

| Atlante | 2–1 | Cruz Azul |
|---|---|---|
| Maldonado 23'; González 64' | Report | Borgetti 87' |

Estadio Andrés Quintana Roo, Cancún
Referee: Marco Antonio Rodríguez (Mexico City)

Atlante won 3–1 on aggregate.

21 November 2007
21:00

| San Luis | 1–1 | Guadalajara |
|---|---|---|
| Moreno 89' | Report | Santana 38' |

Estadio Alfonso Lastras, San Luis Potosí
Referee: Paul Delgadillo (Jalisco)
24 November 2007
19:00

| Guadalajara | 1–0 | San Luis |
|---|---|---|
| Santana 56' (pen.) | Report |

Estadio Jalisco, Guadalajara
Referee: Armando Archundia (Estado de México)

Guadalajara won 2–1 on aggregate.

22 November 2007
19:00

| Morelia | 0–2 | Santos Laguna |
|---|---|---|
| | Report | Castillo 19'; Ludueña 49' |

Estadio Morelos, Morelia
Referee: Mauricio Morales (Mexico City)
25 November 2007
16:00

| Santos Laguna | 3–2 | Morelia |
|---|---|---|
| Ludueña 45'; García 52'; Vuoso 79' | Report | Guzmán 65'; Arce 81' |

Estadio Corona, Torreón
Referee: Germán Arredondo Ramírez (Guanajuato)

Santos Laguna won 5–2 on aggregate.

22 November 2007
21:00

| UNAM | 2–0 | Toluca |
|---|---|---|
| Scocco 17', 54' (pen.) | Report |

Estadio Olímpico Universitario, Mexico City
Referee: Francisco Chacón (Michoacán)
25 November 2007
12:00

| Toluca | 1–1 | UNAM |
|---|---|---|
| Giménez 33' | Report | Solari 63' |

Estadio Nemesio Díez, Toluca
Referee: Roberto García Orozco (Mexico City)

UNAM won 3–1 on aggregate.

=== Semifinals ===
28 November 2007
21:00

| Guadalajara | 1–0 | Atlante |
|---|---|---|
| Morales 56' (pen.) | Report |

Estadio Jalisco, Guadalajara
Referee: Germán Arredondo Ramírez (Guanajuato)
1 December 2007
21:00

| Atlante | 1–0 | Guadalajara |
|---|---|---|
| Maldonado 3' | Report |

Estadio Andrés Quintana Roo, Cancún
Referee: Armando Archundia (Estado de México)

1–1 on aggregate. Atlante advanced for being the higher seeded team.

29 November 2007
21:00

| UNAM | 3–0 | Santos Laguna |
|---|---|---|
| Scocco 26', 54'; Moreno 50' | Report |

Estadio Olímpico Universitario, Mexico City
Referee: Mauricio Morales (Mexico City)
2 December 2007
17:00

| Santos Laguna | 4–2 | UNAM |
|---|---|---|
| Ludueña 13', 36', 88'; Vuoso 75' | Report | González 11'; Scocco 53' |

Estadio Corona, Torreón
Referee: Roberto García Orozco (Mexico City)

UNAM won 5–4 on aggregate.

=== Finals ===
6 December 2007
21:00

| UNAM | 0–0 | Atlante |
|---|---|---|
| | Report |

Estadio Olímpico Universitario, Mexico City
Referee: Mauricio Morales (Mexico City)
9 December 2007
18:00

| Atlante | 2–1 | UNAM |
|---|---|---|
| Maldonado 59'; Ovalle 86' | Report | Íñiguez 69' |

Estadio Andrés Quintana Roo, Cancún
Referee: Armando Archundia (Estado de México)

Atlante won 2–1 on aggregate.

Champions

3rd title

Notes

By winning Apertura 2007, Atlante earned a quarterfinal spot in the 2008 CONCACAF Champions' Cup, along with a berth in the 2008–09 CONCACAF Champions League Group Stage.

By being the Apertura 2007 runner-up, the Pumas earned a berth in the 2008–09 CONCACAF Champions League Preliminary Round.
