= Jaime Droguett =

Chilean footballer (born 1988)

Personal information
- Full name: Jaime Joel Droguett Diocares
- Date of birth: 28 August 1988 (age 38)
- Place of birth: Santiago, Chile
- Height: 1.77 m (5 ft 10 in)
- Position: Forward

Team information
- Current team: General Velásquez
- Number: 18

Youth career
- Universidad de Chile

Senior career*
Years	Team	Apps	(Gls)
2007–2008	Tecos A	9	(0)
2009	Provincial Osorno	15	(1)
2010	Iberia	–	(–)
2011–2012	Unión Temuco	26	(1)
2013	Trasandino	10	(2)
2013–2014	San Antonio Unido	19	(1)
2014–2016	Unión San Felipe	76	(5)
2016	→ Coquimbo Unido (loan)	10	(0)
2018	Deportes Puerto Montt	20	(0)
2022	Unión Miraflores	–	(–)
2023–2024	Deportes Rengo	40	(3)
2025–	General Velásquez	3	(0)
- * Club domestic league appearances and goals as of 11 April 2023

Jaime Joel Droguett Diocares (born 28 August 1988) is a Chilean football forward who plays for General Velásquez in the Segunda División Profesional de Chile.

== Career ==
A forward from Universidad de Chile youth system, Droguett moved to Mexican side Tecos A at the end of 2007, when his brother, Hugo, was a player of Tecos.

Next, he played for several clubs in his homeland such as Provincial Osorno, Iberia, Unión Temuco, Unión San Felipe, Coquimbo Unido (loan), among others.

After seasons with amateur clubs, in 2023 he joined Deportes Rengo in the Segunda División Profesional de Chile.

== Personal life ==
He is the younger brother of the former Chile international footballer Hugo Droguett.

He started a football academy called Escuela de Fútbol J.J.D.D..
