= Jorge Iván Estrada =

Mexican footballer (born 1983)

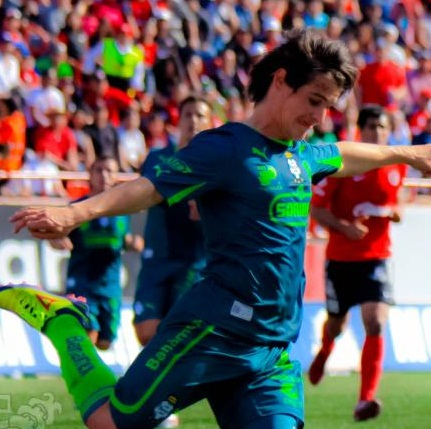
- Estrada playing for Santos Laguna

Personal information
- Full name: Jorge Iván Estrada Manjarrez
- Date of birth: 16 October 1983 (age 43)
- Place of birth: Culiacán, Sinaloa, Mexico
- Height: 1.67 m (5 ft 6 in)
- Position: Full-back

Senior career*
Years	Team	Apps	(Gls)
2004–2006	Sinaloa	73	(1)
2006	Veracruz	6	(0)
2007–2013	Santos Laguna	284	(11)
2013	Pachuca	18	(0)
2014–2018	Tigres UANL	69	(0)
Total			(12)

International career
2010	Mexico	1	(0)
- * Club domestic league appearances and goals

Jorge Iván Estrada Manjarrez (Note: In this Spanish name, the first or paternal surname is Estrada and the second or maternal family name is Manjarrez.) (born 16 October 1983) is a Mexican former professional footballer.

A full-back, his key attributes are his speed and dribbling skills, which makes up for his short height.

== Club career ==
Estrada made his debut on 20 October 2004 against Pachuca, a game which resulted in a 1–0 loss for, his then-team, Dorados de Sinaloa.

== International career ==
He received his first cap in a friendly match against Venezuela on 12 October 2010. His first call to the Mexico national team came in the midst of a conflict between players and now former National Team Director, Nestor de la Torre, and on top of that Estrada suffered an injury that allowed him to play only the first 24 minutes, he was injured by Venezuelan defender Gabriel Cichero.

=== International appearances ===
As of 12 October 2010

International appearances
#	Date	Venue	Opponent	Result	Competition
1.	12 October 2010	Estadio Olímpico Benito Juárez, Ciudad Juárez, Mexico	Venezuela	2–2	Friendly

== Honours ==
Santos Laguna

- Primera División de México: Clausura 2008, Clausura 2012

Tigres UANL

- Liga MX: Apertura 2015, Apertura 2016, Apertura 2017
- Copa MX: Clausura 2014
- Campeón de Campeones: 2016, 2017

Individual

- Primera División de México Best Full-back: Apertura 2007, Bicentenario 2010, Apertura 2010, Clausura 2012
- Tecate Premios Deportes Best XI: 2008
