= Sergio Ávila =

Mexican footballer (born 1985)

Personal information
- Full name: Sergio Gabriel Ávila Valle
- Date of birth: 2 September 1985 (age 41)
- Place of birth: Irapuato, Guanajuato, Mexico
- Height: 1.68 m (5 ft 6 in)
- Positions: Attacking midfielder; winger

Youth career
- 1995–2005: Guadalajara

Senior career*
Years	Team	Apps	(Gls)
2004–2011	Guadalajara	61	(11)
2011	→ Querétaro (loan)	4	(0)
2011	→ La Piedad (loan)	0	(0)

International career
2008	Mexico U23	8	(1)
- * Club domestic league appearances and goals as of 26 May 2015

Sergio Gabriel Ávila Valle, also known as El Gaucho, (born on 2 September 1985) is a Mexican former professional footballer.

== Club career ==
=== C.D. Guadalajara ===
He debuted on April 1, 2005, in the Chivas' loss against CF UAG 3–2, but was praised by the then coach Benjamín Galindo. After the loss of 6 players before the FIFA World Cup 2006, Chivas played with a lot of young players, some of them with absolutely no experience in First Division and they managed to reach the semifinals, losing to C.F. Pachuca with a last minute goal.

"El Gauchito" capped his first goal in the Liguilla (Playoffs) of the Clausura 2006 against Chiapas FC. In Apertura 2006, he only played 86 minutes in 3 games. He often played for CD Guadalajara's Lower Division club team CD Tapatío. While Efrain Flores was coach he started every game and contributed to his team's efforts with seven goals.

Sergio Avila's last season with Chivas was the Apertura 2010 season.

=== Querétaro ===
In January 2011, it was announced that Ávila, along with Juan Antonio Ocampo, was traded to Querétaro F.C. Avila only played 3 games with Querétaro during the Clausura 2011 season and was traded again to La Piedad.

=== La Piedad ===
In June 2011, it was announced that Ávila was traded to CF La Piedad. Avila never played a single match and soon retired from professional football.

=== Forced retirement ===
Ávila always had leg problems throughout his career, and after many surgeries he was forced to retire at the young age of 25 due to insufficient healing.

=== International Tournaments with Chivas de Guadalajara ===
- 2007 North American SuperLiga
- 2007 Copa Sudamericana
- 2008 North American SuperLiga
- 2008 Copa Sudamericana
- 2008 Copa Libertadores
- 2009 Copa Libertadores

=== International appearances ===
Sub-23 International appearances in 2008

International appearances
#	Date	Venue	Opponent	Result	Competition
1.	February 19, 2008	Estadio Nemesio Díez, Toluca, Mexico	Chile	2–0	Friendly
2.	February 22, 2008	Estadio Corregidora, Querétaro, Mexico	Ecuador	0–1	Friendly
3.	February 27, 2008	Estadio Caliente, Tijuana, Mexico	Paraguay	0–0	Friendly
4.	March 2, 2008	McAfee Coliseum, Oakland, California, United States	Australia	1–1	Friendly
5.	March 6, 2008	Pizza Hut Park, Frisco, Texas, United States	Finland	0–0	Friendly
6.	March 12, 2008	Home Depot Center, Carson, California, United States	Canada	1–1	2008 CONCACAF Olympic Qualifiers
7.	March 14, 2008	Home Depot Center, Carson, California, United States	Guatemala	1–2	2008 CONCACAF Olympic Qualifiers
8.	March 16, 2008	Home Depot Center, Carson, California, United States	Haiti	5–1	2008 CONCACAF Olympic Qualifiers

=== International goals ===
Goal	Date	Venue	Opponent	Score	Result	Competition
1.	February 19, 2008	Estadio Nemesio Díez, Toluca, Mexico	Chile	2–0	2–0	Friendly

== Honours ==
Guadalajara

- Mexican Primera División: Apertura 2006
