= Jaime Toledo =

Mexican footballer (born 1989)

Personal information
- Full name: Jaime Toledo Olivo
- Date of birth: 23 April 1989 (age 37)
- Place of birth: Escuinapa, Sinaloa, Mexico
- Height: 1.75 m (5 ft 9 in)
- Position: Midfielder

Team information
- Current team: Madera Santos
- Number: 8

Senior career*
Years	Team	Apps	(Gls)
2008–2015	Santos Laguna	22	(1)
2012–2013	→ Veracruz (loan)	27	(0)
2013–2015	Atlético San Luis	12	(0)
2016	Tampico Madero	4	(0)
2016	FC Juárez	28	(0)
- * Club domestic league appearances and goals as of 31 October 2017

Jaime Toledo Olivo (born 23 April 1989) is a Mexican professional footballer who plays as a midfielder for Madera Santos, in the Madera Premier League.

Toledo began his playing career in the Santos Laguna youth teams in 2007. He managed to break into the first team on October 12, 2008, during a 2–0 loss to CF Pachuca.

He has also played in the CONCACAF Champions League for Santos, playing in 4 games.
