= Santiago Hoyos =

Argentine football defender

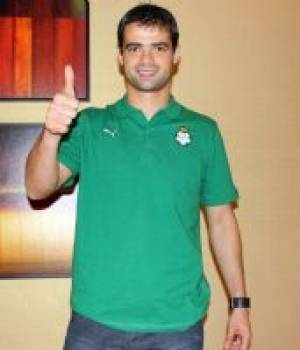

Personal information
- Full name: Santiago Abel Hoyos
- Date of birth: 3 June 1982 (age 44)
- Place of birth: Buenos Aires, Argentina
- Height: 1.83 m (6 ft 0 in)
- Position: Centre back

Senior career*
Years	Team	Apps	(Gls)
2000–2011	Lanús	230	(8)
2004–2005	→ San Lorenzo (loan)	6	(0)
2011–2013	Santos Laguna	29	(1)
2013–2014	San Martín (SJ)	31	(0)
2014–2015	All Boys	19	(0)
- * Club domestic league appearances and goals

Santiago "El Facha" Abel Hoyos (born 3 June 1982) is an Argentine retired football defender.

== Career ==
Hoyos made his professional debut in 2000 for Lanús, he played for the club until 2004 when he joined San Lorenzo de Almagro. Hoyos did not fit into the San Lorenzo set-up, making only 6 appearances in the 2004–2005 season.

In 2005 Hoyos returned to Lanús, and in 2007 he was part of the squad that won the Apertura 2007 tournament, Lanús' first top flight league title.

In June 2011, Hoyos joined Mexican club Santos Laguna.

In January 2013, return to Argentina signed for San Martín (SJ).

== Titles ==
Season	Team	Title
Apertura 2007	Club Atlético Lanús	Primera División Argentina
Clausura 2012	Santos Laguna	Mexican Primera División
