= Miguel Becerra =

Mexican footballer (born 1979)

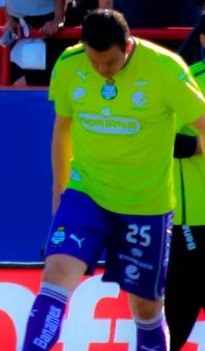

Personal information
- Full name: Miguel Becerra Gonzalez
- Date of birth: 11 March 1979 (age 47)
- Place of birth: Etzatlán, Jalisco, Mexico
- Height: 1.85 m (6 ft 1 in)
- Position: Goalkeeper

Senior career*
Years	Team	Apps	(Gls)
2001–2002	Guadalajara	2	(0)
2003–2004	Dorados	7	(0)
2005–2007	Querétaro	66	(0)
2007–2012	Santos Laguna	30	(0)
- * Club domestic league appearances and goals

Miguel Becerra González (born 11 March 1979) is a Mexican former football goalkeeper who last played for Santos Laguna.

== Playing career ==
Miguel Becerra debuted with Chivas de Guadalajara taking over the absence of Oswaldo Sánchez who went with the World cup Squad who played in Korea/Japan 2002. He was transfer to Dorados de Sinaloa and played seven games there until leaving for Querétaro F.C. in which he was the starting goalkeeper for a period of time. He left Querétaro when the team was relegated back to Primera Division A, and transferred to Santos Laguna and was reunited with an old goalkeeping friend Oswaldo Sánchez. When things seemed like if Becerra would not play with Santos, Oswaldo was injured and Miguel played the rest of the tournament and played well, and gained the nickname of "El Gordo" from many commentators. With Becerra Santos reached the Semifinals only to lose to Pumas UNAM by a small margin aggregate 5–4.

=== Honors ===
==== Santos Laguna ====
- Primera División (1): Clausura 2012
