= Juan Pablo Rodríguez =

Mexican footballer (born 1979)

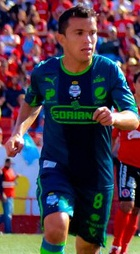
- Rodríguez with Santos Laguna in 2012

Personal information
- Full name: Juan Pablo Rodríguez Guerrero
- Date of birth: 7 August 1979 (age 47)
- Place of birth: Zapopan, Jalisco, Mexico
- Height: 1.66 m (5 ft 5 in)
- Position: Midfielder

Team information
- Current team: Colo-Colo (assistant)

Senior career*
Years	Team	Apps	(Gls)
1997–2003	Atlas	189	(53)
2003–2006	Tecos UAG	107	(12)
2006	Guadalajara	13	(0)
2007–2018	Santos Laguna	292	(36)
2015	→ Atlas (loan)	15	(1)
2015–2018	→ Morelia (loan)	63	(12)
Total		679	(114)

International career
1999	Mexico U20	5	(2)
2000–2006	Mexico	43	(1)

Managerial career
- 2018–2019: Santos Laguna (assistant)
- 2019: Santos Laguna (academy)
- 2022–2023: América (assistant)
- 2023–2024: Monterrey (assistant)
- 2025: Santos Laguna (assistant)
- 2025–: Colo-Colo (assistant)
Medal record
Representing Mexico
Winner	CONCACAF Gold Cup	2003
Runner-up	Copa America	2001
- * Club domestic league appearances and goals

Juan Pablo Rodríguez Guerrero (born 7 August 1979) is a Mexican former professional footballer who played as a midfielder and current assistant manager for Chilean Primera División club Colo-Colo.

== Playing career ==
Nicknamed "El Chato" or "Comandante", Rodríguez is one of the many football players to have come out of Atlas.

Rodríguez was signed to the San Jose Earthquakes in the 1998 season; he didn't appear in any games opting to stay in Mexico.

Rodríguez became captain of Atlas F.C. at the age of 21. His mature performances in central midfield during the 1999 Copa Libertadores provoked much interest on the part of the League's big teams. After playing and growing as a player in Atlas for six years, he joined Tecos.

In Tecos UAG, Rodríguez's high point came in 2005, when he and Daniel Luduena led the team to the final, only to lose against Club América.

In 2006, he joined Guadalajara for the Apertura 2006 in the Mexican league, and then to Santos Laguna at Clausura 2007.

At Chivas de Guadalajara, his performance was criticized by the media, which believed Rodríguez could only perform well without pressure, with bad reviews following him during the first part of the season, with his new team struggling to remain in Primera División. However, in 2007 Clausura he displayed good enough football to earn a starting place.

At the start of the Apertura 2007, in the second game, Rodríguez scored against Toluca, eventually beating them 3–2. He also scored in the match against Club Puebla

An international since 2003, Rodríguez has 36 caps for Mexico, with 2 goals. He was part of 2003 CONCACAF Gold Cup where Mexico won. He was also present in the 2005 FIFA Confederations Cup, with the national side finishing fourth, losing on extra time against Germany. In December 2014 he returned to his first team, Atlas F.C.

== International goals ==
No.	Date	Venue	Opponent	Score	Result	Competition	Ref.
1.	July 20, 2003	Estadio Azteca, Mexico City, Mexico	Jamaica	5–0	5–0	2003 CONCACAF Gold Cup	

== Coaching career ==
As an assistant coach of Fernando Ortiz, Rodríguez moved to Chilean club Colo-Colo in August 2025.

== Honours ==
Guadalajara

- Mexican Primera División: Apertura 2006

Santos Laguna

- Mexican Primera División: Clausura 2008, Clausura 2012
- Copa MX: Apertura 2014

Mexico

- Copa América runner-up: 2001

Individual

- Mexican Primera División Best Midfielder: Invierno 1999
- Mexican Primera División Best Defensive Midfielder: Apertura 2011, Clausura 2012

Records

- Santos Laguna Most appearances: 343
