= Rodolfo Salinas =

Mexican footballer (born 1987)

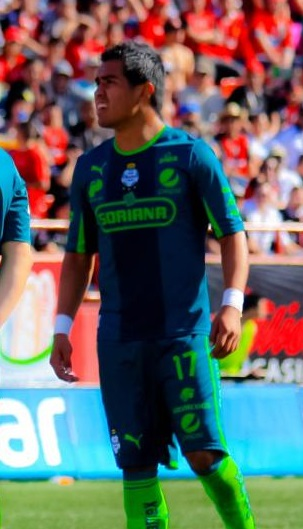
- Salinas playing for Santos Laguna

Personal information
- Full name: Rodolfo Salinas Ortiz
- Date of birth: 29 August 1987 (age 39)
- Place of birth: Gómez Palacio, Durango, Mexico
- Height: 1.74 m (5 ft 9 in)
- Position: Midfielder

Senior career*
Years	Team	Apps	(Gls)
2007–2010	San Luis	73	(3)
2010–2015	Santos Laguna	146	(7)
2015–2017	→ Atlas (loan)	23	(1)
2017–2018	Celaya	46	(6)
2019	Zacatepec	16	(0)
2019	Puebla	5	(0)
2020	Los Cabos	0	(0)
2021–2022	UAT	39	(4)

International career
2007	Mexico U23	2	(0)
- * Club domestic league appearances and goals as of 12 April 2022

Rodolfo Salinas Ortiz (born 29 August 1987) is a Mexican professional footballer who plays as a midfielder.

== Club career ==
He made his debut on January 21, 2007, against Club América in which San Luis lost 4–1. His number at the time was #98. He played 7 league games in the entire Clausura season. In the apertura season of 2007 he played 5 games and scored no goals. He scored his first goal against CF Monterrey on March 15, 2008, in which San Luis won 3–1. For the 2008–2009 season he has a starting position. He scored his second goal against Puebla in which the game ended 1-1.

He played with Los Cabos of the Liga de Balompié Mexicano during the league's inaugural season in 2020–21.

== Honours ==
Santos Laguna

- Liga MX: Clausura 2012, Clausura 2015
- Copa MX: Apertura 2014
