= José María Cárdenas =

Mexican footballer (born 1985)

José Maria Cárdenas
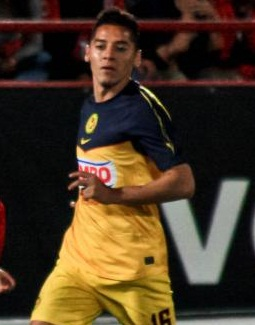
- Cárdenas playing for América in 2012

Personal information
- Full name: José Maria Cárdenas López
- Date of birth: 2 April 1985 (age 41)
- Place of birth: Zacatecas, Mexico
- Height: 1.74 m (5 ft 9 in)
- Position: Left-back

Senior career*
Years	Team	Apps	(Gls)
2005–2008	Atlante	70	(5)
2008–2009	Pachuca	39	(5)
2009–2012	Santos Laguna	79	(2)
2012–2014	América	37	(0)
2013	→ Morelia (loan)	35	(2)
2014	→ León (loan)	18	(1)
2014–2015	León	31	(2)
2015–2016	Tijuana	22	(0)
2016–2017	Dorados	17	(3)
Total		348	(20)

International career
2009–2013	Mexico	4	(1)
Medal record
Representing Mexico
CONCACAF Gold Cup
Winner	CONCACAF Gold Cup	2009
- * Club domestic league appearances and goals

José Maria Cárdenas López (Note: In this Spanish name, the first or paternal surname is Cárdenas and the second or maternal family name is López.) (born 2 April 1985) is a Mexican former professional footballer who played as a left-back.

Cárdenas received his first call-up to the Mexico national team in a friendly against Bolivia, scoring his first goal as well in a 5–1 victory. He was also called up to play the 2009 CONCACAF Gold Cup tournament with Mexico.

== Club career ==
=== Atlante ===
He made his Primera División debut with Atlante on 24 August 2005 in a 2–2 draw against San Luis during the 2005 Apertura tournament. During that season, he only amassed 9 league matches, scoring no goals. During the 2006 Clausura, José María played in all 17 league matches, helping Atlante reach the play-offs. Although part of the team, Cárdenas was not able to play a part in Atlante's 2007 Apertura championship campaign, winning in the final against UNAM. His last season with the Cancún-based club was the 2008 Clausura, playing only one match. In total, Cárdenas played 70 matches for Atlante, and scored 5 goals.

== International career ==
He made his debut with the senior national team on 11 March 2009 in a friendly against Bolivia and scored in his debut.

=== International goals ===
No.	Date	Venue	Opponent	Score	Result	Competition	Ref.
1.	11 March 2009	Commerce City, Colorado, United States	Bolivia	5–1	Win	Friendly	

=== International appearances ===
As of 20 July 2013

International appearances
#	Date	Venue	Opponent	Result	Competition
1.	11 March 2009	Commerce City, Colorado, United States	Bolivia	5–1	Friendly
2.	28 June 2009	Qualcomm Stadium, San Diego, United States	Guatemala	0–0	Friendly
3.	9 February 2011	Georgia Dome, Atlanta, United States	Bosnia and Herzegovina	2–0	Friendly
4.	20 July 2013	Georgia Dome, Atlanta, United States	Trinidad and Tobago	1–0	2013 CONCACAF Gold Cup

== Honours ==
América

- Liga MX: Clausura 2013

Morelia

- Copa MX: Apertura 2013

León

- Liga MX: Clausura 2014

Mexico

- CONCACAF Gold Cup: 2009
