= Osmar Mares =

Mexican footballer (born 1987)

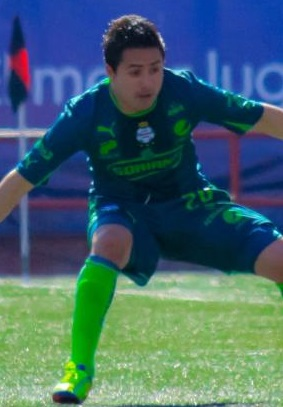
- Mares with Santos Laguna in 2012

Personal information
- Full name: Osmar Mares Martínez
- Date of birth: 17 June 1987 (age 39)
- Place of birth: Torreón, Mexico
- Height: 1.70 m (5 ft 7 in)
- Position: Left-back

Senior career*
Years	Team	Apps	(Gls)
2006–2015	Santos Laguna	125	(0)
2010–2011	→ San Luis (loan)	26	(2)
2014–2015	→ América (loan)	23	(0)
2015–2019	América	47	(0)
2017–2019	→ Veracruz (loan)	35	(1)
2018–2019	→ Necaxa (loan)	4	(0)

International career
2007	Mexico U20	2	(1)
- * Club domestic league appearances and goals

Osmar Mares Martínez (born 17 June 1987) is a Mexican former professional footballer who played as a left-back. Mares has been capped for the Mexico national team at the U-20 level, and played in the 2007 FIFA U-20 World Cup in Canada.

== Career ==
He played for most of his career in Santos Laguna, starting from 2006, and ending in 2015, when Club América purchased him after a year loan. Other than Santos and America, he also had a stint with San Luis in 2010. In February 2015, Mares scored his first goal for America in a Concacaf Champions League quarter final match against Saprissa, in which America won 2–0.

== Honours ==
Santos Laguna

- Mexican Primera División: Clausura 2012

América

- Liga MX: Apertura 2014
- CONCACAF Champions League: 2014–15, 2015–16
