= Aarón Galindo =

Mexican footballer (born 1982)

Personal information
- Full name: Aarón Galindo Rubio
- Date of birth: 8 May 1982 (age 44)
- Place of birth: Mexico City, Mexico
- Height: 1.83 m (6 ft 0 in)
- Position: Centre-back

Senior career*
Years	Team	Apps	(Gls)
2002–2006	Cruz Azul	102	(7)
2006	Hércules	7	(0)
2007	Grasshoppers	15	(2)
2007–2008	Eintracht Frankfurt	32	(0)
2009–2010	Guadalajara	39	(3)
2011–2014	Santos Laguna	43	(2)
2013–2014	→ Toluca (loan)	16	(0)
2014–2017	Toluca	76	(0)
2017–2018	Toledo	17	(1)
Total		347	(15)

International career
1999	Mexico U17	4	(1)
2004	Mexico U23	3	(0)
2004–2009	Mexico	20	(0)
Medal record
Representing Mexico
Men's Football
Central American and Caribbean Games
Silver medal – second place	2002 San Salvador	Team competition
- * Club domestic league appearances and goals

Aarón Galindo Rubio (born 8 May 1982) is a Mexican former professional footballer who played as a centre-back.

== Biography ==
Born in Mexico City, Mexico, Galindo began practicing with Cruz Azul at the young age of six, climbing up the youth ranks. Finally Galindo made his debut with the first team in the 2002 spring season, and was a solid starter by the 2003 Clausura season. Galindo was a member of the senior national team, and has played for numerous Mexico youth teams; a starter for the U-23 team at the 2004 Summer Olympics.

Two games into the 2005 FIFA Confederations Cup, Galindo along with teammate (of both club and country) Salvador Carmona were separated from the rest of the national team staying in Göttingen, Germany. Initially disciplinary problems was the explanation given by the Mexico federation for the separation, the federation later confirmed both players tested positive for performance enhancement drugs. Both men received a one-year ban from competition, which barred Galindo from playing in the 2005 Apertura, 2006 Clausura seasons, and the 2006 FIFA World Cup.

=== Hércules CF ===
Galindo signed in the summer of 2006 with Hércules CF of the Spanish second division. Despite being considered a major signing by the club he played very few games and was on the bench for most of the season.

=== Grasshopper Club Zürich ===
Galindo signed a contract with Swiss team Grasshopper Club Zürich in February 2007. Galindo capped his first goal with Grasshopper Club Zürich and in the Swiss Super League on 17 February 2007 against FC Thun. He scored the first goal in the match for Grasshoppers in the 49th minute. The goal came after teammate Diego León's pass to Sreto Ristić, who in turn gave a through pass to Galindo. Taking advantage of the opportunity, Galindo's shot ended up in Thun's nets. His first goal contributed to Grasshoppers' 2–0 win over Thun.

=== Eintracht Frankfurt ===
On 28 July 2007, it was announced that Galindo had signed a two-year contract at the German club Eintracht Frankfurt.

=== Guadalajara ===
On 8 January 2009, Galindo left Frankfurt to return to his native Mexico to play for Club Deportivo Guadalajara to sign a four-year contract. On 28 February 2009, Galindo scored his first goal with Chivas de Guadalajara in a 5–0 win over C.F. Pachuca in the Jalisco Stadium.

=== Santos Laguna ===
On 7 June 2011, Galindo signed with Santos Laguna.

=== Toluca ===
After seeing less action on the pitch with Santos Laguna he was loaned to Toluca on 8 July 2013, where he competes for the starting line up with Paulo Da Silva, Edgar Dueñas and Francisco Gamboa.

=== Toledo ===
On 1 September 2017, Galindo returned to Spain after agreeing to a contract with CD Toledo.

== Honours ==
Santos Laguna

- Mexican Primera División: Clausura 2012

Guadalajara

- InterLiga: 2009

Mexico U23

- CONCACAF Olympic Qualifying Championship: 2004

Individual

- CONCACAF Men's Olympic Qualifying Championship Best XI: 2004
