= Hugo Droguett =

Chilean footballer (born 1982)

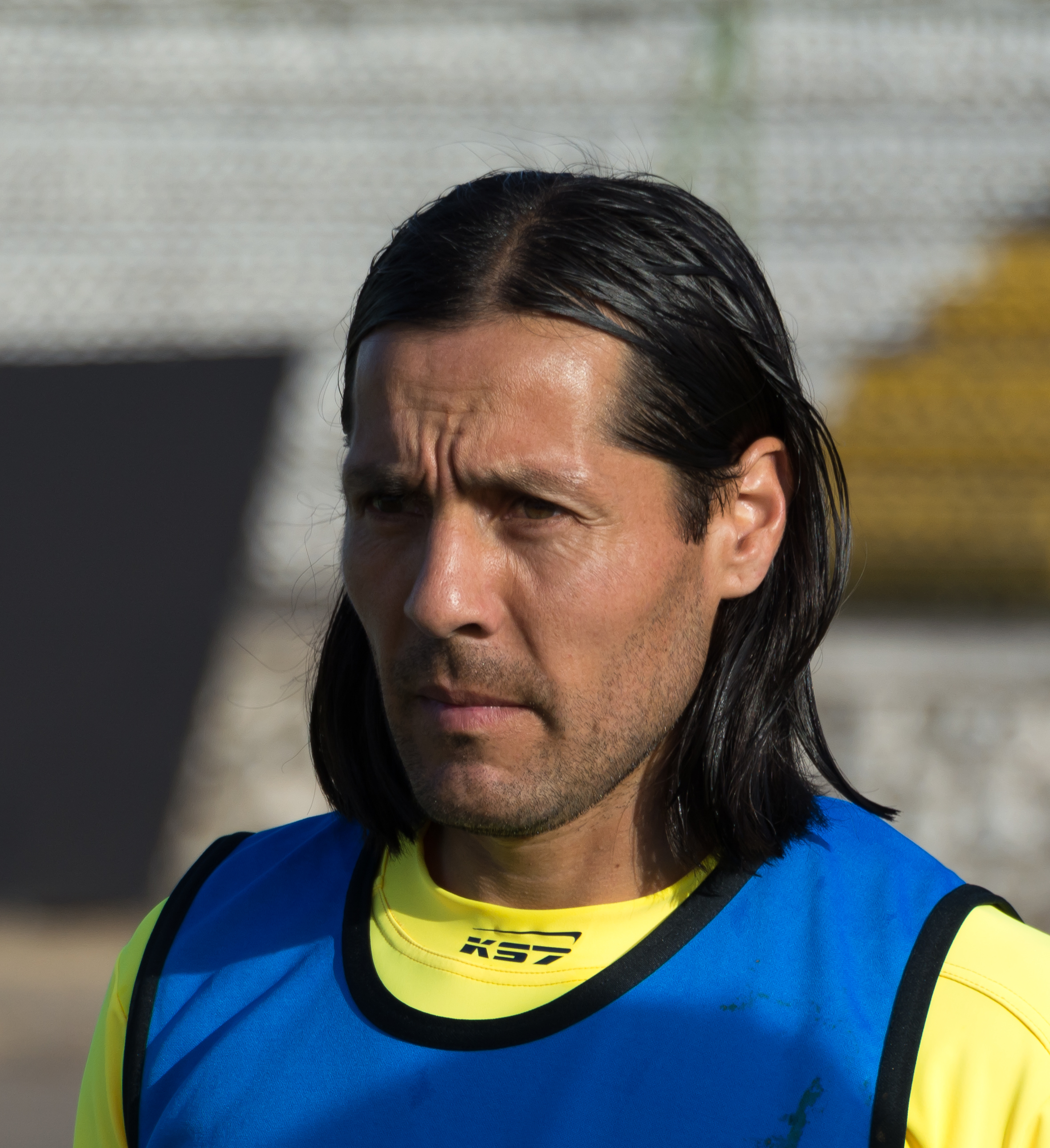

Personal information
- Full name: Hugo Patricio Droguett Diocares
- Date of birth: 2 September 1982 (age 44)
- Place of birth: Santiago, Chile
- Height: 1.70 m (5 ft 7 in)
- Positions: Midfielder; winger

Youth career
- Universidad Católica

Senior career*
Years	Team	Apps	(Gls)
2001	Universidad Católica	1	(0)
2002–2003	Deportes Temuco	52	(9)
2004–2005	Universidad de Concepción	33	(8)
2005–2006	Universidad de Chile	36	(10)
2006–2008	UAG Tecos	65	(24)
2008–2010	Morelia	87	(16)
2011–2012	Cruz Azul	24	(2)
2012	→ Jeonbuk Hyundai (loan)	37	(10)
2013	Deportivo Cali	16	(1)
2013	Cobreloa	13	(3)
2014	Jeju United	36	(10)
2015	O'Higgins	22	(1)
2016–2017	Deportes Antofagasta	40	(6)
2017–2019	Universidad de Concepción	54	(15)
2019–2021	Deportes Temuco	65	(9)
Total		581	(124)

International career
1999	Chile U17		
2001	Chile U20		
2006–2008	Chile	13	(1)
- * Club domestic league appearances and goals

Hugo Patricio Droguett Diocares (born 2 September 1982) is a Chilean former football midfielder. He has also represented Chile internationally.

== Club career ==
Born in Santiago, Chile, Droguett started his career playing for Universidad Católica. A year later he signed for Deportes Temuco. In 2004, he joined Universidad de Concepción, before join Universidad de Chile in 2005.

After he played for Universidad de Chile, he signed with UAG Tecos from 2006 to 2008. Later, he played for Monarcas Morelia between 2008 and 2010.

He signed for Cruz Azul on 26 November 2010 to play for the club starting in the Clausura 2011 in the Primera División de México. Cruz Azul paid him $3 million that season.

On 24 February 2012, Droguett joined South Korean powerhouse Jeonbuk Hyundai Motors on a season-long loan deal.

In 2013, he played for Deportivo Cali of Colombia, and later in Chile for Cobreloa. In 2014 he came back to South Korea, and began playing for Jeju United, where he played 36 matches and scored 10 goals.

On 23 December 2014, he returned to Chile, joining Santiago club O'Higgins for the 2014–15 season.

In March 2022, Droguett announced his retirement from football after having played for Deportes Temuco in 2021.

== International career ==
Droguett represented Chile at under-17 level in the 1999 South American Championship and at under-20 level in the 2001 South American Championship.

On 15 November 2006, Droguett made his debut with the national team in a friendly versus Paraguay. He scored a goal against Austria in a friendly match played in the Ernst Happel Stadion.

#	Date	Venue	Opponent	Score	Result	Competition
1.	7 September 2007	Ernst Happel Stadion, Vienna, Austria	Austria	1–0	2–0	Friendly match

== Personal life ==
His younger brother, Jaime, is also a professional footballer.

== Post-retirement ==
A graduated football manager, Droguett has worked for the football unit of the municipality of Temuco. At the same time, he has played at amateur level for Club Deportivo Dante from Nueva Imperial.

== Career statistics ==
=== Club ===
As of 16 February 2015

Club	Season	League			Copa Chile		Supercopa		Continental		Total	
Club	Season	Division	Apps	Goals	Apps	Goals	Apps	Goals	Apps	Goals	Apps	Goals
O'Higgins	2014–15	Primera División	5	0	0	0	—				5	0
Career total			5	0	0	0	0	0	0	0	5	0
