= Daniel Ludueña =

Argentine footballer (born 1982)

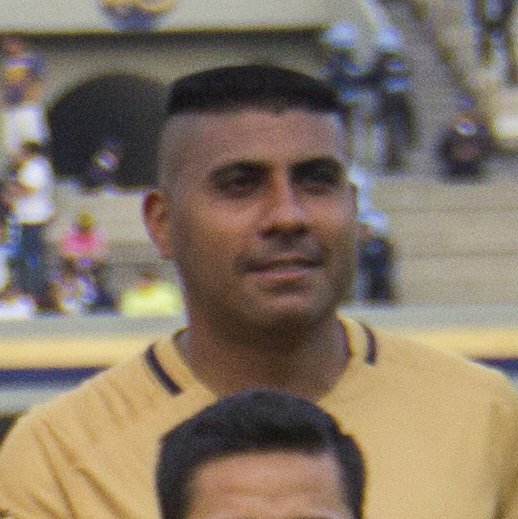
- Ludueña with UNAM in 2016

Personal information
- Full name: Daniel Emmanuel Ludueña
- Date of birth: July 27, 1982 (age 44)
- Place of birth: Córdoba, Argentina
- Height: 1.68 m (5 ft 6 in)
- Position: Attacking midfielder

Senior career*
Years	Team	Apps	(Gls)
1998–2004	River Plate	40	(2)
2005–2006	Tecos UAG	64	(19)
2007–2013	Santos Laguna	215	(63)
2013	Pachuca	32	(2)
2014–2016	Pumas UNAM	68	(9)
2016	→ Talleres (loan)	4	(0)
2017–2018	Tampico Madero	25	(7)
Total		412	(89)
- * Club domestic league appearances and goals

Daniel Emmanuel Ludueña (born 27 July 1982) is an Argentine former professional footballer. Nicknamed El Hachita, he spent most of his career in Mexico.

He is the older brother of footballer Gonzalo Ludueña and the son of former Talleres de Córdoba player Luis Antonio Ludueña. He also holds Mexican citizenship.

== Career ==
On July 27, 2013, Ludueña made a 70-yard goal against Tigres that proved to be the game winner in a 2–1 win.

On 8 July 2016, Talleres de Córdoba reached an agreement with Pumas for a 6-month-loan of Ludueña.

On 16 August 2018, Ludueña retired from professional football.

== Honours ==
=== Club ===
Santos Laguna

- Primera División de México: Clausura 2008, Clausura 2012

=== Individual ===
- Primera División de México Attacking Midfielder of the Tournament: 2004–05, Apertura 2007, Clausura 2008
- Liga MX Balón de Oro: Apertura 2007
