= Danilinho (footballer, born 1987) =

Brazilian footballer

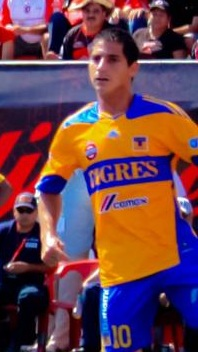
- Danilinho in 2011

Personal information
- Full name: Danilo Veron Bairros
- Date of birth: 11 March 1987 (age 39)
- Place of birth: Ponta Porã, Brazil
- Height: 1.67 m (5 ft 6 in)
- Position: Attacking midfielder

Team information
- Current team: Central

Youth career
- 2000–2003: América-SP
- 2003: Schalke 04

Senior career*
Years	Team	Apps	(Gls)
2005	América-SP	16	(2)
2005	Santos	9	(0)
2006–2008	Atlético Mineiro	111	(29)
2008–2010	Chiapas	84	(17)
2011–2015	UANL	97	(9)
2012	→ Atlético Mineiro (loan)	21	(6)
2014–2015	→ Querétaro (loan)	34	(0)
2015–2017	Querétaro	14	(0)
2016	→ Chiapas (loan)	15	(1)
2016–2017	→ Fluminense (loan)	9	(0)
2017	Vitória	10	(1)
2018–2019	Correcaminos UAT	4	(0)
2019	CRB	5	(0)
2020–	Central	7	(0)

International career
2007	Brazil U20	4	(2)
- * Club domestic league appearances and goals as of 00:49, 1 May 2019 (UTC)

Danilo Veron Bairros (born 11 March 1987), commonly known as Danilinho, is a Brazilian professional footballer who plays for Central Sport Club.

An attacking midfielder, he plays mainly as a winger and central midfielder. He is known for his technical skill, quick acceleration and dribbling. Before joining Tigres, he played for América, Santos FC, Atlético Mineiro and Chiapas.

== Career ==
=== Loan to Chiapas ===
On 16 December 2015, Querétaro announced via Twitter that Danilinho would be joining Chiapas on loan for the next 6 months with an option to sign permanently.

=== Loan to Fluminense ===
On 15 July 2016, Danilinho joined Fluminense on a one-year loan deal.

== Honours ==
=== Club ===
Atlético Mineiro

- Campeonato Brasileiro Série B: 2006
- Campeonato Mineiro: 2007, 2012

UANL

- Primera División de México: Apertura 2011
- Copa MX: Clausura 2014
