= Carlos Ochoa (footballer) =

Mexican footballer (born 1978)

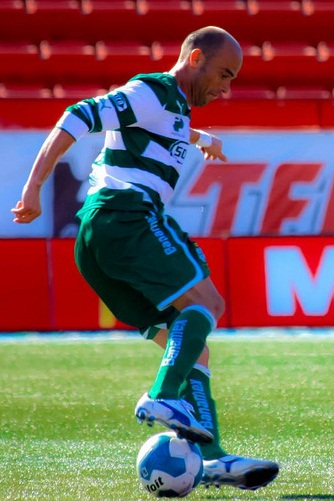
- Ochoa playing for Santos Laguna

Personal information
- Full name: Carlos Augusto Ochoa Mendoza
- Date of birth: 5 March 1978 (age 48)
- Place of birth: Apatzingán, Michoacán, Mexico
- Height: 1.80 m (5 ft 11 in)
- Position: Striker

Senior career*
Years	Team	Apps	(Gls)
1999–2000	Necaxa	1	(0)
2001–2003	Tigres UANL	63	(11)
2002	→ Osasuna (loan)	3	(0)
2003–2004	Querétaro	30	(10)
2004–2006	Chiapas	60	(21)
2006–2008	Monterrey	76	(16)
2009	→ Guadalajara (loan)	9	(2)
2009–2015	Santos Laguna	42	(7)
2010	→ Chiapas (loan)	15	(7)
2011	→ Tigres UANL (loan)	8	(1)
2012–2013	→ Morelia (loan)	23	(6)
2013–2014	→ Chiapas (loan)	31	(12)
2014	→ Veracruz (loan)	13	(1)
2015	→ Atlas (loan)	8	(0)
2015	→ Morelia (loan)	4	(1)
Total		386	(95)

International career
2002–2009	Mexico	10	(1)
- * Club domestic league appearances and goals

Carlos Augusto Ochoa Mendoza (Note: In this Spanish name, the first or paternal surname is Ochoa and the second or maternal family name is Mendoza.) (born 5 March 1978) is a Mexican former professional footballer who played as a striker.

== Career ==
He started his career as a substitute for Necaxa in 1999, and was part of their squad that finished third in the 2000 FIFA Club World Championship. He later rose to prominence playing with Tigres UANL, where he reached the final. From Tigres, he was transferred to CA Osasuna of Pamplona in La Liga, but saw little action and was returned to Tigres. He has also played with Querétaro and Chiapas, where Salvador Cabañas and he formed a dominant forward offense in the 2000s. He then moved to Monterrey where he played for two years.

In December 2008, Ochoa was loaned to Club Deportivo Guadalajara on a one-year deal with an option for sale.

Ochoa stated that he would be honored to end his career with the Guadalajara jersey. He also said he had wanted for years to play for Chivas, but since they never made an offer, he stayed with Monterrey. During the Interliga 2009, Ochoa scored four goals in three games for Chivas. In the final he scored an own goal but Chivas still won the Interliga Championship.

In his Clausura 2009 debut, he scored 2 goals against Cruz Azul, which ended in a 3–3 draw. Due to poor performance, though, Ochoa was sent to CD Tapatio, the Chivas second-division affiliate. When new head coach Paco Ramirez took rein of Chivas, Ochoa was called back up to the first team.

At the end of the season, Chivas passed on purchasing Ochoa and he was sold by Monterrey to Santos Laguna for the Apertura 2009 season. After being purchased by Santos Laguna, he has been also loaned to Chiapas and Tigres UANL. After his loan to Tigres UANL he returned to Santos Laguna.

== International career ==
During Javier Aguirre's era in front of Mexico, he was called up for the 2002 World Cup qualifying matches, but in the end he was left out of the squad that participated in the 2002 World Cup. Five years later, he finally got another chance to represent his national team again.

== Career statistics ==
=== International ===
As of match played 11 February 2009

National team	Year	Apps	Goals
Mexico	2002	5	1
Mexico	2008	3	0
Mexico	2009	2	0
Total		10	1

=== International goals ===
Goal	Date	Venue	Opponent	Score	Result	Competition
1.	January 21, 2002	Rose Bowl, Pasadena, United States	Guatemala	3–1	3–1	2002 CONCACAF Gold Cup
