= 2014–15 Monarcas Morelia season =

Morelia
2014–15 season
- Chairman: Roberto Hernández
- Manager: Enrique Meza
- Stadium: Estadio Morelos

The 2014–15 Morelia season is the 68th professional season of Mexico's top-flight football league. The season is split into two tournaments—the Torneo Apertura and the Torneo Clausura—each with identical formats and each contested by the same eighteen teams. Morelia began their season on July 20, 2014 against Toluca, Morelia played most of their homes games on Fridays at 9:30 local time.

== Torneo Apertura ==
=== Squad ===
Note: Flags indicate national team as defined under FIFA eligibility rules; some limited exceptions apply. Players may hold more than one non-FIFA nationality.

No.	Pos.	Nation	Player
1	GK	MEX	Carlos Felipe Rodríguez
2	DF	MEX	Ignacio González
3	DF	MEX	José Antonio Olvera
4	DF	MEX	Luis Fernando Silva
5	DF	MEX	Carlos Guzmán
6	DF	MEX	Joel Huiqui
7	DF	PAN	Felipe Baloy
8	MF	URU	Hamilton Pereira (on loan from River Plate)
10	FW	SVK	David Depetris (on loan from Çaykur Rizespor)
11	MF	MEX	Luis Ángel Morales
12	GK	MEX	Carlos López (on loan from América)
13	MF	MEX	Jorge Zárate
15	MF	URU	Martín Alaníz

No.	Pos.	Nation	Player
16	GK	MEX	Alexandro Álvarez
17	MF	MEX	Hibert Ruiz
19	DF	PAR	Luis Cardozo (on loan from Cerro Porteño)
20	FW	COL	Duvier Riascos
22	MF	MEX	Armando Zamorano
23	MF	MEX	Juan de Dios Ixtlahuac
24	DF	MEX	Rodrigo Godínez
26	MF	MEX	Christian Valdéz
27	MF	MEX	Miguel Sansores
28	DF	MEX	Carlos Adrián Morales (captain)
29	DF	MEX	Santiago Altamira
30	FW	MEX	Víctor Guajardo
31	FW	MEX	Óscar Fernández

=== Regular season ===
Win Draw Loss

==== Apertura 2014 results ====
July 20, 2014 Round 1	Toluca	0–0	Morelia	Toluca, State of Mexico
12:00	Ríos (yellow card) 36'	Report	Fernández (yellow card) 27'; Silva (yellow card) 34' (yellow-red card) 56'; Valdez (yellow card) 65'; Guzmán (yellow card) 81'	Stadium: Estadio Nemesio Díez; Attendance: 13,482; Referee: Ricardo Arellano

July 25, 2014 Round 2	Morelia	0–2	Atlas	Morelia, Michoacán
19:30	Valdez (yellow card) 31'; Zárate (yellow card) 66'; Morales (yellow card) 68'	Report	Esqueda 50'; Pérez (yellow card) 69'; Brambila 90+2'; Erpen (yellow card) 90+4'	Stadium: Estadio Morelos; Attendance: 18,426; Referee: Jorge Antonio Pérez

August 2, 2014 Round 3	León	4–0	Morelia	León, Guanajuato
20:05	Rivera 54'; Peña 73'; Cárdenas 76'; Sabah 82'	Summary	Guzmán (yellow card) 20'; Valdez (yellow card) 58'	Stadium: Estadio León; Referee: (Mexico) Miguel Angel Chacon

August 8, 2014 Round 4	Morelia	0–0	Tijuana	Morelia, Michoacán
19:30	Pereira (yellow card) 51'; Morales (yellow card) 61'	Report	Pellerano (yellow card) 67'	Stadium: Estadio Morelos; Referee: (Mexico) Fernando Guerrero

August 16, 2014 Round 5	América	3–2	Morelia	Coyoacán, Distrito Federal
17:00	Aguilar (yellow card) 9' (goal) 38'; Peralta (yellow card) 45' (goal) 90+3'; Sambueza 57'; Arroyo (yellow card) 72'	Summary	Erick Germain Aguirre (yellow card) 17'; Zárate (yellow card) 32'; Riascos 52'; Alaníz (yellow card) 67'; Guzmán (yellow card) 71'; Depetris 76'	Stadium: Estadio Azteca; Referee: (Mexico) Luis Enrique Santander

August 22, 2014 Round 6	Morelia	1–5	UANL	Morelia, Michoacán
19:30	Zamorano (yellow card) 7'; Depetris 29'; Pereira (yellow card) 90+1'	Summary	Cardozo 9' (o.g.); Pizarro (yellow card) 12' (goal) 49'; Villa 66'; Burbano 77'; Guerrón (yellow card) 88'; Álvarez 90+4'	Stadium: Estadio Morelos; Referee: (Mexico) Leon Barajas

August 30, 2014 Round 7	Puebla	3–2	Morelia	Puebla, Puebla
17:00	Cosme 22' 61' (yellow card) 54'; Acuña 58'; Loroña (yellow card) 66'	Summary	Alaníz 37' (yellow card) 73'; Sansores 39' (yellow card) 75'; Depetris (yellow card) 40'; Guzmán (yellow card) 56'; Huiqui (yellow card) 66'	Stadium: Estadio Cuauhtémoc; Referee: (Mexico) Oscar Macias

September 13, 2014 Round 8	Chiapas	1–1	Morelia	Tuxtla Gutiérrez, Chiapas
21:00	Arizala 2' (yellow card) 83'; Bruno Pires (yellow card) 46'; Pérez (yellow card) 89'	Summary	Depetris 47'; Zamorano (yellow card) 52'; Rodríguez (yellow card) 68'; Huiqui (yellow card) 69'	Stadium: Estadio Víctor Manuel Reyna; Referee: (Mexico) Erim Ramirez

September 19, 2014 Round 9	Morelia	2–3	UNAM	Morelia, Michoacán
19:30	Olvera (yellow card) 29'; Erick Aguirre 65'; Romagnoli 90' (o.g.)	Summary	Olvera 23' (o.g.); Herrera 47'; Sosa 56'; Van Rankin (yellow card) 81'	Stadium: Estadio Morelos; Referee: (Mexico) Erik Miranda

September 27, 2014 Round 10	U. de G.	1–2	Morelia	Guadalajara, Jalisco
21:00	Luis Fernando Télles (yellow card) 57'; Crosas 72'; José Wenceslao Díaz (yellow card) 85'	Summary	Guzmán 24'; Alaníz (yellow card) 58'; Zárate 61'; Valdez (yellow card) 85'	Stadium: Estadio Jalisco; Referee: (Mexico) Miguel Chacon

October 1, 2014 Round 11	Morelia	0–1	Pachuca	Morelia, Michoacán
20:00	González (yellow card) 15'; Cardozo (yellow card) 58'; Zárate (yellow card) 75'; Huiqui (yellow card) 84'	Summary	Nahuelpan 3' (yellow card) 86'; Erick Gutiérrez (yellow card) 27'	Stadium: Estadio Morelos; Referee: (Mexico) Fernando Guerrero

October 4, 2014 Round 12	Santos Laguna	2–2	Morelia	Torreón, Coahuila
20:00	Orozco 45'; Rentería 47'	Summary	Morales 63'; Alaníz 81' (pen.)	Stadium: Estadio Corona; Referee: (Mexico) Paul Delgadillo

October 17, 2014 Round 13	Morelia	0–1	Veracruz	Morelia, Michoacán
19:30	Valdez (yellow card) 63'; Riascos (yellow card) 64'; Morales (yellow card) 90+4'	Summary	Villalva 29'; Mascorro (yellow card) 35'; Hernández (yellow card) 37'; García (yellow card) 50'	Stadium: Estadio Morelos; Referee: (Mexico) Erick Miranda

October 25, 2014 Round 14	Cruz Azul	3–1	Morelia	Benito Juárez, Distrito Federal
17:00	Pavone 10' 70'; Giménez 65'	Summary	Oscar Fernández (yellow card) 11'; Guzmán 39'; Silva (yellow card) 74'; Zamorano (yellow card) 85'	Stadium: Estadio Azul; Referee: (Mexico) Oscar Macias

October 31, 2014 Round 15	Morelia	2–1	Monterrey	Morelia, Michoacán
19:30	Morales (yellow card) 50'; Depetris 54' (red card) 77'; Ruiz 74'; Rodríguez (yellow card) 90+1'	Summary	Victor Ramos (yellow card) 28'; Guzmán 45' (o.g.)	Stadium: Estadio Morelos; Referee: (Mexico) Miguel Ayala

November 7, 2014 Round 16	Querétaro	2–0	Morelia	Querétaro, Querétaro
19:30	Escalante 31' (yellow card) 70'; Camilo Sanvezzo 56' (pen.); Osorio (yellow card) 57'; Hernández (yellow card) 83'	Summary	Morales (yellow card) 29'; Zamorano (yellow card) 84'; Alaníz (yellow card) 90'	Stadium: Estadio Corregidora; Referee: (Mexico) Jorge Pérez Durán

November 21, 2014 Round 17	Morelia	1–2	Guadalajara	Morelia, Michoacán
19:30	Morales 44'; Erick Aguirre (yellow card) 71'; Óscar Fernández (yellow card) 74'; Morales (yellow card) 90+1'	Summary	Bravo 6' 14'; Fierro (yellow card) 55'	Stadium: Estadio Morelos; Referee: (Mexico) Luis Enrique Santander

=== Goalscorers ===
==== Regular season ====
Position	Nation	Name	Goals scored
TOTAL			0

=== Results ===
==== Results summary ====
Overall								Home						Away					
Pld	W	D	L	GF	GA	GD	Pts	W	D	L	GF	GA	GD	W	D	L	GF	GA	GD
17	2	4	11	16	34	−18	10	1	1	6	6	15	−9	1	3	5	10	19	−9

Last updated: 21 November 2014.
Source: Apertura 2014 results

==== Results by round ====
Round	1	2	3	4	5	6	7	8	9	10	11	12	13	14	15	16	17
Ground	A	H	A	H	A	H	A	A	H	A	H	A	H	A	H	A	H
Result	D	L	L	D	L	L	L	D	L	W	L	D	L	L	W	L	L
Position	17	17	17	17	17	17	17	17	17	18	18	18	18	18	18	18	18

Updated to match(es) played on 21 November 2014. Source: Apertura 2014 results and mediotiempo.com
A = Away; H = Home; W = Win; D = Draw; L = Loss
