= List of Mexican football transfers winter 2015–16 =

This is the list of Mexican football transfers of the Mexican Primera Division during the winter 2015–16 transfer window, grouped by club. It only includes football transfers related to clubs from the Liga Bancomer MX, the first division of Mexican football

== Liga Bancomer MX ==
=== América ===
In: Note: Flags indicate national team as defined under FIFA eligibility rules; some limited exceptions apply. Players may hold more than one non-FIFA nationality.

No.	Pos.	Nation	Player
7	MF	BRA	William (from Querétaro)
18	MF	URU	Brian Lozano (from (Uruguay) Defensor Sporting)
27	FW	MEX	Jesús Moreno (on loan from Oaxaca)

Out: Note: Flags indicate national team as defined under FIFA eligibility rules; some limited exceptions apply. Players may hold more than one non-FIFA nationality.

No.	Pos.	Nation	Player
7	FW	MEX	Adrián Marín (loan return to Chiapas)
16	MF	MEX	Alfonso Sánchez (on loan to Oaxaca)
18	DF	MEX	Jonathan Sánchez (on loan to Oaxaca)
19	FW	MEX	Martín Zúñiga (on loan to Sinaloa)
—	FW	MEX	Alberto García (loan return to Atlante)
—	MF	ARG	Gonzalo Díaz (on loan to Tijuana, previously on loan at (Argentina) Godoy Cruz)
—	FW	COL	Luis Gabriel Rey (on loan to Morelia, previously on loan at Puebla)

=== Atlas ===
In: Note: Flags indicate national team as defined under FIFA eligibility rules; some limited exceptions apply. Players may hold more than one non-FIFA nationality.

No.	Pos.	Nation	Player
1	GK	ARG	Oscar Ustari (from (Argentina) Newell's Old Boys)
4	DF	MEX	Rafael Márquez (from (Italy) Hellas Verona)
16	MF	URU	Egidio Arévalo Ríos (on loan from UANL)
18	MF	MEX	Dieter Villalpando (on loan from Morelia)
20	MF	MEX	Julio Nava (on loan from Chiapas)
25	MF	MEX	José Madueña (on loan from Tijuana)
29	DF	MEX	Rodrigo Salinas (on loan from Tijuana)

Out: Note: Flags indicate national team as defined under FIFA eligibility rules; some limited exceptions apply. Players may hold more than one non-FIFA nationality.

No.	Pos.	Nation	Player
1	GK	CHI	Miguel Pinto (on loan to Tapachula)
2	DF	MEX	Iván Pineda (on loan to Juárez)
4	DF	USA	Greg Garza (loan return to Tijuana)
6	DF	MEX	Juan Carlos Valenzuela (on loan to Tijuana)
7	MF	MEX	Juan de Dios Hernández (on loan to Tapachula)
12	MF	MEX	Rodolfo Vilchis (on loan to Morelia)
13	MF	MEX	Jorge Zárate (loan return to Morelia)
18	MF	COL	Aldo Leão Ramírez (on loan to Cruz Azul)
19	MF	COL	Eisner Loboa (on loan to Morelia)
20	FW	PAR	Luis Nery Caballero (on loan to (Paraguay) Olimpia)
22	MF	MEX	Pablo Mascareñas (on loan to Oaxaca)
24	DF	MEX	Rodrigo Godínez (on loan to Veracruz)
25	MF	MEX	Luis Télles (on loan to Juárez)
27	MF	MEX	Juan Pablo Vigón (on loan to Chiapas)
81	GK	MEX	Alan López (on loan to Venados)
—	MF	MEX	Carlos Treviño (on loan to Venados, previously on loan at Necaxa)

=== Chiapas ===
In: Note: Flags indicate national team as defined under FIFA eligibility rules; some limited exceptions apply. Players may hold more than one non-FIFA nationality.

No.	Pos.	Nation	Player
7	FW	ARG	Alexis Canelo (from (Argentina) Quilmes)
9	FW	MEX	Adrián Marín (loan return from América)
11	MF	BRA	Danilinho (on loan from Querétaro)
17	MF	MEX	Alonso Zamora (on loan from UANL)
22	MF	MEX	Juan Pablo Vigón (on loan from Atlas)
30	GK	MEX	Jesús Rodríguez (on loan from Puebla)
83	FW	MEX	Julio Gómez (on loan from Pachuca)

Out: Note: Flags indicate national team as defined under FIFA eligibility rules; some limited exceptions apply. Players may hold more than one non-FIFA nationality.

No.	Pos.	Nation	Player
7	MF	MEX	Julio Nava (on loan to Atlas)
9	MF	CHI	Mathías Vidangossy (on loan to UNAM)
11	MF	MEX	Jehu Chiapas (loan return to Veracruz)
14	FW	MEX	Luis Loroña (on loan to Atlante)
15	MF	MEX	Pedro Vargas (loan return to Tapachula)
16	FW	MEX	Darío Carreño (on loan to Tapachula)
—	DF	BRA	Bruno Pires (on loan to Tapachula, previously on loan)
—	MF	MEX	Francisco Acuña (on loan to BUAP, previously on loan)
—	MF	PAR	David Mendieta (on loan to Atlante, previously on loan at (Paraguay) Cerro Porteño)

=== Cruz Azul ===
In: Note: Flags indicate national team as defined under FIFA eligibility rules; some limited exceptions apply. Players may hold more than one non-FIFA nationality.

No.	Pos.	Nation	Player
7	MF	ESP	Víctor Vázquez (from (Belgium) Brugge)
9	FW	ECU	Joffre Guerrón (from UANL)
14	MF	COL	Aldo Leão Ramírez (on loan from Atlas)

Out: Note: Flags indicate national team as defined under FIFA eligibility rules; some limited exceptions apply. Players may hold more than one non-FIFA nationality.

No.	Pos.	Nation	Player
7	FW	BRA	Lucas Silva (on loan to Pachuca)
15	DF	MEX	Gerardo Flores (on loan to Toluca)
17	DF	ARG	Emanuel Loeschbor (on loan to Morelia)
19	FW	MEX	Jerónimo Amione (on loan to Puebla)
21	MF	MEX	Xavier Báez (on loan to Necaxa)
25	MF	ARG	Fernando Belluschi (to (Argentina) San Lorenzo)
33	MF	ARG	Federico Carrizo (loan return to (Argentina) Boca Juniors)
—	GK	MEX	Yosgart Gutiérrez (on loan to Necaxa, previously on loan at UNAM)
—	MF	MEX	Alejandro Vela (on loan to Necaxa)

=== Guadalajara ===
In: Note: Flags indicate national team as defined under FIFA eligibility rules; some limited exceptions apply. Players may hold more than one non-FIFA nationality.

No.	Pos.	Nation	Player
7	MF	MEX	Orbelín Pineda (from Querétaro)
18	MF	MEX	Giovani Hernández (loan return from Sinaloa)
26	MF	MEX	Carlos Peña (from León)
34	GK	MEX	Miguel Jiménez (loan return from Tepic)
83	FW	MEX	Marco Granados (loan return from Venados)

Out: Note: Flags indicate national team as defined under FIFA eligibility rules; some limited exceptions apply. Players may hold more than one non-FIFA nationality.

No.	Pos.	Nation	Player
5	MF	MEX	Jorge Enríquez (on loan to León)
7	FW	MEX	Carlos Fierro (on loan to Querétaro)
33	MF	MEX	Marco Fabián (to (Germany) Eintracht Frankfurt)
—	DF	MEX	Mario de Luna (on loan to Necaxa, previously on loan at Puebla)
—	DF	MEX	Abraham Coronado (on loan to Tepic, previously on loan at Toluca)
—	DF	MEX	Édgar Solís (on loan to Celaya, previously on loan at (Costa Rica) Herediano)

=== León ===
In: Note: Flags indicate national team as defined under FIFA eligibility rules; some limited exceptions apply. Players may hold more than one non-FIFA nationality.

No.	Pos.	Nation	Player
9	FW	ARG	Germán Cano (on loan from Pachuca)
15	MF	MEX	Jorge Enríquez (on loan from Guadalajara)
18	MF	ARG	Maxi Moralez (from (Italy) Atalanta)
22	FW	ARG	Juan Cuevas (on loan from Zacatecas)

Out: Note: Flags indicate national team as defined under FIFA eligibility rules; some limited exceptions apply. Players may hold more than one non-FIFA nationality.

No.	Pos.	Nation	Player
9	FW	MEX	Miguel Sabah (end of contract)
15	MF	MEX	Steven Almeida (loan return to Pachuca)
18	FW	ARG	Gonzálo Ríos (loan return to (Argentina) Boca Unidos)
27	MF	MEX	Carlos Peña (to Guadalajara)

=== Monterrey ===
In: Note: Flags indicate national team as defined under FIFA eligibility rules; some limited exceptions apply. Players may hold more than one non-FIFA nationality.

No.	Pos.	Nation	Player
13	MF	URU	Carlos Sánchez (from (Argentina) River Plate)
33	MF	ECU	Walter Ayoví (from Sinaloa)
34	DF	MEX	Miguel Herrera (on loan from Pachuca)

Out: Note: Flags indicate national team as defined under FIFA eligibility rules; some limited exceptions apply. Players may hold more than one non-FIFA nationality.

No.	Pos.	Nation	Player
2	MF	MEX	Severo Meza (on loan to Sinaloa)
3	DF	COL	Stefan Medina (on loan to Pachuca)
—	FW	COL	Yimmi Chará (on loan to Sinaloa, previously on loan at (Colombia) Atletico Nacional)
—	FW	COL	Wilson Morelo (on loan to Sinaloa, previously on loan at (Colombia) Independiente Santa Fe)

=== Morelia ===
In: Note: Flags indicate national team as defined under FIFA eligibility rules; some limited exceptions apply. Players may hold more than one non-FIFA nationality.

No.	Pos.	Nation	Player
10	FW	ARG	Alejandro Gagliardi (from (Argentina) Nueva Chicago)
11	MF	MEX	Jorge Zárate (loan return from Atlas)
12	MF	MEX	Rodolfo Vilchis (on loan from Atlas)
17	DF	ARG	Emanuel Loeschbor (on loan from Cruz Azul)
18	FW	COL	Luis Gabriel Rey (on loan from América)
19	MF	COL	Eisner Loboa (on loan from Atlas)

Out: Note: Flags indicate national team as defined under FIFA eligibility rules; some limited exceptions apply. Players may hold more than one non-FIFA nationality.

No.	Pos.	Nation	Player
6	DF	MEX	Joel Huiqui (on loan to Tapachula)
9	FW	COL	Yorleys Mena (on loan to UdeG)
10	MF	ARG	Mauro Cejas (loan return to Santos Laguna)
11	FW	MEX	Carlos Ochoa (loan return to Santos Laguna)
14	FW	MEX	Óscar Fernández (on loan to Necaxa)
17	MF	MEX	Hibert Ruiz (on loan to UNAM)
18	DF	MEX	Marco Palacios (loan return to UNAM)
24	MF	MEX	Dieter Villalpando (on loan to Atlas)
25	FW	MEX	Carlos Calvo (on loan to Veracruz)
26	MF	MEX	Christian Valdez (on loan to Puebla)
—	FW	CHI	Héctor Mancilla (on loan to UANL, previously on loan at Sinaloa)

=== Pachuca ===
In: Note: Flags indicate national team as defined under FIFA eligibility rules; some limited exceptions apply. Players may hold more than one non-FIFA nationality.

No.	Pos.	Nation	Player
12	MF	MEX	Emmanuel García (from Veracruz)
14	MF	MEX	Steven Almeida (loan return from León)
19	FW	PAR	Gustavo Ramírez (loan return from Zacatecas)
22	FW	BRA	Lucas Silva (on loan from Cruz Azul)
23	DF	COL	Óscar Murillo (from (Colombia) Atlético Nacional)
25	MF	MEX	Manuel Pérez (on loan from UNAM, previously on loan)
26	MF	MEX	Héctor Mascorro (loan return from Zacatecas)
28	GK	MEX	Rafael Ramírez (on loan from Zacatecas)
30	DF	USA	Omar Gonzalez (from (United States) LA Galaxy)
31	MF	MEX	Iván Ochoa (loan return from Zacatecas)
33	DF	COL	Stefan Medina (on loan from Monterrey)

Out: Note: Flags indicate national team as defined under FIFA eligibility rules; some limited exceptions apply. Players may hold more than one non-FIFA nationality.

No.	Pos.	Nation	Player
12	DF	MEX	Heriberto Olvera (on loan to Zacatecas)
14	FW	ARG	Germán Cano (on loan to León)
19	FW	ARG	Dario Cvitanich (released)
22	FW	MEX	Guillermo Martínez (on loan to BUAP)
24	DF	MEX	Miguel Herrera (on loan to Monterrey)
26	MF	MEX	Fernando Madrigal (on loan to Zacatecas)
31	GK	URU	Sebastián Sosa (on loan to Zacatecas)
299	MF	MEX	Mauro Laínez (on loan to Zacatecas)

=== Puebla ===
In: Note: Flags indicate national team as defined under FIFA eligibility rules; some limited exceptions apply. Players may hold more than one non-FIFA nationality.

No.	Pos.	Nation	Player
4	MF	MEX	Sergio Ceballos (on loan from Santos Laguna)
5	DF	MEX	Edgar Dueñas (on loan from Toluca)
7	MF	MEX	Carlos Orrantía (on loan from Santos Laguna)
9	MF	ARG	Mauro Cejas (on loan from Santos Laguna)
13	FW	MEX	Jerónimo Amione (on loan from Cruz Azul)
18	FW	MEX	Eduardo Pérez (loan return from BUAP)
20	FW	URU	Álvaro Navarro (on loan from (Uruguay) Defensor Sporting)
23	MF	MEX	Christian Valdez (on loan from Morelia)
24	DF	MEX	Sergio Pérez (Unattached)
29	MF	ARG	Damián Escudero (from (Brazil) Vitória)

Out: Note: Flags indicate national team as defined under FIFA eligibility rules; some limited exceptions apply. Players may hold more than one non-FIFA nationality.

No.	Pos.	Nation	Player
5	DF	MEX	Mario de Luna (loan return to Guadalajara)
13	MF	MEX	Alfonso Tamay (on loan to Tapachula)
14	FW	CHI	Isaac Díaz (on loan to Tapachula)
15	MF	MEX	Alfredo Juraidini (on loan to (Paraguay) River Plate)
20	DF	MEX	Adrián Cortés (on loan to Tapachula)
21	FW	COL	Luis Gabriel Rey (loan return to América)
23	DF	MEX	Emmanuel Gil (on loan to Tapachula)

=== Querétaro ===
In: Note: Flags indicate national team as defined under FIFA eligibility rules; some limited exceptions apply. Players may hold more than one non-FIFA nationality.

No.	Pos.	Nation	Player
8	MF	USA	Luis Gil (from (United States) Real Salt Lake)
9	FW	MEX	Carlos Fierro (on loan from Guadalajara)
16	MF	ARG	Nery Domínguez (from (Argentina) Rosario Central)
18	MF	MEX	Ricardo Esqueda (Unattached)
30	FW	ARG	Emanuel Villa (from UANL, previously on loan)

Out: Note: Flags indicate national team as defined under FIFA eligibility rules; some limited exceptions apply. Players may hold more than one non-FIFA nationality.

No.	Pos.	Nation	Player
8	MF	BRA	Danilinho (on loan to Chiapas)
9	MF	MEX	Orbelín Pineda (to Guadalajara)
11	MF	BRA	William (to América)
16	DF	MEX	Kevin Gutiérrez (on loan to Tijuana)
29	MF	BRA	Wilson Tiago (loan return to Veracruz)
—	DF	MEX	Manuel López Mondragón (on loan to UAT, previously on loan)
—	MF	MEX	Gerardo Espinoza (on loan to BUAP, previously on loan)
—	MF	MEX	López (on loan to Veracruz, previously on loan at Venados)
—	FW	MEX	Isaac Romo (on loan to UdeG, previously on loan at Sonora)

=== Santos Laguna ===
In: Note: Flags indicate national team as defined under FIFA eligibility rules; some limited exceptions apply. Players may hold more than one non-FIFA nationality.

No.	Pos.	Nation	Player
6	MF	MEX	Diego de Buen (from Tijuana)
17	MF	MEX	Ulises Dávila (from (England) Chelsea, previously on loan at (Portugal) Vitória)
19	DF	USA	Jorge Villafaña (from (United States) Portland Timbers)
22	FW	ARG	Martín Bravo (on loan from Sinaloa)

Out: Note: Flags indicate national team as defined under FIFA eligibility rules; some limited exceptions apply. Players may hold more than one non-FIFA nationality.

No.	Pos.	Nation	Player
6	MF	MEX	Sergio Ceballos (on loan to Puebla)
13	DF	MEX	Héctor Acosta (loan return to Toluca)
17	MF	MEX	Alonso Escoboza (to Tijuana)
23	MF	MEX	Carlos Orrantía (on loan to Puebla)
—	DF	MEX	Uriel Álvarez (on loan to Atlético SL, previously on loan at Tijuana)
—	MF	ARG	Mauro Cejas (on loan to Puebla, previously on loan at Morelia)

=== Sinaloa ===
In: Note: Flags indicate national team as defined under FIFA eligibility rules; some limited exceptions apply. Players may hold more than one non-FIFA nationality.

No.	Pos.	Nation	Player
6	DF	MEX	Severo Meza (on loan from Monterrey)
7	FW	COL	Wilson Morelo (on loan from Monterrey)
10	FW	MEX	Freddy Martín (on loan from Venados)
11	MF	USA	Joe Corona (on loan from Veracruz)
15	DF	MEX	Heriberto Aguayo (on loan from Zacatecas)
22	MF	URU	Mathías Cardaccio (on loan from (Uruguay) Defensor Sporting)
23	FW	COL	Yimmi Chará (on loan from Monterrey)
26	DF	MEX	Jairo González (on loan from UdeG)
27	FW	MEX	Martín Zúñiga (on loan from América)
29	MF	BRA	Wilson Tiago (on loan from Veracruz)
33	FW	USA	Sonny Guadarrama (on loan from Atlante)

Out: Note: Flags indicate national team as defined under FIFA eligibility rules; some limited exceptions apply. Players may hold more than one non-FIFA nationality.

No.	Pos.	Nation	Player
9	FW	CHI	Héctor Mancilla (loan return to Morelia)
10	FW	ARG	Martín Bravo (on loan to Santos Laguna)
11	FW	ECU	Marcos Caicedo (on loan to Zacatecas)
15	FW	MEX	Raúl Enríquez (loan return to Tijuana)
16	MF	MEX	Adolfo Domínguez (loan return to Tijuana)
20	FW	PAN	Roberto Nurse (on loan to Zacatecas)
23	DF	MEX	David Stringel (on loan to Juárez)
27	MF	MEX	Christian López (on loan to Zacatecas)
30	MF	ECU	Walter Ayoví (to Monterrey)
33	MF	MEX	Giovani Hernández (loan return to Guadalajara)

=== Tijuana ===
In: Note: Flags indicate national team as defined under FIFA eligibility rules; some limited exceptions apply. Players may hold more than one non-FIFA nationality.

No.	Pos.	Nation	Player
4	DF	USA	Greg Garza (loan return from Atlas)
8	MF	BRA	Juninho (from (United States) LA Galaxy)
10	MF	MEX	Alonso Escoboza (from Santos Laguna)
18	DF	MEX	Juan Carlos Valenzuela (on loan from Atlas)
21	MF	MEX	Kevin Gutiérrez (on loan from Querétaro)
23	MF	ARG	Gonzalo Díaz (on loan from América)

Out: Note: Flags indicate national team as defined under FIFA eligibility rules; some limited exceptions apply. Players may hold more than one non-FIFA nationality.

No.	Pos.	Nation	Player
4	DF	MEX	Uriel Álvarez (loan return to Santos Laguna)
8	MF	MEX	Diego de Buen (to Santos Laguna)
9	FW	ARG	Alfredo Moreno (on loan to Celaya)
10	FW	COL	Humberto Osorio (on loan to (Argentina) Defensa y Justicia)
18	MF	VEN	Juan Arango (to (United States) New York Cosmos)
23	FW	CHI	Felipe Flores (released)
27	MF	MEX	José Madueña (on loan to Atlas)
28	MF	MEX	Édgar Villegas (to Zacatecas)
29	DF	MEX	Rodrigo Salinas (on loan to Atlas)
—	MF	MEX	Adolfo Domínguez (on loan to Juárez, previously on loan at Sinaloa)
—	MF	USA	Esteban Rodriguez (on loan to Atlante, previously on loan at Sinaloa)
—	FW	MEX	Raúl Enríquez (on loan to Zacatecas, previously on loan at Sinaloa)

=== Toluca ===
In: Note: Flags indicate national team as defined under FIFA eligibility rules; some limited exceptions apply. Players may hold more than one non-FIFA nationality.

No.	Pos.	Nation	Player
14	MF	PAR	Richard Ortiz (loan return from (Paraguay) Libertad)
33	DF	MEX	Gerardo Flores (on loan from Cruz Azul)

Out: Note: Flags indicate national team as defined under FIFA eligibility rules; some limited exceptions apply. Players may hold more than one non-FIFA nationality.

No.	Pos.	Nation	Player
—	DF	MEX	Edgar Dueñas (on loan to Puebla)
—	DF	MEX	Héctor Acosta (on loan to Oaxaca, previously on loan at Santos Laguna)
—	DF	MEX	Abraham Coronado (loan return to Guadalajara, previously on loan at Necaxa)

=== UANL ===
In: Note: Flags indicate national team as defined under FIFA eligibility rules; some limited exceptions apply. Players may hold more than one non-FIFA nationality.

No.	Pos.	Nation	Player
5	FW	PAR	Fernando Fernández (from (Paraguay) Guaraní)
8	MF	ARG	Lucas Zelarayán (from (Argentina) Belgrano)
17	FW	CHI	Héctor Mancilla (on loan from Morelia)

Out: Note: Flags indicate national team as defined under FIFA eligibility rules; some limited exceptions apply. Players may hold more than one non-FIFA nationality.

No.	Pos.	Nation	Player
5	MF	URU	Egidio Arévalo Ríos (on loan to Atlas)
8	FW	ECU	Joffre Guerrón (to Cruz Azul)
16	FW	MEX	Enrique Esqueda (on loan to Veracruz)
23	MF	MEX	Gerardo Lugo (on loan to Veracruz)
30	FW	MEX	Amaury Escoto (on loan to Tapachula)
35	MF	MEX	Alonso Zamora (on loan to Chiapas)
—	DF	COL	Francisco Meza (on loan to UNAM, previously on loan at (Colombia) Santa Fe)
—	FW	ARG	Emanuel Villa (to Querétaro, previously on loan)
—	FW	MEX	Emmanuel Cerda (on loan to Murciélagos)

=== UNAM ===
In: Note: Flags indicate national team as defined under FIFA eligibility rules; some limited exceptions apply. Players may hold more than one non-FIFA nationality.

No.	Pos.	Nation	Player
17	MF	MEX	Hibert Ruiz (on loan from Morelia)
19	MF	CHI	Mathías Vidangossy (on loan from Chiapas)
24	FW	COL	Luis Quiñones (from (Colombia) Junior de Barranquilla)
28	DF	COL	Francisco Meza (on loan from UANL)

Out: Note: Flags indicate national team as defined under FIFA eligibility rules; some limited exceptions apply. Players may hold more than one non-FIFA nationality.

No.	Pos.	Nation	Player
17	GK	MEX	Yosgart Gutiérrez (loan return to Cruz Azul)
—	DF	MEX	Antonio García (on loan to Zacatepec, previously on loan)
—	DF	MEX	Érik Vera (on loan to Necaxa, previously on loan at Venados)
—	DF	MEX	Alan Mendoza (on loan to Necaxa, previously on loan at Venados)
—	MF	MEX	Manuel Pérez (on loan to Pachuca, previously on loan)
—	FW	URU	Jonathan Ramis (on loan to Zacatepec, previously on loan at (Uruguay) Racing de Montevideo)

=== Veracruz ===
In: Note: Flags indicate national team as defined under FIFA eligibility rules; some limited exceptions apply. Players may hold more than one non-FIFA nationality.

No.	Pos.	Nation	Player
3	DF	MEX	Carlos Calvo (on loan from Morelia)
4	DF	MEX	Rodrigo Godínez (on loan from Atlas)
14	MF	MEX	Emilio López (on loan from Querétaro)
16	FW	MEX	Enrique Esqueda (on loan from UANL)
19	FW	COL	Cristian Borja (loan return from Lobos BUAP)
25	DF	MEX	Juan Fernández (on loan from Celaya)
32	MF	MEX	Gerardo Lugo (on loan from UANL)
—	MF	MEX	Sebastián Saucedo (on loan from (United States) Real Salt Lake)

Out: Note: Flags indicate national team as defined under FIFA eligibility rules; some limited exceptions apply. Players may hold more than one non-FIFA nationality.

No.	Pos.	Nation	Player
1	MF	MEX	Luis Sánchez (on loan to Venados)
14	DF	MEX	Víctor Perales (on loan to Venados)
15	MF	USA	Joe Corona (on loan to Sinaloa)
16	MF	MEX	César de la Peña (on loan to Oaxaca)
17	MF	MEX	Emmanuel García (to Pachuca)
19	FW	MEX	Aníbal Zurdo (loan return to Cruz Azul)
—	MF	BRA	Wilson Tiago (on loan to Sinaloa, previously on loan at Querétaro)
—	FW	URU	Liber Quiñones (on loan to Venados, previously on loan at (Uruguay) Racing de Montevideo)

== See also ==
- 2015–16 Liga MX season
