= Apertura 2013 Copa MX =

Tournament details
- Country: Mexico
- Teams: 28

Final positions
- Champions: Morelia (1st title)
- Runners-up: Atlas

Tournament statistics
- Matches played: 91
- Goals scored: 223 (2.45 per match)
- Top goal scorer: Jahir Barraza (6 goals)

The Copa 2013 MX Apertura was the 70th staging of the Copa MX, the 43rd staging in the professional era and is the third tournament played since the 1996–97 edition.

This tournament started on July 23, 2013, and concluded on November 5, 2013. The winner faced the winner of the Clausura 2014 edition in a playoff to qualify as Mexico 3 to the 2015 Copa Libertadores.

Morelia won their first title after defeating Atlas 3–1 on penalty kicks.

== Participants Apertura 2013 ==
This tournament will feature all the clubs from the Liga MX, excluding those that will participate in the 2013-14 CONCACAF Champions League (Tijuana, Toluca, América and Cruz Azul), and all the teams from the Ascenso MX, excluding the team promoted from Segunda División (Ballenas Galeana).

== Tiebreakers ==
If two or more clubs are equal on points on completion of the group matches, the following criteria are applied to determine the rankings:

1. superior goal difference;
2. higher number of goals scored;
3. scores of the group matches played among the clubs in question;
4. higher number of goals scored away in the group matches played among the clubs in question;
5. best position in the Relegation table;
6. fair play ranking;
7. drawing of lots.

== Group stage ==
Every group is composed by four clubs, two from Liga MX and two from Ascenso MX. Instead of a traditional robin-round schedule, the clubs will play in three two-legged "rounds", the last one being contested by clubs of the same league.

Each win gives a club 3 points, each draw gives 1 point. An extra point is awarded for every round won; a round is won by aggregated score, and if it is a tie, the extra point will be awarded to the team with higher number of goals scored away.

Key to colours in group tables
Group winners advance to the Championship Stage
Best runner-up also advances to the Championship Stage

All times are UTC-05:00

=== Group 1 ===
Pos	Team	Pld	W	D	L	RW	GF	GA	GD	Pts	
1	Monterrey	6	4	2	0	3	11	4	+7	17	Group winner
2	UAT	6	2	3	1	2	8	9	−1	11	
3	Altamira	6	1	2	3	1	6	8	−2	6	
4	Puebla	6	0	3	3	0	6	10	−4	3	

Updated to match(es) played on unknown. Source:
July 23, 2013
19:00

Puebla	2–2	Altamira
Martínez 62'; Ruiz 90'	Report	González 60'; García 76'

Estadio Cuauhtémoc, Puebla, Puebla
Attendance: 5,299
Referee: Roberto Ríos Jácome
August 7, 2013
19:00

Altamira	2–0	Puebla
Charles 14'; Jasso 74'	Report

Estadio Altamira, Altamira, Tamaulipas
Referee: Arturo Cruz Hurtado

Altamira won the round 4–2 on aggregate

July 24, 2013
21:00

Monterrey	4–1	UAT
Zavala 24'; Pabón 34', 86'; García 84'	Report	Ocampo 44'

Estadio Tecnológico, Monterrey, Nuevo Leon
Attendance: 13,200
Referee: Erick Miranda
August 7, 2013
21:00

UAT	1–1	Monterrey
O. Garciía 39' (o.g.)	Report	Rivera 51'

Estadio Marte R. Gómez, Ciudad Victoria, Tamaulipas
Attendance: 8,903
Referee: Ángel Monroy Bello

Monterrey won the round 5–2 on aggregate

August 20, 2013
19:00

Puebla	2–3	UAT
Victorino 19'; Quezada 33'	Report	Auhmada 29'; Tamay 30'; Íñiguez 55'

Estadio Cuauhtémoc, Puebla, Puebla
Attendance: 4,054
Referee: Erick Yair Miranda
August 27, 2013
21:00

UAT	1–1	Puebla
Pacheco 3'	Report	González 60'

Estadio Marte R. Gómez, Ciudad Victoria, Tamaulipas
Attendance: 2,812
Referee: Óscar Villagómez

UAT won the round 4–3 on aggregate

August 21, 2013
21:00

Monterrey	2–0	Altamira
Acosta 68'; Madrigal 86'	Report

Estadio Tecnológico, Monterrey, Nuevo Leon
Attendance: 13,322
Referee: Roberto Ríos Jácome
August 28, 2013
21:00

Altamira	1–2	Monterrey
Tapia 64'	Report	Madrigal 37', 63'

Estadio Altamira, Altamira, Tamaulipas
Attendance: 4,300
Referee: Jorge Adán Tonix

Monterrey won the round 4–1 on aggregate

September 17, 2013
19:00

Puebla	0–1	Monterrey
	Report	Madrigal 48'

Estadio Cuauhtémoc, Puebla, Puebla
Attendance: 2,240
Referee: Víctor Bisguerra
September 24, 2013
21:00

Monterrey	1–1	Puebla
B. Hernández 43'	Report	Ruvalcaba 35'

Estadio Tecnológico, Monterrey, Nuevo Leon
Attendance: 16,895
Referee: Roberto Ríos Jácome

Monterrey won the round 2–1 on aggregate

September 18, 2013
19:00

Altamira	1–2	UAT
Fernández 53'	Report	Saucedo 39'; Nurse 78'

Estadio Altamira, Altamira, Tamaulipas
Attendance: 1,100
Referee: Emerson Gustavo Zamora
September 24, 2013
21:00

UAT	0–0	Altamira
	Report

Estadio Marte R. Gómez, Ciudad Victoria, Tamaulipas
Attendance: 2,608
Referee: Marco Ortiz

UAT won the round 2–1 on aggregate

=== Group 2 ===
Pos	Team	Pld	W	D	L	RW	GF	GA	GD	Pts	
1	UANL	6	3	1	2	2	9	5	+4	12	Group winner
2	Santos Laguna	6	2	3	1	1	9	8	+1	10	
3	Cruz Azul Hidalgo	6	1	5	0	2	2	1	+1	10	
4	Zacatepec	6	0	3	3	0	5	11	−6	3	

Updated to match(es) played on unknown. Source:
July 23, 2013
21:00

Santos Laguna	3–0	Zacatepec
Cejas 47'; Escoboza 60'; Quintero 75'	Report

Estadio Corona, Torreón, Coahuila
Attendance: 13,353
Referee: Luis Enrique Santander
August 6, 2013
17:00

Zacatepec	3–3	Santos Laguna
A. González 9'; Esparza 69'; Minda 72'	Report	Herrera 46'; Quintero 58', 80'

Estadio Centenario, Cuernavaca, Morelos
Attendance: 7,100
Referee: Adonai Escobedo

Santos Laguna won the round 6–3 on aggregate

July 24, 2013
15:00

Cruz Azul Hidalgo	1–0	UANL
Pedroza 32'	Report

Estadio 10 de Diciembre, Jasso, Hidalgo
Attendance: 2,464
Referee: Mauricio Martínez
August 7, 2013
21:00

UANL	0–0	Cruz Azul Hidalgo
	Report

Estadio Universitario, San Nicolás de los Garza, Nuevo León
Attendance: 19,432
Referee: Víctor Bisguerra

Cruz Azul Hidalgo won the round 1–0 on aggregate

August 20, 2013
15:00

Cruz Azul Hidalgo	0–0	Santos Laguna
	Report

Estadio 10 de Diciembre, Jasso, Hidalgo
Attendance: 1,941
Referee: Diego Montaño Robles
August 27, 2013
21:00

Santos Laguna	0–0	Cruz Azul Hidalgo
	Report

Estadio Corona, Torreón, Coahuila
Attendance: 12,450
Referee: Erick Yair Miranda Galindo

Cruz Azul Hidalgo and Santos Laguna drew 0–0 on aggregate and both tied on away goals, thus neither team received the extra point

August 21, 2013
21:00

Zacatepec	1−2	UANL
M. González 44'	Report	Lugo 27'; Pulido 54'

Estadio Centenario, Cuernavaca, Morelos
Attendance: 11,575
Referee: Jorge Tonix
August 28, 2013
21:00

UANL	2−0	Zacatepec
Viniegra 38' (pen.); Castillo 90+1'	Report

Estadio Universitario, San Nicolás de los Garza, Nuevo León
Attendance: 15,825
Referee: Antony Zanjuampa

UANL won the round 4−1 on aggregate

September 17, 2013
15:00

Cruz Azul Hidalgo	0−0	Zacatepec
	Report

Estadio 10 de Diciembre, Jasso, Hidalgo
Referee: Jonathan Hernández
September 25, 2013
19:00

Zacatepec	1−1	Cruz Azul Hidalgo
Hernández 10'	Report	Sánchez 17'

Estadio Centenario, Cuernavaca, Morelos
Referee: Emerson Zamora

Cruz Azul Hidalgo won on away goals

September 18, 2013
21:00

UANL	3−0	Santos Laguna
Villa 28'; Lugo 58'; Salcido 87'	Report

Estadio Universitario, San Nicolás de los Garza, Nuevo León
Attendance: 27,495
Referee: Miguel Ángel Flores
September 24, 2013
21:00

Santos Laguna	3−2	UANL
Quintero 1', 37'; Herrera 35'	Report	Torres Mezell 41'; Pulido 72'

Estadio Corona, Torreón, Coahuila
Referee: José Antonio Pérez Durán

UANL won the round 5−3 on aggregate

=== Group 3 ===
Pos	Team	Pld	W	D	L	RW	GF	GA	GD	Pts	
1	Mérida	6	3	1	2	2	10	8	+2	12	Group winner
2	Chiapas	6	2	2	2	2	9	4	+5	10	
3	Atlante	6	3	0	3	0	5	9	−4	9	
4	Delfines	6	2	1	3	1	7	8	−1	8	

Updated to match(es) played on unknown. Source:
July 24, 2013
19:00

Atlante	1–2	Mérida
García 34'	Report	Martín 15', 19'

Estadio Andrés Quintana Roo, Cancún, Quintana Roo
Referee: Miguel Chacón
August 7, 2013
19:00

Mérida	1–2	Atlante
Román 57'	Report	R. Jiménez 69'; D. Jiménez 77'

Estadio Carlos Iturralde, Mérida, Yucatán
Attendance: 2,952
Referee: Mauricio Martínez

Atlante and Mérida drew 3–3 on aggregate and both tied on away goals, thus neither team received the extra point

July 24, 2013
19:00

Delfines	0–0	Chiapas
	Report

Unidad Deportiva Campus II, Ciudad del Carmen, Campeche
Attendance: 3,245
Referee: León Barajas
August 6, 2013
19:00

Chiapas	1–0	Delfines
Torres 36' (pen.)	Report

Estadio Víctor Manuel Reyna, Tuxtla Gutiérrez, Chiapas
Attendance: 2,188
Referee: Erick Miranda

Chiapas won the round 1–0 on aggregate

August 20, 2013
21:00

Delfines	3–1	Atlante
M. Vázquez 44', 57'; Castellanos 60'	Report	Rojas 59'

Unidad Deportiva Campus II, Ciudad del Carmen, Campeche
Attendance: 3,126
Referee: Jorge Luis Delgado Salas
August 29, 2013
19:00

Atlante	1–0	Delfines
Orozco 58'	Report

Estadio Andrés Quintana Roo, Cancún, Quintana Roo
Referee: Miguel Ángel Ayala

Delfines won the round 3–2 on aggregate

August 21, 2013
19:00

Chiapas	0–0	Mérida
	Report

Estadio Víctor Manuel Reyna, Tuxtla Gutiérrez, Chiapas
Referee: Víctor Bisguerra
August 27, 2013
19:00

Mérida	2–1	Chiapas
Ruiz 46'; López 73'	Report	Zúñiga 54'

Estadio Carlos Iturralde, Mérida, Yucatán
Attendance: 2,715
Referee: Ángel Monroy Bello

Mérida won the round 2–1 on aggregate

September 17, 2013
19:00

Delfines	1–0	Mérida
M. Vázquez 28'	Report

Unidad Deportiva Campus II, Ciudad del Carmen, Campeche
Attendance: 1,762
Referee: Bernardo Hernández
September 24, 2013
19:00

Mérida	5–3	Delfines
Martín 7'; Cazaubón 17'; Molina 50'; Rodríguez 52'; Román 71'	Report	Sainz 47'; Rosas 55', 66'

Estadio Carlos Iturralde, Mérida, Yucatán
Attendance: 2,178
Referee: Mario Alcántara

Mérida won the round 5–4 on aggregate

September 18, 2013
19:00

Chiapas	3–0	Atlante
Ortiz 46'; Villaluz 59'; Zúñiga 87'	Report

Estadio Víctor Manuel Reyna, Tuxtla Gutiérrez, Chiapas
Attendance: 2,329
Referee: Erick Miranda
September 21, 2013
21:00

Atlante	2–1	Chiapas
Hernández 2'; Fonseca 42'	Report	Rincón 55'

Estadio Andrés Quintana Roo, Cancún, Quintana Roo
Referee: Miguel Ángel Chacón

Chiapas won the round 4–2 on aggregate

=== Group 4 ===
Pos	Team	Pld	W	D	L	RW	GF	GA	GD	Pts	
1	Oaxaca	6	4	2	0	3	11	4	+7	17	Group winner
2	Pachuca	6	2	2	2	2	9	8	+1	10	
3	Veracruz	6	2	1	3	1	9	9	0	8	
4	BUAP	6	1	1	4	0	4	12	−8	4	

Updated to match(es) played on unknown. Source:
July 23, 2013
19:00

Pachuca	1–0	BUAP
García 42'	Report

Estadio Hidalgo, Pachuca, Hidalgo
Attendance: 8,923
Referee: Roberto Ríos Jácome
August 6, 2013
19:00

BUAP	0–0	Pachuca
	Report

Estadio Olímpico, Puebla, Puebla
Referee: Baruch Absalón Castellanos

Pachuca won the round 1–0 on aggregate

July 23, 2013
19:00

Veracruz	0–0	Oaxaca
	Report

Estadio Luis de la Fuente, Veracruz, Veracruz
Referee: Antony Zanjuampa
August 7, 2013
19:00

Oaxaca	1–0	Veracruz
Maldonado 9'	Report

Estadio Benito Juárez, Oaxaca, Oaxaca
Attendance: Diego Montaño

Oaxaca won the round 1–0 on aggregate

August 21, 2013
19:00

Veracruz	4–1	BUAP
Tejada 14', 33' (pen.); Cárdenas 38'; Sánchez 81'	Report	Delgadillo 16' (pen.)

Estadio Luis de la Fuente, Veracruz, Veracruz
Attendance: 1,953
Referee: Luis Enrique Santander
August 27, 2013
21:00

BUAP	2–1	Veracruz
Nieves 61', 82'	Report	Murguía 70'

Estadio Olímpico, Puebla, Puebla
Attendance: 1,314
Referee: Uriel Olvera Ríos

Veracruz won the round 5–3 on aggregate

August 21, 2013
19:00

Oaxaca	1–1	Pachuca
Cuellar 36' (pen.)	Report	Morales 14'

Estadio Benito Juárez, Oaxaca, Oaxaca
Attendance: 10,243
Referee: Jonathan Hernández
August 27, 2013
19:00

Pachuca	2–3	Oaxaca
Cavenaghi 29'; Pérez 60'	Report	Godínez 10'; Medina 74'; Moreno 87'

Estadio Hidalgo, Pachuca, Hidalgo
Attendance: 4,247
Referee: Jorge Isaac Rojas

Oaxaca won the round 4–3 on aggregate

September 17, 2013
21:00

Oaxaca	1–0	BUAP
Pineda 62'	Report

Estadio Benito Juárez, Oaxaca, Oaxaca
Attendance: 7,246
Referee: Mario Alcántara
September 24, 2013
19:00

BUAP	1–5	Oaxaca
Delgadillo 32'	Report	Ramírez 11'; Padilla 47', 56'; Mercado 49'; Granados 65'

Estadio Olímpico, Puebla, Puebla
Referee: Quetzalli Alvarado Godínez

Oaxaca won the round 6–1 on aggregate

September 18, 2013
19:00

Pachuca	4–0	Veracruz
Arce 34', 46'; Carreño 72'; Bueno 80'	Report

Estadio Hidalgo, Pachuca, Hidalgo
Attendance: 14,330
Referee: Antony Zanjuampa
September 25, 2013
21:00

Veracruz	4–1	Pachuca
Borja 12'; J. Sánchez 20'; L. Sánchez 64'; Tejada 86'	Report	Arce 27' (pen.)

Estadio Luis de la Fuente, Veracruz, Veracruz
Referee: Víctor Bisguerra Mendiola

Pachuca won the round 5–4 on aggregate

=== Group 5 ===
Pos	Team	Pld	W	D	L	RW	GF	GA	GD	Pts	
1	UNAM	6	3	3	0	2	12	2	+10	14	Group winner
2	Querétaro	6	3	2	1	2	5	3	+2	13	
3	U. de G.	6	1	4	1	2	4	5	−1	9	
4	San Luis	6	0	1	5	0	3	14	−11	1	

Updated to match(es) played on unknown. Source:
July 23, 2013
21:00

San Luis	0–1	Querétaro
	Report	Corona 90+1'

Estadio Alfonso Lastras, San Luis Potosí, San Luis Potosí
Attendance: 8,454
Referee: Jesús Bisguerra Mendiola
August 6, 2013
19:00

Querétaro	2–0	San Luis
Romo 55'; Echavarría 80'	Report

Estadio Corregidora, Querétaro, Querétaro
Attendance: 10,500
Referee: Miguel Ángel Chacón

Querétaro won the round 3–0 on aggregate

July 24, 2013
21:00

U. de G.	0–0	UNAM
	Report

Estadio Jalisco, Guadalajara, Jalisco
Attendance: 4,385
Referee: Mario Alcántara
August 6, 2013
21:00

UNAM	1–1	U. de G.
C. Ramírez 53'	Report	Follé 77'

Estadio Olímpico Universitario, Coyoacán, Mexico City
Attendance: 6,095
Referee: Oscar Macías Romo

U. de G. won the round on away goals

August 20, 2013
19:00

Querétaro	0–0	U. de G.
	Report

Estadio Corregidora, Querétaro, Querétaro
Attendance: 9,537
Referee: Miguel Ayala
August 27, 2013
21:00

U. de G.	0–2	Querétaro
	Report	Romo 63'; Escoto 88'

Estadio Jalisco, Guadalajara, Jalisco
Referee: Marco Ortiz

Querétaro won the round 2–0 on aggregate

August 21, 2013
21:00

San Luis	1–4	UNAM
Guajardo 90+3'	Report	R. Ramírez 7'; Quintana 45'; Nieto 80'; Nahuelpan 83'

Estadio Alfonso Lastras, San Luis Potosí, San Luis Potosí
Attendance: 11,500
Referee: Mauricio Martínez
August 27, 2013
21:00

UNAM	4–0	San Luis
Nahuelpan 5'; Bravo 22', 34'; C. Ramírez 83'	Report

Estadio Olímpico Universitario, Coyoacán, Mexico City
Attendance: 4,771
Referee: Francisco Chacón

UNAM won the round 8–1 on aggregate

September 17, 2013
19:00

San Luis	0–1	U. de G.
	Report	Rodríguez 66'

Estadio Alfonso Lastras, San Luis Potosí, San Luis Potosí
Attendance: 1,430
Referee: Jorge Luis Delgado
September 24, 2013
21:00

U. de G.	2–2	San Luis
Vázquez 49'; Robles 90'	Report	Bautista 19'; Metlich 62'

Estadio Jalisco, Guadalajara, Jalisco
Attendance: 915
Referee: Diego Montaño Robles

U. de G. won the round 3–2 on aggregate

September 18, 2013
21:00

Querétaro	0–0	UNAM
	Report

Estadio Corregidora, Querétaro, Querétaro
Attendance: 21,707
Referee: Roberto Ríos Jácome
September 24, 2013
21:00

UNAM	3–0	Querétaro
Cortés 16'; Nahuelpan 65'; Van Rankin 79'	Report

Estadio Olímpico Universitario, Coyoacán, Mexico City
Attendance: 2,929
Referee: Jesús Morales

UNAM won the round 3–0 on aggregate

=== Group 6 ===
Pos	Team	Pld	W	D	L	RW	GF	GA	GD	Pts	
1	León	6	3	3	0	2	7	2	+5	14	Group winner
2	Guadalajara	6	3	3	0	2	9	6	+3	14	
3	Sinaloa	6	2	1	3	1	6	8	−2	8	
4	Necaxa	6	0	1	5	0	1	7	−6	1	

Updated to match(es) played on unknown. Source:
July 23, 2013
19:00

Necaxa	1–2	Guadalajara
Lillingston 84'	Report	Araujo 61'; G. Hernández 74'

Estadio Victoria, Aguascalientes, Aguascalientes
Referee: Quetzalli Alvarado Godínez
August 7, 2013
19:00

Guadalajara	0–0	Necaxa
	Report

Estadio Omnilife, Zapopan, Jalisco
Attendance: 10,762
Referee: Luis Enrique Santander

Guadalajara won the round 2–1 on aggregate

July 24, 2013
19:00

León	3–0	Sinaloa
Boselli 4', 23'; Flores 8'	Report

Estadio León, León, Guanajuato
Attendance: 20,190
Referee: Ricardo Arellano
August 7, 2013
20:00

Sinaloa	0–0	León
	Report

Estadio Banorte, Culiacán, Sinaloa
Attendance: 5,360
Referee: Marco Antonio Ortiz Nava

León won the round 3–0 on aggregate

August 20, 2013
19:00

León	1–0	Necaxa
Caldreón 49'	Report

Estadio León, León, Guanajuato
Attendance: 24,010
Referee: Miguel Ángel Chacón
August 27, 2013
21:00

Necaxa	0–1	León
	Report	Jacson 80'

Estadio Victoria, Aguascalientes, Aguascalientes
Attendance: 6,421
Referee: Obed Eliud Gómez Barreras

León won the round 2–0 on aggregate

August 20, 2013
20:00

Sinaloa	2–3	Guadalajara
Padilla 70' (pen.); Salas 90'	Report	Márquez 66'; Sabah 75', 84' (pen.)

Estadio Banorte, Culiacán, Sinaloa
Referee: Eduardo Galván
August 28, 2013
19:00

Guadalajara	2–1	Sinaloa
Fabián 52'; Fierro 71'	Report	López 90'

Estadio Omnilife, Zapopan, Jalisco
Attendance: 5,498
Referee: Víctor Bisguerra Mendiola

Guadalajara won the round 5–3 on aggregate

September 17, 2013
19:00

Necaxa	0–1	Sinaloa
	Report	Hernández 38'

Estadio Victoria, Aguascalientes, Aguascalientes
Attendance: 3,085
Referee: Mauricio Martínez Figueroa
September 25, 2013
18:00

Sinaloa	2–0	Necaxa
Quiroz 11'; Padilla 60' (pen.)	Report

Estadio Banorte, Culiacán, Sinaloa
Referee: Jorge Adán Tonix

Sinaloa won the round 3–0 on aggregate

September 18, 2013
21:00

León	1–1	Guadalajara
Castañeda 86'	Report	Vidrio 79'

Estadio León, León, Guanajuato
Attendance: 24,718
Referee: Jesús Fabricio Morales
September 25, 2013
21:00

Guadalajara	1–1	León
Márquez 70' (pen.)	Report	Rocha 44'

Estadio Omnilife, Zapopan, Jalisco
Attendance: 13,307
Referee: Ricardo Arellano

Guadalajara and León drew 1–1 on aggregate and both tied on away goals, thus neither team received the extra point

=== Group 7 ===
Pos	Team	Pld	W	D	L	RW	GF	GA	GD	Pts	
1	Morelia	6	4	1	1	2	12	2	+10	15	Group winner
2	Atlas	6	3	3	0	3	10	6	+4	15	Best runner-up
3	Estudiantes Tecos	6	1	1	4	1	9	13	−4	5	
4	Celaya	6	1	1	4	0	5	14	−9	4	

Updated to match(es) played on unknown. Source:
July 23, 2013
19:00

Celaya	0−3	Morelia
	Report	Govea 49'; Guzmán 75'; Zamorano 77'

Estadio Miguel Alemán, Celaya, Guanajuato
Referee: Diego Montaño Robles
August 7, 2013
21:00

Morelia	1−0	Celaya
Tréllez 66'	Report

Estadio Morelos, Morelia, Michoacán
Attendance: 8,023
Referee: Roberto Ríos Jácome

Morelia won the round 4−0 on aggregate

July 23, 2013
21:00

Atlas	1−1	Estudiantes Tecos
Barraza 65'	Report	Gallardo 19'

Estadio Jalisco, Guadalajara, Jalisco
Referee: Miguel Ayala
August 6, 2013
21:00

Estudiantes Tecos	2−3	Atlas
Cortés 59'; Rangel 61'	Report	Nava 5'; Barragán 49'; González 68'

Estadio Tres de Marzo, Zapopan, Jalisco
Attendance: 3,215
Referee: Emerson Zamora

Atlas won the round 4−3 on aggregate

August 20, 2013
21:00

Estudiantes Tecos	0−3	Morelia
	Report	Morales 55'; Tréllez 71'; Zamorano 74'

Estadio Tres de Marzo, Zapopan, Jalisco
Attendance: 2,504
Referee: Jesús Bisguerra Mendiola
August 27, 2013
21:00

Morelia	4−0	Estudiantes Tecos
Silva 49'; Castillo 53'; Arroyo 75'; Guzman 82'	Report

Estadio Morelos, Morelia, Michoacán
Attendance: 3,434
Referee: Luis Enrique Santander

Morelia won the round 7−0 on aggregate

August 21, 2013
21:00

Atlas	3−1	Celaya
Barraza 5'; Rivera 26'; Ramos 80'	Report	Leandro Carrijó 52'

Estadio Jalisco, Guadalajara, Jalisco
Attendance: 4,484
Referee: Antony Zanjuampa
August 28, 2013
21:00

Celaya	1−1	Atlas
Trillo 33'	Report	Barraza 79'

Estadio Miguel Alemán, Celaya, Guanajuato
Attendance: 4,617
Referee: Jorge Luis Delgado

Atlas won the round 4−2 on aggregate

September 17, 2013
19:00

Estudiantes Tecos	6−1	Celaya
Cortés 9'; Sánchez 12'; Cuevas 21'; Landín 26'; Carando 77'; Argüelles 90'	Report	Aparicio 83'

Estadio Tres de Marzo, Zapopan, Jalisco
Referee: Óscar Villagómez
September 25, 2013
21:00

Celaya	1−0	Estudiantes Tecos
Barroche 44'	Report

Estadio Miguel Alemán, Celaya, Guanajuato
Referee: Uriel Olvera

Estudiantes Tecos won the round 6−2 on aggregate

September 17, 2013
21:00

Atlas	1−1	Morelia
Barraza 11'	Report	Morales 63' (pen.)

Estadio Jalisco, Guadalajara, Jalisco
Attendance: 4,177
Referee: Miguel Ayala
September 24, 2013
21:00

Morelia	0−1	Atlas
	Report	Arellano 71' (o.g.)

Estadio Morelos, Morelia, Michoacán
Attendance: 5,907
Referee: José Alfredo Peñaloza

Atlas won the round 2−1 on aggregate

=== Ranking of runners-up clubs ===
The best runner-up advances to the Championship Stage. If two or more teams are equal on points on completion of the group matches, the following criteria are applied to determine the rankings:

1. superior goal difference;
2. higher number of goals scored;
3. higher number of goals scored away;
4. best position in the Relegation table;
5. fair play ranking;
6. drawing of lots.

Pos	Grp	Team	Pld	W	D	L	RW	GF	GA	GD	Pts	
1	7	Atlas	6	3	3	0	3	10	6	+4	15	Best runner-up
2	6	Guadalajara	6	3	3	0	2	9	6	+3	14	
3	5	Querétaro	6	3	2	1	2	5	3	+2	13	
4	1	UAT	6	2	3	1	2	8	9	−1	11	
5	3	Chiapas	6	2	2	2	2	9	4	+5	10	
6	2	Santos Laguna	6	2	3	1	1	9	8	+1	10	
7	4	Pachuca	6	2	2	2	2	9	8	+1	10	

Updated to match(es) played on unknown. Source:
- Santos Laguna has a higher number of goals scored away in the group matches. (Santos Laguna 3, Pachuca 2)

== Championship Stage ==
The eight clubs that advance to this stage will be ranked and seeded 1 to 8. In case of ties, the same tiebreakers used to rank the runners-up will be used.

In this stage, all the rounds will be one-off game. If the game ends in a tie, there will proceed to penalty shootouts directly.

The venue will be determined as follows:

- The highest seeded club will host the match, regardless of the division the clubs are in.

=== Seeding ===
The qualified teams were seeded 1–8 in the championship stage according to their results in the group stage.

Seed	Team	Pld	W	D	L	RW	GF	GA	GD	Pts
1	Oaxaca	6	4	2	0	3	11	4	+7	17
2	Monterrey	6	4	2	0	3	11	4	+7	17
3	Morelia	6	4	1	1	2	12	2	+10	15
4	Atlas	6	3	3	0	3	10	6	+4	15
5	UNAM	6	3	3	0	2	12	2	+10	14
6	León	6	3	3	0	2	7	2	+5	14
7	UANL	6	3	1	2	2	9	5	+4	12
8	Mérida	6	3	1	2	2	10	8	+2	12

Updated to match(es) played on unknown. Source:
- Oaxaca has a higher number of goals scored away in the group matches. (Oaxaca 8, Monterrey 4)

=== Bracket ===
The bracket of the championship stage was determined by the seeding as follows:

- Quarterfinals: Seed 1 vs. Seed 8 (QF1), Seed 2 vs. Seed 7 (QF2), Seed 3 vs. Seed 6 (QF3), Seed 4 vs. Seed 5 (QF4), with seeds 1–4 hosting the match
- Semifinals: Winner QF1 vs. Winner QF3 (SF1), Winner QF2 vs. Winner QF4 (SF2), with the higher seed hosting the match
- Finals: Winner SF1 vs. Winner SF2, with the highest seed hosting the match

Quarterfinals
1	Oaxaca	2
8	Mérida	1
4	Atlas	2
5	UNAM	1
2	Monterrey	2 (4)
7	UANL	2 (2)
3	Morelia	2
6	León	0

Semifinals
1	Oaxaca	1 (4)
4	Atlas	1 (5)
2	Monterrey	0
3	Morelia	3

Final
4	Atlas	3(1)
3	Morelia	3(3)

=== Quarterfinals ===
October 1, 2013
19:00

Oaxaca	2−1	Mérida
Moreno 42'; Ramírez 46'	Report	Martín 1'

Estadio Benito Juárez, Oaxaca, Oaxaca
Attendance: 6,640
Referee: Obed Gómez

October 1, 2013
21:00

Morelia	2−0	León
Ramírez 50'; Pérez 85'	Report

Estadio Morelos, Morelia, Michoacán
Referee: Oscar Macías Romo

October 2, 2013
19:00

Atlas	2−1	UNAM
Barraza 13', 87'	Report	Nahuelpan 90+3'

Estadio Jalisco, Guadalajara, Jalisco
Attendance: 9,099
Referee: Luis Enrique Santander

October 2, 2013
21:00

Monterrey	2−2	UANL
Delgado 65'; Madrigal 90+2'	Report	Villa 36'; Juninho 45+1' (pen.)
Penalties
Suazo (penalty scored); Madrigal (penalty scored); López (penalty scored); Juárez (penalty scored)	4−2	(penalty missed) Torres Mezzell; (penalty scored) Dueñas; (penalty scored) Rivas; (penalty missed) Viniegra

Estadio Tecnológico, Monterrey, Nuevo León
Attendance: 28,867
Referee: Fernando Guerrero

=== Semifinals ===
October 22, 2013
21:00

Monterrey	0–3	Morelia
	Report	Mancilla 40', 68'; Morales 78' (pen.)

Estadio Tecnológico, Monterrey, Nuevo León
Attendance: 16,151
Referee: César Ramos

October 23, 2013
20:00

Oaxaca	1–1	Atlas
Ramírez 34'	Report	Santos 47'
Penalties
Torres (penalty scored); Madrigal (penalty scored); Ramírez (penalty scored); Medina (penalty missed); Alfaro (penalty scored)	4−5	(penalty scored) Bravo; (penalty scored) Torres; (penalty scored) Barraza; (penalty scored) Ponce; (penalty scored) Ayala

Estadio Benito Juárez, Oaxaca, Oaxaca
Attendance: 8,112
Referee: Eduardo Galván

=== Final ===
November 5, 2013
21:00

Morelia	3−3	Atlas
Montero 6'; Andrade 12'; Mancilla 53'	Report	Bravo 39' (pen.); Vuoso 51'; Ayala 57'
Penalties
Mancilla (penalty scored); Vilar (penalty scored); Zamorano (penalty scored)	3−1	(penalty missed) Vuoso; (penalty scored) Santos; (penalty missed) Cufré; (penalty missed) Ayala

Estadio Morelos, Morelia, Michoacán
Attendance: 31,830
Referee: Fernando Guerrero

Apertura 2013 Copa MX winners:

1st title

== Top goalscorers ==
Rank	Player	Club	Goals
1
1	(Mexico) Jahir Barraza	Atlas	6
2
2	(Mexico) Guillermo Madrigal	Monterrey	5
2	(Colombia) Carlos Quintero	Santos Laguna	5
4
4	(Mexico) Henry Martín	Mérida	4
4	(Argentina) Ariel Nahuelpan	UNAM	4
6
6	(Mexico) Othoniel Arce	Pachuca	3
6	(Chile) Héctor Mancilla	Morelia	3
6	(Mexico) Carlos Adrián Morales	Morelia	3
6	(Paraguay) Gustavo Ramírez	Oaxaca	3
6	(Panama) Luis Tejada	Veracruz	3
6	(Mexico) Michel Vázquez	Delfines	3

Source: LigaMX.net
