= Apertura 2013 Copa MX final =

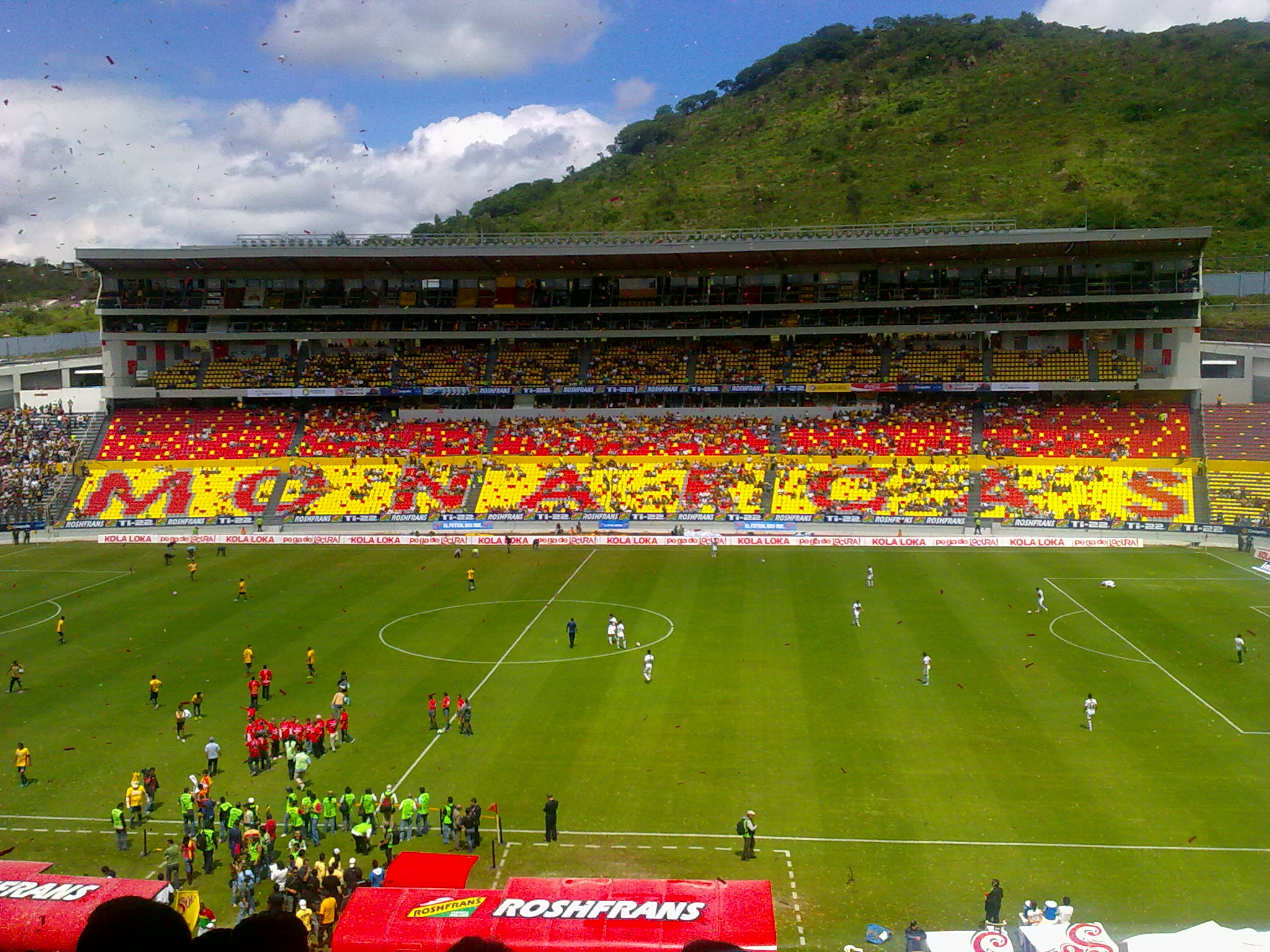
- Estadio Morelos, host of the final
- Event: Apertura 2013 Copa MX
Morelia	Atlas
3	3
- Morelia won 3–1 on penalties
- Date: November 5, 2013
- Venue: Estadio Morelos, Morelia, Michoacán
- Referee: Fernando Guerrero
- Attendance: 31,830
- Weather: Partly Cloudy; 65 °F (18 °C); 69% humidity

The Apertura 2013 Copa MX final was the final of the Apertura 2013 Copa MX the third edition of the Copa MX under its current format and 70th overall organized by the Mexican Football Federation, the governing body of association football in Mexico.

The final is contested in a single leg format between two Liga MX clubs, Morelia and Atlas both from group 7. The leg was hosted by Morelia at Estadio Morelos in Morelia, Michoacán on November 5, 2013. The winner earned a spot to face the winner of the Clausura 2014 Copa MX in a playoff to qualify as Mexico 3 to the 2015 Copa Libertadores.

== Venue ==
Due to the tournament's regulations the higher seed among both finalists during the group stage would host the final, thus Estadio Morelos hosted the final. The home venue of Morelia since 1989, it staged four Liga MX finals, one CONCACAF Champions Cup final as well as eight matches of the 2011 FIFA U-17 World Cup.

== Background ==
Atlas, who is a four-time winner last won the tournament back in 1968 while Morelia who have never won the tournament were runners-up back in 1965. For the first time since 1999 Atlas found themselves in final of any kind, the first since losing 5–4 in penalties to the José Cardozo led Toluca in the Verano 1999 league final. This was Morelia's first final of any kind since losing 3–2 on aggregate to UNAM in the Clausura 2011 league final. Atlas last championship of any kind came back in 1968 when they defeated Veracruz to win the 1967–68 Copa Mexico. Morelia's last championship was in 2010 when they defeated Major League Soccer club New England Revolution 2–1 with two goals by Miguel Sabah to capture the 2010 North American SuperLiga, .

Morelia won their first four group stage matches but drew and lost both of its last two matches to Atlas, as they were seeded third, they eliminated León in the quarterfinals and Monterrey in the semi-finals.

Atlas who were the best runners-up during group stage ended with 15 points, the same as final rival Morelia but Morelia had a higher goal differential. Atlas defeated UNAM in the quarterfinals and Ascenso MX club Oaxaca in penalties in the semifinals.

== Road to the finals ==
Note: In all results below, the score of the finalist is given first.

Morelia		Round	Atlas	
Opponent	Result	Group stage	Opponent	Result
Celaya	3–0 (A)	Matchday 1	Estudiantes Tecos	1–1 (H)
Celaya	1–0 (H)	Matchday 2	Estudiantes Tecos	3–2 (A)
Estudiantes Tecos	3–0 (A)	Matchday 3	Celaya	3–1 (H)
Estudiantes Tecos	4–0 (H)	Matchday 4	Celaya	1–1 (A)
Atlas	1–1 (A)	Matchday 5	Morelia	1–1 (H)
Atlas	0–1 (H)	Matchday 6	Morelia	1–0 (A)
Group 7 winner: Pos / Team / Pld / Pts; 1 / Morelia / 6 / 15; 2 / Atlas / 6 / 15; 3 / Estudiantes Tecos / 6 / 5; 4 / Celaya / 6 / 4; Updated to match(es) played on unknown. Source:		Final standings	Group 7 runners-up: Pos / Team / Pld / Pts; 1 / Morelia / 6 / 15; 2 / Atlas / 6 / 15; 3 / Estudiantes Tecos / 6 / 5; 4 / Celaya / 6 / 4; Updated to match(es) played on unknown. Source:	
Opponent	Result	Knockout stage	Opponent	Result
León	2–0 (H)	Quarterfinals	UNAM	2–1 (H)
Monterrey	3–0 (A)	Semifinals	Oaxaca	1–1 (5–4) (A)

== Match ==
5 November 2013
21:00

Morelia	3−3	Atlas
Montero 6'; Andrade 12'; Mancilla 53'	Report	Bravo 39' (pen.); Vuoso 51'; Ayala 57'
Penalties
Mancilla (penalty scored); Vilar (penalty scored); Zamorano (penalty scored)	3−1	(penalty missed) Vuoso; (penalty scored) Santos; (penalty missed) Cufré; (penalty missed) Ayala

Estadio Morelos, Morelia, Michoacán
Attendance: 31,830
Referee: Fernando Guerrero

Morelia	Atlas

GK	3	(Argentina) Federico Vilar (c)
DF	6	(Mexico) Joel Huiqui
DF	2	(Mexico) Enrique Pérez
DF	24	(Mexico) Rodrigo Godínez	(yellow card) 44'	(substituted off) 84'
DF	7	(Mexico) José María Cárdenas		(substituted off) 60'
MF	26	(Mexico) Christian Valdez
MF	28	(Mexico) Carlos Adrián Morales	(red card) 38'
MF	11	(Mexico) Edgar Andrade		(substituted off) 42'
MF	8	(Colombia) Aldo Leão Ramírez
FW	9	(Chile) Héctor Mancilla
FW	10	(Ecuador) Jefferson Montero
Substitutions:
GK	1	(Mexico) Carlos Felipe Rodríguez
DF	15	(Mexico) Juan Carlos Arellano
DF	19	(Mexico) José Antonio Olvera		(substituted on) 42'
MF	17	(Mexico) Hibert Ruiz		(substituted on) 60'
MF	22	(Mexico) Armando Zamorano		(substituted on) 84'
FW	14	(Mexico) Ever Guzmán
FW	20	(Colombia) Santiago Tréllez
Manager:
(Argentina) Carlos Bustos

GK	1	(Chile) Miguel Pinto (c)
DF	5	(Argentina) Facundo Erpen
DF	13	(Mexico) Gregorio Torres		(substituted off) 46'
DF	16	(Mexico) Sergio Amaury Ponce	(yellow card) 29'	(substituted off) 46'
DF	2	(Mexico) Francisco Giovanni León
MF	8	(Mexico) Lucas Ayala
MF	10	(Bolivia) José Luis Chávez		(substituted off) 68'
MF	11	(Mexico) Édson Rivera
FW	9	(Mexico) Omar Bravo	(yellow card) 29' (yellow-red card) 45'
FW	30	(Mexico) Vicente Matías Vuoso
FW	26	(Mexico) Flavio Santos
Substitutions:
GK	21	(Mexico) Alan López
DF	25	(Argentina) Leandro Cufré	(yellow card) 52'	(substituted on) 46'
MF	20	(Chile) Rodrigo Millar
MF	22	(Mexico) Juan Pablo Vigón		(substituted on) 68'
MF	106	(Mexico) Daniel Cisneros	(yellow card) 77'	(substituted on) 46'
FW	17	(Mexico) Jahir Barraza
FW	45	(Mexico) Carlos Nava
Manager:
(Mexico) José Luis Mata

Assistant referees:
Juan Joel Rangel
Juan Carlos Salinas
Fourth official:
Oscar Macías
