= Jorge Zárate =

Jorge Zárate may refer to:

- Jorge Zárate (footballer)
- Jorge Zárate (actor)
