= Jorge Aparicio =

Jorge Aparicio may refer to:

- Jorge Aparicio (Mexican footballer) (born 1989), Mexican football midfielder
- Jorge Aparicio (Guatemalan footballer) (born 1992), Guatemalan football midfielder
