= Antonio Olvera =

Mexican footballern (born 1986)

Personal information
- Full name: José Antonio Olvera de los Santos
- Date of birth: March 4, 1986 (age 40)
- Place of birth: Torreon, Coahuila, Mexico
- Height: 1.73 m (5 ft 8 in)
- Position: Defender

Senior career*
Years	Team	Apps	(Gls)
2004–2005	Santos Laguna	54	(2)
2007–2012	Guadalajara	16	(1)
2009	→ Toluca (loan)	5	(0)
2010	→ Santos Laguna (loan)	35	(0)
2011–2012	Santos Laguna	14	(0)
2012–2016	Morelia	61	(0)
2016–2019	Tampico Madero	59	(0)

International career
2005–2006	Mexico	3	(0)
- * Club domestic league appearances and goals

Jose Antonio Olvera de los Santos (born March 4, 1986) is a Mexican former footballer. He played in the Liga MX as a defender or midfielder, and made three appearances for Mexico in international matches.

Olvera is known for his left foot and also because he played for Santos Laguna from 2004 to 2006. He moved to Chivas starting the 2007 season. Olvera had already played as a loan from Santos to Chivas de Guadalajara in the Copa Libertadores in 2006 where Chivas reached semi-finals losing against São Paulo FC. He has also been capped in the cycle of Ricardo LaVolpe with Mexico three times debuting against Hungary. On July 24, 2007, he made his first appearance with Chivas in the superliga where they faced FC Dallas and he scored a goal.

On December 19, 2008, it was announced that Olvera would go on loan to Toluca. In December 2009, it was announced that Olvera would go back to Santos Laguna. In December 2010 his loan to Santos Laguna ended and he moved there permanently, signing a three-year contract.

He was born in the old Estadio Corona, home of the Santos Laguna; by that time his mother worked in maintenance of the stadium when the delivery took place.

== Honours ==
Morelia

- Copa MX (1): Apertura 2013
- Supercopa MX (1): 2014

== International appearances ==
As of 15 February 2006

International appearances
#	Date	Venue	Opponent	Result	Competition
1.	14 December 2005	Chase Field, Phoenix, United States	Hungary	2–0	Friendly
2.	25 January 2006	Monster Park, San Francisco, United States	Norway	2–1	Friendly
3.	15 February 2006	Los Angeles Memorial Coliseum, Los Angeles, United States	South Korea	0–1	Friendly
