= Duvier Riascos =

Colombian footballer (born 1986)

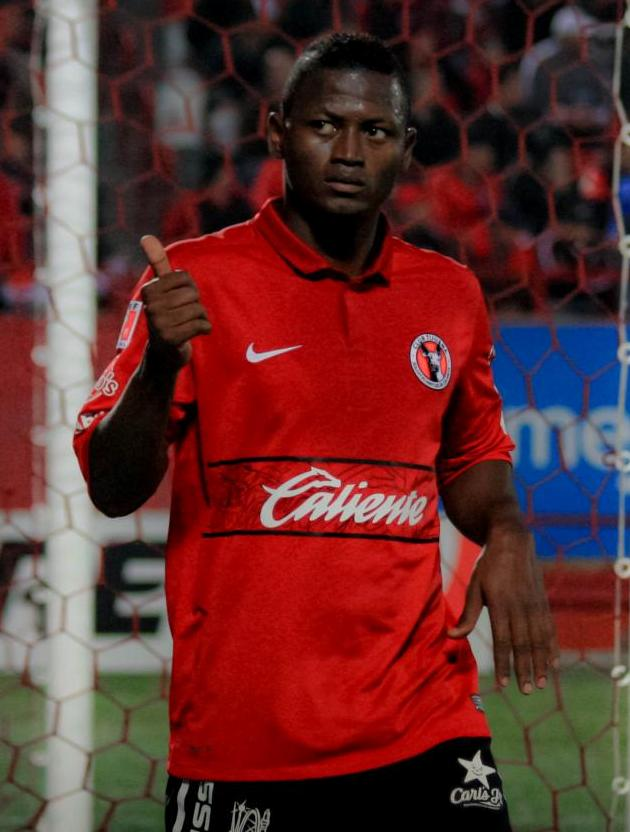
- Riascos playing for Tijuana in 2012

Personal information
- Full name: Duvier Orlando Riascos Barahona
- Date of birth: 26 June 1986 (age 40)
- Place of birth: Buenaventura, Colombia
- Height: 1.81 m (5 ft 11 in)
- Position: Forward

Youth career
- América de Cali

Senior career*
Years	Team	Apps	(Gls)
2005–2011	América de Cali	18	(4)
2006	→ Real Cartagena (loan)	15	(2)
2008–2009	→ Estudiantes de Mérida (loan)	37	(15)
2009	→ Deportivo Cali (loan)	16	(3)
2010–2011	→ Shanghai Shenhua (loan)	39	(24)
2011	América	0	(0)
2011	→ Puebla (loan)	16	(6)
2012–2013	Tijuana	54	(20)
2013	Pachuca	17	(2)
2014	Morelia	30	(4)
2015–2016	Cruzeiro	12	(1)
2015–2016	→ Vasco da Gama (loan)	27	(5)
2017	Millonarios	38	(0)
2018	Vasco da Gama	6	(0)
2018	Dalian Yifang	9	(3)
2019–2020	Universidad Católica	9	(3)
2020	Always Ready	3	(0)
2021	Alianza FC	25	(20)
2022	Deportivo Pasto	15	(8)
2023	Comunicaciones	0	(0)
- * Club domestic league appearances and goals as of 20:34, 10 January 2022 (UTC)

Duvier Riascos (Spanish pronunciation: [ˈduβjeɾ ˈrjaskos]; born 26 June 1986) is a Colombian professional footballer who plays as a forward. He is known as the "Snake" mainly due to his celebration when he scores.

== Career ==
=== Shanghai Shenhua ===
On 1 February 2010, it was announced that Riascos joined Shanghai Shenhua on loan from América de Cali. Riascos made his Chinese Super League debut on 27 March, in a 0–2 away loss to Changsha Ginde. He scored his first goal for Shanghai on his second appearance, in a 2–1 away win over Nanchang Bayi on 3 April. Riascos won the Golden Boot Award after scoring 20 goals in 28 appearances in the 2010 Chinese Super League season.

=== Puebla ===
Duvier was sent out on loan to Mexican Primera División club Puebla on 8 July 2011. Riascos made his debut for Puebla on 23 July 2011 against Atlas coming in as a sub in the second half playing only 22 minutes. Riascos scored his first goal as a starter in minute 21 winning 2–0 in the first half before Pachuca tied the game 2–2. Riascos ended his first season well with 6 goals in 16 games before he was sold to Tijuana.

=== Cruzeiro ===
On 16 January 2015 Riascos was signed by Cruzeiro on a three-year contract.

=== Dalian Yifang ===
On 21 June 2018, Riascos signed with Dalian Yifang for one and a half year on a free transfer from Vasco Da Gama. His physical condition was not at his best throughout the season and received many criticism, but he scored a critical header to save Dalian Yifang from relegation in the last league match.

=== Universidad Católica ===
On 28 February 2019, Chilean Primera División club Universidad Católica announced the signing Riascos on a one-year loan contract.

== Career statistics ==
As of 31 December 2019

Appearances and goals by club, season and competition
Club	Season	League			National cup		Continental		Other		Total	
Club	Season	Division	Apps	Goals	Apps	Goals	Apps	Goals	Apps	Goals	Apps	Goals
América de Cali	2005	Categoría Primera A	5	1	0	0	–		–		5	1
América de Cali	2007	Categoría Primera A	13	3	0	0	–		–		13	3
América de Cali	Total		18	4	0	0	0	0	0	0	18	4
Real Cartagena (loan)	2006	Categoría Primera A	15	2	0	0	–		–		15	2
Estudiantes de Mérida (loan)	2007–08	Venezuelan Primera División	16	3	0	0	–		–		16	3
Estudiantes de Mérida (loan)	2008–09	Venezuelan Primera División	21	12	7	5	–		–		28	17
Estudiantes de Mérida (loan)	Total		37	15	7	5	0	0	0	0	44	20
Deportivo Cali (loan)	2009	Categoría Primera A	16	3	0	0	2	0	–		18	3
Shanghái Shenhua (loan)	2010	Chinese Super League	28	20	–		–		–		28	20
Shanghái Shenhua (loan)	2011	Chinese Super League	11	4	0	0	5	1	–		16	5
Shanghái Shenhua (loan)	Total		39	24	0	0	5	1	0	0	44	25
Puebla (loan)	2011–12	Liga MX	16	6	0	0	0	0	–		16	6
Tijuana	2011–12	Liga MX	18	5	0	0	0	0	–		18	5
Tijuana	2012–13	Liga MX	36	15	2	0	9	3	–		47	18
Tijuana	Total		54	20	2	0	9	3	0	0	65	23
Pachuca	2013–14	Liga MX	17	2	1	0	0	0	–		18	2
Monarcas Morelia	2013–14	Liga MX	17	3	1	0	2	0	2 (Note: Appearances in Supercopa MX)	0	22	3
Monarcas Morelia	2014–15	Liga MX	13	1	0	0	0	0	–		13	1
Monarcas Morelia	Total		30	4	1	0	2	0	2	0	35	4
Cruzeiro	2015	Série A	1	0	0	0	1	0	2 (Note: Appearances in Campeonato Mineiro)	0	4	0
Cruzeiro	2016	Série A	11	1	0	0	0	0	0	0	11	1
Cruzeiro	Total		12	1	0	0	1	0	2	0	15	1
Vasco de Gama (loan)	2015	Série A	26	4	6	3	0	0	0 (Note: Appearances in Campeonato Carioca)	0	32	7
Vasco de Gama (loan)	2016	Série B	1	1	3	0	0	0	13	9	17	10
Vasco de Gama (loan)	Total		27	5	9	3	0	0	13	9	49	17
Millonarios	2017	Categoría Primera A	38	10	3	1	0	0	–		41	11
Vasco de Gama	2018	Série A	6	0	0	0	9	0	11	3	26	3
Dalian Yifang	2018	Chinese Super League	9	3	2	0	–		–		11	3
Universidad Católica	2019	Primera División	9	3	4	0	7	1	–		20	4
Career total			343	102	29	9	35	5	28	12	435	128

== Honours ==
Tijuana

- Liga MX: Apertura 2012

Morelia

- Supercopa MX: 2014

Vasco da Gama

- Campeonato Carioca: 2016

Millonarios

- Categoría Primera A: 2017–II

Universidad Católica

- Primera División de Chile (1): 2019
- Supercopa de Chile (1): 2019

Individual

- Copa Venezuela Top Scorer: 2008
- Chinese Football Association Footballer of the Year: 2010
- Chinese Super League Golden Boot Winner: 2010
- Campeonato Carioca Team of the year: 2016
