= 2014 Supercopa MX =

Morelia	UANL
5	4

First leg
Morelia	UANL
4	1
- Date: 9 July
- Venue: Estadio Morelos, Morelia
- Referee: Luis Enrique Santander
- Attendance: 12,687
- Weather: Partly Cloudy; 18 °C (64 °F); 94% humidity

Second leg
UANL	Morelia
3	1
- Date: 12 July
- Venue: Estadio Universitario, San Nicolás de los Garza
- Referee: Fernando Guerrero
- Attendance: 34,430
- Weather: Scattered Clouds; 32 °C (90 °F); 29% humidity

The 2014 Supercopa MX was a two-legged Mexican football match-up which was played in July 2014 between the champion of the Apertura 2013 Copa MX, Monarcas Morelia, and the champion of the Clausura 2014 Copa MX, Tigres UANL. The winner of the 2014 Supercopa MX qualified for the 2015 Copa Libertadores first stage.

== Match details ==
=== First leg ===
9 July 2014
20:00

Morelia	4–1	UANL
Fernández 14'; Zárate 57'; Pereira 67'; Riascos 75'	Report	Burbano 56'

Estadio Morelos, Morelia
Attendance: 12,687
Referee: Luis Enrique Santander

Morelia	UANL

GK	1	(Mexico) Carlos Felipe Rodríguez
DF	6	(Mexico) Joel Huiqui (c)
DF	3	(Mexico) José Antonio Olvera	(yellow card) 63'
DF	2	(Mexico) Ignacio González
DF	24	(Mexico) Rodrigo Godínez
MF	26	(Mexico) Christian Valdez
MF	8	(Uruguay) Hamilton Pereira
MF	13	(Mexico) Jorge Zárate		(substituted off) 82'
MF	22	(Mexico) Armando Zamorano	(yellow card) 88'
FW	20	(Colombia) Duvier Riascos		(substituted off) 76'
FW	31	(Mexico) Oscar Fernández		(substituted off) 89'
Substitutions:
GK	16	(Mexico) Alexandro Álvarez
DF	4	(Mexico) Luis Fernando Silva	(yellow card) 86'	(substituted on) 76'
DF	5	(Mexico) Carlos Guzmán
MF	11	(Mexico) Luis Ángel Morales		(substituted on) 82'
MF	17	(Mexico) Hibert Ruiz
FW	27	(Mexico) Miguel Sansores
FW	20	(Mexico) Víctor Guajardo		(substituted on) 89'
Manager:
(Argentina) Ángel Comizzo

GK	20	(Mexico) Sergio García
DF	3	(Brazil) Juninho (c)	(yellow card) 53'
DF	4	(Mexico) Hugo Ayala
DF	6	(Mexico) Jorge Torres Nilo
DF	14	(Mexico) Jorge Iván Estrada
MF	11	(Mexico) Damián Álvarez
MF	5	(Uruguay) Egidio Arévalo
MF	18	(Argentina) Guido Pizarro		(substituted off) 71'
MF	10	(Colombia) Hernán Burbano
FW	33	(Argentina) Emanuel Villa
FW	9	(Argentina) Marco Ruben
Substitutions:
GK	21	(Mexico) Aarón Fernández
DF	24	(Mexico) José Arturo Rivas
DF	25	(Mexico) Antonio Briseño
MF	18	(United States) José Francisco Torres		(substituted on) 71'
MF	23	(Mexico) Édgar Lugo
MF	98	(Mexico) Ramón García
FW	16	(United States) Herculez Gomez
Manager:
(Brazil) Ricardo Ferretti

Assistant referees:
José Santana Martínez
Christian Kiabek Espinosa
Fourth official:
Miguel Angel Chacón

=== Second leg ===
12 July 2014
19:00

UANL	3–1	Morelia
Burbano 15'; Juninho 63' (pen.), 81'	Report	Riascos 77'

Estadio Universitario, San Nicolás de los Garza
Attendance: 34,430
Referee: Fernando Guerrero

UANL	Morelia

GK	20	(Mexico) Sergio García
DF	3	(Brazil) Juninho (c)
DF	4	(Mexico) Hugo Ayala
DF	6	(Mexico) Jorge Torres Nilo	(yellow card) 67'
DF	14	(Mexico) Jorge Iván Estrada		(substituted off) 80'
MF	11	(Mexico) Damián Álvarez		(substituted off) 35'
MF	5	(Uruguay) Egidio Arévalo
MF	18	(Argentina) Guido Pizarro	(yellow card) 22'
MF	10	(Colombia) Hernán Burbano
FW	33	(Argentina) Emanuel Villa		(substituted off) 69'
FW	9	(Argentina) Marco Ruben
Substitutions:
GK	21	(Mexico) Aarón Fernández
DF	24	(Mexico) José Arturo Rivas
DF	25	(Mexico) Antonio Briseño
MF	18	(United States) José Francisco Torres		(substituted on) 80'
MF	23	(Mexico) Édgar Lugo		(substituted on) 35'
MF	98	(Mexico) Ramón García
FW	16	(United States) Herculez Gomez		(substituted on) 69'
Manager:
(Brazil) Ricardo Ferretti

GK	1	(Mexico) Carlos Felipe Rodríguez
DF	6	(Mexico) Joel Huiqui	(yellow card) 44'
DF	2	(Mexico) Ignacio González		(substituted off) 27'
DF	24	(Mexico) Rodrigo Godínez	(yellow card) 20'
DF	26	(Mexico) Christian Valdez
MF	28	(Mexico) Carlos Adrián Morales (c)	(yellow card) 57'
MF	8	(Uruguay) Hamilton Pereira
MF	13	(Mexico) Jorge Zárate		(substituted off) 65'
MF	22	(Mexico) Armando Zamorano		(substituted off) 87'
FW	20	(Colombia) Duvier Riascos	(yellow card) 36'
FW	31	(Mexico) Oscar Fernández	(yellow card) 55'
Substitutions:
GK	16	(Mexico) Alexandro Álvarez
DF	3	(Mexico) José Antonio Olvera		(substituted on) 87'
DF	4	(Mexico) Luis Fernando Silva
DF	5	(Mexico) Carlos Guzmán		(substituted on) 27'
MF	17	(Mexico) Hibert Ruiz
FW	27	(Mexico) Miguel Sansores
FW	30	(Mexico) Víctor Guajardo		(substituted on) 65'
Manager:
(Argentina) Ángel Comizzo

Assistant referees:
Alberto Morín Méndez
José Alfredo López
Fourth official:
Víctor Bisguerra Mendiola

== See also ==
- Apertura 2013 Copa MX
- Clausura 2014 Copa MX
