= Hamilton Pereira =

Uruguayan footballer (born 1987)

Personal information
- Full name: Hamilton Miguel Pereira Ferrón
- Date of birth: 26 June 1987 (age 39)
- Place of birth: Montevideo, Uruguay
- Height: 1.82 m (6 ft 0 in)
- Position: Midfielder

Team information
- Current team: Cerro Largo
- Number: 21

Senior career*
Years	Team	Apps	(Gls)
2008–2011	Tacuarembo FC	41	(2)
2009–2010	→ Peñarol (loan)	5	(0)
2011–2014	River Plate	60	(4)
2014–2015	Morelia	9	(0)
2015	Danubio	14	(2)
2015	Barcelona SC	20	(0)
2016–2017	Sarmiento	32	(0)
2017	Tigre	4	(0)
2018–2019	Los Andes	12	(2)
2019	Deportivo Maldonado	10	(1)
2020–2021	Cerro Largo	57	(2)
2022–2023	Cerro	39	(0)
2023–	Cerro Largo	36	(0)
- * Club domestic league appearances and goals as of 14 September 2023

Hamilton Pereira (born 26 June 1987) is a Uruguayan footballer who plays for Cerro Largo.

== Career ==
Born in Tacuarembó, Pereira began playing football with local side Tacuarembó FC in the Uruguayan league. He joined Peñarol where he would win the 2009–10 Uruguayan Primera División championship. After a spell with River Plate, he moved on loan to Liga MX side Monarcas Morelia in 2014.

== Titles ==
Peñarol

- Uruguayan Primera División (1): 2009–10

Morelia

- Supercopa MX (1): 2014
