= Carlos Felipe Rodríguez =

Mexican footballer (born 1989)

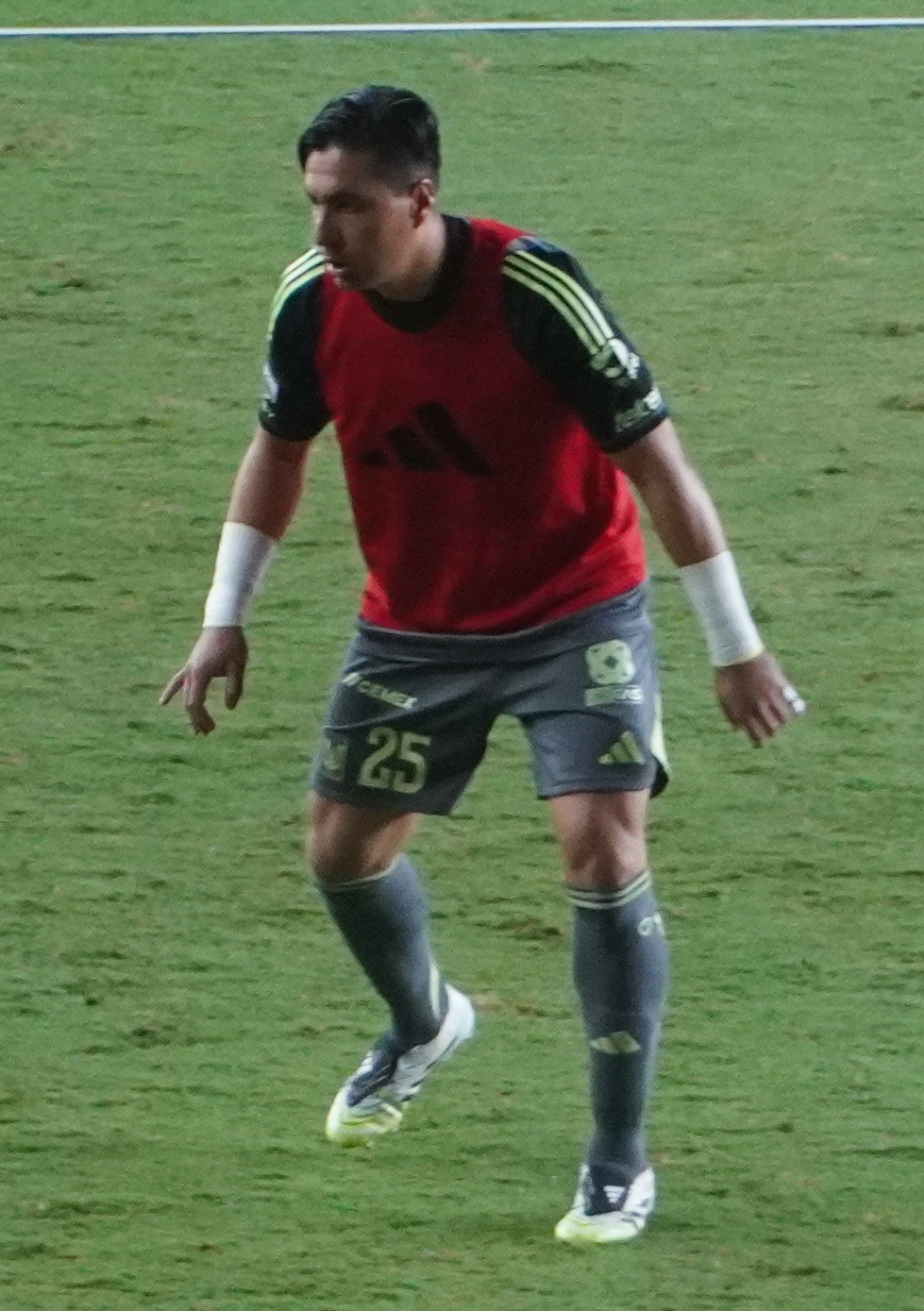
- Rodríguez with Tigres UANL in 2025

Personal information
- Full name: Carlos Felipe Rodríguez Rangel
- Date of birth: 3 April 1989 (age 37)
- Place of birth: Morelia, Michoacán, Mexico
- Height: 1.83 m (6 ft 0 in)
- Position: Goalkeeper

Team information
- Current team: Tigres UANL
- Number: 25

Youth career
- Morelia

Senior career*
Years	Team	Apps	(Gls)
2008–2012	→ Mérida (loan)	17	(0)
2009–2017	Morelia	103	(0)
2011	→ Atlante UTN (loan)	1	(0)
2017–2018	→ León (loan)	7	(0)
2018–2021	Atlético San Luis	64	(0)
2021–2023	Juárez	6	(0)
2023–	Tigres UANL	16	(0)

International career
2011	Mexico U23	3	(0)
- * Club domestic league appearances and goals as of 21 November 2026

Carlos Felipe Rodríguez Rangel (born 3 April 1989) is a Mexican professional footballer who plays as a goalkeeper for Liga MX club Tigres UANL.

== Club career ==
Rodríguez played for Mérida in the Mexican Primera División A during 2008.

== Personal life ==
Rodríguez is the cousin of former professional goalkeeper Moisés Muñoz.

== Honours ==
Morelia

- Copa MX: Apertura 2013
- Supercopa MX: 2014

Tigres UANL

- Campeón de Campeones: 2023
- Campeones Cup: 2023
