= Miguel Sansores =

Mexican footballer (born 1991)

Personal information
- Full name: Miguel Ángel Sansores Sánchez
- Date of birth: 28 April 1991 (age 35)
- Place of birth: Mérida, Yucatán, Mexico
- Height: 1.78 m (5 ft 10 in)
- Position: Forward

Senior career*
Years	Team	Apps	(Gls)
2010–2020	Morelia	121	(24)
2010	→ Mérida (loan)	8	(0)
2011–2013	→ Toros Neza (loan)	34	(3)
2013–2014	→ Cruz Azul Hidalgo (loan)	19	(3)
2020–2024	Mazatlán	52	(8)
2021	→ Tijuana (loan)	27	(2)
2023–2024	→ Puebla (loan)	23	(4)
2024	Malacateco	13	(4)
2025	Puntarenas	9	(1)
- * Club domestic league appearances and goals as of 30 March 2025

Miguel Ángel Sansores Sánchez (born 28 April 1991), also known as El Yuca, is a Mexican professional footballer who plays as a forward for Costa Rican club Puntarenas.

== Club career ==
Sansores made his Monarcas Morelia debut on April 14, 2010, at 18 years as a substitute in a match against Chiapas in a 2 - 1 loss of Monarcas.

== Honours ==
Monarcas Morelia

- SuperLiga: 2010
- Supercopa MX: 2014
