= Fernando Guerrero (referee) =

Mexican football referee (born 1981)

- Full name: Fernando Guerrero Ramírez
- Born: 14 September 1981 (age 45); Mexico City, Mexico

Domestic
| Years | League | Role |
| 2007–2010 | Liga de Ascenso | Referee |
| 2011–2025 | Liga MX | Referee |

International
| Years | League | Role |
| 2014–2024 | FIFA listed | Referee |

Fernando Guerrero Ramírez (born 14 September 1981) is a former Mexican professional football referee. He has been a full international for FIFA since 2014. He refereed matches in the FIFA U-20 World Cup, FIFA World Cup qualifiers and the 2022 FIFA World Cup. He's widely known in Mexico for his nickname, 'Cantante' (singer in Spanish) for his outside hobby.

== Refereeing career ==
=== Domestic career ===
Refereeing since 2004, Guerrero made his official debut on 26 August 2007 in a match between Salamanca and Tapatío. Three years later Guerrero would make his First division debut in a 0–0 draw between Guadalajara and Puebla at Estadio Jalisco, Guadalajara's last home game at the stadium. Guerrero would officiate his first playoff match until the Apertura 2011 season, a match between Querétaro and Guadalajara at Estadio Corregidora. On 5 November 2013, Guerrero would officiate the Apertura 2013 Copa MX final between Morelia and Atlas at Estadio Morelos, this was the first time he officiated a final in his career. On 9 July 2014 Guerrero was the referee for the second leg of the 2014 Supercopa MX between Tigres UANL and Morelia at Estadio Universitario.

Guerrero would officiate his first Liga MX final on 13 December 2015, the second leg of the Apertura 2015 final between UNAM and Tigres UANL. Guerrero officiated the second leg of the Clausura 2016 final between Monterrey and Pachuca at Estadio BBVA Bancomer, his second straight final. Guerrero has gone on to officiate five more Liga MX finals, as well as one Copa MX final and a Campeón de Campeones.

=== International career ===
Guerrero has been a FIFA international referee since 2014. Guerrero officiated his first international game on 29 March 2015, a 2018 FIFA World Cup qualifier between Dominica and the British Virgin Islands at Windsor Park in Roseau. Guerrero has officiated in various international tournaments such as the 2019 FIFA U-20 World Cup in Poland, the 2017 Copa Centroamericana in Panama, and various other CONCACAF tournaments such as the Gold Cup, Champions League and FIFA World Cup qualifiers. Although domestically Guerrero has been known for his on-field presence, internationally he has been known for his role as a Video assistant referee.

Guerrero was selected as a Video assistant referee for the 2021 FIFA Arab Cup in Qatar, he officiated six matches, including the semi-final. Guerrero was selected as a Video assistant referee for the 2021 Africa Cup of Nations in Cameroon, he was in charge of VAR for five matches and also officiated the match between Gambia and Tunisia. On 19 May 2022, FIFA announced Guerrero would be a video assistant referee at the 2022 FIFA World Cup in Qatar. The first match he officiated was a Group D match between Denmark and Tunisia at Education City Stadium. Guerrero would be part of the officiating crew for a total of ten matches, both as a Video assistant referee and an assistant video assistant referee (AVAR). Guerrero served as support video assistant referee for the Final, making him the first Mexican-born referee to be part of an officiating crew at a FIFA World Cup final.
