= Ignacio González (footballer, born 1991) =

Mexican footballer

Personal information
- Full name: Ignacio González Espinoza
- Date of birth: 8 September 1991 (age 35)
- Place of birth: La Barca, Mexico
- Height: 1.78 m (5 ft 10 in)
- Position: Right back

Senior career*
| Years | Team | Apps | (Gls) |
| 2011–2012 | Toros Neza | 36 | (1) |
| 2013 | → UNAM (loan) | 0 | (0) |
| 2014–2019 | Morelia | 62 | (4) |
| 2017–2018 | → Dorados de Sinaloa (loan) | 18 | (1) |
| 2019 | → UAT | 6 | (1) |
| 2020 | UAT | 1 | (0) |
- * Club domestic league appearances and goals

Ignacio González Espinoza (born 8 September 1991) is a Mexican former footballer.

== Career ==
González played for Morelia affiliate Toros Neza from 2011 to 2012 before being loaned to UNAM in November 2012, after an unsuccessful stint he returned to Morelia for the Clausura 2014.

== Honours ==
- Supercopa MX: 2014
