= 2011 Estadio Corona shooting =

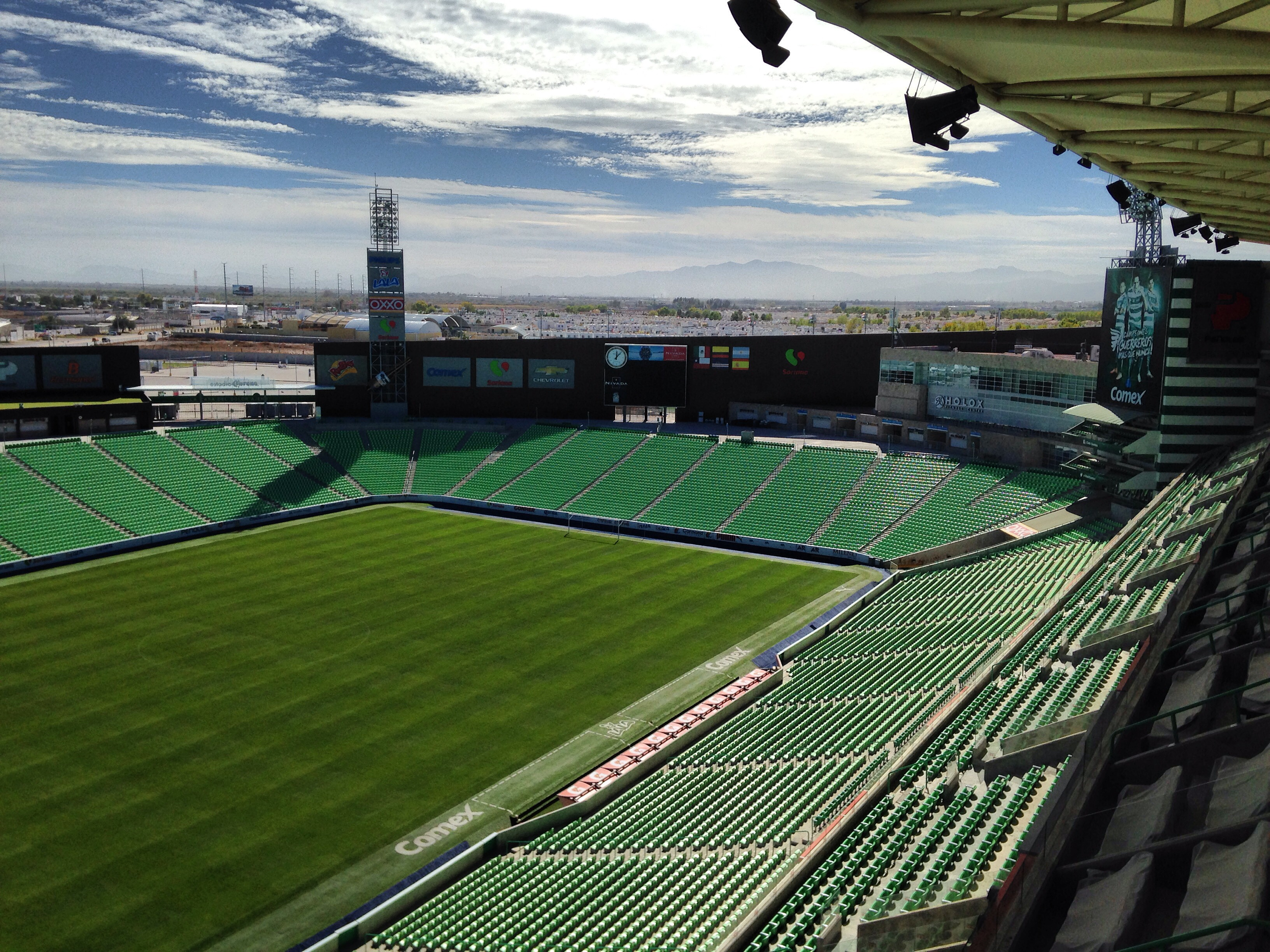
- Estadio TSM Corona
- Date: 20 August 2011
- Location: Estadio Corona Torreón, Coahuila, Mexico
- Injuries: 1

The shootings outside the Estadio Corona occurred on August 20, 2011, during a football match between Santos Laguna and Monarca Morelia, corresponding to the sixth round of the Liga MX Apertura Tournament. The match was suspended in the 40th minute of the first half, after gunshots were heard in the vicinity of the stadium, piercing several windows of the venue and causing panic among those present.

The incident was one of the darkest episodes in Mexican football, and it sparked a debate about stadium security, as it was the first time a league match had been suspended since the start of the war on drugs in 2006, which was at its peak, at least in the north of the country. Nobody inside the stadium was injured but one policeman outside the stadium was injured.

== The match ==
The Estadio Corona recorded one of its best attendances since its inauguration in 2009. In the first half, Morelia had possession of the ball and forwards Miguel Sabah and Rafael Márquez Lugo tried to break the nets of the Santos team, without success.

Forty minutes after the first half ended, gunshots were heard outside the stadium. Players from both teams ran towards the locker rooms. Terrified by this, the goalkeeper of the Purépecha team, Federico Vilar, ran towards one of the tunnels of the stadium in what was one of the most remembered images of that day, which caused the referee Francisco Chacón to stop the match.

== The incident ==
Once the match was stopped, the players decided to go their separate ways, starting with goalkeeper Oswaldo Sánchez. Meanwhile, the fans had no idea where the sounds were coming from; some took refuge among the seats, while others dropped to their knees with their hands on their heads. There were also those who ran onto the field.

Authorities reported that the shootout originated on the Torreón–San Pedro highway, where a convoy of three pickup trucks refused to stop at a Torreón municipal police checkpoint. One municipal police officer was wounded as a result of the shooting.

== Aftermath ==
=== Reactions ===
Given its nature, the episode attracted international media attention. The BBC described it as "an unprecedented event in Mexican football".

The Spanish newspaper Diario AS declared that "Mexican football was a victim of violence". The French newspaper L'Équipe reported: "Panic in the stadium" and reiterated the security problem that Mexico was experiencing at that time.

The president of Santos Laguna, Alejandro Irarragorri Gutiérrez, issued an apology for what happened.

=== Rescheduling of the match and semifinal clash ===
The match between the two teams was rescheduled for 1 November 2011; starting at 40 minutes exactly where they left off. Morelia would win with a score of 2–0. Subsequently, the Michoacán club finished in seventh place in the standings with 23 points, while Santos Laguna finished in fourth place with 27, which gave them passage to the liguilla (playoffs). The two teams faced each other again in the semifinals, with Morelia taking the victory in the first leg (2–1) held at the Estadio Morelos, but Santos managed to win the rematch (3–2) at the TSM Corona, which gave them a pass to the final thanks to their position in the table, although they finished as runners-up after failing to defeat Tigres UANL.
