= Carlos Guzmán =

Mexican footballer (born 1994)

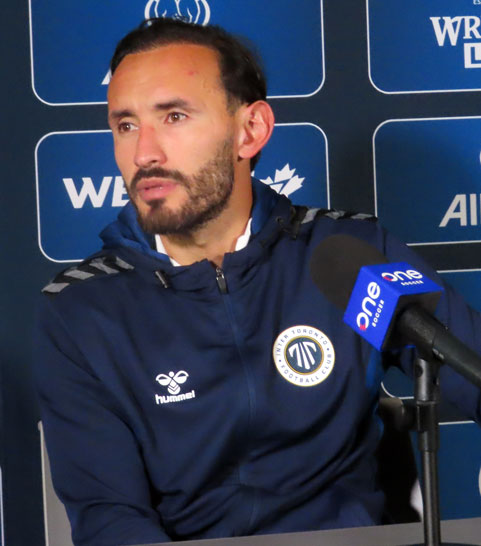
- Guzmán in 2026

Personal information
- Full name: Carlos Alberto Guzmán Fonseca
- Date of birth: 19 May 1994 (age 32)
- Place of birth: Morelia, Michoacan, Mexico
- Height: 1.76 m (5 ft 9 in)
- Position: Right-back

Team information
- Current team: Inter Toronto FC
- Number: 8

Youth career
- 2010–2011: Morelia

Senior career*
Years	Team	Apps	(Gls)
2011–2018	Morelia	80	(7)
2012	→ Toros Neza (loan)	6	(0)
2013	→ Atlético San Luis (loan)	16	(2)
2014	→ Puebla (loan)	14	(0)
2015–2016	→ Tijuana (loan)	27	(1)
2016–2017	→ León (loan)	15	(0)
2019–2021	Necaxa	8	(1)
2021	Atlético Morelia	18	(1)
2022	Toluca	23	(0)
2023	Querétaro	10	(0)
2023	San Diego Loyal	15	(1)
2024–2025	Monterey Bay FC	56	(2)
2026–	Inter Toronto FC	25	(0)

International career^{‡}
2011	Mexico U17	6	(0)
2014	Mexico U21	1	(0)
Medal record
Representing Mexico
Men's football
FIFA U-17 World Cup
Winner	2011 Mexico
Pan American Games
Silver medal – second place	2015 Toronto	Team
- * Club domestic league appearances and goals as of 31 October 2026 ‡ National team caps and goals as of 22 May 2014

Carlos Alberto Guzmán Fonseca (born 19 May 1994) is a Mexican professional footballer who plays as a right-back for Canadian Premier League club Inter Toronto FC.

== Club career ==
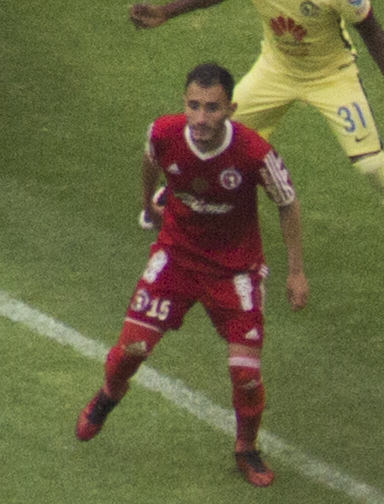
Guzmán playing for Tijuana

Guzmán began his career with Monarcas Morelia in their youth system. On November 4, 2011, Guzmán made his professional debut for the club in a 1–0 victory over Chiapas.

He was loaned out to Toros Neza for six months where he made six appearances in the Apertura 2012 Copa MX for the club, but did not make any league appearances during his loan stint. He was later sent out on loan to Atlético San Luis where he had more playing time and earned the trust of first division club Puebla who signed him for the 2014 tournament. In the 2014 Torneo Apertura, Carlos would become a regular for the club. He has currently played in every game scoring 3 goals against Pumas, Leones Negros and Cruz Azul.

Guzmán signed with USL Championship club Monterey Bay FC on December 4, 2023. He left the club as a free agent following the 2025 season.

On February 11, 2026, Guzmán signed with Inter Toronto FC of the Canadian Premier League.

== International career ==
Guzmán was part of Mexico's under-17 squad that won the 2011 FIFA U-17 World Cup in home soil. Carlos Guzman was also part of the U-21 Mexican team participating in the 2014 Toulon Tournament

== Honours ==
Morelia

- Supercopa MX: 2014

Mexico Youth

- FIFA U-17 World Cup: 2011
- Central American and Caribbean Games: 2014
- Pan American Silver Medal: 2015
