= Armando Zamorano =

Mexican footballer (born 1993)

Personal information
- Full name: Armando Cipriano Zamorano Flores
- Date of birth: 3 October 1993 (age 33)
- Place of birth: Autlán, Jalisco, Mexico
- Height: 1.66 m (5 ft 5 in)
- Position: Midfielder

Team information
- Current team: Coatepeque
- Number: 10

Senior career*
Years	Team	Apps	(Gls)
2011–2013	Chiapas	49	(1)
2013–2016	Morelia	80	(4)
2016	→ Querétaro (loan)	8	(1)
2017–2018	Querétaro	7	(0)
2018–2019	Sonora	22	(2)
2019–2020	Cafetaleros	18	(2)
2020–2022	Cancún	55	(5)
2022–2023	UAT	10	(1)
2023-	Coatepeque	6	(0)

International career
- Mexico U17
- Mexico U20
Medal record
Representing Mexico
Winner	FIFA U-17 World Cup	2011
Winner	CONCACAF U-20 Championship	2013
- * Club domestic league appearances and goals as of 29 January 2024

Armando Cipriano Zamorano Flores (born 3 October 1993) is a Mexican professional footballer who plays as a midfielder for Liga Nacional club Coatepeque.

== Club ==
Zamorano started his career with Chiapas, and made his debut in a 2–0 defeat against Atlas on 24 April 2011. In the summer of 2013, he joined Atlético Morelia and won the 2013 Copa MX, where he scored in the final against Atlas. He played in the two Supercopa MX matches against Tigres, where his team won 5–4 on aggregate and classified to the 2015 Copa Libertadores.

On 8 June 2016, Zamorano joined Querétaro on loan for the Apertura 2016. After winning the 2016 Copa MX, in December 2016 he permanently joined the club.

On 10 June 2018, Zamorano joined Ascenso MX club Cimarrones de Sonora. In the summer of 2019 he joined Cafetaleros de Chiapas, he scored his first goal on 24 August 2019, against Alebrijes de Oaxaca in a 2–1 defeat.

On 10 July 2020, Zamorano joined Cancún FC. In June 2022, he joined Correcaminos UAT.

On 27 October 2023, Zamorano joined Guatemalan club Coatepeque on a short-term contract, as requested by the manager Francisco Ramírez, after the club failed to register Luis Márquez as foreign player.

== International ==
Armando was part of the Mexico U-17 team to win the under-17 World Cup at home soil for the first time in the tournament history. He would soon become a regular player for Mexico being called up for different youth tournaments for different category such as with Mexico U-20 for the 2013 FIFA U-20 World Cup and eventually with the under-21 for the Central American and Caribbean Games.

== Career statistics ==
=== Club ===
As of 29 January 2024

Appearances and goals by club, season and competition
Club	Season	League			National cup		Continental		Other		Total	
Club	Season	Division	Apps	Goals	Apps	Goals	Apps	Goals	Apps	Goals	Apps	Goals
Chiapas	2010–11	Liga MX	1	0	—		1 (Note: Appearances in Copa Libertadores)	0	—		2	0
Chiapas	2011–12	Liga MX	28	1	—		—		—		28	1
Chiapas	2012–13	Liga MX	20	0	4	0	—		—		24	0
Chiapas	Total		49	1	4	0	1	0	0	0	54	1
Atlético Morelia	2013–14	Liga MX	30	1	9	2	—		—		39	3
Atlético Morelia	2014–15	Liga MX	23	2	3	1	2	1	2 (Note: Appearances in Supercopa MX)	0	30	4
Atlético Morelia	2015–16	Liga MX	27	1	8	2	1	0	1	0	37	3
Atlético Morelia	Total		80	4	20	5	3	1	3	0	106	10
Querétaro (loan)	2016–17	Liga MX	8	1	10	1	—		—		18	2
Querétaro	2017–18	Liga MX	7	0	4	0	—		—		11	0
Sonora	2018–19	Ascenso MX	22	2	1	0	—		—		23	2
Cafetaleros	2019–20	Ascenso MX	18	2	3	0	—		—		21	2
Cancún	2020–21	Liga de Expansión MX	31	2	—		—		—		31	2
Cancún	2021–22	Liga de Expansión MX	24	3	—		—		—		24	3
Cancún	Total		55	5	0	0	0	0	0	0	55	5
UAT	2022–23	Liga de Expansión MX	33	2	—		—		—		33	2
Coatepeque	2023–24	Liga Nacional de Guatemala	6	0	0	0	—		—		6	0
Career total			278	17	42	6	4	1	3	0	327	24

== Honours ==
Morelia

- Copa MX: Apertura 2013
- Supercopa MX: 2014

Querétaro

- Copa MX: Apertura 2016

Mexico Youth

- FIFA U-17 World Cup: 2011
- CONCACAF U-20 Championship: 2013
- Central American and Caribbean Games: 2014
