= Joel Huiqui =

Mexican footballer (born 1983)

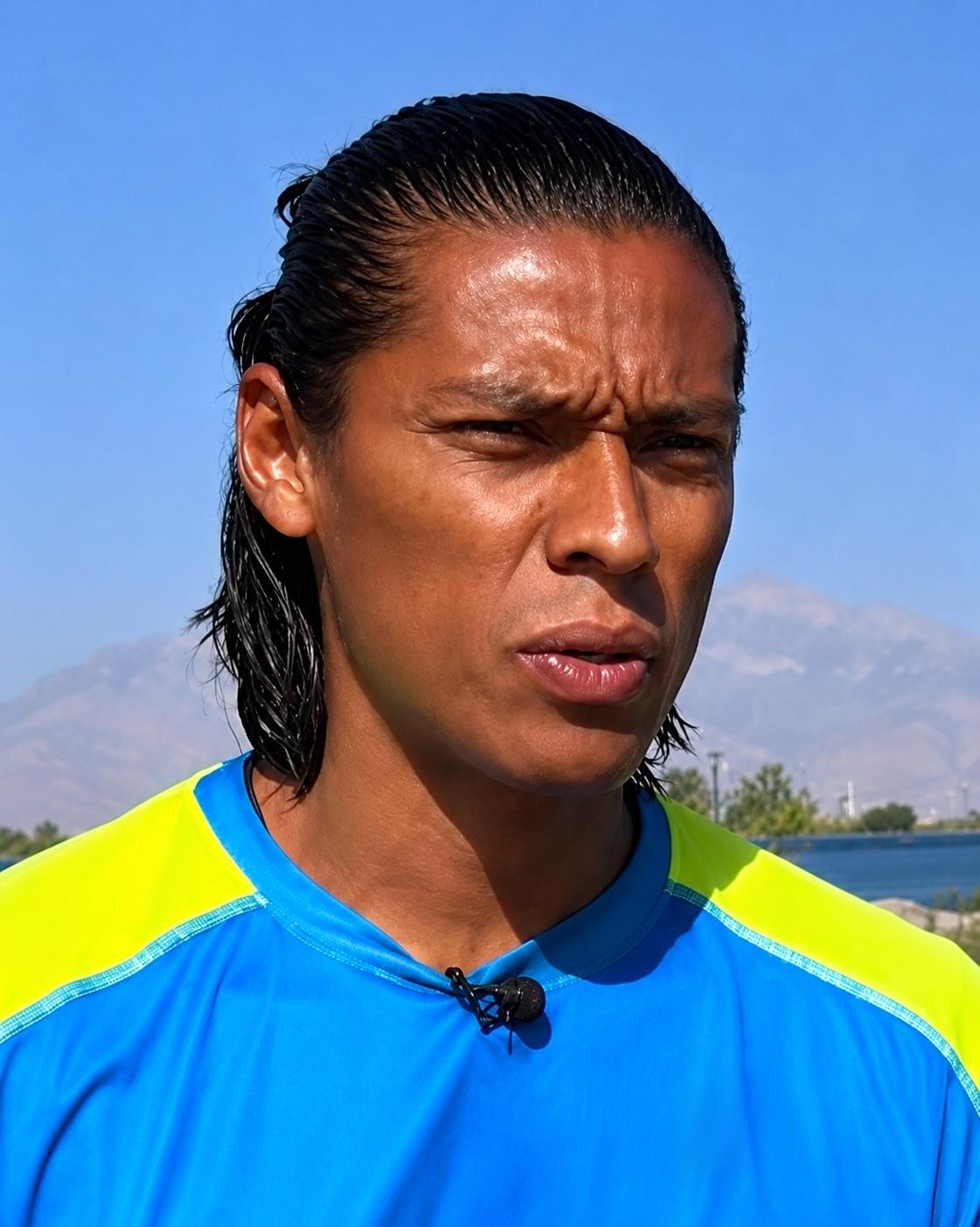
- Huiqui in 2018

Personal information
- Full name: Joel Adrián Huiqui Andrade
- Date of birth: 18 February 1983 (age 43)
- Place of birth: Los Mochis, Sinaloa, Mexico
- Height: 1.85 m (6 ft 1 in)
- Position: Centre-back

Team information
- Current team: Cruz Azul (head coach)

Youth career
- –2002: Hermosillo Hidalgo

Senior career*
Years	Team	Apps	(Gls)
2002–2010	Cruz Azul	135	(4)
2003–2004	→ Pachuca (loan)	38	(0)
2011–2012	→ Morelia (loan)	57	(2)
2012–2015	Morelia	104	(4)
2016–2017	→ Cafetaleros (loan)	26	(1)
2017	→ Potros UAEM (loan)	10	(2)
2018	Las Vegas Lights	24	(4)
Total		394	(17)

International career
2003	Mexico U20	3	(0)
2005–2013	Mexico	14	(1)

Managerial career
- 2019–2021: Cruz Azul Reserves and Academy
- 2021–2022: Juárez (Liga TDP)
- 2023: Cruz Azul Reserves and Academy
- 2023: Cruz Azul (assistant)
- 2024–2025: Cruz Azul U23 (assistant)
- 2025: Cruz Azul (assistant)
- 2026: Cruz Azul U21
- 2026: Cruz Azul (interim)
- 2026–: Cruz Azul
- * Club domestic league appearances and goals

Joel Adrián Huiqui Andrade (Note: In this Spanish name, the first or paternal surname is Huiqui and the second or maternal family name is Andrade.) (born 18 February 1983) is a Mexican football manager and former footballer who played as a centre-back. He is the head coach of Liga MX club Cruz Azul.

== Playing career ==
=== Club ===
Huiqui came up through the youth academy of Cruz Azul Hidalgo, a second-division team affiliated with Cruz Azul. During the Apertura 2003, he was sent on loan to Pachuca, where he made his top-flight debut in a league match against Tigres UANL. In that tournament, he became a champion with Los Tuzos. However, he only spent one year at Pachuca before Cruz Azul brought him into the main squad, where he went on to play for six years.

He gained notoriety for a controversial handball incident during the Apertura 2009 semi-finals against Morelia, when he deliberately used his hand to block a goal-bound shot from Wilson Tiago. The incident became known as “La Muertinha.”

Following his departure from Cruz Azul, he joined Monarcas Morelia, where he made over 100 appearances, before going on to represent Toros Neza, Cafetaleros de Tapachula, and Potros UAEM. He concluded his playing career with Las Vegas Lights.

=== International ===
Huiqui was part of the squad during the qualifiers for the 2006 FIFA World Cup but was ultimately not selected by coach Ricardo La Volpe for the final 23-man roster. He captained the Mexico national team during the 2013 CONCACAF Gold Cup.

== Managerial career ==
=== Early career ===
After retiring as a player, Huiqui began his coaching career within the Cruz Azul youth academy, eventually rising to become a head coach for the club's youth squads. In 2021, he left the club to manage Juárez's squad in the Liga TDP, Mexico's fourth division. Two years later, he returned to Cruz Azul to rejoin the academy coaching staff, and on 14 February 2023, he was appointed as an assistant coach to Joaquín Moreno during his interim period with the first team. Following the departure of Ricardo Ferretti, Huiqui continued as an assistant under Moreno for the remainder of the Apertura 2023 tournament before returning to his duties within the club's youth development structure.

On 25 January 2025, following the departure of Martín Anselmi, Huiqui rejoined the first team as an assistant to Vicente Sánchez for the remainder of the season, helping the team win their seventh CONCACAF Champions Cup. He subsequently served as an institutional assistant coach under Nicolás Larcamón for the duration of the Apertura 2025 tournament.

=== Cruz Azul ===
On 22 April 2026, Huiqui was appointed as Cruz Azul's interim manager following the dismissal of Larcamón. He took charge for the final matchday of the regular season before guiding the team through the playoffs—defeating Atlas in the quarter-finals and eliminating Guadalajara before securing a 2–1 victory against Pumas UNAM in the final. This triumph clinched the club's tenth league title and Huiqui's first as manager. Having secured the Liga MX championship in just seven matches, he became only the second coach in history to win the title within a single-digit match count, trailing only Alberto Jorge, who accomplished the feat in four matches.

On 8 July, Cruz Azul officially announced the appointment of Huiqui as head coach ahead of the 2026–27 season.

== Personal life ==
Born in Los Mochis, Sinaloa, to Native Mexican parents. Huiqui is ethnic Mayo. His paternal surname is of Mayo descent, comes from Indigenous people of Sonora and Sinaloa.

== Career statistics ==
=== International ===
As of match played 25 July 2013

National team	Year	Apps	Goals
Mexico	2005	4	1
Mexico	2006	4	0
Mexico	2012	1	0
Mexico	2013	5	0
Total		14	1

=== International goals ===
#	Date	Venue	Opponent	Score	Result	Competition
1.	14 December 2005	Chase Field, Phoenix, United States	Hungary	2–0	2–0	Friendly

== Managerial statistics ==
As of match played 7 November 2026

Managerial record by team and tenure
Team	From	To	Record								Ref.
Team	From	To	G	W	D	L	GF	GA	GD	Win %	Ref.
Cruz Azul	22 April 2026	Present	27	18	4	5	58	37	+21	66.67	
Total			27	18	4	5	58	37	+21	66.67	—

== Honours ==
=== Player ===
Pachuca

- Mexican Primera División: Apertura 2003

Morelia

- Copa MX: Apertura 2013
- Supercopa MX: 2014

=== Manager ===
Cruz Azul

- Liga MX: Clausura 2026
- Campeón de Campeones: 2026
