= Rodrigo Godínez =

Mexican footballer (born 1992)

Personal information
- Full name: Rodrigo Godínez Orozco
- Date of birth: 21 September 1992 (age 34)
- Place of birth: Zamora, Michoacán, Mexico
- Height: 1.85 m (6 ft 1 in)
- Position: Defender

Youth career
- 2009–2011: Atlas
- 2011–2012: Morelia

Senior career*
Years	Team	Apps	(Gls)
2012–2014	Morelia	41	(0)
2015	→ Atlas (loan)	2	(0)
2016	→ Veracruz (loan)	2	(0)
2016–2017	→ BUAP (loan)	21	(2)
2018	BUAP	9	(0)
2019–2022	UdeG	97	(11)
2022–2024	Tijuana	23	(0)
- * Club domestic league appearances and goals as of 27 April 2024

Rodrigo Godínez Orozco (born 21 September 1992) is a Mexican professional footballer who plays as a defender.

== Club career ==
Godínez was born in Zamora, Michoacán. He moved to the city of Guadalajara when he was ten years old. He enrolled in the C.D. Guadalajara academy where he stayed four years. Godínez then tried his luck at Atotonilco FC of the Tercera División, the fourth level of Mexican football. He joined the Atlas youth teams and then went on to play for Morelia's youth team.

Godínez made his first division debut on September 21, 2012, his 20th birthday, starting in a 1–1 draw against Tigres UANL. Godínez was replaced in the 52nd minute by Jefferson Montero.

Godínez helped Morelia win the Apertura 2013 Copa MX and the 2014 Supercopa MX since debuting with the team.

In January 2019, Godínez moved to Leones Negros.

== Honours ==
Morelia

- Copa MX: Apertura 2013
- Supercopa MX: 2014

Veracruz

- Copa MX: Clausura 2016
