= Carlos Adrián Morales =

Mexican footballer (born 1979)

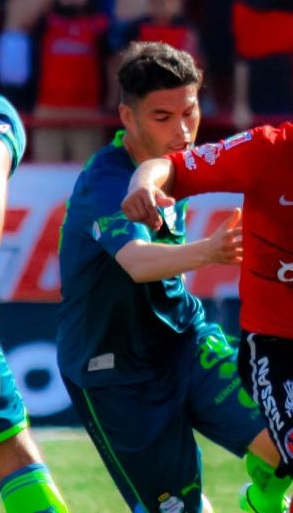
- Morales playing for Santos Laguna

Personal information
- Full name: Carlos Adrián Morales Higuera
- Date of birth: 6 September 1979 (age 47)
- Place of birth: La Piedad, Michoacán, Mexico
- Height: 1.74 m (5 ft 8 1/2 in)
- Position: Midfielder

Team information
- Current team: Puebla U-21 (Manager)

Senior career*
Years	Team	Apps	(Gls)
1997–1998	C.F. La Piedad	28	(6)
1998–2004	Morelia	203	(25)
2001	→ Pachuca (loan)	8	(0)
2004–2006	Tigres UANL	81	(6)
2006–2008	Toluca	81	(9)
2009	Tecos	34	(7)
2010–2012	Santos Laguna	100	(5)
2012–2018	Morelia	172	(16)
2017–2018	→ Lobos BUAP (loan)	20	(0)
2019	Morelia	1	(0)

International career
1999	Mexico U20	5	(0)
1999–2005	Mexico	8	(0)

Managerial career
- 2020: Toluca (Interim)
- 2023: Atlético Morelia
- 2024–2026: Puebla (women)
- 2026–: Puebla Reserves and Academy
Medal record
Representing Mexico
Runner-up	Copa America	2001
- * Club domestic league appearances and goals

Carlos Adrián Morales Higuera (Note: In this Spanish name, the first or paternal surname is Morales and the second or maternal family name is Higuera.) (born 6 September 1979) is a Mexican former professional footballer. He last played for Lobos BUAP on loan from Morelia in Liga MX. He recently was the manager of Atlético Morelia

A versatile midfielder and accurate set-piece taker, Carlos can play as a central midfielder, winger, wing-back and full-back. He began his career by debuting with Mexico's Ascenso MX La Piedad (based on the city in the Mexican State of Michoacán) (1997-'98), then was brought forth to Liga MX by Morelia (1998–2001, 2002–2004, 2012), later on he would move to Pachuca (2001–2002), Tigres (2003–2006), Toluca (2006–2009), Tecos (2009) and Santos Laguna (2010–2012).

Carlos is the brother of Ramón Morales, a former footballer.

== Honours ==
Morelia

- Primera División: Invierno 2000
- Copa MX: Apertura 2013
- Supercopa MX: 2014

Tigres UANL

- InterLiga: 2005, 2006

Pachuca

- Primera División: Invierno 2001

Toluca

- Primera División: Apertura 2008

Santos Laguna

- Primera División: Clausura 2012
