= Jorge Luis Calderón =

Mexican footballer (born 1994)

Jorge Luis Calderón Pérez (10 February 1994 – 2 June 2024) was a Mexican professional footballer who played as a forward for Club León. He was two-time league winner with the club, winning both the Apertura and the Clausura of the 2013–14 Liga MX season. He left Club León in 2017. Calderón died on 2 June 2024, the age of 30.
