= Éver Guzmán =

Mexican footballer (born 1988)

Personal information
- Full name: Éver Arsenio Guzmán Zavala
- Date of birth: 15 March 1988 (age 38)
- Place of birth: Moroleón, Guanajuato, Mexico
- Height: 1.74 m (5 ft 8 1/2 in)
- Position: Forward

Senior career*
Years	Team	Apps	(Gls)
2004–2014	Morelia	50	(7)
2009–2010	→ Venados (loan)	27	(7)
2010–2011	→ Veracruz (loan)	28	(0)
2011–2012	→ Mérida (loan)	31	(16)
2012–2013	→ Toros Neza (loan)	34	(9)
2014–2015	→ Lobos BUAP (loan)	7	(0)
2015–2017	Correcaminos UAT	53	(9)
2017–2019	San Antonio FC	61	(23)
2020	Hartford Athletic	12	(5)
2021	Antigua	9	(0)

International career
2005	Mexico U17	5	(5)
2007	Mexico U23	3	(0)
Medal record
Representing Mexico
Winner	FIFA U-17 World Championship	2005
Men's Football
Pan American Games
Bronze medal – third place	2007 Rio de Janeiro	Team competition
- * Club domestic league appearances and goals

Éver Arsenio Guzmán Zavala (born 15 March 1988) is a Mexican former footballer who last played as a forward for Guatemalan team Antigua.

== Professional ==
Although having debuted professionally on 15 May 2004 in a game against C.F. Pachuca, Guzmán saw little action with Monarcas until the Clausura 2006 tournament, where he was used consistently by coach Darío Franco. Éver scored his first professional goal in a game against Club Atlas, on 11 February 2006. The goal would prove crucial, as it would put Monarcas in the lead and eventually earn them a draw as Atlas clawed back to tie the game 1–1.

Guzmán played three seasons for San Antonio FC of the USL Championship and left the club as its all-time leading scorer.

In January 2020, Guzmán joined fellow USL Championship side Hartford Athletic. Guzman had five goals in 13 matches for Hartford. in the abbreviated 2020 season. In March 2021, Guzman signed with Antigua GFC of the Liga Nacional de Fútbol de Guatemala.

== International ==
Guzmán is possibly best known for being part of the Mexico national team that won the 2005 U-17 FIFA World Cup. During the tournament, Guzmán was head coach Jesús Ramírez's top reserve, scoring four goals, earning him the distinction of being the second top scorer of the tournament, only below teammate Carlos Vela.

== Honours ==
Morelia

- Copa MX: Apertura 2013

Mexico U17

- FIFA U-17 World Championship: 2005
