= Pablo Metlich =

Mexican footballer (born 1978)

Personal information
- Full name: Pablo Arturo Metlich Ruíz
- Date of birth: 2 September 1978 (age 48)
- Place of birth: Gómez Palacio, Durango, Mexico
- Height: 1.69 m (5 ft 7 in)
- Position: Midfielder

Senior career*
Years	Team	Apps	(Gls)
2002–2009	Tecos UAG	120	(4)
2009–2011	Lobos BUAP	68	(16)
2011	Indios	14	(0)
2012–2013	Veracruz	14	(0)
2013–2015	Atlético San Luis	-	(-)
- * Club domestic league appearances and goals as of 25 August 2013

Pablo Arturo Metlich Ruíz (born 2 September 1978) is a Mexican former professional footballer, who last played as a midfielder for Atlético San Luis. Metlich made his professional debut with Tecos in 2002. He is of partial Serbian descent.
