= Hibert Ruíz =

Mexican footballer (born 1987)

Hibert Ruiz
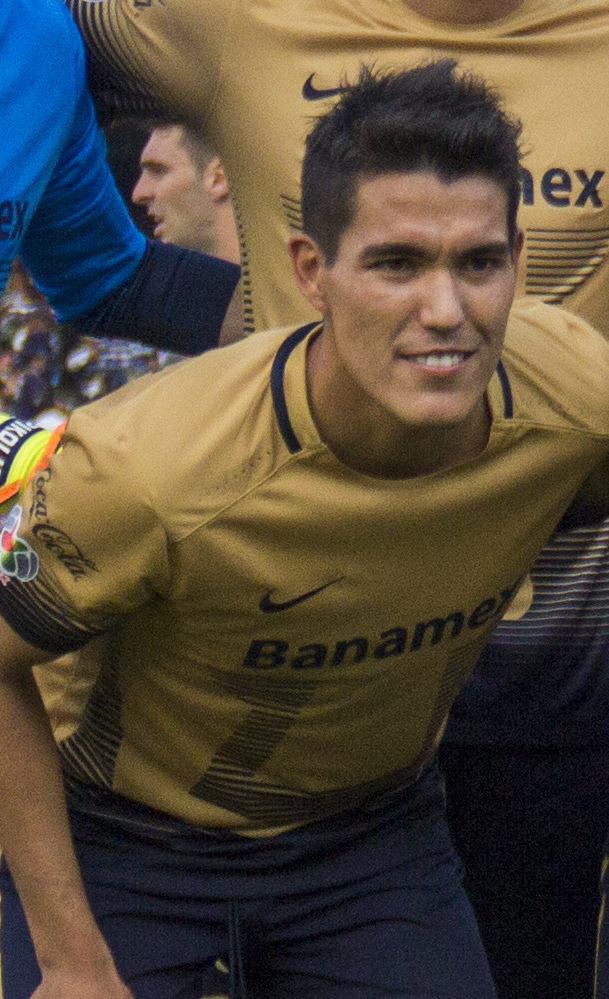

Personal information
- Full name: José Hibert Ruíz Vázquez
- Date of birth: 25 May 1987 (age 39)
- Place of birth: León, Guanajuato, Mexico
- Height: 1.79 m (5 ft 10 1/2 in)
- Position: Midfielder

Senior career*
Years	Team	Apps	(Gls)
2006–2010	León	40	(3)
2011	Potros Neza	18	(1)
2011	Querétaro	20	(1)
2012	Chiapas	7	(0)
2012–2015	Morelia	57	(1)
2016	→ UNAM (loan)	11	(0)
2016–2017	→ Chiapas (loan)	8	(0)
2017	→ UdeG (loan)	15	(2)
2018	Veracruz	12	(2)
2019	Necaxa	8	(0)
2020	UAT	7	(0)

Managerial career
- 2021: UAT
- * Club domestic league appearances and goals as of 21:25, 6 January 2018 (UTC)

José Hibert Ruíz Vázquez (Note: In this Spanish name, the first or paternal surname is Ruíz and the second or maternal family name is Vázquez.) (born 25 May 1987) is a Mexican former footballer and manager. Since March 11, 2021, he is the manager of Correcaminos UAT that plays in the Liga de Expansión MX.

== Pumas UNAM ==
In December 2015, it was announced that Ruiz would be joining Pumas UNAM in a season-long loan deal.

== Honours ==
=== Club ===
Morelia

- Copa MX (1): Apertura 2013
- Supercopa MX (1): 2014
