= Jorge Zárate (footballer) =

Mexican footballer (born 1992)

Jorge Zarate
Personal information
- Full name: Jorge Alejandro Zárate Careaga
- Date of birth: 20 January 1992 (age 34)
- Place of birth: San Luis Potosí, Mexico
- Height: 1.68 m (5 ft 6 in)
- Position: Midfielder

Team information
- Current team: UAT
- Number: 11

Youth career
- 2008–2010: Puebla

Senior career*
Years	Team	Apps	(Gls)
2010–2013	Puebla	10	(0)
2011–2012	→ BUAP (loan)	33	(3)
2012–2013	→ Chiapas (loan)	4	(0)
2013–2019	Morelia	89	(5)
2015	→ Atlas (loan)	7	(0)
2018–2019	→ BUAP (loan)	0	(0)
2019–2020	Puebla	8	(1)
2020–2021	Tlaxcala	25	(4)
2021–2022	Mazatlán	13	(0)
2022–	UAT	6	(0)
- * Club domestic league appearances and goals as of 8 May 2022

Jorge Alejandro Zárate Careaga (born 20 January 1992) is a Mexican professional footballer who plays as a midfielder.

== Career ==
=== Youth ===
Zárate was born in San Luis Potosí, and joined Pubelas youth academy in 2008. He continued through Puebla's Youth Academy successfully going through U-17 and U-20. Until finally reaching the first team, José Luis Sánchez Solá being the coach promoting Zárate to first team. Zárate also later forming part of Chiapas F.C. Youth Academy in 2012 and Morelia Youth Academy in 2013.

=== Puebla ===
On Sunday April 11, 2010 Zárate made his debut with the top club against Indios in a 2–1 loss.

=== Morelia ===
On May 31, 2013 Morelia signed Zárate for an undisclosed amount. Zárate made his debut on October 4, 2014, against Chiapas F.C. ending in a 2–1 win only playing the last 5 mins Zarate returned from loan at Querétaro and Zarate scored in a 1–1 tie with club America.

== Honours ==
Morelia

- Copa MX: Apertura 2013
- Supercopa MX: 2014
