= Jorge Aparicio (Mexican footballer) =

Mexican footballer (born 1989)

Personal information
- Full name: Jorge Aparicio Estrada
- Date of birth: May 27, 1989 (age 37)
- Place of birth: Mexico City, Mexico
- Height: 1.76 m (5 ft 9 in)
- Position: Midfielder

Senior career*
Years	Team	Apps	(Gls)
2011–2013	Celaya	28	(0)
2012–2013	→ C.F. La Piedad (loan)	8	(0)
2013–2015	Celaya	13	(0)
2015–2016	→ Sonora (loan)	5	(0)
Medal record
First place	Liga de Expansión MX	2013
- * Club domestic league appearances and goals

Jorge Aparicio Estrada (born May 27, 1989) is a Mexican professional footballer who played for Sonora of Ascenso MX on loan from Celaya.
