= Supercopa MX =

Defunct association football competition in Mexico

- Organiser(s): Liga MX; Mexican Football Federation
- Founded: 2014; 12 years ago
- Abolished: 2019; 7 years ago
- Region: Mexico
- Teams: 2
- Last champions: Cruz Azul (1st title)
- Most championships: Cruz Azul; Guadalajara; Monarcas Morelia; Necaxa; Puebla; Querétaro (1 title each)
- Broadcaster: TDN

Supercopa MX was a professional association football super cup in Mexico, contested by the champions of the Apertura and Clausura tournaments of the Copa MX. It was held between 2014 and 2019, and the winners of the trophy qualified as "Mexico-3" for the Copa Libertadores in 2014 and 2015.

The trophy was contested in six editions, with the inaugural edition played in 2014, and Monarcas Morelia was crowned the first champion. Six clubs won the title: Monarcas Morelia, Necaxa, Puebla, Guadalajara, Querétaro and Cruz Azul with one title each.

== History ==
On 20 June 2014, it was announced the two Copa MX champions would face each other in a two legged home and away matches and the winners would receive a new trophy named Supercopa MX.

The 2015 Supercopa MX was a single match at a neutral venue, Toyota Stadium in Frisco, Texas, United States, making Mexico the fourth nation (after Italy, France and Turkey) and first North American nation to stage its Super Cup abroad.

On 20 May 2019, it was announced that the Copa MX would be held once a year (July–April), according to the FIFA world football calendar and the Supercopa MX was abolished.

== Competition format ==
The Copa MX champions of the Apertura and Clausura tournaments qualified directly for the Supercopa MX, unless either of the two qualifying clubs also won the Liga MX Apertura or Clausura tournament in the same season, in which case they qualified directly for the Campeón de Campeones and did not compete in the Supercopa MX, since both trophies were contested in the same day prior to the start of the new Liga MX season.

The previous year's Supercopa MX champions were the clubs that replaced those ineligible to compete for the trophy. If the Supercopa MX title holders was also one of the clubs that qualified for the Campeón de Campeones, then the club with the most points in the annual accumulated table of the Copa MX would compete for the trophy.

== Results ==
Ed.	Season	Apertura champion	Score	Clausura champion
1	2014	Monarcas Morelia	4–1; 1–3	Tigres UANL
2	2015	Monarcas Morelia (Note: Santos Laguna won the Apertura 2014 Copa MX and the Clausura 2015 Liga MX, thus qualifying for the 2015 Campeón de Campeones. It was replaced by Morelia, the Supercopa MX title holders.)	0–1	Puebla
3	2016	Guadalajara	2–0	Veracruz
4	2017	Querétaro	2–0	América (Note: Guadalajara won the Clausura 2017 Copa MX and the Clausura 2017 Liga MX, thus qualifying for the 2017 Campeón de Campeones. However, Guadalajara was also the Supercopa MX title holders, it was replaced by América, the club with the most points in the annual accumulated table of the Copa MX.)
5	2018	Monterrey	0–1	Necaxa
6	2019	Cruz Azul	4–0	Necaxa (Note: América won the Clausura 2019 Copa MX and the Apertura 2018 Liga MX, thus qualifying for the 2019 Campeón de Campeones. It was replaced by Necaxa, the Supercopa MX title holders.)

== Performances ==
Rank	Club	Titles	Runner-up	Seasons
1	Monarcas Morelia	1	1	2014
1	Necaxa	1	1	2018
1	Puebla	1	0	2015
1	Guadalajara	1	0	2016
1	Querétaro	1	0	2017
1	Cruz Azul	1	0	2019
7	Tigres UANL	0	1	—
7	Veracruz^{1}	0	1	—
7	América	0	1	—
7	Monterrey	0	1	—

Notes

1. Defunct.

== Supercopa de la Liga MX ==
Supercopa de la Liga MX is a professional association football super cup in Mexico, contested by the two most recent winners of the Campeón de Campeones. However, this trophy is only contested when a club has won both tournaments of the Liga MX season (Apertura and Clausura), therefore the Campeón de Campeones is automatically awarded, and that match is replaced by the Supercopa de la Liga MX, due to the league commercial commitments.

The trophy has been contested in two editions, with the inaugural edition played in 2022, and Cruz Azul was crowned the first champion. Two clubs have won the title: Cruz Azul and América with one title each.

=== Results ===
Ed.	Season	Champion	Score	Runner-up
1	2022	Cruz Azul	2–2 (4–3 p)	Atlas
2	2024	América	2–1	Tigres UANL

=== Performances ===
Rank	Club	Titles	Runner-up	Seasons
1	Cruz Azul	1	0	2022
1	América	1	0	2024
3	Atlas	0	1	—
3	Tigres UANL	0	1	—

== See also ==
- Sport in Mexico
- Football in Mexico
- Mexican Football Federation
- Liga MX
- Copa MX
- Campeón de Campeones
