= 2012–13 Monarcas Morelia season =

Morelia
2012–13 season
- Chairman: Álvaro Dávila
- Manager: Rubén Omar Romano (Until February 18, 2013); Mario Juárez (interim) (February 18, 2013–February 19, 2013); Carlos Bustos (from February 19, 2013)
- Stadium: Estadio Morelos
- Apertura 2012: 5th Final phase quarter-finals
- Clausura 2013: 4th Final phase quarter-finals
- Copa MX (Apertura): Group stage
- Copa MX (Clausura): Group stage
- Top goalscorer: League: Apertura: Miguel Sabah (9); Clausura: Héctor Mancilla (12); All: Héctor Mancilla (13)
- Highest home attendance: Apertura: 27,614 vs América (November 14, 2012); Clausura: 30,762 vs América (March 8, 2013)
- Lowest home attendance: Apertura: 10,589 vs Chiapas (October 4, 2012); Clausura: 10,667 vs Pachuca (February 22, 2013)
Home colours	Away colours

The 2012–13 Morelia season was the 66th professional season of Mexico's top-flight football league. The season is split into two tournaments—the Torneo Apertura and the Torneo Clausura—each with identical formats and each contested by the same eighteen teams. Morelia began their season on July 21, 2012, against Cruz Azul, Morelia played most of their homes games on Fridays at 9:30 local time. Morelia was eliminated in the quarter-finals by América and Cruz Azul in the Apertura and Clausura tournaments respectively.

== Torneo Apertura ==
=== Squad ===
Note: Flags indicate national team as defined under FIFA eligibility rules; some limited exceptions apply. Players may hold more than one non-FIFA nationality.

No.	Pos.	Nation	Player
1	GK	MEX	Carlos Felipe Rodríguez
2	DF	MEX	Enrique Pérez
3	GK	ARG	Federico Vilar (captain)
4	MF	MEX	Uriel Álvarez (on loan from Santos Laguna)
5	DF	ARG	Mauricio Romero
6	DF	MEX	Joel Huiqui
7	FW	ECU	Jefferson Montero
8	MF	COL	Aldo Ramírez
9	FW	MEX	Miguel Sabah
10	FW	ECU	Joao Rojas
11	FW	MEX	Carlos Ochoa (on loan from Santos Laguna)
12	GK	MEX	Higinio Bucio
13	DF	MEX	Fernando Salazar
14	DF	MEX	Luis Fernando Silva
15	DF	MEX	Óscar Razo (on loan from Chiapas)
16	MF	MEX	Victor Martínez
17	DF	MEX	Hibert Ruiz

No.	Pos.	Nation	Player
18	FW	MEX	Edson Juárez
19	DF	MEX	José Antonio Olvera
20	FW	MEX	Ángel Sepúlveda
22	MF	MEX	Francisco Torres (on loan from Santos Laguna)
23	MF	MEX	Daniel Silva
24	MF	MEX	Luis Romero
26	MF	MEX	Christian Valdéz (on loan from Chiapas)
27	FW	MEX	Antonio Pedroza (on loan from Crystal Palace)
28	MF	MEX	Carlos Adrián Morales
29	MF	MEX	Rodrigo Salinas (on loan from Puebla)
70	DF	MEX	Carlos Guzmán
76	DF	MEX	Rodrigo Godinez
77	FW	MEX	Humberto Guzmán
80	MF	MEX	Alejandro Barrera
83	GK	MEX	Guillermo Pozos
84	FW	MEX	Jesús Rivera
87	DF	MEX	Daniel Torres

=== Regular season ===
Win Draw Loss

==== Apertura 2012 results ====
July 21, 2012 Round 1	Cruz Azul	0 – 0	Morelia	Mexico City
17:00	Perea (yellow card) 16'; A. Castro (yellow card) 62'; Maranhão (yellow card) 79'	Report	Romero (yellow card) 29'	Stadium: Estadio Azul; Referee: Luis Enrique Santander

July 27, 2012 Round 2	Morelia	1 – 0	Monterrey	Morelia, Michoacán
19:30	Romero (yellow card) 17'; Sabah 24', (yellow card) 89'; Salinas (yellow card) 54'; Morales (yellow card) 90'	Report	Morales (yellow card) 16'; Ayoví (yellow card) 72'; Meza (yellow card) 90'	Stadium: Estadio Morelos; Referee: Miguel Ángel Chacón

August 3, 2012 Round 3	Morelia	3 – 3	San Luis	Morelia, Michoacán
21:30	Huiqui 9', 88', (yellow card) 39'; Morales (yellow card) 28'; Ramírez (yellow card) 38'; Pedroza 85'	Report	Velasco (yellow card) 37'; Cadavid (yellow card) 39'; Fernández 45', 52' (pen.), (yellow card) 47'; Tréllez 65'	Stadium: Estadio Morelos; Attendance: 11,962; Referee: Ricardo Arellano

August 12, 2012 Round 4	Guadalajara	1 – 1	Morelia	Zapopan, Jalisco
18:00	Sánchez (yellow card) 45'; Márquez (red card) 70'; Báez 81'	Report	Romero 34'; Huiqui (yellow card) 38'; Romano (red card) 40' (manager)	Stadium: Estadio Omnilife; Referee: José Alfredo Peñaloza

August 17, 2012 Round 5	Morelia	3 – 0	Puebla	Morelia, Michoacán
21:30	Rojas 44'; Morales 45+'; Sabah 77'; Huiqui (yellow card) 81'	Report	Gastélum (yellow card) 45+'; Polo (yellow card) 75'	Stadium: Estadio Morelos; Attendance: 11,659; Referee: Roberto García Orozco

August 24, 2012 Round 6	León	1 – 3	Morelia	León, Guanajuato
20:30	Loboa (yellow card) 46'; Britos 48'; Magallón (yellow card) 86'	Report	Rojas 17', 78', (yellow card) 79'; Huiqui 26'; Pérez (yellow card) 39'; Ramírez (yellow card) 39'; Álvarez (yellow card) 50' (yellow-red card) 60'	Stadium: Estadio León; Attendance: 23,402; Referee: Jorge Isaac Rojas

August 31, 2012 Round 7	Morelia	0 – 1	UNAM	Morelia, Michoacán
21:30	Vilar (yellow card) 69'	Report	Cortés (yellow card) 32'; Villa 70'; Luis García (yellow card) 85'	Stadium: Estadio Morelos; Attendance: 18,547; Referee: Jorge Antonio Pérez

September 14, 2012 Round 8	Pachuca	3 – 2	Morelia	Pachuca, Hidalgo
19:30	Borja 14', 25'; Torres 57'; Cota (yellow card) 87'	Report	López 35' (o.g.); Ruiz (yellow card) 50'; Álvarez (yellow card) 56'; Ochoa 74'	Stadium: Estadio Hidalgo; Attendance: 12,934; Referee: Erim Ramírez

September 21, 2012 Round 9	Morelia	1 – 1	UANL	Morelia, Michoacán
21:30	Huiqui (yellow card) 42'; Ramírez (yellow card) 64'; Rojas (yellow card) 69'; Ochoa 72'	Report	Luis García (yellow card) 39'; Hernández (yellow card) 45+'; Lobos 65' (pen.)	Stadium: Estadio Morelos; Attendance: 13,601; Referee: Fernando Guerrero

September 29, 2012 Round 10	América	1 – 1	Morelia	Mexico City
17:00	Mosquera (yellow card) 29'; Sambueza (yellow card) 39'; Jiménez 74'	Report	Morales 67'; Salinas (yellow card) 82' (yellow-red card) 89'	Stadium: Estadio Azteca; Attendance: 16,305; Referee: Francisco Chacón

October 4, 2012 Round 11	Morelia	1 – 1	Chiapas	Morelia, Michoacán
20:00	Montero 35'; Ramírez (yellow card) 37'; Álvarez (yellow card) 45+1'; Romero (yellow card) 49'; Olvera (yellow card) 69'	Report	Andrade 34'; Martínez (yellow card) 53'; Esqueda (yellow card) 75'	Stadium: Estadio Morelos; Attendance: 10,589; Referee: Óscar Macías

October 7, 2012 Round 12	Atlante	2 – 2	Morelia	Cancún, Quintana Roo
18:00	Venegas 3', 17'; Nápoles (yellow card) 42'; Guagua (yellow card) 44'; Fonseca (yellow card) 66'; Calvo (yellow card) 76'	Report	Ramírez (yellow card) 15'; Montero (yellow card) 44'; Valdez (yellow card) 54'; Morales (yellow card) 61'; Rojas (yellow card) 74'; Sabah 82', 85'; Huiqui (yellow card) 90'	Stadium: Estadio Andrés Quintana Roo; Attendance: 4,804; Referee: Roberto García Orozco

October 23, 2012 Round 13	Morelia	2 – 0	Atlas	Morelia, Michoacán
20:30	Rojas 31'; Torres 73'; Ramírez (yellow card) 90+2'	Report	Rodríguez (yellow card) 35'; Mancilla (yellow card) 63'; Barraza (yellow card) 68'; Vigón (red card) 77'; Boy (red card) 90+2' (manager)	Stadium: Estadio Morelos; Attendance: 13,223; Referee: Marco Antonio Rodríguez

October 20, 2012 Round 14	Querétaro	1 – 2	Morelia	Querétaro, Querétaro
17:00	García Arias (yellow card) 34'; Rippa (yellow card) 50'; Vera 55', (yellow card) 78'; García (yellow card) 90+2'	Report	Huqui (yellow card) 14'; Torres (yellow card) 28'; Sabah (yellow card) 49' (yellow-red card) 90+3', (goal) 90+3'; Rojas 51', (yellow card) 62'	Stadium: Estadio Corregidora; Referee: Fernando Guerrero

October 27, 2012 Round 15	Morelia	1 – 1	Tijuana	Morelia, Michoacán
19:00	Sabah 21' (pen.); Ramírez (yellow card) 39'; Salinas (yellow card) 46'; Valdéz (yellow card) 52'; Montero (yellow card) 66'	Report	Riascos 9'; Aguilar (yellow card) 20'; Gandolfi (yellow card) 26'; Perllerano (yellow card) 37'; Arce (yellow card) 52'	Stadium: Estadio Morelos; Attendance: 17,138; Referee: Ricardo Arellano

November 4, 2012 Round 16	Toluca	0 – 0	Morelia	Toluca, Estado de Mexico
12:00	Sinha (yellow card) 29'; Cacho (yellow card) 63'; Dueñas (yellow card) 70'	Report	Valdéz (yellow card) 27'; Álvarez (yellow card) 31'; Romero (yellow card) 33'; Montero (yellow card) 69'	Stadium: Estadio Nemesio Díez; Attendance: 10,732; Referee: Miguel Ángel Ayala

November 9, 2012 Round 17	Morelia	2 – 0	Santos Laguna	Morelia, Michoacán
21:30	Huiqui (yellow card) 14'; Sabah 18', 66', (yellow card) 21'; Rojas (yellow card) 51'; Salinas (yellow card) 62'	Report	Baloy (yellow card) 3'; Peralta (yellow card) 8'; Sánchez (yellow card) 51'; Rodríguez (yellow card) 72'	Stadium: Estadio Morelos; Attendance: 18,879; Referee: Marco Antonio Rodríguez

==== Final phase ====
November 14, 2012 Quarter-finals	Morelia	0 – 2	América	Morelia, Michoacán
21:00	Álvarez (yellow card) 62'; Romero (red card) 81'	Report	Cárdenas (yellow card) 53'; Benítez 57', 75'	Stadium: Estadio Morelos; Attendance: 27,614; Referee: Jorge Antonio Pérez

November 17, 2012 Quarter-finals	América	1 – 2	Morelia	Coyoacán, Mexico City
17:00	Jiménez 38'; Benítez (yellow card) 61'; Valenzuela (yellow card) 82'	Report	Rojas 1'; Sabah 41'; Valdéz (yellow card) 44'; Ramírez (yellow card) 55'	Stadium: Estadio Azteca; Attendance: 40,633; Referee: Francisco Chacón

América advanced 3–2 on aggregate

=== Goalscorers ===
==== Regular season ====
Position	Nation	Name	Goals scored
1.	(Mexico)	Miguel Sabah	8
2.	(Ecuador)	Joao Rojas	5
3.	(Mexico)	Joel Huiqui	3
4.	(Mexico)	Carlos Adrián Morales	2
4.	(Mexico)	Carlos Ochoa	2
6.	(Ecuador)	Jefferson Montero	1
6.	(Mexico)	Antonio Pedroza	1
6.	(Argentina)	Mauricio Martín Romero	1
6.	(Mexico)	Francisco Torres	1
6.	(Mexico)	Own Goals	1
TOTAL			25

==== Final phase ====
Position	Nation	Name	Goals scored
1.	(Ecuador)	Joao Rojas	1
1.	(Mexico)	Miguel Sabah	1
TOTAL			2

=== Results ===
==== Results summary ====
Overall								Home						Away					
Pld	W	D	L	GF	GA	GD	Pts	W	D	L	GF	GA	GD	W	D	L	GF	GA	GD
17	6	9	2	25	16	+9	27	4	4	1	14	7	+7	2	5	1	11	9	+2

Last updated: 10 November 2012.
Source: Apertura 2012 results

==== Results by round ====
Round	1	2	3	4	5	6	7	8	9	10	11	12	13	14	15	16	17
Ground	A	H	H	A	H	A	H	A	H	A	H	A	H	A	H	A	H
Result	D	W	D	D	W	W	L	L	D	D	D	D	W	W	D	D	W
Position	9	8	8	9	5	3	5	8	8	7	8	9	10	8	6	6	5

Updated to match(es) played on 10 November 2012. Source: Apertura 2012 results and mediotiempo.com
A = Away; H = Home; W = Win; D = Draw; L = Loss

== Apertura 2012 Copa MX ==
=== Group stage ===
Win Draw Loss

==== Apertura results ====
July 24, 2012 1	Morelia	1 – 1	Estudiantes Tecos	Morelia, Michoacán
19:00	Ochoa (yellow card) 37', (goal) 55' (pen.); Martínez (yellow card) 88'	Report	Barrera (yellow card) 26'; Ramírez (yellow card) 37'; Quintero (yellow card) 54'; Lillingston 57'	Stadium: Estadio Morelos; Referee: Óscar Macías

July 31, 2012 2	Estudiantes Tecos	0 – 3	Morelia	Zapopan, Jalisco
21:00		Report	Sepúlveda 5'; Martínez (yellow card) 65'; Pedroza 72', 87'; Barrera (yellow card) 73'; Rodríguez (yellow card) 80'; Godinez (yellow card) 90'	Stadium: Estadio Tres de Marzo; Referee: Óscar Villagómez

August 7, 2012 3	Dorados	3 – 2	Morelia	Culiacán, Sinaloa
20:00	López (yellow card) 23'; Ramírez 40'; Escuedro (yellow card) 45+'; Mena (yellow card) 54', (goal) 60'; Blanco (yellow card) 73'; Velázquez (yellow card) 90'; Hernández 90'	Report	Álvarez (yellow card) 39' (yellow-red card) 62'; Montero 51'; Torres (yellow card) 52' (yellow-red card) 72'; Rojas 54'	Stadium: Estadio Banorte; Attendance: 5,895; Referee: Óscar Villagómez

August 21, 2012 4	Morelia	6 – 0	Dorados	Morelia, Michoacán
21:00	Pedroza 15', 60'; Ochoa 25'; Godinez (yellow card) 32'; Silva (yellow card) 40'; Montero 69', 70', 80'; Salazar (yellow card) 76'	Report	Osuna (yellow card) 24'; Mena (yellow card) 55'	Stadium: Estadio Morelos; Referee: Óscar Macías Romo

August 28, 2012 5	León	2 – 2	Morelia	León, Guanajuato
17:00	Arce 29'; Britos 43'; Mascorro (yellow card) 50'; Calderón (yellow card) 63'	Report	Pedroza (yellow card) 43'; Rojas 47'; Sepúlveda 62'; Godinez (yellow card) 65'	Stadium: Estadio León; Attendance: 19,980; Referee: Miguel Ángel Chacón

September 18, 2012 6	Morelia	0 – 0	León	Morelia, Michoacán
21:00	Torres (yellow card) 54'; Silva (yellow card) 57'	Report	Calderón (red card) 20'; Ortiz (yellow card) 45'	Stadium: Estadio Morelos; Attendance: 8,109; Referee: Jorge Antonio Pérez

=== Goalscorers ===
Position	Nation	Name	Goals scored
1.	(Ecuador)	Jefferson Montero	4
1.	(Mexico)	Antonio Pedroza	4
3.	(Mexico)	Carlos Ochoa	2
3.	(Ecuador)	Joao Rojas	2
3.	(Mexico)	Ángel Sepúlveda	2
TOTAL			14

=== Results ===
==== Results by round ====
Round	1	2	3	4	5	6
Ground	H	A	A	H	A	H
Result	D	W	L	W	D	D
Position	2	1	3	1	1	2

Updated to match(es) played on 18 September 2012. Source: Apertura results and mediotiempo.com
A = Away; H = Home; W = Win; D = Draw; L = Loss

== Torneo Clausura ==
=== Squad ===
Note: Flags indicate national team as defined under FIFA eligibility rules; some limited exceptions apply. Players may hold more than one non-FIFA nationality.

No.	Pos.	Nation	Player
1	GK	MEX	Carlos Felipe Rodríguez
2	DF	MEX	Enrique Pérez
3	GK	ARG	Federico Vilar (captain)
4	DF	MEX	Uriel Álvarez (on loan from Santos Laguna)
6	DF	MEX	Joel Huiqui
7	FW	ECU	Jefferson Montero
8	MF	COL	Aldo Ramírez
9	FW	CHI	Héctor Mancilla
10	FW	ECU	Joao Rojas
11	FW	MEX	Carlos Ochoa (on loan from Santos Laguna)
12	GK	MEX	Higinio Bucio
13	DF	MEX	Fernando Salazar
14	DF	MEX	Luis Fernando Silva
15	MF	MEX	Fernando Morales
16	MF	MEX	Victor Martínez
17	MF	MEX	Hibert Ruiz

No.	Pos.	Nation	Player
18	FW	MEX	Edson Juárez
19	DF	MEX	José Antonio Olvera
20	MF	MEX	José María Cárdenas (on loan from América)
21	FW	MEX	Sergio Santana
22	MF	MEX	Francisco Torres (on loan from Santos Laguna)
23	MF	MEX	Daniel Silva
24	MF	MEX	Luis Romero
26	MF	MEX	Christian Valdéz
27	FW	MEX	Antonio Pedroza
28	MF	MEX	Carlos Adrián Morales
29	MF	MEX	Rodrigo Salinas (on loan from Puebla)
72	MF	MEX	Alejandro Barrera
76	DF	MEX	Rodrigo Godinez
77	FW	MEX	Humberto Guzmán
87	DF	MEX	Gerardo Torres

=== Regular season ===
Win Draw Loss

==== Clausura 2013 results ====
January 4, 2013 Round 1	Morelia	3 – 3	Cruz Azul	Morelia, Michoacán
19:30	Montero 2', (yellow card) 51'; Mancilla 28'; Cárdenas (yellow card) 38'; Ramírez (yellow card) 64'; Huqiui (yellow card) 72'; Salinas 73' (pen.), (yellow card) 74'	Report	Orozco 24', 59'; Perea 44'; Domínguez (yellow card) 62'; Giménez (yellow card) 69'; Vela (yellow card) 72' (yellow-red card) 89'; Torrado (yellow card) 90+1'	Stadium: Estadio Morelos; Attendance: 25,741; Referee: Erim Ramírez

January 12, 2013 Round 2	Monterrey	1 – 0	Morelia	Monterrey, Nuevo León
19:00	Cardozo 7'; Basanta (yellow card) 45'	Report	Mancilla (red card) 44'; Álvarez (yellow card) 87'	Stadium: Estadio Tecnológico; Attendance: 36,000; Referee: Francisco Chacón

January 19, 2013 Round 3	San Luis	1 – 2	Morelia	San Luis Potosí, San Luis Potosí
21:00	Velasco 20'; Rincón (yellow card) 31'; Jiménez (yellow card) 54'	Report	Torres (yellow card) 1'; Huiqui (yellow card) 19' (yellow-red card) 29'; Santana (yellow card) 30'; Pérez 39'; Salinas 55' (pen.)	Stadium: Estadio Alfonso Lastras; Referee: Miguel Ángel Flores

January 25, 2013 Round 4	Morelia	1 – 1	Guadalajara	Morelia, Michoacán
19:30	Álvarez (yellow card) 9'; Rojas (yellow card) 25', (goal) 89'	Report	Sabah (yellow card) 9'; Márquez 52', (yellow card) 87'; Álvarez (red card) 56'; Fabián (yellow card) 57'; Morales (yellow card) 82'	Stadium: Estadio Morelos; Attendance: 26,408; Referee: Paul Delgadillo

February 3, 2013 Round 5	Puebla	3 – 1	Morelia	Puebla, Puebla
12:00	Huiqui 15' (o.g.); Noriega (yellow card) 19'; Borja 26'; Lacerda (yellow card) 44'; Alustiza 90+3', (yellow card) 90+3'	Report	Mancilla 21', (red card) 90+4'; Ramírez (yellow card) 28'; Rojas (yellow card) 65'; Pérez (yellow card) 79'; Morales (red card) 88'	Stadium: Estadio Cuauhtémoc; Attendance: 26,000; Referee: Marco Antonio Rodríguez

February 8, 2013 Round 6	Morelia	1 – 0	León	Morelia, Michoacán
19:30	Santana 54' (pen.), (yellow card) 88'; Huiqui (yellow card) 72'; Álvarez (red card) 90+2'	Report	González (red card) 58'; Márquez (yellow card) 58'	Stadium: Estadio Morelos; Attendance: 16,530; Referee: Roberto García Orozco

February 17, 2013 Round 7	UNAM	1 – 0	Morelia	Coyoacán, Mexico City
12:00	Velarde 65'; M. Palacios (yellow card) 90+2'	Report	Rojas (yellow card) 49'; Cárdenas (yellow card) 87'	Stadium: Estadio Olímpico Universitario; Attendance: 16,212; Referee: César Arturo Ramos

February 22, 2013 Round 8	Morelia	3 – 2	Pachuca	Morelia, Michoacán
19:30	Montero 7'; Salinas (yellow card) 20'; Mancilla 34', 70' (pen.); Valdez (yellow card) 54'	Report	Arreola (yellow card) 18'; Carreño 21'; Navarro (yellow card) 33'; Reyna (yellow card) 52', (goal) 80'; Hernández (yellow card) 82'; Suárez (yellow card) 87'	Stadium: Estadio Morelos; Attendance: 10,667; Referee: Miguel Ángel Ayala

March 2, 2013 Round 9	UANL	1 – 1	Morelia	San Nicolás de los Garza, Nuevo León
19:00	Lobos 27'	Report	Huiqui (yellow card) 9'; Morales (yellow card) 66'; Ochoa 90+4'	Stadium: Estadio Universitario; Referee: Francisco Chacón

March 8, 2013 Round 10	Morelia	1 – 1	América	Morelia, Michoacán
19:30	Mancilla 1'; Vilar (red card) 35'; Salinas (yellow card) 38'; Ramírez (yellow card) 74'	Report	Benítez 29'	Stadium: Estadio Morelos; Attendance: 30,762; Referee: Paul Delgadillo

March 15, 2013 Round 11	Chiapas	1 – 1	Morelia	Tuxtla Gutiérrez, Chiapas
19:30	Gastélum (yellow card) 39'; Rey 44' (pen.); Toledo (red card) 80'	Report	Rojas 10'; Rodríguez (yellow card) 41'	Stadium: Estadio Victor Manuel Reyna; Attendance: 7,752; Referee: José Alfredo Peñaloza

March 30, 2013 Round 12	Morelia	4 – 0	Atlante	Morelia, Michoacán
19:00	Martínez 4' (o.g.); Mancilla 20'; Pérez (yellow card) 24'; Huiqui (yellow card) 45+1'; Valdez (yellow card) 74'; Ochoa 85', 90+1'	Report	García (yellow card) 37'; Paredes (yellow card) 56'; Venegas (yellow card) 76'	Stadium: Estadio Morelos; Attendance: 10,896; Referee: Óscar Macias

April 6, 2013 Round 13	Atlas	0 – 0	Morelia	Guadalajara, Jalisco
21:00	Vuoso (yellow card) 61'	Report	Huiqui (yellow card) 21'; Valdez (yellow card) 36'	Stadium: Estadio Jalisco; Attendance: 33,378; Referee: Erim Ramírez

April 12, 2013 Round 14	Morelia	1 – 0	Querétaro	Morelia, Michoacán
21:30	Mancilla 77'	Report	Pineda (yellow card) 8'	Stadium: Estadio Morelos; Attendance: 13,016; Referee: Roberto García Orozco

April 20, 2013 Round 15	Tijuana	1 – 2	Morelia	Tijuana, Baja California
17:00	Márquez 34'; Riascos (yellow card) 53'; Martínez (yellow card) 54'; Arce (yellow card) 61'; Núñez (yellow card) 83'; Corona (red card) 88'; Castillo (yellow card) 90+1' (yellow-red card) 90+1'	Report	Salinas (yellow card) 4'; Mancilla (yellow card) 44', (goal) 73', 75'; Pérez (yellow card) 54'	Stadium: Estadio Caliente; Attendance: 23,133; Referee: Jorge Antonio Pérez

April 26, 2013 Round 16	Morelia	2 – 1	Toluca	Morelia, Michoacán
19:30	Montero 36'; Mancilla 67'; Ramírez (yellow card) 89'; Ruiz (yellow card) 90+1'	Report	Ríos (yellow card) 31'; Rodríguez 58'; Sinha (yellow card) 90'	Stadium: Estadio Morelos; Attendance: 15,759; Referee: César Arturo Ramos

May 4, 2013 Round 17	Santos Laguna	1 – 2	Morelia	Torreón, Coahuila
19:00	Baloy (yellow card) 24'; Figueroa (yellow card) 45'; Quintero 61'; Sánchez (yellow card) 78'	Report	Mancilla 36'; Rojas 42'; Torres (yellow card) 75'	Stadium: Estadio Corona; Attendance: 24,639; Referee: José Alfredo Peñaloza

=== Final phase ===
May 9, 2013 Quarter-finals	Cruz Azul	4 – 2	Morelia	Benito Juárez, Mexico City
21:00	Pavone 24', 90+8', (yellow card) 26'; A. Castro (yellow card) 46'; T. Gutiérrez (yellow card) 51', (goal) 53'; Giménez 59', (yellow card) 90+15'; Torrado (yellow card) 90+22'	Report	Mancilla 2'; Vilar (yellow card) 23'; Ochoa 90+18'	Stadium: Estadio Azul; Attendance: 25,570; Referee: Jorge Isaac Rojas

May 12, 2013 Quarter-finals	Morelia	1 – 0	Cruz Azul	Morelia, Michoacán
18:00	Montero (yellow card) 40'; Salinas 44'; Ramírez (yellow card) 52'	Report	Giménez (yellow card) 42'	Stadium: Estadio Morelos; Attendance: 28,048; Referee: Paul Delgadillo

Cruz Azul advanced 4–3 on aggregate

=== Goalscorers ===
==== Regular season ====
Position	Nation	Name	Goals scored
1.	(Chile)	Héctor Mancilla	11
2.	(Ecuador)	Jefferson Montero	3
2.	(Ecuador)	Joao Rojas	3
2.	(Mexico)	Carlos Ochoa	3
5.	(Mexico)	Rodrigo Salinas	2
6.	(Mexico)	Enrique Pérez	1
6.	(Mexico)	Sergio Santana	1
6.		Own Goals	1
TOTAL			25

==== Final phase ====
Position	Nation	Name	Goals scored
1.	(Chile)	Héctor Mancilla	1
1.	(Mexico)	Carlos Ochoa	1
1.	(Mexico)	Rodrigo Salinas	1
TOTAL			3

=== Results ===
==== Results summary ====
Overall								Home						Away					
Pld	W	D	L	GF	GA	GD	Pts	W	D	L	GF	GA	GD	W	D	L	GF	GA	GD
17	8	6	3	25	18	+7	30	5	3	0	16	8	+8	3	3	3	9	10	−1

Last updated: 4 May 2013.
Source: Clausura 2013 results

==== Results by round ====
Round	1	2	3	4	5	6	7	8	9	10	11	12	13	14	15	16	17
Ground	H	A	A	H	A	H	A	H	A	H	A	H	A	H	A	H	A
Result	D	L	W	D	L	W	L	W	D	D	D	W	D	W	W	W	W
Position	6	11	9	8	13	9	11	9	10	12	12	7	8	6	5	5	4

Updated to match(es) played on 4 May 2013. Source: Clausura 2013 results and mediotiempo.com
A = Away; H = Home; W = Win; D = Draw; L = Loss

== Clausura 2013 Copa MX ==
=== Group stage ===
Win Draw Loss

==== Clausura results ====
January 16, 2013 1	Morelia	1 – 1	Veracruz	Morelia, Michoacán
21:00	Mancilla (yellow card) 42', (goal) 50'; Barrera (yellow card) 65'; Sato (yellow card) 72'	Report	Manrique (yellow card) 34'; Ocaña (yellow card) 71', (goal) 85'	Stadium: Estadio Morelos; Attendance: 8,561; Referee: Oscar Macías Romo

January 22, 2013 2	Veracruz	2 – 1	Morelia	Veracruz, Veracruz
21:00	Olguín (yellow card) 11'; Ocaña (yellow card) 11', (goal) 12'; Marrufo (yellow card) 16'; Lozano 68' (o.g.); Domínguez (yellow card) 82'	Report	Hernández (red card) 1'; Ochoa (yellow card) 28'; Morales (yellow card) 37'; Sato 44'; Guajardo (yellow card) 60'; Huiqui (yellow card) 83'	Stadium: Estadio Luis Pirata Fuente; Referee: Eduardo Galván Basulto

February 14, 2013 3	Estudiantes Tecos	1 – 1	Morelia	Zapopan, Jalisco
21:00	Velázquez (yellow card) 11'; Alfaro 32'; Sánchez (yellow card) 36'	Report	Guzmán (yellow card) 40'; Morales (yellow card) 42'; Valdez 49'; Morales (yellow card) 81'	Stadium: Estadio Tres de Marzo; Referee: Quetzalli Alvarado

February 19, 2013 4	Morelia	1 – 3	Estudiantes Tecos	Morelia, Michoacán
19:00	Rojas (yellow card) 50'; Godinez (yellow card) 59'; Ruiz 69'	Report	Mejía 24', (yellow card) 64'; Godinez 29' (o.g.); Ruiz 59'	Stadium: Estadio Morelos; Referee: Miguel Ángel Ortega

February 26, 2013 5	Querétaro	1 – 1	Morelia	Querétaro, Querétaro
21:00	Gabas (yellow card) 39'; Oviedo 63'	Report	Sato (yellow card) 14'; Morales (yellow card) 30'; Guerrero (yellow card) 71'; Torres 72'	Stadium: Estadio Corregidora; Referee: Miguel Ángel Chacón

March 5, 2013 6	Morelia	0 – 0	Querétaro	Morelia, Michoacán
21:00	Silva (yellow card) 60'; Ruiz (yellow card) 62'; Santana (yellow card) 76'	Report	Gabas (yellow card) 38'; López (yellow card) 59'; Pineda (yellow card) 76'; Oviedo (yellow card) 77'	Stadium: Estadio Morelos; Referee: César Arturo Ramos

=== Goalscorers ===
Position	Nation	Name	Goals scored
1.	(Chile)	Héctor Mancilla	1
1.	(Mexico)	Hibert Ruiz	1
1.	(Japan)	Reiji Sato	1
1.	(Mexico)	Francisco Javier Torres	1
1.	(Mexico)	Christian Valdez	1
TOTAL			5

=== Results ===
==== Results by round ====
Round	1	2	3	4	5	6
Ground	H	A	A	H	A	H
Result	D	L	D	L	D	D
Position	2	4	4	4	4	4

Updated to match(es) played on 5 March 2013. Source: Clausura results and mediotiempo.com
A = Away; H = Home; W = Win; D = Draw; L = Loss
