= 2010–11 Monarcas Morelia season =

Morelia
2010–11 season
- Chairman: Álvaro Dávila
- Manager: Tomás Boy
- Ground: Estadio Morelos
- Primera División: 11
- SuperLiga: Winners
- Top goalscorer: League: Miguel Sabah (11), Rafael Márquez (11); All: Miguel Sabah (15)
Home colours	Away colours

The 2010–11 Morelia season was the 64th professional season of Mexico's top-flight football league. The season is split into 2 tournaments—the Torneo Apertura and the Torneo Clausura—each with identical formats and each contested by the same eighteen teams. Morelia began their season on July 25, 2010 defeating Atlas 1–0, Morelia played their homes games on Sundays at noon local time.

== Torneo Apertura ==
=== Squad ===
As of June 14, 2010.

Note: Flags indicate national team as defined under FIFA eligibility rules; some limited exceptions apply. Players may hold more than one non-FIFA nationality.

No.	Pos.	Nation	Player
1	GK	MEX	Carlos Rodríguez
2	DF	MEX	Enrique Pérez
3	GK	ITA	Federico Vilar
4	DF	MEX	Luis Fernando Silva
5	DF	MEX	Adrián García Arias (on loan from San Luis)
6	MF	MEX	Ismael Pineda
7	FW	MEX	Rafael Márquez Lugo (on loan from Atlante)
8	MF	MEX	Jorge Gastelum
9	FW	MEX	Miguel Sabah (vice-captain)
11	MF	CHI	Hugo Droguett
12	GK	MEX	Yair Urbina
13	DF	MEX	Fernando Salazar
14	MF	MEX	Luis Miguel Noriega

No.	Pos.	Nation	Player
15	DF	MEX	Francisco Javier Dorame
16	MF	MEX	Adrián Aldrete
17	MF	MEX	Rodolfo Vilchis
18	FW	COL	Luis Gabriel Rey
19	FW	MEX	Miguel Ángel Sansores
20	MF	MEX	Ángel Supúlveda
21	MF	MEX	Jaime Lozano (on loan from Cruz Azul)
24	DF	MEX	José Manuel Cruzalta (on loan from Toluca)
26	DF	ARG	Mauricio Romero (captain)
36	MF	MEX	Mario Antonio Moreno
77	FW	MEX	Elías Hernández
81	MF	COL	Aldo Ramírez
100	GK	MEX	Alonso Arciga

=== Regular season ===
July 25, 2010 Round 1	Morelia	1–0	Atlas	Estadio Morelos, Morelia
12:00pm	Rey 69'	Report		Referee: Mauricio Morales

October 6, 2010 Round 2	Guadalajara	0–1	Morelia	Estadio Omnilife, Zapopan
8:45		Report	Aldrete 78'	Referee: Rafael Medina

August 8, 2010 Round 3	Morelia	6–0	Querétaro	Estadio Morelos, Morelia
12:00pm	Sabah 7', 24', 54' (pen.); Hernández 36'; Rey 41' (pen.); Márquez Lugo 85'	Report		Referee: Paul Delgadillo

August 14, 2010 Round 4	San Luis	1–0	Morelia	Estadio Alfonso Lastras, San Luis Potosí
8:45pm	Aguirre 57'	Report		Referee: Erim Ramírez

August 22, 2010 Round 5	Morelia	1–0	Necaxa	Estadio Morelos, Morelia
12:00pm	Márquez Lugo 75'	Report		Referee: Francisco Chacón

August 27, 2010 Round 6	Estudiantes Tecos	1–1	Morelia	Estadio Tres de Marzo, Zapopan
8:10pm	Rangel 49'	Report	Lozano 89'	Referee: Marco Antonio Rodríguez

September 12, 2010 Round 7	Morelia	0–2	América	Estadio Morelos, Morelia
12:00pm		Report	Vuoso 5'; Layún 58'	Referee: Ricardo Arellano

September 18, 2010 Round 8	Atlante	2–0	Morelia	Estadio Andrés Quintana Roo, Cancún
9:00pm	Carevic 63'; Fano 82'	Report		Referee: Jorge Eduardo Gasso

September 26, 2010 Round 9	Morelia	1–2	Toluca	Estadio Morelos, Morelia
8:00pm	Droguett 54'	Report	Mancilla 51'; Calderón 62'	Referee: Miguel Ángel Ayala

October 2, 2010 Round 10	UNAM	1–0	Morelia	Estadio Olímpico Universitario, Mexico City
12:00pm	López 63'	Report		Referee: José Alfredo Peñaloza

October 10, 2010 Round 11	Morelia	0–0	Santos Laguna	Estadio Morelos, Morelia
12:00pm		Report		Referee: Paul Delgadillo

October 16, 2010 Round 12	Pachuca	1–1	Morelia	Estadio Hidalgo, Pachuca
7:00pm	Peña 11'	Report	Sabah 59'	Referee: Francisco Chacón

October 24, 2010 Round 13	Morelia	1–1	Cruz Azul	Estadio Morelos, Morelia
12:00pm	Sabah 88'	Report	Aquino 73'	Referee: Jaime Herrera

October 27, 2010 Round 14	Chiapas	0–0	Morelia	Estadio Victor Manuel Reyna, Tuxtla Gutierrez
8:00pm		Report		Referee: Fabricio Morales

October 31, 2010 Round 15	Morelia	0–2	Monterrey	Estadio Morelos, Morelia
12:00pm		Report	Carreño 32'; Cardozo 89'	Referee: Ricardo Arellano

November 6, 2010 Round 16	UANL	0–1	Morelia	Estadio Universitario, San Nicolás
7:00pm		Report	Dorame 72'	Referee: Armando Archundia

November 14, 2010 Round 17	Morelia	3–3	Puebla	Estadio Morelos, Morelia
12:00pm	Droguett 2'; Sabah 48', 79'	Report	Pereyra 8'; Ortiz 31'; Olivera 86'	Referee: Mauricio Morales

=== North American SuperLiga ===
==== Group stage ====
July 14, 2010	Chicago	1–5	Morelia	Toyota Park, Bridgeview
8:30PM	Kinney 49'	Report	Hernández 4'; Rey 34'; Sabah 40'; Márquez 50'; Lozano 70'	Attendance: 11,009; Referee: José Rivera (El Salvador)

July 17, 2010	Morelia	2–2	UNAM	Toyota Park, Bridgeview
8:30pm	Rey 2'; Droguett 53'	Report	Augusto 68'; Cortés 85'	Attendance: 16,117; Referee: Ricardo Arellano (Mexico)

July 20, 2010	New England	1–0	Morelia	Gillette Stadium, Foxborough
8:00pm	Perović 62'	Report		Attendance: 8,173; Referee: Elmer Rodas (Guatemala)

==== Semi-final ====
August 5, 2010	Houston Dynamo	0–1	Morelia	Robertson Stadium, Houston
7:00pm		Report	Sabah 47'	Attendance: 7,641; Referee: Walter Quesada (Costa Rica)

==== Final ====
September 1, 2010	New England	1–2	Morelia	Gillette Stadium, Foxborough
7:00pm	Alston 79'	Report	Sabah 65' (pen.), 75'	Attendance: 10,414; Referee: Carlos Batres (Guatemala)

=== Goalscorers ===
Position	Nation	Name	Goals scored
1.	(Mexico)	Miguel Sabah	7
2.	(Chile)	Hugo Droguett	2
2.	(Mexico)	Rafael Márquez Lugo	2
2.	(Colombia)	Luis Gabriel Rey	2
3.	(Mexico)	Adrián Aldrete	1
3.	(Mexico)	Francisco Javier Dorame	1
3.	(Mexico)	Elías Hernández	1
3.	(Mexico)	Jaime Lozano	1
TOTAL			17

=== Transfers ===
==== In ====
#	Pos	Player	From
3	GK	(Argentina) Federico Vilar	(Mexico) Atlante
5	DF	(Mexico) Adrián García Arias (on loan)	(Mexico) San Luis
7	FW	(Mexico) Rafael Márquez Lugo (on loan)	(Mexico) Atlante
12	GK	(Mexico) Yair Urbina	(Mexico) León
14	MF	(Mexico) Luis Miguel Noriega	(Mexico) Puebla
21	MF	(Mexico) Jaime Lozano (on loan)	(Mexico) Cruz Azul
24	DF	(Mexico) José Manuel Cruzalta (on loan)	(Mexico) Toluca

==== Out ====
Pos	Player	To
DF	(Mexico) Jaime Durán (on loan)	(Mexico) Chiapas
MF	(Mexico) Ignacio Carrasco (on loan)	(Mexico) Potros Neza
FW	(Mexico) Luis Ángel Landín (on loan)	(Mexico) Atlante
MF	(Argentina) Gabriel Pereyra	(Mexico) Puebla
DF	(Mexico) Marvin Cabrera (on loan)	(Mexico) Chiapas
GK	(Mexico) Moisés Muñoz	(Mexico) Atlante
MF	(Mexico) Jorge Hernández	(Mexico) Veracruz
DF	(Mexico) Omar Trujillo (on loan)	(Mexico) UANL
MF	(Mexico) Christián Sánchez	(Mexico) San Luis
FW	(Mexico) Jared Borgetti	(Mexico) León

=== Results ===
==== Results summary ====
Overall								Home						Away					
Pld	W	D	L	GF	GA	GD	Pts	W	D	L	GF	GA	GD	W	D	L	GF	GA	GD
17	5	6	6	17	16	+1	21	3	3	3	13	10	+3	2	3	3	4	6	−2

Last updated: 6 November.
Source: Apertura 2010 results

==== Results by round ====
Round	1	2	3	4	5	6	7	8	9	10	11	12	13	14	15	16	17
Ground	H	A	H	A	H	A	H	A	H	A	H	A	H	A	H	A	H
Result	W	W	W	L	W	D	L	L	L	L	D	D	D	D	L	W	D
Position	6	4	2	3	2	3	4	4	6	10	11	11	10	10	13	11	12

Updated to match(es) played on 27 October. Source: Apertura 2010 results and mediotiempo.com
A = Away; H = Home; W = Win; D = Draw; L = Loss

== Torneo Clausura ==
=== Current squad ===
Note: Flags indicate national team as defined under FIFA eligibility rules; some limited exceptions apply. Players may hold more than one non-FIFA nationality.

No.	Pos.	Nation	Player
1	GK	MEX	Carlos Felipe Rodríguez
2	DF	MEX	Enrique Pérez
3	GK	ARG	Federico Vilar (captain)
4	DF	MEX	Luis Fernando Silva
5	DF	MEX	Adrián Arías (on loan from San Luis)
6	MF	MEX	Ismael Pineda
7	FW	MEX	Rafael Márquez Lugo (on loan from Atlante)
8	MF	MEX	Jorge Gastelum
9	FW	MEX	Miguel Sabah
11	FW	ECU	Joao Rojas (on loan from Independiente)
12	GK	MEX	Yair Urbina
13	MF	MEX	Manuel Pérez
14	MF	MEX	Luis Miguel Noriega

No.	Pos.	Nation	Player
15	DF	MEX	Francisco Dorame
16	DF	MEX	Adrián Aldrete
17	MF	MEX	Rodolfo Vilchis
18	FW	COL	Luis Gabriel Rey
19	FW	MEX	Miguel Sansores
20	FW	MEX	Ángel Sepúlveda
21	MF	MEX	Jaime Lozano (on loan from Cruz Azul)
22	MF	MEX	José Rosas
26	DF	ARG	Mauricio Romero
33	DF	MEX	Joel Huiqui
77	FW	MEX	Elías Hernández
81	MF	COL	Aldo Ramírez

=== Regular season ===
January 8, 2011 Round 1	Atlas	5–0	Morelia	Estadio Jalisco, Guadalajara
8:45pm	Espinoza 27', 70'; Conde 41'; Diaz 58'; Osorno 80'	Report		Referee: Roberto García

January 16, 2011 Round 2	Morelia	1–1	Guadalajara	Estadio Morelos, Morelia
12:00pm	Márquez 71'	Report	Fabián 21'	Referee: Juan Genaro Medrano

January 22, 2011 Round 3	Querétaro	0–3	Morelia	Estadio Corregidora, Querétaro
5:00pm		Report	Márquez 56'; Lozano 80' (pen.); Hernández 90+1'	Referee: Mauricio Morales

January 30, 2011 Round 4	Morelia	3–3	San Luis	Estadio Morelos, Morelia
12:00pm	Lozano 14'; Aldrete 64'; Sabah 72'	Report	Aguirre 32' (pen.), 49'; Pérez 70' (o.g.)	Referee: Miguel Ángel Flores

February 4, 2011 Round 5	Necaxa	0–0	Morelia	Estadio Victoria, Aguascalientes
8:10pm		Report		Referee: Francisco Chacón

February 13, 2011 Round 6	Morelia	4–1	Estudiantes Tecos	Estadio Morelos, Morelia
12:00pm	Sabah 6'; Romero 15', 60'; Rey 84'	Report	Cejas 56'	Referee: Marco Antonio Rodríguez

February 20, 2011 Round 7	América	1–2	Morelia	Estadio Azteca, Mexico City
4:00pm	Sánchez 55'	Report	Márquez 1'; Rojas 41'	Referee: Jorge Isaac Rojas

February 27, 2011 Round 8	Morelia	2–1	Atlante	Estadio Morelos, Morelia
12:00pm	Huiqui 75'; Sabah 81'	Report	Bermúdez 49'	Referee: Roberto García Orozco

March 6, 2011 Round 9	Toluca	1–6	Morelia	Estadio Nemesio Díez, Toluca
12:00pm	Sinha 23'	Report	Rojas 20'; Sabah 39'; Márquez 46', 60', 72'; Ramírez 60'	Referee: Juan Genaro Medrano

March 13, 2011 Round 10	Morelia	0–1	UNAM	Estadio Morelos, Morelia
12:00pm		Report	Palencia 57'	Referee: Miguel Ángel Chacón

March 19, 2011 Round 11	Santos Laguna	0–1	Morelia	Estadio Corona, Torreón
7:00pm		Report	Márquez 86'	Referee: Miguel Ángel Ayala

April 3, 2011 Round 12	Morelia	1–3	Pachuca	Estadio Morelos, Morelia
12:00pm	Aldrete 83'	Report	Benítez 9'; Arizala 45'; Luna 90+1'	Referee: Jorge Gasso

April 9, 2011 Round 13	Cruz Azul	2–3	Morelia	Estadio Azul, Mexico City
5:00pm	Giménez 10'; Ponce 63'		Márquez 16'; Hernández 55', 90+1'	Referee: Francisco Chacón

April 12, 2011 Round 14	Morelia	2–1	Chiapas	Estadio Morelos, Morelia
8:30pm	Márquez 84'; Sepúlveda 87'	Report	Sánchez Guerrero 66'	Referee: Mauricio Morales

April 16, 2011 Round 15	Monterrey	1–1	Morelia	Estadio Tecnológico, Monterrey
7:00pm	Cardozo 28'	Report	Rey 90+3' (pen.)	Referee: Marco Antonio Rodríguez

April 24, 2011 Round 16	Morelia	0–3	UANL	Estadio Morelos, Morelia
12:00pm		Report	Lobos 14'; Pulido 84'; Acosta 87'	Referee: Paul Delgadillo

May 1, 2011 Round 17	Puebla	0–2	Morelia	Estadio Cuauhtémoc, Puebla
12:00pm		Report	Hernández 73', 84'	Referee: Juan Genaro Medrano

==== Final phase ====
May 5, 2011 Quarterfinals	América	1–2	Morelia	Estadio Corregidora, Querétaro
9:00pm	Márquez 70'	Report	M. Pérez 16'; Márquez 61'	Referee: Paul Delgadillo

May 8, 2011 Quarterfinals	Morelia	3–2	América	Estadio Morelos, Morelia
8:00pm	Rojas 31', 60'; Márquez 47' (pen.)	Report	Reyes 4'; Vuoso 65'	Referee: Marco Antonio Rodríguez

Morelia won 5–3 on aggregate

May 12, 2011 Semifinals	Cruz Azul	2–0	Morelia	Estadio Azul, Mexico City
9:00pm	Giménez 27'; Villa 45'	Report	M. Pérez 16'; Márquez 61'	Referee: Mauricio Morales

May 15, 2011 Semifinals	Morelia	3–0	Cruz Azul	Estadio Morelos, Morelia
8:00pm	Márquez 8', 11'; Lozano 88'	Report		Referee: Francisco Chacón

Morelia won 3–2 on aggregate

May 19, 2011 Final	Morelia	1–1	UNAM	Estadio Morelos, Morelia
8:30pm

May 22, 2011 Final	UNAM	2–1	Morelia	Estadio Olímpico Universitario, Mexico City
12:00pm

=== Goalscorers ===
Position	Nation	Name	Goals scored
1.	(Mexico)	Rafael Márquez Lugo	13
2.	(Mexico)	Elías Hernández	5
3.	(Ecuador)	Joao Rojas	5
3.	(Mexico)	Miguel Sabah	4
5.	(Mexico)	Jaime Lozano	4
6.	(Mexico)	Adrián Aldrete	2
6.	(Argentina)	Mauricio Romero	2
6.	(Colombia)	Luis Gabriel Rey	2
9.	(Mexico)	Manuel Pérez	1
9.	(Mexico)	Joel Huiqui	1
9.	(Colombia)	Aldo Ramírez	1
9.	(Mexico)	Ángel Sepúlveda	1
TOTAL			39

=== Results ===
==== Results summary ====
Overall								Home						Away					
Pld	W	D	L	GF	GA	GD	Pts	W	D	L	GF	GA	GD	W	D	L	GF	GA	GD
17	9	4	4	31	24	+7	31	3	2	3	13	14	−1	6	2	1	18	10	+8

Last updated: 6 May 2011.
Source: Clausura 2011 results

==== Results by round ====
Round	1	2	3	4	5	6	7	8	9	10	11	12	13	14	15	16	17
Ground	A	H	A	H	A	H	A	H	A	H	A	H	A	H	A	H	A
Result	L	D	W	D	D	W	W	W	W	L	W	L	W	W	D	L	W
Position	18	16	11	10	12	9	6	3	2	3	2	3	2	2	2	3	3

Updated to match(es) played on 23 April 2011. Source: Clausura 2011 results and mediotiempo.com
A = Away; H = Home; W = Win; D = Draw; L = Loss
