= 2011–12 Monarcas Morelia season =

Morelia
2011–12 season
- Chairman: Álvaro Dávila
- Manager: Tomás Boy
- Stadium: Estadio Morelos
- Apertura 2011: 7th Final Phase Semi-finals
- Clausura 2012: 4th Final Phase Quarter-finals
- Champions League: Quarter-finals
- Top goalscorer: League: Apertura: Miguel Sabah (8); Clausura: Miguel Sabah (10); All: Miguel Sabah (21)
Home colours	Away colours	Third colours

The 2011–12 Morelia season was the 65th professional season of Mexico's top-flight football league. The season is split into two tournaments—the Torneo Apertura and the Torneo Clausura—each with identical formats and each contested by the same eighteen teams. Morelia began their season on July 24, 2011 against Tijuana, Morelia played their homes games on Fridays at 8:10pm local time.

== Torneo Apertura ==
=== Squad ===
Note: Flags indicate national team as defined under FIFA eligibility rules; some limited exceptions apply. Players may hold more than one non-FIFA nationality.

No.	Pos.	Nation	Player
1	GK	MEX	Carlos Felipe Rodríguez
2	DF	MEX	Enrique Pérez
3	GK	ARG	Federico Vilar (captain)
5	DF	ARG	Mauricio Romero
7	FW	MEX	Rafael Márquez Lugo
8	MF	MEX	Jorge Gastélum
9	FW	MEX	Miguel Sabah
10	FW	ECU	Joao Rojas (on loan from Independiente)
11	FW	MEX	Luis Alonso Sandoval
13	FW	MEX	Miguel Sansores
14	MF	MEX	Luis Miguel Noriega
15	DF	MEX	Felipe Ayala

No.	Pos.	Nation	Player
16	DF	MEX	Adrián Aldrete
17	MF	MEX	Yasser Corona
18	MF	ARG	Damián Manso (on loan from Chiapas)
19	MF	MEX	Manuel Pérez (on loan from Monterrey)
20	FW	MEX	Ángel Sepúlveda
21	MF	MEX	Jaime Lozano (on loan from Cruz Azul)
22	DF	MEX	Diego Jiménez (on loan from Tecos)
23	MF	MEX	Édgar Lugo
24	DF	MEX	Marvin Cabrera
28	MF	COL	Aldo Ramírez
33	DF	MEX	Joel Huiqui

=== Regular season ===
Win Draw Loss

==== Apertura 2011 results ====
July 23, 2011 Round 1	Tijuana	1 – 2	Morelia	Estadio Caliente, Tijuana
17:00	Leandro (yellow card) 26'; Corona 44'; Arce (yellow card) 90+3'	Report	Sandoval 13', (yellow card) 38'; Cabrera (yellow card) 43'; Rojas (yellow card) 80'; Sabah 84' (pen.)	Referee: Miguel Ángel Chacón

July 31, 2011 Round 2	Morelia	0 – 1	UNAM	Estadio Morelos, Morelia
12:00	Gsstélum (yellow card) 59'	Report	Fuentes 17'; M. Palacios (yellow card) 14'; Castro (red card) 77'	Referee: José Alfredo Peñaloza

September 4, 2011 (Note: Moved from August 3, 2011 due to a 2011–12 CONCACAF Champions League preliminary match by Morelia) Round 3	San Luis	2 – 3	Morelia	Estadio Alfonso Lastras, San Luis Potosí
12:00	Arroyo (yellow card) 17', (goal) 31' (pen.); Blanco 90+4'	Report	Huiqui (yellow card) 29'; Lozano 39', 77' (pen.); Silva (red card) 56' (was sent off warming up); Rojas 40'; Gastelúm (yellow card) 69'; Cabrera (yellow card) 87'	Referee: Fabricio Morales

August 6, 2011 Round 4	Monterrey	2 – 0	Morelia	Estadio Tecnológico, Monterrey
21:00	Pérez (yellow card) 52'; Suazo 85'; Carreño 90'	Report	Huiqui (yellow card) 17'; Ramírez (yellow card) 32'	Referee: Fernando Guerrero

August 12, 2011 Round 5	Morelia	1 – 2	Guadalajara	Estadio Morelos, Morelia
20:10	E. Pérez (yellow card) 43'; Manso 53', (yellow card) 84'; Aldrete (yellow card) 83'	Report	Esparza (yellow card) 28'; Corona 50' (o.g.); Magallón (red card) 56'; Araujo (red card) 70'; Reynoso (yellow card) 75'; Gallardo 79' de Luna (yellow card) 90+2'	Referee: Juan Genaro Medrano

November 1, 2011 (Note: Teams played the last 50 minutes of the match that was abandoned due to a shooting outside the stadium on August 20, 2011) Round 6	Santos Laguna	0 – 2 (Note: Match was abandoned with the score 0–0)	Morelia	Estadio Corona, Torreón
20:30 (Note: Match was originally played at 19:00 local time)		Report	Corona 59'; Márquez 89'	Referee: Francisco Chacón

August 28, 2011 Round 7	Morelia	0 – 0	Puebla	Estadio Morelos, Morelia
18:00	Gastelúm (yellow card) 77'	Report	Juárez (yellow card) 26'; Álvarez (yellow card) 90'	Referee: Roberto García Orozco

September 10, 2011 Round 8	Cruz Azul	0 – 1	Morelia	Estadio Azul, Mexico City
17:00		Report	Gastélum (yellow card) 61'; Rojas 90+2'	Referee: Jorge Antonio Pérez

September 18, 2011 Round 9	Morelia	4 – 2	Querétaro	Estadio Morelos, Morelia
18:00	Sanah 17', 42', 90', (yellow card) 90'; Lozano 27'; Gastélum (yellow card) 47'; Ramírez (yellow card) 71'	Report	Bueno (yellow card) 18', (goal) 32' (pen.); Mena (yellow card) 63'; Niell 79'; Mondragón (yellow card) 85'	Referee: Miguel Ángel Flores

September 25, 2011 Round 10	Toluca	2 – 1	Morelia	Estadio Nemesio Díez, Toluca
12:00	Alonso 37', 79'; Atalavera (yellow card) 90+3'	Report	Huiqui (yellow card) 19'; Sandoval 49'; E. Pérez (yellow card) 89'	Referee: Marco Antonio Rodríguez

October 1, 2011 Round 11	Morelia	0 – 2	Estudiantes Tecos	Estadio Morelos, Morelia
17:00	Huiqui (yellow card) 52'	Report	Leaño (yellow card) 36', (goal) 58'; Lillinston 64'; Sambueza (yellow card) 56'; Zamogliny (yellow card) 82'; Medina (yellow card) 87'	Referee: Paul Delgadillo

October 9, 2011 Round 12	América	1 – 1	Morelia	Estadio Azteca, Mexico City
17:00	Valenzuela 84'	Report	Sabah 11'; Gastélum (yellow card) 18'; Cabrera (yellow card) 50' (yellow-red card) 90+1'; Noriega (yellow card) 80' (yellow-red card) 83'	Referee: Francisco Chacón

October 14, 2011 Round 13	Morelia	2 – 0	UANL	Estadio Morelos, Morelia
18:00	Vilar (yellow card) 44'; Sabah 79'; M. Pérez (yellow card) 84'; Lozano 88' (pen.)	Report	Juninho (yellow card) 54'; Viniegra (yellow card) 71'; Torres Nilo (yellow card) 74'; Salcido (yellow card) 75'	Referee: Miguel Ángel Ortega

October 22, 2011 Round 14	Atlas	1 – 1	Morelia	Estadio Jalisco, Guadalajara
20:45	Barraza 49', (yellow card) 55'; Pinto (yellow card) 64'	Report	Ramírez (yellow card) 7'; E. Pérez (yellow card) 51'; Márquez (yellow card) 64', (goal) 82'; Noriega (yellow card) 64'; Lozano (yellow card) 67'; Jiménez (yellow card) 77'	Referee: Erim Ramírez

October 25, 2011 Round 15	Morelia	2 – 2	Pachuca	Estadio Morelos, Morelia
18:30	Lugo 6'; Huiqui (yellow card) 11'; Corona (yellow card) 34'; Sepúldeva 80'	Report	Borja 34'; Hernández 60'; Herrera (yellow card) 89'	Referee: Roberto García Orozco

October 29, 2011 Round 16	Atlante	4 – 4	Morelia	Estadio Neza 86, Ciudad Nezahualcóyotl (Note: Match was moved from Cancún to Ciudad Nezahualcóyotl due to Hurricane Rina)
16:00	Venegas (yellow card) 5', (goal) 90+1'; Cuevas (yellow card) 33'; Luna (yellow card) 71'; Martínez 75', 85' (pen.); Bermúdez 82'	Report	Huiqui (yellow card) 14'; Márquez 18', 80'; Lugo 31'; Ramírez (yellow card) 52'; Venegas 69' (o.g.); Cabrera (red card) 84'; Lozano (yellow card) 90+2'	Referee: Marco Antonio Rodríguez

November 4, 2011 Round 17	Morelia	1 – 0	Chiapas	Estadio Morelos, Morelia
20:10	Huiqui (yellow card) 29' (yellow-red card) 90+1'; Márquez (yellow card) 60'; Sabah 65'	Report	M. Martínez (yellow card) 24' (yellow-red card) 53'; Arizala (yellow card) 28'; Razo (yellow card) 34'	Referee: Paul Delgadillo

=== Final phase ===
November 19, 2011 Quarter-finals	Morelia	2 – 1	Cruz Azul	Estadio Morelos, Morelia
19:00	Gastélum (yellow card) 21'; Márquez 78', 85'; Lozano (yellow card) 82'; Lugo (yellow card) 87'	Report	Orozco 32'; Corona (yellow card) 53'; Pinto (red card) 70'; A. Castro (yellow card) 72'; Aquino (yellow card) 78'; Torrado (yellow card) 81'	Referee: Erim Ramírez

November 26, 2011 Quarter-finals	Cruz Azul	1 – 2	Morelia	Estadio Azul, Mexico City
17:00	Vela 36'; Torrado (yellow card) 40' (yellow-red card) 71'; Giménez (yellow card) 89'	Report	Huiqui (yellow card) 1'; Sabah 16', (yellow card) 23'; Lugo 21'; Lozano (yellow card) 23'; Aldrete (yellow card) 64'; Gastélum (yellow card) 90+2'	Referee: Marco Antonio Rodríguez

Morelia advanced 4–2 on aggregate

November 30, 2011 Semi-finals	Morelia	2 – 1	Santos Laguna	Estadio Morelos, Morelia
20:30	Lozano 13'; Lugo 25'; Gastélum (yellow card) 50'	Report	Rodríguez (yellow card) 60'; Peralta 83'; Mares (yellow card) 57' (yellow-red card) 87'	Referee: Paul Delgadillo

December 3, 2011 Semi-finals	Santos Laguna	3 – 2	Morelia	Estadio Corona, Torreón
19:00	Rodríguez 34' (pen.); Baloy (yellow card) 41'; Suárez 52', 64'; Hoyos (yellow card) 57'; Salinas (yellow card) 67'; Figueroa (yellow card) 76'	Report	Gastélum (yellow card) 14'; Huiqui (red card) 33'; Vilar (yellow card) 37'; Sandoval (yellow card) 65'; Sepúlveda 74', 87'; Ramírez (red card) 90+1'	Referee: Marco Antonio Rodríguez

4–4 on aggregate, Santos Laguna advanced due to being the higher seed in the classification phase

=== Goalscorers ===
Position	Nation	Name	Goals scored
1.	(Mexico)	Miguel Sabah	8
2.	(Mexico)	Rafael Márquez Lugo	6
3.	(Mexico)	Jaime Lozano	5
4.	(Mexico)	Édgar Lugo	4
5.	(Mexico)	Ángel Sepúlveda	3
6.	(Ecuador)	Joao Rojas	2
6.	(Mexico)	Luis Alonso Sandoval	2
8.	(Mexico)	Yasser Corona	1
8.	(Argentina)	Damián Manso	1
8.		Own Goals	1
TOTAL			33

=== Results ===
==== Results summary ====
Overall								Home						Away					
Pld	W	D	L	GF	GA	GD	Pts	W	D	L	GF	GA	GD	W	D	L	GF	GA	GD
17	7	5	5	25	22	+3	26	3	2	3	10	9	+1	4	3	2	15	13	+2

Last updated: 5 November 2011.
Source: Apertura 2011 results

==== Results by round ====
Round	1	2	3	4	5	6	7	8	9	10	11	12	13	14	15	16	17
Ground	A	H	A	A	H	A	H	A	H	A	H	A	H	A	H	A	H
Result	W	L	W	L	L	W	D	W	W	L	L	D	W	D	D	D	W
Position	6	9	12	17	17	17	17	10	7	12	15	14	9	12	12	8	7

Updated to match(es) played on 6 November 2011. Source: Apertura 2011 results and mediotiempo.com
A = Away; H = Home; W = Win; D = Draw; L = Loss

== Transfers ==
=== In ===
#	Pos	Nat	Player	Age	From	Date	Notes
	MF	(Mexico)	Christian Valdéz	27	Jaguares	December 12, 2011	
	DF	(Mexico)	Óscar Razo	27	Jaguares	December 12, 2011	
	MF	(Mexico)	Diego Mejía	28	Neza	December 14, 2011	
	FW	(Mexico)	Víctor Guajardo	21	Neza	December 14, 2011	

=== Out ===
#	Pos	Nat	Player	Age	To	Date	Notes
19	MF	(Mexico)	Manuel Pérez	31	TBD	November 10, 2011	Sacked
22	DF	(Mexico)	Diego Jiménez	25	TBD	November 10, 2011	Sacked
14	MF	(Mexico)	Luis Miguel Noriega	26	Jaguares	December 12, 2011	
17	DF	(Mexico)	Yasser Corona	24	Jaguares	December 12, 2011	

== Torneo Clausura ==
=== Squad ===
Note: Flags indicate national team as defined under FIFA eligibility rules; some limited exceptions apply. Players may hold more than one non-FIFA nationality.

No.	Pos.	Nation	Player
1	GK	MEX	Carlos Felipe Rodríguez
2	DF	MEX	Enrique Pérez
3	GK	ARG	Federico Vilar (captain)
5	DF	ARG	Mauricio Romero
7	FW	MEX	Rafael Márquez Lugo
8	MF	MEX	Jorge Gastélum
9	FW	MEX	Miguel Sabah
10	FW	ECU	Joao Rojas (on loan from Independiente)
11	FW	MEX	Luis Alonso Sandoval
13	FW	MEX	Miguel Sansores
14	FW	COL	Edison Toloza (on loan from Millonarios)
15	DF	MEX	Felipe Ayala

No.	Pos.	Nation	Player
16	MF	MEX	Adrián Aldrete
19	DF	MEX	Oscar Razo (on loan from Chiapas)
20	FW	MEX	Ángel Sepúlveda
21	MF	MEX	Jaime Lozano (on loan from Cruz Azul)
22	MF	MEX	Diego Mejía
23	MF	MEX	Édgar Lugo (on loan from Cruz Azul)
24	DF	MEX	Marvin Cabrera
26	MF	MEX	Christian Valdez (on loan from Chiapas)
28	MF	COL	Aldo Ramírez
33	DF	MEX	Joel Huiqui
—	MF	MEX	Víctor Guajardo

=== Regular season ===
Win Draw Loss

==== Clausura 2012 results ====
January 6, 2012 Round 1	Morelia	1 – 1	Tijuana	Estadio Morelos, Morelia
20:10	Gastélum (yellow card) 7'; Márquez 23'; Aldrete (yellow card) 45+'; Rojas (yellow card) 57'	Report	Saucedo (yellow card) 44'; Mohamed (red card) 45+' (manager); Sand 45+' (pen.); Santiago (yellow card) 49'; Arce (yellow card) 61'; Arévalo Ríos (yellow card) 88'; Saucedo (yellow card) 89'	Referee: Antony Zanjuampa

January 15, 2012 Round 2	UNAM	3 – 0	Morelia	Estadio Olímpico Universitario, Mexico City
12:00	Cacho 7'; Verón (yellow card) 21'; Bravo 39', (yellow card) 68'; Velarde (yellow card) 75'; Herrera 85'	Report	Huiqui (yellow card) 26'; Gastélum (yellow card) 45+'	Referee: Jorge Antonio Pérez

January 20, 2012 Round 3	Morelia	2 – 0	San Luis	Estadio Morelos, Morelia
20:10	Lozano 10', (yellow card) 20'; Ramírez (yellow card) 32'; Rojas 72'	Report	Paredes (yellow card) 71'; Moreno (yellow card) 67'; Velasco (yellow card) 69'	Referee: Ricardo Arellano

January 27, 2012 Round 4	Morelia	0 – 0	Monterrey	Estadio Morelos, Morelia
20:10	Sabha (yellow card) 14'; Lozano (yellow card) 41' (yellow-red card) 58'; Ramírez (yellow card) 90+2'	Report	Basanta (yellow card) 24'; Arce (yellow card) 85'; Zavala (yellow card) 90+1'	Referee: Erim Ramírez

February 4, 2012 Round 5	Guadalajara	1 – 2	Morelia	Estadio Omnilife, Zapopan
19:00	Arellano 39'; Araujo (yellow card) 61'; Magallón (yellow card) 85'	Report	Pérez (yellow card) 19'; Rojas (yellow card) 65'; Sabah 57', 83', (yellow card) 85'	Referee: José Alfredo Peñaloza

February 10, 2012 Round 6	Morelia	3 – 1	Santos Laguna	Estadio Morelos, Morelia
20:10	Sabah 22', 24', (yellow card) 49'; Ramírez (yellow card) 31'; Lugo 90+1'	Report	Rodríguez (yellow card) 21'; Aldrete 28' (o.g.); Ibañez (yellow card) 47'	Referee: Roberto García Orozco

February 19, 2012 Round 7	Puebla	1 – 2	Morelia	Estadio Cuauhtémoc, Puebla
12:00	Landín (yellow card) 22'; Luis García (yellow card) 30'; Salinas 52'; Wila (yellow card) 78'; Durán (yellow card) 83'	Report	Aldrete (yellow card) 66'; Sabah 72'; Sandoval 85'; Lozano (yellow card) 86'	Referee: Jorge Isaac Rojas

February 26, 2012 Round 8	Morelia	2 – 0	Cruz Azul	Estadio Morelos, Morelia
12:00	Rojas 35'; Sabah 82'	Report	Dominguez (yellow card) 39'; Giménez (yellow card) 60'	Referee: Ricardo Arellano

March 3, 2012 Round 9	Querétaro	0 – 3	Morelia	Estadio Corregidora, Querétaro
20:10	Martínez (yellow card) 19'; Sánchez (yellow card) 90+2'; Cortés (yellow card) 90+3'	Report	Márquez 10'; Sabah 17'; Aldrete (yellow card) 22'; Sandoval (yellow card) 34'; Lugo 51'	Referee: Jorge Macias Romo

March 9, 2012 Round 10	Morelia	1 – 2	Toluca	Estadio Morelos, Morelia
20:10	Gastélum (yellow card) 30', (goal) 35'	Report	Ríos 11', (yellow card) 69'; Torres 18'; Sinha (yellow card) 40'; Talavera (yellow card) 45+'; Romagnoli (yellow card) 63'; Alonso (yellow card) 75'	Referee: Erim Ramírez

March 16, 2012 Round 11	Estudiantes Tecos	1 – 2	Morelia	Estadio Tres de Marzo, Zapopan
20:10	Bareiro 51'	Report	Lugo 15', 21'; Aldrete (yellow card) 45' (yellow-red card) 60'	Referee: Francisco Chacón

March 23, 2012 Round 12	Morelia	3 – 1	América	Estadio Morelos, Morelia
19:10	Valdez 8', (yellow card) 82'; Sabah 20'; Ramírez (yellow card) 27'; Lugo (yellow card) 55'; Lozano 70' (pen.)	Report	Mosquera (yellow card) 30'; Benítez 31', (yellow card) 33'; Montenegro (yellow card) 70'; Cárdenas (yellow card) 90+1'	Referee: Antony Zanjuampa

March 31, 2012 Round 13	UANL	4 – 1	Morelia	Estadio Universitario, San Nicolás
19:00	Hernández 14'; Salcido (yellow card) 26'; Edno 57'; Torres Nilo (yellow card) 63'; Lobos 68'; Álvarez 75'	Report	Sabah 21'; Huiqui (yellow card) 51'; Ramírez (yellow card) 56'; Pérez (yellow card) 87'	Referee: Miguel Ángel Ayala

April 6, 2012 Round 14	Morelia	0 – 0	Atlas	Estadio Morelos, Morelia
20:10	Huiqui (yellow card) 16'	Report	Chávez (yellow card) 46'	Referee: Jorge Isaac Rojas

April 14, 2012 Round 15	Pachuca	1 – 2	Morelia	Estadio Hidalgo, Pachuca
19:00	Torres (yellow card) 16'; Herrera (yellow card) 43'; Vidrio (yellow card) 65'; Bueno 71'	Report	Márquez 21', (yellow card) 56'; Cabrera (yellow card) 51'; Rojas (yellow card) 53'; Lugo 77'; Boy (red card) 90+2' (manager)	Referee: Miguel Ángel Ortega

April 20, 2012 Round 16	Morelia	1 – 1	Atlante	Estadio Morelos, Morelia
21:00	Aldrete (yellow card) 61'; Huiqui 90'	Report	Fonseca 56'; Jiménez (yellow card) 58'; Rojas (yellow card) 90+4'	Referee: Francisco Chacón

April 28, 2012 Round 17	Chiapas	1 – 0	Morelia	Estadio Victor Manuel Reyna, Tuxtla Gutiérrez
17:00	Esqueda 68'	Report	Gastélum (yellow card) 14'; Rojas (yellow card) 54'	Referee: Erim Ramírez

=== Final phase ===
May 3, 2012 Quarter-finals	UANL	1 – 0	Morelia	Estadio Universitario, San Nicolás
21:00	Mancilla 23'; Torres Nilo (yellow card) 59'; Álvarez (yellow card) 90'	Report	Huiqui (yellow card) 19'; Valdez (yellow card) 82'; Romero (yellow card) 88'; Ramírez (yellow card) 90'	Referee: Jorge Isaac Rojas

May 6, 2012 Quarter-finals	Morelia	1 – 4	UANL	Estadio Morelos, Morelia
20:00	Pérez (yellow card) 30'; Sabah (yellow card) 50', (goal) 86'; Romero (yellow card) 73'	Report	Jiménez (yellow card) 32'; Ayala (yellow card) 48', (goal) 64'; Lobos 74'; Edno 76'; Hernández 90+1' (pen.)	Referee: Mauricio Morales

UANL advanced 5–1 on aggregate

=== Goalscorers ===
==== Regular season ====
Position	Nation	Name	Goals scored
1.	(Mexico)	Miguel Sabah	9
2.	(Mexico)	Édgar Lugo	5
3.	(Mexico)	Rafael Márquez Lugo	3
4.	(Mexico)	Jaime Lozano	2
4.	(Ecuador)	Joao Rojas	2
6.	(Mexico)	Joel Huiqui	1
6.	(Mexico)	Jorge Gastélum	1
6.	(Mexico)	Luis Alonso Sandoval	1
TOTAL			25

==== Final phase ====
Position	Nation	Name	Goals scored
1.	(Mexico)	Miguel Sabah	1
TOTAL			1

=== Results ===
==== Results summary ====
Overall								Home						Away					
Pld	W	D	L	GF	GA	GD	Pts	W	D	L	GF	GA	GD	W	D	L	GF	GA	GD
17	9	4	4	25	18	+7	31	4	4	1	13	6	+7	5	0	3	12	12	0

Last updated: 28 April 2012.
Source: Clausura 2012 results

==== Results by round ====
Round	1	2	3	4	5	6	7	8	9	10	11	12	13	14	15	16	17
Ground	H	A	H	H	A	H	A	H	A	H	A	H	A	H	A	H	A
Result	D	L	W	D	W	W	W	W	W	L	W	W	L	D	W	D	L
Position	6	15	12	12	9	5	2	1	1	2	2	2	3	4	3	3	4

Updated to match(es) played on 29 April 2012. Source: Clausura 2012 results and mediotiempo.com
A = Away; H = Home; W = Win; D = Draw; L = Loss

== CONCACAF Champions League ==
=== Preliminary Round ===
July 28, 2011 1	Morelia (Mexico)	5 – 0	(Haiti) Tempête	Estadio Morelos, Morelia
20:00	Huiqui 15'; Sabah 63' (pen.); Rojas 67'; Sepúlveda 70'; Lozano 76'	Report		Attendance: 6,954; Referee: Héctor Rodríguez (Honduras)

August 3, 2011 2	Tempête (Haiti)	0 – 2	(Mexico) Morelia	Estadio Morelos, Morelia
20:00		report	Sepúlveda 30'; Sansores 78'	Referee: Javier Santos (Puerto Rico)

Notes

- Note 1: Tempête of Haiti will play both of its Preliminary Round matches in the CONCACAF Champions League against Morelia in Mexico due to incomplete renovations to Stade Sylvio Cator in Port-au-Prince.

Monarcas Morelia won 7–0 on aggregate.

=== Group Standings ===
Team	Pld	W	D	L	GF	GA	GD	Pts
(United States) Los Angeles Galaxy	6	4	0	2	8	4	+4	12
(Mexico) Morelia	6	4	0	2	11	5	+6	12
(Costa Rica) Alajuelense	6	4	0	2	8	6	+2	12
(Honduras) Motagua	6	0	0	6	2	14	−12	0

Tiebreakers

- Los Angeles Galaxy and Morelia qualified by their head-to-head records: Los Angeles Galaxy (6 pts, +1 GD), Morelia (6 pts, 0 GD), Alajuelense (6 pts, −1 GD).

=== Champions League results ===
August 16, 2011 Group 1	Alajuelense (Costa Rica)	1 – 0	(Mexico) Morelia	Estadio Alejandro Morera Soto, Alajuela
22:00	McDonald 76'	Report		Referee: Roberto Moreno (Panama)

August 25, 2011 Group 2	Morelia (Mexico)	4 – 0	(Honduras) Motagua	Estadio Morelos, Morelia
22:00	Márquez 2'; Rojas 50'; Jiménez 70'; Lugo 72'	Report		Attendance: 5,463; Referee: Elmer Bonilla (El Salvador)

September 13, 2011 Group 3	Morelia (Mexico)	2 – 1	(United States) Los Angeles Galaxy	Estadio Morelos, Morelia
20:00	Aldrete 83'; Sabah 90+2' (yellow card) 90+3'	Report	Keane 52'	Attendance: 16,000; Referee: José Pineda (Honduras)

September 22, 2011 Group 4	Motagua (Honduras)	0 – 2	(Mexico) Morelia	Estadio Tiburcio Carías Andino, Tegucigalpa
22:00		Report	Corona 55'; Manso 58'	Attendance: 1,752; Referee: Javier Santos (Puerto Rico)

September 28, 2011 Group 5	Los Angeles Galaxy (United States)	2 – 1	(Mexico) Morelia	The Home Depot Center, Carson
22:00	Magee 21'; Juninho 90+1'	Report	Márquez Lugo 59'	Attendance: 7,500; Referee: Joel Aguilar (El Salvador)

October 18, 2011 Group 6	Morelia (Mexico)	2 – 1	(Costa Rica) Alajuelense	Estadio Morelos, Morelia
20:00	Rojas 56'; Sabah 59'	Report	Gabas 36'	Attendance: 15,000; Referee: Roberto Moreno (Panama)

=== Quarter-finals ===
March 6, 2012 Quarter-final	Morelia (Mexico)	1 – 3	(Mexico) Monterrey	Estadio Morelos, Morelia
22:00	Huiqui 60'	Report	Suazo 28', 44'; Carreño 90+1'	Attendance: 14,951; Referee: Francisco Chacón (Mexico)

March 13, 2012 Quarter-final	Monterrey (Mexico)	4 – 1	(Mexico) Morelia	Estadio Tecnológico, Monterrey
22:00	Suazo 44' (pen.), 71'; Pérez 61' (pen.); Ayoví 83'	Report	Sepúlveda 78' (pen.)	Attendance: 33,000; Referee: Roberto García (Mexico)

Monterrey won 7–2 on aggregate.

=== Goalscorers ===
Position	Nation	Name	Goals scored
1.	(Ecuador)	Joao Rojas	3
1.	(Mexico)	Miguel Sabah	3
1.	(Mexico)	Ángel Sepúlveda	3
4.	(Mexico)	Joel Huiqui	2
4.	(Mexico)	Rafael Márquez Lugo	2
6.	(Mexico)	Adrián Aldrete	1
6.	(Mexico)	Yasser Corona	1
6.	(Mexico)	Diego Jiménez	1
6.	(Mexico)	Jaime Lozano	1
6.	(Mexico)	Edgar Gerardo Lugo	1
6.	(Argentina)	Damián Manso	1
6.	(Mexico)	Miguel Sansores	1
TOTAL			20
