= Aldo Leão Ramírez =

Colombian footballer (born 1981)

Aldo Leao Ramírez
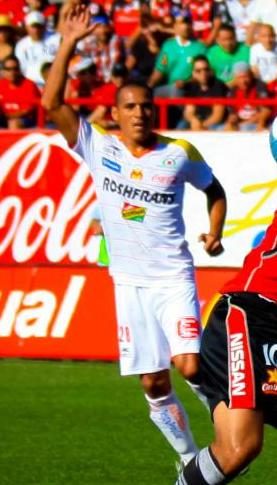

Personal information
- Full name: Aldo Leao Ramírez Sierra
- Date of birth: 18 April 1981 (age 45)
- Place of birth: Santa Marta, Colombia
- Height: 1.74 m (5 ft 8 1/2 in)
- Position: Central midfielder

Youth career
- Atlético Nacional

Senior career*
Years	Team	Apps	(Gls)
1999–2005	Santa Fe	192	(22)
2005–2007	Atlético Nacional	78	(11)
2008–2014	Morelia	196	(12)
2009	→ Atlético Nacional (loan)	15	(1)
2014–2016	Atlas	52	(2)
2016	→ Cruz Azul (loan)	31	(2)
2017–2019	Atlético Nacional	86	(10)
2019–2020	Rionegro Águilas	30	(2)

International career
2001	Colombia U20	8	(1)
2002–2014	Colombia	30	(1)
- * Club domestic league appearances and goals as of 18:05, 17 January 2021 (UTC)

Aldo Leao Ramírez Sierra (born 18 April 1981) is a Colombian footballer. He also holds Mexican citizenship.

Ramírez made his debut with Santa Fe of his home country of Colombia and also played for Atlético Nacional where he helped the team capture back-to-back league titles. In 2008 Leão moved to Mexican club Monarcas Morelia, the club where he has spent for the majority of his career. Ramírez has helped Morelia win the 2010 North American SuperLiga and the Apertura 2013 Copa MX. After the departure of goalkeeper Federico Vilar before the Clausura 2014 season, Ramírez was named captain of Morelia by then manager Carlos Bustos.

Ramírez has represented Colombia both at youth and senior level. Ramírez made his debut for the Colombia national team in 2002 in a friendly against Honduras. Ramírez first goal for Colombia came in a 3–2 loss against England in 2005.

== Club career ==
=== Santa Fe ===
==== Beginning years ====
Ramírez was part of Atlético Nacional's youth academy, and made his professional debut with Bogota-based club Independiente Santa Fe in 1999. In his first year as a professional, Santa Fe reached the final of the 1999 Copa Merconorte where they faced América de Cali. At age 18, Ramírez played the full 90 minutes of the first leg while he started the second leg but was substituted at half time by David Hernandez. Santa Fe would end up losing the final 5–3 on penalty kicks.

The following year, Ramírez helped Santa Fe finish second in the 2000 season with 74 points; he appeared in 36 games and scored three goals. In the 2001 season, he helped Santa Fe end seventh as he scored three goals in 35 appearances. In 2002, the Colombian league changed its format into two short tournaments, Apertura and Finalizacion. In the 2002 Apertura, Santa Fe finished second in the table, but in the Finalizacion, the club failed to make the playoffs.

The following years for Santa Fe were mediocre, with the club failing to qualify for the playoffs in both tournaments for 2003 and 2004, although Ramirez played many games in the 2004 season and scored eight goals.

==== Last season in Santa Fe ====
In the Apertura 2005 season, Ramírez helped Santa Fe qualify for the playoffs for the first time since the Apertura 2002 season, with a second-place finish. Santa Fe won Group B of the semifinals with 12 points and advanced to the league final against Atlético Nacional. Ramírez played the full 90 minutes in the first leg as the teams drew 0–0 at Santa Fe's Estadio El Campín. In the second leg, with the score still tied at 0–0, Ramírez was substituted out with fifteen minutes left to go, but Nacional scored twice in ten minutes to win the finals 2–0 on aggregate.

=== Atlético Nacional ===
==== Early club struggles ====
During the off-season, Ramírez moved to Atlético Nacional, the club who defeated Santa Fe in the league final just the previous season and the club where Ramírez spent his youth years. Ramírez first season at his new club did not go very well as Atlético Nacional ended in eleventh place and missed out of the semifinal stage, three spots lower than his former club Santa Fe who did qualify to the semifinals stage. Injuries in 2006 limited Ramírez to appear in 21 matches in both seasons' tournaments (Apertura and Finalización) as Nacional ended both seasons in the top eight but did not win their respective groups in the semifinals stage. Also in 2006, Ramírez made his Copa Libertadores debut in a 3–2 loss against Palmeiras, being substituted by Héctor Hurtado in the 81st minute.

==== Back-to-back titles ====
To start out the 2007 Apertura season Atlético Nacional were undefeated in the first five games; Ramírez started the first two matches as Nacional won both but was relegated to the bench for the following three. Ramírez returned to the starting line up in the sixth match against Deportivo Cali where Nacional lost 2–0. His first goal of the season came in a 2–2 draw in El Clásico Paisa in week nine. Nacional ended in third place as Ramírez appeared in the majority of the matches that season either as a substitute or a starter. Ramírez appeared in every playoff match of Nacional's title-winning campaign, helping the cliub win its ninth title with a 2–1 victory against Atlético Huila in Medellin.

Ramírez debuted in the 2007 Torneo Finalización in the second match as he helped his team defeat Santa Fe 2–0. Nacional would end up in first place with 38 points with Ramírez being constantly in the starting eleven.

In the first match of the semifinal group stage, Nacional defeated Once Caldas 1–0, and Ramírez was sent off in the 91st minute after an argument with an official. After returning from suspension, Ramírez started the match against rivals América de Cali where Nacional lost 2–1. Nacional advanced to their second straight final after a 0–0 draw with Once Caldas in the last matchday, combined with América's draw with Cúcuta Deportivo, who needed a victory to advance to the finals. In the finals, Nacional faced La Equidad, and Ramírez played the full 90 minutes in both legs as Nacional won their second straight title 3–0 on aggregate. Once again Ramírez was considered as one of the most important players from Nacional's title run, finishing the entire 2007 season making 46 appearances and scoring 9 goals.

=== Morelia ===
==== First seasons in Morelia ====
On 20 December 2007 it was announced Ramírez was transferred to Mexican club Monarcas Morelia, one day after winning the Torneo Finalización with Nacional. Ramírez made his debut for Morelia at Robertson Stadium in Houston, Texas in a 1–0 loss against Club América at the 2008 InterLiga tournament. On 26 January 2008, Ramírez scored his first two goals for the club as Morelia defeated Pachuca 3–2. After a promising start of the season, Morelia only managed to win three of the last 15 matches; with Ramírez appearing in 16 out of 17 matches.

Ramírez started out the Apertura 2008 season with a goal in a 2–2 away draw against San Luis. Morelia would end up with 25 points but did not qualify to the Liguilla. Ramírez appeared in 14 matches which he started most of them.

==== Return to Colombia ====
After two short tournaments in Morelia, Ramírez was loaned to his former club Atlético Nacional for six months, with no option to buy. La Equidad spoiled his return to Nacional with a 1–0 victory, with Ramirez playing the full match.

Ramírez appeared and started in 15 of 18 matches and scored a goal against Deportivo Pasto as Nacional ended in 17th place with 16 points. After the season Morelia rejected Nacional's offer to extend Ramírez loan after Morelia manager Tomás Boy expressed his desire for Ramírez to return to the club.

==== Return to Morelia ====
Ramírez made his Apertura 2009 season debut in a 1–1 draw against Santos Laguna, scoring the first goal of the game in the 18th minute. Ramírez would help Morelia end up in third place with 33 points in the classification phase which helped Morelia qualify to the liguilla and the 2010 Copa Libertadores. In the quarterfinals of the liguilla Morelia faced Santos Laguna, who Morelia defeated 4–2 on aggregate; Ramírez appeared as a substitute in the first leg and started the second leg where he assisted Mauricio Martín Romero on the third goal. Morelia faced Cruz Azul in the semifinals where Ramírez appeared in both legs as Cruz Azul defeated Morelia 2–1 on aggregate to advance to the league final against Monterrey.

Ramírez started the Bicentenario season playing nine of the first 10 matches, missing one due to getting sent off against San Luis in the third match. Ramírez missed five games due to an injury, returning to action in a 2–0 away loss to UNAM. Morelia qualified to the liguilla for the second straight season after ending the season seventh with 25 points. Morelia faced Guadalajara in the quarterfinals and defeated them 5–2 on aggregate, with Ramírez starting in both legs as Morelia advanced to the semifinals for the second straight season. In the semifinals against Santos Laguna, Ramirez played both legs as Morelia was eliminated 10–4 on aggregate. Ramírez finished the season with 37 appearances including two Copa Libertadores matches.

==== 2010–11 ====
Ramírez missed most of the Apertura 2010 season due to health problems, one was due to Orchitis which he was scheduled to be out 15 to 21 days. Orchitis prevented him to play the 2010 North American SuperLiga final against New England Revolution which Morelia won. He returned to action on 12 September, coming in for Ismael Pineda in the 55th minute in a 2–0 home loss to Club América. Ramírez missed 9 matches right after that due to a sports hernia. Ramírez returned to action in the 16th week in 1–0 away win over UANL, coming in the 63rd minute for Luis Gabriel Rey. Ramírez finished the Apertura 2010 season by coming on as a substitute in a 3–3 draw against Puebla. He replaced Luis Gabriel Rey at halftime but was sent off just seven minutes later, along with Puebla's Felipe Ayala, after the two exchanged punches. Morelia failed to qualify for the liguilla, finishing 12th with 21 points..

Due to his red card against Puebla in the last match of the season, Ramírez missed the Clausura 2011 opener against Club Atlas. Morelia lost the match 5–0 to an Atlas team who was fighting to stay in the first division and who would end up 10th that season. After sitting out the humiliating loss against Atlas, Ramírez returned in Morelia's home opener against Guadalajara which ended in a 1–1 draw. After playing three straight full matches, Ramírez was sent off in the fifth week match at Club Necaxa after a hard foul on Everaldo Barbosa, it was his second yellow card in 12 minutes. Ramírez returned in an away 2–1 win over Club América, assisting Rafael Márquez Lugo in the first goal just 40 seconds into the match. Two weeks later Ramírez scored his first goal of the season in a 6–1 away blowout win over Toluca. It was Morelia's fourth straight win as the team extended their unbeaten streak to eight matches, their only loss was the 5–0 opening loss to Atlas. Morelia's eight-game unbeaten streak came to an end when they fell to league leaders UNAM 1–0 at home, a team who Morelia would end up facing again that season. With Ramírez being a crucial part of the midfield Morelia ended the season with 31 points and ended third place in the classification table and second in their group.

Ramírez and Morelia faced Club América in the quarterfinals and eliminated them 5–3 on aggregate. In the semifinals against Cruz Azul, Ramírez and Morelia would make a comeback in the second leg, winning 3–0 after losing the first leg 2–0 and advancing to their first league final since 2003. The victory was overshadowed when a fan ran out on the field after the third goal and caused a brawl between the players and coaches from both clubs.

Morelia faced UNAM in the league final at Estadio Morelos, Ramírez performance was praised by various media outlets. Morelia and UNAM would end drawing 1–1 in the first leg in Morelia. In the second leg at the Estadio Olímpico Universitario, Ramírez helped Morelia draw a penalty when Miguel Sabah was tripped by Alejandro Palacios inside the penalty box after an intended pass by Ramírez. After it looked like it was going to extra time, with the scores still tied at 1-1, Javier Cortés scored the title clinching goal for Pumas UNAM.

==== 2011–12 ====
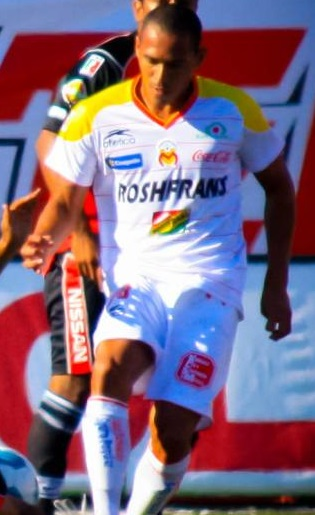
Ramírez playing against Tijuana

The Apertura 2011 season was the first season Ramírez played every single match for Morelia during the regular season. On September 18, 2011, Ramírez played his 100th league match for Morelia when the team defeated Querétaro 4–2 at Estadio Morelos. Morelia would end the season in 7th place with 26 points and faced Cruz Azul in the liguilla semifinals. With Ramírez on the field for both legs, Morelia eliminated Cruz Azul from the liguilla for the second straight season. Morelia faced Santos Laguna in the semifinals, Morelia won the first leg 2–1 in Morelia with Ramírez on the field. Morelia fell behind 3–0 in the second leg at Estadio Corona, and with the aggregate score at 4–2 Morelia needed three goals to advance to the final. After Ángel Sepúlveda scored two goals off the bench, Morelia needed one goal to advance but after a hard foul to his compatriot Carlos Quintero, Ramírez was sent off in the 91st minute; this was considered by many the final blow to Morelia.

Due to his red card in the semifinal match against Santos Laguna, Ramírez did not make his Clausura 2012 debut until the 3–0 loss to UNAM at Estadio Olímpico Universitario. The following week in a match at home against San Luis Ramírez assisted Jaime Lozano in the first goal of the match which Morelia ended winning 2–0. Ramírez played in both legs of the CONCACAF Champions league quarterfinals against Monterrey which they lost 7–2 on aggregate. Ramírez played in 15 of the 17 regular season matches for Morelia and played every single minute of those matches. Ramírez and Morelia ended the season in fourth place with 31 points and were eliminated by defending champs Tigres UANL in the quarterfinals 5–1 on aggregate.

==== 2012–13 ====
Despite various transfer rumors, Ramírez stayed in Morelia and made his Apertura 2012 debut in a scoreless draw against Cruz Azul. Like the previous season, Ramírez appeared in 15 of the 17 matches but was booked eight times, the most of any of his seasons in Morelia. Morelia ended the season in fifth with 27 points and faced Club América in the quarterfinals; due to getting a call-up from José Pekerman for Colombia's friendly against Brazil, Ramírez was unable to play the first leg in Morelia in which Morelia lost 2–0. Ramírez returned for the second leg at Estadio Azteca as Morelia won 2–1 but lost on aggregate 3–2 and were eliminated.

On 3 February 2013, Ramírez played his 150th match for Morelia but the feat was overshadowed by a 3–1 loss to Puebla. When Morelia sacked Rubén Omar Romano and replaced him with Carlos Bustos, Morelia went undefeated in the last 10 matches of the season and ended in fourth place with 30 points. Morelia faced Cruz Azul in the quarterfinals of the liguilla and Ramírez played the full match of the first leg at Estadio Azul as Cruz Azul won 4–2 and ended Morelia's 10 match unbeaten streak. Morelia won the second leg 1–0 after a goal by Rodrigo Salinas but it was not enough to advance as the aggregate score was 4–3. Ramirez ended the season with four assists.

==== 2013–14 ====
Ramirez made his Apertura 2013 debut in a 3–1 victory at Querétaro. On 16 August 2013, two days after representing Colombia against Serbia in a friendly, Ramírez assisted Rodrigo Salinas in the first goal and scored the second to lead Morelia to a 2–0 victory over Atlas. Ramírez would later go on to score goals against Monterrey and Chiapas during the season. After winning their group in the Apertura 2013 Copa MX, Morelia faced Club León in the quarterfinals; Ramírez scored the first goal and assisted Enrique Pérez in the second to lead Morelia to the semifinals. After defeating Monterrey 3–0 in the semifinals at Estadio Tecnológico Morelia advanced to the final. In the final at Estadio Morelos against Atlas, Ramírez assisted Edgar Andrade in the second goal to take a 2–0 lead; the match ended 3–3 which forced penalty kicks. Ramírez did not shoot any of the penalty kicks as Morelia won 3–1 with Federico Vilar saving three. After not being able to play the 2010 North American SuperLiga final due to a health issue, Ramírez lifted his first championship with Morelia in front of 31,830 fans at Estadio Morelos. Morelia ended the season in sixth place with 27 points and faced León in the quarterfinals without Ramírez who was inexplicably absent but it was later revealed he was injured. Ramírez returned in the second leg but Morelia would get knocked out of the liguilla when they were defeated 4–0 at Estadio León which made the aggregate score of 7–3.

After the departure of goalkeeper Federico Vilar to Atlas before the Clausura 2014 season, Ramírez was named captain of Morelia by then manager Carlos Bustos.

=== Later years ===
Later that year, Ramirez joined Atlas.

In 2017 he returned to Atletico Nacional.

He ended his career with Rionegro Aguilas in 2020 aged 39.

== International career ==
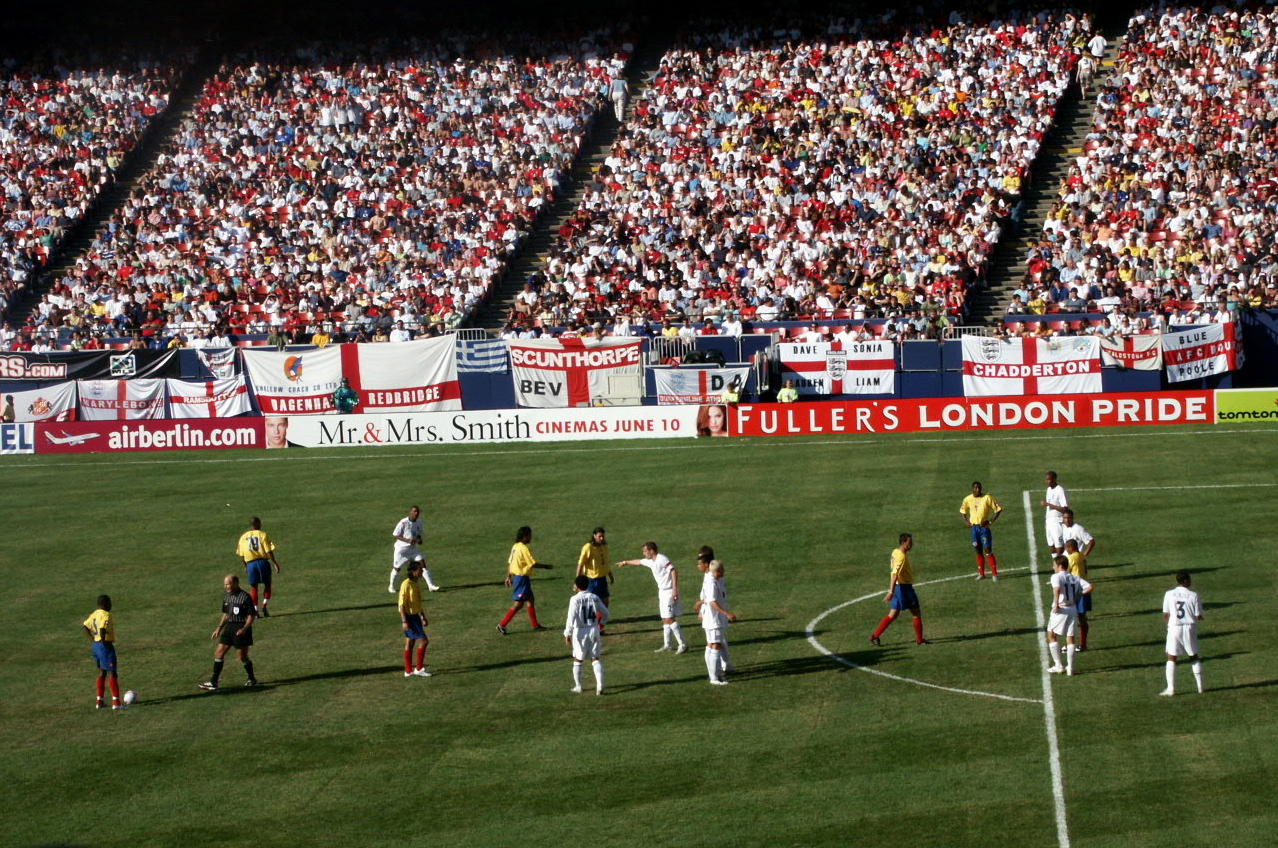
Colombia facing England in a friendly in 2005, a match in which Ramírez scored

Ramírez made his senior international debut on November 20, 2002, under Francisco Maturana coming in for John Restrepo in a 1–0 loss against Honduras.

On 31 May 2005, Ramírez scored his first international goal in a friendly against England in East Rutherford, in which Colombia lost 3–2. He was later called to the 2005 CONCACAF Gold Cup by Reinaldo Rueda where he appeared in three matches as Colombia was eliminated in the semifinals.

Ramírez received a call-up by newly appointed manager José Pékerman in February 2012 to face Mexico in a friendly in Miami Gardens; it was his first call up in nearly four years. Ramírez started the match against Mexico but was later replaced by Abel Aguilar in the 67th minute, Colombia won 2–0 in Pékerman's debut. Pékerman constantly called-up Ramírez for World Cup qualifiers and friendlies, Ramírez is mostly used as a sub but has been praised for his performances off the bench, Ramírez did start in the World Cup qualifying scoreless draw against Argentina in Buenos Aires. Five minutes after coming off the bench in a World Cup qualifier in Santiago on September 11, 2012, Ramírez assisted Radamel Falcao in the go-ahead goal which eventually led Colombia to a 3–1 victory over Chile. Colombia eventually qualified to their first World Cup in 16 years when they drew with Chile in Barranquilla on October 11, 2013, Ramírez stayed on the bench for the match.

== Career statistics ==
=== Club ===
As of April 18, 2014

Club	Season	League		Cup		Continental (Note: Includes Copa Libertadores, Copa Merconorte, Copa Sudamericana and CONCACAF Champions League.)		Other (Note: Includes other competitive competitions, including InterLiga and North American SuperLiga.)		Total	
Club	Season	Apps	Goals	Apps	Goals	Apps	Goals	Apps	Goals	Apps	Goals
Santa Fe
Santa Fe	1999	4	0	—		2	0	—		6	0
Santa Fe	2000	36	3	—						36	3
Santa Fe	2001	35	3	—						35	3
Santa Fe	2002	39	7	—						39	7
Santa Fe	2003	21	1	—						21	1
Santa Fe	2004	33	8	—						33	8
Santa Fe	2005	24	0	—						24	0
Santa Fe	Total	192	22	—		2	0	—		194	22
Atlético Nacional	2005	11	1	—		5	1	—		16	2
Atlético Nacional	2006	21	1	—		5	0	—		26	1
Atlético Nacional	2007	46	9	—		4	0	—		50	9
Atlético Nacional (loan)	2009	15	1	—						15	1
Atlético Nacional (loan)	Total	93	12	—		14	1	—		107	13
Morelia	2007–08	16	2	—				3	0	19	2
Morelia	2008–09	14	1	—				1	0	15	1
Morelia	2009–10	35	2	—		2	0	—		37	2
Morelia	2010–11	26	1	—				4	0	30	1
Morelia	2011–12	38	0	—		7	0	—		45	0
Morelia	2012–13	34	0	0	0	—				34	0
Morelia	2013–14	33	6	3	1	2	0	—		38	7
Morelia	Total	196	12	3	1	11	0	8	0	218	13
Career Total		481	46	3	1	27	2	8	0	519	49

=== International ===
As of 5 March 2014

Colombia national team
Year	Apps	Goals
2002	1	0
2003	2	0
2004	0	0
2005	6	1
2006	0	0
2007	3	0
2008	2	0
2009	0	0
2010	0	0
2011	0	0
2012	7	0
2013	8	0
2014	2	0
Total	30	1

== Honours ==
Atletico Nacional

- Categoría Primera A (2): 2007-I, 2007-II

Morelia

- North American SuperLiga (1): 2010
- Copa MX (1): Apertura 2013
