= Mario Moreno (disambiguation) =

Cantinflas (Mario Moreno, 1911–1993) was a Mexican comic film actor

Mario Moreno may also refer to:

- Mario Anguiano Moreno (born 1962), Mexican politician, governor of Colima
- Mario Moreno (footballer) (1935–2005), Chilean footballer
- Mario Antonio Moreno (born 1986), Mexican footballer
- Mario Moreno Arcos (born 1958), Mexican politician and former mayor of Chilpancingo de los Bravo, Guerrero
- Mario Moreno Zazueta (born 1942), Mexican painter, etcher and art professor
