= Manuel Romo Rodríguez =

Mexican artist

Manuel Romo Rodríguez (1920-1992) was a painter from Estación Torres, Sonora, Mexico.

Romo received his artistic training at the Academia de Artes Plásticas of the Universidad de Sonora, where he would later return as an instructor. Here he would become associated with other notable artists such as Mario Moreno Zazueta, Marth Petterson, and Roberto Peña Dessens. His works are mostly paintings, etchings, and some ceramics. His early works concentrate on landscapes and still lifes. His later work concentrates on representing darker emotions such as pain, suffering, and death.

His work has received various awards, mostly from the Salón Annual de Primavera of the Academia de Artes Plásticas of the Universidad de Sonora. His best-known works include Miniaturas and a series called Éxodo. Romo died in 1992.
