= 2015–16 Querétaro F.C. season =

The 2015–16 Querétaro F.C. season was the club's 66th season of existence, and their 15th season in the top tier of Mexican football. Querétaro competed in Liga MX and the CONCACAF Champions League.

== Roster ==
As of January 5, 2016

Note: Flags indicate national team as defined under FIFA eligibility rules; some limited exceptions apply. Players may hold more than one non-FIFA nationality.

No.	Pos.	Nation	Player
2	DF	MEX	George Corral
3	DF	ARG	Miguel Ángel Martínez (captain)
4	DF	MEX	Dionicio Escalante
5	DF	MEX	Yasser Corona
6	DF	ARG	Juan Forlín
7	FW	BRA	Camilo
8	MF	USA	Luis Gil
9	FW	MEX	Carlos Fierro (on loan from Guadalajara)
10	MF	MEX	Sinha (vice-captain) (on loan from Toluca)
12	DF	USA	Jonathan Bornstein
13	DF	MEX	Víctor Milke
14	MF	MEX	Luis Miguel Noriega
15	FW	MEX	Ángel Sepúlveda

No.	Pos.	Nation	Player
16	MF	ARG	Nery Domínguez
17	MF	MEX	Mario Osuna
18	DF	MEX	Ricardo Esqueda
19	MF	COL	Yerson Candelo
21	MF	MEX	Marco Jiménez
23	GK	MEX	Édgar Hernández
24	FW	PAR	Édgar Benítez
27	FW	MEX	Luis Madrigal (on loan from Monterrey)
28	MF	MEX	Jaime Gómez
30	FW	ARG	Emanuel Villa (3rd captain)
31	GK	BRA	Tiago Volpi
33	GK	MEX	Gil Alcalá

== Competitions ==
=== Liga MX ===
==== Apertura ====
1	v

2	v

3	v

4	v

5	v

6	v

7	v

8	v

9	v

10	v

11	v

12	v

13	v

14	v

15	v

16	v

17	v

==== Clausura ====
8 January 2016 1	Querétaro	1–3	Atlas	Querétaro City
				Stadium: Estadio Corregidora

16 January 2016 2	Pachuca	1–0	Querétaro	Pachuca
				Stadium: Estadio Hidalgo

22 January 2016 3	Querétaro	3–0	Dorados	Querétaro City
				Stadium: Estadio Corregidora

29 January 2016 4	Santos Laguna	2–0	Querétaro	Torreón
				Stadium: Estadio Corona

5 February 2016 5	Querétaro	2–1	Veracruz	Querétaro City
				Stadium: Estadio Corregidora

13 February 2016 6	Cruz Azul	2–1	Querétaro	Mexico City
				Stadium: Estadio Azul

19 February 2016 7	Querétaro	2–2	Tigres UANL	Querétaro City
20:30	Forlín 45'; Jiménez 48'	Report	Gignac 12'; Aquino 50'	Stadium: Estadio Corregidora; Referee: Diego Montaño

=== CONCACAF Champions League ===
==== Group stage ====
Pos	Team	Pld	W	D	L	GF	GA	GD	Pts	Qualification
1	(Mexico) Querétaro	4	2	1	1	11	2	+9	7	Knockout stage
2	(Panama) San Francisco	4	2	0	2	11	5	+6	6	
3	(Belize) Verdes	4	1	1	2	2	17	−15	4	

Source: CONCACAF
Rules for classification: Group stage tiebreakers

4 August 2015 1	Querétaro (Mexico)	2–0	(Panama) San Francisco	Querétaro City
20:00 EDT	Villa 61'; Milke 76'	Report		Stadium: Estadio Corregidora

18 August 2015 2	Verdes (Belize)	0–0	(Mexico) Querétaro	Belmopan
20:00 EDT		Report		Stadium: FFB Stadium; Referee: Valdin Legister (Jamaica)

26 August 2015 3	San Francisco (Panama)	2–1	(Mexico) Querétaro	Panama City
20:00 EDT	Rodríguez 89'; Alfaro 90'	Report	Sinha 76'	Stadium: Estadio Maracaná; Referee: Walter López (Guatemala)

26 August 2015 3	Querétaro (Mexico)	8–0	(Belize) Verdes	Querétaro City
22:00	Gutiérrez 15'; Villa 30', 51', 53', 85', 90'; Sinha 81'; Danilinho 86'	Report		Stadium: Estadio Corregidora; Referee: Elmer Bonilla (El Salvador)

==== Quarterfinals ====
23 February 2016 First leg	Querétaro (Mexico)	2–0	(United States) D.C. United	Querétaro City
20:00 EDT	Candelo 71'; Benítez 83'	Summary	Sarvas (yellow card) 73'	Stadium: Estadio Corregidora; Referee: (United States) Ramón Hernández

1 March 2016 Second leg	D.C. United (United States)	1–1 (1–3 agg.)	(Mexico) Querétaro	Washington, D.C.
20:00 EDT	Sarvas (yellow card) 12'; Boswell (yellow card) 72'; Büscher 84'			Stadium: RFK Stadium; Attendance: 10,790

==== Semifinals ====
16 March 2016 First leg	Querétaro (Mexico)	0–0	(Mexico) UANL	Querétaro City
20:00 EDT				Stadium: Estadio Corregidora

6 April 2016 Second leg	UANL (Mexico)	2–0 (2–0 agg.)	(Mexico) Querétaro	San Nicolás de los Garza
20:00 EDT				Stadium: Estadio Universitario
