= Ángel Sepúlveda =

Mexican footballer (born 1991)

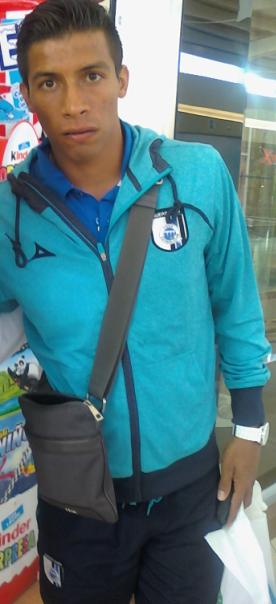
- Sepúlveda with Querétaro in 2014

Personal information
- Full name: Ángel Baltazar Sepúlveda Sánchez
- Date of birth: 15 February 1991 (age 35)
- Place of birth: Apatzingán, Michoacán, Mexico
- Height: 1.81 m (5 ft 11 in)
- Position: Forward

Team information
- Current team: Guadalajara
- Number: 20

Senior career*
Years	Team	Apps	(Gls)
2010–2013	Morelia	25	(4)
2013	→ Toros Neza (loan)	19	(2)
2013–2014	Atlante	29	(6)
2014–2017	Querétaro	87	(11)
2017–2018	Morelia	37	(5)
2018	Guadalajara	5	(0)
2019	Necaxa	19	(2)
2019–2021	Tijuana	19	(2)
2020–2021	→ Querétaro (loan)	34	(9)
2021	→ Necaxa (loan)	10	(0)
2022–2023	Querétaro	50	(14)
2023–2025	Cruz Azul	92	(30)
2026–	Guadalajara	28	(5)

International career^{‡}
2016–2025	Mexico	12	(3)
Medal record
Men's football
Representing Mexico
CONCACAF Gold Cup
Winner	2025 United States–Canada
CONCACAF Nations League
Winner	2025 United States
- * Club domestic league appearances and goals as of 17 October 2026 ‡ National team caps and goals as of 21 June 2025

Ángel Baltazar Sepúlveda Sánchez (born 15 February 1991) is a Mexican professional footballer who plays as a forward for Liga MX club Guadalajara.

== Club career ==
=== Early career ===
Sepúlveda was born in Apatzingán, Michoacán. He made his senior team debut for Monarcas on 18 September 2010 as a substitute in a match against Atlante.

Sepúlveda scored his first goal on 4 April 2011, against Chiapas that gave Monarcas the win in a 2–1 victory. He scored his second and third goal against Tempête Football Club during the preliminary rounds of the first-leg and second-leg of the CONCACAF Champions League. On 10 October 2011 he scored his fourth goal against Pachuca to tie the game 2-2 during a regular season matchup of the 2011–12 Mexican Primera División season. On 4 December 2011 he came off as a substitute yet again replacing the injured Miguel Sabah and scored two goals against Santos Laguna to tie up the aggregate score 4–4 but due to Santos Laguna's higher seeding on the league table they failed to advance for the final of the Liguilla

=== Guadalajara ===
On 7 June 2018, Guadalajara announced the signing of Sepúlveda.

=== Cruz Azul ===
On 29 August 2023, Cruz Azul announced the signing of Sepúlveda. On 4 October 2023, Sepúlveda scored a hat-trick with his first goal coming via bicycle kick.

On 9 November 2024, Sepúlveda scored a header during the last minute of the last league game for the Apertura 2024 against Tigres UANL which helped Cruz Azul break the record for most points during a short league season.

Sepúlveda was named top scorer of the 2025 CONCACAF Champions Cup ahead of players such as Lionel Messi and Luis Suárez, as Sepúlveda had scored a total of 9 goals, scoring in all stages of the tournament including a brace against cross-city rivals América during the quarter-finals, a penalty against Tigres UANL in the semi-finals, and another brace during the final against the Vancouver Whitecaps FC where Cruz Azul won 5–0 claiming their seventh CONCACAF Champions Cup trophy.

On 19 July 2025, during the second match day of the Apertura 2025, Sepúlveda scored his second hat trick for Cruz Azul against Atlas at Estadio Jalisco, where the game ended in a 3–3 draw.

In December, Sepúlveda joined Guadalajara.

== International career ==
=== Senior career ===
Sepúlveda never represented any of Mexico's youth teams, and he was first called up to the senior national team under Colombian manager Juan Carlos Osorio for the qualification of the 2018 FIFA World Cup in Russia. Sepúlveda made his national team debut on 2 September 2016 against El Salvador where he scored the second goal of the match as Mexico went on to win the game 3–1.

After the match Sepulveda went on to state the following during an interview with ESPN México:

"It was an unforgettable night, it was a dream come true to be with the national team and represent a whole country."

Sepúlveda was called up for the 2017 CONCACAF Gold Cup where he played six matches and scored a goal during the tournament's group stage against Curaçao where Mexico won 2–0.

After a seven-year absence from the national team, Sepúlveda was called back up by Javier Aguirre for the CONCACAF Nations League matches against Honduras during November 2024. On 7 June 2025, Sepúlveda scored his third goal for the national team during a friendly match against Switzerland where Mexico lost 4–2. Sepúlveda was once again called up for the 2025 CONCACAF Gold Cup where he was crowned champion with the Mexico national team.

== Career statistics ==
=== Club ===
As of match played on 17 October 2026

Appearances and goals by club, season and competition
Club	Season	League			Copa MX		Continental (Note: Includes CONCACAF Champions League/Cup)		Other		Total	
Club	Season	Division	Apps	Goals	Apps	Goals	Apps	Goals	Apps	Goals	Apps	Goals
Morelia	2010–11	Mexican Primera División	5	1	—		—		—		5	1
Morelia	2011–12	Mexican Primera División	15	3	—		7	3	—		22	6
Morelia	2012–13	Liga MX	5	0	6	2	—		—		11	2
Morelia	Total		25	4	6	2	7	3	—		38	9
Toros Neza (loan)	2012–13	Ascenso MX	19	2	4	1	—		—		23	3
Atlante	2013–14	Liga MX	29	6	5	2	—		—		34	8
Querétaro	2014–15	Liga MX	37	6	9	3	—		—		46	9
Querétaro	2015–16	Liga MX	23	3	—		6	1	—		29	4
Querétaro	2016–17	Liga MX	27	2	5	1	—		—		32	3
Querétaro	Total		87	11	14	4	6	1	—		107	16
Morelia	2017–18	Liga MX	37	5	4	2	—		—		41	7
Guadalajara	2018–19	Liga MX	5	0	5	1	—		—		10	1
Necaxa	2018–19	Liga MX	19	2	—		—		—		19	2
Tijuana	2019–20	Liga MX	19	2	7	0	—		1 (Note: Includes Leagues Cup)	0	27	2
Querétaro (loan)	2020–21	Liga MX	34	9	—		—		—		34	9
Necaxa (loan)	2021–22	Liga MX	10	0	—		—		—		10	0
Querétaro	2021–22	Liga MX	17	5	—		—		—		17	5
Querétaro	2022–23	Liga MX	29	6	—		—		—		29	6
Querétaro	2023–24	Liga MX	4	3	—		—		5	2	9	5
Querétaro	Total		50	14	—		—		5	2	55	16
Cruz Azul	2023–24	Liga MX	33	9	—		—		—		33	9
Cruz Azul	2024–25	Liga MX	39	14	—		8	9	3	0	50	23
Cruz Azul	2025–26	Liga MX	20	7	—		—		4 (Note: Three appearances in Leagues Cup and one appearance in FIFA Intercontinental Cup)	0	24	7
Cruz Azul	Total		92	30	—		8	9	7	0	107	39
Guadalajara	2025–26	Liga MX	17	4	—		—		—		17	4
Guadalajara	2026–27	Liga MX	11	1	—		—		1	0	12	1
Guadalajara	Total		28	5	—		—		1	0	29	5
Career total			454	90	45	12	21	13	14	2	534	117

=== International ===
As of match played on 18 June 2025

Appearances and goals by national team and year
Team	Year	Apps	Goals
Mexico	2016	2	1
Mexico	2017	6	1
Mexico	2018	0	0
Mexico	2019	0	0
Mexico	2020	0	0
Mexico	2021	0	0
Mexico	2022	0	0
Mexico	2023	0	0
Mexico	2024	1	0
Mexico	2025	3	1
Total		12	3

International goals

Scores and results list Mexico's goal tally first.

Goal	Date	Venue	Opponent	Score	Result	Competition
1.	2 September 2016	Estadio Cuscatlán, San Salvador, El Salvador	El Salvador	2–1	3–1	2018 FIFA World Cup qualification
2.	16 July 2017	Alamodome, San Antonio, United States	Curaçao	1–0	2–0	2017 CONCACAF Gold Cup
3.	7 June 2025	Rice–Eccles Stadium, Salt Lake City, United States	Switzerland	2–3	2–4	Friendly

== Honours ==
Querétaro

- Copa MX: Apertura 2016

Cruz Azul

- CONCACAF Champions Cup: 2025

Mexico

- CONCACAF Gold Cup: 2025
- CONCACAF Nations League: 2024–25

Individual

- Liga MX Player of the Month: October 2024, July 2025
- Liga MX Best XI: Apertura 2024
- CONCACAF Champions Cup Best Player: 2025
- CONCACAF Champions Cup Golden Boot: 2025
- CONCACAF Champions Cup Best XI: 2025
- Liga MX All-Star: 2025
