= La Colorada, Sonora =

Village in Sonora, Mexico

Coordinates: 28°48′00″N 110°34′00″W

La Colorada is a small town in La Colorada Municipality in the Mexican state of Sonora in north-western Mexico. In 2005, the population of the municipality was 1,754, with 288 living in the municipal seat.

== History ==
The now-municipality was founded by Spanish Jesuit missionaries at some point between 1740 and 1743, as Mission San Francisco de Borja de Tecoripa. Formerly known as Minas Prietas, La Colorada became a municipality on June 28, 1934. As an important mining camp in Mexico, La Colorada boasted a population that topped 5,604 in 1895. The municipality is situated 45 km (29 mi) southeast of Hermosillo.

Other small towns located within the municipality include Tecorípa, Cobachi, Estación Torres, and San José de Pimas.

Main economic activities in La Colorada is Mining. Mina La Colorada is the main company which extracts from earth Gold, Copper and Zinc. Another mine nearby La Colorada extracts graphite to be used for domestic and industrial purposes.
