= Uriel Álvarez =

Mexican footballer (born 1990)

Personal information
- Full name: Uriel Álvarez Rivera
- Date of birth: 1 May 1990 (age 36)
- Place of birth: Acapulco, Mexico
- Height: 1.78 m (5 ft 10 in)
- Position: Defender

Team information
- Current team: Atlético San Luis
- Number: 3

Senior career*
| Years | Team | Apps | (Gls) |
| 2008– | Santos Laguna | 49 | (1) |
| 2011 | → Puebla (loan) | 0 | (0) |
| 2012 | → Veracruz (loan) | | |
| 2012–2013 | → Morelia (loan) | 30 | (0) |
| 2013 | → Chiapas (loan) | 15 | (0) |
| 2014 | → Puebla (loan) | 14 | (0) |
| 2015 | → Sinaloa (loan) | | |
| 2015 | → Tijuana (loan) | 7 | |
| 2016– | → Atlético San Luis (loan) | | |

International career
| 2011 | Mexico U23 | 2 | (0) |
- * Club domestic league appearances and goals

Uriel Álvarez Rivera (born 1 May 1990) is a Mexican professional footballer, who plays as a defender for Atlético San Luis in the Ascenso MX, on loan from Club Santos Laguna.
