= Estación Torres =

Coordinates: 28.7636°N 110.7697°W

Estación Torres is a small town in the Mexican state of Sonora. At the turn of the twentieth century, Estación Torres and nearby Minas Prietas formed the "greatest mining camp in northwest Mexico." The town developed rapidly due to foreign investment and its location along the Sonoran railroad, but it soon declined in the early twentieth century. In 2005, the population of the town was 178.
