= Reiji Sato =

Japanese footballer

Personal information
- Date of birth: May 27, 1993 (age 33)
- Place of birth: Kitakata, Fukushima, Japan
- Height: 1.69 m (5 ft 7 in)
- Position: Midfielder

Team information
- Current team: Estudiantes Tecos
- Number: 22

Youth career
- 2010–2012: JFA Academy Fukushima
- 2012: Morelia

Senior career*
Years	Team	Apps	(Gls)
2013	Morelia	0	(0)
2014–	Estudiantes Tecos	0	(0)

International career
2006	Japan u14	?	
2008	Japan u16		
2009	Japan u17		
- * Club domestic league appearances and goals

Reiji Sato (佐藤令治, Satō Reiji; born May 5, 1993 in Kitakata, Fukushima) is a Japanese footballer who plays in for Estudiantes Tecos as a midfielder. He is the first Japanese to play a match for a team in the top Mexican league. He has played for the U-14, U-16, and U-17 Japanese national teams.

He began his career at the JFA Academy Fukushima in Japan, until he joined the basic forces of Monarcas Morelia in 2013. In 2014 he was signed by Estudiantes Tecos of the Second Division of Mexico.
