= Mario Antonio Moreno =

Mexican footballer (born 1986)

Personal information
- Full name: Mario Antonio Moreno González
- Date of birth: December 4, 1986 (age 39)
- Place of birth: Tlalixcoyan, Mexico
- Height: 1.67 m (5 ft 5 1/2 in)
- Position: Midfielder

Team information
- Current team: Oaxaca
- Number: 23

Senior career*
Years	Team	Apps	(Gls)
2006–2010	Morelia	19	(1)
2010–2011	Mérida	10	(0)
2011–2013	Atlante UTN / Neza	20	(1)
2012	→ Instituto (loan)	8	(0)
2013–	Oaxaca		
- * Club domestic league appearances and goals as of 31 July 2013

Mario Antonio Moreno González (born 4 December 1986) is a Mexican football midfielder. He currently plays for Alebrijes de Oaxaca.

Moreno made his professional debut with Monarcas in 2006.
