= Mario Moreno Zazueta =

Mexican Painter

Mario Moreno Zazueta is a painter, etcher and art professor born in Hermosillo, Sonora, Mexico in 1942. He received his artistic training at the Academia Artes Plásticas of the Universidad de Sonora and at the Escuela Nacional de Pintura y Escultura La Esmeralda in Mexico City. After this, he also went to San Francisco, California to study as well. Moreno notes that his main artistic influence has been Héctor Martínez Arteche. Moreno's work has been displayed in numerous shows and galleries in various parts of the world, where is work is known for its abstract experimentation with color, light and shadow. His best-known works include Premonición del atardecer, Llovió en alguna parte, El agua del norte nunca llega, Premonición del invierno and Las horas quietas. Today, he is a professor at the Universidad de Sonora.
