= Fernando Salazar =

Mexican footballer (born 1979)

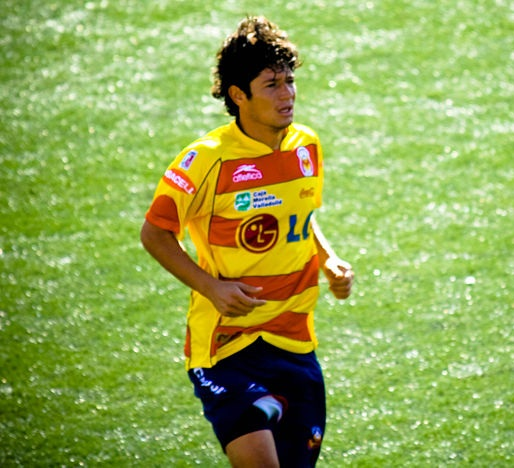
- Salazar playing for Morelia

Personal information
- Full name: Fernando Salazar Lomelí
- Date of birth: 13 July 1979 (age 47)
- Place of birth: Guadalajara, Jalisco, Mexico
- Height: 1.78 m (5 ft 10 in)
- Position: Defender

Senior career*
Years	Team	Apps	(Gls)
1999–2005	Atlas	168	(6)
2001	Toluca	17	(0)
2005–2008	Pachuca	110	(13)
2008–2015	Morelia	84	(4)
2011	→ Necaxa (loan)	12	(0)
2011–2012	→ León (loan)	22	(0)
2013–2015	→ Mérida (loan)	38	(5)

International career
2003–2006	Mexico	9	(0)
Medal record
Representing Mexico
CONCACAF Gold Cup
Winner	CONCACAF Gold Cup	2003
- * Club domestic league appearances and goals

Fernando Salazar Lomelí (born 13 July 1979) is a Mexican former footballer who played as a defender.

== Honours ==
Pachuca

- Mexican Primera División: Clausura 2006, Clausura 2007
- CONCACAF Champions' Cup: 2007, 2008
- Copa Sudamericana: 2006
- North American SuperLiga: 2007

León

- Liga de Ascenso: Clausura 2012

Mexico

- CONCACAF Gold Cup: 2003

Individual

- CONCACAF Gold Cup Best XI (Reserves): 2003
