= Luis Fernando Silva =

Mexican footballer (born 1989)

Personal information
- Full name: Luis Fernando Silva Ochoa
- Date of birth: 23 March 1989 (age 37)
- Place of birth: Morelia, Michoacán, Mexico
- Height: 1.74 m (5 ft 8 1/2 in)
- Position: Defender

Youth career
- Morelia

Senior career*
| Years | Team | Apps | (Gls) |
| 2007– | Morelia | 24 | (0) |
| 2011–2013 | → Toros Neza | 49 | (0) |

International career
| 2009– | Mexico U-20 | ? | (?) |
- * Club domestic league appearances and goals as of 15 September 2013

Luis Fernando Silva Ochoa (born 23 March 1989) is a Mexican footballer who plays as a defender.

He came up through the Monarcas youth systems and had a chance to debut for the first squad during the Apertura 2009 league tournament, thanks to manager Tomás Boy.

Silva has also been capped by the Mexico U-20 team during the 2009 CONCACAF U-20 Championship.

== Honours ==
Morelia

- Supercopa MX: 2014
