= Enrique Pérez (footballer) =

Mexican footballer (born 1988)

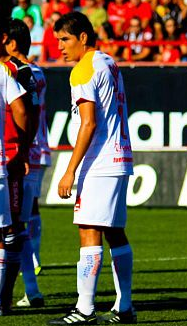
- Pérez with Morelia

Personal information
- Full name: Enrique Pérez Herrera
- Date of birth: 13 October 1988 (age 38)
- Place of birth: Zinapécuaro, Michoacán, Mexico
- Height: 1.75 m (5 ft 9 in)
- Position: Defender

Youth career
- Morelia

Senior career*
Years	Team	Apps	(Gls)
2009–2014	Morelia	141	(3)
2014	→ Atlas (loan)	17	(0)
2014–2015	Atlas	38	(3)
2015–2018	→ Morelia (loan)	66	(2)
2018	Tapachula	16	(1)
2018–2019	Veracruz	2	(0)

International career^{‡}
2012–2013	Mexico	4	(0)

Managerial career
- 2020: La Piedad (Liga TDP)
- 2021: La Piedad (Assistant)
- 2021–2023: La Piedad
- 2026: Ayense
- * Club domestic league appearances and goals as of 19 October 2018 ‡ National team caps and goals as of 22 April 2015

Enrique Pérez Herrera (born October 13, 1988) is a Mexican former footballer who last played for Veracruz of Liga MX.

== Club career ==
=== Monarcas Morelia ===
Pérez made his first division debut on November 14, 2009, in a 1–1 draw with Monterrey, Pérez started the match and was substituted by Marvin Cabrera in the 87th minute. He got a start in the second leg of the semifinal of the Apertura 2009 playoffs against Cruz Azul, he was replaced by Sergio Blancas in the 77th minute as Morelia ended up losing 2–1. In the Bicentenario 2010, Pérez appeared in more matches, he started five matches and was a substitute in three, he also appeared in the 2010 Copa Libertadores. Pérez also helped Morelia capture the 2010 North American SuperLiga, when Morelia defeated New England Revolution 2–1 in Foxborough, Massachusetts.

Pérez became a regular starter in the Apertura 2010 season, he appeared in all 17 league matches but Morelia failed to reach the playoffs. During a match in the Apertura 2011 season against San Luis, Pérez made two errors that caused Wilmer Aguirre to score two goals for San Luis and Pérez also ended up scoring an own goal, he was replaced by Marvin de la Cruz in the 74th minute, the score ended up 3–3. Despite his match against San Luis, Pérez still was a regular starter for Morelia during the Apertura 2010 season, he started 21 of 23 matches. Pérez registered his first assist when he assisted Miguel Sabah in the first goal in a 4–1 win against Estudiantes Tecos. Pérez appeared in all six of Morelia playoff matches, he appeared in the final where Morelia ended up losing to UNAM 3–2 in aggregate.

== Honors ==
Morelia

- North American SuperLiga: 2010
- Copa MX: Apertura 2013

Tapachula

- Ascenso MX: Clausura 2018
