= Joao Rojas (footballer, born 1989) =

Ecuadorian footballer

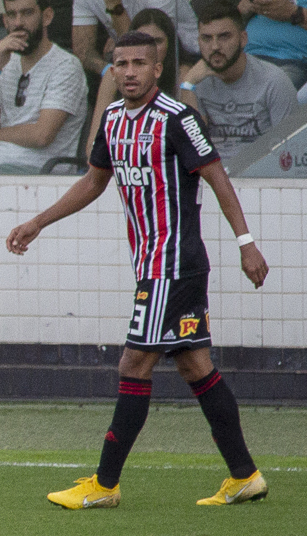
- Rojas with São Paulo in 2018

Personal information
- Full name: Joao Robin Rojas Mendoza
- Date of birth: 14 June 1989 (age 37)
- Place of birth: La Troncal, Ecuador
- Height: 1.74 m (5 ft 9 in)
- Position: Winger

Team information
- Current team: ADT
- Number: 7

Youth career
- 2006: Municipal Cañar
- 2008: River Plate

Senior career*
Years	Team	Apps	(Gls)
2007–2008	Técnico Universitario	67	(6)
2009–2011	Independiente DV	0	(0)
2009–2010	→ Emelec (loan)	75	(13)
2011	→ Morelia (loan)	42	(7)
2012–2013	Morelia	53	(11)
2013–2018	Cruz Azul	111	(20)
2017–2018	→ Talleres (loan)	12	(1)
2018–2021	São Paulo	33	(1)
2022	Orense	22	(2)
2023	Deportivo Garcilaso	27	(5)
2024-	ADT	53	(14)

International career
2009	Ecuador U20	4	(2)
2008–2015	Ecuador	34	(2)
- * Club domestic league appearances and goals as of 30 December 2025

Joao Robin Rojas Mendoza (Spanish pronunciation: [ɟʝoˈao ˈroxas]; born 14 June 1989) is an Ecuadorian professional footballer who plays as a winger for ADT. He also holds Mexican citizenship.

== Club career ==
=== Ecuadorian clubs ===
At a young age, he had already played more than 80 games as a professional. He began in Municipal de Cañar as a juvenile for twelve months. The following year, he moved on to Deportivo Quevedo, but was then transferred to Barcelona for a while. In 2007, he moved to Tecnico Universitario where he began his real career. In the 2008 season, he won the award of best juvenile player of the tournament with Tecnico. However, since Tecnico did not qualify for the liguilla final, the club loaned him to River Plate in the Ecuadorian Second Division until January. He has currently been linked with a move to Emelec in the offseason. LDU Quito, El Nacional, and Barcelona have been interested in him as well but they have been put down because of his $1 million price tag. On February 10, 2009, Rojas signed a contract with Emelec.

=== Monarcas Morelia ===
==== 2011 season ====
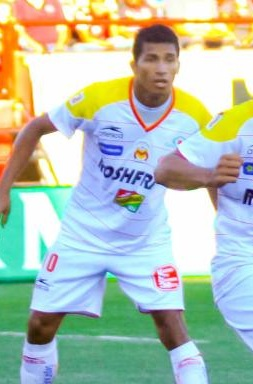
Rojas playing for Morelia in 2011

Emelec loaned Rojas to Morelia in January 2011, in his first season Rojas scored five goals in 22 games, two of which goals were on the semi-final match against Club America, and also scored on the final against UNAM at home, drawing 1–1 in the first leg. but failed to win the championship, and settled for second.

==== 2011–12 season ====
Monarcas secured his pass to the Michoacán club and received the number 10 shirt for the club. Rojas played 20 games and scored 2 goals. The second half of the season, also called the Clausura, Rojas helped the club to reach the semi-final stages of both the Mexican league and CONCACAF Champions League as well.

==== 2012–13 season ====
Before the start of the Apertura 2012 season Morelia signed Jefferson Montero, Rojas' former Ecuador U-20 teammate, Rojas and Montero continuously assisted each other in both League and Copa MX matches. His first league goal of the season came in a 3–0 win against Puebla. Later he would score against Club León both league and cup matches, both within a week. He would go on to score two more goals against Querétaro and Atlas.

=== Cruz Azul ===
==== 2013–14 season ====
On the Liga MX draft day, Joao Rojas was transferred to Cruz Azul, and was given the number 11 shirt. His club debut came on July 20, winning 1–0 against Monterrey. On July 26, Joao scored his first goal for Cruz Azul, losing 3–2 against Santos Laguna.

=== São Paulo ===
On 22 June 2018, Rojas joined Brazilian club São Paulo FC on a two-year contract.

=== Return to Ecuador ===
On 23 March 2022, Rojas returned to Ecuador and signed with Orense.

== International career ==
He was called up to perform at the international level, getting his first cap against Mexico in November 2008. He came on as a substitute in the final minutes of the game. Rojas earned his first senior start the next year in March 2009, in a friendly played against El Salvador.

Rojas have been compared by "El Universo" to Christian Benítez because of his speed, skills, and size. He performed in the U-20 team in Venezuela for the 2009 South American Youth Championship. He scored the two goals in Ecuador's 2–1 win against Peru in the youth championship. Rojas has now been called up for the upcoming South American World Cup Qualifiers and is in contention for a starting line up alongside Carlos Tenorio due to a shoulder injury. Rojas was picked in the 2014 World Cup by Reinaldo Rueda. He came on in the 77' in Ecuador first match against Switzerland.

=== International goals ===
#	Date	Venue	Opponent	Score	Final	Competition
1.	11 November 2011	Estadio Defensores del Chaco, Asunción, Paraguay	Paraguay	1–2	1–2	2014 FIFA World Cup qualification
2.	21 March 2013	Estadio Olímpico Atahualpa, Quito, Ecuador	El Salvador	5–0	5–0	Friendly

== Career statistics ==
As of February 21, 2016

Club	Season	League		Cup		Continental		Total	
Club	Season	Apps	Goals	Apps	Goals	Apps	Goals	Apps	Goals
Técnico Universitario	2007	36	3	–		–		36	3
Técnico Universitario	2008	31	3	–		0	0	31	3
Técnico Universitario	Total	67	6	–		0	0	67	6
Emelec	2009	32	6	–		4	0	36	6
Emelec	2010	44	7	–		11	4	55	11
Emelec	Total	76	13	–		15	4	91	17
Morelia	2011 Clausura	22	5	0	0	0	0	22	5
Morelia	2011-12	38	4	0	0	6	3	44	7
Morelia	2012-13	35	9	4	2	0	0	39	11
Morelia	Total	95	18	4	2	6	3	105	23
Cruz Azul	2013-14	32	8	0	0	8	0	40	8
Cruz Azul	2014-15	28	4	0	0	5	1	33	5
Cruz Azul	2015–16	21	2	2	0	0	0	23	2
Cruz Azul	Total	81	14	2	0	13	1	96	15
Career total		319	51	6	2	34	8	359	61

=== National team ===
Ecuador
Year	Apps	Goals
2008	1	0
2009	3	0
2010	6	0
2011	3	1
2012	4	0
2013	10	1
2014	6	0
2015	1	0
Total	34	2

== Honours ==
Cruz Azul

- CONCACAF Champions League: 2013–14

São Paulo

- Campeonato Paulista: 2021
