= Federico Vilar =

Argentine footballer

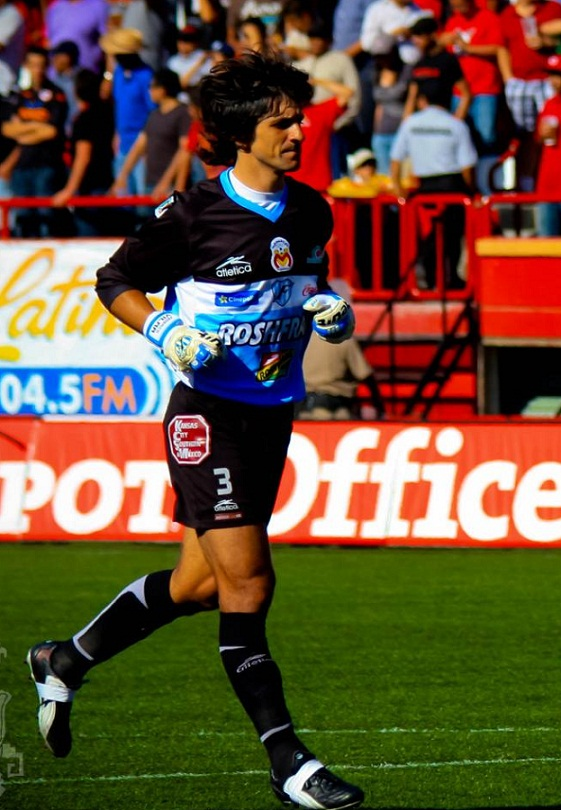
- Vilar playing for Morelia in 2011

Personal information
- Full name: Federico Vilar Baudena
- Date of birth: 30 May 1977 (age 49)
- Place of birth: Buenos Aires, Argentina
- Height: 1.81 m (5 ft 11 in)
- Position: Goalkeeper

Team information
- Current team: Atlante (Assistant)

Youth career
- 1993–2000: Boca Juniors

Senior career*
Years	Team	Apps	(Gls)
2000–2002	Almirante Brown	42	(0)
2003	Acapulco	18	(0)
2003–2010	Atlante	280	(2)
2010–2013	Morelia	136	(0)
2014–2015	Atlas	54	(0)
2015–2016	Tijuana	49	(0)
Total		579	(2)

Managerial career
- 2020: Argentino Rojas
- 2021–2022: Cancún
- 2022: Unión La Calera
- 2023: Arsenal de Sarandí
- 2026–: Atlante (Assistant)
- * Club domestic league appearances and goals

Federico Vilar Baudena (born 30 May 1977) is an Argentine football manager and former player who played as a goalkeeper.

Vilar played the majority of his career in Mexico where played for five different clubs. He also won four different titles and scored four goals all by free kicks. Vilar was known for his great reflexes and established himself as one of Mexico's best goalkeepers, his charisma and leadership ability has also earned him the title of team captain throughout his career.

== Career ==
Vilar began his career playing for Boca Juniors in Argentina from 1993 to 2000 and Almirante Brown from 2000 to 2001. He then migrated to Mexico and played for second division team Acapulco until making his debut in Mexico's First Division on 1 December 2003, against Monterrey.

Vilar played for Atlante for seven years where he won the Apertura 2007 league title, the 2008–09 CONCACAF Champions League, and played in the 2009 FIFA Club World Cup.

Vilar moved to Morelia in 2010 where he won the 2010 North American SuperLiga, reached the Clausura 2011 league final, and won the Apertura 2013 Copa MX. He later played for Atlas and Club Tijuana. Vilar announced his retirement in a press conference in Tijuana on 29 November 2016.

Throughout his career, Vilar wore the number 3 jersey as a tribute to his father, who played as a left-back.

=== Free Kicks ===
Vilar scored four goals in his five-year career at Atlante. The first one, against Necaxa, was scored on 1 February 2004. The second was scored on 12 August 2006, against Cruz Azul. He also scored a goal by free kick against the Chilean champion Colo-Colo during an exhibition match. Also, on 8 October 2008, he scored another goal from a free kick against CD Olimpia of Honduras in the CONCACAF Champions League.

== Honours ==
=== Player ===
Atlante

- Primera División de México (1): Apertura 2007
- CONCACAF Champions League (1): 2008–09

Morelia

- Copa MX (1): Apertura 2013
- North American SuperLiga (1): 2010
