= Mauricio Romero (Argentine footballer) =

Argentine footballer

Personal information
- Full name: Mauricio Martín Romero
- Date of birth: January 13, 1983 (age 43)
- Place of birth: General Pico, La Pampa, Argentina
- Height: 1.84 m (6 ft 0 in)
- Position: Defender

Youth career
- 1998-2002: Lanús

Senior career*
Years	Team	Apps	(Gls)
2002–2007	Lanús	119	(11)
2007–2012	Morelia	151	(16)
2013	Colón	12	(0)
2013–2014	Atlante	27	(0)
2014–2016	Puebla	30	(0)
2015	→ Sinaloa (loan)	10	(1)
2016–2017	Gimnasia LP	25	(2)
2017–2018	Agropecuario Argentino	10	(2)

International career
2003	Argentina U-20	13	(0)

Managerial career
- 2019-2021: CA Ferro Carril Oeste General Pico (assistant manager)
- 2021-: CA Ferro Carril Oeste General Pico
- * Club domestic league appearances and goals as of 2 November 2021

Mauricio Martín Romero (born January 13, 1983, in La Pampa) is a former Argentine football defender and current manager. He also holds Mexican citizenship.

== Career ==
=== Club career ===
Romero was captain of Morelia from the Clausura 2009 until the Apertura 2010 when Jaime Lozano was named captain. His last club was Club Agropecuario Argentino in the Primera B Nacional.

=== International career ===
He capped for Argentina Under-20 team at 2003 FIFA World Youth Championship.

=== Managerial career ===
After becoming assistant manager for a season starting in 2019, he became manager in August 2021 for CA Ferro Carril Oeste General Pico.

On 2 November 2021 during a third division away match against Huracan Las Heras at 1–3 in the 34 minute, whilst managing CA Ferro Carril Oeste General Pico he was shot in the shoulder.
