= Miguel Sabah =

Mexican footballer (born 1979)

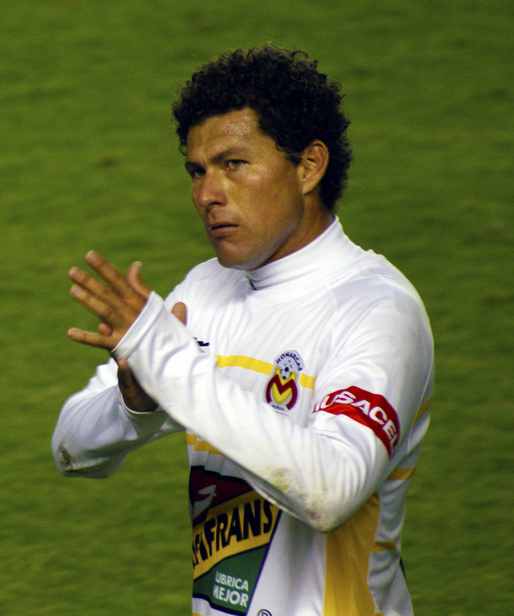
- Sabah playing for Morelia

Personal information
- Full name: Miguel Sabah Rodríguez
- Date of birth: 14 November 1979 (age 46)
- Place of birth: Cancún, Quintana Roo, Mexico
- Height: 1.75 m (5 ft 9 in)
- Position: Striker

Senior career*
| Years | Team | Apps | (Gls) |
| 2000–2005 | Guadalajara | 86 | (18) |
| 2006–2008 | Cruz Azul | 104 | (42) |
| 2009–2012 | Morelia | 132 | (64) |
| 2013 | Guadalajara | 25 | (3) |
| 2014–2015 | León | 45 | (12) |
| Total | | 392 | (139) |

International career
| 2009–2012 | Mexico | 17 | (5) |
Medal record
Representing Mexico
CONCACAF Gold Cup
| Winner | CONCACAF Gold Cup | 2009 |
- * Club domestic league appearances and goals

Miguel Sabah Rodríguez (born 14 November 1979) is a Mexican former professional footballer who played as a striker.

Throughout his career, he played for Guadalajara, Cruz Azul, Monarcas Morelia, and Club León. Sabah made his debut in the Invierno 2000 with Guadalajara entering in the 46th minute. Sabah played five years with Guadalajara until transferring to Cruz Azul in the Apertura 2006. Sabah was transferred to Morelia in the Clausura 2009, where he was the best Mexico-born goalscorer of the season with 11 goals. Sabah made 17 appearances for the Mexico national team and was the top scorer of the 2009 CONCACAF Gold Cup.

== Club career ==
=== Guadalajara ===
Sabah started his career with Club Deportivo Guadalajara, making his debut on 12 August 2000, coming in the 46th minute for Benjamin Galindo against his future team Cruz Azul. Although making his debut in the third game of the season, Sabah did not appear in any games until the Verano 2002 season. In the Verano 2002 season Sabah played in 16 games, including 11 starts, and scored three goals. His second full season with Guadalajara did not go very well, Sabah appeared in only six games and did not score any goals. The Clausura 2003 season was similar to the previous season, Sabah appeared in eight games, and scored no goals for the second consecutive season. Sabah improved in the 2003 Apertura 2003 season, appearing in 18 games, and scoring eight goals. Sabah appeared in 11 games the following season the season which Guadalajara reached the final. Sabah appeared in the first leg match against UNAM Pumas, coming in the 75th minute for Héctor Reynoso. He did not appear in the second leg match, eventually Chivas lost the final 5–4 in penalty kicks. In the Apertura 2004 season, Sabah would appear in 14 games, Sabah managed to score five goals, but got a red card against Atlante F.C. in the first game of the season. Without Sabah, Guadalajara defeated Atlante 7–0. Sabah appeared in 12 games combined in his last two seasons with Guadalajara. Sabah appeared in 86 games (starting 36) and scored 18 goals in nine seasons with Guadalajara.

=== Cruz Azul ===
Following the Apertura 2005 Sabah was transferred to Cruz Azul, which helped his career get going. His first season with Cruz Azul was solid, with Sabah scoring three goals and registering two assists. Sabah had a very good Apertura 2006 season; he appeared in 18 games, starting 15, and he scored ten goals. The Clausura 2007 season was not as good as the previous season for Sabah; he scored six goals in 17 games. The Apertura 2007 season was statistically the best season for Sabah with Cruz Azul. Sabah started all 17 games he played and scored 11 goals. Although Sabah only scored 11 goals in 37 games, Cruz Azul reached the final in Sabah's last two seasons with that club. Cruz Azul lost both of those finals, Clausura 2008 to Santos Laguna and Apertura 2008 to Deportivo Toluca.

=== Morelia ===
On 28 December 2008, Miguel Sabah was transferred to Monarcas Morelia. He was presented on 31 December. Sabah scored his first goal with Morelia on 31 January 2009, against América. The rest of the Clausura 2009 season for Sabah with Morelia has gone well. Sabah started out slow but has responded with 11 goals in 17 games, 15 in which he started. In his second tournament with Morelia, Sabah only appeared in 16 matches due to national team duty but still managed to score eight goals, including two in the playoffs. The Torneo Bicentenario 2010 was a very good season for Sabah as he finished with seven goals in 13 matches before he left for Mexico national team pre-World Cup training camp.

In the Clausura 2011 season, Sabah and teammate Rafael Márquez Lugo formed a dangerous attacking duo for a Morelia team who reached the league final. Between the two they scored a total of 17 goals for Morelia who eventually fell 3–2 on aggregate to UNAM.

In three years in Morelia, Sabah scored 64 goals, which makes him the club's third all-time scorer behind Marco Antonio Figueroa and Alex Fernandes, he is also the club's all time Mexico-born scorer.

=== Return to Guadalajara ===
Miguel Sabah transferred to his first club, Chivas on 14 December 2012 and was presented on 17 December 2012. On 6 January 2013, in the Fecha 1 in the Clausura 2013, Miguel Sabah scored his first goal in a 1–1 tie against Toluca. Later in that match he was sent off with a red card.

=== Leon ===
On 27 November 2013, Miguel Sabah was traded to Leon. During the 2014 Clausura season he managed to play key role in game against Santos Laguna, final score 4–2, where he had three assists and a goal. He then ended up becoming champions with Leon, giving him his first career Liga MX championship. On 29 November 2015, manager Juan Antonio Pizzi announced that Sabah as well as his teammate Gonzálo Ríos would not continue with the team for the Clausura 2016, both ended contract with the club.

=== Retirement ===
After being released by Leon, Sabah did not find a team in the Liga MX Draft and he eventually announced his retirement on 5 January 2016, in a press conference in Guadalajara. In 2017 Sabah started playing for Corinthians FC of San Antonio of the National Premier Soccer League.

== International career ==
Sabah was called up by the senior national team coach Javier Aguirre on 15 May 2009, for the 2010 World Cup qualifiers against El Salvador and Trinidad and Tobago. Sabah earned his first international cap against Trinidad and Tobago, coming in for Nery Castillo in the 34th minute. Aguirre included Sabah on the 2009 CONCACAF Gold Cup roster. Sabah scored his first international goal on 9 July 2009, against Panama, that goal was the 500th goal in CONCACAF Gold Cup history. On 12 August 2009, Sabah also scored a late winner against the United States in a crucial CONCACAF World Cup qualifying match. However, he was not on the final list for the 2010 FIFA World Cup due to an injury.

== Personal life ==
Miguel Sabah Rodríguez is of Lebanese descent on his father's side. He was born in Cancún, Mexico.

== Career statistics ==
=== Club ===
As of 19 August 2012

Appearances and goals by club, season and competition
| Club | Season | League | | | National cup | | League cup | | Continental | | Total | |
| Club | Season | Division | Apps | Goals | Apps | Goals | Apps | Goals | Apps | Goals | Apps | Goals |
|---|---|---|---|---|---|---|---|---|---|---|---|---|
| Guadalajara | 2000–01 | Primera División de México | 1 | 0 | | | | | | | 1 | 0 |
| Guadalajara | 2001–02 | Primera División de México | 16 | 3 | | | | | | | 16 | 3 |
| Guadalajara | 2002–03 | Primera División de México | 14 | 0 | | | | | | | 14 | 0 |
| Guadalajara | 2003–04 | Primera División de México | 29 | 10 | | | | | | | 29 | 10 |
| Guadalajara | 2004–05 | Primera División de México | 18 | 5 | | | | | | | 18 | 5 |
| Guadalajara | 2005–06 | Primera División de México | 8 | 0 | | | | | | | 8 | 0 |
| Cruz Azul | 2005–06 | Primera División de México | 15 | 3 | | | | | | | 15 | 3 |
| Cruz Azul | 2006–07 | Primera División de México | 35 | 16 | | | | | | | 35 | 16 |
| Cruz Azul | 2007–08 | Primera División de México | 34 | 19 | | | | | | | 34 | 19 |
| Cruz Azul | 2008–09 | Primera División de México | 20 | 4 | | | | | 8 | 2 | 28 | 6 |
| Morelia | 2008–09 | Primera División de México | 17 | 11 | | | | | | | 17 | 11 |
| Morelia | 2009–10 | Primera División de México | 29 | 15 | | | 2 | 0 | | | 31 | 15 |
| Morelia | 2010–11 | Primera División de México | 33 | 11 | | | 5 | 4 | 3 | 0 | 41 | 15 |
| Morelia | 2011–12 | Primera División de México | 36 | 18 | | | | | 6 | 3 | 42 | 21 |
| Career total | | | 305 | 115 | | | 7 | 4 | 17 | 5 | 329 | 124 |

=== International ===
As of match played 1 March 2012

Appearances and goals by national team and year
| National team | Year | Apps | Goals |
|---|---|---|---|
| Mexico | 2009 | 14 | 5 |
| Mexico | 2010 | 2 | 0 |
| Mexico | 2012 | 1 | 0 |
| Total | | 17 | 5 |

Scores and results list Mexico's goal tally first, score column indicates score after each Sabah goal.

List of international goals scored by Miguel Sabah
| No. | Date | Venue | Opponent | Score | Result | Competition | Ref. |
|---|---|---|---|---|---|---|---|
| 1 | 9 July 2009 | Reliant Stadium, Houston, United States | Panama | 1–0 | 1–1 | 2009 CONCACAF Gold Cup | |
| 2 | 12 July 2009 | University of Phoenix Stadium, Glendale, United States | Guadeloupe | 2–0 | 2–0 | 2009 CONCACAF Gold Cup | |
| 3 | 19 July 2009 | Cowboys Stadium, Arlington, United States | Haiti | 1–0 | 4–0 | 2009 CONCACAF Gold Cup | |
| 4 | 19 July 2009 | Cowboys Stadium, Arlington, United States | Haiti | 3–0 | 4–0 | 2009 CONCACAF Gold Cup | |
| 5 | 12 August 2009 | Estadio Azteca, Mexico City, Mexico | United States | 2–1 | 2–1 | 2010 FIFA World Cup qualification | |

== Honours ==
Morelia

- North American SuperLiga: 2010

León

- Liga MX: Clausura 2014

Mexico

- CONCACAF Gold Cup: 2009

Individual

- CONCACAF Gold Cup Golden Boot: 2009
- CONCACAF Gold Cup All-Tournament Team: 2009
- North American SuperLiga top scorer: 2010
