= 2012–13 Club Atlas season =

Atlas
2012–13 season
- Chairman: Carlos Martin Del Campo
- Manager: Juan Carlos Chávez (until August 27, 2012); Rubén Duarte (interim) (August 27, 2012–August 30, 2012); Tomás Boy (from August 30, 2012)
- Stadium: Estadio Jalisco
- Apertura 2012: 17th
- Clausura 2013: 3rd Final phase quarter-finals
- Copa MX (Apertura): Group stage
- Copa MX (Clausura): Quarter-finals
- Top goalscorer: League: Apertura: Héctor Mancilla (6); Clausura: Omar Bravo (7); All: Jahir Barraza (10)
- Highest home attendance: Apertura: 31,384 vs Toluca (September 29, 2012); Clausura: 46,706 vs Guadalajara (April 20, 2013)
- Lowest home attendance: Apertura: 9,000 vs Querétaro (September 15, 2012); 19,716 vs Atlante (February 9, 2013)
Home colours	Away colours

The 2012–13 Atlas season was the 66th professional season of Mexico's top-flight football league. The season is split into two tournaments—the Torneo Apertura and the Torneo Clausura—each with identical formats and each contested by the same eighteen teams. Atlas began their season on July 22, 2012 against UNAM, Atlas played their homes games on Saturdays at 9:00pm local time. Atlas did not qualify to the final phase in the Apertura tournament and was eliminated in the quarter-finals by Santos Laguna in the Clausura tournament.

== Tornero Apertura ==
=== Squad ===
Note: Flags indicate national team as defined under FIFA eligibility rules; some limited exceptions apply. Players may hold more than one non-FIFA nationality.

No.	Pos.	Nation	Player
1	GK	CHI	Miguel Pinto
2	DF	MEX	Hugo Isaác Rodríguez
3	DF	MEX	Luis Ramos
4	DF	MEX	Antonio Briseño
5	DF	ARG	Facundo Erpen
6	MF	MEX	Gregorio Torres
7	FW	MEX	Flavio Santos
8	MF	MEX	Lucas Ayala
9	FW	CHI	Hector Mancilla
10	MF	ECU	Luis Bolaños
11	FW	MEX	Sergio Santana
12	DF	MEX	Christian Sánchez
13	GK	MEX	Alejandro Gallardo
14	DF	MEX	Alexis Loera
15	MF	MEX	Arturo Alfonso González
16	DF	MEX	Sergio Amaury Ponce
17	MF	MEX	Luis Robles

No.	Pos.	Nation	Player
18	MF	MEX	Luis Telles
19	FW	MEX	Jahír Barraza
23	MF	MEX	Ricardo Bocanegra
24	MF	MEX	Alfredo Sánchez
25	DF	ARG	Leandro Cufré (Captain)
26	MF	MEX	Carlos Gutiérrez
27	MF	MEX	Cristian Díaz
28	MF	MEX	Luis Alonso Sandoval
29	FW	MEX	Alberto Pindter
30	FW	MEX	Vicente Matías Vuoso
32	DF	MEX	Guillermo Martín
40	MF	MEX	Manuel Correa
47	FW	MEX	Alejandro Leyva
53	FW	MEX	Martín Barragán
72	FW	MEX	Daniel Hernández
74	DF	MEX	Luis Fabián Guzmán
76	FW	MEX	Jorge Celada

=== Regular season ===
Win Draw Loss

==== Apertura 2012 results ====
July 21, 2012 Round 1	Atlas	1 – 1	UNAM	Guadalajara, Jalisco
21:00	Erepen (yellow card) 23' (yellow-red card) 90'; Ayala (yellow card) 28'; A. Palacios 86' (o.g.)	Report	Bravo 7'; Nieto (yellow card) 42'; García (yellow card) 52'; Romagnoli (yellow card) 65'; Villa (yellow card) 68'; Espinoza (yellow card) 90+3'	Stadium: Estadio Jalisco; Referee: Miguel Ángel Ortega

July 28, 2012 Round 2	Pachuca	0 – 3	Atlas	Pachuca, Hidalgo
19:00	Torres (yellow card) 44' (red card); Hernández (red card) 66'	Report	Ponce (yellow card) 34'; Mancilla (yellow card) 45+', (goal) 74'; Cufré (yellow card) 47'; Sandoval 50' da Silva 90' (o.g.)	Stadium: Estadio Hidalgo; Referee: Antony Zanjuampa

August 4, 2012 Round 3	Atlas	0 – 0	UANL	Guadalajara, Jalisco
21:00	Cufré (yellow card) 28'	Report		Stadium: Estadio Jalisco; Attendance: 24,119; Referee: Óscar Macias

August 11, 2012 Round 4	América	1 – 1	Atlas	Mexico City
17:00	Medina (yellow card) 53'; Sambueza (yellow card) 71', (goal) 74'	Report	Rodríguez 45+'; Telles (yellow card) 46'; Cufré (yellow card) 86'	Stadium: Estadio Azteca; Attendance: 27,900; Referee: Miguel Ángel Ayala

August 18, 2012 Round 5	Atlas	1 – 1	Chiapas	Guadalajara, Jalisco
21:00	Santana 39'; Ayala (yellow card) 77'	Report	Arizala 65'; Trujillo (yellow card) 77' (yellow-red card) 90+1'; Esqueda (yellow card) 90+3'	Stadium: Estadio Jalisco; Attendance: 13,750; Referee: César Arturo Ramos

August 26, 2012 Round 6	Atlante	1 – 0	Atlas	Cancún, Quintana Roo
18:00	O. Martínez 42'	Report		Stadium: Estadio Andrés Quintana Roo; Attendance: 5,468; Referee: Marco Antonio Rodríguez

September 1, 2012 Round 7	Monterrey	1 – 1	Atlas	Monterrey, Nuevo León
19:00	Cardozo 5'; Chávez (yellow card) 21'; Mier (yellow card) 60'	Report	Bocanegra (yellow card) 41'; Barraza 70'; Sandoval (yellow card) 75'; Robles (yellow card) 78'; Rodríguez (yellow card) 82'	Stadium: Estadio Tecnológico; Attendance: 33,251; Referee: Jorge Isaac Rojas

September 15, 2012 Round 8	Atlas	0 – 0	Querétaro	Guadalajara, Jalisco
21:00	Ayala (yellow card) 79'; Vuoso (yellow card) 82'; Torres (red card) 85'	Report	Echevarría (yellow card) 1'; Rippa (yellow card) 67'; Pineda (yellow card) 79'	Stadium: Estadio Jalisco; Attendance: 9,000; Referee: Ricardo Arellano

September 22, 2012 Round 9	Tijuana	1 – 1	Atlas	Tijuana, Baja California
19:30	Riascos 75'	Report	Mancilla 30'; Santos (yellow card) 36'; Pinto (yellow card) 53'; Ponce (yellow card) 89'	Stadium: Estadio Caliente; Attendance: 22,333; Referee: Erim Ramírez

September 29, 2012 Round 10	Atlas	1 – 3	Toluca	Guadalajara, Jalisco
21:00	Bolaños (yellow card) 58'; Mancilla 83', (yellow card) 86'	Report	Tejada (yellow card) 14', (goal) 24'; Sinha 19'; Wilson Mathías 90+4'	Stadium: Estadio Jalisco; Attendance: 31,384; Referee: Fabricio Morales

October 3, 2012 Round 11	Santos Laguna	2 – 1	Atlas	Torreón, Coahuila
20:00	Alanis (yellow card) 3'; Peralta 10', (yellow card) 83'; Ramírez 39'; Crosas (yellow card) 77'	Report	Mancilla 3' (pen.); Bocanegra (yellow card) 44' (yellow-red card) 66'; Vigón (yellow card) 48'	Stadium: Estadio TSM Corona; Attendance: 20,699; Referee: Roberto García Orozco

October 6, 2012 Round 12	Atlas	1 – 1	Cruz Azul	Guadalajara, Jalisco
21:00	Vuoso 30'; Torres (yellow card) 89'	Report	A. Castro (yellow card) 46'; Bravo 56'; Pavone (yellow card) 79'; Torrado (yellow card) 81'; Perea (yellow card) 87'	Stadium: Estadio Jalisco; Attendance: 22,960; Referee: Luis Enrique Santander

October 23, 2012 Round 13	Morelia	2 – 0	Atlas	Morelia, Michoacán
20:30	Rojas 31'; Torres 73'; Ramírez (yellow card) 90+2'	Report	Rodríguez (yellow card) 35'; Mancilla (yellow card) 63'; Barraza (yellow card) 68'; Vigón (red card) 77'; Boy (red card) 90+2' (manager)	Stadium: Estadio Morelos; Attendance: 13,223; Referee: Marco Antonio Rodríguez

October 20, 2012 Round 14	Atlas	2 – 3	San Luis	Guadalajara, Jalisco
21:00	Mancilla 24'; Robles (yellow card) 39'; Sandoval (yellow card) 57'; Erpen 65', (yellow card) 89'; Pinto (yellow card) 67'	Report	Orozco (yellow card) 28'; Cerda 46'; Erpen 52' (o.g.); Arredondo (yellow card) 53'; López (yellow card) 57'; Velasco (yellow card) 72'; Tréllez 82'	Stadium: Estadio Jalisco; Attendance: 20,622; Referee: Jorge Antonio Pérez

October 28, 2012 Round 15	Guadalajara	2 – 0	Atlas	Zapopan, Jalisco
17:00	Márquez 11'; Fabián 40'; Arrellano (yellow card) 71'; Ponce (yellow card) 87'	Report	Rodríguez (yellow card) 48' (yellow-red card) 72'; Robles (yellow card) 50'; Mancilla (yellow card) 78'; Erpen (yellow card) 81'	Stadium: Estadio Omnilife; Attendance: 33,820; Referee: Óscar Macias

November 4, 2012 Round 16	Atlas	2 – 2	Puebla	Guadalajara, Jalisco
16:00	Torres 8'; Cufré (yellow card) 35'; González 41'; Santana (red card) 83'; Vusoso (yellow card) 84'	Report	Alustiza 34' (pen.); Durán (yellow card) 75'; Polo 90+4'	Stadium: Estadio Jalisco; Referee: José Alfredo Peñaloza

November 9, 2012 Round 17	León	3 – 1	Atlas	León, Guanajuato
21:30	Loboa 15'; Delgado (yellow card) 22'; Britos (yellow card) 31', (goal) 33'; Maz 59' (pen.); Nieves (yellow card) 87'	Report	Erpen (yellow card) 19'; Robles (yellow card) 52'; Santos (yellow card) 54'; Cufré (yellow card) 60'; Mancilla 76'	Stadium: Estadio León; Attendance: 35,000+ Referee: Roberto García Orozco

=== Goalscorers ===
Position	Nation	Name	Goals scored
1.	(Chile)	Héctor Mancilla	6
2.		Own Goal	2
3.	(Mexico)	Jahir Barraza	1
3.	(Argentina)	Facundo Erpen	1
3.	(Mexico)	Arturo González	1
3.	(Mexico)	Hugo Isaác Rodríguez	1
3.	(Mexico)	Luis Alonso Sandoval	1
3.	(Mexico)	Sergio Santana	1
3.	(Mexico)	Gregorio Torres	1
3.	(Mexico)	Vicente Matías Vuoso	1
TOTAL			16

=== Results ===
==== Results summary ====
Overall								Home						Away					
Pld	W	D	L	GF	GA	GD	Pts	W	D	L	GF	GA	GD	W	D	L	GF	GA	GD
17	1	9	7	16	24	−8	12	0	6	2	7	10	−3	1	3	5	9	14	−5

Last updated: 10 November 2012.
Source: Apertura 2012 results

==== Results by round ====
Round	1	2	3	4	5	6	7	8	9	10	11	12	13	14	15	16	17
Ground	H	A	H	A	H	A	A	H	A	H	A	H	A	H	H	H	A
Result	D	W	D	D	D	L	D	D	D	L	L	D	L	L	L	D	L
Position	6	5	6	7	8	11	12	13	12	14	15	16	16	17	17	17	17

Updated to match(es) played on 10 November 2012. Source: Apertura 2012 results and mediotiempo.com
A = Away; H = Home; W = Win; D = Draw; L = Loss

== Apertura 2012 Copa MX ==
=== Group stage ===
Win Draw Loss

==== Apertura results ====
July 25, 2012 1	Altamira	3 – 2	Atlas	Altamira, Tamaulipas
21:00	Morales 18'; Ríos (yellow card) 19'; Sánchez 27'; Lillo 29', (yellow card) 88'; Meza (yellow card) 39'; Palafox (yellow card) 55'; Rodríguez (yellow card) 88'	Report	Barraza 5', 76'	Stadium: Estadio Altamira; Referee: Christian Espinoza

July 31, 2012 2	Atlas	1 – 1	Altamira	Guadalajara, Jalisco
21:00	Bocanegra (yellow card) 17'; Bolaños (yellow card) 53'; Santos 73' (pen.)	Report	del Moral 57'; Sánchez (yellow card) 69'; Cuevas (yellow card) 72'; González (yellow card) 88'	Stadium: Estadio Jalisco; Referee: Erim Ramírez

August 8, 2012 3	Atlas	1 – 1	Neza	Guadalajara, Jalisco
21:00	Bolaños 25'	Report	Guzmán 9'; Cariño (yellow card) 32'; Reyes (yellow card) 65'; Prieto (yellow card) 87'	Stadium: Estadio Jalisco; Attendance: 7,113; Referee: Luis Enrique Santander

August 22, 2012 4	Neza	2 – 1	Atlas	Ciudad Nezahualcóyotl, Estado de Mexico
16:00	Sansores 9'; Loeschbor (yellow card) 15'; Nungaray (yellow card) 54'; Pineda 90+2'	Report	Barraza 11'; Santos (yellow card) 79'; Bocanegra (yellow card) 90+2'	Stadium: Estadio Neza 86; Referee: Jorge Tonix

August 29, 2012 5	Atlas	1 – 0	Cruz Azul	Guadalajara, Jalisco
21:00	Barraza 5'; Santos (yellow card) 68'; Bocanegra (yellow card) 72'	Report	Bravo (yellow card) 65'	Stadium: Estadio Jalisco; Attendance: 8,524; Referee: Miguel Ángel Ortega

September 18, 2012 6	Cruz Azul	1 – 1	Atlas	Mexico City
21:00	Orozco 11'; Gutiérrez (yellow card) 55' (yellow-red card) 71'	Report	Santana 28'; Bolaños (yellow card) 35'; Gallardo (yellow card) 61'; Bocanegra (yellow card) 72'; Sánchez (yellow card) 78'	Stadium: Estadio Azul; Attendance: 4,095; Referee: Víctor Bisguerra

=== Goalscorers ===
Position	Nation	Name	Goals scored
1.	(Mexico)	Jahir Barraza	4
2.	(Ecuador)	Luis Bolaños	1
2.	(Mexico)	Sergio Santana	1
2.	(Mexico)	Flavio Santos	1
TOTAL			7

=== Results ===
==== Results by round ====
Round	1	2	3	4	5	6
Ground	A	H	H	A	H	A
Result	L	D	W	L	W	D
Position	3	4	4	4	4	4

Updated to match(es) played on 18 September 2012. Source: Apertura results and mediotiempo.com
A = Away; H = Home; W = Win; D = Draw; L = Loss

== Tornero Clausura ==
=== Squad ===
Note: Flags indicate national team as defined under FIFA eligibility rules; some limited exceptions apply. Players may hold more than one non-FIFA nationality.

No.	Pos.	Nation	Player
1	GK	CHI	Miguel Pinto
2	DF	MEX	Jesús Arturo Paganoni
3	DF	MEX	Luis Ramos
4	DF	MEX	Antonio Briseño
5	DF	ARG	Facundo Erpen
6	MF	MEX	Gregorio Torres
7	DF	MEX	Óscar Razo
8	MF	MEX	Lucas Ayala (vice-captain)
9	FW	MEX	Omar Bravo
10	MF	BOL	José Luis Chávez
11	FW	MEX	Edson Rivera
12	GK	MEX	Alejandro Gallardo
14	DF	MEX	Alexis Loera
15	MF	MEX	Arturo González
16	DF	MEX	Sergio Amaury Ponce
17	DF	MEX	Luis Robles
18	MF	MEX	Luis Télles
19	FW	MEX	Jahír Barraza
20	MF	CHI	Rodrigo Millar

No.	Pos.	Nation	Player
21	GK	MEX	Alan López
22	MF	MEX	Juan Pablo Vigón
23	MF	MEX	Ricardo Bocanegra
24	MF	MEX	Alfredo Sánchez
25	DF	ARG	Leandro Cufré (captain)
26	MF	MEX	Carlos Gutiérrez Armas
27	MF	MEX	Isaác Brizuela
28	MF	MEX	Luis Alonso Sandoval
29	FW	MEX	Alberto Pindter
30	FW	MEX	Vicente Matías Vuoso
31	DF	MEX	Rogelio Osuna
32	DF	MEX	Guillermo Martín
34	DF	MEX	Julio César Betancio
36	MF	MEX	Carlos Treviño
56	DF	MEX	Jesús Figueroa
106	MF	MEX	Luis Reyes
111	FW	MEX	Martín Barragán
120	MF	MEX	Omar Santoyo
128	FW	MEX	Francisco León

=== Regular season ===
Win Draw Loss

==== Clausura 2013 results ====
January 6, 2013 Round 1	UNAM	1 – 1	Atlas	Coyoacán, Mexico City
12:00	Bravo 36'; Verón (yellow card) 67'	Report	Razo (yellow card) 8'; Erpen (yellow card) 39'; Bravo 79'	Stadium: Estadio Olímpico Universitario; Attendance: 22,212; Referee: Luis Enrique Santander

January 12, 2013 Round 2	Atlas	2 – 0	Pachuca	Guadalajara, Jalisco
21:00	Bocanegra (yellow card) 22'; Bravo 35'; Vuoso 65'; Ayala (yellow card) 70'; Razo (red card) 86'; Pinto (yellow card) 90+1'	Report	Bueno (yellow card) 4'; H. Herrera (yellow card) 27' da Silva (yellow card) 35'; Ludueña (yellow card) 49'; Hurtado (yellow card) 63'	Stadium: Estadio Jalisco; Attendance: 29,213; Referee: José Alfredo Peñaloza

January 19, 2013 Round 3	UANL	1 – 0	Atlas	San Nicolás de los Garzas, Nuevo León
19:00	Villa 36'	Report	Cufré (yellow card) 23'; Torres (yellow card) 59'; Erpen (yellow card) 65'; Millar (yellow card) 90+2'	Stadium: Estadio Universitario; Referee: Paul Delgadillo

January 26, 2013 Round 4	Atlas	2 – 1	América	Guadalajara, Jalisco
21:00	Cufré (yellow card) 40'; Millar 46'; Bravo 73' (pen.)	Report	F. Rodríguez (yellow card) 4'; Reyes 42', (yellow card) 72'; Mosquera (yellow card) 46'	Stadium: Estadio Jalisco; Attendance: 34,041; Referee: Erim Ramírez

February 1, 2013 Round 5	Chiapas	1 – 2	Atlas	Tuxtla Gutiérrez, Chiapas
19:30	Esqueda (yellow card) 23'; Rey 88' (pen.)	Report	Brizuela 10', (yellow card) 54'; Martín (yellow card) 66'; Cufré (yellow card) 73'; Barraza 82'; Razo (yellow card) 87'	Stadium: Estadio Victor Manuel Reyna; Attendance: 8,600; Referee: Miguel Ángel Flores

February 9, 2013 Round 6	Atlas	2 – 1	Atlante	Guadalajara, Jalisco
21:00	Barraza 5'; Cufré (yellow card) 13'; Millar (yellow card) 46'; Razo (yellow card) 63'; Rivera 67'	Report	Erpen 54' (o.g.); Ordaz (yellow card) 89'	Stadium: Estadio Jalisco; Attendance: 19,716; Referee: Francisco Chacón

February 16, 2013 Round 7	Atlas	2 – 1	Monterrey	Guadalajara, Jalisco
21:00	Chávez 36'; Bravo 54'	Report	Arellano 7'; Ayoví (yellow card) 14'; Suazo (yellow card) 21'	Stadium: Estadio Jalisco; Referee: Jorge Antonio Pérez

February 23, 2013 Round 8	Querétaro	0 – 0	Atlas	Querétaro, Querétaro
17:00	Landín (yellow card) 39'; Escalante (yellow card) 79'	Report	Millar (yellow card) 28'	Stadium: Estadio Corregidora; Attendance: 21,900; Referee: Marco Antonio Rodríguez

March 2, 2013 Round 9	Atlas	1 – 0	Tijuana	Guadalajara, Jalisco
21:00	Bravo 3'; Chávez (yellow card) 39'; Cufré (yellow card) 50'; Vuoso (yellow card) 63'; Brizuela (yellow card) 80'; Ayala (yellow card) 90+3'	Report	Gandolfi (yellow card) 17'; Arce (yellow card) 20'; Pellerano (yellow card) 49'; Martínez (yellow card) 76' (yellow-red card) 87'; Ábrego (yellow card) 85'	Stadium: Estadio Jalisco; Attendance: 39,184; Referee: César Arturo Ramos

March 10, 2013 Round 10	Toluca	0 – 1	Atlas	Toluca, Estado de México
12:00	Lucas Silva (yellow card) 34'; Gamboa (yellow card) 47'; Novaretti (yellow card) 60'	Report	Ayala (yellow card) 9'; Millar 81', (yellow card) 81'	Stadium: Estadio Nemesio Díez; Attendance: 12,678; Referee: Roberto García Orozco

March 16, 2013 Round 11	Atlas	1 – 2	Santos Laguna	Guadalajara, Jalisco
21:00	Vuoso (yellow card) 27'; Ayala (yellow card) 39'; Erpen (yellow card) 41'; Bravo 63' (pen.); Cufré (yellow card) 72'	Report	Gómez (yellow card) 22'; Quintero (yellow card) 41', (goal) 88'; Baloy (yellow card) 62'; Ramírez (yellow card) 74'; Salinas 79'	Stadium: Estadio Jalisco; Attendance: 37,510; Referee: Fabricio Morales

March 30, 2013 Round 12	Cruz Azul	1 – 2	Atlas	Benito Juárez, Mexico City
17:00	Flores (yellow card) 19'; Pavone (yellow card) 30'; Castro 51'; Barrera (yellow card) 58'; Perea (yellow card) 90+1'	Report	Chávez (yellow card) 31'; Ramos 38'; Vuoso 54'; Ayala (yellow card) 90+2'	Stadium: Estadio Azul; Attendance: 28,187; Referee: Miguel Ángel Ayala

April 6, 2013 Round 13	Atlas	0 – 0	Morelia	Guadalajara, Jalisco
21:00	Vuoso (yellow card) 61'	Report	Huiqui (yellow card) 21'; Valdez (yellow card) 36'	Stadium: Estadio Jalisco; Attendance: 33,378; Referee: Erim Ramírez

April 13, 2013 Round 14	San Luis	2 – 2	Atlas	San Luis Potosí, San Luis Potosí
21:00	Cuevas (yellow card) 17'; Muñoz (yellow card) 36'; Zepeda 77'; Matos 90'	Report	Vuoso 31'; Paganoni (yellow card) 71'; Briuzela 90+3'	Stadium: Estadio Alfonso Lastras; Attendance: 22,496; Referee: César Arturo Ramos

April 20, 2013 Round 15	Atlas	1 – 0	Guadalajara	Guadalajara, Jalisco
16:00	Cufré (yellow card) 11'; Millar 29'; Chávez (yellow card) 45'	Report	Sánchez (yellow card) 1'; Márquez (yellow card) 17' (yellow-red card) 17'; Sabah (yellow card) 18'; Torres (yellow card) 90'	Stadium: Estadio Jalisco; Attendance: 46,706; Referee: Paul Delgadillo

April 28, 2013 Round 16	Puebla	1 – 1	Atlas	Puebla, Puebla
12:00	Vuoso 80'	Report	Lacerda 84'	Stadium: Estadio Cuauhtémoc; Attendance: 37,363; Referee: José Alfredo Peñaloza

May 4, 2013 Round 17	Atlas	0 – 1	León	Guadalajara, Jalisco
21:00	Millar (yellow card) 22'; Erpen (yellow card) 38'; Razo (yellow card) 64'	Report	Britos 54'; Montes (yellow card) 80'	Stadium: Estadio Jalisco; Attendance: 33,951; Referee: Marco Antonio Rodríguez

=== Final phase ===
May 9, 2013 Quarter-finals	Santos Laguna	0 – 0	Atlas	Torreón, Coahuila
19:00	Baloy (yellow card) 90'	Report	Erpen (yellow card) 58'; Ayala (yellow card) 69'	Stadium: Estadio Corona; Attendance: 19,856; Referee: César Arturo Ramos

May 12, 2013 Quarter-finals	Atlas	1 – 3	Santos Laguna	Guadalajara, Jalisco
20:00	Bravo 5'; Erpen (yellow card) 23'; Pinto (red card) 24'; Cufré (yellow card) 88'	Report	Rentería (yellow card) 6', (goal) 15'; Sánchez (yellow card) 7'; Cejas (yellow card) 21'; Gómez (yellow card) 43'; Quintero 62', 89'	Stadium: Estadio Jalisco; Attendance: 43,250; Referee: Jorge Antonio Pérez

Santos Laguna advanced 3–1 on aggregate

=== Goalscorers ===
==== Regular season ====
Position	Nation	Name	Goals scored
1.	(Mexico)	Omar Bravo	6
2.	(Mexico)	Vicente Matías Vuoso	4
3.	(Chile)	Rodrigo Millar	3
4.	(Mexico)	Jahir Barraza	2
4.	(Mexico)	Isaác Brizuela	2
6.	(Bolivia)	José Luis Chávez	1
6.	(Mexico)	Luis Manuel Ramos	1
6.	(Mexico)	Édson Rivera	1
TOTAL			20

==== Final phase ====
Position	Nation	Name	Goals scored
1.	(Mexico)	Omar Bravo	1
TOTAL			1

=== Results ===
==== Results summary ====
Overall								Home						Away					
Pld	W	D	L	GF	GA	GD	Pts	W	D	L	GF	GA	GD	W	D	L	GF	GA	GD
17	9	5	3	20	12	+8	32	6	1	2	11	5	+6	3	4	1	9	7	+2

Last updated: 4 May 2013.
Source: Clausura 2013 results

==== Results by round ====
Round	1	2	3	4	5	6	7	8	9	10	11	12	13	14	15	16	17
Ground	A	H	A	H	A	H	H	A	H	A	H	A	H	A	H	A	H
Result	D	W	L	W	W	W	W	D	W	W	L	W	D	D	W	D	L
Position	11	5	8	6	4	4	3	2	2	2	2	2	2	2	2	3	3

Updated to match(es) played on 4 May 2013. Source: Clausura 2013 results and mediotiempo.com
A = Away; H = Home; W = Win; D = Draw; L = Loss

== Clausura 2013 Copa MX ==
=== Group stage ===
Win Draw Loss

==== Clausura results ====
January 16, 2013 1	Irapuato	0 – 2	Atlas	Irapuato, Guanajuato
21:00	Guillén (yellow card) 30'; Rodríguez (yellow card) 65'; Rocha (yellow card) 72'; Barrón (yellow card) 88'	Report	León (yellow card) 48'; Télles 50'; Martín (yellow card) 61'; Barraza 87', (yellow card) 87'	Stadium: Estadio Sergio León Chávez; Attendance: 6,920; Referee: Ángel Monroy

January 23, 2013 2	Atlas	2 – 2	Irapuato	Guadalajara, Jalisco
19:00	Sandoval 29', 32'; Gallardo (yellow card) 51'; Martín (red card) 72'	Report	Ayoví 6' (pen.), 57', (yellow card) 44'; Brown (yellow card) 13'; Razo (yellow card) 34'	Stadium: Estadio Jalisco; Attendance: 10,990; Referee: Víctor Bisguerra Mendiola

February 12, 2013 3	BUAP	0 – 2	Atlas	Puebla, Puebla
21:00	Alférez (yellow card) 22'; Martínez (yellow card) 59'; Dudu Paraíba (yellow card) 74'	Report	Torres (yellow card) 66', (goal) 89'; Rivera 90+1'	Stadium: Estadio Universitario BUAP; Attendance: 9,242; Referee: Marco Antonio Ortiz

February 19, 2013 4	Atlas	0 – 0	BUAP	Guadalajara, Jalisco
21:00	Sandoval (yellow card) 13'; Robles (yellow card) 36'; Vigón (yellow card) 54'; Torres (yellow card) 75'	Report	Cruzalta (yellow card) 13'; Sánchez (yellow card) 24'; Diego (yellow card) 75'	Stadium: Estadio Jalisco; Attendance: 8,615; Referee: Oscar Macías Romo

February 27, 2013 5	Cruz Azul	2 – 1	Atlas	Benito Juárez, Mexico City
21:00	Chávez (yellow card) 31'; Gutiérrez 45+1', 56'; Lara (yellow card) 76'	Report	Barraza 8'; Torres (yellow card) 39' (yellow-red card) 44'; Bocanegra (yellow card) 63'	Stadium: Estadio Azul; Attendance: 3,953; Referee: Miguel Ángel Ortega

March 6, 2013 6	Atlas	3 – 1	Cruz Azul	Guadalajara, Jalisco
21:00	Gutiérrez 19'; Vuoso 33'; Barraza 53'; Paganoni (yellow card) 63'	Report	Orozco 6'; Flores (yellow card) 18'; Bello (yellow card) 50'; Lara (yellow card) 64'	Stadium: Estadio Jalisco; Attendance: 9,827; Referee: Miguel Ángel Chacón

=== Knockout stage ===
March 13, 2013 Quarter-finals	Atlante	0 – 0 (3 – 2 p)	Atlas	Cancún, Quintana Roo
21:15	Jiménez (yellow card) 40'; Quiroz (yellow card) 41'; García (yellow card) 56'; Fonseca (yellow card) 69'; Amione (yellow card) 83'	Report	Robles (yellow card) 38'	Stadium: Estadio Andrés Quintana Roo; Attendance: 4,907; Referee: Miguel Ángel Ayala
	Penalties
	Diego Rafael Jiménez (penalty missed); Nápoles (penalty scored); Diego Octavio Jiménez (penalty scored); Calvo (penalty missed); Fonseca (penalty scored)		(penalty missed) Barraza; (penalty scored) Gutiérrez; (penalty missed) Bocanegra; (penalty scored) Robles; (penalty missed) Paganoni

=== Goalscorers ===
Position	Nation	Name	Goals scored
1.	(Mexico)	Jahir Barraza	3
2.	(Mexico)	Luis Alonso Sandoval	2
3.	(Mexico)	Carlos Gutiérrez	1
3.	(Mexico)	Édson Rivera	1
3.	(Mexico)	Luis Fernando Télles	1
3.	(Mexico)	Gregorio Torres	1
3.	(Mexico)	Vicente Matías Vuoso	1
TOTAL			10

=== Results ===
==== Results by round ====
Round	1	2	3	4	5	6
Ground	A	H	A	H	A	H
Result	W	D	W	D	L	W
Position	1	2	1	2	2	2

Updated to match(es) played on 6 March 2013. Source: Clausura results and mediotiempo.com
A = Away; H = Home; W = Win; D = Draw; L = Loss
