= 2011–12 Club Atlas season =

Atlas
2011–12 season
- Chairman: Carlos Martin Del Campo
- Manager: Rubén Omar Romano (June 12, 2011–Sep. 17, 2011); Juan Carlos Chávez (from Sep. 18, 2011)
- Stadium: Estadio Jalisco
- Apertura 2011: 18th
- Clausura 2012: 11th
- Top goalscorer: League: Apertura: Jahir Barraza; Mauricio Romero; Francisco Torres (3); Clausura: Giancarlo Maldonado; Hugo Isaác Rodríguez; Flavio Santos (2); All: Hugo Isaác Rodríguez; Flavio Santos (4)
Home colours	Away colours	Third colours

The 2011–12 Atlas season was the 65th professional season of Mexico's top-flight football league. The season was split into two tournaments—the Torneo Apertura and the Torneo Clausura—each with identical formats and each contested by the same eighteen teams. Atlas began their season on 23 July 2011 against Puebla. Atlas played their home games on Saturdays at 20:45 local time.

== Torneo Apertura ==
=== Squad ===
Note: Flags indicate national team as defined under FIFA eligibility rules; some limited exceptions apply. Players may hold more than one non-FIFA nationality.

No.	Pos.	Nation	Player
1	GK	CHI	Miguel Pinto
2	DF	MEX	Ricardo Jiménez
3	DF	MEX	Néstor Vidrio
4	MF	MEX	Luis Robles
5	DF	URU	Jonathan Lacerda
6	MF	MEX	Francisco Torres
7	FW	MEX	Flavio Santos
8	MF	MEX	Lucas Ayala
10	MF	VEN	Jesús Meza
11	FW	URU	Gastón Puerari
12	DF	MEX	Daniel Arreola
14	FW	MEX	Mauricio Romero
15	DF	MEX	Alfredo González Tahuilán

No.	Pos.	Nation	Player
16	MF	MEX	Alonso Zamora
17	FW	HON	Georgie Welcome
18	DF	MEX	Jesús Arturo Paganoni
19	MF	MEX	Saúl Villalobos
20	DF	MEX	Hugo Rodríguez
21	GK	MEX	Alejandro Gallardo
22	MF	MEX	Guillermo Rojas
23	MF	MEX	Ricardo Bocanegra
24	GK	MEX	José Francisco Canales
29	DF	MEX	Guillermo Martín
28	FW	MEX	Jahir Barraza
31	MF	MEX	Jonathan Piña

Out on loan: Note: Flags indicate national team as defined under FIFA eligibility rules; some limited exceptions apply. Players may hold more than one non-FIFA nationality.

No. / Pos. / Nation / Player; — / FW / BRA / Rômulo (loan to Guarani)	No. / Pos. / Nation / Player; — / FW / URU / Gonzalo Vargas (loan to Argentinos Juniors)

Win Draw Loss

=== Regular season ===
==== Apertura 2011 results ====
July 23, 2011 Round 1	Atlas	0 – 1	Puebla	Estadio Jalisco, Guadalajara
20:45	Lacerda (yellow card) 11'; Vidrio (yellow card) 53'	Report	Juárez (yellow card) 42'; Luis García 54'; Lucas Silva (yellow card) 59' (yellow-red card) 69'; Rodríguez (yellow card) 83'	Referee: Mauricio Morales

July 30, 2011 Round 2	Cruz Azul	2 – 1	Atlas	Estadio Azul, Mexico City
17:00	Ponce (yellow card) 38'; Cortés 47'; Aquino (yellow card) 59'; Villa 71'	Report	Rodríguez 33'; Vidrio (yellow card) 38'	Referee: Fernando Guerrero

August 3, 2011 Round 3	Atlas	3 – 0	Querétaro	Estadio Jalisco, Guadalajara
20:45	Torres (yellow card) 34', (goal) 40', 80'; Lacerda (yellow card) 35'; Welcome (yellow card) 51'; Pinto (yellow card) 52'; Romero 88'; Vidrio (yellow card) 90'	Report	Mondragón (yellow card) 34'; Bueno (yellow card) 43'; Sánchez (yellow card) 60'; Mena (yellow card) 90'	Referee: Miguel Ángel Ortega

August 7, 2011 Round 4	Toluca	0 – 0	Atlas	Estadio Nemesio Díez, Toluca
12:00	Novaretti (yellow card) 18'; Esquivel (yellow card) 24'; Dueñas (yellow card) 44'; Romagnoli (yellow card) 58' de la Torre (yellow card) 71'	Report	Ayala (yellow card) 40'; Welcome (yellow card) 48'; Vidrio (yellow card) 63'; Rodríguez (yellow card) 64'; Romero (red card) 90+1'	Referee: Antony Zanjuampa

August 13, 2011 Round 5	Atlas	0 – 2	Estudiantes Tecos	Estadio Jalisco, Guadalajara
20:45	Welcome (yellow card) 57'; Lacerda (yellow card) 67'; Rodríguez (yellow card) 81'	Report	Leaño (yellow card) 6'; Davino 42'; Rangel (yellow card) 45'; Lillingston 86'	Referee: Fabricio Morales

August 21, 2011 Round 6	América	5 – 2	Atlas	Estadio Azteca, Mexico City
16:00	Reyna 44'; Sánchez 53'; Molina (yellow card) 55'; Benítez 69', 77', 90+2'; Mosquera (yellow card) 82'	Report	Vidrio (yellow card) 7'; Welcome 10'; Lacerda (yellow card) 33'; Zamora (yellow card) 71'; Santos 81'	Referee: Erim Ramírez

August 27, 2011 Round 7	Atlas	0 – 1	UANL	Estadio Jalisco, Guadalajara
20:45	Vidrio (yellow card) 55' (red card) 86'; Mendoza (red card) 90'	Report	Álvarez (yellow card) 19', (goal) 22'; Rivas (yellow card) 37'	Referee: Francisco Chacón

September 10, 2011 Round 8	Atlas	1 – 1	San Luis	Estadio Jalisco, Guadalajara
20:45	Ayala (yellow card) 25'; Romero 36'	Report	Ambríz (red card) 23' (manager); Torres (yellow card) 54'; Arroyo 58'; Chiapas (yellow card) 60'; Matellán (yellow card) 90+1'	Referee: Fernando Guerrero

September 17, 2011 Round 9	Pachuca	4 – 2	Atlas	Estadio Hidalgo, Pachuca
19:00	Cervantes (yellow card) 22' (yellow-red card) 57'; Esqueda 32', (yellow card) 57'; Rodríguez 33'; Castillo 52'; López 90+2' (pen.)	Report	Romero 15'; Torres 32'; Ayala (yellow card) 41'; Vidrio (yellow card) 73'; Zamora (yellow card) 76'	Referee: Marco Antonio Rodríguez

September 24, 2011 Round 10	Atlas	2 – 3	Atlante	Estadio Jalisco, Guadalajara
20:45	Rodríguez 13', (yellow card) 29'; Meza (yellow card) 33'; Bocanegra 50', (yellow card) 51'	Report	Maldonado 24'; Martínez 31' (pen.); Guerrero (yellow card) 45'; Venegas (yellow card) 68'; Fonseca 79'	Referee: Jorge Antonio Pérez

September 30, 2011 Round 11	Chiapas	1 – 1	Atlas	Estadio Victor Manuel Reyna, Tuxtla Gutierrez
19:45	Rey 34', (yellow card) 90'; Espinoza (yellow card) 46'; J. Martínez (yellow card) 78'	Report	Torres (yellow card) 2'; Lacerda (yellow card) 43'; Arreola 47', (yellow card) 80'; Jiménez (yellow card) 89'	Referee: César Arturo Ramos

October 8, 2011 Round 12	Atlas	2 – 2	Tijuana	Estadio Jalisco, Guadalajara
20:45	Rodríguez (yellow card) 13' (yellow-red card) 62'; Jiménez 19'; Santos 90+3', (yellow card) 90+4'	Report	Sand 66', (yellow card) 90+4'; Almazán (yellow card) 48'; Gandolfi (yellow card) 50'; Molina 58'; Gerk 81'; Arce (yellow card) 85' (yellow-red card) 88'; Zemeño (yellow card) 90+5'	Referee: Juan Genaro Medrano

October 9, 2011 Round 13	UNAM	1 – 4	Atlas	Estadio Olímpico Universitario, Mexico City
17:00	Palencia 37'; M. Palacios (yellow card) 55'; A. Palacios (yellow card) 56'	Report	Lacerda (yellow card) 16'; Bocanegra 31'; Barraza 48', 57'; Arreola 61'	Referee: Roberto García Orozco

October 22, 2011 Round 14	Atlas	1 – 1	Morelia	Estadio Jalisco, Guadalajara
20:45	Barraza 49', (yellow card) 55'; Pinto (yellow card) 64'	Report	Ramírez (yellow card) 7'; E. Pérez (yellow card) 51'; Márquez (yellow card) 64', (goal) 82'; Noriega (yellow card) 64'; Lozano (yellow card) 67'; Jiménez (yellow card) 77'	Referee: Erim Ramírez

October 26, 2011 Round 15	Monterrey	2 – 0	Atlas	Estadio Tecnológico, Monterrey
20:00	Suazo 60'; Osorio (yellow card) 69'; Santana (yellow card) 82'; Delgado (yellow card) 87'; S. Pérez 90+2'	Report	Santos (yellow card) 40'; Jiménez (yellow card) 65'; Barraza (yellow card) 82'; Lacerda (yellow card) 84'; Télles (yellow card) 89'	Referee: Fernando Guerrero

October 30, 2011 Round 16	Atlas	1 – 1	Guadalajara	Estadio Jalisco, Guadalajara
20:45	Ramos (yellow card) 10' (yellow-red card) 39'; Arreola (yellow card) 44'; Bocanegra (yellow card) 68'; Ayala 78'	Report	Medina (yellow card) 36'; Fierro (yellow card) 53'; Torres 54'	Referee: Jorge Isaac Rojas

November 5, 2011 Round 17	Santos Laguna	3 – 0	Atlas	Estadio Corona, Torreón
19:00	Baloy (yellow card) 24'; Hoyos 27', (red card) 64'; Ludueña (yellow card) 28'; Morales 88'; Peralta 90+3'	Report	Rodríguez (yellow card) 18'; Arreola (yellow card) 27'; Rojas (yellow card) 68'; Pinto (red card) 86'	Referee: Marco Antonio Rodríguez

Atlas did not qualify to the Final Phase

=== Goalscorers ===
Position	Nation	Name	Goals scored
1.	(Mexico)	Jahir Barraza	3
1.	(Mexico)	Maurico Romero	3
1.	(Mexico)	Francisco Torres	3
4.	(Mexico)	Daniel Arreola	2
4.	(Mexico)	Ricardo Bocanegra	2
4.	(Mexico)	Hugo Isaác Rodríguez	2
4.	(Mexico)	Flavio Santos	2
8.	(Argentina)	Lucas Ayala	1
8.	(Mexico)	Ricardo Jiménez	1
8.	(Honduras)	Georgie Welcome	1
TOTAL			20

=== Results ===
==== Results summary ====
Overall								Home						Away					
Pld	W	D	L	GF	GA	GD	Pts	W	D	L	GF	GA	GD	W	D	L	GF	GA	GD
17	2	6	9	20	30	−10	12	1	4	4	10	12	−2	1	2	5	10	18	−8

Last updated: 5 November 2011.
Source: Apertura 2011 results

==== Results by round ====
Round	1	2	3	4	5	6	7	8	9	10	11	12	13	14	15	16	17
Ground	H	A	H	A	H	A	H	H	A	H	A	H	A	H	A	H	A
Result	L	L	W	D	L	L	L	D	L	L	D	D	W	D	L	D	L
Position	14	15	10	8	15	16	18	18	18	18	18	18	18	18	18	18	18

Updated to match(es) played on 6 November 2011. Source: Apertura 2011 results and mediotiempo.com
A = Away; H = Home; W = Win; D = Draw; L = Loss

== Transfers ==
=== In ===
#	Pos	Nat	Player	Age	From	Date	Notes
	FW	(Venezuela)	Giancarlo Maldonado	29	Atlante	December 3, 2011	
	GK	(Mexico)	Jorge Villalpando	26	Toluca	December 3, 2011	
	DF	(Mexico)	Rogelio Chávez	27	Pachuca	December 6, 2011	
	DF	(Argentina)	Leandro Cufré	33	(Croatia) Dinamo Zagreb	December 7, 2011	
	DF	(Argentina)	Facundo Erpen	28	(Argentina) Instituto	December 17, 2011	
	MF	(Argentina)	Jorge Zamogilny	31	Estudiantes Tecos	December 20, 2011	

=== Out ===
#	Pos	Nat	Player	Age	To	Date	Notes
11	FW	(Uruguay)	Gastón Puerari	25	TBD	September 29, 2011	Sacked
5	DF	(Uruguay)	Jonathan Lacerda	24	TBD	December 3, 2011	
24	GK	(Mexico)	José Francisco Canales	24	TBD	December 3, 2011	
17	FW	(Honduras)	Georgie Welcome	26	TBD	December 3, 2011	
2	DF	(Mexico)	Ricardo Jiménez	27	Atlante	December 3, 2011	
3	DF	(Mexico)	Néstor Vidrio	22	Pachuca	December 7, 2011	

== Torneo Clausura ==
=== Squad ===
Note: Flags indicate national team as defined under FIFA eligibility rules; some limited exceptions apply. Players may hold more than one non-FIFA nationality.

No.	Pos.	Nation	Player
1	GK	CHI	Miguel Pinto
5	DF	ARG	Facundo Erpen
6	MF	MEX	Francisco Torres
7	FW	MEX	Flavio Santos
8	MF	MEX	Lucas Ayala
9	FW	VEN	Giancarlo Maldonado
11	FW	MEX	Sergio Santana
12	DF	MEX	Rogelio Chávez
13	GK	MEX	Jorge Villalpando
14	FW	MEX	Mauricio Romero

No.	Pos.	Nation	Player
17	MF	ARG	Damián Zamogilny
18	DF	MEX	Jesús Arturo Paganoni
19	MF	MEX	Saúl Villalobos
20	DF	MEX	Hugo Rodríguez
21	GK	MEX	Alejandro Gallardo
22	MF	MEX	Guillermo Rojas
23	MF	MEX	Ricardo Bocanegra
25	DF	ARG	Leandro Cufré
26	MF	MEX	Carlos Gutiérrez
28	FW	MEX	Jahir Barraza

=== Regular season ===
Win Draw Loss

==== Clausura 2012 results ====
January 8, 2012 Round 1	Puebla	0 – 0	Atlas	Estadio Cuauhtémoc, Puebla
12:00	Pineda 39'; Salinas (yellow card) 90+1'	Report	Villalpando (yellow card) 31'; Santos (yellow card) 34'; Ayala (yellow card) 45+'; Maldonado (yellow card) 45+'; Rodríguez (yellow card) 79'; Barraza (yellow card) 81'	Referee: José Alfredo Peñaloza

January 14, 2012 Round 2	Atlas	0 – 2	Cruz Azul	Estadio Jalisco, Guadalajara
20:45	Zamogliny (yellow card) 1'; Rodríguez (yellow card) 32'; Romero (yellow card) 69'	Report	Bravo (yellow card) 40'; Villa 43'; Corona (yellow card) 76'; Giménez 80'	Referee: Paul Delgadillo

January 21, 2012 Round 3	Querétaro	2 – 1	Atlas	Estadio Corregidora, Querétaro
17:00	Romo 18'; Mondragón (yellow card) 21'; López (yellow card) 22'; Ponce 35'; Vitti (yellow card) 44'; Pérez (yellow card) 61'	Report	Rodríguez (yellow card) 34'; Ayala (yellow card) 40'; Torres (yellow card) 59'; Santos (yellow card) 78'; Zamora (red card) 80'; Maldonado 90'	Referee: Miguel Ángel Ortega

January 28, 2012 Round 4	Atlas	1 – 0	Toluca	Estadio Jalisco, Guadalajara
20:45	Rodríguez (yellow card) 14'; Maldonado (yellow card) 14', (goal) 48'	Report	Calderón (yellow card) 8'; Porras (yellow card) 32'; Dueñas (yellow card) 41' (yellow-red card) 77'; Alonso (yellow card) 61'	Referee: Miguel Ángel Chacón

February 3, 2012 Round 5	Estudiantes Tecos	0 – 0	Atlas	Estadio Tres de Marzo, Zapopan
20:10	Leaño (yellow card) 3'; Sambueza (yellow card) 54'; J.A. Castro (yellow card) 15'	Report	Santos (yellow card) 35'; Erpen (yellow card) 41'	Referee: Ricardo Arellano

February 11, 2012 Round 6	Atlas	1 – 1	América	Estadio Jalisco, Guadalajara
20:45	Erpen (yellow card) 29'; Rodríguez 34', (yellow card) 59'; Maldonado (yellow card) 41'; Barraza (yellow card) 80'	Report	Aguilar 39'; Mosquera (yellow card) 41'; Cárdenas (yellow card) 61'; Viscarrondo (yellow card) 90+2'	Referee: Jorge Isaac Rojas

February 18, 2012 Round 7	UANL	0 – 0	Atlas	Estadio Universitario, San Nicolás
19:00	Álvarez (red card) 26'	Report	Gutiérrez (yellow card) 7'; Santos (yellow card) 90'	Referee: Francisco Chacón

February 25, 2012 Round 8	San Luis	0 – 1	Atlas	Estadio Alfonso Lastras, San Luis Potosí
20:45	Paredes (yellow card) 20'; Arredondo (red card) 27'; Aguirre (yellow card) 56'; Velasco (yellow card) 68' (yellow-red card) 69'; Villaluz (yellow card) 88'	Report	Santos 47'; Gutiérrez (yellow card) 52'; Paganoni (yellow card) 65'; Romero (yellow card) 80'	Referee: Roberto García Orozco

March 3, 2012 Round 9	Atlas	0 – 0	Pachuca	Estadio Jalisco, Guadalajara
20:45	Ayala (yellow card) 76'; Chávez (yellow card) 80'	Report	Arreola (yellow card) 59'; Muñoz Mustafá (yellow card) 69'	Referee: Miguel Ángel Ayala

March 10, 2012 Round 10	Atlante	0 – 0	Atlas	Estadio Andrés Quintana Roo, Cancún
21:00	Rojas (yellow card) 7'; Muñoz (yellow card) 39'; Venegas (yellow card) 49'; Navarrete (yellow card) 90+1'; Arroyo (yellow card) 90+2'	Report	Rodríguez (yellow card) 14'; Gutiérrez (yellow card) 60'; Romero (yellow card) 86'; Maldonado (yellow card) 87'	Referee: Fabricio Morales

March 17, 2012 Round 11	Atlas	0 – 3	Chiapas	Estadio Jalisco, Guadalajara
20:45	Ayala (yellow card) 33'; Cufré (yellow card) 37'; Erpen (red card) 63'; Santos (red card) 89'	Report	Andrade (yellow card) 21'; J. Martínez (yellow card) 22', (goal) 73', 84'; Rey 41'; Noriega (yellow card) 45+'	Referee: Antony Zanjuampa

March 24, 2012 Round 12	Tijuana	2 – 0	Atlas	Estadio Caliente, Tijuana
19:00	Sand 19'; Arévalo Ríos (yellow card) 35'; Abrego (yellow card) 59' (yellow-red card); Enríquez 69'; Castillo (yellow card) 90+4'	Report	Cufré (red card) 57'; Torres (yellow card) 45+'; Pinto (yellow card) 67'	Referee: Marco Antonio Rodríguez

March 31, 2012 Round 13	Atlas	0 – 0	UNAM	Estadio Jalisco, Guadalajara
20:45	Ayala (yellow card) 17'	Report	M. Palacios (yellow card) 39'; Gámez (yellow card) 49'; Herrera (yellow card) 90+1'	Referee: Ricardo Arellano

April 6, 2012 Round 14	Morelia	0 – 0	Atlas	Estadio Morelos, Morelia
20:10	Huiqui (yellow card) 16'	Report	Chávez (yellow card) 46'	Referee: Jorge Isaac Rojas

April 14, 2012 Round 15	Atlas	1 – 0	Monterrey	Estadio Jalisco, Guadalajara
20:45	Rodríguez 37'; Santos (yellow card) 41'	Report	Arce (yellow card) 8'; Meza (yellow card) 31'	Referee: Roberto García Orozco

April 21, 2012 Round 16	Guadalajara	0 – 1	Atlas	Estadio Omnilife, Zapopan
19:00	Álvarez (yellow card) 17' (yellow-red card) 90' de Luna (yellow card) 48'; Arrellano (yellow card) 61'	Report	Ayala (yellow card) 17' (red card) 90+3'; Santos (yellow card) 39', (goal) 48'; Barraza (yellow card) 51'; Cufré (yellow card) 63'; Paganoni (yellow card) 65'	Referee: Mauricio Morales

April 28, 2012 Round 17	Atlas	1 – 3	Santos Laguna	Estadio Jalisco, Guadalajara
20:45	Cufré (yellow card) 15', (goal) 20' (pen.); Chávez (yellow card) 47'	Report	Peralta 2', 49'; Quintero 5'; Hoyos (yellow card) 12'	Referee: Francisco Chacón

atlas did not qualify to the Final Phase

=== Goalscorers ===
Position	Nation	Name	Goals scored
1.	(Venezuela)	Giancarlo Maldonado	2
1.	(Mexico)	Hugo Isaác Rodríguez	2
1.	(Mexico)	Flavio Santos	2
4.	(Argentina)	Leandro Cufré	1
TOTAL			7

=== Results ===
==== Results summary ====
Overall								Home						Away					
Pld	W	D	L	GF	GA	GD	Pts	W	D	L	GF	GA	GD	W	D	L	GF	GA	GD
17	4	8	5	7	12	−5	20	3	3	3	5	8	−3	1	5	2	2	4	−2

Last updated: 28 April 2012.
Source: Clausura 2012 results

==== Results by round ====
Round	1	2	3	4	5	6	7	8	9	10	11	12	13	14	15	16	17
Ground	A	H	A	H	A	H	A	A	H	A	H	A	H	A	H	A	H
Result	D	L	L	W	D	D	D	W	D	D	L	L	D	D	W	W	L
Position	13	14	16	15	14	13	12	10	10	10	11	13	13	14	11	10	11

Updated to match(es) played on 29 April 2012. Source: Clausura 2012 results and mediotiempo.com
A = Away; H = Home; W = Win; D = Draw; L = Loss
