= 2013–14 Club Atlas season =

Atlas
2013–14 season
- Chairman: Gustavo Guzmán Sepúlveda (December 2013-present)
- Manager: Omar Asad (19 July 2013-20 October 2013); Jose Luis Mata (21 October-11 November 2013); Tomás Boy (04 January 2014-present)
- Stadium: Estadio Jalisco
- Apertura 2013: 15th
- Clausura 2014: 12th
- Copa MX (Apertura): Runner-up
- Copa MX (Clausura): Group stage
- Top goalscorer: Apertura: Omar Bravo (6); Clausura: Rodrigo Millar (5)
Home colours	Away colours	Third colours

The 2013–14 Atlas season was the 67th professional season of Mexico's top-flight football league. The season is split into two tournaments—the Torneo Apertura and the Torneo Clausura—each with identical formats and each contested by the same eighteen teams.

Atlas began their season on July 19, 2013 against Club Tijuana. Atlas played their homes games on Saturdays at 9:00pm local time. Atlas did not qualify to the final phase in the Apertura and Clausura tournaments.

== Tornero Apertura ==
=== Squad ===
Note: Flags indicate national team as defined under FIFA eligibility rules; some limited exceptions apply. Players may hold more than one non-FIFA nationality.

No.	Pos.	Nation	Player
1	GK	CHI	Miguel Pinto
2	DF	MEX	Giovanni León
3	DF	MEX	Luis Ramos
4	DF	MEX	Antonio Briseño
5	DF	ARG	Facundo Erpen
6	MF	MEX	Luis Télles
7	DF	MEX	Óscar Razo
8	MF	MEX	Lucas Ayala
10	MF	BOL	José Chávez
11	MF	MEX	Édson Rivera
12	GK	MEX	Arturo Borrego
13	DF	MEX	Gregorio Torres
14	DF	MEX	Alexis Loera
15	MF	MEX	Arturo González
16	DF	MEX	Sergio Ponce
17	FW	MEX	Jahir Barraza

No.	Pos.	Nation	Player
18	MF	MEX	Arturo Paganoni
19	MF	MEX	Saúl Villalobos
20	MF	CHI	Rodrigo Millar
21	GK	MEX	Alan López
22	MF	MEX	Juan Vigón
23	MF	MEX	Ricardo Bocanegra
24	MF	MEX	Mario Rodríguez
25	DF	ARG	Leandro Cufré (captain)
26	FW	MEX	Flavio Santos
27	FW	MEX	Christian Díaz
28	FW	MEX	Martín Barragán
29	DF	MEX	Guillermo Martín
30	FW	MEX	Matías Vuoso
31	DF	MEX	Gilberto Jiménez
34	MF	MEX	Julio Betancio
35	GK	MEX	Elías Lomelí

=== Regular season ===
Win Draw Loss

==== Apertura 2013 results ====
19 July 2013 round 1	Tijuana	3 – 3	Atlas	Tijuana, Baja California
	Darío Benedetto 6', 17', 64'		Matías Vuoso 29' (pen.), 69'; Edson Rivera 83'	Stadium: Caliente Stadium

27 July 2013 round 2	Atlas	1 – 2	León	Guadalajara, Jalisco
	Flavio Santos 4'		Mauro Boselli 35'; Carlos Peña 48'	Stadium: Jalisco Stadium

30 July 2013 round 3	Atlante F.C.	1 – 1	Atlas	Cancun, Quintana Roo
	Ángel Sepúlveda 86'		Omar Bravo 30'	Stadium: Andrés Quintana Roo Stadium

3 August 2013 round 4	America	3 – 0	Atlas	Mexico City
	Narciso Mina 25'; Raúl Jiménez 69'; Rubens Sambueza 76'			Stadium: Estadio Azteca

10 August 2013 round 5	Atlas	1 – 1	Pachuca	Pachuca, Hidalgo
	Fernando Cavenaghi 61'		Matías Vuoso 90+3'	Stadium: Hidalgo Stadium

16 August 2013 round 6	Morelia	2 – 0	Atlas	Morelia, Michoacan
	Rodrigo Salinas 70'; Aldo Leao Ramírez 81'			Stadium: Morelos Stadium

24 August 2013 round 7	Atlas	1 – 1	UNAM	Guadalajara, Jalisco
	Omar Bravo 52'		Ariel Nahuelpan 36'	Stadium: Jalisco Stadium

31 August 2013 round 8	Rayados	0 – 0	Atlas	Monterrey, Nuevo Leon
				Stadium: Estadio Tecnologico

7 September 2013 round 9	Atlas	2 – 2	Santos	Guadalajara, Jalisco
	Omar Bravo 8', 80' (pen.)		Javier Orozco 74'; Rafael Figueroa 84'	Stadium: Jalisco Stadium

14 September 2013 round 10	Jaguares	3 – 0	Atlas	Tuxtla Gutierrez, Chiapas
	David Mendieta 5'; David Toledo 11'; Luis Alfonso Rodríguez 30'			Stadium: Victor Manuel Reyna Stadium

21 September 2013 round 11	Atlas	3 – 3	Veracruz	Guadalajara, Jalisco
	Omar Bravo 26' (pen.); Matías Vuoso 76'; Edson Rivera 90+4'		Ángel Reyna 28' (pen.); Cristian Martínez 47'; Jesús Armando Sánchez 52'	Stadium: Jalisco Stadium

29 September 2013 round 12	Guadalajara	1 – 1	Atlas	Zapopan, Jalisco
	Marco Fabian 85'		Facundo Erpen 19'	Stadium: Omnilife Stadium

5 October 2013 round 13	Atlas	1 – 2	Cruz Azul	Guadalajara, Jalisco
	Arturo González 10'		Mariano Pavone 44'; Joao Rojas 47'	Stadium: Jalisco Stadium

20 October 2013 round 14	Puebla	2 – 0	Atlas	Puebla City, Puebla
	Carlos Andrés Sánchez 17'; Luis Miguel Noriega 50'			Stadium: Cuauhtemoc Stadium

26 October 2013 round 15	Atlas	3 – 1	Queretaro	Guadalajara, Jalisco
	Edson Rivera 17'; Flavio Santos 60'; Matías Vuoso 81'		Leandro Gracián 73'	Stadium: Jalisco Stadium

3 November 2013 round 16	Toluca	1 – 1	Atlas	Toluca, State of Mexico
	Pablo Velázquez 76' (pen.)		Omar Bravo 66'	Stadium: Estadio Nemesio Díez

9 November 2013 round 17	Atlas	0 – 1	UANL	Guadalajara, Jalisco
			Facundo Erpen 51' (o.g.)	Stadium: Jalisco Stadium

=== Goalscorers ===
Position	Nation	Name	Goals scored
1.	(Mexico)	Omar Bravo	6
2.	(Mexico) (Argentina)	Matías Vuoso	5
3.	(Mexico)	Edson Rivera	3
4.	(Mexico)	Flavio Santos	2
5.	(Mexico)	Arturo González	1
6.	(Argentina)	Facundo Erpen	1
TOTAL			18

=== Results ===
==== Results summary ====
Overall								Home						Away					
Pld	W	D	L	GF	GA	GD	Pts	W	D	L	GF	GA	GD	W	D	L	GF	GA	GD
17	1	9	7	18	29	−11	12	1	4	3	12	13	−1	0	5	4	6	16	−10

Last updated: 09 November 2013.
Source: Apertura 2013 results

=== Group stage ===
Win Draw Loss

==== Apertura results ====
23 July 2013 1	Atlas	1 – 1	Estudiantes	Guadalajara, Jalisco
	Jahir Barraza 65'		Lugiani Gallardo 19'	Stadium: Jalisco Stadium

6 August 2013 2	Estudiantes	2 – 3	Atlas	Zapopan, Jalisco
	Fernando Leonel Cortes 59'; Elgabry Rangel 61'		Carlos Nava 5'; Martin Barragan 49'; Daniel Cisneros 68'	Stadium: Estadio Tres de Marzo

21 August 2013 3	Atlas	3 – 1	Celaya	Guadalajara, Jalisco
	Jahir Barraza 5'; Edson Rivera 26'; Luis Ramos 80'		Leandro Carrijó 52'	Stadium: Jalisco Stadium

28 August 2013 4	Celaya	1 – 1	Atlas	Celaya, Guanajuato
	Luis Trillo 33'		Jahir Barraza 79'	Stadium: Estadio Miguel Alemán

17 September 2013 5	Atlas	1 – 1	Morelia	Guadalajara, Jalisco
	Jahir Barraza 11'		Carlos Adrián Morales 63' (pen.)	Stadium: Jalisco Stadium

24 September 2013 6	Morelia	0 – 1	Atlas	Morelia, Michoacan
			Juan Carlos Arellano 71' (o.g.)	Stadium: Estadio Morelos

=== Quarter-finals ===
2 October 2013 Quarter-Finals	Atlas	2 – 1	UNAM	Guadalajara, Jalisco
	Jahir Barraza 11', 87'		Ariel Nahuelpan 90+3'	Stadium: Jalisco Stadium

=== Semi-finals ===
23 October 2013 Semi-Finals	Oaxaca	1 – 1 (4−5 p)	Atlas	Oaxaca, Oaxaca
	Gustavo Adrián Ramírez 34'		Flavio Santos 47'	Stadium: Estadio Benito Juárez
	Penalties
	Torres (penalty scored); Madrigal (penalty scored); Ramírez (penalty scored); Medina (penalty missed); Alfaro (penalty scored)		(penalty scored) Bravo; (penalty scored) Torres; (penalty scored) Barraza; (penalty scored) Ponce; (penalty scored) Ayala

=== Final ===
5 November 2013 Final	Morelia	3 – 3 (3−1 p)	Atlas	Morelia, Michoacan
	Jefferson Montero 6'; Edgar Andrade 12'; Héctor Mancilla 53'		Omar Bravo 39' (pen.); Matías Vuoso 51'; Lucas Ayala 57'	Stadium: Estadio Morelos
	Penalties
	Mancilla (penalty scored); Vilar (penalty scored); Zamorano (penalty scored)		(penalty missed) Vuoso; (penalty scored) Santos; (penalty missed) Cufré; (penalty missed) Ayala

=== Goalscorers ===
Position	Nation	Name	Goals scored
1.	(Mexico)	Jahir Barraza	6
2.	(Mexico)	Carlos Nava	1
3.	(Mexico)	Martin Barragan	1
4.	(Mexico)	Daniel Cisneros	1
5.	(Mexico)	Edson Rivera	1
6.	(Mexico)	Luis Ramos	1
7.	(Mexico)	Flavio Santos	1
8.	(Mexico)	Flavio Santos	1
9.	(Mexico)	Omar Bravo	1
10.	(Mexico) (Argentina)	Matias Vuoso	1
11.	(Mexico) (Argentina)	Lucas Ayala	1
TOTAL			16

== Tornero Clausura ==
=== First-team squad ===
As of 9 November 2013.

Note: Flags indicate national team as defined under FIFA eligibility rules; some limited exceptions apply. Players may hold more than one non-FIFA nationality.

No.	Pos.	Nation	Player
1	GK	ARG	Federico Vilar
2	DF	MEX	Giovanni León
4	DF	MEX	Antonio Briseño
5	DF	ARG	Facundo Erpen
6	DF	MEX	Enrique Pérez (on loan from Morelia)
7	DF	MEX	Óscar Razo
9	FW	PAR	José Ortigoza
10	FW	BRA	Maikon Leite
11	FW	MEX	Édson Rivera
11	DF	MEX	Gregorio Torres
15	MF	MEX	Arturo González
16	DF	MEX	Sergio Amaury Ponce
17	FW	MEX	Jahir Barraza
20	MF	CHI	Rodrigo Millar

No.	Pos.	Nation	Player
21	GK	MEX	Alan López
22	MF	MEX	Juan Pablo Vigón
23	MF	MEX	Ricardo Bocanegra
24	MF	MEX	Mario Rodríguez
25	DF	ARG	Leandro Cufré (captain)
26	FW	MEX	Flavio Santos
28	FW	MEX	Martín Barragán
30	FW	MEX	Vicente Matías Vuoso
31	DF	MEX	Gilberto Jiménez
33	GK	MEX	Higinio Bucio
35	GK	MEX	Elías Lomelí
36	MF	MEX	Carlos Treviño

=== Regular season ===
Win Draw Loss

==== Clausura 2014 results ====
4 January 2014 round 1	Atlas	0 – 0	Tijuana	Guadalajara, Jalisco
				Stadium: Jalisco Stadium

11 January 2014 round 2	León	3 – 1	Atlas	León, Guanajuato
	Carlos Peña 2', 38'; Luis Montes 76'		Maikon Leite 78'	Stadium: Estadio León

18 January 2014 round 3	Atlas	0 – 1	Atlante F.C.	Guadalajara, Jalisco
			Narciso Mina 62'	Stadium: Jalisco Stadium

25 January 2014 round 4	Atlas	1 – 2	America	Guadalajara, Jalisco
	Rodrigo Millar 41'		Luis Gabriel Rey 56', 80'	Stadium: Jalisco Stadium

1 February 2014 round 5	Pachuca	0 – 1	Atlas	Pachuca, Hidalgo
			Rodrigo Millar 54'	Stadium: Hidalgo Stadium

8 February 2014 round 6	Atlas	1 – 1	Morelia	Guadalajara, Jalisco
	Arturo González 53'		Egidio Arévalo 2'	Stadium: Jalisco Stadium

16 February 2014 round 7	UNAM	1 – 1	Atlas	Mexico City
	Ismael Sosa 75'		Arturo González 20'	Stadium: Estadio Olimpico Universitario

22 February 2014 round 8	Atlas	0 – 1	Rayados	Guadalajara, Jalisco
			Lucas Silva 20'	Stadium: Jalisco Stadium

28 February 2014 round 9	Santos	2 – 3	Atlas	Torreon, Coahuila
	Carlos Darwin Quintero 16'; José Abella 88'		Rodrigo Millar 27', 85'; Maikon Leite 32'	Stadium: Nuevo Estadio Corona

8 March 2014 round 10	Atlas	2 – 2	Jaguares	Guadalajara, Jalisco
	Arturo González 6'; José Ortigoza 49'		Carlos Ochoa 60' (pen.), 68'	Stadium: Jalisco Stadium

15 March 2014 round 11	Veracruz	0 – 1	Atlas	Veracruz, Veracruz
			Maikon Leite 22'	Stadium: Estadio Luis "Pirata" Fuente

22 March 2014 round 12	Atlas	1 – 1	Guadalajara	Guadalajara, Jalisco
	José Ortigoza 72'		Aldo de Nigris 8'	Stadium: Jalisco Stadium

29 March 2014 round 13	Cruz Azul	1 – 3	Atlas	Mexico City
	Marco Fabian 13'		Martín Barragán 2', 43'; Maikon Leite 31'	Stadium: Estadio Azul

5 April 2014 round 14	Atlas	0 – 0	Puebla	Zapopan, Jalisco
				Stadium: Estadio Tres de Marzo

11 April 2014 round 15	Queretaro	1 – 0	Atlas	Queretaro, Queretaro
	Camilo Da Silva 69'			Stadium: La Corregidora Stadium

19 April 2014 round 16	Atlas	1 – 0	Toluca	Guadalajara, Jalisco
	Rodrigo Millar 70'			Stadium: Jalisco Stadium

26 April 2014 round 17	UANL	2 – 1	Atlas	Monterrey, Nuevo Leon
	Hugo Ayala 36'; Alán Pulido 75'		Jahir Barraza 72'	Stadium: Estadio Universitario

=== Goalscorers ===
Position	Nation	Name	Goals scored
1.	(Chile)	Rodrigo Millar	5
2.	(Brazil)	Maikon Leite	4
3.	(Mexico)	Arturo González	3
4.	(Paraguay)	José Ortigoza	2
5.	(Mexico)	Martín Barragán	2
6.	(Mexico)	Jahir Barraza	1
TOTAL			17

=== Results ===
==== Results summary ====
Overall								Home						Away					
Pld	W	D	L	GF	GA	GD	Pts	W	D	L	GF	GA	GD	W	D	L	GF	GA	GD
17	5	6	6	17	18	−1	21	1	5	3	6	8	−2	4	1	3	11	10	+1

Last updated: 27 April 2014.
Source: Clausura 2014 results

=== Group stage ===
Win Draw Loss

==== Clausura results ====
14 January 2014 1	Atlas	1 – 1	Necaxa	Guadalajara, Jalisco
	Martín Barragán 27'		Jesús Isijara 7' (pen.)	Stadium: Jalisco Stadium

22 January 2014 2	Necaxa	1 – 0	Atlas	Aguascalientes, Aguascalientes
	Jesús Isijara 77'			Stadium: Estadio Victoria

4 February 2014 3	Celaya	2 – 2	Atlas	Celaya, Guanajuato
	Luis Efrén Hernández 6'; José Alfredo González 81'		Jahir Barraza 56'; Alejandro Leyva 90+2'	Stadium: Estadio Miguel Alemán

18 February 2014 4	Atlas	0 – 1	Celaya	Guadalajara, Jalisco
			Roberto Carlos Alvarado 27'	Stadium: Jalisco Stadium

25 February 2014 5	Atlas	3 – 2	Querétaro	Guadalajara, Jalisco
	Flavio Santos 24'; Jahir Barraza 52', 90+3'		Dionicio Escalante 37'; Rodolfo Vilchis 55'	Stadium: Jalisco Stadium

11 March 2014 6	Querétaro	1 – 0	Atlas	Querétaro, Querétaro
	Isaac Romo 40'			Stadium: Estadio Corregidora

=== Goalscorers ===
Position	Nation	Name	Goals scored
1.	(Mexico)	Jahir Barraza	3
2.	(Mexico)	Martín Barragán	1
3.	(Mexico)	Alejandro Leyva	1
4.	(Mexico)	Flavio Santos	1
TOTAL			6
