= List of Portuguese football transfers winter 2009–10 =

This is a list of Portuguese winter football transfers for the 2009–10 season. The winter transfer window opened on 1 January 2010 and closed on 31 January 2010. Players could be bought before the transfer window opened, but were not permitted to join their new clubs until 1 January. Additionally, players without a club could join at any time and clubs were able to sign a goalkeeper on an emergency loan if they had no registered goalkeeper available. Only moves involving Primeira Liga clubs are listed; included are clubs that completed transfers after the end of the summer 2009 transfer window and before the end of the 2009–10 winter window.

== Transfers ==
Date	Name	Moving from	Moving to	Fee
10 December 2009	(Brazil) Cristiano	(Portugal) Paços de Ferreira	(Greece) PAOK	Undisclosed
12 December 2009	(Portugal) Miguel Pedro	(Portugal) Académica de Coimbra	(Cyprus) Anorthosis Famagusta	Free
16 December 2009	(Mozambique) Mexer	(Mozambique) Desportivo de Maputo	(Portugal) Sporting CP	€166,000
22 December 2009	(Estonia) Vjatšeslav Zahovaiko	(Estonia) Flora Tallinn	(Portugal) União de Leiria	Free
22 December 2009	(Portugal) João Pereira	(Portugal) Braga	(Portugal) Sporting CP	€3,000,000
22 December 2009	(Brazil) Alan Kardec	(Brazil) Vasco Da Gama	(Portugal) Benfica	€2,300,000
23 December 2009	(Brazil) Airton	(Brazil) Flamengo	(Portugal) Benfica	€2,500,000
28 December 2009	(France) Florent Sinama Pongolle	(Spain) Atlético Madrid	(Portugal) Sporting CP	€6,500,000
29 December 2009	(Brazil) Éder Luís	(Brazil) Atlético Mineiro	(Portugal) Benfica	€2,000,000
1 January 2010	(Argentina) Nelson Benítez	(Portugal) Porto	(Argentina) San Lorenzo	Loan
4 January 2010	(Portugal) Neca	(Turkey) Ankaraspor	(Portugal) Vitória de Setúbal	Free
4 January 2010	(Brazil) Ney Santos	(Portugal) Braga	(Portugal) Vitória de Setúbal	Loan
4 January 2010	(Portugal) Ricardo Silva	(Russia) Shinnik	(Portugal) Vitória de Setúbal	Free
5 January 2010	(Romania) László Sepsi	(Portugal) Benfica	(Romania) Politehnica Timișoara	€1,200,000
5 January 2010	(Brazil) Hammes	(Portugal) União de Leiria	(Portugal) Sporting Covilhã	Loan
6 January 2010	(United States) Freddy Adu	(Portugal) Benfica	(Greece) Aris	Loan
7 January 2010	(Serbia) Vladimir Stojković	(Portugal) Sporting CP	(England) Wigan Athletic	Loan
8 January 2010	(Uruguay) Jonathan Urretaviscaya	(Portugal) Benfica	(Uruguay) Peñarol	Loan
9 January 2010	(Portugal) Edu	(Portugal) Braga	(Portugal) Vizela	Loan
9 January 2010	(Portugal) Wilson Eduardo	(Portugal) Sporting CP	(Portugal) Portimonense	Loan
9 January 2010	(Brazil) Edcarlos	(Portugal) Benfica	(Mexico) Cruz Azul	€1,300,000
10 January 2010	(United States) Gale Agbossoumonde	(United States) Fort Lauderdale Strikers	(Portugal) Braga	Loan
10 January 2010	(Portugal) Pizzi	(Portugal) Braga	(Portugal) Paços de Ferreira	Loan
12 January 2010	(Portugal) Jorge Monteiro	(Portugal) Porto	(Portugal) Sporting da Covilhã	Loan
12 January 2010	(Colombia) Wason Rentería	(Portugal) Porto	(Portugal) Braga	Loan
13 January 2010	(Venezuela) Mario Rondón	(Portugal) Paços de Ferreira	(Portugal) Beira-Mar	Loan
15 January 2010	(Portugal) Yazalde	(Portugal) Braga	(Portugal) Rio Ave	Loan
16 January 2010	(Uruguay) Luis Aguiar	(Russia) Dynamo Moscow	(Portugal) Braga	Loan
20 January 2010	(Portugal) Filipe da Costa	(Portugal) Nacional	(Portugal) Estoril	Loan
21 January 2010	(Brazil) Bruno Moraes	(Portugal) Porto	(Portugal) Rio Ave	Loan
21 January 2010	(Paraguay) David Mendieta	(Portugal) Vitória de Guimarães	(Portugal) Gondomar	Loan
25 January 2010	(Portugal) Miguelito	(Portugal) Marítimo	(Portugal) Belenenses	Loan
25 January 2010	(Mali) Mourtala Diakité	(Portugal) Belenenses	(Portugal) Marítimo	Free
27 January 2010	(Argentina) Sebastián Prediger	(Portugal) Porto	(Argentina) Boca Juniors	Loan
27 January 2010	(Brazil) Alan	(Portugal) Vitória de Setúbal	(Portugal) Carregado	Free
28 January 2010	(Argentina) José Shaffer	(Portugal) Benfica	(Argentina) Banfield	Loan
28 January 2010	(Equatorial Guinea) Javier Balboa	(Portugal) Benfica	(Spain) Cartagena	Loan
29 January 2010	(Portugal) Pedro Mendes	(Scotland) Rangers	(Portugal) Sporting CP	€1,300,000
1 February 2010	(Romania) Cristian Săpunaru	(Portugal) Porto	(Romania) Rapid București	Loan
1 February 2010	(Algeria) Abdelmalek Cherrad	(France) Bastia	(Portugal) Marítimo	Free
1 February 2010	(United States) Kamani Hill	(Portugal) Vitória de Guimarães	(Portugal) Desportivo das Aves	Loan
1 February 2010	(Angola) Stélvio	(Portugal) Braga	(Angola) 1º Agosto	Loan
1 February 2010	(Zambia) Rainford Kalaba	(Portugal) Braga	(Egypt) Zamalek	Loan
1 February 2010	(Portugal) Henrique Sereno	(Portugal) Vitória de Guimarães	(Spain) Real Valladolid	Loan
1 February 2010	(Bulgaria) Krum Bibishkov	(Romania) Steaua București	(Portugal) Académica de Coimbra	Free
2 February 2010	(Ghana) David Addy	(Denmark) Randers	(Portugal) Porto	Undisclosed
10 February 2010	(Brazil) Fellipe Bastos	(Portugal) Benfica	(Switzerland) Servette	Loan

- ^1 Some players may have been bought after the end of the 2009 summer transfer window in Portugal but before the end of that country's transfer window closed.
