= Manuel Correia =

Manuel Correia or Correa may refer to:

- Manuel Correia (composer) (1600–1653), Portuguese Baroque composer
- Manuel Correa Bravo (1857–1932), Chilean politician
- Manuel Pio Correia (1874–1934), Portuguese botanist
- Manuel Correia (footballer) (born 1962), Portuguese football manager and former centre-back
- Manuel António Correia, Portuguese lawyer and politician
- Manuel Correa (footballer) (born 1993), Mexican football midfielder
