= Nungaray =

Nungaray is a surname. Notable people with the surname include:

- Ernest Nungaray (born 1992), American soccer player
- Jocelyn Nungaray, American child murdered in 2024
