= Erick Palafox =

Mexican footballer (born 1982)

Erick Rogelio Palafox Hernández (born 20 June 1982) is a Mexican former professional footballer who played as a midfielder. He spent his entire career in the second-tier Ascenso MX, making appearances for Huracanes de Colima, Coyotes de Sonora, Lagartos de Tabasco, Real Colima, Guerreros de Hermosillo, Altamira and Cafetaleros de Tapachula.
