= Carlos Nava =

Mexican footballer (born 1994)

Personal information
- Full name: Carlos Iván Nava Ramírez
- Date of birth: 14 July 1994 (age 32)
- Place of birth: Guadalajara, Jalisco, Mexico
- Height: 1.68 m (5 ft 6 in)
- Position: Midfielder

Team information
- Current team: Gavilanes de Matamoros
- Number: 7

Youth career
- 2009–2011: Zapotlanejo

Senior career*
Years	Team	Apps	(Gls)
2012–2018	Atlas	15	(0)
2014–2015	→ Altamira (loan)	27	(1)
2015–2016	→ Tampico Madero (loan)	36	(3)
2016–2017	→ Alebrijes de Oaxaca (loan)	28	(1)
2018–2019	Tuxtla	30	(3)
2019–2020	Yalmakán	18	(3)
2020–	Gavilanes de Matamoros	34	(1)
- * Club domestic league appearances and goals as of 15 March 2021

Carlos Iván Nava Ramírez (born July 14, 1994) is a Mexican professional footballer who plays for Gavilanes de Matamoros.
