= David Mendieta =

Paraguayan footballer (born 1988)

Personal information
- Full name: Ramón Eduardo David Mendieta Alfonso
- Date of birth: 4 May 1988 (age 38)
- Place of birth: Ypacaraí, Paraguay
- Height: 1.84 m (6 ft 0 in)
- Position: Midfielder

Team information
- Current team: 12 de Octubre
- Number: 16

Senior career*
Years	Team	Apps	(Gls)
2004–2008	Guaraní	50	(3)
2009	12 de Octubre	9	(1)
2009–2010	Vitória Guimarães	0	(0)
2010	→ Gondomar (loan)	5	(0)
2011	Guaraní	0	(0)
2012	Sol de América	46	(8)
2013–2015	Chiapas	28	(1)
2014	→ Lobos BUAP (loan)	6	(0)
2015	→ Cerro Porteño (loan)	11	(0)
2016	Atlante	21	(3)
2017	Sol de América	32	(0)
2018	Independiente FBC	31	(1)
2019	Sportivo Luqueño	20	(1)
2020	Guaireña	7	(0)
2021–	12 de Octubre	4	(0)

International career
2013	Paraguay	1	(0)
- * Club domestic league appearances and goals as of 19:22, 15 March 2021 (UTC)

Ramón Eduardo David Mendieta Alfonso (born 4 May 1988) is a Paraguayan footballer. He currently plays as a midfielder for 12 de Octubre.

== Career ==
=== Club career ===
Mendieta started his career in his homeland of Paraguay in which he played for Club Guaraní and Club 12 de Octubre. In June 2009, he signed for Portuguese club Vitória Guimarães for €150,000 in which the transfer will go through on 1 July 2009. In January 2010, he was loaned out until the end of the season to Portuguese Second Division side Gondomar.
