= Édson Rivera =

Mexican footballer (born 1991)

Edson Rivera
Personal information
- Full name: Edson Ulises Rivera Vargas
- Date of birth: 4 November 1991 (age 35)
- Place of birth: Guadalajara, Jalisco, Mexico
- Height: 1.80 m (5 ft 11 in)
- Position: Midfielder

Youth career
- 2004–2011: Atlas

Senior career*
Years	Team	Apps	(Gls)
2011–2013	Braga	1	(0)
2013–2020	Atlas	70	(7)
2015	→ Santos Laguna (loan)	15	(0)
2017–2019	→ Sinaloa (loan)	62	(8)
2020–2023	Tepatitlán	64	(5)
2023–2026	UdeG	64	(25)

International career
2011	Mexico U20	12	(4)
Medal record
Winner	CONCACAF U-20 Championship	2011
Third place	FIFA U-20 World Cup	2011
- * Club domestic league appearances and goals

Edson Ulises Rivera Vargas (born 4 November 1991) is a Mexican professional footballer who plays as a midfielder.

== Early life ==
Edson began playing football at age 6. He has been playing for the youth systems of Atlas for seven years.

== Club career ==
=== Atlas ===
Rivera began playing with Atlas' lower division team in Tepic, Nayarit in the 2004–05 season. He has played for their youth system for about 7 seasons and has yet to debut with their First Division. He had a stint with Atlas' other team Académicos de Guadalajara in the 2008–09 season.

=== Braga ===
After his participation in Mexico's U20 World Cup campaign where they would finish third place, and where he finished as their top scorer with three goals, Rivera signed a five-year contract with Braga of the Portuguese Primeira Liga for an undisclosed fee.

Rivera was handed a start by Braga boss Leonardo Jardim in a 2–1 win at Beira-Mar in a league match.

=== Return to Atlas ===
On November 16, 2012, Rivera was presented as the first signing of Atlas for the Clausura 2013 tournament. He scored his first goal of the season on February 9, 2013, against Atlante, in which he dedicated it to his mother, who died that same week.

== International career ==
Rivera has been involved with the Mexico under-20 national team. He competed in tournaments such as the 2011 Toulon Tournament in France. He was also Mexico's top scorer in the 2011 FIFA U-20 World Cup.

== Honours ==
Santos Laguna

- Liga MX: Clausura 2015
- Campeón de Campeones: 2015

Tepatitlán

- Liga de Expansión MX: Guardianes 2021
- Campeón de Campeones: 2021

Mexico U20

- CONCACAF Under-20 Championship: 2011

Individual

- Liga de Expansión MX Best Player: 2023–24
