= Carlos Gutiérrez (footballer, born 1990) =

Mexican footballer (born 1990)

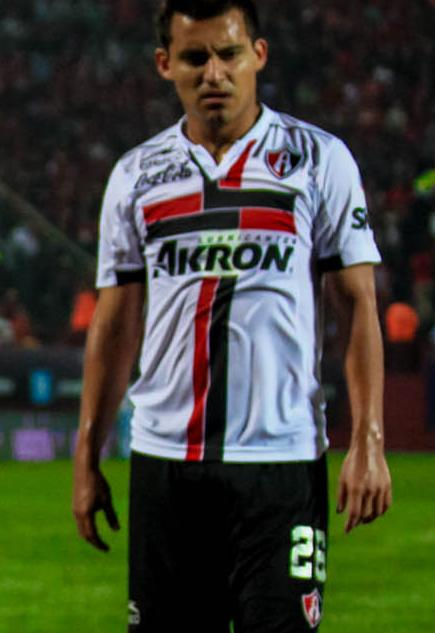
- Gutiérrez playing for Atlas

Personal information
- Full name: Carlos Alberto Gutiérrez Armas
- Date of birth: 3 February 1990 (age 36)
- Place of birth: Guadalajara, Mexico
- Height: 1.69 m (5 ft 6 1/2 in)
- Position: Defensive midfielder

Senior career*
Years	Team	Apps	(Gls)
2009–2013	Atlas	38	(0)
2011	→ HNK Rijeka (loan)	15	(1)
2013–2014	→ América (loan)	6	(0)
2014–2015	→ Zacatecas (loan)	24	(0)
2015–2018	Puebla	41	(2)
2018	Alebrijes de Oaxaca	13	(0)
2019	Veracruz	24	(0)
2020–2024	Chapulineros de Oaxaca	0	(0)
- * Club domestic league appearances and goals as of 23 November 2019

Carlos Alberto Gutiérrez Armas (born 3 February 1990) is a former Mexican professional footballer who last played as a defensive midfielder for Chapulineros de Oaxaca.

== Club career ==
=== Early career ===
Gutiérrez was born in Guadalajara, Mexico and began playing football professionally for Club Atlas. He played as a defensive midfielder during his time in the team's youth system. He made his professional debut in 2009, and continued playing for the club until 2013. In 2011 Gutiérrez was loaned out to Croatia club HNK Rijeka, playing in ten matches and scoring one goal. He would return to Atlas that same year.

=== América ===
On 6 June 2013 it was announced that Gutiérrez was sold to América, recently crowned champions.

== Honours ==
=== Club ===
Chapulineros de Oaxaca

- Liga de Balompié Mexicano: 2020–21, 2021
