= José Luis Chávez =

Bolivian footballer (born 1984)

Personal information
- Full name: José Luis Chávez Sánchez
- Date of birth: May 18, 1984 (age 42)
- Place of birth: Santa Cruz de la Sierra, Bolivia
- Height: 1.73 m (5 ft 8 in)
- Position: Midfielder

Team information
- Current team: Royal Pari
- Number: 8

Senior career*
Years	Team	Apps	(Gls)
2004–2013	Blooming	162	(14)
2007	→ Destroyers (loan)	28	(2)
2008	→ Universitario (loan)	28	(6)
2013	→ Atlas (loan)	26	(1)
2013–2015	Atlas	1	(0)
2014	→ Blooming (loan)	8	(0)
2014–2015	→ Bolívar (loan)	28	(0)
2015–2016	Blooming	24	(1)
2016–2017	Wilstermann	8	(0)
2018–	Royal Pari	83	(4)

International career
2008–2014	Bolivia	25	(1)
- * Club domestic league appearances and goals as of 23:31, 21 December 2020 (UTC)

José Luis Chávez Sánchez (born 18 May 1984 in Santa Cruz de la Sierra) is a Bolivian football midfielder who currently plays for Bolivian club Royal Pari.

== Club career ==
His former clubs include Bolívar, Destroyers and Universitario de Sucre in the Liga de Fútbol Profesional Boliviano and Atlas of the Liga MX.

== International career ==
Chávez made his debut for Bolivia on August 6, 2008, during a friendly match against Guatemala and has earned a total of 25 caps for the national team, scoring one goal. He represented his country in 9 FIFA World Cup qualification matches and was included in the squad that participated in the 2011 Copa América.

== Honours ==
- Liga de Fútbol Profesional Boliviano: 5

2005 A (Blooming), 2008 A (Universitario), 2009 C (Blooming), 2014 A, 2015 C (Bolívar)
