= Hugo Rodríguez (footballer, born 1990) =

Mexican footballer

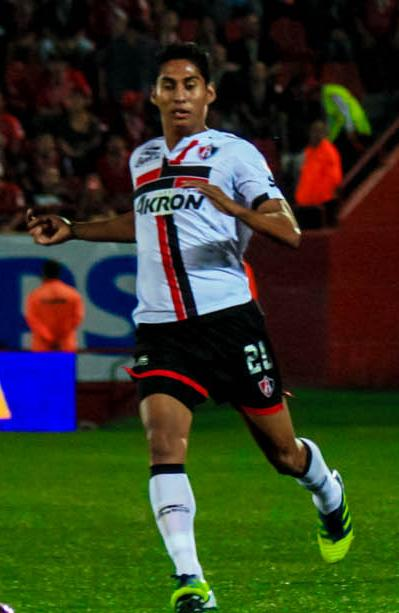
- Rodríguez with Atlas in 2012

Personal information
- Full name: Hugo Isaác Rodríguez de la O
- Date of birth: 8 June 1990 (age 36)
- Place of birth: Guadalajara, Jalisco, Mexico
- Height: 1.83 m (6 ft 0 in)
- Position: Centre-back

Senior career*
Years	Team	Apps	(Gls)
2010–2012	Atlas	51	(5)
2013–2015	Tigres UANL	7	(0)
2014	→ Pachuca (loan)	13	(0)
2015–2016	Pachuca	17	(1)
2016–2017	→ Morelia (loan)	8	(0)
2017	→ Zacatecas (loan)	18	(1)
2017–2018	→ Puebla (loan)	42	(1)
2019–2024	Santos Laguna	105	(6)

International career^{‡}
2011–2012	Mexico U23	10	(0)
2014	Mexico	2	(0)
Medal record
Men's football
Representing Mexico
Olympic Qualifying Championship
Winner	2012 United States
Toulon Tournament
Winner	2012 France	Team
Pan American Games
Gold medal – first place	2011 Guadalajara	Team competition
- * Club domestic league appearances and goals as of 2 November 2024 ‡ National team caps and goals as of 16 October 2022

Hugo Isaác Rodríguez de la O (born 8 June 1990) is a Mexican professional footballer who plays as a centre-back.

== Career ==
Rodríguez debuted on April 10, 2010, with Liga MX club Atlas against Pachuca. On November 12, 2014, he made his international debut with Mexico in a friendly match against the Netherlands.

== Career statistics ==
=== International ===
As of match played 18 November 2014

National team	Year	Apps	Goals
Mexico	2014	2	0
Total		2	0

== Honours ==
Pachuca

- Liga MX: Clausura 2016

Mexico U23

- Pan American Games: 2011
- CONCACAF Olympic Qualifying Championship: 2012
- Toulon Tournament: 2012
