= Alejandro Gallardo =

Mexican footballer (born 1988)

Personal information
- Full name: Jesús Alejandro Gallardo Durazo
- Date of birth: 16 January 1988 (age 38)
- Place of birth: Magdalena de Kino, Sonora, Mexico
- Height: 1.78 m (5 ft 10 in)
- Position: Goalkeeper

Youth career
- Sinaloa

Senior career*
Years	Team	Apps	(Gls)
2006–2007	Dorados	2	(0)
2007–2014	Atlas	14	(0)
2008	→ Veracruz (loan)	0	(0)
2013–2014	→ Atlético San Luis (loan)	12	(0)
2014–2016	Necaxa	33	(0)
2016–2017	Correcaminos UAT	19	(0)
2019–2020	Soles de Sonora (indoor)	13	(2)
Medal record
Representing Mexico
Men's football
FIFA U-17 World Cup
Winner	2005 Peru
- * Club domestic league appearances and goals as of 22 May 2020

Jesús Alejandro Gallardo Durazo (Note: In this Spanish name, the first or paternal surname is Gallardo and the second or maternal family name is Durazo.) (born 16 January 1988) is a former Mexican football goalkeeper who last played for Soles de Sonora in the Major Arena Soccer League.

== Club career ==
Gallardo was a backup goalkeeper for Club Atlas. His debut and only game so far was against Chivas, when José Francisco Canales was sent off; he managed to keep a clean sheet.

== Honours ==
Mexico U17

- FIFA U-17 World Championship: 2005
