= Luis Robles (Mexican footballer) =

Mexican footballer (born 1986)

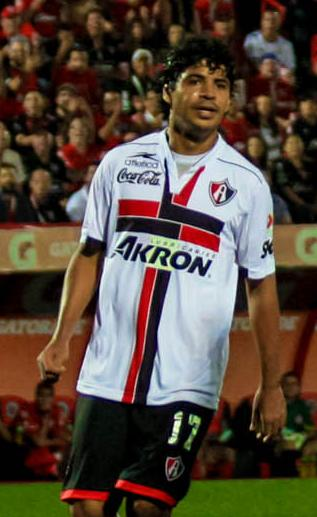
- Robles playing for Atlas

Personal information
- Full name: Luis Enrique Robles Ramírez
- Date of birth: 22 September 1986 (age 40)
- Place of birth: Amacueca, Jalisco, Mexico
- Height: 1.73 m (5 ft 8 in)
- Position: Centre-back

Senior career*
Years	Team	Apps	(Gls)
2004–2013	Atlas	236	(4)
2012	→ Veracruz (loan)	0	(0)
2013–2014	→ Chiapas (loan)	31	(1)
2014–2016	Puebla	44	(2)
2016–2018	Atlas	50	(1)
2018	→ Puebla (loan)	8	(1)
2019–2020	FF Jaro	23	(5)
2020–2023	Tepatitlán	70	(4)

International career
2003	Mexico U17	4	(0)
2006–2008	Mexico U23	3	(0)
2016	Mexico	1	(0)
- * Club domestic league appearances and goals

Luis Enrique Robles Ramírez (Note: In this Spanish name, the first or paternal surname is Robles and the second or maternal family name is Ramírez.) (born 22 September 1986), also known as Macue, is a former Mexican professional footballer who last played as a centre-back for club Tepatitlán.

== International career ==
Robles got his first call up to the senior Mexico side for matches against New Zealand and Panama in October 2016.

== Honours ==
Tepatitlán

- Liga de Expansión MX: Guardianes 2021
- Campeón de Campeones: 2021
