= Manuel Correa (footballer) =

Mexican footballer (born 1993)

Manuel Alejandro Correa Galán (born 6 March 1993) is a Mexican professional footballer who plays for Inter Playa del Carmen. He was born in Guadalajara.
