= Ernest Nungaray =

American footballer (born 1992)

Personal information
- Full name: Ernest Nungaray Arce
- Date of birth: May 7, 1992 (age 34)
- Place of birth: Anaheim, California, United States
- Height: 1.80 m (5 ft 11 in)
- Position: Attacking midfielder

Senior career*
Years	Team	Apps	(Gls)
2011–2013	Monarcas Morelia	0	(0)
2012–2013	Toros Neza	9	(0)
2013	Correcaminos UAT	1	(0)
2014	Delfines de Coatzacoalcos	24	(3)
2015	Veracruz	0	(0)
2015	Albinegros de Orizaba	1	(0)
2015–2016	Atlético Reynosa	12	(0)
2016–2018	Monarcas Morelia II		
2018	Sport Boys	10	(1)
2019	Ayacucho FC	25	(4)
2020	Carlos A. Mannucci	24	(1)
2021	Sport Boys	20	(1)
- * Club domestic league appearances and goals as of 29 March 2023

Ernest Nungaray Arce (born May 7, 1992) is an American former soccer player who played as an attacking midfielder for clubs in Mexico and Peru.

== Career ==
Born in Anaheim, California to Mexican parents, Nungaray began playing football with an amateur side in Tijuana which his father coached. In 2007, he joined the youth system of Monarcas Morelia. He made 13 appearances for Morelia's Ascenso MX affiliate Toros Neza before joining the parent club in Liga MX during 2013.

After failing to feature for Morelia in Liga MX, Nungaray signed with Correcaminos UAT, where he would make a single substitute's appearance in the Ascenso MX. He would later join Tiburones Rojos de Veracruz, but never played for the club in Liga MX before he moved to Liga Premier de Ascenso side Reynosa in 2015. In 2016, Nungaray was playing for Monarcas Morelia Premier in the third level of Mexican football.

Nungaray has dual-citizenship with Mexico and the United States, and has played for the United States men's national under-20 soccer team.

== Personal ==
Nungaray is related to Mexican professional footballer Fernando Arce.
