= Rogelio Chávez =

Mexican footballer (born 1984)

Rogelio Chavez
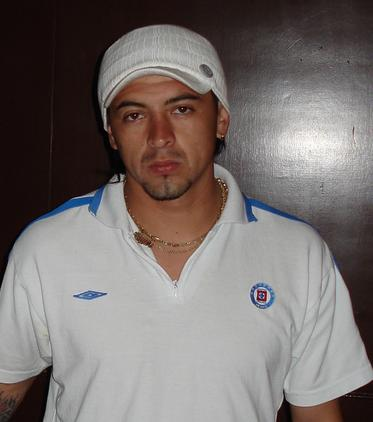
- Chávez in 2008

Personal information
- Full name: Rogelio Alfredo Chávez Martínez
- Date of birth: 28 October 1984 (age 42)
- Place of birth: Tula, Hidalgo, Mexico
- Height: 1.73 m (5 ft 8 in)
- Position: Right back

Senior career*
Years	Team	Apps	(Gls)
2003	Cruz Azul Hidalgo	5	(0)
2004	Cruz Azul Oaxaca	58	(0)
2004–2016	Cruz Azul	208	(9)
2011	→ Pachuca (loan)	16	(1)
2012	→ Atlas (loan)	11	(0)
2016	Melgar	14	(0)
2019	Arka Gdynia II	5	(0)
Total		254	(10)

International career
2014	Mexico	1	(0)
- * Club domestic league appearances and goals

Rogelio Alfredo Chávez Martínez (Note: In this Spanish name, the first or paternal surname is Chávez and the second or maternal family name is Martínez.) (born 28 October 1984) is a Mexican former professional footballer who played as a right back. He was awarded a Balón de Oro of best side defender while playing for Cruz Azul in the Clausura 2009. Chávez was known for his great set-pieces and crossing during his time at Cruz Azul.

== Career ==
=== Cruz Azul ===
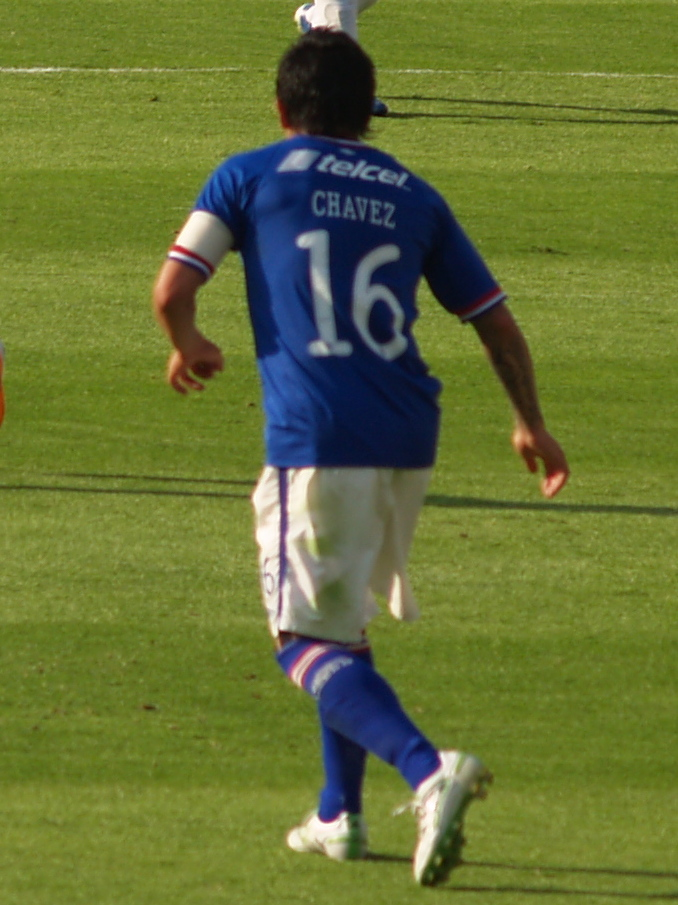
Chávez with Cruz Azul in 2009

Chávez spent most of his professional career at Cruz Azul, playing as a right-back. He won his first major title during the Clausura 2013 Copa MX, starting the final against Atlante on 10 April 2013, which Cruz Azul won 4–2 on penalties. On 21 February 2014, Chávez scored twice in a 3–1 away win against Querétaro. His second goal came from a 50-yard volley from just past the midfield line that went over goalkeeper Edgar Hernández. Later that season, he won the 2013–14 CONCACAF Champions League, starting both legs of the final against Toluca. Before the Clausura 2016 tournament, Cruz Azul management attempted to transfer Chávez to second-division side Alebrijes de Oaxaca. Chávez rejected the move. Following the dispute, manager Tomás Boy left him out of the first-team squad for the entire tournament. Chávez did not make an appearance during the season and left the club as a free agent.

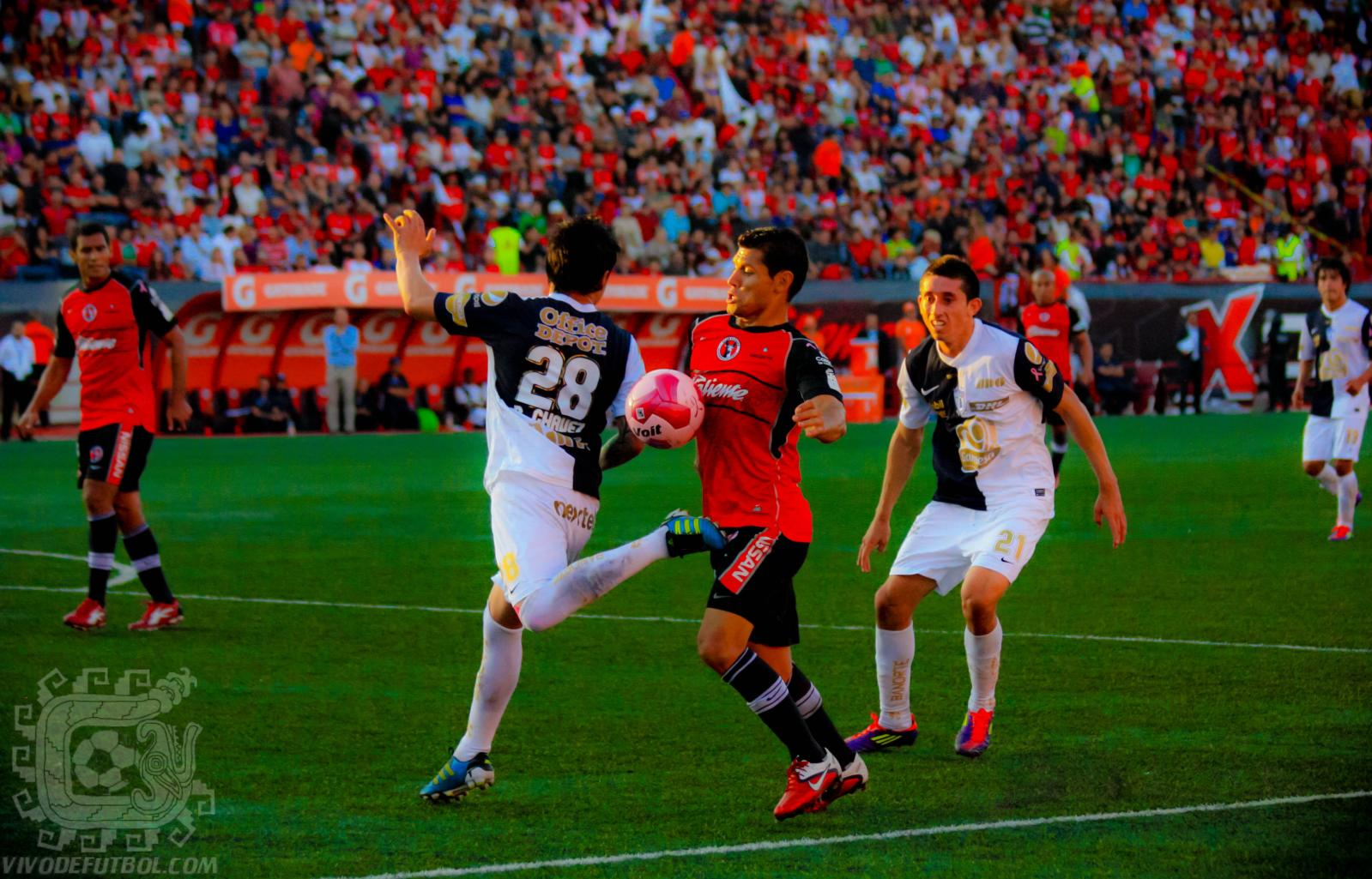
Rogelio Chávez with Pachuca in 2011 wearing the number 28

=== Pachuca ===
Chávez joined Pachuca on a six-month loan deal spanning from June to December 2011. He made his debut for the club on 23 July 2011, playing the full 90 minutes in a 4–1 victory against Santos Laguna. On 29 October 2011, Chávez scored his first and only goal for Pachuca during a 4–0 win over Monterrey. He concluded his short tenure with the team in December 2011 before moving on to his next loan spell.

=== Atlas ===
Following his loan spell at Pachuca, Chávez joined Atlas on a six-month loan agreement for the Clausura 2012 tournament. He made his official debut for the club on 7 January 2012, playing the full 90 minutes in a 0–0 away draw against Puebla. He made 10 league appearances during his temporary stint with the Guadalajara-based side. After completing the six-month term in June 2012, Chávez returned to Cruz Azul.

=== FBC Melgar ===
Chávez signed with Peruvian Primera División side FBC Melgar in August 2016 as a free agent. He made his competitive debut on 25 August 2016, playing the full 90 minutes in a 2–1 home victory against Unión Comercio. Throughout his short stint with the Arequipa-based club, he featured primarily as a right-back, registering 14 league appearances and one Copa Sudamericana appearance before his contract concluded at the end of the year.

=== Arka Gdynia ===
After being without a club for a period, Chávez signed with Polish Ekstraklasa side Arka Gdynia on 28 November 2018. The contract officially took effect on 1 January 2019, when the winter transfer window opened. He made his official and only league appearance for the club on 13 May 2019, coming on as an 80th-minute substitute for Damian Zbozień in a 2–0 away victory against Miedź Legnica. Chávez left the club at the conclusion of his contract in the summer of 2019. He officially retired on July 1, 2020.

== International Career ==
Manager Miguel Herrera called Chávez up to the Mexico national team during the 2013–14 season. He made his senior international debut on 2 April 2014, starting at right-back in a 2–2 friendly draw against the United States in Glendale, Arizona. Paul Aguilar substituted him out in the 63rd minute. This was his only cap for Mexico, as he missed out on the final 23-man squad for the 2014 FIFA World Cup.

== Career Statistics ==
=== Club ===
Appearances and goals by club, season and competition
League Stats
Club	Year	League	Apps	Goals	Assists
Cruz Azul	Apertura 2004	Liga MX	1	0	0
Cruz Azul	Apertura 2005	Liga MX	14	0	0
Cruz Azul	Clausura 2006	Liga MX	13	0	0
Cruz Azul	Apertura 2006	Liga MX	12	0	0
Cruz Azul	Clausura 2007	Liga MX	18	0	1
Cruz Azul	Apertura 2007	Liga MX	18	0	0
Cruz Azul	Clausura 2008	Liga MX	17	0	2
Cruz Azul	Apertura 2008	Liga MX	13	0	2
Cruz Azul	Clausura 2009	Liga MX	7	0	0
Cruz Azul	Apertura 2009	Liga MX	22	3	9
Cruz Azul	Clausura 2010	Liga MX	15	0	1
Cruz Azul	Apertura 2010	Liga MX	16	0	3
Cruz Azul	Clausura 2011	Liga MX	8	0	0
Cruz Azul	Apertura 2012	Liga MX	7	0	0
Cruz Azul	Clausura 2013	Liga MX	9	0	0
Cruz Azul	Apertura 2013	Liga MX	6	1	0
Cruz Azul	Clausura 2014	Liga MX	15	4	2
Cruz Azul	Apertura 2014	Liga MX	17	1	2
Cruz Azul	Clausura 2015	Liga MX	7	0	1
Cruz Azul	Apertura 2015	Liga MX	1	0	0
Cruz Azul	Clausura 2016	Liga MX	0	0	0
Cruz Azul	Total		236	9	23
FBC Melgar	2016	Liga 1	14	0	0
Arka Gdynia	2019	Ekstraklasa	5	0	0
Pachuca (loan)	Apertura 2011	Liga MX	17	1	1
Atlas (loan)	Clausura 2012	Liga MX	11	0	1
Career Total			283	10	25

=== International ===
National team	Year	Apps	Goals
Mexico	2014	1	0
Total		1	0

== Honours ==
Cruz Azul

- Copa MX: Clausura 2013
- CONCACAF Champions League: 2013–14

Individual

- Mexican Primera División Best Full-back of the Tournament: Apertura 2009
