= Luis Télles =

Mexican footballer (born 1992)

Personal information
- Full name: Luis Fernando Télles González
- Date of birth: 9 March 1992 (age 34)
- Place of birth: Leon, Guanajuato, Mexico
- Height: 1.72 m (5 ft 8 in)
- Position: Midfielder

Senior career*
Years	Team	Apps	(Gls)
2010–2013	Atlas	15	(0)
2013–2015	Leones Negros	50	(3)
2015–2016	Atlas	0	(0)
2015–2017	Leones Negros	38	(1)
2017–2018	FC Juárez	35	(1)
2018–2019	Leones Negros	21	(2)
2019	Celaya	9	(1)
2020	Cafetaleros de Chiapas	3	(0)
2020–2022	Salamanca UDS	43	(1)
2022–2024	Cacereño	61	(3)
2024–2025	Coria	29	(2)

International career
2009	Mexico U17	3	(0)
- * Club domestic league appearances and goals as of 4 May 2025

Luis Fernando Télles González (Note: In this Spanish name, the first or paternal surname is Télles and the second or maternal family name is González.) (born 9 March 1992) is a Mexican professional footballer who plays as a midfielder.

== Club career ==
In 2010, Telles was offered a contract by Atlas FC and he went on to play there for three years. Telles was mainly used as a "super sub" in games and rarely ever was featured in the team's starting eleven. Telles spent time developing at Atlas, but in his 3-year career there, he only appeared in 15 games and did not score a goal. In December 2013, Telles was loaned out to Universidad Guadalajara. There in his first season, he and his team won the league Ascenso MX on penalties. His first season there he played seven games and scored a goal. The next season, he was purchased full-time as a member of Universidad Guadalajara. In his first full season, he made 31 appearances and scored two goals. That season was probably his best one yet.

== International career ==
In 2009 Luis Telles was called up to play for the Mexico national under-17 team at the 2009 FIFA U-17 World Cup. He made 3 appearances for the club and played well enough to make his name somewhat known with teams.
