= Facundo Erpen =

Argentine footballer (born 1983)

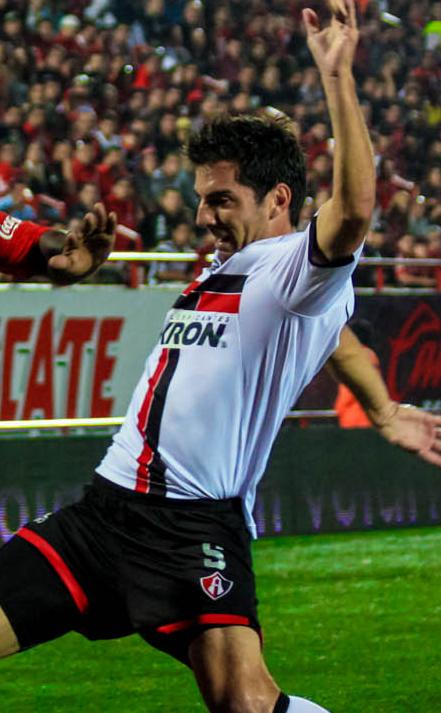

Personal information
- Full name: Facundo Adrián Erpen Bariffo
- Date of birth: May 19, 1983 (age 43)
- Place of birth: Gualeguaychú, Argentina
- Height: 5 ft 11 in (1.80 m)
- Position: Full-back

Youth career
- –1999: Boca Juniors

Senior career*
Years	Team	Apps	(Gls)
1999–2000	Juventud Unida		
2000–2005	Talleres de Córdoba	53	(4)
2005–2007	D.C. United	40	(4)
2007–2008	Colorado Rapids	47	(2)
2009	Miami FC	5	(0)
2009–2011	Instituto	75	(2)
2012–2018	Atlas	95	(2)
2015	→ Puebla (loan)	17	(2)
2015–2017	→ Morelia (loan)	52	(3)
2018–2019	San Martín SJ	13	(1)
2019–2021	Instituto	35	(2)
- * Club domestic league appearances and goals as of 18:13, 25 July 2022 (UTC)

Facundo Adrián Erpen Bariffo (born May 19, 1983, in Gualeguaychú) is an Argentine footballer.

== Career ==
=== Early career in Argentina ===
Erpen was part of the Boca Juniors youth system and played for Club Juventud Unida and Talleres de Córdoba before signing with D.C. United in the summer of 2005.

=== United States ===
Erpen made 40 appearances for D.C. United, scoring 4 goals, and took part in the 2006 MLS All Star game, against FA Premier League champions Chelsea after being called up as a replacement for injured Eddie Pope.

Erpen was traded to the Colorado Rapids for Greg Vanney in June 2007, and played for two seasons for the Denver team before being released January 2009.

He was signed by USL First Division side Miami FC in April 2009, but was waived after having just played five games for the team.

== Honors ==
D.C. United

- Major League Soccer Supporter's Shield: 2006, 2007

Puebla

- Copa MX: Clausura 2015
