= Leandro Cufré =

Argentine footballer

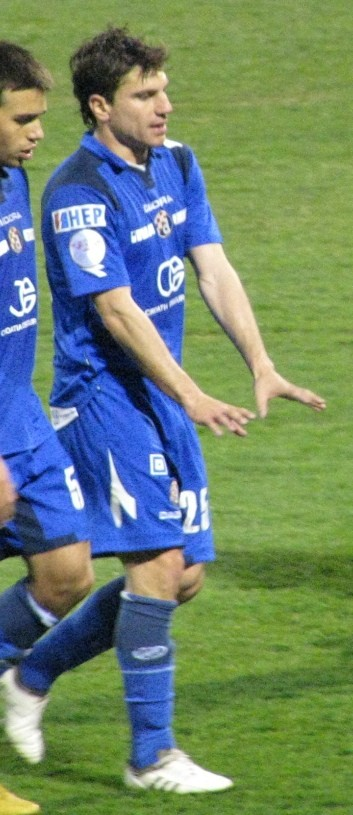
- Cufré (right) with Dinamo Zagreb

Personal information
- Full name: Leandro Damián Cufré
- Date of birth: 9 May 1978 (age 48)
- Place of birth: La Plata, Argentina
- Height: 1.76 m (5 ft 9 in)
- Positions: Left back; centre back

Senior career*
Years	Team	Apps	(Gls)
1996–2002	Gimnasia La Plata	133	(4)
2002–2006	Roma	68	(1)
2003–2004	→ Siena (loan)	31	(0)
2006–2009	Monaco	60	(4)
2009	→ Hertha BSC (loan)	5	(0)
2009–2011	Dinamo Zagreb	53	(0)
2012–2015	Atlas	72	(1)
2014–2015	→ UdeG (loan)	20	(0)
Total		442	(10)

International career
1997	Argentina U20	5	(0)
2000–2006	Argentina	4	(0)

Managerial career
- 2016: Cruz Azul (assistant)
- 2018: Santos Laguna (assistant)
- 2019–2020: Atlas
- 2021–2025: Venezuela (assistant)
Medal record
Competitor for Argentina
Gold medal – first place	FIFA U-20 World Cup	1997
- * Club domestic league appearances and goals as of 8 April 2015

Leandro Damián Cufré (born 9 May 1978) is an Argentine football coach and former player who played as a defender.

Cufré started his professional playing career with hometown side Gimnasia La Plata before transferring to Europe where he played with a number of European clubs, most notably Roma, Monaco and Dinamo Zagreb. In the latter part of his career, he moved to Mexico where he played with primarily Atlas.

Cufre has been capped 4 times for the Argentina national football team and was part of the country's squad for the 2006 FIFA World Cup.

== Club career ==
=== Early career ===
Born in La Plata, Argentina, Cufré began his professional career at Gimnasia La Plata U-19 before being promoted to the first-team squad in January 1996. He went on to play 129 games, scoring four goals in the process.

=== Roma ===
Cufré moved to AS Roma in January 2002. During his time at the Italia Serie A side, he played 80 games, scored two goals and received the award for Best Defender in Italy. He was also loaned out to fellow Italian side Siena, where he played 35 times.

=== Monaco ===
Cufré moved to France in Summer 2006, joining Ligue 1 side AS Monaco During his time at the club, he made 61 appearances and managed to score three goals. Cufré was a regular starter and, eventually, vice-captain of the team.

=== Hertha BSC ===
On 29 January 2009, Bundesliga side Hertha BSC announced that they had loaned Cufré from Monaco until the end of the 2008–09 season. He returned to Monaco in June 2009.

=== Gimnasia La Plata ===
On 18 July 2009, Cufré returned to Gimnasia La Plata after eight years in Europe. On 16 August 2009, after a mini "soap opera," the Argentine wingback asked for – and was granted – his release due to a conflictive relation with Leonardo Madelón, the head coach at the time (though, personal reasons were officially cited).

=== Dinamo Zagreb ===
On 19 August 2009, he officially signed a contract with Croatian champions Dinamo Zagreb who had reportedly been persuading him to join the club since the summer transfer window opened. Cufré became a favourite with the Dinamo fans because of his commitment on the pitch. He played in many important matches for Dinamo. In 2011, he was linked with a transfer to Crvena Zvezda (Red Star Belgrade) but the deal fell through. Cufre played in 53 matches for Dinamo. On 5 December Cufré and Dinamo agreed mutual termination of contract. Argentinian stated that he would be continuing his career in Mexico.

=== Club Atlas ===
On 7 December 2011, same day he officially terminated his contract with Dinamo Zagreb, it was revealed that Cufré would be joining Mexican Club Atlas from Guadalajara.

== International career ==
Leandro Cufré has earned 4 caps for Argentina, his first appearance coming in 2000. He was part of the Argentina Under-20 team that won the 1997 FIFA World Youth Championship in Malaysia.

Cufré was also a member of the Argentina squad for the 2006 FIFA World Cup in Germany. On 30 June 2006, Cufré was red carded for violent conduct in an altercation following Argentina's loss on penalties to Germany in a quarter-final match. Germany's Per Mertesacker said Cufré, an unused substitute in the match, "attacked me even though I did not do anything. I have three or four red marks on my thigh and then he kicked me again in the groin." FIFA president Sepp Blatter said "I am furious about that and our disciplinary committee will monitor this incident. We will take some steps towards those who are identified as being the 'provocateurs' of this incident." FIFA fined Cufré CHF 10,000 and suspended him for four matches.

== Honours ==
Dinamo Zagreb

- Croatian First League: 2009–10, 2010–11
- Croatian Cup: 2010–11
