= Ricardo Bocanegra =

Professional footballer (born 1989)

Personal information
- Full name: Ricardo Roberto Bocanegra Vega
- Date of birth: May 3, 1989 (age 37)
- Place of birth: Las Vegas, Nevada, United States
- Height: 1.80 m (5 ft 11 in)
- Position: Midfielder

Youth career
- 2007–2010: Atlas

Senior career*
Years	Team	Apps	(Gls)
2010–2015	Atlas	54	(2)
2014	→ Irapuato (loan)	12	(0)
2015–2017	Correcaminos UAT	69	(4)
2017	Real Estelí	17	(1)
2018	Murciélagos	10	(0)
2019	New York Cosmos	2	(0)
2019	Charlotte Independence	9	(1)
2020	Atlético Jalisco	0	(0)

International career
2011–2012	Mexico U23	8	(0)
Medal record
Representing Mexico
Pan American Games
Gold medal – first place	2011 Guadalajara	Team competition
- * Club domestic league appearances and goals as of 21 October 2019

Ricardo Roberto Bocanegra Vega (Note: In this Spanish name, the first or paternal surname is Bocanegra and the second or maternal family name is Vega.) (born May 3, 1989) is a former professional footballer who last played as a midfielder for Charlotte Independence in the USL Championship. Born in the United States, he has previously represented the Mexico under-23 national team.

== Personal life ==
Bocanegra was born in Las Vegas, Nevada, but grew up in La Paz, Baja California Sur.

== Club career ==
Bocanegra came from the youth team of Atlas. On 2011 he won the gold medal at the Pan American Games with Mexico.

== Honors ==
Mexico U23

- Pan American Games: 2011
