= Flavio Santos =

Mexican footballer (born 1987)

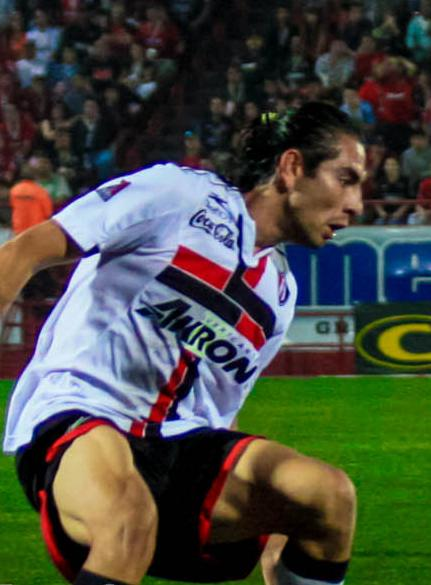
- Santos playing for Atlas

Personal information
- Full name: Flavio Jesús Santos Carrillo
- Date of birth: 1 March 1987 (age 39)
- Place of birth: Ocotlán, Jalisco, Mexico
- Height: 1.65 m (5 ft 5 in)
- Position: Winger

Youth career
- 2006–2008: Atlas

Senior career*
Years	Team	Apps	(Gls)
2008–2016	Atlas	114	(11)
2013	→ Toluca (loan)	10	(1)
2014–2016	→ Puebla (loan)	59	(4)
2017	→ Dorados (loan)	26	(3)
2018	Oaxaca	11	(1)
2019	Malacateco	0	(0)
2019–2022	Juárez	99	(5)
2023–2024	Atlético La Paz	22	(4)

International career
2004	Mexico U17	4	(2)
2006	Mexico U20	8	(3)
- * Club domestic league appearances and goals as of 30 April 2022

Flavio Jesús Santos Carrillo (born 1 March 1987) is a Mexican professional footballer who plays as a winger for Atlético La Paz.

Santos began his playing career in the Atlas youth teams in 2006. He managed to break into the first team on February 2, 2008, during the 1–0 loss to Pachuca. He is also the only Mexican player to score two goals in the same match against an Argentine team during the Toluca victory (3–2) over Boca Juniors.
