= Lucas Ayala =

Mexican footballer and manager (born 1978)

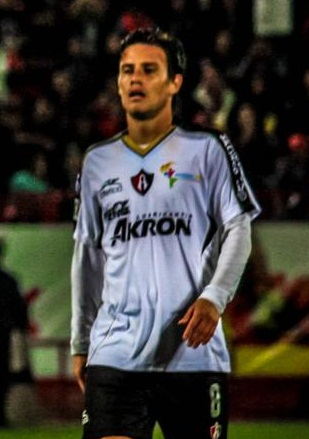
- Ayala playing for Atlas

Personal information
- Full name: Lucas Emanuel Ayala Miño
- Date of birth: 11 August 1978 (age 48)
- Place of birth: Buenos Aires, Argentina
- Height: 1.72 m (5 ft 8 in)
- Position: Midfielder

Youth career
- Racing Club
- Monterrey

Senior career*
Years	Team	Apps	(Gls)
1999	Saltillo		
1999–2000	Tigres de Ciudad Juárez		
2001	Correcaminos		
2002	Tigrillos		
2003	Zacatepec		
2003	Chiapas Reserves		
2004–2007	Veracruz	107	(6)
2007–2010	Tigres UANL	78	(2)
2008–2009	→ Atlas (loan)	16	(1)
2011–2013	Atlas	87	(1)
2014–2017	Correcaminos UAT	38	(1)
Total		326	(11)

International career
2009	Mexico	1	(0)

Managerial career
- 2019–2020: Atlas (assistant)
- 2020–2021: Atlético Veracruz
- 2022: Matamoros
- 2024: Galácticos del Caribe (AKL)
- 2025: Real Titán (AKL)
- * Club domestic league appearances and goals

Lucas Emanuel Ayala Miño (born August 11, 1978) is a former professional footballer who played as a midfielder and current manager of Liga Premier de México club Gavilanes de Matamoros. Born in Argentina, he played for the Mexico national team.

== International career ==
On 16 January 2009, Ayala was called up to the Mexico national team. This caused some controversy among Mexico's native-born. He declared to the media that he wanted to give back the favours that Mexico has granted him such as his footballing career which started in Mexico, not Argentina. He was present with the squad that faced Sweden on 28 January 2009.

=== International caps ===
As of 28 January 2009

International appearances
#	Date	Venue	Opponent	Result	Competition
1.	28 January 2009	Oakland–Alameda County Coliseum, Oakland, United States	Sweden	0–1	Friendly
