= Jesús Paganoni =

Mexican footballer (born 1988)

Personal information
- Full name: Jesús Arturo Paganoni Peña
- Date of birth: 24 September 1988 (age 38)
- Place of birth: Guadalajara, Jalisco, Mexico
- Height: 1.69 m (5 ft 7 in)
- Position: Defender

Youth career
- 2006–2008: Académicos

Senior career*
Years	Team	Apps	(Gls)
2007–2013	Atlas	67	(0)
2012	→ Toluca (loan)	1	(0)
2014	→ Irapuato (loan)	13	(0)
2015–2016	→ Veracruz (loan)	54	(1)
2016–2019	Veracruz	91	(0)
2019–2021	Puebla	8	(0)
- * Club domestic league appearances and goals as of 2 May 2021

Jesús Arturo Paganoni Peña (born 24 September 1988) is a former Mexican professional footballer who played as a defender.

== Career ==
=== Atlas ===
Paganoni began his playing career in the Atlas youth teams in 2006. He managed to break into the first team on April 14, 2007, during a 2–0 loss to Guadalajara in the Clasico Tapatio.

== Personal life ==
Paganoni is of Italian descent.
