= Miguel Pinto =

Chilean football goalkeeper (born 1983)

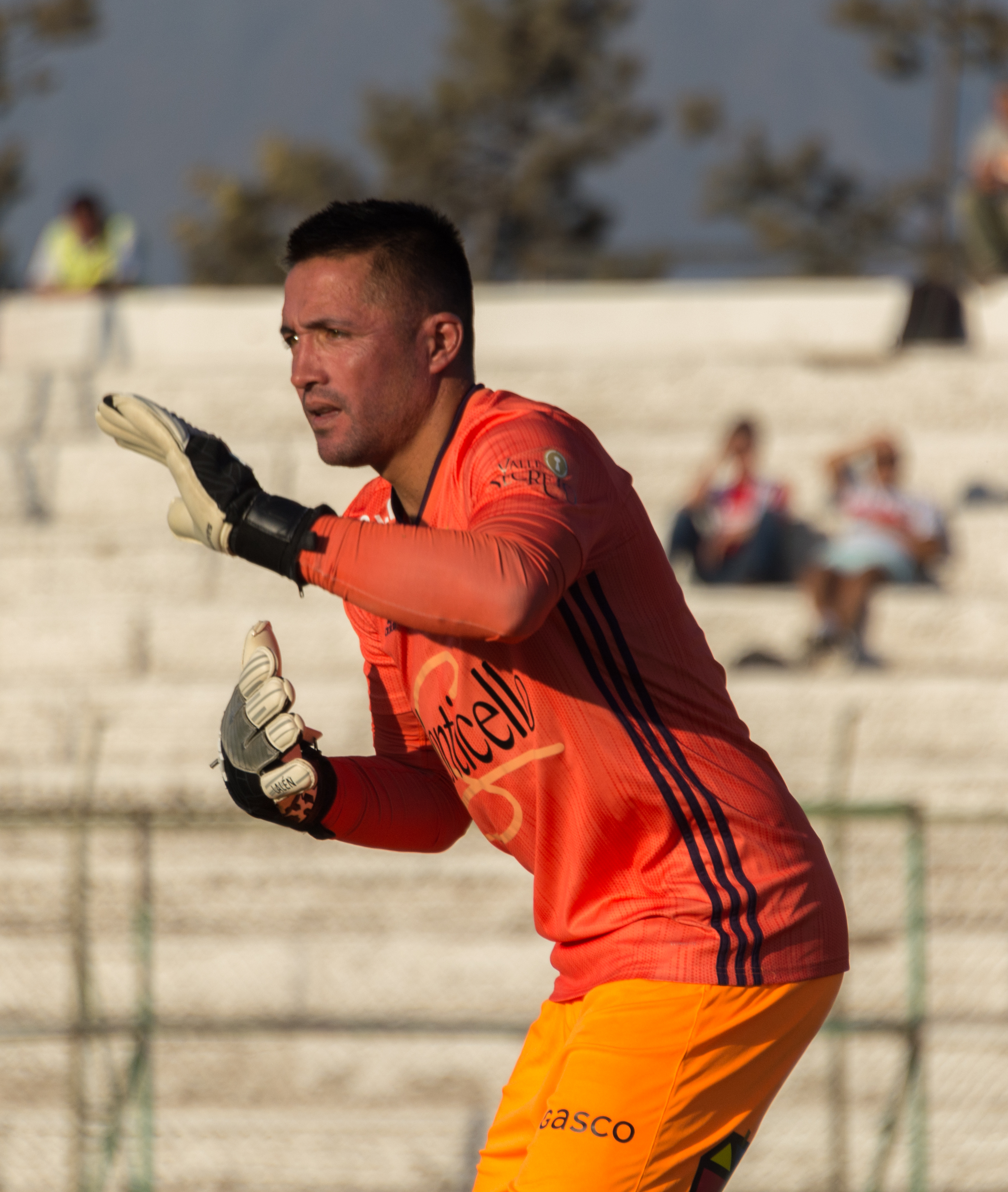
- Pinto with O'Higgins in 2019

Personal information
- Full name: Miguel Ángel Pinto Jerez
- Date of birth: July 4, 1983 (age 43)
- Place of birth: Santiago, Chile
- Height: 1.83 m (6 ft 0 in)
- Position: Goalkeeper

Team information
- Current team: Querétaro (assistant)

Youth career
- Universidad de Chile

Senior career*
Years	Team	Apps	(Gls)
2002–2011	Universidad de Chile	218	(0)
2011–2016	Atlas	103	(0)
2014–2015	→ Correcaminos UAT (loan)	46	(0)
2016	→ Tapachula (loan)	14	(0)
2016–2019	O'Higgins	90	(0)
2020–2021	Colo-Colo	5	(0)
2021–2022	Unión Española	16	(0)
2023–2024	Coquimbo Unido	5	(0)
Total		497	(0)

International career
2006–2016	Chile	21	(0)

Managerial career
- 2025: Coquimbo Unido (assistant)
- 2026–: Querétaro (assistant)
- * Club domestic league appearances and goals

Miguel Ángel Pinto Jerez (born July 4, 1983) is a Chilean former football goalkeeper. He is the current assistant coach of Esteban González in Querétaro.

== Club career ==
=== Universidad de Chile ===
Pinto was born in Santiago, Chile, and was thrust into action in 2002 against Universidad de Chile's biggest rival, Colo-Colo, when the team's first string goalkeeper was injured and the second string goalkeeper was ejected in the same game. In his first action against Colo-Colo he would hold them scoreless, which would foreshadow his future success against the same team. Pinto would be the team's second team goalkeeper for the 2003, 2004 and 2005 season behind Johnny Herrera. Herrera was transferred to Corinthians in 2006 pushing Pinto to become the team's first-choice goalkeeper a position he has held for three years. In 2006 Pinto drew some criticism for his low level of performance. However, in 2007 Pinto was named the best player of the year for Universidad de Chile. After a successful 2008 season, Universidad de Chile qualified for the preliminary round of the Copa Libertadores 2009, which would lead to Pinto's first participation in international club football. Universidad de Chile would go on to defeat Pachuca in the preliminary round with Pinto turning in good performances in both games of the two-legged playoff. In the group stage, Pinto would have an incredible performance against Gremio in Porto Alegre making numerous saves in order to maintain a scoreless draw. In the game Pinto received 25 shots from the Brazilian side. Pinto would go on to play in 10 games during the tournament allowing 11 goals, which has led to rumors that Pinto will be making a move to a Mexican club Cruz Azul in mid-2009 for a reported $1.2 million. Pinto won his first title with Universidad de Chile at the end of the Apertura Tournament 2009. In December 2010 after being eliminated of the "Liguilla" for Copa Libertadores 2011 the president of Universidad de Chile Federico Valdés confirmed the transfer of the player to the Mexican club Atlas, in where he will play on loan from La U.

=== Coquimbo Unido ===
In December 2022, Pinto joined Coquimbo Unido from Unión Española. At the end of the 2024 season, he announced his retirement with views to begin a career as a coach.

== International career ==
Pinto represented Chile in the South American Youth Championship of 2003, which is a Sub-20 tournament. In 2006 Pinto made appearances for the adult side against Ivory Coast and Ireland. Former Chile national coach Nelson Acosta named Pinto as the third goalkeeper for the Copa America 2007 tournament. However Pinto refused to be the third goalkeeper and did not make the trip to Venezuela. In 2007, Argentine coach Marcelo Bielsa took over the Chile national team and he regularly names Pinto as the second goalkeeper behind Claudio Bravo. In May 2009, Pinto along with Chile participated in the Kirin Cup and in two games Pinto allowed five goals.

== Personal life ==
Pinto designs his own goalkeeper jersey, such as former goalkeeper Jose Luis Chilavert. Pinto regularly incorporates a lion or owl into his designs, which are the mascots of Universidad de Chile.

His older brother, Rodrigo, is a former professional football goalkeeper who made an appearance for the Chile national team. Pinto also has a twin brother named Juan Francisco.

Pinto is also known by his nicknames, Miguelito and Criptonita (kryptonite).

He holds Mexican citizenship.

== Coaching career ==
A graduated football manager, Pinto joined the technical staff of Esteban González in Coquimbo Unido as the assistant coach following his retirement in 2024. He follow him to Mexico with Querétaro.

== All-time club statistics ==
Club	Season	League		Cup		America		Total	
Club	Season	Apps	Goals	Apps	Goals	Apps	Goals	Apps	Goals
Universidad de Chile	Apertura 2002	0	0	–		–		0	0
Universidad de Chile	Clausura 2002	6	0	–		–		6	0
Universidad de Chile	Apertura 2003	2	0	–		-		2	0
Universidad de Chile	Clausura 2003	17	0	0	0	0	0	17	0
Universidad de Chile	Apertura 2004	3	0	0	0	0	0	3	0
Universidad de Chile	Clausura 2004	1	0	0	0	0	0	1	0
Universidad de Chile	Apertura 2005	8	0	0	0	0	0	8	0
Universidad de Chile	Clausura 2005	4	0	0	0	0	0	4	0
Universidad de Chile	Apertura 2006	21	0	0	0	0	0	21	0
Universidad de Chile	Clausura 2006	21	0	0	0	0	0	21	0
Universidad de Chile	Apertura 2007	20	0	0	0	0	0	20	0
Universidad de Chile	Clausura 2007	24	0	0	0	0	0	24	0
Universidad de Chile	Apertura 2008	22	0	0	0	0	0	22	0
Universidad de Chile	Clausura 2008	20	0	0	0	0	0	20	0
Universidad de Chile	Apertura 2009	19	0	0	0	0	0	19	0
Universidad de Chile	Clausura 2009	11	0	0	0	4	0	16	0
Universidad de Chile	Apertura 2010	19	0	0	0	10	0	29	0
Career totals Universidad de Chile		218	0	0	0	14	0	232	0

- America = Sudamericana y Libertadores

== Honours ==
=== Player ===
Universidad de Chile

- Primera División de Chile (2): 2004 Apertura, 2009 Apertura

Individual

- America best goalkeeper: 2009
- Copa Sudamericana best goalkeeper (1): 2009

=== Assistant ===
Coquimbo Unido

- Chilean Primera División: 2025
