= Jahir Barraza =

Mexican footballer (born 1990)

Personal information
- Full name: Jahir Alejandro Barraza Flores
- Date of birth: 17 September 1990 (age 36)
- Place of birth: Delicias, Chihuahua, Mexico
- Height: 1.78 m (5 ft 10 in)
- Position: Forward

Youth career
- 2007–2008: Dorados

Senior career*
Years	Team	Apps	(Gls)
2008–2017	Atlas	87	(11)
2015	→ UdeG (loan)	10	(0)
2015–2016	→ Necaxa (loan)	38	(14)
2017–2018	→ Atlético San Luis (loan)	7	(0)
2018	→ Venados (loan)	10	(0)
2019	San Antonio FC	0	(0)
2019	FF Jaro	25	(15)
2020	Sonora	5	(0)
2020	Atlético Jalisco	0	(0)
2020–2021	Malacateco	11	(3)
2022	Santa Tecla	18	(4)
2022	Águila	11	(1)
2023	Tepatitlán	7	(0)
- * Club domestic league appearances and goals as of 9 April 2023

Jahir Alejandro Barraza Flores (born 17 September 1990) is a Mexican professional footballer who plays as a forward.

== Biography ==
Born in Delicias, Chihuahua, Barraza started his career at Dorados Fuerzas Basicas of Tercera División de México. In 2008–09 season he was signed by Atlas and joined their Filial Team Académicos, at Primera División A, Atlas B Team at Segunda División and C team at Tercera División. He made his Primera A debut, on January 17, 2009, in a 1–1 tie with Albinegros de Orizaba.

After the fold of Académicos team, in 2009–10 season he played for Atlas B at Segunda División and Fuerzas Basicas U20 Team at Fuerzas Basicas U20 League (Which Atlas had team played from 2nd division to 7 division). In the Copa MX Apertura 2013, Barraza was the top scorer.

On 15 January 2019, Barraza joined San Antonio FC of the USL Championship. However, San Antonio and Barraza mutually agreed to terminate the loan after just one-month at the club. After a trial at FF Jaro in Finland, he signed a one-year loan deal on 10 April 2019.

== U-23 International appearances ==
As of 22 February 2012

International appearances
#	Date	Venue	Opponent	Result	Competition
1.	September 7, 2011	Estadio La Granja, Curicó, Chile	Chile	2–2	Friendly
2.	22 February 2012	Ciudad Nezahualcóyotl, Mexico	(Mexico) Toros Neza	4–2	Friendly

== U-23 International Goals ==
Goal	Date	Venue	Opponent	Score	Result	Competition
1.	22 February 2012	Ciudad Nezahualcóyotl, Mexico	(Mexico) Toros Neza	2–0	4–2	Friendly
