= 2014 Toulon Tournament squads =

Football tournament squads

Below are the squads for the 2014 Toulon Tournament. Each team had to submit a maximum of 22 players.

Players in boldface have been capped at full international level at some point in their career.

== Group A ==
=== France ===
Coach: (France) Ludovic Batelli

No.	Pos.	Player	Date of birth (age)	Caps	Club
1	GK	Paul Nardi	18 May 1994 (aged 20)	2	(France) Nancy
2	DF	**Jordan Ikoko**	3 February 1994 (aged 20)	5	(France) Créteil
3	DF	Mouhamadou-Naby Sarr	13 August 1993 (aged 20)	8	(France) Lyon
4	DF	**Antoine Conte**	29 January 1994 (aged 20)	3	(France) Reims
5	DF	Mory Koné	21 January 1994 (aged 20)	3	(Italy) Crotone
6	DF	Théo Pellenard	4 March 1994 (aged 20)	0	(France) Bordeaux
7	FW	Jean-Christophe Bahebeck	1 May 1993 (aged 21)	12	(France) Valenciennes
8	MF	**Adrien Rabiot**	3 April 1995 (aged 19)	0	(France) Paris Saint-Germain
9	FW	**Hadi Sacko**	24 March 1994 (aged 20)	6	(France) Le Havre
10	FW	**Lenny Nangis**	24 March 1994 (aged 20)	6	(France) Caen
11	MF	**Rafidine Abdullah**	15 January 1994 (aged 20)	3	(France) Lorient
12	DF	Jordan Amavi	9 March 1994 (aged 20)	3	(France) Nice
13	FW	**Sébastien Haller**	22 June 1994 (aged 19)	3	(France) Auxerre
14	MF	**Tiémoué Bakayoko**	17 August 1994 (aged 19)	0	(France) Rennes
15	MF	Adrien Hunou	19 January 1994 (aged 20)	3	(France) Rennes
16	GK	**Mouez Hassen**	5 March 1995 (aged 19)	0	(France) Nice
17	DF	**Steven Moreira**	13 August 1994 (aged 19)	1	(France) Rennes
18	FW	Gaëtan Laborde	3 May 1994 (aged 20)	2	(France) Red Star
19	MF	Benjamin Bourigeaud	14 January 1994 (aged 20)	0	(France) Lens
20	FW	Wesley Saïd	19 April 1995 (aged 19)	0	(France) Rennes

=== Mexico ===
Coach: (Mexico) Raúl Gutiérrez

No.	Pos.	Player	Date of birth (age)	Caps	Club
1	GK	Luis Cárdenas	15 September 1993 (aged 20)		(Mexico) Monterrey
2	DF	**José Abella**	10 February 1994 (aged 20)		(Mexico) Santos Laguna
3	DF	**Hedgardo Marín**	21 February 1993 (aged 21)		(Mexico) Guadalajara
4	DF	Antonio Briseño	5 February 1994 (aged 20)		(Mexico) Atlas
5	DF	Bernardo Hernández	10 June 1993 (aged 20)		(Mexico) Monterrey
6	DF	**Josecarlos Van Rankin**	14 May 1993 (aged 21)		(Mexico) UNAM
7	MF	Armando Zamorano	3 October 1993 (aged 20)		(Mexico) Morelia
8	MF	Julio Gómez	13 August 1994 (aged 19)		(Mexico) Guadalajara
9	FW	Carlos Fierro	24 July 1994 (aged 19)		(Mexico) Guadalajara
10	MF	**Alfonso González**	5 September 1994 (aged 19)		(Mexico) Atlas
11	FW	Martín Zúñiga	14 April 1993 (aged 21)		(Mexico) Chiapas
12	GK	Richard Sánchez	5 April 1994 (aged 20)		(United States) FC Dallas
13	DF	Carlos Guzmán	19 May 1994 (aged 20)		(Mexico) Puebla
14	DF	Luis Solorio	1 August 1994 (aged 19)		(Mexico) Guadalajara
15	MF	Carlos Treviño	19 April 1993 (aged 21)		(Mexico) Atlas
16	MF	Jonathan Espericueta	9 August 1994 (aged 19)		(Spain) Villarreal B
17	MF	**Alonso Escoboza**	22 January 1993 (aged 21)		(Mexico) Santos
18	DF	**Rodolfo Pizarro**	15 October 1994 (aged 19)		(Mexico) Pachuca
19	MF	Marcelo Gracia	2 April 1994 (aged 20)		(Mexico) Monterrey
20	MF	Daniel Hernández	16 February 1994 (aged 20)		(Mexico) Atlas

=== China ===
Coach: (China) Fu Bo

No.	Pos.	Player	Date of birth (age)	Caps	Club
1	GK	Fang Jingqi	17 January 1993 (aged 21)		(China) Guangzhou Evergrande
2	DF	**Liu Yiming**	28 February 1995 (aged 19)		(Portugal) Sporting B
3	DF	Mi Haolun	1 October 1993 (aged 20)		(China) Shandong Luneng
4	DF	Yang Ting	4 June 1993 (aged 20)		(China) Chengdu Tiancheng
5	DF	Wang Rui	24 April 1993 (aged 21)		(China) Qingdao Hainiu
6	DF	**Wang Tong**	2 June 1993 (aged 20)		(China) Shandong Luneng
7	MF	**Xu Xin**	19 April 1994 (aged 20)		(Spain) Atlético Madrid C
8	MF	**Wang Shangyuan**	2 June 1993 (aged 20)		(Belgium) Club Brugge
9	FW	**Yang Chaosheng**	22 July 1993 (aged 20)		(China) Guangzhou Evergrande
10	MF	Luo Senwen	16 January 1993 (aged 21)		(China) Shandong Luneng
11	DF	Wang Xinhui	2 January 1993 (aged 21)		(China) Guangzhou R&F
12	GK	Yerjet Yerzat	4 January 1993 (aged 21)		(Portugal) Gondomar S.C.
13	MF	Guo Sheng	7 January 1993 (aged 21)		(China) Guizhou Renhe
14	MF	Jia Tianzi	28 February 1994 (aged 20)		(Portugal) S.C. Covilha
15	MF	Cui Ming'an	15 November 1994 (aged 19)		(China) Dalian Aerbin
16	DF	Liao Junjian	27 January 1994 (aged 20)		(China) Guangdong Sunray Cave
17	DF	**Xie Pengfei**	29 June 1993 (aged 20)		(China) Hangzhou Greentown
18	FW	Zhang Wei	19 January 1993 (aged 21)		(China) Jiangsu Sainty
19	MF	Guo Yi	29 January 1993 (aged 21)		(Portugal) C.D. Tondela
20	MF	**Li Yuanyi**	28 August 1993 (aged 20)		(Portugal) Boavista

=== Chile ===
Coach: (Argentina) Claudio Vivas

No.	Pos.	Player	Date of birth (age)	Caps	Club
1	GK	Álvaro Salazar	24 March 1993 (aged 21)		(Chile) Colo-Colo
2	DF	Camilo Rodríguez	4 March 1995 (aged 19)		(Chile) Colo-Colo
3	DF	Guillermo Díaz	16 May 1994 (aged 20)		Universidad de Chile
4	DF	Raúl Osorio	29 June 1995 (aged 18)		(Chile) O'Higgins
5	DF	**Igor Lichnovsky**	7 March 1994 (aged 20)		Universidad de Chile
6	MF	**Sebastián Martínez**	6 June 1993 (aged 20)		Universidad de Chile
7	FW	**Christian Bravo**	1 October 1993 (aged 20)		(Spain) Granada
8	DF	**Andrés Robles**	7 May 1994 (aged 20)		(Chile) Santiago Wanderers
9	MF	**Felipe Mora**	2 August 1993 (aged 20)		(Chile) Audax Italiano
10	MF	Diego Rojas	15 February 1995 (aged 19)		(Chile) Universidad Católica
11	FW	**Juan Delgado**	5 March 1993 (aged 21)		(Chile) Colo-Colo
12	GK	**Brayan Cortés**	29 May 1995 (aged 18)		(Chile) Deportes Iquique
13	MF	**Joaquín Montecinos**	7 December 1995 (aged 18)		(Chile) La Serena
14	DF	Nicolás Vargas	7 December 1995 (aged 18)		(Chile) O'Higgins
15	MF	**Cristián Cuevas**	15 September 1993 (aged 20)		(Netherlands) FC Eindhoven
16	MF	César Fuentes	12 April 1993 (aged 21)		(Chile) O'Higgins
17	DF	Luis Pavez	17 September 1995 (aged 18)		(Chile) Colo-Colo
18	FW	**Nicolás Castillo**	14 February 1993 (aged 21)		(Belgium) Club Brugge
19	MF	Fabián Carmona	21 March 1994 (aged 20)		Universidad de Chile
20	MF	**Claudio Baeza**	23 December 1993 (aged 20)		(Chile) Colo-Colo

=== Portugal ===
Coach: (Portugal) Ilídio Vale

No.	Pos.	Player	Date of birth (age)	Caps	Club
1	GK	**Bruno Varela**	11 April 1994 (aged 20)		(Portugal) Benfica
2	DF	**João Cancelo**	27 May 1994 (aged 19)		(Portugal) Benfica
3	DF	Rúben Vezo	25 April 1994 (aged 20)		(Spain) Valencia
4	DF	Tobias Figueiredo	2 February 1994 (aged 20)		(Portugal) Sporting CP
5	DF	Rafael Floro	19 January 1994 (aged 20)		(England) Sheffield Wednesday
6	DF	Fábio Cardoso	19 April 1994 (aged 20)		(Portugal) Benfica
7	MF	**Ricardo Horta**	15 September 1994 (aged 19)		(Portugal) Vitória de Setúbal
8	DF	Leandro Silva	4 May 1994 (aged 20)		(Portugal) Porto
9	FW	**Carlos Fortes**	9 November 1994 (aged 19)		(Spain) Racing Santander
10	FW	Iuri Medeiros	10 February 1994 (aged 20)		(Portugal) Sporting CP
11	FW	**Hélder Costa**	12 January 1994 (aged 20)		(Portugal) Benfica
12	GK	**Rui Silva**	7 February 1994 (aged 20)		(Portugal) Nacional
13	DF	**Rúben Semedo**	4 April 1994 (aged 20)		(Portugal) Sporting CP
14	MF	Fábio Carvalho	21 December 1993 (aged 20)		(Portugal) Feirense
15	MF	**Bruno Fernandes**	8 September 1994 (aged 19)		(Italy) Udinese
16	MF	Kiki	10 December 1994 (aged 19)		(Portugal) Atlético CP
17	MF	Fábio Sturgeon	4 February 1994 (aged 20)		(Portugal) Belenenses
18	FW	Alexandre Guedes	11 February 1994 (aged 20)		(Portugal) Sporting CP
19	MF	Claude Gonçalves	9 April 1994 (aged 20)		(France) Ajaccio
20	MF	João Teixeira	6 February 1994 (aged 20)		(Portugal) Benfica

== Group B ==
=== Brazil ===
Coach: Alexandre Gallo

No.	Pos.	Player	Date of birth (age)	Caps	Club
1	GK	Marcos	13 April 1996 (aged 18)	0	(Brazil) Fluminense
2	DF	Gilberto	7 March 1993 (aged 21)	0	(Brazil) Internacional
3	DF	**Marquinhos**	14 May 1994 (aged 20)	0	(France) Paris Saint-Germain
4	DF	**Dória**	8 November 1994 (aged 19)	0	(Brazil) Botafogo
5	MF	**Rodrigo Caio**	17 August 1993 (aged 20)	0	(Brazil) São Paulo
6	DF	**Wendell**	20 July 1993 (aged 20)	0	(Brazil) Grêmio
7	FW	**Leandro**	12 May 1993 (aged 21)	0	(Brazil) Palmeiras
8	MF	Lucas Silva	16 February 1993 (aged 21)	0	(Brazil) Cruzeiro
9	FW	Thalles	18 May 1995 (aged 19)	0	(Brazil) Vasco da Gama
10	FW	Ademilson	9 January 1994 (aged 20)	0	(Brazil) São Paulo
11	MF	Alisson	25 June 1993 (aged 20)	0	(Brazil) Cruzeiro
12	GK	**Ederson**	17 August 1993 (aged 20)	0	(Portugal) Rio Ave
13	DF	Auro Jr.	23 January 1996 (aged 18)	0	(Brazil) São Paulo
14	DF	Wallace	14 October 1994 (aged 19)	0	(Brazil) Cruzeiro
15	MF	Alison	1 March 1993 (aged 21)	0	(Brazil) Santos
16	DF	**Douglas Santos**	22 March 1994 (aged 20)	0	(Italy) Udinese
17	MF	Lucas Evangelista	6 May 1995 (aged 19)	0	(Brazil) São Paulo
18	FW	**Luan**	27 March 1993 (aged 21)	0	(Brazil) Grêmio
19	FW	Mosquito	6 January 1996 (aged 18)	0	(Brazil) Atlético Paranaense
20	FW	Lucas Piazon	20 January 1994 (aged 20)	0	(England) Chelsea

=== England ===
Coach: (England) Gareth Southgate

No.	Pos.	Player	Date of birth (age)	Caps	Club
1	GK	**Jack Butland**	10 March 1993 (aged 21)		(England) Stoke City
2	DF	**Tyias Browning**	27 May 1994 (aged 19)		(England) Everton
3	DF	**Eric Dier**	15 January 1994 (aged 20)		(Portugal) Sporting CP
4	DF	Luke Garbutt	21 May 1993 (aged 21)		(England) Everton
5	DF	**Michael Keane**	11 January 1993 (aged 21)		(England) Manchester United
6	MF	Josh McEachran	1 March 1993 (aged 21)		(England) Chelsea
7	MF	**Nathan Redmond**	6 March 1994 (aged 20)		(England) Norwich City
8	MF	**James Ward-Prowse**	1 November 1994 (aged 19)		(England) Southampton
9	FW	**Saido Berahino**	4 August 1993 (aged 20)		(England) West Bromwich Albion
10	FW	**Harry Kane**	28 July 1993 (aged 20)		(England) Tottenham Hotspur
11	FW	**Jordan Obita**	8 December 1993 (aged 20)		(England) Reading
12	DF	**Liam Moore**	31 January 1993 (aged 21)		(England) Leicester City
14	GK	Jonathan Bond	19 May 1993 (aged 21)		(England) Watford
15	MF	**Jordan Cousins**	6 March 1994 (aged 20)		(England) Charlton Athletic
16	MF	Jake Forster-Caskey	25 April 1994 (aged 20)		(England) Brighton & Hove Albion
17	DF	**Brad Smith**	9 April 1994 (aged 20)		(England) Liverpool
18	DF	Ben Gibson	1 March 1993 (aged 21)		(England) Middlesbrough
19	FW	Solly March	20 July 1994 (aged 19)		(England) Brighton & Hove Albion
20	FW	Cauley Woodrow	2 December 1994 (aged 19)		(England) Fulham

=== Colombia ===
Coach: (Colombia) Carlos Alberto Restrepo Isaza

No.	Pos.	Player	Date of birth (age)	Caps	Club
1	GK	Luis Erney Vásquez	1 March 1996 (aged 18)		(Colombia) Independiente Medellín
2	DF	Aldayr Hernández	4 August 1995 (aged 18)		(Colombia) Bogotá F.C.
3	DF	Jeison Angulo	27 June 1996 (aged 17)		(Colombia) Deportivo Cali
4	DF	Daniel Londoño	1 January 1995 (aged 19)		(Colombia) Envigado
5	DF	Juan Sebastián Quintero	23 March 1995 (aged 19)		(Colombia) Deportivo Cali
6	MF	Andrés Felipe Tello	6 September 1996 (aged 17)		(Colombia) Envigado
7	FW	**Cristian Arango**	9 March 1995 (aged 19)		(Colombia) Envigado
8	MF	Alexis Zapata	10 May 1995 (aged 19)		(Italy) Udinese
9	FW	Joao Rodríguez	19 May 1996 (aged 18)		(France) Bastia
11	FW	Gustavo Torres	15 June 1996 (aged 17)		(Colombia) Deportes Quindío
12	GK	**Álvaro Montero**	29 March 1995 (aged 19)		(Brazil) São Caetano
13	DF	**Davinson Sánchez**	12 June 1996 (aged 17)		(Colombia) Atlético Nacional
14	MF	Sebastián Ayala	14 September 1995 (aged 18)		(Colombia) La Equidad
15	MF	Rodin Quiñónes	30 May 1995 (aged 18)		(Colombia) Atlético Nacional
16	MF	Jarlan Barrera	16 September 1995 (aged 18)		(Colombia) Junior F.C.
17	MF	Carlos Enrique Rentería	5 July 1995 (aged 18)		(Colombia) Deportivo Cali
18	MF	Juan Alberto Mosquera	10 February 1996 (aged 18)		(Colombia) Envigado
19	FW	Darío Andrés Rodríguez	15 May 1995 (aged 19)		(Colombia) Santa Fe
20	FW	**Rafael Santos Borré**	15 September 1995 (aged 18)		(Colombia) Deportivo Cali
21	DF	**Luis Manuel Orejuela**	20 August 1995 (aged 18)		(Colombia) Deportivo Cali

=== Qatar ===
Coach: (Spain) Félix Sánchez Bas

No.	Pos.	Player	Date of birth (age)	Caps	Club
1	GK	**Youssef Hassan**	24 May 1996 (aged 17)		(Spain) Villarreal
4	MF	**Abdullah Ali**	10 May 1997 (aged 17)		(Spain) Real Madrid
5	DF	Serigne Abdou	28 February 1995 (aged 19)		(Qatar) Al Khor
6	DF	Abdulaziz Al Khalosi	13 November 1995 (aged 18)		(Belgium) Eupen II
7	MF	Husam Kamal	25 January 1996 (aged 18)		(France) Auxerre
8	MF	**Ahmed Doozandeh**	20 October 1995 (aged 18)		(Belgium) Eupen II
10	FW	**Akram Afif**	18 November 1996 (aged 17)		(Spain) Sevilla
11	FW	Said Brahmi	26 April 1995 (aged 19)		(Qatar) Al Khor
12	DF	Jassim Omar	18 April 1995 (aged 19)		(Austria) Red Bull Salzburg
13	FW	**Sultan Al Berik**	7 April 1995 (aged 19)		(France) AS Monaco
14	MF	Ahmed Al Saadi	2 October 1995 (aged 18)		(Belgium) Eupen II
16	DF	**Tamim Al Muhaize**	21 July 1996 (aged 17)		(Spain) Atlético Madrid
17	MF	Jassim Al-Shammari	15 October 1996 (aged 17)		(Spain) Villarreal
18	MF	**Assim Madebo**	22 October 1996 (aged 17)		(France) Auxerre
19	FW	Muath Al Abdien	19 August 1996 (aged 17)		(Qatar) Lekhwiya
20	MF	Muath Salemi	15 August 1996 (aged 17)		(Austria) Red Bull Salzburg
21	MF	Nasser Ibrahim Al-Nasr	11 May 1995 (aged 19)		(Spain) Villarreal
22	GK	**Mohamed Al Bakri**	28 March 1997 (aged 17)		(Qatar) Lekhwiya
23	FW	**Fahad Abdulrahman**	6 April 1995 (aged 19)		(Belgium) Eupen II
2	DF	**Salem Al Hajri**	10 April 1996 (aged 18)		(Qatar) Al Sadd

=== South Korea ===
Coach: Lee Kwang-Jong

No.	Pos.	Player	Date of birth (age)	Caps	Club
	GK	Lee Jun-hee	10 December 1993 (aged 20)	0	(South Korea) Incheon National University
	GK	**Kim Dong-jun**	19 December 1994 (aged 19)	0	(South Korea) Yonsei University
	DF	Sim Sang-min	21 May 1993 (aged 21)	0	(South Korea) FC Seoul
	DF	Kang Yun-koo	8 February 1993 (aged 21)	0	(Japan) Oita Trinita
	DF	Yeon Jei-min	28 May 1993 (aged 20)	0	(South Korea) Suwon Samsung Bluewings
	DF	Woo Joo-sung	8 June 1993 (aged 20)	0	(South Korea) Gyeongnam FC
	DF	Kim Yong-Hwan	25 May 1993 (aged 20)	0	(South Korea) Incheon United FC
	DF	Gam Han-sol	16 November 1993 (aged 20)	0	(South Korea) Kyung Hee University
	MF	Kim Sun-woo	19 April 1993 (aged 21)	0	(South Korea) University of Ulsan
	MF	**Lee Chang-min**	20 January 1994 (aged 20)	0	(South Korea) Gyeongnam FC
	MF	Oh Chang-hyeon	2 March 1993 (aged 21)	0	(South Korea) Dankook University
	MF	Sin Il-soo	4 September 1994 (aged 19)	0	(South Korea) Korea University
	MF	Lee Gwang-hoon	26 November 1993 (aged 20)	0	(South Korea) Pohang Steelers
	MF	Jang Hyun-soo	1 January 1993 (aged 21)	0	(South Korea) Yong In University
	MF	Am Hyeon-beom	21 December 1994 (aged 19)	0	(South Korea) Dongguk University
	MF	**Kang Sang-Woo**	7 October 1993 (aged 20)	0	(South Korea) Pohang Steelers
	FW	Moon Chang-jin	12 July 1993 (aged 20)	0	(South Korea) Pohang Steelers
	FW	Ryu Seung-woo	17 December 1993 (aged 20)	0	(Germany) Bayer Leverkusen
	FW	Kim Hyun	3 May 1993 (aged 21)	0	(South Korea) Jeju United FC
	FW	Cho Suk-jae	24 March 1993 (aged 21)	0	(South Korea) Konkuk University
