= 2014 Toulon Tournament Group A =

Group A of the 2014 Toulon Tournament was one of two groups competing of nations at 2014 Toulon Tournament. The group's first round of matches were played on 21 May 2014, with the final round played on 29 May. All ten matches were played at venues in France, in Toulon, Hyères, Aubagne and Saint-Raphaël. The group consisted of four previous champions, including France, as well as Portugal, Chile and Mexico and China, the latter which reached the final in 2007.

== Standings ==
Team	Pld	W	D	L	GF	GA	GD	Pts	Qualification
France	4	3	1	0	8	2	+6	10	Qualified for finals
Portugal	4	3	0	1	10	4	+6	9	Qualified for 3rd place match
Mexico	4	1	1	2	3	6	−3	4	
China	4	0	2	2	5	9	−4	2	
Chile	4	0	2	2	6	11	−5	2	

Source: Toulon Tournament

All Times are Central European Summer Time (CEST)

== Mexico vs Portugal ==
May 21, 2014
17:15 CEST

Mexico	0 – 2	Portugal
	Report	Teixeira 27'; Costa 73'

Stade Léo-Lagrange, Toulon
Referee: Francisco de Nascimiento (Brazil)

Mexico	Portugal

MEXICO:
GK	1	Luis Cárdenas
DF	3	Hedgardo Marín
DF	4	Antonio Briseño (c)
DF	5	Bernardo Hernández
DF	13	Carlos Guzmán
MF	6	Josecarlos Van Rankin (yellow card) 68'
MF	7	Armando Zamorano
MF	8	Julio Gómez (substituted off) 61'
MF	10	Alfonso González (substituted off) 61'
FW	9	Carlos Fierro (substituted off) 66'
FW	11	Martín Zúñiga
Substitutions:
MF	16	Jonathan Espericueta	(substituted on) 61'
MF	17	Alonso Escoboza	(substituted on) 61'
FW	19	Marcelo Gracia	(substituted on) 66'
Manager:
(Mexico) Raúl Gutiérrez

PORTUGAL:
GK	1	Bruno Varela
RB	2	João Cancelo
CB	3	Rúben Vezo
CB	4	Tobias Figueiredo (c)
LB	5	Rafael Floro
RM	15	Bruno Fernandes	(substituted off) 80'
CM	19	Claude Gonçalves
CM	8	Leandro Silva
LM	18	Alexandre Guedes	(substituted off) 77'
SS	7	Ricardo Horta	(substituted off) 68'
CF	20	João Teixeira	(substituted off) 77'
Substitutions:
MF	11	Hélder Costa	(substituted on) 68'
FW	6	Fábio Cardoso	(substituted on) 77'
FW	9	Carlos Fortes	(substituted on) 77'
FW	17	Fábio Sturgeon	(substituted on) 80'
Manager:
(Portugal) Ilídio Vale

Assistant referees:
Rios Barretos (Brazil)
Me Back (Brazil)
Fourth official:
Pontón Rodríguez (Colombia)

== France vs Chile ==
21 May 2013
19:30 CEST

France	3–0	Chile
Bahebeck 44', 71' (pen.); Sacko 58'	Report

Stade Léo-Lagrange, Toulon
Referee: Ahmad Ibrahim (Jordan)

France	Chile

FRANCE:
GK	1	Paul Nardi
DF	2	Jordan Ikoko (yellow card) 66'
DF	3	Mouhamadou Sarr (c)
DF	4	Antoine Conte
FW	7	Jean-Christophe Bahebeck (substituted off) 71'
MF	8	Adrien Rabiot (yellow card) 80'
FW	9	Hadi Sacko (substituted off) 77'
FW	10	Lenny Nangis (substituted off) 59'
DF	12	Jordan Amavi (yellow card) 63'
MF	14	Tiémoué Bakayoko (substituted off) 76'
MF	15	Adrien Hunou
Substitutions:
MF	11	Rafidine Abdullah	(substituted on) 76'
FW	13	Sébastien Haller	(substituted on) 71'
FW	18	Gaëtan Laborde	(substituted on) 59'
FW	20	Wesley Saïd	(substituted on) 77'
Manager:
(France) Ludovic Batelli

CHILE:
GK	1	Álvaro Salazar
RB	14	Pablo Vargas
CB	5	Igor Lichnovsky
CB	8	Andrés Robles
LB	17	Luis Pavez
RM	6	Sebastián Martínez	(substituted off) 76'
MF	16	César Fuentes (c)
CM	20	Claudio Baeza	(substituted off) 63'
LM	11	Juan Delgado
SS	9	Felipe Mora	(substituted off) 56'
CF	15	Cristián Cuevas	(substituted off) 41'
Substitutions:
MF	18	Nicolás Castillo	(substituted on) 41'
FW	7	Christian Bravo	(substituted on) 56'
FW	10	Diego Rojas	(substituted on) 63'
FW	19	Fabián Carmona	(substituted on) 71'
Manager:
(Argentina) Claudio Vivas

Assistant referees:
Aquel (Jordan)
Abu-Thaher (Jordan)
Fourth official:
Kabakov (Bulgaria)

== Portugal vs Chile ==
23 May 2014
17:15 CEST

Portugal	3 – 1	Chile
L. Silva 30' (pen.); Costa 65'; Fernandes 68'	Report	Castillo 69'

Stade Perruc, Hyères
Referee: Georgi Kabakov (Bulgaria)

Portugal	Chile

Portugal:
GK	1	Bruno Varela
DF	3	Rúben Vezo
DF	4	Tobias Figueiredo
DF	5	Rafael Floro
DF	6	Fábio Cardoso (yellow card) 40'
DF	8	Leandro Silva (c) 30' (substituted off) 47'
FW	10	Iuri Medeiros (substituted off) 66'
FW	11	Hélder Costa 65'
MF	15	Bruno Fernandes 57' (substituted off) 80'
MF	17	Fábio Sturgeon (substituted off) 71'
MF	19	Claude Gonçalves
Substitutions:
MF	20	João Teixeira	(substituted on) 47'
MF	7	Ricardo Horta	(substituted on) 66'
FW	9	Carlos Fortes	(substituted on) 71' (yellow card) 78'
DF	13	Rúben Semedo	(substituted on) 80'
Manager:
(Portugal) Ilídio Vale

CHILE:
GK	1	Álvaro Salazar
DF	2	Camilo Rodríguez
DF	5	Igor Lichnovsky
DF	8	Andrés Robles
DF	17	Luis Pavez	(substituted off) 74'
MF	6	Sebastián Martínez	(substituted off) 41'
MF	16	César Fuentes	(c) (yellow card) 36'
MF	20	Claudio Baeza	(substituted off) 57'
FW	11	Juan Delgado
FW	7	Christian Bravo	(yellow card) 28' (substituted off) 57'
FW	18	Nicolás Castillo	69'
Substitutions:
MF	15	Cristián Cuevas	(substituted on) 41'
MF	9	Felipe Mora	(substituted on) 57'
MF	19	Fabián Carmona	(substituted on) 57'
MF	10	Diego Rojas	(substituted on) 63'
Manager:
(Argentina) Claudio Vivas

Assistant referees:
Sokolov (Bulgaria)
Venev (Bulgaria)
Fourth official:
Ibrahim (Jordan)

== France vs China ==
23 May 2014
19:30 CEST

France	1 – 1	China
Haller 52'	Report	Wang Xinhui 67'

Stade Perruc, Hyères
Referee: Juan Ponton (Colombia)

France	China

FRANCE:
GK	16	Mouez Hassen
DF	3	Mouhamadou Sarr (yellow card) 66'
DF	5	Mory Koné (yellow card) 56'
DF	6	Théo Pellenard
FW	7	Jean-Christophe Bahebeck (substituted off) 61'
MF	8	Adrien Rabiot (substituted off) 79'
FW	9	Hadi Sacko
MF	11	Rafidine Abdullah
FW	13	Sébastien Haller 52' (substituted off) 71'
MF	15	Adrien Hunou (c) (substituted off) 61'
DF	17	Steven Moreira (yellow card) 61'
Substitutions:
FW	18	Gaëtan Laborde	(substituted on) 61'
MF	19	Benjamin Bourigeaud	(substituted on) 61'
FW	20	Wesley Saïd	(substituted on) 71'
FW	10	Lenny Nangis	(substituted on) 79'
Manager:
(France) Ludovic Batelli

CHINA:
GK	1	Fang Jingqi
DF	3	Mi Haolun
DF	4	Yang Ting
DF	5	Wang Rui
DF	6	Wang Tong (c) (yellow card) 50'
MF	7	Xu Xin	(substituted off) 62'
MF	8	Wang Shangyuan	(substituted off) 50'
FW	9	Yang Chaosheng
MF	14	Jia Tianzi	(substituted off) 33'
DF	16	Liao Junjian
DF	17	Xie Pengfei	(substituted off) 59'
Substitutions:
MF	10	Luo Senwen	(substituted on) 33' (yellow card) 35'
DF	11	Wang Xinhui	(substituted on) 50' (goal) 67'
MF	20	Li Yuanyi	(substituted on) 59'
MF	13	Guo Sheng	(substituted on) 62' (yellow card) 75'
Manager:
(China) Fu Bo

Assistant referees:
Guzman Bonilla (Colombia)
Rivas Aranda (Colombia)
Fourth official:
Do Nascimento (Brazil)

== China vs Chile ==
25 May 2014
15:45 CEST

China	v	Chile

Stade Louis Hon, Saint-Raphaël

== France vs Mexico ==
25 May 2014
18:00 CEST

France	v	Mexico

Stade Louis Hon, Saint-Raphaël

== Chile vs Mexico ==
27 May 2014
17:15 CEST

Chile	v	Mexico

Stade de Lattre-de-Tassigny, Aubagne

== China vs Portugal ==
27 May 2014
19:30 CEST

China	v	Portugal

Stade de Lattre-de-Tassigny, Aubagne

== China vs Mexico ==
29 May 2014
17:30 CEST

China	v	Mexico

Stade Léo-Lagrange, Toulon

== France vs Portugal ==
29 May 2014
19:30 CEST

France	v	Portugal

Stade Léo-Lagrange, Toulon
