= 2014 Toulon Tournament =

Tournament details
- Host country: France
- Dates: 21 May – 1 June
- Teams: 10 (from 4 confederations)
- Venue(s): Stade de Lattre-de-Tassigny, Aubagne; Stade Parc des Sports, Avignon; Stade Perruc, Hyères; Stade Louis Hon, Saint-Raphaël; Stade Léo-Lagrange, Toulon; Stade Mayol, Toulon

Final positions
- Champions: Brazil (8th title)
- Runners-up: France
- Third place: Portugal
- Fourth place: England

Tournament statistics
- Matches played: 22
- Goals scored: 67 (3.05 per match)
- Top scorer(s): (France) Jean-Christophe Bahebeck (4 goals)
- Best player: (Brazil) Rodrigo Caio

The 2014 Toulon Tournament was the 42nd edition of the Toulon Tournament. The competition took place between 21 May and 1 June 2014 mostly in the Provence-Alpes-Côte d'Azur region of South Eastern France. Brazil successfully defended their title, beating France 5–2 in the final.

== Participants ==
- France (hosts)
- Brazil
- Chile
- China
- Colombia
- England
- Mexico
- Portugal
- Qatar
- South Korea

== Venues ==
Aubagne	Avignon	Hyères	Saint-Raphaël
Stade de Lattre-de-Tassigny	Parc des Sports	Stade Perruc	Stade Louis Hon
43°17′38.42″N 5°33′44.4″E	43°55′42″N 4°50′42″E	43°7′13″N 6°8′31″E	43°25′47″N 6°48′26″E
Capacity: 1,000	Capacity: 17,518	Capacity: 1,140	Capacity: 3,000
		N/A	N/A
2014 Toulon Tournament is located in France
2014 Toulon Tournament is located in France		Toulon	Toulon
2014 Toulon Tournament is located in France		Stade Léo-Lagrange	Stade Mayol
2014 Toulon Tournament is located in France		47°14′37″N 6°0′11″E	43°7′8.21″N 5°56′11.51″E
2014 Toulon Tournament is located in France		Capacity: 10,500	Capacity: 15,400
2014 Toulon Tournament is located in France		N/A	

== Results ==
In February 2014, the Football Association announced that the group draw had been made. The group stage takes place between May 21, 2014, and May 29, 2014. Matches were played in 40-minute halves, rather than the usual 45.

=== Group A ===
Team	Pld	W	D	L	GF	GA	GD	Pts	Qualification
France	4	3	1	0	8	2	+6	10	Qualified for finals
Portugal	4	3	0	1	10	4	+6	9	Qualified for 3rd place match
Mexico	4	1	1	2	3	6	−3	4	
China	4	0	2	2	5	9	−4	2	
Chile	4	0	2	2	6	11	−5	2	

21 May 2014
17:15 CEST

Mexico	0–2	Portugal
	Report	Teixeira 27'; Costa 73'

Stade Léo-Lagrange, Toulon
Referee: Francisco do Nascimiento (Brasil)

21 May 2014
19:30 CEST

France	3–0	Chile
Bahebeck 44', 71' (pen.); Sacko 58'	Report

Stade Léo-Lagrange, Toulon
Referee: Ahmad Ibrahim (Jordan)

23 May 2014
17:15 CEST

Portugal	3–1	Chile
L. Silva 30' (pen.); Costa 65'; Fernandes 68'	Report	Castillo 69'

Stade Perruc, Hyères
Referee: Georgi Kabakov (Bulgaria)

23 May 2014
19:30 CEST

France	1–1	China
Haller 52'	Report	Wang Xinhui 67'

Stade Perruc, Hyères
Referee: Juan Ponton (Colombia)

25 May 2014
15:45 CEST

China	3–3	Chile
Guo Yi 42'; Yang Chaosheng 58'; Xie Pengfei 78'	Report	Martínez 17', 31'; Delgado 49'

Stade Louis Hon, Saint-Raphaël
Referee: Juan Ponton (Colombia)

25 May 2014
18:00 CEST

France	2–0	Mexico
Ikoko 7'; Hunou 80+1'	Report

Stade Louis Hon, Saint-Raphaël
Referee: Francisco do Nascimiento (Brasil)

27 May 2014
17:15 CEST

Chile	2–2	Mexico
Bravo 1', 47' (pen.)	Report	Marín 22'; Treviño 62'

Stade de Lattre-de-Tassigny, Aubagne
Referee: Georgi Kabakov (Bulgaria)

27 May 2014
19:30 CEST

China	1–4	Portugal
Li Yuanyi 26'	Report	Horta 13', 39' (pen.); Semedo 35' (pen.); Costa 65'

Stade de Lattre-de-Tassigny, Aubagne
Referee: Juan Ponton (Colombia)

29 May 2014
17:30 CEST

China	0–1	Mexico
	Report	Hernández 58'

Stade Léo-Lagrange, Toulon
Referee: Jérôme Efong Nzolo (Belgium)

29 May 2014
19:30 CEST

France	2–1	Portugal
Sarr 35'; Sacko 60' (pen.)	Report	Vezo 69'

Stade Léo-Lagrange, Toulon
Referee: Georgi Kabakov (Bulgaria)

=== Group B ===
Team	Pld	W	D	L	GF	GA	GD	Pts	Qualification
Brazil	4	4	0	0	13	2	+11	12	Qualified for finals
England	4	1	2	1	6	4	+2	5	Qualified for 3rd place match
South Korea	4	1	2	1	3	4	−1	5	
Colombia	4	0	2	2	3	5	−2	2	
Qatar	4	0	2	2	2	12	−10	2	

22 May 2014
17:15 CEST

Brazil	2–0	South Korea
Thalles 27'; Luan 80+1'	Report

Stade Léo-Lagrange, Toulon
Referee: Jérôme Efong Nzolo (Belgium)

22 May 2014
19:30 CEST

England	3–0	Qatar
Obita 30'; Forster-Caskey 54'; Cousins 80+3'	Report

Stade Léo-Lagrange, Toulon
Referee: José Alfredo Peñaloza (Mexico)

24 May 2014
15:45 CEST

South Korea	1–1	Qatar
Shin Il-soo 19'	Report	Doozandeh 61' (pen.)

Stade Perruc, Hyères
Referee: Eduardo Gamboa (Chile)

24 May 2014
18:00 CEST

Brazil	2–1	Colombia
Ademilson 40' (pen.); Rodrigo Caio 58'	Report	J. Rodríguez 63'

Stade Perruc, Hyères
Referee: João Carlos Capela (Portugal)

26 May 2014
17:15 CEST

Colombia	0–1	South Korea
	Report	Moon Chang-jin 68' (pen.)

Stade Louis Hon, Saint-Raphaël
Referee: José Alfredo Peñaloza (Mexico)

26 May 2014
19:30 CEST

England	1–2	Brazil
Ward-Prowse 72'	Report	Alisson 8'; Silva 46'

Stade Louis Hon, Saint-Raphaël
Referee: Ahmad Ibrahim (Jordan)

28 May 2014
17:15 CEST

Colombia	1–1	Qatar
Borré 73'	Report	Al Saadi 48' (pen.)

Stade de Lattre-de-Tassigny, Aubagne
Referee: João Carlos Capela (Portugal)

28 May 2014
19:30 CEST

England	1–1	South Korea
Woodrow 3'	Report	Lee Chang-min 55'

Stade de Lattre-de-Tassigny, Aubagne
Referee: Eduardo Gamboa (Chile)

30 May 2014
17:15 CEST

England	1–1	Colombia
Woodrow 15'	Report	J. Rodríguez 68'

Stade Léo-Lagrange, Toulon
Referee: José Alfredo Peñaloza (Mexico)

30 May 2014
19:30 CEST

Brazil	7–0	Qatar
Wallace 9'; Luan 11', 27'; Mosquito 33'; Piazon 40+1'; Rodrigo Caio 51'; Leandro 72'	Report

Stade Léo-Lagrange, Toulon
Referee: João Carlos Capela (Portugal)

=== Third place play-off ===
1 June 2014
16:00 CEST

Portugal	1–0	England
Horta 56'	Report

Parc des Sports, Avignon
Referee: Francisco do Nascimiento (Brasil)

=== Final ===
1 June 2014
18:30 CEST

France	2–5	Brazil
Bahebeck 6' (pen.), 14'	Report	Alisson 8'; Ademilson 31' (pen.), 63' (pen.); Marquinhos 46'; Thalles 69'

Parc des Sports, Avignon
Referee: Ahmad Ibrahim (Jordan)

== Goalscorers ==
4 goals

- (France) Jean-Christophe Bahebeck

3 goals

- (Brazil) Ademilson
- (Brazil) Luan
- (Portugal) Hélder Costa
- (Portugal) Ricardo Horta

2 goals

- (Brazil) Alisson
- (Brazil) Rodrigo Caio
- (Brazil) Thalles
- (Chile) Christian Bravo
- (Chile) Sebastián Martínez
- (Colombia) Joao Rodríguez
- (France) Hadi Sacko
- (England) Cauley Woodrow

1 goal

- (Brazil) Leandro
- (Brazil) Lucas Piazon
- (Brazil) Lucas Silva
- (Brazil) Marquinhos
- (Brazil) Mosquito
- (Brazil) Wallace
- (Chile) Nicolás Castillo
- (Chile) Juan Delgado
- (China) Guo Yi
- (China) Li Yuanyi
- (China) Wang Xinhui
- (China) Xie Pengfei
- (China) Yang Chaosheng
- (Colombia) Rafael Borré
- (England) Jordan Cousins
- (England) Jake Forster-Caskey
- (England) Jordan Obita
- (England) James Ward-Prowse
- (France) Sébastien Haller
- (France) Adrien Hunou
- (France) Jordan Ikoko
- (France) Mouhamadou-Naby Sarr
- (Mexico) Daniel Hernández
- (Mexico) Hedgardo Marín
- (Mexico) Carlos Treviño
- (Portugal) Bruno Fernandes
- (Portugal) Rúben Semedo
- (Portugal) Leandro Silva
- (Portugal) Rúben Vezo
- (Portugal) João Teixeira
- (Qatar) Ahmed Al Saadi
- (Qatar) Ahmed Doozandeh
- (South Korea) Lee Chang-min
- (South Korea) Moon Chang-jin
- (South Korea) Shin Il-soo
