= Guillermo Diaz =

Guillermo Diaz may refer to:

- Guillermo Díaz-Plaja (1909–1984), Spanish literary critic, historian and poet.
- Guillermo Díaz (footballer, born 1926), Chilean footballer
- Guillermo Díaz (footballer, born 1930) (1930–1997), Chilean footballer
- Guillermo Díaz Gea (born 1944), Mexican politician
- Guillermo Díaz (wrestler) (born 1964), Mexican Olympic wrestler
- Guillermo Díaz (actor) (born 1975), American actor
- Guillermo Díaz (footballer, born 1979), Uruguayan footballer
- Guillermo Diaz (basketball) (born 1985), Puerto Rican basketball player
- Guillermo Díaz (footballer, born 1994), Chilean footballer
- Memo Diaz, (born 1995), American soccer player
