= Raúl Osorio =

Chilean footballer (born 1995)

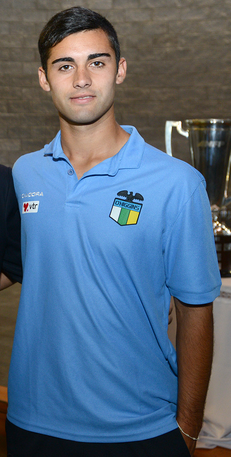
- Osorio with O'Higgins in 2013

Personal information
- Full name: Raúl Andrés Osorio Medina
- Date of birth: 29 June 1995 (age 31)
- Place of birth: Graneros, Chile
- Height: 1.80 m (5 ft 11 in)
- Position: Centre back

Team information
- Current team: San Luis
- Number: 4

Youth career
- O'Higgins

Senior career*
Years	Team	Apps	(Gls)
2012–2021	O'Higgins	105	(1)
2020–2021	→ Coquimbo Unido (loan)	28	(0)
2022	Audax Italiano	16	(0)
2023	Deportes Temuco	25	(1)
2024	Deportes La Serena	22	(0)
2025–	San Luis	0	(0)

International career^{‡}
2014	Chile U21	2	(0)
2014–2015	Chile U20	1	(0)
- * Club domestic league appearances and goals as of 26 December 2024 ‡ National team caps and goals as of 22 January 2015

Raúl Andrés Osorio Medina (born 29 June 1995) is a Chilean professional footballer who plays as a defender for San Luis de Quillota.

== Club career ==
Osorio started his career at Primera División de Chile club O'Higgins. He progressed from the under categories club all the way to the senior team.

Osorio won the Apertura 2013-14 with O'Higgins, in the 2013–14 Súper Final Apertura against Universidad Católica, being the first title for O'Higgins.

In 2014, he won the Supercopa de Chile against Deportes Iquique, in the match that O'Higgins won at the penalty shoot-out.

He participated with the club in the 2014 Copa Libertadores where they faced Deportivo Cali, Cerro Porteño and Lanús, being third and being eliminated in the group stage.

In 2024, Osorio signed with Deportes La Serena. The next season, he switched to San Luis de Quillota.

== International career ==
Osorio represented Chile U20 at friendly tournaments in 2014. The next year, he was part of the squad that played the 2015 South American U-20 Championship in Uruguay. He also was in the Chile squad for the 2014 Toulon Tournament which included U21 players.

== Honours ==
O'Higgins

- Primera División: 2013–A
- Supercopa de Chile: 2014

Deportes La Serena

- Primera B: 2024

Individual

- Medalla Santa Cruz de Triana: 2014
