= 2014–15 Club Atlas season =

Atlas
2014–15 season
- Chairman: Gustavo Guzmán Sepúlveda (December 2013-present)
- Manager: Tomás Boy (04 January 2014-present)
- Stadium: Estadio Jalisco
- Apertura 2014: 3rd Final phase quarter-finals
- Clausura 2015: 4th Final phase quarter-finals
- Copa MX (Apertura): Quarter-finals
- Copa Libertadores 2015: Group Stage
- Top goalscorer: Apertura: Arturo Gonzalez (4); Luis Nery Caballero (4); Clausura: Martín Barragan (4)
Home colours	Away colours	Third colours

The 2014–15 Atlas season was the 68th professional season of Mexico's top-flight football league. The season is split into two tournaments—the Torneo Apertura and the Torneo Clausura—each with identical formats and each contested by the same eighteen teams. Atlas began their season on July 19, 2014, against Tigres UANL, Atlas played their homes games on Saturdays at 9:00pm local time. Atlas qualified to the final phase in the Apertura tournament and was eliminated in the quarter-finals by Rayados de Monterrey. Atlas qualified to the Copa Libertadores 2015.

== Torneo Apertura ==
=== Squad ===
Note: Flags indicate national team as defined under FIFA eligibility rules; some limited exceptions apply. Players may hold more than one non-FIFA nationality.

No.	Pos.	Nation	Player
1	DF	USA	Édgar Castillo
2	DF	MEX	Enrique Pérez (on loan from Morelia)
3	GK	ARG	Federico Vilar
4	DF	MEX	Luis Venegas
5	DF	ARG	Facundo Erpen
6	DF	MEX	Jesús Chávez (on loan from Puebla)
7	DF	MEX	Óscar Razo
8	MF	COL	Aldo Leão Ramírez
9	FW	PAR	Luis Nery Caballero
10	FW	BRA	Maikon Leite
11	FW	MEX	Édson Rivera
13	FW	MEX	Jahir Barraza
14	MF	MEX	Carlos Treviño

No.	Pos.	Nation	Player
15	MF	MEX	Arturo González
16	DF	MEX	Amaury Ponce
17	MF	MEX	Rodolfo Vilchis
18	MF	MEX	Juan de Dios Hernández
19	MF	MEX	Edy Brambila (on loan from Toluca)
20	MF	CHI	Rodrigo Millar (captain)
21	GK	MEX	Alan López
22	MF	MEX	Pablo Mascareñas
23	FW	MEX	Enrique Esqueda (on loan from Pachuca)
26	MF	MEX	Juan Carlos Medina
28	FW	MEX	Martín Barragán
30	GK	MEX	Miguel Ángel Fraga
33	DF	MEX	Giovanni León

=== Regular season ===
Win Draw Loss

==== Apertura 2014 results ====
19 July 2014 round 1	Atlas	0 – 0	UANL	Guadalajara, Jalisco
				Stadium: Estadio Jalisco

25 July 2014 round 2	Morelia	0 – 2	Atlas	Morelia, Michoacan
			Enrique Esqueda 50'; Edy Brambila 90+2'	Stadium: Estadio Morelos

2 August 2014 round 3	Atlas	4 – 2	Jaguares	Guadalajara, Jalisco
	Arturo González 18'; Rodrigo Millar 42'; Luis Nery Caballero 52'; Enrique Esqueda 58'		Vicente Matías Vuoso 7'; Emiliano Daniel Armenteros 30'	Stadium: Estadio Jalisco

10 August 2014 round 4	UNAM	0 – 1	Atlas	Mexico City
			Arturo González 55'	Stadium: Estadio Olimpico Universitario

16 August 2014 round 5	Atlas	1 – 0	Leones Negros	Guadalajara, Jalisco
	Luis Nery Caballero 89' (pen.)			Stadium: Estadio Jalisco

23 August 2014 round 6	Pachuca	3 – 1	Atlas	Pachuca, Hidalgo
	Matías Alustiza 43', 49', 73' (pen.)		Arturo González 77'	Stadium: Estadio Hidalgo

30 August 2014 round 7	Atlas	1 – 1	Santos	Guadalajara, Jalisco
	Edy Brambila 60'		Javier Orozco 39'	Stadium: Estadio Jalisco

12 September 2014 round 8	Veracruz	1 – 1	Atlas	Veracruz, Veracruz
	Carlos Ochoa 18'		Luis Nery Caballero 46'	Stadium: Estadio Luis "Pirata" Fuente

20 September 2014 round 9	Atlas	2 – 1	Cruz Azul	Guadalajara, Jalisco
	Arturo González 6'; Rodrigo Millar 79'		Julio César Domínguez 54'	Stadium: Estadio Jalisco

27 September 2014 round 10	Monterrey	2 – 1	Atlas	Monterrey, Nuevo Leon
	Lucas Antonio Silva 8', 25'		Edgar Castillo 83'	Stadium: Estadio Tecnologico

30 September 2014 round 11	Atlas	2 – 1	Queretaro	Guadalajara, Jalisco
	Enrique Esqueda 31'; Edy Brambila 88'		Ronaldinho 90+3'	Stadium: Estadio Jalisco

5 October 2014 round 12	Guadalajara	0 – 1	Atlas	Zapopan, Jalisco
			Enrique Perez 24'	Stadium: Estadio Omnilife

18 October 2014 round 13	Atlas	0 – 2	Toluca	Guadalajara, Jalisco
			Antonio Ríos 47'; Isaác Brizuela 90+2'	Stadium: Estadio Jalisco

25 October 2014 round 14	Atlas	2 – 1	Puebla	Guadalajara, Jalisco
	Rodrigo Millar 43'; Martín Barragán 73'		Fredy Pajoy 18'	Stadium: Estadio Jalisco

1 November 2014 round 15	Leon	4 – 0	Atlas	Leon, Guanajuato
	Mauro Boselli 7' (pen.), 59'; Carlos Alberto Peña 50'; Alexis Rivera 64'			Stadium: Nou Camp

8 November 2014 round 16	Atlas	1 – 1	Tijuana	Guadalajara, Jalisco
	Martín Barragán 81'		Darío Benedetto 35'	Stadium: Estadio Jalisco

22 November 2014 round 17	America	1 – 2	Atlas	Mexico City
	Oribe Peralta 40'		Maikon Leite 31'; Juan Carlos Medina 68'	Stadium: Estadio Azteca

=== Final phase ===
27 November 2014 Quarter-finals	Monterrey	0 – 1	Atlas	Monterrey, Nuevo Leon
			Luis Nery Caballero 34'	Stadium: Estadio Tecnologico

30 November 2014 Quarter-finals	Atlas	0 – 2	Monterrey	Guadalajara, Jalisco
			Dorlan Pabon 31' (pen.); Candido Ramirez 69'	Stadium: Estadio Jalisco

=== Goalscorers ===
==== Regular season ====
Position	Nation	Name	Goals scored
1.	(Mexico)	Arturo González	4
2.	(Mexico)	Edy Germán Brambila	3
3.	(Chile)	Rodrigo Millar	3
4.	(Mexico)	Enrique Esqueda	3
5.	(Paraguay)	Luis Nery Caballero	3
6.	(Mexico)	Martín Barragán	2
7.	(Mexico)	Juan Carlos Medina	1
8.	(Brazil)	Maikon Leite	1
9.	(Mexico)	Enrique Perez	1
10.	(United States)	Edgar Eduardo Castillo	1
TOTAL			22

==== Final phase ====
Position	Nation	Name	Goals scored
1.	(Paraguay)	Luis Nery Caballero	1
TOTAL			1

=== Results ===
==== Results summary ====
Overall								Home						Away					
Pld	W	D	L	GF	GA	GD	Pts	W	D	L	GF	GA	GD	W	D	L	GF	GA	GD
17	9	4	4	22	20	+2	31	5	3	1	13	9	+4	4	1	3	9	11	−2

Last updated: 23 November 2014.
Source: Apertura 2014 results

=== Group stage ===
Win Draw Loss

==== Apertura results ====
30 July 2014 1	Atlas	4 – 2	Sinaloa	Guadalajara, Jalisco
	Juan Carlos Medina 6'; Aldo Leão Ramírez 32'; Jahir Barraza 48' (pen.); Martin Barragan 63'		Jesús Javier Gómez 39'; Raúl Enríquez 82' (pen.)	Stadium: Jalisco Stadium

5 August 2014 2	Sinaloa	2 – 2	Atlas	Culiacan, Sinaloa
	Christian Javier López 26', 62'		Arturo González 56'; Jahir Barraza 65'	Stadium: Estadio Banorte

19 August 2014 3	Zacatecas	1 – 2	Atlas	Zacatecas, Zacatecas
	Marco Argüelles 35'		Martin Barragan 28'; Sergio Amaury Ponce 90+3'	Stadium: Estadio Francisco Villa

27 August 2014 4	Atlas	1 – 0	Zacatecas	Guadalajara, Jalisco
	Martin Barragan 86'			Stadium: Jalisco Stadium

17 September 2014 5	Leones Negros	1 – 2	Atlas	Guadalajara, Jalisco
	Isaac Romo 10'		Edson Rivera 14'; Maikon Leite 75' (pen.)	Stadium: Jalisco Stadium

24 September 2014 6	Atlas	0 – 3	Leones Negros	Guadalajara, Jalisco
			William Ferreira 28'; Efren Mendoza 69'; Christian Lopez 77'	Stadium: Jalisco Stadium

=== Knockout stage ===
22 October 2014 Quarter-Finals	Atlas	0 – 0 (3−4 p)	Puebla	Guadalajara, Jalisco
				Stadium: Jalisco Stadium
	Penalties
	Millar (penalty missed); Esqueda (penalty scored); Vilar (penalty missed); González (penalty scored); Maikon Leite (penalty scored); Ponce (penalty missed)		(penalty missed) Pajoy; (penalty missed) Esqueda; (penalty scored) de Luna; (penalty scored) Loroña; (penalty scored) Blanco; (penalty scored) Frausto

=== Goalscorers ===
Position	Nation	Name	Goals scored
1.	(Mexico)	Martín Barragán	3
2.	(Mexico)	Jahir Barraza	2
3.	(Mexico)	Juan Carlos Medina	1
4.	(Colombia)	Aldo Leão Ramírez	1
5.	(Mexico)	Arturo González	1
6.	(Mexico)	Sergio Amaury Ponce	1
7.	(Mexico)	Edson Rivera	1
7.	(Brazil)	Maikon Leite	1
TOTAL			11

== Torneo Clausura ==
=== First-team squad ===
Note: Flags indicate national team as defined under FIFA eligibility rules; some limited exceptions apply. Players may hold more than one non-FIFA nationality.

No.	Pos.	Nation	Player
1	DF	USA	Édgar Castillo
2	DF	MEX	Enrique Pérez
3	GK	ARG	Federico Vilar
4	DF	MEX	Luis Venegas
5	DF	ARG	Walter Kannemann
6	DF	MEX	Juan Carlos Valenzuela
7	FW	BRA	Keno
8	MF	COL	Aldo Leão Ramírez
9	FW	PAR	Luis Nery Caballero
10	MF	MEX	Juan Pablo Rodríguez
11	FW	MEX	Carlos Ochoa (on loan from Santos Laguna)
13	FW	ECU	Christian Suárez (on loan from Pachuca)
14	MF	MEX	Carlos Treviño

No.	Pos.	Nation	Player
15	MF	MEX	Arturo González
17	FW	MEX	Hugo Sifuentes
18	MF	MEX	Juan de Dios Hernández
19	MF	MEX	Edy Brambila (on loan from Toluca)
20	MF	CHI	Rodrigo Millar (captain)
21	GK	MEX	Alan López
22	MF	MEX	Pablo Mascareñas
24	DF	MEX	Rodrigo Godínez
26	MF	MEX	Juan Carlos Medina
28	FW	MEX	Martín Barragán
30	GK	MEX	Miguel Ángel Fraga

=== Regular season ===
Win Draw Loss

==== Clausura 2015 results ====
10 January 2015 round 1	UANL	0 – 1	Atlas	San Nicolas de los Garza, Nuevo Leon
			Edy Brambila 79'	Stadium: Estadio Universitario

17 January 2015 round 2	Atlas	2 – 1	Morelia	Zapopan, Jalisco
	Kannemann 66'; Barragán 83'		Cejas 38'	Stadium: Estadio Tres de Marzo

24 January 2015 round 3	Jaguares	3 – 1	Atlas	Tuxtla Gutierrez, Chiapas
	Vuoso 52'; Hurtado 62', 71'		Barragán 80'	Stadium: Estadio Victor Manuel Reyna

31 January 2015 round 4	Atlas	1 – 1	UNAM	Guadalajara, Jalisco
	Barragán 27'		Alcoba 90'	Stadium: Estadio Jalisco

8 February 2015 round 5	Leones Negros	0 – 2	Atlas	Guadalajara, Jalisco
			Aldo Leao 29'; Enrique Pérez 51'	Stadium: Estadio Jalisco

14 February 2015 round 6	Atlas	1 – 3	Pachuca	Guadalajara, Jalisco
	Rodrigo Millar 65'		Germán Cano 29'; Jürgen Damm 48'; Hirving Lozano 75'	Stadium: Estadio Jalisco

20 February 2015 round 7	Santos	0 – 1	Atlas	Torreon, Coahuila
			Gonzalez 85'	Stadium: Nuevo Estadio Corona

28 February 2015 round 8	Atlas	0 – 3	Veracruz	Guadalajara, Jalisco
			Daniel Villalva 39'; Julio Furch 77', 88'	Stadium: Estadio Jalisco

7 March 2015 round 9	Cruz Azul	1 – 1	Atlas	Mexico City
	Vela 28'		Medina 74'	Stadium: Estadio Azul

14 March 2015 round 10	Atlas	2 – 1	Monterrey	Guadalajara, Jalisco
	Medina 72'; Gonzalez 88' (pen.)		Madrigal 90'	Stadium: Estadio Jalisco

21 March 2015 round 11	Queretaro	2 – 0	Atlas	Queretaro, Queretaro
	Osuna 50'; Villa 68'			Stadium: Estadio Corregidora

4 April 2015 round 12	Atlas	1 – 1	Guadalajara	Guadalajara, Jalisco
	Caballero 38'		Bravo 10'	Stadium: Estadio Jalisco

12 April 2015 round 13	Toluca	0 – 0	Atlas	Toluca, State of Mexico
				Stadium: Estadio Nemesio Diez

18 April 2015 round 14	Puebla	0 – 1	Atlas	Puebla, Puebla
			Suarez 40'	Stadium: Estadio Universitario BUAP

25 April 2015 round 15	Atlas	3 – 2	Leon	Guadalajara, Jalisco
	Caballero 14'; Rodríguez 74' (pen.); Pérez 89'		Bottinelli 4'; Navarro 20'	Stadium: Estadio Jalisco

1 May 2015 round 16	Tijuana	1 – 2	Atlas	Tijuana, Baja California
	Garza 44'		Barragán 53'; Caballero 70'	Stadium: Estadio Caliente

9 May 2015 round 17	Atlas	1 – 2	America	Guadalajara, Jalisco
	Alvarez 61'		Benedetto 63'; Aguilar 65'	Stadium: Estadio Jalisco

=== Final phase ===
14 May 2015 Quarter-finals	Guadalajara	0 – 0	Atlas	Zapopan, Jalisco
				Stadium: Estadio Omnilife

17 May 2015 Quarter-finals	Atlas	1 – 4	Guadalajara	Guadalajara, Jalisco
				Stadium: Estadio Jalisco

=== Goalscorers ===
==== Regular season ====
Position	Nation	Name	Goals scored
1.	(Mexico)	Martin Barragan	4
2.	(Paraguay)	Luis Nery Caballero	3
3.	(Mexico)	Enrique Perez	2
4.	(Mexico)	Juan Carlos Medina	2
5.	(Mexico)	Arturo Gonzalez	2
6.	(Argentina)	Walter Kannemann	1
7.	(Colombia)	Aldo Leao Ramirez	1
8.	(Mexico)	Juan Pablo Rodriguez	1
9.	(Chile)	Rodrigo Millar	1
10.	(Ecuador)	Christian Suarez	1
11.	(Mexico)	Edy Brambila	1
12.	(Mexico)	Daniel Alvarez	1
TOTAL			20

==== Final phase ====
Position	Nation	Name	Goals scored
1.	(Mexico)	Juan Carlos Medina	1
TOTAL			1

=== Results ===
==== Results summary ====
Overall								Home						Away					
Pld	W	D	L	GF	GA	GD	Pts	W	D	L	GF	GA	GD	W	D	L	GF	GA	GD
17	8	4	5	20	21	−1	28	3	2	3	11	14	−3	5	2	2	9	7	+2

Last updated: 20 May 2015.
Source: Clausura 2015 results

=== Group stage ===
Win Draw Loss

==== Copa Libertadores results ====
17 February 2015 round 1	Atlas	0 – 1	Santa Fe	Guadalajara, Jalisco
			Luis Arias 77'	Stadium: Estadio Jalisco

25 February 2015 round 2	Atletico Mineiro	0 – 1	Atlas	Belo Horizonte, Minas Gerais
			Suarez 86'	Stadium: Estádio Independência

4 March 2015 round 3	Colo Colo	2 – 0	Atlas	Santiago, Chile
	Esteban Paredes 67', 90'			Stadium: Estadio Monumental David Arellano

7 April 2015 round 4	Atlas	1 – 3	Colo Colo	Guadalajara, Jalisco
	Juan Carlos Medina 19' (pen.)		Esteban Paredes 10', 84'; Caceres 90'	Stadium: Estadio Jalisco

15 April 2015 round 5	Atlas	1 – 0	Atletico Mineiro	Guadalajara, Jalisco
	Arturo Gonzalez 39'			Stadium: Estadio Jalisco

22 April 2015 round 6	Santa Fe	3 – 1	Atlas	Bogotá, Colombia
	Omar Sebastián Pérez 20'; Daniel Roa 30'; Yamilson Rivera 90'		Walter Kannemann 61'	Stadium: Estadio El Campín

=== Goalscorers ===
Position	Nation	Name	Goals scored
1.	(Argentina)	Walter Kannemann	1
2.	(Mexico)	Arturo Gonzalez	1
3.	(Mexico)	Juan Carlos Medina	1
4.	(Ecuador)	Christian Suarez	1
TOTAL			4
