= Il-soo =

- Hangul: 일수
- RR: Ilsu
- MR: Ilsu

Il-soo or Il-su (Korean: 일수) is a Korean given name. Notable people with the name include:

- Hwang Il-su, South Korean footballer
- Shin Il-soo, South Korean footballer
- Song Il-soo (born 1950), Japanese baseball player and manager
