= 2014 Toulon Tournament Group B =

Group B of the 2014 Toulon Tournament is one of two groups competing of nations at 2014 Toulon Tournament.

== Standings ==
| Team | Pld | W | D | L | GF | GA | GD | Pts | Qualification |
|---|---|---|---|---|---|---|---|---|---|
| Brazil | 4 | 4 | 0 | 0 | 13 | 2 | +11 | 12 | Qualified for finals |
| England | 4 | 1 | 2 | 1 | 6 | 4 | +2 | 5 | Qualified for 3rd place match |
| South Korea | 4 | 1 | 2 | 1 | 3 | 4 | −1 | 5 | |
| Colombia | 4 | 0 | 2 | 2 | 3 | 5 | −2 | 2 | |
| Qatar | 4 | 0 | 2 | 2 | 2 | 12 | −10 | 2 | |

Source: Toulon Tournament
Team qualified for finals
Team qualified for 3rd place match

All Times are Central European Summer Time (CEST)

== Brazil vs South Korea ==
22 May 2014
17:15 CEST

| Brazil | 2 - 0 | South Korea |
|---|---|---|
| Thalles 27'; Luan 80+1' |

Stade Léo-Lagrange, Toulon
Referee: Jérôme Efong Nzolo (Belgium)

== England vs Qatar ==
22 May 2014
19:30 CEST

| England | v | Qatar |

Stade Léo-Lagrange, Toulon
Referee: José Alfredo Peñaloza (Mexico)

== South Korea vs Qatar ==
24 May 2014
15:45 CEST

| South Korea | v | Qatar |

Stade Perruc, Hyères
Referee: Eduardo Gamboa (Chile)

== Brazil vs Colombia ==
24 May 2014
18:00 CEST

| Brazil | v | Colombia |

Stade Perruc, Hyères
Referee: Joao Carlos Santos Capela (Portugal)

== Colombia vs South Korea ==
26 May 2014
17:15 CEST

| Colombia | v | South Korea |

Stade Louis Hon, Saint-Raphaël

== England vs Brazil ==
26 May 2014
19:30 CEST

| England | v | Brazil |

Stade Louis Hon, Saint-Raphaël

== Colombia vs Qatar ==
28 May 2014
17:15 CEST

| Colombia | v | Qatar |

Stade de Lattre-de-Tassigny, Aubagne

== England vs South Korea ==
28 May 2014
19:30 CEST

| England | v | South Korea |

Stade de Lattre-de-Tassigny, Aubagne

== England vs Colombia ==
30 May 2014
17:15 CEST

| England | v | Colombia |

Stade Léo-Lagrange, Toulon

== Brazil vs Qatar ==
30 May 2014
19:30 CEST

| Brazil | v | Qatar |

Stade Léo-Lagrange, Toulon
