= Álvaro Salazar =

Chilean footballer (born 1993)

Personal information
- Full name: Álvaro Luis Salazar Bravo
- Date of birth: 24 March 1993 (age 33)
- Place of birth: Linares, Chile
- Height: 1.85 m (6 ft 1 in)
- Position: Goalkeeper

Team information
- Current team: Deportes Recoleta

Youth career
- Colo-Colo

Senior career*
Years	Team	Apps	(Gls)
2012–2020	Colo-Colo	13	(0)
2012–2013	Colo-Colo B	24	(0)
2014–2015	→ Barnechea (loan)	10	(0)
2018–2019	→ Universidad de Concepción (loan)	2	(0)
2020–2021	Unión Española	3	(0)
2021–2022	Audax Italiano	7	(0)
2023	Barnechea	27	(0)
2024	Unión San Felipe	10	(0)
2025	Cobreloa	1	(0)
2026–	Deportes Recoleta	0	(0)

International career^{‡}
2013–2014	Chile U20	1	(0)
2014	Chile U21	2	(0)
- * Club domestic league appearances and goals as of 21 December 2025 ‡ National team caps and goals as of 27 May 2014

Álvaro Luis Salazar Bravo (born 24 March 1993) is a Chilean footballer who plays as a goalkeeper for Deportes Recoleta.

== Club career ==
He debuted in a 5–1 home win over Audax Italiano in 2012.

In 2021, he signed with Audax Italiano.

For the 2024 season, he signed with Unión San Felipe from Barnechea. The next year, he switched to Cobreloa.

In 2026, Salazar joined Deportes Recoleta.

== International career ==
He was in the Chile U20 squad for the 2013 FIFA U-20 World Cup, but he didn't make any appearance at the tournament. After, he was in the Chile squad for the 2014 Toulon Tournament which included U21 players, making two appearances.

== Honours ==
Colo-Colo

- Primera División (2): 2014 Clausura, 2017 Transición
- Copa Chile: 2016
- Supercopa de Chile: 2017
