= Luis Pavez (footballer, born 1995) =

Chilean footballer

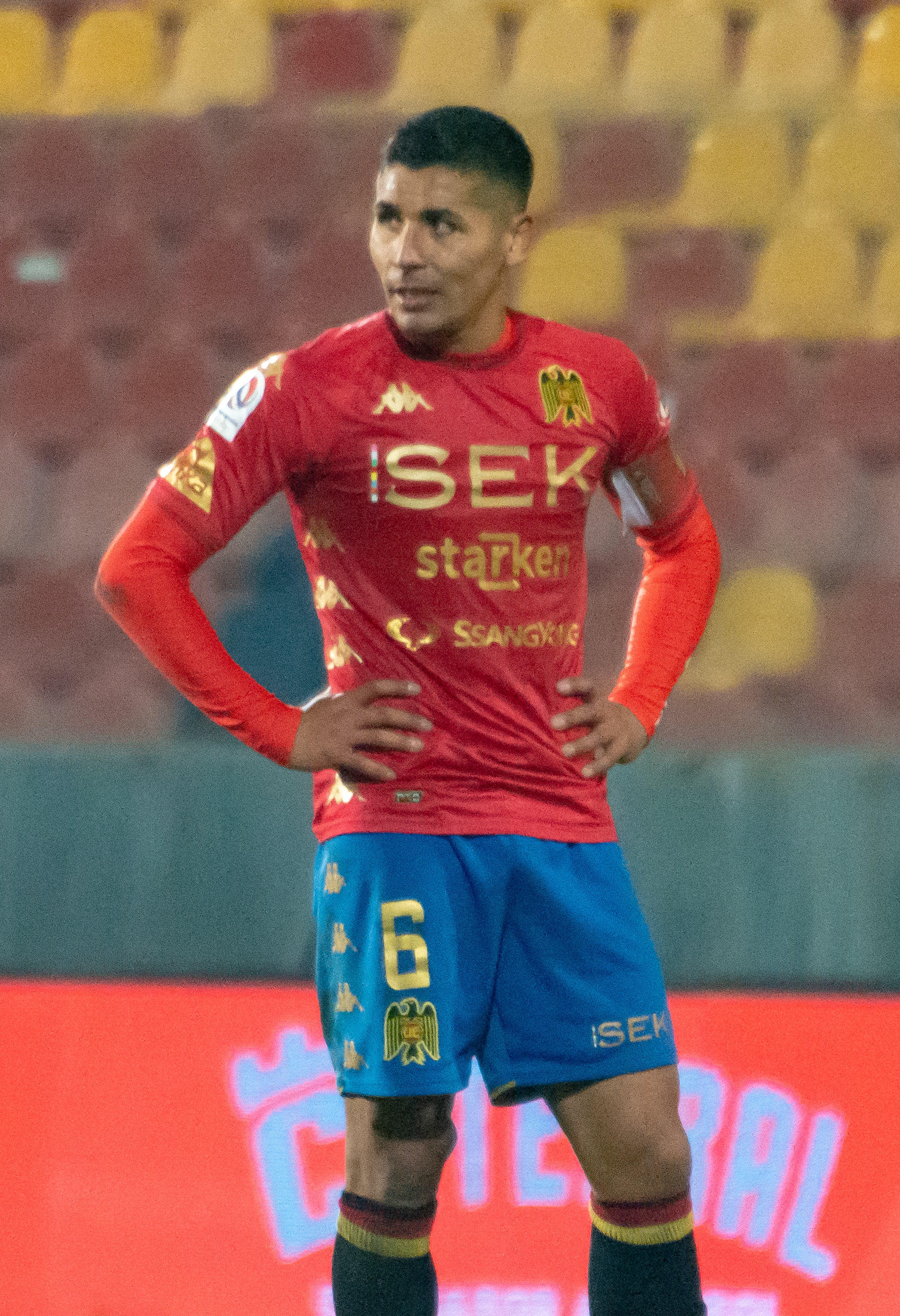
- Pavez with Unión Española in 2023

Personal information
- Full name: Luis Alberto Pavez Muñoz
- Date of birth: 17 September 1995 (age 31)
- Place of birth: Santiago, Chile
- Height: 1.75 m (5 ft 9 in)
- Position: Left back

Team information
- Current team: O'Higgins
- Number: 6

Youth career
- 2004–2012: Colo-Colo

Senior career*
Years	Team	Apps	(Gls)
2012–2013	Colo-Colo B	13	(0)
2012–2017	Colo-Colo	43	(3)
2015–2016	→ Cádiz (loan)	9	(0)
2017	→ Santiago Wanderers (loan)	28	(0)
2018–2021	Unión Española	67	(2)
2021	Juárez	17	(1)
2022–2024	Unión Española	56	(1)
2025–	O'Higgins	30	(2)

International career^{‡}
2014	Chile U21	3	(0)
2014–2015	Chile U20	3	(0)
- * Club domestic league appearances and goals as of 12 December 2024 ‡ National team caps and goals as of 22 January 2015

Luis Alberto Pavez Muñoz (born 17 September 1995) is a Chilean professional footballer who plays as a left back for O'Higgins.

== Club career ==
A product of Colo-Colo, Pavez had stints abroad with Spanish club Cádiz in 2015–2016 and the Mexican club Juárez in 2021.

Pavez signed with O'Higgins for the 2025 season.

== International career ==
In 2014, Pavez represented Chile at under-21 level in the 2014 Toulon Tournament. In the same year, he represented the under-20's in the 2014 Aspire Four Nations International Tournament in Qatar.

== Honours ==
Colo-Colo

- Primera División: 2014–C

Santiago Wanderers

- Copa Chile: 2017
