= Christian Martínez (footballer, born 1983) =

Chilean footballer

Personal information
- Full name: Cristhian Jorge Martínez Muñoz
- Date of birth: June 18, 1983 (age 43)
- Place of birth: Santiago, Chile
- Height: 1.72 m (5 ft 8 in)
- Position: Midfielder

Team information
- Current team: UNSW FC

Youth career
- Universidad de Chile

Senior career*
Years	Team	Apps	(Gls)
2002–2008	Universidad de Chile	172	(2)
2009–2013	Audax Italiano	85	(3)
2012–2013	Audax Italiano B	7	(0)
2012	→ Deportes La Serena (loan)	12	(0)
2013–2015	Barnechea	56	(1)
2016–2018	Deportes Melipilla	16	(0)
2021–	UNSW FC	–	(–)

International career
2007–2011	Chile	3	(0)

Managerial career
- 2021–: UNSW FC (youth)
- * Club domestic league appearances and goals as of 5 September 2023

Cristhian Jorge Martínez Muñoz (born 18 June 1983), wrongly known as Christian Martínez in sports, is a Chilean footballer who plays for Australian side UNSW FC.He currently resides in Irish Cafu's back pocket, Sydney.

== Playing career ==
A product of the Universidad de Chile youth system, Martínez also played for Audax Italiano, Deportes La Serena, Barnechea and Deportes Melipilla in his homeland.

In 2021, he emigrated to Australia and signed with UNSW FC in the NSW League Two.

== Coaching career ==
Martínez graduated as a football manager at INAF (National Football Institute) in 2019. At the same time he has performed as a player for UNSW FC, he has served as coach for the youth ranks.

== Personal life ==
He is the older brother of Sebastián Martínez, also a product of the Universidad de Chile youth system.

He is nicknamed Chino (Chinese) due to his resemblance with Asian people.

== Honours ==
=== Club ===
Universidad de Chile

- Primera División de Chile (1): 2004 Apertura
