= Muaaz Al-Salemi =

Qatari footballer (born 1996)

Muaaz Al Salemi
Personal information
- Full name: Muaaz Yahya Nasser Al Salemi
- Date of birth: 15 August 1996 (age 30)
- Place of birth: Qatar
- Position: Midfielder

Team information
- Current team: Al Bidda
- Number: 30

Youth career
- 2009-2014: Al-Gharafa
- 2012-2014: → Sevilla FC (loan)
- 2014: → Red Bull Salzburg (loan)

Senior career*
Years	Team	Apps	(Gls)
2014–2021	Al-Gharafa	36	(0)
2016–2017	→ Al-Wakrah (loan)	11	(0)
2021–	Al-Shamal	13	(2)
2022–2023	→ Al Ahli (loan)	5	(0)
2023	Al-Khor	4	(0)
2024–2025	Muaither	2	(0)
2026–	Al Bidda	0	(0)

International career
2014	Qatar U21	2	(0)
- * Club domestic league appearances and goals

Muaaz Al Salemi (Arabic:معاذ السالمي ) (born 15 August 1996) is a Qatari footballer who plays for Al Bidda as a midfielder.

== Club career ==
Al-Salemi began his professional career with Al-Gharafa SC in 2014. He was loan to Al-Wakrah SC in 2016 and to Al Ahli SC in 2022.

== Honours ==
=== Club ===
Al-Gharafa SC

- Qatari Stars Cup: 2017-18, 2018-19

Al-Khor SC

- Qatari Second Division: 2023-24
