= Carlos Treviño =

Mexican footballer (born 1993)

Personal information
- Full name: Carlos Alberto Treviño Luque
- Date of birth: 19 April 1993 (age 33)
- Place of birth: Monterrey, Mexico
- Height: 1.74 m (5 ft 9 in)
- Position: Midfielder

Youth career
- Académicos

Senior career*
Years	Team	Apps	(Gls)
2012–2018	Atlas	7	(0)
2015	→ Necaxa (loan)	0	(0)
2016	→ Venados (loan)	12	(1)
2017–2018	→ Lobos BUAP (loan)	9	(0)
2020–2021	UE Figueres	10	(0)

International career
2013	Mexico U20	2	(0)
2013–2014	Mexico U21	7	(1)
Medal record
Representing Mexico
First place	CONCACAF U-20 Championship	2013 Mexico
- * Club domestic league appearances and goals as of 20 February 2021

Carlos Alberto Treviño Luque (born 19 April 1993) is a Mexican professional footballer who plays as a midfielder who plays for UE Figueres.

== Early life ==
Carlos was born in Monterrey, Mexico.

== Club career ==
Treviño plays for Club Atlas in Liga MX.

He came through the Atlas youth ranks. He was on the championship team for FIFA U-17 World Cup and served as a captain for various youth teams. He made his professional debut in Primera División Apertura 2012 under the name Tomás Boy. Trevino has represented Atlas in the Copa MX (2014–15 Club Atlas season).

== International career ==
Treviño represented Mexico at the 2013 FIFA U-20 World Cup. He also participated in two Toulon Tournaments, the 2013 and 2014 playing in five games.

== Honours ==
Mexico U20

- CONCACAF Under-20 Championship: 2013
