= Pablo Mascareñas =

Mexican footballer (born 1989)

Personal information
- Full name: Pablo Jesús Mascareñas Avendaño
- Date of birth: 4 August 1989 (age 37)
- Place of birth: Ciudad Madero, Mexico
- Height: 1.71 m (5 ft 7 in)
- Position: Defensive midfielder

Senior career*
Years	Team	Apps	(Gls)
2008	Ciudad Madero		
2009–2014	Altamira	63	(3)
2013	→ Tampico Madero (loan)		
2014–2016	Atlas	8	(0)
2016	Oaxaca	0	(0)
- * Club domestic league appearances and goals

Pablo Jesús Mascareñas Avendaño (born 4 August 1989) is a Mexican former professional footballer who played as midfielder.

== Career ==
=== Altamira ===
Mascareñas was born in Ciudad Madero, Tamaulipas. He made his professional debut with Altamira in the Ascenso MX in 2010. He appeared with the team in Liga MX and in the Copa MX. His best season came in 2011–12, scoring two goals in two games for the team.

=== Ciudad Madeiro ===
Mascareñas had the best season of his career on loan with the third division team in the 2012–13 season, scoring 13 goals in 17 games.

=== Atlas ===
Mascareñas signed with Atlas on 14 July, making appearances for the team in the Copa MX during the 2014–15 season.

=== Alebrijes de Oaxaca ===
Mascareñas signed for Oaxaca for the Clausura 2016 in the Ascenso MX. Oaxaca finished in 3rd place in the Apertura 2015 and were eliminated by future runner up Atlante F.C. 4–3 on aggregate.
