= Sebastián Ayala =

Colombian footballer (born 1995)

Personal information
- Full name: Jhoan Sebastián Ayala Sanabria
- Date of birth: 14 September 1995 (age 31)
- Place of birth: Floridablanca, Colombia
- Height: 1.78 m (5 ft 10 in)
- Position: Midfielder

Team information
- Current team: Atlético Huila
- Number: 29

Youth career
- La Equidad

Senior career*
Years	Team	Apps	(Gls)
2013–2017	La Equidad	41	(0)
2014	→ Nacional (loan)	6	(0)
2017–2018	Millonarios	5	(0)
2019–2021	Jaguares	32	(0)
2021	Deportivo Pasto	5	(0)
2022	Deportes Quindío	38	(2)
2024	Patriotas Boyacá	43	(3)
2024–2025	Comunicaciones	5	(1)
- * Club domestic league appearances and goals

Jhoan Sebastián Ayala Sanabria (born 14 September 1995) is a Colombian professional footballer who plays as a midfielder for Categoría Primera B club Atlético Huila.

== Career statistics ==
Appearances and goals by club, season and competition
Club	Season	League		Cup		Continental		Total	
Club	Season	Apps	Goals	Apps	Goals	Apps	Goals	Apps	Goals
La Equidad	2013	7	0	2	0	—		9	0
La Equidad	2014	12	0	4	0	—		16	0
La Equidad	Total	19	0	6	0	0	0	25	0
Nacional	2014-15	6	0	0	0	1	0	7	0
La Equidad	2015	12	0	1	0	—		13	0
La Equidad	2016	10	0	3	0	—		13	0
La Equidad	2017	0	0	0	0	—		0	0
La Equidad	Total	22	0	4	0	0	0	26	0
Millonarios	2017	4	0	0	0	—		4	0
Millonarios	2018	1	0	0	0	—		1	0
Millonarios	Total	5	0	0	0	0	0	5	0
Deportivo Pasto	2021	5	0	0	0	0	0	5	0
Career total		57	0	10	0	1	0	68	0

== Honours ==
Millonarios

- Categoría Primera A: 2017–II
- Superliga Colombiana: 2018
