= Camilo Rodríguez =

Chilean footballer (born 1995)

Personal information
- Full name: Camilo Bryan Rodríguez Pedraza
- Date of birth: 4 March 1995 (age 31)
- Place of birth: Santiago, Chile
- Height: 1.66 m (5 ft 5 in)
- Position: Right-back

Team information
- Current team: Deportes Recoleta

Youth career
- Colo-Colo

Senior career*
Years	Team	Apps	(Gls)
2012–2013	Colo-Colo B	27	(0)
2012–2017	Colo-Colo	26	(0)
2016–2017	→ Everton (loan)	21	(0)
2017–2021	Everton	90	(1)
2022	Deportes Antofagasta	8	(0)
2023	Deportes La Serena	27	(0)
2024	Universidad de Concepción	26	(0)
2025	Rangers	18	(0)
2026–	Deportes Recoleta	0	(0)

International career^{‡}
2014	Chile U21	3	(0)
2014–2015	Chile U20	10	(0)
- * Club domestic league appearances and goals as of 27 January 2026 ‡ National team caps and goals as of 19 August 2014

Camilo Bryan Rodríguez Pedraza (born 4 March 1995) is a Chilean professional footballer who plays as a right-back for Deportes Recoleta.

== Club career ==
Rodríguez is a product of Colo-Colo.

In 2024, Rodríguez signed with Universidad de Concepción from Deportes La Serena. He switched to Rangers de Talca the next season.

== International career ==
In 2014, Rodríguez represented Chile U20 at two Four Nations International Tournaments in Qatar and Chile.

== Honours ==
Colo-Colo

- Torneo Clausura (1): 2014
