= Christian Bravo (footballer, born 1993) =

Chilean footballer (born 1993)

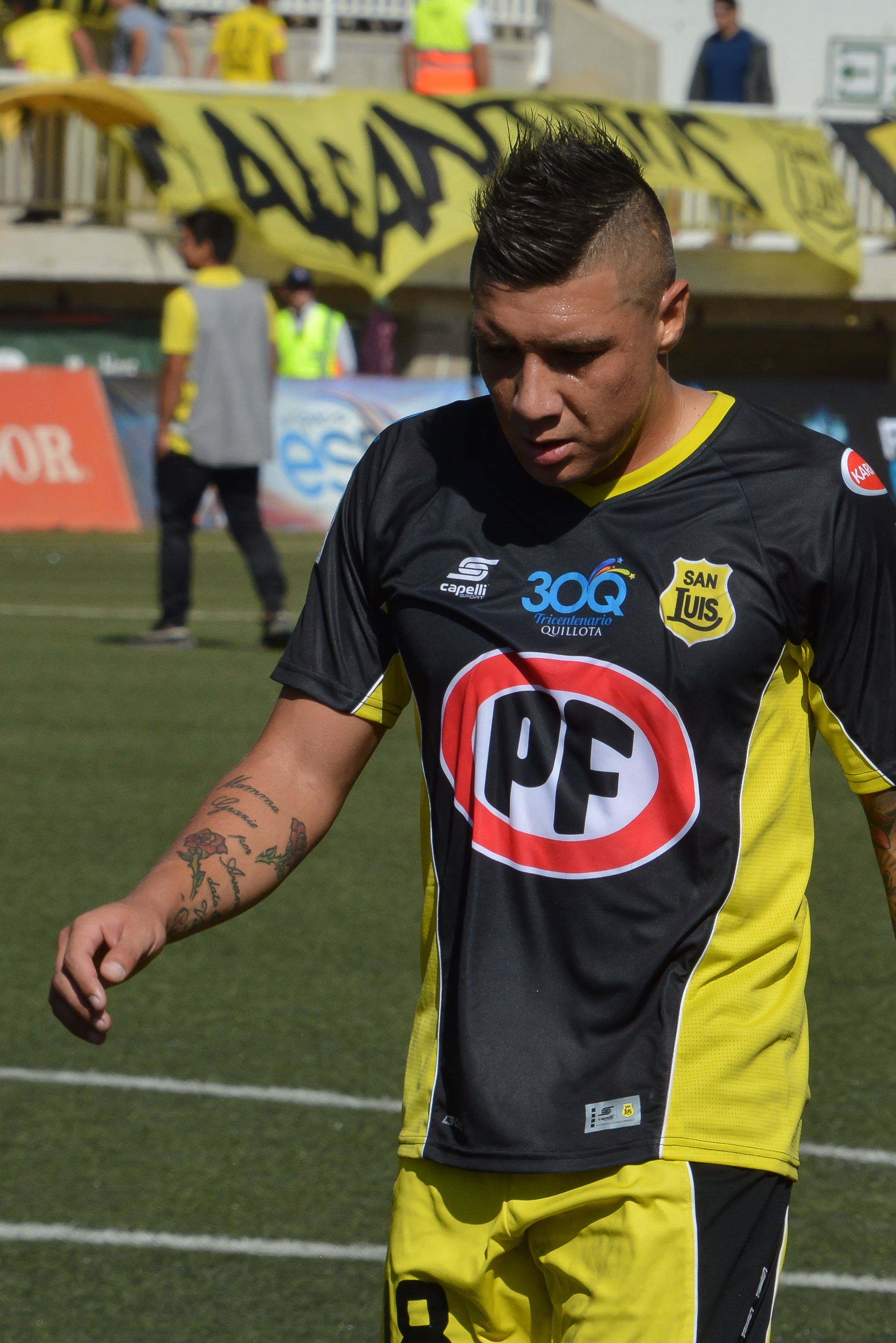

Personal information
- Full name: Christian Daniel Bravo Araneda
- Date of birth: 1 October 1993 (age 33)
- Place of birth: Iquique, Chile
- Height: 1.70 m (5 ft 7 in)
- Position: Winger

Team information
- Current team: Deportes Antofagasta

Youth career
- 2002–2012: Universidad de Chile

Senior career*
Years	Team	Apps	(Gls)
2010–2013	Universidad de Chile	10	(0)
2013–2014	Inter Zaprešić	0	(0)
2013–2014	→ Granada B (loan)	22	(3)
2014–2015	Granada B	36	(9)
2014–2017	Granada	2	(0)
2015–2017	→ Universidad Católica (loan)	36	(5)
2017	Unión Española	9	(0)
2018	San Luis	27	(1)
2019	Montevideo Wanderers	30	(6)
2020	Peñarol	10	(0)
2021	Everton	15	(1)
2022	Montevideo Wanderers	31	(2)
2023	Barnechea	29	(7)
2024	Cobreloa	22	(1)
2025–	Deportes Antofagasta	0	(0)

International career^{‡}
2013	Chile U20	5	(1)
2014	Chile U21	4	(2)
2019–	Chile	2	(0)
- * Club domestic league appearances and goals as of 16 January 2025 ‡ National team caps and goals as of 15 October 2019

Christian Daniel Bravo Araneda (born 1 October 1993) is a Chilean professional footballer who plays as a winger for Deportes Antofagasta.

== Club career ==
Born in Iquique, Bravo graduated from Universidad de Chile, and made his debut on 15 May 2010 in a match against Lota Schwager, in tha year's Copa Chile. He made his league debut on 27 November of the following year, starting in a 1–1 away draw against Audax Italiano.

Bravo only appeared sparingly for La U in the following years, and in January 2013 moved to NK Inter Zaprešić as a free agent. On 26 July 2013 he joined Granada CF, being assigned to the reserves in Segunda División B.

Bravo made his debut with the Andalusians' main squad on 12 April 2014, replacing Yacine Brahimi in a 1–0 La Liga home win against FC Barcelona.

In 2024, Bravo signed with Cobreloa. The next year, he switched to Deportes Antofagasta.

== International career ==
He made his Chile national football team debut on 10 September 2019 in a friendly against Honduras. He substituted César Pinares in the 80th minute.

== Personal life ==
He is son of Chilean former international footballer Christian Bravo Franke.

He is nicknamed Plancha (Plate/Printed image).

== Career statistics ==
=== Club ===
As of 15 January 2025

Club	Season	League			Cup		Continental		Total	
Club	Season	Division	Apps	Goals	Apps	Goals	Apps	Goals	Apps	Goals
Universidad de Chile	2011	Chilean Primera División	2	0	0	0	—		2	0
Universidad de Chile	2012	Chilean Primera División	8	0	2	0	1 (Note: Appearance(s) in Recopa Sudamericana)	0	11	0
Universidad de Chile	Total		10	0	2	0	1	0	13	0
Inter Zaprešić	2013-14	2. HNL	—		—		—		—	
Granada B (loan)	2013-14	Segunda División B	22	3	—		—		22	3
Granada B	2014-15	Segunda División B	36	9	—		—		36	9
Granada B	Total		58	12	—		—		58	12
Granada	2013-14	La Liga	2	0	—		—		2	0
Universidad Católica (loan)	2015-16	Chilean Primera División	28	5	7	0	3 (Note: Appearance(s) in Copa Sudamericana)	0	38	5
Universidad Católica (loan)	2016-17	Chilean Primera División	8	0	3	0	2 (Note: One appearance in Copa Libertadores, One appearance in Copa Sudamericana)	0	13	0
Universidad Católica (loan)	Total		36	5	10	0	5	0	51	5
Unión Española	2017	Chilean Primera División	9	0	2	0	—		11	0
San Luis	2018	Chilean Primera División	27	1	2	0	—		29	1
Montevideo Wanderers	2019	Uruguayan Primera División	30	6	—		6	2	36	8
Peñarol	2020	Uruguayan Primera División	10	0	—		4 (Note: Two appearances in Copa Libertadores, Two appearances in Copa Sudamiericana)	0	14	0
Everton	2021	Chilean Primera División	27	2	9	1	—		36	3
Montevideo Wanderers	2022	Uruguayan Primera División	31	2	—		5	1	36	3
Barnechea	2023	Primera B de Chile	29	7	2	0	—		31	7
Cobreloa	2024	Chilean Primera División	22	1	5	1	—		27	2
Career Total			295	37	32	2	21	3	326	41

== Honours ==
Universidad de Chile

- Primera División (3): 2011 Apertura, 2011 Clausura, 2012 Apertura
- Copa Sudamericana (1): 2011

Universidad Católica

- Primera División (2): 2016 Clausura, 2016 Apertura
- Supercopa de Chile (1): 2016
