= Jean-Christophe Bahebeck =

French footballer (born 1993)

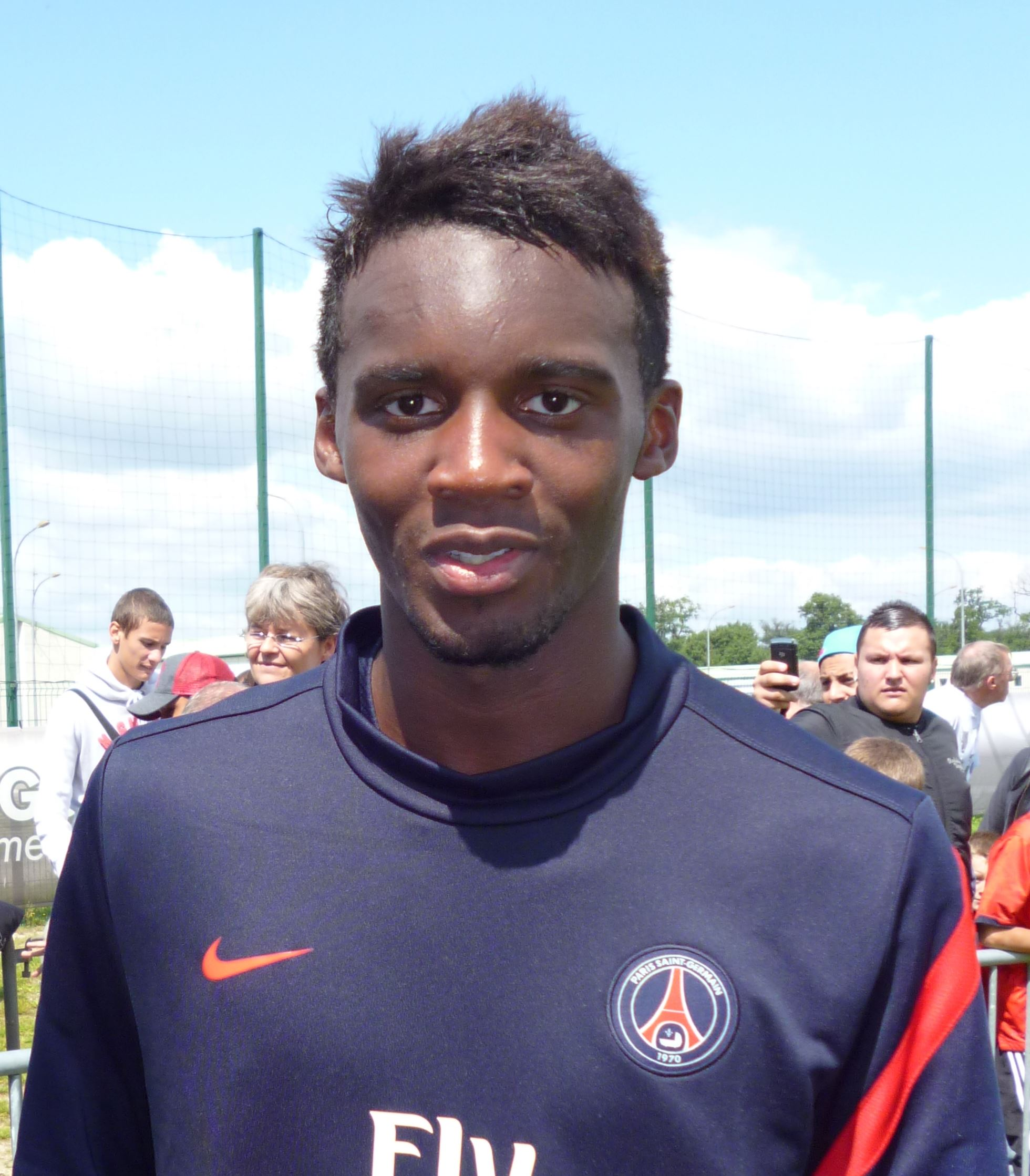
- Bahebeck in 2011

Personal information
- Full name: Jean-Christophe Bahebeck
- Date of birth: 1 May 1993 (age 33)
- Place of birth: Saint-Denis, France
- Height: 1.82 m (6 ft 0 in)
- Position: Forward

Youth career
- 2000–2003: CSM Persan
- 2003–2007: US Persan
- 2007–2011: Paris Saint-Germain

Senior career*
Years	Team	Apps	(Gls)
2010–2012	Paris Saint-Germain B	27	(13)
2011–2018	Paris Saint-Germain	34	(2)
2012–2013	→ Troyes (loan)	27	(3)
2013–2014	→ Valenciennes (loan)	19	(2)
2015–2016	→ Saint-Étienne (loan)	16	(1)
2016–2017	→ Pescara (loan)	15	(4)
2017–2018	→ Utrecht (loan)	6	(3)
2018–2020	Utrecht	29	(8)
2020–2021	Partizan	7	(1)
2022–2023	Palmaflor	15	(2)

International career^{‡}
2009	France U16	2	(0)
2010–2011	France U18	6	(3)
2011–2012	France U19	12	(5)
2012–2014	France U20	16	(8)
2013–2014	France U21	7	(0)
- * Club domestic league appearances and goals as of 20 March 2021 ‡ National team caps and goals as of 13 November 2014

Jean-Christophe Bahebeck (born 1 May 1993) is a former French professional footballer who plays as a forward. Known for his speed and shot power, Bahebeck first gained prominence at Paris Saint-Germain and the French youth national teams. Many loans followed until 2018, when he briefly settled into Utrecht's ranks before ending his career in Bolivia.

== Club career ==
=== Early career ===
Born in the commune of Saint-Denis in the Île-de-France region, Bahebeck began his football career in September 2000 at the age of seven, spending three years at local club CSM Persan in the Val d'Oise commune of Persan before moving to Union Sportive de Persan in October 2003. While training in Persan, Bahebeck was supervised by club coach Denis Diaz.

In 2006, Bahebeck was spotted by Paris Saint-Germain officials, who offered him a trial. While attending the club's detection camp, he participated in a local tournament held in Sens composed of professional teams and scored "four or five goals" there. Despite this performance, Bahebeck did not secure a future deal as it was suggested by his club coaches that he remain in Persan to be with his family and his team for at least one more year. He was later enticed by both Marseille and Bordeaux, but stayed focused on joining PSG.

=== Paris Saint-Germain ===
Paris Saint-Germain's Camp des Loges academy finally welcomed Bahebeck in 2007. He was placed on the club's under-14 team and immediately developed a reputation of a serial goalscorer.

==== 2010–11 season ====
Ahead of the 2010–11 season, Bahebeck was promoted to the club's reserve team in the Championnat de France amateur, the fourth level of French football. He was also placed onto the club's squad for the UEFA Europa League being assigned the number 37 shirt by manager Antoine Kombouaré. Bahebeck made his amateur debut on 8 August 2010 in a 1–0 victory over Bourg-Péronnas. The following week, he scored his first goal with the team in a 4–1 win over Monts d'Or Azergues. On the next match day, Bahebeck scored the team's lone goal in a 3–1 defeat to Villefranche. From October to January, he scored five goals in seven appearances, which included both goals in a 2–1 victory over the reserve team of Nancy and the game-winning goal in a win over Jura Sud. As a result of his performances during the campaign, Bahebeck was linked with moves to English clubs Manchester City and Chelsea who sought to acquire the player on a free transfer as he did not have a professional contract at the time.

For his performances with the reserve team, Bahebeck was also rewarded with a call up to the club's senior team by Kombouaré and trained with the team during the winter break in Morocco. Following the conclusion of the winter break, he was sent back down to the reserve team. In late January 2011, Bahebeck returned to the senior team and appeared on the bench in league match against Arles-Avignon. After appearing in the reserve team's 2–0 return victory over Villefranche, he was called back to the senior team. Bahebeck trained with the team ahead of its Coupe de France quarter-final tie against Le Mans on 2 March 2011. He made his professional debut in the match appearing as a substitute late in the second half. The match eventually went into extra time drawn at 0–0 and, in the 108th minute, Bahebeck scored the game-winning goal in a 2–0 victory. Following the season, on 23 June 2011, Bahebeck signed his first professional contract agreeing to a three-year deal with Paris Saint-Germain.

==== 2011–12 season ====
As a result of his professional contract and performance the previous season, Bahebeck was promoted to the senior team permanently and made his season debut on 6 August 2011 in the team's opening 1–0 league defeat to Lorient. On 18 August, he made his European debut in the team's first leg UEFA Europa League playoff round tie against Luxembourger club Differdange. In the match, Bahebeck scored his first goal of the season netting the team's second in a 4–0 away win.

==== Troyes (loan) ====
On 3 August 2012, Bahebeck moved on loan to newly promoted Ligue 1 side Troyes for the 2012–13 season. He chose his jersey numbers 19, the same number as his age.

==== Valenciennes (loan) ====
On 21 June 2013, Bahebeck moved on loan to Ligue 1 side Valenciennes for the 2013–14 season.

==== Saint-Étienne (loan) ====
On 11 August 2015, Bahebeck was loaned to Saint-Étienne for the 2015–16 season.

==== Pescara (loan) ====
On 22 August 2016, Bahebeck moved abroad for the first time in his senior career; joining newly promoted Serie A side Pescara on a season-long loan for the 2016–17 season.

=== Utrecht ===
On 12 August 2017, Bahebeck was sent on a season-long loan to Eredivisie club FC Utrecht. On 31 August 2018, the last day of the 2018 summer transfer window, he joined the club on a permanent basis. He signed a two-year contract until 2020 with option an of two further years.

== International career ==
Bahebeck was a French youth international having earned caps at under-16 and under-18 level. With the under-16 team, he only made two appearances, which came in the team's double friendly match against the Republic of Ireland in March 2009. Bahebeck failed to earn any caps at under-17 level under coach Guy Ferrier. Following the replacement of Ferrier with former assistant senior national team coach Pierre Mankowski for the 2010–11 season, he was called up to the under-18 team to participate in the 2010 edition of the Tournoi de Limoges to serve as a replacement of Yaya Sanogo who skipped the level. In the team's first match against Greece, Bahebeck scored two goals in a 4–1 victory. In the team's next group stage match against Russia, he scored the opening goal in a 2–0 rout.

He was also eligible to play for Cameroon.

== Honours ==
=== Club ===
Paris Saint-Germain

- Ligue 1: 2014–15
- Coupe de France: 2014–15
- Coupe de la Ligue: 2014–15
- Trophée des Champions: 2014, 2015

=== International ===
France U20

- FIFA U-20 World Cup: 2013

France U21

- Toulon Tournament runner-up: 2014
