= Daniel Hernández (footballer, born 1994) =

Mexican footballer

Personal information
- Full name: Daniel Hernández Trejo
- Date of birth: 16 February 1994 (age 32)
- Place of birth: San Juan del Río, Mexico
- Height: 1.76 m (5 ft 9 in)
- Position: Midfielder

Senior career*
| Years | Team | Apps | (Gls) |
| 2014–2018 | Atlas | 3 | (0) |
| 2015 | → Atlante (loan) | 2 | (0) |
| 2016–2017 | → Dorados (loan) | 11 | (2) |
| 2017–2018 | → Atlante (loan) | 8 | (0) |
| 2019 | Potros UAEM | 8 | (0) |
| 2019 | Loros | 5 | (0) |
| 2020 | Jaguares de Jalisco | 0 | (0) |

International career
- Mexico U17
Medal record
Representing Mexico
| First place | FIFA U-17 World Cup | 2011 Mexico |
- * Club domestic league appearances and goals as of 21 July 2019

Daniel Hernández Trejo (born 16 February 1994) is a former Mexican professional footballer who last played for Loros UdeC.

== Honours ==
Mexico U17

- FIFA U-17 World Cup: 2011

Mexico U20

- Central American and Caribbean Games: 2014
