= Guillermo Díaz (footballer, born 1994) =

Chilean footballer

Personal information
- Full name: Guillermo Antonio Díaz Ayala
- Date of birth: 16 May 1994 (age 32)
- Place of birth: Temuco, Chile
- Height: 1.69 m (5 ft 7 in)
- Position: Left-back

Youth career
- Unión Temuco

Senior career*
| Years | Team | Apps | (Gls) |
| 2013–2014 | Unión Temuco | 3 | (0) |
| 2013–2014 | → Universidad de Chile (loan) | 3 | (0) |
| 2014–2017 | Universidad de Chile | 0 | (0) |
| 2015 | → Deportes Temuco (loan) | 10 | (0) |
| 2015–2016 | → San Luis (loan) | 5 | (0) |
| 2016–2017 | → Rangers (loan) | 32 | (1) |
| 2018–2019 | Deportes Temuco | 20 | (2) |
| 2020–2021 | Deportes Valdivia | 8 | (0) |
| 2021 | Deportes Puerto Montt | 7 | (0) |
- * Club domestic league appearances and goals as of 26 September 2022

Guillermo Antonio Díaz Ayala (born 16 May 1994) is a Chilean footballer who last played for Deportes Puerto Montt as a left-back.

== Career ==
After suffering an injury shortly after his arrival to Universidad de Chile, Díaz debuted for la U in a match against Deportes Iquique for the 2014 Torneo Clausura.
