= Stade Perruc =

Stadium in Hyères, France

Coordinates: 43°7′13″N 6°8′31″E

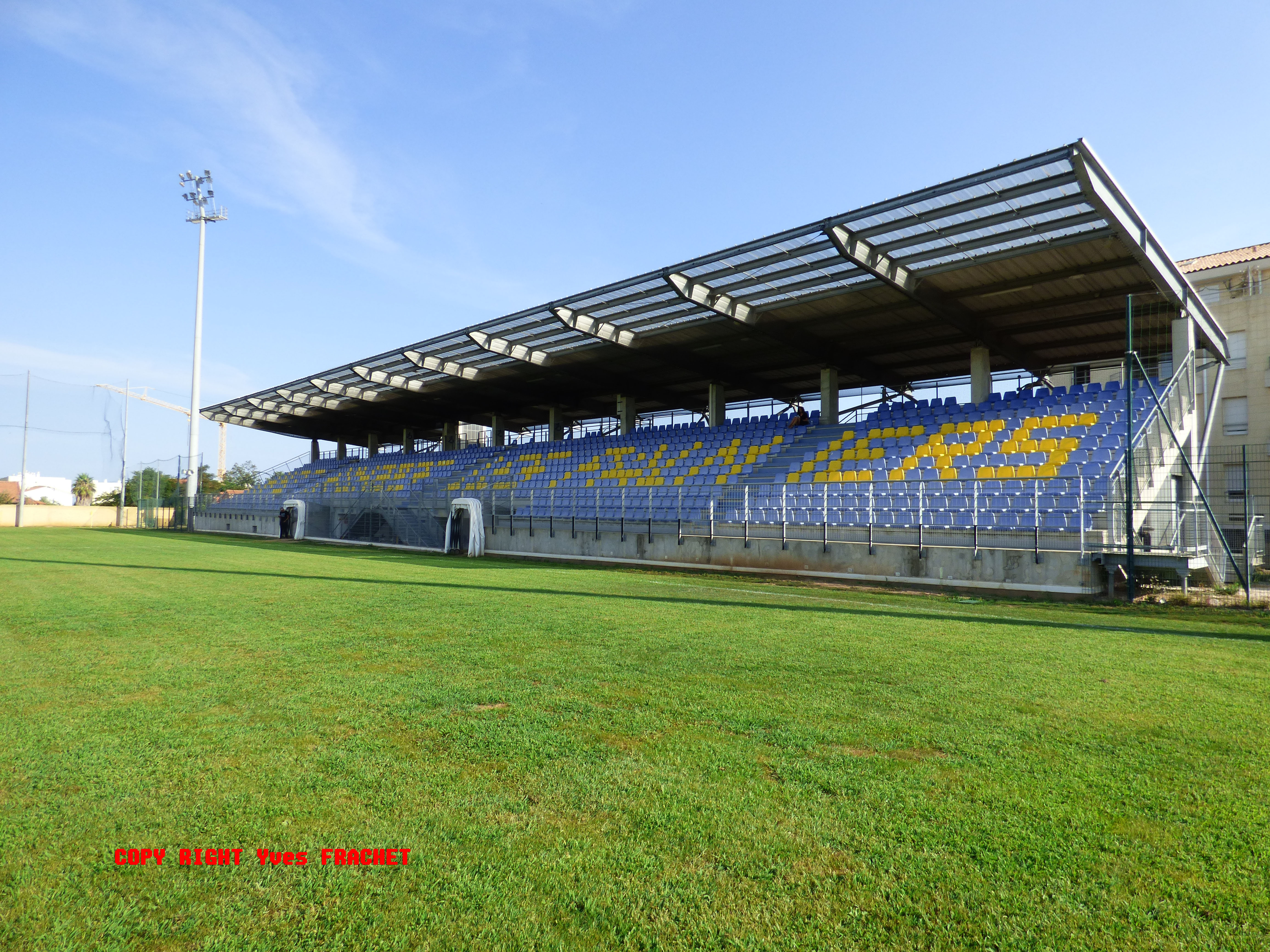
- Location: Hyères, France
- Capacity: 1,410
- Surface: Grass

Tenants
- Hyères FC (1928–present)

The Stade Perruc is a stadium in Hyères, France. It is currently used mostly for football matches and is the home stadium of Hyères FC. It hosted the club's matches in the 1932–33 Division 1, the first professional football season in France. The stadium has a capacity of 1,760.
