= Shin Il-soo =

South Korean footballer

Personal information
- Full name: Shin Il-soo
- Date of birth: 4 September 1994 (age 32)
- Place of birth: South Korea
- Height: 1.88 m (6 ft 2 in)
- Position: Midfielder

Team information
- Current team: Siheung Citizen
- Number: 5

Youth career
- 2013–2014: Korea University

Senior career*
Years	Team	Apps	(Gls)
2015–2017	Seoul E-Land	34	(0)
2017	Varzim	0	(0)
2018–2022	Ansan Greeners	44	(1)
2020	→ Paju Citizen (loan)	16	(0)
2021	→ Namdong (loan)	12	(0)
2023–2024	Jeonnam Dragons	10	(0)
2025–2026	Southern	10	(2)
2026–	Siheung Citizen	1	(0)

International career
2009–2010	South Korea U17	9	(1)
2014	South Korea U23	6	(1)
- * Club domestic league appearances and goals as of 19 March 2026

Shin Il-soo (Korean: 신일수; born 4 September 1994) is a South Korean professional footballer who plays as midfielder for K3 League club Siheung Citizen.

== Career ==
Shin was selected by Seoul E-Land in 2015 K League draft.

On 23 August 2017, Shin signed with LigaPro club Varzim.

On 19 September 2025, Shin joined Hong Kong Premier League club Southern.
