= Sebastián Martínez (footballer, born 1993) =

Chilean footballer (born 1993)

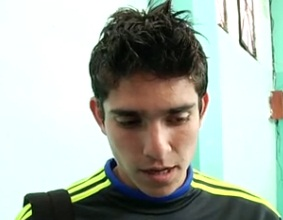
- Martínez with Universidad de Chile in 2012

Personal information
- Full name: Sebastián Ignacio Martínez Muñoz
- Date of birth: June 6, 1993 (age 33)
- Place of birth: Santiago, Chile
- Height: 1.75 m (5 ft 9 in)
- Position: Defensive midfielder

Team information
- Current team: Deportes Concepción
- Number: 14

Youth career
- Universidad de Chile

Senior career*
Years	Team	Apps	(Gls)
2011–2018	Universidad de Chile	117	(2)
2017–2018	→ Huachipato (loan)	20	(0)
2018–2021	Huachipato	45	(0)
2021	→ Palestino (loan)	4	(0)
2022	Barnechea	26	(0)
2023	Santiago Wanderers	11	(0)
2024	Universidad de Concepción	6	(0)
2024–	Deportes Concepción	14	(1)

International career^{‡}
2013	Chile U20	12	(0)
2014	Chile	1	(0)
- * Club domestic league appearances and goals as of 29 April 2025 ‡ National team caps and goals as of 31 January 2022

Sebastián Ignacio Martínez Muñoz (born 6 June 1993) is a Chilean footballer who plays as a midfielder for Deportes Concepción.

== Career ==
He debuted on 22 October 2011, in a 1–1 draw of Universidad de Chile against Palestino for the 2011 Torneo Clausura, replacing Gabriel Vargas in the halftime.

In January 2024, Martínez signed with Universidad de Concepción from Santiago Wanderers. In the second half of the same year, he switched to Deportes Concepción.

== Personal life ==
He is the younger brother of Christian Martínez, also a product of the Universidad de Chile youth system.
