= 2012–13 Club Tijuana season =

Club Tijuana
2012–13 season
- Chairman: Jorge Alberto Hank
- Manager: Antonio Mohamed
- Stadium: Estadio Caliente
- Apertura 2012: 2nd Winners
- Clausura 2013: 10th
- Copa MX (Apertura): Quarter-finals
- Copa Libertadores: Quarter-finals
- Top goalscorer: League: Apertura: Duvier Riascos (10); Clausura: Duvier Riascos (5); All: Duvier Riascos (18)
- Highest home attendance: Apertura: 22,333 vs Atlas (September 22, 2012) vs Toluca (October 22, 2012) vs Cruz Azul (October 21, 2012) vs Monterrey (November 18, 2012) vs León (November 25, 2012) vs Toluca (November 29, 2012); Clausura: 23,173 vs Guadalajara (May 3, 2013)
- Lowest home attendance: Apertura: 21,733 vs UANL (August 17, 2012); Clausura: 22,233 vs León (January 12, 2013)
Home colours	Away colours

The 2012–13 Tijuana season was the 66th professional season of Mexico's top-flight football league. The season is split into two tournaments—the Torneo Apertura and the Torneo Clausura—each with identical formats and each contested by the same eighteen teams. Tijuana began their season on July 20, 2012 against Puebla, Tijuana played most of their homes games on Fridays at 5:30pm local time in the Apertura season and at 5PM local time in the Clausura season. On December 2, 2012, Tijuana defeated Toluca 2–0 (4–1 on aggregate) to win their first Liga MX title. Tijuana did not qualify to the final phase in the Clausura tournament and were eliminated by Atlético Mineiro in the quarter-finals of the Copa Libertadores.

== Torneo Apertura ==
=== Squad ===
Note: Flags indicate national team as defined under FIFA eligibility rules; some limited exceptions apply. Players may hold more than one non-FIFA nationality.

No.	Pos.	Nation	Player
2	DF	USA	Édgar Castillo
3	DF	ARG	Javier Gandolfi (Captain)
4	DF	MEX	Miguel Almazán (on loan from Toluca)
5	DF	MEX	Joshua Abrego
6	DF	PAR	Pablo Aguilar (on loan from San Luis)
7	MF	MEX	Leandro Augusto
8	MF	MEX	Fernando Arce (vice-captain)
9	FW	ARG	Alfredo Moreno (on loan from San Luis)
10	FW	MEX	Raúl Enríquez
11	MF	ECU	Fidel Martínez
12	GK	MEX	Sergio Vega
13	GK	MEX	Cirilo Saucedo
14	DF	MEX	Alfredo González Tahuilán (on loan from UANL)
15	MF	USA	Joe Corona

No.	Pos.	Nation	Player
16	MF	ARG	Cristian Pellerano
17	MF	MEX	Jorge Hernández (on loan from Atlante)
18	MF	MEX	Luis Ángel García (on loan from UANL)
19	GK	MEX	Adrián Zermeño
20	FW	COL	Duvier Riascos
21	DF	MEX	Juan Pablo Santiago
22	DF	MEX	Juan Carlos Núñez
23	MF	MEX	Richard Ruíz
24	DF	USA	Greg Garza
26	FW	ARG	Diego Olsina
27	MF	MEX	José Madueña
29	FW	MEX	Raúl Nava (on loan from Toluca)
30	GK	MEX	Jesús Miguel García (on loan from Dorados)

=== Regular season ===
Win Draw Loss

==== Apertura 2012 results ====
July 20, 2012 Round 1	Tijuana	2 – 0	Puebla	Tijuana, Baja California
19:30	Arce 11'; Martínez (yellow card) 62'; Aguilar 70'; Gandolfi (yellow card) 81'	Report	Gastélum (yellow card) 10'; Durán (yellow card) 73'; Miranda (yellow card) 75'; Álvarez (yellow card) 85'	Stadium: Estadio Caliente; Referee: Fabricio Morales

July 27, 2012 Round 2	León	4 – 0	Tijuana	León, Guanajuato
21:30	Maz (yellow card) 27'; Peña 31', 64'; Montes 60'; Burbano 64' (pen.); Lobos (yellow card) 72'	Report	Saucedo (yellow card) 29'; Gandolfi (yellow card) 49'; Aguilar (yellow card) 51'; Arce (yellow card) 59' (red card) 73'; Leandro (yellow card) 59'	Stadium: Estadio León; Referee: Fernando Guerrero

August 3, 2012 Round 3	Tijuana	1 – 0	UNAM	Tijuana, Baja California
17:30	Castillo (yellow card) 5'; Hernández (yellow card) 31'; Aguilar 45+'; Gandolfi (yellow card) 57'; Leandro (yellow card) 63'	Report	Bravo (yellow card) 5'; Velarde (yellow card) 28'	Stadium: Estadio Caliente; Referee: Erim Ramírez

August 11, 2012 Round 4	Pachuca	2 – 2	Tijuana	Pachuca, Hidalgo
19:00	Borja 61' da Silva (yellow card) 64'; N. Castillo 89'	Report	Aguilar (yellow card) 16', (goal) 33'; Pellerano (yellow card) 54'; Arce 65'; Martínez (yellow card) 69' (yellow-red card) 82'	Stadium: Estadio Hidalgo; Referee: Francisco Chacón

August 17, 2012 Round 5	Tijuana	2 – 1	UANL	Tijuana, Baja California
17:30	Moreno 15'; Arce 33'; Olsina (yellow card) 83'	Report	Hernández 63'	Stadium: Estadio Caliente; Attendance: 21,733; Referee: José Alfredo Peñaloza

August 25, 2012 Round 6	América	0 – 1	Tijuana	Mexico City
17:00	Montenegro (yellow card) 4'; Aguilar (yellow card) 36' (yellow-red card) 74'; Jiménez (yellow card) 88'	Report	Aguilar (yellow card) 3'; Pellerano 40', (yellow card) 75'; Castillo (yellow card) 74'; Núñez (yellow card) 90+3'; Mohamed (red card) 90+4' (manager)	Stadium: Estadio Azteca; Referee: Mauricio Morales

August 31, 2012 Round 7	Tijuana	2 – 0	Chiapas	Tijuana, Baja California
17:30	Moreno 41' (pen.); Riascos 82', (yellow card) 83'	Report	Martínez (yellow card) 27'; Andrade (yellow card) 48'	Stadium: Estadio Caliente; Referee: Roberto García Orozco

September 16, 2012 Round 8	Atlante	1 – 2	Tijuana	Cancún, Quintana Roo
17:00	Venegas (yellow card) 37'; O. Martínez (yellow card) 38'; Paredes 87'; Calvo (yellow card) 90+3'	Report	Aguilar (yellow card) 25'; Gandolfi (yellow card) 37'; Pellerano (yellow card) 44'; Riascos 50'; Moreno 51'	Stadium: Estadio Andrés Quintana Roo; Attendance: 6,473; Referee: Miguel Ángel Ayala

September 22, 2012 Round 9	Tijuana	1 – 1	Atlas	Tijuana, Baja California
19:30	Riascos 75'	Report	Mancilla 30'; Santos (yellow card) 36'; Pinto (yellow card) 53'; Ponce (yellow card) 89'	Stadium: Estadio Caliente; Attendance: 22,333; Referee: Erim Ramírez

September 29, 2012 Round 10	Querétaro	0 – 1	Tijuana	Querétaro, Querétaro
17:00	Bueno (yellow card) 22'; Pineda (yellow card) 44'; Jiménez (yellow card) 66'; Landín (yellow card) 82'; García Arias (yellow card) 88'	Report	Aguilar (yellow card) 10' (yellow-red card) 55'; Gandolfi (yellow card) 17'; Arce (yellow card) 19'; Moreno 38'; Pellerano (yellow card) 63'	Stadium: Estadio Corregidora; Attendance: 12,740; Referee: Miguel Ángel Ortega

October 4, 2012 Round 11	Monterrey	1 – 1	Tijuana	Monterrey, Nuevo León
21:00	Riascos 47' (o.g.); Reyna (yellow card) 72'	Report	Abrego 28'; Castillo (yellow card) 38'; Arce (yellow card) 45+3'; Moreno (yellow card) 70'; Gandolfi (yellow card) 74'	Stadium: Estadio Tecnológico; Attendance: 33,060; Referee: Fabricio Morales

October 7, 2012 Round 12	Tijuana	1 – 0	Toluca	Tijuana, Baja California
18:00	Gandolfi (yellow card) 4'; Pellerano (yellow card) 36'; Riascos 50'; Martínez (yellow card) 82'; Aguilar (yellow card) 90+2'	Report	Tejada (yellow card) 34'; Sinha (yellow card) 57' (yellow-red card) 73'; Lucas Silva (yellow card) 74'	Stadium: Estadio Caliente; Attendance: 22,333; Referee: José Alfredo Peñaloza

October 12, 2012 Round 13	Santos Laguna	2 – 2	Tijuana	Torreón, Coahuila
19:00	Ludueña 8', 73'; Salinas (yellow card) 26'	Report	Garza 28'; Leandro (yellow card) 39'; Hernández (yellow card) 48'; Riascos 68'; Tahuilán (yellow card) 90+3'	Stadium: Estadio TSM Corona; Attendance: 20,092; Referee: Jorge Antonio Pérez

October 21, 2012 Round 14	Tijuana	2 – 2	Cruz Azul	Tijuana, Baja California
19:30	Flores 18' (o.g.); Leandro (yellow card) 24'; Riascos (yellow card) 36', (goal) 67'; Gandolfi (yellow card) 42'; Hernández (yellow card) 56'; Aguilar (yellow card) 71'	Report	Pavone 4'; Vela (yellow card) 22'; Giménez (yellow card) 35'; Corona (yellow card) 42'; Bravo (yellow card) 50'; Perea (yellow card) 65'; A. Castro 75'	Stadium: Estadio Caliente; Attendance: 22,333; Referee: Jorge Isaac Rojas

October 27, 2012 Round 15	Morelia	1 – 1	Tijuana	Morelia, Michoacán
19:00	Sabah 21' (pen.); Ramírez (yellow card) 39'; Salinas (yellow card) 46'; Valdéz (yellow card) 52'; Montero (yellow card) 66'	Report	Riascos 9'; Aguilar (yellow card) 20'; Gandolfi (yellow card) 26'; Perllerano (yellow card) 37'; Arce (yellow card) 52'	Stadium: Estadio Morelos; Attendance: 17,138; Referee: Ricardo Arellano

November 2, 2012 Round 16	Tijuana	0 – 0	San Luis	Tijuana, Baja California
19:30	Pellerano (yellow card) 63'; Leandro (yellow card) 88'; Aguilar (yellow card) 90+1'	Report	Everton (yellow card) 14'; Cadavid (yellow card) 25'; Correa (yellow card) 58'; Pérez (yellow card) 75'; Velasco (yellow card) 90+1'	Stadium: Estadio Caliente; Attendance: 22,189; Referee: Fernando Guerrero

November 11, 2012 Round 17	Guadalajara	0 – 2	Tijuana	Zapopan, Jalisco
17:00	Fabián (yellow card) 61'	Report	Moreno 1'; Riascos 3'; Gandolfi (yellow card) 45+3'; Pellerano (yellow card) 62'; Aguilar (yellow card) 63'	Stadium: Estadio Omnilife; Attendance: 37,436; Referee: Francisco Chacón

==== Final phase ====
November 15, 2012 Quarter-finals	Monterrey	0 – 1	Tijuana	Monterrey, Nuevo León
19:00	Ayoví (yellow card) 45'; Orozco (yellow card) 90+5'	Report	Gandolfi (yellow card) 44'; Leandro (yellow card) 72'; Garza 86'	Stadium: Estadio Tecnológico; Attendance: 26,239; Referee: Erim Ramírez

November 18, 2012 Quarter-finals	Tijuana	1 – 1	Monterrey	Tijuana, Baja California
16:30	Riascos (yellow card) 26'; Leandro (yellow card) 27'; Moreno (yellow card) 36'; Aguilar 51'	Report	Reyna (yellow card) 34'; Solís (yellow card) 89' de Nigris 90+3'	Stadium: Estadio Caliente; Attendance: 22,333; Referee: Roberto García Orozco

Tijuana advanced 2–1 on aggregate

November 22, 2012 Semi-finals	León	2 – 0	Tijuana	León, Guanajuato
21:06	Britos (yellow card) 14'; Arce 55'; Peña 57'; Burbano (yellow card) 80'; Muñoz Mustafá (yellow card) 90'	Report	Corona (yellow card) 24'; Moreno (yellow card) 28'; Riascos (yellow card) 37'; Pellerano (yellow card) 49'	Stadium: Estadio León; Attendance: 24,808; Referee: Francisco Chacón

November 25, 2012 Semi-finals	Tijuana	3 – 0	León	Tijuana, Baja California
16:30	Pellerano (yellow card) 22'; Aguilar (yellow card) 41'; Martínez 43'; Riascos 68'; Castillo (yellow card) 71'; Ruiz 90', (yellow card) 90'	Report	Rojas (yellow card) 12'; González (yellow card) 45'; Burbano (yellow card) 71'	Stadium: Estadio Caliente; Attendance: 22,333; Referee: Marco Antonio Rodríguez

Tijuana advanced 3–2 on aggregate

November 29, 2012 Final	Tijuana	2 – 1	Toluca	Tijuana, Baja California
19:00	Martínez 23'; Aguilar 39'; Pellerano (yellow card) 41'; Arce (yellow card) 83'	Report	Benítez 26'; Sinha (yellow card) 41'; Talavera (yellow card) 81'	Stadium: Estadio Caliente; Attendance: 22,333; Referee: Roberto García Orozco

December 2, 2012 Final	Toluca	0 – 2	Tijuana	Toluca, Estado de México
18:00	Esquivel (yellow card) 7'; Novaretti (yellow card) 68'	Report	Ruiz 69'; Riascos 70', (yellow card) 71'; Martínez (yellow card) 86'	Stadium: Estadio Nemesio Díez; Referee: Francisco Chacón

Tijuana won 4–1 on aggregate

Tijuana won their first title in history

=== Goalscorers ===
==== Regular season ====
Position	Nation	Name	Goals scored
1.	(Colombia)	Duvier Riascos	8
2.	(Argentina)	Alfredo Moreno	5
3.	(Paraguay)	Pablo Aguilar	3
3.	(Mexico)	Fernando Arce	3
5.	(Mexico)	Joshua Abrego	1
5.	(United States)	Greg Garza	1
5.	(Argentina)	Cristian Pellerano	1
5.		Own Goals	1
TOTAL			23

==== Final phase ====
Position	Nation	Name	Goals scored
1.	(Paraguay)	Pablo Aguilar	2
1.	(Ecuador)	Fidel Martínez	2
1.	(Colombia)	Duvier Riascos	2
1.	(Mexico)	Richard Ruiz	2
5.	(United States)	Greg Garza	1
TOTAL			9

=== Results ===
==== Results summary ====
Overall								Home						Away					
Pld	W	D	L	GF	GA	GD	Pts	W	D	L	GF	GA	GD	W	D	L	GF	GA	GD
17	9	7	1	23	15	+8	34	5	3	0	11	4	+7	4	4	1	12	11	+1

Last updated: 11 November 2012.
Source: Apertura 2012 results

==== Results by round ====
Round	1	2	3	4	5	6	7	8	9	10	11	12	13	14	15	16	17
Ground	H	A	H	A	H	A	H	A	H	A	A	H	A	H	A	H	A
Result	W	L	W	D	W	W	W	W	D	W	D	W	D	D	D	D	W
Position	2	10	5	5	3	2	2	1	2	2	2	1	1	2	1	1	2

Updated to match(es) played on 11 November 2012. Source: Apertura 2012 results and mediotiempo.com
A = Away; H = Home; W = Win; D = Draw; L = Loss

== Copa MX ==
=== Group stage ===
Win Draw Loss

==== Apertura results ====
July 24, 2012 1	Tijuana	0 – 0	Mérida	Tijuana, Baja California
19:00	González (red card) 36'; Martínez (yellow card) 52'	Report	Reyes (yellow card) 35'	Stadium: Estadio Caliente; Referee: Miguel Ángel Chacón

July 31, 2012 2	Mérida	0 – 1	Tijuana	Mérida, Yucatán
19:00		Report	Garza (yellow card) 31'; Dominguez 50'; Ruiz (yellow card) 56'	Stadium: Estadio Carlos Iturralde; Referee: Baruch Castellanos

August 14, 2012 3	Celaya	2 – 1	Tijuana	Celaya, Guanajuato
19:00	García (yellow card) 12'; Pardini 30'; Ruiz 90' (o.g.)	Report	Nava 18'	Stadium: Estadio Miguel Alemán; Attendance: 4,130; Referee: Uriel Olvera

August 21, 2012 4	Tijuana	2 – 1	Celaya	Tijuana, Baja California
19:00	Enríquez 13'; Ruiz 23'; Zermeño (yellow card) 45+'	Report	Pardini 20'; García (yellow card) 57' (yellow-red card) 75'; Solárzano (yellow card) 62'; Ramos (yellow card) 88'	Stadium: Estadio Caliente; Referee: Víctor Bisguerra

August 28, 2012 5	UNAM	2 – 2	Tijuana	Mexico City
21:00	Nieto 16', (yellow card) 80'; Luis García 45' (pen.); Pérez (yellow card) 82'	Report	Martínez 41'; González 90'	Stadium: Estadio Olímpico Universitario; Attendance: 6,196; Referee: César Arturo Ramos

September 19, 2012 6	Tijuana	2 – 1	UNAM	Tijuana, Baja California
19:00	Aguilar 18'; Enriquez 69'	Report	Nieto 33'	Stadium: Estadio Caliente; Attendance: 18,432; Referee: Antony Zanjuampa

=== Knockout stage ===
September 26, 2012 Quarter-finals	UAT	5 – 5 (7 – 6 p)	Tijuana	Ciudad Victoria, Tamaulipas
21:15	Pereira (yellow card) 25'; Kontogiannis 42'; Olivera (yellow card) 63', (goal) 66', 70'; Rosas 82'; Nurse 90+2'	Report	Nava 3', 43'; Martínez 30'; Garza (yellow card) 46'; Enríquez 51'; Zermeño (yellow card) 58'; Tahuilán 90+6', (yellow card) 90+6'	Stadium: Estadio Marte R. Gómez; Attendance: 11,571; Referee: Erick Miranda
	Penalties
	Nurse (penalty scored); Pacheco (penalty scored); Silva (penalty scored); Kontogiannis (penalty scored); Olivera (penalty missed); Vázquez (penalty scored); Espinoza (penalty scored); Jiménez (penalty scored)		(penalty scored) Corona; (penalty scored) Hernández; (penalty scored) Gandolfi; (penalty missed) Martínez; (penalty scored) Riascos; (penalty scored) Ruiz; (penalty scored) Abrego; (penalty missed) Domínguez

=== Goalscorers ===
Position	Nation	Name	Goals scored
1.	(Mexico)	Raúl Enríquez	3
1.	(Mexico)	Raúl Nava	3
3.	(Ecuador)	Fidel Martínez	2
3.	(Mexico)	Alfredo González Tahuilán	2
5.	(Paraguay)	Pablo Aguilar	1
5.	(Mexico)	Adolfo Domínguez	1
5.	(Mexico)	Richard Ruíz	1
TOTAL			13

=== Results ===
==== Results by round ====
Round	1	2	3	4	5	6
Ground	H	A	A	H	A	H
Result	D	W	L	W	D	W
Position	1	1	3	1	1	1

Updated to match(es) played on 19 September 2012. Source: Apertura results and mediotiempo.com
A = Away; H = Home; W = Win; D = Draw; L = Loss

== Torneo Clausura ==
=== Squad ===
Note: Flags indicate national team as defined under FIFA eligibility rules; some limited exceptions apply. Players may hold more than one non-FIFA nationality.

No.	Pos.	Nation	Player
2	DF	USA	Édgar Castillo
3	DF	ARG	Javier Gandolfi (Captain)
4	DF	MEX	Miguel Almazán
5	DF	MEX	Joshua Abrego
6	DF	PAR	Pablo Aguilar
7	MF	MEX	Leandro Augusto
8	MF	MEX	Fernando Arce (vice-captain)
9	FW	ARG	Alfredo Moreno
10	FW	MEX	Raúl Enríquez
11	MF	ECU	Fidel Martínez
12	GK	MEX	Sergio Vega
13	GK	MEX	Cirilo Saucedo
14	DF	MEX	Alfredo González Tahuilán
15	MF	USA	Joe Corona
16	MF	ARG	Cristian Pellerano
17	MF	MEX	Jorge Hernández
18	MF	MEX	Luis Ángel García
19	GK	MEX	Adrián Zermeño

No.	Pos.	Nation	Player
20	FW	COL	Duvier Riascos
21	DF	MEX	Juan Pablo Santiago
22	DF	MEX	Juan Carlos Núñez
23	MF	MEX	Richard Ruíz
24	DF	USA	Greg Garza
25	MF	USA	Alejandro Guido
26	FW	MEX	Diego Olsina
27	DF	MEX	José Madueña
28	DF	MEX	Carlos Rubio
29	FW	MEX	Raúl Nava
30	GK	MEX	Jesús García
31	DF	MEX	Luis Trujillo
32	MF	USA	Esteban Rodríguez
33	FW	MEX	Bruno Piceno
34	MF	MEX	Noé Maya
35	FW	MEX	Daniel Márquez
36	MF	ARG	Franco Amoroso
37	DF	MEX	Édgar Villegas

=== Regular season ===
Win Draw Loss

==== Clausura 2013 results ====
January 6, 2013 Round 1	Puebla	1 – 2	Tijuana	Puebla, Puebla
16:00	Juárez 45'	Report	Riascos 30'; Pellerano 40'; Castillo (yellow card) 60'; Martínez (yellow card) 80'	Stadium: Estadio Cuauhtémoc; Attendance: 23,444; Referee: Oscar Macías Romo

January 12, 2013 Round 2	Tijuana	1 – 0	León	Tijuana, Baja California
17:00	Moreno 6'; Pellerano (yellow card) 22'; Castillo (yellow card) 27'; Riascos (yellow card) 38'; Arce (yellow card) 43'; Leandro (red card) 79'	Report	Santibañez (yellow card) 14'; Márquez (yellow card) 28'; Peña (red card) 67'; Zatarín (yellow card) 74'	Stadium: Estadio Caliente; Attendance: 22,233; Referee: Paul Delgadillo

January 20, 2013 Round 3	UNAM	1 – 2	Tijuana	Coyoacán, Mexico City
12:00	Herrera (yellow card) 22'; Cabrera (yellow card) 35'; Cortés 88'	Report	Arce (yellow card) 16', (goal) 67'; Ruiz 28', (yellow card) 80'	Stadium: Estadio Olímpico Universitario; Attendance: 22,651; Referee: Miguel Ángel Chacón

January 26, 2013 Round 4	Tijuana	2 – 0	Pachuca	Tijuana, Baja California
17:00	Castillo (yellow card) 17'; Pellerano (yellow card) 54'; Moreno 57' (pen.); Saucedo (yellow card) 80'; Enriquez 84'	Report	Reyna (yellow card) 9'; Arreola (yellow card) 30'; Vidrio (yellow card) 37'; Hernández (yellow card) 76'	Stadium: Estadio Caliente; Attendance: 22,633; Referee: Ricardo Arellano

February 2, 2013 Round 5	UANL	2 – 2	Tijuana	San Nicolás de los Garza, Nuevo León
19:00	Lobos 53', 65'; Torres (yellow card) 70'	Report	Moreno 13'; Gandolfi (yellow card) 56'; Pellerano (yellow card) 61'; Riascos 74'	Stadium: Estadio Universitario; Attendance: 40,383; Referee: Francisco Chacón

February 9, 2013 Round 6	Tijuana	1 – 2	América	Tijuana, Baja California
17:00	Pellerano (yellow card) 10'; Arce (yellow card) 11'; Aguilar 75'; Gandolfi (yellow card) 84'	Report	Sambueza (yellow card) 1' (yellow-red card) 21'; Martínez 12' (pen.), (yellow card) 18'; F. Rodríguez (yellow card) 19'; Mosquera (yellow card) 22' (yellow-red card) 38'; Aguilar 53'	Stadium: Estadio Caliente; Attendance: 23,133; Referee: Miguel Ángel Flores

February 15, 2013 Round 7	Chiapas	2 – 0	Tijuana	Tuxtla Gutiérrez, Chiapas
19:30	Rey 50' (pen.), 62'; Bedolla (yellow card) 67'; Jiménez (yellow card) 73'; Gastélum (yellow card) 77'; Córdoba (yellow card) 88'	Report	Castillo (yellow card) 6' (yellow-red card) 48'; Núñez (yellow card) 63'; Riascos (yellow card) 79'; Gandolfi (yellow card) 82'; Pellerano (yellow card) 90+2'	Stadium: Estadio Victor Manuel Reyna; Attendance: 10,551; Referee: Roberto García Orozco

February 23, 2013 Round 8	Tijuana	2 – 0	Atlante	Tijuana, Baja California
17:00	Enríquez 2'; Núñez (yellow card) 72'; Riascos 86'	Report	Bizera (yellow card) 25'; Vera (yellow card) 36'	Stadium: Estadio Caliente; Attendance: 23,133; Referee: Fabricio Morales

March 2, 2013 Round 9	Atlas	1 – 0	Tijuana	Guadalajara, Jalisco
21:00	Bravo 3'; Chávez (yellow card) 39'; Cufré (yellow card) 50'; Vuoso (yellow card) 63'; Brizuela (yellow card) 80'; Ayala (yellow card) 90+3'	Report	Gandolfi (yellow card) 17'; Arce (yellow card) 20'; Pellerano (yellow card) 49'; Martínez (yellow card) 76' (yellow-red card) 87'; Ábrego (yellow card) 85'	Stadium: Estadio Jalisco; Attendance: 39,184; Referee: César Arturo Ramos

March 9, 2013 Round 10	Tijuana	0 – 1	Querétaro	Tijuana, Baja California
17:00	Maya (yellow card) 20'; Garza (yellow card) 61'	Report	Escalante (yellow card) 22'; Cosme 33'; Apodi (yellow card) 85'	Stadium: Estadio Caliente; Attendance: 23,133; Referee: Francisco Chacón

March 16, 2013 Round 11	Tijuana	2 – 2	Monterrey	Tijuana, Baja California
21:00	Martínez 27', (yellow card) 80'; Núñez (yellow card) 33'; Gandolfi (yellow card) 46'; Riascos (yellow card) 35', (goal) 87'; Moreno (yellow card) 80'	Report	de Nigris 31'; Riascos 34' (o.g.); Zavala (yellow card) 56'; Cardozo (yellow card) 58'; Ayoví (yellow card) 65'	Stadium: Estadio Caliente; Attendance: 23,133; Referee: Miguel Ángel Ayala

March 30, 2013 Round 12	Toluca	1 – 0	Tijuana	Toluca, Estado de México
17:00	Wilson Mathías 7'; Talavera (yellow card) 11'; Acosta (yellow card) 30'; Sinha (yellow card) 87'	Report	Martínez (red card) 9'; Pellerano (yellow card) 10'; Riascos (yellow card) 34'; Márquez (yellow card) 72'	Stadium: Estadio Nemesio Díez; Attendance: 10,896; Referee: Jorge Isaac Rojas

April 6, 2013 Round 13	Tijuana	0 – 0	Santos Laguna	Tijuana, Baja California
21:00		Report		Stadium: Estadio Caliente; Attendance: 23,133; Referee: José Alfredo Peñaloza

April 13, 2013 Round 14	Cruz Azul	5 – 0	Tijuana	Benito Juárez, Mexico City
17:00	Pavone 32', (yellow card) 69'; T. Gutiérrez 56', (yellow card) 59'; G. Flores (yellow card) 51', (goal) 76'; A. Castro (yellow card) 66'; Orozco 89', 90+2'	Report	Pellerano (yellow card) 54' (red card) 59'; Gandolfi (yellow card) 54'; Riascos (yellow card) 58'; Saucedo (yellow card) 73'	Stadium: Estadio Azul; Attendance: 24,989; Referee: Antony Zanjuampa

April 20, 2013 Round 15	Tijuana	1 – 2	Morelia	Tijuana, Baja California
17:00	Márquez 34'; Riascos (yellow card) 53'; Martínez (yellow card) 54'; Arce (yellow card) 61'; Núñez (yellow card) 83'; Corona (red card) 88'; Castillo (yellow card) 90+1' (yellow-red card) 90+1'	Report	Salinas (yellow card) 4'; Mancilla (yellow card) 44', (goal) 73', 75'; Pérez (yellow card) 54'	Stadium: Estadio Caliente; Attendance: 23,133; Referee: Jorge Antonio Pérez

April 27, 2013 Round 16	San Luis	1 – 0	Tijuana	San Luis Potosí, San Luis Potosí
21:00	López (yellow card) 57'; Cuevas (yellow card) 63'; Velasco (yellow card) 76'; Zamora 85'	Report	Almazán (yellow card) 33'; Olsina (red card) 53'; Tahuilán (yellow card) 57'; Núñez (red card) 64'	Stadium: Estadio Alfonso Lastras; Attendance: 19,080; Referee: Fernando Guerrero

May 3, 2013 Round 17	Tijuana	4 – 0	Guadalajara	Tijuana, Baja California
19:30	Piceno 19'; Riascos 32'; Ruiz 41'; Martínez 45+1'; Pellerano (yellow card) 79'	Report	Álvarez (yellow card) 46'	Stadium: Estadio Caliente; Attendance: 23,173; Referee: Roberto García Orozco

Tijuana did not qualify to the Final Phase

=== Goalscorers ===
Position	Nation	Name	Goals scored
1.	(Colombia)	Duvier Riascos	5
2.	(Argentina)	Alfredo Moreno	3
3.	(Mexico)	Raúl Enríquez	2
3.	(Ecuador)	Fidel Martínez	2
3.	(Mexico)	Richard Ruiz	2
6.	(Paraguay)	Pablo Aguilar	1
6.	(Mexico)	Fernando Arce	1
6.	(Mexico)	Daniel Márquez	1
6.	(Argentina)	Cristian Pellerano	1
6.	(Mexico)	Bruno Piceno	1
TOTAL			19

=== Results ===
==== Results summary ====
Overall								Home						Away					
Pld	W	D	L	GF	GA	GD	Pts	W	D	L	GF	GA	GD	W	D	L	GF	GA	GD
17	6	3	8	19	21	−2	21	4	2	3	13	7	+6	2	1	5	6	14	−8

Last updated: 4 May 2013.
Source: Clausura 2013 results

==== Results by round ====
Round	1	2	3	4	5	6	7	8	9	10	11	12	13	14	15	16	17
Ground	A	H	A	H	A	H	A	H	A	H	H	A	H	A	H	A	H
Result	W	W	W	W	D	L	L	W	L	L	D	L	D	L	L	L	W
Position	4	3	3	2	2	3	4	4	4	6	7	9	8	12	11	11	10

Updated to match(es) played on 5 May 2013. Source: Clausura 2013 results and mediotiempo.com
A = Away; H = Home; W = Win; D = Draw; L = Loss

== Copa Libertadores ==
=== Group 5 ===
Pos	Team	Pld	W	D	L	GF	GA	GD	Pts	COR	TIJ	SJO	MIL
1	(Brazil) Corinthians (A)	6	4	1	1	10	2	+8	13		3–0	3–0	2–0
2	(Mexico) Tijuana (A)	6	4	1	1	8	4	+4	13	1–0		4–0	1–0
3	(Bolivia) San José	6	1	2	3	5	11	−6	5	1–1	1–1		2–0
4	(Colombia) Millonarios	6	1	0	5	2	8	−6	3	0–1	0–1	2–1	

Source: RSSSF
(A) Advanced to the round of 16

=== Second stage ===
Win Draw Loss

==== Copa Libertadores results ====
February 19, 2013 1	Millonarios (Colombia)	0 – 1	(Mexico) Tijuana	Bogotá, Colombia
19:30 UTC−05:00	Torres (yellow card) 69' (yellow-red card) 90+5'	Report	Pellerano (yellow card) 23'; Ruiz 62'; Saucedo (yellow card) 65'; Gandolfi (yellow card) 90+6'	Stadium: Estadio El Campín; Referee: Marlon Escalante (Venezuela)

February 26, 2013 2	Tijuana (Mexico)	4 – 0	(Bolivia) San José	Tijuana, Mexico
19:15 UTC−08:00	Castillo 4'; Aguilar 47'; Corona 49'; Martínez 74'	Report	Tordoya (yellow card) 12'; Carrizo (yellow card) 62'; Sejas (yellow card) 70'	Stadium: Estadio Caliente; Referee: Omar Ponce (Ecuador)

March 6, 2013 3	Tijuana (Mexico)	1 – 0	(Brazil) Corinthians	Tijuana, Mexico
17:00 UTC−8	Moreno (yellow card) 32'; Gandolfi (yellow card) 54', (goal) 67'; Aguilar (yellow card) 59'	Report	Paulinho (yellow card) 17'; Fábio Santos (yellow card) 53'; Guerrero (yellow card) 85'	Stadium: Estadio Caliente; Referee: Víctor Carrillo (Peru)

March 13, 2013 4	Corinthians (Brazil)	3 – 0	(Mexico) Tijuana	São Paulo, Brazil
22:00 UTC−03:00	Pato 28'; Guerrero 37'; Alessandro (yellow card) 38'; Paulinho (yellow card) 79', (goal) 83'	Report	Núñez (yellow card) 39'; Aguilar (yellow card) 45+2'; Moreno (yellow card) 69'; Pellerano (yellow card) 71'; Arce (yellow card) 77'	Stadium: Estádio do Pacaembu; Referee: Enrique Osses (Chile)

April 3, 2013 5	San José (Bolivia)	1 – 1	(Mexico) Tijuana	Oruro, Bolivia
18:45 UTC−04:00	Palacios (yellow card) 30' (yellow-red card) 76'; Marcelo Gomes 81'	Report	Martínez 66'; Ruiz (yellow card) 74'; Madueña (yellow card) 77'	Stadium: Estadio Jesús Bermúdez; Referee: Diego Ceballos (Argentina)

April 10, 2013 6	Tijuana (Mexico)	1 – 0	(Colombia) Millonarios	Tijuana, Mexico
18:00 UTC−07:00	Martínez 90+4'	Report	Ithurralde (yellow card) 76'	Stadium: Estadio Caliente; Referee: Carlos Amarilla (Paraguay)

=== Knockout stage ===
April 30, 2013 Round of 16	Tijuana (Mexico)	0 – 0	(Brazil) Palmeiras	Tijuana, Mexico
18:30 UTC−7	Aguilar (yellow card) 19'; Pellerano (yellow card) 34'; Gandolfi (yellow card) 54'	Report	Charles (yellow card) 35'; Marcelo Oliveira (yellow card) 88'	Stadium: Estadio Caliente; Referee: Martín Vázquez (Uruguay)

May 14, 2013 Round of 16	Palmeiras (Brazil)	1 – 2	(Mexico) Tijuana	São Paulo, Brazil
22:00 UTC−3	Souza 62' (pen.)	Report	Riascos 27'; Arce 52'	Stadium: Estádio do Pacaembu; Referee: Juan Soto (Venezuela)

Tijuana won on points 4–1.

May 23, 2013 Quarter-finals	Tijuana (Mexico)	2 – 2	(Brazil) Atlético Mineiro	Tijuana, Mexico
17:30 UTC−7	Riascos 33'; F. Martínez 54'	Report	Diego Tardelli 67'; Luan 90+3'	Stadium: Estadio Caliente; Referee: Hernando Buitrago (Colombia)

May 30, 2013 Quarter-finals	Atlético Mineiro (Brazil)	1 – 1	(Mexico) Tijuana	Belo Horizonte, Brazil
22:00 UTC−3	Réver 41'	Report	Riascos 26'	Stadium: Estádio Raimundo Sampaio (Independência); Referee: Patricio Polic (Chile)

Tied on points 2–2, Atlético Mineiro won on away goals.

=== Goalscorers ===
Position	Nation	Name	Goals scored
1.	(Ecuador)	Fidel Martínez	4
2.	(Colombia)	Duvier Riascos	3
3.	(Paraguay)	Pablo Aguilar	1
3.	(Mexico)	Fernando Arce	1
3.	(United States)	Edgar Castillo	1
3.	(United States)	Joe Corona	1
3.	(Argentina)	Javier Gandolfi	1
3.	(Mexico)	Richard Ruiz	1
TOTAL			13

=== Results ===
==== Results summary ====
Overall								Home						Away					
Pld	W	D	L	GF	GA	GD	Pts	W	D	L	GF	GA	GD	W	D	L	GF	GA	GD
6	4	1	1	8	4	+4	13	3	0	0	6	0	+6	1	1	1	2	4	−2

Last updated: 2 May 2013.
Source: Copa Libertadores results

==== Results by round ====
Round	1	2	3	4	5	6
Ground	A	H	H	A	A	H
Result	W	W	W	L	D	W
Position	1	1	1	1	2	2

Updated to match(es) played on 2 May 2013. Source: Copa Libertadores results
A = Away; H = Home; W = Win; D = Draw; L = Loss
