= 2013–14 Club Tijuana season =

Club Tijuana
2013–14 season
- Chairman: Jorge Alberto Hank
- Manager: Jorge Almiron
- Stadium: Estadio Caliente
- Apertura 2013: 10th
- Clausura 2014: 7th
- Champions League: Semi-final
- Top goalscorer: League: All: Dario Bennedetto (8)
Home colours	Away colours

The 2013–14 Tijuana season is the 67th professional season of Mexico's top-flight football league. The season is split into two tournaments—the Torneo Apertura and the Torneo Clausura—each with identical formats and each contested by the same eighteen teams.

== Torneo Apertura ==
=== Squad ===
Note: Flags indicate national team as defined under FIFA eligibility rules; some limited exceptions apply. Players may hold more than one non-FIFA nationality.

No.	Pos.	Nation	Player
2	DF	USA	Édgar Castillo
3	DF	ARG	Javier Gandolfi (captain)
6	DF	PAR	Pablo Aguilar (on loan from Chiapas)
8	MF	MEX	Fernando Arce (vice-captain)
9	FW	USA	Herculez Gomez
10	MF	ECU	Fidel Martínez
11	FW	MEX	Daniel Márquez
13	GK	MEX	Cirilo Saucedo
14	DF	MEX	Alfredo González (on loan from UANL)
15	MF	USA	Joe Corona
16	MF	ARG	Cristian Pellerano
18	FW	ARG	Darío Benedetto
19	GK	MEX	Adrián Zermeño
21	FW	MEX	Bruno Piceno

No.	Pos.	Nation	Player
22	DF	MEX	Juan Carlos Núñez
23	MF	MEX	Richard Ruiz
24	DF	USA	Greg Garza
25	GK	MEX	Sergio Vega
26	DF	MEX	José Antonio Madueña
31	DF	MEX	Luis Trujillo
32	MF	USA	Esteban Rodríguez
38	DF	MEX	Oliver Ortiz
40	DF	MEX	Aldo Polo
42	MF	MEX	Javier Güemez
43	MF	ARG	Diego Olsina
45	FW	MEX	Emmanuel Cerda
47	MF	USA	Paul Arriola

=== Regular season ===
Win Draw Loss

==== Apertura 2013 results ====
July 19, 2013 Round 1	Tijuana	3 - 3	Atlas	Tijuana, Baja California
19:30	Benedetto 6', 17', 64'; Polo (yellow card) 39'; Gandolfi (yellow card) 90+3'	Report	Vuoso 29' (pen.), 69'; Erpen (yellow card) 42'; Chávez (yellow card) 59'; Asad (red card) 83' (manager); Rivera 83'	Stadium: Estadio Caliente; Attendance: 23,433; Referee: Jorge Antonio Pérez

July 27, 2013 Round 2	América	v	Tijuana	Mexico City
17:00				Stadium: Estadio Azteca

July 30, 2013 Round 3	Tijuana	1 - 0	Pachuca	Tijuana, Baja California
19:30	Diego Alberto Olsina 48'			Stadium: Estadio Caliente

August 3, 2013 Round 4	Morelia	2 - 1	Tijuana	Morelia, Michoacán
19:00	Hector Mancilla 11', 49'		Fidel Martinez 64'	Stadium: Estadio Morelos; Referee: Paul Enrique Delgadillo

August 9, 2013 Round 5	Tijuana	2 - 0	UNAM	Tijuana, Baja California
19:30	Fidel Martinez 9'; Raul Enriquez 58'			Stadium: Estadio Caliente; Referee: Fernando Guerrero

August 17, 2013 Round 6	Monterrey	2 - 1	Tijuana	Monterrey, Nuevo León
19:00	Neri Cardozo 77'; Humberto Suazo 89'		Paul Arriola 86'	Stadium: Estadio Tecnológico; Referee: Roberto Garcia Orozco

August 23, 2013 Round 7	Tijuana	1 - 1	Santos Laguna	Tijuana, Baja California
19:30				Stadium: Estadio Caliente

August 31, 2013 Round 8	Chiapas	3 - 1	Tijuana	Tuxtla Gutiérrez, Chiapas
21:00				Stadium: Estadio Víctor Manuel Reyna; Referee: Jorge Antonio Perez

September 7, 2013 Round 9 (Moved from Friday)	Tijuana	3 - 0	Veracruz	Tijuana, Baja California
19:30				Stadium: Estadio Caliente

September 15, 2013 Round 10	Guadalajara	2 - 2	Tijuana	Zapopan, Jalisco
17:00				Stadium: Estadio Omnilife

September 20, 2013 Round 11	Tijuana	0 - 0	Cruz Azul	Tijuana, Baja California
19:30				Stadium: Estadio Caliente

September 29, 2013 Round 12	Puebla	2 - 0	Tijuana	Puebla, Puebla
12:00				Stadium: Estadio Cuauhtémoc

October 1, 2013 Round 2 (Resechdule)	América	2 - 0	Tijuana	Mexico City
20:00				Stadium: Estadio Azteca

October 4, 2013 Round 13	Tijuana	1-0	Querétaro	Tijuana, Baja California
19:30				Stadium: Estadio Caliente; Referee: Jorge Antonio Perez

October 20, 2013 Round 14	Toluca	0 – 0	Tijuana	Toluca, Estado de México
12:00				Stadium: Estadio Nemesio Díez

October 25, 2013 Round 15	Tijuana	0 – 0	UANL	Tijuana, Baja California
19:30				Stadium: Estadio Caliente

November 1, 2013 Round 16	Tijuana	4 - 1	Atlante	Tijuana, Baja California
19:30	Benedetto 12', 75' (yellow card) 69'; Núñez (yellow card) 34'; Saucedo (yellow card) 36'; Arce (red card) 39'; Pellerano 56' (pen.); Ruiz 83'	Summary	Sepúlveda 45+2' (pen.); Pérez (yellow card) 69' (red card) 71'	Stadium: Estadio Caliente; Referee: (Mexico) Francisco Chacon

November 9, 2013 Round 17	León	5 - 0	Tijuana	León, Guanajuato
20:05	Boselli 25', 84', 86', 90+1'; Ignacio González (yellow card) 28'; Elías Hernández (yellow card) 33'; Britos 51'	Summary	Pellerano (yellow card) 12'; Gandolfi (yellow card) 24'; Juan Carlos Núñez (yellow card) 56'; Benedetto (yellow card) 57' (yellow-red card)	Stadium: Estadio León; Referee: (Mexico) Fernando Guerrero

=== Goalscorers ===
Position	Nation	Name	Goals scored
1st	(Argentina)	Darío Benedetto	5
2nd	(Ecuador)	Fidel Martinez	2
T-3	(Argentina)	Diego Olsina	1
T-3	(Mexico)	Raul Enriquez	1
T-3	(United States)	Paul Arriola	1
TOTAL			8

=== Results ===
==== Results summary ====
Overall								Home						Away					
Pld	W	D	L	GF	GA	GD	Pts	W	D	L	GF	GA	GD	W	D	L	GF	GA	GD
17	5	6	6	20	23	−3	21	5	4	0	15	5	+10	0	2	6	5	18	−13

Last updated: 9 November 2013.
Source: Apertura 2013 results

==== Results by round ====
Round	1	2	3	4	5	6	7	8	9	10	11	12	13	14	15	16	17
Ground	H	A	H	A	H	A	H	A	H	A	H	A	H	A	H	H	A
Result	D	L	W	L	W	L	D	L	W	D	D	L	W	D	D	W	L
Position	5	11	6	9	8	9	9	12	12	12	12	12	9	12	12	10	10

Updated to match(es) played on 9 November 2013. Source: Apertura 2013 results and mediotiempo.com
A = Away; H = Home; W = Win; D = Draw; L = Loss
