= 2014–15 Club Tijuana season =

Club Tijuana
2016–17 season
- Chairman: Jorge Alberto Hank Inzunza
- Manager: Miguel Herrera
- Stadium: Estadio Caliente
- Apertura 2014: TBD
- Clausura 2015: 11th place
- Copa MX (Apertura): First stage
- Copa MX (Clausura): Quarter-finals
- Top goalscorer: Apertura:Darío Benedetto; Clausura:Dayro Moreno
Home colours	Away colours

The 2014–15 Club Tijuana season was the 68th professional season of Mexico's top-flight football league. The season is split into two tournaments—the Torneo Apertura and the Torneo Clausura—each with identical formats and each contested by the same eighteen teams. Tijuana began their season on July 17, 2014 against Puebla, Tijuana plays their homes games on Fridays at 19:30pm local time.

== Torneo Apertura 2014 ==
=== First-team squad ===
Note: Flags indicate national team as defined under FIFA eligibility rules; some limited exceptions apply. Players may hold more than one non-FIFA nationality.

No.	Pos.	Nation	Player
2	DF	MEX	Israel Jiménez
3	DF	ARG	Javier Gandolfi (Captain)
4	DF	MEX	Hernán Darío Pellerano
5	DF	MEX	Elio Castro
6	MF	MEX	Javier Güemez
7	MF	MEX	Alejandro Moreno
8	FW	ECU	José Ayoví
9	FW	ARG	Alfredo Moreno
10	FW	BRA	Darío Benedetto
11	FW	MEX	Henry Martín (on loan from Mérida)
13	GK	MEX	Cirilo Saucedo
15	MF	USA	Joe Corona
16	MF	ARG	Cristian Pellerano
17	FW	COL	Dayro Moreno
18	MF	VEN	Juan Arango (Vice-captain)
21	DF	MEX	Óliver Ortíz
22	DF	MEX	Juan Carlos Núñez

No.	Pos.	Nation	Player
23	MF	MEX	Richard Ruíz
24	DF	USA	Greg Garza
25	GK	MEX	Gibrán Lajud (on loan from Cruz Azul)
26	DF	MEX	Javier Salas
27	MF	USA	Alejandro Guido
28	MF	MEX	Édgar Villegas
29	MF	MEX	Luis Chávez
31	MF	MEX	Pedro Hernández
32	MF	MEX	Luis García
33	MF	MEX	José Herrera
47	MF	USA	Paul Arriola
85	DF	USA	John Requejo
90	FW	MEX	Luis Gerardo Chavez
92	MF	USA	Fernando Arce Jr.
94	FW	MEX	José Alberto García
112	GK	MEX	Dilan Nicoletti

For recent transfers, see List of Mexican football transfers winter 2013–14.

=== Regular season ===
Win Draw Loss

==== Apertura 2014 results ====
July 18, 2014 Round 1	Club Tijuana	0 – 1	Puebla	Tijuana, Baja California
21:30				Stadium: Estadio Caliente

July 26, 2014 Round 2	América	2 – 1	Club Tijuana	Mexico City
17:00				Stadium: Estadio Azteca

August 1, 2014 Round 3	Club Tijuana	1 – 1	Tigres	Tijuana, Baja California
21:30				Stadium: Estadio Caliente

August 8, 2014 Round 4	Morelia	0 – 1	Puebla	Morelia, Michoacán
19:30				Stadium: Estadio Morelos

August 15, 2014 Round 5	Club Tijuana	2 – 1	Chiapas	Tijuana, Baja California
21:30				Stadium: Estadio Caliente

August 24, 2014 Round 6	Pumas UNAM	1 – 1	Club Tijuana	Mexico City
12:00				Stadium: Estadio Olímpico Universitario

August 29, 2014 Round 7	Club Tijuana	1 – 1	Leones Negros	Tijuana, Baja California
21:30				Stadium: Estadio Caliente

September 13, 2014 Round 8	Pachuca	1 – 1	Club Tijuana	Pachuca, Hidalgo
20:05				Stadium: Estadio Hidalgo

September 19, 2014 Round 9	Club Tijuana	4 – 1	Santos	Tijuana, Baja California
21:30				Stadium: Estadio Caliente

September 26, 2014 Round 10	Veracruz	1 – 0	Club Tijuana	Veracruz, Veracruz
19:00				Stadium: Estadio Luis Pirata Fuente

October 1, 2014 Round 11	Club Tijuana	0 – 0	Cruz Azul	Tijuana, Baja California
21:30				Stadium: Estadio Caliente

October 4, 2014 Round 12	Monterrey	1 – 1	Club Tijuana	Monterrey, Nuevo León
19:00				Stadium: Estadio Tecnológico

October 17, 2014 Round 13	Club Tijuana	2 – 1	Querétaro	Tijuana, Baja California
21:30				Stadium: Estadio Caliente

October 26, 2014 Round 14	Guadalajara	3 – 3	Club Tijuana	Guadalajara, Jalisco
17:00				Stadium: Estadio Omnilife

October 1, 2014 Round 15	Club Tijuana	0 – 1	Toluca	Tijuana, Baja California
20:30				Stadium: Estadio Caliente

November 8, 2014 Round 16	Atlas	1 – 1	Club Tijuana	Guadalajara, Jalisco
21:00				Stadium: Estadio Jalisco

November 20, 2014 Round 17	Club Tijuana	3 – 2	León	Tijuana, Baja California
21:30				Stadium: Estadio Caliente

=== Goalscorers ===
==== Regular season ====
Position	Nation	Name	Goals scored
1.	(Argentina)	Darío Benedetto	9
2.	(Argentina)	Alfredo Moreno	5
3.	(Venezuela)	Juan Arango	3
4.	(Colombia)	Dayro Moreno	2
5.	(Mexico)	Richard Ruiz	1
TOTAL			21

Note: Those 21 goals include an own goal

=== Results ===
==== Results summary ====
Overall								Home						Away					
Pld	W	D	L	GF	GA	GD	Pts	W	D	L	GF	GA	GD	W	D	L	GF	GA	GD
17	4	9	4	21	19	+2	21	4	3	2	13	9	+4	0	6	2	8	10	−2

Last updated: May 30, 2015.
Source: Apertura 2014 results

== Apertura 2014 Copa MX ==
=== Group stage ===
Win Draw Loss

==== Apertura results ====
July 29, 2014 1	Club Tijuana	3 – 1	Zacatepec	Tijuana, Baja California
				Stadium: Estadio Caliente

5 August 2014 2	Zacatepec	2 – 1	Club Tijuana	Zacatepec, Morelos
				Stadium: Estadio Agustín Coruco Díaz

August 19, 2014 3	Coras Tepic	0 – 0	Club Tijuana	Tepic, Nayarit
				Stadium: Estadio Arena Cora

August 26, 2014 4	Club Tijuana	1 – 1	Coras Tepic	Tijuana, Baja California
				Stadium: Estadio Caliente

September 16, 2014 5	Guadalajara	2 - 0	Club Tijuana	Guadalajara, Jalisco
				Stadium: Estadio Omnilife

September 24, 2014 6	Club Tijuana	1 - 0	Guadalajara	Tijuana, Baja California
				Stadium: Estadio Caliente

=== Goalscorers ===
Position	Nation	Name	Goals scored
1.	(Mexico)	Henry Martín	2
2.	(Argentina)	Darío Benedetto	1
3.	(United States)	Joe Corona	1
4.	(Argentina)	Cristian Pellerano	1
5.	(Venezuela)	Juan Arango	1
TOTAL			6

== Torneo Clausura 2015 ==
=== First-team squad ===
Note: Flags indicate national team as defined under FIFA eligibility rules; some limited exceptions apply. Players may hold more than one non-FIFA nationality.

No.	Pos.	Nation	Player
3	DF	ARG	Javier Gandolfi (Captain)
4	DF	MEX	Jesús Chávez
5	DF	MEX	Elio Castro
6	MF	MEX	Javier Güemez
7	FW	ARG	Gabriel Hauche
8	FW	ECU	José Ayoví
9	FW	ARG	Alfredo Moreno
10	FW	BRA	Ricardo Jesús
11	FW	MEX	Henry Martín (on loan from Mérida)
13	GK	MEX	Cirilo Saucedo
15	MF	USA	Joe Corona
17	FW	COL	Dayro Moreno
18	MF	VEN	Juan Arango (Vice-captain)
20	MF	USA	Paul Arriola
21	DF	MEX	Óliver Ortíz
22	DF	MEX	Juan Carlos Núñez
23	MF	MEX	Richard Ruíz

No.	Pos.	Nation	Player
24	DF	USA	Greg Garza
25	GK	MEX	Gibrán Lajud (on loan from Cruz Azul)
26	DF	MEX	Javier Salas
27	MF	USA	Alejandro Guido
28	MF	MEX	Édgar Villegas
29	MF	MEX	Luis Chávez
30	FW	MEX	José Alberto García
31	MF	MEX	Pedro Hernández
32	MF	MEX	Luis García
33	MF	MEX	José Herrera
85	DF	USA	John Requejo
92	MF	USA	Fernando Arce Jr.
95	MF	USA	Amando Moreno
112	GK	MEX	Dilan Nicoletti

=== Regular season ===
Win Draw Loss

==== Clausura 2015 results ====
January 10, 2015 Round 1	Puebla	2 – 1	Club Tijuana	Puebla, Puebla
17:00				Stadium: Estadio Cuauhtémoc

January 16, 2015 round 2	Club Tijuana	1 – 0	América	Tijuana, Baja California
				Stadium: Estadio Caliente

January 24, 2015 round 3	Tigres UANL	1 – 2	Club Tijuana	San Nicolás de los Garza, Nuevo León
				Stadium: Estadio Universitario

January 30, 2015 round 4	Club Tijuana	4 – 2	Morelia	Tijuana, Baja California
				Stadium: Estadio Caliente

February 7, 2015 round 5	Jaguares	2 – 2	Club Tijuana	Tuxtla Gutierrez, Chiapas
				Stadium: Estadio Victor Manuel Reyna

February 13, 2015 round 6	Club Tijuana	3 – 0	UNAM	Tijuana, Baja California
				Stadium: Estadio Caliente

February 22, 2015 round 7	Leones Negros	0 – 1	Club Tijuana	Guadalajara, Jalisco
				Stadium: Estadio Jalisco

February 27, 2015 round 8	Club Tijuana	3 - 2	Pachuca	Tijuana, Baja California
				Stadium: Estadio Caliente

March 7, 2015 round 9	Santos	1 – 1	Club Tijuana	Torreón, Coahuila
				Stadium: Nuevo Estadio Corona

March 13, 2015 round 10	Club Tijuana	3 – 1	Veracruz	Tijuana, Baja California
				Stadium: Estadio Caliente

March 21, 2015 round 11	Cruz Azul	2 – 1	Club Tijuana	Mexico City
				Stadium: Estadio Azul

April 4, 2015 round 12	Club Tijuana	3 – 4	Monterrey	Tijuana, Baja California
				Stadium: Estadio Caliente

April 10, 2015 round 13	Queretaro	2 – 1	Club Tijuana	Querétaro, Querétaro
				Stadium: Estadio Corregidora

April 17, 2015 round 14	Club Tijuana	1 – 1	Guadalajara	Tijuana, Baja California
				Stadium: Estadio Caliente

April 26, 2015 round 15	Toluca	2 – 0	Tijuana	Toluca, Estado de México
				Stadium: Estadio Nemesio Diez

May 1, 2015 round 16	Tijuana	1 – 2	Atlas	Tijuana, Baja California
	Garza 44'		Barragán 53'; Caballero 70'	Stadium: Estadio Caliente

May 9, 2015 round 17	León	6 – 2	Club Tijuana	León, Guanajuato
				Stadium: Estadio Camp Nou

=== Goalscorers ===
==== Regular season ====
Position	Nation	Name	Goals scored
1.	(Colombia)	Dayro Moreno	8
2.	(Venezuela)	Juan Arango	6
3.	(Argentina)	Gabriel Hauche	4
4.	(Argentina)	Alfredo Moreno	3
5.	(Mexico)	Jesús Chavez	2
6.	(Brazil)	Ricardo Jesus	2
7.	(United States)	Gregory Garza	1
8.	(Mexico)	Henry Martín	1
9.	(Argentina)	Javier Gandolfi	1
10.	(Mexico)	Richard Ruiz	1
TOTAL			30

=== Results ===
==== Results summary ====
Overall								Home						Away					
Pld	W	D	L	GF	GA	GD	Pts	W	D	L	GF	GA	GD	W	D	L	GF	GA	GD
17	8	4	5	20	21	−1	28	3	2	3	11	14	−3	5	2	2	9	7	+2

Last updated: 20 May 2015.
Source: Clausura 2015 results

== Clausura 2015 Copa MX ==
=== Group stage ===
Win Draw Loss

==== Clausura results ====
21 January 2015 1	Tijuana	3–0; Awarded	Necaxa	Tijuana, Baja California
19:00	Corona 45'; Martín 72'; Guido 74'	Report	García 27'	Stadium: Estadio Caliente; Attendance: 21,333; Referee: Eduardo Galván Basulto

27 January 2015 2	Necaxa	1–3	Tijuana	Aguascalientes, Aguascalientes
19:00	Gallegos 28'	Report	Guido 11'; Villegas 84'; Martín 86'	Stadium: Estadio Victoria; Attendance: 4,926; Referee: Ángel Monroy Bello

February 4, 2015 3	Tijuana	3–2	Tepic	Tijuana, Baja California
19:00	A. Moreno 35'; Martín 68'; L. García 88'	Report	Fernando 17'; Mora 67'	Stadium: Estadio Caliente; Attendance: 18,633; Referee: José Alfredo Peñaloza

February 17, 2015 4	Tepic	2–2	Tijuana	Tepic, Nayarit
20:00	Pacheco 6'; Basulto 7'	Report	Moreno 3'; Salas 64'	Stadium: Arena Cora; Attendance: 4,177; Referee: Saúl Orozco

February 24, 2015 5	U. de G.	1–1	Tijuana	Guadalajara, Jalisco
21:00	Barraza 90+3'	Report	Martín 86'	Stadium: Estadio Jalisco; Attendance: 2,891; Referee: Roberto Ríos

3 March 2015 6	Tijuana	2–0	U. de G.	Tijuana, Baja California
19:00	Martín 13'; A. M. Moreno 59'	Report		Stadium: Estadio Jalisco; Attendance: 26,333; Referee: León Barajas

Note: Tijuana originally won the first leg 3–1 but Tijuana was later awarded a 3–0 win after Necaxa only had 6 registered Ascenso MX players available for the leg instead of the mandatory 8.

=== Quarter-finals ===
Win Draw Loss

==== Clausura results ====
11 March 2015 Quarterfinals	Tijuana	0–2	Chiapas	Estadio Caliente, Tijuana, Baja California
20:00		Report	Díaz 64' (pen.); Andrade 74'	Attendance: 26,333; Referee: Miguel Ángel Chacón

=== Goalscorers ===
Position	Nation	Name	Goals scored
1.	(Mexico) (United States)	Henry Martín	5
2.	(United States)	Alejandro Guido	2
3.	(United States)	Amando Moreno	2
4.	(United States)	Joe Corona	1
4.	(Mexico)	Javier Salas	1
4.	(Mexico)	Luis Eduardo García	1
4.	(Mexico)	Edgar Villegas	1
4.	(Argentina)	Alfredo Moreno	1
TOTAL			14
