= Erick Rivera =

Erick Rivera may refer to:

- Erick Rivera (footballer, born 1989), Salvadoran football forward
- Erick Rivera (footballer, born 1992), Mexican football midfielder
