= Joe Corona =

American soccer player (born 1990)

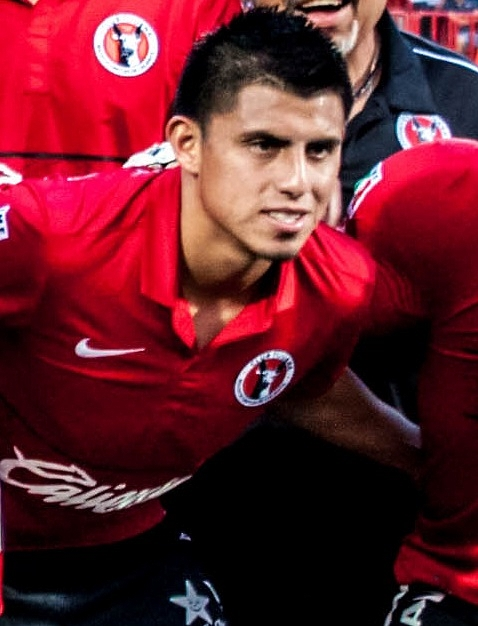
- Corona playing for Tijuana

Personal information
- Full name: Joe Benny Corona Crespín
- Date of birth: July 9, 1990 (age 36)
- Place of birth: Los Angeles, California, United States
- Height: 5 ft 8 in (1.72 m)
- Position: Midfielder

Youth career
- 2006–2008: Nomads SC
- 2009–2010: Tijuana

College career
Years	Team	Apps	(Gls)
2008	San Diego State Aztecs	15	(3)

Senior career*
Years	Team	Apps	(Gls)
2010–2019	Tijuana	185	(12)
2015	→ Veracruz (loan)	9	(0)
2016	→ Sinaloa (loan)	29	(0)
2018	→ América (loan)	26	(0)
2019–2020	LA Galaxy	47	(2)
2021–2022	Houston Dynamo	30	(0)
2022	→ GIF Sundsvall (loan)	25	(0)
2023	San Diego Loyal	32	(4)
2024–2026	Tijuana	26	(2)

International career^{‡}
2011	Mexico U22	1	(0)
2012	United States U23	4	(4)
2012–2018	United States	23	(3)
Medal record
Representing United States
Winner	CONCACAF Gold Cup	2013
Winner	CONCACAF Gold Cup	2017
- * Club domestic league appearances and goals as of March 16, 2025 ‡ National team caps and goals as of June 9, 2018

Joe Benny Corona Crespín (born July 9, 1990) is an American former professional soccer player who last played as a midfielder for Mexican club Tijuana.

== Youth and college ==
Corona began playing organized soccer at the age of 9. When Corona was 11, his family moved to San Diego, California. In San Diego, he spent time with youth soccer clubs Aztecs FC and Hotspurs USA FC before joining Nomads Soccer Club. Corona attended Sweetwater High School and played for the school soccer team for four years. During his senior season, Corona captained the team to a league championship and was named the 2008 San Diego Union-Tribune Player of the Year.

Corona received a partial scholarship to play college soccer at San Diego State University. During his freshman season, he had 3 goals and 1 assist in 15 games for the Aztecs. In 2009, ahead of his sophomore season, Corona's sister suffered a stroke. His parents had to take time off of work to take care of his sister and Corona was no longer able to afford SDSU due to the medical bills for his sister. Corona left San Diego State and began looking at community colleges so he could get a cheaper education and have time for a part-time job to help his family financially.

== Club career ==
=== Club Tijuana ===
After leaving San Diego State, one of Corona's friends encouraged him to attend an open tryout for Mexican side Club Tijuana who played in Liga de Ascenso at the time. He impressed during his tryout and began playing with the Xolos' reserves team. Although his parents wanted him to continue his education in the United States, Corona decided on pursuing a pro career with Tijuana.

After spending four months with the reserves, Corona was promoted to the Tijuana first team. On April 3, 2010, he made his debut for Xolos' first team, coming on as a substitute in a 3–2 loss to Club Necaxa in the Liga de Ascenso Clausura 2010. Corona made 3 appearances during his first season with the first team.

The 2010–11 season saw Corona establish himself in Tijuana first team. He scored his first professional goal on August 29, 2010, to help Xolos to a 2–0 win over Durango. Corona played in 15 of the 17 matches of the Apertura to help Tijuana finish top of the table and qualify for the Liguilla semifinals. Although he didn't feature in either leg of the semifinal, Corona started both legs of the final, helping Xolos beat Veracruz 3–0 on aggregate. For the 2011 Clausura season, Corona scored 3 goals in 15 appearances as Tijuana finished 4th in the Table. He played in all 6 of Xolos' games in Liguilla, scoring once, as Tijuana reached the final, where they lost 2–1 to C.D. Irapuato over two legs. Since the Apertura and Clausura had different championships, a Promotion Final was held between Tijuana and Irapuato. Corona didn't feature in the first leg, a 0–0 draw. In leg 2, Corona had a goal and an assist to help Xolos to a 2–1 victory, earning Tijuana promotion to the top flight for the first time in club history.

On July 23, 2011, in the first game of the 2011 Apertura, Corona scored Tijuana's first ever goal in the Primera División in a 2–1 defeat to Monarcas Morelia. He scored again in Xolos' second game of the season, a 4–2 loss to Monterrey. Corona ended the Apertura with 2 goals from 13 games as Tijuana finished 15th in the table. Following the 2011 Apertura, Corona was named the Newcomer of the Year for the Mexican top flight. In the 2012 Clausura, he scored twice in 14 appearances, helping Xolos finish 7th and qualify for Liguilla. Corona started both legs of their quarterfinal matchup with Monterrey, but Tijuana lost 4–3 on aggregate. Corona ended his first season in the top flight with 4 goals in 29 appearances.

In the 2012–13 season, Corona played in 14 of the 17 games during the 2012 Apertura season as Tijuana finished 2nd in the table. Although he didn't appear in the quarterfinals, Corona started both games against Club León in the semifinal as Xolos advanced 3–2 on aggregate. Facing off with Deportivo Toluca in the final, Corona started both legs to help Tijuana win 4–1 on aggregate and win the Apertura 2012 title. Corona made 14 appearances in the 2013 Clausura as Tijuana finished 10th in the table, missing out on Liguilla. During the 2013 Clausura, Tijuana also took part in the 2013 Copa Libertadores. Corona scored once and made 7 appearances in the tournament as Xolos reached the quarterfinals where they lost to eventual champions Atlético Mineiro. Across all competitions, Corona made 41 appearances and scored one goal during the 2012–13 season.

In Apertura 2013, Corona made 7 appearances as Tijuana finished 10th in the table, missing out on the Liguilla. For Clausura 2014, Corona made 12 appearances to help Xolos finish 7th in the standings. Facing off with Toluca in the Liguilla quarterfinals, Corona came on as a substitute in both legs as Toluca won 3–1 on aggregate. During the 2013–14 season Tijuana also competed in the 2013–14 CONCACAF Champions League. Corona played in all 8 of Tijuana's games as Xolos reached the semifinals, where they lost to eventual champions Cruz Azul.

During the 2014–15 season, Corona made 13 appearances during the 2014 Liga MX Apertura as Xolos failed to qualify for Liguilla, finishing 11th. He missed the final month of the Apertura after breaking his fifth metatarsal. During the Apertura Copa MX, Corona played in 3 matches and scored a goal, coming on July 29, 2014, in a 3–1 win over Zacatepec, however Xolos did not advance past the group stage. He recovered from his broken foot and returned to the field on January 21 in a Clausura Copa MX match, scoring once on a 3–1 win over Necaxa. However the match would later be awarded as a 3–0 win to Tijuana due to Necaxa fielding an ineligible lineup, meaning the goal did not count. Corona made 3 appearances in the tournament as Tijuana won the group, but they lost to Chiapas F.C. in the quarterfinals. For the 2015 Liga MX Clausura, Corona played 15 times for Xolos, however they finished in 11th and missed out on Liguilla.

==== Loan to Veracruz ====
On June 10, 2015, Corona was loaned to C.D. Veracruz ahead of the 2015 Apertura season. He made his debut for Los Tiburones Rojos on August 1 in a 4–1 loss to Club León. In Liga MX play, Corona made 9 appearances and recorded 2 assists to help Veracruz finish 8th and qualify for Liguilla, however he did not appear in the playoffs. He also made 4 appearances in the Apertura 2015 Copa MX to help Veracruz reach the quarterfinals, where they lost on penalties to eventual champion Guadalajara.

==== Loan to Dorados de Sinaloa ====
Ahead of the 2016 Clausura, Corona was loaned to Dorados de Sinaloa on December 16, 2015. He made his Dorados debut on January 9, 2016, in the opening match of Clausura play, a 1–0 loss to Chiapas. He made 7 league appearances for Dorados as they finished 16th for the Clausura table. They were also relegated after having the lowest points per game over the previous 3 seasons. Corona also made 5 appearances in the Copa MX Clausura for Dorados.

Corona remained with Dorados for the 2016 Apertura season. He made 16 appearances as Dorados finished 5th in the league table. Corona started all 6 games of the Liguilla to help Dorados reach the final, where they beat Atlante 4–2 on aggregate to become Ascenso MX Apertura 2016 Champions.

==== Return to Tijuana ====
Ahead of the 2017 Clausura, Corona returned to Club Tijuana and signed a contract extension. On January 13, Corona scored to help Xolos defeat Puebla 6–2 in matchweek 2. He scored again on April 21 as Tijauna won 2–0 against Toluca. Corona ended the season with 2 goals and 2 assists from 16 appearances to help finish top of the Clausura table. He made 3 appearances and had 1 assist in Liguilla as Xolos reached the semifinals, where they lost to Tigres UANL. Corona also played 4 times in the Copa MX as Xolos advanced to the Quarterfinals before falling to Monarcas Morelia.

For Apertura 2017, Corona made 11 league appearances, however Tijuana failed to qualify for the Liguilla after finishing 11th in the table. He also made 3 appearances in Copa MX Apertura to help Xolos reach the quarterfinals, where they lost to Pachuca.

==== Loan to Club América ====
On December 13, 2017, Corona joined Club América on a year-long loan deal. He made his debut for Las Águilas on January 7, 2018, in matchweek 1 of the 2018 Clausura, getting the start as América defeated Querétaro 1–0. He played 15 times during the season, helping América finish 2nd in the Clausura standings. Corona played once during the Liguilla as Las Águilas fell to eventual champions Santos Laguna in the semifinals. During the Clausura season, América also competed in the 2018 CONCACAF Champions League. On March 6, Corona scored his first goal for Las Águilas, rocketing the ball into the top right corner from 22 yards out off a half volley in a 4–0 win over Tauro. The goal was later named the CONCACAF Goal of the Year. In total, he played in 5 of América's 6 matches in CCL as they reached the semifinals, where they lost to Toronto FC 4–2 on aggregate.

During the 2018 Apertura season, Corona did not feature much in Liga MX play during the regular season, making only 5 appearances out of a possible 17. However he was more involved in the Liguilla, appearing in 5 out of a possible 6 games to help América reach the final, where they defeated Cruz Azul 2–0 on aggregate to win the 2018 Apertura championship.

==== Second return to Tijuana ====
After winning the 2018 Apertura with América, Corona returned to Club Tijuana for the 2019 Clausura season. He made 3 appearances in Liga MX and 3 in the Copa MX before being sold to the LA Galaxy.

=== LA Galaxy ===
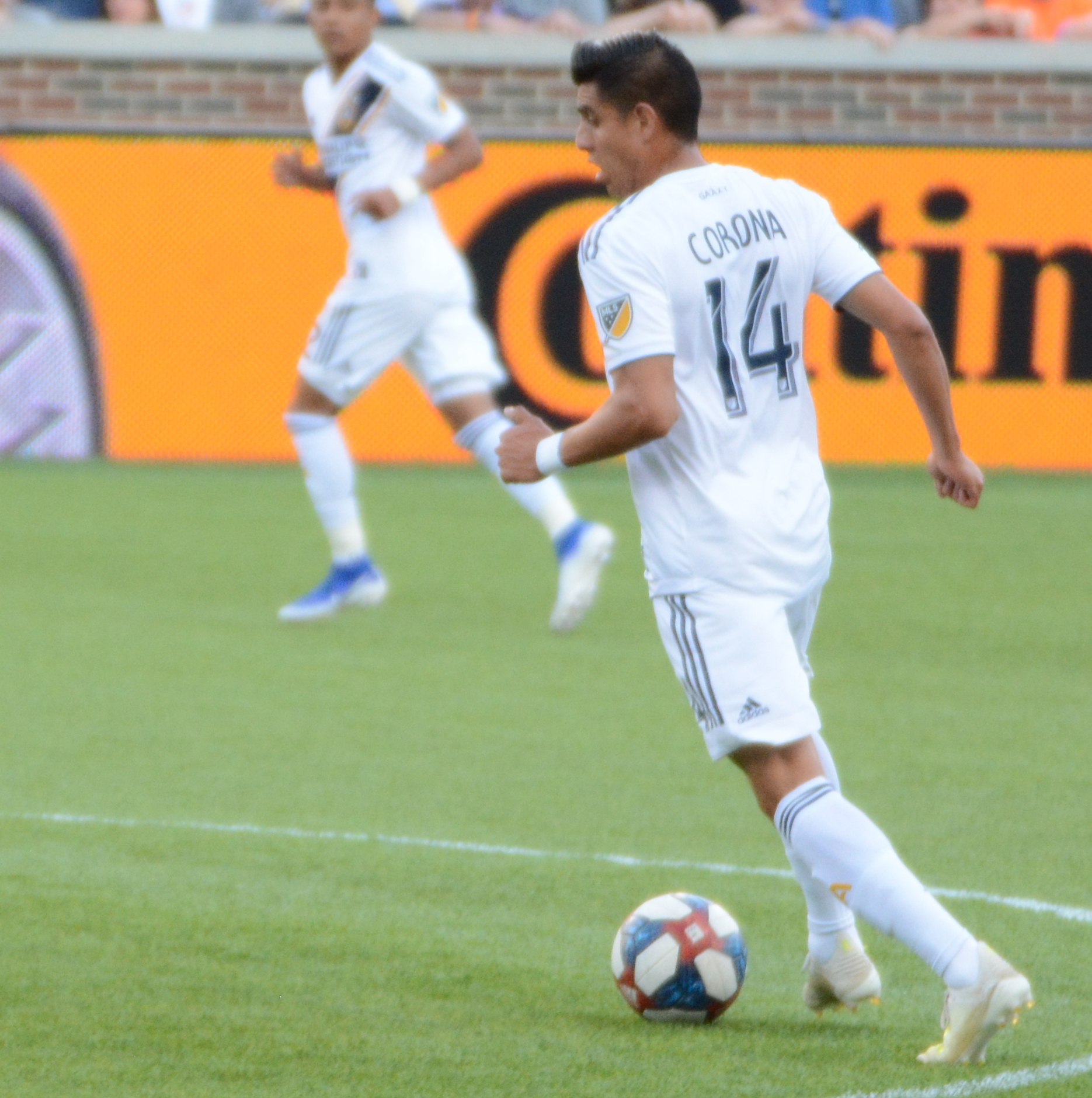
Corona with LA Galaxy in 2019

On March 6, 2019, Corona signed for MLS side LA Galaxy. He made his Galaxy debut on March 9, playing the full 90 minutes in a 2–0 loss to FC Dallas. He scored his first goal for Los Angeles on September 15 to help the Galaxy defeat Sporting Kansas City 7–2. Corona ended his first season with the Galaxy with 1 goal and 3 assists from 31 regular season appearances, helping the Galaxy qualify for the playoffs after finishing 5th in the Western Conference. Corona did not make an appearance in either of the Galaxy's 2 playoff games.

On September 2, 2020, Corona scored his first goal of the 2020 season to help the Galaxy defeat the Portland Timbers 3–2. Following the match, he was named to the MLS Team of the Week. During a shortened season due to the COVID-19 pandemic, Corona played in 16 of a possible 23 games for the Galaxy. It was a poor season for LA, as they finished 10th in the conference and missed out on the playoffs.

On November 30, 2020, the Galaxy declined Corona's contract option. On December 15, he was selected in the 2020 MLS Expansion Draft by Austin FC, giving Austin exclusive rights among MLS clubs to negotiate with him. On December 22 Corona was selected by the Houston Dynamo in Stage Two of the 2020 MLS Re-Entry Draft, acquiring his rights from Austin. In the week between the drafts, Austin and Corona were unable to come to an agreement. Corona could have opted out of the Re-Entry draft, but decided to remain eligible.

=== Houston Dynamo ===
On December 31, 2020, Corona signed a contract with the Houston Dynamo until 2022 with a team option for 2023. On April 16, Corona made his Dynamo debut in the opening match of the 2021 season, starting and recording an assist in a 2–1 win over the San Jose Earthquakes. He ended the season with 30 appearances and 2 assists as Houston finished last in the Western Conference, failing to qualify for the playoffs. Corona was waived by Houston on February 21, 2022, just prior to the start of the 2022 season.

==== Loan to GIF Sundsvall ====
As Corona's contract was guaranteed, and he was not selected by other clubs in the waiver process, the contract remained with Houston Dynamo, according to MLS rules. On March 29, 2022, Dynamo announced his loan to GIF Sundsvall in Sweden for the rest of 2022.

=== San Diego Loyal ===
On January 18, 2023, Corona signed with his hometown club, San Diego Loyal of the USL Championship.

== International career ==
Due to Corona's birth and his parents being of both Mexican and Salvadoran nationality, he was eligible to represent the United States, Mexico, or El Salvador. In May 2011, El Salvador head coach Rubén Israel approached Corona about representing El Salvador, but Corona declined in favor of representing the U.S. or Mexico. He was named to the preliminary roster to represent the United States in a friendly match against Mexico in August 2011 under Bob Bradley, but Bradley was fired before the official roster was announced. Corona later accepted a call-up to represent Mexico in a two-legged friendly series against Chile's U22 squad in preparation for the 2011 Pan American Games. Corona only played in the second game and this did not tie him to play for the Mexican team, as the game was not an official FIFA match. Corona did not make the final cut for Mexico's Pan American Games squad and later accepted a call up to the United States U-23 team.

Corona recorded a hat trick in the Olympic qualifying match in a 6–0 victory over Cuba. In the final group stage match, Corona scored to give the Americans a 3–2 lead over El Salvador; however, a late El Salvador goal earned a draw and eliminated the Americans from contention for the 2012 Olympic Games.

In May 2012, United States men's national soccer team head coach Jürgen Klinsmann called up Corona to senior team. On May 26, 2012, Corona made his debut for the senior national team in a friendly against Scotland, coming on in the 68th minute as a sub. On October 16, 2012, Corona made his first official appearance, coming on as a sub in a 2014 World Cup qualifying match against Guatemala, permanently cap-tying him.

On June 27, 2013, Corona was selected to the USMNT 23-man squad for the 2013 CONCACAF Gold Cup by Klinsmann. On July 13, Corona scored his first goal for the national team to help the U.S. defeat Cuba 4–1. He appeared in 5 of the team's 6 games and scored 2 goals to help the U.S. win the 2013 Gold Cup.

After missing out on the initial 23-man roster for the 2015 CONCACAF Gold Cup, Klinnsman added Corona to the squad as one of the 6 allowed replacement players following the group stage. Corona played in 2 of the 3 games while part of the team as the U.S. finished 4th at the tournament, losing in the 3rd place match to Panama.

On June 25, 2017, Corona was named in the 23-man squad for the 2017 CONCACAF Gold Cup by head coach Bruce Arena. Corona played twice and scored once during the tournament, both during the group stage, to the USMNT win 2017 Gold Cup.

== Personal life ==
Corona is of Mexican and Salvadoran descent. His mother was born in El Salvador (Yanira Crespín), and his father in Mexico (Angel Corona). He has one sibling, a sister named Miriam. He was born in Los Angeles, California, and when he was 3 his family moved to Tijuana, Baja California, Mexico. When he was 9, the Corona family moved to San Diego, California, United States, just over 30 miles north of Tijuana. In San Diego, Corona graduated from Sweetwater High School in National City, CA. After finishing high school, he received a partial scholarship to attend San Diego State University.

He is married to Ana Melissa Valadez and they have a daughter Isabel born on July 4, 2024.

== Career statistics ==
=== Club ===
As of March 12, 2023

Appearances and goals by club, season and competition
Club	Season	League			National cup (Note: Includes Copa MX, U.S. Open Cup and Svenska Cupen)		Continental		Other		Total	
Club	Season	Division	Apps	Goals	Apps	Goals	Apps	Goals	Apps	Goals	Apps	Goals
Club Tijuana	2009–10	Liga de Ascenso	3	0	—		—		—		3	0
Club Tijuana	2010–11	Liga de Ascenso	39	6	—		—		—		39	6
Club Tijuana	2011–12	Primera División	29	4	—		—		—		29	4
Club Tijuana	2012–13	Liga MX	32	0	2	0	7 (Note: Appearances in Copa Libertadores)	1	—		41	1
Club Tijuana	2013–14	Liga MX	21	0	—		8 (Note: Appearance(s) in CONCACAF Champions League)	0	—		29	0
Club Tijuana	2014–15	Liga MX	28	0	6	1	—		—		34	1
Club Tijuana	2016–17	Liga MX	19	2	4	0	—		—		23	2
Club Tijuana	2017–18	Liga MX	11	0	3	0	—		—		14	0
Club Tijuana	2018–19	Liga MX	3	0	3	0	—		—		6	0
Club Tijuana	Total		185	12	18	1	15	1	—		218	14
Veracruz (loan)	2015–16	Liga MX	9	0	4	0	—		—		13	0
Dorados de Sinaloa (loan)	2015–16	Liga MX	7	0	5	0	—		—		12	0
Dorados de Sinaloa (loan)	2016–17	Ascenso MX	22	0	—		—		—		22	0
Dorados de Sinaloa (loan)	Total		29	0	5	0	—		—		34	0
Club América (loan)	2017–18	Liga MX	16	0	—		5	1	—		21	1
Club América (loan)	2018–19	Liga MX	10	0	5	0	—		—		15	0
Club América (loan)	Total		26	0	5	0	5	1	—		36	1
LA Galaxy	2019	Major League Soccer	31	1	1	0	1 (Note: Appearance in Leagues Cup)	0	—		33	1
LA Galaxy	2020	Major League Soccer	16	1	—		—		—		16	1
LA Galaxy	Total		47	2	1	0	1	0	—		49	2
Houston Dynamo	2021	Major League Soccer	30	0	—		—		—		30	0
GIF Sundsvall (loan)	2022	Allsvenskan	25	0	1	0	—		—		26	0
Career total			351	14	34	1	21	2	0	0	406	17

=== International ===
As of match played December 31, 2020

National team	Year	Apps	Goals
United States	2012	3	0
United States	2013	8	2
United States	2014	3	0
United States	2015	3	0
United States	2016	0	0
United States	2017	3	1
United States	2018	3	0
Total		23	3

International goals

Scores and results list the United States' goal tally first.

As of July 15, 2017

No	Date	Venue	Opponent	Score	Result	Competition
1.	July 13, 2013	Rio Tinto Stadium, Sandy, United States	Cuba	2–1	4–1	2013 CONCACAF Gold Cup
2.	July 21, 2013	M&T Bank Stadium, Baltimore, United States	El Salvador	2–0	5–1	2013 CONCACAF Gold Cup
3.	July 15, 2017	FirstEnergy Stadium, Cleveland, United States	Nicaragua	1–0	3–0	2017 CONCACAF Gold Cup

== Honors ==
Tijuana

- Liga MX: Apertura 2012
- Liga de Ascenso: Apertura 2010
- Promotional Final: Campeón de Ascenso 2010–11

Dorados de Sinaloa

- Ascenso MX: Apertura 2016

América

- Liga MX: Apertura 2018

United States

- CONCACAF Gold Cup: 2013, 2017

Individual

- CONCACAF Goal of the Year: 2018
- Primera División Rookie of the Season: Apertura 2011
