= Eduardo Chávez (footballer) =

Mexican footballer (born 1987)

Personal information
- Full name: Eduardo Chávez Hernández
- Date of birth: 25 January 1987 (age 39)
- Place of birth: Los Reyes, Michoacán, Mexico
- Height: 1.74 m (5 ft 8 1/2 in)
- Position: Defender

Senior career*
Years	Team	Apps	(Gls)
2007–2013	Chiapas	23	(0)
2011	→ Atlante B (loan)	12	(0)
2011–2012	→ Toros Neza (loan)	18	(0)
2013–2014	Oaxaca	16	(0)
2014–2015	Altamira	25	(0)
2015–2016	Correcaminos	30	(0)
2016–2018	Morelia	0	(0)
- * Club domestic league appearances and goals

Eduardo Chávez Hernández (born 25 January 1987) is a Mexican former football defender.
