= Leonardo Bedolla =

Mexican footballer (born 1993)

Personal information
- Full name: Leonardo Bedolla Torres
- Date of birth: 31 July 1993 (age 33)
- Place of birth: Ayutla, Jalisco, Mexico
- Height: 1.75 m (5 ft 9 in)
- Position: Defender

Youth career
- 2009–2012: Jaguares de Chiapas

Senior career*
Years	Team	Apps	(Gls)
2012–2013	Jaguares de Chiapas	23	(1)
2013–2014	Delfines del Carmen	24	(2)
2014–2016	Sinaloa	5	(0)
2016	→ Tijuana Premier (loan)	5	(0)
2016	UAT	1	(0)
2017	Pioneros de Cancún	16	(0)
2017	Tuxtla	11	(0)
2019	CAFESSA Jalisco	3	(0)
- * Club domestic league appearances and goals as of 25 January 2020

Leonardo Bedolla Torres (born July 31, 1993), known as Leonardo Torres, is a professional Mexican football.
