= Édgar Villegas =

Mexican footballer (born 1994)

Edgar Villegas
Personal information
- Full name: Edgar Villegas Arce
- Date of birth: 24 November 1994 (age 31)
- Place of birth: Tijuana, Baja California, Mexico
- Height: 1.69 m (5 ft 7 in)
- Position: Midfielder

Youth career
- 2011–2015: Club Tijuana

Senior career*
Years	Team	Apps	(Gls)
2013–2015	Club Tijuana	6	(0)
2013–2014	→Dorados de Sinaloa (loan)	3	(0)
2016–2017	Mineros de Zacatecas	19	(0)
2017	→Irapuato F.C. (loan)	5	(2)
2017	→Celaya C.D. (loan)	5	(0)
2018	Atlético Reynosa	16	(6)
2018–2019	Real Zamora	24	(6)
- * Club domestic league appearances and goals as of November 6, 2017

Edgar Villegas Arce (born November 24, 1994) is a Mexican professional footballer who last played for Real Zamora.
