= Erick Rivera (footballer, born 1992) =

Mexican footballer

Personal information
- Full name: Erick Rivera Guerrero
- Date of birth: 15 November 1992 (age 33)
- Place of birth: Arriaga, Chiapas, Mexico
- Height: 1.61 m (5 ft 3 in)
- Position: Midfielder

Team information
- Current team: Cafetaleros de Tapachula
- Number: 29

Youth career
- 2009–2013: Chiapas F.C.

Senior career*
Years	Team	Apps	(Gls)
2013–2016	Chiapas F.C.	0	(0)
2013	→Atlético Chiapas (loan)	13	(0)
2014	→Irapuato F.C. (loan)	7	(0)
2014–2015	→Atlético Chiapas (loan)	19	(0)
2015	→Real Cuautitlán (loan)	4	(0)
2017–	Cafetaleros de Tapachula	2	(0)
- * Club domestic league appearances and goals as of September 23, 2017

Erick Rivera Guerrero (born 15 November 1992) is a Mexican footballer who plays as a midfielder for Cafetaleros de Tapachula.
