= Julio César Pardini =

Mexican footballer (born 1984)

Julio César Pardini Sandoval (born April 25, 1984, in Guasave, Sinaloa) is a Mexican former professional footballer who played in the forward position for Cafetaleros de Tapachula of Ascenso MX.

== Honours ==
=== Club ===
Herediano

- Liga FPD: 2017 Verano
