= Pedro Hernández (footballer, born 1993) =

Mexican footballer (born 1993)

Pedro Hernández Franco (born 27 August 1993) is a Mexican former professional footballer who played as a midfielder.
