= Leiton Jiménez =

Colombian footballer (born 1989)

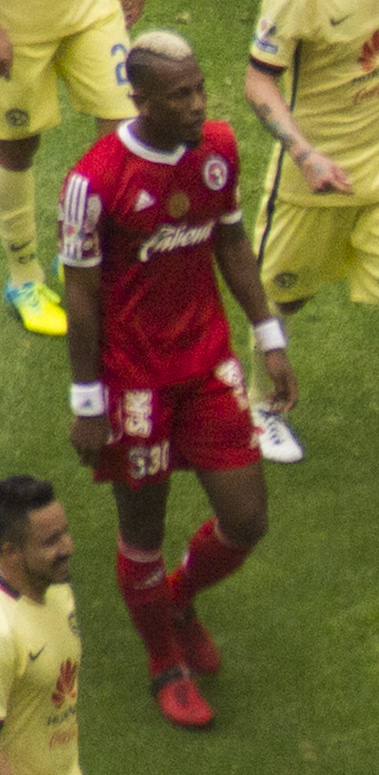

Personal information
- Full name: Leiton Jiménez Romero
- Date of birth: 26 April 1989 (age 37)
- Place of birth: Chocó, Colombia
- Height: 1.80 m (5 ft 11 in)
- Position: Center back

Senior career*
Years	Team	Apps	(Gls)
2009–2012	Independiente Medellín	77	(2)
2012–2013	Chiapas	25	(3)
2013–2015	Veracruz	57	(6)
2015–2016	Tijuana	26	(0)
2016–2018	Atlas	49	(1)
2019	Lobos BUAP	7	(0)
2019	Veracruz	2	(0)
2020	Correcaminos UAT	5	(0)
2021	Independiente Medellín	2	(0)
- * Club domestic league appearances and goals as of 15 July 2023

Leiton Jiménez Romero (born 26 April 1989) is a Colombian footballer who played as a centre back. He also holds Mexican citizenship.
