= Fidel Martínez =

Ecuadorian footballer (born 1990)

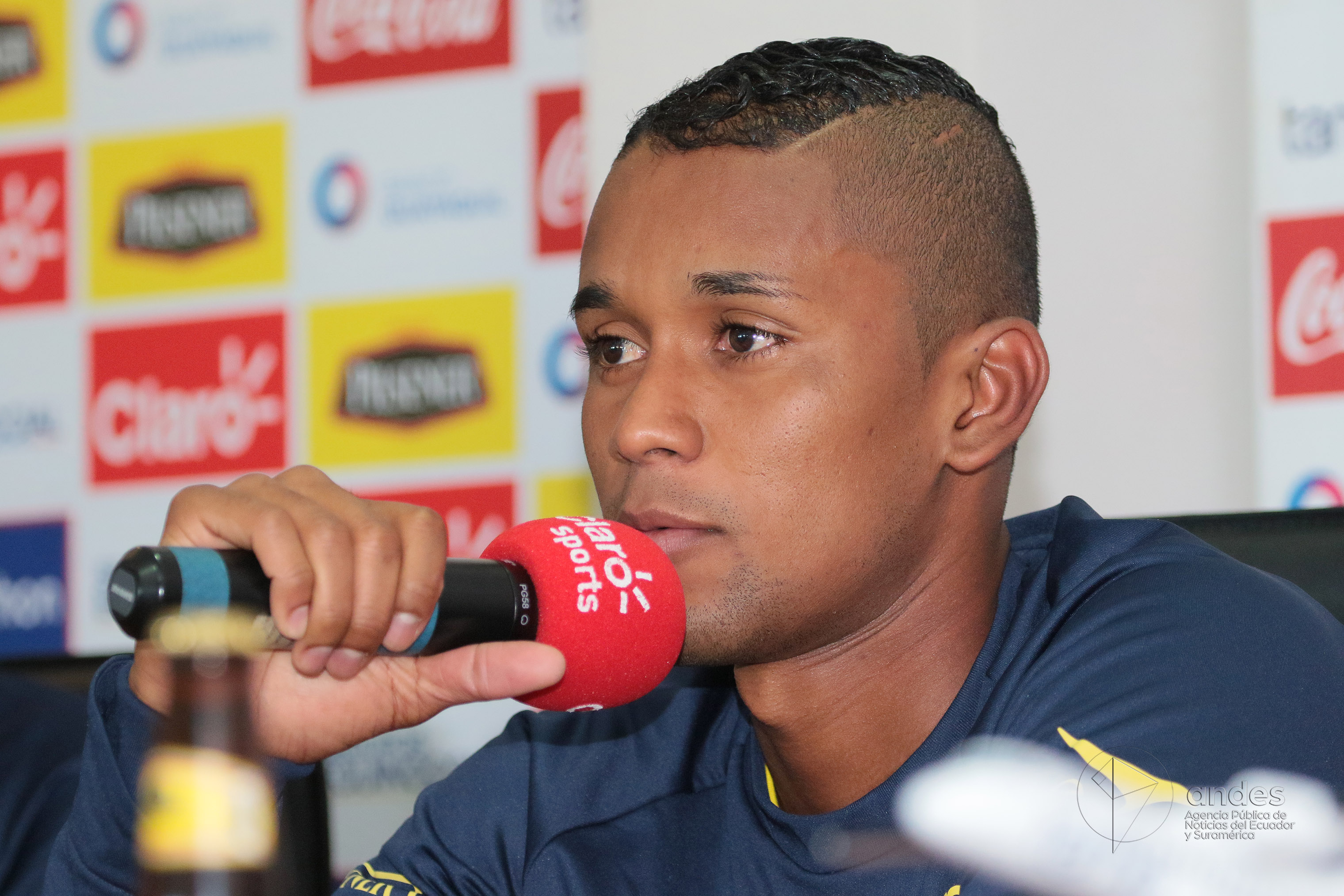
- Martínez in 2015

Personal information
- Full name: Fidel Francisco Martínez Tenorio
- Date of birth: 15 February 1990 (age 36)
- Place of birth: Nueva Loja, Sucumbíos Province, Ecuador
- Height: 1.76 m (5 ft 9 in)
- Position: Winger

Team information
- Current team: Atlético F.C.
- Number: 10

Youth career
- 2002–2007: Caribe Junior
- 2008: Independiente DV
- 2008–2009: Cruzeiro

Senior career*
Years	Team	Apps	(Gls)
2010–2012	Deportivo Quito	60	(15)
2012–2014	Tijuana	79	(21)
2014–2015	→ Leones Negros (loan)	33	(11)
2015–2016	Pumas UNAM	68	(14)
2016–2018	Atlas	27	(5)
2018	→ Peñarol (loan)	18	(4)
2019–2020	Barcelona SC	33	(19)
2020	Shanghai Shenhua	4	(1)
2021–2023	Tijuana	31	(9)
2022	→ Querétaro (loan)	3	(0)
2022–2023	→ Barcelona S.C. (loan)	15	(5)
2023–2024	Barcelona S.C.	10	(2)
2024–2025	C.D. El Nacional	28	(4)
2025	Sport Boys	10	(1)
2026–	Atlético FC	0	(0)

International career
2007	Ecuador U17	2	(0)
2009	Ecuador U20	2	(0)
2008–2021	Ecuador	36	(8)
Medal record
Representing Ecuador
Men's Football
Pan American Games
Gold medal – first place	2007 Rio de Janeiro	Team competition
- * Club domestic league appearances and goals as of 30 December 2025

Fidel Francisco Martínez Tenorio (born 15 February 1990) is an Ecuadorian footballer who plays as a winger for Atlético F.C. and the Ecuador national team.

== Club career ==
=== Youth club career ===
Martínez started his career with Caribe Junior, where the Ecuadorian star played during his youth years. He showed his skills in the 2007 Pan American Games held in Brazil, where the Ecuadorian team won the gold medal, with Martínez a key player. Independiente José Terán acquired his services and then sold him to Cruzeiro for an unknown fee.

=== Associação Atlética Caldense ===
In 2009 Martínez was loaned to Associação Atlética Caldense where he played the Mineiro championship.

=== Deportivo Quito ===
==== 2010 season ====
After a move to Deportivo Quito, Martínez debuted on 16 October 2010 against El Nacional. He scored his only goal of the season against ESPOLI. Martínez finished his debut season with nine games, one goal and one assist.

==== 2011 season ====
Martínez played in thirty games in 2011, assisting five times and scoring nine goals, one of which was in the first leg of the Serie A final against Emelec. Martínez scored his first goal of the 2011 season on 14 May, against Quito club Espoli. He would go on to score seven more league goals, including a vital finish past the Emelec goalkeeper, as his side became champions of the 2011 season.

==== 2012 season ====
Martínez kicked off the 2012 season against Macara. On 7 February 2012, he played his first ever Copa Libertadores match against Guadalajara. On 7 March, Martínez scored his first ever goal in the tournament against Velez Sarsfield in an emphatic 3–0 win over the Argentine team. On 11 March, he scored his first league goal against Deportivo Cuenca in a 4–1 away win. On 17 April, Martínez played a vital game against Mexican giants Guadalajara in a historic 5–0 win, scoring the third goal in the 65th minute. Martínez played all six games of the 2012 Copa Libertadores group stage, contributing two goals and two assists to help Deportivo Quito qualify to the last 16, an accomplishment not achieved since the 1989 Copa Libertadores. He scored his third Copa Libertadores goal in the round of 16 against powerful Chilean club Universidad de Chile in a 4–1 win.

=== Tijuana ===
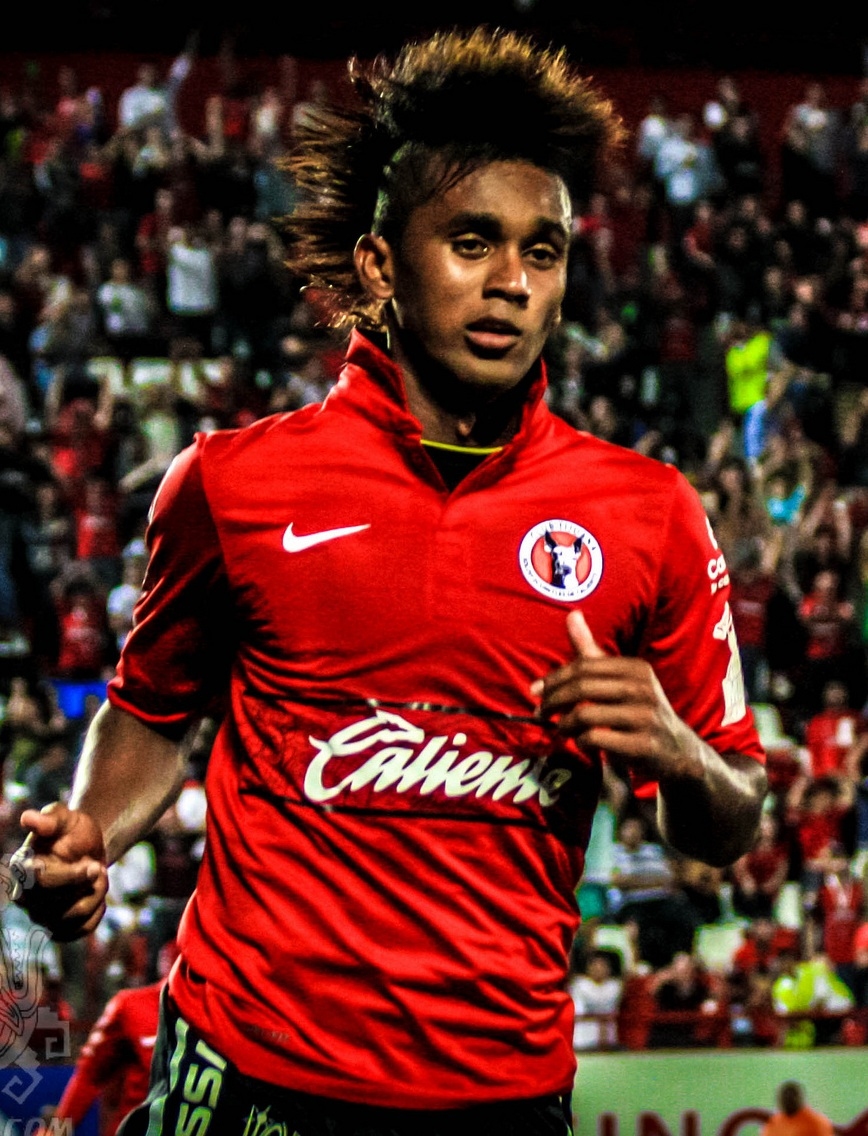
Martínez playing for Tijuana in 2012.

==== 2012–13 season ====
On 22 May 2012, president of Deportivo Quito Fernando Mantilla confirmed the purchase of Martínez by Mexican side Tijuana for an undisclosed fee. Martínez made his professional debut with Xolos on 20 July, coming on as a substitute in a 2–0 win over Puebla. Martínez scored his first goal for the club in a Copa MX match against Pumas, in a 2–2 away draw. On 2 December, Martínez and Tijuana won their first ever first division league title, with Martínez assisting both goals in Tijuana's 2–0 away victory over Toluca. Martínez scored his goal of the year in a 4–0 Copa Libertadores win against San Jose of Bolivia, while also assisting one goal. He later scored a late winner against Colombia's Millonarios in the last minute, and against Brazilian giants Atlético Mineiro in a 2–2 home draw, scoring a total of four goals in ten Copa Libertadores games played.

==== 2013–14 season ====
For the 2013–14 Liga MX season, Martínez was given the club's number 10 jersey. On 4 August, Martínez scored his first goal of the season, in a 1–2 loss to Monarcas Morelia. A week later on 10 August, he scored his second, in a 2–0 home win over Pumas. On 23 August he scored his third goal, in a 1–1 home draw against Santos Laguna. On 9 August, Martínez scored his first ever CONCACAF Champions League goal in a group match against Firpo, winning 1–0. On 7 September, Martínez scored his first brace of the season in a 3–0 home win over Veracruz. On 16 September, he scored in a 2–2 away draw against Guadalajara. On 4 October, he scored the winning goal in a 1–0 home win over Querétaro.

=== Leones Negros UdeG ===
==== 2014–15 Season ====
On 4 June 2014, Martínez joined Leones Negros UdeG on loan from Tijuana.

On 20 August 2014, Martínez scored and gave Leones Negros their first Liga MX victory in over 20 years in a win against León.

On 29 August, Martínez scored against his former team Tijuana as the match ended a 1–1 draw. On 12 January 2015, Martínez scored his first goal of the year in a 1–0 win against Monterrey.

==== Pumas UNAM ====
On 24 May 2015, Martínez joined UNAM. He enjoyed a good first year with Pumas, registering four goals and six assists in the regular season. As Pumas advanced to the Ligilla, Martinez scored in the quarter-finals to give his side a 1–0 win over Veracruz and advance them to the semi-finals. Martinez started the Clausura 2016 tournament having lost his regular starting spot to new signing Luis Quinones; despite limited game time Martínez scored a last minute equaliser in a 1–1 draw away to Atlas.

== International career ==
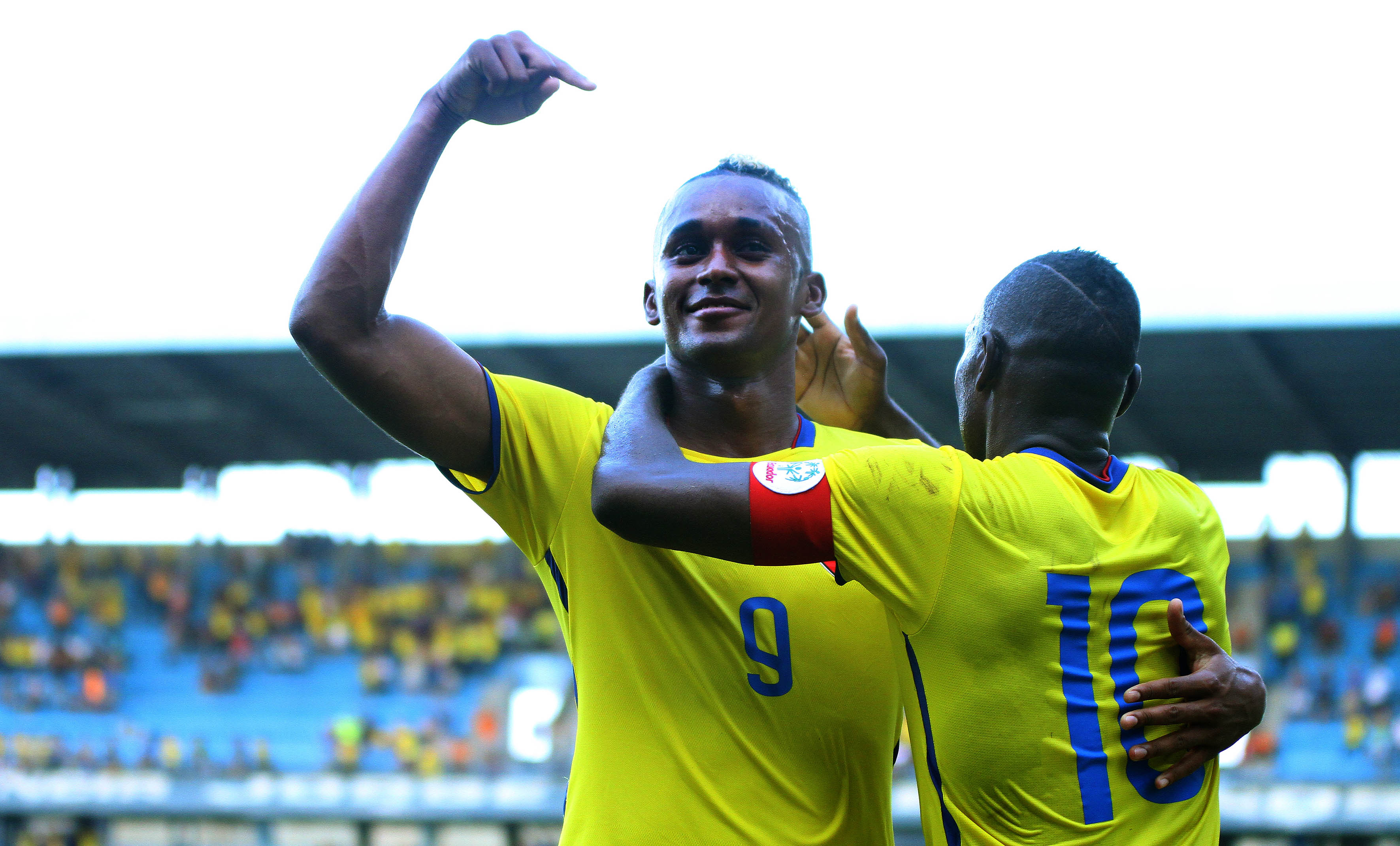
Martínez celebrating scoring a goal for Ecuador in a match against Panama.

Martínez was called up for the Ecuador senior team in 2008, debuting on 17 December in a tournament in Oman, scoring the winning goal against Iran. He was called up to play in the 2009 South American Youth Championship. After a five-year absence from the national team, Martínez was called up by Reinaldo Rueda for 2014 FIFA World Cup qualification matches against Uruguay and Chile.

== Career statistics ==
=== Club ===
As of 6 February 2017.

Club	Season	League			Cup		Continental		Total	
Club	Season	Division	Apps	Goals	Apps	Goals	Apps	Goals	Apps	Goals
Deportivo Quito	2010	Serie A	9	1	–		0	0	9	1
Deportivo Quito	2011	Serie A	30	9	–		2	0	32	9
Deportivo Quito	2012	Serie A	11	2	–		8	3	19	5
Deportivo Quito	Total		50	12	–		10	3	60	15
Tijuana	2012–13	Liga MX	23	4	7	2	10	4	40	10
Tijuana	2013–14	Liga MX	33	10	0	0	6	1	39	11
Tijuana	Total		56	14	7	2	16	5	79	21
Leones Negros	2014–15	Liga MX	31	10	2	1	0	0	33	11
Leones Negros	Total		31	10	2	1	0	0	33	11
UNAM	2015–16	Liga MX	38	7	0	0	9	3	47	10
UNAM	2016 Apertura	Liga MX	19	2	0	0	2	2	21	4
UNAM	Total		57	9	0	0	11	5	68	14
Atlas	2017 Clausura	Liga MX	5	1	0	0	0	0	5	1
Atlas	Total		5	1	0	0	0	0	5	1
Career total			199	46	9	3	37	13	245	62

=== International ===
As of 23 June 2021.

Ecuador
Year	Apps	Goals
2008	2	1
2013	3	0
2014	5	1
2015	12	5
2016	7	0
2017	1	0
2021	6	1
Total	36	8

==== International goals ====
Scores and results list Ecuador's goal tally first.

No.	Date	Venue	Opponent	Score	Result	Competition
1.	17 December 2008	Sultan Qaboos Sports Complex, Muscat, Oman	Iran	1–0	1–0	Friendly
2.	5 March 2014	The Den, London, England	Australia	1–3	4–3	Friendly
3.	3 June 2015	Estadio Rommel Fernandez, Panama City, Panama	Panama	1–0	1–1	Friendly
4.	6 June 2015	Estadio George Capwell, Guayaquil, Ecuador	Panama	2–0	4–0	Friendly
5.	6 June 2015	Estadio George Capwell, Guayaquil, Ecuador	Panama	3–0	4–0	Friendly
6.	12 November 2015	Estadio Olímpico Atahualpa, Quito, Ecuador	Uruguay	2–1	2–1	2018 FIFA World Cup qualification
7.	17 November 2015	Polideportivo Cachamay, Ciudad Guayana, Venezuela	Venezuela	1–0	3–1	2018 FIFA World Cup qualification
8.	29 March 2021	Estadio Monumental Banco Pichincha, Guayaquil, Ecuador	Bolivia	1–0	2–1	Friendly

== Honours ==
=== Club ===
Deportivo Quito

- Serie A: 2011

Tijuana

- Liga MX: Apertura 2012

=== International ===
Ecuador U-20

- Pan American Games: 2007 Gold Medal

=== Individual ===
- Copa Libertadores Top scorer: 2020
