= Edgar Castillo =

American soccer player (born 1986)

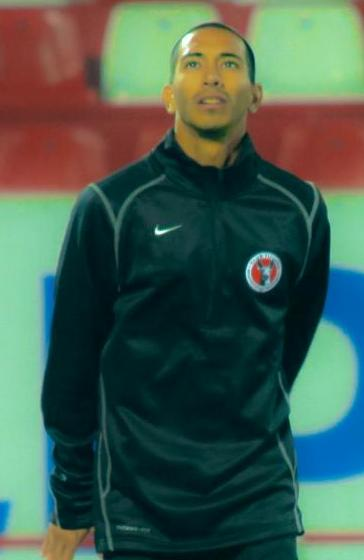
- Castillo with Tijuana

Personal information
- Full name: Edgar Eduardo Castillo Carrillo
- Date of birth: October 8, 1986 (age 40)
- Place of birth: Las Cruces, New Mexico, United States
- Height: 5 ft 6 in (1.68 m)
- Position: Left-back

Senior career*
Years	Team	Apps	(Gls)
2005–2008	Santos Laguna	78	(3)
2009–2012	América	20	(0)
2009–2010	→ Tigres UANL (loan)	26	(2)
2010	→ San Luis (loan)	11	(1)
2011	→ Puebla (loan)	7	(1)
2012	→ Tijuana (loan)	19	(0)
2012–2014	Tijuana	65	(0)
2014–2015	Atlas	37	(1)
2015–2019	Monterrey	43	(1)
2018	→ Colorado Rapids (loan)	28	(3)
2019	New England Revolution	20	(0)
2020	Atlanta United	4	(0)
2021	FC Cincinnati	14	(1)

International career^{‡}
2008	Mexico U23	8	(1)
2007–2008	Mexico	3	(0)
2009–2016	United States	18	(0)
Medal record
Representing United States
Winner	CONCACAF Gold Cup	2013
Men's Soccer
- * Club domestic league appearances and goals as of October 29, 2021 ‡ National team caps and goals as of May 21, 2016

Edgar Eduardo Castillo Carrillo (Note: In this Spanish name, the first or paternal surname is Castillo and the second or maternal family name is Carrillo.) (born October 8, 1986) is an American former professional soccer player who played as a left-back. Castillo is noted for being one of seven players to earn a senior cap for both sides of the United States–Mexico rivalry.

== Youth ==
Castillo grew up in Las Cruces, New Mexico, and played for Mayfield High School under coach Arturo Garibay. In 2002, as a sophomore, he was named NSCAA/Adidas High School State Player of the Year. He was one of the top players in New Mexico as he helped lead Mayfield High School to two state championships games.

He first gained the notice of professional teams in 2005 playing for his local club in the Dallas Cup. His team reached the Dallas Cup final for the Super Group but lost 1–0 to Atletico Paranaense of Brazil.

Castillo was also a player for the Olympic Development Program regional pool for many years. His younger brother, Noel Castillo, is on the reserve team for Indios de Ciudad Juárez of Mexico.

== Professional career ==
Castillo began his professional career with Santos Laguna of the Primera División de México. After becoming a first team regular at Santos, and winning the championship in 2008, Castillo transferred mid-season to Club América in January 2009. During the off-season, Castillo was on loan to Tigres UANL and played for them during the 2009/10 season. He scored his first goal for Tigres against his former side, Santos Laguna, on August 30, 2009.

On November 23, 2011, Castillo agreed to being loaned to Club Tijuana; on June 7, 2012, he joined Tijuana, permanently.

Castillo moved to Atlas during the 2014 off-season.

On January 9, 2018, Castillo moved to the Colorado Rapids on a one-year loan with an option to buy. Castillo made his debut on March 10, 2018, in a 1–2 loss to the New England Revolution. On June 1, 2018, he scored his debut goal for the club in a 1–2 loss to the Vancouver Whitecaps FC.

Ahead of the 2019 season, Castillo was traded to the New England Revolution in exchange for Kelyn Rowe. He made his debut on March 2, 2019, in a 1–1 draw with FC Dallas.

On January 17, 2020, Castillo made the move to Atlanta United after his option was declined by New England at the end of the 2019 season. Following the 2020 season, Castillo was released by Atlanta on November 24, 2020.

On April 13, 2021, Castillo signed with FC Cincinnati on a one-year deal. Following the 2021 season, Cincinnati declined their contract option on Castillo.

== International career ==
=== Mexico ===
In early August 2007, Mexico coach Hugo Sánchez called-up Castillo for the three upcoming friendlies with Colombia, Panama, and Brazil. On August 22, 2007, Castillo made his debut with the Mexico national team and entered at the 53rd minute in the friendly against Colombia. In March 2008 he was also a member of the Mexico U-23 squad which participated in the 2008 CONCACAF Men Pre-Olympic Tournament in order to qualify for 2008 Summer Olympics.

He was called up by Sven-Göran Eriksson to be on the 23-man roster for the Mexico national team, but he was benched during the game against Honduras on August 20, 2008. On November 12, 2008, Castillo appeared in a friendly match against Ecuador in Phoenix, Arizona. He replaced Francisco Fonseca as Mexico beat Ecuador 2–1. He was called up for the national team again on January 28, 2009, in a friendly against Sweden. Castillo was called up to the national side for World Cup qualifiers against Costa Rica in Mexico City and Honduras in San Pedro Sula on March 28 and April 1, 2009, but was unable to travel to either match because he had "lost" his Mexico passport.

=== United States ===
Under a recent change in FIFA regulations, Castillo became eligible to play for the United States. The new rule allowed players of any age to make a one-time national affiliation change if they held citizenship in their new country and yet have not played in a competitive senior level match for their previous nationality. The previous rule only allowed a change if the player was under 21.

On June 29, 2009, he was asked about possibly playing for the United States, saying, "I would play for the United States. I'd want to talk to them first, but I want to play for the U.S. I think it would be a very good opportunity for me, for my career. If they call me I would play for them." Castillo also said, "I have made my decision. I want to represent the country where I was born, the place where I live."

In September 2009, Castillo was cleared by FIFA to join the United States national team. On October 31, 2009, Castillo reveals to Mexican media after a Tigres UANL match vs Estudiantes Tecos that he had received a call earlier that day and stated "I was called up for training with the U.S. team and I am expected to appear to play against Denmark ....I'm hoping to give a good impression".

Castillo made his U.S. debut as a second-half sub in a friendly against Denmark in which they lost on November 18, 2009. He then became the second player to earn caps for both Mexico and the United States, joining Martín Vásquez, who played non-FIFA-recognized matches with Mexico from 1990 to 1992 before receiving official call-ups to the U.S. starting in 1996.

Castillo's decision to join the USMNT triggered a strongly negative response from Mexican fans. "When I changed to the U.S. national team, it was a hard time for me because people called me a traitor and stuff like that," Castillo remarked. He further elaborated on his decision, ultimately stating, "It's a big priority," Castillo said of playing for the United States. "I was born in the U.S.[....] I've played a lot in Mexico because Mexico has been treating me good, I changed to the U.S. national team and I think I made a good choice."

Castillo was later recalled to the USMNT under new head coach Jurgen Klinsmann, and started against Mexico on August 10, 2011.

== Honors ==
Tijuana

- Liga MX: Apertura 2012

Santos Laguna

- Liga MX: Clausura 2008

Monterrey

- Copa MX: Apertura 2017

United States

- CONCACAF Gold Cup: 2013
