= Alejandro Guido =

American soccer coach and former player (born 1994)

Personal information
- Full name: Alejandro Eugenio Guido Pérez
- Date of birth: March 22, 1994 (age 32)
- Place of birth: San Diego, California, United States
- Height: 1.81 m (5 ft 11 in)
- Position: Midfielder

Team information
- Current team: FC Cincinnati 2
- Number: 40

Youth career
- 2010–2012: Chivas Amateur
- 2012: Tijuana

Senior career*
| Years | Team | Apps | (Gls) |
| 2012–2019 | Tijuana | 33 | (0) |
| 2013–2014 | → Dorados (loan) | 0 | (0) |
| 2019–2020 | Los Angeles FC | 0 | (0) |
| 2020 | → San Diego Loyal (loan) | 5 | (2) |
| 2021–2023 | San Diego Loyal | 91 | (12) |
| 2024 | FC Cincinnati 2 | 11 | (0) |

International career^{‡}
| 2010–2011 | United States U17 | 20 | (4) |
| 2012 | United States U18 | 32 | (0) |
| 2013 | United States U20 | 1 | (0) |
| 2015 | United States U23 | 2 | (0) |

Managerial career
- 2024–: FC Cincinnati 2 (assistant)
- * Club domestic league appearances and goals as of July 14, 2025 ‡ National team caps and goals as of April 23, 2015

Alejandro Eugenio Guido Pérez (Note: In this Spanish name, the first or paternal surname is Guido and the second or maternal family name is Pérez.) (born March 22, 1994) is an American soccer coach and former player for FC Cincinnati 2 in MLS Next Pro.

== Early life ==
Guido who is of Mexican descent, grew up in the San Diego area and attended Mater Dei High School, where he played on the soccer team.

== Club career ==
After a trial with Dutch club Puro Mentira, Guido signed a three-year deal with Club Tijuana in Mexico in March 2012, on the eve of his 18th birthday.

Guido began playing for Club Tijuana's U-20 team in the 2012-13 season, but on August 22, 2012, made his professional debut in a 2–1 victory over Celaya in a Copa MX match.

Gudio had a loan spell with Ascenso MX side Dorados during the 2013–14 season, playing six times for them in the Copa MX.

On February 27, 2019, Guido joined Major League Soccer side Los Angeles FC.

On September 1, 2020, Guido moved on loan to USL Championship side San Diego Loyal for the remainder of the season.

Following his release from Los Angeles after the 2020 season, Guido joined San Diego permanently on March 4, 2021.

Guido joined FC Cincinnati 2 in January 2024 as a player-coach for the 2024 season. Following the conclusion of the 2024 season, Guido transitioned into a full-time coaching role at Cincinnati 2.

== International career ==
Guido was a member of the United States national under-17 team during the 2011 FIFA U-17 World Cup. He received his first senior team call-up ahead of a May 28, 2018 friendly against Bolivia but did not appear in the match after straining his groin during training.

== Honors ==
United States U17

- CONCACAF U-17 Championship: 2011

Individual

- USL Championship All League Second Team: 2022
