= Bruno Piceno =

American soccer player (born 1991)

Personal information
- Full name: Bruno Piceno Hurtado
- Date of birth: July 6, 1991 (age 35)
- Place of birth: San Diego, California, United States
- Height: 1.63 m (5 ft 4 in)
- Position: Striker

Senior career*
Years	Team	Apps	(Gls)
2009–2015	Tijuana	14	(1)
2014–2015	→ Dorados (loan)	15	(0)
2015	→ Cafetaleros de Tapachula (loan)	6	(0)
2016	Albinegros de Orizaba	14	(4)
2016–2017	Real Cuautitlán	29	(5)
- * Club domestic league appearances and goals as of January 5, 2021

Bruno Piceno Hurtado (born July 6, 1991) is an American former footballer.

== Club career ==
=== Club Tijuana ===
In 2008, Bruno Piceno started his professional soccer career at Club Tijuana Xoloitzcuintles De Caliente. In 2010, he helped Tijuana obtain the Apertura 2010 champions. Then on May 21, 2011, his team advanced to the Primera División.

== Titles ==
Season	Club	Title
2011	Tijuana	Campeón de Ascenso
