= Alfredo González Tahuilán =

Mexican footballer (born 1980)

Personal information
- Full name: José Alfredo González Tahuilán
- Date of birth: October 4, 1980 (age 46)
- Place of birth: Mexico City, Mexico
- Height: 1.75 m (5 ft 9 in)
- Position: Defender

Senior career*
Years	Team	Apps	(Gls)
1999–2005	América	33	(0)
2005–2009	San Luis	131	(9)
2009–2010	UANL	39	(1)
2010–2011	Atlas	10	(0)
2012–2013	Tijuana	25	(3)
2014–2015	Atlético San Luis	25	(0)
Total		263	(13)

Managerial career
- 2024: Potosinos
- 2025: Zacatepec
- * Club domestic league appearances and goals

José Alfredo González Tahuilán (born 10 April 1980 in Mexico City) is a Mexican former footballer. He last played as a defender for Atlético San Luis.

== Career ==
Gonzalez Tahuilan made his professional debut with CF America on 15 August 1999 against Toros Neza with a score of 2–0 in favor of America. Tahuilan has played in several teams in the first division of Mexican soccer, such as: America, San Luis, Tigres UANL, Atlas, and Tijuana before retiring in San Luis. His biggest strength is the air game.

== Championships ==
=== Tijuana ===
- Liga MX (1):2012–13 Season 2012

=== America ===
2 times with Club America

=== San Luis ===
1 subchampionship with San Luis FC
