= Adrián Zermeño =

Mexican footballer (born 1979)

Adrian Zermeño
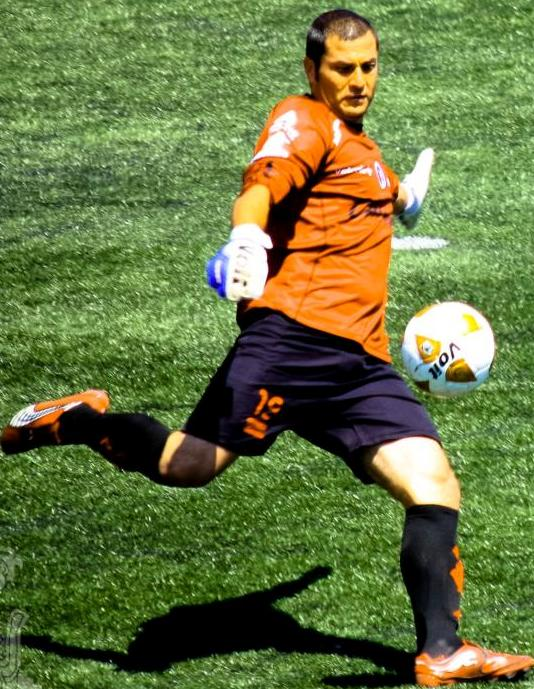

Personal information
- Full name: Adrián Zermeño Iñiguez
- Date of birth: 1 May 1979 (age 47)
- Place of birth: Guadalajara, Jalisco, Mexico
- Height: 1.81 m (5 ft 11 in)
- Position: Goalkeeper

Senior career*
Years	Team	Apps	(Gls)
1997–2002	Cruz Azul	10	(0)
2002–2003	Jaguares	8	(0)
2003–2004	Querétaro	12	(0)
2005–2007	San Luis	9	(0)
2008	Tigres UANL	8	(0)
2008–2014	Tijuana	99	(0)
2014	→ Dorados de Sinaloa (loan)	8	(0)
- * Club domestic league appearances and goals

Adrian Zermeño (born 1 May 1979) is a Mexican former professional footballer.

== Honours ==
Tijuana

- Liga MX: Apertura 2012
