= Daniel Márquez =

Mexican footballer (born 1987)

Personal information
- Full name: Daniel Omar Márquez Palacios
- Date of birth: January 18, 1986 (age 40)
- Place of birth: Manzanillo, Colima, Mexico
- Height: 1.87 m (6 ft 1 1/2 in)
- Position: Forward

Youth career
- 2007: Socio Águila

Senior career*
Years	Team	Apps	(Gls)
2007–2012	América	78	(13)
2012	→ Necaxa (loan)	8	(0)
2013–2014	Tijuana	10	(1)
2014–2015	Atlante	11	(2)
- * Club domestic league appearances and goals

Daniel Omar Márquez Palacios (Note: In this Spanish name, the first or paternal surname is Márquez and the second or maternal family name is Palacios.) (born January 18, 1986) is a Mexican former professional footballer.

== Club career ==
Daniel also played for Reboceros de La Piedad, Morelia Manzanillo. All of these teams are in Primera División A. He played with Fernando Luviano "Cabinnho", one of his best friends.

He made his debut against Club Necaxa. Later, he only played 2 games for the rest of Apertura 2007. He began to play in Clausura in 2008. He scored his first goal in the Copa Libertadores against U. San Martín.

On December 29, 2010, Daniel Marquez scored his first goal in an International team Guatemala with Club América. Later that night, they won the game 4-1 and received the Copa Insurgentes.

== Honours ==
América

- InterLiga: 2008
- Copa Insurgentes: 2010
