= Cirilo Saucedo =

Mexican footballer (born 1982)

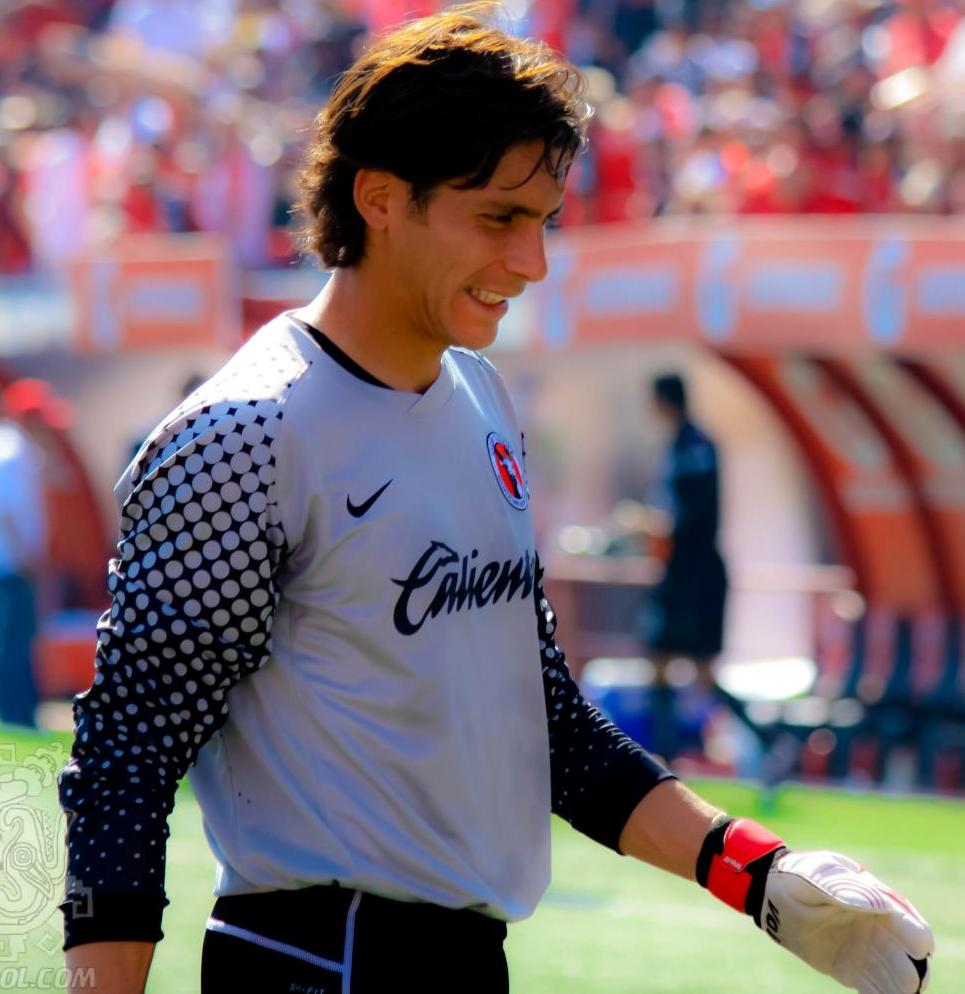
- Saucedo playing for Tijuana

Personal information
- Full name: Cirilo Saucedo Nájera
- Date of birth: 5 January 1982 (age 44)
- Place of birth: Acámbaro, Guanajuato, Mexico
- Height: 1.88 m (6 ft 2 in)
- Position: Goalkeeper

Senior career*
Years	Team	Apps	(Gls)
2001–2004	León	26	(0)
2004–2006	Sinaloa	67	(0)
2006	Veracruz	3	(0)
2006–2011	Tigres UANL	101	(0)
2008–2009	→ Indios (loan)	33	(0)
2011–2015	Tijuana	141	(0)
2015–2016	Morelia	14	(0)
2016–2017	→ Juárez (loan)	27	(0)
Total		412	(0)

International career
2013–2015	Mexico	2	(0)

Managerial career
- 2021–2024: Tijuana Reserves and Academy
- 2023: Tijuana (caretaker)
- 2024–2025: Tijuana (assistant)
- 2025: Tijuana (caretaker)
- 2025: Sinaloa
- * Club domestic league appearances and goals

Cirilo Saucedo Nájera (born 5 January 1982), known as Cirilo Saucedo, is a Mexican football coach and a former goalkeeper.

== Club career ==
Saucedo came to prominence playing for Club León of the Primera A in Mexico. After leading the team to a championship in the 2003 Clausura, Saucedo's team lost to Dorados de Sinaloa in the playoff to determine which team was promoted to the Primera División. Nevertheless, Saucedo moved up, being contracted by the Dorados to reinforce their team.

In his first season in the first division, Saucedo started all 17 games for Sinaloa, allowing 32 goals. Following the 2006 Clausura season, Saucedo's team Dorados was relegated to the Mexican First Division "A". Rather than playing in the lower divisions of the lower leagues, Saucedo was snatched up by CD Veracruz prior to the Apertura 2006 season. A shoulder injury limited him to play in only 2 games for the Red Sharks.

In 2007, he was traded to UANL Tigres for Sebastián González. He spent 3 "short" tournaments there before the 2008 Apertura when the arrival of Oscar Pérez prompted Saucedo's exit from the club.

Tigres loaned the goalkeeper to newly promoted Indios de Ciudad Juárez where he consolidated himself as a starter; he contributed to Indios' semi-final run of the Mexican championship, and more importantly staying at top flight of Mexican football.

With the conclusion of his loan, Saucedo returned to Tigres for the 2009 Apertura. Later he went to win the Superliga with UANL Tigres. After a tied game with Chicago Fire (1–1) and penalty kicks (4–3).

== Personal life ==
His mother is a United States citizen and therefore, he had the option of playing for the United States.

== Career statistics ==
=== International ===
As of match played 16 April 2016

National team	Year	Apps	Goals
Mexico	2013	1	0
Mexico	2015	1	0
Total		2	0

== Honours ==
Tijuana

- Liga MX: Apertura 2012

Mexico U23

- CONCACAF Olympic Qualifying Championship: 2004
