= Juan Carlos Núñez =

Mexican footballer (born 1983)

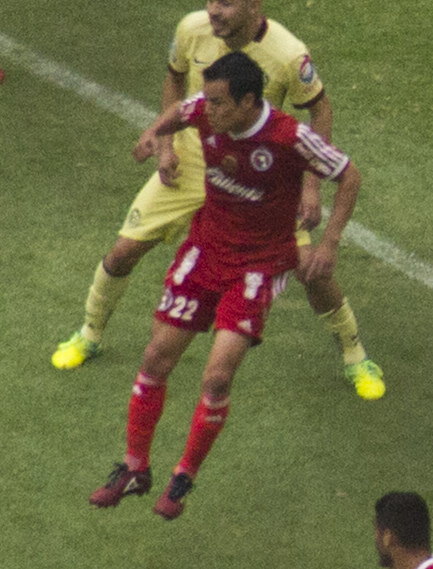
- Núñez playing for Tijuana

Personal information
- Full name: Juan Carlos Núñez Orozco
- Date of birth: 18 April 1983 (age 43)
- Place of birth: Guadalajara, Jalisco, Mexico
- Height: 1.67 m (5 ft 5 1/2 in)
- Position: Defender

Team information
- Current team: Tijuana U19 (women) (manager)

Senior career*
Years	Team	Apps	(Gls)
2002–2008	Atl. Mexiquense	117	(5)
2004–2008	Toluca	15	(0)
2008–2011	→ Tijuana (loan)	70	(2)
2011–2017	Tijuana	151	(0)

Managerial career
- 2019–2020: Tijuana Reserves
- 2020–2021: Tijuana (women) (Assistant)
- 2023: Tecate F.C.
- 2026–: Tijuana U19 (women)
- * Club domestic league appearances and goals

Juan Carlos Núñez Orozco (Note: In this Spanish name, the first or paternal surname is Núñez and the second or maternal family name is Orozco.) (born 18 April 1983) is a Mexican former professional footballer who played as a defender.

== Club career ==
In 2008, Núñez started playing for the Club Tijuana Xoloitzcuintles De Caliente. In 2010, he helped Tijuana obtain the Apertura 2010 champions. Then on May 21, 2011, his team advanced to the Primera División.

== Titles ==
Season	Club	Title
2011	Tijuana	Campeón de Ascenso
Apertura 2012	Tijuana	Liga MX
