= Javier Gandolfi =

Argentine footballer

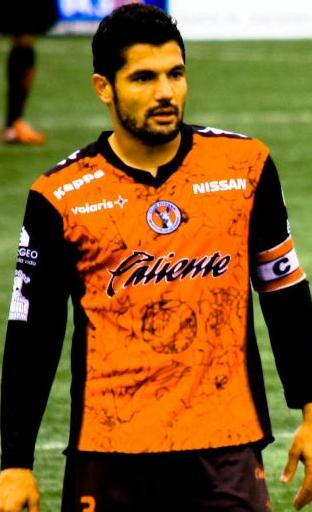
- Gandolfi with Tijuana in 2010

Personal information
- Full name: Javier Marcelo Gandolfi
- Date of birth: 5 December 1980 (age 45)
- Place of birth: San Lorenzo, Argentina
- Height: 1.76 m (5 ft 9 in)
- Position: Defender

Team information
- Current team: León (manager)

Senior career*
| Years | Team | Apps | (Gls) |
| 1999–2002 | River Plate | 8 | (0) |
| 2003 | Talleres | 16 | (2) |
| 2003–2004 | Arsenal de Sarandí | 35 | (1) |
| 2004–2005 | River Plate | 19 | (0) |
| 2006–2008 | Arsenal de Sarandí | 69 | (1) |
| 2009–2010 | Chiapas | 55 | (1) |
| 2010–2011 | → Tijuana (loan) | 42 | (3) |
| 2011–2016 | Tijuana | 201 | (8) |
| 2016–2021 | Talleres | 62 | (1) |
| Total | | 507 | (17) |

Managerial career
- 2022: Talleres (assistant)
- 2022: Talleres (interim)
- 2023: Talleres
- 2024: Independiente del Valle
- 2025: Atlético Nacional
- 2026–: León
- * Club domestic league appearances and goals

Javier Marcelo Gandolfi (born 5 December 1980 in San Lorenzo, Santa Fe) is an Argentine football coach and former player who played as a defender and is currently the manager of Liga MX club León.

Gandolfi also holds Mexican citizenship.

== Playing career ==
Gandolfi started his career in 1999 at Argentine giants River Plate. He has also played for Talleres de Córdoba and his current club; Arsenal.

On 5 December 2007 Gandolfi captained Arsenal to the Copa Sudamericana 2007 title, due to the absence of regular captain Carlos Castiglione for the second leg of the final.

In 2009, Gandolfi was signed by Chiapas. He debuted on 17 January 2009 in a match against CF Atlas. In 2010, Gandolfi moved to Xolos de Tijuana.

Gandolfi returned to Talleres in 2016, and retired in 2021, aged 41.

== Managerial career ==
After retiring, Gandolfi started working as an assistant of his last club Talleres. On 6 September 2022, he was named interim manager after the departure of Pedro Caixinha.

Gandolfi was confirmed as Talleres manager for the 2023 season on 1 November 2023. He left the club on 27 November 2023, after opting to not renew his contract.

On 20 December 2023, Gandolfi replaced compatriot Martín Anselmi at the helm of Ecuadorian Serie A side Independiente del Valle. Despite reaching the finals of the 2024 Serie A and 2024 Copa Ecuador, Gandolfi was sacked on 17 December 2024 after losing both of them.

On 20 January 2025, Gandolfi was announced as manager of Categoría Primera A club Atlético Nacional. He was dismissed on 16 September 2025, following a defeat to Atlético Bucaramanga in which he fielded four foreign players simultaneously, breaching league regulations which only allow teams to field up to three non-Colombian players at the same time.

== Managerial statistics ==
As of 21 November 2026

Managerial record by team and tenure
| Team | Nat | From | To | Record | | | | | | | |
| Team | Nat | From | To | G | W | D | L | GF | GA | GD | Win % |
|---|---|---|---|---|---|---|---|---|---|---|---|
| Talleres (interim) | (Argentina) | 5 September 2022 | 31 October 2022 | 17 | 10 | 3 | 4 | 25 | 13 | +12 | 58.82 |
| Talleres | (Argentina) | 17 January 2023 | 27 November 2023 | 45 | 20 | 15 | 10 | 63 | 41 | +22 | 44.44 |
| Independiente del Valle | (Ecuador) | 1 January 2024 | 17 December 2024 | 46 | 25 | 11 | 10 | 71 | 40 | +31 | 54.35 |
| Atlético Nacional | (Colombia) | 20 January 2025 | 16 September 2025 | 51 | 22 | 17 | 12 | 79 | 48 | +31 | 43.14 |
| Club León | (Mexico) | 20 March 2026 | Present | 29 | 16 | 5 | 8 | 46 | 36 | +10 | 55.17 |
| Total | | | | 188 | 93 | 51 | 44 | 284 | 178 | +106 | 49.47 |

== Honours ==
=== Player ===
Arsenal de Sarandí

- Copa Sudamericana: 2007

Tijuana

- Liga de Ascenso: 2010 Apertura
- Ascenso MX: 2011 Apertura
- Liga MX: 2012 Apertura

=== Manager ===
Atletico Nacional

- Superliga Colombiana: 2025
