= Cristian Pellerano =

Argentine-Mexican footballer

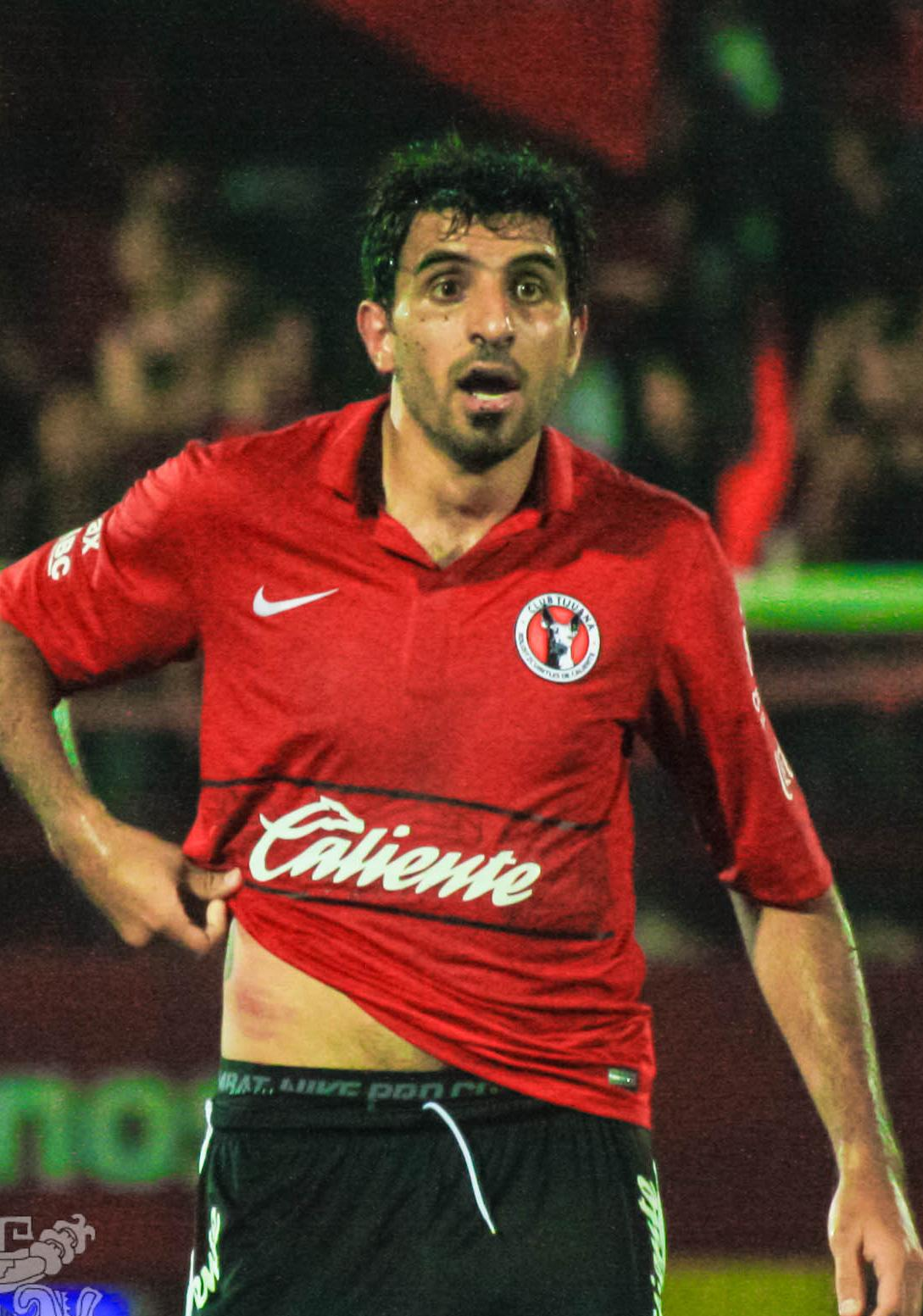
- Pellerano with Tijuana in 2012

Personal information
- Full name: Cristian Alberto Pellerano
- Date of birth: 1 February 1982 (age 44)
- Place of birth: Buenos Aires, Argentina
- Height: 1.82 m (6 ft 0 in)
- Position: Midfielder

Team information
- Current team: Atlanta (manager)

Senior career*
Years	Team	Apps	(Gls)
2001–2004	Atlanta	113	(17)
2005	Defensores de Belgrano	19	(1)
2005–2006	Nueva Chicago	52	(5)
2007	Racing Club	26	(3)
2008–2009	Arsenal de Sarandí	50	(3)
2009–2010	Colón	27	(1)
2010–2012	Independiente	48	(2)
2012–2014	Tijuana	76	(10)
2015–2018	América	12	(0)
2015–2016	→ Morelia (loan)	30	(4)
2016–2017	→ Tapachula (loan)	15	(2)
2017	→ Veracruz (loan)	29	(2)
2018–2023	Independiente del Valle	148	(14)
Total		645	(64)

Managerial career
- 2025–: Atlanta
- * Club domestic league appearances and goals

Cristian Alberto Pellerano (born 1 February 1982) is an Argentine football manager and former player who played as a midfielder. He is the current manager of Atlanta. He is a Mexican naturalized citizen.

His younger brother Hernán is also a professional footballer.

== Career ==
Pellerano started his playing career in 2001 with Club Atlético Atlanta in the lower leagues of Argentine football, playing in 113 matches and scoring 17 goals. In 2005, he joined Defensores de Belgrano of the Primera B Nacional for the Apertura. Later that year he joined Nueva Chicago, helping the club to win promotion to the Primera División.

In 2007 Pellerano was signed by Racing Club, where he established himself as a regular member of the first team squad, making 24 appearances in his year with the club.

Pellerano joined Arsenal de Sarandí in 2008. He scored his first league goal for the club on 25 April 2009 on his 43rd appearance in a game against San Martín de Tucumán.

During the winter transfer window, Pellerano joined Colón de Santa Fe. On 9 June 2010 Independiente signed him on a free transfer.

On 15 July 2012, Pellerano was sold to Mexican Liga MX side Club Tijuana.

On December 15, 2014, Pellerano was transferred to Club America.

== Honours ==
Arsenal de Sarandí

- Suruga Bank Championship: 2008

Independiente

- Copa Sudamericana: 2010

Tijuana

- Liga MX: Apertura 2012

América

- CONCACAF Champions League: 2014–15

Independiente del Valle

- Serie A: 2021
- Copa Ecuador: 2022
- Supercopa Ecuador: 2023
- Copa Sudamericana: 2019, 2022
- Recopa Sudamericana: 2023
