= Richard Ruíz =

Mexican footballer (born 1986)

Personal information
- Full name: Richard Ruíz Toledo
- Date of birth: 14 January 1986 (age 40)
- Place of birth: Jiquipilas, Chiapas, Mexico
- Height: 1.75 m (5 ft 9 in)
- Position: Midfielder

Youth career
- Chiapas

Senior career*
Years	Team	Apps	(Gls)
2006–2009	Salamanca	83	(4)
2009–2015	Tijuana	196	(15)
2015–2017	Cruz Azul	30	(3)
2017–2018	→ Veracruz (loan)	23	(0)
2018–2020	Toluca	28	(0)
2020–2024	Chapulineros de Oaxaca		
2024	Oaxaca	7	(0)
- * Club domestic league appearances and goals as of 30 August 2020

Richard Ruíz (born 14 January 1986) is a former Mexican professional footballer who last played as a midfielder for Alebrijes de Oaxaca.

== Club career ==
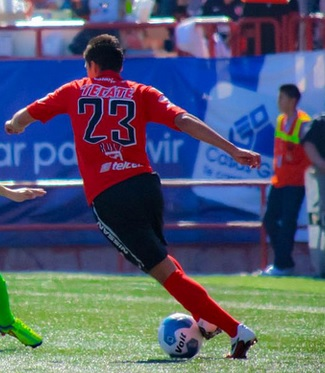
Richard Ruiz during a match.

=== Club Tijuana ===
In 2009, Ruíz started playing for the Club Tijuana Xoloitzcuintles De Caliente. In 2010, he helped Tijuana obtain the Apertura 2010 champions. Then on 21 May 2011, his team advanced to the Primera División.

=== Cruz Azul ===
On 10 June 2015 it was confirmed Ruiz would join the club from Tijuana on a definite purchase.

=== Tiburones Rojos de Veracruz ===
On 7 June 2017 it was confirmed Richard Ruiz would join the club from Cruz Azul on a definite purchase.

=== Toluca ===
On 7 June 2018, After Toluca failed to come to an agreement with Club Leon for Leonel Lopez, Richard Ruiz was signed as a replacement for Lopez.

== Honours ==
=== Club ===
Tijuana

Season	Club	Title
2011	Tijuana	Campeón de Ascenso
Apertura 2012	Tijuana	Apertura 2012

Chapulineros de Oaxaca

- Liga de Balompié Mexicano: 2020–21, 2021
