= 2012–13 Querétaro F.C. season =

Querétaro
2012–13 season
- Chairman: Adolfo Rios & Markus López
- Manager: Carlos de los Cobos (until September 4, 2012); Sergio Bueno (September 4, 2012–February 4, 2013); Ignacio Ambriz (from February 4, 2013)
- Stadium: Estadio Corregidora
- Apertura 2012: 18th (last)
- Clausura 2013: 8th (relegated)
- Copa MX (Apertura): Group stage
- Copa MX (Clausura): Group stage
- Top goalscorer: League: Apertura: Luis Ángel Landín (3); Clausura: Wilberto Cosme; Amaury Escoto (5); All: Luis Ángel Landín (6)
- Highest home attendance: Apertura: 22,700 vs América (August 18, 2012); Clausura: 31,431 vs UNAM (January 12, 2013)
- Lowest home attendance: Apertura: 9,350 vs Atlante (September 1, 2012); Clausura: 8,494 vs Monterrey (March 2, 2013)
Home colours	Away colours

The 2012–13 Querétaro season was the 66th professional season of Mexico's top-flight football league. The season is split into two tournaments—the Torneo Apertura and the Torneo Clausura—each with identical formats and each contested by the same eighteen teams. Querétaro began their season on July 21, 2012 against León, Querétaro played their homes games on Saturdays at 5:00pm local time. Querétaro was relegated to the Ascenso MX (second professional level of the Mexican football league system) due to being last place in the relegation percentage table. Querétaro did not qualify to the final phase in either the Apertura or Clausura tournament.

== Torneo Apertura ==
=== Squad ===
Note: Flags indicate national team as defined under FIFA eligibility rules; some limited exceptions apply. Players may hold more than one non-FIFA nationality.

No.	Pos.	Nation	Player
1	GK	URU	Juan Castillo
2	DF	COL	Efraín Cortés
3	DF	ARG	Martín Aguirre
4	DF	MEX	Diego García
5	MF	MEX	Israel López (captain)
6	MF	MEX	Mitchel Oviedo
7	MF	MEX	Gonzalo Pineda
9	FW	URU	Diego Vera
10	MF	URU	Diego Guastavino
12	FW	MEX	Óscar Alanís
13	FW	MEX	Luis Ángel Landín
14	MF	MEX	Diego de la Torre
15	DF	MEX	Manuel López Mondragón
17	DF	MEX	Daniel Alcántar
19	DF	MEX	Adrián García Arias
20	FW	URU	Carlos Bueno
21	MF	MEX	Marco Antonio Jiménez

No.	Pos.	Nation	Player
22	DF	MEX	Dionicio Escalante
23	DF	MEX	Daniel Valdez
24	DF	MEX	Francisco Vidal
25	MF	COL	Daley Mena
26	DF	MEX	Jorge Valencia
27	MF	MEX	Jonathan de León
28	MF	MEX	Diego Andrade
29	FW	MEX	Edgardo Romero
30	DF	MEX	Alessandro Luna
31	FW	MEX	Armando Pulido
32	MF	MEX	Onay Pineda
33	DF	MEX	David Stringel
34	GK	MEX	Darío Romo
35	GK	MEX	Sergio García
36	MF	MEX	Marvin Piñón
37	FW	MEX	Juan Carlos Enríquez

=== Regular season ===
Win Draw Loss

==== Apertura 2012 results ====
July 21, 2012 Round 1	Querétaro	0–2	León	Querétaro, Querétaro
17:00	Cortés (yellow card) 45+'; Vera (yellow card) 56'; Gustavino (yellow card) 63'; Jiménez (red card) 89'	Report	Burbano 3' (pen.), (yellow card) 30'; González (red card) 42'; Maz (yellow card) 57'; Mascorro (yellow card) 82'; Edwin Hernández 90+1'	Stadium: Estadio Corregidora; Referee: José Alfredo Peñaloza

July 29, 2012 Round 2	UNAM	3–0	Querétaro	Mexico City
12:00	Bravo 5', 15'; García (yellow card) 71'; Espinoza (yellow card) 72'; Herrera (yellow card) 82', (goal) 88'	Report	García Arías (yellow card) 31'; Cortés (yellow card) 82'	Stadium: Estadio Olímpico Universitario; Referee: César Arturo Ramos

August 4, 2012 Round 3	Querétaro	0–1	Pachuca	Querétaro, Querétaro
17:00	Cortés (yellow card) 50'	Report	Borja (yellow card) 6' da Silva 52'; M. Velásquez (yellow card) 54'; López (yellow card) 55'; Arreola (yellow card) 66'; Hernández (yellow card) 78'	Stadium: Estadio Corregidora; Attendance: 13,527; Referee: Jorge Isaac Rojas

August 11, 2012 Round 4	UANL	2–2	Querétaro	San Nicolás de los Garza, Nuevo León
19:00	Ayala (yellow card) 21'; Lobos 48'; Juninho 79'	Report	Alcántar (yellow card) 29'; Cortés (yellow card) 34'; Ayala 64' (o.g.); Tapía 70'	Stadium: Estadio Universitario; Attendance: 37,050; Referee: Luis Enrique Santander

August 18, 2012 Round 5	Querétaro	0–4	América	Querétaro, Querétaro
17:00	Bueno (yellow card) 26'	Report	Benítez 10', (yellow card) 11'; Montenegro 23'; Sambueza 30', (yellow card) 48'; Aguilar (yellow card) 68'; Bermúdez 86'	Stadium: Estadio Corregidora; Attendance: 22,700; Referee: Marco Antonio Rodríguez

August 24, 2012 Round 6	Chiapas	2–1	Querétaro	Tuxtla Gutiérrez, Chiapas
19:30	Esqueda (yellow card) 26'; Corral (yellow card) 50'; Rey 67'; Córdoba (yellow card) 70'; Arizala 88', (yellow card) 88'	Report	Enríquez (yellow card) 36'; García Arías (yellow card) 57'; Oviedo 62'; Cortés (red card) 90'	Stadium: Estadio Victor Manuel Reyna; Attendance: 7,244; Referee: Fernando Guerrero

September 1, 2012 Round 7	Querétaro	0–1	Atlante	Querétaro, Querétaro
17:00	García Arias (yellow card) 13'; Valencia (yellow card) 64'; Bueno (yellow card) 77'; Jiménez (yellow card) 90+2'; García (yellow card) 90+3'	Report	Paredes 17'; Guagua (yellow card) 53'; I. Martínez (yellow card) 59'; Villalpando (yellow card) 77'	Stadium: Estadio Corregidora; Attendance: 9,350; Referee: Erim Ramírez

September 15, 2012 Round 8	Atlas	0–0	Querétaro	Guadalajara, Jalisco
21:00	Ayala (yellow card) 79'; Vuoso (yellow card) 82'; Torres (red card) 85'	Report	Echevarría (yellow card) 1'; Rippa (yellow card) 67'; Pineda (yellow card) 79'	Stadium: Estadio Jalisco; Attendance: 9,000; Referee: Ricardo Arellano

September 22, 2012 Round 9	Monterrey	3–2	Querétaro	Monterrey, Nuevo León
19:00	Morales (yellow card) 45+3'; Suazo (yellow card) 45+4'; Cardozo 49'; Orozco (yellow card) 58'; Carreño 69'; Mier (yellow card) 72'; Reyna 81'	Report	Bueno 14', (yellow card) 66'; Jiménez (yellow card) 52'; Guastavino 71'; Pineda (yellow card) 73'	Stadium: Estadio Tecnológico; Attendance: 33,105; Referee: Jorge Antonio Pérez

September 29, 2012 Round 10	Querétaro	0–1	Tijuana	Querétaro, Querétaro
17:00	Bueno (yellow card) 22'; Pineda (yellow card) 44'; Jiménez (yellow card) 66'; Landín (yellow card) 82'; García Arias (yellow card) 88'	Report	Aguilar (yellow card) 10' (yellow-red card) 55'; Gandolfi (yellow card) 17'; Arce (yellow card) 19'; Moreno 38'; Pellerano (yellow card) 63'	Stadium: Estadio Corregidora; Attendance: 12,740; Referee: Miguel Ángel Ortega

October 3, 2012 Round 11	Toluca	4–1	Querétaro	Toluca, Estado de Mexico
19:00	Tejada 4', 45+1', (yellow card) 24'; Sinha 43'; Ríos (yellow card) 64'; Cacho 77'	Report	Pineda 15'; Cortés (yellow card) 17'	Stadium: Estadio Nemesio Díez; Attendance: 7,899; Referee: Antony Zanjuampa

October 6, 2012 Round 12	Querétaro	1–1	Santos Laguna	Querétaro, Querétaro
17:00	Escalante (yellow card) 30'; Landín 51'; Bueno (yellow card) 81'	Report	Gómez 36'; Mares (yellow card) 49'	Stadium: Estadio Corregidora; Referee: Miguel Ángel Ayala Ramírez

October 13, 2012 Round 13	Cruz Azul	3–2	Querétaro	Mexico City
17:00	Bravo 8', 40'; Castro (yellow card) 18'; Pavone 58'	Report	Vera 30'; Landín (yellow card) 35', (goal) 71'; Pineda (yellow card) 86'	Stadium: Estadio Azul; Attendance: 12,583; Referee: Mauricio Morales

October 20, 2012 Round 14	Querétaro	1–2	Morelia	Querétaro, Querétaro
17:00	García Arias (yellow card) 34'; Rippa (yellow card) 50'; Vera 55', (yellow card) 78'; García (yellow card) 90+2'	Report	Huqui (yellow card) 14'; Torres (yellow card) 28'; Sabah (yellow card) 49' (yellow-red card) 90+3', (goal) 90+3'; Rojas 51', (yellow card) 62'	Stadium: Estadio Corregidora; Referee: Fernando Guerrero

October 27, 2012 Round 15	San Luis	0–0	Querétaro	San Luis Potosí, San Luis Potosí
17:00	Everton (yellow card) 46'; Arredondo (yellow card) 51' (yellow-red card) 89'; Cadavid (yellow card) 86'; Tréllez (yellow card) 90+3'	Report		Stadium: Estadio Alfonso Lastras; Attendance: 11,977; Referee: Marco Antonio Rodríguez

November 3, 2012 Round 16	Querétaro	0–1	Guadalajara	Querétaro, Querétaro
17:00	Escalante (yellow card) 24'; Oviedo (yellow card) 75'; Rippa (yellow card) 90+2'; Jiménez (yellow card) 90+4'	Report	Fabián 83'	Stadium: Estadio Corregidora; Attendance: 21,600+ Referee: Roberto García Orozco

November 11, 2012 Round 17	Puebla	0–1	Querétaro	Puebla, Puebla
12:00		Report	Landín 12'; Pineda (yellow card) 14' (yellow-red card) 68'; Escalante (yellow card) 51'; García (yellow card) 81'; Vera (yellow card) 90+4'	Stadium: Estadio Cuauhtémoc; Attendance: 11,160; Referee: Jorge Antonio Pérez

=== Goalscorers ===
Position	Nation	Name	Goals scored
1.	(Mexico)	Luis Ángel Landín	3
2.	(Uruguay)	Diego Vera	2
3.	(Uruguay)	Carlos Bueno	1
3.	(Uruguay)	Diego Guastavino	1
3.	(Mexico)	Mitchel Oviedo	1
3.	(Mexico)	Gonzalo Pineda	1
3.	(Mexico)	Emmanuel Tapia	1
3.		Own Goal	1
TOTAL			11

=== Results ===
==== Results summary ====
Overall								Home						Away					
Pld	W	D	L	GF	GA	GD	Pts	W	D	L	GF	GA	GD	W	D	L	GF	GA	GD
17	1	4	12	11	29	−18	7	0	1	7	2	13	−11	1	3	5	9	16	−7

Last updated: 11 November 2012.
Source: Apertura 2012 results

==== Results by round ====
Round	1	2	3	4	5	6	7	8	9	10	11	12	13	14	15	16	17
Ground	H	A	H	A	H	A	H	A	A	H	A	H	A	H	A	H	A
Result	L	L	L	D	L	L	L	D	L	L	L	D	L	L	D	L	W
Position	17	17	17	17	18	18	18	18	18	18	18	18	18	18	18	18	18

Updated to match(es) played on 11 November 2012. Source: Apertura 2012 results and mediotiempo.com
A = Away; H = Home; W = Win; D = Draw; L = Loss

== Apertura 2012 Copa MX ==
=== Group stage ===
Win Draw Loss

==== Apertura results ====
July 24, 2012 1	Querétaro	1–2	UAT	Querétaro, Querétaro
19:00	Oviedo (yellow card) 34'; Olmedo (yellow card) 40'; Valencia (yellow card) 48'; Landín (yellow card) 73', (goal) 84'	Report	Sánchez Guerrero (red card) 25' de la Barrera (yellow card) 28'; Vázquez 49'; Nurse 65'	Stadium: Estadio Corregidora; Referee: Victor Bisquerra

July 31, 2012 2	UAT	2–2	Querétaro	Ciudad Victoria, Tamaulipas
19:00	de la Barrera (yellow card) 12'; Mora 78'; Pacheco 82'	Report	Tapia 54'; García 90+1'	Stadium: Estadio Marte R. Gómez; Referee: Obed Gómez

August 8, 2012 3	Veracruz	0–3	Querétaro	Veracruz, Veracruz
19:00	Armando (yellow card) 25'; Berber (yellow card) 78'; Pineda (yellow card) 88'	Report	Tapia 6', 12', 25'; Pulido (yellow card) 35'	Stadium: Estadio Luis Pirata Fuente; Attendance: 5,300; Referee: Mauricio Martínez

August 21, 2012 4	Querétaro	2–2	Veracruz	Querétaro, Querétaro
19:00	Valencia (yellow card) 1' (yellow-red card) 63'; Enríquez (yellow card) 24', (goal) 54'; Pulido 40'	Report	Olguín (yellow card) 59'; Torres 74', 88'; Favela (yellow card) 89'; Armando (yellow card) 90'	Stadium: Estadio Corregidora; Referee: Ricardo Arellano

August 29, 2012 5	América	4–1	Querétaro	Mexico City
21:00	A. López 2'; Reyes (yellow card) 26'; Montenegro 38' (pen.); Zúñiga 83'; Medina 90+1'	Report	Escalante (yellow card) 42'; Pineda (red card) 49'; Vera (yellow card) 53' (yellow-red card) 88'; Guastavino 57'; García Arías (yellow card) 71' (yellow-red card) 71'	Stadium: Estadio Azteca; Referee: Miguel Ángel Flores

September 19, 2012 6	Querétaro	1–0	América	Querétaro, Querétaro
19:00	Stringel (yellow card) 47'; Escoto (yellow card) 62'; Guastavino 65'; Escalante (yellow card) 65'; Oviedo (yellow card) 76' (yellow-red card) 77'	Report	Valenzuela (red card) 26'; Layún (yellow card) 26'; Medina (yellow card) 86' (yellow-red card) 87'	Stadium: Estadio Corregidora; Attendance: 14,700; Referee: Miguel Ángel Ortega

=== Goalscorers ===
Position	Nation	Name	Goals scored
1.	(Mexico)	Emmanuel Tapia	4
2.	(Uruguay)	Diego Guastavino	2
3.	(Mexico)	Juan Carlos Enríquez	1
3.	(Mexico)	Alberto García	1
3.	(Mexico)	Luis Ángel Landín	1
3.	(Mexico)	Armando Pulido	1
TOTAL			10

=== Results by round ===
Round	1	2	3	4	5	6
Ground	H	A	A	H	A	H
Result	L	D	W	D	L	W
Position	3	4	2	3	3	3

Updated to match(es) played on 19 September 2012. Source: Apertura results and mediotiempo.com
A = Away; H = Home; W = Win; D = Draw; L = Loss

== Torneo Clausura ==
=== Squad ===
Note: Flags indicate national team as defined under FIFA eligibility rules; some limited exceptions apply. Players may hold more than one non-FIFA nationality.

No.	Pos.	Nation	Player
1	GK	MEX	Liborio Sánchez
2	DF	MEX	Diego Martinez
3	DF	MEX	Diego Cervantes
4	DF	MEX	Dionicio Escalante
5	DF	MEX	Manuel López Mondragón
6	MF	MEX	Mitchel Oviedo
7	MF	MEX	Gonzalo Pineda
8	MF	MEX	Diego de la Torre
9	FW	MEX	Luis Ángel Landín
10	MF	COL	Omar Vásquez
11	MF	MEX	Arturo Echavarría
12	MF	CRC	Pablo Gabas
13	DF	BRA	Apodi
14	FW	MEX	David Izazola
15	DF	MEX	Daniel Amador
16	MF	PER	Juan Carlos Mariño
17	DF	MEX	Mario Osuna
18	GK	MEX	Sergio García
19	DF	MEX	Adrián García Arias
20	GK	MEX	Antonio Pérez

No.	Pos.	Nation	Player
21	MF	MEX	Marco Jiménez
22	DF	MEX	Alfonso Rippa
23	MF	MEX	Manuel Pérez
24	FW	COL	Wilberto Cosme
25	MF	MEX	Antonio Gallardo
27	DF	MEX	Christian Pérez
28	MF	MEX	Diego Andrade
29	FW	MEX	Julio Nava
30	MF	MEX	Jonathan de León
31	MF	MEX	Héctor Gómez
32	DF	MEX	Onay Pineda
33	DF	MEX	Patricio Treviño
34	GK	MEX	Darío Romo
35	DF	COL	Oswaldo Henríquez
36	MF	MEX	Carlos Zamarripa
56	MF	MEX	Jaime Gómez
59	MF	MEX	Eduardo Sayún
62	FW	MEX	Amaury Escoto
68	DF	MEX	Arelibetsiel Hernández
93	FW	MEX	Víctor Milke

=== Regular season ===
Win Draw Loss

==== Clausura 2013 results ====
January 5, 2013 Round 1	León	2–2	Querétaro	León, Guanajuato
20:06	Hernández 24'; Montes (yellow card) 48'; Britos 50', (yellow card) 85'; Pineda (yellow card) 81'	Report	Vázquez 36'; Pineda (yellow card) 58'; Pérez (yellow card) 83'; Escoto 89'	Stadium: Estadio León; Attendance: 25,031; Referee: Marco Antonio Rodríguez

January 12, 2013 Round 2	Querétaro	2–1	UNAM	Querétaro, Querétaro
17:00	Escoto 64', 65'	Report	M. Palacios (yellow card) 18' (yellow-red card) 35'; Velarde (yellow card) 35'; A. Palacios (yellow card) 45+1'; Cortés 52'; Cabrera (yellow card) 90'	Stadium: Estadio Corregidora; Attendance: 31,431; Referee: Fernando Guerrero

January 19, 2013 Round 3	Pachuca	1–1	Querétaro	Pachuca, Hidalgo
19:00	da Silva (red card) 12'; Carreño 18'; Hurtado (yellow card) 61'; Reyna (yellow card) 82'	Report	Landín 6'; Escalante (yellow card) 35' (yellow-red card) 43'; Cosme (yellow card) 55'; Mariño (yellow card) 67' (yellow-red card) 88'; Henríquez (yellow card) 78'	Stadium: Estadio Hidalgo; Attendance: 28,150; Referee: Jorge Isaac Rojas

January 26, 2013 Round 4	Querétaro	0–2	UANL	Querétaro, Querétaro
17:00	Landín (yellow card) 16'	Report	Torres (yellow card) 17'; Villa 39'; Torres Nilo (yellow card) 76'; Danilinho 89'	Stadium: Estadio Corregidora; Attendance: 20,311; Referee: Fabricio Morales

February 2, 2013 Round 5	América	3–0	Querétaro	Coyoacán, Mexico City
17:00	Jiménez 15', 70'; Sambueza (yellow card) 75'; Benítez 87'	Report	Osuna (yellow card) 39' de la Torre (yellow card) 73'; Pineda (yellow card) 90+3'	Stadium: Estadio Azteca; Attendance: 27,964; Referee: Roberto García Orozco

February 9, 2013 Round 6	Querétaro	1–1	Chiapas	Querétaro, Querétaro
17:00	Landín (yellow card) 23'; Escalante (yellow card) 62'; Escoto 83'	Report	P. Hernández (yellow card) 31'; Rodríguez 41'; É. Hernández (yellow card) 68'	Stadium: Estadio Corregidora; Attendance: 10,683; Referee: Erim Ramírez

February 17, 2013 Round 7	Atlante	1–1	Querétaro	Cancún, Quintana Roo
18:00	Fonseca (yellow card) 22'; Guerrero (yellow card) 51'; Venegas (yellow card) 55'; Bizera 90+3'	Report	Cosme (yellow card) 55'; Landín 67', (yellow card) 72'; García (yellow card) 80' de la Torre (yellow card) 90+3'	Stadium: Estadio Andrés Quintana Roo; Attendance: 3,810; Referee: Antony Zanjuampa

February 23, 2013 Round 8	Querétaro	0–0	Atlas	Querétaro, Querétaro
17:00	Landín (yellow card) 39'; Escalante (yellow card) 79'	Report	Millar (yellow card) 28'	Stadium: Estadio Corregidora; Attendance: 21,900; Referee: Marco Antonio Rodríguez

March 2, 2013 Round 9	Querétaro	1–0	Monterrey	Querétaro, Querétaro
17:00	Cosme 3'; Nava (yellow card) 52'; Apodi (yellow card) 73'; Osuna (yellow card) 90'	Report	Chávez (yellow card) 44'; Zavala (yellow card) 90'; Basanta (yellow card) 90+2'	Stadium: Estadio Corregidora; Attendance: 8,494; Referee: Paul Enrique Delgadillo

March 9, 2013 Round 10	Tijuana	0–1	Querétaro	Tijuana, Baja California
17:00	Maya (yellow card) 20'; Garza (yellow card) 61'	Report	Escalante (yellow card) 22'; Cosme 33'; Apodi (yellow card) 85'	Stadium: Estadio Caliente; Attendance: 23,133; Referee: Francisco Chacón

March 16, 2013 Round 11	Querétaro	1–0	Toluca	Querétaro, Querétaro
17:00	Gabas (yellow card) 22'; Novaretti 31' (o.g.); Escoto (yellow card) 35'; Cosme (yellow card) 37'; Jiménez (yellow card) 55' de la Torre (yellow card) 61'	Report	Tejada (yellow card) 39'; Santos (yellow card) 49'; Rodríguez (yellow card) 49'; Wilson Mathías (yellow card) 77'	Stadium: Estadio Corregidora; Attendance: 16,739; Referee: Miguel Ángel Flores

March 30, 2013 Round 12	Santos Laguna	1–1	Querétaro	Torreón, Coahuila
19:00	Peralta 37' (pen.), (yellow card) 56'; Mares (yellow card) 90+3'	Report	García (yellow card) 37'; Escoto (yellow card) 46'; Escalante (yellow card) 68'; Osuna (yellow card) 73' (yellow-red card) 76'; Oviedo (yellow card) 90'; Baloy 90+3'	Stadium: Estadio Corona; Attendance: 25,412; Referee: César Arturo Ramos

April 6, 2013 Round 13	Querétaro	1–2	Cruz Azul	Querétaro, Querétaro
17:00	de la Torre 11', (yellow card) 53'; Gabas (yellow card) 44'; Henríquez (yellow card) 76'	Report	Bello (yellow card) 20'; A. Castro (yellow card) 30'; Bertolo 46'; Perea (yellow card) 60'; Orozco 72'	Stadium: Estadio Corregidora; Attendance: 28,303; Referee: Jorge Antonio Pérez

April 12, 2013 Round 14	Morelia	1–0	Querétaro	Morelia, Michoacán
21:30	Mancilla 77'	Report	Pineda (yellow card) 8'	Stadium: Estadio Morelos; Attendance: 13,016; Referee: Roberto García Orozco

April 20, 2013 Round 15	Querétaro	2–1	San Luis	Querétaro, Querétaro
17:00	Escoto 51'; Cosme 87'	Report	Ortiz 23'; Rodríguez (yellow card) 38'; Corona (yellow card) 62'; Pérez (yellow card) 90+4'; Razo (yellow card) 90+4'	Stadium: Estadio Corregidora; Attendance: 12,744; Referee: Marco Antonio Rodríguez

April 28, 2013 Round 16	Guadalajara	1–2	Querétaro	Zapopan, Jalisco
17:00	S. Pérez (yellow card) 32'; Enríquez (yellow card) 40'; Coronado 67'; L. Pérez (yellow card) 81'	Report	Escoto (yellow card) 21'; Pineda (red card) 26'; S. Pérez 37' (o.g.); Cosme 52'	Stadium: Estadio Omnilife; Attendance: 18,920; Referee: Jorge Isaac Rojas

May 4, 2013 Round 17	Querétaro	2–3	Puebla	Querétaro, Querétaro
21:00	Chávez 73' (o.g.); Cosme 76'; Escalante (yellow card) 79'	Report	Lacerda (yellow card) 34'; Borja 38', (yellow card) 73'; Noriega (yellow card) 39'; Orozco (yellow card) 54'; Alustiza 69', 79' (pen.)	Stadium: Estadio Corregidora; Attendance: 26,670; Referee: Paúl Delgadillo

Querétaro did not qualify to the Final Phase due to being relegated

=== Goalscorers ===
Position	Nation	Name	Goals scored
2.	(Colombia)	Wilberto Cosme	5
1.	(Mexico)	Amaury Escoto	5
3.		Own Goals	4
4.	(Mexico)	Luis Ángel Landín	2
5.	(Mexico)	Diego de la Torre	1
5.	(Colombia)	Omar Vásquez	1
TOTAL			18

=== Results ===
==== Results summary ====
Overall								Home						Away					
Pld	W	D	L	GF	GA	GD	Pts	W	D	L	GF	GA	GD	W	D	L	GF	GA	GD
17	6	6	5	18	20	−2	24	4	2	3	10	10	0	2	4	2	8	10	−2

Last updated: 4 May 2013.
Source: Clausura 2013 results

==== Results by round ====
Round	1	2	3	4	5	6	7	8	9	10	11	12	13	14	15	16	17
Ground	A	H	A	H	A	H	A	H	H	A	H	A	H	A	H	A	H
Result	D	W	D	L	L	D	D	D	W	W	W	D	L	L	W	W	L
Position	7	7	5	10	14	13	13	14	12	9	8	6	9	11	8	8	8

Updated to match(es) played on 4 May 2013. Source: Clausura 2013 results and mediotiempo.com
A = Away; H = Home; W = Win; D = Draw; L = Loss

== Clausura 2013 Copa MX ==
=== Group stage ===
Win Draw Loss

==== Clausura results ====
January 16, 2013 1	Estudiantes Tecos	1–2	Querétaro	Zapopan, Jalisco
19:00	Nieves 32'	Report	Gabas 12'; Jiménez (yellow card) 42'; Echevarria 62'; López (red card) 80'	Stadium: Estadio Tres de Marzo; Attendance: 3,099; Referee: Uriel Olvera Ríos

January 22, 2013 2	Querétaro	1–1	Estudiantes Tecos	Querétaro, Querétaro
19:00	Arias (yellow card) 20'; Amador (yellow card) 32'; Vázquez (yellow card) 49'; Rippa 67'; Oviedo (yellow card) 84'	Report	Lillingston 21'; Cisneros (yellow card) 43'; Nieves (yellow card) 49'; Villalobos (yellow card) 61'; Sánchez (yellow card) 64'	Stadium: Estadio Corregidora; Referee: Miguel Ángel Ayala

February 13, 2013 3	Querétaro	1–1	Veracruz	Querétaro, Querétaro
19:00	López (yellow card) 12'; Amador (yellow card) 17'; Oviedo (yellow card) 30'; H. Gómez 70'	Report	Reyes (yellow card) 20'; Vela (red card) 25'; Marrufo 50'; Bernal (yellow card) 70'; Olguín (yellow card) 75'; Pineda (yellow card) 75'	Stadium: Estadio Corregidora; Attendance: 4,864; Referee: Jorge Isaac Rojas

February 20, 2013 4	Veracruz	0–1	Querétaro	Veracruz, Veracruz
21:00	Arellano (yellow card) 75'; Olguin (yellow card) 90'	Report	Gabas (yellow card) 27'; Escoto (yellow card) 38'; Gallardo (yellow card) 55'; M. Pérez (yellow card) 67'; Cervantes 90+1'	Stadium: Luis Pirate Fuente; Attendance: 4,978; Referee: Fernando Hernández

February 26, 2013 5	Querétaro	1–1	Morelia	Querétaro, Querétaro
21:00	Gabas (yellow card) 39'; Oviedo 63'	Report	Sato (yellow card) 14'; Morales (yellow card) 30'; Guerrero (yellow card) 71'; Torres 72'	Stadium: Estadio Corregidora; Referee: Miguel Ángel Chacón

March 5, 2013 6	Morelia	0–0	Querétaro	Morelia, Michoacán
21:00	Silva (yellow card) 60'; Ruiz (yellow card) 62'; Santana (yellow card) 76'	Report	Gabas (yellow card) 38'; López (yellow card) 59'; Pineda (yellow card) 76'; Oviedo (yellow card) 77'	Stadium: Estadio Morelos; Referee: César Arturo Ramos

=== Goalscorers ===
Position	Nation	Name	Goals scored
1.	(Mexico)	Diego Cervantes	1
1.	(Argentina)	Pablo Antonio Gabas	1
1.	(Mexico)	Arturo Echavarría	1
1.	(Mexico)	Héctor Gómez	1
1.	(Mexico)	Mitchel Oviedo	1
1.	(Mexico)	Alfonso Rippa	1
TOTAL			6

=== Results ===
==== Results by round ====
Round	1	2	3	4	5	6
Ground	A	H	H	A	H	A
Result	W	D	D	W	D	D
Position	1	1	1	1	1	2

Updated to match(es) played on 5 March 2013. Source: Clausura results and mediotiempo.com
A = Away; H = Home; W = Win; D = Draw; L = Loss
