= List of Mexican football transfers winter 2012–13 =

This is a list of Mexican football transfers in the Mexican Primera Division during the winter 2012–13 transfer window, grouped by club. It only includes football transfers related to clubs from Liga MX, the first division of Mexican football.

== Mexican Primera Division ==
=== América ===
In: Note: Flags indicate national team as defined under FIFA eligibility rules; some limited exceptions apply. Players may hold more than one non-FIFA nationality.

No.	Pos.	Nation	Player
2	DF	MEX	Francisco Rodríguez (from (Germany) VFB Stuttgart)
7	FW	ECU	Narciso Mina (from (Ecuador) Barcelona)
10	MF	PAR	Osvaldo Martínez (from Atlante)

Out: Note: Flags indicate national team as defined under FIFA eligibility rules; some limited exceptions apply. Players may hold more than one non-FIFA nationality.

No.	Pos.	Nation	Player
2	DF	MEX	Erik Pimentel (on loan to Atlante)
7	MF	MEX	José María Cárdenas (to Morelia)
8	MF	BRA	Rosinei (to (Brazil) Atlético Mineiro)
10	MF	ARG	Daniel Montenegro (to (Argentina) Independiente)
15	MF	MEX	Pedro García (on loan to Mérida)
20	DF	MEX	Jorge Reyes (on loan to Veracruz)
27	DF	MEX	Daniel Acosta (on loan to Mérida)
––	MF	MEX	Isaac Acuña (to Atlante, previously on loan at Mérida)
––	FW	MEX	Daniel Márquez (on loan to Tijuana, previously on loan at Club Necaxa)

=== Atlante ===
In: Note: Flags indicate national team as defined under FIFA eligibility rules; some limited exceptions apply. Players may hold more than one non-FIFA nationality.

No.	Pos.	Nation	Player
—	DF	URU	Joe Bizera (from (Paraguay) Libertad)
—	DF	MEX	José Antonio Castro (from San Luis)
—	DF	MEX	Diego Jiménez (from Tecos)
—	DF	MEX	Diego Ordaz (loan return from San Luis)
—	DF	MEX	Erik Pimentel (on loan from América)
—	MF	MEX	Isaac Acuña (from América, previously on loan at Mérida)
—	MF	ECU	David Quiroz (loan return from (Ecuador) Liga de Quito)
—	FW	MEX	Alberto García (from Querétaro)
—	FW	ARG	Joaquín Larrivey (from (Italy) Cagliari)

Out: Note: Flags indicate national team as defined under FIFA eligibility rules; some limited exceptions apply. Players may hold more than one non-FIFA nationality.

No.	Pos.	Nation	Player
1	GK	MEX	Antonio Pérez (to Querétaro)
2	DF	ECU	Jorge Guagua (on loan to (Ecuador) Deportivo Quito)
8	MF	PAR	Osvaldo Martínez (to América)
9	MF	CPV	Valdo (on loan to (Spain) Levante)
19	DF	MEX	Ricardo Jiménez (to San Luis)
27	MF	MEX	Raymundo Torres (on loan to Mérida)
78	FW	MEX	Omar Marrufo (on loan to Veracruz)
––	MF	MEX	Ignacio Torres (to Mérida, previously on loan)

=== Atlas ===
In: Note: Flags indicate national team as defined under FIFA eligibility rules; some limited exceptions apply. Players may hold more than one non-FIFA nationality.

No.	Pos.	Nation	Player
—	DF	MEX	Óscar Razo (from Morelia)
—	MF	BOL	José Luis Chávez (on loan from (Bolivia) Blooming)
—	MF	MEX	Isaac Brizuela (on loan from Toluca)
—	MF	CHI	Rodrigo Millar (from (Chile) Colo Colo)
—	MF	MEX	Arturo Paganoni (loan return from Toluca)
—	FW	MEX	Omar Bravo (from Cruz Azul)
—	FW	MEX	Edson Rivera (from (Portugal) Sporting de Braga)

Out: Note: Flags indicate national team as defined under FIFA eligibility rules; some limited exceptions apply. Players may hold more than one non-FIFA nationality.

No.	Pos.	Nation	Player
2	DF	MEX	Christian Sánchez (on loan to Tecos)
7	MF	MEX	Flavio Santos (on loan to Toluca)
9	FW	CHI	Héctor Mancilla (to Morelia)
10	MF	ECU	Luis Bolaños (loan return to (Brazil) Internacional)
11	FW	MEX	Sergio Santana (to Morelia)
18	MF	MEX	Luis Télles (on loan to U de G)
20	DF	MEX	Hugo Rodríguez (to UANL)
27	MF	MEX	Christian Diaz (on loan to U de G)
––	MF	MEX	Saúl Villalobos (on loan to Tecos, previously on loan to León)

=== Chiapas ===
In: Note: Flags indicate national team as defined under FIFA eligibility rules; some limited exceptions apply. Players may hold more than one non-FIFA nationality.

No.	Pos.	Nation	Player
—	DF	MEX	Eduardo Chávez (loan return from Toros Neza)
—	DF	MEX	Francisco Dorame (from Toros Neza)
—	MF	MEX	Jorge Gastélum (on loan from Morelia, previously on loan at Puebla)
—	MF	MEX	David Toledo (from UANL)

Out: Note: Flags indicate national team as defined under FIFA eligibility rules; some limited exceptions apply. Players may hold more than one non-FIFA nationality.

No.	Pos.	Nation	Player
7	DF	MEX	Yasser Corona (to San Luis)
8	MF	MEX	Alan Zamora (to San Luis)
12	FW	MEX	Antonio Salazar (on loan to Altamira)
14	MF	MEX	Luis Miguel Noriega (to Puebla)
35	DF	MEX	Jesús Castillo (on loan to Pumas Morelos)
––	DF	CHI	Ismael Fuentes (unregistered, on loan to Correcaminos UAT)

=== Cruz Azul ===
In: Note: Flags indicate national team as defined under FIFA eligibility rules; some limited exceptions apply. Players may hold more than one non-FIFA nationality.

No.	Pos.	Nation	Player
—	MF	ARG	Nicolás Bertolo (from (Italy) Palermo)
—	FW	COL	Teófilo Gutiérrez (from (Argentina) Racing Club, previously on loan at (Colombia) Junior de Barranquilla)

Out: Note: Flags indicate national team as defined under FIFA eligibility rules; some limited exceptions apply. Players may hold more than one non-FIFA nationality.

No.	Pos.	Nation	Player
2	DF	MEX	Fausto Pinto (to Toluca)
7	MF	MEX	Javier Aquino (to (Spain) Villarreal)
9	FW	MEX	Omar Bravo (to Atlas)
18	MF	BRA	Maranhão (on loan to (Brazil) Atlético Paranaense)
22	DF	MEX	Adrián Cortés (on loan to Guadalajara)

=== Guadalajara ===
In: Note: Flags indicate national team as defined under FIFA eligibility rules; some limited exceptions apply. Players may hold more than one non-FIFA nationality.

No.	Pos.	Nation	Player
—	DF	MEX	Adrián Cortés (on loan from Cruz Azul)
—	DF	MEX	Sergio Pérez (from Monterrey)
—	FW	MEX	Miguel Sabah (from Morelia)

Out: Note: Flags indicate national team as defined under FIFA eligibility rules; some limited exceptions apply. Players may hold more than one non-FIFA nationality.

No.	Pos.	Nation	Player
6	DF	MEX	Omar Esparza (on loan to San Luis)
9	FW	MEX	Omar Arellano (to Monterrey)
11	MF	MEX	Julio Nava (to Querétaro)
15	FW	MEX	Jesús Padilla (to La Piedad)
18	MF	MEX	Xavier Báez (to Toluca)
23	FW	MEX	Michel Vázquez (to Pumas Morelos)
24	DF	MEX	Juan Ocampo (on loan to Sinaloa)
25	MF	MEX	Antonio Gallardo (on loan to Querétaro)
27	DF	MEX	Christian Pérez (on loan to Querétaro)
29	DF	MEX	Diego Martinez (on loan to Querétaro)
30	GK	MEX	Liborio Sánchez (to Querétaro)
––	MF	MEX	Jorge Mora (on loan to Cruz Azul Hidalgo, previously on loan at Correcaminos UAT)
––	MF	MEX	Edgar Mejia (on loan to Chivas USA, previously on loan at Club Leon)

=== León ===
In: Note: Flags indicate national team as defined under FIFA eligibility rules; some limited exceptions apply. Players may hold more than one non-FIFA nationality.

No.	Pos.	Nation	Player
—	DF	MEX	Rafael Márquez (from (United States) New York Red Bulls)
—	MF	MEX	Jorge Zataraín (from Necaxa)
—	FW	COL	Yovanny Arrechea (from (China) Changchun Yatai)
—	FW	MEX	Nery Castillo (on loan from Pachuca)

Out: Note: Flags indicate national team as defined under FIFA eligibility rules; some limited exceptions apply. Players may hold more than one non-FIFA nationality.

No.	Pos.	Nation	Player
2	DF	ARG	Javier Muñoz Mustafá (to San Luis)
11	FW	MEX	Luis Nieves (on loan to Tecos)
17	MF	MEX	Saúl Villalobos (loan return to Atlas)
26	MF	MEX	Julio Ceja (on loan to Tecos)

=== Monterrey ===
In: Note: Flags indicate national team as defined under FIFA eligibility rules; some limited exceptions apply. Players may hold more than one non-FIFA nationality.

No.	Pos.	Nation	Player
—	DF	MEX	Leobardo López (from Pachuca)
—	FW	MEX	Omar Arellano (from Guadalajara)

Out: Note: Flags indicate national team as defined under FIFA eligibility rules; some limited exceptions apply. Players may hold more than one non-FIFA nationality.

No.	Pos.	Nation	Player
3	DF	MEX	Alejandro Molina (on loan to Correcaminos UAT)
10	MF	MEX	Ángel Reyna (on loan to Pachuca)
13	FW	MEX	Abraham Carreño (to Pachuca)
24	DF	MEX	Sergio Pérez (to Guadalajara)
––	MF	MEX	Alejandro Berber (on loan to Correcaminos UAT, previously on loan at Veracruz)
––	MF	MEX	Marvin Piñón (on loan to Altamira, previously on loan at Querétaro)

=== Morelia ===
In: Note: Flags indicate national team as defined under FIFA eligibility rules; some limited exceptions apply. Players may hold more than one non-FIFA nationality.

No.	Pos.	Nation	Player
—	MF	MEX	José María Cárdenas (from América)
—	MF	MEX	Fernando Morales (from UNAM)
—	FW	CHI	Héctor Mancilla (from Atlas)
—	FW	MEX	Sergio Santana (from Atlas)

Out: Note: Flags indicate national team as defined under FIFA eligibility rules; some limited exceptions apply. Players may hold more than one non-FIFA nationality.

No.	Pos.	Nation	Player
5	DF	ARG	Mauricio Romero (to (Argentina) Colón)
9	FW	MEX	Miguel Sabah (to Guadalajara)
15	DF	MEX	Óscar Razo (to Atlas)
83	GK	MEX	Guillermo Pozos (on loan to Pumas Morelos)
––	MF	MEX	Jorge Gastélum (on loan to Chiapas, previously on loan at Puebla)
––	FW	COL	Edison Toloza (to (Colombia) Junior, previously on loan at Puebla)

=== Pachuca ===
In: Note: Flags indicate national team as defined under FIFA eligibility rules; some limited exceptions apply. Players may hold more than one non-FIFA nationality.

No.	Pos.	Nation	Player
—	DF	MEX	Fernando Navarro (from UANL)
—	MF	MEX	Jaime Correa (from San Luis)
—	MF	COL	Áviles Hurtado (from (Colombia) Atlético Nacional)
—	MF	PER	Pier Larrauri (on loan from (England) Leicester City)
—	MF	ARG	Daniel Ludueña (from Santos Laguna)
—	MF	COL	Cristian Marrugo (from (Colombia) Deportes Tolima)
—	MF	MEX	Ángel Reyna (on loan from Monterrey)
—	MF	ECU	Christian Suárez (from Santos Laguna)
—	FW	MEX	Abraham Carreño (from Monterrey)
—	FW	ARG	Fernando Cavenaghi (from (Spain) Villarreal)
—	FW	CRC	Henry Cooper (on loan from (Costa Rica) Limón)

Out: Note: Flags indicate national team as defined under FIFA eligibility rules; some limited exceptions apply. Players may hold more than one non-FIFA nationality.

No.	Pos.	Nation	Player
2	DF	MEX	Leobardo López (to Monterrey)
7	MF	MEX	Alberto Medina (to Puebla)
10	MF	ARG	Mauro Cejas (to Santos Laguna)
11	MF	MEX	Néstor Calderón (to Santos Laguna)
14	MF	ECU	Segundo Castillo (to Puebla)
18	MF	USA	José Francisco Torres (to UANL)
19	FW	ECU	Félix Borja (to Puebla)
21	FW	MEX	Nery Castillo (on loan to León)
23	FW	ESP	Raúl Tamudo (to (Spain) Rayo Vallecano)
25	MF	MEX	Luis Sánchez (on loan to Tecos)
26	MF	MEX	Miguel Velásquez (on loan to Tecos)

=== Puebla ===
In: Note: Flags indicate national team as defined under FIFA eligibility rules; some limited exceptions apply. Players may hold more than one non-FIFA nationality.

No.	Pos.	Nation	Player
—	GK	MEX	Guillermo Iriarte (from (Uruguay) Progreso)
—	DF	URU	Jonathan Lacerda (from Santos Laguna, previously on loan at Necaxa)
—	DF	USA	Michael Orozco (from San Luis)
—	DF	MEX	William Paredes (from San Luis)
—	MF	MEX	Alberto Medina (from Pachuca)
—	MF	ECU	Segundo Castillo (from Pachuca)
—	MF	MEX	Luis Miguel Noriega (from Chiapas)
—	FW	ECU	Félix Borja (from Pachuca)
—	FW	MEX	Emmanuel Cerda (from San Luis)

Out: Note: Flags indicate national team as defined under FIFA eligibility rules; some limited exceptions apply. Players may hold more than one non-FIFA nationality.

No.	Pos.	Nation	Player
—	DF	MEX	Diego Cervantes (on loan to Querétaro)
2	DF	MEX	Orlando Rincón (to San Luis)
5	MF	MEX	Jorge Gastélum (loan return to Morelia)
7	DF	MEX	Jair García (to Mérida)
8	DF	MEX	Aldo Polo (to Correcaminos UAT)
10	MF	ARG	Matías Abelairas (loan return to (Brazil) Vasco da Gama)
13	DF	PAR	Herminio Miranda (to (Paraguay) Olimpia)
14	FW	COL	Edison Toloza (loan return to Morelia)
15	FW	MEX	Mario Ortiz (to San Luis)
17	FW	MEX	Bernardo Sainz (on loan to Pumas Morelos)
27	DF	MEX	Francisco Pizano (on loan to U de G)

=== Querétaro ===
In: Note: Flags indicate national team as defined under FIFA eligibility rules; some limited exceptions apply. Players may hold more than one non-FIFA nationality.

No.	Pos.	Nation	Player
—	GK	MEX	Liborio Sánchez (from Guadalajara)
—	GK	MEX	Antonio Pérez (from Atlante)
—	DF	BRA	Apodi (from (Brazil) Ceará)
—	DF	MEX	Diego Cervantes (on loan from Puebla)
—	DF	COL	Oswaldo Henríquez (from (Colombia) Millonarios)
—	DF	MEX	Diego Martinez (on loan from Guadalajara)
—	DF	MEX	Mario Osuna (from Sinaloa)
—	DF	MEX	Christian Pérez (on loan from Guadalajara)
—	MF	PER	Juan Carlos Mariño (from (Peru) Sporting Cristal)
—	MF	ARG	Pablo Gabas (on loan from (Costa Rica) Alajuelense)
—	MF	MEX	Antonio Gallardo (on loan from Guadalajara)
—	MF	MEX	Julio Nava (from Guadalajara)
—	MF	COL	Omar Vásquez (from (Colombia) Millonarios)
—	FW	COL	Wilberto Cosme (from (Colombia) Millonarios)
—	FW	MEX	David Izazola (on loan from UNAM)

Out: Note: Flags indicate national team as defined under FIFA eligibility rules; some limited exceptions apply. Players may hold more than one non-FIFA nationality.

No.	Pos.	Nation	Player
2	DF	COL	Efraín Cortés (to (Uruguay) Nacional)
10	FW	URU	Diego Vera (to (Argentina) Atlético Rafaela)
15	MF	URU	Diego Guastavino (to (Peru) Universitario de Deportes)
17	DF	MEX	Daniel Alcántar (on loan to Necaxa)
20	FW	URU	Carlos Bueno (to (Chile) Universidad Católica)
23	FW	MEX	Alberto García (to Atlante)
26	DF	MEX	Leonel Olmedo (to Irapuato)
31	FW	MEX	Armando Pulido (loan return to UANL)
33	MF	MEX	David Stringel (loan return to UANL)
36	MF	MEX	Marvin Piñón (loan return to Monterrey)
37	FW	MEX	Juan Carlos Enríquez (loan return to Santos Laguna)

=== San Luis ===
In: Note: Flags indicate national team as defined under FIFA eligibility rules; some limited exceptions apply. Players may hold more than one non-FIFA nationality.

No.	Pos.	Nation	Player
—	DF	MEX	Yasser Corona (from Chiapas)
6	DF	MEX	Omar Esparza (on loan from Guadalajara)
—	DF	MEX	Ricardo Jiménez (from Atlante)
—	DF	ARG	Javier Muñoz Mustafá (from León)
—	DF	MEX	Álvaro Ortiz (from Lobos de la BUAP)
—	DF	MEX	Aldo Polo (from Puebla)
—	DF	MEX	Orlando Rincón (from Puebla)
—	MF	MEX	Francisco Acuña (from UANL)
—	MF	COL	Jhersson Córdoba (from (Colombia) Atlético Nacional)
—	MF	ARG	Juan Cuevas (from (Argentina) Gimnasia y Esgrima de La Plata)
—	MF	MEX	Alan Zamora (from Chiapas)
—	FW	ARG	Mauro Matos (on loan from (Argentina) All Boys)
—	FW	MEX	Mario Ortiz (from Puebla)

Out: Note: Flags indicate national team as defined under FIFA eligibility rules; some limited exceptions apply. Players may hold more than one non-FIFA nationality.

No.	Pos.	Nation	Player
3	DF	MEX	Cesar Saldivar (on loan to Sinaloa)
6	MF	MEX	Jaime Correa (to Pachuca)
8	FW	URU	Sebastián Fernández (to (Peru) Universitario de Deportes)
10	FW	PER	Wilmer Aguirre (to (Peru) Alianza Lima)
13	DF	MEX	William Paredes (to Puebla)
16	DF	USA	Michael Orozco (to Puebla)
21	MF	MEX	Noé Maya (on loan to Tijuana)
22	FW	MEX	Emmanuel Cerda (to Puebla)
23	MF	MEX	Juan Carlos Silva (on loan to Irapuato)
27	DF	MEX	Diego Ordaz (loan return to Atlante)
33	DF	MEX	José Antonio Castro (to Atlante)
––	DF	MEX	Leonel Olmedo (on loan to Irapuato, previously on loan at Querétaro)
––	FW	MEX	Fausto Ruiz (on loan to Lobos BUAP, previously on loan at Sinaloa)

=== Santos Laguna ===
In: Note: Flags indicate national team as defined under FIFA eligibility rules; some limited exceptions apply. Players may hold more than one non-FIFA nationality.

No.	Pos.	Nation	Player
—	MF	MEX	Néstor Calderón (from Pachuca)
—	MF	ARG	Mauro Cejas (from Pachuca)
—	FW	COL	Andrés Rentería (from (Colombia) Alianza Petrolera)

Out: Note: Flags indicate national team as defined under FIFA eligibility rules; some limited exceptions apply. Players may hold more than one non-FIFA nationality.

No.	Pos.	Nation	Player
10	MF	ARG	Daniel Ludueña (to Pachuca)
13	MF	ECU	Christian Suárez (to Pachuca)
58	FW	MEX	Daniel Guzmán Jr (on loan to U de G)
65	FW	MEX	Alonso Escoboza (on loan to Necaxa)
––	DF	ARG	Santiago Hoyos (unregistered, to (Argentina) San Martín de San Juan)
––	FW	MEX	Juan Carlos Enríquez (to (El Salvador) FAS, previously on loan at Querétaro)
––	FW	MEX	Agustín Herrera (on loan to Altamira, previously on loan at Tiburones Rojos de Veracruz)

=== Tijuana ===
In: Note: Flags indicate national team as defined under FIFA eligibility rules; some limited exceptions apply. Players may hold more than one non-FIFA nationality.

No.	Pos.	Nation	Player
—	MF	MEX	Noé Maya (on loan from San Luis)
—	FW	MEX	Daniel Márquez (on loan from América, previously on loan at Club Necaxa)

Out: Note: Flags indicate national team as defined under FIFA eligibility rules; some limited exceptions apply. Players may hold more than one non-FIFA nationality.

No.	Pos.	Nation	Player
—	MF	MEX	Adolfo Domínguez (on loan to Sinaloa)

=== Toluca ===
In: Note: Flags indicate national team as defined under FIFA eligibility rules; some limited exceptions apply. Players may hold more than one non-FIFA nationality.

No.	Pos.	Nation	Player
—	DF	MEX	Fausto Pinto (from Cruz Azul)
—	MF	MEX	Xavier Báez (from Guadalajara)
—	MF	MEX	Flavio Santos (on loan from Atlas)

Out: Note: Flags indicate national team as defined under FIFA eligibility rules; some limited exceptions apply. Players may hold more than one non-FIFA nationality.

No.	Pos.	Nation	Player
18	MF	MEX	Isaac Brizuela (on loan to Atlas)
20	MF	MEX	Arturo Paganoni (loan return to Atlas)
––	DF	URU	Iván Alonso (unregistered, to (Uruguay) Nacional)

=== UANL ===
In: Note: Flags indicate national team as defined under FIFA eligibility rules; some limited exceptions apply. Players may hold more than one non-FIFA nationality.

No.	Pos.	Nation	Player
—	DF	MEX	Hugo Rodríguez (from Atlas)
—	MF	BRA	Danilinho (loan return from (Brazil) Atlético Mineiro)
—	MF	USA	José Francisco Torres (from Pachuca)
—	FW	ARG	Emanuel Villa (from UNAM)

Out: Note: Flags indicate national team as defined under FIFA eligibility rules; some limited exceptions apply. Players may hold more than one non-FIFA nationality.

No.	Pos.	Nation	Player
5	DF	MEX	Eder Borelli (on loan to Correcaminos UAT)
14	DF	MEX	Fernando Navarro (to Pachuca)
17	MF	MEX	David Toledo (to Chiapas)
18	MF	MEX	Francisco Acuña (to San Luis)
31	MF	BRA	Edno (on loan to (Japan) Cerezo Osaka)
––	FW	MEX	Armando Pulido (on loan to Correcaminos UAT, previously on loan at Querétaro)
––	MF	MEX	David Stringel (on loan to Toros Neza, previously on loan at Querétaro)

=== UNAM ===
In: Note: Flags indicate national team as defined under FIFA eligibility rules; some limited exceptions apply. Players may hold more than one non-FIFA nationality.

No.	Pos.	Nation	Player
—	DF	MEX	Ignacio González (from Toros Neza)
—	FW	PAR	Robin Ramírez (from (Paraguay) Libertad, previously on loan at (Colombia) Deportes Tolima)
—	MF	URU	Juan Pablo Rodríguez (from (Argentina) All Boys)

Out: Note: Flags indicate national team as defined under FIFA eligibility rules; some limited exceptions apply. Players may hold more than one non-FIFA nationality.

No.	Pos.	Nation	Player
9	FW	ARG	Emanuel Villa (to UANL)
19	MF	MEX	Fernando Morales (to Morelia)
23	MF	MEX	Fernando Santana (on loan to La Piedad)
28	FW	MEX	David Izazola (on loan to Querétaro)

== See also ==
- 2012–13 Liga MX season
