= List of Mexican football transfers winter 2013–14 =

This is a list of Mexican football transfers in the Mexican Primera División during the winter 2013–14 transfer window, grouped by club. It only includes football transfers related to clubs from Liga MX, the first division of Mexican football.

== Mexican Primera División ==
=== América ===
In: Note: Flags indicate national team as defined under FIFA eligibility rules; some limited exceptions apply. Players may hold more than one non-FIFA nationality.

No.	Pos.	Nation	Player
7	FW	ARG	Andrés Ríos (from (Argentina) River Plate, previously on loan at (Ecuador) Deportivo Cuenca)
21	DF	PAR	Pablo Aguilar (from Tijuana)

Out: Note: Flags indicate national team as defined under FIFA eligibility rules; some limited exceptions apply. Players may hold more than one non-FIFA nationality.

No.	Pos.	Nation	Player
7	FW	ECU	Narciso Mina (to Atlante)
18	MF	MEX	Christian Bermúdez (to Querétaro)
73	DF	MEX	Gil Burón (on loan to Querétaro)
––	MF	MEX	José María Cárdenas (on loan to León, previously on loan at Morelia)

=== Atlante ===
In: Note: Flags indicate national team as defined under FIFA eligibility rules; some limited exceptions apply. Players may hold more than one non-FIFA nationality.

No.	Pos.	Nation	Player
9	FW	ECU	Michael Arroyo (loan return from (Ecuador) Barcelona SC)
10	FW	CHI	Roberto Gutiérrez (from (Chile) Palestino)
14	DF	MEX	Alonso Zamora (on loan from UANL)
17	FW	ECU	Narciso Mina (from América)
18	MF	USA	Jonathan Bornstein (on loan from UANL)
19	DF	PAR	Salustiano Candia (on loan from (Paraguay) Olimpia)
20	FW	MEX	Guillermo Madrigal (on loan from Monterrey)
23	MF	MEX	Manuel Viniegra (on loan from UANL)
25	MF	MEX	Gael Acosta (on loan from Monterrey)
29	DF	MEX	Arturo Muñoz (unattached)

Out: Note: Flags indicate national team as defined under FIFA eligibility rules; some limited exceptions apply. Players may hold more than one non-FIFA nationality.

No.	Pos.	Nation	Player
9	FW	ARG	Roberto Nanni (released)
10	MF	ARG	Walter Erviti (to (Argentina) Banfield)
14	FW	MEX	Francisco Fonseca (to (Costa Rica) Santos de Guápiles)
17	FW	MEX	Diego Jiménez (released)
18	MF	MEX	Guillermo Rojas (to Necaxa)
20	FW	MEX	Ezequiel Orozco (loan return to Necaxa)
25	FW	ARG	Ezequiel Miralles (to (Argentina) Olimpo)
29	DF	MEX	Diego García (released)
––	MF	CPV	Valdo (to (Greece) Asteras Tripolis, previously on loan at (Spain) Levante)

=== Atlas ===
In: Note: Flags indicate national team as defined under FIFA eligibility rules; some limited exceptions apply. Players may hold more than one non-FIFA nationality.

No.	Pos.	Nation	Player
1	GK	ARG	Federico Vilar (from Morelia)
6	DF	MEX	Enrique Pérez (on loan from Morelia)
8	MF	MEX	Jorge Gastélum (on loan from Morelia, previously on loan at Pachuca)
9	FW	PAR	José Ortigoza (from (Paraguay) Cerro Porteño)
10	FW	BRA	Maikon Leite (on loan from (Brazil) Palmeiras, previously on loan at (Brazil) Náutico)
33	GK	MEX	Higinio Bucio (from Morelia)

Out: Note: Flags indicate national team as defined under FIFA eligibility rules; some limited exceptions apply. Players may hold more than one non-FIFA nationality.

No.	Pos.	Nation	Player
1	GK	CHI	Miguel Pinto (to UAT)
6	MF	MEX	Luis Fernando Télles (to UDG)
8	MF	MEX	Lucas Ayala (to UAT)
9	FW	MEX	Omar Bravo (loan return to Guadalajara)
10	MF	BOL	José Luis Chávez (to (Bolivia) Blooming)
13	MF	MEX	Gregorio Torres (released)
18	MF	MEX	Arturo Paganoni (released)
19	MF	MEX	Saúl Villalobos (on loan to Puebla)

=== Chiapas ===
In: Note: Flags indicate national team as defined under FIFA eligibility rules; some limited exceptions apply. Players may hold more than one non-FIFA nationality.

No.	Pos.	Nation	Player
4	MF	USA	Gabriel Farfan (on loan from (United States) Chivas USA)
7	MF	MEX	Luis Ernesto Pérez (on loan from Guadalajara, previously on loan at Querétaro)
13	DF	MEX	Juan Carlos Rojas (on loan from Pachuca)
25	FW	COL	Wilberto Cosme (from (Colombia) Bogotá, previously on loan at Querétaro)
26	MF	MEX	Giovani Casillas (on loan from Guadalajara)
29	MF	MEX	Julio Nava (on loan from Querétaro)
32	MF	CRC	Pablo Gabas (from (Costa Rica) Alajuelense, previously on loan at Querétaro)
33	DF	BRA	Bruno Pires (from (Brazil) Figueirense)
––	DF	COL	Oswaldo Henríquez (from Querétaro, unregistered)

Out: Note: Flags indicate national team as defined under FIFA eligibility rules; some limited exceptions apply. Players may hold more than one non-FIFA nationality.

No.	Pos.	Nation	Player
4	DF	MEX	Uriel Álvarez (loan return to Santos Laguna)
7	MF	MEX	Moisés Velasco (loan return to Toluca)
13	DF	MEX	Ricardo Balderas (released)
25	MF	ARG	Iván Bella (to Puebla)
26	DF	MEX	Roberto Juárez (to Querétaro)
28	MF	MEX	Francisco Torres (loan return to Santos Laguna)
––	DF	COL	Oswaldo Henríquez (released)
––	FW	ARG	Alfredo Moreno (on loan to Veracruz, previously on loan at Puebla)

=== Cruz Azul ===
In: Note: Flags indicate national team as defined under FIFA eligibility rules; some limited exceptions apply. Players may hold more than one non-FIFA nationality.

No.	Pos.	Nation	Player
2	DF	MEX	Fausto Pinto (from Toluca)
8	MF	MEX	Marco Fabián (on loan from Guadalajara)
21	MF	MEX	Xavier Báez (loan return from Toluca)
22	MF	MEX	Rafael Baca (from (United States) San Jose Earthquakes)
23	MF	USA	Michael Farfán (from (United States) Philadelphia Union)
24	FW	USA	José Villarreal (on loan from (United States) Los Angeles Galaxy)
53	DF	MEX	Horacio Cervantes (from Cruz Azul Hidalgo, previously on loan at Necaxa)
70	FW	MEX	Ismael Valadéz (from Cruz Azul Hidalgo)

Out: Note: Flags indicate national team as defined under FIFA eligibility rules; some limited exceptions apply. Players may hold more than one non-FIFA nationality.

No.	Pos.	Nation	Player
8	MF	MEX	Israel Castro (to Guadalajara)
16	DF	MEX	Jair Pereira (to Guadalajara)
77	DF	MEX	Francisco Flores (on loan to Guadalajara)
––	MF	MEX	Héctor Gutiérrez (to Cruz Azul Hidalgo, previously on loan)

=== Guadalajara ===
In: Note: Flags indicate national team as defined under FIFA eligibility rules; some limited exceptions apply. Players may hold more than one non-FIFA nationality.

No.	Pos.	Nation	Player
4	DF	MEX	Jair Pereira (from Cruz Azul)
9	FW	MEX	Omar Bravo (loan return from Atlas)
16	DF	MEX	Gerardo Rodríguez (on loan from Toluca)
19	MF	MEX	Julio Gómez (on loan from Pachuca)
20	MF	MEX	Israel Castro (from Cruz Azul)
31	DF	MEX	Francisco Flores (on loan from Cruz Azul)
35	FW	MEX	Julio Morales (loan return from (United States) Chivas USA)
––	DF	MEX	Jaime Frías Jr. (loan return from (United States) Chivas USA)

Out: Note: Flags indicate national team as defined under FIFA eligibility rules; some limited exceptions apply. Players may hold more than one non-FIFA nationality.

No.	Pos.	Nation	Player
1	GK	MEX	Luis Michel (on loan to (Costa Rica) Saprissa)
4	DF	MEX	Héctor Reynoso (on loan to Morelia)
9	FW	MEX	Miguel Sabah (to León)
10	MF	MEX	Marco Fabián (on loan to Cruz Azul)
16	DF	MEX	Miguel Ponce (on loan to Toluca)
20	MF	MEX	Giovani Casillas (on loan to Chiapas)
31	DF	MEX	Juan Basulto (on loan to UDG)
34	MF	MEX	Raúl López (on loan to UAT)
129	DF	USA	Juan Pablo Ocegueda (loan return to UANL)
130	DF	MEX	Abel Fuentes (loan return to UANL)
––	DF	MEX	Jaime Frías Jr. (on loan to (United States) Indy Eleven)
––	DF	MEX	Mario de Luna (on loan to Puebla, previously on loan at (United States) Chivas USA)
––	MF	MEX	Édgar Mejía (on loan to Puebla, previously on loan at (United States) Chivas USA)
––	MF	MEX	Luis Ernesto Pérez (on loan to Chiapas, previously on loan at Querétaro)

=== León ===
In: Note: Flags indicate national team as defined under FIFA eligibility rules; some limited exceptions apply. Players may hold more than one non-FIFA nationality.

No.	Pos.	Nation	Player
1	FW	MEX	Miguel Sabah (from Guadalajara)
6	MF	MEX	José María Cárdenas (on loan from América, previously on loan at Morelia)

Out: Note: Flags indicate national team as defined under FIFA eligibility rules; some limited exceptions apply. Players may hold more than one non-FIFA nationality.

No.	Pos.	Nation	Player
18	MF	COL	Darío Burbano (to UANL)

=== Monterrey ===
In: Note: Flags indicate national team as defined under FIFA eligibility rules; some limited exceptions apply. Players may hold more than one non-FIFA nationality.

No.	Pos.	Nation	Player
8	FW	COL	Wilson Morelo (from (Colombia) La Equidad)
14	FW	MEX	Othoniel Arce (loan return from Pachuca)
16	MF	MEX	Cándido Ramírez (on loan from Santos Laguna, previously on loan at UNAM)
31	DF	BRA	Victor Ramos (from (Belgium) Standard Liège, previously on loan at (Brazil) Vitória)

Out: Note: Flags indicate national team as defined under FIFA eligibility rules; some limited exceptions apply. Players may hold more than one non-FIFA nationality.

No.	Pos.	Nation	Player
11	FW	MEX	Guillermo Madrigal (on loan to Atlante)
34	MF	MEX	Gael Acosta (on loan to Atlante)

=== Morelia ===
In: Note: Flags indicate national team as defined under FIFA eligibility rules; some limited exceptions apply. Players may hold more than one non-FIFA nationality.

No.	Pos.	Nation	Player
2	DF	MEX	Ignacio González (from UNAM)
3	DF	MEX	Héctor Reynoso (on loan from Guadalajara)
7	MF	URU	Egidio Arévalo Ríos (on loan from UANL)
11	MF	MEX	Luis Ángel Morales (from Pachuca)
12	GK	MEX	Alexandro Álvarez (from Cruz Azul Hidalgo)
15	MF	MEX	Francisco Acuña (unattached)
20	FW	COL	Duvier Riascos (from Pachuca)
21	GK	MEX	Fabián Villaseñor (unattached)
23	DF	PAN	Felipe Baloy (from Santos Laguna)
25	MF	MEX	Jorge Sánchez (from San Luis)
31	FW	MEX	Óscar Fernández (from Altamira)

Out: Note: Flags indicate national team as defined under FIFA eligibility rules; some limited exceptions apply. Players may hold more than one non-FIFA nationality.

No.	Pos.	Nation	Player
2	DF	MEX	Enrique Pérez (on loan to Atlas)
3	GK	ARG	Federico Vilar (to Atlas)
7	MF	MEX	José María Cárdenas (loan return to América)
11	MF	MEX	Édgar Andrade (to Pachuca)
12	GK	MEX	Higinio Bucio (to Atlas)
20	FW	COL	Santiago Tréllez (on loan to (Colombia) Atlético Nacional)
21	MF	ECU	Juan José Govea (loan return to (Ecuador) El Nacional)
––	DF	MEX	Carlos Guzmán (on loan to Puebla, previously on loan at San Luis)
––	MF	MEX	Jorge Gastélum (on loan to Atlas, previously on loan at Pachuca)

=== Pachuca ===
In: Note: Flags indicate national team as defined under FIFA eligibility rules; some limited exceptions apply. Players may hold more than one non-FIFA nationality.

No.	Pos.	Nation	Player
6	MF	MEX	Diego de Buen (from Puebla)
10	MF	ECU	Alex Colón (from (Ecuador) Deportivo Quito)
13	MF	MEX	Édgar Andrade (from Morelia)
14	MF	ECU	Enner Valencia (from (Ecuador) Emelec)
26	MF	COL	John Pajoy (from (Colombia) Atlético Nacional)
27	DF	MEX	Hugo Rodríguez (on loan from UANL)
28	MF	MEX	Alberto Acosta (on loan from UANL)
––	FW	ARG	Ariel Nahuelpan (from UNAM)

Out: Note: Flags indicate national team as defined under FIFA eligibility rules; some limited exceptions apply. Players may hold more than one non-FIFA nationality.

No.	Pos.	Nation	Player
4	DF	MEX	Iván Estrada (to UANL)
7	MF	ECU	Christian Suárez (on loan to (Ecuador) Barcelona SC)
10	MF	ARG	Daniel Ludueña (to UNAM)
12	DF	MEX	Juan Carlos Rojas (on loan to Chiapas)
13	MF	MEX	Jorge Gastélum (loan return to Morelia)
14	MF	MEX	Luis Ángel Morales (to Morelia)
18	MF	MEX	Julio Gómez (on loan to Guadalajara)
23	FW	COL	Duvier Riascos (to Morelia)
26	FW	ARG	Fernando Cavenaghi (to (Argentina) River Plate)
27	FW	MEX	Othoniel Arce (loan return to Monterrey)
28	MF	MEX	Juan José Calderón (to Linces de Tlaxcala)
29	FW	MEX	Marco Bueno (on loan to Estudiantes Tecos)
––	MF	COL	Cristian Marrugo (to (Colombia) Deportivo Cali, previously on loan at Veracruz)
––	FW	ARG	Ariel Nahuelpan (on loan to (Argentina) Tigre)

=== Puebla ===
In: Note: Flags indicate national team as defined under FIFA eligibility rules; some limited exceptions apply. Players may hold more than one non-FIFA nationality.

No.	Pos.	Nation	Player
2	FW	BRA	Maicon Santos (from (United States) Chicago Fire)
5	DF	MEX	Carlos Guzmán (on loan from Morelia, previously on loan at San Luis)
6	MF	MEX	Édgar Mejía (on loan from Guadalajara, previously on loan at (United States) Chivas USA)
8	MF	MEX	Alan Zamora (on loan from Querétaro)
9	FW	MEX	Daniel Guzmán Jr. (on loan from Santos Laguna, previously on loan at Ballenas Galeana)
10	MF	ARG	Iván Bella (from Chiapas)
19	FW	MEX	Juan Carlos Cacho (on loan from UNAM, previously on loan at Toluca)
28	MF	MEX	Francisco Torres (on loan from Santos Laguna, previously on loan at Chiapas)
29	DF	MEX	Juan de la Barrera (from UAT, previously on loan at Zacatepec)
35	MF	MEX	Saúl Villalobos (on loan from Atlas)
39	DF	MEX	Mario de Luna (on loan from Guadalajara, previously on loan at (United States) Chivas USA)
57	DF	MEX	Uriel Álvarez (on loan from Santos Laguna, previously on loan at Chiapas)

Out: Note: Flags indicate national team as defined under FIFA eligibility rules; some limited exceptions apply. Players may hold more than one non-FIFA nationality.

No.	Pos.	Nation	Player
2	DF	URU	Jonathan Lacerda (loan return to Santos Laguna)
5	MF	MEX	Leandro Augusto (to UNAM)
6	MF	MEX	Diego de Buen (to Pachuca)
9	FW	ECU	Félix Borja (to (Ecuador) LDU Quito)
10	FW	ARG	Alfredo Moreno (loan return to Chiapas)
19	DF	MEX	Rodrigo Íñigo (to Estudiantes Tecos)
29	MF	MEX	Hiber Ruíz (to Lobos BUAP)
––	FW	MEX	Diego Vera (unregistered, released)

=== Querétaro ===
In: Note: Flags indicate national team as defined under FIFA eligibility rules; some limited exceptions apply. Players may hold more than one non-FIFA nationality.

No.	Pos.	Nation	Player
3	DF	ARG	Miguel Martínez (unattached)
7	FW	BRA	Camilo Sanvezzo (from (Canada) Vancouver Whitecaps)
10	FW	BRA	Ricardo Jesus (from (Russia) CSKA Moscow, previously on loan at (Brazil) Atlético Goianiense)
11	MF	BRA	William (from (South Korea) Busan IPark)
12	MF	MEX	Christian Bermúdez (from América)
13	MF	MEX	Moisés Velasco (on loan from Toluca, previously on loan at Chiapas)
20	MF	MEX	Rodolfo Vilchis (from Delfines)
26	DF	MEX	Roberto Juárez (from Chiapas)
28	MF	URU	Diego Guastavino (loan return from (Peru) Universitario)
30	FW	MEX	Víctor Guajardo (from San Luis)
33	GK	MEX	Miguel Fraga (from Delfines)
60	DF	MEX	Gil Burón (on loan from América)

Out: Note: Flags indicate national team as defined under FIFA eligibility rules; some limited exceptions apply. Players may hold more than one non-FIFA nationality.

No.	Pos.	Nation	Player
1	GK	MEX	Liborio Sánchez (to Delfines)
3	DF	COL	Oswaldo Henríquez (to Chiapas)
7	MF	MEX	Luis Ernesto Pérez (loan return to Guadalajara)
10	FW	CHI	Esteban Paredes (to (Chile) Colo-Colo)
11	MF	MEX	Jorge Echavarría (to Delfines)
12	MF	CRC	Pablo Gabas (loan return to (Costa Rica) Alajuelense)
13	MF	MEX	Alan Zamora (on loan to Puebla)
20	DF	BRA	Apodi (to Delfines)
24	FW	COL	Wilberto Cosme (loan return to (Colombia) Bogotá)
25	MF	ARG	Leandro Gracián (released)
29	MF	MEX	Julio Nava (on loan to Chiapas)

=== Santos Laguna ===
In: Note: Flags indicate national team as defined under FIFA eligibility rules; some limited exceptions apply. Players may hold more than one non-FIFA nationality.

No.	Pos.	Nation	Player
18	DF	URU	Jonathan Lacerda (loan return from Puebla)
25	MF	URU	Ribair Rodríguez (from (Italy) Siena, previously on loan at (Argentina) Boca Juniors)

Out: Note: Flags indicate national team as defined under FIFA eligibility rules; some limited exceptions apply. Players may hold more than one non-FIFA nationality.

No.	Pos.	Nation	Player
23	DF	PAN	Felipe Baloy (to Morelia)
––	DF	MEX	Uriel Álvarez (on loan to Puebla, previously on loan at Chiapas)
––	MF	MEX	Francisco Torres (on loan to Puebla, previously on loan at Chiapas)
––	MF	MEX	Cándido Ramírez (on loan to Monterrey, previously on loan at UNAM)
––	FW	MEX	Daniel Guzmán Jr. (on loan to Puebla, previously on loan at Ballenas Galeana)

=== Tijuana ===
In: Note: Flags indicate national team as defined under FIFA eligibility rules; some limited exceptions apply. Players may hold more than one non-FIFA nationality.

No.	Pos.	Nation	Player
4	DF	ARG	Hernán Pellerano (from (Spain) Almería)
17	FW	ECU	Jaime Ayoví (loan return from (Ecuador) LDU Quito)

Out: Note: Flags indicate national team as defined under FIFA eligibility rules; some limited exceptions apply. Players may hold more than one non-FIFA nationality.

No.	Pos.	Nation	Player
6	DF	PAR	Pablo Aguilar (to América)

=== Toluca ===
In: Note: Flags indicate national team as defined under FIFA eligibility rules; some limited exceptions apply. Players may hold more than one non-FIFA nationality.

No.	Pos.	Nation	Player
6	DF	MEX	Miguel Ponce (on loan from Guadalajara)
17	FW	URU	Juan Manuel Salgueiro (from (Paraguay) Olimpia)
18	MF	MEX	Emilio Orrantía (on loan from UNAM)

Out: Note: Flags indicate national team as defined under FIFA eligibility rules; some limited exceptions apply. Players may hold more than one non-FIFA nationality.

No.	Pos.	Nation	Player
3	DF	MEX	Fausto Pinto (to Cruz Azul)
6	DF	MEX	Gerardo Rodríguez (on loan to Guadalajara)
9	FW	MEX	Juan Carlos Cacho (loan return to UNAM)
18	MF	MEX	Xavier Báez (loan return to Cruz Azul)
24	MF	PAR	Richard Ortiz (unregistered)
––	MF	MEX	Moisés Velasco (on loan to Querétaro, previously on loan at Chiapas)
––	FW	PAN	Luis Tejada (to (Peru) César Vallejo, previously on loan at Veracruz)

=== UANL ===
In: Note: Flags indicate national team as defined under FIFA eligibility rules; some limited exceptions apply. Players may hold more than one non-FIFA nationality.

No.	Pos.	Nation	Player
8	MF	COL	Darío Burbano (from León)
9	FW	ARG	Emanuel Herrera (on loan from (France) Montpellier)
14	DF	MEX	Iván Estrada (from Pachuca)
35	DF	USA	Juan Pablo Ocegueda (loan return from Guadalajara)
39	DF	MEX	Abel Fuentes (loan return from Guadalajara)
––	MF	URU	Egidio Arévalo Ríos (from (United States) Chicago Fire)

Out: Note: Flags indicate national team as defined under FIFA eligibility rules; some limited exceptions apply. Players may hold more than one non-FIFA nationality.

No.	Pos.	Nation	Player
8	MF	USA	Jonathan Bornstein (on loan to Atlante)
15	MF	MEX	Manuel Viniegra (on loan to Atlante)
23	DF	MEX	Alonso Zamora (on loan to Atlante)
27	DF	MEX	Hugo Rodríguez (on loan to Pachuca)
28	MF	MEX	Alberto Acosta (on loan to Pachuca)
33	FW	ARG	Emanuel Villa (unregistered)
––	MF	URU	Egidio Arévalo Ríos (on loan to Morelia)

=== UNAM ===
In: Note: Flags indicate national team as defined under FIFA eligibility rules; some limited exceptions apply. Players may hold more than one non-FIFA nationality.

No.	Pos.	Nation	Player
9	FW	PAR	Dante López (from (Paraguay) Olimpia)
11	MF	MEX	Leandro Augusto (from Puebla)
14	FW	ARG	Ismael Sosa (from (Chile) Universidad Católica)
15	MF	ARG	Diego Lagos (from (Argentina) Lanús, previously on loan at (Argentina) Rosario Central)
18	MF	MEX	Fernando Morales (unattached)
20	MF	ARG	Daniel Ludueña (from Pachuca)
27	FW	MEX	David Izazola (unattached)

Out: Note: Flags indicate national team as defined under FIFA eligibility rules; some limited exceptions apply. Players may hold more than one non-FIFA nationality.

No.	Pos.	Nation	Player
9	FW	PAR	Robin Ramírez (to (Colombia) Deportivo Cali)
14	FW	ESP	Luis García (retired)
15	MF	MEX	Cándido Ramírez (loan return to Santos Laguna)
18	MF	MEX	Emilio Orrantía (on loan to Toluca)
20	DF	MEX	Ignacio González (to Morelia)
33	FW	ARG	Ariel Nahuelpan (to Pachuca)
––	FW	MEX	Juan Carlos Cacho (on loan to Puebla, previously on loan at Toluca)

=== Veracruz ===
In: Note: Flags indicate national team as defined under FIFA eligibility rules; some limited exceptions apply. Players may hold more than one non-FIFA nationality.

No.	Pos.	Nation	Player
8	FW	ARG	Alfredo Moreno (on loan from Chiapas)
11	FW	URU	Liber Quiñones (from (Uruguay) Danubio)
12	MF	URU	Maximiliano Bajter (from (Chile) Unión La Calera)

Out: Note: Flags indicate national team as defined under FIFA eligibility rules; some limited exceptions apply. Players may hold more than one non-FIFA nationality.

No.	Pos.	Nation	Player
8	MF	COL	Cristian Marrugo (loan return to Pachuca)
9	FW	PAN	Luis Tejada (loan return to Toluca)
11	FW	MEX	Rafael Murguía (to San Luis)
18	MF	MEX	Israel Martínez (released)
23	MF	MEX	Fernando Santana (to Zacatepec)
30	GK	MEX	Rubén García (released)

== See also ==
- 2013–14 Liga MX season
