= 2011–12 Tiburones Rojos de Veracruz season =

Tiburones Rojos
2011-12 season
- Manager: Daniel Guzmán
- Liga de Ascenso: TBD
- Apertura Liguilla: TBD
- Clausura Liguilla: TBD
- Top goalscorer: (Guatemala) Carlos Ruiz (1)

On June 3, 2011, The FMF disaffiliated the Tiburones Rojos because of a failure of payments to the FMF.

The Federacion Mexicana de Futbol Asociacion, AC informs that the Ordinary General Assembly at its meeting today, once it analyzed the situation of Representaciones Soha, Inc., SA de CV, (Club Veracruz and / or Club Tiburones Rojos de Veracruz), a member of the Liga de Ascenso, The Mexican Football Federation, AC unanimously decided, with its power under Articles 17, 25 and other related and applicable Statute of the FMF, revoke the Certificate of Membership and consequently disaffiliate such an entity, for failing to meet its financial obligations to FMF and its affiliates.

After that announcement, it was accorded between Veracruz and Albinegros de Orizaba to unify their teams after the debts the team had.

The 2011-2012 is the club's 68th year of existence.

== Apertura Squad ==
As of August 1st, 2011.

For recent transfers, see List of Mexican Football Transfers Summer 2011.

Note: Flags indicate national team as defined under FIFA eligibility rules; some limited exceptions apply. Players may hold more than one non-FIFA nationality.

No.	Pos.	Nation	Player
1	GK	MEX	José Rodríguez
2	DF	MEX	Omar Domínguez
3	DF	URU	Alejandro Acosta (Captain)
4	DF	MEX	Miguel Hernández
5	MF	URU	Raúl Ferro
6	DF	MEX	Juan Pablo Montaño
7	MF	MEX	Diego Armando Esqueda
8	MF	MEX	Víctor Manuel Santiago
9	FW	MEX	Daniel Guzmán Miranda
10	FW	MEX	Agustín Herrera
12	GK	MEX	Jorge Bernal
13	MF	MEX	Josymar Moreno
14	DF	MEX	Geovanne Flores

No.	Pos.	Nation	Player
15	MF	MEX	Juan Alberto Ramírez
16	DF	MEX	Luis Eduardo Sánchez
17	DF	MEX	Néstor Olguín
18	FW	MEX	Samer Haj Omar
19	MF	MEX	Faustino Castillo
20	FW	GUA	Carlos Ruiz
21	MF	MEX	Jesús Olivares
23	GK	MEX	Julio César Alarcón
24	FW	MEX	Edgar Bravo
26	MF	MEX	Erik González
30	MF	MEX	Gil Cordero
35	FW	MEX	José Luis Pineda

=== Match results ===
Win Tie Loss

=== Apertura 2011 ===
July 30, 2011 1	Pumas Morelos	2 – 0	Tiburones Rojos	Estadio Centenario, Cuernavaca
16:00	Carlos González 39', 54'			Referee: Gerardo Garcia

August 6, 2011 2	Tiburones Rojos	0 – 2	Irapuato FC	Pirata Fuente, Veracruz
16:00			Estevan Gonzales 50'; Ramon Arriaga 90+'	Referee: Oscar Villagomez

August 14, 2011 3	C.F. La Piedad	2 – 0	Tiburones Rojos	La Piedad, La Piedad
12:30	Eduardo Dos Santos 7'; Roberto Nurse 54'			Referee: Baruch Absalon

August 20, 2011 4	Tiburones Rojos	1 – 0	UAT	Pirata Fuente, Veracruz
16:00	Carlos Ruiz 58'			Referee: Mauricio Martinez

August 27, 2011 5	Tiburones Rojos	1 – 1	Club Celaya	Pirata Fuente, Veracruz
16:00	Raúl Ferro 90+'		Patricio Gomez 11'	Referee: Obed Gomez

September 10, 2011 6	Cruz Azul Hidalgo	1 – 1	Tiburones Rojos	Estadio 10 de Diciembre, Jasso, Hidalgo
12:00	Edgar Martin 50'		Alejandro Acosta 12'	Referee: Leon Barajas

September 17, 2011 7	Tiburones Rojos	1 – 0	Estudiantes de Altamira	Pirata Fuente, Veracruz
16:00	Carlos Ruiz 65'			Referee: Jorge Delgado

September 24, 2011 8	Dorados de Sinaloa	1 – 2	Tiburones Rojos	Estadio Carlos González, Culiacán, Sinaloa
19:00	Pablo Torres 80'		Omar Dominguez 37'; Daniel Guzman 51'	Referee: Felix Lopez

October 1, 2011 9	Tiburones Rojos	3 – 0	Mérida F.C.	Pirata Fuente, Veracruz
16:00	Carlos Ruiz 34', 62'; José Pineda 90+4'			Referee: Victor Bisguerra

October 8, 2011 10	Club León	3 – 0	Tiburones Rojos	Estadio Nou Camp, León
20:00	Nelson Maz 18'; Eder Cruz 24'; Julian Benitez 84'			Referee: Angel Monroy

October 15, 2011 11	Tiburones Rojos	1 – 1	Club Necaxa	Pirata Fuente, Veracruz
16:00	Carlos Ruiz 57'		Pierre Ibarra 80'	Referee: Leon Barajas

October 22, 2011 12	CF Indios	2 – 0	Tiburones Rojos

October 29, 2011 13	Tiburones Rojos	2 – 2	Toros Neza	Pirata Fuente, Veracruz
16:00

November 5, 2011 14	Lobos de la BUAP	0 – 2	Tiburones Rojos	Estadio Cuauhtémoc, Puebla

November 19, 2011 15	Tiburones Rojos	3 – 2	Leones Negros	Pirata Fuente, Veracruz
16:00

== Clausura Squad ==
As of January 7, 2012.

Note: Flags indicate national team as defined under FIFA eligibility rules; some limited exceptions apply. Players may hold more than one non-FIFA nationality.

No.	Pos.	Nation	Player
1	GK	MEX	José Rodríguez
2	DF	MEX	Omar Domínguez
4	DF	MEX	Miguel Hernández
6	DF	MEX	Juan Pablo Montaño
7	MF	MEX	Diego Armando Esqueda
8	MF	MEX	Víctor Manuel Santiago
9	FW	MEX	Daniel Guzmán Miranda
10	MF	MEX	Manuel Perez
11	FW	GUA	Pablo Gabriel Torres
12	GK	MEX	Jorge Bernal
13	MF	MEX	Josymar Moreno
14	DF	MEX	Geovanne Flores

No.	Pos.	Nation	Player
15	MF	MEX	Juan Alberto Ramírez
16	DF	MEX	Luis Eduardo Sánchez
17	DF	MEX	Néstor Olguín
18	FW	MEX	Samer Haj Omar
19	MF	MEX	Faustino Castillo
20	FW	GUA	Carlos Ruiz
21	MF	MEX	Jesús Olivares
22	DF	MEX	Luis Enriquez Robles
23	GK	MEX	Julio César Alarcón
24	FW	MEX	Edgar Bravo
25	MF	MEX	Jorge Armando Barrera
26	MF	MEX	Erik González
27	FW	MEX	Christian Javier Lopez
28	MF	MEX	Ajejandro Berber
29	MF	MEX	Migel Angel Zepeda
30	FW	MEX	Erik Samano
32	MF	MEX	Rafael Medina
33	FW	MEX	Uriel Alvarez
35	FW	MEX	José Luis Pineda

=== Match results ===
Win Tie Loss

=== Clausura 2012 ===
January 7, 20112 1	Tiburones Rojos	1 – 0	Pumas Morelos	Pirata Fuente, Veracruz
16:00	Carlos Ruiz 90'			Referee: Feliz Lopez

v

=== Leading Scorers ===
Rank	Scorer	Goals	Assists
1	(Guatemala) Carlos Ruiz	7	0
2	(Uruguay) Raúl Ferro	1	0
2	(Uruguay) Alejandro Acosta	1	0
2	(Mexico) Omar Dominguez	1	0
2	(Mexico) Daniel Guzman Miranda	1	0
2	(Mexico) Jose Pineda	1	0
