= Emmanuel Tapia =

Mexican footballer (born 1989)

Personal information
- Full name: Emmanuel Alejandro Tapia Estrada
- Date of birth: 22 January 1989 (age 37)
- Place of birth: Guadalajara, Jalisco, Mexico
- Height: 1.81 m (5 ft 11 in)
- Position: Forward

Youth career
- Atlas

Senior career*
| Years | Team | Apps | (Gls) |
| 2008–2009 | Zapotlanejo | 33 | (8) |
| 2010–2011 | Cachorros UdeG | 19 | (10) |
| 2011–2012 | Murciélagos | 24 | (12) |
| 2012 | Querétaro | 6 | (1) |
| 2013 | → Delfines (loan) | 13 | (8) |
| 2013 | → Altamira (loan) | 10 | (0) |
| 2014 | Unión de Curtidores | 11 | (8) |
| 2014–2015 | Irapuato | 15 | (1) |
| 2015–2016 | Murciélagos | 16 | (4) |
| 2017 | Suchitepéquez | 7 | (5) |
| 2018 | Deportivo Guastatoya | 7 | (1) |
| 2018–2019 | Suchitepéquez | 0 | (0) |
| 2020 | Furia Roja | 0 | (0) |
- * Club domestic league appearances and goals

Emmanuel Alejandro Tapia Estrada (Note: In this Spanish name, the first or paternal surname is Tapia and the second or maternal family name is Estrada.) (born 22 January 1989) is a former Mexican footballer who played as forward.

== Career ==
Emmanuel Tapia began in the Atlas youth academy. He spent time with many second and third division teams after his stint with Atlas.

In 2012, he arrived in with first division club Querétaro. He made his debut in a Copa MX match in which he scored a hat-trick against Veracruz. Tapia was later sent out on loan.

In the summer 2018, Tapia re-joined Suchitepéquez. On 20 March 2019 he announced on Facebook, that he had decided to leave the club for personal reasons.
