= Jorge Valencia =

Mexican footballer (born 1991)

Personal information
- Full name: Jorge Luis Valencia Arredondo
- Date of birth: 6 April 1991 (age 35)
- Place of birth: Querétaro, Mexico
- Height: 1.89 m (6 ft 2 1/2 in)
- Position: Defender

Senior career*
Years	Team	Apps	(Gls)
2009–2012	Tigres UANL	0	(0)
2012–2014	Querétaro	1	(0)
2013	→ Irapuato (loan)	8	(0)

International career
2011	Mexico U20	4	(0)

Managerial career
- 2017: Limoneros de Apatzingán (Assistant)
Medal record
Representing Mexico
Winner	CONCACAF U-20 Championship	2011
Third place	FIFA U-20 World Cup	2011
- * Club domestic league appearances and goals as of 2 September 2012

Jorge Luis Valencia Arredondo (Note: In this Spanish name, the first or paternal surname is Valencia and the second or maternal family name is Arredondo.) (born 6 April 1991) is a Mexican former professional footballer who played as a defender.

== Honours ==
Mexico U20

- CONCACAF U-20 Championship: 2011
- FIFA U-20 World Cup 3rd Place: 2011
