= Mitchel Oviedo =

Mexican footballer (born 1988)

Personal information
- Full name: Mitchel Oviedo Hernández
- Date of birth: 7 July 1988 (age 38)
- Place of birth: Veracruz, Veracruz, Mexico
- Height: 1.69 m (5 ft 6 1/2 in)
- Position: Midfielder

Youth career
- 2007–2010: Guadalajara

Senior career*
Years	Team	Apps	(Gls)
2007–2011	Guadalajara	1	(0)
2007–2009	→ Tapatío (loan)	34	(0)
2009–2010	→ Pumas Morelos (loan)	30	(0)
2011–2013	Querétaro	30	(2)
2013–2014	→ Delfines (loan)	3	(0)
2015	Veracruz	0	(0)
2015–2018	Celaya	58	(2)
2020	Morelos	0	(0)

International career
2005	Mexico U17	1	(0)
- * Club domestic league appearances and goals

Mitchel Oviedo Hernández (born 7 July 1988) is a Mexican former footballer who played as a midfielder.

== Career ==
Oviedo came from the youth squads of Guadalajara. He only managed to play one official match with the club and he was featured mainly in the reserve squads. After many loan stints, he officially signed with Veracruz in January 2015.
