= Omar Vásquez =

Colombian footballer (born 1989)

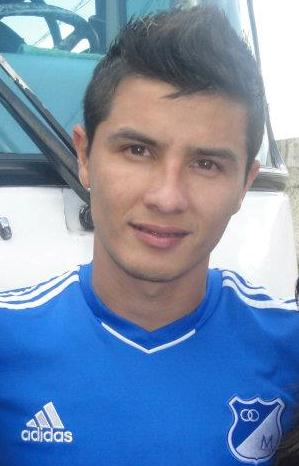

Personal information
- Full name: Édson Omar Vásquez Ortega
- Date of birth: 15 August 1989 (age 37)
- Place of birth: El Zulia, Norte de Santander, Colombia
- Height: 1.67 m (5 ft 6 in)
- Position: Midfielder

Team information
- Current team: Alianza Universidad
- Number: 11

Youth career
- 2006–2007: Millonarios

Senior career*
Years	Team	Apps	(Gls)
2007–2015	Millonarios	162	(11)
2008	→ Girardot (loan)	1	(0)
2008–2012	→ Querétaro (loan)	6	(1)
2013	→ Delfines (loan)	16	(2)
2016	La Equidad	15	(1)
2017	Patriotas Boyacá	35	(1)
2018	Rionegro Águilas	27	(0)
2019	Royal Pari	34	(0)
2020–2021	Llaneros	33	(10)
2022	Unión Comercio	23	(5)
2023–	Alianza Universidad	69	(1)
- * Club domestic league appearances and goals as of 30 December 2025

Édson Omar Vásquez Ortega (born August 15, 1989) is a Colombian football midfield. He currently plays for Alianza Universidad.

== Career ==
Vásquez is a product of the Millonarios youth system and played with the Millonarios first team since November, 2007 .

== Career statistics ==
=== Club ===
- Source

Club	Division	Season	League		Cup		Continental		Total	
Club	Division	Season	Apps	Goals	Apps	Goals	Apps	Goals	Apps	Goals
Millonarios	Categoría Primera A	2007	1	0	—		0	0	1	0
Millonarios	Categoría Primera A	2008-II	1	0	0	0	—		1	0
Millonarios	Categoría Primera A	2009	18	2	8	0	—		26	2
Millonarios	Categoría Primera A	2010	25	3	13	0	—		38	3
Millonarios	Categoría Primera A	2011	16	1	1	0	—		17	1
Millonarios	Categoría Primera A	2012	35	1	4	0	10	1	49	2
Millonarios	Categoría Primera A	2014	27	2	5	0	0	0	32	2
Millonarios	Categoría Primera A	2015	18	1	5	0	—		23	1
Millonarios	Total		141	10	36	0	10	1	187	11
Girardot	Categoría Primera B	2008-I	1	0	3	0	—		4	0
Querétaro	Liga MX	2013-I	6	1	3	0	—		9	1
Delfines	Ascenso MX	2013-II	16	2	2	0	—		18	2
La Equidad	Categoría Primera A	2016	15	1	7	0	—		22	1
Patriotas Boyacá	Categoría Primera A	2017	35	0	6	1	4	0	45	1
Rionegro Águilas	Categoría Primera A	2018	27	0	2	0	—		29	0
Royal Pari	Primera División	2019	34	0	—		5	0	39	0
Llaneros	Categoría Primera B	2020	15	9	—		—		15	9
Llaneros	Categoría Primera B	2021	18	1	4	1	—		22	2
Llaneros	Total		33	10	4	1	0	0	37	11
Unión Comercio	Liga 2	2022	23	4	—		—		23	4
Alianza Universidad	Liga 2	2023	21	0	—		—		21	0
Career total			308	24	63	2	19	1	390	27

== Personal life ==
His brother Larry Vásquez is also a footballer.

== Honours ==
Millonarios

- Copa Colombia (1) : 2011
- Categoría Primera A (1) : 2012
