= Jonathan de León =

Mexican footballer (born 1987)

Personal information
- Full name: Jonathan Horacio de León Ochoa
- Date of birth: June 22, 1987 (age 39)
- Place of birth: Guadalupe, Nuevo León, Mexico
- Height: 1.81 m (5 ft 11 in)
- Position: Midfielder

Team information
- Current team: Municipal Liberia

Youth career
- Tigres

Senior career*
| Years | Team | Apps | (Gls) |
| 2007–2011 | Tigres | 27 | (0) |
| 2011 | → Los Angeles Blues (loan) | 6 | (2) |
| 2012–2013 | Querétaro | 2 | (0) |
| 2015– | Municipal Liberia | 26 | (3) |
- * Club domestic league appearances and goals as of 13 August 2016

Jonathan Horacio de León Ochoa (born June 22, 1987) is a Mexican footballer who plays for Municipal Liberia.
