= Rubén García (footballer, born 1982) =

Mexican footballer

Personal information
- Full name: Rubén Fernando García González
- Date of birth: 20 August 1982 (age 44)
- Place of birth: Pachuca, Hidalgo, Mexico
- Height: 1.78 m (5 ft 10 in)
- Position: Goalkeeper

Senior career*
Years	Team	Apps	(Gls)
2001–2005	Pachuca	1	(0)
2005–2006	Lobos BUAP	2	(0)
2009–2010	→ La Piedad (loan)	4	(0)
2011	Veracruz	2	(0)
2011–2013	La Piedad	16	(0)
2013–2014	Veracruz	0	(0)
- * Club domestic league appearances and goals as of 17 June 2013

Rubén Fernando García González (Note: In this Spanish name, the first or paternal surname is García and the second or maternal family name is González.) (born 20 August 1982) is a former Mexican footballer, who last played as a goalkeeper for Tiburones Rojos de Veracruz in Liga MX.

== Club career ==
García made his professional debut on 6 October 2001 at age 19 for Pachuca in a game against Toluca. He replaced his colleague, second-string goalkeeper Jesus Salvador Alfaro, who had been red-carded in a 3–3 tie. He played the last 4 minutes of the game, was scored on by Víctor Ruiz and Toluca won the game, 4–3.

He was inactive for a period, until he reappeared with Lobos BUAP in 2005, playing in two games and allowing just two goals.

He later signed on with La Piedad.
