= Alfonso Rippa =

Mexican footballer (born 1986)

Personal information
- Full name: Alfonso José Rippa Castro
- Date of birth: June 23, 1986 (age 40)
- Place of birth: Mexico City, Mexico
- Height: 6 ft 2 in (1.88 m)
- Position: Centre back

Senior career*
Years	Team	Apps	(Gls)
2007–2008	América B	9	(0)
2008–2009	BK Häcken	3	(0)
2009–2010	Dorados Mochis	29	(2)
2010–2011	Deportivo Guamúchil	7	(1)
2011–2012	Club Celaya	5	(0)
2012–2013	Querétaro	13	(0)
2013–2014	Atlético San Luis	17	(2)
2014–2015	Irapuato F.C.	26	(3)
2015–2016	Murcielagos F.C.	22	(1)
2016–2018	Potros UAEM	52	(2)
2018	Club Atlético Zacatepec	2	(0)

Managerial career
- 2022–2026: Atlante (Assistant)
- * Club domestic league appearances and goals

Alfonso José Rippa Castro is a former Mexican defensive footballer. He last played for Club Atlético Zacatepec of the Ascenso MX. His debut was with Club América second division team. In January 2008, he signed with BK Häcken of the Sweden league.
