= Efraín Cortés =

Colombian footballer (born 1984)

Efraín Cortes
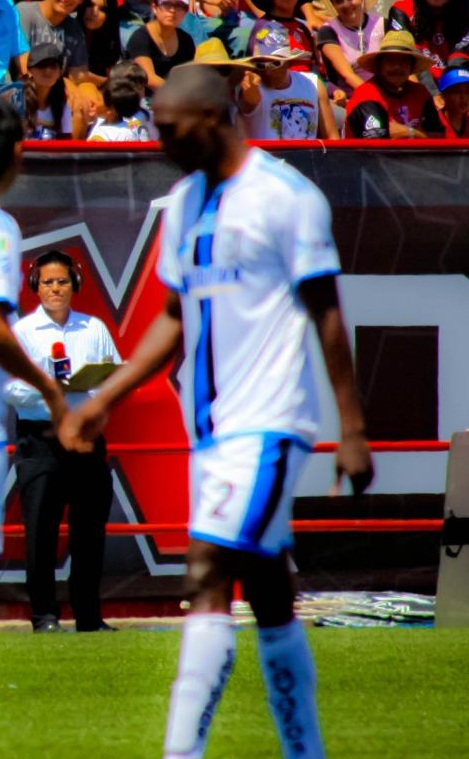
- Cortés while playing for Querétaro

Personal information
- Full name: Efraín Cortes Gruesso
- Date of birth: July 10, 1984 (age 42)
- Place of birth: Florida, Valle, Colombia
- Height: 1.83 m (6 ft 0 in)
- Position: Centre back

Senior career*
Years	Team	Apps	(Gls)
2004–2006	Deportes Quindío	72	(1)
2007–2009	Millonarios	75	(2)
2010–2011	Deportivo Cali	26	(0)
2011–2012	Querétaro	50	(2)
2013	Nacional	11	(0)
2013–2015	Pachuca	24	(0)
2014−2015	→ Puebla (loan)	10	(0)
2016	Atlético Huila	9	(0)
2016–2017	América de Cali	36	(2)
2018	Patriotas Boyacá	2	(0)
2019	Deportes Quindío	13	(0)
2020	Boyacá Chicó	1	(0)
- * Club domestic league appearances and goals as of 12:50, 5 August 2021 (UTC)

Efraín Cortés Gruesso (Note: In this Spanish name, the first or paternal surname is Cortés and the second or maternal family name is Gruesso.) (born July 10, 1984), known as Efraín Cortés, is a Colombian football centre back.
