= Saúl Villalobos =

Mexican footballer (born 1991)

Personal information
- Full name: Saul Villalobos Gutiérrez
- Date of birth: June 26, 1991 (age 35)
- Place of birth: Jalostotitlán, Jalisco, Mexico
- Height: 1.85 m (6 ft 1 in)
- Position: Midfielder

Youth career
- 2006–2009: Academicos

Senior career*
Years	Team	Apps	(Gls)
2009–2013	Atlas	12	(0)
2012–2013	→ León (loan)	0	(0)
2013	→ Estudiantes Tecos (loan)	7	(0)
2014–2015	Puebla	9	(1)
2015–2016	→ Tlaxcala (loan)	6	(9)
2016	→ Venados (loan)	13	(1)
2017–2018	Salamanca	7	(0)
2020	Jaguares de Jalisco	0	(0)

International career
2011	Mexico U20	9	(0)
Medal record
Representing Mexico
Winner	CONCACAF U-20 Championship	2011
Third place	FIFA U-20 World Cup	2011
- * Club domestic league appearances and goals

Saúl Villalobos Gutiérrez (born 26 June 1991) is a Mexican former footballer who played sparingly as a midfielder with teams in Liga MX and Ascenso MX, the top two tiers of the Mexican football league system.

== Career ==
Villalobos began his playing career in the Atlas youth teams in 2006. He managed to break into the first team on 4 November 2009, during a 1–0 loss to Puebla.

Villalobos played for the Mexico U-20 team at the 2011 FIFA U-20 World Cup finals in Colombia.

== Honours ==
Mexico U20

- CONCACAF U-20 Championship: 2011
- FIFA U-20 World Cup 3rd Place: 2011
