= Apodi (footballer) =

Brazilian footballer (born 1986)

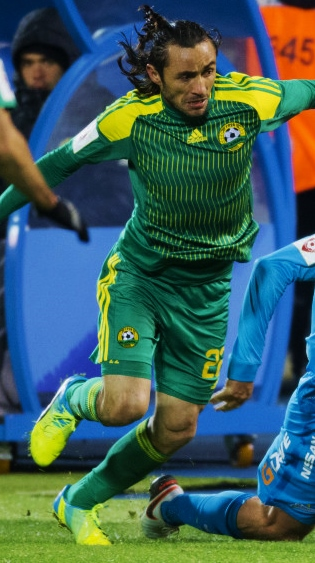
- Apodi with Kuban Krasnodar in 2016

Personal information
- Full name: Luiz Diallisson de Souza Alves
- Date of birth: 13 December 1986 (age 39)
- Place of birth: Apodi, Rio Grande do Norte, Brazil
- Height: 1.71 m (5 ft 7 in)
- Position: Right-back

Team information
- Current team: Brasiliense

Youth career
- 2003: São Gonçalo-RS
- 2004: Internacional
- 2005: Real Salvador

Senior career*
Years	Team	Apps	(Gls)
2005–2007	Vitória	148	(3)
2008–2012	Cruzeiro	8	(1)
2008	→ Santos (loan)	12	(1)
2008	→ São Caetano (loan)	8	(0)
2009	→ Vitória (loan)	54	(7)
2010	→ Bahia (loan)	16	(0)
2010	→ Guarani (loan)	20	(0)
2011	→ Tokyo Verdy (loan)	15	(0)
2012	→ Ceará (loan)	50	(2)
2013–2014	Querétaro	30	(1)
2014	→ Delfines (loan)	14	(2)
2014	Bastia	0	(0)
2015	Chapecoense	53	(4)
2016	Kuban Krasnodar	15	(1)
2016	→ Sport Recife (loan)	15	(0)
2017–2018	Chapecoense	85	(1)
2018–2019	Ohod	14	(0)
2019	CSA	42	(5)
2020–2021	Ponte Preta	66	(7)
2021–2023	Goiás	97	(13)
2024	Vila Nova	35	(2)
2025–	Brasiliense	2	(0)
- * Club domestic league appearances and goals as of 30 November 2023

Luís Dialisson de Souza Alves (born 13 December 1986), commonly known as Apodi, is a Brazilian footballer who plays as a right-back for Brasiliense. Initially gaining popularity at Vitória, he has embarked on a journeyman career so far with brief spells in Japan, Mexico, Russia and Saudi Arabia.

== Honours ==
Vitória

- Campeonato Baiano: 2007, 2009

Cruzeiro

- Campeonato Mineiro: 2008

Ceará

- Campeonato Cearense: 2012

Chapecoense

- Campeonato Catarinense: 2017

Goiás

- Copa Verde: 2023
