= Omar Marrufo =

Mexican footballer (born 1993)

Omar Marrufo Rodríguez (born July 2, 1993, in Cozumel, Quintana Roo) is a Mexican professional footballer who plays as a forward for Veracruz.
