= Juan Enríquez (footballer) =

Mexican footballer (born 1990)

Personal information
- Full name: Juan Carlos Enriquez Ávalos
- Date of birth: 18 September 1990 (age 36)
- Place of birth: Zacatecas, Zacatecas, Mexico
- Height: 1.77 m (5 ft 10 in)
- Position: Forward

Senior career*
Years	Team	Apps	(Gls)
2011–2012	Santos Laguna	4	(1)
2012	Querétaro	2	(0)
2013	FAS	5	(2)
2013	Ballenas Galeana	2	(0)
2014	Tuzos UAZ		
2015–2016	Mineros de Zacatecas	10	(1)
2017	Loros UdeC	2	(0)
2017	Mineros de Zacatecas	0	(0)
- * Club domestic league appearances and goals

Juan Carlos Enriquez Ávalos (Note: In this Spanish name, the first or paternal surname is Enriquez and the second or maternal family name is Ávalos.) (born 18 September 1990) is a Mexican footballer.

== Club career ==
He made his senior team debut on March 19, 2011, as a substitute in a match against Monarcas Morelia in a 0 - 1 loss of Santos.

He scored his first goal against Chiapas on a 3 - 2 loss.

He played as a forward for Ballenas Galeana of Mexico.
