= Néstor Olguín =

Mexican footballer (born 1988)

Personal information
- Full name: Néstor Yair Olguín Leyva
- Date of birth: 29 May 1988 (age 38)
- Place of birth: Xalapa, Veracruz, Mexico
- Height: 1.69 m (5 ft 7 in)
- Position: Defender

Senior career*
Years	Team	Apps	(Gls)
2007–2008	Pioneros de Cancún	19	(0)
2009–2011	Orizaba	33	(1)
2011–2013	Veracruz	40	(1)
2013–2014	Atlético San Luis	25	(4)
2014–2015	Necaxa	22	(0)
2015–2016	→ Zacatepec (loan)	25	(1)
2016–2017	→ UAT (loan)	23	(2)
2019–2020	Cafetaleros	26	(2)
2020	Atlético Veracruz	0	(0)
- * Club domestic league appearances and goals as of 6:58 UTC, 19 October 2019

Néstor Olguín (born May 29, 1988) is a former professional Mexican footballer who last played for Atlético Veracruz.

He played with Atlético Veracruz of the Liga de Balompié Mexicano during the league's inaugural season, leading them to a runners-up finish after losing to Chapulineros de Oaxaca in the finals.
