= Alejandro Berber =

Mexican footballer (born 1987)

Personal information
- Full name: Alejandro Berber Castañón
- Date of birth: 3 August 1987 (age 39)
- Place of birth: Monterrey, Nuevo Leon, Mexico
- Height: 1.68 m (5 ft 6 in)
- Position: Midfielder

Senior career*
Years	Team	Apps	(Gls)
2008–2009	C.F. Monterrey Premier	18	(0)
2008–2009	Monterrey	3	(0)
2009–2010	→ Guerreros de Hermosillo (loan)	15	(1)
2010–2011	Leones Negros UdeG	15	(1)
2011–2013	Veracruz	20	(2)
2012–2015	Correcaminos UAT	80	(2)
2015–2016	Veracruz	3	(0)
2016–2017	Zacatepec	37	(2)
2017–2018	FC Juárez	28	(1)
2018	Venados F.C.	14	(0)
2019–2020	Oaxaca	4	(0)
- * Club domestic league appearances and goals

Alejandro Berber Castañón (born August 3, 1987) is a former professional Mexican footballer.
