= 2011 CONCACAF U-20 Championship =

Premundial CONCACAF Sub-20 2011 (in Spanish)
- 2011 CONCACAF U-20 Championship logo

Tournament details
- Host country: Guatemala
- Dates: 28 March – 10 April
- Teams: 12 (from 1 confederation)
- Venues: 2 (in 1 host city)

Final positions
- Champions: Mexico (11th title)
- Runners-up: Costa Rica
- Third place: Guatemala
- Fourth place: Panama

Tournament statistics
- Matches played: 20
- Goals scored: 62 (3.1 per match)
- Attendance: 85,290 (4,265 per match)
- Top scorer: (Costa Rica) Joel Campbell (6 goals)

The 2011 CONCACAF Under-20 Championship was expanded to 12 teams beginning in 2011. The tournament determined the four CONCACAF teams that participated at the 2011 FIFA U-20 World Cup to be held in Colombia. In addition, the top three finishers from Central America or the Caribbean, in addition to hosts Mexico, qualified to participate at the 2011 Pan American Games. The Executive Committee approved that for men's U-20 championships all three North American teams again qualified automatically for the finals. Central America received four berths, and the Caribbean received five.

The new allocations give Central America one more berth than it had in 2009 and the Caribbean three more. On 1 September 2010 CONCACAF announced Guatemala as host of the championship, played from 3–17 April.

The championship was scheduled to be held a week later but was moved ahead one week due to a scheduling conflict.

== Qualified teams ==
Region	Qualification Tournament	Qualifiers
Caribbean (CFU)	Caribbean U-20 qualifying tournament	Jamaica; Guadeloupe; Cuba; Trinidad and Tobago; Suriname
Central America (UNCAF)	Central American U-20 qualifying tournament	Guatemala (hosts); Panama; Honduras; Costa Rica
North America (NAFU)	Automatically qualified	Canada; Mexico; United States

== Venues ==
The tournament was hosted in two stadium.

2011 CONCACAF U-20 Championship is located in Guatemala	Guatemala City	
2011 CONCACAF U-20 Championship is located in Guatemala	Estadio Mateo Flores	Estadio Cementos Progreso
2011 CONCACAF U-20 Championship is located in Guatemala	Capacity: 30,000	Capacity: 16,000

== Draw ==
The draw for the final tournament took place on February 11 in Guatemala City, Guatemala, dividing the 12 sides into four, three-team groups.

Pot 1	Pot 2	Pot 3
Guatemala (Host); Canada; United States; Mexico	Costa Rica; Honduras; Panama; Trinidad and Tobago	Cuba; Guadeloupe; Jamaica; Suriname

== Status of Guadeloupe ==
Guadeloupe is a member of CONCACAF but not a member of FIFA. As such, they are eligible to compete for CONCACAF Championships but are not eligible to qualify for the FIFA U-20 World Cup. If they had reached the semifinals of this tournament, the 4th team from CONCACAF to qualify for the 2011 FIFA U-20 World Cup would have been the losing quarterfinalist who gained the most points in the group stage. If two or more teams had been tied, then a drawing of lots would have been be used.

== Group stage ==
Key to colours in group tables
Top 2 teams in each group advanced to the quarterfinals

=== Group A ===
Team	Pld	W	D	L	GF	GA	GD	Pts
Honduras	2	2	0	0	5	2	+3	6
Guatemala	2	1	0	1	3	3	0	3
Jamaica	2	0	0	2	1	4	−3	0

29 March 2011
22:00 UTC-5

Guatemala	2 – 0	Jamaica
Hyde 8' (o.g.); Lima 35'	Report

Estadio Mateo Flores, Guatemala City
Attendance: 3,917
Referee: Marlon Mejia (El Salvador)

31 March 2011
22:00 UTC-5

Honduras	2 – 1	Jamaica
Alvarado 61'; López 77'	Report	Brett 25'

Estadio Mateo Flores, Guatemala City
Attendance: 417
Referee: Jeffrey Solis (Costa Rica)

2 April 2011
20:00 UTC-5

Guatemala	1 – 3	Honduras
Lima 38'	Report	A. Lozano 3'; Martinez 25'; López 54'

Estadio Mateo Flores, Guatemala City
Attendance: 12,142
Referee: Roberto Orozco (Mexico)

=== Group B ===
Team	Pld	W	D	L	GF	GA	GD	Pts
United States	2	2	0	0	6	0	+6	6
Panama	2	1	0	1	3	2	+1	3
Suriname	2	0	0	2	0	7	−7	0

29 March 2011
20:00 UTC-5

Suriname	0 – 4	United States
	Report	Wood 19'; Gyau 29'; Doyle 36'; Rowe 81'

Estadio Mateo Flores, Guatemala City
Attendance: 3,746
Referee: Dave Gantar (Canada)

31 March 2011
20:00 UTC-5

Panama	3 – 0	Suriname
Waterman 36', 60', 68'	Report

Estadio Mateo Flores, Guatemala City
Attendance: 315
Referee: Roberto Orozco (Mexico)

2 April 2011
18:00 UTC-5

United States	2 – 0	Panama
Rowe 13', 18'	Report

Estadio Mateo Flores, Guatemala City
Attendance: 8,500
Referee: Marcos Brea (Cuba)

=== Group C ===
Team	Pld	W	D	L	GF	GA	GD	Pts
Costa Rica	2	2	0	0	6	0	+6	6
Canada	2	1	0	1	2	4	−2	3
Guadeloupe	2	0	0	2	1	5	−4	0

28 March 2011
20:00 UTC-5

Canada	2 – 1	Guadeloupe
Cavallini 52'; Bassi 58'	Report	Houelche 25'

Estadio Cementos Progreso, Guatemala City
Attendance: 150
Referee: José Molina (Honduras)

30 March 2011
20:00 UTC-5

Guadeloupe	0 – 3	Costa Rica
	Report	Campbell 57', 62'; D. Vega 74'

Estadio Cementos Progreso, Guatemala City
Attendance: 770
Referee: Oscar Reyna (Guatemala)

1 April 2011
20:00 UTC-5

Costa Rica	3 – 0	Canada
Golobio 34'; Campbell 66'; Miller 90+1'	Report

Estadio Cementos Progreso, Guatemala City
Attendance: 1,445
Referee: Raymond Bogle (Jamaica)

=== Group D ===
Team	Pld	W	D	L	GF	GA	GD	Pts
Mexico	2	2	0	0	8	0	+8	6
Cuba	2	0	1	1	0	3	−3	1
Trinidad and Tobago	2	0	1	1	0	5	−5	1

28 March 2011
22:00 UTC-5

Cuba	0 – 3	Mexico
	Report	Malblanche 36' (o.g.); Pulido 53'; Dávila 85'

Estadio Cementos Progreso, Guatemala City
Attendance: 269
Referee: Mark Geiger (United States)

30 March 2011
22:00 UTC-5

Trinidad and Tobago	0 – 0	Cuba
	Report

Estadio Cementos Progreso, Guatemala City
Attendance: 1,500
Referee: Trevor Taylor (Barbados)

1 April 2011
22:00 UTC-5

Mexico	5 – 0	Trinidad and Tobago
Guarch 7', 25', 49'; Pulido 31', 41'	Report

Estadio Cementos Progreso, Guatemala City
Attendance: 1,586
Referee: José Molina (Honduras)

== Knockout stage ==
Quarter-finals
5 April—Guatemala City
Mexico	3
Canada	0
6 April—Guatemala City
Honduras	0
Panama	2
5 April — Guatemala City
Costa Rica	6
Cuba	1
6 April — Guatemala City
United States	1
Guatemala	2

Semi-finals
8 April — Guatemala City
Mexico	4
Panama	1
8 April — Guatemala City
Costa Rica	2
Guatemala	1

Final
10 April — Guatemala City
Mexico	3
Costa Rica	1
Third place
10 April — Guatemala City
Panama	0(6)
Guatemala (pen.)	0(7)

=== Quarterfinals ===
5 April 2011
19:00 UTC-5

Costa Rica	6 – 1	Cuba
Campbell 29' (pen.), 58', 87'; Miller 32' (pen.); B. Vega 51'; Diaz 75'	Report	Lahera 3'

Estadio Mateo Flores, Guatemala City
Attendance: 179
Referee: Trevor Taylor (Barbados)

5 April 2011
22:00 UTC-5

Mexico	3 – 0	Canada
Álvarez 33'; De Buen 72'; Mora 90+2'	Report

Estadio Mateo Flores, Guatemala City
Attendance: 475
Referee: Mark Geiger (United States)

6 April 2011
19:00 UTC-5

Honduras	0 – 2	Panama
	Report	Álvarez 51'; Waterman 85'

Estadio Mateo Flores, Guatemala City
Attendance: 5,300
Referee: Marlon Mejia (El Salvador)

6 April 2011
22:00 UTC-5

United States	1 – 2	Guatemala
Doyle 66'	Report	Lima 33'; Lopez 68'

Estadio Mateo Flores, Guatemala City
Attendance: 13,805
Referee: Roberto Orozco (Mexico)

=== Semifinals ===
8 April 2011
16:30 UTC-5

Mexico	4 – 1	Panama
Dávila 14'; Linton 31' (o.g.); Izazola 40'; Rivera 49'	Report	Caicedo 28'

Estadio Mateo Flores, Guatemala City
Attendance: 2,353
Referee: Marlon Mejia (El Salvador)

8 April 2011
19:30 UTC-5

Costa Rica	2 – 1	Guatemala
Miller 2'; B. Vega 48'	Report	Vásquez 62'

Estadio Mateo Flores, Guatemala City
Attendance: 18,689
Referee: Dave Gantar (Canada)

=== Third-place match ===
10 April 2011
14:00 UTC-5

Panama	0 – 0 (a.e.t.)	Guatemala
	Report
Penalties
Cummings (penalty scored); Álvarez (penalty scored); Botello (penalty scored); Waterman (penalty scored); Dixon (penalty scored); Chen (penalty scored); Jiménez (penalty missed)	6 – 7	(penalty scored) Ramirez; (penalty scored) Vásquez; (penalty scored) Rivas; (penalty scored) C. Lima; (penalty scored) Herrarte; (penalty scored) Andrade; (penalty scored) Lemus

Estadio Mateo Flores, Guatemala City
Attendance: 8,332
Referee: Roberto Orozco (Mexico)

=== Final ===
10 April 2011
17:00 UTC-5

Mexico	3 – 1	Costa Rica
Dávila 18', 52'; Orrantía 39'	Report	Mora 17'

Estadio Mateo Flores, Guatemala City
Attendance: 3,000
Referee: Mark Geiger (United States)

== Goalscorers ==
6 goals

- (Costa Rica) Joel Campbell

4 goals

- (Mexico) Ulises Dávila
- (Panama) Cecilio Waterman

3 goals

- (Costa Rica) Mynor Miller
- (Guatemala) Gerson Lima
- (Mexico) Taufic Guarch
- (Mexico) Alan Pulido
- (United States) Kelyn Rowe

2 goals

- (Costa Rica) Bryan Vega
- (Honduras) Alexander López
- (United States) Conor Doyle

1 goal

- (Canada) Derrick Bassi
- (Canada) Lucas Cavallini
- (Costa Rica) Joshua Diaz
- (Costa Rica) Juan Golobio
- (Costa Rica) Joseph Mora
- (Costa Rica) Deyver Vega
- (Cuba) Yaudel Lahera
- (Guadeloupe) Christophe Houelche
- (Guatemala) Henry Lopez
- (Guatemala) Elías Vásquez
- (Honduras) Ever Alvarado
- (Honduras) Anthony Lozano
- (Honduras) Nestor Martinez
- (Jamaica) Neco Brett
- (Mexico) Kristian Álvarez
- (Mexico) Diego de Buen
- (Mexico) David Izazola
- (Mexico) Jorge Mora
- (Mexico) Carlos Emilio Orrantía
- (Mexico) Edson Rivera
- (Panama) José Álvarez
- (Panama) Javier Caicedo
- (United States) Joseph Gyau
- (United States) Bobby Wood

Own goals

- (Cuba) Renay Malblanche for Mexico
- (Jamaica) Jhamie Hyde for Guatemala
- (Panama) Oscar Linton for Mexico

== Final ranking ==
Pos	Team	Pld	W	D	L	GF	GA	GD	Pts	Final result
1	Mexico	4	4	0	0	14	1	+13	12	Champions
2	Costa Rica	4	3	0	1	13	4	+9	9	Runners-up
3	Guatemala (H)	4	2	1	1	5	4	+1	7	Third place
4	Panama	4	2	1	1	5	2	+3	7	Fourth Place
5	United States	3	2	0	1	7	2	+5	6	Eliminated in Quarter-finals
6	Honduras	3	2	0	1	5	4	+1	6	Eliminated in Quarter-finals
7	Canada	3	1	0	2	2	7	−5	3	Eliminated in Quarter-finals
8	Cuba	3	0	1	2	1	9	−8	1	Eliminated in Quarter-finals
9	Trinidad and Tobago	2	0	1	1	0	5	−5	1	Eliminated in Group stage
10	Jamaica	2	0	0	2	1	4	−3	0	Eliminated in Group stage
11	Guadeloupe	2	0	0	2	1	5	−4	0	Eliminated in Group stage
12	Suriname	2	0	0	2	0	7	−7	0	Eliminated in Group stage

Source: rsssf.com
(H) Hosts

Note: Per statistical convention in football, matches decided in extra time are counted as wins and losses, while matches decided by penalty shoot-out are counted as draws.

== Countries to participate in 2011 FIFA U-20 World Cup ==
Top 4 teams qualified for the 2011 FIFA U-20 World Cup.

- Mexico
- Costa Rica
- Guatemala
- Panama

== Countries to participate in 2011 Pan American Games ==
4 teams qualified for the 2011 Pan American Games. The highest finisher from each the Caribbean and Central American regions will qualify, along with the best qualifying team from either region

- Mexico (host nation)
- Cuba (The highest finisher from Caribbean Region)
- Costa Rica (The highest finisher from Central American Region)
- Guatemala (best qualifying team from both Region)

° Note: Guatemala withdrew from the Pan American Games and was replaced by Trinidad and Tobago.

== See also ==
- 2011 FIFA U-20 World Cup
- CONCACAF
