= José Pineda (footballer) =

Mexican footballer (born 1990)

José Luis Pineda Sierra (born February 4, 1990, in Acapulco), known as José Pineda, is a Mexican professional association football (soccer) player who played for C.D. Tepatitlán de Morelos.
