= Fernando Santana =

Mexican footballer (born 1986)

Personal information
- Full name: Fernando Massiel Santana Santillán
- Date of birth: 17 May 1986 (age 40)
- Place of birth: Temascalapa, Estado de México, Mexico
- Height: 1.71 m (5 ft 7 1/2 in)
- Position: Midfielder

Senior career*
Years	Team	Apps	(Gls)
2007–2008	Pumas Naucalpan	8	(1)
2007–2014	UNAM	2	(0)
2007	Pumas Morelos	57	(1)
2011–2012	→ Tijuana (loan)	10	(0)
2012–2013	→ La Piedad (loan)	12	(2)
2013	→ Veracruz (loan)	4	(0)
2014	→ Zacatepec (loan)		
- * Club domestic league appearances and goals as of 30 July 2013

Fernando Massiel Santana Santillán (Note: In this Spanish name, the first or paternal surname is Santana and the second or maternal family name is Santillán.) (born 17 May 1986) is a former Mexican football player. Born in Temascalapa, he was a midfielder for Zacatepec.

== International Tournaments ==
Massiel Santana played 26 minutes in the 2008 InterLiga for Pumas UNAM, receiving a yellow card against Cruz Azul. Later that year, he would go on to play three matches (vs. C.D. Luis Ángel Firpo, Houston Dynamo, and scoring a goal against San Francisco F.C.) during the 2008–09 CONCACAF Champions League.

Fernando returned to the 2009–10 CONCACAF Champions League to play in six matches (vs. C.S.D. Comunicaciones, W Connection, Real C.D. España, and C.D. Marathón) for Pumas UNAM.
