= Luis Nieves =

Mexican footballer (born 1985)

Luis Humberto Nieves Mancillas (born 6 June 1985 in Tepic, Nayarit) is a former Mexican professional footballer who last played for UAT.
