= David Stringel =

Mexican footballer (born 1986)

David Stringel Vallejo (born March 26, 1986) is a former Mexican professional footballer who last played for Potros UAEM.
