= Félix Borja =

Ecuadorian footballer (born 1983)

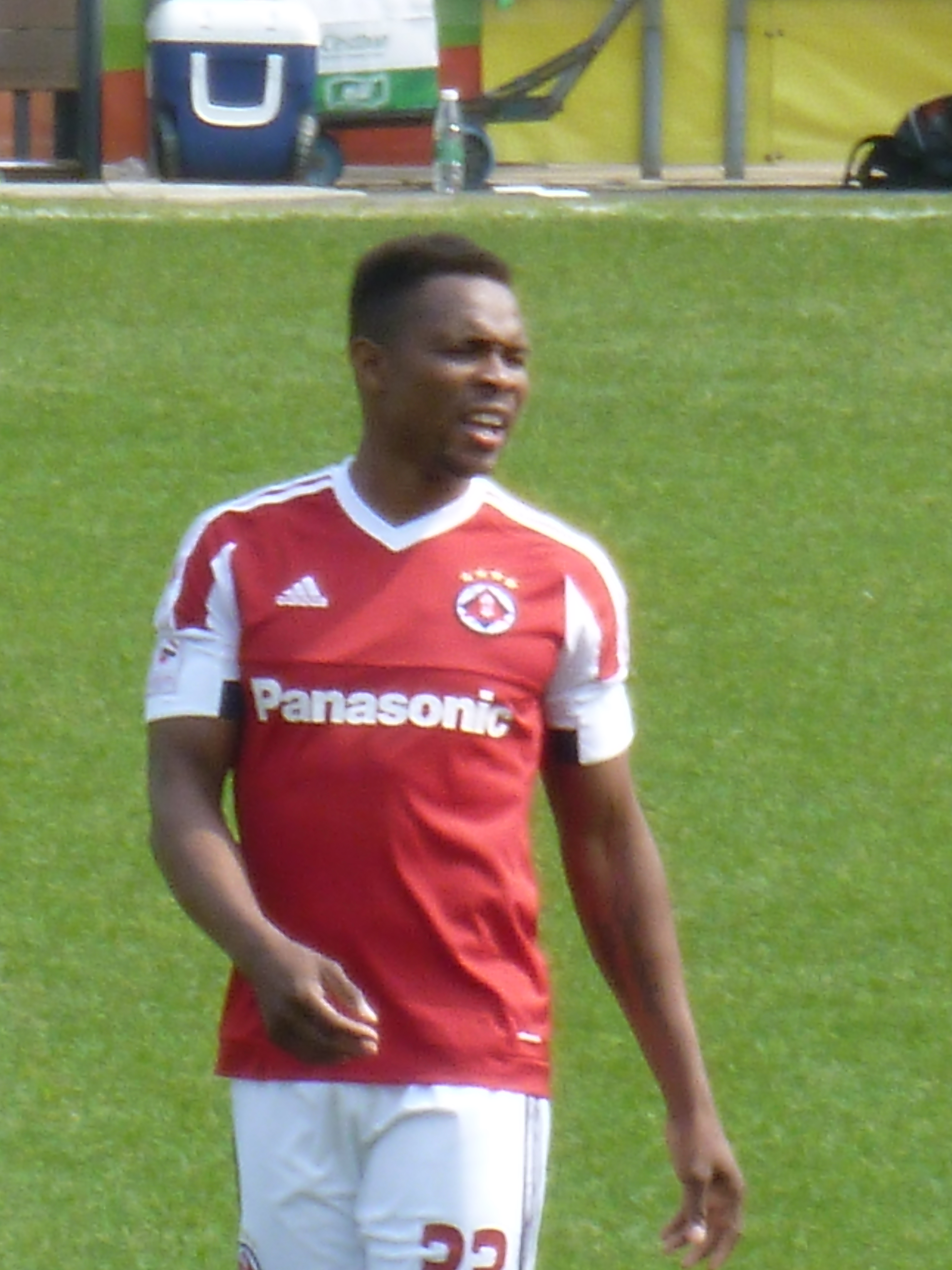
- Borja with South China in 2016

Personal information
- Full name: Félix Alexander Borja Valencia
- Date of birth: 2 April 1983 (age 43)
- Place of birth: San Lorenzo, Ecuador
- Height: 1.79 m (5 ft 10 in)
- Position: Forward

Senior career*
Years	Team	Apps	(Gls)
2001–2006	El Nacional	129	(50)
2006–2008	Olympiacos	23	(5)
2007–2008	→ Mainz 05 (loan)	32	(16)
2008–2010	Mainz 05	20	(6)
2010–2011	Puebla	15	(6)
2011–2015	Pachuca	42	(10)
2013	→ Puebla (loan)	25	(7)
2014	→ LDU Quito (loan)	16	(2)
2014	→ Chivas USA (loan)	12	(3)
2015	Mushuc Runa	11	(1)
2015	Real Garcilaso	14	(1)
2016	South China	5	(0)
2017	El Nacional	13	(1)

International career
2005–2011	Ecuador	22	(3)

Managerial career
- 2022–2024: El Nacional (assistant)
- 2025: Aucas (assistant)
- 2026: Tepatitlán (assistant)
- * Club domestic league appearances and goals

Félix Alexander Borja Valencia (born 2 April 1983) is an Ecuadorian football coach and former player who played as a forward. He is the current assistant manager of Aucas.

Borja is nicknamed the "kangaroo", or "the cobra of Ecuador", for the spring in his jump. His height makes it easy to score goals for his club and country.

== Club career ==
=== El Nacional ===
Felix Borja previously played for El Nacional of Ecuador.

=== Olympiacos ===
His transfer to Greek league champions Olympiacos made him the first Ecuadorian player to play for a Greek team. Borja was declared Copa Libertadores de América's joint top goalscorer two months after his transfer to Olympiacos.

=== Mainz 05 ===
Due to his sub-standard performances for Olympiacos in his first season, as well as the fact that he occupies a non-EU player spot at his current team's roster, Olympiacos had the desire at the end of the 2006–07 season to sell him or loan him for the upcoming season. Due to that decision by the club, Borja was loaned out to German club Mainz 05 for the 2007–08 season. At the end of the season, Mainz signed him permanently. During the winter transfer window of the 2010–11 season, Borja was allowed to leave on a free transfer ahead of an expected move to Mexican club Puebla F.C.

=== Puebla ===
Having limited success, especially after Mainz earned promotion to the Bundesliga, he transferred to the Mexican club Puebla.

=== Pachuca ===
In the 2011–12 Apertaura season, he was transferred to Pachuca F.C.

==== Loan to Chivas USA ====
On 14 August 2014, Borja joined Major League Soccer team Chivas USA on loan from LDU Quito. He would score the lone goal in a 1–0 victory over the San Jose Earthquakes in the final game of the regular season. This would end up being the final goal in club history, as Chivas USA folded the next day.

=== South China ===
On 28 December 2015, Hong Kong giants South China announced the capture of the player via Facebook.

=== Return to El Nacional ===
On 24 January 2017, Borja signed a contract with El Nacional. Previously he was a free agent.

== International career ==
Borja was included in the Ecuador for the 2006 FIFA World Cup. He played in several of the 2006 FIFA World Cup qualifying matches for the Ecuador national team, including the game against Uruguay which confirmed their passage to the 2006 FIFA World Cup. He made one appearance at the tournament against Germany, where they were defeated 3–0.

He featured in friendlies after the FIFA World Cup, even scoring against Brazil in an October 2006 friendly in Sweden. He was called up to Ecuador for the 2007 Copa América, and started in the final group game against Brazil.

== Career statistics ==
=== Club ===
As of 26 April 2016

Appearances and goals by club, season and competition
Club	Season	League			Cup		Continental		Total	
Club	Season	Division	Apps	Goals	Apps	Goals	Apps	Goals	Apps	Goals
El Nacional	2001	Ecuadorian Serie A	9	4	–		1	0	10	4
El Nacional	2002	Ecuadorian Serie A	21	4	–		0	0	21	4
El Nacional	2003	Ecuadorian Serie A	11	6	–		0	0	11	6
El Nacional	2004	Ecuadorian Serie A	29	3	–		4	4	33	7
El Nacional	2005	Ecuadorian Serie A	49	26	–		2	0	51	26
El Nacional	2006	Ecuadorian Serie A	10	7	–		6	5	16	12
El Nacional	Total		129	50	–		13	9	142	59
Olympiacos	2006–07	Super League Greece	23	5	0	0	4	0	27	5
Mainz 05 (loan)	2007–08	2. Bundesliga	32	16	1	1	0	0	33	17
Mainz 05	2008–09	2. Bundesliga	19	6	2	0	0	0	21	6
Mainz 05	2009–10	Bundesliga	1	0	0	0	0	0	1	0
Mainz 05	Total		20	6	2	0	0	0	22	6
Puebla	2011 Clausura	Liga MX	15	6	0	0	0	0	15	6
Pachuca	2011–12	Liga MX	30	5	0	0	0	0	30	5
Pachuca	2012 Apertura	Liga MX	12	5	1	1	0	0	13	6
Pachuca	Total		42	10	1	1	0	0	43	11
Puebla (loan)	2013 Clausura	Liga MX	14	7	2	1	0	0	16	8
Puebla (loan)	2013 Apertura	Liga MX	11	0	0	0	0	0	11	0
Puebla (loan)	Total		25	7	2	1	0	0	27	8
LDU Quito (loan)	2014	Ecuadorian Serie A	16	2	–		0	0	16	2
Chivas USA (loan)	2014	MLS	12	3	0	0	0	0	12	3
Mushuc Runa	2015	Ecuadorian Serie A	11	1	–		0	0	11	1
Real Garcilaso	2015	Peruvian Primera División	14	1	–		0	0	14	1
South China	2015–16	Hong Kong Premier League	5	0	6	3	0	0	11	3
Career total			344	107	12	6	17	9	373	122

=== International ===
Scores and results list Ecuador's goal tally first.

No	Date	Venue	Opponent	Score	Result	Competition
1.	18 August 2005	Estadio Federativo Reina del Cisne, Loja, Ecuador	Venezuela	1–0	3–1	Friendly
2.	27 December 2005	Cairo International Stadium, Cairo, Egypt	Senegal	1–1	1–2	2005 LG Cup
3.	10 October 2006	Råsunda Stadium, Stockholm, Sweden	Brazil	1–0	1–2	Friendly

== Honours ==
El Nacional

- Serie A de Ecuador: 2005 C, 2006

Olympiacos

- Super League Greece: 2006–07
