= David Izazola =

Mexican footballer (born 1991)

Personal information
- Full name: David Izazola Ramírez
- Date of birth: 23 October 1991 (age 35)
- Place of birth: Mexico City, Mexico
- Height: 1.78 m (5 ft 10 in)
- Position: Forward

Youth career
- UNAM

Senior career*
Years	Team	Apps	(Gls)
2007–2008	Pumas CCH		
2008–2011	Pumas Morelos	26	(4)
2011–2015	UNAM	20	(2)
2012	Pumas Morelos	9	(2)
2013	→ Querétaro (loan)	0	(0)
2014	→ Atlético San Luis (loan)	4	(0)
2015	→ Honvéd (loan)	2	(0)
2016–2017	Comunicaciones	13	(5)
2017–2018	Atlante	9	(0)
2018	Salamanca	11	(1)
2018	Churchill Brothers	0	(0)
2019	Kamza	0	(0)

International career
2011	Mexico U20	7	(1)
Medal record
Representing Mexico
Winner	CONCACAF U-20 Championship	2011
Third place	FIFA U-20 World Cup	2011
- * Club domestic league appearances and goals as of 2 October 2018

David Izazola Ramírez (born 23 October 1991) is a Mexican former professional footballer who played as a forward, most recently for Kamza in the Albanian Superliga.

== Club career ==
Izazola graduated from the youth academy of UNAM. He started his senior career with Pumas CCH in 2007, in the third tier. In the following season, he moved to the second tier with Pumas Morelos (B-team). In 2011, he was promoted to the senior team. On 22 January, he made his debut, coming on as a substitute for Javier Cortés in a 3–3 draw against Cruz Azul. He played sparingly during the season, with his team winning the Clausura.

Izazola spent the 2012 season with Pumas Morelos. In 2013, he was loaned out to Querétaro, but made no appearance.

On 2 August 2017, Izazola switched to fellow Mexican club Atlante. Three days later, he made his debut in a 1–0 victory against Celaya. After a loan deal with Atlético San Luis, Izazola joined Hungarian club Budapest Honvéd on a six-month long loan deal on 31 January 2015. After returning from loan, he made no further appearance in Apertura 2015 Copa MX, so subsequently he started playing with the under-20 team.

On 16 June 2016, at the age of 24, Izazola announced his retirement from professional football. He published a letter, citing the "treatment given to Mexican soccer players" as the reason behind his early retirement. However, on 24 December, he came out of retirement and signed for Guatamelan club Comunicaciones.

On 29 January 2018, Izazola signed for Spanish club Salamanca CF. He scored one goal in 11 matches, with his side winning promotion to Segunda División B. On 26 September, he joined Indian I-League club Churchill Brothers. He rescinded his contract ten days later after arriving to India on 15 October, citing the " socio-economic conditions of the country, in addition to the club's sports project" the reason behind his decision.

On 10 January 2019, Izazola joined Albanian Superliga club Kamza.

== International career ==
Izazola has been capped by Mexico at under-20 level, representing the team at 2011 FIFA U-20 World Cup where his team came third.

== Honours ==
UNAM

- Mexican Primera División: Clausura 2011

Mexico U20

- CONCACAF U-20 Championship: 2011
