= Julio Nava =

Mexican footballer (born 1989)

Personal information
- Full name: Julio César Nava García
- Date of birth: 29 December 1989 (age 36)
- Place of birth: Martínez de la Torre, Veracruz, Mexico
- Height: 1.71 m (5 ft 7 in)
- Position: Left winger

Team information
- Current team: FC Rànger's
- Number: 7

Senior career*
Years	Team	Apps	(Gls)
2007–2012	Guadalajara	33	(0)
2009–2011	→ Querétaro (loan)	33	(3)
2013	Querétaro	26	(0)
2014–2015	→ Chiapas (loan)	29	(2)
2015–2017	Chiapas	10	(0)
2016	→ Atlas (loan)	2	(0)
2017–2020	Dorados de Sinaloa	75	(5)
2020–2021	Querétaro	11	(0)
2021	Tepatitlán	13	(0)
2025	Penya Encarnada	15	(4)
2025–	FC Rànger's	21	(5)

International career
2011	Mexico U23	4	(1)
- * Club domestic league appearances and goals as of 10 June 2025

Julio Cesar Nava Garcia (Note: In this Spanish name, the first or paternal surname is Nava and the second or maternal family name is Garcia.) (born 29 December 1989, in Veracruz) is a Mexican professional footballer who plays as a left winger for Liga de Expansión MX club Tepatitlán.

== Club career ==
He made his debut in a 1–1 tie for Chivas on August 5, 2007, against UNAM Pumas. Nava was part of the Guadalajara squad that participated in the 2008 and 2012 Copa Libertadores.

On 30 August 2015, Nava returned to the fields after being banned, and he did it against his first club Guadalajara in an away match which Chiapas lost 4–1. He usually plays as a left wing-back.

== Doping ban ==
Nava was banned from sport for 8 months in 2015, after testing positive for the glucocorticoid steroid betamethasone.

== U-23 International Goals ==
No.	Date	Venue	Opponent	Score	Result	Competition	Ref.
1.	September 2, 2011	Estadio Alfonso Lastras, San Luis Potosí, Mexico	Chile	1-0	1–3	Friendly	

=== U-23 International appearances ===
As of 7 September 2011

International appearances
#	Date	Venue	Opponent	Result	Competition
1.	25 March 2011	Estadio Hidalgo, Pachuca, Mexico	(Mexico) Pachuca C.F.	2-2	Friendly
2.	27 March 2011	Estadio Nemesio Díez, Toluca, Mexico	(Mexico) Deportivo Toluca	2-1	Friendly
3.	September 2, 2011	Estadio Alfonso Lastras, San Luis Potosí, Mexico	Chile	1–3	Friendly
4.	September 7, 2011	Estadio La Granja, Curicó, Chile	Chile	2–2	Friendly
