= Oswaldo Henríquez =

Colombian footballer (born 1989)

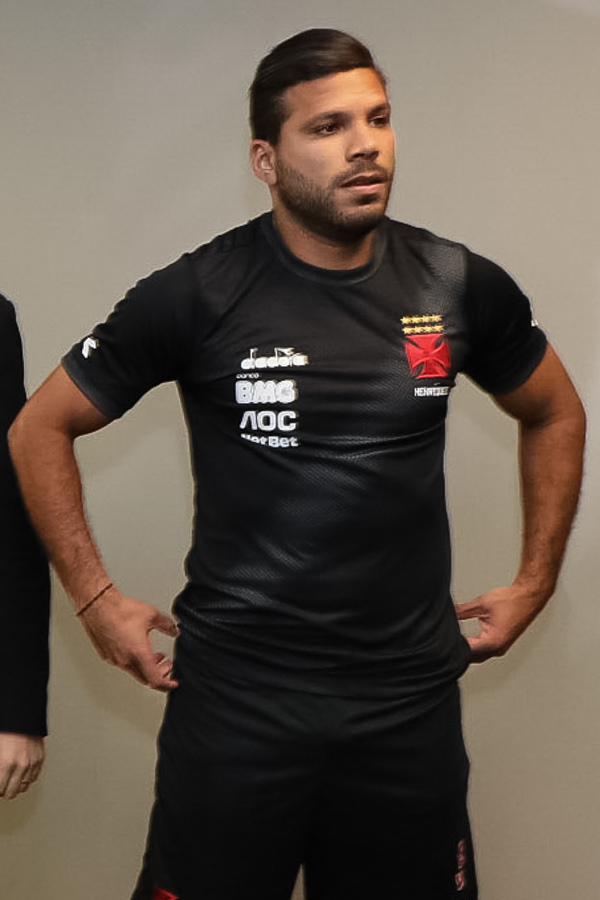
- Henríquez in 2019

Personal information
- Full name: Oswaldo Henríquez Bocanegra
- Date of birth: 10 March 1989 (age 37)
- Place of birth: Santa Marta, Magdalena, Colombia
- Height: 1.86 m (6 ft 1 in)
- Position: Centre back

Team information
- Current team: Criciúma

Youth career
- 2006–2009: Millonarios

Senior career*
Years	Team	Apps	(Gls)
2009–2016	Millonarios	126	(8)
2013–2014	→ Querétaro (loan)	21	(1)
2016–2018	Sport Recife	26	(1)
2018–2019	Vasco da Gama	37	(1)
2020	Bnei Sakhnin	6	(0)
2021	Deportivo Pasto	2	(0)
2021–2022	Águilas Doradas	31	(1)
2022–	Criciúma	0	(0)
- * Club domestic league appearances and goals as of 1 January 2021 (UTC)

Oswaldo José Henríquez Bocanegra (born 10 March 1989 in Santa Marta, Magdalena), also known as Oswaldo Henríquez, is a Colombian football defender who is currently playing for Villa Nova Atlético Clube. He is a product of the Millonarios youth system and played with Millonarios first team till November 2016.

== Career ==
=== Millionarios ===
He played for Millonarios F.C. U20 until he was called up till the senior team in 2007.

==== Querétano (loan) ====
On 2 January 2013 Henríquez signed, on loan, with Liga MX club Querétaro.

=== Sport Recife ===
On 11 January 2016 Henríquez signed a three-year contract with Brazilian club Sport Recife on a free transfer.

On 9 July 2018 Henríquez and Sport Recife agreed to terminate his contract due to the salary arrears with the player. As this, he became free to sign with another Brazilian club, Vasco da Gama

=== Vasco da Gama ===
On 3 July 2018 Vasco da Gama came to terms with Henríquez to sign him from Sport Recife. Few days later, on 15 July, both club and player signed officially.

=== Bnei Sakhnin ===
After staying without a club for seven months, on 18 August 2020, he signed in the Israeli Premier League for Bnei Sakhnin.

=== Deportivo Pasto ===
On 1 January 2021, he signed for Colombian first tier club Deportivo Pasto on a free transfer with five months still left on his contract with Bnei Sakhnin.

=== Rionegro Águila ===
On 1 July 2021, he signed for Águilas Doradas formerly known as Rionegro Águila, for an undisclosed fee.

=== Criciúma EC ===
On 21 July 2022 he left Rionegro Águila and signed for Brazilian second tier club Criciúma Esporte Clube on a free transfer.

=== Paysandu ===
On 1 January 2023, he signed for Brazilian third-tier club Paysandu Sport Club on a free transfer. His contract was then terminated on 3 May 2023, leaving him without a club for seven months.

=== Villa Nova ===
On 1 January 2024, he signed for Brazilian club Villa Nova Atlético Clube for an undisclosed fee.

== Career statistics ==
(Correct As of 9 December 2019.)

Club	Season	League			Cup		Continental		Other		Total	
Club	Season	Division	Apps	Goals	Apps	Goals	Apps	Goals	Apps	Goals	Apps	Goals
Millonarios	2009	Primera A	15	1	–		–		–		15	1
Millonarios	2010	Primera A	31	1	–		–		–		31	1
Millonarios	2011	Primera A	9	0	7	0	–		–		16	0
Millonarios	2012	Primera A	20	2	8	0	4 (Note: Appearance(s) in Copa Sudamericana.)	0	–		32	2
Millonarios	2014	Primera A	25	1	5	0	2	0	–		32	2
Millonarios	2015	Primera A	26	0	2	0	–		–		28	0
Millonarios	Total		126	5	22	0	6	0	0	0	154	5
Querétaro (loan)	2012–13	Liga MX	15	0	–		–		–		15	0
Querétaro (loan)	2013–14	Liga MX	6	0	2	0	–		–		8	0
Querétaro (loan)	Total		21	0	2	0	0	0	0	0	23	0
Sport Recife	2016	Série A	3	0	–		–		17 (Note: Ten appearances and one goal in Campeonato Pernambucano, seven appearances in Copa do Nordeste.)	1	20	1
Sport Recife	2017	Série A	23	0	1	0	6	0	8 (Note: Six appearances in Campeonato Pernambucano, two appearances in Copa do Nordeste.)	0	38	0
Sport Recife	2018	Série A	0	0	2	0	–		2 (Note: Appearance(s) in Campeonato Pernambucano.)	0	4	0
Sport Recife	Total		26	0	3	0	6	0	27	1	62	1
Vasco da Gama	2018	Série A	10	0	–		2	0	–		12	0
Vasco da Gama	2019	Série A	27	1	0	0	–		1 (Note: Appearance(s) in Campeonato Carioca.)	0	28	1
Vasco da Gama	Total		37	1	0	0	2	0	1	0	40	1
Bnei Sakhnin	2020–21	Israeli Premier League	6	0	0	0	–		1	0	7	0
Deportivo Pasto	2021	Categoría Primera A	0	0	0	0	–		0	0	0	0
Career total			216	6	27	0	14	0	29	1	286	7

== Honours ==
Millionarios

- Copa Colombia: 2011
- Categoría Primera A: 2012-II

Sport Recife

- Campeonato Pernambucano: 2017
