= Pablo Gabas =

Costa Rican footballer (born 1982)

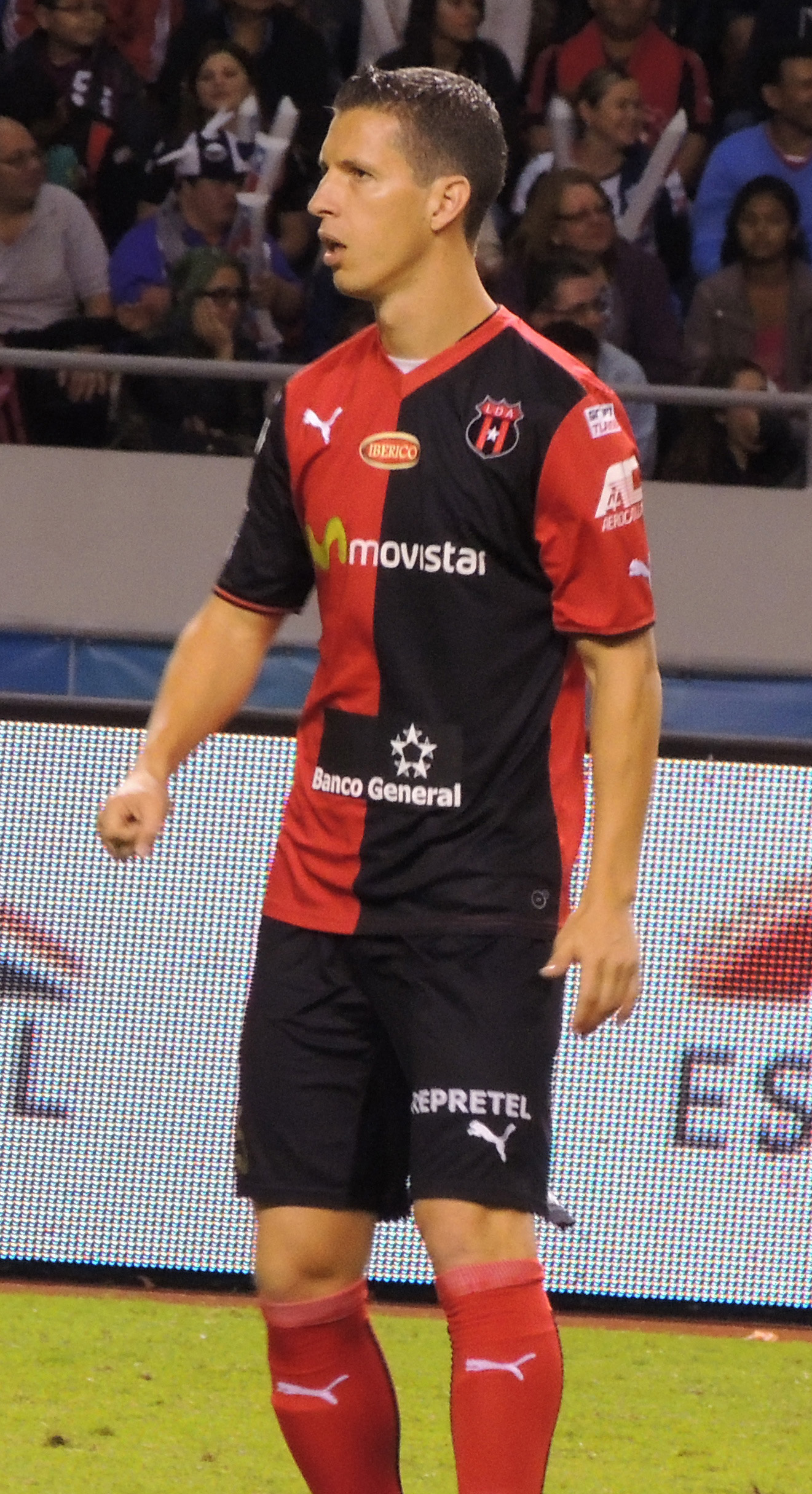

Personal information
- Full name: Pablo Daniel Antonio Gabas
- Date of birth: April 21, 1982 (age 44)
- Place of birth: Rosario, Argentina
- Height: 1.84 m (6 ft 0 in)
- Position: Midfielder

Youth career
- Newell's Old Boys

Senior career*
Years	Team	Apps	(Gls)
2000–2002	Necaxa		
2002–2003	Santa Barbara		
2003–2008	Alajuelense	105	(11)
2008–2009	Necaxa	20	(1)
2009–2013	Alajuelense	75	(16)
2013	Querétaro	10	(0)
2014	Chiapas	2	(0)
2014–	Alajuelense	32	(4)

International career
2012	Costa Rica	2	(0)
- * Club domestic league appearances and goals as of 15 April 2015

Pablo Daniel Antonio Gabas (born 21 April 1982) is a professional football player who last played for Alajuelense in Primera División. Born in Argentina, he played for the Costa Rica national team.

He made his debut in Costa Rican Primera División back on 2002 playing with AD Santa Barbara on a loan from Necaxa and due his high performances with them he was signed by one of the 2 most important teams in Costa Rica, LD Alajuelense. With Alajuelense in the 2014–15 CONCACAF Champions League, he scored twice in the second leg of the semi-final against the Montreal Impact of Canada.

He is currently applying for Costa Rican citizenship after living nine years in Costa Rica, his wife coming from Costa Rica. He made his debut with the Costa Rica national football team on February 29, 2012, against Wales.
