= Delfines F.C. =

Delfines
- Full name: Delfines Fútbol Club
- Nickname: La Marea Naranja
- Founded: 18 August 2012; 13 years ago
- Dissolved: 30 May 2014; 11 years ago
- Ground: Estadio Unidad Deportiva Campus II de la UNACAR; Ciudad del Carmen, Campeche, Mexico
- Capacity: 8,985
- Owner: Grupo Delfines
- Chairman: Verónica González
- Manager: José Marroquín
- Clausura 2014: DNQ
Home colours	Away colours	Third colours

Delfines Fútbol Club was a Mexican football club based in Ciudad del Carmen, Campeche. The team last played in the Liga de Ascenso de México, the second tier of the Mexican football league system. The team played their home matches at the Estadio Unidad Deportiva Campus II de la UNACAR.

== History ==
The team was founded on July 20, 2011 and originally played in the Segunda División de México, the third tier of the Mexican football league system. On May 20, 2013 it was announced that the team owner Grupo Delfines bought the Ascenso MX club Pumas Morelos and relocated the team from Cuernavaca, Morelos to Ciudad del Carmen, Campeche, thus creating the Delfines F.C. franchise.

Due to the team's origin, the team's squad was made up of mostly former Pumas Morelos players and some members from the previous Delfines franchise who played in the Segunda División.

The team only participated for one season in the Ascenso MX, since on May 30, 2014, it was disaffiliated by the FMF because its owner was subjected to criminal proceedings.
