= 2011–12 Club Necaxa season =

Necaxa
2011–12 season
- Chairman: Luis Ogarrio Kalb
- Manager: Francisco Ramírez (May 26, 2011–Oct. 23, 2011); Luis García (Oct. 24, 2011–Dec. 6, 2011); Milton Queiroz (Dec. 6, 2011–2012)
- Stadium: Estadio Victoria
- Apertura 2011: 6^{th.}
Home colours	Away colours

The 2011–12 Necaxa was the second season of Necaxa on the Liga de Ascenso . The season is split into two tournaments—the Torneo Apertura and the Torneo Clausura—each with identical formats and each contested by the same sixteen teams. Necaxa will begin their season on July 29, 2011, against Mérida, Necaxa played their homes games on Fridays at 8:10pm local time.

== Torneo Apertura ==
=== Squad ===
Note: Flags indicate national team as defined under FIFA eligibility rules; some limited exceptions apply. Players may hold more than one non-FIFA nationality.

No.	Pos.	Nation	Player
1	GK	MEX	Iván Vázquez
2	DF	MEX	Luis Omar Hernández
3	DF	ARG	Pablo Quatrocchi (Captain)
4	MF	MEX	Jorge Zataraín
5	MF	MEX	Luis Ernesto Pérez
6	DF	MEX	Daniel Cervantes
7	FW	MEX	Alejandro Castillo
8	MF	BRA	Everaldo Barbosa
9	FW	MEX	Victor Lojero
10	FW	URU	Sergio Blanco
11	MF	MEX	Carlos Alberto Hurtado
12	GK	MEX	Carlos Alberto Trejo
13	FW	MEX	Juan Carlos Mosqueda

No.	Pos.	Nation	Player
14	DF	MEX	Luis Alberto Padilla
15	DF	MEX	Marvin de la Cruz
17	MF	MEX	Jesús Palacios
18	MF	MEX	Juan José de la Cruz
19	DF	MEX	Fernando López
20	MF	MEX	Jesús Isijara
21	MF	MEX	Luis Alberto Valdés
22	MF	MEX	Luis Francisco García
23	DF	MEX	Pierre Ibarra
27	FW	MEX	Ezequiel Orozco
29	FW	URU	Héctor Gimenez
31	FW	MEX	Alfredo Vázquez
33	DF	MEX	José Antonio Castro

=== Regular season ===
Win Draw Loss

=== Apertura 2011 results ===
July 29, 2011 Round 1	Necaxa	1 – 0	Mérida	Estadio Victoria, Aguascalientes
20:10	Lojero 14'	report		Referee: Baruch Absalón Castellanos

August 6, 2011 Round 2	León	2 – 0	Necaxa	Estadio Nou Camp, León, Guanajuato
20:00	Cruz 63'; Maz 87' (pen.)	Report		Referee: Obed Eliud Gómez

August 12, 2011 Round 3	Correcaminos UAT	1 – 1	Necaxa	Estadio Marte R. Gomez, Ciudad Victoria, Tamaulipas
20:30	Sara 33'	report	Blanco 24'	Referee: Osvaldo Hernández

August 19, 2011 Round 4	Necaxa	3 – 2	Indios	Estadio Victoria, Aguascalientes
20:10	Quatrocchi 35'; Lojero 71'; Palacios 78'	Report	Alvarado 73'; Bernárdez 85'	Referee: Roberto Ríos

August 28, 2011 Round 5	Neza	1 – 0	Necaxa	Estadio Neza 86, Ciudad Nezahualcóyotl
12:00	Rosas 31'	Report		Referee: Gerardo García Acevedo

September 9, 2011 Round 6	Necaxa	1 – 1	Lobos BUAP	Estadio Victoria, Aguascalientes
20:10	Mendez 40' (o.g.)	Report	Ceballos 78'	Referee: Eduardo Galván Basulto

September 16, 2011 Round 7	Leones Negros	0 – 1	Necaxa	Estadio Jalisco, Guadalajara, Jalisco
20:45		Report	A. Vázquez 69'	Referee: Mario Alcantara González

September 23, 2011 Round 8	Necaxa	1 – 0	Pumas Morelos	Estadio Victoria, Aguascalientes
20:10	Quatrocchi 70'	Report		Referee: Angel Monroy Bello

October 1, 2011 Round 9	Irapuato	0 – 1	Necaxa	Estadio Sergio León Chavez, Irapuato
19:00		Report	Lojero 66'	Referee: Baruch Absalón Castellanos

October 7, 2011 Round 10	Necaxa	0 – 1	La Piedad	Estadio Victoria, Aguascalientes
20:10		Report	Nurse 79'	Referee: Obed Eliud Gómez

October 15, 2011 Round 11	Veracruz	1 – 1	Necaxa	Estadio Luis de la Fuente, Veracruz
16:00	Ruiz 57'		Ibarra 82'	Referee: León Vicente Barajas

October 21, 2011 Round 12	Necaxa	1 – 1	Celaya	Estadio Victoria, Aguascalientes
20:10	Cervantes 90+3'		Barroche 82'	Referee: Cirilo Arturo Cruz

October 30, 2011 Round 13	Cruz Azul Hidalgo	2 – 1	Necaxa	Estadio 10 de Diciembre, Ciudad Cooporativa Cruz Azul Hidalgo
12:00	Galván 77', 86'		Lojero 76'	Referee: Ángel Monroy Bello

November 4, 2011 Round 14	Necaxa	2 – 1	Altamira	Estadio Victoria, Aguascalientes
20:10	Lojero 1'; Castillo 3'		Quatrocchi 60' (o.g.)	Referee: César Esteban Moreno

November 19, 2011 Round 15	Dorados	1 – 1	Necaxa	Estadio Banorte, Culiacán, Sinaloa
19:00	Torres 41'		Lojero 71'	Referee: Gerardo García

=== Final phase ===
November 24, 2011 Quarter-finals	Necaxa	0 – 1	Neza	Estadio Victoria, Aguascalientes
20:00		Report	Luciano Emílio 42'; Mejía (red card) 60'	Referee: Eduardo Galván Basulto

November 27, 2011 Quarter-finals	Neza	2 – 2	Necaxa	Estadio Neza 86, Ciudad Nezahualcóyotl
12:00	Prieto 29'; Luciano Emílio 78'	Report	Isijara 5'; Lojero 42'; Castillo (red card) 90+4'	Referee: Baruch Absalón Castellanos

Neza advanced 3 – 2 on aggregate

=== Goalscorers ===
Position	Nation	Name	Goals scored
1.	(Mexico)	Víctor Lojero	7
2.	(Argentina)	Pablo Quatrocchi	2
3.	(Uruguay)	Sergio Blanco	1
3.	(Mexico)	Alejandro Castillo	1
3.	(Mexico)	Daniel Cervantes	1
3.	(Mexico)	Pierre Ibarra	1
3.	(Mexico)	Jesús Isijara	1
3.	(Mexico)	Jesús Palacios	1
3.	(Mexico)	Alfredo Vázquez	1
3.		Own goal	1
TOTAL			17

=== Results summary ===
Overall								Home						Away					
Pld	W	D	L	GF	GA	GD	Pts	W	D	L	GF	GA	GD	W	D	L	GF	GA	GD
15	6	5	4	15	14	+1	23	4	2	1	9	6	+3	2	3	3	6	8	−2

Source: Apertura 2011 results

==== Results by round ====
Round	1	2	3	4	5	6	7	8	9	10	11	12	13	14	15
Ground	H	A	A	H	A	H	A	H	A	H	A	H	A	H	A
Result	W	L	D	W	L	D	W	W	W	L	D	D	L	W	D
Position	4	8	10	6	6	9	7	4	2	3	4	6	6	6	6

Source: Apertura 2011 results and mediotiempo.com
A = Away; H = Home; W = Win; D = Draw; L = Loss

== Transfers ==
=== In ===
#	Pos	Nat	Player	Age	From	Date	Notes
16	MF	(Mexico)	José Joaquín Martínez	24	América	December 17, 2011	
10	MF	(Argentina)	Juan Manuel Cavallo	30	(Argentina) Sportivo Desamparados	December 18, 2011	
33	DF	(Mexico)	César Armando Saldivar	28	La Piedad	December 22, 2011	
29	MF	(Mexico)	Jaime Correa	32	San Luis	December 22, 2011	
30	DF	(Mexico)	Alejandro Mercado	28	Dorados	December 22, 2011	
24	DF	(Mexico)	René Ruvalcaba	29	León	December 22, 2011	

=== Out ===
Pos	Nat	Player	Age	To	Date	Notes
DF	(Argentina)	Pablo Quatrocchi	37	Retire	November 27, 2011	
DF	(Mexico)	José Antonio Castro	31	Estudiantes Tecos	December 5, 2011	

== Torneo Clausura ==
=== Pre-Season Games ===
Win Draw Loss

December 17, 2011 Friendly	Necaxa	5 – 1	Curtidores	Estadio Victoria, Aguascalientes
12:00	Ibarra 3'; Orozco 9'; Valdés 39'; González 54'; Ornelas 76'	Report	Brito 68'

December 22, 2011 Friendly	Necaxa	2 – 2	América	Estadio Victoria, Aguascalientes
19:00	Lojero 45'; Orozco 73'	Report	Benítez 25'; Márquez 82'

December 28, 2011 Friendly	Necaxa	1 – 1	Celaya	Casa Club Necaxa, Aguascalientes
12:00	Cavallo 68'	Report	Barroche 36'

December 30, 2011 Friendly	Necaxa	2 – 1	Guadalajara U-20	Casa Club Necaxa, Aguascalientes
12:00

=== Squad ===
Note: Flags indicate national team as defined under FIFA eligibility rules; some limited exceptions apply. Players may hold more than one non-FIFA nationality.

No.	Pos.	Nation	Player
1	GK	MEX	Iván Vázquez
2	DF	MEX	Luis Omar Hernández
4	MF	MEX	Jorge Zataraín
5	MF	MEX	Luis Pérez
6	DF	MEX	Daniel Cervantes
7	FW	MEX	Alejandro Castillo
8	MF	BRA	Everaldo Barbosa
9	FW	MEX	Victor Lojero
10	FW	ARG	Juan Manuel Cavallo
11	MF	MEX	Carlos Alberto Hurtado
12	GK	MEX	Carlos Alberto Trejo
13	FW	MEX	Juan Carlos Mosqueda
14	DF	MEX	Luis Alberto Padilla
15	DF	MEX	Marvin de la Cruz
16	MF	MEX	José Joaquín Martínez

No.	Pos.	Nation	Player
17	MF	MEX	Jesús Palacios
18	MF	MEX	Juan José de la Cruz
19	DF	MEX	Fernando López
20	MF	MEX	Jesús Isijara
21	MF	MEX	Luis Alberto Valdés
22	MF	MEX	Luis Francisco García
23	DF	MEX	Pierre Ibarra
24	DF	MEX	René Ruvalcaba
25	GK	MEX	Roberto Salcedo
26	FW	URU	Paulo Pezzolano
27	FW	MEX	Ezequiel Orozco
29	MF	MEX	Jaime Correa
30	DF	MEX	Alejandro Mercado
31	FW	MEX	Alfredo Vázquez
33	DF	MEX	César Armando Saldivar

=== Regular season ===
Win Draw Loss

=== Clausura 2012 results ===
January 7, 2012 Round 1	Mérida	2 – 0	Necaxa	Estadio Carlos Iturralde, Mérida
19:00	Jiménez 9'; Guzmán 67'			Referee: Roberto Rios Jácome

January 13, 2012 Round 2	Necaxa	1 – 1	León	Estadio Victoria, Aguascalientes
20:00	Martínez 2'		Nieves 65'	Referee: Oscar Villagómez

January 20, 2012 Round 3	Necaxa	1 – 0	Correcaminos UAT	Estadio Victoria, Aguascalientes
20:00	Zataraín 56'			Referee: Víctor Bisguerra

February 3, 2012 Round 5	Necaxa	0 – 2	Neza	Estadio Victoria, Aguascalientes
20:00			Rosas 73'; Luciano Emilio 90+3'	Referee: José Roberto Méndez

February 10, 2012 Round 6	Lobos BUAP	1 – 2	Necaxa	Estadio Universitario BUAP, Puebla
16:00	Castillo 81'		Cavallo 40'; Ruvalcaba 83'	Referee: Luis Enrique Santander

February 17, 2012 Round 7	Necaxa	1 – 0	Leones Negros	Estadio Victoria, Aguascalientes
20:00	Lojero 29'			Referee: Quetzalli Alvarado

February 25, 2012 Round 8	Pumas Morelos	1 – 1	Necaxa	Estadio Centenario, Coyoacan
16:00	Servín 63'		Lojero 45'	Referee: Gerardo García

March 2, 2012 Round 9	Necaxa	3 – 1	Irapuato	Estadio Victoria, Aguascalientes
20:00	Mosqueda 44' (o.g.); Lojero 67' (pen.), 86'		Cruz 11'	Referee: Erick Yair Miranda

March 11, 2012 Round 10	La Piedad	1 – 2	Necaxa	Estadio Juan N. López, La Piedad
12:30	González 70'		Cavallo 47'; Lojero 61' (pen.)	Referee: Carlos Manuel Martínez

March 16, 2012 Round 11	Necaxa	3 – 0	Veracruz	Estadio Victoria, Aguascalientes
20:00	Lojero 4', 49', 87'			Referee: Eduardo Galván

March 24, 2012 Round 12	Celaya	2 – 2	Necaxa	Estadio Miguel Aleman, Celaya
20:50	Torres 23'; J. Sánchez 52'		J. Sánchez 46' (o.g.); Cavallo 73'	Referee: Luis Enrique Santander

March 30, 2012 Round 13	Necaxa	1 – 0	Cruz Azul Hidalgo	Estadio Victoria, Aguascalientes
20:00	Lojero 72'			Referee: Quetzalli Alvarado

April 6, 2012 Round 14	Altamira	2 – 0	Necaxa	Estadio Altamira, Altamira
19:00	Vázquez 22'; Mascareñas 80'			Referee: Oscar Bernardo Villagómez

April 13, 2012 Round 15	Necaxa	3 – 0	Dorados	Estadio Victoria, Aguascalientes
20:00	Pezzolano 23'; Lojero 72', 83'			Referee: Roberto Rios

=== Final phase ===
April 18, 2012 Quarter-finals	Leones Negros	1 – 1	Necaxa	Estadio Jalisco, Guadalajara
20:50	Valdovinos 90+3'	Report	Correa 45'	Referee: Erick Yair Miranda

April 21, 2012 Quarter-finals	Necaxa	0 – 0	Leones Negros	Estadio Victoria, Aguascalientes
17:00				Referee: Víctor Bisguerra

Necaxa advanced because of their better position on the league table

April 25, 2012 Semifinals	Lobos BUAP	3 – 0	Necaxa	Estadio Universitario BUAP, Puebla
16:00	Ramírez 46', 57'; Jiménez 49'	Report		Referee: Oscar Bernardo Villagómez

April 28, 2012 Semifinals	Necaxa	1 – 0	Lobos BUAP	Estadio Victoria, Aguascalientes
18:00	Castillo 26'	Report		Referee: Luis Enrique Santander

Lobos BUAP advanced 3 – 1 on aggregate

=== Goalscorers ===
Position	Nation	Name	Goals scored
1.	(Mexico)	Víctor Lojero	11
2.	(Argentina)	Juan Manuel Cavallo	3
3.		Own Goals	2
4.	(Mexico)	Alejandro Castillo	1
4.	(Mexico)	Jaime Correa	1
4.	(Mexico)	José Joaquín Martínez	1
4.	(Uruguay)	Paulo Pezzolano	1
4.	(Mexico)	René Ruvalcaba	1
4.	(Mexico)	Jorge Zataraín	1
TOTAL			22

=== Results summary ===
Overall								Home						Away					
Pld	W	D	L	GF	GA	GD	Pts	W	D	L	GF	GA	GD	W	D	L	GF	GA	GD
14	8	3	3	20	13	+7	27	6	1	1	13	4	+9	2	2	2	7	9	−2

Source: Clausura 2012 results

==== Results by round ====
Round	1	2	3	4	5	6	7	8	9	10	11	12	13	14	15
Ground	A	H	H	A	H	A	H	A	H	A	H	A	H	A	H
Result	L	D	W	P	L	W	W	D	W	W	W	D	W	L	W
Position	14	13	9	12	14	10	8	7	4	2	2	3	3	3	3

Source: Clausura 2012 results and mediotiempo.com
A = Away; H = Home; W = Win; D = Draw; L = Loss; P = Postponed
