= Liga de Ascenso Bicentenario 2010 Liguilla Final =

- Event: Liga de Ascenso Bicentenario 2010 Liguilla
Necaxa	León
(Mexico)	(Mexico)
4	2
- On aggregate

First leg
Necaxa	León
3	0
- Date: 5 May 2010
- Venue: Estadio Victoria, Aguascalientes, Aguascalientes
- Referee: Mario Alonso Villa García (Mexico)

Second leg
León	Necaxa
2	1
- Date: 8 May 2010
- Venue: Estadio Nou Camp, León, Guanajuato
- Referee: Fernando Guerrero Ramírez (Mexico)

The Bicentenario 2010 Liguilla Final is a two-legged football match-up to determine the Bicentenario 2010 champion.

== Final rules ==
Like other match-ups in the knockout round, the teams will play two games, one at each team's home stadium. As the highest seeded team determined at the beginning of the Liguilla, León was to have home-field advantage for the second leg. If the teams remained tied after 90 minutes of play during the 2nd leg, extra time will be used, followed by a penalty shootout if necessary.

== Final summary ==
=== First leg ===
2010-05-05
18:00

Necaxa	3 – 0	León
Chávez 29'; Romero 38'; Mosqueda 90+2'

Estadio Victoria
Aguascalientes, Aguascalientes
Referee: Mario Alonso Villa García (Mexico)

Necaxa	León

NECAXA:
GK	45	(Mexico) Pedro Hernández
DF	34	(Mexico) Luis Alberto Padilla	(yellow card) 63'	(substituted off) 66'
DF	33	(Argentina) Pablo Quatrocchi (c)
DF	48	(Mexico) Arturo Javier Ledesma
MF	46	(Mexico) Juan Carlos Mosqueda
MF	47	(Mexico) Javier Saavedra
MF	51	(Mexico) Carlos Alberto Hurtado		(substituted off) 77'
MF	40	(Mexico) Juan de Dios Hernández		(substituted off) 72'
MF	50	(Mexico) Paulo César Chávez	(yellow card) 37'
FW	56	(Uruguay) Nelson Sebastián Maz
FW	59	(Mexico) Mauricio Romero Alvizu
Substitutes:
GK	52	(Mexico) Luis Alfonso Gutiérrez
DF	57	(Mexico) Obed Isai Rincón		(substituted on) 66'
MF	38	(Mexico) Marco Antonio Reyna		(substituted on) 77'
MF	58	(Mexico) Oscar Zea
FW	32	(Mexico) Luis Valdés
FW	44	(Mexico) Jesús Mendoza
FW	49	(Mexico) Alejandro Castillo		(substituted on) 72'
Manager:
(Mexico) Omar Arellano Nuño

LEÓN:
GK	58	(Mexico) Antonio Pérez
DF	17	(Mexico) Orlando Pineda
DF	21	(Paraguay) Denis Caniza (c)
DF	34	(Mexico) Aldo Polo
MF	30	(Mexico) Alejandro Corona	(red card) 48'
MF	22	(Mexico) Ignacio Carrasco	(yellow card) 39'	(substituted off) 45'
MF	26	(Mexico) Julio Ceja
MF	10	(Uruguay) Mateo Figoli	(yellow card) 61' (yellow-red card) 82'
FW	12	(Mexico) Mario Alejandro Ruíz		(substituted off) 57'
FW	19	(Argentina) Carlos Casartelli	(yellow card) 35'	(substituted off) 51'
FW	9	(Mexico) Luis Orozco		(substituted off) 79'
Substitutes:
GK	1	(Mexico) Éder Patiño
DF	14	(Mexico) René Ruvalcaba
DF	18	(Mexico) Emiliano Rodríguez
DF	35	(Mexico) Ignacio González
MF	6	(Mexico) Gabino Velasco	(yellow card) 84'	(substituted on) 51'
MF	7	(Mexico) Hibert Ruíz		(substituted on) 45'
FW	8	(Mexico) Ismael Valadéz		(substituted on) 79'
Manager:
(Mexico) José Luis Salgado

Assistant referees:
(Mexico) Andres Hernández Delgado
(Mexico) Miguel Ángel Hernández Paredes
Fourth official:
(Mexico) Cesar Esteban Moreno Roa

=== Second leg ===
2010-05-08
20:00

León	2 – 1	Necaxa
Corona 50'; Valadéz 71'		Maz 54'

Estadio Nou Camp
León, Guanajuato
Referee: Fernando Guerrero Ramírez (Mexico)

León	Necaxa

LEÓN:
GK	58	(Mexico) Antonio Pérez
DF	17	(Mexico) Orlando Pineda		(substituted off) 72'
DF	21	(Paraguay) Denis Caniza (c)	(yellow card) 62'
DF	34	(Mexico) Aldo Polo	(yellow card) 8'
MF	30	(Mexico) Alejandro Corona	(yellow card) 90+2'
MF	7	(Mexico) Hibert Ruíz
MF	26	(Mexico) Julio Ceja	(yellow card) 51'
MF	6	(Mexico) Gabino Velasco		(substituted off) 59'
FW	12	(Mexico) Mario Alejandro Ruíz		(substituted off) 68'
FW	19	(Argentina) Carlos Casartelli
FW	9	(Mexico) Luis Orozco
Substitutes:
GK	1	(Mexico) Éder Patiño
DF	14	(Mexico) René Ruvalcaba
DF	18	(Mexico) Emiliano Rodríguez
DF	35	(Mexico) Ignacio González
MF	22	(Mexico) Ignacio Carrasco		(substituted on) 68'
FW	8	(Mexico) Ismael Valadéz		(substituted on) 59'
FW	11	(Mexico) Luis Nieves		(substituted on) 72'
Manager:
(Mexico) José Luis Salgado

NECAXA:
GK	45	(Mexico) Pedro Hernández	(yellow card) 63'
DF	34	(Mexico) Luis Alberto Padilla	(yellow card) 8'
DF	33	(Argentina) Pablo Quatrocchi (c)
DF	48	(Mexico) Arturo Javier Ledesma
MF	46	(Mexico) Juan Carlos Mosqueda		(substituted off) 45'
MF	47	(Mexico) Javier Saavedra
MF	51	(Mexico) Carlos Alberto Hurtado	(yellow card) 48'	(substituted off) 86'
MF	30	(Brazil) Everaldo Barbosa	(yellow card) 54'
MF	50	(Mexico) Paulo César Chávez	(yellow card) 37'
FW	56	(Uruguay) Nelson Sebastián Maz
FW	59	(Mexico) Mauricio Romero Alvizu		(substituted off) 65'
Substitutes:
GK	52	(Mexico) Luis Alfonso Gutiérrez
DF	57	(Mexico) Obed Isai Rincón		(substituted on) 86'
MF	38	(Mexico) Marco Antonio Reyna
MF	58	(Mexico) Oscar Zea
MF	40	(Mexico) Juan de Dios Hernández	(yellow card) 51'	(substituted on) 45'
FW	44	(Mexico) Jesús Mendoza
FW	49	(Mexico) Alejandro Castillo	(yellow card) 79'	(substituted on) 65'
Manager:
(Mexico) Omar Arellano Nuño

(Mexico) Víctor Javier Gutiérrez Martínez
(Mexico) Juan Carlos Salinas Salinas
Fourth official:
(Mexico) Israel Perea Vazquez
