= 2010–11 Club Necaxa season =

Mexican sporting season

The 2010–11 Club Necaxa season' was the 64th professional season of Mexico's top-flight football league. The season is split into two tournaments—the Torneo Apertura and the Torneo Clausura—each with identical formats and each contested by the same eighteen teams. Necaxa will begin their season on July 24, 2010, against Chiapas, Necaxa played their homes games on Fridays at 8:00pm. Necaxa was relegated to the Liga de Ascenso after having the lowest percentage of points in the 2010 Apertura and Clausura 2011 seasons.

== Torneo Apertura ==
=== Squad ===
Note: Flags indicate national team as defined under FIFA eligibility rules; some limited exceptions apply. Players may hold more than one non-FIFA nationality.

No.	Pos.	Nation	Player
1	GK	MEX	Iván Vázquez
3	DF	ARG	Pablo Quatrocchi (Captain)
4	DF	MEX	Luis Alberto Padilla
8	MF	BRA	Everaldo Barbosa
12	MF	MEX	Luis Ernesto Pérez
13	MF	MEX	Juan Carlos Mosqueda
14	FW	ARG	Darío Gandín

No.	Pos.	Nation	Player
15	MF	MEX	Paulo César Chávez
17	MF	MEX	Jesús Palacios
18	DF	MEX	Fernando López
22	MF	MEX	Luis Francisco García
25	GK	MEX	Luis Alfonso Gutiérrez
27	FW	MEX	Ezequiel Orozco

=== Out on loan ===
No.	Pos.	Nation	Player
-	MF	MEX	Israel López (loan from Cruz Azul)
46	MF	MEX	Juan Carlos Mosqueda (loan from Club América)
47	DF	MEX	Javier Saavedra (loan from Tigres)
-	FW	MEX	Ismael Íñiguez (loan from Pumas)
-	DF	MEX	Arturo Ledesma (loan from Chivas)
50	MF	MEX	Paulo César Chávez (loan from Chivas)

No.	Pos.	Nation	Player
-	GK	MEX	Alfonso Blanco (loan from Pachuca)
-	FW	MEX	Juan de Dios Hernández (loan to Cruz Azul)
-	DF	MEX	Luis Omar Hernández (loan to San Luis)
-	GK	MEX	Alejandro Alvarez (loan to Puebla)
-	MF	MEX	Luis Alonso Sandoval (loan to Club América)

=== Regular season ===
July 24, 2010 Round 1	Chiapas	1 – 1	Necaxa	Estadio Victor Manuel Reyna, Tuxtla Gutierrez
5:00pm	Danilinho 90+2'	Report	Gandín 70'	Referee: Miguel Ángel Flores

July 30, 2010 Round 2	Necaxa	0 – 2	UANL	Estadio Victoria, Aguascalientes
8:00pm		Report	Lobos 37'; Acuña 41'	Referee: Jaime Herrera Garduño

August 7, 2010 Round 3	Atlas	0 – 1	Necaxa	Estadio Jalisco, Guadalajara
8:45pm		Report	Gandín 25'	Referee: Marco Antonio Rodríguez

August 13, 2010 Round 4	Necaxa	1 – 1	Querétaro	Estadio Victoria, Aguascalientes
8:00pm	Quatrocchi 26'	Report	Altamirano 60'	Referee: Jorege Gasso

August 22, 2010 Round 5	Morelia	1 – 0	Necaxa	Estadio Morelos, Morelia
12:00pm	Márquez Lugo 75'	Report		Referee: Francisco Chacón

August 29, 2010 Round 6	América	1 – 1	Necaxa	Estadio Azteca, Mexico City
4:30pm	Márquez 76'	Report	Gandín 42'	Referee: Genaro Medrano

September 10, 2010 Round 7	Necaxa	1 – 1	Toluca	Estadio Victoria, Aguascalientes
8:00pm	Rincón 88'	Report	Mancilla 72'	Referee: Roberto García

September 18, 2010 Round 8	Santos Laguna	2 – 1	Necaxa	Estadio Corona, Torreón
7:00pm	Baloy 45'; Benítez 90+3'	Report	Mosqueda 39'	Referee: José Alfredo Peñaloza

September 24, 2010 Round 9	Necaxa	2 – 1	Cruz Azul	Estadio Victoria, Aguascalientes
8:00pm	Gandín 13' (pen.); Pavlovich 36'	Report	Giménez 66' (pen.)	Referee: Fabricio Morales

October 2, 2010 Round 10	Monterrey	2 – 1	Necaxa	Estadio Tecnológico, Monterrey
5:00pm	Suazo 12' de Nigris 26'	Report	Quatrocchi 90'	Referee: Mauricio Morales

October 8, 2010 Round 11	Necaxa	1 – 0	Puebla	Estadio Victoria, Aguascalientes
8:00pm	Pavlovich 28'	Report		Referee: Miguel Ángel Ayala

October 16, 2010 Round 12	Guadalajara	1 – 0	Necaxa	Estadio Omnilife, Zapopan
7:00pm	Fabián 68'	Report		Referee: Jaime Herrera

October 22, 2010 Round 13	Necaxa	0 – 2	San Luis	Estadio Victoria, Aguascalientes
8:00pm		Report	Matellán 22'; Arroyo 90+2'	Referee: Armando Archundia

October 26, 2010 Round 14	Estudiantes Tecos	0 – 2	Necaxa	Estadio Tres de Marzo, Zapopan
9:00pm		Report	Barbosa 22'; Orozco 77'	Referee: Paul Delgadillo

October 31, 2010 Round 15	Necaxa	1 – 2	Atlante	Estadio Victoria, Aguascalientes
5:00pm	Pérez 61'	Report	Amione 70'; Fano 74'	Referee: Miguel Ángel Flores

November 7, 2010 Round 16	UNAM	2 – 0	Necaxa	Estadio Olímpico Universitario, Mexico City
12:00pm	Castro 76'; López 90+1'	Report		Referee: Francisco Chacón

November 12, 2010 Round 17	Necaxa	1 – 2	Pachuca	Estadio Victoria, Aguascalientes
8:00pm	Cervantes 33'	Report	López 7'; Manso 15'	Referee: Rafael Medina

=== Goalscorers ===
Position	Nation	Name	Goals scored
1	(Argentina)	Darío Gandín	4
2	(Argentina)	Pablo Quatrocchi	2
2	(Argentina)	Nicolás Pavlovich	2
3	(Brazil)	Everaldo Barbosa	1
3	(Mexico)	Daniel Cervantes	1
3	(Mexico)	Juan Carlos Mosqueda	1
3	(Mexico)	Ezequiel Orozco	1
3	(Mexico)	Luis Ernesto Pérez	1
3	(Mexico)	Obed Isaí Rincón	1
TOTAL			14

=== Results ===
==== Results summary ====
Overall								Home						Away					
Pld	W	D	L	GF	GA	GD	Pts	W	D	L	GF	GA	GD	W	D	L	GF	GA	GD
17	4	4	9	14	21	−7	16	2	2	4	7	11	−4	2	2	5	7	10	−3

Last updated: 15 January 2011.
Source: Apertura 2010 results

==== Results by round ====
Round	1	2	3	4	5	6	7	8	9	10	11	12	13	14	15	16	17
Ground	A	H	A	H	A	A	H	A	H	A	H	A	H	A	H	A	H
Result	D	L	W	D	L	D	D	L	W	L	W	L	L	W	L	L	L
Position	8	12	12	10	11	12	13	15	14	15	13	14	15	12	14	15	15

Updated to match(es) played on 15 January 2011. Source: Apertura 2010 results and mediotiempo.com
A = Away; H = Home; W = Win; D = Draw; L = Loss

== Torneo Clausura ==
=== Squad ===
Note: Flags indicate national team as defined under FIFA eligibility rules; some limited exceptions apply. Players may hold more than one non-FIFA nationality.

No.	Pos.	Nation	Player
1	GK	MEX	Iván Vázquez
2	DF	MEX	Arturo Ledesma
3	DF	ARG	Pablo Quatrocchi (Captain)
4	DF	MEX	Luis Alberto Padilla
5	DF	MEX	Fernando Salazar
6	DF	MEX	Obed Isaí Rincón
7	FW	ECU	Cristian Suárez
8	MF	BRA	Everaldo Barbosa
10	FW	URU	Sergio Blanco
11	MF	MEX	Luis Alonso Sandoval
12	MF	MEX	Luis Pérez
13	MF	MEX	Juan Carlos Mosqueda
14	FW	ARG	Darío Gandín

No.	Pos.	Nation	Player
15	MF	MEX	Paulo Chávez
17	MF	MEX	Jesús Palacios
19	FW	MEX	Ulises Mendivil
20	FW	MEX	Ismael Íñiguez
21	GK	MEX	Pedro Hernández
22	DF	MEX	Luis Francisco García
23	MF	MEX	Juan Carlos Silva
26	GK	MEX	Óscar Pérez
27	FW	MEX	Ezequiel Orozco
28	DF	MEX	Pierre Ibarra
30	MF	MEX	Gil Cordero
33	DF	MEX	José Antonio Castro
43	DF	MEX	Daniel Cervantes

=== Regular season ===
January 7, 2011 Round 1	Necaxa	0 – 1	Chiapas	Estadio Victoria, Aguascalientes
8:10pm		Report	Manso 48'	Referee: Fernando Guerrero

January 15, 2011 Round 2	UANL	1 – 0	Necaxa	Estadio Universitario, San Nicolás
7:00pm	Mancilla 65' (pen.)	Report		Referee: Marco Antonio Rodríguez

January 21, 2011 Round 3	Necaxa	0 – 1	Atlas	Estadio Victoria, Aguascalientes
8:10pm		Report	Moreno 72'	Referee: Fabricio Morales

January 29, 2011 Round 4	Querétaro	1 – 0	Necaxa	Estadio Corregidora, Querétaro
5:00pm	Cortés 59'	Report		Referee: Juan Genaro Medrano

February 4, 2011 Round 5	Necaxa	0 – 0	Morelia	Estadio Victoria, Aguascalientes
8:10pm		Report		Referee: Miguel Ángel Ortega

February 11, 2011 Round 6	Necaxa	1 – 0	América	Estadio Victoria, Aguascalientes
8:10pm	Blanco 35'	Report		Referee: Roberto García

February 20, 2011 Round 7	Toluca	2 – 3	Necaxa	Estadio Nemesio Díez, Toluca
12:00pm	Ayoví 44'; Esquivel 54'	Report	Íñiguez 58'; Suárez 77', 80'	Referee: José Alfredo Peñaloza

February 25, 2011 Round 8	Necaxa	1 – 0	Santos Laguna	Estadio Victoria, Aguascalientes
8:10pm	Íñiguez 74'	Report		Referee: Jorge Eduardo Gasso

March 5, 2011 Round 9	Cruz Azul	0 – 0	Necaxa	Estadio Azul, Mexico City
5:00pm		Report		Referee: Paul Delgadillo

March 11, 2011 Round 10	Necaxa	0 – 1	Monterrey	Estadio Victoria, Aguascalientes
8:10pm		Report	de Nigris 46'	Referee: Marco Antonio Rodríguez

March 20, 2011 Round 11	Puebla	1 – 0	Necaxa	Estadio Cuauhtémoc, Puebla
12:00pm	Corona 80'	Report		Referee: Erim Ramírez

April 1, 2011 Round 12	Necaxa	1 – 2	Guadalajara	Estadio Victoria, Aguascalientes
8:10pm	Blanco 6'	Report	Báez 2'; Fabián 70'	Referee: Mauricio Morales

April 9, 2011 Round 13	San Luis	0 – 0	Necaxa	Estadio Alfonso Lastras, San Luis Potosí
8:45pm		Report		Referee: Juan Genaro Medrano

April 13, 2011 Round 14	Necaxa	2 – 2	Estudiantes Tecos	Estadio Victoria, Aguascalientes
7:00pm	Quatrocchi 26'; Suárez 66' (pen.)	Report	López 76'; Lillingston 89'	Referee: Paul Delgadillo

April 16, 2011 Round 15	Atlante	1 – 1	Necaxa	Estadio Quintana Roo, Cancún
9:00pm	Bermúdez 75' (pen.)	Report	Ledesma 20'	Referee: Miguel Ángel Ortega

April 22, 2011 Round 16	Necaxa	0 – 1	UNAM	Estadio Victoria, Aguascalientes
8:10pm		Report	Cacho 86'	Referee: Francisco Chacón

April 30, 2011 Round 17	Pachuca	1 – 1	Necaxa	Estadio Hidalgo, Pachuca
7:00pm	Anchico 15'	Report	Íñiguez 62'	Referee: Marco Antonio Rodríguez

=== Goalscorers ===
Position	Nation	Name	Goals scored
1	(Ecuador)	Cristian Suárez	3
1	(Mexico)	Ismael Íñiguez	3
3	(Uruguay)	Sergio Blanco	2
4	(Argentina)	Arturo Ledesma	1
4	(Argentina)	Pablo Quatrocchi	1
TOTAL			10

=== Results ===
==== Results summary ====
Overall								Home						Away					
Pld	W	D	L	GF	GA	GD	Pts	W	D	L	GF	GA	GD	W	D	L	GF	GA	GD
17	3	6	8	10	15	−5	15	2	2	5	5	8	−3	1	4	3	5	7	−2

Last updated: 6 May 2011.
Source: Clausura 2011 results

==== Results by round ====
Round	1	2	3	4	5	6	7	8	9	10	11	12	13	14	15	16	17
Ground	H	A	H	A	H	H	A	H	A	H	A	H	A	H	A	H	A
Result	L	L	L	L	D	W	W	W	D	L	L	L	D	D	D	L	D
Position	14	17	18	18	18	15	14	12	11	13	14	17	17	17	17	17	17

Updated to match(es) played on 6 May 2011. Source: Clausura 2011 results and mediotiempo.com
A = Away; H = Home; W = Win; D = Draw; L = Loss
