= Liga de Ascenso Bicentenario 2010 Liguilla =

The Liguilla will have the teams play two games against each other on a home-and-away basis. The winner of each match up will be determined by aggregate score. The higher seeded team will advance if the aggregate is a tie. The exception for tie-breaking procedure is the finals, where the higher seeded team rule will not be used. If the teams remained tied after 90 minutes of play during the 2nd leg of the finals, extra time will be used, followed by a penalty shootout if necessary. The teams will be seeded 2 to 7 (depending on their position at the end of the regular season). Higher seeded teams play on their home field during the second leg.

Kickoffs are given in local time.

== Bracket ==
Quarterfinals
4	Pumas Morelos	0	1	1
5	La Piedad	0	2	2
2	Necaxa	0	2	2
7	BUAP	0	0	0
3	Tijuana	2	1	3
6	Correcaminos	1	1	2

Semifinals
1	León	2	5	7
5	La Piedad	0	0	0
2	Necaxa	0	5	5
3	Tijuana	0	2	2

Finals
1	León	0	2	2
2	Necaxa	3	1	4

== Quarter-finals ==
The quarterfinals are scheduled to be played on.

Team 1	Agg.	Team 2	1st leg	2nd leg
Necaxa (Mexico)	2 – 0	(Mexico) BUAP	0 – 0	2 – 0
Tijuana (Mexico)	3 – 1	(Mexico) UAT	1 – 1	2 – 0
Pumas Morelos (Mexico)	1 – 2	(Mexico) La Piedad	0 – 0	1 – 2

1. Advanced by best position on the general table.

=== First leg ===
2010-04-21
16:00

La Piedad	0 – 0	Pumas Morelos

Estadio Juan N. López
La Piedad, Michoacán
Referee: Oscar Macias Romo (Mexico)

2010-04-21
20:00

BUAP	0 – 0	Necaxa

Estadio Cuauhtémoc
Puebla, Puebla
Referee: Juan Gerónimo Cruz Rivera (Mexico)

2010-04-22
20:30

UAT	1 – 2	Tijuana
Orrego 54'		Enríquez 1'; Gerk 46'

Estadio Marte R. Gómez
Ciudad Victoria, Tamaulipas
Referee: Cesar Esteban Moreno Roa (Mexico)

=== Second leg ===
2010-04-24
16:00

Pumas Morelos	1 – 2	La Piedad
Bonells 85'		Rodríguez 42', 82'

Estadio Centenario
Cuernavaca, Morelos
Referee: Jorge Isaac Rojas Castillo (Mexico)

2010-04-24
19:00

Necaxa	2 – 0	BUAP
Barbosa 44'; Maz 89'

Estadio Victoria
Aguascalientes, Aguascalientes
Referee: Gerardo García Acevedo (Mexico)

2010-04-25
13:00

Tijuana	1 – 1	UAT
Lillingston 43'		Pizano 55' (o.g.)

Estadio Caliente
Tijuana, Baja California
Referee: Antony Zanjuampa Rojo (Mexico)

== Semi-finals ==
The semifinals are scheduled to be played on.

Team 1	Agg.	Team 2	1st leg	2nd leg
León (Mexico)	7 – 0	(Mexico) La Piedad	2 – 0	5 – 0
Necaxa (Mexico)	5 – 2	(Mexico) Tijuana	0 – 0	5 – 2

=== First leg ===
2010-04-28
15:00

La Piedad	0 – 2	León
		Figoli 45'; Orozco 65'

Estadio Juan N. López
La Piedad, Michoacán
Referee: Fernando Guerrero Ramírez (Mexico)

2010-04-28
15:00

Tijuana	0 – 0	Necaxa

Estadio Caliente
Tijuana, Baja California
Referee: Victor Bisguerra Mendiola (Mexico)

=== Second leg ===
2010-05-01
18:00

Necaxa	5 – 2	Tijuana
Maz 23', 48', 68', 84', 85'		Enríquez 41'; Malrrechaufe 81'

Estadio Victoria
Aguascalientes, Aguascalientes
Referee: Mairo Alonso Villa García (Mexico)

2010-05-01
20:00

León	5 – 0	La Piedad
Casartelli 2', 39'; Ceja 10', 87'; Nieves 81'

Estadio Nou Camp
León, Guanajuato
Referee: José Roberto Méndez León (Mexico)

== Final ==
The first and second legs of the final are scheduled to be played on .

Team 1	Agg.	Team 2	1st leg	2nd leg
León (Mexico)	2 – 4	(Mexico) Necaxa	0 – 3	2 – 1

=== First leg ===
2010-05-05
18:00

Necaxa	3 – 0	León
Chávez 29'; Romero 38'; Mosqueda 90+2'

Estadio Victoria
Aguascalientes, Aguascalientes
Referee: Mario Alonso Villa García (Mexico)

=== Second leg ===
2010-05-08
20:00

León	2 – 1	Necaxa
Corona 50'; Valadéz 71'		Maz 54'

Estadio Nou Camp
León, Guanajuato
Referee: Fernando Guerrero Ramírez (Mexico)

Necaxa won the Liga De Ascenso on a 4-2 aggregate score line

== Apertura Champion ==
Bicentenario 2010 winner:
Necaxa
2nd Title

== Goalscorers ==
3 goals

- (Mexico) Ariel González
- (Mexico) Alejandro Castillo

2 goals

- (Uruguay) Álvaro Fabián González (BUAP)

1 goal

- (Uruguay) Nelson Sebastián Maz (Necaxa)
- (Mexico) Alejandro Castro (Cruz Azul Hidalgo)
- (Mexico) Raymundo Torres Rangel (Sinaloa)
- (Mexico) Luis Ángel García (Veracruz)
- (Mexico) Iván Vázquez (Necaxa)
- (Mexico) Juan Augusto Gómez (BUAP)
- (Mexico) Paulo Chávez (Necaxa)
