= 2007–08 Primera División A season =

Season of a Mexican football league

Primera División A
- Season: 2007–08
- Champions: Apertura: Indios; Clausura: León
- Promoted: Indios
- Relegated: Tijuana

== Changes for the 2007–08 season ==
- Querétaro were relegated from Liga MX
- Puebla were promoted to Liga MX

Added Teams

- Coatzacoalcos
- Real Colima
- Tapatio
- Salamanca
- Tapachula
- Socio Aguila (Clausura 2007)

Dropped Teams

- La Piedad
- Veracruz B (Apertura 2006)
- Guerreros
- U de G
- Tabasco (Apertura 2006)
- Zacatepec (Apertura 2006)
- Celaya (Clausura 2007)
- Orizaba (Clausura 2007)

== Stadium and locations ==
| Club | Stadium | Capacity | City |
|---|---|---|---|
| Académicos | Unidad Deportiva Revolución Mexicana | 5,000 | Tonalá |
| Atlético Mexiquense | Ixtapan 90 | 4,000 | Toluca |
| Coatzacoalcos | Rafael Hernández Ochoa | 6,000 | Coatzacoalcos |
| Correcaminos | Marte R. Gómez | 19,500 | Ciudad Victoria |
| Cruz Azul Hidalgo | 10 de Diciembre | 17,000 | Mexico City |
| Dorados de Sinaloa | Banorte | 21,000 | Culiacán |
| Durango | Francisco Zarco | 18,000 | Durango |
| Indios | Olímpico Benito Juárez | 22,000 | Ciudad Juárez |
| Jaguares de Tapachula | Víctor Manuel Reyna | 17,000 | Tapachula |
| León | Nou Camp | 33,943 | León |
| Lobos BUAP | Cuauhtémoc | 46,912 | Puebla |
| Monarcas Morelia A | Morelos | 39,000 | Morelia |
| Pumas Morelos | Centenario | 15,237 | Cuernavaca |
| Querétaro | Corregidora | 33,000 | Querétaro City |
| Rayados A | El Barrial | 1,000 | Monterrey |
| Real Colima | Colima | 12,000 | Colima |
| Salamanca | Estadio Sección XXIV | 12,000 | Salamanca |
| Santos Laguna A | Corona | 19,000 | Torreón |
| Socio Águila | Azteca | 105,000 | Mexico City |
| Tampico Madero | Tamaulipas | 20,000 | Tampico - Ciudad Madero |
| Tapatío | Jalisco | 65,000 | Guadalajara |
| Tecos A | Tres de Marzo | 25,000 | Zapopan |
| Tigres B | Adolfo López Mateos | 10,000 | Reynosa |
| Tijuana | Caliente | 33,333 | Tijuana |

== Apertura 2007 ==
Primera División A
- Season: Apertura 2007
- Champions: Indios

=== Tournament Format ===
==== Promotion ====
One team is promoted to the Primera División each year (two short tournaments). After the Clausura 2008 tournament, the champions of the Apertura 2007 and Clausura 2008 tournaments will play a home and home series to determine which team will be promoted. If the same team wins both tournaments it will be promoted automatically. In order for a team to be promoted it has to obtain a certification from the Federación Mexicana de Fútbol Asociación. If the winner of the promotional final is not certified for promotion a home and home series is played between the highest placed certified team and the club being relegated to the Primera División A to determine which will be in the Primera División.

==== Relegation ====
One team is relegated to the Segunda División each year (two short tournaments). The team that has the worst points to games played ratio over the previous three years (Apertura 2005, Clausura 2006, Apertura 2006, Clausura 2007, Apertura 2007, Clausura 2008) is relegated to the Segunda División.

=== General league table ===
| Pos | Team | Pld | W | D | L | GF | GA | GD | Pts | Qualification |
|---|---|---|---|---|---|---|---|---|---|---|
| 1 | León | 17 | 12 | 4 | 1 | 35 | 16 | +19 | 40 | Qualifies for the Liguilla |
| 2 | Correcaminos | 17 | 11 | 3 | 3 | 24 | 14 | +10 | 36 | Qualifies for the Liguilla |
| 3 | Dorados de Sinaloa | 17 | 10 | 5 | 2 | 36 | 18 | +18 | 35 | Qualifies for the Liguilla |
| 4 | Lobos BUAP | 17 | 9 | 3 | 5 | 24 | 19 | +5 | 30 | Qualifies for the Liguilla |
| 5 | Indios | 17 | 9 | 3 | 5 | 26 | 22 | +4 | 30 | Qualifies for the Liguilla |
| 6 | Académicos | 17 | 8 | 5 | 4 | 20 | 14 | +6 | 29 | Qualifies for the Liguilla |
| 7 | Atlético Mexiquense | 17 | 8 | 3 | 6 | 29 | 21 | +8 | 27 | Qualifies for the Liguilla |
| 8 | Monterrey A | 17 | 6 | 7 | 4 | 18 | 16 | +2 | 25 | |
| 9 | Cruz Azul Hidalgo | 17 | 6 | 7 | 4 | 20 | 20 | 0 | 25 | Last on the relegation table |
| 10 | Tijuana | 17 | 7 | 3 | 7 | 22 | 22 | 0 | 24 | Qualifies for the Liguilla |
| 11 | Tampico Madero | 17 | 7 | 2 | 8 | 35 | 29 | +6 | 23 | |
| 12 | Querétaro | 17 | 5 | 8 | 4 | 32 | 27 | +5 | 23 | |
| 13 | TR Coatzacoalcos | 17 | 6 | 5 | 6 | 21 | 24 | −3 | 23 | |
| 14 | Real Colima | 17 | 6 | 4 | 7 | 19 | 26 | −7 | 22 | |
| 15 | Tapatío | 17 | 6 | 4 | 7 | 28 | 29 | −1 | 22 | |
| 16 | Tigres B | 17 | 4 | 7 | 6 | 16 | 21 | −5 | 19 | |
| 17 | Tecos A | 17 | 4 | 5 | 8 | 19 | 21 | −2 | 17 | |
| 18 | Monarcas Morelia A | 17 | 3 | 8 | 6 | 24 | 27 | −3 | 17 | |
| 19 | Salamanca | 17 | 4 | 5 | 8 | 22 | 31 | −9 | 17 | |
| 20 | Durango | 17 | 4 | 4 | 9 | 18 | 27 | −9 | 16 | |
| 21 | Tapachula | 17 | 4 | 4 | 9 | 17 | 29 | −12 | 16 | |
| 22 | Santos Laguna A | 17 | 3 | 6 | 8 | 21 | 30 | −9 | 15 | |
| 23 | Pumas Morelos | 17 | 2 | 8 | 7 | 16 | 22 | −6 | 14 | |
| 24 | Socio Águila | 17 | 1 | 5 | 11 | 16 | 35 | −19 | 8 | |

Source: FMF
Rules for classification: 1st points; 2nd goal difference; 3rd goals scored; 4th head-to-head; 5th away goals scored; 6th draw

=== Liguilla ===
Quarterfinals
1 | León | 1 | 3 | 4
8 | Tijuana | 0 | 0 | 0
5 | Lobos BUAP | 1 | 2 | 3
4 | Indios | 2 | 2 | 4
3 | Dorados de Sinaloa | 1 | 3 | 4
6 | Académicos | 1 | 0 | 1
7 | Correcaminos | 0 | 1 | 1
2 | Atlético Mexiquense | 0 | 1 | 1

Semifinals
1 | León | 0 | 1 | 1
4 | Indios | 1 | 1 | 2
3 | Dorados de Sinaloa | 1 | 0 | 1
2 | Correcaminos | 0 | 0 | 0

Finals
1 | Dorados de Sinaloa | 0 | 0 | 0
2 | Indios | 3 | 4 | 7

==== Quarter-finals ====
| Team 1 | Agg. | Team 2 | 1st leg | 2nd leg |
|---|---|---|---|---|
| León | 4–0 | Tijuana | 1–0 | 3–0 |
| Lobos BUAP | 3–4 | Indios | 1–2 | 2–2 |
| Dorados de Sinaloa | 4–1 | Académicos | 1–1 | 3–0 |
| Correcaminos (s) | 1–1 | Atlético Mexiquense | 0–0 | 1–1 |

===== First leg =====
| 28 November 2007 | Atlético Mexiquense | 0–0 | UAT | Ixtapan de la Sal |
| 15:00 | | Report | | Stadium: Estadio Ixtapan 90; Referee: Ricardo Arellano Nieves |

| 28 November 2007 | Académicos | 1–1 | Dorados | Tonalá |
| 15:00 | Santos 56' | Report | Silva 85' | Stadium: Estadio Revolución Mexicana; Referee: Juan Genaro Medrano Avalos |

| 29 November 2007 | Tijuana | 0–1 | León | Tijuana |
| 14:00 | | Report | Bareiro 50' | Stadium: Estadio Caliente; Referee: Hugo León Guajardo |

| 29 November 2007 | Indios | 2–1 | Lobos BUAP | Ciudad Juárez |
| 18:00 | Frías 39'; Orozco 43' (own) | Report | López 24' | Stadium: Estadio Olímpico Benito Juárez; Referee: Román Rafael Medina Vázquez |

===== Second leg =====
| 1 December 2007 | Dorados | 3–0 (4–1 agg.) | Académicos | Culiacán |
| 19:00 | Silva 28'; Padilla 44'; Pinto 57' | Report | | Stadium: Estadio Banorte; Referee: Manuel Ernesto Glower Guerra |

| 1 December 2007 | Correcaminos | 1–1 (1–1 agg.) | Atlético Mexiquense | Ciudad Victoria |
| 20:00 | Ayala 35' | Report | García 68' | Stadium: Estadio Marte R. Gómez; Referee: Miguel Ángel Ortega Rojas |

| 2 December 2007 | León | 3–0 (4–0 agg.) | Tijuana | León |
| 12:00 | Torres 10'; Romero 25', 61' | Report | | Stadium: Estadio León; Referee: José Alfredo Peñaloza Soto |

| 2 December 2007 | Lobos BUAP | 2–2 (3–4 agg.) | Indios | Puebla |
| 12:00 | Cercado 22'; Hernández 59' | Report | Maz 36'; Gómez 37' | Stadium: Estadio Cuauhtémoc; Referee: Jesús Fabricio Morales Bojorquez |

==== Semi-finals ====
| Team 1 | Agg. | Team 2 | 1st leg | 2nd leg |
|---|---|---|---|---|
| León | 1–2 | Indios | 0–1 | 1–1 |
| Dorados | 1–0 | Correcaminos | 1–0 | 0–0 |

===== First leg =====
| 5 December 2007 | Dorados | 1–0 | Correcaminos | Culiacán |
| 20:30 | Gaytán 85' | Report | | Stadium: Estadio Banorte; Referee: Manuel Ernesto Glower Guerra |

| 6 December 2007 | Indios | 1–0 | León | Ciudad Juárez |
| 19:00 | Frías 35' | Report | | Stadium: Estadio Olímpico Benito Juárez; Referee: Adolfo Aquino Benítez |

===== Second leg =====
| 8 December 2007 | Correcaminos | 0–0 (0–1 agg.) | Dorados | Ciudad Victoria |
| 20:00 | | Report | | Stadium: Estadio Marte R. Gómez; Referee: Hugo León Guajardo |

| 9 December 2007 | León | 1–1 (1–2 agg.) | Indios | León |
| 12:00 | Romero 38' | Report | Santibáñez 23' | Stadium: Estadio León; Referee: José Abramo Lira |

==== Final ====
| Team 1 | Agg. | Team 2 | 1st leg | 2nd leg |
|---|---|---|---|---|
| Dorados | 0–7 | Indios | 0–3 | 0–4 |

===== First leg =====
| 12 December 2007 | Indios | 3–0 | Dorados | Ciudad Juárez |
| 19:00 | Frías 8'; González 12' (own); Maz 55' | Report | | Stadium: Estadio Olímpico Benito Juárez; Referee: Hugo León Guajardo |

===== Second leg =====
| 15 December 2007 | Dorados | 0–4 (0–7 agg.) | Indios | Culiacán |
| 19:00 | | Report | Maz 6', 87'; Martínez 61'; Santibáñez 72' | Stadium: Estadio Banorte; Referee: Roberto García Orozco |

Apertura 2007 winner

1st title

== Clausura 2008 ==
Primera División A
- Season: Clausura 2008
- Champions: León
- Matches: 221
- Goals: 552 (2.5 per match)
- Biggest home win: Indios 5–0 Monarcas Morelia A (March 22)
- Biggest away win: Tapachula 0–5 León (March 30)
- Highest scoring: Socio Águila 2–6 León (April 11)
- Longest winning run: León; Sinaloa (3 Games)
- Longest losing run: Socio Águila (5 Games)

Primera División A (Méxican First A Division) Clausura 2008 is a Méxican football tournament – one of two tournaments held in one year. It began Friday, January 11, 2008. Reigning champions Indios could not defend their title, as León won their 3rd title in Primera División A, and earned the right to battle Indios in a two-leg aggregate to try to earn promotion to the Primera División de México.

=== Group league tables ===
==== Group 1 ====
| Pos | Team | Pld | W | D | L | GF | GA | GD | Pts | Qualification |
|---|---|---|---|---|---|---|---|---|---|---|
| 1 | Dorados de Sinaloa | 17 | 10 | 5 | 2 | 31 | 14 | +17 | 35 | Qualifies for the Liguilla |
| 2 | León | 17 | 9 | 6 | 2 | 45 | 23 | +22 | 33 | Qualifies for the Liguilla |
| 3 | Durango | 17 | 9 | 4 | 4 | 28 | 23 | +5 | 31 | Qualifies for the Liguilla |
| 4 | Tijuana | 17 | 8 | 3 | 6 | 23 | 16 | +7 | 27 | Last on the relegation table |
| 5 | Salamanca | 17 | 7 | 3 | 7 | 21 | 23 | −2 | 24 | Qualifies for the Liguilla |
| 6 | Tecos | 17 | 6 | 4 | 7 | 17 | 21 | −4 | 22 | |
| 7 | Tapatío | 17 | 6 | 3 | 8 | 14 | 21 | −7 | 21 | |
| 8 | Monarcas Morelia A | 17 | 4 | 6 | 7 | 21 | 25 | −4 | 18 | |
| 9 | Querétaro | 17 | 4 | 6 | 7 | 23 | 30 | −7 | 18 | |
| 10 | Real Colima | 17 | 4 | 5 | 8 | 19 | 26 | −7 | 17 | |
| 11 | Académicos | 17 | 4 | 4 | 9 | 18 | 27 | −9 | 16 | |
| 12 | Santos Laguna A | 17 | 3 | 3 | 11 | 16 | 31 | −15 | 12 | |

Source: FMF
Rules for classification: 1st points; 2nd goal difference; 3rd goals scored; 4th head-to-head; 5th away goals scored; 6th draw

==== Group 2 ====
| Pos | Team | Pld | W | D | L | GF | GA | GD | Pts | Qualification |
|---|---|---|---|---|---|---|---|---|---|---|
| 1 | TR Coatzacoalcos | 17 | 8 | 6 | 3 | 21 | 18 | +3 | 30 | Qualifies for the Liguilla |
| 2 | Tampico Madero | 17 | 8 | 5 | 4 | 23 | 23 | 0 | 29 | Qualifies for the Liguilla |
| 3 | Tigres B | 17 | 7 | 7 | 3 | 22 | 15 | +7 | 28 | Qualifies for the Liguilla |
| 4 | Cruz Azul Hidalgo | 17 | 8 | 4 | 5 | 21 | 15 | +6 | 28 | Qualifies for the Liguilla |
| 5 | Indios | 17 | 6 | 8 | 3 | 27 | 14 | +13 | 26 | |
| 6 | Lobos BUAP | 17 | 7 | 4 | 6 | 22 | 16 | +6 | 25 | |
| 7 | Pumas Morelos | 17 | 7 | 4 | 6 | 23 | 26 | −3 | 25 | |
| 8 | Atlético Mexiquense | 17 | 6 | 5 | 6 | 17 | 16 | +1 | 23 | |
| 9 | Correcaminos | 17 | 5 | 6 | 6 | 23 | 17 | +6 | 21 | |
| 10 | Monterrey A | 17 | 4 | 6 | 7 | 23 | 28 | −5 | 18 | |
| 11 | Socio Águila | 17 | 5 | 2 | 10 | 14 | 26 | −12 | 17 | |
| 12 | Tapachula | 17 | 3 | 3 | 11 | 14 | 32 | −18 | 12 | |

Source: FMF
Rules for classification: 1st points; 2nd goal difference; 3rd goals scored; 4th head-to-head; 5th away goals scored; 6th draw

=== General league table ===
| Pos | Team | Pld | W | D | L | GF | GA | GD | Pts | Qualification |
|---|---|---|---|---|---|---|---|---|---|---|
| 1 | Dorados de Sinaloa | 17 | 10 | 5 | 2 | 31 | 14 | +17 | 35 | Qualifies for the Liguilla |
| 2 | León | 17 | 9 | 6 | 2 | 45 | 23 | +22 | 33 | Qualifies for the Liguilla |
| 3 | Durango | 17 | 9 | 4 | 4 | 28 | 23 | +5 | 31 | Qualifies for the Liguilla |
| 4 | TR Coatzacoalcos | 17 | 8 | 6 | 3 | 21 | 18 | +3 | 30 | Qualifies for the Liguilla |
| 5 | Tampico Madero | 17 | 8 | 5 | 4 | 23 | 23 | 0 | 29 | Qualifies for the Liguilla |
| 6 | Tigres B | 17 | 7 | 7 | 3 | 22 | 15 | +7 | 28 | Qualifies for the Liguilla |
| 7 | Cruz Azul Hidalgo | 17 | 8 | 4 | 5 | 21 | 15 | +6 | 28 | Qualifies for the Liguilla |
| 8 | Tijuana | 17 | 8 | 3 | 6 | 23 | 16 | +7 | 27 | Last on the relegation table |
| 9 | Indios | 17 | 6 | 8 | 3 | 27 | 14 | +13 | 26 | |
| 10 | Lobos BUAP | 17 | 7 | 4 | 6 | 22 | 16 | +6 | 25 | |
| 11 | Pumas Morelos | 17 | 7 | 4 | 6 | 23 | 26 | −3 | 25 | |
| 12 | Salamanca | 17 | 7 | 3 | 7 | 21 | 23 | −2 | 24 | Qualifies for the Liguilla |
| 13 | Atlético Mexiquense | 17 | 6 | 5 | 6 | 17 | 16 | +1 | 23 | |
| 14 | Tecos A | 17 | 6 | 4 | 7 | 17 | 21 | −4 | 22 | |
| 15 | Correcaminos | 17 | 5 | 6 | 6 | 23 | 17 | +6 | 21 | |
| 16 | Tapatío | 17 | 6 | 3 | 8 | 14 | 21 | −7 | 21 | |
| 17 | Monarcas Morelia A | 17 | 4 | 6 | 7 | 21 | 25 | −4 | 18 | |
| 18 | Monterrey A | 17 | 4 | 6 | 7 | 23 | 28 | −5 | 18 | |
| 19 | Querétaro | 17 | 4 | 6 | 7 | 23 | 30 | −7 | 18 | |
| 20 | Real Colima | 17 | 4 | 5 | 8 | 19 | 26 | −7 | 17 | |
| 21 | Socio Águila | 17 | 5 | 2 | 10 | 14 | 26 | −12 | 17 | |
| 22 | Académicos | 17 | 4 | 4 | 9 | 18 | 27 | −9 | 16 | |
| 23 | Santos Laguna A | 17 | 3 | 3 | 11 | 16 | 31 | −15 | 12 | |
| 24 | Tapachula | 17 | 3 | 3 | 11 | 14 | 32 | −18 | 12 | |

Source: FMF
Rules for classification: 1st points; 2nd goal difference; 3rd goals scored; 4th head-to-head; 5th away goals scored; 6th draw

=== Liguilla ===
Quarterfinals
1 | Dorados de Sinaloa | 0 | 1 | 1
8 | Salamanca | 0 | 1 | 1
5 | Coatzacoalcos | 1 | 4 | 5
4 | Tampico Madero | 0 | 2 | 2
3 | Durango | 0 | 0 | 0
6 | Tigres B | 0 | 0 | 0
7 | León | 2 | 1 | 3
2 | Cruz Azul Hidalgo | 0 | 1 | 1

Semifinals
1 | Dorados de Sinaloa | 0 | 1 | 1
4 | Coatzacoalcos | 0 | 0 | 0
3 | Durango | 0 | 2 | 2
2 | León | 0 | 3 | 3

Finals
1 | Dorados de Sinaloa | 2 | 0 | 2
2 | León | 2 | 1 | 3

==== Quarter-finals ====
| Team 1 | Agg. | Team 2 | 1st leg | 2nd leg |
|---|---|---|---|---|
| Dorados (s.) | 1–1 | Salamanca | 0–0 | 1–1 |
| Coatzacoalcos | 5–2 | Tampico Madero | 1–0 | 4–2 |
| León | 3–1 | Cruz Azul Hidalgo | 2–0 | 1–1 |
| Durango (s.) | 0–0 | Tigres B | 0–0 | 0–0 |

===== First leg =====
| 30 April 2008 | Salamanca | 0–0 | Dorados | Salamanca |
| 17:00 | | Report | | Stadium: Estadio Sección XXIV; Attendance: 8,000; Referee: Miguel Angel Solano González |

| 30 April 2008 | Tigres B | 0–0 | Durango | Reynosa |
| 17:45 | | Report | | Stadium: Estadio Adolfo López Mateos; Attendance: 2,500; Referee: Antonio Guillermo Ojeda Moreno |

| 30 April 2008 | Tampico Madero | 0–1 | Coatzacoalcos | Tampico - Ciudad Madero |
| 21:00 | | Report | Domínguez 29' | Stadium: Estadio Tamaulipas; Attendance: 18,000; Referee: Jorge Macías Romo |

| 1 May 2008 | Cruz Azul Hidalgo | 0–2 | León | Ciudad Cooperativa Cruz Azul |
| 17:00 | | Report | Bareiro 77'; Romero 89' | Stadium: Estadio 10 de Diciembre; Attendance: 7,000; Referee: Julio David Escobar Barba |

===== Second leg =====
| 3 May 2008 | Durango | 0–0 (0–0 agg.) | Tigres B | Durango City |
| 15:30 | | Report | | Stadium: Estadio Francisco Zarco; Attendance: 12,500; Referee: Román Rafael Medina Vázquez |

| 3 May 2008 | Coatzacoalcos | 4–2 (5–2 agg.) | Tampico Madero | Coatzacoalcos |
| 17:00 | Mancilla 5', 17'; Arvizu 74'; Flores 85' | Report | Pardini 24', 52' | Stadium: Estadio Rafael Hernández Ochoa; Attendance: 6,000; Referee: Ricardo Arellano Nieves |

| 3 May 2008 | Dorados | 1–1 (1–1 agg.) | Salamanca | Culiacán |
| 19:00 | Padilla 25' | Report | Manrique 54' | Stadium: Estadio Banorte; Attendance: 15,000; Referee: Miguel Ángel Ortega Rojas |

| 4 May 2008 | León | 1–1 (3–1 agg.) | Cruz Azul Hidalgo | León3 |
| 12:00 | Almirón 66' | Report | Orozco 23' | Stadium: Estadio León; Attendance: 27,000; Referee: Miguel Ángel Chacón Viveros |

==== Semi-finals ====
| Team 1 | Agg. | Team 2 | 1st leg | 2nd leg |
|---|---|---|---|---|
| Dorados | 1–0 | Coatzacoalcos | 0–0 | 1–0 |
| León | 3–2 | Durango | 0–0 | 3–2 |

===== First leg =====
| 7 May 2008 | Coatzacoalcos | 0–0 | Dorados | Coatzacoalcos |
| 17:00 | | Report | | Stadium: Estadio Rafael Hernández Ochoa; Attendance: 6,000; Referee: Julio David Escobar Barba |

| 8 May 2008 | Durango | 0–0 | León | Durango City |
| 15:30 | | Report | | Stadium: Estadio Francisco Zarco; Attendance: 13,250; Referee: Jorge Macías Romo |

===== Second leg =====
| 10 May 2008 | Dorados | 1–0 (1–0 agg.) | Coatzacoalcos | Culiacán |
| 19:00 | Gerk 73' | Report | | Stadium: Estadio Banorte; Attendance: 12,000; Referee: José Alfredo Peñaloza Soto |

| 11 May 2008 | León | 3–2 (3–2 agg.) | Durango | León |
| 12:00 | Borboa 12'; Rojas 14'; Almirón 41' | Report | Calderón 15'; Silva 46' | Stadium: Estadio León; Attendance: 33,000; Referee: Jaime Herrera Garduño |

==== Final ====
| Team 1 | Agg. | Team 2 | 1st leg | 2nd leg |
|---|---|---|---|---|
| Dorados | 2–3 | León | 2–2 | 0–1 |

===== First leg =====
| 14 May 2008 | León | 2–2 | Dorados | León |
| 20:00 | Bareiro 49'; Romero 50' | Report | Polo 25'; Henríquez 29' | Stadium: Estadio León; Attendance: 33,000; Referee: Roberto García Orozco |

===== Second leg =====
| 17 May 2008 | Dorados | 0–1 (2–3 agg.) | León | Culiacán |
| 19:00 | | Report | Bareiro 74' | Stadium: Estadio Banorte; Attendance: 21,000; Referee: Marco Antonio Rodríguez |

Clausura 2008 winner

3rd title

== Campeón de Ascenso 2008 ==
=== First leg ===
May 22, 2008
19:00

| Indios | 1–0 | León |
|---|---|---|
| Carlos Casartelli 76' |

Estadio Olímpico Benito Juárez, Ciudad Juárez
Referee: Hugo León Guajardo

=== Second leg ===
May 25, 2008
12:00

| León | 2-2 | Indios |
|---|---|---|
| David Quiñones 21'; Héctor Gómez 84' | | David Stringel 59'; Nelson Sebastián Maz 73' |

Estadio León, León, Guanajuato
Referee:

Champions

1st title

== Top scorers ==
| Scorer | Goals | Team |
|---|---|---|
| (Paraguay) Fredy Bareiro | 17 | León |
| (Mexico) Víctor Lojero | 15 | Tampico Madero |
| (Mexico) Martín Calderón | 12 | Durango |
| (Mexico) Julio Frías | 8 | Indios |
| (Mexico) Pedro Solís | 8 | Correcaminos |
| (Mexico) Alejandro Molina | 8 | Monterrey A |
| (Mexico) Javier Orozco | 8 | Cruz Azul Hidalgo |
| (Uruguay) Nelson Maz | 8 | Indios |
| (Mexico) Miguel Casanova | 7 | Tapachula |
| (Mexico) Mauricio Romero | 7 | León |
| (Mexico) Bardo Fierros | 7 | Dorados de Sinaloa |
| (Mexico) Roberto Nurse | 7 | Querétaro |
| (Mexico) Samuel Ochoa | 7 | Tecos A |
| (Mexico) Eduardo García | 7 | Académicos |
| (Mexico) Jair García | 6 | Cruz Azul Hidalgo |

Last updated: May 3, 2008
Source: FMF
