= Liga de Ascenso Apertura 2009 Liguilla =

The Liguilla will have the teams play two games against each other on a home-and-away basis. The winner of each match up will be determined by aggregate score. The higher seeded team will advance if the aggregate is a tie. The exception for tie-breaking procedure is the finals, where the higher seeded team rule will not be used. If the teams remained tied after 90 minutes of play during the 2nd leg of the finals, extra time will be used, followed by a penalty shootout if necessary. The teams will be seeded 2 to 7 (depending on their position at the end of the regular season). Higher seeded teams play on their home field during the second leg.

Kickoffs are given in local time.

== Bracket ==
Quarterfinals
4	Veracruz	0	1	1
5	Dorados de Sinaloa	1	0	1
2	Lobos BUAP	2	1	3
7	Potros Neza	1	0	1
3	Necaxa	1	2	3
6	Cruz Azul Hidalgo	1	0	1

Semifinals
1	Irapuato	0	3	3
4	Veracruz	1	0	1
2	Lobos BUAP	0	0	0
3	Necaxa	2	0	2

Finals
1	Irapuato	0	3	3
3	Necaxa	1	3	4

== Quarter-finals ==
The quarterfinals are scheduled to be played on.

Team 1	Agg.	Team 2	1st leg	2nd leg
BUAP (Mexico)	3 – 1	(Mexico) Potros Neza	2 – 1	1 – 0
Necaxa (Mexico)	3 – 1	(Mexico) Cruz Azul Hidalgo	1 – 1	2 – 0
Veracruz^{1} (Mexico)	1 – 1	(Mexico) Sinaloa	0 – 1	1 – 0

1. Advanced by best position on the general table.

=== First leg ===
2009-11-25
15:00

Cruz Azul Hidalgo	1 – 1	Necaxa
Castro 46'		Vázquez 84'

Estadio 10 de Diciembre
Jasso, Hidalgo
Referee: José Roberto Méndez León (Mexico)

2009-11-25
20:00

Sinaloa	1 – 0	Veracruz
Torres 77'

Estadio Banorte
Culiacán, Sinaloa
Referee: Osvaldo Sánchez Huerta (Mexico)

2009-11-26
15:00

Potros Neza	1 – 2	BUAP
Cáceres 80' (o.g.)		González 10', 82'

Estadio Neza 86
Nezahualcóyotl, State of Mexico
Referee: Mario Alonso Villa García (Mexico)

=== Second leg ===
2009-11-28
17:00

Necaxa	2 – 0	Cruz Azul Hidalgo
Chávez 54'; Maz 86'

Estadio Victoria
Aguascalientes, Aguascalientes
Referee: Israel Parea Vazquez (Mexico)

2009-11-28
19:00

Veracruz	1 – 0	Sinaloa
García 90+4'

Estadio Luis de la Fuente
Veracruz, Veracruz
Referee: Fernando Guerrero Ramírez (Mexico)

2009-11-29
12:00

BUAP	1 – 0	Potros Neza
Gómez 57'

Estadio Cuauhtémoc
Puebla, Puebla
Referee: Jorge Isaac Rojas Castillo (Mexico)

== Semi-finals ==
The semifinals are scheduled to be played on.

Team 1	Agg.	Team 2	1st leg	2nd leg
Irapuato (Mexico)	3 – 1	(Mexico) Veracruz	0 – 1	3 – 0
BUAP (Mexico)	0 – 2	(Mexico) Necaxa	0 – 2	0 – 0

=== First leg ===
2009-12-02
20:45

Veracruz	1 – 0	Irapuato
Aílton 90+1'

Estadio Luis de la Fuente
Veracruz, Veracruz
Referee: Jorge Isaac Rojas Castillo (Mexico)

2009-12-03
17:00

Necaxa	2 – 0	BUAP
Chávez 8'; Romero 37'

Estadio Victoria
Aguascalientes, Aguascalientes
Referee: Jorge Antonio Pérez Durán (Mexico)

=== Second leg ===
2009-12-05
19:00

Irapuato	3 – 0	Veracruz
Saucedo 13'; González 24', 34'

Estadio Sergio León Chavez
Irapuato, Guanajuato
Referee: Carlos Manuel Martínez Soto (Mexico

2009-12-06
12:00

BUAP	0 – 0	Necaxa

Estadio Cuauhtémoc
Puebla, Puebla
Referee: Victor Bisguerra Mendiola (Mexico

== Final ==
The first and second legs of the final are scheduled to be played on .

Team 1	Agg.	Team 2	1st leg	2nd leg
Irapuato (Mexico)	3 – 4	(Mexico) Necaxa	0 – 1	3 – 3

=== First leg ===
2009-12-09
17:00

Necaxa	1 – 0	Irapuato
Castillo 71'

Estadio Victoria
Aguascalientes, Aguascalientes
Referee: Carlos Manuel Martínez Soto (Mexico

=== Second leg ===
2009-12-12
19:00

Irapuato	3 – 3 (a.e.t.)	Necaxa
González 15' (pen.), 19'; Manrique 98'		Romero 33'; Castillo 91' 107'

Estadio Sergio León Chavez
Irapuato, Guanajuato
Referee: Fernando Guerrero Ramírez (Mexico

Necaxa won the Liga De Ascenso on a 4-3 aggregate score line

== Apertura Champion ==
Apertura 2009 winner:
Necaxa
1st Title

== Goalscorers ==
3 goals

- (Mexico) Ariel González
- (Mexico) Alejandro Castillo

2 goals

- (Uruguay) Álvaro Fabián González (BUAP)

1 goal

- (Uruguay) Nelson Sebastián Maz (Necaxa)
- (Mexico) Alejandro Castro (Cruz Azul Hidalgo)
- (Mexico) Raymundo Torres Rangel (Sinaloa)
- (Mexico) Luis Ángel García (Veracruz)
- (Mexico) Iván Vázquez (Necaxa)
- (Mexico) Juan Augusto Gómez (BUAP)
- (Mexico) Paulo Chávez (Necaxa)
