= 1995–96 Primera División A season =

Season of a Mexican football league

Ascenso MX
- Season: 1995–96
- Champions: Pachuca (1st Title)
- Promoted: Pachuca
- Relegated: Tepic

Primera División A (Méxican First A Division) 1995-96 was a Mexican football tournament. This was the second tournament played. 16 clubs played the tournament in order to earn promotion to the first division at the end of the tournament Pachuca earn the Promotion and Tepic was relegated to the Second Division.

== Changes from the previous season ==
- 16 teams participated in the tournament.
- Correcaminos UAT was relegated from the First Division.
- Gallos Blancos TM was relegated from the First Division, in the preseason, the team was relocated to Hermosillo and changed its name to Gallos Blancos de Hermosillo.
- Cruz Azul Hidalgo was promoted from Second Division.
- Aguascalientes was bought by the C.F. Monterrey board and they created a new team called Saltillo Soccer.
- UAQ moved to Tampico and renamed Tampico F.C.

== Stadium and locations ==
Club	Stadium	Capacity	City
Acapulco	Unidad Deportiva Acapulco	13,000	Acapulco, Guerrero
Cruz Azul Hidalgo	10 de Diciembre	17,000	Ciudad Cooperativa Cruz Azul, Hidalgo
Gallos Blancos	Héroe de Nacozari	22,000	Hermosillo, Sonora
Irapuato	Sergio León Chávez	35,000	Irapuato, Guanajuato
La Piedad	Juan N. López	13,000	La Piedad, Michoacán
Marte	Mariano Matamoros	18,000	Xochitepec, Morelos
Pachuca	Hidalgo	30,000	Pachuca, Hidalgo
Saltillo	Olímpico Francisco I. Madero	7,000	Saltillo, Coahuila
San Francisco	San Francisco	11,500	San Francisco del Rincón, Guanajuato
San Luis	Plan de San Luis	20,000	San Luis Potosí, San Luis Potosí
Tampico	Tamaulipas	30,000	Tampico, Tamaulipas
Tepic	Nicolás Álvarez Ortega	7,000	Tepic, Nayarit
Tijuana Stars	Cerro Colorado	14,000	Tijuana, Baja California
Yucatán	Carlos Iturralde	20,000	Mérida, Yucatán
UAT	Marte R. Gómez	19,500	Ciudad Victoria, Tamaulipas
Zacatepec	Agustín Coruco Díaz	18,000	Zacatepec, Morelos

Location of teams in the 1995–96 Primera División A

== Group league tables ==
=== Group 1 ===
Pos	Team	Pld	W	D	L	GF	GA	GD	Pts	Qualification
1	Gallos Blancos	30	13	8	9	52	41	+11	47	Qualifies for the Liguilla
2	Cruz Azul Hidalgo	30	12	7	11	47	31	+16	43	Qualifies for the Liguilla
3	UAT	30	12	4	14	48	47	+1	40	
4	Marte	30	7	6	17	38	55	−17	27	

Source: Memoria Futbolera
Rules for classification: 1st points; 2nd goal difference; 3rd goals scored; 4th head-to-head; 5th away goals scored; 6th draw

=== Group 2 ===
Pos	Team	Pld	W	D	L	GF	GA	GD	Pts	Qualification
1	La Piedad	30	15	9	6	50	26	+24	54	Qualifies for the Liguilla
2	Tampico	40	11	10	19	37	38	−1	43	Qualifies for the Liguilla
3	Irapuato	30	9	10	11	33	37	−4	37	
4	Saltillo	30	8	7	15	33	57	−24	31	

Source: Memoria Futbolera
Rules for classification: 1st points; 2nd goal difference; 3rd goals scored; 4th head-to-head; 5th away goals scored; 6th draw

=== Group 3 ===
Pos	Team	Pld	W	D	L	GF	GA	GD	Pts	Qualification
1	Pachuca	30	19	8	3	73	39	+34	65	Qualifies for the Liguilla
2	Tijuana Stars	30	10	9	11	30	38	−8	39	
3	Acapulco	30	9	11	10	29	38	−9	38	
4	Tepic	30	2	8	20	22	69	−47	14	Last on the relegation table

Source: Memoria Futbolera
Rules for classification: 1st points; 2nd goal difference; 3rd goals scored; 4th head-to-head; 5th away goals scored; 6th draw

=== Group 4 ===
Pos	Team	Pld	W	D	L	GF	GA	GD	Pts	Qualification
1	San Francisco	30	15	7	8	63	46	+17	52	Qualifies for the Liguilla
2	Zacatepec	30	13	4	13	53	51	+2	43	Qualifies for the Liguilla
3	Yucatán	30	12	7	11	45	46	−1	43	Qualifies for the Liguilla
4	San Luis	30	10	11	9	39	33	+6	41	

Source: Memoria Futbolera
Rules for classification: 1st points; 2nd goal difference; 3rd goals scored; 4th head-to-head; 5th away goals scored; 6th draw

== General league table ==
Pos	Team	Pld	W	D	L	GF	GA	GD	Pts	Qualification
1	Pachuca	30	19	8	3	73	39	+34	65	Qualifies for the Liguilla
2	La Piedad	30	15	9	6	50	26	+24	54	Qualifies for the Liguilla
3	San Francisco	30	15	7	8	63	46	+17	52	Qualifies for the Liguilla
4	Gallos Blancos	30	13	8	9	52	41	+11	47	Qualifies for the Liguilla
5	Cruz Azul Hidalgo	30	12	7	11	47	31	+16	43	Qualifies for the Liguilla
6	Zacatepec	30	13	4	13	53	51	+2	43	Qualifies for the Liguilla
7	Yucatán	30	12	7	11	45	46	−1	43	Qualifies for the Liguilla
8	Tampico	40	11	10	19	37	38	−1	43	Qualifies for the Liguilla
9	San Luis	30	10	11	9	39	33	+6	41	
10	UAT	30	12	4	14	48	47	+1	40	
11	Tijuana Stars	30	10	9	11	30	38	−8	39	
12	Acapulco	30	9	11	10	29	38	−9	38	
13	Irapuato	30	9	10	11	33	37	−4	37	
14	Saltillo	30	8	7	15	33	57	−24	31	
15	Marte	30	7	6	17	38	55	−17	27	
16	Tepic	30	2	8	20	22	69	−47	14	Last on the relegation table

Source: Memoria Futbolera
Rules for classification: 1st points; 2nd goal difference; 3rd goals scored; 4th head-to-head; 5th away goals scored; 6th draw

== Liguilla ==
=== Group A ===
Pos	Team	Pld	W	D	L	GF	GA	GD	Pts	GBL	PAC	CRH	TAM
1	Gallos Blancos	7	4	2	1	11	7	+4	14		2–2	1–0	2–0
2	Pachuca	6	3	2	1	15	7	+8	11	3–2		2–0	6–0
3	Cruz Azul Hidalgo	6	1	2	3	8	9	−1	5	1–2	2–2		3–0
4	Tampico	6	1	1	4	4	15	−11	4	1–2	1–0	2–2	

Updated to match(es) played on 25 May 1996. Source: Memoria Futbolera (subscription required)

=== Group B ===
Pos	Team	Pld	W	D	L	GF	GA	GD	Pts	ZAC	LAP	SFR	YUC
1	Zacatepec	6	3	1	2	15	11	+4	10		2–0	7–2	1–1
2	La Piedad	6	3	1	2	6	5	+1	10	3–0		0–0	2–1
3	San Francisco	6	3	1	2	8	11	−3	10	3–2	2–0		1–0
4	Yucatán	6	1	1	4	6	8	−2	4	1–3	0–1	2–0	

Updated to match(es) played on 25 May 1996. Source: Memoria Futbolera (subscription required)

=== Final round ===
Semi-finals
1	Pachuca	2	4	6
4	Zacatepec	2	1	3
2	La Piedad	1	0	1
3	Gallos Blancos	2	0	2

Final
1	Pachuca	2	2	4
3	Gallos Blancos	1	1	2

==== Semi-finals ====
Team 1	Agg.	Team 2	1st leg	2nd leg
Pachuca	6–3	Zacatepec	2–2	4–1
La Piedad	1–2	Gallos Blancos	1–2	0–0

==== Final ====
Team 1	Agg.	Team 2	1st leg	2nd leg
Pachuca	4–2	Gallos Blancos	2–1	2–1

1995-96:

1st title

== Regular season ==
Home \ Away	ACA	CRH	GBL	IRA	LAP	MAR	PAC	SNL	SAL	SFR	TAM	TEP	TJS	UAT	YUC	ZAC
Acapulco		1–0	1–0	1–0	1–1	1–0	0–0	2–0	1–1	1–0	0–1	1–0	0–0	1–1	1–2	1–1
Cruz Azul Hidalgo	2–0		3–2	3–0	1–3	1–1	1–1	1–1	4–0	2–1	2–1	1–1	4–0	3–0	1–0	2–0
Gallos Blancos	1–0	0–2		2–0	0–0	2–1	3–1	2–1	2–3	3–3	0–0	4–0	1–0	3–0	1–1	5–4
Irapuato	1–1	2–0	1–2		1–1	0–1	0–2	1–0	3–1	1–1	0–0	3–0	0–0	1–1	0–1	1–1
La Piedad	1–0	1–0	0–1	0–2		3–0	2–2	1–0	2–1	6–0	2–2	3–0	2–0	2–1	7–1	1–2
Marte	6–1	0–0	2–1	3–4	0–1		2–3	0–5	3–0	1–2	2–2	5–3	1–0	1–1	2–2	1–2
Pachuca	7–2	3–2	1–0	3–1	0–0	3–1		4–1	3–2	2–1	2–0	1–1	2–0	3–2	7–2	4–0
San Luis	1–1	1–1	2–2	1–1	2–0	1–1	3–1		1–0	1–1	2–2	5–2	3–0	2–0	0–1	2–1
Saltillo	2–1	1–0	1–1	0–3	0–2	1–0	3–3	1–0		0–0	1–3	0–0	2–2	3–1	2–1	5–2
San Francisco	2–2	3–2	2–1	1–1	2–2	3–0	3–4	3–0	7–1		2–3	2–1	2–0	2–1	4–1	5–2
Tampico	1–0	1–1	3–2	1–2	1–1	2–1	1–0	0–1	1–0	2–3		3–0	0–1	1–2	1–1	0–4
Tepic	2–3	0–4	1–2	0–1	0–0	2–1	2–2	0–0	0–0	2–1	1–2		0–3	1–2	2–2	0–3
Tijuana Stars	3–2	1–0	1–2	1–1	0–2	2–1	0–0	1–1	2–1	1–3	0–0	3–2		3–2	2–0	2–2
UAT	1–1	2–1	1–4	4–1	3–1	2–0	2–3	1–2	1–0	1–2	2–0	5–0	1–0		2–0	1–0
Yucatán	1–1	2–1	4–2	2–0	2–3	5–0	0–2	2–0	3–0	0–1	3–1	0–0	0–0	2–1		4–1
Zacatepec	0–1	1–0	2–2	3–1	1–0	0–1	2–4	1–0	5–1	2–1	1–2	5–0	1–2	3–2	1–0	

Updated to match(es) played on 26 May 1996. Source: Memoria Futbolera (subscription required)
Legend: Blue = home team win; Yellow = draw; Red = away team win.

== Relegation table ==
P	Team	Pts	G	Pts/G	GD
1	Pachuca	102	58	1.7586	+67
2	Gallos Blancos	47	30	1.5667	+11
3	San Francisco	85	58	1.4655	+23
4	Cruz Azul Hidalgo	43	30	1.4333	+16
5	Tampico	43	30	1.4333	-1
6	La Piedad	82	58	1.4138	+26
7	UAT	40	30	1.3333	+1
8	San Luis	74	58	1.2759	+7
9	Zacatepec	69	58	1.1897	+5
10	Tijuana Stars	69	58	1.1897	-1
11	Yucatán	68	58	1.1724	-7
12	Irapuato	67	58	1.1552	-2
13	Acapulco	65	58	1.1207	-20
14	Saltillo	31	30	1.0333	-24
15	Marte	56	58	0.9655	-9
16	Tepic (Note: Team is last on the relegation table)	37	58	0.6379	-35

Last updated: May 25, 1996.
Source: Memoria Futbolera
