= Casartelli =

Casartelli is an Italian surname. Notable people with the surname include:

- Carlos Casartelli (born 1974), Argentine footballer
- Fabio Casartelli (1970–1995), Italian cyclist
- Fernando Casartelli (born 1976), Argentine footballer
- Louis Charles Casartelli (1852–1925), fourth Bishop of Salford

== See also ==
- Casartelli Building
