= Mosqueda =

Surname list

Mosqueda is a surname. Notable people with the surname include:

- Juan Carlos Mosqueda (born 1985), Mexican football player
- Kaleena Mosqueda-Lewis (born 1993), American basketball player
- Sylvia Mosqueda (born 1966), American long-distance runner
- Teresa Mosqueda, American politician and labor activist
