= Roberto Salcedo =

Roberto Salcedo may refer to:

- Roberto Salcedo Jr. (born 1979), Dominican comedian
- Roberto Salcedo Sr. (born 1953), Dominican politician
- Roberto Alejandro Salcedo (born 1991), Mexican footballer
