= Alain N'Kong =

Cameroonian footballer (born 1979)

Personal information
- Full name: Alain Mosely N'Kong
- Date of birth: 6 April 1979 (age 47)
- Place of birth: Yaoundé, Cameroon
- Height: 1.79 m (5 ft 10 in)
- Position: Attacking midfielder

Senior career*
Years	Team	Apps	(Gls)
1998–2000	Canon Yaoundé	63	(14)
2000–2001	Freamunde	14	(0)
2001–2002	Villa Española	28	(18)
2002–2003	Las Palmas	11	(1)
2003	Paços de Ferreira	0	(0)
2004	Nacional	10	(1)
2005–2007	Colorado Rapids	33	(5)
2007	Atlante	22	(4)
2008	León	1	(0)
2008–2009	Boulogne	19	(2)
2009–2010	Indios	30	(1)
2010–2011	Aceh United	17	(8)
2011–2012	Arema Indonesia	11	(3)
2012–2013	Persebaya 1927	12	(4)
2013–2014	Persepam Madura United	20	(3)
Total		291	(64)

International career
2001–2008	Cameroon	23	(10)
Medal record
Men's football
Representing Cameroon
Africa Cup of Nations
Runner-up	2008 Ghana
- * Club domestic league appearances and goals

Alain N'Kong (born 6 April 1979) is a Cameroonian former professional football who played as a midfielder.

== Club career ==
N'Kong was born in Yaoundé, Cameroon. Early in his career, he played all over the world, including Las Palmas in Spain, Nacional in Uruguay, and Paços de Ferreira in Portugal.

N'Kong signed with Major League Soccer club Colorado Rapids prior to the 2005 season. Despite having a successful season, he was released in November 2005. He returned to Colorado in August 2006 but was again waived at the end of the season, and subsequently joined Atlante.

On 11 August 2007, he scored the first goal in the newly renovated Estadio Quintana Roo in Cancún as well as his first goal for Atlante, against Pumas. He won the Apertura 2007 with Atlante, becoming the first African player to win a league title in Mexico. After Atlante won the championship, N'Kong was released from the team becoming a free agent.

In the Apertura 2008 he played with León in the Primera División A. N'Kong signed with French side US Boulogne in November 2008 on a one-season deal. N'Kong returned to Mexico to play for Indios for the Apertura 2009, signing a one-year contract.

On 5 April 2012, N'Kong joined Arema Indonesia. He moved to Persepam Madura United later that year.

== International career ==
N'Kong represented Cameroon at various youth levels and appeared with the senior national team in qualifiers for the 2002 FIFA World Cup.

On 7 February 2008, he scored the winning goal with a finish from a Samuel Eto'o through pass which sent Cameroon into the final of the 2008 Africa Cup of Nations knocking out hosts Ghana. Cameroon lost the final 0–1 against defending champions Egypt.

== Career statistics ==
Scores and results list Cameroon's goal tally first.

No	Date	Venue	Opponent	Score	Result	Competition
1.	7 February 2008	Ohene Djan Stadium, Accra, Ghana	Ghana	1–0	1–0	2008 Africa Cup of Nations

== Honours ==
Canon Yaoundé

- Cameroonian Cup: 1999

Villa Española

- Uruguayan Segunda División: 2001

Atlante

- Mexican Primera División: Apertura 2007

León

- Primera División A: Clausura 2008

Cameroon

- African Cup of Nations: runner-up, 2008
