= Orlando Pineda =

Orlando Pineda may refer to:

- Orlando Pineda (footballer) (born 1986), Mexican footballer
- Orlando Pineda (actor) (born 1995), Colombian actor
