= Primera División A Clausura 2008 =

Season of a Mexican football league

Liga de Ascenso
- Season: 2007–08
- Champions: León (3rd Title)
- Promoted: Indios
- Relegated: Tijuana

Primera División A (Méxican First A Division) Clausura 2008 is a Méxican football tournament – one of two tournaments held in one year. It began Friday, January 11, 2008. Reigning champions Indios could not defend their title, as Club León wins their 3rd title in Primera División A, and earned the right to battle Indios in a two-leg aggregate to try to earn promotion to the Primera División de México. In the 1st leg, which was played at Estadio Olímpico Benito Juárez, Indios defeated León by a score of 1–0. In the 2nd leg at Estadio León resulted in a 2–2 tie, hence earning Indios a spot into the Primera División.

== Group league tables ==
=== Group 1 ===
Pos	Team	Pld	W	D	L	GF	GA	GD	Pts	Qualification
1	Sinaloa	17	10	5	2	31	14	+17	35	Qualifies for the Liguilla
2	León	17	9	6	2	45	23	+22	33	Qualifies for the Liguilla
3	Durango	17	9	4	4	28	23	+5	31	Qualifies for the Liguilla
4	Tijuana	17	8	3	6	23	16	+7	27	Last on the relegation table
5	Salamanca	17	7	3	7	21	23	−2	24	Qualifies for the Liguilla
6	UAG A	17	6	4	7	17	21	−4	22	
7	Tapatío	17	6	3	8	14	21	−7	21	
8	Monarcas Morelia A	17	4	6	7	21	25	−4	18	
9	Querétaro	17	4	6	7	23	30	−7	18	
10	Real Colima	17	4	5	8	19	26	−7	17	
11	Académicos	17	4	4	9	18	27	−9	16	
12	Santos Laguna A	17	3	3	11	16	31	−15	12	

Source: FMF
Rules for classification: 1st points; 2nd goal difference; 3rd goals scored; 4th head-to-head; 5th away goals scored; 6th draw

=== Group 2 ===
Pos	Team	Pld	W	D	L	GF	GA	GD	Pts	Qualification
1	Coatzacoalcos	17	8	6	3	21	18	+3	30	Qualifies for the Liguilla
2	Tampico Madero	17	8	5	4	23	23	0	29	Qualifies for the Liguilla
3	UANL	17	7	7	3	22	15	+7	28	Qualifies for the Liguilla
4	Cruz Azul	17	8	4	5	21	15	+6	28	Qualifies for the Liguilla
5	Indios	17	6	8	3	27	14	+13	26	
6	BUAP	17	7	4	6	22	16	+6	25	
7	UNAM	17	7	4	6	23	26	−3	25	
8	Atlético Mexiquense	17	6	5	6	17	16	+1	23	
9	UAT	17	5	6	6	23	17	+6	21	
10	Monterrey A	17	4	6	7	23	28	−5	18	
11	Socio Águila	17	5	2	10	14	26	−12	17	
12	Tapachula	17	3	3	11	14	32	−18	12	

Source: FMF
Rules for classification: 1st points; 2nd goal difference; 3rd goals scored; 4th head-to-head; 5th away goals scored; 6th draw

== General league table ==
Pos	Team	Pld	W	D	L	GF	GA	GD	Pts	Qualification
1	Sinaloa	17	10	5	2	31	14	+17	35	Qualifies for the Liguilla
2	León	17	9	6	2	45	23	+22	33	Qualifies for the Liguilla
3	Durango	17	9	4	4	28	23	+5	31	Qualifies for the Liguilla
4	Coatzacoalcos	17	8	6	3	21	18	+3	30	Qualifies for the Liguilla
5	Tampico Madero	17	8	5	4	23	23	0	29	Qualifies for the Liguilla
6	UANL	17	7	7	3	22	15	+7	28	Qualifies for the Liguilla
7	Cruz Azul	17	8	4	5	21	15	+6	28	Qualifies for the Liguilla
8	Tijuana	17	8	3	6	23	16	+7	27	Last on the relegation table
9	Ciudad Juárez	17	6	8	3	27	14	+13	26	
10	BUAP	17	7	4	6	22	16	+6	25	
11	UNAM	17	7	4	6	23	26	−3	25	
12	Salamanca	17	7	3	7	21	23	−2	24	Qualifies for the Liguilla
13	Atlético Mexiquense	17	6	5	6	17	16	+1	23	
14	UAG	17	6	4	7	17	21	−4	22	
15	UAT	17	5	6	6	23	17	+6	21	
16	Tapatío	17	6	3	8	14	21	−7	21	
17	Morelia	17	4	6	7	21	25	−4	18	
18	Monterrey	17	4	6	7	23	28	−5	18	
19	Querétaro	17	4	6	7	23	30	−7	18	
20	Real Colima	17	4	5	8	19	26	−7	17	
21	Socio Águila	17	5	2	10	14	26	−12	17	
22	Académicos	17	4	4	9	18	27	−9	16	
23	Santos Laguna	17	3	3	11	16	31	−15	12	
24	Tapachula	17	3	3	11	14	32	−18	12	

Source: FMF
Rules for classification: 1st points; 2nd goal difference; 3rd goals scored; 4th head-to-head; 5th away goals scored; 6th draw

== Liguilla ==
Quarterfinals
1	Sinaloa	0	1	1
8	Salamanca	0	1	1
5	Coatzacoalcos	1	4	5
4	Tampico Madero	0	2	2
3	Durango	0	0	0
6	UANL	0	0	0
7	León	2	1	3
2	Cruz Azul	0	1	1

Semifinals
1	Sinaloa	0	1	1
4	Coatzacoalcos	0	0	0
3	Durango	0	2	2
2	León	0	3	3

Finals
1	Sinaloa	2	0	2
2	León	2	1	3

Clausura 2008 winner:

3rd title

== Promotional Final ==
=== First leg ===
May 22, 2008
19:00

Indios	1–0	León
Carlos Casartelli 76'

Estadio Olímpico Benito Juárez, Ciudad Juárez
Referee: Hugo León Guajardo

=== Second leg ===
May 25, 2008
12:00

León	2–2	Indios
Tomás Quiñones 23'; Sebastián Maz 71'		David Stringel 59'; Héctor Gómez 84'

Estadio León, León, Guanajuato

== Top scorers ==
Scorer	Goals	Team
(Paraguay) Fredy Bareiro	17	León
(Mexico) Víctor Lojero	15	Tampico Madero
(Mexico) Martín Calderón	12	Durango
(Mexico) Julio Frías	8	Ciudad Juárez
(Mexico) Pedro Solís	8	UAT
(Mexico) Alejandro Molina	8	Monterrey
(Mexico) Javier Orozco	8	Cruz Azul
(Uruguay) Nelson Maz	8	Ciudad Juárez
(Mexico) Miguel Casanova	7	Tapachula
(Mexico) Mauricio Romero	7	León
(Mexico) Bardo Fierros	7	Sinaloa
(Mexico) Roberto Nurse	7	Querétaro
(Mexico) Samuel Ochoa	7	UAG
(Mexico) Eduardo García	7	Académicos
(Mexico) Jair García	6	Cruz Azul

Last updated: May 3, 2008.
Source: FMF
