= Jonathan Jáuregui =

Mexican footballer (born 1986)

Personal information
- Full name: Jonathan Emmanuel Jáuregui Hernández
- Date of birth: 27 October 1986 (age 40)
- Place of birth: Guadalajara, Mexico
- Height: 5 ft 7 in (1.70 m)
- Position: Striker

Youth career
- –: Tecos F.C.

Senior career*
| Years | Team | Apps | (Gls) |
| 2006–2009 | Tecos B | 27 | (1) |
| 2009 | Veracruz | 0 | (0) |
| 2010 | Sport Boys | 9 | (2) |
| 2012 | Sport Boys | 5 | (1) |
| 2012–2013 | Altamira F.C. | 5 | (0) |
| 2013–2015 | NK Jedinstvo Sveti Križ Začretje | _ | (_) |
| 2015 | Europa F.C. | _ | (_) |
- * Club domestic league appearances and goals as of 17:33, February 2016 (UTC)

Jonathan Emmanuel Jáuregui Hernández (born 27 October 1986) is a Mexican footballer who last played for Europa F.C. in the Gibraltar Premier Division. He mainly plays as a striker.

== Career ==
Jáuregui began his career as a teenager, playing in the youth teams of prestigious clubs such as Estudiantes, Tiburones Rojos de Veracruz and Tecos F.C., before getting his big break at then Peruvian Primera División side Sport Boys, where, in two spells, one in 2010 and one 2012, he played in 14 games and scored 3 goals. He later signed for then Ascenso MX side Altamira F.C., playing 5 games.

At the start of 2013, he moved to Europe to play for Bosnian Lower-League side NK Jedinstvo Sveti Križ Začretje, where he played for over two years before signing for Gibraltar Premier Division club Europa F.C. in February 2015. However he left the club in under 6 months.
