= Nuevo Estadio León =

Proposed stadium in Guanajuanto, Mexico

- Location: León, Guanajuato
- Owner: Grupo Pachuca & the State of Guanajuato
- Operator: Club León
- Capacity: 35,000 Proposed
- Surface: Grass

Construction
- Opened: Cancelled
- Cost: US$326 million
- Architect: HKS, Inc.
- General contractor: Manhattan

Tenant
- Club León

The new Estadio León was a proposed stadium in Leon, Guanajuato. The Club León football team was expected to make this their home stadium upon its proposed completion in 2023. It was expected a capacity of 35,000. The previous Estadio León was built in 1967.

On 15 September 2023, Grupo Pachuca announced the cancellation of the new stadium project. The decision was made due to the inability to carry out the project. Instead, the Estadio León will undergo renovations.
