= Jorge Zataraín =

Mexican footballer (born 1988)

Personal information
- Full name: Jorge Zataraín Pindeda
- Date of birth: March 31, 1988
- Place of birth: Mazatlán, Sinaloa, Mexico

Senior career*
Years	Team	Apps	(Gls)
- Club Necaxa
- C.D. Veracruz
- Altamira F.C.
- C.D. Irapuato
- Club León
- Cafetaleros de Tapachula
- → Murciélagos F.C.
- * Club domestic league appearances and goals

Jorge Zataraín Pindeda (born 31 March 1988 in Mazatlán, Sinaloa) is a Mexican professional footballer who last played for Murciélagos of Ascenso MX on loan from Tapachula.

== Career ==
Born in Mazatlán, Zataraín played in Ascenso MX with Necaxa, Veracruz, Altamira and Irapuato. He had a very brief spell in Liga MX with Club León.
