= César Saldivar =

Mexican footballer (born 1983)

César Saldívar
Personal information
- Full name: César Armando Saldívar Robles
- Date of birth: 20 September 1983 (age 43)
- Place of birth: Matamoros, Tamaulipas, Mexico
- Height: 1.76 m (5 ft 9 1/2 in)
- Position: Defender

Senior career*
Years	Team	Apps	(Gls)
2005–2009	Petroleros Salamanca	77	(3)
2009–2010	La Piedad	31	(0)
2010–2011	Altamira	28	(3)
2011	La Piedad	15	(1)
2012	Necaxa	3	(0)
2012	San Luis F.C.	2	(0)
2013–2014	Dorados de Sinaloa	27	(3)
2014–2015	Tepic	17	(0)
2015	Venados	16	(0)
- * Club domestic league appearances and goals as of 26 April 2013

César Armando Saldívar Robles (Note: In this Spanish name, the first or paternal surname is Saldívar and the second or maternal family name is Robles.) (born September 20, 1983) is a Mexican former football defender who last played for Tepic in the Ascenso MX.

== Career ==
Saldívar made his professional debut for Petroleros de Salamanca on September 17, 2005, against Club Tijuana, during a 0–0 tie. He would become a common fixture in the defense, and was part of the Apertura 2006 team that made a run to the finals, losing to Puebla FC in the championship.

When Salamanca changed venues to La Piedad, Saldívar was one of the many Salamanca players who relocated to Michoacán along with the team.
