= César Valdovinos =

Mexican footballer (born 1986)

Personal information
- Full name: César Evaristo Valdovinos Barragán
- Date of birth: 29 November 1986 (age 39)
- Place of birth: Colima, Mexico
- Position: Midfielder

Senior career*
Years	Team	Apps	(Gls)
2008–2014	Leones Negros UdeG	143	(8)
2014–2015	Atlético San Luis	0	(0)
2015–2016	Alebrijes de Oaxaca	5	(0)
2016–2017	Loros UdeC	8	(0)
Total		156	(8)
- * Club domestic league appearances and goals

César Evaristo Valdovinos Barragán (born 29 November 1986) is a Mexican former professional footballer.

Despite never playing for the club, Valdovinos was inducted into the Colima F.C. Hall of Fame in 2021 for his contributions to sport in Colima.
