= Éder Patiño =

Mexican footballer (born 1984)

Éder Patiño (born March 11, 1984, in Mexico City) is a Mexican former footballer who last played for UAT.

== See also ==
- Football in Mexico
- List of football clubs in Mexico
