= Fernando Casartelli =

Argentine footballer (born 1976)

Personal information
- Full name: Fernando Cristobal Casartelli Torregrosa
- Date of birth: 13 October 1976 (age 50)
- Place of birth: Villa Ángela, Argentina
- Height: 1.86 m (6 ft 1 in)
- Position: Defender

Youth career
- 1996–1997: Boca Juniors

Senior career*
Years	Team	Apps	(Gls)
1997–2003	Gimnasia Jujuy	153	(12)
2003–2004	FC Gueugnon	34	(6)
2004–2006	Amiens SC	46	(15)
2007–2008	Brest	30	(1)
- * Club domestic league appearances and goals as of 20 April 2008

Fernando Casartelli (born 13 October 1976) is a former Argentine footballer who last played for Brest. He retired in 2008, at the age of 31 for medical reasons.

His brother Carlos is a footballer.
