= Ezequiel Orozco =

Mexican footballer (1988–2018)

Personal information
- Full name: Ezequiel Francisco Orozco Padilla
- Date of birth: 23 November 1988
- Place of birth: Los Mochis, Sinaloa, Mexico
- Date of death: 16 March 2018 (aged 29)
- Place of death: Los Mochis, Sinaloa, Mexico
- Height: 1.77 m (5 ft 9 1/2 in)
- Position: Forward

Youth career
- 2007–2009: Necaxa

Senior career*
Years	Team	Apps	(Gls)
2009–2014	Necaxa	75	(6)
2009–2010	→ Chiapas (loan)	25	(5)
2013	→ Atlante (loan)	2	(0)
2015	Altamira	10	(2)
2016	Murciélagos	14	(0)
Total		126	(13)
- * Club domestic league appearances and goals

Ezequiel Francisco Orozco Padilla (23 November 1988 – 16 March 2018) was a Mexican professional football forward who last played for Murciélagos in the Ascenso MX. In November 2016, Orozco was diagnosed with lung cancer, suspending his football career to have treatment. He died on 16 March 2018 at the age of 29.
