= Horacio Sánchez =

Mexican footballer (born 1953)

Personal information
- Full name: Horacio Sánchez Márquez
- Date of birth: 22 March 1953 (age 73)
- Place of birth: Mexico City, Mexico
- Height: 1.73 m (5 ft 8 in)
- Position: Goalkeeper

Senior career*
Years	Team	Apps	(Gls)
1973–1978	UNAM Pumas	44	(0)
1978–1981	Necaxa	30	(0)
1981–1983	Leon	23	(0)
1983–1984	Monarcas Morelia	0	(0)
1984–1985	Puebla	7	(0)

International career
1972	Mexico	5	(0)
- * Club domestic league appearances and goals

Horacio Sánchez Márquez (born 22 March 1953) is a Mexican former footballer. He competed in the men's tournament at the 1972 Summer Olympics.
