= Carlos Trejo =

Mexican footballer (born 1983)

Personal information
- Full name: Carlos Alberto Trejo Sánchez
- Date of birth: 20 March 1983 (age 43)
- Place of birth: Mexico City, Mexico
- Height: 1.76 m (5 ft 9 1/2 in)
- Position: Goalkeeper

Team information
- Current team: Jaguares (Manager)

Senior career*
Years	Team	Apps	(Gls)
2004–2013	San Luis	26	(0)
2011–2012	→ Necaxa (loan)	10	(0)
2013–2015	Chiapas	1	(0)
2013–2014	→ Mérida (loan)	3	(0)

Managerial career
- 2017–2018: Tepatitlán (Liga TDP)
- 2018–2022: Tepatitlán (Goalkeeper coach)
- 2022–2023: Celaya (Goalkeeper coach)
- 2023: Coatepeque (Goalkeeper coach)
- 2024: Tlaxcala (Goalkeeper coach)
- 2025: Jaguares (Assistant)
- 2025–: Jaguares
- * Club domestic league appearances and goals as of 21 November 2015

Carlos Alberto Trejo Sánchez (born March 20, 1983) is a Mexican former professional football goalkeeper who last played for Chiapas. Since 30 September 2025 is the manager of Jaguares.
