= Juan Manuel Cavallo =

Argentine footballer

Personal information
- Date of birth: 8 December 1981 (age 44)
- Place of birth: La Para, Argentina
- Height: 1.84 m (6 ft 0 in)
- Position: Forward

Senior career*
Years	Team	Apps	(Gls)
2004	Sportivo Belgrano		
2005	9 de Julio de Morteros		
2005–2006	Persik Kediri	18	(7)
2006–2008	Tiro Federal		
2008–2009	Rangers	16	(3)
2009–2010	Cienciano	35	(9)
2010–2011	Albinegros de Orizaba	35	(19)
2011	San Luis	12	(2)
2011–2012	Sportivo Desamparados	16	(3)
2012	Necaxa	11	(3)
2012–2013	La Piedad	24	(14)
2013–2014	Lobos BUAP	10	(0)
2014	Leones Negros	12	(1)
2014–2015	CA Atlanta	8	(2)
2015	Irapuato	10	(5)
2015–2017	Alebrijes de Oaxaca	28	(7)
2017	Central Córdoba		
2017–2019	Crucero del Norte	10	(2)
2019–2020	Marquense		
2021	Marquense		

Managerial career
- 2024: San Martín de Tucumán (assistant)
- * Club domestic league appearances and goals

Juan Manuel Cavallo (born 8 December 1981) is an Argentine football coach and a former player.

== Career ==
Cavallo played for Rangers of Talca, who reached the semifinals of the Torneo Clausura 2008. Then he became part of Cienciano of Cuzco, where he made his international debut to play in the Copa Sudamericana 2009. In 2010, he joined Albinegros de Orizaba, where he achieved an outstanding performance, in which he was one of the key pieces to helping the team reach the semifinals of the Apertura. He became the top scorer of the team and one of the top scorers of the season in Mexican football's second division. As a result of his achievements he got the chance to sign for San Luis Fútbol Club, who participated in the Torneo Clausura 2011 and the Copa Libertadores de América.
