= Gallos Blancos de Hermosillo =

- Full name: Gallos Blancos de Hermosillo
- Nickname(s): Gallos Blancos
- Founded: 1995
- Dissolved: 1996
- Ground: Estadio Héroe de Nacozari; Hermosillo, Sonora, Mexico
- Capacity: 22,000
- Chairman: Alejandro Domínguez
- League: Primera División 'A' de México
Home colours	Away colours

The Gallos Blancos de Hermosillo was a Mexican football team that played in the Primera Division 'A' de México from 1995 to 1996. The team was based in Hermosillo, Sonora and was a reserves team of the Querétaro franchise.

== History ==
The origin of the club goes back to the 1994–95 season, when the Querétaro franchise was reborn after Tampico-Madero had economic and financial problems with their stadium and changed its name to Tampico Madero Gallos Blancos to play the remaining 9 games of the season. At the end of the season the team would be relegated to the Primera División 'A' de México, and this would lead to the origin of the club in Hermosillo, Sonora.

Entrepreneurs turned their gaze to new destinations with footballing future, so they decide to move the team of Querétaro to Hermosillo, Sonora, a city located in northwest Mexico where, at the time, football was virtually an unknown sport. The challenge was to attract fans in a baseball and basketball-dominated region. The old team Tampico Madero Gallos Blancos would be called Gallos Blancos de Hermosillo, with Alejandro Domínguez as coach and owners at the time were the Alverde brothers.

They would play only one season in the city but achieved several successes including reaching the final of the 1995–96 season against Pachuca, which lose promotion to the Primera División de México. The two meetings would be in favor of Pachuca with a score of 2–1, with an aggregate of 4–2.

== Stadium ==
The Gallos Blancos de Hermosillo played their matches at the biggest stage of the capital city of the state of Sonora, the Estadio Héroe de Nacozari. The stadium holds 22,000 seats and has also hosted other football teams like Coyotes de Sonora and Búhos de Hermosillo.

== Honours ==
Runner-up Primera Division 'A' (1): 1995-96
