= Franz Torres =

Mexican footballer (born 1981)

Personal information
- Full name: Franz Eric Torres Jaimes
- Date of birth: 25 July 1981 (age 45)
- Place of birth: Mexico City, Mexico
- Height: 1.68 m (5 ft 6 in)
- Position: Defender

Senior career*
Years	Team	Apps	(Gls)
2001–2005	UNAM	5	(1)
2002	→ Morelia (loan)	1	(0)
2002–2003	→ Jaguares de Chiapas (loan)	22	(0)
2003	→ Atlante (loan)	7	(0)
2004	→ Altamira (loan)	18	(1)
2005	→ BUAP (loan)	10	(1)
2006–2008	Pumas Morelos	18	(1)
2008–2009	Veracruz	6	(0)
2009–2010	BUAP	11	(0)
2011–2020	Celaya	157	(5)
- * Club domestic league appearances and goals as of 29 July 2020

Franz Torres (born July 25, 1981) is a former Mexican professional footballer who last played for Celaya on loan from UNAM of Liga MX.
