= Darío Gandín =

Argentine footballer

Personal information
- Full name: Darío Alejandro Gandín
- Date of birth: 7 December 1983 (age 42)
- Place of birth: Santa Fe, Argentina
- Height: 1.79 m (5 ft 10 in)
- Position: Forward

Team information
- Current team: Atlético de Rafaela

Senior career*
Years	Team	Apps	(Gls)
2001–2004	Atlético de Rafaela	82	(16)
2004–2005	Colón	27	(5)
2005	Argentinos Juniors	8	(0)
2006	León	17	(9)
2006–2007	Gimnasia de Jujuy	34	(7)
2007–2008	Colón	35	(10)
2008–2010	Independiente	63	(17)
2010–2011	Club Necaxa	20	(4)
2011–2013	Atlético de Rafaela	37	(13)
2013–2014	Colón	16	(1)
2014–2015	Aldosivi	1	(0)
2016–2017	Ben Hur		
2017–	Atlético de Rafaela	0	(0)
- * Club domestic league appearances and goals as of 1 April 2016

Darío Alejandro Gandín (born 7 December 1983) is an Argentine football striker who plays for Atlético de Rafaela.

== Career ==
Gandín started his career in the Primera B Nacional (Argentine second division) playing for Atlético de Rafaela in 2001. He helped the team win both the Apertura and Clausura titles during the 2002–03 season, resulting in automatic promotion to the Argentine Primera División.

In 2004, Gandín left Atlético de Rafaela to join Club Atlético Colón, a club he later rejoined in 2007, after spells with Argentinos Juniors, Gimnasia y Esgrima de Jujuy and León of Mexico.

The forward arrived to Independiente in 2008. In the 2009 Apertura, Gandín scored 10 goals in 19 matches, and was subsequently sold to Necaxa in Mexico.

In 2011, Gandín returned to Atlético de Rafaela, recently promoted to the Primera División. On August 5, 2011, he scored the first two goals of the 2011–12 Argentine Primera División season in Rafaela's 2–0 away victory over Banfield.

On 9 July 2013, Gandín rejoined Colón for a third time.

In 2016, he joined Ben Hur of Rafaela.

== Honours ==
Atlético de Rafaela

- Primera B Nacional (1): 2002–03
