= Alejandro Mercado =

Mexican footballer and manager (born 1983)

Personal information
- Full name: Alejandro Julio Mercado Aguilar
- Date of birth: 4 September 1983 (age 43)
- Place of birth: Cuernavaca, Morelos, Mexico
- Position: Defender

Senior career*
Years	Team	Apps	(Gls)
2003–2004	León	25	(1)
2004–2005	Querétaro	25	(0)
2005	León	17	(1)
2005	Atlante	1	(0)
2006	León	4	(0)
2006	UAG	12	(0)
2007	UAT	17	(0)
2007	BUAP	13	(2)
2008–2009	Potros Chetumal	23	(0)
2009–2010	Atlante UTN	42	(1)
2010	Atlante	2	(0)
2011	Dorados de Sinaloa	26	(2)
2012–2013	Necaxa	26	(0)
2013	Alebrijes de Oaxaca	2	(0)
2014–2015	Irapuato	10	(0)

Managerial career
- 2017: Murciélagos (Assistant)
- 2017: Pacific
- 2017–2018: Murciélagos (Assistant)
- 2018: Murciélagos (Interim)
- 2026: Mazatlán (Assistant)
- * Club domestic league appearances and goals

Alejandro Julio Mercado Aguilar (born September 4, 1983) is a Mexican football manager and former player.
