= Juan Augusto Gómez =

Argentine footballer (born 1976)

Personal information
- Full name: Juan Augusto Gómez Olmos
- Date of birth: 24 May 1976 (age 50)
- Place of birth: Tucumán, Argentina
- Height: 1.72 m (5 ft 8 in)
- Position: Midfielder

Team information
- Current team: Mazorqueros (assistant)

Senior career*
Years	Team	Apps	(Gls)
1995–1996	El Porvenir	2	(0)
1999–2000	Tigres	12	(1)
2001	Tigres Ciudad Juárez		
2002–2004	Correcaminos	33	(3)
2005	Lobos de la BUAP	16	(1)
2006	Tampico Madero	12	(1)
2006–2007	Veracruz	21	(2)
2007–2011	C.F. Ciudad Juárez	82	(10)
2009–2010	→ BUAP (loan)	31	(3)
2012	Estudiantes de Altamira	7	(1)
2013	Universidad de Guadalajara	8	(0)

Managerial career
- 2015: Altamira (assistant)
- 2015–2016: Juárez (assistant)
- 2018–2019: Tapachula (assistant)
- 2020–: Mazorqueros (assistant)
- * Club domestic league appearances and goals

Juan Augusto Gómez Olmos (born 24 May 1976) is an Argentina football coach and former player.
