= Luis Francisco García =

Mexican footballer (born 1987)

Personal information
- Full name: Luis Francisco García Caldera
- Date of birth: 21 June 1987 (age 39)
- Place of birth: Guadalajara, Jalisco, Mexico
- Height: 1.78 m (5 ft 10 in)
- Position: Defender

Senior career*
| Years | Team | Apps | (Gls) |
| 2006–2009 | Necaxa | 42 | (0) |
| 2009–2010 | → Indios (on loan) | 20 | (0) |
| 2010–2014 | Necaxa | 48 | (0) |
- * Club domestic league appearances and goals

Luis Francisco García Caldera (born June 21, 1987) is a Mexican retired footballer who last played for Necaxa.

== Club career ==
"Guicho" García joined Indios de Ciudad Juárez for the Apertura 2009 tournament.
