= Iván Vázquez (footballer) =

Mexican footballer (born 1982)

Personal information
- Full name: Edmundo Iván Vázquez Mellado Pérez
- Date of birth: 14 December 1982 (age 43)
- Place of birth: Mexico City, Mexico
- Height: 1.78 m (5 ft 10 in)
- Position: Goalkeeper

Senior career*
Years	Team	Apps	(Gls)
2002–2003	Correcaminos	11	(0)
2003–2004	Leones Morelos	13	(0)
2004–2014	Necaxa	198	(2)
2012–2013	→ Correcaminos (loan)	31	(0)
2014–2015	Leones Negros	12	(0)
2015–2021	Juárez	128	(0)
2021–2022	León	3	(0)
- * Club domestic league appearances and goals as of 31 July 2021

Edmundo Iván Vázquez Mellado Pérez (born 14 December 1982) is a former Mexican professional footballer who last played as a goalkeeper.

== Career ==
Vázquez joined Necaxa in 2004, after having played for Correcaminos UAT in the Primera División A. He debuted for the club on August 14, 2004, in a match against Toluca, which his team lost 1–0.

Vázquez became the first player to score a goal in the Copa Mexico, scoring from a free kick against Querétaro F.C.

== Honours ==
Necaxa

- Ascenso MX: Apertura 2009, Bicentenario 2010

Juárez

- Ascenso MX: Apertura 2015

León

- Leagues Cup: 2021
