= Luis Ángel García =

Mexican footballer (born 1984)

Personal information
- Full name: Luis Ángel García Flores
- Date of birth: 11 February 1984 (age 42)
- Place of birth: Monterrey, Nuevo León, Mexico
- Height: 1.70 m (5 ft 7 in)
- Position: Midfielder

Team information
- Current team: Bravos de Nuevo Laredo (Manager)

Senior career*
Years	Team	Apps	(Gls)
2004–2005	Querétaro	32	(2)
2005–2006	UANL	3	(0)
2006–2007	Querétaro	2	(0)
2007–2008	Veracruz	18	(0)
2008	Indios	1	(0)
2009–2010	Atlante José	3	(0)
2010–2012	Veracruz	26	(2)
2012–2013	Tijuana	1	(0)

Managerial career
- 2018–: Bravos de Nuevo Laredo
- * Club domestic league appearances and goals as of 8 July 2012

Luis Ángel García Flores (born 11 February 1984) is a former Mexican professional football player who most recently played for Tijuana.

== Club career ==
García made his debut for UANL Tigres on August 20, 2005, against Club Deportivo Guadalajara. The game ended in a 1–1 tie.

== Honors ==
Tijuana

Liga MX

- Apertura 2012
