= Jesús Palacios =

Mexican footballer (born 1983)

Jesus Palacios
Personal information
- Full name: Jesús Alejandro Palacios Olague
- Date of birth: 7 February 1983 (age 43)
- Place of birth: Monterrey, Mexico
- Position: Midfielder

Senior career*
Years	Team	Apps	(Gls)
2003–2008	UANL	86	(1)
2008	Necaxa	16	(0)
2009–2010	San Luis	41	(3)
2010–2012	Necaxa	8	(1)
2012–2013	La Piedad	14	(1)
2013–2015	Universidad de Guadalajara	32	(5)
2015	Atlético San Luis	2	(1)
2015–2016	Venados	7	(2)

International career
2003	Mexico U-20	2	(0)

Managerial career
- 2017: Tepatitlán (Assistant)
- 2018–2021: Necaxa Reserves and Academy
- 2021–2022: Necaxa (women)
- 2023: Cafetaleros de Chiapas
- 2024–2026: Mazatlán Reserves and Academy
- 2026: Mazatlán (Assistant)
- * Club domestic league appearances and goals as of 31 July 2012

Jesús Alejandro Palacios Olague (Note: In this Spanish name, the first or paternal surname is Palacios and the second or maternal family name is Olague.) (born 7 February 1983) is a retired footballer, who played for Club Universidad de Guadalajara in the Liga MX.

== Career ==
Born in Monterrey, Palacios began his professional football career with local side Tigres UANL, making his Liga MX debut in August 2003. After five years playing for Tigres, Palacios joined rivals Club Necaxa. In December 2008, Necaxa sent him on a six-month loan to San Luis.
