= Carlos Alberto Hurtado =

Mexican footballer (born 1984)

Carlos Alberto Hurtado Arteaga (born January 22, 1984) is a Mexican former professional footballer who played as a midfielder.
