= Orlando Pineda (footballer) =

Mexican footballer (born 1986)

Personal information
- Full name: Orlando Pineda Torres
- Date of birth: 15 February 1986 (age 40)
- Place of birth: Mexico City, Mexico
- Height: 1.70 m (5 ft 7 in)
- Position: Defender

Team information
- Current team: UNAM U-19 (Assistant)

Senior career*
Years	Team	Apps	(Gls)
2008–2017	UNAM	1	(0)
2009–2010	→ Querétaro (loan)	0	(0)
2010–2011	→ Club Leon (loan)	32	(1)
2011	→ Correcaminos UAT (loan)	5	(0)
2012	→ Mérida F.C. (loan)	13	(1)
2012–2013	→ Veracruz (loan)	14	(0)
2014	→ Oaxaca (loan)	16	(0)
2014–2016	→ Atlético San Luis (loan)	43	(1)
2017–2018	→ Oaxaca (loan)	2	(0)

Managerial career
- 2020–2022: UNAM Reserves and Academy
- 2022: Pumas Tabasco (Assistant)
- 2023–: UNAM Reserves and Academy
- * Club domestic league appearances and goals as of January 9, 2018

Orlando Pineda Torres (born 15 February 1986) is a Mexican retired footballer, who last played as a midfielder for Oaxaca on loan from UNAM.

== Club career ==
He previously played for Pumas UNAM (commonly called Pumas) and made 8 appearances for them in the 2008–09 CONCACAF Champions League. He made his sole Primera División de Mexico appearance for the Pumas on 12 October 2008.
