= Roberto Salcedo (footballer) =

Mexican footballer (born 1991)

Personal information
- Full name: Roberto Alejandro Salcedo Reynoso
- Date of birth: 19 December 1991 (age 34)
- Place of birth: Chapala, Jalisco, Mexico
- Height: 1.80 m (5 ft 11 in)
- Position: Goalkeeper

Youth career
- 2007–2009: Chapala F.C.
- 2010–2011: Necaxa

Senior career*
Years	Team	Apps	(Gls)
2011–2018	Necaxa	39	(0)
2018–2020	Atletico San Luis	0	(0)
2020	Halcones de Zapopan	0	(0)
- * Club domestic league appearances and goals

Roberto Alejandro Salcedo Reynoso (born 19 December 1991) is a Mexican former professional footballer.
