= Fernando López (Mexican footballer) =

Mexican footballer (born 1984)

Personal information
- Full name: Fernando López López
- Date of birth: 7 February 1984 (age 42)
- Place of birth: La Piedad, Michoacán, Mexico
- Height: 1.70 m (5 ft 7 in)
- Position: Defender

Senior career*
Years	Team	Apps	(Gls)
2003–2004	Irapuato	36	(0)
2006–2007	Querétano	56	(2)
2008	Atlante	15	(1)
2008–2009	Necaxa	31	(0)
2010	América	10	(0)
2011–2012	Necaxa	6	(0)
2012–2013	→ Dorados (loan)	28	(0)
2013–2014	Necaxa	2	(0)
2016–2017	Bauger		

Managerial career
- 2020–2021: Yalmakán (Liga TDP) (Assistant)
- 2021: Yalmakán (Liga TDP) (Interim)
- 2022: FC San Jose del Arenal (Assistant)
- 2022–2023: La Piedad (Assistant)
- 2023–2024: La Piedad
- * Club domestic league appearances and goals

Fernando López López (born February 7, 1984) is a Mexican former football defender and manager.

== Career ==
Lopez made his debut with Irapuato against Morelia in the Apertura season of 2003 playing 16 games out of 19. He was transferred to Querétaro for a season. Then he was transferred to Atlante and won his first league title. He would be sent to Club Necaxa where he would enjoy success in helping his team reach the quarterfinals, where they would lose to Santos Laguna. Necaxa has confirmed that he is now on loan to Club America and he will play for the 2009–2010 season.

== Honours ==
Atlante

- Mexican Primera División: Apertura 2007
