= Pablo Quatrocchi =

Argentine footballer and manager

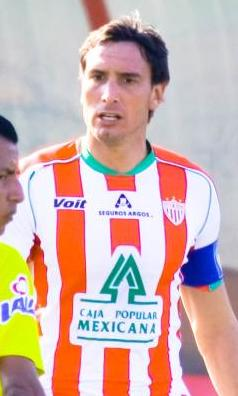

Personal information
- Full name: Pablo Javier Quatrocchi
- Date of birth: 19 January 1974 (age 52)
- Place of birth: Quilmes, Argentina
- Height: 1.89 m (6 ft 2 in)
- Position: Centre back

Team information
- Current team: Defensa y Justicia (reserves manager)

Senior career*
Years	Team	Apps	(Gls)
1994–1996	Quilmes	63	(4)
1996–2002	Estudiantes	211	(20)
2003–2004	VfL Wolfsburg	15	(1)
2004–2006	Veracruz	62	(4)
2006	San Lorenzo	15	(2)
2007–2011	Necaxa	188	(14)
Total		554	(45)

Managerial career
- 2014: Quilmes
- 2015–2016: Douglas Haig
- 2017–2019: Estudiantes (youth)
- 2019: Estudiantes (interim)
- 2019–2023: Estudiantes (reserves)
- 2020–2021: Estudiantes (interim)
- 2022: Estudiantes (interim)
- 2024–: Defensa y Justicia (reserves)
- 2024: Defensa y Justicia (interim)
- 2024: Defensa y Justicia (interim)
- * Club domestic league appearances and goals

Pablo Javier Quatrocchi (born 19 January 1974) is an Argentine football coach and former player who played as a central defender. He is the reserves manager of Defensa y Justicia.

Born in Quilmes, Quatrocchi played for Quilmes, Estudiantes de La Plata, VfL Wolfsburg, Veracruz, San Lorenzo, and finally retired in Club Necaxa as a defender and captain.

== Coaching career ==
After retiring, Quatrocchi was appointed as a youth coach at Quilmes. He was later appointed as the club's sporting director and also served as coordinator of the youth players. On 7 June 2014, it was announced that Quatrocchi has signed his first professional club Quilmes as a head coach and will be making his debut as a first-team coach. He left on 30 November 2014.

On 3 December 2015, he was appointed as manager of Douglas Haig. He was released in May 2016.

In June 2017, Quatrocchi was appointed as a youth coordinator for Estudiantes LP. On 24 February 2019, he was appointed as caretaker manager for the first team. It lasted until March 2019, where Gabriel Milito was appointed.
