= Luis Padilla (footballer, born 1985) =

Mexican footballer (born 1985)

Personal information
- Full name: Luis Alberto Padilla Ponce
- Date of birth: 24 February 1985 (age 41)
- Place of birth: Guadalajara, Jalisco, Mexico
- Height: 1.84 m (6 ft 0 in)
- Position: Centre back

Team information
- Current team: Necaxa U-19 (Assistant)

Youth career
- Necaxa

Senior career*
Years	Team	Apps	(Gls)
2006–2007	Necaxa	6	(0)
2007–2009	→ Sinaloa (loan)	70	(4)
2009–2016	Necaxa	191	(7)
2016–2018	Celaya	59	(3)
2018–2019	Alebrijes	18	(0)

Managerial career
- 2021–: Necaxa Reserves and Academy
- * Club domestic league appearances and goals

Luis Alberto Padilla Ponce (Note: In this Spanish name, the first or paternal surname is Padilla and the second or maternal family name is Ponce.) (born February 24, 1985), is a Mexican former footballer who plays as a midfielder.

== Career ==
Padilla made his professional debut on 11 November 2006 against Veracruz.
