= Everaldo Barbosa =

Brazilian footballer (born 1975)

Personal information
- Full name: Everaldo Vergne de Assis Barbosa
- Date of birth: September 12, 1975 (age 51)
- Place of birth: Salvador, Bahia, Brazil
- Height: 1.76 m (5 ft 9 1/2 in)
- Position: Midfielder

Senior career*
| Years | Team | Apps | (Gls) |
| 1998–1999 | Guarani | | |
| 2001 | Santa Cruz | | |
| 2004–2007 | Jaguares | 101 | (6) |
| 2007–2008 | Necaxa | 65 | (3) |
| 2009 | Veracruz | 18 | (1) |
| 2009–2012 | Necaxa | 89 | (7) |
| 2013 | Catanduvense | 20 | (2) |
| 2013–2015 | Necaxa | 1 | (0) |
- * Club domestic league appearances and goals

Everaldo Vergne de Assis Barbosa (born September 12, 1975) is a Brazilian former football midfielder who currently serves as a technical director for Club Necaxa.

Everaldo has played for Guarani and Santa Cruz in the Campeonato Brasileiro, before moving to Mexico where he played for Chiapas and Necaxa.
