= Altamira F.C. =

Altamira
- Full name: Altamira Fútbol Club
- Nickname: Los Estudiantes (The Students)
- Founded: August 11, 2001
- Dissolved: May 25, 2015
- Ground: Estadio Altamira; Altamira, Tamaulipas, Mexico
- Capacity: 9,581
- Website: http://www.altamirafc.com.mx/
Home colours	Away colours	Third colours

Altamira Fútbol Club or Estudiantes de Altamira (previously known as Estudiantes de Santander) was a Mexican football team based in Altamira, Tamaulipas.

== History ==
On July 12, 2001, the expansion club Estudiantes de Santander announced an open try-out that was attended by hundreds of youths in Tamaulipas, wishing to form part of the club that would begin playing in the Segunda División de México (Second Division). The club was officially founded on August 11, 2001. During the 2004–05 season, the club was promoted to the Primera División 'A' de México (now renamed the Liga de Ascenso de México), where they became a farm team to San Luis and later, Pumas UNAM. However, their stay in the Primera A was only short-lived, and they were eventually relegated back to the Segunda División after the Clausura 2005 tournament.

In 2006, the team changed its name to Estudiantes de Altamira.

It was almost five years before Altamira returned to the Liga de Ascenso in 2010. This was because the teams that reached the Segunda División championship that year (Universidad del Fútbol and Chivas Rayadas, respectively) did not have the right to be promoted. So, Estudiantes de Altamira took their place.

== Disappearance ==
After unsuccessful seasons in the Ascenso MX, on May 25, 2015, Altamira was moved to Tapachula, Chiapas and changed its franchise to Cafetaleros de Tapachula after facing economic struggles due to their low attendance, which was later moved to Tuxtla Gutiérrez on May 28, 2019, and changed its franchise to Cafetaleros de Chiapas.

== Team crest and colors ==
The team crest represents the important resources in and around the port city of Altamira (the anchor, the ship, and the factories). In the foreground, there is a ship's steering wheel. The navy blue and white colors symbolize the waters of the Gulf of Mexico.

== Notable players ==
- (Argentina) Esteban Alberto González
- (Brazil) Patrick da Silva
- (Brazil) Juliano de Andrade
- (Brazil) Lucas Silva
- (Brazil) William
- (Chile) Nelson San Martín
- (Honduras) Jairo Martínez
- (Mexico) David Toledo
- (Mexico) Héctor del Ángel
- (Mexico) Horacio Sánchez
- (Mexico) Pedro Solís
- (Mexico) Franz Torres
- (Haiti) Sony Norde
- (Mexico) Jonathan Jáuregui
