= Paulo Chávez =

Mexican footballer (born 1976)

Paulo Cesar Chavez
Personal information
- Full name: Paulo Cesar Chavez Quirarte
- Date of birth: 7 January 1976 (age 50)
- Place of birth: Guadalajara, Jalisco, Mexico
- Height: 1.76 m (5 ft 9 in)
- Position: Midfielder

Senior career*
Years	Team	Apps	(Gls)
1993–2000	Guadalajara	119	(27)
2000–2004	Monterrey	68	(29)
2004–2005	Toluca	26	(0)
2005	Guadalajara	7	(2)
2006–2007	Morelia	10	(0)
2007–2008	Tapatio	40	(9)
2008–2009	Veracruz	11	(0)
2009	León	16	(0)
2009–2011	Club Necaxa	62	(4)
2011–2012	Irapuato	16	(2)
2012	Dorados de Sinaloa	14	(0)

International career
1997–2000	Mexico	30	(2)

Managerial career
- 2013–2014: Tijuana Reserves and Academy
- 2020–2021: CAFESSA Tlajomulco
- 2021: Guadalajara Reserves and Academy
- 2021–2022: Guadalajara (Assistant)
- 2022–2023: Tapatío (Assistant)
Medal record
Representing Mexico
Third place	Copa America	1997
Third place	Copa America	1999
- * Club domestic league appearances and goals

Paulo Cesar "Tilon" Chavez Quirarte (born 7 January 1976) is a Mexican former footballer who played as a midfielder.

He is the father of professional footballer Mateo Chávez.

== Club career ==
=== Guadalajara ===
Chavez debuted with Guadalajara on December 12, 1993, against Puebla F.C. where Chivas won 2–0. Since his debut, he started every single game for Chivas. He helped Chivas win the cup in Verano 1997 by scoring one of the six goals against Toros Neza. Chavez made his third stint with the club by participating in the SuperLiga. He recently stated that he only wants to play for the senior team only.

=== Other Mexican Clubs ===
In 2000, Chavez was transferred to CF Monterrey. He was a key player as he once was with Chivas. He would go on to play all of their games. In 2004, he would be transferred to CD Toluca where he saw little playing time. In 2005, Chavez would return to Chivas for the tournament Apertura 2005. Having little participation, he would register to play with CD Tapatio. In the tournament Apertura 2006, he would play for Monarcas Morelia with 707 minutes in 10 games. On January 3, 2007, he would return to CD Tapatio. In 2009, he joins Club Necaxa in the Liga de Ascenso and obtains the bi-campeonato with the team after scoring a goal against Leon in the final. He was a big part in Necaxa going back to the first division.

== National career ==
Chavez was a huge part of Mexico national team. He Represented his country in Copa America 1999. Unfortunately a very hard decision from Manuel Lapuente would leave him and David Oteo out the 1998 FIFA World Cup. In total he has made 30 appearances for the Mexican team.

=== Doping Scandal ===
During the 1999 Copa América both Chavez and Raúl Lara failed drug tests for doping with Nandrolone and testosterone/Epitestosterone, respectively. They received a 6-month ban from CONMEBOL and could not participate in the tournament, leaving the Mexican team with only 22 players. After threats to boycott the 1999 FIFA Confederations Cup the ban was appealed, and FIFA ruled in favor of lifting the ban, citing that the laboratory where the tests were conducted was not certified by them or the IOC.

== Career statistics ==
=== International goals ===
No.	Date	Venue	Opponent	Score	Result	Competition	Ref.
1.	November 9, 1997	Mexico City, Mexico	Costa Rica	3–3	Draw	1998 FIFA World Cup qualification	
2.	June 9, 1999	Chicago, United States	Argentina	2–2	Draw	Friendly	

== Titles ==
Guadalajara

- Mexican Primera División: Verano 1997

Monterey

- Mexican Primera División: Clausura 2003
