= Estadio León =

Football stadium in León, Guanajuato, Mexico, home venue for León FC

Coordinates: 21°6′56″N 101°39′28″W

- Nou Camp
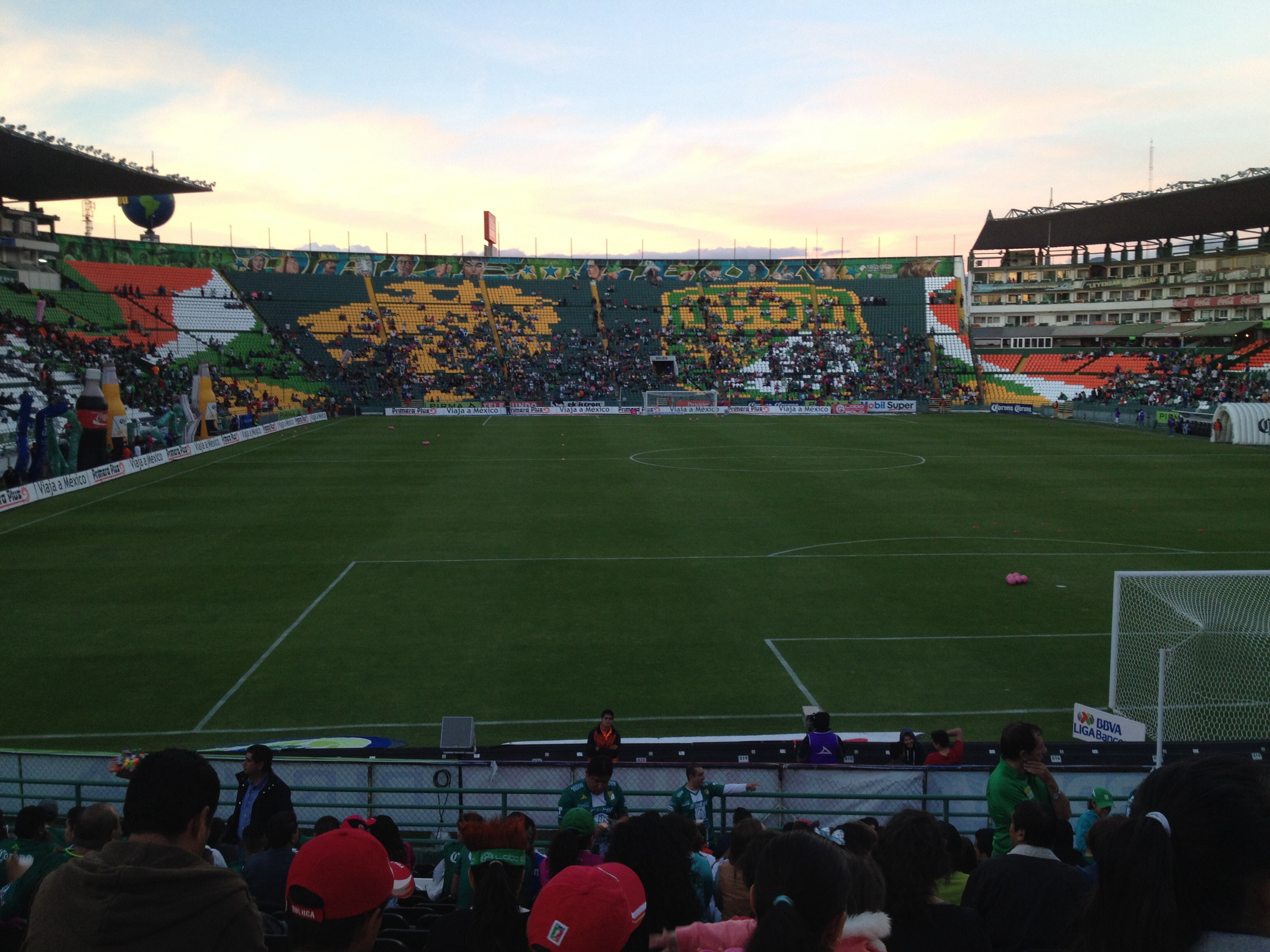
- Interactive map of Estadio León
- Location: León, Guanajuato
- Owner: Grupo Pachuca
- Capacity: 31,297
- Surface: Grass
- Field size: 105 m × 68 m (344 ft × 223 ft)

Construction
- Opened: 1 March 1967
- Cost: $12,500,000 (1960's)
- Architect: Constructora ARVA S.A. de C.V

Tenants
- León (1967–present); Union de Curtidores (2013–2014)

The Estadio León, unofficially known as Nou Camp, is a mid-sized football stadium with a seating capacity of 31,297 built in 1967, and located in the city of León, Guanajuato, in the Bajío region of central Mexico. It is the home of Liga MX club León.

== History ==
The construction of the stadium commenced in August 1965 and was finalized by the end of 1966. The official inauguration took place on February 1, 1967, with a match between Santos and River Plate. Santos won the match 2–1.

The stadium boasts a distinguished history as an international sporting venue, having hosted the football tournament at the 1968 Summer Olympics and serving as a key site for two FIFA World Cups. During the 1970 FIFA World Cup, it welcomed national sides including West Germany, Peru, Bulgaria, and Morocco, and was the setting for the highly anticipated quarter-final between West Germany and England. The stadium once again took center stage at the 1986 FIFA World Cup, hosting matches featuring the Soviet Union, France, Hungary, and Canada, along with a second-round fixture between the USSR and Belgium.

On March 8, 2017, following a protracted period of legal disputes, a resolution was reached determining that the Estadio León was the property of the former Club León owners, Zermeño Reyes and Héctor González.

On June 18, 2018, Grupo Pachuca unveiled the new stadium project, dubbed the Nuevo Estadio León. It was projected to have a capacity of 35,000 spectators and was scheduled for completion in 2023.

On October 9, 2020, Club León left the stadium following a ruling on the transfer of ownership. Consequently, the club decided to play the remainder of the season at Estadio Victoria, home of Club Necaxa. Club León returned to the stadium after one match.

On July 15, 2021, Grupo Pachuca announced that they had reached an agreement to purchase Estadio León. It was later revealed that the local government had financed the deal.

On September 15, 2023, Grupo Pachuca announced the cancellation of the new stadium project. The decision was made due to the inability to carry out the project. Instead, the Estadio León will undergo renovations.

== 1970 FIFA World Cup ==
Date	Time	Team #1	Res.	Team #2	Round	Attendance
2 June 1970	16:00	Peru	3–2	Bulgaria	Group 4	13,765
3 June 1970	16:00	West Germany	2–1	Morocco	Group 4	12,942
6 June 1970	16:00	Peru	3–0	Morocco	Group 4	13,537
7 June 1970	12:00	West Germany	5–2	Bulgaria	Group 4	12,710
10 June 1970	16:00	West Germany	3–1	Peru	Group 4	17,875
11 June 1970	16:00	Bulgaria	1–1	Morocco	Group 4	12,299
14 June 1970	12:00	West Germany	3–2 (a. e. t.)	England	Quarter-finals	23,357

== 1986 FIFA World Cup ==
Date	Time	Team #1	Res.	Team #2	Round	Attendance
1 June 1986	16:00	Canada	0–1	France	Group C	36,000
5 June 1986	12:00	France	1–1	Soviet Union	Group C	36,540
9 June 1986	12:00	Hungary	0–3	France	Group C	31,420
15 June 1986	16:00	Soviet Union	3–4 (a. e. t.)	Belgium	Round of 16	32,277
