= Mauricio Romero (Mexican footballer) =

Mexican footballer (born 1983)

Mauricio Romero Alvizu (born February 2, 1983, in León, Guanajuato) is a Mexican former footballer.

== Career ==
Romero has played for several teams including Monarcas Morelia, Tigres UANL, Querétaro F.C., Atlante F.C. and Tiburones Rojos de Veracruz. He is well known for his outstanding performance in the Primera Division A with giants as Club Necaxa and Club Leon having scored more than 40 goals in just 4 tournaments.

Romero led Veracruz to the 2010 Primera A playoffs, but missed out on the final match against Club Tijuana through injury.

== Statistics ==
| Info. | Atlas | Atlante |
|---|---|---|
| Weight-73 kg. | Debut-Aug.21, 2004. | Debut-March 9, 2008 |
| Height-1.80m | Goals-6 | Goals-1 |
