= Carlos Casartelli =

Argentine footballer (born 1974)

Personal information
- Full name: Carlos D. Casartelli Torregrosa
- Date of birth: November 4, 1974 (age 51)
- Place of birth: Villa Ángela, Argentina
- Height: 1.80 m (5 ft 11 in)
- Position: Striker

Senior career*
Years	Team	Apps	(Gls)
1994–1995	Deportivo Mandiyú	14	(0)
1995–1996	Independiente	9	(1)
1996–1997	Gimnasia de Jujuy	54	(11)
1998–1999	UD Salamanca	30	(5)
1999	RCD Espanyol	5	(0)
2000	Estudiantes	17	(3)
2000–2001	Atlante	28	(8)
2001–2003	Veracruz	73	(24)
2003	Correcaminos UAT	11	(9)
2004	Querétaro	36	(26)
2005	Monterrey	36	(13)
2006	Tecos UAG	31	(3)
2006–2007	Dorados de Sinaloa	22	(18)
2007	Tecos UAG	12	(3)
2008	Indios	16	(2)
2010	León	20	(13)
2010	Mérida	15	(1)
- * Club domestic league appearances and goals

Carlos Casartelli (born 4 November 1974, in Villa Ángela) is an Argentine former professional footballer.

Casartelli made his professional debut for Deportivo Mandiyú in 1994. He played for a number of clubs in Mexico between 2000 and 2008 before returning to Argentina to play for Club Atlético Huracán, he was released in 2008.

His brother Fernando Casartelli is also a footballer.
