= Juan Carlos Mosqueda =

Mexican footballer (born 1985)

Personal information
- Full name: Juan Carlos Mosqueda Andrade
- Date of birth: 17 April 1985 (age 41)
- Place of birth: Mexico City, Mexico
- Height: 1.67 m (5 ft 5 1/2 in)
- Position: Midfielder

Senior career*
Years	Team	Apps	(Gls)
2006–2008	América	104	(6)
2008–2009	Santos Laguna	17	(2)
2009–2017	Necaxa	100	(4)
2013	→ Mérida (loan)	31	(4)
2014–2015	→ Lobos BUAP (loan)	16	(0)
2017	→ Veracruz (loan)	2	(0)
- * Club domestic league appearances and goals

Juan Carlos Mosqueda Andrade (born 17 April 1985), also known as El More, is a Mexican former footballer.

A centre midfielder, Mosqueda received the opportunity to break into the first team squad at América on August 13, 2006 - in a game against UANL played at América's home ground, the mythical Azteca.

The exodus of experienced midfielders from Club América following the Clausura 2006 season prompted Águilas' manager Luis Fernando Tena to dig into the youth squads for possible replacements coming into the Apertura 2006 season. Following a 0–1 victory at San Luis in Week 1 of the season in which the lack of offensive creation in the midfield was evident, the 21-year-old Mosqueda was given the chance to debut the following week, subbing for Fabián Peña at the beginning of the second half. Later that game, with four minutes remaining and América trailing 0–1 in their inaugural home game for the Apertura 2006 season - Mosqueda fired a scorcher into the upper right corner of the goal defended by Edgar Hernández. The spectacular goal gave his team the draw and cemented a dream debut.

In December 2008 he went on loan to Santos Laguna. In December 2009 he went on loan to Club Necaxa.

== Honours ==
Individual

- Mexican Primera División Best Rookie: Apertura 2006
