= 2011–12 Querétaro F.C. season =

Querétaro
2011–12 season
- Chairman: Ulises Zurita
- Manager: Gustavo Matosas (Nov. 2010 – Aug. 2011); José Cardozo (Aug. 2011–March 5, 2012); Ángel Comizzo (from March 2012)
- Stadium: Estadio Corregidora
- Apertura 2011: 8th Final Phase Quarter-finals
- Top goalscorer: League: Apertura: Carlos Bueno (12); Clausura: Isaac Romo (4); All: Carlos Bueno (12)
| Home colours | Away colours | Third colours |

The 2011–12 Querétaro season was the 65th professional season of Mexico's top-flight football league. The season is split into two tournaments—the Torneo Apertura and the Torneo Clausura—each with identical formats and each contested by the same eighteen teams. Querétaro began their season on July 24, 2011, against América, Querétaro play their homes games on Saturdays at 5:00pm local time.

== Torneo Apertura ==
=== Squad ===
Note: Flags indicate national team as defined under FIFA eligibility rules; some limited exceptions apply. Players may hold more than one non-FIFA nationality.

| No. | Pos. | Nation | Player |
|---|---|---|---|
| 1 | GK | MEX | Liborio Sánchez |
| 2 | DF | COL | Efraín Cortés |
| 3 | DF | MEX | Juan Antonio Ocampo |
| 4 | DF | MEX | Diego García |
| 5 | MF | MEX | Israel López |
| 6 | FW | MEX | Mitchel Oviedo |
| 7 | FW | MEX | Adolfo Bautista |
| 8 | MF | MEX | Israel Martínez |
| 9 | FW | MEX | Michel Vázquez |
| 11 | MF | MEX | Jorge Ibarra |
| 12 | FW | MEX | Daniel Alanís |
| 14 | DF | MEX | Raúl Rico |
| 15 | DF | MEX | Manuel López Mondragón |

| No. | Pos. | Nation | Player |
|---|---|---|---|
| 16 | MF | MEX | Sergio Amaury Ponce |
| 17 | MF | MEX | Hibert Ruíz |
| 18 | FW | MEX | Pablo Bonells |
| 19 | DF | MEX | Adrián García Arías |
| 20 | FW | URU | Carlos Bueno (captain) |
| 21 | MF | MEX | Marco Antonio Jiménez |
| 22 | FW | ARG | Franco Niell |
| 23 | DF | MEX | Daniel Valdez |
| 24 | MF | MEX | Emilio López |
| 25 | FW | COL | Daley Mena |
| 27 | DF | MEX | Christian Pérez |
| 28 | MF | MEX | Diego Andrade |
| 31 | DF | URU | Maximiliano Arias |

=== Regular season ===
Win Draw Loss

==== Apertura 2011 results ====
| July 24, 2011 Round 1 | América | 2–1 | Querétaro | Estadio Azteca, Mexico City |
| 16:00 | Cortés 28' (o.g.); Benítez 43'; Pimantel (yellow card) 69' | Report | Vásquez (yellow card) 21'; Pineda (yellow card) 49'; Mondragón (yellow card) 63'; Bueno (yellow card) 71'; García Arias (yellow card) 79'; Niell 90+3' | Referee: Antony Zanjuampa |

| July 30, 2011 Round 2 | Querétaro | 0–0 | UANL | Estadio Corregidora, Querétaro |
| 17:00 | Ruiz (yellow card) 46'; Neill (yellow card) 90+3' | | Ayala (yellow card) 24'; Toledo (yellow card) 89' | Referee: Juan Genaro Medrano |

| August 3, 2011 Round 3 | Atlas | 3–0 | Querétaro | Estadio Jalisco, Guadalajara |
| 20:45 | Torres (yellow card) 34', (goal) 40', 80'; Lacerda (yellow card) 35'; Welcome (yellow card) 51'; Pinto (yellow card) 52'; Romero 88'; Vidrio (yellow card) 90' | Report | Mondragón (yellow card) 34'; Bueno (yellow card) 43'; Sánchez (yellow card) 60'; Mena (yellow card) 90' | Referee: Miguel Ángel Ortega |

| August 6, 2011 Round 4 | Querétaro | 2–1 | Pachuca | Estadio Corregidora, Querétaro |
| 17:00 | Mondragón (yellow card) 52'; Martínez (yellow card) 62'; Mena 75'; Vázquez 90+4', (yellow card) 90+5' | Report | Hernández 14', (yellow card) 90+3'; Herrera (yellow card) 36' | Referee: Ricardo Arellano |

| August 13, 2011 Round 5 | Atlante | 1–3 | Querétaro | Estadio Quintana Roo, Cancún |
| 21:00 | Venegas (yellow card) 8'; Maldonado 58'; Torres (yellow card) 66' | Report | Pérez (yellow card) 15'; Bueno 30', 68'; I. López (yellow card) 61'; Vázquez 74' | Referee: Roberto García Orozco |

| August 20, 2011 Round 6 | Querétaro | 1–2 | Chiapas | Estadio Corregidora, Querétaro |
| 17:00 | Vázquez (yellow card) 17'; Bueno (yellow card) 21', (goal) 73' | Report | Hernández (yellow card) 21'; Pérez 53' (o.g.); Rey 56' | Referee: Fernando Guerrero |

| August 28, 2011 Round 7 | Tijuana | 1–1 | Querétaro | Estadio Caliente, Tijuana |
| 12:00 | Moreno (yellow card) 9', (goal) 39'; Molina (yellow card) 19' | Report | Mena (yellow card) 23'; Martínez 33', (yellow card) 38'} Bueno (yellow card) 38' | Referee: Jorge Eduardo Gasso |

| September 10, 2011 Round 8 | Querétaro | 4–0 | UNAM | Estadio Corregidora, Querétaro |
| 17:00 | Bueno 38', 44' (pen.), 56'; Martínez (red card) 50'; Niell 63' | Report | Espinzoa (red card) 50'; Cortés (yellow card) 60'; Velarde (yellow card) 75' | Referee: Francisco Chacón |

| September 18, 2011 Round 9 | Morelia | 4–2 | Querétaro | Estadio Morelos, Morelia |
| 18:00 | Sanah 17', 42', 89', (yellow card) 90'; Lozano 27'; Gastélum (yellow card) 47'; Ramírez (yellow card) 71' | Report | Bueno (yellow card) 18', (goal) 32' (pen.); Mena (yellow card) 63'; Niell 79'; Mondragón (yellow card) 85' | Referee: Miguel Ángel Flores |

| September 24, 2011 Round 10 | Querétaro | 2–1 | Monterrey | Estadio Corregidora, Querétaro |
| 17:00 | Mena 34'; Jiménez (yellow card) 35'; Bueno 59'; Mondragón (red card) 86' | Report | Bastanta (yellow card) 22'; Chávez (yellow card) 49'; S. Pérez (yellow card) 62' (yellow-red card) 64'; Suazo 74' (pen.); Osorio (yellow card) 83'; Mier (red card) 86' | Referee: Miguel Ángel Ayala |

| October 1, 2011 Round 11 | Guadalajara | 0–1 | Querétaro | Estadio Jalisco, Guadalajara |
| 19:00 | de Luna (yellow card) 79'; Fierro (yellow card) 90+1'; Nava (yellow card) 90+2' | Report | Ruiz 6'; Bueno (yellow card) 11'; Ocampo (yellow card) 24'; Cortés (yellow card) 27' | Referee: Mauricio Morales |

| October 8, 2011 Round 12 | Querétaro | 1–3 | Santos Laguna | Estadio Corregidora, Querétaro |
| 17:00 | Martínez (yellow card) 19'; Vázquez 25' (pen.) | | Quintero 7'; Peralta 8'; Morales 63'; Hoyos (yellow card) 65'; Mares (yellow card) 75' | Referee: Roberto García Orozco |

| October 16, 2011 Round 13 | Puebla | 1–0 | Querétaro | Estadio Cuauhtémoc, Puebla |
| 12:00 | Riascos (yellow card) 55' (yellow-red card) 59', (goal) 58'; Pereyra (red card) 74'; Zamora (yellow card) 81' | Report | Rico (yellow card) 16'; Bueno (yellow card) 36' | Referee: Paul Delgadillo |

| October 22, 2011 Round 14 | Querétaro | 1–0 | Cruz Azul | Estadio Corregidora, Querétaro |
| 17:00 | Rico (red card) 81'; Bueno 86' (pen.) | Report | Giménez (yellow card) 14'; Villaluz (yellow card) 63'; Orozco (red card) 66'; Villa (yellow card) 72'; Domínguez (yellow card) 85' | Referee: Francisco Chacón |

| October 26, 2011 Round 15 | San Luis | 2–1 | Querétaro | Estadio Alfonso Lastras, San Luis Potosí |
| 20:30 | Orozco (yellow card) 5'; I. Torres (yellow card) 56'; Moreno 57', 72'; Velasco (yellow card) 67' | Report | Bueno (yellow card) 5', (goal) 81' (pen.); Ponce (yellow card) 55'; Jiménez (yellow card) 66'; Mondragón (yellow card) 75' | Referee: Marco Antonio Rodríguez |

| October 30, 2011 Round 16 | Toluca | 0–1 | Querétaro | Estadio Nemesio Díez, Toluca |
| 12:00 | | Report | Martínez 24'; Sánchez (yellow card) 62' | Referee: Roberto García Orozco |

| November 5, 2011 Round 17 | Querétaro | 3–0 | Estudiantes Tecos | Estadio Corregidora, Querétaro |
| 17:00 | Rico (yellow card) 11'; Martínez (yellow card) 59', (goal) 68'; Bautista 62'; Bueno (yellow card) 70'; Ponce 82' | Report | Bovaglio (yellow card) 24'; Leaño (yellow card) 31'; Zamongilny (yellow card) 69'; Alatorre (yellow card) 79' | Referee: Erim Ramírez |

=== Final phase ===
| November 19, 2011 Quarter-finals | Querétaro | 2–1 | Guadalajara | Estadio Corregidora, Querétaro |
| 17:00 | Bueno 9', 59'; Bautista (yellow card) 49'; Rico (yellow card) 58'; López (yellow card) 68' | Report | Sánchez (yellow card) 21'; Torres (yellow card) 56'; Enríquez 90+2' | Referee: Fernando Guerrero |

| November 26, 2011 Quarter-finals | Guadalajara | 0–0 | Querétaro | Estadio Omnilife, Zapopan |
| 19:00 | Reynoso (yellow card) 20'; Fabián (yellow card) 45' | Report | Ponce (yellow card) 1'; López (yellow card) 20'; Martínez (yellow card) 38'; Rico (yellow card) 52'; Sánchez (yellow card) 83' | Referee: Mauricio Morales |

Querétaro advanced 2–1 on aggregate

| December 1, 2011 Semi-finals | Querétaro | 0–0 | UANL | Estadio Corregidora, Querétaro |
| 17:00 | M. Jiménez (yellow card) 22'; Bueno (yellow card) 34'; López Mondragón (yellow card) 70' | Report | I. Jiménez (yellow card) 45'; Torres Nilo (yellow card) 49'; Mancilla (yellow card) 53' | Referee: Roberto García |

| December 4, 2011 Semi-finals | UANL | 1–0 | Querétaro | Estadio Universitario, San Nicolás |
| 19:00 | Mancilla (yellow card) 36'; Lobos (yellow card) 41'; López Mondragón 44' (o.g.) | Report | Ruíz (yellow card) 11'; M. Jiménez (yellow card) 42'; García Arías (yellow card) 77'; Rico (yellow card) 83'; Vázquez (red card) 90+3' | Referee: Francisco Chacón |

UANL advanced 1–0 on aggregate

=== Goalscorers ===
| Position | Nation | Name | Goals scored |
|---|---|---|---|
| 1 | (Uruguay) | Carlos Bueno | 12 |
| 2 | (Mexico) | Israel Martínez | 3 |
| 2 | (Argentina) | Franco Niell | 3 |
| 2 | (Mexico) | Michel Vázquez | 3 |
| 5 | (Colombia) | Daley Mena | 2 |
| 6 | (Mexico) | Adolfo Bautista | 1 |
| 6 | (Mexico) | Sergio Amaury Ponce | 1 |
| 6 | (Mexico) | Hibert Ruíz | 1 |
| TOTAL | | | 26 |

=== Results ===
==== Results summary ====
| Overall | | | | | | | | Home | | | | | | Away | | | | | |
| Pld | W | D | L | GF | GA | GD | Pts | W | D | L | GF | GA | GD | W | D | L | GF | GA | GD |
|---|---|---|---|---|---|---|---|---|---|---|---|---|---|---|---|---|---|---|---|
| 17 | 8 | 2 | 7 | 24 | 21 | +3 | 26 | 5 | 1 | 2 | 14 | 7 | +7 | 3 | 1 | 5 | 10 | 14 | −4 |

Last updated: 5 November 2011.
Source: Apertura 2011 results

==== Results by round ====
| Round | 1 | 2 | 3 | 4 | 5 | 6 | 7 | 8 | 9 | 10 | 11 | 12 | 13 | 14 | 15 | 16 | 17 |
|---|---|---|---|---|---|---|---|---|---|---|---|---|---|---|---|---|---|
| Ground | A | H | A | H | A | H | A | H | A | H | A | H | A | H | A | A | H |
| Result | L | D | L | W | W | L | D | W | L | W | W | L | L | W | L | W | W |
| Position | 13 | 12 | 16 | 11 | 8 | 12 | 12 | 6 | 13 | 8 | 7 | 9 | 11 | 8 | 9 | 9 | 8 |

Updated to match(es) played on 6 November 2011. Source: Apertura 2011 results and mediotiempo.com
A = Away; H = Home; W = Win; D = Draw; L = Loss

== Transfers ==
=== In ===
| # | Pos | Nat | Player | Age | From | Date | Notes |

=== Out ===
| # | Pos | Nat | Player | Age | To | Date | Notes |
|---|---|---|---|---|---|---|---|
| 17 | MF | (Mexico) | Hibert Ruíz | 24 | Jaguares | December 20, 2011 | |

== Torneo Clausura ==
=== Squad ===
Note: Flags indicate national team as defined under FIFA eligibility rules; some limited exceptions apply. Players may hold more than one non-FIFA nationality.

| No. | Pos. | Nation | Player |
|---|---|---|---|
| 1 | GK | MEX | Liborio Sánchez |
| 2 | DF | COL | Efraín Cortés |
| 3 | DF | MEX | Juan Antonio Ocampo |
| 4 | DF | MEX | Diego García |
| 5 | MF | MEX | Israel López |
| 6 | MF | MEX | Mitchel Oviedo |
| 8 | DF | MEX | Israel Martínez |
| 9 | FW | MEX | Isaac Romo |
| 10 | MF | ARG | Pablo Vitti |
| 11 | MF | MEX | Jorge Ibarra |
| 12 | FW | MEX | Óscar Alanís |
| 14 | DF | MEX | Raúl Rico (Captain) |
| 15 | DF | MEX | Manuel López Mondragón |
| 16 | MF | MEX | Amaury Ponce |
| 17 | MF | CHI | José Pérez |

| No. | Pos. | Nation | Player |
|---|---|---|---|
| 19 | DF | MEX | Adrían García Arías (captain) |
| 20 | FW | ARG | Germán Alemanno |
| 21 | MF | MEX | Marco Antonio |
| 23 | DF | MEX | Daniel Valdez |
| 24 | MF | MEX | Emilio López |
| 25 | MF | COL | Daley Mena |
| 26 | FW | MEX | Francisco Valdés Pani |
| 27 | DF | MEX | Christian Pérez |
| 28 | MF | MEX | Diego Andrade |
| 29 | FW | MEX | Edgardo Romero |
| 30 | DF | MEX | Alessandro Luna |
| 32 | MF | MEX | Onay Pineda |
| 34 | GK | MEX | Darío Romo |
| 35 | GK | MEX | Sergio García |

=== Regular season ===
Win Draw Loss

==== Clausura 2012 results ====
| January 7, 2012 Round 1 | Querétaro | 0–2 | América | Estadio Corregidora, Querétaro |
| 17:00 | | Report | Valenzuela (yellow card) 6'; Benítez 70'; Reyes (yellow card) 82'; Medina 90+2' | Referee: Jorge Antonio Pérez |

| January 14, 2012 Round 2 | UANL | 1–0 | Querétaro | Estadio Universitario, San Nicolás |
| 19:00 | Salcido (yellow card) 35'; Juninho 40'; Mancilla (yellow card) 45+'; Acuña (yellow card) 45+' | Report | Jiménez (yellow card) 45+'; García (yellow card) 60'; Garcia Arias (yellow card) 61' | Referee: Fernando Guerrero |

| January 21, 2012 Round 3 | Querétaro | 2–1 | Atlas | Estadio Corregidora, Querétaro |
| 17:00 | Romo 18'; Mondragón (yellow card) 21'; López (yellow card) 22'; Ponce 35'; Vitti (yellow card) 44'; Pérez (yellow card) 61' | Report | Rodríguez (yellow card) 34'; Ayala (yellow card) 40'; Torres (yellow card) 59'; Santos (yellow card) 78'; Zamora (red card) 80'; Maldonado 90' | Referee: Miguel Ángel Ortega |

| January 28, 2012 Round 4 | Pachuca | 1–1 | Querétaro | Estadio Hidalgo, Pachuca |
| 19:00 | Ayoví 51'; Herrera (yellow card) 52' (yellow-red card) 55'; Borja (yellow card) 63' | Report | Vitti 26'; Ponce (yellow card) 30'; Jiménez (yellow card) 63'; Ferrada (yellow card) 73' | Referee: Ricardo Arellano |

| February 4, 2012 Round 5 | Querétaro | 2–3 | Atlante | Estadio Corregidora, Querétaro |
| 17:00 | Vitti (yellow card) 41', (goal) 57'; Alemanno 47'; Zamarripa (yellow card) 90' | Report | Vera (yellow card) 33'; Guerrero (yellow card) 36'; Martínez 48', 90+1'; Cuevas 66' | Referee: Erim Ramírez |

| February 11, 2012 Round 6 | Chiapas | 3–0 | Querétaro | Estadio Victor Manuel Reyna, Tuxtla Gutiérrez |
| 17:00 | Martínez 8', 88'; Andrade (yellow card) 76'; Arizala 83', (yellow card) 90+3' | Report | Alemanno (red card) 58'; Jiménez (yellow card) 62'; Mondragón (yellow card) 71'; García Arias (yellow card) 90+1' | Referee: Francisco Chacón |

| February 18, 2012 Round 7 | Querétaro | 0–2 | Tijuana | Estadio Corregidora, Querétaro |
| 17:00 | Pérez (yellow card) 48'; Sánchez (yellow card) 53' | Report | Sand 50', (yellow card) 66'; Riascos 54'; Arce (yellow card) 55'; Castillo (yellow card) 57'; Corona (yellow card) 67' | Referee: Jorge Eduardo Gasso |

| February 26, 2012 Round 8 | UNAM | 1–1 | Querétaro | Estadio Olímpico Universitario, Mexico City |
| 12:00 | Cacho 13'; Cortés (yellow card) 37' | Report | Ponce 47' | Referee: Miguel Ángel Ayala |

| March 3, 2012 Round 9 | Querétaro | 0–3 | Morelia | Estadio Corregidora, Querétaro |
| 20:10 | Martínez (yellow card) 19'; Sánchez (yellow card) 90+2'; Cortés (yellow card) 90+3' | Report | Márquez 10'; Sabah 17'; Aldrete (yellow card) 22'; Sandoval (yellow card) 34'; Lugo 51' | Referee: Jorge Macias Romo |

| March 10, 2012 Round 10 | Monterrey | 4–1 | Querétaro | Estadio Tecnológico, Monterrey |
| 17:00 | Chávez 50', (yellow card) 73' de Nigris 56', 89'; Delgado 61'; Reyna (yellow card) 62'; Meza (yellow card) 85' | Report | Rico (yellow card) 56'; Jiménez (yellow card) 63'; Romo 83' | Referee: Marco Antonio Rodríguez |

| March 17, 2012 Round 11 | Querétaro | 0–0 | Guadalajara | Estadio Corregidora, Querétaro |
| 17:00 | Mondragón (yellow card) 23'; Pérez (yellow card) 26'; Romo (yellow card) 26'; Alemanno (yellow card) 33'; Garcia Arias (yellow card) 83' | Report | Magallón (yellow card) 19'; Araujo (yellow card) 30'; Álvarez (yellow card) 35'; Fierro (yellow card) 75'; Mejia (yellow card) 90+2' | Referee: Fabricio Morales |

| March 24, 2012 Round 12 | Santos Laguna | 2–0 | Querétaro | Estadio TSM Corona, Torreón |
| 19:00 | Rodríguez 28' (pen.); Baloy (yellow card) 34'; Gómez 75' | Report | Martínez (yellow card) 7' (yellow-red card) 48'; García Arias (yellow card) 26' (red card) 29' | Referee: Erim Ramírez |

| March 31, 2012 Round 13 | Querétaro | 0–1 | Puebla | Estadio Corregidora, Querétaro |
| 17:00 | López 42'; Cortés (yellow card) 83'; López (yellow card) 86'; Oviedo (yellow card) 90' | Report | Zamora (yellow card) 35'; Durán (yellow card) 65'; Silva 68' | Referee: José Alfredo Peñaloza |

| April 8, 2012 Round 14 | Cruz Azul | 1–2 | Querétaro | Estadio Azul, Mexico City |
| 18:00 | Perea 46' | Report | Cortés (yellow card) 42', (goal) 90+1'; Comizzo (manager) (red card) 81'; Romo 85'; Mena (yellow card) 89' | Referee: Roberto García Orozco |

| April 14, 2012 Round 15 | Querétaro | 2–2 | San Luis | Estadio Corregidora, Querétaro |
| 17:00 | López (yellow card) 30'; Romo 47'; García 87' | Report | Aguirre (yellow card) 33'; Moreno 40'; Chiapas (yellow card) 76'; Pereyra 83'; Alcántar (yellow card) 90+1' | Referee: Francisco Chacón |

| April 21, 2012 Round 16 | Querétaro | 2–2 | Toluca | Estadio Corregidora, Querétaro |
| 17:00 | Pérez (yellow card) 24'; Martínez 29', (yellow card) 65'; Oviedo 34'; García (yellow card) 72' | Report | Cruzalta (yellow card) 67'; Alonso 54', 61', (yellow card) 70' | Referee: Antony Zanjuampa |

| April 27, 2012 Round 17 | Estudiantes Tecos | 1–1 | Querétaro | Estadio Tres de Marzo, Zapopan |
| 20:10 | Sambueza (yellow card) 26'; Luna 63' | Report | Pérez (yellow card) 33', (goal) 80'; García Arías (yellow card) 35'; Romo (yellow card) 90' | Referee: Jorge Antonio Pérez |

Querétaro did not qualify to the Final Phase

=== Goalscorers ===
| Position | Nation | Name | Goals scored |
|---|---|---|---|
| 1. | (Mexico) | Isaac Romo | 4 |
| 2. | (Mexico) | Sergio Amaury Ponce | 2 |
| 2. | (Argentina) | Pablo Vitti | 2 |
| 4. | (Argentina) | Germán Alemanno | 1 |
| 4. | (Mexico) | Alberto García Carpizo | 1 |
| 4. | (Colombia) | Efraín Cortés | 1 |
| 4. | (Mexico) | Israel Martínez | 1 |
| 4. | (Mexico) | Mitchel Oviedo | 1 |
| 4. | (Mexico) | Christian Pérez | 1 |
| TOTAL | | | 14 |

=== Results ===
==== Results summary ====
| Overall | | | | | | | | Home | | | | | | Away | | | | | |
| Pld | W | D | L | GF | GA | GD | Pts | W | D | L | GF | GA | GD | W | D | L | GF | GA | GD |
|---|---|---|---|---|---|---|---|---|---|---|---|---|---|---|---|---|---|---|---|
| 17 | 2 | 6 | 9 | 14 | 30 | −16 | 12 | 1 | 3 | 5 | 8 | 16 | −8 | 1 | 3 | 4 | 6 | 14 | −8 |

Last updated: 29 April 2012.
Source: Clausura 2012 results

==== Results by round ====
| Round | 1 | 2 | 3 | 4 | 5 | 6 | 7 | 8 | 9 | 10 | 11 | 12 | 13 | 14 | 15 | 16 | 17 |
|---|---|---|---|---|---|---|---|---|---|---|---|---|---|---|---|---|---|
| Ground | H | A | H | A | H | A | H | A | H | A | H | A | H | A | H | H | A |
| Result | L | L | W | D | L | L | L | D | L | L | D | L | L | W | D | D | D |
| Position | 18 | 17 | 14 | 13 | 15 | 16 | 17 | 18 | 18 | 18 | 18 | 18 | 18 | 18 | 18 | 17 | 17 |

Updated to match(es) played on 29 April 2012. Source: Clausura 2012 results and mediotiempo.com
A = Away; H = Home; W = Win; D = Draw; L = Loss
