= 2010 Copa Libertadores finals =

2010 Copa Libertadores de América finals
- Event: 2010 Copa Libertadores de América
Guadalajara	Internacional
(Mexico)	(Brazil)
3	5
- Inter won 6–0 on points

First leg
Guadalajara	Internacional
1	2
- Date: 11 August 2010
- Venue: Estadio Omnilife, Zapopan
- Man of the Match: Andrés D'Alessandro
- Referee: Héctor Baldassi (Argentina)
- Attendance: 49,500

Second leg
Internacional	Guadalajara
3	2
- Date: 18 August 2010
- Venue: Estádio José Pinheiro Borda (Beira-Rio), Porto Alegre
- Man of the Match: Tinga
- Referee: Óscar Ruiz (Colombia)
- Attendance: 56,000

The 2010 Copa Libertadores de América finals was the final two-legged series that determined the 2010 Copa Libertadores de América champion. It was contested between Mexican club Guadalajara and Brazilian club Internacional. The first leg was played on 11 August in Guadalajara's home field, while the second leg was played in Internacional's.

Guadalajara was playing in their first finals and is the second Mexican team to reach this stage of the Copa Libertadores. Internacional was making their third finals appearance, having finished 2nd in 1980 and winning it in 2006. To go along with the international press that normally accompanies the finals of this competition, football legend Pelé, two-times winner of the Copa Libertadores in 1962 and 1963 with Santos (as well as being three-times winner of the FIFA World Cup), handed the trophy to the winner.

The Colorados won their second title of the tournament, beating Guadalajara 5–3 on points. The refereeing team came from Colombia and Argentina, being represented by Héctor Baldassi and Óscar Ruiz, respectively. Internacional, as the champions, played the winners of the 2010 Copa Sudamericana in the 2011 Recopa Sudamericana. Internacional, by virtue of being the last South American team in the competition, was predetermined to enter the semifinals of the 2010 FIFA Club World Cup before winning the finals.

== Qualified teams ==
Team	Previous finals appearances (bold indicates winners)
(Mexico) Guadalajara	None
(Brazil) Internacional	1980, **2006**

== Venues ==
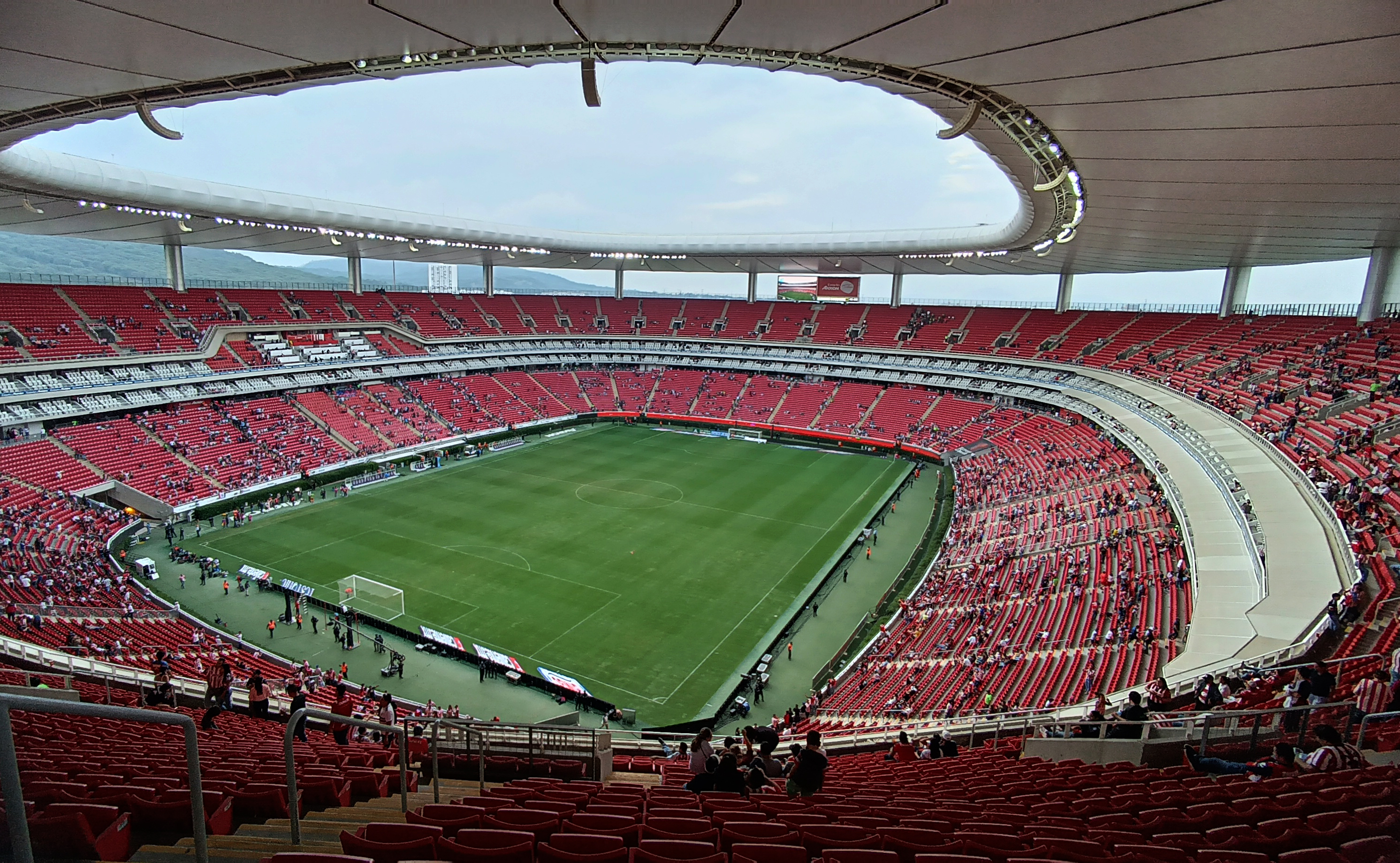
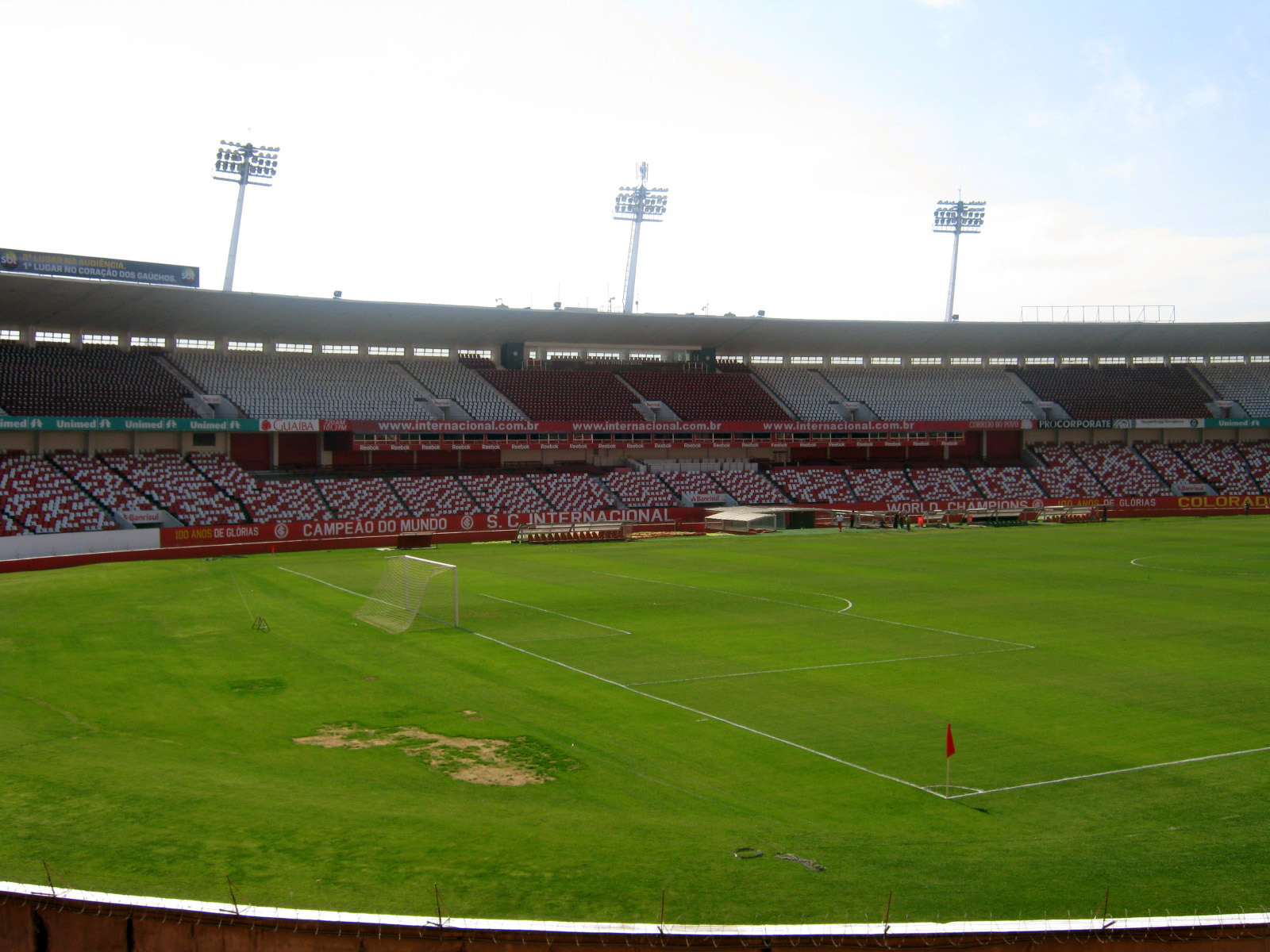
Estadio Omnilife (left) and Estadio Beira-Rio, venues for the series

== Rules ==
The final is played over two legs; home and away. The higher seeded team plays the second leg at home. The team that accumulates the most points —three for a win, one for a draw, zero for a loss— after the two legs is crowned the champion. The away-goals rule is not used. Should the two teams be tied on points after the second leg, the team with the best goal difference wins. If the two teams have equal goal difference, extra time is used. The extra time consists of two 15-minute halves. If the tie is still not broken, a penalty shoot-out ensues according to the Laws of the Game.

== Road to the finals ==
=== Internacional ===
Internacional qualified to the Copa Libertdores as the 2009 Campeonato Brasileiro Série A runner-up. They were drawn into Group 5 of the Second Stage along with Ecuadorian clubs Deportivo Quito and Emelec, and Uruguayan club Cerro.

final Group 5 standings
Team	Pld	W	D	L	GF	GA	GD	Pts
(Brazil) **Internacional**	6	3	3	0	8	2	+6	**12**
(Ecuador) Deportivo Quito	6	3	1	2	5	7	−2	**10**
(Uruguay) Cerro	6	2	2	2	5	5	0	**8**
(Ecuador) Emelec	6	0	2	4	2	6	−4	**2**

Their first group play match was at home against Emelec. After falling behind in the games, Nei and Alecsandro both scored to secure the win. They drew their next two games away at Deportivo Quito and Cerro, respectively, 1–1 and 0–0. Giuliano scored for Inter against Deportivo Quito. Their fourth game, back at home against Cerro, ended in a 2–0 win. Alecsandro scored for Internacional after Walter Ibáñez scored into his own net. Emelec held Internacional to a 0–0 draw in Guayaquil. Internacional won their last game 3–0 against Deportivo Quito at home. Andrezinho, Bolívar, and Alecsandro scored for Inter. Internacional finished first in their group and secured the 6 seed for the knockout stages. They were the only team from Group 5 to advance.

Internacional's Round of 16 opponent was Argentine club Banfield. The first match between the two ended in a 3–1 loss. Kléber scored Inter's only goal of the game. Back at home for the second leg, Inter beat the Argentine's 2–0 with goals by Alecsandro and Walter. Inter advanced to the quarterfinals thanks to Kléber's away goal in the first leg. Their next opponent was the defending champion, Argentine club Estudiantes de La Plata. They won the first leg at home 1–0 with a goal by Gonzalo Sorondo. The second leg, in La Plata, ended in defeat by a score of 2–1. Giuliano scored Inter's only goal, which was enough to advance by away goals. São Paulo was Inter's semifinal opponent. The first leg, played at home, ended in a 1–0 win with a goal by Giuliano. As in the quarterfinals, Inter lost away 2–1. The away goal Alecsandro sealed their slot in the finals.

=== Guadalajara ===
Guadalajara's had an automatic slot in the Round of 16 as the 13 seed. Their slot came as a compromise after the fallout of the 2009 flu pandemic during the 2009 Copa Libertadores. Their Round of 16 opponent was Argentine club Vélez Sársfield. The first game was won 3–0 with two goals by Omar Bravo and a goal from the penalty spot by Héctor Reynoso. The second leg was lost 2–0 back in Buenos Aires. Chivas advanced by goal difference. Their quarterfinals opponent was Paraguayan club Libertad. The scores for both legs mirror: 3–0 home and 2–0 away. Their goals in the first leg were two by Omar Bravo and Ricardo Michel Vázquez. Again, they advanced by goal difference. Their semifinal opponent was Chilean Universidad de Chile. Their first game ended in a 1–1 draw at home. Omar Arellano scored for Chivas in the game. The second, away in Chile, ended in a 2–0 win with goals by Xavier Báez and Jonny Magallón. The ended 4 to 1 on point and Chivas earned their place in the finals.

=== Knockout stages summary ===
Internacional			Guadalajara	
(Argentina) Banfield; A **3–1**	Kléber 50'	**Round of 16**; First leg	(Argentina) Vélez Sársfield; H **3–0**	Omar Bravo 25', 79'; Héctor Reynoso 90+2' (pen.)
(Argentina) Banfield; H **2–0**	Alecsandro 42'; Walter 58'	Second leg	(Argentina) Vélez Sársfield; A **2–0**	
(Argentina) Estudiantes; H **1–0**	Gonzalo Sorondo 88'	**Quarterfinals**; First leg	(Paraguay) Libertad; H **3–0**	Omar Bravo 7', 80'; Ricardo Michel Vázquez 29'
(Argentina) Estudiantes; A **2–1**	Giuliano 88'	Second leg	(Paraguay) Libertad; A **2–0**	
(Brazil) São Paulo; H **1–0**	Giuliano 68'	**Semifinals**; First leg	Universidad de Chile; H **1–1**	Omar Arellano 52'
(Brazil) São Paulo; A **2–1**	Alecsandro 52'	Second leg	(Chile) Universidad de Chile; A **0–2**	Xavier Báez 22'; Jonny Magallón 55'

== Background ==
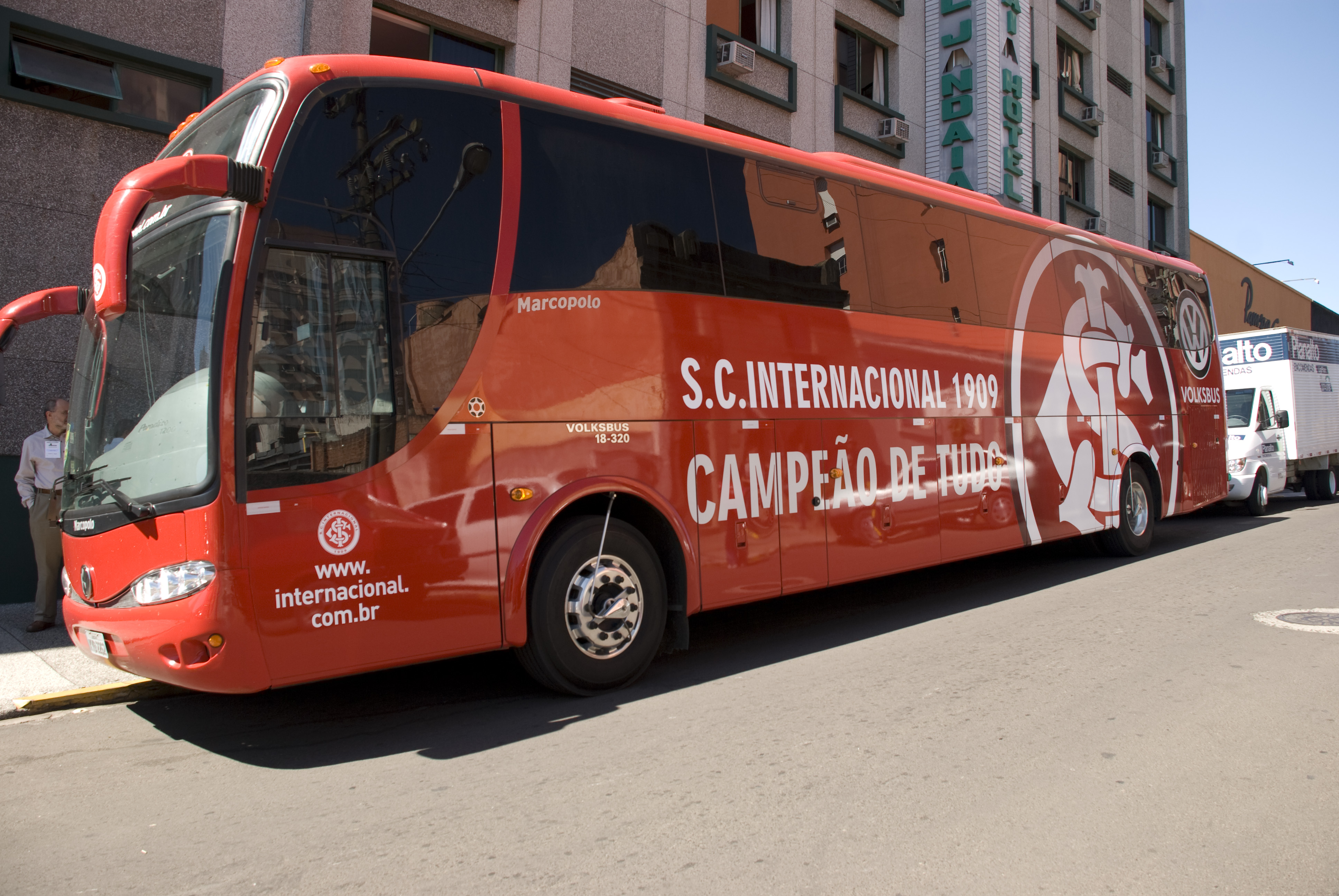
Internacional have reached their third final in history.

Prior to the 2010 final, Chivas and Internacional had previously met two times in South American competition. The first meeting between the two sides took place in the semifinals of the 2008 Copa Sudamericana; Inter won 0–2 the first match at the Estadio Jalisco in Guadalajara, and thumped the Mexicans with a 4–0 win at the Beira-Rio a week later to go through 6–0 on points (and goal aggregate). Internacional went on to win the competition. Guadalajara are entering the finals for their first time ever. This is the second time a Mexican team have reached this stage; the first to do so was Cruz Azul in the 2001 Copa Libertadores when they faced off against defending champions Boca Juniors in which the Xeneixes managed to retain the title. Internacional, on the other hand, are appearing on their third final after losing in 1980 to Nacional. In 2006, the Colorados reached their pinnacle as they beat reigning champions São Paulo. Chivas' best performance in the competition, before this edition, was reaching the semifinals of the 2005 and 2006 editions, losing to Atlético Paranaense and São Paulo, respectively.

== Venues ==
The venues for this final series are Estadio Omnilife, located in Zapopan, and Estádio Beira-Rio in Porto Alegre. The Estadio Omnilife became the first stadium to host a Copa Libertadores match on artificial turf and, inevitably, a final series match. The first leg of this finals was its first ever official match. The stadium has a seating capacity of 45,500. The stadium construction started in February 2004, so the total time of completion of the work is 6 years 5 months, among other things due to financial problems to finish the work from the start. The stadium is named after Vergara's nutritional based company, Omnilife. The Omnilife Stadium is part of the Center of Culture, Conventions and Business JVC. The stadium is located northwest of Guadalajara, within the municipality of Zapopan, Guadalajara. To the west, it is bordered by the La Primavera forest, a forest of 30,500 hectares, which is an important ecological zone in the Guadalajara Metropolitan Area.

The Estádio José Pinheiro Borda, better known as Estádio Beira-Rio, is a football stadium located on the Rio Guaíba shoreline in Porto Alegre, Rio Grande do Sul. It is named after José Pinheiro Borda – an ageing Portuguese engineer who supervised the building of the stadium for many years, thus becoming the biggest accomplisher of his own dream. He died before seeing it complete. Estádio Beira-Rio was constructed with the help of the club's enthusiasts and supporters. They contributed bringing bricks, concrete and iron. The stadium is nicknamed Beira-Rio (literally: river bank) because it is located along the margins of Rio Guaíba. Estádio Beira-Rio replaced Internacional's previous stadium, called Estádio dos Eucaliptos.

The stadium has hosted a final series match for the Copa Libertadores in 1980, 2005 and 2006. The Beira-Rio has also hosted a final series match for the Recopa Sudamericana in 2007 and 2009 as well as the 2008 final of the Copa Sudamericana. The stadium is about to undergo restoration and developments that would make it fit to host matches during the 2014 FIFA World Cup in Brazil.

== Officials ==
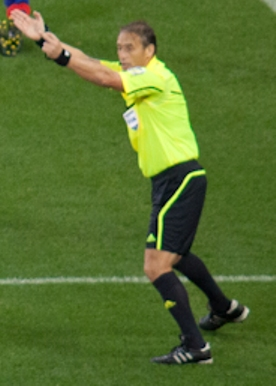
Héctor Baldassi

The referees for the 2010 Copa Libertadores finals are Héctor Baldassi of Argentina and Óscar Ruiz of Colombia. Baldassi's first officiated in the Argentine Primera División in 1998 and two years later he debuted internationally. He has officiated several CONMEBOL club competitions including the final match of the 2008 Copa Libertadores, and participated in several international competitions including the 2004 Copa América and the 2008 Olympic Games in Beijing. He was called for the 2007 FIFA U-20 World Cup, but was later dismissed because one of his assistants didn't pass the medical tests. He also refereed for the 2010 FIFA World Cup. Ruiz has been a referee since 1 January 1995, and his international debut was on 12 July 1995 (Paraguay vs. Venezuela). He officiated in the 2002 and 2006 FIFA World Cups. He was preselected as a referee for the 2010 FIFA World Cup. He is a lawyer by profession.

== Matches ==
=== First leg ===
The first leg of the finals was seen by 49,500 spectators although they weren't all seated by the time Baldassi blew his whistle. The first 15 minutes started with Internacional dominating the match, as Chivas struggled to create any rhythm. Chivas subsequently started to settle into their play and knocked the ball around fluently, but struggled to find an entrance against a dogged Colorado backline. The away side on the other hand continued to threaten out wide, and came close to scoring on the half-hour when Taison was pulled down on the edge of the area. Then, Alecsandro's free kick saw the ball hit the bar and bounce out of play. The Mexicans did manage to test Renan for the first time shortly after, the Internacional keeper reacting smartly to cut off Omar Bravo when the striker was played through behind the defence. The Colorados suffered a setback when striker and top scorer Alecsandro hobbled off injured to be replaced by Everton, but the Porto Alegre outfit continued looking the more dangerous team. With the last touch of the half however, Chivas struck against the run of play. The Mexican midfield combined smartly on the edge of the area to release Marco Fabián, and his chipped pass found Adolfo Bautista; the midfielder looped a header in from outside the area, leaving the Inter keeper scrambling back in vain.

Denied the chance for an instant response by the half-time whistle, Internacional continued to take the initiative, and Luis Michel was soon called back into action to fend off a strike from Giuliano. Chivas in turn started to place more bodies behind the ball, wary of the attacking potential their Brazilian rivals was unleashing. Chances remained few and far between for the Colorados; Andrés D'Alessandro went close with a 25-yard drive which just went wide. Internacional finally found a way through with 15 minutes left, thanks to Inter's tournament top goal scorer Giuliano. Kléber rampaged down the left hand side and put in a cross, and the 20-year-old met it perfectly to leave Michel no chance. Four minutes later, D’Alessandro floated in a centre, and club captain Bolivar got his head to it to send the visitors into a 1–2 victory. Kléber was voted as man of the match.

==== Details ====
11 August 2010
19:50 (UTC-5)

Guadalajara (Mexico)	1–2	(Brazil) Internacional
Bautista 45+2'	Report	Giuliano 73'; Bolívar 76'

Estadio Omnilife, Zapopan
Attendance: 49,500
Referee: Héctor Baldassi (Argentina)

**Guadalajara**	**Internacional**

GUADALAJARA:
GK	1	(Mexico) Luis Ernesto Michel
RB	3	(Mexico) Jonny Magallón
CB	4	(Mexico) Héctor Reynoso (c)
CB	2	(Mexico) Mario de Luna	(yellow card) 90+2'
LB	23	(United States) Miguel Ángel Ponce
CM	20	(Mexico) Edgar Mejía
CM	18	(Mexico) Xavier Báez		(substituted off) 86'
RW	9	(Mexico) Omar Arellano		(substituted off) 69'
AM	7	(Mexico) Adolfo Bautista
LW	8	(Mexico) Marco Fabián	(yellow card) 75'	(substituted off) 79'
CF	17	(Mexico) Omar Bravo
Substitutes:
GK	22	(Mexico) Sergio Arias
DF	16	(Mexico) Dionicio Escalante		(substituted on) 79'
DF	21	(Mexico) Christian Pérez
DF	25	(Mexico) Juan Antonio Ocampo
MF	5	(Mexico) Patricio Araujo		(substituted on) 69'
MF	11	(Mexico) Ulises Dávila		(substituted on) 86'
FW	15	(Mexico) Michel Vázquez
Manager:
(Mexico) José Luis Real

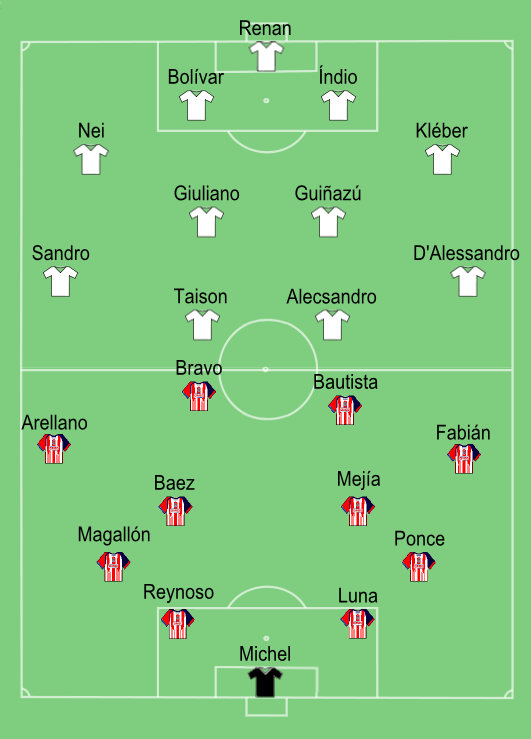

INTERNACIONAL:
GK	28	(Brazil) Renan
RB	15	(Brazil) Nei
CB	2	(Brazil) Bolívar (c)
CB	3	(Brazil) Índio
LB	6	(Brazil) Kléber
CM	8	(Brazil) Sandro	(yellow card) 88'
CM	5	(Argentina) Pablo Guiñazú
RW	11	(Brazil) Giuliano
AM	7	(Brazil) Taison		(substituted off) 86'
LW	10	(Argentina) Andrés D'Alessandro
CF	9	(Brazil) Alecsandro		(substituted off) 34'
Substitutes:
GK	25	(Argentina) Roberto Abbondanzieri
DF	4	(Brazil) Fabiano Eller
MF	17	(Brazil) Andrézinho
MF	20	(Brazil) Glaydson
MF	21	(Brazil) Wilson Tiago		(substituted on) 86'
FW	23	(Brazil) Rafael Sóbis
FW	27	(Brazil) Everton		(substituted on) 34'
Manager:
(Brazil) Celso Roth

Man of the Match:
(Argentina) Andrés D'Alessandro

Assistant referees:
(Argentina) Ricardo Casas
(Argentina) Hernán Maidana
Fourth official:
(Argentina) Saúl Laverni

=== Second leg ===
Tinga became the main drive of Internacional during this match, while for Chivas, it was Patricio Araujo, who took the place of Edgar Mejia. The Colorados entered the game with great ambition and sought to open the scoreline; Chivas, however, held firm and started accommodating themselves on the field. At the 9th minute, the Guadalajara players showed objections to the Colombian referee over the yellow card give to Mario de Luna (despite clearly not touching the ball). There was no clear, dominant team in the field. Índio created the first dangerous play of the match, but mIchel safely secured the effort. Adolfo Bautista also started to test Renan with long range shots. Marco Fabián was later shown a yellow card for a late challenge on D'Alessandro. However, he would later silence the stadium with a spectacular goal right before the end of the first half. Araujo served a long ball that crossed Inter's goal area, and Omar Bravo managed to head the ball towards Fabián. Fabián positioned himself and performed a bicycle kick to kick the ball towards the top left of Internacional's net (with Renan not being able to do anything about it). This goal tied the series 2–2 and would have forced extra time.

Internacional came out in the second half with more urgency, with Taison and Sobis providing dangerous opportunities of goal. Chivas dedicated themselves to waiting and counter-attacking; it proved to be a double-edge sword during the 62nd minute when Kléber crossed a perfect ball from the left flank into Michel's goal area, to have Sobis tap it in and score, putting the scoreline at one-all and winning the aggregate 3–2. The stadium erupted in cheers and the home side seemed to get into rhythm again. Inter's manager Roth showed his ambition when he sent Giuliano on the field to replace the injured Sobis minutes after scoring the equalizer. At the 75th minute, a glaring error from Fabián as he executed a wrong pass to Leandro Damião, who just came on the field to replace Taison. Leandro made his way towards Chivas' goal and kicked the ball hard enough to go into the net, despite rebounding on Michel's right arm. José Luis Real began to make changes to try to reverse the adverse 4–2 aggregate. But Omar Arellano received his marching orders 5 minutes from the end for a spiteful foul on D'Alessandro. With one minute to go, Guiliano managed to score one last time as he dribbled past the Mexican defense and cheekily put the ball away in the net. Chivas would score on the last minute of injury time, as Bautista's free kick met Renan's post only for the ball to land in the path of Omar Bravo, which he put away to make the aggregate 5–3. However, it was too late as Ruiz blew the whistle for full-time.

==== Details ====
18 August 2010
22:00 (UTC-3)

Internacional (Brazil)	3–2	(Mexico) Guadalajara
Sóbis 61'; Damião 75'; Giuliano 88'	Report	Fabián 42'; Bravo 90'

Estádio José Pinheiro Borda (Beira-Rio), Porto Alegre
Attendance: 56,000
Referee: Óscar Ruiz (Colombia)

**Internacional**	**Guadalajara**

INTERNACIONAL:
GK	28	(Brazil) Renan
RB	15	(Brazil) Nei
CB	2	(Brazil) Bolívar (c)	(yellow card) 65'
CB	3	(Brazil) Índio
LB	6	(Brazil) Kléber
CM	8	(Brazil) Sandro
CM	16	(Brazil) Tinga		(substituted off) 84'
CM	5	(Argentina) Pablo Guiñazú
RF	10	(Argentina) Andrés D'Alessandro
CF	23	(Brazil) Rafael Sóbis		(substituted off) 65'
LF	7	(Brazil) Taison		(substituted off) 73'
Substitutes:
GK	25	(Argentina) Roberto Abbondanzieri
DF	4	(Brazil) Fabiano Eller
MF	11	(Brazil) Giuliano		(substituted on) 65'
MF	17	(Brazil) Andrézinho
MF	20	(Brazil) Glaydson
MF	21	(Brazil) Wilson Tiago		(substituted on) 84'
FW	22	(Brazil) Leandro Damião		(substituted on) 73'
Manager:
(Brazil) Celso Roth

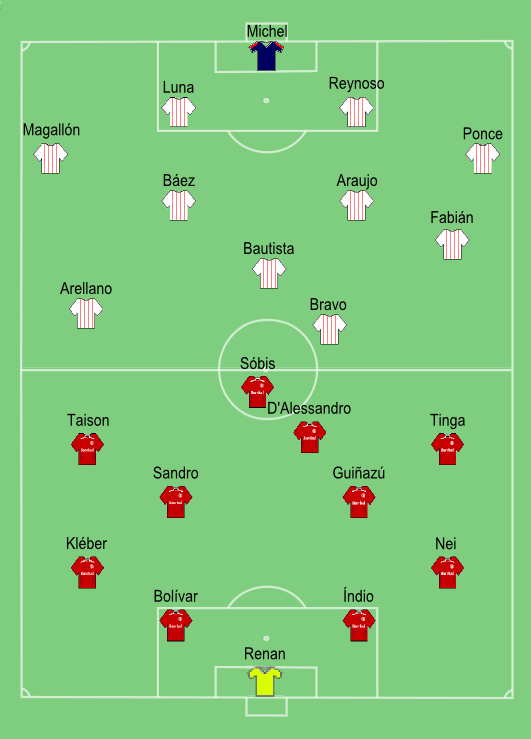

GUADALAJARA:
GK	1	(Mexico) Luis Ernesto Michel
RB	3	(Mexico) Jonny Magallón
CB	4	(Mexico) Héctor Reynoso (c)
CB	2	(Mexico) Mario de Luna	(yellow card) 10'
LB	23	(United States) Miguel Ángel Ponce		(substituted off) 79'
CM	5	(Mexico) Patricio Araujo
CM	18	(Mexico) Xavier Báez		(substituted off) 82'
RW	9	(Mexico) Omar Arellano	(red card) 87'
AM	7	(Mexico) Adolfo Bautista
LW	8	(Mexico) Marco Fabián	(yellow card) 19'
CF	17	(Mexico) Omar Bravo
Substitutes:
GK	22	(Mexico) Sergio Arias
DF	16	(Mexico) Dionicio Escalante		(substituted on) 79'
DF	21	(Mexico) Christian Pérez
DF	25	(Mexico) Juan Antonio Ocampo
MF	11	(Mexico) Ulises Dávila
FW	10	(Mexico) Alberto Medina
FW	15	(Mexico) Michel Vázquez		(substituted on) 82'
Manager:
(Mexico) José Luis Real

Man of the Match:
(Brazil) Tinga

Assistant referees:
(Colombia) Abraham González
(Colombia) Humberto Clavijo
Fourth official:
(Colombia) José Buitrago

=== Statistics ===
First leg

Guadalajara		Internacional
1	Goals scored	2
3	Total shots	8
1	Shots on target	5
41%	Ball possession	59%
0	Corner kicks	3
12	Fouls committed	10
0	Offsides	1
2	Yellow cards	1
0	Red cards	0

Second leg

Internacional		Guadalajara
3	Goals scored	2
12	Total shots	6
9	Shots on target	4
60%	Ball possession	40%
6	Corner kicks	1
5	Fouls committed	21
2	Offsides	1
1	Yellow cards	2
0	Red cards	1

Combined tally

Guadalajara		Internacional
3	Goals scored	5
9	Total shots	20
5	Shots on target	14
41%	Ball possession	59%
1	Corner kicks	9
33	Fouls committed	15
1	Offsides	3
4	Yellow cards	2
1	Red cards	0
