= Primera División de México Apertura 2006 =

Primera División de México
- Season: 2006−07
- Champions: Guadalajara (11th title)
- Champions' Cup: Guadalajara
- Copa Libertadores: Toluca; Necaxa; América (First Stage)
- Copa Sudamericana: Guadalajara
- Top goalscorer: Bruno Marioni (11 goals)

Primera División de México (Mexico First Division) Apertura 2006 was the 2006 edition of La Primera División del Futbol Méxicano, crowning Mexico's autumn football champion. The season ran from August 5 to December 10, 2006. Querétaro was promoted to the Primera División de México thus, Dorados was relegated to the Primera División A. Guadalajara won the championship for a record 11th time, qualifying for the CONCACAF Champions' Cup 2007.

== Clubs ==
Location of the Primera División Clausura 2006 teams

Team	City	Stadium
América	Mexico City	Azteca
Atlante	Mexico City	Azteca
Atlas	Guadalajara, Jalisco	Jalisco
Chiapas	Tuxtla Gutiérrez, Chiapas	Víctor Manuel Reyna
Cruz Azul	Mexico City	Azul
Guadalajara	Guadalajara, Jalisco	Jalisco
Morelia	Morelia, Michoacán	Morelos
Monterrey	Monterrey, Nuevo León	Tecnológico
Necaxa	Aguascalientes, Aguascalientes	Victoria
Pachuca	Pachuca, Hidalgo	Hidalgo
Querétaro	Querétaro, Querétaro	Corregidora
San Luis	San Luis Potosí, S.L.P.	Alfonso Lastras
Santos Laguna	Torreón, Coahuila	Corona
Toluca	Toluca, State of Mexico	Nemesio Díez
UAG	Zapopan, Jalisco	Tres de Marzo
UANL	San Nicolás de los Garza, Nuevo León	Universitario
UNAM	Mexico City	Olímpico Universitario
Veracruz	Veracruz, Veracruz	Luis "Pirata" Fuente

== Regular phase ==
Pos	Team	Pld	W	D	L	GF	GA	GD	Pts	Qualification
1	Cruz Azul	17	9	3	5	27	20	+7	30	Directly qualified to the Liguilla (Playoffs)
2	Atlas	17	7	6	4	25	19	+6	27	Directly qualified to the Liguilla (Playoffs)
3	Guadalajara	17	7	5	5	26	18	+8	26	Qualified for the Repechaje
4	Chiapas	17	6	5	6	19	16	+3	23	Qualified for the Repechaje
5	Querétaro	17	5	6	6	20	25	−5	18 (Note: 3 points deducted for failure to fulfill under-21 player requirements)	
6	Necaxa	17	4	5	8	18	26	−8	17	

Source: MedioTiempo
Notes:

Group 2
Pos	Team	Pld	W	D	L	GF	GA	GD	Pts	Qualification
1	Monterrey	17	7	6	4	27	21	+6	27	Directly qualified to the Liguilla (Playoffs)
2	Pachuca	17	7	5	5	32	22	+10	26	Directly qualified to the Liguilla (Playoffs)
3	Veracruz	17	8	2	7	26	31	−5	26	Qualified for the Repechaje
4	Atlante	17	6	5	6	19	20	−1	23	
5	San Luis	17	6	5	6	14	12	+2	20 (Note: 3 points deducted for failure to fulfill under-21 player requirements)	
6	UAG	17	3	4	10	22	35	−13	13	

Source: MedioTiempo
Notes:

Group 3
Pos	Team	Pld	W	D	L	GF	GA	GD	Pts	Qualification
1	UNAM	17	8	5	4	21	11	+10	29	Directly qualified to the Liguilla (Playoffs)
2	América	17	8	5	4	21	15	+6	29	Directly qualified to the Liguilla (Playoffs)
3	Toluca	17	7	6	4	27	16	+11	27	Qualified for the Repechaje
4	Morelia	17	7	2	8	24	26	−2	23	
5	UANL	17	3	5	9	14	37	−23	14	
6	Santos Laguna	17	1	8	8	19	31	−12	11	

Source: MedioTiempo

== League table ==
Pos	Team	Pld	W	D	L	GF	GA	GD	Pts	Qualification
1	Cruz Azul	17	9	3	5	27	20	+7	30	Directly qualified to the Liguilla (Playoffs)
2	UNAM	17	8	5	4	21	11	+10	29	Directly qualified to the Liguilla (Playoffs)
3	América	17	8	5	4	21	15	+6	29	Directly qualified to the Liguilla (Playoffs)
4	Toluca	17	7	6	4	27	16	+11	27	Qualified for the Repechage
5	Monterrey	17	7	6	4	27	21	+6	27	Directly qualified to the Liguilla (Playoffs)
6	Atlas	17	7	6	4	25	19	+6	27	Directly qualified to the Liguilla (Playoffs)
7	Pachuca	17	7	5	5	32	22	+10	26	Directly qualified to the Liguilla (Playoffs)
8	Guadalajara	17	7	5	5	26	18	+8	26	Qualified for the Repechage
9	Veracruz	17	8	2	7	26	31	−5	26	Qualified for the Repechage
10	Chiapas	17	6	5	6	19	16	+3	23	Qualified for the Repechage
11	Atlante	17	6	5	6	19	20	−1	23	
12	Morelia	17	7	2	8	24	26	−2	23	
13	San Luis	17	6	5	6	14	12	+2	20 (Note: 3 points deducted for failure to fulfill under-21 player requirements)	
14	Querétaro	17	5	6	6	20	25	−5	18	
15	Necaxa	17	4	5	8	18	26	−8	17	
16	UANL	17	3	5	9	14	37	−23	14	
17	UAG	17	3	4	10	22	35	−13	13	
18	Santos Laguna	17	1	8	8	19	31	−12	11	

Source: MedioTiempo

== Top goalscorers ==
Players sorted first by goals scored, then by last name. Only regular season goals listed.

Rank	Player	Club	Goals
1	(Argentina) Bruno Marioni	Toluca	11
2	(Brazil) Kléber Boas	Necaxa	9
2	(Mexico) Miguel Sabah	Cruz Azul	9
4	(Mexico) Omar Bravo	Guadalajara	8
4	(Paraguay) Salvador Cabañas	América	8
4	(Mexico) Juan Carlos Cacho	Pachuca	8
4	(Argentina) Mauro Néstor Gerk	Querétaro	8
8	(Uruguay) Sebastian Abreu	Sinaloa	7
8	(Uruguay) Gustavo Biscayzacú	Atlante	7
8	(Costa Rica) Óscar Rojas	Chiapas	7

Source: MedioTiempo

== Results ==
Home \ Away	AME	ATE	ATS	CHI	CAZ	GDL	MTY	MOR	NEC	PAC	QRO	SNL	SAN	TOL	UAG	UNL	UNM	VER
América	—	–	–	–	–	–	1–1	2–1	2–1	3–1	–	–	–	1–1	–	1–1	2–0	5–1
Atlante	0–0	—	0–2	0–1	–	–	–	2–0	–	–	–	1–0	2–3	2–2	–	2–0	–	2–0
Atlas	2–0	–	—	–	–	–	2–1	–	2–1	1–1	–	0–1	–	0–0	–	–	1–0	3–1
Chiapas	2–0	–	4–0	—	–	–	1–1	–	1–0	0–1	1–1	1–1	–	–	–	–	0–1	–
Cruz Azul	1–2	2–1	2–1	1–0	—	–	2–0	–	1–2	–	–	0–1	1–0	–	–	–	0–1	–
Guadalajara	2–0	1–1	3–1	1–0	2–3	—	–	–	4–0	–	–	1–0	3–1	–	–	–	0–0	–
Monterrey	–	3–0	–	–	–	1–1	—	2–0	–	3–1	2–2	–	–	2–1		2–1	–	3–0
Morelia	–	–	1–1	2–1	4–4	3–2	–	—	–	–	2–0	1–0	3–2	–	2–1	–	–	3–2
Necaxa	–	0–0	–	–	–	–	1–1	1–3	—	3–1	1–2	–	–	0–2	2–1	1–0	–	1–2
Pachuca	–	2–2	–	–	2–3	1–2	–	2–0	–	—	0–0	–	–	3–1	5–2	5–0	–	0–0
Querétaro	1–0	1–2	1–1	1–2	2–1	1–1	–	–	–	–	—	2–2	2–1	–	–	–	1–1	–
San Luis	0–1	–	–	–	–	–	1–0	–	1–1	0–3	–	—	–	1–0	–	2–0	0–1	4–0
Santos Laguna	0–1	–	1–1	0–0	–	–	2–2	–	2–2	1–1	–	0–0	—	–	–	–	1–1	–
Toluca	–	–	–	–	1–1	1–0	–	2–1	–	–	3–0	–	1–0	—	2–1	7–0	–	2–3
UAG	0–0	3–1	1–6	2–3	1–1	2–1	–	–	–	–	0–2	0–0	4–2	–	—	–	–	–
UANL	–	–	1–1	1–1	0–2	0–0	–	2–1	–	–	3–2	–	2–2	–	2–1	—	–	–
UNAM	–	0–1	–	–	–	–	3–0	1–0	1–1	1–3	–	–	–	0–0		5–0	—	3–1
Veracruz	–	–	–	3–1	0–2	3–2	–	1–0	–	–	3–0	–	5–1	–	1–1	2–1	–	—

Updated to match(es) played on 12 November 2006. Source: RSSSF
Legend: Blue = home team win; Yellow = draw; Red = away team win.

== Final phase (Liguilla) ==
=== Repechaje ===
November 16, 2006
15:00

Chiapas	1–0	Toluca
Brown 59'	Report

Estadio Víctor Manuel Reyna, Tuxtla Gutiérrez
Referee: Jorge Eduardo Gasso (Mexico City)
November 19, 2006
16:00

Toluca	2–0	Chiapas
Hassan 77'; Sánchez 90+2'	Report

Estadio Nemesio Díez, Toluca
Referee: Mauricio Morales (Mexico City)

Toluca won 2–1 on aggregate.

November 15, 2006
21:00

Veracruz	1–2	Guadalajara
Sánchez 53'	Report	Martínez 18'; Medina 62'

Estadio Luis "Pirata" Fuente, Veracruz
Referee: Germán Arredondo Ramírez (Guanajuato)
November 18, 2006
19:00

Guadalajara	4–0	Veracruz
Medina 12'; Bautista 41'; Ayala 60' (o.g.); Santana 90'	Report

Estadio Jalisco, Guadalajara
Referee: Roberto García Orozco (Mexico City)

Guadalajara won 6–1 on aggregate.

=== Bracket ===
Quarterfinals
4	Toluca	0	2	2
5	Monterrey	0	1	1
2	UNAM	1	0	1
7	Pachuca	1	1	2
3	América	3	3	6
6	Atlas	1	3	4
1	Cruz Azul	0	2	2
8	Guadalajara	2	2	4

Semifinals
4	Toluca	1	1	2
7	Pachuca	1	0	1
3	América	0	0	0
8	Guadalajara	2	0	2

Finals
4	Toluca	1	1	2
8	Guadalajara	1	2	3

=== Quarterfinals ===
November 23, 2006
19:00

Monterrey	0–0	Toluca
	Report

Estadio Tecnológico, Monterrey
Referee: Roberto García Orozco (Mexico City)
November 26, 2006
14:00

Toluca	2–1	Monterrey
Sánchez 11'; Marioni 38'	Report	Abreu 85' (pen.)

Estadio Nemesio Díez, Toluca
Referee: Germán Arredondo Ramírez (Guanajuato)

Toluca won 2–1 on aggregate.

November 24, 2006
20:00

Pachuca	1–1	UNAM
de la Barrera 60'	Report	López 63'

Estadio Hidalgo, Pachuca
Referee: Paul Delgadillo (Jalisco)
November 26, 2006
12:00

UNAM	0–1	Pachuca
	Report	Caballero 53'

Estadio Olímpico Universitario, Mexico City
Referee: Marco Antonio Rodríguez (Mexico City)

Pachuca won 2–1 on aggregate.

November 23, 2006
21:00

Atlas	1–3	América
Murguía 72'	Report	López 5'; Vuoso 19'; Villa 57'

Estadio Jalisco, Guadalajara
Referee: Hugo León Guajardo (Mexico City)
November 26, 2006
16:00

América	3–3	Atlas
Blanco 70'; Cabañas 74'; Santiago 81' (o.g.)	Report	Guardado 14'; Osorno 26'; Pérez 56'

Estadio Azteca, Mexico City
Referee: Armando Archundia (Estado de México)

América won 6–4 on aggregate.

November 22, 2006
20:30

Guadalajara	2–0	Cruz Azul
Bravo 47'; Bautista 71'	Report

Estadio Jalisco, Guadalajara
Referee: José Gabriel Gómez (Morelos)
November 25, 2006
17:00

Cruz Azul	2–2	Guadalajara
Núñez 44'; Sabah 61'	Report	Morales 38' (pen.), 48'

Estadio Azul, Mexico City
Referee: Manuel Ernesto Glower (Mexico City)

Guadalajara won 4–2 on aggregate.

=== Semifinals ===
November 29, 2006
19:00

Pachuca	1–1	Toluca
Landín 70'	Report	Marioni 55'

Estadio Hidalgo, Pachuca
Referee: Manuel Ernesto Glower (Mexico City)
December 3, 2006
12:00

Toluca	1–0	Pachuca
Sánchez 51'	Report

Estadio Nemesio Díez, Toluca
Referee: Roberto García Orozco (Mexico City)

Toluca won 2–1 on aggregate.

November 30, 2006
21:00

Guadalajara	2–0	América
Morales 53' (pen.); Bravo 60'	Report

Estadio Jalisco, Guadalajara
Referee: Marco Antonio Rodríguez (Mexico City)
December 3, 2006
20:00

América	0–0	Guadalajara
	Report

Estadio Azteca, Mexico City
Referee: Germán Arredondo Ramírez (Guanajuato)

Guadalajara won 2–0 on aggregate.

=== Finals ===
December 7, 2006
21:00

Guadalajara	1–1	Toluca
Bravo 44'	Report	Marioni 75'

Estadio Jalisco, Guadalajara
Referee: José Gabriel Gómez (Morelos)
December 10, 2006
12:00

Toluca	1–2	Guadalajara
Marioni 18'	Report	Rodríguez 51'; Bautista 69'

Estadio Nemesio Díez, Toluca
Referee: Armando Archundia (Estado de México)

Guadalajara won 3–2 on aggregate.

Champions

11th title
