= Omar Bravo =

Mexican footballer (born 1980)

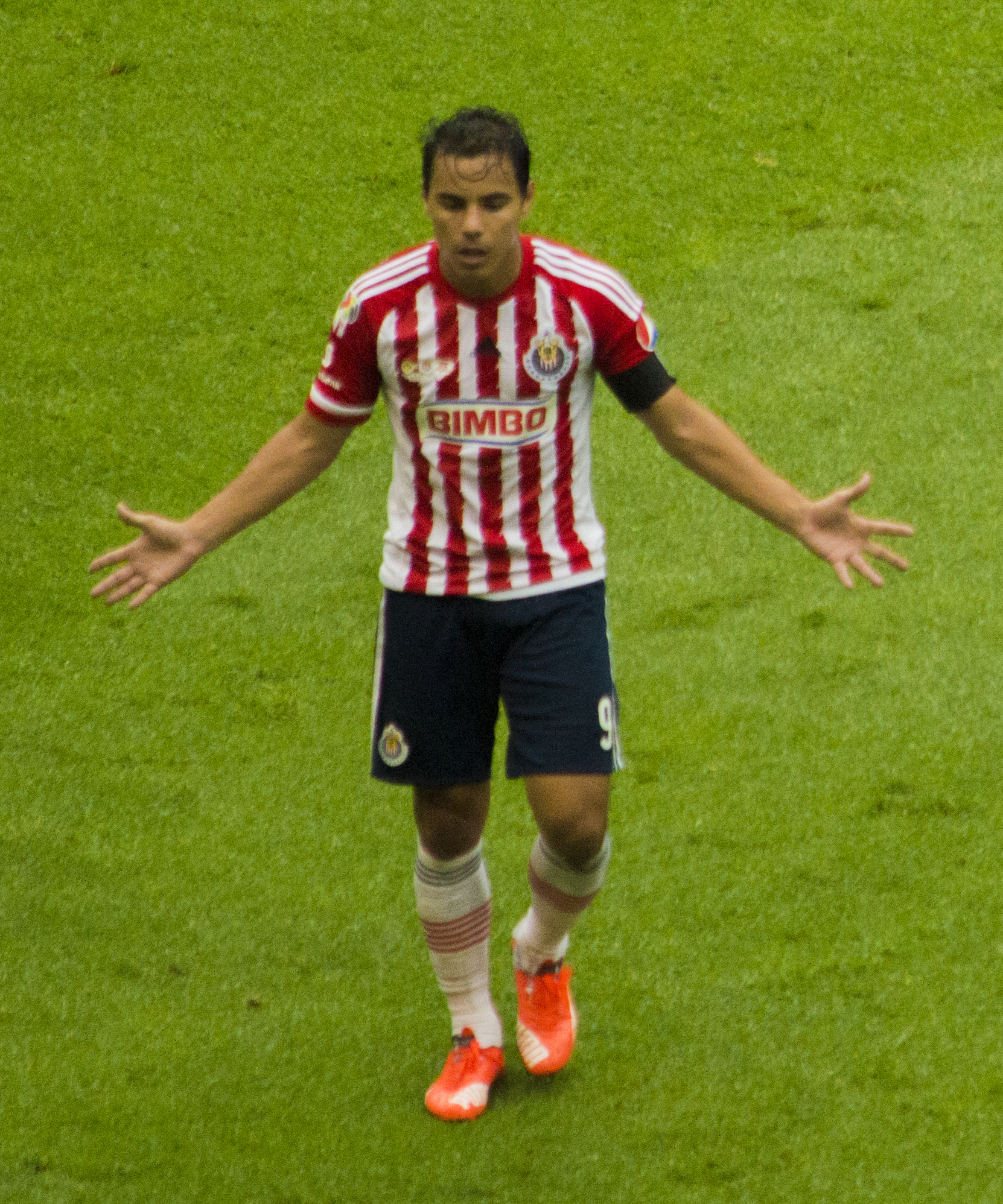
- Bravo with Guadalajara in 2015

Personal information
- Full name: Omar Bravo Tordecillas
- Date of birth: 4 March 1980 (age 46)
- Place of birth: Los Mochis, Sinaloa, Mexico
- Height: 1.74 m (5 ft 9 in)
- Position: Striker

Senior career*
Years	Team	Apps	(Gls)
2001–2008	Guadalajara	258	(101)
2008–2009	Deportivo La Coruña	9	(1)
2009	→ Tigres UANL (loan)	6	(0)
2009–2010	Guadalajara	41	(7)
2011	Sporting Kansas City	27	(9)
2012–2013	Cruz Azul	36	(6)
2013	→ Atlas (loan)	33	(13)
2013–2017	Guadalajara	83	(24)
2016	→ North Carolina (loan)	14	(4)
2017	→ Phoenix Rising (loan)	13	(1)
2019–2020	UdeG	16	(3)
Total		536	(169)

International career
2004	Mexico Olympic (O.P.)	3	(2)
2003–2013	Mexico	66	(15)

Managerial career
- 2024: Arizona Monsoon FC
Medal record
Men's football
Representing Mexico
CONCACAF Gold Cup
Winner	2003 United States-Mexico	Team
Winner	2009 United States	Team
Runner-up	2007 United States	Team
Copa America
Third place	2007 Venezuela	Team
- * Club domestic league appearances and goals

Omar Bravo Tordecillas (born 4 March 1980) is a Mexican football manager and former footballer who played as a striker. Over the course of three spells with Guadalajara, he made more than 400 appearances and scored 160 goals in all competitions, to become the club's all-time leading scorer.

== Club career ==
=== First spell with Guadalajara ===
Bravo was brought to the Guadalajara youth system by José Luis Real. He made his debut with the senior team under manager Jorge Dávalos on 17 February 2001 against Tigres UANL in a 0–0 draw. Bravo became a regular starter for the team during the 2002 Apertura, playing 15 games and scoring 6 goals. He won the tournament's Best Rookie award.

Bravo finished the 2005 Clausura as joint-second top goalscorer of the league with 12 goals. His performances helped him win the tournament's Best Forward award.

In 2006, Bravo participated in a successful season for Guadalajara, helping the team win the Apertura championship title, Bravo scored the leading goal in the first leg match of the Apertura finals, which ended in a 1–1 draw against Toluca, winning 3–2 on aggregate. Bravo finished as the club's top scorer for the tournament with 8 goals, helping him win the tournament's Best Forward award.

Bravo scored in his first appearance in the CONCACAF Champions' Cup against W Connection F.C. as well as in the first match of the semifinals against D.C. United. In the first leg of final, on 8 April 2007, he scored a brace against Pachuca to a 2–2 draw. Guadalajara lost the finals following a penalty shootout. He finished as joint-top scorer with four goals in the tournament. For the 2007 Clausura, he won the Golden Boot for most goals in the league with 11 goals in 17 matches, winning the Best Forward award again.

On 26 April 2008, Bravo scored his 100th goal in a 4–0 victory over Puebla, becoming the 2nd player in the club's history to reach 100 goals, only behind Salvador Reyes, who has 122 goals. On 17 May, he played his last match of his first stint with Guadalajara scoring a goal against Monterrey in the Clausura quarter-finals, which they tied 4–4, losing 8–5 on aggregate.

=== Deportivo de La Coruña ===
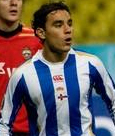
Bravo playing for Deportivo la Coruña

On 22 May 2008, Deportivo de La Coruña announced an agreement with Bravo for the next three years as he left as a free agent. Bravo became the second Mexican on Deportivo's squad at that time, after Andrés Guardado. Bravo made his league debut on 31 August in a 2–1 victory over Real Madrid. On 8 December he scored his first league goal against Málaga as a penalty kick in a 2–0 victory. With only nine league appearances (only two of them as a starter), it was evident that his stint at the Spanish club was not as successful as expected.

==== Loan to Tigres UANL ====
On 5 March 2009, he was loaned out to Mexico side Tigres UANL for the remainder of the 2009 Clausura. He made 6 appearances and scored no goals.

=== Second spell with Guadalajara ===
Following his loan stint with Tigres UANL, on 6 August, it was announced Bravo would return to Guadalajara, where he signed a 1-year contract with the club. The following month, Bravo was named captain.

On 8 August 2010, Kansas City Wizards announced that Bravo was signed as the squad's first Designated Player since Claudio López. Bravo would join Kansas beginning with the 2011 season. Bravo remained on loan with Chivas for the remainder of the year, disputing the 2010 Copa Libertadores finals against Brazilian club Internacional, where Chivas was runner-up.

=== Sporting Kansas City ===
Upon arrival in Kansas City, Bravo mentioned that he was very happy to join the team, and that he believed the level of play in MLS was among the best in the world. In his debut for the club against Chivas USA, he showed off his skilled form and managed to score two goals in a 3–2 victory. He scored nine goals for Kansas and was named MLS Latino Player of the Year.

=== Cruz Azul ===
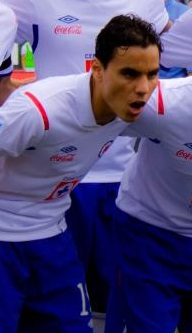
Bravo with Cruz Azul

On 12 December 2011, Sporting Kansas City announced that Bravo would not be returning in 2012 and would instead be signing with Cruz Azul in his native Mexico. He scored a brace against San Luis F.C. in a 3–1 home win. After underperforming with Cruz Azul, the club later transferred Bravo to Atlas on a loan. Later, he revealed that he felt he failed with Cruz Azul.

==== Loan to Atlas ====
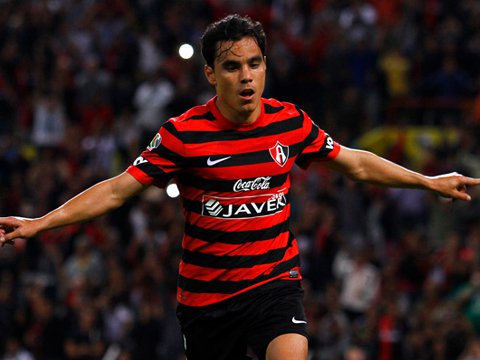
Bravo with Atlas

In December 2012, Bravo joined Atlas, rivals of his original club, C.D. Guadalajara, on loan for the entirety of the following year (for the 2013 Clausura and 2013 Apertura).

=== Third spell with Guadalajara ===
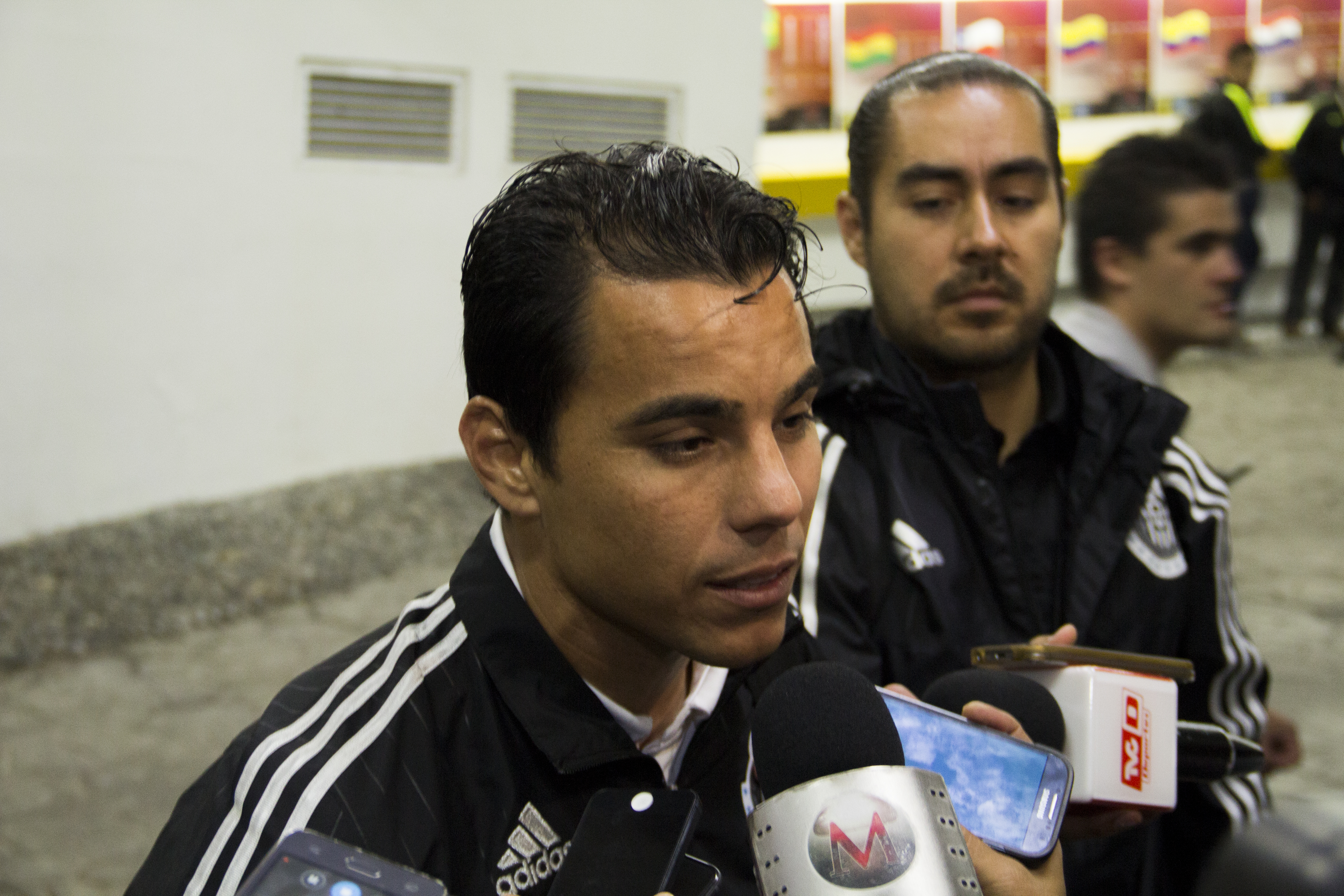
Bravo in 2015

On 4 June 2013, it was announced that Bravo would return to Guadalajara in a trade deal that saw Xavier Báez go the other way to Cruz Azul at the conclusion of his loan stint with Atlas. In December, Bravo was named captain of the team. On 4 January 2014, on his first match on his third stint with the club, he scored on the 3rd minute against Santos Laguna in a 1–1 draw.

On 12 August 2015, Bravo scored a brace at home against Morelia that converted him into Guadalajara's all-time top scorer in league matches, surpassing club legend Salvador Reyes with 123 goals. On 26 September, he scored a brace against rivals América in a 2–1 away victory, surpassing record-holder Salvador Reyes in all goals scored at all competitions.

On 28 October, he scored the only goal in the Apertura Copa MX semi-final against Toluca. The following month, he led the team to win the Copa MX final on 4 November against León in a 1–0 away victory, attaining their first major title in nine years. Bravo finished the 2015–2016 season scoring 11 goals in 34 games. On 10 July 2016, Bravo scored his last goal for Chivas playing against Veracruz in the last minute of the game ending in 2–0 win giving them their first Supercopa MX title their second in nine months and clinched Guadalajara a spot for the 2017 Copa Libertadores.

==== Loan to Carolina RailHawks ====
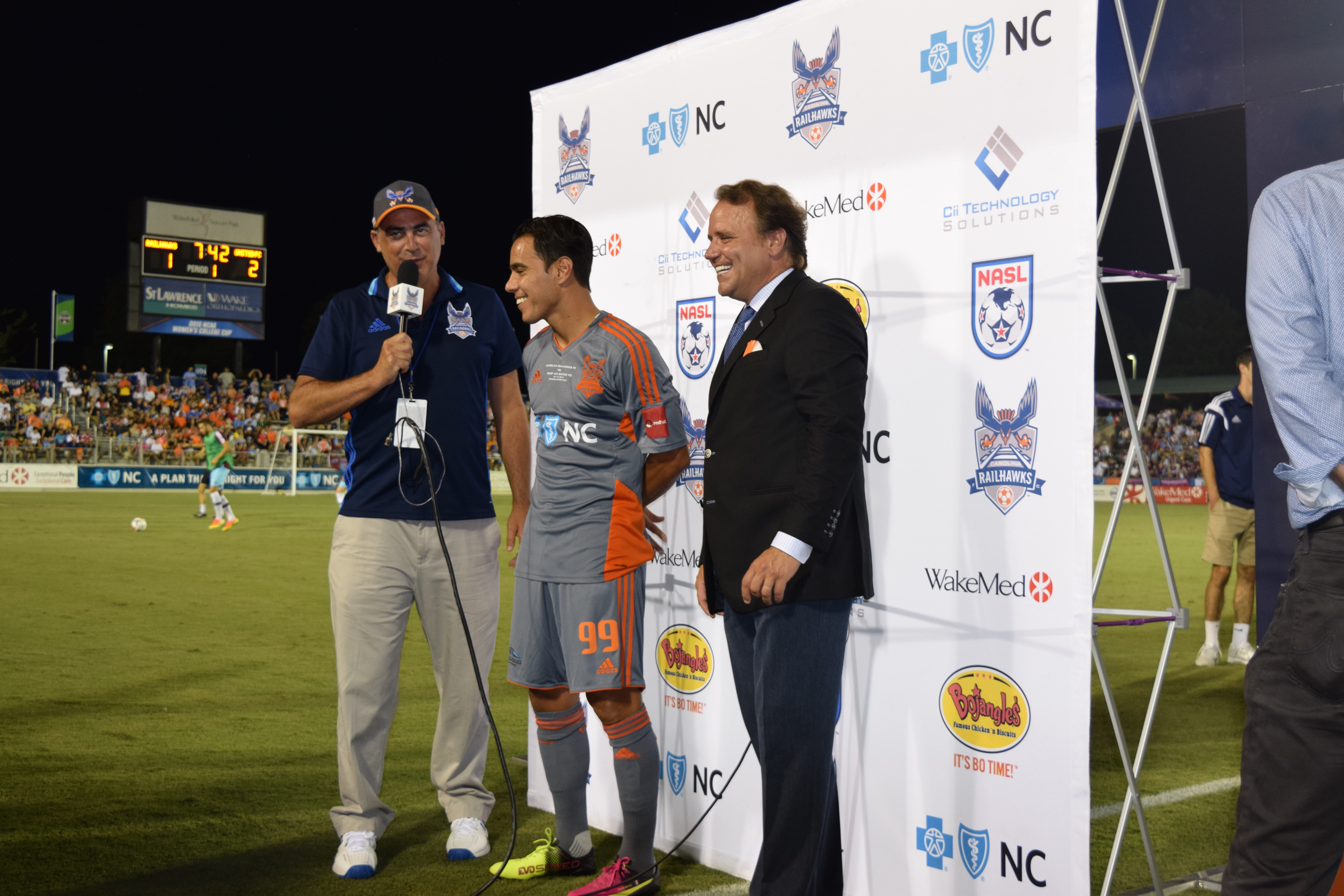
Bravo with Carolina Railhawks in 2016

On 13 July 2016, it was announced that Bravo had signed with NASL club Carolina RailHawks during halftime of a match against West Ham United, becoming the first Mexican player to join the club.

==== Loan to Phoenix Rising FC ====
On 9 February 2017, it was announced that Bravo had signed with recently re-branded USL club Phoenix Rising FC (formerly Arizona United). In September, Bravo would no longer be an active player for the club.

=== Leones Negros UdeG ===
On July 4, 2019, Leones Negros announced that Bravo would be a guest player for the 45th anniversary game against Monterrey on July 13 and a friendly against USL League One side Forward Madison FC on July 16. On July 24 it was announced that Bravo would come out of retirement to play for the following season.

== International career ==
Bravo played for various levels of the Mexico youth national system and in several amateur tournaments, including the 2004 Summer Olympics in Athens.

On 11 June 2006, playing at the 2006 FIFA World Cup in Germany, Bravo scored two goals in Mexico's 3–1 victory over Iran and was named the Man of the Match. Two matches later, he missed a penalty against Portugal in a 2–1 loss for Mexico, and did not play in the round-of-16 match against Argentina.

In 2007, Bravo was selected by former coach Hugo Sánchez to represent his country in a series of friendly international matches and to take part in the 2007 Gold Cup and 2007 Copa América, where he scored three goals.

Bravo also played in World Cup Qualifiers and in the 2009 CONCACAF Gold Cup. He was recalled to the national team in March 2013.

== Managerial career ==
In January 2024, Bravo became manager for National Independent Soccer Association club Arizona Monsoon FC. He left the club during the offseason.

== Personal life ==
Bravo appears on the North American cover of FIFA 06 alongside Ronaldinho and Freddy Adu.

=== Allegations of sexual abuse of a minor ===
Bravo was arrested on 4 October 2025 in Zapopan, Jalisco by police on allegations of sexual abuse of a minor. He was formally indicted the following day, accused of abusing the 17-year-old daughter of his girlfriend over the past six years.

On 10 October 2025, a judge ruled that Bravo will stand trial for the charge of child sexual abuse, and ordered a minimum of six-month pre-trial detention due to the risks involving bail in a case of sexual abuse. If convicted, Bravo faces a sentence between five and 10 years in prison.

== Career statistics ==
=== International goals ===
#	Date	Venue	Opponent	Score	Result	Competition
1	July 20, 2003	Estadio Azteca, Mexico City, Mexico	Jamaica	1–0	5–0	2003 CONCACAF Gold Cup
2	February 14, 2004	The Home Depot Center, Carson, United States	Chile	1–1	1–1	Friendly
3	March 10, 2004	Estadio Víctor Manuel Reyna, Tuxtla Gutiérrez, Mexico	Ecuador	2–0	2–1	Friendly
4	July 10, 2005	Los Angeles Memorial Coliseum, Los Angeles, United States	Guatemala	4–0	4–0	2005 CONCACAF Gold Cup
5	March 29, 2006	Soldier Field, Chicago, United States	Paraguay	1–1	2–1	Friendly
6	March 29, 2006	Soldier Field, Chicago, United States	Paraguay	2–1	2–1	Friendly
7	May 5, 2006	Rose Bowl, Pasadena, United States	Venezuela	1–0	1–0	Friendly
8	June 11, 2006	EasyCredit-Stadion, Nuremberg, Germany	Iran	1–0	3–1	2006 FIFA World Cup
9	June 11, 2006	EasyCredit-Stadion, Nuremberg, Germany	Iran	2–1	3–1	2006 FIFA World Cup
10	March 28, 2007	McAfee Coliseum, Oakland, United States	Ecuador	3–2	4–2	Friendly
11	July 1, 2007	Estadio Monumental de Maturín, Maturín, Venezuela	Ecuador	2–0	2–1	2007 Copa America
12	July 8, 2007	Estadio Monumental de Maturín, Maturín, Venezuela	Paraguay	6–0	6–0	2007 Copa América
13	July 14, 2007	Estadio Olímpico, Caracas, Venezuela	Uruguay	2–1	3–1	2007 Copa América
14	September 10, 2008	Estadio Víctor Manuel Reyna, Tuxtla Gutiérrez, Mexico	Canada	1–0	2–1	2010 FIFA World Cup qualification
15	March 28, 2009	Estadio Azteca, Mexico City, Mexico	Costa Rica	1–0	2–0	2010 FIFA World Cup qualification

== Honours ==
Guadalajara

- Mexican Primera División: Apertura 2006
- Copa MX: Apertura 2015
- Supercopa MX: 2016

Deportivo La Coruña

- UEFA Intertoto Cup: 2008

Sporting Kansas City

- Eastern Conference Regular Season: 2011

Mexico

- CONCACAF Gold Cup: 2003, 2009

Individual

- Mexican Primera División Best Rookie: Apertura 2002
- Mexican Primera División Best Forward: 2004–05, Apertura 2006, Clausura 2007
- Mexican Primera División Golden Boot: Clausura 2007
- CONCACAF Champions Cup Golden Boot: 2007
- MLS All-Star: 2011
- MLS Latino Player Of The Year: 2011

Records

- Guadalajara All Time Scorer: 132 goals
