= Liborio Sánchez =

Mexican footballer (born 1989)

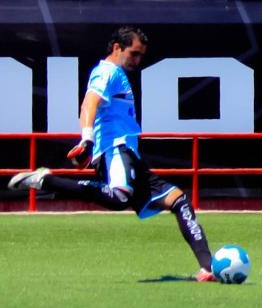
- Sánchez playing for Querétaro

Personal information
- Full name: Liborio Vicente Sánchez Ledesma
- Date of birth: 9 October 1989 (age 37)
- Place of birth: Guadalajara, Jalisco, Mexico
- Height: 1.83 m (6 ft 0 in)
- Position: Goalkeeper

Team information
- Current team: Aurora
- Number: 22

Youth career
- 2007–2010: Guadalajara

Senior career*
Years	Team	Apps	(Gls)
2007–2009	Tapatio	21	(0)
2010–2013	Guadalajara	4	(0)
2010–2011	→ Veracruz (loan)	29	(0)
2011–2012	→ Querétaro (loan)	34	(0)
2013–2014	Querétaro	0	(0)
2014	→ Delfines (loan)	12	(0)
2014–2016	Toluca	3	(0)
2016–2017	Chiapas	6	(0)
2017	→ Tapachula (loan)	8	(0)
2017	Alianza Petrolera	4	(0)
2019	Chiantla	21	(0)
2019–2020	Iztapa	47	(0)
2021–2023	Xinabajul	43	(0)
2023	San Pedro	0	(0)
2024	Municipal Grecia	16	(0)
2024	Deportivo Coatepeque	0	(0)
2025–	Aurora	0	(0)

International career
2009	Mexico U20	1	(0)
2012	Mexico U23	6	(0)
Medal record
Men's football
Representing Mexico
Olympic Qualifying Championship
Winner	2012 United States
Toulon Tournament
Winner	2012 France	Team
- * Club domestic league appearances and goals as of 8 December 2022

Liborio Vicente Sánchez Ledesma (Note: In this Spanish name, the first or paternal surname is Sánchez and the second or maternal family name is Ledesma.) (born 9 October 1989) is a Mexican professional footballer who plays as a goalkeeper for Liga Bantrab club Aurora.

== Club career ==
He was one of the young promises of the C.D. Guadalajara and has played very well with the first team in the 2010 Copa Libertadores. Sánchez was loaned to Veracruz for the Apertura 2010 and Clausura 2011 seasons, and after returning he was loaned again to Querétaro for the Apertura 2011 and Clausura 2012 seasons, he was a vital role to the team making the playoffs in the Apertura 2011 season and they reached the semifinals losing 1–0 in the global score to Tigres the eventual champions of the season.

== Honours ==
Mexico U23

- CONCACAF Olympic Qualifying Championship: 2012
- Toulon Tournament: 2012
