= Diego Andrade (footballer) =

Mexican footballer (born 1992)

Personal information
- Full name: Diego Alonso Andrade Torres
- Date of birth: 6 July 1992 (age 34)
- Place of birth: Guadalajara, Jalisco, Mexico
- Height: 1.73 m (5 ft 8 in)
- Position: Midfielder

Team information
- Current team: Querétaro

Youth career
- 2009: Toluca
- 2010: Querétaro

Senior career*
Years	Team	Apps	(Gls)
2013–	Querétaro	1	(0)
2014–2015	→ Irapuato (loan)	23	(9)
2016–	→ Cimarrones (loan)	8	(1)
- * Club domestic league appearances and goals as of December 6, 2017

Diego Alonso Andrade Torres (born July 6, 1992), known as Diego Andrade, is a Mexican professional footballer who plays for Cimarrones de Sonora on loan from Querétaro F.C.
