= Onay Pineda =

Mexican footballer (born 1989)

Personal information
- Full name: Onay Pineda Alvarado
- Date of birth: 16 June 1989 (age 37)
- Place of birth: Coyuca de Catalán, Guerrero, Mexico
- Height: 1.62 m (5 ft 4 in)
- Position: Right-back

Youth career
- 2010–2011: Querétaro

Senior career*
Years	Team	Apps	(Gls)
2011–2013	Querétaro	18	(0)
2013	→ León (loan)	2	(0)
2014–2015	BUAP	0	(0)
2015	Tapachula	0	(0)
- * Club domestic league appearances and goals

Onay Pineda Alvarado (born 16 June 1989) is a Mexican former professional footballer who played as a right-back.

== Club career ==
=== Querétaro ===
Pineda made his debut on 2 April 2011 in a match against San Luis. Onay Pineda retired due to a foot injury that didn't heal right

== Personal life ==
His younger brother, Orbelín Pineda, is also a professional footballer who currently plays as a midfielder for C.F. Monterrey.
