= Franco Niell =

Argentine football striker (born 1983)

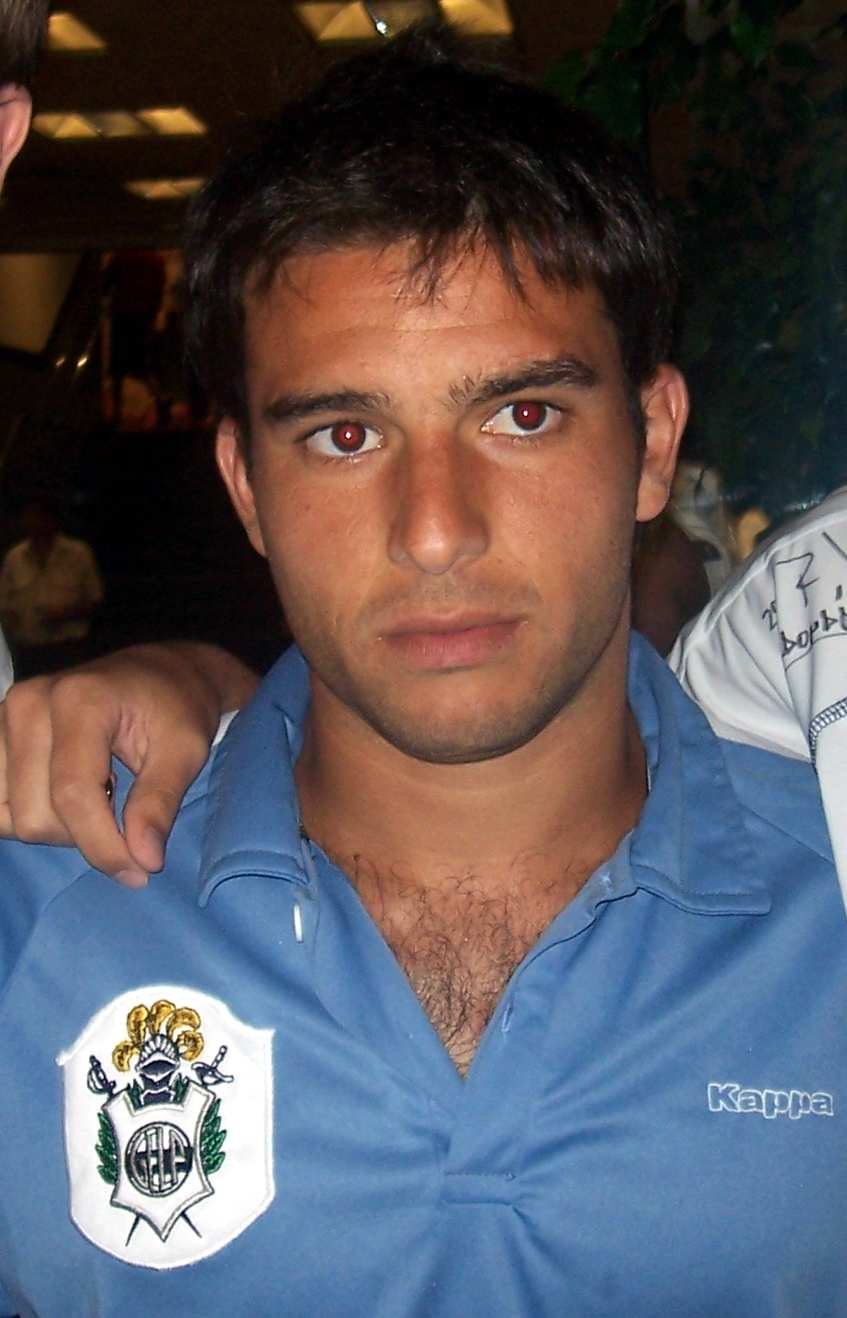

Personal information
- Full name: Franco Niell
- Date of birth: May 22, 1983 (age 43)
- Place of birth: Trelew, Argentina
- Height: 5 ft 4 in (1.63 m)
- Position: Forward

Youth career
- San Lorenzo de Almagro
- 2001–2004: Argentinos Juniors

Senior career*
Years	Team	Apps	(Gls)
2004–2012	Argentinos Juniors	75	(15)
2008	→ D.C. United (loan)	7	(0)
2008–2009	→ Gimnasia (loan)	29	(4)
2009–2010	→ Deportivo Quito (loan)	32	(2)
2011–2012	→ Querétaro (loan)	18	(3)
2012	Figueirense	0	(0)
2012–2013	Gimnasia	18	(5)
2013–2016	Rosario Central	67	(15)
2016–2018	Gimnasia	45	(7)
2018	Guillermo Brown	10	(1)
2019	Quilmes	7	(1)
2019–2020	Barracas Central	15	(3)
- * Club domestic league appearances and goals as of 23:24, 23 September 2020 (UTC)

Franco Niell (born May 22, 1983, in Trelew, Chubut) is an Argentine football striker.

== Career ==
Niell is of Scottish descent. Niell joined the Argentinos Juniors youth system in 2001, and debuted professionally on April 12, 2004. In his first match he came on as a substitute for Gustavo Oberman, and scored a goal in the 3–1 victory over Colón de Santa Fe.

On January 22, 2008, he signed on loan with D.C. United. His first appearance for United was against Harbour View FC in the 2008 CONCACAF Champions Cup. On June 26, 2008, he was waived by D.C. United.

On July 12, 2009, coming from the bench in the 18 m. of the ST, he scored arguably two of the most important goals of his career when he scored 2 goals with his team Gimnasia La Plata in the last minutes of the game (44 & 46 ST), goals that allowed Gimnasia to remain in the first division of the Argentinian League. Gimmnasia was playing with 9 men and needed 2 goals to keep the category against Atlético de Rafaela, team that did beat them 3–0 in the first match. The two goals were headers.

In 2009 Niell was loaned to Deportivo Quito of Ecuador, and in 2011 he was loaned back to Querétaro F.C. of Mexico.
