= Manuel López Mondragón =

Mexican footballer (born 1983)

Manuel López Mondragon
Personal information
- Full name: Manuel Ernesto López Mondragon
- Date of birth: 22 February 1983 (age 43)
- Place of birth: Veracruz, Mexico
- Height: 1.73 m (5 ft 8 in)
- Position: Defender

Senior career*
Years	Team	Apps	(Gls)
2002–2011	Veracruz	107	(1)
2008–2010	→ Puebla (loan)	28	(0)
2011–2013	Querétaro	33	(0)
2013	→ Lobos BUAP (loan)	13	(0)
2014–2016	UAT	25	(1)
2017–2019	Venados F.C.	45	(1)
2020	Atlético Veracruz	0	(0)
- * Club domestic league appearances and goals

Manuel Ernesto López Mondragón (born 22 February 1983) is a Mexican former football player.

== Career ==
López Mondragón started his career with Veracruz. During his playing time there, he was considered as a starter due to his great defending abilities.

He played with Atlético Veracruz of the Liga de Balompié Mexicano during the league's inaugural season, leading them to a runners-up finish after losing to Chapulineros de Oaxaca in the finals.
