= José Pérez (Chilean footballer) =

Chilean footballer (born 1985)

Personal information
- Full name: José Eduardo Pérez Ferrada
- Date of birth: 28 July 1985 (age 41)
- Place of birth: Concepción, Chile
- Height: 1.69 m (5 ft 6 1/2 in)
- Position: Attacking midfielder

Senior career*
| Years | Team | Apps | (Gls) |
| 2004–2008 | Fernández Vial | ? | (?) |
| 2008–2009 | Potros Chetumal | 24 | (3) |
| 2009–2012 | Huachipato | 55 | (8) |
| 2011 | → Unión Española (loan) | 13 | (0) |
| 2012 | → Querétaro (loan) | 6 | (0) |
| 2012–2015 | Cobreloa | 64 | (4) |
| 2015–2016 | U. de Concepción | 10 | (0) |
| 2017 | Rangers | 30 | (3) |
| 2018–2019 | Deportes Puerto Montt | 11 | (2) |
- * Club domestic league appearances and goals as of 29 March 2020

José Eduardo Pérez Ferrada (born 28 July 1985) is a Chilean footballer as an attacking midfielder.

== Career ==
After playing several years in the Chilean Primera División, Perez signed with Mexican Primera División side Querétaro F.C. on a six-month loan in December 2011.
