= Marco Antonio Jiménez =

Mexican footballer (born 1981)

Personal information
- Full name: Marco Antonio Jiménez González
- Date of birth: 2 March 1981 (age 45)
- Place of birth: Ciudad Guzmán, Jalisco, México
- Height: 1.65 m (5 ft 5 in)
- Position: Defensive midfielder

Senior career*
Years	Team	Apps	(Gls)
2002	Real Sociedad de Zacatecas	11	(1)
2003–2004	C.D. Tapatío	34	(2)
2004–2005	Celaya FC	31	(1)
2005–2006	CD Veracruz	18	(0)
2006–2017	Querétaro FC	226	(3)
2007	→ Celaya FC (loan)	1	(0)
2010	→ Club Tijuana (loan)	16	(0)
2010–2011	→ U. de G. (loan)	32	(2)
- * Club domestic league appearances and goals

Marco Antonio Jiménez González (Note: In this Spanish name, the first or paternal surname is Jiménez and the second or maternal family name is González.) (born 2 March 1981) is a Mexican former football midfielder. He played for Querétaro FC, and made his professional debut with Veracruz in 2005.

== Trivia ==
Marco Jiménez scored the first goal for Querétaro FC since they returned to the Primera División de México. It was against CF Pachuca on July 31, 2009, during the Clausura 2009 tournament.

== Honours ==
=== Club ===
Querétaro

- Copa MX: Apertura 2016
- Supercopa MX: 2017
