= Raúl Rico =

Mexican footballer (born 1981)

Personal information
- Full name: Raúl Rico Ramírez
- Date of birth: 12 April 1981 (age 45)
- Place of birth: Guadalajara, Jalisco, Mexico
- Height: 1.78 m (5 ft 10 in)
- Position: Defender

Team information
- Current team: Tapatío (Assistant)

Senior career*
Years	Team	Apps	(Gls)
2002–2004	Querétaro	43	(0)
2004	Irapuato	15	(0)
2004–2005	Colima	36	(2)
2005–2006	Querétaro	36	(1)
2006	Gallos Caliente	1	(0)
2006–2007	Querétaro	13	(0)
2007	Celaya	6	(0)
2007–2015	Querétaro	77	(0)
2012–2013	→ Veracruz (loan)	30	(0)
2013–2014	→ Delfines (loan)	5	(0)
2015–2016	Sonora	28	(0)

Managerial career
- 2018–2020: UdeG (Liga TDP)
- 2020–2021: River Plate Escuela Jalisco
- 2021–2023: UdeG (Liga TDP)
- 2024–2025: Atlético La Paz
- 2025–: Tapatío (Assistant)
Medal record
Representing Mexico
Men's Football
Central American and Caribbean Games
Silver medal – second place	2002 San Salvador	Team competition
- * Club domestic league appearances and goals

Raúl Rico Ramírez (born April 12, 1981) is a Mexican football coach and a former defender

== Biography ==
Player from the youth squads of Querétaro, Rico has stayed most of his career on the Liga de Ascenso.
