= Jorge Ibarra =

Mexican footballer (born 1988)

Personal information
- Full name: Jorge José Ibarra Sánchez
- Date of birth: 29 August 1988 (age 38)
- Place of birth: Guadalajara, Jalisco, Mexico
- Height: 1.70 m (5 ft 7 in)
- Position: Midfielder

Youth career
- 2007–2009: Querétaro

Senior career*
Years	Team	Apps	(Gls)
2009–2013	Querétaro	45	(0)
2010	→ Irapuato (loan)	18	(0)
2012	→ Altamira (loan)	10	(0)
2013–2014	Delfines	28	(3)
2014–2019	Lobos BUAP	85	(4)
2018	→ Sinaloa (loan)	18	(0)
2019–2020	Venados	8	(0)
2022	Halcones de Querétaro	0	(0)
- * Club domestic league appearances and goals as of 22:07, 23 September 2019 (UTC)

Jorge José Ibarra Sánchez (born August 29, 1988) is a Mexican footballer who last played as a midfielder for Venados of Ascenso MX.

== Biography ==
Jorge Ibarra played in the youth squads of Querétaro.

== Honours ==
Lobos BUAP

- Ascenso MX: Clausura 2017
- Campeón de Ascenso: 2016-17
