= Adolfo Bautista =

Mexican footballer (born 1979)

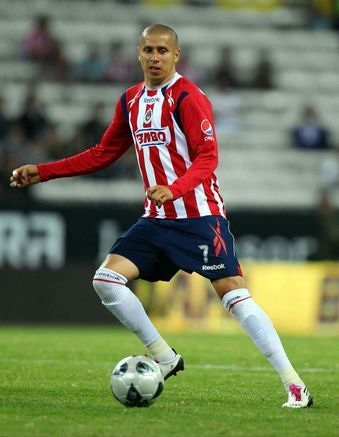
- Bautista with Guadalajara

Personal information
- Full name: Adolfo Bautista Marrufo
- Date of birth: 15 May 1979 (age 47)
- Place of birth: Dolores Hidalgo, Guanajuato, Mexico
- Height: 1.85 m (6 ft 1 in)
- Positions: Attacking midfielder; centre-forward

Senior career*
| Years | Team | Apps | (Gls) |
| 1998–2002 | Tecos UAG | 61 | (15) |
| 2002–2003 | Morelia | 45 | (19) |
| 2003 | Pachuca | 20 | (2) |
| 2004–2007 | Guadalajara | 131 | (42) |
| 2007–2009 | Chiapas | 69 | (22) |
| 2010–2011 | Guadalajara | 37 | (3) |
| 2011–2012 | Querétaro | 10 | (1) |
| 2013 | Atlético San Luis | 12 | (0) |
| 2014 | Chivas USA | 7 | (0) |
| 2014–2015 | Coras | 22 | (4) |
| 2015–2016 | Chicago Mustangs (indoor) | 11 | (18) |
| Total | | 425 | (126) |

International career
| 2002–2010 | Mexico | 38 | (11) |
Medal record
Representing Mexico
| Runner-up | CONCACAF Gold Cup | 2007 |
| Third place | Copa América | 2007 |
- * Club domestic league appearances and goals

Adolfo Bautista Marrufo (born May 15, 1979), also known as "Bofo", is a Mexican former professional footballer who played as an attacking midfielder and centre-forward.

Bautista is remembered for his powerful shot, creative ball control, and acrobatic moves, as well as for his extravagant style; especially his colorful hairstyles and unusual squad numbers. He played for a variety of teams, most notably for Guadalajara, as well as the Mexico national team. He also appeared in the 2010 FIFA World Cup representing Mexico.

Bautista oftentimes threw his cleats into the crowd as part of his goal celebration.

== Club career ==
=== Beginnings ===
Bautista played in amateur leagues in Dolores Hidalgo, San Diego de la Unión Guanajuato and San Miguel de Allende. Bautista made his professional debut on March 7, 1998, at the age of 18. He played with Tecos UAG from 1998 to 2002 where he scored 15 goals for the team in those four years. Bautista's first goal in the Mexican Championship against Necaxa on September 17, 2000, with Tecos losing 3–1.

In late 2002, Bautista was transferred to Monarcas Morelia where he scored 8 goals in 21 games and was one of the team's important players. He made a deadly frontline with Chilean footballer Reinaldo Navia where together they packed over 15 goals for the team. He played for Morelia for two seasons, appearing in the Apertura 2002, Clausura 2003 tournaments where the team came second place and reached the championship finals in two consecutive seasons.

In mid-2003, he was transferred to Pachuca where the expectations did not materialize, as he spent most of his time on the bench. In 19 games, he scored one goal against Chiapas and he struggled to find his form. Despite his poor performances, Pachuca still managed to reach the finals against Tigres of Monterrey. Tigres won the first leg 1–0 at home. Tigres began winning the match in the second leg, but Pachuca launched a great turnaround, and Pachuca won the match 3–1, with Bautista scoring the last goal of the match to secure his first title as a professional.

=== Guadalajara ===
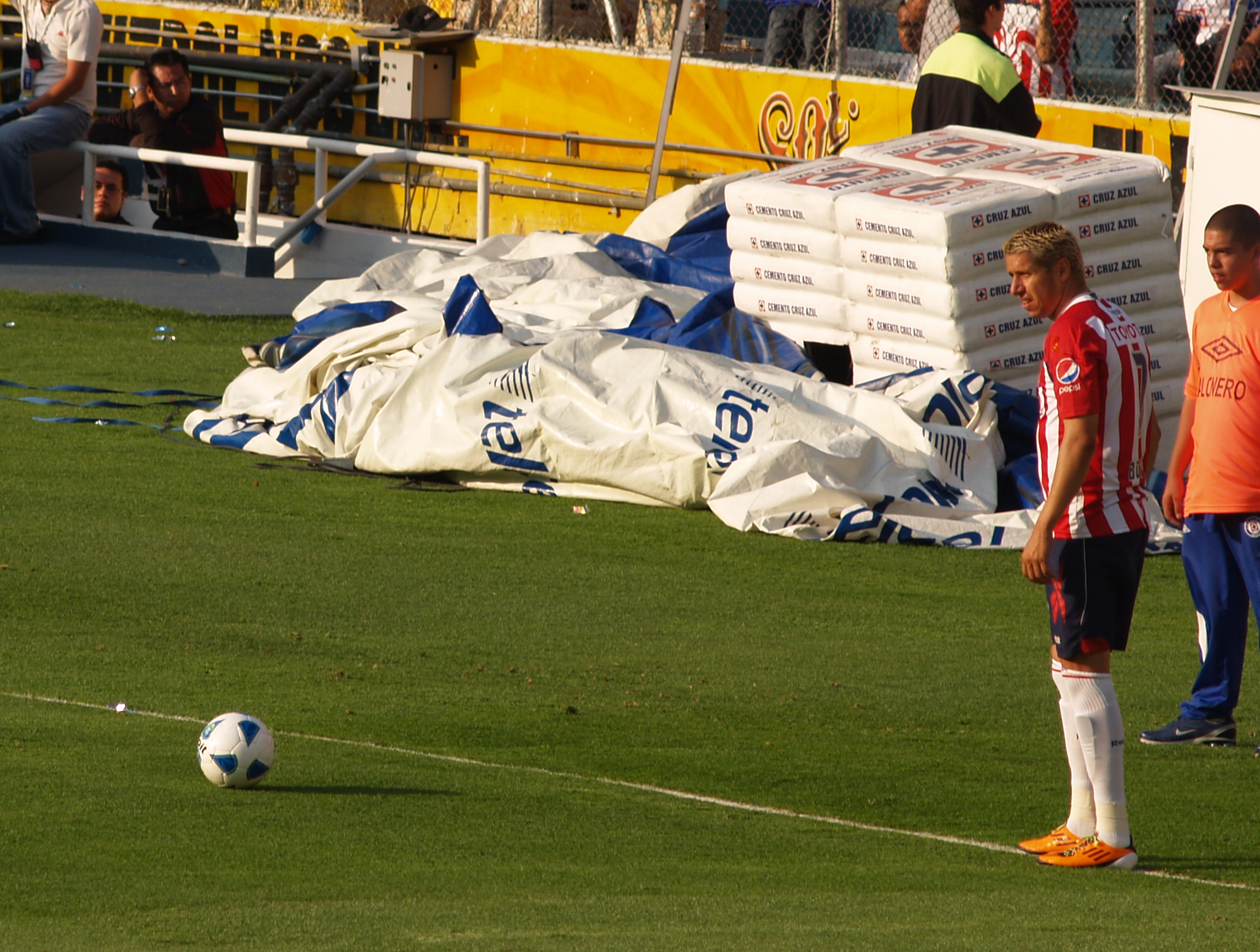
Bautista playing for Guadalajara

Bautista joined Guadalajara in 2004. In his first season, he scored nine goals in 19 games and was the team's top scorer.

In 2005, he participated in the Copa Libertadores and scored the last goal of the match with a long-range strike in their notorious 4–0 victory over Boca Juniors. The second leg was played at La Bombonera, which ended in a 0–0 draw. Chivas went on to the semi-finals and lost to Atletico Paranaense 5–2 on aggregate.

During the 2006 Apertura, Bautista scored seven goals to go along with his five assists. He also led Guadalajara to win the final against Deportivo Toluca, after scoring the championship winning goal. On June 11, 2007, Bautista was put on the Transfer list along with Diego Martínez (who fell out of favor with Vergara), after coach José Manuel de la Torre was not happy with his performance in the loss against rivals América in the 2007 Clausura semi-finals.

=== Chiapas ===
'Bofo' was sold to Chiapas on August 4, 2007, and played his first game with them in a 1–1 tie against Atlante. Bautista was given the number 1 (which is mostly used by goalkeepers). On October 31, 2007 'Bofo' scored his second goal with the team against Veracruz. Bofo helped the team get to the playoffs but they were eliminated by Cruz Azul in the quarter-finals.

One of Bofo's best seasons was in the 2008 Apertura where he finished as the 3rd top goal scorer with 9 goals, and was the only Mexican in the top 10 goal scorers. He could not play the beginning of the 2008 Clausura because of an injury. His first goal of the tournament came on March 7 in a match against his former team Chivas de Guadalajara. In the 2009 Apertura he played only 8 of 17 matches and scored one goal.

=== Return to Guadalajara ===
On December 15, 2009, Bautista rejoined Guadalajara after signing a three-year contract. Bautista played in both legs of the 2010 Copa Libertadores finals, and scored the opening goal in the first leg, but Chivas eventually lost to Internacional on aggregate. In 2011, he was placed on the transfer list.

=== Querétaro ===
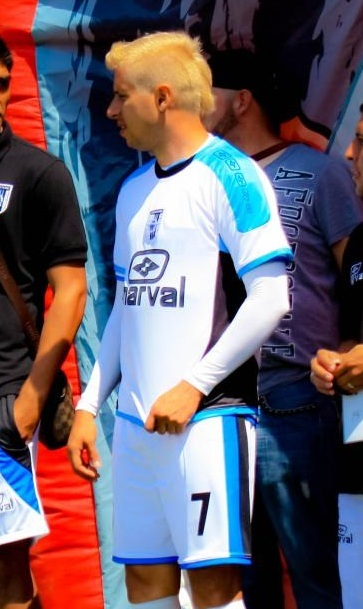
Bautista with Queretaro in 2011

Bautista was loaned to Querétaro, the reason being that he could have more playing time since Guadalajara debuted many new youngsters from their youth squad. He scored his first goal in a 3–0 win against Estudiantes Tecos. Bautista left the club after the season.

=== Atlético San Luis ===
Bautista joined newly founded club Atlético San Luis during the summer of 2013. In his short stay at the club Bautista made twelve appearances and did not score.

=== Chivas USA ===
On January 14, 2014, Bautista signed with Chivas USA in Major League Soccer.

=== Coras Tepic ===
In June 2014, Bautista signed with Deportivo Tepic F.C.

=== Chicago Mustangs ===
On December 4, 2015, Bautista signed with the professional indoor club, Chicago Mustangs. Bautista left the club in 2016 after Chicago Mustangs failed to pay his wages.

In June 2017, Bautista announced his official retirement from football. In his press conference he confirmed he was having a match of farewell on July 1, 2017, in the Estadio Jalisco, the former stadium of his boyhood club C.D. Guadalajara. He will team up with former teammates against current and former Liga MX players, and Guadalajara gave him permission to use the official home kits from the 2017 season.

== International career ==
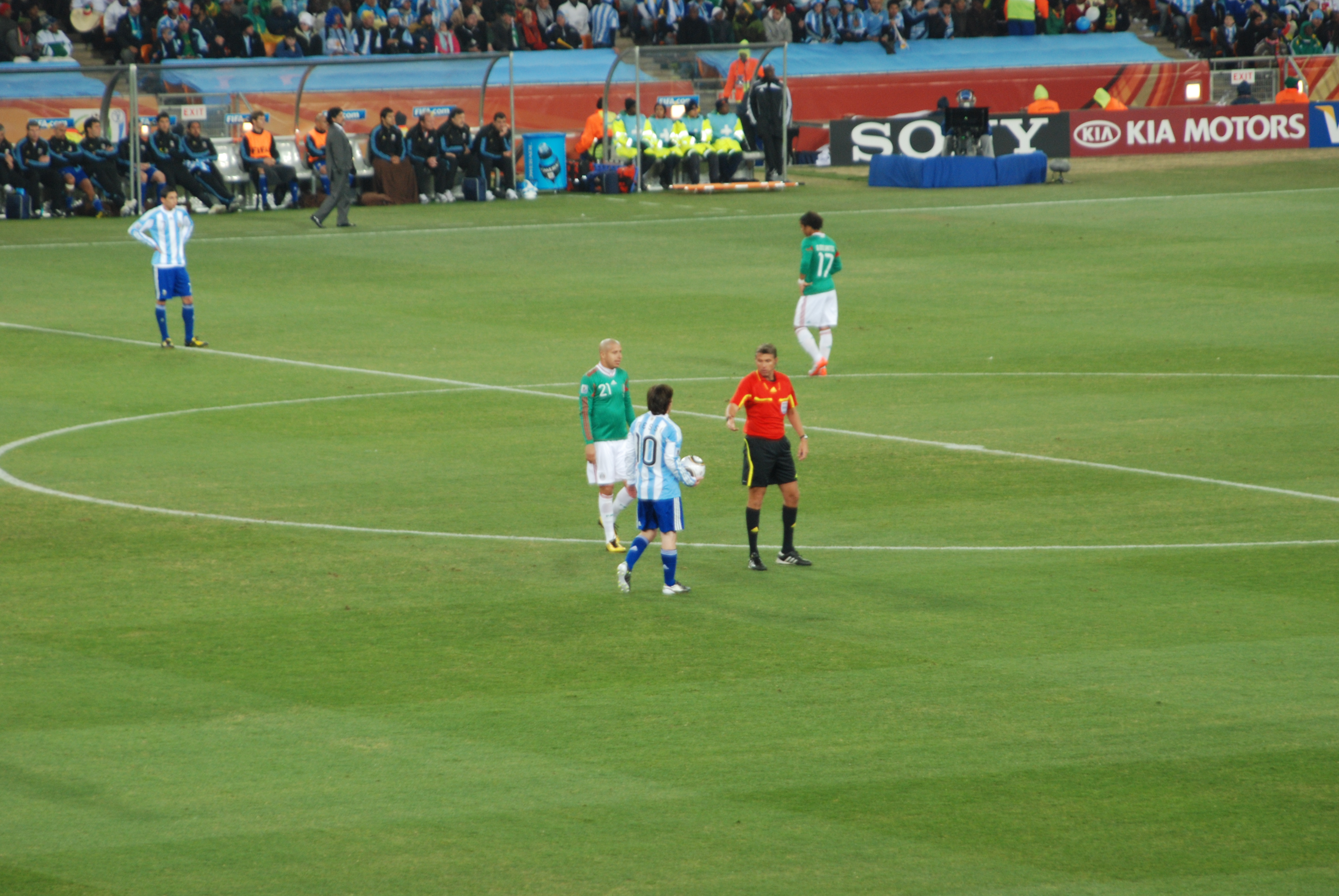
Bautista (#21 jersey) playing against Argentina at the 2010 FIFA World Cup

Bautista made his debut with the senior national team in 2002. He also was part of the 23-man squad at the 2010 World Cup in South Africa.

== Controversies ==
Apart from Bautista’s flamboyant playing style, Bautista was labeled as a provocative and controversial player.

One of his first major controversies was during the 2005 Copa Libertadores where Guadalajara faced Boca Juniors in one of the most hostile matches in Libertadores history. The first leg finished 4-0 where Bautista scored the last goal. In the second leg in Buenos Aires, the game ended in a 0–0 draw but during the match, Bautista was elbowed by Raúl Alfredo Cascini. After that, Bautista got up and showed four fingers to the Boca crowd, making a reference to Boca's loss in the first leg. Moments later, Martín Palermo ran up to him and headbutted him. Both Palermo and Bautista were red carded for the incident. However, as Bautista was walking off the pitch, a Boca fan attempted to punch him, and Boca coach Jorge José Benítez was caught on tape spitting in his face.

Also in 2005, during a league match, Guadalajara were facing Atlas in a Clásico Tapatío, where Bofo scored a goal and refused to celebrate. Outraged by his cocky behavior, Atlas players soon started pushing Bautista and he was shown a yellow card. Bautista went on to state that, “Atlas is an insignificant team”.

In October 2024, following the mid-season departure of former Guadalajara manager Fernando Gago, Bautista criticized Gago for leaving the team mid-season to manage Boca Juniors. Bautista called Gago a “piece of trash”. Bautista then posted a story to his personal Instagram account where he stated that Gago is a “mercenary” and that Gago made the decision to “join a small team”. Along with these claims, Bofo posted a video of his goal against Boca Juniors from the 2005 Copa Libertadores, in which Gago was playing for Boca Juniors in the same match.

== Career statistics ==
=== International ===
Appearances and goals by national team and year
| National team | Year | Apps | Goals |
|---|---|---|---|
| Mexico | 2002 | 5 | 3 |
| Mexico | 2003 | 4 | 0 |
| Mexico | 2004 | 7 | 5 |
| Mexico | 2005 | 1 | 0 |
| Mexico | 2006 | 1 | 0 |
| Mexico | 2007 | 11 | 1 |
| Mexico | 2008 | 2 | 0 |
| Mexico | 2010 | 7 | 2 |
| Total | | 38 | 11 |

Scores and results list Mexico's goal tally first, score column indicates score after each Bautista goal.

List of international goals scored by Adolfo Bautista
| No. | Date | Venue | Opponent | Score | Result | Competition | Ref. |
|---|---|---|---|---|---|---|---|
| 1 | 20 January 2002 | Rose Bowl, Pasadena, United States | Guatemala | 1–0 | 3–1 | 2002 CONCACAF Gold Cup | |
| 2 | 13 March 2002 | Qualcomm Stadium, San Diego, United States | Albania | 3–0 | 4–0 | Friendly | |
| 3 | 13 March 2002 | Qualcomm Stadium, San Diego, United States | Albania | 4–0 | 4–0 | Friendly | |
| 4 | 19 June 2004 | Alamodome, San Antonio, United States | Dominica | 1–0 | 10–0 | 2006 FIFA World Cup qualification | |
| 5 | 19 June 2004 | Alamodome, San Antonio, United States | Dominica | 5–0 | 10–0 | 2006 FIFA World Cup qualification | |
| 6 | 27 June 2004 | Estadio Victoria, Aguascalientes, Mexico | Dominica | 1–0 | 8–0 | 2006 FIFA World Cup qualification | |
| 7 | 27 June 2004 | Estadio Victoria, Aguascalientes, Mexico | Dominica | 4–0 | 8–0 | 2006 FIFA World Cup qualification | |
| 8 | 13 July 2004 | Estadio Miguel Grau, Callao, Peru | Ecuador | 2–0 | 2–1 | 2004 Copa América | |
| 9 | 28 March 2007 | Oakland Coliseum, Oakland, United States | Ecuador | 4–2 | 4–2 | Friendly | |
| 10 | 30 May 2010 | Hans-Walter-Wild-Stadion, Bayreuth, Germany | Gambia | 3–0 | 5–1 | Friendly | |
| 11 | 30 May 2010 | Hans-Walter-Wild-Stadion, Bayreuth, Germany | Gambia | 4–1 | 5–1 | Friendly | |

== Honours ==
Pachuca

- Mexican Primera División: Apertura 2003

Guadalajara

- Mexican Primera División: Apertura 2006
