= Israel Martínez =

Mexican footballer (born 1967)

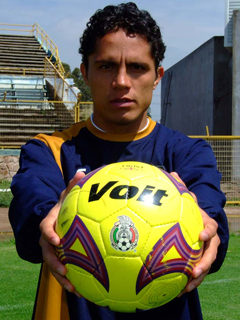

Personal information
- Full name: José Israel Martínez Salas
- Date of birth: 14 March 1981 (age 45)
- Place of birth: Mexico City, Mexico
- Height: 1.70 m (5 ft 7 in)
- Position: Midfielder

Senior career*
Years	Team	Apps	(Gls)
2003–2004	América	10	(1)
2004–2009	San Luis	135	(11)
2009–2011	América	45	(0)
2011–2012	Querétaro	28	(4)
2012–2013	Atlante	23	(0)
2013–2014	Veracruz	12	(0)
2015	Celaya F.C.	4	(0)

International career
2008–2010	Mexico	8	(0)
Medal record
Representing Mexico
CONCACAF Gold Cup
Winner	CONCACAF Gold Cup	2009
- * Club domestic league appearances and goals as of 5 May 2013

José Israel Martínez Salas (Note: In this Spanish name, the first or paternal surname is Martínez and the second or maternal family name is Salas.) (born 14 March 1981) is a Mexican former professional footballer who played as a midfielder. He was recently brought back to the team that saw him grow up, América, after playing for 5 years with San Luis.
