= Darío Romo =

Mexican footballer (born 1988)

Personal information
- Full name: Javier Darío Romo Barrón
- Date of birth: 6 January 1988 (age 38)
- Place of birth: Ahome, Sinaloa, México
- Height: 1.85 m (6 ft 1 in)
- Position: Goalkeeper

Youth career
- 2005–2008: Guadalajara

Senior career*
Years	Team	Apps	(Gls)
2009	Petroleros de Salamanca	15	(0)
2009–2010	América Manzanillo	23	(0)
2010	Unión de Curtidores	14	(0)
2011–2019	Querétaro	1	(0)
2013	→ Altamira (loan)	8	(0)
2015	→ Irapuato (loan)	0	(0)
2015–2017	→ Murciélagos (loan)	25	(0)
2018	→ Correcaminos UAT (loan)	2	(0)
2020	Correcaminos UAT	6	(0)
- * Club domestic league appearances and goals

Javier Darío Romo Barrón (Note: In this Spanish name, the first or paternal surname is Romo and the second or maternal family name is Barrón.) (born 6 January 1988) is a Mexican former professional footballer.
