= Diego García (footballer, born 1987) =

Mexican footballer

Personal information
- Full name: Diego García Hernández
- Date of birth: 21 March 1987 (age 39)
- Place of birth: Mexico City, Mexico
- Height: 1.83 m (6 ft 0 in)
- Position: Defender

Senior career*
Years	Team	Apps	(Gls)
2007–2008	Pioneros	20	(2)
2008–2010	Atlante	1	(0)
2011–2012	Querétaro	6	(0)
2013	Atlante	2	(0)
- * Club domestic league appearances and goals as of 5 August 2018

Diego García Hernández (born 21 March 1987) is a Mexican football defender who has played for Querétaro in the Primera División de México.

== Club career ==
He played for Atlante until 2010, although he only made one Primera Division appearance for them, against Santos Laguna on 9 May 2009.
