= Emilio López (Mexican footballer) =

Mexican footballer (born 1986)

Emilio López Navarro (born 10 May 1986 in Guadalajara) is a Mexican former professional footballer who last played for Venados on loan from Querétaro.
