= Michel Vázquez =

Mexican footballer (born 1990)

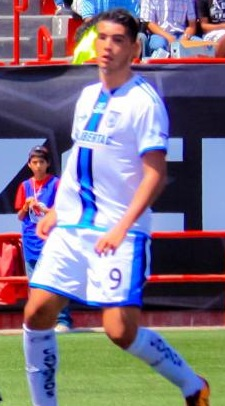
- Vázquez playing for Querétaro

Personal information
- Full name: Ricardo Michel Vázquez Guillén
- Date of birth: 15 May 1990 (age 36)
- Place of birth: Guadalajara, Jalisco, Mexico
- Height: 1.87 m (6 ft 2 in)
- Position: Forward

Senior career*
Years	Team	Apps	(Gls)
2010–2012	Guadalajara	16	(1)
2011	→ Querétaro (loan)	14	(3)
2012	→ Tecos (loan)	3	(0)
2013	Pumas Morelos	4	(1)
2013–2014	Delfines	20	(5)
2014	Lobos BUAP	11	(1)
2015	Veracruz	15	(1)
2015–2016	Guadalajara	14	(2)
2017	→ Celaya (loan)	9	(3)
2017–2018	Boyacá Chicó	17	(3)
2018	Leones Negros UdeG	3	(0)
2020	Chapulineros de Oaxaca	0	(0)

International career
2011	Mexico U23	1	(0)
- * Club domestic league appearances and goals as of 3 February 2019

Ricardo Michel Vázquez Guillén (Note: In this Spanish name, the first or paternal surname is Vázquez and the second or maternal family name is Guillén.) (born 15 May 1990) is a former Mexican professional footballer who last played as a forward for Leones Negros UdeG.

== Club career ==
=== Guadalajara ===
Vázquez was one of the most promising young prospects for Club Deportivo Guadalajara. In his third game with Chivas, he scored a goal against Club Libertad in the 2010 Copa Libertadores. He scored his first league goal for Chivas against tecos estudiantesin the Apertura 2010 season in a 3–0 victory for chivas. He has become a regular on the first team as a starter and as a substitute. He was fired from the team for not playing to expectation.

=== Querétaro F.C. ===
Vázquez was loaned to Querétaro F.C. for the Apertura 2011 season. He scored his first goal with Querétaro against C.F. Pachuca.

=== Return To Guadalajara ===
Vázquez returned to Guadalajara on Loan from BUAP. Vázquez scored his first goal of the season on 9 August 2015 against Tigres. He scored his second against pachuca to make the game 2-1 for guadalajara the game ended in a 4–4 tie

=== U-23 International appearances ===
As of 2 September 2011

International appearances
#	Date	Venue	Opponent	Result	Competition
1.	September 2, 2011	Estadio Alfonso Lastras, San Luis Potosí, Mexico	Chile	1–3	Friendly

== Honours ==
Guadalajara

- Copa MX: Apertura 2015
- Copa Libertadores runner-up: 2010
