= Christian Pérez (footballer, born 1990) =

Mexican footballer

Personal information
- Full name: Christian Alejandro Perez Vázquez
- Date of birth: 27 March 1990 (age 36)
- Place of birth: Guadalajara, Jalisco, Mexico
- Height: 1.85 m (6 ft 1 in)
- Position: Centre-back

Senior career*
Years	Team	Apps	(Gls)
2010–2012	Guadalajara	14	(0)
2011–2012	→ Querétaro (loan)	24	(1)
2013	Querétaro	6	(0)
2014	→ Delfines (loan)	12	(0)
2014–2016	Toluca	15	(0)
2017–2018	→ Cafetaleros (loan)	19	(0)
2018–2019	Juárez	5	(0)
2020–2024	Chapulineros de Oaxaca	0	(0)
- * Club domestic league appearances and goals as of 13 April 2019

Christian Alejandro Pérez Vázquez (Note: In this Spanish name, the first or paternal surname is Pérez and the second or maternal family name is Vázquez.) (born 27 March 1990) is a former Mexican footballer who last played as a centre-back for Chapulineros de Oaxaca.

== Career ==
Christian Perez debuted with Chivas on 5 February 2010 in a match against Querétaro FC, corresponding to Week 4 of the Bicentenario tournament in the 89th minute, replacing Alberto Medina.

He has also participated with the Mexico national football team in its lower divisions, with the U17 National Team three times in 2007.

== Honours ==
Guadalajara

- Copa Libertadores runner-up: 2010

Cafetaleros

- Ascenso MX: Clausura 2018

Chapulineros de Oaxaca

- Liga de Balompié Mexicano: 2021
