= Juan Antonio Ocampo =

Mexican footballer (born 1989)

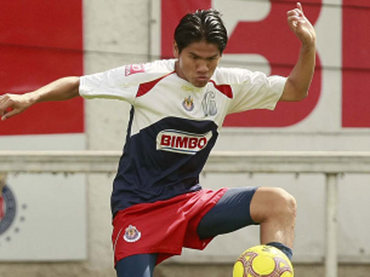
- Ocampo training with C.D. Guadalajara in 2012

Personal information
- Full name: Juan Antonio Ocampo Silva
- Date of birth: 11 June 1989 (age 37)
- Place of birth: Tepic, Nayarit, Mexico
- Height: 1.81 m (5 ft 11 in)
- Position: Defender

Senior career*
Years	Team	Apps	(Gls)
2008–2012	Guadalajara	16	(0)
2011–2012	→ Queretaro (loan)	21	(0)
2013	→ Dorados (loan)	7	(0)
2013–2014	→ Tecos (loan)	16	(0)
2014–2015	→ Tepic (loan)	9	(0)

International career
2009	Mexico U20	3	(0)
- * Club domestic league appearances and goals as of 4 August 2015

Juan Antonio Ocampo Silva (Note: In this Spanish name, the first or paternal surname is Ocampo and the second or maternal family name is Silva.) (born 11 June 1989) is a Mexican former football player who last played as a defender.

== International career ==
=== Mexico U-20 ===
Ocampo was capped twice for the Mexico U-20 squad, during the 2009 CONCACAF U-20 Championship held in Trinidad and Tobago.

== Honours ==
Guadalajara

- Copa Libertadores runner-up: 2010
