= Apertura 2012 Copa MX =

Tournament details
- Country: Mexico
- Teams: 28

Final positions
- Champions: Dorados de Sinaloa (1st title) (1st title)
- Runners-up: Correcaminos

Tournament statistics
- Matches played: 92
- Goals scored: 246 (2.67 per match)
- Top goal scorer: Juan de Dios Hernández (7 goals)

The Copa 2012 MX Apertura was the 68th staging of the Copa MX football tournament. This edition was the first played since the 1996–97 edition.

The tournament started on July 24, 2012, and concluded on October 31, 2012. In the final, Dorados de Sinaloa won the cup over Correcaminos 5–4 on penalties, after a 2–2 draw.

== Participants Apertura 2012 ==
This tournament will feature all the clubs from the Liga MX, excluding those that will participate in the 2012–13 CONCACAF Champions League (Santos, Tigres, Monterrey and Guadalajara) and 14 from the Ascenso MX (everyone except Cruz Azul Hidalgo).

Club	League	Stadium	Capacity
Altamira	Ascenso MX	Altamira	12,500
América	Liga MX	Azteca	114,000
Atlante	Liga MX	Andrés Quintana Roo	20,000
Atlas	Liga MX	Jalisco	56,713
Celaya	Ascenso MX	Miguel Alemán	25,000
Correcaminos	Ascenso MX	Marte R. Gómez	18,000
Cruz Azul	Liga MX	Azul	30,000
Dorados	Ascenso MX	Carlos González	21,325
Estudiantes Tecos	Ascenso MX	Tres de Marzo	30,000
Irapuato	Ascenso MX	Sergio León Chávez	25,000
Chiapas	Liga MX	Víctor Manuel Reyna	25,222
La Piedad	Ascenso MX	Juan N. López	15,700
León	Liga MX	Nou Camp	33,943
Lobos BUAP	Ascenso MX	Olímpico de C.U.	20,700
Mérida	Ascenso MX	Carlos Iturralde	24,000
Morelia	Liga MX	Morelos	41,056
Necaxa	Ascenso MX	Victoria	25,000
Neza	Ascenso MX	Neza 86	25,000
Pachuca	Liga MX	Hidalgo	25,000
Puebla	Liga MX	Cuauhtémoc	48,000
Pumas Morelos	Ascenso MX	Estadio Centenario	7,000
Querétaro	Liga MX	Corregidora	41,000
San Luis	Liga MX	Alfonso Lastras	28,000
Tijuana	Liga MX	Caliente	33,333
Toluca	Liga MX	Nemesio Díez	27,000
Pumas	Liga MX	Olímpico Universitario	68,954
Universidad de Guadalajara	Ascenso MX	Jalisco	56,713
Veracruz	Ascenso MX	Luis de la Fuente	30,000

== Tiebreakers ==
If two or more clubs are equal on points on completion of the group matches, the following criteria are applied to determine the rankings:

1. superior goal difference;
2. higher number of goals scored;
3. scores of the group matches played among the clubs in question;
4. higher number of goals scored away in the group matches played among the clubs in question;
5. best position in the Relegation table;
6. fair play ranking;
7. drawing of lots.

== Group stage ==
Every group is composed by four clubs, two from Liga MX and two from Ascenso MX. Instead of a traditional robin-round schedule, the clubs will play in three two-legged "rounds", the last one been contested by clubs of the same league.

Each win gives a club 3 points, each draw gives 1 point. An extra point is awarded for every round won; a round is won by aggregated score, and if it is a tie, the tiebreakers should be used.

Key to colours in group tables
Group winners advance to the Championship stage
Best runner-up also advances to the Championship stage

All times are UTC−05:00

=== Group 1 ===
Clubs from Liga MX: León and Morelia
Clubs from Ascenso MX: Dorados and Estudiantes
Channel: TVC Deportes

Team	Pld	W	D	L	RW	GF	GA	GD	Pts	DOR	MOR	LEO	EST
Dorados	6	4	0	2	1	10	13	−3	13		3–2	2–1	2–0
Morelia	6	2	3	1	3	14	6	+8	12	6–0		0–0	1–1
León	6	2	3	1	2	11	5	+6	11	4–0	2–2		1–1
Estudiantes	6	0	2	4	0	2	13	−11	2	0–3	0–3	0–3	

Legend: Blue = home team win; Yellow = draw; Red = away team win.

Round 1

July 24, 2012
19:00

Morelia	1–1	Estudiantes
Ochoa 55' (pen.)	Report	Lillingston 57'

Estadio Morelos, Morelia
Referee: Oscar Macías Romo
July 31, 2012
21:00

Estudiantes	0–3	Morelia
	Report	Sepúlveda 5'; Pedroza 72', 84'

Estadio Tres de Marzo, Zapopan
Referee: Oscar Bernardo Villagómez Gurria

Morelia won the round 4–1 on aggregated score

July 24, 2012
20:00

Dorados	2–1	León
Blanco 58'; Mena 69'	Report	Britos 84'

Estadio Carlos González, Culiacán
Referee: Mauricio Martínez Figueroa
July 31, 2012
19:00

León	4–0	Dorados
J. J. Calderón 17'; J. J. Vázquez 70'; González 80'; Nieves 87'	Report

Estadio Nou Camp, León
Referee: Miguel Ángel Ortega Rojas

León won the round 5–2 on aggregated score

Round 2

August 7, 2012
19:00

León	1–1	Estudiantes
A. Ortíz 14'	Report	Martiñones 32'

Estadio Nou Camp, León
Referee: Víctor Bisguerra Mendiola
August 21, 2012

Estudiantes	0–3	León
	Report	Arce 21', 54'; Pacheco 75'

Estadio Tres de Marzo, Zapopan

León won the round 4–1 on aggregated score

August 7, 2012
21:00

Dorados	3–2	Morelia
G. Ramírez 40'; Mena 60'; J. D. Hernández 90'	Report	Montero 51'; Rojas 54'

Estadio Carlos González, Culiacán
Referee: Óscar Bernardo Villagómez Gurría
August 21, 2012

Morelia	6–0	Dorados
Pedroza 15', 60'; Ochoa 25'; Montero 69', 70', 80'	Report

Estadio Morelos, Morelia

Morelia won the round 8–3 on aggregated score

Round 3

August 28, 2012
19:00

Dorados	2–0	Estudiantes
J. D. Hernández 11'; H. Velázquez 71'	Report

Estadio Carlos González, Culiacán
Referee: Arturo Cruz
September 18, 2012
19:00

Estudiantes	0–3	Dorados
	Report	J. D. Hernández 4', 62'; D. Mena 90'

Estadio Tres de Marzo, Zapopan
Attendance: 2,584
Referee: Jorge Luis Delgado Salas

Dorados won the round 5–0 on aggregated score

August 28, 2012
19:00

León	2–2	Morelia
O. Arce 29'; M. Britos 43'	Report	J. Rojas 46'; Á. Sepúlveda 62'

Estadio Nou Camp, León
Attendance: 19,980
Referee: Miguel Ángel Chacón Viveros
September 18, 2012
21:00

Morelia	0–0	León
	Report

Estadio Morelos, Morelia
Attendance: 8,109
Referee: Jorge Antonio Pérez Durán

Round tied 2–2. Morelia won the extra point by the away goal rule

=== Group 2 ===
Clubs from Liga MX: Atlas and Cruz Azul
Clubs from Ascenso MX: Altamira and Neza
Channel: ESPN Deportes

Team	Pld	W	D	L	RW	GF	GA	GD	Pts	NEZ	CRA	ALT	ATL
Neza	6	3	1	2	1	7	8	−1	11		2–1	2–1	2–1
Cruz Azul	6	2	2	2	2	6	4	+2	10	3–0		0–0	1–1
Altamira	6	2	2	2	2	6	6	0	10	1–0	0–1		3–2
Atlas	6	1	3	2	1	7	8	−1	7	1–1	1–0	1–1	

Legend: Blue = home team win; Yellow = draw; Red = away team win.

Round 1

July 25, 2012
21:00

Altamira	3–2	Atlas
Morales 18'; L. F. Sánchez 27'; Lillo 29'	Report	Barraza 4', 76'

Estadio Altamira, Altamira
Referee: León Vicente Barajas Anzures
July 31, 2012
21:00

Atlas	1–1	Altamira
F. Santos 73' (pen.)	Report	del Moral 56'

Estadio Jalisco, Guadalajara
Referee: Erim Ramírez Ulloa

Altamira won the round 4–3 on aggregated score

July 25, 2012
19:00

Cruz Azul	3–0	Neza
Giménez 23' (pen.); Lara 52'; J. Orozco 79'	Report

Estadio Azul, Mexico City
Referee: César Ramos
August 1, 2012
16:00

Neza	2–1	Cruz Azul
Reyes 9'; Mejía 69'	Report	J. Orozco 5'

Estadio Neza 86, Ciudad Nezahualcóyotl
Referee: Arturo Cruz Hurtado

Cruz Azul won the round 4–2 on aggregated score

Round 2

August 7, 2012
21:00

Altamira	0–1	Cruz Azul
	Report	J. Orozco 67' (pen.)

Estadio Altamira, Altamira
Referee: Marco Antonio Ortiz Nava
August 21, 2012

Cruz Azul	0–0	Altamira
	Report

Estadio Azul, Mexico City

Cruz Azul won the round 1–0 on aggregated score

August 8, 2012
21:00

Atlas	1–1	Neza
Bolaños 25'	Report	E. Guzmán 9'

Estadio Jalisco, Guadalajara
Referee: Luis Enrique Santander
August 22, 2012

Neza	2–1	Atlas
Sansores 9'; Loebschor 90+2'	Report	Barraza 11'

Estadio Neza 86, Ciudad Nezahualcóyotl

Neza won the round 3–2 on aggregated score

Round 3

August 28, 2012
21:00

Altamira	1–0	Neza
O. Fernández 83'	Report

Estadio Altamira, Altamira
Attendance: 1,436
Referee: Roberto Ríos Jácome
September 18, 2012
16:00

Neza	2–1	Altamira
R. Prieto 44'; D.Mejía 90+3'	Report	O. Fernández 4'

Estadio Neza 86, Ciudad Nezahualcóyotl
Referee: Arturo Cruz Hurtado

Round tied 2–2. Altamira won the extra point by the away goal rule

August 29, 2012
21:00

Atlas	1–0	Cruz Azul
J. Barraza 5'	Report

Estadio Jalisco, Guadalajara
Attendance: 8,524
Referee: Miguel Ángel Ortega Rojas
September 18, 2012
21:00

Cruz Azul	1–1	Atlas
J. Orozco 12'	Report	S. Santana 28' (pen.)

Estadio Azul, Mexico City
Attendance: 4,095
Referee: Víctor Bisguerra

Atlas won the round 2–1 on aggregated score

=== Group 3 ===
Clubs from Liga MX: Atlante and Pachuca
Clubs from Ascenso MX: La Piedad and Universidad de Guadalajara
Channel: TVC Deportes

Team	Pld	W	D	L	RW	GF	GA	GD	Pts	PAC	LPD	ATN	UDG
Pachuca	6	4	1	1	3	9	2	+7	16		1–1	1–0	3–0
La Piedad	6	2	3	1	2	8	6	+2	11	0–3		0–0	4–0
Atlante	6	1	3	2	1	3	4	−1	7	0–1	1–1		1–0
Universidad de Guadalajara	6	1	1	4	0	3	11	−8	4	1–0	1–2	1–1	

Legend: Blue = home team win; Yellow = draw; Red = away team win.

Round 1

July 25, 2012
19:00

Universidad de Guadalajara	1–0	Pachuca
Gómez 71' (pen.)	Report

Estadio Jalisco, Guadalajara
Referee: Jorge Luis Delgado Salas
August 1, 2012
21:00

Pachuca	3–0	Universidad de Guadalajara
Borja 11', 66'; L.A. Sanchez 48'	Report

Estadio Hidalgo, Pachuca
Referee: Miguel Ángel Flores Rodríguez

Pachuca won the round 3–1 on aggregated score

July 25, 2012
21:00

Atlante	1–1	La Piedad
Nápoles 47'	Report	Sánchez 52'

Estadio Andrés Quintana Roo, Cancún
Referee: Antony Zamjuampa Rojo
August 2, 2012
16:00

La Piedad	0–0	Atlante
	Report

Estadio Juan N. López, La Piedad
Referee: Erick Yair Miranda Galindo

Round tied 1–1. La Piedad won the extra point by the away goal rule

Round 2

August 7, 2012
21:00

Atlante	1–0	Universidad de Guadalajara
L. Rodríguez 86'	Report

Estadio Andrés Quintana Roo, Cancún
Referee: Óscar Macías Romo
August 21, 2012

Universidad de Guadalajara	1–1	Atlante
N. Díaz 72'	Report	L. Rodríguez 90+3'

Estadio Jalisco, Guadalajara

Atlante won the round 2–1 on aggregated score

August 8, 2012
16:00

La Piedad	0–3	Pachuca
	Report	A. Medina 43'; Mañon 73'; J. E. Gómez 83'

Estadio Juan N. López, La Piedad
Referee: Emerson Gustavo Zamora Ramírez
August 21, 2012

Pachuca	1–1	La Piedad
Herrera 75'	Report	E. Sánchez 68'

Estadio Hidalgo, Pachuca

Pachuca won the round 4–1 on aggregated score

Round 3

August 28, 2012
16:00

La Piedad	4–0	Universidad de Guadalajara
J. M. Cavallo 34', 35', 72' (pen.); R. Murguía 88'	Report

Estadio Juan N. López, La Piedad
Referee: Carlos Martínez Soto
September 18, 2012
19:00

Universidad de Guadalajara	1–2	La Piedad
J. Hurtado 75'	Report	O. Rojas 51'; F. Sinecio 59'

Estadio Jalisco, Guadalajara
Attendance: 3,500
Referee: Quetzalli Alvarado

La Piedad won the round 6–1 on aggregated score

August 29, 2012
21:00

Atlante	0–1	Pachuca
	Report	S. Almeida 86'

Estadio Andrés Quintana Roo, Cancún
Attendance: 2,700
Referee: Víctor Bisguerra Mendiola
September 19, 2012
21:00

Pachuca	1–0	Atlante
A. Medina 5'	Report

Estadio Hidalgo, Pachuca
Attendance: 7,500
Referee: Miguel Ángel Chacón Viveros

Pachuca won the round 2–0 on aggregated score

=== Group 4 ===
Clubs from Liga MX: Chiapas and San Luis
Clubs from Ascenso MX: Necaxa and Pumas Morelos
Channel: Fox Deportes

Team	Pld	W	D	L	RW	GF	GA	GD	Pts	NEC	SNL	PMR	JAG
Necaxa	6	3	2	1	3	9	4	+5	14		1–0	2–0	3–0
San Luis	6	3	2	1	2	8	5	+3	13	1–1		2–0	2–1
Pumas Morelos	6	1	2	3	1	6	9	−3	6	2–2	1–2		2–0
Chiapas	6	1	2	3	0	4	9	−5	5	1–0	1–1	1–1	

Legend: Blue = home team win; Yellow = draw; Red = away team win.

Round 1

July 24, 2012
19:00

Chiapas	1–0	Necaxa
Salazar 77'	Report

Estadio Víctor Manuel Reyna, Tuxtla Gutierrez
Referee: Fernando Guerrero Ramírez
July 31, 2012
19:00

Necaxa	3–0	Chiapas
Santoya 35', 38', 68'	Report

Estadio Victoria, Aguascalientes
Referee: Jorge Luis Delgado Salas

Necaxa won the round 3–1 on aggregated score

July 25, 2012
16:00

Pumas Morelos	1–2	San Luis
C. Campos 29'	Report	Mendoza 20'; Silva 43'

Estadio Centenario, Cuernavaca
Referee: Eduardo Galván Basalto
July 31, 2012
21:00

San Luis	2–0	Pumas Morelos
Tréllez 61'; Fernández 65'	Report

Estadio Alfonso Lastras, San Luis Potosí
Referee: Luis Enrique Santander

San Luis won the round 4–1 on aggregated score

Round 2

August 7, 2012
16:00

Pumas Morelos	2–0	Chiapas
C. Campos 36'; V. Rosales 50'	Report

Estadio Centenario, Cuernavaca
Referee: Carlos Manuel Martínez Soto
August 21, 2012

Chiapas	1–1	Pumas Morelos
Trujillo 44'	Report	Garay 45+2'

Estadio Víctor Manuel Reyna, Tuxtla Gutierrez

Pumas Morelos won the round 3–1 on aggregated score

August 7, 2012
21:00

San Luis	1–1	Necaxa
Tréllez 72'	Report	Cervantes 53'

Estadio Alfonso Lastras, San Luis Potosí
Referee: César Ramos
August 21, 2012

Necaxa	1–0	San Luis
Márquez 46'	Report

Estadio Victoria, Aguascalientes

Necaxa won the round 2–1 on aggregated score

Round 3

August 28, 2012
19:00

Necaxa	2–0	Pumas Morelos
Márquez 42', 69'	Report

Estadio Victoria, Aguascalientes
Referee: Mario Alcántara González
September 18, 2012
16:00

Pumas Morelos	2–2	Necaxa
D. Izazola 77', 78'	Report	H. Cervantes 28'; J. Isijara 45'

Estadio Centenario, Cuernavaca
Attendance: 1,397
Referee: Eduardo Galván Basulto

Necaxa won the round 4–2 on aggregated score

August 28, 2012
21:00

San Luis	2–1	Chiapas
E. Cerda 14'; D. Ordáz 33'	Report	J. Zárate 34'

Estadio Alfonso Lastras, San Luis Potosí
Attendance: 3,919
Referee: Antony Zanjuampa Rojo
September 19, 2012
19:00

Chiapas	1–1	San Luis
Y. Corona 54'	Report	C. Villaluz 90+3'

Estadio Víctor Manuel Reyna, Tuxtla Gutierrez
Referee: César Ramos

=== Group 5 ===
Clubs from Liga MX: América and Querétaro
Clubs from Ascenso MX: Correcaminos and Veracruz
Channel: TDN

Team	Pld	W	D	L	RW	GF	GA	GD	Pts	UAT	AME	QRO	VER
Correcaminos	6	3	2	1	2	12	13	−1	13		4–3	2–2	3–0
América	6	3	0	3	3	17	9	+8	12	6–0		4–1	3–1
Querétaro	6	2	2	2	1	10	10	0	9	1–2	1–0		2–2
Veracruz	6	1	2	3	0	6	13	−7	5	1–1	2–1	0–3	

Legend: Blue = home team win; Yellow = draw; Red = away team win.

Round 1

July 24, 2012
19:00

Querétaro	1–2	Correcaminos
Landín 80'	Report	I. Vázquez 49'; Nurse 65'

Estadio Corregidora, Querétaro
Referee: Víctor Bisguerra Mendiola
July 31, 2012
19:00

Correcaminos	2–2	Querétaro
Mora 77'; Pacheco 81'	Report	Tapia 57'; A. García 90+2'

Estadio Marte R. Gómez, Ciudad Victoria
Referee: Obed Eliud Gómez Barreras

Correcaminos won the round 4–3 on aggregated score

July 25, 2012
21:00

Veracruz	2–1	América
P. Torres 65'; L. Orozco 85'	Report	A. López 51'

Estadio Luis de la Fuente, Veracruz
Referee: Erick Yair Miranda Galindo
August 2, 2012
19:00

América	3–1	Veracruz
Rosinei 39'; Zúñiga 56'; Layún 57'	Report	Ruelas 30'

Estadio Azteca, Mexico City
Referee: Miguel Ángel Ayala Ramírez

América won the round 4–3 on aggregated score

Round 2

August 8, 2012
19:00

Veracruz	0–3	Querétaro
	Report	Tapia 6', 12', 24'

Estadio Luis de la Fuente, Veracruz
Referee: Mauricio Martínez Figueroa
August 21, 2012

Querétaro	2–2	Veracruz
Pulido 40'; Enríquez 54'	Report	Torres 74', 88'

Estadio Corregidora, Querétaro

Querétaro won the round 5–2 on aggregated score

August 14, 2012
21:00

Correcaminos	4–3	América
J. Mora 34'; Olivera 44'; Nurse 62'; Saucedo 82'	Report	Pimentel 22'; Layún 26'; A. López 32'

Estadio Marte R. Gómez, Ciudad Victoria
Referee: Baruch Absalón Castellanos
August 22, 2012

América	6–0	Correcaminos
Montenegro 51'; Cárdenas 54', 74'; Zúñiga 59', 76', 90'	Report

Estadio Azteca, Mexico City

América won the round 9–4 on aggregated score

Round 3

August 28, 2012
19:00

Veracruz	1–1	Correcaminos
M. Romero 87'	Report	Saucedo 51'

Estadio Luis de la Fuente, Veracruz
Referee: Eduardo Galván Basulto
September 18, 2012
21:00

Correcaminos	3–0	Veracruz
N. Olivera 20'; R. Nurse 52', 67'	Report

Estadio Marte R. Gómez, Ciudad Victoria
Attendance: 5,056
Referee: Roberto Ríos Jacomé

Correcaminos won the round 4–1 on aggregated score

August 29, 2012
21:00

América	4–1	Querétaro
A. López 1'; D. Montenegro 38' (pen.); M. Zúñiga 83'; J. Medina 91'	Report	D. Guastavino 57'

Estadio Azteca, Mexico City
Referee: Miguel Ángel Flores
September 19, 2012
19:00

Querétaro	1–0	América
D. Guastavino 57'	Report

Estadio Corregidora, Querétaro
Attendance: 14,700
Referee: Miguel Ángel Ortega Rojas

América won the round 4–2 on aggregated score

=== Group 6 ===
Clubs from Liga MX: Tijuana and Pumas
Clubs from Ascenso MX: Celaya and Mérida
Channel: TDN

Team	Pld	W	D	L	RW	GF	GA	GD	Pts	TIJ	MER	PUM	CEL
Tijuana	6	3	2	1	2	8	6	+2	13		0–0	2–1	2–1
Mérida	6	3	1	2	2	8	4	+4	12	0–1		3–1	3–0
Pumas	6	1	3	2	0	5	7	−2	6	2–2	1–0		0–0
Celaya	6	1	2	3	0	4	8	−4	5	2–1	1–2	0–0	

Legend: Blue = home team win; Yellow = draw; Red = away team win.

Round 1

July 24, 2012
19:00

Tijuana	0–0	Mérida
	Report

Estadio Caliente, Tijuana
Referee: Miguel Ángel Chacón Viveros
July 31, 2012
19:00

Mérida	0–1	Tijuana
	Report	Domínguez 50'

Estadio Carlos Iturralde, Mérida
Referee: Baruch Absalón Castellanos

Tijuana won the round 1–0 on aggregated score

July 25, 2012
19:00

Celaya	0–0	Pumas
	Report

Estadio Miguel Alemán, Celaya
Referee: Mario Alcántara González
July 31, 2012
21:00

Pumas	0–0	Celaya
	Report

Estadio Olímpico Universitario, Mexico City
Referee: Jorge Antonio Pérez Durán

Round tied 0–0. As both scores were the same, no extra point will be awarded

Round 2

August 8, 2012
21:00

Pumas	1–0	Mérida
Herrera 79'	Report

Estadio Olímpico Universitario, Mexico City
Referee: José Alfredo Peñaloza Soto
August 22, 2012

Mérida	3–1	Pumas
Jiménez 5'; Gómez 43'; Noya 87'	Report	Herrera 78'

Estadio Carlos Iturralde, Mérida

Mérida won the round 3–2 on aggregated score

August 14, 2012
19:00

Celaya	2–1	Tijuana
Pardini 30'; R. Ruíz 90+3' (o.g.)	Report	R. Nava 19'

Estadio Miguel Alemán, Celaya
Referee: Uriel Olvera Ríos
August 21, 2012

Tijuana	2–1	Celaya
Enríquez 13'; Ruíz 23'	Report	Pardini 20'

Estadio Caliente, Tijuana

Round tied 3–3. As both scores were the same, no extra point will be awarded

Round 3

August 28, 2012
19:00

Celaya	1–2	Mérida
J. C. Meza 74'	Report	Guadarrama 85'; E. Alfaro 87'

Estadio Miguel Alemán, Celaya
Attendance: 4,980
Referee: Jorge Tonix
September 18, 2012
19:00

Mérida	3–0	Celaya
M. Gómez 27'; S. Guadarrama 39'; A. Reyes 80'	Report

Estadio Carlos Iturralde, Mérida
Referee: LEON VICENTE BARAJAS ANZURES

Mérida won the round 5–1 on aggregated score

August 28, 2012
21:00

Pumas	2–2	Tijuana
Nieto 16'; L. García 44' (pen.)	Report	Martínez 41'; Tahuilán 90'

Estadio Olímpico Universitario, Mexico City
Attendance: 6,196
Referee: César Ramos
September 19, 2012
21:00

Tijuana	2–1	Pumas
Aguilar 18'; R. Enríquez 68'	Report	A. Nieto 33'

Estadio Caliente, Tijuana
Attendance: 18,432
Referee: Antony Zanjuampa Rojo

Tijuana won the round 4–3 on aggregated score

=== Group 7 ===
Clubs from Liga MX: Puebla and Toluca
Clubs from Ascenso MX: Irapuato and Lobos BUAP
Channel: SKY

Team	Pld	W	D	L	RW	GF	GA	GD	Pts	TOL	PUE	IRA	BUAP
Toluca	6	3	1	2	2	10	7	+3	12		2–0	4–1	1–3
Puebla	6	3	0	3	1	7	7	0	10	1–0		0–2	2–0
Irapuato	6	3	0	3	1	8	12	−4	10	0–1	3–2		2–1
Lobos BUAP	6	2	1	3	2	10	9	+1	9	2–2	0–2	4–0	

Legend: Blue = home team win; Yellow = draw; Red = away team win.

Round 1

July 24, 2012
21:00

Toluca	1–3	Lobos BUAP
É. Benítez 27'	Report	Lima 41', 54', 64'

Estadio Nemesio Díez, Toluca
Referee: Luis Enrique Santander
August 1, 2012
21:00

Lobos BUAP	2–2	Toluca
Tejeda 54'; Gutiérrez 86'	Report	Acosta 43'; Sinha 69'

Estadio Olímpico de C.U., Puebla
Referee: Carlos Manuel Martínez Soto

Lobos BUAP won the round 5–3 on aggregated score

July 25, 2012
19:00

Irapuato	3–2	Puebla
González 2', 90+1'; Jiménez 70'	Report	Chávez 35'; De Buen 46'

Estadio Sergio León Chávez, Irapuato
Referee: Uriel Olvera Ríos
August 1, 2012
21:00

Puebla	0–2	Irapuato
	Report	Rey 75'; Balcázar 90'

Estadio Cuauhtémoc, Puebla
Referee: Jorge Isaac Rojas Castillo

Irapuato won the round 5–2 on aggregated score

Round 2

August 7, 2012
21:00

Puebla	2–0	Lobos BUAP
Miranda 34'; Abelairas 47'	Report

Estadio Cuauhtémoc, Puebla
Referee: Miguel Ángel Flores Rodríguez
August 21, 2012

Lobos BUAP	0–2	Puebla
	Report	García 27'; B. Martinez 30'

Estadio Olímpico de C.U., Puebla

Puebla won the round 4–0 on aggregated score

August 8, 2012
19:00

Irapuato	0–1	Toluca
	Report	É. Benítez 43'; B. Martinez 30'

Estadio Sergio León Chávez, Irapuato
Referee: Erik Yair Miranda Galindo
August 22, 2012
19:00

Toluca	4–1	Irapuato
E. Brambila 43'; É. Benítez 45', 78', 81'	Report	Valadéz 54'

Estadio Nemesio Díez, Toluca
Attendance: 5,101
Referee: Antony Zanjuampa Rojo

Toluca won the round 5–1 on aggregated score

Round 3

August 29, 2012
19:00

Lobos BUAP	4–0	Irapuato
A. Lima 14', 70'; Gutiérrez 59', 76'	Report

Estadio Olímpico de C.U., Puebla
Attendance: 6,854
Referee: Marco Antonio Ortiz Nava
September 18, 2012
21:00

Irapuato	2–1	Lobos BUAP
J. Perea 53'; A. Ávalos 88'	Report	I. Íñiguez 43'

Estadio Sergio León Chávez, Irapuato
Attendance: 2,122
Referee: Oscar Bernardo Villagómez

Lobos BUAP won the round 5–2 on aggregated score

August 30, 2012
19:00

Puebla	1–0	Toluca
R. Ortiz 47'	Report

Estadio Cuauhtémoc, Puebla
Attendance: 4,164
Referee: Oscar Macías Romo
September 18, 2012
19:00

Toluca	2–0	Puebla
C. Esquivel 75'	Report	F. Pizano 49' (o.g.)

Estadio Nemesio Díez, Toluca
Attendance: 4,298
Referee: Fernando Guerrero Ramírez

Toluca won the round 2–1 on aggregated score

=== Ranking of runners-up clubs ===
The best runner-up advances to the Championship stage. If two or more teams are equal on points on completion of the group matches, the following criteria are applied to determine the rankings:

1. superior goal difference;
2. higher number of goals scored;
3. higher number of goals scored away;
4. best position in the Relegation table;
5. fair play ranking;
6. drawing of lots.

Grp	Team	Pld	W	D	L	RW	GF	GA	GD	Pts
4	San Luis	6	3	2	1	2	8	5	+3	13
5	América	6	3	0	3	3	17	9	+8	12
1	Morelia	6	2	3	1	3	14	6	+8	12
6	Mérida	6	3	1	2	2	8	4	+4	12
3	La Piedad	6	2	3	1	2	8	6	+2	11
2	Cruz Azul	6	2	2	2	2	6	4	+2	10
7	Puebla	6	3	0	3	1	7	7	0	10

== Championship stage ==
The eight clubs that advance to this stage will be ranked and seeded 1 to 8. In case of ties, the same tiebreakers used to rank the runners-up will be used.

In this stage, all the rounds will be one-off game. If the game ends in a tie, there will proceed to penalty shootouts directly. The venue will be determined as follows:

- If both clubs are from the same league, the highest seeded club will host the match.
- If both clubs are from different leagues, the club from Ascenso MX will host the match.

Seed	Team	Pld	W	D	L	RW	GF	GA	GD	Pts
1	Pachuca	6	4	1	1	3	9	2	+7	16
2	Necaxa	6	3	2	1	3	9	4	+5	14
3	San Luis	6	3	2	1	2	8	5	+3	13
4	Tijuana	6	3	2	1	2	8	6	+2	13
5	Correcaminos	6	3	2	1	2	12	13	−1	13
6	Dorados	6	4	0	2	1	10	13	−3	13
7	Toluca	6	3	1	2	2	10	7	+3	12
8	Neza	6	3	1	2	1	7	8	−1	11

Tiebreakers
Should the group winners be tied on points, the order of the teams will be determined in the following manner:
1. superior goal difference;
2. higher number of goals scored;
3. specific scores between tied clubs
4. higher number of goals scored away;
5. best position in the Relegation table;
6. fair play ranking;
7. drawing of lots.

=== Liguilla bracket ===
Quarter-finals
1	Pachuca	1(3)
8	Neza (pen.)	1(4)
4	Tijuana	5(6)
5	Correcaminos (pen.)	5(7)
2	Necaxa (pen.)	1(5)
7	Toluca	1(3)
3	San Luis	2
6	Dorados	3

Semi-finals
SF1	Neza	1(3)
SF4	Correcaminos (pen.)	1(4)
SF2	Necaxa	1
SF3	Dorados	2

Final
F1	Correcaminos	2(4)
F2	Dorados	2(5)

=== Quarter-finals ===
September 26, 2012
16:00

Neza	1–1	Pachuca
J. Rosas 65'	Report	R. Meráz 63'
Penalties
J. Rosas (penalty scored); L. Arroyo (penalty scored); J. Atilano (penalty scored); D. Mejía (penalty scored)	4–3	M. Cejas (penalty scored); Ó. Rojas (penalty scored); J. Hernández (penalty scored); N. Castillo (penalty missed); H. Herrera (penalty missed)

Estadio Neza 86, Ciudad Nezahualcóyotl
Attendance: 5,599
Referee: León Vicente Barajas Anzures

September 26, 2012
21:15

Correcaminos	5–5	Tijuana
L. Kontogiannis 41'; S. Rosas 66', 82'; N. Olivera 69'; R. Nurse 90+2'	Report	R. Nava 2', 42'; F. Martínez 29'; R. Enríquez 51'; A. Tahuilán 90+6'
Penalties
R. Nurse (penalty scored); E. Pacheco (penalty scored); S. Silva (penalty scored); L. Kontogiannis (penalty scored); N. Olivera (penalty missed); I. Vázquez (penalty scored); R. Espinoza (penalty scored); R. Jiménez (penalty scored)	7–6	J. Corona (penalty scored); J. Hernández (penalty scored); J. Gandolfi (penalty scored); F. Martínez (penalty missed); E. Vázquez (penalty scored); R. Ruiz (penalty scored); J. Abrego (penalty scored); A. Domínguez (penalty missed)

Estadio Marte R. Gómez, Ciudad Victoria
Attendance: 11,571
Referee: Erick Yair Miranda Galindo

September 26, 2012
19:00

Necaxa	1–1	Toluca
D. Santoya 80'	Report	E. Benítez 15'
Penalties
D. Santoya (penalty scored); L. Hernández (penalty scored); D. Cervantes (penalty scored); J. Mosqueda (penalty scored); M. Pérez (penalty scored)	5–3	E. Benítez (penalty missed); D. Novaretti (penalty scored); E. Brambila (penalty scored); G. Velasco (penalty scored)

Estadio Victoria, Aguascalientes
Attendance: 8,365
Referee: Carlos Manuel Martínez Soto

September 25, 2012
21:00

Dorados	3–2	San Luis
D. Mena 2'; J. Hernández 4', 15'	Report	D. Ordaz 50'; G. Rojas 56'

Estadio Carlos González, Culiacán
Attendance: 15,213
Referee: Baruch Absalón Castellanos

=== Semi-finals ===
October 24, 2012
19:00

Necaxa	1–2	Dorados
V. Lojero 79'	Report	G. Ramírez 75'; J. Hernández 83'

Estadio Victoria, Aguascalientes
Attendance: 10,063
Referee: Erick Yair Miranda

October 24, 2012
21:30

Correcaminos	1–1	Neza
R. Sena 60'	Report	J. Atilano 35'
Penalties
R. Nurse (penalty scored); E. Pacheco (penalty scored); R. Jiménez (penalty missed); R. Espinoza (penalty scored); N. Olivera (penalty missed); I. Vázquez (penalty scored)	4–3	I. Pineda (penalty missed); F. Doráme (penalty scored); R. Prieto (penalty missed); J. Reyes (penalty scored); D. Mejía (penalty scored); C. Guzmán (penalty missed)

Estadio Marte R. Gómez, Ciudad Victoria
Attendance: 12,114
Referee: Carlos M. Martínez Soto

=== Final ===
October 31, 2012
21:00

Correcaminos	2–2	Dorados
R. Espinoza 43'; R. Nurse 81'	Report	L. Ramírez 4'; A. Frausto 90'
Penalties
R. Nurse (penalty scored); J. Silva (penalty scored); R. Jiménez (penalty scored); R. Espinoza (penalty missed); F. Ayala (penalty scored)	4–5	C. Blanco (penalty scored); F. Ruíz (penalty scored); J. Güemez (penalty scored); E. Escudero (penalty scored); A. Frausto (penalty scored)

Estadio Marte R. Gómez, Ciudad Victoria
Referee: Baruch Absalón Castellanos

Copa MX
Apertura 2012
Winners

== Goalscorers ==
6 goals

- (Paraguay) Édgar Benítez (Toluca)
- (Mexico) Roberto Nurse (Correcaminos)

5 goals

- (Brazil) Aparecido Lima (Lobos BUAP)
- (Mexico) Martín Eduardo Zúñiga (América)

4 goals

- (England) (Mexico) Antonio Pedroza (Morelia)
- (Colombia) Daley Mena (Dorados)
- (Mexico) Emmanuel Tapia (Querétaro)
- (Mexico) Jahir Barraza (Atlas)
- (Mexico) Javier Orozco (Cruz Azul)
- (Ecuador) Jefferson Montero (Morelia)
- (Colombia) Danny Santoya (Necaxa)

3 goals

- (Mexico) Antonio López (América)
- (Mexico) Daniel Marquez (Necaxa)
- (Mexico) José Cruz Gutiérrez (Lobos BUAP)
- (Argentina) Juan Manuel Cavallo (La Piedad)
- (Mexico) Othoniel Arce (León)
- (Argentina) Pablo Torres (Veracruz)
- (Uruguay) Nicolas Olivera (Correcaminos)
- (Mexico) Raúl Nava López (Tijuana)
- (Mexico) Raúl Enríquez (Tijuana)

2 goals

- (Mexico) Alberto Medina (Pachuca)
- (Mexico) Alfonso Nieto (Pumas)
- (Mexico) Ángel Sepúlveda (Morelia)
- (Argentina) Ariel González (Irapuato)
- (Mexico) Carlos Alberto Campos (Pumas Morelos)
- (Mexico) Carlos Ochoa (Morelia)
- (Argentina) Daniel Montenegro (América)
- (Mexico) David Izazola (Pumas Morelos)
- (Uruguay) Diego Guastavino (Querétaro)
- (Mexico) Diego Mejía (Neza)
- (Mexico) Diego Ordaz (San Luis)
- (Mexico) Eduardo Herrera Aguirre (Pumas)
- (Ecuador) Félix Borja (Pachuca)
- (Ecuador) Fidel Martinez (Tijuana)
- (Paraguay) Gustavo Ramirez (Dorados)
- (Ecuador) Joao Rojas (Morelia)
- (Mexico) Jorge Mora (Correcaminos)
- (Mexico) Jose Maria Cardenas (América)
- (Mexico) Julio Cesar Pardini (Celaya)
- (Mexico) Luis Eduardo Rodríguez Chávez (Atlante)
- (Mexico) Marco Gómez (Mérida)
- (Uruguay) Matías Britos (León)
- (Mexico) Miguel Layún (América)
- (Mexico) Oscar Fernández (Altamira)
- (Argentina) Roberto Nicolás Saucedo (Correcaminos)
- (Colombia) Santiago Tréllez (San Luis)
- (Mexico) Sergio Rosas (Correcaminos)
- (United States) Sonny Guadarrama (Mérida)
- (Mexico) Alfredo González Tahuilán (Tijuana)

1 goal

- (Mexico) Abraham Avalos (Irapuato)
- (Mexico) Addiel Reyes (Mérida)
- (Mexico) Adolfo Domínguez (Tijuana)
- (Brazil) Adolfo Rosinei (América)
- (United States) Adrián Ruelas (Veracruz)
- (Mexico) Alfredo Frausto (Dorados)
- (Mexico) Antonio Salazar (Chiapas)
- (Mexico) Armando Pulido (Querétaro)
- (Mexico) Arturo Ortiz (León)
- (Mexico) Brayan Martinez (Puebla)
- (Mexico) Carlos Balcázar (Irapuato)
- (Mexico) Carlos Esquivel (Toluca)
- (Mexico) César Morales (Altamira)
- (Mexico) César Villaluz (San Luis)
- (Argentina) Christian Giménez (Cruz Azul)
- (Argentina) Christián Lillo (Altamira)
- (Mexico) Cuauhtémoc Blanco (Dorados)
- (Mexico) Daniel Cervantes (Necaxa)
- (Mexico) Dante Garay (Pumas Morelos)
- (Mexico) Diego De Buen (Puebla)
- (Mexico) Diego Jiménez (Mérida)
- (Uruguay) Diego Martiñones (Estudiantes Tecos)
- (Mexico) Eder Pacheco (Correcaminos)
- (Mexico) Edgar Ivan Pacheco (León)
- (Mexico) Eduardo Lillingston (Estudiantes Tecos)
- (Mexico) Edy German Brambila (Toluca)
- (Argentina) Emanuel Loeschbor (Neza)
- (Mexico) Emmanuel Cerda (San Luis)
- (Mexico) Emmanuel Sánchez Valdez (La Piedad)
- (Mexico) Erik Pimentel (América)
- (Costa Rica) Ever Alfaro (Mérida)
- (Mexico) Ever Guzman (Neza)
- (Mexico) Flavio Santos (Atlas)
- (Mexico) Fernando Sinecio González (La Piedad)
- (Mexico) Guillermo Rojas (San Luis)
- (Mexico) Héctor Acosta (Toluca)
- (Mexico) Héctor Miguel Gómez (Universidad de Guadalajara)
- (Mexico) Héctor Velázquez (Dorados)
- (Paraguay) Herminio Miranda (Puebla)
- (Mexico) Horacio Cervantes (Necaxa)
- (Spain) Ignacio del Moral (Altamira)
- (Mexico) Íñigo Rey (Irapuato)
- (Mexico) Ismael Íñiguez (Lobos BUAP)
- (Mexico) Ísrael Valadez (Irapuato)
- (Mexico) Iván Vázquez (Correcaminos)
- (Mexico) Jair Garcia (Puebla)
- (Mexico) Jesús Armando Sánchez (La Piedad)
- (Mexico) Jesús Isijara (Necaxa)
- (Mexico) Jesús Lara (Cruz Azul)
- (Mexico) Jesús Roberto Chávez (Puebla)
- (Mexico) Jorge García Carpizo (Querétaro)
- (Mexico) Jorge Zárate (Chiapas)
- (Mexico) José Antonio Rosas (Neza)
- (United States) José Francisco Torres (Pachuca)
- (Mexico) José Juan Vázquez (León)
- (Mexico) José Rodolfo Reyes (Neza)
- (Mexico) Josué Perea Aguilar (Irapuato)
- (Mexico) Jovanni Yazhin Hurtado Meza (Leones Negros)
- (Mexico) Juan Carlos Enriquez (Querétaro)
- (Mexico) Juan Carlos Medina (América)
- (Mexico) Juan Carlos Meza (Celaya)
- (Mexico) Juan Carlos Silva (San Luis)
- (Mexico) Juan Ignacio González (León)
- (Mexico) Juan José Calderón (León)
- (Mexico) Julio Atilano (Neza)
- (Mexico) Julio Gómez González (Pachuca)
- (Mexico) Lampros Kontogiannis (Correcaminos)
- (Mexico) Lorenzo Ramírez (Dorados)
- (Mexico) Luis Alberto Sánchez (Pachuca)
- (Mexico) Luis Ángel Landín (Querétaro)
- (Mexico) Luis Ángel Mendoza (San Luis)
- (Ecuador) Luis Bolanos (Atlas)
- (Mexico) Luis Fernando Sánchez (Altamira)
- (Spain) Luis Garcia Sanz (Pumas)
- (Mexico) Luis Nieves (León)
- (Mexico) Luis Orozco (Veracruz)
- (Mexico) Mariano Trujillo (Chiapas)
- (Argentina) Matías Abelairas (Puebla)
- (Mexico) Mauricio Romero Alvizu (Veracruz)
- (Mexico) Miguel Angel Herrera (Pachuca)
- (Mexico) Miguel Sansores (Neza)
- (Mexico) Nestor Diaz (Leones Negros)
- (Mexico) Omar Tejeda (Lobos BUAP)
- (Costa Rica) Óscar Emilio Rojas (La Piedad)
- (Paraguay) Pablo César Aguilar (Tijuana)
- (Mexico) Rafael Iván Ortiz (Puebla)
- (Mexico) Rafael Murguía (La Piedad)
- (Mexico) Raúl Meráz (Pachuca)
- (Mexico) Richard Ruíz (Tijuana)
- (Mexico) Rodolfo Espinoza (Correcaminos)
- (Argentina) Rodrigo Noya (Mérida)
- (Mexico) Rodrigo Prieto (Neza)
- (Mexico) Rolando Sena (Correcaminos)
- (Uruguay) Sebastián Fernández (San Luis)
- (Mexico) Sergio Javier Nápoles (Atlante)
- (Mexico) Sergio Santana (Atlas)
- (Mexico) Simón Steven Almeida Trinidad (Pachuca)
- (Mexico) Sinha (Toluca)
- (Mexico) Víctor Mañon (Pachuca)
- (Mexico) Victor Lojero (Necaxa)
- (Mexico) Victor Rosales (Pumas Morelos)
- (Argentina) Walter Jiménez (Irapuato)
- (Mexico) Yasser Corona (Chiapas)

Own goals

- (Mexico) Richard Ruíz (Tijuana) (For Celaya)
- (Mexico) Francisco Pizano (Puebla) (Toluca)

== Broadcast ==
Five television networks have the broadcasting rights. During the Group stage, the networks will broadcast either one or two groups:

- TVC Deportes: Groups 1 & 3.
- TDN: Groups 5 & 6.
- ESPN Deportes: Group 2.
- Fox Deportes: Group 4.
- SKY México: Group 7.

The broadcasting rights for the Championship Stage are shared between all the networks.
