= 2012 Ascenso MX Apertura Liguilla =

2012 Ascenso MX
Tournament details
- Country: Mexico
- Teams: 7

The Liguilla (English: Playoffs) of the Apertura 2012 season was a final knockout tournament involving the top seven teams of the Ascenso MX league. The winner qualified to the playoff match against the Clausura 2013 winner. If the winner of both tournaments was the same team, the team would have been promoted to the 2013–14 Liga MX season without playing the Promotional Final.

== Teams ==
The first team in the general table qualified for the semifinals. The six next best teams in the general table qualified to the quarterfinals.

S	Team	Manager	Captain	Performance at the 2012 Apertura							
S	Team	Manager	Captain	Pld	W	D	L	GF	GA	GD	Pts
1	Necaxa	(Mexico) Jaime Ordiales	(Mexico) Víctor Lojero	14	9	4	1	30	18	+12	31
2	Neza	(Argentina) Carlos Bustos	(Mexico) Diego Mejía	14	6	6	2	19	14	+5	24
3	Estudiantes Tecos	(Uruguay) Héctor Hugo Eugui	(Mexico) Diego Jiménez	14	6	5	3	16	12	+4	23
4	Lobos BUAP	(Mexico) Sergio Orduña	(Mexico) Alex Diego	14	7	2	5	20	17	+3	23
5	Mérida	(Argentina) Ricardo Valiño	(Mexico) Eder Patiño	14	6	5	3	14	12	+2	23
6	La Piedad	(Mexico) Cristóbal Ortega	(Mexico) Luis Antonio Martínez	14	6	4	4	21	16	+5	22
7	Dorados	(Mexico) Francisco Javier Ramírez	(Mexico) Cuauhtémoc Blanco	14	6	4	4	23	22	+1	22

== Bracket ==
The six best teams after the first place played two games against each other on a home-and-away basis. The winner of each match up was determined by aggregate score. If the teams were tied, the Away goals rule applied.

The teams were seeded one to seven in quarterfinals, and were re-seeded one to four in semifinals depending on their position in the general table. The higher seeded teams played on their home field during the second leg.

Quarterfinals
2	Neza	0	1	1
7	Dorados	1	2	3
3	Estudiantes Tecos	1	1	2
6	La Piedad	2	3	5
4	Lobos BUAP	0	4	4
5	Mérida	3	0	3

Semifinals
1	Necaxa	1	2	3
7	Dorados	1	2	3
6	La Piedad	1	2	3
4	Lobos BUAP	2	0	2

Finals
7	Dorados	1	1	2
6	La Piedad	0	(a.e.t.)3	3

- If the two teams were tied after both legs, the away goals rule applied. If both teams still tied, higher seeded team advanced.
- Teams were re-seeded every round.
- The winner qualified to the playoff match vs the Clausura 2013 winner. However, if the winner was the same in both tournaments, they would have been the team promoted to the 2012–13 Mexican Primera División season without playing the Promotional Final

== Quarterfinals ==
=== First leg ===
November 10, 2012
15:00

La Piedad	2 - 1	Estudiantes
R. Murguía 51'; J. Cavallo 57' (pen.)	Report	E. Lillingston 45' (pen.)

Estadio Juan N. López, La Piedad
Attendance: 3,958
Referee: León Vicente Barajas Anzures

November 10, 2012
19:00

Mérida	3 - 0	Lobos BUAP
G. España 12'; E. Alfaro 15'; D Jiménez 18'	Report

Estadio Carlos Iturralde, Mérida
Referee: Baruch Absalón Castellanos

November 11, 2012
19:00 MST/20:00 CST

Dorados	1 - 0	Neza
C. Blanco 32' (pen.)	Report

Estadio Carlos González, Culiacán
Referee: Roberto Ríos Jácome

=== Second leg ===
November 17, 2012
16:00

Lobos BUAP	4 - 0	Mérida
A. Lima 4'; D. Souza Gama 26', 87'; A. Sánchez 45'	Report

Estadio Olímpico de C.U., Puebla
Attendance: 9,551
Referee: Oscar Bernardo Villagómez

November 17, 2012
20:00

Estudiantes	1 - 3	La Piedad
D. Martiñones 16'	Report	J. Cavallo 54'; O. Rojas 74'; R. Murguía 93' (pen.)

Estadio Tres de Marzo, Zapopan
Attendance: 6,669
Referee: Erik Yair Miranda Galindo

November 18, 2012
12:00

Neza	1 - 2	Dorados
E. Guzmán 4'	Report	M. Osuna 14'; G. Rojas 67'

Estadio Neza 86, Ciudad Nezahualcóyotl
Attendance: >8,000
Referee: Carlos Manuel Martínez Soto

All game schedules are expressed in CST time, except where indicated.
Official schedules of Ascenso MX playoffs Quarter-finals

== Semifinals ==
=== First leg ===
November 21, 2012
20:30 MST/21:30 CST

Dorados	1 - 1	Necaxa
G. Rojas 4'	Report	D. Santoya 17'

Estadio Carlos González, Culiacán
Attendance: 16,924
Referee: Erick Yair Miranda Galindo

November 22, 2012
15:00

La Piedad	1 - 2	Lobos BUAP
J. Cavallo 12'	Report	H. Alférez 55'; D. Souza Gama 78'

Estadio Juan N. López, La Piedad
Attendance: 4,109
Referee: Roberto Ríos Jácome

=== Second leg ===
November 24, 2012
20:00

Necaxa	2 - 2	Dorados
M. García 51'; D. Santoya 72'; M. de la Cruz 75' (o.g.)	Report	G. Rojas 4'

Estadio Victoria, Aguascalientes
Attendance: 15,500
Referee: Oscar Bernardo Villagómez

Round tied 3-3. Dorados advance to Final by the away goal rule

November 25, 2012
16:10

Lobos BUAP	0 - 2	La Piedad
	Report	B. Godínez 29'; F. Sinecio 92'

Estadio Olímpico de C.U., Puebla
Attendance: 19,845
Referee: Carlos Manuel Martínez Soto

All game schedules are in CST time, except where indicated.

== Final ==
=== First leg ===
November 28, 2012
20:30 MST/21:30 CST

Dorados	1 - 0	La Piedad
L. Ramírez 61'	Report

Estadio Carlos González, Culiacán
Attendance: 21,163
Referee: Roberto Ríos Jácome

=== Second leg ===
December 1, 2012
15:00

La Piedad	3 - 1 (a.e.t.)	Dorados
E. García 2'; J. Cavallo 41'; L. Martínez García 90+3'	Report	G. Ramírez 50'

Estadio Juan N. López, La Piedad
Referee: Carlos Manuel Martínez Soto

Apertura 2012 winner:
La Piedad
2nd Title

=== Top goalscorers - Liguilla (Playoffs) ===
Last Updated on December 2, 2012.
Players sorted first by goals scored, then by goal frequency (Minutes played/Goals scored).

Rank	Player	Club	Goals	Goal freq.
1	(Paraguay) Gustavo A. Ramírez	Dorados	4	82.75
2	(Argentina) Juan Manuel Cavallo	La Piedad	4	113.00
3	(Colombia) Danny Santoya	Necaxa	2	84.00
4	(Brazil) C. E. de Souza	Lobos BUAP	2	154.50
5	(Mexico) Rafael Murguía	La Piedad	2	241.50
6	(Uruguay) Diego Martiñones	Tecos	1	90.00
7	(Costa Rica) Ever Alfaro	Mérida	1	101.00
8	(Mexico) Fernando Sinecio González	La Piedad	1	132.00
9	(Brazil) Aparecido Lima	Lobos BUAP	1	143.00
10	(Mexico) Gabriel España	Mérida	1	161.00
11	(Mexico) Ever Guzmán	Neza	1	163.00
12	(Mexico) Michel García	Necaxa	1	168.00
13	(Mexico) Diego Jiménez	Mérida	1	180.00
14	(Mexico) Eduardo Lillingston	Tecos	1	180.00
15	(Mexico) Hebert Alférez	Lobos BUAP	1	266.00

Source: Ascenso MX - Apertura 2012 Liguilla goalscorers official page
