= 2012–13 Ascenso MX season =

Season of a Mexican football league

Ascenso MX
- Season: 2012–13
- Champions: Apertura: La Piedad; Clausura: Neza
- Promoted: La Piedad
- Relegated: Pumas Morelos (dissolved after relegation)

The 2012–13 Ascenso MX season took place from 20 July 2012 to 11 May 2013 and was divided into two tournaments named Apertura 2012 and Clausura 2013. The Ascenso MX is the second-tier football league of Mexico.

The Apertura 2012 winner La Piedad defeated the Clausura 2013 winner Neza in a promotional final and won the ascension to the 2013–14 Liga MX season.

== Changes from the previous season ==
- León were promoted to Liga MX.
- Tecos were relegated from Liga MX.
- Titanes de Tulancingo, winners of Segunda División de México did not obtain a license to compete. The runners-up Tecamachalco also did not obtain a license. Since no teams were promoted from the Segunda, the total number of teams competing was reduced to fifteen.
- U. de G. avoided relegation due to the disaffiliation to Indios.

== Stadia and locations ==
The following 15 clubs competed in the Liga de Ascenso during the 2012–2013 season:

Location of teams in the 2012–13 Ascenso MX

| Club | City | Stadium | Capacity |
|---|---|---|---|
| Altamira | Altamira | Estadio Altamira | 9,581 |
| Celaya | Celaya | Estadio Miguel Alemán | 23,182 |
| Correcaminos | Ciudad Victoria | Estadio Marte R. Gómez | 10,520 |
| Cruz Azul Hidalgo | Jasso | Estadio 10 de Diciembre | 14,500 |
| Dorados de Sinaloa | Culiacán | Estadio Banorte | 17,898 |
| Tecos | Zapopan, Jalisco | Estadio Tres de Marzo | 18,779 |
| Irapuato | Irapuato | Estadio Sergio León Chávez | 25,000 |
| La Piedad | La Piedad | Estadio Juan N. López | 13,356 |
| Lobos BUAP | Puebla | Estadio Olímpico de C.U. | 19,283 |
| Mérida | Mérida | Estadio Carlos Iturralde | 15,087 |
| Necaxa | Aguascalientes | Estadio Victoria | 23,851 |
| Neza | Ciudad Nezahualcóyotl | Estadio Neza 86 | 20,000 |
| Pumas Morelos | Cuernavaca | Estadio Centenario | 14,800 |
| U. de G. | Guadalajara | Estadio Jalisco | 55,020 |
| Veracruz | Veracruz | Estadio Luis de la Fuente | 28,703 |

== Apertura 2012 ==
The 2012 Apertura was the first championship of the season. It began on 20 July 2012 and ended on 1 December 2012.

Ascenso MX
- Season: 2012–13
- Champions: La Piedad
- Matches: 117
- Goals: 294 (2.51 per match)
- Top goalscorer: Apertura: (Mexico) Víctor Lojero (11 goals) (Mexico) Rodrigo Prieto (11 goals)
- Biggest home win: Apertura: La Piedad 5-0 Dorados (4 November 2012)
- Biggest away win: Apertura: La Piedad 1-4 Necaxa (20 October 2012)
- Highest scoring: Apertura: Necaxa 6-4 Irapuato (17 August 2012)

=== Standings ===
| Pos | Team | Pld | W | D | L | GF | GA | GD | Pts | Qualification |
|---|---|---|---|---|---|---|---|---|---|---|
| 1 | Necaxa | 14 | 9 | 4 | 1 | 30 | 18 | +12 | 31 | Qualification for Liguilla semifinals |
| 2 | Neza | 14 | 6 | 6 | 2 | 19 | 14 | +5 | 24 | Qualification for Liguilla quarterfinals |
| 3 | Tecos | 14 | 6 | 5 | 3 | 16 | 12 | +4 | 23 | Qualification for Liguilla quarterfinals |
| 4 | Lobos BUAP | 14 | 7 | 2 | 5 | 20 | 17 | +3 | 23 | Qualification for Liguilla quarterfinals |
| 5 | Mérida | 14 | 6 | 5 | 3 | 14 | 12 | +2 | 23 | Qualification for Liguilla quarterfinals |
| 6 | La Piedad | 14 | 6 | 4 | 4 | 21 | 16 | +5 | 22 | Qualification for Liguilla quarterfinals |
| 7 | Dorados de Sinaloa | 14 | 6 | 4 | 4 | 23 | 22 | +1 | 22 | Qualification for Liguilla quarterfinals |
| 8 | Correcaminos | 14 | 5 | 3 | 6 | 19 | 16 | +3 | 18 | |
| 9 | Cruz Azul Hidalgo | 14 | 4 | 5 | 5 | 14 | 17 | −3 | 17 | |
| 10 | Celaya | 14 | 4 | 4 | 6 | 18 | 19 | −1 | 16 | |
| 11 | Irapuato | 14 | 3 | 7 | 4 | 16 | 19 | −3 | 16 | |
| 12 | Veracruz | 14 | 3 | 5 | 6 | 14 | 16 | −2 | 14 | |
| 13 | Altamira | 14 | 4 | 2 | 8 | 14 | 20 | −6 | 14 | |
| 14 | U. de G. | 14 | 3 | 3 | 8 | 14 | 23 | −9 | 12 | |
| 15 | Pumas Morelos | 14 | 1 | 5 | 8 | 8 | 19 | −11 | 8 | |

Updated to match(es) played on 4 November 2012. Source: .
Rules for classification: 1) points; 2) goal difference; 3) number of goals scored.

== Results ==
| Home \ Away | ALT | CEL | UAT | CAH | SIN | EST | IRA | LAP | UDG | BUP | MER | NEC | NEZ | PUM | VER |
|---|---|---|---|---|---|---|---|---|---|---|---|---|---|---|---|
| Altamira | | | | 0–1 | 0–1 | 1–2 | 2–1 | 2–3 | | | 0–2 | 2–0 | | | |
| Celaya | 0–1 | | 1–1 | 2–2 | | 3–0 | | 3–0 | 1–1 | | | | 1–2 | 2–1 | |
| Correcaminos | 3–1 | | | 3–0 | 2–1 | | | 1–1 | 3–1 | | | | 0–1 | 4–0 | |
| Cruz Azul Hidalgo | | | | | 1–2 | 0–0 | 3–0 | 1–3 | | 1–3 | 0–0 | 1–2 | | | |
| Dorados de Sinaloa | | 4–3 | | | | | 1–1 | | | 2–2 | 3–0 | 1–1 | | | 2–1 |
| Tecos | | | 0–0 | | 2–1 | | 0–0 | | 2–1 | | 2–0 | 1–2 | 0–0 | 2–0 | |
| Irapuato | | 0–1 | 1–0 | | | | | | | 2–0 | | | 1–1 | 2–2 | 1–1 |
| La Piedad | | | | | 5–0 | 1–1 | 0–1 | | | 1–0 | 1–1 | 1–4 | | | 2–0 |
| U. de G. | 0–2 | | | 0–1 | 0–2 | | 1–1 | 2–1 | | | 0–1 | 1–1 | | | |
| Lobos BUAP | 2–0 | 3–0 | 1–0 | | | 1–3 | | | 2–1 | | | | 1–3 | 2–0 | 2–1 |
| Mérida | | 3–1 | 3–1 | | | | 1–1 | | | 0–0 | | | 1–0 | | 1–0 |
| Necaxa | | 1–0 | 2–1 | | | | 6–4 | | | 3–1 | 3–1 | | | | 1–0 |
| Neza | 1–1 | | | 0–0 | 3–2 | | | 0–2 | 4–2 | | | 3–3 | | 1–0 | |
| Pumas Morelos | 2–0 | | | 1–2 | 1–1 | | | 0–0 | 0–1 | | 0–0 | 1–1 | | | |
| Veracruz | 2–2 | 0–0 | 3–0 | 1–1 | | 2–1 | | | 2–3 | | | | 0–0 | 1–0 | |

Legend: Blue = home team win; Yellow = draw; Red = away team win.
- Updated to 4 November 2012.

=== Apertura Liguilla (Playoffs) ===
The six best teams after the first place play two games against each other on a home-and-away basis. The winner of each match up is determined by aggregate score. If the teams were tied, the Away goals rule appliesd.

The teams were seeded one to seven in quarterfinals, and were re-seeded one to four in semifinals, depending on their position in the general table. The higher seeded teams played on their home field during the second leg.

Quarterfinals
2 | Neza | 0 | 1 | 1
7 | Dorados de Sinaloa | 1 | 2 | 3
3 | Tecos | 1 | 1 | 2
6 | La Piedad | 2 | 3 | 5
4 | Lobos BUAP | 0 | 4 | 4
5 | Mérida | 3 | 0 | 3

Semifinals
1 | Necaxa | 1 | 2 | 3
7 | Dorados de Sinaloa | 1 | 2 | 3
6 | La Piedad | 1 | 2 | 3
4 | Lobos BUAP | 2 | 0 | 2

Finals
7 | Dorados de Sinaloa | 1 | 1 | 2
6 | La Piedad | 0 | (a.e.t.)3 | 3

- If the two teams were tied after both legs, the away goals rule applied. If both teams were still tied, higher seeded team would have advanced.
- Teams were re-seeded every round.
- The winner qualified to the playoff match vs the Clausura 2013 winner. However, if the winner had been the same in both tournaments, they would have been promoted to the 2012–13 Mexican Primera División without playing the Promotional Final

Apertura 2012 winner

2nd title

== Top goalscorers - Apertura 2012 regular season ==
Last updated on 4 November 2012.
Players sorted first by goals scored, then by goal frequency (Minutes played/Goals scored).
In blue, the goal scoring champion(s) of Apertura 2012

| Rank | Player | Club | Goals | Goal freq. |
|---|---|---|---|---|
| 1 | (Mexico) Víctor Lojero | Necaxa | 11 | 91.36 |
| 2 | (Mexico) Rodrigo Prieto | Neza | 11 | 109.73 |
| 3 | (Colombia) Danny Santoya | Necaxa | 9 | 104.00 |
| 4 | (Argentina) Juan Manuel Cavallo | La Piedad | 9 | 126.56 |
| 5 | (Mexico) Roberto Nurse | Correcaminos | 8 | 141.25 |
| 6 | (Mexico) Eduardo Lillingston | Tecos | 8 | 146.88 |
| 7 | (Mexico) Julio Pardini | Celaya | 7 | 119.14 |
| 8 | (Mexico) Cuauhtémoc Blanco | Dorados de Sinaloa | 6 | 195.00 |
| 9 | (Brazil) Aparecido Lima | Lobos BUAP | 5 | 184.80 |
| 10 | (Argentina) Ariel González | Irapuato | 5 | 208.60 |
| 11 | (Mexico) Omar Tejeda | Lobos BUAP | 5 | 209.60 |
| 12 | (United States) Sonny Guadarrama | Mérida | 4 | 148.25 |
| 13 | (Mexico) Diego Campos | U. de G. | 4 | 200.00 |
| 14 | (Mexico) Ismael Valadéz | Cruz Azul Hidalgo | 4 | 225.75 |
| 15 | (Mexico) Juan de Dios Hernández | Dorados de Sinaloa | 4 | 241.00 |

Source: Ascenso MX goalscorers official page

== Clausura 2013 ==
The 2013 Clausura was the second championship of the season. It began on 4 January 2013 and ended on 11 May 2013.

Ascenso MX
- Season: 2012–13
- Champions: Neza
- Top goalscorer: Clausura: (Mexico) Víctor Lojero (12 goals)
- Biggest home win: Clausura: U. de G. 3-0 Pumas Morelos (6 January 2013) Pumas Morelos 3-0 Irapuato (12 January 2013) Lobos BUAP 3-0 Dorados de Sinaloa (18 January 2013)
- Biggest away win: Clausura: Altamira 1-3 Neza (5 January 2013)
- Highest scoring: Clausura: Cruz Azul Hidalgo 3-4 Celaya (20 January 2013)

=== Standings ===
| Pos | Team | Pld | W | D | L | GF | GA | GD | Pts | Qualification or relegation |
|---|---|---|---|---|---|---|---|---|---|---|
| 1 | U. de G. | 14 | 9 | 3 | 2 | 15 | 7 | +8 | 30 | Qualification for Liguilla semifinals |
| 2 | Correcaminos | 14 | 8 | 2 | 4 | 17 | 10 | +7 | 26 | Qualification for Liguilla quarterfinals |
| 3 | Lobos BUAP | 14 | 8 | 1 | 5 | 16 | 10 | +6 | 25 | Qualification for Liguilla quarterfinals |
| 4 | Veracruz | 14 | 7 | 4 | 3 | 23 | 18 | +5 | 25 | Qualification for Liguilla quarterfinals |
| 5 | Necaxa | 14 | 5 | 6 | 3 | 23 | 15 | +8 | 21 | Qualification for Liguilla quarterfinals |
| 6 | Neza | 14 | 6 | 2 | 6 | 19 | 14 | +5 | 20 | Qualification for Liguilla quarterfinals |
| 7 | Celaya | 14 | 4 | 8 | 2 | 17 | 16 | +1 | 20 | Qualification for Liguilla quarterfinals |
| 8 | Tecos | 14 | 5 | 4 | 5 | 11 | 10 | +1 | 19 | |
| 9 | Dorados de Sinaloa | 14 | 5 | 4 | 5 | 11 | 14 | −3 | 19 | |
| 10 | Altamira | 14 | 4 | 6 | 4 | 18 | 18 | 0 | 18 | |
| 11 | Pumas Morelos | 14 | 4 | 5 | 5 | 13 | 15 | −2 | 17 | Relegation to Segunda División de México |
| 12 | Mérida | 14 | 2 | 7 | 5 | 13 | 18 | −5 | 13 | |
| 13 | La Piedad | 14 | 3 | 3 | 8 | 13 | 17 | −4 | 12 | |
| 14 | Cruz Azul Hidalgo | 14 | 3 | 3 | 8 | 13 | 26 | −13 | 12 | |
| 15 | Irapuato | 14 | 1 | 4 | 9 | 7 | 21 | −14 | 7 | |

Updated to match(es) played on 21 April 2013. Source: Official Standings from official ascenso MX site.(Liga MX)
Rules for classification: 1) points; 2) goal difference; 3) number of goals scored.

== Results ==
| Home \ Away | ALT | CEL | UAT | CAH | SIN | EST | IRA | LAP | UDG | BUP | MER | NEC | NEZ | PUM | VER |
|---|---|---|---|---|---|---|---|---|---|---|---|---|---|---|---|
| Altamira | | 1–1 | 0–1 | | | | | | 1–1 | 0–2 | | | 1–3 | 1–0 | 3–0 |
| Celaya | | | | | 2–2 | | 0–0 | | | 1–0 | 1–1 | 1–1 | | | 2–2 |
| Correcaminos | | 0–1 | | | | 0–1 | | | | 1–0 | 3–1 | 3–3 | | | 1–0 |
| Cruz Azul Hidalgo | 2–2 | 3–4 | 0–1 | | | | | | 0–1 | | | | 1–5 | 1–1 | 0–0 |
| Dorados | 2–3 | | 1–0 | 1–0 | | 2–1 | | 1–0 | 0–0 | | | | 1–0 | 0–1 | |
| Estudiantes | 2–0 | 1–2 | | 1–0 | | | | 2–1 | | 1–0 | | | | | 0–1 |
| Irapuato | 0–2 | | | | 0–0 | 1–0 | | 3–3 | 0–1 | | 0–1 | 1–1 | | | |
| La Piedad | 0–0 | 3–1 | 1–2 | 0–1 | | | | | 1–2 | | | | 1–0 | 0–0 | |
| Leones Negros | | 1–0 | 1–0 | | | 0–0 | | | | 1–2 | | | 1–0 | 3–0 | 0–2 |
| Lobos BUAP | | | | 1–0 | 3–0 | | 1–0 | 2–1 | | | 2–0 | 1–0 | | | |
| Mérida | 1–1 | | | | | | | | 0–1 | | | | | | |
| Necaxa | 3–3 | | | | | | | | | | | | | | |
| Neza | | | | | | | | | | | | | | | |
| Pumas Morelos | | | | | | 1–1 | 3–0 | | | | | | | | |
| Veracruz | | | | | 2–0 | | | 1–0 | | | | | | | |

Legend: Blue = home team win; Yellow = draw; Red = away team win.
- Updated to 22 January 2013.

=== Clausura Liguilla (Playoffs) ===
The eight qualified teams played two games against each other on a home-and-away basis. The winner of each match was determined by aggregate score.

The teams were seeded one to eight in the quarterfinals, and were re-seeded one to four in the semifinals, depending on their position in the general table. The higher seeded teams played on their home field during the second leg.

Quarterfinals
3 | Lobos BUAP | 1 | 0 | 1
6 | Neza | 2 | 1 | 3
2 | UAT | 1 | 3 | 4
7 | Celaya | 1 | 0 | 1
4 | Veracruz | 2 | 1 | 3
5 | Necaxa | 3 | 3 | 6

Semifinals
1 | U. de G. | 1 | 0 | 1
4 | Neza | 2 | 2 | 4
2 | UAT | 1 | 3 | 4
3 | Necaxa | 3 | 3 | 6

Finals
2 | Neza | 3 | 1 | 4
1 | Necaxa | 0 | 0 | 0

- If the two teams were tied after both legs, the higher seeded team advanced.
- Teams were re-seeded every round.
- The winner qualified to the playoff match vs the Apertura 2012 winner. However, if the winner had been the same in both tournaments, they would have been promoted to the 2013–14 Mexican Primera División season without playing the Promotional Final.

==== Quarterfinals ====
| Team 1 | Agg. | Team 2 | 1st leg | 2nd leg |
|---|---|---|---|---|
| Lobos BUAP | 1–3 | Neza | 1–2 | 0–1 |
| UAT | 4–1 | Celaya | 1–1 | 3–0 |
| Veracruz | 3–6 | Necaxa | 2–3 | 1–3 |

===== First leg =====
| 24 April 2013 | Neza | 2–1 | Lobos BUAP | Ciudad Nezahualcóyotl |
| 16:00 | A. Sepúlveda 23'; R. Vilchis 83' | | I. Íñiguez 25' | Stadium: Estadio Neza 86; Attendance: 6,750; Referee: Eduardo Galván Basurto |

| 24 April 2013 | Celaya | 1–1 | UAT | Celaya |
| 19:00 | J. Ocampo 34' | Report | E. Dos Santos 6' | Stadium: Estadio Miguel Alemán Valdés; Attendance: 13,400; Referee: Quetzalli Alvarado Godínez |

| 24 April 2013 | Necaxa | 3–2 | Veracruz | Aguascalientes |
| 21:00 | A. Escoboza 14', 50'; C. Hurtado 61' | Report | B. Luna 31'; A. Castillo 58' | Stadium: Estadio Victoria; Attendance: 8,320; Referee: León Vicente Barajas Anzures |

===== Second leg =====
| 27 April 2013 | Veracruz | 1–3 (3–6 agg.) | Necaxa | Veracruz |
| 16:30 | P. Torres 67' | Report | V. Lojero 40'; D. Santoya 57'; M. García 77' | Stadium: Estadio Luis "Pirata" Fuente; Attendance: 20,000; Referee: Erick Yaír Miranda Galindo |

| 27 April 2013 | Lobos BUAP | 0–1 (1–3 agg.) | Neza | Puebla |
| 18:30 | | Report | E. Guzmán 26' | Stadium: Estadio Universitario BUAP; Attendance: 10,817; Referee: Roberto Ríos Jácome |

| 27 April 2013 | UAT | 3–0 (3–1 agg.) | Celaya | Ciudad Victoria |
| 20:30 | E. Pacheco 4'; R. Nurse 30', 36' | Report | | Stadium: Estadio Marte R. Gómez; Attendance: 15,161; Referee: Ángel Monroy Bello |

==== Semifinals ====
| Team 1 | Agg. | Team 2 | 1st leg | 2nd leg |
|---|---|---|---|---|
| U. de G. | 1–4 | Neza | 1–2 | 0–2 |
| UAT | 4–6 | Necaxa | 1–3 | 3–3 |

===== First leg =====
| 1 May 2013 | Necaxa | 3–1 | UAT | Aguascalientes |
| 21:00 | A. Escoboza 22'; V. Lojero 49'; L. Padilla 87' | Report | R. Nurse 58' | Stadium: Estadio Victoria; Attendance: 15,362; Referee: León Vicente Barajas Anzures |

| 2 May 2013 | Neza | 2–1 | U. de G. | Ciudad Nezahualcóyotl |
| 16:00 | R. Prieto 19'; E. Guzmán 37' | Report | E. González 5' | Stadium: Estadio Neza 86; Attendance: 10,560; Referee: Ángel Monroy Bello |

===== Second leg =====
| 4 May 2013 | UAT | 3–3 (4–6 agg.) | Necaxa | Ciudad Victoria |
| 20:30 | E. Pacheco 80', 90+5'; J. Silva 84' | Report | V. Lojero 14'; D. Cervantes 71'; R. de Pinho 90' | Stadium: Estadio Marte R. Gómez; Attendance: 17,250; Referee: Roberto Ríos Jácome |

| 5 May 2013 | U. de G. | 0–2 (1–4 agg.) | Neza | Guadalajara |
| 19:00 | | Report | R. Vilchis 65'; R. Prieto 77' | Stadium: Estadio Jalisco; Attendance: 31,864; Referee: Erick Yaír Miranda Galindo |

==== Final ====
| Team 1 | Agg. | Team 2 | 1st leg | 2nd leg |
|---|---|---|---|---|
| Necaxa | 0–4 | Neza | 0–3 | 0–1 |

===== First leg =====
| 8 May 2013 | Neza | 3–0 | Necaxa | Ciudad Nezahualcóyotl |
| 16:30 | R. Vilchis 6'; D. Mejía 13'; A. Sepúlveda 46' | Report | | Stadium: Estadio Neza 86; Attendance: 13,795; Referee: Erick Yaír Miranda Galindo |

===== Second leg =====
| 11 May 2013 | Necaxa | 0–1 (0–4 agg.) | Neza | Aguascalientes |
| 21:00 | | Report | A. Lucio 90' | Stadium: Estadio Victoria; Attendance: 23,778; Referee: Roberto Ríos Jácome |

Clausura 2013 winner

1st title

== Campeón de Ascenso 2013 ==
=== First leg ===
15 May 2013

| La Piedad | 0–1 | Neza |
|---|---|---|
| | | Ever Guzmán 32' |

Estadio Juan N. López, La Piedad
Referee: Roberto Ríos

=== Second leg ===
18 May 2013
15:00

| Neza | 0–1 | La Piedad |
|---|---|---|
| | | Luis Antonio Martínez 25' |
Penalties
| José Antonio Rosas (penalty scored); Ever Guzmán (penalty missed); Angel Sepúlveda (penalty scored); Emanuel Sebastián Loeschbor (penalty scored) | 3–5 | (penalty scored) Oscar Emilio Rojas; (penalty scored) Hugo Cid; (penalty scored) Fernando Santana; (penalty scored) Emanuel García; (penalty scored) Luis Antonio Martínez |

Estadio Neza 86, Ciudad Nezahualcóyotl
Attendance: 12550
Referee: Erick Yair Miranda Galindo

Champions

2nd title

== Top goalscorers - Clausura 2013 regular season ==
Last Updated on 21 January 2012.
Players sorted first by goals scored, then by goal frequency (Minutes played/Goals scored).

| Rank | Player | Club | Goals | Goal freq. |
|---|---|---|---|---|
| 1 | (Mexico) Víctor Lojero | Necaxa | 12 | 101.00 |
| 2 | (Argentina) Pablo Torres | Veracruz | 11 | 111.64 |
| 3 | (Argentina) Eial Strahman | U. de G. | 9 | 102.78 |
| 4 | (Colombia) Danny Santoya | Necaxa | 7 | 139.14 |
| 5 | (Mexico) Diego Mejía | Neza | 6 | 185.50 |
| 6 | (Uruguay) Diego Martiñones | Tecos | 5 | 184.80 |
| 7 | (Mexico) Oscar Fernández | Altamira | 5 | 190.40 |
| 8 | (United States) Sonny Guadarrama | Mérida | 5 | 234.60 |
| 9 | (Mexico) Jorge Ocampo | Celaya | 5 | 244.00 |
| 10 | (Mexico) Hebert Alférez | Lobos BUAP | 4 | 119.25 |

Source: Ascenso MX goalscorers official page - Clausura 2013

== Relegation table ==
The relegated team had the lowest ratio by adding the points scored in the following tournaments: Apertura 2010, Bicentenario 2011, Apertura 2011 and Clausura 2012 and Apertura 2012 and Clausura 2013.

| Rank | Team | Points | Games | % |
|---|---|---|---|---|
| 9 | Dorados de Sinaloa | 105 | 84 | 1.2500 |
| 10 | Mérida | 103 | 84 | 1.2262 |
| 11 | Celaya | 62 | 52 | 1.1923 |
| 12 | Altamira | 100 | 84 | 1.1905 |
| 13 | U. de G. | 101 | 85 | 1.1882 |
| 14 | Cruz Azul Hidalgo | 93 | 84 | 1.1071 |
| 15 | Pumas Morelos | 92 | 85 | 1.0824 |

Source: Ascenso MX relegation table - Clausura 2013
