= 2011 Liga de Ascenso Apertura Liguilla =

2011 Liga de Ascenso
Tournament details
- Country: Mexico
- Teams: 7

Final positions
- Champions: Correcaminos (2nd title)
- Runner-up: La Piedad

Tournament statistics
- Matches played: 12
- Goals scored: 34 (2.83 per match)
- Top goal scorer(s): (Brazil) Eder Pacheco (4)

The Liguilla (English: Little League) of the 2011–12 Liga de Ascenso season is a final knockout tournament involving seven teams of the Liga de Ascenso. The winner will qualify to the playoff match vs the Clausura 2011 winner. However, if the winner of both tournaments is the same team, the team would be promoted to the 2012–13 Mexican Primera División season without playing the Promotional Final.

== Teams ==
The first team in the general table qualified for the semi-finals. The six next best teams in the general table qualified to the quarter-finals.

S	Team	Manager	Captain	Performance at the 2011 Apertura							
S	Team	Manager	Captain	Pld	W	D	L	GF	GA	GD	Pts
1	La Piedad	(Mexico) Cristóbal Ortega	(Mexico) Jorge Campos	15	10	1	4	26	17	+9	31
2	Correcaminos	(Mexico) Ignacio Rodríguez	(Argentina) Diego Olsina	15	7	6	2	33	21	+12	27
3	Neza	(Mexico) David Patiño	(Mexico) Carlos Cariño	15	7	5	3	27	22	+5	26
4	León	(Mexico) Pedro Muñoz	(Mexico) Alejandro Corona	15	5	8	2	26	16	+10	23
5	Irapuato	(Mexico) Omar Arellano	(Mexico) Cuauhtémoc Blanco	15	7	2	6	24	17	+7	23
6	Necaxa	(Mexico) Luis Francisco García	(Argentina) Pablo Quatrocchi	15	6	5	4	15	14	+1	23
7	Altamira	(Mexico) Mario Alberto García	(Mexico) Eduardo García	15	6	4	5	22	22	0	22

== Bracket ==
The six best teams after the first place play two games against each other on a home-and-away basis. The winner of each match up is determined by aggregate score.

The teams were seeded one to seven in quarterfinals, and will be re-seeded one to four in semifinals, depending on their position in the general table. The higher seeded teams play on their home field during the second leg.

Quarterfinals
4	León	1	2	3
5	Irapuato	0	0	0
2	Correcaminos	1	1	2
7	Altamira	2	0	2
3	Neza	1	2	3
6	Necaxa	0	2	2

Semifinals
1	La Piedad	5	1	6
4	León	3	2	5
2	Correcaminos	1	2	3
3	Neza	2	1	3

Finals
1	La Piedad	1	0	1
2	Correcaminos	3	1	4

- If the two teams are tied after both legs, the higher seeded team advances.
- Teams are re-seeded every round.
- The winner will qualify to the playoff match vs the Clausura 2011 winner. However, if the winner is the same in both tournaments, they would be the team promoted to the 2012–13 Mexican Primera División season without playing the Promotional Final

== Quarter-finals ==
Team 1	Agg.	Team 2	1st leg	2nd leg
Correcaminos (2)	2 – 2	(7) Altamira	1 – 2	1 – 0
Neza (3)	3 – 2	(6) Necaxa	1 – 0	2 – 2
León (4)	3 – 0	(5) Irapuato	1 – 0	2 – 0

Kickoffs are given in local time (UTC-6 unless stated otherwise).

=== First leg ===
November 23, 2011	Irapuato	0 – 1	León	Irapuato, Guanajuato
20:45		Report	69' Pacheco	Stadium: Estadio Sergio León Chavez; Referee: Gerardo García Acevedo

November 24, 2011	Altamira	2 – 1	Correcaminos	Altamira, Tamaulipas
18:00	Rojas 62'; Vázquez 80'; Collazo (yellow card) 84' (yellow-red card) 89'	Report	24' Torres	Stadium: Estadio Altamira; Referee: Víctor Bisguerra Mendiola

November 24, 2011	Necaxa	0 – 1	Neza	Aguascalientes, Aguascalientes
20:00		Report	42' Luciano Emílio; (red card) 60' Mejía	Stadium: Estadio Victoria; Referee: Eduardo Galván Basulto

=== Second leg ===
November 26, 2011	León	2 – 0	Irapuato	León, Guanajuato
21:00	Pacheco 7', 13'	Report	(red card) 60' Hernández	Stadium: Estadio Nou Camp; Referee: Obed Eliud Gómez

León advanced 3 – 0 on aggregate

November 27, 2011	Neza	2 – 2	Necaxa	Ciudad Nezahualcóyotl, Mexico State
12:00	Prieto 29'; Luciano Emílio 78'	Report	5' Isijara; 42' Lojero; (yellow card) 85' (yellow-red card) 90+4' Castillo	Stadium: Estadio Neza 86; Referee: Baruch Absalón Castellanos

Neza advanced 3 – 2 on aggregate

November 27, 2011	Correcaminos	1 – 0	Altamira	Ciudad Victoria, Tamaulipas
18:00	Menghi 88'	Report	(yellow card) 37' (yellow-red card) 84' Cuevas	Stadium: Estadio Marte R. Gomez; Referee: Ángel Monroy Bello

Correcaminos advanced because of their better position on the league table

== Semi-finals ==
Team 1	Agg.	Team 2	1st leg	2nd leg
La Piedad (1)	6 – 5	(4) León	5 – 3	1 – 2
Correcaminos (2)	3 – 3	(3) Neza	1 – 2	2 – 1

Kickoffs are given in local time (UTC-6 unless stated otherwise).

=== First leg ===
December 1, 2011	Neza	2 – 1	Correcaminos	Ciudad Nezahualcóyotl, Mexico State
15:30	Prieto 75', 88'; Rojas (yellow card) 45' (yellow-red card) 57'	Report	87' Menghi	Stadium: Estadio Neza 86; Referee: Obed Eliud Gómez

December 1, 2011	León	3 – 5	La Piedad	León, Guanajuato
21:00	Torres 58'; Maz 81', 82'	Report	29' Nurse; 41', 47' Padilla; 87', 90' Mendoza	Stadium: Estadio Nou Camp; Referee: León Vicente Barajas

=== Second leg ===
December 4, 2011	La Piedad	1 – 2	León	La Piedad, Michoacán
12:00	J. Sánchez 81'	Report	32' Pacheco; 44' Peña; (yellow card) 15' (yellow-red card) 79' González	Stadium: Estadio Juan N. López; Referee: Baruch Absalón Castellanos

December 4, 2011	Correcaminos	2 – 1	Neza	Ciudad Victoria, Tamaulipas
18:00	Saucedo 66'; Sánchez 70'	Report	38' Luciano Emílio	Stadium: Estadio Marte R. Gomez; Referee: Víctor Bisguerra Mendiola

== Final ==
Team 1	Agg.	Team 2	1st leg	2nd leg
La Piedad (1)	1 – 4	(2) Correcaminos	1 – 3	0 – 1

Kickoffs are given in local time (UTC-6 unless stated otherwise).

=== First leg ===
December 7, 2011	Correcaminos	3 – 1	La Piedad	Ciudad Victoria, Tamaulipas
20:30	Olsina 52'; González 76', 86'	Report	38' Nurse	Stadium: Estadio Marte R. Gomez; Referee: Baruch Absalón Castellanos

=== Second leg ===
December 10, 2011	La Piedad	0 – 1	Correcaminos	La Piedad, Michoacán
15:00		Report	84' Domínguez	Stadium: Estadio Juan N. López; Referee: Víctor Bisguerra Mendiola

Apertura 2011 winners:
Correcaminos
2nd Title

== Goalscorers ==
4 goals

- (Brazil) Eder Pacheco (León)

3 goals

- (Brazil) Luciano Emílio (Neza)
- (Mexico) Rodrigo Prieto (Neza)

2 goals

- (Argentina) Diego Menghi (Correcaminos)
- (Mexico) Antonio González Arias (Correcaminos)
- (United States) Jesús Padilla (La Piedad)
- (Mexico) Luis Ángel Mendoza (La Piedad)
- (Mexico) Roberto Nurse (La Piedad)
- (Uruguay) Nelson Sebastián Maz (León)

1 goal

- (Paraguay) Cristian Rojas (Altamira)
- (Mexico) Eliazar Vázquez (Altamira)
- (Argentina) Roberto Nicolás Saucedo (Correcaminos)
- (Mexico) Raymundo Torres (Correcaminos)
- (Mexico) Hugo Sánchez (Correcaminos)
- (Argentina) Diego Olsina (Correcaminos)
- (Mexico) Tomás Domínguez (Correcaminos)
- (Mexico) Jesús Armando Sánchez (La Piedad)
- (Mexico) Gregorio Torres (León)
- (Mexico) Carlos Alberto Peña (León)
- (Mexico) Jesús Isijara (Necaxa)
- (Mexico) Víctor Lojero (Necaxa)
