= 2006–07 Primera División A season =

Season of a Mexican football league

Primera División A
- Season: 2006–07
- Champions: Apertura: Puebla (2nd Title); Clausura: Dorados de Sinaloa (2nd title)
- Promoted: Puebla
- Relegated: Monarcas Morelia A
- Top goalscorer: Apertura: Álvaro Fabián González (14); Clausura: Álvaro Fabián González (16)

Primera División A (Méxican First A Division) is a Mexican football tournament. This season was composed of Apertura 2006 and Clausura 2007. Puebla was the winner of the promotion to First Division after winning Dorados de Sinaloa in the promotion playoff.

== Changes for the 2006–07 season ==
- Dorados de Sinaloa was relegated from Primera División.
- The Mexican Football Federation forced that each of the 18 teams participating in the Primera División had a reserve team in Primera 'A'. For this reason, new expansion franchises were created: Pumas Morelos, Tecos 'A', Monarcas Morelia 'A', Santos Laguna 'A' and Gallos de Caliente. Some teams maintained their own identity, but signed partnership agreements with Primera División clubs.
- Coyotes de Sonora was moved to Zapotlanejo and was renamed as Académicos de Atlas.
- Chivas Coras was moved to Guadalajara and was renamed as C.D. Tapatío.
- Lagartos de Tabasco was moved to Coatzacoalcos, where it was renamed Tiburones Rojos, being a reserve team of Veracruz.
- Pegaso Anáhuac was promoted from Second Division. However, the team was moved to Colima and was renamed as Pegaso Real Colima.
- Guerreros de Tabasco, new expansion team.
- Before Clausura 2007, Gallos de Caliente was renamed Club Celaya and was relocated to the homonymous city. Instead, businessmen in Tijuana bought the franchise belonging to Guerreros de Tabasco, moved it to the city and called it Club Tijuana.
- Before Clausura 2007, Zacatepec was moved to Mexico City and was renamed as Socio Águila F.C.

== Stadiums and locations ==
Club	Stadium	Capacity	City	Affiliate
Académicos	Miguel Hidalgo	3,000	Zapotlanejo, Jalisco	Atlas F.C.
Atlético Mexiquense	Ixtapan 90	4,000	Ixtapan de la Sal, State of Mexico	Toluca
Correcaminos UAT	Marte R. Gómez	20,000	Ciudad Victoria, Tamaulipas	None
Cruz Azul Hidalgo	10 de Diciembre	17,000	Ciudad Cooperativa Cruz Azul, Hidalgo	Cruz Azul
Dorados de Sinaloa	Banorte	19,000	Culiacán, Sinaloa	Necaxa
Durango	Francisco Zarco	15,000	Durango, Durango	None
Gallos de Caliente	Unidad Deportiva CREA	10,000	Tijuana, Baja California	Querétaro
Guerreros de Tabasco	Olímpico de Villahermosa	12,000	Villahermosa, Tabasco	None
Indios	Olímpico Benito Juárez	22,000	Ciudad Juárez, Chihuahua	Pachuca
León	Nou Camp	35,000	León, Guanajuato	None
Lobos BUAP	Cuauhtémoc	42,600	Puebla, Puebla	None
Monarcas Morelia 'A'	Morelos	39,000	Morelia, Michoacán	Monarcas Morelia
Pegaso Real Colima	Colima	17,000	Colima, Colima	Atlante
Puebla	Cuauhtémoc	42,600	Puebla, Puebla	None
Pumas Morelos	Centenario	14,800	Cuernavaca, Morelos	Pumas UNAM
Rayados 'A'	El Barrial / Tecnológico	1,000 / 36,000	Monterrey, Nuevo León	Monterrey
Salamanca	Olímpico Sección 24	10,000	Salamanca, Guanajuato	Jaguares de Chiapas
Santos Laguna 'A'	Corona	19,000	Torreón, Coahuila	Santos Laguna
Tampico Madero	Tamaulipas	30,000	Tampico - Madero, Tamaulipas	San Luis
Tapatío	Anacleto Macías "Tolán"	4,000	Guadalajara, Jalisco	Guadalajara
Tecos 'A'	Tres de Marzo	25,000	Zapopan, Jalisco	Tecos UAG
Tiburones Rojos de Coatzacoalcos	Rafael Hernández Ochoa	4,800	Coatzacoalcos, Veracruz	Veracruz
Tigres Mochis	Centenario LM	7,000	Los Mochis, Sinaloa	Tigres UANL
Zacatepec	Agustín Coruco Díaz	18,000	Zacatepec, Morelos	América

=== Clausura 2007 new teams ===
Club	Stadium	Capacity	City	Affiliate
Club Celaya	Miguel Alemán	24,000	Celaya, Guanajuato	Querétaro
Socio Águila	Estadio Azteca	114,600	Mexico City	América
Tijuana	Unidad Deportiva CREA	10,000	Tijuana, Baja California	None

Location of teams in the 2006-2007 Primera División A

== Apertura 2006 ==
=== Group league tables ===
==== Group 1 ====
Pos	Team	Pld	W	D	L	GF	GA	GD	Pts
1	Salamanca	17	9	6	2	32	17	+15	33
2	Gallos de Caliente	17	9	4	4	21	16	+5	31
3	Durango	17	6	9	2	17	14	+3	27
4	León	17	8	1	8	26	30	−4	25
5	Pegaso Real Colima	17	6	5	6	20	15	+5	23
6	Santos Laguna 'A'	17	6	5	6	25	26	−1	23
7	Tecos 'A'	17	5	5	7	24	24	0	20
8	Académicos	17	5	5	7	21	23	−2	20
9	Tapatío	17	5	5	7	22	31	−9	20
10	Dorados de Sinaloa	17	4	7	6	17	21	−4	19
11	Tigres Mochis	17	4	4	9	12	22	−10	16
12	Monarcas Morelia 'A'	17	2	2	13	12	34	−22	8

Source: Ascenso MX and Soccerway
Rules for classification: 1st points; 2nd goal difference; 3rd goals scored; 4th head-to-head; 5th away goals scored; 6th draw

==== Group 2 ====
Pos	Team	Pld	W	D	L	GF	GA	GD	Pts
1	Puebla	17	9	6	2	30	17	+13	33
2	Cruz Azul Hidalgo	17	9	6	2	23	15	+8	33
3	Indios	17	9	2	6	30	21	+9	29
4	TR Coatzacoalcos	17	7	5	5	27	22	+5	26
5	Lobos BUAP	17	7	4	6	27	26	+1	25
6	Correcaminos UAT	17	7	4	6	24	26	−2	25
7	Pumas Morelos	17	7	2	8	25	22	+3	23
8	Zacatepec	17	7	1	9	21	22	−1	22
9	Rayados 'A'	17	6	3	8	24	27	−3	21
10	Tampico Madero	17	5	5	7	20	20	0	20
11	Guerreros de Tabasco	17	5	5	7	24	27	−3	20
12	Atlético Mexiquense	17	3	8	6	20	24	−4	17

Source: Ascenso MX and Soccerway
Rules for classification: 1st points; 2nd goal difference; 3rd goals scored; 4th head-to-head; 5th away goals scored; 6th draw

=== Results ===
Home \ Away	ACD	AMX	CRH	DOR	DUR	GAC	GTB	IND	LEO	LOB	MOR	PRC	PUE	PUM	RAY	SAL	SAN	TAM	TAP	TEC	TGR	TRC	UAT	ZAC
Académicos			4–4		0–0	2–1			1–2				1–0		1–1	1–1				1–2				
At. Mexiquense				1–0	0–0		4–1	1–2				1–1		2–3	3–3							1–2		
Cruz Azul Hidalgo		0–0				1–0			1–0	0–1								1–0			3–0	4–3	0–0	
Dorados	1–0					0–1				3–2						1–1	1–2	1–1	4–1	1–0		1–1		
Durango				1–0					2–1	2–2	1–0	0–0					2–1	1–1			1–0	1–1		
Gallos de Caliente					1–1				2–2					0–1		1–1				1–0	1–0		3–2	3–2
Guerreros			1–3	0–0	2–2					2–2		1–0	2–3					1–0					4–0	0–1
Indios			1–1	4–0	1–2		2–3			1–0		0–0	1–2					2–0						2–0
León				4–2							3–1	1–0		2–1					3–0		2–1		1–2	0–1
Lobos BUAP		1–1									4–0			3–2	3–2	1–3			1–3			1–0	1–0	1–0
Monarcas	1–0	0–2		1–1		0–1	2–1	0–2									1–1		0–1	2–3				
Pegaso Real Colima	0–2			1–1		1–2				2–0	2–1							3–1	2–0			1–0		
Puebla		2–1	0–0			0–0			2–0	3–3								2–0			4–0		1–1	
Pumas Morelos	0–1		0–1				1–0	3–4					2–2		2–0		0–1			3–0				
Rayados			4–1			3–1	2–3	1–3	1–2				2–1					0–3			2–0			2–1
Salamanca		1–1			2–1		1–1	2–0	3–0		4–0	3–1					2–1				0–0			
Santos	3–1		0–0			0–1			4–2			0–5	1–1		0–0					3–3	1–0			
Tampico Madero		1–1								2–1	2–1			0–2		1–2			4–1			1–1	3–0	
Tapatío	1–1	1–1			2–0	0–2	1–0	1–2								2–2	4–3			1–1				
Tecos			1–2		0–0				6–1			1–1	1–2		2–0	2–0					1–1			
Tigres Mochis	2–1			1–1							3–1	1–0		0–1					2–2				2–1	0–1
TR Coatzacoalcos							2–2	3–2			3–1		1–2	1–0	1–0	2–0			3–1					
UAT	3–2	2–0						2–1						2–2	0–1		2–1			3–1		2–2		4–1
Zacatepec	1–2	4–0	0–1										1–3	3–2			1–3	0–0		2–0		2–1		

Updated to match(es) played on 26 November 2006. Source: Ascenso MX
Legend: Blue = home team win; Yellow = draw; Red = away team win.

=== Liguilla ===
Quarter-finals
1	Salamanca	2	2	4
8	León	1	0	1
4	Gallos de Caliente (*)	1	1	2
5	Indios	1	1	2
2	Puebla	2	3	5
7	TR Coatzacoalcos	2	1	3
3	Cruz Azul Hidalgo	1	2	3
6	Durango	1	1	2

Semi-finals
1	Salamanca	0	1	1
4	Gallos de Caliente	0	0	0
2	Puebla (*)	0	2	2
3	Cruz Azul Hidalgo	2	0	2

Final
1	Salamanca	1	2	3
2	Puebla (p.)	1	2	3

(*) Team won the series as best-seeded team.

==== Quarter-finals ====
Team 1	Agg.	Team 2	1st leg	2nd leg
Salamanca	4–1	León	2–1	2–0
Gallos de Caliente	2–2	Indios	1–1	1–1
Puebla	5–3	TR Coatzacoalcos	2–2	3–1
Cruz Azul Hidalgo	3–2	Durango	1–1	2–1

===== First leg =====
30 November 2006	Durango	1-1	Cruz Azul Hidalgo	Durango
16:00	Zwaricz 44'	Report	Velasco 59'	Stadium: Estadio Francisco Zarco; Attendance: 8,000; Referee: Oliver Enríque Quiroz Díaz

30 November 2006	TR Coatzacoalcos	2-2	Puebla	Coatzacoalcos
20:00	Granoche 57', 88'	Report	González 54', 82'	Stadium: Estadio Rafael Hernández Ochoa; Attendance: 4,500; Referee: Mauricio Rafael Morales Ovalle

30 November 2006	León	1-2	Salamanca	León
20:30	Fierros 25'	Report	Araujo 27'; Enríquez 32'	Stadium: Estadio León; Attendance: 15,000; Referee: Jaime Herrera Garduño

1 December 2006	Indios	1-1	Gallos de Caliente	Ciudad Juárez
20:00	Gigena 80'	Report	Avilán 11'	Stadium: Estadio Olímpico Benito Juárez; Attendance: 12,000; Referee: Jesús Fabricio Morales Bojorquez

===== Second leg =====
3 December 2006	Salamanca	2-0 (4-1 agg.)	León	Salamanca
12:00	Enríquez 40', 50'	Report		Stadium: Estadio Olímpico Sección 24; Attendance: 10,000; Referee: Héctor Manuel Gómez Ponce

3 December 2006	Puebla	3-1 (5-3 agg.)	TR Coatzacoalcos	Puebla
12:00	Granoche 38' (own); González 57', 90'	Report	Capetillo 10'	Stadium: Estadio Cuauhtémoc; Attendance: 15,000; Referee: Jorge Eduardo Gasso Flores

3 December 2006	Cruz Azul Hidalgo	2-1 (3-2 agg.)	Durango	Jasso
12:00	Cortés 52'; Gómez 57'	Report	Zwaricz 40'	Stadium: Estadio 10 de Diciembre; Attendance: 2,000; Referee: Erim Ramírez Ulloa

3 December 2006	Gallos de Caliente	1-1 (1-1 agg.)	Indios	Tijuana
13:00	Rizo 53'	Report	Esqueda 33'	Stadium: Unidad Deportiva CREA; Attendance: 1,000; Referee: Ricardo Arellano Nieves

==== Semi-finals ====
Team 1	Agg.	Team 2	1st leg	2nd leg
Salamanca	1–0	Gallos de Caliente	0–0	1–0
Puebla	2–2	Cruz Azul Hidalgo	0–2	2–0

===== First leg =====
7 December 2006	Gallos de Caliente	0-0	Salamanca	Tijuana
13:00		Report		Stadium: Unidad Deportiva CREA

7 December 2006	Cruz Azul Hidalgo	2-0	Puebla	Jasso
15:00	Fuentes 66'; Márquez 89'	Report		Stadium: Estadio 10 de Diciembre; Attendance: 5,000; Referee: Francisco Chacón Gutiérrez

===== Second leg =====
10 December 2006	Salamanca	1-0 (1-0 agg.)	Gallos de Caliente	Salamanca
12:00	Begines 42'	Report		Stadium: Estadio Olímpico Sección 24; Attendance: 6,000; Referee: Hugo León Guajardo

10 December 2006	Puebla	2-0 (2-2 agg.)	Cruz Azul Hidalgo	Puebla
12:00	Robles 32'; Rosas (?)	Report		Stadium: Estadio Cuauhtémoc

==== Final ====
Team 1	Agg.	Team 2	1st leg	2nd leg
Salamanca	3–3	Puebla (p.)	1–1	2–2

===== First leg =====
14 December 2006	Puebla	1-1	Salamanca	Puebla
20:30	Rosas 84'	Report	Enríquez 60'	Stadium: Estadio Cuauhtémoc; Attendance: 20,000; Referee: Marco Antonio Rodríguez Moreno

===== Second leg =====
17 December 2006	Salamanca	2-2 (3-3 agg.) (5-6 p)	Puebla	Salamanca
12:00	Enríquez 36'; Begines 89'	Report	Noriega 4'; González 69'	Stadium: Estadio Olímpico Sección 24; Attendance: 15,000; Referee: Armando Archundia Téllez

Apertura 2006 winners

2nd title

== Clausura 2007 ==
=== Group league tables ===
==== Group 1 ====
Pos	Team	Pld	W	D	L	GF	GA	GD	Pts
1	Dorados	17	13	1	3	33	10	+23	40
2	Celaya	17	10	5	2	27	13	+14	35
3	León	17	10	3	4	18	16	+2	33
4	Pegaso Real Colima	17	8	5	4	30	21	+9	29
5	Salamanca	17	6	9	2	21	15	+6	27
6	Monarcas Morelia 'A'	17	7	2	8	26	31	−5	23
7	Tapatío	17	5	5	7	18	20	−2	20
8	Tigres Mochis	17	4	7	6	15	22	−7	19
9	Santos Laguna 'A'	17	4	4	9	22	30	−8	16
10	Durango	17	3	6	8	16	20	−4	15
11	Tecos 'A'	17	3	5	9	16	28	−12	14
12	Académicos	17	2	4	11	12	39	−27	10

==== Group 2 ====
Pos	Team	Pld	W	D	L	GF	GA	GD	Pts
1	Puebla	17	11	3	3	42	16	+26	36
2	Cruz Azul Hidalgo	17	11	1	5	34	22	+12	34
3	Pumas Morelos	17	8	5	4	20	14	+6	29
4	TR Coatzacoalcos	17	8	4	5	25	21	+4	28
5	Socio Águila	17	7	5	5	24	21	+3	26
6	Tijuana	17	8	1	8	26	30	−4	25
7	Indios	17	6	5	6	25	21	+4	23
8	Rayados 'A'	17	5	5	7	17	22	−5	20
9	UAT	17	5	3	9	20	23	−3	18
10	Lobos BUAP	17	5	2	10	23	24	−1	17
11	Tampico Madero	17	3	5	9	20	30	−10	14
12	Atlético Mexiquense	17	3	3	11	12	23	−11	12

Source: Ascenso MX and Soccerway
Rules for classification: 1st points; 2nd goal difference; 3rd goals scored; 4th head-to-head; 5th away goals scored; 6th draw

=== Results ===
Home \ Away	ACD	AMX	CEL	CRH	DOR	DUR	IND	LEO	LOB	MOR	PRC	PUE	PUM	RAY	SAL	SAN	TAM	TAP	TEC	TGR	TIJ	TRC	UAT	SAG
Académicos					0–1					0–4	1–6		0–1			2–0		2–2		3–2			0–0	1–2
At. Mexiquense				0–2					1–2	0–0		3–1			0–0		2–3	0–2					1–1	1–0
Celaya	5–0			1–0	2–1					1–1	2–1	3–2		1–0		2–0		2–0						
Cruz Azul Hidalgo	2–0						1–0					0–1	2–0	2–1		1–4			6–1		0–1			2–1
Dorados		1–0				1–0	1–0			7–0	0–2									4–1	3–2			
Durango	0–0	0–1	1–1				1–1								3–1			1–1	0–0		2–3			
Indios		3–1								3–1			1–1	1–1	0–1			0–1				2–1	2–0	
León	1–0		2–1	1–2		1–0						0–5		1–0	1–1	2–1			2–1					
Lobos BUAP				2–4	1–4	1–2	2–5				1–2	1–3					4–1				3–1			
Monarcas						3–1		1–2	1–2		3–1				0–2		2–1			1–2		3–2		
Pegaso Real Colima		1–0				1–0	3–3	2–1							1–1	2–2			2–2	1–1	2–0			
Puebla	7–1						2–1						2–1	5–1		4–1			0–1		2–0	1–1		0–0
Pumas Morelos		2–1	0–0					0–0	2–1								2–2			3–0		1–1	0–2	2–0
Rayados	1–1	2–1							1–1				1–0			1–3			1–0			2–2	1–1	
Salamanca	3–0		1–1		1–1				0–0								2–1	2–1	0–1			2–1		
Santos					0–1	1–3				0–1			0–1		3–3			1–0					2–0	3–3
Tampico Madero				2–3	0–2	1–1	1–1				2–0	2–1		0–2							1–2			1–1
Tapatío					0–1			0–1	0–1	2–0	2–1						1–1			2–1		2–2		
Tecos	2–1		0–1		0–3					1–2			0–2			4–1		1–1					0–1	2–2
Tigres Mochis			1–0	1–1		2–1		0–0				1–1		0–1	0–0	0–0			1–1					
Tijuana		2–0					0–2			4–3			1–2	2–1	1–1			3–1				2–1		
TR Coatzacoalcos		1–0		3–2	1–0	1–0			2–1		0–2						1–0						1–0	4–1
UAT			1–2	3–4				0–2	4–0			0–3					3–1			1–2	3–0			
Socio Águila			2–2				3–0	0–1	1–0					1–0						2–0	3–2		2–0	

Updated to match(es) played on 29 April 2007. Source: Ascenso MX
Legend: Blue = home team win; Yellow = draw; Red = away team win.

=== Liguilla ===
Quarter-finals
1	Dorados (*)	1	1	2
8	TR Coatzacoalcos	0	2	2
3	Celaya (Note: Celaya was disqualified for illegal alignment)	0	-	0
6	Pegaso Real Colima	2	-	2
2	Puebla	3	1	4
7	Pumas Morelos	2	1	3
4	Cruz Azul Hidalgo	3	0	3
5	León	1	3	4

Semi-finals
1	Dorados	0	1	1
6	Pegaso Real Colima	0	0	0
2	Puebla	0	3	3
5	León	2	3	5

Final
1	Dorados	1	4	5
5	León	3	1	4

(*) The team won the series as best-seeded team.

==== Quarter-finals ====
Team 1	Agg.	Team 2	1st leg	2nd leg
Dorados	2–2	TR Coatzacoalcos	1–0	1–2
Celaya	0–2	Pegaso Real Colima	0–2	x–x
Puebla	4–3	Pumas Morelos	3–2	1–1
Cruz Azul Hidalgo	3–4	León	3–1	0–3

===== First leg =====
2 May 2007	TR Coatzacoalcos	0-1	Dorados	Coatzacoalcos
17:00		Report		Stadium: Estadio Rafael Hernández Ochoa

3 May 2007	Pumas Morelos	2-3	Puebla	Cuernavaca
17:00	Toledo 48'; Jaramillo 72'	Report	González 37', 44'; Zamogilny 62'	Stadium: Estadio Centenario; Attendance: 7,000; Referee: Francisco Chacón Gutiérrez

3 May 2007	Pegaso Real Colima	2-2	Celaya	Colima
20:00	García 13'; Domínguez 84'	Report	Ojeda 27'; Nurse 49'	Stadium: Estadio Colima; Attendance: 7,500; Referee: Héctor Manuel Gómez Ponce

3 May 2007	León	1-3	Cruz Azul Hidalgo	León
20:30	Mejía 3'	Report	Orozco 2'; Ortiz 5'; Márquez 39'	Stadium: Nou Camp; Attendance: 25,000; Referee: Jesús Fabricio Morales Bojorquez

===== Second leg =====
5 May 2007	Dorados	1-2 (2-2 agg.)	TR Coatzacoalcos	Culiacán
19:00	Casartelli 56'	Report	Pérez 64'; Granoche 90+1'	Stadium: Estadio Banorte; Attendance: 15,000; Referee: Armando Archundia Téllez

6 May 2007	Puebla	1-1 (4-3 agg.)	Pumas Morelos	Puebla
12:00	Ruíz 85'	Report	Caprari 32'	Stadium: Estadio Cuauhtémoc; Attendance: 20,000; Referee: Oliver Enrique Quiroz Díaz

6 May 2007	Cruz Azul Hidalgo	0-3 (3-4 agg.)	León	Jasso
12:00		Report	Gómez 33'; Sotilli 38'; Castro 60'	Stadium: Estadio 10 de Diciembre; Attendance: 3,000; Referee: Hugo León Guajardo

==== Semi-finals ====
Team 1	Agg.	Team 2	1st leg	2nd leg
Dorados	1–0	Pegaso Real Colima	0–0	1–0
Puebla	3–5	León	0–2	3–3

===== First leg =====
9 May 2007	Pegaso Real Colima	0-0	Dorados	Colima
20:00		Report		Stadium: Estadio Colima; Attendance: 8,000; Referee: Manuel Ernesto Glower Guerra

10 May 2007	León	2-0	Puebla	León
20:30		Report		Stadium: Nou Camp

===== Second leg =====
12 May 2007	Dorados	1-0 (1-0 agg.)	Pegaso Real Colima	Culiacán
19:00	Casartelli 13'	Report		Stadium: Estadio Banorte; Attendance: 19,000; Referee: Hugo León Guajardo

13 May 2007	Puebla	3-3 (3-5 agg.)	León	Puebla
12:00	Ruíz 52'; Rosas 69'; González 79'	Report	Gómez 27'; Rojas 47'; Vázquez 70'	Stadium: Estadio Cuauhtémoc; Attendance: 38,000; Referee: Jorge Eduardo Gasso Flores

==== Final ====
Team 1	Agg.	Team 2	1st leg	2nd leg
Dorados'	5–4	León	1–3	4–1

===== First leg =====
16 May 2007	León	3-1	Dorados	León
20:30	Fierros 19'; Sotilli 30'; Mejía 52'	Report	Casartelli 73'	Stadium: Nou Camp; Attendance: 33,000; Referee: Roberto García Orozco

===== Second leg =====
19 May 2007	Dorados	4-1 (5-4 agg.)	León	Culiacán
19:00	Padilla 23', 47'; Silva 56'; Gaytán 61'	Report	Sotilli 50'	Stadium: Estadio Banorte; Attendance: 20,000

Clausura 2007 winners

2nd title

== Relegation table ==
Pos.	Team	Pld.	Pts.	Ave.	GD
20.	Santos Laguna 'A'	34	39	1.1471	-9
21.	Atlético Mexiquense	110	126	1.1455	-15
22.	Académicos	72	81	1.1250	-22
23.	Tecos 'A'	34	34	1.0000	-12
24.	Monarcas Morelia 'A'	34	31	0.9198	-27

== Campeón de Ascenso 2007 ==
The promotion final faced Puebla against Dorados de Sinaloa to determine the winner of the First Division Promotion. Puebla was the winner.

Team 1	Agg.	Team 2	1st leg	2nd leg
Puebla	4–3	Sinaloa	1–1	3–2

=== First leg ===
23 May 2007	Sinaloa	1-1	Puebla	Culiacán
21:00	Casartelli 74'	Report	González 55'	Stadium: Estadio Banorte; Attendance: 21,000; Referee: Hugo León Guajardo

=== Second leg ===
26 May 2007	Puebla	3-2 (4-3 agg.)	Sinaloa	Puebla
14:00	González 8', 45'; Ruíz 27'	Report	Padilla 34'; Silva 86'	Stadium: Estadio Cuauhtémoc; Attendance: 40,000

Champions

1st title
