= Daley Mena =

Colombian footballer (born 1985)

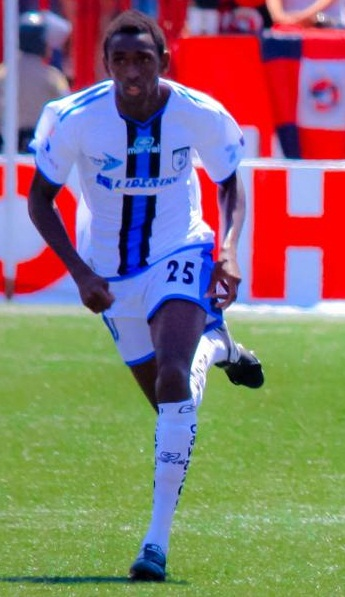
- Mena while playing for Querétaro

Personal information
- Full name: Daley Yesid Mena Palomeque
- Date of birth: 7 February 1985 (age 41)
- Place of birth: Quibdó, Colombia
- Height: 1.80 m (5 ft 11 in)
- Position: Striker

Senior career*
Years	Team	Apps	(Gls)
2006–2011	Danubio FC	119	(12)
2009	→ Colón (loan)	19	(0)
2011–2012	Querétaro FC	18	(2)
2012–2013	Dorados		
2013–2014	→ Deportivo Cali (loan)		
2015–2016	Rocha		
2016	Boyacá Chicó FC		
2016	Unión Comercio		
2017–2018	CD Audaz	42	(16)
2018	Alianza FC	13	(3)
2019–2020	Sonsonate FC		
2020	Once Deportivo		
- * Club domestic league appearances and goals as of 30 January 2019

Daley Yesid Mena Palomeque (born 7 February 1985) is a Colombian professional footballer, who plays as a striker.

Mena began his playing career in Uruguay with Danubio, in 2009 he joined Colón de Santa Fe of Argentina but returned to Danubio after only one season.

In 2011 he became a Querétaro player.

== Club career ==
=== Audaz ===
Mena signed with Audaz of the Salvadoran Primera División in the Apertura 2017 tournament. Audaz was the team promoted in that tournament. He greatest success with the team of San Vicente was reaching the semi-finals of the Clausura 2018 tournament, after defeating FAS 3–2 in the Estadio Óscar Quiteño. However, Audaz was eliminated by Santa Tecla after a 2–5 defeat on aggregate.

=== Alianza ===
Mena signed with Alianza in the Apertura 2018 tournament. He scored two goals in a 5–2 victory against Sonsonate in the Estadio Anna Mercedes Campos. Alianza got to qualify for the quarter-finals of the Apertura 2018 after finishing in first position with 49 points.

== Honours ==
Danubio

- Uruguayan Primera División (1): 2006–07

Dorados

- Copa MX (1): Apertura 2012
