= Rafael Murguía =

Mexican footballer (born 1986)

Personal information
- Full name: Rafael Murguía González
- Date of birth: 16 February 1986 (age 40)
- Place of birth: Guadalajara, Mexico
- Height: 1.79 m (5 ft 10 in)
- Position: Forward

Youth career
- Coyotes de Sonora

Senior career*
Years	Team	Apps	(Gls)
2006–2007	Club Atlas	16	(3)
2008–2013	La Piedad	101	(28)
2009	→ Dorados de Sinaloa (loan)	7	(1)
2013	Veracruz	4	(0)
2014	Atlético San Luis	8	(1)
2014–2017	Celaya	65	(13)
2018	Deportivo Mictlán	?	(?)

International career
2003	Mexico U17	4	(1)
- * Club domestic league appearances and goals

Rafael Murguía González (born 16 February 1986) is a former Mexican football player who last played as a striker for Deportivo Mictlán in Guatemala. He also played for Mexico in the 2003 FIFA U-17 World Championship in Finland.
