= Alfredo Frausto =

Mexican footballer (born 1983)

Personal information
- Full name: Alfredo Frausto Mendoza
- Date of birth: 12 January 1983 (age 43)
- Place of birth: León, Guanajuato, Mexico
- Height: 1.89 m (6 ft 2 1/2 in)
- Position: Goalkeeper

Senior career*
Years	Team	Apps	(Gls)
2003–2005	León	24	(0)
2005–2007	Correcaminos UAT	38	(0)
2006	→ Tampico Madero (loan)	16	(0)
2007	Petroleros de Salamanca	2	(0)
2008	Lobos BUAP	3	(0)
2009	San Luis	0	(0)
2010	Guerreros de Hermosillo	13	(0)
2011	Leones Negros UdeG	8	(0)
2011–2012	Mérida	27	(0)
2012–2016	Dorados de Sinaloa	39	(1)
2013–2014	→ Jaguares (loan)	17	(0)
2014	→ Puebla (loan)	3	(0)
2016	→ Cafetaleros (loan)	9	(0)
- * Club domestic league appearances and goals as of May 19, 2009

Alfredo Frausto Mendoza (born January 12, 1983) is a Mexican retired professional footballer.
