= Emanuel García =

Argentine footballer

Personal information
- Full name: Emanuel Alejandro García
- Date of birth: 6 July 1990 (age 36)
- Place of birth: Diamante, Argentina
- Position: Midfielder

Youth career
- 2004–2008: Rosario Central

Senior career*
Years	Team	Apps	(Gls)
2008–2011	Rosario Central	3	(0)
2011–2012	Mitre	18	(0)
2012–2013	Argentino	18	(0)
- * Club domestic league appearances and goals

Emanuel Alejandro García (born 6 July 1990) is an Argentine footballer who plays as a midfielder. He is currently a free agent.

== Career ==
García started his career with Rosario Central, joining the club in 2004 following a trial in the previous year. He made his professional bow on 22 November 2008 during a home defeat to Independiente, prior to also starting fixtures in December against Tigre and Godoy Cruz; with the midfielder being sent off in the latter match. García remained for two further seasons, the first of which ended with relegation in 2009–10, but didn't make any more appearances; appearing on the bench just once, in May 2011 versus Unión Santa Fe. 2011 saw García secure a move to Mitre of Torneo Argentino B, before moving to Torneo Argentino A in 2012 with Argentino.

== Career statistics ==
As of 17 January 2019.

Club statistics
Club	Season	League			Cup		Continental		Other		Total	
Club	Season	Division	Apps	Goals	Apps	Goals	Apps	Goals	Apps	Goals	Apps	Goals
Rosario Central	2008–09	Primera División	3	0	0	0	—		0	0	3	0
Rosario Central	2009–10	Primera División	0	0	0	0	—		0	0	0	0
Rosario Central	2010–11	Primera B Nacional	0	0	0	0	—		0	0	0	0
Rosario Central	Total		3	0	0	0	—		0	0	3	0
Mitre	2011–12	Torneo Argentino B	18	0	0	0	—		0	0	18	0
Argentino	2012–13	Torneo Argentino A	18	0	0	0	—		0	0	18	0
Career total			39	0	0	0	—		0	0	39	0
