= Gabriel España =

Mexican footballer (born 1988)

Personal information
- Full name: Gabriel España Pérez
- Date of birth: 23 December 1988 (age 37)
- Place of birth: Mexico City, Mexico
- Height: 1.79 m (5 ft 10 in)
- Position: Defender

Team information
- Current team: Cancún (assistant)

Senior career*
Years	Team	Apps	(Gls)
2007–2009	Chiapas	2	(0)
2009–2020	Atlante	26	(0)
2011–2015	→ Mérida (loan)	31	(0)
2015–2016	→ Zacatepec (loan)	13	(1)

Managerial career
- 2021: Petroleros SJR (Assistant)
- 2021–2022: Querétaro Reserves and Academy
- 2023: UAT (assistant)
- 2024–: Cancún (assistant)
- * Club domestic league appearances and goals

Gabriel España (born December 23, 1988) is a Mexican former professional footballer who last played for Atlante.
