= Rodolfo Vilchis =

Mexican footballer (born 1989)

Personal information
- Full name: Rodolfo Vilchis Cruz
- Date of birth: 15 September 1989 (age 37)
- Place of birth: Zitácuaro, Michoacan, Mexico
- Height: 1.67 m (5 ft 6 in)
- Position: Winger

Team information
- Current team: Halcones (assistant)

Senior career*
| Years | Team | Apps | (Gls) |
| 2008–2013 | Morelia | 5 | (0) |
| 2010 | → Mérida (loan) | 10 | (0) |
| 2011 | → Atlante UTN (loan) | 3 | (0) |
| 2011 | → Potros UAEM (loan) | 9 | (2) |
| 2012 | → Huixquilucan (loan) | 9 | (3) |
| 2012–2013 | → Neza (loan) | 17 | (5) |
| 2013 | → Delfines (loan) | 16 | (0) |
| 2014 | → Querétaro (loan) | 7 | (0) |
| 2014–2015 | Atlas | 4 | (0) |
| 2015 | → UdeG (loan) | 13 | (0) |
| 2016–2019 | Morelia | 77 | (5) |
| 2019 | → Correcaminos (loan) | 9 | (0) |
| 2020 | Zacatecas | 8 | (3) |
| 2021 | Oaxaca | 18 | (2) |

Managerial career
- 2025–2026: Halcones AFU
- 2026: Halcones
- 2026–: Halcones (assistant)
- * Club domestic league appearances and goals

Rodolfo Vilchis Cruz (born 15 September 1989) is a Mexican former professional footballer. He is popularly known by his nickname "Pipila".

== Biography ==
Vilchis began his career in the youth ranks of Monarcas Morelia in 2008. He spent most of his time with the team on loan to second division teams, helping Neza to the Championship in 2012–2013. He returned to the First Division with Querétaro F.C. for the Clausura 2014, and moved to Atlas for the Apertura 2014.

== Club career ==
=== Querétaro ===
Vilchis played with Querétaro during the Clausura 2014, appearing in fifteen games with the team. He scored in his first appearance with the team against UNAM on January 10, 2014.

=== Atlas ===
The Mexican club signed Vilchis on June 5, 2014. Vilchis fractured his fifth metatarsus on July 21 and was ruled out of the next eight games of the Apertura 2014.
