= Luis Martínez (footballer, born 1987) =

Mexican footballer

Personal information
- Full name: Luis Antonio Martínez Jiménez
- Date of birth: 29 April 1987 (age 39)
- Place of birth: Zacapoaxtla, Puebla, Mexico
- Height: 1.73 m (5 ft 8 in)
- Position: Defensive midfielder

Senior career*
| Years | Team | Apps | (Gls) |
| 2005–2007 | Veracruz | 14 | (0) |
| 2009–2011 | Orizaba | 85 | (0) |
| 2011–2013 | La Piedad | 63 | (3) |
| 2013–2019 | Veracruz | 82 | (0) |
- * Club domestic league appearances and goals as of 5 February 2019

Luis Antonio Martínez Jiménez (born April 29, 1987) is a former Mexican professional footballer.
