= Rolando Sena =

Mexican footballer (born 1990)

Rolando Daniel Sena Ruíz (born February 6, 1990, in Ciudad Victoria) is a Mexican professional footballer who played as a defender for UAT.
