= César Morales (footballer) =

Mexican footballer (born 1986)

César Rosario Morales Durán (Note: In this Spanish name, the first or paternal surname is Morales and the second or maternal family name is Durán.) (born 5 October 1986) is a Mexican former professional footballer who last played for Club Xelajú MC. He hails from Nío, Guasave Municipality, Sinaloa.
