= Saúl García (footballer, born 1986) =

Mexican footballer

Personal information
- Full name: Saúl García Ávila
- Date of birth: 7 June 1986 (age 40)
- Place of birth: León, Mexico
- Height: 1.77 m (5 ft 10 in)
- Position: Winger

Youth career
- Guadalajara

Senior career*
Years	Team	Apps	(Gls)
2005–2008	Guadalajara	0	(0)
2006–2007	→ Real Colima (loan)	1	(0)
2007–2008	→ Tijuana (loan)	16	(0)
2008	León	22	(2)
2009	Potros Neza	14	(2)
2009–2010	Atlante	17	(0)
2011	La Piedad	11	(0)
2011	Merida	7	(0)
- * Club domestic league appearances and goals as of 2 June 2010

Saúl García Ávila (born 7 June 1986) is a Mexican former footballer, who last played as a winger for Mexican side Mérida in the Primera División.

== Club career ==
García started his career in the Chivas de Guadalajara youth systems. After playing for Chivas' Primera Division A teams for two seasons, he was traded to Pegaso Real Colima, the former filial team for Atlante, where he made it to the semifinal in the Clausura 2007 tournament. After playing two seasons for Club Tijuana, he rejoined Atlante's system by signing with their new filial, Potros Chetumal.

He made his professional debut on April 26, 2009, during a 1–0 loss to CF Monterrey. He started the game and played 67 minutes.
