= Lampros Kontogiannis =

Mexican footballer (born 1988)

Personal information
- Full name: Lampros Kontogiannis Gómez
- Date of birth: 1 August 1988 (age 38)
- Place of birth: Manzanillo, Colima, Mexico
- Height: 1.84 m (6 ft 1/2 in)
- Position: Centre-back

Youth career
- 2003–2004: AEK Athens
- 2004–2007: Olympiacos
- 2007–2008: América

Senior career*
Years	Team	Apps	(Gls)
2008–2010	América	7	(0)
2010–2011	Orizaba	36	(0)
2011–2013	Tigres UANL	2	(0)
2012–2013	→ Correcaminos (loan)	9	(0)
2014–2016	Melgar	77	(2)
2016	Defensor La Bocana	13	(0)
2016–2018	Cusco	83	(4)
2019	Veracruz	25	(0)
2020–2021	Cienciano	30	(0)
Medal record
Melgar
Winner	Peruvian League	2015
- * Club domestic league appearances and goals as of 13 January 2022

Lampros Kontogiannis Gómez (Greek: Λάμπρος Κοντογιάννης Γκόμεζ; born 1 August 1988) is a former Mexican professional footballer who played as a centre-back.

== Club career ==
Kontogiannis began his career with Segunda División side F.S. Manzanillo in the 2007–08 season. He then signed a contract in May 2008 with Club América. He debuted with América on 17 August 2008 coming in as a sub in the 66 minute against Pachuca in a 1–1 draw.

He also played for the reserve side Socio Águila in the 2008–09 season. In June 2011, he moved to club UANL located in Monterrey.

== Personal life ==
Kontogiannis is of Greek descent which would have allowed him to play for the Greece national team as well as the Mexico national team having been born in Mexico. His father is from Greece and his mother from Mexico.

== Honours ==
Tigres UANL

- Mexican Primera División: Apertura 2011

Melgar

- Peruvian Primera División: 2015
