= Mario Padilla =

Mexican footballer (born 1985)

Personal information
- Full name: Mario Salvador Padilla Buenrostro
- Date of birth: 12 July 1985 (age 41)
- Place of birth: Ocotlán, Mexico
- Height: 1.77 m (5 ft 10 in)
- Position: Centre-forward

Senior career*
Years	Team	Apps	(Gls)
2004–2005	Mérida	9	(1)
2005–2014	Necaxa	30	(0)
2007–2008	→ Dorados de Sinaloa (loan)	43	(11)
2009	→ Tijuana (loan)	12	(0)
2011–2013	→ Dorados de Sinaloa (loan)	30	(3)
2013–2014	→ Oaxaca (loan)	22	(4)
2015–2016	Oaxaca	6	(0)
- * Club domestic league appearances and goals

Mario Salvador Padilla Buenrostro (born 12 July 1985) is a Mexican former professional footballer.
