= Diego Menghi =

Argentine footballer

Personal information
- Full name: Diego Sebastián Menghi
- Date of birth: 17 May 1985 (age 41)
- Place of birth: Justiniano Posse, Argentina
- Height: 1.84 m (6 ft 0 in)
- Position: Centre-back

Youth career
- Racing Club

Senior career*
Years	Team	Apps	(Gls)
2006–2009	Racing Club	33	(2)
2008–2009	→ Atlético de Rafaela (loan)	19	(2)
2010	San Luis Quillota	5	(0)
2010–2011	Independiente Rivadavia	35	(4)
2011–2012	Correcaminos UAT	37	(4)
2012–2014	Atlético Venezuela	59	(7)
2014–2016	Alebrijes de Oaxaca	67	(4)
2017–2018	Tampico Madero	63	(2)
2019	Atlético Venezuela	16	(0)
2019	Deportivo Capiatá	11	(2)
2020–2021	Chacarita Juniors	13	(0)
2021	Colegiales	4	(0)
- * Club domestic league appearances and goals as of 19:32, 10 July 2022 (UTC)

Diego Sebastián Menghi (born 17 May 1985, in Justiniano Posse) is an Argentine footballer, who plays as a centre-back.

== Career ==
Menghi began his professional playing career in 2006 with Racing Club de Avellaneda. He made his debut in the Primera División in a 0–2 home defeat to Vélez Sarsfiels on 11 February 2006. He scored his first goal for the club to earn a 1–0 home win against San Lorenzo on 28 March 2006.

In 2008, he joined 2nd division side Atlético de Rafaela on loan. He helped the club to achieve a 3rd-place finish and earn a playoff place against Gimnasia de La Plata, he played in both legs of the playoff that finished 3–3 on aggregate meaning that Rafaela were not promoted. After this disappointment he returned to Racing but has failed to earn back a place in the first team. At the beginning of 2010 he was released by the club.

In 2010, he's plays for San Luis Quillota.
