= Cristian Rojas =

Chilean footballer (born 1985)

Personal information
- Full name: Cristian Manuel Rojas Sanhueza
- Date of birth: 19 December 1985 (age 40)
- Place of birth: María Elena, Chile
- Height: 1.78 m (5 ft 10 in)
- Position: Defender

Youth career
- Deportes Antofagasta

Senior career*
Years	Team	Apps	(Gls)
2005–2010	Deportes Antofagasta	106	(3)
2010–2012	Cobreloa	42	(0)
2012	Curicó Unido	5	(1)
2013–2022	Deportes Antofagasta	125	(2)
Total		278	(6)
- * Club domestic league appearances and goals

Cristian Manuel Rojas Sanhueza (born 19 December 1985) is a Chilean former professional footballer who played as a defender.

== Personal life ==
He is usually known by his nickname, Chapa.

At the same time he was a footballer, he became a risk manager and got a Sports management degree.
