= Fernando Sinecio González =

Mexican footballer (born 1986)

Personal information
- Full name: Fernando Sinecio González Torres
- Date of birth: 16 June 1986 (age 40)
- Place of birth: Toluca, Mexico
- Height: 1.74 m (5 ft 8 1/2 in)
- Position: Forward

Youth career
- Cruz Azul

Senior career*
| Years | Team | Apps | (Gls) |
| 2006–2007 | Cruz Azul Hidalgo | 15 | (4) |
| 2008 | Potros UAEM | 28 | (18) |
| 2009 | Cruz Azul Hidalgo | 19 | (8) |
| 2010–2011 | Tiburones Rojos de Veracruz | 8 | (0) |
| 2006–2007 | Reboceros de La Piedad | 9 | (2) |
| 2013 | Cruz Azul Hidalgo | 2 | (0) |
| 2014 | Delfines | 2 | (1) |
| 2014–2015 | Correcaminos UAT | 7 | (0) |
| 2017 | Potros UAEM | 0 | (0) |
- * Club domestic league appearances and goals as of September 23, 2017

Fernando Sinecio González Torres (born 16 June 1986) is a former Mexican footballer who last played as a forward for Correcaminos UAT.
