= Lorenzo Ramírez =

Mexican footballer (born 1985)

Personal information
- Full name: Lorenzo Antonio Ramírez Guzmán
- Date of birth: 11 June 1985 (age 41)
- Place of birth: Culiacán, Sinaloa, Mexico
- Height: 1.66 m (5 ft 5 1/2 in)
- Position: Midfielder

Senior career*
Years	Team	Apps	(Gls)
2005–2015	Dorados de Sinaloa	169	(11)
2005	→ Alacranes de Durango (loan)	9	(1)
2006	→ Tijuana (loan)	19	(0)
2011–2012	→ León (loan)	8	(0)
2014	→ Estudiantes de Altamira (loan)	5	(0)
2015	→ Murciélagos (loan)	4	(1)
- San Diego Sockers 2
- * Club domestic league appearances and goals as of May 19, 2009

Lorenzo Ramírez (born June 11, 1985) is a former Mexican professional footballer who plays for Murciélagos of Ascenso MX on loan from Sinaloa.
