= Sergio Rosas =

Mexican footballer (born 1984)

Personal information
- Full name: Sergio Rosas Castro
- Date of birth: 3 May 1984 (age 42)
- Place of birth: Puebla, Mexico
- Height: 1.62 m (5 ft 4 in)
- Position: Midfielder

Senior career*
Years	Team	Apps	(Gls)
2005–2014	Puebla	136	(12)
2010–2011	→ Tijuana (loan)	13	(0)
2011	→ Lobos BUAP (loan)	2	(0)
2012–2014	→ UAT (loan)	68	(6)
2015	Irapuato	13	(1)
2015–2016	UAT	16	(0)
2017–2019	UAT	51	(1)
- * Club domestic league appearances and goals

Sergio Rosas Castro (born 3 March 1984) is a Mexican former football midfielder.

He started his career with Puebla and made over 50 Primera appearances before moving to Tijuana.

He later played for Lobos BUAP, Correcaminos UAT and Irapuato.
