= Pablo Torres (footballer) =

Argentine footballer

Pablo Gabriel Torres (born March 10, 1984) is an Argentine former professional footballer who last played for Dorados de Sinaloa of the Ascenso MX.
