= Tomás Domínguez =

Mexican footballer (born 1986)

Personal information
- Full name: Tomás Bernardo Domínguez Taunton
- Date of birth: 14 February 1986 (age 40)
- Place of birth: Mexico City, Mexico
- Height: 1.72 m (5 ft 8 in)
- Position: Midfielder

Senior career*
Years	Team	Apps	(Gls)
2004–2006	Pegaso Anahuac		
2006–2007	Real de Colima	34	(1)
2007	Potros Chetumal	21	(0)
2007–2009	Atlante	2	(0)
2009–2010	Lobos BUAP	31	(1)
2010–2011	Alacranes de Durango	22	(0)
2011–2013	Correcaminos UAT	30	(3)
- * Club domestic league appearances and goals

Tomás Bernardo Domínguez Taunton (born 14 February 1986) is a Mexican former professional footballer who played as a midfielder.

Domínguez formerly played in Liga MX with Atlante, making his top-level debut on 23 February 2008 against Tigres UANL.
