= Michel García =

Mexican footballer (born 1986)

Personal information
- Full name: Michel Gibrant García García
- Date of birth: 27 August 1986 (age 40)
- Place of birth: Mexico City, Mexico
- Height: 1.73 m (5 ft 8 in)
- Position: Midfielder

Team information
- Current team: Necaxa U-17 (Assistant)

Youth career
- 2007–2009: América

Senior career*
Years	Team	Apps	(Gls)
2009–2012	América	2	(0)
2011	→ Orizaba (loan)	12	(0)
2012–2017	Necaxa	161	(6)
2017–2018	Tampico Madero	11	(0)
2018–2020	Alebrijes de Oaxaca	20	(2)
2020	Atlético Jalisco	0	(0)
2020	Halcones de Zapopan	0	(0)

Managerial career
- 2023–: Necaxa Reserves and Academy
- * Club domestic league appearances and goals

Michel Gibrant García García (Note: In this Spanish name, the first or paternal surname is García and the second or maternal family name is García.) (born 27 August 1986) is a Mexican football coach and a former player. He is coaching at the Necaxa Reserves and Academy.

== Club career ==
García made his professional football debut during the Bicentenario 2010 campaign.
