= Rodrigo Prieto (footballer) =

Mexican footballer (born 1983)

Personal information
- Full name: Rodrigo Prieto Aubert
- Date of birth: 8 February 1983 (age 43)
- Place of birth: Guadalajara, Jalisco, Mexico
- Height: 1.80 m (5 ft 11 in)
- Position: Forward

Team information
- Current team: FC Midtjylland (Assistant)

Senior career*
Years	Team	Apps	(Gls)
2003–2004	Monarcas Morelia	10	(0)
2004–2005	→ Mérida (loan)	41	(18)
2006	→ Cruz Azul (loan)	1	(0)
2007	→ Puebla (loan)	20	(7)
2007–2008	Mérida	23	(8)
2008	Carabobo	14	(8)
2009	Caracas	22	(12)
2010	Atlante	2	(0)
2010–2011	Dorados	18	(6)
2011–2013	Toros Neza	44	(21)
2013–2014	Delfines	30	(12)
2015–2016	Necaxa	45	(15)
2017	Atlético Zacatepec	19	(7)
2017–2018	FC Juárez	40	(8)
2019	Atlético Zacatepec	28	(7)
2020	Venados	20	(3)

Managerial career
- 2022–: FC Midtjylland (Assistant)
- * Club domestic league appearances and goals as of 23 January 2020

Rodrigo Prieto Aubert (born 8 February 1983) is a former Mexican footballer who last played for Venados as a striker in the Ascenso MX.

== Club career ==
Prieto previously played for Morelia and Cruz Azul in the Mexican Primera División; he also competed in second division for Puebla F.C. and Mérida F.C.
