= Jesús Sánchez (footballer, born 1984) =

Mexican footballer (born 1984)

Personal information
- Full name: Jesús Armando Sánchez Zamudio
- Date of birth: March 7, 1984 (age 42)
- Place of birth: Mexico City, Mexico
- Height: 1.84 m (6 ft 1/2 in)
- Positions: Defensive midfielder; centre-back

Senior career*
Years	Team	Apps	(Gls)
2007–2014	América	46	(0)
2011	→Veracruz (loan)	1	(0)
2011–2013	→La Piedad (loan)	58	(1)
2013–2014	→Veracruz (loan)	20	(1)
- * Club domestic league appearances and goals as of 21 September 2012

Jesús Armando "El Woody" Sánchez (born March 7, 1984) is a Mexican former footballer who began in Club América around the age of 10 and last played on loan to C.D. Veracruz.
