= Juan de Dios Hernández =

Mexican footballer (born 1986)

Personal information
- Full name: Juan de Dios Hernández Tagle
- Date of birth: 4 January 1986 (age 40)
- Place of birth: México City, Mexico
- Height: 1.72 m (5 ft 8 in)
- Position: Midfielder

Senior career*
Years	Team	Apps	(Gls)
2005	Cruz Azul	1	(0)
2005–2006	→ Atlante (loan)	3	(0)
2006–2007	Chiapas	11	(0)
2007–2008	Lobos BUAP	41	(17)
2008–2009	Puebla	8	(0)
2009–2010	Necaxa	49	(6)
2011	→ Veracruz (loan)	12	(0)
2011	→ Irapuato (loan)	6	(0)
2012–2014	Dorados	47	(5)
2014	Tijuana	8	(0)
2014–2015	Atlas F.C.	3	(0)
2015–2016	LD Alajuelense	9	(3)
2016–2017	Cafetaleros	12	(0)
2018	Atlante	2	(0)
2018	Zacatepec	7	(1)
- * Club domestic league appearances and goals as of 13 December 2016

Juan de Dios Hernández Tagle (born 4 January 1986) is a former Mexican football player who last played for Zacatepec in the Ascenso MX.

He made his debut with Cruz Azul on August 13, 2005, in a winning match against Tecos, 5–1.
