= Roberto Nurse =

Panamanian footballer (born 1983)

Personal information
- Full name: Roberto Antonio Nurse Anguiano
- Date of birth: 16 December 1983 (age 42)
- Place of birth: Cuernavaca, Morelos, Mexico
- Height: 6 ft 2 in (1.88 m)
- Position: Striker

Senior career*
Years	Team	Apps	(Gls)
2002–2003	Colibríes	3	(0)
2003	Zacatepec	27	(10)
2004–2005	Querétaro	38	(15)
2005–2006	León	27	(12)
2005–2006	Atlante	13	(0)
2006–2008	Querétaro	51	(18)
2006	→ Celaya (loan)	10	(3)
2008	Chivas USA	6	(0)
2009	Veracruz	12	(1)
2009	Guerreros de Hermosillo	11	(0)
2010–2011	Cruz Azul Hidalgo	46	(16)
2011–2012	La Piedad	30	(20)
2012–2015	UAT	80	(33)
2015	→ Sinaloa (loan)	32	(18)
2016–2020	Zacatecas	122	(65)
2020–2021	Pachuca	21	(1)
2021	Tlaxcala	15	(1)
2022	Achuapa	8	(0)

International career
2014–2022	Panama	20	(3)
- * Club domestic league appearances and goals as of 20 November 2021

Roberto Antonio Nurse Anguiano (born 16 December 1983) is a former professional footballer who played as a striker. Born in Mexico, he played for the Panama national team.

== Club career ==
Nurse is a three-year veteran of the Primera División (First Division), having made his top-flight debut with Colibríes de Morelos in 2003 at aged 19. From 2003 to 2005 he spent two years in the Primera División A, Mexico's second tier, with Cañeros de Zacatepec and Querétaro, before returning to the Primera División in 2005, playing 13 games with Atlante. Nurse was Querétaro's leading goalscorer in the Primera División A, registering a total of 17 goals between the Apertura 2007 and Clausura 2008 seasons.

Nurse signed for Chivas USA of Major League Soccer on 16 July 2008, and made his debut in Chivas's SuperLiga game against Santos Laguna the same day; he made his MLS debut on 9 August 2008, against Kansas City Wizards.

Veracruz signed Nurse for the Clausura 2009 tournament and after spells at Cruz Azul Hidalgo and La Piedad he joined UAT in June 2012. In December 2014 he moved on to Dorados de Sinaloa.

== International career ==
Born in Mexico to an Afro-Panamanian father and a Mexican mother, Nurse was eligible to play for Mexico or Panama and on 31 May 2014 he made his debut for the Panama national football team coming in as a substitute during a 1–1 tie against Serbia, and scored his first international goal for Panama on a 2–2 tie against Costa Rica during the 2014 Copa Centroamericana.

In May 2018 he was named in Panama's preliminary 35-man squad for the 2018 World Cup in Russia. However, he did not make the final 23.

== International goals ==
Scores and results list Panama's goal tally first.

No	Date	Venue	Opponent	Score	Result	Competition
1.	7 September 2014	Cotton Bowl, Dallas, Texas, United States	Costa Rica	2–0	2–2	2014 Copa Centroamericana
2.	14 November 2014	Estadio Cuscatlán, San Salvador, El Salvador	El Salvador	3–1	3–1	Friendly
3.	25 July 2015	PPL Park, Chester, Pennsylvania	United States	1–0	1(3)–1(2)	2015 CONCACAF Gold Cup

== Honours ==
Panama

- CONCACAF Gold Cup third place: 2015

Individual

- Ascenso MX Golden Boot: Clausura 2014, Clausura 2015, Apertura 2016, Apertura 2018

== See also ==
- Afro-Mexicans
- List of people from Morelos
