= Dorados de Sinaloa =

- Full name: Club Social y Deportivo Dorados de Sinaloa
- Nicknames: Los Dorados (The Dorados); El Gran Pez (The Great Fish); El Aurinegro (The Black Aurine)
- Short name: DOR, SIN
- Founded: 8 August 2003; 23 years ago
- Stadium: Estadio El Encanto
- Capacity: 20,195
- Owner: Servicios Profesionales de Operación S.A. de C.V.
- President: José Antonio Núñez
- Manager: Luis Orozco
- League: Liga de Expansión MX
- Apertura 2026: Regular phase: 13th of 16; Final phase: Not qualified
- Website: www.doradosfc.com.mx
Home colours	Away colours

Club Social y Deportivo Dorados de Sinaloa, simply known as Dorados de Sinaloa, is a professional football club based in Mazatlán, Sinaloa. The club competes in Liga de Expansión MX, the second level of Mexican football, and plays its home matches at Estadio El Encanto. Founded in 2003 in Culiacán debuting in the Primera División A, and moved to Mazatlán in 2026.

The club participated for six tournaments in the Primera División/Liga MX. Dorados' debut in top-level league was in the Apertura 2004 tournament, and last participating in 2016. In domestic competitions, Dorados won one Copa MX in 2012. Throughout its history, the club has been relegated from Liga MX twice, most recently in the Clausura 2016 tournament.

== History ==
=== First promotion and relegation ===
Dorados de Sinaloa was founded on 8 August 2003 in Culiacán, Sinaloa, in the Primera División 'A' de México, the second level division of the Mexican football league system. On 20 December, they won their first title in the Apertura 2003 tournament, with Guadalupe Castañeda scoring the decisive goal against Cobras de Ciudad Juárez in the final. In the following tournament, Dorados finished as runners-up.

On 29 May 2004, Dorados secured promotion to the Primera División de México after defeating León in the Campeón de Ascenso. Remarkably, the club achieved top-flight status just one year after its founding. In an effort to remain in the top division level, Dorados made several high-profile signings, including Sebastián Abreu, Pep Guardiola and Jared Borgetti. However, after two years in the Primera División, Dorados was relegated following the Clausura 2006 tournament.

Dorados claimed the title in the Clausura 2007 tournament, which allowed them to participate in the promotion play-off, but ultimately fell to Puebla. In October 2012, Dorados emerged as the Copa MX champion following their victory over Correcaminos in the final.

In May 2013, Grupo Caliente, known for its casino operations, acquired a majority ownership in the club.

=== Return to Primera División and Relegation ===
On 23 May 2015, Dorados once again secured promotion to Mexico's top flight after defeating Necaxa in the promotion play-off. However, just a year later, they were relegated to the Liga de Ascenso de México after finishing at the bottom of the relegation table.

Dorados secured the Apertura 2016 title, earning a spot in the promotion play-off, but were ultimately defeated by Lobos BUAP.

In September 2018, Diego Maradona was appointed head coach of Dorados. He made his debut on 17 September with a 4–1 victory over Cafetaleros de Tapachula. Maradona guided Dorados to two consecutive finals, though they fell short in both, losing to Atlético San Luis. In June 2019, Maradona's lawyer announced that he would be stepping down from the role, citing health reasons.

=== Liga de Expansión MX ===
In the spring of 2020, the Ascenso MX was restructured into the Liga de Expansión MX, a competition designed to foster the development of young footballers. Following this change, Dorados began functioning as a reserve team for both Tijuana and Querétaro, as all three clubs were owned by the same group.

In September 2024, the team was temporarily relocated to Tijuana, Baja California, due to concerns about public safety in Sinaloa, although it provisionally kept its original name. In July 2026, Dorados returned to Sinaloa; however, the team was relocated to Mazatlán instead of Culiacán, making Estadio El Encanto their new home.

== Rivalry ==
When the Dorados de Sinaloa arrived at the Primera División 'A' de México in 2003, a rivalry was born. When the franchise was first created in 2003, Dorados became champions in their first tournament, becoming the first team to ever accomplish this feat in the Primera División 'A'. In their second tournament, Dorados made it to the final once again, falling to León. Despite losing this final, Dorados and León played the promotion game to the Primera División de México where Dorados were victorious. Dorados and León have played a total of four finals, with each team winning two.

Since the relegation of Dorados to the Ascenso MX in 2016, the two sides have not played in a league match.

== Honours ==
Domestic
Type	Competition	Titles	Seasons	Runners-up
Top level FMF	Copa MX	1	Ape–2012	—
Lower levels FMF	Ascenso MX	4^{s}	Ape–2003, Cla–2007, Cla–2015, Ape–2016	Cla–2004, Ape–2007, Cla–2008, Ape–2012, Ape–2018, Cla–2019
Lower levels FMF	Campeón de Ascenso	2^{s}	2004, 2015	2007, 2017

Notes

- record
- ^{s} shared record

== Personnel ==
=== Management ===
Position	Staff
President	(Mexico) José Antonio Núñez
Director of football	(Mexico) Juan Pablo Santiago

=== Coaching staff ===
Position	Staff
Manager	(Mexico) Luis Orozco
Assistant managers	(Mexico) Bruno Flores (Mexico) Miguel Pulido
Fitness coach	(Mexico) Guillermo Arteaga
Physiotherapist	(Mexico) Héctor Tapia
Team doctor	(Mexico) Hernando Casillas

== Players ==
=== First-team squad ===
As of 14 August 2026

Note: Flags indicate national team as defined under FIFA eligibility rules; some limited exceptions apply. Players may hold more than one non-FIFA nationality.

No.	Pos.	Nation	Player
2	DF	MEX	Sebastián Yáñez (on loan from Tijuana)
3	DF	MEX	Diego García
4	DF	MEX	Ramiro Franco
5	DF	MEX	Abraham Flores (on loan from Tijuana)
6	MF	MEX	Dylan Guajardo
7	MF	MEX	Jaime Álvarez (on loan from Tijuana)
8	MF	MEX	Carlos Galicia (on loan from Tijuana)
9	FW	COL	Jhan Rengifo
10	FW	MEX	Leonardo Vargas (on loan from Tijuana)
11	MF	MEX	Francisco Contreras
12	MF	MEX	Arath Egaña (on loan from Tijuana)
13	MF	MEX	Germán Padilla
14	MF	MEX	Martín Sol (on loan from Querétaro)
15	MF	MEX	Christian Leyva (on loan from Tijuana)
17	MF	MEX	Fernando González
18	DF	MEX	Sebastián Cervantes (on loan from Tijuana)

No.	Pos.	Nation	Player
20	DF	MEX	David Osuna (on loan from Tijuana)
21	GK	MEX	José Castro (on loan from Tijuana)
22	DF	COL	Willian González
23	FW	MEX	Benjamín Sánchez
24	MF	ECU	Michael Ponce
25	DF	MEX	Emiliano Velazco (on loan from Tijuana)
26	DF	MEX	Edson Gutiérrez
27	MF	MEX	Marcos Flores (on loan from Tijuana)
28	MF	MEX	Brandon Ordorica (on loan from Tijuana)
29	FW	PAR	Óscar Coronel
30	GK	MEX	Jonathan Vaal (on loan from Tijuana)
32	DF	MEX	Christopher Castro
33	GK	MEX	Irwin Zamudio (on loan from Tijuana)
34	GK	MEX	Ismael Flores (on loan from Tijuana)
35	FW	ECU	Jakson Porozo

== Notable players ==
- (Argentina) Carlos Casartelli
- (Argentina) César Gradito
- (Argentina) Diego Latorre
- (Argentina) Pablo Gabriel Torres
- (Argentina) Milton Caraglio
- (Argentina) Gaspar Servio
- (Argentina) Gabriel Hachen
- (Brazil) Flavio Rogerio
- (Brazil) Iarley
- (Brazil) Lucas Silva
- (Chile) David Henriquez
- (Colombia) Andrés Orozco
- (Colombia) Yimmi Chara
- (Costa Rica) Óscar Rojas
- (Ecuador) Jefferson Montero
- (Ecuador) Vinicio Angulo
- (Ecuador) Segundo Castillo
- (Ecuador) Walter Ayovi
- (Mexico) Miguel Becerra
- (Mexico) Everaldo Begines
- (Mexico) Jared Borgetti
- (Mexico) Omar Briceño
- (Mexico) Guadalupe Castañeda
- (Mexico) Jorge Iván Estrada
- (Mexico) Hugo García
- (Mexico) Carlos Alberto Hurtado
- (Mexico) Héctor López
- (Mexico) David Mendoza
- (Mexico) Aurelio Molina
- (Mexico) Luis Padilla
- (Mexico) Mario Padilla
- (Mexico) Christian Patiño
- (Mexico) Carlos Pinto
- (Mexico) Aldo Polo
- (Mexico) Sergio Quiróz
- (Mexico) Lorenzo Ramírez
- (Mexico) Jaime Ruiz
- (Mexico) Diego Mejia
- (Mexico) Alfredo Frausto
- (Mexico) Mario Osuna
- (Mexico) Javier Güemez
- (Mexico) Joel Sánchez
- (Mexico) Cirilo Saucedo
- (Mexico) Christian Valdéz
- (Mexico) Cuauhtémoc Blanco
- (Mexico) Fernando Arce
- (Mexico) Elio Castro
- (Mexico) Raúl Enríquez
- (Mexico) Moisés Velasco
- (Panama) Roberto Nurse
- (Spain) Pep Guardiola
- (United States) Joe Corona
- (Uruguay) Sebastián Abreu
- (Uruguay) Héctor Giménez
- (Uruguay) Nelson Maz
- (Uruguay) Jonathan Lacerda

== Managers ==
- (Mexico) Juan Carlos Chávez (2003–2004)
- (Costa Rica) Alexandre Guimarães (2004)
- (Mexico) José Luis Real (2004–2005)
- (Mexico) Carlos Bracamontes (2005)
- (Spain) Juanma Lillo (2005–2006)
- (Mexico) Jose Luis Saldivar (2006)
- (Mexico) Jacques Passy (2006)
- (Uruguay) Hugo Fernández (2006–2008)
- (Argentina) Jorge Almiron (2008–2009)
- (Mexico) Ricardo Rayas (2009–2011)
- (Mexico) Francisco Palacios (Interim) (2011)
- (Uruguay) Robert Dante Siboldi (2012)
- (Mexico) Francisco Ramirez (2012–2014)
- (Mexico) Diego Torres (2014)
- (Mexico) Eduardo Fentanes (Interim) (2014)
- (Argentina) Carlos Bustos (2015)
- (Mexico) Omar Briceño (Interim) (2015)
- (Colombia) Luis Fernando Suarez (2015–2016)
- (Mexico) José Guadalupe Cruz (2016)
- (Mexico) Gabriel Caballero (2016–2017)
- (Mexico) Diego Ramirez (2017–2018)
- (Mexico) Francisco Ramírez (2018)
- (Argentina) Diego Maradona (2018–2019)
- (Mexico) José Guadalupe Cruz (2019)
- (Mexico) David Patiño (2020)
- (Mexico) Rafael García (2021–2024)
- (Uruguay) Sebastián Abreu (2024–2025)
- (Mexico) Cirilo Saucedo (2025)
- (Mexico) Francisco Ramírez (2026)

== Reserves ==
=== Dorados de Los Mochis ===
The team participated in the Segunda División, finishing as runners-up in the Clausura 2009, losing to Universidad del Fútbol y Ciencias del Deporte 5–2 on aggregate.

=== Dorados B/Dorados Premier ===
The team participated in the Serie B of the Liga Premier, Dorados Premier changed its name to Dorados B, after Dorados de Sinaloa was relegated from the Liga MX to Ascenso MX in 2016.

=== Dorados C/Dorados TDP ===
The team competes in the Liga TDP, winning the Torneo de Filiales de la Liga TDP in the 2020–21 season, defeating Cimarrones B 1–0 on aggregate.
