= 2008–09 Primera División A season =

Season of a Mexican football league

Primera División A
- Season: 2008–09
- Champions: Apertura: Querétaro; Clausura: Mérida
- Promoted: Querétaro
- Relegated: Tapachula

The format for the 2008–09 season changed from 2 groups of 12 to 3 groups of 9 teams. This gave the opportunity and the number increased from 24 to 27, many teams served as reserve teams from teams in D1.

== Changes for the 2008–09 season ==
- Coatzacoalcos moved to Orizaba and was rebranded Orizaba after Apertura 2008
- Veracruz were demoted from Primera División
- Indios were promoted to Mexican Primera Division
- Irapuato won promotion to Primera División A when Pachuca Jr. did not meet the qualifications for promotion.

Added teams

- Atlante Chetumal
- Mérida FC
- Chihuahua
- Club Tapatio From Morelia B

== Stadia and locations ==
Club	Stadium	Capacity	City
Académicos	Jalisco; Alfredo Pistache Torres	63,000; 3,000	Guadalajara
Atlético Mexiquense	Nemesio Díez	25,000	Toluca
TR Coatzacoalcos	Rafael Hérnandez Ochoa	4,800	Coatzacoalcos
Correcaminos	Marte R. Gómez	19,000	Ciudad Victoria
Cruz Azul Hidalgo	10 de Diciembre	17,000	Ciudad Cooperativa Cruz Azul
Dorados de Sinaloa	Banorte	19,000	Culiacán
Durango	Francisco Zarco	15,000	Durango City
Indios de Chihuahua	Olímpico Universitario José Reyes Baeza	22,000	Chihuahua City
Irapuato	Sergio León Chávez	26,000	Irapuato
Jaguares 'A'	Víctor Manuel Reyna	17,000	Tuxtla Gutiérrez, Chiapas
León	León	35,000	León
Lobos BUAP	Cuauhtémoc	42,600	Puebla City
Mérida	Carlos Iturralde	18,000	Mérida
Potros Chetumal	José López Portillo	10,000	Chetumal
Pumas Morelos	Centenario	14,800	Cuernavaca
Querétaro	Corregidora	33,000	Querétaro City
Rayados 'A'	El Barrial	1,000	Santiago
Real Colima	Colima	12,000	Colima City
Salamanca	Olímpico Sección 24	10,000	Salamanca
Santos Laguna 'A'	Corona	19,000	Torreón
Socio Águila	Azteca	114,600	Mexico City
Tampico Madero	Tamaulipas	20,000	Tampico and Ciudad Madero
Tapatío	Jalisco	63,000	Guadalajara
Tecos 'A'	Tres de Marzo	25,000	Zapopan
Tigres "B"	Universitario	42,000	San Nicolás de los Garza
Tijuana	Caliente	22,000	Tijuana
TR Veracruz	Luis "Pirata" Fuente	30,000	Boca del Río

== Apertura 2008 ==
Primera Division A
- Season: Apertura 2008
- Champions: Querétaro

The Primera División A Apertura 2008 is a Mexican football tournament, one of two short tournaments held each year. It began on July 18, 2008, and ran until December 7, 2008. The reigning champions, León, were eliminated in the quarterfinals by Irapuato on a 2–1 two-leg aggregate, and thus could not successfully defend their Clausura 2008 title. Querétaro won the tournament, defeating Irapuato on a 2–0 two-leg aggregate, and will earn a spot into the promotional playoff held after the end of the Clausura 2009 season, where the winners of the two tournaments meet in an effort to gain promotion to the Primera División.

After winning the 2008 promotional playoff against León, the Indios were promoted to the Primera División. Veracruz were relegated to the Primera División A due to finishing at the bottom of the Primera División relegation table. Pachuca Juniors won the right to be promoted to the Primera División A after winning the Segunda División promotional playoff but lacked the certificate of promotion given to teams by the Federación Mexicana de Fútbol Asociación. Instead, Irapuato were promoted to the Primera División A, and two new reserve teams were created for the Indios of Ciudad Juárez (Chihuahua) and Atlante (Chetumal).

=== Tournament format ===
A total of 27 teams are divided into three groups of nine teams each. Each team plays the other eight teams in its group twice, once at home and once away, for a total of 16 games. At the end of the regular season the top two teams in each group, as well as the next two highest placed teams, qualify to the Liguilla. The teams are seeded based on their position in the general table and are arranged before each round so that the highest seeded team remaining always plays the lowest seed remaining. The teams play a home and home series and whichever team has the better aggregate score advances. If the two teams are tied after both legs in the quarterfinals and semifinals the higher seed advances automatically. In the finals, if the two teams are tied after both legs two 15 minute halves of extra time are added. If the teams are still tied after extra time the champion is determined through a penalty shootout.

==== Promotion ====
One team is promoted to the Primera División each year (two short tournaments). After the Clausura 2009 tournament, the champions of the Apertura 2008 and Clausura 2009 tournaments will play a home and home series to determine which team will be promoted. If the same team wins both tournaments it will be promoted automatically. In order for a team to be promoted it has to obtain a certification from the Federación Mexicana de Fútbol Asociación. If the winner of the promotional final is not certified for promotion a home and home series is played between the highest placed certified team and the club being relegated to the Primera División A to determine which will be in the Primera División.

Currently certified teams

- Atlético Mexiquense
- Lobos BUAP
- Cruz Azul Hidalgo
- Durango
- Irapuato
- Mérida
- León
- Querétaro
- Santos Laguna A
- Dorados de Sinaloa
- Tijuana
- Correcaminos
- Veracruz

==== Relegation ====
One team is relegated to the Segunda División each year (two short tournaments). The team that has the worst points to games played ratio over the previous three years (Apertura 2006, Clausura 2007, Apertura 2007, Clausura 2008, Apertura 2008, Clausura 2009) is relegated to the Segunda División.

=== Group league tables ===
==== Group 1 ====
Pos	Team	Pld	W	D	L	GF	GA	GD	Pts	Qualification
1	León	16	10	5	1	21	12	+9	35	Qualifies for the Liguilla and is certified for promotion
2	Tijuana	16	9	5	2	20	8	+12	32	Qualifies for the Liguilla and is certified for promotion
3	Irapuato	16	8	6	2	20	6	+14	30	Qualifies for the Liguilla and is certified for promotion
4	Tapatío	16	5	4	7	12	16	−4	19	
5	Tecos A	16	4	5	7	17	16	+1	17	
6	Académicos	16	3	7	6	12	14	−2	16	
7	Real Colima	16	3	6	7	10	18	−8	15	
8	Dorados de Sinaloa	16	4	3	9	11	21	−10	15	Certified for promotion
9	Salamanca	16	2	7	7	10	22	−12	13	

Source: FMF
Rules for classification: 1st points; 2nd goal difference; 3rd goals scored; 4th head-to-head; 5th away goals scored; 6th draw

==== Group 2 ====
Pos	Team	Pld	W	D	L	GF	GA	GD	Pts	Qualification
1	Querétaro	16	10	3	3	36	20	+16	33	Qualifies for the Liguilla and is certified for promotion
2	Correcaminos	16	9	4	3	21	12	+9	31	Qualifies for the Liguilla and is certified for promotion
3	Tigres B	16	9	2	5	19	12	+7	29	Qualifies for the Liguilla
4	Chihuahua	16	6	3	7	25	28	−3	21	
5	Durango	16	4	8	4	15	16	−1	20	Certified for promotion
6	Socio Águila	16	5	4	7	13	16	−3	19	
7	Tampico Madero	16	4	5	7	25	30	−5	17	
8	Santos Laguna A	16	4	3	9	18	27	−9	15	Certified for promotion
9	Monterrey A	16	2	6	8	19	30	−11	12	

Source: FMF
Rules for classification: 1st points; 2nd goal difference; 3rd goals scored; 4th head-to-head; 5th away goals scored; 6th draw

==== Group 3 ====
Pos	Team	Pld	W	D	L	GF	GA	GD	Pts	Qualification
1	Pumas Morelos	16	11	2	3	27	12	+15	35	Qualifies for the Liguilla
2	Mérida	16	10	2	4	22	13	+9	32	Qualifies for the Liguilla and is certified for promotion
3	Veracruz	16	8	4	4	25	16	+9	28	Certified for promotion
4	Cruz Azul Hidalgo	16	7	3	6	25	15	+10	24	Certified for promotion
5	Lobos BUAP	16	6	3	7	22	30	−8	21	Certified for promotion
6	Atlético Mexiquense	16	5	4	7	19	19	0	19	Certified for promotion
7	TR Coatzacoalcos	16	4	7	5	14	16	−2	19	
8	Chetumal	16	1	8	7	15	28	−13	11	Last on the relegation table
9	Tapachula	16	1	5	10	12	32	−20	8	

Source: FMF
Rules for classification: 1st points; 2nd goal difference; 3rd goals scored; 4th head-to-head; 5th away goals scored; 6th draw

=== General league table ===
Pos	Team	Pld	W	D	L	GF	GA	GD	Pts	Qualification
1	Pumas Morelos	16	11	2	3	27	12	+15	35	Qualifies for the Liguilla
2	León	16	10	5	1	21	12	+9	35	Qualifies for the Liguilla and is certified for promotion
3	Querétaro	16	10	3	3	36	20	+16	33	Qualifies for the Liguilla and is certified for promotion
4	Tijuana	16	9	5	2	20	8	+12	32	Qualifies for the Liguilla and is certified for promotion
5	Mérida	16	10	2	4	22	13	+9	32	Qualifies for the Liguilla and is certified for promotion
6	Correcaminos	16	9	4	3	21	12	+9	31	Qualifies for the Liguilla and is certified for promotion
7	Irapuato	16	8	6	2	20	6	+14	30	Qualifies for the Liguilla and is certified for promotion
8	Tigres B	16	9	2	5	19	12	+7	29	Qualifies for the Liguilla
9	Veracruz	16	8	4	4	25	16	+9	28	Certified for promotion
10	Cruz Azul Hidalgo	16	7	3	6	25	15	+10	24	Certified for promotion
11	Chihuahua	16	6	3	7	25	28	−3	21	
12	Lobos BUAP	16	6	3	7	22	30	−8	21	Certified for promotion
13	Durango	16	4	8	4	15	16	−1	20	Certified for promotion
14	Atlético Mexiquense	16	5	4	7	19	19	0	19	Certified for promotion
15	Coatzacoalcos	16	4	7	5	14	16	−2	19	
16	Socio Águila	16	5	4	7	13	16	−3	19	
17	Tapatío	16	5	4	7	12	16	−4	19	
18	Tecos A	16	4	5	7	17	16	+1	17	
19	Tampico Madero	16	4	5	7	25	30	−5	17	
20	Académicos	16	3	7	6	12	14	−2	16	
21	Real Colima	16	3	6	7	10	18	−8	15	
22	Santos Laguna A	16	4	3	9	18	27	−9	15	Certified for promotion
23	Sinaloa	16	4	3	9	11	21	−10	15	Certified for promotion
24	Salamanca	16	2	7	7	10	22	−12	13	
25	Monterrey A	16	2	6	8	19	30	−11	12	
26	Chetumal	16	1	8	7	15	28	−13	11	Last on the relegation table
27	Tapachula	16	1	5	10	12	32	−20	8	

Source: FMF
Rules for classification: 1st points; 2nd goal difference; 3rd goals scored; 4th head-to-head; 5th away goals scored; 6th draw

=== Liguilla ===
Quarterfinals
1	Pumas Morelos (s.)	2	0	2
8	Tigres B	1	1	2
5	Tijuana	0	4	4
4	Mérida	1	0	1
3	Querétaro (s.)	1	1	2
6	Correcaminos	2	0	2
7	León	0	1	1
2	Irapuato	1	1	2

Semifinals
1	Pumas Morelos	0	0	0
7	Irapuato	1	1	2
4	Tijuana	1	1	2
3	Querétaro	0	3	3

Finals
7	Irapuato	0	0	0
3	Querétaro	0	2	2

==== Quarter-finals ====
Team 1	Agg.	Team 2	1st leg	2nd leg
Querétaro (s.)	2–2	Correcaminos	1–2	1–0
Tijuana	4–1	Mérida	0–1	4–0
Pumas Morelos (s.)	2–2	Tigres B	2–1	0–1
León	1–2	Irapuato	0–1	1–1

===== First leg =====
19 November 2008	Tigres B	1–2	Pumas Morelos	San Nicolás de los Garza
20:30	Viniegra 40'	Report	Rojas 80'; Herrera 89'	Stadium: Estadio Universitario; Attendance: 600; Referee: Miguel Ángel Chacón Viveros

19 November 2008	Irapuato	1–0	León	Irapuato
21:00	Pérez 34'	Report		Stadium: Estadio Sergio León Chávez; Attendance: 20,000; Referee: Mario Alonso Villa García

20 November 2008	Mérida	1–0	Tijuana	Mérida
15:00	Sainz 43'	Report		Stadium: Estadio Carlos Iturralde; Attendance: 6,000; Referee: Miguel Ángel Ayala Ramírez

20 November 2008	Correcaminos	2–1	Querétaro	Ciudad Victoria
20:30	Cano 1' (own); Vela 14'	Report	Tridente 44'	Stadium: Estadio Marte R. Gómez; Attendance: 18,000; Referee: Gerardo García Acevedo

===== Second leg =====
22 November 2008	Pumas Morelos	0–1 (2–2 agg.)	Tigres B	Cuernavaca
15:00		Report	Mendoza 1'	Stadium: Estadio Centenario; Attendance: 3,000; Referee: Miguel Ángel Ortega Rojas

22 November 2008	León	1–1 (1–2 agg.)	Irapuato	León
20:00	Reyes 69'	Report	Marique 75'	Stadium: Estadio León; Attendance: 22,000; Referee: Jesús Fabricio Morales Bojorquez

23 November 2008	Tijuana	4–0 (4–1 agg.)	Mérida	Tijuana
13:00	Enríquez 7', 58'; Abrego 43'; Caetano 65'	Report		Stadium: Estadio Caliente; Attendance: 13,333; Referee: Juan Genaro Medrano Ávalos

23 November 2008	Querétaro	1–0 (2–2 agg.)	Correcaminos	Querétaro City
19:00	Romo 73'	Report		Stadium: Estadio Corregidora; Attendance: 30,000; Referee: Jorge Macías Romo

==== Semi-finals ====
Team 1	Agg.	Team 2	1st leg	2nd leg
Querétaro	3–2	Tijuana	0–1	3–1
Pumas Morelos	0–2	Irapuato	0–1	0–1

===== First leg =====
26 November 2008	Irapuato	1–0	Pumas Morelos	Irapuato
21:00	Casanova 39'	Report		Stadium: Estadio Sergio León Chávez; Attendance: 24,000; Referee: Jorge Macías Romo

27 November 2008	Tijuana	1–0	Querétaro	Tijuana
14:00	Torres 14'	Report		Stadium: Estadio Caliente; Attendance: 13,000; Referee: Julio David Escobar Barba

===== Second leg =====
29 November 2008	Pumas Morelos	0–1 (0–2 agg.)	Irapuato	Cuernavaca
15:00		Report	Pérez 32'	Stadium: Estadio Centenario; Attendance: 7,000; Referee: Jaime Herrera Garduño

30 November 2008	Querétaro	3–1 (3–2 agg.)	Tijuana	Querétaro City
19:00	Tridente 25', 84'; Gerk 50'	Report	Torres 57'	Stadium: Estadio Corregidora; Attendance: 34,130; Referee: Román Rafael Medina Vázquez

==== Final ====
Team 1	Agg.	Team 2	1st leg	2nd leg
Querétaro	2–0	Irapuato	0–0	2–0

===== First leg =====
4 December 2008	Irapuato	0–0	Querétaro	Irapuato
21:00		Report		Stadium: Estadio Sergio León Chávez; Attendance: 24,000; Referee: Paul Enrique Delgadillo Haro

===== Second leg =====
7 December 2008	Querétaro	2–0 (2–0 agg.)	Irapuato	Querétaro City
19:00	López 8'; Gomes 70'	Report		Stadium: Estadio Corregidora; Attendance: 34,130; Referee: Marco Antonio Rodríguez

Apertura 2008 winner

3rd title

=== Results ===
==== Group 1 ====
Home \ Away	ACA	IRA	LEÓ	REA	SAL	SIN	TAP	TIJ	UAG
Académicos		0–0	0–1	1–1	3–0	2–1	0–1	1–1	0–0
Irapuato	2–0		0–1	2–0	1–1	2–0	1–0	0–0	3–1
León	2–1	0–4		2–0	0–0	1–0	1–0	1–1	2–1
Real Colima	0–0	0–0	1–1		2–0	0–1	0–2	1–0	1–3
Salamanca	2–1	0–1	0–0	1–1		0–0	1–0	0–2	0–0
Sinaloa	1–2	0–0	0–1	1–2	3–2		0–0	1–2	0–3
Tapatío	0–0	1–3	1–3	1–1	4–2	0–1		0–3	1–0
Tijuana	1–0	1–0	2–2	2–0	3–0	0–2	0–0		1–0
UAG	1–1	1–1	1–3	1–0	1–1	4–0	0–1	0–1	

Legend: Blue = home team win; Yellow = draw; Red = away team win.

==== Group 2 ====
Home \ Away	CHI	DUR	MON	QUE	SLA	SOC	TAM	UAT	UNL
Chihuahua		0–1	3–1	2–4	2–0	1–0	5–4	0–0	0–1
Durango	0–2		2–2	1–3	2–2	0–0	1–1	1–0	0–0
Monterrey	1–1	1–1		5–4	2–2	0–0	2–4	0–0	1–2
Querétaro	3–1	1–0	2–0		3–0	0–1	5–1	1–0	2–1
Santos Laguna	4–3	0–0	1–0	1–3		1–2	4–1	1–2	0–2
Socio Águila	0–1	1–4	1–0	2–2	2–0		1–1	0–1	1–0
Tampico Madero	3–3	0–0	2–3	2–0	2–0	2–1		1–1	0–1
UAT	2–0	2–0	3–1	3–3	0–2	1–0	2–1		1–0
UANL	4–1	1–2	2–0	0–0	1–0	2–1	1–0	1–3	

Legend: Blue = home team win; Yellow = draw; Red = away team win.

==== Group 3 ====
Home \ Away	ATM	BUP	COA	CHE	CRU	MER	TAP	VER	UNM
Atlético Mexiquense		2–0	1–1	4–0	1–0	2–1	2–1	0–1	0–3
BUAP	3–2		2–1	2–1	0–0	1–0	3–0	2–1	2–3
Coatzacoalcos	1–1	3–0		1–1	1–0	1–0	1–0	0–0	1–3
Chetumal	0–0	2–2	1–1		3–2	0–3	0–0	1–1	1–2
Cruz Azul	1–0	1–0	0–0	4–2		1–2	4–0	4–0	2–0
Mérida	2–1	1–0	2–1	1–1	2–1		2–0	1–0	1–0
Tapachula	2–2	4–4	0–0	2–2	1–3	0–1		0–2	2–1
Veracruz	2–1	6–1	3–1	1–0	2–1	2–2	3–0		0–0
UNAM	1–0	3–0	2–0	2–0	1–1	2–1	2–0	2–1	

Updated to match(es) played on 2008-11-17. Source: FMF
Legend: Blue = home team win; Yellow = draw; Red = away team win.

=== Top scorers ===
Scorer	Goals	Team
(Mexico) Mauro Gerk	14	Querétaro
(Mexico) Raúl Enríquez	14	Tijuana
(Uruguay) Bosco Frontan	10	Tampico Madero
(Mexico) José Gutiérrez	9	Chihuahua
(Mexico) Javier Orozco	8	Cruz Azul Hidalgo
(Uruguay) Nicolás Olivera	8	Veracruz
(Uruguay) Dany González	8	Monterrey A
(Argentina) Diego Olsina	7	Mérida
(Chile) Juan Úbeda	7	Lobos BUAP
(Mexico) Marco Reyna	6	Durango
(Mexico) José Ojeda	6	Tampico Madero
(Mexico) Luis Orozco	6	Mérida
(Chile) Sebastián González	6	León
(Mexico) Sergio Pérez	5	Irapuato
(Mexico) Carlos Vela	5	Correcaminos

Last updated: 2008-11-17.
Source: FMF

=== Relegation table ===
Pos.	Team	Pts	G	Ave.
1	Tijuana	32	16	2.0000
2	León	166	84	1.9762
3	Irapuato	30	16	1.8750
4	Veracruz	28	16	1.7500
5	Cruz Azul Hidalgo	144	84	1.7143
6	Dorados de Sinaloa	144	84	1.7143
7	Querétaro	140	84	1.6667
8	Correcaminos	131	84	1.5595
9	Pumas Morelos	126	84	1.5000
10	Coatzacoalcos	126	84	1.5000
11	Lobos BUAP	116	84	1.3810
12	Salamanca	114	84	1.3571
13	Mérida	67	50	1.3400
14	Chihuahua	21	16	1.3125
15	Tigres B	110	84	1.3095
16	Durango	109	84	1.2976
17	Real Colima	106	84	1.2619
18	Tampico Madero	103	84	1.2262
19	Tapatío	102	84	1.2143
20	Atlético Mexiquense	98	84	1.1667
21	Monterrey A	96	84	1.1429
22	Socio Águila	93	84	1.1071
23	Académicos	91	84	1.0833
24	Tecos A	90	84	1.0714
25	Santos Laguna A	81	84	0.9643
26	Tapachula	36	50	0.7200
27	Chetumal	11	16	0.6875

Last updated: 2008-11-17.
Source: FMF

== Clausura 2009 ==
Ascenso MX
- Season: Clausura 2009
- Champions: Mérida

The Primera División A Clausura 2009 is a Mexican football tournament, the second of two short tournaments held during the 2008–2009 Mexican football season. It began on January 10, 2009, and will run until May 23 or May 24, 2009. The winner of the tournament will earn a place in the promotional playoff against Querétaro, the winners of the Apertura 2008 tournament, to determine which team will be promoted to the Primera División.

=== Tournament format ===
A total of 27 teams are divided into three groups of nine teams each. Each team plays the other eight teams in its group twice, once at home and once away, for a total of 16 games. At the end of the regular season the top two teams in each group, as well as the next two highest placed teams, qualify to the Liguilla (playoffs). The teams are seeded based on their position in the general table and are arranged before each round so that the highest seeded team remaining always plays the lowest seed remaining. The teams play a home and away series and whichever team has the better aggregate score advances. If the two teams are tied after both legs in the quarterfinals and semifinals the higher seed advances automatically. In the finals, if the two teams are tied after both legs two 15 minute halves of extra time are added. If the teams are still tied after extra time the champion is determined through a penalty shootout.

==== Promotion ====
One team is promoted to the Primera División each year (two short tournaments). After the Clausura 2009 tournament, the champions of the Apertura 2008 and Clausura 2009 tournaments will play a home and home series to determine which team will be promoted. If the same team wins both tournaments it will be promoted automatically. In order for a team to be promoted it has to obtain a certification from the Federación Mexicana de Fútbol Asociación. If the winner of the promotional final is not certified for promotion a home and away series is played between the highest placed certified team and the club being relegated to the Primera División A to determine which will be in the Primera División.

Currently certified teams

- Atlético Mexiquense
- Lobos BUAP
- Cruz Azul Hidalgo
- Durango
- Irapuato
- Mérida
- León
- Querétaro
- Santos Laguna A
- Dorados de Sinaloa
- Tijuana
- Correcaminos
- Veracruz

==== Relegation ====
One team is relegated to the Segunda División each year (two short tournaments). The team that has the worst points to games played ratio over the previous three years (Apertura 2006, Clausura 2007, Apertura 2007, Clausura 2008, Apertura 2008, Clausura 2009) is relegated to the Segunda División.

=== Group league tables ===
==== Group 1 ====
Pos	Team	Pld	W	D	L	GF	GA	GD	Pts	Qualification
1	Mérida	16	9	3	4	25	13	+12	30	Qualifies for the Liguilla and is certified for promotion
2	Socio Águila	16	8	3	5	21	18	+3	27	Qualifies for the Liguilla
3	Salamanca	16	7	5	4	22	20	+2	26	Qualifies for the Liguilla
4	Chetumal	16	5	6	5	23	20	+3	21	
5	Querétaro	16	6	2	8	28	25	+3	20	Certified for promotion
6	Irapuato	16	5	5	6	17	23	−6	20	Certified for promotion
7	Chihuahua	16	5	5	6	19	26	−7	20	
8	Santos Laguna A	16	5	3	8	17	20	−3	18	Certified for promotion
9	Real Colima	16	3	6	7	16	23	−7	15	

Source: FMF
Rules for classification: 1st points; 2nd goal difference; 3rd goals scored; 4th head-to-head; 5th away goals scored; 6th draw

==== Group 2 ====
Pos	Team	Pld	W	D	L	GF	GA	GD	Pts	Qualification
1	Dorados de Sinaloa	16	8	7	1	30	15	+15	31	Qualifies for the Liguilla and is certified for promotion
2	Veracruz	16	8	6	2	27	14	+13	30	Qualifies for the Liguilla and is certified for promotion
3	Pumas Morelos	16	6	6	4	26	15	+11	24	
4	León	16	6	5	5	21	19	+2	23	Certified for promotion
5	Correcaminos	16	4	8	4	17	18	−1	20	Certified for promotion
6	Tigres B	16	4	6	6	14	23	−9	18	
7	Atlético Mexiquense	16	4	4	8	12	23	−11	16	Certified for promotion
8	Tampico Madero	16	3	6	7	18	28	−10	15	
9	Tapatío	16	2	6	8	16	26	−10	12	

Source: FMF
Rules for classification: 1st points; 2nd goal difference; 3rd goals scored; 4th head-to-head; 5th away goals scored; 6th draw

==== Group 3 ====
Pos	Team	Pld	W	D	L	GF	GA	GD	Pts	Qualification
1	Tijuana	16	9	6	1	28	16	+12	33	Qualifies for the Liguilla and is certified for promotion
2	Cruz Azul Hidalgo	16	7	6	3	23	16	+7	27	Qualifies for the Liguilla and is certified for promotion
3	Lobos BUAP	16	6	7	3	25	17	+8	25	Qualifies for the Liguilla and is certified for promotion
4	Durango	16	5	10	1	24	16	+8	25	Certified for promotion
5	Orizaba	16	5	5	6	15	16	−1	20	
6	Monterrey A	16	5	5	6	16	18	−2	20	
7	Tapachula	16	3	7	6	18	21	−3	16	Last on the relegation table
8	Académicos	16	1	8	7	15	27	−12	11	
9	Tecos A	16	1	6	9	8	25	−17	9	

Source: FMF
Rules for classification: 1st points; 2nd goal difference; 3rd goals scored; 4th head-to-head; 5th away goals scored; 6th draw

=== General league table ===
Pos	Team	Pld	W	D	L	GF	GA	GD	Pts	Qualification
1	Tijuana	16	9	6	1	28	16	+12	33	Qualifies for the Liguilla and is certified for promotion
2	Dorados de Sinaloa	16	8	7	1	30	15	+15	31	Qualifies for the Liguilla and is certified for promotion
3	Veracruz	16	8	6	2	27	14	+13	30	Qualifies for the Liguilla and is certified for promotion
4	Mérida	16	9	3	4	25	13	+12	30	Qualifies for the Liguilla and is certified for promotion
5	Cruz Azul Hidalgo	16	7	6	3	23	16	+7	27	Qualifies for the Liguilla and is certified for promotion
6	Socio Águila	16	8	3	5	21	18	+3	27	Qualifies for the Liguilla
7	Salamanca	16	7	5	4	22	20	+2	26	Qualifies for the Liguilla
8	Lobos BUAP	16	6	7	3	25	17	+8	25	Qualifies for the Liguilla and is certified for promotion
9	Durango	16	5	10	1	24	16	+8	25	Certified for promotion
10	Pumas Morelos	16	6	6	4	26	15	+11	24	
11	León	16	6	5	5	21	19	+2	23	Certified for promotion
12	Chetumal	16	5	6	5	23	20	+3	21	
13	Querétaro	16	6	2	8	28	25	+3	20	Certified for promotion
14	Correcaminos	16	4	8	4	17	18	−1	20	Certified for promotion
15	Orizaba	16	5	5	6	15	16	−1	20	
16	Monterrey A	16	5	5	6	16	18	−2	20	
17	Irapuato	16	5	5	6	17	23	−6	20	Certified for promotion
18	Chihuahua	16	5	5	6	19	26	−7	20	
19	Santos Laguna A	16	5	3	8	17	20	−3	18	Certified for promotion
20	Tigres B	16	4	6	6	14	23	−9	18	
21	Tapachula	16	3	7	6	18	21	−3	16	Last on the relegation table
22	Atlético Mexiquense	16	4	4	8	12	23	−11	16	Certified for promotion
23	Real Colima	16	3	6	7	16	23	−7	15	
24	Tampico Madero	16	3	6	7	18	28	−10	15	
25	Tapatío	16	2	6	8	16	26	−10	12	
26	Académicos	16	1	8	7	15	27	−12	11	
27	Tecos A	16	1	6	9	8	25	−17	9	

Source: FMF
Rules for classification: 1st points; 2nd goal difference; 3rd goals scored; 4th head-to-head; 5th away goals scored; 6th draw

=== Liguilla ===
Quarterfinals
1	Tijuana	3	1	4
8	Lobos BUAP	1	1	2
5	Dorados de Sinaloa	0	0	0
4	Salamanca	2	1	3
3	Mérida	1	3	4
6	Cruz Azul Hidalgo	0	1	1
7	Veracruz	0	2	2
2	Socio Águila	2	0	2

Semifinals
1	Tijuana	2	2	4
5	Salamanca	1	0	1
3	Mérida	3	0	3
2	Veracruz	0	0	0

Finals
1	Tijuana	0	0	0
3	Mérida	1	0	1

==== Quarter-finals ====
Team 1	Agg.	Team 2	1st leg	2nd leg
Tijuana	4–2	Lobos BUAP	3–1	1–1
Dorados	0–3	Salamanca	0–2	0–1
Mérida	4–1	Cruz Azul Hidalgo	1–0	3–1
Veracruz (s.)	2–2	Socio Águila	0–2	2–0

===== First leg =====
6 May 2009	Socio Águila	2–0	Veracruz	Mexico City
14:00	Silva 9' (own); Pineda 33'	Report		Stadium: Estadio Azteca; Attendance: 0 Referee: Miguel Ángel Flores RodrÍguez

6 May 2009	Salamanca	2–0	Dorados	Salamanca
17:00	Mendoza 36'; Damasceno 87'	Report		Stadium: Estadio Sección XXIV; Attendance: 0 Referee: Osvaldo Sánchez Huerta

7 May 2009	Lobos BUAP	1–3	Tijuana	Puebla City
11:00	Pacheco 31'	Report	Enríquez 41', 43'; López 88'	Stadium: Estadio Cuauhtémoc; Attendance: 0 Referee: Carlos Manuel Martínez Soto

7 May 2009	Cruz Azul Hidalgo	0–1	Mérida	Ciudad Cooperativa Cruz Azul
17:00		Report	Orozco 30'	Stadium: Estadio 10 de Diciembre; Attendance: 0 Referee: Jorge Antonio Pérez Durán

===== Second leg =====
9 May 2009	Veracruz	2–0 (2–2 agg.)	Socio Águila	Veracruz City
19:00	Bravo 10'; González 74'	Report		Stadium: Estadio Luis "Pirata" Fuente; Attendance: 14,000; Referee: Miguel Ángel Chacón Viveros

9 May 2009	Dorados	0–1 (0–3 agg.)	Salamanca	Culiacán
20:00		Report	Flores 77'	Stadium: Estadio Banorte; Attendance: 10,000; Referee: Fernando Torrez López

10 May 2009	Venados	3–1 (4–1 agg.)	Cruz Azul Hidalgo	Mérida
12:00	Olsina 19'; Mancinelli 30'; López 37'	Report	Jiménez 75'	Stadium: Estadio Carlos Iturralde; Attendance: 7,000; Referee: Oscar Macías Romo

10 May 2009	Tijuana	1–1 (4–2 agg.)	Lobos BUAP	Tijuana
13:00	Otreras 41'	Report	Hernández 84'	Stadium: Estadio Caliente; Attendance: 6,500; Referee: Miguel Ángel Ayala Ramírez

==== Semi-finals ====
Team 1	Agg.	Team 2	1st leg	2nd leg
Tijuana	4–1	Salamanca	2–1	2–0
Veracruz	0–3	Mérida	0–3	0–0

===== First leg =====
13 May 2009	Mérida	3–0	Veracruz	Mérida
15:00	López 36'; Olsina 40'; Díaz 60'	Report		Stadium: Estadio Carlos Iturralde; Attendance: 14,000; Referee: Miguel Ángel Ayala Ramírez

14 May 2009	Salamanca	1–2	Tijuana	Salamanca
17:00	Calderón 87'	Report	Enríquez 43'; Otreras 67'	Stadium: Estadio Sección XXIV; Attendance: 7,000; Referee: Jorge Antonio Pérez Durán

===== Second leg =====
16 May 2009	Veracruz	0–0 (0–3 agg.)	Mérida	Veracruz City
19:00		Report		Stadium: Estadio Luis "Pirata" Fuente; Attendance: 15,000; Referee: Miguel Ángel Chacón Viveros

17 May 2009	Tijuana	2–0 (4–1 agg.)	Salamanca	Tijuana
13:00	Enríquez 69', 86'	Report		Stadium: Estadio Caliente; Attendance: 13,000; Referee: Miguel Ángel Flores Rodríguez

==== Final ====
Team 1	Agg.	Team 2	1st leg	2nd leg
Tijuana	0–1	Mérida	0–1	0–0

===== First leg =====
21 May 2009	Mérida	1–0	Tijuana	Mérida
15:00	López 44'	Report		Stadium: Estadio Carlos Iturralde; Attendance: 20,000; Referee: Erim Ramirez

===== Second leg =====
24 May 2009	Tijuana	0–0 (0–1 agg.)	Mérida	Tijuana
13:00		Report		Stadium: Estadio Caliente; Attendance: 20,000; Referee: José Alfredo Peñaloza

Clausura 2009 winner

1st title

== Campeón de Ascenso 2009 ==
=== First leg ===
May 27, 2009
20:00 (UTC-5)

Querétaro	2–1	Mérida
Gerk 31' (pen.); Romo 47'		Orozco 68'

Estadio La Corregidora, Querétaro
Referee: Roberto García

=== Second leg ===
May 30, 2009
15:00 (UTC-5)

Mérida	1–0	Querétaro
Beltrán 49'
Penalties
López (penalty scored); Olsina (penalty missed); Saucedo (penalty scored); Orozco (penalty scored); García (penalty scored)	4–5	(penalty scored) Castro; (penalty scored) Tridente; (penalty scored) Giménez; (penalty scored) Piña; (penalty scored) Romo

Estadio Carlos Iturralde Rivero, Mérida
Referee: Mauricio Morales

Champions

2nd title

=== Results ===
==== Group 1 ====
Home \ Away	CHE	CHI	IRA	MER	QUE	REA	SAL	SLA	SOC
Chetumal		4–0	1–1	1–1	2–2	2–2	0–1	1–0	4–1
Chihuahua	2–2		2–0	0–2	1–2	3–1	1–1	1–1	1–0
Irapuato	1–1	2–3		0–0	1–0	1–1	3–1	0–2	2–1
Mérida	2–0	0–1	0–1		2–1	2–1	4–0	2–1	2–1
Querétaro	2–1	1–1	5–1	2–3		3–2	1–2	4–1	1–2
Real Colima	0–1	2–1	1–0	0–0	3–2		1–3	0–0	1–1
Salamanca	3–0	1–1	2–0	2–1	1–2	1–1		2–1	1–1
Santos Laguna	0–2	3–0	1–2	1–4	1–0	2–0	1–1		2–0
Socio Águila	2–1	4–1	2–2	1–0	1–0	1–0	2–0	1–0	

Legend: Blue = home team win; Yellow = draw; Red = away team win.

==== Group 2 ====
Home \ Away	ATM	LEÓ	SIN	TAM	TAP	UNL	UAT	UNM	VER
Atlético Mexiquense		0–2	1–0	2–2	2–0	0–0	2–2	1–0	1–2
León	1–0		1–1	0–2	1–2	5–0	2–1	1–0	1–1
Sinaloa	1–1	4–0		4–0	2–0	2–0	2–1	1–1	1–0
Tampico Madero	1–2	0–0	1–2		1–0	2–1	1–1	1–2	1–5
Tapatío	2–0	2–3	1–1	2–2		0–1	2–2	0–3	0–1
UANL	1–0	1–1	2–2	4–2	1–1		0–1	0–3	0–3
UAT	1–0	1–0	0–1	1–1	2–2	0–2		2–1	1–1
UNAM	6–0	1–1	2–2	1–0	2–2	1–1	1–1		2–1
Veracruz	2–0	3–2	4–4	1–1	2–0	0–0	0–0	1–0	

Legend: Blue = home team win; Yellow = draw; Red = away team win.

==== Group 3 ====
Home \ Away	ACA	BUP	CRU	DUR	MON	ORI	TAP	TIJ	UAG
Académicos		1–2	0–1	1–5	3–0	2–2	1–1	0–0	0–0
BUAP	4–0		3–2	2–2	2–0	1–2	2–0	1–1	1–1
Cruz Azul	1–1	2–1		1–1	2–0	0–0	3–0	2–2	4–0
Durango	3–2	0–0	2–2		0–0	1–1	1–1	3–2	2–0
Monterrey	0–0	1–1	3–0	0–0		3–2	0–0	1–2	3–0
Orizaba	1–1	0–1	0–1	1–0	2–0		2–1	0–2	0–1
Tapachula	2–0	2–2	1–1	0–1	1–2	2–1		2–2	4–1
Tijuana	4–2	2–1	1–0	2–2	3–1	0–0	1–0		2–0
UAG	1–1	1–1	0–1	1–1	0–1	0–1	1–1	1–2	

Updated to match(es) played on May 4, 2009. Source: FMF
Legend: Blue = home team win; Yellow = draw; Red = away team win.

=== Top scorers ===
Scorer	Goals	Team
(Mexico) Mauro Gerk	11	Querétaro
(Mexico) Raúl Enríquez	9	Tijuana
(Chile) Felipe Flores	9	Salamanca
(Mexico) Francisco Bravo	8	Veracruz
(Mexico) Luis Nieves	8	León
(Mexico) Jesús Morales	8	Chetumal
(Mexico) Luis Orozco	8	Mérida
(Mexico) Óscar Rojas	8	Pumas Morelos
(Mexico) Fernando González	8	Cruz Azul Hidalgo
(Mexico) Ismael Valadez	7	Chetumal
(Mexico) José Gutiérrez	6	Irapuato
(Mexico) Juan Hernández	6	Lobos BUAP
(Uruguay) Nicolás Olivera	6	Veracruz
(Paraguay) Osvaldo Moreno	6	Real Colima

Last updated: May 4, 2009.
Source: FMF

=== Relegation table ===
Pos.	Team	Pts	G	Ave.
1	Tijuana	65	32	2.0313
2	León	189	100	1.8900
3	Veracruz	58	32	1.8125
4	Dorados de Sinaloa	175	100	1.7500
5	Cruz Azul Hidalgo	171	100	1.7100
6	Querétaro	160	100	1.6000
7	Irapuato	50	32	1.5625
8	Correcaminos	151	100	1.5100
9	Pumas Morelos	150	100	1.5000
10	Mérida	97	66	1.4697
11	Orizaba	146	100	1.4600
12	Lobos BUAP	141	100	1.4100
13	Salamanca	140	100	1.4000
14	Durango	134	100	1.3400
15	Chihuahua	41	32	1.2813
16	Tigres B	128	100	1.2800
17	Real Colima	121	100	1.2100
18	Socio Águila	120	100	1.2000
19	Tampico Madero	118	100	1.1800
20	Monterrey	116	100	1.1600
21	Atlético Mexiquense	114	100	1.1400
22	Tapatío	114	100	1.1400
23	Académicos	102	100	1.0200
24	Chetumal	32	32	1.0000
25	Tecos	99	100	0.9900
26	Santos Laguna A	99	100	0.9900
27	Tapachula	52	66	0.7879

Last updated: May 4, 2009.
Source: FMF
