= Primera División A Clausura 2009 =

Season of a Mexican football league

The Primera División A Clausura 2009 is a Mexican football tournament, the second of two short tournaments held during the 2008–2009 Mexican football season. It began on January 10, 2009 and will run until May 23 or May 24, 2009. The winner of the tournament will earn a place in the promotional playoff against Querétaro, the winners of the Apertura 2008 tournament, to determine which team will be promoted to the Primera División.

== Tournament format ==
A total of 27 teams are divided into three groups of nine teams each. Each team plays the other eight teams in its group twice, once at home and once away, for a total of 16 games. At the end of the regular season the top two teams in each group, as well as the next two highest placed teams, qualify to the Liguilla (playoffs). The teams are seeded based on their position in the general table and are arranged before each round so that the highest seeded team remaining always plays the lowest seed remaining. The teams play a home and away series and whichever team has the better aggregate score advances. If the two teams are tied after both legs in the quarterfinals and semifinals the higher seed advances automatically. In the finals, if the two teams are tied after both legs two 15 minute halves of extra time are added. If the teams are still tied after extra time the champion is determined through a penalty shootout.

=== Promotion ===
One team is promoted to the Primera División each year (two short tournaments). After the Clausura 2009 tournament, the champions of the Apertura 2008 and Clausura 2009 tournaments will play a home and home series to determine which team will be promoted. If the same team wins both tournaments it will be promoted automatically. In order for a team to be promoted it has to obtain a certification from the Federación Mexicana de Fútbol Asociación. If the winner of the promotional final is not certified for promotion a home and away series is played between the highest placed certified team and the club being relegated to the Primera División A to determine which will be in the Primera División.

Currently certified teams

- Atlético Mexiquense
- BUAP
- Cruz Azul
- Durango
- Irapuato
- Mérida
- León
- Querétaro
- Santos Laguna
- Sinaloa
- Tijuana
- UAT
- Veracruz

=== Relegation ===
One team is relegated to the Segunda División each year (two short tournaments). The team that has the worst points to games played ratio over the previous three years (Apertura 2006, Clausura 2007, Apertura 2007, Clausura 2008, Apertura 2008, Clausura 2009) is relegated to the Segunda División.

== Group league tables ==
=== Group 1 ===
Pos	Team	Pld	W	D	L	GF	GA	GD	Pts	Qualification
1	Mérida	16	9	3	4	25	13	+12	30	Qualifies for the Liguilla and is certified for promotion
2	Socio Águila	16	8	3	5	21	18	+3	27	Qualifies for the Liguilla
3	Salamanca	16	7	5	4	22	20	+2	26	Qualifies for the Liguilla
4	Chetumal	16	5	6	5	23	20	+3	21	
5	Querétaro	16	6	2	8	28	25	+3	20	Certified for promotion
6	Irapuato	16	5	5	6	17	23	−6	20	Certified for promotion
7	Chihuahua	16	5	5	6	19	26	−7	20	
8	Santos Laguna	16	5	3	8	17	20	−3	18	Certified for promotion
9	Real Colima	16	3	6	7	16	23	−7	15	

Source: FMF
Rules for classification: 1st points; 2nd goal difference; 3rd goals scored; 4th head-to-head; 5th away goals scored; 6th draw

=== Group 2 ===
Pos	Team	Pld	W	D	L	GF	GA	GD	Pts	Qualification
1	Sinaloa	16	8	7	1	30	15	+15	31	Qualifies for the Liguilla and is certified for promotion
2	Veracruz	16	8	6	2	27	14	+13	30	Qualifies for the Liguilla and is certified for promotion
3	UNAM	16	6	6	4	26	15	+11	24	
4	León	16	6	5	5	21	19	+2	23	Certified for promotion
5	UAT	16	4	8	4	17	18	−1	20	Certified for promotion
6	UANL	16	4	6	6	14	23	−9	18	
7	Atlético Mexiquense	16	4	4	8	12	23	−11	16	Certified for promotion
8	Tampico Madero	16	3	6	7	18	28	−10	15	
9	Tapatío	16	2	6	8	16	26	−10	12	

Source: FMF
Rules for classification: 1st points; 2nd goal difference; 3rd goals scored; 4th head-to-head; 5th away goals scored; 6th draw

=== Group 3 ===
Pos	Team	Pld	W	D	L	GF	GA	GD	Pts	Qualification
1	Tijuana	16	9	6	1	28	16	+12	33	Qualifies for the Liguilla and is certified for promotion
2	Cruz Azul	16	7	6	3	23	16	+7	27	Qualifies for the Liguilla and is certified for promotion
3	BUAP	16	6	7	3	25	17	+8	25	Qualifies for the Liguilla and is certified for promotion
4	Durango	16	5	10	1	24	16	+8	25	Certified for promotion
5	Orizaba	16	5	5	6	15	16	−1	20	
6	Monterrey	16	5	5	6	16	18	−2	20	
7	Tapachula	16	3	7	6	18	21	−3	16	Last on the relegation table
8	Académicos	16	1	8	7	15	27	−12	11	
9	UAG	16	1	6	9	8	25	−17	9	

Source: FMF
Rules for classification: 1st points; 2nd goal difference; 3rd goals scored; 4th head-to-head; 5th away goals scored; 6th draw

== General league table ==
Pos	Team	Pld	W	D	L	GF	GA	GD	Pts	Qualification
1	Tijuana	16	9	6	1	28	16	+12	33	Qualifies for the Liguilla and is certified for promotion
2	Sinaloa	16	8	7	1	30	15	+15	31	Qualifies for the Liguilla and is certified for promotion
3	Veracruz	16	8	6	2	27	14	+13	30	Qualifies for the Liguilla and is certified for promotion
4	Mérida	16	9	3	4	25	13	+12	30	Qualifies for the Liguilla and is certified for promotion
5	Cruz Azul	16	7	6	3	23	16	+7	27	Qualifies for the Liguilla and is certified for promotion
6	Socio Águila	16	8	3	5	21	18	+3	27	Qualifies for the Liguilla
7	Salamanca	16	7	5	4	22	20	+2	26	Qualifies for the Liguilla
8	BUAP	16	6	7	3	25	17	+8	25	Qualifies for the Liguilla and is certified for promotion
9	Durango	16	5	10	1	24	16	+8	25	Certified for promotion
10	UNAM	16	6	6	4	26	15	+11	24	
11	León	16	6	5	5	21	19	+2	23	Certified for promotion
12	Chetumal	16	5	6	5	23	20	+3	21	
13	Querétaro	16	6	2	8	28	25	+3	20	Certified for promotion
14	UAT	16	4	8	4	17	18	−1	20	Certified for promotion
15	Orizaba	16	5	5	6	15	16	−1	20	
16	Monterrey	16	5	5	6	16	18	−2	20	
17	Irapuato	16	5	5	6	17	23	−6	20	Certified for promotion
18	Chihuahua	16	5	5	6	19	26	−7	20	
19	Santos Laguna	16	5	3	8	17	20	−3	18	Certified for promotion
20	UANL	16	4	6	6	14	23	−9	18	
21	Tapachula	16	3	7	6	18	21	−3	16	Last on the relegation table
22	Atlético Mexiquense	16	4	4	8	12	23	−11	16	Certified for promotion
23	Real Colima	16	3	6	7	16	23	−7	15	
24	Tampico Madero	16	3	6	7	18	28	−10	15	
25	Tapatío	16	2	6	8	16	26	−10	12	
26	Académicos	16	1	8	7	15	27	−12	11	
27	UAG	16	1	6	9	8	25	−17	9	

Source: FMF
Rules for classification: 1st points; 2nd goal difference; 3rd goals scored; 4th head-to-head; 5th away goals scored; 6th draw

== Liguilla ==
Quarterfinals
1	Tijuana	3	1	4
8	BUAP	1	1	2
5	Sinaloa	0	0	0
4	Salamanca	2	1	3
3	Mérida	1	3	4
6	Cruz Azul	0	1	1
7	Veracruz	0	2	2
2	Socio Águila	2	0	2

Semifinals
1	Tijuana	2	2	4
5	Salamanca	1	0	1
3	Mérida	3	0	3
2	Veracruz	0	0	0

Finals
1	Tijuana	0	0	0
3	Mérida	1	0	1

== Promotional Final ==
=== First leg ===
May 27, 2009
20:00 (UTC-5)

Querétaro	2–1	Mérida
Gerk 31' (pen.); Romo 47'		Orozco 68'

Estadio La Corregidora, Querétaro
Referee: Roberto García

=== Second leg ===
May 30, 2009
15:00 (UTC-5)

Mérida	1–0	Querétaro
Beltrán 49'
Penalties
López (penalty scored); Olsina (penalty missed); Saucedo (penalty scored); Orozco (penalty scored); García (penalty scored)	4–5	(penalty scored) Castro; (penalty scored) Tridente; (penalty scored) Giménez; (penalty scored) Piña; (penalty scored) Romo

Estadio Carlos Iturralde Rivero, Mérida
Referee: Mauricio Morales

== Results ==
=== Group 1 ===
Home \ Away	CHE	CHI	IRA	MER	QUE	REA	SAL	SLA	SOC
Chetumal		4–0	1–1	1–1	2–2	2–2	0–1	1–0	4–1
Chihuahua	2–2		2–0	0–2	1–2	3–1	1–1	1–1	1–0
Irapuato	1–1	2–3		0–0	1–0	1–1	3–1	0–2	2–1
Mérida	2–0	0–1	0–1		2–1	2–1	4–0	2–1	2–1
Querétaro	2–1	1–1	5–1	2–3		3–2	1–2	4–1	1–2
Real Colima	0–1	2–1	1–0	0–0	3–2		1–3	0–0	1–1
Salamanca	3–0	1–1	2–0	2–1	1–2	1–1		2–1	1–1
Santos Laguna	0–2	3–0	1–2	1–4	1–0	2–0	1–1		2–0
Socio Águila	2–1	4–1	2–2	1–0	1–0	1–0	2–0	1–0	

Legend: Blue = home team win; Yellow = draw; Red = away team win.

=== Group 2 ===
Home \ Away	ATM	LEÓ	SIN	TAM	TAP	UNL	UAT	UNM	VER
Atlético Mexiquense		0–2	1–0	2–2	2–0	0–0	2–2	1–0	1–2
León	1–0		1–1	0–2	1–2	5–0	2–1	1–0	1–1
Sinaloa	1–1	4–0		4–0	2–0	2–0	2–1	1–1	1–0
Tampico Madero	1–2	0–0	1–2		1–0	2–1	1–1	1–2	1–5
Tapatío	2–0	2–3	1–1	2–2		0–1	2–2	0–3	0–1
UANL	1–0	1–1	2–2	4–2	1–1		0–1	0–3	0–3
UAT	1–0	1–0	0–1	1–1	2–2	0–2		2–1	1–1
UNAM	6–0	1–1	2–2	1–0	2–2	1–1	1–1		2–1
Veracruz	2–0	3–2	4–4	1–1	2–0	0–0	0–0	1–0	

Legend: Blue = home team win; Yellow = draw; Red = away team win.

=== Group 3 ===
Home \ Away	ACA	BUP	CRU	DUR	MON	ORI	TAP	TIJ	UAG
Académicos		1–2	0–1	1–5	3–0	2–2	1–1	0–0	0–0
BUAP	4–0		3–2	2–2	2–0	1–2	2–0	1–1	1–1
Cruz Azul	1–1	2–1		1–1	2–0	0–0	3–0	2–2	4–0
Durango	3–2	0–0	2–2		0–0	1–1	1–1	3–2	2–0
Monterrey	0–0	1–1	3–0	0–0		3–2	0–0	1–2	3–0
Orizaba	1–1	0–1	0–1	1–0	2–0		2–1	0–2	0–1
Tapachula	2–0	2–2	1–1	0–1	1–2	2–1		2–2	4–1
Tijuana	4–2	2–1	1–0	2–2	3–1	0–0	1–0		2–0
UAG	1–1	1–1	0–1	1–1	0–1	0–1	1–1	1–2	

Updated to match(es) played on May 4, 2009. Source: FMF
Legend: Blue = home team win; Yellow = draw; Red = away team win.

== Top scorers ==
Scorer	Goals	Team
(Mexico) Mauro Gerk	11	Querétaro
(Mexico) Raúl Enríquez	9	Tijuana
(Chile) Felipe Flores	9	Salamanca
(Mexico) Francisco Bravo	8	Veracruz
(Mexico) Luis Nieves	8	León
(Mexico) Jesús Morales	8	Chetumal
(Mexico) Luis Orozco	8	Mérida
(Mexico) Óscar Rojas	8	UNAM
(Mexico) Fernando González	8	Cruz Azul
(Mexico) Ismael Valadez	7	Chetumal
(Mexico) José Gutiérrez	6	Irapuato
(Mexico) Juan Hernández	6	BUAP
(Uruguay) Nicolás Olivera	6	Veracruz
(Paraguay) Osvaldo Moreno	6	Real Colima

As of: May 4, 2009
Source: FMF

== Relegation table ==
Pos.	Team	Pts	G	Ave.
1	Tijuana	65	32	2.0313
2	León	189	100	1.8900
3	Veracruz	58	32	1.8125
4	Sinaloa	175	100	1.7500
5	Cruz Azul	171	100	1.7100
6	Querétaro	160	100	1.6000
7	Irapuato	50	32	1.5625
8	UAT	151	100	1.5100
9	UNAM	150	100	1.5000
10	Mérida	97	66	1.4697
11	Orizaba	146	100	1.4600
12	BUAP	141	100	1.4100
13	Salamanca	140	100	1.4000
14	Durango	134	100	1.3400
15	Chihuahua	41	32	1.2813
16	UANL	128	100	1.2800
17	Real Colima	121	100	1.2100
18	Socio Águila	120	100	1.2000
19	Tampico Madero	118	100	1.1800
20	Monterrey	116	100	1.1600
21	Atlético Mexiquense	114	100	1.1400
22	Tapatío	114	100	1.1400
23	Académicos	102	100	1.0200
24	Chetumal	32	32	1.0000
25	UAG	99	100	0.9900
26	Santos Laguna	99	100	0.9900
27	Tapachula	52	66	0.7879

Last updated: May 4, 2009.
Source: FMF
