= 2010 Liga de Ascenso Bicentenario =

Season of a Mexican football league

Liga de Ascenso
- Season: 2009–10
- Champions: Necaxa
- Top goalscorer: (Argentina) Ariel González (11 goals)
- Biggest home win: Necaxa 4–0 Guerreros (16 January 2010); Irapuato 4–0 Veracruz (17 January 2010); Mérida 4–0 La Piedad (30 January 2010)
- Biggest away win: Orizaba 1–4 Tijuana (6 February 2010)
- Highest scoring: Potros Neza 3–4 Pumas Morelos (31 January 2010); Durango 4–3 Guerreros (20 February 2010)

The 2010 Liga de Ascenso Bicentenario is the second football tournament of the 2009–10 Liga de Ascenso season.

== Club information ==
=== Stadia and locations ===
Locations of the Liga de Ascenso 2009–10 teams

Club	Stadium	Capacity	City
BUAP	Cuauhtémoc	46,912	Puebla
Cruz Azul Hidalgo	10 de Diciembre	17,000	Ciudad Cooperativa Cruz Azul
Durango	Francisco Zarco	18,000	Durango
Guerreros	Héroe de Nacozari	22,000	Hermosillo
Irapuato	Sergio León Chavez	33,000	Irapuato
La Piedad	Juan N. López	15,000	La Piedad
León	Nou Camp	33,943	León
Mérida	Carlos Iturralde	21,050	Mérida
Necaxa	Victoria	25,000	Aguascalientes
Orizaba	Luis de la Fuente	30,000	Veracruz
Potros Neza	Neza 86	28,500	Nezahualcóyotl
Pumas Morelos	Centenario	15,000	Cuernavaca
Sinaloa	Banorte	21,000	Culiacán
Tijuana	Caliente	33,333	Tijuana
UAT	Marte R. Gómez	19,500	Ciudad Victoria
U. de G.	Jalisco	60,000	Guadalajara
Veracruz	Luis de la Fuente	30,000	Veracruz

== Classification Phase ==
=== General table ===
Pos	Team	Pld	W	D	L	GF	GA	GD	Pts	Qualification
1	León (A)	16	10	4	2	25	13	+12	34	Advance to the semifinal
2	Necaxa (A)	16	8	8	0	25	13	+12	32	Advance to quarterfinal
3	Tijuana (A)	16	8	3	5	24	15	+9	27	Advance to quarterfinal
4	Pumas Morelos (A)	16	8	2	6	21	16	+5	26	Advance to quarterfinal
5	La Piedad (A)	16	8	1	7	16	18	−2	25	Advance to quarterfinal
6	UAT (A)	16	7	3	6	22	17	+5	24	Advance to quarterfinal
7	BUAP (A)	16	7	3	6	17	22	−5	24	Advance to quarterfinal
8	Irapuato	16	6	5	5	21	18	+3	23	
9	Cruz Azul Hidalgo	16	6	5	5	17	14	+3	23	
10	Mérida	16	5	7	4	21	13	+8	22	
11	Orizaba	16	4	10	2	19	17	+2	22	
12	Sinaloa	16	5	4	7	18	20	−2	19	
13	Potros Neza	16	4	5	7	24	26	−2	17	
14	Durango	16	4	3	9	20	28	−8	15	
15	Veracruz	16	4	3	9	18	26	−8	15	
16	U. de G.	16	3	4	9	15	28	−13	13	
17	Guerreros	16	2	4	10	11	28	−17	10	

Updated to match(es) played on 18 April 2010. Source: FeMexFut
Rules for classification: 1) points; 2) goal difference; 3) number of goals scored.
(A) Advance to a further round

==== Position by fixture ====
Team ╲ Round	1	2	3	4	5	6	7	8	9	10	11	12	13	14	15	16	17
BUAP	15	9	6	5	5	5	4	4	4	5	6	6	8	7	5	6	7
Cruz Azul Hidalgo	3	6	11	11	7	6	7	8	9	9	8	9	7	9	6	7	9
Durango	11	7	9	13	11	12	10	10	12	14	14	14	12	13	13	15	14
Guerreros	8	15	16	16	16	16	16	17	17	17	17	17	17	17	17	17	17
Irapuato	9	2	2	1	1	4	6	7	7	8	9	8	10	8	9	10	8
La Piedad	4	10	5	9	13	7	5	6	6	3	2	5	5	5	7	5	5
León	1	3	3	3	2	1	2	3	3	4	3	1	1	1	1	2	1
Mérida	12	4	10	6	6	8	11	9	8	11	11	12	13	12	11	11	10
Necaxa	2	1	1	2	3	2	1	1	2	2	4	3	3	4	2	1	2
Orizaba	6	11	13	10	14	14	12	12	11	10	10	11	9	10	10	8	11
Potros Neza	13	16	17	17	17	17	17	16	16	16	16	16	16	16	16	15	13
Pumas Morelos	5	14	7	4	8	9	8	5	5	6	5	4	4	3	4	4	4
Sinaloa	10	12	14	15	15	15	15	14	13	12	12	13	14	14	14	12	12
Tijuana	16	5	8	7	4	3	3	2	1	1	1	2	2	2	3	3	3
UAT	17	8	4	8	9	10	9	11	10	7	7	7	6	6	8	9	6
U. de G.	7	13	15	12	10	11	14	15	15	15	15	15	15	15	15	16	16
Veracruz	14	17	12	14	12	13	13	13	14	13	13	10	11	11	12	13	15

Source: (in Spanish)

=== Results ===
Home \ Away	BUP	CAH	DUR	GUE	IRA	LAP	LEÓ	MER	NEC	ORI	PTN	PUM	SIN	TIJ	UAT	UDG	VER
BUAP		0–1	1–0		2–2	2–1				0–3		1–3	1–0				2–2
Cruz Azul Hidalgo			1–1		2–0		1–1	0–0					2–1	1–2	1–0		3–1
Durango				4–3			1–3	1–2	2–3		1–0				1–3	1–2	
Guerreros	0–1	1–0			1–3	2–0				0–0		0–0	0–0				1–2
Irapuato			2–0				0–0	2–1	0–1		2–1			1–0	1–3		4–0
La Piedad		0–2	0–2		3–1		0–2			2–0			2–1	1–0			2–0
León	2–0			2–0				2–0	1–3		2–1	2–1			2–0	2–0	
Mérida	2–0			3–0		4–0			0–0	1–1	2–2	2–0		0–0		0–1	
Necaxa	2–2	1–0		4–0		0–0				0–0		2–1	2–2	3–2		1–1	
Orizaba		2–1	1–1		1–1		1–1						1–1	1–4	2–1		3–1
Potros Neza	1–2	1–1		2–1		0–2			1–1	2–2		3–4		1–1		3–2	
Pumas Morelos		2–0	2–0		1–0	0–1				1–1			0–1				1–0
Sinaloa			0–1		2–2		1–2	2–1			1–4			0–1	2–0		1–0
Tijuana	2–0		3–2	3–0			1–1					0–1				4–2	1–0
UAT	1–2			1–1		3–1		1–1	0–0		2–1	2–1		1–0		4–0	
U. de G.	0–1	1–1		3–1	0–0	0–1				0–0		1–3	1–3				
Veracruz			2–2				3–0	2–2	1–2		0–1				1–0	3–1	

Updated to match(es) played on 18 April 2010. Source: FeMexFut
Legend: Blue = home team win; Yellow = draw; Red = away team win.

== Final phase ==
Quarterfinals
4	Pumas Morelos	0	1	1
5	La Piedad	0	2	2
2	Necaxa	0	2	2
7	BUAP	0	0	0
3	Tijuana	2	1	3
6	UAT	1	1	2

Semifinals
1	León	2	5	7
5	La Piedad	0	0	0
2	Necaxa	0	5	5
3	Tijuana	0	2	2

Finals
1	León	0	2
2	Necaxa	3	1

- If the two teams are tied after both legs, the higher seeded team advances.
- The winner will qualify to the playoff match vs the Clausura 2010 winner

== Awards ==
Award	Player	Team
MVP		
Best Manager		
Best Goalkeeper		
Best Wingback		
Best Centre back		
Best Defensive Midfielder		
Best Offensive Midfielder		
Best Forward		
Best Rookie		
Golden Boot		
Source:Medio Tiempo

== Top-ten goalscorers ==
Rank	Player	Club	Goals
1	(Argentina) Carlos Casartelli	León	8
2	(Mexico) Raúl Enríquez	Tijuana	7
3	(Argentina) Ariel González	Irapuato	6
3	(Argentina) Mauro Gerk	Tijuana	6
5	(Uruguay) Nelson Maz	Necaxa	5
5	(Mexico) Pablo Bonells	Pumas Morelos	5
5	(Mexico) Luis Orozco	León	5
5	(Mexico) Rafael Murguía	La Piedad	5
Source: FeMexFut

== Relegation table ==
Relegation is determined by a quotient of the total points earned in the Liga de Ascenso divided by the total number of games played over the past three seasons of the Liga de Ascenso (for clubs that have not been in the Liga de Ascenso all three seasons, the last consecutive seasons of participation are taken into account). The club with the lowest quotient is relegated to the Segunda División Profesional for the next season.

Pos.	Club	Total Points	Total Games	Ave.
1	Necaxa	47	25	1.8800
2	León	170	92	1.8478
3	Tijuana	107	58	1.8448
4	Veracruz	97	57	1.7018
5	Sinaloa	153	91	1.6813
6	Irapuato	94	57	1.6491
7	BUAP	147	92	1.5978
8	Cruz Azul Hidalgo	141	91	1.5495
9	UAT	144	93	1.5484
10	Pumas Morelos	136	92	1.4783
11	Mérida	132	91	1.4505
12	Durango	122	91	1.3407
13	Orizaba	117	92	1.2717
13	La Piedad	117	92	1.2717
15	Potros Neza	59	57	1.0351
16	U. de G.	94	92	1.0217
17	Guerreros	81	91	0.8901

Last updated: 12 March 2010.
Source: FeMexFut

Relegated to Segunda División Profesional
