= 2011–12 Liga de Ascenso season =

Season of a Mexican football league

Liga de Ascenso
- Season: 2011–12
- Champions: Apertura: Correcaminos; Clausura: León
- Promoted: León
- Relegated: None

The 2011–12 Liga de Ascenso season is the second-level football league of Mexico.

== Changes for the 2011-2012 season ==
- Alacranes de Durango finished last in the 2010-2011 season and went bankrupt after several financial problems.
- Atlante UTN was renamed Toros Neza.
- Veracruz were suspended after the Clausura 2011 season for not paying players.
- Orizaba were moved to Veracruz and renamed Veracruz.
- Tijuana won promotion to Liga MX.
- Necaxa finished last place in the relegation table in Mexican Primera División and the team was relegated to Ascenso MX.
- Celaya won promotion to Liga de Ascenso from Segunda División de México.
- Mérida FC changed name to FC Mérida and updated logo.
- Lobos de la BUAP changed logo.
- Club Toros Neza changed name to Neza FC and updated logo.
- Indios were suspended after the Apertura 2011 due to financial problems.

== Stadia and locations ==
The following 16 clubs will compete in the Liga de Ascenso during the 2011–12 season:

Club	Location	Stadium	Capacity
Estudiantes de Altamira	Altamira	Altamira	9,581
Neza FC	Nezahualcóyotl	Neza 86	20,000
Lobos BUAP	Puebla	Estadio Olímpico de C.U.	19,283
Indios	Ciudad Juárez	Olímpico Benito Juárez	19,703
Cruz Azul Hidalgo	Ciudad Cooperativa Cruz Azul	10 de Diciembre	14,500
Necaxa	Aguascalientes	Estadio Victoria	23,851
Celaya	Celaya	Estadio Miguel Aleman	23,182
Irapuato	Irapuato	Sergio León Chavez	25,000
La Piedad	La Piedad	Juan N. López	13,356
León	León	Nou Camp	31,297
Mérida	Mérida	Carlos Iturralde	15,087
Pumas Morelos	Cuernavaca	Centenario	14,800
Dorados de Sinaloa	Culiacán	Banorte	17,898
Correcaminos	Ciudad Victoria	Marte R. Gómez	10,520
U. de G.	Guadalajara	Jalisco	55,020
Veracruz	Veracruz	Luis de la Fuente	28,703

== Apertura 2011 ==
The 2011 Apertura will be the first championship of the season. It began on 24 July 2011.

Liga de Ascenso
- Season: 2011–12
- Champions: Correcaminos
- Matches: 132
- Goals: 355 (2.69 per match)
- Top goalscorer: Apertura: (Argentina) Roberto Saucedo (13 goals)
- Biggest home win: Apertura: Irapuato 6–1 Altamira (27 August 2011); León 6–1 Dorados de Sinaloa (5 November 2011)
- Biggest away win: Apertura: Lobos BUAP 1–6 Indios (18 September 2011)
- Highest scoring: Apertura: Altamira 4-4 Correcaminos (7 October 2011); León 3-5 La Piedad (1 December 2011)

=== Standings ===
Pos	Team	Pld	W	D	L	GF	GA	GD	Pts	Qualification
1	La Piedad	15	10	1	4	26	17	+9	31	Qualification for Liguilla semifinals
2	Correcaminos	15	7	6	2	33	21	+12	27	Qualification for Liguilla quarterfinals
3	Neza	15	7	5	3	27	22	+5	26	Qualification for Liguilla quarterfinals
4	Léon	15	5	8	2	26	16	+10	23	Qualification for Liguilla quarterfinals
5	Irapuato	15	7	2	6	24	17	+7	23	Qualification for Liguilla quarterfinals
6	Necaxa	15	6	5	4	15	14	+1	23	Qualification for Liguilla quarterfinals
7	Altamira	15	6	4	5	22	22	0	22	Qualification for Liguilla quarterfinals
8	Veracruz	15	6	4	5	17	19	−2	22	
9	Pumas Morelos	15	5	6	4	15	16	−1	21	
10	Celaya	15	4	6	5	15	20	−5	18	
11	Lobos BUAP	15	4	6	5	13	18	−5	18	
12	U. de G.	15	3	6	6	16	22	−6	15	
13	Indios	15	4	2	9	20	24	−4	14	
14	Dorados de Sinaloa	15	3	5	7	20	30	−10	14	
15	Merida	15	3	4	8	15	19	−4	13	
16	Cruz Azul Hidalgo	15	2	6	7	14	21	−7	12	

Updated to match(es) played on 6 November 2011. Source: MedioTiempo.com competition.
Rules for classification: 1) points; 2) goal difference; 3) number of goals scored.

=== Results ===
Home \ Away	ALT	BUP	CEL	CRH	ICJ	IRA	LAP	LEO	MER	NEC	NEZ	PUM	SIN	UDG	UAT	VER
Altamira		0–0	0–1		4–2		1–0	1–1				3–1	2–0		4–4	
BUAP				1–0	1–6	1–0		1–2					0–1	1–0		0–2
Celaya		0–0		1–1	1–0		2–1	1–1				0–1	1–0		3–4	
Cruz Azul Hidalgo	1–2					1–0			0–3	2–1	1–2			2–2	2–2	1–1
Indios				2–1		1–2		0–1			0–2		1–0	0–1		2–0
Irapuato	6–1		3–1				2–3		1–0	0–1	4–3			2–1	0–0	
La Piedad		0–2		1–0	3–1			0–0				3–1	4–3		2–1	2–0
León				1–1		1–1				2–0	2–2		6–1	1–1		3–0
Mérida	0–0	0–0	3–0		1–1		2–3	2–1				0–0				
Necaxa	2–1	1–1	1–1		3–2		0–1		1–0			1–0				
Neza	3–0	2–2	3–1				2–1		2–1	1–0		1–1				
Pumas Morelos		2–2		1–0	2–2	1–0		2–1					1–1			2–0
Sinaloa				1–1		2–1			3–1	1–1	2–2			3–3	1–4	1–2
U. de G.	0–3		1–1				0–2		2–1	0–1	1–0	0–0				
UAT		2–1			2–0			3–3	2–1	1–1	4–0	2–0		2–2		
Veracruz	1–0		1–1			0–2			3–0	1–1	2–2			3–2	1–0	

Updated to match(es) played on 20 November 2011. Source:
Legend: Blue = home team win; Yellow = draw; Red = away team win.

=== Liguilla ===
The qualified teams play two games against each other on a home-and-away basis. The winner of each match up is determined by aggregate score.

The teams were seeded two to seven in the quarterfinals, and the winners are joined by the top-ranked team in the semi-finals. The teams are re-seeded one to four in the semifinals, depending on their position in the general table. The higher seeded teams play on their home field during the second leg.

Quarterfinals
4	León	1	2	3
5	Irapuato	0	0	0
2	Correcaminos	1	1	2
7	Altamira	2	0	2
3	Neza	1	2	3
6	Necaxa	0	2	2

Semifinals
1	La Piedad	5	1	6
4	León	3	2	5
2	Correcaminos	1	2	3
3	Neza	2	1	3

Finals
1	La Piedad	1	0	1
2	Correcaminos	3	1	4

- If the two teams are tied after both legs, the higher seeded team advances.
- Teams are re-seeded every round.
- The winner qualify to the playoff match vs the Clausura 2012 winner. However, if the winner is the same in both tournaments, they would be the team promoted to the 2012–13 Mexican Primera División season without playing the Promotional Final

Apertura 2011 winners:

2nd title

=== Top goalscorers ===
Players sorted first by goals scored, then by last name.

Rank	Player	Club	Goals
1	(Argentina) Roberto Nicolás Saucedo	Correcaminos	13
2	(Brazil) Luciano Emílio	Neza	10
2	(Mexico) José Cruz Gutiérrez	Irapuato	10
2	(Mexico) Ismael Valadéz	Altamira	10
5	(Mexico) Roberto Nurse	La Piedad	9
5	(Argentina) Pablo Gabriel Torres	Cruz Azul Hidalgo	9
7	(Mexico) Ever Guzmán	Mérida	8
7	(Uruguay) Nelson Sebastián Maz	León	8
7	(Brazil) Eder Pacheco	León	8
10	(Mexico) Víctor Lojero	Necaxa	6
10	(Argentina) Diego Olsina	Correcaminos	6
10	(Guatemala) Carlos Ruiz	Veracruz	6

== Clausura 2012 ==
The 2012 Clausura is the second championship of the season. It began on 6 January 2012 & ended on 15 April 2012. Before the 2012 Clausura tournament started, Ciudad Juárez was disaffiliated due to economical problems.

Liga de Ascenso
- Season: 2011–12
- Champions: León
- Matches: 105
- Goals: 274 (2.61 per match)
- Top goalscorer: Clausura: (Uruguay) Nelson Sebastián Maz (13 goals)
- Biggest home win: Clausura:León 5–0 Celaya (17 March); León 5–0 Altamira (31 March)
- Biggest away win: Clausura:
- Highest scoring: Clausura:Neza 3–4 León (29 January); León 5–2 Lobos BUAP (4 February); Veracruz 2–5 León (10 March)
- Longest winning run: León
- Longest unbeaten run: León (14 Games)

=== Standings ===
Pos	Team	Pld	W	D	L	GF	GA	GD	Pts	Qualification
1	Léon	14	10	4	0	41	13	+28	34	Qualification for Liguilla semifinals
2	Merida	14	8	4	2	16	8	+8	28	Qualification for Liguilla quarterfinals
3	Necaxa	14	8	3	3	20	13	+7	27	Qualification for Liguilla quarterfinals
4	Neza	14	6	6	2	25	16	+9	24	Qualification for Liguilla quarterfinals
5	Lobos BUAP	14	6	2	6	20	20	0	20	Qualification for Liguilla quarterfinals
6	U. de G.	14	5	5	4	11	11	0	20	Qualification for Liguilla quarterfinals
7	Correcaminos	14	5	4	5	22	16	+6	19	Qualification for Liguilla quarterfinals
8	La Piedad	14	5	4	5	22	17	+5	19	
9	Celaya	14	5	4	5	20	23	−3	19	
10	Irapuato	14	4	4	6	13	17	−4	16	
11	Dorados de Sinaloa	14	4	2	8	15	23	−8	14	
12	Pumas Morelos	14	3	4	7	7	16	−9	13	
13	Altamira	14	4	1	9	15	29	−14	13	
14	Veracruz	14	3	3	8	13	24	−11	12	
15	Cruz Azul Hidalgo	14	2	4	8	14	28	−14	10	

Updated to match(es) played on 8 April 2012. Source: competition.
Rules for classification: 1) points; 2) goal difference; 3) number of goals scored.

=== Results ===
Home \ Away	ALT	BUP	CEL	CRH	IRA	LAP	LEO	MER	NEC	NEZ	PUM	SIN	UDG	UAT	VER
Altamira				3–4	1–1			0–2	2–0	1–2			1–0		2–0
BUAP	3–1		1–1			1–0		1–2	1–2	0–1	1–1			2–0	
Celaya	2–0				2–1			1–2	2–2	1–1			1–2		2–1
Cruz Azul Hidalgo		2–3	2–3			2–1	0–3				0–0	1–1			
Irapuato		2–0		1–0			1–2				0–0	1–0			2–1
La Piedad	2–0		1–2		3–0			0–0	1–2	2–2			1–2		
León	5–0	5–2	5–0			1–1		2–2			3–0			2–0	
Mérida				1–0	1–0				2–0	1–1		1–0	1–1	1–0	1–1
Necaxa				1–0	3–1		1–1			0–2		3–0	1–0	1–0	3–0
Neza				4–1	2–2		3–4					1–1	3–0	1–1	2–1
Pumas Morelos	0–1		2–1			0–3		1–0	1–1	1–0			0–1	1–2	
Sinaloa	4–3	1–0	2–1			1–2	1–3				2–0				
U. de G.		2–3		1–1	0–0		0–0					2–0		0–0	0–0
UAT	4–0		1–1	5–0	2–1	2–2						4–2			1–2
Veracruz		0–2		1–1		2–3	2–5				1–0	1–0			

Updated to match(es) played on 15 April 2012. Source:
Legend: Blue = home team win; Yellow = draw; Red = away team win.

=== Liguilla ===
(Source for Liguilla information)

The qualified teams play two games against each other on a home-and-away basis. The winner of each match up is determined by aggregate score.

The teams ranked 2 to 7 in the regular stage progress to the quarterfinals, whilst the league winners qualify directly to the semi-finals. The higher ranked teams play on their home field during the second leg.

Quarterfinals
2	Mérida	0	1	1
7	UAT	2	1	3
3	Necaxa	1	0	1
6	U. de G.	1	0	1
4	Neza	0	0	0
5	Lobos BUAP	1	0	1

Semifinals
1	León	1	0	1
7	UAT	0	0	0
3	Necaxa	0	1	1
5	Lobos BUAP	3	0	3

Finals
1	León	3	4	7
5	Lobos BUAP	3	0	3

- If the two teams are tied after both legs, the higher seeded team advances.
- The winner qualifies to the Championship Final vs the Apertura 2011 winner.

==== Quarter-finals ====
Team 1	Agg.	Team 2	1st leg	2nd leg
Mérida	1–3	UAT	0–2	1–1
Necaxa	1–1	U. de G.	1–1	0–0
Neza	0–1	Lobos BUAP	0–1	0–0

===== First leg =====
18 April 2012	UAT	2–0	Mérida	Ciudad Victoria
19:00	J. Sara 18'; D. Olsina 25'	Report		Stadium: Estadio Marte R. Gómez; Attendance: 18,000; Referee: Quetzalli Alvarado Godínez

18 April 2012	U. de G.	1–1	Necaxa	Guadalajara
20:50	C. Valdovinos 90+3'	Report	J. Correa 45'	Stadium: Estadio Jalisco; Attendance: 31,000; Referee: Erick Yaír Miranda Galindo

19 April 2012	Lobos BUAP	1–0	Neza	Puebla
16:00	M. Castillo 90'	Report		Stadium: Estadio Universitario BUAP; Attendance: 19,000; Referee: Obed Eliud Gómez Barreras

===== Second leg =====
21 April 2012	Necaxa	0–0 (1–1 agg.)	U. de G.	Aguascalientes
17:00		Report		Stadium: Estadio Victoria; Attendance: 9,000; Referee: Víctor Bisguerra Mendiola

21 April 2012	Mérida	1–1 (1–3 agg.)	UAT	Mérida
19:00	D. Jiménez 81'	Report	R. Saucedo 73'	Stadium: Estadio Carlos Iturralde; Attendance: 14,000; Referee: Gerardo García Acevedo

22 April 2012	Neza	0–0 (0–1 agg.)	Lobos BUAP	Ciudad Nezahualcóyotl
12:00		Report		Stadium: Estadio Neza 86; Attendance: 10,500; Referee: Roberto Ríos Jácome

==== Semi-finals ====
Team 1	Agg.	Team 2	1st leg	2nd leg
León	1–0	UAT	1–0	0–0
Necaxa	1–3	Lobos BUAP	0–3	1–0

===== First leg =====
25 April 2012	Lobos BUAP	3–0	Necaxa	Puebla
16:00	G. Ramírez 46', 57'; D. Jiménez 49'	Report		Stadium: Estadio Universitario BUAP; Attendance: 19,000; Referee: Óscar Bernardo Villagómez Gurría

25 April 2012	UAT	0–1	León	Ciudad Victoria
20:00		Report	S. Maz 29'	Stadium: Estadio Marte R. Gómez; Attendance: 18,000; Referee: Roberto Ríos Jácome

===== Second leg =====
28 April 2012	Necaxa	1–0 (1–3 agg.)	Lobos BUAP	Aguascalientes
18:00	A. Castillo 26'	Report		Stadium: Estadio Victoria; Attendance: 7,000; Referee: Luis Enrique Santander Aguirre

28 April 2012	León	0–0 (1–0 agg.)	UAT	León
20:00		Report		Stadium: Nou Camp; Attendance: 30,000; Referee: Gerardo García Acevedo

==== Final ====
Team 1	Agg.	Team 2	1st leg	2nd leg
León	7–3	Lobos BUAP	3–3	4–0

===== First leg =====
2 May 2012	Lobos BUAP	3–3	León	Puebla
16:00	J. García 18', 28', 30'	Report	L. Nieves 7'; S. Maz 48'; L. Montes 60'	Stadium: Estadio Universitario BUAP; Attendance: 19,681; Referee: Obed Eliud Gómez Barreras

===== Second leg =====
5 May 2012	León	4–0 (7–3 agg.)	Lobos BUAP	León
20:00	C. Peña 23'; S. Maz 76', 81', 83'	Report		Stadium: Nou Camp; Attendance: 30,866; Referee: Gerardo García Acevedo

Clausura 2012 winner:

4th title

== Campeón de Ascenso 2012 ==
=== First leg ===
9 May 2012
20:00

UAT	2–1	León
J. López 18'; R. Saucedo 42'		I. González 90+1'

Estadio Marte R. Gómez, Ciudad Victoria
Attendance: 18,000
Referee: Luis Enrique Santander Aguirre

=== Second leg ===
12 May 2012
20:00

León	5–0	UAT
C. Peña 17'; L. Nieves 21'; E. Pacheco 44'; H. Burbano 70', 75'

Estadio León, León, Guanajuato
Attendance: 30,866
Referee: Luis Enrique Santander Aguirre

Champions

1st title

== Relegation ==
Pos	Team	'09 A Pts	'10 C Pts	'10 A Pts	'11 C Pts	'11 A Pts	'12 C Pts	Total Pts	Total Pld	Avg
1	León	21	34	25	34	20	34	168	92	1.8261
2	Necaxa	0	0	0	0	20	27	47	28	1.6786
3	Irapuato	32	23	24	33	20	16	148	92	1.6087
4	Lobos BUAP	28	24	27	15	18	20	132	92	1.4348
5	Neza	24	17	9	29	23	24	126	92	1.3696
6	Correcaminos	19	24	15	24	24	19	125	92	1.3587
7	La Piedad	18	25	18	15	28	19	123	92	1.337
8	Dorados de Sinaloa	26	19	22	24	14	14	119	92	1.2935
9	Pumas Morelos	21	26	19	19	20	13	118	92	1.2826
10	Altamira	0	0	23	21	19	13	76	60	1.2667
11	Cruz Azul Hidalgo	25	23	22	24	12	10	116	92	1.2609
12	Mérida	24	22	12	16	12	28	114	92	1.2391
13	Celaya	0	0	0	0	15	19	34	28	1.2143
13	Veracruz	0	0	0	0	22	12	34	28	1.2143
15	U. de G.	13	13	18	14	12	20	90	92	0.9783

Updated on 21 November 2011
Source: femexfut.com
