= 2009–10 Liga de Ascenso season =

Season of a Mexican football league

Liga de Ascenso
- Season: 2009–10
- Champions: Apertura: Necaxa; Clausura: Necaxa
- Promoted: Necaxa
- Relegated: None

The 2009-2010 season was the first under the new name Liga de Ascenso, renamed from Primera A.

Also the Clausura part of the tournament was renamed Bicentenario 2010 in honor of the 200 year anniversary of the declaration for Mexican Independence.

== Changes ==
From Clausura 2009 to the new format there were many changes, the 3 group format was dropped in favor of 1 single table with the top 7 teams advancing to the playoffs, the top team over all to the semifinals and the next 6 teams to the quarterfinals.

The number of teams decreased from 27 to 17 teams

- Querétaro won Promotion to Primera Division de Mexico
- Necaxa finished last in Liga MX and was relegated to Liga de Ascenso
- Real Colima moved to Hermosillo and renamed as Guerreros.
- Salamanca moved to La Piedad and was renamed La Piedad
- Potros Chetumal re-branded to Toros Neza
- Tapatío re-branded to U. de G.

== Dropped teams ==
- Socio Aguila
- Chihuahua (Indios B)
- Santos Laguna (Santos B)
- Real Colima
- Tigres B
- Atlético Mexiquense
- Tampico Madero
- Monterrey B
- Tapachula (Jaguares B)
- Academicos (Atlas B)

== Stadium and locations ==
Locations of the Liga de Ascenso 2009–10 teams

Club	Stadium	Capacity	City
Lobos BUAP	Cuauhtémoc	46,912	Puebla
Cruz Azul Hidalgo	10 de Diciembre	17,000	Mexico City
Durango	Francisco Zarco	18,000	Durango
Guerreros	Héroe de Nacozari	22,000	Hermosillo
Irapuato	Sergio León Chavez	33,000	Irapuato
La Piedad	Juan N. López	17,000	La Piedad
León	Nou Camp	33,943	León
Mérida	Carlos Iturralde	21,050	Mérida
Necaxa	Victoria	25,000	Aguascalientes
Orizaba	Luis de la Fuente	30,000	Veracruz
Potros Neza	Neza 86	28,500	Nezahualcóyotl
Pumas Morelos	Centenario	15,237	Cuernavaca
Dorados de Sinaloa	Banorte	21,000	Culiacán
Tijuana	Caliente	33,333	Tijuana
Correcaminos	Marte R. Gómez	19,500	Ciudad Victoria
U. de G.	Jalisco	60,000	Guadalajara
Veracruz	Luis de la Fuente	30,000	Veracruz

== Apertura 2009 ==
Liga de Ascenso
- Season: 2009–10
- Champions: Necaxa
- Matches: 136
- Goals: 329 (2.42 per match)
- Top goalscorer: Ariel González (11)
- Biggest home win: León 5–1 Cruz Azul Hidalgo (23 August 2009); Necaxa 5–1 Potros Neza (24 October 2009); Veracruz 4–0 Cruz Azul Hidalgo (7 November 2009)
- Biggest away win: Sinaloa 0–2 Lobos BUAP (15 August 2009); Orizaba 1–3 Necaxa (26 September 2009); Durango 3–5 Pumas Morelos (4 October 2009)
- Highest scoring: Durango 3–5 Pumas Morelos (4 October 2009)

The 2009 Liga de Ascenso Apertura was the first and inaugural football tournament of the 2009–10 Liga de Ascenso season. The tournament began on July 31, 2009, and ended on December 13, 2009.

=== Standings ===
Pos	Team	Pld	W	D	L	GF	GA	GD	Pts	Qualification
1	Irapuato (A)	16	10	2	4	28	18	+10	32	Qualification for Liga de Ascenso Apertura 2009 Liguilla Semi-finals
2	Lobos BUAP (A)	16	8	4	4	19	13	+6	28	Qualification for Liga de Ascenso Apertura 2009 Liguilla Quarter-finals
3	Necaxa (A)	16	8	4	4	23	18	+5	28	Qualification for Liga de Ascenso Apertura 2009 Liguilla Quarter-finals
4	Veracruz (A)	16	8	4	4	18	13	+5	28	Qualification for Liga de Ascenso Apertura 2009 Liguilla Quarter-finals
5	Dorados de Sinaloa (A)	16	8	2	6	23	22	+1	26	Qualification for Liga de Ascenso Apertura 2009 Liguilla Quarter-finals
6	Cruz Azul Hidalgo (A)	16	7	4	5	21	22	−1	25	Qualification for Liga de Ascenso Apertura 2009 Liguilla Quarter-finals
7	Potros Neza (A)	16	6	6	4	24	21	+3	24	Qualification for Liga de Ascenso Apertura 2009 Liguilla Quarter-finals
8	Merida	16	6	6	4	18	15	+3	24	
9	Pumas Morelos	16	4	9	3	21	19	+2	21	
10	Léon	16	6	3	7	27	26	+1	21	
11	Tijuana	16	5	5	6	18	14	+4	20	
12	Durango	16	5	5	6	23	24	−1	20	
13	Correcaminos	16	6	1	9	18	22	−4	19	
14	La Piedad	16	4	6	6	22	21	+1	18	
15	Orizaba	16	3	4	9	12	19	−7	13	
16	U. de G.	16	2	7	7	11	21	−10	13	
17	Guerreros	16	2	4	10	6	24	−18	10	

Updated to match(es) played on 22 November 2009. Source: FeMexFut
Rules for classification: 1) points; 2) goal difference; 3) number of goals scored.
(A) Advance to a further round

=== Position by fixture ===
Team ╲ Round	1	2	3	4	5	6	7	8	9	10	11	12	13	14	15	16	17
Irapuato	1	7	2	1	1	2	1	1	1	1	1	1	1	1	1	1	1
BUAP	15	15	10	4	9	11	13	11	11	7	9	11	6	4	3	4	2
Necaxa	4	5	1	5	8	8	5	4	3	2	2	3	2	3	4	3	3
Veracruz	13	9	3	3	4	3	2	2	2	5	3	2	3	2	2	2	4
Sinaloa	2	2	9	12	6	5	9	7	4	8	4	4	8	6	7	7	5
Cruz Azul Hidalgo	6	6	6	13	7	6	4	8	12	9	10	5	4	5	6	6	6
Potros Neza	5	3	8	9	10	9	6	10	10	12	12	10	12	14	12	9	7
Mérida	11	12	7	8	12	14	11	9	8	4	7	6	7	8	5	5	8
Pumas Morelos	8	11	12	11	13	13	14	15	15	14	13	13	14	12	14	13	9
León	12	8	13	7	5	4	8	5	7	3	6	9	10	11	11	8	10
Tijuana	9	4	11	10	3	7	10	12	6	11	11	12	9	9	8	10	11
Durango	14	13	15	16	15	17	15	16	16	16	17	14	13	10	9	11	12
UAT	3	10	4	2	2	1	3	3	5	10	5	7	5	7	10	12	13
La Piedad	10	1	5	6	11	10	7	6	9	6	8	8	11	13	13	14	14
Orizaba	7	14	14	15	16	15	16	13	14	15	16	17	17	15	15	15	15
U. de G.	16	17	17	14	14	12	12	14	13	13	14	15	15	16	16	16	16
Guerreros	17	16	16	17	17	16	17	17	17	17	15	16	16	17	17	17	17

Source: (in Spanish)

=== Results ===
Home \ Away	BUP	CAH	DUR	GUE	IRA	LAP	LEÓ	MER	NEC	ORI	PTN	PUM	SIN	TIJ	UAT	UDG	VER
BUAP				3–0			3–2	1–0	1–0		1–1			2–0	2–1	1–2	
Cruz Azul Hidalgo	2–0			3–0		3–0			2–0	1–0	2–1	1–1				0–0	
Durango	0–0	2–2			2–3	2–0				1–0		3–5	2–2	2–2			1–2
Guerreros			0–1				2–1	0–2	0–0		0–2			1–0	1–2	0–1	
Irapuato	2–1	1–2		4–0		1–0				1–0		2–1	3–1			3–1	
La Piedad	1–2			0–0				2–2	1–1		2–2	1–2			4–1	4–0	
León		5–1	0–2		3–2	1–3				1–0			2–2	2–1			3–0
Mérida		1–0	2–0		1–1		2–0						2–1		0–2		0–0
Necaxa			2–1		3–1		2–1	1–0			5–1				2–1		1–0
Orizaba	0–0			1–0		1–1		3–1	1–3		2–0	1–1				1–1	
Potros Neza			2–1		1–2		1–1	1–1					4–1		2–1		3–0
Pumas Morelos	0–0			1–1			1–2	1–1	1–1		2–2			2–1	1–0	0–0	
Sinaloa	0–2	2–1		2–0		1–2			3–1	1–0		3–2				2–0	
Tijuana		4–0			0–0	1–1		0–1	3–0	3–1	0–0		1–0		0–1		
UAT		1–1	1–2		0–1		3–2			3–1			0–1				0–2
U. de G.			1–1				1–1	2–2	1–1		0–1			0–1	0–1		1–2
Veracruz	2–0	4–0		1–1	2–1	1–0				1–0		0–0	0–1	1–1			

Updated to match(es) played on 22 November 2009. Source: FeMexFut
Legend: Blue = home team win; Yellow = draw; Red = away team win.

=== Final phase ===
Quarterfinals
4	Veracruz	0	1	1
5	Dorados de Sinaloa	1	0	1
2	Lobos BUAP	2	1	3
7	Potros Neza	1	0	1
3	Necaxa	1	2	3
6	Cruz Azul Hidalgo	1	0	1

Semifinals
1	Irapuato	0	3	3
4	Veracruz	1	0	1
2	Lobos BUAP	0	0	0
3	Necaxa	2	0	2

Finals
1	Irapuato	0	3	3
3	Necaxa	1	3	4

- If the two teams are tied after both legs, the higher seeded team advances.
- The winner will qualify to the playoff match vs the Clausura 2010 winner

Apertura 2009 winner:

1st title

=== Top goalscorers ===
Rank	Player	Club	Goals
1	(Mexico) Ariel González	Irapuato	11
2	(Mexico) Fausto David Ruiz	Potros Neza	10
3	(Uruguay) Bosco Frontán	La Piedad	8
4	(Uruguay) Nelson Sebastián Maz	Necaxa	8
5	(Mexico) Raúl Enríquez	Tijuana	8
6	(Mexico) Luis Orozco	León	7
7	(Mexico) Pedro Solís	Correcaminos	7
8	(Mexico) Francisco Bravo	Veracruz	7
9	(Uruguay) Dany González	Durango	7
10	(Uruguay) Álvaro González	Lobos BUAP	7
Source: FeMexFut

== Bicentenario 2010 ==
Liga de Ascenso
- Season: 2009–10
- Champions: Necaxa
- Top goalscorer: (Argentina) Ariel González (11 goals)
- Biggest home win: Necaxa 4–0 Guerreros (16 January 2010); Irapuato 4–0 Veracruz (17 January 2010); Mérida 4–0 La Piedad (30 January 2010)
- Biggest away win: Orizaba 1–4 Tijuana (6 February 2010)
- Highest scoring: Potros Neza 3–4 Pumas Morelos (31 January 2010); Durango 4–3 Guerreros (20 February 2010)

The 2010 Liga de Ascenso Bicentenario is the second football tournament of the 2009–10 Liga de Ascenso season.

=== Standings ===
Pos	Team	Pld	W	D	L	GF	GA	GD	Pts	Qualification
1	Léon	16	10	4	2	25	13	+12	34	Advance to the semifinal
2	Necaxa	16	8	8	0	25	13	+12	32	Advance to quarterfinal
3	Tijuana	16	8	3	5	24	15	+9	27	Advance to quarterfinal
4	Pumas Morelos	16	8	2	6	21	16	+5	26	Advance to quarterfinal
5	La Piedad	16	8	1	7	16	18	−2	25	Advance to quarterfinal
6	Correcaminos	16	7	3	6	22	17	+5	24	Advance to quarterfinal
7	Lobos BUAP	16	7	3	6	17	22	−5	24	Advance to quarterfinal
8	Irapuato	16	6	5	5	21	18	+3	23	
9	Cruz Azul Hidalgo	16	6	5	5	17	14	+3	23	
10	Merida	16	5	7	4	21	13	+8	22	
11	Orizaba	16	4	10	2	19	17	+2	22	
12	Dorados de Sinaloa	16	5	4	7	18	20	−2	19	
13	Potros Neza	16	4	5	7	24	26	−2	17	
14	Durango	16	4	3	9	20	28	−8	15	
15	Veracruz	16	4	3	9	18	26	−8	15	
16	U. de G.	16	3	4	9	15	28	−13	13	
17	Guerreros	16	2	4	10	11	28	−17	10	

Updated to match(es) played on 18 April 2010. Source: FeMexFut
Rules for classification: 1) points; 2) goal difference; 3) number of goals scored.

=== Position by fixture ===
Team ╲ Round	1	2	3	4	5	6	7	8	9	10	11	12	13	14	15	16	17
BUAP	15	9	6	5	5	5	4	4	4	5	6	6	8	7	5	6	7
Cruz Azul Hidalgo	3	6	11	11	7	6	7	8	9	9	8	9	7	9	6	7	9
Durango	11	7	9	13	11	12	10	10	12	14	14	14	12	13	13	15	14
Guerreros	8	15	16	16	16	16	16	17	17	17	17	17	17	17	17	17	17
Irapuato	9	2	2	1	1	4	6	7	7	8	9	8	10	8	9	10	8
La Piedad	4	10	5	9	13	7	5	6	6	3	2	5	5	5	7	5	5
León	1	3	3	3	2	1	2	3	3	4	3	1	1	1	1	2	1
Mérida	12	4	10	6	6	8	11	9	8	11	11	12	13	12	11	11	10
Necaxa	2	1	1	2	3	2	1	1	2	2	4	3	3	4	2	1	2
Orizaba	6	11	13	10	14	14	12	12	11	10	10	11	9	10	10	8	11
Potros Neza	13	16	17	17	17	17	17	16	16	16	16	16	16	16	16	15	13
Pumas Morelos	5	14	7	4	8	9	8	5	5	6	5	4	4	3	4	4	4
Sinaloa	10	12	14	15	15	15	15	14	13	12	12	13	14	14	14	12	12
Tijuana	16	5	8	7	4	3	3	2	1	1	1	2	2	2	3	3	3
UAT	17	8	4	8	9	10	9	11	10	7	7	7	6	6	8	9	6
U. de G.	7	13	15	12	10	11	14	15	15	15	15	15	15	15	15	16	16
Veracruz	14	17	12	14	12	13	13	13	14	13	13	10	11	11	12	13	15

Source: (in Spanish)

=== Results ===
Home \ Away	BUP	CAH	DUR	GUE	IRA	LAP	LEÓ	MER	NEC	ORI	PTN	PUM	SIN	TIJ	UAT	UDG	VER
BUAP		0–1	1–0		2–2	2–1				0–3		1–3	1–0				2–2
Cruz Azul Hidalgo			1–1		2–0		1–1	0–0					2–1	1–2	1–0		3–1
Durango				4–3			1–3	1–2	2–3		1–0				1–3	1–2	
Guerreros	0–1	1–0			1–3	2–0				0–0		0–0	0–0				1–2
Irapuato			2–0				0–0	2–1	0–1		2–1			1–0	1–3		4–0
La Piedad		0–2	0–2		3–1		0–2			2–0			2–1	1–0			2–0
León	2–0			2–0				2–0	1–3		2–1	2–1			2–0	2–0	
Mérida	2–0			3–0		4–0			0–0	1–1	2–2	2–0		0–0		0–1	
Necaxa	2–2	1–0		4–0		0–0				0–0		2–1	2–2	3–2		1–1	
Orizaba		2–1	1–1		1–1		1–1						1–1	1–4	2–1		3–1
Potros Neza	1–2	1–1		2–1		0–2			1–1	2–2		3–4		1–1		3–2	
Pumas Morelos		2–0	2–0		1–0	0–1				1–1			0–1				1–0
Sinaloa			0–1		2–2		1–2	2–1			1–4			0–1	2–0		1–0
Tijuana	2–0		3–2	3–0			1–1					0–1				4–2	1–0
UAT	1–2			1–1		3–1		1–1	0–0		2–1	2–1		1–0		4–0	
U. de G.	0–1	1–1		3–1	0–0	0–1				0–0		1–3	1–3				
Veracruz			2–2				3–0	2–2	1–2		0–1				1–0	3–1	

Updated to match(es) played on 18 April 2010. Source: FeMexFut
Legend: Blue = home team win; Yellow = draw; Red = away team win.

=== Final phase ===
Quarterfinals
4	Pumas Morelos	0	1	1
5	La Piedad	0	2	2
2	Necaxa	0	2	2
7	BUAP	0	0	0
3	Tijuana	2	1	3
6	Correcaminos	1	1	2

Semifinals
1	León	2	5	7
5	La Piedad	0	0	0
2	Necaxa	0	5	5
3	Tijuana	0	2	2

Finals
1	León	0	2	2
2	Necaxa	3	1	4

- If the two teams are tied after both legs, the higher-seeded team advances.
- The winner will qualify to the playoff match vs the Clausura 2010 winner

Bicentenario 2010 winner

2nd title

=== Top goalscorers ===
Rank	Player	Club	Goals
1	(Argentina) Carlos Casartelli	León	8
2	(Mexico) Raúl Enríquez	Tijuana	7
3	(Argentina) Ariel González	Irapuato	6
3	(Argentina) Mauro Gerk	Tijuana	6
5	(Uruguay) Nelson Maz	Necaxa	5
5	(Mexico) Pablo Bonells	Pumas Morelos	5
5	(Mexico) Luis Orozco	León	5
5	(Mexico) Rafael Murguía	La Piedad	5
Source: FeMexFut

== Campeón de Ascenso 2010 ==
Nacaxa were champions of Apertura 2009 and Bicentenario 2010 tournaments, automatically winning the Campeón de Ascenso and gained the promotion to Primera División.

== Relegation table ==
Relegation is determined by a quotient of the total points earned in the Liga de Ascenso divided by the total number of games played over the past three seasons of the Liga de Ascenso (for clubs that have not been the Liga de Ascenso all three season, the last consecutive seasons of participation are taken into account). The club with the lowest quotient is relegated to the Segunda División Profesional for the next season.

Pos.	Club	Total Points	Total Games	Ave.
1	Necaxa	47	25	1.8800
2	León	170	92	1.8478
3	Tijuana	107	58	1.8448
4	Veracruz	97	57	1.7018
5	Dorados de Sinaloa	153	91	1.6813
6	Irapuato	94	57	1.6491
7	Lobos BUAP	147	92	1.5978
8	Cruz Azul Hidalgo	141	91	1.5495
9	Correcaminos	144	93	1.5484
10	Pumas Morelos	136	92	1.4783
11	Mérida	132	91	1.4505
12	Durango	122	91	1.3407
13	Orizaba	117	92	1.2717
13	La Piedad	117	92	1.2717
15	Potros Neza	59	57	1.0351
16	U. de G.	94	92	1.0217
17	Guerreros	81	91	0.8901 *

Eligible for relegation to Segunda División Profesional. There was no relegation after the 2009–10 season.
