= Sebastián Maz =

Uruguayan footballer (born 1984)

Personal information
- Full name: Nelson Sebastián Maz Rosano
- Date of birth: 20 November 1984 (age 41)
- Place of birth: Durazno, Uruguay
- Height: 1.77 m (5 ft 10 in)
- Position: Striker

Senior career*
Years	Team	Apps	(Gls)
2004–2006	Peñarol	12	(3)
2006	Central Español	9	(1)
2007	Montevideo Wanderers	11	(2)
2007–2010	Indios	47	(22)
2009	Dorados	18	(15)
2009–2010	Necaxa	42	(23)
2010–2011	Veracruz	26	(12)
2011–2014	León	75	(37)
2015	→ Mineros (loan)	10	(1)
2015–2016	FC Juárez	10	(2)
2017	Celaya	2	(0)

Managerial career
- 2019–2020: León Reserves and Academy
- 2021–2022: León (assistant)
- 2022–2023: León Reserves and Academy
- 2024–2025: León (assistant)
- 2026: UAT (assistant)
- * Club domestic league appearances and goals

Nelson Sebastián Maz Rosano (born 20 November 1984 in Durazno) is a Uruguayan football coach and former player who played as a striker.

== Honours ==
Necaxa

- Liga de Ascenso: Apertura 2009, Bicentenario 2010

León

- Liga de Ascenso: Clausura 2012
- Liga MX: Apertura 2013
