= Jesús Mendoza =

Mexican footballer (born 1979)

Personal information
- Full name: José de Jesús Mendoza Magaña
- Date of birth: 10 January 1979 (age 47)
- Place of birth: Mexico City, Mexico
- Height: 1.78 m (5 ft 10 in)
- Position: Left winger

Senior career*
Years	Team	Apps	(Gls)
1997–1999	Club León	27	(2)
1999–2000	Chivas de Guadalajara	33	(10)
2000–2002	Club América	74	(9)
2003	C.F. Monterrey	14	(3)
2003–2005	Club América	69	(4)
2005–2010	San Luis F.C.	19	
2006	→ Atlante F.C. (loan)	8	
2007	→ Tampico Madero (loan)	5	
2008–2009	→ C.F. La Piedad (loan)	31	(6)
2009–2010	→ Club Necaxa (loan)	25	(2)
2010	→ Tiburones Rojos de Veracruz (loan)	5	(0)
2011	C.F. La Piedad	8	(2)
2011–2012	Club Celaya	8	(1)

International career
1998–2004	Mexico	11	(1)
Medal record
Men's association football
Representing Mexico
Pan American Games
Gold medal – first place	1999 Winnipeg	Team competition
- * Club domestic league appearances and goals

José de Jesús Mendoza Magaña (born 10 January 1979) is a Mexican former football striker.

== Club career ==
Mendoza debuted in the Verano 1997 season with León against Cruz Azul. Mendoza did not receive much playing time until the Invierno 1998 season. For the Invierno 1999 season, Mendoza was transferred to Chivas de Guadalajara. Mendoza played two seasons with Chivas in which he made 33 appearances and scored 10 goals.

When the Invierno 2000 season came, Mendoza was sold to bitter rival Club América. Mendoza won the first championship in his career in the Verano 2002 season with America. Mendoza was sent to Monterrey before the Clausra 2003 season started. Despite playing infrequently during the Clausura 2003, Mendoza won the second championship of his career, this time with Monterrey.

Mendoza was sent back to America for the Apertura 2003 season and has not left since. Mendoza won his third championship during the Clausura 2005 with America. Prior to the Apertura 2005 season, Mendoza was transferred to San Luis F.C.

== Honours ==
América

- Mexican Primera División: Verano 2002, Clausura 2005

Monterrey

- Mexican Primera División: Clausura 2003

Necaxa

- Liga de Ascenso: Apertura 2009, Bicentenario 2010
- Campeón de Ascenso: 2009–10
