= Bernardo Sainz =

Mexican footballer (born 1985)

Bernardo Sainz Gallo
Personal information
- Full name: Bernardo Sainz Gallo
- Date of birth: 15 April 1985 (age 41)
- Place of birth: Mexico City, Mexico
- Height: 1.68 m (5 ft 6 in)
- Position: Forward

Youth career
- 2001–2003: Monarcas Morelia

Senior career*
Years	Team	Apps	(Gls)
2004–2007	Monarcas Morelia	1	(0)
2005	→ Alacranes de Durango	1	(0)
2005	→ Dorados de Sinaloa (loan)	10	(2)
2006	→ Club Tijuana (loan)	1	(0)
2006	→ Dorados de Sinaloa (loan)	12	(1)
2007–2008	Estudiantes Tecos	10	(1)
2008–2010	Mérida F.C.	33	(5)
2010–2012	Toros Neza	38	(5)
2012 – 2013	Puebla F.C.	1	(0)
- * Club domestic league appearances and goals as of 22 September 2012

Bernardo Sainz Gallo (born April 15, 1985) is a former Mexican footballer who last played for Pumas Morelos in the Ascenso MX.

== Career ==
He began his career 2007 with Monarcas Morelia but was later sent on loan to second-division clubs Alacranes de Durango, Dorados de Sinaloa and Club Tijuana. In 2008, he finally managed to get consistent play in the first division with Estudiantes Tecos but was once again sent down to the inferior divisions in 2009, playing for Mérida F.C. and Toros Neza. In 2012, he was sent on loan with first division club Puebla F.C. but is mainly used in the Copa Mexico.

== Personal life ==
Bernardo Sainz has 2 brothers and one sister Inés Sainz who is a famous Mexican sport journalist.
