= Salvador Vázquez =

Mexican footballer (born 1985)

Personal information
- Full name: Salvador Vázquez Ramos
- Date of birth: 8 May 1985 (age 41)
- Place of birth: Coquimatlán, Colima, Mexico
- Height: 1.72 m (5 ft 8 in)
- Position: Midfielder

Senior career*
Years	Team	Apps	(Gls)
2006–2008	Real Colima	55	(1)
2009	Potros Chetumal	7	(1)
2009	Atlante F.C.	1	(0)
2009–2010	Guerreros de Hermosillo	24	(1)
2010–2011	Cruz Azul Hidalgo	3	(0)
- * Club domestic league appearances and goals as of March 5, 2009

Salvador Vázquez Ramos (born 8 May 1985) is a Mexican former footballer, who last played as a midfielder for Cruz Azul Hidalgo, in Liga de Ascenso.

Salvador began his career in his home state of Colima, with the Atlante former filial Pegaso Real de Colima. It later became Real Colima. He has also split time at Atlante's current filial, Potros Chetumal.

He made his professional debut on 8 February 2009 in a 1–1 tie with UANL Tigres.
