= Gastón Otreras =

Argentine footballer

Personal information
- Full name: Óscar Gastón Otreras
- Date of birth: 24 August 1985 (age 41)
- Place of birth: Quilmes, Argentina
- Height: 1.73 m (5 ft 8 in)
- Position: Midfielder

Youth career
- Boca Juniors

Senior career*
Years	Team	Apps	(Gls)
2006–2007	Huracán TA	23	(2)
2007–2008	Central Español	28	(2)
2008–2012	Tijuana	99	(7)
2011	→ Bella Vista (loan)	15	(1)
2012	→ La Piedad (loan)	7	(0)
2012	Central Español	5	(0)
2013	Aldosivi	8	(0)
2013–2014	Juventud Las Piedras	12	(4)
2015	CA Fénix	14	(0)
- * Club domestic league appearances and goals

Gastón Otreras (born August 24, 1985, in Buenos Aires, Argentina) is an Argentine retired footballer.

== Career ==
Otreras is a graduate of Boca Juniors, but was unable to break into the first team. His professional career started in 2006, playing with Argentine Second Division club Huracán de Tres Arroyos. In Summer 2007, after Huracán dropped to the Third Division, Otreras moved to Uruguayan side Central Español, a team based in the capital city, Montevideo. During the season spent in Uruguay, he played 28 matches in the Uruguayan Primera División (22 in the starting line), scoring 2 goals and finishing 13th in the aggregate table.

In July 2008, he was signed by the Mexican side Club Tijuana playing in the Liga de Ascenso. He won the 2010 Apertura, and later in 2011 achieved the promotion with his team to the Mexican Primera División. Immediately after promotion of Tijuana to the first division, Otreras signed a loan deal with Uruguayan side Bella Vista. After only six months, however, he returned to Mexico, where he joined Second Division side C.F. La Piedad.

In August 2012, he signed a new deal and agreed to return to Central Español.
