= Diego Torres (footballer, born 1979) =

Mexican footballer and manager

Personal information
- Full name: Diego Alejandro Torres Ortiz González
- Date of birth: 27 October 1979 (age 47)
- Place of birth: Aguascalientes, Mexico
- Height: 1.72 m (5 ft 8 in)
- Position: Forward

Team information
- Current team: Orlando City SC (Assistant)

Senior career*
Years	Team	Apps	(Gls)
1998–1999	Tecos F.C.	2	(0)
2002	Club Atlético Cihuatlán	22	(13)
2003	Trotamundos Tijuana	10	(4)
2003	Veracruz	7	(0)
2004	Delfines de Coatzacoalcos	34	(5)
2005	Querétaro FC	26	(1)
2006	Guerreros de Tabasco	16	(5)
2006–2009	Club Tijuana	68	(14)
Total		211	(42)

Managerial career
- 2010–2012: Tijuana Reserves and Academy
- 2012: Dorados de Sinaloa (Assistant)
- 2013–2014: Tijuana Reserves and Academy
- 2014: Dorados de Sinaloa (Assistant)
- 2014: Dorados de Sinaloa
- 2015–2017: Tijuana Reserves and Academy
- 2017: Club Tijuana (Interim)
- 2018: Dorados de Sinaloa (Assistant)
- 2019–2020: Club Tijuana (Assistant)
- 2020–: Orlando City SC (Assistant)
- * Club domestic league appearances and goals

Diego Alejandro Torres Ortiz González (born October 27, 1979) is a Mexican association football manager and former player who is currently an assistant coach for Major League Soccer side Orlando City SC.

He spent most of his professional career with Club Tijuana, making 68 appearances and scoring 14 goals. He also represented Guerros de Tabasco, Queretaro FC, Delfines de Coatzacoalcos, Veracruz, Trotamundos Tijuana, Club Atletico Cihuatlan, and Tecos F.C.

Torres was appointed as assistant coach for Orlando City SC prior to the 2020 Major League Soccer season after over a decade spent at Club Tijuana in various roles, where he worked with Oscar Pareja in 2019.

Torres was appointed interim manager for Club Tijuana on October 31, 2017, following the departure of Eduardo Coudet.
