= Jonathan Tridente =

Argentine footballer

Personal information
- Full name: Jonathan Pablo Tridente
- Date of birth: 23 March 1983 (age 43)
- Place of birth: Avellaneda, Argentina
- Position: Forward

Senior career*
Years	Team	Apps	(Gls)
2008–2009	Querétaro FC	19	(6)
2009–2010	Atenas de San Carlos	9	(0)
2010–2011	Los Andes		
2011–2012	Leones Negros UdeG	9	(0)
2012–2013	Brown de Adrogué	30	(5)
2013–2014	Defensores de Belgrano	33	(3)
2014–2015	Brown de Adrogué	23	(1)
- * Club domestic league appearances and goals

Jonathan Pablo Tridente (born 23 March 1983) is an Argentine former footballer.
