= Guerreros de Hermosillo F.C. =

Guerreros
- Full name: Guerreros de Hermosillo Fútbol Club
- Nickname: Guarreros
- Founded: 28 July 2009
- Dissolved: 23 December 2010
- Ground: Estadio Héroe de Nacozari, Hermosillo
- Capacity: 22,000
- Chairman: (Mexico)
- Manager: (Mexico) José Treviño
- League: Liga de Ascenso
Away colours	Third colours

Guerreros de Hermosillo Fútbol Club were a Mexican football team who played in Hermosillo in the state of Sonora.

== History ==
The Guerreros de Hermosillo purchased the rights of Real Colima to play in the Liga de Ascenso, becoming the fourth team from Sonora to play in the second-tier league. The club was presented on 28 July 2009 and debuted four days later in a 2–0 defeat to the Dorados de Sinaloa. Salvador Vázquez scored the first goal in club history in their fifth match. Their first manager, Gastón Obledo, was sacked after eight matches and replaced by Santiago Ostolaza.

In the 2010 Apertura season, manager José Treviño led the Guerreros to their best season, a ninth-place finish, missing out on the Liguilla playoffs by goal difference. This was in spite of the fact that they were forced to play their home fixtures in alternating cities due to improvements to the Estadio Héroe de Nacozari. The Guerreros defeated the

On 23 December 2010, the secretary-general of the Liga de Ascenso announced that the Guerreros de Hermosillo were being disaffiliated due to financial issues and non-compliance with league requirements. Thus, the club lasted one and a half seasons in the Liga de Ascenso before disappearing between the Apertura and the Clausura of the 2010–2011 season. No team took their place, and the 2011 Clausura season was played with 17 teams.

== Managers ==
- (Mexico) Gastón Obledo (2009)
- (Uruguay) Santiago Ostolaza (2009)
- (Mexico) Marcelino Bernal (2010)
- (Mexico) José Treviño (2010–2011)

== Year-by-year ==
Season	Division	League	Position
Apertura 2009	2	Liga de Ascenso	17th
Bicentenario 2010	2	Liga de Ascenso	17th
