= Eder Pacheco =

Brazilian footballer (born 1977)

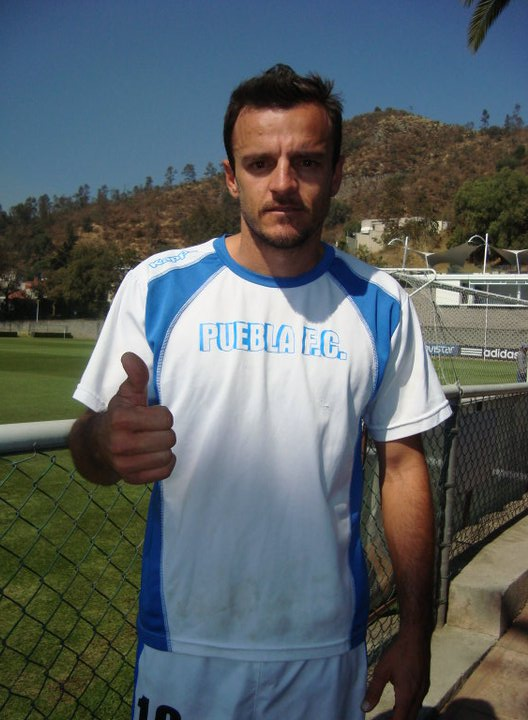

Personal information
- Full name: Eder Pacheco Ferreira
- Date of birth: 23 July 1977 (age 49)
- Place of birth: Dois Vizinhos, Brazil
- Height: 1.80 m (5 ft 11 in)
- Position: Striker

Senior career*
Years	Team	Apps	(Gls)
2006	Tien Giang		
2007	Mérida F.C.	14	(5)
2007–2008	Morelia	1	(0)
2008	Mérida F.C.	13	(3)
2008	Lobos de la BUAP	4	(1)
2009–2014	Puebla F.C.	4	(1)
2009–2010	→Lobos de la BUAP (loan)	33	(9)
2010	→Durango (loan)	11	(8)
2011	→Veracruz (loan)	14	(5)
2011–2012	→León (loan)	29	(16)
2012–2014	Correcaminos UAT	45	(14)
2014–2015	→Tepic (loan)	4	(2)
- * Club domestic league appearances and goals as of 9 June 2011

Eder Pacheco Ferreira (born 23 July 1977) is a Brazilian former professional footballer who played as a striker. He is a Mexican naturalized citizen.

== Club career ==
Pacheco is a naturalized Mexican who has played most of his professional career in the Ascenso MX in Mexico.

== Honors ==
=== Club ===
León

- Ascenso MX: Clausura 2012

=== Individual ===
- Ascenso MX Top Scorer: Apertura 2010
