= Pepe Cruz =

Mexican footballer (born 1982)

Personal information
- Full name: José Cruz Gutiérrez Flores
- Date of birth: 10 June 1982 (age 44)
- Place of birth: Guadalajara, Jalisco, Mexico
- Height: 1.72 m (5 ft 8 in)
- Position: Striker

Senior career*
Years	Team	Apps	(Gls)
2002–2003	Monterrey	14	(0)
2007–2008	Monterrey B	39	(15)
2008	Indios de Chihuahua	16	(9)
2009–2012	Irapuato	77	(24)
2012–2013	Lobos BUAP	8	(1)
2013–2014	U. de G.	4	(0)
2014	Correcaminos		
2015	Zacatepec		
- * Club domestic league appearances and goals as of 17:18, 12 January 2016 (UTC)

José Cruz Gutiérrez Flores (born June 10, 1982), known as Pepe Cruz, is a former Mexican professional footballer who played in Liga MX with Monterrey.

== Career ==
Cruz began his football career with C.F. Monterrey, making his Mexican Primera División debut with Rayados in 2002. He only made fourteen appearances during his three years with the club, eventually dropping down to play for Indios de Chihuahua in the Primera A División during 2008. He led Indios by scoring nine goals in the Apertura 2008 tournament, leading the parent club's manager, Héctor Hugo Eugui, to consider signing him for the Clausura 2009 season.

Cruz joined Club Universidad de Guadalajara in 2013, and helped Leones Negros gain promotion from Ascenso MX in 2014. However, he would join Correcaminos UAT and stay in Ascenso MX for the following tournament.

== Honors ==
=== Club ===
Irapuato

- Liga de Ascenso: Clausura 2011
