= Pablo Bonells =

Mexican footballer (born 1985)

Personal information
- Full name: Pablo Bonells Mendoza
- Date of birth: 9 September 1985 (age 41)
- Place of birth: Mexico D.F., Mexico
- Height: 1.77 m (5 ft 9 1/2 in)
- Position: Forward

Youth career
- 1998–2005: UNAM

Senior career*
Years	Team	Apps	(Gls)
2005–2013	UNAM Pumas	18	(1)
2010–2011	→ León (loan)	22	(7)
2011–2012	→ Querétaro (loan)	5	(0)
2012	→ Celaya (loan)	7	(4)
2013	Puebla	2	(0)
- * Club domestic league appearances and goals

Pablo Bonells Mendoza (born 9 September 1985) is a Mexican former footballer.

He joined the UNAM Pumas youth system at the age of 13, working his way through the ranks to make his first division debut in 2005.
