= Nicolás Saucedo =

Argentine footballer (born 1982)

Personal information
- Full name: Roberto Nicolás Saucedo
- Date of birth: 8 January 1982 (age 44)
- Place of birth: Santa Fe, Argentina
- Height: 1.84 m (6 ft 0 in)
- Position: Striker

Youth career
- Newell's Old Boys

Senior career*
Years	Team	Apps	(Gls)
2000–2003	Newell's Old Boys	19	(1)
2001–2002	→ Deportes La Serena (loan)		
2003–2004	Aurora	38	(14)
2004–2005	Mérida	35	(11)
2005–2007	Indios	65	(18)
2006	Pachuca	–	(–)
2007	Argentinos Juniors	3	(0)
2008	UA Maracaibo	8	(3)
2008–2013	Mérida	34	(6)
2009–2010	→ Irapuato (loan)	30	(11)
2010–2013	→ Correcaminos UAT (loan)	97	(33)
2013–2017	Correcaminos UAT	70	(21)
2015–2016	→ Toluca (loan)	12	(1)
- * Club domestic league appearances and goals

Roberto Nicolás Saucedo (born January 8, 1982, in Santa Fe, Argentina), known as Nicolás Saucedo, is a former Argentine footballer who played as a striker. He is a naturalized citizen of Mexico.

== Career ==
- (Argentina) Newell's Old Boys 2000–2003
- (Chile) Deportes La Serena 2001–2002
- (Bolivia) Aurora 2003–2004
- (Mexico) Mérida 2004–2005
- (Mexico) Indios de Ciudad Juárez 2005–2007
- (Mexico) Pachuca 2006
- (Argentina) Argentinos Juniors 2007
- (Venezuela) Unión Atlético Maracaibo 2008
- (Mexico) Mérida 2008–2013
- (Mexico) Irapuato 2009–2010
- (Mexico) Correcaminos UAT 2010–2017
- (Mexico) Toluca 2015–2016

== Honours ==
- Mérida FC 2009 (Torneo Clausura Liga de Ascenso)
- UAT (Torneo Apertura 2011)
