= Estadio Héroe de Nacozari =

Stadium in Hermosillo, Sonora, Mexico

Coordinates: 29°6′27.70″N 110°59′44.75″W

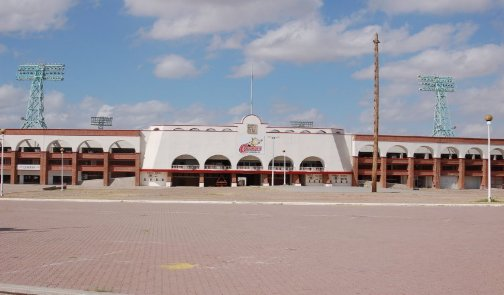
- Interactive map of Estadio Héroe de Nacozari
- Location: Hermosillo, Sonora, Mexico
- Capacity: 18,747
- Surface: Synthetic grass
- Field size: 106 x 67 m

Construction
- Opened: 5 August 1985

Tenants
- Gallos Blancos de Hermosillo (1995–96; Ascenso MX); Coyotes de Sonora (2005–06; Ascenso MX); Buhos de Hermosillo (2005–11; Segunda Division); Guerreros de Hermosillo F.C. (2009–10; Ascenso MX); Cimarrones de Sonora (2013–15; Liga Premier); Cimarrones de Sonora (2015–; Ascenso MX)

Estadio Héroe de Nacozari is a multi-use stadium in Hermosillo, Sonora, Mexico. It is currently used mostly for football matches and is the home stadium of the Cimarrones de Sonora of the Ascenso MX. The stadium holds 18,747 people.

The name Héroe de Nacozari ("Hero of Nacozari") honors Hermosillo native Jesús García who, in 1907, saved the city of Nacozari, Sonora, from destruction by a fire aboard a dynamite train.

The stadium was opened on 4 August 1985. On 6 December 1995, the Mexico national football team played a friendly match against Slovenia in this stadium.
