= Jonathan Piña =

Mexican footballer (born 1989)

José Piña
Personal information
- Full name: José Jonathan Piña Gutiérrez
- Date of birth: 16 June 1989 (age 37)
- Place of birth: Aguascalientes, Aguascalientes, Mexico
- Height: 1.67 m (5 ft 6 in)
- Position: Midfielder

Senior career*
Years	Team	Apps	(Gls)
2006–2011	Atlas	17	(2)
2007	→ Quéretaro (loan)	8	(1)
2009–2010	→ Quéretaro (loan)	12	(1)
2010–2011	→ Leones Negros (loan)	20	(1)
2012	La Piedad	11	(0)
- * Club domestic league appearances and goals as of 14 January 2010

José Jonathan Piña Gutierrez (Note: In this Spanish name, the first or paternal surname is Piña and the second or maternal family name is Gutierrez.) (born 16 June 1989) is a former Mexican football midfielder who played for C.F. La Piedad. He previously played for Club Atlas, and for Querétaro in the Primera Division de Mexico.
