= Pedro Beltrán (footballer) =

Mexican footballer (born 1988)

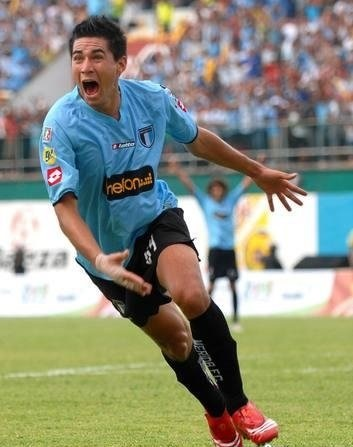

Personal information
- Full name: Pedro Luis Beltrán García
- Date of birth: June 29, 1988 (age 38)
- Place of birth: Culiacán, Sinaloa, Mexico
- Height: 1.76 m (5 ft 9 in)
- Position: Midfielder

Senior career*
Years	Team	Apps	(Gls)
2006–2010	Atlético Morelia		
2010–2011	Atlante		
2014–2015	Alebrijes de Oaxaca		
2015–2016	Murciélagos F.C.		
- * Club domestic league appearances and goals

Pedro Luis Beltrán García (born June 29, 1988) is a Mexican former professional footballer who played as a midfielder.
