= Estadio Centenario (Cuernavaca) =

Football stadium in Cuernavaca, Mexico

Coordinates: 18°58′14″N 99°14′48″W

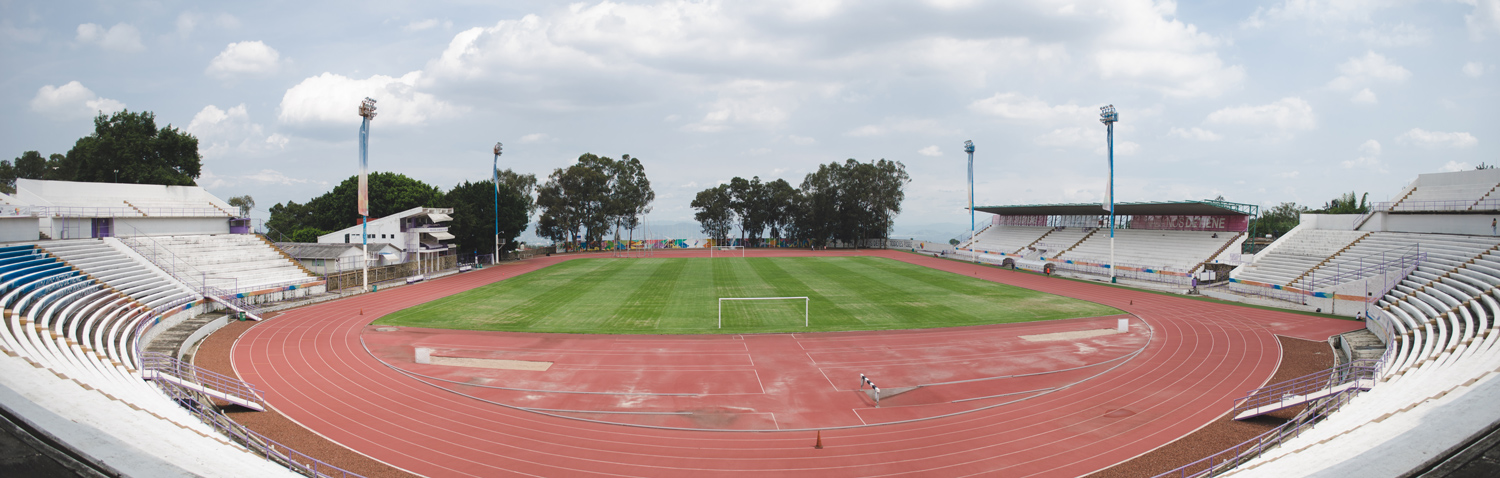
- Centenario Stadium in Cuernavaca.
- Interactive map of Estadio Centenario
- Capacity: 9,670
- Surface: Grass

Construction
- Opened: 1969
- Renovated: 2009

Tenants
- Pumas Morelos (2006–2013); Zacatepec (2013–14); Ballenas Galeana (2013–14); Athletic Morelos (2014–2017); Halcones de Morelos (2017–2018); Escorpiones F.C. (2021–2023); Cruz Azul (women) (2026–present)

The Estadio Centenario is a multi-purpose stadium in Cuernavaca, Mexico. Its primary current use is for football matches. The stadium has a capacity of 9,670 people and was opened in 1969 and renovated in 2009.
