= Diego Olsina =

Argentine footballer (born 1978)

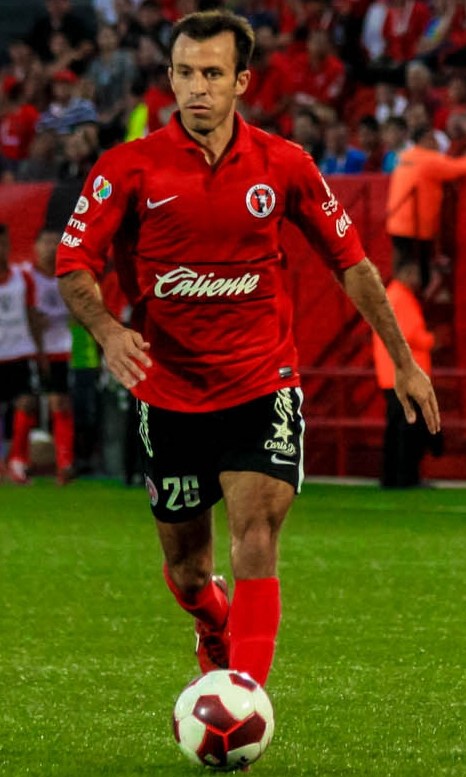
Olsina in 2012

Diego Alberto Olsina (born 22 April 1978) is an Argentine former professional footballer who played as a midfielder.
