= Raúl Enríquez =

Mexican footballer (born 1985)

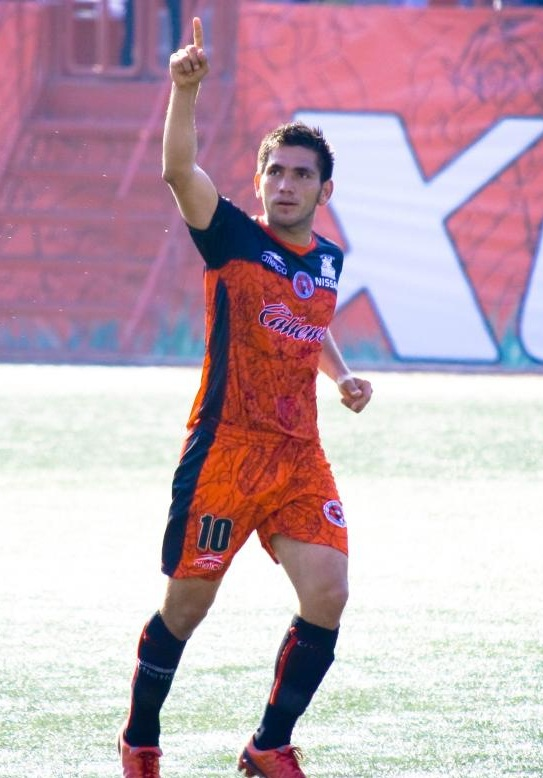
- Enríquez playing for Tijuana

Personal information
- Full name: Raúl Enríquez Arámbula
- Date of birth: 20 May 1985 (age 41)
- Place of birth: Armeria, Colima, Mexico
- Height: 1.78 m (5 ft 10 in)
- Position: Forward

Senior career*
Years	Team	Apps	(Gls)
2005–2006	Chiapas	11	(0)
2006–2007	Petroleros	54	(26)
2007–2013	Tijuana	190	(81)
2013–2015	Sinaloa	39	(15)
2016	Zacatecas	22	(2)
2016–2018	FC Juárez	34	(0)
2020	Halcones de Zapopan	0	(0)
- * Club domestic league appearances and goals as of 15 April 2017

Raúl Enríquez Arámbula (born 20 May 1985) is a Mexican former professional footballer who played as a forward. He is Club Tijuana's all-time leading scorer.

== Career ==
In 2007, Enríquez signed for second division side Club Tijuana. Enríquez quickly became an integral member of the first-team, being the club's first-choice striker. During the 2010 Apertura, he helped the club gain promotion to the first division as Tijuana finished in first place in the regular campaign before defeating Veracruz 3–0 in the two-legged Liguilla final. Two years later, Enríquez was lifting another league title with Tijuana, this time the Liga MX Apertura. He remains the club's all-time top goalscorer with 81 goals.

In 2013, Enríquez was loaned to Dorados de Sinaloa after six years with Tijuana; however, he returned to Tijuana after playing two matches with Sinaloa. After being loaned over the last two seasons, Raul was loaned to Juarez where he scored 19 goals and was the joint scorer in the league. He was link with clubs giant like Loros and Tampico Maderos, but he chose to stay with Juarez as his dream is to play with Tijuana again.

== Personal life ==
On 12 September 2022, Enríquez was arrested at the Otay Mesa, San Diego, California checkpoint for allegedly trying to smuggle two undocumented individuals in the truck he was driving. He was reportedly driving a Cadillac pickup truck on his way to a game in Santa Ana, but was questioned by an agent when attempting to cross the border line, according to documents filed with the United States District Court for the Southern District of California.

== Honours ==
Tijuana

- Liga MX: Apertura 2012
- Ascenso MX: Apertura 2010

Dorados de Sinaloa

- Ascenso MX: Clausura 2015

Individual

- Top goalscorer: Primera A Apertura 2008, Copa MX Clausura 2015
