= Indios de Ciudad Juárez Reserves =

Indios Reserves
- Full name: Indios de Ciudad Juárez Reserves
- Nicknames: Los Indios, La Tribu
- Founded: 2008
- Dissolved: June 2009
- Ground: Estadio Complejo Yvasa, Ciudad Juárez, Chihuahua
- Capacity: 1,000
Home colours	Away colours

Indios de Ciudad Juárez Reserves was a Mexican football club who was founded in 2008 that played Primera Divisíon A during the 2008/09 season and later dissolved in June of 2009

== See also ==
- Indios de Ciudad Juárez
