= Mauro Gerk =

Argentine footballer

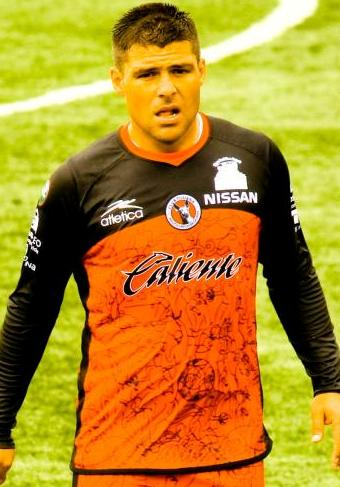
- Gerk with Tijuana in 2010

Personal information
- Full name: Mauro Néstor Gerk
- Date of birth: 9 May 1977 (age 49)
- Place of birth: Buenos Aires, Argentina
- Height: 1.80 m (5 ft 11 in)
- Position: Striker

Senior career*
| Years | Team | Apps | (Gls) |
| 2003–2005 | Celaya | 71 | (3) |
| 2005–2009 | Querétaro | 116 | (62) |
| 2010–2012 | Tijuana | 74 | (20) |
| 2012–2013 | Cruz Azul Hidalgo | 6 | (0) |

Managerial career
- 2018: Tijuana (Assistant)
- 2019–2021: Racing Club (Reserves)
- 2022: Defensa y Justicia (Reserves)
- 2022–2024: Querétaro
- * Club domestic league appearances and goals

Mauro Néstor Gerk also known as El Tanque or El delantero del amor (born 9 May 1977), is an Argentine football manager and former striker.

== Career ==
Gerk played several seasons with Querétaro, becoming a fan favorite before moving to Tijuana. He made his first appearance with Querétaro against Monterrey in the Apertura 2006.

== Honours ==
- Primera A Top Goalscorer: Apertura 2008
- Trofeo Bravo 2008
