= Luis Orozco =

Mexican footballer (born 1984)

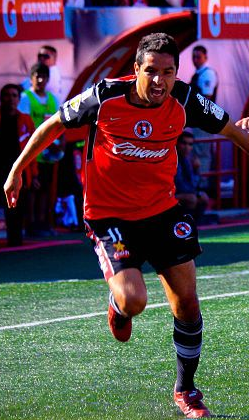

Personal information
- Full name: Luis Alberto Orozco Peñuelas
- Date of birth: 1 March 1984 (age 42)
- Place of birth: Los Mochis, Sinaloa, Mexico
- Height: 1.84 m (6 ft 0 in)
- Position: Striker

Team information
- Current team: Dorados de Sinaloa (manager)

Senior career*
Years	Team	Apps	(Gls)
2003–2008	Cruz Azul	28	(1)
2008	→ Morelia (loan)	11	(0)
2008–2010	Mérida	42	(16)
2009–2010	→ Club León (loan)	34	(15)
2010–2014	Tijuana	44	(6)
2012	→ La Piedad (loan)	13	(3)
2012	→ Veracruz (loan)	11	(3)
2013	→ Correcaminos UAT (loan)	6	(0)
2013–2014	→ Dorados de Sinaloa (loan)	6	(3)

Managerial career
- 2016–2017: Monarcas Morelia Premier (assistant)
- 2017–2019: Monarcas Morelia Reserves and Academy
- 2019–2020: Monarcas Morelia (assistant)
- 2020–2021: Mazatlán (assistant)
- 2021–2022: Cruz Azul Reserves and Academy
- 2022–2023: Peru (assistant)
- 2024: Juárez (assistant)
- 2024–2025: Tlaxcala
- 2025–2026: Pérez Zeledón
- 2026–: Dorados de Sinaloa
- * Club domestic league appearances and goals

Luis Alberto Orozco Peñuelas (born 1 March 1984) is a Mexican football coach and a former player. He is the manager of Mexican club Dorados de Sinaloa.
