= Estadio Carlos Iturralde =

Multi-use stadium in Mérida, Mexico

Estadio Carlos Iturralde Rivero
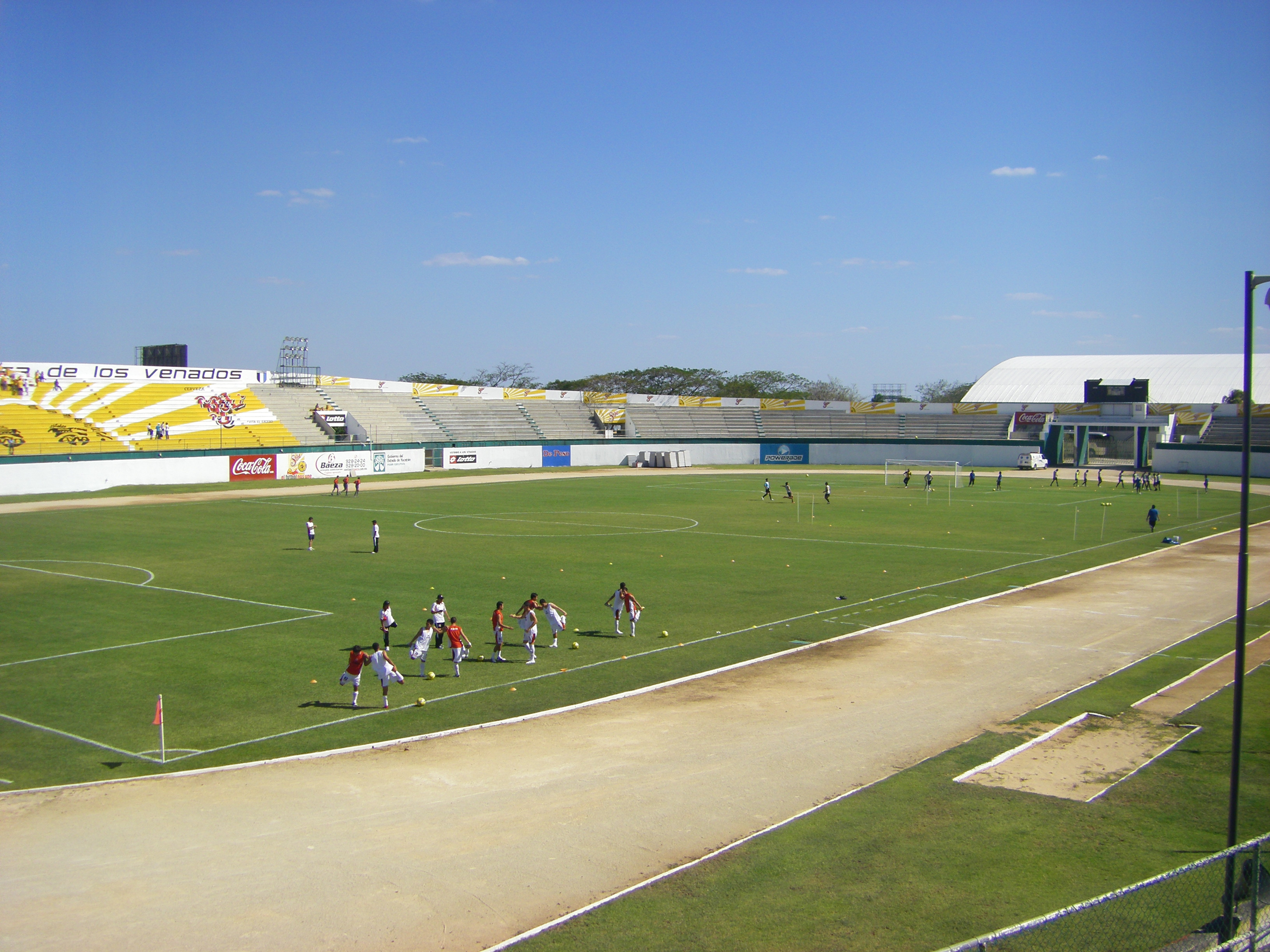
- Interactive map of Estadio Carlos Iturralde Rivero
- Location: Mérida, Yucatán
- Coordinates: 20°56′45″N 89°35′37″W
- Capacity: 15,087
- Surface: grass
- Field size: 103 x 82 m

Construction
- Opened: 1987

Tenant
- Venados

The Estadio Carlos Iturralde is a multi-use stadium in the Mexican city of Mérida, Yucatán. It is currently used mostly for football matches and is the home stadium of Venados F.C. The stadium holds 15,087 people.

== History ==
The stadium received the name Carlos Iturralde Rivero in honor of the Yucatecan football player who played in the Mexico national football team. The first goal scored in the history of the stadium was from the Yucatecan Alonso Diego Molina, a former player of the school Modelo.

There were plans to construct a new stadium in Ucú, a suburb of Mérida. The new stadium, was scheduled to begin construction in January 2009 and planned for completion in 2011, and would have had a capacity of 28,500 people.
