= Indios de Ciudad Juárez =

- Full name: Club de Fútbol Indios de Ciudad Juárez
- Nicknames: Los Indios (The Indians); La Tribu (The Tribe)
- Founded: 8 March 2005; 21 years ago
- Dissolved: 31 December 2011; 14 years ago
- Ground: Estadio Olímpico Benito Juárez, Ciudad Juárez, Chihuahua, Mexico
- Capacity: 19,765
Home colours	Away colours	Third colours

Club de Fútbol Indios de Ciudad Juárez, commonly referred as Indios de Ciudad Juárez or simply Indios, was a Mexican football club. Founded in 2005 when Pachuca moved its Pachuca Juniors franchise to Ciudad Juárez, Chihuahua, it was promoted to the Primera División de México after the 2007–2008 season, with Pachuca divesting its shares upon promotion. However, the team was relegated back to the Liga de Ascenso de México following the 2010 Clausura and folded in 2011.

== Overview ==
Indios when they were champions of Apertura 2007

Indios when they promoted to Primera División

During its time in Mexico's second-tier football league, Indios enjoyed much success in the Primera División 'A' de México.

In Clausura 2006, Indios played in the league final and lost to Querétaro on penalty kicks, narrowly missing promotion.

In Apertura 2006, Indios led a part of the competition with Jair García as the second-best scorer in the league. However, Indios lost in the quarterfinals. Puebla would go on to beat Petroleros de Salamanca for the title and later would win promotion to the Primera División de México with a victory over Dorados de Sinaloa.

On December 12, 2007, the first leg of the Apertura 2007 final took place in Ciudad Juárez, Chihuahua, where Indios defeated Dorados, 3–0. The second leg took place December 15, 2007, in Culiacán, Sinaloa, where Indios defeated Dorados 4-0. This game made Indios league champions for the first time and clinched a spot in the promotion series. León took the Clausura 2008 title, setting up a two-legged "Final de Ascenso" to decide promotion. Indios won the first leg, 1–0, at home on May 22 and earned a 2–2 draw at León, Guanajuato on May 25, giving them a 3–2 aggregate victory and promotion to the Primera División.

The club's first season in the Primera División de México began with the Apertura 2008 tournament.

=== Primera División ===
Indios de Ciudad Juárez started the Apertura 2008 poorly, losing their first four matches. After manager Sergio Orduña was fired, Héctor Hugo Eugui took over as manager and tied his first game with Toluca.

Due to Mexico's unique system of relegation, Indios were on the brink of being relegated during the Clausura 2009 tournament despite having a winning season and qualifying as 7th place for the playoffs. In the playoffs, Indios stunned 2nd-seeded, defending champion Toluca, 1–0 on aggregate before falling to top-seeded Pachuca by a 4–3 count.

In the Apertura 2009 tournament, Indios failed to win a single match, managing just six draws in seventeen matches while being outscored 26–7. Indios improved in the Torneo Bicentenario, but their four victories left them far short of safety. On April 25, 2010, Indios were relegated to the Primera División with a 2-0 victory win at home over Pumas.

=== Return to Liga de Ascenso and Disappearance ===
During the opening half of the 2010–11 Liga de Ascenso season, Juárez finished second to Club Tijuana during the classification phase. However, they were upset by Albinegros de Orizaba in the playoffs. In the Clausura season, they finished tenth and outside of playoff contention. Indios finished 13th and eight points out of the playoffs during their final season.

At the end of the 2011 season, the club had many financial problems. Femexfut announced in December 31, 2011 that the club was being disbanded.

=== Reappearance as Indios UACJ ===
After the disaffiliation of Club Indios de Ciudad Juarez, Ciudad Juárez was left without a professional soccer team. After failed attempts to maintain a team of professional soccer for this border was the UACJ, which assumed that leadership, joining other universities that have professional football teams.

Therefore, in May 2012, Francisco Javier Sánchez Carlos, rector of the UACJ, announced the integrated to the Segunda División de México of Mexican Soccer as Club de Fútbol Indios de la UACJ. Their official match was on August 18 with a 1–3 loss to Coras de Tepic correspond to Group 1 Liga Premier, which currently plays.

Indios UACJ defeated Irapuato in the Clausura 2014 Final. The match was decided by a penalty shootout, in which a save by the Indios goalkeeper secured the victory for the Juárez-based club.

Their major rival was Dorados de la UACH, for which the classic was called "El Clásico del Norte".

== Stadium ==
Indios UACJ played their home matches at the Estadio Olímpico Benito Juárez in Ciudad Juárez, Chihuahua. The stadium capacity is 23,500 people. It is owned by Universidad Autónoma de Ciudad Juárez, and its surface is natural grass. The stadium was opened in October 1980 with a match between Mexico national football team and Atlético Español.

== Managers ==
=== Indios de Ciudad Juarez ===
Name	From	To
(Mexico) Alfonso Sosa	2004	2006
(Mexico) Sergio Orduña	2006	2008
(Uruguay) Héctor Hugo Eugui	2008	2009
(Mexico) José Treviño	2009	2010
(Uruguay) César Vega	2011	2012

== Competitive record ==
Torneo	Tier	Position	Matches	Wins	Draws	Losses	GF (Note: Goals for / scored)	GA (Note: Goals against / conceded)
Apertura 2005	Primera A	6th/1st Round	19	10	2	7	29	26
Clausura 2006	Primera A	9th/Runner-Up	19	8	6	5	29	16
Apertura 2006	Primera A	5th/Quarterfinals	17	9	2	6	30	21
Clausura 2007	Primera A	12th	17	6	5	6	25	21
Apertura 2007	Primera A	6th/Champions	17	9	3	5	26	22
Clausura 2008	Primera A	9th/Promoted	17	6	8	3	27	14
Apertura 2008	Primera Division	14th	17	5	4	8	18	26
Clausura 2009	Primera Division	7th/Semifinals	17	5	8	4	21	22
Apertura 2009	Primera Division	18th	17	0	6	11	7	26
Bicentenario 2010	Primera Division	17th/Relegated	17	4	3	10	10	29
Apertura 2010	Liga de Ascenso	2nd/Quarterfinals	17	8	5	4	32	27
Clausura 2011	Liga de Ascenso	10th	16	6	2	8	14	20
Apertura 2011	Liga de Ascenso	13th	15	4	2	9	20	24
Clausura 2012	'INDIOS DE CD. JUAREZ'							
Apertura 2012	INDIOS DE CD. JUAREZ							
Apertura 2012	Liga Premier	23rd	15	2	6	7	13	23
Clausura 2013	Liga Premier	16th	15	5	4	6	17	15
Apertura 2013	Liga Premier	16th	15	6	3	6	21	19
Clausura 2014	Liga Premier	12th/Champions (Copa)	15	6	3	6	22	24
Totals	2 Titles	7/17	282	99	72	111	361	375

== Overall statistics ==
=== General statistics ===
- All-time top scorer: Julio Daniel Frías 30 goals (23 in Primera "A" / 7 in Primera División)
- Most appearances: Edwin Santibáñez with 150 matches (114 in Primera "A" / 36 in Primera División)
- Most minutes played: Edwin Santibáñez with 12,416 minutes (9, 385 in Primera "A" / 3031 in Primera División)
- Most yellow cards: Edwin Santibáñez 39 (32 in Primera "A" / 7 in Primera División)
- Most red cards: Ricardo Esqueda 4 (3 in Primera "A" / 1 in Primera División), Julio Brian Gutierrez (4)
- Most games played as captain: Edwin Santibáñez with 89 matches (55 in Primera "A" / 34 in Primera División)
- Primera "A": 2005-08 (Regular season / Repechaje / Liguilla / Juego de Ascenso)
- Primera División: 2008-09 (Regular season / Liguilla)

=== Milestone goals ===
Goal number	Date	Player	Opponent	Score	Final result
1	6 August 2005	Edwin Santibáñez	Deportivo Irapuato	0–1	2–1
100	26 November 2006	Darío Gigena	Monarcas Morelia B	0–2	0–2
200	27 August 2008	Mauricio Romero (OG)	Monarcas Morelia	0–1	0–1

== Honours ==
- Primera Division A: 1

Apertura 2007 (as Indios de Ciudad Juarez)

== See also ==
- Indios de Ciudad Juárez Reserves
