= Pumas Morelos =

Association football club in Mexico

- Full name: Pumas Morelos
- Nickname: Los Pumas (The Cougars)
- Founded: 2005
- Dissolved: 2013
- Ground: Estadio Centenario, Cuernavaca, Morelos, Mexico
- Capacity: 15,000
- Website: http://clubpumasunam.com
Home colours	Away colours

Pumas Morelos was a Mexican football club that played in the Segunda División de México and was based in Cuernavaca, Morelos. The Pumas Morelos team was affiliated to the Pumas UNAM franchise from Mexico City. The most goals scored were made by Alex Castañeda which were 36 in total. The team was bought by AMRH International Soccer alongside former players Jorge Campos and Claudio Suárez in 2012. The team continued playing in the Clausura 2013 before being dissolved as Pumas Morelos, and was later moved to Ciudad del Carmen, Campeche and renamed Delfines F.C..
