= 2011–12 Club Tijuana season =

Club Tijuana
2011–12 season
- Chairman: Jorge Alberto Hank
- Manager: Joaquin Del Olmo (May 13–Sep. 19, 2011); Antonio Mohamed (from Sep. 19, 2011)
- Stadium: Estadio Caliente
- Apertura 2011: 15th
- Clausura 2012: 6th Final Phase Quarter-finals
- Top goalscorer: League: Apertura: Dayro Moreno; José Sand (5); Clausura: José Sand (7); All: José Sand (12)
Home colours	Away colours

The 2011–12 Tijuana season was the 65th professional season of Mexico's top-flight football league. The season is split into two tournaments—the Torneo Apertura and the Torneo Clausura—each with identical formats and each contested by the same eighteen teams. Tijuana began their season on July 23, 2011, against Morelia, Tijuana play their homes games on Sundays at 12:00pm local time. This was Tijuana first season in Mexican top-flight league after defeating Irapuato in the promotion final.

== Torneo Apertura ==
=== Squad ===
Note: Flags indicate national team as defined under FIFA eligibility rules; some limited exceptions apply. Players may hold more than one non-FIFA nationality.

No.	Pos.	Nation	Player
2	DF	MEX	Miguel Ángel Valdez
3	DF	ARG	Javier Gandolfi (Captain)
4	DF	MEX	Miguel Almazán
5	DF	MEX	Joshua Abrego
6	DF	MEX	Alejandro Molina
7	MF	MEX	Leandro Augusto
8	MF	MEX	Fernando Arce (vice-captain)
9	FW	ARG	Mauro Gerk
10	FW	MEX	Raúl Enríquez
11	FW	MEX	Luis Orozco
12	GK	MEX	Sergio Vega
13	GK	MEX	Cirilo Saucedo
14	DF	MEX	Noé Maya
15	MF	USA	Joe Corona

No.	Pos.	Nation	Player
16	MF	URU	Egidio Arévalo Ríos
17	FW	COL	Dayro Moreno
18	FW	ARG	José Sand
19	GK	MEX	Adrián Zermeño
20	FW	MEX	Ismael Íñiguez
21	DF	MEX	Juan Pablo Santiago
22	DF	MEX	Juan Carlos Núñez
23	MF	MEX	Richard Ruíz
24	MF	ARG	Javier Yacuzzi
25	GK	MEX	Humberto Martínez
26	MF	MEX	Félix Ángel Ayala
27	MF	MEX	José Madueña
28	MF	MEX	Fernando Santana
29	MF	MEX	Armando Pulido

=== Regular season ===
==== Apertura 2011 results ====
July 23, 2011 Round 1	Tijuana	1 – 2	Morelia	Estadio Caliente, Tijuana
17:00	Leandro (yellow card) 26'; Corona 44'; Arce (yellow card) 90+3'	Report	Sandoval 13', (yellow card) 38'; Cabrera (yellow card) 43'; Rojas (yellow card) 80'; Sabah 84' (pen.)	Referee: Miguel Ángel Chacón

July 30, 2011 Round 2	Monterrey	4 – 2	Tijuana	Estadio Tecnológico, Monterrey
19:00	Santana 40'; Pérez 49' (pen.); Ayoví 71'; Delgado 72'	Report	Moreno 25'; Corona 29'; Arce (yellow card) 39'; Leandro (yellow card) 67'	Referee: César Arturo Ramos

September 2, 2011 Round 3	Tijuana	0 – 1	Guadalajara	Estadio Caliente, Tijuana
16:00	Sand (yellow card) 36'; Almazán (yellow card) 47'; Molina (yellow card) 61'	Report	Reynoso 39'; Torres (yellow card) 62'; Medina (yellow card) 81'	Referee: Roberto García Orozco

August 6, 2011 Round 4	Santos Laguna	1 – 3	Tijuana	Estadio Corona, Torreón
19:00	Rodríguez (yellow card) 24', (goal) 32' (pen.); Sánchez (yellow card) 55'; Baloy (yellow card) 64'; Qunitero (yellow card) 79'	Report	Arce 43'; Sand 54'; Moreno 64', (yellow card) 64'	Referee: Paul Delgadillo

August 14, 2011 Round 5	Tijuana	1 – 1	Puebla	Estadio Caliente, Tijuana
12:00	Moreno 7', (yellow card) 55'; Arévalo Ríos (yellow card) 77'; Leandro (yellow card) 79'	Report	Riascos 15'; Lucas Silva (yellow card) 76'; Cervantes (yellow card) 79'	Referee: Fernando Guerrero

August 20, 2011 Round 6	Cruz Azul	2 – 1	Tijuana	Estadio Azul, Mexico City
16:00	Perea (yellow card) 14', (goal) 48'; Ponce (yellow card) 45'; Pinto (yellow card) 45'; Villa (yellow card) 45' (yellow-red card) 77', (goal) 67'	Report	Moreno (yellow card) 15', (goal) 22'	Referee: José Alfredo Peñaloza

August 28, 2011 Round 7	Tijuana	1 – 1	Querétaro	Estadio Caliente, Tijuana
12:00	Moreno (yellow card) 9', (goal) 39'; Molina (yellow card) 19'	Report	Mena (yellow card) 23'; Martínez 33', (yellow card) 38'; Bueno (yellow card) 38'	Referee: Jorge Eduardo Gasso

September 11, 2011 Round 8	Toluca	1 – 1	Tijuana	Estadio Nemesio Díez, Toluca
12:00	Torres (yellow card) 70'; Alonso 66'	Report	Arce (yellow card) 17'; Núñez (yellow card) 31'; Gandolfi (yellow card) 63'; Leandro (yellow card) 65' (red card) 73' del Olmo (red card) 66' (manager); Sand 90+2'	Referee: Ricardo Arellano

September 18, 2011 Round 9	Tijuana	0 – 2	Estudiantes Tecos	Estadio Caliente, Tijuana
12:00	Arévalo Ríos (yellow card) 12'; Gandolfi (yellow card) 81'	Report	Lillingston (yellow card) 14'; Colace 54'; Bovaglio (yellow card) 73'; Pérez (yellow card) 84'; Sambueza (yellow card) 88'; Gómez 90+2'	Referee: Fernando Guerrero

September 25, 2011 Round 10	América	1 – 1	Tijuana	Estadio Azteca, Mexico City
16:00	Reyes (yellow card) 4'; Márquez (yellow card) 23'; Benítez 86'; Reyna (yellow card) 90+1'	Report	Yacuzzi 1', (yellow card) 58'; Sand (yellow card) 8'; Gandolfi (yellow card) 29'; Almazán (yellow card) 64'; Leandro (yellow card) 89'	Referee: Roberto García Orozco

October 2, 2011 Round 11	Tijuana	1 – 1	UANL	Estadio Caliente, Tijuana
12:00	Arévalo Ríos (yellow card) 22'; Enríquez (yellow card) 27'; Gandolfi (yellow card) 73', (goal) 88'	Report	Torres Nilo (yellow card) 21'; Toledo (yellow card) 34'; Lobos 40'; Jiménez (yellow card) 74'	Referee: Erim Ramírez

October 8, 2011 Round 12	Atlas	2 – 2	Tijuana	Estadio Jalisco, Guadalajara
20:45	Rodríguez (yellow card) 13' (yellow-red card) 62'; Jiménez 19'; Santos 90+3', (yellow card) 90+4'	Report	Sand 66', (yellow card) 90+4'; Almazán (yellow card) 48'; Gandolfi (yellow card) 50'; Molina 58'; Gerk 81'; Arce (yellow card) 85' (yellow-red card) 88'; Zemeño (yellow card) 90+5'	Referee: Juan Genaro Medrano

October 15, 2011 Round 13	Tijuana	3 – 2	Pachuca	Estadio Caliente, Tijuana
19:00	Almazán (yellow card) 42'; Íñiguez (yellow card) 43'; Enríquez 43'; Santiago 48', 68'	Report	Abrego 21' (o.g.); Borja (yellow card) 26'; Escalante (yellow card) 32'; Cejas (yellow card) 42'; Hernández 62'	Referee: Marco Antonio Rodríguez

October 22, 2011 Round 14	Atlante	1 – 1	Tijuana	Estadio Quintana Roo, Cancún
21:00	Cuevas (yellow card) 40' (yellow-red card) 89'; Rojas 60'; Venegas (yellow card) 89'; Diego (yellow card) 90+2'	Report	Lenadro (yellow card) 15'; Yacuzzi (yellow card) 34'; Sand 39'; Abrego (yellow card) 76'	Referee: Fabricio Morales

October 26, 2011 Round 15	Tijuana	2 – 0	Chiapas	Estadio Caliente, Tijuana
20:00	Sand 58'; Abrego (yellow card) 70'; Ruíz 77'	Report	Rodríguez (yellow card) 12'; Esqueda (yellow card) 45' (yellow-red card) 56'; J. Hernández (yellow card) 63'	Referee: Jorge Isaac Rojas

October 30, 2011 Round 16	Tijuana	0 – 0	San Luis	Estadio Caliente, Tijuana
12:00	Sand (yellow card) 51' (red card) 59'	Report	Alcántar (yellow card) 8'; Chiapas (yellow card) 51'; Orozco (yellow card) 88'	Referee: Paul Delgadillo

November 6, 2011 Round 17	UNAM	1 – 1	Tijuana	Estadio Olímpico Universitario, Mexico City
12:00	Cortés 10'; Palencia (yellow card) 43'	Report	Santiago (yellow card) 9', (goal) 53'	Referee: Francisco Chacón

=== Goalscorers ===
Position	Nation	Name	Goals scored
1.	(Colombia)	Dayro Moreno	5
1.	(Argentina)	José Sand	5
3.	(Mexico)	Juan Pablo Santiago	3
4.	(United States)	Joe Corona	2
5.	(Mexico)	Fernando Arce	1
5.	(Mexico)	Raúl Enríquez	1
5.	(Argentina)	Javier Gandolfi	1
5.	(Argentina)	Mauro Gerk	1
5.	(Mexico)	Richard Ruíz	1
5.	(Argentina)	Javier Yacuzzi	1
TOTAL			21

=== Results ===
==== Results summary ====
Overall								Home						Away					
Pld	W	D	L	GF	GA	GD	Pts	W	D	L	GF	GA	GD	W	D	L	GF	GA	GD
17	3	9	5	21	23	−2	18	2	4	3	9	10	−1	1	5	2	12	13	−1

Last updated: 6 November 2011.
Source: Apertura 2011 results

==== Results by round ====
Round	1	2	3	4	5	6	7	8	9	10	11	12	13	14	15	16	17
Ground	H	A	H	A	H	A	H	A	H	A	H	A	H	A	H	H	A
Result	L	L	L	W	D	L	D	D	L	D	D	D	W	D	W	D	D
Position	12	16	17	13	14	15	16	17	17	17	17	17	17	17	16	16	15

Updated to match(es) played on 6 November 2011. Source: Apertura 2011 results and mediotiempo.com
A = Away; H = Home; W = Win; D = Draw; L = Loss

== Transfers ==
=== In ===
#	Pos	Nat	Player	Age	From	Date	Notes
	DF	(United States)	Edgar Castillo	25	América	November 27, 2011	
	FW	(Colombia)	Duvier Riascos	25	Puebla	December 17, 2011	
	DF	(United States)	Greg Garza	20	(Portugal) Estoril Praia	December 18, 2011	

=== Out ===
#	Pos	Nat	Player	Age	To	Date	Notes
28	MF	(Mexico)	Fernando Santana	25	TBD	November 8, 2011	
26	MF	(Mexico)	Félix Ayala	30	TBD	November 8, 2011	
11	FW	(Mexico)	Luis Orozco	27	TBD	November 9, 2011	
24	MF	(Argentina)	Javier Yacuzzi	32	TBD	December 15, 2011	

== Torneo Clausura ==
=== Squad ===
Note: Flags indicate national team as defined under FIFA eligibility rules; some limited exceptions apply. Players may hold more than one non-FIFA nationality.

No.	Pos.	Nation	Player
2	DF	USA	Édgar Castillo
3	DF	ARG	Javier Gandolfi (Captain)
4	DF	MEX	Miguel Almazán
5	DF	MEX	Joshua Abrego
6	DF	MEX	Alejandro Molina
7	MF	BRA	Leandro Augusto
8	MF	MEX	Fernando Arce (vice-captain)
9	FW	ARG	Mauro Gerk
10	FW	MEX	Raúl Enríquez
11	FW	COL	Duvier Riascos
12	GK	MEX	Sergio Vega
13	GK	MEX	Cirilo Saucedo
14	DF	MEX	Noé Maya
15	MF	USA	Joe Corona

No.	Pos.	Nation	Player
16	MF	URU	Egidio Arévalo Ríos
18	FW	ARG	José Sand
19	GK	MEX	Adrián Zermeño
20	FW	MEX	Ismael Íñiguez
21	DF	MEX	Juan Pablo Santiago
22	DF	MEX	Juan Carlos Núñez
23	MF	MEX	Richard Ruíz
24	DF	USA	Greg Garza
25	MF	USA	Bryan de la Fuente
26	DF	MEX	Alfredo González Tahuilán
27	MF	MEX	José Madueña
28	FW	ARG	Leandro Fernández
29	MF	MEX	Armando Pulido

=== Out on loan ===
No.	Pos.	Nation	Player
-	FW	COL	Dayro Moreno (at Once Caldas)

=== Regular season ===
==== Clausura 2012 results ====
January 6, 2012 Round 1	Morelia	1 – 1	Tijuana	Estadio Morelos, Morelia
20:10	Gastélum (yellow card) 7'; Márquez 23'; Aldrete (yellow card) 45+'; Rojas (yellow card) 57'	Report	Saucedo (yellow card) 44'; Mohamed (red card) 45+' (manager); Sand 45+' (pen.); Santiago (yellow card) 49'; Arce (yellow card) 61'; Arévalo Ríos (yellow card) 88'; Saucedo (yellow card) 89'	Referee: Antony Zanjuampa

January 14, 2012 Round 2	Tijuana	1 – 0	Monterrey	Estadio Caliente, Tijuana
18:00	Leandro (yellow card) 38'; Arce (yellow card) 62'; Gandolfi 90+2'	Report	Zavala (yellow card) 52'; Mier (yellow card) 90+1'	Referee: Miguel Ángel Ortega

January 21, 2012 Round 3	Guadalajara	0 – 2	Tijuana	Estadio Omnilife, Zapopan
19:00	Báez (yellow card) 5'; Álvarez (yellow card) 17'; Torres (yellow card) 90'	Report	Gandolfi (yellow card) 40'; Sand 16', 85'; Arce (yellow card) 63'; Santago (yellow card) 90'	Referee: Miguel Ángel Ayala

January 29, 2012 Round 4	Tijuana	1 – 3	Santos Laguna	Estadio Caliente, Tijuana
12:00	Arce (yellow card) 33'; Almazán (yellow card) 44'; Sand 56' (pen.); Gandolfi (yellow card) 64'; Riascos (yellow card) 67'; Corona (yellow card) 72'	Report	Quintero 36'; Estrada (yellow card) 50'; Peralta (yellow card) 53'; Suárez 65'; Rodríguez 70'	Referee: Jorge Isaac Rojas

February 5, 2012 Round 5	Puebla	1 – 1	Tijuana	Estadio Cuauhtémoc, Puebla
12:00	Luis García 25' (pen.); Lacerda (yellow card) 42'; Wila (yellow card) 77'	Report	Riascos 6'; Arce (yellow card) 32'; Santiago (yellow card) 39'; Arévalo Ríos (yellow card) 90+2'	Referee: Miguel Ángel Chacón

February 12, 2012 Round 6	Tijuana	0 – 0	Cruz Azul	Estadio Caliente, Tijuana
12:00	Gandolfi (yellow card) 4'; Arévalo Ríos (yellow card) 63'	Report	Gutiérrez (yellow card) 53'	Referee: Erim Ramírez

February 18, 2012 Round 7	Querétaro	0 – 2	Tijuana	Estadio Corregidora, Querétaro
17:00	Pérez (yellow card) 48'; Sánchez (yellow card) 53'	Report	Sand 50', (yellow card) 66'; Riascos 54'; Arce (yellow card) 55'; Castillo (yellow card) 57'; Corona (yellow card) 67'	Referee: Jorge Eduardo Gasso

February 25, 2012 Round 8	Tijuana	1 – 1	Toluca	Estadio Caliente, Tijuana
19:00	Corona 15'; Nuñez (yellow card) 27'; Santiago (red card) 56'	Report	Alonso (yellow card) 24'; Ríos (yellow card) 79'; Sinha (yellow card) 90+1'	Referee: Miguel Ángel Ortega

March 2, 2012 Round 9	Estudiantes Tecos	0 – 2	Tijuana	Estadio Tres de Marzo, Zapopan
20:10	Gutiérrez (yellow card) 54'; Luna (yellow card) 85'; Castro (yellow card) 89'; Davino (red card) 90+3'	Report	Gandolfi (yellow card) 22'; Maya (yellow card) 24'; Riascos (yellow card) 61'; Sand (yellow card) 64', (goal) 68'; Arévalo Ríos 80'	Referee: Fernando Guerrero

March 9, 2012 Round 10	Tijuana	1 – 1	América	Estadio Caliente, Tijuana
18:10	Sand (red card) 6'; Riascos (yellow card) 59', (goal) 63'; Arévalo Ríos (red card) 73'	Report	Medina (yellow card) 15'; Molina (yellow card) 39'; Vizcarrondo (yellow card) 60'; Jiménez 62'	Referee: José Alfredo Peñaloza

March 17, 2012 Round 11	UANL	1 – 0	Tijuana	Estadio Universitario, San Nicolás
19:00	Lobos 9' (pen.); Ayala (yellow card) 75'; Salcido (yellow card) 89'	Report	Riascos (yellow card) 45+'; Fernández (yellow card) 75'; Pulido (yellow card) 83'	Referee: Roberto García Orozco

March 24, 2012 Round 12	Tijuana	2 – 0	Atlas	Estadio Caliente, Tijuana
19:00	Sand 19'; Arévalo Ríos (yellow card) 35'; Abrego (yellow card) 59' (yellow-red card); Enríquez 69'; Castillo (yellow card) 90+4'	Report	Cufré (red card) 57'; Torres (yellow card) 45+'; Pinto (yellow card) 67'	Referee: Marco Antonio Rodríguez

March 30, 2012 Round 13	Pachuca	1 – 0	Tijuana	Estadio Hidalgo, Pachuca
20:10	Muñoz Mustafá 62'; Franco (yellow card) 67'; Cota (yellow card) 83'	Report	Castillo (yellow card) 28'; Núñez (yellow card) 55'; Lema (red card) 73' (Assistant coach); Gandolfi (yellow card) 75'	Referee: Mauricio Morales

April 8, 2012 Round 14	Tijuana	2 – 1	Atlante	Estadio Caliente, Tijuana
12:00	Tahuilán 13'; Corona 19'; Castillo (yellow card) 31'; Gandolfi (yellow card) 55'	Report	Rojas (yellow card) 23'; Arroyo (yellow card) 33'; Fonseca 60'; Mendoza (yellow card) 78'	Referee: Jorge Antonio Pérez

April 13, 2012 Round 15	Chiapas	0 – 0	Tijuana	Estadio Victor Manuel Reyna, Tuxtla Gutiérrez
20:10	Andrade (yellow card) 10'; Rodríguez (yellow card) 43'	Report	Almazán (yellow card) 39'; Abrego (yellow card) 88'	Referee: Miguel Ángel Chacón

April 21, 2012 Round 16	San Luis	0 – 1	Tijuana	Estadio Alfonso Lastras, San Luis Potosí
17:00	Velasco (yellow card) 63'; Arredondo (yellow card) 70'; Moreno (yellow card) 90+1'	Report	Ruiz (yellow card) 36'; Riascos 74'	Referee: Erim Ramírez

April 29, 2012 Round 17	Tijuana	1 – 1	UNAM	Estadio Caliente, Tijuana
12:00	Riascos (yellow card) 30', (goal) 57'; Abrego (red card) 87'	Report	Espinoza (yellow card) 19'; M. Palacios (yellow card) 30'; Teja (yellow card) 36'; Cortés 89'	Referee: José Alfredo Peñaloza

=== Final phase ===
May 2, 2012 Quarter-finals	Tijuana	1 – 2	Monterrey	Estadio Caliente, Tijuana
20:30	Gandolfi (yellow card) 4'; Fernández (yellow card) 57'; Arce (yellow card) 65'; Ruiz (yellow card) 72' (yellow-red card) 79'; Enriquez 88'	Report	Meza (yellow card) 25'; Zavala 30', (yellow card) 38'; Reyna 49' de Nigris (yellow card) 64'	Referee: Jorge Antonio Pérez

May 5, 2012 Quarter-finals	Monterrey	2 – 2	Tijuana	Estadio Tecnológico, Monterrey
20:00	Reyna (yellow card) 27' (yellow-red card) 32'; Delgado 45+'; Basanta (yellow card) 60', (goal) 65'; Zavala (yellow card) 71'; Meza (yellow card) 81'	Report	Arévalo Ríos 9', 61' (pen.); Maya (yellow card) 19'; Corona (yellow card) 35'; Castillo (yellow card) 43'; Almazán (red card) 50'; Gandolfi (yellow card) 50'; Arce (yellow card) 52'; Pulido (red card) 72'	Referee: Ricardo Arellano

Monterrey advanced 4–3 on aggregate

=== Goalscorers ===
==== Regular season ====
Position	Nation	Name	Goals scored
1.	(Argentina)	José Sand	7
2.	(Colombia)	Duvier Riascos	5
3.	(United States)	Joe Corona	2
4.	(Mexico)	Raúl Enríquez	1
4.	(Argentina)	Javier Gandolfi	1
4.	(Mexico)	Alfredo González Tahuilán	1
4.	(Uruguay)	Egidio Arévalo Ríos	1
TOTAL			18

==== Final phase ====
Position	Nation	Name	Goals scored
1.	(Uruguay)	Egidio Arévalo Ríos	2
2.	(Mexico)	Raúl Enríquez	1
TOTAL			3

=== Results ===
==== Results summary ====
Overall								Home						Away					
Pld	W	D	L	GF	GA	GD	Pts	W	D	L	GF	GA	GD	W	D	L	GF	GA	GD
17	7	7	3	18	11	+7	28	3	4	1	9	7	+2	4	3	2	9	4	+5

Last updated: 29 April 2012.
Source: Clausura 2012 results

==== Results by round ====
Round	1	2	3	4	5	6	7	8	9	10	11	12	13	14	15	16	17
Ground	A	H	A	H	A	H	A	H	A	H	A	H	A	H	A	A	H
Result	D	W	W	L	D	D	W	D	W	D	L	W	L	W	D	W	D
Position	7	6	2	5	7	10	8	8	5	6	8	6	7	7	6	6	7

Updated to match(es) played on 29 April 2012. Source: Clausura 2012 results and mediotiempo.com
A = Away; H = Home; W = Win; D = Draw; L = Loss

== Copa Tijuana ==
Source: RSSSF

Semi-finals
6 July – Estadio Caliente
Monterrey	0
Puebla	1
6 July – Estadio Caliente
Tijuana	1 (3)
San Luis	1 (4)

Final
9 July – Estadio Caliente
Puebla	0
San Luis	1
Third place
9 July – Estadio Caliente
Tijuana	0
Monterrey	1
