= C.D. Irapuato =

Association football club in Mexico

Irapuato
- Full name: Club Deportivo Irapuato
- Nicknames: La Trinca (The Offensive Trident); Los Freseros (The Strawberries); Los Azulgranas (The Blue-and-Garnets)
- Short name: IRA
- Founded: 15 February 1911; 115 years ago 27 March 2022; 4 years ago (refounded)
- Ground: Estadio Sergio León Chávez
- Capacity: 25,000
- Owner: Club Deportivo Irapuato AC
- Chairman: José Antonio Mata Villanueva
- Manager: Luis Almada
- League: Liga Premier (Primera Premier)
- 2026–27: TBD
- Website: cdirapuato.mx
Home colours	Away colours

Club Deportivo Irapuato is a professional football club based in Irapuato, Guanajuato. The club competes in Liga Premier (Primera Premier), the third level of Mexican football, and plays its home matches at Estadio Sergio León Chávez. Founded in 1911, it was the first football club founded in Guanajuato. Throughout its history the club was renamed as Real Irapuato (2002–2004), Club Irapuato Por Siempre (2008–2013) and Club Atlético Irapuato (2019–2020).

Irapuato has mostly played in the lower levels of Mexican football (second and third levels). From 2000 to 2004, the club briefly rose to prominence in the Primera División reaching the final phase. Historically, Irapuato has spent over 26 years in the top level.

The club was relegated from the Primera División in 2004 by financial irregularities, and returned to the Liga de Ascenso on May 2014 when the franchise of Ballenas Galeana Morelos was relocated to Irapuato.

== History ==
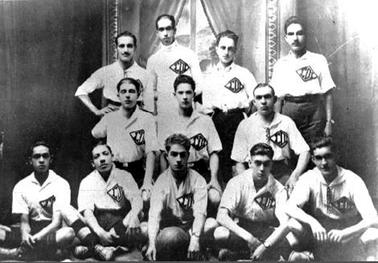
Club Deportivo Internacional de Irapuato in 1921

The club dates back to 1910 in the city of Irapuato, Guanajuato where a club was founded under the name Club Mutualista Irapuatense by Pedro Garnu and by Diego Mosqueda who was an important person in the sports development in the city, and would later go on to establish the club's rival Club León in the 1920s. In its first years many clubs were formed in order to create a futbol league in Guanajuato Deportivo Irapuato, Internacional, Club Marte, ISCO and León inaugurated the league in 1925.

The first tournament was won by Club Marte because the tournament was not finished due to problems between Irapuato and ISCO. In 1928 the club reached the final and played against Deportivo Internacional; the club's squad was made up by Kurt Lenk as keeper Antonio Aguilar and José Núñez playing defender Julián Ramírez, Francisco Belman and Salvador Silva in the mid field and Antonio "El Gato" Baltazar, Crisoforo Juárez, Secundino Alvarado, Teofilo and Juan Aguilera playing as forwards. The club came out with a 1–0 victory, winning its first league title. This club wore a white shirt with black shorts and socks.

The club that plays today under the name Club Deportivo Irapuato was founded in 1948 where it had trouble staying in the league. in the late 1940s there were various clubs that represented the city of Irapuato and it was until 1948 when they decided to merge in order to become more competitive and so they did and joined the Segunda División de México in 1949. The men in charge of the merge were Oscar Bonfiglio and Jesús Vaca Gaona both had participated in the 1928 Olympic games in Amsterdam. The club would once again change its name this time to Club Deportivo Irapuato A.C which many people believe to be the date when the club was established.

=== Promotion to Primera División ===
Irapuato's first game in the México Primera División Against Puebla FC in 1954.

The club was one of the first clubs to inaugurate the Segunda División de México in the 1949–50 tournament where after 3 seasons the club won its first promotion. The club made its debut to the Primera División de México in the league on 22 August 1954 against Zacatepec who they beat 4–5. In the second round the club played at home in the Estadio Revolución stadium against Puebla who they also defeated 4–0. The club also revived its rivalry which had stopped in the late 1930s against León, that game ended in a 1–1 draw. The club's best tournament was the 1963–64 Mexican Primera División season where the club finished 4th place with 32 points; Guadalajara finished with 33 points.

=== Relegation ===
In the 1971-72 season the club found itself playing in group 2 with clubs Monterrey, Guadalajara, Puebla, Atlante, Pachuca, Pumas, Toluca and Torreón. At the end of the tournament the club finished last and had to play a relegation series against the other last place teams. The series was played against Torreón, Atlético Español, and Veracruz. the first match was played against Veracruz who defeated them 3–1 the first leg, the second leg ended in a 0–0 draw. The last game was played against Torreón in the Estadio Jalisco where Irapuato lost 1–0 and were relegated for the first time in 18 years to the Segunda División de México.

=== Segunda División ===
Back in the Segunda División the club became a top club reaching the final in its first year back against Petroleros de Ciudad Madero. The first game was played in Irapuato which they won 1–0. It seemed the club would clinch its promotion having the second match at home, but surprisingly Ciudad Madero came out with a 2–0 victory and so earning its promotion.

In the 1974–75 season, the club had its second opportunity when they once again reached the final this time playing against Tecos. The club would lose that final match 1–0. It took place in the Estadio Azteca in Mexico City.

The club would get a third opportunity to earn a promotion in 1978; this time against Zacatepec. This time a series was played. The first match ended in a 1–0 victory for Zacatepec. The second match ended in a 4–1 victory for Zacatepec and so the club would lose its third promotion series in 6 years.

=== Second promotion ===
In the 1980s the club had a streak of qualifying to the quarterfinals but not been able to reach the final. After four years the club finally reached the final in the 1984-85 tournament under the management of Diego Malta Solano against Pachuca. The first match was played in Irapuato where they took a 2–1 advantage. in the return match Irapuato came out with a win and finally earn the promotion after 13 years. Notable players from that club were Anselmo Romero, Rafael Lira, Jesús Montes, Eugenio Constantino and Teodoro Orozco.

=== Second relegation ===
In the 1990-91 season Irapuato got relegated to the Segunda División for the second time. In 1994, Irapuato joined the newly formed Primera División 'A' de México and got the opportunity to return to the Primera División.

=== 1999–00 promotion ===
In the Invierno 99 season, Irapuato faced Zacatepec in the Final, they beat them 3–1 in the first leg with goals from Cristián Ariel Morales, and Martín Rodríguez in the second leg things got complicated when Zacatepec tied the game, but Morales and Rodriguez scored and they took the championship with an overall score of 5–3.

In the Verano 2000 season, the champion Irapuato made it to the final, again this time facing Cruz Azul Hidalgo if Irapuato would win they would be promoted to the Primera División, the first leg was played in Hidalgo and the score was 2–2 Martín Rodríguez and Jesús Gutiérrez scored the two goals for Irapuato. The second leg and Promotional Final was played in The Sergio León Chávez on 10 June 2000. The final score was 2–2 Cristián Morales and Martín Rodríguez scored for Irapuato, Alejandro Corona and James Owusu-Ansah scored for Cruz Azul Hidalgo. In extra time no one scored so they went to penalties, Cruz Azul Hidalgo's Pedro Resendiz, Josef Nemec, scored the penalties but Erik Marín, and Mario Ramírez missed. However, Irapuato's Martín Rodríguez, Cristián Morales, Víctor Saavedra and Héctor Gómez scored the penalties the final score was 4–2 in penalties. Irapuato would return to the Primera División almost a decade after being relegated in 1991.

=== First disappearance ===
Suddenly, on 26 December 2001, Grupo Pegaso announced that Irapuato was sold and moved to the city of Veracruz, Veracruz and renamed Tiburones Rojos de Veracruz for its spot in the Primera División after the original Veracruz franchise was sold and moved to Tuxtla Gutiérrez, Chiapas and renamed Jaguares de Chiapas, and therefore, the city Irapuato was left without a team for the Verano 2002 season. Also, in the Invierno 2002 season or Apertura 2002, it was announced that Querétaro, a Segunda División team was also sold and moved to Irapuato under the name Real Irapuato. In their first season, they made it to the final against La Piedad and eventually won the Apertura 2002 championship in penalties.

=== First reappearance ===
For the Apertura 2002, Querétaro, a team from the Primera División 'A' de México was sold and transferred to Irapuato after La Piedad was dissolved in the Primera División and later sold and transferred to the city of Querétaro, Querétaro.

=== 2002–03 promotion ===
In the 2003, season Irapuato made it to the 2002-03 promotional final against Clausura 2003 champions and arch rivals León. The first leg was played on 18 June 2003 when Irapuato won the Clásico del Bajío and the first game in Leon's home 2–1 with a goal from Ariel González and an own goal from Gorsd, the second leg was played in Irapuato and in the last moments of the game Josias Ferreira scores a goal ending the game 1–0 and returning Irapuato to the Primera División.

=== Second disappearance ===
After the Clausura 2004, Irapuato ended up with 6 wins, 8 ties and 5 losses with a total of 26 points. It was announced that the club was sold and relocated to the city of Colima, Colima, but the FMF reduced the league from 20 to 18 teams, and Irapuato was joined with Querétaro to dissolve both of those teams.

=== Second reappearance and third relegation ===
Irapuato was the city without a soccer team for 1 year, but it was announced that Mérida F.C., a team from the Segunda División was transferred to Irapuato for the Apertura 2005. After the Clausura 2006, the team was playing for a survival to stay in the league, but they relegated to the Tercera División de México after losing in a playoff against Delfines de Coatzacoalcos.

=== Return to Liga de Ascenso ===
- Apertura 2008: Promoted from the Segunda División from Pachuca Juniors and renamed "Club Irapuato Por Siempre". They made it all the way to the final, but lost to Querétaro on the road after tied 0–0 at their home turf.
- Clausura 2009: Bad Torneo, with 20 points (17th overall and 4th in Group 2).
- Apertura 2009: Changed format to one full standings from 3 groups from the federation and reduced the teams to 17. Clinched Homefield and 1st round bye with a first-place finish of a total of 32 points. They made it all the way to the final for the second time in 3 Torneos, but lost to Necaxa in extra time at home after losses 1–0 on the road in the first leg.
- Bicentenario 2010: They maintain their roster, but finished 11th place with 20 points.
- Apertura 2010: Increased the teams to 18. They brought Cuauhtémoc Blanco to Irapauto for 1.5 seasons. They made it all the way to the final for the third time in 5 Torneos, but lost to Veracruz (the top seed in the playoffs) in full-time on the road after tied 1–1 at their home turf in the first leg with their 26 points and finished in the top 4.

=== Clausura 2011 Champions ===
In the Clausura 2011 Season, Irapuato was crowned Champion by defeating Tijuana in the final with a score of 2–1. The First Leg was played in Tijuana, Baja California and it ended in a 1–1 draw goals were scored by Luis Alberto Valdez at 8' for Irapuato, and Alejandro Molina at 60' for Tijuana. The Second Leg was played in Irapuato and ended in a 1–0 win for Irapuato crowning them as Champions of the Clausura 2011, the goal was scored by José Cruz Gutiérrez in the 85' minute of the game.

Champions of Clausura 2011

=== Squad ===
- (Mexico) 1 Adrián Martínez
- (Mexico) 2 Margarito González
- (Mexico) 8 Jorge Manrique
- (Mexico) 10 Cuauhtémoc Blanco
- (Argentina) 11 Ariel González (substituted off) 89'
- (Mexico) 13 Gandhi Vega
- (Mexico) 16 Arturo Alvarado
- (Argentina) 18 Esteban Alberto González (substituted off) 64'
- (Mexico) 21 José Luis López (substituted off) 88'
- (Mexico) 27 Gerardo Gomez
- (Mexico) 44 Juan Carlos Arellano

Substitutes

- (Mexico) 6 Francisco Razo (substituted on) 89'
- (Mexico) 7 Alejandro Castillo
- (Mexico) 45 José Cruz Gutiérrez (substituted on) 64'
- (Mexico) 23 Javier Saavedra
- (Mexico) 28 Luis Alberto Valdés
- (Mexico) 29 José Guadalupe Martínez
- (Mexico) 58 Efraín Cruz (substituted on) 88'
- (Argentina) 5 Ezequiel Brítez

=== 2011 promotional final ===
==== 1st leg ====
After being crowned Champions of the Clausura 2011 season. Irapuato faced Tijuana the Apertura 2010 Champions again, for a spot in the Primera División. The First leg of the Promotional final was played at Irapuato, Guanajuato on 18 May 2011, four days after winning the championship at home. Irapuato was highly motivated to return to the Primera División after 7 years of absence, Tijuana on the other hand had never had Primera División experience. The first leg of the final was tied in a scoreless tie between the two teams.

18 May 2011
20:00 UTC−5

Irapuato	0–0	Tijuana
	Report

Estadio Sergio León Chávez
Referee: César Arturo Ramos (Mexico)

Irapuato	Tijuana

GK	1	(Mexico) Adrián Martínez
LB	13	(Mexico) Gandhi Vega	(yellow card) 67'
CB	16	(Mexico) Arturo Alvarado
CB	6	(Mexico) Francisco Razo
RB	2	(Mexico) Margarito González
LM	45	(Mexico) José Cruz Gutiérrez	(substituted off) 75'
CM	27	(Mexico) Gerardo Gómez	(yellow card) 63'	(substituted off) 73'
CM	8	(Mexico) Jorge Manrique	(yellow card) 73'
RM	21	(Mexico) José Luis López	(substituted off) 64'
CF	11	(Argentina) Ariel González (c)
CF	10	(Mexico) Cuauhtémoc Blanco	(yellow card) 87'
Substitutions:
RM	28	(Mexico) Luis Alberto Valdés	(substituted on) 64'
CM	23	(Mexico) Javier Saavedra	(substituted on) 73'
LM	18	(Argentina) Esteban Alberto González	(substituted on) 75'
Manager:
(Mexico) Ignacio Rodríguez

GK	25	(Mexico) Leonín Pineda
RB	2	(Mexico) Richard Ruíz
CB	3	(Argentina) Javier Gandolfi (c)
CB	5	(Mexico) Joshua Abrego	(yellow card) 86'
CB	4	(Mexico) Miguel Almazán
LB	13	(Mexico) Alejandro Molina	(substituted off) 67'
RW	28	(Mexico) Fernando Massiel Santana
CM	16	(Mexico) Gerardo Galindo	(yellow card) 61'
CM	10	(Mexico) Raúl Enríquez	(substituted off) 85'
LW	22	(Mexico) Juan Carlos Núñez
CF	11	(Mexico) Luis Orozco	(substituted off) 74'
Substitutions:
CB	24	(Argentina) Javier Yacuzzi	(substituted on) 67'
CF	9	(Argentina) Mauro Gerk	(substituted on) 74'
CF	29	(Mexico) Armando Pulido	(substituted on) 85'
Manager:
(Mexico) Joaquín del Olmo

==== 2nd leg ====
Three days after the first match in Irapuato, the second leg of the Promotional final was played in Tijuana's Estadio Caliente stadium. Tijuana made several changes to their starting 11 players, replacing defender Miguel Almazán with a forward, and changing their formation from a 5-4-1 formation to a more attacking 4-2-2 formation. Irapuato made many drastic changes as well; they changed to a 5-3-2 formation fortifying their defense with 5 players. During the match, Tijuana had various chances for goal and the first goal came from young prospect Joe Corona scoring a header in the first half. Three minutes later, Mauro Gerk scored. Five minutes after the second goal, Irapuato scored after Alejandro Molina from Tijuana accidentally pushed the ball into the net from a free kick done by José Cruz Gutiérrez. The game ended in a 2–1 win for Tijuana. Tijuana got promoted to the Primera División while Irapuato remained in the Liga de Ascenso de México.

21 May 2011
15:00 UTC−7

Tijuana	2–1	Irapuato
Joe Corona 29'; Mauro Gerk 31'	Report	Alejandro Molina (own goal) 38'

Estadio Caliente, Tijuana, Baja California, Mexico
Attendance: 33,333
Referee: Oscar Macías Romo (Mexico)

Tijuana	Irapuato

GK	25	(Mexico) Leonín Pineda
RB	2	(Mexico) Richard Ruíz
CB	3	(Argentina) Javier Gandolfi (c)	(substituted off) 64'
CB	13	(Mexico) Alejandro Molina	(OG 38)
LB	5	(Mexico) Joshua Abrego
CM	16	(Mexico) Gerardo Galindo	(yellow card) 50'
CM	17	(Mexico) Félix Ayala	(yellow card) 4'	(substituted off) 71'
RW	15	(United States) Joe Corona	29'
AM	10	(Mexico) Raúl Enríquez
LW	24	(Argentina) Javier Yacuzzi
CF	9	(Argentina) Mauro Néstor Gerk	31'	(substituted off) 60'
Substitutions:
CB	4	(Mexico) Miguel Almazán	(substituted on) 64'
CM	22	(Mexico) Juan Carlos Núñez	(substituted on) 72'
FW	11	(Mexico) Luis Orozco	(substituted on) 60'
Manager:
(Mexico) Joaquín del Olmo

GK	1	(Mexico) Adrián Martínez
RB	16	(Mexico) Arturo Alvarado	(substituted off) 74'
CB	13	(Mexico) Gandhi Vega	(yellow card) 65'
CB	44	(Mexico) Juan Carlos Arellano
CB	2	(Mexico) Margarito González
LB	27	(Mexico) Gerardo Gómez
CM	8	(Mexico) Jorge Manrique
RW	58	(Mexico) Efraín Cruz	(yellow card) 23'	(substituted off) 33'
LF	11	(Argentina) Ariel González (c)	(substituted off) 55'
LW	45	(Mexico) José Cruz Gutiérrez
RF	28	(Mexico) Luis Alberto Valdés	(yellow card) 47'
Substitutions:
LB	19	(Mexico) Jonathan Miramontes	(substituted on) 74'
LW	21	(Mexico) José Luis López	(substituted on) 33'
RF	7	(Mexico) Alejandro Castillo	(substituted on) 5'
Manager:
(Mexico) Ignacio Rodríguez

=== After promotional final ===
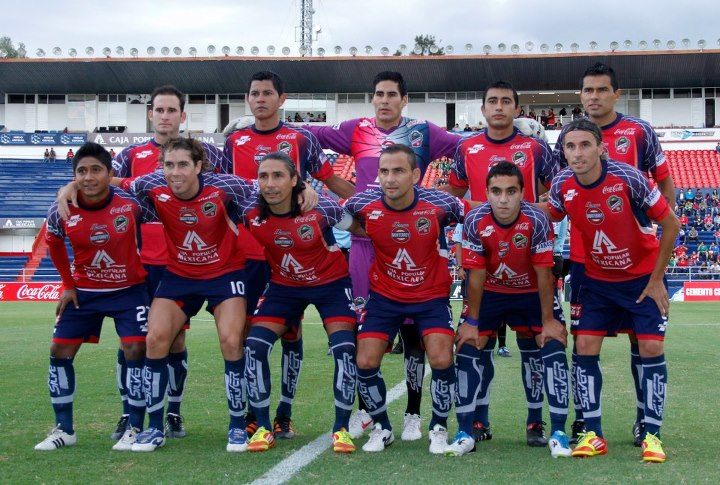
Irapuato during the 2012-13 Season

- Apertura 2011: The league reduced the teams to 16. Cuauhtémoc Blanco didn't play some games due to injury, but they still finished in 5th place. However, they were eliminated in the Quarterfinals by their rivals León.
- Clausura 2012: The league reduced the teams once again to 15 teams. Cuauhtémoc Blanco was released from the team due to injury issues and a bad season. They earned 14 points and finished in 12th place after they didn't win in their final 5 games.
- Apertura 2012: They have their worst season, with 16 points. They finished in 12th place after they didn't win in their last 5 games. When the season was over, the federation was owed 3 million for Cuauhtémoc Blanco. On 15 December, they had a 65% chance of being dissolved. The team was then sold and relocated to Zacatepec, Morelos and renamed Zacatepec beginning next season.

=== Third disappearance and played in Segunda División ===
After the Clausura 2013, Irapuato finished in the bottom 5 of the standings and the team was sold and moved to Zacatepec, Morelos and rebranded as Zacatepec 1948. Union de Curtidores was rumored to be moving into the city of Irapuato to replace the dissolved franchise there, but the owner of Union de Curtidores decided to keep the team in León after getting approval to play their home games in Estadio Nou Camp. However, some time after a franchise from the city of Querétaro was purchased, the team was revived in the Segunda Division de México and began playing in the Liga Premier for the Apertura 2013.

The franchise came to join the Copa de la Liga Premier de Ascenso Apertura 2013, where they reached the final against Cruz Azul Jasso and lost 1–0 on aggregate, so Irapuato was runner-up. At the end of the tournament the franchise returned to the city of Querétaro, because of the restructuring that occurred in Grupo Delfines, which decided that the team that played in the Apertura 2013 at Estadio Sergio León Chávez as Irapuato, would return to their roots to play either at Estadio Corregidora or La Cañada.

=== Return to Ascenso MX and third reappearance ===
On 29 May 2014, Enrique Bonilla, Sports CEO of the Ascenso MX unveiled the emergence of Irapuato, instead of Ballenas Galeana, who had to relocate to the city of Irapuato due to their economic and financial problems, same which were resolved by guanajuatenses entrepreneurs which in turn called for the team to move to their state. Furthermore, circulated a letter from the President of the Civil Association Club Irapuato, J. Concepción Director and Enrique Bonilla, secretary general of the Ascenso MX, where the AC are declared owners of the brand name and badge Irapuato equipment. Ballenas Galeana was sold and moved to Irapuato and renamed Club Irapuato.

=== Fourth disappearance and returns to Liga Premier ===
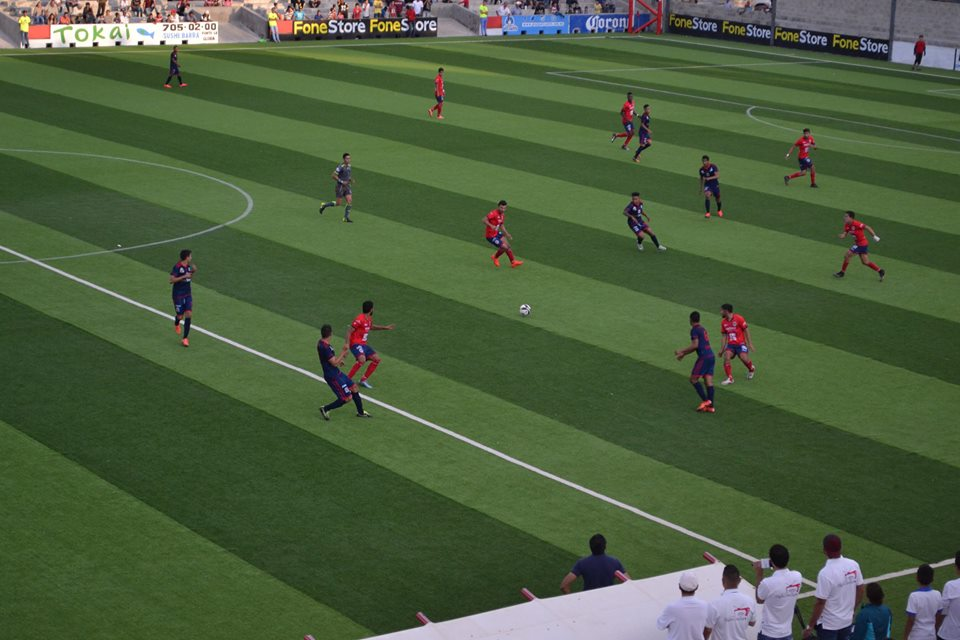
Tepatitlan vs. Irapuato on 29 October 2016

On 7 June 2015, Irapuato was officially sold and relocated to Los Mochis, Sinaloa and renamed Murciélagos Los Mochis. They began playing in the Segunda División de México after playing one season in the Ascenso MX.

From 2015, Irapuato reached three consecutive finals, losing them all. The Apertura 2016 and Clausura 2017 against Tlaxcala and the Apertura 2017 against Tepatitlán.

=== Atlético Irapuato ===
On 17 June 2019, the team was renamed as Atlético Irapuato, but maintained the same shield design, colors and identity.

=== Club Deportivo Irapuato ===
On 30 July 2020, the club was renamed Club Deportivo Irapuato after Grupo Temachalco took possession of the franchise. At the end of the season, the team won its third Segunda División championship after defeating Cruz Azul Hidalgo 1–3 on the aggregate scoreboard.

At first it was reported that Irapuato was promoted after the Liga Premier championship. However, on 3 June 2021, the FMF announced the opening of a selection process to choose the club that would occupy the Liga Premier's third place, because Irapuato still had to meet some requirements to compete in the Liga de Expansión MX, three Liga Premier clubs were chosen for an audit process that would determine the winner of the promotion. On 5 July 2021, it was confirmed that no team undergoing the certification audit approved the procedure, so there would be no club promoted from the Liga Premier, for this reason the promotion of Irapuato was very frustrated by administrative issues of the club and regulations of the league.

Therefore, the club announced that it would continue to participate in the Serie A and began a process to form a new roster of players. However, at the end of August 2021, Grupo Tecamachalco transferred the franchise to local businessmen to ensure its continuity and avoid promotion problems for the club, this after Fernando San Román, CEO of Tecamachalco, was sanctioned by the FMF and the company decided to seek the purchase of a football team in Costa Rica.

However, at the end of August 2021, the Irapuato city council denied the use of the Estadio Sergio León Chávez to the club due to breach of the agreement signed between the team and the government, since a clause of the agreement stipulated that the team should be promoted to the Liga de Expansión MX for the 2021–22 season, something that could not be fulfilled. After this fact, the new board sought to establish the team in a city near Irapuato while the city council negotiated with the owners of Alebrijes de Oaxaca for the arrival of a new franchise that would continue the football in the city. Finally, neither the club nor the city council managed to close the negotiations, so on 10 September, it was announced that the team went into a hiatus, so it would not dispute any competition during the season.

After two years of absence, the team was reestablished in June 2023, keeping the name Club Deportivo Irapuato and returning to play in the Liga Premier – Serie A. Under that era, the team won the Serie A championship in the 2025 Clausura tournament.

Following that victory, the team began to be considered as a candidate for an invitation to participate in the Liga de Expansión MX. This invitation became effective on 19 June 2025, when Irapuato's entry into that league as a guest team was announced because Peribán, the season's champion team in the Liga Premier – Serie A, did not meet the requirements to aspire to promotion. However, the announcement sparked an institutional crisis within the team. Juan Manuel Albo, president of an association named Club Deportivo Irapuato A.C., which holds the rights to the club's logo and name, announced that he would not allow the franchise operated by Healthy People to play in the Liga de Expansión MX due to an alleged financial debt related to the payment of the rights to use the brand. Furthermore, Albo intended to pursue his own sports project in the same league. Consequently, the league and the FMF announced that they would not allow the participation of any project other than the one operated by Healthy People, which caused football in Irapuato to go on a hiatus for several weeks.

The crisis was finally resolved after the intervention of the Government of Guanajuato, which acted as a mediator between the opposing sides, and on 10 July 2025, Irapuato's entry into the Liga de Expansión MX was confirmed.

In Apertura 2025, their first tournament in the Liga de Expansión, Irapuato finished the regular season in fourth place in the standings, advancing to the playoffs. In the quarterfinals they eliminated Mineros de Zacatecas and in the semifinals Atlético Morelia, in both cases with ties in aggregate but getting the pass because they were the best seeded team, so Irapuato qualified for the final in the tournament of return to the second tier of Mexican football. However, in the final they were defeated by Club Jaiba Brava with a score of 1-0, so Irapuato finished the tournament as runner-up in the Liga de Expansión. In their second tournament, the team failed to match the performance shown in the Apertura 2025, so Irapuato was left out of the tournament's play-offs.

At the end of the 2025–26 season, the conflict between Healthy People and Club Deportivo Irapuato A.C. returned, as the civil association refused to renew the rights transfer contract, so the club lost its place in the Liga de Expansión, because the League and the Mexican Football Federation announced that they would only allow a franchise in Irapuato if it was operated by Healthy People, which became impossible after losing the rights to use the club's brand.

Unable to manage the team in any other division, Healthy People ended its operations with the club, which led the civil association to negotiate with other businessmen to recover the team. Finally, at the end of June 2026, the new project was presented with local operation and allied to Club Pachuca.

Meanwhile, Healthy People launched a parallel project based on the youth squad Irapuato fielded in the Liga TDP (fourth division); the side was named Trinca de Mi Vida F.C., it was established with the goal of creating a team independent of any affiliation with the Club Deportivo Irapuato Civil Association.

== Historic badges ==
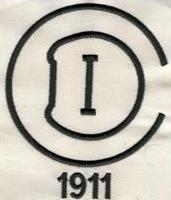
1911

2008–13

== Names ==
=== Denominations and franchises ===
Throughout its history, "Irapuato" has seen how the name of the institution has changed to its current name. The club was founded under the name of Club Deportivo Irapuato. The different names that the club has had throughout its history are listed below:

Club Deportivo Irapuato: (1948-01) Official name when the franchise debuted.

Real Irapuato: (2002–04) Official name when the franchise moved from Querétaro to Irapuato.

Club Deportivo Irapuato: (2005–08) Official name when the franchise moves from Mérida to Irapuato.

Club Irapuato Por Siempre: (2008–13) Official name when the Pachuca Juniors franchise moves to Irapuato.

Club Deportivo Irapuato: (2013–14) Official name when the franchise moves from Querétaro "B" to Irapuato.

Club Deportivo Irapuato: (2014–15) Official name when the Ballenas Galeana franchise moves to Irapuato.

Club Deportivo Irapuato: (2015–18) Official name when Desarrollodora de Fútbol México ALC becomes the owner of the team and makes it a subsidiary of Celaya.

Club Deportivo Irapuato: (2018–19) Official name when Jorge Rocha becomes owner of the team.

Club Atlético Irapuato: (2019–20) Official name when Jorge Rocha decides to change it.

Club Deportivo Irapuato: (2020–present) Official name when Grupo Tecamachalco became the owner of the team and maintained by the management of the Healthy People company.

=== Owner ===
- Pegaso Group: (1994-2001)
- Mexican Sports Promoter: (2002–04)
- Arturo and Mauricio Millet Reyes: (2005–08)
- Ramón Morató: (2008–13)
- Concepción Enríquez Fernández: (2013–14)
- FAHARO Group S.A. de C.V.: (2014–15)
- Soccer Developer México ALC S.A. de C.V.: (2015–18)
- Jorge Rocha: (2018–20)
- Tecamachalco Group: (2020–21)
- Healthy People: (2023–26)

== Stadium ==
Estadio Sergio León Chávez
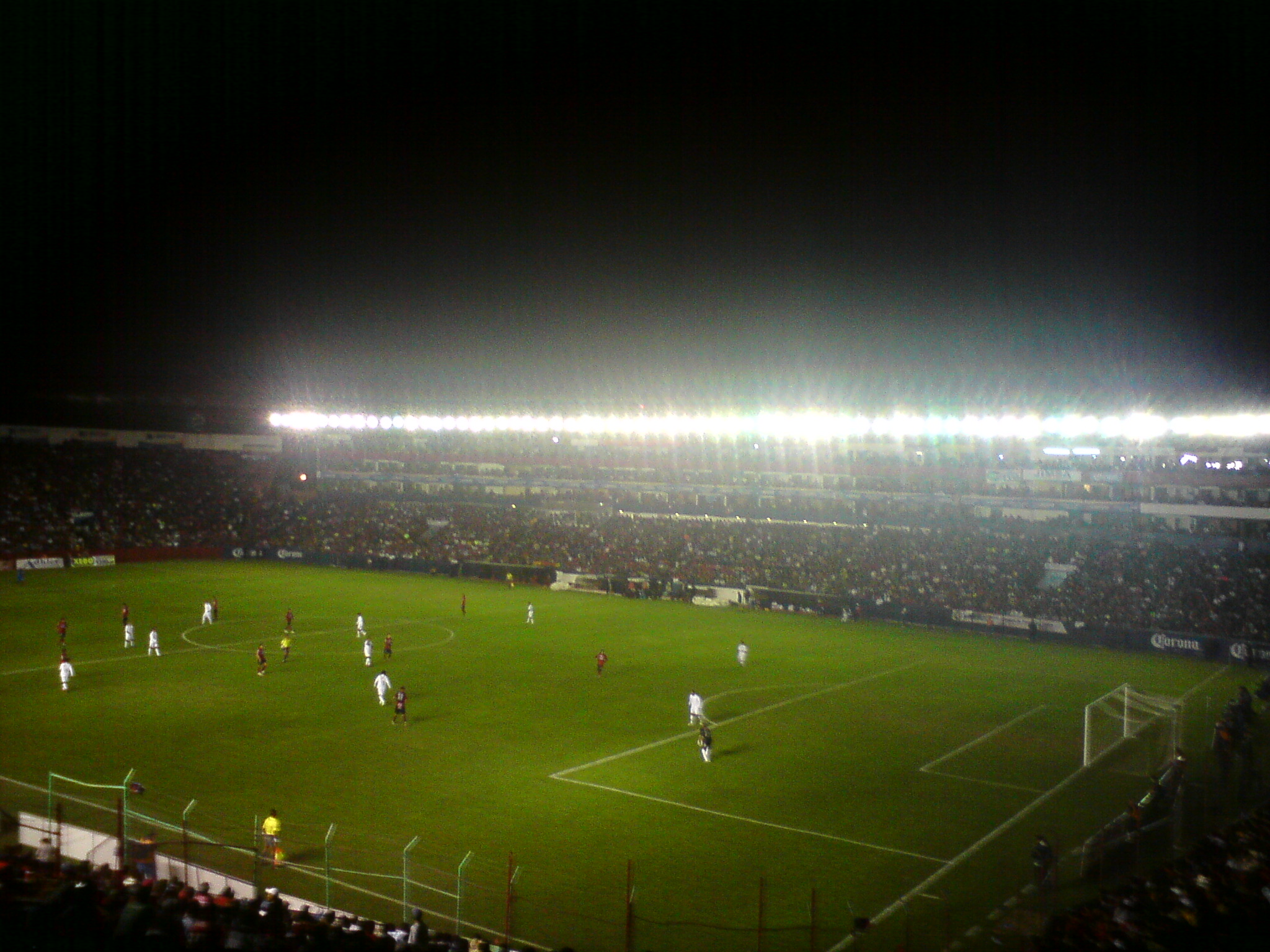
- Former names: Estadio Irapuato (1969–1990)
- Location: Irapuato, Guanajuato, Mexico

Irapuato FC play their home matches at Estadio Irapuato founded on 23 March 1969 under the name "Estadio Irapuato" renamed Estadio Sergio Leon Chavez in 1990. Irapuato played their first home matches at Estadio Revolucion. On 27 October 1968 the board of Irapuato invited the Spanish Olympic football team that competed at the 1968 Olympics to play a friendly match against Irapuato, the stadium recorded a large entry in that game the Spanish beat Irapuato.

The first goal was scored by the captain of Spain Juan Manuel Asensi and Marco Antonio Sanchez Moya of Irapuato tied the score. 23 March 1969 was the official opening. in 1970 the Mexico National Team played vs Irapuato at that time Mexico was being prepared for the 1970 FIFA World Cup, The Mexico national team came out victorious with a score of 4–1.

The stadium has hosted two international football tournaments, the 1983 FIFA World Youth Championship and the 1986 FIFA World Cup.

== Season to season ==
Season	League (Division)	League & Playoff Result
1911–1950	Amateur League	
1950-51	Segunda División de México (2nd)	4th
1951-52	Segunda División de México (2nd)	5th
1952-53	Segunda División de México (2nd)	3rd
1953-54	Segunda División de México (2nd)	1st, Champion; (Promoted)
1954–55	Primera División de México (1st)	10th
1955–56	Primera División de México (1st)	9th
1956–57	Primera División de México (1st)	5th
1957–58	Primera División de México (1st)	8th
1958–59	Primera División de México (1st)	7th
1959–60	Primera División de México (1st)	6th
1960–61	Primera División de México (1st)	12th
1961–62	Primera División de México (1st)	6th
1962–63	Primera División de México (1st)	11th
1963–64	Primera División de México (1st)	4th
1964–65	Primera División de México (1st)	15th
1965–66	Primera División de México (1st)	10th
1966–67	Primera División de México (1st)	9th
1967–68	Primera División de México (1st)	11th
1968–69	Primera División de México (1st)	14th
1969–70	Primera División de México (1st)	14th
1970–71	Primera División de México (1st)	7th
1971–72	Primera División de México (1st)	9th, Relegated
1972-73	Segunda División de México (2nd)	2nd, Runner-up
1973-74	Segunda División de México (2nd)	10th, DNQ
1974-75	Segunda División de México (2nd)	1st, Runner-up
1975-76	Segunda División de México (2nd)	6th, Playoffs
1976-77	Segunda División de México (2nd)	4th, Playoffs
1977-78	Segunda División de México (2nd)	2nd, Runner-up
1978-79	Segunda División de México (2nd)	6th, DNQ
1979-80	Segunda División de México (2nd)	11th, DNQ
1980-81	Segunda División de México (2nd)	20th, DNQ
1981-82	Segunda División de México (2nd)	21st, Relegated
1982-83	Segunda División B (3rd)	5th, Play-in
1983-84	Segunda División de México (2nd)	3rd, Play-in
1984-85	Segunda División de México (2nd)	4th, Champion; (Promoted)
1985–86	Primera División de México (1st)	7th, DNQ
1986–87	Primera División de México (1st)	16th, DNQ
1987–88	Primera División de México (1st)	15th, DNQ
1988–89	Primera División de México (1st)	17th, DNQ
1989–90	Primera División de México (1st)	12th, DNQ
1990–91	Primera División de México (1st)	20th, DNQ
1991-92	Segunda División de México (2nd)	2nd, Semi-finals
1992-93	Segunda División de México (2nd)	5th, Quarter-Finals
1993-94	Segunda División de México (2nd)	3rd, Runner-Up
1994–95	Primera División A (2nd)	6th, Play-in
1995–96	Primera División A (2nd)	13th, DNQ
Invierno 1996	Primera División A (2nd)	2nd, Quarter-Finals
Verano 1997	Primera División A (2nd)	9th, DNQ
Invierno 1997	Primera División A (2nd)	7th, Quarter-Finals
Verano 1998	Primera División A (2nd)	14th, DNQ
Invierno 1998	Primera División A (2nd)	2nd, Semi-Finals
Verano 1999	Primera División A (2nd)	4th, Semi-Finals
Invierno 1999	Primera División A (2nd)	1st, Champion
Verano 2000	Primera División A (2nd)	2nd, Champion; (Promoted)
Invierno 2000	Primera División de México (1st)	9th, Play-in
Verano 2001	Primera División de México (1st)	18th, DNQ
Invierno 2001	Primera División de México (1st)	14th, DNQ
Invierno 2002	Primera División A (2nd)	2nd, Champion
Verano 2003	Primera División A (2nd)	6th, Quarter-Finals; (Promoted)
Apertura 2003	Primera División de México (1st)	15th, DNQ
Clausura 2004	Primera División de México (1st)	9th, DNQ
Apertura 2004	Segunda División de México (3rd)	7th
Clausura 2005	Segunda División de México (3rd)	9th
Apertura 2005	Primera División A (2nd)	19th, DNQ
Clausura 2006	Primera División A (2nd)	18th, DNQ
Apertura 2006	Segunda División de México (3rd)	10th, DNQ
Clausura 2007	Segunda División de México (3rd)	3rd, Quarter-Finals
Apertura 2007	Segunda División de México (3rd)	3rd, Round of 16
Clausura 2008	Segunda División de México (3rd)	7th, DNQ
Apertura 2008	Primera División A (2nd)	7th, Runner-Up
Clausura 2009	Primera División A (2nd)	17th, DNQ
Apertura 2009	Liga de Ascenso (2nd)	1st, Runner-Up
Bicentenario 2010	Liga de Ascenso (2nd)	8th, DNQ
Apertura 2010	Liga de Ascenso (2nd)	6th, Semi-finals
Clausura 2011	Liga de Ascenso (2nd)	2nd, Champions
Apertura 2011	Liga de Ascenso (2nd)	5th, Quarter-Finals
Clausura 2012	Liga de Ascenso (2nd)	10th, DNQ
Apertura 2012	Liga de Ascenso (2nd)	11th, DNQ
Clausura 2013	Ascenso MX (2nd)	15th, DNQ
Apertura 2013	Liga Premier de Ascenso (3rd)	7th, DNQ
Clausura 2014	Liga Premier de Ascenso (3rd)	2nd, DNQ
Apertura 2014	Ascenso MX (2nd)	12th, DNQ
Clausura 2015	Ascenso MX (2nd)	10th, DNQ
Apertura 2015	Liga Premier de Ascenso (3rd)	9th, DNQ
Clausura 2016	Liga Premier de Ascenso (3rd)	4th, DNQ
Apertura 2016	Liga Premier de Ascenso (3rd)	5th, Runner-up
Clausura 2017	Liga Premier de Ascenso (3rd)	1st, Runner-up
Apertura 2017	Liga Premier de México-Serie A (3rd)	3rd, Runner-up
Clausura 2018	Liga Premier de México-Serie A (3rd)	3rd, Semi-finals
2018-19	Liga Premier de México-Serie A (3rd)	1st, Quarter-Finals
2019-20	Liga Premier de México-Serie A (3rd)	CANCELED (COVID-19)
2020-21	Liga Premier de México-Serie A (3rd)	3rd, Champion
2023–24	Liga Premier de México-Serie A (3rd)	4th, Quarter-Finals
Apertura 2024	Liga Premier de México-Serie A (3rd)	3rd, Runner-up
Clausura 2025	Liga Premier de México-Serie A (3rd)	2nd, Champion
Apertura 2025	Liga de Expansión MX (2nd)	4th, Runner-up
Clausura 2026	Liga de Expansión MX (2nd)	9th, DNQ

- 29 seasons in First Division
- 46 seasons in Second Division
- 21 seasons in Third Division

== League goal scoring champions ==
Name	Season	Goals
(Mexico) Jaime Belmonte	Primera División de México 1961–62	6
(Mexico) Jaime Belmonte	Primera División de México 1963–64	7
(Mexico) Ángel Lemus	Primera División A Verano 97	12
(Argentina) Cristián Morales	Primera División A Invierno 98	19
(Argentina) Cristián Morales	Primera División A Invierno 99	17
(Uruguay) Martín Rodríguez Alba	Primera División de México Invierno 01	12
(Argentina) Ariel González	Liga de Ascenso Apertura 2009	11
(Argentina) Ariel González	Liga de Ascenso Bicentenario 2010	11

== Nickname ==
The nickname "Trinca Fresera", which means "Strawberry Lashers", originates from the year 1949, when the team got an invitation to Play teams such as La Piedad, Leon, and the Brazilian Team Vasco da Gama. The Games would Take Place in The Estadio de la Ciudad de Los Deportes now known as Estadio Azul in Mexico City. Vasco da Gama had a very good Offence, in that time it was known as "la trinca infernal" the term trinca, utilized in that time as a reference for 3, trinca infernal referenced Vasco da Gama's Offence which had 3 very agile, quick men. Don Agustín González Escopeta, Master of the Sport Commentary, Watched the Match between Irapuato and La Piedad, chronically the Leon vs Vasco match was on and He said: "si el Vasco da Gama es una trinca infernal, el Irapuato es la trinca fresera" ¡que bonito juegan!, which meant "If Vasco da Gama are the Infernal Lashers then Irapuato are the Strawberry Lashers ¡boy they play nice!" . It was then that don Agustín González Escopeta, Baptized Irapuato as la trinca fresera, To this date in any Stadium they enter the fans identify them as la trinca fresera del Irapuato.

== Shirt sponsors and manufacturers ==
Season/Year	Kit manufacturer	Primary Shirt partner
1980's	Le Coq Sportif	
1980's-1993	Adidas	El Pollo Loco
1994-95	Afghans	Corona Extra
Invierno 1996	Jima	Corona Extra
Verano 1997-Verano 98	Marval	Corona Extra
Invierno 1998-Verano 2000*	Garcis	Corona Extra
Invierno 2000-Invierno 2001	Garcis	Grupo Pegaso/Bimbo
Invierno 2002*	Garcis	Grupo Pegaso/Pollo Feliz
Verano 2003	Gaytan	Bimbo
2003-04	Eescord	Boing!/Tres Hermanos Shoes/Rezza Editores
2004-05	Eescord	Volkswagen
2005-06	Keuka	C.Botanica Azteca
2006-07	Keuka	Caja Libertad/Honda
2007-08	Keuka	Caja Libertad/Corona Extra
2008-09	Keuka	Caja Libertad/Corona Extra
2009-10	Keuka	Caja Libertad/U Taisan/ALDE/Credicor Mexicano/Corona Extra
2010	Concord	Caja Libertad/U Taisan/ALDE/Credicor Mexicano/Corona Extra
Clausura 2011*	Concord	Caja Libertad/U Taisan/ALDE/ETN/Adhler/Tele Cable/Corona Extra
Apertura 2011-Clausura 2012	Concord	Caja Libertad/ALDE/Don Billete/Corona Extra/Tele Cable/Life and Fitness
Apertura 2012-Clausura 2014	Silver Sports Wear	Caja Popular Mexicana/Coca-Cola/Corona Extra/Cemento Monterrey/Nivada
Apertura 2014	Keuka	Grupo Rotoplas/Corona Extra/State of Guanajuato/Pollo Feliz/Jimsa Electrónica
Clausura 2015	Keuka	Aeroméxico/Nivada/Corona Extra/State of Guanajuato/Pollo Feliz/Jimsa Electrónica
Apertura 2017–Clausura 2018	Keuka	Comex/Corona Extra/Casa Inn Hotels/Bachoco/Pollo Feliz/Jimsa Electrónica/Electrolit/Leche León/California Milk
2018–19	Silver Sports Wear	Comex/Izzi/Lotería Nacional/Pronosticos/The Home Depot/Jimsa Electrónica/Pollo Feliz/Azteca Tax Service
2019–20	Silver Sports Wear	Healthy People/Pollo Feliz/Servicio Rápido/TVCU4TRO
2020–21*	Keuka	Healthy People/Pollo Feliz/TVCU4TRO/Servicio Rápido/Caliente.mx/Life & Fitness/Jimsa Electrónica/Universidad Quetzalcoátl Irapuato/H-E-B/Salud Digna
2023-24	Silver Sports Wear	TVCU4TRO/Healthy People/Pollo Feliz/Tonic Music Multimedia/Astrid Spa
Apertura 2024	JAG Sportswear	Healthy People/TVCU4TRO/Pollo Feliz/Tonic Music Multimedia
Clausura 2025*	uin mx	TVCU4TRO/Healthy People/Pollo Feliz/Tonic Music Multimedia/MG Motor
Apertura 2025-	Keuka	Chay Printer/Healthy People/Tonic Music Multimedia/Toniclife Group/Pollo Feliz/Chilchota Alimentos/Corona Extra/Kia/Red Cola
Clausura 2026*	Keuka	Chay Printer/Healthy People/Tonic Music Multimedia/Toniclife Group/Pollo Feliz/Chilchota Alimentos/Corona Extra/Kia/Red Cola
Apertura 2026-	Keuka	TBA

== Managers ==
Season	Manager	Notes
Apertura 2007	(Argentina) Eduardo Bacas	
Clausura 2008	(Mexico) Martin Manjarrez Herrera	Originally from Irapuato, Guanajuato
Apertura 2008-Clausura 2009	(Mexico) Ricardo Rayas	Left midway through the Clausura 2009 season
Clausura 2009-Clausura 2010	(Mexico) Teodoro Orozco	Orozco was the Assistant Manager of the team, but took charge of the Team when Rayas left.
Clausura 2010	(Argentina) Osvaldo Batocletti	
Clausura 2010	(Mexico) Juan Alvarado Martin	
Apertura 2010	(Argentina) Luis Scatolaro	
Apertura 2010	(Mexico) Carlos Turrubiates	
Clausura 2011	(Mexico) Ignacio Rodriguez	Lead the team to the 2011 promotional Final Against Club Tijuana
2011	(Mexico) Omar Arellano Nuño	
2011-2012	(Mexico) Ricardo Rayas	
2012	(Mexico) Teodoro Orozco	
2012	(Mexico) Héctor Medrano	
June 2014–15	(Mexico) Roberto Sandoval	
2015	(Mexico) Jorge Manrique	
July 2015–May 2016	(Mexico) Ernesto Sosa	
June 2016–May 2018	(Mexico) Luis Alberto Padilla Velasco	Lead the team to the Apertura 2016 and Clausura 2017 Final Against Tlaxcala and Apertura 2017 Final Against Tepatitlán
August 2018–May 2019	(Mexico) Carlos Bracamontes	
July 2019–April 2020	(Mexico) Omar Arellano	
June 2020–December 2020	(Mexico) Juan Manuel Rivera	
December 2020–August 2021	(Mexico) Javier San Román	Club president between June 2020 and December 2020. Won the 2020–21 Liga Premier de México season against Cruz Azul Hidalgo.
August 2021	(Mexico) Marco Antonio Trejo	
June 2023–February 2024	(Mexico) Luis Fernando Soto	
February 2024–June 2025	(Mexico) Víctor Medina	Won the Clausura 2025 against Aguacateros de Peribán
July 2025–June 2026	(Mexico) Daniel Alcántar	Lead the team to the Apertura 2025 Final Against Jaiba Brava
June 2026–	(Uruguay) Luis Almada	

== Supporters ==
Irapuato FC Official Supporter group are Los Hijos de la Mermelada which translates to The Children of the Jam in English

== Rivalries ==
=== El Clásico del Bajio ===
- Irapuato vs. Leon

Irapuato's most fierce rivalry according to the fans is against León, named after both of the teams region "Clásico del Bajio".

=== El Derby ===
- Irapuato vs. Salamanca

Irapuato also have other Rivals such as Celaya team in Guanajuato.

== Personnel ==
=== Coaching staff ===
Position	Staff
Manager	(Uruguay) Luis Almada
Assistant managers	(Uruguay) Sergio Migliaccio (Uruguay) Diego Badala
Goalkeepers coach	TBC
Fitness coach	(Mexico) Antonio Silva
Team doctor	(Mexico) Enrique Hernández

== Players ==
=== First-team squad ===
As of 5 September 2026

Note: Flags indicate national team as defined under FIFA eligibility rules; some limited exceptions apply. Players may hold more than one non-FIFA nationality.

No.	Pos.	Nation	Player
1	GK	USA	Romeo Padrón
2	DF	MEX	Alejandro Morales
3	DF	MEX	Víctor Aguiar
4	DF	MEX	Rolando Flores
5	MF	MEX	Axel Pérez
6	MF	MEX	Johan Arriaga
7	FW	MEX	Emanuel Montejano
9	FW	MEX	Erick Sandoval
10	MF	MEX	Francisco Martínez
11	FW	MEX	Jacobo Alatorre
13	MF	MEX	Manuel Barrientos
14	FW	MEX	Arturo Hernández
15	MF	MEX	Gael Villaseñor
16	GK	MEX	Joshua Nava

No.	Pos.	Nation	Player
17	DF	MEX	Tito García
19	FW	MEX	Ángel Collazo
20	DF	MEX	Yahir Zamora
21	FW	MEX	Heriberto de la Rosa
22	MF	MEX	Brian Rocha
23	DF	MEX	Noé Sánchez
29	FW	MEX	Maximiliano Reyes
30	GK	MEX	Emilio Aguirre
31	DF	MEX	Juan Aranda
32	DF	MEX	Francisco Sarabia
33	MF	MEX	José Zorrero
34	GK	MEX	Víctor Juárez
44	FW	COL	Jehan Arcila
50	MF	MEX	Luis Araujo

== Notable players ==
- For all Irapuato players with a Wikipedia article see Category:Club Irapuato players.

Argentina

- (Argentina) Cristián Ariel Morales
- (Argentina) Ariel González
- (Argentina) Alejandro Sabella
- (Argentina) Antonio Mohamed
- (Argentina) Carlos Alberto Etcheverry
- (Argentina) Jorge Luis Gabrich
- (Argentina) Marcelo Espina
- (Argentina) Arnaldo Sialle
- (Argentina) Ezequiel Brítez
- (Argentina) Roberto Nicolás Saucedo

Brazil

- (Brazil) Marcelo de Faria

Chile

- (Chile) Juvenal Olmos
- (Chile) Reinaldo Navia

Colombia

- (Colombia) Neider Morantes

Costa Rica

- (Costa Rica) Rónald Gómez
- (Costa Rica) Óscar Emilio Rojas
- (Costa Rica) José Luis Soto
- (Costa Rica) Mauricio Solís

Ecuador

- (Ecuador) Édison Méndez

Honduras

- (Honduras) Ninrrol Medina

Jamaica

- (Jamaica) Peter Isaacs

Japan

- (Japan) Kenji Fukuda

Mexico

- (Mexico) Jorge Manrique
- (Mexico) Jaime Belmonte
- (Mexico) Cuauhtémoc Blanco
- (Mexico) Isaac Terrazas
- (Mexico) Fernando Arce
- (Mexico) Samuel Máñez
- (Mexico) Teodoro Orozco
- (Mexico) José Luis López
- (Mexico) Francisco Rotllán
- (Mexico) Adrián Martínez
- (Mexico) Mario Méndez
- (Mexico) Juan de Dios Ramírez Perales
- (Mexico) Rafael Márquez Esqueda
- (Mexico) Felipe Zetter
- (Mexico) Ligorio López
- (Mexico) Paulo Cesar Chávez
- (Mexico) José Cruz Gutiérrez
- (Mexico) Alfonso Blanco
- (Mexico) José Joel González
- (Mexico) Felipe Quintero

Paraguay

- (Paraguay) Aldo Adorno
- (Paraguay) Denis Caniza
- (Paraguay) Lorenzo Calonga
- (Paraguay) Aureliano Torres

Peru

- (Peru) Germán Carty

United States

- (United States) Yari Allnutt

Uruguay

- (Uruguay) Martín Rodríguez Alba
- (Uruguay) Gonzalo Pizzichillo
- (Uruguay) Álvaro Pintos
- (Uruguay) Carlos Miloc

Zambia

- (Zambia) Kalusha Bwalya

== Honours ==
Domestic
Type	Competition	Titles	Seasons	Runners-up
Top level FMF	Copa México	0	—	1955–56
Lower levels FMF	Liga de Expansión MX	0	—	Ape–2025
Lower levels FMF	Primera División 'A'	4^{s}	Inv–1999, Ver–2000, Inv–2002, Cla–2011	Ape–2008, Ape–2009
Lower levels FMF	Campeón de Ascenso	2^{s}	2000, 2003	2011
Lower levels FMF	Segunda División/Liga Premier	4	1953–54, 1984–85, 2020–21, Cla–2025	1972–73, 1974–75, 1977–78, 1993–94, Ape–2016, Cla–2017, Ape–2017, Ape–2024
Lower levels FMF	Copa México Segunda División/Copa de la Liga Premier de Ascenso	3	1950–51, 1952–53, 1953–54	Ape–2013, Cla–2014
Lower levels FMF	Campeón de Campeones de la Segunda División/Liga Premier	1	1954	1953, 2025

Notes

- record
- ^{s} shared record

== Reserves ==
=== Pénjamo-Irapuato ===
The team was based in Pénjamo, Guanajuato, and participated in the Segunda División, finishing as runners-up in the Clausura 2006 tournament, losing to Pegaso Anáhuac 5–4 on penalties.

=== Irapuato Olimpo ===
The team was based in Xochimilco, Mexico City and competed in the Group VI of the Liga TDP.

=== Irapuato B ===
The team competes in the Liga Premier (Premier B).
