= Adrián Martínez (Mexican footballer) =

Mexican footballer (born 1970)

Adrian Martínez
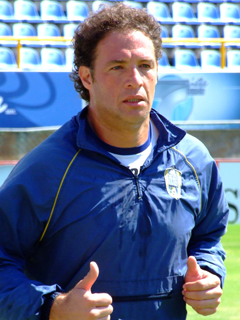

Personal information
- Full name: Adrián Martínez Flores
- Date of birth: 7 January 1970 (age 56)
- Place of birth: Mexico City, Mexico
- Height: 1.91 m (6 ft 3 in)
- Position: Goalkeeper

Senior career*
Years	Team	Apps	(Gls)
1992–1998	León	77	(0)
1998–2003	Santos Laguna	188	(0)
2003–2004	Necaxa	29	(0)
2004–2005	Santos Laguna	35	(0)
2005–2010	San Luis	120	(0)
2010–2011	Irapuato	44	(0)
Total		493	(0)

International career
2000–2002	Mexico	4	(0)

Managerial career
- 2014: Zacatepec (Interim)
- 2022: León (women)
Medal record
Representing Mexico
Runner-up	Copa America	2001
- * Club domestic league appearances and goals

Adrián Martínez Flores (born 7 January 1970) is a Mexican former footballer who last played as a goalkeeper for Irapuato FC.

He previously played for San Luis F.C. in the Primera División (First Division).

He was capped by the Mexico national football team on four occasions, making his debut in 2000 and playing his last game in 2002.

He retired from professional football in 2011 after being relegated to the Irapuato bench.

== Honours ==
Irapuato

- Liga de Ascenso: Clausura 2011

Mexico

- Copa América runner-up: 2001
