= Miguel Valdés =

Miguel Valdes or Valdés may refer to:

- Miguel Valdes (born 1940), Cuban former sports shooter
- Miguel Valdés (footballer) (1867–1951), Spanish gymnast and footballer

== See also ==
- Miguel Valdez (born 1984), Mexican former footballer
- Miguel Valdez Barn
