= Ezequiel Brítez =

Argentine footballer

Ezequiel Britez
Personal information
- Full name: Ezequiel David Britez
- Date of birth: 25 June 1985 (age 41)
- Place of birth: Rosario, Argentina
- Height: 1.85 m (6 ft 1 in)
- Position: Center back

Team information
- Current team: SHB Đà Năng
- Number: 45

Senior career*
Years	Team	Apps	(Gls)
2006–2007	Estudiantes de La Plata		
2007	Nueva Chicago		
2008–2009	Irapuato	25	(2)
2009	Rangers		
2010–2011	Irapuato	50	(1)
2011–2012	Millonarios	4	(0)
2012–2013	Talleres de Córdoba	7	(0)
2014	Real Garcilaso	0	(0)
2014–2017	Altamira	25	(0)
2017	SHB Da Nang	23	(3)
2020–2022	Atlético Carcarañá		
- * Club domestic league appearances and goals

Ezequiel David Brítez (born 25 June 1985) is an Argentine former footballer.

== Honours ==
=== Club ===
Irapuato

- Liga de Ascenso:
  - Winners (1): Clausura 2011

Estudiantes de La Plata

- Primera División de Argentina:
  - Winners (1): Torneo Apertura 2006

Talleres

- Torneo Argentino A:
  - Winners (1): 2012–13 Torneo Argentino A
