= Margarito González =

Mexican footballer (born 1979)

Personal information
- Full name: Margarito González Manzanares
- Date of birth: 3 March 1979 (age 47)
- Place of birth: Cruz Grande, Guerrero, México
- Height: 1.74 m (5 ft 9 in)
- Position: Defender

Senior career*
Years	Team	Apps	(Gls)
2001–2002	La Piedad	7	(0)
2002–2010	Querétaro	163	(15)
2004	→ Cruz Azul (loan)	9	(1)
2004–2005	→ Club Celaya (loan)	34	(0)
2007	→ Dorados (loan)	13	(0)
2010–2012	Irapuato	55	(0)
2022	Halcones de Querétaro	0	(0)
- * Club domestic league appearances and goals as of October 19, 2012

Margarito González Manzanares (born 3 March 1979) is a Mexican former football defender.

== Career ==
González made his professional debut with Reboceros de la Piedad in 2001. Although he has not been playing because of joaquin Beltran's experience he was once called for the national soccer team in Mexico. According to FIFA, he is the Mexican soccer player with the hardest kick in soccer history. In 2012 Gonzalez took time off due to depression, after making a free kick hitting Cruz Azul's defender Marco Bueno, and leaving him in the hospital for five months. Margarito went back to play with Querétaro FC.

== Honours ==
=== Club ===
Irapuato

- Liga de Ascenso:
  - Winners: Clausura 2011
