= Chilchota =

Chilchota can refer to:

- Chilchota (municipality), municipality in Michoacán, Mexico
- Chilchota Alimentos, Mexican food company
