= 1984–85 Mexican Segunda División season =

Segunda División de México
- Season: 1984–85
- Champions: Irapuato (2nd Title)
- Promoted: Santos Laguna; UAQ; San Mateo Atenco
- Relegated: Nuevo Necaxa; Zamora; Yucatán
- Matches played: 398
- Goals scored: 1,047 (2.63 per match)
- Top goalscorer: Raúl Paredes (25 goals)

The 1984–85 Segunda División was the 36th season of the Mexican Segunda División. The season started on 24 August 1984 and concluded on 23 June 1985. It was won by Irapuato.

== Changes ==
- Zacatepec was promoted to Primera División.
- Unión de Curtidores was relegated from Primera División.
- Santos Laguna and UAQ were promoted from Segunda División B.
- San Mateo Atenco was promoted from Tercera División.
- La Piedad, UABJ Oaxaca and SUOO were relegated from Segunda División.

=== During the season ===
- After Week 8, Veracruz was sold to new owners, the team was relocated at Mérida, Yucatán and renamed as Yucatán.

== Teams ==
1984–85 season Teams

Club	City	Stadium
Cobras	Querétaro City	Estadio Municipal de Querétaro; Estadio Corregidora
Colima	Colima City	Estadio Colima
Córdoba	Córdoba	Estadio Rafael Murillo Vidal
Irapuato	Irapuato	Estadio Irapuato
Jalisco	Guadalajara	Estadio Jalisco
Nuevo Necaxa	Amecameca	Estadio Francisco Flores
Pachuca	Pachuca	Estadio Revolución Mexicana
Poza Rica	Poza Rica	Estadio Heriberto Jara Corona
Salamanca	Salamanca	Estadio El Molinito
San Mateo Atenco	San Mateo Atenco	Estadio Municipal San Mateo Atenco
Santos Laguna	Torreón	Estadio Moctezuma
Tecomán	Tecomán	Estadio IAETAC
Tepic	Tepic	Estadio Nicolás Álvarez Ortega
Texcoco	Texcoco	Estadio Municipal de Texcoco
Tulancingo	Tulancingo	Estadio Primero de Mayo
Unión de Curtidores	León	Estadio La Martinica
UAQ	Querétaro City	Estadio Municipal de Querétaro; Estadio Corregidora
UAT	Ciudad Victoria	Estadio Marte R. Gómez
Veracruz	Veracruz City	Estadio Luis "Pirata" Fuente
Yucatán	Mérida	Estadio Carta Clara
Zamora	Zamora	Estadio Municipal de Zamora

== Western Zone ==
=== Group 1 ===
Pos	Team	Pld	W	D	L	GF	GA	GD	Pts	Qualification or relegation
1	Unión de Curtidores (Q)	36	19	6	11	57	41	+16	57	Qualified to Playoffs
2	Jalisco (Q)	36	16	9	11	48	40	+8	53	Qualified to Playoffs
3	Colima	36	9	11	16	34	43	−9	35	
4	Santos Laguna	36	10	10	16	40	52	−12	33	Relegation Group
5	Zamora	36	10	7	19	32	45	−13	32	Relegation Group

Source: RSSSF
(Q) Qualified for the phase indicated

=== Group 2 ===
Pos	Team	Pld	W	D	L	GF	GA	GD	Pts	Qualification or relegation
1	Irapuato (Q)	36	17	11	8	54	29	+25	58	Qualified to Playoffs
2	UAQ (Q)	36	19	5	12	47	34	+13	58	Qualified to Playoffs
3	Tepic	36	18	8	10	72	50	+22	57	
4	Tecomán	36	13	7	16	47	67	−20	41	
5	Salamanca	36	7	10	19	41	71	−30	28	Relegation Group

Source: RSSSF
(Q) Qualified for the phase indicated

=== Results ===
First leg

Home \ Away	COL	IRA	JAL	SAL	SAN	TEC	TEP	UDC	UAQ	ZAM
Colima	—	1–1	0–1	4–1	3–0	1–1	2–1	1–3	1–2	1–0
Irapuato	2–0	—	2–0	3–0	0–0	4–0	3–1	2–1	0–1	1–0
Jalisco	2–0	1–5	—	2–0	4–1	1–1	2–2	1–0	0–1	0–0
Salamanca	0–0	1–1	3–1	—	2–1	5–1	1–1	1–2	1–5	3–1
Santos Laguna	1–1	3–3	1–0	1–1	—	1–1	2–2	2–1	0–1	1–0
Tecomán	1–2	3–1	1–3	2–1	4–1	—	5–1	0–3	2–0	2–1
Tepic	2–0	1–1	1–0	3–2	3–2	1–0	—	3–0	2–0	3–0
Unión de Curtidores	2–1	0–0	1–0	1–1	1–1	3–2	4–1	—	1–0	1–1
UAQ	2–1	0–0	0–1	3–1	3–0	0–0	3–4	0–2	—	2–0
Zamora	1–0	0–2	0–1	1–1	1–0	3–1	1–3	1–0	1–3	—

Source: RSSSF
Legend: Blue = home team win; Yellow = draw; Red = away team win.

Second leg

Home \ Away	COL	IRA	JAL	SAL	SAN	TEC	TEP	UDC	UAQ	ZAM
Colima	—	3–0	1–1	1–1	0–0	0–1	1–0	1–3	0–1	1–1
Irapuato	3–0	—	3–1	2–0	1–0	4–0	1–2	2–0	1–1	2–1
Jalisco	1–1	2–1	—	0–0	1–1	6–0	2–1	4–2	1–0	0–2
Salamanca	0–1	1–1	3–1	—	1–1	1–0	0–3	1–3	1–0	1–3
Santos Laguna	2–1	2–1	0–1	2–0	—	4–0	2–1	2–0	1–0	0–1
Tecomán	0–2	0–0	1–1	3–1	2–1	—	1–0	2–0	4–1	2–1
Tepic	1–1	0–0	4–2	7–1	4–3	6–0	—	1–3	1–1	2–0
Unión de Curtidores	3–0	2–0	0–0	3–1	4–1	3–2	3–1	—	0–0	1–0
UAQ	2–1	1–0	0–2	3–1	2–0	3–1	0–2	3–0	—	2–1
Zamora	0–0	0–1	1–2	4–2	1–0	1–1	1–1	2–1	0–1	—

Source: RSSSF
Legend: Blue = home team win; Yellow = draw; Red = away team win.

== Eastern Zone ==
=== Group 3 ===
Pos	Team	Pld	W	D	L	GF	GA	GD	Pts	Qualification or relegation
1	Pachuca (Q)	36	19	12	5	65	22	+43	66	Qualified to Playoffs
2	UAT (Q)	36	18	10	8	70	44	+26	61	Qualified to Playoffs
3	Texcoco	36	14	12	10	48	41	+7	52	
4	Córdoba	36	11	12	13	42	47	−5	44	
5	Tulancingo	36	10	14	12	36	44	−8	40	

Source: RSSSF
(Q) Qualified for the phase indicated

=== Group 4 ===
Pos	Team	Pld	W	D	L	GF	GA	GD	Pts	Qualification or relegation
1	Cobras (Q)	36	17	12	7	66	41	+25	59	Qualified to Playoffs
2	Poza Rica (Q)	36	9	17	10	39	43	−4	40	Qualified to Playoffs
3	San Mateo Atenco	36	10	8	18	47	69	−22	34	
4	Veracruz/Yucatán	36	6	14	16	36	73	−37	29	Relegation Group
5	Nuevo Necaxa (R)	36	7	7	22	34	59	−25	26	Relegated

Source: RSSSF
(Q) Qualified for the phase indicated; (R) Relegated

=== Results ===
First leg

Home \ Away	COB	COR	NEC	PAC	PZR	SMA	TEX	TUL	UAT	VYU
Cobras	—	2–0	0–1	2–0	2–0	1–1	1–0	1–1	1–2	2–1
Córdoba	0–0	—	1–0	1–1	1–1	2–0	1–1	0–1	0–2	5–0
Nuevo Necaxa	1–3	0–2	—	1–1	3–1	1–2	1–2	0–0	0–1	0–1
Pachuca	4–0	1–1	1–0	—	2–1	2–0	2–1	0–0	3–1	6–0
Poza Rica	1–1	0–1	5–1	0–0	—	1–0	1–2	2–2	3–1	3–0
San Mateo Atenco	0–3	1–2	0–1	0–1	2–2	—	0–1	3–3	4–2	5–4
Texcoco	1–1	4–2	1–0	1–2	1–1	4–2	—	2–0	0–0	1–1
Tulancingo	0–0	0–1	1–0	0–2	0–0	2–0	1–3	—	0–0	2–1
UAT	1–1	2–0	5–0	3–1	4–1	4–1	5–0	3–0	—	4–1
Veracruz - Yucatán	0–0	1–4	0–0	1–1	1–2	3–1	0–1	3–3	1–1	—

Source: RSSSF
Legend: Blue = home team win; Yellow = draw; Red = away team win.

Second leg

Home \ Away	COB	COR	NEC	PAC	PZR	SMA	TEX	TUL	UAT	YUC
Cobras	—	2–1	5–1	1–1	2–0	4–3	2–0	3–0	3–1	10–3
Córdoba	0–4	—	2–2	1–1	0–0	1–1	2–2	4–0	0–2	3–1
Nuevo Necaxa	2–2	0–1	—	1–3	1–1	1–2	1–0	4–1	2–3	1–0
Pachuca	3–0	3–0	2–0	—	6–0	0–2	5–0	0–0	2–0	5–0
Poza Rica	2–1	2–1	0–0	1–1	—	3–1	2–1	0–0	1–1	1–1
San Mateo Atenco	2–2	2–0	0–4	1–0	1–1	—	1–0	2–1	2–2	2–0
Texcoco	3–0	5–0	2–1	0–0	0–0	3–1	—	1–1	2–0	0–0
Tulancingo	1–2	1–0	3–1	1–3	1–0	3–0	1–1	—	2–0	3–0
UAT	4–2	1–1	3–2	0–0	1–0	4–1	2–1	1–1	—	2–2
Yucatán	0–0	1–1	2–0	1–0	0–0	1–1	1–1	1–0	3–2	—

Source: RSSSF
Legend: Blue = home team win; Yellow = draw; Red = away team win.

== Final stage ==
=== Group 1 ===
Pos	Team	Pld	W	D	L	GF	GA	GD	Pts	Promotion	PAC	UDC	UAQ	PZR
1	Pachuca (Q)	6	4	2	0	7	1	+6	13	Qualified to Final		2–0	2–0	1–0
2	Unión de Curtidores	6	3	1	2	6	6	0	9		1–1		2–1	2–0
3	UAQ	6	2	1	3	7	5	+2	7		0–1	2–0		4–0
4	Poza Rica	6	0	2	4	0	8	−8	2		0–0	0–1	0–0	

Source: RSSSF
Rules for classification: 1st points; 2nd head-to-head points; 3rd head-to-head goal difference; 4th head-to-head goals scored; 5th goal difference; 6th number of goals scored
(Q) Qualified for the phase indicated

=== Group 2 ===
Pos	Team	Pld	W	D	L	GF	GA	GD	Pts	Promotion	IRA	COB	JAL	UAT
1	Irapuato (Q)	6	4	1	1	10	3	+7	12	Qualified to Final		1–0	3–0	3–0
2	Cobras	6	2	2	2	9	8	+1	7		2–1		2–2	4–1
3	Jalisco	6	1	3	2	8	10	−2	6		0–1	1–1		2–0
4	UAT	6	1	2	3	7	13	−6	5		1–1	2–0	3–3	

Source: RSSSF
Rules for classification: 1st points; 2nd head-to-head points; 3rd head-to-head goal difference; 4th head-to-head goals scored; 5th goal difference; 6th number of goals scored
(Q) Qualified for the phase indicated

=== Final ===
June 16, 1985

Irapuato	2–1	Pachuca
	Report

Estadio Irapuato, Irapuato

June 23, 1985

Pachuca	2–3	Irapuato
	Report

Estadio Revolución Mexicana, Pachuca

== Relegation Group ==
Pos	Team	Pld	W	D	L	GF	GA	GD	Pts	Promotion	SAN	SAL	ZAM	YUC
1	Santos Laguna	6	3	2	1	8	3	+5	11			3–0	3–1	0–0
2	Salamanca	6	4	0	2	7	7	0	10		1–0		2–1	2–0
3	Zamora (R)	6	2	2	2	15	7	+8	8	Relegated	1–1	3–1		9–0
4	Yucatán (R)	6	0	2	4	0	13	−13	2	Relegated	0–1	0–1	0–0	

Source: RSSSF
Rules for classification: 1st points; 2nd head-to-head points; 3rd head-to-head goal difference; 4th head-to-head goals scored; 5th goal difference; 6th number of goals scored
(R) Relegated
