= Ignacio Rodríguez (footballer, born 1956) =

Mexican footballer (1956–2025)

Personal information
- Full name: Ignacio Rodríguez Bahena
- Date of birth: 12 July 1956
- Place of birth: Zacatepec de Hidalgo, Morelos, Mexico
- Date of death: 19 May 2025 (aged 68)
- Place of death: Zacatepec de Hidalgo, Morelos, Mexico
- Height: 1.80 m (5 ft 11 in)
- Position: Goalkeeper

Senior career*
Years	Team	Apps	(Gls)
1977–1981	Zacatepec	107	(0)
1981–1982	Monarcas Morelia	18	(0)
1982–1989	Atlante	184	(0)
1992–1994	Tigres UANL	26	(0)
Total		335	(0)

International career
1980–1986	Mexico	11	(0)

Managerial career
- 1999–2003: Necaxa (assistant)
- 2003: Correcaminos (assistant)
- 2008: Salamanca (assistant)
- 2008: Chiapas (assistant)
- 2009–2011: Irapuato (assistant)
- 2011: Irapuato
- 2011–2012: Correcaminos
- 2012: Veracruz
- 2013: Lobos BUAP
- 2014–2015: Zacatepec
- 2018: Cuautla
- 2023: Oaxaca (Assistant)
- 2023: Orgullo Reynosa (assistant)
- * Club domestic league appearances and goals

Ignacio Rodríguez Bahena (12 July 1956 – 19 May 2025) was a Mexican professional football player and manager. A goalkeeper, he was part of the Mexican side as substitute in the 1986 FIFA World Cup. He died from cancer on 19 May 2025, at the age of 68.

== See also ==
- List of people from Morelos
