= Jorge Manrique (footballer) =

Mexican footballer (born 1979)

Personal information
- Full name: Jorge Manrique Islas
- Date of birth: 18 June 1979 (age 47)
- Place of birth: Mexico City, Mexico
- Height: 1.76 m (5 ft 9 1/2 in)
- Position: Midfielder

Team information
- Current team: UNAM U-21 (Assistant)

Senior career*
| Years | Team | Apps | (Gls) |
| 2002–2003 | Jaguares de Tapachula | | |
| 2003–2010 | Chiapas | | |
| 2007–2008 | → Salamanca (on loan) | | |
| 2008–2010 | → Irapuato (on loan) | | |
| 2010–2012 | Irapuato | | |
| 2012–2013 | → Veracruz (on loan) | | |
| 2013–2014 | → Atlético San Luis (on loan) | | |

Managerial career
- 2014: Atlético San Luis Premier (Assistant)
- 2015: Irapuato
- 2016: Murciélagos
- 2020–2021: Oaxaca (Assistant)
- 2021: Oaxaca (Interim)
- 2022–2023: Oaxaca
- 2023–2024: Municipal Grecia (Assistant)
- 2024: Municipal Grecia (Interim)
- 2025–: UNAM Reserves and Academy
- * Club domestic league appearances and goals

Jorge Manrique Islas (born 18 June 1979) is a Mexican former footballer who last played for Irapuato and is currently manager of Liga de Expansión MX club Oaxaca.
