= Samuel Máñez =

Mexican footballer (1972-2002)

- Samuel Mánez circa 2001

Personal information
- Full name: Jose Samuel Máñez Reyes
- Date of birth: 13 December 1972
- Place of birth: Tenexpa, Guerrero, Mexico
- Date of death: 26 December 2002 (aged 30)
- Place of death: Xalapa, Veracruz, Mexico
- Height: 1.77 m (5 ft 9 1/2 in)
- Position: Goalkeeper

Senior career*
Years	Team	Apps	(Gls)
1995	Atlante	2	(0)
1997–1999	Real Zacatecas	40	(0)
2000–2002	Irapuato	43	(0)
2002	Veracruz	31	(0)
- * Club domestic league appearances and goals as of October 1, 2012 ‡ National team caps and goals as of October 1, 2012

Samuel Máñez (December 13, 1972 - December 26, 2002), was a Mexican footballer, known as San Máñez (Saint Máñez), in reference to his death, he was considered a saint to many fans.

== Career ==
Born in Guerrero, Máñez began playing semi-professional football at the age of 18 with Barracudas de Acapulco in the third Division he went on a try out to Atlas but returned to Acapulco to play with Delfines de Acapulco. in 1995 Acapulco played a match vs first division team Atlante and from there Atlante's Manager Ricardo La Volpe saw potential in him and took young Mañez to the team. his debut in the First Division was September 24, 1995 vs Toros Neza, game in which they lost 0–3.

At the end of the season, Mañez was sent to Pumas UNAM, but nothing was established and he had to return to Acapulco. He did not find a team and Samuel Mañez took the decision of going to the United States for a better life and to forget about soccer, but he soon returned and he returned to play soccer with Real Sociedad de Zacatecas of the Primera División A, He made it to the Final in his first year back but lost.

Mañez was brought to Irapuato and played for Irapuato FC. He was a vital role in Irapuato's promotion in 2000. He was considered to be one of Irapuato's best players.

== Honours ==
Real Zacatecas

- Primera División A: runner-up Invierno 1997

Irapuato

- Primera División A: Verano 2000

== Death ==
Máñez died in a car accident on the México-Veracruz highway on 26 December 2002, after returning to his club from the Christmas holiday season. A girl was also killed in the accident, which left Máñez' wife and two children injured.
