= Luis Scatolaro =

Argentinean footballer

Personal information
- Full name: Luis Américo Scatolaro Benítez
- Date of birth: 12 February 1963 (age 63)
- Place of birth: Argentina
- Position: Forward

Senior career*
Years	Team	Apps	(Gls)
-1979	Boca Juniors	1	(1)
	Club Atlético Belgrano	5+	(2+)
1989-1990	Chaco For Ever	26	(7)
1990-1991	C.D. Irapuato		
1991-1994	Club Necaxa		
1995-1998	C.D. Irapuato		
- * Club domestic league appearances and goals

Luis Scatolaro (born 12 February 1963, in Argentina) is an Argentinean retired footballer.
