= Teodoro Orozco =

Mexican footballer (born 1963)

Personal information
- Full name: Teodoro Orozco Puente
- Date of birth: 22 October 1963 (age 63)
- Place of birth: Concordia, Coahuila, Mexico
- Position: Defender

Senior career*
Years	Team	Apps	(Gls)
1982–1983	Puebla	43	(0)
1983–1989	Irapuato	114	(1)
1990–1994	Monterrey	72	(0)
1994–1995	Irapuato	23	(0)

International career
1985	Mexico U20	4	(0)

Managerial career
- 2007: Irapuato (assistant)
- 2008–2010: Irapuato
- 2011: Bravos de Nuevo Laredo
- 2012–2013: Irapuato
- 2016–2017: Alacranes Rojos de Apatzingán
- 2019–2020: Salamanca
- 2020–2021: Cocodrilos Lázaro Cárdenas
- 2021–2025: Delfines de Abasolo
- * Club domestic league appearances and goals

Teodoro Orozco Puente (born 22 October 1963) is a Mexican former football defender and manager. He is commonly known as Teo Orozco by players and fans.

Teodoro Orozco was a squad member at the 1985 FIFA World Youth Championship held in the Soviet Union, where he played four games.

He scored his first goal for Irapuato in a 1–1 draw vs Atletico Potosino on 31 August 1986

== International Caps ==
Teodoro Orozco's Caps for Mexico in 1985

International appearances
#	Date	Venue	Opponent	Result	Competition
1.	August 24, 1985	Vladimir Lenin Stadium, Baku, Soviet Union	China	3-1	1985 FIFA World Youth Championship
2.	August 27, 1985	Vladimir Lenin Stadium, Baku, Soviet Union	Paraguay	2-0	1985 FIFA World Youth Championship
3.	August 29, 1985	Vladimir Lenin Stadium, Baku, Soviet Union	England	1-0	1985 FIFA World Youth Championship
4.	September 1, 1985	Vladimir Lenin Stadium, Baku, Soviet Union	Nigeria	1–2	1985 FIFA World Youth Championship

== Honours ==
=== Club ===
Puebla F.C.

- Primera División de Mexico:
  - Winners (1): 1982–83

Irapuato F.C.

- Segunda División de México:
  - Winners (1): 1984–85

Monterrey F.C.

- Primera División de Mexico:
  - Winners (1): 1992–93
