= Comex Group =

Mexican paint manufacturer

Grupo Comex, S.A. de C.V.
- Type: Private (Limited liability)
- Founded: 1959; 67 years ago
- Headquarters: Mexico City, Mexico
- Key people: Henrik Bergström CEO
- Products: Paint and waterproofing products
- Revenue: US$1.2 billion
- Number of employees: 2,344
- Parent: PPG Industries
- Website: www.comex.com.mx

Comex Group is the fourth largest paint manufacturer and distributor of paints and waterproofing products in North America, with 3,300 locations.

== History ==
The Sherwin-Williams Company (SHW), the largest U.S. paint retailer, agreed in November 2012 to acquire closely held Consorcio Comex SA de CV for about $2.34 billion including debt to gain Mexico's largest paint maker. The deal was rejected by Mexico's Comisión Federal de Competencia in November 2013 for antitrust purposes, and a result of such, PPG Industries has agreed to buy Comex for $2.3 billion Sherwin-Williams was still able to purchase Comex' operations in the United States and Canada for $165 million. After the failed bid in Mexico, and before the take-over by PPG, Comex sued Sherwin-Williams for not trying hard enough to seal the deal.

In July 2015, after the photo of president Enrique Peña Nieto showing his height difference next to Felipe VI of Spain made the international headlines, Comex released on its Twitter account a photoshopped photo of the Mexican president standing on one of its paint pots with the text "una pintura de altura" (a paint of stature). After the post got widely retweeted, the company deleted it and made an official apology, arguing that the photo had not been approved before it went live.

== Activity ==
Comex sells paint and coatings. As of 2013, the company distributed its products through 234 Comex stores in the United States, 80 Comex stores and 1500 external retailers in Canada. It also operates five manufacturing sites in the US and three in Canada. In January 2016, Comex opened its 4,000th store in Mexico.
