= Nivada =

Swiss watch company

Nivada Grenchen
- Industry: Watchmaking
- Founded: 1879
- Founder: Jacob Schneider
- Website: nivadagrenchenofficial.com

Nivada Grenchen is a Swiss watch manufacturing company, founded in the town of Grenchen, Switzerland in 1879 by Jacob Schneider. The company gained attraction after World War II, producing a series of successful watches before succumbing to the Quartz crisis.

== History ==
In 1926, Nivada was operational in Grenchen as Wüllimann Schneider Nivada S.A. The company relied on proven movements from ETA SA and Phénix S.A., as was typical at the time, and the company was known for quality mass-produced watches. Nivada celebrated its 100th anniversary in 1979, at which point it was run by Max Schneider, the son of the founder, who took over the business in 1976.

Nivada was prevented from using its name during the 1960s and 1970s due to its phonetic similarity with Movado, so the products were labeled "Nivada Grenchen". In the United States, Croton (formed in 1878 in Italy, later headquartered in New Jersey) became a U.S. distributor for Nivada products, so many were sold under the "Croton Nivada", "Croton Nivada Grenchen", and simply "Croton" names, avoiding the issues with the similarity to the Movado name.

The Nivada brand was also used in South Korea by the Kim Suk Keun Watch Company from 1985 through the 2000s and continues to be used to this day.

As of 2022, Nivada is still incorporated in Grenchen, Switzerland and the brand continues in some markets, notably in Mexico.

== Products ==
- Rollamatic (also "Rollador") using Phenix 200 movements.
- Reglavit was a water-resistant watch with an external regulator screw.
- Antarctic was a long-running series of watches initiated in 1958 in celebration of the International Geophysical Year (IGY), and using the ETA 1256 or 2472 movements, as well as the A. Schild 1673.
- Depthmaster was a diving watch, water-resistant up to 1,000 meters.
- Depthomatic was another diving watch, water-resistant to 200 M, and using the ETA 2472 movement.
- Alertamatic was an alarm watch using the Lemania 2980 movement.
- Ultramatic 36000 (1975) used the rare 36,000 A/h ETA 2734 movement. Due to their close relation to Phenix/MSR, Nivada sold the Vulcain Cricket alarm watch under their brand as the Wanderer.
