= Arturo Alvarado =

Mexican footballer (born 1987)

Personal information
- Full name: Arturo Alvarado Pérez
- Date of birth: 17 August 1987 (age 39)
- Place of birth: Monterrey, Nuevo León, Mexico
- Height: 1.76 m (5 ft 9 in)
- Position: Midfielder

Youth career
- Monterrey

Senior career*
| Years | Team | Apps | (Gls) |
| 2006–2008 | Monterrey | 15 | (1) |
| 2007 | → Querétaro (loan) | 4 | (2) |
| 2009–2010 | → San Luis (loan) | 12 | (0) |
| 2010 | → Indios (loan) | 5 | (0) |
| 2010–2011 | Irapuato | 7 | (1) |
| 2012–2013 | Merída | 25 | (1) |
| 2013–2015 | Correcaminos UAT | 44 | (5) |
| 2015–2017 | Zacatepec | 55 | (7) |
| 2017–2019 | Atlético San Luis | 18 | (0) |
| 2019–2021 | Alebrijes de Oaxaca | 3 | (0) |

Managerial career
- 2022: Oaxaca (Liga TDP) (Assistant)
- 2022–2024: Oaxaca (Assistant)
- 2024: Oaxaca (Interim)
- 2025: Oaxaca
- * Club domestic league appearances and goals

Arturo Alvarado Pérez (born 17 August 1987) is a Mexican professional football coach and a former player.
