= 2010–11 Liga de Ascenso season =

Season of a Mexican football league

Liga de Ascenso
- Season: 2010–11
- Champions: Apertura: Tijuana; Clausura: Irapuato
- Promoted: Tijuana
- Relegated: None

The 2010–11 Ascenso MX season is the second season of the Liga de Ascenso, the second-level football league of Mexico. It consists of two separate tournaments, the Apertura and the Clausura. The winners of both tournaments will meet in a playoff to determine the team being promoted to the 2011–12 Primera Division de Mexico season.

The Apertura tournament began on July, 16th 2010 with the first matches of the classification phase and ended on December, 4th 2010 with the Apertura Liguilla final. The final was won by Tijuana, who defeated Veracruz 3–0 on aggregate.

The Clausura tournament began on January, 7th 2011 and ended on May, 14th 2011. The final was won by Irapuato, who defeated Tijuana. The following week, Apertura champion Tijuana defeated Clausura champion Irapuato in a playoff to determine the team promoted to the 2011–12 Liga MX season. That playoff took place on 18 May 2011 and May, 21st 2011.

== Changes for the 2010–2011 season ==
- Altamira won promotion from Segunda División de México.
- There was no demotion to Segunda División
- Indios was demoted from Primera Division de Mexico
- Necaxa won promotion to Primera División.
- Potros Neza was rebranded Atlante UTN
- Guerreros de Hermosillo were suspended after the 2010 Apertura for not paying players.

== Stadia and locations ==
Locations of the Liga de Ascenso 2010–11 teams

Club	Location	Stadium	Capacity
Altamira	Altamira	Altamira	9,581
Atlante UTN	Nezahualcóyotl	Neza 86	20,000
Lobos BUAP	Puebla	ODCU	19,283
Indios	Ciudad Juárez	Olímpico Benito Juárez	19,703
Cruz Azul Hidalgo	Ciudad Cooperativa Cruz Azul	10 de Diciembre	14,500
Durango	Durango	Francisco Zarco	18,000
Guerreros	Hermosillo	Héroe de Nacozari	18,747
Irapuato	Irapuato	Sergio León Chávez	25,000
La Piedad	La Piedad	Juan N. López	13,356
León	León	Nou Camp	31,297
Mérida	Mérida	Carlos Iturralde	15,087
Orizaba	Veracruz	Luis de la Fuente	28,703
Pumas Morelos	Cuernavaca	Centenario	14,800
Dorados de Sinaloa	Culiacán	Banorte	17,898
Tijuana	Tijuana	Caliente	13,333
Correcaminos	Ciudad Victoria	Marte R. Gómez	10,520
U. de G.	Guadalajara	Jalisco	55,020
Veracruz	Veracruz	Luis de la Fuente	28,703

== Apertura 2010 ==
Apertura
- Season: 2010
- Champions: Tijuana
- Matches: 126
- Goals: 314 (2.49 per match)
- Top goalscorer: Eder Pacheco (13 goals)
- Biggest home win: U. de G. 6–0 Mérida
- Biggest away win: Potros Neza 1–5 Orizaba
- Highest scoring: UDG 6–0 Mérida; Potros Neza 1–5 Orizaba; Potros Neza 4–2 Léon
- Longest winning run: Durango, Lobos BUAP (3 games each)
- Longest unbeaten run: Tijuana (15 games)
- Longest losing run: Léon (5 games)

=== Standings ===
Pos	Team	Pld	W	D	L	GF	GA	GD	Pts	Qualification
1	Tijuana	17	11	5	1	19	7	+12	38	Qualification for Liguilla semifinals
2	Indios	17	8	5	4	32	27	+5	29	Qualification for Liguilla quarterfinals
3	Durango	17	8	4	5	24	19	+5	28	Qualification for Liguilla quarterfinals
4	Lobos BUAP	17	8	3	6	23	13	+10	27	Qualification for Liguilla quarterfinals
5	Veracruz	17	7	6	4	25	18	+7	27	Qualification for Liguilla quarterfinals
6	Irapuato	17	8	3	6	23	22	+1	27	Qualification for Liguilla quarterfinals
7	Orizaba	17	7	4	6	21	15	+6	25	Qualification for Liguilla quarterfinals
8	Léon	17	7	4	6	26	21	+5	25	
9	Guerreros	17	6	7	4	19	21	−2	25	
10	Altamira	17	6	6	5	23	20	+3	24	
11	Dorados de Sinaloa	17	6	5	6	22	26	−4	23	
12	Cruz Azul Hidalgo	17	5	7	5	19	16	+3	22	
13	Pumas Morelos	17	4	8	5	16	21	−5	20	
14	U. de G.	17	5	4	8	26	30	−4	19	
15	La Piedad	17	4	6	7	21	28	−7	18	
16	Correcaminos	17	3	6	8	14	18	−4	15	
17	Merida	17	3	4	10	13	27	−14	13	
18	Potros Neza	17	2	3	12	17	34	−17	9	

Updated to match(es) played on 14 November 2010. Source: MedioTiempo
Rules for classification: 1) points; 2) goal difference; 3) number of goals scored.

=== Results ===
Home \ Away	ALT	BUP	CIU	CAH	DUR	GUE	IRA	LAP	LEÓ	MER	ORI	PTN	PUM	SIN	TIJ	UAT	UDG	VER
Altamira			2–2						1–0	2–0	1–3	2–1	3–0			1–1	2–0	0–1
BUAP	0–1		2–0		0–1							4–1	1–1	4–0		2–1	2–0	
Ciudad Juárez						5–1			1–0	3–2	2–1	3–2	3–3		1–0	1–2		
Cruz Azul Hidalgo	1–1	0–1	1–1		0–0							2–0	1–0	4–2			3–1	
Durango	4–2		1–1								1–0	1–0	1–2	3–1		0–2	2–1	2–2
Guerreros	2–2	1–0		1–0	0–0		1–2	2–1						1–1	0–0			0–2
Irapuato	3–2	1–0	0–2	2–1	0–2							2–1		1–0			3–4	
La Piedad	1–1	4–1	2–2	2–2	1–4		1–4							2–1			4–0	
León		3–1		1–0	3–1	2–3	1–1	1–1						3–0	1–2			2–2
Mérida		0–1		1–2	2–1	1–1	1–0	0–2	2–3						0–0			0–1
Orizaba		0–0		1–1		2–1	0–1	3–1	0–0	2–1					0–1			
Potros Neza						1–2		0–0	4–2	1–1	1–5		1–2		1–2	1–0		
Pumas Morelos						0–0	1–1	1–1	0–2	0–0	1–0				1–2	1–0		
Sinaloa	0–0		2–0							2–0	2–1	2–1	2–0			2–2	2–2	3–2
Tijuana	1–0	1–1		1–0	2–0		2–1	1–0						0–0			1–0	2–0
UAT				0–0		0–1	3–1	0–1	1–2	0–2	0–0				1–1			
U. de G.			3–1			2–2			1–0	6–0	1–2	1–1	1–1			2–1		1–3
Veracruz		1–0	3–4	1–1			0–0	2–0			0–1	3–0	2–2			0–0		

Updated to match(es) played on 14 November 2010. Source: MedioTiempo.com
Legend: Blue = home team win; Yellow = draw; Red = away team win.

=== Apertura Liguilla ===
Quarterfinals
2	Indios	0	0	0
7	Orizaba	1	1	2
4	Veracruz	1	1	2
5	Lobos BUAP	1	0	1
3	Durango	0	3	3
6	Irapuato	2	2	4

Semifinals
1	Tijuana	0	0	0
7	Orizaba	0	0	0
4	Veracruz	0	3	3
6	Irapuato	2	1	3

Finals
1	Tijuana	2	1	3
2	Veracruz	0	0	0

- If the two teams are tied after both legs, the higher seeded team advances.
- Teams are re-seeded every round.
- The winner will qualify to the playoff match vs the Clausura 2011 winner. However, if the winner is Tijuana, they are the team promoted to the 2011–12 Primera Division de Mexico season without playing the Promotional Final

==== Quarter-finals ====
Team 1	Agg.	Team 2	1st leg	2nd leg
Indios	0–2	Orizaba	0–1	0–1
Veracruz	2–1	Lobos BUAP	1–1	1–0
Durango	3–4	Irapuato	0–2	3–2

===== First leg =====
17 November 2010	Orizaba	1–0	Indios	Boca del Río
19:00	J. Cavallo 29'	Report		Stadium: Estadio Luis "Pirata" Fuente; Attendance: 1,800; Referee: Víctor Bisguerra Mendiola

17 November 2010	Irapuato	2–0	Durango	Irapuato
20:45	A. Alvarado 46'; C. Blanco 81'	Report		Stadium: Estadio Sergio León Chávez; Attendance: 23,000; Referee: León Vicente Barajas Anzures

18 November 2010	Veracruz	1–1	Lobos BUAP	Boca del Río
19:00	F. Bravo 72'	Report	J. Sara 82'	Stadium: Estadio Luis "Pirata" Fuente; Attendance: 7,500; Referee: Erick Yaír Miranda Galindo

===== Second leg =====
20 November 2010	Durango	3–2 (3–4 agg.)	Irapuato	Durango
19:00	E. Pacheco 1', 10', 32'	Report	J. López 23'; A. González 80'	Stadium: Estadio Francisco Zarco; Attendance: 20,000; Referee: Jorge Antonio Pérez Durán

20 November 2010	Indios	0–1 (0–2 agg.)	Orizaba	Ciudad Juárez
19:00 MST / 20:00 CST		Report		Stadium: Estadio Olímpico Benito Juárez; Attendance: 17,000; Referee: Antony Zanjuampa Rojo

21 November 2010	Lobos BUAP	0–1 (1–2 agg.)	Veracruz	Puebla
17:00		Report	G. Rojas 12'	Stadium: Estadio Cuauhtémoc; Attendance: 20,000; Referee: Mario Alonso Villa García

==== Semi-finals ====
Team 1	Agg.	Team 2	1st leg	2nd leg
Tijuana	0–0	Orizaba	0–0	0–0
Veracruz	3–3	Irapuato	0–2	3–1

===== First leg =====
25 November 2010	Orizaba	0–0	Tijuana	Boca del Río
19:00		Report		Stadium: Estadio Luis "Pirata" Fuente; Attendance: 9,500; Referee: Víctor Bisguerra Mendiola

25 November 2010	Irapuato	2–0	Veracruz	Irapuato
20:50	A. González 5'; J. López 60'	Report		Stadium: Estadio Sergio León Chávez; Attendance: 24,000; Referee: León Vicente Barajas Anzures

===== Second leg =====
28 November 2010	Tijuana	0–0 (0–0 agg.)	Orizaba	Tijuana
13:00 PST / 15:00 CST		Report		Stadium: Estadio Caliente; Attendance: 14,000; Referee: Israel Perea Vázquez

28 November 2010	Veracruz	3–1 (3–3 agg.)	Irapuato	Boca del Río
19:00	A. Leyva 8'; F. Bravo 69'; J. García 73'	Report	L. Valdés 57'	Stadium: Estadio Luis "Pirata" Fuente; Attendance: 22,000; Referee: Antony Zanjuampa Rojo

==== Final ====
Team 1	Agg.	Team 2	1st leg	2nd leg
Tijuana	3–0	Veracruz	2–0	1–0

===== First leg =====
1 December 2010	Veracruz	0–2	Tijuana	Boca del Río
21:00		Report	M. Gerk 35'; J. Gandolfi 38'	Stadium: Estadio Luis "Pirata" Fuente; Attendance: 26,000; Referee: Israel Perea Vázquez

===== Second leg =====
4 December 2010	Tijuana	1–0 (3–0 agg.)	Veracruz	Tijuana
13:00 PST / 15:00 CST	R. Enríquez 55'	Report		Stadium: Estadio Caliente; Referee: 14,400

Apertura 2010 winner

1st title

=== Top goalscorers ===
Source: FeMexFut

Rank	Player	Club	Goals
1	(Mexico) Eder Pacheco	Durango	13
2	(Argentina) Juan Manuel Sara	Lobos BUAP	10
2	(Mexico) Miguel Zepeda	U. de G.	10
4	(Argentina) Juan Manuel Cavallo	Orizaba	9
4	(Mexico) Eduardo Lillingston	Indios	9
4	(Mexico) Roberto Nurse	Cruz Azul Hidalgo	9
7	(Chile) Felipe Flores	Dorados de Sinaloa	8
7	(Uruguay) Nelson Maz	Veracruz	8
7	(Mexico) Rafael Murguía	La Piedad	8
10	(Mexico) Jared Borgetti	León	6
10	(Mexico) Mauricio Romero	Veracruz	6

== Clausura 2011 ==
Clausura
- Season: 2011
- Champions: Irapuato
- Matches: 148
- Goals: 346 (2.34 per match)
- Top goalscorer: Blas Pérez (14 goals)

=== Standings ===
Pos	Team	Pld	W	D	L	GF	GA	GD	Pts	Qualification
1	Léon (A)	16	10	4	2	30	16	+14	34	Qualification for Liguilla semifinals
2	Irapuato (A)	16	10	3	3	28	16	+12	33	Qualification for Liguilla quarterfinals
3	Potros Neza (A)	16	8	5	3	19	12	+7	29	Qualification for Liguilla quarterfinals
4	Tijuana (A)	16	7	5	4	23	18	+5	26	Qualification for Liguilla quarterfinals
5	Veracruz (D)	16	7	5	4	18	14	+4	26	Disqualified for the Clausura Liguilla (Note: Veracruz have been disqualified due to accumulate debts that have not been paid. Therefore Dorados de Sinaloa have been given the qualification place left.)
6	Cruz Azul Hidalgo (A)	16	6	6	4	24	18	+6	24	Qualification for Liguilla quarterfinals
7	Correcaminos (A)	16	7	3	6	25	21	+4	24	Qualification for Liguilla quarterfinals
8	Dorados de Sinaloa (A)	16	6	6	4	22	21	+1	24	Qualification for Liguilla quarterfinals
9	Altamira	16	6	3	7	17	22	−5	21	
10	Indios	16	6	2	8	14	20	−6	20	
11	Pumas Morelos	16	6	1	9	18	24	−6	19	
12	Orizaba	16	4	6	6	15	17	−2	18	
13	Merida	16	3	7	6	17	21	−4	16	
14	La Piedad	16	3	6	7	14	21	−7	15	
15	Lobos BUAP	16	4	3	9	26	34	−8	15	
16	U. de G.	16	2	8	6	20	24	−4	14	
17	Durango	16	3	3	10	16	27	−11	12	

Updated to match(es) played on 10 April 2011. Source: MedioTiempo
Rules for classification: 1) points; 2) goal difference; 3) number of goals scored.
(A) Advance to a further round; (D) Disqualified

=== Results ===
Home \ Away	ALT	BUP	CIU	CAH	DUR	IRA	LAP	LEÓ	MER	ORI	PTN	PUM	SIN	TIJ	UAT	UDG	VER
Altamira		2–2		0–0	2–1	1–2	1–0						1–0	1–0			
BUAP				2–4		3–1	2–2	2–3	2–1	2–1				1–2			0–1
Ciudad Juárez	2–1	1–0		1–1	1–2	1–2	2–0						0–2			2–1	1–0
Cruz Azul Hidalgo						0–0	1–1	2–1	5–1	0–0				1–2	2–2		1–2
Durango		2–4		0–1		2–3	0–1	2–0	1–1					0–2			
Irapuato							2–1	1–2	2–2	2–2		2–0		2–0	2–0		0–1
La Piedad								0–2	1–1	1–2	0–0	0–1		2–1	2–1		1–1
León	3–1		1–0						1–0	2–0	1–1	3–2			4–0	2–0	
Mérida	2–0		0–1							1–1	0–0	2–0	1–1		2–0	0–2	
Orizaba	0–1		1–0		1–0						0–1	2–0	2–3		0–1	2–2	1–1
Potros Neza	3–1	1–0	3–1	3–2	0–1	0–1							1–1			2–1	1–0
Pumas Morelos	1–2	4–1	0–0	1–2	4–2						0–2		2–1			1–0	2–1
Sinaloa		2–1		1–0	2–1		2–0	1–1						2–2			
Tijuana			2–1					3–3	2–2	0–0	2–0	2–0			2–1		
UAT	2–1	4–1	4–0		3–0						1–1	2–0	1–1			2–3	1–0
U. de G.	1–1	3–3		1–2	0–0	1–2	2–2						2–2	1–1			
Veracruz	3–1				2–2			1–1	2–1				2–1	1–0		0–0	

Updated to match(es) played on 24 April 2011. Source: SoccerWay
Legend: Blue = home team win; Yellow = draw; Red = away team win.

=== Clausura Liguilla ===
Quarterfinals
4	Tijuana	2	5	7
5	Cruz Azul Hidalgo	2	1	3
2	Irapuato	0	1	1
7	Dorados de Sinaloa	0	1	1
3	Potros Neza	1	1	2
6	UAT	1	0	1

Semifinals
1	León	0	0	0
4	Tijuana	1	2	3
2	Irapuato	0	2	2
3	Potros Neza	1	0	1

Finals
4	Tijuana	1	0	1
2	Irapuato	1	1	2

- If the two teams are tied after both legs, the higher seeded team advances.
- Teams are re-seeded every round.
- The winner will qualify to the playoff match vs Club Tijuana (the Apertura 2010 winner). However, if the winner is Tijuana, they are the team promoted to the 2011–12 Mexican Primera División season without playing the Promotional Final.

==== Quarter-finals ====
Team 1	Agg.	Team 2	1st leg	2nd leg
Irapuato	1–1	Dorados	0–0	1–1
Potros Neza	2–1	UAT	1–1	1–0
Tijuana	7–3	Cruz Azul Hidalgo	2–2	5–1

===== First leg =====
27 April 2011	Dorados	0–0	Irapuato	Culiacán
20:00 MDT / 21:00 CDT		Report		Stadium: Estadio Banorte; Attendance: 14,000; Referee: Baruch Absalón Castellanos

28 April 2011	Cruz Azul Hidalgo	2–2	Tijuana	Ciudad Cooperativa Cruz Azul
16:00	E. Marín 64', 66'	Report	J. Corona 12'; R. Enríquez 74'	Stadium: Estadio 10 de Diciembre; Attendance: 3,000; Referee: César Arturo Ramos Palazuelos

28 April 2011	UAT	1–1	Potros Neza	Ciudad Victoria
20:30	R. Morales 63'	Report	J. Atilano 58'	Stadium: Estadio Marte R. Gómez; Attendance: 17,500; Referee: Mario Alonso Villa García

===== Second leg =====
30 April 2011	Irapuato	1–1 (1–1 agg.)	Dorados	Irapuato
20:00	C. Blanco 76'	Report	F. Flores 38'	Stadium: Estadio Sergio León Chávez; Attendance: 18,000; Referee: Jorge Antonio Pérez Durán

1 May 2011	Potros Neza	1–0 (2–1 agg.)	UAT	Ciudad Nezahualcóyotl
12:00	D. Mejía 16'	Report		Stadium: Estadio Neza 86; Attendance: 6,000; Referee: César Esteban Moreno Roa

1 May 2011	Tijuana	5–1 (7–3 agg.)	Cruz Azul Hidalgo	Tijuana
13:00 PDT / 15:00 CDT	J. Yacuzzi 19', 84'; R. Enríquez 26'; M. Gerk 31'; A. Molina 35'	Report	J. García 85'	Stadium: Estadio Caliente; Attendance: 14,400; Referee: Óscar Macías Romo

==== Semi-finals ====
Team 1	Agg.	Team 2	1st leg	2nd leg
León	0–3	Tijuana	0–1	0–2
Irapuato	2–1	Potros Neza	0–1	2–0

===== First leg =====
4 May 2011	Tijuana	1–0	León	Tijuana
12:00 PDT / 14:00 CDT	A. Molina 69'	Report		Stadium: Estadio Caliente; Attendance: 14,000; Referee: Jorge Antonio Pérez Durán

4 May 2011	Potros Neza	1–0	Irapuato	Ciudad Nezahualcóyotl
15:45	L. Emílio 43'	Report		Stadium: Estadio Neza 86; Attendance: 22,000; Referee: César Arturo Ramos Palazuelos

===== Second leg =====
7 May 2011	Irapuato	2–0 (2–1 agg.)	Potros Neza	Irapuato
18:00	A. González 18'; J. Arellano 54'	Report		Stadium: Estadio Sergio León Chávez; Attendance: 20,000; Referee: Antony Zanjuampa Rojo

7 May 2011	León	0–2 (0–3 agg.)	Tijuana	León
20:00		Report	J. Abrego 19'; L. Orozco 66'	Stadium: Nou Camp; Attendance: 22,000; Referee: Israel Perea Vázquez

==== Final ====
Team 1	Agg.	Team 2	1st leg	2nd leg
Irapuato	2–1	Tijuana	1–1	1–0

===== First leg =====
11 May 2011	Tijuana	1–1	Irapuato	Tijuana
13:00 PDT / 15:00 CDT	A. Molina 60'	Report	L. Valdés 7'	Stadium: Estadio Caliente; Attendance: 14,000; Referee: César Arturo Ramos Palazuelos

===== Second leg =====
14 May 2011	Irapuato	1–0 (2–1 agg.)	Tijuana	Irapuato
19:00	J. Gutiérrez 85'	Report		Stadium: Estadio Sergio León Chávez; Attendance: 25,590; Referee: Óscar Macías Romo

Clausura 2011 winner

4th title

== Campeón de Ascenso 2011 ==
=== First leg ===
18 May 2011
20:30 (UTC-5)

Irapuato	0–0	Club Tijuana

Estadio Sergio León Chávez, Irapuato
Attendance: 25,000
Referee: César Arturo Ramos Palazuelos

=== Second leg ===
21 May 2011
15:00 (UTC-5)

Tijuana	2–1	Irapuato
Corona 28'; Gerk 31'		Molina 37' (own)

Estadio Caliente, Tijuana
Attendance: 14,400
Referee: César Arturo Ramos Palazuelos

Champions

1st title
