= Miguel Almazán =

Mexican footballer (born 1982)

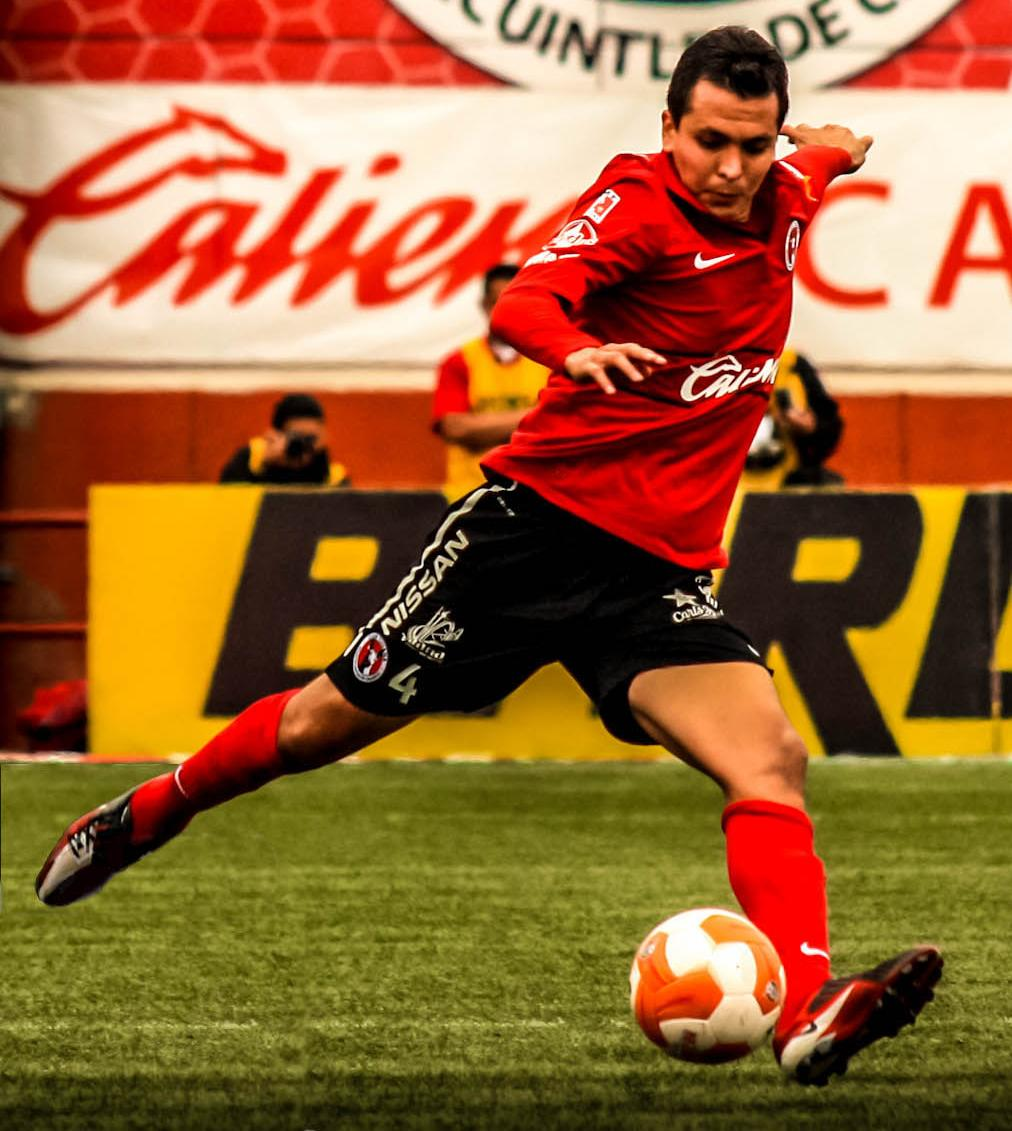

Personal information
- Full name: Miguel Ángel Almazán Quiróz
- Date of birth: 6 May 1982 (age 44)
- Place of birth: Mexico City, D.F., Mexico
- Height: 1.80 m (5 ft 11 in)
- Position: Defender

Youth career
- Toluca

Senior career*
Years	Team	Apps	(Gls)
2002–2016	Toluca	111	(3)
2010–2013	→ Tijuana (loan)	60	(0)
2016	→ Celaya (loan)	1	(0)

Managerial career
- 2017–2022: Toluca Reserves and Academy
- * Club domestic league appearances and goals

Miguel Ángel Almazán Quiróz (born 6 May 1982) is a Mexican football coach and a former defender. His original club Toluca debuted him on 20 April 2002 in a 2–2 tie against Cruz Azul.

== Honors ==
=== Toluca ===
- Primera División de México (4): Apertura 2002, Apertura 2005, Apertura 2008, Primera División de México Bicentenario 2010,

=== Tijuana ===
- Liga MX (1): Apertura 2012
