= Alejandro Molina =

Mexican footballer (born 1988)

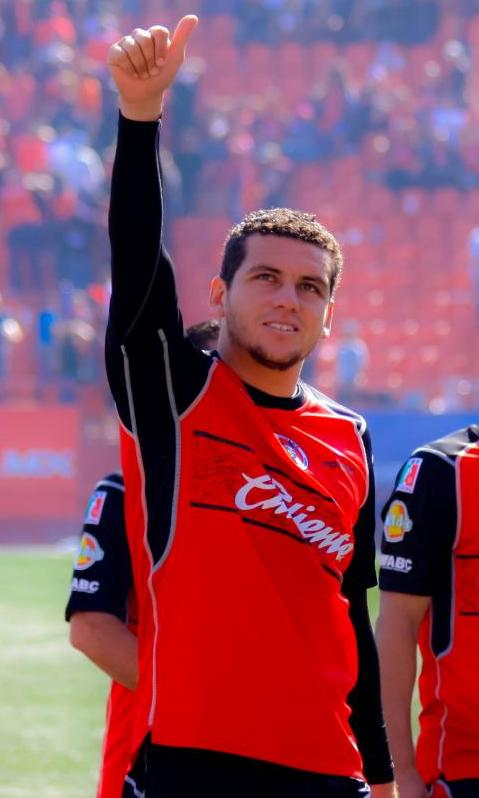

Personal information
- Full name: Alejandro Molina Núñez
- Date of birth: 21 July 1988 (age 38)
- Place of birth: Ensenada, Baja California, Mexico
- Height: 1.77 m (5 ft 9 1/2 in)
- Position: Defender

Youth career
- 2007–2009: Monterrey

Senior career*
| Years | Team | Apps | (Gls) |
| 2008–2012 | Monterrey | 1 | (0) |
| 2009–2010 | → Veracruz (loan) | 23 | (3) |
| 2010–2011 | → Tijuana (loan) | 26 | (5) |
| 2012–2014 | Tijuana | 15 | (0) |
| 2013 | → Correcaminos (loan) | 3 | (0) |
| 2013–2014 | → Mérida (loan) | 26 | (6) |
| 2015 | → Dorados (loan) | 21 | (1) |
| 2015 | → Necaxa (loan) | 4 | (0) |
| 2019–2020 | Dorados de Sinaloa | 1 | (0) |
| 2020 | Halcones de Zapopan | 0 | (0) |
- * Club domestic league appearances and goals as of 30 August 2020 (UTC)

Alejandro Molina (born 21 July 1988) is a former Mexican footballer, who last played for Dorados de Sinaloa. He was earlier under investigation for an incident occurred in a parking lot of a bar.

== Club career ==
=== Club Tijuana ===
In 2009, Molina was loaned to Veracruz because the lack of games played. In 2010, he was loaned again, but now to Club Tijuana Xoloitzcuintles De Caliente. In 2010, he helped Tijuana obtain the Apertura 2010 champions. Then on May 21, 2011, his team advanced to the Primera División.

=== Dorados de Sinaloa ===
Molina played for Dorados de Sinaloa, and helped the team win the Ascenso MX and were promoted to first division.

=== Club Necaxa ===
For the Apertura 2015–16, Molina was loaned from Monterrey to Ascenso MX team, Club Necaxa. On 15 August 2015, Molina and teammate Luis Gorocito were arrested and taken to prison, after being involved in a fight in a parking lot bar that same night. On August 16, Club Necaxa announced that they have suspended both players for an unlimited time until the problem had been solved. Media reported that the players could face up to 8 years in prison.

=== Atlético Ensenada ===
On 17 July 2020, Molina joined Atlético Ensenada from the Liga de Balompié Mexicano.

== Career statistics ==
As of 25 September 2014

| Club | Season | League | | | FA Cup | | Other^{[A]} | | Total | |
| Club | Season | Division | Apps | Goals | Apps | Goals | Apps | Goals | Apps | Goals |
|---|---|---|---|---|---|---|---|---|---|---|
| Monterrey II | 2008–09 | Ascenso MX | 32 | 7 | 0 | 0 | 0 | 0 | 32 | 7 |
| Total | | | 32 | 7 | 0 | 0 | 0 | 0 | 32 | 7 |
| Monterrey | 2008–09 | Mexican Primera División | 1 | 0 | 0 | 0 | 0 | 0 | 1 | 0 |
| Monterrey | 2012–13 | Liga MX | 0 | 0 | 0 | 0 | 1 | 0 | 1 | 0 |
| Veracruz (loan) | 2009–10 | Ascenso MX | 23 | 3 | 0 | 0 | 0 | 0 | 23 | 3 |
| Tijuana (loan) | 2010–11 | Liga de Ascenso | 26 | 5 | 0 | 0 | 0 | 0 | 26 | 5 |
| Tijuana (loan) | 2011–12 | Mexican Primera División | 15 | 0 | 0 | 0 | 0 | 0 | 15 | 0 |
| Monterrey Total | | | 1 | 0 | 0 | 0 | 1 | 0 | 2 | 0 |
| Correcaminos | 2012–13 | Ascenso MX | 3 | 0 | 3 | 1 | 0 | 0 | 6 | 1 |
| Total | | | 3 | 0 | 3 | 1 | 0 | 0 | 6 | 1 |
| Mérida | 2013–14 | Ascenso MX | 28 | 6 | 4 | 1 | 0 | 0 | 32 | 7 |
| Tijuana (loan) | 2014–15 | Liga MX | 0 | 0 | 5 | 0 | 0 | 0 | 5 | 0 |
| Mérida Total | | | 28 | 6 | 4 | 1 | 0 | 0 | 32 | 7 |
| Career totals | | | 128 | 21 | 12 | 2 | 1 | 0 | 141 | 23 |

A. The "Other" column constitutes appearances and goals (including substitutes) in the 2012–13 CONCACAF Champions League.

== Titles ==
| Season | Club | Title |
|---|---|---|
| Liga de Ascenso 2011 | Tijuana | Ascenso 2011 |
