= Miguel Valdez =

Mexican footballer (born 1991)

Personal information
- Full name: Miguel Ángel Valdéz Espinoza
- Date of birth: 18 August 1984 (age 42)
- Place of birth: Torreon, Coahuila, Mexico
- Height: 1.80 m (5 ft 11 in)
- Position: Defender

Senior career*
Years	Team	Apps	(Gls)
2005–2010	Veracruz	45	(0)
2010	→ Alacranes de Durango (loan)	17	(1)
2011	Tijuana	2	(0)
2012	Dorados de Sinaloa	3	(0)
- * Club domestic league appearances and goals

Miguel Ángel Valdéz Espinoza (Note: In this Spanish name, the first or paternal surname is Valdéz and the second or maternal family name is Espinoza.) (born 18 August 1984) is a Mexican former footballer.

== Club career ==
=== Club Tijuana ===
In 2010, Miguel started playing for the Club Tijuana Xoloitzcuintles De Caliente. In 2010, he helped Tijuana obtain the Apertura 2010 champions. Then on 21 May 2011, his team advanced to the Primera División.

== Titles ==
Season	Club	Title
2011	Tijuana	Campeón de Ascenso
