= Joshua Abrego =

Mexican footballer (born 1986)

Joshua Ábrego
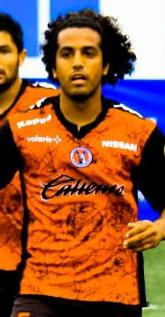

Personal information
- Full name: Joshua Emmanuel Ábrego Mortera
- Date of birth: 15 November 1986 (age 39)
- Place of birth: San Juan Evangelista, Veracruz, Mexico
- Height: 1.78 m (5 ft 10 in)
- Position: Defender

Senior career*
Years	Team	Apps	(Gls)
2004	Delfines de Coatzacoalcos	3	(0)
2004–2006	Guerreros de Tabasco		
2007–2016	Tijuana	197	(5)
2013–2016	→ Dorados (loan)	44	(1)
2016–2017	Murciélagos	4	(0)
- * Club domestic league appearances and goals

Joshua Emmanuel Ábrego Mortera (Note: In this Spanish name, the first or paternal surname is Ábrego and the second or maternal family name is Mortera.) (born 15 November 1986) is a Mexican former footballer.

== Club career ==
=== Club Tijuana ===
In 2008, Joshua Ábrego started playing for Club Tijuana. In 2010, he helped Tijuana obtain the Ascenso MX Apertura 2010 championship by defeating Veracruz 3–0 on aggregate score. Then on 21 May 2011, his team won the Ascenso MX promotion final after beating Club Irapuato 2–1 on aggregate score and advanced to Liga MX. In 2012, he obtained the Apertura 2012 championship of Liga MX after defeating Toluca 4–1 on aggregate score.

=== Dorados ===
On May 23, 2015, Dorados was promoted to the Liga MX after defeating Necaxa 3–1 on aggregate score.

== Honours ==
=== Club ===
Tijuana

- Campeón de Ascenso: 2011
- Liga MX Apertura 2012
