= Chilchota Alimentos =

Mexican dairy company

Chilchota Alimentos, S.A. de C.V.

- Company type: Private
- Industry: Dairy
- Founded: 1968; 58 years ago
- Headquarters: Gómez Palacio, Durango, Mexico
- Products: Cheese, Yogurt, Cream, Margarine, Candies and Juices
- Website: www.chilchota.com

Chilchota Alimentos is a dairy company founded in 1968 in Gómez Palacio, Durango, Mexico, by the Herrera Brothers. It manufactures cheese, yogurt, cream, margarine, candies and juices.

The company is named after Chilchota, Michoacan, the hometown of the father of its founders.
