= 2012–13 Irapuato FC season =

Irapuato FC
2012–13 season
- Chairman: Roberto Martínez Calderón
- Manager: Héctor Medrano (December 2012-)
- Stadium: Estadio Sergio León Chávez
- Apertura 2012: 11^{th.} (did not reach playoffs)
- Clausura 2013: Season starts January 4, 2013 against Estudiantes Tecos
- Copa MX Apertura 2012: Group Stage
- Copa MX Clausura 2013: Group 3
- Top goalscorer: Apertura: Ariel González (7); Clausura: Orlindo Ayoví (1)
Home colours	Away colours	Third colours

The 2012–13 Irapuato season is the 18th professional season of Mexico's Promotion league. The season is split into two tournaments—the Torneo Apertura and the Torneo Clausura—each with identical formats and each contested by the same fifteen teams. Irapuato began their season in a 0–0 draw on July 20, 2012, against Tecos, Irapuato play their homes games in the Estadio Sergio León Chávez.

== Torneo Apertura 2012 ==
=== Squad ===
Note: Flags indicate national team as defined under FIFA eligibility rules; some limited exceptions apply. Players may hold more than one non-FIFA nationality.

No.	Pos.	Nation	Player
1	GK	MEX	Sergio Arias
2	DF	MEX	Ismael Rodríguez
4	DF	MEX	Daniel Valdez
5	MF	MEX	Ruben Alberto Garcia
6	DF	MEX	Francisco Razo
7	MF	BRA	Carlos Regis Araujo
8	MF	ARG	Walter Jiménez
9	FW	MEX	Íñigo Rey
10	FW	ARG	Eduardo Dos Santos (Captain)
11	FW	ARG	Ariel González (Vice Captain)
12	FW	MEX	José Valadéz
13	DF	MEX	Melvin Brown
14	MF	MEX	Carlos Balcázar
15	MF	MEX	Pedro Jiménez

No.	Pos.	Nation	Player
16	FW	MEX	Josue Perea
17	MF	MEX	Efraín Cruz
18	MF	MEX	Marco Reyna
20	DF	MEX	Melchor Cerda
21	FW	MEX	Luis Efrén Hernández
24	GK	GER	Manuel Corona
27	MF	MEX	Gerardo Gomez
28	FW	MEX	Jesus Romeo
33	DF	MEX	Leonardo Casanova
36	GK	MEX	Juan Cepellini Ceballos
37	MF	MEX	Javier Junyent
38	MF	MEX	Gustavo Guillen
40	FW	MEX	Abraham Avalos

=== Regular season ===
Win Draw Loss

==== Apertura 2012 results ====
July 20, 2012 Round 1	Tecos	0 – 0	Irapuato	Zapopan, Jalisco
20:00				Stadium: Estadio Tres de Marzo; Referee: Baruch Absalon Castellanos

July 28, 2012 Round 2	Irapuato	2 – 2	Pumas Morelos	Irapuato, Guanajuato
19:00	González 57' (pen.); Avalos 74'		Campos 41'; Morales 82'	Stadium: Estadio Sergio León Chávez; Referee: Jorge Luis Delgado

August 4, 2012 Round 3	Mérida	1 - 1	Irapuato	Mérida, Yucatán
18:00	Alfaro 86' (pen.)		Gomez 33'	Stadium: Estadio Carlos Iturralde; Referee: Obed Eluid Gomez

August 11, 2012 Round 4	Irapuato	1 - 1	Neza	Irapuato, Guanajuato
19:00	González 10' (pen.)		Jose Reyes 65'	Stadium: Estadio Sergio León Chávez; Referee: Carlos Manuel Martínez

August 17, 2012 Round 5	Necaxa	6 - 4	Irapuato	Aguascalientes, Aguascalientes
20:00	Lojero 6', 79', 44' (pen.); Santoya 65', 87'; Lacerda 15'		González 52'; Avalos 58'; Josue Perea 70'; Guillen 90+1'	Stadium: Estadio Victoria; Referee: Roberto Rios Jacome

August 25, 2012 Round 6	Irapuato	1 - 0	Correcaminos	Irapuato, Guanajuato
19:00	Daniel Valdéz 36'			Stadium: Estadio Sergio León Chávez; Referee: Leon Vicente Barajas

September 1, 2012 Round 7	Dorados	1 - 1	Irapuato	Culiacán, Sinaloa
19:00	Gustavo Ramírez 77'		González 60'	Stadium: Estadio Banorte; Referee: Quetzalli Alvarado Godinez

September 15, 2012 Round 8	Irapuato	0 - 1	Celaya	Irapuato, Guanajuato
19:00			Carlos Ramos 38'	Stadium: Estadio Sergio León Chávez; Referee: Arturo Cruz Hurtado

September 23, 2012 Round 9	La Piedad	0 - 1	Irapuato	La Piedad, Michoacán
16:00	Gomez 5'			Stadium: Estadio Juan N. López; Referee: Eduardo Galvan Basulto

September 29, 2012 Round 10	Irapuato	1 - 1	Veracruz	Irapuato, Guanajuato
19:00	González 41' (pen.)		Romero 57'	Stadium: Estadio Sergio León Chávez; Referee: Baruch Absalón Castellanos

October 7, 2012 Round 11	Cruz Azul Hidalgo	3 - 0	Irapuato	Jasso, Hidalgo
12:00			Valadéz 22', 89'; Omar Mendoza 41'	Stadium: Estadio 10 de Diciembre; Referee: Fernando Hernandez Gomez

October 13, 2012 Round 12	Irapuato	2 - 0	Lobos BUAP	Irapuato, Guanajuato
19:00	Rodríguez 38'; Jiménez 52'			Stadium: Estadio Sergio León Chávez; Attendance: 5,250; Referee: Erick Yair Miranda Galindo

October 19, 2012 Round 13	Altamira	2 - 1	Irapuato	Altamira, Tamaulipas
19:00	Oscar Fernández 1'; José Alberto Tovar 22'		Avalos 90+2'	Stadium: Estadio Altamira; Referee: Carlos Manuel Martinez Soto

November 2, 2012 Round 14	Leones Negros	1 - 1	Irapuato	Guadalajara, Jalisco
20:45	Campos 9'		Balcazar 49'	Stadium: Estadio Jalisco; Attendance: 2,942; Referee: Eduardo Galván

=== Goalscorers ===
Position	Nation	Name	Goals scored
1.	(Argentina)	Ariel Gonzalez	5
2.	(Mexico)	Abraham Avalos	3
3.	(Mexico)	Gerardo Gomez	2
4.	(Mexico)	Gustavo Guillen	1
5.	(Mexico)	Josue Perea	1
6.	(Mexico)	Daniel Valdéz	1
7.	(Mexico)	Ismael Rodríguez	1
8.	(Argentina)	Walter Jiménez	1
TOTAL			15

=== Results ===
==== Results summary ====
Overall								Home						Away					
Pld	W	D	L	GF	GA	GD	Pts	W	D	L	GF	GA	GD	W	D	L	GF	GA	GD
13	3	6	4	15	18	−3	15	2	3	1	7	5	+2	1	3	3	8	13	−5

Last updated: October 19, 2012.
Source: Apertura 2012 results

== Copa MX ==
=== Group stage ===
Win Draw Loss

==== Apertura results ====
July 25, 2012
19:00

Irapuato	3 – 2	Puebla
González 2', 90+1'; Jiménez 70'		Chávez 35'; De Buen 46'

Estadio Sergio León Chávez
Irapuato, Mexico
Referee: Uriel Olvera Ríos

August 1, 2012
21:00

Puebla	0 – 2	Irapuato
		Rey 75'; Balcázar 90'

Estadio Cuauhtémoc
Puebla, Mexico
Referee: Jorge Isaac Rojas Castillo

August 8, 2012
19:00

Irapuato	0 - 1	Toluca
		Benítez 43'

Estadio Sergio León Chávez
Irapuato, Mexico
Attendance: 6,300
Referee: Erick Yair Miranda

August 22, 2012
19:00

Toluca	4 - 1	Irapuato
Benítez 44', 78', 82'; Brambila 42'		Jose Valadéz 53'

Estadio Nemesio Díez
Toluca, Mexico
Referee: Antony Rojo

August 29, 2012
19:00

Lobos BUAP	4 - 0	Irapuato
Gutiérrez 59', 76'; Lima 14', 70'

Estadio Olímpico de C.U.
Puebla, Mexico
Referee: Marco Antonio Ortiz

September 18, 2012
21:00

Irapuato	2 - 1	Lobos BUAP
Josue Perea 53'; Avalos 88'		Íñiguez 43'

Estadio Sergio León Chávez
Irapuato, Mexico
Attendance: 2,122
Referee: Oscar Bernardo Villagómez

=== Goalscorers ===
Position	Nation	Name	Goals scored
1.	(Argentina)	Ariel González	2
2.	(Argentina)	Walter Jiménez	1
3.	(Mexico)	Íñigo Rey	1
4.	(Mexico)	Carlos Balcázar	1
5.	(Mexico)	José Valadéz	1
6.	(Mexico)	Josue Perea	1
7.	(Mexico)	Abraham Avalos	1
TOTAL			8

== Transfers ==
=== In ===
#	Pos	Nat	Player	From	Date
2	DF	(Mexico)	Ismael Rodríguez	Querétaro	June 2012
8	MF	(Argentina)	Walter Jiménez	Unattached	July 9, 2012
9	FW	(Mexico)	Íñigo Rey	Mérida	June 2012
10	MF	(Argentina)	Eduardo Dos Santos	La Piedad	June 2012
13	DF	(Mexico)	Melvin Brown	Cruz Azul Hidalgo	June 2012
14	MF	(Mexico)	Carlos Balcázar	Leones Negros	June 2012
4	DF	(Mexico)	Daniel Valdez	Querétaro	June 2012
5	MF	(Mexico)	Ruben Alberto Garcia	Estudiantes de Altamira	June 2012
33	DF	(Mexico)	Leonardo Casanova	Cruz Azul Hidalgo	June 2012
18	MF	(Mexico)	Marco Reyna	La Piedad	June 2012
20	DF	(Mexico)	Melchor Cerda	Dorados de Sinaloa	June 2012

=== Out ===
#	Pos	Nat	Player	To	Date
27	FW	(Mexico)	José Cruz Gutiérrez	Lobos de la BUAP	May 2012
23	DF	(Mexico)	Juan Carlos de la Barrera	Correcaminos UAT	May 2012
30	MF	(Mexico)	Gabino Velasco	Cruz Azul Hidalgo	May 2012
28	DF	(Mexico)	Leonel Olmedo	Querétaro	May 2012
2	DF	(Mexico)	Margarito González	TBD	May 2012
16	DF	(Mexico)	Mario Méndez	TBD	May 2012
21	GK	(Mexico)	Pedro Hernández Calderón	TBD	May 2012
8	MF	(Mexico)	Jorge Manrique	Veracruz	May 2012
4	DF	(Mexico)	Juan Carlos Arellano	Veracruz	May 2012
19	MF	(Mexico)	Jonathan Jair Miramontes	Veracruz	May 2012
9	FW	(Mexico)	Luis Alberto Valdés	Mérida	May 2012
18	MF	(Argentina)	Esteban Alberto González	TBD	May 2012

== Torneo Clausura 2013 ==
=== Squad ===
Note: Flags indicate national team as defined under FIFA eligibility rules; some limited exceptions apply. Players may hold more than one non-FIFA nationality.

No.	Pos.	Nation	Player
1	GK	MEX	Sergio Arias
2	DF	MEX	Ismael Rodríguez
3	DF	MEX	Cristian Zamudio
5	MF	MEX	Ruben Alberto Garcia
6	DF	MEX	Francisco Razo
7	FW	MEX	Luis Alberto Valdés
8	MF	MEX	Eduardo Barrón
9	FW	MEX	Íñigo Rey
10	MF	ARG	Walter Jiménez
11	FW	ARG	Ariel González (captain)
12	MF	MEX	Francisco Herrera
13	DF	MEX	Melvin Brown
14	MF	MEX	Carlos Balcázar
15	DF	MEX	Oscar Zea
16	FW	MEX	Josue Perea
17	FW	MEX	Efraín Cruz
18	MF	ARG	Damián Zamogilny

No.	Pos.	Nation	Player
19	MF	MEX	Ricardo Rocha
20	DF	MEX	Melchor Cerda
22	DF	MEX	Gandhi Vega
23	FW	ECU	Orlindo Ayoví
24	GK	GER	Manuel Corona
26	MF	MEX	Juan Carlos Silva
27	DF	MEX	Eduardo Zamora
28	FW	MEX	Jesus Romeo
29	DF	MEX	Leonel Olmedo
30	FW	MEX	Jonathan Hernández
33	DF	MEX	Leonardo Casanova
36	GK	MEX	Juan Cepellini Ceballos
37	MF	MEX	Javier Junyent
38	MF	MEX	Gustavo Guillen
39	MF	MEX	Osvaldo Laguna
40	FW	MEX	Abraham Avalos
-	MF	MEX	Gerardo Gomez

=== Regular season ===
Win Draw Loss

==== Clausura 2013 results ====
January 4, 2013 Round 1	Irapuato	1 - 0	Estudiantes Tecos	Irapuato, Guanajuato
20:30	Orlindo Ayoví 10'			Stadium: Estadio Sergio Leon Chavez; Attendance: 7,100; Referee: Erick Yair Miranda

January 12, 2013 Round 2	Pumas Morelos	3 - 0	Irapuato	Cuernavaca, Morelos
16:00				Stadium: Estadio Centenario

January 19, 2013 Round 3	Irapuato	0 - 1	Mérida	Irapuato, Guanajuato
19:00				Stadium: Estadio Sergio Leon Chavez

January 27, 2013 Round 4	Neza	1 - 0	Irapuato	Nezahualcóyotl, Mexico
12:00				Stadium: Estadio Neza 86

February 2, 2013 Round 5	Irapuato	1 - 1	Necaxa	Irapuato, Guanajuato
19:00				Stadium: Estadio Sergio Leon Chavez

February 8, 2013 Round 6	Correcaminos	3 - 1	Irapuato	Ciudad Victoria, Tamaulipas
20:30	Dos Santos 29'; Nurse 35'; Saucedo 52'; Alejandro Berber (yellow card) 74'	Summary	Arias (yellow card) 38'; Jonathan Hernández (yellow card) 68'; Ayoví 87' (pen.); Cristian Zamudio (yellow card) 90'	Stadium: Estadio Marte R. Gómez; Referee: Eduardo Galván

February 16, 2013 Round 7	Irapuato	0 - 0	Dorados	Irapuato, Guanajuato
19:00	Jiménez (yellow card) 30'; Vega (yellow card) 49'; Cristian Zamudio (yellow card) 90+2'	Summary	Gustavo A. Ramírez Rojas (yellow card) 4'; Carlos Pinto (yellow card) 41'; Javier Güemez (yellow card) 59'; López (yellow card) 69'; Lorenzo Ramírez (red card) 74'	Stadium: Estadio Sergio Leon Chavez; Referee: Baruch Castellanos

February 23, 2013 Round 8	Celaya	0 - 0	Irapuato	Celaya, Guanajuato
20:50	Barroche (yellow card) 34'	Summary		Stadium: Estadio Miguel Alemán; Referee: Roberto Ríos

March 2, 2013 Round 9	Irapuato	3 - 3	La Piedad	Irapuato, Guanajuato
19:00	González 25'; Ayoví 87', 90'	Summary	Santana 43'; Rojas 49'; Emmanuel Sánchez 88'	Stadium: Estadio Sergio Leon Chavez

March 9, 2013 Round 10	Veracruz	3 - 0	Irapuato	Veracruz, Veracruz
18:00	Castillo 16'; Pablo Torres 22' 34' (pen.); Jorge Sánchez (yellow card) 52'	Summary	Oscar Zea (yellow card) 46'	Stadium: Estadio Luis de la Fuente; Referee: Fernando Hernández

March 16, 2013 Round 11	Irapuato	1 - 2	Cruz Azul Hidalgo	Irapuato, Guanajuato
19:00	Jorge Laguna (yellow card) 25'; Razo (yellow card) 39'; Vega (yellow card) 55' (yellow-red card); González 59'	Summary	Omar Mendoza (yellow card) 12' (yellow-red card); Jairo Villeda (yellow card) 24'; Omar Mendoza (yellow card) 56'; Valadéz 56'; Hütt 83'; Carrasco (yellow card) 90+1'	Stadium: Estadio Sergio Leon Chavez; Referee: Angel Monroy

March 29, 2012 Round 12	Lobos BUAP	1 - 0	Irapuato	Puebla, Puebla
16:00	Daniel Valdéz 11'; Diego (yellow card) 38' (yellow-red card); Dudu Paraíba (yellow card) 71'; Alférez (yellow card) 83'; Íñigo (yellow card) 85'	Summary	Arias (yellow card) 83'; Oscar Zea (yellow card) 87'; Melchor Cerda (yellow card) 90+3'	Stadium: Estadio Olímpico de C.U. Referee: Israel Reyes

April 6, 2013 Round 13	Irapuato	0 - 2	Altamira	Irapuato, Guanajuato
20:00	Cristian Zamudio (yellow card) 77'	Summary	José Alberto Tovar (yellow card) 37'; Carlos Alberto Cuevas (yellow card) 46'; César Iván Sánchez (yellow card) 76'; César Rosario Morales 78' (yellow card) 89'; Luis Fernando Sánchez (yellow card) 80'; Felipe Alfredo Ríos (yellow card) 90+1'; Hugo Emiliano Rodríguez 90+3'	Stadium: Estadio Sergio Leon Chavez; Referee: León Barajas

April 20, 2013 Round 14	Irapuato	0 - 1	Leones Negros	Irapuato, Guanajuato
19:00		Summary	Strahman 20'	Stadium: Estadio Sergio Leon Chavez; Referee: Fernando Hernández

== Group 3 ==
Club	Pld	W	D	L	RG	GF	GA	GD	Pts
Cruz Azul	6	4	1	1	2	8	5	+3	13
Atlas	6	3	2	1	3	10	5	+5	11
Irapuato	6	1	3	2	1	8	7	1	6
Lobos BUAP	6	0	2	4	0	1	10	–9	2

== Matches ==
16 January 2013 Match 1	Irapuato	0 - 2	Atlas	Irapuato, Guanajuato
21:00	Gustavo Guillén (yellow card) 30'; Rodríguez (yellow card) 65'; Ricardo Rocha (yellow card) 72'; Eduardo Barrón (yellow card) 88'	Summary	Luis Télles 50'; Guillermo Martín (yellow card) 61'; Barraza 87' (yellow card) 87'	Stadium: Estadio Sergio León Chávez; Referee: Angel Monroy

23 January 2013 Match 2	Atlas	2 - 2	Irapuato	Guadalajara
17:00	Sandoval 29', 32'; Gallardo (yellow card) 51'; Guillermo Martín (red card) 74'	Summary	Ayoví 6' (pen.) (yellow card) 44'; Brown (yellow card) 18'; Razo (yellow card) 34'; Guillermo Martín 57' (o.g.)	Stadium: Estadio Jalisco; Referee: Victor Bisquerra

13 February 2013 Match 3	Cruz Azul	0 - 0	Irapuato	Mexico City
17:00	Bello (yellow card) 34'; Vela (yellow card) 77'	Summary	Rey (yellow card) 29'; Olmedo (yellow card) 70' (yellow-red card)	Stadium: Estadio Azul; Referee: Miguel Chacon

== Transfers ==
=== In ===
#	Pos	Nat	Player	From	Date
TBD	FW	(Ecuador)	Orlindo Ayoví	C.D Olmedo	December 26, 2012
TBD	MF	(Argentina)	Damián Zamogilny	Atlas	December 20, 2012
TBD	DF	(Mexico)	Juan Carlos Silva	San Luis	December 20, 2012
TBD	DF	(Mexico)	Leonel Olmedo	Querétaro	December 20, 2012
TBD	DF	(Mexico)	Gandhi Vega	Cruz Azul Hidalgo	December 14, 2012
TBD	MF	(Mexico)	Ricardo Elionai Rocha	Altamira	December 14, 2012
TBD	DF	(Mexico)	Oscar Zea	Necaxa	December 14, 2012
TBD	DF	(Mexico)	Cristian Zamudio	Pumas Morelos	December 20, 2012
TBD	MF	(Mexico)	Francisco Javier Herrera	Correcaminos	December 20, 2012
TBD	FW	(Mexico)	Luis Alberto Valdés	Mérida	December 14, 2012
TBD	FW	(Mexico)	Jonathan Hernández	Celaya	December 14, 2012
TBD	MF	(Mexico)	Eduardo Barron	Pumas Morelos	December 20, 2012
