= Clausura 2013 Copa MX =

Tournament details
- Country: Mexico
- Teams: 22

Final positions
- Champions: Cruz Azul (3rd title)
- Runners-up: Atlante

Tournament statistics
- Matches played: 92
- Goals scored: 207 (2.25 per match)
- Top goal scorer: Narciso Mina (8 goals)

The Copa 2013 MX Clausura was the 69th staging of the Copa MX, the 42nd staging in the professional era and is the second tournament played since the 1996–97 edition.

This tournament started on January 15, 2013, and concluded on April 10, 2013.

== Participants Clausura 2013 ==
This tournament will feature all the clubs from the Liga MX, excluding those that will participate in the 2012-13 CONCACAF Champions League (Santos, Tigres, Monterrey and Guadalajara), and the 3 that will participate in the Copa Libertadores 2013 (León, Tijuana and Toluca) and the best 13 teams from the Ascenso MX, excluding Leones Negros and Pumas Morelos.

== List of teams ==
Club	League	Stadium	Capacity
Altamira	Ascenso MX	Altamira	12,500
América	Liga MX	Azteca	114,000
Atlante	Liga MX	Andrés Quintana Roo	20,000
Atlas	Liga MX	Jalisco	56,713
Celaya	Ascenso MX	Miguel Alemán	25,000
Correcaminos	Ascenso MX	Marte R. Gómez	18,000
Cruz Azul	Liga MX	Azul	35,000
Cruz Azul Hidalgo	Ascenso MX	10 de Diciembre	17,000
Dorados	Ascenso MX	Carlos González	21,325
Estudiantes Tecos	Ascenso MX	Tres de Marzo	30,000
Irapuato	Ascenso MX	Sergio León Chávez	25,000
Chiapas	Liga MX	Víctor Manuel Reyna	25,222
La Piedad	Ascenso MX	Juan N. López	15,700
Lobos BUAP	Ascenso MX	Olímpico de C.U.	20,700
Mérida	Ascenso MX	Carlos Iturralde	24,000
Morelia	Liga MX	Morelos	41,056
Necaxa	Ascenso MX	Victoria	25,000
Neza	Ascenso MX	Neza 86	25,000
Pachuca	Liga MX	Hidalgo	25,000
Puebla	Liga MX	Cuauhtémoc	48,000
Querétaro	Liga MX	Corregidora	41,000
San Luis	Liga MX	Alfonso Lastras	35,000
UNAM	Liga MX	Olímpico Universitario	68,954
Veracruz	Ascenso MX	Luis de la Fuente	30,000

== Tiebreakers ==
If two or more clubs are equal on points on completion of the group matches, the following criteria are applied to determine the rankings:

1. superior goal difference;
2. higher number of goals scored;
3. scores of the group matches played among the clubs in question;
4. higher number of goals scored away in the group matches played among the clubs in question;
5. best position in the Relegation table;
6. fair play ranking;
7. drawing of lots.

== Group stage ==
Every group is composed by four clubs, two from Liga MX and two from Ascenso MX. Instead of a traditional robin-round schedule, the clubs will play in three two-legged "rounds", the last one being contested by clubs of the same league.

Each win gives a club 3 points, each draw gives 1 point. An extra point is awarded for every round won; a round is won by aggregated score, and if it is a tie, the extra point will be awarded to the team with higher number of goals scored away.

Key to colours in group tables
Group winners advance to the Championship Stage
Two best runners-up also advances to the Championship Stage

All times are UTC-05:00

=== Group 1 ===
Clubs from Liga MX: América
Clubs from Ascenso MX: Necaxa, Neza and Altamira
Broadcaster: TDN

Club	Pld	W	D	L	RG	GF	GA	GD	Pts
América	6	5	0	1	3	17	7	+10	18
Necaxa	6	4	0	2	2	6	7	-1	14
Neza	6	2	1	3	1	8	10	–2	8
Altamira	6	0	1	5	0	4	13	–9	1

	AME	NEC	NEZ	ALT
América	–	3-1	0-1	2–0
Necaxa	1-4	–	3–0	3–2
Neza	3-5	0-1	–	3-0
Altamira	1-3	0-1	1-1	–

Round 1

January 15, 2013
19:00

Necaxa	3 – 0	Neza
L. Hernández 9'; E. Orozco 61'; M. Pérez 78'	Report

Estadio Victoria, Aguascalientes
Attendance: 5,180
Referee: Obed Eliud Gómez Barreras
January 22, 2013
15:00

Neza	0 - 1	Necaxa
	Report	J. Isijara 81'

Estadio Neza 86, Ciudad Nezahualcóyotl
Referee: Quetzalli Alvarado Godínez

Necaxa won the round 4-0 on aggregated score

January 16, 2013
21:00

América	2 – 0	Altamira
O. Martínez 54'; S. Morandi 58' (o.g.)	Report

Estadio Azteca, Mexico City
Attendance: 17,005
Referee: Miguel Ángel Flores Rodríguez
January 22, 2013
21:00

Altamira	1 - 3	América
M. Piñón 30'	Report	A. Mina 11', 14'; M. Zuñiga 78'

Estadio Altamira, Altamira
Referee: Fernando Hernandez Gomez

América won the round 5-1 on aggregated score

Round 2

February 13, 2013
19:00

Altamira	1 - 1	Neza
A. Herrera 69'		L. Arroyo 78'

Estadio Altamira, Altamira
Referee: Mario Alcántara González
February 19, 2013
15:00

Neza	3 - 0	Altamira
E. Mendoza 2'; R. Reyes 33'; A. Lucio 72'	Report

Estadio Neza 86, Ciudad Nezahualcóyotl

Neza won the round 4-1 on aggregated score

February 13, 2013
21:00

Necaxa	1 - 4	América
M. García 55'	Report	M. Layún 30'; A. López 35'; R. Sambueza 65'; N. Mina 74'

Estadio Victoria, Aguascalientes
Attendance: 21,380
Referee: Roberto Ríos
February 19, 2013
21:00

América	3 - 1	Necaxa
V. Alvarado 64'; A. López 67'; G. Cordero 91'	Report	E. Orozco 36'

Estadio Azteca, Mexico City
Referee: Miguel Ángel Ayala

América won the round 7-2 on aggregated score

Round 3

February 26, 2013
19:00

Necaxa	3 - 2	Altamira
E. Orozco 7'; L. Gallardo 49'; D. Santoya 67'		M. Piñón 39'; R. González 47'

Estadio Victoria, Aguascalientes
March 5, 2013
19:00

Altamira	0 - 1	Necaxa

Estadio Altamira, Altamira

Necaxa won the round 4-2 on aggregated score

February 27, 2013
15:00

Neza	3 – 5	América

Estadio Neza 86, Ciudad Nezahualcóyotl
March 5, 2013
21:00

América	0 - 1	Neza

Estadio Azteca, Mexico City

America won the round 5-4 on aggregated score

=== Group 2 ===
Clubs from Liga MX: Morelia and Querétaro
Clubs from Ascenso MX: Veracruz and Estudiantes Tecos
Broadcaster: TVC Deportes

Club	Pld	W	D	L	RG	GF	GA	GD	Pts
Estudiantes Tecos	6	3	2	1	2	10	6	+4	13
Querétaro	6	2	4	0	2	6	4	+2	12
Veracruz	6	1	2	3	1	5	8	-3	6
Morelia	6	0	4	2	1	5	8	-3	5

	MOR	QRO	VER	EST
Morelia	–	0–0	1–1	1–3
Querétaro	1–1	–	1–1	1–1
Veracruz	2–1	0–1	–	0–2
Estudiantes Tecos	1–1	1–2	2–1	–

Round 1

January 16, 2013
19:00

Estudiantes	1 – 2	Querétaro
L. Nieves 32'	Report	P. Gabas 12'; J. Echavarría 62'

Estadio Tres de Marzo, Zapopan
Attendance: 3,099
Referee: Uriel Olvera Ríos
January 22, 2013
19:00

Querétaro	1 - 1	Estudiantes
A. Rippa 67'	Report	E. Lillingston 21' (pen.)

Estadio Corregidora, Querétaro
Referee: Miguel Ángel Ayala Ramírez

Quéretaro won the round 3-2 on aggregated score

January 16, 2013
21:00

Morelia	1 – 1	Veracruz
H. Mancilla 50'	Report	C. Ocaña 85'

Estadio Morelos, Morelia
Attendance: 8,561
Referee: Oscar Macías Romo
January 22, 2013
21:00

Veracruz	2 - 1	Morelia
C. Ocaña 11'	Report	R. Sato 43'; J. Lozano 68' (o.g.)

Estadio Luis de la Fuente, Veracruz
Referee: Eduardo Galván Basulto

Veracruz won the round 3-2 on aggregated score

Round 2

February 13, 2013
19:00

Querétaro	1 - 1	Veracruz
H. Gómez 70'	Report	O. Marrufo 50'

Estadio Corregidora, Querétaro
Attendance: 4,864
Referee: Jorge Isaac Rojas
February 20, 2013
21:00

Veracruz	v	Querétaro

Estadio Luis de la Fuente, Veracruz

February 14, 2013
21:00

Estudiantes	1 - 1	Morelia

Estadio Tres de Marzo, Zapopan
February 19, 2013
19:00

Morelia	1 - 3	Estudiantes
J. Vázquez 69'	Report	C. Martínez 24'; R. Godínez 29' (o.g.); R. Ruíz 59'

Estadio Morelos, Morelia
Referee: Miguel Ángel Ortega

Estudiantes won the round 4-2 on aggregated score

Round 3

February 26, 2013
19:00

Estudiantes	2 - 1	Veracruz

Estadio Tres de Marzo, Zapopan
March 5, 2013
19:00

Veracruz	0 - 2	Estudiantes

Estadio Luis de la Fuente, Veracruz

Estudiantes Tecos won the round 4-1 on aggregated score

February 26, 2013
21:00

Querétaro	1 - 1	Morelia

Estadio Corregidora, Querétaro
March 5, 2013
21:00

Morelia	0 - 0	Querétaro

Estadio Morelos, Morelia

2-2 on aggregated score

=== Group 3 ===
Clubs from Liga MX: Cruz Azul and Atlas
Clubs from Ascenso MX: Lobos BUAP and Irapuato
Broadcaster: ESPN

Club	Pld	W	D	L	RG	GF	GA	GD	Pts
Cruz Azul	6	4	1	1	2	8	5	+3	15
Atlas	6	3	2	1	3	10	5	+5	14
Irapuato	6	1	3	2	1	8	7	1	7
Lobos BUAP	6	0	2	4	0	1	10	–9	2

	CRA	ATL	BUAP	IRA
Cruz Azul	–	2–1	1–0	0–0
Atlas	3–1	–	0–0	2–2
Lobos BUAP	0–2	0–2	–	0–4
Irapuato	1–2	0–2	1–1	–

Round 1

January 15, 2013
21:00

Cruz Azul	1 – 0	Lobos BUAP
M. Pavone 9'	Report

Estadio Azul, Mexico City
Attendance: 4,589
Referee: César Arturo Ramos Palazuelos
January 23, 2013
21:00

Lobos BUAP	0 - 2	Cruz Azul
P. Ibarra 84' (o.g.)	Report	J. Aquino 45'

Estadio Olímpico de C.U., Puebla
Attendance: 19,050
Referee: Roberto Ríos Jácome

Cruz Azul won the round 3-0 on aggregated score

January 16, 2013
21:00

Irapuato	0 – 2	Atlas
	Report	L. Télles 50'; J. Barraza 87'

Estadio Sergio León Chávez, Irapuato
Attendance: 6,920
Referee: Angel Monroy Bello
January 23, 2013
19:00

Atlas	2 - 2	Irapuato
L. Sandoval 29', 32'; G. Martín 57' (o.g.)	Report	O . Ayoví 6'

Estadio Jalisco, Guadalajara
Attendance: 10,990
Referee: Víctor Bisguerra Mendiola

Atlas won the round 4-2 on aggregated score

Round 2

February 12, 2013
21:00

Lobos BUAP	0 - 2	Atlas
	Report	G. Torres 89'; E. Rivera 91'

Estadio Olímpico de C.U., Puebla
Attendance: 9,242
Referee: Marco Antonio Ortiz
February 19, 2013
21:00

Atlas	0 - 0	Lobos BUAP
	Report

Estadio Jalisco, Guadalajara
Attendance: 8,615
Referee: Oscar Macías Romo

Atlas won the round 2-0 on aggregated score

February 13, 2013
19:00

Cruz Azul	0 - 0	Irapuato

Estadio Azul, Mexico City
February 20, 2013
21:00

Irapuato	1 - 2	Cruz Azul

Estadio Sergio León Chávez, Irapuato

Cruz Azul won the round 2-1 on aggregated score

Round 3

February 27, 2013
19:00

Lobos BUAP	0 - 4	Irapuato

Estadio Olímpico de C.U., Puebla
March 6, 2013
19:00

Irapuato	1 - 1	Lobos BUAP

Estadio Sergio León Chávez, Irapuato

Irapuato won the round 5-1 on aggregated score

February 27, 2013
21:00

Cruz Azul	2 - 1	Atlas

Estadio Azul, Mexico City
March 6, 2013
21:00

Atlas	3 - 1	Cruz Azul

Estadio Jalisco, Guadalajara

Atlas won the round 4-3 on aggregated score

=== Group 4 ===
Clubs from Liga MX: UNAM and Puebla
Clubs from Ascenso MX: Mérida and Celaya
Broadcaster: SKY and TDN

Club	Pld	W	D	L	RG	GF	GA	GD	Pts
Puebla	6	3	2	1	2	12	6	+6	13
UNAM	6	2	3	1	3	12	5	+7	12
Mérida	6	2	2	2	1	8	13	–5	9
Celaya	6	0	3	3	0	9	17	–8	3

	UNAM	PUE	MER	CEL
UNAM	–	1–1	5–0	1–1
Puebla	0–3	–	3–1	4–0
Mérida	1–0	0–0	–	3–2
Celaya	2–2	1–4	3–3	–

Round 1

January 16, 2013
21:00

Mérida	1 – 0	UNAM
A. Reyes 10'	Report

Estadio Carlos Iturralde, Mérida
Referee: Marco Antonio Ortíz Nava
January 23, 2013
21:00

UNAM	5 - 0	Mérida
L. García 12'; C. Orrantia 21'; E. Velarde 35'; R. Ramírez 56'; E. Herrera 82'	Report

Estadio Olímpico Universitario, Mexico City
Attendance: 5,968
Referee: Miguel ángel Ortega rojas

UNAM won the round 5-1 on aggregated score

January 17, 2013
21:00

Puebla	4 – 0	Celaya
F. Borja 22'; S .Castillo 35'; L. Noriega 43'; M. Alustiza 74'	Report

Estadio Cuauhtémoc, Puebla
Attendance: 6,195
Referee: Víctor Bisguerra Mendiola
January 23, 2013
21:00

Celaya	1 - 4	Puebla
J. Ocampo 15'	Report	M. Alustiza 1', 85', 87'; A. Medina 6'

Estadio Miguel Alemán, Celaya
Attendance: 3,280
Referee: Oscar Bernardo Villagímez Gurria

Puebla won the round 8-1 on aggregated score

Round 2

February 12, 2013
21:00

UNAM	1 - 1	Celaya
A. Nieto 67'	Report	Jorge Valente Ocampo Ortega 84'

Estadio Olímpico Universitario, Mexico City
Referee: Antony Zanjuampa Rojo
February 20, 2013
21:00

Celaya	2 - 2	UNAM
Abraham Isaí Riestra Parra 40'; Julio César Pardini Sandoval 71'	Report	A. Nieto 12'; J. Lozano 34'

Estadio Miguel Alemán, Celaya
Referee: Mauricio Martínez Figueroa

3-3 on aggregated score

February 20, 2013
19:00

Mérida	0 - 0	Puebla

Estadio Carlos Iturralde, Mérida
February 13, 2013
21:00

Puebla	3 - 1	Mérida

Estadio Cuauhtémoc, Puebla

Puebla won the round 3-1 on aggregated score

Round 3

February 27, 2013
19:00

Mérida	3 - 2	Celaya

Estadio Carlos Iturralde, Mérida
March 6, 2013
19:00

Celaya	3 - 3	Mérida

Estadio Miguel Alemán, Celaya

Merida won the round 6-5 on aggregated score

February 27, 2013
21:00

UNAM	1 - 1	Puebla

Estadio Olímpico Universitario, Mexico City
March 6, 2013
21:00

Puebla	0 - 3	UNAM

Estadio Cuauhtémoc, Puebla

UNAM won the round 4-1 on aggregated score

=== Group 5 ===
Clubs from Liga MX: Chiapas and San Luis
Clubs from Ascenso MX: La Piedad and Cruz Azul Hidalgo
Broadcaster: SKY and TDN

Club	Pld	W	D	L	RG	GF	GA	GD	Pts
Chiapas	6	3	3	0	3	6	3	+3	15
San Luis	6	3	1	2	1	9	9	0	11
Cruz Azul Hidalgo	6	1	2	3	1	8	7	+1	6
La Piedad	6	1	2	3	1	4	8	–4	6

	JAG	SNL	LPD	CAH
Chiapas	–	3–2	3–2	2–1
San Luis	1–0	–	2–1	3–2
La Piedad	0–1	1–4	–	1–0
Cruz Azul Hidalgo	0–0	0–0	1–1	–

Round 2

February 12, 2013
19:00

Chiapas	2 – 1	Cruz Azul Hidalgo
D. Castellanos 74'; L. Loroña 75'; M. Trujillo 82' (pen.)	Report	R. Wbías 25'; M. Galván 88'

Estadio Víctor Manuel Reyna, Tuxtla Gutierrez
Attendance: 2,469
Referee: Miguel Ángel Chacón Viveros
February 20, 2013
15:00

Cruz Azul Hidalgo	4 - 0	Chiapas
	Report

Estadio 10 de Diciembre, Jasso, Hidalgo
Attendance: 2,375
Referee: Mauricio Martínez Figueroa

Cruz Azul Hidalgo won the round 5-2 on aggregated score

February 12, 2013
15:00

La Piedad	0 – 1	San Luis
O. Rojas 71'	Report	J. Cuevas 25'; A. Ortiz 28'; Y. Corona 66'; M. Pérez 73'

Estadio Juan N. López, La Piedad
Attendance: 2,958
Referee: León Vicente Barajas Anzures
February 21, 2013
19:00

San Luis	0 - 0	La Piedad
M. Matos 72'; J. Cuevas 83' (pen.)	Report	J. Aparicio 32'

Estadio Alfonso Lastras, San Luis Potosí
Attendance: 3,297
Referee: César Arturo Ramos Palazuelos

San Luis won the round 6-2 on aggregated score

Round 1

January 16, 2013
15:00

La Piedad	1 - 4	Chiapas

Estadio Juan N. López, La Piedad
January 23, 2013
19:00

Chiapas	2 - 1	La Piedad

Estadio Víctor Manuel Reyna, Tuxtla Gutierrez

January 15, 2013
19:00

San Luis	3 - 2	Cruz Azul Hidalgo

Estadio Alfonso Lastras, San Luis Potosí
January 23, 2013
15:00

Cruz Azul Hidalgo	0 - 0	San Luis

Estadio 10 de Diciembre, Jasso, Hidalgo

Round 3

March 6, 2013
21:00

San Luis	1 - 0	Chiapas

Estadio Alfonso Lastras, San Luis Potosí
February 26, 2013
21:00

Chiapas	1 - 1	San Luis

Estadio Víctor Manuel Reyna, Tuxtla Gutierrez

February 27, 2013
16:00

La Piedad	1 - 0	Cruz Azul Hidalgo

Estadio Juan N. López, La Piedad
March 7, 2013
15:00

Cruz Azul Hidalgo	1 - 1	La Piedad

Estadio 10 de Diciembre, Jasso, Hidalgo

=== Group 6 ===
Clubs from Liga MX: Pachuca and Atlante
Clubs from Ascenso MX: Dorados and Correcaminos
Broadcaster: TVC Deportes

Club	Pld	W	D	L	RG	GF	GA	GD	Pts
Pachuca	6	4	0	2	3	15	10	+5	15
Atlante	6	4	1	1	2	11	6	+5	15
Dorados	6	1	2	3	0	10	13	–3	5
Correcaminos	6	1	1	4	1	6	13	–7	5

	PAC	ATN	SIN	UAT
Pachuca	–	4–2	4–0	3–1
Atlante	1–0	–	2–2	4–0
Dorados	5–2	0–1	–	2–2
Correcaminos	1–2	0–1	2–1	–

Round 1

January 15, 2013
21:00

Atlante	2 – 2	Dorados
J. Amione 16'; F. Fonseca 64'	Report	G. Ramírez 42'; E. Castro 69'

Estadio Andrés Quintana Roo, Cancún
Attendance: 3,200
Referee: Jorge Isaac Rojas Castillo
January 23, 2013
20:00 MST/21:00 CST

Dorados	0 - 1	Atlante
	Report	C. González 86'

Estadio Carlos González, Culiacán
Referee: Angel Monroy Bello

Atlante won the round 3-2 on aggregated score

January 16, 2013
21:00

Correcaminos	1 – 2	Pachuca
R. Molina 90+3'	Report	F. Navarro 29'; E. Esqueda 90'

Estadio Marte R. Gómez, Ciudad Victoria
Attendance: 7,358
Referee: Cirilo Arturo Cruz Hurtado
January 23, 2013
19:00

Pachuca	3 - 1	Correcaminos
D. Ludueña 21'; M. Herrera 57'; R. Meráz] 72'	Report	E. Gallegos 28'

Estadio Hidalgo, Pachuca
Referee: Oscar Macías Romo

Pachuca won the round 5-2 on aggregated score

Round 2

February 13, 2013
19:00

Pachuca	4 - 0	Dorados
E. García 50'; F. Cavenaghi 87'; V. Mañón 90'; R. Meráz 92'

Estadio Hidalgo, Pachuca
Referee: Miguel Ángel Ayala Ramírez
February 19, 2013
20:00 MST/21:00 CST

Dorados	5 - 2	Pachuca
H. Velázquez 12'; H. Aldair 18' (o.g.); J. Guemez 55'; G. Ramírez 68'; C. Blanco 78'	Report	R. Pizarro 23'; S. Almeida 41'

Estadio Carlos González, Culiacán
Referee: Quetzalli Alvarado

Pachuca won the round 6-5 on aggregated score

February 13, 2013
21:00

Correcaminos	0 - 1	Atlante
	Report	A. García 46'

Estadio Marte R. Gómez, Ciudad Victoria
Referee: Arturo Cruz Hurtado
February 19, 2013
19:00

Atlante	4 - 0	Correcaminos
A. García 36', 55'; J. Amione 64', 65'	Report

Estadio Andrés Quintana Roo, Cancún
Referee: Jorge Isaac Rojas

Atlante won the round 5-0 on aggregated score

Round 3

February 26, 2013
19:00

Pachuca	4 - 2	Atlante

Estadio Hidalgo, Pachuca
March 6, 2013
19:00

Atlante	1 - 0	Pachuca

Estadio Andrés Quintana Roo, Cancún

February 26, 2013
21:00

Correcaminos	2 - 1	Dorados

Estadio Marte R. Gómez, Ciudad Victoria
March 5, 2013
20:00 MST/21:00 CST

Dorados	2 - 2	Correcaminos

Estadio Carlos González, Culiacán

=== Ranking of runners-up clubs ===
The best two runners-up advances to the Championship Stage. If two or more teams are equal on points on completion of the group matches, the following criteria are applied to determine the rankings:

1. superior goal difference;
2. higher number of goals scored;
3. higher number of goals scored away;
4. best position in the Relegation table;
5. fair play ranking;
6. drawing of lots.

Group	Club	Pld	W	D	L	RG	GF	GA	GD	Pts
6	Atlante	6	4	1	1	2	11	6	+5	15
3	Atlas	6	3	2	1	3	10	5	+5	14
1	Necaxa	6	4	0	2	2	10	9	+1	14
2	Queretaro	6	2	4	0	2	6	4	+2	12
4	Pumas	6	2	3	1	3	12	5	+7	12
5	San Luis	6	3	1	2	1	9	9	+0	11

== Championship Stage ==
The eight clubs that advance to this stage will be ranked and seeded 1 to 8. In case of ties, the same tiebreakers used to rank the runners-up will be used.

In this stage, all the rounds will be one-off game. If the game ends in a tie, there will proceed to penalty shootouts directly. The venue will be determined as follows:

- If both clubs are from the same league, the highest seeded club will host the match.
- If both clubs are from different leagues, the club from Ascenso MX will host the match.

=== Liguilla Bracket ===
Quarterfinals
Atlante	0(3)
Atlas	0(2)
Pachuca	1(3)
Puebla	1(5)
Tecos	1(4)
América	1(5)
Cruz Azul	1
Chiapas	0

Semifinals
Atlante	1(5)
Puebla	1(4)
América	1(4)
Cruz Azul	1(5)

Final
Atlante	0(2)
Cruz Azul	0(4)

== Goalscorers ==
8 goals

- (Ecuador) Narciso Mina (América)

7 goals

- (Argentina) Matías Alustiza (Puebla)

4 goals

- (Mexico) Alberto García (Atlante)
- (Mexico) Jerónimo Amione (Atlante)
- (Mexico) Ezequiel Orozco (Necaxa)

3 goals

- (Argentina) Juan Cuevas (San Luis)
- (Mexico) Pablo Hütt (Cruz Azul Hidalgo)
- (Argentina) Daniel Ludueña (Pachuca)
- (Argentina) Fernando Cavenaghi (Pachuca)
- (Mexico) Antonio López Ojeda (América)
- (Mexico) Luis Arroyo (Neza)
- (Spain) Luis García Sanz (Pumas)
- (Mexico) Jahir Barraza (Atlas)
- (Colombia) Teófilo Gutiérrez (Cruz Azul)

2 goals

- (Mexico) Cristian Felipe Ocaña Téllez (Veracruz)
- (Mexico) Luis Alonso Sandoval (Atlas)
- (Mexico) Yasser Corona (San Luis)
- (Mexico) Jorge Ocampo (Celaya)
- (Mexico) Raúl Meraz (Pachuca)
- (Mexico) Alfonso Nieto (Pumas)
- (Paraguay) Gustavo A. Ramírez Rojas (Dorados)
- (Mexico) Marvin Leonardo Piñón (Altamira)
- (Mexico) Eder Pacheco (Correcaminos)
- (Mexico) Roberto Ruiz Esparza Jr. (Merida)
- (Argentina) Ariel González (Irapuato)
- (Argentina) Damián Zamogilny (Irapuato)
- (Uruguay) Diego Martiñones (Tecos)
- (Mexico) Christian Mejía (Tecos)
- (Mexico) Ricardo Antonio Jiménez (Correcaminos)
- (Mexico) Francisco Fonseca (Atlante)
- (Mexico) Iván Salvador Estrella Guerrero (Celaya)
- (Mexico) Eduardo Lillingston (Tecos)
- (Mexico) Isaac Romo (Puebla)

1 goal

- (Mexico) Luis Omar Hernández (Necaxa)
- (Mexico) Rubén Wbías (Cruz Azul Hidalgo)
- (Mexico) Luis Loroña (Chiapas)
- (Mexico) Diego Castellanos (Chiapas)
- (Uruguay) Maximiliano Pérez (Necaxa)
- (Mexico) Mariano Trujillo (Chiapas)
- (Mexico) Martín Galván (Cruz Azul Hidalgo)
- (Argentina) Mariano Pavone (Cruz Azul)
- (Mexico) Elio Castro Guadarrama (Dorados)
- (Mexico) Álvaro Ortiz (San Luis)
- (Costa Rica) Óscar Emilio Rojas (La Piedad)
- (Mexico) Marco Iván Pérez (San Luis)
- (Argentina) (Costa Rica) (Mexico) Pablo Antonio Gabas (Queretaro)
- (Mexico) Luis Nieves (Tecos)
- (Mexico) Jorge Arturo Echavarría Alemán (Queretaro)
- (Mexico) Addiel Reyes (Merida)
- (Mexico) Fernando Navarro Morán (Pachuca)
- (Chile) Héctor Mancilla (Morelia)
- (Mexico) Luis Fernando Télles González (Atlas)
- (Paraguay) Osvaldo Martínez (America)
- (Mexico) Enrique Esqueda (Pachuca)
- (Ecuador) Félix Borja (Puebla)
- (Ecuador) Segundo Castillo (Puebla)
- (Mexico) Luis Miguel Noriega (Puebla)
- (Mexico) Jesús Isijara (Necaxa)
- (Japan) Reiji Sato (Morelia)
- (Mexico) Alfonso Rippa (Querétaro)
- (Mexico) Martín Eduardo Zúñiga (América)
- (Mexico) Eduardo Gallegos (Correcaminos)
- (Mexico) Miguel Ángel Herrera (Pachuca)
- (Mexico) Jorge Aparicio (La Piedad)
- (Mexico) Alberto Medina (Puebla)
- (Mexico) Carlos Emilio Orrantía (Pumas)
- (Mexico) Efraín Velarde (Pumas)
- (Mexico) Javier Aquino (Cruz Azul)
- (Mexico) Eduardo Herrera (Pumas)
- (Mexico) Claudio Ernesto González Muñoz (Atlante)
- (Ecuador) Orlindo Ayoví (Irapuato)
- (Argentina) Mauro Matos (San Luis)
- (Paraguay) Robin Ramírez (Pumas)
- (Mexico) Jorge Zárate (Chiapas)
- (Mexico) Héctor Acevedo (Cruz Azul Hidalgo)
- (Mexico) Gregorio Torres (Atlas)
- (Mexico) Edson Rivera (Atlas)
- (Mexico) Agustín Enrique Herrera (Altamira)
- (Mexico) Emilio García (Pachuca)
- (Mexico) Víctor Mañon (Pachuca)
- (Mexico) Omar Marrufo (Veracruz)
- (Mexico) Héctor Gómez (Queretaro)
- (Mexico) Miguel Layún (América)
- (Argentina) Rubens Sambueza (América)
- (Mexico) Michel García (Necaxa)
- (Mexico) Juan Pablo Alfaro (Tecos)
- (Mexico) Christian Valdez (Morelia)
- (Mexico) Eduardo Mendoza Herrera (Neza)
- (Mexico) José Rodolfo Reyes (Neza)
- (Mexico) Alberto Lucio (Neza)
- (Mexico) Hibert Ruiz (Morelia)
- (Mexico) Héctor Velázquez (Dorados)
- (Mexico) Rodolfo Pizarro (Pachuca)
- (Mexico) Simón Almeida (Pachuca)
- (Mexico) Javier Güemez (Dorados)
- (Mexico) Gil Cordero (América)
- (Mexico) Tomás Quiñones (Cruz Azul Hidalgo)
- (Mexico) Jaime Lozano (Pumas)
- (Mexico) Abraham Riestra (Celaya)
- (Mexico) Julio Pardini (Celaya)
- (Mexico) Diego Alberto Cervantes (Querétaro)
- (Mexico) Allam Bello (Cruz Azul)
- (Mexico) Rolando González (Estudiantes de Altamira)
- (Mexico) Lugiani Gallardo (Necaxa)
- (Mexico) Daniel Quintero Huitrón (Tecos)
- (Mexico) Cuauhtémoc Blanco (Dorados)
- (Chile) Rodrigo Ruiz (Tecos)
- (United States) Ventura Alvarado (America)
- (Colombia) Danny Santoya (Necaxa)
- (Mexico) Mitchel Oviedo (Querétaro)
- (Mexico) Francisco Torres (Morelia)
- (Mexico) Edson Silva (San Luis)
- (Mexico) Mario Padilla (Dorados)
- (Mexico) Fernando Sinecio González Torres (La Piedad)
- (Mexico) Jorge Alberto Urias Gaxiola (América)
- (Argentina) Emanuel Loeschbor (Neza)
- (Mexico) Marco Gómez (Mérida)
- (Mexico) Guillermo Clemens (Celaya)
- (Mexico) Dante Garay (Mérida)
- (Mexico) Marco Reyna (Celaya)
- (Mexico) Gustavo Guillen (Irapuato)
- (Argentina) Martín Bravo (Pumas)
- (Mexico) Ángel Sepúlveda (Neza)
- (Mexico) Adolfo Domínguez Gerardo (Dorados)
- (Mexico) Natividad Carrasco (Dorados)
- (Mexico) Alejandro Molina (Correcaminos)
- (Mexico) Íñigo Rey (Irapuato)
- (Brazil) Dudu Paraiba (Lobos BUAP)
- (Mexico) Bardo Issac Fierros Ruiz (Mérida)
- (Argentina) Rodrigo Noya (Mérida)
- (Argentina) Tomás Charles (Mérida)
- (Mexico) José Leonardo Cuevas (Celaya)
- (Mexico) Carlos Gutiérrez Armas (Atlas)
- (Mexico) Vicente Matías Vuoso (Atlas)
- (Colombia) Jhon Córdoba (Chiapas)
- (Mexico) Alan Mendoza (Pumas)
- (Mexico) Jorge Mora (Cruz Azul Hidalgo)
- (Mexico) Emmanuel Sánchez (La Piedad)
- (Mexico) Darío Carreño (Pachuca)
- (Chile) Esteban Paredes (Atlante)
- (Argentina) Christian Giménez (Cruz Azul)

Own goals

- (Uruguay) Sanitago Morandi (Altamira) (For America)
- (Mexico) Jonathan Lozano (Morelia) (For Veracruz)
- (Mexico) Guillermo Christhofer Martín Torres (Atlas) (For Irapuato)
- (Mexico) Pierre Ibarra (Lobos BUAP) (For Cruz Azul)
- (Mexico) Rodrigo Godinez (Morelia) (For Tecos)
- (Mexico) Hervey Meza (Pachuca) (For Dorados)
- (Mexico) Josue Perea (Irapuato) (For Cruz Azul)
- (Mexico) Daniel Quintero Huitrón (Tecos) (For Veracruz)
- (Mexico) Carlos Trejo (San Luis) (For Jaguares)

== Broadcast ==
Four television networks have the broadcasting rights.

- TVC Deportes: Group 2 and Group 6
- TDN: Group 1, Group 4 (UNAM and Puebla) and Group 5 (San Luis and Cruz Azul Hidalgo)
- ESPN Deportes: Group 3
- SKY México: Group 4 (Mérida and Celaya) and Group 5 (Chiapas and La Piedad)

The broadcasting rights for the Championship Stage are shared between all the networks.
