= Liga de Ascenso Apertura 2009 Liguilla Final =

- Event: Liga de Ascenso Apertura 2009 Liguilla
Necaxa	Irapuato
(Mexico)	(Mexico)
4	3
- On aggregate

First leg
Necaxa	Irapuato
1	0
- Date: 9 December 2009
- Venue: Estadio Victoria, Aguascalientes, Aguascalientes
- Referee: Carlos Manuel Martínez Soto (Mexico)

Second leg
Irapuato	Necaxa
3	3
- (a.e.t.)
- Date: 12 December 2009
- Venue: Estadio Sergio León Chavez, Irapuato, Guanajuato
- Referee: Fernando Guerrero Ramírez (Mexico)

The Apertura 2009 Liguilla Final was a two-legged football match-up to determine the Apertura 2009 champion.

Necaxa won 1-0 at home in the first leg, but after 90 minutes in the second leg Irapuato were 2-1 up and so the tie was taken into extra time. The second leg would eventually end 3-3, meaning Necaxa won tournament 4-3 on aggregate.

== Final rules ==
Like other match-ups in the knockout round, the teams will play two games, one at each team's home stadium. As the highest seeded team determined at the beginning of the Liguilla, Irapuato was to have home-field advantage for the second leg. If the teams remained tied after 90 minutes of play during the 2nd leg, extra time will be used, followed by a penalty shootout if necessary.

== Final summary ==
=== First leg ===
2009-12-09
17:00

Necaxa	1 – 0	Irapuato
Castillo 71'

Estadio Victoria
Aguascalientes, Aguascalientes
Referee: Carlos Manuel Martínez Soto (Mexico)

Necaxa	Irapuato

NECAXA:
GK	31	(Mexico) Iván Vázquez
DF	34	(Mexico) Luis Alberto Padilla
DF	33	(Argentina) Pablo Quatrocchi (c)
DF	26	(Mexico) Pierre Ibarra		(substituted off) 64'
DF	48	(Mexico) Arturo Javier Ledesma
MF	30	(Brazil) Everaldo Barbosa
MF	38	(Mexico) Marco Antonio Reyna
MF	40	(Mexico) Juan de Dios Hernández	(yellow card) 19'	(substituted off) 81'
MF	50	(Mexico) Paulo César Chávez	(yellow card) 56'
FW	56	(Uruguay) Nelson Sebastián Maz	(yellow card) 50'	(substituted off) 68'
FW	59	(Mexico) Mauricio Romero Alvizu	(yellow card) 90+4'
Substitutes:
GK	45	(Mexico) Pedro Hernández
DF	57	(Mexico) Obed Isai Rincón
MF	51	(Mexico) Carlos Alberto Hurtado		(substituted in) 64'
MF	58	(Mexico) Oscar Zea
FW	32	(Mexico) Luis Valdés		(substituted in) 81'
FW	44	(Mexico) Jesús Mendoza
FW	49	(Mexico) Alejandro Castillo		(substituted in) 68'
Manager:
(Mexico) Omar Arellano Nuño

IRAPUATO:
GK	12	(Mexico) Alfonso Blanco
DF	2	(Mexico) César Márquez	(yellow card) 43'
DF	3	(Mexico) Miguel Alejandro Gutiérrez (c)
DF	9	(Mexico) Leonardo Casanova	(yellow card) 88'
DF	13	(Mexico) Gandhi Vega	(yellow card) 18' (yellow-red card) 53'
MF	7	(Mexico) José de Jesús Gutiérrez
MF	8	(Mexico) Jorge Manrique Islas
MF	27	(Mexico) Gerardo Martín Gómez
FW	22	(Argentina) Roberto Nicolás Saucedo		(substituted off) 57'
FW	10	(Argentina) Diego Alberto Olsina		(substituted off) 66'
FW	11	(Mexico) Ariel González		(substituted off) 73'
Substitutes:
GK	1	(Mexico) Manuel Gerardo Corona
DF	6	(Mexico) Francisco Razo
MF	58	(Mexico) Efraín Cruz		(substituted in) 66'
MF	39	(Mexico) Noél Alberto Castillo	(yellow card) 75'	(substituted in) 57'
FW	37	(Mexico) José Israel Valadez
FW	45	(Mexico) José Cruz Gutiérrez		(substituted in) 3'
FW	18	(Uruguay) Gonzalo Pizzichillo
Manager:
(Argentina) Osvaldo Batocletti

Assistant referees:
(Mexico) Miguel Ángel Hernández Paredes
(Mexico) Luis Manuel Rivera López
Fourth official:
(Mexico) Mario Alonso Villa García

=== Second leg ===
2009-12-12
19:00

Irapuato	3 – 3 (a.e.t.)	Necaxa
González 15' (pen.), 19'; Manrique 98'		Romero 33'; Castillo 91' 107'

Estadio Sergio León Chavez
Irapuato, Guanajuato
Referee: Fernando Guerrero Ramírez (Mexico

Irapuato	Necaxa

IRAPUATO:
GK	12	(Mexico) Alfonso Blanco
DF	2	(Mexico) César Márquez	(yellow card) 80'
DF	3	(Mexico) Miguel Alejandro Gutiérrez (c)	(yellow card) 25'
DF	9	(Mexico) Leonardo Casanova	(yellow card) 20'
MF	7	(Mexico) José de Jesús Gutiérrez	(yellow card) 105'
MF	8	(Mexico) Jorge Manrique Islas
MF	27	(Mexico) Gerardo Martín Gómez		(substituted off) 46'
FW	22	(Argentina) Roberto Nicolás Saucedo		(substituted off) 109'
FW	10	(Argentina) Diego Alberto Olsina
FW	11	(Mexico) Ariel González
FW	18	(Uruguay) Gonzalo Pizzichillo		(substituted off) 97'
Substitutes:
GK	1	(Mexico) Manuel Gerardo Corona
DF	6	(Mexico) Francisco Razo
MF	58	(Mexico) Efraín Cruz		(substituted in) 46'
MF	39	(Mexico) Noél Alberto Castillo
FW	37	(Mexico) José Israel Valadez		(substituted in) 97'
FW	45	(Mexico) José Cruz Gutiérrez		(substituted in) 109'
Manager:
(Argentina) Osvaldo Batocletti

NECAXA:
GK	31	(Mexico) Iván Vázquez	(yellow card) 19'
DF	34	(Mexico) Luis Alberto Padilla
DF	33	(Argentina) Pablo Quatrocchi (c)	(yellow card) 104'
DF	26	(Mexico) Pierre Ibarra
DF	48	(Mexico) Arturo Javier Ledesma
MF	30	(Brazil) Everaldo Barbosa	(yellow card) 96'
MF	38	(Mexico) Marco Antonio Reyna	(yellow card) 44'	(substituted off) 54'
MF	40	(Mexico) Juan de Dios Hernández		(substituted off) 72'
MF	50	(Mexico) Paulo César Chávez	(yellow card) 13'
FW	56	(Uruguay) Nelson Sebastián Maz		(substituted off) 62'
FW	59	(Mexico) Mauricio Romero Alvizu
Substitutes:
GK	45	(Mexico) Pedro Hernández
DF	57	(Mexico) Obed Isai Rincón
MF	51	(Mexico) Carlos Alberto Hurtado	(yellow card) 56'	(substituted in) 54'
MF	58	(Mexico) Oscar Zea
FW	32	(Mexico) Luis Valdés
FW	54	(Mexico) Alberto Jorge Orozco		(substituted in) 72'
FW	49	(Mexico) Alejandro Castillo		(substituted in) 62'
Manager:
(Mexico) Omar Arellano Nuño

(Mexico) Víctor Javier Gutiérrez Martínez
(Mexico) Juan Carlos Salinas Salinas
Fourth official:
(Mexico) Israel Perea Vazquez
