= Primera División de México Clausura 2006 =

Primera División de México
- Season: 2005−06
- Champions: Pachuca (4th title)
- Relegated: Sinaloa
- Champions' Cup: Pachuca
- Interliga: Veracruz; Monterrey; Pachuca; Morelia; Guadalajara; UANL; Necaxa; Cruz Azul
- Copa Sudamericana: Pachuca
- Top goalscorer: Sebastián Abreu; Salvador Cabañas (11 goals)

Primera División de México (Mexican First Division) Clausura 2006 is a Mexican football tournament - one of two short tournaments that take up the entire year to determine the champion(s) of Mexican football. It began on Friday, January 20, 2006, and ran until April 30, when the regular season ended. Tecos and San Luis inaugurated the season with a match that resulted in a 2-1 victory for Tecos. On May 21, Pachuca defeated San Luis 1-0 and became champions for the fourth time. Although the team fielded one of two top scorers for this season, Sebastian Abreu, Dorados de Sinaloa was relegated to Primera 'A' in a dramatic last game of regular season against San Luis.

== Clubs ==
Location of the Primera División Clausura 2006 teams

Team	City	Stadium
América	Mexico City	Azteca
Atlante	Mexico City	Azteca
Atlas	Guadalajara, Jalisco	Jalisco
Chiapas	Tuxtla Gutiérrez, Chiapas	Víctor Manuel Reyna
Cruz Azul	Mexico City	Azul
Guadalajara	Guadalajara, Jalisco	Jalisco
Morelia	Morelia, Michoacán	Morelos
Monterrey	Monterrey, Nuevo León	Tecnológico
Necaxa	Aguascalientes, Aguascalientes	Victoria
Pachuca	Pachuca, Hidalgo	Hidalgo
San Luis	San Luis Potosí, S.L.P.	Alfonso Lastras
Santos Laguna	Torreón, Coahuila	Corona
Sinaloa	Culiacán, Sinaloa	Banorte
Toluca	Toluca, State of Mexico	Nemesio Díez
UAG	Zapopan, Jalisco	Tres de Marzo
UANL	San Nicolás de los Garza, Nuevo León	Universitario
UNAM	Mexico City	Olímpico Universitario
Veracruz	Veracruz, Veracruz	Luis "Pirata" Fuente

== Regular phase ==
Group 1
Pos	Team	Pld	W	D	L	GF	GA	GD	Pts	Qualification
1	Atlante	17	8	3	6	19	15	+4	27	Automatically qualified for the Liguilla (Playoffs)
2	San Luis	17	7	4	6	23	19	+4	25	Automatically qualified for the Liguilla (Playoffs)
3	Morelia	17	5	7	5	19	20	−1	22	Qualified for Liguilla (Playoffs) on a points basis
4	UAG	17	6	4	7	18	29	−11	22	
5	América	17	6	3	8	20	23	−3	21	
6	Necaxa	13	5	3	5	19	28	−9	18	

Source: MedioTiempo

Group 2
Pos	Team	Pld	W	D	L	GF	GA	GD	Pts	Qualification
1	Pachuca	17	9	4	4	33	19	+14	31	Automatically qualified for the Liguilla (Playoffs)
2	Toluca	17	7	3	7	22	19	+3	24	Automatically qualified for the Liguilla (Playoffs)
3	Sinaloa	17	4	10	3	24	24	0	22	
4	UNAM	17	5	7	5	15	16	−1	22	
5	Veracruz	17	5	5	7	16	19	−3	20	
6	Santos Laguna	17	3	9	5	20	25	−5	18	

Source: MedioTiempo

Group 3
Pos	Team	Pld	W	D	L	GF	GA	GD	Pts	Qualification
1	Chiapas	17	9	3	5	28	18	+10	30	Automatically qualified for the Liguilla (Playoffs)
2	Cruz Azul	17	9	3	5	29	20	+9	30	Automatically qualified for the Liguilla (Playoffs)
3	Guadalajara	17	6	5	6	19	26	−7	23	Qualified for Liguilla (Playoffs) on a points basis
4	UANL	17	4	9	4	15	15	0	21	
5	Atlas	17	5	5	7	23	23	0	20	
6	Monterrey	17	5	3	9	17	21	−4	18	

Source: MedioTiempo

== League table ==
Pos	Team	Pld	W	D	L	GF	GA	GD	Pts	Qualification
1	Pachuca	17	9	4	4	33	19	+14	31	Automatically qualified for the Liguilla (Playoffs)
2	Chiapas	17	9	3	5	28	18	+10	30	Automatically qualified for the Liguilla (Playoffs)
3	Cruz Azul	17	9	3	5	29	20	+9	30	Automatically qualified for the Liguilla (Playoffs)
4	Atlante	17	8	3	6	19	15	+4	27	Automatically qualified for the Liguilla (Playoffs)
5	San Luis	17	7	4	6	23	19	+4	25	Automatically qualified for the Liguilla (Playoffs)
6	Toluca	17	7	3	7	22	19	+3	24	Automatically qualified for the Liguilla (Playoffs)
7	Guadalajara	17	6	5	6	19	26	−7	23	Qualified for Liguilla (Playoffs) on a points basis
8	Sinaloa	17	4	10	3	24	24	0	22	
9	Morelia	17	5	7	5	19	20	−1	22	Qualified for Liguilla (Playoffs) on a points basis
10	UNAM	17	5	7	5	15	16	−1	22	
11	UAG	17	6	4	7	18	29	−11	22	
12	UANL	17	4	9	4	15	15	0	21	
13	América	17	6	3	8	20	23	−3	21	
14	Atlas	17	5	5	7	23	23	0	20	
15	Veracruz	17	5	5	7	16	19	−3	20	
16	Monterrey	17	5	3	9	17	21	−4	18	
17	Santos Laguna	17	3	9	5	20	25	−5	18	
18	Necaxa	17	5	3	9	19	28	−9	18	

Source: MedioTiempo

== Top goalscorers ==
Players sorted first by goals scored, then by last name. Only regular season goals listed.

Rank	Player	Club	Goals
1	(Uruguay) Sebastián Abreu	Sinaloa	11
1	(Paraguay) Salvador Cabañas	Chiapas	11
3	(Argentina) Ariel González	San Luis	10
3	(Argentina) Emmanuel Villa	Atlas	10
5	(Argentina) César Delgado	Cruz Azul	9
5	(Chile) Patricio Galaz	Atlante	9
7	(Uruguay) Gustavo Biscayzacú	Veracruz	8
8	(Brazil) Kléber Boas	América	7
8	(Paraguay) Nelson Cuevas	Pachuca	7
8	(Mexico) Francisco Fonseca	Cruz Azul	7
8	(Mexico) Luis Ángel Landín	Pachuca	7
8	(Argentina) Daniel Ludueña	UAG	7
8	(Mexico) Carlos Ochoa	Chiapas	7

Source: MedioTiempo

== Results ==
Home \ Away	AME	ATE	ATS	CHI	CAZ	GDL	MTY	MOR	NEC	PAC	SNL	SAN	SIN	TOL	UAG	UNL	UNM	VER
América	—	–	2–1	1–3	–	–	1–1	3–0	–	2–3	–	–	–	1–0	2–1	–	1–3	–
Atlante	1–0	—	0–1	–	1–2	2–0	–	–	–	1–2	1–1	–	0–0	0–0	–	–	1–0	–
Atlas	–	–	—	–	–	–	1–0	1–1	2–3	–	–	3–3	–	0–1		0–2	0–0	2–0
Chiapas	–	1–0	2–2	—	1–0	3–1	–	–	–	3–0	1–1	–	2–4	2–0	–	–	–	–
Cruz Azul	1–3	–	1–1	–	—	–	–	–	3–1	3–2	–	4–1	–	2–1		1–1	3–1	3–0
Guadalajara	1–0	–	0–3	–	1–0	—	–	–	–	3–2	1–3	1–1	–	0–2	–	1–0	2–2	–
Monterrey	–	3–0	–	0–3	0–1	1–2	—	1–0	–	–	0–1	–	2–1	–	2–3	–	–	–
Morelia	–	0–1	–	1–1	0–1	2–0	–	—	–	1–1	1–0	–	3–3	–	3–1	–	–	–
Necaxa	1–0	1–2	–	1–0	–	1–2	1–4	0–0	—	–	–	–	5–1	–	0–1	–	–	0–1
Pachuca	–	–	3–0	–	–	–	3–0	–	4–1	—	–	0–1	–	1–0		0–0	1–1	0–0
San Luis	2–0	–	2–1	–	2–1	–	–	–	3–0	2–3	—	1–1	–	1–3	–	0–0	3–0	–
Santos Laguna	2–2	3–4	–	2–1	–	–	1–1	0–0	1–1	–	–	—	1–1	–	1–1	–	–	0–2
Sinaloa	2–0	–	3–1	–	2–2	1–1	–	–	–	1–3	1–0	–	—	1–1	–	1–1	0–0	–
Toluca	–	–	–	–	–	–	0–1	2–3	3–1	–	–	1–2	–	—	3–1	1–1	2–1	2–1
UAG	–	0–2	0–4	0–1	2–1	2–2	–	–	–	0–5	2–1	–	1–1	–	—	–	–	–
UANL	1–1	0–2	–	1–0	–	–	2–1	2–3	1–2	–	–	1–0	–	–	0–0	—	–	1–1
UNAM	–	–	–	2–1	–	–	0–0	1–0	0–0	–	–	1–1	–	–	0–1	1–1	—	2–0
Veracruz	0–1	1–0	–	2–3	–	1–1	1–0	1–1	–	–	3–0	–	1–1	–	1–2	–	–	—

Updated to match(es) played on 30 April 2006. Source: RSSSF
Legend: Blue = home team win; Yellow = draw; Red = away team win.

== Final phase (Liguilla) ==
=== Bracket ===
Quarterfinals
1	Pachuca	1	3	4
9	Morelia	2	1	3
2	Chiapas	3	2	5
7	Guadalajara	2	4	6
4	Atlante	0	0	0
5	San Luis	1	0	1
3	Cruz Azul	1	1	2
6	Toluca	2	1	3

Semifinals
1	Pachuca (s)	2	2	4
7	Guadalajara	1	3	4
5	San Luis	2	2	4
6	Toluca	1	1	2

Finals
1	Pachuca	0	1	1
5	San Luis	0	0	0

=== Quarterfinals ===
May 4, 2006
19:00

Morelia	2–1	Pachuca
Márquez Lugo 21'; Rey 90'	Report	Núñez 3'

Estadio Morelos, Morelia
Referee: Paul Delgadillo (Jalisco)
May 7, 2006
17:00

Pachuca	3–1	Morelia
Núñez 2'; Cuevas 43'; Landín 57'	Report	Rey 70'

Estadio Hidalgo, Pachuca
Referee: Mauricio Morales (Mexico City)

Pachuca won 4–3 on aggregate.

May 4, 2006
20:45

Guadalajara	2–3	Chiapas
Ávila 33'; Medina 85'	Report	Cabañas 41', 51'; Sandoval 90+2'

Estadio Jalisco, Guadalajara
Referee: Roberto García Orozco (Mexico City)
May 7, 2006
15:00

Chiapas	2–4	Guadalajara
Jiménez 1'; Cabañas 52' (pen.)	Report	Borboa 23'; Martínez 32'; Bautista 82' (pen.); García 90'

Estadio Víctor Manuel Reyna, Tuxtla Gutiérrez
Referee: Manuel Ernesto Glower (Mexico City)

Guadalajara won 6–5 on aggregate.

May 3, 2006
20:30

San Luis	1–0	Atlante
Didi 69'	Report

Estadio Alfonso Lastras, San Luis Potosí
Referee: Marco Antonio Rodríguez (Mexico City)
May 6, 2006
19:00

Atlante	0–0	San Luis
	Report

Estadio Azteca, Mexico City
Referee: Adolfo Aquino Benítez (Guerrero)

San Luis won 1–0 on aggregate.

May 3, 2006
15:00

Toluca	2–1	Cruz Azul
Valadéz 9'; Sánchez 45'	Report	Villaluz 82'

Estadio Nemesio Díez, Toluca
Referee: Jorge Eduardo Gasso (Mexico City)
May 6, 2006
17:00

Cruz Azul	1–1	Toluca
Sabah 90'	Report	Caniza 7' (o.g.)

Estadio Azul, Mexico City
Referee: Armando Archundia (Estado de México)

Toluca won 3–2 on aggregate.

=== Semifinals ===
May 11, 2006
20:45

Guadalajara	1–2	Pachuca
Patlán 50'	Report	Núñez 52'; Castro 88' (o.g.)

Estadio Jalisco, Guadalajara
Referee: Germán Arredondo Ramírez (Guanajuato)
May 14, 2006
17:00

Pachuca	2–3	Guadalajara
Núñez 58' (pen.); Mosquera 90+3'	Report	Esparza 38'; Bautista 64' (pen.), 70'

Estadio Hidalgo, Pachuca
Referee: Manuel Ernesto Glower (Mexico City)

4–4 on aggregate. Pachuca advanced for being the higher seeded team.

May 10, 2006
15:00

Toluca	1–2	San Luis
Abundis 75'	Report	Olmedo 41'; Reyna 62'

Estadio Nemesio Díez, Toluca
Referee: Mauricio Morales (Mexico City)
May 13, 2006
20:30

San Luis	2–1	Toluca
Reyna 18'; Valdez 50'	Report	López 52'

Estadio Alfonso Lastras, San Luis Potosí
Referee: Marco Antonio Rodríguez (Mexico City)

San Luis won 4–2 on aggregate.

=== Finals ===
May 18, 2006
20:30

San Luis	0–0	Pachuca
	Report

Estadio Alfonso Lastras, San Luis Potosí
Referee: Jorge Eduardo Gasso (Mexico City)
May 21, 2006
17:00

Pachuca	1–0	San Luis
Núñez 78' (pen.)	Report

Estadio Hidalgo, Pachuca
Referee: Armando Archundia (Estado de México)

Pachuca won 1–0 on aggregate.

Champions

4th title

== Relegation ==
Pos.	Team	Pts.	Pld.	Ave.
14.	Santos Laguna	136	106	1.2830
15.	Atlas	129	106	1.2169
16.	Veracruz	128	106	1.2075
17.	San Luis	41	34	1.2058
18.	Sinaloa	82	68	1.2058
