= Primera División de México Clausura 2007 =

Primera División de México
- Season: 2006−07
- Champions: Pachuca (5th title)
- Relegated: Querétaro
- Champions' Cup: Pachuca
- Interliga: Necaxa; America; Morelia; Monterrey; Cruz Azul; UANL; Chiapas; UAG
- Copa Sudamericana: Pachuca; America
- SuperLiga: Pachuca; America; Guadalajara; Morelia
- Top goalscorer: Omar Bravo (11 goals)

Primera División de México (Mexican First Division) Clausura 2007 is a Mexican football tournament - one of two short tournaments that take up the entire year - to determine the champion(s) of Mexican football. It began on Friday, January 19, 2007, and ran until April 29, when the regular season ended. UAG and UANL inaugurated the season with a match in which UAG won 2-1. Reigning champions Guadalajara were eliminated in semifinals by archrivals América and thus could not retain their title. Querétaro, who finished last in the percentage table, were relegated to Primera División A at the end of the season. On May 27, Pachuca defeated América 3-2 and became champions for the fifth time.

== Clubs ==
Location of the Primera División Clausura 2006 teams

Team	City	Stadium
América	Mexico City	Azteca
Atlante	Mexico City	Azteca
Atlas	Guadalajara, Jalisco	Jalisco
Chiapas	Tuxtla Gutiérrez, Chiapas	Víctor Manuel Reyna
Cruz Azul	Mexico City	Azul
Guadalajara	Guadalajara, Jalisco	Jalisco
Morelia	Morelia, Michoacán	Morelos
Monterrey	Monterrey, Nuevo León	Tecnológico
Necaxa	Aguascalientes, Aguascalientes	Victoria
Pachuca	Pachuca, Hidalgo	Hidalgo
Querétaro	Querétaro, Querétaro	Corregidora
San Luis	San Luis Potosí, S.L.P.	Alfonso Lastras
Santos Laguna	Torreón, Coahuila	Corona
Toluca	Toluca, State of Mexico	Nemesio Díez
UAG	Zapopan, Jalisco	Tres de Marzo
UANL	San Nicolás de los Garza, Nuevo León	Universitario
UNAM	Mexico City	Olímpico Universitario
Veracruz	Veracruz, Veracruz	Luis "Pirata" Fuente

== Regular phase ==
Group 1
Pos	Team	Pld	W	D	L	GF	GA	GD	Pts	Qualification
1	Guadalajara	17	9	4	4	27	14	+13	31	Directly qualified to the Liguilla (Playoffs)
2	Cruz Azul	17	8	4	5	22	17	+5	28	Directly qualified to the Liguilla (Playoffs)
3	Atlas	17	7	4	6	20	17	+3	25	Qualified for the Repechage
4	Querétaro	17	4	7	6	15	20	−5	19	
5	Chiapas	17	5	4	8	16	26	−10	19	
6	Necaxa	17	4	6	7	19	26	−7	18	

Source: MedioTiempo

Group 2
Pos	Team	Pld	W	D	L	GF	GA	GD	Pts	Qualification
1	Pachuca	17	12	3	2	36	12	+24	39	Directly qualified to the Liguilla (Playoffs)
2	UAG	17	6	7	4	30	23	+7	25	Directly qualified to the Liguilla (Playoffs)
3	San Luis	17	7	3	7	21	23	−2	24	Qualified for the Repechage
4	Atlante	17	6	3	8	21	27	−6	21	
5	Monterrey	17	5	4	8	17	23	−6	19	
6	Veracruz	17	3	3	11	11	33	−22	12	

Source: MedioTiempo

Group 3
Pos	Team	Pld	W	D	L	GF	GA	GD	Pts	Qualification
1	América	17	9	3	5	26	15	+11	30	Directly qualified to the Liguilla (Playoffs)
2	UANL	17	6	5	6	17	20	−3	23	Directly qualified to the Liguilla (Playoffs)
3	Santos Laguna	17	6	4	7	21	20	+1	22	Qualified for the Repechage
4	Morelia	17	7	1	9	23	25	−2	22	Qualified for the Repechage
5	UNAM	17	3	11	3	19	18	+1	20	
6	Toluca	17	3	10	4	15	17	−2	19	

Source: MedioTiempo

== League table ==
Pos	Team	Pld	W	D	L	GF	GA	GD	Pts	Qualification
1	Pachuca	17	12	3	2	36	12	+24	39	Directly qualified to the Liguilla (Playoffs)
2	Guadalajara	17	9	4	4	27	14	+13	31	Directly qualified to the Liguilla (Playoffs)
3	América	17	9	3	5	26	15	+11	30	Directly qualified to the Liguilla (Playoffs)
4	Cruz Azul	17	8	4	5	22	17	+5	28	Directly qualified to the Liguilla (Playoffs)
5	UAG	17	6	7	4	30	23	+7	25	Directly qualified to the Liguilla (Playoffs)
6	Atlas	17	7	4	6	20	17	+3	25	Qualified for the Repechage
7	San Luis	17	7	3	7	21	23	−2	24	Qualified for the Repechage
8	UANL	17	6	5	6	17	20	−3	23	Directly qualified to the Liguilla (Playoffs)
9	Santos Laguna	17	6	4	7	21	20	+1	22	Qualified for the Repechage
10	Morelia	17	7	1	9	23	25	−2	22	Qualified for the Repechage
11	Atlante	17	6	3	8	21	27	−6	21	
12	UNAM	17	3	11	3	19	18	+1	20	
13	Toluca	17	3	10	4	15	17	−2	19	
14	Querétaro	17	4	7	6	15	20	−5	19	
15	Monterrey	17	5	4	8	17	23	−6	19	
16	Chiapas	17	5	4	8	16	26	−10	19	
17	Necaxa	17	4	6	7	19	26	−7	18	
18	Veracruz	17	3	3	11	11	33	−22	12	

Source: MedioTiempo

== Relegation ==
Pos	Team	Total Pts	Games	P/G
14	UANL	127	102	1.2451
15	UNAM	124	102	1.2157
16	Veracruz	122	102	1.1961
17	Santos Laguna	117	102	1.1471
18	Querétaro	37	34	1.0882

== Top goalscorers ==
Players sorted first by goals scored, then by last name. Only regular season goals listed.

Rank	Player	Club	Goals
1	(Mexico) Omar Bravo	Guadalajara	11
2	(Argentina) Javier Cámpora	Chiapas	10
3	(Uruguay) Gustavo Biscayzacú	Atlante	8
3	(Mexico) Juan Carlos Cacho	Pachuca	8
5	(Mexico) Fernando Arce	Morelia	7
5	(Chile) Hugo Droguett	UAG	7
5	(Argentina) Christian Giménez	Pachuca	7
5	(Argentina) Emanuel Villa	UAG	7
9	(Paraguay) Salvador Cabañas	América	6
9	(Argentina) Leandro Gracián	Monterrey	6
9	(Uruguay) Richard Núñez	Cruz Azul	6
9	(Mexico) Miguel Sabah	Cruz Azul	6

Source: MedioTiempo

== Results ==
Home \ Away	AME	UNA	GDL	UAN	TEC	CHP	SAN	TOL	VER	CAZ	PAC	SLP	ATL	ATE	MOR	MON	NEC	QUE
América			1–0		2–1	4–1	2–0			0–0		4–1	0–1	1–0				2–0
UNAM	1–1		0–0			2–0	2–1			0–1		1–1	0–0					3–3
Guadalajara				1–0	2–2			1–1	4–0		0–1				2–1	1–1		2–0
UANL	1–0	1–1						0–2	1–0		2–0	1–1		1–0		3–3	1–1	
UAG		2–2		2–1				0–0	3–0		3–4				2–0	2–0	2–1	
Chiapas			1–0	2–3	1–1		1–1		0–2	2–2				2–1	2–1			2–0
Santos Laguna			2–3	0–1	1–1			2–1	1–0	2–0				3–0	2–1			0–0
Toluca	2–2	2–2				0–0					0–2	1–1	0–0	2–4		1–0	1–1	
Veracruz	2–4	2–1						0–1			0–5	2–1	0–1	0–1		0–0	1–1	
Cruz Azul			1–2	3–0	1–0			0–0	4–2		3–2				3–2			0–0
Pachuca	1–0	0–0				3–0	1–0					3–0	4–2			4–0	1–1	
San Luis			1–0		0–2	1–0	2–3			2–0			0–1	3–0	1–2			1–0
Atlas			0–2	2–0	4–1	0–1	3–3			1–0				1–1	2–0			2–0
Atlante		1–1	0–3		2–2					1–0	1–4					2–0	3–0	3–1
Morelia	2–1	2–1		0–0				2–1	5–0		0–1			3–1		1–0	0–1	
Monterrey	1–0	0–1				2–0	1–0			1–2		3–2	2–0				2–2	
Necaxa	1–2	1–1	2–4			3–1	1–0			0–2		1–2	2–1					
Querétaro				2–1	2–2			0–0	0–0		0–0				3–1	2–1	2–0	

Legend: Blue = home team win; Yellow = draw; Red = away team win.

== Final phase (Liguilla) ==
=== Repechage ===
2 May 2007
16:00

Santos Laguna	0–1	San Luis
	Report	Luna 57'

Estadio Corona, Torreón
Referee: Mauricio Morales (Mexico City)
5 May 2007
18:30

San Luis	0–2	Santos Laguna
	Report	Ortíz 73'; Jiménez 90+2'

Estadio Alfonso Lastras, San Luis Potosí
Referee: Manuel Ernesto Glower (Mexico City)

Santos Laguna won 2–1 on aggregate.

2 May 2007
21:00

Morelia	1–1	Atlas
Sánchez 85'	Report	Balcázar 10'

Estadio Morelos, Morelia
Referee: José Gabriel Gómez (Morelos)
5 May 2007
20:45

Atlas	0–0	Morelia
	Report

Estadio Jalisco, Guadalajara
Referee: Fabián Delgado Horcasitas (Morelos)

1–1 on aggregate. Atlas advanced for being the higher seeded team.

=== Bracket ===
Quarterfinals
1	Pachuca (s)	1	1	2
9	Santos Laguna	1	1	2
4	Cruz Azul	1	1	2
5	UAG	0	0	0
2	Guadalajara	3	3	6
8	UANL	1	2	3
3	América	3	4	7
6	Atlas	3	1	4

Semifinals
1	Pachuca (w/o)	3	x	3
4	Cruz Azul	1	x	1
2	Guadalajara	0	0	0
3	América	1	1	2

Finals
1	Pachuca	2	1	3
3	América	1	1	2

=== Quarterfinals ===
9 May 2007
18:30

UANL	1–3	Guadalajara
Fonseca 72'	Report	Martínez 20'; Medina 71'; Esparza 80'

Estadio Universitario, San Nicolás de los Garza
Referee: Roberto García Orozco (Mexico City)
12 May 2007
20:00

Guadalajara	3–2	UANL
Rivas 43' (o.g.); Saavedra 75' (o.g.); Bautista 90' (pen.)	Report	Lozano 28' (pen.); Fonseca 82' (pen.)

Estadio Jalisco, Guadalajara
Referee: Germán Arredondo Ramírez (Guanajuato)

Guadalajara won 6–3 on aggregate.

9 May 2007
20:30

UAG	0–1	Cruz Azul
	Report	Núñez 31'

Estadio Tres de Marzo, Zapopan
Referee: Jaime Herrera Garduño (Mexico City)
12 May 2007
17:00

Cruz Azul	1–0	UAG
Núñez 47'	Report

Estadio Azul, Mexico City
Referee: Marco Antonio Rodríguez (Mexico City)

Cruz Azul won 2–0 on aggregate.

10 May 2007
18:00

Santos Laguna	1–1	Pachuca
Marcón 21'	Report	Caballero 9'

Estadio Corona, Torreón
Referee: Fabián Delgado Horcasitas (Morelos)
13 May 2007
20:00

Pachuca	1–1	Santos Laguna
Salazar 62'	Report	Jiménez 67'

Estadio Hidalgo, Pachuca
Referee: Armando Archundia (Estado de México)

2–2 on aggregate. Pachuca advanced for being the higher seeded team.

10 May 2007
20:45

Atlas	3–3	América
Pérez 35'; Guardado 74'; Olivera 87' (pen.)	Report	Cabañas 4', 80'; Infante 59'

Estadio Jalisco, Guadalajara
Referee: Jorge Eduardo Gasso (Mexico City)
13 May 2007
17:00

América	4–1	Atlas
Blanco 13', 76' (pen.); Fernández 38'; Mosqueda 81'	Report	Navia 47'

Estadio Azteca, Mexico City
Referee: Paul Delgadillo (Jalisco)

América won 7–4 on aggregate.

=== Semifinals ===
17 May 2007
18:00

Cruz Azul	1–3	Pachuca
Borgetti 45' (pen.)	Report	Caballero 20'; Giménez 34' (pen.), 62'

Estadio Azul, Mexico City
Referee: Paul Delgadillo (Jalisco)
20 May 2007
20:00

Pachuca	w/o	Cruz Azul
	Report

Estadio Hidalgo, Pachuca
Referee: Hugo León Guajardo (Mexico City)

Pachuca were awarded a walkover after Cruz Azul was suspended one match for fielding suspended player Salvador Carmona in the first leg.

17 May 2007
20:30

América	1–0	Guadalajara
Cabañas 61'	Report

Estadio Azteca, Mexico City
Referee: Mauricio Morales (Mexico City)
20 May 2007
18:00

Guadalajara	0–1	América
	Report	Rodríguez 76'

Estadio Jalisco, Guadalajara
Referee: Jorge Eduardo Gasso (Mexico City)

América won 2–0 on aggregate.

=== Finals ===
25 May 2007
20:30

América	1–2	Pachuca
Blanco 82' (pen.)	Report	Cacho 53', 75'

Estadio Azteca, Mexico City
Referee: Mauricio Morales (Mexico City)
27 May 2007
20:10

Pachuca	1–1	América
Cacho 82'	Report	Blanco 68'

Estadio Hidalgo, Pachuca
Referee: Marco Antonio Rodríguez (Mexico City)

Pachuca won 3–2 on aggregate.

Champions

5th title

== Doping scandal ==
Salvador Carmona of Cruz Azul was charged of doping before his semifinal match against Pachuca. Regardless, Isaac Mizrahi, Cruz Azul's coach, illegally included Carmona in the starting lineup. For this, the FMF fined Cruz Azul a one-game suspension, thus disqualifying them from playing the semifinal's second leg. This means that Cruz Azul was prematurely eliminated from the playoffs, and that Pachuca were automatically qualified for the final.

The Court of Arbitration for Sport has imposed a much harsher punishment on Carmona: he is banned from playing any professional match anywhere in the world for life, thus ending his career early.
