= Manuel Corona =

Manuel Corona may refer to:

- Manuel Corona (musician) (1880–1950), Cuban musician
- Manuel Corona (footballer), German footballer
