= Juan de Dios Ibarra =

Mexican footballer (born 1979)

Personal information
- Full name: Juan de Dios Ibarra Corral
- Date of birth: 17 February 1979 (age 47)
- Place of birth: Los Mochis, Sinaloa, Mexico
- Height: 1.86 m (6 ft 1 in)
- Position: Goalkeeper

Team information
- Current team: Venados (goalkeeping coach)

Youth career
- Monterrey

Senior career*
Years	Team	Apps	(Gls)
2002–2005	Monterrey	40	(0)
2005–2006	América	1	(0)
2007–2008	Monterrey	0	(0)
2008–2009	Durango	15	(0)
2009	Tampico Madero	16	(0)
2009–2010	Lobos BUAP	36	(0)
2010–2016	Monterrey	18	(0)
2016– 2017	Puebla	0	(0)

Managerial career
- 2019: Dorados (Assistant)
- 2024–: Venados (goalkeeping coach)
- * Club domestic league appearances and goals

Juan de Dios Ibarra Corral (born 17 February 1979) is a Mexican former professional footballer who played as a goalkeeper.

Juan de Dios is also brother of Pierre Ibarra player of Necaxa.

== Career ==
Ibarra began his career at CF Monterrey, where after spending several years in the youth squads, made his debut at the professional level on February 10, 2002, in a game against Celaya. In his first full game, Ibarra made a favorable impression by shutting out Chivas by a score of 3–0. His initial success prompted then-coach, José Treviño, to name him the starter. Ibarra responded by allowing 21 goals in 12 games. However, the following season he would be benched, only seeing action in two games. The next season, Ibarra filled in for starting goalkeeper Ricardo Martínez in 11 games, while Martínez recovered from an injury. Juan de Dios stepped up to the challenge and allowed only 14 goals in that span. However, when Martínez returned, Ibarra was relegated to the bench and watched from the sidelines as Monterrey won the championship that very season, under Argentine coach Daniel Passarella.

After two more years of scattered play at CF Monterrey, he was transferred to América before the start of the Apertura 2005 season, where he was placed as second on the depth chart, behind Guillermo Ochoa. His only start that season came against his former team, in a game where he allowed all four goals in a 4–1 loss.

He returned to his first team CF Monterrey on December 21, 2007, but only played for their Primera A filial team. Ibarra later went on to play for Alacranes de Durango in 2008. For the start of the Clausura 2009 tourney, he was transferred to Jaibos Tampico Madero.

Ibarra was transferred yet again for the Apertura 2009 season, this time to Lobos BUAP.

In 2010 Ibarra returned to Monterrey for the Apertura 2010 season.

== International career ==
Ibarra was part of the Mexico U-20 team that competed in the 1999 FIFA World Youth Championship held in Nigeria, as a back-up goalkeeper. He did not feature in Mexico's 5 games.

== Honours ==
Monterrey

- Mexican Primera División: Clausura 2003, Apertura 2010
- CONCACAF Champions League: 2010–11, 2011–12
