= Abraham Ávalos =

Mexican footballer (born 1991)

Abraham Avalos
Personal information
- Full name: Abraham Josué Avalos Ceja
- Date of birth: January 29, 1991 (age 35)
- Place of birth: Jiquilpan, Michoacán, Mexico
- Height: 1.84 m (6 ft 1/2 in)
- Position: Forward

Team information
- Current team: Zacatepec
- Number: 35

Youth career
- 2008: Gallos Blancos de San Juan del Río
- 2009: Club Sahuayo
- 2009–2011: Querétaro Sub-20
- 2011: Club Deportivo Yurécuaro
- 2011–: Irapuato

Senior career*
Years	Team	Apps	(Gls)
2012–2013	Irapuato	23	(6)
2013–	Zacatepec	0	(0)
- * Club domestic league appearances and goals as of 9 November 2012

Abraham Josué Avalos Ceja (born January 29, 1991) is a Mexican footballer who plays as a forward for Irapuato FC. Abraham is also in Irapuato's Youth Team Along with his teammate Gustavo Guillen However both are frequently used in the first team. he is called Pachu by fans.

== Career ==
Avalos made his senior team debut on April 4, 2012, versus La Piedad in a 3–0 loss, wearing #55 on his shirt. he scored his first goal with Irapuato's senior team on March 24, 2012, versus Lobos BUAP in a 2–0 win, in that game he scored the two goals and he made the first goal 30 meters out. Avalos is still Playing for Irapuato's youth team in the Liga de Nuevos Talentos alongside his teammate Gustavo Guillen .

== Club statistics ==
As of 9 November 2012

Club	Season	League		Copa MX		Total	
Club	Season	Apps	Goals	Apps	Goals	Apps	Goals
Irapuato	2011–12	7	2	-	-	7	2
Irapuato	2012–13	12	3	4	1	16	5
Irapuato	Total	19	5	4	1	23	6
