= Sergio Arias =

Mexican footballer (born 1988)

Personal information
- Full name: Sergio Javier Arias Delgado
- Date of birth: 27 February 1988 (age 38)
- Place of birth: Ahome, Sinaloa, Mexico
- Height: 1.90 m (6 ft 3 in)
- Position: Goalkeeper

Team information
- Current team: Tapatío (Goalkeeper coach)

Youth career
- 2005–2006: Guadalajara

Senior career*
Years	Team	Apps	(Gls)
2006–2010	Guadalajara	0	(0)
2007–2009	→ Dorados (loan)	36	(0)
2011	→ Chivas USA (loan)	0	(0)
2011–2013	→ Irapuato (loan)	42	(0)
2013–2014	→ Oaxaca (loan)	17	(0)
2014	→ Coras (loan)	14	(0)
2015	Mérida	12	(0)
2015–2016	BUAP	13	(0)
2016–2017	Cimarrones de Sonora	17	(0)

International career
2005	Mexico U17	9	(0)
2006–2007	Mexico U23	8	(0)

Managerial career
- 2019–2021: CAFESSA Jalisco (Goalkeeper coach)
- 2021–2022: Oaxaca (Goalkeeper coach)
- 2023–: Tapatío (Goalkeeper coach)
Medal record
Men's football
Representing Mexico
FIFA U-17 World Cup
Winner	2005 Peru
- * Club domestic league appearances and goals as of 22 August 2017

Sergio Javier Arias Delgado (Note: In this Spanish name, the first or paternal surname is Arias and the second or maternal family name is Delgado.) (born 27 February 1988) is a Mexican retired footballer as goalkeeper.

== Club career ==
Arias has played in Chivas' youth division teams and began playing for the Tapatío squad in the 2006 Season. He has yet to make his debut in the Primera División with Chivas. Shortly after the 2005 FIFA U-17 World Championship Hércules CF, at that time a second division club from Spain, was interested in signing him, which would have made him the second player that never had an official debut in the Mexico first division to be signed by a European club, alongside Carlos Vela from Chivas. In 2007, he was loaned to Dorados de Sinaloa and quickly established himself as the club's top keeper, appearing in 36 league matches.

On 9 March 2011, Arias was loaned by Chivas de Guadalajara to American side Chivas USA. After one season in Major League Soccer he returned to Mexico for 2012 with second division side Irapuato FC, on loan from Chivas.

== International ==
Arias was the starting goalkeeper of the Mexico national team that won the 2005 FIFA U-17 World Championship against Brazil. He had a good tournament, playing well and only allowing 3 goals in 9 matches. He was praised by the Mexican press as the "new" Oswaldo Sanchez.

Arias was cut from the final list for the 2007 FIFA U-20 World Cup, being the only player from the starting eleven that won the U-17 World Championship that did not come back for the U-20 Championship. Even though he did not make the 23 man list for the U-20 World Cup held in Canada in 2007, he was called up to play for the Mexico national team at the 2007 Panamerican Games being held in Rio de Jainero. He was a starter in all the group stage games and was proven victorious by eventually earning the bronze medal in the competition.

== Honours ==
Guadalajara

- Copa Libertadores runner-up: 2010

Mexico U17

- FIFA U-17 World Championship: 2005
