= Eduardo dos Santos (footballer, born 1983) =

Argentine footballer

Personal information
- Full name: Eduardo César dos Santos
- Date of birth: 14 October 1983 (age 43)
- Place of birth: Quilmes, Buenos Aires, Argentina
- Height: 1.79 m (5 ft 10 in)
- Position: Forward

Youth career
- Estudiantes BA

Senior career*
Years	Team	Apps	(Gls)
2005	Estudiantes BA	3	(0)
2005–2006	Talleres RE	29	(5)
2006–2007	Defensores de Belgrano	35	(7)
2007–2008	Douglas Haig	30	(12)
2008–2009	Almagro	31	(5)
2009	Rangers	6	(0)
2010–2011	Orizaba	50	(10)
2011–2012	La Piedad	28	(5)
2012	Irapuato	9	(0)
2013–2015	Correcaminos UAT	32	(4)
2014–2015	→ Altamira (loan)	29	(4)
2016–2018	Sacachispas	84	(34)
2018–2019	Deportivo Laferrere	26	(2)
2019–2020	Sacachispas	16	(0)
- * Club domestic league appearances and goals

Eduardo César dos Santos (born October 14, 1983, in Quilmes, Buenos Aires, Argentina) is a former Argentine footballer who played as a forward.

== Career ==
A football forward, Dos Santos played in Chile and Mexico in addition to his homeland.

In Chile, he played for Rangers de Talca in the second half of 2009.

Dos Santos played in Mexico from 2010 to 2015. He had stints with Albinegros de Orizaba, La Piedad, Irapuato, Correcaminos UAT and Estudiantes de Altamira.

Back in Argentina, he ended his career with Deportivo Laferrere and Sacachispas.
