= Estadio Hidalgo =

Football stadium in Pachuca, Hidalgo, Mexico

Coordinates: 20°6′19″N 98°45′22″W

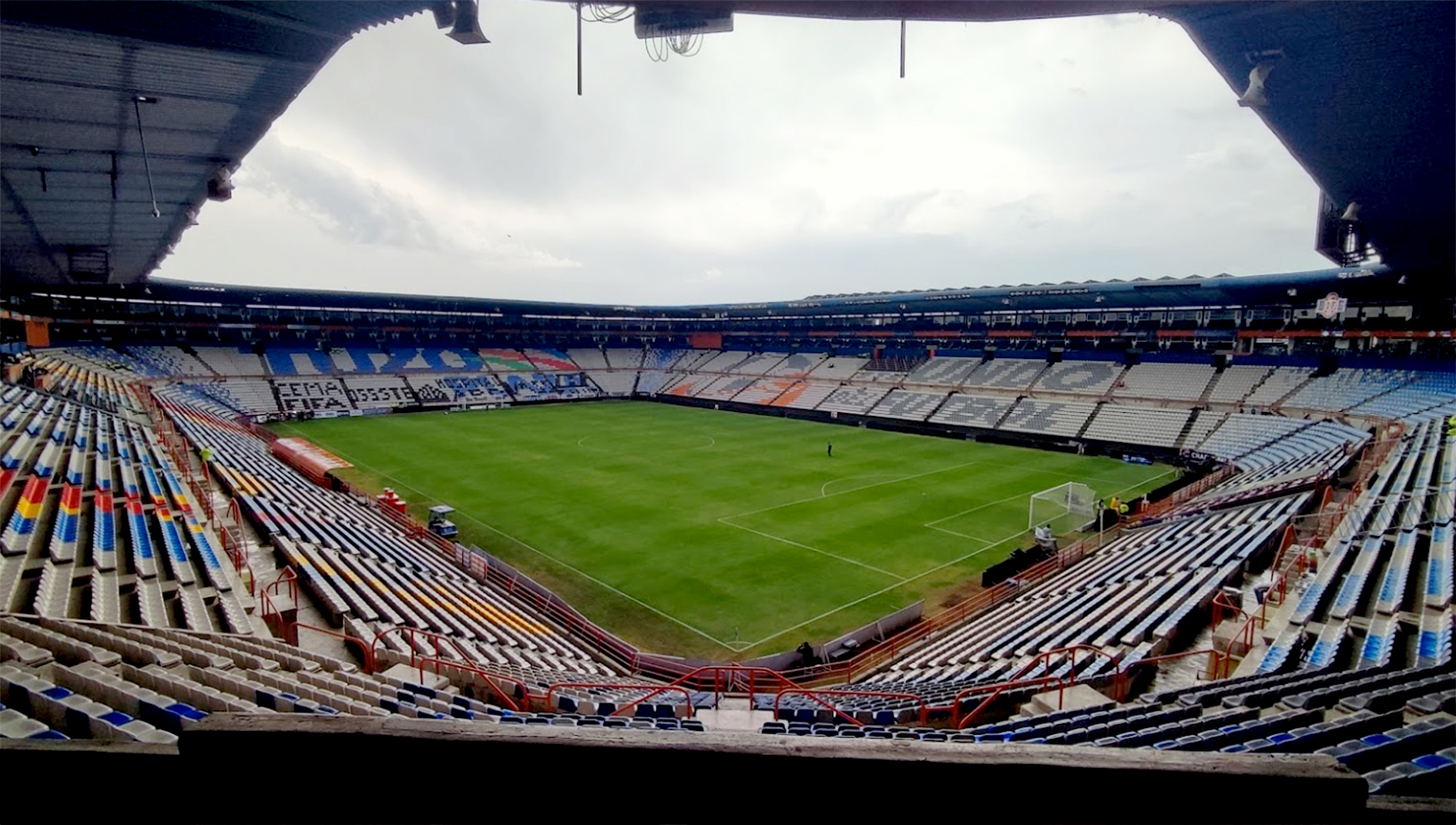
- Interactive map of Estadio Hidalgo
- Location: Pachuca, Hidalgo, Mexico
- Owner: State of Hidalgo
- Operator: Grupo Pachuca
- Capacity: 25,922
- Surface: Grass

Construction
- Opened: 14 January 1993; 33 years ago

Tenants
- Pachuca (1993–present); Pachuca Femenil (2017–present); Toros Neza as Toros Hidalgo (1994 temporary)

The Estadio Hidalgo is a football stadium located in Pachuca, Hidalgo, Mexico. It is the home stadium of Pachuca in Liga MX and Pachuca Femenil in Liga MX Femenil. The stadium was inaugurated in 1993 and has a capacity of 25,922 seats. It is the highest sports center in the state of Hidalgo and its name, like that of the state, is in honor of Miguel Hidalgo y Costilla the father of the Independence of Mexico.

Nicknamed "El Huracán" (The Hurricane), due to the great dominance of CF Pachuca in its golden era playing at home, saying "the team at home plays devastating like a hurricane". The stadium was remodeled and modernized under the administration of Grupo Pachuca, for which it was reopened on 1 August 2004.

== Football events ==
In top level national competitions, the stadium has hosted Liga MX, Copa MX, Campeón de Campeones and Liga MX Femenil.

The stadium has hosted matches from 5 different international club competitions, which are CONCACAF Champions Cup/Champions League, Copa Libertadores, Copa Sudamericana, Recopa Sudamericana and Copa Merconorte.

It was also one of the host stadiums for the 2011 FIFA U-17 World Cup, with 9 matches. The most notable matches were the victories of the Mexico under-17 team, first beating Panamá 2–0 in the round of 16 and then beating France 2–1 in the quarterfinals.

=== Primera División de México/Liga MX finals ===
Season	Home	Result	Away	Match date
Invierno 1999	Pachuca	2–2	Cruz Azul	16 December 1999 (First leg)
Verano 2001	Pachuca	2–1	Santos Laguna	17 May 2001 (First leg)
Invierno 2001	Pachuca	2–0	Tigres UANL	12 December 2001 (First leg)
Apertura 2003	Pachuca	3–1	Tigres UANL	17 December 2003 (First leg)
Clausura 2006	Pachuca	1–0	San Luis	21 May 2006 (Second leg)
Clausura 2007	Pachuca	1–1	América	27 May 2007 (Second leg)
Clausura 2009	Pachuca	2–2	Pumas UNAM	31 May 2009 (Second leg)
Clausura 2014	Pachuca	0–2	León	18 May 2014 (Second leg)
Clausura 2016	Pachuca	1–0	Monterrey	26 May 2016 (First leg)
Clausura 2022	Pachuca	2–1	Atlas	29 May 2022 (Second leg)
Apertura 2022	Pachuca	3–1	Toluca	30 October 2022 (Second leg)

=== International finals ===
Season	Home	Result	Away	Match date
2006 Copa Sudamericana	Pachuca	1–1	Colo-Colo	30 November 2006 (First leg)
2007 CONCACAF Champions' Cup	Pachuca	0–0 (7–6 p)	Guadalajara	25 April 2007 (Second leg)
2007 Recopa Sudamericana	Pachuca	2–1	Internacional	31 May 2007 (First leg)
2008 CONCACAF Champions' Cup	Pachuca	2–1	Saprissa	30 April 2008 (Second leg)
2009–10 CONCACAF Champions League	Pachuca	1–0	Cruz Azul	28April 2010 (Second leg)
2016–17 CONCACAF Champions League	Pachuca	1–0	Tigres UANL	26 April 2017 (Second leg)
2024 CONCACAF Champions Cup	Pachuca	3–0	Columbus Crew	1 June 2024 (Single match)

== See also ==
- List of football stadiums in Mexico
