= Alberto Lucio =

Mexican footballer (born 1985)

Personal information
- Full name: Alberto Lucio Centeno
- Date of birth: 26 January 1985 (age 41)
- Place of birth: Morelia, Mexico
- Height: 1.82 m (6 ft 0 in)
- Position: Defender

Senior career*
Years	Team	Apps	(Gls)
2008–2009	Atlético Morelia	10	(0)
2009–2010	Venados F.C.	33	(0)
2010–2011	Atlético Morelia	5	(0)
2011–2013	Toros Neza	47	(1)
2013–2014	Delfines F.C.	21	(0)
2014–2016	Lobos BUAP	47	(0)
2016–2017	Cafetaleros de Chiapas	12	(0)
Total		175	(1)
- * Club domestic league appearances and goals

Alberto Lucio Centeno (born 26 January 1985 in Morelia, Michoacán) is a former Mexican football defender, who played for Monarcas Morelia in the Primera Division de Mexico.

He made his Primera Division debut against Dorados de Sinaloa in 2005 under former Morelia head coach Ricardo Ferretti.
