= Pierre Ibarra =

Mexican footballer (born 1983)

Personal information
- Full name: Pierre Leonardo Ibarra Corral
- Date of birth: 18 January 1983 (age 43)
- Place of birth: Los Mochis, Sinaloa, Mexico
- Height: 1.74 m (5 ft 8 1/2 in)
- Positions: Defender (outdoor); Forward (indoor)

Youth career
- –2002: Monterrey

Senior career*
Years	Team	Apps	(Gls)
2002–2009	Raya2 Expansión	55	(4)
2003–2004	→ Cobras (loan)	39	(1)
2004–2015	Monterrey	75	(3)
2009–2010	→ Necaxa (loan)	31	(2)
2011–2012	→ Necaxa (loan)	34	(1)
2012–2013	→ Lobos BUAP (loan)	28	(0)
2013–2014	→ UAT (loan)	23	(1)
2014–2015	→ Oaxaca (loan)	21	(3)
2015–2016	Murciélagos	27	(2)
2016–2017	UAT	15	(0)
2018–2019	El Paso Coyotes (indoor)	1	(1)
- * Club domestic league appearances and goals

Pierre Leonardo Ibarra Corral (born 18 January 1983) is a Mexican former football defender.

Pierre also is brother of Juan de Dios Ibarra, former goalkeeper of Monterrey.
