= Francisco Razo =

Mexican footballer (born 1985)

Personal information
- Full name: Francisco Razo Miranda
- Date of birth: 3 February 1985 (age 41)
- Place of birth: Irapuato, Mexico
- Height: 1.78 m (5 ft 10 in)
- Position: Defender

Senior career*
| Years | Team | Apps | (Gls) |
| 2008–2013 | Irapuato FC | 49 | (0) |
- * Club domestic league appearances and goals as of 1 February 2013

Francisco Razo (born February 3, 1985) is a former Mexican professional footballer who last played for Irapuato FC.

== Honours ==
=== Club ===
Irapuato

- Ascenso MX: Clausura 2011
- Ascenso MX runner up: Apertura 2009
