= Ismael Rodríguez (footballer) =

Mexican footballer (born 1981)

Personal information
- Full name: Ismael de Jesús Rodríguez Vega
- Date of birth: 10 January 1981 (age 45)
- Place of birth: Ciudad Madero, Mexico
- Height: 1.83 m (6 ft 0 in)
- Position: Left-back

Senior career*
Years	Team	Apps	(Gls)
2001–2005	Monterrey	111	(9)
2005–2012	Club América	100	(7)
2011	→ Querétaro (loan)	2	(0)
2012–2013	Irapuato	17	(1)
2014	C.D. Águila	15	(2)

International career
2003–2009	Mexico	6	(0)
Medal record
Representing Mexico
CONCACAF Gold Cup
Winner	CONCACAF Gold Cup	2009
- * Club domestic league appearances and goals

Ismael de Jesús Rodríguez Vega (born 10 January 1981) is a Mexican former footballer, who last played for C.D. Águila in the Primera División de Fútbol de El Salvador.

== Career ==
Trained in the C.F. Monterrey youth system, Ismael debuted in the México Primera División on 21 July 2001 in a game against UNAM Pumas. He quickly won a starting job and became a fixture in Monterrey's backline. During the Rayados title run in the Clausura 2003 tournament, Rodríguez played in 18 games and scored two goals, including a crucial score against Club Atlas in the playoff quarterfinals. His continued success at the club level brought him to the attention of Mexico national team coaches and personnel. In 2004, Rodríguez played for Mexico at the 2004 Olympic Summer Games.

Prior to the Apertura 2005 tournament, Ismael was transferred to Club América, who were at the time reigning champions of the Mexico league. An established starter at his previous club, Rodríguez was mostly a bench warmer at the beginning of the season; he saw significantly more action towards the end of the tournament.

== International career ==
It was not until Javier Aguirre came to coach the Mexico squad that Ismael Rodriguez finally got a chance to play with the Mexico Squad. He became one of Aguirre's main men because he started in every Gold Cup game.

=== International caps ===
As of 19 July 2009

International appearances
#	Date	Venue	Opponent	Result	Competition
1.	October 15, 2003	Soldier Field, Chicago, United States	Uruguay	0–2	Friendly
2.	June 24, 2009	Georgia Dome, Atlanta, United States	Venezuela	4–0	Friendly
3.	July 5, 2009	Oakland–Alameda County Coliseum, Oakland, California, United States	Nicaragua	2–0	2009 CONCACAF Gold Cup
4.	9 July 2009	Reliant Stadium, Houston, United States	Panama	1–1	2009 CONCACAF Gold Cup
5.	12 July 2009	University of Phoenix Stadium, Glendale, Arizona, United States	Guadeloupe	2–0	2009 CONCACAF Gold Cup
6.	19 July 2009	Cowboys Stadium, Arlington, Texas, United States	Haiti	4–0	2009 CONCACAF Gold Cup

== Honours ==
Mexico U23

- CONCACAF Olympic Qualifying Championship: 2004

Mexico

- CONCACAF Gold Cup: 2009
