= Íñigo Rey =

Mexican footballer (born 1984)

Íñigo Rey Ortega
Personal information
- Full name: Íñigo Rey Ortega
- Date of birth: 19 May 1984 (age 42)
- Place of birth: Mexico City, Mexico
- Height: 1.77 m (5 ft 9 1/2 in)
- Position: Forward

Senior career*
| Years | Team | Apps | (Gls) |
| 2003–2010 | Puebla | 37 | (4) |
| 2003 | → Trotamundos de Tijuana (loan) | 15 | (3) |
| 2006– | → Tampico Madero (loan) | 9 | (0) |
| 2010–2011 | Alacranes de Durango | 34 | (6) |
| 2011–2012 | CF Mérida | 19 | (2) |
| 2012–2013 | Irapuato | 23 | (1) |
- * Club domestic league appearances and goals as of 1 February 2013

Íñigo Rey Ortega (born May 19, 1984) is a former Mexican footballer who last played for Irapuato in the Ascenso MX league in Mexico.

== Family ==
Rey is the third son of Ricardo Rey Bosch and Monica Ortega Kegel. In a relationship with Marimar

== Career ==
In Apertura 2003 he began his career with club Puebla. His debut was against Pumas with a 1–1 draw. He has played with Puebla for 7 years from club's relegation in Clausura 2005 until promotion in Apertura 2008. Currently working at Roche Bobois Santa Fe
