= Orlindo Ayoví =

Ecuadorian footballer (born 1984)

Personal information
- Full name: Orlindo Ayoví Caicedo
- Date of birth: September 15, 1984 (age 42)
- Place of birth: Eloy Alfaro, Esmeraldas, Ecuador
- Height: 1.90 m (6 ft 3 in)
- Position: Striker

Team information
- Current team: Social Sol

Senior career*
| Years | Team | Apps | (Gls) |
| 2004 | L.D.U. Quito | 3 | (0) |
| 2005 | Macará | 5 | (0) |
| 2006 | Imbabura | 33 | (14) |
| 2007 | L.D.U. Quito | 5 | (2) |
| 2007 | Atlético de Rafaela | 12 | (1) |
| 2008 | Deportivo Azogues | 20 | (7) |
| 2009 | El Nacional | 26 | (6) |
| 2010 | ESPOLI | 16 | (2) |
| 2010 | L.D.U. Portoviejo | 7 | (0) |
| 2011 | Imbabura | 32 | (7) |
| 2012 | Olmedo | 18 | (3) |
| 2013 | Irapuato | 11 | (4) |
| 2013 | Independiente del Valle | 1 | (0) |
| 2014 | Mushuc Runa | 7 | (1) |
| 2016– | Social Sol | 1 | (0) |
- * Club domestic league appearances and goals as of 26 September 2013

Orlindo Ayoví Caicedo (born September 15, 1984) is an Ecuadorian footballer currently playing as a striker for Social Sol.

He previously played in Ecuadorian football for L.D.U. Quito (2004 and 2007), Macará (2005), Imbabura (2006 and 2011), Deportivo Azogues (2008), El Nacional (2009), ESPOLI (2010), L.D.U. Portoviejo (2010), Olmedo (2012), Independiente del Valle (2013) and Mushuc Runa (2014), for Argentine club Atlético de Rafaela (2007), and for Mexican club Irapuato (2013).
