= Carlos Balcázar =

Mexican footballer (born 1984)

Personal information
- Full name: Carlos Humberto Balcázar Tamayo
- Date of birth: 9 January 1984 (age 42)
- Place of birth: Guadalajara, Mexico
- Height: 1.74 m (5 ft 9 in)
- Position: Midfielder

Senior career*
Years	Team	Apps	(Gls)
2003–2008	Atlas	78	(1)
2005	→ Coyotes (loan)	13	(2)
2006–2007	→ Académicos	2	(1)
2008–2009	Jaguares	20	(0)
2008–2009	→ Jaguares Reserves	15	(5)
2010	Atlas	3	(0)
2010–2011	→ Leones Negros	5	(0)
2012–2013	Irapuato	20	(2)
- * Club domestic league appearances and goals as of 25 March 2013

Carlos Humberto Balcázar Tamayo (born 9 January 1984) is a Mexican former professional footballer. He last played as a midfielder for Irapuato at the Ascenso MX League in Mexico.

== Biography ==
Born in Guadalajara, he started his career at hometown club Atlas. He also played for the Atlas reserve teams Coyotes de Sonora and Académicos at Primera División A. In January 2008 he left for Chiapas and played at both Primera División and Primera División A (for Jaguares de Tapachula).

In December 2009, he returned to Atlas.
