= Ariel González =

Argentine-Mexican footballer (born 1974)

Personal information
- Full name: Oscar Ariel González Mezzenasco
- Date of birth: 22 October 1974 (age 52)
- Place of birth: Mendoza, Argentina
- Height: 1.72 m (5 ft 7 1/2 in)
- Position: Striker

Youth career
- 1990–1994: Gimnasia

Senior career*
Years	Team	Apps	(Gls)
1994–2000	Gimnasia		
2000–2001	Real San Luis		
2001–2002	Querétaro		(27)
2002–2003	Irapuato	24	(11)
2004	América	15	(4)
2004–2006	San Luis	81	(50)
2006–2007	Pumas	28	(4)
2007	→ San Luis (loan)	11	(1)
2007–2010	Veracruz	39	(9)
2009–2010	→ Irapuato (loan)	35	(26)
2011–2013	Irapuato	69	(21)
2014	Irapuato	6	(11)
- * Club domestic league appearances and goals as of 19 April 2015

Oscar Ariel González Mezzenasco (born October 28, 1974) is a former Argentine naturalized Mexican footballer who last played as a center forward, for Irapuato. He played most of his career in the first and second divisions of Mexican football.

During his career, he won three league championship trophies and was the league's top goal scorer four times. He led the Mexican league teams of Irapuato and San Luis to promotion to the first division on three occasions. He is San Luis's all-time top goal scorer with 51 goals, and he is placed 12th in the all-time goal scoring table for the Mexican Second division with 74 goals in his name. González is known as Apache (Spanish for Native American) during his career for having long hair that resembled the Native Americans.

González retired from professional football in 2013 at the age of 38, but came out of retirement in November 2014.

== Club career ==
=== Gimnasia ===
Ariel Gonzalez began his football career at Argentine First Division team Club de Gimnasia y Esgrima La Plata in 1994. Ariel Gonzalez reached second place in the league on three occasions with Gimnasia during the 1995 Clausura tournament, 1996 Clausura tournament and, 1998 Apertura tournament. Shortly after he left Argentina to play in the Mexican Primera A, the second tier of Mexican football, with Real San Luis.

=== Real San Luis ===
Ariel debuted in Mexico during the Clausura 2000 season with Real San Luis. In his second season with Real San Luis, Ariel was 6th in the goal scoring table with 11 goals for Real San Luis in his name. After 2 seasons in the second division with Real San Luis, Ariel Gonzalez was traded to Querétaro in the Second Division in July 2001.

=== Querétaro ===
Ariel Gonzalez moved to Querétaro for the Invierno 2001 season which he was placed 3rd in the goal scoring table with 12 goals to his name. Querétaro had the best attack in that season with 33 goals. Ariel's second season at that team was probably his best since he won the title of top goal scorer of the league with 15 goals scoring almost half of the team's goals of the season (31). Ariel was then traded to Irapuato FC in July 2002.

=== Irapuato ===
Ariel moved to Irapuato for the Apertura 2002 season. In his first season with the team he won the Second Division title with Irapuato beating La Piedad in the Final though penalties in which Ariel missed his penalty but Irapuato still won. During the playoffs in that season he contributed by scoring against Oaxaca in the quarter-finals on December 4, 2002, and once again in the semi-final against Tapatio. Ariel played both legs of the finals as a starter and was not substituted. After the Championship Irapuato waited on who would be crowned champions of the next season (Clausura 2002) and it was cross town rivals León.

After winning the Apertura 2002 championship, Irapuato got the chance to play in the promotional final against crosstown rivals (champions of the Clausura 2002), where they won and secured a place in the Mexican First division for the Clausura 2003 season.

His debut in the Mexican First division was on August 3, 2003, in a 1–1 tied game against Morelia during the Clausura 2003 season. After two seasons with Irapuato and one in the first division, Ariel was traded to first division América in December 2003.

=== America ===
"I am very happy to come into an institution like América. It is a great responcibility because América is a team that always needs to be in first place in the league table, and I will try with my best effort to stay on the top"

— Ariel González on his presentation with América, December 10, 2003.

Ariel officially was traded to América on December 10, 2003, for the Clausura 2004 season. He felt the pressure for playing for such an important team like América and playing next to great players such as Cuauhtémoc Blanco, Reinaldo Navia, and Pavel Pardo. he made 15 appearances and 4 goals with América. He reached the playoffs with América but were eliminated in the quarterfinal. Apart with playing in the Mexican League, Ariel participated in the 2004 Copa América with América making 5 appearances in the tournament.

After one season with América Ariel was traded to second division team Real San Luis.

=== Return to San Luis ===
After two seasons in the first division of Mexico Ariel returned to San Luis for the Apertura 2004 season, team where he started his career in Mexico. San Luis won the league title winning the final against Atletico Mexiquense. Thus receiving the opportunity of playing the promotional final against previous Champions, and former team Querétaro where they won in a combined score of 3-2 earning a spot in the Mexican first division. Ariel played a vital role by scoring in the second leg of the matches in the 1st minute of extra time. The game ended in a combined score of 3–2.

During the Clausura 2006 season San Luis received 2nd place in the Championship, losing in the final against Pachuca with a combined score of 0–1.

After 3 seasons with San Luis and 2 seasons in the first division, Ariel was traded to Pumas in December 2006.

=== Pumas ===
Ariel moved to Pumas UNAM in the first division for the Apertura 2006 season, as an important reenforcement. Pumas were placed first in their group ( C ) and qualified for the playoffs where they were defeated in the quarterfinals by Pachuca. During his time in Pumas; Ariel, Esteban Solari, and Ignacio Scocco where an important trio of forwards for Pumas in the Mexican league notably all Argentinians. in His second season with Pumas he made 11 appearances but failed to score a single goal and was placed in the list of transferables, and was eventually loaned to San Luis.

=== Loaned to San Luis ===
Ariel was loaned to San Luis from Pumas as a re-enforcement for the Apertura 2007 season. San Luis reached the quarter-finals before being eliminated by Guadalajara. He managed 11 appearances and scored one goal, against Veracruz on August 29, 2007, in a 2–1 win.

=== Veracruz ===
Pumas eventually traded 33-year-old González to Veracruz for the Clausura 2008 season and Veracruz was eventually relegated to the second division after one season with Ariel Gonzalez. After two poor played seasons with Veracruz, González was loaned to Irapuato for 2 seasons in December 2009.

The Clausura 2008 season was González's last season in the First Division of Mexico. His last game in the Mexican first division was a 0–2 loss against Puebla on April 11, 2008.

=== Return to Irapuato ===
Ariel González was loaned by Veracruz to Irapuato for 2 seasons from the beginning of the Clausura 2009 to the end of the Clausura 2010 (also known as Bicentenario 2010) season. In the Bicentenario 2010 season Ariel won the top goal scorer title with 11 goals. he scored half of Irapuato's goals in that season 11 out of 21 goals, however Irapuato did not reach the playoffs that season. He was sent back from loan to Veracruz but Irapuato decided to transfer Ariel to Irapuato permanently.

Irapuato bought González for the Apertura 2010 season, Ariel led Irapuato to the playoffs eventually losing in the semi-finals against Veracruz 3–2. He received the captain's armband during that season and captained Irapuato until his retirement.

In his second season with Irapuato during the Clausura 2011 season Ariel captained Irapuato to the final against Tijuana, he played an important role by scoring in the semi-final against Atlante UTN and securing the final for Irapuato. He ranked second in the goal scoring table behind Blas Perez with Ariel having 12 goals scored throughout the Clausura 2011 season.

With the championship Irapuato received the chance of playing the promotional final against Tijuana. However, Irapuato lost with a margin of one goal (1–2) and missed out on the opportunity of playing in the Mexican First division.

During the Apertura 2011 season or Ariel's 3rd season with Irapuato, they reached the playoffs but were eliminated by cross town rivals León in the quarterfinals with a combined score of 0–3.

For the Clausura 2012 Ariel and Irapuato and they missed the playoffs.

Again for the Apertura 2012 Irapuato missed out on the playoffs and a 37-year-old Ariel was seen less and less fit.

The Clausura 2013 in the Liga de Ascenso (Second division) was Ariel's last season with Irapuato and the final season played in his professional career.

He made his final appearance with Irapuato on April 20, 2013, against Leones Negros and shortly retired from Professional football after a 19-year career from 1994 to 2013.

== 2014 Return to Irapuato ==
On November 11, 2014, it was announced that Ariel was returning to Irapuato alongside former teammates Gerardo Gómez, and Jorge Manrique as reinforcements for the Clausura 2015 season.

== Honours ==
=== Club ===
Gimnasia

- Primera División:
  - Runner Up (3) : 1995 Clausura, 1996 Clausura, and 1998 Apertura

Irapuato

- Campeón de Ascenso:
  - Champion (1): 2003
  - Runner Up (1) : 2011
- Liga de Ascenso:
  - Champion (2): Apertura 2002, Clausura 2011

San Luis

- Campeón de Ascenso:
  - Champion (1): 2005
- Liga de Ascenso:
  - Champion (1): Apertura 2004
- Primera Division de Mexico:
  - Runner Up (1) : Clausura 2006

=== Individual ===
Goalscoring Leader

- Ascenso MX (4):
- Invierno 2002 with Querétaro
- Apertura 2004 with San Luis
- Apertura 2009 with Irapuato
- Bicentenario 2010 with Irapuato
