= Estadio Altamira =

Stadium in Tamaulipas, Mexico

Coordinates: 22.401764°N 97.910718°W

- Estadio Deportivo Sur de Tamaulipas
- Interactive map of Estadio Altamira
- Location: Altamira, Tamaulipas, Mexico
- Owner: Enrqiue de Hita Yibale
- Operator: Desarrollo Urbano del Puerto Industrial de Altamira
- Capacity: 9,581
- Surface: Grass

Construction
- Groundbreaking: January 2003
- Opened: October 19, 2003

Tenants
- Estudiantes de Altamira (2003-2015); Orgullo Surtam (2026–present)

Estadio Altamira is the current stadium for the team Orgullo Surtam, which plays in the Liga TDP. The stadium, which seats 9,581 people, is located in the port city of Altamira in the state of Tamaulipas.

== History ==
The idea of constructing Estadio Altamira (initially called Estadio Deportivo Sur de Tamaulipas), was the initiative of the founder of the club, Enrique de Hita Yibale. The effort was done as a whole, along with the State and Municipal Authorities; and the Office of Urban Development of the Industrial Port of Altamira. On December 17, 2002, the construction was approved.

The construction began in January 2003, and it was billed as "modern and the only in his type in the whole Mexican Republic". The tribunes and the playing field are of European type, which allows that the sight of a comfortably seated fan should be excellent from any angle of the tribunes. Behind the north goalpost, a forum called "Foro Modelo", is in the shape of half a ball makes it more exclusive.

The stadium was inaugurated on October 19, 2003 during a match between Estudiantes de Altamira and Acapulco FC, corresponding to week 13 of the Apertura 2003 in the Mexican Primera A (now Liga de Ascenso). At the north goalpost, Carlos Alberto Rodríguez scored the first goal in the stadium's history. Altamira would eventually win the match 1-nil.

Probably the biggest game the stadium has hosted was on January 11, 2004, with the visit of Pumas UNAM and their head coach Hugo Sánchez. There was a full house for this pre-season friendly prior to the beginning of the Clausura 2004 tournament. The final score was 5-4 in favor of Pumas.

== Characteristics and services ==
- Capacity: 9,581 spectators
- Type of grass: Bermuda
- Official field measurement: 105 x 68 m.
- Illumination system: 40 lights of 1500 watts
- Electronic scoreboard
- Areas for the teams
- 6 Dressing-rooms: 2 Home, 2 Visitors and 2 Referees
- 30 stadium boxes
- VIP Zone with special balcony
- Press Room
- Bleachers with seats
- Special zone for persons with disabilities
- Restrooms for Men and Women in the General, Preferable, and VIP zones
- 5 storage areas

== Foro Modelo ==
- Capacity: 2,000 spectators
- Shape of half a soccer ball
- Metallic structure
- PVC roof
- 4 dressing rooms
- Restrooms and showers
- Private parking with capacity for 115 cars

== Club Facilities ==
Within the same property as the stadium, the facilities of Estudiantes de Altamira consist of:

- Clubhouse with capacity for 28 players (bedrooms, restrooms, and showers)
- Bedroom for head coach
- Team offices
- Gymnasium and Jacuzzi
- Restrooms
- Natural grass practice field: 105 x 68 m
- Limited practice field
- Practice field to practice headers
- Kitchen and Dining room
- Team store
- Auditorium or classroom
- Medical office
- Dormitory "B" with capacity for 20 players
- 2nd natural grass practice field: 102 x 61 m
- Fronton court
- 7 on 7 soccer court
- Basketball court
