= Efraín Cruz =

Mexican footballer (born 1978)

Efrain Cruz
Personal information
- Full name: Efrain Cruz Gaytán
- Date of birth: 1 November 1978 (age 48)
- Place of birth: Tomatlán, Mexico
- Height: 1.74 m (5 ft 9 in)
- Position: Midfielder

Senior career*
Years	Team	Apps	(Gls)
2002–2003	Tapatío	12	(1)
2003–2004	Guadalajara	1	(0)
2004	Puebla	1	(0)
2004–2006	Tabasco	57	(1)
2006–2007	Tapatío	16	(1)
2007–2008	Tijuana	10	(0)
2008–2012	Irapuato	109	(3)
- * Club domestic league appearances and goals as of 15 October 2012

Efrain Cruz Gaytán (Note: In this Spanish name, the first or paternal surname is Cruz and the second or maternal family name is Gaytán.) (born 1 November 1978), known as Efraín Cruz, is a former Mexican footballer.

== Career ==
The midfielder has been with Ascenso MX side Irapuato FC for several seasons since 2008.

== Honours ==
=== Club ===
Irapuato

- Liga de Ascenso: Clausura 2011
