= Gandhi Vega =

Mexican footballer (born 1977)

Personal information
- Full name: Gandhi Bonerge Vega Arguijo
- Date of birth: 29 April 1977 (age 49)
- Place of birth: Torreón, Mexico
- Height: 1.84 m (6 ft 0 in)
- Position: Defender

Team information
- Current team: Zapotlanejo (manager)

Senior career*
| Years | Team | Apps | (Gls) |
| 1998–2000 | Tecos UAG | 26 | (1) |
| 2000–2001 | Necaxa | 14 | (1) |
| 2001–2002 | León | 8 | (0) |
| 2002–2003 | Tecos UAG | 35 | (1) |
| 2003 | Morelos | 7 | (1) |
| 2004 | Zacatepec | 15 | (2) |
| 2005–2007 | Correcaminos | 48 | (6) |
| 2008–2009 | Durango | 25 | (4) |
| 2009–2011 | Irapuato | 62 | (5) |
| 2012 | Mérida | 15 | (0) |
| 2012 | Cruz Azul Hidalgo | 4 | (0) |
| 2013 | Irapuato | 1 | (0) |

Managerial career
- 2023–2024: UAT Premier
- 2026–: Zapotlanejo
- * Club domestic league appearances and goals as of 4 January 2013

Gandhi Vega (born April 29, 1977) is a former Mexican football defender who last played for Irapuato FC. Since January 2026 is the manager of Liga Premier de México club ACF Zapotlanejo.

== Honours ==
=== Club ===
Irapuato

- Liga de Ascenso:
  - Winners (1): Clausura 2011
