= Leonel Olmedo =

Mexican footballer (born 1981)

Personal information
- Full name: Armando Leonel Olmedo Pérez
- Date of birth: 8 April 1981 (age 45)
- Place of birth: Mexico City, Mexico
- Height: 1.78 m (5 ft 10 in)
- Position: Defender

Senior career*
Years	Team	Apps	(Gls)
2000–2004	América	5	(0)
2002–2003	→ San Luis (loan)	27	(0)
2004–2009	San Luis	107	(1)
2010–2011	Veracruz	24	(0)
2012–2013	Irapuato	7	(0)
2012	→ Queretaro (loan)	2	(0)
2013–2014	Oaxaca	17	(3)
2014–2016	Atlético San Luis	26	(1)

Managerial career
- 2021–2022: Atlético San Luis Reserves and Academy (women)
- * Club domestic league appearances and goals as of 4 January 2013

Armando Leonel Olmedo Pérez (born 8 April 1981) is a Mexican former footballer who last played as a defender for Atlético San Luis.

== Career ==
Although he made his Primera Division debut with his hometown's Club América, Olmedo spent most of his playing career with San Luis F.C. and its replacement club Atlético San Luis. He played for eight seasons over three different spells and is considered a club legend.

After he retired from playing football, Olmedo became a coach. He managed Atlético San Luis (women)'s reserve side before a spell as a caretaker manager of the Liga MX Femenil side in January 2022.
