= Gerardo Gómez (footballer) =

Mexican footballer (born 1989)

Personal information
- Full name: Gerardo Martín Gómez Fonseca
- Date of birth: 11 January 1989 (age 37)
- Place of birth: Irapuato, Guanajuato, Mexico
- Height: 5 ft 4 in (1.63 m)
- Position: Winger

Team information
- Current team: Irapuato
- Number: 27

Youth career
- 2007: Irapuato

Senior career*
Years	Team	Apps	(Gls)
2008–	Irapuato	124	(5)
2011	→ Jaguares de Chiapas Reserves (loan)	12	(1)
- * Club domestic league appearances and goals as of 15 October 2012

Gerardo Martín Gómez Fonseca (born 11 January 1989) is a Mexican professional footballer who currently plays for Irapuato. he is known as Kalu by fans and commentators, he is one of the most capped Irapuato FC players with 124 caps as of 2012.

== Career ==
Gómez was signed by Mexican Primera División side Chiapas, but did not appear for the club and was loaned to Irapuato FC.

== Honours ==
=== Club ===
Irapuato

- Liga de Ascenso: Clausura 2011
- Liga de Ascenso runner up: Apertura 2008, Apertura 2009
