= Gustavo Guillén (footballer) =

Mexican footballer

Personal information
- Full name: Gustavo Guillen Ruiz
- Date of birth: September 24, 1993 (age 33)
- Place of birth: Mexico City, Mexico
- Height: 1.70 m (5 ft 7 in)
- Position: Midfielder

Youth career
- 2011: Puebla Sub-17
- 2011: Irapuato

Senior career*
Years	Team	Apps	(Gls)
2011–2013	Irapuato	30	(5)
2013–2014	BUAP	14	(9)
2014–2015	U. de G.	1	(0)
2016	Tlaxcala	1	(0)
2016–2017	Pioneros de Cancún	28	(1)
2017	Halcones de Morelos	13	(0)
2018–2019	Sporting Canamy	43	(15)
2020	Atlético San Luis Premier	3	(0)
2020	Sporting Canamy	9	(1)
2024	Peluche Caligari	1	(17)
- * Club domestic league appearances and goals as of 28 February 2024

Gustavo Guillén Ruiz known as “Furby” (born September 24, 1991) is a former Mexican footballer who last played as a midfielder for Sporting Canamy.

== Career ==
Guillen made his senior team debut at the age of 17 on September 17, 2011, versus Mérida in a 1–0 win. He scored his first goal with Irapuato's senior team on August 17, 2012, versus Necaxa in a 6–4 loss.

== Club statistics ==
As of 9 November 2012

Club	Season	League		Copa MX		Total	
Club	Season	Apps	Goals	Apps	Goals	Apps	Goals
Irapuato	2011–12	6	0	-	-	6	0
Irapuato	2012–13	13	1	5	0	18	1
Irapuato	Total	18	1	5	0	24	1
