= Luis Alonso Sandoval =

Mexican footballer (born 1981)

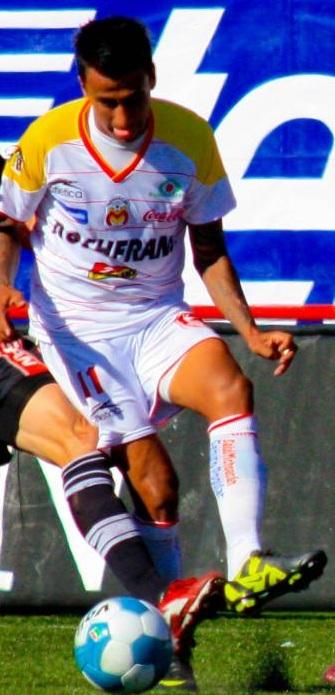
- Sandoval playing for Morelia

Personal information
- Full name: Luis Alonso Sandoval Oliva
- Date of birth: 27 September 1981 (age 45)
- Place of birth: Guadalajara, Mexico
- Height: 1.74 m (5 ft 9 in)
- Position: Winger

Senior career*
Years	Team	Apps	(Gls)
2002–2005	Guadalajara	24	(4)
2005–2006	Jaguares	32	(7)
2006–2007	Veracruz	41	(2)
2008	UAG	35	(3)
2009	→ Monterrey (loan)	14	(1)
2009	→ Morelia (loan)	17	(0)
2010	→ América (loan)	21	(3)
2011–2013	Necaxa	10	(0)
2011–2012	→ Morelia (loan)	35	(3)
2012–2013	→ Atlas (loan)	21	(1)
Total		250	(24)

International career
2005–2006	Mexico	2	(0)
- * Club domestic league appearances and goals

Luis Alonso Sandoval Oliva (born 27 September 1981) is a Mexican former professional footballer.

== Career ==
Sandoval started his professional career with Chivas Guadalajara in 2002, but playing more as a winger, a style he still uses as a striker. He was sold to Jaguares due to Chivas' frequent uprising of young players, but rumored disciplinary trouble. There Sandoval got to play more time, but two seasons later for the Apertura 2006 season, he was traded to Veracruz. In the Clausura 2008 season, he was sold to Tecos UAG, where he so far has been a constant starting player under both former coach Jose Luis Trejo and current coach Miguel Herrera's management. As of December 16, 2008, Sandoval has been sent on loan for 1 year to C.F. Monterrey and signed in July 2009 with Morelia, the club loaned him after four months in late December 2009 to Club América. On the night of April 4, 2010 Sandoval enters during the 2nd half of the Mexican super classic (El Súper Clásico (Mexico)) facing the team that gave birth to his playing career (Chivas Guadalajara). However, the match ended with a 1–0 victory for Guadalajara.

== Personal life ==
In early February 2021, Sandoval was arrested in Illinois for having 1 kilogram (2.2 lb) of cocaine in his vehicle.

He is the father of footballer Santiago Sandoval.

== International appearances ==
As of 1 March 2006

International appearances
#	Date	Venue	Opponent	Result	Competition
1.	14 December 2005	Chase Field, Phoenix, United States	Hungary	2–0	Friendly
2.	1 March 2006	Pizza Hut Park, Frisco, United States	Ghana	1–0	Friendly

== Honours ==
Mexico U23

- CONCACAF Olympic Qualifying Championship: 2004
