= Manuel Corona (footballer) =

Mexican footballer (born 1983)

Personal information
- Full name: Manuel Gerardo Corona Venegas
- Date of birth: 7 January 1983 (age 43)
- Place of birth: Konstanz, Germany
- Position: Goalkeeper

Senior career*
Years	Team	Apps	(Gls)
2005–2006	Salamanca	18	(0)
2006–2008	Santos B	20	(0)
2008–2013	Irapuato	25	(0)

Managerial career
- 2022–2026: Santos Laguna (Goalkeeper coach)
- * Club domestic league appearances and goals as of 15 October 2012

Manuel Gerardo Corona Venegas (born 7 January 1983) is a German born-Mexican former footballer.

He last played as a goalkeeper for Irapuato FC from 2008 to 2013.
