= Walter Jiménez (footballer, born 1977) =

Argentine footballer

Personal information
- Full name: Walter Adrián Jiménez
- Date of birth: 29 August 1977 (age 49)
- Place of birth: Buenos Aires, Argentina
- Height: 1.72 m (5 ft 8 in)
- Position: Midfielder

Senior career*
Years	Team	Apps	(Gls)
1995–1997	El Porvenir		
1997–2000	Platense	48	(9)
2000–2001	Instituto	31	(4)
2001–2003	Banfield	51	(7)
2003–2006	Veracruz	84	(16)
2006	Jaguares	18	(6)
2006–2010	Santos Laguna	138	(23)
2010	→ Gimnasia LP (loan)	9	(0)
2011	→ Puebla (loan)	17	(0)
2012–2013	Club Irapuato	15	(2)
2014	Correcaminos UAT		
- * Club domestic league appearances and goals

Walter Adrián Jiménez (born 29 August 1977 in Buenos Aires) is an Argentine former professional footballer.

His nickname is Lorito which means Parrot.

== Career ==
Jiménez joined Santos Laguna in 2006, becoming a stalwart of the side. In May 2010, he was loaned to an Argentine club for six months after Santos had filled all of its available foreign player slots for the upcoming tournament.

Jiménez signed for Ascenso MX side Irapuato in July 2012.

== Personal life ==
Jiménez is the father of Santos Laguna player Tahiel.

== Honours ==
=== Club ===
Santos Laguna

- Primera División de México - Clausura 2008
