= 2014–15 Puebla F.C. season =

Puebla F.C.
2014–15 season
- Chairman: Jesus Lopez Charagoy
- Manager: Ruben Omar Romano (from August 14, 2013)
- Stadium: Estadio Cuauhtémoc
- Copa MX (Apertura): Runner - Up
- Copa MX (Clausura): Champions (5th cup)
- Top goalscorer: Apertura: Clausura:
| Home colours | Away colours | Third colours |

The 2014–15 Puebla season was the 68th professional season of Mexico's top-flight football league. The season is split into two tournaments—the Torneo Apertura and the Torneo Clausura—each with identical formats and each contested by the same eighteen teams. Puebla began their season on July 17, 2014 against Club Tijuana, Puebla plays their homes games on Saturdays at 17:00pm local time.

== Torneo Apertura 2014 ==
List of Mexican football transfers summer 2014 current squad Clausura 2014

Note: Flags indicate national team as defined under FIFA eligibility rules; some limited exceptions apply. Players may hold more than one non-FIFA nationality.

| No. | Pos. | Nation | Player |
|---|---|---|---|
| 1 | GK | MEX | Alfredo Frausto (on loan from Chiapas) |
| 2 | DF | COL | Efraín Cortés (on loan from Pachuca) |
| 3 | DF | MEX | Juan Carlos de la Barrera |
| 4 | DF | MEX | Uriel Álvarez (on loan from Santos Laguna) |
| 5 | DF | MEX | Mario de Luna (on loan from Guadalajara) |
| 6 | MF | MEX | Édgar Mejía (on loan from Guadalajara) |
| 7 | MF | MEX | Luis Miguel Noriega (on loan from Querétaro) |
| 8 | MF | MEX | Gerardo Espinoza (on loan from Querétaro) |
| 9 | FW | ECU | Marlon de Jesús (on loan from Monterrey) |
| 10 | MF | MEX | Cuauhtémoc Blanco |
| 11 | FW | MEX | Juan Carlos Cacho (on loan from UNAM) |
| 12 | DF | MEX | Óscar Rojas (on loan from América) |
| 13 | MF | MEX | Alfonso Tamay (on loan from UANL) |
| 14 | FW | MEX | Luis Loroña (on loan from Querétaro) |

| No. | Pos. | Nation | Player |
|---|---|---|---|
| 15 | MF | MEX | Francisco Acuña (on loan from UANL) |
| 16 | DF | USA | Michael Orozco (on loan from Chiapas) |
| 17 | MF | MEX | Saúl Villalobos (on loan from Atlas) |
| 18 | DF | MEX | Luis Ricardo Esqueda (on loan from Querétaro) |
| 19 | FW | MEX | Flavio Santos (on loan from Atlas) |
| 20 | MF | COL | Eisner Loboa |
| 22 | MF | COL | John Pajoy (on loan from Pachuca) |
| 24 | MF | MEX | Eduardo Arce |
| 25 | MF | MEX | Pablo González |
| 26 | DF | ARG | Mauricio Romero (on loan from Morelia) |
| 27 | MF | MEX | Alberto Acosta (on loan from UANL) |
| 28 | MF | MEX | Francisco Torres (on loan from Santos Laguna) |
| 29 | FW | COL | Wilberto Cosme (on loan from Querétaro) |
| 30 | GK | MEX | Rodolfo Cota (on loan from Pachuca) |

For recent transfers, see List of Mexican football transfers winter 2013–14.

=== Regular season ===
Win Draw Loss

==== Apertura 2014 results ====
| July 18, 2014 Round 1 | Club Tijuana | 0–1 | Puebla | Tijuana, Baja California |
| 21:30 | | | | Stadium: Estadio Caliente |

| July 26, 2014 Round 2 | Puebla | 0–0 | Veracruz | Puebla, Puebla |
| 12:00 | de Jesús (yellow card) 45'; Torres (yellow card) 51'; Blanco (yellow card) 77' | Report | Luis Alberto Sánchez (yellow card) 68'; Cortés (yellow card) 71' | Stadium: Estadio Cuauhtémoc; Referee: (Mexico) José Alfredo Peñaloza Soto |

| August 2, 2014 Round 3 | Puebla | 0 - 4 | Club America | Puebla, Puebla |
| 17:00 | Álvarez (yellow card) 9'; Romero (yellow card) 60'; Rojas (yellow card) 60'; Esqueda (yellow card) 84' | Summary | Goltz (yellow card) 3' (yellow-red card); Jiménez 15' 62' (pen.) 75'; Layún (yellow card) 30'; Peralta 73'; Arroyo (yellow card) 74' | Stadium: Estadio Cuauhtémoc; Referee: (Mexico) Jorge Pérez Durán |

| August 9, 2014 Round 4 | Cruz Azul | 1–0 | Puebla | Benito Juárez, Mexico City |
| 17:00 | Orozco 31' (o.g.); Bernardello (yellow card) 68'; Giménez (yellow card) 90+1' | Report | Orozco (red card) 59' | Stadium: Estadio Azul; Referee: (Mexico) Miguel Chacon |

| August 16, 2014 Round 5 | Puebla | 1–1 | Tigres UANL | Puebla, Puebla |
| 21:30 | Santos 59' | Summary | Torres Nilo (yellow card) 62'; Guerrón 65' | Stadium: Estadio Cuauhtémoc; Referee: (Mexico) Miguel Flores |

| August 23, 2014 Round 6 | Monterrey | 1–0 | Puebla | Monterrey, Nuevo Leon |
| 19:00 | | | | Stadium: Estadio Tecnológico |

| August 30, 2014 Round 7 | Puebla | 3–2 | Morelia | Puebla, Puebla |
| 17:00 | | | | Stadium: Estadio Cuauhtémoc |

| September 12, 2014 Round 8 | Querétaro | 1–1 | Puebla | Querétaro, Querétaro |
| 19:30 | | | | Stadium: Estadio Corregidora |

| September 20, 2014 Round 9 | Puebla | 1–1 | Chiapas | Puebla, Puebla |
| 17:00 | | | | Stadium: Estadio Cuauhtémoc |

| September 28, 2014 Round 10 | Guadalajara | 0–0 | Puebla | Zapopan, Jalisco |
| 19:00 | | | | Stadium: Estadio Omnilife |

| October 1, 2014 Round 11 | Puebla | 1–2 | UNAM | Puebla, Puebla |
| 19:00 | [ | | | Stadium: Estadio Cuauhtémoc |

| October 5, 2014 Round 12 | Toluca | 1–1 | Puebla | Toluca, Estado de Mexico |
| 12:00 | | | | Stadium: Estadio Cuauhtémoc |

| October 18, 2014 Round 13 | Puebla | 0–0 | Leones Negros | Puebla, Puebla |
| 17:00 | | | | Stadium: Estadio Cuauhtémoc |

| October 25, 2014 Round 14 | Club Atlas | 2–1 | Puebla | Guadalajara, Jalisco, Mexico |
| 21:00 | | | | Stadium: Jalisco |

| November 1, 2014 Round 15 | Puebla | 1–1 | Pachuca | Puebla, Puebla |
| 17:00 | | Report | | Stadium: Estadio Cuauhtémoc |

| November 8, 2014 Round 16 | Club Leon | 1–1 | Puebla | Guanajuato, Leon |
| 20:06 | | | | Stadium: Cam Nou |

| November 22, 2013 Round 17 | Puebla | 3–3 | Santos Laguna | Puebla, Puebla |
| 17:00 | | | | Stadium: Estadio Cuauhtémoc |

=== Goalscorers ===
| Position | Nation | Name | Goals scored |
|---|---|---|---|
| 1. | (Mexico) | Luis Miguel Noriega | 4 |
| 2. | (Colombia) | Wilberto Cosme | 3 |
| 2. | (Mexico) | Cuauhtémoc Blanco | 3 |
| 3. | (Colombia) | John Pajoy | 2 |
| 4. | (Mexico) | Luis Loroña | 1 |
| 4. | (Mexico) | Francisco Acuña | 1 |
| 4. | (Mexico) | Flavio Santos | 1 |

=== Results ===
==== Results summary ====
| Overall | | | | | | | | Home | | | | | | Away | | | | | |
| Pld | W | D | L | GF | GA | GD | Pts | W | D | L | GF | GA | GD | W | D | L | GF | GA | GD |
|---|---|---|---|---|---|---|---|---|---|---|---|---|---|---|---|---|---|---|---|
| 16 | 2 | 10 | 4 | 15 | 21 | −6 | 16 | 1 | 6 | 2 | 10 | 14 | −4 | 1 | 4 | 2 | 5 | 7 | −2 |

Last updated: 16 August 2014.
Source: Apertura 2014 results

==== Results by round ====
| Round | 1 | 2 | 3 | 4 | 5 | 6 | 7 | 8 | 9 | 10 | 11 | 12 | 13 | 14 | 15 | 16 | 17 |
|---|---|---|---|---|---|---|---|---|---|---|---|---|---|---|---|---|---|
| Ground | A | H | H | A | H | A | H | H | A | H | A | H | A | H | A | H | A |
| Result | W | D | L | L | D | L | W | D | D | D | L | D | D | L | D | D | D |
| Position | 3 | 5 | 10 | 13 | 14 | 15 | 11 | 12 | 12 | 12 | 14 | 14 | 15 | 15 | 15 | 15 | 15 |

Updated to match(es) played on 16 August 2014. Source: Apertura 2014 results and mediotiempo.com
A = Away; H = Home; W = Win; D = Draw; L = Loss

== Apertura 2014 Copa MX ==
=== Group stage ===
Win Draw Loss

==== Apertura results ====
| July 30, 2014 1 | Club Celaya | 0–1 | Puebla | Celaya, Guanajuato |
| 21:00 | | | | Stadium: Estadio Miguel Aleman |

| August 6, 2014 2 | Puebla | 2–0 | Club Celaya | Puebla, Puebla |
| 21:00 | | | | Stadium: Estadio Cuauhtémoc |

| August 20, 2014 3 | Puebla | 1–0 | Necaxa | Puebla, Puebla |
| 19:00 | | | | Stadium: Estadio Cuauhtémoc |

| August 26, 2013 4 | Necaxa | 0–0 | Puebla | Aguascalientes, Aguascalientes |
| 19:00 | | | | Stadium: Estadio Victoria |

| September 16, 2014 5 | Puebla | 2–1 | Morelia | Puebla, Puebla |
| 19:00 | | | | Stadium: Estadio Cuauhtémoc |

| September 24, 2013 6 | Morelia | 3–0 | Puebla | Morelia, Michoacán |
| 19:00 | | | | Stadium: Estadio Morelos |

=== Quarterfinals ===
Win Draw Loss

==== Apertura results ====
| October 22, 2014 Quarterfinals | Club Atlas | (3)0–0(4) | Puebla | Guadalajara, Jalisco |
| 19:00 | | | | Stadium: Estadio Jalisco |

=== Semifinals ===
Win Draw Loss

==== Apertura results ====
| October 28, 2014 Semifinals | Puebla | (5)1–1(4) | Lobos de la BUAP | Puebla, Puebla |
| 19:00 | | | | Stadium: Estadio Cuauhtémoc |

=== final ===
Win Draw Loss

==== Apertura results ====
| Final | Santos Laguna | (2)2–2 (4) | Puebla | Torreón, Coahuila |
| | | | | Stadium: Estadio Corona |

=== Goalscorers ===
| Position | Nation | Name | Goals scored |
|---|---|---|---|
| 1. | (Mexico) | Eduardo Pérez Reyes | 1 |
| 2. | (Mexico) | Luis Loroña | 1 |
| 3. | (Mexico) | Juan Carlos Cacho | 1 |
| 4. | (Mexico) | Édgar Mejía | 1 |
| 5. | (Mexico) | Cuauhtémoc Blanco | 1 |
| 6. | (Mexico) | Luis Loroña | 1 |
| TOTAL | | | 7 |

=== Results ===
==== Results by round ====
| Round | 1 | 2 | 3 | 4 | 5 | 6 |
|---|---|---|---|---|---|---|
| Ground | A | H | H | A | H | A |
| Result | W | W | W | D | W | L |
| Position | 1 | 1 | 1 | 1 | 1 | 1 |

Updated to match(es) played on 2 June 2014. Source: Apertura results and mediotiempo.com
A = Away; H = Home; W = Win; D = Draw; L = Loss

== Torneo Clausura 2015 ==
=== Regular season ===
Win Draw Loss

==== Clausura 2015 results ====
| January 10, 2015 Round 1 | Puebla | 2–1 | Club Tijuana | Puebla, Puebla |
| 17:00 | | | | Stadium: Estadio Cuauhtémoc |

| January 16, 2015 Round 2 | Veracruz | 3–1 | Puebla | Veracruz, Veracruz |
| 20:30 | | | | Stadium: Estadio Luis Pirata Fuente |

| January 24, 2015 Round 3 | Club America | 0 - 0 | Puebla | Mexico City |
| 17:00 | | | | Stadium: Estadio Azteca |

| January 31, 2015 Round 4 | Puebla | 0–0 | Cruz Azul | Puebla, Puebla |
| 17:00 | | | | Stadium: Estadio Cuauhtémoc |

| February 7, 2015 Round 5 | Tigres UANL | 1–0 | Puebla | San Nicolás de los Garza, Nuevo León |
| 19:00 | | | | Stadium: Estadio Universitario |

| February 14, 2015 Round 6 | Puebla | 2–0 | Monterrey | Puebla, Puebla |
| 17:00 | | | | Stadium: Estadio Cuauhtémoc |

| February 20, 2015 Round 7 | Morelia | 1–2 | Puebla | Morelia, Michoacán |
| 19:30 | | | | Stadium: Estadio Morelos |

| February 28, 2015 Round 8 | Puebla | 4–1 | Querétaro | Puebla, Puebla |
| 17:00 | | | | Stadium: Estadio Cuauhtémoc |

| March 7, 2015 Round 9 | Chiapas | 2–2 | Puebla | Tuxtla Gutiérrez, Chiapas |
| 21:00 | | | | Stadium: Estadio Víctor Manuel Reyna |

| March 14, 2015 Round 10 | Puebla | 1–2 | Guadalajara | Puebla, Puebla |
| 17:00 | | | | Stadium: Estadio Cuauhtémoc |

| March 22, 2015 Round 11 | UNAM | 2–1 | Puebla | Ciudad Universitaria, México City |
| 12:00 | | | | Stadium: Estadio Olímpico Universitario |

| April 4, 2014 Round 12 | Puebla | 0–1 | Toluca | Puebla, Puebla |
| 17:00 | | | | Stadium: Estadio Cuauhtémoc |

| April 12, 2014 Round 13 | Leones Negros | 1–1 | Puebla | Guadalajara, Jalisco |
| 17:00 | | | | Stadium: Estadio Jalisco |

| April 18, 2014 Round 14 | Puebla | 0–1 | Club Atlas | Puebla, Puebla |
| 17:00 | | | | Stadium: Estadio Cuauhtémoc |

| April 25, 2014 Round 15 | Pachuca | 2–1 | Puebla | Pachuca, Hidalgo |
| 20:06 | | Report | | Stadium: Estadio Cuauhtémoc |

| May 2, 2015 Round 16 | Puebla | 2–0 | Club Leon | Puebla, Puebla |
| 17:00 | | | | Stadium: Estadio Cuauhtémoc |

| May 8, 2015 Round 17 | Santos Laguna | 0–0 | Puebla | Torreón, Coahuila |
| 21:30 | | | | Stadium: Estadio Corona TSM |

=== Goalscorers ===
| Position | Nation | Name | Goals scored |
|---|---|---|---|
| 1. | (Argentina) | Matías Alustiza | 9 |
| 2. | (Mexico) (Colombia) | Luis Gabriel Rey | 3 |
| 3. | (Argentina) | Facundo Erpen | 2 |
| 3. | (Mexico) | Luis Miguel Noriega | 2 |
| 4. | (Mexico) (United States) | Hercules Gomez | 1 |
| 4. | (Mexico) | Flavio Santos | 1 |
| 4. | (Colombia) | John Pajoy | 1 |

==== Results summary ====
| Overall | | | | | | | | Home | | | | | | Away | | | | | |
| Pld | W | D | L | GF | GA | GD | Pts | W | D | L | GF | GA | GD | W | D | L | GF | GA | GD |
|---|---|---|---|---|---|---|---|---|---|---|---|---|---|---|---|---|---|---|---|
| 16 | 5 | 4 | 7 | 19 | 18 | +1 | 19 | 4 | 1 | 3 | 11 | 6 | +5 | 1 | 3 | 4 | 8 | 12 | −4 |

Last updated: 16 August 2014.
Source: Apertura 2014 results

==== Results by round ====
| Round | 1 | 2 | 3 | 4 | 5 | 6 | 7 | 8 | 9 | 10 | 11 | 12 | 13 | 14 | 15 | 16 | 17 |
|---|---|---|---|---|---|---|---|---|---|---|---|---|---|---|---|---|---|
| Ground | H | A | H | A | A | H | A | H | A | H | A | H | A | H | A | H | A |
| Result | W | L | D | D | L | W | W | W | D | L | L | L | D | L | L | W | |
| Position | 1 | 12 | 12 | 11 | 14 | 10 | 6 | 4 | 4 | 7 | 8 | 12 | 14 | 15 | 15 | 15 | |

Updated to match(es) played on 16 January 2015. Source: #Clausura 2015 results and mediotiempo.com
A = Away; H = Home; W = Win; D = Draw; L = Loss

== Clausura 2015 Copa MX ==
=== Group stage ===
Win Draw Loss

==== Apertura results ====
| January 20, 2015 1 | Puebla | 2–0 | Atlante F.C. | Puebla, Puebla |
| 19:00 | | | | Stadium: Estadio Universitario BUAP |

| January 27, 2014 2 | Atlante F.C. | 1–1 | Puebla | Cancún, Quintana Roo |
| 21:00 | | | | Stadium: Estadio Andrés Quintana Roo |

| February 3, 2014 3 | Puebla | 2–1 | Merida | Puebla, Puebla |
| 19:00 | | | | Stadium: Estadio Universitario BUAP |

| February 17, 2015 4 | Merida | 0–2 | Puebla | Merida, Yucatan |
| 19:00 | | | | Stadium: Estadio Carlos Iturralde |

| February 24, 2015 5 | Toluca F.C. | 4–3 | Puebla | Toluca, State of Mexico |
| 19:00 | | | | Stadium: Nemesio Díez |

| March 4, 2015 6 | Puebla | 1–0 | Toluca F.C. | Puebla, Puebla |
| 19:00 | | | | Stadium: Estadio Universitario BUAP |

=== Quarterfinals ===
Win Draw Loss

==== Apertura results ====
| March 10, 2015 Quarterfinals | Puebla | 2–1 | Merida | Puebla, Puebla |
| 17:00 | | | | Stadium: Estadio Universitario BUAP |

=== Semifinals ===
Win Draw Loss

==== Apertura results ====
| April 7, 2015 Quarterfinals | Puebla | 3–0 | Monterrey | Puebla, Puebla |
| 19:00 | | | | Stadium: Estadio Universitario BUAP |

=== Final ===
21 April 2015
20:00

| Puebla | 4–2 | Guadalajara |
|---|---|---|
| Erpen 6'; Rey 25'; Alustiza 59' (pen.), 67' | Report | de Nigris 54', 55' |

Estadio Universitario BUAP, Puebla, Puebla
Referee: Luis Enrique Santander

| Puebla | Guadalajara |

| GK | 1 | (Mexico) Fabián Villaseñor |
| DF | 4 | (Argentina) Facundo Erpen |
| DF | 24 | (Mexico) Sergio Pérez | | (substituted off) 62' |
| DF | 12 | (Mexico) Óscar Rojas |
| DF | 16 | (United States) Michael Orozco | (yellow card) 12' |
| MF | 28 | (Mexico) Francisco Torres | (yellow card) 64' |
| MF | 7 | (Mexico) Luis Miguel Noriega (c) |
| MF | 19 | (Mexico) Flavio Santos | | (substituted off) 63' |
| FW | 21 | (Colombia) Luis Gabriel Rey |
| FW | 13 | (Mexico) Alfonso Tamay |
| FW | 11 | (Argentina) Matías Alustiza | | (substituted off) 69' |
Substitutions:
| GK | 30 | (Mexico) Rodolfo Cota |
| DF | 5 | (Mexico) Mario de Luna | | (substituted on) 63' |
| MF | 8 | (Mexico) Gerardo Espinoza |
| MF | 10 | (Mexico) Cuauhtémoc Blanco | | (substituted on) 69' |
| MF | 22 | (Colombia) John Pajoy | | (substituted on) 62' |
| FW | 9 | (United States) Hérculez Gómez |
| FW | 29 | (Colombia) Wilberto Cosme |
Manager:
(Mexico) José Guadalupe Cruz

| GK | 1 | (Mexico) José Antonio Rodríguez |
| DF | 2 | (Mexico) Néstor Vidrio | (yellow card) 38' | (substituted off) 68' |
| DF | 16 | (Mexico) Miguel Ángel Ponce | | (substituted off) 69' |
| DF | 3 | (Mexico) Kristian Álvarez |
| DF | 27 | (Mexico) Hedgardo Marín | (red card) 87' |
| MF | 15 | (Mexico) Fernando Arce (c) |
| MF | 5 | (Mexico) Patricio Araujo |
| MF | 19 | (Mexico) David Toledo | | (substituted off) 52' |
| MF | 28 | (Mexico) Giovanni Hernández |
| FW | 11 | (Mexico) Aldo de Nigris |
| FW | 31 | (Mexico) Erick Torres |
Substitutions:
| GK | 29 | (Mexico) Luis Ernesto Michel |
| DF | 13 | (Mexico) Carlos Salcedo |
| MF | 14 | (Mexico) Jorge Enríquez |
| MF | 17 | (Mexico) Jesús Sánchez | | (substituted on) 48' |
| MF | 33 | (Mexico) Marco Fabián | | (substituted on) 52' |
| FW | 9 | (Mexico) Omar Bravo |
| FW | 21 | (Mexico) Carlos Fierro | | (substituted on) 69' |
Manager:
(Mexico) José Manuel de la Torre

Assistant referees:
Marvin Torrentera
Telly Saldivar
Fourth official:
Roberto Rios Jácome

=== Goalscorers ===
| Position | Nation | Name | Goals scored |
|---|---|---|---|
| 1. | (Mexico) (United States) | Hercules Gomez | 5 |
| 2. | (Mexico) | Cuauhtémoc Blanco | 4 |
| 3. | (Argentina) | Matías Alustiza | 2 |
| 4. | (Colombia) | Wilberto Cosme | 2 |
| 4. | (Mexico) | Alfonso Tamay | 1 |
| 4. | (Colombia) | Eisner Loboa | 1 |
| 4. | (Mexico) | Sergio Pérez Moya | 1 |
| 4. | (Mexico) | Luis Enrique Robles | 1 |
| 4. | (Argentina) | Facundo Erpen | 1 |
| 4. | (Mexico) (Colombia) | Luis Gabriel Rey | 1 |
| TOTAL | | | 19 |

=== Results ===
==== Results by round ====
| Round | 1 | 2 | 3 | 4 | 5 | 6 |
|---|---|---|---|---|---|---|
| Ground | H | A | H | A | H | A |
| Result | W | D | W | W | L | W |
| Position | 2 | 2 | 1 | 1 | 1 | 1 |

Updated to match(es) played on January 2015. Source: Apertura results and mediotiempo.com
A = Away; H = Home; W = Win; D = Draw; L = Loss
