= Clausura 2015 Copa MX final =

- Event: Clausura 2015 Copa MX
Puebla	Guadalajara
4	2
- Date: April 21, 2015
- Venue: Estadio Universitario BUAP, Puebla, Puebla
- Referee: Luis Enrique Santander

The Clausura 2015 Copa MX final was the final of the Clausura 2015 Copa MX, the sixth edition of the Copa MX under its current format and 73rd overall organized by the Mexican Football Federation, the governing body of association football in Mexico.

The final was contested in a single leg format between Liga MX clubs, Puebla and Guadalajara. The leg was hosted by Puebla at their temporary home at Estadio Universitario BUAP in Puebla, Puebla on April 21, 2015. The winner earned a spot to face Santos Laguna (the winner of the Apertura edition) in the 2015 Supercopa MX to qualify as Mexico 3 to the 2016 Copa Libertadores.

== Venue ==
Due to the tournament's regulations the higher seed among both finalists during the group stage would host the final, thus Estadio Universitario BUAP (Puebla's temporary home) hosted the final.

== Background ==
Before the final, Puebla had won the tournament four times, while Guadalajara has won it twice. Before reaching this final, the last time Guadalajara reached a final of any kind was the 2010 Copa Libertadores Finals where they lost to Internacional of Brazil 5–3 on aggregate. Puebla on the other hand reached the finals of the most recent edition of Copa MX, losing 4–2 on penalties to Santos Laguna following a 2–2 draw.

Puebla won four, drew one and lost one group stage match and scored 11 goals during group stage, as they were seeded second. They eliminated Mérida in the quarterfinals and Monterrey in the semifinals.

Guadalajara won four, drew one and lost one group stage match and scored seven goals, as they were seeded fifth, they eliminated Querétaro on penalty kicks in the quarterfinals and Chiapas in the semifinals.

== Road to the finals ==
Note: In all results below, the score of the finalist is given first.

Puebla		Round	Guadalajara	
Opponent	Result	Group stage	Opponent	Result
Atlante	2–0 (H)	Matchday 1	Sinaloa	2–2 (H)
Atlante	1–1 (A)	Matchday 2	Sinaloa	0–1 (A)
Mérida	2–1 (H)	Matchday 3	BUAP	2–0 (H)
Mérida	2–0 (A)	Matchday 4	BUAP	1–0 (A)
Toluca	3–4 (A)	Matchday 5	Irapuato	1–0 (A)
Toluca	1–0 (H)	Matchday 6	Irapuato	1–0 (H)
Group 5 winner: Pos / Team / Pld / Pts; 1 / Puebla / 6 / 16; 2 / Mérida / 6 / 14; 3 / Toluca / 6 / 8; 4 / Atlante / 6 / 2; Updated to match(es) played on unknown. Source:		Final standings	Group 4 winner: Pos / Team / Pld / Pts; 1 / Guadalajara / 6 / 15; 2 / Sinaloa / 6 / 13; 3 / BUAP / 6 / 7; 4 / Irapuato / 6 / 4; Updated to match(es) played on unknown. Source:	
Opponent	Result	Knockout stage	Opponent	Result
Mérida	2–1 (H)	Quarterfinals	Querétaro	0–0 (4–3) (A)
Monterrey	3–0 (H)	Semifinals	Chiapas	2–1 (H)

== Match ==
21 April 2015
20:00

Puebla	4–2	Guadalajara
Erpen 6'; Rey 25'; Alustiza 59' (pen.), 67'	Report	de Nigris 54', 55'

Estadio Universitario BUAP, Puebla, Puebla
Referee: Luis Enrique Santander

Puebla	Guadalajara

GK	1	(Mexico) Fabián Villaseñor
DF	4	(Argentina) Facundo Erpen
DF	24	(Mexico) Sergio Pérez		(substituted off) 62'
DF	12	(Mexico) Óscar Rojas
DF	16	(United States) Michael Orozco	(yellow card) 12'
MF	28	(Mexico) Francisco Torres	(yellow card) 64'
MF	7	(Mexico) Luis Miguel Noriega (c)
MF	19	(Mexico) Flavio Santos		(substituted off) 63'
FW	21	(Colombia) Luis Gabriel Rey
FW	13	(Mexico) Alfonso Tamay
FW	11	(Argentina) Matías Alustiza		(substituted off) 69'
Substitutions:
GK	30	(Mexico) Rodolfo Cota
DF	5	(Mexico) Mario de Luna		(substituted on) 63'
MF	8	(Mexico) Gerardo Espinoza
MF	10	(Mexico) Cuauhtémoc Blanco		(substituted on) 69'
MF	22	(Colombia) John Pajoy		(substituted on) 62'
FW	9	(United States) Hérculez Gómez
FW	29	(Colombia) Wilberto Cosme
Manager:
(Mexico) José Guadalupe Cruz

GK	1	(Mexico) José Antonio Rodríguez
DF	2	(Mexico) Néstor Vidrio	(yellow card) 38'	(substituted off) 68'
DF	16	(Mexico) Miguel Ángel Ponce		(substituted off) 69'
DF	3	(Mexico) Kristian Álvarez
DF	27	(Mexico) Hedgardo Marín	(red card) 87'
MF	15	(Mexico) Fernando Arce (c)
MF	5	(Mexico) Patricio Araujo
MF	19	(Mexico) David Toledo		(substituted off) 52'
MF	28	(Mexico) Giovanni Hernández
FW	11	(Mexico) Aldo de Nigris
FW	31	(Mexico) Erick Torres
Substitutions:
GK	29	(Mexico) Luis Ernesto Michel
DF	13	(Mexico) Carlos Salcedo
MF	14	(Mexico) Jorge Enríquez
MF	17	(Mexico) Jesús Sánchez		(substituted on) 48'
MF	33	(Mexico) Marco Fabián		(substituted on) 52'
FW	9	(Mexico) Omar Bravo
FW	21	(Mexico) Carlos Fierro		(substituted on) 69'
Manager:
(Mexico) José Manuel de la Torre

Assistant referees:
Marvin Torrentera
Telly Saldivar
Fourth official:
Roberto Rios Jácome
