= List of Mexican football transfers summer 2014 =

This is a list of Mexican football transfers in the Mexican Primera Division during the summer 2014 transfer window, grouped by club. It only includes football transfers related to clubs from Liga MX, the first division of Mexican football.

== Mexican Primera Division ==
=== América ===
In: Note: Flags indicate national team as defined under FIFA eligibility rules; some limited exceptions apply. Players may hold more than one non-FIFA nationality.

No.	Pos.	Nation	Player
17	DF	MEX	Ventura Alvarado (loan return from Necaxa)
81	DF	MEX	Gil Burón (loan return from Querétaro)
—	DF	ARG	Paolo Goltz (from (Argentina) Lanús)
—	DF	MEX	José Daniel Guerrero (from Atlante)
—	DF	MEX	Osmar Mares (on loan from Santos Laguna)
—	MF	ARG	Gonzalo Díaz (on loan from (Argentina) Godoy Cruz)
—	MF	MEX	Moisés Velasco (on loan from Toluca, previously on loan at Querétaro)
—	FW	ECU	Michael Arroyo (on loan from Atlante)
—	FW	MEX	José Madueña (on loan from Tijuana, previously on loan at Sinaloa)
—	FW	MEX	Oribe Peralta (from Santos Laguna)
—	FW	MEX	Martín Eduardo Zúñiga (loan return from Chiapas)

Out: Note: Flags indicate national team as defined under FIFA eligibility rules; some limited exceptions apply. Players may hold more than one non-FIFA nationality.

No.	Pos.	Nation	Player
2	DF	MEX	Francisco Javier Rodríguez (to Cruz Azul)
3	DF	COL	Aquivaldo Mosquera (to Pachuca)
7	FW	ARG	Andrés Ríos (on loan to UDG)
8	MF	COL	Andrés Andrade (on loan to Chiapas)
9	FW	MEX	Raúl Jiménez (to (Spain) Atlético Madrid)
12	GK	MEX	Carlos López Rubio (on loan to Morelia)
16	DF	MEX	Adrián Aldrete (to Santos Laguna)
17	FW	MEX	Antonio López (on loan to Zacatecas)
20	MF	MEX	Gil Cordero (on loan to Atlante)
26	MF	MEX	Juan Carlos Medina (to Atlas)
25	MF	MEX	Carlos Gutiérrez (on loan to Zacatecas)
30	MF	MEX	Omar Govea (on loan to Zacatecas)
––	MF	MEX	Christian Bermúdez (to Chiapas, previously on loan at Querétaro)

=== Atlas ===
In: Note: Flags indicate national team as defined under FIFA eligibility rules; some limited exceptions apply. Players may hold more than one non-FIFA nationality.

No.	Pos.	Nation	Player
—	GK	MEX	Miguel Ángel Fraga (from Querétaro)
—	DF	USA	Édgar Castillo (from Tijuana)
—	FW	MEX	Jesús Roberto Chávez (on loan from Puebla)
—	DF	MEX	Luis Venegas (from Atlante)
—	MF	MEX	Edy Germán Brambila (on loan from Toluca)
—	MF	MEX	Juan de Dios Hernández (from Tijuana, previously on loan at Sinaloa)
—	MF	MEX	Pablo Mascareñas (from Altamira)
—	MF	MEX	Juan Carlos Medina (from América)
—	MF	COL	Aldo Leao Ramírez (from Morelia)
—	MF	MEX	Rodolfo Vilchis (from Querétaro)
—	FW	PAR	Luis Nery Caballero (from (Russia) Krylia Sovetov Samara)
—	FW	MEX	Enrique Esqueda (on loan from Pachuca)

Out: Note: Flags indicate national team as defined under FIFA eligibility rules; some limited exceptions apply. Players may hold more than one non-FIFA nationality.

No.	Pos.	Nation	Player
4	DF	MEX	Antonio Briseño (to UANL)
8	MF	MEX	Jorge Gastélum (loan return to Querétaro)
9	FW	PAR	José Ortigoza (to (Paraguay) Cerro Porteño)
13	DF	MEX	Gregorio Torres (on loan to UAT)
22	MF	MEX	Ricardo Bocanegra (on loan to Irapuato)
23	MF	MEX	Juan Pablo Vigón (on loan to Atlético San Luis)
25	DF	ARG	Leandro Cufré (on loan to UDG)
26	FW	MEX	Flavio Santos (on loan to Puebla)
27	FW	MEX	Christian Díaz (on loan to UDG)
30	FW	MEX	Vicente Matías Vuoso (on loan to Chiapas)
––	MF	MEX	Diego Campos (to UDG, previously on loan at Estudiantes Tecos)
––	MF	MEX	Efrén Mendoza (to UDG, previously on loan)
––	MF	MEX	Luis Manuel Ramos (on loan to Irapuato)
––	MF	MEX	Saúl Villalobos (on loan to Puebla, previously on loan)

=== Chiapas ===
In: Note: Flags indicate national team as defined under FIFA eligibility rules; some limited exceptions apply. Players may hold more than one non-FIFA nationality.

No.	Pos.	Nation	Player
—	DF	MEX	Horacio Cervantes (on loan from Cruz Azul)
—	DF	MEX	Édgar Dueñas (on loan from Toluca)
—	DF	MEX	Eloy González (on loan from BUAP)
—	DF	MEX	Sergio Pérez Moya (on loan from Querétaro, previously on loan at Atlante)
—	MF	COL	Andrés Andrade (on loan from América)
—	MF	ARG	Emiliano Armenteros (from (Spain) Osasuna)
—	MF	MEX	Christian Bermúdez (from América, previously on loan at Querétaro)
—	MF	MEX	Diego de la Torre (from Querétaro)
—	MF	MEX	Alberto Medina (on loan from Puebla)
—	MF	MEX	Alan Zamora (on loan from Querétaro, previously on loan at Puebla)
—	FW	COL	Franco Arizala (on loan from León)
—	FW	CHI	Isaac Díaz (on loan from Universidad de Chile)
—	FW	MEX	Adrián Marín Lugo (loan return from BUAP)
—	FW	MEX	Vicente Matías Vuoso (on loan from Atlas)

Out: Note: Flags indicate national team as defined under FIFA eligibility rules; some limited exceptions apply. Players may hold more than one non-FIFA nationality.

No.	Pos.	Nation	Player
1	GK	MEX	Alfredo Frausto (on loan to Puebla)
5	DF	MEX	Álvaro Ortiz (retired)
8	FW	MEX	Sergio Santana (loan return to Querétaro)
9	FW	ARG	Lucas Viatri (loan return to (Argentina) Boca Juniors)
10	FW	MEX	Carlos Ochoa (loan return to Santos Laguna)
15	MF	MEX	César de la Peña (loan return to Monterrey)
16	MF	PAR	David Mendieta (on loan to BUAP)
17	MF	MEX	David Toledo (loan return to Querétaro)
18	MF	COL	Avilés Hurtado (loan return to Pachuca)
19	FW	MEX	Mario Ortiz (on loan to Coras de Tepic)
20	DF	MEX	Felix Araujo (on loan to UDG)
23	FW	MEX	Martín Zúñiga (loan return to América)
25	FW	COL	Wilberto Cosme (loan return to Querétaro)
27	DF	MEX	Manuel Jiménez (on loan to BUAP)
32	MF	CRC	Pablo Gabas (to (Costa Rica) Alajuelense)
––	MF	MEX	Francisco Acuña (on loan return to Puebla, presviously on loan at Morelia)
––	FW	ARG	Alfredo Moreno (to Tijuana, previously on loan at Veracruz)

=== Cruz Azul ===
In: Note: Flags indicate national team as defined under FIFA eligibility rules; some limited exceptions apply. Players may hold more than one non-FIFA nationality.

No.	Pos.	Nation	Player
—	GK	MEX	Yosgart Gutiérrez (loan return from Atlante)
—	DF	ARG	Emanuel Loeschbor (on loan from Morelia, previously on loan)
—	DF	MEX	Francisco Javier Rodríguez (from América)
—	MF	ARG	Hernán Bernardello (from (Canada) Montreal Impact)
—	MF	MEX	Alejandro Vela (loan return from Atlante)
—	FW	ARG	Pablo Gabriel Torres (from Cruz Azul Hidalgo)
—	FW	MEX	Aníbal Zurdo (from (Spain) Sabadell)

Out: Note: Flags indicate national team as defined under FIFA eligibility rules; some limited exceptions apply. Players may hold more than one non-FIFA nationality.

No.	Pos.	Nation	Player
18	MF	MEX	Sergio Nápoles (to Guadalajara)
19	FW	MEX	Jerónimo Amione (on loan to Toluca)
23	MF	USA	Michael Farfan (released)
53	DF	MEX	Horacio Cervantes (on loan to Chiapas)
––	GK	MEX	Manuel Gibrán Lajud (on loan to Tijuana)
––	FW	MEX	Antonio Pedroza (on loan to (Costa Rica) Herediano, previously on loan at Cruz Azul Hidalgo)

=== Guadalajara ===
In: Note: Flags indicate national team as defined under FIFA eligibility rules; some limited exceptions apply. Players may hold more than one non-FIFA nationality.

No.	Pos.	Nation	Player
—	GK	MEX	Luis Ernesto Michel (loan return from (Costa Rica) Saprissa)
—	DF	MEX	Carlos Salcido (from UANL)
—	MF	MEX	Fernando Arce (from Tijuana)
—	MF	MEX	Sergio Nápoles (from Cruz Azul)
—	MF	MEX	Ángel Reyna (from Veracruz)
—	MF	MEX	David Toledo (from Querétaro, previously on loan at Chiapas)
—	FW	MEX	Alberto García (on loan from Atlante)

Out: Note: Flags indicate national team as defined under FIFA eligibility rules; some limited exceptions apply. Players may hold more than one non-FIFA nationality.

No.	Pos.	Nation	Player
13	DF	MEX	Abraham Coronado (on loan to Coras de Tepic)
15	DF	MEX	Víctor Perales (to Veracruz)
23	GK	MEX	Víctor Hugo Hernández (on loan to Querétaro)
24	FW	MEX	Carlos Cisneros (on loan to Coras de Tepic)
29	MF	MEX	Michael Pérez (on loan to Coras de Tepic)
35	FW	MEX	Julio Morales (on loan to Coras de Tepic)
45	FW	MEX	Diego Hernández (on loan to Coras de Tepic)
––	GK	MEX	Sergio Arias (on loan to Coras de Tepic, previously on loan at Oaxaca)
––	GK	MEX	Raúl Gudiño (on loan to (Portugal) Porto B)
––	DF	MEX	Miguel Basulto (on loan to Coras de Tepic, previously on loan at UDG)
––	DF	MEX	Arturo Ledesma (on loan to UAT, previously on loan at Oaxaca)
––	DF	MEX	Juan Antonio Ocampo (on loan to Coras de Tepic, previously on loan at Estudiantes Tecos)
––	DF	MEX	Héctor Reynoso (on loan to UDG, previously on loan at Morelia)
––	MF	MEX	Jorge Mora (on loan to Coras de Tepic, previously on loan at Los Altos)
––	MF	MEX	Raúl López (on loan to Coras de Tepic, previously on loan at UAT)

=== León ===
In: Note: Flags indicate national team as defined under FIFA eligibility rules; some limited exceptions apply. Players may hold more than one non-FIFA nationality.

No.	Pos.	Nation	Player
—	DF	ARG	Jonathan Bottinelli (from (Argentina) River Plate)
—	MF	MEX	Elías Hernández (from UANL, previously on loan)
—	MF	BRA	Derley (from (Brazil) Atlético Paranaense, previously on loan at (United Arab Emirates) Emirates Club)
—	FW	ARG	Martín Bravo (from UNAM)
—	FW	ECU	Marcos Caicedo (from (Ecuador) Emelec)
—	FW	COL	Yamilson Rivera (from (Colombia) América de Cali)

Out: Note: Flags indicate national team as defined under FIFA eligibility rules; some limited exceptions apply. Players may hold more than one non-FIFA nationality.

No.	Pos.	Nation	Player
4	DF	MEX	Rafael Márquez (to (Italy) Hellas Verona)
9	FW	URU	Matías Britos (to UNAM)
11	FW	COL	Franco Arizala (on loan to Chiapas)
20	MF	COL	Eisner Loboa (to Puebla)
42	DF	MEX	Onay Pineda (loan return to Querétaro)

=== Monterrey ===
In: Note: Flags indicate national team as defined under FIFA eligibility rules; some limited exceptions apply. Players may hold more than one non-FIFA nationality.

No.	Pos.	Nation	Player
—	DF	COL	Stefan Medina (from (Colombia) Atlético Nacional)
—	DF	MEX	Efraín Velarde (from UNAM)
—	MF	MEX	Gael Acosta (loan return from Atlante)
—	MF	PAR	Juan Rodrigo Rojas (from Universidad de Chile)
—	FW	MEX	Guillermo Madrigal (loan return from Atlante)
—	FW	COL	Dorlan Pabón (from (Spain) Valencia, previously on loan at (Brazil) Sao Paulo)

Out: Note: Flags indicate national team as defined under FIFA eligibility rules; some limited exceptions apply. Players may hold more than one non-FIFA nationality.

No.	Pos.	Nation	Player
3	DF	MEX	Leobardo López (to Veracruz)
4	DF	MEX	Ricardo Osorio (to Querétaro)
8	FW	COL	Wilson Morelo (on loan to (Colombia) Independiente Santa Fe)
9	FW	ECU	Marlon de Jesús (on loan to Puebla)
14	FW	MEX	Othoniel Arce (on loan to Querétaro)
15	DF	ARG	José María Basanta (to (Italy) Fiorentina)
24	MF	MEX	Gerardo Moreno (on loan to UAT)
33	MF	MEX	Alejandro Arturo García (on loan to UAT)
––	MF	MEX	César de la Peña (on loan to Atlético San Luis, previously on loan at Chiapas)
––	MF	MEX	Brayan Martínez (on loan to Mérida, previously on loan at Puebla)

=== Morelia ===
In: Note: Flags indicate national team as defined under FIFA eligibility rules; some limited exceptions apply. Players may hold more than one non-FIFA nationality.

No.	Pos.	Nation	Player
—	GK	MEX	Carlos López Rubio (on loan from América)
—	DF	PAR	Luis Cardozo (on loan from (Paraguay) Cerro Porteño)
—	DF	MEX	Carlos Guzmán (loan return from Puebla)
—	MF	URU	Diego Alaniz (from (Uruguay) River Plate de Montevideo)
—	MF	URU	Hamilton Pereira (from (Uruguay) River Plate de Montevideo)
—	FW	SVK	David Depetris (on loan from (Turkey) Çaykur Rizespor, previously on loan at (Czech Republic) Sigma Olomouc)
—	FW	MEX	Victor Guajardo (loan return from Querétaro)
—	FW	MEX	Miguel Sansores (loan return from Cruz Azul Hidalgo)

Out: Note: Flags indicate national team as defined under FIFA eligibility rules; some limited exceptions apply. Players may hold more than one non-FIFA nationality.

No.	Pos.	Nation	Player
3	FW	MEX	Héctor Reynoso (loan return to Guadalajara)
7	MF	URU	Egidio Arévalo Ríos (loan return to UANL)
8	MF	COL	Aldo Leao Ramírez (to Atlas)
10	MF	ECU	Jefferson Montero (to (Wales) Swansea City)
14	FW	MEX	Ever Guzmán (on loan to BUAP)
15	MF	MEX	Francisco Acuña (loan return to Chiapas)
21	GK	MEX	Fabián Villaseñor (on loan to Atlético San Luis)
25	MF	MEX	Jorge Sánchez (to Necaxa)
29	MF	MEX	Rodrigo Salinas (loan return to Puebla)
––	DF	ARG	Emanuel Loeschbor (on loan to Cruz Azul)

=== Pachuca ===
In: Note: Flags indicate national team as defined under FIFA eligibility rules; some limited exceptions apply. Players may hold more than one non-FIFA nationality.

No.	Pos.	Nation	Player
—	GK	MEX	Jorge Villalpando (from Puebla)
—	DF	COL	Aquivaldo Mosquera (from América)
—	MF	ARG	Diego Buonanotte (from (Spain) Granada)
—	MF	COL	Avilés Hurtado (loan return from Chiapas)
—	MF	MEX	Rodrigo Salinas (from Puebla, previously on loan at Morelia)
—	FW	ARG	Matías Alustiza (from Puebla)
—	FW	ARG	Ariel Nahuelpan (loan return from (Argentina) Tigre)

Out: Note: Flags indicate national team as defined under FIFA eligibility rules; some limited exceptions apply. Players may hold more than one non-FIFA nationality.

No.	Pos.	Nation	Player
2	DF	COL	Efraín Cortés (on loan to Puebla)
9	FW	MEX	Enrique Esqueda (on loan to Atlas)
10	MF	ECU	Alex Colón (on loan to Zacatecas)
13	MF	MEX	Edgar Andrade (to Veracruz)
14	FW	ECU	Enner Valencia (to (England) West Ham United)
26	MF	COL	John Pajoy (on loan to Puebla)
28	MF	MEX	Alberto Acosta (loan return to UANL)
30	GK	MEX	Rodolfo Cota (to Puebla)
––	FW	MEX	Steven Almeida (on loan to Zacatecas)
––	FW	MEX	Marco Bueno (on loan to Toluca, previously on loan at Estudiantes Tecos)

=== Puebla ===
In: Note: Flags indicate national team as defined under FIFA eligibility rules; some limited exceptions apply. Players may hold more than one non-FIFA nationality.

No.	Pos.	Nation	Player
—	GK	MEX	Rodolfo Cota (from Pachuca)
—	GK	MEX	Héctor Estrada (on loan from UANL)
—	GK	MEX	Alfredo Frausto (on loan from Chiapas)
—	DF	COL	Efraín Cortés (on loan from Pachuca)
—	DF	ARG	Mauricio Romero (from Atlante)
—	MF	MEX	Francisco Acuña (on loan from Chiapas, previously on loan at Morelia)
—	MF	MEX	Alberto Acosta (on loan from Tigres, previously on loan at Pachuca)
—	MF	MEX	Cuauhtémoc Blanco (from BUAP)
—	MF	MEX	Gerardo Espinoza (from Querétaro)
—	MF	MEX	Ricardo Esqueda (from Querétaro)
—	MF	COL	Eisner Loboa (from León)
—	MF	COL	John Pajoy (on loan from Pachuca)
—	MF	MEX	Saúl Villalobos (on loan from Atlas, previously on loan)
—	FW	COL	Wilberto Cosme (on loan from Querétaro, previously on loan at Chiapas)
—	FW	ECU	Marlon de Jesús (on loan from Monterrey)
—	FW	MEX	Luis Loroña (from Querétaro)
—	FW	MEX	Flavio Santos (on loan from Atlas)

Out: Note: Flags indicate national team as defined under FIFA eligibility rules; some limited exceptions apply. Players may hold more than one non-FIFA nationality.

No.	Pos.	Nation	Player
1	GK	MEX	Armando Navarrete (to Irapuato)
3	DF	MEX	Jaime Durán (on loan to UAT)
4	DF	MEX	Jesús Roberto Chávez (on loan to Atlas)
5	DF	MEX	Carlos Guzmán (loan return to Morelia)
8	MF	MEX	Alan Zamora (loan return to Querétaro)
10	MF	ARG	Iván Bella (to (Argentina) Lanús)
11	MF	USA	DaMarcus Beasley (to (United States) Houston Dynamo)
17	MF	URU	Carlos Sanchez (loan return to (Argentina) River Plate)
18	MF	MEX	Brayan Martínez (loan return to Monterrey)
21	FW	ARG	Matías Alustiza (to Pachuca)
23	GK	MEX	Jorge Villalpando (to Pachuca)
33	MF	MEX	Alberto Medina (on loan to Chiapas)
––	MF	MEX	Rodrigo Salinas (to Pachuca, previously on loan at Morelia)

=== Querétaro ===
In: Note: Flags indicate national team as defined under FIFA eligibility rules; some limited exceptions apply. Players may hold more than one non-FIFA nationality.

No.	Pos.	Nation	Player
—	GK	MEX	Víctor Hugo Hernández (on loan from Guadalajara)
—	DF	USA	Jonathan Bornstein (on loan from UANL, previously on loan at Atlante)
—	DF	MEX	Ricardo Osorio (from Monterrey)
—	DF	MEX	Raúl Rico (loan return from Delfines)
—	MF	BRA	Danilinho (on loan from UANL)
—	MF	MEX	Jorge Gastélum (loan return from Atlas)
—	MF	MEX	Emilio López (loan return from Delfines)
—	MF	BRA	Ronaldinho (from (Brazil) Atlético Mineiro)
—	MF	MEX	Sinha (on loan from Toluca)
—	FW	MEX	Othoniel Arce (on loan from Monterrey)
—	FW	MEX	Sergio Santana (loan return from Chiapas)
—	FW	MEX	Ángel Sepúlveda (loan return from Atlante)

Out: Note: Flags indicate national team as defined under FIFA eligibility rules; some limited exceptions apply. Players may hold more than one non-FIFA nationality.

No.	Pos.	Nation	Player
6	MF	MEX	Gerardo Espinoza (to Puebla)
8	MF	MEX	Diego de la Torre (to Chiapas)
9	FW	MEX	Isaac Romo (on loan to UDG)
12	MF	MEX	Christian Bermúdez (loan return to América)
13	MF	MEX	Moisés Velasco (loan return to Toluca)
14	MF	MEX	Luis Loroña (to Puebla)
18	MF	MEX	Ricardo Esqueda (to Puebla)
20	MF	MEX	Rodolfo Vilchis (to Atlas)
26	DF	MEX	Roberto Juárez (on loan to BUAP)
30	FW	MEX	Victor Guajardo (loan return to Morelia)
33	GK	MEX	Miguel Ángel Fraga (to Atlas)
60	DF	MEX	Gil Burón (loan return to América)
––	GK	MEX	Liborio Sánchez (on loan to Toluca, previously on loan at Delfines)
––	DF	MEX	Christian Pérez (on loan to Toluca, previously on loan at Delfines)
––	DF	MEX	Sergio Pérez Moya (on loan to Chiapas, previously on loan at Atlante)
––	DF	MEX	Onay Pineda (on loan to BUAP, previously on loan at León)
––	MF	MEX	David Toledo (to Guadalajara, previously on loan at Chiapas)
––	MF	MEX	Alan Zamora (on loan to Chiapas, previously on loan at Puebla)
––	FW	COL	Wilberto Cosme (on loan to Puebla, previously on loan at Chiapas)
––	FW	COL	Jhon Córdoba (to (Spain) Granada, previously on loan at (Spain) Espanyol)

=== Santos Laguna ===
In: Note: Flags indicate national team as defined under FIFA eligibility rules; some limited exceptions apply. Players may hold more than one non-FIFA nationality.

No.	Pos.	Nation	Player
—	DF	MEX	Adrián Aldrete (from América)
—	DF	ARG	Carlos Izquierdoz (from (Argentina) Lanús)
—	FW	CPV	Djaniny (from (Portugal) Nacional)

Out: Note: Flags indicate national team as defined under FIFA eligibility rules; some limited exceptions apply. Players may hold more than one non-FIFA nationality.

No.	Pos.	Nation	Player
6	MF	ESP	Marc Crosas (on loan to UDG)
15	FW	MEX	Eduardo Herrera (loan return to UNAM)
18	DF	URU	Jonathan Lacerda (to (Paraguay) Olimpia)
20	DF	MEX	Osmar Mares (on loan to America)
24	FW	MEX	Oribe Peralta (to América)
55	DF	MEX	Kenyi Adachi (on loan to Oaxaca)
––	DF	MEX	Aaron Galindo (to Toluca, previously on loan)
––	FW	MEX	Carlos Ochoa (on loan to Veracruz, previously on loan at Chiapas)

=== Tijuana ===
In: Note: Flags indicate national team as defined under FIFA eligibility rules; some limited exceptions apply. Players may hold more than one non-FIFA nationality.

No.	Pos.	Nation	Player
—	GK	MEX	Manuel Gibrán Lajud (on loan from Cruz Azul)
—	GK	MEX	Dilan Nicoletti (from (Argentina) Newell's Old Boys)
—	DF	MEX	Israel Jiménez (on loan from UANL)
—	DF	MEX	Alejandro Molina (on loan from Monterrey, previously on loan at Mérida)
—	MF	VEN	Juan Arango (from (Germany) Borussia Mönchengladbach)
—	MF	VEN	Jesús Javier Gómez (from Delfines)
—	FW	MEX	Henry Martin (on loan from Mérida)
—	FW	ARG	Alfredo Moreno (from Chiapas)
—	FW	USA	Amando Moreno (from (United States) New York Red Bulls)
—	FW	COL	Dayro Moreno (loan return from (Colombia) Millonarios)

Out: Note: Flags indicate national team as defined under FIFA eligibility rules; some limited exceptions apply. Players may hold more than one non-FIFA nationality.

No.	Pos.	Nation	Player
2	DF	USA	Edgar Castillo (to Atlas)
8	MF	MEX	Fernando Arce (to Guadalajara)
9	FW	USA	Herculez Gómez (on loan to UANL)
10	MF	ECU	Fidel Martínez (to UDG)
19	GK	MEX	Adrián Zermeño (on loan to Sinaloa)
20	FW	MEX	Daniel Márquez (on loan to Atlante)
25	GK	MEX	Sergio Vega Gómez (on loan to Celaya)
––	MF	VEN	Jesús Javier Gómez (on loan to Sinaloa)
––	MF	MEX	Juan de Dios Hernández (to Atlas, previously on loan at Sinaloa)
––	FW	MEX	José Madueña (on loan to América, previously on loan at Sinaloa)

=== Toluca ===
In: Note: Flags indicate national team as defined under FIFA eligibility rules; some limited exceptions apply. Players may hold more than one non-FIFA nationality.

No.	Pos.	Nation	Player
—	GK	MEX	Liborio Sánchez (on loan from Querétaro, previously on loan at Delfines)
—	DF	MEX	Aaron Galindo (from Santos Laguna, previously on loan)
—	DF	MEX	Christian Pérez (on loan from Querétaro, previously on loan at Delfines)
—	MF	ARG	Lucas Lobos (from Tigres)
—	FW	MEX	Jerónimo Amione (on loan from Cruz Azul)
—	FW	MEX	Marco Bueno (on loan from Pachuca, previously on loan at Estudiantes Tecos)

Out: Note: Flags indicate national team as defined under FIFA eligibility rules; some limited exceptions apply. Players may hold more than one non-FIFA nationality.

No.	Pos.	Nation	Player
5	MF	BRA	Wilson Tiago (to Tiburones Rojos de Veracruz)
10	MF	MEX	Sinha (on loan to Querétaro)
14	DF	MEX	Édgar Dueñas (on loan to Chiapas)
17	FW	URU	Juan Manuel Salgueiro (loan return to (Paraguay) Olimpia)
19	MF	MEX	Edy Germán Brambila (on loan to Atlas)
89	FW	MEX	Diego Gama (on loan to (Spain) Atlético de Madrid B)
––	MF	MEX	Moisés Velasco (on loan to América, previously on loan at Querétaro)

=== UANL ===
In: Note: Flags indicate national team as defined under FIFA eligibility rules; some limited exceptions apply. Players may hold more than one non-FIFA nationality.

No.	Pos.	Nation	Player
—	GK	ARG	Nahuel Guzmán (from (Argentina) Newell's Old Boys)
—	GK	MEX	Richard Sánchez (from (United States) Dallas, previously on loan at (United States) Fort Lauderdale Strikers)
—	DF	MEX	Antonio Briseño (from Atlas)
—	MF	URU	Egidio Arévalo Ríos (loan return from Morelia)
—	MF	MEX	Manuel Viniegra (loan return from Atlante)
—	FW	USA	Herculez Gómez (on loan from Tijuana)
—	FW	ECU	Joffre Guerrón (from (China) Beijing Guoan)
—	FW	ARG	Marco Ruben (on loan from (Ukraine) Dynamo Kyiv, previously on loan at (France) Evian)

Out: Note: Flags indicate national team as defined under FIFA eligibility rules; some limited exceptions apply. Players may hold more than one non-FIFA nationality.

No.	Pos.	Nation	Player
2	DF	MEX	Israel Jiménez (on loan to Tijuana)
9	FW	ARG	Emanuel Herrera (loan return to (France) Montpellier)
10	MF	BRA	Danilinho (on loan to Querétaro)
16	MF	ARG	Lucas Lobos (to Toluca)
22	MF	MEX	Édgar Iván Pacheco (on loan to Zacatecas)
30	DF	MEX	Carlos Salcido (to Guadalajara)
39	DF	MEX	Abel Fuentes (on loan to Oaxaca)
––	GK	MEX	Héctor Estrada (on loan to Puebla)
––	DF	USA	Jonathan Bornstein (on loan to Querétaro, previously on loan at Atlante)
––	DF	USA	Juan Pablo Ocegueda (on loan to Oaxaca)
––	MF	MEX	Alberto Acosta (on loan to Puebla, previously on loan at Pachuca)
––	MF	MEX	Elías Hernández (to León, previously on loan)
––	FW	MEX	Dieter Vargas (on loan to Atlético San Luis)

=== UDG ===
In: Note: Flags indicate national team as defined under FIFA eligibility rules; some limited exceptions apply. Players may hold more than one non-FIFA nationality.

No.	Pos.	Nation	Player
—	GK	MEX	Iván Vázquez Mellado (from Necaxa)
—	DF	MEX	Felix Araujo (on loan from Chiapas)
—	DF	ARG	Leandro Cufré (on loan from Atlas)
—	DF	MEX	Héctor Reynoso (on loan from Guadalajara, previously on loan at Morelia)
—	MF	MEX	Diego Campos (from Atlas, previously on loan at Estudiantes Tecos)
—	MF	ESP	Marc Crosas (on loan from Santos Laguna)
—	MF	ECU	Fidel Martínez (from Tijuana)
—	MF	MEX	Efrén Mendoza (from Atlas, previously on loan)
—	FW	MEX	Christian Díaz (on loan from Atlas)
—	FW	URU	William Ferreira (from (Bolivia) Bolívar)
—	FW	ARG	Andrés Ríos (on loan from América)
—	FW	MEX	Isaac Romo (on loan from Querétaro)

Out: Note: Flags indicate national team as defined under FIFA eligibility rules; some limited exceptions apply. Players may hold more than one non-FIFA nationality.

No.	Pos.	Nation	Player
24	DF	MEX	Miguel Basulto (loan return to Guadalajara)
27	FW	MEX	José Cruz Gutiérrez (to UAT)
31	FW	ARG	Gabriel Rodríguez (to (Chile) Ñublense)

=== UNAM ===
In: Note: Flags indicate national team as defined under FIFA eligibility rules; some limited exceptions apply. Players may hold more than one non-FIFA nationality.

No.	Pos.	Nation	Player
—	DF	ARG	Francisco Dutari (from (Argentina) Rosario Central)
—	FW	URU	Matías Britos (from León)
—	FW	MEX	Eduardo Herrera (loan return from Santos Laguna)

Out: Note: Flags indicate national team as defined under FIFA eligibility rules; some limited exceptions apply. Players may hold more than one non-FIFA nationality.

No.	Pos.	Nation	Player
2	DF	MEX	Efraín Velarde (to C.F. Monterrey)
10	FW	ARG	Martín Bravo (to León)
27	FW	MEX	David Izazola (on loan to Atlético San Luis)
––	DF	MEX	Aaron Sandoval (to (Spain) Espanyol B)

=== Veracruz ===
In: Note: Flags indicate national team as defined under FIFA eligibility rules; some limited exceptions apply. Players may hold more than one non-FIFA nationality.

No.	Pos.	Nation	Player
—	GK	MEX	Mario Rodríguez (on loan from Zacatepec)
—	DF	MEX	Leobardo López (from Monterrey)
—	DF	MEX	Victor Perales (from Guadalajara)
—	MF	MEX	Edgar Andrade (from Pachuca)
—	MF	BRA	Wilson Tiago (from Toluca)
—	FW	MEX	Carlos Ochoa (on loan from Santos Laguna, previously on loan at Chiapas)
—	FW	ARG	Daniel Villalva (from (Argentina) River Plate)

Out: Note: Flags indicate national team as defined under FIFA eligibility rules; some limited exceptions apply. Players may hold more than one non-FIFA nationality.

No.	Pos.	Nation	Player
8	FW	ARG	Alfredo Moreno (loan return to Chiapas)
10	MF	MEX	Ángel Reyna (to Guadalajara)
30	GK	MEX	Rubén Fernando García (on loan to Irapuato)

== See also ==
- 2014-15 Liga MX season
