= Clausura 2015 Copa MX =

Tournament details
- Country: Mexico
- Teams: 24

Final positions
- Champions: Puebla (5th title)
- Runners-up: Guadalajara

Tournament statistics
- Matches played: 79
- Goals scored: 223 (2.82 per match)
- Top goal scorer(s): Aldo de Nigris; Raúl Enríquez; Hérculez Gómez (5 goals each)

The Copa 2015 MX Clausura was the 73rd staging of the Copa MX, the 46th staging in the professional era and is the sixth tournament played since the 1996–97 edition.

This tournament started on January 20, 2015, and ended April 21, 2015.

Puebla won their fifth title after defeating Guadalajara 4–2 in the final.

== Participants Clausura 2015 ==
This tournament will feature the clubs from the Liga MX who did not participate in the 2014-15 CONCACAF Champions League (León, América, Pachuca and Cruz Azul), and the teams who will participate in the 2015 Copa Libertadores (UANL, Atlas and Morelia) will not participate as well. The first 13 Ascenso MX teams in the classification phase during the Apertura 2014 season will participate.

== Tiebreakers ==
If two or more clubs are equal on points on completion of the group matches, the following criteria are applied to determine the rankings:

1. superior goal difference;
2. higher number of goals scored;
3. scores of the group matches played among the clubs in question;
4. higher number of goals scored away in the group matches played among the clubs in question;
5. best position in the Relegation table;
6. fair play ranking;
7. drawing of lots.

== Group stage ==
All but one group is composed by four clubs, two from Liga MX and two from Ascenso MX. The remaining group will have one from Liga MX and three from Ascenso MX. Instead of a traditional robin-round schedule, the clubs will play in three two-legged "rounds", the last one being contested by clubs of the same league.

Each win gives a club 3 points, each draw gives 1 point. An extra point is awarded for every round won; a round is won by aggregated score, and if it is a tie, the extra point will be not be awarded to neither team.

Key to colours in group tables
Group winners advance to the Championship Stage
The two best second-placed teams also advance to the Championship Stage

All times are UTC-05:00 except for matches in Sinaloa, Tepic (both UTC−06:00) and Tijuana (UTC−07:00)

=== Group 1 ===
Pos	Team	Pld	W	D	L	RW	GF	GA	GD	Pts	
1	Querétaro	6	4	1	1	2	13	5	+8	15	Group winner
2	Santos Laguna	6	2	3	1	2	9	10	−1	11	
3	San Luis	6	2	1	3	1	7	11	−4	8	
4	Zacatecas	6	1	1	4	1	8	11	−3	5	

Updated to match(es) played on unknown. Source:

==== Round 1 ====
20 January 2015 First leg	Santos Laguna	2–2	Zacatecas	Torreón, Coahuila
21:00	Calderón 5'; Alanís 23'	Report	Hinestroza 85'; Cisneros 90+3'	Stadium: Estadio Corona; Attendance: 5,442; Referee: Roberto Ríos

27 January 2015 Second leg	Zacatecas	1–2	Santos Laguna	Zacatecas, Zacatecas
21:00	Hinestroza 61'	Report	Rivera 68'; Araujo 84'	Stadium: Estadio Francisco Villa; Attendance: 12,298; Referee: Fernando Hernández Gómez

Santos Laguna won the round 4–3 on aggregate

21 January 2015 First leg	San Luis	1–0	Querétaro	San Luis Potosí, San Luis Potosí
19:00	Cervantes 12'	Report		Stadium: Estadio Alfonso Lastras; Attendance: 21,533; Referee: Adonaí Escobedo González

27 January 2015 Second leg	Querétaro	3–2	San Luis	Querétaro, Querétaro
19:00	Pacheco 8'; William 61'; Sinha 70'	Report	de la Peña 52'; Franco 68'	Stadium: Estadio Corregidora; Referee: Miguel Ángel Chacón

Teams drew 3–3 on aggregate, San Luis won the round on away goals

==== Round 2 ====
3 February 2015 First leg	Querétaro	2–0	Zacatecas	Querétaro, Querétaro
19:00	Osuna 31'; Sepúlveda 59'	Report		Stadium: Estadio Corregidora; Referee: Erim Ramírez

17 February 2015 Second leg	Zacatecas	0–1	Querétaro	Zacatecas, Zacatecas
21:00		Report	López 37'	Stadium: Estadio Francisco Villa; Attendance: 13,442; Referee: Quetzalli Alvarado

Querétaro won the round 3–0 on aggregate

3 February 2015 First leg	San Luis	0–0	Santos Laguna	San Luis Potosí, San Luis Potosí
21:00		Report		Stadium: Estadio Alfonso Lastras; Attendance: 4,900; Referee: Adrián Ramírez

17 February 2015 Second leg	Santos Laguna	3–0	San Luis	Torreón, Coahuila
19:00	Rivera 19'; Orozco 76'; Mendoza 90'	Report		Stadium: Estadio Corona; Attendance: 7,690; Referee: Eduardo Galván

Santos Laguna won the round 3–0 on aggregate

==== Round 3 ====
24 February 2015 First leg	Zacatecas	0–1	San Luis	Zacatecas, Zacatecas
19:00		Report	Esqueda 90+2'	Stadium: Estadio Francisco Villa; Attendance: 2,684; Referee: Mario Alcántara

3 March 2015 Second leg	San Luis	3–5	Zacatecas	San Luis Potosí, San Luis Potosí
19:00	Reyes 2'; Leandrinho 24'; Treviño 52'	Report	Castañeda 31'; Maz 37'; Medina 65'; Inestal 69'; Íñigo 77'	Stadium: Estadio Alfonso Lastras; Attendance: 3,304; Referee: José Bisguerra

Zacatecas won the round 5–4 on aggregate

25 February 2015 First leg	Querétaro	5–0	Santos Laguna	Querétaro, Querétaro
21:00	Rubio 15', 35'; Osuna 26', 83'; Pineda 45'			Stadium: Estadio Corregidora; Attendance: 14,162; Referee: Victor Bisguerra

3 March 2015 Second leg	Santos Laguna	2–2	Querétaro	Torreón, Coahuila
21:00	Orozco 34'; Rentería 79'	Report	Sepúlveda 15', 86'	Stadium: Estadio Corona; Attendance: 10,532; Referee: Miguel Ángel Chacón

Querétaro won the round 7–2 on aggregate

=== Group 2 ===
Pos	Team	Pld	W	D	L	RW	GF	GA	GD	Pts	
1	Monterrey	6	4	1	1	2	14	3	+11	15	Group winner
2	UAT	6	3	3	0	3	9	6	+3	15	Best runner-up
3	Veracruz	6	1	2	3	1	5	8	−3	6	
4	Altamira	6	0	2	4	0	4	15	−11	2	

Updated to match(es) played on unknown. Source:

==== Round 1 ====
20 January 2015 First leg	Altamira	1–2	Veracruz	Altamira, Tamaulipas
19:00	Núñez 64'	Report	Vázquez 21', 27' (pen.)	Stadium: Estadio Altamira; Attendance: 1,372; Referee: Ángel Monroy

28 January 2015 Second leg	Veracruz	0–0	Altamira	Boca del Río, Veracruz
19:00		Report		Stadium: Estadio Luis "Pirata" Fuente; Attendance: 4,984; Referee: Miguel Ángel Ayala

Veracruz won the round 2–1 on aggregate

20 January 2015 First leg	Monterrey	0–1	UAT	Monterrey, Nuevo León
21:00		Report	Hernández 50'	Stadium: Estadio Tecnológico; Attendance: 15,780; Referee: Fabricio Morales

28 January 2015 Second leg	UAT	1–1	Monterrey	Ciudad Victoria, Tamaulipas
21:00	Olsina 50' (pen.)	Report	Lucas Silva 19'	Stadium: Estadio Marte R. Gómez; Attendance: 5,976; Referee: Jesús Bisguerra

UAT won the round 2–1 on aggregate

==== Round 2 ====
3 February 2015 First leg	Veracruz	1–1	UAT	Boca del Río, Veracruz
19:00	Vázquez 37'	Report	Gallegos 85'	Stadium: Estadio Luis "Pirata" Fuente; Attendance: 3,253; Referee: Roberto Ríos

17 February 2015 Second leg	UAT	2–1	Veracruz	Ciudad Victoria, Tamaulipas
19:00	García 16'; Cortés 88'	Report	Vázquez 19'	Stadium: Estadio Marte R. Gómez; Attendance: 972; Referee: Jonathan Hernández

UAT won the round 3–2 on aggregate

4 February 2015 First leg	Altamira	0–4	Monterrey	Altamira, Tamaulipas
21:00		Report	Arellano 19', 31'; Cardozo 70'; Barrera 87'	Stadium: Estadio Altamira; Referee: Ángel Flores

17 February 2015 Second leg	Monterrey	5–0	Altamira	Monterrey, Nuevo León
21:00	Pabón 1'; López 3'; Madrigal 24', 40'; Cardona 42'	Report		Stadium: Estadio Tecnológico; Attendance: 11,522; Referee: Erim Ramírez Ulloa

Monterrey won the round 9–0 on aggregate

==== Round 3 ====
25 February 2015 First leg	Altamira	2–2	UAT	Altamira, Tamaulipas
19:00	Orozco 63'; Malagueño 71' (pen.)	Report	González 40'; Ocampo 81' (pen.)	Stadium: Estadio Altamira; Attendance: 1,012; Referee: Arturo Cruz Hurtado

3 March 2015 Second leg	UAT	2–1	Altamira	Ciudad Victoria, Tamaulipas
19:00	Hernández 41'; Ocampo 77' (pen.)	Report	Dos Santos 62'	Stadium: Estadio Marte R. Gómez; Attendance: 1,053; Referee: Adonai Escobedo

UAT won the round 4–3 on aggregate

25 February 2015 First leg	Veracruz	0–1	Monterrey	Boca del Río, Veracruz
21:00		Report	Chará 87'	Stadium: Estadio Luis "Pirata" Fuente; Attendance: 9,320; Referee: Eduardo Galván Basulto

3 March 2015 Second leg	Monterrey	3–1	Veracruz	Monterrey, Nuevo León
21:00	Gracia 37'; Chará 56'; Pabón 74'	Report	Albín 49' (pen.)	Stadium: Estadio Tecnológico; Attendance: 19,003; Referee: Miguel Ángel Ayala

Monterrey won the round 4–1 on aggregate

=== Group 3 ===
Pos	Team	Pld	W	D	L	RW	GF	GA	GD	Pts	
1	Tijuana	6	4	2	0	3	14	6	+8	17	Group winner
2	Tepic	6	2	2	2	2	11	7	+4	10	
3	U. de G.	6	1	3	2	1	4	7	−3	7	
4	Necaxa	6	1	1	4	0	4	13	−9	4	

Updated to match(es) played on unknown. Source:

==== Round 1 ====
20 January 2015 First leg	Tepic	0–0	U. de G.	Tepic, Nayarit
20:00		Report		Stadium: Arena Cora; Attendance: 2,667; Referee: Marco Antonio Ortiz Nava

27 January 2015 Second leg	U. de G.	0–3	Tepic	Guadalajara, Jalisco
19:00		Report	Nuño 60'; Casillas 64'; Pacheco 77'	Stadium: Estadio Jalisco; Attendance: 1,316; Referee: Eduardo Galván

Tepic won the round 3–0 on aggregate

21 January 2015 First leg	Tijuana	3–0; Awarded	Necaxa	Tijuana, Baja California
19:00	Corona 45'; Martín 72'; Guido 74'	Report	García 27'	Stadium: Estadio Caliente; Attendance: 21,333; Referee: Eduardo Galván Basulto

27 January 2015 Second leg	Necaxa	1–3	Tijuana	Aguascalientes, Aguascalientes
19:00	Gallegos 28'	Report	Guido 11'; Villegas 84'; Martín 86'	Stadium: Estadio Victoria; Attendance: 4,926; Referee: Ángel Monroy Bello

Tijuana originally won the first leg 3–1 but Tijuana was later awarded a 3–0 win after Necaxa only had 6 registered Ascenso MX players available for the leg instead of the mandatory 8.

Tijuana won the round 6–1 on aggregate

==== Round 2 ====
4 February 2015 First leg	U. de G.	2–0	Necaxa	Guadalajara, Jalisco
19:00	Vilchis 37'; Vázquez 90+4'	Report		Stadium: Estadio Jalisco; Attendance: 2,013; Referee: Víctor Bisguerra

18 February 2015 Second leg	Necaxa	1–1	U. de G.	Aguascalientes, Aguascalientes
19:00	Rojas 89' (pen.)	Report	Anangonó 41'	Stadium: Estadio Victoria; Attendance: 4,005; Referee: Jesús Bisguerra Mendiola

U de G. won the round 3–1 on aggregate

4 February 2015 First leg	Tijuana	3–2	Tepic	Tijuana, Baja California
19:00	A. Moreno 35'; Martín 68'; L. García 88'	Report	Fernando 17'; Mora 67'	Stadium: Estadio Caliente; Attendance: 18,633; Referee: José Alfredo Peñaloza

17 February 2015 Second leg	Tepic	2–2	Tijuana	Tepic, Nayarit
20:00	Pacheco 6'; Basulto 7'	Report	Moreno 3'; Salas 64'	Stadium: Arena Cora; Attendance: 4,177; Referee: Saúl Orozco

Tijuana won the round 5–4 on aggregate

==== Round 3 ====
24 February 2015 First leg	U. de G.	1–1	Tijuana	Guadalajara, Jalisco
21:00	Barraza 90+3'	Report	Martín 86'	Stadium: Estadio Jalisco; Attendance: 2,891; Referee: Roberto Ríos

3 March 2015 Second leg	Tijuana	2–0	U. de G.	Tijuana, Baja California
19:00	Martín 13'; A. M. Moreno 59'	Report		Stadium: Estadio Caliente; Attendance: 26,333; Referee: León Barajas

Tijuana won the round 3–1 on aggregate

24 February 2015 First leg	Tepic	3–0	Necaxa	Tepic, Nayarit
20:00	Bautista 13'; Nuño 69', 88'	Report		Stadium: Arena Cora; Attendance: 2,304; Referee: Christian Adrián Ramírez

4 March 2015 Second leg	Necaxa	2–1	Tepic	Aguascalientes, Aguascalientes
21:00	Lojero 59'; Chaurand 84'	Report	Morales 30'	Stadium: Estadio Victoria; Attendance: 2,518; Referee: Diego Montaño

Tepic won the round 4–2 on aggregate

=== Group 4 ===
Pos	Team	Pld	W	D	L	RW	GF	GA	GD	Pts	
1	Guadalajara	6	4	1	1	2	7	3	+4	15	Group winner
2	Sinaloa	6	3	2	1	2	11	8	+3	13	
3	BUAP	6	2	0	4	1	7	9	−2	7	
4	Irapuato	6	1	1	4	0	1	6	−5	4	

Updated to match(es) played on unknown. Source:

==== Round 1 ====
20 January 2015 First leg	Irapuato	1–0	BUAP	Irapuato, Guanajuato
19:00	Rodríguez 90+3'	Report		Stadium: Estadio Sergio León Chávez; Attendance: 2,626; Referee: Uriel Olvera

27 January 2015 Second leg	BUAP	1–0	Irapuato	Puebla, Puebla
19:00	Castillo 3'	Report		Stadium: Estadio Universitario BUAP; Attendance: 2,762; Referee: Mario Alcántara

Teams drew 1–1 on aggregate and tied on away goals, thus neither team received the extra point

20 January 2015 First leg	Guadalajara	2–2	Sinaloa	Zapopan, Jalisco
19:00	de Nigris 60'; Gallardo 90'	Report	Enríquez 76' (pen.); Angulo 87'	Stadium: Estadio Omnilife; Attendance: 6,315; Referee: Erim Ramírez

28 January 2015 Second leg	Sinaloa	1–0	Guadalajara	Culiacán, Sinaloa
20:00	Enríquez 34'	Report		Stadium: Estadio Banorte; Attendance: 17,223; Referee: Baruch Absalón

Sinaloa won the round 3–2 on aggregate

==== Round 2 ====
3 February 2015 First leg	Guadalajara	2–0	BUAP	Zapopan, Jalisco
21:00	de Nigris 55'; Torres 79'	Report		Stadium: Estadio Omnilife; Attendance: 3,169; Referee: Erick Miranda

17 February 2015 Second leg	BUAP	0–1	Guadalajara	Puebla, Puebla
19:00		Report	de Nigris 30' (pen.)	Stadium: Estadio Universitario BUAP; Referee: Ángel Monroy

Guadalajara won the round 3–0 on aggregate

4 February 2015 First leg	Irapuato	0–0	Sinaloa	Irapuato, Guanajuato
21:00		Report		Stadium: Estadio Sergio León Chávez; Referee: Arturo Cruz

17 February 2015 Second leg	Sinaloa	3–0	Irapuato	Culiacán, Sinaloa
20:00	Enríquez 3', 78'; Rodriguez 34'	Report		Stadium: Estadio Banorte; Attendance: 4,624; Referee: Ángel Flores

Sinaloa won the round 3–0 on aggregate

==== Round 3 ====
24 February 2015 First leg	Irapuato	0–1	Guadalajara	Irapuato, Guanajuato
21:00		Report	Torres 81'	Stadium: Estadio Sergio León Chávez; Referee: Marco Antonio Ortiz

3 March 2015 Second leg	Guadalajara	1–0	Irapuato	Zapopan, Jalisco
19:00	Bravo 80'	Report		Stadium: Estadio Omnilife; Attendance: 7,144; Referee: Ricardo Arellano

Guadalajara won the round 2–0 on aggregate

25 February 2015 First leg	BUAP	4–1	Sinaloa	Puebla, Puebla
19:00	Arce 18', 61'; Tejada 24'; Piñón 50'	Report	Enríquez 70'	Stadium: Estadio Universitario BUAP; Attendance: 1,138

3 March 2015 Second leg	Sinaloa	4–2	BUAP	Culiacán, Sinaloa
20:00	Prieto 16'; Abrego 49', 90+1'; Nurse 84'	Report	Follé 36'; Arce 37'	Stadium: Estadio Banorte; Attendance: 4,312; Referee: Jonathan Hernández

BUAP won the round 6–5 on aggregate

=== Group 5 ===
Pos	Team	Pld	W	D	L	RW	GF	GA	GD	Pts	
1	Puebla	6	4	1	1	3	11	6	+5	16	Group winner
2	Mérida	6	4	0	2	2	13	7	+6	14	Best runner-up
3	Toluca	6	2	1	3	1	9	13	−4	8	
4	Atlante	6	0	2	4	0	5	12	−7	2	

Updated to match(es) played on unknown. Source:

==== Round 1 ====
20 January 2015 First leg	Puebla	2–0	Atlante	Puebla, Puebla
19:00	Blanco 29' (pen.); Gómez 47'	Report		Stadium: Estadio Universitario BUAP; Attendance: 4,432; Referee: Víctor Bisguerra Mendiola

27 January 2015 Second leg	Atlante	1–1	Puebla	Cancún, Quintana Roo
21:00	Salinas 62'	Report	Tamay 79'	Stadium: Estadio Andrés Quintana Roo; Attendance: 4,508; Referee: Jonathan Hernández

Puebla won the round 3–1 on aggregate

20 January 2015 First leg	Mérida	6–1	Toluca	Mérida, Yucatán
19:00	Briceño 22', 85'; Martín 22'; Mendoza 34'; Suárez 53'; López 89'	Report	Trejo 8'	Stadium: Estadio Carlos Iturralde; Attendance: 10,893; Referee: Arturo Cruz Hurtado

28 January 2015 First leg	Toluca	0–1	Mérida	Toluca, Estado de México
21:00		Report	Martín 33'	Stadium: Estadio Nemesio Díez; Attendance: 15,166; Referee: Miguel Ángel Ayala

Mérida won the round 7–1 on aggregate

==== Round 2 ====
3 February 2015 First leg	Toluca	3–1	Atlante	Toluca, Estado de México
19:00	Coronado 23', 59'; Nápoles 87'	Report	Salinas 57'	Stadium: Estadio Nemesio Díez; Referee: Miguel Ángel Ayala

17 February 2015 Second leg	Atlante	1–1	Toluca	Cancún, Quintana Roo
21:00	Guadarrama 69'	Report	Márquez 90'	Stadium: Estadio Andrés Quintana Roo; Attendance: 3,420; Referee: Gustavo Zamora

Toluca won the round 4–2 on aggregate

3 February 2015 First leg	Puebla	2–1	Mérida	Puebla, Puebla
21:00	Gómez 35'; Loboa 90+1'	Report	Polo 86' (pen.)	Stadium: Estadio Universitario BUAP; Referee: Eduardo Galván

17 February 2015 Second leg	Mérida	0–2	Puebla	Mérida, Yucatán
19:00		Report	Pérez 33'; Cosme 45'	Stadium: Estadio Carlos Iturralde; Attendance: 13,883; Referee: Mario Alcántara

Puebla won the round 4–1 on aggregate

==== Round 3 ====
24 February 2015 First leg	Toluca	4–3	Puebla	Toluca, Estado de México
19:00	Nava 8'; Almazán 38'; Bueno 69'; Amione 84'	Report	Gómez 24', 39'; Robles 87'	Stadium: Estadio Nemesio Díez; Attendance: 9,131; Referee: Jorge Isaac Rojas

4 March 2015 Second leg	Puebla	1–0	Toluca	Puebla, Puebla
19:00	Cosme 90+3'	Report		Stadium: Estadio Universitario BUAP; Attendance: 7,800; Referee: Miguel Ángel Flores

Teams drew 4–4 on aggregate, Puebla won the round on away goals

24 February 2015 First leg	Atlante	2–3	Mérida	Cancún, Quintana Roo
20:00	Estrada 23'; Maldonado 41'	Report	Martínez 44', 60'; Briceño 90'	Stadium: Estadio Andrés Quintana Roo; Attendance: 2,281; Referee: Baruch Absalon Castellanos

3 March 2015 Second leg	Mérida	2–0	Atlante	Mérida, Yucatán
19:00	Martínez 25'; Salazar 41'	Report		Stadium: Estadio Carlos Iturralde; Attendance: 7,174; Referee: Quetzalli Alvarado

Mérida won the round 5–2 on aggregate

=== Group 6 ===
Pos	Team	Pld	W	D	L	RW	GF	GA	GD	Pts	
1	Chiapas	6	4	0	2	1	12	8	+4	13	Group winner
2	Zacatepec	6	3	1	2	2	11	8	+3	12	
3	UNAM	6	2	1	3	2	6	10	−4	9	
4	Oaxaca	6	2	0	4	1	9	12	−3	7	

Updated to match(es) played on unknown. Source:

==== Round 1 ====
20 January 2015 First leg	Chiapas	1–3	Oaxaca	Tuxtla Gutiérrez, Chiapas
19:00	Andrade 31' (pen.)	Report	Pineda 38'; Padilla 40'; Sánchez 43'	Stadium: Estadio Víctor Manuel Reyna; Attendance: 892; Referee: Jorge Antonio Pérez

28 January 2015 Second leg	Oaxaca	0–2	Chiapas	Oaxaca, Oaxaca
19:00		Report	Andrade 20' (pen.); Díaz 56'	Stadium: Estadio Benito Juárez; Attendance: 6,150; Referee: Oscar Villagómez

Teams drew 3–3 on aggregate, Oaxaca won the round on away goals.

21 January 2015 First leg	UNAM	1–0	Zacatepec	Distrito Federal
21:00	López 19'	Report		Stadium: Estadio Olímpico Universitario; Attendance: 5,005; Referee: Erick Miranda

27 January 2015 Second leg	Zacatepec	1–1	UNAM	Zacatepec, Morelos
21:00	Bustos 90+2'	Report	Nieto 32'	Stadium: Estadio Agustín Coruco Díaz; Attendance: 10,091; Referee: Saúl Orozco Najera

UNAM won the round 2–1 on aggregate

==== Round 2 ====
4 February 2015 First leg	Chiapas	0–2	Zacatepec	Tuxtla Gutiérrez, Chiapas
19:00		Report	Pandini 12'; Rojas 34'	Stadium: Estadio Víctor Manuel Reyna; Attendance: 4,140; Referee: Miguel Ángel Chacón

18 February 2015 Second leg	Zacatepec	2–3	Chiapas	Zacatepec, Morelos
19:00	Gutiérrez 6'; Rojas 15'	Report	Bermúdez 47'; Farfán 81'; Marín 86'	Stadium: Estadio Agustín Coruco Díaz; Attendance: 8,269; Referee: Jesús Guerrero

Zacatepec won the round 4–3 on aggregate

4 February 2015 First leg	Oaxaca	3–2	UNAM	Oaxaca, Oaxaca
21:00	San Román 49'; Santoya 84'; Madrigal 90+3'	Report	Castillo 22' (o.g.); Sosa 59'	Stadium: Estadio Benito Juárez; Attendance: 9,570; Referee: Jonathan Hernández

18 February 2015 Second leg	UNAM	1–0	Oaxaca	Distrito Federal
21:00	Britos 17'	Report		Stadium: Estadio Olímpico Universitario; Attendance: 4,898; Referee: Roberto Ríos Jácome

Teams drew 3–3 on aggregate, UNAM won the round on away goals

==== Round 3 ====
24 February 2015 First leg	Zacatepec	2–1	Oaxaca	Zacatepec, Morelos
19:00	Espinoza 35' (pen.); Landín 90+1'	Report	Fuentes 28'	Stadium: Estadio Agustín Coruco Díaz; Attendance: 3,215; Referee: Jesús Bisguerra

4 March 2015 Second leg	Oaxaca	1–2	Zacatepec	Oaxaca, Oaxaca
19:00	Medina 40'	Report	Michel 42'; Pardini 46'	Stadium: Estadio Benito Juárez; Attendance: 3,820; Referee: Arturo Cruz

Zacatepec won the round 4–2 on aggregate

24 February 2015 First leg	UNAM	0–3	Chiapas	Distrito Federal
21:00		Report	Díaz 25' (pen.), 50'; Bermúdez 70'	Stadium: Estadio Olímpico Universitario; Attendance: 3,803; Referee: Miguel Ángel Ayala Ramírez

4 March 2015 Second leg	Chiapas	3–1	UNAM	Tuxtla Gutiérrez, Chiapas
21:00	Díaz 14'; Romero 54'; Arizala 58'	Report	Herrera 3'	Stadium: Estadio Víctor Manuel Reyna; Attendance: 17,582; Referee: Jesús Fabricio Morales

Chiapas won the round 6–1 on aggregate

=== Ranking of runners-up clubs ===
The best two runners-up advance to the Championship Stage. If two or more teams are equal on points on completion of the group matches, the following criteria are applied to determine the rankings:

1. superior goal difference;
2. higher number of goals scored;
3. higher number of goals scored away;
4. best position in the Relegation table;
5. fair play ranking;
6. drawing of lots.

Pos	Grp	Team	Pld	W	D	L	RW	GF	GA	GD	Pts	
1	2	UAT	6	3	3	0	3	9	6	+3	15	Best runners-up
2	5	Mérida	6	4	0	2	2	13	7	+6	14	Best runners-up
3	4	Sinaloa	6	3	2	1	2	11	8	+3	13	
4	6	Zacatepec	6	3	1	2	2	11	8	+3	12	
5	1	Santos Laguna	6	2	3	1	2	9	10	−1	11	
6	3	Tepic	6	2	2	2	2	11	7	+4	10	

Updated to match(es) played on unknown. Source:

== Championship stage ==
The eight clubs that advance to this stage were ranked and seeded 1 to 8 based on performance in the group stage. In case of ties, the same tiebreakers used to rank the runners-up were used.

In this stage, all the rounds will be a one-off match. If a game ends in a draw, it will proceed directly to a penalty shoot-out. The highest seeded club will host each match, regardless of which division each club belongs.

=== Seeding ===
Seed	Team	Pld	W	D	L	RW	GF	GA	GD	Pts
1	Tijuana	6	4	2	0	3	14	6	+8	17
2	Puebla	6	4	1	1	3	11	6	+5	16
3	Monterrey	6	4	1	1	2	14	3	+11	15
4	Querétaro	6	4	1	1	2	13	5	+8	15
5	Guadalajara	6	4	1	1	2	7	3	+4	15
6	UAT	6	3	3	0	3	9	6	+3	15
7	Mérida	6	4	0	2	2	13	7	+6	14
8	Chiapas	6	4	0	2	1	12	8	+4	13

Updated to match(es) played on unknown. Source:

=== Bracket ===
Quarterfinals
2	Puebla	2
7	Mérida	1
3	Monterrey	4
6	UAT	1
4	Querétaro	0 (3)
5	Guadalajara (p)	0 (4)
1	Tijuana	0
8	Chiapas	2

Semifinals
2	Puebla	3
3	Monterrey	0
5	Guadalajara	2
8	Chiapas	1

Final
2	Puebla	4
5	Guadalajara	2

=== Quarterfinals ===
10 March 2015
17:00

Puebla	2–1	Mérida
Blanco 16'; Gómez 63'	Report	Mendoza 5'

Estadio Universitario BUAP, Puebla
Attendance: 5,616
Referee: Eduardo Galván

10 March 2015
19:15

Querétaro	0–0	Guadalajara
	Report
Penalties
Sinha (penalty missed); Osuna (penalty scored); Villa (penalty scored); Pacheco (penalty scored); Danilinho (penalty missed)	3–4	(penalty scored) Arce; (penalty scored) Hernández; (penalty missed) Esparza; (penalty scored) Torres; (penalty scored) Bravo

Estadio Corregidora, Querétaro
Attendance: 15,862
Referee: Miguel Ángel Ayala

11 March 2015
20:00

Tijuana	0–2	Chiapas
	Report	Díaz 64' (pen.); Andrade 74'

Estadio Caliente, Tijuana
Attendance: 26,333
Referee: Miguel Ángel Chacón

17 March 2015
20:30

Monterrey	4–1	UAT
Cardona 4', 56'; Chará 40'; Pabón 67'	Report	Orozco 42'

Estadio Tecnológico, Monterrey
Attendance: 23,339
Referee: Roberto Ríos
1. Match originally scheduled for 10 March 2015, but was postponed due to inclement weather.

=== Semifinals ===
18 March 2015
20:30

Guadalajara	2–1	Chiapas
Reyna 62'; Torres 73'	Report	Romero 51'

Estadio Omnilife, Zapopan
Attendance: 21,147
Referee: Oscar Macías Romo

7 April 2015
20:00

Puebla	3–0	Monterrey
de Luna 25'; Cosme 45+2'; Blanco 53' (pen.)	Report

Estadio Universitario BUAP, Puebla
Referee: Erick Miranda

=== Final ===
21 April 2015
20:00

Puebla	4–2	Guadalajara
Erpen 4'; Rey 25'; Alustiza 59' (pen.), 67'	Report	de Nigris 55', 56'

Estadio Universitario BUAP, Puebla
Referee: Luis Enrique Santander

== Top goalscorers ==
Rank	Player	Club	Goals
1	(Mexico) Aldo de Nigris	Guadalajara	5
1	(Mexico) Raúl Enríquez	Sinaloa	5
1	(United States) Hérculez Gómez	Puebla	5
4	(Chile) Isaac Díaz	Chiapas	4
4	(Mexico) Henry Martín	Tijuana	4
4	(Mexico) Michel Vázquez	Veracruz	4
6	(Colombia) Andrés Andrade	Chiapas	3
6	(Mexico) Othoniel Arce	BUAP	3
6	(Mexico) Cuauhtémoc Blanco	Puebla	3
6	(Mexico) Ulices Briceño	Mérida	3
6	(Colombia) Edwin Cardona	Monterrey	3
6	(Colombia) Yimmi Chará	Monterrey	3
6	(Mexico) Brayan Martínez	Mérida	3
6	(Mexico) Miguel Nuño	Tepic	3
6	(Mexico) Mario Osuna	Querétaro	3
6	(Colombia) Dorlan Pabón	Monterrey	3
6	(Mexico) Ángel Sepúlveda	Querétaro	3
6	(Mexico) Erick Torres	Guadalajara	3

Source: LigaMX.net
