= 2015 Supercopa MX =

- Event: 2015 Supercopa MX
Puebla	Morelia
1	0
- Date: 20 July
- Venue: Toyota Stadium, Frisco, United States
- Referee: Kevin Terry, Jr. (United States)
- Attendance: 8,000

The 2015 Supercopa MX was a Mexican football match-up which was played on July 20, 2015 between the champions of the Apertura 2014 Copa MX, Monarcas Morelia, and the winner of the Clausura 2015 Copa MX, Puebla. Unlike the 2014 edition, which was played over two-legs hosted by each participating team, the 2015 Supercopa MX was a one match at a neutral venue, Toyota Stadium in Frisco, Texas, United States.

The winner of Supercopa MX typically earns a spot in the Copa Libertadores first stage as "Mexico 3". However, Santos Laguna who won the Apertura 2014 Copa MX qualified to the 2015–16 CONCACAF Champions League after winning the Clausura 2015 league title and are therefore ineligible for South American competitions. Which meant Puebla automatically earned a spot in the 2016 Copa Libertadores first stage. Winning the Clausura 2015 league title also meant Santos Laguna played the 2015 Campeón de Campeones against the winner of the Apertura 2014 league title Club América later that night. Therefore, Santos Laguna was replaced by Monarcas Morelia, the winners of the Apertura 2013 Copa MX and the 2014 Supercopa MX.

The 2015 Supercopa MX was part of a doubleheader, which also includes the 2015 Campeón de Campeones, organized by Univision Deportes, Soccer United Marketing (SUM), FC Dallas and Liga MX.

== Match details ==
20 July 2015
17:30

Puebla	1–0	Morelia
Rey 68'	Report

Toyota Stadium, Frisco
Attendance: 8,000
Referee: Kevin Terry, Jr. (United States)

Puebla	Morelia

GK	17	(Argentina) Cristian Campestrini
DF	3	(Mexico) Carlos Alberto Gutiérrez
DF	5	(Mexico) Mario de Luna
DF	22	(Mexico) Patricio Araujo (c)
DF	12	(Mexico) Óscar Rojas
MF	28	(Mexico) Francisco Torres
MF	8	(Mexico) Luis Robles
MF	27	(Mexico) Alberto Acosta		(substituted off) 56'
MF	10	(Mexico) Christian Bermúdez		(substituted off) 79'
MF	19	(Mexico) Flavio Santos	(yellow card) 46'	(substituted off) 63'
FW	18	(Colombia) Luis Gabriel Rey
Substitutions:
GK	1	(Mexico) Fabián Villaseñor
DF	20	(Mexico) Adrián Cortés
DF	26	(Mexico) Roberto Juárez		(substituted on) 79'
MF	16	(Mexico) David Toledo		(substituted on) 63'
MF	29	(Argentina) Ezequiel Rescaldani
FW	9	(Chile) Isaac Díaz
FW	29	(Argentina) Matías Alustiza		(substituted on) 56'
Manager:
(Argentina) Pablo Marini

GK	13	(Mexico) Cirilo Saucedo
DF	17	(Mexico) Hibert Ruiz	(yellow card) 44'
DF	4	(Argentina) Marco Torsiglieri	(yellow card) 29'
DF	5	(Argentina) Facundo Erpen
DF	2	(Mexico) Enrique Pérez (c)
MF	16	(Mexico) Cristian Pellerano
MF	8	(Mexico) Juan Pablo Rodríguez	(yellow card) 88'
MF	24	(Mexico) Dieter Villalpando		(substituted off) 77'
FW	9	(Colombia) Yorleys Mena		(substituted off) 52'
FW	7	(Paraguay) Pablo Velázquez		(substituted off) 58'
FW	23	(Colombia) Jefferson Cuero
Substitutions:
GK	1	(Mexico) Carlos Felipe Rodríguez
DF	6	(Mexico) Joel Huiqui
DF	25	(Mexico) Carlos Calvo
MF	10	(Argentina) Mauro Cejas		(substituted on) 77'
MF	22	(Mexico) Armando Zamorano		(substituted on) 52'
MF	26	(Mexico) Christian Valdez
FW	11	(Mexico) Carlos Ochoa		(substituted on) 58'
Manager:
(Mexico) Enrique Meza

Assistant referees:
Adam Garner (United States)
Jonathan Johnson (United States)
Fourth official:
Luis Guardia (United States)

== See also ==
- Apertura 2014 Copa MX
- Clausura 2015 Copa MX
