= José Guadalupe Cruz (footballer) =

Mexican footballer and manager (born 1967)

Personal information
- Full name: José Guadalupe Cruz Núñez
- Date of birth: 22 November 1967 (age 58)
- Place of birth: Acopeo, Michoacán, Mexico
- Height: 1.75 m (5 ft 9 in)
- Position: Defender

Team information
- Current team: Inter Toronto FC (Assistant)

Senior career*
Years	Team	Apps	(Gls)
1988–1990	Atlante		
1990–1991	Querétaro		
1991–1997	Atlante		

Managerial career
- 2004–2010: Atlante
- 2010–2013: Chiapas
- 2013–2014: Monterrey
- 2014: Monarcas Morelia
- 2015: Puebla
- 2016: Dorados de Sinaloa
- 2016–2018: Atlas
- 2019: Dorados de Sinaloa
- 2020–2021: Necaxa
- 2025: Malacateco
- 2026–: Inter Toronto FC (Assistant)
- * Club domestic league appearances and goals

José Guadalupe Cruz Núñez (born Wednesday 22 November 1967) is a Mexican former professional footballer and manager. He coached Atlante during the 2009 FIFA Club World Cup in Abu Dhabi, United Arab Emirates.

== Playing career ==
As a player, Cruz was a member of the Atlante side that won the 1993 Mexican championship.

== Managerial career ==
His close association with the club has continued into his coaching career. Two years into his second spell at the club, he has overseen a league title triumph and the Champions League victory that secured their spot in the 2009 FIFA Club World Cup. He generally favours an attacking style of play, although he has neutered this instinct somewhat during the Apertura, where he has typically operated with just one out-and-out striker.

On 26 August 2013, Cruz was appointed as manager of Monterrey after parting company with Víctor Manuel Vucetich.

== Honours ==
=== Player ===
Atlante

- Mexico Primera División: 1992–93

=== Manager ===
Atlante

- Mexico Primera División: Apertura 2007
- CONCACAF Champions League: 2008–09

Puebla

- Copa MX: Clausura 2015
