= Mario Osuna =

Mexican footballer (born 1988)

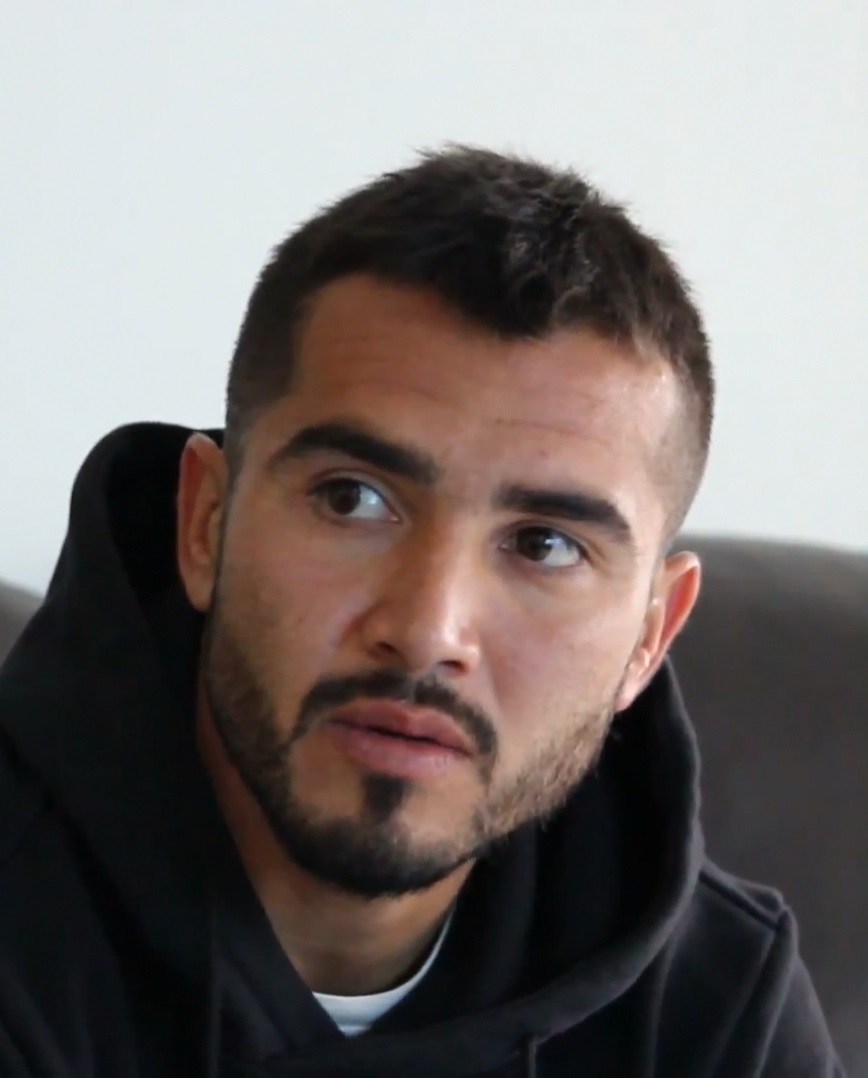

Personal information
- Full name: Mario Humberto Osuna Pereznúñez
- Date of birth: 20 August 1988 (age 38)
- Place of birth: Culiacán, Sinaloa, Mexico
- Height: 1.76 m (5 ft 9 in)
- Position: Defensive midfielder

Youth career
- 2007–2009: Dorados

Senior career*
Years	Team	Apps	(Gls)
2009–2013	Dorados	95	(7)
2013–2016	Querétaro	108	(5)
2017–2020	Morelia	91	(7)
2020–2021	Mazatlán	25	(2)
2021	América	5	(0)
2022	Dorados	9	(2)
2022	Querétaro	10	(1)
2023	Juárez	18	(0)

International career
2015	Mexico	3	(0)
- * Club domestic league appearances and goals as of 12 November 2023

Mario Humberto Osuna Pereznúñez (born 20 August 1988), also known as El Mono, is a Mexican professional footballer who plays as a midfielder.

== Club career ==
Osuna began his career with local team Sinaloa, debuting when he was aged 20 and after a few months he became an undisputed starter for the Dorados. In the fall of 2012, his team reached the final of the Ascenso MX, the Mexican Segunda Division, and won the Copa MX, becoming the first ever Segunda Division club to win the competition.

=== Querétaro ===
After four years, thanks to his good performances, he was bought at the end of the year by Querétaro quickly becoming a regular starter. He made his debut for the Gallos Blancos on 5 January 2013 on a 2–2 draw against León and scored his first goal on 19 July on a 1–3 loss against Morelia.

== International career ==
In April 2015, Osuna received his first call-up to the senior national team (managed by Miguel Herrera) for a friendly game against the United States, where he made his debut.

== Career statistics ==
=== International ===
As of match played 16 June 2015

National team	Year	Apps	Goals
Mexico	2015	3	0
Total		3	0

== Honours ==
Querétaro

- Copa MX: Apertura 2016
