= Jorge Ocampo =

Mexican footballer (born 1989)

Personal information
- Full name: Jorge Valente Ocampo Ortega
- Date of birth: 24 October 1989 (age 37)
- Place of birth: León, Mexico
- Height: 1.69 m (5 ft 7 in)
- Position: Midfielder

Youth career
- –2007: León

Senior career*
Years	Team	Apps	(Gls)
2007–2009	León	0	(0)
2009–2013	Celaya	46	(6)
2013–2015	Correcaminos UAT	31	(3)
2015	Cafetaleros de Chiapas	4	(0)
2016–2017	Lobos BUAP	4	(0)
- * Club domestic league appearances and goals

Jorge Valente Ocampo Ortega (born 24 October 1989) is a Mexican former professional footballer.
