= Alfonso Tamay =

Mexican footballer (born 1993)

Personal information
- Full name: Alfonso Arístides Tamay Sánchez
- Date of birth: 13 May 1993 (age 33)
- Place of birth: Benito Juárez, Quintana Roo, Mexico
- Height: 1.70 m (5 ft 7 in)
- Position: Winger

Team information
- Current team: Tepatitlán
- Number: 40

Youth career
- 2009–2011: UANL
- 2010: → Houston Dynamo (loan)

Senior career*
Years	Team	Apps	(Gls)
2011–2018	UANL	0	(0)
2013	→ UAT (loan)	4	(0)
2014–2015	→ Puebla (loan)	13	(1)
2016	→ Tapachula (loan)	6	(1)
2016–2017	→ Tampico Madero (loan)	12	(0)
2017	→ Oaxaca (loan)	18	(6)
2017–2018	→ BUAP (loan)	8	(0)
2018	Tapachula	8	(1)
2019–2020	Venados	37	(3)
2020–2021	Atlético Morelia	15	(3)
2021–2022	Atlante	31	(2)
2022	Oaxaca	17	(4)
2023–2024	Cancún	44	(9)
2024–2025	Tepatitlán	27	(8)
2025	Cobán Imperial	4	(0)
2026	Oaxaca	12	(1)
2026–	Tepatitlán	1	(0)
Medal record
Representing Mexico
Men's football
Olympic Qualifying Championship
Winner	2015 United States
- * Club domestic league appearances and goals as of 13 September 2026

Alfonso Arístides Tamay Sánchez (Note: In this Spanish name, the first or paternal surname is Tamay and the second or maternal family name is Sánchez.) (born 13 May 1993) is a Mexican professional footballer who plays as a winger for Liga de Expansión MX club Tepatitlán.

== Career ==
=== Youth ===
Alfonso Tamay came up through UANL youth system. He played for the Houston Dynamo in the 2010 SUM U-17 Cup as 'Tamay Sánchez' and led the tournament with four goals in four games. Back with Tigres for the Clausura 2011 Under-17 tournament, he won the goal-scoring title after scoring 17 goals.

In 2013, he was sent out on loan to Puebla, where he won the Copa Pachuca prior to making his league debut with Puebla on January 5, 2014, in a 2–2 draw against Pumas UNAM.

== Honours ==
Puebla

- Copa MX: Clausura 2015
- Supercopa MX: 2015

Atlante

- Liga de Expansión MX: Apertura 2021

Mexico Youth

- Central American and Caribbean Games: 2014
- Pan American Silver Medal: 2015
- CONCACAF Olympic Qualifying Championship: 2015
