= Miguel Nuño =

Mexican footballer (born 1993)

Personal information
- Full name: Miguel Alejandro Nuño Medina
- Date of birth: 1 December 1993 (age 32)
- Place of birth: Cocula, Jalisco, Mexico
- Height: 1.84 m (6 ft 0 in)
- Position: Striker

Youth career
- Guadalajara

Senior career*
Years	Team	Apps	(Gls)
2014–2017	Guadalajara	0	(0)
2014–2015	→ Coras (loan)	24	(1)
2016–2017	→ Guadalajara Premier (loan)	43	(11)
2017–2018	Loros UdeC	25	(6)
2018–2019	Tepatitlán de Morelos	25	(7)
2019–2021	CAFESSA Jalisco	39	(7)
- * Club domestic league appearances and goals

Miguel Alejandro Nuño Medina (born December 1, 1993) is a Mexican footballer who plays as a striker for Deportivo CAFESSA Jalisco in the Liga Premier de México.

== Career ==
=== C.D. Guadalajara ===
Nuño spent his whole youth career at C.D. Guadalajara's youth academy.

==== Loan at Coras ====
In July 2014, it was announced Nuño was sent out on loan to Ascenso MX club Coras de Tepic in order to gain professional playing experience. He made his professional debut on 22 August 2014 against Atlante. Miguel nuno loan contract expired in June 2016 and he was sent back to Guadalajara to play with the senior team
