= Isaac Díaz =

Chilean footballer (born 1990)

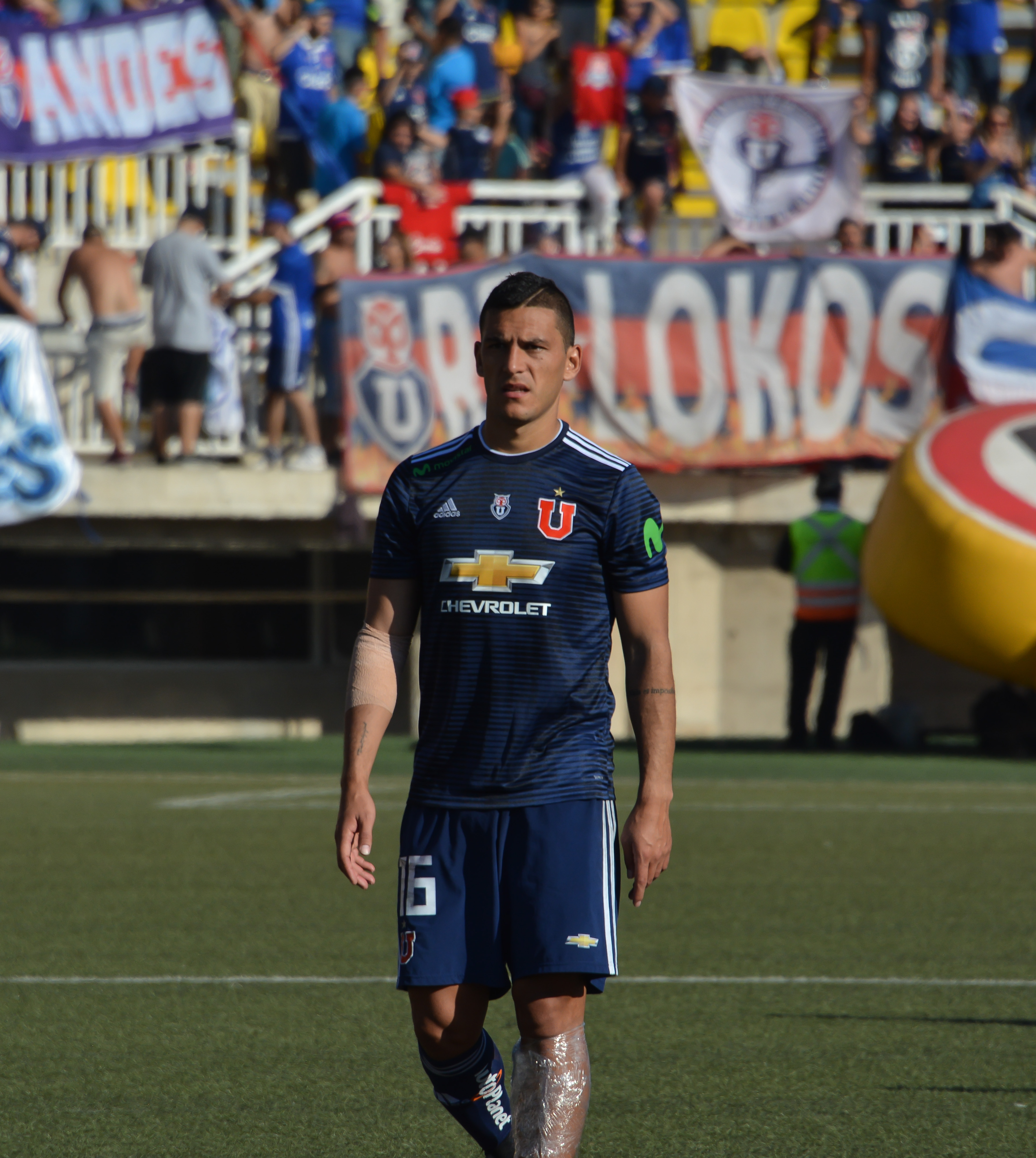
- Díaz with Universidad de Chile in 2018

Personal information
- Full name: Isaac Alejandro Díaz Lobos
- Date of birth: March 24, 1990 (age 36)
- Place of birth: Fresia, Chile
- Height: 1.84 m (6 ft 0 in)
- Position: Striker

Team information
- Current team: Deportes Iquique

Youth career
- 2005–2009: Huachipato

Senior career*
Years	Team	Apps	(Gls)
2009–2012	Huachipato	2	(0)
2010	→ Trasandino (loan)	8	(0)
2011	→ Naval (loan)	37	(7)
2012	→ Ñublense (loan)	34	(20)
2013–2014	Universidad de Chile	43	(18)
2014–2017	Chiapas	18	(2)
2015	→ Puebla (loan)	8	(0)
2016	→ Cafetaleros (loan)	11	(0)
2016–2017	→ Sol de América (loan)	32	(8)
2017–2018	Universidad de Chile	30	(2)
2019	Everton	16	(1)
2020	Cafetaleros	8	(5)
2020	Cancún	14	(3)
2021	Deportes Iquique	22	(4)
2022–2024	Deportes Copiapó	76	(16)
2025	Rangers	27	(10)
2026–	Deportes Iquique	0	(0)
- * Club domestic league appearances and goals as of 24 December 2025

Isaac Alejandro Díaz Lobos (born 24 March 1990) is a Chilean professional footballer who plays as a striker for Primera B side Deportes Iquique.

== Career ==
In December 2019, Díaz returned to Mexico and joined Ascenso MX club Cafetaleros, the club he also played for in 2016.

In 2021 season, Díaz returned to Chile and joined Primera B side Deportes Iquique.

In 2025, Díaz joined Rangers de Talca from Deportes Copiapó. The next year, he returned to Deportes Iquique.

== Honours ==
Universidad de Chile

- Copa Chile: 2012–13

Puebla

- Supercopa MX: 2015
