= Jhon Pajoy =

Colombian footballer (born 1988)

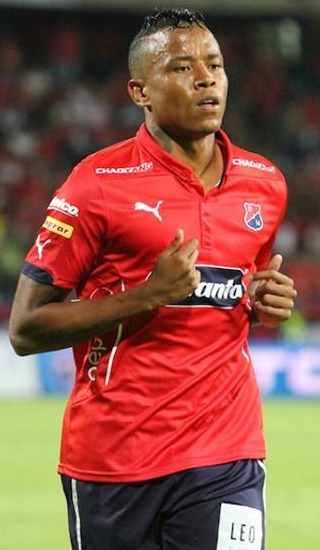
- Pajoy playing for Independiente Medellín in 2015

Personal information
- Full name: Jhon Fredy Pajoy Ortíz
- Date of birth: 10 November 1988 (age 37)
- Place of birth: Cali, Colombia
- Height: 1.70 m (5 ft 7 in)
- Position: Forward

Team information
- Current team: Miami United

Senior career*
Years	Team	Apps	(Gls)
2007–2009	Boyacá Chicó	2	(0)
2009–2010	→ Patriotas (loan)	?	(?)
2011–2012	Once Caldas	53	(16)
2012–2013	Atlético Nacional	40	(10)
2014–2018	Pachuca	18	(0)
2014–2015	→ Puebla (loan)	24	(3)
2015	→ Independiente Medellín (loan)	15	(3)
2016	→ Talleres de Córdoba (loan)	0	(0)
2016	→ Deportivo Cali (loan)	13	(2)
2017	→ Atlético Bucaramanga (loan)	21	(3)
2017–2018	→ Santa Fe (loan)	33	(5)
2018–2019	Al–Hazem	29	(2)
2019	San Martín SJ	7	(0)
2020	Deportivo Pasto	20	(5)
2021–2022	Atlético Junior	44	(1)
2023	Once Caldas	9	(0)
2024–	Miami United		
- * Club domestic league appearances and goals as of 20 March 2024

Jhon Fredy Pajoy Ortiz (born November 10, 1988) is a Colombian professional footballer who plays as a winger for National Premier Soccer League club Miami United.

Pajoy scored in his debut for Miami United, a 1–0 win over Chattanooga FC in the U.S. Open Cup.

== Honours ==
Season	Club	Title
2012	Atlético Nacional	Copa Colombia
2012	Atlético Nacional	Superliga Colombiana
2015	Puebla	Copa MX
