= César de la Peña =

Mexican footballer (born 1991)

Personal information
- Full name: César Fransisco de la Peña Rentería
- Date of birth: 22 June 1991 (age 35)
- Place of birth: Monterrey, Nuevo León, Mexico
- Height: 1.69 m (5 ft 7 in)
- Position: Midfielder

Senior career*
Years	Team	Apps	(Gls)
2011–2016	Monterrey	20	(0)
2013–2014	→ Chiapas (loan)	19	(0)
2014–2015	→ Atlético San Luis (loan)	24	(2)
2015	→ Veracruz (loan)	1	(0)
2016	→ Alebrijes de Oaxaca (loan)	15	(1)
2017	Belén	19	(3)
2017–2018	Correcaminos	24	(3)
2020	Celaya	4	(0)
2020	Lobos Zacatepec	0	(0)
2021	Halcones de Querétaro	0	(0)
- * Club domestic league appearances and goals

César Francisco de la Peña Rentería (born 22 June 1991) is a Mexican former footballer.

== Club career ==
Once one of the young promises of Monterrey but has played only a few minutes with the first team. He made his senior team debut on October 7, 2011, as a substitute in a match against Estudiantes Tecos in a 3 - 2 win of Monterrey. His parents Cesar de La Peña & Zulema Rentera have always supported his career since his days practising as an amateur. He was playing as amateur at Chivas AC in San Nicolas de los Garza, Nuevo León, when he was 10 years old. He has looked a great promise since then. His nickname is "Chorri" and he has one brother, Alan de la Peña, and a sister, Zuleyma de la Peña. His father, Cesar de la Peña, is considered as his main backer since he supported his career closely since Chorri was a child.

After a short loan spell with Belén where he impressed along with fellow Monterrey loanee Julio César Cruz, de la Peña signed with Correcaminos.
