= Rodolfo Cota =

Mexican footballer (born 1987)

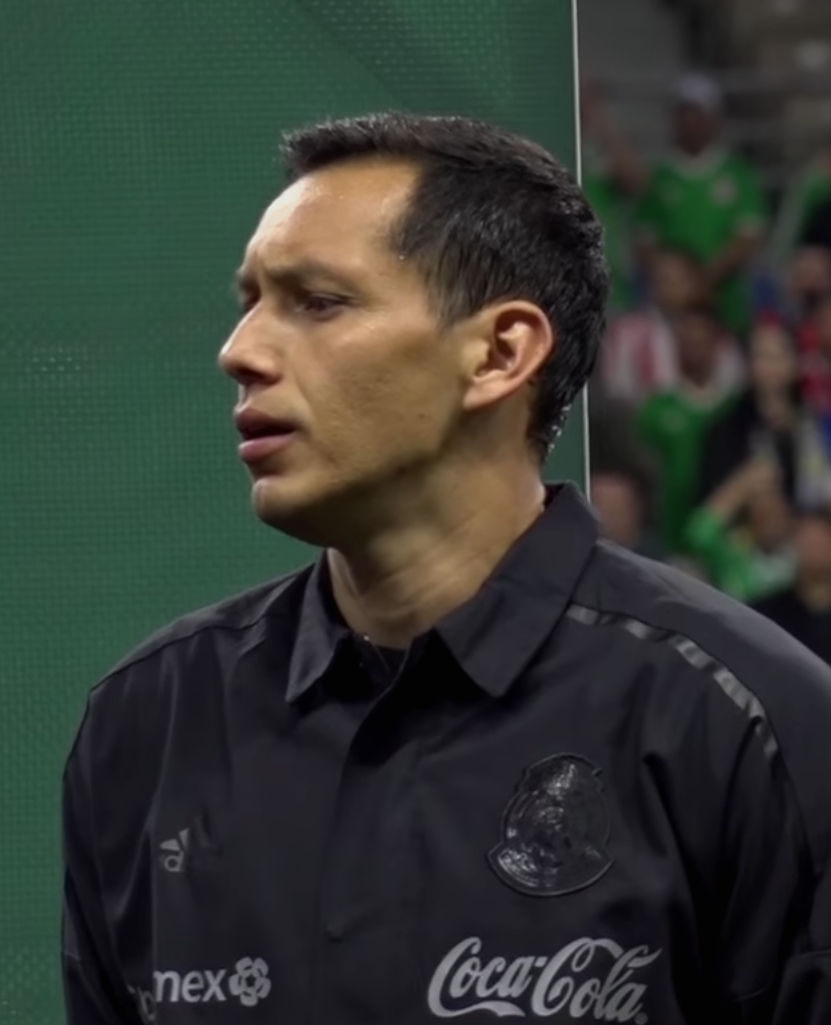
- Cota with Mexico in 2018

Personal information
- Full name: Rodolfo Cota Robles
- Date of birth: 3 July 1987 (age 39)
- Place of birth: Mazatlán, Sinaloa, Mexico
- Height: 1.85 m (6 ft 1 in)
- Position: Goalkeeper

Team information
- Current team: América
- Number: 30

Youth career
- Pachuca

Senior career*
Years	Team	Apps	(Gls)
2005	Pachuca Juniors	0	(0)
2006	Indios	0	(0)
2007–2018	Pachuca	74	(0)
2014–2015	→ Puebla (loan)	31	(0)
2015–2018	→ Guadalajara (loan)	88	(0)
2018–2026	León	207	(0)
2024–2026	→ América (loan)	18	(0)
2026–	América	8	(0)

International career^{‡}
2007	Mexico U20	1	(0)
2017–2022	Mexico	8	(0)
Medal record
Men's football
Representing Mexico
CONCACAF Gold Cup
Runner-up	2021 United States	Team
- * Club domestic league appearances and goals as of 28 October 2026 ‡ National team caps and goals as of 14 June 2022

Rodolfo Cota Robles (born 3 July 1987) is a Mexican professional footballer who plays as a goalkeeper for Liga MX club América.

== Club career ==
=== Pachuca ===
Cota made his professional debut for Pachuca on 21 September 2007 against Veracruz.

=== Puebla ===
In 2014 it was announced Cota was sent out on loan to Puebla. He made his debut against Tijuana in a 1–0 victory. In April 2015, he won the Copa MX after defeating Guadalajara.

=== Guadalajara ===
On 11 June 2015, Guadalajara announced they had signed Cota on loan in order to create competition with José Antonio Rodríguez, after club veteran Luis Ernesto Michel was sold to Dorados de Sinaloa. Cota then quickly rose to be the first-choice goalkeeper after his performances in the Copa MX, becoming champion after defeating Monarcas Morelia the Copa MX final, and became a key figure in the club's twelfth Liga MX title win against Tigres UANL. He was named in the Best XI of the tournament and won the Golden Glove award for the season.

The following season, he proved to be vital again as Guadalajara won the 2018 CONCACAF Champions League against Major League Soccer club Toronto FC, as he was rewarded the Golden Glove of the tournament and named in the Best XI.

=== León ===
On 16 May 2018, Cota completed a move to León.

Cota controversially wore a jersey to protest against femicide in Mexico during a match against Club Necaxa on 22 February 2020. The shirt had the figure of a woman lying in a pool of blood in the shape of a map of Mexico. Cota may be suspended for three matches and fined MXN $300,000 (US$15,000).

==== Loan to América ====
On 21 June 2024, Cota joined América on loan.

== International career ==
=== Youth ===
Cota represented the under-20 squad at the 2007 FIFA U-20 World Cup.

=== Senior ===
In September 2016, Cota received his first senior national team call-up under coach Juan Carlos Osorio for October friendlies against New Zealand and Panama.

Cota was included in the preliminary roster for the 2017 FIFA Confederations Cup in Russia as a replacement for José de Jesús Corona since he picked up an injury. Cota made his debut on 1 June 2017 in a friendly match against Ireland at MetLife Stadium in New Jersey, concluding in a 3–1 victory. Cota was subsequently included in Mexico's final roster for the tournament.

In October 2022, Cota was named in Mexico's preliminary 31-man squad for the 2022 FIFA World Cup, and in November, he was ultimately included in the final 26-man roster, but did not receive any minutes on the field during the tournament.

== Career statistics ==
=== Club ===
As of match played on 28 October 2026

Appearances and goals by club, season and competition
Club	Season	League			National cup		Continental		Other		Total	
Club	Season	Division	Apps	Goals	Apps	Goals	Apps	Goals	Apps	Goals	Apps	Goals
Pachuca	2007–08	Mexican Primera División	5	0	—		—		—		5	0
Pachuca	2008–09	Mexican Primera División	1	0	—		—		2	0	3	0
Pachuca	2009–10	Mexican Primera División	4	0	—		5 (Note: Appearances in CONCACAF Champions Cup)	0	—		9	0
Pachuca	2010–11	Mexican Primera División	8	0	—		—		1 (Note: Appearance in the North American SuperLiga)	0	9	0
Pachuca	2011–12	Mexican Primera División	21	0	—		—		—		21	0
Pachuca	2012–13	Liga MX	34	0	—		—		—		34	0
Pachuca	2013–14	Liga MX	1	0	14	0	—		—		15	0
Pachuca	Total		74	0	14	0	5	0	3	0	96	0
Puebla (loan)	2014–15	Liga MX	31	0	1	0	—		—		32	0
Guadalajara (loan)	2015–16	Liga MX	15	0	11	0	—		—		26	0
Guadalajara (loan)	2016–17	Liga MX	42	0	—		—		1 (Note: Appearance in Supercopa MX)	0	43	0
Guadalajara (loan)	2017–18	Liga MX	31	0	—		7	0	1 (Note: Appearances in Campeón de Campeones)	0	39	0
Guadalajara (loan)	Total		88	0	11	0	7	0	2	0	108	0
León	2018–19	Liga MX	36	0	—		—		—		36	0
León	2019–20	Liga MX	28	0	—		2	0	—		30	0
León	2020–21	Liga MX	36	0	—		2	0	—		38	0
León	2021–22	Liga MX	37	0	—		4	0	3 (Note: Appearances in Leagues Cup)	0	44	0
León	2022–23	Liga MX	36	0	—		8	0	—		44	0
León	2023–24	Liga MX	36	0	—		—		3	0	39	0
León	Total		209	0	—		16	0	6	0	231	0
América (loan)	2024–25	Liga MX	6	0	—		—		2 (Note: One appeareance in Campeón de Campeones, one appeareance in Leagues Cup)	0	8	0
América (loan)	2025–26	Liga MX	12	0	—		4	0	—		16	0
América (loan)	Total		18	0	—		4	0	2	0	24	0
América	2026–27	Liga MX	8	0	—		—		5	0	13	0
Career total			428	0	26	0	32	0	18	0	504	0

=== International ===
As of match played on 14 June 2022

Mexico
Year	Apps	Goals
2017	1	0
2018	1	0
2019	1	0
2020	1	0
2021	2	0
2022	2	0
Total	8	0

== Honours ==
Puebla

- Copa MX: Clausura 2015

Guadalajara

- Liga MX: Clausura 2017
- Copa MX: Apertura 2015, Clausura 2017
- Supercopa MX: 2016
- CONCACAF Champions League: 2018

León

- Liga MX: Guardianes 2020
- CONCACAF Champions League: 2023
- Leagues Cup: 2021

América

- Liga MX: Apertura 2024
- Campeones Cup: 2024

Individual

- Liga MX Golden Glove: 2016–17
- Liga MX Best XI: Clausura 2017
- CONCACAF Champions League Golden Glove: 2018
- CONCACAF Champions League Best XI: 2018
