= Sergio Nápoles =

Mexican footballer (born 1989)

Personal information
- Full name: Sergio Javier Nápoles Saucedo
- Date of birth: 23 November 1989 (age 36)
- Place of birth: Cancún, Quintana Roo, Mexico
- Height: 1.68 m (5 ft 6 in)
- Position: Winger

Senior career*
Years	Team	Apps	(Gls)
2011–2013	Atlante	21	(1)
2013–2014	Cruz Azul	35	(0)
2014	Guadalajara	4	(0)
2015	→ Toluca (loan)	2	(0)
2016	→ Venados (loan)	13	(0)
2016–2017	→ Coras (loan)	25	(3)
2018–2019	Alebrijes de Oaxaca	36	(3)
2019–2020	Venados	13	(1)
2020	Atlético Veracruz	0	(0)
2021	Walter Ferretti	17	(5)
- * Club domestic league appearances and goals as of 23 June 2021

Sergio Javier Nápoles Saucedo (Note: In this Spanish name, the first or paternal surname is Nápoles and the second or maternal family name is Saucedo.) (born 23 November 1989) is a Mexican footballer who plays as a winger for Walter Ferretti.

== Club career ==
=== Atlante F.C. ===
He made his professional debut under coach Miguel Herrera with Atlante F.C. in the Clausura 2011 coming in at the second half against América at the Azteca Stadium.

=== Cruz Azul ===
Nápoles signed with Cruz Azul before the start of the Apertura 2013. Coach Luis Fernando Tena used him as a left-back before making him return to his original position as a left-winger.

=== Club Deportivo Guadalajara ===
On June 4, 2014, he officially signed with Guadalajara.
