= Luis Gabriel Rey =

Colombian footballer (born 1980)

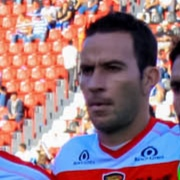

Personal information
- Full name: Luis Gabriel Rey Villamizar
- Date of birth: February 20, 1980 (age 46)
- Place of birth: Bucaramanga, Colombia
- Height: 1.82 m (5 ft 11 1/2 in)
- Position: Striker

Senior career*
Years	Team	Apps	(Gls)
2000	Atlético Bucaramanga	0	(0)
2001	Lobos BUAP	17	(7)
2002	Zitácuaro	0	(0)
2002	Acapulco	2	(2)
2003–2004	Atlante	76	(43)
2005–2007	Morelia	88	(26)
2007–2008	Pachuca	34	(5)
2008–2009	Atlante	37	(10)
2009–2011	Morelia	68	(15)
2011–2012	→ Chiapas (loan)	54	(24)
2013	Chiapas	17	(9)
2013–2014	América	54	(10)
2015	→ Puebla (loan)	35	(12)
2016–2017	Morelia	33	(2)
Total		515	(165)

International career
2003–2007	Colombia	16	(4)
- * Club domestic league appearances and goals

Luis Gabriel Rey Villamizar (February 20, 1980) is a Colombian former professional footballer who last played for Liga MX club Monarcas Morelia on loan from Club América.

A classical left-footed striker, Rey arrived to Mexico in 2001 and has scored over 150 goals in Liga MX. He holds Mexican citizenship. Nicknamed in Mexico as El Canguro (Spanish for kangaroo) due to his goal celebrations, he was part of the Colombia national team and played the Copa América 2007.

== Career ==
=== Early career ===
Rey debuted in 2000 with Atlético Bucaramanga, where he remained for one year, moved to Mexico and was transferred to Segundo Division clubs such as Lobos BUAP, Zitacuaro, and Acapulco; eventually he switched to Atlante FC.

=== Atlante ===
While at the club, he reaped great success as goalscorer, winning the league's Gold Boot, achieved in the 2003 Apertura, becoming the first Colombian to win that distinction in Mexico soccer. In his first stint with Atlante, Rey scored 43 goals in 76 appearances.

=== Morelia ===
In 2005, Rey signed with Monarcas Morelia where he managed to score 26 goals in 88 appearances from 2005 to 2007.

=== Pachuca ===
For the Apertura 2007, Rey was purchased by recently crowned champions Pachuca, along with Rafael Márquez Lugo, in a trade for Luis Angel Landin. Rey scored a three goals against Tigres UANL. Rey returned to Atlante to play the Apertura 2008, after scoring five goals in 34 matches.

=== Return to Morelia ===
During the 2009 Draft it was announced that Rey would return to Monarcas Morelia. While in preseason with the club in Zihuatanejo, Guerrero, Rey picked up an injury that would prevent him from playing the first match of the season. He would not reappeared until matchday six, against Atlas and score his first goal against UANL. In November 2009 Rey would score what he considers "the best goal of his career" against Club Deportivo Guadalajara at the Estadio Morelos. After a cross from teammate Jaime Duran, Rey attempted a successful bicycle-kick which beat goalkeeper Luis Ernesto Michel.

=== Jaguares de Chiapas ===
For the Apertura 2011, Rey was transferred to Jaguares de Chiapas, club in which he scored his 100th goal in the Mexican top-flight in the first match of the tournament against Monterrey. Appearing in over 70 matches and scoring 33 goals, Rey is one of the top goal-scorers in the club's history.

=== América ===
On June 5, 2013, Rey was signed by recently crowned league champions América. He scored his first goal for América on September 2 in the 4–1 win over UNAM. On 2015, Rey moved to Puebla FC.

=== Puebla ===
Puebla signed Rey in a season-long loan deal from Club América. Rey played a total of 38 games between Liga MX and the Copa MX, having scored a total of 11 goals in both competitions. At the end of the Apertura 2015 he returned with Club América.

=== Back on loan to Monarcas Morelia ===
On 9 December 2015, Monarcas Morelia announced that they had reached an agreement with Club América for the loan of Luis Gabriel Rey.

=== International goals ===
#	Date	Stadium	Rival	Goal	Result	Competition
1	March 2004	RFK Memorial Stadium, United States	El Salvador	1–0	2–0	Friendly
2	April 2005	Metropolitano Roberto Meléndez, Colombia	Peru	1–0	5–0	2006 FIFA World Cup qualification (CONMEBOL)
3	October 2005	Metropolitano Roberto Meléndez, Colombia	Chile	1–0	1–1	2006 FIFA World Cup qualification (CONMEBOL)
4	October 2005	Defensores del Chaco, Paraguay	Paraguay	1–0	1–0	2006 FIFA World Cup qualification (CONMEBOL)

== Honors ==
=== Club ===
Pachuca

- North American SuperLiga: 2007
- CONCACAF Champions' Cup: 2008

Atlante

- CONCACAF Champions League: 2008–09

Morelia

- North American SuperLiga: 2010

América

- Liga MX: Apertura 2014

Puebla

- Copa MX: Clausura 2015
- Supercopa MX: 2015

=== Individual ===
- Mexican Primera División top scorer: Apertura 2003
