= Giovani Hernández =

Mexican footballer (born 1993)

Personal information
- Full name: Emmanuel Giovani Hernández Neri
- Date of birth: 4 January 1993 (age 33)
- Place of birth: Guadalajara, Jalisco, Mexico
- Height: 1.71 m (5 ft 7 in)
- Position: Attacking midfielder

Team information
- Current team: Tlaxcala
- Number: 7

Senior career*
Years	Team	Apps	(Gls)
2012–2018	Guadalajara	62	(4)
2015	→ Sinaloa (loan)	10	(0)
2016–2017	→ Coras (loan)	26	(7)
2017	→ Veracruz (loan)	1	(0)
2018	→ Zacatepec (loan)	17	(3)
2018	→ Necaxa (loan)	1	(0)
2019–2020	Zacatepec	33	(10)
2020	Antigua	18	(2)
2021	Tampico Madero	36	(4)
2022	Tlaxcala	31	(6)
2023–2025	UAT	66	(13)
2026–	Tlaxcala	0	(0)

International career
2013	Mexico U20	2	(0)
- * Club domestic league appearances and goals as of 11 April 2025

Emmanuel Giovani Hernández Neri (born 4 January 1993) is a Mexican professional footballer who plays as an attacking midfielder for Liga de Expansión MX club Tlaxcala.

== Club career ==
Giovanni Hernandez started his career with C.D. Guadalajara. He scored a spectacular freekick against Querétaro in a 1–4 defeat on 21 September 2014.

=== Loan at Sinaloa ===
During the 2015 Liga MX Draft he was sent out on a six-month loan deal to Dorados de Sinaloa with no purchase option.

== Honours ==
Mexico U20

- CONCACAF U-20 Championship: 2013
