= Matías Alustiza =

Argentine footballer

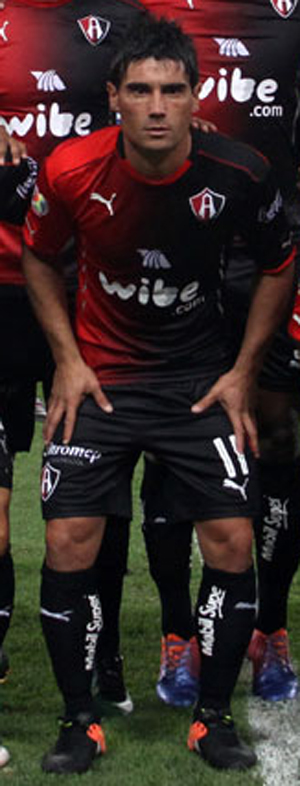

Personal information
- Full name: Gustavo Matías Alustiza
- Date of birth: May 31, 1984 (age 42)
- Place of birth: Azul, Argentina
- Height: 1.67 m (5 ft 5 1/2 in)
- Position: Forward

Team information
- Current team: Santamarina

Youth career
- 2001–2003: Banfield

Senior career*
Years	Team	Apps	(Gls)
2004–2006	Santamarina	?	(?)
2006–2011	Chacarita Juniors	71	(36)
2008	→ Albacete (loan)	16	(2)
2010	→ Xerez (loan)	11	(1)
2010–2011	→ Arsenal (loan)	23	(3)
2011–2012	Deportivo Quito	31	(18)
2012–2014	Puebla	63	(18)
2014	Pachuca	14	(5)
2015–2016	Puebla	58	(27)
2017–2018	Atlas	34	(14)
2018	→ UNAM (loan)	38	(9)
2019	Puebla	22	(6)
2020–2021	Atlético Tucumán	15	(3)
2021–	Santamarina	22	(4)
- * Club domestic league appearances and goals as of 20:38, 2 August 2022 (UTC)

Gustavo Matías Alustiza (born 31 May 1984) is an Argentine professional footballer who plays for Santamarina as a forward.

Nicknamed El Chavo (Mexican slang for boy), Alustiza holds Mexican citizenship since 2015.

== Career ==
Alustiza started his career in Deportivo Santamarina and then moved to Chacarita Juniors, where he won promotion to the Argentine Primera División. He played the first half of 2010 on loan for Spanish team Xerez CD. After returning to a recently relegated Chacarita in June 2010, he was loaned out to Arsenal de Sarandí.

=== Deportivo Quito ===
==== 2011 season ====
With good performances and goals, Matías Alustiza helped Deportivo Quito reach the 2011 Ecuadorian Serie A finals. He played both finals matches against Emelec, scoring in the second leg, winning the game 1–0 in the final minutes, and helped Quito become 2011 league champions.

==== 2012 season ====
Alustiza had a great 2012 season with Deportivo Quito, most notably in the 2012 Copa Libertadores, becoming joint-top goal-scorer next to Santos FC's Neymar Da Silva, scoring 8 goals. His first goal in the Copa Libertadores campaign came against Chivas de Guadalajara in a 1–1 away draw. Next was a single penalty scored by Alustiza in a 3–0 home win against Velez Sarsfield. His most notable participation in the tournament came in a home win against Chivas, in an emphatic 5–0 win, with Matías scoring 4 goals. Alustiza was given the match-ball for his 4 goals by the referee. Alustiza scored his final goals against Universidad de Chile. Matías Alustiza was then sold to Mexican club Puebla FC.

=== Puebla FC ===
On June 28, 2012, Puebla FC announced via their official Facebook page that they had signed Matías Alustiza and will be taking part in the Apertura 2012 and the Copa Mexico Apertura 2012. In the Apertura 2012, Matias scored his first goal in the third round against Santos Laguna where he scored twice. In the Clausura 2013 Copa MX Matias was runner up score leader with 7 goals in 6 games. On May 15, 2013, Puebla FC bought 50% of the player's contract from Ecuadorian club Quito and signed a 2-year extension that kept him at Puebla until 2015.

=== CF Pachuca ===
In June 2014, it was announced that CF Pachuca bought Alustiza from Puebla. On July 19 he made his debut with a goal for the win against Cruz Azul. On August 23, he scored a hat-trick against Atlas. In 2015, he returned to Puebla FC. He back to Puebla in 2019

== Style of play ==
Alustiza has good vision, passing, shooting, ball control, dribbling and speed. Despite his stature, he scores headers. His presence on the pitch has a good effect on his team's general performance. While he plays as a second striker usually, he can also play as a lone striker and attacking midfielder.

== Honors ==
Deportivo Quito

- Serie A : 2011

Puebla

- Copa MX: Clausura 2015
- Supercopa MX: 2015

=== Individual ===
- 2012 Copa Libertadores: Tropheo Alberto Spencer for Top Goal-scorer - 8 Goals (tied with Neymar)
