= Sergio Pérez (footballer, born 1986) =

Mexican footballer (born 1986)

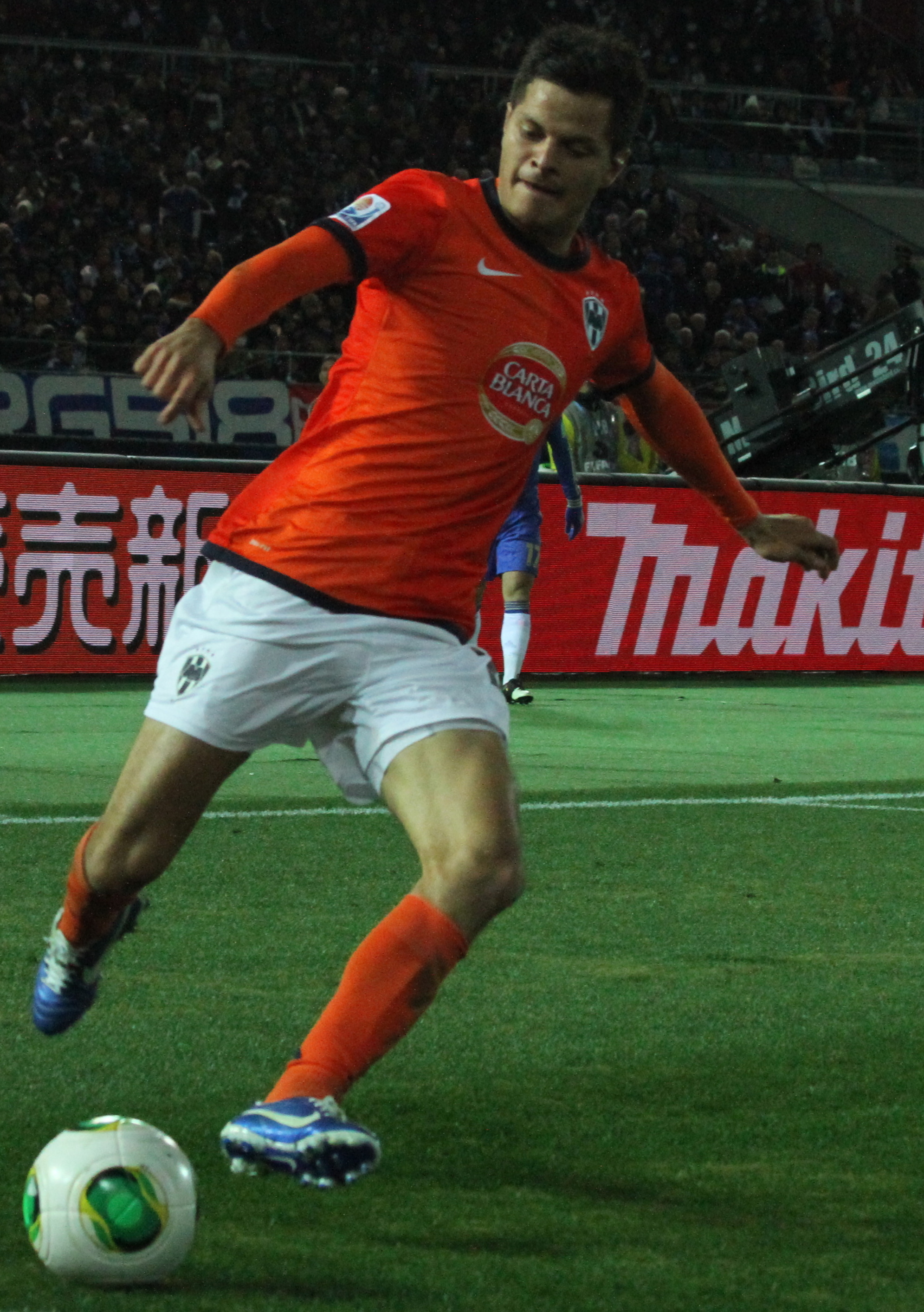
- Pérez with Monterrey at the 2012 FIFA Club World Cup

Personal information
- Full name: Sergio Pérez Moya
- Date of birth: 13 October 1986 (age 40)
- Place of birth: Puebla de Zaragoza, Mexico
- Height: 1.81 m (5 ft 11 in)
- Position: Right-back

Youth career
- 2001–2004: Puebla

Senior career*
| Years | Team | Apps | (Gls) |
| 2005–2010 | Puebla | 106 | (5) |
| 2006 | → Indios (loan) | 16 | (0) |
| 2010–2012 | Monterrey | 71 | (2) |
| 2013 | Guadalajara | 15 | (0) |
| 2013–2015 | Querétaro | 0 | (0) |
| 2014 | → Atlante (loan) | 24 | (0) |
| 2014 | → Chiapas (loan) | 2 | (0) |
| 2015–2016 | Puebla | 3 | (0) |
| 2017 | Venados | 4 | (1) |

International career
| 2011 | Mexico | 3 | (0) |

Managerial career
- 2022–2025: Tlaxcala (Assistant)
- * Club domestic league appearances and goals

Sergio Pérez Moya (born 13 October 1986) is a Mexican former professional footballer who played as a right-back.

== Career ==
He began his career 2005 in his hometown team and made his debut on January 11, 2005, in a game against Tigres UANL, this year Puebla was relegated to Primera A. He helped the team return to Primera División (First Division), since then he is a constant in the starting 11. In 2009, he signed a 4-year contract to play for C.F. Monterrey. In November 2010 he won his first championship with C.F. Monterrey.

=== Guadalajara ===
For the Clausura 2013, Sergio Perez was transferred to Chivas on a trade for Omar Arellano who was headed to Monterrey. Cherokee played as a regular starter for Chivas during his first season, as a right back due to the departure of Omar Esparza to San Luis.

=== Querétaro and Atlante ===
Pérez signed with Querétaro in 2013 but he was immediately loaned out to Atlante.

=== Chiapas ===
On 4 May 2014 Chiapas announced they had signed Pérez on loan from Querétaro.

=== International Caps ===
As of 11 October 2011

International appearances
| # | Date | Venue | Opponent | Result | Competition |
|---|---|---|---|---|---|
| 1. | 2 September 2011 | Pepsi Arena, Warsaw, Poland | Poland | 1–1 | Friendly |
| 2. | 4 September 2011 | Estadi Cornellà-El Prat, Barcelona, Spain | Chile | 1–0 | Friendly |
| 3. | 11 October 2011 | Estadio Corona, Torreón, Mexico | Brazil | 1–2 | Friendly |

== Honours ==
Puebla

- Primera A: Apertura 2006, Apertura 2007
- Ascenso: Apertura 2007
- Copa MX: Clausura 2015

Monterrey

- Mexican Primera División: Apertura 2010
- CONCACAF Champions League: 2010-11, 2011–12
