= Israel Villaseñor =

Mexican footballer (born 1982)

Personal information
- Full name: Fabián Israel Villaseñor López
- Date of birth: November 20, 1982 (age 43)
- Place of birth: San Julian, Jalisco, Mexico
- Height: 1.89 m (6 ft 2 in)
- Position: Goalkeeper

Youth career
- 2002–2003: Guadalajara

Senior career*
Years	Team	Apps	(Gls)
2004–2010	Veracruz	25	(0)
2008–2009	→ Jaguares (loan)	11	(0)
2009–2010	→ Tecos UAG (loan)	4	(0)
2010–2017	Chiapas	7	(0)
2014	→ Morelia (loan)	0	(0)
2014	→ San Luis (loan)	13	(0)
2015–2017	→ Puebla (loan)	7	(0)

Managerial career
- 2013: Chiapas Reserves and Academy
- 2018–2019: Atlas (Assistant)
- * Club domestic league appearances and goals as of 10 April 2016

Fabián Israel Villaseñor López (born 20 November 1982) is a Mexican former footballer who played as a goalkeeper.

He debuted with Veracruz in 2004, after an injury to starter Jorge Bernal. He played well and his team made it to the playoffs during the Primera División de México Apertura 2006 season but they were defeated by Chivas de Guadalajara both home and away. They lost 2–1 in the first game and then lost the second by a score of 4–0. Villaseñor was heavily criticized for his performance. In one instance, Omar Bravo from Chivas was able to steal the ball away from him and assist Alberto Medina, resulting in a goal. Chivas went on to win the tournament that same season, after defeating Toluca in the final.

When Bernal recovered, Villaseñor played with second division team Coatzacoalcos, where they made it to the quarter-finals against Puebla. They tied the 1st leg 2-2 and lost the second leg 3–1, where a last minute penalty was scored.

In the 2007 Apertura season, Villaseñor played as a starting goalie versus America, one of Mexico's oldest teams of prestige, in the 12th game of the season, and was almost kicked in the face when Hernan Rodrigo Lopez lost control of the ball and tried to fake a penalty shot. He almost earned himself a yellow for arguing with the referee when he refused to reprimand Lopez. The referee decided against it but warned Villaseñor to watch his temper. He has had very few previous incidents with temper, and is known for his fair play.

After the departure of Jose de Jesus Corona to Cruz Azul, he was brought in by Estudiantes Tecos to be the back-up to Mario Rodriguez.
