= Wilberto Cosme =

Colombian footballer (born 1984)

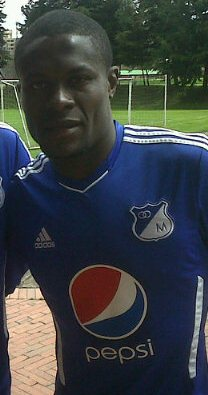

Personal information
- Full name: Wilberto Cosme Mosquera
- Date of birth: 22 July 1984 (age 42)
- Place of birth: Padilla, Cauca, Colombia
- Height: 1.78 m (5 ft 10 in)
- Position: Striker

Senior career*
Years	Team	Apps	(Gls)
2005–2013	Bogotá	65+	(52)
2006	→ Real Cartagena (loan)	12	(1)
2008	→ Atlético Huila (loan)	3	(0)
2010	→ América de Cali (loan)	8	(0)
2011	→ La Equidad (loan)	30	(5)
2012	→ Millonarios (loan)	33	(10)
2013	→ Querétaro (loan)	29	(11)
2014–2015	Chiapas	13	(4)
2014–2015	→ Puebla (loan)	25	(3)
2015–2016	Real Garcilaso	31	(11)
2017	Deportivo Pasto	18	(1)
2018–2019	Cúcuta Deportivo	23	(4)
- * Club domestic league appearances and goals as of 17 August 2023

Wilberto Cosme Mosquera (born 22 July 1984) is a Colombian professional footballer who played as a striker.
