= Apertura 2014 Copa MX =

Tournament details
- Country: Mexico
- Teams: 28

Final positions
- Champions: Santos Laguna (1st title)
- Runners-up: Puebla

Tournament statistics
- Matches played: 91
- Goals scored: 249 (2.74 per match)
- Top goal scorer: Andrés Rentería (6 goals)

The Apertura 2014 Copa MX was the 72nd staging of the Copa MX, the 45th staging in the professional era and the fifth tournament played since the 1996–97 edition.

This tournament started on July 29, 2014, and concluded in November 2014.

Santos Laguna won their first title after defeating Puebla 4–2 on penalty kicks.

== Participants Apertura 2014 ==
This tournament featured the clubs from the Liga MX who did not participate in the 2014-15 CONCACAF Champions League (América, Cruz Azul, León and Pachuca) All 14 Ascenso MX teams also participated in the tournament.

== Tiebreakers ==
If two or more clubs are equal on points on completion of the group matches, the following criteria are applied to determine the rankings:

1. superior goal difference;
2. higher number of goals scored;
3. scores of the group matches played among the clubs in question;
4. higher number of goals scored away in the group matches played among the clubs in question;
5. best position in the Relegation table;
6. fair play ranking;
7. drawing of lots.

== Group stage ==
Every group is composed by four clubs, two from Liga MX and two from Ascenso MX. Instead of a traditional robin-round schedule, the clubs will play in three two-legged "rounds", the last one being contested by clubs of the same league.

Each win gives a club 3 points, each draw gives 1 point. An extra point is awarded for every round won; a round is won by aggregated score, and if it is a tie, the extra point will be awarded to the team with higher number of goals scored away.

Key to colours in group tables
Group winners advance to the Championship Stage
The best second-placed team also advance to the Championship Stage

All times are UTC−06:00 except for matches in Sinaloa, Tepic (both UTC−07:00) and Tijuana (UTC−08:00)

=== Group 1 ===
Pos	Team	Pld	W	D	L	RW	GF	GA	GD	Pts	
1	UANL	6	4	0	2	3	10	5	+5	15	Group winner
2	Altamira	6	3	1	2	1	8	9	−1	11	
3	Querétaro	6	2	1	3	2	7	7	0	9	
4	Irapuato	6	2	0	4	0	6	10	−4	6	

Updated to match(es) played on unknown. Source:

==== Round 1 ====
29 July 2014 First leg	Irapuato	3−2	Querétaro	Irapuato, Guanajuato
19:00	Rivera 39', 42'; Tovar 77'	Report	Arce 61'; Ricardo Jesus 84' (pen.)	Stadium: Estadio Sergio León Chávez; Referee: Diego Montaño Robles

5 August 2014 Second leg	Querétaro	2−0	Irapuato	Querétaro, Querétaro
19:00	Ricardo Jesus 1'; Camilo 90+3'	Report		Stadium: Estadio Corregidora; Attendance: 6,332; Referee: Erim Ramírez Ulloa

Querétaro won the round 4−3 on aggregate

29 July 2014 First leg	UANL	4–0	Altamira	San Nicolás de los Garza, Nuevo León
21:00	Guerrón 42'; Rivas 45+1'; Briseño 62'; Luna 82'	Report		Stadium: Estadio Universitario; Attendance: 35,121; Referee: Víctor Bisguerra

6 August 2014 Second leg	Altamira	3–1	UANL	Altamira, Tamaulipas
21:00	Rojas 19'; Vargas 34'; Dos Santos 49'	Report	Martínez 46'	Stadium: Estadio Altamira; Attendance: 2,413; Referee: Jonathan Hernández

Tigres UANL won the round 5–3 on aggregate

==== Round 2 ====
19 August 2014 First leg	UANL	2–0	Irapuato	San Nicolás de los Garza, Nuevo León
21:00	Gómez 55'; Briseño 76'	Report		Stadium: Estadio Universitario; Attendance: 32,652; Referee: José Alfredo Peñaloza

27 August 2014 Second leg	Irapuato	2−1	UANL	Irapuato, Guanajuato
19:00	Tovar 2'; Bocanegra 71'	Report	Ruben 77'	Stadium: Estadio Sergio León Chávez; Attendance: 7,256; Referee: Jesús Leopoldo Guerrero

UANL won the round 3−2 on aggregate

20 August 2014 First leg	Altamira	0−1	Querétaro	Altamira, Tamaulipas
21:00		Report	Guastavino 42'	Stadium: Estadio Altamira; Attendance: 1,483; Referee: Marco Antonio Ortiz

26 August 2014 Second leg	Querétaro	2−2	Altamira	Querétaro, Querétaro
19:00	Ricardo Jesus 25', 45+1'	Report	Sifuentes 6'; González 79'	Stadium: Estadio Corregidora; Attendance: 4,498. Referee: Miguel Ángel Chacón

Querétaro won the round 3−2 on aggregate

==== Round 3 ====
17 September 2014 First leg	Irapuato	0−1	Altamira	Irapuato, Guanajuato
19:00		Report	González 66'	Stadium: Estadio Sergio León Chávez; Referee: Christian Ramírez

24 September 2014 Second leg	Altamira	2−1	Irapuato	Altamira, Tamaulipas
19:00	Aquino 86', 90+1'	Report	Cuellar 27'	Stadium: Estadio Altamira; Attendance: 782; Referee: Baruch Absalón

Atlamira won the round 3−1 on aggregate

17 September 2014 First leg	Querétaro	0−1	UANL	Querétaro, Querétaro
21:00		Report	Gómez 9'	Stadium: Estadio Corregidora; Attendance: 28,862; Referee: Oscar Macías

23 September 2014 Second leg	UANL	1−0	Querétaro	San Nicolás de los Garza, Nuevo León
21:00	Dueñas 62'	Report		Stadium: Estadio Universitario; Attendance: 40,638; Referee: Víctor Bisguerra Mendiola

UANL won the round 2−0 on aggregate

=== Group 2 ===
Pos	Team	Pld	W	D	L	RW	GF	GA	GD	Pts	
1	Santos Laguna	6	4	1	1	2	12	9	+3	15	Group winner
2	San Luis	6	2	3	1	2	11	6	+5	11	
3	Monterrey	6	2	1	3	2	10	8	+2	9	
4	UAT	6	1	1	4	0	7	18	−11	4	

Updated to match(es) played on unknown. Source:

==== Round 1 ====
29 July 2014 First leg	UAT	1–5	Monterrey	Ciudad Victoria, Tamaulipas
21:00	Nurse 25' (pen.)	Report	Ramírez 18'; Pabón 42' (pen.), 46'; Arellano 56'; Madrigal 87'	Stadium: Estadio Marte R. Gómez; Attendance: 4,162; Referee: Marco Antonio Ortiz

5 August 2014 Second leg	Monterrey	0–1	UAT	Monterrey, Nuevo León
21:00		Report	González 38'	Stadium: Estadio Tecnológico; Attendance: 22,714; Referee: Eduardo Galván

Monterrey won the round 5–2 on aggregate

30 July 2014 First leg	San Luis	3–1	Santos Laguna	San Luis Potosí, San Luis Potosí
19:00	Pineda 6'; Duarte 16'; Franco 90'	Report	Djaniny 11'	Stadium: Estadio Alfonso Lastras; Attendance: 9,885; Referee: Arturo Cruz

5 August 2014 Second leg	Santos Laguna	0–0	San Luis	Torreón, Coahuila
19:00		Report		Stadium: Estadio Corona; Referee: Luis Enrique Santander

San Luis won the round 3–1 on aggregate

==== Round 2 ====
19 August 2014 First leg	Santos Laguna	3–0	UAT	Torreón, Coahuila
21:00	Araujo 4'; Ramírez 28'; Calderón 45+1'	Report		Stadium: Estadio Corona; Attendance: 7,645; Referee: Víctor Bisguerra Mendiola

27 August 2014 Second leg	UAT	2–3	Santos Laguna	Ciudad Victoria, Tamaulipas
21:00	Saucedo 8', 76'	Report	Rentería 59', 70', 74'	Stadium: Estadio Marte R. Gómez; Attendance: 2,984; Referee: Saúl Fernando Orozco

Santos Laguna won the round 6–2 on aggregate

20 August 2014 First leg	San Luis	0–0	Monterrey	San Luis Potosí, San Luis Potosí
21:00		Report		Stadium: Estadio Alfonso Lastras; Attendance: 8,515; Referee: Fernando Hernández

26 August 2014 Second leg	Monterrey	2–1	San Luis	Monterrey, Nuevo León
21:00	Acosta 44'; Hernández 86'	Report	Miramontes 67'	Stadium: Estadio Tecnológico; Attendance: 17,514; Referee: Jorge Isaac Rojas

Monterrey won the round 2–1 on aggregate

==== Round 3 ====
16 September 2014 First leg	Monterrey	2–3	Santos Laguna	Monterrey, Nuevo León
21:00	Pabón 42', 44'	Report	Escoboza 35'; Rentería 90+1'; Djaniny 90+3'	Stadium: Estadio Tecnológico; Referee: Ricardo Arellano

23 September 2014 Second leg	Santos Laguna	2–1	Monterrey	Torreón, Coahuila
21:00	Izquierdoz 41'; Djaniny 90+1'	Report	Acosta 59'	Stadium: Estadio Corona; Attendance: 9,057; Referee: Roberto Ríos

Santos Laguna won the round 5–3 on aggregate

17 September 2014 First leg	San Luis	4–0	UAT	San Luis Potosí, San Luis Potosí
19:00	Ruiz 51', 69', 88'; Izazola 55'	Report		Stadium: Estadio Alfonso Lastras; Referee: Ángel Flores

23 September 2014 Second leg	UAT	3–3	San Luis	Ciudad Victoria, Tamaulipas
19:00	Ocampo 38'; Sánchez 58'; González 85'	Report	Franco 31'; Izazola 56' (pen.); Vizcarra 66'	Stadium: Estadio Marte R. Gómez; Attendance: 412; Referee: Jesús Guerrero

San Luis won the round 7–3 on aggregate

=== Group 3 ===
Pos	Team	Pld	W	D	L	RW	GF	GA	GD	Pts	
1	Guadalajara	6	4	0	2	2	11	6	+5	14	Group winner
2	Tepic	6	3	2	1	2	9	5	+4	13	
3	Tijuana	6	2	2	2	1	6	7	−1	9	
4	Zacatepec	6	1	0	5	0	4	12	−8	3	

Updated to match(es) played on unknown. Source:

==== Round 1 ====
29 July 2014 First leg	Guadalajara	3−1	Tepic	Zapopan, Jalisco
19:00	Nápoles 4', 12'; Fierro 55'	Report	Cisneros 79'	Stadium: Estadio Omnilife; Attendance: 8,020; Referee: León Vicente Barajas

12 August 2014 Second leg	Tepic	3−1	Guadalajara	Tepic, Nayarit
20:00	Bautista 16'; Hernández 40'; Pacheco 58'	Report	Solís 32'	Stadium: Arena Cora; Attendance: 10,600; Referee: Ángel Monroy Bello

Guadalajara and Tepic drew 4−4 on aggregate and both teams drew on away goals, thus neither team received the extra point

29 July 2014 First leg	Tijuana	3–1	Zacatepec	Tijuana, Baja California
19:00	Benedetto 23'; Corona 32'; Martín 53'	Report	Guzmán 29'	Stadium: Estadio Caliente; Attendance: 16,133; Referee: Erick Yair Miranda

5 August 2014 Second leg	Zacatepec	2–1	Tijuana	Cuernavaca, Morelos
19:00	Ramírez 11'; Hernández 65'	Report	Pellerano 32'	Stadium: Estadio Centenario; Attendance: Uriel Olvera; Referee: 1,950

Tijuana won the round 4–3 on aggregate

==== Round 2 ====
19 August 2014 First leg	Tepic	0–0	Tijuana	Tepic, Nayarit
20:00		Report		Stadium: Arena Cora; Attendance: 4,850; Referee: Baruch Absalón Castellanos

26 August 2014 Second leg	Tijuana	1–1	Tepic	Tijuana, Baja California
19:00	Arango 69'	Report	Mora 77'	Stadium: Estadio Caliente; Attendance: 16,833; Referee: Víctor Bisguerra Mendiola

Teams drew 1–1 on aggregate, Tepic won the round on away goals

20 August 2014 First leg	Guadalajara	2–1	Zacatepec	Zapopan, Jalisco
19:00	Hernández 17', 19'	Report	Pardini 32'	Stadium: Estadio Omnilife; Attendance: 3,219; Referee: Roberto Ríos

27 August 2014 Second leg	Zacatepec	0–2	Guadalajara	Zacatepec, Morelos
21:00		Report	Álvarez 36'; Toledo 49'	Stadium: Estadio Agustín Coruco Díaz; Referee: Fernando Hernández Gómez

Guadalajara won the round 4–1 on aggregate

==== Round 3 ====
16 September 2014 First leg	Guadalajara	3–0; Awarded	Tijuana	Zapopan, Jalisco
19:00	Pereira 22'; G. Hernández 74'	Report		Stadium: Estadio Omnilife; Referee: Miguel Chacón

24 September 2014 Second leg	Tijuana	1–0	Guadalajara	Tijuana, Baja California
19:00	Martín 41'	Report		Stadium: Estadio Caliente; Attendance: 25,333; Referee: León Vicente Barajas

The first leg originally ended 2–0 but Guadalajara was later awarded a 3–0 win after Tijuana only had 6 registered Liga MX players available for the leg instead of the mandatory 8.
Guadalajara won the round 3–1 on aggregate

16 September 2014 First leg	Tepic	2–0	Zacatepec	Tepic, Nayarit
20:00	Basulto 49'; Bautista 51'	Report		Stadium: Arena Cora; Attendance: 2,284; Referee: Adonai Escobedo González

24 September 2014 Second leg	Zacatepec	0–2	Tepic	Zacatepec, Morelos
19:00		Report	Mora 34'; Pacheco 90+3'	Stadium: Estadio Agustín "Coruco" Díaz; Referee: Jesús Bisguerra

Tepic won the round 4–0 on aggregate

=== Group 4 ===
Pos	Team	Pld	W	D	L	RW	GF	GA	GD	Pts	
1	Atlas	6	4	1	1	2	11	9	+2	15	Group winner
2	U. de G.	6	2	3	1	2	7	4	+3	11	
3	Zacatecas	6	1	2	3	0	4	6	−2	5	
4	Sinaloa	6	1	2	3	0	9	12	−3	5	

Updated to match(es) played on unknown. Source:

==== Round 1 ====
29 July 2014 First leg	Zacatecas	0−0	U. de G.	Zacatecas, Zacatecas
19:00		Report		Stadium: Estadio Francisco Villa; Attendance: 10,130; Referee: Oscar Villagómez

5 August 2014 Second leg	U. de G.	0−0	Zacatecas	Guadalajara, Jalisco
19:00		Report		Stadium: Estadio Jalisco; Attendance: 3,819; Referee: Miguel Ángel Flores

Zacatecas and U. de G. drew 0−0 on aggregate and tied on away goals, thus both teams did not receive the extra point

30 July 2014 First leg	Atlas	4−2	Sinaloa	Guadalajara, Jalisco
21:00	Medina 6'; Ramírez 32'; Barraza 48' (pen.); Barragán 63'	Report	Gómez 39'; Enríquez 82' (pen.)	Stadium: Estadio Jalisco; Attendance: 10,842; Referee: Oscar Macías

5 August 2014 Second leg	Sinaloa	2−2	Atlas	Culiacán, Sinaloa
20:00	López 26', 62'	Report	González 56'; Barraza 65'	Stadium: Estadio Banorte; Referee: Jesús Bisguerra Mendiola

Atlas won the round 6−4 on aggregate

==== Round 2 ====
19 August 2014 First leg	Zacatecas	1−2	Atlas	Zacatecas, Zacatecas
19:00	Argüelles 35'	Report	Barragán 28'; Ponce 90+3'	Stadium: Estadio Francisco Villa; Attendance: 13,480; Referee: Diego Montaño

27 August 2014 Second leg	Atlas	1−0	Zacatecas	Guadalajara, Jalisco
21:00	Barragán 86'	Report		Stadium: Estadio Jalisco; Attendance: 6,532; Referee: Miguel Ángel Ayala

Atlas won the round 3−1 on aggregate

19 August 2014 First leg	U. de G.	1−0	Sinaloa	Guadalajara, Jalisco
21:00	Martínez 61'	Report		Stadium: Estadio Jalisco; Attendance: 1,389; Referee: Erim Ramírez

26 August 2014 Second leg	Sinaloa	2−2	U. de G.	Culiacán, Sinaloa
20:00	Stringel 54'; Prieto 87'	Report	Cufré 71'; E. González 75'	Stadium: Estadio Banorte; Attendance: 3,829; Referee: Mario Alcántara

U. de G. won the round 3−2 on aggregate

==== Round 3 ====
16 September 2014 First leg	Sinaloa	2−1	Zacatecas	Culiacán, Sinaloa
20:00	Osorio 48'; Gómez 67'	Report	López 15'	Stadium: Estadio Banorte; Attendance: 3,712; Referee: Jonathan Hernández

23 September 2014 Second leg	Zacatecas	2−1	Sinaloa	Zacatecas, Zacatecas
19:00	Colón 38'; Cisneros 40'	Report	Rojas 49'	Stadium: Estadio Francisco Villa; Attendance: 3,400; Referee: Oscar Bernardo Villagómez

Sinaloa and Zacatecas drew 3−3 on aggregate and drew on away goals, thus neither team received the extra point

17 September 2014 First leg	U. de G.	1−2	Atlas	Guadalajara, Jalisco
21:00	Romo 10'	Report	Rivera 14'; Maikon Leite 75' (pen.)	Stadium: Estadio Jalisco; Referee: José Alfredo Peñaloza

24 September 2014 Second leg	Atlas	0−3	U. de G.	Guadalajara, Jalisco
21:00		Report	Ferreria 28'; Mendoza 69'; López 77'	Stadium: Estadio Jalisco; Attendance: 10,241; Referee: Paul Delgadillo

U. de G. won the round 4−2 on aggregate

=== Group 5 ===
Pos	Team	Pld	W	D	L	RW	GF	GA	GD	Pts	
1	Puebla	6	4	1	1	2	6	4	+2	15	Group winner
2	Morelia	6	2	3	1	2	11	6	+5	11	
3	Necaxa	6	2	3	1	1	6	4	+2	10	
4	Celaya	6	0	1	5	0	3	12	−9	1	

Updated to match(es) played on unknown. Source:

==== Round 1 ====
30 July 2014 First leg	Morelia	1–1	Necaxa	Morelia, Michoacán
19:00	Morales 43'	Report	Gallegos 64'	Stadium: Estadio Morelos; Attendance: 7,831; Referee: Eduardo Galván

5 August 2014 Second leg	Necaxa	1–1	Morelia	Aguascalientes, Aguascalientes
21:00	Orozco 23'	Report	Alaníz 90' (pen.)	Stadium: Estadio Victoria; Attendance: 5,733; Referee: Christian Ramírez

Morelia and Necaxa drew 1–1 on aggregate and tied on away goals, thus neither team received the extra point

30 July 2014 First leg	Celaya	0–1	Puebla	Celaya, Guanajuato
19:00		Report	Pérez 89'	Stadium: Estadio Miguel Alemán; Attendance: 3,200; Referee: Saúl Orozco

6 August 2014 Second leg	Puebla	2–0	Celaya	Puebla, Puebla
19:00	Loera 78' (o.g.); Loroña 80'	Report		Stadium: Estadio Cuauhtémoc; Attendance: 3,741; Referee: León Vicente Barajas

Puebla won the round 3–0 on aggregate

==== Round 2 ====
19 August 2014 First leg	Celaya	2–2	Morelia	Celaya, Guanajuato
21:00	Hernández 78'; Duarte 82'	Report	Depetris 8'; Zamorano 76'	Stadium: Estadio Miguel Alemán; Attendance: 1,200; Referee: Jonathan Hernández

27 August 2014 Second leg	Morelia	3–0	Celaya	Morelia, Michoacán
19:00	Depetris 16'; Aguirre 44', 61'	Report		Stadium: Estadio Morelos; Attendance: 4,657; Referee: Ricardo Arellano

Morelia won the round 5–2 on aggregate

20 August 2014 First leg	Puebla	1–0	Necaxa	Puebla, Puebla
19:00	Blanco 34' (pen.)	Report		Stadium: Estadio Cuauhtémoc; Attendance: 5,633; Referee: Ricardo Arellano

26 August 2014 Second leg	Necaxa	0–0	Puebla	Aguascalientes, Aguascalientes
19:00		Report		Stadium: Estadio Victoria; Attendance: 4,794; Referee: Ángel Flores Galicia

Puebla won the round 1–0 on aggregate

==== Round 3 ====
16 September 2014 First leg	Puebla	2–1	Morelia	Puebla, Puebla
19:00	Cacho 8'; Mejía 46'	Report	Pereira 4'	Stadium: Estadio Cuauhtémoc; Attendance: 4,896; Referee: Roberto Ríos Jácome

24 September 2014 Second leg	Morelia	3–0	Puebla	Morelia, Michoacán
19:00	Zárate 29'; Huiqui 45'; Depetris 64'	Report		Stadium: Estadio Morelos; Attendance: 3,674; Referee: Miguel Ángel Ayala

Morelia won the round 4–2 on aggregate

16 September 2014 First leg	Celaya	0–2	Necaxa	Celaya, Guanajuato
21:00		Report	Talancón 17'; Ornelas 83'	Stadium: Estadio Miguel Alemán; Attendance: 1,351; Referee: Diego Montaño

24 September 2014 Second leg	Necaxa	2–1	Celaya	Aguascalientes, Aguascalientes
21:00	Tata 10'; Gorocito 45'	Report	Duarte 78'	Stadium: Estadio Victoria; Referee: Saúl Orozco

Necaxa won the round 4–1 on aggregate

=== Group 6 ===
Pos	Team	Pld	W	D	L	RW	GF	GA	GD	Pts	
1	Mérida	6	4	2	0	3	9	5	+4	17	Group winner
2	Toluca	6	3	2	1	2	12	8	+4	13	Best runner-up
3	UNAM	6	1	2	3	1	9	11	−2	6	
4	Atlante	6	0	2	4	0	6	12	−6	2	

Updated to match(es) played on unknown. Source:

==== Round 1 ====
30 July 2014 First leg	Mérida	2–1	Toluca	Mérida, Yucatán
19:00	Martín 49'; Polo 80'	Report	Benítez 74'	Stadium: Estadio Carlos Iturralde; Attendance: 10,207; Referee: Baruch Absalón

6 August 2014 Second leg	Toluca	1–1	Mérida	Toluca, Estado de México
19:00	Acosta 17'	Report	Martín 60'	Stadium: Estadio Nemesio Díez; Attendance: 6,453; Referee: Erick Yair Miranda

Mérida won the round 3–2 on aggregate

30 July 2014 First leg	UNAM	1–1	Atlante	Distrito Federal
19:00	Herrera 41'	Report	Guadarrama 31'	Stadium: Estadio Olímpico Universitario; Attendance: 7,556; Referee: Jorge Isaac Rojas

5 August 2014 Second leg	Atlante	2–3	UNAM	Cancún, Quintana Roo
21:00	Hachen 2'; Guadarrama 87' (pen.)	Report	Herrera 12', 38'; Quintana 36'	Stadium: Estadio Andrés Quintana Roo; Attendance: 6,800; Referee: Diego Montaño

UNAM won the round 4–3 on aggregate

==== Round 2 ====
19 August 2014 First leg	Toluca	3–2	Atlante	Toluca, Estado de México
19:00	Silva 13'; Orrantía 45'; Bueno 62'	Report	Mina 34', 66'	Stadium: Estadio Nemesio Díez; Attendance: 6,036; Referee: Eduardo Galván

26 August 2014 Second leg	Atlante	0–3	Toluca	Cancún, Quintana Roo
19:00		Report	Benítez 31', 61', 82'	Stadium: Estadio Andrés Quintana Roo; Attendance: 1,556; Referee: Arturo Cruz

Toluca won the round 6–2 on aggregate

19 August 2014 First leg	Mérida	2–1	UNAM	Mérida, Yucatán
21:00	Polo 64'; Acuña 85'	Report	Herrera 72' (pen.)	Stadium: Estadio Carlos Iturralde; Attendance: 12,523; Referee: Arturo Cruz

27 August 2014 Second leg	UNAM	1–2	Mérida	Distrito Federal
21:00	Sosa 38'	Report	Briceño 77'; Martín 78'	Stadium: Estadio Olímpico Universitario; Attendance: 4,838; Referee: Roberto Ríos

Mérida won the round 4–2 on aggregate

==== Round 3 ====
16 September 2014 First leg	Mérida	1–0	Atlante	Mérida, Yucatán
19:00	Acuña 76'	Report		Stadium: Estadio Carlos Iturralde; Attendance: 3,163; Referee: Ángel Monroy

23 September 2014 Second leg	Atlante	1–1	Mérida	Cancún, Quintana Roo
19:00	Cámara 90+2'	Report	Briceño 85'	Stadium: Estadio Andrés Quintana Roo; Attendance: 1,912; Referee: Mario Alcántara

Mérida won the round 2–1 on aggregate

16 September 2014 First leg	Toluca	2–2	UNAM	Toluca, Estado de México
21:00	Amione 20'; Orrantía 24'	Report	Gallardo 56'; Nieto 90+3'	Stadium: Estadio Nemesio Díez; Referee: Víctor Bisguerra

23 September 2014 Second leg	UNAM	1–2	Toluca	Distrito Federal
21:00	Dutari 26'	Report	Amione 34' (pen.), 64'	Stadium: Estadio Olímpico Universitario; Referee: Miguel Ángel Flores

Toluca won the round 4–3 on aggregate

=== Group 7 ===
Pos	Team	Pld	W	D	L	RW	GF	GA	GD	Pts	
1	BUAP	6	2	4	0	2	9	6	+3	12	Group winner
2	Oaxaca	6	2	2	2	1	9	8	+1	9	
3	Veracruz	6	1	3	2	2	8	9	−1	8	
4	Chiapas	6	1	3	2	1	6	9	−3	7	

Updated to match(es) played on unknown. Source:

==== Round 1 ====
29 July 2014 First leg	BUAP	4−2	Chiapas	Puebla, Puebla
19:00	Castillo 26'; Vázquez 28', 51'; Juárez 45+1'	Report	Armenteros 52'; Pérez 71'	Stadium: Estadio Universitario BUAP; Attendance: 3,792; Referee: Jesús Guerrero

6 August 2014 Second leg	Chiapas	0−0	BUAP	Tuxtla Gutiérrez, Chiapas
21:00		Report		Stadium: Estadio Víctor Manuel Reyna; Attendance: 10,653; Referee: Víctor Bisguerra

Lobos BUAP won the round 4−2 on aggregate

30 July 2014 First leg	Veracruz	1−2	Oaxaca	Veracruz, Veracruz
19:00	Quiñones 45+1'	Report	Calderón 39'; Santoya 83' (pen.)	Stadium: Estadio Luis "Pirata" Fuente; Attendance: 4,532; Referee: Luis Enrique Santander

6 August 2014 Second leg	Oaxaca	2−3	Veracruz	Oaxaca, Oaxaca
19:00	Cancela 30' (o.g.); Iturbide 88' (pen.)	Report	Cerda 17' (o.g.); Mañón 25', 61'	Stadium: Estadio Benito Juárez; Attendance: 5,459; Referee: Mario Alcántara

Veracruz and Oaxaca drew 4−4 on aggregate, Veracruz won the round on away goals

==== Round 2 ====
19 August 2014 First leg	Chiapas	0−0	Oaxaca	Tuxtla Gutiérrez, Chiapas
19:00		Report		Stadium: Estadio Víctor Manuel Reyna; Attendance: 5,920; Referee: Jorge Isaac Rojas

27 August 2014 Second leg	Oaxaca	2−0	Chiapas	Oaxaca, Oaxaca
19:00	Calderón 74'; Santoya 82'	Report		Stadium: Estadio Benito Juárez; Referee: Adonaí Escobedo González

Oaxaca won the round 2−0 on aggregate

20 August 2014 First leg	Veracruz	0−0	BUAP	Veracruz, Veracruz
21:00		Report		Stadium: Estadio Luis "Pirata" Fuente; Attendance: 3,890; Referee: Erick Yair Miranda

26 August 2014 Second leg	BUAP	1−1	Veracruz	Puebla, Puebla
19:00	Piñón 83'	Report	Perales 37'	Stadium: Estadio Universitario BUAP; Attendance: 2,481; Referee: Uriel Olvera Ríos

Teams drew 1−1 on aggregate, Veracruz won the round on away goals

==== Round 3 ====
17 September 2014 First leg	Oaxaca	1−1	BUAP	Oaxaca, Oaxaca
19:00	Santoya 81'	Report	Vázquez 50' (pen.)	Stadium: Estadio Benito Juárez; Referee: Fernando Hernández

23 September 2014 Second leg	BUAP	3−2	Oaxaca	Puebla, Puebla
19:00	Álvarez 56'; Piñón 70', 90+3'	Report	Santoya 17', 79'	Stadium: Estadio Universitario BUAP; Attendance: 1,872; Referee: Diego Montaño Robles

BUAP won the round 4−3 on aggregate

17 September 2014 First leg	Chiapas	3−2	Veracruz	Tuxtla Gutiérrez, Chiapas
21:00	Díaz 9' (pen.), 45+1' (pen.), 65'	Report	Andrade 2'; Sánchez 26'	Stadium: Estadio Víctor Manuel Reyna; Attendance: 2,648; Referee: Miguel Ángel Flores

23 September 2014 Second leg	Veracruz	1−1	Chiapas	Veracruz, Veracruz
21:00	Borja 46'	Report	Cervantes 31'	Stadium: Estadio Luis "Pirata" Fuente; Referee: Eduardo Galván Basulto

Chiapas won the round 4−3 on aggregate

=== Ranking of runners-up clubs ===
The best runner-up advances to the Championship Stage. If two or more teams are equal on points on completion of the group matches, the following criteria are applied to determine the rankings:

1. superior goal difference;
2. higher number of goals scored;
3. higher number of goals scored away;
4. best position in the Relegation table;
5. fair play ranking;
6. drawing of lots.

Pos	Grp	Team	Pld	W	D	L	RW	GF	GA	GD	Pts	
1	6	Toluca	6	3	2	1	2	12	8	+4	13	Best runner-up
2	3	Tepic	6	3	2	1	2	9	5	+4	13	
3	5	Morelia	6	2	3	1	2	11	6	+5	11	
4	2	San Luis	6	2	3	1	2	11	6	+5	11	
5	4	U. de G.	6	2	3	1	2	7	4	+3	11	
6	7	Oaxaca	6	2	2	2	1	9	8	+1	9	
7	1	Querétaro	6	2	1	3	2	7	7	0	9	

Updated to match(es) played on unknown. Source:

== Championship stage ==
The eight clubs that advance to this stage will be ranked and seeded 1 to 8. In case of ties, the same tiebreakers used to rank the runners-up will be used.

In this stage, all the rounds will be a one-off match. If the game ends in a tie, there will proceed to penalty shootouts directly.

The venue will be determined as follows:

- The highest seeded club will host the match, regardless of the division the clubs are in.

=== Seeding ===
Seed	Team	Pld	W	D	L	RW	GF	GA	GD	Pts
1	Mérida	6	4	2	0	3	9	5	+4	17
2	UANL	6	4	0	2	3	10	5	+5	15
3	Santos Laguna	6	4	1	1	2	12	9	+3	15
4	Atlas	6	4	1	1	2	11	9	+2	15
5	Puebla	6	4	1	1	2	6	4	+2	15
6	Guadalajara	6	4	0	2	2	11	6	+5	14
7	Toluca	6	3	2	1	2	12	8	+4	13
8	BUAP	6	2	4	0	2	9	6	+3	12

Updated to match(es) played on unknown. Source:

=== Bracket ===
Quarterfinals
2	UANL	2
7	Toluca	0
3	Santos Laguna	5
6	Guadalajara	0
4	Atlas	0 (3)
5	Puebla	0 (4)
1	Mérida	1
8	BUAP	3

Semifinals
2	UANL	2
3	Santos Laguna	4
5	Puebla	1 (5)
8	BUAP	1 (4)

Final
3	Santos Laguna	2 (4)
5	Puebla	2 (2)

=== Quarterfinals ===
21 October 2014
19:00

Mérida	1−3	BUAP
Morales 61'	Report	Tejada 71'; Guzmán 81'; Jiménez 90' (pen.)

Estadio Carlos Iturralde, Mérida
Attendance: 1,417
Referee: Ángel Monroy Bello

21 October 2014
21:15

Santos Laguna	5−0	Guadalajara
Orozco 5', 13'; Rodríguez 20' (pen.); Djaniny 78'; Calderón 90+2'	Report

Estadio Corona, Torreón
Attendance: 10,859
Referee: Luis Enrique Santander

22 October 2014
19:00

Atlas	0−0	Puebla
	Report
Penalties
Millar (penalty missed); Esqueda (penalty scored); Vilar (penalty missed); González (penalty scored); Maikon Leite (penalty scored); Ponce (penalty missed)	3−4	(penalty missed) Pajoy; (penalty missed) Esqueda; (penalty scored) de Luna; (penalty scored) Loroña; (penalty scored) Blanco; (penalty scored) Frausto

Estadio Jalisco, Guadalajara
Attendance: 12,812
Referee: Erick Miranda

22 October 2014
21:15

UANL	2−0	Toluca
Torres 56'; Arévalo Ríos 60'	Report

Estadio Universitario, San Nicolás de los Garza
Attendance: Oscar Macías

=== Semifinals ===
28 October 2014
21:00

Puebla	1−1	BUAP
Loroña 76'	Report	Tejada 31'
Penalties
Pajoy (penalty scored) de luna (penalty scored); Torres (penalty scored); Loroña (penalty scored); Blanco (penalty scored)	5−4	(penalty scored) Tejada; (penalty scored) Ibarra; (penalty scored) Jiménez; (penalty scored) Guzmán; (penalty missed) Vázquez

Estadio Cuauhtémoc, Puebla
Attendance: 19,366
Referee: César Ramos

29 October 2014
21:00

UANL	2−4	Santos Laguna
Álvarez 9'; Orozco 12' (o.g.)	Report	Djaniny 35'; Rentería 41'; Alanís 60'; Orozco 65'

Estadio Universitario, San Nicolás de los Garza
Attendance: 41,203
Referee: Fernando Guerrero

=== Final ===
4 November 2014
21:00

Santos Laguna	2–2	Puebla
Rentería 35'; Calderón 76'	Report	Pajoy 71'; Noriega 89'
Penalties
Rodríguez (penalty scored); Alanís (penalty scored); Calderón (penalty scored); Djaniny (penalty scored)	4−2	(penalty scored) Pajoy; (penalty scored) Pérez; (penalty missed) Acosta; (penalty missed) Torres

Estadio Corona, Torreón
Attendance: 21,154
Referee: César Ramos

== Top goalscorers ==
Players and teams in bold are still active in the competition

Rank	Player	Club	Goals
1	(Colombia) Andrés Rentería	Santos Laguna	6
2	(Colombia) Danny Santoya	Oaxaca	5
2	(Cape Verde) Djaniny	Santos Laguna	5
4
4	(Paraguay) Édgar Benítez	Toluca	4
4	(Mexico) Eduardo Herrera	UNAM	4
4	(Brazil) Ricardo Jesus	Querétaro	4
4	(Colombia) Dorlan Pabón	Monterrey	4
8			4
8	(Mexico) Jerónimo Amione	Toluca	3
8	(Mexico) Martín Barragán	Atlas	3
8	(Mexico) Néstor Calderón	Santos Laguna	3
8	(Chile) Isaac Díaz	Chiapas	3
8	(Slovakia) David Depetris	Morelia	3
8	(Mexico) Giovanni Hernández	Guadalajara	3
8	(Mexico) Freddy Martín	Mérida	3
8	(Mexico) Javier Orozco	Santos Laguna	3
8	(Mexico) Marvin Piñón	BUAP	3
8	(Mexico) Fausto Ruíz	San Luis	3
8	(Mexico) Michel Vázquez	BUAP	3

Source: LigaMX.net
