= Clausura 2014 Copa MX =

Tournament details
- Country: Mexico
- Teams: 24

Final positions
- Champions: Tigres UANL (3rd title)
- Runners-up: Oaxaca

Tournament statistics
- Matches played: 79
- Goals scored: 208 (2.63 per match)
- Top goal scorer(s): Alan Pulido (9 goals)

The Copa 2014 MX Clausura was the 71st staging of the Copa MX, the 44th staging in the professional era and is the fourth tournament played since the 1996–97 edition.

This tournament started on January 14, 2014, and concluded on April 9, 2014. The winner was Tigres and he was scheduled to face Monarcas Morelia, who won the Apertura 2013 edition, in a home-to-home series on July 9 and 12 to qualify as Mexico 3 to the 2015 Copa Libertadores.

== Participants Clausura 2014 ==
Location of the participating Liga MX teams
Brown: Group 1; Orange: Group 2; Yellow: Group 3; Green: Group 4; Blue: Group 5; Purple: Group 6
Location of the participating Ascenso MX teams
Brown: Group 1; Orange: Group 2; Yellow: Group 3; Green: Group 4; Blue: Group 5; Purple: Group 6

This tournament featured the clubs from the Liga MX who did not participate in the 2013-14 CONCACAF Champions League (Tijuana, Toluca, América and Cruz Azul), and the teams who participated in the 2014 Copa Libertadores (León, Santos Laguna and Morelia) did not participate as well. The first 13 Ascenso MX teams in the classification phase during the Apertura 2013 season participated.

== Tiebreakers ==
If two or more clubs are equal on points on completion of the group matches, the following criteria are applied to determine the rankings:

1. superior goal difference;
2. higher number of goals scored;
3. scores of the group matches played among the clubs in question;
4. higher number of goals scored away in the group matches played among the clubs in question;
5. best position in the Relegation table;
6. fair play ranking;
7. drawing of lots.

== Group stage ==
Every group is composed by four clubs, two from Liga MX and two from Ascenso MX. Instead of a traditional robin-round schedule, the clubs will play in three two-legged "rounds", the last one being contested by clubs of the same league.

Each win gives a club 3 points, each draw gives 1 point. An extra point is awarded for every round won; a round is won by aggregated score, and if it is a tie, the extra point will be awarded to the team with higher number of goals scored away.

Key to colours in group tables
Group winners advance to the Championship Stage
The two best second-placed teams also advance to the Championship Stage

All times are UTC-05:00

=== Group 1 ===
Pos	Team	Pld	W	D	L	RW	GF	GA	GD	Pts	
1	Monterrey	6	4	0	2	2	12	6	+6	14	Group winner
2	Pachuca	6	3	2	1	2	10	6	+4	13	Best runners-up
3	Altamira	6	1	2	3	0	4	8	−4	5	
4	Cruz Azul Hidalgo	6	0	4	2	1	3	9	−6	5	

Updated to match(es) played on unknown. Source:
January 14, 2014
21:00

Monterrey	1−0	Altamira
Arce 45'	Report

Estadio Tecnológico,
Monterrey, Nuevo Leon
Attendance: 11,562
Referee: Víctor Bisguerra Mendiola
January 22, 2014
19:00

Altamira	1−3	Monterrey
M. Cruz 64'	Report	Juárez 47' de Jesús 79'; Ramírez 84'

Estadio Altamira,
Altamira, Tamaulipas
Attendance: 3,021
Referee: Arturo Cruz Hurtado

Monterrey won the round 4−1 on aggregate

January 15, 2014
19:00

Pachuca	1−1	Cruz Azul Hidalgo
Pérez 75'	Report	Valdez 87' (pen.)

Estadio Hidalgo,
Pachuca, Hidalgo
Attendance: 8,472
Referee: Roberto Ríos
January 21, 2014
15:00

Cruz Azul Hidalgo	1−1	Pachuca
Lara 90+2'	Report	Ayala 81'

Estadio 10 de Diciembre,
Jasso, Hidalgo
Referee: Baruch Absalón Castellanos

Cruz Azul Hidalgo and Pachuca drew 2–2 on aggregate and both tied on away goals, thus neither team received the extra point

February 4, 2014
15:00

Cruz Azul Hidalgo	0−2	Monterrey
	Report	Llanes 47'; Arce 70'

Estadio 10 de Diciembre,
Jasso, Hidalgo
Referee: Uriel Olvera
February 19, 2014
21:00

Monterrey	4−0	Cruz Azul Hidalgo
Briceño 18'; Morelo 21', 38'; García 51'	Report

Estadio Tecnológico,
Monterrey, Nuevo Leon
Attendance: 9,781
Referee: Oscar Macías

Monterrey won the round 6−0 on aggregate

February 5, 2014
19:00

Pachuca	0−1	Altamira
	Report	É. Cruz 76'

Estadio Hidalgo,
Pachuca, Hidalgo
Attendance: 6,521
Referee: Oscar Macías Romo
February 19, 2014
19:00

Altamira	1−3	Pachuca
Rocha 62'	Report	Esqueda 8', 18'; Rojas 25' (o.g.)

Estadio Altamira,
Altamira, Tamaulipas
Attendance: 2,521
Referee: Mauricio Martínez

Pachuca won the round 3−2 on aggregate

February 25, 2014
15:00

Cruz Azul Hidalgo	0−0	Altamira
	Report

Estadio 10 de Diciembre,
Jasso, Hidalgo
Referee: Jonathan Hernández Juárez
March 11, 2014
19:00

Altamira	1−1	Cruz Azul Hidalgo
Rocha 35'	Report	Fernández 12'

Estadio Altamira,
Altamira, Tamaulipas
Attendance: 1,033
Referee: Mario Alcántara

Teams drew 1−1 on aggregate, Cruz Azul Hidalgo won the round on away goals

February 26, 2014
21:00

Monterrey	2−3	Pachuca
Morelo 65'; López 78'	Report	Andrade 37' (pen.); Lozano 47' de Buen 90+2'

Estadio Tecnológico,
Monterrey, Nuevo Leon
Attendance: 10,439
Referee: Miguel Ángel Ayala
March 11, 2014
21:00

Pachuca	2−0	Monterrey
Andrade 42' (pen.); Lozano 89'	Report

Estadio Hidalgo,
Pachuca, Hidalgo
Attendance: 8,145
Referee: Antony Zanjuampa

Pachuca won the round 5−2 on aggregate

=== Group 2 ===
Pos	Team	Pld	W	D	L	RW	GF	GA	GD	Pts	
1	UANL	6	4	2	0	3	20	2	+18	17	Group winner
2	Puebla	6	2	2	2	1	7	12	−5	9	
3	UAT	6	1	2	3	1	5	8	−3	6	
4	San Luis	6	1	2	3	1	2	12	−10	6	

Updated to match(es) played on unknown. Source:
January 14, 2014
19:00

UAT	4−1	Puebla
Pacheco 5'; Nurse 12'; Rosas 22'; Villalobos 84' (o.g.)	Report	Guzmán 18'

Estadio Marte R. Gómez
Ciudad Victoria, Tamaulipas
Referee: Jonathan Hernández
January 21, 2013
19:00

Puebla	1−0	UAT
Martínez 58'	Report

Estadio Cuauhtémoc
Puebla, Puebla
Attendance: 5,447
Referee: Luis Enrique Santander

UAT won the round 4−2 on aggregate

January 14, 2014
21:00

San Luis	0−1	UANL
	Report	Torres Mezzell 6'

Estadio Alfonso Lastras
San Luis Potosí, San Luis Potosí
Attendance: 9,450
Referee: Jesús Bisguerra
January 22, 2014
21:00

UANL	6−1	San Luis
Pulido 4', 29'; Pacheco 24'; Lobos 61'; Álvarez 79'; Danilinho 88' (pen.)	Report	Stringel 67'

Estadio Universitario
San Nicolás de los Garza, Nuevo León
Attendance: 27,897
Referee: Erick Miranda

UANL won the round 7−1 on aggregate

February 4, 2014
21:00

UANL	4−0	UAT
Rivas 45'; Herrera 78', 86' (pen.); Pulido 82' (pen.)	Report

Estadio Universitario
San Nicolás de los Garza, Nuevo León
Attendance: 29,021
Referee: Antony Zanjuampa Rojo
February 18, 2014
21:00

UAT	1−1	UANL
Nurse 69'	Report	Torres Nilo 64'

Estadio Marte R. Gómez
Ciudad Victoria, Tamaulipas
Attendance: 9,848
Referee: Marco Antonio Ortiz

UANL won the round 5−1 on aggregate

February 6, 2014
21:00

San Luis	0−5	Puebla
	Report	Tamay 27', 56'; Bella 47'; Martínez 85'; Juraidini 89'

Estadio Alfonso Lastras
San Luis Potosí, San Luis Potosí
Referee: Emerson Zamora
February 18, 2014
19:00

Puebla	0−0	San Luis
	Report

Estadio Cuauhtémoc
Puebla, Puebla
Attendance: 24,636
Referee: Víctor Bisguerra

Puebla won the round 5−0 on aggregate

February 25, 2014
19:00

San Luis	0−0	UAT
	Report

Estadio Alfonso Lastras
San Luis Potosí, San Luis Potosí
Referee: Mauricio Martínez Figueroa
March 11, 2014
21:00

UAT	0−1	San Luis
	Report	Clemens 29'

Estadio Marte R. Gómez
Ciudad Victoria, Tamaulipas
Attendance: 1,469
Referee: Arturo Cruz Hurtado

San Luis on the round 1−0 on aggregate

February 26, 2014
21:00

UANL	8−0	Puebla
Juninho 4'; Herrera 10', 38', 77'; Pizarro 23'; Pulido 36', 41'; Burbano 88'	Report

Estadio Universitario
San Nicolás de los Garza, Nuevo León
Attendance: 33,245
Referee: Jesús Fabricio Morales
March 13, 2014
19:00

Puebla	0−0	UANL
	Report

Estadio Cuauhtémoc
Puebla, Puebla
Attendance: 5,826
Referee: Miguel Ángel Ayala

UANL won the round 8−0 on aggregate

=== Group 3 ===
Pos	Team	Pld	W	D	L	RW	GF	GA	GD	Pts	
1	Oaxaca	6	4	1	1	3	10	3	+7	16	Group winner
2	Veracruz	6	3	2	1	2	9	2	+7	13	Best runners-up
3	BUAP	6	2	1	3	0	3	11	−8	7	
4	Chiapas	6	1	0	5	1	6	12	−6	4	

Updated to match(es) played on unknown. Source:
January 14, 2014
19:00

BUAP	0−4	Veracruz
	Report	Borja 28'; Cid 33'; Moreno 68'; Martínez 72'

Estadio Universitario BUAP,
Puebla, Puebla
Attendance: 14,287
Referee: Jorge Delgado
January 21, 2014
19:00

Veracruz	0−0	BUAP
	Report

Estadio Luis "Pirata" Fuente,
Veracruz, Veracruz
Attendance: 3,600
Referee: Miguel Ángel Chacón

Veracruz won the round 4−0 on aggregate

January 15, 2014
19:00

Chiapas	2−4	Oaxaca
Zúñiga 76'; Romero 87'	Report	Santoya 17'; Sandez 27'; D. Martínez 63'; Calderón 80'

Estadio Víctor Manuel Reyna,
Tuxtla Gutiérrez, Chiapas
Attendance: 1,080
Referee: Antony Zanjuampa Rojo
January 22, 2014
19:00

Oaxaca	1−0	Chiapas
Padilla 26'	Report

Estadio Benito Juárez,
Oaxaca, Oaxaca
Attendance: 3,022
Referee: Marco Ortiz

Oaxaca won the round 5−2 on aggregate

February 4, 2014
19:00

BUAP	1−3	Chiapas
Piñón 56'	Report	Zúñiga 3'; Pires 68'; Trejo 90+2'

Estadio Universitario BUAP,
Puebla, Puebla
Attendance: 8,534
Referee: Jonathan Hernández
February 18, 2014
19:00

Chiapas	0−1	BUAP
	Report	Cervantes 90+1'

Estadio Víctor Manuel Reyna,
Tuxtla Gutiérrez, Chiapas
Referee: Erick Miranda

Chiapas won the round 3−2 on aggregate

February 4, 2014
21:00

Veracruz	0−0	Oaxaca
	Report

Estadio Luis "Pirata" Fuente,
Veracruz, Veracruz
Attendance: 1,428
Referee: Miguel Ángel Ayala
February 19, 2014
19:00

Oaxaca	1−0	Veracruz
Calderón 90'	Report

Estadio Benito Juárez,
Oaxaca, Oaxaca
Attendance: 3,205
Referee: Mario Alcántara

Oaxaca won the round 1−0 on aggregate

February 25, 2014
19:00

BUAP	1−0	Oaxaca
Cercado 44'	Report

Estadio Universitario BUAP,
Puebla, Puebla
Referee: Jesús Bisguerra
March 11, 2014
19:00

Oaxaca	4−0	BUAP
Granados 4'; San Román 18'; Cuellar 29'; Moreno 51'	Report

Estadio Benito Juárez,
Oaxaca, Oaxaca
Referee: Fernando Hernández Gómez

Oaxaca won the round 4−1 on aggregate

February 26, 2014
21:00

Veracruz	3−0	Chiapas
Reyna 10', 22'; Borja 39'	Report

Estadio Luis "Pirata" Fuente,
Veracruz, Veracruz
Attendance: 12,324
Referee: Luis Enrique Santander
March 12, 2014
19:00

Chiapas	1−2	Veracruz
Cruz 75'	Report	Jiménez 21'; Mañón 90+1' (pen.)

Estadio Víctor Manuel Reyna,
Tuxtla Gutiérrez, Chiapas
Attendance: 1,083
Referee: Víctor Bisguerra

Veracruz won the round 5−1 on aggregate

=== Group 4 ===
Pos	Team	Pld	W	D	L	RW	GF	GA	GD	Pts	
1	Atlante	6	2	3	1	2	8	6	+2	11	Group winner
2	UNAM	6	2	2	2	2	10	7	+3	10	
3	Mérida	6	3	0	3	1	7	7	0	10	
4	Delfines	6	2	1	3	0	8	13	−5	7	

Updated to match(es) played on unknown. Source:
January 15, 2014
19:00

Mérida	1−0	Atlante
Martín 86'	Report

Estadio Carlos Iturralde,
Mérida, Yucatán
Attendance: 2,946
Referee: Obed Eliud Gómez
January 22, 2014
21:00

Atlante	2−0	Mérida
Sepúlveda 24'; García 31'	Report

Estadio Andrés Quintana Roo,
Cancún, Quintana Roo
Attendance: 4,010
Referee: Ricardo Ríos Jácome

Atlante won the round 2−1 on aggregate

January 16, 2014
21:00

Delfines	3−2	UNAM
López 15'; Cleiton Silva 40'; Vázquez 48'	Report	Ramírez 27', 56' (pen.)

Unidad Deportiva del Campus II,
Ciudad del Carmen, Campeche
Attendance: 11,440
Referee: Mauricio Martínez
January 21, 2014
21:00

UNAM	3−0	Delfines
Bravo 3'; López 37'; Fuentes 50'	Report

Estadio Olímpico Universitario,
Coyoacán, Distrito Federal
Attendance: 5,428
Referee: Ricardo Arellano

UNAM won the round 5−3 on aggregate

February 4, 2014
19:00

Delfines	1−1	Atlante
Vázquez 90+3' (pen.)	Report	Sepúlveda 50' (pen.)

Unidad Deportiva del Campus II,
Ciudad del Carmen, Campeche
Attendance: 1,834
Referee: León Vicente Barajas
February 18, 2014
19:00

Atlante	3−2	Delfines
Rodríguez 6', 41', 58'	Report	Vázquez 52'; Apodi 75'

Estadio Andrés Quintana Roo,
Cancún, Quintana Roo
Referee: Antony Zanjuampa

Atlante won the round 4−3 on aggregate

February 5, 2014
21:00

Mérida	1−0	UNAM
Strahman 44' (pen.)	Report

Estadio Carlos Iturralde,
Mérida, Yucatán
Attendance: 10,254
Referee: Oscar Bernardo Villagómez
February 18, 2014
21:00

UNAM	3−1	Mérida
Espinoza 18'; Lagos 61'; Morales 82'	Report	Strahman 39'

Estadio Olímpico Universitario,
Coyoacán, Distrito Federal
Referee: Miguel Ángel Ayala Ramírez

UNAM won the round 3−2 on aggregate

February 25, 2014
19:00

Delfines	0−4	Mérida
	Report	Strahman 43', 55', 67'; Atilano 69'

Unidad Deportiva del Campus II,
Ciudad del Carmen, Campeche
Referee: Quetzalli Alvarado
March 11, 2014
19:00

Mérida	0−2	Delfines
	Report	Echavarría 30'; Vázquez 35' (pen.)

Estadio Carlos Iturralde,
Mérida, Yucatán
Attendance: 1,866
Referee: Emerson Zamora

Mérida won the round 4−2 on aggregate

February 25, 2014
21:00

Atlante	1−1	UNAM
Acosta 62'	Report	Nieto 87'

Estadio Andrés Quintana Roo,
Cancún, Quintana Roo
Referee: José Alfredo Peñaloza
March 13, 2014
21:00

UNAM	1−1	Atlante
Leandro Augusto 88'	Report	Morales 21'

Estadio Olímpico Universitario,
Coyoacán, Distrito Federal
Referee: Oscar Macías

Teams drew 2−2 on aggregate and both drew on away goals, thus neither team received the extra point.

=== Group 5 ===
Pos	Team	Pld	W	D	L	RW	GF	GA	GD	Pts	
1	Querétaro	6	3	1	2	3	10	7	+3	13	Group winner
2	Celaya	6	3	2	1	2	10	7	+3	13	
3	Necaxa	6	1	3	2	1	6	10	−4	7	
4	Atlas	6	1	2	3	0	6	8	−2	5	

Updated to match(es) played on unknown. Source:
- In the group matches played by Querétaro and Celaya, Querétaro won 3−2 on aggregate. Article 8 of the Copa MX regulations states if two teams have the same goal differential and the same number of goals scored, the aggregate score of the group matches played among the clubs is the tiebreaker, thus Querétaro won the group.
January 14, 2014
21:00

Atlas	1−1	Necaxa
Barragán 27'	Report	Isijara 7' (pen.)

Estadio Jalisco,
Guadalajara, Jalisco
Attendance: 5,208
Referee: Erick Yair Miranda
January 22, 2014
21:00

Necaxa	1−0	Atlas
Isijara 77'	Report

Estadio Victoria,
Aguascalientes, Aguascalientes
Attendance: 9,212
Referee: Diego Montaño

Necaxa won the round 2−1 on aggregate

January 15, 2014
21:00

Celaya	1−3	Querétaro
L. Hernández 90+3'	Report	Guastavino 31', 58'; Guajardo 63'

Estadio Miguel Alemán,
Celaya, Guanajuato
Attendance: 6,016
Referee: Fernando Hernández
January 21, 2014
21:00

Querétaro	0−1	Celaya
	Report	J. Hernández 30'

Estadio Corregidora,
Querétaro, Querétaro
Attendance: 4,077
Referee: Víctor Bisguerra

Querétaro won the round 3−2 on aggregate

February 4, 2014
19:00

Necaxa	2−2	Querétaro
Gonclaves 67'; Isijara 88'	Report	Guajardo 60'; Velasco 81'

Estadio Victoria,
Aguascalientes, Aguascalientes
Attendance: 4,037
Referee: Quetzalli Alvarado Godinez
February 18, 2014
19:00

Querétaro	2−0	Necaxa
Romo 35'; Corral 85'	Report

Estadio Corregidora,
Querétaro, Querétaro
Attendance: 3,258
Referee: Francisco Chacón

Querétaro won the round 4−2 on aggregate

February 4, 2014
21:00

Celaya	2−2	Atlas
L. Hernández 6'; González 81'	Report	Barraza 56'; Leyva 90+2'

Estadio Miguel Alemán,
Celaya, Guanajuato
Referee: Ángel Monroy Bello
February 18, 2014
21:00

Atlas	0−1	Celaya
	Report	Alvarado 27'

Estadio Jalisco,
Guadalajara, Jalisco
Attendance: 2,956
Referee: Roberto Ríos Jácome

Celaya won the round 3−2 on aggregate

February 25, 2014
21:00

Atlas	3−2	Querétaro
Santos 24'; Barraza 52', 90+3'	Report	Escalante 37'; Vilchis 55'

Estadio Jalisco,
Guadalajara, Jalisco
Attendance: 7,336
Referee: Antony Zanjuampa
March 11, 2014
21:00

Querétaro	1−0	Atlas
Romo 40'	Report

Estadio Corregidora,
Querétaro, Querétaro
Attendance: 4,407
Referee: Erim Ramírez

Teams drew 3−3 on aggregate, Querétaro won on away goals

February 26, 2014
19:00

Celaya	4−1	Necaxa
Cuevas 33'; Leandro Carrijó 54'; Estrella 79'; García 84'	Report	Kaká 69'

Estadio Miguel Alemán,
Celaya, Guanajuato
Attendance: 1,590
Referee: Miguel Alemán Valdés
March 12, 2014
19:00

Necaxa	1−1	Celaya
Guadarrama 89' (pen.)	Report	López 46' (o.g.)

Estadio Victoria,
Aguascalientes, Aguascalientes
Attendance: 9,743
Referee: Marco Antonio Ortiz

Celaya won the round 5−2 on aggregate

=== Group 6 ===
Pos	Team	Pld	W	D	L	RW	GF	GA	GD	Pts	
1	Sinaloa	6	4	0	2	2	9	6	+3	14	Group winner
2	Guadalajara	6	2	2	2	1	6	6	0	9	
3	Estudiantes Tecos	6	2	1	3	2	8	10	−2	9	
4	U. de G.	6	2	1	3	1	5	6	−1	8	

Updated to match(es) played on unknown. Source:
January 14, 2014
19:00

Estudiantes Tecos	1−3	Sinaloa
Guarch 26'	Report	Villegas 13'; García 45'; Arriola 53'

Estadio Tres de Marzo,
Zapopan, Jalisco
Attendance: 936
Referee: Diego Montaño Robles
January 21, 2014
18:00

Sinaloa	3−1	Estudiantes Tecos
García 30'; Arriola 41'; López 63'	Report	Cortés 63'

Estadio Banorte,
Culiacan, Sinaloa
Attendance: 2,423
Referee: Fernando Hernández

Sinaloa won the round 6−2 on aggregate

January 15, 2014
21:00

Guadalajara	1−1	U. de G.
Hernández 43' (pen.)	Report	Rodríguez 73'

Estadio Omnilife,
Zapopan, Jalisco
Attendance: 20,556
Referee: Miguel Ángel Ayala
January 21, 2014
21:00

U. de G.	0−1	Guadalajara
	Report	López 55'

Estadio Jalisco,
Guadalajara, Jalisco
Attendance: 23,915
Referee: Uriel Olvera Ríos

Guadalajara won the round 2−1 on aggregate

February 4, 2014
19:00

Guadalajara	1−2	Estudiantes Tecos
López 24'	Report	Campos 44', 77'

Estadio Omnilife,
Zapopan, Jalisco
Attendance: 3,674
Referee: Miguel Angel Flores
February 20, 2014
21:00

Estudiantes Tecos	1−1	Guadalajara
Rangel 19'	Report	Guzmán 12'

Estadio Tres de Marzo,
Zapopan, Jalisco
Attendance: 5,564
Referee: Arturo Cruz Hurtado

Estudiantes Tecos won the round 3−2 on aggregate

February 4, 2014
21:00

U. de G.	2−0	Sinaloa
J. Vázquez 14'; Rodríguez 61'	Report

Estadio Jalisco,
Guadalajara, Jalisco
Attendance: 1,299
Referee: Mario Alcántara
February 18, 2014
20:00

Sinaloa	1−0	U. de G.
Piceno 69'	Report

Estadio Banorte,
Culiacan, Sinaloa
Attendance: 3,324
Referee: Baruch Absalón

U. de G. won the round 2−1 on aggregate

February 26, 2014
19:00

Guadalajara	1−2	Sinaloa
Coronado 49' (pen.)	Report	Guido 16'; Cerda 83'

Estadio Omnilife,
Zapopan, Jalisco
Attendance: 4,201
Referee: Oscar Macías Romo
March 12, 2014
20:00

Sinaloa	0−1	Guadalajara
	Report	López 11'

Estadio Banorte,
Culiacan, Sinaloa
Attendance: 13,742
Referee: Uriel Olvera

Teams drew 2−2 on aggregate, Sinaloa won the round on away goals

February 26, 2014
21:00

U. de G.	0−3	Estudiantes Tecos
	Report	Ramírez 12'; Aguayo 61'; Medina 69'

Estadio Jalisco,
Guadalajara, Jalisco
Attendance: 3,377
Referee: Diego Montaño
March 11, 2014
19:00

Estudiantes Tecos	0−2	U. de G.
	Report	Rodríguez 1'; Cavallo 29'

Estadio Tres de Marzo,
Zapopan, Jalisco
Attendance: 1,935
Referee: Obed Gómez

Estudiantes Tecos won the round 3−2 on aggregate

=== Ranking of runners-up clubs ===
The best two runners-up advance to the Championship Stage. If two or more teams are equal on points on completion of the group matches, the following criteria are applied to determine the rankings:

1. superior goal difference;
2. higher number of goals scored;
3. higher number of goals scored away;
4. best position in the Relegation table;
5. fair play ranking;
6. drawing of lots.

Pos	Grp	Team	Pld	W	D	L	RW	GF	GA	GD	Pts	
1	3	Veracruz	6	3	2	1	2	9	2	+7	13	Best runners-up
2	1	Pachuca	6	3	2	1	2	10	6	+4	13	Best runners-up
3	5	Celaya	6	3	2	1	2	10	7	+3	13	
4	4	Mérida	6	3	0	3	1	7	7	0	10	
5	6	Guadalajara	6	2	2	2	1	6	6	0	9	
6	2	Puebla	6	2	2	2	1	7	12	−5	9	

Updated to match(es) played on unknown. Source:

== Championship Stage ==
The eight clubs that advance to this stage will be ranked and seeded 1 to 8. In case of ties, the same tiebreakers used to rank the runners-up will be used.

In this stage, all the rounds will be one-off game. If the game ends in a tie, there will proceed to penalty shootouts directly.

The venue will be determined as follows:

- The highest seeded club will host the match, regardless of the division the clubs are in.

=== Seeding ===
The qualified teams were seeded 1–8 in the championship stage according to their results in the group stage.

Seed	Team	Pld	W	D	L	RW	GF	GA	GD	Pts
1	UANL	6	4	2	0	3	20	2	+18	17
2	Oaxaca	6	4	1	1	3	10	3	+7	16
3	Monterrey	6	4	0	2	2	12	6	+6	14
4	Sinaloa	6	4	0	2	2	9	6	+3	14
5	Veracruz	6	3	2	1	2	9	2	+7	13
6	Pachuca	6	3	2	1	2	10	6	+4	13
7	Querétaro	6	3	1	2	3	10	7	+3	13
8	Atlante	6	2	3	1	2	8	6	+2	11

Updated to match(es) played on unknown. Source:

=== Bracket ===
The bracket of the championship stage was determined by the seeding as follows:

- Quarterfinals: Seed 1 vs. Seed 8 (QF1), Seed 2 vs. Seed 7 (QF2), Seed 3 vs. Seed 6 (QF3), Seed 4 vs. Seed 5 (QF4), with seeds 1–4 hosting the match
- Semifinals: Winner QF1 vs. Winner QF4 (SF1), Winner QF2 vs. Winner QF3 (SF2), with winners QF1 and QF2 hosting the match
- Finals: Winner SF1 vs. Winner SF2, with winner SF1 hosting the match

Quarterfinals
1	UANL	6
8	Atlante	0
4	Sinaloa	1 (3)
5	Veracruz	1 (5)
2	Oaxaca	2
7	Querétaro	1
3	Monterrey	1 (3)
6	Pachuca	1 (5)

Semifinals
1	UANL	3
5	Veracruz	0
2	Oaxaca	3
6	Pachuca	2

Final
1	UANL	3
2	Oaxaca	0

=== Quarterfinals ===
March 18, 2014
20:00

Monterrey	1−1	Pachuca
Cardozo 20'	Report	Lozano 75'
Penalties
Victor Ramos (penalty scored); Ramírez (penalty scored); Morelo (penalty missed); Juárez (penalty scored)	3−5	(penalty scored) Valencia; (penalty scored) Pajoy; (penalty scored) Ayoví; (penalty scored) Rodríguez; (penalty scored) M. Pérez

Estadio Tecnológico,
Monterrey, Nuevo Leon
Attendance: 10,360
Referee: Roberto Ríos Jácome

March 18, 2014
21:15

Sinaloa	1−1	Veracruz
Cerda 32'	Report	Borja 37'
Penalties
Piceno (penalty scored); Polo (penalty scored); Trujillo (penalty scored); Meza (penalty missed)	3−5	(penalty scored) Moreno; (penalty scored) Mañon; (penalty scored) Jiménez; (penalty scored) Cortés; (penalty scored) Borja

Estadio Banorte,
Culiacán, Sinaloa
Attendance: 6,125
Referee: Marco Antonio Ortiz Nava

March 19, 2014
19:00

Oaxaca	2−1	Querétaro
Torres 58'; Santoya 58'	Report	Ricardo Jesus 78'

Estadio Benito Juárez,
Oaxaca, Oaxaca
Attendance: 8,232
Referee: León Vicente Barajas

March 19, 2014
21:15

UANL	6−0	Atlante
Pulido 7', 16', 36'; Torres Mezzell 24'; Burbano 76'; Juninho 80'	Report

Estadio Universitario,
San Nicolás de los Garza, Nuevo León
Attendance: 40,265
Referee: Erick Yair Miranda

=== Semifinals ===
March 25, 2014
19:00

Oaxaca	3−2	Pachuca
Moreno 23'; Torres 34' (pen.); Santoya 89'	Report	Andrade 1', 4'

Estadio Benito Juárez,
Oaxaca, Oaxaca
Attendance: 8,592
Referee: Eduardo Galván

March 25, 2014
21:15

UANL	3−0	Veracruz
L. Martínez 3' (o.g.); Burbano 11'; Herrera 59'	Report

Estadio Universitario,
San Nicolás de los Garza, Nuevo León
Attendance: 40,552
Referee: Luis Enrique Santander

=== Final ===
April 9, 2014
21:00

UANL	3–0	Oaxaca
Juninho 36' (pen.); Pulido 66'; Lobos 82'	Report

Estadio Universitario,
San Nicolás de los Garza, Nuevo León
Attendance: 41,577
Referee: Jorge Isaac Rojas

== Top goalscorers ==
Rank	Player	Club	Goals
1	(Mexico) Alan Pulido	UANL	9
2	(Argentina) Emanuel Herrera	UANL	6
3	(Argentina) Eial Strahman	Mérida	5
4
4	(Mexico) Edgar Andrade	Pachuca	4
4	(Mexico) Ricardo Michel Vázquez	Delfines	4
6
6	(Colombia) Cristian Borja	Veracruz	3
6	(Colombia) Hernán Burbano	UANL	3
6	(Mexico) Jahir Barraza	Atlas	3
6	(Mexico) Jesús Isijara	Necaxa	3
6	(Mexico) Javier Eduardo López	Guadalajara	3
6	(Colombia) Wilson Morelo	Monterrey	3
6	(Argentina) Gabriel Rodríguez	U. de G.	3
6	(Mexico) Luis Eduardo Rodríguez	Atlante	3
6	(Colombia) Danny Santoya	Oaxaca	3

Source: LigaMX.net
