= Clausura 2014 Copa MX final =

- Event: Clausura 2014 Copa MX
UANL	Oaxaca
3	0
- Date: April 9, 2014
- Venue: Estadio Universitario, San Nicolás de los Garza, Nuevo León
- Referee: Jorge Isaac Rojas
- Attendance: 41,577

The Clausura 2014 Copa MX final was the final of the Clausura 2014 Copa MX the fourth edition of the Copa MX under its current format and 71st overall organized by the Mexican Football Federation, the governing body of association football in Mexico.

The final is contested in a single leg format between a Liga MX club, UANL and an Ascenso MX club, Oaxaca, which is the first time a Liga MX and Ascenso MX team met in the final. The leg was hosted by UANL at Estadio Universitario in San Nicolás de los Garza, Nuevo León on April 9, 2014. The winner earned a spot to face the winner of the Apertura 2013 edition, Monarcas Morelia, in a playoff to qualify as Mexico 3 to the 2015 Copa Libertadores.

== Venue ==
Due to the tournament's regulations the higher seed among both finalists during the group stage would host the final, thus Estadio Universitario hosted the final. The home venue of UANL since 1967, it has staged various Copa México and Liga MX finals, most recently the Apertura 2011 Liga MX final where UANL were victorious. Estadio Universitario has also hosted four matches of the 1986 FIFA World Cup, the stadium was the site where Mexico was eliminated in penalty kicks by West Germany. The stadium also staged eight matches of the 2011 FIFA U-17 World Cup, which included most of Group B matches and some knockout stage matches.

== Background ==
Tigres UANL, who is a two time winner last won the tournament in 1996 while Oaxaca has never won the tournament in their one year of existence. UANL last reached a final of any kind back in 2011 when they defeated Santos Laguna 4–1 on aggregate to win the Liga MX title. Oaxaca, who played their first season during the Apertura 2013 Ascenso MX season has previously never reached any type of final. Oaxaca reached the semifinals in the Apertura 2013 edition but were eliminated by Club Atlas in penalty kicks. This was the first final in the Copa MX era that a Liga MX and an Ascenso MX club faced in the final.

UANL won four and drew two group stage matches and scored 20 goals during group stage, as they were seeded second, they eliminated Atlante in the quarterfinals and Veracruz in the semifinals.

Oaxaca won four, drew one and lost one group stage matches, as they were seeded second they eliminated Querétaro in the quarterfinals and Pachuca in the semifinals, both teams are from Liga MX.

== Road to the finals ==
Note: In all results below, the score of the finalist is given first.

UANL		Round	Oaxaca	
Opponent	Result	Group stage	Opponent	Result
San Luis	1–0 (A)	Matchday 1	Chiapas	4–2 (A)
San Luis	6–1 (H)	Matchday 2	Chiapas	1–0 (H)
UAT	4–0 (H)	Matchday 3	Veracruz	0–0 (A)
UAT	1–1 (A)	Matchday 4	Veracruz	1–0 (H)
Puebla	8–0 (H)	Matchday 5	BUAP	0–1 (A)
Puebla	0–0 (A)	Matchday 6	BUAP	4–0 (H)
Group 2 winner: Pos / Team / Pld / Pts; 1 / UANL / 6 / 17; 2 / Puebla / 6 / 9; 3 / UAT / 6 / 6; 4 / San Luis / 6 / 6; Updated to match(es) played on unknown. Source:		Final standings	Group 3 winner: Pos / Team / Pld / Pts; 1 / Oaxaca / 6 / 16; 2 / Veracruz / 6 / 13; 3 / BUAP / 6 / 7; 4 / Chiapas / 6 / 4; Updated to match(es) played on unknown. Source:	
Opponent	Result	Knockout stage	Opponent	Result
Atlante	6–0 (H)	Quarterfinals	Querétaro	2–1 (H)
Veracruz	3–0 (H)	Semifinals	Pachuca	3–2 (H)

== Match ==
April 9, 2014
21:00

UANL	3–0	Oaxaca
Juninho 36' (pen.); Pulido 66'; Lobos 82'	Report

Estadio Universitario,
San Nicolás de los Garza, Nuevo León
Attendance: 41,577
Referee: Jorge Isaac Rojas

UANL	Oaxaca

GK	20	(Mexico) Sergio García
DF	3	(Brazil) Juninho (c)
DF	4	(Mexico) Hugo Ayala
DF	6	(Mexico) Jorge Torres Nilo
DF	29	(Mexico) Jesús Dueñas
MF	30	(Mexico) Carlos Salcido
MF	11	(Mexico) Damián Álvarez	(substituted off) 84'
MF	18	(United States) José Francisco Torres
MF	10	(Brazil) Danilinho	(substituted off) 87'
FW	17	(Mexico) Alan Pulido
FW	9	(Argentina) Emanuel Herrera	(substituted off) 56'
Substitutions:
GK	1	(Mexico) Enrique Palos
DF	2	(Mexico) Israel Jiménez
DF	14	(Mexico) Jorge Iván Estrada
DF	24	(Mexico) José Rivas
MF	16	(Mexico) Lucas Lobos	(substituted on) 56'
MF	22	(Mexico) Edgar Pacheco	(substituted on) 87'
MF	23	(Mexico) Édgar Lugo	(substituted on) 84'
Manager:
(Brazil) Ricardo Ferretti

GK	1	(Mexico) Sergio Arias
DF	5	(Mexico) Braulio Godínez (c)	(yellow card) 35'
DF	4	(Mexico) Arturo Ledesma
DF	28	(Mexico) Orlando Pineda
DF	15	(Mexico) Diego Martínez		(substituted off) 64'
MF	21	(Mexico) Martín Castillo	(yellow card) 47'
MF	6	(Mexico) Fernando Madrigal
MF	24	(Mexico) Mario Padilla
MF	7	(Mexico) Raymundo Torres		(substituted off) 78'
FW	10	(Colombia) Danny Santoya	(yellow card) 30'
FW	11	(Mexico) Jesús Moreno
Substitutions:
GK	34	(Mexico) Sergio Rodríguez
DF	25	(Mexico) Melchor Cerda
MF	14	(Colombia) Fabián Cuellar
MF	32	(Mexico) Eduardo Chávez
MF	33	(Mexico) Alonso Granados
MF	77	(Mexico) Santiago San Román		(substituted on) 78'
FW	14	(Colombia) Diego Calderón		(substituted on) 64'
Manager:
(Mexico) Ricardo Rayas

Assistant referees:
Carlos González Cervantes
Christian Kiabek Espinosa
Fourth official:
Roberto Ríos
