= 2013–14 Ascenso MX season =

Season of a Mexican football league

Ascenso MX
- Season: 2013–14
- Champions: Apertura: U. de G Clausura: Estudiantes Tecos
- Promoted: U. de G.
- Relegated: Zacatepec 1948 (stay in league after bought Cruz Azul Hidalgo)

The 2013–14 Ascenso MX season took place from 19 July 2013 to 12 April 2014 and was divided into two tournaments named Apertura 2013 and Clausura 2014. The Ascenso MX is the second-tier football league of Mexico.

== Changes from the previous season ==
- C.F. La Piedad were promoted to Liga MX. But rebranded Tiburones Rojos de Veracruz and Moved to Veracruz.
- Querétaro F.C. were relegated from Liga MX. But was able to purchase a Liga MX franchise and stay in 1st Division, Querétaro's Ascenso MX Team disappeared.
- Tiburones Rojos de Veracruz were rebranded Atlético San Luis and Moved to San Luis Potosí, San Luis Potosí.
- Irapuato FC was rebranded Zacatepec and moved to Zacatepec de Hidalgo, Morelos.
- Toros Neza was rebranded Delfines F.C. and moved to Ciudad del Carmen, Campeche.
- Tecamachalco was promoted from Segunda División de México rebranded Alebrijes de Oaxaca and moved to Oaxaca, Oaxaca.
- Club de Futbol Ballenas Galeana Morelos were promoted from Segunda División de México.
- Pumas Morelos were relegated to Segunda División de México, the team disappeared after the relegation.

== Stadia and locations ==
The following 15 clubs competed in the Liga de Ascenso during the 2013–2014 season:

Location of teams in the 2013–14 Ascenso MX

| Club | City | Stadium | Capacity |
|---|---|---|---|
| Altamira | Altamira | Estadio Altamira | 9,581 |
| Atlético San Luis | San Luis Potosí | Estadio Alfonso Lastras | 25,111 |
| Ballenas Galeana | Xochitepec | Estadio Mariano Matamoros | 16,000 |
| BUAP | Puebla | Estadio Olímpico de C.U. | 19,283 |
| Celaya | Celaya | Estadio Miguel Alemán | 23,182 |
| Cruz Azul Hidalgo | Ciudad Cooperativa Cruz Azul | Estadio 10 de Diciembre | 14,500 |
| Delfines | Ciudad del Carmen | Unidad Deportiva Campus II de la UAC | 8,985 |
| Estudiantes Tecos | Zapopan, Jalisco | Estadio Tres de Marzo | 18,779 |
| Mérida | Mérida | Estadio Carlos Iturralde | 15,087 |
| Necaxa | Aguascalientes | Estadio Victoria | 23,851 |
| Oaxaca | Oaxaca City | Estadio Benito Juárez | 10,250 |
| Sinaloa | Culiacán | Estadio Banorte | 17,898 |
| U. de G. | Guadalajara | Estadio Jalisco | 55,020 |
| UAT | Ciudad Victoria | Estadio Marte R. Gómez | 10,520 |
| Zacatepec | Cuernavaca | Estadio Centenario | 14,800 |

== Apertura 2013 ==
The 2013 Apertura was the first championship of the season. It began on 19 July 2013 and ended on 30 November 2013.

=== Standings ===
| Pos | Team | Pld | W | D | L | GF | GA | GD | Pts | Qualification |
|---|---|---|---|---|---|---|---|---|---|---|
| 1 | Oaxaca (Q) | 14 | 7 | 4 | 3 | 28 | 17 | +11 | 25 | Qualification for Liguilla semifinals |
| 2 | Necaxa (Q) | 14 | 7 | 4 | 3 | 21 | 15 | +6 | 25 | Qualification for Liguilla quarterfinals |
| 3 | Delfines F.C. (Q) | 14 | 7 | 3 | 4 | 24 | 12 | +12 | 24 | Qualification for Liguilla quarterfinals |
| 4 | Mérida FC (Q) | 14 | 6 | 5 | 3 | 22 | 13 | +9 | 23 | Qualification for Liguilla quarterfinals |
| 5 | UdeG (C, Q) | 14 | 7 | 2 | 5 | 19 | 21 | −2 | 23 | Qualification for Liguilla quarterfinals |
| 6 | UAT (Q) | 14 | 6 | 4 | 4 | 25 | 20 | +5 | 22 | Qualification for Liguilla quarterfinals |
| 7 | San Luis (Q) | 14 | 5 | 7 | 2 | 19 | 17 | +2 | 22 | Qualification for Liguilla quarterfinals |
| 8 | Dorados de Sinaloa | 14 | 3 | 9 | 2 | 15 | 11 | +4 | 18 | |
| 9 | Altamira | 14 | 5 | 3 | 6 | 26 | 26 | 0 | 18 | |
| 10 | Cruz Azul Hidalgo | 14 | 4 | 5 | 5 | 16 | 18 | −2 | 17 | |
| 11 | Lobos BUAP | 14 | 5 | 2 | 7 | 9 | 17 | −8 | 17 | |
| 12 | Estudiantes Tecos | 14 | 3 | 7 | 4 | 21 | 20 | +1 | 16 | |
| 13 | Celaya F.C. | 14 | 3 | 5 | 6 | 18 | 23 | −5 | 14 | |
| 14 | Ballenas Galeana | 14 | 3 | 4 | 7 | 14 | 28 | −14 | 13 | |
| 15 | Zacatepec 1948 | 14 | 1 | 2 | 11 | 9 | 28 | −19 | 5 | |

Updated to match(es) played on 4 December 2013. Source: .
Rules for classification: 1) points; 2) goal difference; 3) number of goals scored.
(C) Champions; (Q) Qualified for the phase indicated

=== Results ===
| Home \ Away | ALT | ATL | BGA | BUP | CEL | CRH | DEL | EST | MER | NEC | OAX | SIN | UDG | UAT | ZAC |
|---|---|---|---|---|---|---|---|---|---|---|---|---|---|---|---|
| Altamira | | | | 1–2 | 3–1 | | | 3–2 | | 1–3 | | 0–0 | 5–2 | 1–0 | |
| Atlético San Luis | 2–2 | | | | 1–1 | | | 2–1 | | | | 1–1 | 4–2 | 1–1 | 1–0 |
| Ballenas Galeana | 2–1 | 1–1 | | | | 0–1 | | | 0–4 | | | | 1–1 | 3–2 | 2–2 |
| BUAP | | 1–0 | 1–0 | | | 1–1 | 2–0 | | 0–2 | | 0–2 | | | | 1–0 |
| Celaya | | | 1–2 | 1–0 | | 2–2 | 1–1 | 0–0 | | 2–1 | 1–3 | | | | |
| Cruz Azul Hidalgo | 3–3 | 1–2 | | | | | | | 0–0 | | | 1–0 | 2–0 | 1–2 | 2–0 |
| Delfines | 1–0 | 3–0 | 3–1 | | | 3–0 | | | 0–1 | | | | 5–0 | | 2–0 |
| Estudiantes Tecos | | | 5–0 | 2–0 | | 1–1 | 1–4 | | 2–2 | 1–1 | 1–1 | | | | |
| Mérida | 3–1 | 1–2 | | | 3–0 | | | | | | | 1–1 | 0–2 | 2–2 | 2–0 |
| Necaxa | | 0–0 | 1–0 | 3–0 | | 2–0 | 3–0 | | 1–1 | | 2–0 | | | | |
| Oaxaca | 5–1 | 2–2 | 4–1 | | | 2–1 | 1–1 | | 2–0 | | | | | | 4–2 |
| Sinaloa | | | 1–1 | 2–0 | 2–2 | | 1–1 | 0–0 | | 3–0 | 1–1 | | | | |
| U. de G. | | | | 3–1 | 2–0 | | | 0–0 | | 4–0 | 1–0 | 2–1 | | 1–2 | |
| UAT | | | | 0–0 | 4–2 | | 1–0 | 3–4 | | 2–2 | 3–1 | 1–2 | | | |
| Zacatepec | 0–4 | | | | 1–4 | | | 3–1 | | 1–2 | | 0–0 | 0–1 | 0–2 | |

Updated to match(es) played on 10 November 2013. Source:
Legend: Blue = home team win; Yellow = draw; Red = away team win.

=== Liguilla (Playoffs) ===
The six best teams after first place played two games against each other on a home-and-away basis. The winner of each match up was determined by aggregate score. If the teams were tied, the Away goals rule applied.

The teams were seeded one to seven in quarterfinals, and were re-seeded one to four in semifinals, depending on their position in the general table. The higher seeded teams play on their home field during the second leg.

Quarterfinals
4 | Mérida FC | 0 | 2 | 2
5 | UdeG | 5 | 0 | 5
3 | Delfines F.C. | 1 | 3 | 4
6 | UAT | 1 | 1 | 2
2 | Necaxa | 2 | 2 | 4
7 | San Luis | 0 | 0 | 0

Semifinals
1 | Oaxaca | 0 | 2 | 2
5 | UdeG | 1 | 2 | 3
2 | Necaxa | 4 | 3 | 7
3 | Delfines F.C. | 0 | 0 | 0

Finals
2 | Necaxa | 0 | 1 | 1
5 | UdeG | 1 | 1 | 2

- If the two teams were tied after both legs, the away goals rule applied. If both teams were still tied, the higher seeded team advanced.
- Teams were re-seeded every round.
- The winner qualified to the playoff match vs the Clausura 2014 winner. However, if the winner had been the same in both tournaments, that team would have been the team promoted to the 2014–15 Mexican Primera División season without playing the Promotional Final

==== Quarterfinals ====
| Team 1 | Agg. | Team 2 | 1st leg | 2nd leg |
|---|---|---|---|---|
| Necaxa | 4–0 | San Luis | 2–0 | 2–0 |
| Delfines F.C. | 4–2 | UAT | 1–1 | 3–1 |
| Mérida FC | 2–5 | UdeG | 0–5 | 2–0 |

===== First leg =====
| 13 November 2013 | San Luis | 0–2 | Necaxa | San Luis Potosí |
| 17:00 | | Report | V. Lojero 61'; D. Cervantes 79' | Stadium: Estadio Alfonso Lastras; Attendance: 7,465; Referee: Fernando Hernández Gómez |

| 13 November 2013 | UAT | 1–1 | Delfines F.C. | Ciudad Victoria |
| 19:00 | P. Ibarra 16' | Report | J. Gómez 21' | Stadium: Estadio Marte R. Gómez; Attendance: 3,413; Referee: Eduardo Galván Basulto |

| 13 November 2013 | UdeG | 5–0 | Mérida FC | Guadalajara |
| 21:00 | J. Gutiérrez 14'; E. González 50'; C. Valdovinos 52'; D. Esqueda 64'; E. Mendoza 83' | Report | | Stadium: Estadio Jalisco; Attendance: 9,974; Referee: Quetzalli Alvarado Godínez |

===== Second leg =====
| 16 November 2013 | Mérida FC | 2–0 (2–5 agg.) | UdeG | Mérida |
| 16:00 | J. García 29'; H. Martín 80' | Report | | Stadium: Estadio Carlos Iturralde; Attendance: 3,179; Referee: León Vicente Barajas Anzures |

| 16 November 2013 | Delfines F.C. | 3–1 (4–2 agg.) | UAT | Ciudad del Carmen |
| 18:00 | R. Prieto 26', 70'; J. Ibarra 89' | Report | R. Nurse 45' | Stadium: Unidad Deportiva Campus II UNACAR; Attendance: 4,391; Referee: Ángel Monroy Bello |

| 16 November 2013 | Necaxa | 2-0 (4–0 agg.) | San Luis | Aguascalientes |
| 20:00 | V. Lojero 6', 49' | Report | | Stadium: Estadio Victoria; Attendance: 8,165; Referee: Obed Eliud Gómez Barreras |

==== Semifinals ====
| Team 1 | Agg. | Team 2 | 1st leg | 2nd leg |
|---|---|---|---|---|
| Necaxa | 7–0 | Delfines F.C. | 4–0 | 3–0 |
| Oaxaca | 2–3 | UdeG | 0–1 | 2–2 |

===== First leg =====
| 20 November 2013 | UdeG | 1–0 | Oaxaca | Guadalajara |
| 18:30 | R. Follé 24' | Report | | Stadium: Estadio Jalisco; Attendance: 14,363; Referee: Quetzalli Alvarado Godínez |

| 20 November 2013 | Delfines F.C. | 0–4 | Necaxa | Ciudad del Carmen |
| 20:30 | | Report | V. Lojero 4', 45'; J. Goncalves 14'; J. Isijara 85' | Stadium: Unidad Deportiva Campus II UNACAR; Attendance: 8,125; Referee: León Vicente Barajas Anzures |

===== Second leg =====
| 23 November 2013 | Oaxaca | 2–2 (2–3 agg.) | UdeG | Oaxaca |
| 17:00 | G. Ramírez 26'; J. Moreno 45' | Report | J. Gutiérrez 73'; D. Esqueda 79' | Stadium: Estadio Benito Juárez; Attendance: 7,252; Referee: Eduargo Galván Basulto |

| 23 November 2013 | Necaxa | 3–0 (7–0 agg.) | Delfines F.C. | Aguascalientes |
| 20:00 | S. Guadarrama 55'; J. Goncalves 70'; C. Hurtado 83' | Report | | Stadium: Estadio Victoria; Attendance: 10,746; Referee: Ángel Monroy Bello |

==== Final ====
| Team 1 | Agg. | Team 2 | 1st leg | 2nd leg |
|---|---|---|---|---|
| Necaxa | 1–2 | UdeG | 0–1 | 1–1 |

===== First leg =====
| 27 November 2013 | UdeG | 1–0 | Necaxa | Guadalajara |
| 20:00 | J. Gutiérrez 55' | Report | | Stadium: Estadio Jalisco; Attendance: 52,230; Referee: Quetzalli Alvarado Godínez |

===== Second leg =====
| 30 November 2013 | Necaxa | 1–1 (1–2 agg.) | UdeG | Aguascalientes |
| 20:00 | J. Goncalves 86' | Report | J. Gutiérrez 56' | Stadium: Estadio Victoria; Attendance: 22,104; Referee: Eduardo Galván Basurto |

Apertura 2013 winner:

1st title

== Clausura 2014 ==
=== Standings ===
| Pos | Team | Pld | W | D | L | GF | GA | GD | Pts | Qualification |
|---|---|---|---|---|---|---|---|---|---|---|
| 1 | UAT (Q) | 14 | 8 | 5 | 1 | 22 | 13 | +9 | 29 | Qualification for Liguilla semifinals |
| 2 | Estudiantes Tecos (C, Q) | 14 | 7 | 3 | 4 | 23 | 15 | +8 | 24 | Qualification for Liguilla quarterfinals |
| 3 | Necaxa (Q) | 14 | 6 | 4 | 4 | 19 | 15 | +4 | 22 | Qualification for Liguilla quarterfinals |
| 4 | U. de G. (P, Q) | 14 | 6 | 4 | 4 | 17 | 13 | +4 | 22 | Qualification for Liguilla quarterfinals |
| 5 | Oaxaca (Q) | 14 | 5 | 6 | 3 | 22 | 19 | +3 | 21 | Qualification for Liguilla quarterfinals |
| 6 | Delfines (Q) | 14 | 4 | 8 | 2 | 20 | 17 | +3 | 20 | Qualification for Liguilla quarterfinals |
| 7 | Dorados de Sinaloa (Q) | 14 | 6 | 1 | 7 | 19 | 17 | +2 | 19 | Qualification for Liguilla quarterfinals |
| 8 | Lobos BUAP | 14 | 5 | 4 | 5 | 17 | 19 | −2 | 19 | |
| 9 | Mérida FC | 14 | 4 | 6 | 4 | 21 | 21 | 0 | 18 | |
| 10 | Cruz Azul Hidalgo | 14 | 5 | 3 | 6 | 17 | 17 | 0 | 18 | |
| 11 | Zacatepec 1948 | 14 | 5 | 1 | 8 | 17 | 26 | −9 | 16 | |
| 12 | San Luis | 14 | 4 | 3 | 7 | 18 | 22 | −4 | 15 | |
| 13 | Ballenas Galeana | 14 | 3 | 6 | 5 | 17 | 22 | −5 | 15 | |
| 14 | Celaya F.C. | 14 | 4 | 2 | 8 | 12 | 18 | −6 | 14 | |
| 15 | Altamira | 14 | 2 | 6 | 6 | 11 | 18 | −7 | 12 | |

(C) Champions; (P) Promoted; (Q) Qualified for the phase indicated

=== Results ===
| Home \ Away | ALT | ATL | BGA | BUP | CEL | CRH | DEL | EST | MER | NEC | OAX | SIN | UDG | UAT | ZAC |
|---|---|---|---|---|---|---|---|---|---|---|---|---|---|---|---|
| Altamira | | 1–1 | 2–2 | | | 2–2 | 0–0 | | 0–0 | | 0–0 | | | | 4–0 |
| Atlético San Luis | | | 3–1 | 1–2 | | 1–0 | 2–2 | | 2–3 | 2–0 | 1–2 | | | | |
| Ballenas Galeana | | | | 1–1 | 1–0 | | 1–2 | 1–3 | | 0–0 | 1–1 | 2–1 | | | |
| BUAP | 2–1 | | | | 1–1 | | | 2–1 | | 1–2 | | 0–1 | 2–1 | 0–1 | |
| Celaya | 0–1 | 2–1 | | | | | | | 1–2 | | | 0–1 | 1–1 | 2–1 | 0–2 |
| Cruz Azul Hidalgo | | | 3–1 | 3–1 | 1–0 | | 0–0 | 2–1 | | 1–2 | 2–0 | | | | |
| Delfines | | | | 2–0 | 2–3 | | | 1–1 | | 0–0 | 2–2 | 2–1 | | 1–1 | |
| Estudiantes Tecos | 1–0 | 0–1 | | | 2–0 | | | | | | | 2–0 | 0–0 | 1–2 | 3–1 |
| Mérida | | | 2–2 | 1–1 | | 3–1 | 2–2 | 1–1 | | 2–1 | 3–3 | | | | |
| Necaxa | 4–0 | | | | 1–0 | | | 3–4 | | | | 3–2 | 0–0 | 1–1 | 2–1 |
| Oaxaca | | | | 2–2 | 1–2 | | | 1–3 | | 1–0 | | 1–0 | 3–0 | 2–2 | |
| Sinaloa | 2–0 | 3–1 | | | | 1–1 | | | 1–0 | | | | 4–1 | 1–2 | 1–2 |
| U. de G. | 2–0 | 2–0 | 1–1 | | | 2–0 | 3–1 | | 1–0 | | | | | | 3–0 |
| UAT | 2–0 | 1–1 | 2–0 | | | 2–1 | | | 3–2 | | | | 1–0 | | 1–1 |
| Zacatepec | | 3–1 | 1–3 | 1–2 | | 1–0 | 1–3 | | 2–0 | | 1–3 | | | | |

Updated to match(es) played on 12 April 2014. Source:
Legend: Blue = home team win; Yellow = draw; Red = away team win.

=== Liguilla (Playoffs) ===
The six best teams after the first place played two games against each other on a home-and-away basis. The winner was determined by aggregate score. If the teams were tied, the Away goals rule applied.

The teams were seeded one to seven in quarterfinals, and were re-seeded one to four in semifinals, depending on their position in the general table. The higher seeded teams played on their home field during the second leg.

Quarterfinals
4 | UdeG | 1 | 1 | 2
5 | Oaxaca | 3 | 0 | 3
3 | Necaxa | 2 | 4 | 6
6 | Delfines | 2 | 1 | 3
2 | Estudiantes Tecos | 1 | 1 | 2
7 | Dorados | 1 | 1 | 2

Semifinals
1 | UAT | 0 | 2 | 2
5 | Oaxaca | 2 | 0 | 2
2 | Estudiantes Tecos | 0 | 0 | 0
3 | Necaxa | 0 | 0 | 0

Finals
1 | UAT | 0 | 1(3) | 1(3)
2 | Estudiantes Tecos | 0 | 1(4) | 1(4)

- If the two teams were tied after both legs, the away goals rule applied. If both teams were still tied, higher seeded team advanced.
- Teams were re-seeded every round.
- The winner qualified to the playoff match vs UdeG (Apertura 2013 Champions). The winner was promoted to the 2014–15 Mexican Primera División season.

==== Quarterfinals ====
| Team 1 | Agg. | Team 2 | 1st leg | 2nd leg |
|---|---|---|---|---|
| Estudiantes Tecos | 2–2 | Dorados | 1–1 | 1–1 |
| Necaxa | 6–3 | Delfines | 2–2 | 4–1 |
| UdeG | 2–3 | Oaxaca | 1–3 | 1–0 |

===== First leg =====
| 16 April 2014 | Oaxaca | 3–1 | UdeG | Oaxaca |
| 18:00 | D. Calderón 52'; D. Santoya 55'; J. Moreno 60' | Report | E. González 20' | Stadium: Estadio Baenito Juárez; Attendance: 7,461; Referee: Diego Montaño Robles |

| 16 April 2014 | Delfines | 2–2 | Necaxa | Ciudad del Carmen |
| 20:00 | D. Valdéz 36'; C. Pinto 67' | Report | V. Alvarado 31'; J. Isijara 77' | Stadium: Unidad Deportiva Campus II UNACAR; Attendance: 2,235; Referee: Quetzalli Alvarado Godínez |

| 16 April 2014 | Dorados | 1–1 | Estudiantes Tecos | Culiacán |
| 21:00 | R. Enríquez 3' | Report | J. Cuevas 19' | Stadium: Estadio Banorte; Attendance: 8,919; Referee: Baruch Absalón Castellanos |

===== Second leg =====
| 19 April 2014 | UdeG | 1–0 (2–3 agg.) | Oaxaca | Guadalajara |
| 12:00 | E. González 11' | Report | | Stadium: Estadio Jalisco; Attendance: 15,964; Referee: León Vicente Barajas Anzures |

| 19 April 2014 | Estudiantes Tecos | 1–1 (2–2 agg.) | Dorados | Zapopan |
| 18:00 | H. Aguayo 59' | Report | D. Olsina 32' | Stadium: Estadio Tres de Marzo; Attendance: 4,536; Referee: Ángel Monroy Bello |

| 19 April 2014 | Necaxa | 4–1 (6–3 agg.) | Delfines | Aguascalientes |
| 20:00 | E. Lillingston 69'; S. Guadarrama 73'; V. Lojero 90'; J. Goncalves 90+3' | Report | R. Vázquez 50' | Stadium: Estadio Victoria; Attendance: 8,833; Referee: Marco Antonio Ortíz Nava |

==== Semifinals ====
| Team 1 | Agg. | Team 2 | 1st leg | 2nd leg |
|---|---|---|---|---|
| UAT | 2–2 | Oaxaca | 0–2 | 2–0 |
| Estudiantes Tecos | 0–0 | Necaxa | 0–0 | 0–0 |

===== First leg =====
| 23 April 2014 | Oaxaca | 2–0 | UAT | Oaxaca |
| 19:00 | D. Santoya 59', 65' | Report | | Stadium: Estadio Benito Juárez; Attendance: 8,412; Referee: Diego Montaño Robles |

| 23 April 2014 | Necaxa | 0–0 | Estudiantes Tecos | Aguascalientes |
| 21:00 | | Report | | Stadium: Estadio Victoria; Attendance: 12,187; Referee: Fernando Hernández Gómez |

===== Second leg =====
| 26 April 2014 | Estudiantes Tecos | 0–0 (0–0 agg.) | Necaxa | Zapopan |
| 19:00 | | Report | | Stadium: Estadio Tres de Marzo; Attendance: 5,909; Referee: León Vicente Barajas Anzures |

| 26 April 2014 | UAT | 2–0 (2–2 agg.) | Oaxaca | Ciudad Victoria |
| 21:00 | R. Nurse 22'; R. Saucedo 39' | Report | | Stadium: Estadio Marte R. Gómez; Attendance: 16,982; Referee: Marco Antonio Ortíz Nava |

==== Final ====
| Team 1 | Agg. | Team 2 | 1st leg | 2nd leg |
|---|---|---|---|---|
| UAT | 1–1 | Estudiantes Tecos | 0–0 | 1–1 |

===== First leg =====
| 30 April 2014 | Estudiantes Tecos | 0–0 | UAT | Zapopan |
| 21:00 | | Report | | Stadium: Estadio Marte R. Gómez; Attendance: 8,409; Referee: Marco Antonio Ortíz Nava |

===== Second leg =====
| 3 May 2014 | UAT | 1–1 (1–1 agg.) (3–4 p) | Estudiantes Tecos | Ciudad Victoria |
| 21:00 | S. Rosas 39' | Report | E. Rangel 63' | Stadium: Estadio Marte R. Gómez; Attendance: 18,000; Referee: León Vicente Barajas Anzures |

Clausura 2014 winners:

1st title

== Campeón de Ascenso 2014 ==
=== First leg ===
7 May 2014
21:00

| Estudiantes Tecos | 0–0 | UdeG |
|---|---|---|
| | Report |

Estadio Tres de Marzo, Zapopan
Attendance: 15,978
Referee: Marco Antonio Ortíz Nava

=== Second leg ===
10 May 2014
20:00

| UdeG | 1–1 | Estudiantes Tecos |
|---|---|---|
| Alatorre 83' | Report | Bueno 57' |
Penalties
| Follé (penalty scored); González (penalty scored); Palacios (penalty scored); Cruz (penalty missed); Hernández (penalty scored) | 4–3 | (penalty scored) Campos; (penalty scored) Maya; (penalty scored) Argüelles; (penalty missed) Rangel; (penalty missed) Acosta |

Estadio Jalisco, Guadalajara
Attendance: 54,445
Referee: León Vicente Barajas

Champions

1st title

== Relegation table ==
The relegated team will be the team with the lowest ratio by summing the points scored in the following tournaments: Apertura 2011, Clausura 2012, Apertura 2012, Clausura 2013, Apertura 2013 and Clausura 2014.

| Rank | Team | Points | Games | Ave. |
|---|---|---|---|---|
| 10 | Dorados de Sinaloa | 106 | 84 | 1.2619 |
| 11 | Celaya F.C. | 98 | 84 | 1.1667 |
| 12 | Altamira | 94 | 84 | 1.1190 |
| 13 | Cruz Azul Hidalgo | 86 | 84 | 1.0238 |
| 14 | Ballenas Galeana | 28 | 28 | 1.0000 |
| 15 | Zacatepec 1948 | 80 | 84 | 0.9524 |
