= David Ayala =

David Ayala may refer to:

- David Ayala (footballer, born 2000), Mexican football midfielder for Tigres UANL
- David Ayala (footballer, born 2002), Argentine football midfielder for Portland Timbers
