= Emanuel Herrera =

Argentine footballer

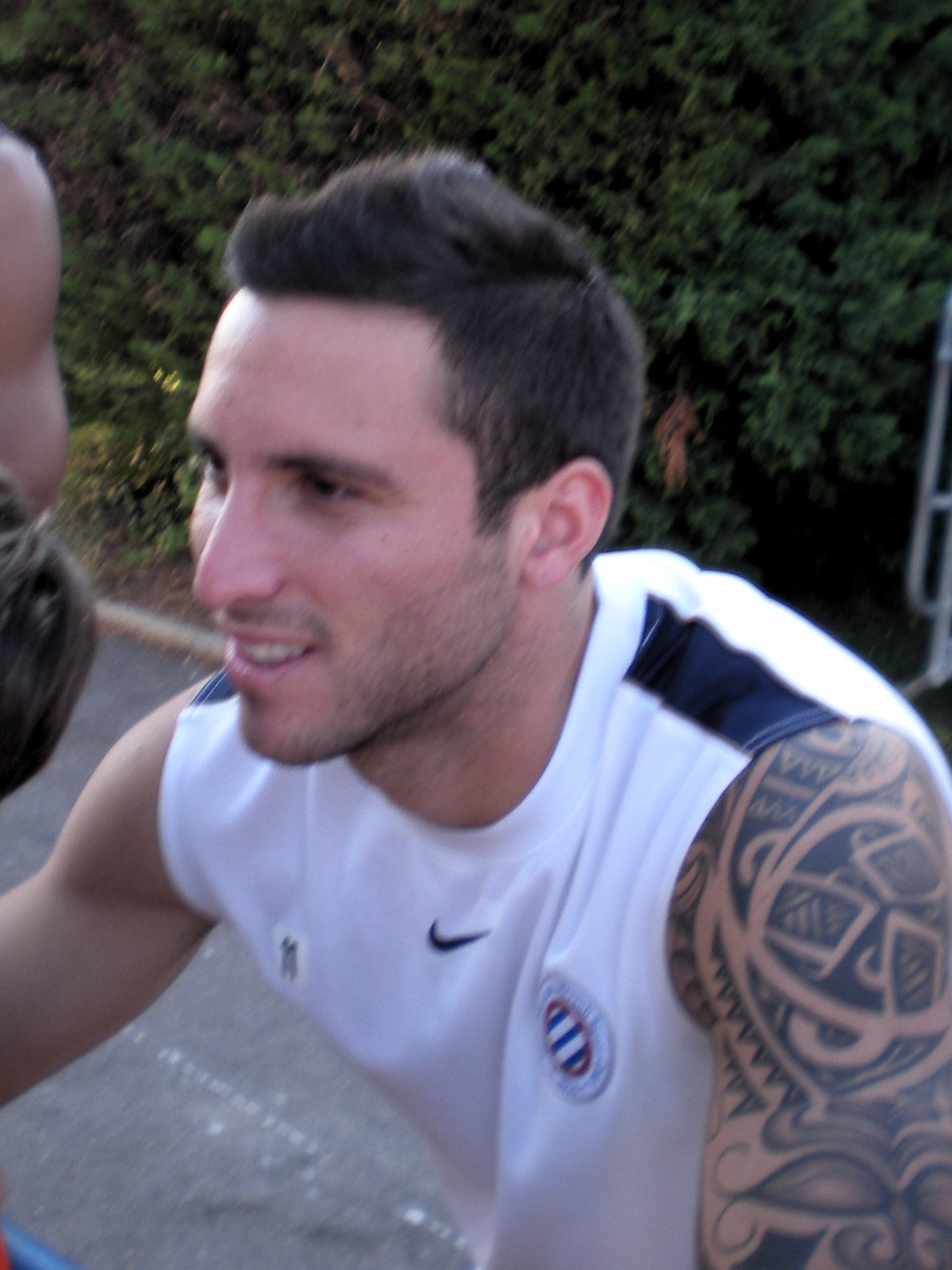
- Herrera in 2012

Personal information
- Full name: Emanuel Herrera
- Date of birth: 13 April 1987 (age 39)
- Place of birth: Rosario, Argentina
- Height: 1.86 m (6 ft 1 in)
- Position: Striker

Youth career
- 2001–2007: Rosario Central

Senior career*
Years	Team	Apps	(Gls)
2008–2010	Rosario Central	0	(0)
2008–2009	→ Chacarita Juniors (loan)	2	(0)
2010	→ Sportivo Italiano (loan)	4	(0)
2010	→ Patronato (loan)	10	(0)
2011	Deportes Concepción	35	(27)
2012	Unión Española	21	(11)
2012–2014	Montpellier	41	(6)
2013	Montpellier B	1	(2)
2014	→ Tigres UANL (loan)	10	(0)
2014–2017	Emelec	58	(16)
2017	→ Melgar (loan)	21	(13)
2017	→ Lobos BUAP (loan)	6	(0)
2018–2020	Sporting Cristal	84	(65)
2021	Argentinos Juniors	14	(1)
2022	Celaya	21	(4)
2023	Universitario de Deportes	27	(6)
2024	Ñublense	8	(0)
2024–2025	Quilmes	28	(8)
2025	Deportes La Serena	8	(0)
- * Club domestic league appearances and goals as of 23 January 2026

Emanuel Herrera (Spanish pronunciation: [emaˈnwel eˈreɾa], born 13 April 1987) is an Argentine footballer who plays as a striker.

He played in the youth ranks of Rosario Central for six years, but never debuted with the first team. He was then loaned to Chacarita Juniors, Sportivo Italiano and Patronato in the Argentine second division. A lack of options in his country led him to look for opportunities in Chile, where he accepted the offer of Deportes Concepción. In the Chilean team, he consolidated himself as a starter and, after a great 2011 season where he scored 29 goals in 39 matches, he was signed by Unión Española. Despite being there for only half a season, he managed to be the 2012 Torneo Apertura top scorer and to score five times in the 2012 Copa Libertadores. This caught the interest of Montpellier, which paid $3.5 million for him. He stayed in the French team for two seasons, but after an irregular start to the 2013–14 campaign he was loaned to Tigres, where he played for a semester and won the Copa MX. Following this, Herrera was signed by Emelec, where he stayed for three seasons and scored 21 goals in 78 matches, winning the 2014 and 2015 Campeonato Ecuatoriano. In 2017, he was loaned first to Peruvian club FBC Melgar and then to Mexican club Lobos BUAP.

== Club career ==
=== Career in Argentina ===
Herrera was born in Rosario. Herrera began his football career at Chacarita Juniors. At 21, and without being able to impose in the first team, he left his first club Chacarita Juniors and was transferred to Sportivo Italiano in Buenos Aires but his stay in Buenos Aires where move to Patronato. His three seasons in Argentina are a failure with only 16 games in total without a goal.

=== Deportes Concepción ===
Herrera move to Chile by joining Concepción with the help of his agent. On 26 February 2011, Herrera made his debut for the club in a 2–0 win over Deportes Puerto Montt on the opening game of the season. On 5 March 2011, Herrera scored his first goal for the club against Lota Schwager. After 9 games without scoring, Herrera scored twice in a 4–1 win over Everton de Viña del Mar on 8 May 2011. 29 May 2011, Herrera scored twice in a 2–2 draw against C.S.D. Rangers. Herrera began scoring for the three weeks with a double against Club de Deportes Copiapó, Deportes Naval and San Marcos de Arica. After scoring 11 goals in the first half of the season, Herrera was able to be joint-top scorer along with Claudio Latorre, Ariel Roberto Pereyra and Cristian Milla.

Following the club lost in the final last year to Deportes Iquique, the club faced Club Universidad de Chile whether to take the third spot for the Copa Sudamericana. In the first leg in the playoffs for the third spot for the Copa Sudamericana in Club Deportes Concepció stadium, Herrera scored a brace in a 2–2 draw against Club Universidad de Chile on 27 July 2011. In the second leg in the playoffs for the third spot for the Copa Sudamericana Club Universidad de Chile (host) won 2–0, eliminating Club Deportes Concepción out of the Copa Sudamericana.

Despite the club lose the spot in the Copa Sudamericana, Herrera played strong in the league scoring 11 goal, being the scorer of the tournament. Towards the end of the season, Herrera scored 16 goals, tallying up in total of 27. But the team failed to qualified for the playoffs for promotion and placed third in the league, just two points behind Deportes Naval.

=== Unión Española ===
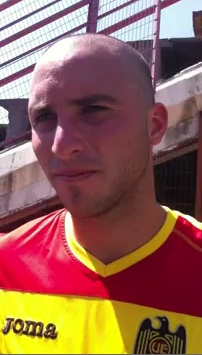
Emanuel Herrera at the Estadio Santa Laura.

After the team failed to qualified for the playoffs for promotion, it confirmed the transfer on 13 December 2011 that Herrera will join Chilean Primera División side Unión Española, signing a five-year deal. On 25 January 2012, Herrera officially made his debut for the club in the Copa Libertadores First Stage of the first leg against Tigres and on 2 February 2012, he scored the first goal for the club in the match in the second leg which was 2–2, going through to the group stage. In the Copa Libertadores, Herrera would score 4 more against Junior de Barranquilla, Club Bolívar (scored again) and Club Deportivo Universidad Católica (all four goals come in the group stage). Herrera then provided assists in the Copa Libertadores in both leg against Boca Juniors which in both games lost. In the Copa Libertadores, Herrera entered in the competition scoring 5 goals in 10 games.

In the opening season of Chilean Primera División, Herrera scored on his debut in a 2–0 win over Audax Italiano on 29 January 2012. After 3 games without scoring, Herrera scored a brace in a 2–2 draw against Club Deportivo Universidad Católica on 26 February 2012 and scored in the next game on 3 March 2012 in a 3–1 win over C.D. Palestino which followed by the next game on 10 March 2012 in a 3–1 loss against CD Huachipato. On 24 March 2012, Herrera scored twice and setting up a goal for Fernando Cordero in a 5–2 win over Deportes La Serena. On 7 April 2012, Herrera scored and setting up a goal for Mauro Díaz in a 4–2 win over Colo-Colo. On 21 April 2012, Herrera scored in a 2–2 draw against Santiago Wanderers. On 28 April 2012, Herrera scored and setting up a goal for Braulio Leal in a 4–1 win over C.D. Universidad de Concepción. After scoring 10 goals in the regular season, Unión Española won the qualification for the final round to be in fifth place.

In the Play-Offs Primera División Apertura Quarter Final first leg against Club Deportivo Universidad Católica, Herrera scored and setting up a goal for Cordero in a 3–1 win which the second leg was 1–1 draw. At the end of Campeonato Apertura, Herrera was a joint-top scorer Sebastián Ubilla. During his time at Unión Española, Herrera earned the nickname 'El Tanque' due to his physical, dribbler and rather fast, it has the characteristic mark of the essential goals of the right foot. His first season at Unión Española led interests from French Champions Montpellier.

=== Montpellier ===
On 6 July 2012, Herrera officially signed for Montpellier for worth 3.5 million on a three-year deal. Herrera was presented in Montpellier's shirt and given number 11 shirt. His move was a replacement for Olivier Giroud who left for Arsenal in the summer. On his move, manager René Girard says Herrera drew comparison to Real Madrid and Argentinian striker Gonzalo Higuaín.

"I know he will be reminded of Giroud’s milestone being his replacement. We’ll have to move on quickly and erase it. He reminds me of Higuain in the game, the morphology is the same. While his game is different from that of Olivier, I have chosen him because he can adapt to our group. He is a good football player and a good goalscorer. He can blend into our game without completely changing what we’ve done so far."

— Manager René Girard on Herrera.

Herrera scored 4 goals for the last 5 games in the friendly matches. Herrera made his debut for the club in a competitive match at Trophée des Champions against Lyon on 28 July 2012 where he converted a penalty, scoring his first goal to make it 2–1. But Lyon managed to pull one back and the game played through until the penalty shootout and Montpellier lost 4–2. On 10 August 2012 in the opening game of Ligue 1 season, Herrera made his debut for the club in a 1–1 tie against Toulouse and he was replaced by John Utaka early in the second half He scored the following week against FC Lorient but Montpellier could not manage to get their first win of the season as the opposition scored two very late goals. He recently scored in a 3–2 away defeat to Marseille.

=== Tigres UANL ===
On 10 January 2014, Herrera arrived to Monterrey to sign a loan with Mexican outfit Tigres UANL. On 1 February 2014, Herrera made his official debut with Tigres playing the second half of the local derby against CF Monterrey in a game that finished in a 0–0 draw. On 4 February 2014, Herrera scored two goals in the Copa MX against Correcaminos UAT, at the Estadio Universitario. On 27 February 2014, Herrera scored a hat-trick against CF Puebla for a Copa MX game. On 25 March 2014, he scored a goal against Tiburones Rojos de Veracruz in the Copa MX semifinals. On 9 April 2014, Herrera played the finals of the 2014 Copa MX where Tigres beat Alebrijes de Oaxaca by 3–0 at the Estadio Universitario. In May 2014 his loan to Tigres UANL was finished.

=== Emelec ===
Coach Gustavo Quinteros brought the player in as a replacement for Denis Stracqualursi after his sale to Baniyas of the United Arab Emirates. He made his debut on July 19, 2014, on round 20 of the first stage of the 2014 Ecuadorian championship, in the 1–0 defeat against Deportivo Cuenca. Still looking for a starting position, his first two goals were scored on the fourth date of the second round, in a 5–0 win over El Nacional. He continued alternating between substitution and ownership and between August and December he did not score goals in the Ecuadorian Serie A. The only parenthesis to this was the score in the first leg of the round of 16 of the Copa Sudamericana against Goias. In the final stretch of the tournament the situation improved for Herrera, since he scored continuously: first two goals in a duel against LDU Loja, another one in the 2–1 victory against Manta and the discount in the 1–2 defeat against Deportivo Cuenca.

=== Ñublense ===
In 2024, Herrera back to Chile and signed with Ñublense in the top division.

=== Deportes La Serena ===
Back to Chile again, Herrera signed with Deportes La Serena on 13 July 2025.

== Honours ==
=== Club ===
Tigres UANL

- Copa MX (1): Clausura 2014

C.S. Emelec

- Ecuadorian Serie A (2): 2014, 2015

Sporting Cristal

- Primera División (2): 2018, 2020

Universitario de Deportes

- Peruvian Primera División: 2023
