= Cercado =

Cercado may refer to:

== Places ==
- Cercado Province (Beni), a province of the Beni department in Bolivia
- Cercado Province (Cochabamba), a province of the Cochabamba department in Bolivia
- Cercado Province (Oruro), a province of the Oruro department in Bolivia
- Cercado Province (Tarija), a province of the Tarija department in Bolivia
- Cercado de Lima, the proper name of the Lima District in Peru
- El Cercado, a town in San Juan Province, Dominican Republic

== People ==
- César Cercado (born 1989), Mexican footballer
