= Israel García =

Israel García may refer to:

- Israel García (footballer, born 1999), Mexican footballer
- Israel García (footballer, born 2004), Spanish footballer
- Israel Garcia (boxer) (born 1970), Puerto Rican boxer
