= Alejandro Durán (disambiguation) =

Alejandro Durán is a Mexican actor.

Alejandro Durán may also refer to:

- Alejandro Durán (footballer)
- Alejandro Durán (cyclist)
- Alejo Durán
