= Marco Antonio Trejo =

Mexican footballer and manager (born 1958)

Personal information
- Full name: Marco Antonio Trejo León
- Date of birth: 8 December 1958 (age 67)
- Place of birth: Mexico City, Mexico
- Height: 1.75 m (5 ft 9 in)
- Position: Defender

Senior career*
Years	Team	Apps	(Gls)
1979–1985	Cruz Azul		
1986–1992	Atlas		

Managerial career
- 1996: Toluca
- Atlético Mexiquense
- 2003–2004: Cruz Azul Oaxaca
- 2005: Colima
- 2005–2006: Querétaro
- 2007–2008: Atlético Mexiquense
- 2008–2010: Durango
- 2011: La Piedad
- 2012: Cruz Azul Hidalgo
- 2014: Tampico Madero
- 2015: Teca UTN
- 2015: Oaxaca
- 2015–2016: Malinalco
- 2017–2019: Puebla (assistant)
- 2019: Veracruz U–20
- 2019: Veracruz (assistant)
- 2021: Irapuato
- * Club domestic league appearances and goals

Marco Antonio Trejo León (born 8 December 1958) is a Mexican football manager and former player.
