= Efrén Hernández =

Mexican football manager (born 1977)

Personal information
- Full name: Efrén Hernández Mondragón
- Date of birth: 4 August 1977 (age 49)
- Place of birth: Mexico City, Mexico
- Height: 1.70 m (5 ft 7 in)
- Position: Midfielder

Team information
- Current team: Oaxaca (Assistant)

Senior career*
Years	Team	Apps	(Gls)
1999–2000	Puebla		
2000	América		
2000–2001	León		
2002–2003	América		
2003–2004	Tigrillos Coapa		
2005–2007	Tampico Madero		
2009	UAG		
2009–2010	Veracruz		
2011	La Piedad		
2011–2012	Irapuato		
2013	Celaya		
2013	Zacatepec		
2014	Celaya		

Managerial career
- 2025: Zacatepec (Assistant)
- 2025: Cañoneros
- 2026: Oaxaca
- 2026–: Oaxaca (Assistant)
- * Club domestic league appearances and goals

Efrén Hernández Mondragón (born 4 August 1977) is a Mexican former professional footballer who played as a midfielder.

== Playing career ==
He began his career in Puebla. In 2000, he joined América.

== Managerial career ==
In 2026, he signed as coach of Oaxaca.
