= Rodrigo Follé =

Brazilian footballer

Personal information
- Full name: Rodrigo Follé Ferrazzo
- Date of birth: February 24, 1984 (age 42)
- Place of birth: Veranópolis, Brazil

Senior career*
| Years | Team | Apps | (Gls) |
- Leones Negros UdeG
- Lobos BUAP
- Leones Negros
- * Club domestic league appearances and goals

Rodrigo Follé Ferrazzo (born February 24, 1984), commonly known as Follé, is a Brazilian former professional footballer who played as a defender.

Follé became a naturalized Mexican citizen before re-joining Leones Negros for the 2014-15 Liga MX.
