= David Ayala (footballer, born 2000) =

Mexican footballer (born 2000)

Personal information
- Full name: David René Ayala Hernández
- Date of birth: 6 April 2000 (age 26)
- Place of birth: Naucalpan, Mexico
- Height: 1.83 m (6 ft 0 in)
- Position: Midfielder

Team information
- Current team: Oaxaca
- Number: 20

Youth career
- 2018–2022: UANL

Senior career*
Years	Team	Apps	(Gls)
2021–2025	UANL	14	(0)
2026–	Oaxaca	12	(0)
- * Club domestic league appearances and goals as of 22 September 2026

David René Ayala Hernández (born 6 April 2000) is a Mexican professional footballer who plays as a midfielder for Liga de Expansión MX club Oaxaca.

== Career statistics ==
=== Club ===
As of 22 September 2026

Club	Season	League			Cup		Continental		Other		Total	
Club	Season	Division	Apps	Goals	Apps	Goals	Apps	Goals	Apps	Goals	Apps	Goals
UANL	2021–22	Liga MX	11	0	—		—		1 (Note: Appearances in Leagues Cup)	0	12	0
UANL	2022–23	Liga MX	3	0	1 (Note: Appearances in Copa Sky por México)	0	—		—		4	0
UANL	Total		14	0	1	0	—		1	0	16	0
Oaxaca	2025–26	Liga de Expansión MX	10	0	—		—		—		10	0
Oaxaca	2026–27	Liga de Expansión MX	2	0	—		—		—		2	0
Oaxaca	Total		12	0	—		—		—		12	0
Career total			26	0	1	0	0	0	1	0	28	0

== Honours ==
Tigres UANL

- Liga MX: Clausura 2023
