= Eial Strahman =

Argentine footballer

Personal information
- Full name: Eial Strahman
- Date of birth: 21 June 1989 (age 37)
- Place of birth: Córdoba, Argentina
- Height: 1.86 m (6 ft 1 in)
- Position: Forward

Youth career
- 2005: Talleres de Córdoba
- 2005–2008: Velez
- 2008–2009: River Plate

Senior career*
Years	Team	Apps	(Gls)
2009	River Plate	0	(0)
2009–2010	Maccabi Haifa	0	(0)
2010	Instituto	8	(0)
2010	Argentinos Juniors	0	(0)
2011	Emelec	12	(3)
2011–2012	Ferro Carril Oeste	4	(0)
2012–2013	Universidad de Guadalajara	23	(12)
2013–2014	Córdoba	9	(1)
2014–2015	Mérida	20	(3)
2015–2017	Talleres (C)	54	(19)
2017	Olimpo	10	(0)
2017–2018	Independiente Rivadavia	10	(1)
2018–2020	Almagro	6	(1)
2020	Sektzia Ness Ziona	7	(1)
2020–2022	Hapoel Bik'at HaYarden	54	(19)
2022–2023	Maccabi Herzliya	13	(4)
- * Club domestic league appearances and goals as of 5 July 2024

Eial Strahman (born 21 June 1989) is an Argentine footballer who plays for Maccabi Herzliya as a forward.

Strahman was considered one of River Plate's best talents to come through the youth system and is nicknamed "The Monster" for his aggressive instincts. He is a left-footed striker and of Jewish heritage, having represented Argentina at the 2005 Maccabiah Games.

== Club career ==
Strahman began through the youth ranks of Talleres de Córdoba, before moving to Vélez Sársfield, where he was the top scorer with 42 goals in 50 appearances for the youth team.

=== River Plate ===
Following his successful season at Vélez for the youth team, he joined River Plate, with Velez entitled to 40 per cent of any future transfer fee to a European club. Strahman made a strong start to his career at River Plate, scoring eight goals in his first five matches for the River Plate reserves. He was also an unused substitute in several of River Plate's final matches of the 2008-09 season. Strahman acquired the nickname "twitter" from his teammates because he is an avid user of this social network. Also, is rumored that he received a suspension for offending a referee in a tweet during a reserve match. This also lead to the decision to delete his account, but the name still prevailed.

=== Maccabi Haifa ===
Strahman signed with the Israeli champions just days after they had qualified for the UEFA Champions League with an aggregate win over Austrian team Red Bull Salzburg. His debut match for Haifa did not come though until 23 September 2009 in a Toto Cup match against Hapoel Petah Tikva. Strahman failed to make an impact on the match though and was substituted out in the 55th minute.

With the opening of the January transfer window, Maccabi Haifa released Strahman to Argentine club, Instituto.

=== Return to Argentina ===
On 6 February 2010, Eial Strahman made his debut for Instituto, coming on for Javier Correa in a league match against Independiente Rivadavia. A week later he got his first start against C.A.I. For the 2010–11 season, Strahman joined Argentinos Juniors, the reigning champion of the Argentine Primera División.

=== Mexico ===
On August 30, 2012, Strahman joined Club Universidad de Guadalajara in the Mexican Ascenso MX, the second-tier league on a one-year contract. After only starting two games in the Apertura 2012, he became key in the team's impressive unbeaten run in the first half of Clausura 2013, where he scored 7 goals in 8 games.

=== Spain ===
On 30 June 2013, Strahman signed with Córdoba CF in Segunda División, the Spanish second-tier.

=== Return to Israel ===
Strahman scored a goal for Sektzia Ness Ziona in a practice match in May 2020. Given the lack of other football being played, this goal made news in Argentina.

On 5 November 2020 loaned to the Liga Alef club Hapoel Bik'at HaYarden.

== International career ==
Strahman's international allegiance has not been decided yet, as he is eligible to play for both Argentina, his country of birth, and Israel. Strahman's father, Julio, spent ten years living in Israel from 1975 to 1985, and said of his son's international aspirations, "I have brought up my children to see Israel as their future home." Eial himself has said "I look forward to a future opportunity to play for Israel", but also remarked that "I think I am good enough to play for Argentina one day".

In May 2009, Strahman was called up to represent the Israel national under-21 football team in a European qualifier against Bulgaria, however his club refused to release him for the match, saying that he would be needed for the first team in June.

== Statistics ==
- Updated February 4, 2016

Club performance			League		Cup		League Cup		Continental		Total	
Season	Club	League	Apps	Goals	Apps	Goals	Apps	Goals	Apps	Goals	Apps	Goals
Israel			League		Israel State Cup		Toto Cup		Europe		Total	
2009–2010	Maccabi Haifa	Liga Al	0	0	0	0	2	0	0	0	2	0
Argentina			League		Cup		League Cup		South America		Total	
2009-2010	Instituto	Nacional B	8	0	0	0	0	0	0	0	8	0
2010-2011	Argentinos	Primera División	0	0	0	0	0	0	0	0	0	0
2011-2012	Ferro	B Nacional	4	0	0	0	0	0	0	0	4	0
2015	Talleres (C)	Federal A	30	14	0	0	0	0	0	0	30	14
2016	Talleres (C)	Nacional B	13	4	1	0	0	0	0	0	14	4
Total	Argentina		55	18	1	0	0	0	0	0	56	18
Total	Israel		0	0	0	0	2	0	0	0	2	0
Career total			55	18	1	0	2	0	0	0	58	18
