= Israel García (footballer, born 1999) =

Mexican footballer (born 1999)

Personal information
- Full name: Israel García Barreda
- Date of birth: 13 September 1999 (age 27)
- Place of birth: Martínez de la Torre, Veracruz, Mexico
- Height: 1.84 m (6 ft 0 in)
- Position: Midfielder

Team information
- Current team: Oaxaca
- Number: 8

Youth career
- –2012: Huracán de Tlapacoyan
- 2012–2020: América

Senior career*
Years	Team	Apps	(Gls)
2019–2020	América	1	(0)
2020–2021	→ Oaxaca (loan)	7	(0)
2025	Cañoneros	3	(3)
2026–	Oaxaca	21	(2)
- * Club domestic league appearances and goals as of 22 September 2026

Israel García Barreda (born 13 September 1999) is a Mexican professional footballer who plays as a midfielder for Liga de Expansión MX club Oaxaca.

== Club career ==
García began playing football at local club Huracán de Tlapacoyan, and was identified as a regional talent at a young age. He joined the América academy in 2012.

García made his competitive debut with the first team on 14 August 2019, coming on for Andrés Ibargüen during the second half of their 3–2 defeat to Atlanta United in the 2019 Campeones Cup. He then appeared in the Leagues Cup semifinals against Tigres UANL in Houston on August 20, where they lost in penalties. The nineteen-year-old was subsequently handed his Liga MX debut by manager Miguel "El Piojo" Herrera on 24 August replacing an injured Ibargüen in the early minutes of a 1–1 draw against Tigres UANL.

García signed a two-year extension with América in 2020, and was subsequently loaned out to Alebrijes de Oaxaca in the second-tier Liga de Expansión MX. He made six appearances with Oaxaca in the 2020–21 season before returning to América.

García joined Cañoneros of the third-tier Serie A de México in 2025, starting in their season opener against Chapulineros de Oaxaca. He scored a brace the following matchday, a 3–3 draw against Celaya.

== Career statistics ==
=== Club ===
As of 13 January 2021

Club	Season	League			Cup		Continental		Other		Total	
Club	Season	Division	Apps	Goals	Apps	Goals	Apps	Goals	Apps	Goals	Apps	Goals
América	2019–20	Liga MX	1	0	—		—		2 (Note: Appearances in the Campeones Cup and Leagues Cup)	0	3	0
Oaxaca	2020–21	Liga de Expansión MX	6	0	—		—		—		6	0
Career total			7	0	0	0	0	0	2	0	9	0
