= Diego Franco (footballer) =

Mexican footballer (born 1992)

Personal information
- Full name: Diego Alejandro Franco Mares
- Date of birth: 13 September 1992 (age 34)
- Place of birth: Mexico City, México
- Height: 1.78 m (5 ft 10 in)
- Position: Midfielder

Youth career
- 2009: Frailes Homape
- 2009–2013: Cruz Azul

Senior career*
Years	Team	Apps	(Gls)
2013	Cruz Azul	1	(0)
2013–2014	Cruz Azul Hidalgo	2	(0)
2014–2016	Atlético San Luis	6	(0)
2014–2016	→ Tepatitlán (loan)	18	(6)
2016–2017	Belén	16	(0)
2017–2018	Salamanca	7	(1)
2018–2019	University of Pretoria	7	(3)
2019–2021	Stellenbosch	8	(0)
2021	Steenberg United F.C.		
- * Club domestic league appearances and goals as of 19:00, 17 November 2019 (UTC)

Diego Alejandro Franco Mares (born 13 September 1992) is a former Mexican professional footballer who last played for Stellenbosch in the South African Premier Division.
