= Diego Esqueda =

Mexican footballer (born 1988)

Diego Armando Esqueda Osuna (born September 9, 1988, in Guadalajara, Jalisco, Mexico) is a former Mexican professional footballer who last played for Tampico Madero of Liga MX and former Kerala Blasters player.
