= César Cercado =

Mexican footballer (born 1989)

Personal information
- Full name: César Eduardo Cercado Luna
- Date of birth: 23 March 1989 (age 37)
- Place of birth: Puebla, Mexico
- Height: 1.70 m (5 ft 7 in)
- Position: Defender

Senior career*
Years	Team	Apps	(Gls)
2007–2019	BUAP	238	(6)
2011	→ Puebla (loan)	1	(0)
2012	→ Cruz Azul Hidalgo (loan)	7	(0)
2019–2020	Alebrijes de Oaxaca	14	(0)
2020	Tlaxcala	11	(0)
- * Club domestic league appearances and goals

César Eduardo Cercado Luna (born 23 March 1989) is a Mexican former professional footballer who played as a defender.

== Club career ==
At the age of 14, he joined the Lobos de la BUAP club, which represents the Meritorious Autonomous University of Puebla in the Promotion League. He has played there between 2006 and 2019. and then in 2011 transferred to Puebla F.C. on a 6-month loan deal. In 2019, Lobos BUAP was acquired by F.C. Juárez, after this, Cercado signed for Alebrijes de Oaxaca.
