= Freddy Martín =

Mexican footballer (born 1987)

Personal information
- Full name: Freddy Jesús Martín Mex
- Date of birth: 14 April 1987 (age 39)
- Place of birth: Mérida, Yucatán, Mexico
- Height: 1.80 m (5 ft 11 in)
- Position: Forward

Youth career
- 2007–2008: F.C. Itzaes Yucatán
- 2009: Mérida

Senior career*
Years	Team	Apps	(Gls)
2014–2020	Venados	109	(14)
2016	→ Dorados de Sinaloa (loan)	12	(1)
2017–2018	→ Dorados de Sinaloa (loan)	8	(0)
2019	→ Alebrijes de Oaxaca (loan)	6	(0)
2020	Halcones de Zapopan	0	(0)
- * Club domestic league appearances and goals as of 20 August 2019

Freddy Jesús Martín Mex (born 14 April 1987) is a Mexican former professional footballer who played as a forward.

== Personal life ==
Freddy's younger brother, Henry, is also a professional footballer who plays as a forward.
