= Miguel Cancela =

Mexican footballer (born 1993)

Personal information
- Full name: Miguel Ángel Cancela García
- Date of birth: 21 May 1993 (age 33)
- Place of birth: Xalapa, Veracruz, Mexico
- Height: 1.70 m (5 ft 7 in)
- Position: Defender

Youth career
- 2009–2010: Estudiantes de Xalapa
- 2010–2013: Albinegros de Orizaba

Senior career*
| Years | Team | Apps | (Gls) |
| 2012–2013 | La Piedad | 5 | (0) |
| 2013–2018 | Veracruz | 3 | (0) |
| 2015–2016 | → Cafetaleros(loan) | 11 | (1) |
| 2016 | → Albinegros (loan) | 14 | (0) |
| 2018 | → Albinegros (loan) | 8 | (0) |
| 2020 | Club Veracruzano de Fútbol Tiburón | 0 | (0) |
- * Club domestic league appearances and goals as of September 28, 2017

Miguel Ángel Cancela García (born 21 May 1993) is a Mexican footballer who played as a defender; his last club was Albinegros de Orizaba.
