= Fausto Ruiz =

Mexican footballer (born 1985)

Personal information
- Full name: Fausto David Ruiz Villalobos
- Date of birth: 25 April 1985 (age 41)
- Place of birth: San Luis Potosí, Mexico
- Height: 1.86 m (6 ft 1 in)
- Position: Centre-forward

Senior career*
Years	Team	Apps	(Gls)
2006-2009	Petroleros	43	(19)
2009-2010	Atlante UTN	32	(18)
2010-2013	San Luis Potosí	10	(5)
2011	→ Puerto Montt (loan)	25	(8)
2012	→ Dorados (loan)	19	(3)
2013	→ Lobos (loan)	1	(0)
2013-2014	Mérida	12	(1)
2014	Atlético San Luis	4	(0)
2015	Murciélagos	3	(1)
- * Club domestic league appearances and goals

Fausto David Ruiz Villalobos (born April 25, 1985, in San Luis Potosí, Mexico) is a Mexican former footballer who last played for Murciélagos.
