= Alonso Granados =

Mexican footballer (born 1986)

Personal information
- Full name: Alonso Alberto Granados Lozano
- Date of birth: 6 October 1986 (age 40)
- Place of birth: Cancún, Quintana Roo, Mexico
- Height: 1.72 m (5 ft 7 1/2 in)
- Position: Forward

Senior career*
Years	Team	Apps	(Gls)
2007–2009	Atlético Mexiquense	50	(3)
2009–2011	Toluca	2	(1)
2013–2015	Oaxaca	12	(0)
- * Club domestic league appearances and goals

Alonso Alberto Granados Lozano (Note: In this Spanish name, the first or paternal surname is Granados and the second or maternal family name is Lozano.) (born 6 October 1986) is a Mexican former professional footballer who played as a striker.
