= Raymundo Torres (footballer) =

Mexican footballer (born 1984)

Personal information
- Full name: Raymundo Torres Rangel
- Date of birth: 19 December 1984 (age 41)
- Place of birth: Guanajuato, Guanajuato, Mexico
- Height: 1.73 m (5 ft 8 in)
- Position: Midfielder

Senior career*
Years	Team	Apps	(Gls)
2004–2008	León	56	(7)
2008	Potros Chetumal	18	(2)
2008–2009	Atlante	4	(0)
2009–2010	Sinaloa	28	(3)
2010–2011	Durango	39	(3)
2011–2012	Correcaminos UAT	26	(3)
2012–2013	Atlante	6	(0)
2013	Mérida	6	(1)
2013–2014	Oaxaca	29	(6)
2014–2015	Atlante	5	(0)
2017–2018	Oaxaca	15	(3)
- * Club domestic league appearances and goals

Raymundo Torres Rangel (born December 19, 1984) is a Mexican former professional footballer who played as a midfielder.

== Career ==
Torres began playing competitive football for Club León of his home state of Guanajuato in the Mexican third division at age 14. After playing at Club León in the second division for many years, Torres moved to Atlante, where he debuted in Primera División on 5 October 2008 in a 2–0 win over Pumas UNAM.

Torres played professionally for 16 seasons in various levels of Mexican football. He appeared in 256 competitive matches for León, Atlante, Dorados de Sinaloa, Alacranes de Durango, Correcaminos UAT, C.F. Mérida and Alebrijes de Oaxaca.

After he retired from playing, Torres began working in the youth academy of Chapulineros de Oaxaca.
