= Luis Loroña =

Mexican footballer (born 1993)

Personal information
- Full name: Luis Guadalupe Loroña Aguilar
- Date of birth: 21 June 1993 (age 33)
- Place of birth: Caborca, Sonora, Mexico
- Height: 1.81 m (5 ft 11 in)
- Position: Forward

Team information
- Current team: Durango
- Number: 14

Youth career
- 2008–2010: Héroes de Caborca
- 2011–2013: Jaguares de Chiapas

Senior career*
Years	Team	Apps	(Gls)
2012–2013	Jaguares de Chiapas	17	(5)
2013–2014	Querétaro	27	(2)
2014–2015	Puebla	13	(1)
2015–2016	Chiapas	5	(0)
2016–2019	Sonora	47	(7)
2017–2018	→ UAT (loan)	24	(5)
2019	Loros UdeC	7	(0)
2020	Zacatepec	1	(0)
2020	Industriales Naucalpan F.C.	0	(0)
2021–2022	Tampico Madero	38	(9)
2022	Atlético La Paz	14	(2)
2023–2024	Cancún	31	(9)
2024–2025	Tepatitlán	42	(8)
2026	Pérez Zeledón	9	(0)
2026–	Durango	0	(0)
Medal record
Representing Mexico
Men's football
Olympic Qualifying Championship
Winner	2015 United States
- * Club domestic league appearances and goals as of 26 July 2024

Luis Guadalupe Loroña Aguilar (Note: In this Spanish name, the first or paternal surname is Loroña and the second or maternal family name is Aguilar.) (born 21 June 1993) is a Mexican professional footballer who plays as a forward for Liga de Expansión MX club Durango.

Loroña played with the Industriales Naucalpan F.C. of the Liga de Balompié Mexicano in 2020.

== Honours ==
Mexico U23

- CONCACAF Olympic Qualifying Championship: 2015
