= Alejandro Durán (footballer) =

Mexican footballer (born 1993)

Personal information
- Full name: Alejandro Durán Trejo
- Date of birth: 1 January 1993 (age 33)
- Place of birth: Mexico City, Mexico
- Height: 1.80 m (5 ft 11 in)
- Position: Midfielder

Senior career*
Years	Team	Apps	(Gls)
2014–2015	Jaguares F.C.	0	(0)
2015–2016	Cafetaleros de Chiapas	15	(0)
2016–2017	Jaguares F.C.	2	(0)
- * Club domestic league appearances and goals

Alejandro Durán Trejo (born January 1, 1993) is a Mexican professional footballer who last played for Gavilanes de Matamoros.
