= Fabián Cuellar =

Colombian footballer (born 1985)

Fabián Cuéllar
Personal information
- Full name: Fabián Andrés Cuéllar Trujillo
- Date of birth: June 21, 1985 (age 41)
- Place of birth: Neiva, Colombia
- Height: 1.71 m (5 ft 7 in)

Senior career*
Years	Team	Apps	(Gls)
2004–2007	Atlético Huila		
2007	Monagas	17	(1)
2008–2009	Atlético Huila		
2009	Santiago Morning	3	(0)
2010–2011	Deportivo Pereira	31	(2)
2011–2012	La Paz	22	(5)
2013	Cienciano	10	(0)
2013–2014	Oaxaca	8	(0)
2014–2015	Irapuato	10	(0)
- * Club domestic league appearances and goals

Fabián Andrés Cuéllar Trujillo (born June 21, 1985) is a Colombian former footballer who played as an attacking midfielder. He plays futsal in his homeland.

== Teams ==
- (Colombia) Atlético Huila 2004–2007
- (Venezuela) Monagas 2007
- (Colombia) Atlético Huila 2008–2009
- (Chile) Santiago Morning 2009
- (Colombia) Deportivo Pereira 2010–2011
- (Bolivia) La Paz 2011–2012
- (Peru) Cienciano 2013
- (Mexico) Alebrijes de Oaxaca 2013–2014
- (Mexico) Irapuato 2014–2015
