= Danny Santoya =

Colombian footballer (born 1988)

Personal information
- Full name: Danny Manuel Santoya Otero
- Date of birth: 24 April 1988 (age 38)
- Place of birth: Cartagena, Colombia
- Height: 1.84 m (6 ft 0 in)
- Position: Striker

Team information
- Current team: Deportes Quindío
- Number: 18

Senior career*
Years	Team	Apps	(Gls)
2008–2009	Deportes Quindío	30	(25)
2010	Once Caldas	27	(6)
2011	Deportes Tolima	47	(16)
2012	Medellín	18	(5)
2012–2013	Necaxa	38	(24)
2013	Deportes Quindío	17	(2)
2014–2016	Oaxaca	70	(32)
2016–2017	Sanat Naft Abadan	1	(0)
2017	Deportivo Municipal	7	(0)
2017	Unión Magdalena	7	(2)
2018–	Deportes Quindío	53	(16)
- * Club domestic league appearances and goals as of 19:38, 8 June 2020 (UTC)

Danny Manuel Santoya (born 24 April 1988) is a Colombian striker, who plays for Colombian side Deportes Quindío.
