= Alebrijes de Oaxaca =

Mexican football club

- Full name: Alebrijes de Oaxaca Fútbol Club
- Nickname: Alebrijes
- Short name: OAX, ALE
- Founded: 10 December 2012; 13 years ago
- Stadium: Estadio Tecnológico de Oaxaca
- Capacity: 14,598
- Owner: Medlamex S.A. de C.V.
- President: Juan Carlos Jones
- Manager: Gonzalo Bolaños
- League: Liga de Expansión MX
- Apertura 2026: Regular phase: 9th of 16; Final phase: Not qualified
- Website: www.alebrijesoaxaca.com
| Home colours | Away colours | Third colours |

Alebrijes de Oaxaca Fútbol Club is a professional football club based in Oaxaca. The club competes in Liga de Expansión MX, the second level of Mexican football, and plays its home matches at Estadio Tecnológico de Oaxaca. Founded in 2012 by acquiring the franchise of Tecamachalco F.C. and moved to Oaxaca due to poor infrastructure. The club's colors are black, white and orange.

Alebrijes de Oaxaca's debut in FMF competitions was in the Apertura 2013 tournament of the Ascenso MX, finishing first in the regular phase. The following year, the club finished as runners-up in the Clausura 2014 Copa MX.

== History ==
In the team's search for a new venue, the owners of the Tecamachalco franchise received support from the Oaxacan state government. They also received support from a group of businessmen led by Carlos Ojeda de Laredo, who wanted to bring professional football back to the state of Oaxaca.

On December 10, 2012, the president of the Primera División de México, the Liga de Ascenso de México, and Decio de María made the official announcement at the state capital building of the start of a new football club. The name of the club was changed to "Alebrijes" following a vote by the public. The new name refers to the colorful folk sculptures made in the state.

On July 20, 2013, they played their first Ascenso MX game, drawing 2–2 with Atlético San Luis. On April 9, 2014, Alebrijes lost the Clausura 2014 Copa MX finals against Tigres UANL by 3–0 at the Estadio Universitario.

On December 2, 2017, Oaxaca defeated FC Juárez on penalties to win the Apertura 2017 Ascenso MX tournament.

On May 28, 2019, Oaxaca had an administrative change, and the franchise belonging to Grupo Tecamachalco was paused for a year so that its owners could find a new city and remodel the administration of the club. Meanwhile, the franchise belonging to Zacatepec Siglo XXI (on hiatus between 2017 and 2019) was transferred to the city of Oaxaca to ensure the continuity of Alebrijes in the Ascenso MX. In the first tournament with the new board, the team won the championship by defeating Atlético Zacatepec with an aggregate score of 5–3, with this, the team won the second league title in its history, also being the last trophy awarded in the history of the Ascenso MX.

== Stadium ==
Alebrijes de Oaxaca play their home matches at the Estadio Tecnológico de Oaxaca in Oaxaca City, Oaxaca. The stadium capacity is 14,950 people. Its surface is covered by natural grass.

== Personnel ==
=== Coaching staff ===
| Position | Staff |
|---|---|
| Manager | (Mexico) Gonzalo Bolaños |
| Assistant managers | (Mexico) Efrén Hernández |
| Fitness coach | (Mexico) Antonio Durán |
| Goalkeeper coach | (Mexico) Alberto Becerra |
| Physiotherapist | (Mexico) Norberto Melchor |
| Team doctor | (Mexico) José Vargas |

== Players ==
=== First-team squad ===
As of 21 September 2026

Note: Flags indicate national team as defined under FIFA eligibility rules; some limited exceptions apply. Players may hold more than one non-FIFA nationality.

| No. | Pos. | Nation | Player |
|---|---|---|---|
| 1 | GK | MEX | Carlos Rodas |
| 2 | DF | MEX | Derick Keiser |
| 3 | DF | MEX | Adrián Justo |
| 4 | DF | MEX | Kristian Álvarez |
| 5 | DF | USA | Ethan López |
| 6 | MF | MEX | Aldo Arellano |
| 7 | FW | COL | Orlando Ballesteros |
| 8 | FW | MEX | Israel García |
| 10 | MF | MEX | Michelle Morales |
| 11 | FW | BRA | Andrey |
| 12 | DF | MEX | Josué Reyes |
| 13 | FW | MEX | Alfonso Valdez |
| 14 | DF | MEX | Adrián Vázquez |
| 15 | MF | MEX | Patrick Villa (on loan from América) |
| 16 | FW | MEX | Sergio Gallinar |
| 17 | DF | MEX | David Collazo |
| 18 | DF | MEX | Jhabdul González |

| No. | Pos. | Nation | Player |
|---|---|---|---|
| 19 | MF | SLE | Bubakarry Fadika |
| 20 | MF | MEX | David Ayala |
| 21 | GK | MEX | Octavio Paz |
| 22 | DF | MEX | Tristhan Jaimes |
| 23 | DF | MEX | Ángel Hernández |
| 24 | FW | USA | Princewill Achinulo |
| 25 | FW | MEX | Diego Martínez |
| 26 | MF | MEX | Miguel Carreón (on loan from América) |
| 27 | MF | MEX | Alfonso Sánchez |
| 28 | MF | USA | Luke Jeffus |
| 30 | MF | MEX | Jorge Alaniz |
| 31 | GK | MEX | Mario Fuentes |
| 32 | MF | MEX | Guillermo Arteaga |
| 33 | DF | MEX | Ángel Tecpanécatl |
| 34 | FW | COL | Wilson Torres |
| 35 | DF | MEX | Sebastián Vizarretea |
| 37 | DF | MEX | Luis Gutiérrez |

== Managers ==
- (Mexico) Ricardo Rayas (2013–15)
- (Mexico) Marco Antonio Trejo (Interim) (2015)
- (Mexico) Flavio Davino (2015–2016)
- (Mexico) Mario García Covalles (2016)
- (Mexico) Irving Rubirosa (2016–2018)
- (Mexico) Ricardo Rayas (2018–2019)
- (Mexico) Alex Diego (2019)
- (Mexico) Alejandro Pérez (2019–2020)
- (Mexico) Oscar Fernando Torres (2020–2021)
- (Mexico) Jorge Manrique (2021–2023)
- (Mexico) Carlos Gutiérrez (2023–2024)
- (Mexico) Arturo Alvarado (2024–2025)
- (Mexico) Efrén Hernández (2025–)

== Honours ==
Domestic
| Type | Competition | Titles | Seasons | Runners-up |
|---|---|---|---|---|
| Top level FMF | Copa MX | 0 | — | Cla–2014 |
| Lower levels FMF | Ascenso MX | 2 | Ape–2017, Ape–2019 | — |
| Lower levels FMF | Campeón de Ascenso | 0 | — | 2018 |

== Notable players ==
- (Argentina) Diego Menghi
- (Paraguay) Gustavo Ramírez
- (Venezuela) Giancarlo Maldonado
- (Mexico) Luis Madrigal
- (Mexico) Sergio Arias
- (Mexico) Alberto Medina
- (Mexico) Édgar Hernández
- (Uruguay) Lucero Álvarez

== Reserves ==
=== Alebrijes B/Alebrijes UABJO ===
The team competes in the Group II of the Liga TDP, and also participated in the Serie B of the Liga Premier, finishing as champions in the Clausura 2023 tournament, defeating T'HÓ Mayas 6–4 on aggregate, and finished as runners-up twice (Clausura 2022 and Apertura 2022). The team also won the Campeón de Campeones de la Liga Premier Serie B, defeating Club Calor 3–2 on penalties. The team changed its name to Alebrijes UABJO in 2022, due to a sports agreement with the Universidad Autónoma Benito Juárez de Oaxaca and it was also integrated into the university's sports structure.

=== Alebrijes CDMX ===
The team is based in Tlalpan, Mexico City, and competes in the Group VIII of the Liga TDP.

=== Alebrijes Teotihuacán ===
The team is based in Teotihuacán, State of Mexico, and competes in the Group IX of the Liga TDP.
