= 2021 Liga de Balompié Mexicano season =

Liga de Balompié Mexicano
- Season: 2021
- Dates: 21 August 2021 – 12 December 2021
- Champions: Chapulineros de Oaxaca (2nd title)
- Matches: 56
- Goals: 197 (3.52 per match)
- Top goalscorer: Víctor Lojero; Christian Nieves (15 goals)
- Biggest home win: Oaxaca 7–0 Furia Roja (4 September 2021)
- Biggest away win: Querétaro 0–5 Oaxaca (29 August 2021)
- Highest scoring: Oaxaca 7–0 Furia Roja (4 September 2021)
- Longest winning run: 4 matches Oaxaca
- Longest unbeaten run: 14 matches Oaxaca
- Longest winless run: 14 matches Atlético Capitalino
- Longest losing run: 14 matches Atlético Capitalino
- Stats are from the regular season only

The 2021 Liga de Balompié Mexicano season is the 2nd professional season of the most important league of competitions organized by the Asociación Nacional del Balompié Mexicano, a Mexican football federation affiliated with CONIFA. The season began on 21 August 2021.

== Offseason Changes ==
- Eight teams will participate in the league.
- Halcones de Querétaro and Real Tlamazolan joined the league as expansion teams.
- Acaxees de Durango, Club Veracruzano de Fútbol Tiburón, Los Cabos and San José continued for another year on hiatus because they did not meet the requirement of having a stable project to resume activity.
- Leones Dorados and Morelos had dissolved due to financial issues.
- Atlético Veracruz and Halcones de Zapopan left this league.

== Teams ==
=== Stadiums and locations ===
Liga de Balompié Mexicano Official Teams

Teams	City	Stadium	Capacity
Official members of ANBM
Atlético Capitalino	Atitalaquía, Hidalgo	Municipal de Atitalaquia (Note: Although the club registered the Estadio Valentín González in Mexico City as its official field, the team moved to Estadio Municipal de Atitalaquia in Atitalaquia, Hidalgo, due to problems in the originally proposed field use contract.)	3,000
Chapulineros de Oaxaca	San Jerónimo Tlacochahuaya, Oaxaca	Independiente MRCI	3,000
Furia Roja	Jesús María, Jalisco	Ramírez Nogales	600
Halcones de Querétaro	Cadereyta, Querétaro	Unidad Deportiva Cadereyta	1,100
Industriales Naucalpan	Naucalpan de Juárez, México	José Ortega Martínez	3,700
Jaguares de Jalisco	Zapopan, Jalisco	Complejo Deportivo Jaguares	3,000
Neza	Tultitlán, México	Deportivo Cartagena (Note: Although the club registered the Estadio Neza 86 in Ciudad Nezahualcóyotl as its official field, the team moved to Deportivo Cartagena in Tultitlán, due to problems in the originally proposed field use contract.)	3,000
Real Tlamazolan	Ciudad Guzmán, Jalisco	Olímpico de Ciudad Guzmán	3,700

=== Personnel and kits ===
Team	Chairman	Head coach	Kit manufacturer	Shirt sponsor(s)
Atlético Capitalino	(Mexico) Philippe Caire Toffano	(Argentina) Matías Rodríguez	Keuka	TBA
Chapulineros de Oaxaca	(Mexico) José María Ramírez	(Mexico) Omar Arellano	Felinus	MRCI
Furia Roja	TBA	(Mexico) Andrés González	Romed	Casa Don Ramón
Halcones de Querétaro	TBA	(Mexico) José Antonio Cruz	Keuka	TBA
Industriales Naucalpan	(Mexico) Leonardo Ramos Mateos	(Mexico) Ricardo Carbajal	Keuka	La BTK
Jaguares de Jalisco	(Mexico) Roberto Báez	(Mexico) Juan Pablo García	Dony Sports	TBA
Neza	(Mexico) Hugo Vázquez	(Mexico) Mario Rodríguez	UIN Sports	TBA
Real Tlamazolan	(Mexico) Pedro García	(Mexico) Jorge Martínez	Jarbet	TBA

== Regular season ==
=== Standings ===
Pos	Team	Pld	W	D	L	GF	GA	GD	Pts	Qualification or relegation
1	Oaxaca	14	13	1	0	42	9	+33	39	Final stage
2	Jaguares de Jalisco	14	10	1	3	37	15	+22	30	Final stage
3	Industriales Naucalpan	14	7	3	4	21	19	+2	24	Final stage
4	Furia Roja	14	6	3	5	27	24	+3	20	Final stage
5	Real Tlamazolan	14	6	2	6	20	20	0	16	
6	Halcones de Querétaro	14	4	2	8	21	35	−14	14	
7	Neza	14	3	2	9	16	28	−12	8	
8	Atlético Capitalino	14	0	0	14	13	47	−34	0	

Updated to match(es) played on 21 November 2021. Source: LBM

=== Positions by Round ===
Final stage
Last place

Team ╲ Round	1	2	3	4	5	6	7	8	9	10	11	12	13	14
Oaxaca	2	1	1	1	1	1	1	1	1	1	1	1	1	1
Jaguares	5	4	2	2	2	2	2	2	2	2	2	2	2	2
Naucalpan	3	6	6	6	6	6	4	5	5	4	4	3	3	3
Furia Roja	4	2	5	4	4	3	3	3	3	3	3	4	4	4
Tlamazolan	1	3	3	3	3	4	5	4	4	5	5	5	5	5
Querétaro	8	8	8	7	7	7	7	7	7	7	7	7	7	7
Neza	7	5	4	5	5	5	6	6	6	6	6	6	6	7
Atl. Capitalino	6	7	7	8	8	8	8	8	8	8	8	8	8	8

Updated to match(es) played on 21 November 2021. Source: LBM

=== Results ===
Home \ Away	ATC	CHA	FUR	HAL	IND	JAJ	NEZ	TLA
Atlético Capitalino	—	3–5	0–4	4–1	2–3	0–6	0–3	2–3
Chapulineros	4–1	—	7–0	4–1	3–1	1–0	1–0	4–0
Furia Roja	2–1	2–3	—	5–2	4–0	2–1	1–0	2–3
Halcones Querétaro	3–1	0–5	2–1	—	3–3	0–3	3–1	0–1
Industriales Naucalpan	2–0	0–1	1–1	3–0	—	0–3	2–0	1–0
Jaguares Jalisco	5–1	0–0	2–1	3–1	1–3	—	4–3	3–1
Neza	2–1	0–2	2–2	2–0	1–1	1–4	—	1–4
Real Tlamazolan	2–0	1–2	0–0	2–2	0–1	1–2	2–0	—

Updated to match(es) played on 21 November 2021. Source: LBM
Legend: Blue = home team win; Yellow = draw; Red = away team win.

=== Regular season statistics ===
==== Top goalscorers ====
Players sorted first by goals scored, then by last name.

Rank	Player	Club	Goals
1	(Mexico) Víctor Lojero	Oaxaca	15
1	(Mexico) Christian Nieves	Jaguares Jalisco	15
3	(Mexico) Juan Carlos Martínez	Furia Roja	10
4	(Mexico) Daniel Mendoza	Furia Roja	8
5	(Mexico) Omar Arellano	Oaxaca	6
6	(Mexico) Alejandro Castillo	Real Tlamazolan	5
6	(Colombia) Luis Páez	Neza	5
6	(Mexico) Gregorio Torres	Jaguares Jalisco	5
9	(Mexico) Cristián Bedoya	Industriales Naucalpan	4
9	(Mexico) Vicente Morales	Halcones de Querétaro	4

==== Hat tricks ====
Player	For	Against	Result	Date	Report
(Mexico) Roberto Daniel Ramírez	Industriales Naucalpan	Halcones de Querétaro	3 – 0 (H)	21 August 2021	
(Mexico) Víctor Lojero	Oaxaca	Furia Roja	7 – 0 (H)	4 September 2021	
(Mexico) Christian Nieves	Jaguares Jalisco	Neza	1 – 4 (A)	3 October 2021	
(Mexico) Víctor Lojero	Oaxaca	Atlético Capitalino	3 – 5 (A)	9 October 2021	
(Mexico) Christian Nieves	Jaguares Jalisco	Atlético Capitalino	0 – 6 (A)	30 October 2021	
(Mexico) Christian Nieves	Jaguares Jalisco	Neza	4 – 3 (H)	19 November 2021	

== Final stage ==
Semi–finals
1	Chapulineros de Oaxaca	0	4	4
4	Furia Roja	0	0	0
2	Jaguares de Jalisco	3	3	6
3	Industriales Naucalpan	2	1	3

Final
1	Chapulineros de Oaxaca	1	1	2
2	Jaguares de Jalisco	0	1	1

=== Semi-finals ===
Team 1	Agg.	Team 2	1st leg	2nd leg
Chapulineros de Oaxaca	4–0	Furia Roja	0–0	4–0
Jaguares de Jalisco	6–3	Industriales Naucalpan	3–2	3–1

==== First leg ====
24 November 2021	Industriales Naucalpan	2–3	Jaguares de Jalisco	Naucalpan de Juárez, México
12:00 CST (UTC−6)	Mondragón 4'; Zapata 21'	Report	Galván 28', 87'; Anguiano 89'	Stadium: Estadio José Ortega Martínez

24 November 2021	Furia Roja	0–0	Chapulineros de Oaxaca	Jesús María, Jalisco
16:00 CST (UTC−6)		Report		Stadium: Estadio Ramírez Nogales

==== Second leg ====
27 November 2021	Chapulineros de Oaxaca	4–0 (4–0 agg.)	Furia Roja	San Jerónimo Tlacochahuaya, Oaxaca
16:00 CST (UTC−6)	Estala 14'; García 77'; Pedroza 88'; Ochoa 89'	Report		Stadium: Estadio Independiente MRCI

27 November 2021	Jaguares de Jalisco	3–1 (6–3 agg.)	Industriales Naucalpan	Zapopan, Jalisco
18:00 CST (UTC−6)	Damián 1'; Jayasi 17'; Torres 63'	Report	Sebastián 75'	Stadium: Complejo Deportivo Jaguares

=== Final ===
Team 1	Agg.	Team 2	1st leg	2nd leg
Chapulineros de Oaxaca	2–1	Jaguares de Jalisco	1–0	1–1

==== First leg ====
5 December 2021	Jaguares de Jalisco	0–1	Chapulineros de Oaxaca	Zapopan, Jalisco
12:00 CST (UTC−6)		Report	Ávalos 33'	Stadium: Complejo Deportivo Jaguares

==== Second leg ====
12 December 2021	Chapulineros de Oaxaca	1–1 (2–1 agg.)	Jaguares de Jalisco	San Jerónimo Tlacochahuaya, Oaxaca
12:00 CST (UTC−6)				Stadium: Estadio Independiente MRCI

2021 winners
Chapulineros de Oaxaca
2nd title

== See also ==
- Liga de Balompié Mexicano
