= 2022 Liga de Balompié Mexicano season =

Liga de Balompié Mexicano
- Season: 2022
- Dates: 1 April 2022 – 2 July 2022
- Matches played: 49
- Goals scored: 224 (4.57 per match)
- Top goalscorer: Víctor Lojero (22 goals)
- Biggest home win: Halcones de Querétaro 11–1 Industriales Naucalpan (11 June 2022)
- Biggest away win: Industriales Naucalpan 0–9 Halcones de Querétaro (24 April 2022)
- Highest scoring: Halcones de Querétaro 11–1 Industriales Naucalpan (11 June 2022)
- Longest winning run: 6 matches Chapulineros de Oaxaca
- Longest unbeaten run: 9 matches Neza
- Longest winless run: 6 matches Industriales Naucalpan
- Longest losing run: 5 matches Inter de Amecameca
- Stats are from the regular season only

The 2022 Liga de Balompié Mexicano season was the 3rd professional season of the most important league of competitions organized by the Asociación Nacional del Balompié Mexicano, a Mexican football federation affiliated with CONIFA. The season began on 1 April 2022 and finished on 2 July 2022.

== Offseason Changes ==
- Eight teams will participate in the league.
- Inter de Amecameca and Mezcaleros de Oaxaca joined the league as expansion teams.
- Jaguares de Jalisco and Real Tlamazolan withdrew from the league.
- Two tournaments will be played in the season: League and Cup. In the league, the championship will be awarded to the team that scores the most points in the regular season. While the Cup will be played by direct elimination between the eight clubs in the division. The two champions will play a match to determine the best club of the season.
- On May 16, 2022 Atlético Capitalino was expelled from the league for not complying with the rules of the competition.

== Teams ==
Liga de Balompié Mexicano Official Teams

Teams	City	Stadium	Capacity
Official members of ANBM
Atlético Capitalino	Mexico City	Deportivo Plutarco Elías Calles	300
Chapulineros de Oaxaca	San Jerónimo Tlacochahuaya, Oaxaca	Independiente MRCI	3,000
Furia Roja	Jesús María, Jalisco	Ramírez Nogales	600
Halcones de Querétaro	Cadereyta, Querétaro	Unidad Deportiva Cadereyta	1,100
Industriales Naucalpan	Naucalpan de Juárez, México	Jesús Martínez "Palillo"	6,000
Inter de Amecameca	Amecameca, State of Mexico	Francisco Flores	3,000
Mezcaleros de Oaxaca	San Jerónimo Tlacochahuaya, Oaxaca	Independiente MRCI	3,000
Neza	Ciudad Nezahualcóyotl, México	Deportivo Cartagena	3,000

== League ==
=== Standings ===
Pos	Team	Pld	W	D	L	GF	GA	GD	Pts	Qualification or relegation
1	Chapulineros de Oaxaca (C)	13	10	2	1	45	14	+31	32	League Champions
2	Halcones de Querétaro	13	9	3	1	60	17	+43	30	League Cup
3	Neza	13	8	3	2	36	13	+23	27	League Cup
4	Furia Roja	13	6	3	4	26	16	+10	21	
5	Mezcaleros de Oaxaca	13	5	1	7	31	28	+3	16	League Cup
6	Industriales Naucalpan	13	2	1	10	16	57	−41	7	League Cup
7	Inter de Amecameca	13	2	1	10	10	58	−48	7	
8	Atlético Capitalino (Note: On May 16, 2022 Atlético Capitalino was expelled from the league for not complying with the rules of the competition. All results were awarded to the opponent with a score of 3–0.)	7	0	0	7	0	21	−21	0	Disaffiliated

Updated to match(es) played on 2 July 2022. Source: LBM
(C) Champions

=== Positions by Round ===
Champions
Last place in table

Team ╲ Round	1	2	3	4	5	6	7	8	9	10	11	12	13	14
Chapulineros	1	1	1	1	1	1	1	2†	1	1	1	2	3	1
Querétaro	4	4	5	3	3	3	3	3	3†	4	3	3	1	2
Neza	3	2	3	2	2	2	2	1	2	2	2	1	2†	3
Furia Roja	6	3	4	6	6	6	4	4	4	3	4†	4	4	4
Mezcaleros	2	5	2	4	4	4	5	5	5	5	5	5†	5	5
Naucalpan	5	6	7	7	7	8	7	7	7	7	7	7	6	6†
Amecameca	7	8	8	8	8	7	6	6	6	6†	6	6	7	7
Atlético Capitalino	8	7	6	5	5	5	8	8	8	8	8	8	8	8

Updated to match(es) played on 2 July 2022. Source: LBM
Notes: † indicates team rested that round

=== Results ===
Home \ Away	ATC	CHA	FUR	HAL	IND	INT	MEZ	NEZ
Atlético Capitalino (Note: On May 16, 2022 Atlético Capitalino was expelled from the league for not complying with the rules of the competition. All results were awarded to the opponent with a score of 3–0.)	—	—	0–3	0–3	—	—	—	0–3
Chapulineros	3–0	—	4–1	3–3	6–0	6–0	2–2	1–0
Furia Roja	—	0–2	—	0–3	1–1	9–0	2–0	1–1
Halcones Querétaro	—	2–5	3–2	—	11–1	6–0	5–1	2–2
Industriales Naucalpan	3–0	0–4	1–2	0–9	—	3–0	2–4	0–6
Inter Amecameca	3–0	0–5	0–0	0–8	4–2	—	3–4	0–2
Mezcaleros	3–0	2–2	0–3	1–3	6–0	5–0	—	2–3
Neza	—	3–0	1–2	2–2	4–3	8–0	1–0	—

Updated to match(es) played on 2 July 2022. Source: LBM
Legend: Blue = home team win; Yellow = draw; Red = away team win.

=== Regular season statistics ===
==== Top goalscorers ====
Players sorted first by goals scored, then by last name.

Rank	Player	Club	Goals
1	(Mexico) Alfonso Nieto	Halcones de Querétaro	22
2	(Mexico) Víctor Lojero	Chapulineros de Oaxaca	17
3	(Mexico) Miguel Rojas	Mezcaleros de Oaxaca	13
4	(Mexico) Brayan Alcántar	Industriales Naucalpan	7
4	(Mexico) Juan Carlos Martínez	Furia Roja	7
4	(Colombia) Luis Páez	Neza	7
4	(Mexico) Donys Rodríguez	Neza	7
4	(Mexico) Brayan Sanclemente	Halcones de Querétaro	7
9	(Mexico) Yoset Gerónimo	Halcones de Querétaro	6
9	(Mexico) Arturo Navarro	Furia Roja	6

==== Hat tricks ====
Player	For	Against	Result	Date	Report
(Colombia) Luis Páez	Neza	Inter Amecameca	8 – 0 (H)	8 April 2022	
(Mexico) Víctor Lojero	Chapulineros de Oaxaca	Industriales Naucalpan	0 – 4 (A)	10 April 2022	
(Mexico) Alfonso Nieto	Halcones de Querétaro	Industriales Naucalpan	0 – 9 (A)	24 April 2022	
(Mexico) Alfonso Nieto	Halcones de Querétaro	Inter Amecameca	0 – 8 (A)	29 April 2022	
(United States) Jaime Frías	Furia Roja	Inter Amecameca	9 – 0 (H)	14 May 2022	
(Mexico) Juan Carlos Martínez	Furia Roja	Inter Amecameca	9 – 0 (H)	14 May 2022	
(Mexico) Alfonso Nieto	Halcones de Querétaro	Industirales Naucalpan	11 – 1 (H)	18 June 2022	

== Cup ==
The league decided to hold a cup tournament between four teams participating in the league.

Semi–finals
2	Halcones de Querétaro	8
6	Industriales Naucalpan	0
3	Neza	0
5	Mezcaleros de Oaxaca	3

Finals
2	Halcones de Querétaro	4
5	Mezcaleros de Oaxaca	2

=== Semi–finals ===
6 July 2022	Neza	0–3	Mezcaleros de Oaxaca	Ixtapaluca, State of Mexico
15:00 CDT (UTC−5)		Report	Rojas 67'; Gonzáles 83'; Rosario 84'	Stadium: Deportivo Valle Verde

7 July 2022	Halcones de Querétaro	8–0	Industriales Naucalpan	Querétaro City, Querétaro
12:00 CDT (UTC−5)	Unk. 19' (own); Merlos 32'; Saldaña 47'; Morales 62'; Gerónimo 73', 87'; Nieto 79'	Report		Stadium: Complejo Deportivo INDEREQ

=== Final ===
10 July 2022	Halcones de Querétaro	4–2	Mezcaleros de Oaxaca	El Marqués, Querétaro
12:00 CDT (UTC−5)	Sanclemente 42', 58'; Nieto 59', 75'	Report	Rojas 34', 90+1'	Stadium: Unidad Deportiva La Cañada

== Champions Trophy ==
The champions trophy will face league winners against cup winners.

16 July 2022	Chapulineros de Oaxaca	3–2	Halcones de Querétaro	San Jerónimo Tlacochahuaya, Oaxaca
16:00 CDT (UTC−5)	Lojero 5'; Maldonado 15'; Ávalos 28'	Report	Orbe 8'; González 54'	Stadium: Estadio Independiente MRCI

== See also ==
- Liga de Balompié Mexicano
