= 2023 Liga de Balompié Mexicano season =

Liga de Balompié Mexicano
- Season: 2023
- Dates: 10 February 2023 – 25 November 2023
- Champions: 2023-A: Chapulineros de Oaxaca (4th title); 2023–B: Chapulineros de Oaxaca (5th title)
- Promoted: Toros México
- Matches: 80
- Goals: 302 (3.78 per match)
- Top goalscorer: 2023-A: Víctor Lojero (18 goals); 2023–B: Víctor Lojero (10 goals)
- Biggest home win: 2023-A: Chapulineros de Oaxaca 11–0 EFIX Soccer Club (4 March 2023); 2023-B: Chapulineros de Oaxaca 18–1 EFIX Soccer Club (30 September 2023)
- Biggest away win: 2023-A: Lobos MX 0–5 Neza (26 February 2023); 2023-B: EFIX Soccer Club 0–4 Chapulineros de Oaxaca (19 August 2023)
- Highest scoring: 2023-A: Chapulineros de Oaxaca 11–0 EFIX Soccer Club (4 March 2023); 2023-B: Chapulineros de Oaxaca 18–1 EFIX Soccer Club (30 September 2023)
- Longest winning run: 2023-A: 5 matches Cóndor FC; Neza; 2023–B: 7 matches Chapulineros de Oaxaca
- Longest unbeaten run: 2023-A: 7 matches Neza; 2023–B: 7 matches Chapulineros de Oaxaca; Neza
- Longest winless run: 2023-A: 8 matches EFIX Soccer Club; 2023–B: 7 matches Hidalgo
- Longest losing run: 2023-A: 8 matches EFIX Soccer Club; 2023–B: 2 matches EFIX Soccer Club; Hidalgo; Inter Amecameca
- Stats are from the regular season only

The 2023 Liga de Balompié Mexicano season was composed of the 4th and 5th professional seasons of the most important league of competitions organized by the Asociación Nacional del Balompié Mexicano, a Mexican football federation affiliated with CONIFA. The season began on 10 February 2023 and finished on 25 November 2023.

This is the first time that two tournaments have been held per season, abandoning the annual tournament format that had been held since the league's founding in 2020.

== Offseason changes ==
- 10 teams participated in the league.
- Cóndor FC, EFIX Soccer Club and RED entered the league as expansion teams.
- Halcones de Querétaro withdrew from the LBM due to financial problems, but the reserve team remained in the Segunda División del Balompié Mexicano.
- Toros México was promoted from the Segunda División del Balompié Mexicano.
- The format of the league changed, now the ten participating teams were divided into two groups taking the geographical location as division criteria. The two group winners qualify directly for the semifinals, while the second and third place advance to the reclassification stage.

=== 2023–B season changes ===
- 12 teams will participate in the league.
- From 2023–B season two teams joined the league as expansion franchises: Hidalgo F.C. and Kundavi F.C.
- Inter Ixtapaluca was relocated to Amecameca and renamed Inter Amecameca.
- Lobos MX was renamed Lobos CARH.

== Teams ==
Liga de Balompié Mexicano Official Teams
Liga de Balompié Mexicano 2023 Official Teams (Greater Mexico City)

Teams	City	Stadium	Capacity
Official members of ANBM
Chapulineros de Oaxaca	San Jerónimo Tlacochahuaya, Oaxaca	Independiente MRCI	3,000
Cóndor FC	Cuautinchán, Puebla	El Cóndor	500
EFIX Soccer Club	Xalapa, Veracruz	Instalaciones Deportivas EFIX	TBA
Industriales Naucalpan	Tlalnepantla, State of Mexico	Deportivo Barrientos	1,000
Inter Amecameca	Amecameca, State of Mexico	Francisco Flores	2,000
Lobos CARH	Chalco, State of Mexico	Arreola	3,000
Mezcaleros de Oaxaca	San Jerónimo Tlacochahuaya, Oaxaca	Independiente MRCI	3,000
Neza	Iztacalco, Mexico City	Jesús Martínez "Palillo"	6,000
RED	Iztacalco, Mexico City	Jesús Martínez "Palillo"	6,000
Toros México FC	Álvaro Obregón, Mexico City	Deportivo Valentín Gómez Farías	500

=== 2023–B season new teams ===
Teams	City	Stadium	Capacity
Hidalgo	Atitalaquía, Hidalgo	Municipal de Atitalaquia	3,000
Kundavi	Río Grande, Oaxaca	Inocente Santos Luna	1,000

== 2023–A tournament ==
=== Group 1 ===
==== Standings ====
Pos	Team	Pld	W	D	L	GF	GA	GD	BP	Pts	Qualification or relegation
1	Neza	8	7	1	0	26	3	+23	0	22	Qualification to semi-finals
2	Toros México	8	5	0	3	16	9	+7	0	15	Qualification to Reclassification
3	Industriales Naucalpan	8	3	2	3	14	14	0	0	11	Qualification to Reclassification
4	RED	8	3	0	5	13	19	−6	0	9	
5	Lobos MX	8	0	1	7	9	33	−24	0	1	

Updated to match(es) played on 23 April 2023. Source: LBM

==== Positions by round ====
Semi–finals
Reclassification

Team ╲ Round	1	2	3	4	5	6	7	8	9	10
Neza	2	1	1	1	1†	1	1	1	1	1†
Toros México	5	3	4	4†	2	3	2	2	2†	2
Industriales Naucalpan	3†	5	3	2	4	4†	4	4	4	3
RED	1	2	2†	3	3	2	3	3†	3	4
Lobos MX	4	4†	5	5	5	5	5†	5	5	5

Updated to match(es) played on 23 April 2023. Source: LBM
Notes: † indicates team rested that round

==== Results ====
Home \ Away	IND	LOB	NEZ	RED	TOR
Industriales Naucalpan	—	2–2	0–0	2–1	3–2
Lobos MX	1–4	—	0–5	2–4	0–2
Neza	3–1	6–0	—	3–0	3–1
RED	3–2	4–2	1–5	—	0–2
Toros México	2–0	4–2	0–1	1–0	—

Updated to match(es) played on 23 April 2023. Source: LBM
Legend: Blue = home team win; Yellow = draw; Red = away team win.

=== Group 2 ===
==== Standings ====
Pos	Team	Pld	W	D	L	GF	GA	GD	BP	Pts	Qualification or relegation
1	Cóndor FC	8	6	1	1	29	6	+23	0	19	Qualification to semi-finals
2	Chapulineros de Oaxaca	8	6	0	2	34	4	+30	0	18	Qualification to Reclassification
3	Mezcaleros de Oaxaca	8	3	2	3	11	14	−3	0	11	Qualification to Reclassification
4	Inter Ixtapaluca	8	3	1	4	12	26	−14	0	10	
5	EFIX Soccer Club	8	0	0	8	1	37	−36	0	0	

Updated to match(es) played on 23 April 2023. Source: LBM

==== Positions by round ====
Semi–finals
Reclassification

Team ╲ Round	1	2	3	4	5	6	7	8	9	10
Cóndor FC	1	2†	1	1	1	1	1†	1	1	1
Chapulineros de Oaxaca	3†	1	3	2	2	4†	3	2	2	2
Mezcaleros de Oaxaca	4	3	4†	4	3	2	2	3†	3	3
Inter Ixtapaluca	2	4	2	3†	4	3	4	4	4†	4
EFIX Soccer Club	5	5	5	5	5†	5	5	5	5	5†

Updated to match(es) played on 23 April 2023. Source: LBM
Notes: † indicates team rested that round

==== Results ====
Home \ Away	CHA	CON	EFI	INT	MEZ
Chapulineros de Oaxaca	—	3–1	11–0	10–0	3–0
Cóndor FC	2–0	—	9–0	7–0	4–1
EFIX Soccer Club	0–4	0–1	—	1–4	0–3
Inter Ixtapaluca	0–3	0–3	3–0	—	2–2
Mezcaleros de Oaxaca	1–0	2–2	2–0	0–3	—

Updated to match(es) played on 23 April 2023. Source: LBM
Legend: Blue = home team win; Yellow = draw; Red = away team win.

=== Regular season statistics ===
==== Top goalscorers ====
Players sorted first by goals scored, then by last name.

Rank	Player	Club	Goals
1	(Mexico) Víctor Lojero	Chapulineros de Oaxaca	18
2	(Mexico) Vicente Morales	Neza	8
3	(Mexico) Alfonso Nieto	Neza	7
4	(Mexico) Gilberto Castillo	RED	5
4	(Mexico) Jorge Padilla	Cóndor FC	5
4	(Colombia) Donys Rodríguez	Cóndor FC	5
7	(Mexico) Hugo Amaro	Inter Ixtapaluca	4
8	(Mexico) Omar Arellano	Chapulineros de Oaxaca	3
8	(Mexico) Yoset Gerónimo	Neza	3
8	(Mexico) Gustavo Hernández	Inter Ixtapaluca	3
8	(Colombia) Luis Páez	Neza	3

Source:[]

==== Hat-tricks ====
Player	For	Against	Result	Date	Round	Reference
(Colombia) Donys Rodríguez	Cóndor FC	EFIX Sóccer Club	9 – 0 (H)	12 February 2023	1	
(Mexico) Víctor Lojero	Chapulineros de Oaxaca	Inter Ixtapaluca	10 – 0 (H)	18 February 2023	2	
(Mexico) Víctor Lojero	Chapulineros de Oaxaca	EFIX Soccer Club	11 – 0 (H)	4 March 2023	4	

(H) – Home; (A) – Away

=== League table ===
Pos	Team	Pld	W	D	L	GF	GA	GD	BP	Pts	Qualification or relegation
1	Neza	8	7	1	0	26	3	+23	0	22	Qualification to semi-finals
2	Cóndor FC	8	6	1	1	29	6	+23	0	19	Qualification to semi-finals
3	Chapulineros de Oaxaca	8	6	0	2	34	4	+30	0	18	Qualification to Reclassification
4	Toros México	8	5	0	3	16	9	+7	0	15	Qualification to Reclassification
5	Mezcaleros de Oaxaca	8	3	2	3	11	14	−3	0	11	Qualification to Reclassification
6	Industriales Naucalpan	8	3	2	3	14	14	0	0	11	Qualification to Reclassification
7	Inter Ixtapaluca	8	3	1	4	12	26	−14	0	10	
8	RED	8	3	0	5	13	19	−6	0	9	
9	Lobos MX	8	0	1	7	9	33	−24	0	1	
10	EFIX Soccer Club	8	0	0	8	1	37	−36	0	0	

Updated to match(es) played on 22 April 2023. Source: LBM

=== Play–offs ===
==== Reclassification ====
28 April 2023	Toros México	5–0	Mezcaleros de Oaxaca	Álvaro Obregón, Mexico City
10:00 CST (UTC−6)	Castillo 13', 41', 57'; Oteo 25'; Mondragón 54'	Report		Stadium: Deportivo Valentín Gómez Farías

29 April 2023	Chapulineros de Oaxaca	8–0	Industriales Naucalpan	San Jerónimo Tlacochahuaya, Oaxaca
12:00 CST (UTC−6)	Estala 29', 39', 58'; Ávalos 31'; Maldonado 55'; Lojero 67'; Arellano 70'; Rojas 86'	Report		Stadium: Estadio Independiente MRCI

==== Final stage ====
Semi–finals
1	Neza	1	2	3
4	Toros México	1	1	2
2	Cóndor FC	0	2	2
3	Chapulineros de Oaxaca	3	1	4

Final
1	Neza	2	1	3
3	Chapulineros de Oaxaca	3	1	4

===== Semi-finals =====
The first legs were played on 5 and 6 May, and the second legs will be played on 12 and 14 May 2023.

Team 1	Agg.	Team 2	1st leg	2nd leg
Neza	3–2	Toros México	1–1	2–1
Cóndor FC	2–4	Chapulineros de Oaxaca	0–3	2–1

First leg

5 May 2023	Toros México	1–1	Neza	Álvaro Obregón, Mexico City
11:00 CST (UTC−6)	Mendoza 62'	Report	Medina 80'	Stadium: Deportivo Valentín Gómez Farías

6 May 2023	Chapulineros de Oaxaca	3–0	Cóndor FC	San Jerónimo Tlacochahuaya, Oaxaca
12:00 CST (UTC−6)	Maldonado 18'; Estala 54'; Lojero 63'	Report		Stadium: Estadio Independiente MRCI

Second leg

12 May 2023	Neza	2–1 (3–2 agg.)	Toros México	Texcoco, State of Mexico
15:00 CST (UTC−6)	Morales 13'; Nieto 89'	Report	Dávila 3'	Stadium: Estadio Municipal Claudio Suárez

14 May 2023	Cóndor FC	2–1 (2–4 agg.)	Chapulineros de Oaxaca	Cuautinchán, Puebla
12:00 CST (UTC−6)	Torres 28'; González 49'	Report	Lojero 20'	Stadium: Complejo Deportivo Cóndor

===== Final =====
Team 1	Agg.	Team 2	1st leg	2nd leg
Neza	3–4	Chapulineros de Oaxaca	2–3	1–1

First leg

20 May 2023	Chapulineros de Oaxaca	3–2	Neza	Oaxaca City, Oaxaca
17:00 CST (UTC−6)	Estala 5', 86'; Lojero 57'	Report	Tobón 50'; Morales 54'	Stadium: Estadio Tecnológico de Oaxaca

Second leg

27 May 2023	Neza	1–1 (3–4 agg.)	Chapulineros de Oaxaca	Cuautitlán, State of Mexico
16:00 CST (UTC−6)	Morales 20'	Report	Lojero 3'	Stadium: Estadio Los Pinos

2023 winners

4th title

== 2023–B tournament ==
=== Group 1 ===
==== Standings ====
Pos	Team	Pld	W	D	L	GF	GA	GD	BP	Pts	Qualification or relegation
1	Neza	10	7	3	0	21	5	+16	0	24	Qualification to Reclassification
2	Cóndor FC	10	7	1	2	22	10	+12	0	22	Qualification to Reclassification
3	Toros México	10	4	4	2	17	17	0	0	16	Qualification to Reclassification
4	Industriales Naucalpan	10	2	3	5	10	16	−6	−1	8	
5	Hidalgo	10	2	1	7	12	17	−5	0	7	
6	RED	10	0	4	6	5	22	−17	−1	3	

Updated to match(es) played on 21 October 2023. Source: LBM

==== Positions by round ====
Semi–finals
Reclassification

Team ╲ Round	1	2	3	4	5	6	7	8	9	10
Neza	4	2	1	2	1	1	1	1	1	1
Cóndor FC	1	3	4	3	3	3	3	2	2	2
Toros México	2	1	2	1	2	2	2	3	3	3
Industriales	3	4	3	4	4	5	5	5	5	4
Hidalgo	5	6	6	6	6	6	6	4	4	5
RED	6	5	5	5	5	4	4	6	6	6

Updated to match(es) played on 21 October 2023. Source: LBM
Notes: † indicates team rested that round

==== Results ====
Home \ Away	CON	HID	IND	NEZ	RED	TOR
Cóndor FC	—	3–2	2–0	1–1	3–0	4–1
Hidalgo	1–2	—	1–2	0–1	1–1	2–3
Industriales Naucalpan	0–3	2–3	—	0–1	0–0	2–2
Neza	4–1	2–0	1–1	—	4–0	3–0
RED	1–0	1–1	0–3	0–2	—	2–2
Toros México	1–0	1–0	3–0	2–2	2–2	—

Updated to match(es) played on 21 October 2023. Source: LBM
Legend: Blue = home team win; Yellow = draw; Red = away team win.

=== Group 2 ===
==== Standings ====
Pos	Team	Pld	W	D	L	GF	GA	GD	BP	Pts	Qualification or relegation
1	Chapulineros de Oaxaca	10	10	0	0	62	6	+56	0	30	Qualification to Semi-finals
2	Kundavi	10	8	0	2	30	10	+20	0	24	Qualification to Semi-finals
3	Mezcaleros de Oaxaca	10	4	2	4	11	17	−6	0	14	Qualification to Reclassification
4	Lobos CARH	10	2	3	5	10	25	−15	0	9	
5	Inter Amecameca	10	1	2	7	6	28	−22	0	5	
6	EFIX Soccer Club	10	1	1	8	8	41	−33	0	4	

Updated to match(es) played on 21 October 2023. Source: LBM

==== Positions by round ====
Semi–finals
Reclassification

Team ╲ Round	1	2	3	4	5	6	7	8	9	10
Chapulineros de Oaxaca	1	1	1	1	1	1	1	1	1	1
Kundavi	2	2	2	2	2	2	2	2	2	2
Mezcaleros de Oaxaca	5	4	4	3	3	3	3	3	3	3
Lobos CARH	3	3	3	4	4	4	4	4	4	4
Inter Amecameca	6	6	6	6	6	6	6	5	5	5
EFIX Soccer Club	4	5	5	5	5	5	5	6	6	6

Updated to match(es) played on 21 October 2023. Source: LBM
Notes: † indicates team rested that round

==== Results ====
Home \ Away	CHA	EFI	INT	KUN	LOB	MEZ
Chapulineros de Oaxaca	—	18–1	7–0	5–2	8–0	5–0
EFIX Soccer Club	0–4	—	1–0	2–4	0–1	0–2
Inter Amecameca	0–5	3–1	—	0–3	1–1	1–2
Kundavi	0–1	5–0	5–0	—	3–0	3–1
Lobos CARH	2–5	3–2	1–1	1–3	—	1–1
Mezcaleros de Oaxaca	1–4	1–1	2–0	0–2	1–0	—

Updated to match(es) played on 21 October 2023. Source: LBM
Legend: Blue = home team win; Yellow = draw; Red = away team win.

=== League table ===
Pos	Team	Pld	W	D	L	GF	GA	GD	BP	Pts	Qualification or relegation
1	Chapulineros de Oaxaca	10	10	0	0	62	6	+56	0	30	Qualification to Semi-finals
2	Kundavi	10	8	0	2	30	10	+20	0	24	Qualification to Semi-finals
3	Neza	10	7	3	0	21	5	+16	0	24	Qualification to Reclassification
4	Cóndor FC	10	7	1	2	22	10	+12	0	22	Qualification to Reclassification
5	Toros México	10	4	4	2	17	17	0	0	16	Qualification to Reclassification
6	Mezcaleros de Oaxaca	10	4	2	4	11	17	−6	0	14	Qualification to Reclassification
7	Lobos CARH	10	2	3	5	10	25	−15	0	9	
8	Industriales Naucalpan	10	2	3	5	10	16	−6	−1	8	
9	Hidalgo	10	2	1	7	12	17	−5	0	7	
10	EFIX Soccer Club	10	1	1	8	8	41	−33	0	4	
11	RED	10	0	4	6	5	22	−17	−1	3	
12	Inter Amecameca	10	1	2	7	6	28	−22	0	5	

Updated to match(es) played on 21 October 2023. Source: LBM

=== Play–offs ===
==== Reclassification ====
28 October 2023	Cóndor FC	1–1 (5–4 p)	Toros México	Cuautinchán, Puebla
15:00 CST (UTC−6)	Padilla 42'	Report	Mondragón 63'	Stadium: Complejo Deportivo Cóndor

28 October 2023	Neza	2–0	Mezcaleros de Oaxaca	Tultitlán, State of Mexico
15:00 CST (UTC−6)	Macías 1'; Mosquera 54'	Report		Stadium: Deportivo Cartagena

==== Final stage ====
Semi–finals
1	Chapulineros de Oaxaca	0	4	4
4	Cóndor FC	0	1	1
2	Kundavi	1	1	2
3	Neza	2	1	3

Final
1	Chapulineros de Oaxaca	2	3	5
3	Neza	1	1	2

===== Semi–finals =====
Team 1	Agg.	Team 2	1st leg	2nd leg
Chapulineros de Oaxaca	4–1	Cóndor FC	0–0	4–1
Kundavi	2–3	Neza	1–2	1–1

First leg

4 November 2023	Neza	2–1	Kundavi	Chalco, State of Mexico
12:00 CST (UTC−6)	Zuloaga 17'; Nieto 19'	Report	Carlos 90+2'	Stadium: Estadio Arreola

5 November 2023	Cóndor FC	0–0	Chapulineros de Oaxaca	Cuautinchán, Puebla
12:00 CST (UTC−6)		Report		Stadium: Complejo Deportivo Cóndor

Second leg

11 November 2023	Kundavi	1–1 (2–3 agg.)	Neza	Río Grande, Oaxaca
15:30 CST (UTC−6)	Silva 73'	Report	Nieto 38'	Stadium: Estadio Inocente Santos Luna

11 November 2023	Chapulineros de Oaxaca	4–1	Cóndor FC	San Jerónimo Tlacochahuaya, Oaxaca
15:30 CST (UTC−6)	Lojero 31', 38', 63'; Bello 88'	Report	Padilla 90'	Stadium: Estadio Independiente MRCI

===== Final =====
Team 1	Agg.	Team 2	1st leg	2nd leg
Chapulineros de Oaxaca	5–2	Neza	2–1	3–1

First leg

18 November 2023	Neza	2–1	Chapulineros de Oaxaca	Chalco, State of Mexico
15:30 CST (UTC−6)	Nieto 5'	Report	Guarch 61'; Arellano 90+5'	Stadium: Estadio Arreola

Second leg

25 November 2023	Chapulineros de Oaxaca	3–1 (5–2 agg.)	Neza	San Jerónimo Tlacochahuaya, Oaxaca
15:30 CST (UTC−6)	Ávalos 3'; Lojero 22'; Ruíz 49'	Report	Nieto 90'	Stadium: Estadio Independiente MRCI

2023–B winners

5th title

== See also ==
- Liga de Balompié Mexicano
