= Richard Okunorobo =

Mexican footballer (born 1988)

Personal information
- Full name: Richard Okunorobo Islas
- Date of birth: 14 August 1988 (age 38)
- Place of birth: Puebla, Mexico
- Height: 1.91 m (6 ft 3 in)
- Position: Centre back

Youth career
- 2007: Real San Cosme
- 2008: Angeles Comsbmra

Senior career*
Years	Team	Apps	(Gls)
2008–2009	Lobos Prepa	0	(0)
2010	Cuautla	13	(2)
2010–2013	Querétaro		
2012–2013	→ Delfines (loan)		
2013–2017	Lobos BUAP	14	(0)
2015–2016	→ Ventura County Fusion (loan)		
2018	Dorados de Sinaloa	12	(0)
2018	Alebrijes de Oaxaca	0	(0)
2019	Universitario	7	(0)
2019	Venados	1	(0)
2020	Industriales Naucalpan F.C.	0	(0)
2021–2024	Chapulineros de Oaxaca	0	(0)
- * Club domestic league appearances and goals as of 6 August 2019

Richard Okunorobo Islas (born 14 August 1988) is a former Mexican professional footballer who last played for Venados in the Ascenso MX.

== Early life ==
Okunorobo was born in Puebla to a Nigerian father and Mexican mother.

== Club career ==
Okunorobo played with the Chapulineros de Oaxaca of the Liga de Balompié Mexicano in 2021.

== Honours ==
=== Club ===
Chapulineros de Oaxaca

- Liga de Balompié Mexicano: 2021
