= 1998–99 Primera División A season =

Season of a Mexican football league

Ascenso MX
- Season: 1998–99
- Champions: Apertura: Yucatán (1st Title); Clausura: Unión de Curtidores (1st title)
- Promoted: Unión de Curtidores
- Relegated: San Francisco
- Top goalscorer: Invierno: Cristián Ariel Morales (19); Verano: Ángel Lemus (16)

Primera División A (Méxican First A Division) is a Mexican football tournament. This season was composed of Invieno 1998 and Verano 1999. Unión de Curtidores, Verano 1999 champion, were able to gain promotion to Primera Division for the 1999-2000 season after winning the playoff to Yucatán, Invierno 1998 champion. However, the Puebla F.C. acquired the franchise belonging to Union de Curtidores to remain in the First Division.

== Changes for the 1998–99 season ==
- Tampico Madero was disaffiliated by the FMF.
- Gallos de Aguascalientes was promoted by winning the 1997–98 Second Division season.
- Veracruz was relegated from Primera División.
- Tecos Colima renamed Jaguares de Colima.

== Stadiums and locations ==
Location of teams in the 1998–99 Primera División A

Club	Stadium	Capacity	City
Aguascalientes	Municipal de Aguascalientes	12,500	Aguascalientes, Aguascalientes
Atlético Mexiquense	Nemesio Díez	35,000	Toluca, State of Mexico
Bachilleres	Jalisco	60,000	Guadalajara, Jalisco
Chivas Tijuana	Cerro Colorado	12,000	Tijuana, Baja California
Cruz Azul Hidalgo	10 de Diciembre	17,000	Cruz Azul, Hidalgo
Correcaminos UAT	Marte R. Gómez	20,000	Ciudad Victoria, Tamaulipas
Cuautitlán	Los Pinos	8,000	Cuautitlán, State of Mexico
Halcones de Querétaro	Corregidora	35,000	Querétaro, Querétaro
Irapuato	Sergio León Chávez	26,000	Irapuato, Guanajuato
Jaguares de Colima	Colima	12,000	Colima, Colima
La Piedad	Juan N. López	15,000	La Piedad, Michoacán
Real San Luis	Plan de San Luis	18,000	San Luis Potosí, S.L.P.
RS Zacatecas	Francisco Villa	18,000	Zacatecas, Zacatecas
Saltillo	Francisco I. Madero	10,000	Saltillo, Coahuila
San Francisco	San Francisco	11,500	San Francisco del Rincón, Guanajuato
Tigrillos	Estadio Universitario	40,000	San Nicolás de los Garza, Nuevo León
Unión de Curtidores	La Martinica	12,000	León, Guanajuato
Veracruz	Luis "Pirata" Fuente	33,000	Veracruz, Veracruz
Yucatán	Carlos Iturralde	24,000	Mérida, Yucatán
Zacatepec	Agustín Coruco Díaz	18,000	Zacatepec, Morelos

== Invierno 1998 ==
=== Group league tables ===
==== Group 1 ====
Pos	Team	Pld	W	D	L	GF	GA	GD	Pts
1	Veracruz	19	8	6	5	40	31	+9	30
2	Correcaminos UAT	19	7	7	5	30	29	+1	28
3	Jaguares de Colima	19	7	2	10	27	32	−5	23
4	Tigrillos	19	4	8	7	23	23	0	20
5	Halcones	19	2	14	3	26	30	−4	20

Source: Memoria Futbolera (subscription required)
Rules for classification: 1st points; 2nd goal difference; 3rd goals scored; 4th head-to-head; 5th away goals scored; 6th draw

==== Group 2 ====
Pos	Team	Pld	W	D	L	GF	GA	GD	Pts
1	Irapuato	19	10	5	4	47	32	+15	35
2	Yucatán	19	10	4	5	36	32	+4	34
3	Chivas Tijuana	19	7	6	6	27	28	−1	27
4	Unión de Curtidores	19	6	7	6	31	29	+2	25
5	RS Zacatecas	19	6	5	8	36	39	−3	23

Source: Memoria Futbolera (subscription required)
Rules for classification: 1st points; 2nd goal difference; 3rd goals scored; 4th head-to-head; 5th away goals scored; 6th draw

==== Group 3 ====
Pos	Team	Pld	W	D	L	GF	GA	GD	Pts
1	Aguascalientes	19	11	3	5	33	30	+3	36
2	Real San Luis	19	7	6	6	40	29	+11	27
3	Bachilleres	19	7	5	7	29	33	−4	26
4	Cuautitlán	19	6	3	10	32	37	−5	21
5	Atlético Mexiquense	19	4	7	8	31	39	−8	19

Source: Memoria Futbolera (subscription required)
Rules for classification: 1st points; 2nd goal difference; 3rd goals scored; 4th head-to-head; 5th away goals scored; 6th draw

==== Group 4 ====
Pos	Team	Pld	W	D	L	GF	GA	GD	Pts
1	Cruz Azul Hidalgo	19	8	7	4	34	29	+5	31
2	Zacatepec	19	5	9	5	41	39	+2	24
3	San Francisco	19	6	6	7	22	26	−4	24
4	La Piedad	19	5	5	9	30	39	−9	20
5	Saltillo	19	3	7	9	25	35	−10	16

Source: Memoria Futbolera (subscription required)
Rules for classification: 1st points; 2nd goal difference; 3rd goals scored; 4th head-to-head; 5th away goals scored; 6th draw

=== General league table ===
Pos	Team	Pld	W	D	L	GF	GA	GD	Pts
1	Aguascalientes	19	11	3	5	33	30	+3	36
2	Irapuato	19	10	5	4	47	32	+15	35
3	Yucatán	19	10	4	5	36	32	+4	34
4	Cruz Azul Hidalgo	19	8	7	4	34	29	+5	31
5	Veracruz	19	8	6	5	40	31	+9	30
6	Correcaminos UAT	19	7	7	5	30	29	+1	28
7	Real San Luis	19	7	6	6	40	29	+11	27
8	Chivas Tijuana	19	7	6	6	27	28	−1	27
9	Bachilleres	19	7	5	7	29	33	−4	26
10	Unión de Curtidores	19	6	7	6	31	29	+2	25
11	Zacatepec	19	5	9	5	41	39	+2	24
12	San Francisco	19	6	6	7	22	26	−4	24
13	RS Zacatecas	19	6	5	8	36	39	−3	23
14	Jaguares de Colima	19	7	2	10	27	32	−5	23
15	Cuautitlán	19	6	3	10	32	37	−5	21
16	Tigrillos	19	4	8	7	23	23	0	20
17	Halcones	19	2	14	3	26	30	−4	20
18	La Piedad	19	5	5	9	30	39	−9	20
19	Atlético Mexiquense	19	4	7	8	31	39	−8	19
20	Saltillo	19	3	7	9	25	35	−10	16

Source: Memoria Futbolera (subscription required)
Rules for classification: 1st points; 2nd goal difference; 3rd goals scored; 4th head-to-head; 5th away goals scored; 6th draw

=== Results ===
Home \ Away	AGS	AMX	BAC	CHT	CRH	CUA	HAL	IRA	JAG	LAP	RSL	RSZ	SAL	SFR	TIG	UAT	UDC	VER	YUC	ZAC
Aguascalientes		2–1	3–3	2–0		1–3	2–2			2–0	2–1			2–1					1–0	
At. Mexiquense				1–1				0–2	3–1			1–3	2–2		2–2	0–2	1–2	3–2		4–4
Bachilleres		2–0		1–2			1–2					2–2		2–0	1–0	2–2	1–0			2–2
Chivas Tijuana					2–1			2–1	2–1			1–2	1–1		1–0	1–1	3–0	3–4		2–2
Cruz Azul Hidalgo	1–1	2–1	6–2			2–0	1–1			3–1	0–4			1–1					5–1	
Cuautitlán		1–3	0–2	4–1			1–1					2–2		4–2	0–0		2–1			5–1
Halcones		1–1		0–0				1–4				2–2	2–1		1–1	2–2	1–2	3–3		1–1
Irapuato	1–2		5–2		1–1	5–2			2–0	4–1	3–3		2–1					2–2	3–2	
Jaguares	0–2		1–2		0–1	5–2	1–1			2–1	2–1			3–2					1–2	
La Piedad		3–3	0–0	2–2		3–1	3–1					2–1		0–1	2–0		0–0			
Real San Luis		2–0	3–1	2–1		3–2	2–2			5–0				1–2	3–1		1–2			
RS Zacatecas	1–2				3–4			1–3	2–1		2–2		1–1			1–2		5–2	1–2	3–2
Saltillo	4–0		0–1		0–1	2–1			1–2	0–6	1–1			0–1					3–4	
San Francisco		1–1		1–2			1–1	1–0				2–3			2–1	1–0	2–2	0–0		1–1
Tigrillos	1–2				5–0			1–1	2–2			2–0	2–2			2–3		1–0	0–0	1–0
UAT	1–3				2–2	1–0		0–2	1–0	3–2	2–2		1–1					2–0	2–2	
Unión de Curtidores	3–1				1–1			3–3	1–2			4–1	1–2		1–1	4–2		3–3		1–1
Veracruz	2–1		1–0		2–1	1–2			3–1	6–0	1–1		4–1						2–0	
Yucatán		5–2	3–2	2–0		1–0	1–1			2–2	3–2			2–0			1–0			
Zacatepec	4–2				1–1			7–3	1–2	3–1	2–1		2–2			0–2		2–2	5–3	

Updated to match(es) played on 22 November 1998. Source: Memoria Futbolera (subscription required)
Legend: Blue = home team win; Yellow = draw; Red = away team win.

=== Reclassification series ===
Team 1	Agg.	Team 2	1st leg	2nd leg
Chivas Tijuana	2–2 (Note: Chivas Tijuana advanced to the Liguilla because they scored more points in the tournament.)	Zacatepec	0–2	2–0

=== Liguilla ===
Quarter-finals
3	Yucatán (p.t.)	0	2	2
6	Correcaminos UAT	2	0	2
4	Cruz Azul Hidalgo	1	2	3
5	Veracruz	2	2	4
2	Irapuato	0	5	5
7	Real San Luis	0	0	0
1	Aguascalientes	0	0	0
8	Chivas Tijuana	1	0	1

Semi-finals
3	Yucatán	1	2	3
5	Veracruz	1	0	1
2	Irapuato	1	0	1
8	Chivas Tijuana	0	2	2

Final
3	Yucatán	0	1	1
8	Chivas Tijuana	0	0	0

Invierno 1998 winners
Yucatán
1st title

=== Top scorers ===
Scorer	Goals	Team
(Argentina) Cristián Ariel Morales	19	Irapuato
(Uruguay) Daniel Fasciolli	17	Veracruz
(Brazil) Emmanuel Sacramento	15	Cuautitlán
(Mexico) José Luis Malibrán	14	Yucatán
(Mexico) Israel Ayala	13	San Luis

Last updated: 22 November 1998.
Source: Memoria Futbolera (subscription required)

== Verano 1999 ==
=== Group league tables ===
==== Group 1 ====
Pos	Team	Pld	W	D	L	GF	GA	GD	Pts
1	Correcaminos UAT	19	6	9	4	24	19	+5	27
2	Jaguares de Colima	19	6	7	6	20	26	−6	25
3	Halcones	19	6	4	9	34	35	−1	22
4	Veracruz	19	5	6	8	27	28	−1	21
5	Tigrillos	19	5	4	10	23	21	+2	19

Source: Memoria Futbolera (subscription required)
Rules for classification: 1st points; 2nd goal difference; 3rd goals scored; 4th head-to-head; 5th away goals scored; 6th draw

==== Group 2 ====
Pos	Team	Pld	W	D	L	GF	GA	GD	Pts
1	Unión de Curtidores	19	11	4	4	33	23	+10	37
2	Irapuato	19	9	5	5	35	22	+13	32
3	Chivas Tijuana	19	7	7	5	27	22	+5	28
4	Yucatán	19	7	6	6	24	20	+4	27
5	RS Zacatecas	19	7	1	11	30	35	−5	22

Source: Memoria Futbolera (subscription required)
Rules for classification: 1st points; 2nd goal difference; 3rd goals scored; 4th head-to-head; 5th away goals scored; 6th draw

==== Group 3 ====
Pos	Team	Pld	W	D	L	GF	GA	GD	Pts
1	Cuautitlán	19	8	4	7	35	30	+5	28
2	Aguascalientes	19	7	4	8	27	32	−5	25
3	Atlético Mexiquense	19	6	4	9	28	39	−11	22
4	Bachilleres	19	4	8	7	30	39	−9	20
5	Real San Luis	19	4	7	8	28	36	−8	19

Source: Memoria Futbolera (subscription required)
Rules for classification: 1st points; 2nd goal difference; 3rd goals scored; 4th head-to-head; 5th away goals scored; 6th draw

==== Group 4 ====
Pos	Team	Pld	W	D	L	GF	GA	GD	Pts
1	Zacatepec	19	11	0	8	29	26	+3	33
2	Cruz Azul Hidalgo	19	9	5	5	37	23	+14	32
3	La Piedad	19	9	5	5	22	26	−4	32
4	Saltillo	19	8	4	7	23	24	−1	28
5	San Francisco	19	5	6	8	20	31	−11	21

Source: Memoria Futbolera (subscription required)
Rules for classification: 1st points; 2nd goal difference; 3rd goals scored; 4th head-to-head; 5th away goals scored; 6th draw

=== General league table ===
Pos	Team	Pld	W	D	L	GF	GA	GD	Pts
1	Unión de Curtidores	19	11	4	4	33	23	+10	37
2	Zacatepec	19	11	0	8	29	26	+3	33
3	Cruz Azul Hidalgo	19	9	5	5	37	23	+14	32
4	Irapuato	19	9	5	5	35	22	+13	32
5	La Piedad	19	9	5	5	22	26	−4	32
6	Cuautitlán	19	8	4	7	35	30	+5	28
7	Chivas Tijuana	19	7	7	5	27	22	+5	28
8	Saltillo	19	8	4	7	23	24	−1	28
9	Correcaminos UAT	19	6	9	4	24	19	+5	27
10	Yucatán	19	7	6	6	24	20	+4	27
11	Aguascalientes	19	7	4	8	27	32	−5	25
12	Jaguares de Colima	19	6	7	6	20	26	−6	25
13	Halcones	19	6	4	9	34	35	−1	22
14	RS Zacatecas	19	7	1	11	30	35	−5	22
15	Atlético Mexiquense	19	6	4	9	28	39	−11	22
16	Veracruz	19	5	6	8	27	28	−1	21
17	San Francisco	19	5	6	8	20	31	−11	21
18	Bachilleres	19	4	8	7	30	39	−9	20
19	Tigrillos	19	5	4	10	23	21	+2	19
20	Real San Luis	19	4	7	8	28	36	−8	19

Source: Memoria Futbolera (subscription required)
Rules for classification: 1st points; 2nd goal difference; 3rd goals scored; 4th head-to-head; 5th away goals scored; 6th draw

=== Results ===
Home \ Away	AGS	AMX	BAC	CHT	CRH	CUA	HAL	IRA	JAG	LAP	RSL	RSZ	SAL	SFR	TIG	UAT	UDC	VER	YUC	ZAC
Aguascalientes					3–2			0–1	0–0			2–1	3–1		1–0	0–3	1–2	2–1		1–0
At. Mexiquense	0–1		2–2		3–3	2–1	0–2			0–1	0–3			3–2					2–1	
Bachilleres	1–1				0–3	3–1		2–2	1–2	2–2	2–1		3–2					3–3	1–1	
Chivas Tijuana	3–2	3–0	1–1			6–1	2–1			1–2	2–1			0–0					1–1	
Cruz Azul Hidalgo				1–1				0–2	4–0			2–1	3–2		2–1	1–1	4–0	4–2		2–1
Cuautitlán	5–2				1–0			1–4	3–0	4–0	1–1		2–0			2–2		1–1	2–1	
Halcones	3–2		6–2		1–1	0–3			1–1	2–3	4–1			1–0					1–1	
Irapuato		4–1		2–2			1–1					4–1		2–0	3–2	1–1	1–1			2–3
Jaguares		1–4		1–0				2–1				4–2	1–2		1–1	1–1	0–2	1–1		2–0
La Piedad	2–2				1–0			1–0	0–0		3–1		0–1			1–0		1–1	2–1	2–0
Real San Luis	2–2				2–4			1–4	1–1			3–2	0–0			1–1		1–3	1–1	2–0
RS Zacatecas		6–2	3–1	2–3		1–1	2–1			3–1				0–2	1–0		2–0			
Saltillo		0–1		1–0			1–4	2–0				3–0			2–2	1–0	1–1	1–0		2–1
San Francisco	3–2		2–2		1–1	1–5			2–0	0–0	1–1		2–0						3–2	
Tigrillos		0–1	2–0	0–1		2–1	3–1			2–1	0–1			0–0			4–1			
UAT		2–1	2–1	0–0			2–1					2–1		4–0	1–1		1–1			1–3
Unión de Curtidores		1–1	1–2	1–0		3–0	2–0			3–0	5–4			3–0					2–0	
Veracruz		2–2		1–1			3–2	0–1				1–2		3–0	2–0	1–0	2–3			0–1
Yucatán	2–0				1–0			1–0	0–2			2–0	1–1		1–0	1–1		2–0		4–1
Zacatepec		4–3	2–1	4–0		1–0	5–2					1–0		2–1	1–0		0–1			

Updated to match(es) played on 15 May 1999. Source: Memoria Futbolera (subscription required)
Legend: Blue = home team win; Yellow = draw; Red = away team win.

=== Reclassification series ===
Team 1	Agg.	Team 2	1st leg	2nd leg
Chivas Tijuana	3–0	Gallos de Aguascalientes	0–0	3–0
Reboceros de La Piedad	4–1	Jaguares de Colima	0–1	4–0

=== Liguilla ===
Quarter-finals
1	Unión de Curtidores	4	1	5
8	Correcaminos UAT	3	1	4
4	Irapuato	0	4	4
5	La Piedad	0	1	1
2	Zacatepec	0	5	5
7	Chivas Tijuana	1	0	1
3	Cruz Azul Hidalgo (p.t.)	1	2	3
6	Cuautitlán	1	2	2

Semi-finals
1	Unión de Curtidores	0	5	5
4	Irapuato	1	2	3
2	Zacatepec	0	3	3
3	Cruz Azul Hidalgo	2	2	4

Final
1	Unión de Curtidores	1	2	3
3	Cruz Azul Hidalgo	1	1	2

Verano 1999 winners
Unión de Curtidores
1st title

=== Top scorers ===
Scorer	Goals	Team
(Mexico) Ángel Lemus	16	Real San Luis
(Argentina) Cristián Ariel Morales	15	Irapuato
(Argentina) Juan Manuel Zandoná	14	Halcones
(Mexico) Christian Patiño	13	Unión de Curtidores
(Argentina) Pablo Bocco	13	Real San Luis

== Relegation table ==
Pos.	Team	Pld.	Pts.	Ave.
16.	Chivas Tijuana	78	91	1.1666
17.	Jaguares de Colima	78	88	1.1010
18.	Halcones de Querétaro	78	85	1.0887
19.	Cuautitlán	110	114	1.0363
20.	Atlético San Francisco	110	112	1.0181

== Campeón de Ascenso 1999 ==
At the end of the season, the two champions played a final to determine the winner of the promotion to Primera División. The series faced Yucatán, champion of the Invierno 1998 tournament against Unión de Curtidores, champion of the Verano 1999 tournament.

Team 1	Agg.	Team 2	1st leg	2nd leg
Unión de Curtidores	7–1	Yucatán	2–0	5–1

=== First leg ===
17 June 1999	Yucatán	0–2	Unión de Curtidores	Mérida, Yucatán
20:00		Report	Oviedo 16', 25'	Stadium: Estadio Carlos Iturralde; Attendance: 18,000; Referee: León Padró Borja

=== Second leg ===
20 June 1999	Unión de Curtidores	5–1 (7–1 agg.)	Yucatán	León, Guanajuato
12:00	Ordiales 10'; Oviedo 26', 83'; Madrigal 53'; Patiño 59'	Report	Salcedo 51'	Stadium: Estadio León; Attendance: 33,000; Referee: Armando Archundia

Champions
Unión de Curtidores
1st title
