= Gregorio Torres =

Mexican footballer (born 1985)

Personal information
- Full name: Gregorio Isidro Torres Ramírez
- Date of birth: 3 September 1985 (age 41)
- Place of birth: Guadalajara, Jalisco, Mexico
- Height: 1.70 m (5 ft 7 in)
- Position: Midfielder

Senior career*
Years	Team	Apps	(Gls)
2005–2007	CF Atlas	28	(1)
2007	Cruz Azul	6	(0)
2008	CF Atlas	0	(0)
2008–2009	Santos Laguna	8	(2)
2009–2010	C.F. Pachuca	14	(0)
2010–2014	Atlas	38	(3)
2010–2012	→ Club León (loan)	18	(2)
2014–2015	Correcaminos UAT	2	(0)
2015–2016	Venados F.C.	5	(0)
2016–2018	Real Estelí	75	(48)
2020–2021	Jaguares de Jalisco	0	(0)
- * Club domestic league appearances and goals as of 1 July 2017

Gregorio Isidro Torres Ramírez (Note: In this Spanish name, the first or paternal surname is Torres and the second or maternal family name is Ramírez.) (born 3 September 1985) is a Mexican former professional footballer who played as a midfielder.

== Career ==
Torres began his playing career in 2005 with the team Coyotes de Sonora in the Primera Division A. He signed with Atlas later in the year, and made his professional debut on April 8, 2006, in a 3–3 tie between the Zorros and Santos Laguna, the team Torres is currently playing for. He scored his first professional goal on November 4, 2006. It was the game winner, as Torres came off the bench to score in the 79th minute. Atlas beat Necaxa, 2–1.

"Goyo", as he is nicknamed, was traded to Cruz Azul in 2007, but failed to garnish enough playing time. After returning to Atlas and not playing a single game, he was traded to Santos in 2008. He has seen plenty of action in the CONCACAF Champions League for Santos, playing in 6 games and scoring 2 goals against C.S.D. Municipal and Tauro FC.

He played with the Jaguares de Jalisco of the Liga de Balompié Mexicano, leading them to a runner-up finish in the 2021 season.
