= Alfredo Juraidini =

Mexican footballer (born 1994)

Personal information
- Full name: Alfredo Juraidini Riloba
- Date of birth: 19 September 1994 (age 32)
- Place of birth: Teziutlán, Puebla, Mexico
- Height: 1.73 m (5 ft 8 in)
- Position: Right-back

Youth career
- Puebla

Senior career*
Years	Team	Apps	(Gls)
2013–2018	Puebla	0	(0)
2016	→ River Plate Asunción (loan)		
2018	→ Potros UAEM (loan)	3	(0)
2018–2019	Salam Zgharta	10	(0)
2019–2020	Ansar	0	(0)
2020–2021	Atlético Capitalino		
2021	Shabab Sahel	2	(0)
2022	Tlaxcala	10	(0)
- * Club domestic league appearances and goals as of 22:31, 24 April 2021 (UTC)

Alfredo Juraidini Riloba (born 19 September 1994) is a Mexican professional footballer who plays as a right-back. Mexican at birth, Juraidini also obtained Lebanese citizenship through his origins.

== Club career ==
Juraidini made his professional debut with Puebla against Altamira on 7 August 2013. He scored his first goal with the club in the Clausura 2014 Copa MX against Atletico San Luis, on 2 February 2014. After trialing with River Plate Asunción, Juraidini signed for the club. The player returned to Puebla on 1 July 2016. Juraidini moved on a short-term loan to Potros UAEM during the 2018 Ascenso MX Clausura.

On 16 January 2019, Juraidini moved to Lebanese Premier League side Salam Zgharta to compete in the second leg of the 2018–19 season. On 28 August 2019, he joined Ansar on a one-year contract for the 2019–20 season.

On 5 September 2020, Juraidini moved back to Mexico, joining Atlético Capitalino in the newly formed Liga de Balompié Mexicano. He returned to Lebanon on 17 January 2021, joining Shabab Sahel to play in the second half of the 2020–21 season. In 2022, he played for Tlaxcala.

== Honours ==
Puebla

- Copa Pachuca: 2013
- Copa MX: 2015
- Supercopa MX: 2015
