= Alan García (footballer) =

Mexican footballer (born 1993)

Personal information
- Full name: Alan García Chávez
- Date of birth: 27 April 1993 (age 33)
- Place of birth: Mexico City, Mexico
- Height: 1.78 m (5 ft 10 in)
- Position: Attacking midfielder

Youth career
- 2010–2013: Toluca

Senior career*
Years	Team	Apps	(Gls)
2014–2016	Necaxa	3	(0)
2016–2017	Atlético Estado de México	24	(2)
2017–2018	Pioneros de Cancún	44	(8)
2019–2020	Tlaxcala	16	(1)
2020–2022	Chapulineros de Oaxaca	0	(0)
- * Club domestic league appearances and goals as of 4 October 2019

Alán García Chávez (born 27 April 1993) is a Mexican professional footballer who plays for Tlaxcala F.C. of Liga Premier de México on loan from Necaxa.

== Trajectory ==
He emerged from the basic forces of Club Necaxa playing for a while in the U-20 basic forces of Deportivo Toluca and played in all categories and divisions with the rays until he made his debut on Wednesday, 21 January 2015 in a defeat against Club Tijuana in a match corresponding to the Copa México Clausura 2015, and later he would make his debut in the promotion in the home victory against Dorados de Sinaloa in matchday seven, he was runner-up in the promotion in his season of arrival.

His record so far includes 13 official matches, two of them in the Clausura 2015, six in the Copa México Clausura 2015, one in the current championship and four more in the Copa México Apertura 2015.

== Honours ==
=== Club ===
Chapulineros de Oaxaca

- Liga de Balompié Mexicano: 2021
