= Marvin Piñón =

Mexican footballer (born 1991)

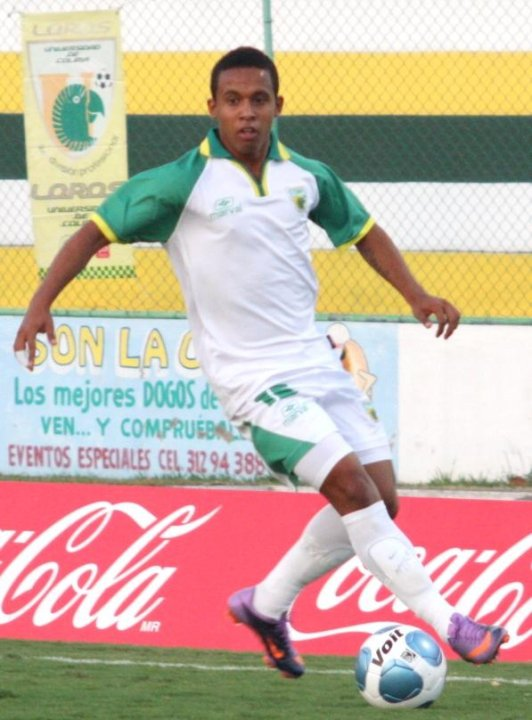
- Piñon playing for Loros UdeC

Personal information
- Full name: Marvin Leonardo Piñón Polanco
- Date of birth: 12 June 1991 (age 35)
- Place of birth: Altamira, Tamaulipas, Mexico
- Height: 1.71 m (5 ft 7 1/2 in)
- Position: Midfielder

Senior career*
Years	Team	Apps	(Gls)
2007–2008	Atlético Cihuatlán	9	(0)
2008–2010	Loros UdeC	42	(11)
2010–2011	Monterrey	1	(0)
2012	→ Correcaminos (loan)	2	(1)
2012	→ Querétaro (loan)	1	(0)
2013	→ Altamira (loan)	8	(0)
2013	Deportivo Altos	12	(2)
2014–2015	Lobos BUAP	12	(1)
2016	Loros UdeC	14	(6)
2019	Loros UdeC	12	(1)
2020	Industriales Naucalpan F.C.	0	(0)
2021	Once Deportivo	2	(0)
2021	Real Tlamazolan	0	(0)

International career
2011	Mexico U20	8	(0)
Medal record
Representing Mexico
Winner	CONCACAF U-20 Championship	2011
Third place	FIFA U-20 World Cup	2011
- * Club domestic league appearances and goals

Marvin Leonardo Piñón Polanco (born 12 June 1991) is a Mexican professional footballer who plays as a midfielder.

== Club career ==
Piñón was one of the young promises of Monterrey but only played a few minutes with the senior team. He made his senior team debut on January 8, 2011, as a starter in a match against San Luis in a 2 - 0 loss of Monterrey

== Honours ==
Mexico U20

- CONCACAF U-20 Championship: 2011
- FIFA U-20 World Cup 3rd Place: 2011
