= Víctor Lojero =

Mexican footballer (born 1984)

Personal information
- Full name: Víctor Hugo Lojero
- Date of birth: 17 November 1984 (age 41)
- Place of birth: Mexico City, Mexico
- Height: 1.73 m (5 ft 8 in)
- Position: Forward

Youth career
- 2003–2004: América

Senior career*
Years	Team	Apps	(Gls)
2003–2004	Tigres Broncos	18	(6)
2005	→ San Luis (on loan)	2	(0)
2006–2009	Tampico Madero	83	(38)
2009–2011	San Luis	64	(6)
2011–2015	Necaxa	153	(86)
2016	→ Oaxaca (loan)	16	(3)
2016	→ Tampico Madero (loan)	16	(4)
2017	Zacatecas	15	(0)
2017–2019	Venados	18	(9)
2020–2024	Chapulineros de Oaxaca	0	(0)
- * Club domestic league appearances and goals as of 4 February 2018

Víctor Hugo Lojero (born 17 November 1984) is a former Mexican professional footballer. He last played for Venados as a forward. Lojero made his professional debut with San Luis in 2005.

Lojero played professionally for San Luis and Necaxa.

== Honours ==
=== Club ===
Chapulineros de Oaxaca

- Liga de Balompié Mexicano: 2020–21, 2021

=== Individual ===
- Liga de Balompié Mexicano top scorer: 2021
