= Ricardo Carbajal =

Mexican footballer and manager (born 1968)

Personal information
- Full name: Ricardo Carbajal Oteo
- Date of birth: 17 October 1968 (age 58)
- Place of birth: Mexico City, Mexico
- Height: 1.74 m (5 ft 8 1/2 in)
- Position: Midfielder

Team information
- Current team: Atlante U21 (Manager)

Senior career*
| Years | Team | Apps | (Gls) |
| 1991–1992 | Querétaro | 14 | (3) |
| 1992–1995 | Cruz Azul | 37 | (2) |
| 1995–1998 | Atlante | 79 | (10) |
| 1999–2000 | Monterrey | 49 | (4) |

Managerial career
- 2007: Tecamachalco
- 2008–2010: Potros Chetumal (Assistant)
- 2010: Atlante UTN
- 2011: Tecamachalco
- 2011–2014: Mérida (Assistant)
- 2014–2016: Lobos BUAP (Assistant)
- 2016–2017: Puebla Reserves and Academy
- 2017–2018: Cimarrones de Sonora (Assistant)
- 2018: Cimarrones de Sonora Premier
- 2019–2020: Necaxa Reserves and Academy
- 2020–2021: Industriales Naucalpan
- 2022: Atlético Capitalino
- 2022–2023: Puebla Reserves and Academy
- 2023: Puebla (Interim)
- 2023–2024: Puebla
- 2026: Atlante
- 2026–: Atlante Reserves and Academy
- * Club domestic league appearances and goals

Ricardo Carbajal Oteo (born 17 October 1968) is a Mexican football manager and former player.

He is the assistant manager of Liga de Expansión MX side Atlante.
