= Omar Arellano (footballer, born 1987) =

Mexican footballer

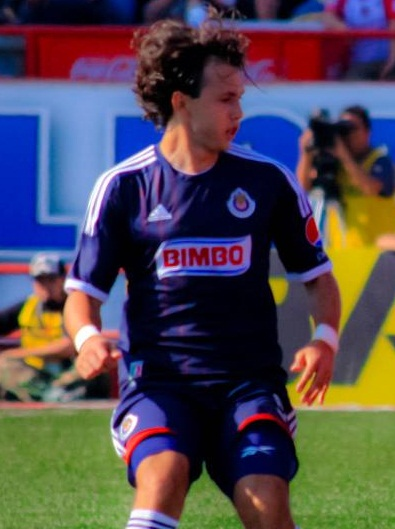
- Arellano playing for Guadalajara in 2011

Personal information
- Full name: Omar Arellano Riverón
- Date of birth: 18 June 1987 (age 39)
- Place of birth: Guadalajara, Jalisco, Mexico
- Height: 1.78 m (5 ft 10 in)
- Position: Midfielder

Youth career
- 1996: Guadalajara
- Pachuca

Senior career*
Years	Team	Apps	(Gls)
2002–2007	Pachuca	19	(3)
2007–2012	Guadalajara	145	(18)
2013–2015	Monterrey	54	(6)
2015–2016	→ Toluca (loan)	18	(3)
2016	UdeG	10	(0)
2016–2017	Tampico Madero	14	(1)
2017	Ontinyent	0	(0)
2017–2019	Herediano	51	(4)
2019–2020	Querétaro	25	(1)
2021–2023	Chapulineros de Oaxaca	0	(0)

International career
2005–2011	Mexico	7	(1)
- * Club domestic league appearances and goals

Omar Arellano Riverón (born 18 June 1987) is a Mexican former professional footballer who played as a midfielder.

== Club career ==
=== Guadalajara ===
Arellano had originally started playing in club Guadalajara's youth ranks around the same time as Javier Hernandez. At the age of 14 he decided to make the move to Club Pachuca where his father Omar Arellano Nuño was offered a job as head coach of Club Pachuca's Juvenil squads. Before returning to Guadalajara in 2007, Arellano had played 394 minutes with Pachuca and had averaged out one goal every 131 minutes. He scored his first goal for CD Guadalajara against their town rivals Atlas, a match that is referred to as "El Clasico Tapatio" (Spanish for "Jalisco's Classic", since they play in the same state and city). On July 12, 2008, while playing the 2008 SuperLiga Arellano scored his second goal with Guadalajara at the 24th minute with a break-away, suiting the number 9 jersey left behind by Omar Bravo and his third goal again in the 2008 Superliga against Houston Dynamo. Arellano scored the two goals that helped Chivas defeat their rivals Club América in the Estadio Azteca in the El Súper Clásico. After a grueling injury that put him in the shelf for months, he returned on February 28, 2009, against F.C. Pachuca where he scored 2 of the 5 goals that his team scored in the 5–0 win. His own father, Omar Arellano Nuño was assistant and for an even shorter amount of time, manager in 2009. On April 4, 2010, he scored against America in the El Súper Clásico and Chivas became the first team in the Torneo Bicentenario to qualify to the liguilla. He is also not had good luck with injury due that he came back from one. On April 27, 2010, in the Copa Libertadores, he made an outstanding participation against Vélez Sársfield where he gave two assist in the 3–0 victory for Chivas de Guadalajara. In a friendly against FC Barcelona he gave an assist to Marco Fabian to give Chivas the lead in their friendly in the World Football Challenge. Arellano is sponsored by Adidas and can be seen wearing the Adidas F50 football cleats.

=== Monterrey ===
Omar Arellano was traded to C.F. Monterrey for the Clausura 2013 tournament for right back Sergio Perez.

=== Deportivo Toluca ===
On June 10, 2015 Toluca agreed to sign Arellano on loan with an option of sign permanently. On July 25, Arellano made his official debut for Toluca defeating Tigres UANL 0–1, in the opening game for the 2015 Apertura Liga MX, celebrated in the Estadio Universitario in Monterrey.

== International career ==
Arellano's first goal with "El Tri" was in a friendly match against Venezuela. He scored last to make the game 4–0. Arellano was called back up after two years of not playing for Mexico. He played against the United States national team in which the game ended in a 1–1 draw.

== International goals ==
No.	Date	Venue	Opponent	Score	Result	Competition	Ref.
1.	24 June 2009	Georgia Dome, Atlanta, United States	Venezuela	4–0	4–0	Friendly	

== Honours ==
Pachuca

- Mexican Primera División: Clausura 2006, Clausura 2007
- CONCACAF Champions' Cup: 2007
- Copa Sudamericana: 2006

Guadalajara

- InterLiga: 2009
- Copa Libertadores runner-up: 2010

Herediano

- Liga FPD: Apertura 2018
- CONCACAF League: 2018

Chapulineros de Oaxaca

- Liga de Balompié Mexicano: 2020–21, 2021
