= Jorge Martínez (football manager) =

Mexican footballer and manager (born 1960)

Jorge Martinez
Personal information
- Full name: Jorge Arturo Martínez Sandoval
- Date of birth: 24 January 1960 (age 66)
- Place of birth: Ciudad Guzmán, Jalisco, Mexico

Managerial career
- Years: Team
- 1998–1999: Tecos UAG
- 2000: Real San Luis
- 2001: Atlético Marte
- 2003: Alacranes de Durango
- 2009: Guerreros
- 2013: Tampico Madero
- 2013–2014: La Piedad
- 2015–2018: Mazorqueros
- 2021: Real Tlamazolan

Jorge Arturo Martínez Sandoval (born 24 January 1960) is a Mexican former football player and coach. He manages Jaibos Tampico Madero.

== Career ==
In 2009, Martínez managed Liga de Ascenso side Guerreros.

He was the coach of atletico marte in 2001.
