= Marco Montelongo =

Mexican footballer (born 1998)

Personal information
- Full name: Marco Antonio Montelongo Rosas
- Date of birth: 31 August 1998 (age 28)
- Place of birth: Centro, Tabasco, Mexico
- Height: 1.73 m (5 ft 8 in)
- Position: Midfielder

Team information
- Current team: Venados
- Number: 22

Youth career
- 2013–2015: Jaguares de la 48
- 2015–2016: UNAM
- 2016: Real Victoria Carmen
- 2017: Deportiva Venados
- 2017: Correcaminos UAT

Senior career*
Years	Team	Apps	(Gls)
2018–2023	UAT	45	(2)
2018	→ Tigres UANL (loan)	0	(0)
2023–2025	Durango	57	(6)
2025–2026	Real Apodaca	24	(4)
2026–	Venados	7	(0)
- * Club domestic league appearances and goals as of 9 September 2026

Marco Antonio Montelongo Rosas (born 31 August 1998) is a Mexican footballer who plays as a midfielder for Liga de Expansión MX club Venados.
