= Christian Patiño =

Mexican footballer (born 1975)

Personal information
- Full name: Christian Patiño Gómez
- Date of birth: 16 August 1975 (age 51)
- Place of birth: Los Mochis, Sinaloa, Mexico
- Height: 1.68 m (5 ft 6 in)
- Position: Goalkeeper

Senior career*
Years	Team	Apps	(Gls)
1995–2003	América	128	(16)
1998–1999	→ Unión de Curtidores (loan)	42	(0)
1999–2000	→ León (loan)	18	(0)
2000–2001	→ La Piedad (loan)	45	(0)
2004	San Luis	19	(2)
2004–2006	Sinaloa	46	(7)
2006	→ Gallos de Caliente (loan)	2	(0)
2007	Querétaro	10	(1)
2007	→ Celaya (loan)	9	(2)

International career
2003	Mexico	2	(1)

Managerial career
- 2024: Agricultores de Guasave
- * Club domestic league appearances and goals

Christian Patiño Gómez (born August 16, 1975, in Los Mochis, Sinaloa) is a Mexican former footballer and current manager.

During his career as a footballer he played as a goalkeeper, starting his career in 1995 with the Mexican team América. Between 1998 and 2001, he was loaned to the clubs Unión de Curtidores, León and La Piedad.

In 2001, he became the starting goalkeeper for América, scoring a goal in the final match of the Verano 2022 Tournament where his team defeated Necaxa. In March 2003, Patiño played two matches with the Mexico national football team, being part of the Mexican national team in the games against Bolivia and Paraguay, scoring a goal in the second match.

In 2004, he left América when he was transferred to San Luis, where he only stayed for six months. Between 2004 and 2007 he played for Dorados de Sinaloa.

Finally, in 2007 he went on to play with Querétaro, where he also played a few games for Celaya which functioned as the reserve team of the Querétaro club. At the end of 2007, he retired from professional football. After retiring, he established a project to support hispanic migrants in Philadelphia, focusing on football as a development tool for that community.

On October 28, 2024, Patiño was appointed manager of the Mexican team Agricultores de Guasave, which plays in the Liga Premier – Serie A, being his first position as coach of a professional soccer team.

== Career statistics ==
National team	Year	Apps	Goals
Mexico	2003	2	1
Mexico	Total	2	1

Goal	Date	Venue	Opponent	Score	Result	Competition
1.	26 March 2003	Qualcomm Stadium, San Diego, United States	Paraguay	1–1	1–1	Friendly match

== Honours ==
América

- Mexican Primera División: Verano 2002
- CONCACAF Giants Cup: 2001

Unión de Curtidores

- Primera División "A": Verano 1999
- Primera División "A": Final de Ascenso 1998–99
