= Juan Carlos Martínez (footballer) =

Mexican footballer (born 1991)

Personal information
- Full name: Juan Carlos Martínez Camarena
- Date of birth: 18 January 1991 (age 35)
- Place of birth: Arandas, Jalisco, Mexico
- Height: 1.77 m (5 ft 10 in)
- Position: Forward

Youth career
- 2007–2008: Tepatitlán
- 2008–2009: Arandas
- 2009–2013: Guadalajara

Senior career*
Years	Team	Apps	(Gls)
2013–2017	U. de C.	99	(65)
2014	→ Coras (loan)	6	(0)
2018–2019	Coras	28	(19)
2019	UAEM	9	(2)
2020	Deportivo Marquense		
2020–2022	Furia Roja		
- * Club domestic league appearances and goals

Juan Carlos Martínez Camarena (Note: In this Spanish name, the first or paternal surname is Martínez and the second or maternal family name is Camarena.) (born January 18, 1991) is a Mexican professional footballer who currently plays for Furia Roja. He made his professional debut with Guadalajara during a Primera División draw against Querétaro on 17 March 2012.
