= Chivas Tijuana =

Mexican football club

- Full name: Chivas Tijuana
- Nickname: Chivas
- Founded: 1997; 29 years ago
- Dissolved: 1999; 27 years ago
- Ground: Estadio del Cerro Colorado; Tijuana, Baja California
- League: Defunct
Home colours	Away colours

Chivas Tijuana, was a Mexican professional football club and former affiliate of Guadalajara. It was based in Tijuana, Baja California.

== History ==
The club was founded in 1997 in Tijuana, Baja California, and was affiliated with Guadalajara from the Primera División de México. The city of Tijuana wanted to have a professional soccer club after many failed attempts with clubs Inter and Tijuana Stars.

The club was acquired after the 1997 tournament when the Federación Mexicana de Fútbol (FMF) put four franchises for sale, one bought by Tijuana the others by Unión de Curtidores, América, Halcones de Querétaro, Tecos de la UAG, and Jaguares de Colima. The club counted on 18 players from San Luis Río Colorado, Mexicali, Rosarito, San Diego and a few more who contributed young talent but was relegated to the Segunda División de México.

In 1999, the club played its last year as Chivas Tijuana, after the Federación Mexicana de Fútbol decided that there could not be two clubs with the name Chivas. After the 1999 tournament, the club changed its name to Nacional Tijuana.
