= José Ramírez (footballer, born 1982) =

Mexican footballer (born 1982)

Personal information
- Full name: José María Ramírez López
- Date of birth: 27 July 1982 (age 44)
- Place of birth: Mexico City, Mexico
- Height: 1.71 m (5 ft 7 in)
- Position: Midfielder

Team information
- Current team: Chapulineros de Oaxaca (president)

Senior career*
Years	Team	Apps	(Gls)
2004–2006	Cruz Azul Oaxaca	67	(9)
2006–2007	Cruz Azul Hidalgo	48	(5)
2006–2007	Cruz Azul	2	(0)
2009	Tecos UAG A	11	(0)
2010–2011	La Piedad	35	(3)
2015	Veracruz	0	(0)
2015	→ Oaxaca (loan)	2	(0)
Total		165	(17)
- * Club domestic league appearances and goals

José María Ramírez López (Note: In this Spanish name, the first or paternal surname is Ramírez and the second or maternal family name is López.) (born 27 July 1982) is a Mexican former professional footballer who played as a midfielder. As of 2023, he is the president of Chapulineros de Oaxaca.
