= Ángel Lemus =

Mexican footballer (born 1971)

Personal information
- Full name: Ángel Lemus Silva
- Date of birth: 3 September 1971 (age 55)
- Place of birth: Iztacalco, Mexico City, Mexico
- Height: 1.77 m (5 ft 10 in)
- Position: Forward

Youth career
- 1988–1990: Necaxa

Senior career*
Years	Team	Apps	(Gls)
1990–1993	Necaxa	9	(2)
1993–1994	Querétaro	16	(4)
1994–1997	Irapuato	89	(43)
1997–2001	San Luis	128	(65)
2001–2002	Zacatepec	7	(1)
2003	Chapulineros de Oaxaca	18	(4)
2003	Altamira	5	(1)
Total		272	(120)

International career
1992	Mexico U23	1	(1)
- * Club domestic league appearances and goals as of 19-07-10

Ángel Lemus Silva (born 3 September 1971) is a Mexican former footballer who played as a forward. He was a member of the Mexico national team competing at the 1992 Summer Olympics in Barcelona, Spain.

== Career ==
Lemus played club football for Club Necaxa and Querétaro F.C.
