= Alfonso Nieto =

Mexican footballer (born 1991)

Personal information
- Full name: José Alfonso Nieto Martínez
- Date of birth: 30 October 1991 (age 35)
- Place of birth: Mexico City, Mexico
- Height: 1.77 m (5 ft 10 in)
- Position: Forward

Youth career
- 2008–2010: UNAM

Senior career*
Years	Team	Apps	(Gls)
2010–2016	UNAM	38	(1)
2017	→ Herediano (loan)	15	(3)
2018	Carabobo FC	13	(0)
2020	Toros Neza		
2021	Deportivo Coatepeque		
2022	Halcones de Querétaro		
2023	Toros Neza		

Managerial career
- 2019–2020: Inter Playa del Carmen (assistant)
- * Club domestic league appearances and goals as of 20 January 2021

José Alfonso Nieto Martínez (born 30 October 1991) is a former Mexican footballer, who last played as a forward for Deportivo Coatepeque.
