= Jaguares de Jalisco =

Mexican association football club

- Full name: Club Deportivo Jaguares de Jalisco
- Founded: 27 March 2020; 6 years ago
- Dissolved: November 2020; 5 years ago
- Ground: Complejo Deportivo Jaguares; Zapopan, Jalisco
- Capacity: 3,000
- Owner(s): Carlos Samperio; Pablo Rodríguez; Roberto Báez
- Chairman: Roberto Báez
- League: Liga de Balompié Mexicano
Home colours	Away colours

Club Deportivo Jaguares de Jalisco was a Mexican professional football team based in Zapopan, Jalisco that competed in the Liga de Balompié Mexicano.

== History ==
In February 2020, the first assembly of teams interested in forming a new professional football competition in Mexico, called Liga de Balompié Mexicano, was held. In this event, the interest of a team called Jaguares de Jalisco was made known. On March 27, the club's participation was confirmed, being the third franchise to be registered in the new league. On April 30, the team appointed Juan Pablo García as manager.

On June 13, 2020, the Estadio Tres de Marzo was announced as the venue for the team's matches, which would be shared with Tecos F.C. and Halcones de Zapopan.

On July 4, 2020, the team played its first game against Ameca F.C. The game ended with a 3-1 victory in favor of Jaguares.

== Stadium ==
The first stadium was the Estadio 3 de Marzo, situated in Zapopan, a district that forms part of the Guadalajara Metropolitan Area, and is the ground of Tecos, which plays in the Segunda División de México. The stadium has a capacity of 18,779 people and was constructed on the campus of the Universidad Autónoma de Guadalajara.

In November 2020, the team was moved to Centro Deportivo y Cultural 24 de Marzo located in Tala, Jalisco, this with the aim of demonstrating its interest in representing the entire State of Jalisco and not only the Guadalajara Metropolitan Area. This venue has a capacity to host 2,000 spectators and was opened in 2015.

== Players ==
=== First-team squad ===
As of 1 September 2021

Note: Flags indicate national team as defined under FIFA eligibility rules; some limited exceptions apply. Players may hold more than one non-FIFA nationality.

No.	Pos.	Nation	Player
