= Furia Roja F.C. =

Mexican association football club

- Full name: Furia Roja Fútbol Club
- Nickname: La Furia
- Founded: 2007; 19 years ago (as Club Rojos de Jesús María)
- Ground: Estadio Ramírez Nogales; Jesús María, Jalisco
- Capacity: 600
- Owner: Caja Popular Oblatos
- Chairman: José Bruno Arce Contreras
- League: Tercera División de México
- Website: http://furiarojafc.com/
Home colours	Away colours

Furia Roja Fútbol Club is a Mexican professional football club based in Jesús María, Jalisco, which currently competes in the Tercera División de México, the bottom division level of Mexican football.

== History ==
The team was originally founded in 2007 under the name Club Rojos de Jesús María, playing in the Tercera División de México. The club with this name until 2010. Subsequently, football was maintained in the town with amateur-type teams.

In June 2020, the Liga de Balompié Mexicano updated its list of teams in the process of affiliation for its first season, a team based in the town appeared on the list, but without knowing the name. Finally, on June 23, the presence of the new club, called Furia Roja, was confirmed, the team was the 11th confirmed franchise in the new league. Grupo Radiorama, a media company, took over the team so that it could participate in the competition.

On July 10, the club's technical staff was announced, headed by Andrés Edmundo González as manager and Eustacio Rizo as his assistant. Isaac Díaz and Edgar Morales were the first two players announced by the club.

After two years in the LBM, in 2022 the team requested a one-year hiatus to restructure. In 2023, Furia Roja announced its change of league, going on to play in the Tercera División de México, the bottom division level of the league system endorsed by the Federación Mexicana de Fútbol (FMF). In August 2023, the return of the Furia Roja to the competitions organized by the Federación Mexicana de Fútbol was confirmed, however, the team associated with Caja Oblatos, a club from Guadalajara, Jalisco, for which it was renamed Caja Oblatos - Furia Roja.

== Stadium ==
The Estadio Ramírez Nogales is situated in Jesús María, Jalisco, and is the ground of Furia Roja F.C. which plays in the Tercera División de México. It has the capacity to hold 600 spectators.

== Players ==
=== First-team squad ===
As of 13 October 2021
