= Chapulineros de Oaxaca =

Mexican football club

- Full name: Club de Fútbol Chapulineros de Oaxaca
- Nickname: Chapulineros
- Founded: 1983; 43 years ago
- Ground: Estadio Independiente MRCI
- Capacity: 6,000
- Owner: MRCI
- Chairman: José María Ramírez
- Manager: Carlos Ayala
- League: Liga Premier (Primera Premier)
- 2025–26: Regular phase: 10th of 13 (Group III); Final phase: Not qualified
Home colours	Away colours	Third colours

Club de Fútbol Chapulineros de Oaxaca is a professional football club based in San Jerónimo Tlacochahuaya, Oaxaca. The club competes in Liga Premier (Primera Premier), the third level of Mexican football, and plays its home matches at Estadio Independiente MRCI. Founded in 1983, after the Benito Juárez Autonomous University of Oaxaca (UABJO) acquired the franchise of Pumas ENEP in the Segunda División. From 2020 to 2025, Chapulineros participated in the Liga de Balompié Mexicano. (Note: Semi-professional league in Mexico not recognized by FMF and FIFA. The league was affiliated with CONIFA.)

== History ==
The club's origins date back to 1983, when the UABJO bought the franchise of Pumas ENEP, the Pumas UNAM reserve team and it was renamed as Chapulineros de Oaxaca, compiting in the 1985–86 Mexican Segunda División season.

In 1994, the club remains in the Segunda División after the creation of the Primera División 'A' as the new second level of Mexican football, later it became a team affiliated with Toros Neza, to later be managed by the Universidad Regional del Sureste.

For the 2001–02 Primera División A season, the Grupo Pegaso returns to the Chapulineros to professional football after acquiring the franchise of Lobos UAP and relocating it to Oaxaca. The club had bad results and had to play a relegation play-out to remain in the league, which they managed to win and could continue to play in the same division. For the 2003–04 season the club was dissolved again when the franchise was moved to Tlaxcala, and later renamed as Guerreros de Tlaxcala.

On August 2015, the MRCI corporate obtained the franchise of Teca Huixquilucan from Huixquilucan, State of Mexico, becoming the new franchise of Chapulineros de Oaxaca and began to participate in the Liga Premier de Ascenso for the 2015–16 season. For the 2017–18 season, the club competed in the Serie B due to the lack of infrastructure to be able to participate for the promotion to Ascenso MX. In 2018, the club paused its sporting activity because it did not get the endorsement to participate in the league from the FMF. In 2019, the club returned to compete in FMF competitions, and leaving the following year to join the Liga de Balompié Mexicano.

Chapulineros was crowned as the first champions of the LBM, finished in third place in the regular season with 22 points from seven wins, two draws and one loss. In the final phase, Chapulineros eliminated Morelos F.C. and Furia Roja F.C. to reach the final, and defeating Atlético Veracruz in the final by penalty shoot-out.

Chapulineros de Oaxaca won the LBM titles in 2021, 2022 and 2023, making it the most successful club in that league. On January 2025, the LBM was dissolved due to a lack of participating club, making the competition's continuation unviable, so Chapulineros had to look for a new league to compete.

On June 2025, the club rejoined to the FMF's football league system and participate in the Liga Premier.

== Seasons ==
Period	League
1983–1994	Segunda División
2001–2003	Primera División 'A'
2015–2018	Segunda División/Liga Premier
2018–19	Liga TDP
2019–20	Liga Premier
2020–2025	Liga de Balompié Mexicano
2025–present	Liga Premier

== Past badges and kits ==
badge worn during stay in the Primera A

2nd Past Badge

First kit evolution

2001

== Players ==
=== Current squad ===
As of August 28, 2026

Note: Flags indicate national team as defined under FIFA eligibility rules; some limited exceptions apply. Players may hold more than one non-FIFA nationality.

No.	Pos.	Nation	Player
1	GK	MEX	Jaime Patiño
2	DF	MEX	César Delgado
3	DF	MEX	Luis Iturbide
4	DF	MEX	Ángel Martínez
5	DF	MEX	Christian Laredo
6	MF	MEX	Juan José Medina
7	MF	MEX	Armando Amaya
8	MF	ARG	Alan Gigena
9	FW	MEX	Enrique Ávalos
10	MF	MEX	John García
11	FW	PAR	Bernardo Cabrera
12	GK	MEX	Oswaldo Nava
13	DF	MEX	Karol Ayuzo
14	MF	MEX	Daniel Mederos
15	DF	MEX	Emilio Moreno
16	DF	MEX	Jonatan Vargas

No.	Pos.	Nation	Player
17	MF	MEX	Leonardo Sánchez
18	FW	MEX	Cristóbal Méndez
19	MF	MEX	Isaí Gil
20	MF	USA	Keven Rosario
21	MF	MEX	Luis Alavez
22	FW	MEX	Juan Diego Sierra
23	DF	MEX	Carlos García
24	MF	MEX	Diego Fragoso
25	MF	MEX	Gael Velásquez
26	MF	MEX	Fernando Vázquez
27	FW	MEX	Ángel Reséndiz
28	DF	MEX	Amaury Sosa
29	DF	MEX	Kevin Pérez
30	GK	MEX	Emilio Carmona

=== Recent outstanding players ===
- (Mexico) Alan Cruz
- (Mexico) Jorge Bernal
- (Argentina) Cristian Mazzón
- (Mexico) Marco Antonio Sánchez
- (Argentina) Miguel Ángel Vargas
- (Mexico) Ángel Lemus
- (Mexico) Hugo Omar Sánchez
- (Mexico) José Luis Mendoza
- (Mexico) Ricardo Munguía
- (Argentina) Silvio Rudman

== Reserves ==
=== Chapulineros de Oaxaca TDP ===
Reserve team that competes in the Liga TDP, the fourth level of Mexican football.

== Honours ==
=== Domestic ===
==== Semi-professional ====
- Liga de Balompié Mexicano
  - Champions (5): 2020–21, 2021, 2022, 2023-A, 2023-B
- Copa Balompié Mexicano
  - Champions (1): Invierno 2022
- Campeón de Campeones de la Liga de Balompié Mexicano
  - Champions (1): 2022
