= Atlético Capitalino =

Mexican association football club

- Full name: Atlético Capitalino Fútbol Club
- Nicknames: Capitalinos, Fuerza Chilanga
- Founded: 3 July 2020; 5 years ago
- Dissolved: 16 May 2022; 4 years ago
- Ground: Estadio Municipal Claudio Suárez; Texcoco, State of Mexico
- Capacity: 4,000
- Chairman: Philippe Caire Toffano
- League: Liga de Balompié Mexicano
- 2020–21: Withdrew
Home colours	Away colours

Atlético Capitalino Fútbol Club was a Mexican professional football club based in Texcoco, State of Mexico that competed in the Liga de Balompié Mexicano.

== History ==
In June 2020, the Liga de Balompié Mexicano announced the existence of a project called Atlético Capitalino which would seek to lead a team representing Mexico City in this new competition. On June 29, the hiring of Eduardo Bacas as manager was announced. On July 3, the official foundation of the club was announced, in addition to being accepted as a franchise member of the Liga de Balompié Mexicano.

On May 16, 2022, Atlético Capitalino was expelled from the LBM for not complying with the rules of the competition.

== Stadium ==
The Estadio Municipal de Atitalaquía is a multi-use stadium in Atitalaquía, Hidalgo. It is currently used mostly for football matches. The stadium has a capacity of 1,500 people and hosts Liga de Balompié Mexicano and amateur soccer matches.

Previously, the club played its home matches in stadiums Jesús Martínez "Palillo" and Valentín González, both located in Mexico City.

Later, the club played its home matches in the Estadio Municipal Claudio Suárez, located in Texcoco, State of Mexico.

== Players ==
=== First-team squad ===
As of 1 April 2022

Note: Flags indicate national team as defined under FIFA eligibility rules; some limited exceptions apply. Players may hold more than one non-FIFA nationality.

No. / Pos. / Nation / Player	No. / Pos. / Nation / Player
