= Real Tlamazolan =

Mexican association football club

- Full name: Deportivo Real Tlamazolan
- Nickname: Tlamazolan
- Founded: 13 June 2021; 5 years ago
- Dissolved: 8 September 2021; 4 years ago
- Ground: Estadio Olímpico de Ciudad Guzmán; Ciudad Guzmán, Jalisco
- Capacity: 3,700
- Owner: Grupo Empresarial Occidente
- Chairman: Pedro García
- League: Liga de Balompié Mexicano
Home colours	Away colours

Deportivo Real Tlamazolan was a Mexican professional football club based in Ciudad Guzmán, Jalisco, that competed in the Liga de Balompié Mexicano.

== History ==
The team was founded on June 13, 2021 to take part in the Liga de Balompié Mexicano starting in August.

On August 22, 2021, the team played its first official match, defeating Toros Neza by a score of 1–4. Santiago Giraldo scored the first goal in the club's history.

== Stadium ==
Deportivo Real Tlamazolan played its home games at the Estadio Olímpico de Ciudad Guzmán in Ciudad Guzmán, Jalisco, which has an approximate capacity for 3,000 spectators.

== Players ==
=== First-team squad ===
As of 8 September 2021

Note: Flags indicate national team as defined under FIFA eligibility rules; some limited exceptions apply. Players may hold more than one non-FIFA nationality.

No. / Pos. / Nation / Player	No. / Pos. / Nation / Player
