= Venados F.C. =

Mexican football club based in Mérida

Venados
- Full name: Venados Fútbol Club Yucatán
- Nicknames: Venados (Bucks); Astados (Horned); Ciervos (Deer)
- Short name: VEN
- Founded: 2 September 1988; 38 years ago (as Venados de Yucatán)
- Ground: Estadio Carlos Iturralde
- Capacity: 15,087
- Owner: Grupo R4
- Chairman: Rodolfo Rosas Cantillo
- Manager: Nacho Castro
- League: Liga de Expansión MX
- Apertura 2026: Regular phase: 6th of 16; Final phase: Quarter-finals
- Website: www.venadosfc.com.mx
Home colours	Away colours

Venados Fútbol Club Yucatán, simply known as Venados, is a professional football club based in Mérida, Yucatán. The club competes in Liga de Expansión MX, the second level of Mexican football, and plays its home matches at Estadio Carlos Iturralde. Founded in 1988 as Venados de Yucatán, the club was renamed as Club Deportivo Atlético Yucatán (1997–2001, 2002–2003), Mérida Fútbol Club (2003–2011), Club de Fútbol Mérida (2011–2015), and finally adopted its current name in 2015.

== History ==
=== Origins and first franchise ===
The club originally emerged in 1988 as Venados de Yucatán, when Jorge Arana Palma, acquired the Alacranes Rojos de Apatzingán franchise from the Segunda División de México and relocated it to Mérida, Yucatán, and it was during this stage when the colors that would identify them to this day are defined, green, yellow and white. During this first season, they were runners-up in the Segunda División de México in the 1988-89 season.

First badge of the club (1988–1997)

=== Club Deportivo Atlético Yucatán ===
The club was renamed as Club Deportivo Atlético Yucatán in 1997, it played in the Primera División 'A' de México. The franchise was dissolved in 2001, but it returned the following year. The club won the title in the Invierno 1998 tournament, defeating Chivas Tijuana 1–0 in Mérida, and also played the Campeón de Ascenso 1999 against Unión de Curtidores, but lost 7–1.

Atlético Yucatán (1997–2003)

=== Mérida Fútbol Club/Club de Fútbol Mérida ===
Atlético Yucatán was renamed as Mérida Fútbol Club in 2003 by the brothers Arturo and Mauricio Millet Reyes, who obtained the Nacional Tijuana franchise and relocated to Mérida, Yucatán.

==== Loss of franchise in 2005 and continuation at lower levels ====
After the Clausura 2005 tournament, the Millet brothers announced that they would be selling and relocating the team to Irapuato, Guanajuato renaming it Club Irapuato due to financial and economic problems, citing lackluster attendance and poor support from the local government. Nevertheless, the brothers formed a team that participated in an amateur league in Yucatán and also opened a training facility in Argentina to scout local talent. Mérida F.C. returned to the professional ranks when they participated in the Tercera División de México in 2006/07. During 2007, the brothers oversaw the construction of a training facility located at the Unidad Deportiva Tamanché. By the 2007/08 season, Mérida was participating in the Segunda División de México.

==== Return of second level franchise with Morelia ====
On June 16, 2008, Arturo Millet Reyes announced that he had acquired the filial team of Monarcas Morelia. Millet Reyes has stated that his intention is to maintain the team in Mérida for an extended period of time, unlike in previous years. He also received a guarantee that if the Venados were to be promoted to the Primera División de México, that the team would remain in Mérida.

On November 11, 2008, the Federación Mexicana de Fútbol (FMF) granted the club the certification required to be promoted to the Primera División de México.

In the Clausura 2009, Mérida defeated Tijuana 1–0 on aggregate to win the Clausura title. Mérida lost the subsequent promotion play-off for the Primera División de México, after a defeat by Querétaro on penalties.

==== Sale of franchise to Atlante ====
On December 4, 2010, the brothers Arturo and Mauricio Millet Reyes announced that Mérida F.C. would no longer form part of the Liga de Ascenso de México and that Monarcas Morelia would decide if a team would stay in the city, but that talks were also underway with Atlante regarding the creation of a link with them.

The Mérida franchise was subsequently sold to Atlante and they became that team's filial team for the Clausura 2011, whilst the original Atlante filial team (Atlante UTN) swapped franchises to become the subsidiary team for Morelia. The franchise would later be transferred to Ciudad Nezahualcóyotl, State of Mexico and renamed Toros Neza.

=== Venados Fútbol Club Yucatán ===
The Federación Mexicana de Fútbol Asociación announced that the Apertura 2015 tournament would be 16 teams who would play the Ascenso MX instead of 14, as it was in recent tournaments. In addition, two clubs would be changing cities and states to the next season.

Estudiantes de Altamira became Cafetaleros de Tapachula, who were headquartered at the Estadio Olímpico in Tapachula, Chiapas; while Club Irapuato became Murciélagos F.C. and changed their headquarters to the Estadio Centenario located in Los Mochis, Sinaloa.

In addition to these changes, two new franchises were added later, that of Cimarrones de Sonora, headquartered at the Estadio Heroes de Nacozari in Hermosillo, Sonora, and the FC Juárez franchise began playing in the Estadio Olímpico Benito Juárez in Ciudad Juárez, Chihuahua.

Finally, it was announced that Mérida Fútbol Club would now be changing logo and be renamed Venados F.C. (keeping the venue in Mérida).

This meant that the Venados F.C. team would be the "rebirth" of Venados de Yucatán franchise in 2015.

== Personnel ==
=== Management ===
Position	Staff
Chairman	(Mexico) Rodolfo Rosas Cantillo
Vice-chairman	(Mexico) Alberto Alcocer
Director of football	(Argentina) Bruno Marioni

Source: Liga MX

=== Coaching staff ===
Position	Staff
Manager	(Spain) Nacho Castro
Assistant manager	(Mexico) Guillermo Gómez
Goalkeeper coach	(Mexico) Juan de Dios Ibarra
Fitness coach	(Mexico) Víctor Belmont
Physiotherapist	(Mexico) José Narváez
Team doctor	(Mexico) Santiago Dorantes

=== Providers and sponsors ===
Current kit provider: Joma.

Current sponsors: Corona Extra, Caliente.mx, Yucatán Travel, Mérida, contigo es mejor, Boston's Pizza, Burger King, Ciudad Maderas, Nus-Káh, Electrolit, Powerade, Lapa Lapa Restaurant & Bar, Hacienda Teya, Puerto Lindo, Totalplay, Texas Roadhouse, SIMCA, Aeroméxico, Súper Aki, Grupo R4, Medio Tiempo, Coca-Cola, Sportsworld, Jack Link's, E-Stom and ADO.

== Players ==
=== First-team squad ===
As of 15 September 2026

Note: Flags indicate national team as defined under FIFA eligibility rules; some limited exceptions apply. Players may hold more than one non-FIFA nationality.

No.	Pos.	Nation	Player
1	GK	MEX	Cristian González
2	DF	URU	Maximiliano Pinela (on loan from Racing de Montevideo)
3	GK	MEX	Santiago Pérez
4	DF	MEX	Axel Grijalva
5	MF	MEX	Santiago Naveda (on loan from América)
6	MF	MEX	Érick Torres
7	MF	USA	Jacobo Reyes
8	FW	NGR	Paul Kilani
9	FW	ARG	Lucas Lazarte
10	MF	MEX	Adolfo Domínguez
11	MF	MEX	Duilio Tejeda
12	GK	MEX	Ángel Arredondo
13	DF	MEX	Brandón Ochoa
14	DF	MEX	Santiago Montiel
16	MF	MEX	Luis Macías

No.	Pos.	Nation	Player
17	FW	COL	Luis Arroyo
18	MF	MEX	Khaled Amador
20	DF	MEX	Juan Cruz
21	DF	MEX	Jesús Moreno
22	DF	MEX	Marco Montelongo
23	GK	MEX	Rubén Castellanos
27	MF	MEX	Santiago Benítez
29	FW	COL	Sleyther Lora
30	MF	MEX	Máximo Torres
31	DF	MEX	Idekel Domínguez
32	DF	MEX	Mauricio Aguilar
33	FW	MEX	Jardel Cejudo
34	DF	MEX	Sebastián Saucedo
35	MF	MEX	Asael Hernández

== Managers ==
- (Mexico) David Patiño (2008–2010)
- (Mexico) Mario García (2011)
- (Argentina) Ricardo Valiño (2011–2014)
- (Mexico) Juan Carlos Chávez (2014–2015)
- (Uruguay) Daniel Rossello (Interim) (2015)
- (Mexico) Marcelo Michel Leaño (2016)
- (Mexico) José Luis Sánchez Solá (2016–2017)
- (Argentina) Bruno Marioni (2017–2018)
- (Mexico) Joel Sánchez (2018)
- (Mexico) Sergio Orduña (2018–2019)
- (Mexico) Carlos Gutiérrez (2020–2022)
- (Argentina) Andrés Carevic (2022)
- (Argentina) Bruno Marioni (2022–2023)
- (Mexico) Rafael Fernández (2023–2024)
- (Mexico) Rigoberto Esparza (2024–2025)
- (Spain) Nacho Castro (2025–)

== Honours ==
Domestic
Type	Competition	Titles	Seasons	Runners-up
Lower levels FMF	Primera División A	2	Inv–1998, Cla–2009	—
Lower levels FMF	Campeón de Ascenso	0	—	1999, 2009
Lower levels FMF	Segunda División	0	—	1988–89

== Reserves ==
=== Itzaes ===
The team competes in the Liga TDP, the fourth level of Mexican football.

=== Mérida B ===
The team participated in the Liga Premier, finishing as champions in the Apertura 2008, defeating Loros UdeC 3–2 on penalties. It also won the Campeón de Campeones de la Segunda División 2009, defeating Universidad del Fútbol 3–2 on aggregate. In 2014, the franchise was acquired by Deportiva Venados and moved to Tamanché.

=== Venados B ===
The team participated in the Liga TDP, it was not eligible for promotion.
