= Jesús María, Jalisco =

Jesús María
- Municipality and Town
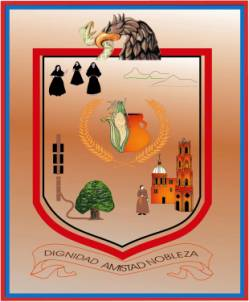
- Coat of arms

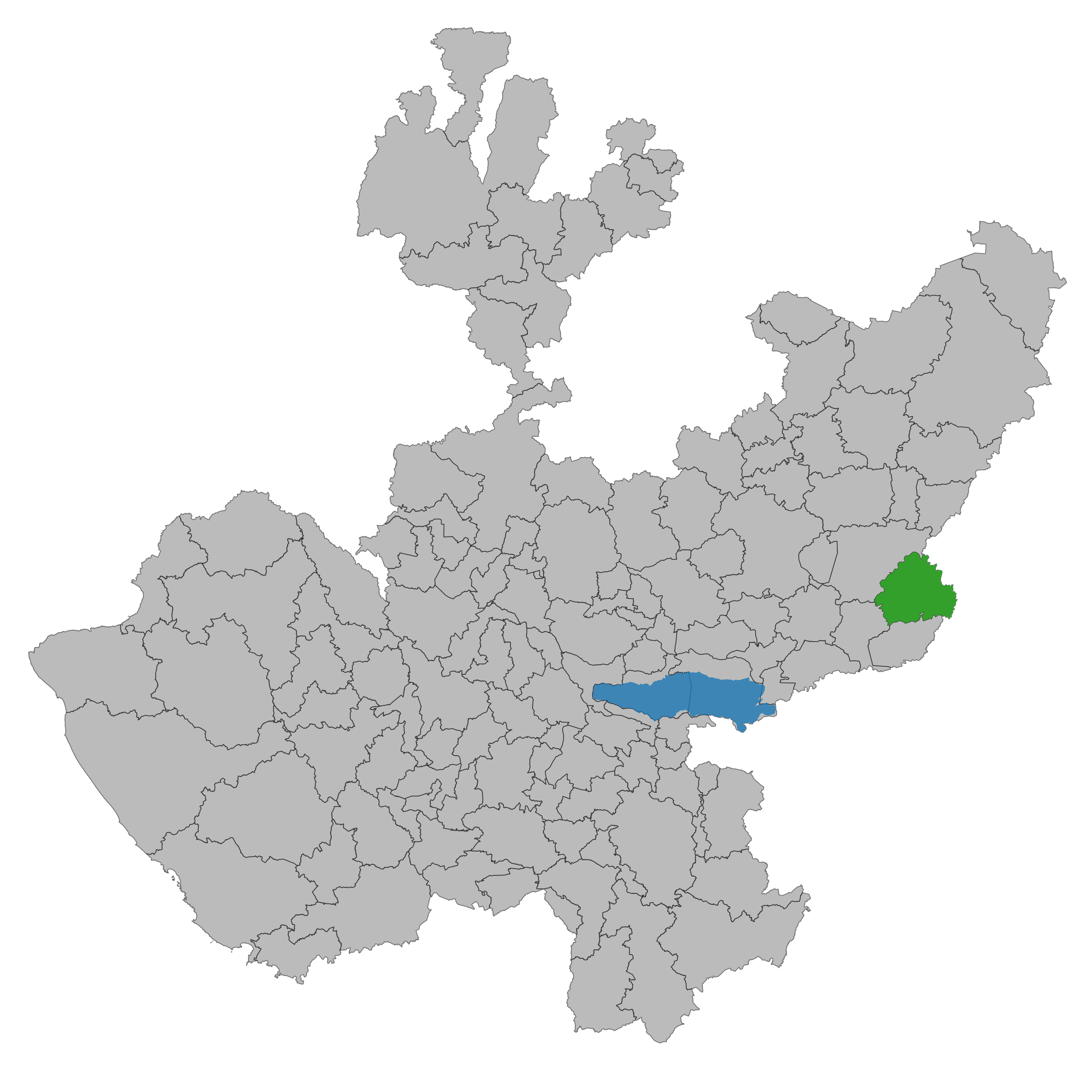
- Location of the municipality in Jalisco

- Location in Jalisco Location in Mexico
- Coordinates: 20°36′28.05″N 102°13′27.17″W
- Country: Mexico
- State: Jalisco

Area
  - Total: 665.2 km^{2} (256.8 sq mi)
  - Town: 2.61 km^{2} (1.01 sq mi)

Population (2020 census)
  - Total: 18,982
  - Density: 28.54/km^{2} (73.91/sq mi)
  - Town: 9,436
  - Town density: 3,620/km^{2} (9,360/sq mi)
- Time zone: UTC-6 (Central Standard Time)

Jesús María is a town and municipality in the region of Los Altos of the Mexican state of Jalisco, located approximately 2 hours drive east of the state capital Guadalajara. The population of the municipality is 18,982 as of 2020.

== History ==
The official name of Jesús María Municipality has its origin in the colonial age that is why in its respective name there is no reference to any pre-Hispanic word.

The city was founded in 1530 by Spaniard Nuño de Guzmán who worked under Hernán Cortés. The town used to be part of the Spanish Empire (New Spain) before the Revolution, part of Nueva Galicia. In 1776 it was named Barranca de Viudas, after three Spanish women who founded the town. The region before that was populated by different tribes, the Toltecs (623 to 626), the Chichimecas (800–1150), the Huicholes and finally the Aztecs in 1164 till the Spanish Conquest.

== Demographics ==
The indigenous population of Jesús María, as of 2005, stands at .03%. Most of its population is, in colonial terms, Criollo (Mexican born Whites) or Mestizo (Amerindian and European Spanish).

== Economy ==
Most of its economy depends on agriculture. 90% of it is corn, the rest are beans, wheat, pumpkin, sábila and agave for tequila production. Stockbreeding is used for exports to Guadalajara and 51% is used for internal consumption and sale. Its industries include factories for candy, tequila, shoes, and clothing. Touristic places of interest include the Templo Parroquial, a popular landmark constructed between 1835 and 1840. It is 30 meters high and has an unusual squared look to it. During the months of December and January for the "Las Fiestas Patronales" thousands of people from all over Mexico and the United States return to celebrate in honor of "La Sagrada Familia".
