= Estadio Independiente MRCI =

Football stadium in San Jerónimo Tlacochahuaya, Mexico

- Estadio del Cerro de Tlacochahuaya
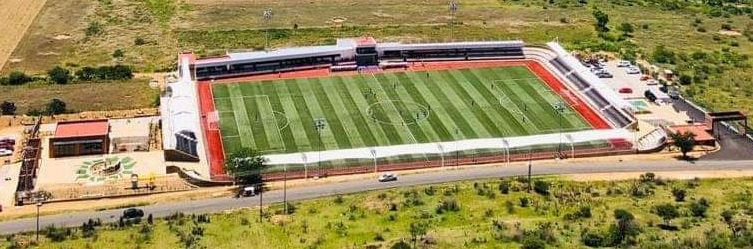
- Interactive map of Estadio Independiente MRCI
- Full name: Estadio Deportivo Independiente MRCI
- Location: San Jerónimo Tlacochahuaya, Oaxaca, Mexico
- Coordinates: 17°00′38″N 96°34′22″W
- Owner: Club Deportivo MRCI
- Capacity: 6,000
- Surface: Natural grass

Construction
- Opened: April 28, 2018

Tenants
- Chapulineros de Oaxaca (2019–present); Mezcaleros de Oaxaca (2022–2024)

Estadio Independiente MRCI is a football stadium in San Jerónimo Tlacochahuaya, Oaxaca, Mexico. It is currently used mostly for football matches and is the home stadium of Chapulineros de Oaxaca. The stadium seats 6,000 people.

The stadium has a field of artificial grass, an area of stands, boxes, artificial lighting, dressing rooms, parking, cafeteria and a small sports complex annex, in addition to housing the clubhouse of Chapulineros de Oaxaca.

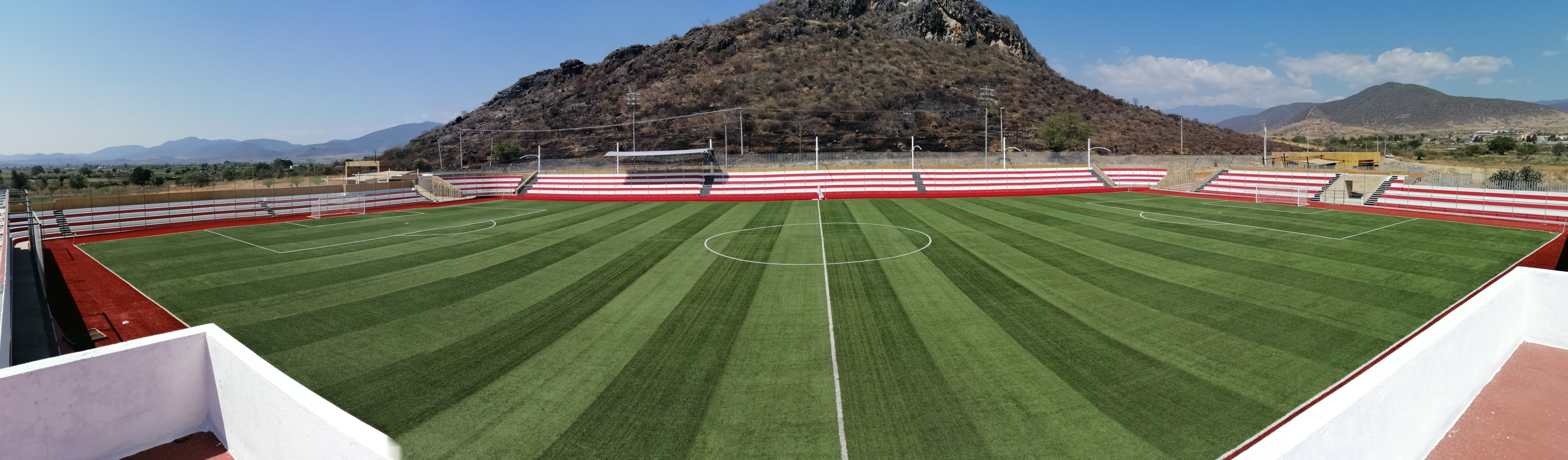
Stadium panoramic view

Since 2019 it is the main field of Chapulineros de Oaxaca, after the club left the field attached to the Estadio Tecnológico de Oaxaca due to schedule problems with other events.
