= Industriales Naucalpan F.C. =

Mexican football club

Industriales Naucalpan
- Full name: Industriales Naucalpan Fútbol Club
- Nickname: Industriales
- Founded: 27 March 2020; 6 years ago
- Dissolved: 1 September 2020; 5 years ago
- Ground: Deportivo Barrientos Luis García Postigo; Tlalnepantla, State of Mexico
- Capacity: 1,000
- President: Leonardo Ramos
- Manager: Aarón Huesca
- League: Liga de Balompié Mexicano
| Home colours | Away colours |

Industriales Naucalpan Fútbol Club, commonly referred to as Industriales Naucalpan was a Mexican professional football club based in Tlalnepantla, State of Mexico that competed in the Liga de Balompié Mexicano.

== History ==
Industriales Naucalpan was established on March 27, 2020 as one of the founding members of the Liga de Balompié Mexicano. The club was owned and operated by a group of local businessmen from Naucalpan, State of Mexico.

On July 21, 2020 the club presented Ricardo Carbajal as manager of the club.

Industriales had long-term plans which included fielding a women's football team and building a sports hospital and their own stadium in Naucalpan.

== Stadium ==
The club initially announced that it would be playing their home games at the Estadio José Ortega Martínez, which has a capacity of 3,700 seated spectators and it is property of the Universidad del Valle de México. Nevertheless, in July 2020, it was stated that negotiations between the university and the club did not succeed because American football team Raptors Naucalpan, also playing at the Estadio José Ortega Martínez, refused to share the stadium with Industriales. The team later reached an agreement with the Raptors and returned to the originally planned stadium. Industriales Naucalpan was later relocated to Tlalnepantla and began playing their home matches in the Deportivo Barrientos Luis García Postigo stadium.

== Players ==
=== First-team squad ===
As of 1 September 2021

== Personnel ==
=== Coaching staff ===
| Position | Staff |
|---|---|
| Manager | (Mexico) Edgar Acosta |

=== Management ===
| Position | Name |
|---|---|
| President | (Mexico) Leonardo Ramos |
| General Director | (Mexico) Gustavo Ortiz |
| Sports Director | (Mexico) Héctor Anguiano |
