= Halcones de Querétaro =

- Full name: Club de Fútbol Halcones de Querétaro, S.A. de C.V.
- Nickname: Halcones
- Founded: 1997, 2021
- Ground: Unidad Deportiva de Cadereyta; Cadereyta, Querétaro, Mexico
- Capacity: 1,100
- League: Segunda División de Balompié Mexicano
Home colours	Away colours

Club de Fútbol Halcones de Querétaro is a Mexican football team that played in the Primera División 'A' de México and Segunda División de México and currently plays in the Segunda División de Balompié Mexicano. They play their home team match games in Cadereyta, Querétaro.

== History ==
The club was founded in 1997 as a subsidiary team of América, whose objective was to train youth players for that squad and give space to players who had no place in the main team. The team competed in Primera División 'A' de México until 2001, to later be disbanded.

In 2021, the Limsoccer F.C. board began procedures to join the Liga de Balompié Mexicano after having problems participating in the Tercera División de México and USPL MX leagues. In July, the team was accepted as a new member of the LBM, and in August the club was renamed Halcones de Quéretaro and was moved to Cadereyta, Querétaro.

== Honours ==
- Segunda División de Balompié Mexicano:

2023
