= San Jerónimo Tlacochahuaya =

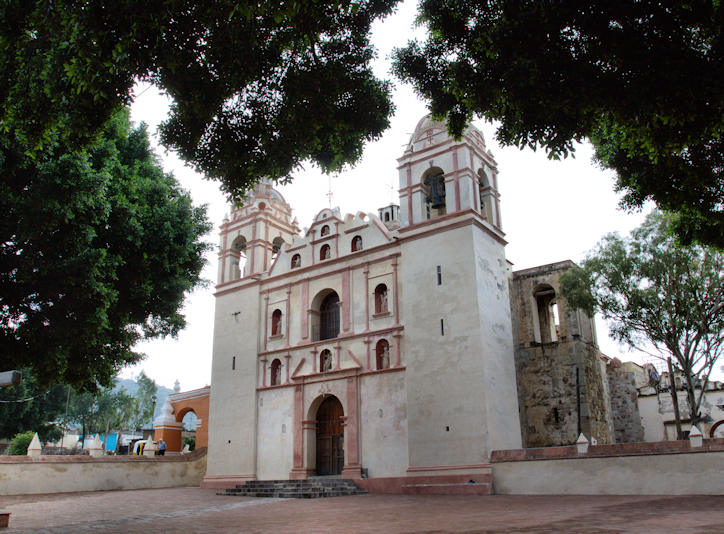
- Templo de San Jerónimo

- Location within Mexico
- Coordinates: 17°00′32″N 96°34′51″W
- Country: Mexico
- State: Oaxaca
- Municipal Seat: San Jerónimo Tlacochahuaya
- Elevation: 1,180 m (3,870 ft)
- Time zone: UTC-6 (Central (US Central))
- Website: www.tlacochahuaya.gob.mx

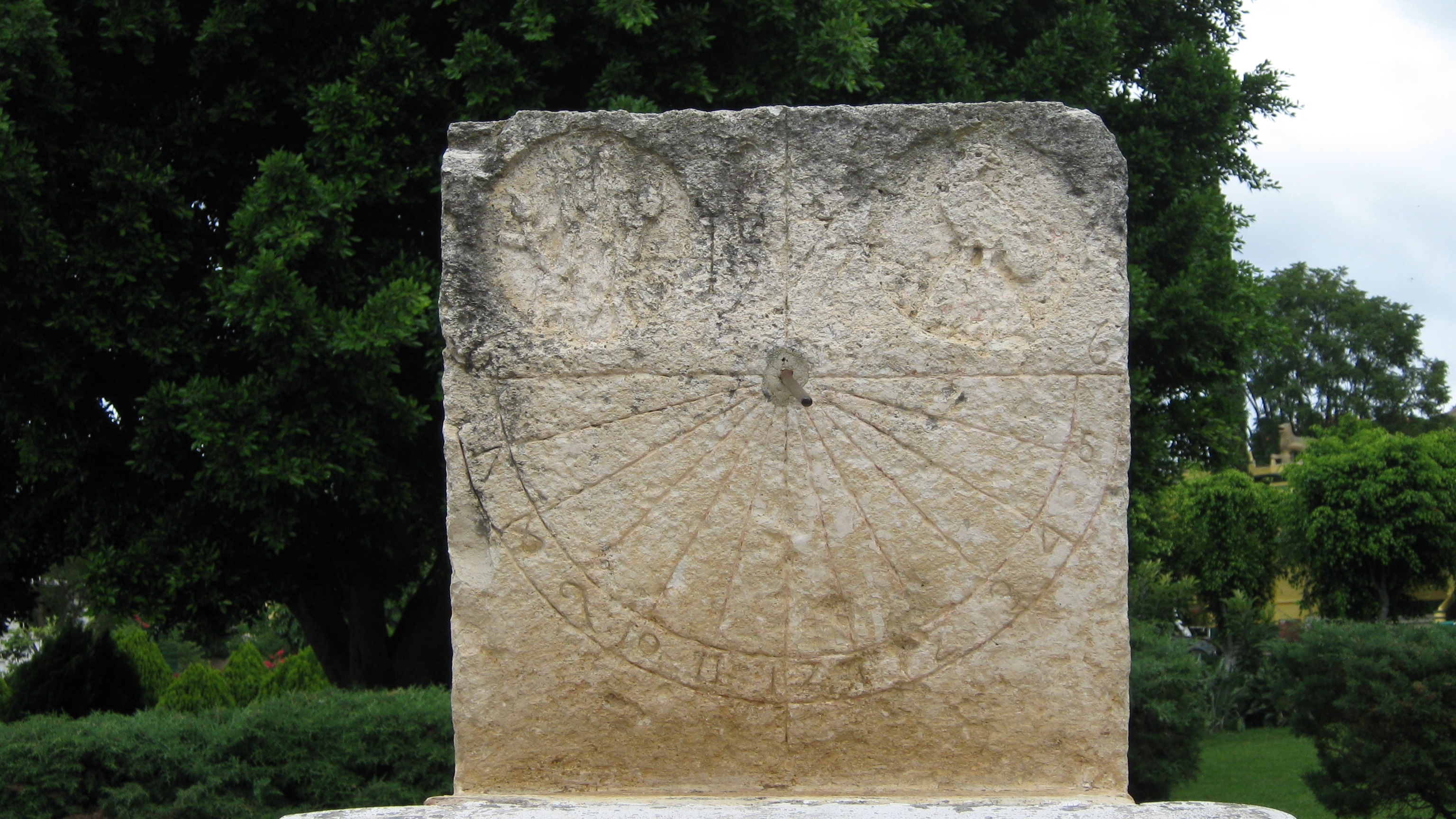
The sundial on the church patio

San Jerónimo Tlacochahuaya is a little town and municipality in the Mexican state of Oaxaca, 21 km from the city of Oaxaca on Federal Highway 190 between Santa Maria del Tule and Mitla.

== The municipality ==
The main economic activities are agriculture (corn, garlic, beans and various fruits), dairy farming and the production of mezcal. As municipal seat, San Jerónimo Tlacochahuaya has governing jurisdiction over the following communities: La Loma, Luis Alonso León, Macuilxóchitl de Artigas Carranza and Ojo de Agua.
