= Liga de Balompié Mexicano =

Mexican football league

- Founded: 29 January 2020; 6 years ago
- Folded: 25 February 2025; 19 months ago
- Country: Mexico
- Confederation: CONIFA
- Number of clubs: 10
- Last champions: Kundavi FC (2024-A)
- Most championships: Chapulineros de Oaxaca (5 titles)
- Website: Official website
- Current: 2024 season

Liga de Balompié Mexicano was a semi-professional football league in Mexico. It is the first division of the league system of the National Association of Mexican Football (ANBM in Spanish).

The league is an "alternate" to Liga MX, which is organized by the Mexican Football Federation (the only entity representing Mexico before FIFA), thus not recognized by FIFA. On 8 July 2020 the Liga de Balompié Mexicano became the first national league sanctioned by CONIFA. Following the conclusion of the 2024 season in the middle of that year, the league was dissolved in February 2025 after the ANBM indefinitely suspended the league's operations and all its categories.

== History ==
The Liga de Balompié Mexicano (Mexican Football League) was presented on 29 January 2020 with the aim of providing another development opportunity to football players who did not get a place in one of the teams in the main Mexican football leagues, in addition to bringing "professional" football to locations that have not had sufficient presence of sports institutions or do not have adequate facilities to participate in Liga MX or Ascenso MX.

On 22 February 2020 the first league team assembly was held. On 8 July 2020 it was announced that the LBM would be the first league sanctioned by CONIFA.

On 14 October 2020, the first official game of the ilegal LBM was played, in the match, San José F.C. defeated Morelos F.C. by score of 1–0. Omar Rosas scored the first goal in the history of the competition.

== Competition format ==
The league's teams will play one single table tournament per season. The top finisher of the league table will advance directly to the championship final, known as the Super Final at the end of the regular cycle. The clubs classified in the second, third, fourth and fifth positions will qualify to a final phase to determine the second championship finalist. Tiebreaker criteria in the semifinal stage are in the following order: Global score, away goals and general table. A tie score after regulation time in the championship final will be resolved by penalty shoot-out.

Unike most football tournaments, two points are awarded for victory, zero for a draw. Teams have the right to enroll five foreign players, however, only three can participate on the field of play.

Teams must meet infrastructure obligations in order to participate in the League, including stadiums with a minimum capacity of 5,000 spectators, along with keeping their facilities in good conditions.

== Teams ==
Liga de Balompié Mexicano Official Teams
Liga de Balompié Mexicano 2024 Official Teams (Greater Mexico City)

Teams	City	Stadium	Capacity
Official members of ANBM
Albiazul	Tultitlán, State of Mexico	Deportivo Cartagena	3,000
Chapulineros de Oaxaca	San Jerónimo Tlacochahuaya, Oaxaca	Independiente MRCI	3,000
EFIX Soccer Club	Xalapa, Veracruz	Instalaciones Deportivas EFIX	500
Hidalgo	Atitalaquía, Hidalgo	Ciudad Deportiva 20 de Noviembre	1,000
Industriales Naucalpan	Huixquilucan, State of Mexico	Alberto Pérez Navarro	3,000
Inter Puerto Escondido	Puerto Escondido, Oaxaca	Benito Juárez	1,000
Kundavi	Río Grande, Oaxaca	Inocente Santos Luna	1,000
Mezcaleros de Oaxaca	San Jerónimo Tlacochahuaya, Oaxaca	Independiente MRCI	3,000
Neza	Chalco, State of Mexico	Arreola	3,217
Toros México FC	Álvaro Obregón, Mexico City	Deportivo Valentín Gómez Farías	500

=== Champions ===
Club	Winners	Winning seasons
Chapulineros de Oaxaca	5	2020–21, 2021, 2022, 2023-A, 2023-B
Kundavi FC	1	2024 A
