= List of Mexican football transfers summer 2015 =

This is the list of Mexican football transfers in the Mexican Primera Division during the summer 2015 transfer window, grouped by club. It only includes football transfers related to clubs in Liga Bancomer MX, the first division of Mexican football.

== Liga Bancomer MX ==
=== América ===
In: Note: Flags indicate national team as defined under FIFA eligibility rules; some limited exceptions apply. Players may hold more than one non-FIFA nationality.

No.	Pos.	Nation	Player
3	DF	(Mexico) MEX	Gil Burón (loan return from Querétaro)
5	MF	(Mexico) MEX	Javier Güemez (from Tijuana)
7	MF	(Mexico) MEX	Adrián Marín (on loan from Chiapas)
8	MF	(Colombia) COL	Andrés Andrade (loan return from Chiapas)
11	FW	(Ecuador) ECU	Michael Arroyo (from Atlante, previously on loan)
15	DF	(Mexico) MEX	Osmar Mares (from Santos Laguna, previously on loan)
––	FW	(Mexico) MEX	Alberto García (on loan from Atlante, previously on loan at Guadalajara)

Out: Note: Flags indicate national team as defined under FIFA eligibility rules; some limited exceptions apply. Players may hold more than one non-FIFA nationality.

No.	Pos.	Nation	Player
5	MF	(Argentina) ARG	Cristian Pellerano (on loan to Morelia)
8	MF	(Mexico) MEX	Moisés Velasco (loan return to Toluca)
16	MF	(Mexico) MEX	Jesús Leal (on loan to Sonora)
20	MF	(Argentina) ARG	Gonzalo Díaz (Released)
27	MF	(Mexico) MEX	José Madueña (loan return to Tijuana)
––	GK	(Mexico) MEX	Carlos López (on loan to Atlético SL, previously on loan at Morelia)
––	MF	(Mexico) MEX	Carlos Gutiérrez (on loan to Puebla, previously on loan at Zacatecas)
––	MF	(Mexico) MEX	José Joaquín Martínez (to Pachuca, previously on loan at Necaxa)

=== Atlas ===
In: Note: Flags indicate national team as defined under FIFA eligibility rules; some limited exceptions apply. Players may hold more than one non-FIFA nationality.

No.	Pos.	Nation	Player
1	GK	(Chile) CHI	Miguel Pinto (from Correcaminos UAT)
2	DF	(Mexico) MEX	Juan Carlos Pineda (on loan from León)
4	DF	(United States) USA	Greg Garza (on loan from Tijuana)
9	FW	(Argentina) ARG	Gonzalo Bergessio (from (Italy) Sampdoria)
11	FW	(Colombia) COL	Franco Arizala (from León, previously on loan at Chiapas)
12	MF	(Mexico) MEX	Rodolfo Vilchis (from U de G)
13	MF	(Mexico) MEX	Jorge Zárate (on loan from Morelia)
14	MF	(Mexico) MEX	Daniel Hernández (loan return from Atlante)
17	MF	(Mexico) MEX	Rodolfo Salinas (on loan from Santos Laguna)
19	MF	(Colombia) COL	Eisner Loboa (on loan from Puebla)
23	DF	(Panama) PAN	Felipe Baloy (on loan from Morelia)
24	DF	(Mexico) MEX	Rodrigo Godínez (on loan from Morelia, previously on loan)
25	MF	(Mexico) MEX	Luis Télles (loan return from U de G)
27	MF	(Mexico) MEX	Juan Pablo Vigón (loan return from Atlético SL)
29	MF	(Uruguay) URU	Cristian Tabó (from (Uruguay) Nacional)
83	DF	(Mexico) MEX	Giovanni León (loan return from U de G)

Out: Note: Flags indicate national team as defined under FIFA eligibility rules; some limited exceptions apply. Players may hold more than one non-FIFA nationality.

No.	Pos.	Nation	Player
1	DF	(United States) USA	Edgar Castillo (to Monterrey)
2	DF	(Mexico) MEX	Enrique Pérez (on loan to Morelia)
3	GK	(Argentina) ARG	Federico Vilar (to Tijuana)
4	DF	(Mexico) MEX	Luis Gerardo Venegas (to Chiapas)
10	MF	(Mexico) MEX	Juan Pablo Rodríguez (on loan to Morelia)
11	FW	(Mexico) MEX	Carlos Ochoa (loan return to Santos Laguna)
13	FW	(Ecuador) ECU	Christian Suárez (on loan to Dorados)
14	MF	(Mexico) MEX	Carlos Treviño (on loan to Necaxa)
19	MF	(Mexico) MEX	Edy Brambila (loan return to Toluca)
20	MF	(Chile) CHI	Rodrigo Millar (on loan to Morelia)
––	DF	(Argentina) ARG	Facundo Erpen (on loan to Morelia, previously on loan at Puebla)
––	DF	(Mexico) MEX	Jesús Paganoni (to Veracruz, previously on loan)
––	MF	(Mexico) MEX	Sergio Ponce (on loan to Tepic)
––	MF	(Mexico) MEX	Luis Robles (on loan to Puebla, previously on loan)
––	MF	(Mexico) MEX	Flavio Santos (on loan to Puebla, previously on loan)
––	FW	(Mexico) MEX	Matías Vuoso (Released)
––	MF	(Bolivia) BOL	José Luis Chávez (Released)
––	FW	(Mexico) MEX	Jahir Barraza (on loan to Necaxa)

=== Chiapas ===
In: Note: Flags indicate national team as defined under FIFA eligibility rules; some limited exceptions apply. Players may hold more than one non-FIFA nationality.

No.	Pos.	Nation	Player
1	GK	(Mexico) MEX	Jorge Villalpando (from Morelia)
4	DF	(Mexico) MEX	Luis Gerardo Venegas (from Atlas)
8	MF	(Mexico) MEX	Pedro Vargas (on loan from Tapachula)
14	FW	(Mexico) MEX	Luis Loroña (from on loan from Querétaro, previously on loan at Puebla)
16	FW	(Mexico) MEX	Darío Carreño (from Tigres UANL)
19	FW	(Mexico) MEX	Daniel González (on loan from Toluca)
20	DF	(Mexico) MEX	Félix Araujo (loan return from U de G)
29	DF	(Argentina) ARG	Juan Insaurralde (from (Russia) Spartak Moscow)
––	MF	(Mexico) MEX	Jehu Chiapas (from Veracruz)

Out: Note: Flags indicate national team as defined under FIFA eligibility rules; some limited exceptions apply. Players may hold more than one non-FIFA nationality.

No.	Pos.	Nation	Player
4	DF	(Mexico) MEX	Édgar Dueñas (Released)
7	MF	(Brazil) BRA	Wilson Tiago (loan return to Veracruz)
8	MF	(Mexico) MEX	Christian Bermúdez (on loan to Puebla)
9	MF	(Mexico) MEX	Alberto Medina (loan return to Puebla)
10	MF	(Colombia) COL	Andrés Andrade (loan return to América)
11	FW	(Colombia) COL	Franco Arizala (loan return to León)
12	DF	(Mexico) MEX	Horacio Cervantes (loan return to Cruz Azul)
13	MF	(Mexico) MEX	Adrián Marín (on loan to América)
14	FW	(Chile) CHI	Isaac Díaz (on loan to Puebla)
15	DF	(Mexico) MEX	Juan Carlos Rojas (loan return to Pachuca)
16	MF	(Mexico) MEX	Hugo Bueno (on loan to Venados)
17	MF	(Mexico) MEX	César Villaluz (on loan to Atlético SL)
19	FW	(Mexico) MEX	Mauricio Romero (on loan to Venados)
20	MF	(Mexico) MEX	Alan Zamora (loan return to Querétaro)
28	GK	(Mexico) MEX	Sergio García (loan return to Tigres UANL)
––	GK	(Mexico) MEX	Alfredo Frausto (on loan to Dorados, previously on loan)
––	DF	(United States) USA	Michael Orozco (to Tijuana, previously on loan at Puebla)
––	FW	(Mexico) MEX	Matías Vuoso (loan return to Atlas)

=== Cruz Azul ===
In: Note: Flags indicate national team as defined under FIFA eligibility rules; some limited exceptions apply. Players may hold more than one non-FIFA nationality.

No.	Pos.	Nation	Player
5	DF	(Brazil) BRA	Fábio Santos (from (Brazil) Corinthians)
7	MF	(Brazil) BRA	Lucas Silva (from Monterrey)
8	MF	(Spain) ESP	Marc Crosas (from U de G)
18	MF	(Argentina) ARG	Ariel Rojas (from (Argentina) River Plate)
19	FW	(Mexico) MEX	Jerónimo Amione (loan return from Toluca)
23	MF	(Mexico) MEX	Richard Ruiz (from Tijuana)
25	MF	(Argentina) ARG	Fernando Belluschi (from (Turkey) Bursaspor)
27	FW	(Paraguay) PAR	Jorge Benítez (on loan from (Greece) Olympiacos)
30	FW	(Mexico) MEX	Matías Vuoso (from Atlas)

Out: Note: Flags indicate national team as defined under FIFA eligibility rules; some limited exceptions apply. Players may hold more than one non-FIFA nationality.

No.	Pos.	Nation	Player
5	MF	(Mexico) MEX	Alejandro Castro (on loan to UNAM)
7	MF	(Colombia) COL	Carlos Lizarazo (released)
8	FW	(Brazil) BRA	Alemão (loan return to (Brazil) Ponte Preta)
18	FW	(Mexico) MEX	Ismael Valadéz (on loan to Tapachula)
19	MF	(Mexico) MEX	Alejandro Vela (Released)
33	MF	(Argentina) ARG	Mauro Formica (to (Argentina) Newell's Old Boys)
––	GK	(Mexico) MEX	Gibran Lajud (to Tijuana, previously on loan)
––	GK	(Mexico) MEX	Óscar Pérez (on loan to Pachuca, previously on loan)
––	DF	(Mexico) MEX	Horacio Cervantes (on loan to Veracruz, previously on loan at Chiapas)
––	DF	(Mexico) MEX	Francisco Flores (on loan to Pachuca)
––	FW	(Mexico) MEX	Aníbal Zurdo (on loan to Veracruz, previously on loan at (Spain) Sabadell)

=== Guadalajara ===
In: Note: Flags indicate national team as defined under FIFA eligibility rules; some limited exceptions apply. Players may hold more than one non-FIFA nationality.

No.	Pos.	Nation	Player
2	DF	(Mexico) MEX	Oswaldo Alanís (from Santos Laguna)
6	DF	(Mexico) MEX	Edwin Hernández (on loan from León)
19	FW	(Mexico) MEX	Michel Vázquez (on loan from BUAP)
23	FW	(Mexico) MEX	Ángel Zaldívar (loan return from Tepic)
24	FW	(Mexico) MEX	Carlos Cisneros (loan return from Tepic)
25	MF	(Mexico) MEX	Michael Pérez (loan return from Tepic)
28	DF	(Mexico) MEX	Miguel Basulto (loan return from Tepic)
30	GK	(Mexico) MEX	Rodolfo Cota (on loan from Pachuca)

Out: Note: Flags indicate national team as defined under FIFA eligibility rules; some limited exceptions apply. Players may hold more than one non-FIFA nationality.

No.	Pos.	Nation	Player
2	DF	(Mexico) MEX	Néstor Vidrio (on loan to Sinaloa)
3	DF	(Mexico) MEX	Kristian Álvarez (on loan to Santos Laguna)
5	DF	(Mexico) MEX	Patricio Araujo (to Puebla)
6	DF	(Mexico) MEX	Omar Esparza (on loan to Pachuca)
7	FW	(Mexico) MEX	Rafael Márquez Lugo (retired)
11	FW	(Mexico) MEX	Aldo de Nigris (to Monterrey)
15	MF	(Mexico) MEX	Fernando Arce (on loan to Sinaloa)
19	MF	(Mexico) MEX	David Toledo (on loan to Puebla)
23	FW	(Mexico) MEX	Alberto García (loan return to Atlante)
25	MF	(Mexico) MEX	Antonio Gallardo (on loan to Necaxa)
28	MF	(Mexico) MEX	Giovani Hernández (on loan to Sinaloa)
29	GK	(Mexico) MEX	Luis Michel (to Sinaloa)
31	FW	(Mexico) MEX	Erick Torres (loan return to (United States) Houston Dynamo)
34	GK	(Mexico) MEX	Miguel Jiménez (on loan to Tepic)
––	GK	(Mexico) MEX	Víctor Hugo Hernández (on loan to Necaxa, previously on loan at Querétaro)
––	GK	(Mexico) MEX	Raúl Gudiño (to (Portugal) FC Porto, previously on loan)
––	DF	(Mexico) MEX	Abraham Coronado (on loan to Necaxa, previously on loan at Toluca)
––	MF	(Mexico) MEX	Víctor Guzmán (on loan to Pachuca)
––	MF	(Mexico) MEX	Luis Ernesto Pérez (on loan to Monterrey)

=== León ===
In: Note: Flags indicate national team as defined under FIFA eligibility rules; some limited exceptions apply. Players may hold more than one non-FIFA nationality.

No.	Pos.	Nation	Player
2	DF	(Mexico) MEX	Efraín Velarde (on loan from Monterrey)
3	DF	(Argentina) ARG	Guillermo Burdisso (from (Argentina) Boca Juniors)
6	DF	(Argentina) ARG	Diego Novaretti (from (Italy) Lazio)
7	MF	(Colombia) COL	Hernán Burbano (from Tigres UANL)
11	FW	(Mexico) MEX	Marco Bueno (on loan from Pachuca)
14	MF	(United States) USA	Miguel Ibarra (from (United States) Minnesota United)
15	MF	(Mexico) MEX	Steven Almeida (on loan from Pachuca)
31	MF	(Ecuador) ECU	Jonathan Gonzales (from UDG)

Out: Note: Flags indicate national team as defined under FIFA eligibility rules; some limited exceptions apply. Players may hold more than one non-FIFA nationality.

No.	Pos.	Nation	Player
2	DF	(Mexico) MEX	Iván Pineda (on loan to Atlas)
4	DF	(Argentina) ARG	Ignacio Canuto (released)
6	MF	(Mexico) MEX	José María Cárdenas (to Tijuana)
7	DF	(Mexico) MEX	Edwin Hernández (on loan to Guadalajara)
11	MF	(Ecuador) ECU	Marcos Caicedo (on loan to Sinaloa)
14	FW	(Argentina) ARG	Martín Bravo (on loan to Sinaloa)
15	DF	(Argentina) ARG	Jonathan Bottinelli (released)
21	DF	(Mexico) MEX	Luis Delgado (on loan to Mineros de Zacatecas)
––	MF	(Colombia) COL	Eisner Loboa (on loan to Atlas), previously on loan at Chiapas
––	MF	(Brazil) BRA	Derley (on loan to Juárez), previously on loan at Mineros de Zacatecas
––	FW	(Uruguay) URU	Nelson Maz (on loan to Juárez), previously on loan at Mineros de Zacatecas

=== Monterrey ===
In: Note: Flags indicate national team as defined under FIFA eligibility rules; some limited exceptions apply. Players may hold more than one non-FIFA nationality.

No.	Pos.	Nation	Player
4	DF	(Mexico) MEX	Ricardo Osorio (loan return from Querétaro)
5	MF	(Uruguay) URU	Walter Gargano (from (Italy) Napoli)
7	FW	(Argentina) ARG	Rogelio Funes Mori (from (Portugal) Benfica, previously on loan at (Turkey) Eskişehirspor)
9	FW	(Mexico) MEX	Aldo de Nigris (from Guadalajara)
15	DF	(United States) USA	Edgar Castillo (from Atlas)
27	MF	(Mexico) MEX	Luis Ernesto Pérez (on loan from Guadalajara)

Out: Note: Flags indicate national team as defined under FIFA eligibility rules; some limited exceptions apply. Players may hold more than one non-FIFA nationality.

No.	Pos.	Nation	Player
5	DF	(Mexico) MEX	Dárvin Chávez (on loan to Veracruz)
7	MF	(Brazil) BRA	Lucas Silva (to Cruz Azul)
9	FW	(Colombia) COL	Yimmi Chará (on loan to (Colombia) Atlético Nacional)
11	FW	(Mexico) MEX	Guillermo Madrigal (on loan to Querétaro)
19	FW	(Argentina) ARG	César Delgado (to (Argentina) Rosario Central)
22	DF	(Mexico) MEX	Efraín Velarde (on loan to León)
24	MF	(Mexico) MEX	Gael Acosta (on loan to UAT)
27	FW	(Mexico) MEX	Omar Arellano (to Toluca)

=== Morelia ===
In: Note: Flags indicate national team as defined under FIFA eligibility rules; some limited exceptions apply. Players may hold more than one non-FIFA nationality.

No.	Pos.	Nation	Player
5	DF	(Argentina) ARG	Facundo Erpen (on loan from Atlas)
7	MF	(Argentina) ARG	Cristian Pellerano (on loan from América)
8	MF	(Mexico) MEX	Juan Pablo Rodríguez (on loan from Atlas)
11	FW	(Mexico) MEX	Carlos Ochoa (on loan from Santos Laguna)
13	GK	(Mexico) MEX	Cirilo Saucedo (on loan from Tijuana)
14	DF	(Argentina) ARG	Marco Torsiglieri (from (Ukraine) Metalist Kharkiv)
16	FW	(Paraguay) PAR	Pablo Velázquez (from (Colombia) Atlético Nacional)
18	MF	(Mexico) MEX	Dieter Villalpando (on loan from Pachuca)
19	DF	(Mexico) MEX	Enrique Pérez (loan return from Atlas)
20	MF	(Chile) CHI	Rodrigo Millar (on loan from Atlas)
25	DF	(Mexico) MEX	Carlos Calvo (on loan from Atlante, previously on loan)

Out: Note: Flags indicate national team as defined under FIFA eligibility rules; some limited exceptions apply. Players may hold more than one non-FIFA nationality.

No.	Pos.	Nation	Player
4	DF	(Mexico) MEX	Luis Fernando Silva (on loan to Atlante)
5	DF	(Mexico) MEX	Carlos Guzmán (on loan to Tijuana)
7	DF	(Panama) PAN	Felipe Baloy (on loan to Atlas)
10	FW	(Slovakia) SVK	David Depetris (released)
11	MF	(Mexico) MEX	Luis Ángel Morales (on loan to UAT)
13	MF	(Mexico) MEX	Jorge Zárate (on loan to Atlas)
16	DF	(Uruguay) URU	Rafael García (loan return to (Uruguay) Nacional)
19	DF	(Paraguay) PAR	Luis Cardozo (loan return to (Paraguay) Cerro Porteño)
21	GK	(Mexico) MEX	Jorge Villalpando (on loan to Chiapas)
30	MF	(Mexico) MEX	Víctor Guajardo (on loan to UAT)
1	GK	(Mexico) MEX	Fabián Villaseñor (on loan to Puebla, previously on loan)
9	FW	(Chile) CHI	Héctor Mancilla (on loan to Sinaloa, previously on loan at (Chile) Huachipato)

=== Pachuca ===
In: Note: Flags indicate national team as defined under FIFA eligibility rules; some limited exceptions apply. Players may hold more than one non-FIFA nationality.

No.	Pos.	Nation	Player
2	DF	(Mexico) MEX	Francisco Flores (on loan from Cruz Azul)
4	DF	(Mexico) MEX	Hugo Rodríguez (from Tigres UANL)
5	MF	(Mexico) MEX	Víctor Guzmán (on loan from Guadalajara)
6	DF	(Mexico) MEX	Omar Esparza (on loan from Guadalajara)
10	MF	(Uruguay) URU	Jonathan Urretaviscaya (on loan from (Portugal) Paços de Ferreira)
11	MF	(Argentina) ARG	Rubén Botta (from (Italy) Internazionale)
18	MF	(Mexico) MEX	José Joaquín Martínez (from América)
21	GK	(Mexico) MEX	Óscar Pérez (from Cruz Azul, previously on loan)
29	FW	(Argentina) ARG	Franco Jara (from Olympiacos)
31	GK	(Uruguay) URU	Sebastián Sosa (from (Argentina) Vélez Sársfield)

Out: Note: Flags indicate national team as defined under FIFA eligibility rules; some limited exceptions apply. Players may hold more than one non-FIFA nationality.

No.	Pos.	Nation	Player
2	DF	(Mexico) MEX	Heriberto Aguayo (loan return to Zacatecas)
4	DF	(Mexico) MEX	Marco Iván Pérez (on loan to Zacatecas)
6	MF	(Mexico) MEX	Diego de Buen (to Tijuana)
25	MF	(Mexico) MEX	Jürgen Damm (to Tigres UANL)
26	MF	(Mexico) MEX	Steven Almeida (on loan to León)
27	MF	(Ecuador) ECU	Junior Sornoza (on loan to Zacatecas)
29	MF	(Mexico) MEX	Rodrigo Salinas (to Tijuana)
––	GK	(Mexico) MEX	Rodolfo Cota (on loan to Guadalajara, previously on loan at Puebla)
––	DF	(Paraguay) PAR	Paulo da Silva (to Toluca, previously on loan)
––	MF	(Mexico) MEX	Dieter Villalpando (on loan to Morelia, previously on loan at Tigres UANL)
––	FW	(Mexico) MEX	Marco Bueno (on loan to León, previously on loan at Toluca)
––	FW	(Mexico) MEX	Enrique Esqueda (on loan to Tigres UANL, previously on loan)
––	FW	(Mexico) MEX	Víctor Mañón (on loan to Celaya, previously on loan at Veracruz)

=== Puebla ===
In: Note: Flags indicate national team as defined under FIFA eligibility rules; some limited exceptions apply. Players may hold more than one non-FIFA nationality.

No.	Pos.	Nation	Player
1	GK	(Mexico) MEX	Fabián Villaseñor (on loan from Morelia, previously on loan)
2	DF	(Uruguay) URU	Robert Herrera (from (Uruguay) Defensor Sporting)
3	MF	(Mexico) MEX	Carlos Gutiérrez (on loan from América)
8	MF	(Mexico) MEX	Luis Robles (on loan from Atlas, previously on loan)
9	FW	(Chile) CHI	Isaac Díaz (on loan from Chiapas)
10	MF	(Mexico) MEX	Christian Bermúdez (on loan from Chiapas)
13	MF	(Mexico) MEX	Alfonso Tamay (on loan from UANL, previously on loan)
16	MF	(Mexico) MEX	David Toledo (on loan from Guadalajara)
17	GK	(Argentina) ARG	Cristian Campestrini (from (Paraguay) Olimpia)
19	MF	(Mexico) MEX	Flavio Santos (on loan from Atlas, previously on loan)
20	DF	(Mexico) MEX	Adrián Cortés (on loan from Veracruz)
21	DF	(Uruguay) URU	Ramón Arias (on loan from (Uruguay) Defensor Sporting)
22	DF	(Mexico) MEX	Patricio Araujo (from Guadalajara)
23	DF	(Mexico) MEX	Emmanuel Gil (on loan from Veracruz)
27	MF	(Mexico) MEX	Alberto Acosta (on loan from Tigres UANL, previously on loan)
28	MF	(Mexico) MEX	Francisco Torres (on loan from Santos Laguna, previously on loan)
29	FW	(Argentina) ARG	Ezequiel Rescaldani (on loan from (Spain) Málaga)
30	GK	(United States) USA	Austin Guerrero (from Tapachula, previously on loan)

Out: Note: Flags indicate national team as defined under FIFA eligibility rules; some limited exceptions apply. Players may hold more than one non-FIFA nationality.

No.	Pos.	Nation	Player
2	DF	(Colombia) COL	Efraín Cortés (on loan to Juárez)
4	DF	(Argentina) ARG	Facundo Erpen (loan return to Atlas)
7	MF	(Mexico) MEX	Luis Miguel Noriega (loan return to Querétaro)
8	MF	(Mexico) MEX	Gerardo Espinoza (loan return to Querétaro)
10	MF	(Mexico) MEX	Cuauhtémoc Blanco (retired)
14	FW	(Mexico) MEX	Luis Loroña (loan return to Querétaro)
16	DF	(United States) USA	Michael Orozco (loan return to Chiapas)
20	MF	(Colombia) COL	Eisner Loboa (to Atlas)
22	FW	(Colombia) COL	John Pajoy (released)
25	MF	(Mexico) MEX	Pablo González (on loan to Tapachula)
26	DF	(Argentina) ARG	Mauricio Romero (to Sinaloa)
29	FW	(Colombia) COL	Wilberto Cosme (loan return to Querétaro)
30	GK	(Mexico) MEX	Rodolfo Cota (loan return to Pachuca)
––	GK	(Mexico) MEX	Iván Rodríguez (unregistered, on loan to Tapachula)

=== Querétaro ===
In: Note: Flags indicate national team as defined under FIFA eligibility rules; some limited exceptions apply. Players may hold more than one non-FIFA nationality.

No.	Pos.	Nation	Player
6	DF	(Argentina) ARG	Juan Forlín (on loan from (Qatar) Al Rayyan)
12	DF	(United States) USA	Jonathan Bornstein (from UANL, previously on loan)
14	MF	(Mexico) MEX	Luis Miguel Noriega (loan return from Puebla)
19	MF	(Colombia) COL	Yerson Candelo (from (Colombia) Deportivo Cali)
24	FW	(Paraguay) PAR	Edgar Benítez (from Toluca)
27	FW	(Mexico) MEX	Guillermo Madrigal (on loan from Monterrey)
29	MF	(Brazil) BRA	Wilson Tiago (on loan from Veracruz, previously on loan at Chiapas)

Out: Note: Flags indicate national team as defined under FIFA eligibility rules; some limited exceptions apply. Players may hold more than one non-FIFA nationality.

No.	Pos.	Nation	Player
6	DF	(Mexico) MEX	Ricardo Osorio (loan return to Monterrey)
9	FW	(Chile) CHI	Patricio Rubio (on loan to U. de Chile)
13	DF	(Mexico) MEX	Gil Burón (loan return to América)
22	MF	(Mexico) MEX	Édgar Pacheco (loan return to Tigres UANL)
24	MF	(Mexico) MEX	Emilio López (on loan to Venados)
49	FW	(Brazil) BRA	Ronaldinho (to (Brazil) Fluminense)
––	GK	(Mexico) MEX	Hugo Hernández (loan return to Guadalajara)
––	DF	(Mexico) MEX	Raúl Rico (on loan to Sonora)
––	MF	(Mexico) MEX	Gerardo Espinoza (on loan to BUAP, previously on loan at Puebla)
––	FW	(Colombia) COL	Wilberto Cosme (on loan to Coras Tepic, previously on loan at Puebla)
––	FW	(Mexico) MEX	Luis Loroña (on loan to Chiapas, previously on loan at Puebla)

=== Santos Laguna ===
In: Note: Flags indicate national team as defined under FIFA eligibility rules; some limited exceptions apply. Players may hold more than one non-FIFA nationality.

No.	Pos.	Nation	Player
3	DF	(Mexico) MEX	Kristian Álvarez (on loan from Guadalajara)
10	MF	(Chile) CHI	Bryan Rabello (on loan from (Spain) Sevilla)

Out: Note: Flags indicate national team as defined under FIFA eligibility rules; some limited exceptions apply. Players may hold more than one non-FIFA nationality.

No.	Pos.	Nation	Player
2	DF	(Mexico) MEX	Oswaldo Alanís (to Guadalajara)
17	MF	(Mexico) MEX	Rodolfo Salinas (on loan to Atlas)
19	DF	(Mexico) MEX	Rafael Figueroa (on loan to UdeG)
––	DF	(Uruguay) URU	Jonathan Lacerda (to Dorados, previously on loan)
––	DF	(Mexico) MEX	Uriel Álvarez (to Tijuana, previously on loan at Dorados)
––	DF	(Mexico) MEX	Osmar Mares (to América, previously on loan)
––	MF	(Uruguay) URU	Ribair Rodríguez (on loan to UdeG, previously loan at (Uruguay) Nacional)
––	MF	(Mexico) MEX	Francisco Torres (to Puebla, previously on loan)
––	FW	(Mexico) MEX	Carlos Ochoa (on loan to Morelia, previously on loan at Atlas)

=== Sinaloa ===
In: Note: Flags indicate national team as defined under FIFA eligibility rules; some limited exceptions apply. Players may hold more than one non-FIFA nationality.

No.	Pos.	Nation	Player
1	GK	(Mexico) MEX	Luis Michel (from Guadalajara)
2	DF	(Mexico) MEX	Néstor Vidrio (on loan from Guadalajara)
3	DF	(Uruguay) URU	Jonathan Lacerda (from Santos Laguna, previously on loan)
4	DF	(Mexico) MEX	Jesús Chávez (on loan from Tijuana)
5	DF	(Mexico) MEX	Joshua Ábrego (on loan from Tijuana, previously on loan)
7	FW	(Ecuador) ECU	Christian Suárez (on loan from Pachuca, previously on loan at Atlas)
8	MF	(Mexico) MEX	Fernando Arce (on loan from Guadalajara)
9	FW	(Chile) CHI	Héctor Mancilla (on loan from Morelia, previously on loan at (Chile) Huachipato)
10	FW	(Argentina) ARG	Martín Bravo (on loan from León)
12	GK	(Mexico) MEX	Alfredo Frausto (on loan from Chiapas, previously on loan)
11	MF	(Ecuador) ECU	Marcos Caicedo (on loan from León)
13	MF	(Mexico) MEX	Javier Salas (on loan from Tijuana)
15	FW	(Mexico) MEX	Raúl Enríquez (on loan from Tijuana, previously on loan)
16	MF	(Mexico) MEX	Adolfo Domínguez (on loan from Tijuana, previously on loan)
18	DF	(Mexico) MEX	Daniel Arreola (from Pachuca, previously on loan at Morelia)
19	DF	(Mexico) MEX	Guillermo Rojas (from Atlante)
20	FW	(Panama) PAN	Roberto Nurse (from UAT, previously on loan)
23	DF	(Mexico) MEX	David Stringel (from Monterrey, previously on loan)
26	DF	(Argentina) ARG	Mauricio Romero (on loan from Morelia, previously on loan at Puebla)
33	MF	(Mexico) MEX	Giovani Hernández (on loan from Guadalajara)

Out: Note: Flags indicate national team as defined under FIFA eligibility rules; some limited exceptions apply. Players may hold more than one non-FIFA nationality.

No.	Pos.	Nation	Player

=== Tijuana ===
In: Note: Flags indicate national team as defined under FIFA eligibility rules; some limited exceptions apply. Players may hold more than one non-FIFA nationality.

No.	Pos.	Nation	Player
4	DF	(Mexico) MEX	Uriel Álvarez (on loan from Santos Laguna)
5	DF	(Mexico) MEX	Elio Castro (on loan from Dorados, previously on loan)
6	MF	(Mexico) MEX	José María Cárdenas (from León)
8	MF	(Mexico) MEX	Diego de Buen (from Pachuca)
10	FW	(Colombia) COL	Humberto Osorio (from Dorados)
15	DF	(Mexico) MEX	Carlos Guzmán (on loan from Morelia)
16	DF	(United States) USA	Michael Orozco (from Chiapas, previously on loan to Puebla)
23	FW	(Chile) CHI	Felipe Flores (from (Chile) Colo-Colo)
25	GK	(Mexico) MEX	Gibran Lajud (from Cruz Azul, previously on loan)
27	MF	(Mexico) MEX	José Madueña (loan return from América)
29	MF	(Mexico) MEX	Rodrigo Salinas (from Pachuca)
30	DF	(Colombia) COL	Leiton Jiménez (from Veracruz)
31	MF	(Mexico) MEX	Pedro Hernández (on loan from Dorados, previously on loan)
33	GK	(Argentina) ARG	Federico Vilar (from Atlas)
––	DF	(Mexico) MEX	Leonardo Bedolla (on loan from Dorados)

Out: Note: Flags indicate national team as defined under FIFA eligibility rules; some limited exceptions apply. Players may hold more than one non-FIFA nationality.

No.	Pos.	Nation	Player
4	DF	(Mexico) MEX	Jesús Chávez (on loan to Necaxa)
6	MF	(Mexico) MEX	Javier Güemez (to América)
8	FW	(Ecuador) ECU	José Ayoví (on loan to Tapachula)
13	GK	(Mexico) MEX	Cirilo Saucedo (on loan to Morelia)
15	MF	(United States) USA	Joe Corona (on loan to Veracruz)
21	DF	(Mexico) MEX	Óliver Ortiz (on loan to Necaxa)
23	MF	(Mexico) MEX	Richard Ruiz (to Cruz Azul)
24	DF	(United States) USA	Greg Garza (on loan to Atlas)
26	MF	(Mexico) MEX	Javier Salas (to Dorados)
––	DF	(Mexico) MEX	Joshua Abrego (on loan to Dorados, previously on loan)
––	FW	(Mexico) MEX	Raúl Enríquez (on loan to Dorados, previously on loan)

=== Toluca ===
In: Note: Flags indicate national team as defined under FIFA eligibility rules; some limited exceptions apply. Players may hold more than one non-FIFA nationality.

No.	Pos.	Nation	Player
4	DF	(Paraguay) PAR	Paulo da Silva (from Pachuca, previously on loan)
5	DF	(Mexico) MEX	Christian Pérez (on loan from Querétaro, previously on loan)
7	MF	(Mexico) MEX	Moisés Velasco (loan return from América)
8	FW	(Argentina) ARG	Nicolás Saucedo (from Correcaminos UAT)
13	FW	(Peru) PER	Christian Cueva (from (Peru) Alianza Lima)
17	FW	(Mexico) MEX	Diego Gama (loan return from (Spain) Atlético Madrid B)
18	MF	(Argentina) ARG	Darío Bottinelli (from (Chile) Universidad Católica)
19	MF	(Mexico) MEX	Edy Brambila (loan return from Atlas)
20	FW	(Colombia) COL	Fernando Uribe (from (Colombia) Millonarios)
21	FW	(Argentina) ARG	Enrique Triverio (from (Argentina) Unión de Santa Fe)
22	GK	(Mexico) MEX	Liborio Sánchez (on loan from Querétaro, previously on loan)
23	FW	(Mexico) MEX	Omar Arellano (on loan from Monterrey)

Out: Note: Flags indicate national team as defined under FIFA eligibility rules; some limited exceptions apply. Players may hold more than one non-FIFA nationality.

No.	Pos.	Nation	Player
7	FW	(Colombia) COL	Víctor Montaño (released)
13	MF	(Mexico) MEX	Abraham Coronado (loan return to Guadalajara)
17	MF	(Mexico) MEX	Marco Bueno (loan return to Pachuca)
19	FW	(Mexico) MEX	Jerónimo Amione (loan return to Cruz Azul)
20	DF	(Mexico) MEX	Miguel Almazán (on loan to Tapachula)
23	FW	(Paraguay) PAR	Edgar Benítez (to Querétaro)
24	MF	(Paraguay) PAR	Richard Ortiz (on loan to (Colombia) Independiente Santa Fe)
29	FW	(Mexico) MEX	Raúl Nava (on loan to Zacatecas)
––	FW	(Mexico) MEX	Daniel González (on loan to Chiapas)

=== UANL ===
In: Note: Flags indicate national team as defined under FIFA eligibility rules; some limited exceptions apply. Players may hold more than one non-FIFA nationality.

No.	Pos.	Nation	Player
10	FW	(France) FRA	André-Pierre Gignac (from (France) Marseille)
16	FW	(Mexico) MEX	Enrique Esqueda (on loan from Pachuca, previously on loan)
20	MF	(Mexico) MEX	Javier Aquino (from (Spain) Villarreal)
25	FW	(Mexico) MEX	Jürgen Damm (from Pachuca)
26	DF	(Mexico) MEX	Jairo González (on loan from UdeG)
28	FW	(Nigeria) NGA	Ikechukwu Uche (from (Spain) Villarreal)

Out: Note: Flags indicate national team as defined under FIFA eligibility rules; some limited exceptions apply. Players may hold more than one non-FIFA nationality.

No.	Pos.	Nation	Player
10	FW	(Colombia) COL	Darío Burbano (to León)
13	FW	(Mexico) MEX	Darío Carreño (to Chiapas)
18	FW	(Mexico) MEX	Dieter Villalpando (loan return to Pachuca)
27	DF	(Mexico) MEX	Hugo Rodríguez (to Pachuca)
––	GK	(Mexico) MEX	Sergio García (on loan to Veracruz, previously on loan at Chiapas)
––	DF	(United States) USA	Jonathan Bornstein (to Querétaro, previously on loan)
––	MF	(Brazil) BRA	Danilinho (to Querétaro, previously on loan)
––	MF	(Mexico) MEX	Alfonso Tamay (on loan to Puebla, previously on loan)
––	MF	(Mexico) MEX	Alberto Acosta (on loan to Puebla, previously on loan)
––	MF	(Mexico) MEX	Edgar Pacheco (on loan to Juárez previously on loan at Querétaro)

=== UNAM ===
In: Note: Flags indicate national team as defined under FIFA eligibility rules; some limited exceptions apply. Players may hold more than one non-FIFA nationality.

No.	Pos.	Nation	Player
11	FW	(Ecuador) ECU	Fidel Martínez (from UdeG)
16	DF	(Mexico) MEX	Marcelo Alatorre (from UdeG)
21	MF	(Mexico) MEX	Alejandro Castro (on loan from Cruz Azul)

Out: Note: Flags indicate national team as defined under FIFA eligibility rules; some limited exceptions apply. Players may hold more than one non-FIFA nationality.

No.	Pos.	Nation	Player
12	DF	(Mexico) MEX	José Antonio García (on loan to Zacatepec)
26	MF	(Mexico) MEX	Daniel Ramírez (on loan to Coras Tepic)
––	DF	(Mexico) MEX	Orlando Pineda (on loan to Atlético SL)
––	MF	(Mexico) MEX	Eduardo Gámez (on loan to Lobos BUAP)

=== Veracruz ===
In: Note: Flags indicate national team as defined under FIFA eligibility rules; some limited exceptions apply. Players may hold more than one non-FIFA nationality.

No.	Pos.	Nation	Player
5	DF	(Mexico) MEX	Dárvin Chávez (on loan from Monterrey)
7	MF	(Mexico) MEX	Alan Zamora (on loan from Querétaro, previously on loan at Chiapas)
12	DF	(Mexico) MEX	Horacio Cervantes (on loan from Cruz Azul, previously on loan at Chiapas)
15	MF	(United States) USA	Joe Corona (on loan from Tijuana)
16	MF	(Mexico) MEX	César de la Peña (on loan from Monterrey, previously on loan at Atlético SL)
19	FW	(Mexico) MEX	Aníbal Zurdo (on loan from Cruz Azul, previously on loan at (Spain) Sabadell)
21	DF	(Mexico) MEX	Alejandro Berber (on loan from Monterrey, previously on loan at Dorados)
24	DF	(Argentina) ARG	Rodrigo Noya (from Venados, previously on loan)
28	DF	(Mexico) MEX	Jesús Paganoni (from Atlas, previously on loan)
33	GK	(Mexico) MEX	Sergio García (on loan from UANL, previously on loan at Chiapas)

Out: Note: Flags indicate national team as defined under FIFA eligibility rules; some limited exceptions apply. Players may hold more than one non-FIFA nationality.

No.	Pos.	Nation	Player
2	DF	(Mexico) MEX	Adrián Cortés (on loan to Puebla)
3	DF	(Colombia) COL	Leiton Jiménez (to Tijuana)
4	DF	(Mexico) MEX	Óscar Mascorro
5	MF	(Mexico) MEX	Jehu Chiapas (on loan to Chiapas)
7	MF	(Mexico) MEX	Emmanuel Gil (on loan to Puebla)
25	GK	(Mexico) MEX	Leonín Pineda (on loan to Atlético SL)
27	FW	(Mexico) MEX	Víctor Mañón (loan return to Pachuca)
31	FW	(Mexico) MEX	Michel Vázquez (loan return to Lobos BUAP)
––	MF	(Brazil) BRA	Wilson Tiago (on loan to Querétaro, previously on loan to Chiapas)

== See also ==
- 2015–16 Liga MX season
