= 2015–16 Puebla F.C. season =

Puebla F.C.
2015–16 season
- Chairman: Jesus Lopez Charagoy
- Manager: Pablo Marini
- Stadium: Estadio Cuauhtémoc
Home colours	Away colours	Third colours

The 2015–16 Puebla F.C. season was the club's 69th professional season in Mexico's top-flight football league. The season is split into two tournaments—the Torneo Apertura and the Torneo Clausura—each with identical formats and each contested by the same eighteen teams. The club also played Supercopa MX and Copa Libertadores.

== First-team squad ==
Note: Flags indicate national team as defined under FIFA eligibility rules; some limited exceptions apply. Players may hold more than one non-FIFA nationality.

No.	Pos.	Nation	Player
1	GK	MEX	Fabián Villaseñor (on loan from Morelia)
2	DF	URU	Robert Herrera
3	MF	MEX	Carlos Gutiérrez (on loan from América)
5	DF	MEX	Mario de Luna (on loan from Guadalajara)
8	MF	MEX	Luis Robles (on loan from Atlas)
9	FW	CHI	Isaác Díaz (on loan from Chiapas)
10	MF	MEX	Christian Bermúdez (on loan from Chiapas)
11	FW	ARG	Matías Alustiza
12	DF	MEX	Óscar Rojas
13	MF	MEX	Alfonso Tamay (on loan from UANL)
14	DF	MEX	Emilio Yamín
15	MF	MEX	Alfredo Juraidini
16	MF	MEX	David Toledo (on loan from Guadalajara)
17	GK	ARG	Cristian Campestrini

No.	Pos.	Nation	Player
18	FW	COL	Luis Gabriel Rey
19	MF	MEX	Flavio Santos (on loan from Atlas)
20	DF	MEX	Adrián Cortés (on loan from Veracruz)
21	DF	URU	Ramón Arias (on loan from Defensor Sporting)
22	MF	MEX	Patricio Araujo
23	DF	MEX	Emmanuel Gil (on loan from Veracruz)
24	DF	MEX	Sergio Pérez (on loan from Querétaro)
25	MF	MEX	Juan Pablo Fassi (on loan from Pachuca)
26	DF	MEX	Roberto Juárez
27	MF	MEX	Alberto Acosta (on loan from UANL)
28	MF	MEX	Francisco Torres (on loan from Santos Laguna)
29	FW	ARG	Ezequiel Rescaldani (on loan from Málaga)
30	GK	USA	Austin Guerrero

For recent transfers, see List of Mexican football transfers summer 2015.

== Supercopa MX ==
=== Match details ===
20 July 2015
17:30

Puebla	1–0	Morelia
Rey 68'	Report

Toyota Stadium, Frisco
Attendance: 8,000
Referee: Kevin Terry, Jr. (United States)

GK	17	(Argentina) Cristian Campestrini
DF	3	(Mexico) Carlos Alberto Gutiérrez
DF	5	(Mexico) Mario de Luna
DF	22	(Mexico) Patricio Araujo (c)
DF	12	(Mexico) Óscar Rojas
MF	28	(Mexico) Francisco Torres
MF	8	(Mexico) Luis Robles
MF	27	(Mexico) Alberto Acosta		(substituted off) 56'
MF	10	(Mexico) Christian Bermúdez		(substituted off) 79'
MF	19	(Mexico) Flavio Santos	(yellow card) 46'	(substituted off) 63'
FW	18	(Colombia) Luis Gabriel Rey
Substitutions:
GK	1	(Mexico) Fabián Villaseñor
DF	20	(Mexico) Adrián Cortés
DF	26	(Mexico) Roberto Juárez		(substituted on) 79'
MF	16	(Mexico) David Toledo		(substituted on) 63'
MF	29	(Argentina) Ezequiel Rescaldani
FW	9	(Chile) Isaac Díaz
FW	29	(Argentina) Matías Alustiza		(substituted on) 56'
Manager:
(Argentina) Pablo Marini

GK	13	(Mexico) Cirilo Saucedo
DF	17	(Mexico) Hibert Ruiz	(yellow card) 44'
DF	4	(Argentina) Marco Torsiglieri	(yellow card) 29'
DF	5	(Argentina) Facundo Erpen
DF	2	(Mexico) Enrique Pérez (c)
MF	16	(Mexico) Cristian Pellerano
MF	8	(Mexico) Juan Pablo Rodríguez	(yellow card) 88'
MF	24	(Mexico) Dieter Villalpando		(substituted off) 77'
FW	9	(Colombia) Yorleys Mena		(substituted off) 52'
FW	7	(Paraguay) Pablo Velázquez		(substituted off) 58'
FW	23	(Colombia) Jefferson Cuero
Substitutions:
GK	1	(Mexico) Carlos Felipe Rodríguez
DF	6	(Mexico) Joel Huiqui
DF	25	(Mexico) Carlos Calvo
MF	10	(Argentina) Mauro Cejas		(substituted on) 77'
MF	22	(Mexico) Armando Zamorano		(substituted on) 52'
MF	26	(Mexico) Christian Valdez
FW	11	(Mexico) Carlos Ochoa		(substituted on) 58'
Manager:
(Mexico) Enrique Meza

Assistant referees:
Adam Garner (United States)
Jonathan Johnson (United States)
Fourth official:
Luis Guardia (United States)

Puebla won its first Supercopa MX and the third overall edition .

== Regular season ==
Win Draw Loss

=== Apertura 2015 results ===
July 26, 2015 Round 1	Puebla F.C.	4–2	Club América	Puebla City, Puebla
17:00	Araujo (yellow card) 17'; Torres 24'; Bermúdez 27'; Alustiza 41'; Santos 51'; Rey (yellow card) 65'; Campestrini (yellow card) 68'	Summary	Andrade 4'; Gil Burón (yellow card) 20'; Quintero 65'; Mares (yellow card) 73'	Stadium: Estadio Universitario BUAP; Referee: (Mexico) Luis Enrique Santander

August 9, 2015 Round 3	Puebla F.C.	3–2	Pumas UNAM	Puebla City, Puebla
17:00	Campestrini (yellow card) 41'; Santos 45+2'; Rey (yellow card) 53' (goal) 62'; Bermúdez 82'	Summary	Martínez 36'; Herrera (yellow card) 41'; Sosa (yellow card) 49'; Britos 53' (yellow card) 69'	Stadium: Estadio Universitario BUAP; Referee: (Mexico) Francisco Chacón

August 12, 2015 Round 4	Puebla F.C.	1–0	Toluca F.C	Puebla City, Puebla
17:00	Araujo (yellow card) 18'; Bermúdez 31'; Herrera (yellow card) 78'; Torres (yellow card) 90+2'	Summary	Gamboa (yellow card) 48'; Velasco (yellow card) 57'	Stadium: Estadio Universitario BUAP; Referee: (Mexico) Francisco Chacón

August 15, 2015 Round 5	Club Atlas	2–1	Puebla F.C.	Guadalajara, Jalisco
20:30	Loboa 11'; Medina 24' (pen.); Fraga (yellow card) 30'; Salinas (yellow card) 36'	Summary	Araujo (yellow card) 76'; Alustiza 86' (pen.)	Stadium: Estadio Jalisco; Referee: (Mexico) Fernando Guerrero Ramírez

August 23, 2015 Round 6	Puebla F.C.	3–2	C.F. Pachuca	Puebla City, Puebla
17:00				Stadium: Estadio Universitario BUAP

29 August 2015 Round 7	Dorados	1–0	Puebla F.C.	Culiacán, Sinaloa
20:00				Stadium: Estadio Banorte

September 13, 2015 Round 8	Puebla F.C.	0–1	Santos Laguna	Puebla City, Puebla
17:00				Stadium: Estadio Universitario BUAP

September 18, 2015 Round 9	C.D Veracruz	2–1	Puebla F.C.	Veracruz, Veracruz
19:30				Stadium: Estadio Luis "Pirata" Fuente

September 27, 2015 Round 10	Puebla F.C.	1–0	Cruz Azul	Puebla City, Puebla
17:00				Stadium: Estadio Universitario BUAP

September 30, 2015 Round 11	Tigres UANL	0–1	Puebla F.C.	San Nicolás de los Garza, Nuevo León
00:00				Stadium: Estadio Universitario

October 4, 2015 Round 12	Puebla F.C.	1–3	C.A Morelia	Puebla City, Puebla
17:00				Stadium: Estadio Universitario BUAP

10 October 2015 Round 2	Monterrey	1–1	Puebla F.C.	Monterrey, Nuevo León
19:00				Stadium: Estadio BBVA Bancomer

October 18, 2015 Round 13	C.D. Guadalajara	1–1	Puebla F.C.	Zapopan, Jalisco
17:00				Stadium: Estadio Omnilife

October 25, 2015 Round 14	Puebla F.C.	1–0	Club León	Puebla City, Puebla
17:00				Stadium: Estadio Universitario BUAP

October 21, 2015 Round 15	Chiapas F.C.	1–0	Puebla F.C.	Tuxtla Gutiérrez, Chiapas
21:00				Stadium: Estadio Víctor Manuel Reyna

November 8, 2015 Round 16	Puebla F.C.	2–1	Club Tijuana	Puebla City, Puebla
17:00				Stadium: Estadio Universitario BUAP

November 20, 2015 Round 17	Querétaro F.C.	0–0	Puebla F.C.	Santiago de Querétaro, Querétaro
19:00				Stadium: Estadio Corregidora

November 26, 2015 Quarterfinals	Puebla F.C.	2- 2	Toluca F.C	Puebla City, Puebla
19:00				Stadium: Estadio Cuauhtémoc

November 29, 2015 Quarterfinals	Toluca F.C	1–0	Puebla F.C.	Toluca, State of Mexico
				Stadium: Estadio Nemesio Díez

=== Goalscorers ===
Position	Nation	Name	Goals scored
1.	(Mexico) (Colombia)	Luis Gabriel Rey	9
2.	(Mexico)	Christian Bermúdez	5
3.	(Argentina) (Mexico)	Matías Alustiza	3
4.	(Mexico)	Flavio Santos	2
4.	(Mexico)	Francisco Javier Torres	2
4.	(Mexico)	Carlos Alberto Gutiérrez	2
5.	(Uruguay)	Robert Herrera	1

=== Results ===
==== Results summary ====
Overall								Home						Away					
Pld	W	D	L	GF	GA	GD	Pts	W	D	L	GF	GA	GD	W	D	L	GF	GA	GD
17	8	3	6	22	20	+2	27	7	0	2	17	12	+5	1	3	4	5	8	−3

Last updated: 29 June 2015.
Source: Apertura 2015 results

== Apertura 2015 Copa MX ==
=== Group stage ===
Win Draw Loss

==== Apertura results ====
July 30, 2015 1	Club Celaya	0–0	Puebla	Celaya, Guanajuato
19:00	0		0	Stadium: Estadio Miguel Aleman

August 4, 2015 2	Puebla	2–0	Club Celaya	Puebla, Puebla
19:00	2		0	Stadium: Estadio Universitario BUAP

August 18, 2015 3	Puebla	0– 5	Lobos BUAP	Puebla, Puebla
19:00				Stadium: Estadio Universitario BUAP

August 25, 2015 4	Lobos BUAP	1–0	Puebla	Puebla, Puebla
21:00				Stadium: Estadio Universitario BUAP

September 16, 2014 5	C.D Veracruz	0–0	Puebla	Veracruz, Veracruz
19:00				Stadium: Estadio Luis "Pirata" Fuente

September 23, 2015 6	Puebla	0–0	C.D Veracruz	Puebla, Puebla
19:00				Stadium: Estadio Universitario BUAP

=== Goalscorers ===
Position	Nation	Name	Goals scored
1.	(Argentina)	Ezequiel Rescaldani	3

=== Results ===
==== Results by round ====
Round	1	2	3	4	5	6
Ground	A	H	A	H	A	H
Result	D	W	L	W	D	D
Position	3	1	3	3	2	2

Updated to match(es) played on 9 June 2015. Source: Apertura results and mediotiempo.com
A = Away; H = Home; W = Win; D = Draw; L = Loss

== 2016 ==
=== Regular season ===
Win Draw Loss

=== Clausura 2016 results ===
January 9, 2016 Round 1	Club América	0–0	Puebla F.C.	Mexico City
17:00				Stadium: Estadio Azteca

January 17, 2016 Round 2	Puebla F.C.	1–3	Monterrey	Puebla City, Puebla
17:00				Stadium: Estadio Cuauhtémoc

January 24, 2015 Round 3	Pumas UNAM	0–1	Puebla F.C.	Mexico City, Mexico
12:00				Stadium: Estadio Olímpico Universitario

January 31, 2016 Round 4	Toluca F.C	1–1	Puebla F.C.	Toluca, Mexico, Mexico
12:00				Stadium: Nemesio Díez

February 7, 2016 Round 5	Puebla F.C.	4–1	Club Atlas	Puebla City, Puebla
17:00				Stadium: Estadio Cuauhtémoc

February 13, 2016 Round 6	C.F. Pachuca	5–2	Puebla F.C.	Pachuca, Hidalgo, Mexico
20:00				Stadium: Estadio Hidalgo

21 August 2016 Round 7	Puebla F.C.	3–2	Dorados	Puebla City, Puebla
17:00				Stadium: Estadio Cuauhtémoc

February 27, 2016 Round 8	Santos Laguna	1–1	Puebla F.C.	Torreón, Coahuila, Mexico
17:00				Stadium: Estadio Corona

March 6, 2016 Round 9	Puebla F.C.	1–1	C.D Veracruz	Puebla City, Puebla
12:00				Stadium: Estadio Cuauhtémoc

March 12, 2016 Round 10	Cruz Azul	1–1	Puebla F.C.	Mexico City
17:00				Stadium: Estadio Azteca

March 20, 2015 Round 11	Puebla F.C.	0–0	Tigres UANL	Puebla City, Puebla
17:00				Stadium: Estadio Cuauhtémoc

April 2, 2016 Round 12	C.A Morelia	2–0	Puebla F.C.	Morelia, Michoacán
20:30				Stadium: Estadio Morelos

April 10, 2016 Round 13	Puebla F.C.	3–0	C.D. Guadalajara	Puebla City, Puebla
17:00				Stadium: Estadio Cuauhtémoc

April 16, 2016 Round 14	Club León	4–1	Puebla F.C.	León, Guanajuato, Mexico
20:00				Stadium: Estadio Nou Camp

April 24, 2016 Round 15	Puebla F.C.	2–1	Chiapas F.C.	Puebla City, Puebla
21:00				Stadium: Estadio Cuauhtémoc

April 30, 2016 Round 16	Club Tijuana	0–0	Puebla F.C.	Tijuana, Baja California, Mexico
17:00				Stadium: Estadio Caliente

May 8, 2016 Round 17	Querétaro F.C.	3–1	Puebla F.C.	Puebla City, Puebla
17:00				Stadium: Estadio Cuauhtémoc

=== Attendance ===
Puebla's Home Attendance by round, Estadio Cuahutemoc has a sitting capacity of 51,726 . |}

round	Team	Attendance	Percentage
2	Monterrey	32,125	63.30 %
5	Club Atlas	42,554	83.84 %
7	Dorados de Sinaloa	42,701	84.13 %
9	Tiburones Rojos de Veracruz	39,443	77.71 %
11	Tigres UANL	43,516	85.74 %
13	C.D. Guadalajara	45,527	89.70 %
15	Chiapas F.C.	20,744	40.87 %
17	Querétaro F.C.	-	-

=== Goalscorers ===
Position	Nation	Name	Goals scored
1.	(Argentina) (Mexico)	Matías Alustiza	7
2.	(Uruguay)	Álvaro Navarro	2
2.	(Mexico)	Christian Valdez	2
2.	(Mexico)	Christian Bermúdez	2
3.	(Mexico)	Alberto Acosta	1
3.	(Mexico)	Patricio Araujo	1
3.	(Argentina)	Damián Escudero	1
3.	(Mexico)	Eduardo Pérez	1

=== Results ===
==== Results summary ====
Overall								Home						Away					
Pld	W	D	L	GF	GA	GD	Pts	W	D	L	GF	GA	GD	W	D	L	GF	GA	GD
17	5	7	5	19	23	−4	22	4	3	2	14	11	+3	1	4	3	5	12	−7

Last updated: 29 June 2015.
Source: Clausura 2016 results

=== Pre Libertadores 2016 ===
After Santos laguna reached the Clausura 2015 final, Puebla earned a passed to the Copa Libertadores 2016 due to Santos pass to the 2016 Concachampions Cup. On December 22, 2015, the Conmebol will have the lottery in Paraguay in order to define Puebla's rival. Due to fellow Mexican club Tigres who is the 2015 Runner up, Puebla won the right to home advantage in the series that will award 1st stage participation .

Win Draw Loss

February 3, 2016 Qualifier Home	Puebla F.C.	2–2	Racing Club	Puebla City, Puebla
				Stadium: Estadio Cuauhtémoc

February 10, 2016
Qualifier Away

Racing Club	1–0	Puebla F.C.

El Cilindro, Avellaneda

== Relegation 2015 – 2016 ==
Pos	Team	'13 A Pts	'14 C Pts	'14 A Pts	'15 C Pts	'15 A Pts	'16 C Pts	Total Pts	Total Pld	Avg	Relegation
13	Tijuana	21	24	21	24	16	0	106	85	1.2471	
14	Veracruz	20	16	15	28	27	0	105	85	1.2353	
15	Puebla	19	18	16	20	27	0	100	85	1.1765	
16	Guadalajara	12	21	16	26	21	0	96	85	1.1294	
17	Morelia	27	21	10	13	23	0	94	85	1.1059	
18	Sinaloa	0	0	0	0	15	0	15	17	0.8824	Relegation to Ascenso MX

Last update: 21 November 2015

Secure for 2016–17 Season.
Relegation Zone.
Relegation to Ascenso MX.
