= Héctor Acevedo =

Mexican footballer (born 1992)

Personal information
- Full name: Héctor Eduardo Acevedo García
- Date of birth: 16 March 1992 (age 34)
- Place of birth: Durango City, Durango
- Height: 1.71 m (5 ft 7 in)
- Position: Midfielder

Youth career
- 2007-2012: Cruz Azul

Senior career*
Years	Team	Apps	(Gls)
2012	Cruz Azul	0	(0)
2012-2016	Cruz Azul Hidalgo	82	(13)
2016-2018	Alacranes de Durango	45	(3)
2020-2021	Acaxees de Durango		

International career
2022–	Mexico (beach)	0	(0)
- * Club domestic league appearances and goals

Héctor Eduardo Acevedo García (Note: In this Spanish name, the first or paternal surname is Acevedo and the second or maternal family name is García.) (born 16 March 1992) is a Mexican former professional footballer who last played for Alacranes de Durango. He played with Acaxees de Durango of the Liga de Balompié Mexicano during the league's inaugural season in 2020–21.
