= Oliver Ortíz =

Mexican footballer (born 1993)

Personal information
- Full name: Oliver Ortíz Sandoval
- Date of birth: 21 January 1993 (age 33)
- Place of birth: San Quintin, Baja California, Mexico
- Height: 1.88 m (6 ft 2 in)
- Position: Defender

Youth career
- 2009–2013: Tijuana

Senior career*
Years	Team	Apps	(Gls)
2013–2015	Tijuana	16	(0)
2013–2014	→ Dorados de Sinaloa (loan)	2	(0)
2015	→ Necaxa (loan)	0	(0)
2016	→ U. de G. (loan)	17	(0)
2016–2018	Dorados de Sinaloa	56	(1)
2018–2019	→ Cafetaleros de Tapachula (loan)	21	(0)
2019–2020	Correcaminos UAT	8	(0)
2020	Los Cabos	0	(0)
- * Club domestic league appearances and goals as of 00:22, 24 January 2020 (UTC)

Oliver Ortíz Sandoval (born 21 January 1993) is a Mexican professional footballer who plays for Correcaminos UAT of Ascenso MX on loan from Tijuana.

He played with Los Cabos of the Liga de Balompié Mexicano during the league's inaugural season in 2020–21.
