= 2020–21 Liga de Balompié Mexicano season =

Liga de Balompié Mexicano
- Season: 2020–21
- Dates: 14 October 2020 – 31 January 2021
- Champions: Chapulineros de Oaxaca (1st title)
- Matches: 79
- Goals: 175 (2.22 per match)
- Biggest home win: Oaxaca 7–0 Leones Dorados (14 November 2020); Jaguares de Jalisco 7–0 Acaxees de Durango (15 November 2020)
- Biggest away win: Leones Dorados 0–4 Jaguares de Jalisco (8 November 2020)
- Highest scoring: Oaxaca 7–0 Leones Dorados (14 November 2020); Jaguares de Jalisco 7–0 Acaxees de Durango (15 November 2020)
- Stats are from the regular season only

The 2020–21 Liga de Balompié Mexicano season was the 1st professional season of the most important league of competitions organized by the Asociación Nacional del Balompié Mexicano, a Mexican football federation affiliated with CONIFA. The season began on 14 October 2020 and finished on 31 January 2021. Chapulineros de Oaxaca was the champion.

== Teams ==
=== Stadiums and locations ===
Liga de Balompié Mexicano Official Teams

Teams	City	Stadium	Capacity
Atlético Veracruz	Veracruz, Veracruz	Luis "Pirata" Fuente	28,703
Chapulineros de Oaxaca	San Jerónimo Tlacochahuaya, Oaxaca	Independiente MRCI	3,000
Furia Roja	Jesús María, Jalisco	Ramírez Nogales	1,500
Industriales Naucalpan	Naucalpan de Juárez, México	José Ortega Martínez	3,700
Jaguares de Jalisco	Tala, Jalisco	Centro Deportivo y Cultural 24 de Marzo	3,000
Leones Dorados	Teziutlán, Puebla	Municipal de Teziutlán	7,000
Morelos	Xochitepec, Morelos	Mariano Matamoros	16,000
Neza	Nezahualcóyotl, México	Neza 86	20,000

=== Personnel and kits ===
Team	Chairman	Head coach	Kit manufacturer	Shirt sponsor(s)
Atlético Veracruz	(Mexico) Ana María Macías	(Mexico) Lucas Ayala	Keuka	Interjet
Chapulineros de Oaxaca	(Mexico) José María Ramírez	(Mexico) Omar Arellano	Keuka	MRCI
Furia Roja	TBA	(Mexico) Andrés González	Keuka	Casa Don Ramón
Industriales Naucalpan	(Mexico) Leonardo Ramos Mateos	(Mexico) Ricardo Carbajal	Keuka	TBA
Jaguares de Jalisco	(Mexico) Roberto Báez	(Mexico) Juan Pablo García	Keuka	TBA
Leones Dorados	(Mexico) Octavio Mozo	(Mexico) Antulio Padilla	Keuka	TBA
Morelos	(Mexico) Mauricio Ruiz	(Mexico) Carlos Reinoso Jr.	Keuka	TBA
Neza	(Mexico) Hugo Vázquez	(Mexico) José Julio César Huerta	Keuka	TBA

==== Disaffiliated teams ====
Club	City	Stadium	Capacity
Acapulco (Note: The team started the season, however, on November 17, 2020, the team was disaffiliated by the LBM due to debts.)	Acapulco, Guerrero	Unidad Deportiva Acapulco	13,000
Jalisco (Note: The team started the season as Atlético Jalisco, however, on October 30, 2020, the LBM took control of the club due to salary payment problems, the league looked for new owners so that the club could continue with another identity, however, a new administration was not obtained. On November 9, 2020, Atlético Jalisco was dissolved by the LBM.)	Guadalajara, Jalisco	Tres de Marzo	18,779
Zacatepec (Note: The team started the season, however, on November 10, 2020, the team was disaffiliated by the LBM due to debts.)	Zacatepec, Morelos	Agustín "Coruco" Díaz	24,313

==== On hiatus teams ====
On December 1, 2020, four franchises were placed on hiatus due to financial or administrative problems: Acaxees de Durango, Los Cabos, San José and Veracruzano Tiburón. These four clubs can rejoin in the following season as long as they manage to improve their financial situation.

On January 4, 2021, Atlético Capitalino abandoned the season due to problems derived from the COVID-19 pandemic that affect Mexico City.

Club	City	Stadium	Capacity
Acaxees de Durango	Durango, Durango	Francisco Zarco	18,000
Atlético Capitalino	Mexico City	Jesús Martínez "Palillo"	6,000
Los Cabos	Los Cabos, Baja California Sur	Yenekamú	7,000
San José	Yautepec, Morelos	Centro Deportivo Yautepec	3,000
Club Veracruzano de Fútbol Tiburón	Tlapacoyan, Veracruz	Los Héroes	5,000

==== Retired teams ====
On December 30, 2020, Halcones de Zapopan withdrew from the season due to financial problems, planning to come back next season as long as the league had adjustments in its structure and had better financial stability, however, on January 12, 2021 the team left the LBM due to lack of compliance with the league board and announced their goal of seeking to join another competition.

Club	City	Stadium	Capacity
Halcones de Zapopan	Zapopan, Jalisco	Tres de Marzo	18,779

== Regular season ==
=== Standings ===
Pos	Team	Pld	W	D	L	GF	GA	GD	Pts	Qualification or relegation
1	Furia Roja	10	7	2	1	20	6	+14	23	Semi-finals
2	Jaguares de Jalisco	10	7	3	0	23	3	+20	22	Triangular stage
3	Oaxaca (C)	10	7	2	1	23	4	+19	22	Triangular stage
4	Industriales Naucalpan	10	6	3	1	18	7	+11	21	Triangular stage
5	Morelos	10	5	1	4	17	10	+7	16	Triangular stage
6	Neza	8	4	3	1	15	10	+5	15	Triangular stage
7	Atlético Veracruz	7	3	3	1	15	13	+2	12	Triangular stage
8	Leones Dorados	9	4	0	5	12	22	−10	12	
9	Zapopan	8	5	3	0	17	7	+10	18	Done for the season
10	Atlético Capitalino	9	4	2	3	12	10	+2	13	Done for the season
11	San José	6	0	0	6	1	13	−12	0	Done for the season
12	CVF Tiburón	5	0	0	5	0	10	−10	0	Done for the season
13	Los Cabos	5	0	0	5	1	11	−10	0	Done for the season
14	Durango	6	0	0	6	0	17	−17	0	Done for the season
15	Acapulco	4	0	0	4	0	8	−8	0	Done for the season
16	Atlético Jalisco	4	0	0	4	1	9	−8	0	Done for the season
17	Zacatepec	6	0	0	6	0	12	−12	0	Done for the season

Updated to match(es) played on 5 January 2021. Source: BeSoccer
(C) Champions

=== Positions by Round ===
Semi-finals
Triangular stage
Triangular stage

Team ╲ Round	1	2	3	4	5	6	7	8	9
Furia Roja (Note: Team with two pendant matches since Week 5)	8	12	6	4	5	11	8	2	1
Jaguares	9	13	14	7	4	3	1	1	2
Oaxaca	10	8	2	1	1	1	2	3	3
Naucalpan (Note: Team with a pendant match since Week 7)	7	11†	13	9	11†	9	3	4	4
Zapopan	14	14	8	11†	10	5	5	5	5
Morelos (Note: Team with an extra match between Weeks 1 and 17) (Note: Team with two pendant matches since Week 3)	2	3	9	8	9	6	6	6	6
Neza (Note: Team with a pendant match since Week 6)	15	5	3	5	8†	8	7	7	7
Capitalino	5	7†	12	14	12	12	9	9	8
Veracruz (Note: Team with a pendant match since Week 6)	11†	10	5	3	3	10	4	8	9
Leones (Note: Team with two pendant matches since Week 7)	17	17	17	17	15	14	10	10	10

Updated to match(es) played on 5 January 2021. Source: BeSoccer
Notes: † indicates team rested that round

=== Results ===
Home \ Away	ACA (Note: Due to the disaffiliation of the club, all matches were awarded to the rival by a score of 0–2)	ACX	ATC	ATJ	ATV	CHA	FUR	HZP	IND	JAJ	LED	LOB	LOS	MOR	NEZ	SJO	VFT
Acapulco	—	—	—	—	—	0–2	—	0–2	—	—	0–2	—	—	—	—	—	—
Acaxees	—	—	—	—	—	0–2	—	—	—	—	—	—	—	0–2	—	—	—
Atlético Capitalino	2–0	—	—	—	—	1–0	—	—	1–4	—	—	—	2–0	1–2	—	—	2–0
Atlético Jalisco	—	—	—	—	—	—	—	—	—	0–2	—	—	—	—	—	—	—
Atlético Veracruz	—	—	—	—	—	—	—	3–3	—	2–0	—	—	3–1	—	—	—	2–0
Chapulineros	2–0	2–0	—	3–1	4–1	—	2–2	—	—	—	7–0	2–0	—	—	—	2–0	—
Furia Roja	—	—	—	2–0	—	—	—	—	—	0–2	5–0	2–0	—	—	3–1	2–0	2–0
Halcones Zapopan	2–0	—	2–1	—	—	—	—	—	1–1	—	—	2–0	2–0	2–0	—	—	—
Industriales Naucalpan	2–0	2–0	—	—	0–1	—	1–1	—	—	—	—	2–0	2–0	—	3–3	—	—
Jaguares Jalisco	—	7–0	0–0	2–0	2–2	0–0	—	—	—	—	—	2–0	—	—	—	2–0	—
Leones Dorados	—	2–0	—	2–0	—	—	—	—	—	0–4	—	—	—	—	0–1	2–0	2–0
Lobos Zacatepec	—	—	—	—	—	0–2	—	—	0–2	—	—	—	—	0–2	—	—	—
Los Cabos	—	—	0–2	—	—	—	—	—	—	—	—	—	—	—	—	—	—
Morelos	—	2–0	—	—	3–3	—	0–1	—	0–1	1–2	5–0	2–0	—	—	—	2–0	—
Neza	—	2–0	2–2	—	—	—	—	2–2	—	—	—	2–0	—	—	—	2–0	—
San José	—	—	—	—	—	1–3	—	—	—	—	0–2	—	—	0–2	—	—	—
CVF Tiburón	—	—	—	—	0–2	—	0–2	—	—	—	0–2	—	—	—	—	—	—

Updated to match(es) played on 16 December 2020. Source: BeSoccer
Legend: Blue = home team win; Yellow = draw; Red = away team win.

=== Liguilla ===
On January 5, 2021, the LBM announced the end of the regular season due to the small number of teams that continued to participate. It was determined that the best team of the season would qualify directly to the semifinals, while the teams placed between second and seventh place will have to play a so-called triangular preliminary round. The triangular and semifinal phases will be played as a single game, while the final will be played in two games.

==== Triangular ====
Team 1	Score	Team 2
Chapulineros de Oaxaca	1–0	Morelos
Jaguares de Jalisco	0–3	(awd.) Atlético Veracruz
Industriales Naucalpan	3–1	Neza

16 January 2021	Chapulineros de Oaxaca	1–0	Morelos	San Jerónimo Tlacochahuaya
16:00	Hernández 42'	Report		Stadium: Estadio Independiente MRCI; Attendance: 0

17 January 2021	Jaguares de Jalisco	0–3 (Note: Atlético Veracruz refused to play the game because the match field did not comply with the sanitary measures required due to the COVID-19 pandemic. On January 19, 2021 the LBM awarded the game to Atlético Veracruz as a punishment to Jaguares de Jalisco for not complying with the stadium regulations.)	Atlético Veracruz	Zapopan
12:00		Report		Stadium: Rancho Los Adobes; Attendance: 0

17 January 2021	Industriales Naucalpan	3–1	Neza	Naucalpan
12:00	Loroña 49'; 60' (own); Marín 86'	Report	45'}	Stadium: Unknown Stadium; Attendance: 0

==== Final stage ====
Semi-finals
1	Furia Roja	1
3	Chapulineros de Oaxaca	3
7	Atlético Veracruz	2
4	Industriales Naucalpan	0

Final
3	Chapulineros de Oaxaca (p)	0	3	3 (4)
7	Atlético Veracruz	2	1	3 (2)

===== Semi-finals =====
Team 1	Score	Team 2
Furia Roja	1–3	Chapulineros de Oaxaca
Atlético Veracruz	2–0	Industriales Naucalpan

24 January 2021	Atlético Veracruz	2–0	Industriales Naucalpan	Córdoba
12:00	López 23'; Bermúdez 36'	Report		Stadium: Estadio Rafael Murillo Vidal; Attendance: 0

24 January 2021	Furia Roja	1–3	Chapulineros de Oaxaca	Jesús María
15:00	Pájaro 64'	Report	Lojero 10'; Maya 54'; Santillán 60'	Stadium: Estadio Ramírez Nogales; Attendance: 0

===== Final =====
Team 1	Agg.	Team 2	1st leg	2nd leg
Chapulineros de Oaxaca (pen.)	3–3 (4–2)	Atlético Veracruz	0–2	3–1

====== First leg ======
28 January 2021	Atlético Veracruz	2–0	Chapulineros de Oaxaca	Córdoba
13:00	Araiza 84'; TBA 90' (own)	Report		Stadium: Estadio Rafael Murillo Vidal

====== Second leg ======
31 January 2021	Chapulineros de Oaxaca	3–1 (3–3 agg.) (4–2 p)	Atlético Veracruz	San Jerónimo Tlacochahuaya
15:45	Lojero 12'; Arellano 32', 79'	Report	Esquivel 89'	Stadium: Estadio Independiente MRCI; Attendance: 0 Referee: Roberto Ríos Jácome
	Penalties
	Omar Arellano (penalty scored); Martínez (penalty scored); García (penalty scored); Estala (penalty scored)		Espericueta (penalty scored); Preciado (penalty scored)

2020–21 winners

1st title

=== Regular season statistics ===
==== Top goalscorers ====
Players sorted first by goals scored, then by last name.

Rank	Player	Club	Goals
1	(Mexico) Julio César Atilano	San José	4
1	(Mexico) Omar Rosas	San José	4
3	(Mexico) Carlos Peña	CVF Tiburón	3
3	(Mexico) César Vallejo	Jaguares de Jalisco	3
5	(Mexico) Jahir Barraza	Jalisco	2
5	(Mexico) Alejandro Castillo	Acapulco	2
5	(Mexico) Víctor Lojero	Chapulineros de Oaxaca	2
5	(Mexico) Luis Menes	Morelos	2
5	(Mexico) Alfonso Nieto	Neza	2
5	(Mexico) Aldair dos Santos	Morelos	2

== See also ==
- Liga de Balompié Mexicano
