= Julio Atilano =

Mexican footballer (born 1988)

Personal information
- Full name: Julio César Atilano Hernández
- Date of birth: 23 February 1988 (age 38)
- Place of birth: Leon, Guanajuato, Mexico
- Height: 1.73 m (5 ft 8 in)
- Position: Forward

Youth career
- 2006–2007: Monarcas Morelia

Senior career*
Years	Team	Apps	(Gls)
2007–2014	Monarcas Morelia	0	(0)
2007	→ Mérida (loan)	0	(0)
2008	→ Unión de Curtidores (loan)	14	(6)
2008–2010	→ Reboceros de La Piedad (loan)	2	(1)
2010	→ Potros Chetumal (loan)	18	(3)
2011	→ Atlante UTN (loan)	16	(2)
2011–2012	→ Toros Neza (loan)	37	(3)
2013	→ Pumas Morelos (loan)	12	(2)
2013	→ Delfines F.C. (loan)	8	(0)
2014	→ Mérida (loan)	5	(1)
2014–2015	Irapuato	9	(0)
2016–2020	Correcaminos UAT	37	(7)
2020	San José	0	(0)
2020	Halcones de Zapopan	0	(0)
- * Club domestic league appearances and goals

Julio César Atilano Hernández (Note: In this Spanish name, the first or paternal surname is Atilano and the second or maternal family name is Hernández.) (born 23 February 1988) is a former professional Mexican footballer who last played for Correcaminos UAT.

He played with San José F.C. of the Liga de Balompié Mexicano during the league's inaugural season.
