= Carlos Velázquez (footballer) =

Mexican footballer (born 1984)

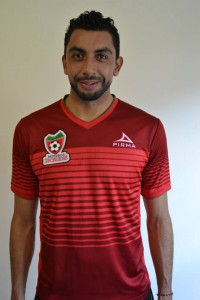
- Velázquez with Mineros de Zacatecas in 2014

Personal information
- Full name: Carlos Fernando Velázquez Castillo
- Date of birth: 2 June 1984 (age 42)
- Place of birth: Ciudad Sahagún, Hidalgo, Mexico
- Height: 1.86 m (6 ft 1 in)
- Position: Goalkeeper

Senior career*
Years	Team	Apps	(Gls)
2005	Pachuca Juniors	1	(0)
2006–2013	Pachuca	12	(0)
2006	→ Juárez (loan)	19	(0)
2007–2008	→ Tapachula (loan)	13	(0)
2008	→ Chiapas (loan)	1	(0)
2011	→ León (loan)	1	(0)
2013	→ Estudiantes (loan)	24	(0)
2014–2017	Mineros de Zacatecas	71	(0)
2016–2017	→ Everton (loan)	1	(0)
2017–2018	Correcaminos UAT	32	(0)
2018–2019	Alebrijes de Oaxaca	29	(0)
2019–2020	Cafetaleros de Chiapas	21	(0)
2020	Los Cabos FC	–	(–)
Total		225	(0)
- * Club domestic league appearances and goals

Carlos Fernando Velázquez Castillo (Note: In this Spanish name, the first or paternal surname is Velázquez and the second or maternal family name is Castillo.) (born 2 June 1984) is a former Mexican goalkeeper.

Velázquez made his debut on 29 April 2006 during a 3–2 loss to Cruz Azul in the Clausura 2006 tournament. He later re-appeared, playing for Chiapas on 19 January 2008 during a 2–2 tie against Atlante F.C.

He played with Los Cabos of the Liga de Balompié Mexicano during the league's inaugural season in 2020–21.
