= Pedro Esquivel =

Mexican footballer (born 1993)

Personal information
- Full name: Pedro Francisco Esquivel Montoya
- Date of birth: 3 August 1993 (age 33)
- Place of birth: Aguascalientes City, Aguascalientes, Mexico
- Height: 1.75 m (5 ft 9 in)
- Position: Midfielder

Youth career
- 2010: Guadalajara
- 2012–2013: América

Senior career*
| Years | Team | Apps | (Gls) |
| 2013 | América | 1 | (0) |
| 2014 | Altamira | 9 | (0) |
| 2014–2015 | Toros Neza | 26 | (5) |
| 2015–2016 | Cimarrones | 28 | (3) |
| 2016–2017 | Real Cuautitlán | 27 | (2) |
| 2017–2019 | Necaxa | 56 | (6) |
| 2019–2020 | Gavilanes de Matamoros | 21 | (1) |
| 2021 | Atlético Veracruz | 0 | (0) |
- * Club domestic league appearances and goals as of 19 August 2019

Pedro Francisco Esquivel Montoya (born 3 August 1993) is a Mexican professional footballer. He played with Atlético Veracruz of the Liga de Balompié Mexicano during the league's inaugural season, leading them to a runners-up finish after losing to Chapulineros de Oaxaca in the finals.
