= Jonathan Espericueta =

Mexican footballer (born 1994)

Personal information
- Full name: Jorge Jonathan Espericueta Escamilla
- Date of birth: 9 August 1994 (age 32)
- Place of birth: Monterrey, Nuevo León, Mexico
- Height: 1.78 m (5 ft 10 in)
- Position: Midfielder

Youth career
- 2008–2012: Tigres UANL

Senior career*
| Years | Team | Apps | (Gls) |
| 2011–2019 | Tigres UANL | 4 | (0) |
| 2014 | → Villarreal B (loan) | 9 | (1) |
| 2017–2018 | → Atlético San Luis (loan) | 28 | (2) |
| 2018–2019 | → Puebla (loan) | 8 | (1) |
| 2020 | Atlético Veracruz | 0 | (0) |

International career
| 2011 | Mexico U17 | 7 | (2) |
| 2013–2014 | Mexico U20 | 13 | (2) |
Medal record
Representing Mexico
| First place | FIFA U-17 World Cup | 2011 Mexico |
| First place | CONCACAF U-20 Championship | 2013 Mexico |
- * Club domestic league appearances and goals as of 30 August 2020

Jorge Jonathan Espericueta Escamilla (born 9 August 1994) is a Mexican former professional footballer who played as a midfielder.

Jonathan Espericueta was part of the Mexican U17 team who won the 2011 FIFA U-17 World Cup hosted in Mexico. Espericueta was a vital part of the team, playing all 7 matches and scoring 2 goals in the tournament, One of the goals being a memorable olympic goal against Germany in the semifinal to equalize the score.

== Club career ==
=== Tigres UANL ===
Espericueta made his debut for Tigres UANL on 18 September 2012 against Real Estelí in the 2012–13 CONCACAF Champions League in which he came on as a 69th-minute substitute for Abraham Stringel and scored the equalizer for UANL in the 89th minute to help them to a 1–1 draw.

Espericueta never made a league debut with Tigres, however he did play 5 Copa MX matches with the team.

==== Villarreal B ====
On 31 January 2014 it was announced that Espericueta was loaned out to Villarreal B for 1 year.

Espericueta made his league debut 22 February 2014 against Espanyol B coming in as a substitute for Sergio Marcos González in the 60' minute of the game. Espericueta made his first goal for the team 26 April 2014 against CF Badalona. the game ended in a 1–0 win for Villarreal B.

==== Atlético San Luis ====
On 8 June 2017, he joined Liga Ascenso club Atlético San Luis on loan.

==== Puebla ====
On 6 June 2019, Espericueta joined Puebla on loan.

=== Atlético Veracruz ===
On 20 August 2020, Espericueta joined Atlético Veracruz of the Liga de Balompié Mexicano during the league's inaugural season, leading them to a runners-up finish after losing to Chapulineros de Oaxaca in the finals.

== International career ==
=== Mexico U17 ===
Espericueta was part of the Mexican team that participated in the 2011 FIFA U-17 World Cup. He was one of Mexico's most important players during the tournament and was awarded the Adidas Silver Ball as the tournament's second best player. Espericueta scored his first goal in the tournament against Congo in the group stage. In the semifinals, Espericueta scored the 2-2 equalizer against Germany. The goal was scored directly from a corner kick. Mexico would end up winning the tournament beating Uruguay in the final.

=== Mexico U20 ===
Espericueta was selected to play the 2013 CONCACAF U-20 Championship in which he made 3 appearances and managed to score one goal in the final against United States Mexico won the match 3-1 and were crowned champions of the tournament. He was part of the Mexican team that participated in the 2013 FIFA U-20 World Cup. Espericueta managed to appear in all 4 matches, and scored a free kick against Greece. Mexico were eliminated by Spain in the knockout stage. Espericueta also appeared in the 2013 and 2014 editions of the Toulon Tournament.

== Career statistics ==
=== Club ===
As of 30 January 2024

Appearances and goals by club, season and competition
| Club | Season | League | | | Cup | | Continental | | Total | |
| Club | Season | Division | Apps | Goals | Apps | Goals | Apps | Goals | Apps | Goals |
|---|---|---|---|---|---|---|---|---|---|---|
| Tigres UANL | 2012–13 | Liga MX | — | | 0 | 0 | 2 (Note: 2012–13 CONCACAF Champions League) | 1 | 2 | 1 |
| Tigres UANL | 2013–14 | Liga MX | — | | 5 | 0 | — | | 5 | 0 |
| Tigres UANL | 2014–15 | Liga MX | 1 | 0 | 0 | 0 | 1 (Note: 2015 Copa Libertadores) | 1 | 2 | 1 |
| Tigres UANL | 2015–16 | Liga MX | 2 | 0 | 0 | 0 | 2 (Note: 2015–16 CONCACAF Champions League) | 0 | 4 | 0 |
| Tigres UANL | 2016–17 | Liga MX | 1 | 0 | 0 | 0 | 3 (Note: Appearances in 2016-17 CONCACAF Champions League) | 2 | 4 | 2 |
| Tigres UANL | Total | | 4 | 0 | 5 | 0 | 8 | 4 | 17 | 4 |
| Villarreal B (loan) | 2013–14 | Segunda División B | 7 | 1 | — | | — | | 7 | 1 |
| Villarreal B (loan) | 2014–15 | Segunda División B | 2 | 0 | — | | — | | 2 | 0 |
| Villarreal B (loan) | Total | | 9 | 1 | — | | — | | 9 | 1 |
| Atlético San Luis | 2017–18 | Ascenso MX | 28 | 2 | 1 | 0 | — | | 29 | 2 |
| Puebla | 2018–19 | Liga MX | 8 | 1 | 9 | 1 | — | | 17 | 2 |
| Career total | | | 49 | 4 | 5 | 0 | 8 | 4 | 72 | 9 |

== Honours ==
Tigres UANL

- Liga MX: Apertura 2015; Apertura 2016

Mexico Youth

- FIFA U-17 World Cup: 2011
- Milk Cup: 2012
- CONCACAF U-20 Championship: 2013
- Central American and Caribbean Games: 2014
- Pan American Silver Medal: 2015

Individual

- FIFA U-17 World Cup Silver Ball: 2011
