= Alejandro Castillo (footballer) =

Mexican footballer (born 1987)

Personal information
- Full name: Alejandro Castillo Castillo
- Date of birth: July 15, 1987 (age 39)
- Place of birth: Mexico City, Mexico
- Height: 1.85 m (6 ft 1 in)
- Position: Forward

Senior career*
Years	Team	Apps	(Gls)
2007–2012	Necaxa	82	(11)
2011	→ Irapuato (loan)	12	(0)
2013	Veracruz	15	(5)
2013–2014	Atletico San Luis	23	(3)
2014–2015	Lobos BUAP	6	(0)
2020	Acapulco	0	(0)
2021	Real Tlamazolan	0	(0)
2022	Halcones de Querétaro	0	(0)
- * Club domestic league appearances and goals as of 16 June 2011

Alejandro Castillo Castillo (born 15 July 1987) is a Mexican footballer who plays for Acapulco F.C. in the Liga de Balompié Mexicano. He played during the league's inaugural season in 2020–21, taking part in the first game in the team's history.
