= Leonín Pineda =

Mexican footballer (born 1985)

Personal information
- Full name: Leonín Pineda Velázquez
- Date of birth: 30 November 1985 (age 40)
- Place of birth: Arcelia, Guerrero, Mexico
- Position: Goalkeeper

Team information
- Current team: América U-19 (goalkeeping coach)

Senior career*
Years	Team	Apps	(Gls)
2006–2011	América	0	(0)
2010–2011	→ Tijuana (loan)	12	(0)
2012–2013	La Piedad	35	(0)
2013–2015	Veracruz	3	(0)
2015–2016	Atl. San Luis	23	(0)
2016–2017	Potros UAEM	44	(0)
2018	Tampico Madero	0	(0)
2019	Potros UAEM	8	(0)
2020	Atlético Jalisco	0	(0)

Managerial career
- 2023–: América Reserves and Academy
- * Club domestic league appearances and goals as of 8 December 2017

Leonín Pineda Velázquez (born 30 November 1985) is a Mexican former footballer who played as a goalkeeper.

Leonín Pineda was the goalie that helped Club Tijuana reach the promotion to the Liga MX back in 2011 when they defeated Irapuato 2–1 on May 21, 2011.
