= Leones Dorados F.C. =

Mexican association football club

- Full name: Leones Dorados Fútbol Club
- Founded: 20 July 2020; 6 years ago
- Dissolved: 1 December 2020; 5 years ago
- Ground: Estadio Municipal de Teziutlán; Teziutlán, Puebla
- Capacity: 7,000
- Chairman: Octavio Tomás Mozo Nieves
- Manager: Antulio Padilla
- League: Liga de Balompié Mexicano
- 2020–21: 8th
Home colours	Away colours

Leones Dorados Fútbol Club was a Mexican professional football club based in Teziutlán, Puebla, that competed in the Liga de Balompié Mexicano.

== History ==
On July 20, 2020, the club was announced as the 17th founding franchise of the Liga de Balompié Mexicano, previously it had not appeared on the lists of teams interested in being part of the new league. In the beginning they had become the second team based in Mexico City.

After his official presentation, the team announced Florencio Martínez as its first manager. On July 29, the team signed Portuguese Luka Oliveira to reinforce their squad for the first tournament.

Due to the lack of support for the team in Mexico City, the club's board decided to look for a new venue where they could play their home games. Finally, an agreement was reached with the municipality of Teziutlán, Puebla, with which the Leones Dorados took over the Municipal Stadium of the town, which had been remodeled recently, the field was left without a club after the Zaragoza franchise, which had announced it as its headquarters, was not accepted into the LBM.

== Stadium ==
The Estadio Municipal de Teziutlán is situated in Teziutlán, Puebla, and was the ground of Leones Dorados F.C., which played in the Liga de Balompié Mexicano. It has the capacity to hold 7,000 spectators. In 2020, it underwent a renovation to adapt it to the requirements of the LBM, among the improvement works were installed dressing rooms, showers, cyclonic mesh and a new grandstand, in addition to installing a storm drainage system for the maintenance of the court.

Originally, the team had announced that it would play at the Estadio Jesús Martínez "Palillo", located in the Ciudad Deportiva Magdalena Mixhuca of Mexico City. This field has a capacity for 6,000 spectators.
