= Carlos Reinoso Jr. =

Mexican footballer and manager (born 1970)

Personal information
- Full name: Carlos Alfredo Reinoso Arriagada
- Date of birth: 8 July 1970 (age 56)
- Place of birth: Mexico City, Mexico
- Height: 1.78 m (5 ft 10 in)
- Position: Midfielder

Senior career*
Years	Team	Apps	(Gls)
1991–1992	Tigres UANL	7	(0)
1993–1997	Toros Neza	45	(2)
1997	Puebla	6	(0)

Managerial career
- 2003: León (Assistant)
- 2004–2005: San Luis (Assistant)
- 2006: UAG (Assistant)
- 2008: Tiburones Rojos de Coatzacoalcos (Assistant)
- 2009–2011: Albinegros de Orizaba (Assistant)
- 2011: América (Assistant)
- 2013: Reboceros de La Piedad (Assistant)
- 2013–2014: Tiburones Rojos de Veracruz (Assistant)
- 2014: Reynosa
- 2015–2016: Tiburones Rojos de Veracruz (Assistant)
- 2016: Albinegros de Orizaba
- 2017: Tiburones Rojos de Veracruz (Assistant)
- 2017–2019: Albinegros de Orizaba
- 2019: Correcaminos UAT (Assistant)
- 2020: Morelos
- 2021: Atlético Capitalino
- 2022: Sporting Canamy
- * Club domestic league appearances and goals

Carlos Alfredo Reinoso Arriagada (born July 8, 1970) is a Mexican football manager and former player.

== Personal life ==
He is the son of the former Chile international footballer of the same name Carlos Reinoso.
