= Heriberto Aguayo =

Mexican footballer (born 1991)

Personal information
- Full name: Heriberto Aguayo Muñoz
- Date of birth: 24 July 1991 (age 35)
- Place of birth: Zapopan, Jalisco, Mexico
- Height: 1.84 m (6 ft 0 in)
- Position: Centre-back

Team information
- Current team: Tepatitlán
- Number: 3

Youth career
- Tecos

Senior career*
Years	Team	Apps	(Gls)
2012–2014	Tecos	49	(3)
2014–2019	Zacatecas	80	(3)
2014–2015	→ Pachuca (loan)	4	(0)
2015–2016	→ Dorados (loan)	3	(0)
2019–2020	Cafetaleros	19	(0)
2020	Atlético Jalisco	0	(0)
2021–2023	Cancún	47	(1)
2024–	Tepatitlán	0	(0)
- * Club domestic league appearances and goals as of 21 October 2022

Heriberto Aguayo Muñoz (born 24 July 1991) is a Mexican professional footballer who plays as a centre-back for Tepatitlán.
