= Omar Rosas =

Mexican footballer (born 1993)

Personal information
- Full name: Omar Arnulfo Rosas Salomón
- Date of birth: 6 August 1993 (age 33)
- Place of birth: Culiacán, Mexico
- Height: 1.86 m (6 ft 1 in)
- Position: Forward

Senior career*
Years	Team	Apps	(Gls)
2013	Orizaba II		
2013–2018	Veracruz	1	(0)
2015	→ Orizaba (loan)		
2016	→ Chapulineros (loan)		
2016	→ Soledad (loan)		
2017	→ AEM (loan)		
2017	→ Cruz Azul Hidalgo (loan)		
2021–2022	Real España	51	(12)
2022	FAS	1	(2)
2022	Morelia	1	(0)
2023	Platense	11	(2)
2024–2025	UAT	17	(4)
- * Club domestic league appearances and goals as of 11 April 2025

Omar Arnulfo Rosas Salomón (born 6 August 1993) is a Mexican professional footballer who plays as a forward.

Rosas broke into the Tiburones Rojos de Veracruz first team in 2014, playing in Liga MX and Copa MX matches.

On 14 October 2020 he scored the first goal in Liga de Balompié Mexicano history, an alternative football league sanctioned by the CONIFA, helping San José to a 1–0 victory over Morelos in the league's first-ever match.

He signed with Honduran club Real España in January 2021.
