= Raúl Coloma =

Chilean footballer (1928–2021)

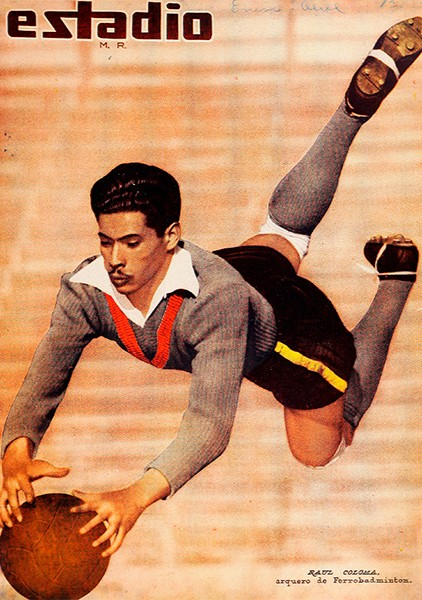
- Coloma on a magazine cover in 1951

Personal information
- Full name: Raúl Ernesto Coloma Rivas
- Date of birth: 9 July 1928
- Place of birth: Santiago, Chile
- Date of death: 12 October 2021 (aged 93)
- Place of death: Santiago, Chile
- Height: 1.79 m (5 ft 10 in)
- Position: Goalkeeper

Youth career
- Unión Española

Senior career*
Years	Team	Apps	(Gls)
1950–1964	Ferrobádminton		
1965–1967	Municipal de Santiago		
1971–1975	Ferroviarios		

International career
1959–1960	Chile	13	(0)
- * Club domestic league appearances and goals

Raúl Ernesto Coloma Rivas (9 July 1928 – 12 October 2021) was a Chilean footballer who played as a goalkeeper.

== Club career ==
In his early years, Coloma was with Unión Española, but he made his professional debut playing for Ferrobádminton, a resulting club from the fusion of Bádminton and Unión Ferroviarios, staying with them until 1964. After playing for Municipal de Santiago, he played at amateur level from 1968 to 1970 and then joined Ferroviarios in the Segunda División until 1975. In Chilean football, he held the record for playing professional football to highest age – 46 years old and 75 days – until 4 September 2026, when Cristian Campestrini broke it at the age of 46 years and 80 days playing for Rangers de Talca.

As a curiosity, he stated that the former Chilean goalkeeper Sergio Livingstone was his idol, replacing him in his farewell match against Argentina on 1959.

== International career ==
Coloma played in 13 matches for the Chile national team in 1959 and 1960. He was also part of Chile's squad for the 1959 South American Championship that took place in Argentina.

== Personal life ==
Both his brother, Julio, and his son, Luis, were professional footballers. When he played for Ferroviarios, he ran into Julio who was a goalkeeper too and faced Luis.
