= Ismael Valadéz =

Mexican footballer (born 1985)

Personal information
- Full name: Ismael Valadéz Arce
- Date of birth: 14 September 1985 (age 41)
- Place of birth: Tejupilco, Estado de México, Mexico
- Height: 1.75 m (5 ft 9 in)
- Position: Forward

Senior career*
Years	Team	Apps	(Gls)
2003–2008	Toluca	33	(3)
2008–2009	Atlante F.C.	10	(1)
2009–2010	León	31	(7)
2010–2011	Correcaminos	27	(5)
2011–2012	Altamira	15	(10)
2012	Dorados	8	(3)
2012–2014	Cruz Azul Hidalgo	22	(7)
2014–2015	Cruz Azul	17	(4)
2015–2016	→ Tapachula (loan)	34	(18)
2016–2020	Leones Negros UdeG	71	(31)
2020	Los Cabos	0	(0)

International career^{‡}
2006	Mexico U-23	3	(1)
2007	Mexico	2	(0)
- * Club domestic league appearances and goals as of 15 April 2018 ‡ National team caps and goals as of 17 October 2007

Ismael Valadéz Arce (born 14 September 1985) is a former Mexican football forward who last played for Los Cabos in the Liga de Balompié Mexicano.

He played with Los Cabos of the Liga de Balompié Mexicano during the league's inaugural season in 2020–21.
