= Moisés Velasco =

Mexican footballer (born 1989)

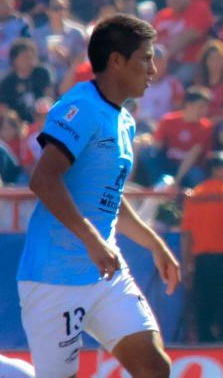
- Velasco in 2012

Personal information
- Full name: Moisés Adrián Velasco Herrera
- Date of birth: 19 October 1989 (age 37)
- Place of birth: Tijuana, Baja California, Mexico
- Height: 1.75 m (5 ft 9 in)
- Position: Midfielder

Youth career
- 2006: Atl. Mexiquense

Senior career*
Years	Team	Apps	(Gls)
2006–2016	Toluca	48	(0)
2011–2013	→ San Luis (loan)	48	(1)
2013	→ Chiapas (loan)	3	(0)
2014	→ Querétaro (loan)	5	(4)
2014–2015	→ América (loan)	11	(0)
2017	Sinaloa	33	(1)
2018	Correcaminos UAT	24	(0)
2019	Potros UAEM	12	(1)
2019–2020	Alebrijes de Oaxaca	15	(0)
2020	Atlético Veracruz	0	(0)
- * Club domestic league appearances and goals as of 30 August 2020

Moisés Adrián Velasco Herrera (Note: In this Spanish name, the first or paternal surname is Velasco and the second or maternal family name is Herrera.) (born 19 October 1989) is a Mexican former professional football midfielder who last played for Veracruz.

He played with Atlético Veracruz of the Liga de Balompié Mexicano during the league's inaugural season, leading them to a runners-up finish after losing to Chapulineros de Oaxaca in the finals.

== Honours ==
América

- Liga MX: Apertura 2014
- CONCACAF Champions League: 2014–15
