= Christian Bermúdez =

Mexican footballer (born 1987)

Personal information
- Full name: Christian de Jesús; Bermúdez Gutiérrez
- Date of birth: 26 April 1987 (age 39)
- Place of birth: Nezahualcóyotl, Mexico
- Height: 1.61 m (5 ft 3 in)
- Position: Midfielder

Team information
- Current team: Atlante
- Number: 18

Youth career
- 2002–2005: Atlante

Senior career*
| Years | Team | Apps | (Gls) |
| 2006 | Real de Colima | 1 | (0) |
| 2008 | Potros Chetumal | 1 | (0) |
| 2006–2011 | Atlante | 179 | (29) |
| 2011–2013 | América | 56 | (6) |
| 2014 | Querétaro | 16 | (1) |
| 2014–2017 | Chiapas | 30 | (1) |
| 2015–2016 | → Puebla (loan) | 46 | (10) |
| 2017–2020 | Tapachula | 81 | (15) |
| 2020 | Atlético Veracruz | 0 | (0) |
| 2021– | Atlante | 143 | (20) |

International career
| 2007 | Mexico U20 | 5 | (1) |
| 2008–2011 | Mexico | 4 | (0) |
- * Club domestic league appearances and goals as of 16 October 2026

Christian de Jesús Bermúdez Gutiérrez (born 26 April 1987), also known as El Hobbit, is a Mexican professional footballer who plays as a midfielder for Liga MX club Atlante.

== Club career ==
Bermúdez has had a previous stint with Atlante from 2006 to 2011. He can play as a forward and a midfielder. He is known as "The Hobbit" because of his short stature.

On 18 December 2013 Bermúdez was transferred to Querétaro FC.

On 4 June 2014 Bermudez was transferred to Chiapas during the Apertura 2014 Mexican draft.

He played with Atlético Veracruz of the Liga de Balompié Mexicano during the league's inaugural season, leading them to a runners-up finish after losing to Chapulineros de Oaxaca in the finals.

== International career ==
During the 2011 CONCACAF Gold Cup, Bermúdez, and four other members of the Mexico National Team, tested positive for the banned substance of Clenbuterol and were withdrawn from the team's tournament squad. However, all players were exonerated as FIFA determined that the accused had accidentally ingested the banned substance through contaminated meat that had been served during a pre-tournament training camp.

However, World Anti-Doping Agency appealed to the Court of Arbitration for Sport to request a ban. But on 12 October 2011 WADA withdrew this request after the full file was available for them.

== Career statistics ==
=== International ===
As of match played on 4 September 2011

| National team | Year | Apps | Goals |
|---|---|---|---|
| Mexico | 2008 | 1 | 0 |
| Mexico | 2011 | 3 | 0 |
| Total | | 4 | 0 |

== Honours ==
Atlante

- Mexican Primera División: Apertura 2007
- Liga de Expansión MX: Apertura 2021, Apertura 2022
- Campeón de Campeones: 2022
- CONCACAF Champions League: 2008–09

América

- Liga MX: Clausura 2013

Puebla

- Supercopa MX: 2015

Tapachula:

- Ascenso MX: Clausura 2018

Mexico

- CONCACAF Gold Cup: 2011
