= Morelos F.C. =

Mexican association football club

- Full name: Morelos Fútbol Club
- Nickname: Chinelos
- Founded: 29 July 2020; 6 years ago
- Ground: Estadio Mariano Matamoros; Xochitepec, Morelos, Mexico
- Capacity: 16,000
- Chairman: Mauricio Ruíz
- League: Liga de Balompié Mexicano
| Home colours | Away colours |

Morelos Fútbol Club is a Mexican professional football team based in Xochitepec, Morelos, Mexico currently playing in Liga de Balompié Mexicano.

== History ==
The team was founded on July 29, 2020, it was the nineteenth and last founding franchise of the Liga de Balompié Mexicano. The same day the signing of Éder Patiño was reported as the first player in the club's history. On August 11, the team unveiled its coaching staff, headed by Carlos Reinoso Jr. as manager.

On October 14, 2020, the club played its first official game, this match was the first in the LBM history, Morelos F.C. was defeated by San José F.C. by score of 1–0. Omar Rosas scored the first goal in the history of the club and the competition. Also, Donis Rodríguez, player of Morelos F.C. was the first expelled in the history of the league.

== Stadium ==
The Estadio Mariano Matamoros is a multi-use stadium in Xochitepec. It is currently used mostly for football matches and is the home stadium for Morelos F.C. of Liga de Balompié Mexicano. The stadium has a capacity of 16,000 people.

== Players ==
=== First-team squad ===
As of 13 October 2020
