= Lobos Zacatepec =

Mexican association football club

- Full name: Club Deportivo Lobos Zacatepec
- Founded: 7 August 2020; 5 years ago
- Dissolved: 10 November 2020; 4 years ago
- Ground: Estadio Agustín "Coruco" Díaz; Zacatepec, Morelos, Mexico
- Capacity: 24,313
- Owner: TBA
- Chairman: TBA
- League: Liga de Balompié Mexicano
Home colours	Away colours

Club Deportivo Lobos Zacatepec was a Mexican professional football team based in Zacatepec, Morelos that played in Liga de Balompié Mexicano.

== History ==
On June 26, 2020, the end of professional football was announced in Zacatepec, after the relocation of Atlético Zacatepec to Morelia, Michoacán, where it was renamed Atlético Morelia. Meanwhile, Guillermo Aguilar had started the procedures to return Lobos BUAP to football, but taking part of the Liga de Balompié Mexicano instead of the FMF, on June 27 the club's entry into the new league became official. The team signed Rodrigo Ruiz as its technical director and announced the arrival of its first players, some of them involved in the previous Lobos BUAP stage that included their promotion to the Primera División de México.

In August 2020, the Lobos BUAP return was canceled due to differences between the sports project board and the BUAP board. After this, the team was forced to look for a new headquarters a few days after the closing of the new league's registers, having Tepic, Nayarit and Zacatepec as its possible new cities. Finally, the government of Morelos agreed to use the Estadio Agustín "Coruco" Díaz for the team, this being its new stadium, however, the project was renamed Lobos Zacatepec, using the colors white and green as its distinctive, just like those that had previously used other clubs in the city.

On November 10, 2020, the team was disaffiliated by the LBM due to debts.

== Stadium ==
Estadio Agustín "Coruco" Díaz is a football stadium named in honour of a local player named Agustín "Coruco" Díaz. It has a capacity of 16,000 seats and is home to the team Lobos Zacatepec. This stadium is one of the oldest in Mexico and its origins can be traced back to 1948. It is located in Zacatepec, Morelos. The official opening of this stadium was in November 1954. This stadium is nicknamed the Selva Cañera ("Sugar Cane Jungle") because of the tropical weather that distinguish the municipality of Zacatepec.

== Players ==
=== First-team squad ===
As of 13 October 2020
