= Francisco Torres (Mexican footballer) =

Mexican footballer (born 1983)

Personal information
- Full name: Francisco Javier Torres Zamora
- Date of birth: 12 May 1983 (age 43)
- Place of birth: León, Guanajuato, Mexico
- Height: 1.71 m (5 ft 7 in)
- Position: Attacking midfielder

Senior career*
Years	Team	Apps	(Gls)
2002–2006	América	69	(5)
2006–2010	Santos Laguna	145	(7)
2011–2013	Chiapas	9	(0)
2011–2012	→ Atlas (loan)	32	(3)
2012–2013	→ Morelia (loan)	27	(1)
2014–2018	Puebla	117	(5)
2018–2019	BUAP	4	(0)
2020	Acaxees de Durango	0	(0)

International career^{‡}
2003	Mexico U-20	3	(0)
2008	Mexico	1	(0)
- * Club domestic league appearances and goals as of 02:07, 3 September 2018 (UTC) ‡ National team caps and goals as of 12 November 2008

Francisco Javier Torres Zamora (born 12 May 1983) is a Mexican former footballer who last played for Lobos BUAP of Liga MX.

Torres was born in León, Guanajuato. He made his debut against La Piedad, in a semifinal match in which he played three minutes. Torres got his first start against Pachuca in the first game of the Clausura 2003. In his third game as a professional soccer player, Torres scored a spectacular goal against Chivas which tied the game 1–1. The following season, Leo Beenhakker became the new coach of Club América and he relegated Torres. He did not play a single minute. Clausura 2004 was not much better as Torres only made 2 appearances for a total of 33 minutes.

Apertura 2004 brought a new hope for Torres. Leo Beenhakker had been sacked and Oscar Ruggeri became the new coach. Torres immediately began playing and scored the winning goal in the first game of the season against Dorados de Sinaloa. Torres appeared a total of 15 times but did not score again. Even though his playing time decreased during the Clausura 2005 season, he responded during the playoffs when teammate Óscar Rojas was unable to play. Torres scored an important goal in the semifinals against Cruz Azul and helped Club América win their 10th championship.

Prior to the Apertura 2006 season, Torres was traded to Santos Laguna in a deal that brought Argentinian goalscorer Vicente Matías Vuoso to América.
