= Club Veracruzano de Fútbol Tiburón =

Association football club in Mexico

- Full name: Club Veracruzano de Fútbol Tiburón
- Founded: 14 May 2020; 6 years ago
- Dissolved: 1 December 2020; 5 years ago
- Ground: Estadio Los Héroes; Tlapacoyan, Veracruz
- Capacity: 5,000
- Chairman: Vacant
- League: Liga de Balompié Mexicano
- 2020–21: Withdrew
| Home colours | Away colours | Third colours |

Club Veracruzano de Fútbol Tiburón was a Mexican professional football club based in Tlapacoyan, Veracruz that competed in the Liga de Balompié Mexicano.

== History ==
In December 2019, the Tiburones Rojos de Veracruz franchise was disaffiliated from the Liga MX, so initiatives began to emerge to occupy the space left by that club. In May 2020, the Liga de Balompié Mexicano confirmed its fifth founding franchise, named Club Veracruzano de Fútbol Tiburón. On the following day, Diego Bartolotta was named as club president. Finally, on June 14, 2020 Gustavo Matosas was appointed as the club sports president.

On July 11, 2020, Franco Arizala was announced as the first player in the team's history, however, he requested to remain playing until December at Alebrijes de Oaxaca, his team at that time. On August 13, the team announced the signing of Carlos Peña, who played for the Mexico national football team at the 2014 FIFA World Cup.

On September 24, 2020, the team presented its official kit, inspired by the Tiburones Rojos de Veracruz franchise, a team to which the name and colors of this club pay tribute.

On December 1, 2020, the club's franchise was put on hiatus by the LBM due to financial problems and the lack of a new board of directors that could have provided financial support to the club. There have been some rumors about team possibly returning in the following season if it managed to improve its financial situation and was able to comply with the guidelines of the competition, although it never happened.

== Players ==
=== First-team squad ===
As of 13 October 2020
