= Los Cabos F.C. =

Mexican association football club

- Full name: Los Cabos Fútbol Club
- Founded: 21 July 2020; 5 years ago
- Dissolved: 1 December 2020; 5 years ago
- Ground: Don Koll Sports Complex; Estadio Yenekamu; Cabo San Lucas, Baja California Sur
- Capacity: 3,500; 7,000
- Chairman: Gaspar López Villafuerte
- League: Liga de Balompié Mexicano
- 2020–21: Withdrew
| Home colours | Away colours |

Los Cabos Fútbol Club was a Mexican professional football team based in Cabo San Lucas, Baja California Sur, which competed in the Liga de Balompié Mexicano. During the 2020–21 season, it was the only professional team in Baja California Sur in the LBM.

== History ==
The team was founded on July 21, 2020, as the 18th LBM franchise. It was the third professional soccer team in Los Cabos, Baja California Sur, after Delfines de Los Cabos, which competed in the Segunda División de México between 2007 and 2011, and the Club Guerreros Pericúes which played between 2011 and 2017 in the Tercera División de México.

On July, the club introduced Joel Sánchez as its first manager. On August 1, goalkeeper Carlos Velázquez was announced as the first player in the club's history. Los Cabos was the first club to sign a player from a team affiliated with the Federación Mexicana de Fútbol (FMF), it was Ismael Valadéz, a player of Leones Negros UdeG, a team from the Liga de Expansión MX.

Before starting the season, the team announced the construction of its own stadium, called the Estadio Yenekamu, which has a capacity of approximately 22,000 spectators.

On December 1, 2020, the club's franchise was expelled from the LBM due to economic debts and financial problems, and the lack of a new board of directors that could have provided more financial support to the club. The team could have returned the following season if it was able to manage to improve its financial situation and comply with the guidelines of the competition, although it never happened.

== Stadium ==
Provisionally, Los Cabos F.C. played its home games at the Don Koll Sports Complex, with a capacity for 3,500 spectators. However, the club later built a new provisional stadium in the same place where its venue was later located. After the work was finished, it was able to host 7,000 spectators, and temporarily had mobile stands. As 2022, the official stadium is built and ready to host 7,000 spectators.

== Players ==
=== First-team squad ===
As of 13 October 2020
