= Acapulco F.C. =

Mexican association football club

- Full name: Acapulco Fútbol Club
- Founded: 4 June 2020; 6 years ago
- Dissolved: 17 November 2020; 5 years ago
- Ground: Unidad Deportiva Acapulco; Acapulco, Guerrero
- Capacity: 13,000
- Chairman: TBA
- League: Liga de Balompié Mexicano
Home colours	Away colours

Acapulco Fútbol Club was a Mexican professional football team based in Acapulco, Guerrero that played in Liga de Balompié Mexicano.

== History ==
The team was announced on June 4, 2020 during the celebration of a meeting of teams of the Liga de Balompié Mexicano, becoming the eighth official franchise of the new league. At the time of its foundation, the club had orange and black as its official colors. In August, the team had a change in its identity, going to use the colors blue, white and gold. On November 17, 2020 the team was disaffiliated by the LBM due to debts.

== Stadium ==
Unidad Deportiva Acapulco (English:Acapulco Sports Complex) is a sports complex composed of a 13,000-seat soccer and track and field stadium and a baseball stadium which can seat thousands of people. The soccer/track stadium, which originally seated 8,600, was the home to the dissolved Acapulco F.C. team of the Liga de Balompié Mexicano. The baseball stadium is currently used for amateur and semi-pro baseball, and skateboarding.

== Players ==
=== First-team squad ===
As of 13 October 2020
