= Atlético Jalisco =

Mexican association football club

- Full name: Atlético Jalisco
- Founded: 4 July 2020; 5 years ago
- Dissolved: 9 November 2020; 5 years ago
- Ground: Estadio Tres de Marzo; Zapopan, Jalisco
- Capacity: 18,750
- Owner: TBA
- Chairman: TBA
- League: Liga de Balompié Mexicano
| Home colours | Away colours |

The Jalisco team, formerly called Atlético Jalisco, was a Mexican professional football club based in Zapopan, Jalisco that competed in Liga de Balompié Mexicano.

== History ==
The team was founded on July 4, 2020, being the fourteenth founding franchise in the Liga de Balompié Mexicano, in addition to the third based in the Guadalajara metropolitan area. On July 24, Eduardo Lillingston was appointed as the team's technical director, in addition, the same day the first players in history were announced: Jonny Magallón, César Ibáñez, Jahir Barraza and Ricardo Bocanegra.

On September 1, 2020, the team announced the Estadio Tres de Marzo as its home field, being the third team in the league to use the same venue. On October 17, 2020, the team made its official debut, defeating Club Veracruzano de Fútbol Tiburón 1–3.

At the end of October 2020, it was announced that the players and the coaching staff had not received the established salaries for several months, as a result of this difficult situation, the league board cut off relations with the club's board and temporarily took over the administration. Subsequently, the team lost the right to use the original name and shield, because these had been registered by the previous owners and they denied the rights of use, so on October 31, 2020, the team had to play its match against Chapulineros de Oaxaca as a nameless team. A few days later the team was provisionally named as Jalisco team.

On November 9, 2020, Atlético Jalisco was disaffiliated, because the LBM was unable to find new investors to continue operating the team.

== Stadium ==
The Estadio Tres de Marzo, is situated in Zapopan, Jalisco, district that forms part of the Guadalajara Metropolitan Area, and is the ground of Tecos, which plays in the Segunda División de México. Until, 2020 it was the ground of Atlético Jalisco, Halcones de Zapopan and Jaguares de Jalisco, which were both set to compete in the Liga de Balompié Mexicano. The stadium has a capacity of 18,779 people and was constructed on the campus of the Universidad Autónoma de Guadalajara.

== Players ==
=== First-team squad ===
As of 13 October 2020
