= Robert Herrera =

Uruguayan footballer (born 1989)

Personal information
- Full name: Robert Fabián Herrera Rosas
- Date of birth: 1 March 1989 (age 37)
- Place of birth: Montevideo, Uruguay
- Height: 1.85 m (6 ft 1 in)
- Position: Centre back

Team information
- Current team: Atlético Bucaramanga
- Number: 5

Youth career
- Defensor SC

Senior career*
Years	Team	Apps	(Gls)
2009–2015	Defensor SC	113	(2)
2015–2017	Puebla	63	(2)
2017–2019	Pachuca	41	(1)
2019	→ Barcelona SC (loan)	14	(1)
2020	Peñarol	8	(0)
2021–2022	River Plate	38	(0)
2023	Deportivo Maldonado	13	(1)
2024–	Atlético Bucaramanga	10	(0)

International career
2009	Uruguay U20	8	(0)
- * Club domestic league appearances and goals as of 17 June 2024 (UTC)

Robert Fabián Herrera Rosas (born 1 March 1989 in Montevideo) is a Uruguayan footballer who plays as a defender for Colombian club Atlético Bucaramanga.

== Honours ==
=== Defensor SC ===
- Uruguayan Primera División (3): Runner-Up 2009, 2011, 2012
- Uruguayan Primera División Torneo Clausura (2): 2009, 2012
- Uruguayan Primera División Torneo Apertura (1): 2010

=== Atlético Bucaramanga ===
- Categoría Primera A (1): 2024-I
