= Acaxees de Durango =

Mexican association football club

- Full name: Acaxees de Durango Fútbol Club
- Founded: 17 July 2020; 6 years ago
- Dissolved: 1 December 2020; 5 years ago
- Ground: Estadio Francisco Zarco; Durango, Durango
- Capacity: 18,000
- Chairman: Alonso Rocha
- Manager: Francisco Calderón
- League: Liga de Balompié Mexicano
- 2020–21: Withdrew
Home colours	Away colours

Acaxees de Durango Fútbol Club was a Mexican professional football club based in the city of Durango, Durango, that competed in the Liga de Balompié Mexicano.

== History ==
In March 2020, a local businessman started the procedures for the entry of a local team in the Liga de Balompié Mexicano, a Mexican football competition independent of the Federación Mexicana de Fútbol (FMF) . On July 13, the project was officially announced, that day it was reported that the club would be called Acaxees de Durango, the team was named in honor of a local tribe. On the 17th of the same month, the franchise's entry into the league was confirmed, becoming the fifteenth club in the competition. Francisco Calderón was appointed as the team manager.

On August 11, 2020, the Acaxees announced defender Patricio Araujo as their first official player. In September 2020, the club announced the construction of its own stadium.

On December 1, 2020, the club's franchise was expelled from the LBM due to financial problems and the lack of a new board of directors that could have provided financial support to the club. The team could have returned in the following season if it was able to manage to improve its financial situation and comply with the guidelines of the competition, although it never happened.

== Stadium ==
The Estadio Francisco Zarco is a multi-use stadium in the city of Durango, Durango. The stadium holds 18,000 people. It is used mostly for football matches, and is the home stadium of Alacranes de Durango and the former home stadium of Acaxees de Durango. The stadium is owned by the state of Durango. Acaxees announced the construction of its own stadium in the medium term.

== Players ==
=== First-team squad ===
As of 13 October 2020
