= Cristian Campestrini =

Argentine footballer

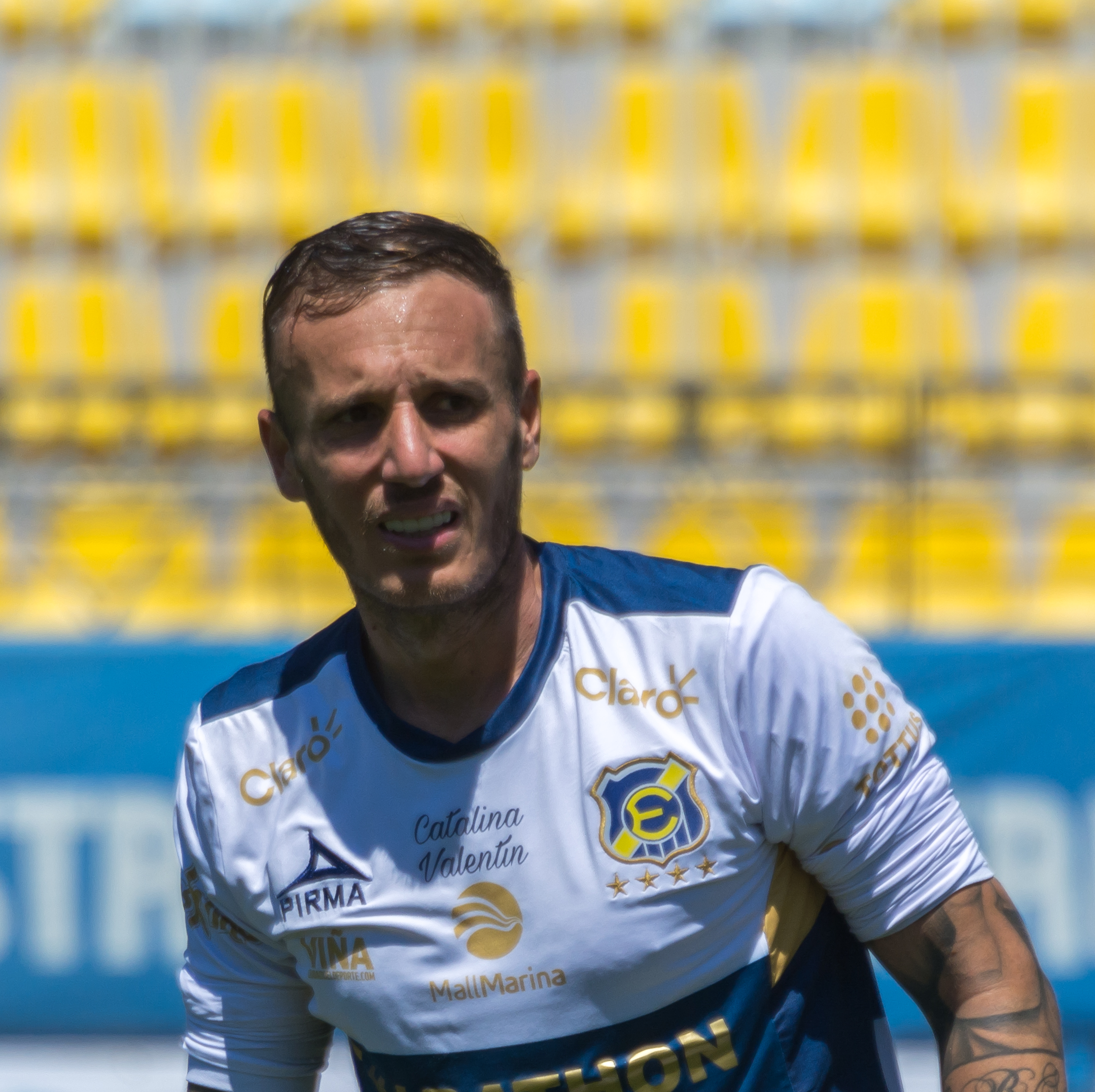
- Campestrini with Everton in 2019

Personal information
- Full name: Cristian Daniel Campestrini
- Date of birth: June 16, 1980 (age 46)
- Place of birth: San Nicolás de los Arroyos, Buenos Aires, Argentina
- Height: 1.82 m (5 ft 11 1/2 in)
- Position: Goalkeeper

Team information
- Current team: Rangers
- Number: 17

Youth career
- Rosario Central

Senior career*
Years	Team	Apps	(Gls)
2001–2002	Rosario Central	1	(0)
2002–2003	Argentino de Rosario	23	(2)
2003–2004	Ferro Carril Oeste	5	(0)
2004–2006	Tigre	51	(1)
2006–2008	Almirante Brown	80	(0)
2008–2014	Arsenal de Sarandí	210	(0)
2015	Olimpia	22	(0)
2015–2017	Puebla	60	(0)
2017	Chacarita Juniors	0	(0)
2018	Sinaloa	19	(0)
2019	Everton	23	(0)
2019–2021	Celaya	39	(0)
2021	Cancún	16	(0)
2022	Barnechea	30	(0)
2023	Deportes Limache	18	(0)
2024	Barnechea	25	(0)
2025	Universidad de Concepción	29	(0)
2026–	Rangers	0	(0)

International career
2009–2010	Argentina	2	(0)
- * Club domestic league appearances and goals as of 25 December 2025

Cristian Daniel Campestrini (born 16 June 1980 in Buenos Aires) is an Argentine professional footballer who plays as a goalkeeper for Chilean club Rangers de Talca.

== Club career ==
Campestrini made his league debut on 10 June 2001 for Rosario Central in a 1–3 home defeat to Belgrano de Córdoba. It was his only league appearance for the club.

In 2002, he began playing in the lower leagues of Argentine football, where he played for Argentino de Rosario, Ferrocarril Oeste, Tigre and Almirante Brown.

In 2008, he returned to the top flight of Argentine football, signing for Arsenal de Sarandí.

=== Puebla ===
On 26 July 2015, Campestrini made his Liga MX debut with Puebla in a home match against Club América. In less than two 'short-seasons' he has been sent off four times. Although Campestrini is loved by his supporters.

=== Deportes Limache ===
In January 2023, he joined Deportes Limache in the Segunda División Profesional de Chile, winning the league title.

=== Return to Barnechea ===
He rejoined Barnechea for the 2024 season after playing for them in 2022.

=== Universidad de Concepción ===
In January 2025, Campestrini joined Universidad de Concepción, becoming the second-oldest player in the Chilean football history at 44 years old after Raúl Coloma. They won the 2025 Primera B de Chile.

=== Rangers de Talca ===
After leaving Universidad de Concepción, Campestrini joined Rangers de Talca for the 2026 season.

On 4 September 2026, Campestrini broke the record for playing professional football to highest age in Chilean football at the age of 46 years and 80 days, which was held by Chilean goalkeeper Raúl Coloma with 46 years old and 75 days.

== International career ==
Campestrini was named by Diego Maradona in a callup of local players to play a friendly against Panama on 20 May 2009. He made his international debut in the game, coming on as a second-half substitute in the 3–1 win. He made his second international appearance in a 3–2 friendly win against Costa Rica on 26 January 2010.

== Honours ==
Arsenal de Sarandí

- Argentine Primera División: 2012 Clausura

Puebla

- Supercopa MX: 2015

Deportes Limache

- Segunda División Profesional de Chile: 2023

Universidad de Concepción

- Primera B de Chile: 2025
