= San José F.C. =

Costarican association football club

San José
- Full name: San José Fútbol Club
- Nickname: Josefinos
- Founded: 11 January 2021; 5 years ago
- Ground: Ernesto Rohrmoser
- Capacity: 3,000
- Manager: Omar Royero
- League: Liga de Ascenso
- Apertura 2023: 4° - Group A

San José Fútbol Club is a Costa Rican soccer team that plays in the Second Division of Costa Rica, the second national category.

== History ==
It was founded in 2021 in the San José canton after some local businessmen acquired the Juventud Escazuceña franchise, which ran into financial problems due to the Covid-19 pandemic at the end of the 2020/21 season.

Despite representing the San José canton, the club will play its inaugural season at the Nicolás Masís Stadium in the Escazú canton.

== Stadium ==
The Nicolás Masís Quesada Stadium is a sports venue located in the city of Escazú in the province of San José, Costa Rica.

It is the local headquarters of the DIMAS de Escazú team of the first division of women's soccer and of San José FC, which plays in the Second Division of Costa Rica.

== Current squad ==
As of June 7, 2023

Note: Flags indicate national team as defined under FIFA eligibility rules; some limited exceptions apply. Players may hold more than one non-FIFA nationality.

No.	Pos.	Nation	Player
1	GK	CRC	Ariel Lopez
2	DF	CRC	Dario Alfaro
3	DF	CRC	Freyman Arce
4	DF	CRC	William Ocampo
7	FW	CRC	Kevin Cunningham (Captain)
8	MF	CRC	Daniel Fernández
9	FW	CRC	Erick Barahona
13	MF	CRC	Elian Morales
14	MF	CRC	Edgar Chacón

No.	Pos.	Nation	Player
17	FW	CRC	Bryan Astúa
18	MF	CRC	Holman Mairena
19	MF	CRC	Christopher Solano
20	MF	CRC	Michael Cordero
21	MF	CRC	Esthuart Dávila
22	GK	CRC	Stuart Arce
24	DF	CRC	Adrián Mora
28	DF	CRC	Allan Miranda
35	GK	CRC	Carlos Méndez
38	GK	CRC	Donovan Navarro
71	MF	CRC	Daniel Torres
99	MF	CRC	Jose Pablo Sancho
