= Atlético Veracruz =

- Full name: Club Deportivo Atlético Veracruz
- Nickname: Piratas (Pirates)
- Founded: 15 May 2020; 6 years ago
- Dissolved: 10 February 2021; 5 years ago
- Ground: Estadio Rafael Murillo Vidal; Córdoba, Veracruz
- Capacity: 3,800
- Owner: Ana María Macías
- League: Liga de Balompié Mexicano
- 2020-21: 7th (Runner-up)
Home colours	Away colours	Third colours

Club Deportivo Atlético Veracruz, commonly known as Atlético Veracruz, was a Mexican football club based in Córdoba, Veracruz that competed in the Liga de Balompié Mexicano.

== History ==
The club was founded on 2013 in Boca del Río, Veracruz as an affiliate of the Tiburones Rojos de Veracruz franchise. In 2016, the team was dissolved. In 2020, the club was reestablished to participate in the Liga de Balompié Mexicano as one of its founding members.

In June 2020, the club announced Mexican-Argentine Lucas Ayala as their manager.

On October 25, 2020, the club's first official match was played, Atlético Veracruz tied three goals with Halcones de Zapopan; Diego Rafael Jiménez scored the first goal in team history. In December, the first regular season of the LBM ended due to the abandonment of several teams in the competition, for which the Pirates finished in seventh place with twelve points as a result of three wins, three draws and one loss, which allowed them to qualify for the league that would define the title.

At the end of the regular season, the team had been relocated to the Estadio Rafael Murillo Vidal in Córdoba, Veracruz due to financial debts and problems with the ownership of the Estadio Luis "Pirata" Fuente, which were unrelated to the club.

In the championship phase, the club had to play three rounds. In the first, Atlético Veracruz eliminated Jaguares de Jalisco because the rival team did not meet the conditions required in their field; For the next stage, the Pirates defeated Industriales Naucalpan, with this they reached the final where they were defeated by Chapulineros de Oaxaca.

On February 10, 2021, the club announced its retirement from the LBM to seek integration into the Federación Mexicana de Fútbol (FMF), with the aim of being able to participate in the Liga de Expansión MX as of the 2021–22 season, although it was rejected from the league. Subsequently, the team decided to redirect their application and began the procedure to join the Segunda División de México. However, the club was also rejected from the Liga Premier and became a training team for footballers.
