= 2009–10 Toluca FC season =

Toluca
2009–10 season
- Manager: José Manuel de la Torre
- Stadium: Estadio Nemesio Díez
- Apertura: 1st Playoffs: Semifinals
- Bicentenario: 3rd Playoffs: Winners
- CONCACAF Champions League: Semifinals
- Top goalscorer: League: Héctor Mancilla (23 goals); All: Héctor Mancilla (26 goals)
- Biggest win: Toluca 7–0 Marathón (17 September 2009)
- Biggest defeat: América 7–2 Toluca (30 August 2009)
- All statistics correct as of 28 July 2019.

The 2009–10 Deportivo Toluca F.C. season was the 93rd season in the football club's history and the 57th consecutive season in the top flight of Mexican football. The club participated in the Apertura and Bicentenario tournaments of the Mexican Primera División and in the CONCACAF Champions League.

Toluca won the Bicentenario 2010 tournament.

== Coaching staff ==
Position	Name
Head coach	(Mexico) José Manuel de la Torre
Assistant coach	(Mexico) Sergio Lugo
Fitness coach	(Mexico) Carlos García
Masseur	(Mexico) Juan Martínez
Doctor	(Mexico) José Serrano

== Players ==
=== Squad information ===
No.	Pos.	Nat.	Name	Date of birth (age)	Signed in	Previous club
Goalkeepers
12	GK	(Mexico)	Alfredo Talavera	18 September 1986 (aged 22)	2009	(Mexico) Guadalajara
25	GK	(Mexico)	Sergio Pérez	1 January 1988 (aged 21)	2008	(Mexico) Youth system
30	GK	(Mexico)	Miguel Centeno	16 August 1989 (aged 19)	2009	(Mexico) Atlético Mexiquense
Defenders
2	DF	(Argentina)	Diego Novaretti	9 May 1985 (aged 24)	2009	(Argentina) Belgrano
3	DF	(Mexico)	Francisco Gamboa	20 July 1985 (aged 24)	2005	(Mexico) Youth system
6	DF	(Mexico)	Manuel de la Torre	13 June 1980 (aged 29)	2004	(Mexico) UNAM
14	DF	(Mexico)	Édgar Dueñas	5 March 1983 (aged 26)	2004	(Mexico) Youth system
16	DF	(Mexico)	Carlos Galeana	21 December 1989 (aged 19)	2008	(Mexico) Atlético Mexiquense
17	DF	(Chile)	Osvaldo González	10 August 1984 (aged 24)	2010 (Winter)	Universidad de Chile
24	DF	(Mexico)	José Manuel Cruzalta	8 April 1978 (aged 31)	2001	(Mexico) Youth system
Midfielders
5	MF	(Argentina)	Martín Romagnoli	30 September 1977 (aged 31)	2008 (Winter)	(Argentina) Racing Club
8	MF	(Mexico)	Manuel Pérez	22 January 1980 (aged 29)	2010 (Winter)	(Mexico) Indios
10	MF	(Mexico)	Sinha (Captain)	23 May 1976 (aged 33)	1999 (Winter)	(Mexico) Monterrey
13	MF	(Mexico)	Moisés Velasco	16 October 1989 (aged 19)	2006	(Mexico) Atlético Mexiquense
15	MF	(Mexico)	Antonio Ríos	24 October 1988 (aged 20)	2008	(Mexico) Youth System
18	MF	(Mexico)	Isaác Brizuela	28 August 1990 (aged 18)	2009	(Mexico) Youth System
21	MF	(Mexico)	Diego de la Torre	5 February 1984 (aged 25)	2004	(Mexico) Atlético Mexiquense
27	MF	(Colombia)	Vladimir Marín	26 September 1979 (aged 29)	2009	(Paraguay) Libertad
Forwards
7	FW	(Mexico)	Néstor Calderón	14 February 1989 (aged 20)	2008	(Mexico) Atlético Mexiquense
9	FW	(Chile)	Héctor Mancilla	12 November 1980 (aged 28)	2008	(Mexico) Coatzacoalcos
11	FW	(Mexico)	Carlos Esquivel	10 April 1982 (aged 27)	2005	(Mexico) Atlético Mexiquense
19	FW	(Mexico)	Raúl Nava	17 September 1990 (aged 18)	2008	(Mexico) Atlético Mexiquense
22	FW	(Mexico)	Manuel Zárate	3 June 1988 (aged 21)	2009	(Mexico) Atlético Mexiquense

Players and squad numbers last updated on 27 July 2019.
Note: Flags indicate national team as has been defined under FIFA eligibility rules. Players may hold more than one non-FIFA nationality.

== Transfers ==
=== In ===
N	Pos.	Nat.	Name	Age	Moving from	Type	Transfer window	Source
8	MF	(Mexico)	Manuel Pérez	22 January 1980 (aged 29)	Monterrey	Loan	Winter	
17	DF	(Chile)	Osvaldo González	10 August 1984 (aged 25)	Universidad de Chile	Transfer	Winter	

=== Out ===
N	Pos.	Nat.	Name	Age	Moving to	Type	Transfer window	Source
8	MF	(Mexico)	Israel López	29 September 1974 (aged 35)	Cruz Azul	Transfer	Winter	
17	DF	(Mexico)	José Antonio Olvera	4 March 1986 (aged 23)	Guadalajara	End of loan	Winter	
21	MF	(Mexico)	Diego de la Torre	5 February 1984 (aged 25)	San Luis	Loan	Winter	

== Competitions ==
=== Overview ===
Competition	First match	Last match	Starting round	Final position	Record							
Competition	First match	Last match	Starting round	Final position	Pld	W	D	L	GF	GA	GD	Win %
Torneo Apertura	26 July 2009	6 December 2009	Matchday 1	1st (semifinals)	17	11	2	4	34	23	+11	64.71
Torneo Bicentenario	16 January 2010	23 May 2010	Matchday 1	Winners	17	8	6	3	36	21	+15	47.06
CONCACAF Champions League	20 August 2009	7 April 2010	Group stage	Semifinals	10	5	3	2	21	10	+11	50.00
Total					44	24	11	9	91	54	+37	54.55

Source: Mediotiempo.com

=== Torneo Apertura ===
==== League table ====
Pos	Team	Pld	W	D	L	GF	GA	GD	Pts	Qualification or relegation
1	Toluca	17	11	2	4	32	19	+13	35	Advance to Liguilla
2	Cruz Azul	17	11	0	6	35	19	+16	33	Advance to Liguilla
3	Morelia	17	10	3	4	31	15	+16	33	Advance to Liguilla
4	América	17	8	6	3	29	16	+13	30	Advance to Liguilla
5	Monterrey (C)	17	9	3	5	27	16	+11	30	Advance to Liguilla

Source: Liga MX
Rules for classification: 1) Points; 2) Goal difference; 3) Number of goals scored; 4) Head-to-head results between tied teams; 5) Number of goals scored away; 6) Highest relegation coefficient; 7) Fair Play points
(C) Champions

==== Results summary ====
Overall								Home						Away					
Pld	W	D	L	GF	GA	GD	Pts	W	D	L	GF	GA	GD	W	D	L	GF	GA	GD
17	11	2	4	32	19	+13	35	7	2	0	20	5	+15	4	0	4	12	14	−2

Source: LigaMX

==== Result round by round ====
Round	1	2	3	4	5	6	7	8	9	10	11	12	13	14	15	16	17
Ground	H	A	H	A	H	A	H	A	H	A	H	H	A	H	A	H	A
Result	W	W	W	L	W	L	W	W	W	W	D	D	L	W	L	W	W
Position																	1

Source: LigaMX
A = Away; H = Home; W = Win; D = Draw; L = Loss

==== Matches ====
26 July 2009 1	Toluca	4–3	Guadalajara	Toluca
12:00	Calderón 19'; Nava 36'; Sinha 73'; López 90+4'	Report	Hernández 6'; Galindo 78'; Morales 81'	Stadium: Estadio Nemesio Díez; Referee: Hugo León Guajardo

1 August 2009 2	Chiapas	0–2	Toluca	Tuxtla Gutiérrez
17:00		Report	Calderón 35', 45'	Stadium: Estadio Víctor Manuel Reyna; Referee: Roberto García Orozco

9 August 2009 3	Toluca	3–0	UNAM	Toluca
12:00	Dueñas 32'; Calderón 43'; Marín 81'	Report		Stadium: Estadio Nemesio Díez; Referee: Miguel Ángel Ortega

15 August 2009 4	Monterrey	1–0	Toluca	Monterrey
17:00	Suazo 69'	Report		Stadium: Estadio Tecnológico; Referee: Miguel Ángel Ayala

23 August 2009 5	Toluca	3–0	Santos Laguna	Toluca
12:00	Sinha 6'; Esquivel 21'; Calderón 29'	Report		Stadium: Estadio Nemesio Díez; Referee: Paul Delgadillo

30 August 2009 6	América	7–2	Toluca	Mexico City
17:00	Pardo 2'; Esqueda 20'; Cabañas 26', 45'; Romagnoli 35'; Montenegro 76'; Chitiva 89'	Report	Mancilla 69', 74'	Stadium: Estadio Azteca; Referee: Roberto García Orozco

6 September 2009 7	Toluca	1–0	Morelia	Toluca
12:00	Mancilla 59'	Report		Stadium: Estadio Nemesio Díez; Referee: Miguel Ángel Ortega

12 September 2009 8	Ciudad Juárez	0–1	Toluca	Ciudad Juárez
19:00		Report	Mancilla 43'	Stadium: Estadio Olímpico Benito Juárez; Referee: Ricardo Arellano

20 September 2009 9	Toluca	2–0	Atlas	Toluca
12:00	Mancilla 34'; Esquivel 71'	Report		Stadium: Estadio Nemesio Díez; Referee: Jorge Eduardo Gasso

26 September 2009 10	Cruz Azul	1–2	Toluca	Mexico City
17:00	Lozano 12'	Report	Mancilla 37'; Dueñas 59'	Stadium: Estadio Azul; Referee: Jaime Herrera

4 October 2009 11	Toluca	1–1	San Luis	Toluca
12:00	Mancilla 87'	Report	Moreno 24'	Stadium: Estadio Nemesio Díez; Referee: José Alfredo Peñaloza

17 October 2009 12	Toluca	1–1	UANL	Toluca
19:00	Mancilla 64'	Report	Fonseca 88'	Stadium: Estadio Nemesio Díez; Referee: Hugo León Guajardo

23 October 2009 13	Estudiantes Tecos	2–1	Toluca	Zapopan
20:00	Bareiro 18'; Morales 32'	Report	Mancilla 57'	Stadium: Estadio Tres de Marzo; Referee: Paul Delgadillo

1 November 2009 14	Toluca	2–0	Querétaro	Toluca
12:00	Esquivel 65'; Sinha 80'	Report		Stadium: Estadio Nemesio Díez; Referee: Miguel Ángel Flores

4 November 2009 15	Atlante	3–2	Toluca	Cancún
21:00	Márquez Lugo 32', 83'; Solari 65'	Report	Esquivel 1'; Mancilla 89'	Stadium: Estadio Andrés Quintana Roo; Referee: Miguel Ángel Ayala

8 November 2009 16	Toluca	3–0	Pachuca	Toluca
12:00	Mancilla 44', 53'; Nava 85'	Report		Stadium: Estadio Nemesio Díez; Referee: Miguel Ángel Ortega

14 November 2009 17	Puebla	0–2	Toluca	Puebla
17:00		Report	Nava 15', 26'	Stadium: Estadio Cuauhtémoc; Referee: Germán Arredondo

===== Liguilla =====
====== Quarterfinals ======
22 November 2009 First leg	San Luis	1–0	Toluca	San Luis Potosí City
12:00	Aguilar 76'	Report		Stadium: Estadio Alfonso Lastras; Referee: Roberto García Orozco

29 November 2009 Second leg	Toluca	1–0 (1–1 agg.)	San Luis	Toluca
12:00	Mancilla 77'	Report		Stadium: Estadio Nemesio Díez; Referee: Armando Archundia

====== Semifinals ======
3 December 2009 First leg	Monterrey	2–0	Toluca	Monterrey
21:00	de Nigris 45', 66'	Report		Stadium: Estadio Tecnológico; Referee: José Alfredo Peñaloza

6 December 2009 Second leg	Toluca	1–1 (1–3 agg.)	Monterrey	Toluca
12:00	Brizuela 79'	Report	Carreño 71'	Stadium: Estadio Nemesio Díez; Referee: Jorge Eduardo Gasso

=== Torneo Bicentenario ===
==== League table ====
Pos	Team	Pld	W	D	L	GF	GA	GD	Pts	Qualification or relegation
1	Monterrey	17	10	6	1	30	15	+15	36	Advance to Liguilla
2	Guadalajara	17	10	2	5	28	21	+7	32	Advance to Liguilla
3	Toluca (C)	17	8	6	3	27	15	+12	30	Advance to Liguilla
4	Pumas UNAM	17	7	7	3	20	10	+10	28	Advance to Liguilla
5	Santos Laguna	17	8	4	5	27	25	+2	28	Advance to Liguilla

Source: Liga MX
Rules for classification: 1) Points; 2) Goal difference; 3) Number of goals scored; 4) Head-to-head results between tied teams; 5) Number of goals scored away; 6) Highest relegation coefficient; 7) Fair Play points
(C) Champions

==== Results summary ====
Overall								Home						Away					
Pld	W	D	L	GF	GA	GD	Pts	W	D	L	GF	GA	GD	W	D	L	GF	GA	GD
17	8	6	3	27	15	+12	30	5	2	1	19	7	+12	3	4	2	8	8	0

Source: LigaMX

==== Result round by round ====
Round	1	2	3	4	5	6	7	8	9	10	11	12	13	14	15	16	17
Ground	A	H	A	H	A	H	A	H	A	H	A	A	H	A	H	A	H
Result	L	D	D	D	L	W	D	W	D	L	W	W	W	W	W	D	W
Position																	3

Source: LigaMX
A = Away; H = Home; W = Win; D = Draw; L = Loss

==== Matches ====
16 January 2010 1	Guadalajara	3–1	Toluca	Guadalajara
19:00	Hernández 11', 23'; Medina 54'	Report	Esquivel 36'	Stadium: Estadio Jalisco; Referee: Armando Archundia

24 January 2010 2	Toluca	1–1	Chiapas	Toluca
12:00	Mancilla 13'	Report	Valdez 89'	Stadium: Estadio Nemesio Díez; Referee: Hugo León Guajardo

31 January 2010 3	UNAM	0–0	Toluca	Mexico City
12:00		Report		Stadium: Estadio Olímpico Universitario; Referee: Marco Antonio Rodríguez

7 February 2010 4	Toluca	1–1	Monterrey	Toluca
12:00	Sinha 27'	Report	Pérez 67'	Stadium: Estadio Nemesio Díez; Referee: José Alfredo Peñaloza

13 February 2010 5	Santos Laguna	1–0	Toluca	Torreón
17:00	Peralta 72'	Report		Stadium: Estadio Corona; Referee: Jorge Eduardo Gasso

17 February 2010 6	Toluca	3–1	América	Toluca
21:00	Sinha 15'; Mancilla 51'; de la Torre 59'	Report	Montenegro 70'	Stadium: Estadio Nemesio Díez; Referee: Mauricio Morales

20 February 2010 7	Morelia	0–0	Toluca	Morelia
19:00		Report		Stadium: Estadio Morelos; Referee: Miguel Ángel Ortega

28 February 2010 8	Toluca	3–0	Ciudad Juárez	Toluca
12:00	Esquivel 15'; Mancilla 77'; Marín 84'	Report		Stadium: Estadio Nemesio Díez; Referee: Germán Arredondo

6 March 2010 9	Atlas	1–1	Toluca	Guadalajara
20:45	Alférez 85'	Report	Mancilla 31'	Stadium: Estadio Jalisco; Referee: Jaime Herrera

14 March 2010 10	Toluca	2–3	Cruz Azul	Toluca
12:00	Mancilla 27'; Sinha 36'	Report	Villa 16', 81'; Biancucchi 60'	Stadium: Estadio Nemesio Díez; Referee: Roberto García Orozco

20 March 2010 11	San Luis	2–3	Toluca	San Luis Potosí City
19:00	Moreno 53'; Pérez 57'	Report	Hernández 1' (o.g.); Mancilla 32'; Calderón 89'	Stadium: Estadio Alfonso Lastras; Referee: Rafael Medina

27 March 2010 12	UANL	0–1	Toluca	San Nicolás de los Garza
19:00		Report	Esquivel 73'	Stadium: Estadio Universitario; Referee: Miguel Ángel Ayala

4 April 2010 13	Toluca	5–0	Estudiantes Tecos	Toluca
12:00	Esquivel 12'; González 32'; Sinha 33'; Ríos 54'; Novaretti 58'	Report		Stadium: Estadio Nemesio Díez; Referee: Mauricio Morales

10 April 2010 14	Querétaro	0–1	Toluca	Querétaro City
17:00		Report	Mancilla 4'	Stadium: Estadio Corregidora; Referee: Jorge Eduardo Gasso

14 April 2010 15	Toluca	2–0	Atlante	Toluca
20:00	Esquivel 44'; González 50'	Report		Stadium: Estadio Nemesio Díez; Referee: Armando Archundia

17 April 2010 16	Pachuca	1–1	Toluca	Pachuca
19:00	López 26'	Report	Pérez 38'	Stadium: Estadio Hidalgo; Referee: Ricardo Arellano

25 April 2010 17	Toluca	2–1	Puebla	Toluca
12:00	Sinha 5'; Mancilla 16'	Report	González 9'	Stadium: Estadio Nemesio Díez; Referee: Miguel Ángel Ortega

===== Liguilla =====
====== Quarterfinals ======
2 May 2010 First leg	América	2–2	Toluca	Mexico City
21:00	Beausejour 29'; Layún 23'	Report	Mancilla 2'; Dueñas 25'	Stadium: Estadio Azteca; Referee: Armando Archundia

9 May 2010 Second leg	Toluca	2–0 (4–2 agg.)	América	Toluca
12:00	Sinha 29'; Pérez 88'	Report		Stadium: Estadio Nemesio Díez; Referee: Francisco Chacón

====== Semifinals ======
12 May 2010 First leg	Pachuca	2–2	Toluca	Pachuca
19:00	Manso 60'; Cvitanich 85'	Report	Novaretti 46'; Mancilla 81'	Stadium: Estadio Hidalgo; Referee: Mauricio Morales

15 May 2010 Second leg	Toluca	1–0 (3–2 agg.)	Pachuca	Toluca
20:00	Ríos 41'	Report		Stadium: Estadio Nemesio Díez; Referee: Marco Antonio Rodríguez

====== Final ======
20 May 2010 First leg	Santos Laguna	2–2	Toluca	Torreón
20:00	Quintero 13'; Vuoso 84'	Report	Novaretti 22'; Sinha 67'	Stadium: Estadio Corona; Referee: Marco Antonio Rodríguez

23 May 2010 Second leg	Toluca	0–0 (2–2 agg.) (4–3 p)	Santos Laguna	Toluca
12:00		Report		Stadium: Estadio Nemesio Díez; Referee: Armando Archundia
	Penalties
	Sinha (penalty missed); Marín (penalty scored); Mancilla (penalty missed); Novaretti (penalty scored); Romagnoli (penalty scored); Dueñas (penalty scored)		(penalty scored) Rodríguez; (penalty scored) Ludueña; (penalty scored) Lacerda; (penalty missed) Vuoso; (penalty missed) Morales; (penalty missed) Arce

=== CONCACAF Champions League ===
==== Group stage ====
Team	Pld	W	D	L	GF	GA	GD	Pts
(Mexico) Toluca	6	4	1	1	15	4	+11	13
(Honduras) Marathón	6	4	0	2	12	14	−2	12
(United States) D.C. United	6	3	1	2	12	8	+4	10
(Trinidad and Tobago) San Juan Jabloteh	6	0	0	6	4	17	−13	0

20 August 2009 1	San Juan Jabloteh (Trinidad and Tobago)	0–1	(Mexico) Toluca	Port of Spain, Trinidad and Tobago
20:00			Nava 8'	Stadium: Hasely Crawford Stadium; Attendance: 700; Referee: Wálter Quesada (Costa Rica)

26 August 2009 2	D.C. United (United States)	1–3	(Mexico) Toluca	Washington, D.C., United States
20:00	Pontius 47'		Marín 5'; Mancilla 79', 86'	Stadium: Robert F. Kennedy Memorial Stadium; Attendance: 8,834; Referee: Courtney Campbell (Jamaica)

17 September 2009 3	Toluca (Mexico)	7–0	(Honduras) Marathón	Toluca, Mexico
20:00	Brizuela 13'; de la Torre 14', 67'; Nava 48', 90+1'; Marín 82'; Esquivel 88'			Stadium: Estadio Nemesio Díez; Attendance: 10,000; Referee: Carlos Batres (Guatemala)

23 September 2009 4	Toluca (Mexico)	3–0	(Trinidad and Tobago) San Juan Jabloteh	Toluca, Mexico
22:00	Brizuela 28'; Zárate 65'; Calderón 77'			Stadium: Estadio Nemesio Díez; Attendance: 15,000; Referee: Luis Rodríguez (Panamá)

1 October 2009 5	Marathón (Honduras)	2–0	(Mexico) Toluca	San Pedro Sula, Honduras
22:00	Martínez 9' (pen.); Mejía 35'			Stadium: Estadio Olímpico Metropolitano; Attendance: 1,483; Referee: Walter López (Guatemala)

20 October 2009 6	Toluca (Mexico)	1–1	(United States) D.C. United	Toluca, Mexico
20:00	López 62' (pen.)		Pontius 6'	Stadium: Estadio Nemesio Díez; Attendance: 9,909; Referee: Geoffrey Hospedales (Trinidad and Tobago)

==== Knockout stage ====
===== Quarterfinals =====
9 March 2010 First leg	Columbus Crew (United States)	2–2	(Mexico) Toluca	Columbus, United States
20:00	Lenhart 65', 83'		Sinha 19'; Ríos 44'	Stadium: Columbus Crew Stadium; Attendance: 4,402; Referee: Courtney Campbell (Jamaica)

17 March 2010 Second leg	Toluca (Mexico)	3–2 (5–4 agg.)	(United States) Columbus Crew	Toluca, Mexico
20:00	Mancilla 47' (pen.); Sinha 57', 72'		Barros Schelotto 45' (pen.), 70'	Stadium: Estadio Nemesio Díez; Attendance: 6,946; Referee: Paul Ward (Canada)

===== Semifinals =====
30 March 2010 First leg	Toluca (Mexico)	1–1	(Mexico) Pachuca	Toluca, Mexico
22:00	Dueñas 78'		Cvitanich 34'	Stadium: Estadio Nemesio Díez; Attendance: 13,898; Referee: Ricardo Arellano (Mexico)

7 April 2010 Second leg	Pachuca (Mexico)	1–0 (2–1 agg.)	(Mexico) Toluca	Pachuca, Mexico
20:00	Brambila 6'			Stadium: Estadio Hidalgo; Attendance: 25,000; Referee: Roberto García Orozco (Mexico)

== Statistics ==
=== Goals ===
Rank	Player	Position	Apertura	Bicentenario	Concacaf CL	Total
1	(Chile) Héctor Mancilla	FW	13	10	3	26
2	(Mexico) Sinha	MF	3	7	3	13
3	(Mexico) Carlos Esquivel	FW	4	5	1	10
4	(Mexico) Néstor Calderón	FW	5	1	1	7
4	(Mexico) Raúl Nava	FW	4	0	3	7
6	(Mexico) Édgar Dueñas	DF	2	1	1	4
6	(Colombia) Vladimir Marín	MF	1	1	2	4
8	(Mexico) Isaác Brizuela	MF	1	0	2	3
8	(Argentina) Diego Novaretti	DF	0	3	0	3
8	(Mexico) Antonio Ríos	MF	0	2	1	3
11	(Mexico) Diego de la Torre	MF	0	0	2	2
11	(Chile) Osvaldo González	DF	0	2	0	2
11	(Mexico) Israel López	MF	1	0	1	2
11	(Mexico) Manuel Pérez	MF	0	2	0	2
15	(Mexico) Manuel de la Torre	DF	0	1	0	1
15	(Mexico) Manuel Zárate	FW	0	0	1	1
Total			34	35	21	90

=== Clean sheets ===
Rank	Name	Apertura	Bicentenario	Concacaf CL	Total
1	(Mexico) Alfredo Talavera	7	10	2	19
2	(Argentina) Hernán Cristante	4	0	1	5
Total		11	10	3	24

=== Own goals ===
Player	Against	Result	Date	Competition
(Argentina) Martín Romagnoli	América	2–7 (A)	30 August 2009	Primera División
