= 2011–12 Toluca FC season =

Toluca
2011–12 season
- Chairman: Fernando Corona
- Manager: Héctor Hugo Eugui (May, 2011–Nov., 2011); Wilson Graniolatti (from Nov. 2011)
- Stadium: Estadio Nemesio Díez
- Apertura 2011: 13th
- Clausura 2012: 10th
- Top goalscorer: League: Apertura: Iván Alonso (11); Clausura: Iván Alonso (14); All: Iván Alonso (25)
Home colours	Away colours	Third colours

The 2011–12 Toluca season was the 65th professional season of Mexico's top-flight football league. The season is split into two tournaments—the Torneo Apertura and the Torneo Clausura—each with identical formats and each contested by the same eighteen teams. Toluca began their season on July 22, 2011, against Estudiantes Tecos, Toluca play their homes games on Sundays at 12:00pm local time.

== Torneo Apertura ==
=== Squad ===
Note: Flags indicate national team as defined under FIFA eligibility rules; some limited exceptions apply. Players may hold more than one non-FIFA nationality.

No.	Pos.	Nation	Player
1	GK	MEX	Alfredo Talavera
2	DF	ARG	Diego Novaretti
3	GK	MEX	Jorge Villalpando
4	DF	MEX	Francisco Gamboa
5	MF	ARG	Martín Romagnoli
6	DF	MEX	Manuel de la Torre
7	MF	MEX	Néstor Calderón
8	MF	MEX	Diego de la Torre
10	MF	MEX	Sinha (Captain)
11	FW	MEX	Carlos Esquivel
12	GK	MEX	Miguel Ángel Centeno
14	DF	MEX	Édgar Dueñas (Vice-Captain)
15	MF	MEX	Antonio Ríos
16	DF	MEX	Carlos Alberto Galeana

No.	Pos.	Nation	Player
17	FW	MEX	Arturo Tapia
18	FW	MEX	Isaác Brizuela
19	FW	MEX	Raúl Nava
20	DF	PAR	Aureliano Torres
21	MF	MEX	Gabriel Velasco
22	DF	MEX	Félix Araujo
23	MF	MEX	Francisco González
24	FW	URU	Iván Alonso
26	MF	MEX	Ervín Alejandro Trejo
27	DF	MEX	José Manuel Cruzalta
28	MF	MEX	Juan José Calderón
30	GK	MEX	Ernesto Sánchez
39	FW	MEX	Alexis Guillermo Ochoa

=== Regular season ===
==== Apertura 2011 results ====
July 22, 2011 Round 1	Estudiantes Tecos	1 – 2	Toluca	Estadio Tres de Marzo, Zapopan
20:10	Medina (yellow card) 52'; Sambueza (yellow card) 55'; Colace (yellow card) 64'; Lillingston 65'; Davino (yellow card) 74'	Report	Alonso 6'; Calderón 10'; Ríos (yellow card) 55'; Novaretti (yellow card) 65'	Referee: Óscar Macias

July 31, 2011 Round 2	Toluca	1 – 1	América	Estadio Nemesio Díez, Toluca
12:00	Alonso 2'; Sinha (yellow card) 4'; Dueñas (yellow card) 26' (yellow-red card) 28' de la Torre (yellow card) 30'	Report	Molina (yellow card) 3'; Vuoso 22'; Rosinei (yellow card) 55'; Medina (yellow card) 86'	Referee: Jorge Isaac Rojas

August 3, 2011 Round 3	UANL	2 – 2	Toluca	Estadio Universitario, San Nicolás
20:45	Mancilla 16', (yellow card) 87'; Ayala (yellow card) 47'; Lobos 61'; Viniegra (yellow card) 90'	Report	Gamboa (yellow card) 30'; Calderón 71'; Sinha 79', (yellow card) 90'; Araújo (yellow card) 87'	Referee: Jorge Antonio Pérez

August 7, 2011 Round 4	Toluca	0 – 0	Atlas	Estadio Nemesio Díez, Toluca
12:00	Novaretti (yellow card) 18'; Esquivel (yellow card) 24'; Dueñas (yellow card) 44'; Romagnoli (yellow card) 58' de la Torre (yellow card) 71'	Report	Ayala (yellow card) 40'; Welcome (yellow card) 48'; Vidrio (yellow card) 63'; Rodríguez (yellow card) 64'; Romero (red card) 90+1'	Referee: Antony Zanjuampa

August 13, 2011 Round 5	Pachuca	3 – 0	Toluca	Estadio Hidalgo, Pachuca
19:00	Esqueda 2', (yellow card) 78'; Rodríguez 33'; Cejas 78'	Report	Sinha (red card) 73'; Talavera (yellow card) 83'	Referee: osé Alfredo Peñaloza

August 21, 2011 Round 6	Toluca	2 – 1	Atlante	Estadio Nemesio Díez, Toluca
12:00	de la Torre (yellow card) 50'; Calderón 53'; Brizuela 66'	Report	A. Muñoz (yellow card) 35'; Bermúdez 46'; Guadarrama (yellow card) 73'	Referee: Miguel Ángel Ortega

August 26, 2011 Round 7	Chiapas	1 – 1	Toluca	Estadio Victor Manuel Reyna, Tuxtla Gutiérrez
20:10	Fuentes (yellow card) 6'; Arizala 67'	Report	Novaretti (yellow card) 65'; Alonso 71', (yellow card) 86'	Referee: Miguel Ángel Flores

September 11, 2011 Round 8	Toluca	1 – 1	Tijuana	Estadio Nemesio Díez, Toluca
12:00	Torres (yellow card) 70'; Alonso 66'	Report	Arce (yellow card) 17'; Núñez (yellow card) 31'; Gandolfi (yellow card) 63'; Leandro (yellow card) 65' (red card) 73' del Olmo (red card) 66' (manager); Sand 90+2'	Referee: Ricardo Arellano

September 18, 2011 Round 9	UNAM	4 – 1	Toluca	Estadio Victor Manuel Reyna, Tuxtla Gutierrez
17:00	Orrantia 23'; Bravo 45+4' (pen.); Cortés 57' (pen.); Cabrera (yellow card) 74'; Izazola 79'	Report	Alonso 6'; Dueñas (yellow card) 45+1'	Referee: Erim Ramírez

September 25, 2011 Round 10	Toluca	2 – 1	Morelia	Estadio Nemesio Díez, Toluca
12:00	Alonso 37', 79'; Atalavera (yellow card) 90+3'	Report	Huiqui (yellow card) 19'; Sandoval 49'; E. Pérez (yellow card) 89'	Referee: Marco Antonio Rodríguez

October 1, 2011 Round 11	Monterrey	0 – 0	Toluca	Estadio Tecnológico, Monterrey
19:00		Report	Sinha (yellow card) 45'; Gamboa (yellow card) 47'; Novaretti (yellow card) 65'	Referee: Francisco Chacón

October 8, 2011 Round 12	Toluca	0 – 0	Guadalajara	Estadio Nemesio Díez, Toluca
17:00	Cruzalta (yellow card) 49'; Romagnoli (yellow card) 76'; Alonso (yellow card) 88'	Report	Fabián (yellow card) 50'; Medina (yellow card) 65'; Reynoso (yellow card) 90'	Referee: Jorge Antonio Pérez

October 15, 2011 Round 13	Santos Laguna	3 – 2	Toluca	Estadio Corona, Torreón
19:00	Baloy (red card) 24'; Peralta 29', 43'; Rodríguez (yellow card) 57'; Suárez (yellow card) 90', (goal) 90+2'	Report	Sinha 6'; Gamboa (red card) 9'; Brizuela 50'; Novaretti (red card) 72'	Referee: Jorge Isaac Rojas

October 23, 2011 Round 14	Toluca	4 – 3	Puebla	Estadio Nemesio Díez, Toluca
12:00	Alonso 20', 42', 51'; Talavera (yellow card) 58'; González (yellow card) 62'; Esquivel 63'	Report	Pineda 13'; Araujo 23' (o.g.); Beasley (yellow card) 42'; Zamora (yellow card) 46'; Luis García (yellow card) 74', (goal) 90+3'; Ortiz (yellow card) 89'	Referee: Marco Antonio Rodríguez

October 26, 2011 Round 15	Cruz Azul	0 – 0	Toluca	Estadio Azul, Mexico City
19:00	Villa (yellow card) 21'; Giménez (yellow card) 71'	Report	Sinha (yellow card) 24'; Novaretti (yellow card) 59'; Calderón (yellow card) 73'; Gamboa (yellow card) 78'	Referee: Fabricio Morales

October 30, 2011 Round 16	Toluca	0 – 1	Querétaro	Estadio Nemesio Díez, Toluca
12:00		Report	Martínez 24'; Sánchez (yellow card) 62'	Referee: Roberto García Orozco

November 5, 2011 Round 17	San Luis	5 – 1	Toluca	Estadio Alfonso Lastras, San Luis Potosí
20:45	González 4'; Moreno 12', 64' (pen.); Torres (yellow card) 38'; Blanco 60', (yellow card) 61'; Velasco (yellow card) 86'; Aguirre 90'	Report	M. de la Torre (yellow card) 1'; Sinha (yellow card) 38'; D. de la Torre (yellow card) 43'; Dueñas (yellow card) 59'; Alonso 84'	Referee: Fernando Guerrero

Toluca did not qualify to the Final Phase

=== Goalscorers ===
Position	Nation	Name	Goals scored
1.	(Uruguay)	Iván Alonso	11
2.	(Mexico)	Néstor Calderón	3
3.	(Mexico)	Isaác Brizuela	2
3.	(Mexico)	Sinha	2
5.	(Mexico)	Carlos Esquivel	1
TOTAL			19

=== Results ===
==== Results summary ====
Overall								Home						Away					
Pld	W	D	L	GF	GA	GD	Pts	W	D	L	GF	GA	GD	W	D	L	GF	GA	GD
17	4	8	5	19	27	−8	20	3	4	1	10	8	+2	1	4	4	9	19	−10

Last updated: 5 November 2011.
Source: Apertura 2011 results

==== Results by round ====
Round	1	2	3	4	5	6	7	8	9	10	11	12	13	14	15	16	17
Ground	A	H	A	H	A	H	A	H	A	H	A	H	A	H	A	H	A
Result	W	D	D	D	L	W	D	D	L	W	D	D	L	W	D	L	L
Position	5	5	5	6	11	7	7	7	15	10	12	12	14	9	11	13	13

Updated to match(es) played on 6 November 2011. Source: Apertura 2011 results and mediotiempo.com
A = Away; H = Home; W = Win; D = Draw; L = Loss

== Transfers ==
=== In ===
#	Pos	Nat	Player	Age	From	Date	Notes

=== Out ===
#	Pos	Nat	Player	Age	To	Date	Notes
3	GK	(Mexico)	Jorge Villalpando	26	Atlas	December 3, 2011	

== Torneo Clausura ==
=== Squad ===
Note: Flags indicate national team as defined under FIFA eligibility rules; some limited exceptions apply. Players may hold more than one non-FIFA nationality.

No.	Pos.	Nation	Player
1	GK	MEX	Alfredo Talavera
2	DF	ARG	Diego Novaretti
3	MF	URU	Gonzalo Porras
4	DF	MEX	Francisco Gamboa
5	MF	ARG	Martín Romagnoli
6	DF	MEX	Manuel de la Torre
7	MF	MEX	Néstor Calderón
8	MF	MEX	Diego de la Torre
10	MF	MEX	Sinha (captain)
11	FW	MEX	Carlos Esquivel
12	GK	MEX	Miguel Ángel Centeno
13	DF	MEX	Héctor Acosta
14	DF	MEX	Édgar Dueñas
15	MF	MEX	Antonio Ríos
16	DF	MEX	Carlos Alberto Galeana

No.	Pos.	Nation	Player
17	FW	MEX	Arturo Tapia
18	FW	MEX	Isaác Brizuela
19	FW	MEX	Raúl Nava
20	MF	PAR	Aureliano Torres
21	MF	MEX	Gabriel Velasco
22	DF	MEX	Félix Araujo
23	FW	URU	Iván Alonso
24	MF	MEX	Ervín Alejandro Trejo
25	DF	MEX	José Manuel Cruzalta
26	MF	MEX	Juan José Calderón
27	GK	MEX	Ernesto Sánchez
28	FW	MEX	Arturo Tapia
29	GK	MEX	Eduardo Millán
30	GK	USA	Josue Gonzalez

=== Regular season ===
==== Clausura 2012 results ====
January 8, 2012 Round 1	Toluca	3 – 1	Estudiantes Tecos	Estadio Nemesio Díez, Toluca
12:00	Alonso 57', 81'; Gamboa (yellow card) 63'; Dueñas 64'	Report	Alanis (yellow card) 40'; Pereyra (yellow card) 45+'; Castro (yellow card) 49'; Bareiro 83'	Referee: Francisco Chacón

January 15, 2012 Round 2	América	1 – 1	Toluca	Estadio Azteca, Mexico City
16:00	Reyes (yellow card) 77'; Vuoso 85' (pen.)	Report	Gamboa (yellow card) 23'; Alonsp 55', (yellow card) 83'; Romagnoli (yellow card) 76'; Talavera (yellow card) 90'	Referee: Erim Ramírez

August 3, 2011 Round 3	Toluca	2 – 1	UANL	Estadio Nemesio Díez, Toluca
12:00	Novaretti (yellow card) 36'; Calderón 45+'; Alonso 48'	Report	Mancilla 24' (pen.); Pacheco (yellow card) 28'	Referee: Jorge Isaac Rojas

January 28, 2012 Round 4	Atlas	1 – 0	Toluca	Estadio Jalisco, Guadalajara
20:45	Rodríguez (yellow card) 14'; Maldonado (yellow card) 14', (goal) 48'	Report	Calderón (yellow card) 8'; Porras (yellow card) 32'; Dueñas (yellow card) 41' (yellow-red card) 77'; Alonso (yellow card) 61'	Referee: Miguel Ángel Chacón

February 5, 2012 Round 5	Toluca	3 – 4	Pachuca	Estadio Nemesio Díez, Toluca
12:00	Muñoz Mustafa 1' (o.g.); M. de la Torre (yellow card) 6'; Alonso 11'; Calderón 16'; Romagnoli (yellow card) 29'; Talavera (yellow card) 90+1'	Report	Muñoz Mustafa (yellow card) 9'; Cejas 35', 90+2' (pen.); Arreola 40', (yellow card) 41'; Bueno 64'; Cota (yellow card) 86'	Referee: Mauricio Morales

February 11, 2012 Round 6	Atlante	0 – 2	Toluca	Estadio Andrés Quintana Roo, Cancún
21:00	Cuevas (yellow card) 26'; Martínez (yellow card) 48'; Arroyo (yellow card) 78'; Rojas (yellow card) 81'	Report	Alonso 2', 32'; Gamboa (yellow card) 83'	Referee: Ricardo Arellano

February 19, 2012 Round 7	Toluca	3 – 1	Chiapas	Estadio Nemesio Díez, Toluca
12:00	Esquivel 12', 74'; Alonso 25'; Sinha (yellow card) 39'; Novaretti (yellow card) 66'; Ríos (yellow card) 77'	Report	Flores (yellow card) 38'; M. Martínez (yellow card) 39'; Andrade (yellow card) 48'; J. Martínez 79'; Arizala (yellow card) 90+2'	Referee: Marco Antonio Rodríguez

February 25, 2012 Round 8	Tijuana	1 – 1	Toluca	Estadio Caliente, Tijuana
19:00	Corona 15'; Nuñez (yellow card) 27'; Santiago (red card) 56'	Report	Alonso (yellow card) 24'; Ríos (yellow card) 79'; Sinha (yellow card) 90+1'	Referee: Miguel Ángel Ortega

March 4, 2012 Round 9	Toluca	0 – 2	UNAM	Estadio Nemesio Díez, Toluca
12:00	Ríos (yellow card) 25'; Novaretti (yellow card) 66'; D. de la Torre (yellow card) 69'	Report	Velarde 32', (yellow card) 89'; Verón (yellow card) 32'; M. Palacios (yellow card) 33'; García 61'; Herrera (yellow card) 89'	Referee: Francisco Chacón

March 9, 2012 Round 10	Morelia	1 – 2	Toluca	Estadio Morelos, Morelia
20:10	Gastélum (yellow card) 30', (goal) 35'	Report	Ríos 11', (yellow card) 69'; Torres 18'; Sinha (yellow card) 40'; Talavera (yellow card) 45+'; Romagnoli (yellow card) 63'; Alonso (yellow card) 75'	Referee: Erim Ramírez

March 18, 2012 Round 11	Toluca	1 – 1	Monterrey	Estadio Nemesio Díez, Toluca
12:00	Alonso 31' (pen.); Torres (yellow card) 60'; Dueñas (yellow card) 74'	Report	Reyna (yellow card) 25'; Morales (yellow card) 30'; Delgado (yellow card) 36'; Basanta (yellow card) 62'; Cardozo 78'	Referee: José Alfredo Peñaloza

March 24, 2012 Round 12	Guadalajara	2 – 0	Toluca	Estadio Omnilife, Zapopan
19:00	Arellano 24'; Álvarez (yellow card) 38'; Araujo (yellow card) 56'; Reynoso 62' (pen.); Fierro (yellow card) 88'	Report	Talavera (yellow card) 61'; Torres (yellow card) 65'; Dueñas (red card) 88'	Referee: Mauricio Morales

April 1, 2012 Round 13	Toluca	1 – 3	Santos Laguna	Estadio Nemesio Díez, Toluca
12:00	Sinha (yellow card) 41'; Ríos (yellow card) 42'; Torres (yellow card) 42'; D. de la Torre 66'; Novaretti (yellow card) 72' (yellow-red card) 75'	Report	Peralta 20'; Suárez 32'; Quintero 47'; Olivera (yellow card) 71'	Referee: Jorge Eduardo Gasso

April 8, 2012 Round 14	Puebla	2 – 1	Toluca	Estadio Cuauhtémoc, Puebla
12:00	Beasley 51'; Padilla 83', (yellow card) 84'; Salinas (yellow card) 90+1'	Report	Torres 30'; Talavera (yellow card) 90'; Calderón (red card) 90+2'	Referee: Fabricio Morales

April 15, 2012 Round 15	Toluca	0 – 3	Cruz Azul	Estadio Nemesio Díez, Toluca
12:00	Sinha (yellow card) 43'; M. de la Torre (yellow card) 78'; Novaretti (red card) 86'	Report	Giménez 39'; Pereira (yellow card) 45+'; Araujo (yellow card) 60'; Vela (yellow card) 62', (goal) 72'; Aquino (yellow card) 71'; Orozco 90+1'	Referee: Marco Antonio Rodríguez

April 21, 2012 Round 16	Querétaro	2 – 2	Toluca	Estadio Corregidora, Querétaro
17:00	Pérez (yellow card) 24'; Martínez 29', (yellow card) 65'; Oviedo 34'; García (yellow card) 72'	Report	Cruzalta (yellow card) 67'; Alonso 54', 61', (yellow card) 70'	Referee: Antony Zanjuampa

April 29, 2012 Round 17	Toluca	2 – 1	San Luis	Estadio Nemesio Díez, Toluca
12:00	D. de la Torre (yellow card) 20'; Alonso 25', 66'	Report	Sánchez (yellow card) 8'; Arredondo (yellow card) 54'; Pereyra 58'	Referee: Miguel Ángel Ortega

Toluca did not qualify to the Final Phase

=== Goalscorers ===
Position	Nation	Name	Goals scored
1.	(Uruguay)	Iván Alonso	14
2.	(Mexico)	Néstor Calderón	2
2.	(Mexico)	Carlos Esquivel	2
2.	(Paraguay)	Aureliano Torres	2
5.	(Mexico)	Diego de la Torre	1
5.	(Mexico)	Edgar Dueñas	1
5.	(Mexico)	Antonio Ríos	1
5.		Own Goals	1
TOTAL			24

=== Results ===
==== Results summary ====
Overall								Home						Away					
Pld	W	D	L	GF	GA	GD	Pts	W	D	L	GF	GA	GD	W	D	L	GF	GA	GD
17	6	4	7	24	27	−3	22	4	1	4	15	17	−2	2	3	3	9	10	−1

Last updated: 29 April 2012.
Source: Clausura 2012 results

==== Results by round ====
Round	1	2	3	4	5	6	7	8	9	10	11	12	13	14	15	16	17
Ground	H	A	H	A	H	A	H	A	H	A	H	A	H	A	H	A	H
Result	W	D	W	L	L	W	W	D	L	W	D	L	L	L	L	D	W
Position	1	2	1	3	10	7	4	5	8	7	7	8	9	10	10	11	10

Updated to match(es) played on 29 April 2012. Source: Clausura 2012 results and mediotiempo.com
A = Away; H = Home; W = Win; D = Draw; L = Loss
