= 2010–11 Toluca FC season =

The 2010–11 Toluca season was the 64th professional season of Mexico's top-flight football league. The season is split into two tournaments—the Torneo Apertura and the Torneo Clausura—each with identical formats and each contested by the same eighteen teams. Cruz Azul will begin their season on July 25, 2010 against UNAM, Toluca played their home games on Sundays at noon, local time.

== Torneo Apertura ==
=== Squad ===
Note: Flags indicate national team as defined under FIFA eligibility rules; some limited exceptions apply. Players may hold more than one non-FIFA nationality.

No.	Pos.	Nation	Player
1	GK	MEX	Alfredo Talavera
2	DF	ARG	Diego Novaretti
3	DF	CHI	Osvaldo González
4	DF	MEX	Francisco Gamboa
5	MF	ARG	Martín Romagnoli
6	DF	MEX	Manuel de la Torre
7	MF	MEX	Néstor Calderón
8	MF	MEX	Manuel Pérez
9	FW	CHI	Héctor Mancilla
10	MF	MEX	Zinha (Captain)
11	FW	MEX	Carlos Esquivel
14	DF	MEX	Edgar Dueñas

No.	Pos.	Nation	Player
15	MF	MEX	Antonio Ríos
16	DF	MEX	Carlos Alberto Galeana
17	FW	ARG	Juan Cuevas
18	FW	MEX	Isaác Brizuela
19	FW	MEX	Raúl Nava
20	FW	MEX	Alonso Granados
21	FW	MEX	Emmanuel Cerda
23	MF	MEX	Francisco González
25	GK	MEX	Sergio Arturo Pérez
26	MF	MEX	Ervín Alejandro Trejo
29	DF	MEX	Mario Méndez
30	GK	MEX	Miguel Ángel Centeno

=== Regular season ===
July 25, 2010 Round 1	UNAM	2 – 1	Toluca	Estadio Olímpico Universitario, Mexico City
12:00pm	Novaretti 30' (o.g.); Fuentes 73'	Report	Calderón 27'	Referee: Miguel Ángel Ayala Ramírez

August 1, 2010 Round 2	Toluca	1 – 1	Pachuca	Estadio Nemesio Díez, Toluca
12:00pm	Novaretti 88'	Report	Rodríguez 56'	Referee: Jorge Macías Romo

August 7, 2010 Round 3	Chiapas	1 – 1	Toluca	Estadio Victor Manuel Reyna, Tuxtla Gutierrez
5:00pm	Danilinho 7'	Report	Brizuela 68'	Referee: José Alfredo Peñaloza

August 15, 2010 Round 4	Toluca	1 – 1	UANL	Estadio Nemesio Díez, Toluca
12:00pm	Ríos 61'	Report	Itamar 90' (pen.)	Referee: Fabricio Morales

August 21, 2010 Round 5	Atlas	0 – 1	Toluca	Estadio Jalisco, Guadalajara
8:45pm		Report	Zinha 90+2'	Referee: Fernando Guerrero

August 29, 2010 Round 6	Toluca	2 – 0	Querétaro	Estadio Nemesio Díez, Toluca
12:00pm	Méndez 37'; Mancilla 80' (pen.)	Report		Referee: Mauricio Morales

September 10, 2010 Round 7	Necaxa	1 – 1	Toluca	Estadio Victoria, Aguascalientes
8:00pm	Rincón 88'	Report	Mancilla 72'	Referee: Roberto García

September 19, 2010 Round 8	Toluca	2 – 1	América	Estadio Nemesio Díez, Toluca
12:00pm	Mancilla 24'; Zinha 77'	Report	Vuoso 48'	Referee: Armando Archundia

September 26, 2010 Round 9	Morelia	1 – 2	Toluca	Estadio Morelos, Morelia
12:00pm	Droguett 54'	Report	Mancilla 51'; Calderón 62'	Referee: Miguel Ángel Ayala

October 2, 2010 Round 10	Santos Laguna	2 – 0	Toluca	Estadio Corona, Torreón
7:00pm	Cárdenas 38'; Benítez 43'	Report		Referee: Francisco Chacón

October 10, 2010 Round 11	Toluca	0 – 0	Cruz Azul	Estadio Nemesio Díez, Toluca
12:00pm		Report		Referee: Ricardo Arellano

October 16, 2010 Round 12	Monterrey	2 – 0	Toluca	Estadio Tecnológico, Monterrey
9:00pm	Zavala 16'; Gamboa 81' (o.g.)	Report		Referee: Paul Delgadillo

October 24, 2010 Round 13	Toluca	2 – 1	Puebla	Estadio Nemesio Díez, Toluca
12:00pm	Zinha 44'; Mancilla 70'	Report	Pereyra 18'	Referee: Miguel Ángel Flores

October 27, 2010 Round 14	Guadalajara	0 – 0	Toluca	Estadio Omnilife, Zapopan
8:30pm		Report		Referee: Jorge Eduardo Gasso

October 31, 2010 Round 15	Toluca	1 – 2	San Luis	Estadio Nemesio Díez, Toluca
12:00pm	Zinha 69'	Report	Arroyo 3', 53'	Referee: Jaime Herrera

November 5, 2010 Round 16	Estudiantes Tecos	4 – 2	Toluca	Estadio Tres de Marzo, Zapopan
8:00pm	Cejas 51', 63', 86'; Cisneros 81'	Report	Calderón 48'; Cabral 53' (o.g.)	Referee: Mauricio Rafael Morales

November 14, 2010 Round 17	Toluca	1 – 1	Atlante	Estadio Nemesio Díez, Toluca
12:00pm	Ríos 46'	Report	Amione 68'	Referee: Roberto García

=== Goalscorers ===
Position	Nation	Name	Goals scored
1.	(Chile)	Héctor Mancilla	5
2.	(Mexico)	Zinha	4
3.	(Mexico)	Néstor Calderón	3
4.	(Mexico)	Antonio Ríos	2
5.	(Mexico)	Isaác Brizuela	1
5.	(Mexico)	Mario Méndez	1
5.	(Argentina)	Diego Novaretti	1
5.		Own Goal	1
TOTAL			18

=== Results ===
==== Results summary ====
Overall								Home						Away					
Pld	W	D	L	GF	GA	GD	Pts	W	D	L	GF	GA	GD	W	D	L	GF	GA	GD
17	5	7	5	18	20	−2	22	3	4	1	10	7	+3	2	3	4	8	13	−5

Last updated: 29 January 2011.
Source: Apertura 2010 results

==== Results by round ====
Round	1	2	3	4	5	6	7	8	9	10	11	12	13	14	15	16	17
Ground	A	H	A	H	A	H	A	H	A	A	H	A	H	A	H	A	H
Result	L	D	D	D	W	W	D	W	W	L	D	L	W	D	L	L	D
Position	13	13	13	14	10	7	7	5	4	4	4	7	5	7	8	10	11

Updated to match(es) played on 29 January 2011. Source: Apertura 2010 results and mediotiempo.com
A = Away; H = Home; W = Win; D = Draw; L = Loss

== Torneo Clausura ==
=== Squad ===
Note: Flags indicate national team as defined under FIFA eligibility rules; some limited exceptions apply. Players may hold more than one non-FIFA nationality.

No.	Pos.	Nation	Player
1	GK	MEX	Alfredo Talavera
2	DF	ARG	Diego Novaretti
3	DF	CHI	Osvaldo González
4	DF	MEX	Francisco Gamboa
5	MF	ARG	Martín Romagnoli
6	DF	MEX	Manuel de la Torre
7	MF	MEX	Néstor Calderón
8	MF	MEX	Diego de la Torre
10	MF	MEX	Sinha (Captain)
11	FW	MEX	Carlos Esquivel
12	GK	MEX	Miguel Ángel Centeno
13	MF	MEX	Moisés Velasco
14	DF	MEX	Edgar Dueñas
15	MF	MEX	Antonio Ríos

No.	Pos.	Nation	Player
16	DF	MEX	Carlos Alberto Galeana
17	FW	MEX	Arturo Tapia
18	MF	MEX	Isaác Brizuela
19	FW	MEX	Raúl Nava
20	FW	MEX	Alonso Granados
21	FW	COL	Luis Carlos Arias
22	FW	MEX	Emmanuel Cerda
23	FW	ECU	Jaime Ayoví
25	GK	MEX	Sergio Arturo Pérez
26	MF	MEX	Ervin Alejandro Trejo
27	DF	MEX	Héctor Acosta
28	MF	MEX	Juan José Calderón
29	DF	MEX	Mario Méndez
30	GK	MEX	Ernesto Sánchez

=== Regular season ===
January 9, 2011 Round 1	Toluca	1 – 1	UNAM	Estadio Nemesio Díez, Toluca
12:00pm	Calderón 37'	Report	Cacho 80'	Referee: Jorge Eduardo Gasso

January 15, 2011 Round 2	Pachuca	0 – 0	Toluca	Estadio Hidalgo, Pachuca
7:00pm		Report		Referee: Mauricio Morales

January 23, 2011 Round 3	Toluca	2 – 0	Chiapas	Estadio Nemesio Díez, Toluca
12:00pm	Calderón 60'; Ayoví 62'	Report		Referee: Juan Genaro Medrano

January 29, 2011 Round 4	UANL	0 – 1	Toluca	Estadio Universitario, San Nicolás de los Garza
7:00pm		Report	Esquivel 73'	Referee: Jaime Herrera

February 6, 2011 Round 5	Toluca	0 – 0	Atlas	Estadio Nemesio Díez, Toluca
12:00pm		Report		Referee: Marco Antonio Rodríguez

February 12, 2011 Round 6	Querétaro	0 – 5	Toluca	Estadio Corregidora, Querétaro
5:00pm		Report	Sinha 28'; González 49'; Cortés 52' (o.g.); Ayoví 64'; Calderón 89'	Referee: Paul Enrique Delgadillo

February 20, 2011 Round 7	Toluca	2 – 3	Necaxa	Estadio Nemesio Díez, Toluca
12:00pm	Ayoví 44'; Esquivel 54'	Report	Íñiguez 58'; Suárez 77', 80'	Referee: José Alfredo Peñaloza

February 27, 2011 Round 8	América	4 – 3	Toluca	Estadio Azteca, Mexico City
4:00pm	Reyna 43'; Mosquera 50'; Montenegro 53'; Sánchez 68'	Report	González 46'; Novaretti 52', 90+1'	Referee: Mauricio Morales

March 6, 2011 Round 9	Toluca	1 – 6	Morelia	Estadio Nemesio Díez, Toluca
12:00pm	Sinha 23'	Report	Rojas 20'; Sabah 39'; Márquez 46', 60', 72'; Ramírez 60'	Referee: Juan Genaro Medrano

March 13, 2011 Round 10	Toluca	3 – 1	Santos Laguna	Estadio Nemesio Díez, Toluca
12:00pm	Ayoví 1'; Novaretti 5'; Cerda 89'	Report	Peralta 36'	Referee: Roberto García Orozco

March 19, 2011 Round 11	Cruz Azul	1 – 0	Toluca	Estadio Azul, Mexico City
5:00pm	Villa 67'	Report		Referee: Marco Antonio Rodríguez

April 3, 2011 Round 12	Toluca	1 − 1	Monterrey	Estadio Nemesio Díez, Toluca
12:00pm	Ayoví 73'	Report	de Nigris 4'	Referee: Miguel Ángel Chacón

April 10, 2011 Round 13	Puebla	1 – 1	Toluca	Estadio Cuauhtémoc, Puebla
12:00pm	Castillo 90'	Report	Cerda 84'	Referee: Jose Eduardo Gasso

April 13, 2011 Round 14	Toluca	1 – 2	Guadalajara	Estadio Nemesio Díez, Toluca
7:00pm	Reynoso 15' (o.g.)	Report	Fabián 12'; Báez 67'	Referee: Francisco Chacón

April 16, 2011 Round 15	San Luis	1 – 2	Toluca	Estadio Alfonso Lastras, San Luis Potosí
8:45pm	Ponce 85'	Report	de la Torre 81'; Nava 90'	Referee: Ricardo Arellano

April 24, 2011 Round 16	Toluca	4 – 4	Estudiantes Tecos	Estadio Nemesio Díez, Toluca
12:00pm	Calderón 10'; Sinha 17'; Cerda 32', 39'	Report	Dueñas 47' (o.g.); Lillingston 54', 80'; Leaño 84'	Referee: Miguel Ángel Ortega

April 30, 2011 Round 17	Atlante	2 – 1	Toluca	Estadio Quintana Roo, Cancún
9:00pm	Maldonado 8'; Ortiz 74'	Report	Sinha 74'	Referee: Paul Delgadillo

=== Goalscorers ===
Position	Nation	Name	Goals scored
1.	(Ecuador)	Jaime Ayoví	5
2.	(Mexico)	Néstor Calderón	4
2.	(Mexico)	Emmanuel Cerda	4
2.	(Mexico)	Sinha	4
5.	(Argentina)	Diego Novaretti	3
6.	(Chile)	Osvaldo González	2
6.	(Mexico)	Carlos Esquivel	2
6.		Own Goal	2
10.	(Mexico)	Manuel de la Torre	1
10.	(Mexico)	Raúl Nava	1
TOTAL			28

=== Results ===
==== Results summary ====
Overall								Home						Away					
Pld	W	D	L	GF	GA	GD	Pts	W	D	L	GF	GA	GD	W	D	L	GF	GA	GD
17	5	6	6	28	27	+1	21	2	4	3	15	18	−3	3	2	3	13	9	+4

Last updated: 6 May 2011.
Source: Clausura 2011 results

==== Results by round ====
Round	1	2	3	4	5	6	7	8	9	10	11	12	13	14	15	16	17
Ground	H	A	H	A	H	A	H	A	H	H	A	H	A	H	A	H	A
Result	D	D	W	W	D	W	L	L	L	W	L	D	D	L	W	D	L
Position	11	12	5	4	6	2	4	8	9	7	10	9	9	9	9	10	12

Updated to match(es) played on 6 May 2011. Source: Clausura 2011 results and mediotiempo.com
A = Away; H = Home; W = Win; D = Draw; L = Loss
