= Primera División de México 2010 Bicentenario Liguilla Final =

Primera División de México Bicentenario 2010 Liguilla Final
- Event: 2010 Bicentenario Liguilla
Santos Laguna	Toluca
(Mexico)	(Mexico)
2	2
- On aggregate

First leg
Santos Laguna	Toluca
2	2
- Date: May 20, 2010 20:00 (UTC-6)
- Venue: Estadio Corona, Torreón, Coahuila
- Man of the Match: (Mexico) Zinha
- Referee: Marco Antonio Rodríguez Moreno (Mexico)
- Attendance: 30,000
- Weather: Sunny

Second leg
Toluca	Santos Laguna
0	0
- (a.e.t.)
- Date: May 23, 2010 12:00 (UTC-6)
- Venue: Estadio Nemesio Díez, Toluca, State of Mexico
- Man of the Match: (Mexico) Édgar Dueñas
- Referee: Armando Archundia Téllez (Mexico)
- Attendance: 27,000
- Weather: Sunny 27 °C (81 °F)

The 2010 Bicentenario Liguilla Final is a two-legged football match-up to determine the 2010 Bicentenario champion.

After 17 matches on regular season, and 2 two-legged rounds of Liguilla, Toluca and Santos Laguna have reached the final.

After a 2–2 draw in the first leg, the teams battled to a scoreless tie in the second leg; Santos Laguna captured the title via penalty shootout.

== Final rules ==
Like other match-ups in the knockout round, the teams will play two games, one at each team's home stadium. As the highest seeded team determined at the beginning of the Liguilla, Toluca was to have home-field advantage for the second leg.

However, the tiebreaking criteria used in previous rounds will not be the same in the final. If the teams remained tied after 90 minutes of play during the 2nd leg, extra time will be used, followed by a penalty shootout if necessary.

== Final summary ==
=== First leg ===
May 20, 2010
20:00

Santos Laguna	2 – 2	Toluca
Quintero 14'; Vuoso 84'	(Report)	Novaretti 22'; Zinha 67'

Estadio Corona
Torreón, Coahuila
Referee: Marco Antonio Rodríguez Moreno (Mexico)

Santos Laguna	Toluca

Santos Laguna
GK	1	(Mexico) Oswaldo Sánchez (c)
RB	4	(Mexico) Iván Estrada (yellow card) 33' (substituted off) 46'
CB	23	(Panama) Felipe Baloy
CB	3	(Uruguay) Jonathan Lacerda
LB	27	(Mexico) José Olvera
DM	7	(Argentina) Walter Jiménez (substituted off) 46'
DM	8	(Mexico) Carlos Adrian Morales
RW	5	(Mexico) Fernando Arce (substituted off) 60'
LW	11	(Mexico) José Cárdenas
CF	24	(Mexico) Oribe Peralta
CF	28	(Colombia) Darwin Quintero
Substitutes
GK	25	(Mexico) Miguel Becerra
DF	21	(Mexico) Juan Pablo Santiago (substituted on) 46'
DF	125	(Mexico) Rafael Figueroa
MF	10	(Argentina) Daniel Ludueña
MF	26	(Mexico) Francisco Javier Torres (substituted on) 60'
FW	9	(Mexico) Carlos Ochoa (substituted on) 46' (yellow card) 87'
FW	30	(Mexico) Matías Vuoso
Manager
(Argentina) Rubén Omar Romano

Toluca
GK	12	(Mexico) Alfredo Talavera
RB	24	(Mexico) José Manuel Cruzalta (yellow card) 29'
CB	2	(Argentina) Diego Novaretti
CB	14	(Mexico) Édgar Dueñas (yellow card) 55'
LB	6	(Mexico) Manuel de la Torre (red card) 90+2'
DM	5	(Argentina) Martín Romagnoli
DM	15	(Mexico) Antonio Ríos
RW	7	(Mexico) Néstor Calderón (substituted off) 68'
LW	11	(Mexico) Carlos Esquivel
SS	10	(Mexico) Zinha (c) (substituted off) 78'
CF	9	(Chile) Héctor Mancilla (yellow card) 42' (substituted off) 84'
Substitutes
GK	30	(Mexico) Miguel Centeno
DF	3	(Mexico) Francisco Gamboa
DF	16	(Mexico) Carlos Galeana
MF	8	(Mexico) Manuel Pérez (substituted on) 78'
MF	27	(Colombia) Vladimir Marín (substituted on) 68'
FW	18	(Mexico) Isaác Brizuela
FW	19	(Mexico) Raúl Nava (substituted on) 84'
Manager
(Mexico) José Manuel de la Torre

Man of the Match
(Mexico) Zinha
Fans' Man of the Match
(Mexico) Matías Vuoso
Assistant referees
(Mexico) José Luis Camargo Callado
(Mexico) Alberto Morín Méndez
Fourth official
(Mexico) Jorge Eduardo Gasso Flores

=== Second leg ===
May 23, 2010
12:00

Toluca	0 – 0	Santos Laguna
	(Report)
Penalties
Zinha (penalty missed); Marín (penalty scored); Mancilla (penalty missed); Novaretti (penalty scored); Romagnoli (penalty scored); Dueñas (penalty scored)	4 – 3	(penalty scored) Rodríguez; (penalty scored) Ludueña; (penalty scored) Lacerda; (penalty missed) Vuoso; (penalty missed) Morales; (penalty missed) Arce

Estadio Nemesio Díez
Toluca, State of Mexico
Attendance: 27,000
Referee: Armando Archundia Téllez (Mexico)

Toluca	Santos Laguna

Toluca
GK	12	(Mexico) Alfredo Talavera
RB	24	(Mexico) José Manuel Cruzalta (substituted off) 81'
CB	2	(Argentina) Diego Novaretti
CB	14	(Mexico) Édgar Dueñas (yellow card) 60'
LB	17	(Chile) Osvaldo González
DM	5	(Argentina) Martín Romagnoli
DM	15	(Mexico) Antonio Ríos
RW	7	(Mexico) Néstor Calderón (substituted off) 74'
LW	11	(Mexico) Carlos Esquivel (substituted off) 99'
SS	10	(Mexico) Zinha (c) (yellow card) 34'
CF	9	(Chile) Héctor Mancilla (yellow card) 36'
Substitutes
GK	25	(Mexico) Sergio Arturo Pérez
DF	3	(Mexico) Francisco Gamboa (substituted on) 81'
DF	16	(Mexico) Carlos Galeana
MF	8	(Mexico) Manuel Pérez
MF	27	(Colombia) Vladimir Marín (substituted on) 74'
FW	18	(Mexico) Isaác Brizuela (substituted on) 99'
FW	19	(Mexico) Raúl Nava
Manager
(Mexico) José Manuel de la Torre

Santos Laguna
GK	1	(Mexico) Oswaldo Sánchez (c)
RB	4	(Mexico) Iván Estrada (yellow card) 33' (substituted off) 83'
CB	23	(Paraguay) Felipe Baloy (yellow card) 8'
CB	3	(Uruguay) Jonathan Lacerda
LB	8	(Mexico) Carlos Adrián Morales (yellow card) 49'
DM	58	(Mexico) Juan Pablo Rodríguez (yellow card) 59'
DM	26	(Mexico) Francisco Javier Torres (substituted off) 46'
RW	5	(Mexico) Fernando Arce
LW	11	(Mexico) José Cárdenas (substituted off) 70'
CF	28	(Colombia) Darwin Quintero
CF	24	(Mexico) Oribe Peralta (yellow card) 48'
Substitutes
GK	25	(Mexico) Miguel Becerra
DF	21	(Mexico) Juan Pablo Santiago
DF	27	(Mexico) José Antonio Olvera
MF	125	(Mexico) Rafael Figueroa (substituted on) 83'
MF	7	(Argentina) Walter Jiménez
FW	10	(Argentina) Daniel Ludueña (substituted on) 70'
FW	30	(Mexico) Matías Vuoso (substituted on) 46'
Manager
(Argentina) Rubén Omar Romano

Man of the Match
(Mexico) Édgar Dueñas
Fans' Man of the Match
(Mexico) Alfredo Talavera
Assistant referees
(Mexico) Marvin César Torrentera Rivera
(Mexico) Marcos Quintero Huitrón
Fourth official
(Mexico) José Alfredo Peñaloza Soto
