= Apertura 2012 Liga MX final phase =

Tournament details
- Dates: 14 November – 2 December 2012
- Teams: 8

Tournament statistics
- Matches played: 14
- Goals scored: 36 (2.57 per match)
- Attendance: 398,185 (28,442 per match)

The Apertura 2012 Liga MX final phase commonly known as Liguilla (mini league) was played from 14 November 2015 to 2 December 2015. A total of eight teams competed in the final phase to decide the champions of the Apertura 2013 Liga MX season. Both finalists qualified to the 2014–15 CONCACAF Champions League.

== Qualified teams ==
Pos	Team	Pld	Pts
1	Toluca	17	34
2	Tijuana	17	34
3	León	17	33
4	América	17	31
5	Morelia	17	27
6	Cruz Azul	17	26
7	Monterrey	17	23
8	Guadalajara	17	23

== Bracket ==
Quarter-finals
1	Toluca	2	3	5
8	Guadalajara	1	1	2
4	América	2	1	3
5	Morelia	0	2	2
2	Tijuana	1	1	2
7	Monterrey	0	1	1
3	León	1	3	4
6	Cruz Azul	2	0	3

Semi-finals
1	Toluca	2	1	3
4	América	0	2	2
2	Tijuana	0	3	3
3	León	2	0	2

Finals
1	Toluca	1	0	1
2	Tijuana	2	2	4

== Quarter-finals ==
=== Summary ===
The first legs were played on 14–15 November, and the second were played on 17–18 November 2012.

Team 1	Agg.	Team 2	1st leg	2nd leg
Guadalajara	2–5	Toluca	1–2	1–3
Monterrey	1–2	Tijuana	0–1	1–1
Cruz Azul	2–4	León	2–1	0–3
Morelia	2–3	América	0–2	2–1

=== Matches ===
15 November 2012
21:00 CST (UTC−6)

Guadalajara	1–2	Toluca
Márquez Lugo 75' (pen.)	Report	Ríos 25'; Sinha 30'

Estadio Omnilife, Zapopan
Attendance: 23,189
Referee: Fernando Guerrero (Mexico City)
18 November 2012
12:00 CST (UTC−6)

Toluca	3–1	Guadalajara
Wilson Tiago 56'; Lucas Silva 58'; Cacho 72'	Report	Torres 82'

Estadio Nemesio Díez, Toluca
Attendance: 19,575
Referee: Jesus Fabricio Morales (Sinaloa)

Toluca won 5–2 on aggregate.

15 November 2012
19:00 CST (UTC−6)

Monterrey	0–1	Tijuana
	Report	Garza 87'

Estadio Tecnológico, Monterrey
Attendance: 26,239
Referee: Erim Ramírez Ulloa (Jalisco)
18 November 2012
16:30 PST (UTC−8)

Tijuana	1–1	Monterrey
Aguilar 51'	Report	De Nigris 90+3'

Estadio Caliente, Tijuana
Attendance: 22,333
Referee: Roberto García Orozco (Mexico City)

Tijuana won 2–1 on aggregate.

14 November 2012
19:00 CST (UTC−6)

Cruz Azul	2–1	León
Flores 17'; Pavone 59'	Report	Maz 56'

Estadio Azul, Mexico City
Attendance: 19,220
Referee: Ricardo Arellano (Aguascalientes)
17 November 2012
19:00 CST (UTC−6)

León	3–0	Cruz Azul
Britos 10', 33'; Delgado 87'	Report

Estadio León, León
Attendance: 24,226
Referee: Marco Antonio Rodríguez (Mexico City)

León won 4–2 on aggregate.

14 November 2012
17:00 CST (UTC−6)

Morelia	0–2	América
	Report	Benitez 58', 76'

Estadio Morelos, Morelia
Attendance: 27,614
Referee: Jorge Pérez Durán (Veracruz)
17 November 2012
21:00 CST (UTC−6)

América	1–2	Morelia
Jiménez 39'	Report	Rojas 2'; Sabah 42'

Estadio Azteca, Mexico City
Attendance: 40,633
Referee: Francisco Chacón (Guanajuato)

América won 3–2 on aggregate.

== Semi-finals ==
=== Summary ===
The first legs were played on 22 November, and the second legs were played on 25 November 2012.

Team 1	Agg.	Team 2	1st leg	2nd leg
América	2–3	Toluca	0–2	2–1
León	2–3	Tijuana	2–0	0–3

=== Matches ===
22 November 2012
19:00 CST (UTC−6)

América	0–2	Toluca
	Report	Lucas Silva 55'; Benítez 90+1'

Estadio Azteca, Mexico City
Attendance: 85,515
Referee: Jorge Pérez Durán (Veracruz)
25 November 2012
12:00 CST (UTC−6)

Toluca	1–2	América
Benítez 60'	Report	Layún 16'; Montenegro 37'

Estadio Nemesio Díez, Toluca
Attendance: 19,500
Referee: Roberto García Orozco (Mexico City)

Toluca won 3–2 on aggregate.

22 November 2012
21:06 CST (UTC−6)

León	2–0	Tijuana
Arce 56'; Peña 58'	Report

Estadio León, León
Attendance: 24,808
Referee: Francisco Chacón (Guanajuato)
25 November 2012
16:30 PST (UTC−8)

Tijuana	3–0	León
Martínez 43'; Riascos 68'; Ruiz 90'	Report

Estadio Caliente, Tijuana
Attendance: 19,000
Referee: Marco Antonio Rodríguez (Mexico City)

Tijuana won 3–2 on aggregate.

== Finals ==
=== Summary ===
The first leg was played on 29 November, and the second leg was played on 2 December 2012.

Team 1	Agg.	Team 2	1st leg	2nd leg
Tijuana	4–1	Toluca	2–1	2–0

=== First leg ===
29 November 2012
19:00 PST (UTC−8)

Tijuana	2–1	Toluca
Martínez 24'; Aguilar 40'	Report	Benítez 26'

Estadio Caliente, Tijuana
Attendance: 22,333
Referee: Roberto García Orozco (Mexico City)

==== Details ====
Tijuana	Toluca

GK	13	(Mexico) Cirilo Saucedo
DF	22	(Mexico) Juan Carlos Núñez
DF	6	(Paraguay) Pablo Aguilar
DF	3	(Argentina) Javier Gandolfi (c)
DF	2	(United States) Edgar Castillo
MF	16	(Argentina) Cristian Pellerano	(yellow card) 41'
MF	8	(Mexico) Fernando Arce	(yellow card) 83'
MF	15	(United States) Joe Corona		(substituted off) 73'
FW	11	(Ecuador) Fidel Martínez		(substituted off) 79'
FW	9	(Argentina) Alfredo Moreno		(substituted off) 55'
FW	20	(Colombia) Duvier Riascos
Substitutions:
GK	19	(Mexico) Adrián Zermeño
DF	5	(Mexico) Joshua Abrego
MF	7	(Mexico) Leandro Augusto		(substituted on) 73'
MF	17	(Mexico) Jorge Hernández
MF	23	(Mexico) Richard Ruíz		(substituted on) 55'
MF	26	(Mexico) Diego Olsina
FW	10	(Mexico) Raúl Enríquez		(substituted on) 79'
Manager:
(Argentina) Antonio Mohamed

GK	1	(Mexico) Alfredo Talavera	(yellow card) 81'
DF	7	(Mexico) Marvin Cabrera
DF	2	(Argentina) Diego Novaretti
DF	14	(Mexico) Édgar Dueñas
DF	6	(Mexico) Gerardo Rodríguez
MF	15	(Mexico) Antonio Ríos
MF	5	(Brazil) Wilson Tiago
MF	8	(Brazil) Lucas Silva
MF	10	(Mexico) Sinha (c)	(yellow card) 41'	(substituted off) 71'
MF	23	(Paraguay) Édgar Benítez		(substituted off) 82'
FW	29	(Panama) Luis Tejada
Substitutions:
GK	12	(Mexico) Miguel Centeno
DF	4	(Mexico) Francisco Gamboa
DF	13	(Mexico) Héctor Acosta
MF	18	(Mexico) Isaác Brizuela		(substituted on) 82'
MF	19	(Mexico) Edy Brambila
FW	9	(Mexico) Juan Carlos Cacho		(substituted on) 71'
FW	17	(Mexico) Arturo Tapia
Manager:
(Mexico) Enrique Meza

Assistant referees:
José Luis Camargo (Estado de México)
Juan Rangel Maya (Mexico City)
Fourth official:
Jesús Fabricio Morales (Sinaloa)

=== Second leg ===
2 December 2012
18:00 CST (UTC−6)

Toluca	0–2	Tijuana
	Report	Ruiz 70'; Riascos 71'

Estadio Nemesio Díez, Toluca
Attendance: 24,000
Referee: Francisco Chacón (Guanajuato)

Tijuana won 4–1 on aggregate.

==== Details ====
Toluca	Tijuana

GK	1	(Mexico) Alfredo Talavera
DF	11	(Mexico) Carlos Esquivel	(yellow card) 7'
DF	14	(Mexico) Édgar Dueñas	(yellow card) 69'
DF	2	(Argentina) Diego Novaretti		(substituted off) 66'
DF	6	(Mexico) Gerardo Rodríguez
MF	5	(Brazil) Wilson Tiago
MF	15	(Mexico) Antonio Ríos		(substituted off) 46'
MF	8	(Brazil) Lucas Silva
MF	10	(Mexico) Sinha (c)
MF	23	(Paraguay) Édgar Benítez
FW	29	(Panama) Luis Tejada		(substituted off) 77'
Substitutions:
GK	12	(Mexico) Miguel Centeno
DF	4	(Mexico) Francisco Gamboa
DF	7	(Mexico) Marvin Cabrera
DF	13	(Mexico) Héctor Acosta
MF	18	(Mexico) Isaác Brizuela		(substituted on) 77'
MF	19	(Mexico) Edy Brambila		(substituted on) 46'
FW	9	(Mexico) Juan Carlos Cacho		(substituted on) 66'
Manager:
(Mexico) Enrique Meza

GK	13	(Mexico) Cirilo Saucedo
DF	22	(Mexico) Juan Carlos Núñez
DF	6	(Paraguay) Pablo Aguilar
DF	3	(Argentina) Javier Gandolfi (c)
DF	2	(United States) Edgar Castillo
MF	16	(Argentina) Cristian Pellerano
MF	8	(Mexico) Fernando Arce
MF	15	(United States) Joe Corona		(substituted off) 67'
MF	11	(Ecuador) Fidel Martínez	(yellow card) 86'
FW	9	(Argentina) Alfredo Moreno		(substituted off) 46'
FW	20	(Colombia) Duvier Riascos	(yellow card) 71'	(substituted off) 75'
Substitutions:
GK	19	(Mexico) Adrián Zermeño
DF	5	(Mexico) Joshua Abrego		(substituted on) 67'
MF	7	(Mexico) Leandro Augusto
MF	17	(Mexico) Jorge Hernández		(substituted on) 75'
MF	23	(Mexico) Richard Ruíz		(substituted on) 46'
MF	26	(Mexico) Diego Olsina
FW	10	(Mexico) Raúl Enríquez
Manager:
(Argentina) Antonio Mohamed

Assistant referees:
Alberto Morin Méndez (Chihuahua)
Salvador Rodríguez Gorrocino (Jalisco)
Fourth official:
Jorge Pérez Durán (Veracruz)

== Statistics ==
=== Goalscorers ===
There were 36 goals scored in 14 matches, for an average of 2.57 goals per match.

3 goals

- (Paraguay) Édgar Benítez (Toluca)

2 goals

- (Paraguay) Pablo Aguilar (Tijuana)
- (Ecuador) Christian Benítez (América)
- (Uruguay) Matías Britos (León)
- (Ecuador) Fidel Martínez (Tijuana)
- (Colombia) Duvier Riascos (Tijuana)
- (Mexico) Richard Ruíz (Tijuana)
- (Brazil) Lucas Silva (Toluca)

1 goal

- (Mexico) Othoniel Arce (León)
- (Mexico) Juan Carlos Cacho (Toluca)
- (Mexico) Aldo de Nigris (Monterrey)
- (Mexico) Luis Delgado (León)
- (Mexico) Gerardo Flores (Cruz Azul)
- (United States) Greg Garza (Tijuana)
- (Mexico) Raúl Jiménez (América)
- (Mexico) Miguel Layún (América)
- (Mexico) Rafael Márquez Lugo (Guadalajara)
- (Mexico) Sinha (Toluca)
- (Brazil) Wilson Tiago (Toluca)
- (Uruguay) Sebastián Maz (León)
- (Argentina) Daniel Montenegro (América)
- (Argentina) Mariano Pavone (Cruz Azul)
- (Mexico) Carlos Peña (León)
- (Mexico) Antonio Ríos (Toluca)
- (Ecuador) Joao Rojas (Morelia)
- (Mexico) Miguel Sabah (Morelia)
- (Mexico) Erick Torres (Guadalajara)

=== Assists ===
3 assists

- (Colombia) Hernán Burbano (León)
- (Argentina) Cristian Pellerano (Tijuana)
- (Mexico) Gerardo Rodríguez (Toluca)

2 assists

- (Mexico) Paul Aguilar (América)
- (Brazil) Lucas Silva (Toluca)

1 assist

- (Mexico) Javier Aquino (Cruz Azul)
- (Mexico) Othoniel Arce (León)
- (Mexico) Jesús Corona (Monterrey)
- (United States) Joe Corona (Tijuana)
- (Mexico) Raul Enriquez (Tijuana)
- (Mexico) Marco Fabián (Guadalajara)
- (Argentina) Christian Giménez (Cruz Azul)
- (Mexico) Raúl Jiménez (América)
- (Colombia) Eisner Loboa (León)
- (Ecuador) Fidel Martínez (Tijuana)
- (Brazil) Wilson Tiago (Toluca)
- (Mexico) Leandro Augusto (Tijuana)
- (Mexico) Carlos Peña (León)
- (Argentina) Rubens Sambueza (América)
- (Colombia) Duvier Riascos (Tijuana)
- (Panama) Luis Tejada (Toluca)
- (Mexico) Christian Valdez (Morelia)
