= 2010 Primera División de México Bicentenario Liguilla =

Primera División de México 2010 Bicentenario Liguilla
Tournament details
- Country: Mexico
- Teams: 8

Final positions
- Champions: Toluca
- Runners-up: Santos Laguna

Tournament statistics
- Matches played: 14
- Goals scored: 43 (3.07 per match)

The Liguilla (English: Mini League) of the Primera División de México 2010 Bicentenario was a final mini-tournament involving eight teams of the Primera División de México, in an elimination two-legs playoff.

The first leg Final of the Liguilla was on Wednesday May 20, between Santos Laguna against Toluca.

Defending champions Monterrey, were not able to defend their past championship, as they were knocked out in the first round of the "Liguilla" by Pachuca

== Teams ==
As the 18 teams of the 2010 Bicentenario were divided in three groups of six teams, it was determined that the two top of each group advanced to the Liguilla, even though having had a low performance at the general table. Alongside those six teams, the two best teams at the general table of the remaining 12, regardless of their group, advanced to the Liguilla.

S	Team	Manager	Captain	Performance at the Apertura 2009									
S	Team	Manager	Captain	Pld	W	D	L	GF	GA	GD	Pts	P	Qualified as
1	Monterrey	(Mexico) Víctor Vucetich	(Mexico) Luis Ernesto Pérez	17	10	6	1	30	15	+15	36	1st	First place Group 2
2	Guadalajara	(Mexico) José Luis Real	(Mexico) Luis Ernesto Michel	17	10	2	5	28	21	+7	32	2nd	First place Group 1
3	Toluca	(Mexico) José de la Torre	(Mexico) Zinha	17	8	6	3	27	15	+12	30	3rd	Runner-up Group 1
4	UNAM	(Brazil) Ricardo Ferretti	(Mexico) Sergio Bernal	17	7	7	3	20	10	+10	28	4th	First place Group 3
5	Santos Laguna	(Argentina) Rubén Omar Romano	(Mexico) Oswaldo Sánchez	17	8	4	5	27	25	+2	28	5th	Runner-up Group 3
6	América	(Mexico) Jesús Ramírez	(Mexico) Pável Pardo	17	7	4	6	29	20	+9	25	6th	Runner-up Group 2
7	Morelia	(Mexico) Tomás Boy	(Argentina) Mauricio Romero	17	7	4	6	22	13	+9	25	7th^{2}	Third place Group 2^{1}
8	Pachuca	(Argentina) Guillermo Rivarola	(Colombia) Miguel Calero	17	7	4	6	27	26	+1	25	8th	Fourth place Group 2^{1}

1.Best ranked out of the two top of each group.
2.Although having been tied with points and goal difference with América, Morelia scored less goals throughout the season as opposed to América.

Locations of the 2010 Bicentenario Liguilla teams

== Tie-breaking criteria ==
The Liguilla has a particular tie-breaking criteria: In case of a tie in the aggregate score, the higher seeded team advance.

The exception for this tie-breaking criteria is the final, where the higher seeded team rule is not used. In this case, if the teams remained tied after 90 minutes of play during the second leg of the finals, extra time were used, followed by a penalty shootout if necessary.

== Bracket ==
The Liguilla had those teams play two games against each other on a home-and-away basis. The winner of each match up was determined by aggregate score.

The teams were seeded one to eight in quarterfinals, and re-seeded one to four in semifinals, depending on their position at the general table of the season. Higher seeded teams play on their home field during the second leg.

Also, the highest seeded can choose when, if Saturday or Sunday, they want to play the second leg. As the rules mentioned that one half of the matches must be on Wednesday/Saturday, and the other in Thursday/Sunday, the rest of the teams must suit on that choice.

Quarterfinals
3	Toluca	2	2	4
6	América	2	0	2
1	Monterrey	0	1	1
8	Pachuca	1	2	3
4	UNAM	0	1	1
5	Santos Laguna	2	0	2
2	Guadalajara	2	0	2
7	Morelia	4	1	5

Semifinals
3	Toluca	2	1	3
8	Pachuca	2	0	2
5	Santos Laguna	3	7	10
7	Morelia	3	1	4

Final
3	Toluca	2	0	2 (4)
5	Santos Laguna	2	0	2 (3)

1.Advanced by best position on the general table.

== Quarter-finals ==
The quarterfinals were played on May 1 or 2 (first leg) and May 8 or 9 (second leg).

Team 1	Agg.	Team 2	1st leg	2nd leg
Monterrey (1) (Mexico)	1–3	(Mexico) (8) Pachuca	0–1	1–2
Guadalajara (2) (Mexico)	2–5	(Mexico) (7) Morelia	2–4	0–1
Toluca (3) (Mexico)	4–2	(Mexico) (6) América	2–2	2–0
UNAM (4) (Mexico)	1–2	(Mexico) (5) Santos Laguna	0–2	1–0

Kickoffs are given in local time (UTC-6).

=== First leg ===
May 1, 2010
17:00

Pachuca	1 – 0	Monterrey
Álvarez 29'	(Report)

Estadio Hidalgo
Pachuca, Hidalgo
Referee: Jaime Herrera Garduño (Mexico)

May 1, 2010
19:00

Morelia	4 – 2	Guadalajara
Cabrera 23'; Rey 55'; Pereyra 63'; Borgetti 66'	(Report)	Enríquez 39'; Bravo 45'

Estadio Morelos
Morelia, Michoacán
Referee: Marco Antonio Rodríguez Moreno (Mexico)

May 2, 2010
19:00

Santos Laguna	2 – 0	UNAM
Jiménez 27'; Vuoso 47'	(Report)

Estadio Corona
Torreón, Coahuila
Referee: Miguel Ángel Ortega Rojas (Mexico)

May 2, 2010
21:00

América	2 – 2	Toluca
Beausejour 5'; Layún 23'	(Report)	Mancilla 2'; Dueñas 26'

Estadio Azteca
Coyoacán, Mexico City
Referee: Armando Archundia Téllez (Mexico)

=== Second leg ===
May 8, 2010
18:00

Monterrey	1 – 2	Pachuca
Martínez 32'	(Report)	Brambila 47'; Montes 87'

Estadio Tecnológico, Monterrey, Nuevo León
Referee: Paul Enrique Delgadillo Haro (Mexico)

May 8, 2010
20:00

Guadalajara	0 – 1	Morelia
	(Report)	Hernández 57'

Estadio Jalisco
Guadalajara, Jalisco
Referee: Jorge Eduardo Gasso Flores (Mexico)

May 9, 2010
12:00

Toluca	2 – 0	América
Zinha 29'; Pérez 89'	(Report)

Estadio Nemesio Díez
Toluca, State of Mexico
Referee: Francisco Chacón Gutiérrez (Mexico)

May 9, 2010
17:00

UNAM	1 – 0	Santos Laguna
Íñiguez 53'	(Report)

Estadio Olímpico Universitario, Coyoacán, Mexico City
Referee: José Alfredo Peñaloza Soto (Mexico)

== Semi-finals ==
The semifinals were played on May 12 (first leg) and May 15 (second leg).

Team 1	Agg.	Team 2	1st leg	2nd leg
Toluca (1) (Mexico)	3–2	(Mexico) (4) Pachuca	2–2	1–0
Santos Laguna (2) (Mexico)	10–4	(Mexico) (3) Morelia	3–3	7–1

Kickoffs are given in local time (UTC-6).

=== First leg ===
May 12, 2010
19:00

Pachuca	2 – 2	Toluca
Manso 60'; Cvitanich 86'	(Report)	Novaretti 47'; Mancilla 81'

Estadio Hidalgo, Pachuca, Hidalgo
Referee: Mauricio Rafael Morales Ovalle (Mexico)

May 12, 2010
21:00

Morelia	3 – 3	Santos Laguna
Peralta 7'; Hernández 64'; Rey 86' (pen.)	(Report)	Borgetti 34'; Rodríguez 56' (pen.); Estrada 65'

Estadio Morelos
Morelia, Michoacán
Referee: Francisco Chacón Gutiérrez (Mexico)

=== Second leg ===
May 15, 2010
18:00

Santos Laguna	7 – 1	Morelia
Arce 1'; Quintero 12'; Peralta 15', 51', 81'; Estrada 49'; Vuoso 83' (pen.)	(Report)	Rey 5' (pen.)

Estadio Corona
Torreón, Coahuila
Referee: Armando Archundia Téllez (Mexico)

May 15, 2010
20:00

Toluca	1 – 0	Pachuca
Ríos 41'	(Report)

Estadio Nemesio Díez
Toluca, State of Mexico
Referee: Marco Antonio Rodríguez Moreno (Mexico)

== Final ==
The first and second legs of the final were played on May 20 (first leg) and May 23 (second leg).

Team 1	Agg.	Team 2	1st leg	2nd leg
Toluca(1) (Mexico)	2(4)–2(3)	(Mexico) (2) Santos Laguna	2–2	0–0

Kickoffs are given in local time (UTC-6).

=== First leg ===
May 20, 2010
20:00

Santos Laguna	2 – 2	Toluca
Quintero 14'; Vuoso 84'	(Report)	Novaretti 22'; Zinha 67'

Estadio Corona
Torreón, Coahuila
Attendance: 30,000
Referee: Marco Antonio Rodríguez Moreno (Mexico)

=== Second leg ===
May 23, 2010
12:00

Toluca	0 – 0	Santos Laguna
	(Report)
Penalties
Zinha (penalty missed); Marín (penalty scored); Mancilla (penalty missed); Novaretti (penalty scored); Romagnoli (penalty scored); Dueñas (penalty scored)	4 – 3	(penalty scored) Rodríguez; (penalty scored) Ludueña; (penalty scored) Lacerda; (penalty missed) Vuoso; (penalty missed) Morales; (penalty missed) Arce

Estadio Nemesio Díez
Toluca, State of Mexico
Attendance: 27,000
Referee: Armando Archundia Téllez (Mexico)

== Goalscorers ==
4 goals

- (Mexico) Oribe Peralta (Santos Laguna)

3 goals

- (Colombia) Luis Gabriel Rey (Morelia)
- (Mexico) Vicente Matías Vuoso (Santos Laguna)

2 goals

- (Argentina) Diego Novaretti (Toluca)
- (Chile) Héctor Mancilla (Toluca)
- (Colombia) Carlos Quintero (Santos Laguna)
- (Mexico) Elías Hernández (Morelia)
- (Mexico) Jorge Iván Estrada (Santos Laguna)
- (Mexico) Zinha (Toluca)
- (Mexico) Jared Borgetti (Morelia

1 goal

- (Mexico) Édgar Dueñas (Toluca)
- (Mexico) Fernando Arce (Santos Laguna)
- (Mexico) Marvin Cabrera (Morelia)
- (Mexico) Luis Montes (Pachuca)
- (Mexico) Manuel Pérez (Toluca)
- (Argentina) Walter Jiménez (Santos Laguna)
- (Argentina) Damián Álvarez (Pachuca)
- (Argentina) Damián Manso (Pachuca)
- (Chile) Jean Beausejour (América)
- (Mexico) Juan Pablo Rodríguez (Santos Laguna)
- (Paraguay) Osvaldo Martínez (Monterrey)
- (Mexico) Jorge Enríquez (Guadalajara)
- (Mexico) Omar Bravo (Guadalajara)
- (Argentina) Gabriel Pereyra (Morelia)
- (Mexico) Ismael Íñiguez (UNAM)
- (Argentina) Darío Cvitanich (Pachuca)
- (Mexico) Miguel Layún (América)
- (Mexico) Antonio Ríos (Toluca)
- (Mexico) Edy Germán Brambila (Pachuca)
