= Manuel Zárate =

Mexican footballer (born 1988)

Personal information
- Full name: Manuel Alejandro Zárate del Río
- Date of birth: June 3, 1988 (age 38)
- Place of birth: Guadalajara, Jalisco, Mexico
- Height: 1.82 m (5 ft 11 1/2 in)
- Position: Forward

Youth career
- –2006: Toluca

Senior career*
Years	Team	Apps	(Gls)
2006–2009	Atlético Mexiquense	51	(10)
2009–2010	Toluca	4	(0)
2010	→ La Piedad (loan)	13	(0)
2011	Potros UAEM		
2011	Tampico Madero		
2012	Unión de Curtidores		
2013	Inter Playa del Carmen		
- * Club domestic league appearances and goals

Manuel Alejandro Zárate del Río (born June 3, 1988) is a Mexican former professional footballer who played as a forward.
