= Arturo Tapia =

Mexican footballer (born 1991)

Personal information
- Full name: Arturo Tapia Gonzalez
- Date of birth: 25 January 1991 (age 35)
- Place of birth: Toluca, Mexico State, Mexico
- Height: 1.73 m (5 ft 8 in)
- Position: Forward

Team information
- Current team: C.D. El Árbol Santa Fe (Assistant)

Senior career*
| Years | Team | Apps | (Gls) |
| 2007–2009 | Atlético Mexiquense | 6 | (0) |
| 2011–2013 | Deportivo Toluca | 4 | (0) |
| 2014–2019 | Potros UAEM | 140 | (14) |
| 2020 | Cafetaleros de Chiapas | 2 | (0) |
| 2020 | Industriales Naucalpan F.C. | 0 | (0) |

Managerial career
- 2022–: C.D. El Árbol Santa Fe (Assistant)
- * Club domestic league appearances and goals as of 04:57, 23 January 2020 (UTC)

Arturo Tapia González (born January 25, 1991) is a former Mexican professional footballer who last played for Cafetaleros de Chiapas.
