= Sergio Lugo =

Mexican footballer and manager (born 1957)

Sergio Lugo Barrón (born April 10, 1957, in Mexico City) is a Mexican former professional footballer and manager.
