= Francisco González (footballer, born 1988) =

Mexican footballer

Personal information
- Full name: Francisco Javier González García
- Date of birth: 23 February 1988 (age 38)
- Place of birth: Atlacomulco, Mexico
- Height: 1.73 m (5 ft 8 in)
- Position: Midfielder

Youth career
- 2001–2003: Toluca

Senior career*
Years	Team	Apps	(Gls)
2003–2012	Toluca Premier		
2006–2009	Atlético Mexiquense	38	(1)
2006–2012	Toluca	13	(0)
2010–2011	→ Altamira (loan)	10	(0)
2012–2013	Potros UAEM	21	(4)
2015–2018	Chicago Mustangs (indoor)	17	(8)

International career
- Mexico U20
- * Club domestic league appearances and goals as of 22 January 2022

Francisco "Paco" Javier González García (born 23 February 1988) is a Mexican footballer who plays as a midfielder.

== Club career ==
González joined Toluca's youth in 2001, staying until 2012 whilst featuring for various sides of the club in the Mexican football league system. He first appeared for Toluca Premier in the third tier at the age of fifteen. Since 2006, he has played for their first team in the Primera División, featuring in a defeat to San Luis on 13 September 2006. Across the 2006–07 campaign, González participated in five fixtures for Toluca. Also in that season, González featured for their reserves, Atlético Mexiquense of Primera División A, making his debut on 21 October 2006 against Real Colima. He scored against Veracruz in September 2008.

In total, he scored one goal in thirty-eight appearances for Atlético Mexiquense, over three years. González departed the club on loan in 2010 to play for Altamira. Ten appearances followed in Liga de Ascenso. In 2012, the midfielder left permanently and subsequently joined Potros UAEM. He scored in both his first and final appearances for Potros UAEM, against Atlas B and Cruz Azul Jasso. In 2016, González moved to the United States for a trial with Major Arena Soccer League side Chicago Mustangs; subsequently signing a contract with Armando Gamboa's indoor soccer team.

== International career ==
González represented the Mexico U20s early in his career.

== Career statistics ==
As of 25 December 2018.

Club statistics
Club	Season	League			Cup		League Cup		Continental		Other		Total	
Club	Season	Division	Apps	Goals	Apps	Goals	Apps	Goals	Apps	Goals	Apps	Goals	Apps	Goals
Atlético Mexiquense	2006–07	Primera División A	4	0	0	0	—		—		0	0	4	0
Atlético Mexiquense	2007–08	Primera División A	17	0	0	0	—		—		2 (Note: Two appearances in the 2007–08 Primera División A play-offs)	0	19	0
Atlético Mexiquense	2008–09	Primera División A	17	1	0	0	—		—		0	0	17	1
Atlético Mexiquense	Total		38	1	0	0	—		—		2	0	40	1
Toluca	2006–07	Primera División	5	0	0	0	—		—		0	0	5	0
Toluca	2007–08	Primera División	0	0	0	0	—		—		0	0	0	0
Toluca	2008–09	Primera División	0	0	0	0	—		—		1 (Note: One appearance in the 2009 InterLiga)	0	1	0
Toluca	2009–10	Primera División	0	0	0	0	—		—		0	0	0	0
Toluca	2010–11	Primera División	0	0	0	0	—		—		0	0	0	0
Toluca	2011–12	Primera División	8	0	0	0	—		—		0	0	8	0
Toluca	Total		13	0	0	0	—		—		1	0	14	0
Toluca Premier	2007–08	Segunda División	4	0	0	0	—		—		3 (Note: Three appearances in the 2007–08 Segunda División play-offs)	1 (Note: One goal in the 2007–08 Segunda División play-offs)	7	1
Toluca Premier	2008–09	Segunda División	0	0	0	0	—		—		4 (Note: Four appearances in the 2008–09 Segunda División play-offs)	0	4	0
Toluca Premier	Total		4	0	0	0	—		—		7	1	11	1
Altamira (loan)	2010–11	Liga de Ascenso	10	0	0	0	—		—		0	0	10	0
Potros UAEM	2012–13	Serie A	21	4	0	0	—		—		2 (Note: Two appearances in the 2012–13 Serie A de México play-offs)	0	23	4
Career total			86	5	0	0	—		—		10	1	96	6
