= Diego de la Torre =

Mexican footballer and coach (born 1984)

Personal information
- Full name: Diego Javier de la Torre Muciño
- Date of birth: 5 February 1984 (age 42)
- Place of birth: San Luis Potosí, Mexico
- Height: 1.79 m (5 ft 10 in)
- Position: Midfielder

Youth career
- 2003–2004: Atl. Mexiquense

Senior career*
Years	Team	Apps	(Gls)
2003–2004	Atl. Mexiquense	50	(8)
2004–2012	Toluca	288	(8)
2010–2011	→ San Luis (loan)	30	(2)
2012–2014	→ Querétaro (loan)	61	(8)
2014–2017	Chiapas	57	(5)
2017–2019	Cafetaleros de Tapachula	16	(1)

Managerial career
- 2018: Cafetaleros de Tapachula (interim player-manager)
- 2019: Cafetaleros de Chiapas (Interim)
- 2020: Cafetaleros de Chiapas
- 2021–2024: Atlanta United (assistant)
- 2025: Atlas (assistant)
- * Club domestic league appearances and goals

Diego Javier de la Torre Muciño (born 5 February 1984) is a Mexican former professional footballer who played as a midfielder and current assistant coach for Major League Soccer club Atlanta United FC. De la Torre also has American citizenship, as his paternal grandmother was born in the United States. After the Apertura 2009 season, Diego was sent on loan to San Luis F.C. for the Clausura 2010 season, after playing his whole career with Toluca.

== Honours ==
Cafetaleros de Tapachula

- Ascenso MX: Clausura 2018
