= Alfredo Talavera =

Mexican footballer (born 1982)

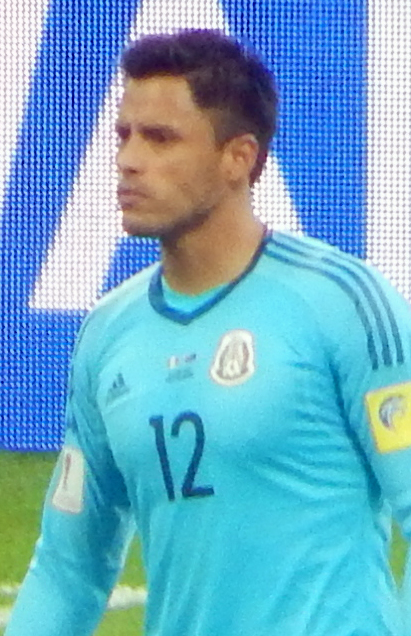
- Talavera with Mexico at the 2017 FIFA Confederations Cup

Personal information
- Full name: Alfredo Talavera Díaz
- Date of birth: 18 September 1982 (age 44)
- Place of birth: La Barca, Jalisco, Mexico
- Height: 1.88 m (6 ft 2 in)

Team information
- Current team: Mexico U23 (goalkeeper coach)

Youth career
- 1999: Pumas UNAM
- 2000–2003: Guadalajara

Senior career*
Years	Team	Apps	(Gls)
2003–2004	Tapatío	12	(0)
2004–2005	Chivas La Piedad	13	(0)
2005–2006	Chivas Coras Tepic	13	(0)
2006–2008	Tapatío	31	(0)
2003–2010	Guadalajara	21	(0)
2008–2009	→ Tigres UANL (loan)	2	(0)
2009–2010	→ Toluca (loan)	20	(0)
2010–2020	Toluca	346	(1)
2020–2022	Pumas UNAM	62	(0)
2022–2024	Juárez	52	(0)

International career
2016	Mexico Olympic (O.P.)	3	(0)
2011–2022	Mexico	40	(0)

Managerial career
- 2024–: Mexico U23 (goalkeeper coach)
Medal record
Men's football
Representing Mexico
CONCACAF Gold Cup
Winner	2011 United States
Runner-up	2021 United States
- * Club domestic league appearances and goals

Alfredo Talavera Díaz (Spanish pronunciation: [alˈfɾeðo talaˈβeɾa]; born 18 September 1982) is a Mexican professional football coach and former goalkeeper. He currently serves as the goalkeeper coach for the Mexico under-23 national team.

Starting his career with Guadalajara in 2003, it was during his final years with the team that he would be loaned out to Tigres UANL and Toluca, with the latter deciding to purchase him in 2010. He would join Club Universidad Nacional in 2020 and Juárez in 2022.

Talavera made his debut with the national team in March 2011. Originally Mexico's third-choice goalkeeper for the 2011 CONCACAF Gold Cup, he became the team's starting goalkeeper following issues with the first and second-choice goalkeepers, in which Mexico would ultimately win. He would go on to be called up for the 2013 CONCACAF Gold Cup, 2013 and 2017 FIFA Confederations Cup, the 2014, 2018 and 2022 FIFA World Cup, the 2015 Copa América, the Copa América Centenario, and 2016 Summer Olympics.

== Club career ==
=== Guadalajara ===
With Oswaldo Sánchez out during the first part of the Clausura 2005 with a shoulder injury, Talavera entered the Guadalajara team as a starter against teams from the Primera División de México, and also coming through against South American teams in the Copa Libertadores.

On 2 April 2006, Sanchez left temporarily to play with the Mexico national team for the 2006 FIFA World Cup in Germany, leaving Talavera in goal. Since then he has started six Clausura 2006 games for Guadalajara. In the first game he started the club posted a 2–0 loss against Monarcas Morelia. This was followed by a loss to Atlas in the Clásico Tapatío. In the final game of the season, Guadalajara lost to Toluca, 2–0, but after a terrible performance in the first leg of the quarter-finals against Jaguares when he made a big mistake in injury time that caused the winning goal for Jaguares, coach José Manuel de la Torre dropped him as the starter and was replaced by Luis Ernesto Michel and Guadalajara fought back and advanced to the semifinals. The next season, when Oswaldo Sánchez returned, Talavera saw himself as the third goalkeeper of Guadalajara, with Michel as the second keeper, after Oswaldo left Guadalajara, Michel was the starting keeper and Talavera the backup. After this, he didn't have any action with Guadalajara again, taking the decision to leave the club in order to have more minutes played.

=== Tigres UANL ===
Guadalajara loaned Talavera to Tigres UANL on a one-year loan in 2008, in which he rarely saw action with the team, as he was competing with Óscar Pérez for the spot. Nevertheless, bad luck came for Talavera, as Talavera injured himself in training, making Enrique Palos the next in the line. After he had fully recovered, Alfredo was released from Tigres.

=== Toluca ===
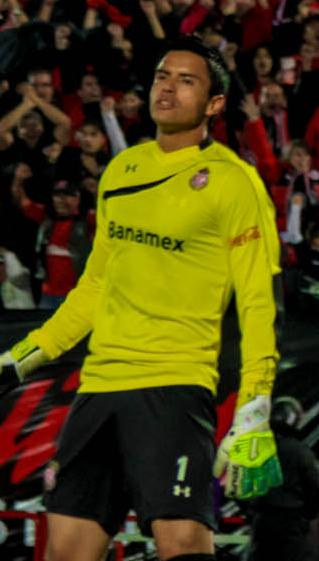
Talavera with Toluca in 2012

Talavera was transferred to Toluca as a substitute for first team goalkeeper Hernan Cristante, since he was injured for the Apertura 2009. On 26 July 2009, he made his league debut with Toluca playing against his former club Guadalajara in a 4–3 victory. He played as a starter in every game of the season as the team reached the championship semi-finals, losing to eventual championship winners Monterrey.

On 15 May 2010, Talavera made it to his first final as starter after defeating Pachuca 1–0 in the second leg of the 2010 Bicentenario championship semi-final (3–2 on aggregate). On 23 May, Talavera helped Toluca win the championship, defeating Santos Laguna in a penalty shoot-out 4–3 after stopping Fernando Arce's shot. His performances led him to win the tournament's Golden Glove award.

On 15 September 2013, in a league match against Puebla, Talavera scored a last-minute penalty, helping his team tie the match at 1–1, thus giving him his first goal in the Liga MX.

Despite losing the 2014 CONCACAF Champions League Final against Cruz Azul, Talavera won the Golden Glove award. His performances led him to be nominated to the 2014 CONCACAF Goalkeeper of the Year.

=== Pumas UNAM ===
Prior to the start of the 2020–21 season, Talavera joined Club Universidad Nacional in an exchange that saw Alfredo Saldívar join Toluca. On 26 July 2020, he made his league debut for Pumas U.N.A.M. in a 3–2 victory over Querétaro.

=== Juárez and retirement ===
On 8 June 2022, Talavera joined Juárez. On 10 May 2024, he left the club. On 12 October 2024, Talavera officially announced his retirement from professional football.

== International career ==
In January 2011, Talavera received his first call-up to the senior national team by José Manuel de la Torre for a friendly match against Bosnia and Herzegovina. He made his international team debut on 26 March 2011 in a friendly against Paraguay which El Tri won 3–1. He was called for the team's 2011 CONCACAF Gold Cup squad as a third choice goalkeeper after José de Jesús Corona and Guillermo Ochoa. Following Corona's Liguilla scandal with Cruz Azul and Ochoa's clenbuterol issue, Talavera became Mexico's first-choice goalkeeper, despite having only one international cap. Overall, he saw action in five matches of that tournament and was a starter in the final against United States, where Mexico would go on to win 4–2.

Talavera was named in the 23-man squad participating in the 2013 FIFA Confederations Cup held in Brazil, but did not appear in any of the group stage matches as Mexico failed to progress from the group stage. Following the conclusion of the tournament, Talavera was called up again to participate at the Gold Cup to replace injured goalkeeper Cirilo Saucedo.

On 2 June 2014, Talavera was included by Miguel Herrera to be in Mexico's 23-man squad for the 2014 FIFA World Cup in Brazil, but did not appear in any matches.

Talavera was included in the final roster that would participate at the 2015 Copa América, but made no appearances. With the arrival of then-manager Juan Carlos Osorio in October 2015, Talavera became Mexico's first-choice goalkeeper in various instances.

In May 2016, Talavera was included in the final roster to participate at the Copa América Centenario, making a single appearance in the opening group stage match against Uruguay, where Mexico won 3–1. On 7 July, Talavera was named in Mexico's 18-man squad that would participate in the Summer Olympics in Rio de Janeiro, Brazil, being one of the three over-aged players. Playing as Mexico's starting goalkeeper in the tournament, he was named captain following Oribe Peralta's injury. Mexico failed to make it past the group stage.

Talavera was included in the roster for the 2017 FIFA Confederations Cup in Russia, where he participated in the group stage 2–1 victory against New Zealand.

In May 2018, Talavera was named in Mexico's preliminary 28-man squad for the 2018 FIFA World Cup, and in June 2018, he was ultimately included in the final 23-man roster for the tournament, but did not receive any minutes on the field during the tournament.

In October 2022, Talavera was named in Mexico's preliminary 31-man squad for the 2022 FIFA World Cup, and in November, he was ultimately included in the final 26-man roster, but did not receive any minutes on the field during the tournament.

== Style of play ==
Spanish newspaper Marca described Talavera as the best out of the other 2018 FIFA World Cup Mexico goalkeepers in aerial game, someone who knows how to play with his feet (following an injury that left him out for various months), knows how to block penalties, and is able to block shots with stable hands, avoiding rebounded balls that could end up in the opposition.

Former Mexico national team coach, Juan Carlos Osorio, has said about Talavera that he has "an extraordinary aerial game. So we have a great goalkeeper for this particular style of game against teams who are direct and are excellent on set-pieces." In an interview with ESPN, former Mexico goalkeeper Oswaldo Sánchez spoke of Talavera as "I think that the most complete of [Talavera, Ochoa, and Corona] is Talavera, because he is a guy that has strong legs, is good in the air, plays well with his feet and has good reactions."

== Career statistics ==
As of 9 November 2022

Appearances and goals by national team and year
National team	Year	Apps	Goals
Mexico	2011	9	0
Mexico	2012	1	0
Mexico	2013	1	0
Mexico	2014	5	0
Mexico	2015	4	0
Mexico	2016	5	0
Mexico	2017	3	0
Mexico	2020	1	0
Mexico	2021	9	0
Mexico	2022	2	0
Total		40	0

== Honours ==
Guadalajara

- Mexican Primera División: Apertura 2006

Toluca

- Mexican Primera División: Bicentenario 2010

Mexico

- CONCACAF Gold Cup: 2011
- CONCACAF Cup: 2015

Individual

- Mexican Primera División Golden Glove: Bicentenario 2010
- CONCACAF Champions League Golden Glove: 2013–14
- Liga MX Best XI: Guardianes 2020
- Liga MX All-Star: 2021
- Liga MX Save of the Month: January 2020
- Premios Univision Deportes Liga MX Player of the Year: 2014
