= Néstor Calderón =

Mexican footballer (born 1989)

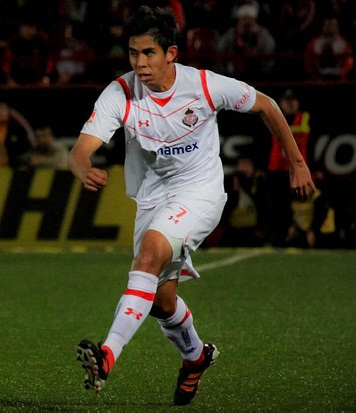
- Calderón playing for Toluca

Personal information
- Full name: Néstor Calderón Enríquez
- Date of birth: 14 February 1989 (age 37)
- Place of birth: Guadalajara, Jalisco, Mexico
- Height: 1.73 m (5 ft 8 in)
- Position: Winger

Youth career
- 2007–2008: Atlético Mexiquense

Senior career*
Years	Team	Apps	(Gls)
2008–2012	Toluca	136	(22)
2012	Pachuca	10	(0)
2013–2016	Santos Laguna	107	(15)
2016–2017	→ Guadalajara (loan)	29	(3)
2017–2018	→ UNAM (loan)	11	(0)
2018	Celaya	12	(0)
2019–2020	Salamanca	7	(0)
2020	Tiburón	0	(0)

International career^{‡}
2009	Mexico U20	3	(0)
2011–2012	Mexico U23	8	(0)
2009–2012	Mexico	4	(0)
Medal record
Men's football
Representing Mexico
Olympic Qualifying Championship
Winner	2012 United States
Toulon Tournament
Winner	2012 France	Team
- * Club domestic league appearances and goals as of 30 August 2020 ‡ National team caps and goals as of 25 January 2012

Néstor Calderón Enríquez (born 14 February 1989), also known as el Avión (the Plane), is a Mexican former professional footballer who last played as a winger.

== Club career ==
He was spotted and brought by José Manuel de la Torre from the youth squads of Rayados to Atlético Mexiquense, and from there was promoted to the first Toluca squad due to his great performance. Starting almost every game.

== International career ==
Then Mexico national team coach Javier Aguirre in September 2009 called him to train with Mexico for the World Cup Qualifiers against Costa Rica and Honduras and later gave him his international debut in a friendly against Colombia in the United States.

== Career statistics ==
=== International ===
As of match played 26 January 2012

National team	Year	Apps	Goals
Mexico	2009	1	0
Mexico	2011	2	0
Mexico	2012	1	0
Total		4	0

== Honours ==
Toluca

- Mexican Primera División: Apertura 2008, Bicentenario 2010

Santos Laguna

- Liga MX: Clausura 2015
- Copa MX: Apertura 2014
- Campeón de Campeones: 2015

Guadalajara

- Liga MX: Clausura 2017
- Copa MX: Clausura 2017
- Supercopa MX: 2016

Mexico U23

- CONCACAF Olympic Qualifying Championship: 2012
- Toulon Tournament: 2012

Individual

- Tecate Premios Deportes Best Rookie: 2009
- Tecate Premios Deportes Best XI: 2009
- Mexican Primera División Best Rookie: Apertura 2008
- Liga MX Best XI: Clausura 2015
