= Isaác Brizuela =

Mexican footballer (born 1990)

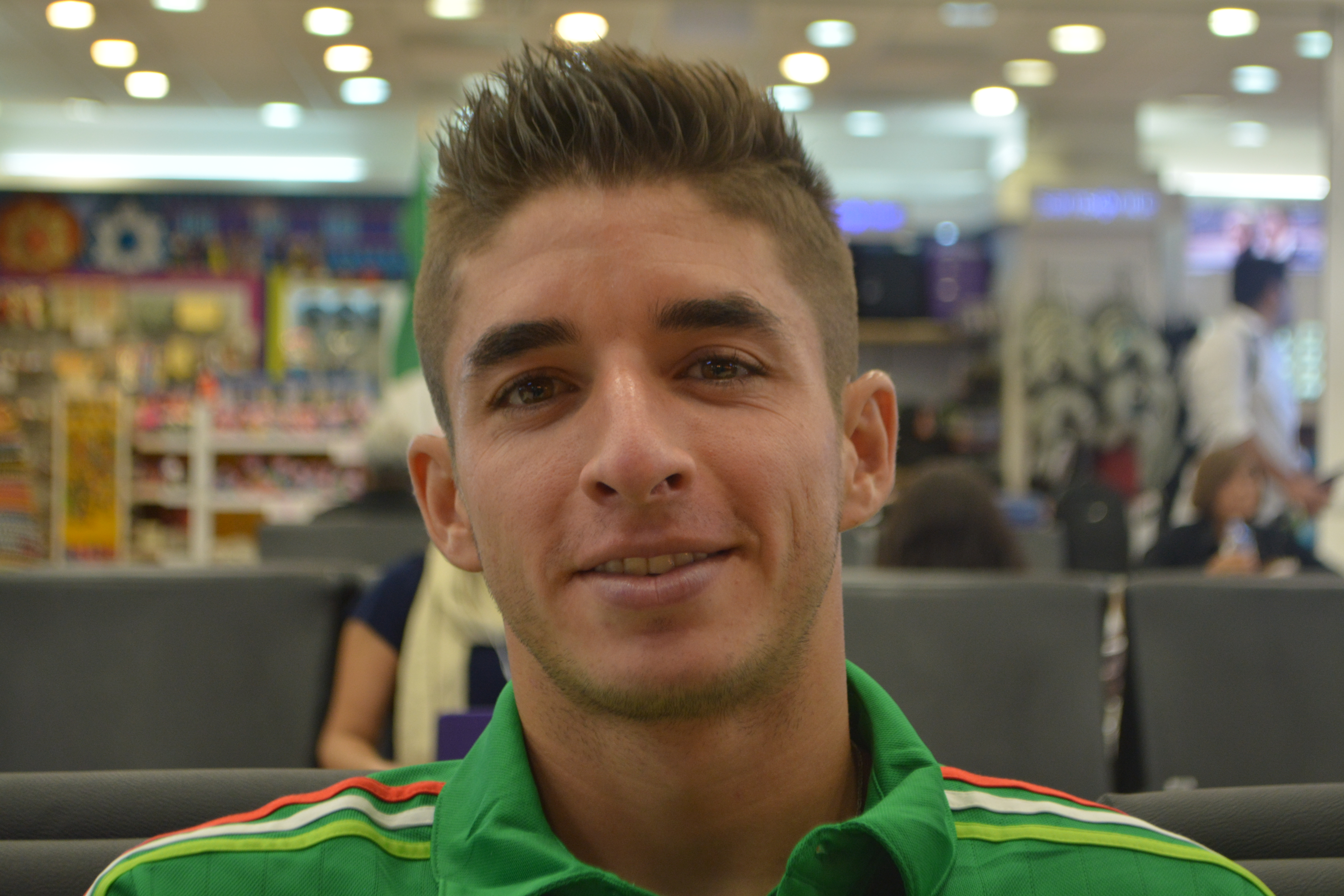
- Brizuela in 2016

Personal information
- Full name: Isaác Brizuela Muñoz
- Date of birth: 28 August 1990 (age 36)
- Place of birth: San Jose, California, United States
- Height: 1.71 m (5 ft 7 in)
- Position: Winger

Youth career
- 2007–2009: Toluca

Senior career*
Years	Team	Apps	(Gls)
2008–2009	Atlético Mexiquense	23	(2)
2009–2014	Toluca	150	(13)
2013	→ Atlas (loan)	18	(2)
2015–2025	Guadalajara	290	(21)

International career
2011–2012	Mexico U23	6	(0)
2013–2019	Mexico	14	(0)
Medal record
Representing Mexico
Pan American Games
Gold medal – first place	2011 Guadalajara	Team competition
- * Club domestic league appearances and goals as of 27 September 2025

Isaác Brizuela Muñoz (Spanish pronunciation: [iˈsa(a)k βɾiˈswela]; born 28 August 1990), also known as El Conejo, is a former professional footballer who played as a winger. Born in the United States, he represented the Mexico national team.

== Early life ==
Brizuela was born in the United States to Mexican parents who were working in California at the time. When he was two years old, his family returned to their hometown of Lagos de Moreno, in the state of Jalisco. It was while playing football there that he was scouted by Toluca. In June 2009, he was promoted to the senior squad following impressive performances with the club's reserve team, Atlético Mexiquense.

== Club career ==
Brizuela made his professional debut with Toluca on 26 July 2009, in a league match against Guadalajara. The following year, he won his first professional title, the 2010 Bicentenario. In January 2013, Brizuela was loaned to Atlas for a period of six months. After his time at Atlas, José Cardozo brought him back to Toluca, where he became a regular starter.

In December 2014, Guadalajara secured the signing of Brizuela. Over the next decade, he became a key figure for the club, helping them capture five titles, including the Clausura 2017 championship and the 2018 CONCACAF Champions League trophy.

== International career ==
In May 2013, Brizuela revealed that he was born in San Jose, California, to Mexican parents even though he had initially reported to the FMF (Mexican Football Federation) that he was born in Lagos de Moreno, Jalisco. Therefore, he was eligible to play for either the United States and Mexico. Mexico head coach José Manuel de la Torre listed Brizuela in Mexico's 35-man preliminary squad for the Gold Cup due to his good performances with Atlas. He was subsequently included in the final 23-player squad. Brizuela made his first competitive appearance for Mexico with the senior squad in a 2013 CONCACAF Gold Cup match against Panama that also, given his dual US-Mexican citizenship, cap-tied him to Mexico. He was included in Miguel Herrera 23-man world cup squad, but didn't appear in any matches.

== Career statistics ==
=== International ===
As of match played 27 March 2019

National team	Year	Apps	Goals
Mexico	2013	3	0
Mexico	2014	4	0
Mexico	2016	2	0
Mexico	2018	4	0
Mexico	2019	1	0
Total		14	0

== Honours ==
Toluca

- Mexican Primera División: Bicentenario 2010

Guadalajara

- Liga MX: Clausura 2017
- Copa MX: Apertura 2015, Clausura 2017
- Supercopa MX: 2016
- CONCACAF Champions League: 2018

Mexico U23

- Pan American Games: 2011

Individual

- CONCACAF Champions League Best XI: 2018
