= Carlos Esquivel =

Mexican footballer (born 1982)

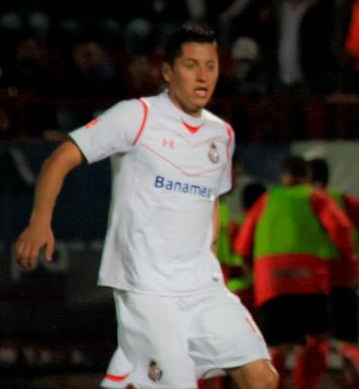
- Esquivel playing for Toluca

Personal information
- Full name: Carlos Esquivel Silva
- Date of birth: 10 April 1982 (age 44)
- Place of birth: Tlalpujahua, Michoacán, Mexico
- Height: 1.72 m (5 ft 7 1/2 in)
- Position: Winger

Team information
- Current team: Toluca U-19 (Assistant)

Senior career*
Years	Team	Apps	(Gls)
2003–2005	Atlético Mexiquense	54	(4)
2005–2019	Toluca	423	(43)
2008	→ Tigres UANL (loan)	11	(2)
2008	→ Tigres B (loan)	3	(1)
2018	→ Veracruz (loan)	28	(2)
2019	→ UAEM (loan)	6	(0)
Total		524	(52)

International career
2008–2015	Mexico	19	(1)

Managerial career
- 2021–: Toluca Reserves and Academy
Medal record
Representing Mexico
CONCACAF Gold Cup
Winner	CONCACAF Gold Cup	2009
Winner	2015 CONCACAF Gold Cup	2015
- * Club domestic league appearances and goals

Carlos Esquivel Silva (born 10 April 1982) is a Mexican former professional footballer who played as a winger.

== Club career ==
Esquivel uprooted through the younger divisions of Toluca, and debuted in Apertura 2005 with then coach Américo Gallego. That season precisely Toluca became champions. Esquivel stayed there until Clausura 2008 when Esquivel was sent on loan to Tigres UANL for that one season. He returned to Toluca afterwards.

On 13 December 2017, Esquivel was loaned to Veracruz in a 6-month deal.

In June 2019, Esquivel joined UAEM of Ascenso MX.

== International career ==
Esquivel made four appearances for the Mexico national team in the 2009 CONCACAF Gold Cup where Mexico won its fifth title.

== Career statistics ==
=== International ===
As of match played 14 October 2015

National team	Year	Apps	Goals
Mexico	2008	1	0
Mexico	2009	7	0
Mexico	2015	11	1
Total		19	1

=== International goals ===
Scores and results list Mexico's goal tally first.

Goal	Date	Venue	Opponent	Score	Result	Competition
1.	4 September 2015.	Rio Tinto Stadium, Sandy, United States	Trinidad and Tobago	1–2	3–3	Friendly

== Honours ==
Toluca

- Mexican Primera División: Apertura 2005, Apertura 2008, Bicentenario 2010

Mexico

- CONCACAF Gold Cup: 2009, 2015
- CONCACAF Cup: 2015
