= Édgar Dueñas =

Mexican footballer (born 1983)

Edgar Dueñas
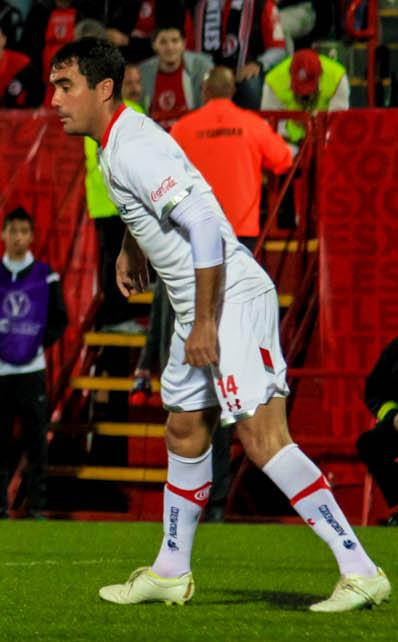
- Dueñas playing for Toluca

Personal information
- Full name: Edgar Esteban Dueñas Peñaflor
- Date of birth: 5 March 1983 (age 43)
- Place of birth: Guadalajara, Jalisco, Mexico
- Height: 1.85 m (6 ft 1 in)
- Position: Defender

Team information
- Current team: Toluca (women) (Manager)

Youth career
- Toluca

Senior career*
Years	Team	Apps	(Gls)
2003	Cihuatlán	5	(0)
2003–2007	Atlético Mexiquense	21	(1)
2004–2015	Toluca	313	(15)
2014–2015	→ Chiapas (loan)	27	(0)
2016–2017	Puebla	19	(2)
2017	Potros UAEM	10	(0)
Total		395	(18)

International career
2006–2012	Mexico	10	(0)

Managerial career
- 2018: CDH
- 2018–2019: CDH (Assistant)
- 2019–2020: Cafetaleros de Chiapas (Assistant)
- 2022–2024: Toluca Reserves and Academy
- 2024: Puebla (Assistant)
- 2026–: Toluca (women)
Medal record
Representing Mexico
CONCACAF Gold Cup
Winner	CONCACAF Gold Cup	2009
- * Club domestic league appearances and goals

Edgar Esteban Dueñas Peñaflor (born 5 March 1983) is a Mexican former professional footballer who played as a defender.

== International career ==
During the 2011 CONCACAF Gold Cup, Dueñas, and four other members of the Mexico national team, tested positive for the banned substance of Clenbuterol and were withdrawn from the squad. Later, all players were exonerated as FIFA determined that the accused had ingested the banned substance through contaminated meat that had been inadvertently served during a pre-tournament training camp.

However, World Anti-Doping Agency appealed to the Court of Arbitration for Sport to request a ban. On 12 October 2011 the request was withdrawn when the full record was made available to WADA.

== Career statistics ==
=== International ===
As of match played 26 January 2012

National team	Year	Apps	Goals
Mexico	2006	1	0
Mexico	2008	1	0
Mexico	2009	3	0
Mexico	2010	1	0
Mexico	2011	3	0
Mexico	2012	1	0
Total		10	0

== Honours ==
Toluca

- Primera División de México: Apertura 2005, Apertura 2008, Bicentenario 2010

Mexico

- CONCACAF Gold Cup: 2009

Individual

- Primera División de México Center back of the tournament: Bicentenario 2010
