= Francisco Gamboa (footballer) =

Mexican footballer (born 1985)

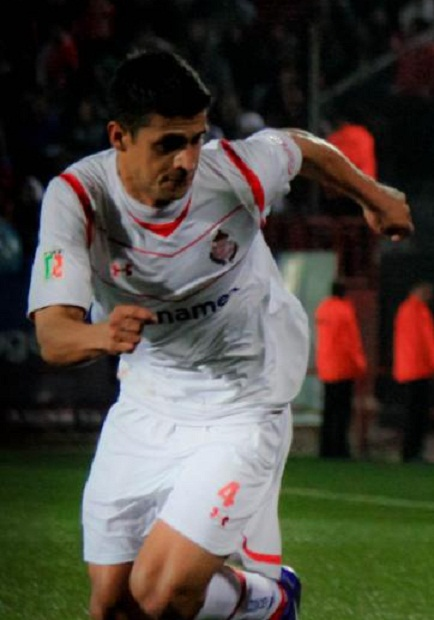
- Gamboa playing for Toluca

Personal information
- Full name: Francisco Gamboa Gómez
- Date of birth: July 20, 1985 (age 41)
- Place of birth: Guadalajara, Jalisco, Mexico
- Height: 1.79 m (5 ft 10 in)
- Position: Defender

Team information
- Current team: Toluca U-21 (Assistant)

Senior career*
Years	Team	Apps	(Gls)
2005–2016	Toluca	138	(0)
2017–2018	→ Atlante (loan)	26	(0)
Total		164	(0)

International career
2008	Mexico U23	6	(0)

Managerial career
- 2021–2022: Toluca Reserves and Academy
- 2023–2025: Toluca (Assistant)
- 2025–: Toluca Reserves and Academy
- * Club domestic league appearances and goals

Francisco Gamboa Gómez (born 20 July 1985) is a Mexican former professional footballer. He last played as a defender for Atlante, wearing jersey #4. He made his debut September 25, 2005 against UAG, a game which resulted in a 2–1 victory for Toluca.

== Honours ==
Toluca

- Primera División de México: Apertura 2005, Apertura 2008, Bicentenario 2010
