= Miguel Centeno (footballer) =

Mexican footballer (born 1989)

Personal information
- Full name: Miguel Ángel Centeno Báez
- Date of birth: 16 August 1989 (age 37)
- Place of birth: Toluca, State of Mexico, Mexico
- Height: 1.80 m (5 ft 11 in)
- Position: Goalkeeper

Team information
- Current team: Toluca U-16 (Goalkeeping coach)

Youth career
- 2006–2009: Atlético Mexiquense

Senior career*
Years	Team	Apps	(Gls)
2009–2018	Toluca	8	(0)
2017	→ Correcaminos (loan)	4	(0)

Managerial career
- 2020: Cafetaleros de Chiapas (Goalkeeping coach)
- 2022–: Toluca Reserves and Academy
- * Club domestic league appearances and goals as of 21 September 2017

Miguel Ángel Centeno Báez (Note: In this Spanish name, the first or paternal surname is Centeno and the second or maternal family name is Báez.) (born 16 August 1989), is a former Mexican football goalkeeper who played for Liga MX squad Deportivo Toluca.

== Club career ==
Centeno started his career in Deportivo Toluca's filial, Atlético Mexiquense. On 2009, Centeno was promoted to the first team of Deportivo Toluca.

Preview to the Clausura 2017, Centeno was loaned out to Ascenso MX side Correcaminos UAT.
