= Martín Romagnoli =

Argentine footballer

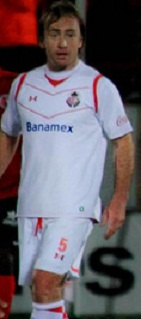
- Romagnoli playing for Toluca

Personal information
- Full name: Martín Andrés Romagnoli
- Date of birth: September 30, 1977 (age 49)
- Place of birth: Leones, Argentina
- Height: 1.70 m (5 ft 7 in)
- Position: Midfielder

Youth career
- 1993–1994: All Boys

Senior career*
Years	Team	Apps	(Gls)
1994–1998	All Boys	53	(1)
1998–1999	CD Badajoz	10	(0)
1999–2006	Colón	179	(4)
2006	Quilmes	18	(0)
2007	Racing Club	34	(1)
2008–2012	Toluca	169	(1)
2012–2015	UNAM	79	(0)
2015	Atlante	12	(0)
Total		554	(7)

International career
2005	Argentina	1	(0)
- * Club domestic league appearances and goals

Martín Andrés Romagnoli (born 30 September 1977 in Leones, Córdoba) is an Argentine former professional footballer who played as a midfielder.

== Career ==
Romagnoli started his career in the 2nd Division with All Boys. In 1998-1999 he spent a season with Spanish team CD Badajoz.

In 1999, he returned to Argentina to play for Colón de Santa Fe where he played until 2006. In his time at Colón he made 178 appearances for the club.

In 2006, he moved to Quilmes Atlético Club but after a disastrous Apertura where Quilmes finished bottom of the league with only 9 points from 19 games he left Quilmes to join Racing Club.

In 2008, Romagnoli was brought to Toluca a couple of days after the Mexican League had started due to the trade of Ariel Rosada to Celta Vigo.

On 26 May 2012 Romagnoli was loaned to UNAM.

Romagnoli retired from professional football in 2015.

== Honours ==
=== Club ===
Toluca

- Primera División de México: Apertura 2008, Bicentenario 2010

=== Individual ===
- Mexican Primera División Best Defensive Midfielder: Bicentenario 2010
