= Sinha (footballer) =

Professional footballer (born 1976)

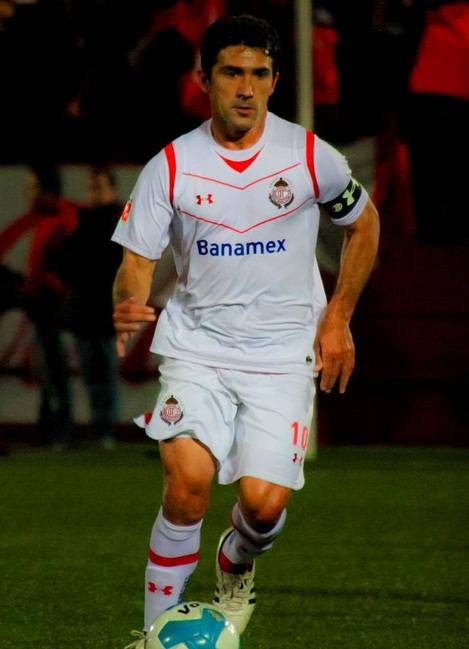
- Sinha playing for Toluca

Personal information
- Full name: Antônio Naelson Matias
- Date of birth: 23 May 1976 (age 50)
- Place of birth: Itajá, Rio Grande do Norte, Brazil
- Height: 1.63 m (5 ft 4 in)
- Position: Attacking midfielder

Youth career
- 1985–1993: América-RN

Senior career*
Years	Team	Apps	(Gls)
1998–1999	Saltillo Soccer	35	(1)
1999	Monterrey	17	(1)
1999–2017	Toluca	524	(61)
2014–2016	→ Querétaro (loan)	48	(1)
Total		624	(64)

International career
2004	Mexico Olympic	3	(0)
2004–2013	Mexico	59	(6)
- * Club domestic league appearances and goals

Antônio Naelson Matias (born 23 May 1976), known as Sinha or Zinha, is a former professional footballer who played as an attacking midfielder. Born in Brazil, he played for the Mexico national team. He is regarded as one of the best playmakers to have played in Mexican football.

Sinha spent the majority of his career at Toluca, where he won five Primera División titles and played over 500 matches, making him to this day the player with the most appearances in the club's history.

== Club career ==
Sinha was born in Itajá, a city located in the northwest of the Brazilian state of Rio Grande do Norte. He began his career playing for Rio Grande do Norte's capital city team América FC.

Sinha arrived in 1998 to Mexico, when he joined CF Monterrey. In 1999, he moved to Toluca. Sinha is widely known for his dribbling skills, his accurate passing and his intelligence on the pitch as well as his leadership and long distance shot.

On February 12, 2017, Sinha achieved 600 official caps (including cup matches) with Toluca. This coincided with Toluca's 100 year anniversary.

On April 30, 2017, Sinha was given a brief ceremony at the Estadio Nemesio Diez during the last home regular season game for Toluca.

== International career ==
He was part of the Mexican 2004 Olympic football team, who exited in the first round, having finished third in group A, below group winners Mali and South Korea.

He has also been called up to play for Mexico, although he is a Brazilian-born player, he became a naturalized Mexican citizen, after settling in Mexico for several years. During the 2006 FIFA World Cup in Germany, Sinha became the first foreign-born player to score a goal for Mexico in a World Cup tournament, scoring against Iran. He was called up to play again for Mexico, thus making him the first naturalized to be called up by Hugo Sánchez.

In 2005, he played in the Confederations Cup scoring a goal against Japan that helped Mexico win the match. Mexico finished in fourth place in the tournament. He was also called up for the national team to play in the Gold Cup.

During the 2011 CONCACAF Gold Cup, Sinha, and four other members of the Mexico national team tested positive for the banned substance of Clenbuterol and were removed from the team's tournament squad. However, all players were exonerated as FIFA determined that the accused had accidentally ingested the banned substance through contaminated meat that had been served during a pre-tournament training camp.

However, World Anti-Doping Agency appealed to the Court of Arbitration for Sport to request a ban. But on 12 October 2011 WADA withdrew this request after the full file was available for them.

His final competitive match would come during a difficult time for the Mexico national team, as they barely qualified for the World Cup playoff against New Zealand. Miguel Herrera found it necessary to only call up Liga MX players thus including the veteran Sinha on his roster. Sinha would sub in during both legs of the play-offs as Mexico successfully advanced to the 2014 FIFA World Cup.

== Career statistics ==
=== International ===
As of match played 20 November 2013

National team	Year	Apps	Goals
Mexico	2004	5	1
Mexico	2005	21	3
Mexico	2006	10	1
Mexico	2008	10	1
Mexico	2009	3	0
Mexico	2011	6	0
Mexico	2012	1	0
Mexico	2013	3	0
Total		59	6

=== International goals ===
Scores and results list Mexico's goal tally first.

No.	Date	Venue	Opponent	Score	Result	Competition
1.	October 13, 2004	Estadio Cuauhtémoc, Puebla, Mexico	Trinidad and Tobago	1–0	3–0	2006 FIFA World Cup qualification
2.	March 27, 2005	Estadio Azteca, Mexico City, Mexico	United States	2–0	2–1	2006 FIFA World Cup qualification
3.	June 4, 2005	Estadio Mateo Flores, Guatemala City, Guatemala	Guatemala	1–0	2–0	2006 FIFA World Cup qualification
4.	June 16, 2005	AWD-Arena, Hanover, Germany	Japan	1–1	2–1	2005 FIFA Confederations Cup
5.	June 11, 2006	Frankenstadion, Nuremberg, Germany	Iran	3–1	3–1	2006 FIFA World Cup
6.	June 4, 2008	Qualcomm Stadium, San Diego, United States	Argentina	1–3	1–4	Friendly

== Honours ==
Toluca

- Mexican Primera División: Verano 2000, Apertura 2002, Apertura 2005, Apertura 2008, Bicentenario 2010
- Campeón de Campeones: 2003, 2006
- CONCACAF Champions' Cup: 2003

Individual

- FIFA Confederations Cup Best Goal: 2005
- Mexican Primera División Best Attacking Midfielder: Apertura 2008, Bicentenario 2010
- Mexican Primera División Golden Ball: Apertura 2008, Bicentenario 2010
