= Diego Novaretti =

Argentine footballer

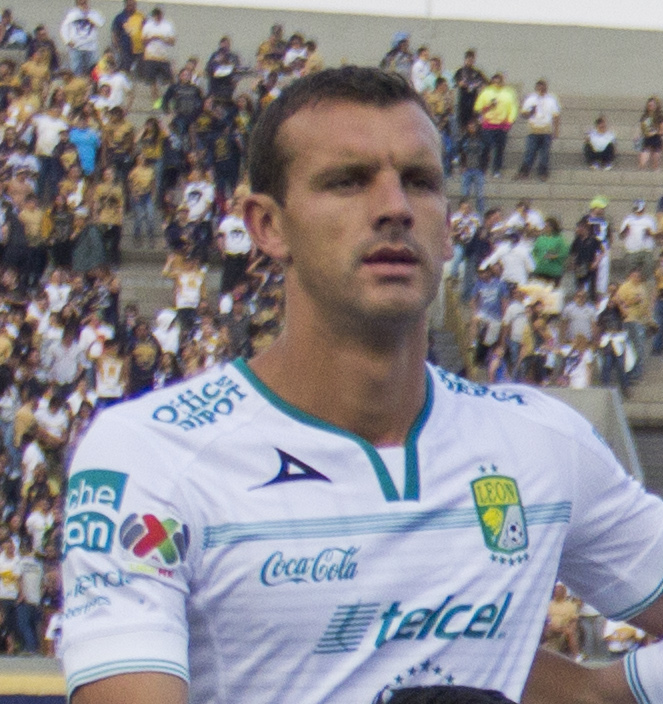
- Novaretti with León in 2016

Personal information
- Full name: Diego Martín Novaretti
- Date of birth: 9 May 1985 (age 41)
- Place of birth: La Palestina, Argentina
- Height: 1.93 m (6 ft 4 in)
- Position: Centre-back

Youth career
- Belgrano

Senior career*
Years	Team	Apps	(Gls)
2003–2009	Belgrano	113	(7)
2009–2013	Toluca	138	(8)
2013–2015	Lazio	16	(0)
2015–2018	León	58	(2)
2018	→ Querétaro (loan)	17	(1)
2018–2019	León	19	(0)
2019–2021	Rosario Central	28	(1)
2021–2023	Belgrano	68	(1)
- * Club domestic league appearances and goals

Diego Martín Novaretti (born 9 May 1985), sometimes known as El Flaco, is an Argentine former footballer who played as a centre-back.

== Club career ==
=== Club Atlético Belgrano ===
He made his professional debut with Club Atlético Belgrano in 2006. Novaretti is known for his height and quickness.

=== Toluca ===
It was rumoured that Novaretti might join Deportivo Toluca since the departure of Paulo da Silva, and José Manuel de la Torre expressed a great interest in acquiring him for the team. On 22 July 2009, it became official that Novaretti was to join Toluca. But currently he won't play as he escaped from his last club without paying anything for the transfer. He made his debut on 6 September 2009 against Morelia. He played the whole 90 minutes. A game that finished 1–0 For Toluca. He scored his first goal for Toluca on 4 April 2010 against Estudiantes Tecos. A game that finished 5–0 for Toluca.

=== S.S. Lazio ===
In the summer of 2013, Novaretti arrived as a free agent joining Lazio from Toluca. Novaretti signed a 4-year deal at the club. Novaretti was originally targeted by Manchester City, but their interest waned after Roberto Mancini was relieved of his duties.

He made his debut for Lazio in Serie A on 25 August 2013 in Lazio's 2–1 win against Udinese. While 19 September 2013, Novaretti made his debut in the UEFA Europa League, against Legia Warsaw; Novaretti replaced Keita Baldé as a substitute. In his first season Novaretti made 17 appearances in all competitions during the 2013–14 season for Lazio.

== Honours ==
Toluca

- Liga MX: Bicentenario 2010
