= Antonio Ríos =

Mexican footballer (born 1988)

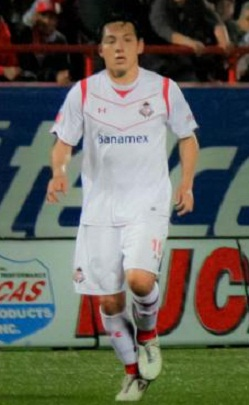
- Ríos playing for Toluca

Personal information
- Full name: Antonio Ríos Martínez
- Date of birth: 24 October 1988 (age 38)
- Place of birth: Arcelia, Guerrero, Mexico
- Height: 1.72 m (5 ft 7 1/2 in)
- Position: Defensive midfielder

Senior career*
Years	Team	Apps	(Gls)
2008–2009	Atlético Mexiquense	23	(1)
2009–2021	Toluca	367	(14)

International career
2010–2015	Mexico	8	(0)
Medal record
Men's football
Representing Mexico
CONCACAF Gold Cup
Winner	2015 United States–Canada	Team
- * Club domestic league appearances and goals as of 25 October 2021

Antonio Ríos Martínez (born 24 October 1988) is a Mexican professional footballer who plays as a defensive midfielder.

== Clausura 2009 Debut ==
Antonio Rios made his debut with Toluca against Atlante which was the first game of the season for Toluca FC. He only played 2 games the entire season; both games he played, he was used as a substitute. Toluca was 2nd place in the season of the Mexican League. Toluca lost in the quarter-finals to Indios, losing the first game 1-0 and tying the second leg 0-0(1–0) global.

== Career statistics ==
As of match played on 25 October 2021

Appearances and goals by club, season and competition
Club	Season	League			Cup		League Cup		Other		Total	
Club	Season	Division	Apps	Goals	Apps	Goals	Apps	Goals	Apps	Goals	Apps	Goals
Atletico Mexiquense	2008–09	Primera División A	23	1	—		—		—		23	1
Toluca	2008	Primera División de México	2	0	—		—		—		2	0
Toluca	2009–10	Mexican Primera División	21	2	—		—		11	1	32	3
Toluca	2010–11	Mexican Primera División	28	2	—		—		4	0	32	2
Toluca	2011–12	Mexican Primera División	32	1	—		—		—		32	1
Toluca	2012–13	Liga MX	33	2	5	0	—		3	0	41	2
Toluca	2013–14	Liga MX	33	1	—		—		8	0	41	1
Toluca	2014–15	Liga MX	37	1	2	0	—		—		39	1
Toluca	2015–16	Liga MX	35	1	3	0	—		7	0	45	1
Toluca	2016–17	Liga MX	35	1	3	0	—		—		38	1
Toluca	2017–18	Liga MX	40	1	4	0	—		—		44	1
Toluca	2018–19	Liga MX	33	2	1	0	—		2	0	36	0
Toluca	2019–20	Liga MX	14	0	4	0	—		—		18	0
Toluca	2020–21	Liga MX	19	0	—		—		—		19	0
Toluca	2021–22	Liga MX	5	0	—		—		—		5	0
Toluca	Total		367	14	22	0	—		35	1	424	15
Career totals			390	15	22	0	—		35	1	447	16

== International career ==
National team	Year	Apps	Goals
Mexico	2010	2	0
Mexico	2014	4	0
Mexico	2015	2	0
Total		8	0

== Honours ==
Toluca

- Mexican Primera División: Apertura 2008, Bicentenario 2010

Mexico

- CONCACAF Gold Cup: 2015

Individual

- Best Rookie of the tournament: Bicentenario 2010
