= Fernando Arce =

Mexican footballer (born 1980)

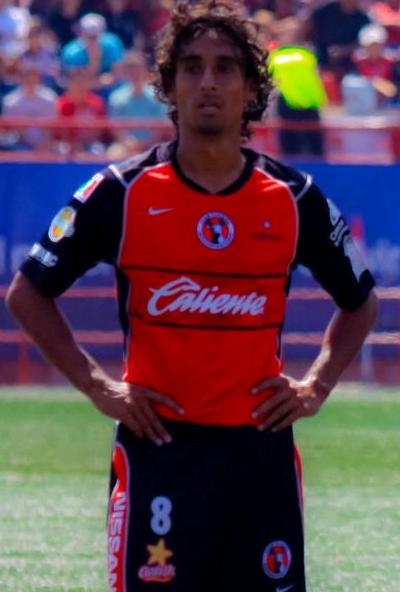
- Arce playing Tijuana

Personal information
- Full name: Fernando Enrique Arce Ruiz
- Date of birth: 24 April 1980 (age 46)
- Place of birth: Tijuana, Baja California, Mexico
- Height: 1.73 m (5 ft 8 in)
- Position: Midfielder

Youth career
- América

Senior career*
Years	Team	Apps	(Gls)
2000–2001	Irapuato	21	(2)
2002–2003	Veracruz	60	(8)
2003–2004	Atlante	40	(7)
2004–2007	Morelia	122	(24)
2008–2011	Santos Laguna	127	(14)
2011–2014	Tijuana	95	(6)
2014–2016	Guadalajara	25	(3)
2015–2016	→ Sinaloa (loan)	22	(0)

International career
1997	Mexico U17	3	(1)
2003–2013	Mexico	47	(7)

Managerial career
- 2016–2024: Tijuana Reserves
Medal record
Representing Mexico
Runner-up	CONCACAF Gold Cup	2007
Third place	Copa America	2007
- * Club domestic league appearances and goals

Fernando Enrique Arce Ruiz (born 24 April 1980) is a Mexican former professional footballer who played as a midfielder.

== Club career ==
Arce came out of Club América's youth prospects, but never debuted there. Arce debuted for Irapuato in a game against Toluca on 28 October 2000. Arce played the last eleven minutes and helped preserve the 3–2 win over the Choriceros. After being relegated to the bench for most of his first year at Irapuato, Arce's breakout season in 2001 in which he scored two goals and had five assists helped garner attention from other teams. Prior to the Primera División de México Clausura 2002, Arce was transferred to Veracruz, where he remained until the following year. At Veracruz, he scored 8 goals while also dishing out 4 assists, asserting himself as one of the top scoring midfielders in the league. He was part of a Veracruz team that reached the league playoff semifinals in his last season at the club. Selección de fútbol de México (Mexico national team) Despite his success at Veracruz, the team decided let him go, and Fernando was transferred to Atlante before the Apertura 2003 season. In his lone year with the Potros, he scored seven goals and had seven assists, while playing in 40 games - all but one in which he played in its entirety. After the Clausura 2004 season in which he helped Atlante reach the quarterfinals, Arce was once again transferred, this time to Morelia.

At Morelia, Arce consolidated himself as a team leader, helping the team reach the semifinals during the Clausura 2005 season, while anchoring the midfield with three goals and two assists.

Before the Clausura 2008, Arce moved to Santos Laguna

For the Apertura 2011 he signed for newly promoted side Club Tijuana, right in his hometown. He won the Apertura 2012 title with Xolos.

He scored his first goal in the 2013 Copa Libertadores with a volley and the team went on to win 0–2 against Palmeiras.

On 23 December 2013, in a friendly match against Club America he was substituted out and his son Fernando Arce Juárez, came in as his replacement.

On 25 May 2014, Guadalajara announced Arce as their second signing for the season.

== International career ==
Arce has also made numerous appearances for the Selección de fútbol de México (Mexico national team) under the tutelage of former head coach Ricardo LaVolpe, Hugo Sánchez and former head coach Jose Manuel de la Torre. Against Peru on 8 June 2008, Arce scored two goals, his first multi-scoring game with the national team. Against Belize on 21 June 2008 he again scored more than once in a game with the national team.

== Career statistics ==
=== International goals ===
No.	Date	Venue	Opponent	Score	Result	Competition	Ref.
1.	February 28, 2007	Qualcomm Stadium, San Diego, United States	Venezuela	2–0	3–1	Friendly	
2.	July 8, 2007	Estadio Monumental de Maturín, Maturín, Venezuela	Paraguay	4–0	6–0	2007 Copa América	
3.	June 8, 2008	Soldier Field, Chicago, United States	Peru	1–0	4–0	Friendly	
4.	June 8, 2008	Soldier Field, Chicago, United States	Peru	4–0	4–0	Friendly	
5.	June 21, 2008	Estadio Universitario, San Nicolás de los Garza, Mexico	Belize	4–0	7–0	2010 FIFA World Cup qualification	
6.	June 21, 2008	Estadio Universitario, San Nicolás de los Garza, Mexico	Belize	5–0	7–0	2010 FIFA World Cup qualification	
7.	September 6, 2008	Estadio Azteca, Mexico City, Mexico	Jamaica	2–0	3–0	2010 FIFA World Cup qualification	

== Personal life ==
Arce's son, Fernando Arce Jr., plays for Liga MX team Toluca.

== Honours ==
Santos Laguna

- Mexican Primera División: Clausura 2008

Tijuana

- Liga MX: Apertura 2012

Individual

- Mexican Primera División Best Attacking Midfielder: Clausura 2007
