= Toluca FC Reserves and Academy =

Toluca FC
- Full name: Deportivo Toluca Fútbol Club S.A. de C.V.
- Nicknames: Diablos Rojos (Red Devils); Los Escarlatas (The Scarlets); Los Choriceros (The Sausage Makers)
- Short name: TOL
- Website: tolucafc.com
Home colours	Away colours	Third colours

Toluca FC Reserves and Academy encompasses the reserve and youth teams of Mexican professional football club Toluca FC.

== Atlético Mexiquense ==
Atlético Mexiquense, also known as El Mexiquense and Los Pingos, was an affiliate club of Toluca that competed in Ascenso MX, Mexico's second-tier football division. Founded in 1997, the club was established through Toluca's acquisition of the rights to Atlético Hidalgo, with its first season played in the Invierno 1997 tournament. Originally based in Ixtapan de la Sal, State of Mexico, Atlético Mexiquense relocated to the city of Toluca in 2008 and played at Nemesio Diez Stadium. The team served as a primary development pathway for young players advancing to the first team.

The club's greatest achievement was reaching the Apertura 2004 Ascenso MX final against San Luis. In the playoffs, Atlético Mexiquense defeated Correcaminos UAT and Querétaro across two-leg matches without conceding a defeat. In the final, Mexiquense won the first leg 1–0 before losing the second leg at Estadio Alfonso Lastras, falling 3–2 on aggregate to San Luis.

The club ceased operations at the end of the Clausura 2009 following a restructuring of Mexican football that eliminated reserve teams without promotion rights. Atlético Mexiquense was subsequently absorbed into Toluca's main academy.

== Toluca Premier ==
Toluca Premier was a reserve team of Toluca that participated in the Liga Premier de Ascenso, Mexico's third-tier football division, debuting in the 2015 Apertura season after a six-year hiatus. The team was based at the Metepec Facilities, and managed by José Edmundo Núñez.

In 2019, the team ceased operations following the dissolution of several Liga MX reserve sides in the Liga Premier as part of a restructuring of Mexico's youth development system.

== Youth academy ==
Toluca's youth academy comprises multiple age-group teams at the under-18 level, several of which have won their respective Liga MX youth titles.

Notable championships include the Clausura 2023 Sub-20 title, where they defeated América 2–1 on aggregate, and the Apertura 2024 Sub-15 title, where they beat América again with a 3–2 aggregate score to secure the championship.

At the international level, Toluca's under-13 team won the inaugural CONCACAF Under-13 Champions League in 2015, becoming the first champion of the continental youth competition.

=== Out on loan ===
Note: Flags indicate national team as defined under FIFA eligibility rules; some limited exceptions apply. Players may hold more than one non-FIFA nationality.

No.	Pos.	Nation	Player
—	FW	BRA	Willian Gabriel (at North Texas SC)

=== Honours ===
Type	Competition	Titles	Winning Seasons	Runners-up
Reserves and academy	Liga MX Sub-23	1	Clausura 2025	—
Reserves and academy	Liga MX Sub-20	1	Clausura 2023	Apertura 2019
Reserves and academy	Liga MX Sub-17	0	—	Clausura 2026
Reserves and academy	Liga MX Sub-15	1	Apertura 2024	Verano 2016 Clausura 2026
Reserves and academy	Liga MX Sub-13	1	Verano 2016	Primavera 2013

=== Current managers ===
- (Argentina) Guillermo Morigi – Academy Director
- (Uruguay) Carlos María Morales – U-23 Manager
- (Mexico) Octavio Valdez – U-19 Manager
- (Brazil) Nuilson Matías – U-17 Manager
- (Mexico) Manuel de la Torre – Youth Teams Manager
