= 2012–13 Atlante F.C. season =

Atlante
2012–13 season
- Chairman: Alejandro Burillo Azcárraga
- Manager: Ricardo La Volpe (until January 28, 2013); Daniel Guzmán (from January 29, 2013)
- Stadium: Estadio Andrés Quintana Roo
- Apertura 2012: 14th
- Clausura 2013: 18th (last)
- Copa MX (Apertura): Group Stage
- Copa MX (Clausura): Runners-up
- Top goalscorer: League: Apertura: Esteban Paredes (11); Clausura: Esteban Paredes (5); All: Esteban Paredes (17)
- Highest home attendance: Apertura: 12,146 vs Guadalajara (October 21, 2012); Clausura: 16,468 vs UNAM (May 5, 2013)
- Lowest home attendance: Apertura: 4,804 vs Morelia (October 7, 2012); Clausura: 3,810 vs Querétaro (February 17, 2013)
Home colours	Away colours

The 2012–13 Atlante season was the 66th professional season of Mexico's top-flight football league. The season is split into two tournaments—the Torneo Apertura and the Torneo Clausura—each with identical formats and each contested by the same eighteen teams. Atlante began their season on July 22, 2012, against Pachuca, Atlante played their home games on Sundays at 6:00pm local time. On April 10, 2013, Atlante lost the Clausura 2013 Copa MX final to Cruz Azul 4–2 on penalties. Atlante did not qualify to the final phase in either the Apertura or Clausura tournament.

== Torneo Apertura ==
=== Squad ===
Note: Flags indicate national team as defined under FIFA eligibility rules; some limited exceptions apply. Players may hold more than one non-FIFA nationality.

No.	Pos.	Nation	Player
1	GK	MEX	Antonio Pérez
2	DF	ECU	Jorge Guagua
4	DF	MEX	Luis Gerardo Venegas
5	DF	MEX	José Daniel Guerrero (Captain)
6	DF	MEX	Alfonso Luna
7	MF	CPV	Valdo
8	FW	PAR	Osvaldo Martínez
9	FW	CHI	Esteban Paredes
10	MF	ARG	Cristian Maidana
11	FW	MEX	Jerónimo Amione
13	MF	MEX	Óscar Ricardo Rojas (on loan from UNAM)
14	FW	MEX	Francisco Fonseca
15	DF	MEX	Arturo Muñoz
16	MF	USA	Sonny Guadarrama
17	MF	MEX	Ignacio Torres

No.	Pos.	Nation	Player
19	DF	MEX	Ricardo Jiménez
20	FW	MEX	Sergio Nápoles
21	DF	MEX	Luis Velázquez
22	MF	MEX	Eduardo Arce
23	GK	MEX	Jorge Villalpando
24	GK	MEX	Alejandro Arredondo (on loan from Leones Negros)
25	DF	MEX	Óscar Vera (on loan from Atlas)
26	DF	MEX	Ernesto Reyes
32	DF	MEX	Eugenio Arochi
37	MF	MEX	Fernando Herrera
54	DF	MEX	Gerardo Castillo
101	MF	MEX	Paul Uscanga
-	MF	MEX	Israel Martínez
-	MF	MEX	Raymundo Torres

=== Regular season ===
Win Draw Loss

==== Apertura 2012 results ====
July 22, 2012 Round 1	Atlante	0–0	Pachuca	Cancún, Quintana Roo
18:00		Report	Cejas (yellow card) 19'	Stadium: Estadio Andrés Quintana Roo; Referee: Ricardo Arellano

July 28, 2012 Round 2	UANL	2–1	Atlante	San Nicolás de los Garza, Nuevo León
19:00	Torres Nilo (yellow card) 41'; Lobos 75' (pen.); Ayala 85'	Report	O. Martínez (yellow card) 36'; Paredes 50'; Guerrero (yellow card) 61'; Fonseca (yellow card) 71'	Stadium: Estadio Universitario; Referee: Miguel Ángel Ortega

August 5, 2012 Round 3	Atlante	2–2	América	Cancún, Quintana Roo
18:00	Paredes 14'; Martínez 40'; Guerrero (yellow card) 48'; Villalpando (yellow card) 56'; Venegas (yellow card) 59'	Report	Aldrete (yellow card) 21'; Pimentel (yellow card) 38'; Sambueza 48'; Benítez 66', (yellow card) 66'; Mosquera (yellow card) 90+1'	Stadium: Estadio Andrés Quintana Roo; Referee: Fabricio Morales

August 10, 2012 Round 4	Chiapas	1–2	Atlante	Tuxtla Gutiérrez, Chiapas
19:30	Espinoza (yellow card) 43'; Bedolla (yellow card) 65'; Rey 76'	Report	I. Martínez (yellow card) 33'; O. Martínez (yellow card) 38'; Guerrero (yellow card) 50'; Paredes 56', 85'	Stadium: Estadio Victor Manuel Reyna; Referee: Víctor Bisguerra Mendiola

August 18, 2012 Round 5	Monterrey	1–1	Atlante	Monterrey, Nuevo León
19:00	Guagua 22' (o.g.); Corona (yellow card) 81'	Report	Venegas (red card) 73'; O. Martínez 84' (pen.)	Stadium: Estadio Tecnológico; Attendance: 33,268; Referee: Francisco Chacón

August 26, 2012 Round 6	Atlante	1–0	Atlas	Cancún, Quintana Roo
18:00	O. Martínez 42'	Report		Stadium: Estadio Andrés Quintana Roo; Attendance: 5,468; Referee: Marco Antonio Rodríguez

September 1, 2012 Round 7	Querétaro	0–1	Atlante	Querétaro, Querétaro
17:00	García Arias (yellow card) 13'; Valencia (yellow card) 64'; Bueno (yellow card) 77'; Jiménez (yellow card) 90+2'; García (yellow card) 90+3'	Report	Paredes 17'; Guagua (yellow card) 53'; I. Martínez (yellow card) 59'; Villalpando (yellow card) 77'	Stadium: Estadio Corregidora; Attendance: 9,350; Referee: Erim Ramírez

September 16, 2012 Round 8	Atlante	1–2	Tijuana	Cancún, Quintana Roo
17:00	Venegas (yellow card) 37'; O. Martínez (yellow card) 38'; Paredes 87'; Calvo (yellow card) 90+3'	Report	Aguilar (yellow card) 25'; Gandolfi (yellow card) 37'; Pellerano (yellow card) 44'; Riascos 50'; Moreno 51'	Stadium: Estadio Andrés Quintana Roo; Attendance: 6,473; Referee: Miguel Ángel Ayala

September 23, 2012 Round 9	Toluca	1–0	Atlante	Toluca, Estado de México
12:00	Wilson Mathías (yellow card) 20'; Tejada (yellow card) 71', (goal) 83'	Report	Rojas (yellow card) 50'; Calvo (yellow card) 85'	Stadium: Estadio Nemesio Díez; Attendance: 9,487; Referee: Luis Enrique Santander

September 30, 2012 Round 10	Atlante	1–3	Santos Laguna	Cancún, Quintana Roo
18:00	Guagua (yellow card) 43'; Nápoles 82'	Report	Ludueña 14'; Quintero 58'; Salinas (yellow card) 60'; Peralta 84'	Stadium: Estadio Andrés Quintana Roo; Attendance: 6,000; Referee: Fernando Guerrero

October 3, 2012 Round 11	Cruz Azul	4–0	Atlante	Mexico City
19:00	Orozco (yellow card) 17'; Pavone 28', (yellow card) 38'; Giménez 65'; Aquino 76'; Castro 85'; Flores (yellow card) 89'	Report	Amione (yellow card) 39'; Venegas (yellow card) 60'	Stadium: Estadio Azul; Attendance: 10,822; Referee: José Alfredo Peñaloza

October 7, 2012 Round 12	Atlante	2–2	Morelia	Cancún, Quintana Roo
18:00	Venegas 3', 17'; Nápoles (yellow card) 42'; Guagua (yellow card) 44'; Fonseca (yellow card) 66'; Calvo (yellow card) 76'	Report	Ramírez (yellow card) 15'; Montero (yellow card) 44'; Valdez (yellow card) 54'; Morales (yellow card) 61'; Rojas (yellow card) 74'; Sabah 82', 85'; Huiqui (yellow card) 90'	Stadium: Estadio Andrés Quintana Roo; Attendance: 4,804; Referee: Roberto García Orozco

October 13, 2012 Round 13	San Luis	2–2	Atlante	San Luis Potosí, San Luis Potosí
19:00	Mendoza 2', (yellow card) 58'; Maya 60', (yellow card) 61'	Report	Guerrero (yellow card) 58'; Amione 82', 90+2', (yellow card) 90+2'; Venegas (yellow card) 90+1'; Arochi (yellow card) 90+3'	Stadium: Estadio Alfonso Lastras; Attendance: 8,220; Referee: Óscar Macias

October 21, 2012 Round 14	Atlante	3–1	Guadalajara	Cancún, Quintana Roo
18:00	Maidana 3', (yellow card) 4' (yellow-red card) 48'; Guagua (yellow card) 22'; Paredes 24', 44', (yellow card) 78'; Muñoz (yellow card) 81'; O. Martínez (yellow card) 88'; Vera (yellow card) 90'	Report	Álvarez (yellow card) 78'; Fabián 89' (pen.)	Stadium: Estadio Andrés Quintana Roo; Attendance: 12,146; Referee: Ricardo Arellano

October 28, 2012 Round 15	Puebla	1–2	Atlante	Puebla, Puebla
12:00	Abelairas (yellow card) 51'; Miranda 64'	Report	Paredes 4'; Fonseca 90+1'	Stadium: Estadio Cuauhtémoc; Attendance: 10,684; Referee: Fabricio Morales

November 4, 2012 Round 16	Atlante	2–3	León	Cancún, Quintana Roo
18:00	O. Martínez (yellow card) 23' (yellow-red card) 90+3'; Maidana 53', (yellow card) 57'; Amione (yellow card) 75' (yellow-red card) 90+4'; Calvo (yellow card) 75'; Paredes 90'	Report	Maz 1', 30', (yellow card) 72'; González (yellow card) 45+1'; Peña 55'; Martínez (yellow card) 81'	Stadium: Estadio Andrés Quintana Roo; Attendance: 6,850; Referee: Miguel Ángel Flores

November 11, 2012 Round 17	UNAM	3–2	Atlante	Mexico City
12:00	Fuentes 30'; M. Palacios 39', (yellow card) 45+1'; Cortés (yellow card) 45+1'; Bravo 76'	Report	Paredes 5'; M. Palacios 51' (o.g.); Guagua (yellow card) 71'	Stadium: Estadio Olímpico Universitario; Attendance: 17,344; Referee: Erim Ramírez

=== Goalscorers ===
Position	Nation	Name	Goals scored
1.	(Chile)	Esteban Paredes	11
2.	(Paraguay)	Osvaldo Martínez	3
3.	(Mexico)	Jerónimo Amione	2
3.	(Argentina)	Cristian Maidana	2
3.	(Mexico)	Luis Gerardo Venegas	2
6.	(Mexico)	Francisco Fonseca	1
6.	(Mexico)	Sergio Nápoles	1
6.		Own Goals	1
TOTAL			23

=== Results ===
==== Results summary ====
Overall								Home						Away					
Pld	W	D	L	GF	GA	GD	Pts	W	D	L	GF	GA	GD	W	D	L	GF	GA	GD
17	5	5	7	23	28	−5	20	2	3	3	12	13	−1	3	2	4	11	15	−4

Last updated: 11 November 2012.
Source: Apertura 2012 results

==== Results by round ====
Round	1	2	3	4	5	6	7	8	9	10	11	12	13	14	15	16	17
Ground	H	A	H	A	A	H	A	H	A	H	A	H	A	H	A	H	A
Result	D	L	D	W	D	W	W	L	L	L	L	D	D	W	W	L	L
Position	12	11	13	10	11	8	6	9	9	12	14	14	14	13	10	12	14

Updated to match(es) played on 11 November 2012. Source: Apertura 2012 results and mediotiempo.com
A = Away; H = Home; W = Win; D = Draw; L = Loss

== Apertura 2012 Copa MX ==
=== Group stage ===
Win Draw Loss

==== Apertura results ====
July 25, 2012 1	Atlante	1–1	La Piedad	Cancún, Quintana Roo
21:00	Nápoles 47'; Torres (red card) 65'		Gaxiola (yellow card) 35' (yellow-red card) 38'; Sánchez 52', (yellow card) 54'; Godínez (yellow card) 57'	Stadium: Estadio Andrés Quintana Roo; Referee: Antony Zanjuampa

August 2, 2012 2	La Piedad	0–0	Atlante	La Piedad, Michoacán
16:00	Soto (yellow card) 8'; Palacios (yellow card) 41'	Report	Amione (yellow card) 77'	Stadium: Estadio Juan N. López; Referee: Erick Miranda

August 7, 2012 3	Atlante	1–0	U. de G.	Cancún, Quintana Roo
21:00	Amione (yellow card) 57'; Rodríguez 86'	Report		Stadium: Estadio Andrés Quintana Roo; Referee: Óscar Macías Romo

August 21, 2012 4	U. de G.	1–1	Atlante	Guadalajara, Jalisco
19:00	Díaz 72'	Report	Rodríguez 90+3'	Stadium: Estadio Jalisco; Referee: Emerson Zamora

August 29, 2012 5	Atlante	0–1	Pachuca	Cancún, Quintana Roo
21:00		Report	Arreola (red card) 40'; Almeia 89'	Stadium: Estadio Andrés Quintana Roo; Attendance: 2,700; Referee: Víctor Bisguerra Mendiola

September 19, 2012 6	Pachuca	1–0	Atlante	Pachuca, Hidalgo
21:00	Medina 6'; Pizzaro (yellow card) 32'; Meza (yellow card) 39'	Report	Torres (yellow card) 40'; Marrufo (yellow card) 64'; Zurita (yellow card) 90'	Stadium: Estadio Hidalgo; Attendance: 7,500; Referee: Miguel Ángel Chacón

=== Goalscorers ===
Position	Nation	Name	Goals scored
1.	(Mexico)	Luis Eduardo Rodríguez	2
2.	(Mexico)	Sergio Javier Nápoles	1
TOTAL			3

==== Results by round ====
Round	1	2	3	4	5	6
Ground	H	A	H	A	H	A
Result	D	D	W	D	L	L
Position	2	3	2	2	2	3

Updated to match(es) played on 19 September 2012. Source: Apertura results and mediotiempo.com
A = Away; H = Home; W = Win; D = Draw; L = Loss

== Torneo Clausura ==
=== Squad ===
Note: Flags indicate national team as defined under FIFA eligibility rules; some limited exceptions apply. Players may hold more than one non-FIFA nationality.

No.	Pos.	Nation	Player
1	DF	URU	Joe Bizera
2	DF	MEX	Erik Pimentel
3	MF	MEX	Óscar Ricardo Rojas
4	DF	MEX	Luis Gerardo Venegas
5	MF	MEX	José Daniel Guerrero (captain)
6	DF	MEX	Alfonso Luna
7	FW	CHI	Esteban Paredes (vice-captain)
8	DF	MEX	José Antonio Castro
10	MF	ARG	Cristian Maidana
11	FW	MEX	Jerónimo Amione
14	FW	MEX	Francisco Fonseca
15	DF	MEX	Arturo Muñoz
16	MF	ECU	David Quiroz
17	FW	MEX	Diego Jiménez
18	MF	MEX	Israel Martínez
19	FW	ARG	Joaquín Larrivey
20	FW	MEX	Sergio Nápoles
21	GK	MEX	Gerardo Ruíz
22	DF	MEX	Carlos Calvo
23	GK	MEX	Jorge Villalpando

No.	Pos.	Nation	Player
24	GK	MEX	Alejandro Arredondo
25	MF	MEX	Oscar Vera
26	DF	MEX	Ernesto Reyes
27	MF	MEX	Francisco Uscanga
28	FW	MEX	Alberto García
29	DF	MEX	Diego Jiménez
30	DF	MEX	Diego Ordaz
31	FW	MEX	Kevin Zapata
32	DF	MEX	Eugenio Arochi
33	FW	MEX	Eduardo Rodríguez
34	MF	MEX	Óscar Vieyra
35	GK	MEX	Jesús Cabrera
36	FW	CRO	Dario Brezak
75	MF	MEX	Francisco Estrada
77	MF	MEX	Santiago López
78	FW	MEX	Claudio González
80	MF	MEX	Aldo Alemán Reyes
83	DF	MEX	Víctor Cabrera
89	DF	MEX	José Luis Calderón
96	FW	MEX	Manuel Marroquín
101	FW	MEX	Cuauhtémoc Domínguez

=== Regular season ===
Win Draw Loss

==== Clausura 2013 results ====
January 5, 2013 Round 1	Pachuca	2–0	Atlante	Pachuca, Hidalgo
19:00	Hurtado (yellow card) 44'; Carreño 66'; H. Herrera 89'	Report	Uscanga (yellow card) 36'; Castro (yellow card) 76'	Stadium: Estadio Hidalgo; Attendance: 25,934; Referee: César Arturo Ramos

January 13, 2013 Round 2	Atlante	1–3	UANL	Cancún, Quintana Roo
18:00	Calvo (yellow card) 37'; Paredes 39'; Ordaz (yellow card) 52' (yellow-red card) 61'; Rojas (yellow card) 88'	Report	Álvarez 10', (yellow card) 65'; Dueñas (yellow card) 38'; Lobos 53'; Ayala (yellow card) 67'; Venegas 74' (o.g.)	Stadium: Estadio Andrés Quintana Roo; Attendance: 10,554; Referee: Miguel Ángel Ayala

January 19, 2013 Round 3	América	4–0	Atlante	Coyoacán, Mexico City
17:00	Molina 10'; Sambueza (yellow card) 18'; Jiménez 30', 37'; F. Rodríguez (yellow card) 70'; Benítez 80'	Report	Venegas (yellow card) 18'; Guerrero (yellow card) 25'; Larrivey (yellow card) 42'	Stadium: Estadio Azteca; Attendance: 41,095; Referee: Fernando Guerrero

January 27, 2013 Round 4	Atlante	4–3	Chiapas	Cancún, Quintana Roo
18:00	Larrivey 10', 14'; Maidana (yellow card) 39'; Amione (yellow card) 41'; Jiménez (yellow card) 52'; Ordaz 89'; Venegas 90+1'	Report	Hernández (yellow card) 16'; Gastélum (yellow card) 26' (yellow-red card) 63'; Martínez (yellow card) 36' (red card) 66'; Jiménez 56'; Loroña 65', 74'	Stadium: Estadio Andrés Quintana Roo; Attendance: 3,813; Referee: José Alfredo Peñaloza

February 3, 2013 Round 5	Atlante	3–1	Monterrey	Cancún, Quintana Roo
18:00	Fonseca 47'; Maidana 71'; Paredes 76'; Muñoz (yellow card) 89'	Report	Basanta (yellow card) 39'; López (yellow card) 62' de Nigris 82'; Morales (yellow card) 90+1'	Stadium: Estadio Andrés Quintana Roo; Attendance: 6,779; Referee: Erim Ramírez

February 9, 2013 Round 6	Atlas	2–1	Atlante	Guadalajara, Jalisco
21:00	Barraza 5'; Cufré (yellow card) 13'; Millar (yellow card) 46'; Razo (yellow card) 63'; Rivera 67'	Report	Erpen 54' (o.g.); Ordaz (yellow card) 89'	Stadium: Estadio Jalisco; Attendance: 19,716; Referee: Francisco Chacón

February 17, 2013 Round 7	Atlante	1–1	Querétaro	Cancún, Quintana Roo
18:00	Fonseca (yellow card) 22'; Guerrero (yellow card) 51'; Venegas (yellow card) 55'; Bizera 90+3'	Report	Cosme (yellow card) 55'; Landín 67', (yellow card) 72'; García (yellow card) 80' de la Torre (yellow card) 90+3'	Stadium: Estadio Andrés Quintana Roo; Attendance: 3,810; Referee: Antony Zanjuampa

February 23, 2013 Round 8	Tijuana	2–0	Atlante	Tijuana, Baja California
17:00	Enríquez 2'; Núñez (yellow card) 72'; Riascos 86'	Report	Bizera (yellow card) 25'; Vera (yellow card) 36'	Stadium: Estadio Caliente; Attendance: 23,133; Referee: Fabricio Morales

March 3, 2013 Round 9	Atlante	0–1	Toluca	Cancún, Quintana Roo
18:00	Bizera (yellow card) 65'	Report	Tejada 34'; Dueñas (yellow card) 89'	Stadium: Estadio Andrés Quintana Roo; Attendance: 7,010; Referee: Jorge Antonio Pérez

March 9, 2013 Round 10	Santos Laguna	2–1	Atlante	Torreón, Coahuila
19:00	Gómez 43', (yellow card) 72'; Galindo (yellow card) 51'; Peralta 58'; Crosas (yellow card) 88'	Report	Bizera (yellow card) 41'; Venegas (yellow card) 77'; Paredes 87'; Guzmán (red card) 87' (manager)	Stadium: Estadio Corona; Referee: Luis Enrique Santander

March 17, 2013 Round 11	Atlante	0–3	Cruz Azul	Cancún, Quintana Roo
18:00	Bizera (red card) 27'; Paredes (yellow card) 48'; Fonseca (yellow card) 57'; Jiménez Villa (yellow card) 80'; Martínez (yellow card) 89'	Report	Pavone 43', 55'; Torrado (yellow card) 53'; Perea (yellow card) 73'; Jiménez Villa 80' (o.g.); Bertolo (yellow card) 89'	Stadium: Estadio Andrés Quintana Roo; Attendance: 9,654; Referee: Erim Ramírez

March 30, 2013 Round 12	Morelia	4–0	Atlante	Morelia, Michoacán
19:00	Martínez 4' (o.g.); Mancilla 20'; Pérez (yellow card) 24'; Huiqui (yellow card) 45+1'; Valdez (yellow card) 74'; Ochoa 85', 90+1'	Report	García (yellow card) 37'; Paredes (yellow card) 56'; Venegas (yellow card) 76'	Stadium: Estadio Morelos; Attendance: 10,896; Referee: Óscar Macias

April 7, 2013 Round 13	Atlante	0–1	San Luis	Cancún, Quintana Roo
18:00	Amione (yellow card) 58'	Report	Corona (yellow card) 27'; López (red card) 41'; Rodríguez (yellow card) 45' (yellow-red card) 82', (goal) 74'	Stadium: Estadio Andrés Quintana Roo; Referee: Jorge Isaac Rojas

April 14, 2013 Round 14	Guadalajara	1–2	Atlante	Zapopan, Jalisco
17:00	Álvarez (yellow card) 24'; Márquez 26' (pen.); Araujo (yellow card) 77'; Sánchez (yellow card) 83'	Report	Vera (yellow card) 66'; Venegas 77'; Bizera (yellow card) 81'; Uscanga 88'	Stadium: Estadio Omnilife; Attendance: 20,842; Referee: Marco Antonio Rodríguez

April 21, 2013 Round 15	Atlante	2–0	Puebla	Cancún, Quintana Roo
17:00	Paredes 11', 88'; Vera (yellow card) 44'; Quiroz (yellow card) 90'	Report	Paredes (yellow card) 31'	Stadium: Estadio Andrés Quintana Roo; Attendance: 4,300; Referee: Roberto García Orozco

April 27, 2013 Round 16	León	1–0	Atlante	León, Guanajuato
20:06	Márquez (yellow card) 41'; Pacheco 78'	Report	Venegas (yellow card) 34'; Villalpando (yellow card) 54'; Nápoles (yellow card) 57'	Stadium: Estadio León; Attendance: 21,288; Referee: Fabricio Morales

May 5, 2013 Round 17	Atlante	1–2	UNAM	Cancún, Quintana Roo
18:00	Calvo (yellow card) 58'; Martínez (yellow card) 59'; Venegas 70', (yellow card) 71'	Report	Cabrera 21'; Quintana (yellow card) 35' (yellow-red card) 52'; Luis García 55'; Van Rankin (yellow card) 68'; Verón (yellow card) 83'	Stadium: Estadio Andrés Quintana Roo; Attendance: 16,468; Referee: Jorge Antonio Pérez

Atlante did not qualify to the Final Phase

=== Goalscorers ===
Position	Nation	Name	Goals scored
1.	(Chile)	Esteban Paredes	5
2.	(Mexico)	Luis Gerardo Venegas	3
3.	(Argentina)	Joaquín Larrivey	2
4.	(Argentina)	Joe Bizera	1
4.	(Mexico)	Francisco Fonseca	1
4.	(Argentina)	Cristian Maidana	1
4.	(Mexico)	Diego Ordaz	1
4.	(Mexico)	Francisco Uscanga	1
4.		Own Goals	1
TOTAL			16

=== Results ===
==== Results summary ====
Overall								Home						Away					
Pld	W	D	L	GF	GA	GD	Pts	W	D	L	GF	GA	GD	W	D	L	GF	GA	GD
17	4	1	12	16	33	−17	13	3	1	5	12	15	−3	1	0	7	4	18	−14

Last updated: 5 May 2013.
Source: Clausura 2013 results

==== Results by round ====
Round	1	2	3	4	5	6	7	8	9	10	11	12	13	14	15	16	17
Ground	A	H	A	H	H	A	H	A	H	A	H	A	H	A	H	A	H
Result	L	L	L	W	W	L	D	L	L	L	L	L	L	W	W	L	W
Position	17	17	18	15	10	14	14	15	15	15	16	17	18	17	16	18	18

Updated to match(es) played on 5 May 2013. Source: Clausura 2013 results and mediotiempo.com
A = Away; H = Home; W = Win; D = Draw; L = Loss

== Clausura 2013 Copa MX ==
=== Group stage ===
Win Draw Loss

==== Clausura results ====
January 15, 2013 1	Atlante	2–2	Dorados	Cancún, Quintana Roo
21:00	Amione 16', (yellow card) 90+3' (yellow-red card) 90+4'; Domínguez (yellow card) 38'; Rojas (yellow card) 62'; Fonseca 64'	Report	Pinto (yellow card) 2'; Ramírez 42'; Castro 69'; Frausto (red card) 87'	Stadium: Estadio Andrés Quintana Roo; Attendance: 3,200; Referee: Jorge Isaac Rojas

January 23, 2013 2	Dorados	0–1	Atlante	Culiacán, Sinaloa
20:00	Güemez (yellow card) 61'; López (yellow card) 65' (yellow-red card) 78'; Castro (yellow card) 86'	Report	Rodríguez (red card) 76'; González 86'	Stadium: Estadio Banorte; Referee: Ángel Monroy

February 13, 2013 3	UAT	0–1	Atlante	Ciudad Victoria, Tamaulipas
21:00	Ayala (yellow card) 18'; Pacheco (yellow card) 34'; Jiménez (yellow card) 35'; Espinoza (yellow card) 50'	Report	García 46'; Muñoz (yellow card) 50' (yellow-red card) 84'; Pimentel (yellow card) 63'; Jiménez (yellow card) 90'	Stadium: Estadio Marte R. Gómez; Referee: Cirilo Arturo Cruz

February 19, 2013 4	Atlante	4–0	UAT	Cancún, Quintana Roo
19:00	García 36', 55'; Martínez (yellow card) 63'; Amione 64', 65'; Domínguez (yellow card) 79'; Alemán (yellow card) 84'	Report	Sena (yellow card) 24'; Orozco (yellow card) 84'; Ayala (red card) 85'	Stadium: Estadio Andrés Quintana Roo; Referee: Jorge Isaac Rojas

February 26, 2013 5	Pachuca	4–2	Atlante	Pachuca, Hidalgo
19:00	Ludueña 3', 51'; Cavenaghi 23', 62'; M. Herrera (yellow card) 45'	Report	García 11'; Jiménez (yellow card) 22'; Amione (yellow card) 50', (goal) 88'	Stadium: Estadio Hidalgo; Attendance: 5,842; Referee: Luis Enrique Santander

March 6, 2013 6	Atlante	1–0	Pachuca	Cancún, Quintana Roo
19:00	Fonseca 10'; García (yellow card) 60'	Report	Torres (yellow card) 51'; Mañon (yellow card) 79'; Meraz (yellow card) 86'	Stadium: Estadio Andrés Quintana Roo; Attendance: 2,991; Referee: Miguel Ángel Ortega

=== Knockout stage ===
March 13, 2013 Quarter-finals	Atlante	0–0 (3–2 p)	Atlas	Cancún, Quintana Roo
21:15	Jiménez (yellow card) 40'; Quiroz (yellow card) 41'; García (yellow card) 56'; Fonseca (yellow card) 69'; Amione (yellow card) 83'	Report	Robles (yellow card) 38'	Stadium: Estadio Andrés Quintana Roo; Attendance: 4,907; Referee: Miguel Ángel Ayala
	Penalties
	D.F. Jiménez (penalty missed); Nápoles (penalty scored); D.O. Jiménez (penalty scored); Calvo (penalty missed); Fonseca (penalty scored)		(penalty missed) Barraza; (penalty scored) Gutiérrez; (penalty missed) Bocanegra; (penalty scored) Robles; (penalty missed) Paganoni

April 3, 2013 Semi-finals	Atlante	1–1 (5–4 p)	Puebla	Cancún, Quintana Roo
19:00	Amione (yellow card) 53'; Paredes 79' (pen.)	Report	de Buen (yellow card) 21'; Lacerda (yellow card) 38'; Medina (yellow card) 55'; Romo 72'	Stadium: Estadio Andrés Quintana Roo; Attendance: 9,295; Referee: Jorge Antonio Pérez
	Penalties
	Fonseca (penalty scored); García (penalty scored); Bizera (penalty missed); Villalpando (penalty scored); Paredes (penalty missed); Vera (penalty scored); Venegas (penalty scored)		(penalty scored) Noriega; (penalty scored) Paredes; (penalty scored) Lacerda; (penalty missed) González; (penalty missed) Romo; (penalty scored) Arce; (penalty missed) Durán

April 10, 2013 Final	Atlante	0–0 (2–4 p)	Cruz Azul	Cancún, Quintana Roo
21:00	Fonseca (yellow card) 24'; Venegas (yellow card) 61'	Report	Perea (yellow card) 24'; T. Gutiérrez (yellow card) 62'	Stadium: Estadio Andrés Quintana Roo; Referee: César Arturo Ramos
	Penalties
	Fonseca (penalty missed); García (penalty scored); Quiroz (penalty scored); Venegas (penalty missed)		(penalty scored) T. Gutiérrez; (penalty scored) Orozco; (penalty scored) A. Castro; (penalty scored) Barrera

=== Goalscorers ===
Position	Nation	Name	Goals scored
1.	(Mexico)	Jerónimo Amione	4
1.	(Mexico)	Alberto García	4
3.	(Mexico)	Francisco Fonseca	2
4.	(Mexico)	Claudio González	1
4.	(Chile)	Esteban Paredes	1
TOTAL			12

=== Results ===
==== Results by round ====
Round	1	2	3	4	5	6
Ground	H	A	A	H	A	H
Result	D	W	W	W	L	W
Position	2	2	2	1	2	1

Updated to match(es) played on 6 March 2013. Source: Clausura results and mediotiempo.com
A = Away; H = Home; W = Win; D = Draw; L = Loss
