= 2011–12 Atlante F.C. season =

Atlante
2011–12 season
- Chairman: Alejandro Burillo Azcárraga
- Manager: Miguel Herrera (until Nov., 2011); Mario García (Nov., 2011–Apr. 2012); José Luis González China (Apr. 2012)
- Stadium: Estadio Andrés Quintana Roo
- Apertura 2011: 14th
- Clausura 2012: 14th
- Top goalscorer: League: Apertura: Osvaldo Martínez (6); Clausura: Michael Arroyo (5); All: Osvaldo Martínez (11)
Home colours	Away colours	Third colours

The 2011–12 Atlante season was the 65th professional season of Mexico's top-flight football league. The season is split into two tournaments—the Torneo Apertura and the Torneo Clausura—each with identical formats and each contested by the same eighteen teams. Atlante began their season on July 23, 2011 against Guadalajara, Atlante play their home games on Saturdays at 9:00pm local time.

== Torneo Apertura ==
=== Squad ===
Note: Flags indicate national team as defined under FIFA eligibility rules; some limited exceptions apply. Players may hold more than one non-FIFA nationality.

No.	Pos.	Nation	Player
1	GK	MEX	Antonio Pérez
3	MF	MEX	Alex Diego
4	DF	MEX	Luis Gerardo Venegas
5	DF	ARG	Nicolás Torres
6	DF	MEX	Alfonso Luna
7	MF	MEX	Jorge Hernández
8	MF	PAR	Osvaldo Martínez
9	FW	VEN	Giancarlo Maldonado
10	MF	MEX	Christian Bermúdez
11	FW	MEX	Mario Ortiz
13	FW	MEX	Óscar Ricardo Rojas
14	FW	MEX	Francisco Fonseca
15	DF	MEX	Arturo Muñoz
16	MF	USA	Sonny Guadarrama
17	DF	MEX	José Daniel Guerrero (Captain)
18	FW	ARG	Juan Cuevas

No.	Pos.	Nation	Player
19	DF	MEX	Diego Ordaz
22	MF	MEX	Eduardo Arce
23	GK	MEX	Moisés Muñoz
24	GK	MEX	Alejandro Arredondo
25	DF	MEX	Oscar Vera
28	FW	MEX	Jerónimo Amione
32	MF	MEX	Pablo Gutierrez
33	MF	ARG	Matías Córdoba
37	MF	MEX	Fernando Herrera Espinoza
39	DF	MEX	Sergio Nápoles
77	DF	MEX	Eugenio Arochi
82	DF	MEX	Ernesto Reyes
83	DF	MEX	Gerson Cob
87	FW	MEX	Raúl Galán
91	FW	MEX	Lisandro Echeverria
101	MF	MEX	Paul Uscanga

=== Regular season ===
Win Draw Loss

==== Apertura 2011 results ====
July 23, 2011 Round 1	Atlante	0–2	Guadalajara	Estadio Quintana Roo, Cancún
17:00	Ordaz (yellow card) 46'; Luna (yellow card) 61'; Cuevas (yellow card) 66'; Diego (yellow card) 86'; Amione (yellow card) 90+2'	Report	Ponce (yellow card) 33' de Luna (yellow card) 51'; Arellano 55'; Sánchez 90+4'	Referee: Erim Ramírez

July 30, 2011 Round 2	Santos Laguna	3–0	Atlante	Estadio Corona, Torreón
19:00	Suárez 17'; Quintero 48'; Rodríguez (yellow card) 57'; Ochoa 84'	Report	Diego (yellow card) 49'	Referee: Miguel Ángel Ayala

August 3, 2011 Round 3	Atlante	5–1	Puebla	Estadio Quintana Roo, Cancún
21:00	Venegas 23'; Maldonado 37' (pen.); Bermúdez 41', 77'; Ortiz (yellow card) 70'; Diego (yellow card) 90*2'; Cuevas 90+3'	Report	Cervantes (yellow card) 33'; Luis García (yellow card) 35'; Lucas Silva 57'	Referee: Jorge Isaac Rojas

August 6, 2011 Round 4	Cruz Azul	2–1	Atlante	Estadio Azul, Mexico City
16:00	Villaluz (yellow card) 34'; Torrado (yellow card) 40'; Villa 45'; Orozco 48'; Pinto (yellow card) 90'	Report	Maldonado 55'; Amione (yellow card) 90+1'	Referee: Fabricio Morales

August 13, 2011 Round 5	Atlante	1–3	Querétaro	Estadio Quintana Roo, Cancún
21:00	Venegas (yellow card) 8'; Maldonado 58'; Torres (yellow card) 66'	Report	Pérez (yellow card) 15'; Bueno 30', 68'; López (yellow card) 61'; Vázquez 74'	Referee: Roberto García Orozco

August 21, 2011 Round 6	Toluca	2–1	Atlante	Estadio Nemesio Díez, Toluca
12:00	de la Torre (yellow card) 50'; Calderón 53'; Brizuela 66'	Report	A. Muñoz (yellow card) 35'; Bermúdez 46'; Guadarrama (yellow card) 73'	Referee: Miguel Ángel Ortega

August 27, 2011 Round 7	Atlante	2–1	Estudiantes Tecos	Estadio Quintana Roo, Cancún
21:00	Cuevas (yellow card) 15'; Ortiz 26'; Martínez 52' (pen.); Guerrero (yellow card) 58'; Fonseca (yellow card) 62'	Report	Alatorre (red card) 61'; Sambueza (yellow card) 58', (goal) 90+3'; Lillingston (yellow card) 62'	Referee: Ricardo Arellano

September 11, 2011 Round 8	América	0–1	Atlante	Estadio Azteca, Mexico City
16:00	Rosieni (yellow card) 5'; Oregón (yellow card) 20'; Molina (yellow card) 44' (yellow-red card) 45+1'	Report	Rojas (yellow card) 9'; Diego (yellow card) 14'; Luna (yellow card) 23'; Martínez 48'	Referee: Marco Antonio Rodríguez

September 17, 2011 Round 9	Atlante	1–0	UANL	Estadio Quintana Roo, Cancún
21:00	Amione 18', (yellow card) 89' (yellow-red card) 89'; Luna (yellow card) 29'; Rojas (yellow card) 43'; Cuevas (yellow card) 48'	Report	Danilinho (yellow card) 48'; Toledo (yellow card) 60'; Torres Milo (yellow card) 62'	Referee: Mauricio Morales

September 24, 2011 Round 10	Atlas	2–3	Atlante	Estadio Jalisco, Guadalajara
20:45	Rodríguez 13', (yellow card) 29'; Meza (yellow card) 33'; Bocanegra 50', (yellow card) 51'	Report	Maldonado 24'; Martínez 31' (pen.); Guerrero (yellow card) 45'; Venegas (yellow card) 68'; Fonseca 79'	Referee: Jorge Antonio Pérez

October 1, 2011 Round 11	Atlante	0–1	Pachuca	Estadio Quintana Roo, Cancún
21:00	Guerrero (yellow card) 17'; Fonseca (yellow card) 65'; Cuevas (yellow card) 89'	Report	Brambilla (yellow card) 25'; Chávez (yellow card) 41'; Herrera (yellow card) 44'; Muñoz Mustafa (yellow card) 62'; Ayoví 68'; Rodríguez (yellow card) 83'	Referee: Fernando Guerrero

October 8, 2011 Round 12	Atlante	1–1	San Luis	Estadio Quintana Roo, Cancún
21:00	Arredondo (yellow card) 19'; González (yellow card) 22'; Sánchez (yellow card) 52' (yellow-red card) 81'; Alcántar (yellow card) 69'; Cuevas 82'	Report	Amione (yellow card) 18'; Arce 47'; Martínez (yellow card) 73'; Torres (yellow card) 81'; Pérez (yellow card) 90+3'	Referee: Ricardo Arellano

October 15, 2011 Round 13	Chiapas	1–1	Atlante	Estadio Victor Manuel Reyna, Tuxtla Gutiérrez
17:00	Zamorano (yellow card) 42'; J. Martínez 57'; Arizala (yellow card) 62'	Report	Martínez 75' (pen.)	Referee: Francisco Chacón

October 22, 2011 Round 14	Atlante	1–1	Tijuana	Estadio Quintana Roo, Cancún
21:00	Cuevas (yellow card) 40' (yellow-red card) 89'; Rojas 60'; Venegas (yellow card) 89'; Diego (yellow card) 90+2'	Report	Lenadro (yellow card) 15'; Yacuzzi (yellow card) 34'; Sand 39'; Abrego (yellow card) 76'	Referee: Fabricio Morales

October 26, 2011 Round 15	UNAM	1–0	Atlante	Estadio Olímpico Universitario, Mexico City
21:00	Espinosa (yellow card) 39' (yellow-red card) 88'; Bravo 73'	Report	Guerrero (yellow card) 35'	Referee: Paul Delgadillo

October 29, 2011 Round 16	Atlante	4–4	Morelia	Estadio Neza 86, Ciudad Nezahualcóyotl
16:00	Venegas (yellow card) 5', (goal) 90+1'; Cuevas (yellow card) 33'; Luna (yellow card) 71'; Martínez 75', 85' (pen.); Bermúdez 82'	Report	Huiqui (yellow card) 14'; Márquez 18', 80'; Lugo 31'; Ramírez (yellow card) 52'; Venegas 69' (o.g.); Cabrera (red card) 84'; Lozano (yellow card) 90+2'	Referee: Marco Antonio Rodríguez

November 5, 2011 Round 17	Monterrey	3–2	Atlante	Estadio Tecnológico, Monterrey
17:00	Delgado 26', 62', (yellow card) 78'; Zavala 75'; Mier 77'; Cardozo (red card) 81'; Diego 90+1'	Report	Guadarrama 70'; Cuevas (yellow card) 73'; Maldonado 78'	Referee: Mauricio Morales

Atlante did not qualify to the Final Phase

=== Goalscorers ===
Position	Nation	Name	Goals scored
1.	(Paraguay)	Osvaldo Martínez	6
2.	(Venezuela)	Giancarlo Maldonado	5
3.	(Mexico)	Christian Bermúdez	4
4.	(Argentina)	Juan Cuevas	2
4.	(Mexico)	Luis Gerardo Venegas	2
5.	(Mexico)	Jerónimo Amione	1
5.	(Mexico)	Francisco Fonseca	1
5.	(United States)	Sonny Guadarrama	1
5.	(Mexico)	Mario Ortiz	1
5.	(Mexico)	Óscar Rojas	1
TOTAL			24

=== Results ===
==== Results summary ====
Overall								Home						Away					
Pld	W	D	L	GF	GA	GD	Pts	W	D	L	GF	GA	GD	W	D	L	GF	GA	GD
17	5	4	8	24	28	−4	19	3	3	3	15	14	+1	2	1	5	9	14	−5

Last updated: 6 November 2011.
Source: Apertura 2011 results

==== Results by round ====
Round	1	2	3	4	5	6	7	8	9	10	11	12	13	14	15	16	17
Ground	H	A	H	A	H	A	H	A	H	A	H	H	A	H	A	H	A
Result	L	L	W	L	L	L	W	W	W	W	L	D	L	D	L	D	L
Position	15	18	13	15	18	18	15	14	11	6	11	11	12	13	15	14	14

Updated to match(es) played on 6 November 2011. Source: Apertura 2011 results and mediotiempo.com
A = Away; H = Home; W = Win; D = Draw; L = Loss

== Transfers ==
=== In ===
#	Pos	Nat	Player	Age	From	Date	Notes
	GK	(Mexico)	Armando Navarrete	31	América	November 26, 2011	.
	MF	(Ecuador)	Michael Arroyo	24	San Luis	November 27, 2011	
	DF	(Ecuador)	Jorge Guagua	30	(Ecuador) LDU Quito	December 1, 2011	
	DF	(Mexico)	Ricardo Jiménez	27	Atlas	December 3, 2011	
	FW	(Mexico)	Hebert Alférez	23	(Croatia) HNK Rijeka	December 13, 2011	
	FW	(Peru)	Andrés Mendoza	33	(United States) Columbus Crew	December 13, 2011	

=== Out ===
#	Pos	Nat	Player	Age	To	Date	Notes
23	GK	(Mexico)	Moisés Muñoz	31	América	November 18, 2011	
19	DF	(Mexico)	Diego Ordaz	27	San Luis	November 25, 2011	
10	MF	(Mexico)	Christian Bermúdez	24	América	November 26, 2011	
9	FW	(Venezuela)	Giancarlo Maldonado	29	Atlas	December 3, 2011	
33	MF	(Argentina)	Matías Córdoba	27	TBD	December 10, 2011	
5	DF	(Argentina)	Nicolás Torres	28	TBD	December 10, 2011	

== Torneo Clausura ==
=== Squad ===
Note: Flags indicate national team as defined under FIFA eligibility rules; some limited exceptions apply. Players may hold more than one non-FIFA nationality.

No.	Pos.	Nation	Player
1	GK	MEX	Antonio Pérez
2	DF	ECU	Jorge Guagua
3	MF	MEX	Alex Diego
4	DF	MEX	Luis Gerardo Venegas
6	DF	MEX	Alfonso Luna
7	MF	MEX	Jorge Hernández
8	MF	PAR	Osvaldo Martínez
9	FW	PER	Andrés Mendoza
10	FW	ECU	Michael Arroyo
11	FW	MEX	Mario Ortiz
13	MF	MEX	Óscar Ricardo Rojas
14	FW	MEX	Francisco Fonseca
15	DF	MEX	Arturo Muñoz
16	MF	USA	Sonny Guadarrama

No.	Pos.	Nation	Player
17	DF	MEX	José Daniel Guerrero (Captain)
18	MF	ARG	Juan Cuevas
19	DF	MEX	Ricardo Jiménez
20	FW	MEX	Hebert Alférez
21	DF	MEX	Luis Velázquez
22	MF	MEX	Eduardo Arce
24	GK	MEX	Alejandro Arredondo
25	DF	MEX	Óscar Vera
28	FW	MEX	Jerónimo Amione
30	GK	MEX	Armando Navarrete
33	DF	MEX	Gabriel Rojo de la Vega
34	MF	MEX	Fernando Herrera
35	FW	MEX	Sergio Nápoles

=== Regular season ===
Win Draw Loss

==== Clausura 2012 results ====
January 7, 2012 Round 1	Guadalajara	0–1	Atlante	Estadio Omnilife, Zapopan
19:00	Araujo (red card) 90'	Report	Guagua (yellow card) 37'; Arroyo 44'; Vera (yellow card) 54'; Guerrero (yellow card) 71'; Fonseca (yellow card) 90+2'	Referee: Ricardo Arellano

January 14, 2012 Round 2	Atlante	1–2	Santos Laguna	Estadio Andrés Quintana Roo, Cancún
21:00	Ricón (yellow card) 43'; Mendoza 52'; Arroyo (yellow card) 75'	Report	Suarez 13'; Quintero (yellow card) 41'; Peralta 56'; Salinas (yellow card) 59'; Sánchez (yellow card) 88'	Referee: Mauricio Morales

January 22, 2012 Round 3	Puebla	1–2	Atlante	Estadio Cuauhtémoc, Puebla
12:00	Lacerda (yellow card) 14'; Landín (yellow card) 34'; Luis García 72'; Pineda (yellow card) 89'	Report	Rojas (yellow card) 13'; Rincón (yellow card) 29'; Martínez 38'; Guagua (yellow card) 45+'; Mendoza 70', (yellow card) 84'; Castillo (yellow card) 77'	Referee: Jorge Antonio Pérez

January 28, 2012 Round 4	Atlante	2–2	Cruz Azul	Estadio Andrés Quintana Roo, Cancún
21:00	Guagua (yellow card) 27'; Martínez 68'; Hernández (yellow card) 73'; Arroyo (yellow card) 78'; Cuevas 85' (pen.)	Report	Villa 17', 86'; Gutiérrez (yellow card) 39'	Referee: Fernando Guerrero

February 4, 2012 Round 5	Querétaro	2–3	Atlante	Estadio Corregidora, Querétaro
17:00	Vitti (yellow card) 41', (goal) 57'; Alemanno 47'; Zamarripa (yellow card) 90'	Report	Vera (yellow card) 33'; Guerrero (yellow card) 36'; Martínez 48', 90+1'; Cuevas 66'	Referee: Erim Ramírez

February 11, 2012 Round 6	Atlante	0–2	Toluca	Estadio Andrés Quintana Roo, Cancún
21:00	Cuevas (yellow card) 26'; Martínez (yellow card) 48'; Arroyo (yellow card) 78'; Rojas (yellow card) 81'	Report	Alonso 2', 32'; Gamboa (yellow card) 83'	Referee: Ricardo Arellano

February 17, 2012 Round 7	Estudiantes Tecos	2–1	Atlante	Estadio Tres de Marzo, Zapopan
20:10	Lillingston 14', (yellow card) 83'; Leaño 31'; Pérez (yellow card) 35'; Alatorre (yellow card) 75'; Martínez (yellow card) 90+2'	Report	Solis (yellow card) 11'; Amione (yellow card) 14'; Arroyo 24'; Jiménez (yellow card) 55'; Guerrero (red card) 90+3'; Martínez (yellow card) 90+3'	Referee: Roberto García Orozco

February 25, 2012 Round 8	Atlante	0–4	América	Estadio Quintana Roo, Cancún
21:00	Castillo (yellow card) 19' (yellow-red card) 78'; Arroyo (yellow card) 49'	Report	Molina 3', (yellow card) 38'; Benítez 27' (pen.), 57'; Mosquera (yellow card) 31'; Vizcarrondo 81'	Referee: Mauricio Morales

March 3, 2012 Round 9	UANL	1–0	Atlante	Estadio Universitario, San Nicolás
19:00	Lobos 13'; Juninho (yellow card) 22'; Pulido (yellow card) 71'	Report	Venegas (yellow card) 24'; Guagua (yellow card) 62'; Hernández (yellow card) 79'; Fonseca (yellow card) 89'	Referee: Miguel Ángel Chacón

March 10, 2012 Round 10	Atlante	0–0	Atlas	Estadio Andrés Quintana Roo, Cancún
21:00	Rojas (yellow card) 7'; Muñoz (yellow card) 39'; Venegas (yellow card) 49'; Navarrete (yellow card) 90+1'; Arroyo (yellow card) 90+2'	Report	Rodríguez (yellow card) 14'; Gutiérrez (yellow card) 60'; Romero (yellow card) 86'; Maldonado (yellow card) 87'	Referee: Fabricio Morales

March 17, 2012 Round 11	Pachuca	3–2	Atlante	Estadio Hidalgo, Pachuca
19:00	Cejas 4' (pen.), 7', 90', (yellow card) 64'; Ayoví (yellow card) 12'; López (yellow card) 19'; Arreola (yellow card) 40'; Castillo (yellow card) 85'	Report	Hernández (yellow card) 3'; Cuevas 34'; Rincón (yellow card) 43'; Guagua 48', (red card) 55'	Referee: Marco Antonio Rodríguez

March 24, 2012 Round 12	San Luis	2–3	Atlante	Estadio Alfonso Lastras, San Luis Potosí
20:45	Chávez 32'; Torres (yellow card) 65'; Paredes (yellow card) 71'; Villaluz 86'	Report	Martínez 27', 51'; Vera (yellow card) 42' (yellow-red card) 84'; Hernández (yellow card) 52'; Arroyo 81'	Referee: Jorge Gasso

March 31, 2012 Round 13	Atlante	2–2	Chiapas	Estadio Andrés Quintana Roo, Cancún
21:00	Jiménez (yellow card) 5'; Cuevas (yellow card) 22'; Hernández (yellow card) 44'; Muñoz (red card) 47'; Arroyo 60'; Fonseca 82'	Report	J. Martínez (yellow card) 5'; Ruiz (yellow card) 19'; Rey 28', (yellow card) 52'; Andrade 63'; M. Martínez (yellow card) 83'	Referee: Miguel Ángel Ortega

April 8, 2012 Round 14	Tijuana	2–1	Atlante	Estadio Caliente, Tijuana
12:00	Tahuilán 13'; Corona 19'; Castillo (yellow card) 31'; Gandolfi (yellow card) 55'	Report	Rojas (yellow card) 23'; Arroyo (yellow card) 33'; Fonseca 60'; Mendoza (yellow card) 78'	Referee: Jorge Antonio Pérez

April 14, 2012 Round 15	Atlante	1–2	UNAM	Estadio Andrés Quintana Roo, Cancún
21:00	Cuevas 9'; Amione (yellow card) 89'	Report	Jiménez 7' (o.g.); Campos (yellow card) 14'; Espinoza (yellow card) 30'; Orrantía 72'; García (yellow card) 81'; Cortés (yellow card) 90+3'	Referee: Mauricio Morales

April 20, 2012 Round 16	Morelia	1–1	Atlante	Estadio Morelos, Morelia
21:00	Aldrete (yellow card) 61'; Huiqui 90'	Report	Fonseca 56'; Jiménez (yellow card) 58'; Rojas (yellow card) 90+4'	Referee: Francisco Chacón

April 28, 2012 Round 17	Atlante	0–3	Monterrey	Estadio Andrés Quintana Roo, Cancún
21:00	Venegas (yellow card) 53'; Luna (yellow card) 60'; Guerrero (yellow card) 84'; Martínez (yellow card) 84'	Report	Carreño 1'; Suazo 56', 76'; Ayoví (yellow card) 71'	Referee: Miguel Ángel Chacón

Atlante did not qualify to the Final Phase

=== Goalscorers ===
Position	Nation	Name	Goals scored
1.	(Ecuador)	Michael Arroyo	5
1.	(Paraguay)	Osvaldo Martínez	5
3.	(Argentina)	Juan Cuevas	3
3.	(Mexico)	Francisco Fonseca	2
5.	(Peru)	Andrés Mendoza	2
6.	(Ecuador)	Jorge Guagua	1
6.	(Mexico)	José Daniel Guerrero	1
TOTAL			20

=== Results ===
==== Results summary ====
Overall								Home						Away					
Pld	W	D	L	GF	GA	GD	Pts	W	D	L	GF	GA	GD	W	D	L	GF	GA	GD
17	4	5	8	20	31	−11	17	0	4	4	6	17	−11	4	1	4	14	14	0

Last updated: 28 April 2012.
Source: Clausura 2012 results

==== Results by round ====
Round	1	2	3	4	5	6	7	8	9	10	11	12	13	14	15	16	17
Ground	A	H	A	H	A	H	A	H	A	H	A	A	H	A	H	A	H
Result	W	L	W	D	W	L	L	L	L	D	L	W	D	L	L	D	L
Position	4	12	4	4	2	8	10	11	12	13	14	12	12	13	15	13	14

Updated to match(es) played on 29 April 2012. Source: Clausura 2012 results and mediotiempo.com
A = Away; H = Home; W = Win; D = Draw; L = Loss
