= 2010–11 Atlante F.C. season =

The 2010–11 Atlante season was the 64th professional season of Mexico's top-flight football league. The season is split into two tournaments—the Torneo Apertura and the Torneo Clausura—each with identical formats and each contested by the same eighteen teams. Atlante began the season on July 24, 2010 against Santos Laguna, Atlante played their home games on Saturdays at 9:00pm local time.

== Torneo Apertura ==
=== Squad ===
Note: Flags indicate national team as defined under FIFA eligibility rules; some limited exceptions apply. Players may hold more than one non-FIFA nationality.

No.	Pos.	Nation	Player
1	GK	MEX	Antonio Pérez
2	DF	PAR	Líder Mármol
4	DF	MEX	Luis Gerardo Venegas
5	DF	MEX	Óscar Recio
6	MF	MEX	Edgar Iván Solís
7	MF	MEX	Fernando Navarro
8	MF	MEX	Alex Diego
9	FW	MEX	Ulises Mendivil
10	FW	PER	Johan Fano
11	MF	ARG	Sebastián Nayar
13	MF	URU	Mathías Cardaccio
15	DF	MEX	Arturo Muñoz
16	FW	USA	Sonny Guadarrama
17	DF	MEX	José Daniel Guerrero
18	MF	MEX	Christian Bermúdez
19	MF	ARG	Nicolás Torres

No.	Pos.	Nation	Player
20	MF	MEX	Andrés Carević
21	DF	MEX	Luis David Velázquez
23	DF	MEX	Gerardo Castillo
24	DF	MEX	Pedro Beltrán
26	DF	MEX	Clemente Ovalle
27	DF	MEX	Hugo Emiliano Chávez
28	FW	MEX	Jerónimo Arturo Amione
29	FW	MEX	Luis Ángel Landín
30	GK	MEX	Moisés Muñoz
33	GK	MEX	Román Fuente
34	MF	MEX	Saúl García
35	GK	MEX	Allan Van Rankin
35	FW	MEX	Jesús Morales
48	DF	MEX	Alejandro Mercado
54	FW	MEX	Edwin Borboa
79	FW	MEX	Sergio Nápoles

=== Apertura 2010 results ===
==== Regular season ====
All times are in Central Standard Time

July 24, 2010 Round 1	Atlante	1–4	Santos Laguna	Estadio Andrés Quintana Roo, Cancún
9:00pm	Solari 52' (pen.)	Report	Benítez 28', 89'; Ludueña 40'; Morales 87'	Referee: Francisco Chacón

July 31, 2010 Round 2	Cruz Azul	2–0	Atlante	Estadio Azul, Mexico City
5:00pm	Vela 30'; Villa 73'	Report		Referee: Miguel Ángel Chacón

August 7, 2010 Round 3	Atlante	1–2	Monterrey	Estadio Andrés Quintana Roo, Cancún
9:00pm	Fano 3'	Report	Basanta 13'; Cardozo 52'	Referee: Román Rafael Medina

August 15, 2010 Round 4	Puebla	1–1	Atlante	Estadio Cuauhtémoc, Puebla
12:00pm	Amione 51'	Report	Lugo 85'	Referee: Jaime Herrera Garduño

August 21, 2010 Round 5	Atlante	2–1	Guadalajara	Estadio Andrés Quintana Roo, Cancún
9:00pm	Torres 4'; Fano 36'	Report	Bravo 1'	Referee: Paul Enrique Delgadillo Haro

August 28, 2010 Round 6	San Luis	2–1	Atlante	Estadio Alfonso Lastras, San Luis Potosí
8:45pm	Aguirre 26'; González 89'	Report	Cardaccio 38'	Referee: Miguel Ángel Ayala

September 11, 2010 Round 7	Atlante	0–1	Estudiantes Tecos	Estadio Andrés Quintana Roo, Cancún
9:00pm		Report	Ramírez 86'	Referee: Fabricio Morales

September 18, 2010 Round 8	Atlante	2–0	Morelia	Estadio Andrés Quintana Roo, Cancún
9:00pm	Carevic 63'; Fano 82'	Report		Referee: Jorge Eduardo Gasso

September 26, 2010 Round 9	UNAM	2–2	Atlante	Estadio Olímpico Universitario, Mexico City
12:00pm	Bravo 23', 53'	Report	Fano 72', 74' (pen.)	Referee: Roberto García

October 2, 2010 Round 10	Atlante	1–3	Pachuca	Estadio Andrés Quintana Roo, Cancún
9:00pm	Fano 18'	Report	Benítez 46', 59'; Cvitanich 90'	Referee: Armando Archundia

October 9, 2010 Round 11	Chiapas	2–0	Atlante	Estadio Victor Manuel Reyna, Tuxtla Gutierrez
5:00pm	Rodríguez 36'; Danilinho 76'	Report		Referee: Miguel Ángel Ortega

October 16, 2010 Round 12	Atlante	1–1	UANL	Estadio Andrés Quintana Roo, Cancún
9:00pm	Fano 10'	Report	Carevic 47' (o.g.)	Referee: Jorge Gasso

October 23, 2010 Round 13	Atlas	3–1	Atlante	Estadio Jalisco, Guadalajara
8:45pm	Moreno 20' (pen.), 70'; Espinoza 48'	Report	Bermúdez 59'	Referee: Marco Antonio Rodríguez

October 27, 2010 Round 14	Atlante	1–0	Querétaro	Estadio Andrés Quintana Roo, Cancún
9:00pm	Fano 53'	Report		Referee: Mauricio Morales

October 31, 2010 Round 15	Necaxa	1–2	Atlante	Estadio Victoria, Aguascalientes
5:00pm	Pérez 61'	Report	Amione 70'; Fano 74'	Referee: Miguel Ángel Flores

November 6, 2010 Round 16	Atlante	0–1	América	Estadio Andrés Quintana Roo, Cancún
9:00pm		Report	Vuoso 65'	Referee: Paul Delgadillo

November 14, 2010 Round 17	Toluca	1–1	Atlante	Estadio Nemesio Díez, Toluca
12:00pm	Ríos 68'	Report	Amione 46'	Referee: Roberto García

=== Goalscorers ===
Position	Nation	Name	Goals scored
1	(Peru)	Johan Fano	9
2	(Mexico)	Jerónimo Amione	3
3	(Mexico)	Christian Bermúdez	1
3	(Uruguay)	Mathías Cardaccio	1
3	(Argentina)	Andrés Carevic	1
3	(Mexico)	Édgar Lugo	1
3	(Argentina)	Nicolás Torres	1
3	(Argentina)	Santiago Solari	1
TOTAL			17

=== Transfers ===
==== In ====
#	Pos	Player	From
2	DF	(Paraguay) Líder Mármol	(Argentina) San Martín de San Juan
6	MF	(Mexico) Edgar Solís	(Mexico) Chivas de Guadalajara
8	MF	(Mexico) Alex Diego	(Mexico) Pumas Morelos (on loan)
9	FW	(Mexico) Ulises Mendivil	(Mexico) C.F. Pachuca
11	MF	(Argentina) Sebastián Nayar	(Colombia) Deportivo Cali
13	MF	(Uruguay) Mathías Cardaccio	(Argentina) Club Atlético Banfield
16	MF	(United States) Sonny Guadarrama	(Mexico) Mérida F.C.
19	DF	(Argentina) Nicolás Torres	(Argentina) Club Atlético Colón
29	FW	(Mexico) Luis Angel Landin	(United States) Houston Dynamo
30	GK	(Mexico) Moisés Muñoz	(Mexico) Monarcas Morelia
	MAN	(Argentina) Eduardo Bacas	(Mexico) Potros Neza

==== Out ====
#	Pos	Player	To
1	GK	(Mexico) Gerardo Daniel Ruiz	(Mexico) Chiapas
2	DF	(Argentina) Miguel Ángel Martínez	(Mexico) Chiapas
3	GK	(Argentina) Federico Vilar	(Mexico) Monarcas Morelia
5	MF	(Mexico) José Joel González	(Mexico) Puebla F.C.
8	FW	(Mexico) Rafael Márquez Lugo	(Mexico) Monarcas Morelia
9	FW	(Venezuela) Giancarlo Maldonado	(United States) Chivas USA
11	MF	(Argentina) Santiago Solari	(Uruguay) C.A. Peñarol
31	MF	(Mexico) Daniel Arreola	(Mexico) C.F. Pachuca
–	MF	(Argentina) Gabriel Pereyra	(Mexico) Puebla F.C.
	MAN	(Mexico) René Isidoro García	Released

=== Results ===
==== Results summary ====
Overall								Home						Away					
Pld	W	D	L	GF	GA	GD	Pts	W	D	L	GF	GA	GD	W	D	L	GF	GA	GD
17	4	4	9	17	27	−10	16	3	1	5	9	13	−4	1	3	4	8	14	−6

Last updated: 30 December 2010.
Source: Regular season

==== Results by round ====
Round	1	2	3	4	5	6	7	8	9	10	11	12	13	14	15	16	17
Ground	H	A	H	A	H	A	H	H	A	H	A	H	A	H	A	H	A
Result	L	L	L	D	W	L	L	W	D	L	L	D	L	W	W	L	D
Position	16	18	18	17	15	16	17	16	16	17	18	17	18	17	16	16	16

Updated to match(es) played on 30 December 2010. Source: Regular season and mediotiempo.com
A = Away; H = Home; W = Win; D = Draw; L = Loss

== Torneo Clausura ==
=== Squad ===
Note: Flags indicate national team as defined under FIFA eligibility rules; some limited exceptions apply. Players may hold more than one non-FIFA nationality.

No.	Pos.	Nation	Player
1	GK	MEX	Antonio Pérez
2	DF	PAR	Eder Mármol
4	DF	MEX	Luis Gerardo Venegas
6	MF	MEX	Edgar Solís
7	MF	MEX	Fernando Navarro
8	MF	MEX	Alex Diego
9	FW	VEN	Giancarlo Maldonado
10	FW	PER	Reimond Manco
11	FW	MEX	Mario Ortiz
13	MF	URU	Mathías Cardaccio
14	FW	MEX	Francisco Fonseca
15	MF	MEX	Arturo Muñoz
16	MF	USA	Sonny Guadarrama
17	MF	MEX	José Daniel Guerrero (Captain)
18	MF	MEX	Christian Bermúdez
19	DF	MEX	Diego Ordaz
20	MF	ARG	Andrés Carevic

No.	Pos.	Nation	Player
21	DF	MEX	Luis David Velázquez
22	MF	MEX	Eduardo Arce
23	DF	MEX	Gerardo Castillo
24	MF	MEX	Pedro Luis Beltrán
25	FW	MEX	Edson Jair Jaramillo
26	GK	MEX	Eder Patiño
27	DF	MEX	Hugo Emiliano Rodríguez
28	FW	MEX	Jerónimo Amione
29	FW	MEX	Luis Ángel Landín
30	GK	MEX	Moisés Muñoz
31	MF	MEX	Jorge Hernández
32	MF	MEX	Pablo Gutiérrez
34	GK	MEX	Nicolás Hidalgo
35	FW	CRC	Ever Alfaro
37	MF	MEX	Fernando Herrera
39	FW	MEX	Sergio Javier Nápoles

=== Regular season ===
All times are in Central Standard Time

January 8, 2011 Round 1	Santos Laguna	2–1	Atlante	Estadio Corona, Torreón
7:00pm	Quintero 54'; Benítez 72'	Report	Navarro 81'	Referee: Miguel Ángel Ortega

January 15, 2011 Round 2	Atlante	3–0	Cruz Azul	Estadio Quintana Roo, Cancún
9:00pm	Ponce 55' (o.g.); Bermúdez 71'; Maldonado 75' (pen.)	Report		Referee: Fabricio Morales

January 22, 2011 Round 3	Monterrey	1–0	Atlante	Estadio Tecnologico, Monterrey
5:00pm	Suazo 2'	Report		Referee: Miguel Ángel Flores

January 29, 2011 Round 4	Atlante	2–0	Puebla	Estadio Quintana Roo, Cancún
9:00pm	Corona 39' (o.g.); Bermúdez 88'	Report		Referee: Marco Antonio Rodríguez

February 5, 2011 Round 5	Guadalajara	2–0	Atlante	Estadio Jalisco, Guadalajara
9:00pm	Araujo 87'; Reynoso 90+4' (pen.)	Report		Referee: Mauricio Morales

February 12, 2011 Round 6	Atlante	0–0	San Luis	Estadio Quintana Roo, Cancún
9:00pm		Report		Referee: Jorge Eduardo Gasso

February 18, 2011 Round 7	Estudiantes Tecos	0–1	Atlante	Estadio Tres de Marzo, Zapopan
8:10pm		Report	Bermúdez	Referee: Juan Genaro Medrano

February 27, 2011 Round 8	Morelia	2–1	Atlante	Estadio Morelos, Morelia
12:00pm	Huiqui 75'; Sabah 81'	Report	Bermúdez 49'	Referee: Roberto García Orozco

March 5, 2011 Round 9	Atlante	0–2	UNAM	Estadio Quintana Roo, Cancún
9:00pm		Report	Bravo 22', 28'	Referee: Francisco Chacón

March 12, 2011 Round 10	Pachuca	0–4	Atlante	Estadio Hidalgo, Pachuca
7:00pm		Report	Fonseca 20', 41'; Navarro 22'; Bermúdez 27'	Referee: Mauricio Morales

March 19, 2011 Round 11	Atlante	5–1	Chiapas	Estadio Quintana Roo, Cancún
9:00pm	Bermúdez 19', 50'; Ortiz 30'; Fonseca 34', 78'	Report	Valdéz 90'	Referee: Miguel Ángel Ortega

April 2, 2011 Round 12	UANL	2–0	Atlante	Estadio Universitario, San Nicolás
7:00pm	Molina 54'; Acuña 85'	Report		Referee: Miguel Ángel Flores

April 9, 2011 Round 13	Atlante	3–1	Atlas	Estadio Quintana Roo, Cancún
9:00pm	Foinseca 10'; Pinto 54' (o.g.); Maldonado 75'	Report	Costly 89'	Referee: Paul Delgadillo

April 13, 2011 Round 14	Querétaro	1–4	Atlante	Estadio Corregidora, Querétaro
8:00pm	Bueno 85' (pen.)	Report	Diego 19'; Ortiz 21'; Bermúdez 28'; Amione 63'	Referee: José Alfredo Peñaloza

April 16, 2011 Round 15	Atlante	1–1	Necaxa	Estadio Quintana Roo, Cancún
9:00pm	Bermúdez 75' (pen.)	Report	Ledesma 20'	Referee: Miguel Ángel Ortega

April 24, 2011 Round 16	América	1–1	Atlante	Estadio Azteca, Mexico City
4:00pm	Reyna 35'	Report	Maldonado 38'	Referee: Mauricio Morales

April 30, 2011 Round 17	Atlante	2–1	Toluca	Estadio Quintana Roo, Cancún
9:00pm	Maldonado 8'; Ortiz 74'	Report	Sinha 74'	Referee: Paul Delgadillo

==== Final phase ====
May 4, 2011 Quarterfinals	Cruz Azul	2–1	Atlante	Estadio Azul, Mexico City
9:00pm	Giménez 18', 46'	Report	Maldonado 7'	Referee: Miguel Ángel Ortega

May 7, 2011 Quarterfinals	Atlante	0–0	Cruz Azul	Estadio Quintana Roo, Cancún
9:00pm		Report		Referee: Roberto García Orozco

Cruz Azul won 2–1 on aggregate

=== Friendlies ===
February 9, 2011	Atlante (Mexico)	0–0 (3–4 p)	(United States) New York	Andrés Quintana Roo, Cancún, Mexico
21:00		(Report)	(yellow card) 44' Solli; (yellow card) 73' Ibrahim	Attendance: 6,002; Referee: Ricardo Arellano
	Penalties
	Maldonado (penalty scored); Landín (penalty scored); Ortiz (penalty missed); Fonseca (penalty scored); Muñoz (penalty missed); Guadarrama (penalty missed)		(penalty scored) Lassiter; (penalty scored) Hertzog; (penalty missed) Robinson; (penalty missed) Rooney; (penalty scored) Ibrahim; (penalty scored) da Luz

=== Goalscorers ===
Position	Nation	Name	Goals scored
1	(Mexico)	Christian Bermúdez	9
2	(Mexico)	Francisco Fonseca	5
2	(Venezuela)	Giancarlo Maldonado	5
4	(Mexico)	Mario Ortiz	3
4		Own Goal	3
6	(Mexico)	Fernando Navarro	2
7	(Mexico)	Jerónimo Amione	1
7	(Mexico)	Alex Diego	1
TOTAL			29

=== Results ===
==== Results summary ====
Overall								Home						Away					
Pld	W	D	L	GF	GA	GD	Pts	W	D	L	GF	GA	GD	W	D	L	GF	GA	GD
17	8	3	6	28	15	+13	27	5	2	1	16	6	+10	3	1	5	12	9	+3

Last updated: 6 May 2011.
Source: Clausura 2010 results

==== Results by round ====
Round	1	2	3	4	5	6	7	8	9	10	11	12	13	14	15	16	17
Ground	A	H	A	H	A	H	A	A	H	A	H	A	H	A	H	A	H
Result	L	W	L	W	L	D	W	L	L	W	W	L	W	W	D	D	W
Position	13	7	12	8	9	11	10	10	12	10	6	8	7	6	6	6	4

Updated to match(es) played on 6 May 2011. Source: Clausura 2010 results and mediotiempo.com
A = Away; H = Home; W = Win; D = Draw; L = Loss
