= 2012–13 Toluca FC season =

Toluca
2012–13 season
- Chairman: Fernando Corona
- Manager: Enrique Meza
- Stadium: Estadio Nemesio Díez
- Apertura 2012: 1st Runners-up
- Clausura 2013: 13th
- Copa MX (Apertura): Quarter-finals
- Copa Libertadores: Group stage
- Top goalscorer: League: Apertura: Lucas Silva (7); Clausura: Lucas Silva (5); All: Édgar Benítez (15)
- Highest home attendance: Apertura: 20,818 vs América (September 2, 2012); Clausura: 12,678 vs Atlas (March 10, 2013)
- Lowest home attendance: Apertura: 7,899 vs Querétaro (October 3, 2012); Clausura: 8,863 vs Chiapas (February 24, 2013)
| Home colours | Away colours |

The 2012–13 Toluca season was the 66th professional season of Mexico's top-flight football league. The season is split into two tournaments—the Torneo Apertura and the Torneo Clausura—each with identical formats and each contested by the same eighteen teams. Toluca began their season on July 22, 2012 against Guadalajara, Toluca played their homes games on Sundays at 12:00pm local time. Toluca was runner-up in the final phase in the Apertura tournament losing the final to Tijuana, while they did not qualify to the final phase in the Clausura tournament.

== Torneo Apertura ==
=== Squad ===
Note: Flags indicate national team as defined under FIFA eligibility rules; some limited exceptions apply. Players may hold more than one non-FIFA nationality.

| No. | Pos. | Nation | Player |
|---|---|---|---|
| 1 | GK | MEX | Alfredo Talavera |
| 2 | DF | ARG | Diego Novaretti |
| 3 | DF | MEX | Marvin Cabrera |
| 4 | DF | MEX | Francisco Gamboa |
| 5 | MF | BRA | Wilson Mathías |
| 6 | MF | MEX | Carlos Gerardo Rodríguez |
| 7 | FW | PAR | Édgar Benítez |
| 8 | MF | BRA | Lucas Silva |
| 9 | FW | MEX | Juan Carlos Cacho |
| 10 | MF | MEX | Sinha (Captain) |
| 11 | FW | MEX | Carlos Esquivel |
| 12 | GK | MEX | Miguel Ángel Centeno |
| 13 | DF | MEX | Héctor Acosta |
| 14 | DF | MEX | Édgar Dueñas |

| No. | Pos. | Nation | Player |
|---|---|---|---|
| — | DF | MEX | Manuel de la Torre |
| 15 | MF | MEX | Antonio Ríos |
| 16 | DF | MEX | Carlos Alberto Galeana |
| 17 | FW | MEX | Arturo Tapia |
| 18 | FW | MEX | Isaác Brizuela |
| 19 | FW | MEX | Edy Germán Brambila |
| 20 | DF | MEX | Jesús Arturo Paganoni |
| 21 | MF | MEX | Gabriel Velasco |
| 25 | DF | MEX | José Manuel Cruzalta |
| 26 | MF | MEX | Ervín Alejandro Trejo |
| 27 | GK | MEX | Ernesto Sánchez |
| 28 | FW | MEX | Arturo Tapia |
| 29 | MF | MEX | Juan José Calderón |
| 30 | GK | USA | Josúe González |

=== Regular season ===
Win Draw Loss

==== Apertura 2012 results ====
| July 22, 2012 Round 1 | Toluca | 2–1 | Guadalajara | Toluca, Estado de Mexico |
| 12:00 | Esquivel 3'; Cacho 32'; Wilson Mathías (yellow card) 57' | Report | Márquez 67'; Araujo (yellow card) 79' | Stadium: Estadio Nemesio Díez; Referee: Francisco Chacón |

| July 29, 2012 Round 2 | Puebla | 1–3 | Toluca | Puebla, Puebla |
| 12:00 | Toloza 33'; Miranda (yellow card) 43' (yellow-red card) 73'; Gatélum (yellow card) 90' | Report | Lucas Silva (yellow card) 18', (goal) 22', 64'; Ríos (yellow card) 25'; Wilson Mathías 44' | Stadium: Estadio Cuauhtémoc; Referee: Victor Bisguera Mendiola |

| August 5, 2012 Round 3 | Toluca | 2–1 | León | Toluca, Estado de Mexico |
| 12:00 | Lucas Silva 15'; Rodríguez (yellow card) 24'; Cabrera (yellow card) 28'; Sinha 38'; Novaretti (yellow card) 88' | Report | Loboa 45+' | Stadium: Estadio Nemesio Díez; Attendance: 18,021; Referee: Jorge Antonio Pérez |

| August 12, 2012 Round 4 | UNAM | 1–2 | Toluca | Mexico City |
| 12:00 | Luis García 37', (yellow card) 75'; García (yellow card) 57' | Report | Cacho 12'; Rodríguez 59' (pen.); Cabrera (yellow card) 65'; Talavera (yellow card) 72' | Stadium: Estadio Olímpico Universitario; Attendance: 23,017; Referee: Fabricio Morales |

| August 19, 2012 Round 5 | Toluca | 1–0 | Pachuca | Toluca, Estado de Mexico |
| 12:00 | Sinha (yellow card) 68'; Benítez 90+1' | Report | S. Castillo (yellow card) 62' | Stadium: Estadio Nemesio Díez; Attendance: 11,259; Referee: Mauricio Morales |

| August 25, 2012 Round 6 | UANL | 1–1 | Toluca | San Nicolás de los Garza, Nuevo León |
| 19:00 | Lobos 11', (yellow card) 59'; Juninho (yellow card) 57'; Álvarez (yellow card) 90+4' | Report | Lucas Silva 6'; Novaretti (yellow card) 52' | Stadium: Estadio Universitario; Attendance: 39,321; Referee: Roberto García Orozco |

| September 2, 2012 Round 7 | Toluca | 1–1 | América | Toluca, Estado de México |
| 12:00 | Novaretti (yellow card) 32'; Rodríguez 71' (pen.) | Report | Molina (red card) 37'; Sambueza 67'; Mosquera (yellow card) 69'; Medina (yellow card) 69'; Aldrete (yellow card) 72' | Stadium: Estadio Nemesio Díez; Attendance: 20,818; Referee: José Alfredo Peñaloza |

| September 14, 2012 Round 8 | Chiapas | 2–0 | Toluca | Tuxtla Gutiérrez, Chiapas |
| 19:30 | Rodríguez 55', 78' | Report | | Stadium: Estadio Victor Manuel Reyna; Referee: Marco Antonio Rodríguez |

| September 23, 2012 Round 9 | Toluca | 1–0 | Atlante | Toluca, Estado de México |
| 12:00 | Wilson Mathías (yellow card) 20'; Tejada (yellow card) 71', (goal) 83' | Report | Rojas (yellow card) 50'; Calvo (yellow card) 85' | Stadium: Estadio Nemesio Díez; Attendance: 9,487; Referee: Luis Enrique Santander |

| September 29, 2012 Round 10 | Atlas | 1–3 | Toluca | Guadalajara, Jalisco |
| 21:00 | Bolaños (yellow card) 58'; Mancilla 83', (yellow card) 86' | Report | Tejada (yellow card) 14', (goal) 24'; Sinha 19'; Wilson Mathías 90+4' | Stadium: Estadio Jalisco; Attendance: 31,384; Referee: Fabricio Morales |

| October 3, 2012 Round 11 | Toluca | 4–1 | Querétaro | Toluca, Estado de Mexico |
| 19:00 | Tejada 4', 45+1', (yellow card) 24'; Sinha 43'; Ríos (yellow card) 64'; Cacho 77' | Report | Pineda 15'; Cortés (yellow card) 17' | Stadium: Estadio Nemesio Díez; Attendance: 7,899; Referee: Antony Zanjuampa |

| October 7, 2012 Round 12 | Tijuana | 1–0 | Toluca | Tijuana, Baja California |
| 18:00 | Gandolfi (yellow card) 4'; Pellerano (yellow card) 36'; Riascos 50'; Martínez (yellow card) 82'; Aguilar (yellow card) 90+2' | Report | Tejada (yellow card) 34'; Sinha (yellow card) 57' (yellow-red card) 73'; Lucas Silva (yellow card) 74' | Stadium: Estadio Caliente; Attendance: 22,333; Referee: José Alfredo Peñaloza |

| November 7, 2012 Round 13 | Monterrey | 2–2 | Toluca | Monterrey, Nuevo León |
| 20:30 | Suazo 1', 75' (pen.); Basanta (yellow card) 29' (yellow-red card) 62' | Report | Rodríguez 20' (pen.), (yellow card) 36'; Benítez 23'; Dueñas (yellow card) 90' | Stadium: Estadio Tecnológico; Attendance: 28,060; Referee: Francisco Chacón |

| October 21, 2012 Round 14 | Toluca | 4–1 | Santos Laguna | Toluca, Estado de Mexico |
| 12:00 | Wilson Mathías 10'; Ríos 28'; Benítez (red card) 30'; Tejada 64'; Talavera (yellow card) 71'; Cacho (yellow card) 73'; Lucas Silva 76'; Esquivel (yellow card) 81' | Report | Ludueña (yellow card) 35'; Alanis (yellow card) 49'; Peralta 69' | Stadium: Estadio Nemesio Díez; Referee: Óscar Macias |

| October 27, 2012 Round 15 | Cruz Azul | 3–0 | Toluca | Mexico City |
| 17:00 | Flores 11'; Aquino 35'; Pavone (yellow card) 42', (goal) 74' | Report | Tejada (yellow card) 31'; Rodríguez (yellow card) 37'; Novaretti (yellow card) 47' | Stadium: Estadio Azul; Attendance: 25,895; Referee: Miguel Ángel Flores |

| November 4, 2012 Round 16 | Toluca | 0–0 | Morelia | Toluca, Estado de Mexico |
| 12:00 | Sinha (yellow card) 29'; Cacho (yellow card) 63'; Dueñas (yellow card) 70' | Report | Valdéz (yellow card) 27'; Álvarez (yellow card) 31'; Romero (yellow card) 33'; Montero (yellow card) 69' | Stadium: Estadio Nemesio Díez; Attendance: 10,732; Referee: Miguel Ángel Ayala |

| October 27, 2012 Round 17 | San Luis | 0–2 | Toluca | San Luis Potosí, San Luis Potosí |
| 21:00 | | Report | Rodríguez 65'; Tejada 73' | Stadium: Estadio Alfonso Lastras; Attendance: 7,572; Referee: Ricardo Arellano |

==== Final phase ====
| November 15, 2012 Quarter-finals | Guadalajara | 1–2 | Toluca | Zapopan, Jalisco |
| 21:00 | Márquez 74' (pen.); Arellano (yellow card) 90+1'; Morales (yellow card) 90+2' | Report | Ríos 24'; Sinha 29'; Tejada (yellow card) 63'; Novatetti (yellow card) 68'; Talavera (yellow card) 73'; Rodríguez (yellow card) 81'; Benítez (yellow card) 90+2' | Stadium: Estadio Omnilife; Attendance: 23,189; Referee: Fernando Guerrero |

| November 18, 2012 Quarter-finals | Toluca | 3–1 | Guadalajara | Toluca, Estado de México |
| 12:00 | Cabrera (yellow card) 30'; Sinha (yellow card) 39'; Wilson Mathías 56'; Lucas Silva 58'; Cacho 71' | Report | Araujo (yellow card) 65'; Morales (yellow card) 67'; Torres 81' | Stadium: Estadio Nemesio Díez; Attendance: 19,575; Referee: Fabricio Morales |

Toluca advanced 5–2 on aggregate

| November 22, 2012 Semi-finals | América | 0–2 | Toluca | Coyoacán, Mexico City |
| 19:00 | Mosquera (yellow card) 25'; Medina (yellow card) 49'; Reyes (yellow card) 54' | Report | Sinha (yellow card) 9'; Tejada (yellow card) 17'; Lucas Silva 54'; Ríos (yellow card) 56'; Rodríguez (yellow card) 86'; Benítez 90' | Stadium: Estadio Azteca; Attendance: 85,515; Referee: Jorge Antonio Pérez |

| November 25, 2012 Semi-finals | Toluca | 1–2 | América | Toluca, Estado de México |
| 12:00 | Benítez 59', (yellow card) 71'; Talavera (yellow card) 61'; Tejada (yellow card) 90+5' | Report | Layún 15'; Sambueza (yellow card) 30'; Montenegro 36'; Aguilar (yellow card) 46'; Medina (red card) 90+5' | Stadium: Estadio Nemesio Díez; Attendance: 19,539; Referee: Roberto García Orozco |

Toluca advanced 3–2 on aggregate

| November 29, 2012 Final | Tijuana | 2–1 | Toluca | Tijuana, Baja California |
| 19:00 | Martínez 23'; Aguilar 39'; Pellerano (yellow card) 41'; Arce (yellow card) 83' | Report | Benítez 26'; Sinha (yellow card) 41'; Talavera (yellow card) 81' | Stadium: Estadio Caliente; Attendance: 22,333; Referee: Roberto García Orozco |

| December 2, 2012 Final | Toluca | 0–2 | Tijuana | Toluca, Estado de México |
| 18:00 | Esquivel (yellow card) 7'; Novaretti (yellow card) 68' | Report | Ruiz 69'; Riascos 70', (yellow card) 71'; Martínez (yellow card) 86' | Stadium: Estadio Nemesio Díez; Referee: Francisco Chacón |

Tijuana won 4–1 on aggregate

=== Goalscorers ===
==== Regular season ====
| Position | Nation | Name | Goals scored |
|---|---|---|---|
| 1. | (Panama) | Luis Tejada | 6 |
| 2. | (Brazil) | Lucas Silva | 5 |
| 3. | (Mexico) | Carlos Gerardo Rodríguez | 4 |
| 4. | (Mexico) | Juan Carlos Cacho | 3 |
| 4. | (Brazil) | Wilson Mathías | 3 |
| 4. | (Mexico) | Sinha | 3 |
| 7. | (Paraguay) | Édgar Benítez | 2 |
| 8. | (Mexico) | Carlos Esquivel | 1 |
| 8. | (Mexico) | Antonio Ríos | 1 |
| TOTAL | | | 28 |

==== Final phase ====
| Position | Nation | Name | Goals scored |
|---|---|---|---|
| 1. | (Paraguay) | Édgar Benítez | 3 |
| 2. | (Brazil) | Lucas Silva | 2 |
| 3. | (Mexico) | Juan Carlos Cacho | 1 |
| 3. | (Brazil) | Wilson Mathías | 1 |
| 3. | (Mexico) | Sinha | 1 |
| 3. | (Mexico) | Antonio Ríos | 1 |
| TOTAL | | | 9 |

=== Results ===
==== Results summary ====
| Overall | | | | | | | | Home | | | | | | Away | | | | | |
| Pld | W | D | L | GF | GA | GD | Pts | W | D | L | GF | GA | GD | W | D | L | GF | GA | GD |
|---|---|---|---|---|---|---|---|---|---|---|---|---|---|---|---|---|---|---|---|
| 17 | 10 | 4 | 3 | 28 | 17 | +11 | 34 | 6 | 2 | 0 | 15 | 5 | +10 | 4 | 2 | 3 | 13 | 12 | +1 |

Last updated: 11 November 2012.
Source: Apertura 2012 results

==== Results by round ====
| Round | 1 | 2 | 3 | 4 | 5 | 6 | 7 | 8 | 9 | 10 | 11 | 12 | 13 | 14 | 15 | 16 | 17 |
|---|---|---|---|---|---|---|---|---|---|---|---|---|---|---|---|---|---|
| Ground | H | A | H | A | H | A | H | A | H | A | H | A | A | H | A | H | A |
| Result | W | W | W | W | W | D | D | L | W | W | W | L | D | W | L | D | W |
| Position | 5 | 3 | 1 | 1 | 1 | 1 | 1 | 2 | 1 | 1 | 1 | 2 | 2 | 1 | 2 | 4 | 1 |

Updated to match(es) played on 11 November 2012. Source: Apertura 2012 results and mediotiempo.com
A = Away; H = Home; W = Win; D = Draw; L = Loss

== Copa MX ==
=== Group stage ===
Win Draw Loss

==== Apertura results ====
| July 24, 2012 1 | Toluca | 1–3 | BUAP | Toluca, Estado de Mexico |
| 21:00 | Benítez 27' | Report | Tehuitzil (yellow card) 25'; Lima 41', 54', 64'; Sánchez (yellow card) 44'; Jiménez (yellow card) 48'; Donsel (yellow card) 81' | Stadium: Estadio Nemesio Díez; Referee: Luis Enrique Santander |

| July 31, 2012 2 | BUAP | 2–2 | Toluca | Puebla, Puebla |
| 21:00 | Bello (yellow card) 11'; Tejada 54'; Íñigo (yellow card) 68'; Gutiérrez 87' | Report | Benítez (yellow card) 30'; Paganoni (yellow card) 37'; Acosta 43'; Rodríguez (yellow card) 52'; Sinha 69' | Stadium: Estadio Olímpico de la BUAP; Referee: Carlos Manuel Martínez |

| August 8, 2012 3 | Irapuato | 0–1 | Toluca | Irapuato, Guanajuato |
| 19:00 | Guillén (yellow card) 62'; Balcázar (yellow card) 80'; Brown (yellow card) 83' | Report | Benítez 44' | Stadium: Estadio Sergio León Chavez; Attendance: 6,800; Referee: Erick Miranda |

| August 22, 2012 4 | Toluca | 4–1 | Irapuato | Toluca, Estado de Mexico |
| 19:00 | Paganoni (yellow card) 32'; Brambila 42'; Benítez 44', 78', 82' | Report | Cerda (yellow card) 17'; Balcázar (yellow card) 36'; Dos Santos (yellow card) 42'; J. Valdéz 53'; Jiménez (yellow card) 54'; Guillén (yellow card) 81' | Stadium: Estadio Nemesio Díez; Attendance: 5,101; Referee: Antony Zanjuampa |

| August 30, 2012 5 | Puebla | 1–0 | Toluca | Puebla, Puebla |
| 19:00 | Abelairas (yellow card) 7'; Ortiz 36' | Report | Trejo (yellow card) 26'; Galeana (yellow card) 88' | Stadium: Estadio Cuauhtémoc; Attendance: 4,164; Referee: Óscar Macías Romo |

| September 18, 2012 6 | Toluca | 2–0 | Puebla | Toluca, Estado de Mexico |
| 19:00 | Pizano 49' (o.g.); Esquivel 75' | Report | Juárez (yellow card) 35'; Polo (yellow card) 35'; Pizano (yellow card) 88' | Stadium: Estadio Nemesio Díez; Attendance: 4,298; Referee: Fernando Guerrero |

=== Knockout stage ===
| September 26, 2012 Quarter-finals | Necaxa | 1–1 (5–3 p) | Toluca | Aguascalientes, Aguascalientes |
| 19:00 | Hurtado (yellow card) 34'; Isijara (yellow card) 49'; Santoya 80', (yellow card) 80' | Report | Benítez 16'; Acosta (yellow card) 90' | Stadium: Estadio Victoria; Attendance: 8,365; Referee: Carlos Manuel Martínez |
| | Penalties |
| | Santoya (penalty scored); Hernández (penalty scored); H. Cervantes (penalty scored); Mosqueda (penalty scored); M. Pérez (penalty scored) | | (penalty missed) Benítez; (penalty scored) Novaretti; (penalty scored) Brambila; (penalty scored) Velasco |

=== Goalscorers ===
| Position | Nation | Name | Goals scored |
|---|---|---|---|
| 1. | (Paraguay) | Édgar Benítez | 6 |
| 2. | (Mexico) | Héctor Acosta | 1 |
| 2. | (Mexico) | Edy Germán Brambila | 1 |
| 2. | (Mexico) | Carlos Esquivel | 1 |
| 2. | (Mexico) | Sinha | 1 |
| 2. | (Mexico) | Francisco Pizano | 1 |
| TOTAL | | | 11 |

=== Results ===
==== Results by round ====
| Round | 1 | 2 | 3 | 4 | 5 | 6 |
|---|---|---|---|---|---|---|
| Ground | H | A | A | H | A | H |
| Result | L | D | W | W | L | W |
| Position | 4 | 3 | 3 | 1 | 3 | 1 |

Updated to match(es) played on 18 September 2012. Source: Apertura results and mediotiempo.com
A = Away; H = Home; W = Win; D = Draw; L = Loss

== Torneo Clausura ==
=== Squad ===
Note: Flags indicate national team as defined under FIFA eligibility rules; some limited exceptions apply. Players may hold more than one non-FIFA nationality.

| No. | Pos. | Nation | Player |
|---|---|---|---|
| 1 | GK | MEX | Alfredo Talavera |
| 2 | DF | ARG | Diego Novaretti |
| 3 | DF | MEX | Fausto Pinto |
| 4 | DF | MEX | Francisco Gamboa |
| 5 | MF | BRA | Wilson Mathías |
| 6 | MF | MEX | Carlos Gerardo Rodríguez |
| 7 | DF | MEX | Marvin Cabrera |
| 8 | MF | BRA | Lucas Silva |
| 9 | FW | MEX | Juan Carlos Cacho |
| 10 | MF | MEX | Sinha (Captain) |
| 11 | FW | MEX | Carlos Esquivel |
| 12 | GK | MEX | Miguel Ángel Centeno |
| 13 | DF | MEX | Héctor Acosta |
| 14 | DF | MEX | Édgar Dueñas |

| No. | Pos. | Nation | Player |
|---|---|---|---|
| 15 | MF | MEX | Antonio Ríos |
| 16 | DF | MEX | Carlos Alberto Galeana |
| 17 | FW | MEX | Arturo Tapia |
| 18 | MF | MEX | Xavier Baez |
| 19 | FW | MEX | Edy Germán Brambila |
| 20 | FW | MEX | Flavio Santos |
| 21 | MF | MEX | Gabriel Velasco |
| 23 | FW | PAR | Édgar Benítez |
| 24 | GK | MEX | Sergio Arturo Pérez |
| 26 | MF | MEX | Erbín Trejo |
| 28 | MF | MEX | Renato Román |
| 29 | FW | PAN | Luis Tejada |
| 30 | GK | MEX | Ernesto Sánchez |

=== Regular season ===
Win Draw Loss

==== Clausura 2013 results ====
| January 6, 2013 Round 1 | Guadalajara | 1–1 | Toluca | Zapopan, Jalisco |
| 17:00 | Sánchez (yellow card) 10'; Fabián (yellow card) 83'; Sabah 85', (red card) 89' | Report | Lucas Silva 83'; Báez (yellow card) 80'; Dueñas (yellow card) 86' | Stadium: Estadio Omnilife; Attendance: 28,545; Referee: Fabricio Morales |

| January 13, 2013 Round 2 | Toluca | 1–1 | Puebla | Toluca, Estado de México |
| 12:00 | Benítez (yellow card) 52'; Lucas Silva 88' | Report | Noriega (yellow card) 27'; Borja 62'; Lacerda (yellow card) 67' | Stadium: Estadio Nemesio Díez; Attendance: 9,853; Referee: Miguel Ángel Flores |

| January 18, 2013 Round 3 | León | 1–2 | Toluca | León, Guanajuato |
| 20:36 | Maz (yellow card) 6'; Rojas (yellow card) 26'; Britos 36', (yellow card) 64'; Márquez (yellow card) 64' | Report | Báez (yellow card) 11'; Benítez 16'; Gamboa (yellow card) 59'; Tejada (yellow card) 63'; Lucas Silva 76' | Stadium: Estadio León; Attendance: 24,985; Referee: Luis Enrique Santander |

| January 27, 2013 Round 4 | Toluca | 0–1 | UNAM | Toluca, Estado de México |
| 12:00 | Novaretti (yellow card) 69'; Dueñas (red card) 86' | Report | Cortés 45'; Chiapas (yellow card) 75'; M. Palacios (yellow card) 89' | Stadium: Estadio Nemesio Díez; Attendance: 12,282; Referee: Marco Antonio Rodríguez |

| February 2, 2013 Round 5 | Pachuca | 1–0 | Toluca | Pachuca, Hidalgo |
| 19:00 | Carreño 20' | Report | Pinto (yellow card) 53'; Gamboa (yellow card) 74' | Stadium: Estadio Hidalgo; Attendance: 27,798; Referee: Paul Delgadillo |

| February 10, 2013 Round 6 | Toluca | 1–4 | UANL | Toluca, Estado de México |
| 12:00 | Dueñas 78' | Report | Juninho 33'; Lobos 50' (pen.); Luis García 90+1'; Villa 90+5' | Stadium: Estadio Nemesio Díez; Referee: Fernando Guerrero |

| February 16, 2013 Round 7 | América | 2–2 | Toluca | Coyoacán, Mexico City |
| 17:00 | Jiménez 34'; Aguilar (yellow card) 51'; Martínez 82' (pen.) | Report | Novaretti 18'; Rodríguez (yellow card) 60', (goal) 90+5'; Acosta (yellow card) 81' | Stadium: Estadio Azteca; Attendance: 44,521; Referee: Francisco Chacón |

| February 24, 2013 Round 8 | Toluca | 2–1 | Chiapas | Toluca, Estado de México |
| 12:00 | Lucas Silva (yellow card) 34', (goal) 47'; Sinha (yellow card) 67'; Santos 77' | Report | Rey 19'; Gastélum (yellow card) 58'; Andrade (yellow card) 88' | Stadium: Estadio Nemesio Díez; Attendance: 8,863; Referee: César Arturo Ramos |

| March 3, 2013 Round 9 | Atlante | 0–1 | Toluca | Cancún, Quintana Roo |
| 18:00 | Bizera (yellow card) 65' | Report | Tejada 34'; Dueñas (yellow card) 89' | Stadium: Estadio Andrés Quintana Roo; Attendance: 7,010; Referee: Jorge Antonio Pérez |

| March 10, 2013 Round 10 | Toluca | 0–1 | Atlas | Toluca, Estado de México |
| 12:00 | Lucas Silva (yellow card) 34'; Gamboa (yellow card) 47'; Novaretti (yellow card) 60' | Report | Ayala (yellow card) 9'; Millar 81', (yellow card) 81' | Stadium: Estadio Nemesio Díez; Attendance: 12,678; Referee: Roberto García Orozco |

| March 16, 2013 Round 11 | Querétaro | 1–0 | Toluca | Querétaro, Querétaro |
| 17:00 | Gabas (yellow card) 22'; Novaretti 31' (o.g.); Escoto (yellow card) 35'; Cosme (yellow card) 37'; Jiménez (yellow card) 55' de la Torre (yellow card) 61' | Report | Tejada (yellow card) 39'; Santos (yellow card) 49'; Rodríguez (yellow card) 49'; Wilson Mathías (yellow card) 77' | Stadium: Estadio Corregidora; Attendance: 16,739; Referee: Miguel Ángel Flores |

| March 30, 2013 Round 12 | Toluca | 1–0 | Tijuana | Toluca, Estado de México |
| 17:00 | Wilson Mathías 7'; Talavera (yellow card) 11'; Acosta (yellow card) 30'; Sinha (yellow card) 87' | Report | Martínez (red card) 9'; Pellerano (yellow card) 10'; Riascos (yellow card) 34'; Márquez (yellow card) 72' | Stadium: Estadio Nemesio Díez; Attendance: 10,896; Referee: Jorge Isaac Rojas |

| April 7, 2013 Round 13 | Toluca | 1–0 | Monterrey | Toluca, Estado de México |
| 17:00 | Sinha (yellow card) 28'; Cacho 71' | Report | Meza (yellow card) 15'; Solís (yellow card) 90+2' | Stadium: Estadio Nemesio Díez; Referee: Miguel Ángel Chacón |

| April 12, 2013 Round 14 | Santos Laguna | 2–1 | Toluca | Torreón, Coahuila |
| 19:30 | Calderón (yellow card) 62'; Ibáñez 65'; Peralta 69' | Report | Lucas Silva 28'; Wilson Mathías (yellow card) 90' | Stadium: Estadio Corona; Referee: Erim Ramírez |

| April 21, 2013 Round 15 | Toluca | 0–2 | Cruz Azul | Toluca, Estado de México |
| 12:00 | Lucas Silva (yellow card) 24'; Sinha (yellow card) 49'; Benítez (yellow card) 69' | Report | Giménez 19'; Perea 29'; T. Gutiérrez (yellow card) 49'; Torrado (yellow card) 74' | Stadium: Estadio Nemesio Díez; Referee: Fernando Guerrero |

| April 26, 2013 Round 16 | Morelia | 2–1 | Toluca | Morelia, Michoacán |
| 19:30 | Montero 36'; Mancilla 67'; Ramírez (yellow card) 89'; Ruiz (yellow card) 90+1' | Report | Ríos (yellow card) 31'; Rodríguez 58'; Sinha (yellow card) 90' | Stadium: Estadio Morelos; Attendance: 15,759; Referee: César Arturo Ramos |

| May 5, 2013 Round 17 | Toluca | 0–1 | San Luis | Toluca, Estado de México |
| 12:00 | Wilson Mathías (yellow card) 44' | Report | Mendoza 36' | Stadium: Estadio Nemesio Díez; Attendance: 8,889; Referee: Fabricio Morales |

Toluca did not qualify to the Final Phase

=== Goalscorers ===
| Position | Nation | Name | Goals scored |
|---|---|---|---|
| 1. | (Brazil) | Lucas Silva | 5 |
| 2. | (Mexico) | Carlos Gerardo Rodríguez | 2 |
| 3. | (Paraguay) | Édgar Benítez | 1 |
| 3. | (Mexico) | Juan Carlos Cacho | 1 |
| 3. | (Mexico) | Édgar Dueñas | 1 |
| 3. | (Brazil) | Wilson Mathías | 1 |
| 3. | (Argentina) | Diego Novaretti | 1 |
| 3. | (Mexico) | Flavio Santos | 1 |
| 3. | (Panama) | Luis Tejada | 1 |
| TOTAL | | | 14 |

=== Results ===
==== Results summary ====
| Overall | | | | | | | | Home | | | | | | Away | | | | | |
| Pld | W | D | L | GF | GA | GD | Pts | W | D | L | GF | GA | GD | W | D | L | GF | GA | GD |
|---|---|---|---|---|---|---|---|---|---|---|---|---|---|---|---|---|---|---|---|
| 17 | 5 | 3 | 9 | 14 | 21 | −7 | 18 | 3 | 1 | 5 | 5 | 7 | −2 | 2 | 2 | 4 | 9 | 14 | −5 |

Last updated: 5 May 2013.
Source: Clausura 2013 results

==== Results by round ====
| Round | 1 | 2 | 3 | 4 | 5 | 6 | 7 | 8 | 9 | 10 | 11 | 12 | 13 | 14 | 15 | 16 | 17 |
|---|---|---|---|---|---|---|---|---|---|---|---|---|---|---|---|---|---|
| Ground | A | H | A | H | A | H | A | H | A | H | A | H | H | A | H | A | H |
| Result | D | D | W | L | L | L | D | W | W | L | L | W | W | L | L | L | L |
| Position | 13 | 10 | 6 | 9 | 12 | 15 | 15 | 13 | 11 | 13 | 14 | 12 | 10 | 10 | 12 | 12 | 13 |

Updated to match(es) played on 5 May 2013. Source: Clausuea 2013 results and mediotiempo.com
A = Away; H = Home; W = Win; D = Draw; L = Loss

== Copa Libertadores ==
=== Group 1 ===
| Pos | Team | Pld | W | D | L | GF | GA | GD | Pts | NAC | BOC | TOL | BAR |
|---|---|---|---|---|---|---|---|---|---|---|---|---|---|
| 1 | (Uruguay) Nacional (A) | 6 | 3 | 1 | 2 | 10 | 6 | +4 | 10 | | 0–1 | 4–0 | 2–2 |
| 2 | (Argentina) Boca Juniors (A) | 6 | 3 | 0 | 3 | 7 | 7 | 0 | 9 | 0–1 | | 1–2 | 1–0 |
| 3 | (Mexico) Toluca | 6 | 2 | 2 | 2 | 8 | 11 | −3 | 8 | 2–3 | 3–2 | | 1–1 |
| 4 | (Ecuador) Barcelona | 6 | 1 | 3 | 2 | 5 | 6 | −1 | 6 | 1–0 | 1–2 | 0–0 | |

Source: RSSSF
(A) Advanced to the round of 16

=== Second stage ===
Win Draw Loss

==== Copa Libertadores results ====
| February 13, 2013 1 | Boca Juniors (Argentina) | 1–2 | (Mexico) Toluca | Buenos Aires, Argentina |
| 21:00 UTC−03:00 | Silva 23' (pen.) | Report | Wilson Mathías (yellow card) 36'; Esquivel 58'; Sinha (yellow card) 71'; Benítez 73'; Rodríguez (yellow card) 81' | Stadium: Estadio Alberto J. Armando; Referee: Víctor Hugo Carrillo (Peru) |

| February 19, 2013 2 | Toluca (Mexico) | 2–3 | (Uruguay) Nacional | Toluca, Mexico |
| 20:45 UTC−6 | Tejada 22', (yellow card) 43'; Benítez 52'; Sinha (yellow card) 90'; Santos (yellow card) 90+1' | Report | Núñez (yellow card) 18'; Damonte (yellow card) 35'; Sánchez 47', 55'; Bava (yellow card) 50'; Alonso 57', (yellow card) 90+3'; Díaz (red card) 87' (manager); Cortés (yellow card) 90' | Stadium: Estadio Nemesio Díez; Referee: Wilmar Roldán (Colombia) |

| March 6, 2013 3 | Toluca (Mexico) | 1–1 | (Ecuador) Barcelona | Toluca, Mexico |
| 21:15 UTC−6 | Tejada 83' | Report | Oyola (yellow card) 22'; Díaz 36'; Arroyo (yellow card) 54' | Stadium: Estadio Nemesio Díez; Referee: Héber Lopes (Brazil) |

| March 13, 2013 4 | Barcelona (Ecuador) | 0–0 | (Mexico) Toluca | Guayaquil, Ecuador |
| 17:45 UTC−05:00 | Grueso (yellow card) 88' | Report | Rodríguez (yellow card) 74'; Dueñas (yellow card) 83' | Stadium: Estadio Monumental Isidro Romero Carbo; Referee: Enrique Cáceres (Paraguay) |

| April 4, 2013 5 | Nacional (Uruguay) | 4–0 | (Mexico) Toluca | Montevideo, Uruguay |
| 19:15 UTC−03:00 | Bueno 11', 89'; Damonte 35'; Damonte (yellow card) 64'; Alonso 74' (pen.) | Report | Tejada (yellow card) 64'; Dueñas (yellow card) 72' | Stadium: Estadio Gran Parque Central; Referee: Héber Lopes (Brazil) |

| April 17, 2013 6 | Toluca (Mexico) | 3–2 | (Argentina) Boca Juniors | Toluca, Mexico |
| 17:45 UTC−05:00 | Benítez 10'; Rodríguez (yellow card) 45+1'; Flavio Santos 65', 82'; Cabrera (yellow card) 76' | Report | Somoza 45+2', (yellow card) 85'; Martínez (yellow card) 54'; Fernández 77' | Stadium: Estadio Nemesio Díez; Referee: Imer Machado (Colombia) |

=== Goalscorers ===
| Position | Nation | Name | Goals scored |
|---|---|---|---|
| 1. | (Paraguay) | Édgar Benítez | 3 |
| 2. | (Mexico) | Flavio Santos | 2 |
| 2. | (Panama) | Luis Tejada | 2 |
| 4. | (Mexico) | Carlos Esquivel | 1 |
| TOTAL | | | 8 |

=== Results ===
==== Results summary ====
| Overall | | | | | | | | Home | | | | | | Away | | | | | |
| Pld | W | D | L | GF | GA | GD | Pts | W | D | L | GF | GA | GD | W | D | L | GF | GA | GD |
|---|---|---|---|---|---|---|---|---|---|---|---|---|---|---|---|---|---|---|---|
| 6 | 2 | 2 | 2 | 8 | 11 | −3 | 8 | 1 | 1 | 1 | 6 | 6 | 0 | 1 | 1 | 1 | 2 | 5 | −3 |

Last updated: 2 May 2013.
Source: Copa Libertadores results

==== Results by round ====
| Round | 1 | 2 | 3 | 4 | 5 | 6 |
|---|---|---|---|---|---|---|
| Ground | A | H | H | A | H | A |
| Result | W | L | D | D | L | W |
| Position | 1 | 2 | 2 | 3 | 3 | 3 |

Updated to match(es) played on 2 May 2013. Source: Copa Libertadores results
A = Away; H = Home; W = Win; D = Draw; L = Loss
