= Arturo Muñoz =

Arturo Muñoz may refer to:

- Arturo Muñoz (footballer)
- Arturo Muñoz (intelligence)
- Arturo Muñoz (wrestler)
