= Van Rankin =

van Rankin is a surname. Notable people with the surname include:

- Allan van Rankin (born 1987), Mexican footballer of Dutch descent, nephew of Jorge
- Jorge van Rankin (born 1963), Mexican radio and television personality
- Josecarlos Van Rankin (born 1993), Mexican footballer
