= Juan Cuevas =

Argentine-Mexican footballer

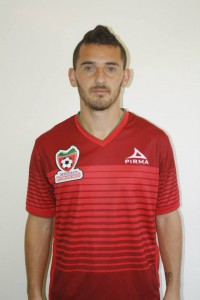
- Cuevas with Mineros de Zacatecas

Personal information
- Full name: Juan Ezequiel Cuevas
- Date of birth: 4 June 1988 (age 38)
- Place of birth: Coronel Pringles (Bs. As.), Argentina
- Height: 1.61 m (5 ft 3 1/2 in)
- Position: Forward

Team information
- Current team: Chacarita Juniors

Youth career
- Gimnasia LP

Senior career*
Years	Team	Apps	(Gls)
2006–2010	Gimnasia LP	94	(10)
2010–2011	Toluca	15	(0)
2011–2013	San Luis	26	(3)
2011–2012	→ Atlante (loan)	30	(5)
2012	→ Gimnasia LP (loan)	13	(0)
2013–2014	Estudiantes Tecos	32	(9)
2014–2015	Zacatecas	48	(25)
2016	León	31	(0)
2017	Zacatecas	19	(3)
2017–2023	Everton	141	(36)
2024–2026	San Martín Tucumán	72	(9)
2026–	Chacarita Juniors	6	(0)
- * Club domestic league appearances and goals as of 18:13, 1 April 2026 (UTC)

Juan Ezequiel Cuevas (born 4 June 1988) is an Argentine-Mexican footballer who plays as a forward for Chacarita Juniors.

== Career ==
Starting his career in 2006, playing for Gimnasia y Esgrima LP. He started to play regularly in 2009, under coach Leonardo Madelón. In July 2010, Cuevas was sold to Club Toluca for US$900,000, soon after Toluca's championship in the Bicentenario 2010 tournament. After the season was over, on 22 December 2010, head coach Sergio Lugo announced that Cuevas was to be sent on loan to San Luis F.C. for the Clausura 2011 tournament not for personal reasons, but states his reason that his position is the same as Zinha (playmaker). In mid-2011, he was moved again, this time to Atlante F.C., where he scored 6 goals in 30 games.

After a stay in the Mexican league, in July 2012, Cuevas returned to his original club, Gimnasia y Esgrima, on a one-year loan.

=== Club León ===
On 2 December 2015, Club León announced via Twitter that Cuevas would be joining the team for the Clausura 2016.

=== Everton ===
He joined Everton de Viña del Mar in the Chilean Primera División in 2017, ending his contract in December 2023.
