= Sebastián Nayar =

Argentine footballer

Personal information
- Full name: Sebastián Ricardo Nayar
- Date of birth: 10 May 1988 (age 38)
- Place of birth: Buenos Aires, Argentina
- Position: Midfielder

Team information
- Current team: Victoria Hotspurs

Youth career
- –2007: Boca Juniors

Senior career*
Years	Team	Apps	(Gls)
2007–2008	Boca Juniors	1	(0)
2008–2009	Recreativo Huelva	14	(0)
2010	Deportivo Cali	1	(0)
2010–2012	Atlante	0	(0)
2011	→ Aldosivi (loan)	11	(0)
2012–2013	Orihuela	7	(0)
2013–2014	San Roque	12	(1)
2014–2015	Kerkyra	37	(4)
2015–2016	AEL	16	(1)
2016	Panegialios	1	(0)
2017	Floriana	11	(1)
2017	Lincoln Red Imps	2	(0)
2018	Floriana	22	(2)
2018–2019	Hamrun Spartans	17	(1)
2020–	Victoria Hotspurs		
- * Club domestic league appearances and goals as of 23:35, 7 December 2019 (UTC)

Sebastián Ricardo Nayar (born 10 May 1988) is an Argentinian professional footballer who plays as a midfielder for Victoria Hotspurs.

== Career ==
Born in Buenos Aires, Nayar began his career with local team Boca Juniors, making one appearance in the 2008 Clausura. Nayar then moved to Spanish team Recreativo Huelva at the end of the season, despite still being contracted to Boca. During his debut season with Recreativo, Nayar made 14 appearances in the league. Nayar later signed for Colombian team Deportivo Cali, moving on to Mexican team Atlante, before returning to Argentina in January 2011 with Aldosivi. In September 2012, he joined Orihuela. In January 2013, he left Orihuela and joined San Roque de Lepe. He joined Greek club Kerkyra for the 2013–14 season. On August 11, 2015, he signed with Greek Football League club AEL. On 17 February 2016 Nayar was released from his contract, due to a disciplinary offense. Five days later, On 22 February 2016, there was an official announcement from the club's major shareholder Alexis Kougias, stating that the player will finally remain in the team's squad. On 14 July 2016, Nayar left the club by mutual agreement. In September 2016, Nayar signed for Panegialios.

On 16 January 2020, Nayar signed with Victoria Hotspurs.
