= Arturo Muñoz (intelligence) =

American political scientist

Arturo G. Muñoz is a political scientist at RAND Corporation. Before that, he had worked in the CIA before retiring in 2009. Muñoz has also spent his post-CIA career participating in various endeavors, such as assisting the CIA with Releases of Unclassified Edition of Studies in Intelligence and teaching at Georgetown University's Center for Security Studies (CSS). Muñoz's analysis and commentaries have been aired on international media, cable stations, and national television; streamed all over the internet; and cited by newspapers and magazines.

== Publications ==
- Amazigh: The Berbers of Morocco
- Afghanistan's Local War: Building Local Defense Forces
- Jenkins, Brian Michael; Godges, John (2011). The Long Shadow of 9/11. Rand Corporation. ISBN 9780833058386.
- Bent by History in Afghanistan
- Santa Muerte Syncretism
- A Long-Overdue Adaptation to the Afghan Environment
- Response to Why RAND Missed the Point
- Civil defense forces in Afghanistan
- USMIL information operations in Afghanistan
- Taliban strategy and tactics
- Taliban propaganda and psychological operations
- Taliban shadow government
- Assessing Military Information Operations in Afghanistan
- Information Operations: The Imperative of Doctrine Harmonization and Measures of Effectiveness
- Chinese Industrial Espionage: Technology Acquisition and Military Modernization (CIA study)
