= Luis Eduardo Rodríguez =

Mexican footballer (born 1991)

Luis Eduardo Rodríguez Chávez (born September 14, 1991, in Saltillo, Coahuila) is a Mexican professional footballer who plays for Yalmakán on loan from Atlante.
