= Erbín Trejo =

Mexican footballer (born 1990)

Personal information
- Full name: Erbín Alejandro Trejo Macias
- Date of birth: June 3, 1990 (age 36)
- Place of birth: Mexico City, Mexico
- Height: 1.71 m (5 ft 7 1/2 in)
- Position: Midfielder

Senior career*
Years	Team	Apps	(Gls)
2007–2009	Atlético Mexiquense	27	(15)
2009–2017	Toluca	66	(6)
2017–2019	Querétaro	38	(3)
2019–2020	Zacatepec	15	(0)
- * Club domestic league appearances and goals as of 06:01, 8 October 2018 (UTC)

Erbín Alejandro Trejo Macias (born June 3, 1990) is a former Mexican professional footballer who last played as a midfielder.

== Career ==
Trejo began playing football with Toluca's Primera "A" affiliate Atlético Mexiquense. After the club withdrew from the Primera "A" in 2009, Toluca manager José Manuel de la Torre selected Trejo for training with the parent club. He made his Primera División debut July 26, 2009 against CD Guadalajara, a game Toluca won 4–3.

== Honours ==
=== Club ===
Querétaro

- Supercopa MX: 2017
