= Allan van Rankin =

Mexican footballer (born 1987)

Personal information
- Full name: Allan van Rankin Galland
- Date of birth: 4 October 1987 (age 39)
- Place of birth: Mexico City, Mexico
- Height: 1.80 m (5 ft 11 in)
- Position: Goalkeeper

Senior career*
Years	Team	Apps	(Gls)
2007–2008	Tecamachalco	14	(0)
2008–2011	Atlante	0	(0)
- * Club domestic league appearances and goals

Allan van Rankin Galland (born 4 October 1987) is a Mexican former professional footballer who played as a goalkeeper.

Van Rankin played with 3rd division team Tecamachalco, where he was also their captain. He signed with Atlante prior to the Apertura 2008 tournament. Van Rankin is currently playing 4th string goalie behind Antonio Pérez, Moisés Muñoz, and Eder Patiño.

Allan has a twin brother, Elliot, who is a racing driver in the NASCAR Corona Series. He also has another brother, Josecarlos, who plays with CD Guadalajara.

His uncle, Jorge, better known as "El Burro" (The Donkey), is one of the most famous radio and television hosts in Mexico.
