= Alberto García (footballer, born 1993) =

Mexican footballer

Personal information
- Full name: Alberto Jorge García Carpizo
- Date of birth: 26 September 1993 (age 33)
- Place of birth: Guadalajara, Jalisco, Mexico
- Height: 1.71 m (5 ft 7 in)
- Position: Forward

Youth career
- 2008–2009: Santa Rosa
- 2009–2010: Querétaro

Senior career*
Years	Team	Apps	(Gls)
2010–2013	Querétaro	7	(1)
2013	→ Atlante (loan)	8	(0)
2013–2016	Atlante	22	(6)
2014–2015	→ Guadalajara (loan)	2	(0)
2015	→ América (loan)	1	(0)
2016	→ UdeG (loan)	7	(2)
2016	Belén	16	(0)
2017–2019	Tampico Madero	44	(7)
2021	Irapuato	23	(12)
2021	Guastatoya	7	(2)
2022	UAT	7	(1)
2023	Querétaro	8	(0)
- * Club domestic league appearances and goals as of 11 November 2023

Alberto Jorge García Carpizo (Note: In this Spanish name, the first or paternal surname is García and the second or maternal family name is Carpizo.) (born 26 September 1993) is a Mexican professional footballer who plays as a forward.

== Club career ==
=== Early years ===
García was born in Guadalajara, where his father, Alberto "Guamerú" García, was playing at the time with C.D. Guadalajara. He is known as "Guamerucito" or "Guamerú Jr." in honor of his father. He started his career at the age of fifteen years in the fourth division team Santa Rosa F.C. and then moved to first division club Querétaro.

=== Querétaro ===
Under Argentine coach Ángel Comizzo, he then made his official Primera División debut at the age of eighteen on April 14, 2012, in a 2 to 2 draw away against San Luis, in which he also scored his first goal. Despite the successful start in Querétaro, he was only a used in the reserve squad most of the time.

=== Atlante ===
In the spring of 2013, García was loaned to Atlante F.C. for six months with an option for purchase. In the spring of the Clausura 2013 season the team reached the final of the cup - Copa MX. The club purchased him after his loan expired but at the end of the 2013/2014 season Atlante became relegated to the second division. Despite being relegated, he managed to have a good season. In one of Atlante's final matches of the first division, García scored a hat-trick.

==== Loan at Guadalajara ====
In June 2014, C.D. Guadalajara announced they had signed García on a one-year loan deal with an option of purchase. He was assigned the number 23 shirt, the same number his father wore during his time at the club.

==== Loan at América ====
In June 2015, Guadalajara rivals Club América shockingly announced they had signed García on a six-month loan deal with an option of purchase from Atlante after his loan expired with Guadalajara. An injury during pre-season led him to surgery, ruling him out of action for the rest of his loan.

==== Loan at U. de G. ====
In December 2015, Club Universidad de Guadalajara announced they had signed García on loan.

== Personal life ==
Alberto's younger brother, Brian, is also a professional footballer who plays as a defender.
