= Román Fuente =

Mexican footballer (born 1985)

Personal information
- Full name: Román Adrián Fuente González
- Date of birth: 5 September 1921
- Place of birth: Izamal, Mexico
- Position: Goalkeeper

Senior career*
Years	Team	Apps	(Gls)
2010–2011	Atlante	0	(0)
2010–2011	Atlante II	10	(0)
2011	Venados	0	(0)
2015	Venados	1	(0)
Total		11	(0)
- * Club domestic league appearances and goals

Román Adrián Fuente González (Note: In this Spanish name, the first or paternal surname is Fuente and the second or maternal family name is González.) (born 31 January 1985) is a former professional Mexican footballer who last played for Venados on loan from Atlante.
