= Carlos Galeana =

Mexican footballer

Personal information
- Full name: Carlos Alberto Galeana Irra
- Date of birth: 21 December 1989 (age 36)
- Place of birth: Lázaro Cárdenas, Michoacán, Mexico
- Height: 1.80 m (5 ft 11 in)
- Position: Defender

Senior career*
Years	Team	Apps	(Gls)
2005–2008	Atlético Mexiquense	33	(1)
2008–2014	Toluca	22	(0)
2013–2014	→ Lobos BUAP (loan)	1	(0)
2015–2019	Celaya	70	(0)
2019	Venados	15	(0)
- * Club domestic league appearances and goals

Carlos Alberto Galeana Irra (Note: In this Spanish name, the first or paternal surname is Galeana and the second or maternal family name is Irra.) (born 21 December 1988) is a Mexican former professional footballer who played as a defender.

== Club career ==
He made his debut 1 August 2009 against Chiapas. A game which resulted in a 2–0 victory for Toluca. He has also played for Toluca in the 2009–10 CONCACAF Champions League.
