= Wilson Tiago =

Brazilian footballer (born 1983)

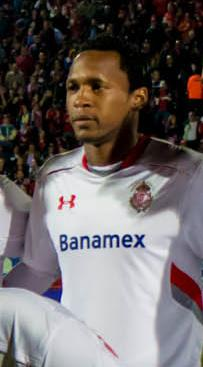

Personal information
- Full name: Wilson Tiago Matías
- Date of birth: September 14, 1983 (age 43)
- Place of birth: Limeira, Brazil
- Height: 1.85 m (6 ft 1 in)
- Position: Defensive midfielder

Youth career
- 2001–2002: Velo Clube

Senior career*
Years	Team	Apps	(Gls)
2003	União São João	65	(2)
2003–2005	Ituano	7	(1)
2005–2009	Morelia	156	(9)
2010–2012	Internacional	29	(1)
2012	→ Portuguesa (loan)	1	(0)
2012–2014	Toluca	73	(8)
2014–2016	Veracruz	17	(0)
2015	→ Chiapas (loan)	9	(0)
2015	→ Querétaro (loan)	9	(0)
2016	→ Sinaloa (loan)	7	(0)
2017–2018	Oeste	16	(0)
- * Club domestic league appearances and goals

Wilson Tiago Matías (born September 14, 1983) is a Brazilian former professional footballer who played as a defensive midfielder. He is a Mexican naturalized citizen.

== Career ==
Before coming to Monarcas Morelia he played for Ituano Futebol Clube. He made his debut with Monarcas Morelia against Cruz Azul, which ended in a 2–1 victory for Cruz Azul. After a difficult debut with a red card, he started to earn his spot in the squad. Wilson Matías had the second most appearances of any club member at the time, just behind goalkeeper Moisés Muñoz. After five years in Mexico for Monarcas Morelia he signed on December 30, 2009 a contract with Internacional. He is a naturalized citizen of Mexico.

== Honours ==
=== Club ===
Internacional

- Copa Libertadores: 2010
- Campeonato Gaúcho: 2011
- Recopa Sudamericana: 2011
