= Nicolás Torres (footballer, born 1983) =

Argentine footballer

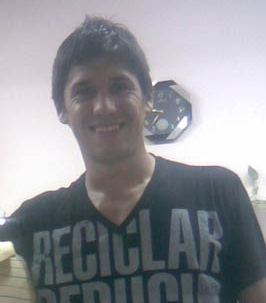
- Nicolás Torres in 2020.

Personal information
- Full name: Nicolás Emanuel Torres
- Date of birth: 10 October 1983 (age 43)
- Place of birth: Concepción del Uruguay, Argentina
- Height: 1.83 m (6 ft 0 in)
- Position: Midfielder

Team information
- Current team: Atlante
- Number: 5

Senior career*
Years	Team	Apps	(Gls)
2002–2004	Gimnasia y Esgrima	5	(0)
2004–2008	Tigre	100	(3)
2008–2010	Colón	48	(2)
2010–	Atlante	2	(0)
- * Club domestic league appearances and goals as of 11 April 2010 (UTC)

Nicolás Emanuel Torres (born 10 October 1983 in Concepción del Uruguay, Entre Ríos) is an Argentine footballer who plays for Mexican club Atlante in the Primera División de Mexico.

Torres started his career with local team Club Gimnasia y Esgrima (Concepción del Uruguay). In 2004, he joined Club Atlético Tigre and helped the team win promotion from the 3rd division to the Argentine Primera.

In 2008 Torres joined Colón de Santa Fe of the Argentine Primera.

== Titles ==
Season	Team	Title
Apertura 2004	Club Atlético Tigre	Primera B Metropolitana
Clausura 2005	Club Atlético Tigre	Primera B Metropolitana

== Career statistics ==
Season	Club	Division	Apps	Goals
2002/2003	Gimnasia (CdU)	2nd division	3	0
2003/2004	Gimnasia (CdU)	2nd division	2	0
2004/2005	Tigre	3rd division	27	1
2005/2006	Tigre	2nd division	30	1
2006/2007	Tigre	2nd division	31	1
2007/2008	Tigre	Primera	18	0
2008/2009	Colón de Santa Fe	Primera	2	0
