= Alfonso Luna =

Mexican footballer (born 1990)

Personal information
- Full name: Alfonso Luna Islas
- Date of birth: 23 January 1990 (age 36)
- Place of birth: Metepec, Hidalgo, Mexico
- Height: 1.75 m (5 ft 9 in)
- Position: Defender

Youth career
- 2007–2011: UNAM
- 2011–2013: Atlante

Senior career*
Years	Team	Apps	(Gls)
2011–2020	Atlante	116	(1)
2013–2014	→ Atlético Coatzacoalcos (loan)	34	(2)
2020	Querétaro	13	(0)
2021–2023	Venados	46	(2)
2024	Oaxaca	27	(1)
- * Club domestic league appearances and goals as of 15:38, 27 October 2024 (UTC)

Alfonso Luna Islas (born 23 January 1990) is a Mexican professional footballer who plays as a defender.
