= Jorge Hernández (footballer, born 1988) =

Mexican footballer

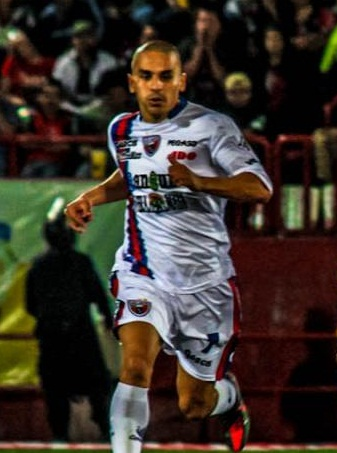
- Hernández playing for Atlante

Personal information
- Full name: Jorge Hernández González
- Date of birth: 22 February 1988 (age 38)
- Place of birth: Guadalajara, Jalisco, Mexico
- Height: 1.75 m (5 ft 9 in)
- Position: Midfielder

Team information
- Current team: Mexico U23 (Assistant)

Youth career
- Atlas

Senior career*
Years	Team	Apps	(Gls)
2006–2007	Barcelona		
2007–2010	Atlas	37	(0)
2009–2010	→ Morelia (loan)	26	(0)
2010	Veracruz	23	(0)
2011–2014	Atlante	47	(0)
2012–2013	→ Tijuana (loan)	14	(0)
2014	Santos de Guápiles	14	(0)
2015–2017	UdeG	54	(0)

International career
2005	Mexico U17	9	(0)
2007	Mexico U20	7	(0)
2008	Mexico U23	3	(0)
2007–2008	Mexico	3	(0)

Managerial career
- 2018–2019: Atlas Reserves and Academy
- 2019–2020: Atlas (Liga TDP)
- 2020: Halcones de Zapopan
- 2021–2022: Zap
- 2022–2025: Tecos
- 2025: Mexico U20 (Assistant)
- 2025–2026: Mexico U21 (Assistant)
- 2026–: Mexico U23 (Assistant)
Medal record
Representing Mexico
Men's football
FIFA U-17 World Cup
Winner	2005 Peru
- * Club domestic league appearances and goals

Jorge Hernández González (born 22 February 1988) is a Mexican former professional footballer who played as a midfielder.

== Career ==
Born in Guadalajara, Jalisco, Hernández was signed along with fellow Mexican U-17 national Efraín Juárez by Barcelona in 2006 after impressing the Spanish giants during the 2005 FIFA U-17 World Championship. However, due to Spanish registration rules limiting the number of non-EU players in club squads, neither of the pair were able to be registered for the Barcelona B-team, forcing Barcelona to loan them out to Tercera División team Barbate. Hernández soon grew unhappy with Spanish fourth-tier football and returned to Atlas after the 2007 CONCACAF U20 Tournament in Mexico (where Mexico qualified for the 2007 FIFA U-20 World Cup).

== International career ==
He played for the under-20 team, which qualified for the 2007 FIFA U-20 World Cup in Canada.

=== International appearances ===
As of 16 April 2008

International appearances
#	Date	Venue	Opponent	Result	Competition
1.	22 August 2007	Dick's Sporting Goods Park, Commerce City, United States	Colombia	0–1	Friendly
2.	17 October 2007	Los Angeles Memorial Coliseum, Los Angeles, United States	Guatemala	2–3	Friendly
3.	16 April 2008	Qwest Field, Seattle, United States	China	1–0	Friendly

== Honours ==
Tijuana

- Liga MX: Apertura 2012

Mexico U17

- FIFA U-17 World Championship: 2005
