= Óscar Vera =

Mexican footballer (born 1986)

Oscar Vera
Personal information
- Full name: Oscar Salvador Vera Anguiano
- Date of birth: 10 March 1986 (age 40)
- Place of birth: León, Guanajuato, Mexico
- Height: 1.71 m (5 ft 7 in)
- Position: Midfielder

Youth career
- 2005–2007: Alacranes de Durango
- 2007–2009: Club Atlas
- 2010: Cruz Azul
- 2011–2013: Atlante F.C.

Senior career*
Years	Team	Apps	(Gls)
2007–2009	Club Atlas	17	(0)
2010–2011	Leones Negros	21	(0)
2011	→Venados F.C.(loan)	7	(1)
2011–2013	Atlante F.C.	33	(0)
2014	Leones Negros	20	(1)
2014–2017	Veracruz	26	(0)
- * Club domestic league appearances and goals as of September 28, 2017

Oscar Salvador Vera Anguiano (Note: In this Spanish name, the first or paternal surname is Vera and the second or maternal family name is Anguiano.) (born 10 March 1986) is a Mexican former footballer who last played as a midfielder for Veracruz.

== Career ==
=== Youth career ===
Vera started his career in 2005 with Alacranes de Durango briefly. Until he joined Atlas Youth Academy in 2007. Jorge Castañeda was the coach that promoted Vera to the first team.

=== Club Atlas ===
Vera joined Atlas youth academy at a young age. Until finally on September 22, 2007, he made his debut against Chiapas F.C. which ended in a 1–0 loss.

=== Veracruz ===
Vera become the new signing for Veracruz coming from Leones Negro. Carlos Reinoso being the new signing for the Clausura 2015.
