= Carlos Calvo (footballer, born 1992) =

Mexican footballer (born 1992)

Personal information
- Full name: Carlos Andrés Calvo Beristain
- Date of birth: 2 December 1992 (age 33)
- Place of birth: Mérida, Yucatán, Mexico
- Height: 1.95 m (6 ft 5 in)
- Position: Left-back

Senior career*
Years	Team	Apps	(Gls)
2012–2020	Atlante	60	(0)
2015	→ Morelia (loan)	5	(1)
2016	→ Veracruz (loan)	9	(0)
2017–2018	→ Toluca (loan)	14	(0)
2017–2018	→ Toluca Premier (loan)	9	(0)
2020–2021	Inter Playa	19	(8)
- * Club domestic league appearances and goals as of 17:07, 27 July 2020 (UTC)

Carlos Andrés Calvo Beristain (born 2 December 1992) is a former Mexican professional footballer who last played for Inter Playa of the Liga Premier de México.

== Club career ==
Calvo joined Deportivo Toluca for the Clausura 2017 on loan from Atlante. On 11 February 2018, he made his league debut for the Red Devils against Monterrey.

== Personal life ==
Calvo is the nephew of Laura Beristain Navarrete, former municipal president of Solidaridad, Quintana Roo.
