= Lucas Silva (footballer, born 1984) =

Brazilian footballer

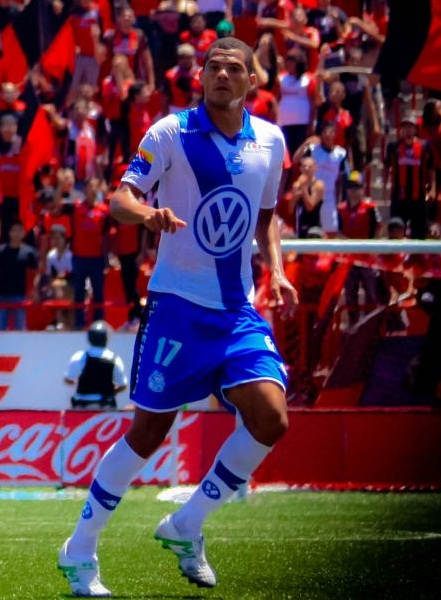
- Silva playing for Puebla in 2011

Personal information
- Full name: Lucas Antônio Silva de Oliveira
- Date of birth: 26 August 1984 (age 42)
- Place of birth: Miguel Calmon-BA, Brazil
- Height: 1.86 m (6 ft 1 in)
- Position: Attacking midfielder

Team information
- Current team: Perilima

Senior career*
Years	Team	Apps	(Gls)
2002–2003	Olaria	1	(0)
2003–2004	Estudiantes Altamira	46	(7)
2005	Delfines de Coatzacoalcos	23	(2)
2005–2006	Correcaminos	40	(14)
2006–2008	Dorados	88	(21)
2008–2010	Villa Rio	0	(0)
2008–2009	→ Botafogo (loan)	16	(0)
2009	→ Atlante UTN (loan)	13	(4)
2010	→ Veracruz (loan)	14	(1)
2010–2012	Dorados	16	(2)
2011	→ Correcaminos UAT	18	(1)
2011–2012	→ Puebla	33	(7)
2012–2013	Toluca	40	(12)
2013–2015	Monterrey	58	(5)
2015–2017	Cruz Azul	12	(3)
2016	→ Pachuca (loan)	9	(0)
2016	→ FC Juárez (loan)	14	(0)
2017	→ Chiapas (loan)	16	(1)
2017	Figueirense	7	(0)
2018–	Perilima	0	(0)
- * Club domestic league appearances and goals as of 21:54, 25 April 2020 (UTC)

Lucas Antônio Silva de Oliveira (born 26 August 1984), commonly known as Lucas Silva, is a Brazilian professional footballer who plays as a midfielder for Perilima. He is a Mexican naturalized citizen.

== Career ==
Lucas signed a five-year contract with Olaria on 1 April 2002. He then signed for Estudiantes de Altamira of Mexico on 13 August 2003. He played for Estudiantes Santander in Clausura 2004 and Apertura 2004. He then played for Correcaminos in the whole Apertura 2005 and Clausura 2006 and season. He played for Dorados de Sinaloa since Apertura 2006.

On 1 June 2008, he returned to Brazil, signing 5-year deal with Villa Rio and immediately loaned to Botafogo in 6-month deal. in January 2009 the loan was extended. In June he returned to Mexico for Atlante, but for its reserve team Atlante UTN at Liga de Ascenso. He also played twice at 2009 FIFA Club World Cup. In 2010, he left for Tiburones Rojos de Veracruz for 2010 Liga de Ascenso Bicentenario. In June 2013, after a short period of time playing for Deportivo Toluca he was signed to play for the CF Monterrey.

On December 11, 2015, Pachuca officially announced that Lucas Silva will be their new signing for the Clausura 2016 following a dreadful season for Cruz Azul who ended in 14th place in the Apertura 2015.

== Honours ==
=== Club ===
Pachuca

- Liga MX: Clausura 2016
