= Óscar Rojas (footballer, born 1988) =

Mexican footballer (born 1988)

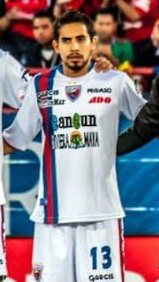

Personal information
- Full name: Óscar Ricardo Rojas García
- Date of birth: 5 February 1988 (age 38)
- Place of birth: Mexico City, Mexico
- Height: 1.70 m (5 ft 7 in)
- Position: Right-back

Team information
- Current team: Inter Playa del Carmen (assistant)

Youth career
- 2000–2011: Pumas Morelos

Senior career*
Years	Team	Apps	(Gls)
2008–2011	Pumas UNAM	31	(1)
2011–2013	→ Atlante (loan)	48	(1)
2013–2014	→ Toluca (loan)	25	(2)
2014–2018	Toluca	57	(2)

Managerial career
- 2020–: Inter Playa del Carmen (assistant)
- * Club domestic league appearances and goals as of 18 September 2016

Óscar Ricardo Rojas (born 5 February 1988) is a Mexican former footballer who last played as a full back for Deportivo Toluca in the Liga MX.
