= Luis Venegas (footballer) =

Mexican footballer (born 1984)

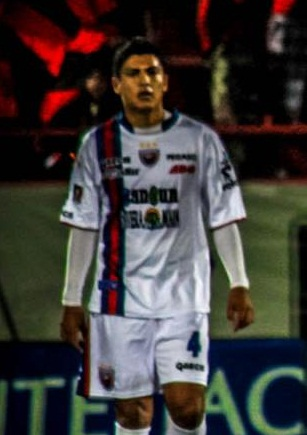

Personal information
- Full name: Luis Gerardo Venegas Zumarán
- Date of birth: 21 June 1984 (age 42)
- Place of birth: San Luis Potosí, Mexico
- Height: 1.85 m (6 ft 1 in)
- Position: Centre back

Senior career*
Years	Team	Apps	(Gls)
2004–2005	San Luis	23	(0)
2005–2006	Águilas Riviera Maya	8	(1)
2006–2007	BUAP	12	(0)
2007–2008	Alacranes	32	(1)
2008	Potros Neza	1	(0)
2008–2014	Atlante	148	(7)
2014–2015	Atlas	30	(0)
2015–2017	Chiapas	38	(4)
2017–2018	Puebla	23	(1)
2018	Alebrijes de Oaxaca	16	(0)
2019	Atlante	12	(1)
2019–2020	Cafetaleros de Chiapas	16	(1)

International career
2014	Mexico	3	(0)
- * Club domestic league appearances and goals as of 20:52, 25 September 2019 (UTC)

Luis Gerardo Venegas Zumarán (born 21 June 1984) is a Mexican footballer who last played for the Ascenso MX club Cafetaleros de Chiapas.

== Career ==
"El Loco" Venegas was noticed by Atlante when he played for Alacranes de Durango in the Primera Division A. José Guadalupe Cruz, Atlante's manager, had him transferred to their former filial team, Club León. However, Venegas was immediately called up to the first team to dispute the North American SuperLiga 2008 in the United States, playing in 3 games.

He has also played in the CONCACAF Champions League for Atlante, playing in 5 games.

He made his international debut for Mexico in September 2014.
