= Arturo Muñoz (footballer) =

Mexican footballer (born 1984)

Personal information
- Full name: Arturo Muñoz Gutiérrez
- Date of birth: 31 December 1984 (age 41)
- Place of birth: Mexico City, Mexico
- Height: 1.72 m (5 ft 8 in)
- Positions: Left-back; winger

Youth career
- Atlante

Senior career*
Years	Team	Apps	(Gls)
2007–2015	Atlante	164	(4)
- * Club domestic league appearances and goals

Arturo Muñoz Gutiérrez (born 31 December 1984) is a Mexican former footballer who played as a left-back.

== Honours ==
Atlante

- Mexican Primera División: Apertura 2007
