= Antonio Pérez (footballer) =

Mexican footballer (born 1978)

Personal information
- Full name: Antonio Pérez Delgadillo
- Date of birth: 16 April 1978 (age 48)
- Place of birth: Guadalajara, Mexico
- Height: 1.83 m (6 ft 0 in)
- Position: Goalkeeper

Team information
- Current team: Jaguares de Jalisco (Goalkeeper coach)

Senior career*
Years	Team	Apps	(Gls)
1998–2007	Atlas	84	(0)
2007–2008	León	?	(?)
2009	Potros Neza	?	(?)
2010	León	20	(0)
2010–2012	Atlante	3	(0)
2013	Querétaro		
2013–2014	Chiapas	0	(0)

Managerial career
- 2020–: Jaguares de Jalisco (Goalkeeper coach)
- * Club domestic league appearances and goals as of 30 March 2013

Antonio Pérez Delgadillo (born 16 April 1978) is a Mexican former professional footballer who played as a goalkeeper.

Born in Guadalajara, Toño Pérez began playing professional football with local Club Atlas, and he became the club's starting goalkeeper by early 2006.
