= 2012–13 Puebla F.C. season =

Puebla
2012–13 season
- Chairman: Ricardo Henaine
- Manager: Daniel Bartolotta (until August 17, 2012); Carlos Muñoz (interim) (August 17, 2012–August 21, 2012); Daniel Guzman (August 22, 2012–October 30, 2012); Carlos Poblete (interim) (October 30, 2012–December 4, 2012); Manuel Lapuente (from December 4, 2012)
- Stadium: Estadio Cuauhtémoc
- Apertura 2012: 16th
- Clausura 2013: 12th
- Copa MX (Apertura): Group stage
- Copa MX (Clausura): Semi-finals
- Top goalscorer: League: Apertura: Matías Alustiza (5); Clausura: Félix Borja (7); All: Matías Alustiza (16)
- Highest home attendance: Apertura: 22,288 vs América (October 25, 2012); Clausura: 37,363 vs Atlas (April 28, 2013)
- Lowest home attendance: Apertura: 7,652 vs Pachuca (October 3, 2012); Clausura: 17,135 vs UANL (March 31, 2013)
Home colours	Away colours

The 2012–13 Puebla season was the 66th professional season of Mexico's top-flight football league. The season is split into two tournaments—the Torneo Apertura and the Torneo Clausura—each with identical formats and each contested by the same eighteen teams. Puebla began their season on July 20, 2012 against Tijuana, Puebla play their homes games on Sundays at 12:00pm local time. Puebla did not qualify to the final phase in either the Apertura or Clausura tournament.

== Torneo Apertura ==
=== Squad ===
Note: Flags indicate national team as defined under FIFA eligibility rules; some limited exceptions apply. Players may hold more than one non-FIFA nationality.

No.	Pos.	Nation	Player
2	DF	MEX	Orlando Rincón
3	DF	MEX	Jaime Durán (on loan from Morelia)
4	DF	MEX	Jesús Roberto Chávez (on loan from Chiapas)
5	MF	MEX	Jorge Gastélum (on loan from Morelia)
6	MF	MEX	Diego De Buen (on loan from UNAM)
7	FW	MEX	Jair Garcia
8	MF	MEX	Aldo Polo
10	MF	ARG	Matías Abelairas (on loan from Vasco da Gama)
11	MF	USA	DaMarcus Beasley
13	DF	PAR	Herminio Miranda (on loan from Nacional)
14	FW	COL	Edison Toloza (on loan from Morelia)
15	FW	MEX	Mario Ortiz (on loan from Atlante)

No.	Pos.	Nation	Player
16	FW	MEX	Kevin Zapata
17	FW	MEX	Bernardo Sainz (on loan from Toros Neza)
18	FW	MEX	Brayan Martínez
19	FW	MEX	Isaac Romo (on loan from Cruz Azul)
21	MF	MEX	Efraín Dimayuga (on loan from Chiapas)
22	FW	ARG	Matías Alustiza (on loan from Deportivo Quito)
23	GK	MEX	Víctor Hugo Hernández (on loan from Guadalajara)
26	DF	MEX	Roberto Juárez (on loan from Cruz Azul)
27	DF	MEX	Francisco Pizano (on loan from Morelia)
29	MF	MEX	Hiber Ruíz (on loan from Chiapas)
33	GK	MEX	Alexandro Álvarez
—	FW	MEX	Roberto Ruiz Esparza Jr. (on loan from BUAP)

=== Regular season ===
Win Draw Loss

==== Apertura 2012 results ====
July 20, 2012 Round 1	Tijuana	2–0	Puebla	Tijuana, Baja California
19:30	Arce 11'; Martínez (yellow card) 62'; Aguilar 70'; Gandolfi (yellow card) 81'	Report	Gastélum (yellow card) 10'; Durán (yellow card) 73'; Miranda (yellow card) 75'; Álvarez (yellow card) 85'	Stadium: Estadio Caliente; Referee: Fabricio Morales

July 29, 2012 Round 2	Puebla	1–3	Toluca	Puebla, Puebla
12:00	Toloza 33'; Miranda (yellow card) 43' (yellow-red card) 73'; Gatélum (yellow card) 90'	Report	Lucas Silva (yellow card) 18', (goal) 22', 64'; Ríos (yellow card) 25'; Wilson Mathías 44'	Stadium: Estadio Cuauhtémoc; Referee: Victor Bisguera Mendiola

August 3, 2012 Round 3	Santos Laguna	2–2	Puebla	Torreón, Coahuila
19:00	Qunitero 5'; Gómez 14'	Report	Alustiza (yellow card) 64', (goal) 65', 80'; Chávez (yellow card) 67'	Stadium: Estadio TSM Corona; Attendance: 20,364; Referee: Francisco Chacón

August 12, 2012 Round 4	Puebla	0–1	Cruz Azul	Puebla, Puebla
12:00	Beasley (yellow card) 18'; Chávez (red card) 32'	Report	Perea (yellow card) 44'; Vela (yellow card) 51'; Barrera (yellow card) 65'; Pavone 82'	Stadium: Estadio Cuauhtémoc; Attendance: 9,996; Referee: Jorge Antonio Pérez

August 17, 2012 Round 5	Morelia	3–0	Puebla	Morelia, Michoacán
21:30	Rojas 44'; Morales 45+'; Sabah 77'; Huiqui (yellow card) 81'	Report	Gastélum (yellow card) 45+'; Polo (yellow card) 75'	Stadium: Estadio Morelos; Attendance: 11,659; Referee: Roberto García Orozco

August 26, 2012 Round 6	Puebla	1–0	San Luis	Puebla, Puebla
12:00	de Buen 2'; García (yellow card) 19'; Romo (yellow card) 27'; Martínez (yellow card) 52'; Alustiza (yellow card) 68'; Beasley (yellow card) 72'	Report	Everton Bilher (yellow card) 5'; Correa (yellow card) 53'; Mendoza (yellow card) 65'; Fernández (yellow card) 70'	Stadium: Estadio Cuauhtémoc; Referee: Miguel Ángel Flores

September 2, 2012 Round 7	Guadalajara	1–1	Puebla	Zapopan, Jalisco
17:00	Reynoso (yellow card) 29'; Morales 81'; Araujo (yellow card) 90+2'	Report	Gastélum (yellow card) 1'; Chávez 31'	Stadium: Estadio Omnilife; Referee: Fabricio Morales

September 16, 2012 Round 8	Puebla	2–3	Monterrey	Puebla, Puebla
12:00	Gastélum (yellow card) 55'; De Buen 51'; Miranda (yellow card) 63'; Romo 71'; Pizano (yellow card) 72'	Report	Delgado 27'; Solís (yellow card) 44' de Nigris 45+3'; Basanta (yellow card) 58'; Reyna 75'	Stadium: Estadio Cuauhtémoc; Attendance: 10,132; Referee: Mauricio Morales

September 21, 2012 Round 9	Puebla	1–1	León	Puebla, Puebla
19:30	Dimayuga (yellow card) 1'; Abelairas (yellow card) 44', (goal) 66'; Chávez (yellow card) 77'	Report	Maz 27'; González (yellow card) 36'; Montes (yellow card) 68'	Stadium: Estadio Cuauhtémoc; Attendance: 10,128; Referee: José Alfredo Peñaloza

September 30, 2012 Round 10	UNAM	2–1	Puebla	Mexico City
12:00	Bravo 58'; Herrera 65'	Report	Alustiza 69'; Polo (yellow card) 87'; Dimayuga (yellow card) 90'	Stadium: Estadio Olímpico Universitario; Attendance: 16,300; Referee: Óscar Macías Romo

October 3, 2012 Round 11	Puebla	2–0	Pachuca	Puebla, Puebla
19:00	De Buen (yellow card) 22'; Romo 36'; Hernández (yellow card) 80'; Alustiza 89'	Report	Torres (yellow card) 65'; López (yellow card) 69'	Stadium: Estadio Cuauhtémoc; Attendance: 7,652; Referee: Francisco Chacón

October 6, 2012 Round 12	UANL	1–2	Puebla	San Nicolás de los Garza, Nuevo León
19:00	Álvarez 13', (yellow card) 85'; Zamora (yellow card) 48'	Report	Durán (yellow card) 12'; Dimayuga (yellow card) 16' (yellow-red card) 89'; Chávez 62'; Gastélum (yellow card) 57'; Toloza 78'; Alustiza (yellow card) 90+3'	Stadium: Estadio Universitario; Referee: Jorge Isaac Rojas

October 25, 2012 Round 13	Puebla	0–1	América	Puebla, Puebla
21:00	de Buen (yellow card) 85'; Martínez (yellow card) 88'; Chávez (yellow card) 90+4'	Report	Molina 34', (yellow card) 65'; Reyes (yellow card) 55'; Aldrete (yellow card) 90+1'	Stadium: Estadio Cuauhtémoc; Attendance: 22,288; Referee: Fernando Guerrero

October 19, 2012 Round 14	Chiapas	2–0	Puebla	Tuxtla Gutiérrez, Chiapas
19:30	Arizala (yellow card) 35'; Jiménez 46'; Corral (yellow card) 56'; Rodríguez 90'	Report	Miranda (yellow card) 48'	Stadium: Estadio Victor Manuel Reyna; Attendance: 9,591; Referee: Miguel Ángel Ayala

October 28, 2012 Round 15	Puebla	1–2	Atlante	Puebla, Puebla
12:00	Abelairas (yellow card) 51'; Miranda 64'	Report	Paredes 4'; Fonseca 90+1'	Stadium: Estadio Cuauhtémoc; Attendance: 10,684; Referee: Fabricio Morales

November 4, 2012 Round 16	Atlas	2–2	Puebla	Guadalajara, Jalisco
16:00	Torres 8'; Cufré (yellow card) 35'; González 41'; Santana (red card) 83'; Vusoso (yellow card) 84'	Report	Alustiza 34' (pen.); Durán (yellow card) 75'; Polo 90+4'	Stadium: Estadio Jalisco; Attendance: 15,000+ Referee: José Alfredo Peñaloza

November 11, 2012 Round 17	Puebla	0–1	Querétaro	Puebla, Puebla
12:00		Report	Landín 12'; Pineda (yellow card) 14' (yellow-red card) 68'; Escalante (yellow card) 51'; García (yellow card) 81'; Vera (yellow card) 90+4'	Stadium: Estadio Cuauhtémoc; Attendance: 11,160; Referee: Jorge Antonio Pérez

=== Goalscorers ===
Position	Nation	Name	Goals scored
1.	(Argentina)	Matías Alustiza	5
2.	(Mexico)	Jesús Roberto Chávez	2
2.	(Mexico)	Diego De Buen	2
2.	(Mexico)	Isaac Romo	2
2.	(Colombia)	Edison Toloza	2
6.	(Argentina)	Matías Abelairas	1
6.	(Paraguay)	Herminio Miranda	1
6.	(Mexico)	Aldo Polo	1
TOTAL			16

=== Results ===
==== Results summary ====
Overall								Home						Away					
Pld	W	D	L	GF	GA	GD	Pts	W	D	L	GF	GA	GD	W	D	L	GF	GA	GD
17	3	4	10	16	27	−11	13	2	1	6	8	12	−4	1	3	4	8	15	−7

Last updated: 11 November 2012.
Source: Apertura 2012 results

==== Results by round ====
Round	1	2	3	4	5	6	7	8	9	10	11	12	13	14	15	16	17
Ground	A	H	A	H	A	H	A	H	H	A	H	A	H	A	H	A	H
Result	L	L	D	L	L	W	D	L	D	L	W	W	L	L	L	D	L
Position	16	16	16	16	17	16	15	17	17	17	17	15	15	16	16	16	16

Updated to match(es) played on 11 November 2012. Source: Apertura 2012 results and mediotiempo.com
A = Away; H = Home; W = Win; D = Draw; L = Loss

== Apertura 2012 Copa MX ==
=== Group stage ===
Win Draw Loss

==== Apertura results ====
July 25, 2012 1	Irapuato	3–2	Puebla	Irapuato, Guanajuato
19:00	González 2', 83'; Jiménez 69', (yellow card) 87'; Balcázar (yellow card) 80'; Dos Santos (yellow card) 84'	Report	Pizano (yellow card) 23'; Chávez 36'; De Buen 47'	Stadium: Estadio Sergio León Chavez; Referee: Uriel Olvera

August 1, 2012 2	Puebla	0–2	Irapuato	Puebla, Puebla
21:00	Romo (yellow card) 41'; Diamyuga (yellow card) 76'; Miranda (yellow card) 86'	Report	Hernández (yellow card) 38'; Rey 73'; Balcázar 77'; Guillén (yellow card) 90+2'	Stadium: Estadio Cuauhtémoc; Referee: Jorge Isaac Rojas

August 7, 2012 3	Puebla	2–0	BUAP	Puebla, Puebla
21:00	Durán (yellow card) 27'; Miranda 34'; Abelairas 48' (pen.); Rincón (yellow card) 73'; Romo (yellow card) 81'	Report	Diego Souza (yellow card) 71'; Bello (yellow card) 79'; Gutiérrez (red card) 85'	Stadium: Estadio Cuauhtémoc; Attendance: 4,950; Referee: Miguel Ángel Flores

August 21, 2012 4	BUAP	0–2	Puebla	Puebla, Puebla
21:00	Tehuitzil (yellow card) 35'; Diego (yellow card) 48'; Diego Souza (yellow card) 72'; Ruvalcaba (yellow card) 90+2'	Report	García 27'; Martínez 30'; Romo (yellow card) 37'; Pizano (yellow card) 47'	Stadium: Estadio Olímpico de la BUAP; Referee: León Barajas

August 30, 2012 5	Puebla	1–0	Toluca	Puebla, Puebla
19:00	Abelairas (yellow card) 7'; Ortiz 36'	Report	Trejo (yellow card) 26'; Galeana (yellow card) 88'	Stadium: Estadio Cuauhtémoc; Attendance: 4,164; Referee: Óscar Macías Romo

September 18, 2012 6	Toluca	2–0	Puebla	Toluca, Estado de Mexico
19:00	Pizano 49' (o.g.); Esquivel 75'	Report	Juárez (yellow card) 35'; Polo (yellow card) 35'; Pizano (yellow card) 88'	Stadium: Estadio Nemesio Díez; Attendance: 4,298; Referee: Fernando Guerrero

=== Goalscorers ===
Position	Nation	Name	Goals scored
1.	(Argentina)	Matías Abelairas	1
1.	(Mexico)	Jesús Roberto Chávez	1
1.	(Mexico)	Diego De Buen	1
1.	(Mexico)	Jair García	1
1.	(Mexico)	Brayan Martínez	1
1.	(Paraguay)	Herminio Miranda	1
1.	(Mexico)	Rafael Ortiz	1
TOTAL			7

=== Results ===
==== Results by round ====
Round	1	2	3	4	5	6
Ground	A	H	H	A	H	A
Result	L	L	W	W	W	L
Position	3	4	4	2	1	2

Updated to match(es) played on 18 September 2012. Source: Apertura results and mediotiempo.com
A = Away; H = Home; W = Win; D = Draw; L = Loss

== Torneo Clausura ==
=== Squad ===
Note: Flags indicate national team as defined under FIFA eligibility rules; some limited exceptions apply. Players may hold more than one non-FIFA nationality.

No.	Pos.	Nation	Player
1	GK	MEX	Antonio Iriarte
2	DF	URU	Jonathan Lacerda
3	DF	MEX	Jaime Durán
4	DF	MEX	Jesús Roberto Chávez (vice-captain)
5	MF	MEX	Diego Vera
6	MF	MEX	Diego De Buen
7	MF	MEX	Luis Miguel Noriega
8	FW	MEX	Emmanuel Cerda
9	FW	ECU	Félix Borja
10	FW	MEX	Alberto Medina
11	MF	USA	DaMarcus Beasley
12	DF	MEX	William Paredes
13	MF	ECU	Segundo Castillo
14	DF	USA	Michael Orozco Fiscal
15	FW	MEX	Brayan Martínez
16	FW	MEX	Isaac Romo
17	MF	MEX	Fernando Leonel Cortés
18	MF	MEX	Efraín Dimayuga

No.	Pos.	Nation	Player
19	FW	ARG	Matías Alustiza
20	GK	MEX	Víctor Hugo Hernández
21	MF	MEX	Eduardo Arce
22	DF	MEX	Roberto Juárez
23	MF	MEX	Hiber Ruíz
24	MF	MEX	Eduardo Morodo
25	DF	MEX	Paris Pérez
26	GK	MEX	Alexandro Álvarez (captain)
27	FW	MEX	Rafael Ortiz
28	DF	MEX	Abraham Ruíz
29	FW	MEX	Juan Francisco Sillero
30	MF	MEX	Patricio Sánchez
31	MF	MEX	Pablo González
32	GK	MEX	Jesús Rodríguez
33	MF	MEX	Aldair Santana
34	DF	MEX	Carlos Alberto Poblete
35	FW	USA	Alejandro Lobato

=== Regular season ===
Win Draw Loss

==== Clausura 2013 results ====
January 6, 2013 Round 1	Puebla	1–2	Tijuana	Puebla, Puebla
16:00	Juárez 45'	Report	Riascos 30'; Pellerano 40'; Castillo (yellow card) 60'; Martínez (yellow card) 80'	Stadium: Estadio Cuauhtémoc; Attendance: 23,444; Referee: Oscar Macías Romo

January 13, 2013 Round 2	Toluca	1–1	Puebla	Toluca, Estado de México
12:00	Benítez (yellow card) 52'; Lucas Silva 88'	Report	Noriega (yellow card) 27'; Borja 62'; Lacerda (yellow card) 67'	Stadium: Estadio Nemesio Díez; Attendance: 9,853; Referee: Miguel Ángel Flores

January 20, 2013 Round 3	Puebla	2–1	Santos Laguna	Puebla, Puebla
12:00	Borjas 33'; Paredes (yellow card) 71'; Durán (yellow card) 89'; Noriega 90+2'	Report	Peralta 56'; Rodríguez (yellow card) 68'; Baloy (yellow card) 90+1'	Stadium: Estadio Cuauhtémoc; Attendance: 18,845; Referee: Antony Zanjuampa

January 26, 2013 Round 4	Cruz Azul	4–0	Puebla	Benito Juárez, Mexico City
17:00	Giménez 34'; Pavone 45+3'; Gutiérrez 51'; Aquino 61'	Report	Beasley (yellow card) 36'; Noriega (yellow card) 48'; Dimayuga (yellow card) 55'	Stadium: Estadio Azul; Attendance: 23,030; Referee: César Arturo Ramos

February 3, 2013 Round 5	Puebla	3–1	Morelia	Puebla, Puebla
12:00	Huiqui 15' (o.g.); Noriega (yellow card) 19'; Borja 26'; Lacerda (yellow card) 44'; Alustiza 90+3', (yellow card) 90+3'	Report	Mancilla 21', (red card) 90+4'; Ramírez (yellow card) 28'; Rojas (yellow card) 65'; Pérez (yellow card) 79'; Morales (red card) 88'	Stadium: Estadio Cuauhtémoc; Attendance: 26,000; Referee: Marco Antonio Rodríguez

February 9, 2013 Round 6	San Luis	1–3	Puebla	San Luis Potosí, San Luis Potosí
21:00	Zamora (yellow card) 5'; Jiménez 14'; Araujo (yellow card) 72'; Muñoz (yellow card) 76'	Report	Borja 1'; Orozco (yellow card) 16'; Beasley (yellow card) 66', (goal) 81', 88'	Stadium: Estadio Alfonso Lastras; Attendance: 6,847; Referee: Jorge Antonio Pérez

February 17, 2013 Round 7	Puebla	1–1	Guadalajara	Puebla, Puebla
16:00	Borja 52'	Report	Fabián 54'; Ponce (yellow card) 87'	Stadium: Estadio Cuauhtémoc; Referee: Ricardo Arellano

February 23, 2012 Round 8	Monterrey	3–0	Puebla	Monterrey, Nuevo León
19:00	de Nigris 23', 70', (yellow card) 85'; Suazo 55' (pen.)	Report	González (yellow card) 43'; Orozco (red card) 53'; Noriega (yellow card) 71'	Stadium: Estadio Tecnológico; Referee: Jorge Isaac Rojas

March 2, 2013 Round 9	León	0–1	Puebla	León, Guanajuato
20:06	Peña (yellow card) 28'; Delgado (yellow card) 73'	Report	González (yellow card) 8'; Beasley (yellow card) 25'; Hernández (yellow card) 37' de Buen 52'; Durán (yellow card) 71' (yellow-red card) 90+4'; Medina (yellow card) 90+4'	Stadium: Estadio León; Attendance: 26,123; Referee: Miguel Ángel Ayala

March 10, 2013 Round 10	Puebla	0–1	UNAM	Puebla, Puebla
16:00	Cabrera (yellow card) 21'; Chávez (yellow card) 37'; Castillo (yellow card) 82'	Report	Bravo (yellow card) 59', (goal) 89'	Stadium: Estadio Cuauhtémoc; Attendance: 27,239; Referee: Marco Antonio Rodríguez

March 16, 2013 Round 11	Pachuca	2–1	Puebla	Pachuca, Hidalgo
19:00	Arreola (yellow card) 26'; Carreño 89'; Reyna 90+2'	Report	de Buen 26'; Romo (yellow card) 31'; Durán (yellow card) 77'	Stadium: Estadio Hidalgo; Referee: César Arturo Ramos

March 31, 2013 Round 12	Puebla	1–2	UANL	Puebla, Puebla
12:00	Medina (yellow card) 19'; Beasley 57'; Paredes (yellow card) 83'	Report	Luis García 32'; Torres Nilo (yellow card) 77'; Pulido 86'	Stadium: Estadio Cuauhtémoc; Attendance: 17,135; Referee: Miguel Ángel Chacón

April 6, 2013 Round 13	América	1–1	Puebla	Coyoacán, Mexico City
17:00	Aguilar (yellow card) 17'; F. Rodríguez (yellow card) 24'; Layún 71'	Report	de Buen (yellow card) 17'; Orozco (yellow card) 21'; V. Hernández (yellow card) 55'; Borja 61'; Medina (yellow card) 85'	Stadium: Estadio Azteca; Attendance: 22,948; Referee: Miguel Ángel Ortega

April 13, 2013 Round 14	Puebla	1–2	Chiapas	Puebla, Puebla
12:00	Orozco (yellow card) 44'; Beasley 69'; Lacerda (yellow card) 90+3'	Report	Loroña 13', (yellow card) 48'; Jiménez (yellow card) 39'; Bedolla (yellow card) 52'; Zamorano (yellow card) 76'; Rodríguez 85'	Stadium: Estadio Cuauhtémoc; Attendance: 17,149; Referee: Jorge Isaac Rojas

April 21, 2013 Round 15	Atlante	2–0	Puebla	Cancún, Quintana Roo
17:00	Paredes 11', 88'; Vera (yellow card) 44'; Quiroz (yellow card) 90'	Report	Paredes (yellow card) 31'	Stadium: Estadio Andrés Quintana Roo; Attendance: 4,300; Referee: Roberto García Orozco

April 28, 2013 Round 16	Puebla	1–1	Atlas	Puebla, Puebla
12:00	Vuoso 80'	Report	Lacerda 84'	Stadium: Estadio Cuauhtémoc; Attendance: 37,363; Referee: José Alfredo Peñaloza

May 4, 2013 Round 17	Querétaro	2–3	Puebla	Querétaro, Querétaro
21:00	Chávez 73' (o.g.); Cosme 76'; Escalante (yellow card) 79'	Report	Lacerda (yellow card) 34'; Borja 38', (yellow card) 73'; Noriega (yellow card) 39'; Orozco (yellow card) 54'; Alustiza 69', 79' (pen.)	Stadium: Estadio Corregidora; Attendance: 26,670; Referee: Paúl Delgadillo

Puebla did not qualify to the Final Phase

=== Goalscorers ===
Position	Nation	Name	Goals scored
1.	(Ecuador)	Félix Borja	7
2.	(United States)	DaMarcus Beasley	4
3.	(Argentina)	Matías Alustiza	3
4.	(Mexico)	Diego De Buen	2
5.	(Mexico)	Roberto Juárez	1
5.	(Uruguay)	Jonathan Lacerda	1
5.	(Mexico)	Luis Miguel Noriega	1
5.		Own Goals	1
TOTAL			20

=== Results ===
==== Results summary ====
Overall								Home						Away					
Pld	W	D	L	GF	GA	GD	Pts	W	D	L	GF	GA	GD	W	D	L	GF	GA	GD
17	5	4	8	20	27	−7	19	2	2	4	11	12	−1	3	2	4	9	15	−6

Last updated: 4 May 2013.
Source: Clausura 2013 results

==== Results by round ====
Round	1	2	3	4	5	6	7	8	9	10	11	12	13	14	15	16	17
Ground	H	A	H	A	H	A	H	A	A	H	A	H	A	H	A	H	A
Result	L	D	W	L	W	W	D	L	W	L	L	L	D	L	L	D	W
Position	16	15	10	13	9	6	6	10	7	10	13	14	14	14	14	14	12

Updated to match(es) played on 5 May 2013. Source: Clausura 2013 results and mediotiempo.com
A = Away; H = Home; W = Win; D = Draw; L = Loss

== Clausura 2013 Copa MX ==
=== Group stage ===
Win Draw Loss

==== Clausura results ====
January 17, 2013 1	Puebla	4–0	Celaya	Puebla, Puebla
21:00	Borja 22', (yellow card) 84'; Castillo (yellow card) 30', (goal) 35'; Dimayuga (yellow card) 42'; Noriega 43'; Alustiza 74'	Report	Islas (yellow card) 9'; Ramos (yellow card) 29'; Torres (yellow card) 29'; Riestra (red card) 55'	Stadium: Estadio Cuauhtémoc; Attendance: 6,195; Referee: Víctor Bisguerra Mendiola

January 23, 2013 2	Celaya	1–4	Puebla	Celaya, Guanajuato
21:00	Ocampo 15'; Fernández (yellow card) 45' (yellow-red card) 59'; Vítor Hugo (yellow card) 52'	Report	Alustiza 1', 85', 87'; Medina 6'; De Buen (yellow card) 24'; Juárez (yellow card) 27'	Stadium: Estadio Miguel Alemán; Attendance: 3,280; Referee: Oscar Bernardo Villagómez

February 13, 2013 3	Puebla	3–1	Mérida	Puebla, Puebla
19:00	Alustiza 7', 40', 67'; Cerda (yellow card) 20'; Romo (yellow card) 42'; Juárez (yellow card) 56'	Report	Guadarrama (yellow card) 9'; Fierros (yellow card) 22'; Charles (yellow card) 54'; Ruiz 83'	Stadium: Estadio Cuauhtémoc; Attendance: 5,140; Referee: Luis Enrique Santander

February 19, 2013 4	Mérida	0–0	Puebla	Mérida, Yucatán
19:00	Garduño (yellow card) 90'	Report	Arce (yellow card) 21'; Vera (yellow card) 37'; Santana (yellow card) 72'; Martínez (yellow card) 75'; Álvarez (yellow card) 83'	Stadium: Estadio Carlos Iturralde; Attendance: 2,612; Referee: Jorge Adan Tonix Vázquez

February 27, 2013 5	UNAM	1–1	Puebla	Coyoacán, Mexico City
21:00	Bravo 32'; Espinoza (yellow card) 62'; Nieto (yellow card) 69'; Rodríguez (yellow card) 88'	Report	Romo (yellow card) 49', (goal) 52'; Durán (yellow card) 85'	Stadium: Estadio Olímpico Universitario; Attendance: 6,315; Referee: Víctor Bisguerra

March 6, 2013 6	Puebla	0–3	UNAM	Puebla, Puebla
21:00	Dimayuga (yellow card) 34'; Martínez (yellow card) 60'	Report	Luis García 56', 64'; Mendoza 66'	Stadium: Estadio Cuauhtémoc; Attendance: 11,241; Referee: Oscar Macías

=== Knockout stage ===
March 13, 2013 Quarter-finals	Pachuca	1–1 (3–5 p)	Puebla	Pachuca, Hidalgo
19:00	Hurtado (yellow card) 52'; Carreño 80'	Report	Durán (yellow card) 11'; Orozco (yellow card) 38' (yellow-red card) 89'; Medina (yellow card) 71'; Beasley 55'	Stadium: Estadio Hidalgo; Attendance: 10,426; Referee: Jorge Isaac Rojas
	Penalties
	Cavenaghi (penalty scored); Ledesma (penalty missed); Carreño (penalty scored); H. Herrera (penalty scored)		(penalty scored) Noriega; (penalty scored) Castillo; (penalty scored) Lacerda; (penalty scored) de Buen; (penalty scored) Romo

April 3, 2013 Semi-finals	Atlante	1–1 (5–4 p)	Puebla	Cancún, Quintana Roo
19:00	Amione (yellow card) 53'; Paredes 79' (pen.)	Report	de Buen (yellow card) 21'; Lacerda (yellow card) 38'; Medina (yellow card) 55'; Romo 72'	Stadium: Estadio Andrés Quintana Roo; Attendance: 9,295; Referee: Jorge Antonio Pérez
	Penalties
	Fonseca (penalty scored); García (penalty scored); Bizera (penalty missed); Villalpando (penalty scored); Paredes (penalty missed); Vera (penalty scored); Venegas (penalty scored)		(penalty scored) Noriega; (penalty scored) Paredes; (penalty scored) Lacerda; (penalty missed) González; (penalty missed) Romo; (penalty scored) Arce; (penalty missed) Durán

=== Goalscorers ===
Position	Nation	Name	Goals scored
1.	(Argentina)	Matías Alustiza	7
2.	(Mexico)	Isaac Romo	2
3.	(Ecuador)	Félix Borja	1
3.	(United States)	DaMarcus Beasley	1
3.	(Ecuador)	Segundo Castillo	1
3.	(Mexico)	Alberto Medina	1
3.	(Mexico)	Luis Miguel Noriega	1
TOTAL			14

=== Results ===
==== Results by round ====
Round	1	2	3	4	5	6
Ground	H	A	H	A	A	H
Result	W	W	W	D	D	W
Position	1	1	1	1	1	1

Updated to match(es) played on 6 March 2013. Source: Clausura results and mediotiempo.com
A = Away; H = Home; W = Win; D = Draw; L = Loss
