= List of Mexican football transfers summer 2012 =

This is a not a list of Mexican football transfers in the Mexican Primera Division during the summer 2012 transfer window, grouped by club. It only includes football clubs from Liga MX, the first division of Mexican football.

== Mexican Primera Division ==
=== America ===
In: Note: Flags indicate national team as defined under FIFA eligibility rules; some limited exceptions apply. Players may hold more than one non-FIFA nationality.

No.	Pos.	Nation	Player
4	MF	MEX	Efraín Juárez (from (Scotland) Celtic)
14	MF	ARG	Rubens Sambueza (from Estudiantes Tecos)
20	DF	MEX	Adrián Aldrete (from Morelia)

Out: Note: Flags indicate national team as defined under FIFA eligibility rules; some limited exceptions apply. Players may hold more than one non-FIFA nationality.

No.	Pos.	Nation	Player
4	DF	MEX	Óscar Rojas (on loan to Pachuca)
30	FW	MEX	Vicente Matías Vuoso (to Atlas)
—	GK	MEX	Armando Navarrete (on loan to Necaxa, previously on loan at Atlante)
––	DF	USA	Edgar Castillo (to Tijuana, previously on loan)
––	DF	MEX	George Corral (on loan to Chiapas, previously on loan)
—	MF	MEX	Lugiani Gallardo (on loan to Necaxa)
—	MF	MEX	Renato González (on loan to Mérida)
—	MF	MEX	Luis Olascoaga (on loan to Necaxa)

=== Atlante ===
In: Note: Flags indicate national team as defined under FIFA eligibility rules; some limited exceptions apply. Players may hold more than one non-FIFA nationality.

No.	Pos.	Nation	Player
13	MF	MEX	Óscar Rojas (on loan from UNAM, previously on loan)
23	GK	MEX	Jorge Villalpando (from Atlas)
17	MF	MEX	Ignacio Torres (from San Luis)
9	MF	CPV	Valdo (from (Spain) Levante)
7	FW	CHI	Esteban Paredes (from (Chile) Colo-Colo)

Out: Note: Flags indicate national team as defined under FIFA eligibility rules; some limited exceptions apply. Players may hold more than one non-FIFA nationality.

No.	Pos.	Nation	Player
7	MF	MEX	Jorge Hernández (on loan to Tijuana)
11	FW	MEX	Mario Ortiz (on loan to Puebla)
—	GK	MEX	Armando Navarrete (loan return to América)

=== Atlas ===
In: Note: Flags indicate national team as defined under FIFA eligibility rules; some limited exceptions apply. Players may hold more than one non-FIFA nationality.

No.	Pos.	Nation	Player
9	FW	CHI	Héctor Mancilla (from UANL)
10	MF	ECU	Luis Bolaños (on loan from (Brazil) Internacional, previously on loan at (Ecuador) LDU Quito)
12	DF	MEX	Christian Sánchez (loan return from San Luis)
16	DF	MEX	Sergio Amaury Ponce (from Guadalajara, previously on loan at Querétaro)
17	FW	MEX	Luis Alonso Sandoval (from Necaxa, previously on loan at Morelia)
30	FW	MEX	Vicente Matías Vuoso (from América)

Out: Note: Flags indicate national team as defined under FIFA eligibility rules; some limited exceptions apply. Players may hold more than one non-FIFA nationality.

No.	Pos.	Nation	Player
6	MF	MEX	Francisco Torres (loan return to Santos Laguna)
12	DF	MEX	Rogelio Chávez (loan return to Cruz Azul)
13	GK	MEX	Jorge Villalpando (to Atlante)
16	DF	MEX	Alonso Zamora (to UANL)
18	MF	MEX	Jesús Paganoni (on loan to Toluca)
19	MF	MEX	Saúl Villalobos (on loan to León)
22	DF	MEX	Guillermo Rojas (loan return to Chiapas)
––	MF	MEX	Efrén Mendoza (on loan to Pachuca)
—	FW	VEN	Giancarlo Maldonado (on loan to (Venezuela) Mineros de Guayana)

=== Chiapas ===
In: Note: Flags indicate national team as defined under FIFA eligibility rules; some limited exceptions apply. Players may hold more than one non-FIFA nationality.

No.	Pos.	Nation	Player
7	DF	MEX	Yasser Corona (on loan from Morelia, previously on loan)
8	DF	MEX	George Corral (on loan from América, previously on loan)
14	MF	MEX	Luis Miguel Noriega (on loan from Morelia, previously on loan)
20	FW	COL	Franco Arizala (from Pachuca, previously on loan)
35	DF	MEX	Jesús Castillo (unattached)
—	DF	COL	Leiton Jiménez (from (Colombia) Independiente Medellín)
28	MF	GUA	José Carlos Castillo (from (India) Durgapur)
13	MF	MEX	Elgabry Rangel (on loan from Estudiantes Tecos)
8	MF	MEX	Alan Zamora (loan return from Puebla)
9	FW	COL	Jhon Córdoba (from (Colombia) Envigado)
12	FW	MEX	Antonio Salazar (on loan from Guadalajara)
26	FW	MEX	Jorge Zárate (on loan from Puebla, previously on loan at Lobos BUAP)

Out: Note: Flags indicate national team as defined under FIFA eligibility rules; some limited exceptions apply. Players may hold more than one non-FIFA nationality.

No.	Pos.	Nation	Player
9	FW	COL	Jackson Martínez (to (Portugal) Porto)
15	MF	MEX	Jorge Daniel Hernández (to Pachuca)
17	MF	MEX	Hiber Ruíz (on loan to Puebla)
45	MF	MEX	Efraín Dimayuga (on loan to Puebla)
––	DF	MEX	Óscar Razo (on loan to Morelia, previously on loan)
––	DF	MEX	Guillermo Rojas (on loan to San Luis, previously on loan at Atlas)
––	MF	MEX	Christian Valdéz (on loan to Morelia, previously on loan)

=== Cruz Azul ===
In: Note: Flags indicate national team as defined under FIFA eligibility rules; some limited exceptions apply. Players may hold more than one non-FIFA nationality.

No.	Pos.	Nation	Player
5	DF	MEX	Alejandro Castro (loan return from Estudiantes Tecos)
28	DF	MEX	Rogelio Chávez (loan return from Atlas)
14	DF	COL	Luis Amaranto Perea (from (Spain) Atlético Madrid)
20	FW	ARG	Mariano Pavone (from (Argentina) Lanús)
17	MF	MEX	Pablo Barrera (from (England) West Ham United)

Out: Note: Flags indicate national team as defined under FIFA eligibility rules; some limited exceptions apply. Players may hold more than one non-FIFA nationality.

No.	Pos.	Nation	Player
30	FW	ARG	Emmanuel Villa (to UNAM)
--	DF	MEX	Joel Huiqui (to Morelia, previously on loan)
––	MF	MEX	Jaime Lozano (to UNAM, previously on loan at Morelia)
––	MF	MEX	Edgar Gerardo Lugo (to Morelia, previously on loan)
9	FW	COL	Edixon Perea (to (China) Changchun Yatai)

=== Guadalajara ===
In: Note: Flags indicate national team as defined under FIFA eligibility rules; some limited exceptions apply. Players may hold more than one non-FIFA nationality.

No.	Pos.	Nation	Player
30	GK	MEX	Liborio Sánchez (loan return from Querétaro)
27	DF	MEX	Christian Pérez (loan return from Querétaro)
8	MF	MEX	Luis Ernesto Pérez (from Monterrey)
7	FW	MEX	Rafael Márquez Lugo (from Morelia)
15	FW	MEX	Jesús Padilla (loan return from La Piedad)

Out: Note: Flags indicate national team as defined under FIFA eligibility rules; some limited exceptions apply. Players may hold more than one non-FIFA nationality.

No.	Pos.	Nation	Player
3	DF	MEX	Dionicio Escalante (on loan to Querétaro)
10	FW	MEX	Alberto Medina (to Pachuca)
19	DF	MEX	Jonny Magallón (to León)
20	MF	MEX	Edgar Mejía (on loan to León)
21	FW	MEX	Antonio Salazar (on loan to Chiapas)
23	GK	MEX	Víctor Hugo Hernández (on loan to Puebla)
––	GK	MEX	Sergio García (on loan to Querétaro, previously on loan)
––	DF	MEX	Sergio Amaury Ponce (to Atlas, previously on loan at Querétaro)
––	DF	MEX	Arturo Ledesma (on loan to Pachuca, previously on loan)
24	MF	MEX	Jorge Mora (on loan to Correcaminos UAT)
—	MF	MEX	Gonzalo Pineda (on loan to Querétaro, previously on loan at Puebla F.C.)
––	MF	MEX	Edgar Solis (on loan to Monterrey, previously on loan at Estudiantes Tecos)

=== León ===
In: Note: Flags indicate national team as defined under FIFA eligibility rules; some limited exceptions apply. Players may hold more than one non-FIFA nationality.

No.	Pos.	Nation	Player
—	GK	MEX	Édgar Hernández (on loan from Pachuca, previously on loan)
—	GK	MEX	Christían Martínez (on loan from Estudiantes Tecos)
—	GK	MEX	Arturo Ortiz (on loan from Monterrey)
—	GK	MEX	William Paul Yarbrough (on loan from Pachuca, previously on loan)
—	DF	MEX	Duilio Davino (from Estudiantes Tecos)
—	DF	MEX	Jonny Magallón (from Guadalajara)
—	DF	MEX	Óscar Mascorro (on loan from San Luis, previously on loan)
—	DF	ARG	Javier Muñoz Mustafá (on loan from Pachuca)
—	MF	MEX	Juan José Calderón (on loan from Toluca)
—	MF	MEX	Edgar Mejía (on loan from Guadalajara)
—	MF	MEX	Luis Montes (on loan from Pachuca, previously on loan)
—	MF	MEX	Édgar Pacheco (on loan from UANL)
—	MF	MEX	Carlos Alberto Peña (on loan from Pachuca, previously on loan)
—	MF	MEX	Juan Carlos Pineda (on loan from Pachuca, previously on loan)
—	MF	MEX	Juan Carlos Rojas (on loan from Pachuca)
—	MF	MEX	Saúl Villalobos (on loan from Atlas)
—	FW	MEX	Othoniel Arce (on loan from Monterrey)
—	FW	URU	Matias Britos (from (Uruguay) Defensor Sporting)

Out: Note: Flags indicate national team as defined under FIFA eligibility rules; some limited exceptions apply. Players may hold more than one non-FIFA nationality.

No.	Pos.	Nation	Player
––	DF	MEX	Marco Iván Pérez (loan return to Pachuca)

=== Monterrey ===
In: Note: Flags indicate national team as defined under FIFA eligibility rules; some limited exceptions apply. Players may hold more than one non-FIFA nationality.

No.	Pos.	Nation	Player
7	MF	MEX	Edgar Solis (on loan from Guadalajara, previously on loan at Estudiantes Tecos)

Out: Note: Flags indicate national team as defined under FIFA eligibility rules; some limited exceptions apply. Players may hold more than one non-FIFA nationality.

No.	Pos.	Nation	Player
7	FW	MEX	Othoniel Arce (on loan to León)
8	MF	MEX	Luis Ernesto Pérez (to Guadalajara)
––	GK	MEX	Arturo Ortiz (on loan to León)
––	DF	MEX	David Stringel (on loan to Querétaro)
––	MF	MEX	Marvin Piñón (on loan to Querétaro, previously on loan at Correcaminos UAT)
––	FW	MEX	Brayan Martínez (on loan to Puebla, previously on loan)

=== Morelia ===
In: Note: Flags indicate national team as defined under FIFA eligibility rules; some limited exceptions apply. Players may hold more than one non-FIFA nationality.

No.	Pos.	Nation	Player
33	DF	MEX	Joel Huiqui (from Cruz Azul, previously on loan)
4	DF	MEX	Uriel Álvarez (on loan from Santos Laguna, previously on loan at Veracruz)
15	DF	MEX	Óscar Razo (on loan from Chiapas, previously on loan)
7	MF	ECU	Jefferson Montero (from (Spain) Villarreal, previously on loan at (Spain) Betis)
28	MF	MEX	Carlos Adrián Morales (from Santos Laguna)
29	MF	MEX	Rodrigo Salinas (on loan from Puebla)
22	MF	MEX	Francisco Torres (on loan from Santos Laguna)
26	MF	MEX	Christian Valdéz (on loan from Chiapas, previously on loan)
11	FW	MEX	Carlos Ochoa (on loan from Santos Laguna)
27	FW	MEX	Antonio Pedroza (on loan from (England) Crystal Palace)

Out: Note: Flags indicate national team as defined under FIFA eligibility rules; some limited exceptions apply. Players may hold more than one non-FIFA nationality.

No.	Pos.	Nation	Player
7	FW	MEX	Rafael Márquez Lugo (to Guadalajara)
8	MF	MEX	Jorge Gastelum (on loan to Puebla)
11	FW	MEX	Luis Alonso Sandoval (loan return to Necaxa)
14	FW	COL	Edison Toloza (on loan to Puebla)
15	MF	MEX	Felipe de Jesús Ayala (to Correcaminos UAT)
16	DF	MEX	Adrián Aldrete (to América)
21	MF	MEX	Jaime Lozano (loan return to Cruz Azul)
23	MF	MEX	Edgar Gerardo Lugo (to Santos Laguna)
24	DF	MEX	Marvin Cabrera (on loan to Toluca)
––	DF	MEX	Yasser Corona (on loan to Chiapas, previously on loan)
––	DF	MEX	Jaime Durán (on loan to Puebla, previously on loan)
––	DF	MEX	Adrián García Arias (on loan to Querétaro, previously on loan)
––	MF	MEX	Luis Miguel Noriega (on loan to Chiapas, previously on loan)

=== Pachuca ===
In: Note: Flags indicate national team as defined under FIFA eligibility rules; some limited exceptions apply. Players may hold more than one non-FIFA nationality.

No.	Pos.	Nation	Player
15	DF	MEX	Arturo Ledesma (on loan from Guadalajara, previously on loan)
4	DF	PAR	Paulo Da Silva (from (Spain) Real Zaragoza)
12	DF	MEX	Óscar Rojas (on loan from América)
16	MF	MEX	Jorge Daniel Hernández (from Chiapas)
32	MF	MEX	Efrén Mendoza (on loan from Atlas)
11	MF	MEX	Néstor Calderón (from Toluca)
7	FW	MEX	Alberto Medina (from Guadalajara)
21	FW	MEX	Nery Castillo (from (Greece) Aris)
23	FW	ESP	Raúl Tamudo (from (Spain) Rayo Vallecano)

Out: Note: Flags indicate national team as defined under FIFA eligibility rules; some limited exceptions apply. Players may hold more than one non-FIFA nationality.

No.	Pos.	Nation	Player
12	MF	MEX	Juan Carlos Rojas (on loan to León)
16	MF	MEX	Carlos Gerardo Rodríguez (to Toluca)
19	FW	MEX	Edy Brambila (to Toluca)
26	DF	ARG	Javier Muñoz Mustafá (on loan to León)
––	GK	MEX	Édgar Hernández (on loan to León, previously on loan)
––	GK	MEX	William Paul Yarbrough (on loan to León, previously on loan)
—	DF	MEX	Horacio Cervantes (on loan to Necaxa)
––	DF	MEX	Marco Iván Pérez (on loan to San Luis, previously on loan at León)
––	MF	MEX	Luis Montes (on loan to León, previously on loan)
––	MF	MEX	Carlos Alberto Peña (on loan from Pachuca, previously on loan)
––	MF	MEX	Juan Carlos Pineda (on loan to León, previously on loan)
––	MF	MEX	Juan Carlos Silva (on loan to San Luis, previously on loan at La Piedad)
––	FW	COL	Franco Arizala (to Chiapas, previously on loan)
—	FW	ECU	Jaime Ayoví (on loan to (Saudi Arabia) Al Nasr)
––	FW	PAR	Édgar Benítez (on loan to Toluca, previously on loan at (Paraguay) Cerro Porteño)

=== Puebla ===
In: Note: Flags indicate national team as defined under FIFA eligibility rules; some limited exceptions apply. Players may hold more than one non-FIFA nationality.

No.	Pos.	Nation	Player
—	GK	MEX	Víctor Hugo Hernández (on loan from Guadalajara)
—	DF	MEX	Jesús Chávez (on loan from UANL, previously on loan at San Luis)
—	DF	MEX	Jaime Durán (on loan from Morelia, previously on loan)
—	DF	PAR	Herminio Miranda (from (Paraguay) Nacional)
—	MF	ARG	Matías Abelairas (from (Brazil) Vasco da Gama)
—	MF	MEX	Diego de Buen (on loan from UNAM)
—	MF	MEX	Efraín Dimayuga (on loan from Chiapas)
—	MF	MEX	Jorge Gastelum (on loan from Morelia)
—	MF	MEX	Hiber Ruíz (on loan from Chiapas)
—	FW	ARG	Matias Alustiza (from (Ecuador) Deportivo Quito)
—	FW	MEX	Brayan Martínez (on loan from Monterrey, previously on loan)
—	FW	MEX	Mario Ortiz (on loan from Atlante)
—	FW	MEX	Isaac Romo (on loan from Queretaro)
—	FW	COL	Edison Toloza (on loan from Morelia)

Out: Note: Flags indicate national team as defined under FIFA eligibility rules; some limited exceptions apply. Players may hold more than one non-FIFA nationality.

No.	Pos.	Nation	Player
7	MF	MEX	Gonzalo Pineda (loan return to Guadalajara)
8	MF	MEX	Alan Zamora (loan return to Chiapas)
12	FW	ECU	Armando Wila (loan return to (Ecuador) Barcelona)
13	FW	MEX	Luis Ángel Landín (to Querétaro)
14	MF	ESP	Luis García (to UNAM)
17	MF	BRA	Lucas Silva (loan return to Sinaloa)
29	MF	MEX	Rodrigo Salinas (on loan to Morelia)
—	DF	URU	Jonathan Lacerda (loan return to Santos Laguna)
––	FW	MEX	Jorge Zárate (on loan to Chiapas, previously on loan at Lobos BUAP)

=== Querétaro ===
In: Note: Flags indicate national team as defined under FIFA eligibility rules; some limited exceptions apply. Players may hold more than one non-FIFA nationality.

No.	Pos.	Nation	Player
6	MF	MEX	Mitchel Oviedo (on loan from Guadalajara, previously on loan)
35	GK	MEX	Sergio García (on loan from Guadalajara, previously on loan)
—	GK	URU	Juan Castillo (from (Uruguay) Liverpool)
—	DF	MEX	Daniel Alcántar (on loan from San Luis)
—	DF	MEX	Adrián García Arias (on loan from Morelia, previously on loan)
—	DF	MEX	Dionicio Escalante (on loan from Guadalajara)
—	DF	MEX	Leonel Olmedo (on loan from San Luis, previously on loan at Irapuato)
—	DF	MEX	David Stringel (on loan from Monterrey)
—	DF	MEX	Jorge Valencia (on loan from UANL)
—	DF	MEX	Francisco Vidal (on loan from Toluca, previously on loan at La Piedad)
—	MF	MEX	Diego de la Torre (on loan from Toluca)
—	MF	MEX	Jonathan de León (from UANL, previously on loan at (United States) Los Angeles Blues)
—	MF	URU	Diego Guastavino (from (Norway) Brann)
—	MF	MEX	Gonzalo Pineda (on loan from Guadalajara, previously on loan at Puebla F.C.)
—	MF	MEX	Marvin Piñón (on loan from Monterrey, previously on loan at Correcaminos UAT)
—	FW	URU	Carlos Bueno (loan return from (Argentina) San Lorenzo)
—	FW	MEX	Juan Carlos Enríquez (on loan from Santos Laguna)
—	FW	MEX	Luis Ángel Landín (from Puebla)
—	FW	MEX	Isaac Romo (on loan from Puebla)
—	FW	MEX	Armando Pulido (on loan from UANL)
—	FW	URU	Diego Vera (from (Uruguay) Liverpool)

Out: Note: Flags indicate national team as defined under FIFA eligibility rules; some limited exceptions apply. Players may hold more than one non-FIFA nationality.

No.	Pos.	Nation	Player
1	GK	MEX	Liborio Sánchez (loan to Guadalajara)
16	DF	MEX	Sergio Amaury Ponce (loan return to Guadalajara)
24	MF	MEX	López (on loan to San Luis)
27	DF	MEX	Christian Pérez (loan return to Guadalajara)
—	MF	CHI	José Pérez (to (Chile) Cobreloa)

=== San Luis ===
In: Note: Flags indicate national team as defined under FIFA eligibility rules; some limited exceptions apply. Players may hold more than one non-FIFA nationality.

No.	Pos.	Nation	Player
—	DF	MEX	Félix Araujo (on loan from Toluca)
—	DF	COL	Andrés Cadavid (from (Colombia) Deportivo Cali)
—	DF	MEX	José Antonio Castro (on loan from UANL, previously on loan at Necaxa)
—	DF	MEX	Marco Iván Pérez (on loan from Pachuca, previously on loan at León)
—	DF	MEX	Guillermo Rojas (on loan from Chiapas, previously on loan at Atlas)
—	MF	BRA	Everton Bilher (from (Brazil) Clube de Regatas Brasil)
—	MF	MEX	López (on loan from Querétaro)
—	MF	MEX	Juan Carlos Silva (on loan from Pachuca, previously on loan at La Piedad)
—	MF	MEX	Moises Velasco (on loan from Toluca, previously on loan)
—	FW	MEX	Emmanuel Cerda (on loan from UANL)
—	FW	URU	Sebastián Fernández (from (Uruguay) Danubio F.C.)
—	FW	MEX	Luis Ángel Mendoza (on loan from UANL, previously on loan at La Piedad)
—	FW	COL	Santiago Tréllez (from (Colombia) Independiente Medellín)

Out: Note: Flags indicate national team as defined under FIFA eligibility rules; some limited exceptions apply. Players may hold more than one non-FIFA nationality.

No.	Pos.	Nation	Player
3	DF	MEX	Jesús Chávez (loan return to UANL)
4	DF	MEX	Christian Sánchez (loan return to Atlas)
7	MF	MEX	Ignacio Torres (to Atlante)
8	MF	MEX	Jehu Chiapas (loan return to UNAM)
15	MF	MEX	Fernando Morales (loan return to UNAM)
17	DF	MEX	Daniel Alcántar (on loan to Querétaro)
23	FW	ARG	Alfredo Moreno (to Tijuana)
––	DF	PAR	Pablo Aguilar (on loan to Tijuana, previously on loan at (Paraguay) Sportivo Luqueño)
—	DF	ARG	Anibal Matellán (to (Argentina) Argentinos Juniors)
––	DF	MEX	Óscar Mascorro (on loan to León, previously on loan)
––	DF	MEX	Leonel Olmedo (on loan to Querétaro, previously on loan at Veracruz)
––	FW	MEX	Dieter Vargas (to UANL)

=== Santos Laguna ===
In: Note: Flags indicate national team as defined under FIFA eligibility rules; some limited exceptions apply. Players may hold more than one non-FIFA nationality.

No.	Pos.	Nation	Player
2	DF	MEX	Oswaldo Alanís (from Estudiantes Tecos)
7	MF	MEX	Edgar Gerardo Lugo (from Morelia)
—	FW	MEX	Walter Sandoval (from Estudiantes Tecos)

Out: Note: Flags indicate national team as defined under FIFA eligibility rules; some limited exceptions apply. Players may hold more than one non-FIFA nationality.

No.	Pos.	Nation	Player
9	FW	MEX	Carlos Ochoa (on loan to Morelia)
15	MF	MEX	Jaime Toledo (on loan to Veracruz)
28	MF	MEX	Carlos Adrián Morales (to Morelia)
––	DF	MEX	Uriel Álvarez (on loan to Morelia, previously on loan at Veracruz)
—	DF	URU	Jonathan Lacerda (loan to Necaxa, previously on loan at Puebla)
––	DF	MEX	Juan Pablo Santiago (to Tijuana, previously on loan)
––	MF	MEX	Francisco Torres (on loan to Morelia, previously on loan at Atlas)
––	FW	MEX	Juan Carlos Enríquez (on loan to Querétaro)

=== Tijuana ===
In: Note: Flags indicate national team as defined under FIFA eligibility rules; some limited exceptions apply. Players may hold more than one non-FIFA nationality.

No.	Pos.	Nation	Player
4	DF	MEX	Miguel Almazán (on loan from Toluca, previously on loan)
—	DF	USA	Edgar Castillo (from América, previously on loan)
—	DF	MEX	Juan Carlos Núñez (from Toluca, previously on loan)
—	DF	MEX	Juan Pablo Santiago (from Santos Laguna, previously on loan)
—	DF	PAR	Pablo Aguilar (on loan from San Luis, previously on loan at (Paraguay) Sportivo Luqueño)
—	MF	MEX	Luis Ángel García (from UANL, previously on loan at Veracruz)
—	MF	MEX	Jorge Hernández (on loan from Atlante)
—	MF	ECU	Fidel Martínez (from (Ecuador) Deportivo Quito)
—	MF	ARG	Diego Olsina (from Correcaminos UAT)
—	MF	ARG	Cristian Pellerano (from (Argentina) Independiente)
—	FW	ARG	Alfredo Moreno (on loan from San Luis)
—	FW	MEX	Raúl Nava (on loan from Toluca)

Out: Note: Flags indicate national team as defined under FIFA eligibility rules; some limited exceptions apply. Players may hold more than one non-FIFA nationality.

No.	Pos.	Nation	Player
29	FW	MEX	Armando Pulido (loan return to UANL)
—	MF	URU	Egidio Arévalo (to (Italy) Palermo)
—	FW	ARG	Leandro Fernández (loan return to (Argentina) Defensa y Justicia)
—	FW	ARG	José Sand (to (Argentina) Racing de Avellaneda)

=== Toluca ===
In: Note: Flags indicate national team as defined under FIFA eligibility rules; some limited exceptions apply. Players may hold more than one non-FIFA nationality.

No.	Pos.	Nation	Player
7	DF	MEX	Marvin Cabrera (on loan from Morelia)
20	MF	MEX	Jesús Paganoni (on loan from Atlas)
6	MF	MEX	Carlos Gerardo Rodríguez (from Pachuca)
8	MF	BRA	Lucas Silva (from Sinaloa, previously on loan at Puebla)
5	MF	BRA	Wilson Tiago (from (Brazil) Internacional)
23	FW	PAR	Édgar Benítez (on loan from Pachuca, previously on loan at (Paraguay) Cerro Porteño)
19	FW	MEX	Edy Brambila (from Pachuca)
––	FW	PAN	Luis Tejada (from (Peru) Juan Aurich)

Out: Note: Flags indicate national team as defined under FIFA eligibility rules; some limited exceptions apply. Players may hold more than one non-FIFA nationality.

No.	Pos.	Nation	Player
5	MF	ARG	Martín Romagnoli (on loan to UNAM)
7	MF	MEX	Néstor Calderón (to Pachuca)
8	MF	MEX	Diego de la Torre (on loan to Querétaro)
19	FW	MEX	Raúl Nava (on loan to Tijuana)
20	DF	PAR	Aureliano Torres (to (Uruguay) Peñarol)
29	MF	URU	Gonzalo Porras (loan return to (Uruguay) River Plate de Montevideo)
22	DF	MEX	Felix Araujo (on loan to San Luis)
––	DF	MEX	Miguel Almazán (on loan to Tijuana, previously on loan)
––	DF	MEX	Juan Carlos Núñez (to Tijuana, previously on loan)
––	DF	MEX	Francisco Vidal (on loan to Querétaro, previously on loan at La Piedad)
––	MF	MEX	Juan José Calderón (on loan to León)
––	FW	MEX	Moises Velasco (on loan to San Luis, previously on loan)

=== UANL ===
In: Note: Flags indicate national team as defined under FIFA eligibility rules; some limited exceptions apply. Players may hold more than one non-FIFA nationality.

No.	Pos.	Nation	Player
—	DF	MEX	Alonso Zamora (from Atlas)
—	FW	ESP	Luis García Fernández (on loan from (Spain) Real Zaragoza)
—	FW	MEX	Taufic Guarch (on loan from Estudiantes Tecos, previously on loan at (Spain) Espanyol B)
—	FW	GUA	Henry López (from (Brazil) EC Noroeste)
—	FW	MEX	Dieter Vargas (from San Luis)

Out: Note: Flags indicate national team as defined under FIFA eligibility rules; some limited exceptions apply. Players may hold more than one non-FIFA nationality.

No.	Pos.	Nation	Player
9	FW	CHI	Héctor Mancilla (to Atlas)
22	MF	MEX	Édgar Pacheco (on loan to León)
23	DF	MEX	Lampros Kontogiannis (loan return to America)
––	DF	MEX	José Antonio Castro (on loan to San Luis, previously on loan at Necaxa)
––	DF	MEX	Jesús Chávez (on loan to Puebla, previously on loan at San Luis)
––	DF	MEX	Jorge Valencia (on loan to Querétaro)
––	MF	PAN	Manuel Asprilla (on loan to (Panama) Tauro)
––	MF	MEX	Jonathan de León (to Querétaro, previously on loan at (United States) Los Angeles Blues)
––	MF	MEX	Luis Ángel García (to Tijuana, previously on loan at Veracruz)
––	FW	MEX	Emmanuel Cerda (on loan to San Luis)
––	FW	MEX	Luis Ángel Mendoza (on loan to San Luis, previously on loan at La Piedad)
––	FW	MEX	Armando Pulido (on loan to Querétaro)

=== UNAM ===
In: Note: Flags indicate national team as defined under FIFA eligibility rules; some limited exceptions apply. Players may hold more than one non-FIFA nationality.

No.	Pos.	Nation	Player
6	MF	MEX	Jehu Chiapas (loan return from San Luis)
21	MF	MEX	Jaime Lozano (from Cruz Azul, previously on loan at Morelia)
—	MF	MEX	Fernando Morales (loan return from San Luis)
5	MF	ARG	Martín Romagnoli (on loan from Toluca)
14	MF	ESP	Luis García (from Puebla)
9	FW	ARG	Emmanuel Villa (from Cruz Azul)

Out: Note: Flags indicate national team as defined under FIFA eligibility rules; some limited exceptions apply. Players may hold more than one non-FIFA nationality.

No.	Pos.	Nation	Player
5	MF	MEX	Diego de Buen (on loan to Puebla)
24	FW	MEX	Juan Carlos Cacho (to Toluca)
––	MF	MEX	Óscar Rojas (on loan to Atlante, previously on loan)

== See also ==
- 2012–13 Liga MX season
