= List of Mexican football transfers winter 2011–12 =

This is a list of Mexican football transfers in the Mexican Primera Division during the winter 2011–12 transfer window, grouped by club.

== Mexican Primera Division ==
=== América ===
In: Note: Flags indicate national team as defined under FIFA eligibility rules; some limited exceptions apply. Players may hold more than one non-FIFA nationality.

No.	Pos.	Nation	Player
2	DF	VEN	Oswaldo Vizcarrondo (from (Argentina) Olimpo)
16	MF	MEX	José María Cárdenas (from Santos Laguna)
18	MF	MEX	Christian Bermúdez (from Atlante)
23	GK	MEX	Moisés Muñoz (from Atlante)
53	MF	MEX	Gil Cordero (from Veracruz)

Out: Note: Flags indicate national team as defined under FIFA eligibility rules; some limited exceptions apply. Players may hold more than one non-FIFA nationality.

No.	Pos.	Nation	Player
1	GK	MEX	Armando Navarrete (on loan to Atlante)
8	FW	URU	Vicente Sánchez (to (Uruguay) Nacional)
15	DF	USA	Edgar Castillo (on loan to Tijuana)
16	FW	USA	Isaac Acuña (on loan to Mérida)
18	FW	MEX	Ángel Reyna (to Monterrey)
20	GK	MEX	Leonín Pineda (on loan to La Piedad)
23	MF	MEX	José Joaquín Martínez (on loan to Necaxa)
34	DF	MEX	George Corral (on loan to Chiapas)

=== Atlante ===
In: Note: Flags indicate national team as defined under FIFA eligibility rules; some limited exceptions apply. Players may hold more than one non-FIFA nationality.

No.	Pos.	Nation	Player
18	MF	ARG	Juan Cuevas (from Toluca, previously on loan)
30	GK	MEX	Armando Navarrete (on loan from América)
19	DF	MEX	Ricardo Jimenez (from Atlas)
2	DF	ECU	Jorge Guagua (from (Ecuador) LDU Quito)
10	MF	ECU	Michael Arroyo (from San Luis)
--	MF	ECU	David Quiroz (from (Ecuador) Emelec)
9	FW	PER	Andrés Mendoza (from (United States) Columbus Crew)
20	FW	MEX	Hebert Alférez (on loan from Atlas, previously on loan at (Croatia) HNK Rijeka)

Out: Note: Flags indicate national team as defined under FIFA eligibility rules; some limited exceptions apply. Players may hold more than one non-FIFA nationality.

No.	Pos.	Nation	Player
5	DF	ARG	Nicolás Torres (released)
9	FW	VEN	Giancarlo Maldonado (to Atlas)
10	MF	MEX	Christian Bermúdez (to América)
19	DF	MEX	Diego Ordaz (to San Luis)
23	GK	MEX	Moisés Muñoz (to América)
33	MF	ARG	Matías Córdoba (to (Chile) Antofagasta)
--	GK	MEX	Gerardo Ruiz (to Chiapas, previously on loan)
--	MF	ECU	David Quiroz (on loan to (Ecuador) Liga de Quito)
--	FW	MEX	Luis Ángel Landín (unregistered, to Puebla)

=== Atlas ===
In: Note: Flags indicate national team as defined under FIFA eligibility rules; some limited exceptions apply. Players may hold more than one non-FIFA nationality.

No.	Pos.	Nation	Player
1	GK	CHI	Miguel Pinto (from Universidad de Chile, previously on loan)
5	DF	ARG	Facundo Erpen (from (Argentina) Instituto)
8	MF	MEX	Lucas Ayala (from UANL, previously on loan)
9	FW	VEN	Giancarlo Maldonado (from Atlante)
11	FW	MEX	Sergio Santana (from Monterrey)
15	DF	MEX	Rogelio Chávez (on loan from Pachuca)
26	MF	MEX	Carlos Gutiérrez (from (Croatia) HNK Rijeka, previously on loan)
13	GK	MEX	Jorge Villalpando (from Toluca)
17	MF	ARG	Jorge Zamogilny (from Tecos)
24	DF	ARG	Leandro Cufré (from (Croatia) Dinamo Zagreb)

Out: Note: Flags indicate national team as defined under FIFA eligibility rules; some limited exceptions apply. Players may hold more than one non-FIFA nationality.

No.	Pos.	Nation	Player
2	DF	MEX	Ricardo Jimenez (to Atlante)
3	DF	MEX	Néstor Vidrio (on loan to Pachuca)
4	DF	MEX	Luis Enrique Robles (to Veracruz)
5	DF	URU	Jonathan Lacerda (to Puebla)
11	FW	URU	Gastón Puerari (released)
12	DF	MEX	Daniel Arreola (loan return to Pachuca)
17	FW	HON	Georgie Welcome (released)
24	GK	MEX	José Francisco Canales (released)
31	MF	MEX	Jonathan Piña (on loan to La Piedad)
--	DF	COL	Wilman Conde (unregistered, to (United States) New York Red Bulls)
--	MF	MEX	Gregorio Torres (on loan to (South Korea) Daejeon Citizen)
--	FW	MEX	Hebert Alférez (on loan to Atlante, previously on loan at (Croatia) HNK Rijeka)

=== Chiapas ===
In: Note: Flags indicate national team as defined under FIFA eligibility rules; some limited exceptions apply. Players may hold more than one non-FIFA nationality.

No.	Pos.	Nation	Player
7	MF	MEX	Luis Miguel Noriega (on loan from Morelia)
8	DF	MEX	George Corral (on loan from América)
16	GK	MEX	Gerardo Ruiz (from Atlante, previously on loan)
21	MF	MEX	Yasser Corona (on loan from Morelia)
--	MF	MEX	Hiber Ruíz (from Querétaro)

Out: Note: Flags indicate national team as defined under FIFA eligibility rules; some limited exceptions apply. Players may hold more than one non-FIFA nationality.

No.	Pos.	Nation	Player
7	DF	MEX	Óscar Razo (on loan to Morelia)
8	DF	MEX	Orlando Rincón (on loan to Mérida)
26	MF	MEX	Christian Valdéz (on loan to Morelia)
--	DF	MEX	Jesús Chávez (loan return to UANL)

=== Cruz Azul ===
In: Note: Flags indicate national team as defined under FIFA eligibility rules; some limited exceptions apply. Players may hold more than one non-FIFA nationality.

No.	Pos.	Nation	Player
19	FW	MEX	Omar Bravo (from (United States) Sporting Kansas City)
18	MF	BRA	Francinilson Meirelles (from (Brazil) Esporte Clube Bahia)

Out: Note: Flags indicate national team as defined under FIFA eligibility rules; some limited exceptions apply. Players may hold more than one non-FIFA nationality.

No.	Pos.	Nation	Player
5	DF	MEX	Alejandro Castro (on loan to Tecos)
18	MF	MEX	César Villaluz (to San Luis)
19	MF	CHI	Hugo Droguett (released)
13	MF	MEX	Allam Bello (on loan to Neza)

=== Guadalajara ===
In: Note: Flags indicate national team as defined under FIFA eligibility rules; some limited exceptions apply. Players may hold more than one non-FIFA nationality.

No.	Pos.	Nation	Player
3	DF	MEX	Dionicio Escalante (loan return from Pachuca)
--	MF	MEX	Abraham Coronado (loan return from Irapuato)

Out: Note: Flags indicate national team as defined under FIFA eligibility rules; some limited exceptions apply. Players may hold more than one non-FIFA nationality.

No.	Pos.	Nation	Player
3	DF	MEX	Arturo Ledesma (on loan to Pachuca)
30	MF	MEX	Edgar Solis (on loan to Tecos)
98	MF	MEX	José Tostado (to UANL)
--	FW	MEX	Adolfo Bautista (released, previously on loan at Querétaro)
--	FW	MEX	Michel Vázquez (on loan to Tecos, previously on loan at Querétaro)

=== Monterrey ===
In: Note: Flags indicate national team as defined under FIFA eligibility rules; some limited exceptions apply. Players may hold more than one non-FIFA nationality.

No.	Pos.	Nation	Player
7	FW	MEX	Othoniel Arce (from San Luis)
10	FW	MEX	Ángel Reyna (from América)

Out: Note: Flags indicate national team as defined under FIFA eligibility rules; some limited exceptions apply. Players may hold more than one non-FIFA nationality.

No.	Pos.	Nation	Player
11	FW	MEX	Sergio Santana (to Atlas)
16	DF	MEX	Luis Alfonso Rodríguez (on loan to San Luis)
22	DF	MEX	William Paredes (to San Luis)
33	MF	MEX	Marvin Piñón (on loan to Correcaminos)
--	DF	MEX	Diego Ordaz (to San Luis, previously on loan at Atlante)

=== Morelia ===
In: Note: Flags indicate national team as defined under FIFA eligibility rules; some limited exceptions apply. Players may hold more than one non-FIFA nationality.

No.	Pos.	Nation	Player
19	DF	MEX	Óscar Razo (on loan from Chiapas)
26	MF	MEX	Christian Valdéz (on loan from Chiapas)
22	MF	MEX	Diego Mejía (from Toros Neza)
48	FW	MEX	Víctor Guajardo (from Toros Neza)
14	FW	COL	Edison Toloza (on loan from (Colombia) Millonarios)

Out: Note: Flags indicate national team as defined under FIFA eligibility rules; some limited exceptions apply. Players may hold more than one non-FIFA nationality.

No.	Pos.	Nation	Player
14	MF	MEX	Luis Miguel Noriega (on loan to Chiapas)
17	MF	MEX	Yasser Corona (on loan to Chiapas)
19	MF	MEX	Manuel Pérez (released)
22	DF	MEX	Diego Jiménez (released)

=== Pachuca ===
In: Note: Flags indicate national team as defined under FIFA eligibility rules; some limited exceptions apply. Players may hold more than one non-FIFA nationality.

No.	Pos.	Nation	Player
3	DF	MEX	Néstor Vidrio (on loan from Atlas)
4	DF	MEX	Arturo Ledesma (on loan from Guadalajara)
13	GK	MEX	Alfonso Blanco (loan return from León)
15	DF	MEX	Daniel Arreola (loan return from Atlas)
20	FW	MEX	Guillermo Franco (from (Argentina) Vélez)

Out: Note: Flags indicate national team as defined under FIFA eligibility rules; some limited exceptions apply. Players may hold more than one non-FIFA nationality.

No.	Pos.	Nation	Player
1	GK	COL	Miguel Calero (retired)
3	DF	MEX	Dionicio Escalante (loan return to Guadalajara)
4	DF	MEX	Marco Pérez (on loan to León)
7	MF	MEX	Elías Hernández (to UANL)
15	MF	MEX	Juan Carlos Silva (on loan to La Piedad)
24	MF	MEX	Raúl Martínez (on loan to León)
28	DF	MEX	Rogelio Chávez (on loan to Atlas)
110	MF	COL	Andrés Chitiva (retired)

=== Puebla ===
In: Note: Flags indicate national team as defined under FIFA eligibility rules; some limited exceptions apply. Players may hold more than one non-FIFA nationality.

No.	Pos.	Nation	Player
10	DF	URU	Jonathan Lacerda (on loan from Santos Laguna, previously on loan at Atlas)
13	FW	MEX	Luis Ángel Landín (from Atlante)
--	FW	MEX	Kevin Zapata (on loan from Mérida)
12	FW	ECU	Armando Wila (on loan from (Ecuador) Barcelona)

Out: Note: Flags indicate national team as defined under FIFA eligibility rules; some limited exceptions apply. Players may hold more than one non-FIFA nationality.

No.	Pos.	Nation	Player
10	MF	ARG	Gabriel Pereyra (on loan to Tecos)
13	FW	MEX	Isaac Romo (loan return to Querétaro)
15	DF	MEX	Uriel Álvarez (loan return to Santos Laguna)
20	FW	COL	Duvier Riascos (to Tijuana)

=== Querétaro ===
In: Note: Flags indicate national team as defined under FIFA eligibility rules; some limited exceptions apply. Players may hold more than one non-FIFA nationality.

No.	Pos.	Nation	Player
9	FW	MEX	Isaac Romo (loan return from Puebla)
17	MF	CHI	José Pérez (on loan from (Chile) Huachipato)
10	MF	ARG	Pablo Vitti (from (Peru) Universitario)
20	FW	ARG	Germán Alemanno (from (Peru) Universidad de San Martín)

Out: Note: Flags indicate national team as defined under FIFA eligibility rules; some limited exceptions apply. Players may hold more than one non-FIFA nationality.

No.	Pos.	Nation	Player
7	FW	MEX	Adolfo Bautista (loan return to Guadalajara)
9	FW	MEX	Michel Vázquez (to Tecos)
13	DF	MEX	Alvin Mendoza (to Altamira)
17	MF	MEX	Hiber Ruíz (to Chiapas)
18	FW	MEX	Pablo Bonells (to Celaya)
20	FW	URU	Carlos Bueno (to (Argentina) San Lorenzo)
22	FW	ARG	Franco Niell (to (Brazil) Figueirense)

=== San Luis ===
In: Note: Flags indicate national team as defined under FIFA eligibility rules; some limited exceptions apply. Players may hold more than one non-FIFA nationality.

No.	Pos.	Nation	Player
26	DF	MEX	William Paredes (from Monterrey)
27	DF	MEX	Diego Ordaz (from Monterrey, previously on loan at Atlante)
--	DF	MEX	Luis Alfonso Rodríguez (on loan from Monterrey)
3	DF	MEX	Jesús Chávez (on loan from UANL, previously on loan at Chiapas)
14	MF	MEX	César Villaluz (from Cruz Azul)
11	FW	ARG	Facundo Pereyra (from (Chile) Audax Italiano)

Out: Note: Flags indicate national team as defined under FIFA eligibility rules; some limited exceptions apply. Players may hold more than one non-FIFA nationality.

No.	Pos.	Nation	Player
9	MF	ECU	Michael Arroyo (to Atlante)
11	MF	COL	Macnelly Torres (to (Colombia) Atlético Nacional)
27	FW	MEX	Othoniel Arce (to Monterrey)

=== Santos Laguna ===
In: Note: Flags indicate national team as defined under FIFA eligibility rules; some limited exceptions apply. Players may hold more than one non-FIFA nationality.

No.	Pos.	Nation	Player
16	FW	USA	Herculez Gomez (from Tecos)
6	MF	ESP	Marc Crosas (from (Russia) Volga Nizhny Novgorod)

Out: Note: Flags indicate national team as defined under FIFA eligibility rules; some limited exceptions apply. Players may hold more than one non-FIFA nationality.

No.	Pos.	Nation	Player
7	MF	MEX	José María Cárdenas (to América)
--	DF	MEX	Uriel Álvarez (on loan to Veracruz previously on loan to Puebla)
80	DF	URU	Jonathan Lacerda (on loan to Puebla, previously on loan at Atlas)
--	MF	ECU	Pedro Quiñónez (to (Ecuador) Emelec, previously on loan)

=== Tecos ===
In: Note: Flags indicate national team as defined under FIFA eligibility rules; some limited exceptions apply. Players may hold more than one non-FIFA nationality.

No.	Pos.	Nation	Player
6	DF	MEX	Alejandro Castro (on loan from Cruz Azul)
18	DF	MEX	José Antonio Castro (on loan from Tigres de la UANL, previously on loan at Necaxa)
16	MF	MEX	Gerardo Galindo (on loan from Necaxa)
17	MF	MEX	Edgar Solis (on loan from Guadalajara)
30	MF	ARG	Fernando Gutiérrez (from (Argentina) San Lorenzo)
19	MF	ARG	Gabriel Pereyra (on loan from Puebla)
29	FW	MEX	Michel Vázquez (on loan from Guadalajara, previously on loan at Querétaro)
24	FW	PAR	Fredy Bareiro (loan return from (Paraguay) Cerro Porteño)

Out: Note: Flags indicate national team as defined under FIFA eligibility rules; some limited exceptions apply. Players may hold more than one non-FIFA nationality.

No.	Pos.	Nation	Player
6	MF	MEX	Rafael Medina (to Veracruz)
13	DF	MEX	Melvin Brown (on loan to Cruz Azul Hidalgo)
16	FW	USA	Herculez Gomez (to Santos Laguna)
18	MF	ARG	Jorge Zamogilny (to Atlas)
24	DF	ARG	Lucas Bovaglio (to (Argentina) Atlético Rafaela)
25	MF	MEX	José Ramón Partida (on loan to Sinaloa)
30	MF	CHI	Nelson Pinto (released)

=== Tijuana ===
In: Note: Flags indicate national team as defined under FIFA eligibility rules; some limited exceptions apply. Players may hold more than one non-FIFA nationality.

No.	Pos.	Nation	Player
2	DF	USA	Edgar Castillo (on loan from América)
11	FW	COL	Duvier Riascos (from Puebla)
24	DF	USA	Greg Garza (from (Portugal) Estoril Praia)
26	DF	MEX	Alfredo González Tahuilán (on loan from UANL, previously on loan at Atlas)

Out: Note: Flags indicate national team as defined under FIFA eligibility rules; some limited exceptions apply. Players may hold more than one non-FIFA nationality.

No.	Pos.	Nation	Player
11	FW	MEX	Luis Orozco (to La Piedad)
24	MF	ARG	Javier Yacuzzi (to Huracán)
25	GK	MEX	Humberto Martínez (loan return to Correcaminos UAT)
26	MF	MEX	Felix Ángel Ayala (released)
28	MF	MEX	Fernando Santana (released)

=== Toluca ===
In: Note: Flags indicate national team as defined under FIFA eligibility rules; some limited exceptions apply. Players may hold more than one non-FIFA nationality.

No.	Pos.	Nation	Player
29	MF	URU	Gonzalo Porras (on loan from (Uruguay) River Plate de Montevideo, previously on loan at (Uruguay) Danubio)

Out: Note: Flags indicate national team as defined under FIFA eligibility rules; some limited exceptions apply. Players may hold more than one non-FIFA nationality.

No.	Pos.	Nation	Player
3	GK	MEX	Jorge Villalpando (on loan to Atlas)
18	MF	ARG	Juan Cuevas (to Atlante, previously on loan)

=== UANL ===
In: Note: Flags indicate national team as defined under FIFA eligibility rules; some limited exceptions apply. Players may hold more than one non-FIFA nationality.

No.	Pos.	Nation	Player
10	MF	MEX	Elías Hernández (from Pachuca)
26	MF	BRA	Edno (from (Brazil) Corinthians, previously on loan to (Brazil) Portuguesa)
--	MF	MEX	José Tostado (from Guadalajara)

Out: Note: Flags indicate national team as defined under FIFA eligibility rules; some limited exceptions apply. Players may hold more than one non-FIFA nationality.

No.	Pos.	Nation	Player
10	MF	BRA	Danilinho (on loan to (Brazil) Atlético Mineiro)
--	DF	MEX	José Antonio Castro (on loan to Estudiantes Tecos, previously on loan at Necaxa)
--	DF	MEX	Jesús Chávez (on loan to San Luis, previously on loan at Chiapas)
--	DF	MEX	Alfredo González Tahuilán (on loan to Tijuana, previously on loan at Atlas)
--	MF	BRA	Éverton Cardoso (on loan to (South Korea) Suwon Bluewings, previously on loan to (Brazil) Botafogo)
--	MF	MEX	Lucas Ayala (to Atlas, previously on loan)
--	FW	ISR	Orr Barouch (to (United States) Chicago Fire, previously on loan)

=== UNAM ===
In: Note: Flags indicate national team as defined under FIFA eligibility rules; some limited exceptions apply. Players may hold more than one non-FIFA nationality.

No.	Pos.	Nation	Player

Out: Note: Flags indicate national team as defined under FIFA eligibility rules; some limited exceptions apply. Players may hold more than one non-FIFA nationality.

No.	Pos.	Nation	Player
17	FW	MEX	Francisco Palencia (retired)

== See also ==
- 2011–12 Primera División de México season
