= Francisco Franco (disambiguation) =

Francisco Franco (1892–1975) was a Spanish Head of State and Prime Minister.

Francisco Franco may also refer to:

- Francisco Franco National Foundation, Spanish foundation and propaganda hub
- Equestrian statue of Francisco Franco, bronze statue in Madrid, Spain
- Statue of Francisco Franco, Melilla, statue in Melilla, Spain
- Generalissimo Francisco Franco is still dead, catchphrase from NBC's Saturday Night
- Francisco Franco del Amo (1960–2021), Spanish academic and author
- Francisco Franco Salgado-Araújo (1890–1975), Spanish soldier, cousin of the dictator
- Francisco Franco (footballer) (born 1987), Mexican footballer

== See also ==
- Francis Franco (born 1954), Spanish aristocrat, businessman and poacher and grandson of the former head of state
- Francisco Di Franco (born 1995), Argentine footballer
