= Tomás Charles =

Argentine footballer (born 1985)

Personal information
- Full name: Tomás Patricio Charles
- Date of birth: 12 June 1985 (age 41)
- Place of birth: Buenos Aires, Argentina
- Height: 1.84 m (6 ft 0 in)
- Position: Centre-back

Youth career
- Independiente

Senior career*
| Years | Team | Apps | (Gls) |
| 2004–2006 | Independiente | 15 | (0) |
| 2007–2008 | Nyíregyháza | 27 | (1) |
| 2008–2009 | Instituto | 24 | (0) |
| 2010 | Racing de Montevideo | 6 | (0) |
| 2011 | La Piedad | 7 | (0) |
| 2011–2013 | Mérida | 46 | (1) |
| 2013 | Cafetaleros de Tapachula | 9 | (2) |
| 2014 | Almagro | 18 | (1) |
| 2014–2015 | Unión La Calera | 31 | (4) |
| 2015–2017 | Deportes Iquique | 62 | (3) |
| 2018 | Boca Unidos | 10 | (1) |
| 2018 | Deportes Temuco | 0 | (0) |
| 2019 | Boca Unidos | 10 | (1) |
| 2019–2020 | Argentino de Quilmes | 6 | (0) |
- * Club domestic league appearances and goals

Tomás Patricio Charles (born 12 June 1985) is a retired Argentine footballer.
