= Francisco Pizano =

Mexican footballer (born 1987)

Personal information
- Full name: Francisco Pizano Vera
- Date of birth: 17 January 1987 (age 39)
- Place of birth: Salvatierra, Guanajuato, Mexico
- Height: 1.85 m (6 ft 1 in)
- Position: Defender

Senior career*
Years	Team	Apps	(Gls)
2007–2011	León	7	(0)
2009–2010	→ Tijuana (loan)	12	(0)
2011–2014	Puebla	1	(0)
2013	→ UdeG (loan)	2	(0)
2014	→ Celaya (loan)	6	(0)
- * Club domestic league appearances and goals

Francisco Pizano Vera (born 17 August 1987) is a Mexican former footballer.

== Career ==
He began his career 2007 with León that same year he made his professional debut against Salamanca. In 2009, he signed with Tijuana where he only spent one year before returning to León for the 2010-2011 tournament. On 9 June 2011, he was signed by Primera División (First Division) club Puebla.
