= Roberto Ruiz Esparza Jr. =

Mexican footballer (born 1992)

Personal information
- Full name: Roberto Ruiz Esparza del Cerro
- Date of birth: 14 April 1992 (age 34)
- Place of birth: Puebla, Mexico
- Height: 1.80 m (5 ft 11 in)
- Position: Forward

Senior career*
Years	Team	Apps	(Gls)
2009–2012	Lobos de la BUAP	17	(1)
2012	Puebla	0	(0)
2013	Mérida	5	(0)
- * Club domestic league appearances and goals as of 31 March 2013

Roberto Ruiz Esparza del Cerro Jr. (born 14 April 1992) is a former professional footballer, who last played as a forward for Merida in the Ascenso MX.

== Professional career ==
Roberto Ruiz Esparza Jr. was born in Puebla, Puebla, Mexico on 14 May 1992 to former football player Roberto Ruiz Esparza. He spent most of his teen years in the Lobos de la BUAP mainly in the second division club Lobos Prepa, and joining Liga de Ascenso in 2009. In 2012, he was transferred to the first division club Puebla FC.
