= Dieter Vargas =

Mexican footballer (born 1993)

Personal information
- Full name: Dieter Eduardo Vargas Guzmán
- Date of birth: 27 May 1993 (age 33)
- Place of birth: San Luis Potosí, Mexico
- Height: 1.85 m (6 ft 1 in)
- Position: Centre-back

Youth career
- 2009–2012: San Luis
- 2012–2013: Tigres UANL

Senior career*
Years	Team	Apps	(Gls)
2013–2014	Tigres UANL	0	(0)
2014	→ Atlético San Luis (loan)	0	(0)
2015–2016	Tampico Madero	39	(4)
2016–2017	Oaxaca	14	(1)
2017–2019	Potros UAEM	57	(1)
2020	Saltillo F.C.	10	(0)
2020	Industriales Naucalpan F.C.	0	(0)
2021	Once Deportivo	44	(2)
2022	Chalatenango	15	(2)
- * Club domestic league appearances and goals as of 12 June 2022

Dieter Eduardo Vargas Guzmán (born 27 May 1993) is a Mexican professional footballer who plays as a centre-back for Salvadoran club Chalatenango.
