= Juan Fernández (footballer, born 1989) =

Mexican footballer

Personal information
- Full name: Juan Fernando Fernández Méndez
- Date of birth: 20 June 1989 (age 37)
- Place of birth: Salamanca, Mexico
- Height: 1.65 m (5 ft 5 in)
- Position: Defender

Senior career*
Years	Team	Apps	(Gls)
2010–2011	Cruz Azul Hidalgo	9	(0)
2012–2016	Celaya	60	(2)
2016–2017	Veracruz	2	(0)
2017	Celaya	0	(0)
Total		71	(2)
- * Club domestic league appearances and goals

Juan Fernando Fernández Méndez (born 20 June 1989) is a Mexican former professional footballer.
