= Brayan Martínez =

Mexican footballer (born 1990)

Personal information
- Full name: Brayan Adán Martínez Arizpe
- Date of birth: 22 January 1990 (age 36)
- Place of birth: Puebla, Mexico
- Height: 1.69 m (5 ft 7 in)
- Positions: Striker; winger

Youth career
- 2007–2010: Monterrey

Senior career*
| Years | Team | Apps | (Gls) |
| 2010–2011 | Monterrey | 0 | (0) |
| 2011–2015 | Puebla | 45 | (0) |
| 2014–2015 | → Venados (loan) | 13 | (0) |
| 2015 | → Zacatepec (loan) | 0 | (0) |
| 2016–2017 | Murciélagos | 44 | (5) |
| 2018 | Xelajú MC | 15 | (1) |
| 2018–2019 | Monterrey Flash (indoor) | 7 | (1) |
- * Club domestic league appearances and goals as of 26 March 2019

Brayan Adan Martinez (born 22 January 1990) is a Mexican football player who plays for the Monterrey Flash as a striker or winger.

== Career ==
He plays for Puebla in the Primera División de México. He joined Monterrey youth squad in 2006 where, after playing in the under 20 youth reserve, he was called up to play his first professional game in the 2009–10 Copa Libertadores, although never having played in any league games. In 2010, he was called up, this time to take part of the 2010–2011 CONCACAF Champions League. In 2011, he was loaned to Puebla FC where he finally made his Primera División debut on 9 January, against Chivas.
