= William Paredes =

Mexican footballer (born 1985)

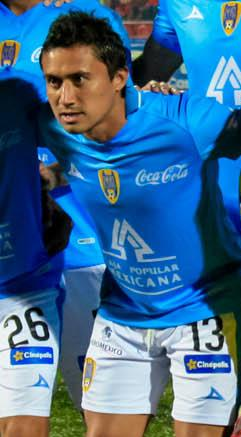
- Paredes with San Luis FC

Personal information
- Full name: William Alberto Paredes Barbudo
- Date of birth: 9 September 1985 (age 41)
- Place of birth: Mérida, Yucatán, Mexico
- Height: 1.63 m (5 ft 4 in)
- Positions: Left winger; left back

Senior career*
Years	Team	Apps	(Gls)
2006–2011	Monterrey	119	(3)
2012–2013	San Luis FC	27	(0)
2013	Puebla	14	(0)
2013–2017	Chiapas	66	(0)

International career
2008	Mexico	1	(0)
- * Club domestic league appearances and goals

William Alberto Paredes Barbudo (Note: In this Spanish name, the first or paternal surname is Paredes and the second or maternal family name is Barbudo.) (born 9 September 1985) is a Mexican former professional footballer.

Paredes has earned one cap for Mexico, which came on September 24, 2008, in a 1–0 loss to Chile in Los Angeles.

== Honours ==
Monterrey

- Primera División de México: Apertura 2009, Apertura 2010
