= Marco Iván Pérez =

Mexican footballer (born 1987)

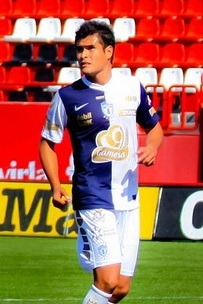
- Pérez playing for Pachuca in 2013

Personal information
- Full name: Marco Iván Pérez Riego
- Date of birth: 9 December 1987 (age 38)
- Place of birth: Mexico City, Mexico
- Height: 1.82 m (6 ft 0 in)
- Position: Defender

Senior career*
Years	Team	Apps	(Gls)
2006–2015	Pachuca	80	(3)
2012	→ León (loan)	1	(0)
2012–2013	→ San Luis (loan)	9	(2)
2015–2016	→ Mineros de Zacatecas (loan)	25	(0)
2016–2017	→ Lobos BUAP (loan)	14	(0)
2017–2018	Salmantino	0	(0)

International career
2007	Mexico U20	2	(0)
2007	Mexico U23	2	(0)
- * Club domestic league appearances and goals as of 16 November 2017

Marco Iván Pérez Riego (Note: In this Spanish name, the first or paternal surname is Pérez and the second or maternal family name is Riego.) (born 9 December 1987) is a Mexican former footballer, who last played as defender for CF Salmantino in the Spanish Primera División Regional Aficionados.

== Career ==
Pérez began his career with Indios de Ciudad Juárez, who at that time were Pachuca's filial team. He debuted with Indios on September 11, 2005, in a 3–0 loss to Lobos de la BUAP. A year later, he would find himself playing on the big stage with Pachuca, playing in the Apertura 2006 semifinal against Deportivo Toluca. He started and played all 90 minutes, as that night Pachuca wasn't able to count on 9 of their starters. The starting 11 was composed of 4 players from Indios, 4 substitutes, and only 3 starters. Pérez and his young teammates delivered, as Pachuca pulled off a 1–1 tie, even though they were later eliminated by Toluca.

Instead of being kept on the first team, Pachuca sent him to help their Segunda Division team, Pachuca Juniors earn promotion to the Primera Division A. The goal was reached, but was bittersweet at the end, as Pachuca Juniors was dissolved, only to be transplanted to Irapuato to become Irapuato FC.

He is used as a back-up defender for Pachuca, and was called up to occupy the roster spot of the injured Leobardo López during the final weeks of the Clausura 2009.

Pérez has also been capped at the Mexico U-20 level during the 2007 U-20 World Cup CONCACAF qualifying tournament in Culiacán, Sinaloa. Although he didn't make the U-20 World Cup final roster, he did make the first-team roster for Mexico during the 2007 Pan American Games.
