= Kevin Zapata =

Mexican footballer (born 1990)

Personal information
- Full name: Kevin Zapata Woodhouse
- Date of birth: May 22, 1990 (age 36)
- Place of birth: Mexico City, Mexico
- Height: 1.63 m (5 ft 4 in)
- Position: Forward

Youth career
- Atlante

Senior career*
Years	Team	Apps	(Gls)
2009–2010	Atlante UTN	10	(0)
2010–2012	Mérida	14	(1)
2011–2012	→ Puebla (loan)	0	(0)
2013	Atlante	0	(0)
- * Club domestic league appearances and goals as of 30 March 2013

Kevin Zapata Woodhouse (born May 22, 1990) is a Mexican footballer who played as forward. During his career he played for Atlante, Mérida and Puebla.
