= Efraín Dimayuga =

Mexican footballer (born 1989)

Personal information
- Full name: Efraín Dimayuga Lorenzo
- Date of birth: January 6, 1989 (age 37)
- Place of birth: Copala, Guerrero, Mexico
- Height: 1.72 m (5 ft 8 in)
- Position: Midfielder

Youth career
- 2007: Monarcas Morelia
- 2008: Mérida
- 2009: Chiapas

Senior career*
Years	Team	Apps	(Gls)
2009–2011	Chiapas	4	(0)
2011	→ Indios (loan)	13	(0)
2012–2013	Puebla	12	(0)
2013–2014	Club Necaxa	0	(0)
2013–2014	→ Lobos BUAP (loan)	10	(0)
2014–2015	Atlante	5	(0)
2016	Xelajú MC	7	(0)
2020	Acapulco	0	(0)
- * Club domestic league appearances and goals as of 3 November 2013

Efraín Dimayuga Lorenzo (born June 1, 1989) is a former Mexican professional football midfielder.
