= Emmanuel Cerda =

Mexican footballer (born 1987)

Personal information
- Full name: Emmanuel Cerda Martínez
- Date of birth: 27 January 1987 (age 39)
- Place of birth: San Luis Potosí, Mexico
- Height: 1.79 m (5 ft 10 in)
- Positions: Striker; winger

Senior career*
Years	Team	Apps	(Gls)
2006–2012	Tigres UANL	75	(7)
2009	→ Universitario (loan)	10	(4)
2010–2011	→ Deportivo Toluca (loan)	20	(5)
2012–2013	→ San Luis (loan)	9	(1)
2013	Puebla	4	(0)
2013	Tijuana	8	(0)
2014	→ Dorados (loan)	8	(0)
2015	Celaya	4	(0)
2016	Murciélagos	8	(0)
2016–2017	Potros UAEM	11	(0)
2020	Halcones de Zapopan	0	(0)

International career^{‡}
2007	Mexico	1	(0)
Medal record
Representing Mexico
Men's Football
Pan American Games
Bronze medal – third place	2007 Rio de Janeiro	Team competition
- * Club domestic league appearances and goals as of 7 February 2014 ‡ National team caps and goals as of 22 August 2007

Emmanuel Cerda Martínez (born 23 January 1987) is a former Mexican soccer striker who last played for Potros UAEM of the Ascenso MX.

== Club career ==
Cerda began playing football with Tigres de la UANL, and made his Primera debut, on his birthday, in the Clausura 2006 tournament against Tecos UAG. He scored his first goal in the 2–1 win in the Estadio Universitario. Cerda participated in 3 tournaments with Tigres, making 22 appearances and scoring six goals. Tigres sent him out on loan 3 times during his time with the club.

Universitario's manager Juan Reynoso, who knew of Cerda from when he was playing late in his career at Necaxa, took Cerda on loan in 2009. Cerda joined Toluca on loan for the Clausura 2011. He scored 3 goals and took Jaime Ayoví's starting spot at the end of the season.

=== International Caps ===
Updated 22 August 2007

International appearances
#	Date	Venue	Opponent	Result	Competition
1.	22 August 2007	Dick's Sporting Goods Park, Commerce City, United States	Colombia	0–1	Friendly

== Honours ==
=== Club ===
Universitario

- Primera División Peruana:
  - Winner (1): 2009

Tigres UANL

- Primera División de México:
  - Winner (1): Apertura 2011
