= Víctor Hugo Hernández =

Mexican footballer (born 1986)

Personal information
- Full name: Víctor Hugo Hernández
- Date of birth: 19 May 1986 (age 40)
- Place of birth: Zamora, Michoacán, Mexico
- Height: 1.83 m (6 ft 0 in)
- Position: Goalkeeper

Team information
- Current team: Guadalajara (goalkeeping coach)

Senior career*
Years	Team	Apps	(Gls)
2008–2017	Guadalajara	18	(0)
2012–2013	→ Puebla (loan)	22	(0)
2014–2015	→ Querétaro (loan)	3	(0)
2015	→ Necaxa (loan)	1	(0)
2016–2017	→ Coras (loan)	14	(0)
2017–2019	Atlético Zacatepec	55	(0)

Managerial career
- 2021–2022: Tapatío (goalkeeping coach)
- 2022–: Guadalajara (goalkeeping coach)
- * Club domestic league appearances and goals

Víctor Hugo Hernández (born 19 May 1986 in Zamora, Michoacán, Mexico) is a Mexican former professional footballer who last played as a goalkeeper for Atlético Zacatepec.
