= Armando Navarrete =

Mexican footballer (born 1980)

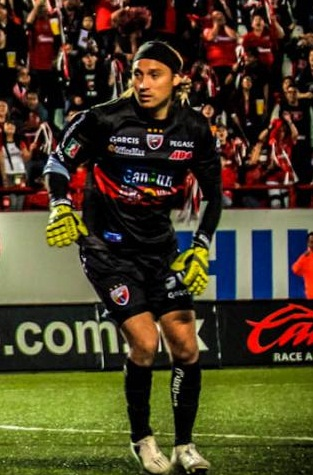
- Navarrete playing for Atlante

Personal information
- Full name: Armando Navarrete García
- Date of birth: 22 November 1980 (age 45)
- Place of birth: Jacona, Michoacán, Mexico
- Height: 1.81 m (5 ft 11 in)
- Position: Goalkeeper

Team information
- Current team: Atlas (goalkeeping coach)

Senior career*
Years	Team	Apps	(Gls)
2001–2005	Atlas	34	(0)
2003–2004	→ Toluca (loan)	3	(0)
2004	→ Veracruz (loan)	6	(0)
2006–2011	América	46	(0)
2006	→ Zacatepec (loan)	2	(0)
2012	→ Atlante (loan)	14	(0)
2012–2013	→ Necaxa (loan)	28	(0)
2013–2014	→ Puebla (loan)	0	(0)
2014–2015	Irapuato	26	(0)
2015–2016	Sonora	30	(0)
2016–2017	Zacatepec	38	(0)
2017–2021	Venados	103	(0)
Total		330	(0)

Managerial career
- 2021–2024: Venados (goalkeeping coach)
- 2024–2025: Mazatlán (goalkeeping coach)
- 2025–: Atlas (goalkeeping coach)
- * Club domestic league appearances and goals

Armando Navarrete García (born 22 November 1980) is a Mexican former professional footballer who played as a goalkeeper.

== Career ==
Navarrete made his debut at the professional level in a game between Atlas and Puebla, on September 8, 2001. Navarrete came in as a sub and gave up one goal, and ensuring the victory for Atlas in a game that ended 3–1. The following season, Navarrete saw action in four games, allowing 12 goals. In the Apertura 2002 season, Armando was Atlas' starting goalkeeper, and played in all 19 games for the Rojinegros, giving up 31 goals in the process.

After another season at Atlas where he was once again relegated to the bench, Navarrete was transferred to Toluca where it was hoped he would be the heir apparent to Toluca's long-time veteran goalkeeper, Hernán Cristante. After a year in which he saw limited action, Navarrete asked the club for a change, and he was transferred to Veracruz prior to the Apertura 2004 season. However, Navarrete was once again not able to compete for a starting job, and after a year at Veracruz, returned to Atlas to play with the team in the Apertura 2005 season, in which he played in seven games, replacing the injured starter Antonio Pérez Delgadillo.

=== Club América ===
Navarrete was Club América's only signing to bolster the squad before the Clausura 2006, after Dorados de Sinaloa goalkeeper Cirilo Saucedo turned down the team after an initial agreement.

During the Clausura 2006 season, Navarrete filled in for starting goalkeeper Guillermo Ochoa after Ochoa was named to the Mexican 2006 FIFA World Cup squad.

For the Clausura 2007 away fixture versus C.F. Pachuca, Navarrete started in the goal for Ochoa, who had returned injured from the game between Mexico and Venezuela.

Navarrete also filled in for Ochoa for the SuperLiga, in which America got eliminated. He also started the first match against Puebla. He had a great performance with 3 clean sheets out of the 4 when played in the Apertura 2007.

In the first game of the 2009 World Football Challenge, Navarrete gave up one goal to Ivan Ramiro Cordoba of Inter Milan, but managed to hold on for a 1–1 score after ninety minutes. America later won 5–4 in penalty kicks in front of a largely pro-America crowd. In the second game, they played against AC Milan in which Club America won the game 2–1. In the final game, America played against Chelsea FC, where they lost 0–2.

Navarrete remained America's second-choice keeper, waiting for a chance to become the starter when Ochoa left for Europe. Following the Clausura 2011, Navarrete declared that if Ochoa remained at the club, then Navarrete would enter the supplemental draft. Following Ochoa's signing with France's AC Ajaccio, Navarrete became America's starting goalkeeper. However, America would go on to have a poor season, winning only three games and given up many goals. As a result, Navarrete was loaned out to Atlante.
