= Diego de Buen =

Mexican footballer (born 1991)

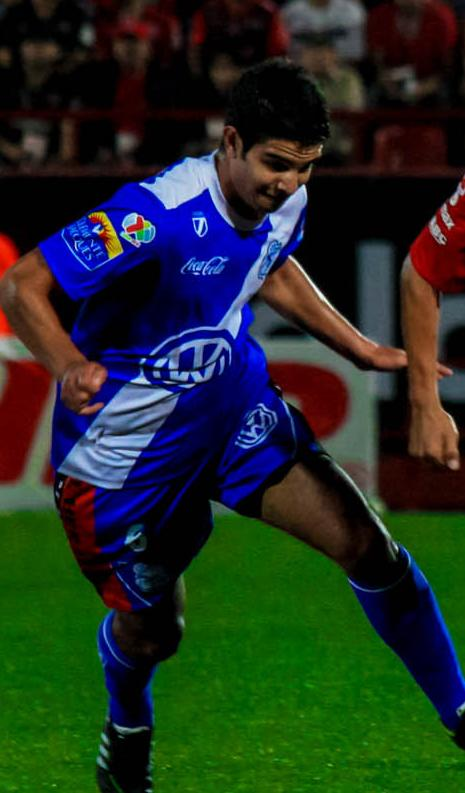
- De Buen playing for Puebla in 2012

Personal information
- Full name: Diego Eduardo de Buen Juárez
- Date of birth: 3 July 1991 (age 35)
- Place of birth: Mexico City, Mexico
- Height: 1.82 m (5 ft 11 1/2 in)
- Position: Defensive midfielder

Team information
- Current team: Atlético Morelia
- Number: 6

Youth career
- 2007–2011: UNAM

Senior career*
Years	Team	Apps	(Gls)
2009–2011	Pumas Morelos	11	(0)
2010–2012	UNAM	7	(0)
2012–2013	Puebla	48	(5)
2014–2015	Pachuca	34	(3)
2015	Tijuana	14	(0)
2016–2019	Santos Laguna	64	(3)
2020	→ Tampico Madero (loan)	27	(9)
2021–2024	Puebla	136	(11)
2025	Necaxa	27	(2)
2026	Sporting F.C.	10	(0)
2026–	Atlético Morelia	15	(2)

International career
2011	Mexico U20	14	(2)
Medal record
Representing Mexico
Winner	CONCACAF U-20 Championship	2011
Third place	FIFA U-20 World Cup	2011
- * Club domestic league appearances and goals as of 15 August 2026

Diego Eduardo de Buen Juárez (born 3 July 1991) is a Mexican professional footballer who plays as a defensive midfielder for Liga FPD club Sporting F.C.

== Career ==
=== Youth career ===
De Bueno joined Pumas youth academy in 2008. He continued through Pumas Youth Academy successfully going through Pumas Morelos and U-20. Until finally reaching the first team, Guillermo Vázquez being the coach promoting de Bueno to first team.

=== Santos Laguna ===
On 29 November 2015, Santos Laguna announced that they had reach an agreement with Club Tijuana for the services of de Buen.

== Honours ==
Santos Laguna

- Liga MX: Clausura 2018

Tampico Madero

- Liga de Expansión MX: Guard1anes 2020

Mexico U20

- CONCACAF U-20 Championship: 2011
