= Gonzalo Porras =

Uruguayan footballer (born 1984)

Personal information
- Full name: Gonzalo Fabián Porras Burghi
- Date of birth: 31 January 1984 (age 42)
- Place of birth: Montevideo, Uruguay
- Height: 1.74 m (5 ft 8 1/2 in)
- Position: Midfielder

Senior career*
Years	Team	Apps	(Gls)
2002–2004	Alianza (Uruguay)	29	(2)
2005	Liverpool Montevideo	7	(0)
2005–2008	Juventud	69	(3)
2008–2013	River Plate Montevideo	91	(2)
2010	→ Danubio (loan)	28	(0)
2012	→ Toluca (loan)	3	(0)
2013–2014	Danubio	30	(1)
2014–2018	Nacional	85	(2)
2018	Olimpo	4	(0)
2018–2020	Cerro	18	(0)
2020	Villa Teresa	18	(0)

Managerial career
- 2021: Villa Teresa (sporting director)
- 2021–2022: Querétaro (Assistant)
- * Club domestic league appearances and goals

Gonzalo Fabián Porras Burghi (born 31 January 1984 in Montevideo) is a retired Uruguayan footballer and current sporting director of Villa Teresa.

== Career ==
=== After retirement ===
After retiring at the end of 2020, Porras was appointed sporting director of Villa Teresa in January 2021.
