= Francisco Franco (footballer) =

Mexican footballer (born 1987)

Personal information
- Full name: Francisco Vidal Franco Cisneros
- Date of birth: 25 August 1987 (age 39)
- Place of birth: Autlán, Jalisco, Mexico
- Height: 1.82 m (6 ft 0 in)
- Position: Defender

Team information
- Current team: Deportivo Toluca

Senior career*
Years	Team	Apps	(Gls)
2007–	Toluca	13	(0)
2009–2012	→ La Piedad (loan)	2	(0)
2012	→ Querétaro (loan)	0	(0)
- * Club domestic league appearances and goals as of 8 July 2012

Francisco Vidal Franco Cisneros (born 25 August 1987) is a Mexican footballer, who plays as defender for Deportivo Toluca.

== Club career ==
Franco was one of the many uprooted young players from Toluca's secondary squad Atlético Mexiquense by then coach Américo Gallego. He made his professional debut with Toluca during the Clausura 2007 season.
