= Juan Carlos Silva (footballer) =

Mexican footballer (born 1988)

Personal information
- Full name: Juan Carlos Silva Maya
- Date of birth: 6 February 1988 (age 38)
- Place of birth: Mexico City, Mexico
- Height: 1.74 m (5 ft 9 in)
- Position: Midfielder

Senior career*
Years	Team	Apps	(Gls)
2006–2010	América	63	(3)
2011	Necaxa	8	(0)
2011–2013	Pachuca	4	(0)
2012	→ La Piedad (loan)	6	(0)
2012	→ San Luis (loan)	1	(0)
2013	→ Irapuato (loan)	9	(0)
2013–2014	Celaya F.C.	28	(0)
2014–2015	Altamira	29	(1)
2015	Malacateco	19	(2)
2016	Murciélagos	13	(1)
2016–2017	Correcaminos UAT	16	(1)
2017	Sanarate	19	(1)
2018	Xelajú MC	24	(5)
2019–2020	Sanarate	50	(8)
2020–2021	Cobán Imperial	13	(1)

International career
2005	Mexico U17	2	(0)
2007	Mexico U20	2	(0)
2006–2008	Mexico U23	7	(0)
Medal record
Representing Mexico
Men's football
FIFA U-17 World Cup
Winner	2005 Peru
- * Club domestic league appearances and goals as of 15 January 2021

Juan Carlos Silva Maya (born 6 February 1988) is a former Mexican professional footballer who played as a midfielder.

He made his league debut for America on 12 August 2007 against Chiapas in a 6–1 victory at the Estadio Azteca.

Silva has represented his country in international competition, competing for Mexico U-17 squad in the 2005 U-17 FIFA World Cup, which Mexico won.

== Assault ==
In February 2010 he was shot in the buttocks during an attempted robbery in Mexico City, only a week after his teammate Salvador Cabañas was shot in the head in a bar.

== Honours ==
Mexico U17

- FIFA U-17 World Championship: 2005
