= David Quiroz =

Ecuadorian Association footballer (born 1982)

Personal information
- Full name: Mario David Quiroz Villón
- Date of birth: 8 September 1982 (age 44)
- Place of birth: Guayaquil, Ecuador
- Height: 1.75 m (5 ft 9 in)
- Position: Midfielder

Youth career
- 2001–2002: El Nacional U-20

Senior career*
Years	Team	Apps	(Gls)
2001–2007	El Nacional	206	(36)
2008–2009	→ Barcelona SC (loan)	39	(11)
2009–2011	Emelec	85	(18)
2012–2013	Atlante	8	(0)
2012	→ LDU Quito (loan)	13	(0)
2013	→ Deportivo Quito (loan)	4	(0)
2014–2015	Olmedo	12	(0)
2016	Guayaquil S.C.	30	(2)

International career
2004–2012	Ecuador	31	(0)
- * Club domestic league appearances and goals

Mario David Quiroz Villón (born September 8, 1982) is an Ecuadorian former professional association footballer who played as a midfielder.

== Club career ==
Born in Guayaquil, Quiroz started at El Nacional. He was a starter in the Copa Sudamericana 2007 and in the 2007 Copa Libertadores.

In January 2008, he signed a contract for the successful Ecuadorian Barcelona. He recently has had excellent performances with his new club. He was a regular starter for head coach, Reinaldo Merlo.

In January 2009 Quiroz signed with Emelec for three years.

On 10 December 2011 Quiroz was transferred to Mexico club Atlante FC.

In January 2012, he was on loan with LDU Quito for one year.

== International career ==
Quiroz is seen as a promising player; he has played for the Ecuador national team and made his beginning appearances against Sweden. His next international appearance was in a friendly against Ireland in the Giants Stadium, New York City. He had no play for the Copa América 2007 for Ecuador. He has seen playing time so far in Ecuador's 2010 World Cup qualifying tournament, starting in the 5–1 win over Peru in Quito.

== Honors ==
El Nacional

- Ecuadorian Serie A: 2005 Clausura, 2006
