= Félix Araujo =

Mexican footballer (born 1983)

Personal information
- Full name: Félix de Jesus Araujo Razo
- Date of birth: 10 February 1983 (age 43)
- Place of birth: Guadalajara, Jalisco, Mexico
- Height: 1.86 m (6 ft 1 in)
- Position: Defender

Youth career
- Cruz Azul

Senior career*
Years	Team	Apps	(Gls)
2005–2006	Cruz Azul Oaxaca	26	(1)
2006–2008	Cruz Azul Hidalgo	37	(3)
2008	2 de Mayo	16	(1)
2008–2009	Lobos BUAP	27	(3)
2010	La Piedad	12	(0)
2011–2012	Toluca	11	(0)
2012–2013	San Luis	14	(0)
2013–2017	Chiapas	61	(2)
2014–2015	→ U. de G. (loan)	31	(0)
2017–2018	Cafetaleros de Tapachula	40	(2)
- * Club domestic league appearances and goals

Félix de Jesus Araujo Razo (born 10 February 1983), is a Mexican former footballer who played as a defender.

== Career ==
Araujo made his official Liga MX debut for Toluca in July 2011.

In his youth career with Cruz Azul, Araujo was never able to break through to the senior team and only played for the second tier reserves squads: Cruz Azul Oaxaca and Cruz Azul Hidalgo . In January 2008, he went to Paraguay to play for local team Club 2 de Mayo, where he spent the next six months without much success. He later returned to his homeland, where he played for the second division teams Lobos BUAP and C.F. La Piedad.

His younger brother, Néstor, is also a defender, who currently plays for Celta de Vigo.

After the relegation and dissolution of Jaguares de Chiapas, Araujo, along with some of his other Chiapas teammates, joined fellow chiapas team Cafetaleros de Tapachula for the upcoming 2017-2018 Ascenso Mx season.

== Honours ==
Cafetaleros de Tapachula

- Ascenso MX: Clausura 2018
