= Matías Abelairas =

Argentine footballer

Personal information
- Full name: Matías Enrique Abelairas
- Date of birth: June 18, 1985 (age 41)
- Place of birth: Olavarría, Buenos Aires Province, Argentina
- Height: 1.70 m (5 ft 7 in)
- Position: Midfielder

Senior career*
Years	Team	Apps	(Gls)
2004–2011	River Plate	89	(10)
2012	Vasco da Gama	3	(0)
2012–2013	Puebla	13	(1)
2013–2014	Unión Española	22	(0)
2014	Vaslui	11	(0)
2015–2016	Banfield	7	(0)
2016	Independiente Rivadavia	17	(2)
2016–2017	Nea Salamina	25	(0)
2017–2019	Independiente Rivadavia	10	(1)
2020	Atlético Palmaflor	22	(0)
Total		219	(14)
- * Club domestic league appearances and goals as of 2 September 2023

Matías Enrique Abelairas (born 18 June 1985) is an Argentine former footballer who played as a midfielder.

== Honours ==
River Plate

- Argentine Clausura: 2004, 2008

Unión Española

- Chilean Primera División: 2013
- Supercopa de Chile: 2013
