= José Hiber Ruiz =

Mexican footballer (born 1980)

José Hiber Ruíz
Personal information
- Full name: José Hiber Ruíz Nataren
- Date of birth: January 31, 1980 (age 46)
- Place of birth: Tonalá Chiapas, Mexico
- Height: 1.62 m (5 ft 4 in)
- Position: Midfielder

Senior career*
Years	Team	Apps	(Gls)
2005–2006	Veracruz	14	(0)
2006–2010	Puebla	33	(2)
2008	→ Monterrey (loan)	8	(0)
2009	→ Veracruz (loan)		
2009	→ Lobos BUAP (loan)		
2010–2011	Veracruz	13	(1)
2011	→ Chiapas (loan)	2	(0)
2011	Indios Juárez	7	(0)
2012–2014	Puebla	0	(0)
2014	→ Lobos BUAP (loan)	0	(0)
- * Club domestic league appearances and goals as of 5 February 2014

José Hiber Ruíz Nataren (Note: In this Spanish name, the first or paternal surname is Ruíz and the second or maternal family name is Nataren.) (born 31 January 1980) is a Mexican former footballer who last played for Lobos BUAP.

== Career ==
In 2005, he began his career with club Veracruz. He debuted against Atlas with a 2–1 win. He has played with several clubs as Puebla, Monterrey and BUAP. He returned Puebla in 2010, after a short period of time playing in Liga de Ascenso and moved to his first professional team Veracruz in July 2010.

Ruiz has the joint highest balance attribute of any player on the videogame FIFA 13.
