= George Corral =

Mexican footballer (born 1990)

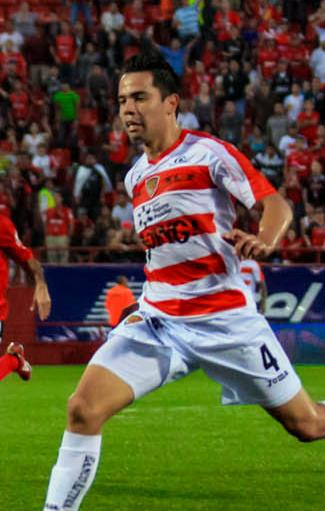
- Corral playing for Chiapas

Personal information
- Full name: George Ulises Corral Ang
- Date of birth: 18 July 1990 (age 36)
- Place of birth: Ecatepec de Morelos, Mexico
- Height: 1.75 m (5 ft 9 in)
- Position: Defender

Senior career*
Years	Team	Apps	(Gls)
2008–2013	América	12	(0)
2012–2013	→ Chiapas (loan)	49	(0)
2013–2020	Querétaro	160	(0)
2020–2023	Puebla	75	(3)
2024	Venados	13	(0)

International career
2015	Mexico	3	(0)
- * Club domestic league appearances and goals

George Ulises Corral Ang (Note: In this Spanish name, the first or paternal surname is Corral and the second or maternal family name is Ang.) (born 18 July 1990) is a former Mexican professional footballer who played as a defender.

George Corral is the brother of female footballer Charlyn Corral.

== International career ==
On 15 April 2015, Corral made his senior national team debut in a friendly against the United States.

== Honours ==
Querétaro

- Copa MX: Apertura 2016
