= Arturo Ledesma =

Mexican footballer (born 1988)

Personal information
- Full name: Arturo Javier Ledesma Pérez
- Date of birth: 25 May 1988 (age 38)
- Place of birth: Guadalajara, Jalisco, Mexico
- Height: 1.81 m (5 ft 11 1/2 in)
- Position: Centre-back

Team information
- Current team: Marquense

Youth career
- 2005–2006: Guadalajara

Senior career*
Years	Team	Apps	(Gls)
2007–2015	Guadalajara	30	(0)
2009–2011	→ Necaxa (loan)	28	(1)
2012–2013	→ Pachuca (loan)	13	(0)
2014	→ Oaxaca (loan)	17	(0)
2014–2015	→ UAT (loan)	30	(2)
2015–2016	→ Oaxaca (loan)	29	(2)
2016–2017	Oaxaca	13	(0)
2017–2019	Tampico Madero	54	(1)
2019–2020	Oaxaca	25	(3)
2020–2023	Atlético Morelia	119	(6)
2023–2026	UdeG	67	(7)
2026–	Marquense	0	(0)

International career
2007	Mexico U20	1	(0)
- * Club domestic league appearances and goals as of 12 April 2025

Arturo Javier Ledesma Pérez (born 25 May 1988) is a Mexican professional footballer who plays as a centre-back for Liga Bantrab club Marquense.

== Biography ==
Arturo is a young player that shows a lot of potential. At only 18 years of age, he had already debuted with Mexican giants Chivas in the Clausura 2007 tournament as well as in the CONCACAF Champions' Cup. Ledesma made his professional debut on February 17, 2007, against Atlante, a 0–3 away win for the Rebaño.

== Family ==
Arturo's father is the former Chivas goalie Javier "Zully" Ledesma. One of his cousins is former professional baseball player, Nomar Garciaparra.

== Honours ==
Morelia

- Liga de Expansión MX: Clausura 2022
