= Isaac Romo =

Mexican footballer (born 1983)

Personal information
- Full name: Isaac Romo González
- Date of birth: 23 March 1983 (age 43)
- Place of birth: Guadalajara, Jalisco, Mexico
- Height: 1.94 m (6 ft 4 in)
- Position: Striker

Youth career
- Tapatío

Senior career*
Years	Team	Apps	(Gls)
2003–2008	Guadalajara	4	(1)
2005	→ Chivas USA (loan)	25	(3)
2006	→ UANL (loan)	2	(0)
2008–2014	Querétaro	101	(16)
2010–2011	→ Cruz Azul (loan)	7	(2)
2011	→ Puebla (loan)	9	(2)
2012–2013	→ Puebla (loan)	28	(2)
2014–2017	UdeG	34	(5)
2015	→ Atl. San Luis (loan)	8	(0)
2015–2016	→ Sonora (loan)	2	(0)

International career
	Mexico U20	2	(0)
- * Club domestic league appearances and goals as of 14 September 2015

Isaac Romo González (born March 23, 1983) is a Mexican former footballer, who last played for Leones Negros UdeG in the Ascenso MX.

Romo played for Chivas USA of Major League Soccer, arriving as one of imports from parent club Chivas de Guadalajara, and also played for their other child club, La Piedad. He played for the Mexico U-20 team at the 2003 World Youth Championship in the United Arab Emirates.

Romo was released by Chivas USA following the 2005 season. In December 2005, Isaac Romo joined Chiapas under a 6-month-long loan contract, but did not appear in a league match.

In Summer 2015, Romo was transferred to second division promoted team, Cimarrones de Sonora.
