= Jesús Chávez (footballer) =

Mexican footballer (born 1986)

Personal information
- Full name: Jesús Roberto Chávez Guzmán
- Date of birth: 26 April 1986 (age 40)
- Place of birth: Torreón, Coahuila, Mexico
- Height: 1.84 m (6 ft 0 in)
- Position: Centre back

Team information
- Current team: Jaiba Brava (Assistant)

Senior career*
Years	Team	Apps	(Gls)
2006–2008	Tigres UANL	43	(1)
2009–2012	Jaguares	52	(0)
2012	→ San Luis (loan)	14	(1)
2012–2014	→ Puebla (loan)	61	(3)
2014	Atlas	5	(0)
2015–2018	Tijuana	20	(2)
2015–2016	→ Dorados de Sinaloa (loan)	19	(0)
2016–2017	→ Necaxa (loan)	3	(0)
2017–2018	→ Dorados de Sinaloa (loan)	20	(1)
2018–2020	Dorados de Sinaloa	46	(1)
2020	Halcones	0	(0)

Managerial career
- 2023–2025: Tecos (Assistant)
- 2025–2026: Tecos
- 2026–: Jaiba Brava (Assistant)
- * Club domestic league appearances and goals

Jesús Roberto Chávez Guzmán (born 26 April 1986) is a Mexican professional football coach and a former defender who is the manager of Tecos.

He started his career with Tigres, making his league debut for them on 14 October 2006 against city rivals Monterrey. In all he played 43 Primera Division games for Tigres before moving to Jaguares for the Primera División de México Clausura 2009 tournament.
