= Jonathan Lacerda =

Uruguayan footballer (born 1987)

Personal information
- Full name: Jonathan Leonardo Lacerda Araujo
- Date of birth: 7 February 1987 (age 39)
- Place of birth: Montevideo, Uruguay
- Height: 1.92 m (6 ft 4 in)
- Position: Centre-back

Senior career*
Years	Team	Apps	(Gls)
2005–2010	Montevideo Wanderers	11	(6)
2010–2015	Santos Laguna	53	(1)
2011	→ Atlas (loan)	16	(0)
2012	→ Necaxa (loan)	11	(1)
2012–2013	→ Puebla (loan)	53	(1)
2015	→ Dorados de Sinaloa (loan)	19	(0)
2015–2017	Dorados de Sinaloa	25	(1)
2016–2017	→ Celaya (loan)	29	(0)
2017–2020	FC Juárez	72	(2)
2020	Salamanca UDS	6	(0)
2021–2022	Alianza Lima	16	(0)
2022	Montevideo Wanderers	16	(0)
2023–2024	Blooming	44	(2)
- * Club domestic league appearances and goals

Jonathan Leonardo Lacerda Araujo (born 7 February 1987) is a Uruguayan professional footballer who played as a centre-back. His last club was Bolivian first division side Blooming.

== Career ==
Lacerda made his professional debut with Montevideo Wanderers in 2005. He played with Montevideo Wanderers until 2010, when he was transferred to Mexican club Santos Laguna. In the final of the "Torneo Bicentenario" he scored a penalty kick.

In 2011 Lacerda was loaned to Club Atlas where he played 16 games.

For the Apertura 2012 he was loaned to Ascenso MX team Necaxa.

Lacerda played for Puebla from Clausura 2012 until Clausura 2013.

He returned to Santos Laguna for the Clausura 2013, playing a total of 14 games, but was listed on the transfer list for the next tournament.

For the Clausura 2015, Dorados announced Lacerda as their new defender. He was the leader of the defense. On the transfer window celebrated in Cancun, Mexico, Dorados announced via Twitter that they had purchased Lacerda's rights in an undisclosed fee.
