= Edison Toloza =

Colombian footballer (born 1984)

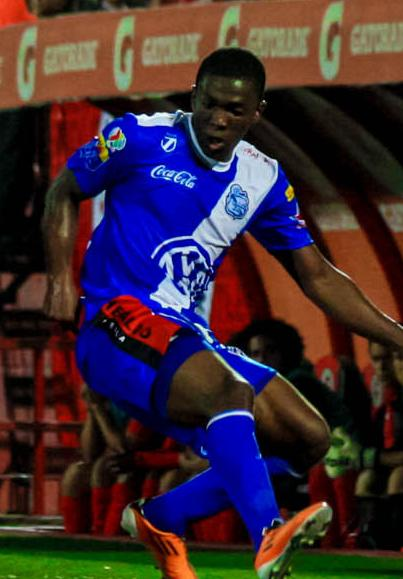

Personal information
- Full name: Edison Toloza Colorado
- Date of birth: 15 June 1984 (age 42)
- Place of birth: Iscuandé, Nariño, Colombia
- Height: 1.75 m (5 ft 9 in)
- Position: Winger

Senior career*
Years	Team	Apps	(Gls)
2006	Deportivo Pereira	3	(0)
2007	Deportes Quindío	35	(13)
2008–2012	Santa Fe	36	(3)
2009	→ Deportivo Pereira (loan)	13	(2)
2009–2010	→ América de Cali (loan)	33	(7)
2011	→ Millonarios (loan)	38	(20)
2012	→ Monarcas Morelia (loan)	0	(0)
2012	Monarcas Morelia	8	(0)
2012	Puebla	14	(2)
2013–2017	Junior	130	(40)
2014–2015	→ Jiangsu Sainty (loan)	14	(2)
2017	→ Independiente Medellín (loan)	16	(4)
2018	Deportivo Pasto	17	(5)
2018	Rionegro Águilas	15	(1)
2019	Correcaminos UAT	7	(1)
2019	Jaguares de Córdoba	4	(0)
- * Club domestic league appearances and goals as of 15:33, 19 February 2020 (UTC)

Edison Toloza Colorado (Latin American Spanish: [ˈeðison toˈlosa]; born 15 June 1984) is a Colombian footballer who plays as a winger for Correcaminos UAT.

One of the most skillful and fast forwards in the domestic league, his great speed is his best argument to face the rival defenses. Player of great mobility, power and speed in short passages, always succeeding to score goals from any position. Commonly nicknamed by the football fans as Tolotelli due to his resemblance in personality to Mario Balotelli.

== Career ==
=== Jaguares de Córdoba ===
On 6 September 2019 it was confirmed, that Toloza had joined Jaguares de Córdoba. However, it was announced on 29 September 2019, that he had left the club again.
