= Dionicio Escalante =

Mexican footballer (born 1990)

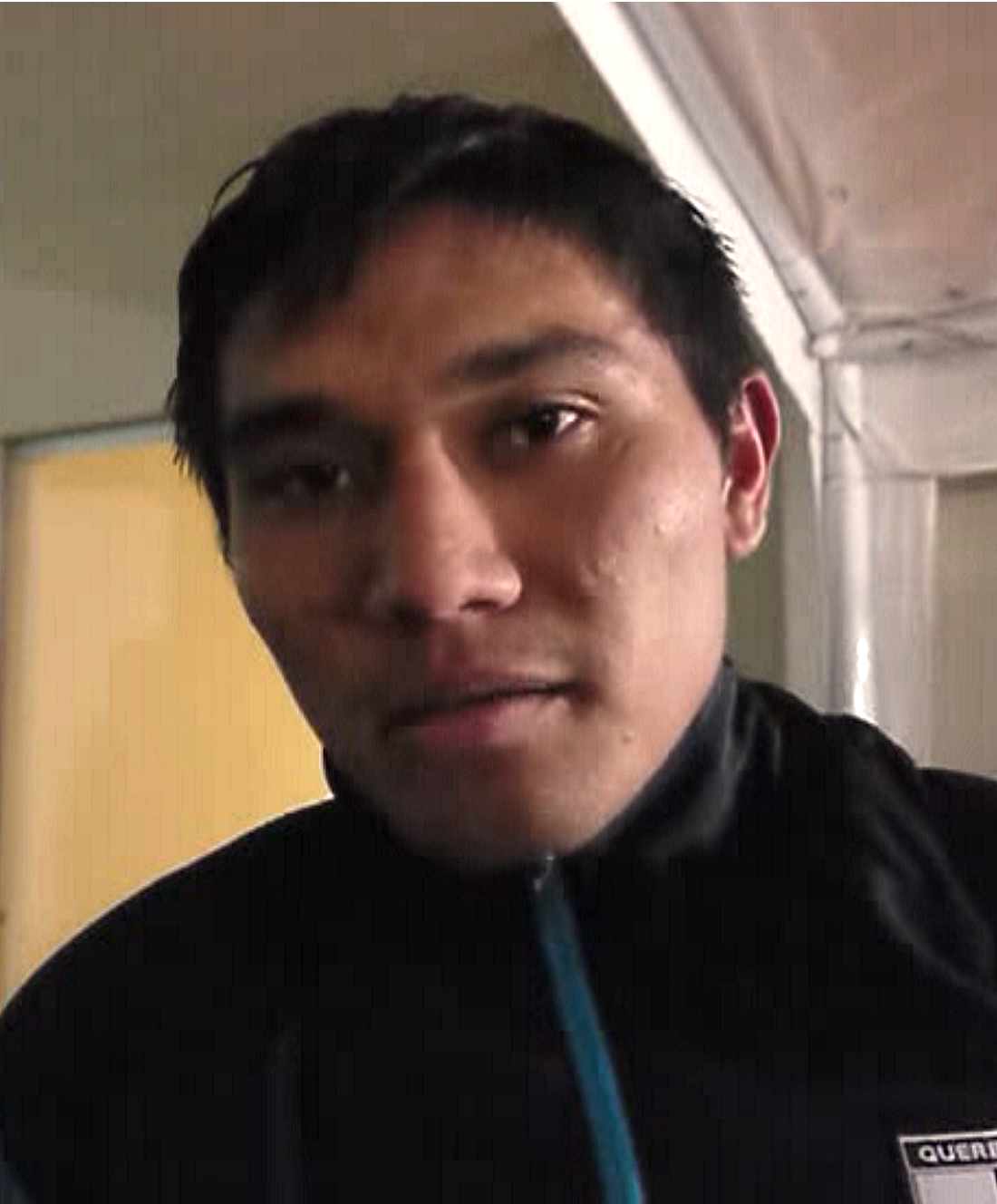
- Escalante in 2013

Personal information
- Full name: Dionicio Manuel Escalante Moreno
- Date of birth: 12 May 1990 (age 36)
- Place of birth: Culiacán, Sinaloa Mexico
- Height: 1.70 m (5 ft 7 in)
- Position: Defensive midfielder

Senior career*
Years	Team	Apps	(Gls)
2009–2010	Dorados	31	(0)
2010–2013	Guadalajara	11	(0)
2011–2012	→ Pachuca (loan)	4	(0)
2012–2013	→ Querétaro (loan)	24	(0)
2013–2017	Querétaro	72	(1)
2017–2018	Unión Adarve	27	(0)
2018	Cultural Leonesa	14	(0)
2019–2021	Atlético San Luis	43	(0)
2021–2022	Talavera de la Reina	22	(1)
2022–2023	UdeG	33	(1)
- * Club domestic league appearances and goals as of 21 October 2022

Dionicio Manuel Escalante Moreno (born 12 May 1990) is a Mexican professional footballer who plays as a defensive midfielder.

== Club career ==
In January 2019, he moved to Atlético San Luis.

== Honours ==
Guadalajara

- Copa Libertadores runner-up: 2010

Querétaro

- Copa MX: Apertura 2016
