= Luis Miguel Noriega =

Mexican footballer (born 1985)

Personal information
- Full name: Luis Miguel Noriega Orozco
- Date of birth: 17 April 1985 (age 41)
- Place of birth: Tepotzotlán, Mexico
- Height: 1.73 m (5 ft 8 in)
- Position: Midfielder

Senior career*
Years	Team	Apps	(Gls)
2005–2010	Puebla	179	(8)
2010–2011	Morelia	36	(0)
2012–2013	→ Chiapas (loan)	19	(0)
2012–2015	Puebla	83	(10)
2015–2018	Querétaro	74	(5)
2018–2019	Veracruz	13	(0)
2019	Puebla	1	(0)
Total		405	(23)

International career
2009–2010	Mexico	6	(1)

Managerial career
- 2020–2023: Puebla Reserves and Academy
- 2023–2024: Puebla (Assistant)
Medal record
Representing Mexico
CONCACAF Gold Cup
Winner	CONCACAF Gold Cup	2009
- * Club domestic league appearances and goals

Luis Miguel Noriega Orozco (born 17 April 1985) is a Mexican professional football coach and a former midfielder.

== Club career ==
His professional debut came during the Apertura 2007 season, on August 5, 2007 – in a game against Club América. He scored his first professional goal in a match against Club Necaxa. He was Puebla team captain until getting transferred after the Bicentenario 2010.

Noriega was transferred to Monarcas Morelia on May 18, 2010. After 1 year of being with the club, he was then loaned out to Chiapas.

== International career ==
Noriega earned his first international cap with Mexico on June 24, 2009, against Venezuela, he also was called up to play in the 2009 CONCACAF Gold Cup by Mexican coach Javier Aguirre. He scored his first international goal with Mexico in the 2009 CONCACAF Gold Cup match against Nicaragua.

== Career statistics ==
=== International ===
As of match played 18 March 2010

National team	Year	Apps	Goals
Mexico	2009	4	1
Mexico	2010	2	0
Total		6	1

=== International goals ===
No.	Date	Venue	Opponent	Score	Result	Competition	Ref.
1.	5 July 2009	Oakland–Alameda County Coliseum, Oakland, United States	Nicaragua	1–0	2–0	2009 CONCACAF Gold Cup	

== Honours ==
Puebla

- Primera A: Apertura 2006
- Ascenso MX: 2007
- Copa MX: Clausura 2015

Morelia

- North American SuperLiga: 2010

Querétaro

- Copa MX: Apertura 2016
- Supercopa MX: 2017

Mexico

- CONCACAF Gold Cup: 2009
