= Jorge Villalpando =

Mexican footballer (born 1985)

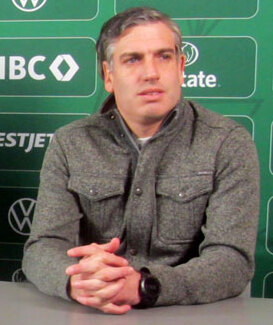
- Villalpando in 2024

Personal information
- Full name: Jorge Villalpando Romo
- Date of birth: 13 March 1985 (age 41)
- Place of birth: Mexico City, Mexico
- Height: 1.76 m (5 ft 9 1/2 in)
- Position: Goalkeeper

Team information
- Current team: Inter Toronto (general manager)

Senior career*
| Years | Team | Apps | (Gls) |
| 2005–2009 | Puebla | 94 | (0) |
| 2010–2011 | Chiapas | 28 | (0) |
| 2011 | → Toluca (loan) | 0 | (0) |
| 2012 | → Atlas (loan) | 1 | (0) |
| 2012–2013 | → Atlante (loan) | 33 | (0) |
| 2013–2014 | Puebla | 34 | (0) |
| 2014 | → Pachuca (loan) | 0 | (0) |
| 2015 | → Morelia (loan) | 4 | (0) |
| 2015–2017 | Chiapas | 14 | (0) |
| 2017–2018 | Lobos BUAP | 14 | (0) |
| Total | | 222 | (0) |

Managerial career
- 2021–2022: Tlaxcala (goalkeeping coach)
- 2022: Tlaxcala (Interim)
- 2022–2023: Tlaxcala
- * Club domestic league appearances and goals

Jorge Villalpando Romo (Spanish pronunciation: [ˈxoɾxe βiʎalˈpando], born 13 March 1985) is a Mexican former professional footballer who played as a goalkeeper. He currently serves as the General Manager of Canadian Premier League Inter Toronto FC.

== Club career ==
=== Puebla ===
Although he has been in the first team since 2005, he made his professional debut in the Primera División (First Division) until the Apertura 2007 tournament on October 21 against Toluca. It was Puebla's first tournament after returning to the First Division when relegated to the Liga de Ascenso during the Clausura 2005 tournament. The game resulted in a 0–2 loss for Puebla.

=== Loan spells ===
Villalpando has been out on loan to multiple Liga MX clubs from his parent club, Morelia. In 2017 Jorge Villalpando was signed by Lobos BUAP recently promoted to la Liga MX from the ascenso mx he became regular starter then was demoted from 1st choice keeper to the bench Jose Antonio Rodriguez loaned from chivas de Guadalajara took over the starting position.

== International career ==
Villalpando was chosen by Hugo Sánchez to play for the Mexico national team but he did not see any action.

== Post-playing career ==
In January 2024, Villalpando was named technical and sporting director of Canadian Premier League side York United FC. In November 2024, he was promoted to the title of General Manager.
