= 2011–12 Puebla F.C. season =

Puebla
2011–12 season
- Chairman: Ricardo Henaine
- Manager: Sergio Bueno (May, 2011–Nov., 2011); Juan Carlos Osorio (Nov. 2011–Mar. 2012); Daniel Roberto Bartolotta (from Mar. 2012)
- Stadium: Estadio Cuauhtémoc
- Apertura 2011: 12th
- Clausura 2012: 12th
- Top goalscorer: League: Apertura: Luis García (7); Clausura: Luis García (6); All: Luis García (13)
Home colours	Away colours	Third colours

The 2011–12 Puebla season was the 65th professional season of Mexico's top-flight football league. The season is split into two tournaments—the Torneo Apertura and the Torneo Clausura—each with identical formats and each contested by the same eighteen teams. Puebla began their season on July 23, 2011, against Atlas, Puebla play their homes games on Sundays at 12:00pm local time.

== Torneo Apertura ==
=== Squad ===
Note: Flags indicate national team as defined under FIFA eligibility rules; some limited exceptions apply. Players may hold more than one non-FIFA nationality.

No.	Pos.	Nation	Player
1	GK	MEX	Mario Rodríguez
2	DF	MEX	Aldo Polo
3	DF	MEX	Jaime Durán
4	DF	MEX	Diego Cervantes
5	DF	MEX	Álvaro Ortiz
6	DF	MEX	Obed Rincón
7	MF	MEX	Gonzalo Pineda
8	MF	MEX	Alan Zamora
9	FW	MEX	Daniel Osorno
10	MF	ARG	Gabriel Pereyra
11	MF	USA	DaMarcus Beasley
13	FW	MEX	Isaac Romo
14	FW	ESP	Luis García
15	DF	MEX	Uriel Álvarez

No.	Pos.	Nation	Player
16	MF	MEX	Diego Campos
17	MF	BRA	Lucas Silva
18	FW	MEX	Brayan Martínez
19	FW	MEX	Antonio López
20	FW	COL	Duvier Riascos
21	MF	MEX	Cesáreo Victorino
23	DF	MEX	Francisco León
24	FW	MEX	Aarón Padilla
26	DF	MEX	Roberto Juárez
27	DF	MEX	Francisco Pizano
28	MF	MEX	Marco Ramírez
29	MF	MEX	Rodrigo Salinas
33	GK	MEX	Alexandro Álvarez

=== Apertura 2011 Movements ===
- Updated on August 29, 2011.

Coming In
Player	Position	Coming From	Type
Diego Campos	Midfielder	Loros de la Universidad de Colima	Loan
Alan Zamora	Midfielder	Chiapas	Loan
Isaac Romo	Forward	Cruz Azul	Loan
Cesáreo Victorino	Midfielder	Lobos de la BUAP	loan
Álvaro Ortiz	Midfielder	Deportivo Toluca	Extended loan
Daniel Osorno	Forward	Club Atlas de Guadalajara	Loan
Obed Rincón	Defender	Club Necaxa	Loan
Alexandro Álvarez	Goalkeeper	Club Necaxa	Extended loan
Diego Cervantes	Defender	Club América	loan
Francisco Giovanni	Goalkeeper	Club Atlas de Guadalajara	Loan
Gonzalo Pineda	Midfielder	Club Deportivo Guadalajara	loan
Jaime Durán	Defender	Monarcas Morelia	Loan
Antonio López	Forward	Club América	loan
Aldo Polo	Defender	Club León	Loan
Lucas Silva	Midfielder	Dorados de Sinaloa	1 year Contract
Mario Rodríguez	Goalkeeper	Estudiantes Tecos	Loan
Uriel Álvarez	Defender	Club Santos Laguna	Loan
DaMarcus Beasley	Midfielder	Hannover 96	1 year contract
Luis García	Forward	Panathinaikos F.C.	1 year contract
Duvier Riascos	Forward	Shanghai Shenhua F.C.	Loan

Going out
Player	Position	Going to	TYPE
Félix Borja	Forward	Club de Fútbol Pachuca	Sold
Orlando Rincón	Defender	Chiapas	On Loan
Melvin Brown	Defender	Estudiantes Tecos	Loan ended
Yasser Corona	Defender	Monarcas Morelia	Loan Ended
Edgar Castillo	Defender	Club América	Loan ended
Gerardo Lugo	Midfielder	Monarcas Morelia	Loan Ended
Alejandro Acosta	Defender	Tiburones Rojos de Veracruz	Sold
Édgar Hernández	Goalkeeper	Chiapas	Loan Ended
Joel González	Midfielder	San Luis Fútbol Club	Loan ended
Guillermo Cerda	Goalkeeper	Chiapas	Loan ended
Nelson Cuevas	Forward	Cerro Porteño	Contracted ended
Alejandro Argüello	Midfielder	Libre	Loan Ended
Walter Jiménez	Midfielder	Club América	Loan ended
Felipe Ayala	Midfielder	Monarcas Morelia	Loan Ended.
Pablo Aja	Midfielder	Club León	On loan
Jorge Zárate	Midfielder	Lobos de la BUAP	On Loan
Eder Pacheco	Forward	Club León	On Loan
Sergio Rosas	Midfielder	Lobos de la BUAP	On loan

=== Regular season ===
==== Apertura 2011 results ====
July 23, 2011 Round 1	Atlas	0–1	Puebla	Estadio Jalisco, Guadalajara
20:45	Lacerda (yellow card) 11'; Vidrio (yellow card) 53'	Report	Juárez (yellow card) 42'; Luis García 54'; Lucas Silva (yellow card) 59' (yellow-red card) 69'; Rodríguez (yellow card) 83'	Referee: Mauricio Morales

July 30, 2011 Round 2	Puebla	2–2	Pachuca	Estadio Cuauhtémoc, Puebla
12:00	Riascos 20'; Luis García 32'; Juárez (yellow card) 35'; Riascos (yellow card) 46'; Durán (yellow card) 75'; Beasley (yellow card) 82'; Salinas (yellow card) 89'	Report	Cejas (yellow card) 62'; Esqueda 68'; Ayoví 83'; Rodríguez (yellow card) 89'	Referee: Fabricio Morales

August 3, 2011 Round 3	Atlante	5–1	Puebla	Estadio Quintana Roo, Cancún
21:00	Venegas 23'; Maldonado 37' (pen.); Bermúdez 41', 77'; Ortiz (yellow card) 70'; Diego (yellow card) 90*2'; Cuevas 90+3'	Report	Cervantes (yellow card) 33'; Luis García (yellow card) 35'; Lucas Silva 57'	Referee: Jorge Isaac Rojas

August 7, 2011 Round 4	Puebla	1–2	Chiapas	Estadio Cuauhtémoc, Puebla
12:00	Durán (yellow card) 13'; Luis García 5' (pen.); Cervantes (yellow card) 36'; Salinas (red card) 44'	Report	Arizala 31'; M. Martínez (red card) 62'; J. Martínez 73'	Referee: Erim Ramírez

August 14, 2011 Round 5	Tijuana	1–1	Puebla	Estadio Caliente, Tijuana
12:00	Moreno 7', (yellow card) 55'; Arévalo Ríos (yellow card) 77'; Leandro (yellow card) 79'	Report	Riascos 15'; Lucas Silva (yellow card) 76'; Cervantes (yellow card) 79'	Referee: Fernando Guerrero

August 21, 2011 Round 6	Puebla	2–1	UNAM	Estadio Cuauhtémoc, Puebla
12:00	Zamora 13', (yellow card) 14'; Beasley 24', (yellow card) 25'; Ortiz (yellow card) 73'; Victorino (yellow card) 82'; Juárez (yellow card) 90'	Report	Cabrera (yellow card) 18' (yellow-red card) 36'; Espinoza (yellow card) 32'; Cortés (yellow card) 33', (goal) 75'	Referee: Juan Genaro Medrano

August 28, 2011 Round 7	Morelia	0–0	Puebla	Estadio Morelos, Morelia
18:00	Gastelúm (yellow card) 77'	Report	Juárez (yellow card) 26'; Álvarez (yellow card) 90'	Referee: Roberto García Orozco

September 11, 2011 Round 8	Puebla	3–3	Monterrey	Estadio Cuauhtémoc, Puebla
12:00	Luis García (yellow card) 8'; Álvarez (yellow card) 9'; Romo 67', 79'; Riascos (yellow card) 69'; Juárez 72'	Report	Pérez (yellow card) 8', (goal) 90+4'; Suazo 11'; Zavala (yellow card) 21'; Delgado 58', (yellow card) 71' de Nigris (yellow card) 60'; Meza (yellow card) 81'; Vucetich (red card) 81' (manager)	Referee: Óscar Macias

September 17, 2011 Round 9	Guadalajara	1–4	Puebla	Estadio Jalisco, Guadalajara
19:00	Fabián 26' (pen.); Magallón (red card) 57'; Mejía (yellow card) 61'; Álvarez (yellow card) 67' (yellow-red card); Michel (yellow card) 84'; Reynoso (yellow card) 84'	Report	Pineda (yellow card) 22'; Polo (yellow card) 31'; Silva 44', 89'; Luis García 59' (pen.); Juárez (yellow card) 78'; Zamora 90+2'	Referee: Miguel Ángel Ortega

September 25, 2011 Round 10	Puebla	1–2	Santos Laguna	Estadio Cuauhtémoc, Puebla
12:00	Pineda (yellow card) 15'; Silva (yellow card) 28'; Beasley (yellow card) 30'; Riascos 58' (pen.); Durán (yellow card) 86'	Report	Ludueña (yellow card) 15'; Estrada (yellow card) 33'; Quintero 45'; Peralta 48', (yellow card) 56'; Baloy (yellow card) 50'; Sánchez (yellow card) 56'	Referee: Miguel Ángel Flores

October 1, 2011 Round 11	San Luis	2–1	Puebla	Estadio Alfonso Lastras, San Luis Potosí
20:45	Matellán (yellow card) 29'; Arroyo (yellow card) 33'; González (yellow card) 54'; Torres (yellow card) 55'; Moreno 56'; Chiapas 75'	Report	Zamora (yellow card) 9'; Beasley 12'; Zamora (yellow card) 73'; Pereyra (yellow card) 87'; Álvarez (yellow card) 90+2'	Referee: José Alfredo Peñaloza

October 8, 2011 Round 12	Cruz Azul	2–0	Puebla	Estadio Azul, Mexico City
17:00	Aquino (yellow card) 43'; Giménez (yellow card) 67'; Orozco 73', 89', (yellow card) 78'; Flores (yellow card) 86'	Report	Salinas (yellow card) 76'	Referee: César Arturo Ramos

October 16, 2011 Round 13	Puebla	1–0	Querétaro	Estadio Cuauhtémoc, Puebla
12:00	Riascos (yellow card) 55' (yellow-red card) 59', (goal) 58'; Pereyra (red card) 74'; Zamora (yellow card) 81'	Report	Rico (yellow card) 16'; Bueno (yellow card) 36'	Referee: Paul Delgadillo

October 23, 2011 Round 14	Toluca	4–3	Puebla	Estadio Nemesio Díez, Toluca
12:00	Alonso 20', 42', 51'; Talavera (yellow card) 58'; González (yellow card) 62'; Esquivel 63'	Report	Pineda 13'; Araujo 23' (o.g.); Beasley (yellow card) 42'; Zamora (yellow card) 46'; Luis García (yellow card) 74', (goal) 90+3'; Ortiz (yellow card) 89'	Referee: Marco Antonio Rodríguez

October 26, 2011 Round 15	Puebla	2–1	Estudiantes Tecos	Estadio Cuauhtémoc, Puebla
20:00	Riascos 8'; Ortiz (yellow card) 40'; Silva 59'; Polo (yellow card) 66'	Report	Pérez (yellow card) 21'; Davino (yellow card) 69'; Ruiz 90+1'	Referee: Jorge Antonio Pérez

October 30, 2011 Round 16	América	2–3	Puebla	Estadio Azteca, Mexico City
16:00	Jiménez 2'; Benítez (yellow card) 34'; Reyes (yellow card) 80'; Molina (yellow card) 84'; Vuoso 87'	Report	Luis García (yellow card) 4', (goal) 41', 81'; Riascos 45'	Referee: Jorge Eduardo Gasso

November 6, 2011 Round 17	Puebla	0–1	UANL	Estadio Cuauhtémoc, Puebla
12:00	Durán (yellow card) 21'; Ortiz (yellow card) 25'; Polo (yellow card) 37'; Luis García (yellow card) 62'; Beasley (yellow card) 69'	Report	Dueñas (yellow card) 11', (goal) 27'; Juninho (yellow card) 65'	Referee: Fabricio Morales

Puebla did not qualify to the Final Phase

=== Goalscorers ===
Position	Nation	Name	Goals scored
1.	(Spain)	Luis García	7
2.	(Colombia)	Duvier Riascos	6
3.	(Brazil)	Lucas Silva	4
4.	(United States)	DaMarcus Beasley	2
4.	(Mexico)	Isaac Romo	2
4.	(Mexico)	Alan Zamora	2
7.	(Mexico)	Roberto Juárez	1
7.	(Mexico)	Gonzalo Pineda	1
7.		Own Goals	1
TOTAL			26

=== Results ===
==== Results summary ====
Overall								Home						Away					
Pld	W	D	L	GF	GA	GD	Pts	W	D	L	GF	GA	GD	W	D	L	GF	GA	GD
17	6	4	7	26	29	−3	22	3	2	3	12	12	0	3	2	4	14	17	−3

Last updated: 6 November 2011.
Source: Apertura 2011 results

==== Results by round ====
Round	1	2	3	4	5	6	7	8	9	10	11	12	13	14	15	16	17
Ground	A	H	A	H	A	H	A	H	A	H	A	A	H	A	H	A	H
Result	W	D	L	L	D	W	D	D	W	L	L	L	W	L	W	W	L
Position	8	7	9	12	13	9	10	11	8	13	14	15	13	15	13	10	12

Updated to match(es) played on 6 November 2011. Source: Apertura 2011 results and mediotiempo.com
A = Away; H = Home; W = Win; D = Draw; L = Loss

== Transfers ==
=== In ===
#	Pos	Nat	Player	Age	From	Date	Notes
13	FW	(Mexico)	Luis Ángel Landín	26	Free agent	December 14, 2011	.
12	FW	(Ecuador)	Armando Wila	26	Barcelona Sporting Club	December 14, 2011	.
10	DF	(Uruguay)	Jonathan Lacerda	25	Club Santos Laguna	December 21, 2011	.

=== Out ===
#	Pos	Nat	Player	Age	To	Date	Notes
20	FW	(Colombia)	Duvier Riascos	25	Tijuana	December 17, 2011	
10	MF	(Argentina)	Gabriel Pereyra	33	Estudiantes Tecos	December 21, 2011	

== Torneo Clausura ==
=== Squad ===
Note: Flags indicate national team as defined under FIFA eligibility rules; some limited exceptions apply. Players may hold more than one non-FIFA nationality.

No.	Pos.	Nation	Player
1	GK	MEX	Mario Rodriguez Cervantes
2	DF	MEX	Aldo Polo
3	DF	MEX	Jaime Durán (on loan from Morelia)
4	DF	MEX	Diego Cervantes (on loan from América)
5	DF	MEX	Álvaro Ortiz
6	DF	MEX	Obed Rincón
7	MF	MEX	Gonzalo Pineda (on loan from Guadalajara)
8	MF	MEX	Alan Zamora (on loan from Chiapas)
9	MF	MEX	Daniel Osorno (on loan from Atlas)
10	DF	URU	Jonathan Lacerda
11	MF	USA	DaMarcus Beasley
12	FW	ECU	Armando Wila
13	FW	MEX	Luis Ángel Landín
14	FW	ESP	Luis García
16	MF	MEX	Diego Campos (on loan from Atlas)

No.	Pos.	Nation	Player
17	FW	BRA	Lucas Silva
18	FW	MEX	Brayan Martínez
19	FW	MEX	Antonio López (on loan from América)
21	MF	MEX	Cesáreo Victorino
22	DF	MEX	Victor Manuel Pozos
23	DF	MEX	Francisco Giovanni León (on loan from Atlas)
24	FW	MEX	Aarón Padilla
25	MF	MEX	Sergio Rosas
26	DF	MEX	Roberto Juárez (on loan from Cruz Azul)
27	DF	MEX	Francisco Pizano
28	MF	MEX	Marco Arturo Ramírez
29	MF	MEX	Rodrigo Salinas
32	MF	MEX	Juan Pablo García
31	FW	ENG	Kevin Zapata
33	GK	MEX	Alexandro Álvarez

=== Regular season ===
==== Clausura 2012 results ====
January 8, 2012 Round 1	Puebla	0–0	Atlas	Estadio Cuauhtémoc, Puebla
12:00	Pineda 39'; Salinas (yellow card) 90+1'	Report	Villalpando (yellow card) 31'; Santos (yellow card) 34'; Ayala (yellow card) 45+'; Maldonado (yellow card) 45+'; Rodríguez (yellow card) 79'; Barraza (yellow card) 81'	Referee: José Alfredo Peñaloza

January 14, 2012 Round 2	Pachuca	3–1	Puebla	Estadio Hidalgo, Pachuca
19:00	Ayoví (yellow card) 21', (goal) 30'; Bueno 76', 90+3'; Rodríguez (yellow card) 90+3'	Report	Landín 43'	Referee: Miguel Ángel Ayala

January 22, 2012 Round 3	Puebla	1–2	Atlante	Estadio Cuauhtémoc, Puebla
12:00	Lacerda (yellow card) 14'; Landín (yellow card) 34'; Luis García 72'; Pineda (yellow card) 89'	Report	Rojas (yellow card) 13'; Rincón (yellow card) 29'; Martínez 38'; Guagua (yellow card) 45+'; Mendoza 70', (yellow card) 84'; Castillo (yellow card) 77'	Referee: Jorge Antonio Pérez

January 28, 2012 Round 4	Chiapas	0–1	Puebla	Estadio Victor Manuel Reyna, Tuxtla Gutiérrez
17:00	Zamorano (yellow card) 38'; J. Hernández (yellow card) 42'; Corral (yellow card) 57'	Report	Beasley 3'; Lacerda (yellow card) 7'; Álvarez (yellow card) 28'; Juárez (yellow card) 55'; Salinas (yellow card) 88'	Referee: Mauricio Morales

February 5, 2012 Round 5	Puebla	1–1	Tijuana	Estadio Cuauhtémoc, Puebla
12:00	Riascos 6'; Lacerda (yellow card) 42'; Wila (yellow card) 77'	Report	Luis García 25' (pen.); Arce (yellow card) 32'; Santiago (yellow card) 39'; Arévalo Ríos (yellow card) 90+2'	Referee: Miguel Ángel Chacón

February 12, 2012 Round 6	UNAM	0–2	Puebla	Estadio Olímpico Universitario, Mexico City
12:00	Bravo (yellow card) 14'; M. Palacios (yellow card) 56' (yellow-red card) 63'	Report	Landín 5'; Pozos (yellow card) 22'; Luis García 67'	Referee: Marco Antonio Rodríguez

February 19, 2012 Round 7	Puebla	1–2	Morelia	Estadio Cuauhtémoc, Puebla
16:00	Landín (yellow card) 22'; Luis García (yellow card) 30'; Salinas 52'; Wila (yellow card) 78'; Durán (yellow card) 83'	Report	Aldrete (yellow card) 66'; Sabah 72'; Sandoval 85'; Lozano (yellow card) 86'	Referee: Jorge Isaac Rojas

February 25, 2012 Round 8	Monterrey	2–1	Puebla	Estadio Tecnológico, Monterrey
17:00	Suazo 5' de Nigris 51'; Carreño (yellow card) 90'	Report	Silva 37'; Zamora (yellow card) 63'; Pineda (yellow card) 70'; Wila (yellow card) 90+1'; Martínez (yellow card) 90+3'	Referee: Óscar Macias

March 4, 2012 Round 9	Puebla	1–2	Guadalajara	Estadio Cuauhtémoc, Puebla
12:00	Juárez (yellow card) 22' (yellow-red card) 54'; Luis García 45'; Zamora (yellow card) 67'; Lacerda (yellow card) 70'; Álvarez (yellow card) 90'; Pozos (yellow card) 90+3'	Report	Magallón (yellow card) 34'; Reynoso 51' (pen.); Enriquez 60'; Torres (yellow card) 90'; Fabián (yellow card) 90+1'	Referee: Roberto García Orozco

March 10, 2012 Round 10	Santos Laguna	3–1	Puebla	Estadio TSM Corona, Torreón
19:00	Gómez 48', 90+2'; Suárez (yellow card) 37'; Peralta 71'	Report	Luis García (yellow card) 40'; Beasley 43'; Cervantes (yellow card) 53'; Durán (yellow card) 69'	Referee: Ricardo Arellano

March 18, 2012 Round 11	Puebla	0–1	San Luis	Estadio Cuauhtémoc, Puebla
12:00	Juárez (yellow card) 16'; Zamora (yellow card) 42'; Polo (red card) 64'; Landín (yellow card) 67'; Lacerda (yellow card) 70'	Report	Orozco (yellow card) 12'; Torres (yellow card) 29'; Aguirre 71' (pen.); Velasco (yellow card) 73'	Referee: Mauricio Morales

March 25, 2012 Round 12	Puebla	1–1	Cruz Azul	Estadio Cuauhtémoc, Puebla
12:00	Lacerda (yellow card) 49'; Beasley 56', (yellow card) 67'; Juárez (yellow card) 90+1'	Report	Villa 10', (red card) 85'	Referee: Francisco Chacón

March 31, 2012 Round 13	Querétaro	0–1	Puebla	Estadio Corregidora, Querétaro
17:00	López 42'; Cortés (yellow card) 83'; López (yellow card) 86'; Oviedo (yellow card) 90'	Report	Zamora (yellow card) 35'; Durán (yellow card) 65'; Silva 68'	Referee: José Alfredo Peñaloza

April 8, 2012 Round 14	Puebla	2–1	Toluca	Estadio Cuauhtémoc, Puebla
12:00	Beasley 51'; Padilla 83', (yellow card) 84'; Salinas (yellow card) 90+1'	Report	Torres 30'; Talavera (yellow card) 90'; Calderón (red card) 90+2'	Referee: Fabricio Morales

April 13, 2012 Round 15	Estudiantes Tecos	1–1	Puebla	Estadio Tres de Marzo, Zapopan
20:10	Sambueza (yellow card) 10', (goal) 87'; Luna (yellow card) 69'	Report	Silva 7'; Zamora (yellow card) 16'; Landín (yellow card) 47'; Álvarez (yellow card) 59'; Pineda (yellow card) 63'; Salinas (yellow card) 88'	Referee: Erim Ramírez

April 22, 2012 Round 16	Puebla	2–3	América	Estadio Cuauhtémoc, Puebla
16:00	Luis García 24'; Durán (yellow card) 27'; Beasley 48'; Salinas (yellow card) 90+3'	Report	Montenegro 6'; Vizcarrondo (yellow card) 28'; Benítez (yellow card) 42', (goal) 86' (pen.); Pinedo 48' (o.g.)	Referee: Ricardo Arellano

April 28, 2012 Round 17	UANL	1–2	Puebla	Estadio Universitario, San Nicolás
19:00	Lobos 33'	Report	Polo (yellow card) 35'; Luis García 83'; Padilla 88'	Referee: Marco Antonio Rodríguez

Puebla did not qualify to the Final Phase

=== Goalscorers ===
Position	Nation	Name	Goals scored
1.	(Spain)	Luis García	6
2.	(United States)	DaMarcus Beasley	5
3.	(Brazil)	Lucas Silva	3
4.	(Mexico)	Luis Ángel Landín	2
4.	(Mexico)	Aarón Padilla	2
6.	(Mexico)	Rodrigo Salinas	1
TOTAL			19

=== Results ===
==== Results summary ====
Overall								Home						Away					
Pld	W	D	L	GF	GA	GD	Pts	W	D	L	GF	GA	GD	W	D	L	GF	GA	GD
17	5	4	8	19	23	−4	19	1	3	5	9	13	−4	4	1	3	10	10	0

Last updated: 28 April 2012.
Source: Clausura 2012 results

==== Results by round ====
Round	1	2	3	4	5	6	7	8	9	10	11	12	13	14	15	16	17
Ground	H	A	H	A	H	A	H	A	H	A	H	H	A	H	A	H	A
Result	D	L	L	W	D	W	L	L	L	L	L	D	L	W	D	L	W
Position	12	13	15	14	13	11	11	13	14	15	16	16	15	11	12	12	12

Updated to match(es) played on 29 April 2012. Source: Clausura 2012 results and mediotiempo.com
A = Away; H = Home; W = Win; D = Draw; L = Loss
