= List of Mexican football transfers summer 2011 =

This is a list of Mexican football transfers in the Mexican Primera Division during the summer 2011 transfer window, grouped by club. Football has been played professionally in Mexico since the early 1900s. Since 1996, the country has played two split seasons instead of a traditional long season. There are two separate playoff and league divisions. After many years of calling the regular seasons as "Verano" (Summer) and "Invierno" (Winter); the Primera División de México (Mexican First League Division) have changed the names of the competition, and has opted for "Apertura" (opening) and "Clausura" (closing) events. The Apertura division begins in the middle of Mexico's summer and ends before the official start of winter. The Clausura division begins during the New Year, and concludes in the spring season.

== Mexican Primera División ==
=== América ===
In: Note: Flags indicate national team as defined under FIFA eligibility rules; some limited exceptions apply. Players may hold more than one non-FIFA nationality.

No.	Pos.	Nation	Player
2	DF	MEX	Ismael Rodríguez (loan return from Querétaro)
5	DF	MEX	Jesús Molina (from Tigres)
11	FW	ECU	Christian Benítez (from Santos)
16	MF	MEX	Isaac Acuña (loan return from Querétaro)
20	GK	MEX	Leonín Pineda (loan return from Tijuana)
22	DF	MEX	Paul Aguilar (from Pachuca)
26	MF	MEX	Juan Carlos Medina (loan return from San Luis)

Out: Note: Flags indicate national team as defined under FIFA eligibility rules; some limited exceptions apply. Players may hold more than one non-FIFA nationality.

No.	Pos.	Nation	Player
1	GK	MEX	Guillermo Ochoa (to (France) Ajaccio)
9	FW	MEX	Enrique Esqueda (to Pachuca)
13	MF	MEX	Pável Pardo (to (United States) Chicago Fire)
16	DF	MEX	Diego Cervantes (on loan to Puebla)
27	FW	MEX	Tony López (on loan to Puebla)
--	DF	MEX	Guillermo Cerda (on loan to San Luis, previously on loan at Puebla)
--	DF	MEX	Lampros Kontogiannis (to Tigres, previously on loan at Orizaba)
--	MF	MEX	Juan Carlos Silva (to Pachuca, previously on loan at Necaxa)

=== Atlante ===
In: Note: Flags indicate national team as defined under FIFA eligibility rules; some limited exceptions apply. Players may hold more than one non-FIFA nationality.

No.	Pos.	Nation	Player
6	MF	MEX	Óscar Vera (on loan from Atlas, previously on loan at U. de G.)
7	FW	ARG	Juan Cuevas (on loan from Toluca, previously on loan at San Luis)
10	MF	PAR	Osvaldo Martínez (from Monterrey)
14	FW	MEX	Francisco Fonseca (from Tigres, previously on loan)
16	FW	MEX	Óscar Rojas (on loan from UNAM)
33	MF	ARG	Matías Córdoba (on loan from (Argentina) Argentinos Juniors, previously on loan at (Argentina) San Martín de Tucumán)

Out: Note: Flags indicate national team as defined under FIFA eligibility rules; some limited exceptions apply. Players may hold more than one non-FIFA nationality.

No.	Pos.	Nation	Player
7	MF	MEX	Fernando Navarro (to Tigres)
--	GK	MEX	Gerardo Daniel Ruiz (on loan to Chiapas, previously on loan)
--	DF	ARG	Miguel Ángel Martínez (to Chiapas, previously on loan)
--	DF	MEX	Diego García (on loan to Querétaro, previously on loan at Neza)
--	MF	MEX	José Joel González (on loan to San Luis, previously on loan at Puebla)

=== Atlas ===
In: Note: Flags indicate national team as defined under FIFA eligibility rules; some limited exceptions apply. Players may hold more than one non-FIFA nationality.

No.	Pos.	Nation	Player
2	DF	URU	Jonathan Lacerda (on loan from Santos)
6	MF	MEX	Francisco Torres (on loan from Santos, previously on loan at Chiapas)
10	MF	VEN	Jesús Meza (from (Venezuela) Zamora)
11	FW	URU	Gastón Puerari (from (United States) Chicago Fire)
13	FW	HON	Georgie Welcome (on loan from (Honduras) Motagua, previously on loan at (France) AS Monaco)
14	FW	MEX	Mauricio Romero (from Veracruz)
22	MF	MEX	Guillermo Rojas (on loan from Chiapas)

Out: Note: Flags indicate national team as defined under FIFA eligibility rules; some limited exceptions apply. Players may hold more than one non-FIFA nationality.

No.	Pos.	Nation	Player
6	MF	MEX	Gerardo Espinoza (to Chiapas)
10	FW	ARG	Alfredo Moreno (loan return to San Luis)
11	FW	MEX	Daniel Osorno (to Puebla)
13	FW	HON	Carlo Costly (on loan to (United States) Houston Dynamo)
15	MF	MEX	Gerardo Flores (to Cruz Azul)
22	MF	MEX	Edgar Pacheco (to Tigres)
30	DF	MEX	Dárvin Chávez (to Monterrey)
38	DF	MEX	César Ibáñez (on loan to Santos)
--	DF	MEX	Francisco Giovanni León (on loan to Puebla, unregistered)
--	DF	MEX	Christian Sánchez (on loan to San Luis, previously on loan)
--	MF	MEX	Diego Campos (on loan to Puebla, unregistered)
--	MF	MEX	Óscar Vera (on loan to Atlante, previously on loan at U. de G.)

=== Chiapas ===
In: Note: Flags indicate national team as defined under FIFA eligibility rules; some limited exceptions apply. Players may hold more than one non-FIFA nationality.

No.	Pos.	Nation	Player
2	DF	ARG	Miguel Ángel Martínez (from Atlante, previous on loan)
6	MF	MEX	Gerardo Espinoza (from Atlas)
8	DF	MEX	Orlando Rincón (from Puebla)
11	FW	COL	Luis Gabriel Rey (on loan from Morelia)
20	FW	COL	Franco Arizala (from Pachuca)
21	GK	MEX	Gerardo Daniel Ruiz (on loan from Atlante, previously on loan)
23	GK	MEX	Édgar Hernández (loan return from Puebla)
30	FW	USA	Gustavo Ruelas (on loan from Santos Laguna)
35	DF	MEX	Jesus Castillo (on loan to Morelia, previously on loan from Neza)

Out: Note: Flags indicate national team as defined under FIFA eligibility rules; some limited exceptions apply. Players may hold more than one non-FIFA nationality.

No.	Pos.	Nation	Player
1	GK	MEX	Jorge Villalpando (to Toluca)
8	MF	MEX	Alan Zamora (to Puebla)
10	MF	ARG	Damián Manso (to Morelia)
11	MF	MEX	Guillermo Rojas (on loan to Atlas)
23	FW	MEX	Antonio Salazar (loan return to Guadalajara)
--	DF	MEX	Jaime Durán (to Puebla, previously on loan at Morelia)

=== Cruz Azul ===
In: Note: Flags indicate national team as defined under FIFA eligibility rules; some limited exceptions apply. Players may hold more than one non-FIFA nationality.

No.	Pos.	Nation	Player
8	MF	MEX	Israel Castro (from UNAM)
9	FW	COL	Edixon Perea (from (Spain) Las Palmas)
15	MF	MEX	Gerardo Flores (from Atlas)

Out: Note: Flags indicate national team as defined under FIFA eligibility rules; some limited exceptions apply. Players may hold more than one non-FIFA nationality.

No.	Pos.	Nation	Player
3	MF	URU	Marcelo Palau (released)
8	MF	MEX	Gonzalo Pineda (to Puebla)
9	FW	MEX	Isaac Romo (on loan to Puebla)
15	DF	MEX	Horacio Cervantes (on loan to Pachuca)
16	DF	MEX	Rogelio Chávez (on loan to Pachuca)
--	DF	MEX	Joel Huiqui (on loan to Morelia, previously on loan)
--	MF	MEX	Édgar Lugo (on loan to Morelia, previously on loan at Puebla)
--	MF	MEX	Jaime Lozano (on loan to Morelia, previously on loan)
--	MF	MEX	Cesáreo Victorino (on loan to Puebla, previously on loan at BUAP)
--	MF	MEX	Israel López (on loan to Querétaro, previously on loan at Tecos)

=== Guadalajara ===
In: Note: Flags indicate national team as defined under FIFA eligibility rules; some limited exceptions apply. Players may hold more than one non-FIFA nationality.

No.	Pos.	Nation	Player
3	DF	MEX	Arturo Ledesma (from Necaxa)
11	MF	MEX	Julio Nava (loan return from Querétaro)
21	FW	MEX	Antonio Salazar (loan return from Chiapas)

Out: Note: Flags indicate national team as defined under FIFA eligibility rules; some limited exceptions apply. Players may hold more than one non-FIFA nationality.

No.	Pos.	Nation	Player
3	DF	MEX	Dionicio Escalante (on loan to Pachuca)
7	FW	MEX	Adolfo Bautista (to Querétaro)
15	FW	MEX	Michel Vázquez (to Querétaro)
21	DF	MEX	Christian Pérez (on loan to Querétaro)
31	FW	MEX	Mitchel Oviedo (to Querétaro)
--	GK	MEX	Liborio Sánchez (on loan to Querétaro, previously on loan at Veracruz)
--	DF	MEX	Aarón Galindo (unregistered, to Santos)
--	DF	MEX	Juan Ocampo (to Querétaro, previously on loan)
--	MF	MEX	Gonzalo Pineda (on loan to Puebla, previously on loan at Cruz Azul)
--	MF	MEX	Sergio Ponce (on loan to Querétaro, previously on loan at San Luis)
--	MF	MEX	Edgar Solís (to Morelia, previously on loan at Atlante)

=== Monterrey ===
In: Note: Flags indicate national team as defined under FIFA eligibility rules; some limited exceptions apply. Players may hold more than one non-FIFA nationality.

No.	Pos.	Nation	Player
5	DF	MEX	Dárvin Chávez (from Atlas)
19	FW	ARG	César Delgado (from (France) Lyon)

Out: Note: Flags indicate national team as defined under FIFA eligibility rules; some limited exceptions apply. Players may hold more than one non-FIFA nationality.

No.	Pos.	Nation	Player
5	DF	MEX	Duilio Davino (to Tecos)
10	MF	PAR	Osvaldo Martínez (to Atlante)
--	GK	MEX	Chrístian Martínez (to Tecos, previously on loan)
--	MF	URU	Egidio Arévalo (to Tijuana, previously on loan at (Brazil) Botafogo)
--	MF	MEX	Manuel Pérez (on loan to Morelia, previously on loan)
--	MF	MEX	Alejandro Molina (on loan to Tijuana, previously on loan)
--	FW	BRA	Robert de Pinho (on loan to (Brazil) Bahia, previously on loan at Cruzeiro)

=== Morelia ===
In: Note: Flags indicate national team as defined under FIFA eligibility rules; some limited exceptions apply. Players may hold more than one non-FIFA nationality.

No.	Pos.	Nation	Player
4	MF	MEX	Felipe Ayala (on loan from Puebla)
13	MF	MEX	Manuel Pérez (on loan from Monterrey, previously on loan)
18	MF	ARG	Damián Manso (from Chiapas)
21	MF	MEX	Jaime Lozano (on loan from Cruz Azul, previously on loan)
22	DF	MEX	Diego Jiménez (on loan from Tecos)
33	DF	MEX	Joel Huiqui (from Cruz Azul, previously on loan)
35	MF	MEX	Édgar Lugo (on loan from Cruz Azul, previously on loan at Puebla)

Out: Note: Flags indicate national team as defined under FIFA eligibility rules; some limited exceptions apply. Players may hold more than one non-FIFA nationality.

No.	Pos.	Nation	Player
18	FW	COL	Luis Gabriel Rey (on loan to Chiapas)
77	FW	MEX	Elías Hernández (to Pachuca)
--	DF	MEX	Jaime Durán (to Puebla, previously on loan at Chiapas)
--	DF	MEX	Jesús Castillo (on loan to Chiapas, previously on loan at Neza)

=== Pachuca ===
In: Note: Flags indicate national team as defined under FIFA eligibility rules; some limited exceptions apply. Players may hold more than one non-FIFA nationality.

No.	Pos.	Nation	Player
3	DF	MEX	Dionicio Escalante (on loan from Guadalajara)
5	DF	MEX	Horacio Cervantes (on loan from Cruz Azul)
7	MF	MEX	Elías Hernández (from Morelia)
9	FW	MEX	Enrique Esqueda (from América)
10	MF	ARG	Mauro Cejas (from Tecos)
11	FW	ECU	Félix Borja (from Puebla)
14	MF	ECU	Segundo Castillo (from (Ecuador) Deportivo Quito)
15	MF	MEX	Juan Carlos Silva (from América, previously on loan at Necaxa)
19	MF	MEX	Edy Brambila (loan return from León)
23	FW	ECU	Jaime Ayoví (from Toluca)
25	DF	MEX	Rogelio Chávez (from Cruz Azul)
110	MF	COL	Andrés Chitiva (loan return from Veracruz)

Out: Note: Flags indicate national team as defined under FIFA eligibility rules; some limited exceptions apply. Players may hold more than one non-FIFA nationality.

No.	Pos.	Nation	Player
9	FW	USA	Herculez Gomez (to Tecos)
10	FW	PAR	Edgar Benítez (to (Paraguay) Cerro Porteño)
11	MF	MEX	Braulio Luna (to Tecos)
22	DF	MEX	Paul Aguilar (to América)
25	FW	COL	Franco Arizala (to Chiapas)

=== Puebla ===
In: Note: Flags indicate national team as defined under FIFA eligibility rules; some limited exceptions apply. Players may hold more than one non-FIFA nationality.

No.	Pos.	Nation	Player
1	GK	MEX	Mario Rodríguez (on loan from Tecos)
2	DF	MEX	Aldo Polo (from León)
3	DF	MEX	Obed Rincón (from Necaxa)
4	DF	MEX	Diego Cervantes (on loan from América)
5	DF	MEX	Álvaro Ortiz (from Toluca, previously on loan)
7	MF	MEX	Gonzalo Pineda (on loan from Guadalajara, previously on loan at Cruz Azul)
8	MF	MEX	Alan Zamora (from Chiapas)
9	MF	MEX	Daniel Osorno (from Atlas)
11	MF	USA	DaMarcus Beasley (from (Germany) Hannover 96)
13	FW	MEX	Isaac Romo (on loan from Cruz Azul)
14	MF	ESP	Luis García (from (Greece) Panathinaikos)
16	DF	MEX	Diego Campos (from Atlas)
19	FW	MEX	Tony López (from América)
20	FW	COL	Duvier Riascos (from (Venezuela) Estudiantes de Mérida, previously on loan at (China) Shanghai Shenhua)
21	MF	MEX	Cesáreo Victorino (from Veracruz, previously on loan at Cruz Azul)
25	MF	MEX	Francisco Pizano (from León)
27	MF	MEX	Jaime Durán (from Morelia, previously on loan at Chiapas)
33	GK	MEX	Alexandro Álvarez (from Necaxa, previous on loan)

Out: Note: Flags indicate national team as defined under FIFA eligibility rules; some limited exceptions apply. Players may hold more than one non-FIFA nationality.

No.	Pos.	Nation	Player
2	DF	MEX	Orlando Rincón (to Chiapas)
3	DF	URU	Alejandro Acosta (to Veracruz)
9	FW	ECU	Félix Borja (to Pachuca)
10	MF	ARG	Walter Jiménez (released)
14	MF	MEX	Yasser Corona (to Morelia)
15	MF	MEX	Édgar Lugo (to Morelia)
17	DF	USA	Edgar Castillo (loan return to América)
23	FW	PAR	Nelson Cuevas (to (Paraguay) Cerro Porteño)
30	MF	MEX	Felipe Ayala (on loan to Morelia)
31	DF	MEX	Melvin Brown (to Tecos)

=== Querétaro ===
In: Note: Flags indicate national team as defined under FIFA eligibility rules; some limited exceptions apply. Players may hold more than one non-FIFA nationality.

No.	Pos.	Nation	Player
1	GK	MEX	Liborio Sánchez (on loan from Guadalajara, previously on loan at Veracruz)
3	DF	MEX	Juan Ocampo (from Guadalajara, previously on loan)
4	DF	MEX	Diego García (from Atlante, previously on loan at Neza)
5	MF	MEX	Israel López (from Cruz Azul, previously on loan at Tecos)
6	FW	MEX	Mitchel Oviedo (on loan from Guadalajara)
7	FW	MEX	Adolfo Bautista (from Guadalajara)
8	MF	MEX	Israel Martínez (from América)
9	FW	MEX	Michel Vázquez (on loan from Guadalajara)
16	MF	MEX	Sergio Ponce (on loan from Guadalajara, previously on loan at San Luis)
18	FW	MEX	Pablo Bonells (from León)
22	FW	ARG	Franco Niell (on loan from (Argentina) Argentinos Juniors)
25	FW	COL	Daley Mena (on loan from (Uruguay) Danubio)
27	DF	MEX	Christian Pérez (on loan from Guadalajara)
31	DF	URU	Maximiliano Arias (from (Uruguay) Rampla Juniors)

Out: Note: Flags indicate national team as defined under FIFA eligibility rules; some limited exceptions apply. Players may hold more than one non-FIFA nationality.

No.	Pos.	Nation	Player
5	DF	MEX	Eder Borelli (to Tigres)
16	MF	MEX	Isaac Acuña (loan return to América)

=== San Luis ===
In: Note: Flags indicate national team as defined under FIFA eligibility rules; some limited exceptions apply. Players may hold more than one non-FIFA nationality.

No.	Pos.	Nation	Player
1	GK	MEX	Óscar Pérez (from Necaxa)
4	DF	MEX	Christian Sánchez (from Atlas, previously on loan)
5	MF	MEX	José Joel González (on loan from Atlante, previously on loan at Puebla)
8	MF	MEX	Jehu Chiapas (from UNAM)
11	MF	COL	Macnelly Torres (from (Chile) Colo-Colo, previously on loan at (Colombia) Atlético Nacional)
13	MF	MEX	Moisés Velasco (on loan from Toluca)
15	MF	MEX	Fernando Morales (from UNAM)
22	DF	MEX	Guillermo Cerda (on loan from América, previously on loan at Puebla)
23	FW	ARG	Alfredo Moreno (loan return from Atlas)
--	FW	ARG	Ismael Blanco (from (Greece) AEK Athens)

Out: Note: Flags indicate national team as defined under FIFA eligibility rules; some limited exceptions apply. Players may hold more than one non-FIFA nationality.

No.	Pos.	Nation	Player
8	MF	MEX	Juan Carlos Medina (loan return to América)
11	FW	ARG	Juan Cuevas (to Atlante)
14	DF	MEX	Noé Maya (to Tijuana)
20	DF	MEX	Osmar Mares (loan return to Santos)

=== Santos Laguna ===
In: Note: Flags indicate national team as defined under FIFA eligibility rules; some limited exceptions apply. Players may hold more than one non-FIFA nationality.

No.	Pos.	Nation	Player
3	DF	ARG	Santiago Hoyos (from (Argentina) Lanús)
5	DF	MEX	César Ibáñez (on loan from Atlas)
9	FW	MEX	Carlos Ochoa (loan return from Tigres)
11	FW	ECU	Cristian Suárez (from Necaxa)
14	DF	MEX	Aarón Galindo (from Guadalajara)
20	DF	MEX	Osmar Mares (loan return from San Luis)

Out: Note: Flags indicate national team as defined under FIFA eligibility rules; some limited exceptions apply. Players may hold more than one non-FIFA nationality.

No.	Pos.	Nation	Player
5	MF	MEX	Fernando Arce (to Tijuana)
9	FW	CHI	Rodrigo Ruiz (to Tecos)
11	FW	ECU	Christian Benítez (to América)
14	DF	MEX	Uriel Álvarez (to Puebla)
21	DF	MEX	Juan Pablo Santiago (to Tijuana)
44	FW	USA	Gustavo Ruelas (on loan to Chiapas)
80	DF	URU	Jonathan Lacerda (on loan to Atlas)
--	MF	MEX	Francisco Torres (on loan to Atlas, previously on loan at Chiapas)

=== Tecos ===
In: Note: Flags indicate national team as defined under FIFA eligibility rules; some limited exceptions apply. Players may hold more than one non-FIFA nationality.

No.	Pos.	Nation	Player
1	GK	MEX	Juan Carlos García Rulfo (from Puebla, previously on loan)
4	MF	ARG	Hugo Colace (from (England) Barnsley)
5	DF	MEX	Duilio Davino (from Monterrey)
8	GK	MEX	Chrístian Martínez (from Monterrey, previously on loan)
9	FW	USA	Herculez Gomez (from Pachuca)
10	FW	CHI	Rodrigo Ruiz (from Santos)
11	MF	MEX	Braulio Luna (from Pachuca)
13	DF	MEX	Melvin Brown (from Puebla)
16	FW	USA	Herculez Gomez (from Pachuca)
17	MF	MEX	Juan Carlos García (from Puebla, previously on loan)
21	DF	MEX	Mario Pérez (from Necaxa)
24	DF	ARG	Lucas Bovaglio (from (Argentina) Atlético Rafaela)
30	MF	CHI	Nelson Pinto (loan return from (Chile) Santiago Morning)

Out: Note: Flags indicate national team as defined under FIFA eligibility rules; some limited exceptions apply. Players may hold more than one non-FIFA nationality.

No.	Pos.	Nation	Player
10	MF	ARG	Mauro Cejas (to Pachuca)
21	DF	MEX	Diego Jiménez (on loan to Morelia)
23	GK	MEX	Mario Rodríguez (on loan to Puebla)

=== Tijuana ===
In: Note: Flags indicate national team as defined under FIFA eligibility rules; some limited exceptions apply. Players may hold more than one non-FIFA nationality.

No.	Pos.	Nation	Player
4	DF	MEX	Miguel Almazán (on loan from Toluca, previously on loan)
7	MF	MEX	Leandro Augusto (from UNAM)
8	MF	MEX	Fernando Arce (from Santos)
13	GK	MEX	Cirilo Saucedo (from Tigres)
14	DF	MEX	Noé Maya (from San Luis)
16	MF	URU	Egidio Arévalo (from Monterrey, previously on loan at (Brazil) Botafogo)
17	FW	COL	Dayro Moreno (from (Colombia) Once Caldas)
18	FW	ARG	José Sand (from (United Arab Emirates) Al Ain, previously on loan at (Spain) Deportivo)
21	DF	MEX	Juan Pablo Santiago (from Santos Laguna)
26	MF	MEX	Félix Ángel Ayala (from Tigres, previously on loan)
29	MF	MEX	Armando Pulido (on loan from Tigres, previously on loan)

Out: Note: Flags indicate national team as defined under FIFA eligibility rules; some limited exceptions apply. Players may hold more than one non-FIFA nationality.

No.	Pos.	Nation	Player
25	GK	MEX	Leonín Pineda (loan return to América)

=== Toluca ===
In: Note: Flags indicate national team as defined under FIFA eligibility rules; some limited exceptions apply. Players may hold more than one non-FIFA nationality.

No.	Pos.	Nation	Player
3	GK	MEX	Jorge Villalpando (from Chiapas)
20	DF	PAR	Aureliano Torres (from (Argentina) San Lorenzo)
24	FW	URU	Iván Alonso (from (Spain) Espanyol)

Out: Note: Flags indicate national team as defined under FIFA eligibility rules; some limited exceptions apply. Players may hold more than one non-FIFA nationality.

No.	Pos.	Nation	Player
13	MF	MEX	Moisés Velasco (on loan to San Luis)
22	FW	MEX	Emmanuel Cerda (loan return to Tigres)
23	FW	ECU	Jaime Ayoví (to Pachuca)
--	DF	MEX	Miguel Almazán (on loan to Tijuana, previously on loan)
--	DF	MEX	Álvaro Ortiz (to Puebla, previously on loan)
--	FW	ARG	Juan Cuevas (to Atlante, previously on loan at San Luis)

=== UANL ===
In: Note: Flags indicate national team as defined under FIFA eligibility rules; some limited exceptions apply. Players may hold more than one non-FIFA nationality.

No.	Pos.	Nation	Player
3	DF	MEX	Carlos Salcido (on loan from (England) Fulham)
5	DF	MEX	Eder Borelli (from Querétaro)
14	MF	MEX	Fernando Navarro (from Atlante)
20	FW	MEX	Emmanuel Cerda (loan return from Toluca)
22	MF	MEX	Edgar Pacheco (from Atlas)
23	DF	MEX	Lampros Kontogiannis (from América)

Out: Note: Flags indicate national team as defined under FIFA eligibility rules; some limited exceptions apply. Players may hold more than one non-FIFA nationality.

No.	Pos.	Nation	Player
1	GK	MEX	Cirilo Saucedo (to Tijuana)
5	MF	MEX	Jesús Molina (to América)
20	FW	MEX	Carlos Ochoa (loan return to Santos)
--	MF	MEX	Armando Pulido (on loan to Tijuana, previously on loan)
--	MF	MEX	Félix Ángel Ayala (to Tijuana, previously on loan)
--	FW	MEX	Francisco Fonseca (to Atlante, previously on loan)

=== UNAM ===
In: Note: Flags indicate national team as defined under FIFA eligibility rules; some limited exceptions apply. Players may hold more than one non-FIFA nationality.

No.	Pos.	Nation	Player

Out: Note: Flags indicate national team as defined under FIFA eligibility rules; some limited exceptions apply. Players may hold more than one non-FIFA nationality.

No.	Pos.	Nation	Player
5	MF	MEX	Israel Castro (to Cruz Azul)
7	MF	MEX	Leandro Augusto (to Tijuana)
9	FW	PAR	Dante López (to (Paraguay) Guaraní)
13	MF	MEX	Jehu Chiapas (on loan to San Luis)
18	MF	MEX	Fernando Morales (on loan to San Luis)
19	FW	MEX	Óscar Rojas (to Atlante)
--	MF	MEX	Ismael Íñiguez (on loan to Tijuana, previously on loan at Necaxa)

== See also ==
- 2011–12 Primera División de México season
