= 2012–13 San Luis F.C. season =

San Luis
2012–13 season
- Chairman: José Romano
- Manager: José Luis Trejo (until Aug. 27, 2012); Alex Aguinaga (interim) (Aug. 27, 2012–Nov. 15, 2012); Eduardo Fentanes (Nov. 20, 2012–Feb. 18, 2013); Carlos María Morales (February 19, 2013–March 12, 2013); Gerardo Silva (interim) (from March 12, 2013)
- Stadium: Estadio Alfonso Lastras
- Apertura 2012: 15th
- Clausura 2013: 16th
- Copa MX (Apertura): Semi-finals
- Copa MX (Clausura): Group stage
- Top goalscorer: League: Apertura: Sebastián Fernández; Noé Maya; Luis Ángel Mendoza; Santiago Tréllez (2); Clausura: Mauro Matos (3); All: Santiago Tréllez (7)
- Highest home attendance: Apertura: 13,071 vs Guadalajara (August 18, 2012); Clausura: 25,418 vs UANL (March 9, 2013)
- Lowest home attendance: Apertura: 7,572 vs Toluca (November 5, 2012); Clausura: 6,847 vs Puebla (February 9, 2013)
| Home colours | Third colours |

The 2012–13 San Luis season was the 66th professional season of Mexico's top-flight football league. The season is split into two tournaments—the Torneo Apertura and the Torneo Clausura—each with identical formats and each contested by the same eighteen teams. San Luis began their season on July 21, 2012 against Santos Laguna, San Luis played most of their homes games on Saturdays at 9:00pm local time. San Luis did not qualify to the final phase in either the Apertura or Clausura tournament.

== Torneo Apertura ==
Note: Flags indicate national team as defined under FIFA eligibility rules; some limited exceptions apply. Players may hold more than one non-FIFA nationality.

| No. | Pos. | Nation | Player |
|---|---|---|---|
| 1 | GK | MEX | Óscar Pérez |
| 2 | DF | COL | Andres Cadavid |
| 3 | DF | MEX | César Armando Saldivar |
| 4 | DF | MEX | Marco Iván Pérez |
| 5 | DF | BRA | Everton Bilher |
| 6 | MF | MEX | Jaime Correa |
| 7 | MF | MEX | Moisés Velasco |
| 8 | FW | URU | Sebastián Fernández |
| 9 | FW | COL | Santiago Tréllez |
| 10 | FW | PER | Wilmer Aguirre |
| 12 | GK | MEX | César Lozano |
| 13 | MF | MEX | William Paredes |
| 14 | MF | MEX | César Villaluz |
| 16 | DF | USA | Michael Orozco Fiscal |
| 17 | DF | MEX | Guillermo Rojas |
| 18 | DF | MEX | Isaí Arredondo |
| 19 | MF | MEX | Emilio López Navarro |

| No. | Pos. | Nation | Player |
|---|---|---|---|
| 20 | DF | MEX | Félix de Jesús Araujo Razo |
| 21 | MF | MEX | Noé Maya |
| 22 | FW | MEX | Emmanuel Cerda |
| 23 | MF | MEX | Juan Carlos Silva |
| 24 | MF | MEX | Luis Alfonso Rodríguez |
| 25 | GK | MEX | Carlos Alberto Trejo |
| 26 | FW | MEX | Luis Ángel Mendoza Escamilla |
| 27 | DF | MEX | Diego Ordaz |
| 28 | FW | MEX | Erick Esparza Montemayor |
| 29 | FW | MEX | David Alejandro Salazar Zepeda |
| 30 | FW | MEX | Juan Jonathan García Díaz |
| 31 | DF | MEX | José Pablo Díaz Ruíz |
| 33 | DF | MEX | José Antonio Castro |
| 38 | MF | MEX | Ricardo Balderas Ortiz |
| 39 | DF | MEX | José de Jesús Saavedra Ruíz |
| 40 | MF | MEX | Moisés Elías Ramos Martínez |
| 60 | MF | MEX | Adrián Marín Lugo |

=== Regular season ===
Win Draw Loss

==== Apertura 2012 results ====
| July 21, 2012 Round 1 | Santos Laguna | 2 – 1 | San Luis | Torreón, Coahuila |
| 19:00 | Quintero 3'; Suárez (yellow card) 20'; Mares (yellow card) 51'; Gómez 72' | Report | López 1'; Velasco (yellow card) 27'; Paredes (yellow card) 89' | Stadium: Estadio Corona; Referee: Miguel Ángel Ayala |

| July 28, 2012 Round 2 | San Luis | 1 – 2 | Cruz Azul | San Luis Potosí, San Luis Potosí |
| 21:00 | Cadavid (yellow card) 45+'; Orozco 54'; Tréllez (yellow card) 67' | Report | Pavone 16'; A. Castro (yellow card) 30'; Orozco 83' | Stadium: Estadio Alfonso Lastras; Referee: Óscar Macias |

| August 3, 2012 Round 3 | Morelia | 3 – 3 | San Luis | Morelia, Michoacán |
| 21:30 | Huiqui 9', 88', (yellow card) 39'; Morales (yellow card) 28'; Ramírez (yellow card) 38'; Pedroza 85' | Report | Velasco (yellow card) 37'; Cadavid (yellow card) 39'; Fernández 45', 52' (pen.), (yellow card) 47'; Tréllez 65' | Stadium: Estadio Morelos; Attendance: 11,962; Referee: Ricardo Arellano |

| August 11, 2012 Round 4 | San Luis | 1 – 1 | Monterrey | San Luis Potosí, San Luis Potosí |
| 21:00 | Paredes (yellow card) 5'; Rodríguez 48'; Fernández (yellow card) 49'; Velasco (yellow card) 70'; Cadavid (yellow card) 89' | Report | Suazo 9', (yellow card) 65'; Delgado (red card) 65' | Stadium: Estadio Alfonso Lastras; Attendance: 10,013; Referee: Fernando Guerrero |

| August 18, 2012 Round 5 | San Luis | 0 – 1 | Guadalajara | San Luis Potosí, San Luis Potosí |
| 21:00 | Fernández (yellow card) 16'; Orozco (yellow card) 33'; Velasco (yellow card) 68'; Mendoza (yellow card) 68'; Correa (yellow card) 84' | Report | Arellano (yellow card) 47'; Ponce (yellow card) 83'; Fierro 82' | Stadium: Estadio Alfonso Lastras; Attendance: 13,071; Referee: Jorge Antonio Pérez |

| August 26, 2012 Round 6 | Puebla | 1 – 0 | San Luis | Puebla, Puebla |
| 12:00 | de Buen 2'; García (yellow card) 19'; Romo (yellow card) 27'; Martínez (yellow card) 52'; Alustiza (yellow card) 68'; Beasley (yellow card) 72' | Report | Everton Bilher (yellow card) 5'; Correa (yellow card) 53'; Mendoza (yellow card) 65'; Fernández (yellow card) 70' | Stadium: Estadio Cuauhtémoc; Referee: Miguel Ángel Flores |

| September 1, 2012 Round 7 | San Luis | 0 – 2 | León | San Luis Potosí, San Luis Potosí |
| 21:00 | Paredes (yellow card) 85' | Report | Loboa 6'; Britos 76' | Stadium: Estadio Alfonso Lastras; Attendance: 11,554; Referee: Francisco Chacón |

| September 16, 2012 Round 8 | UNAM | 0 – 1 | San Luis | Mexico City |
| 12:00 | Velarde (yellow card) 41'; Espinoza (yellow card) 47'; Bravo (yellow card) 60'; Palacios (yellow card) 63'; Verón (yellow card) 85' | Report | Aguirre (yellow card) 52'; Mendoza 55'; Castro (yellow card) 70' | Stadium: Estadio Olímpico Universitario; Referee: José Alfredo Peñaloza |

| September 22, 2012 Round 9 | San Luis | 1 – 0 | Pachuca | San Luis Potosí, San Luis Potosí |
| 17:00 | Correa 38'; Cadavid (yellow card) 64'; Paredes (yellow card) 72'; Villaluz (yellow card) 88' | Report | Tamudo (yellow card) 47'; Cejas (yellow card) 70'; Vidrio (yellow card) 88' | Stadium: Estadio Alfonso Lastras; Attendance: 8,778; Referee: Miguel Ángel Ayala |

| September 29, 2012 Round 10 | UANL | 0 – 0 | San Luis | San Nicolás de los Garza, Nuevo León |
| 19:00 | Salcido (yellow card) 75'; Ayala (yellow card) 88'; Álvarez (yellow card) 90' | Report | Arredondo (yellow card) 77' | Stadium: Estadio Universitario; Attendance: 38,900; Referee: Miguel Ángel Chacón |

| October 2, 2012 Round 11 | San Luis | 1 – 2 | América | San Luis Potosí, San Luis Potosí |
| 20:30 | Mendoza 70' | Report | Montenegro (yellow card) 22', (goal) 61'; Jiménez (red card) 74'; Medina (yellow card) 85'; Benítez 88'; Bermúdez (yellow card) 90+3' | Stadium: Estadio Alfonso Lastras; Referee: Erim Ramírez |

| October 7, 2012 Round 12 | Chiapas | 4 – 0 | San Luis | Tuxtla Gutiérrez, Chiapas |
| 15:00 | Rey 9', 26'; Córdoba 46', (yellow card) 68'; Arizala 94' | Report | Tréllez (yellow card) 65'; Paredes (yellow card) 69'; Velasco (yellow card) 75' | Stadium: Estadio Victor Manuel Reyna; Referee: Ricardo Arellano |

| October 13, 2012 Round 13 | San Luis | 2 – 2 | Atlante | San Luis Potosí, San Luis Potosí |
| 19:00 | Mendoza 2', (yellow card) 58'; Maya 60', (yellow card) 61' | Report | Guerrero (yellow card) 58'; Amione 82', 90+2', (yellow card) 90+2'; Venegas (yellow card) 90+1'; Arochi (yellow card) 90+3' | Stadium: Estadio Alfonso Lastras; Attendance: 8,220; Referee: Óscar Macias |

| October 20, 2012 Round 14 | Atlas | 2 – 3 | San Luis | Guadalajara, Jalisco |
| 21:00 | Mancilla 24'; Robles (yellow card) 39'; Sandoval (yellow card) 57'; Erpen 65', (yellow card) 89'; Pinto (yellow card) 67' | Report | Orozco (yellow card) 28'; Cerda 46'; Erpen 52' (o.g.); Arredondo (yellow card) 53'; López (yellow card) 57'; Velasco (yellow card) 72'; Tréllez 82' | Stadium: Estadio Jalisco; Attendance: 20,622; Referee: Jorge Antonio Pérez |

| October 27, 2012 Round 15 | San Luis | 0 – 0 | Querétaro | San Luis Potosí, San Luis Potosí |
| 17:00 | Everton (yellow card) 46'; Arredondo (yellow card) 51' (yellow-red card) 89'; Cadavid (yellow card) 86'; Tréllez (yellow card) 90+3' | Report | | Stadium: Estadio Alfonso Lastras; Attendance: 11,977; Referee: Marco Antonio Rodríguez |

| November 2, 2012 Round 16 | Tijuana | 0 – 0 | San Luis | Tijuana, Baja California |
| 19:30 | Pellerano (yellow card) 63'; Leandro (yellow card) 88'; Aguilar (yellow card) 90+1' | Report | Everton (yellow card) 14'; Cadavid (yellow card) 25'; Correa (yellow card) 58'; Pérez (yellow card) 75'; Velasco (yellow card) 90+1' | Stadium: Estadio Caliente; Attendance: 22,189; Referee: Fernando Guerrero |

| October 27, 2012 Round 17 | San Luis | 0 – 2 | Toluca | San Luis Potosí, San Luis Potosí |
| 21:00 | | Report | Rodríguez 65'; Tejada 73' | Stadium: Estadio Alfonso Lastras; Attendance: 7,572; Referee: Ricardo Arellano |

=== Goalscorers ===
| Position | Nation | Name | Goals scored |
|---|---|---|---|
| 1. | (Uruguay) | Sebastián Fernández | 2 |
| 1. | (Mexico) | Noé Maya | 2 |
| 1. | (Mexico) | Luis Ángel Mendoza | 2 |
| 1. | (Colombia) | Santiago Tréllez | 2 |
| 5. | (Mexico) | Emmanuel Cerda | 1 |
| 5. | (Mexico) | Jaime Correa | 1 |
| 5. | (Mexico) | Emilio López | 1 |
| 5. | (United States) | Michael Orozco | 1 |
| 5. | (Mexico) | Luis Alfonso Rodríguez | 1 |
| 5. | | Own Goals | 1 |
| TOTAL | | | 14 |

=== Results ===
==== Results summary ====
| Overall | | | | | | | | Home | | | | | | Away | | | | | |
| Pld | W | D | L | GF | GA | GD | Pts | W | D | L | GF | GA | GD | W | D | L | GF | GA | GD |
|---|---|---|---|---|---|---|---|---|---|---|---|---|---|---|---|---|---|---|---|
| 17 | 3 | 6 | 8 | 14 | 24 | −10 | 15 | 1 | 3 | 5 | 6 | 12 | −6 | 2 | 3 | 3 | 8 | 12 | −4 |

Last updated: 10 November 2012.
Source: Apertura 2012 results

==== Results by round ====
| Round | 1 | 2 | 3 | 4 | 5 | 6 | 7 | 8 | 9 | 10 | 11 | 12 | 13 | 14 | 15 | 16 | 17 |
|---|---|---|---|---|---|---|---|---|---|---|---|---|---|---|---|---|---|
| Ground | A | H | A | H | H | A | H | A | H | A | H | A | H | A | H | A | H |
| Result | L | L | D | D | L | L | L | W | W | D | L | L | D | W | D | D | L |
| Position | 14 | 14 | 14 | 14 | 15 | 17 | 17 | 16 | 15 | 16 | 16 | 17 | 17 | 15 | 15 | 15 | 15 |

Updated to match(es) played on 11 November 2012. Source: Apertura 2012 results and mediotiempo.com
A = Away; H = Home; W = Win; D = Draw; L = Loss

== Apertura 2012 Copa MX ==
=== Group stage ===
Win Draw Loss

==== Apertura results ====
| July 25, 2012 1 | Pumas Morelos | 1 – 2 | San Luis | Cuernavaca, Morelos |
| 16:00 | Campos 30'; Saldivar (yellow card) 67'; Mendoza (yellow card) 69' | Report | Mendoza 19'; Silva 44'; Maya (yellow card) 74'; Everton Bilher (red card) 90+3' | Stadium: Estadio Centenario; Referee: Eduardo Galván |

| July 31, 2012 2 | San Luis | 2 – 0 | Pumas Morelos | San Luis Potosí, San Luis Potosí |
| 21:00 | Tréllez 61', 65'; Silva (red card) 86' | Report | Barrón (yellow card) 34' | Stadium: Estadio Alfonso Lastras; Referee: Luis Enrique Santander |

| August 7, 2012 3 | San Luis | 1 – 1 | Necaxa | San Luis Potosí, San Luis Potosí |
| 21:00 | Cadavid (yellow card) 49' (yellow-red card) 67'; Tréllez 72'; Maya (yellow card) 82'; Saldivar (yellow card) 90+1' | Report | Mosqueda (yellow card) 41'; Cervantes 53' | Stadium: Estadio Alfonso Lastras; Attendance: 6,676; Referee: César A. Ramos |

| August 21, 2012 4 | Necaxa | 1 – 0 | San Luis | Aguascalientes, Aguascalientes |
| 21:00 | Hernández (yellow card) 32'; Márquez (yellow card) 38', (goal) 46'; Pérez (yellow card) 66'; Castillo (red card) 90+1' | Report | Rojas (yellow card) 50'; Rodríguez (yellow card) 70' | Stadium: Estadio Victoria; Attendance: 5,220; Referee: Quetzalli Alvarado Godínez |

| August 28, 2012 5 | San Luis | 2 – 1 | Chiapas | San Luis Potosí, San Luis Potosí |
| 21:00 | Paredes (yellow card) 12'; Cerda 14'; Ordaz 33'; Salazar (yellow card) 85' | Report | Zamora (yellow card) 3'; Zárate 34', (yellow card) 54' | Stadium: Estadio Alfonso Lastras; Attendance: 3,919; Referee: Antony Zanjuampa |

| September 19, 2012 6 | Chiapas | 1 – 1 | San Luis | Tuxtla Gutiérrez, Chiapas |
| 19:00 | Corona 55'; Noriega (yellow card) 74' | Report | Villaluz 90+4' | Stadium: Estadio Victor Manuel Reyna; Referee: César Arturo Ramos |

=== Knockout stage ===
| September 25, 2012 Quarter-finals | Dorados | 3 – 2 | San Luis | Culiacán, Sinaloa |
| 20:00 | Mena 3'; Hernández 6', 15'; Castro (yellow card) 49'; Blanco (yellow card) 61'; Frausto (yellow card) 68'; Folle (yellow card) 90' | Report | Silva (yellow card) 6'; Maya (yellow card) 21'; Orozco (yellow card) 45+'; Cerda (yellow card) 48'; Ordaz 50'; Rojas 57' | Stadium: Estadio Banorte; Attendance: 15,213; Referee: Baruch Absalón Castellanos |

=== Goalscorers ===
| Position | Nation | Name | Goals scored |
|---|---|---|---|
| 1. | (Colombia) | Santiago Tréllez | 3 |
| 2. | (Mexico) | Diego Ordaz | 2 |
| 3. | (Mexico) | Emmanuel Cerda | 1 |
| 3. | (Mexico) | Luis Mendoza | 1 |
| 3. | (Mexico) | Guillermo Rojas | 1 |
| 3. | (Mexico) | Juan Carlos Silva | 1 |
| 3. | (Mexico) | César Villaluz | 1 |
| TOTAL | | | 10 |

=== Results ===
==== Results by round ====
| Round | 1 | 2 | 3 | 4 | 5 | 6 |
|---|---|---|---|---|---|---|
| Ground | A | H | H | A | H | A |
| Result | W | W | D | L | W | D |
| Position | 1 | 1 | 1 | 2 | 2 | 2 |

Updated to match(es) played on 19 September 2012. Source: Apertura results and mediotiempo.com
A = Away; H = Home; W = Win; D = Draw; L = Loss

== Torneo Clausura ==
=== Squad ===
Note: Flags indicate national team as defined under FIFA eligibility rules; some limited exceptions apply. Players may hold more than one non-FIFA nationality.

| No. | Pos. | Nation | Player |
|---|---|---|---|
| 1 | GK | MEX | Óscar Pérez (captain) |
| 2 | DF | ARG | Javier Muñoz Mustafá (vice-captain) |
| 3 | DF | MEX | Mario Méndez |
| 4 | DF | MEX | Marco Iván Pérez |
| 5 | MF | COL | Jhersson Córdoba |
| 6 | DF | MEX | Omar Esparza |
| 7 | MF | MEX | Moisés Velasco |
| 8 | MF | MEX | Alan Zamora |
| 9 | FW | COL | Santiago Tréllez |
| 10 | FW | ARG | Mauro Matos |
| 11 | MF | ARG | Juan Cuevas |
| 12 | GK | MEX | César Lozano |
| 13 | DF | MEX | Yasser Corona |
| 14 | MF | MEX | César Villaluz |
| 15 | FW | MEX | Mario Ortiz |
| 16 | MF | MEX | Francisco Acuña |

| No. | Pos. | Nation | Player |
|---|---|---|---|
| 17 | MF | MEX | Guillermo Rojas |
| 18 | MF | MEX | Isaí Arredondo |
| 19 | MF | MEX | Emilio López |
| 20 | DF | MEX | Félix Araujo |
| 21 | DF | MEX | Ricardo Jiménez |
| 22 | DF | MEX | Álvaro Ortiz |
| 23 | DF | MEX | Orlando Rincón |
| 24 | MF | MEX | Luis Rodríguez |
| 25 | GK | MEX | Carlos Trejo |
| 26 | FW | MEX | Luis Ángel Mendoza |
| 29 | FW | MEX | David Salazar |
| 30 | FW | MEX | Jonathan García |
| 31 | MF | MEX | José Pablo Díaz |
| 38 | DF | MEX | Ricardo Balderas |
| 59 | DF | MEX | Mario Valdez |
| 60 | MF | MEX | Adrián Marín |

=== Regular season ===
Win Draw Loss

==== Clausura 2013 results ====
| January 5, 2013 Round 1 | San Luis | 1 – 1 | Santos Laguna | San Luis Potosí, San Luis Potosí |
| 21:00 | Tréllez (yellow card) 29'; Rojas 66'; Jiménez (yellow card) 67'; Muñoz Mustafá (yellow card) 68' (yellow-red card) 79'; Velasco (yellow card) 75' | Report | Gómez 26'; Mares (yellow card) 29'; Baloy (yellow card) 89'; Figueroa (red card) 90+2' | Stadium: Estadio Alfonso Lastras; Attendance: 8,960; Referee: Miguel Ángel Ortega |

| January 12, 2013 Round 2 | Cruz Azul | 2 – 1 | San Luis | Benito Juárez, Mexico City |
| 17:00 | Giménez 54', 69'; Domínguez (yellow card) 78'; Flores (yellow card) 90+1' | Report | Zamora (yellow card) 19'; Velasco (yellow card) 29'; Tréllez 48'; Araujo (yellow card) 51' | Stadium: Estadio Azul; Attendance: 19,100; Referee: Antony Zanjuampa |

| January 19, 2013 Round 3 | San Luis | 1 – 2 | Morelia | San Luis Potosí, San Luis Potosí |
| 21:00 | Velasco 20'; Rincón (yellow card) 31'; Jiménez (yellow card) 54' | Report | Torres (yellow card) 1'; Huiqui (yellow card) 19' (yellow-red card) 29'; Santana (yellow card) 30'; Pérez 39'; Salinas 55' (pen.) | Stadium: Estadio Alfonso Lastras; Referee: Miguel Ángel Flores |

| January 26, 2013 Round 4 | Monterrey | 3 – 2 | San Luis | Monterrey, Nuevo León |
| 19:00 | López 13' de Nigris 18'; Meza (yellow card) 58'; Suzao (yellow card) 64'; Zavala 76' | Report | Córdoba (yellow card) 11'; Tréllez (yellow card) 40', (goal) 52'; Acuña (yellow card) 58'; Matos 67'; Muñoz Mustafá (yellow card) 79'; Esparza (yellow card) 90+2' | Stadium: Estadio Tecnológico; Attendance: 33,410; Referee: Fernando Guerrero |

| February 3, 2013 Round 5 | Guadalajara | 1 – 1 | San Luis | Zapopan, Jalisco |
| 12:00 | Fabián 23'; Araujo (yellow card) 68'; Reynoso (yellow card) 73' | Report | Muñoz (yellow card) 34'; Matos 54'; Esparza (yellow card) 66'; Mendoza (yellow card) 90' | Stadium: Estadio Omnilife; Attendance: 24,003; Referee: César Arturo Ramos |

| February 9, 2013 Round 6 | San Luis | 1 – 3 | Puebla | San Luis Potosí, San Luis Potosí |
| 21:00 | Zamora (yellow card) 5'; Jiménez 14'; Araujo (yellow card) 72'; Muñoz (yellow card) 76' | Report | Borja 1'; Orozco (yellow card) 16'; Beasley (yellow card) 66', (goal) 81', 88' | Stadium: Estadio Alfonso Lastras; Attendance: 6,847; Referee: Jorge Antonio Pérez |

| February 16, 2013 Round 7 | León | 2 – 0 | San Luis | León, Guanajuato |
| 20:05 | Hernández 13', (yellow card) 23'; Arrechea 62', (yellow card) 81'; Eparza (yellow card) 72'; Pineda (yellow card) 89' | Report | Arredondo (yellow card) 2'; Mendoza (yellow card) 2'; Velasco (yellow card) 38'; Zamora (yellow card) 86' | Stadium: Estadio León; Referee: Paul Delgadillo |

| February 24, 2012 Round 8 | San Luis | 0 – 2 | UNAM | San Luis Potosí, San Luis Potosí |
| 21:00 | Cuevas (yellow card) 37'; Arredondo (yellow card) 39' | Report | Velarde (yellow card) 3'; Ramírez 47'; Cortés 50' | Stadium: Estadio Alfonso Lastras; Attendance: 9,644; Referee: Francisco Chacón |

| March 2, 2013 Round 9 | Pachuca | 2 – 1 | San Luis | Pachuca, Hidalgo |
| 19:00 | Suárez 41'; Reyna 70' da Silva (yellow card) 75' | Report | Velasco (yellow card) 16'; Pérez (yellow card) 50', (goal) 56' | Stadium: Estadio Hidalgo; Attendance: 14,045; Referee: Víctor Bisguerra |

| March 9, 2013 Round 10 | San Luis | 1 – 2 | UANL | San Luis Potosí, San Luis Potosí |
| 21:00 | Corona 24'; Matos (yellow card) 53'; Córdoba (yellow card) 55'; Zamora (red card) 75'; Cuevas (yellow card) 84' | Report | Lobos 11'; Salcido (yellow card) 53'; Luis García 58'; Ayala (yellow card) 62' | Stadium: Estadio Alfonso Lastras; Attendance: 25,418; Referee: José Alfredo Peñaloza |

| March 16, 2013 Round 11 | América | 1 – 1 | San Luis | Coyoacán, Mexico City |
| 17:00 | Medina 40'; Valenzuela (yellow card) 72'; Muñoz (yellow card) 83'; Reyes (red card) 90'; Jiménez (yellow card) 90+3' | Report | Rodríguez (yellow card) 65'; Velasco (yellow card) 66'; Cuevas 90+1' (pen.) | Stadium: Estadio Azteca; Attendance: 22,254; Referee: Roberto García Orozco |

| March 30, 2013 Round 12 | San Luis | 3 – 0 | Chiapas | San Luis Potosí, San Luis Potosí |
| 21:00 | Cuevas 23' (pen.); Muñoz (yellow card) 32', (goal) 61'; Rodríguez (yellow card) 32'; Velasco (yellow card) 61'; Pérez 66' | Report | Jiménez (yellow card) 34' (yellow-red card) 90+2'; Andrade (yellow card) 37'; Gastélum (yellow card) 63'; Esqueda (yellow card) 85' | Stadium: Estadio Alfonso Lastras; Attendance: 21,387; Referee: Jorge Antonio Pérez |

| April 7, 2013 Round 13 | Atlante | 0 – 1 | San Luis | Cancún, Quintana Roo |
| 18:00 | Amione (yellow card) 58' | Report | Corona (yellow card) 27'; López (red card) 41'; Rodríguez (yellow card) 45' (yellow-red card) 82', (goal) 74' | Stadium: Estadio Andrés Quintana Roo; Referee: Jorge Isaac Rojas |

| April 13, 2013 Round 14 | San Luis | 2 – 2 | Atlas | San Luis Potosí, San Luis Potosí |
| 21:00 | Cuevas (yellow card) 17'; Muñoz (yellow card) 36'; Zepeda 77'; Matos 90' | Report | Vuoso 31'; Paganoni (yellow card) 71'; Briuzela 90+3' | Stadium: Estadio Alfonso Lastras; Attendance: 22,496; Referee: César Arturo Ramos |

| April 20, 2013 Round 15 | Querétaro | 2 – 1 | San Luis | Querétaro, Querétaro |
| 17:00 | Escoto 51'; Cosme 87' | Report | Ortiz 23'; Rodríguez (yellow card) 38'; Corona (yellow card) 62'; Pérez (yellow card) 90+4'; Razo (yellow card) 90+4' | Stadium: Estadio Corregidora; Attendance: 12,744; Referee: Marco Antonio Rodríguez |

| April 27, 2013 Round 16 | San Luis | 1 – 0 | Tijuana | San Luis Potosí, San Luis Potosí |
| 21:00 | López (yellow card) 57'; Cuevas (yellow card) 63'; Velasco (yellow card) 76'; Zamora 85' | Report | Almazán (yellow card) 33'; Olsina (red card) 53'; Tahuilán (yellow card) 57'; Núñez (red card) 64' | Stadium: Estadio Alfonso Lastras; Attendance: 19,080; Referee: Fernando Guerrero |

| May 5, 2013 Round 17 | Toluca | 0 – 1 | San Luis | Toluca, Estado de México |
| 12:00 | Wilson Mathías (yellow card) 44' | Report | Mendoza 36' | Stadium: Estadio Nemesio Díez; Attendance: 8,889; Referee: Fabricio Morales |

San Luis did not qualify to the Final Phase

=== Goalscorers ===
| Position | Nation | Name | Goals scored |
|---|---|---|---|
| 1. | (Argentina) | Mauro Matos | 3 |
| 2. | (Argentina) | Juan Cuevas | 2 |
| 2. | (Mexico) | Marco Iván Pérez | 2 |
| 2. | (Colombia) | Santiago Tréllez | 2 |
| 5. | (Mexico) | Yasser Corona | 1 |
| 5. | (Mexico) | Ricardo Jiménez | 1 |
| 5. | (Mexico) | Luis Ángel Mendoza | 1 |
| 5. | (Argentina) | Javier Muñoz | 1 |
| 5. | (Mexico) | Mario Ortiz | 1 |
| 5. | (Mexico) | Luis Alfonso Rodríguez | 1 |
| 5. | (Mexico) | Guillermo Rojas | 1 |
| 5. | (Mexico) | Moisés Velasco | 1 |
| 5. | (Mexico) | Alan Zamora | 1 |
| 5. | (Mexico) | David Salazar Zepeda | 1 |
| TOTAL | | | 19 |

=== Results ===
==== Results summary ====
| Overall | | | | | | | | Home | | | | | | Away | | | | | |
| Pld | W | D | L | GF | GA | GD | Pts | W | D | L | GF | GA | GD | W | D | L | GF | GA | GD |
|---|---|---|---|---|---|---|---|---|---|---|---|---|---|---|---|---|---|---|---|
| 17 | 4 | 4 | 9 | 19 | 25 | −6 | 16 | 2 | 2 | 4 | 10 | 12 | −2 | 2 | 2 | 5 | 9 | 13 | −4 |

Last updated: 5 May 2013.
Source: Clausura 2013 results

==== Results by round ====
| Round | 1 | 2 | 3 | 4 | 5 | 6 | 7 | 8 | 9 | 10 | 11 | 12 | 13 | 14 | 15 | 16 | 17 |
|---|---|---|---|---|---|---|---|---|---|---|---|---|---|---|---|---|---|
| Ground | H | A | H | A | A | H | A | H | A | H | A | H | A | H | A | H | A |
| Result | D | L | L | L | D | L | L | L | L | L | D | W | W | D | L | W | W |
| Position | 10 | 13 | 15 | 16 | 16 | 16 | 18 | 18 | 18 | 18 | 18 | 18 | 16 | 16 | 18 | 17 | 16 |

Updated to match(es) played on 5 May 2013. Source: Clausura 2013 results and mediotiempo.com
A = Away; H = Home; W = Win; D = Draw; L = Loss

== Clausura 2013 Copa MX ==
=== Group stage ===
Win Draw Loss

==== Clausura results ====
| January 16, 2013 1 | La Piedad | 1 – 4 | San Luis | La Piedad, Michoacán |
| 15:00 | Tafolla (yellow card) 57'; Cárdenas (yellow card) 63'; Rojas 71', (yellow card) 84' | Report | Cuevas 25'; Á. Ortiz 28', (yellow card) 46'; M. Ortiz (yellow card) 43'; Corona 66'; Pérez 73' | Stadium: Estadio Juan N. López; Attendance: 2,958; Referee: León Vicente Barajas |

| January 23, 2013 2 | San Luis | 2 – 1 | La Piedad | San Luis Potosí, San Luis Potosí |
| 19:00 | Rincón (yellow card) 60'; Matos 72'; Corona (yellow card) 73'; Cuevas 83' (pen.) | Report | Aparicio 32'; Gómez (yellow card) 43'; Ornrlas (yellow card) 80' (yellow-red card) 81'; Morales (red card) 86' | Stadium: Estadio Alfonso Lastras; Attendance: 3,297; Referee: César Arturo Ramos |

| February 12, 2013 3 | San Luis | 2 – 1 | Cruz Azul Hidalgo | San Luis Potosí, San Luis Potosí |
| 19:00 | Pérez (yellow card) 58'; Cuevas 68'; Velasco (red card) 86'; Corona 90+5' | Report | Marín (yellow card) 36'; Acevedo 44'; Quiñones (yellow card) 61'; García (yellow card) 74'; Langarica (red card) 77'; Galván (yellow card) 90+1'; Caso (yellow card) 90+4' | Stadium: Estadio Alfonso Lastras; Attendance: 2,779; Referee: Víctor Bisguerra Mendiola |

| February 20, 2013 4 | Cruz Azul Hidalgo | 4 – 0 | San Luis | Jasso, Hidalgo |
| 15:00 | Robles (yellow card) 10'; Quiñónes 21'; Ayala (yellow card) 36'; Hütt 53', 64', 79' | Report | Salazar (yellow card) 41'; Rodríguez (yellow card) 80' | Stadium: Estadio 10 de Diciembre; Attendance: 1,021; Referee: Baruch Absalon |

| February 26, 2013 5 | San Luis | 1 – 1 | Chiapas | San Luis Potosí, San Luis Potosí |
| 21:00 | Valdez (yellow card) 35'; García 53' | Report | Castellanos (yellow card) 44'; D. Andrade 81' | Stadium: Estadio Alfonso Lastras; Referee: Oscar Macías Romo |

| March 6, 2013 6 | Chiapas | 1 – 0 | San Luis | Tuxtla Gutiérrez, Chiapas |
| 21:00 | Córdoba 66'; Trujillo (yellow card) 71'; P. Hernández (yellow card) 84' | Report | Valdez (red card) 59' | Stadium: Estadio Victor Manuel Reyna; Attendance: 7,977; Referee: Antony Zanjuampa |

=== Goalscorers ===
| Position | Nation | Name | Goals scored |
|---|---|---|---|
| 1. | (Argentina) | Juan Cuevas | 3 |
| 2. | (Mexico) | Yasser Corona | 2 |
| 3. | (Argentina) | Mauro Matos | 1 |
| 3. | (Mexico) | Álvaro Ortiz | 1 |
| 3. | (Mexico) | Marco Iván Pérez | 1 |
| TOTAL | | | 8 |

=== Results ===
==== Results by round ====
| Round | 1 | 2 | 3 | 4 | 5 | 6 |
|---|---|---|---|---|---|---|
| Ground | A | H | H | A | H | A |
| Result | W | W | W | L | D | L |
| Position | 1 | 1 | 1 | 2 | 2 | 2 |

Updated to match(es) played on 14 March 2013. Source: Clausura results and mediotiempo.com
A = Away; H = Home; W = Win; D = Draw; L = Loss
