= Álvaro Ortiz =

Álvaro Ortiz may refer to:

- Álvaro Ortiz Vera (born 1977), Chilean journalist and politician
- Álvaro Ortiz (footballer) (born 1978), Mexican footballer
- Álvaro Ortiz (golfer) (born 1995), Mexican golfer
