= Marco Ramírez =

Marco Ramírez may refer to:

- Marco Ramírez (footballer), Mexican footballer
- Marco Méndez (born Marco Anibal Méndez Ramírez), Mexican actor
- Marco Ramirez (writer), American screenwriter

== See also ==
- Marcos Ramírez (disambiguation)
