= Marcos Ramírez =

Marcos Ramírez may refer to:

- Marcos Ramírez (footballer) (born 1983), Argentine football defender
- Marcos Ramirez (boxer) (born 1981), American boxer
- Marcos Ramírez (motorcyclist) (born 1997), Spanish motorcycle racer

== See also ==
- Marco Ramírez (disambiguation)
