= Victor Pozos =

Mexican footballer

Personal information
- Full name: Victor Manuel Pozos Segundo
- Date of birth: June 10, 1986 (age 40)
- Place of birth: Nayarit, Mexico
- Height: 1.85 m (6 ft 1 in)
- Position: Defender

Senior career*
Years	Team	Apps	(Gls)
2006–2007	Tecos B	3	(0)
2000–2011	Vaqueros Ixtlan	116	(9)
2011–2012	Puebla	6	(0)
- * Club domestic league appearances and goals

Victor Manuel Pozos Segundo (born 31 August 1983) is a Mexican former football player.

== Career ==
He began his career in 2006 playing with the Tecos juvenile squad. Soon after, he was transferred to a second division club Vaqueros Ixtlan where he played from 2007 to 2011, playing in 116 matches and scoring 9 times. In 2011, he was sold to the First Division club Puebla and spent 2011 in the under-20 squad. For the Clausura 2012 he was called up. He made his first division debut after Aldo Polo suffered an injury in mid-February 2012.
