= Andrés Cadavid =

Colombian footballer (born 1985)

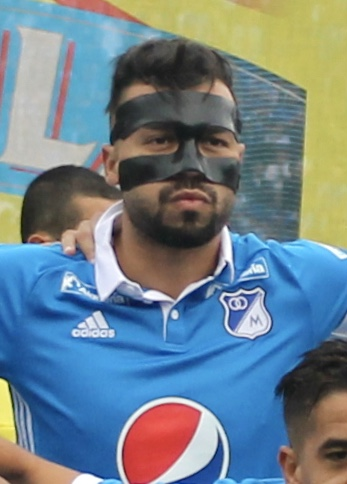

Personal information
- Full name: Andrés Felipe Cadavid Cardona
- Date of birth: 28 December 1985 (age 40)
- Place of birth: Medellín, Colombia
- Height: 1.88 m (6 ft 2 in)
- Position: Centre back

Team information
- Current team: Envigado Fútbol Club
- Number: 5

Senior career*
Years	Team	Apps	(Gls)
2006–2007	Atlético Bello	6	(0)
2008	Atlético Huila	10	(0)
2009	Patriotas Boyacá	40	(0)
2011	América Cali	19	(1)
2012	Deportivo Cali	18	(0)
2012–2013	San Luis	18	(0)
2013	→ Envigado (loan)	14	(0)
2013–2018	Millonarios	203	(13)
2019	Colón	7	(0)
2019–	Independiente Medellín	140	(18)
- * Club domestic league appearances and goals as of 16:53, 12 August 2023 (UTC)

Andrés Felipe Cadavid Cardona (Note: In this Spanish name, the first or paternal surname is Cadavid and the second or maternal family name is Cardona.) (born 28 December 1985), known as Andrés Cadavid, is a Colombian footballer who plays for Envigado Fútbol Club.

== Honours ==
Millonarios

- Categoría Primera A (1): 2017-II
- Superliga Colombiana (1): 2018

Independiente Medellín

- Copa Colombia (2): 2019, 2020

== Notes ==
Sporting positions
Preceded by Mayer Candelo	Millonarios FC captain 2017–2019	Succeeded by Jhon Duque
