= David Salazar (footballer, born 1991) =

Mexican footballer (born 1991)

Personal information
- Full name: David Alejandro Salazar Zepeda
- Date of birth: 5 August 1991 (age 35)
- Place of birth: Monterrey, Nuevo León, México
- Height: 1.67 m (5 ft 6 in)
- Position: Forward

Youth career
- 2008–2009: Panteras Negras GNL
- 2009–2011: Universidad de Monterrey
- 2011–2013: San Luis

Senior career*
Years	Team	Apps	(Gls)
2013–2015	Chiapas	8	(0)
2014	→ BUAP (loan)	6	(0)
2015	→ UAEM (loan)	10	(2)
2016	América	0	(0)
2016–2017	Real Cuautitlán	18	(1)
2018–2020	Atlante	20	(2)
2020	Querétaro	1	(0)
- * Club domestic league appearances and goals as of 27 July 2020

David Alejandro Salazar Zepeda (born August 5, 1991) is a Mexican professional footballer who plays for Atlante on loan from América.
