= Jherson Córdoba =

Colombian footballer (born 1988)

Personal information
- Full name: Jherson Enrique Córdoba Ospina
- Date of birth: 9 February 1988 (age 38)
- Place of birth: Bogotá, Colombia
- Height: 1.76 m (5 ft 9 in)
- Position: Defensive midfielder

Youth career
- Santa Fe

Senior career*
Years	Team	Apps	(Gls)
2006–2010	La Equidad	94	(4)
2011	Envigado FC	8	(0)
2011–2012	Atlético de Rafaela	6	(0)
2012	Atlético Nacional	30	(0)
2012–2013	San Luis	8	(0)
2013	Junior	7	(1)
2014–2015	Independiente Medellin	50	(1)
2015–2016	Alianza Petrolera	22	(2)
2016–2017	Sport Boys	24	(0)
2018	Leones	12	(0)

International career
2009	Colombia	1	(0)
- * Club domestic league appearances and goals as of 18 November 2020

Jherson Enrique Córdoba Ospina (born 9 February 1988) is a Colombian former professional footballer who plays as a defensive midfielder. He last played for Leones in 2018.

== Career ==
=== Club ===
Córdoba began his career with La Equidad in 2006 and played for them until 2010, making 94 league appearances and scoring 4 goals. He signed on loan for Envigado in March 2011. In July 2011, Córdoba moved to Argentina to play for Atlético de Rafaela. In December 2011, he signed with Atlético Nacional on a season-long loan deal. On 21 February 2012, Cordoba scored two goals in a Copa Libertadores match against Peñarol of Uruguay that finished in a 0–4 away victory.

In late December 2012, Cordoba signed for Mexican club San Luis and played for them during six months. In July 2013, he traveled back to Colombia and signed for Junior. In January 2014, he transferred to Independiente Medellín. In June 2016, he joined Sport Boys Warnes of Bolivia on a one-year-contract. On 28 April 2017, he scored a goal in a 1–3 loss against Godoy Cruz in the 2017 Copa Libertadores, despite being sent off just two minutes later.

Córdoba and the club agreed to terminate his contract in May 2017. He transferred to Leones for the 2018 season.

=== International ===
Cordóba was called up to the Colombia national football team for the 2010 World Cup qualifying matches against Chile and Paraguay on 10 and 14 October 2009 respectively. He played in the match against Paraguay, which was his first and only match for Colombia.
