= Everton (footballer, born 1986) =

Brazilian footballer

Personal information
- Full name: Everton Guimarães Ferreira
- Date of birth: 14 November 1986 (age 39)
- Place of birth: Brazil
- Height: 1.80 m (5 ft 11 in)
- Position: Midfielder

Team information
- Current team: Tricolor de Vila Formosa

Youth career
- Guarani (SP)

Senior career*
Years	Team	Apps	(Gls)
2006	Guarani (SP)	0	(0)
2008	River Zona Sul (futsal)		
2008	ECUS	0	(0)
2008	Tourizense		
2008	Gloria Buzău	4	(0)
2009	Grêmio Jaciara	0	(0)
2009	Rio Verde (MS)	0	(0)
2009	Big Preço FS (7 a-side)		
2010	Tricolor de Vila Formosa	0	(0)
2010	Rio Verde (MS)	0	(0)
2011	Tricolor de Vila Formosa	0	(0)
- * Club domestic league appearances and goals

Everton Guimarães Ferreira (born 14 November 1986) is a Brazilian footballer who plays for Tricolor de Vila Formosa (as of January 2011).

== Biography ==
Everton started his professional career at Guarani (SP). In the 2006 Campeonato Brasileiro Série B, he appeared once as unused bench. He then played for the futsal side River Zona Sul Futsal and in May 2008 signed a contract with Esporte Clube União Suzano for the 2008 Campeonato Paulista Segunda Divisão. In August 2008, he left for the Portuguese Second Division side Tourizense and then the Romanian Liga I club Gloria Buzău. He was fired in November 2008, along with Tiago.

He then played for Grêmio Jaciara and, in March 2009, was signed by Rio Verde (MS) until the end of 2009 Campeonato Sul-Matogrossense. He then played for Big Preço FS, a 7-a-side football team in São Caetano do Sul, São Paulo state. He also played for Tricolor de Vila Formosa, an amateur side in Vila Formosa, São Paulo city. before being signed again by Rio Verde (MS) in March 2010. His contract was extended in May, after he had played 11 games in 2010 Campeonato Sul-Matogrossense. He was released again in January 2011.
