= Guillermo Rojas =

Mexican footballer (born 1983)

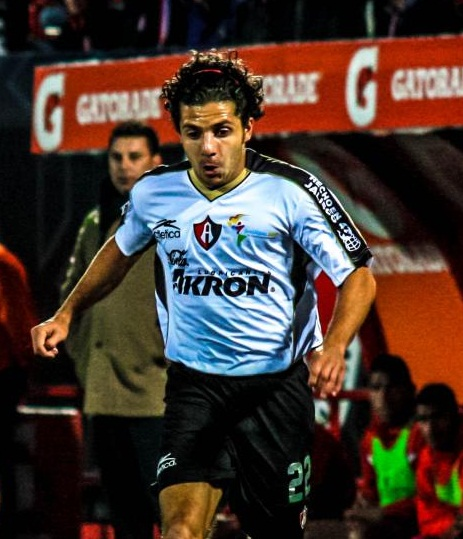
- Rojas playing for Atlas in 2012

Personal information
- Full name: Guillermo Rojas Rumilla
- Date of birth: 29 March 1983 (age 43)
- Place of birth: San Luis, San Luis Potosí, Mexico
- Height: 1.66 m (5 ft 5 in)
- Position: Midfielder

Senior career*
Years	Team	Apps	(Gls)
2003–2008	Puebla	23	(0)
2005–2007	→ Monterrey (loan)	9	(0)
2008–2010	Veracruz	37	(2)
2009–2010	→ Atlante (loan)	25	(0)
2011–2013	Chiapas	11	(0)
2011–2012	→ Atlas (loan)	20	(0)
2012–2013	→ San Luis (loan)	11	(1)
2013–2015	Querétaro	0	(0)
2013	→ Atlante (loan)	3	(0)
2014	→ Necaxa (loan)	8	(0)
2014–2015	→ Sinaloa (loan)	16	(1)
2015–2016	Sinaloa	9	(0)

Managerial career
- 2022–2023: Tlaxcala (assistant)
- * Club domestic league appearances and goals

Guillermo Rojas Rumilla (born 29 March 1983) is a Mexican football coach and a former winger. Rojas made his professional debut with Puebla in 2003. He was considered to be one of the fastest footballers in the world.

He was selected by José Guadalupe Cruz as one of the squad members for 2009 FIFA Club World Cup. He played the first match against Auckland City FC, game which Atlante won 3–0. Days later, Atlante would have to face FC Barcelona. Rojas' scored his first goal in official competitions, but Atlante lost the match 1–3.

Rojas' incredible speed was reportedly first noticed by a school teacher when Rojas had been chasing after a boy who tried to steal his football. The teacher then placed Rojas on the school athletics, football and baseball teams. The school which Rojas attended claim that he ran a 100m sprint in a time of 10.76 at the age of 12. If true, this would still be a Mexican record for that particular age group to this day.

In 2013, Rojas acquired the nickname "The Freak" because of his blazing speed. In EA's FIFA 13, Rojas was the fastest player in the game along with Theo Walcott and Jonathan Biabiany.

== Honours ==
- CONCACAF Champions' Cup / CONCACAF Champions League

Winners (1):, 2008-09
