= Cesáreo Victorino =

Mexican footballer (born 1979)

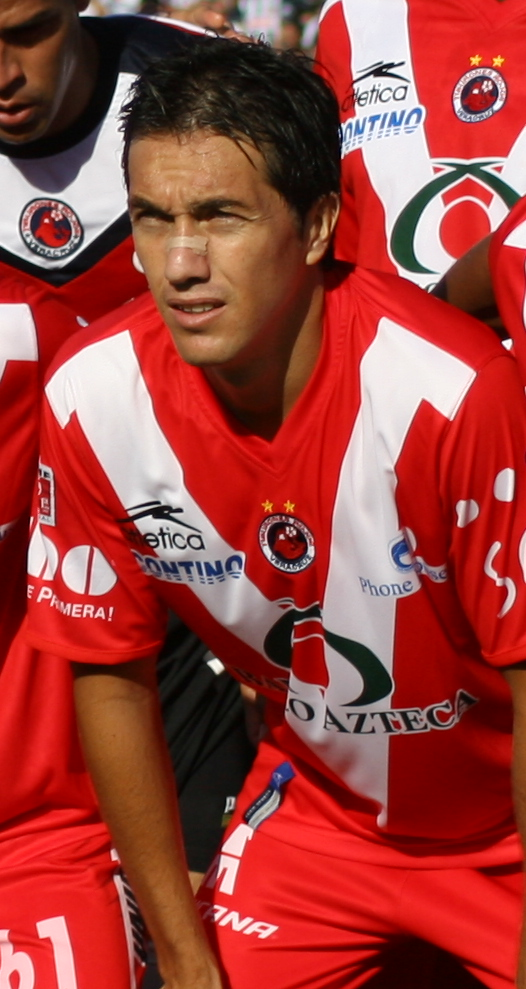
- Victorino playing for Veracruz

Personal information
- Full name: Cesáreo Victorino Mungaray
- Date of birth: March 19, 1979 (age 47)
- Place of birth: Mexico City, Mexico
- Height: 1.78 m (5 ft 10 in)
- Position: Attacking midfielder

Senior career*
| Years | Team | Apps | (Gls) |
| 1996–2005 | Pachuca | 137 | (14) |
| 2001–2004 | Cruz Azul | 67 | (5) |
| 2005 | SK Slavia Prague | 4 | (0) |
| 2006 | Pumas UNAM | 8 | (1) |
| 2007–2008 | Veracruz | 45 | (1) |
| 2008 | Puebla | 15 | (0) |
| 2009–2012 | Lobos BUAP | 32 | (6) |
| 2011 | → Puebla (loan) | 1 | (0) |

International career
| 1999 | Mexico U20 | 4 | (0) |
| 1998–2001 | Mexico | 13 | (0) |
Medal record
Representing Mexico
| Runner-up | Copa America | 2001 |
- * Club domestic league appearances and goals

Cesáreo Victorino Mungaray (born 19 March 1979) is a Mexican former professional footballer who played as an attacking midfielder. He is one of the Mexican footballers to have played in Europe and was a part of the Mexico national team between 1998 and 2001. He also played for Mexico in the 1999 FIFA World Youth Championship held in Nigeria.

== Club career ==
He made his debut with Pachuca in 1997, and he scored the decisive goal in the series against Tigrillos in 1998 to secure promotion to the first division. His rise with Pachuca was rapid. An attacking midfielder with an eye for surging runs in support of striker Pablo Hernán Gómez, Victorino helped the Tuzos to the Invierno 1999 championship in the club's third season after promotion. His most statistically productive campaign came in the Verano 2001 tournament, when he scored eight goals as Pachuca reached the final. He moved to Cruz Azul the following season, but was unable to recapture the promise of his early years at Pachuca. He later represented several clubs both inside and outside Mexico, including UNAM and Puebla.

== International career ==
Victorino also earned 13 caps for Mexico. He made his international debut against El Salvador on November 17, 1998, when he was still only 19. He appeared in all three matches of the 2001 FIFA Confederations Cup as well as Mexico's 2001 home qualifying defeat against Costa Rica, a disastrous spell for Mexico that brought an end to Enrique Meza's tenure as coach. Although former Pachuca coach Javier Aguirre took the helm of the national team and included him for three matches at the 2001 Copa America, including the final against Colombia, Victorino earned his last cap on October 31, 2001, in a 4-1 exhibition victory over El Salvador.

== Honours ==
Mexico

- Copa América runner-up: 2001
