= Jaime Durán =

Mexican footballer (born 1981)

Personal information
- Full name: Jaime Durán Gómez
- Date of birth: 2 December 1981 (age 44)
- Place of birth: Jalisco, Mexico
- Height: 1.76 m (5 ft 9 in)
- Position: Defender

Team information
- Current team: FC Rànger's (Manager)

Senior career*
Years	Team	Apps	(Gls)
1999–2006	Atlas	139	(2)
2007	Puebla	7	(1)
2007	→ León (loan)	16	(1)
2008–2010	Morelia	52	(0)
2008	→ Mérida	1	(0)
2009	→ Skoda Xanthi (loan)	0	(0)
2009	→ Atlas	6	(0)
2010–2011	Chiapas	12	(0)
2011–2014	Puebla	57	(0)

Managerial career
- 2018: Atlas (Assistant)
- 2018–2020: CAFESSA Jalisco
- 2021: Tampico Madero (Assistant)
- 2021–2022: Mazorqueros
- 2022–2023: Atlético La Paz
- 2024–2025: Atlas U23
- 2025–: FC Rànger's
- * Club domestic league appearances and goals as of 5 May 2013

Jaime Durán Gómez (born 2 December 1981) is a Mexican former professional footballer who played as a defender.

== Club career ==
Durán began his career in the youth ranks of Futbol Club Atlas and made his First Division debut on August 14, 1999, in a 2–3 loss to Tigres. He became a regular for Atlas appearing in a total of 139 matches in his seven years at the club, which includes 14 liguilla matches. Durán than moved on to Puebla before being loaned out to León and Monarcas Morelia in subsequent years. After having a fine season with Monarcas Morelia in which he appeared in 23 matches, he decided to explore opportunities in Europe. In January, 2009 he joined Skoda Xanthi in the Super League Greece.

== International career ==
Jaime Durán has represented Mexico at various youth levels. He was also a member of the Mexican U23 team.

== Honours ==
Mexico U23

- CONCACAF Olympic Qualifying Championship: 2004

== Statistics ==
League	Appearances	Goals
Primera División de México	232	3
Liguilla	20	0
Super League Greece	0	0
