= Marco Ramírez (footballer) =

Mexican footballer (born 1990)

Personal information
- Full name: Marco Arturo Ramírez
- Date of birth: 25 October 1990 (age 36)
- Place of birth: Puebla, Mexico
- Height: 1.68 m (5 ft 6 in)
- Position: Winger

Youth career
- 2007–2008: Lobos BUAP
- 2008–2011: Puebla

Senior career*
| Years | Team | Apps | (Gls) |
| 2011–2012 | Puebla | 0 | (0) |
| 2013–2014 | Águilas Reales de Zacatecas | | |
- * Club domestic league appearances and goals

Marco Arturo Ramírez (born 25 October 1990), known as Marco, is a Mexican former footballer who played mainly as a left winger.

He came up through Lobos BUAP Youth system. Later was transferred to Puebla FC Reserves. He was called to take part in the 2011 Apertura Tournament.
