= Antonio López (footballer, born May 1989) =

Mexican footballer (born 1989)

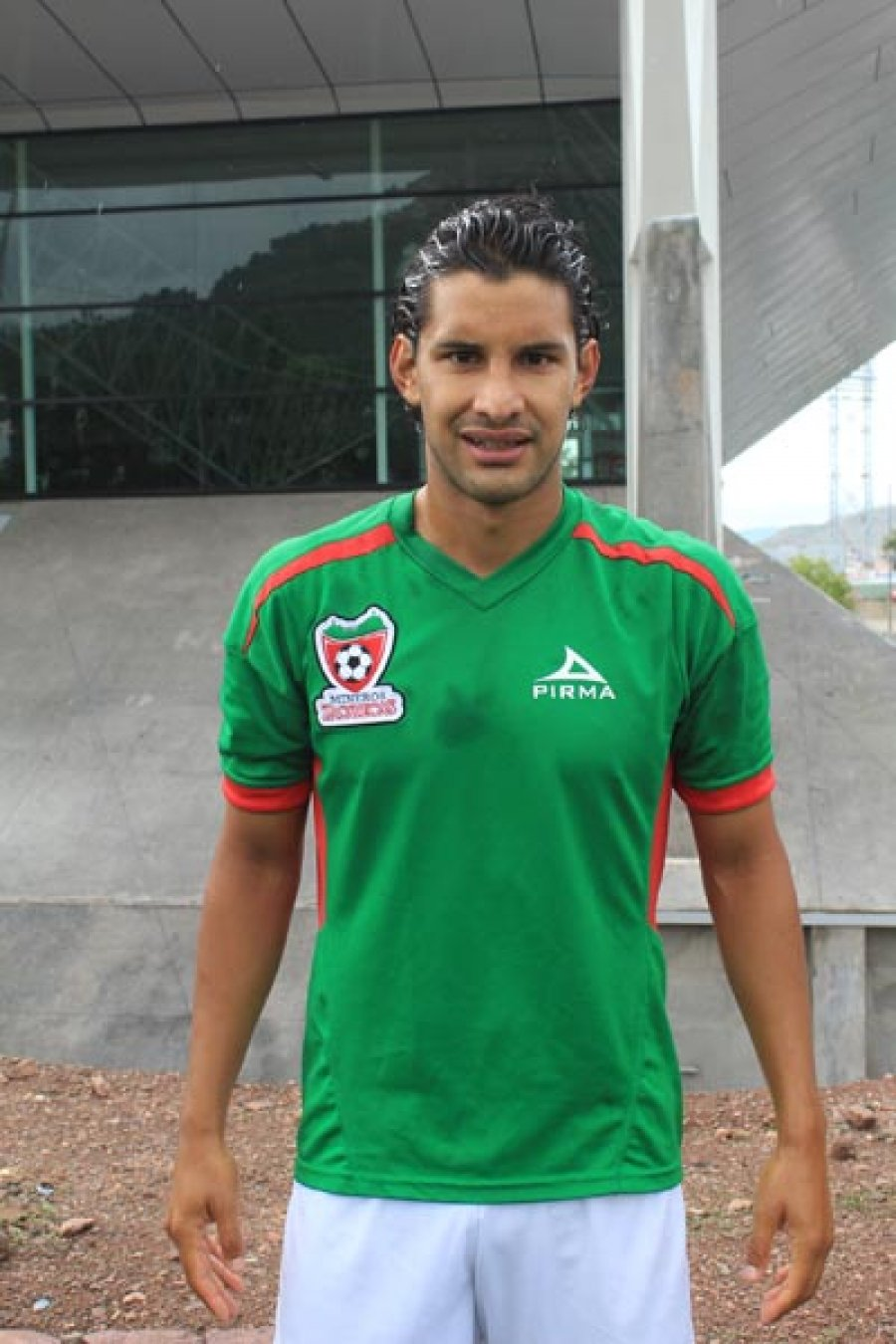

Personal information
- Full name: Antonio López Ojeda
- Date of birth: 18 May 1989 (age 37)
- Place of birth: La Paz, Baja California Sur, Mexico
- Height: 1.85 m (6 ft 1 in)
- Position: Forward

Team information
- Current team: Atlético La Paz (assistant)

Youth career
- América

Senior career*
Years	Team	Apps	(Gls)
2010–2014	América	40	(6)
2011	→ Puebla (loan)	3	(0)
2014–2015	→ Zacatecas (loan)	25	(3)
2015	→ Atlante (loan)	16	(2)
2016–2019	Potros UAEM	83	(21)
2019	UAT	11	(1)
2020–2021	Tampico Madero	33	(4)
2021–2022	Sololá	22	(6)
2022	Antigua	21	(2)
2023	Marquense		

International career
2011	Mexico U22	7	(0)
2011	Mexico U23	2	(0)

Managerial career
- 2024–: Atlético La Paz (assistant)
- 2025: Atlético La Paz (interim)
- * Club domestic league appearances and goals

Antonio López Ojeda (born 18 May 1989) is a Mexican professional football coach and a former forward. He is the interim manager of Atlético La Paz.

== Honours ==
América

- Liga MX: Clausura 2013

Tampico Madero

- Liga de Expansión MX: Guardianes 2020
