= Guillermo Cerda =

Mexican footballer (born 1984)

Personal information
- Full name: Guillermo Cerda Martínez
- Date of birth: 13 February 1984 (age 42)
- Place of birth: Mexico City, Mexico
- Position: Defender

Senior career*
Years	Team	Apps	(Gls)
2007–2010	América	27	(0)
2011	→ Puebla (loan)	2	(0)
2011–2012	→ San Luis (loan)	10	(0)
- * Club domestic league appearances and goals as of 8 July 2012

Guillermo Cerda Martínez (born 13 February 1984) is a Mexican former footballer who played as a defender.
