= Diego Campos (Mexican footballer) =

Mexican footballer (born 1988)

Personal information
- Full name: Diego Campos Peiro
- Date of birth: 19 March 1988 (age 38)
- Place of birth: Guadalajara, Mexico
- Height: 1.72 m (5 ft 8 in)
- Position: Right midfielder

Team information
- Current team: Atlético San Luis (assistant)

Youth career
- 2006–2008: Académicos

Senior career*
Years	Team	Apps	(Gls)
2008–2011	Atlas	12	(0)
2011–2012	Puebla	4	(0)
2012–2016	Leones Negros	51	(5)
2013–2014	→ Estudiantes Tecos (loan)	34	(4)
2015–2016	→ Atlético San Luis (loan)	30	(1)
2017	Lobos BUAP	8	(0)
2018	Atlante	7	(0)
Total		146	(10)

Managerial career
- 2019–2022: Puebla Reserves and Academy
- 2022–2024: Puebla (assistant)
- 2025–2026: Atlético Ottawa (assistant)
- 2026–: Atlético San Luis (assistant)
- * Club domestic league appearances and goals

Diego Campos Peiro (born 19 March 1988) is a Mexican football coach and former professional footballer who serves as assistant coach of Canadian club Atlético Ottawa.

== Career ==
Campos came up through Club Atlas's lower division under-17 and under-20 squads. He played for Académicos de Guadalajara in the Primera A in 2009. On Sunday June 8, 2011 he was transferred to Puebla F.C. after a few years in Club Atlas's first squad where he only played in eleven games.

On 15 January 2025, Campos was announced as assistant coach of Canadian Premier League club Atlético Ottawa.
