= Diego Cervantes =

Mexican footballer (born 1984)

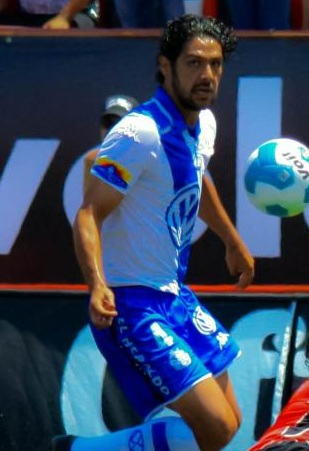
- Cervantes playing for Puebla

Personal information
- Full name: Diego Alberto Cervantes Chávez
- Date of birth: 30 August 1984 (age 42)
- Place of birth: Mexico City, Mexico
- Height: 1.92 m (6 ft 4 in)
- Position: Centre back

Team information
- Current team: América U-17 (Assistant)

Senior career*
Years	Team	Apps	(Gls)
2005–2011	América	42	(0)
2008–2009	→ San Luis (Loan)	10	(3)
2009	→ Necaxa (Loan)	14	(3)
2009	→ Atlante (Loan)	6	(0)
2010	→ Monterrey (Loan)	3	(0)
2011–2012	Puebla	17	(0)
2013	Querétaro	1	(0)
2013	→ Delfines (Loan)	1	(0)
2014	Lobos BUAP	4	(0)
2014–2016	Atlético San Luis	44	(1)

Managerial career
- 2017–2020: Querétaro Reserves and Academy
- 2021–: América Reserves and Academy
- * Club domestic league appearances and goals as of 4 February 2014

Diego Alberto Cervantes Chávez (born 30 August 1984) is a Mexican former football player. He is currently an assistant coach for Querétaro Fútbol Club's U-20 team.

== Career ==
Before earning a spot on Club América's senior team, Cervantes worked his way up the inferior divisions, eventually earning a spot in San Luis F.C., America's minor league affiliate at the time. After helping San Luis earn a promotion to the first division after the Clausura 2005 season, Cervantes was transferred to Club América prior to the Apertura 2005 season.

His debut in the professional Mexican league came October 30, 2005 - in a game against one of America's most bitter rivals - UNAM Pumas. Cervantes started the game along with many other reserves, due to the fatigue endured by the starters after playing that very same week against Velez Sarsfield in the Copa Sudamericana. After playing the full 90 minutes and holding his own against UNAM's talented strikers, Cervantes was praised by the media and fans alike after helping the team to a 2–1 win.

He would play once more during the regular season, coming on to the pitch as a substitute against Atlante, where his brother Horacio Cervantes plays, also as a defender. Diego once again helped the club to victory, beating Atlante 4–3.

In the Apertura 2005 playoffs, to which America qualified in the first position with the best record in the league, Diego was called to play against UANL Tigres in the second leg of the quarterfinals. Reprising his role as a substitute, Diego was part of a team that lost 4–1 at home and was eliminated in an embarrassing fashion. After the game, the press criticized the rookie for his role in allowing a crucial goal, as well as Club América's coach Mario Carrillo, for inserting an inexperienced player in the biggest game of the season.

Following the elimination, Carrillo was fired and Cervantes was relegated to the bench by subsequent managers, Víctor Manuel Aguado and Manuel Lapuente.

The Américanista defence suffered through a stagnant period forcing them to reconsider their roster; Diego was a casualty and returned to San Luis in 2008 for that year's Apertura.

His next stop was Necaxa for the 2009 Clausura season. A move to reinforce that team to fight against relegation – eventually they lost the battle, dragging them to Liga de Ascenso. An interesting anomaly happened: Diego saw some action as a centre forward. He scored 3 goals against Indios (2) in round 3 and Tigres (1) in round 14.

Not in the plans of boss Jesús Ramírez made Cervantes wear his fourth jersey in a short time. For the 2009 Apertura season he defended his brother's old team, Atlante.
