= Giovanni León =

Mexican footballer (born 1992)

Personal information
- Full name: Francisco Giovanni León Rodríguez
- Date of birth: 12 March 1992 (age 34)
- Place of birth: Ensenada, Baja California, Mexico
- Height: 1.80 m (5 ft 11 in)
- Position: Centre-back

Youth career
- 2007–2011: Atlas

Senior career*
Years	Team	Apps	(Gls)
2011–2012	→ Puebla (loan)	0	(0)
2012–2016	Atlas	48	(0)
2015	→ U. de G. (loan)	4	(0)
2016	→ Coras (loan)	4	(0)
2017	→ Alebrijes de Oaxaca (loan)	3	(0)
2017–2018	Murciélagos	25	(1)
2018–2019	Atlético San Luis	5	(0)
2019–2020	Alebrijes de Oaxaca	18	(0)
2020	Atlético Veracruz	0	(0)

International career
2009	Mexico U17	0	(0)
- * Club domestic league appearances and goals as of 21 September 2019

Francisco Giovanni León Rodríguez (born 12 March 1992) is a former Mexican professional footballer who last played as a centre-back.

== Career ==
In 2007, at age 16, he was signed by Primera División (First Division) club Atlas and soon joined their youth system. In 2009, he was called up to the Mexico U-17. After 4 years in Atlas youth system he was sent on loan to First Division Club Puebla on 9 June 2011.

He played with Atlético Veracruz of the Liga de Balompié Mexicano during the league's inaugural season, leading them to a runners-up finish after losing to Chapulineros de Oaxaca in the finals.

== Career statistics ==
As of 25 September 2014

Club	Season	League			FA Cup		Other^{[A]}		Total	
Club	Season	Division	Apps	Goals	Apps	Goals	Apps	Goals	Apps	Goals
Puebla	2011–12	Primera División	0	0	0	0	0	0	0	0
Total			0	0	0	0	0	0	0	0
Atlas	2012–13	Liga MX	0	0	5	0	0	0	5	0
Atlas	2013–14	Liga MX	26	0	9	0	0	0	35	0
Atlas	2014–15	Liga MX	0	0	6	0	0	0	6	0
Total			26	0	20	0	0	0	46	0
Career totals			26	0	20	0	0	0	46	0
