= Mario Rodríguez (footballer, born 1978) =

Mexican footballer

Personal information
- Full name: Mario Rodríguez Cervantes
- Date of birth: 18 January 1978 (age 48)
- Place of birth: Torreón, Coahuila, Mexico
- Height: 1.84 m (6 ft 0 in)
- Position: Goalkeeper

Team information
- Current team: Santos Laguna U-20 (Goalkeeper coach)

Senior career*
Years	Team	Apps	(Gls)
2000–2006	Tecos	88	(0)
2006–2008	Atlas	41	(0)
2008–2012	Estudiantes	24	(0)
2011–2012	→ Puebla (loan)	5	(0)
2013	La Piedad	8	(0)
2013	Lobos BUAP	4	(0)
2014	Zacatepec	14	(0)
2014–2015	Veracruz	0	(0)

Managerial career
- 2016–2017: Real Cuautitlán (Assistant)
- 2017–2018: Veracruz Premier (Assistant)
- 2018: Veracruz (Assistant)
- 2020–2022: Tampico Madero (Goalkeeper coach)
- 2023–: Santos Laguna Reserves and Academy
- * Club domestic league appearances and goals as of 26 April 2013

Mario Rodríguez Cervantes (born 18 January 1978) is a Mexican former footballer. As of 2013, he played for Lobos BUAP as a goalkeeper. During a game against Chivas Guadalajara and C.F. Pachuca he passed the ball to the opposite team and they ended up making goals from Gonzalo Pineda and from Christian Gimenez. Since these incidents he has been working hard to recover his form to be in the starting line-up.

After Jose de Jesus Corona was sold to Cruz Azul, Mario became the starting goalkeeper for Estudiantes Tecos for the start of Apertura 2009.

== InterLiga 2008 ==
Mario Rodríguez has gotten three Clean Sheets in all three games he has played, and he was back in form to be the First-Choice Goalkeeper of Club Atlas. With the purchase of Uruguay goalkeeper Jorge Bava, he has been relegated to the bench.
