= Alexandro Álvarez =

Mexican footballer (born 1977)

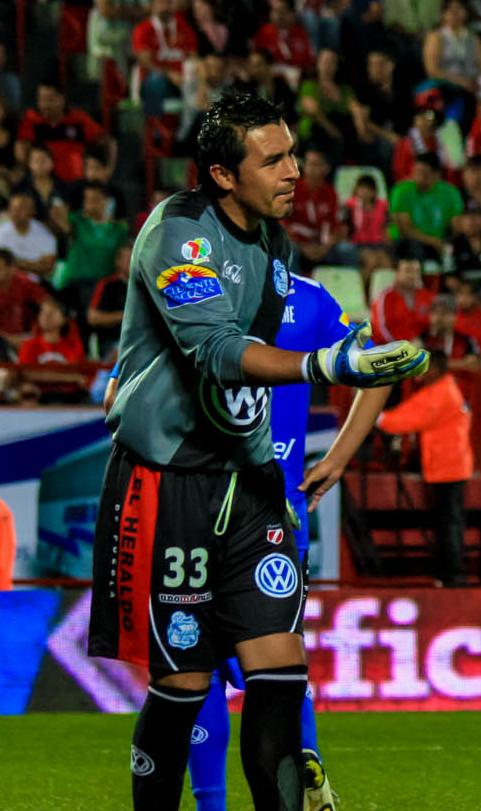

Personal information
- Full name: Alexandro Álvarez Olivares
- Date of birth: 26 January 1977 (age 49)
- Place of birth: Mexico City, Mexico
- Height: 1.82 m (6 ft 0 in)
- Position: Goalkeeper

Team information
- Current team: Club América (women) (Goalkeeping coach)

Senior career*
Years	Team	Apps	(Gls)
1999–2002	Necaxa	61	(0)
2002	Celaya	2	(0)
2003	Cuernavaca	11	(0)
2003–2004	Santos Laguna	10	(0)
2004–2005	Veracruz	0	(0)
2006–2007	Necaxa	15	(0)
2008–2009	Coronel Bolognesi	6	(0)
2009–2013	Puebla	89	(0)
2013	Cruz Azul Hidalgo	10	(0)
2014	Morelia	0	(0)
2015	Atlético San Luis	6	(0)

Managerial career
- 2020–2021: Mexico U17 (Goalkeeping coach)
- 2021–2024: Mexico U20 (Goalkeeping coach)
- 2024: Atlante (Goalkeeping coach)
- 2025–2026: Club América (women) (Goalkeeping coach)
- * Club domestic league appearances and goals

Alexandro Álvarez Olivares (born 26 January 1977) is a Mexican professional football coach and a former player. He is currently the goalkeeping coach of Liga MX Femenil side Club América.

== Honours ==
Necaxa

- FIFA Club World Cup: Third Place - 2000

Morelia

- Supercopa MX (1): 2014
