= Obed Rincón =

Mexican footballer (born 1985)

Personal information
- Full name: Obed Isaí Rincón López
- Date of birth: 4 February 1985 (age 41)
- Place of birth: Monterrey, Mexico
- Height: 1.80 m (5 ft 11 in)
- Position: Left back

Senior career*
| Years | Team | Apps | (Gls) |
| 2004–05 | Ciudad Juárez | 8 | (0) |
| 2005–2006 | Monterrey B | 5 | (0) |
| 2006–2007 | Correcaminos | 5 | (0) |
| 2007–2008 | Salamanca | 24 | (0) |
| 2008–2011 | Necaxa | 25 | (0) |
| 2011–2012 | → Puebla (loan) | 9 | (0) |
| 2012–2013 | → La Piedad (loan) | 23 | (2) |
| 2013 | → San Luis (loan) | | |
- * Club domestic league appearances and goals

Obed Isaí Rincón López (Note: In this Spanish name, the first or paternal surname is Rincón and the second or maternal family name is López.) (born 4 February 1985) is a Mexican former professional footballer who last played as a left-back for C.F. La Piedad in the Ascenso MX. He began his professional career with Club Necaxa in 2008.
