= Alan Zamora =

Mexican footballer (born 1985)

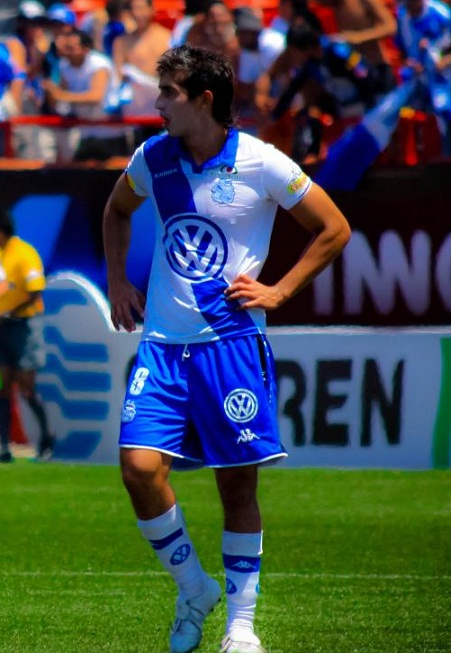
- Zamora playing for Puebla

Personal information
- Full name: Alan Miguel Zamora González
- Date of birth: April 8, 1985 (age 41)
- Place of birth: Mexico City, Mexico
- Height: 1.78 m (5 ft 10 in)
- Position: Defensive midfielder

Team information
- Current team: Querétaro U-21 (Manager)

Youth career
- América

Senior career*
Years	Team	Apps	(Gls)
2007–2009	Atlante	66	(1)
2009–2012	Jaguares	67	(0)
2011–2012	→ Puebla (loan)	33	(2)
2013	San Luis	13	(1)
2013	Querétaro	0	(0)
2014	→ Puebla (loan)	12	(0)
2014–2015	→ Chiapas (loan)	12	(0)
2015–2016	Veracruz	24	(0)
2017–2018	Atlante	11	(0)

International career
2008	Mexico U23	4	(0)

Managerial career
- 2020: Querétaro Reserves and Academy
- 2021–2023: Mineros Querétaro
- 2023–: Querétaro Reserves and Academy
- * Club domestic league appearances and goals as of 15 December 2017

Alan Miguel Zamora González (born 8 April 1985) is a Mexican former professional footballer. He played as a midfielder for Veracruz on loan from Querétaro of the Liga MX. He made his debut March 3, 2007, against Necaxa, which resulted in a 3–0 victory for Atlante.

== Honours ==
Atlante

- Primera División: Apertura 2007
