= Aldo Polo =

Mexican footballer (born 1983)

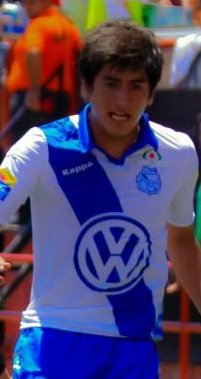
- Polo playing for Puebla

Personal information
- Full name: Aldo Francisco Polo Ramirez
- Date of birth: 31 August 1983 (age 43)
- Place of birth: Mexico City, Mexico
- Height: 1.76 m (5 ft 9 in)
- Position: Defender

Senior career*
Years	Team	Apps	(Gls)
2002–2004	Altamira	32	(0)
2004–2005	Correcaminos UAT	21	(0)
2005–2006	Dorados	101	(11)
2006–2011	León	54	(3)
2011–2014	Puebla	36	(1)
2013	→ Correcaminos UAT (loan)	15	(1)
2013	→ Tijuana (loan)	7	(1)
2014	→ Dorados (loan)	13	(0)
2015–2020	Venados	130	(15)
2016–2017	→ Sonora (loan)	38	(6)
- * Club domestic league appearances and goals

Aldo Francisco Polo Ramirez (born 31 August 1983) is a Mexican former footballer.

== Career ==
He began his career in 2002 playing in the third division with club Tecamachalgo. Soon after, he transferred to second division club Estudiantes de Santender, where he spent a year before transferring to Correcaminos UAT, who played in the Liga de Ascenso. Soon after, he transferred to Dorados de Sinaloa in 2005 and in 2006 with Club Leon, where he spent 5 years. In 2011, he was finally signed by a first division club Puebla in the Liga de Ascenso Draft.
