= Álvaro Ortiz (footballer) =

Mexican footballer (born 1978)

Personal information
- Full name: Álvaro Ortiz Arellano
- Date of birth: 19 February 1978 (age 48)
- Place of birth: Mexico City, Mexico
- Height: 1.78 m (5 ft 10 in)
- Position: Defender

Senior career*
| Years | Team | Apps | (Gls) |
| 1998–1999 | León | 17 | (1) |
| 1999–2000 | Guadalajara | 7 | (1) |
| 2000–2001 | Necaxa | 52 | (9) |
| 2002 | América | 30 | (1) |
| 2003 | Necaxa | 14 | (0) |
| 2003–2005 | América | 67 | (3) |
| 2005–2007 | San Luis F.C. | 60 | (0) |
| 2007–2008 | Toluca | 6 | (0) |
| 2008–2012 | Puebla | 79 | (2) |
| 2012 | Lobos BUAP | 2 | (0) |
| 2013 | San Luis F.C. | 8 | (1) |
| 2013–2014 | Chiapas F.C. | 6 | (0) |
| Total | | 348 | (18) |

International career
| 2000 | Mexico | 3 | (0) |
- * Club domestic league appearances and goals

Álvaro Ortiz Arellano (born 19 February 1978 in Mexico City) is a Mexican former footballer who played as a defender. He has made three appearances for the Mexico national football team.

== Career ==
Ortiz made his debut in the Primera División de México with Leon in the Invierno 1998, against Chivas. Ortiz regularly played with Leon the next season, making 15 appearances and scoring 1 goal. Ortiz moved to Chivas for the Invierno 1999 tournament where he only made 4 appearances. The following season he saw little success appearing a total of 3 times for Chivas.

Ortiz moved to Necaxa for the Invierno 2000, and in three season with Necaxa he made 43 appearances and scored 8 goals, before a transfer to Club América. Ortiz made 15 Primera appearances for America before a return to Necaxa for the Clausura 2003, but it was a brief spell and was followed with a return to play for America, making 52 appearances.

Ortiz moved to San Luis F.C. for the Apertura 2005 season and made 63 appearances in the Primera before a transfer to Toluca for the Apertura 2007. However, after only six games he moved to Puebla FC where he captained the side, and as at the end of the Apertura 2011, he had played 73 Primera games for Puebla.
